= List of Venezuelan submissions for the Academy Award for Best International Feature Film =

Best International Feature Film submissions from Venezuela

Highlights
- Debut: 1977
- Submissions: 36
- Nominations: none
- Oscar winners: none

Venezuela has submitted films for the Academy Award for Best International Feature Film (Note: The category was previously named the Academy Award for Best Foreign Language Film, but this was changed to the Academy Award for Best International Feature Film in April 2019, after the Academy deemed the word "Foreign" to be outdated.) since 1977. The award is handed out annually by the United States Academy of Motion Picture Arts and Sciences to a feature-length motion picture produced outside the United States that contains primarily non-English dialogue. Venezuelan submissions are selected annually by the Centro Nacional Autónomo de Cinematografía.

As of 2026, Venezuela has submitted thirty-six films, but none of them have been nominated.

== Submissions ==
The Academy of Motion Picture Arts and Sciences has invited the film industries of various countries to submit their best film for the Academy Award for Best International Feature Film since 1956. The International Feature Film Committee oversees the process and reviews all the submitted films. Following this, they vote via secret ballot to determine the five nominees for the award.

1888: The Extraordinary Voyage of the Santa Isabel (2005), did not arrive in time due to a dispute with a rival film, Secuestro Express (2005), and was disqualified.

The Liberator (2014), advanced to the December shortlists, but it was not nominated.

Most of the films submitted are primary in Spanish, with the exception of Gone with the River (2015), which was mostly in Warao. Below is a list of the films that have been submitted by Venezuela for review by the Academy for the award by year and the respective Academy Awards ceremony.

Year (Ceremony)	Film title used in nomination	Original Title	Director	Result
1977 (50th)	El Pez que Fuma		Román Chalbaud	Not nominated
1984 (57th)	The House of Water	La casa de Agua	Jacobo Penzo	Not nominated
1985 (58th)	Oriana		Fina Torres	Not nominated
1991 (64th)	Jericho		Luis Alberto Lamata	Not nominated
1994 (67th)	Knocks at My Door	Golpes a mi Puerta	Alejandro Saderman	Not nominated
1995 (68th)	Sicario		José Ramón Novoa	Not nominated
1997 (70th)	One Life and Two Trails	Una vida y dos mandados	Alberto Arvelo	Not nominated
1998 (71st)	Loop	Rizo	Julio Sosa	Not nominated
1999 (72nd)	Glue Sniffer	Huelepega: Ley de la Calle	Elia Schneider	Not nominated
2000 (73rd)	Oro Diablo		José Ramón Novoa	Not nominated
2001 (74th)	A House with a View of the Sea	Una casa con vista al mar	Alberto Arvelo	Not nominated
2002 (75th)	The Archangel's Feather	La pluma del arcángel	Luis Manzo	Not nominated
2003 (76th)	Sangrador		Leonardo Henriquez	Not nominated
2004 (77th)	Punto y Raya		Elia Schneider	Not nominated
2005 (78th)	1888: The Extraordinary Voyage of the Santa Isabel		Alfredo Anzola	Disqualified
2006 (79th)	Maroa	Maroa: Una Niña de la Calle	Solveig Hoogesteijn	Not nominated
2007 (80th)	Postcards from Leningrad	Postales de Leningrado	Mariana Rondon	Not nominated
2008 (81st)	The Color of Fame	El tinte de la fama	Alberto Bellame	Not nominated
2009 (82nd)	Libertador Morales, el Justiciero		Efterpi Charalambidis	Not nominated
2010 (83rd)	Hermano		Marcel Rasquin	Not nominated
2011 (84th)	The Rumble of the Stones	El rumor de las piedras	Alejandro Bellame	Not nominated
2012 (85th)	Rock, Paper, Scissors	Piedra, papel o tijera	Hernán Jabes	Not nominated
2013 (86th)	Breach in the Silence	Brecha en el silencio	Luis Rodríguez and Andrés Rodríguez	Not nominated
2014 (87th)	The Liberator	Libertador	Alberto Arvelo	Made shortlist
2015 (88th)	Gone with the River	Dauna. Lo que lleva el río	Mario Crespo	Not nominated
2016 (89th)	From Afar	Desde allá	Lorenzo Vigas	Not nominated
2017 (90th)	El Inca		Ignacio Castillo Cottin	Not nominated
2018 (91st)	The Family	La familia	Gustavo Rondón Córdova	Not nominated
2019 (92nd)	Being Impossible	Yo, imposible	Patricia Ortega	Not nominated
2020 (93rd)	Once Upon a Time in Venezuela	Érase Una Vez en Venezuela, Congo Mirador	Anabel Rodríguez Ríos	Not nominated
2021 (94th)	The Inner Glow	Un destello interior	Andrés Eduardo Rodríguez and Luis Alejandro Rodríguez	Not nominated
2022 (95th)	The Box	La caja	Lorenzo Vigas	Not nominated
2023 (96th)	The Shadow of the Sun	La Sombra del Sol	Miguel Ángel Ferrer	Not nominated
2024 (97th)	Back to Life	Vuelve a la vida	Luis Carlos Hueck and Alfredo Hueck	Not nominated
2025 (98th)	Alí Primera	Alí Primera - La Película	Daniel Yegres	Not nominated
2026 (99th)	Death Has No Master	La muerte no tiene dueño	Jorge Thielen Armand	Pending
