= Urban Vision =

American entertainment company

Urban Vision Entertainment, Inc
- Type: Animation film studio
- Industry: Media and Entertainment
- Founded: July 1996; 30 years ago
- Founder: Mataichiro Yamamoto
- Defunct: November 11, 2016
- Headquarters: Los Angeles, California
- Key people: Mataichiro Yamamoto (CEO)
- Products: Anime, Live-action
- Divisions: AsiaVision

Urban Vision Entertainment Inc. was an American-based production/distribution company created in Los Angeles, California formed in July 1996 by Mataichiro Yamamoto to help introduce the animation medium known as anime to the American mainstream.

== History ==
Urban Vision Entertainment was formed in July 1996 by Mataichiro Yamamoto to help introduce the alternative animation genre known as anime to mainstream media. The company primarily produced and acquired Japanese animation for direct-to-home video release. Urban Vision founder Mataichiro Yamamoto helped pioneer the anime genre in the US with the computer-generated theatrical release, Golgo 13: The Professional in 1983.

Urban Vision worked closely with the world-renowned Studio Madhouse animation studio in Tokyo, Japan (Wicked City, Ninja Scroll, Vampire Hunter D). The company's initial release, another Madhouse project, was Bio Hunter, released on home video in July 1997. Additional Urban Vision releases included Gatchaman, Twilight of the Dark Master, Dragon Slayer, Psycho Diver: Soul Siren and Final Fantasy: Legend of the Crystals.

In the mid-2000s Urban Vision shifted its focus from anime to live-action movies with the launch of two sub-labels, Ciudad for Spanish-language films and AsiaVision for Japanese-language films.

=== Decline ===
Urban Vision became inactive since the late 00's, not acquiring any more titles. On September 7, 2010, the online retailer Right Stuf removed all of their Urban Vision catalog due to the distributor not shipping out orders to them. The following day, Urban Vision released a statement saying that the company had been restructuring itself and were halting their home video production unit and focusing on digital distribution. In November 2016, the company was shut down. Currently, a majority of their titles have since been re-licensed and re-released by Discotek Media and Sentai Filmworks.

== Films licensed by Urban Vision Entertainment ==
=== Anime ===
- Bio Hunter
- Dragon Slayer: The Legend of Heroes
- DNA Sights 999.9
- Final Fantasy: Legend of the Crystals
- Gatchaman (1994) (now licensed by Sentai Filmworks)
- Golgo 13: Queen Bee
- Hurricane Polymar (now licensed by Discotek Media)
- Ninja Scroll: The Series (now licensed by Discotek Media)
- Pet Shop of Horrors (now licensed by Sentai Filmworks)
- The Professional: Golgo 13 (from Streamline Pictures, now licensed by Discotek Media)
- Psycho Diver: Soul Siren
- Strange Dawn (Lil' Vision)
- Space Adventure Cobra (from Streamline Pictures, now licensed by Discotek Media)
- Tekkaman Blade II (now licensed by Discotek Media)
- Twilight of the Dark Master
- Goku Midnight Eye (now licensed by Discotek Media)
- The Cockpit
- Wild 7 (from Enoki Films)
- Vampire Hunter D (from Streamline Pictures, now licensed by Sentai Filmworks)
- Vampire Hunter D: Bloodlust (now licensed by GKIDS)
- Wicked City (from Streamline Pictures, now licensed by Discotek Media)

=== Live action (AsiaVision) ===
- Azumi
- Azumi 2: Death or Love
- Curse, Death & Spirit
- Kill Devil
- Kokkuri

=== Live action (Ciudad) ===
- Black Wind
- By My Side Again
- Doña Bárbara
- Espaldas Mojadas
- Fugitives
- Glue Sniffer
- Oro Diablo
- Siciaro
- Survive
- The Hidden One

=== Miscellaneous ===
- Slammin' Sammy: The Sammy Sosa Story (American animation; Lil' Vision)
