= Alexandra Henao =

Venezuelan cinematographer and film director

Alexandra Henao is a Venezuelan cinematographer and film director who studied at the National Film and Television School in the United Kingdom.

In 2011, she shot The Rumble of the Stones, which was selected as the Venezuelan entry for the Best Foreign Language Film at the 84th Academy Awards

At the 28th Goya Awards in 2014, the film she shot Blue and Not So Pink won the prize for Best Foreign Film in the Spanish Language.

== Filmography ==
- Dirección Opuesta (feature)
- La Noche De Las Dos Lunas (feature) (2018)
- Blue and Not So Pink (feature) (2013)
- Buenos, Bellas y Democráticos - The Good, The Beautiful and the Democratic (short) (2012) (written and directed)
- Er relajo der Loro (feature) (2012)
- Between Shadows and Whispers (documentary) (2011)
- Debaixo d'água (short)
- The Rumble of the Stones (El rumor de las piedras) (feature) (2011)
- Cortos Interruptus (2011)
- La uva (short) (2009) (directed)
- Puras joyitas (2007)
- La librería (short) (2007)
- La tarea (short) (2007)
- Atenea y Afrodita (short) (2005)
- El chancecito (short) (2004)
- La tranca (documentary) (2004)
- I Nocturno (short) (2003)
- 900 pánico (short) (2003)
