= 1888: The Extraordinary Voyage of the Santa Isabel =

2005 film

- Film poster
- Directed by: Alfredo Anzola
- Based on: The Mighty Orinoco by Jules Verne
- Starring: Marco Villarubia
- Release date: March 2005 (Guadalajara)
- Running time: 95 minutes
- Country: Venezuela
- Language: Spanish

1888: The Extraordinary Voyage of the Santa Isabel (Spanish: 1888: El Extraordinario Viaje de la Santa Isabel) is a 2005 Venezuelan drama film co-written and directed by Alfredo Anzola, based on the book The Mighty Orinoco by Jules Verne. The film premiered at the 2005 Guadalajara International Film Festival. It was the country's submission to the Academy Awards for Best Foreign Language Film in 2005, but was disqualified.

== Synopsis ==
Julio Verne, writer and adventurer, becomes bored with his life and decides to sail down the Amazon. He arrives in South America at the Venezuelan coast, meeting Italian geographer Conde Ermanno Stradelli; Stradelli has a mission from Rome to map the Orinoco. Verne decides to join him, and they gain another late addition: Juan de Kermor. Through the journey, Verne and Stradelli discover that Juan is actually a woman, Juana, who has been searching for a way to travel down the Orinoco looking for her father.

== Cast ==
- Marco Villarubia as Julio Verne
- Kristin Pardo as Juana de Kermor
- Ronnie Nordenflycht as Conde Stradelli
- Elba Escobar as Honorine Verne
- Julio Bustamante as Coronel Kermor

== Production ==
The screenplay was written by Gustavo Michelena, Rafael Arraiz and Alfredo Anzola, based on the Verne story The Mighty Orinoco. The film combines Verne's story, about the character Jeanne de Kermor, with a fictionalized framing narrative of the real Vernes and Count Stradelli being part of the journey.

== Oscars selection ==
The film was chosen as Venezuela's 2005 entry for the Academy Award for Best Foreign Language Film. However, incomplete paperwork led to the entry being disqualified. At the time of its selection, the choice of the CNAC was controversial; the film Secuestro Express by Jonathan Jakubowicz was also eligible for nomination and was much more successful both nationally and internationally. Jakubowicz criticized the choice not to nominate his film, which is about kidnapping and gangs in Venezuela, saying that it was overtly political because his film was artistically superior. Anzola did not comment on the artistic quality of either film, but said that Jakubowicz, a relative newcomer to the industry at the time, was upset because he wanted his first feature film to receive a nomination and that he would be calmer with more experience. Jakubowicz was forced to leave Venezuela because of Secuestro Express after receiving threats from then-President Hugo Chávez. Ultimately, no submission was accepted from Venezuela in 2005.
