= Arthur Albert =

American cinematograpgher (born 1946)

- Born: Arturo Albert; July 9, 1946 (age 80); Caracas, Venezuela
- Education: New Hampton School (1964); Columbia University (BA, 1969)
- Years active: 1971–2019

Arthur Albert (born Arturo Albert on July 9, 1946) is a Venezuelan born American cinematographer and television director.

== Education ==
He is an alum of New Hampton School (1964) and Columbia University (BA, 1969).

Albert has worked in episodic television. Working as cinematographer on the television series The Wonder Years, ER and The Gates. He also directed episodes of all of those series. Albert was also the cinematographer of the 1986 TV movie My Two Loves.

In 2001, he directed the short film Dating in L.A., his only film directing credit.

== Filmography ==
=== Film ===
Year	Title	Director	Notes
1971	Is There Sex After Death?	Alan Abel; Jeanne Abel	With Gerald Cotts
1972	Please Stand By	Jack Milton; Joanna Milton	With Paul Goldsmith
1976	Los muertos sí salen	Alfredo Lugo	
1976	The Faking of the President	Alan Abel; Jeanne Abel	
1976	Nomadic Lives	Mark Obenhaus	
1977	El vividor	Manuel Díaz Punceles	
1978	Muerte en el paraíso	Michel Katz	
1983	Carpion milagrero	Michel Katz	With Luis Jacko
1983	La gata borracha	Román Chalbaud	
1984	The House of Water	Jacobo Penzo	
1984	Night of the Comet	Thom Eberhardt	
1985	The Boys Next Door	Penelope Spheeris	
1986	Odd Jobs	Mark Story	
1986	Streets of Gold	Joe Roth	
1987	The Squeeze	Roger Young	
1987	The Principal	Christopher Cain	
1989	Miss Firecracker	Thomas Schlamme	
1990	Heart Condition	James D. Parriott	
1991	By the Sword	Jeremy Kagan	
1992	Passed Away	Charlie Peters	
1993	Surf Ninjas	Neal Israel	With Victor Hammer
1995	One Night Stand	Talia Shire	
1996	Happy Gilmore	Dennis Dugan	
1997	Beverly Hills Ninja	Dennis Dugan	
1998	Dirty Work	Bob Saget	
2001	Saving Silverman	Dennis Dugan	
2001	Max Keeble's Big Move	Tim Hill	
2006	Puff, Puff, Pass	Mekhi Phifer	
2013	The Chosen Ones	Maria Cruz	
2018	Benjamin	Bob Saget	

==== Director ====
Year	Title	Episode(s)
1992-1993	The Wonder Years	"The Lost Weekend"
1992-1993	The Wonder Years	"Kevin Delivers"
1992-1993	The Wonder Years	"Alice in Autoland"
1992-1993	The Wonder Years	"Reunion"
1996	Bailey Kipper's P.O.V.	"Pilot"
1996	Bailey Kipper's P.O.V.	"A Living Doll"
1996	Bailey Kipper's P.O.V.	"Talk Ain't Cheap"
2004-2005	ER	"An Intern's Guide to the Galaxy"
2004-2005	ER	"Wake Up"
2010	The Gates	"Bad Moon Rising"

== Recognition ==
Year	Award	Category	Title	Episode	Result	Ref.
1997	Directors Guild of America	Outstanding Directing – Children's Programs	Bailey Kipper's P.O.V.	"Talk Ain't Cheap"	Nominated	
