= List of 2010 box office number-one films in Venezuela =

This is a list of films which have placed number one at the weekend box office in Venezuela during 2010.

== Number-one films ==
†	This implies the highest-grossing movie of the year.

#	Date	Film	Gross	Notes
1	January 3, 2010	Avatar	$764,134	
2	January 10, 2010	Avatar	$804,602	
3	January 17, 2010	Avatar	$321,233	
4	January 24, 2010	Tooth Fairy	$240,675	
5	January 31, 2010	Tooth Fairy	$238,526	
6	February 7, 2010	Old Dogs	$273,396	
7	February 14, 2010	Percy Jackson & the Olympians: The Lightning Thief	$240,668	
8	February 21, 2010	Old Dogs	$234,797	
9	February 28, 2010	Old Dogs	$220,241	
10	March 7, 2010	Alice in Wonderland	$628,604	
11	March 14, 2010	Alice in Wonderland	$602,006	
12	March 21, 2010	Alice in Wonderland	$493,098	
13	March 28, 2010	Alice in Wonderland	$291,301	
14	April 4, 2010	How to Train Your Dragon	$271,301	
15	April 11, 2010	Date Night	$198,981	
16	April 18, 2010	Clash of the Titans	$536,976	
17	April 25, 2010	Clash of the Titans	$439,711	
18	May 2, 2010	Iron Man 2	$418,341	
19	May 9, 2010	Iron Man 2	$236,187	
20	May 16, 2010	A Nightmare on Elm Street	$270,756	
21	May 23, 2010	A Nightmare on Elm Street	$254,536	
22	May 30, 2010	Marmaduke	$201,269	
23	June 6, 2010	Robin Hood	$272,388	
24	June 13, 2010	Robin Hood	$203,329	
25	June 20, 2010	Toy Story 3	$729,863	
26	June 27, 2010	Toy Story 3	$749,985	
27	July 4, 2010	The Twilight Saga: Eclipse	$711,187	
28	July 11, 2010	Shrek Forever After	$682,613	
29	July 18, 2010	Shrek Forever After	$741,401	
30	July 25, 2010	Shrek Forever After	$614,024	
31	August 1, 2010	Shrek Forever After	$470,193	
32	August 8, 2010	The Karate Kid	$409,123	
33	August 15, 2010	Despicable Me	$465,730	
34	August 22, 2010	Despicable Me	$407,667	
35	August 29, 2010	The Last Airbender	$420,004	
36	September 5, 2010	The Sorcerer's Apprentice	$465,730	
37	September 12, 2010	Resident Evil: Afterlife	$440,431	
38	September 19, 2010	Resident Evil: Afterlife	$368,845	
39	September 26, 2010	Resident Evil: Afterlife	$199,699	
40	October 3, 2010	Legend of the Guardians: The Owls of Ga'Hoole	$332,234	
41	October 10, 2010	Legend of the Guardians: The Owls of Ga'Hoole	$281,138	
42	October 17, 2010	Legend of the Guardians: The Owls of Ga'Hoole	$194,044	
43	October 24, 2010	La Hora Cero	$174,838	
44	October 31, 2010	Saw 3D	$250,576	
45	November 7, 2010	Paranormal Activity 2	$197,020	
46	November 14, 2010	Life as We Know It	$179,213	
47	November 21, 2010	Harry Potter and the Deathly Hallows – Part 1	$940,949	Harry Potter and the Deathly Hallows – Part 1 had the highest weekend debut of 2010.
48	November 28, 2010	Tangled †	$687,730	
49	December 5, 2010	Tangled †	$718,219	
50	December 12, 2010	Megamind	$455,096	
51	December 19, 2010	Tron: Legacy	$465,499	
52	December 26, 2010	Tron: Legacy	$348,980	
53	January 2, 2011	Tron: Legacy	$225,720	

== Highest-grossing films ==
Highest-grossing films of 2010 in Venezuela
Rank	Title	Studio	Domestic Gross
1.	Tangled	Walt Disney Pictures	$6,863,748
2.	Toy Story 3	Walt Disney Pictures / Pixar Animation Studios	$6,339,322
3.	Shrek Forever After	Paramount Pictures / DreamWorks Animation	$5,984,037
4.	Harry Potter and the Deathly Hallows – Part 1	Warner Bros. / Heyday Films	$4,743,014
5.	Alice in Wonderland	Walt Disney Pictures	$4,335,113
6.	La Hora Cero	Centro Nacional Autónomo de Cinematografía	$3,947,360
7.	Tron: Legacy	Walt Disney Pictures	$3,419,740
8.	The Twilight Saga: Eclipse	Summit Entertainment	$3,220,661
9.	Clash of the Titans	Warner Bros.	$3,010,415
10.	The Karate Kid	Columbia Pictures	$2,638,033
