= Wild Seven =

Wild Seven may refer to:

- A fictional rebel group in the 2003 Japanese film Battle Royale II: Requiem
- A cigarette brand from the novel Battle Royale (Japanese brand Mild Seven)
- Wild 7, a 1969 Japanese manga series, later adapted into a TV drama, an anime and a live action film
- Wild Seven (film), a 2006 crime drama film written and directed by James M. Hausler
