= Cruz Salmerón Acosta =

Venezuelan poet

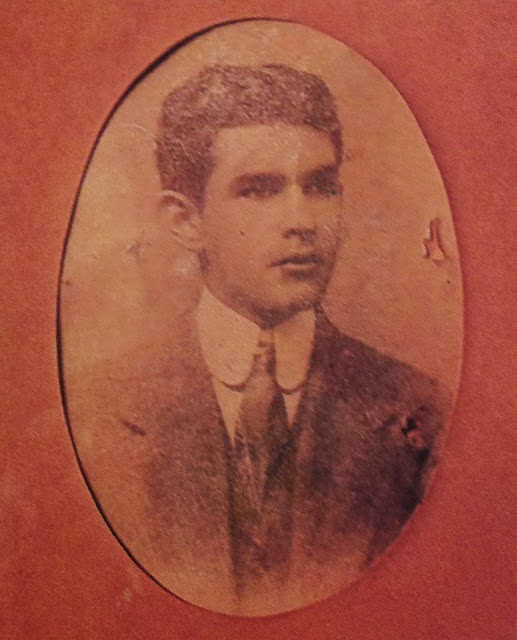
- Cruz Salmerón Acosta, c. 1911
- Born: 3 January 1892; Manicuare, Venezuela
- Died: 30 July 1929 (aged 37), Manicuare, Venezuela
- Occupations: poet, writer

Signature
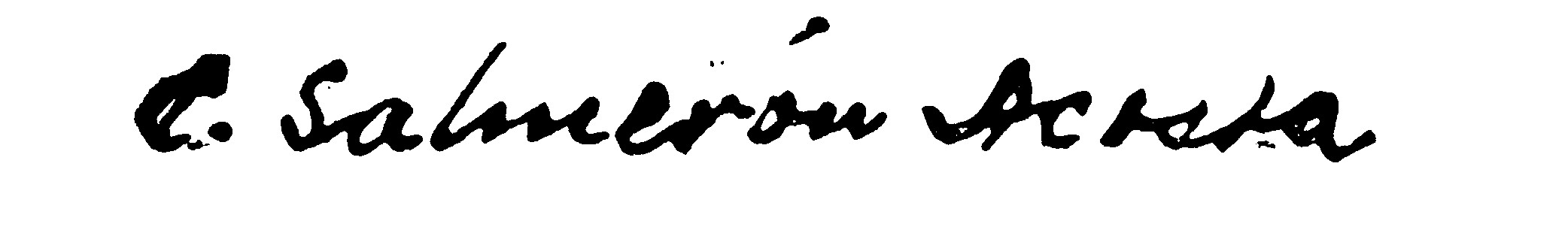

Cruz María Salmerón Acosta (Born January 3, 1892, in Manicuare, Venezuela – 30 July 1929 in Manicuare) was a Venezuelan poet. His sonnets were influenced by the movement of modernismo.

== Biography ==
He received his early education in the home of Petra and Carlota González, neighbors in Manicuare. He then moved to Cumaná entering in the school of Pedro Luis Cedeño, and attended high school in the Federal Lyceum, in the same city. In 1910, he traveled to Caracas and began to study political science in the Central University of Venezuela. By 1911 he wrote his first sonnet Cielo y Mar (Sky and Sea) dedicated to his friend, the poet José Antonio Ramos Sucre. In addition, he contributed to publications such as: Satiricón, La U, Claros del Alba, Élite, Renacimiento, El Universal, El Nuevo Diario and Broche de Oro.

Two years later he was diagnosed with leprosy. Doctors advised him to return to Manicuare to avoid a medical quarantine. Salmerón continued in his studies despite the warning. In 1913 he returned to his hometown after the government of Juan Vicente Gómez closed the university.

After his return, his sister Encarnación died, and his brother Antoñico was killed by the civil chief of the town. As a result, Salmerón decided to confront the authority and was jailed for a year in Cumaná. He then returned to Manicuare, isolating himself in a small house built especially for him. There he would spend his last fifteen years.

During the month of July, 1929, Manicuare suffered a severe drought and after his death on 30 July, rains returned. This coincidence has become part of the heritage of the region, popularly expressed in songs like Canción Cumanesa, by singer-songwriter Alí Primera.

A compilation of his work was published in 1952 entitled Fuente de Amargura (Bitterness Fountain). In 1983, film director Jacobo Penzo made a movie based on his life: La Casa de Agua (The House of Water). The municipality, Manicuare, was renamed Cruz Salmerón Acosta in his honor.
