= Kill devil =

Kill devil may refer to:

- Kill Devil, a Japanese film
- Kill Devil Hills, the site of the Wright Brothers National Memorial in North Carolina, U.S.
- Kill-Devil, a slang term for rum
