= Patrick Ball (actor) =

American actor (born 1989)

- Born: Patrick Marron Ball; November 10, 1989 (age 36); Summerfield, North Carolina, U.S.
- Education: University of North Carolina, Greensboro (BFA); Yale University (MFA)
- Occupation: Actor
- Years active: 2012–present

Patrick Marron Ball (born November 10, 1989) is an American actor. He is best known for his role as Dr. Frank Langdon on the HBO Max medical drama television series The Pitt (2025–present), for which he has received critical acclaim and nominations for the Primetime Emmy Award for Outstanding Supporting Actor in a Drama Series and the Critics' Choice Television Award for Best Supporting Actor in a Drama Series.

== Early life and education ==
Ball was born to Jim and Lee Ann Ball; his father is a former paramedic and his mother is a former emergency room nurse. He has two younger siblings, one of whom works as an occupational therapist. He is a descendant of the Ball family of Charleston, who owned farms where Carolina Gold rice was produced, and some of his ancestors are buried near Strawberry Chapel. Of his heritage, Ball said, "I'm still enjoying a lot of generational privileges that were afforded to me by that family history. It's something that my parents really thought it was important for us to acknowledge and understand."

Ball grew up in Summerfield, North Carolina, and attended Northwest Guilford High School. As a student, he participated in athletics and theatre, though he did not view performing as a particular passion at this time. He attended the University of North Carolina at Greensboro, where he studied broadcast journalism, but he dropped out before graduating to pursue acting. He was motivated to pursue acting after a friend requested that he perform a 10-minute theatre scene; the head of the University of North Carolina at Greensboro's theatre department subsequently encouraged him to become an actor.

After moving to New York City and spending five years acting in local theater productions throughout the United States, Ball received a Certificate in Drama from the David Geffen School of Drama at Yale University in 2022. He auditioned to the program with Hamlet's first soliloquy. That year, he also completed a BFA from the University of North Carolina at Greensboro, which allowed his Certificate in Drama to be converted to a Master of Fine Arts degree.

== Career ==
=== Television ===
Following his debut as a guest on Law & Order in 2023, Ball's next work in television was playing Dr. Frank Langdon in the HBO Max medical drama The Pitt. His casting was announced on July 12, 2024. To prepare for the role, he spoke to real physicians and nurses who have experienced addiction. Reporting on Ball's portrayal of his character's journey towards sobriety and regaining his confidence in the emergency department, Shadan Larki for Awards Buzz praised his performance for its subtlety and restraint, which culminated into "an emotional payoff that feels fully earned." Ball was nominated for the Critics' Choice Television Award for Best Supporting Actor in a Drama Series for his role as Langdon. With his co-stars, he won the Actor Award for Outstanding Performance by an Ensemble in a Drama Series for 2025. He signed with The Gersh Agency in December 2025.

=== Theater ===
Ball starred as Prince Hamlet in Robert O'Hara's production of Hamlet at the Mark Taper Forum from May to July 2025. Ball had always wanted to participate in a production of Hamlet, and prepared for the play by watching Mulholland Drive and The Big Clock. Emily Parise praised Ball's balanced portrayal of Prince Hamlet, while Kevin Taft and Bruce R. Feldman commended the charisma present in his performance; this assessment was seconded by the Los Angeles Times's Charles McNulty, who nonetheless made critical notes regarding Ball's delivery.

In April 2026, Ball made his Broadway debut playing Andrew in Gina Gionfriddo's Becky Shaw at the Hayes Theater in New York. Writing for The Guardian, Adrian Horton described Ball's performance as "electric", while other critics praised its subtlety.

== Personal life ==
Ball has been in a relationship with actress Elysia Roorbach since October 2023. She guest starred as a patient of his character on season 2 of The Pitt. They met while performing in a stage production of Las Adventuras de Juan Planchard in Miami.

Ball has experienced addiction. He faced suspensions throughout high school, and often did drugs recreationally. He was initially only accepted into the University of North Carolina at Greensboro's BFA program on probation due to his habit of drinking, partying, and being arrested. As of February 2026, he has been sober for four years.

Prior to his television success, Ball worked four jobs in New York, including in a coffee shop and as a wardrobe assistant for And Just Like That.... He considered joining the FBI, becoming a Merchant Marine, and working in an Alaskan fishing camp in order to financially support himself. While studying at the David Geffen School of Drama, his parents urged him to drop out and pursue a more stable career so he would not accumulate more debt. After three months of working on The Pitt, Ball was able to clear $80,000 worth of student debt.

== Acting credits ==
=== Television ===
Year	Title	Role	Notes	Ref.
2023	Law & Order	Jason Wheeler	Episode: "Almost Famous"	
2025–present	The Pitt	Dr. Frank Langdon	Main role; 29 episodes	

=== Theater ===
Year	Title	Role	Venue	Notes	Ref.
2012	The Illusion	Pleribo/Adraste/ Florilame	Triad Stage		
2012	Romeo and Juliet	Sampson	High Point Theatre		
2015	Shining City	Laurence	Barrington Stage Company		
2015	Cat on a Hot Tin Roof	Brick	Triad Stage		
2016	Sex with Strangers	Ethan	TheaterWorks		
2016	All My Sons	Chris	Repertory Theatre of St. Louis		
2017	Sex with Strangers	Ethan	Hurst Theatre		
2017	The Lover	John	Shakespeare Theatre Company		
2017	The Collection	Bill	Shakespeare Theatre Company		
2018	The Passion of Teresa Rae King	Levon Lankford	Triad Stage		
2023	The XIXth	Peter Norman	Old Globe Theatre		
2023	Las Aventuras de Juan Planchard	Michael	Colony Theatre		
2025	Hamlet	Prince Hamlet	Mark Taper Forum	Los Angeles	
2026	Becky Shaw	Andrew	Hayes Theater	Broadway	

== Awards and nominations ==
Award	Year	Category	Nominated work	Result	Ref.
Actor Awards	2026	Outstanding Performance by an Ensemble in a Drama Series	The Pitt	Won	
Astra TV Awards	2026	Best Supporting Actor in a Drama Series	The Pitt	Won	
Critics' Choice Television Awards	2026	Best Supporting Actor in a Drama Series	The Pitt	Nominated	
Primetime Emmy Awards	2026	Outstanding Supporting Actor in a Drama Series	The Pitt	Nominated	
