= Final Fantasy: Legend of the Crystals =

1994 original video animation

- North American cover

ファイナルファンタジー (Fainaru Fantajī)
- Genre: Adventure, fantasy, comedy
- Original video animation
- Directed by: Rintaro (series director); Naoto Kanda (#2); Tomohiko Ohkuda (#3)
- Produced by: Tetsuo Daitoku; Yūji Takae; Yojirō Shirakawa
- Written by: Satoru Akahori
- Music by: Masahiko Sato
- Studio: Madhouse
- Licensed by: NA: Urban Vision
- Released: March 21, 1994 – July 21, 1994
- Runtime: 30 minutes each
- Episodes: 4

Final Fantasy: Legend of the Crystals, released in Japan as Final Fantasy (Japanese: ファイナルファンタジー, Hepburn: Fainaru Fantajī), is an anime OVA based on the Final Fantasy series of role-playing video games. It was released in Japan in 1994 and distributed by Urban Vision across two volumes in 1997 and 1998 in North America on VHS. Urban Vision has since lost the distribution license and to date the series hasn't been released in any other format, such as Blu-ray, following its initial video release.

Legend of the Crystals takes place 200 years after the events of Final Fantasy V. It is divided into four thirty-minute OVA episodes spanning two VHS tapes.

== Plot ==
The story takes place in the same world as Final Fantasy V, named Planet R, set two hundred years in the future, where three of the four crystals have been stolen. The original heroes in Final Fantasy V are now legends of the past and a new evil, Deathgyunos, has risen on the Black Moon and must be dealt with. Mid, a recurring character from Final Fantasy V, contacts a new hero and heroine: the young adventurous swordsman Prettz and apprentice summoner Linally. They eventually meet the sky pirate Rouge and Valkus, commander of the Iron Wing.

== Characters ==
The OVA introduces several original characters and a few characters who made an appearance in Final Fantasy V.

The main protagonist, Prettz, is a headstrong and reckless young man with feelings for Linally who rides a motorcycle and uses a nodachi and spiked bombs as weapons. He is accompanied by Linally, a brave, young, blue-haired girl and direct descendant of Bartz from Final Fantasy V. She is a novice in the art of summoning magic who can only conjure chocobos, and becomes a vessel for the Wind Crystal after the others were stolen. Supporting characters include: Valkus, the bumbling general of the Tycoon air force, who, despite his aggressiveness and large size, is fiercely loyal to Queen Lenna; Rouge, a scantily-clad sky pirate captain with a love for all things shiny, who attempts to take the Wind Crystal from Linally and company; and Mid, grandson of Cid from Final Fantasy V, an engineer who returns as a ghost to aid the heroes with his advice and general knowledge of historical events important to the series.

The antagonist of Final Fantasy: Legend of the Crystals is Ra Devil, a powerful wizard intent on gaining the power of the Void for his own ambition. He steals Cid's brain in hopes of using its knowledge of the four crystals to his advantage, assuming his true form, Deathgyunos, once he succeeds.

== Production ==
The OVA was produced by NTT Publishing with animation by Japanese studio Madhouse simply under the title Final Fantasy. It was originally released in Japan across four episodes on VHS between March and July 1994. A North American English dubbed version was released a little over three years later by Urban Vision under the title Final Fantasy: Legend of the Crystals split across two volumes. Volume 1, which contained the "Wind Chapter" and "Fire Chapter" was made available on December 9, 1997, followed by a second volume containing the "Dragon Chapter" and "Star Chapter" on February 3, 1998. A boxed set containing both volumes in a single slipcase was released in the region on November 17, 1998. It is the first animated media produced for the Final Fantasy series, as well as the first direct sequel to a Final Fantasy game.

The original score was composed by Masahiko Sato and contains numerous cues to Nobuo Uematsu's original soundtrack to Final Fantasy V including the opening and the Chocobo theme.

=== Episodes ===
Legend of the Crystals is separated into four 30-minute episodes. It was released in VHS format with the first and second episodes contained on the first video, and episodes three and four on the second, later released as a boxed set.

No.	Title	Japanese release	English release
1	"Wind Chapter"; Transliteration: "Kaze no shō" (Japanese: 風の章)	March 21, 1994	December 9, 1997
2	"Fire Chapter"; Transliteration: "Honō no shō" (Japanese: 炎の章)	May 21, 1994	December 9, 1997
3	"Dragon Chapter"; Transliteration: "Ryū no shō" (Japanese: 竜の章)	June 21, 1994	February 3, 1998
4	"Star Chapter"; Transliteration: "Hoshi no shō" (Japanese: 星の章)	July 21, 1994	February 3, 1998

== Related media ==
Several media based on the OVA was released on 1994. Two soundtracks were released for the OVA. The first volume was released on May 21 and contains tracks from the first two OVA episodes. The second contains tracks from the last two episodes and was released on July 21. A guidebook titled Final Fantasy Video Graffiti: Animation Perfect Guide (ファイナルファンタジー・ビデオグラフィティ―アニメーションパーフェクトガイド) was released on September 1. A two-volume manga adaptation was released on December 2. Each volume also adapts two episodes each.

== Reception ==
In the 1990s, the anime received positive reviews from critics. Shidoshi of GameFan magazine gave it an A rating in May 1998, stating it was one of "the finest anime I've seen in quite" a while. The reviewer ranked it the best anime of the month, above several episodes of Neon Genesis Evangelion reviewed that same month. The same year, Charles McCarter of EX praised Legend of the Crystals heavily, noting the similarity to Square's existing characters helped lend credence to the Final Fantasy title. He additionally noted, with exception to the backgrounds, the animation was good, and the dubbed voices for the English version were believable, notably Linally's and Prettz's, and added "Final Fantasy provides a good balance of action, adventure, and just enough humour to make the characters personable".

=== Retrospective ===
Retrospectively, the OVA has received a mixed reception. Adam Arnold of Animefringe criticized it as one of several failed attempts to translate Final Fantasy to film, calling it a "lacklustre and drawn-out retelling of Final Fantasy V". Sam Yu of THEM Anime Reviews rated it 1 out of 5 stars and called it "a cruel mockery of all Final Fantasy stands for", citing it as basing the storyline off the "weakest" title in the series, and citing the finale as anticlimactic and the villain disappointing. Ramsey Isler of IGN later described it as notable for being the first sequel to a Final Fantasy title, but noted that it "did not become a favourite addition to the Final Fantasy Legacy", citing its animation as "nothing special" and noting its reliance on comedy over dramatic story telling. Richard Eisenbeis of Kotaku called the film "a mess" for its un-Final Fantasy aesthetic and fan service.

Other critics were more positive. GameSpot staff described it as a worthy adaptation of the series, and noted while the animation was "somewhat simple", the story was immersive and praised it for not meandering to include all aspects of the game.

== See also ==
- List of Square Enix video game franchises
