= Gone with the River =

2015 film

- Film poster
- Directed by: Mario Crespo
- Written by: Mario Crespo
- Starring: Eddie Gómez
- Release date: March 2015
- Running time: 104 minutes
- Country: Venezuela
- Language: Warao

Gone with the River (Spanish: Dauna. Lo que lleva el río) is a 2015 Venezuelan drama film directed by Mario Crespo. The film is spoken in Warao. It was selected as the Venezuelan entry for the Best Foreign Language Film at the 88th Academy Awards but it was not nominated.

== Cast ==
- Eddie Gómez as Tarsicio
- Yordana Medrano as Dauna
- Diego Armando Salazar as Padre Julio

== See also ==
- List of submissions to the 88th Academy Awards for Best Foreign Language Film
- List of Venezuelan submissions for the Academy Award for Best Foreign Language Film
