= The House of Water =

1983 film

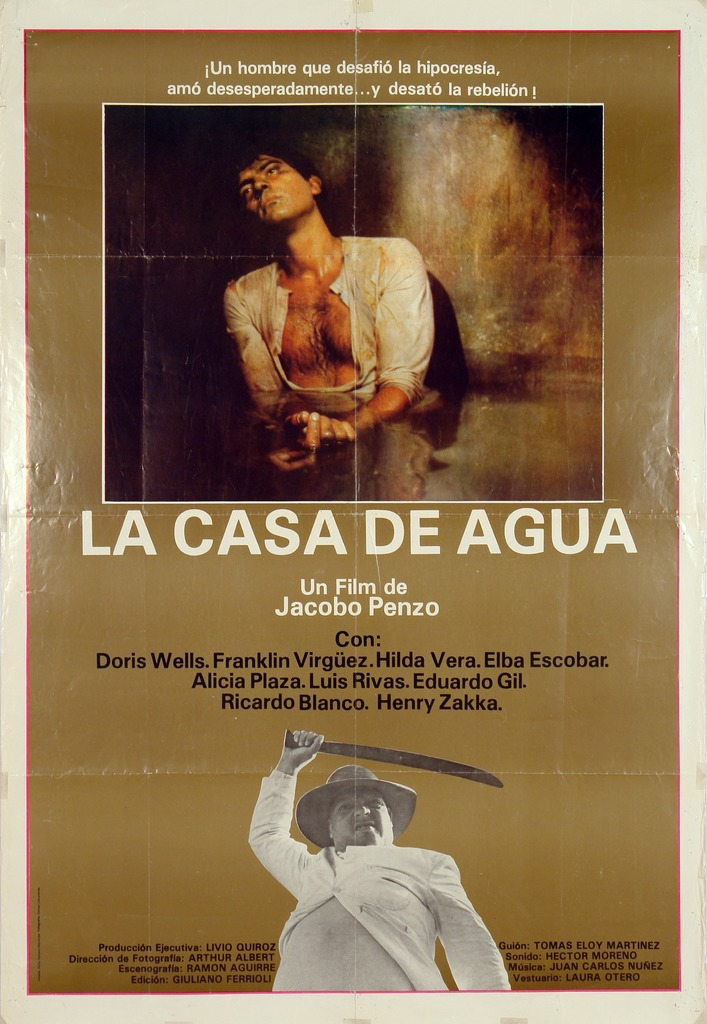
- Film poster
- Directed by: Jacobo Penzo
- Written by: Tomás Eloy Martínez
- Starring: Franklin Vírgüez
- Cinematography: Arthur Albert
- Release date: 1983
- Running time: 95 minutes
- Country: Venezuela
- Language: Spanish

The House of Water (Spanish: La casa de agua) is a 1983 Venezuelan drama film of the nation's Golden Age directed by Jacobo Penzo. The film was selected as the Venezuelan entry for the Best Foreign Language Film at the 57th Academy Awards, but was not accepted as a nominee.

== Plot ==
A young man, Cruz Salmerón Acosta, from the impoverished village of Manicaure, Araya, rejects the dictatorship of Juan Vicente Gómez. Despite fighting for his ideals, he achieves nothing, returning to Manicaure with few opportunities. He ultimately dies alone of leprosy.

== Cast ==
- Franklin Vírgüez as Cruz Elías Salmerón Acosta
- Doris Wells as Asunción León Costa
- Hilda Vera as Cruz' mother
- Alicia Plaza as Consuelo
- Elba Escobar as Ana Dolores Ramos
- Henry Zakka as Curandero
- Edgar Serrano

== Production ==
The film was scored by Juan Carlos Núñez, and includes a cameo by film critic Rodolfo Izaguirre playing a priest. It was one of the first films to receive funding from FONCINE.

== Analysis ==
At the Sofía en el cine film website, the film is said to go against traditional modern (particularly American) movie narratives which typically show that destiny is both achievable and aligns with the desires and ideals of the hero. To defy expectations, the film shows Cruz' failure to achieve what he really wants. Sofía en el cine also suggests that the film frames this to suggest that the individual can be brought down by their environment, that misery of nation creates misery of its people even as they try to escape it.

The name of the film is analyzed by Alexis Correia, examining the symbolism through the film that the idea of a house of water relates to; Correia proposes that first, it refers to being in the womb, then a life of false appearances, and then the house where Cruz dies alone. Correia also suggests that water, as vital to life, is not present in the 'house' of Manicaure, which is experiencing drought.

== Response ==
Alexis Correia looks at the characterization of Cruz, suggesting it is mostly enabled by the dialogue written by Tomás Eloy Martínez and actor Franklin Vírgüez' "timeless" appearance; in the film, Cruz cares more about ideals than his art or youthfulness, which Correia believes is captured by the actor and multiple memorable lines. Correia also praises the cinematography, some of which he compares to Eisenstein.

== See also ==
- List of submissions to the 57th Academy Awards for Best Foreign Language Film
- List of Venezuelan submissions for the Academy Award for Best Foreign Language Film
