= Glue Sniffer =

Huelepega: Ley de la calle
- Film poster
- Directed by: Elia Schneider
- Produced by: José Ramón Novoa
- Starring: Jose Gregorio Rivas; Alfredo Medina; Luis Campos Pelón; Pedro Lander; Laureano Olivares
- Release date: 8 January 1999
- Running time: 110 minutes
- Countries: Venezuela; Spain
- Language: Spanish

Glue Sniffer (Spanish: Huelepega: Ley de la calle) is a 1999 drama film directed by Elia Schneider. It was an international co-production between Spain and Venezuela. It was Venezuela's official Best Foreign Language Film submission at the 72nd Academy Awards, but did not manage to receive a nomination.

It won at the 2000 International Human Rights Film Festival.

== Synopsis ==
The 11-year-old Oliver is driven out of his mother's house by abuse from her new boyfriend, and then he struggles to live on the streets. He tries to avoid the crime common to young homeless children, but life gets harder when a drug gang tries to recruit him.

== Cast ==
- Jose Gregorio Rivas - Oliver
- Alfredo Medina - Mocho
- Luis Campos Pelón - Chino
- Pedro Lander - Saúl
- Laureano Olivares - Pelao

== Production ==
The production examined real child homelessness as well as other social issues to inform the story, as well as using amateur actors and trying to create a documentary feel.

During filming in 1997, the Venezuelan National Institute for Minors (INAM) prevented filming from continuing over concerns for the amateur child actors involved; the production denounced this as an arbitrary block, as they had already been granted permission by courts presided over by a Juveniles Judge. Schneider proposed that INAM wanted to interfere with the narrative instead, as the motion allowed them to review all footage before release and unilaterally cut or edit parts in the name of protecting the image of the children. Nancy Montero from INAM said that they didn't want to prevent filming or anything else bad, they just wanted some time to edit the script before filming continued so that the children would not be psychologically harmed by the roles they were playing. However, filming had never stopped, only moved to secret locations.

== Reception ==
Economía Hoy wrote that the film was following the Latin American style of rejecting entertainment culture in favor of reflecting on society. It compares the film to the Schneider-produced and Novoa-directed 1994 Sicario, which also uses commonplace violence to enhance its narrative. Luisela Alvaray compared the film to Buñuel's Los Olvidados.

Rodolfo Izaguirre complements the film as having "merits that are not always found in other Venezuelan films: a worked script[,] efficient production work[,] art direction and costumes, and a cast in which professional actors such as Pedro Lander, Adolfo Cubas and Lucio Bueno, among others, move comfortably in the middle of real street children".

According to the Centro Nacional Autónomo de Cinematografía, the film saw a Venezuelan audience of 301,555.
