= Breach in the Silence =

2012 film

- Film poster
- Directed by: Luis Rodríguez; Andrés Rodríguez
- Starring: Vanessa Di Quattro
- Release date: 2012
- Country: Venezuela
- Language: Spanish

Breach in the Silence (Spanish: Brecha en el silencio) is a 2012 Venezuelan drama film directed by Luis Rodríguez and Andrés Rodríguez. The film was selected as the Venezuelan entry for the Best Foreign Language Film at the 86th Academy Awards, but it was not nominated.

== Plot ==
Ana (Di Quattro) is a deaf-and-dumb girl from an impoverished family. She works in a sewing factory with her mother, Julia (Cuervos), who is enamored with the drunk and abusive Antonio (León) and ignores her three children. After the youngest, Manuel (Pimentel), witnesses Antonio rape Julia, Ana debates taking revenge on the man who has ruined her family.

The Hollywood Reporter writes that "unusually for a Venezuelan movie, there is little direct social comment, and only the most oblique criticism of the wider conditions that have made this family so desperately screwed-up".

== Cast ==
- Vanessa Di Quattro
- Juliana Cuervos
- Rubén León
- Carmily Artígas
- Jonathan Pimentel

== Production ==
The film directors, twins Luis and Andrés Rodríguez, first worked in social work with children and then began making documentaries to show the conditions of many marginalized Venezuelans. After Villa del Cine announced funding for low-budget fiction films in 2011, the brothers applied and were able to tell a similar story as a drama with Breach in the Silence.

The research and writing of the film is said to have taken six months and involved the Venezuelan Association of the Deaf. The film was in pre-production for two months, and filming only took six weeks.

== Awards ==
Event	Award	Nominee(s)	Result
2012 Festival de Cine Entre Largos y Cortos de Oriente (ELCO)	Best Production Design	Darwin Angola	Won
2012 Festival de Cine Entre Largos y Cortos de Oriente (ELCO)	Best Direction	A & L Rodríguez	Won
2012 Festival de Cine Entre Largos y Cortos de Oriente (ELCO)	Best Film		Won
2012 Festival de Cine Entre Largos y Cortos de Oriente (ELCO)	Best Cinematography	Antonio Garcia	Won
2012 Festival de Cine Entre Largos y Cortos de Oriente (ELCO)	Best Advertisement	Intramovies	Won
2012 Cairo International Film Festival	Best First Film		Won
2012 Cairo International Film Festival	Best Actress	Vanessa Di Quattro	Won
2012 Cairo International Film Festival	Premio FIPRESCI		Won

== See also ==
- List of submissions to the 86th Academy Awards for Best Foreign Language Film
- List of Venezuelan submissions for the Academy Award for Best Foreign Language Film
