= Las Aventuras de Juan Planchard =

Novel by Jonathan Jakubowicz

First edition

Las Aventuras de Juan Planchard (The Adventures of Juan Planchard) is a novel by Venezuelan writer and filmmaker Jonathan Jakubowicz.

== Book ==
The book was published in November 2016 and by February 2017 became the number one Amazon Best Seller for all Foreign Language Fiction. In Venezuela the book sparked unprecedented success, not only in the record breaking sales but also in the number of public gatherings to read it. One community of fifty thousand people that define themselves as "resistance to the Maduro dictatorship (Resistencia Venezuela hasta los tuétanos)", read the book aloud every night on the encrypted frequency of the app Zello. The book is on its way to become the biggest Best Seller of all time for a Venezuelan author.

The Synopsis of the book according to Amazon is as follows: "The Adventures of Juan Planchard" (Las Aventuras de Juan Planchard) is a journey through the underbelly of the sexiest form of socialism. The Venezuelan Bolivarian Oligarchy is responsible for the biggest robbery in the history of mankind, and the lifestyle of one of their own, Juan Planchard, is irresistible to follow. Action, adventure, suspense, drama, comedy, all genres blend in a fast-paced tour de force that will surprise you until its very last words. You will not understand Hugo Chávez and his revolution until you meet Juan Planchard. And you will never forget or forgive the fun you had in the process

== Theater play adaptation ==
Venezuelan director Moisés Kaufman is set to adapt the novel to a theater play. Actors include Christian McGaffney, Elysia Roorbach, Elba Escobar, Orlando Urdaneta, Mariaca Semprún, Roberto Jaramillo, Carlos Fabián Medina, Patrick Ball, and Vicente Peña.
