= Gatchaman (OVA) =

Japanese original video animation

- Logo of Gatchaman OVA

ガッチャマン
- Genre: Adventure; Science fiction superhero
- Created by: Tatsuo Yoshida; Tatsunoko Production
- Original video animation
- Directed by: Hiroyuki Fukushima
- Written by: Artmic
- Music by: Maurice White; Bill Meyers
- Studio: Tatsunoko Production (Note: Production assistance (制作協力) for all episodes provided by Artmic and Artland.)
- Licensed by: NA: Sentai Filmworks (current) Urban Vision (former, expired)
- Released: October 1, 1994 – April 1, 1995
- Runtime: 45 minutes (each)
- Episodes: 3
- Alternative titles
- Gatchaman 94; Techno Ninja Gatchaman

Gatchaman (ガッチャマン) is a three-part original video animation (OVA) based on the anime series Science Ninja Team Gatchaman. It was released in Japan from 1994 to 1995. This version of Gatchaman is set in the year 2066, where the evil leader of the nation of Hontwall is threatening to take over the planet. Scientists from the International Science Organization are disappearing and only five teenage heroes, the Science Ninja team, can stop the disaster.

In the United States, Harmony Gold and Urban Vision released the OVA with an English dub on VHS in 1997 and DVD in 2001. The OVA was re-released on Blu-ray and DVD by Sentai Filmworks in 2013, with a new English dub that used the cast from in-house ADV Films version of the original series and 1978 movie.

== Plot ==
No.	Title	Original release date
1	"The Dragon King"; Transliteration: "Gatchaman Vs. Turtle King" (Japanese: ガッチャマン VS タートルキング)	October 1, 1994
An enormous dragon-shaped warship decimates a city with plasma beams and giant robotic arms. Its target is the Mantle Plan, a network unifying the world's energy resources. As the sinister ship heads for its next target a team of specialists rise to the rescue: the Gatchaman. Piloting their ship, the Phoenix, the Gatchaman launch a counterattack. Once inside the enemy ship they come face to face with the Galactor's entire army of assassins.
2	"The Red Specter"; Transliteration: "Secret Red Impulse" (Japanese: 謎のレッドインパルス)	January 1, 1995
The Gatchaman are in trouble and receive help from a mysterious group known as Red Impulse. While cruising near a strange island a submarine is vaporized by a large blast. Summoned to avenge the attack the Gatchaman Group comes upon the secret undersea headquarters of the alien Galactor. In a fierce air and undersea battle the Gatchaman struggle against the Galactor's Jupiter Death Brigade and the evil Black Bird Battalion, before decisively defeating them. Battered by combat, the Gatchaman appear to be on the brink of defeat when, out of the sky, a new force appears led by a mysterious warrior in red.
3	"The Final Countdown"; Transliteration: "Final Count 0002" (Japanese: ファイナルカウント0002)	April 1, 1995
The Gatchaman have to confront Solaris in a final battle to save the earth. The huge mechanical devices installed at each of the Galactor's bases are infiltrating the Earth's interior, disrupting weather patterns and transforming the Earth's landscape into an environment hostile to the human race. In the midst of these disasters Joe is beginning to regain his childhood memories and must deal with the realization that he may be descended from the blood of his enemies. Joe decides to use his knowledge of the Galactor society to help save the human race. Joe single-handedly infiltrates the Galactor headquarters and manages to transmit its coordinates to the Gatchaman moments before he is captured by Solaris and his henchman. Meanwhile, the Gatchaman group teams up with Red Impulse to attack the Galactor's home base—it is a brutal fight to the death in which both the Gatchaman and the Red Impulse will pay the ultimate price. In a post-credits scene, it turns out that the Gatchaman team survived thanks to a miracle.

== Cast ==
Character	Japanese	English	
Character	Japanese	Sky Quest Entertainment (1997)	Seraphim Digital (2013)
Narrator			George Manley
Ken the Eagle (G1)	Masaya Onosaka	Eddie Frierson David Pires (young)	Leraldo Anzaldua
Joe the Condor (G2)	Kouji Ishii	Richard Cansino	Brian Jepson
Jun the Swan (G3)	Michiko Neya	Lara Cody	Kim Prause
Jinpei the Swallow (G4)	Rica Matsumoto	Jimmy	Luci Christian
Jinpei the Swallow (G4)	Rica Matsumoto	Mona Marshall	Luci Christian
Ryu the Owl (G5)	Fumihiko Tachiki	Rocky Nakanishi	Victor Carsurd
Ryu the Owl (G5)	Fumihiko Tachiki	Richard Epcar	Victor Carsurd
Dr. Kouzaburou Nanbu	Ikuya Sawaki	Michael McConnohie	Andy McAvin
Berg Katse	Kaneto Shiozawa (male) Ai Orikasa (female)	Solaris	Edwin Neal (male) Claire Hamilton (female)
Berg Katse	Kaneto Shiozawa (male) Ai Orikasa (female)	R. Martin Klein	Edwin Neal (male) Claire Hamilton (female)
Leader X	Nobuo Tanaka	Lord Zortek	Charles Campbell
Leader X	Nobuo Tanaka	Ralph Votrian	Charles Campbell
Kentarou Washio	Unshou Ishidzuka	Bob Papenbrook	John Tyson
Director Anderson	Yonehiko Kitagawa	Michael Forest	Marty Fleck
President Kerry Beoluke	Shigezou Sasaoka	Jeff Winkless	Mark Laskowski
Dr. Kirkland	Masaharu Satou	Clifton Wells	Lowell Bartholomee
Dr. Kessler	Takehito Koyasu	Kirk Thornton	Leraldo Anzaldua
Blackbirds	Shin'ichirou Miki		

In 1997, Harmony Gold released the series with a dub recorded by co-publisher Urban Vision, with its former in-house dub producer Sky Quest Entertainment. This dub changed a few character names, but kept an overall faithful plot otherwise. This version was released on VHS and DVD, before Harmony Gold's license expired.

In 2013, Sentai Filmworks, licensed and redubbed the series using ADV in-house dub producer Seraphim Digital. This dub keeps the original Japanese names, and uses the cast from Sentai's uncut redub of the original show and the 1978 movie.

== Design ==
In the OVA series, the characters' designs and ages were changed along with other elements as part of the process of "updating" the series for modern audiences. Ken, who had long hair in the original series, was given short hair. Joe was redesigned with more of a "bad boy" image, given a tattoo and made a smoker. His car was also updated to a Shelby Cobra. Jun originally had long green hair but has short brown hair in the OVA, has developed physically and has worked as a model in the past. Jinpei is renamed as Jimmy and given more of a "street kid" look while his position on the team becomes "hacker". Ryu is now the oldest at 25, he was originally 17, and his hairstyle is changed to a blonde-and-purple mohawk. The GodPhoenix was also redesigned and appears to be larger than the original. The Red Impulse squadron had only three members in the original series while in the OVA continuity there are more.

== Music ==
The film's soundtrack was composed and produced by Maurice White and Bill Meyers, with additional music by Bob Sakuma from the original TV series. The ending theme "Let's Fly" was performed by Lance Matthew.
