= One Life and Two Trails =

1997 film

- Film poster
- Directed by: Alberto Arvelo
- Written by: Alberto Arvelo
- Starring: Germán Mendieta
- Release date: 1997
- Running time: 100 minutes
- Country: Venezuela
- Language: Spanish

One Life and Two Trails (Spanish: Una vida y dos mandados) is a 1997 Venezuelan drama film directed by Alberto Arvelo. The film was selected as the Venezuelan entry for the Best Foreign Language Film at the 70th Academy Awards, but was not accepted as a nominee.

== Cast ==
- Germán Mendieta as Romer del Gado
- Ramona Pérez as Ninfa del Gado

== Plot ==
Romer (German Mendieta) is a successful architect in Caracas as the story opens. It has presumably been years since he visited his mother, Ninfa (Ramona Perez), in the Andean section of the country. When he receives an old family photo in the mail, he becomes consumed with the disquieting sense of her imminent death. As he travels back to his birthplace, Romer’s story unfolds. A bright youngster, he’s selected to attend a seminary and possibly enter the priesthood. Instead, he winds up in the streets of Mérida, first selling produce and later as part of a band of touring players. In Caracas, he lands a job washing dishes until the opportunity arises to teach school in a remote farming community.

== See also ==
- List of submissions to the 70th Academy Awards for Best Foreign Language Film
- List of Venezuelan submissions for the Academy Award for Best Foreign Language Film
