= Joseph Novoa =

Venezuelan filmmaker (born 1959)

- Born: José Ramón Novoa; August 22, 1959 (age 67); Montevideo, Uruguay
- Citizenship: Uruguay; Venezuela; United States
- Occupations: Film director; producer; writer
- Years active: 1985–present
- Spouse: Elia Schneider (m. 1979–2020)

José Ramón Novoa (born 22 August 1959), better known as Joseph Novoa or José R. Novoa (Spanish pronunciation: [ˈdʒoʊzəf noʊˈvoʊə]), is a Uruguayan-born filmmaker and executive producer. He is married to the director and scriptwriter Elia Schneider and is the father of the film director Joel Novoa.

== Biography ==
Joseph Novoa was born in Montevideo, Uruguay on August 22, 1954. He studied architecture in Uruguay but his real path was the arts. He started his entertainment career at El Teatro Circular of Uruguay. Following his dream, he moved to Paris to study Performance Arts in the L'École Internationale de Théâtre Jacques Lecoq. In Paris, he founded the theatre group El Circo and organized and performed different plays. He got a scholarship from the Danish Government to work with Eugenio Barba Directing Te Odin Teatret (Holstebro, Denmark). He lived in Europe for a few years, where he Directed and Produced plays that were presented in Theater Festivals like Festival d'Avignon and Festival Nancy. Some of the plays were "The night of the Assassins", "Masks" and "The Exile of the Sun".

In Venezuela, he became the Associate Director of the International Theater Festival (Theatre of Nations – UNESCO) in 1978 and 1982. He received the Critven Award (Critic's Prize for best lighting) for the play "Gaz". He studied film at the New York University and Television at the New School of Arts.

As a film director, he released his debut long feature "Agony" in 1984 at the Montreal Film Festival and the Indian Film Festival. His movie "Assassins for Hire" (Sicario) was released in 1994 and was in theaters for 35 weeks becoming one of the bigger blockbusters in Venezuela. It received 27 awards from international film festivals and was the official selection from Venezuela to the Oscars in 1995.

His third movie, "Devil's Gold" (Oro Diablo, 1999), was another blockbuster in Venezuela and won 3 international awards, becoming the official selection for the Oscars on Venezuela's behalf. "The Boss" (2006) and "A Distant Place" (2009) received good critics from national and international press. A distant Place went to different festivals in Europe, America and Asia. This is the only Venezuelan movie shot with Panavision cameras in cinemascope 35mm. "Alone" (2014) was his sixth movie as a Director.

He worked as a Producer in some Venezuelan feature films: Glue Sniffer (1999), Step Forward (Punto y Raya, 2004), Un-Authorized (2009), God's Slave (2013) and Tamara that is going to be released this 2015. Internationally he produced In This Tricky Life (Uruguay, 2001), Be Happy (Chile, 2004), Encarnacion (Argentina, 2007), Polvo Nuestro Que Estas en los Cielos (Argentina, 2008), El Premio (Peru, 2009), Verdades Verdaderas La Vida de Estela (Argentina, 2011) y Cuchillos en el Cielo (Peru, 2013).

His films have been featured in more than 100 international film festivals and have received over 80 significant awards. The most recent was the SEGIB Award by Ibermedia for his latest production, Tamara.

He is member by invitation of the Spanish Academy of Arts and Cinematographic Sciences (Goya Awards). He was the founder and first VP of the Board of Trustees of the Iberoamerican Federation of Cinematographers (FIPCA), president of the Federation of Film Producers in Venezuela (CAVEPROL) and a member of the board of National Autonomous Center of Film in Venezuela (CNAC).

He moved to Los Angeles, California and from there he is developing new projects using English as his primary language. Some of his projects are the featured films Bullet Lullaby and Pando, the documentary Music and Action and a TV Show. As producer, he is working in the movie "Unfit" directed by Elia K. Schneider.

== Filmography ==
Directed features
Year	Title	Distributor
1985	Agony	
1994	Sicario	Joel Films
2000	Devil's Gold	Garimpeiros
2006	El Don	
2009	Un lugar lejano	
2004	Alone	TLA Releasing

=== Feature films ===
- Tamara (2015 | Producer-Editor)
- Alone (Solo, 2014 | Producer-Director)
- God's Slave (Esclavo de Dios, 2013 | Producer)
- A Distant Place (Un Lugar Lejano, 2009 | Producer-Director)
- An-Authorized (Des-Autorizados, 2007 | Producer)
- The Boss (El Don, 2006 | Producer-Director)
- Step Forward (Punto y Raya, 2004 | Producer) OSCAR-Academy Awards Entry- Best Foreign Film
- Devil Gold (Oro Diablo – Garimpeiros, 2000 | Producer-Director-) OSCAR-Academy Awards Entry- Best Foreign Film
- Glue Sniffer (Huelepega, 1999 | Producer-Editor) OSCAR-Academy Awards Entry- Best Foreign Film
- Assassin's for Hire (Sicario, 1994 | Producer-Director-Editor) OSCAR-Academy Awards Entry- Best Foreign Film
- Agony (Agonia, 1985 | Writer-Producer-Director-Editor)

=== Short films ===
- Borrowed Lands (Tierras Prestadas. 1981 | Producer-Editor)
- Pedro Navaja (1980 | Writer-Producer-Director-Editor)
- The Big World (El Gran Mundo, 1979 | Writer-Producer-Director-Editor)

=== International coproductions ===
- El Premio (2009) Directed by Alberto Chicho Durant, Peru.
- Encarnación (2007) Directed by Anahi Berneri, Argentina.
- Be Happy (2004) Directed by Gonzalo Justiniano, Chile.
- In This Tricky Life (En la Puta Vida, 2002) Directed by Beatriz Flores Silva, Uruguay.
- Knives in the Sky (Cuchillos en el cielo) Directed by Alberto Chicho Durant, Peru.
- Estela Directed by Nicolás Gil Lavedra, Argentina.
- Masangeles (Polvo nuestro que estás en el cielo) Directed by Beatriz Flores Silva, Uruguay.

== Awards ==
Movie	Award	Festival
Sicario	Best Film	Biarritz Film Festival
Sicario	Best Film	Philadelphia Film Festival
Sicario	Best Film	Fort Lauderdale International Film Festival
Sicario	Best Actress	Tokyo International Film Festival
Sicario	Best Film	Festival de Cine Iberoamericano de Huelva
Sicario	Best Jury Award	Trieste Film Festival
Sicario	Best Editor	Caracas Film Festival
Glue Sniffer	Best Producer	Caracas Film Festival
Glue Sniffer	Best Photography	Gava
Glue Sniffer	Best Film Human Rights	Buenos Aires International Festival of Independent Cinema
Glue Sniffer	Best Film	Vitoria Film Festival
Punto y Raya	Best Actor	Festival de Gramado
Punto y Raya	Best Actor	Havana Film Festival
Punto y Raya	Best Jury Award	Festival de Gramado
Huelepega	Special Selection	Busan International Film Festival
Punto y Raya	Best Film	Los Angeles Film Festival
Punto y Raya	Best Film	San Francisco International Film Festival
Punto y Raya	Best Film	Festival de Cine Iberoamericano de Huelva
Punto y Raya	Presentation	Golden Globes
Punto y Raya	Best Film	Festival de Brasília
Punto y Raya	Best Actor	Festival de Merida
Sicario	Best Jury Award	Festival de Cine de Lima
Punto y Raya	Critics Award	Festival de Gramado
Sicario	Best Film	Best Municipal Award
Sicario	Finalist	Goya Awards
Sicario	Best Screenplay	Havana Film Festival
Sicario	Best Film	Santa Barbara International Film Festival
Sicario	Best Director	Tokyo International Film Festival
Sicario	Best Director	Viña del Mar International Film Festival
	Best Film	Caracas Film Festival
	Best Director	Caracas Film Festival
	Best Jury Award	Festival de Gramado
Punto y Raya	Best Actor	Havana Film Festival
Sicario	Best Actor	Biarritz Film Festival
Sicario	Best Editor	Festival de Gramado
Oro Diablo	Best Photography	Santa Cruz Film Festival
Huelepega	Best Film	New York International Latino Film Festival
Huelepega	Best Film	Sant Feliu Guixols
Huelepega	Best Photography	Caracas Film Festival
Punto y Raya	Best Actor	Caracas Film Festival
Punto y Raya	Best Film Decade	MoMa
Sicario	Best Actor	Fort Lauderdale International Film Festival
Punto y Raya	Best Director	Bogota International Film Festival
Sicario	Best Film	Montreal LAtino Film Festival
Sicario	Best Film	São Paulo International Film Festival
Punto y Raya	Best Jury Award	Santa Barbara International Film Festival
Punto y Raya	Best Jury Award	Festival do Rio
Punto y Raya	Best Edition	Merida Film Festival
Punto y Raya	Best Director	Merida Film Festival
Punto y Raya	Best Actor	Festival de Cine Global Dominicano
Sicario	Best Screenplay	Santa Cruz Film Festival
	Tatu Tumpa Award Excellence of Iberoamerican Producer	Bolivia Film Festival
	Nominated Platinum Awards	Egeda – Fipca

== See also ==
- List of Venezuelan films
