= Punto y raya =

2004 film

- Film poster
- Directed by: Elia Schneider
- Written by: Henry Herrera
- Starring: Roque Valero; Edgar Ramírez; Ramiro Meneses
- Release date: 2004
- Running time: 105 minutes
- Country: Venezuela
- Language: Spanish

Punto y raya (English: Step Forward) is a 2004 Venezuelan political satire black comedy film directed by Elia Schneider. It was Venezuela's submission to the 77th Academy Awards for the Academy Award for Best Foreign Language Film, but failed to receive a nomination.

== Cast ==
- Edgar Ramirez as Pedro
- Roque Valero as cheito
- Daniela Alvarado as Yosmar
- Dora Mazzone as Ana Maria
- Daniela Bascope as Lucrecia
- Pedro Lander as Capitan
- Laureano Olivares as Carrasco
- Rafael Uribe as Colombian capitan
- Juan David Restrepo as Sargento Requena
- Yugui Lopez as narco

== Critics ==
Rotten Tomatoes website as 79% of approbation

== See also ==
- List of submissions to the 77th Academy Awards for Best Foreign Language Film
- Oro diablo
- Desautorizado
