= Frank Langdon =

Fictional character from The Pitt

- The Pitt character
- First appearance: "7:00 A.M." (2025)
- Created by: R. Scott Gemmill
- Portrayed by: Patrick Ball

In-universe information
- Full name: Frank Langdon
- Occupation: Fourth-year resident physician (season 1-2)

Frank Langdon is a fictional character from the HBO Max medical procedural drama series The Pitt, portrayed by American actor Patrick Ball. The character was introduced in "7:00 A.M.", the show's pilot episode, as a senior emergency medicine resident at Pittsburgh Trauma Medical Center, as the quick-witted "golden boy", Michael Robinavitch's protegé, and the 'heir apparent' to the emergency department, colloquially referred to as the Pitt. During the first season, his reputation is ruined when it is revealed he is struggling with drug addiction and has been using his status to steal benzodiazepines and other controlled substances from the hospital's supply.

The character, and Ball's performance, have received acclaim from critics, with Ball receiving multiple award nominations.

== Fictional character biography ==
=== Pre-Season 1 ===
Langdon grew up outside of Pittsburgh but had relatives who lived in the city. Every time he would visit, his mother would take him to the Fort Pitt Museum. He is married to Abby Langdon, who he shares two children with, a son named Tanner and a daughter named Penny.

At some point before the first season begins, Langdon suffered a severe back injury while trying to help his parents move, which led to him being prescribed muscle relaxants and pain medications. In an attempt to wean himself off, he began self-medicating using benzodiazepines (specifically Librium) from the hospital.

=== Season 1 ===
In the first season, Langdon is initially depicted as a confident fourth-year resident and the right-hand man to senior attending physician Dr. Michael "Robby" Robinavitch (Noah Wyle). Despite his high competence and charismatic demeanor, which earns him the nickname "ER Ken" from surgical resident Dr. Yolanda Garcia (Alexandra Metz). Langdon harbors deep personal demons. He frequently clashes with ambitious intern Dr. Trinity Santos (Isa Briones) over differing medical philosophies and approaches to patient care.

As the season progresses, Santos becomes suspicious of irregularities regarding patient medications. In "4:00 P.M.", Langdon's theft and active addiction is revealed. When confronted by a furious and betrayed Robby, who discovers missing medication in his locker, Langdon defends his actions by revealing his injury, and insists he's neither intoxicated nor an addict. Unmoved, Robby immediately fires him and sends him home. Despite his termination, Langdon returns two episodes later in "6:00 P.M." to assist the overwhelmed staff during a mass casualty shooting at a local music festival.

=== Season 2 ===
Ten months later, Langdon returns to the Pitt to repeat his fourth-year of residency during the first episode after completing a stint in rehabilitation. He begins an 'amends tour' and attempts to make up for his actions during the first season, including apologising and confessing to regular patient Louie Cloverfield about stealing his Librium, but he is still kept at a distance by Santos, and Robby, who claims he's unsure if he wants Langdon working in his ER and places him in triage, knocking his confidence. However, he finds allies in third-year resident Dr. Melissa "Mel" King (Taylor Dearden) and charge nurse Dana Evans (Katherine LaNasa), who both forgive him and offer support.

In "12:00 P.M.", Cloverfield is found unresponsive and Langdon works jointly with Robby to resuscitate him, but attempts fail and Cloverfield subsequently dies. Langdon's confidence returns after Robby encourages him to perform a surgical procedure when no neurosurgeons are available. Langdon discovers Robby's suicidal ideation and encourages him to seek help. Robby listens and accepts his advice, however, they do not fully reconcile before Robby leaves for sabbatical.

== Development ==
=== Casting ===
The character of Frank Langdon was created by series showrunner R. Scott Gemmill and executive producers John Wells and Noah Wyle. Ball's casting was announced on July 12, 2024, alongside the announcement of eight other cast members. It was Ball's first major onscreen role. During Variety's 2026 Actors on Actors feature, he claimed he had a "series of panic attacks" after being cast.

=== Characterization ===
To prepare for the role's addiction storyline, Ball drew inspiration from his personal history of drug use, his family's background in healthcare, and spoke to many real-life doctors and nurses about prevalence of substance abuse among healthcare professionals, to create an authentic, humane portrayal of dependence and the early stages of sobriety.

== Reception ==
The character and Ball's performance have been praised by critics for subverting typical television tropes associated with drug addiction.

IGN noted the "impressive" nature of Ball's differing portrayals of Langdon between the first and second seasons, regarding as one of the 'especially strong performances' in season 2's "1:00 P.M." SlashFilm said it's a "credit to Ball's sympathetic performance" that viewers remain hopeful for Langdon. Ryan Schwartz from TVLine said Ball "brought palpable weight" and "never overplayed" Langdon's return, which resulted in a performance that "made every triumph feel fragile, every setback feel consequential, and every step forward feel earned".

== Awards and nominations ==
For his portrayal of Langdon, Ball received a nomination at the 31st Critics' Choice Awards for Best Supporting Actor in a Drama Series. He also won a Screen Actors Guild Award for Outstanding Performance by an Ensemble in a Drama Series at the 32nd Actor Awards alongside the rest of the cast. He received a nomination for Outstanding Supporting Actor in a Drama Series at the 78th Primetime Emmy Awards.
