= Un lugar lejano =

- Film poster
- Directed by: José Ramón Novoa
- Screenplay by: Fernando Buttozini
- Story by: Fernando Buttozini
- Produced by: Jose Ramon Novoa, Elia Scheneider
- Starring: Erich Wildpret, Tristan Ulloa
- Release date: 2009
- Countries: Venezuela; Argentina; Spain
- Language: Spanish

Un lugar lejano (also titled En un lugar lejano) is a 2009 film directed by Uruguayan filmmaker José Ramón Novoa, with an original screenplay by writer Fernando Butazzoni and starring Erich Wildpret, Mirela Mendoza, Tristán Ulloa, Alberto Alifa, Elba Escobar, and Marcela Kloosterboer. It was a finalist for the Screenplay Award at the Havana International Film Festival. The film was released on 20 April 2010 in Spain.

In 2020 the movie have a streaming release on the streaming platform Cine ar play.

== Production ==
It was a co-production between three countries: Venezuela (Joel Films), Argentina (Aleph Media), and Spain (Avalon Productions). Adolfo López Producciones also participated as the national co-producer for Venezuela.

Filming of Un lugar lejano began on 16 July 2007 in Venezuela. From 20 August, it continued in southern Patagonia, Argentina, and later in several locations in Galicia, Spain.

Panavision partnered with the project, providing the cameras and other equipment needed for production. The equipment arrived from Los Angeles, and the film was shot in Super 35 mm in widescreen format (2.40 x 1).

== Plot ==
The film tells the story of Julián (played by actor Erich Wildpret) in an almost intimate tone. Julián is a famous photographer who has reached the age of forty, tired and abandoned to his own sadness and loneliness. Julián is diagnosed with cancer, which saps his strength and robs him of all hope. But he has a dream, a vision that will change his life: he dreams of a photo he has never taken. He then travels to that faraway place to search for the photo, and after a strange accident, he meets a woman (Marcela Kloosterboer). Suddenly, he discovers that his life will change forever.

== Cast ==
- Erich Wildpret...Julián
- Mirela Mendoza ...Lisa
- Tristán Ulloa ...Roque
- Alberto Alifa as doctor
- Marcela Kloosterboer...María
- Paul Gámez
- Rosalinda Serfaty as galerist
- Basilio Alvarez as librery man

== Reception ==
Pablo Abraham commented about the film:

Julián (a convincing Erich Wildpret) is our protagonist. We see him in Caracas, where the film narrates his progressive physical and moral decline due not only to the advance of his illness but also to his loneliness and lack of hope. But once he identifies the location of the photo he dreams of (...Manchuria, in Argentine Patagonia), he embarks on a long journey as a last gasp before his imminent death. And there begins...the most interesting part of the film...although the theme is very hackneyed, as contact with a lonely young peasant girl from the area (Marcela Klooterboerg, a remarkable revelation) will rekindle Julián's passion and joy for life. Novoa makes this part of the story work very naturally, without exaggerating the situations and maintaining the leisurely, though not slow, pace of what he is telling... What comes next destroys the charm and leaves the viewer somewhat confused... because... it challenges them to continue believing the story by offering him a miraculous cure for his illness... and the protagonist's final decision to abandon his own world, losing himself in [...] Patagonia, searching for that other world he dreamed or imagined in his delirium, and which helped him recover. The objective fails because throughout the film...the obsession with the dream photo is cloaked in the protagonist's possible existential transcendence... While it is true that the character evolves (the first shot of the film shows him prostrate and distressed, in the last one he walks away... walking happily through Patagonia), and it is acceptable that doubts about what he experienced or dreamed remain unresolved, this supposed transcendence is completely diluted, giving way to a certain “triviality,” or rather, a certain aspect of the protagonist's inner emptiness that not even the author seems to have noticed. In view of this, we cannot help but think, then, that the reasons for Julián's dream to undertake the journey can be considered a manifestation of the mental imbalance of a man on the verge of death... a lunatic who has never known what he wants in life.

Abraham continued:

José Ramón Novoa's work has been one of the few that has managed to attract audiences that Venezuelan cinema had been losing since the 1990s. Proof of this can be found in the success of Sicario (1994), Garimpeiros (2000, known internationally as Black Gold), and El Don (2006), films that unashamedly displayed a taste for marginal themes and characters, protagonists of dramas in the best style of what has come to be known as Latin American verismo: the neighborhood, poverty, juvenile delinquency, lawlessness, survival in a violent world... Novoa has also produced equally successful films such as Huelepega, la ley de la calle (1999) and Punto y raya (2004), both directed by his wife Elia Schneider.
