= Laureano Olivares =

Venezuelan actor (born 1978)

- Born: 16 September 1978 (age 47); Caracas, Venezuela
- Occupation: Actor
- Years active: 1992—present

Laureano Olivares (born 16 September 1978) is a Venezuelan actor best known for his role in Elia Schneider's movie Sicario at the age of 16.

== Filmography ==
=== Films ===
- Sicario (1994)
- Huelepega: Ley de la Calle (1999)
- Oro Diablo (2000)
- El Don (2002)
- Punto y Raya (2004)
- El Caracazo (2005)
- Postales de Leningrado (2007)
- The Zero Hour (2010)
- El Rumor de las Piedras (2011)
- Esclavo de Dios (2013)
- The Return (2013)
- Solo (2014)
- Las Caras del Diablo 2 (2014)
- Muerte Suspendida (2015)
- Tamara (2016)
- Death In Berruecos ( 2018)

=== Telenovelas ===
- Ciudad Bendita (Venevisión, 2006)
- Arroz con Leche (Venevision, 2007)
- ¿Vieja Yo? (Venevision, 2008)
- Tomasa Tequiero (Venevision, 2009)
- La mujer perfecta (Venevisión, 2010)
- Las Bandidas (Televen 2013)
- Virgen de la Calle (RTI, RCTV, Televisa 2013)
- Piel Salvaje (RCTV, 2015)
- Para Verte Mejor (Venevision, 2017)
