= Once Upon a Time in Venezuela =

2020 film

- Theatrical release poster
- Directed by: Anabel Rodríguez Ríos
- Written by: Anabel Rodríguez Ríos
- Cinematography: John Márquez
- Music by: Nascuy Linares
- Production companies: Sancocho Público; Spiraleye Productions; Golden Girls Filmproduktion; TRES Cinematografía
- Release date: 27 January 2020 (Sundance)
- Running time: 99 minutes
- Countries: Venezuela; United Kingdom; Brazil; Austria
- Language: Spanish

Once Upon a Time in Venezuela (Spanish: Érase una vez en Venezuela, Congo Mirador) is a 2020 documentary film written and directed by Anabel Rodríguez Ríos. It was selected as the Venezuelan entry for the Best International Feature Film at the 93rd Academy Awards, but it was not nominated.

== Synopsis ==
Villagers around Lake Maracaibo deal with corruption and pollution which threatens their homes.

== See also ==
- List of submissions to the 93rd Academy Awards for Best International Feature Film
- List of Venezuelan submissions for the Academy Award for Best International Feature Film
