= The Rumble of the Stones =

2011 film

- Film poster
- Directed by: Alejandro Bellame Palacios
- Written by: Valentina Saa; Alejandro Bellame Palacios
- Produced by: José Ernesto Martínez
- Starring: Rossana Fernández Díaz
- Cinematography: Alexandra Henao
- Release date: 6 June 2011
- Running time: 100 minutes
- Country: Venezuela
- Language: Spanish

The Rumble of the Stones (Spanish: El rumor de las piedras) is a 2011 Venezuelan drama film directed by Alejandro Bellame Palacios. The film was selected as the Venezuelan entry for the Best Foreign Language Film at the 84th Academy Awards, but it did not reach the final shortlist.

== Cast ==
- Rossana Fernández Díaz as Delia
- Cristian González as William
- Juan Carlos Nuñez as Santiago
- Aminta de Lara as Raiza
- Alberto Alifa as David
- Veronica Arellano as Chela
- Arlette Torres as Marisol
- Laureano Olivares as El Fauna
- Zapata 666 as El Mota
- Yonaikel Burguillos as Yeyson

== See also ==
- List of submissions to the 84th Academy Awards for Best Foreign Language Film
- List of Venezuelan submissions for the Academy Award for Best Foreign Language Film
