= Arcel =

Arcel is a surname. Notable people with the surname include:

- Ray Arcel (1899–1994), American boxing trainer
- Nastja Arcel (born 1963), Danish actress
- Nikolaj Arcel (born 1972), Danish director and screenwriter
