= Hands of Stone =

- Theatrical release poster
- Directed by: Jonathan Jakubowicz
- Written by: Jonathan Jakubowicz
- Produced by: Jay Weisleder; Carlos García de Paredes; Claudine Jakubowicz; Jonathan Jakubowicz
- Starring: Édgar Ramírez; Robert De Niro; Usher
- Cinematography: Miguel Ioann Littin
- Edited by: Ethan Maniquis
- Music by: Angelo Milli
- Production companies: Fuego Films; Vertical Media; Panama Film Commission; Epicentral Studios
- Distributed by: The Weinstein Company
- Release dates: May 16, 2016 (Cannes); August 26, 2016 (United States)
- Running time: 111 minutes
- Countries: United States; Panama
- Languages: English; Spanish
- Budget: $20 million
- Box office: $5 million

Hands of Stone is a 2016 biographical sports film about the career of Panamanian former professional boxer Roberto Durán. It is directed and written by Jonathan Jakubowicz. It stars Édgar Ramírez, Robert De Niro, Usher, Ruben Blades, Pedro "Budu" Pérez, Ellen Barkin, Ana de Armas, Oscar Jaenada and John Turturro. The film premiered at Cannes on May 16, 2016 and was released on August 26, 2016, by The Weinstein Company.

== Plot ==
Growing up in Panama, Durán is homeschooled by Chaflan, who teaches young Roberto some vital life lessons. Later, Duran joins a boxing club with Nestor "Plomo" Quiñones as his coach.

As he reaches 20, an American legendary boxing trainer Ray Arcel, who nearly lost his life after being attacked by an assailant sent by the mobster, Frankie Carbo in 1953 in New York City and is now living with his wife Stephanie, notices Roberto's raw talent and punching power and takes the young fighter under his wing, becoming his coach. Not long after, Durán meets Felicidad, a student, with whom he later has five children.

After his fights through the 70s and 80s, rising through the divisions with phenomenal success (just one loss) he challenges Sugar Ray Leonard, dubbed as the "Fighter of the Year." However, Durán is disrespectful to Leonard, describing him as a "clown" and confidently predicts a knockout win for himself.

One night, Durán insults Leonard in front of his wife by calling him a "homosexual". The incident angers Leonard. Durán's hard feelings for Leonard seem to stem from his resentment of Americans in general, because he recalls the ill-treatment meted out by the Americans to the nation of Panama, remembering how American troops took over the country by owning the Panama Canal—leading to conflict between the sides in 1964.

In June 1980 in Montreal, the day of the fight between Durán and Leonard, Durán wins the welterweight championship via unanimous decision (148–147, 145–144, 146–144). After the fight, Leonard states that being insulted is a strategy and calls for a rematch with an $8 million purse. At the house party, Durán is made aware of Leonard's challenge by his manager Carlos Eleta, but he was intoxicated and reluctantly agrees to the rematch. Duran, while drunk curses at Chaflan for jumping into the pool, splashing water over him and kicks Chaflan out. Now living on the streets, Chaflan resorts to stealing food to survive. He is killed after being struck by a truck one night while running away after he stole food.

In November 1980, Durán and Leonard face in the ring for the second time, this time the venue is in New Orleans. But in the eighth round, Durán gives up by saying "No más" (English: "No more") to the referee, angering the entire Panamanian community, thus Leonard wins via technical knockout (68–66, 68–66, and 67–66).

Upon returning home to Panama, he faces angry protests. Durán tells his wife that he regrets letting them down and needs to go back in the ring in order to regain his popularity and the forgiveness of his fans. Due to this incident, Arcel is retired from his training and tells Durán that Plomo will be his coach. In June 1983, New York City, the day of his fight against Davey Moore, Leonard gratefully meets Durán for the first time since the rematch, saying that he forgives Durán. He tells Leonard that he gives his apology to his wife. As the fight with Moore goes up to the eighth round, in which Leonard is the commentator, Durán wins the fight via technical knockout and eventually restores his popularity and dignity with the people of Panama.

In the film's epilogue, it states that Plomo was at Durán's side for every fight until Plomo's death in 2012; Leonard and Durán remained friends; Ray Arcel was the first boxing trainer to be inducted into both the World Boxing Hall of Fame (WBHF) and the International Boxing Hall of Fame (IBHF). He died on March 7, 1994, at the age of 94 after a six-year battle with leukemia.

== Cast ==
- Édgar Ramírez as Roberto "Hands of Stone" Durán
- Robert De Niro as Ray Arcel
- Usher as "Sugar" Ray Leonard Credited as "Usher Raymond IV".
- Oscar Jaenada as Chaflan
- Jurnee Smollett-Bell as Juanita Leonard
- Ellen Barkin as Stephanie Arcel
- Rubén Blades as Carlos Eleta
- Pedro Pérez as Plomo Quiñones
- Ana de Armas as Felicidad Iglesias
- John Turturro as Frankie Carbo
- Eliud Kauffman as Margarito Duran
- John Duddy as Ken Buchanan
- Joe Urla as Angelo Dundee
- Reg E. Cathey as Don King (Uncredited)

== Production ==
Production on the film began in December 2013 in Panama. Principal photography was completed in March 2014. The film was dedicated in memory of Stephanie Arcel "your legacy is love".

== Release ==
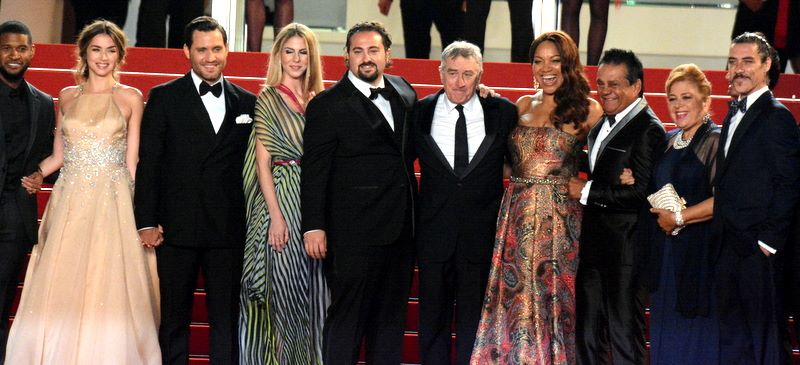
Cast and crew, with the real Roberto Durán, before the film's screening at the 2016 Cannes Film Festival.

In May 2015, The Weinstein Company acquired distribution rights to the film, with a 2,000 screen commitment. The film was scheduled to be released on August 26, 2016 in 800 theaters before expanding to 2,500 theaters on Wednesday August 31.

== Reception ==
=== Box office ===
Hands of Stone was released on August 26, 2016 and was projected to gross around $2–3 million from 810 theaters in its opening weekend. In its limited opening weekend the film grossed $1.7 million, finishing 16th at the box office. In its second weekend, despite being added to 1,201 theaters, the film grossed just $1.3 million, finishing 20th at the box office.

=== Critical response ===
On Rotten Tomatoes, the film has an approval rating of 44% based on 106 reviews, with an average rating of 5.34/10. The website's critics consensus reads: "Hands of Stone's strong cast and fascinating real-life story aren't enough to compensate for a crowded narrative and formulaic script." On Metacritic, the film has a weighted average score of 54 out of 100, based on 31 critic reviews, indicating "mixed or average" reviews. Audiences polled by CinemaScore gave the film an average grade of "A" on an A+ to F scale.

Owen Gleiberman of Variety magazine wrote: "Gets the job done, but it's hard to escape the feeling that you're watching a routinely conceived, rather generic boxing flick. It's utterly competent, yet it makes Duran's story seem a little so-what?"

== See also ==
- List of boxing films
