= The Night of the Two Moons =

- Theatrical release poster
- Directed by: Miguel Ferrari
- Release date: 2019
- Country: Venezuela
- Language: Spanish

The Night of the Two Moons (Spanish: La noche de las dos lunas) is a 2019 Venezuelan film co-written and directed by Miguel Ferrari, his second feature film six years after Azul y no tan rosa was released.

== Plot ==
In her third month of pregnancy, Federica discovers that the baby she is expecting does not have her DNA. When she goes to the clinic where her in vitro fertilization treatment was performed, she admits to having made a mistake by exchanging her embryo with another couple's. The clinic identifies the woman whose embryo was implanted, but she suffered a miscarriage. Federica decides to continue with her pregnancy and keep the baby, but the biological parents will engage in a battle to get the baby back.

== Cast ==
- Prakriti Maduro ... Federica Marín
- Mariaca Semprún ... Fabiola / wife
- Luis Gerónimo Abreu ... Alonso / husband
- María Barranco ... Eva
- Albi De Abreu ... Ubaldo Garrido
- Juan Jesús Valverde ... Vázquez
- María Cristina Lozada ... Corina
- Orlando Delgado as Mario
- Maria Barranco as Eva
- Hector Manrique as Mendiizabal
- Socrates Serrano as Joaquin

== Production ==
The director uses colors or the composition of the shots to describe the mental state of his characters (white daisies in a blue vase versus the same blue flowers of the two mothers) or uses their bodies in an expressive and always original way, feminine or masculine, exposed as an offering, generous or reproachful (squatting), blurred (the steam in the shower before the transparency of the pool) until the moment of the birth of the baby.

== Awards and nominations ==
It was premiered at the 2018 Montreal International Film Festival, where it was nominated for Grand Prix des Amériques for Best Film, then went on to the Feferencias Malaga and won Best Cinematography at the Venezuelan Film Festival. It was nominated for a Goya Award for best original song.
