= The Shadow of the Sun (film) =

- Promotional release poster
- Directed by: Miguel Ángel Ferrer
- Written by: Miguel Ángel Ferrer; Guillermo de la Rosa
- Produced by: Miguel Ángel Ferrer; Maritza Carbajal; Álvar Carretero de la Fuente; Hector Manrique Diguida; María Alejandra Guerrero Rocca; Wil Romero
- Starring: Carlos Manuel González; Anyelo López; Greisy Mena; Jeizer Ruiz; Richard Clark; David Olaves; Camila Curtis; Pedro Alonso
- Cinematography: Jose Duque
- Edited by: Miguel Ángel Ferrer
- Music by: Sandro Morales Santoro
- Production companies: Magic Films; Multi Studios
- Release dates: June 4, 2023 (LALIFF); October 5, 2023 (Caracas)
- Running time: 98 minutes
- Countries: Venezuela; United States
- Languages: Spanish; Venezuelan Sign Language

The Shadow of the Sun (Spanish: La sombra del sol) is a 2023 drama film directed, co-produced and edited by Miguel Ángel Ferrer who co-wrote with Guillermo de la Rosa. It stars Carlos Manuel González, Anyelo López, Greisy Mena, Jeizer Ruiz, Richard Clark, David Olaves, Camila Curtis and Pedro Alonso. It is about two brothers, one of whom is deaf, who sign up for a musical contest where the deaf brother will be able to fulfill his dream through his brother's voice.

It was selected as the Venezuelan entry for the Best International Feature Film at the 96th Academy Awards.

== Synopsis ==
Alex is a young deaf man who asks Leo, his older brother, to accompany him in a musical competition. Through his brother's voice, Alex will have the possibility of fulfilling his dream, although it will be a challenge that will test his skills, his capacity for perseverance and resilience in a society not suitable for inclusion.

== Cast ==
- Carlos Manuel González as Leo
  - Kenny Montoya as Young Leo
- Anyelo López as Alex
- Greisy Mena as Yolanda
- Jeizer Ruiz as Brayian
- Richard Clark as Bimbin
- David Olaves as Lucky
- Camila Curtis as Tita
- Pedro Alonso

== Production ==
Principal photography took place in Caracas and Acarigua, Venezuela, in 2022.

== Release ==
The Shadow of the Sun had its world premiere on June 4, 2023, at the 22nd Los Angeles Latino International Film Festival, then screened on July 10, 2023, at the 19th Venezuelan Film Festival, on September 23, 2023, at the 12th Georgia Latino International Film Festival and at the beginning of October at the 19th Monterrey Film Festival.

It had a limited theatrical release on October 5, 2023, in Venezuelan theaters, and then have a wider theatrical release in December of the same year.

== Reception ==
After its debut at LALIFF, The Shadow of the Sun won five awards at the Venezuelan Film Festival in Mérida, along with two additional awards at the Georgia Latino Film Festival. The film was recognized as the Best Latin American feature at the Festival Internacional de Cine de Monterrey.

The film was selected as the Venezuelan entry for the Best International Feature Film at the 96th Academy Awards. Diego Vicentini, director of the film Simón released the same year, stated that he was disappointed that his film was not chosen, arguing that Simón had the merits to be a candidate and denounced irregularities during the selection process, declaring that he and his team received reports that part of the selection committee, traditionally made up of members of the Venezuelan filmmakers' guild, consisted of unknown persons this year. The reports also described the debate as irregular, with a block of members unwilling to listen to arguments in favor of Simón and even silencing someone who wanted to speak in favor of the film. In addition, the committee included Ray Ugencio, first assistant director of The Shadow of the Sun, creating a conflict of interest. The president of the selection committee, Ignacio Castillo Cottin, has reaffirmed the decision taken by the committee. However, Vicentini also published a video clarifying that his intention was not to harm the film The Shadow of the Sun, but to criticize the National Association of Cinematographic Authors (ANAC), in charge of the selection process, apologizing for the negative effect that his complaint could have.

== Accolades ==
Year	Award / Festival	Category	Recipient	Result	Ref.
2023	Venezuelan Film Festival	Press Award - Best Fiction Feature Film	The Shadow of the Sun	Won	
2023	Venezuelan Film Festival	Best First Feature	The Shadow of the Sun	Won	
2023	Venezuelan Film Festival	Best Actor	Carlos Manuel González	Won	
2023	Venezuelan Film Festival	Best Supporting Actor	Anyelo López	Won	
2023	Venezuelan Film Festival	Best Sound Design	Enrique Diaz	Won	
2023	Georgia Latino International Film Festival	Best International Feature	The Shadow of the Sun	Won	
2023	Georgia Latino International Film Festival	Best Director	Miguel Ángel Ferrer	Won	
2023	FIC Monterrey 2023	Best Latin American Feature Film	The Shadow of the Sun	Won	
2024	Miami Film Festival	Audience Feature Film Award	The Shadow of the Sun	Won	

== See also ==
- List of submissions to the 96th Academy Awards for Best International Feature Film
- List of Venezuelan submissions for the Academy Award for Best International Feature Film
