= The Inner Glow =

2020 film

- Theatrical release poster
- Directed by: Andrés Eduardo Rodríguez; Luis Alejandro Rodríguez
- Written by: Julián Balam; Andrés Eduardo Rodríguez; Luis Alejandro Rodríguez
- Produced by: Luis Castillo
- Cinematography: Alexander Barroeta
- Edited by: Julio Martínez
- Music by: Andrés Levell
- Production company: Villa del Cine
- Release date: 10 September 2020
- Running time: 90 minutes
- Country: Venezuela
- Language: Spanish

The Inner Glow (Spanish: Un destello interior) is a 2020 Venezuelan drama film co-written and directed by Andrés Eduardo Rodríguez and Luis Alejandro Rodríguez. It was selected as the Venezuelan entry for the Best International Feature Film at the 94th Academy Awards.

== Plot ==
A single mother working as a janitor is diagnosed with a brain tumor and fears for the future of her six-year-old daughter.

== See also ==
- List of submissions to the 94th Academy Awards for Best International Feature Film
- List of Venezuelan submissions for the Academy Award for Best International Feature Film
