= Secuestro Express =

- Film poster
- Directed by: Jonathan Jakubowicz
- Written by: Jonathan Jakubowicz
- Produced by: Sandra Condito; Salomon Jakubowicz; Elizabeth Avellán
- Starring: Mía Maestro; Jean Paul Leroux; Rubén Blades
- Cinematography: David Chalker
- Edited by: Ethan Maniquis
- Music by: Angelo Milli
- Production company: Tres Malandros
- Distributed by: Miramax Films
- Release dates: 5 August 2005 (United States); 12 August 2005 (Venezuela)
- Running time: 86 minutes
- Country: Venezuela
- Language: Spanish

Secuestro Express (English: Express Kidnapping) is a 2005 Venezuelan crime film directed by Jonathan Jakubowicz and starring Mía Maestro, Jean Paul Leroux and Rubén Blades. The film became the second highest grossing film of all time in Venezuela; Miramax Films released the film in the United States and some other countries theatrically, making it the first Venezuelan film to be distributed internationally by a major Hollywood studio.

== Plot ==
The film follows the kidnapping of Carla (Maestro) and her boyfriend when they are suddenly kidnapped in Caracas, Venezuela. Carla (Mía Maestro) and Martin (Jean Paul Leroux) are a young upper-class couple fresh from a night of dancing and partying when they cross paths with Trece (Carlos Julio Molina), Budu (Pedro Perez) and Niga (Carlos Madera), three men who make their living by kidnapping unwitting young adults to extort quick money from their wealthy parents.

Carla and Martin become their next victims and are sent on a terrifying overnight journey through Caracas as they wait for Carla's father Sergio (Rubén Blades) to hand over twenty thousand dollars - a small amount for a rich Caraqueño, but the equivalent of more than 8 years of the Venezuelan minimum wage.

They are emotionally and physically hurt, but soon form a relationship with their captors to try to escape. However, none of their plans pan out. They continue in the Land Cruiser, listening and understanding, even if slightly, their captor's point of view. Through the many mishaps they encounter, they begin to, albeit scarily, bond with the kidnappers.

Martin flees the kidnappers in a crowded square, telling Niga to kill his girlfriend, abandoning her. However, he is soon apprehended by one of their cronies and returned to them and murdered in the trunk of a taxi.

After her father pays their ransom, the kidnappers heatedly argue over her fate, between murder, rape, and release. Trece pays some of his shares to the others to release her unharmed, and Carla is soon released, only to be found by another set of kidnappers. However, Trece returns to the scene and shoots them, freeing her again at that time. In the final scene she can be seen with much more modest attire and an inelegant car, continuing her work with sickly, impoverished children.

== Production ==
Jakubowicz wrote the screenplay based on his own experience of being kidnapped.

== Reception ==
Secuestro Express was nominated for Best Foreign Language Film at the 2005 British Independent Film Awards. It was passed uncut (certificate 18) for DVD release in the UK by the British Board of Film Classification. It was released in the UK around the time of a visit by Venezuelan president Hugo Chávez, but did not coincide.

The social narrative is highly discussed, with critics generally in agreement that social issues are made apparent but not commented on, with no "well-examined social theory". According to critic Ed Gonzalez, the film overall gives a "juvenile inspection of [the] country's moral oblivion", and shows a "pat reduction of [its] machismo". Another, Elizabeth Weitzman, offers that "the sadism is so gleefully nasty that it overshadows any rational argument", with Luke Y. Thompson adding that "the apparent thesis that poverty justifies such acts doesn't quite wash"; the New York Times reviewer opines that "the villains become more human, even sympathetic", in this film with "constant threat of violence and rape" that she does say is "difficult to endure". Peter Bradshaw for The Guardian wrote that there is "the lingering suspicion that Jakubowicz can neither be fully and sexily callous in the Tarantino style, nor sober enough to attempt a thorough critique of Venezuelan poverty". However, it still "enraged" Hugo Chávez enough to publicly threaten Jakubowicz, a filmmaker who became more prominent and celebrated in the years after this.

There were several controversies, primarily when the film was not selected to represent Venezuela in the Best Foreign Language category at the Academy Awards, with 1888: El Extraordinario Viaje de Santa Isabel chosen despite being less popular and acclaimed. Also, two lawsuits were filed against the film in the Venezuelan Supreme Court; one to remove the film from circulation because it contained alleged defamation, the other to charge Jakubowicz with promoting drugs and vilifying the regime. Commenting on being threatened, with Chávez saying that he should be in prison, Jakubowicz said "even if they haven't banned the film, they're engaging in a kind of indirect censorship. How will future Venezuelan artists feel about expressing their opinions when [authorities] want to put us in jail even though we never attacked them, or even spoke ill of them at any time?" The controversies made the film more popular in the box office, becoming the second highest grossing film shown in Venezuela ever (behind Shrek 2), earning $2.5 million by November 2005.
