= Opposite Direction =

2020 film

- Film poster
- Directed by: Alejandro Bellame Palacios
- Written by: Alejandro Bellame Palacios; Eduardo Sánchez Rugeles
- Starring: Claudia Rojas; Christian González; Erick Palacios; Diana Volpe; Alberto Alifa
- Cinematography: Alexandra Henao
- Production companies: El Rumor Producciones; TRES Cinematografía; Mediterranea Productions; Soda Producciones; Capitolio Co
- Release date: 2020
- Running time: 100
- Countries: Venezuela; Italy
- Language: Spanish

Opposite Direction (Spanish: Dirección Opuesta) is a 2020 romantic drama film co-written and directed by Alejandro Bellame Palacios and starring Claudia Rojas, Christian González and Erick Palacios. It is based on the novel Blue Label (Spanish: Etiqueta Azul) by Eduardo Sánchez Rugeles. In the film "Eugenia, 30, is torn between fulfilling or not a promise she made 13 years ago to Luis, her brief and tragic adolescent love."

== Awards ==
The film was nominated for the 36th Goya Awards in 2022, for the Best Ibero-American Film category. It received the 3rd place in the Audience Choice Awards of the Chicago Latino Film Festival. In the 17th Venezuelan Film Festival the film was the winner in eight categories, including Best Cinematography, Best Screenplay, Best Fiction Feature, Best Actress, Best Supporting Actress, Best Supporting Actor, Best Makeup, Audience Choice Award; and in the Seattle Latino Film Festival it was the winner in seven categories, including Best Narrative, Best Director, Best Actress, Best Supporting Actor, Best Supporting Actress, Best Editing.
