= Wild 7 =

Japanese manga series by Mikiya Mochizuki

- North American cover of the first manga volume

ワイルド7 (Wairudo Sebun)
- Genre: Action
- Manga
- Written by: Mikiya Mochizuki
- Published by: Shōnen Gahōsha
- English publisher: NA: Comics One
- Magazine: Weekly Shōnen King
- Original run: September 21, 1969 – July 16, 1979
- Volumes: 48
- Television drama
- Directed by: Hideo Rokka, Mio Ezuki; Sadao Nozoki, Yasuharu Hasabe
- Original network: NTV
- Original run: October 9, 1972 – March 26, 1973
- Episodes: 25
- Original video animation
- Directed by: Kiyoshi Egami
- Music by: Kazushi Umezo
- Studio: Studio Kikan
- Licensed by: NA: Enoki Films, Urban Vision
- Released: December 17, 1994 – February 21, 1995
- Runtime: 50 minutes
- Episodes: 2
- Anime television series

Wild 7: Another
- Directed by: Sumio Watanabe
- Music by: Hiroshi Motokura
- Studio: E&G Films
- Licensed by: NA: Discotek Media
- Original network: AT-X
- Original run: April 27, 2002 – August 31, 2002
- Episodes: 13
- Live-action film
- Directed by: Eiichirō Hasumi
- Produced by: Akira Morii
- Written by: Masaki Fukasawa
- Studio: Robot Communications
- Released: December 21, 2011

Wild 7 (Japanese: ワイルド7, Hepburn: Wairudo Sebun) is a Japanese manga series by creator Mikiya Mochizuki that debuted on September 21, 1969 in Weekly Shōnen King where it ran until July 16, 1979. The creation of the manga had been based on the condition that Japan and other non-communist countries were facing in the 1960s and 1970s with the rise of militant student activists and politicians being caught and seen as corrupt with their economies recovering from the days of World War II.

It has been adapted into a live action series, an OVA and a spin-off anime. A live action film adaptation premiered in Japan on December 21, 2011.

== Plot ==
In the wake of rising criminality and terrorist activities in Japan against Japanese nationals, the Japanese National Police Agency has no choice but to authorize the mobilization of a special Counter-terrorist Motorcycle unit consisting of reformed convicts, ranging from simple thugs, individuals forced into prison for simple petty trouble and former Yakuza henchmen and leaders to combat armed criminals and terrorists.

== Media ==
=== Anime ===
The Wild 7 OVA is an adaptation of the manga, however Wild 7 Another television series is a sequel of 13 episodes set after the OVA. It was shown in Japan from April 27 to August 31 of 2002 before airing it on Animax for Latin American viewers from September 9 to November 28 of 2006. The television series was released on DVD with Japanese audio and English subtitles by Discotek Media on July 31, 2018.

=== Live action ===
A live action drama series ran on NTV from 1972 to 1973. Despite being popular with TV viewers, it was forced to end after 25 episodes due to concerns of violence being shown. A live action film was released on December 21, 2011.

== Reception ==
Tony Salvaggio of Comic Book Resources said that Wild 7 was one of the best manga/anime from the 1960s and 1970s, similar to what Golgo 13 and Speed Racer had been through as they had fueled adventure to its readers and viewers. He even pointed out that Wild 7 may have been the antithesis to the popularity of the A-Team.

However, Mike Toole of Anime Jump said that the OVA's character designs are so horrible that the manga artist may have been responsible for it. But he later suggested that the director of the Wild 7 OVA, Kiyoshi Egami, should be held responsible for the OVA character design instead of Mikiya Mochizuki.
