= National Cinematography Law =

Law in Venezuela passed in 1993

The National Cinematography Law is a law ratified in 1993 by the Venezuelan National Assembly, seeking to protect the rights of the Venezuelan filmmaking community and to promote the work of its producers at national and international levels. On 2 June 2015, a reform committee met to discuss possible reforms to the law, wanting to promote national cinema and reduce the showings of foreign films in the country.

== History of the law ==
In 1981, President Luis Herrera Campins created the Fund to Promote Filmmaking (Fondo de Fomento Cinematográfirco; Foncine), which had the objective to promote national filmmaking efforts and to finance the production of both feature and short films. In 1990, by Presidential decree, the Cinemateca Nacional de Venezuela was created, which is currently in force and has the objective to protect all audiovisual content produced in the country.

On 8 September 1993, the first National Cinematography Law was approved by the government of Ramón J. Velázquez, offering an instrument to achieve the organization of a Guild of Filmmakers and to modernize said sector in the country. However, this first version of the law didn't contain any protections for producers and distributors, raising questions about pay-per-screen for national films being a problem that would strongly affect the distribution of them.

Later, on 26 October 2005, the first reform of the law occurred, where the name was changed to "National Cinematography Law" (Spanish: Ley de la Cinematografía Nacional), as well as other changes, like the inclusion of providing a percentage of the pay-per-screen fee for Venezuelan films, greater participation of the private sector in filmmaking activities through taxes and financial incentives, and the creation of the Fund to Promote and Finance Film (Fondo de Promoción y Financiamiento del Cine; FONPROCINE), which has the goal to encourage, promote, develop, and finance the national filmmaking industry.

In 2006, through an executive order, the Villa del Cine was created, the first production house in the country, with the job to produce films that promote national identity, cultural values, diversity, and other themes that encourage national customs.

In 2014, new reforms were proposed, and, in 2015, a reform committee comprising the Commission of Culture and Recreation, the president of Centro Nacional Autónomo de Cinematografía (CNAC), and representatives of the filmmaking industry, met to discuss different proposals, but did not arrive at agreement for any reforms to the law. Since then, there have been efforts to have another evaluation of the proposals with the aim to reform Venezuelan cinema.

== Particulars ==
The law contains 72 articles, divided into 5 chapters and 12 sections. The law came into force 60 days after being published.

=== Protection and development of Venezuela cinema ===
According to what is established in articles 1 and 3, and the introduction, the law has the principal function and objective to develop (i.e. liberate circulation of cinematographic works), encourage, broadcast (including production and distribution), as well as protect and conserve, all audiovisual products and diachronic images organized in speech, with the possibility of being exhibited as mass media.

=== Responsible entity and functions ===
Articles 5 and 6 indicate the creation of the CNAC, as part of the Ministry of Culture. Within this entity, there exist the bodies of the National Administrative Council of Cinema (Consejo Nacional Administrativo), the Executive Committee of Cinema (Comité Ejecutivo) and FONPROCINE.

In article 7, the functions of the CNAC are outlined, which complement the main objectives, some of which are:

- To design the general guidelines of film policy
- To incentivize the creation and protection of cinemas and theatres for exhibition
- To encourage the development and maintenance of a filmmaking infrastructure
- To encourage the constitution of autonomous funds, regional and municipal, for the production, creation, distribution, exhibition, and broadcast of national films

Similarly, in article 8, more specifically, the responsibilities of the sub-bodies are identified. For example, the National Administrative Council's functions include approval and planning of activities, setting financial policies, and promoting conventions.

=== President of the CNAC ===
Article 13 corresponds to the President of the CNAC, who may be freely appointed and removed by the President of Venezuela, and who fulfils the following duties:

- Exercise legal representation of the CNAC
- Develop and present the Internal Operating Plan and the Annual Budget, and submit them to the Executive Committee
- Present to the National Administrative Council the Preliminary Draft of the Cinematography Plan, and adopt the initiatives most convenient for its execution and development
- Apply the established sanctions of the law, and raise requests for exemption with the Executive Committee

=== Assets of the CNAC ===
In article 16, the assets of the CNAC are established as comprising:

1. The rights, goods, actions, and obligations
2. Contributions that are assigned by law
3. The product of the fees established in this law and the income from services provided by the institution
4. Contributions or donations made by natural or legal citizens
5. The amount of the fines and penalties given by the CNAC
6. The amount that FONPROCINE transfers annually to the CNAC

=== The culture of filmmaking, and its distribution ===
In article 17 it is established that the CNAC should stimulate and may carry out activities such as: the importing of cinematographic works of relevant artistic and cultural quality; the teaching, research, conservation, archiving and cultural dissemination of cinematographic works—including coordinating other public or private institutions that perform related activities in the participation of this task; encouraging the attendance of people to cinemas and theatres; and to incentivize and promote the constitution of the spectator committees.

Seeking an adequate and effective distribution of all audiovisual material, the law has specific articles that require an adequate handling of the exhibition of films to be made:

Article 22. The CNAC should promote a policy of distribution of films of relevant artistic and cultural quality

Article 23. The cinemas and exhibition theatres are by nature places of culture and recreation. The entities that are public and private, national, state and municipal, should promote and incentivize their construction and conservation to benefit the people

Article 26. All cinematographic or audiovisual works, prior to their distribution, sale and exhibition, should be classified corresponding to age group, by the CNAC. The guidelines should establish the procedure to follow for the achievement of this without breaking the Law of Municipal Public Power (Spanish: Ley Orgánica del Poder Público Municipal).

=== Copy and Commercialization ===
Each distributor must make a minimum copy quota that is not less than 20% of the number of copies of the foreign cinematographic works that it sells, according to article 29. Regarding commercialization, article 30 indicates that all Venezuelan audiovisual work or product will be guaranteed distribution, with a variable period of screening. The minimum length of cinema stay is two weeks.

1. For film complexes that have more than five screens, the equivalent of twelve weeks of cinema
2. For film complexes that have between two and five screens, the equivalent of six weeks of cinema
3. For film complexes that have a screen, the equivalent of three weeks of cinema

Article 34 provides that the CNAC will decide the stay of a film according to its ticket sales. This applies to national and international material.

=== Promoting and financing the cinema industry ===
As provided by article 36, there is an autonomous fund not intended for legislation, FONPROCINE. This is assigned and administered by the CNAC, with separate assets, and made up of contributions from the public and private sector, income from international cooperation, and income generated by the development or promotion of film activities.

According to article 40, this money is destined for:

1. The creation of works of national cinema
2. The distribution of cinematographic works that are national, independent Latino- and Ibero-American, and other works of a universal quality which will contribute to the development of the principle of cultural diversity
3. The establishment, updating and improvement of cinemas and exhibition theatres
4. The establishment or updating of laboratories for processing and copying film
5. The establishment or updating of facilities for dubbing, subtitling, post-production, and new technologies
6. The stimulation, subsidies, and incentives for the production of Venezuelan cinema

=== Certification of films ===
According to article 42, films will be certified as national if they meet the criteria of: cinematographic works, of non-advertising or propaganda, with Venezuelan director or when the script, adaptation, plot, story, dialogue or technical script has a Venezuelan author, or either are a foreigner who is a legal resident of the country. The Executive Committee may demand the requirements for works also in Spanish or an indigenous language.

With article 44, the CNAC may promote binational or multinational agreements, pacts or conventions, according to which foreign cinematographic works may obtain the same benefits granted to nationals, provided there are conditions of reciprocity.

=== Guarantee of creative freedom ===
Article 47 states that no creator or producer may be deprived of personal freedom because of the subject, content, script, characters or other elements inherent in the message or idea of the cinematographic work, unless there is a judicial decision in court.

Also, article 48 says that the public exhibition of a cinematographic work in any medium, as well as its sale, rent or commercialization, can not be objected to censorship or cuts without the express and prior authorization from the holder of the work's authorship rights.

=== Fees and contributions ===
According to articles 50 and 51 of the law, a special contribution or tax should be enforced, that will be paid by legal or natural citizens whose registered business is the exhibition of cinematographic works for commercial purposes. It will be paid to FONPROCINE and be equivalent to 5% of the value of the ticket. Those who work in exhibition but in alternative or independent theatres may be exempt from this fee. The tax will be self-assessed and must be paid within the first fifteen days of the month following.

In article 51 it is outlined that companies that provide television service with an open signal for commercial purposes will pay FONPROCINE a different special contribution, calculated based on the gross income received from the sale of advertising spaces. This will be paid annually within the first forty-five continuous days of the calendar year following.

On the other hand, article 52 says that companies that provide television service with signal broadcasting by subscription for commercial purposes—be it cable, satellite or any other present of future system—would pay FONCINE a special contribution that will be determined as follows: 5 tenths percent (0.50%) the first year, one percent (1%) the second year, and one and a half percent (1.5%) from the third year, of the gross income of the company's commercial profit from subscription service. This will be paid quarterly within the first fifteen continuous days of the month following.

Article 53. Commercial distributors of cinematographic works will pay to FONPROCINE a special contribution, equivalent to (5%) of their gross income, exigible within the first forty-five continuous days following the expiration of the respective year. This provision shall not apply to persons whose gross income obtained in the respective fiscal period does not exceed ten thousand tax units (10,000 UT).

Article 54. Natural or legal citizens engaged in the rental or sale of videograms, digital video discs, as well as any other existing or future duplication system, will pay FONPROCINE, a special contribution equivalent to five percent (5%) of their monthly invoicing, without affecting the corresponding value added tax, payable within the first fifteen continuous days following the month of the occurrence of the taxable event.

Article 55. The natural or legal citizens, referred to in the previous article, must place on each videogram, case, or container of the cinematographic work, before its sale or rental, the printed or computerized media that the CNAC establish to the effect. These can not be marketed without the badge to identify their corresponding record.

Article 56. The companies regularly engage in, for profit, the technical, technological, logistic, or other service for the production and creation of cinematographic works in the national territory, will pay to FONPROCINE a special contribution, equivalent to one percent (1%) of the gross income obtained in those activities, payable quarterly, within fifteen (15) days following the end of the quarter.

=== Exemptions, exonerations, and stimuli ===
Article 57 specifies that income tax-payers who make investments or donations to Venezuelan production or co-production film projects authorized by the CNAC may include as an expense (in the determination of the corresponding income tax to the taxable period in which the investment or donation is made and regardless of its income producing activity) the total of the real value invested or donated.

The regulation of the law will establish the conditions, terms, and requirements to grant this tax benefit. In no case will it be granted to advertising or propaganda cinema.

Articles 58 and 60 explain that during the first five years counted, the legal entities that produce, distribute, and exhibit national cinematographic works of a non-advertising or propaganda nature, are exempt from the payment of income tax for the income and net benefits obtained from said activities. Film exhibitors may reduce by up to twenty-five percent (25%) of the special contribution they pay, as directly beneficial to the exhibition activity, when they exhibit Venezuelan cinematographic works (certified as such by the CNAC) beyond the screen quota indicated in article 30.

=== Infractions and sanctions ===
According to Article 63, the sanctions established in this law must be applied by the CNAC, for the purpose of establishing penalties for tax or administrative faults (as set out in the Organic Tax Code and in the Organic Law of Administrative Procedures), as soon as they are applicable.

Article 68. The CNAC, may order the stoppage of any cinematographic work of foreign production that does not have permission, without prejudice, and impose a fine of fifty tax units (50 U.T.).

Article 69. The CNAC, at the request of an interested party or ex officio, may, through a reasonable administrative act, order preventive retention of support or any nature containing cinematographic works that have not complied with the provisions of this law. For this it can request the aid of the public force.

=== Procedure and arbitration ===
Article 71. The sanctioning administrative procedures initiated by the CNAC are governed by the principles of speed, efficiency, economy and immediacy. The procedures will be initiated by complaint of an interested party or ex officio. The legal consultancy of the CNAC will open the procedure itself, following the rules established in the Law of Administrative Procedures. Then, on the same day, the citation of the accused will be ordered, as appropriate, so that on the third working day following the citation the response may be recorded, or the charges dropped. Next, a trial period of five working days will open. The parties will present their conclusions within the next two business days.

The legal consultancy will present on the fifth working day a draft decision to the Executive Committee, who will make a decision within thirty business days following its receipt, thus exhausting the administrative procedure.

Jurisdictional appeals against the decision may be made in the following thirty working days, counted from the notification. This mechanism suspends the effects of the act.

Article 72. The individuals and legal entities subject of this Law will submit to arbitration unresolved disputes between them, that arise with respect to the legal relationships regulated by it, in accordance with the provisions of the Commercial Arbitration Law.

== Additional laws in the filmmaking sector ==
Within the broad audiovisual field there are many issues that fall within different sectors and other types of laws and regulations are applicable.

Some relevant laws include:

- Regulation of the National Cinematography Law
- Internal Regulation of Stimulus to the Culture of Filmmaking
- Authorial Rights Law
- Law of Culture

Likewise, Antonio D 'Jesús, the Permanent Secretary of the Commission for Culture and Recreation, issued a statement in December 2016 regarding the problems of censorship with the Venezuelan film El Inca which, in accordance with the aforementioned laws, should be given:

1. Guarantee of Freedom of Creation
2. Understanding that the freedom of creation is part of Venezuelan cultural diversity
3. All Venezuelans have the right to access Venezuelan cultural diversity through release, production and investment
