= Jonathan Jakubowicz =

Venezuelan filmmaker (b.1978)

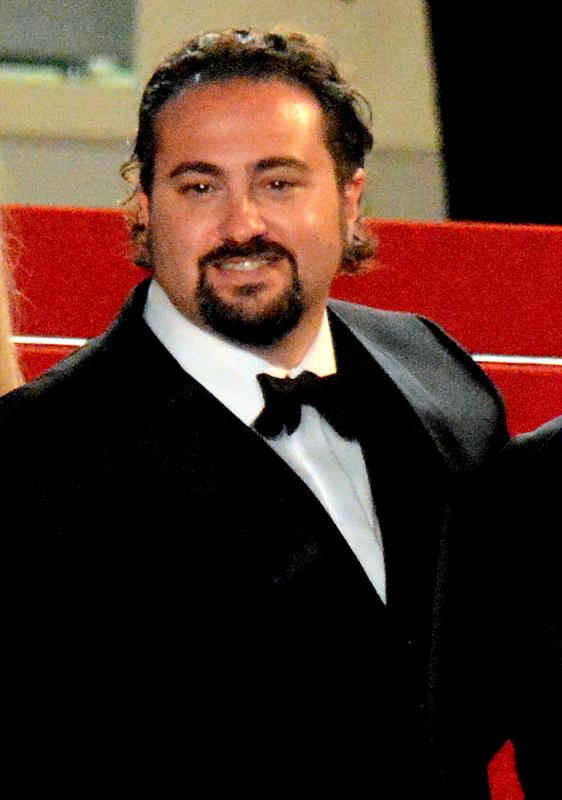
- Jakubowicz at the 2016 Cannes Film Festival
- Born: Jonathan Jakubowicz Zielinski; 29 January 1978 (age 48); Caracas, Venezuela
- Other name: Jonathan J. Zielinski
- Citizenship: Venezuela; Poland; United States
- Education: Central University of Venezuela
- Occupations: Film director; producer; screenwriter; editor; composer
- Years active: 2000–present

Jonathan Jakubowicz Zielinski (born 29 January 1978) is a Venezuelan filmmaker and writer, winner of the German Film Peace Prize 2020 for his film "Resistance". His film Secuestro Express was nominated for Best Foreign Language Film at the British Independent Film Awards and was a New York Times "Critics' Pick" in 2005. He is of Polish-Jewish descent.

== Career ==
Secuestro Express became the nation's biggest box office hit at that time.

His film, Hands of Stone (2016), is about the relationship between Panamanian boxer Roberto Durán (played by Édgar Ramírez) and his trainer Ray Arcel (played by Robert De Niro). Hands of Stone premiered in the Cannes Film Festival 2016 and was warmly received with a 15-minute standing ovation. It is the first Latin movie to have a simultaneous wide release in all of Latin America.

His latest film, Resistance, stars Jesse Eisenberg, Ed Harris, Edgar Ramirez, and Clemence Poesy. It tells the story of a group of Boy and Girl Scouts who saved thousands of orphans during the Holocaust. One of them was the legendary resistance fighter Georges Loinger, who met with Jakubowicz and helped him with the research of the film, before he died on 28 December 2018. Georges Loinger was the first cousin of Marcel Marceau and died at 108 years of age.

Resistance was released in the United States on 27 March 2020, by IFC Films during the COVID-19 pandemic, and it became the number one theatrical movie in America for two weeks in a row. Most multiplexes were closed, and only a few independent and drive-in theaters remained opened, which gave Resistance the most unusual top box office spot of all time. The film was awarded The German Film Peace Prize 2020, and it was in the official selection of the Shanghai Film Festival, The Munich Film Festival, and the Festival du Cinema Americain de Deauville, among others.

== Political views ==
Through his literary work and interviews, Jonathan Jakubowicz has commented on political developments in Venezuela. His novel Las Aventuras de Juan Planchard has been described by the author as reflecting opposition to the government of Nicolás Maduro. Jakubowicz has also addressed themes such as political polarization in his public statements. His first film, Secuestro Express, examines issues of crime, social inequality, and class divisions in Venezuela, and was criticized by officials of the Hugo Chávez government. His second film, Hands of Stone, depicts the life of boxer Roberto Durán and explores themes including identity, nationalism, and the historical relationship between Panama and the United States. Resistance is set during the Holocaust and depicts the role of Marcel Marceau in helping Jewish children evade persecution by Nazi Germany. His documentary Soul of a Nation examines divisions within Israeli society and includes perspectives both critical and supportive of the government of Benjamin Netanyahu. "For the past two years, Israel has been impossible to ignore,” Jakubowicz said in a statement. “Yet amid the noise, one crucial element was missing: nuance. Every side pushed its agenda so forcefully that it became extraordinarily difficult to grasp the horrific events unfolding before our eyes. But we didn’t just watch from the sidelines. In the months leading up to October 7th, we were on the ground in Israel, documenting a nation on the edge of crisis. As someone who grew up in Venezuela, I know what polarization can do to a democracy. In Israel I saw similar fractures—hundreds of thousands in the streets, leaders warning of collapse. What we uncovered was not just division, but a nation fatally exposed to the horrors that soon followed.” Jakubowicz is a supporter of Israel. He signed an open letter denouncing Jonathan Glazer for comparing the Holocaust to Israel's war in Gaza. He stated his view that "If Israel had existed in the 1930s and 40s, Auschwitz would not have happened...It’s important to call for peace, and we all do. But in this conflict disinformation prolongs the war...his comments unfortunately gave legitimacy to the propaganda networks interested in prolonging the war to demonize the Jewish people."

== Filmography ==
=== Film ===
Year	Title	Director	Writer	Producer	Notes
2000	Ships of Hope	Yes	Yes	No	Documentary
2002	Distance	Yes	Yes	Yes	Short film
2005	Secuestro Express	Yes	Yes	Yes	
2016	Hands of Stone	Yes	Yes	Yes	
2020	Resistance	Yes	Yes	Yes	also editor
TBA	Untitled De Niro/Ramirez/Jakubowicz Project	Yes	Yes	Yes	
2025	Soul of a Nation	Yes	Yes	Yes	Documentary

=== Television ===
Year	Title	Notes
2012	Lynch	2 episodes
2011-13	Prófugos	16 episodes

== Novels ==
In November 2016, Jakubowicz published his first novel Las Aventuras de Juan Planchard, which became a best seller in the Spanish language market. In Venezuela, the book broke sales records and was read in public gatherings, as well as on a community of fifty thousand people that define themselves as "resistance to the Maduro dictatorship (Resistencia Venezuela hasta los tuétanos)", on the app Zello.

In July 2020, Jakubowicz published La Venganza de Juan Planchard, the sequel to his first novel. It immediately rose to the #1 spot in of Best Sellers in Spanish Language Fiction, in Amazon.

Las Aventuras de Juan Planchard was adapted for the stage by 2016 National Medal of Arts award winning theater director Moisés Kaufman at Manhattan’s Tectonic Theater Project.
