= Kill Devil =

- DVD cover
- Directed by: Yuichi Onuma
- Written by: Hiroshi Kanno; Mikaho Ishikawa
- Produced by: Yoshinori Kanou; Kousuke Hishinuma
- Starring: Yoshika Kato; Masahiro Kuranuki; Yoshihisa Higashiyama; Syunsuke Osaka; Yūko Daike; Masaru Matsuda; Ken Kazama
- Edited by: Shuichi Kakesu
- Music by: Masatoshi Nishimura
- Distributed by: Urban Vision Entertainment
- Release date: 2003
- Running time: 86 minutes
- Country: Japan
- Language: Japanese

Kill Devil (キル・鬼ごっこ, Kiru Onigokko; lit. "Kill Tag") is a 2003 Japanese film directed by Yuichi Onuma about a group of juvenile delinquents set in the year 2025. The juveniles are host to a "murder gene", and are sent to an uninhabited island by the government so that they can be rehabilitated. The government studies the causes of the gene, and implants an experiment on the juveniles called a "Tag". The Tag gives the juveniles murder impulses and memory loss, and both boys and girls start to brutally kill each other.

This movie was distributed by AsiaVision, the Asian live-action label from Urban Vision Entertainment.

== Reception ==
In a review at Horror.com, Staci Layne Wilson found that the film "combine[d] random elements of Lost, Saw/Saw II, Gattaca, Lord of the Flies and The Running Man."
