= Blue and Not So Pink =

2012 Venezuelan film

- Theatrical release poster
- Directed by: Miguel Ferrari
- Screenplay by: Miguel Ferrari
- Produced by: Rodolfo Cova; Antonio Hens Córdova
- Starring: Guillermo García; Nacho Montes; Hilda Abrahamz
- Cinematography: Alexandra Henao
- Edited by: Miguel Ángel García
- Music by: Sergio de la Puente
- Distributed by: TLA Releasing (US)
- Release dates: 27 November 2012 (Venezuela); 11 July 2014 (NYC)
- Running time: 113 mins
- Country: Venezuela/Spain
- Language: Spanish

Blue and Not So Pink (Spanish: Azul y no tan rosa, released in the U.S. as My Straight Son) is a 2012 comedy-drama film written and directed by Miguel Ferrari in his directorial debut.

The film won the Goya Award for Best Spanish Language Foreign Film at the 28th Goya Awards in 2014, the first Venezuelan film to do so.

The film deals with controversial issues in Venezuelan society: homophobic violence, homosexuality, transsexualism and domestic violence. The film had its U.S. premiere on 25 June 2014 at the Frameline Film Festival.

== Plot ==
Diego is a photographer living in Caracas. In the opening scene, he photographs a performance choreographed by his friend Delirio del Río, who is a transgender woman. Diego meets his partner Fabrizio in a restaurant, and they kiss. Diego's employee Perla Marina turns up late to work, making excuses to hide the domestic violence inflicted on her by her partner Iván. Diego has lunch with his family, where they display homophobic opinions, which are also seen in the TV programme hosted by Estrellita.

Diego's son Armando returns to Caracas to live with Diego, after spending five years in Madrid with his mother. Their relationship is strained at first. Armando lacks confidence in his appearance. Shortly after Armando's arrival, Diego's partner Fabrizio is the victim of a homophobic attack by a gang led by Rasco, outside the Club 69 where Delirio is performing. Diego tries unsuccessfully to get Rasco arrested. In the aftermath of the attack, Diego, Armando, Delirio and Perla Marina come together. The four practice tango together to help Armando impress Laura, a girl he has met on the internet. After Fabrizio dies, Armando joins Diego to stand up to Rasco and his gang. They are attacked by the gang, but Delirio, in full stage make-up and high heels, scares the gang off with a warning shot.

Diego, Armando, Delirio and Perla Marina take a road trip to Mérida to plant a tree for Fabrizio and for Armando to meet Laura at a tango dance. Perla Marina admits she is pregnant. On returning home, she finally stands up to Iván and decides to raise the baby alone. At the end of the film, a dancer at the club reveals he filmed the attack on Fabrizio on his phone. Rasgo is arrested. Diego becomes closer to his family, who accept his homosexuality. Armando returns to Madrid much more confident. Estrellita's TV show is replaced by 'Noches de Delirio'. Delirio delivers a monologue urging acceptance of difference.

== Cast ==
- Guillermo García as Diego
- Nacho Montes (aka Ignacio Montes González) as Armando
- Hilda Abrahamz as Delirio del Río
- Carolina Torres as Perla Marina
- Alexander Da Silva as Racso
- Sócrates Serrano as Fabrizio
- Elba Escobar as Rocío
- Beatriz Valdés as Estrellita
- Jose Roberto Diaz as Doctor
- Aroldo Betancourt as Luis Fernando
