= Triad Stage =

Theatre company in North Carolina, US

Triad Stage at The Pyrle Theater
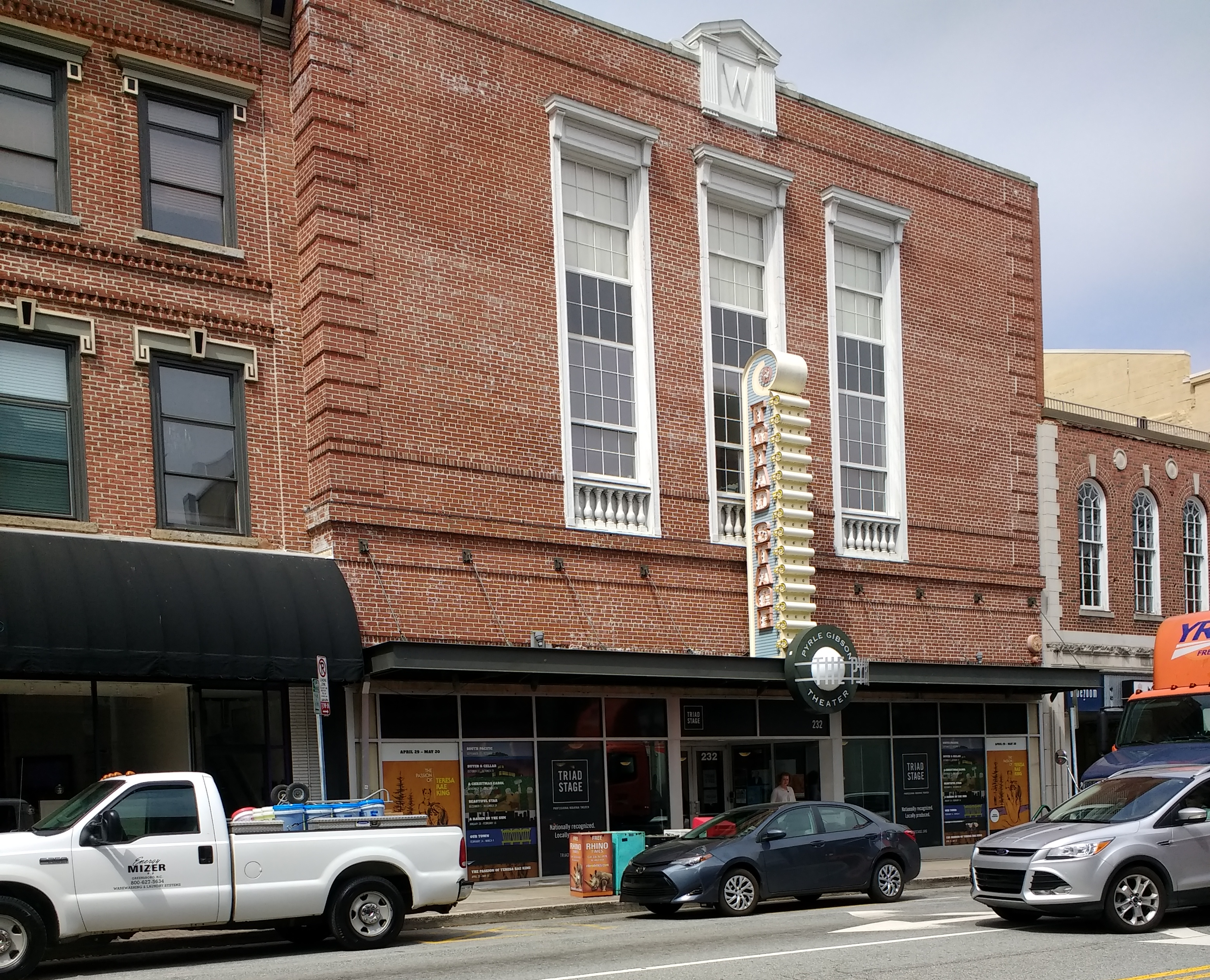
- Interactive map of Triad Stage at The Pyrle Theater
- Address: 232 South Elm Street; Greensboro, North Carolina; United States
- Coordinates: 36.070684°N 79.790533°W
- Capacity: 300
- Type: Regional theatre

Construction
- Opened: January 2002
- Closed: June 20, 2023

Website
- triadstage.org

Triad Stage was a regional theatre in Greensboro, North Carolina.

== History ==
Triad Stage began with the goal of creating a professional, not-for-profit regional theater to serve the communities of the Piedmont Triad. Co-founders Preston Lane and Richard Whittington forged their artistic partnership as graduate students at the Yale School of Drama.

In September 1999, Triad Stage purchased the former Montgomery Ward building, which had been built in 1936 and lay vacant for almost 40 years. Renovations began in spring 2001, transforming the five-story building into a theater center (The Pyrle Theater) offering a 300-seat live performance space, rehearsal hall, offices, two spacious lobbies, special events areas and other audience amenities.

The grand opening took place in January 2002 with Tennessee Williams' Suddenly, Last Summer.

In 2008, Triad Stage finished a second round of renovations. A scene shop annex was added in the basement. The top floor underwent major construction to turn what was previously a storage center into the 80-seat Upstage Cabaret performance space, the Sloan Rehearsal Hall and the studio and office facilities of WUNC North Carolina Public Radio's Greensboro Bureau.

In 2011, Triad Stage purchased a 30,000-square-foot (2,800 m^{2}) building near the Greensboro Coliseum Complex to serve as the theater's new production facility, relocating its scene, costume and properties shops as well as its warehouse.

In 2013, Triad Stage expanded its season to include shows in Winston-Salem.

In November 2020, the theatre's co-founder and artistic director, Preston Lane, resigned following accusations of sexual misconduct.

The theatre reopened in October 2022. However, on April 19, 2023, the theatre paused operations again due to financial difficulties. On June 20, 2023, the company announced its closure.

== Recognition ==
The theater company received accolades on the national, state and local levels:

- "One of the Best Regional Theaters in America" by New York's Drama League
- "Best Live Theater" by the readers of the News & Record's GoTriad thirteen years in a row
- "Professional Theatre of the Year" by the North Carolina Theatre Conference twice.
- "Top ten most promising theatres in the country" by The American Theatre Wing, as the recipient of a 2010 National Theatre Company Grant.
- Its production of Tobacco Road was listed among the "Best of 2007" by The Wall Street Journal.

Triad Stage has been spotlighted in American Theatre, Stage Directions, Southern Living, Playbill.com, Our State and UNC-TV's North Carolina Weekend.
