= Desautorizados =

- Film poster
- Directed by: Elia K. Schneider
- Written by: Fernando Butazzoni
- Produced by: Joseph Novoa
- Starring: Erich Wildpret
- Cinematography: Óscar Pérez
- Edited by: Mariano Saban
- Music by: Osvaldo Montes
- Release date: 2010
- Running time: 128 minutes
- Countries: Venezuela; Spain; Uruguay
- Language: Spanish

Desautorizados (stylized Des-autorizados) is a 2010 Venezuelan-Spanish-Uruguayan comedy movie directed by Elia Scheneider and starring Erich Wildpret, Samantha Dagnino, Albi de Abreu, and Juan Carlos Alarcón.

In 2026, the film is available on Amazon Prime Video.

== Cast ==
- Erich Wildpret as Elias/Vincent
- Albi de Abreu as Andy
- Samantha Dagnino as Nina
- Juan Carlos Alarcon as Federico
- Dag Dager as Raquel
- Rafael Uribe as Matta
- Paul Gamez as Violinist
- Manuel Trotta as Abi

== Reception ==
According to director Emanuel Uribe, one of the key point is the plot, really original, but the slow execution make the movie a little boring.
