= Anabel Rodríguez Ríos =

Venezuelan film director

- Born: March 22, 1977 (age 49); Caracas, Venezuela
- Occupations: Film director, screenwriter

Anabel Rodríguez Ríos (born 22 March 1977) is a Venezuelan film director and screenwriter. Her feature-length debut and documentary film, Once Upon a Time in Venezuela, was Venezuela's submission for the 93rd Academy Awards.

== Education ==
In 1998 Rodríguez Ríos graduated from the School of Social Communication at the Andrés Bello Catholic University (UCAB) and later studied filmmaking at the London Film School in Vienna, Austria, as part of a student agreement between the two countries.

== Career ==
In 2003 she directed the short film Toilet and in 2008 she was one of the directors involved in the anthology film 1, 2 and 3 women. In 2008 Anabel visited for the first time Congo Mirador, a town in the Zulia state located on Lake Maracaibo, and in 2013 she began shooting her production, after a previous project called El Galón, which led her to have her first contact with the town. Her latest short film, El Galón, part of the Why Poverty series, participated in more than fifty festivals..

In 2020, she made her solo debut with the feature-length documentary Once Upon a Time in Venezuela. The documentary was part of the 2020 Sundance Film Festival selection, was Venezuela's submission for the 93rd Academy Awards and was praised by international critics, receiving an 88% approval rating on Rotten Tomatoes.

== Filmography ==
- Toilet (2003) (short film)
- 1, 2 y 3 mujeres (2008) (anthology film)
- El Galón (short film)
- Once Upon a Time in Venezuela (2020) (feature film)
