= Oro Diablo =

- Film poster
- Directed by: José Ramón Novoa
- Starring: Rocío Miranda; Laureano Olivares; Armando Gota; Pedro Lander; José Gregorio Rivas
- Release date: June 13, 2000
- Running time: 86 minutes
- Countries: Venezuela; Spain
- Language: Spanish

Oro Diablo (lit. 'Devil's Gold') is a 2000 action drama film co-written and directed by José Ramón Novoa. It was Venezuela's submission to the 73rd Academy Awards for the Academy Award for Best Foreign Language Film, but was not accepted as a nominee.

The film forms part of a trilogy, with the first part being Sicario.

== Cast ==
- Rocío Miranda - Isabel
- Laureano Olivares - Cae
- Armando Gota - Gallego
- Pedro Lander - Aroldo
- José Gregorio Rivas - José María "Chema"
- Juan Carlos Alarcon
- Alberto Rowinsky
- Jenny Noguera as Carmen
- Janeth Lehr as Zuleima
- Maria Cecilia Osuber as Selva
- Jose Gregorio Rivas as Chema

== Critics ==
The movie have 10 reviews in the platform imdb

== See also ==
- List of submissions to the 73rd Academy Awards for Best Foreign Language Film
