= Centro Nacional Autónomo de Cinematografía =

The Centro Nacional Autónomo de Cinematografía (CNAC) (English: Autonomous National Center of Filmmaking) is the governing body of the Venezuelan cinema created by the Venezuelan government in 1993. It is responsible for selecting the films which will represent Venezuela in international film awards like the Academy Awards and Goya Awards. It is headquartered in Los Ruices, Caracas.

== History ==
Following the introduction of the National Cinematography Law in 1993, the existing FONCINE film body had to be closed and replaced with a more accountable and public institute by the next year; the CNAC was officially opened in 1994.

When the law was reformed in 2005, several expansions in CNAC happened; the Rodolfo Santana Venezuelan Cinema and Audiovisual Lab opened, as well as several provisions for targeted funding (the Film Training Support System (SAFCine), the Cinematographic Script Support System (SAGCine), and the Cinematographic Research Support System (SAINCine)).

The President of the CNAC can be appointed and removed by the President of Venezuela at will, and is responsible for the executive functions of the organisation. In 2016, the Deputy Culture Minister Aracelis García was appointed CNAC President; this caused a lot of controversy and "alarmed" the Venezuelan Cinema Guild, as the CNAC should (by law) be independent from the government. They were worried that film direction in the country would be forced to have a strong political bias.

The CNAC awards several scholarships in different areas of film for development and education, having given over 1500 by 2017. It also supports the development of animated cinema in Latin America, and film education in other countries, like the Autonomous University of Barcelona in Catalonia.

== Presidents ==
The presidents of the CNAC since 1994 have been:

1. Sergio Dahba
2. Abdel Güerere
3. Gileni Gómez Muci
4. Maurice Reyna
5. Juan Carlos Lossada
6. Luis Girón
7. Juan Carlos Lossada
8. Andrea Gouverneur
9. Juan Carlos Lossada
10. Alizar Dahdah (acting)
11. Aracelis García
12. Roque Valero
13. Vladimir Sosa Sarabia
14. Carlos Azpúrua

== See also ==
- List of Venezuelan submissions for the Academy Award for Best Foreign Language Film
- National Cinematography Law
