= Sicario (1994 film) =

- Film poster
- Directed by: Joseph Novoa
- Written by: David Suárez
- Produced by: Joseph Novoa; Elia Schneider; Philippe Toledano
- Starring: Laureano Olivares
- Cinematography: Óscar Pérez
- Edited by: Joseph Novoa
- Distributed by: Joel Films
- Release date: August 12, 1994
- Running time: 108 minutes
- Country: Venezuela
- Language: Spanish

Sicario is a 1994 Venezuelan drama film directed by Joseph Novoa. The film was submitted as the Venezuelan entry for the Academy Award for Best Foreign Language Film. It also was a finalist at the Goya Award for Best Spanish Language Foreign Film 1995.

== Plot ==
Jairo is a teenager living in a drugs- and violence-infested neighborhood who becomes a hired killer or sicario for a criminal gang.

== Cast ==
- Laureano Olivares as Jairo
- Herman Gil as Aurelio
- Néstor Terán as Tigre
- Melissa Ponce as Rosa
- Gledys Ibarra as Carlota
- William Moreno as Aguirre

== Production ==
The story takes place in Medellín, Colombia; it was filmed in Caracas, Venezuela.

== See also ==
- List of submissions to the 68th Academy Awards for Best Foreign Language Film
- List of Venezuelan submissions for the Academy Award for Best Foreign Language Film
