= Jacobo Penzo =

Venezuelan film director

Jacobo Penzo (born 1948 in Carora; died 2020 in Caracas), was a Venezuelan filmmaker, best known for his drama piece The House of Water, shown in the Directors' Fortnight section of the Cannes Film Festival in 1984. The film also represented Venezuela in the Best Foreign Language Film competition at the 57th Academy Awards. Penzo is also a painter and a writer.

== Biography ==
Jacobo Penzo was born in Carora Lara, Venezuela on September 22, 1948. He moved to Caracas with his family in 1957. After high school he studied journalism at the Central University of Venezuela. From 1999 to 2002 Penzo was President of the Venezuelan National Cinematheque Foundation (Cinemateca Nacional)

== Awards ==
- Venezuelan National Cinema Award (Premio Nacional de Cine de Venezuela) in 2002.
- Ordre des Arts et des Lettres by the Government of France in 2007 in recognition to Penzo´s artistic talents

== Films ==
- The House of Water ("La Casa de Agua"), 1984
- Música Nocturna ("Night Music"), 1987
- En territorio Extranjero ("On A Foreign Land") 1993
- Borrador ( "Draft" ) co-production, 2006
- Cabimas donde todo comenzó ("Cabimas, the burst") 2012

== Documentaries ==
Some of Penzo´s documentaries are:

- Falso Retrato de Luis Alberto Crespo (" Fake Portrait of LAC ") 2014
- El Profeta Olvidado ( "The Forgotten Prophet" ), co-production with Carlos Azpúrua 2003
- Maracaibo Blues 2001
- Algunas Preguntas a la Mujeres (Questions to Women) 1984
- El Silencio de la Memoria ("The Silence of the Past") 1986
- La Pastora Resiste ("The Old Town Battle") 1982
- El Afinque de Marín ("The Barrio Beat") 1980
- Tecnología para el hombre ("Progress for The People") 1986
- El Compadre Antonio ("Saint Anthony: a Friend of the People") 1982
- Dos Ciudades ("Two Cities") 1982

== Writings ==
- Veinte años por un Cine de Author, essay, 2000
- Que Habrá sido de Herbert Marcuse, short stories, 2014
- Rumores, poems, 2015
