= List of Venezuelan films =

This is a list of films produced in Venezuela.

== Early film ==
Title	Director	Cast	Genre	Notes
1897
Un célebre especialista sacando muelas en el gran Hotel Europa			Documentary	First film
Muchachos bañándose en la laguna de Maracaibo			Documentary	
Disputa entre Andracistas y Rojistas				
Una paliza en el estado Sarría				
Carlos Ruiz peleando con un cochero			proto-Western	
1899
Joropo de negros en el Orinoco	Carlos Ruiz Chapellín		Folk tale	
1901
Diálogos de Tirabeque y Pelegrín	G. Romegout, a Lumière worker			First certain fiction and first sound film made in Venezuela
Bailes populares	Romegout		Folktale	Featuring sound
Coplas de Gedeón	Romegout			Featuring sound
1903
Unknown (likely multiple)	Manuel Trujillo Durán and Alfredo Duplat			Possibly made in Colombia; shown in Venezuela by Venezuelans (August 13–27)
1908
5 de Julio or 5 de Julio: Película Criolla	Manuel Ignacio Baralt, Servio Tulio Baralt and Manuel Delhom		Documentary	Made in honor of the president of Carabobo state, Dr. Samuel E. Niño
Las Trincheras-Valencia	S. T. Baralt and M. Delhom		Documentary	
1909
Carnival in Caracas	M. A. Gonhom and Augusto González Vidal		Documentary	Said to be filmed on primitive cameras, but enjoyed by the audience who wanted to see the subject
1913
Don Confusio	Lucas Manzano			
La dama de las Cayenas	Enrique Zimmerman		Parody	First feature film
1923
La Trepadora	Edgar J. Anzola & Jacobo Capriles			
1928
Los milagros de la Divina Pastora	Amábilis Cordero			
1932
La venus de Nácar: Fantasía Aborigen	Efrain Gómez			First sound film
1938
Taboga				Features synchronous sound
El Rompimiento				Features synchronous sound

== 1940s ==
Title	Director	Cast	Genre	Notes
1941
Juan de la calle	Rafael Rivero		Social cinema	Production by Rómulo Gallegos
1945
Alma llanera	Manuel Pelufo			
Las Aventuras de Frijolito y Robustiana	José María Galofré			
Dos hombres en la tormenta	Rafael Rivero			
1949
El demonio es un ángel	Carlos Hugo Christensen			
La Balandra Isabel llegó esta tarde	Carlos Hugo Christensen	Juana Sujo, Tomás Henríquez	Drama	Cannes Film Festival winner: Best Cinematography

== 1950s ==
Title	Director	Cast	Genre	Notes
1950
Amanecer a la vida	Fernando Cortés	Susana Guízar, Luis Salazar, Néstor Zavarce	Drama	
La escalinata	César Enríquez			Independent film
1951
Seis meses de vida	Víctor Urruchúa	Hermelinda Alvarado, Amador Bendayan, Francisco Bernalche	Drama	
1952
Reverón	Margot Benacerraf		Documentary	
1953
Luz en el páramo	Víctor Urruchúa			Entered into the 1953 Cannes Film Festival
1954
Noche de milagros	Renzo Russo	Elena Fernan, Aldo Monti, Violeta Peñalver	Drama	
1957
Caín Adolescente	Román Chalbaud	Carlota Ureta Zambrano, Milagros del Valle, Edgar Jimenez, Rafael Briceño	Drama	Román Chalbaud's first movie
1959
Araya	Margot Benacerraf	José Ignacio Cabrujas (narrator)	Documentary	1959 Cannes Film Festival nominee: Golden Palm

== 1960s ==
Title	Director	Cast	Genre	Notes
1962
Séptimo Paralelo	Elia Marcelli			
1963
Cuentos para mayores	Román Chalbaud	Manuel Poblete, Carmen Mesutti, Héctor Cabrera		
1964
Isla de sal	Clemente de la Cerda	Simón Díaz, Lila Morillo		Clemente de la Cerda's first movie
1965
EFPEUM	Mauricio Odremán		Science fiction	
La ciudad que nos ve	Jesús Enrique Guédez		Mockumentary	Social compromise film
1966
Loco por ellas	Manuel de la Pedrosa	Germán Valdés "Tin-Tan", Lorena Velázquez	Comedy Romance	
1968
La Universidad Vota en Contra	Jesús E. Guédez	Documentary		

== 1970s ==
Title	Director	Cast	Genre	Notes
1971
Chévere o La victoria de Wellington	Román Chalbaud	Eva Moreno, José Royo, Alfredi Berry		
1973
Cuando quiero llorar no lloro	Mauricio Walerstein	Valentín Trujillo, Orlando Urdaneta, Verónica Castro, Miguel Ángel Landa, Haydée Balza Fernando Arriaga, Rafael Briceño	Drama	Film based on the homonymous novel Cuando quiero llorar no lloro by Miguel Otero Silva; entered into the 8th Moscow International Film Festival
1975
Crónica de un subversivo latinoamericano	Mauricio Walerstein			
La Quema de Judas	Román Chalbaud	Miguel Ángel Landa, Hilda Vera, Rafael Briceño	Drama	9th Moscow International Film Festival nominee: Grand Prize
1976
Compañero Augusto	Enver Cordido	Orlando Urdaneta, María Grazia Bianchi, Rafael Cabrera, Jesús Maella, Julio Mota, Chelo Rodríguez	Drama	
Soy un delincuente	Clemente de la Cerda	Haydée Balza		Special Jury Prize at 1977 Locarno International Film Festival
1977
El Cine Soy Yo	Luis Armando Roche	Asdrúbal Meléndez, Juliet Berto, Alvaro Roche	Drama	Entered into the 10th Moscow International Film Festival
El Pez que Fuma	Román Chalbaud	Hilda Vera, Orlando Urdaneta, Haydée Balza, Miguel Ángel Landa	Comedy / drama	
Los Tracaleros	Alfredo Lugo	Orlando Urdaneta, Elluz Peraza, Toco Gómez	Comedy / drama	
Panamá	Jesús Enríque Guédez			
Se llamaba SN	Luis Correa	Asdrúbal Meléndez, José Torres, María Gracia Bianchi, Pedro Marthan, Ricardo Blanco	Historical	
Se solicita muchacha de buena presencia y motorizado con moto propia	Alfredo Anzola			
1978
Carmen, la que contaba 16 años	Román Chalbaud	Mayra Alejandra, Miguel Ángel Landa, Carlos Márquez	Drama	
El cabito	Daniel Oropeza	Carlos Carrera, Chony Fuentes, Gabriel Martínez, Hermelinda Alvarado, María Grazia Bianchi, Oscar Ibarra		
La empresa perdona un momento de locura	Mauricio Walerstein	Simón Díaz, Eva Mondolfi, Asdrúbal Meléndez, Iván Feo	Comedy	Screened at the 1979 Cannes Film Festival.
Yo hablo a Caracas	Carloz Azpurúa		Documentary	
1979
Bodas de papel	Román Chalbaud			
Bolívar, sinfonía tropikal	Diego Rísquez			
El rebaño de los ángeles	Román Chalbaud	Mary Soliani, Pilar Romero, Alicia Plaza	Fiction	
Manuel	Alfredo Anzola	Víctor Cuica, Alejo Felipe, Asdrúbal Meléndez, Julio Mota, Virginia Urdaneta		
País Portátil	Iván Feo	Alejandra Pinedo, Héctor Duvauchelle, Iván Feo	Fiction	Film based on the novel of the same name by Adriano González León
Simplicio	Franco Rubartelli	Guillermo Montesinos, David Lares, Luis Salazar, Antonio Rodríguez		
Trampa inocente	Oziel Rodríguez	Bienvenido Roca, José Torres, Hilda Vera, María Fernanda di Giacobbe, Arturo Calderón		
Travelling Companion	Clemente de la Cerda			Entered into the 11th Moscow International Film Festival

== 1980s ==
Title	Director	Cast	Genre	Notes
1980
Historias de amor y brujería	Carlo Cosmi			
1981
La Propia Gente	Carlos Azpúrua, Carlos Oteyza, Jacobo Penzo		Documentary	
1982
Cangrejo	Román Chalbaud	Miguel Ángel Landa, América Alonso, Carlos Márquez	Drama	Based on the book Cuatro Crímenes: Cuatro Poderes, by Fermín Mármol León
Domingo de resurrección	César Bolívar			
Los Criminales	Clemente de la Cerda			
Menudo: La Película	Alfredo Anzola		Documentary	
The Wedding (La Boda)	Thaelman Urguelles			
1983
La Gata Borracha	Román Chalbaud			
The House of Water	Jacobo Penzo			
1984
Adiós Miami	Antonio Llerandi			
Cangrejo II	Román Chalbaud	Miguel Ángel Landa, Jean Carlo Simancas, Toco Gómez		
Cóctel de camarones	Alfredo Anzola	Adriana Villalba, Alba Roversi, Alejandro Corona	Comedy	
Homicidio culposo	César Bolívar	Elba Escobar, Javier Vidal, Jean Carlos Simancas	Drama	
La hora del tigre	Alfredo Lugo			
La muerte insiste	Javier Blanco			Based in the novel L'Assassin maladroit by René Reouven
Macho y hembra	Mauricio Walerstein			
Morituri	Philippe Toledano			
1985
Oriana	Fina Torres	Doris Wells, Maya Oloe	Drama	Won the Golden Camera Award at the 1985 Cannes Film Festival
Ratón de ferretería	Román Chalbaud	Miguel Ángel Landa, Jenny Noguera, Rafael Briceño		
Más allá del silencio	César Bolívar	Maria Isabel Calderón, Julie Restifo, Ileanna Simancas		
Agonia	Joseph Novoa	Maria Eugenia Carrasco, Aminta de Lara Aminta de Lara. Jorge Díaz, Juan Manuel Montesinos	Drama	
1986
Ifigenia	Iván Feo	Marialejandra Martín, Adriano González León, Vilma Ramia	Drama	
Pequeña revancha	Olegario Barrera Monteverde			Nominated for the 1st Goya Awards as Best Iberoamerican Film.
1987
Macu, The Policeman's Woman	Solveig Hoogesteijn	Daniel Alvarado, María Luisa Mosquera, Ana Castell	Drama	
La oveja negra	Román Chalbaud	Eva Blanco, Arturo Calderón, Javier Zapata	Drama	

== 1990s ==
Title	Director	Cast	Genre	Notes
1990
Cuchillos de fuego	Román Chalbaud	Miguel Ángel Landa Dora Mazzone Jonathan Montenegro		
El corazón en las tinieblas	Román Chalbaud	Jacques Spiesser, María Cristina Lozada, Alejo Felipe, Manuelita Selwer	Drama	
1991
Jericó	Luis Alberto Lamata	Cosme Cortázar	Drama	Goya Award nominee: Best Spanish Language Foreign Film
Terra Nova	Calogero Salvo	Marisa Laurito, Antonio Banderas, Mimí Lazo	Drama	
1992
Desnudo con Naranjas	Luis Alberto Lamata	Lourdes Valera & Daniel Alvarado	Drama	Sochi International Film Festival winner: Best Actor Daniel Alvarado
Río Negro aka Blak River	Atahualpa Lichy	Ángela Molina, Marie-José Nat, Nathalie Nell, Fanny Bastien, Frank Ramírez, Daniel Alvarado	Drama	Coral Prize to the Best Unpublished Script - Havana Festival, India Catalina Opera Prima - Cartagena Festival, Makhila to the Opera Prima - Biarritz Festival.
Santera	Solveig Hoogesteijn	Gledys Ibarra, Irma Salcedo	Drama	Gramado Film Festival nominee – Latin Competition: Best Film
1993
Los Platos del Diablo	Thaelman Urgelles	Gustavo Rodríguez, Mimí Lazo, Marcela Walerstein	Drama	Film based on the novel of the same name, by Eduardo Liendo
1994
Condeneitor	Ramón Tovar	Benjamín Rausseo, Azabache, Wilmer Ramírez	Comedy	Mockbuster, parody of The Terminator
Golpes a mi Puerta	Alejandro Saderman	Verónica Oddó & Elba Escobar	Drama	Goya Award nominee: Best Spanish Language Foreign Film
1995
Bésame mucho	Philippe Toledano	Amparo Grisales, Ruddy Rodríguez, Gustavo Rodríguez, Antonio Drija, Honorato Magaloni, Athenea Klioumí	Drama	
Mecánicas Celestes	Fina Torres	Ariadna Gil	Comedy	L.A. Outfest winner: Grand Jury Award for Outstanding American Narrative Feature
Rosa de Francia	César Bolívar	Ninibeth Leal, Víctor Cámara	Drama	
Sicario	Joseph Novoa	Laureano Olivares, Gledys Ibarra, Pedro Lander	Drama	Tokyo International Film Festival winner: Best Director & Best Supporting Actress
1996
Out in the Open	Luis Armando Roche	Roy Dupuis, Christian Vadim, Carlos Cruz	Drama	
Tokyo-Paraguaipoa	Leonardo Henríquez	Adolfo Cubas, Eileen Abad, Kenji Sato	Action / drama	
1997
La primera vez	Luis Alberto Lamata	Servando Primera, Florentino Primera	Drama Musical	
Una Vida y Dos Mandados	Alberto Arvelo	John Márquez, Bernardino Angel	Drama	Montréal World Film Festival nominee: Grand Prix des Amériques
Pandemonium: La Capital del Infierno	Román Chalbaud	Orlando Urdaneta, Amalia Pérez Díaz	Drama	San Sebastián International Film Festival nominee: Golden Seashell Award
La Voz del Corazón	Carlos Oteyza	Henry Soto, Beatriz Valdez, Asdrúbal Meléndez	Drama	Gramado Film Festival nominee: Best Film
1998
100 años de perdón	Alejandro Saderman	Orlando Urdaneta, Elluz Peraza, Mariano Álvarez, Daniel Lugo & Aroldo Betancourt	Comedy	Newport International Film Festival nominee: Jury Award
Amaneció de golpe	Carlos Azpúrua	Ruddy Rodríguez, Yanis Chimaras, Elba Escobar	Drama	Goya Award nominee: Best Spanish Language Foreign Film
Piel	Oscar Lucién	Indhira Serrano, Gabriel Blanco, Juan Manuel Montesinos	Drama	Bogotá Film Festival nominee: Best Film
1999
Huelepega: Ley de la Calle	Elia Schneider	José Gregorio Rivas, Pedro Lander, Adolfo Cubas	Drama	
Loop	Julio Sosa Pietri	Jean Carlo Simancas	Drama	Venezuelan entry for the Best Foreign Language Film at the 71st Academy Awards

== 2000s ==
Title	Director	Cast	Genre	Notes
2000
Caracas Amor a Muerte	Gustavo Balza	Luis Fernández, Iván Tamayo	Drama	Los Angeles Latino International Film Festival winner: Best Film
Cédula Ciudadano	Diego Velasco	Héctor Palma, Luis Colmenares, Dimas González, Rolando Padilla, Benjamin Rausseo, Orlando Urdaneta	Comedy	
Manuela Sáenz	Diego Rísquez	Beatriz Valdés, Mariano Álvarez	Drama	
Borrón y Cuenta Nueva	Henrique Lazo	Mimí Lazo, Luis Fernández, Elba Escobar	Comedy	Cartagena Film Festival nominee: Best Film
Oro Diablo	Joseph Novoa		Drama	
2002
The Archangel's Feather	Luis Manzo	Iván Tamayo, Roque Valero, Elaiza Gil, Alejo Felipe	Drama	
2003
B-Happy	Gonzalo Justiniano	Manuela Martelli, Eduardo Barril, Lorene Prieto, Felipe Ríos, Ricardo Fernández	Drama	Winner: CICAE Award - Best Film
Una casa con vista al mar	Alberto Arvelo	Imanol Arias, Leandro Arvelo	Drama	Miami Film Festival winner: Best Director
Yotama se va volando	Luis Armando Roche	Edgar Ramírez, Beatriz Vásquez	Drama	Cartagena Film Festival nominee: Best Film
2004
Punto y Raya	Elias Schneider	Roque Valero, Edgar Ramírez	Action / drama / comedy	Bogotá Film Festival winner: Best Director
X-Ray of a Lie	Wolfgang Schalk		Documentary	
Habana, Havana	Alberto Arvelo	Raúl Eguren, Israel Guerra	Drama	Cartagena Film Festival nominee: Best Film
2005
Secuestro Express	Jonathan Jakubowicz	Mia Maestro, Jean Paul Leroux, Carlos Julio Molina, Ruben Blades, Niga Sibilino & Budu	Drama	British Independent Film Award nominee: Best Foreign Film
1888, El Extraordinario Viaje de la Santa Isabel	Alfredo Anzola	Marco Villarubia, Elba Escobar	Drama	ANAC Awards: Best Art Direction & Best Cinematography
El Caracazo	Román Chalbaud	Fernando Carrillo, Yanis Chimaras, Mimí Lazo, Francis Rueda	Drama	ANAC Awards: Best Supporting Actress (Beatriz Vásquez)
Maroa	Solveig Hoogesteijn	Tristán Ulloa, Yorlis Domínguez, Elba Escobar	Drama	Venezuela's Official Selection for the 79th Academy Awards for Best Foreign Language Film
2006
13 segundos	Freddy Fadel	Gabriela Vergara, Lourdes Valera, Daniela Alvarado, Víctor Cámara, Roberto Lamarca	Drama	
El Don	Joseph Novoa	Laureno Olivares	Drama, Accion	
Elipsis	Eduardo Arias-Nath	Édgar Ramírez, Seu Jorge, Jean Paul Leroux	Drama / crime	
Francisco de Miranda	Diego Rísquez	Luis Fernández	History / drama	
Mi Vida por Sharon, ¿o qué te pasa a ti?	Carlos Azpúrua	Mimi Lazo, Carlos Mata, Vicente Tepedino	Comedy	
Tocar y Luchar	Alberto Arvelo	José Antonio Abreu, Gustavo Dudamel	Documentary	Miami Film Festival: Best Documentary
2007
13 Segundos	Freddy Fadel	Daniela Alvarado, Carmen Julia Álvarez, Nohely Arteaga	Drama	
El Señor Presidente	Rómulo Guardia		Drama	Adaptation of the 1946 homonymous novel by Guatemalan writer Miguel Ángel Asturias
Puras Joyitas	César Oropeza	Mario Cimarro, Miguel Ferrari, Erich Wildpret	Action / comedy	
Una abuela virgen	Olegario Barrera	Daniela Alvarado, Antonio Delli, Marlene De Andrade, Iván Tamayo	Comedy	
Cyrano Fernandez	Alberto Arvelo	Edgar Ramirez, Pastor Oviedo, Jessika Grau	Action / romance	Malaga Film Festival; Best Latin American Film
Postcards from Leningrad	Mariana Rondon	Laureano Olivares, Greisy Mena	Drama / tragicomedy	Biarritz Film Festival winner; Goya Awards: Best Spanish Language Foreign Film nominee
2008
Bloques	Carlos Caridad, Alfredo Hueck	Dimas González, Lourdes Valera, Nohely Arteaga	Drama	
The Color of Fame	Alejandro Ballame	Elaiza Gil, Alberto Alifa, Miguel Ferrari	Drama	
La Virgen Negra	Ignacio Castillo Cotin	Carmen Maura, Matheus Nachtergaele, Carolina Torres	Comedy	
A mi me gusta	Ralph Kinnard	Mónica Pasqualotto, Jonathan Ashford	Romance / comedy	
2009
Día naranja	Alejandra Szeplaki	Carolina Riveros, Bernarda Pagés, Martina García	Comedy	Venezuelan, Colombian and Argentinean co-production
Libertador Morales, el Justiciero	Efterpi Charalambidis	Rafael Gil, Alba Vallvé	Comedy	
Swing con son	Rafael Marziano Tinoco	Caridad Canelón, Billo Frómeta, Rafa Galindo, Alberto Naranjo, María Rivas	Documentary / history / musical	
Un lugar lejano	José Ramón Novoa	Erich WildpretMirela Mendoza, Tristán Ulloa	Drama	
Venezzia	Haik Gazarian	Alfonso Herrera, Ruddy Rodríguez	Drama	
Zamora: Tierra y hombres libres	Román Chalbaud	Alexander Solórzano, Eric Ekvall, Antonio Machuca	Historical	

== 2010s ==
Title	Director	Cast	Genre	Notes
2010
Cheila: Una Casa Pa' Maita	Eduardo Barberena	Endry Cardeño, Violeta Alemán, José Manuel Suárez	Drama	Best Movie at the Mérida Film Festival
Habana Eva	Fina Torres	Prakriti Maduro, Juan Carlos García	Comedy	Best Movie at the New York Latino Film Festival
Hermano	Marcel Rasquin	Eliú Armas, Fernando Moreno	Drama	Best Movie at the Moscow Film Festival; Oscar submission for Best Foreign Language Film
Taita Boves	Luis Alberto Lamata	Juvel Vielma, Daniela Alvarado, Gledys Ibarra	Historical	
La Hora Cero	Diego Velasco	Zapata 666, Amanda Key, Erich Wildpret, Nana Ponceleon, Albi de Abreu, Antonio Cuevas, Marisa Roman	Action	
El Chico que Miente	Marite Ugas	Iker Fernandez, Francisco Denis, Beatriz Vazquez, Gladys Prince, Aldrin Sterling	Drama	
Yours	Ivan Mazza	Albi De AbreuArmando CabreraPrakriti Maduro	Short	
2011
Patas Arriba	Alejandro García Wiedemann	Gonzalo Camacho, Lourdes Valera, Michelle García, Erich Wildpret, Marialejandra Martín	Comedy	
No Stingray Pie for Dinner Tonight	Braulio Rodríguez	Luis Carreño	Comedy short	
Reverón	Diego Rísquez	Luigi Sciamanna, Sheila Monterola, Luis Fernández, Prakriti Maduro	Drama	Best Movie at the Mérida Film Festival
Último cuerpo	Carlos Daniel Malavé	William Goite, Miguel Ferrari, Jean Paul Leroux, Mercedes Brito, Guillermo Canache	Mystery	
Yo, indocumentada	Andrea Baranenko	Tamara Adrián	Documentary	Represented Venezuela and was part of the 2013 official selection of the United Nations Association Film Festival (UNAFF).
2012
Breach in the Silence	Luis Rodríguez, Andrés Rodríguez			
Caracas, las dos caras de la vida	Jackson Gutiérrez			
El manzano azul	Olegario Barrera	Miguel Ángel Landa, Gabriel Mantilla, Rosario Prieto, Marisa Román, Albi De Abreu	Children film	
El Misterio de las Lagunas, Fragmentos Andinos	Atahualpa Lichy		Documentary	
Pipí Mil Pupú 2 Lucas	Enrique R. Bencomo Fernando R. Bencomo		Action Comedy	
Rock, Paper, Scissors	Hernán Jabes		Drama	
Tiempos de dictadura	Carlos Oteyza		Documentary	Film about the dictatorship of Marcos Pérez Jiménez
2013
Alt	Alejandro Hernández	Edmary Fuentes Gustavo Finol	Short	
Bad Hair	Mariana Rondón	Beto Benites		
Bolívar, Man of Difficulties	Luis Alberto Lamata	Roque Valero	Historical	
Caracas, Te Quiero Que Jode	Various directors		Anthology	
El Diario de Bucaramanga	Carlos Alberto Fung	Simón Pestana, Ana Karina Casanova	Historical	
Galus Galus	Clarissa Duque		Short	
High Noon	Ivan Mazza	Gabriel Rojas, Pedro Gómez, Prakriti Maduro, Edgar Noria, Efraín Romero, Gustavo Santana	Short	
The Liberator	Alberto Arvelo		Historical	Venezuelan entry for the Best Foreign Language Film at the 87th Academy Awards, making the January Shortlist.
Jacinto Convit	Sergio Monsalve		Documentary	
La distancia más larga	Claudia Pinto	Carme Elias, Omar Moya, Ivan Tamayo	Drama	Nominated for Best Spanish Language Foreign Film at the 29th Goya Awards.
La pura mentira	Carlos Malavé	Mariaca Semprún, Ernesto Calzadilla, Gigi Zanchetta, Jesús Cervo	Comedy	
Papita, maní, tostón	Luis Carlos Hueck		Comedy	Highest-grossing film in the history of Venezuelan cinema.
The House at the End of Time	Alejandro Hidalgo	Ruddy Rodríguez	Horror	Highest-grossing film in the history of Venezuelan cinema and the most internationally distributed Venezuelan film.
The Return	Patricia Ortega	Daniela González, Sofía Espinoza, Laureano Olivares, Jessica González	Drama	
Valle Cocodrilo	Leticia Patrizi		Short	
2014
Blue and Not So Pink	Miguel Ferrari	Guillermo García, Nacho Montes (aka Ignacio Montes González), Hilda Abrahamz, Carolina Torres, Alexander Da Silva, Sócrates Serrano, Elba Escobar, Beatriz Valdés	Drama	Best Foreign Film in the Spanish Language at the 28th Goya Awards in 2014
Corpus Christi	César Bolívar	Carlos Cruz, Jariana Armas, Marcos Moreno		
2015
El desertor	Raúl Chamorro	Magdiel González, Eliane Chipia, Leónidas Urbina, Glenda Mendoza, Mercedes López, Salvador Villegas	Drama	
El malquerido	Diego Rísquez	Chyno Miranda	Drama	
From Afar	Lorenzo Vigas		Drama	Golden Lion at the 72nd Venice International Film Festival. It was selected as the Venezuelan entry for the Best Foreign Language Film at the 89th Academy Awards.
Gone with the River				
Km 72	Samuel Henríquez	Gustavo Rodríguez, Frank Spano, George Akram, Indra Santamaría, Jesús Nunes	Cine Negro	
Muerte Suspendida	Óscar Rivas Gamboa	Zapata 666 Mayra Africano Asdrúbal Blanco Óscar Pérez	Action	
2016
CAP 2 Intentos	Carlos Oteyza		Documentary	Film about the two non-consecutive tenures of President Carlos Andrés Pérez.
El Amparo	Rober Calzadilla	Giovanny García Vicente Quintero Samantha Castillo Vicente Peña Rossana Hernández	Historical	
La Soledad	Jorge Thielen Armand	Jose Dolores López, Adrializ López, Jorge Roque Thielen	Drama	Premiered at the 73rd Venice International Film Festival
Luisa	Juan Carlos Wessolossky	Carlos Mata, Eliana López	Drama	
Tamara	Elia Schneider	Luis Fernández, Prakriti Maduro, Mimí Lazo, Karina Velásquez, Carlota Sosa, Julie Restifo, Tamara Adrián	Drama Romance	
2017
El Inca	Ignacio Castillo Cottin		Sports Drama	
In the Shadow of the Revolution	J. Arturo Albarrá Clifton Ross		Documentary	
The Family	Gustavo Rondón Córdova		Drama	
2018
Being Impossible	Patricia Ortega		Drama	
Chavismo: The Plague of the 21st Century	Gustavo Tovar-Arroyo		Documentary	Best documentary in the New York International Films Infest Festival.
El pueblo soy yo	Carlos Oteyza	Enrique Krauze, Fernando Mires, Loris Zanatta, Alberto Barrera Tyszka, Ana Rosa Torres	Documentary	Nominated in the 34th Guadalajara International Film Festival for the feature-length documentary category.
Misión H2O	Álvaro Cáceres	Melanie Henríquez, Manuel Bastos, Laura de la Uz	Animated	
Muerte en Berruecos	Caupolicán Ovalles	Luis Gerónimo Abreu	Historical	
They Call Us Warriors	Jennifer Socorro David Alonso Edwin Corona Ramos		Documentary	
Simón	Diego Vicentini	Christian McGaffney, Kelley Mack, Steve Wilcox, Alexandra Hoover	Short	Feature film produced.
2019
Colateral	Lucrecia Cisneros		Documentary	
Infection	Flavio Pedota	Rubén Guevara, Leonidas Urbina, Magdiel González, Genna Chanelle Hayes	Horror	Best Ibero-American Film award at the 2019 Guadalajara International Film Festival.
La noche de las dos lunas	Miguel Ferrari	Prakriti Maduro, Mariaca Semprún, Luis Gerónimo Abreu, Albi De Abreu	Drama	

== 2020s ==
Title	Director	Cast	Genre	Notes
2020
A La Calle	Maxx Caicedo Nelson G. Navarrete		Documentary	
Atacama	Enrique Bencomo	Loreto Dañobeitia Egaña, David Alonso, Mariajesus Foix, Jose Miguel Ceardi, Luciano Farías, German Silva		
La Fortaleza	Jorge Thielen Armand	Jorge Roque Thielen, Yoni Naranjo, Carlos Medina, Leudys Naranjo	Drama	Nominated for Tiger Award at the 2020 International Film Festival Rotterdam.
Lejos de casa: éxodo venezolano	Abner Ramírez	Gabriel Buitrago, Abner Ramirez, Yroski Palacios	Drama	
El Father Plays Himself	Mo Scarpelli	Jorge Thielen Armand, Jorge Roque Thielen	Documentary	51st Visions du Réel International Competition Special Mention Winner. In Co-production with the UK, Italy, and the US.
Once Upon a Time in Venezuela	Anabel Rodríguez Ríos		Documentary	Venezuelan entry for the Best International Feature Film at the 93rd Academy Awards.
Opposite Direction	Alejandro Bellame Palacios	Claudia Rojas, Christian González, Erick Palacios, Diana Volpe, Alberto Alifa	Romance	Candidate for the 36th Goya Awards for the Best Ibero-American Film category.
The Inner Glow	Andrés Eduardo Rodríguez		Drama	Venezuelan entry for the Best International Feature Film at the 94th Academy Awards.
Two Autumns in Paris	Gibelys Coronado	María Antonieta Hidalgo, Francisco Villarroel, Raúl Amundaray, Sonia Villamizar, Juan Belgrave	Drama Political Thriller	Special Jury Prize at the Nigeria Film Festival and several International awards
2021
La última pieza	Ricardo Muñoz Senior	Ricardo Muñoz Senior, Samantha Castillo, Victor Oliveira	Drama Comedy	
Me & The Beasts	Nico Manzano	Jesús Nunes	Drama Musical	
Rómulo Resiste	Carlos Oteyza	Américo Martín, Elisa Lerner, Ramón Guillermo Aveledo	Documentary	
The Box	Lorenzo Vigas	Hernán Mendoza, Hatzín Navarrete, Cristina Zulueta	Drama	Venezuelan entry for the Best International Feature Film at the 95th Academy Awards.
2022
Free Color	Alberto Arvelo Mendoza	Carlos Cruz-Diez	Documentary	
Jezebel	Hernán Jabes	Gabriel Agüero, Johanna Juliethe, Eliane Chipia, Shakti Maal	Thriller Crime	
2023
My Otaku Girlfriend	Edio Raven	Miguelángel Hidalgo, Karla Scallop, Frank Coello, Subotic Kelliens	Drama	
The Rent Girl	Carlos Caridad Montero	Daniela Alvarado, Luis Olavarrieta, Patricia Schwarzgruber, Agustín Segnini, Augusto Nitti, César Bencid	Romantic comedy	Premiered on June 1, 2023.
The Shadow of the Sun	Miguel Ángel Ferrer	Carlos Manuel González, Anyelo López, Greisy Mena, Jeizer Ruiz, Richard Clark, Davis Olaves, Camila Curtis, Pedro Alonso, Kenny Montoya	Drama	Venezuelan entry for the Best International Feature Film at the 96th Academy Awards
The Cage	Jose Salaverria	Juvel Vielma, Leonidas Urbina, Karina Velasquez, Ananda Troconis	Sci fi	
Simón	Diego Vicentini	Christian McGaffney	Drama	Best Feature Film at the Venezuelan Film Festival.
Upon Entry	Alejandro Rojas Juan Sebastián Vásquez	Alberto Ammann, Bruna Cusí, Ben Temple, Laura Gómez	Drama	Shooting in Spaon
Back to Life	Luis Carlos Hueck Alfredo Hueck	José Ramón Barreto, José Roberto Díaz, Crisol Carabal	Comedy-drama	
2024
Azotes 2	Jackson Gutierrez	Jorge Reyes	Thriller	
Hambre	Joanna Nelson	Gabriel Aguero, Rolando Padilla	Drama	
Los herederos	Pablo De La Barra	Javier Vidal	Thriller	
Lost Chapters	Lorena Alvarado	Ena Alvarado, Ignacio Alvarado, Adela Rodríguez	Drama	
Un Mar De Libertad	Carmen Monteverde	Juvel Vielma, Asdrubal Blanco	History	
Visceral	Cesar Manzano	Irene Esser, Jose Ramon Barreto	Drama	
Zafari	Mariana Rondón	Daniela Ramírez, Francisco Denis, Samantha Castillo, Varek La Rosa, Alí Rondón, Beto Benites, Claret Quea, Juan Carlos Colombo	Black comedy, Drama, Dystopia	Nominated - Horizontes Latinos Award at the 72nd San Sebastián International Film Festival Winner - FBAL Award for Feature Film from the French Union of Film Critics at the 33rd Biarritz Film Festival Nominated - Best International Film at the 29th International Film Festival of Kerala Nominated - Grand Prix at the 39th Fribourg International Film Festival Nominated - CineRebels Award at the 42nd Munich International Film Festival Nominated - Trophy Spondylus at the 29th Lima Film Festival Nominated - Chilean Film Competition for Best Film at the 21st Santiago International Film Festival An international co-production with Venezuela, Peru, Mexico, France, Chile, the Dominican Republic and Brazil It was commercially released on September 4, 2025 in Venezuelan theaters
2025
Aún es de noche en Caracas	Mariana Rondón	Natalia Reyes	Drama	
Caimanes De La Galaxia	Ignacio Marquez	Vito Lonardo	Drama	
Creer o Morir	Kiko Lobos	Rolando Padilla, Jose Roberto Diaz	Drama	
Un Viaje De Pelicula	Carlos Daniel Alvarado	Jose Ranib Barreto, Karla Vieira, Rolando Padilla, Carlos Manuel Gonzalez, Pedro Medina	Adventure/ Conedy	
El extraordinario viaje del dragón	Kaori Flores Yonekura	Kaori Flores Yonekura, Yoshitomi Furuya	Documentary	Venezuela's candidate for the 40th Goya Awards as Best Ibero-American Film.
El Hombre De La Luz	Luis Davila	Juvel Vielma, Leonidas Urbina	Science Fiction	
Tango Bar	Gibelys Coronado	América Zerpa, Ramón Roa, Francisco Villarroel	Drama	Premiered on 21 January at the 10th Rajasthan International Film Festival
2026
La muerte no tiene dueño	Jorge Thielen Armand	Asia Argento, Dogreika Tovar, Jorge Thielen Hedderich	Thriller	

== Upcoming ==
Title	Director	Cast	Genre	Notes
The Smoking Fish	Luis Fernández	Mimí Lazo, Jorge Reyes	Documentary	

== See also ==
- Cinema of Venezuela
- List of South American films
- List of Caribbean films
