= Atacama (disambiguation) =

The Atacama Desert is the most arid desert in the world which is located in Chile.

Atacama may refer to:

== People ==
- Atacama people (Likan Antaí), indigenous people of Chile

== Places ==
- Atacama Region, a first-order administrative division of Chile
- Atacama Province, Chile, a former province of Chile
- Atacama Department, a former department of Bolivia, now in Chile

== Geological formations ==
- Atacama Trench, a oceanic trench running along the west coast of South-America
- Puna de Atacama, a high plateau in the Andes
- Atacama Fault, a system of faults in Chile
- Atacama Lacuna, a intermittent lake on the Saturn moon Titan

== Other ==
- Atacama (plant), a genus of flowering plants with a single species, Atacama nivea
- Atacama border dispute, a territorial dispute between Chile and Bolivia
- Puna de Atacama dispute, a territorial dispute between Chile and Argentina
- Atacama skeleton, a mummified corpse found in the Atacama Desert
- 18725 Atacama, a minor planet
- Atacama (film), a 2020 Venezuelan film
