= Solveig Hoogesteijn =

Venezuelan motion picture writer, producer and director

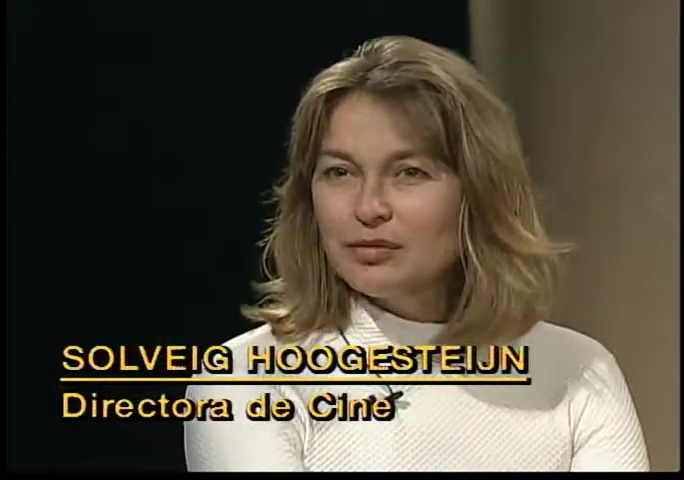
Hoogesteijn on CUNY TV's Charlando con Cervantes, 1997

Solveig Hoogesteijn is a noted Swedish-born Venezuelan motion picture writer, producer and director.

== Film creations ==
She wrote, produced and directed El Mar del tiempo perdido (The Sea of Lost Time, 1981), Manoa (1980), Manoa – Flucht aus der Zeit (The latter film was an adaption for German made-for-TV movie), Deutschland kann manchmal sehr schön sein (Germany can be very beautiful, sometimes, 1982), Macu, la Mujer del Policía (Macu, the Policeman's Woman), Santera.

Hoogesteijn co-wrote, and served as executive producer on the film Maroa, which was Venezuela's Official Selection for the 79th Academy Awards for Best Foreign Language Film in 2007. Her films won 14 International Awards and 20 National Awards. Her second film Manoa participated at the Quinzaine des Realisateurs at the Cannes Film Festival in 1981.

== Personal life ==
Hoogesteijn is the second daughter of a Dutch father and a German mother who migrated to Venezuela in 1947. For more than 30 years her father directed a German-language radio program in Caracas called La Hora Alemana (The German Hour) which addressed all German speaking audiences: Germans, Austrians, Swiss, Czechs, etc.

She studied High School at the Humboldt German School in Caracas. She pursued Art and Literature studies in Venezuela's Universidad Central de Venezuela in Caracas. She then went abroad to study filmmaking between 1971 and 1976 at the University of Television and Film Munich (Hochschule für Fernsehen und Film, München). Hoogesteijn was married to Venezuelan jazz saxophonist, composer and actor Víctor Cuica, who has shared credits in several of her films, being in charge of their music soundtracks and, in some cases, acting in main roles. They have one son.

Her knowledge of European culture and Latin American societies, has defined her task of building bridges between the two continents through culture. Since 2001 she directs a cultural center in Caracas, the Trasnocho Cultural, a private foundation that diffuses culture in all its expressions: film, theater, visual arts, literature, music, gastronomy, history and vanguardist media, becoming the most important cultural centre in Venezuela. Its management model, that relies exclusively on the income of the audience, has marked a new model in cultural management in her country, providing full programmatic liberty in the programming for already 18 years.

== Filmography ==
- 1975: Puerto Colombia
- 1977: El Mar Del Tiempo Perdido (The Sea Of Lost Time)
- 1980: Manoa
- 1980: Manoa - Flucht aus der Zeit (for TV)
- 1982: Deutschland kann manchmal sehr schön sein (Germany Can Be Very Beautiful, Sometimes)
- 1987: Macu, La Mujer Del Policía (Macu, The Policeman's Woman)
- 1994: Santera
- 1999: “En Busca de Humboldt”, (In Search of Humboldt") documentary
- 2005: Maroa

== See also ==
- List of Venezuelan films
