= Arraiz =

Arraiz is a surname. Notable people with the surname include:

- Carlos Arraíz (fl. 1991), Venezuelan actor and model
- Hasier Arraiz (born 1973), Spanish politician

== See also ==
- Luis Arráez (born 1997), Venezuelan baseball player
