= Adriano González León Biennial Novel Prize =

The Adriano González León Biennial Novel Prize (in Spanish, Premio Bienal de Novela Adriano González León) was established in Venezuela 2004 to recognize living novelists who are either Venezuelan nationals residing in any country or foreign nationals residing in Venezuela. The prize was named in honor of the premier living Venezuelan novelist of the time, Adriano González León (1931–2008), the author of País Portátil (1968).

Three organizations collaborated to found the prize: the national branch of the international writers' guild, PEN, the business conglomerate Grupo de Empresas Econoinvest, and the publishing company Grupo Editorial Norma. Criteria for eligibility include that the novel be written in Spanish, has never been published, has never received a literary award, and is not already entered in another literary competition.

== Winners ==
- 2004 - Milton Quero Arévalo for El corrector de estilo
- 2006 - Héctor Bujanda for La última vez
- 2008 - Gustavo Valle

== See also ==
- Guía de Concursos Literarios a private Web site dedicated to all literary prizes
- Infolibro, a private Web page dedicated to all Venezuelan literary prizes
