= Asdrúbal Meléndez =

Venezuelan actor (1935–2025)

Meléndez in 2013

Asdrúbal Meléndez Lugo (Spanish: [azˈðɾuβal meˈlendes ˈluɣo]; November 1, 1935 – July 16, 2025) was a Venezuelan actor.

== Background ==
Meléndez was born on November 1, 1935, in Ojo de Agua, Falcón. He studied at the Juan de Villegas School in Barquisimeto, and graduated as a professor at the Libertador Experimental Pedagogical University, and then of arts in Prague.

Meléndez died on July 16, 2025, at the age of 89.

== Career ==
Meléndez began his career as an actor in the theater during the 1960s, participating in various productions of the Teatro Univesitario, directed at that time by Nicolás Curiel. There he met José Ignacio Cabrujas, Teodoro Petkoff, Gustavo Rodríguez, César Rengifo, Gustavo Machado and Eva Mondolfi, among others, performing at the National Theater.

Throughout his career he was featured in over 60 feature films, including El cine soy yo (1977).

In 1992 he was awarded the National Film Award, in recognition of his outstanding artistic career.
