= Eskimal =

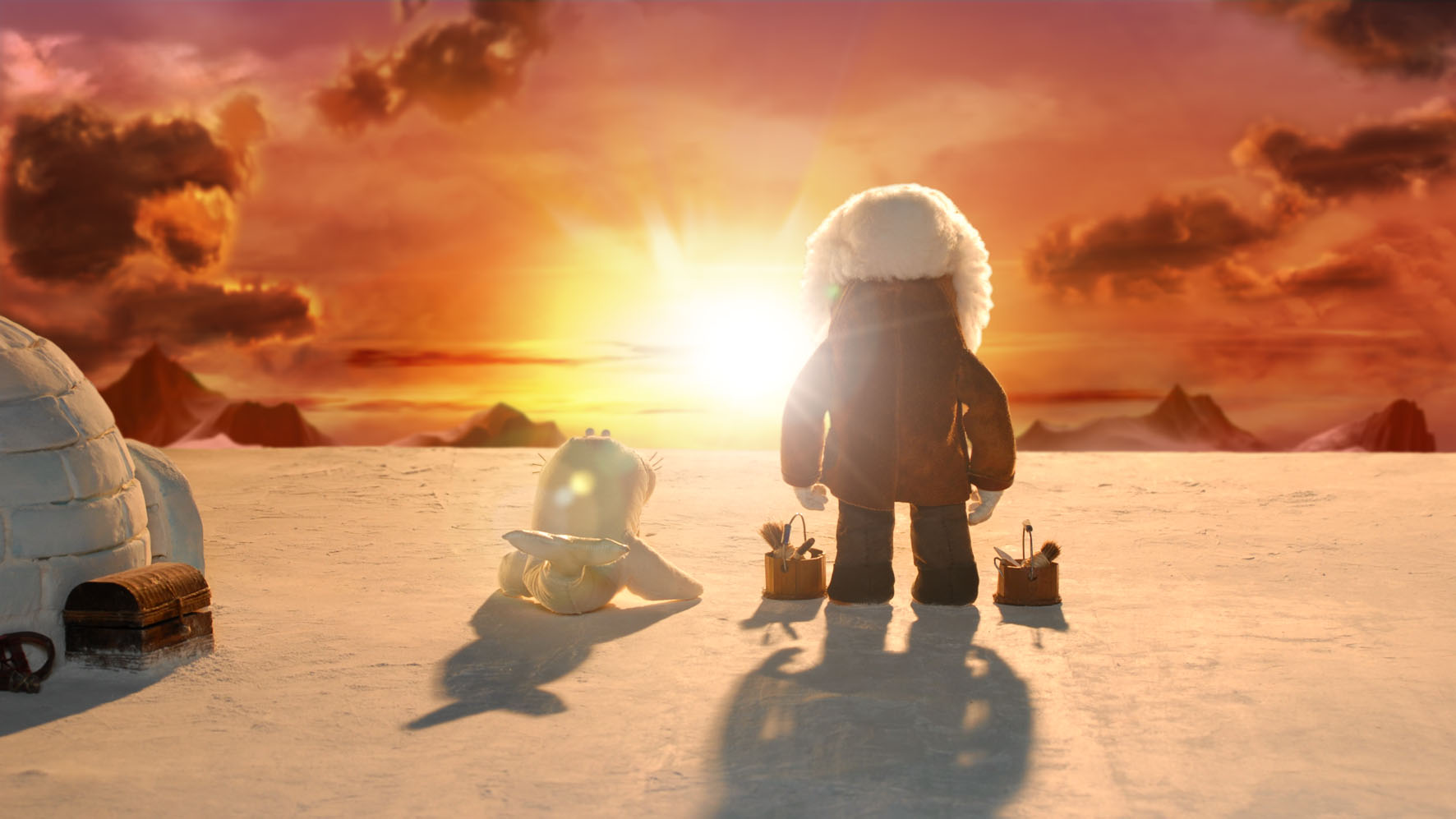
- Directed by: Homero Ramírez Tena
- Written by: Homero Ramírez Tena
- Produced by: IMCINE - CONACULTA; Bajo Cero Films; Universidad Nacional Autónoma de México
- Starring: Mario Martínez; Claudia Acereto
- Music by: César Urbina González
- Release date: 15 November 2011 (Mexico)
- Running time: 8 minutes 48 seconds
- Country: Mexico
- Budget: MX$800,000

Eskimal is a 2011 Mexican short primarily stop motion animated film created by Homero Ramírez Tena. The film is about climate change, specifically melting ice at the poles.

== Synopsis ==
The film is set in a fantastical version of the polar regions that is threatened by pollution. Eskimal and Morsa (the walrus) have to save the Great Glacier.

== Production ==
Making-of video

The film was created as Ramírez's graduation project at the Universidad Nacional Autónoma de México, produced in 2008 with the help of the university television station and the Mexican Film Institute. It was filmed in 2009, and used several techniques to make the plush puppets appear life like, including using reference footage of the action and deep background green screens. There is also some CGI animation used, for example with liquids and to overlay snowdrifts on top of the image. The film won a 2011 grant for postproduction of animated short films, from IMCINE.

== Release ==
Eskimal complete short film

The film was released on Vimeo. It has also been screened at over 100 film festivals around the world, including the Toronto Kids International Film Festival (Canada), Havana International Film Festival (Cuba) and the Festival International du Film D'environnement (Paris), and the Giffoni Film Festival.

== Reception ==
The film has won several international awards, including Best Animated Short at both Sydney Latin American Film Festival (Australia 2012) and at the Margarita Latin American and Caribbean Film Festival (Venezuela 2012). It has also won an environment award.
