= Clase (disambiguation) =

Clase is a suburban district of the City and County of Swansea, Wales falling within the Mynydd-Bach ward.

Clase may also refer to:

- La Clase, 2007 Venezuelan film directed by José Antonio Varela
- Clase 406, 2002 Mexican telenovela on Televisa
- Emmanuel Clase, Dominican baseball player
- Jonatan Clase, Dominican baseball player
