= Women's football in Venezuela =

Football in Venezuela
- Country: Venezuela
- Governing body: Federación Venezolana de Fútbol
- National team: Venezuela

National competitions
- FIFA World Cup

Club competitions
- List: League: Venezuelan Women's Super League; Cups: Copa Libertadores de Fútbol Femenino

Women's football in Venezuela is governed by the Federación Venezolana de Fútbol. Although the sport is growing in popularity many females experience prejudice for playing it.

== National team ==
The women's team of Venezuela has not yet participated in a final phase of the World Cup but has major success at youth levels.

== See also ==
- They Call Us Warriors
