= Er Conde Jones =

- Theatrical release poster
- Directed by: Benjamín Rausseo
- Written by: Benjamín Rausseo
- Produced by: Benjamín Rausseo
- Starring: Benjamín Rausseo; Julie Lima; Honorio Torrealba Jr. Chile Veloz; Rodolfo Drago; Samir Bazzi; Luis Chataing; Erika de la Vega
- Music by: Benjamín Rausseo
- Distributed by: Guacharo's Producciones C.A
- Release date: August 26, 2011
- Running time: 120 minutes
- Country: Venezuela
- Languages: Spanish, English, French, Italian and Portuguese.
- Budget: $11,500 (est.); Bs. 50,000 (est.)
- Box office: $3,579,383; Bs. 15,393,926

Er Conde Jones (Count Jones) is a Venezuelan science-fiction-comedy film written, directed and produced by Venezuelan comedian Bejamín Rausseo, who also is the main protagonist, Count Jones.

The film has, also, special appearances by Venezuelan actors Luis Chataing and Erika de la Vega. Released on August 26, 2011, in Venezuela, the film became one of the most successful national films in Venezuelan history, with, as of the end of 2011, more than 696.000 spectators. It also became the highest-grossing non-foreign film of the year. The film was released on DVD and Blu-ray on December 1, 2011. Also, Rausseo announced a sequel, tentatively named Er Conde Bond.

== Plot ==
The films tells the story of Count Jones (Bejamín Rausseo), a far cousin of Indiana Jones, who is called by the North American government, the Interpol and other international security agencies in order to find a strange mythologic object called "The Crystal Creole Ball", which, if captured by Venezuelan military leader, Er General (Chile Veloz), could lead him to win the upcoming presidential elections.

To find the location of the mythologic ball, Count Jones needed to travel to Paris, Libano, Jordan, Egypt, the United States and finally Venezuela, in which most of the story happens. Throughout the story, Count Jones had to find his niece, Melissa Jones, who is also his love interest, and travel with her and his nephew Goyito (Honorio Torrealba Jr.), who finally betrays Jones and brings the ball to Er General.

== Cast ==
Main actors:

- Bejamín Rausseo as Count Jones (Conde Jones).
- Julie Lima as Melissa Jones.
- Chile Veloz as Er General.
- Rodolfo Drago as Steban.

Supporting actors:

- Honorio Torrealba Jr. as Goyito.
- Iván Romero as Bovy.
- Andreina Yépez as The Captain (El Capitán).
- Romelia Agüero as Melissa's Trainer.
- Carlos Sánchez as Hassan.
- Hector Vargas as The Witcher.
- Roy Díaz as Henri.
- Juan Carlos Barry as The Spiritual Guide.

Guest appearances:

- Erika de la Vega as Agent Karen.
- Luis Chataing as The Priest.
- Samir Bazzi as Samir.
- Joselyn Rodríguez as Princess India.
- Víctor Muñoz as Agent Victor Muñoz.
- Luis "Moncho" Martínez as The Pilot.
- Mario Bresanutti as Agent 'Cocofrío'.
- Paolo Carruzo as Agent Paolo Carruzo.

== Reception ==
=== Box office ===
In Venezuela, the film became a big box office hit. The movie debuted at #3, grossing $465,326 for the weekend of August 26–28, 2011 only behind Cars 2, which grossed $680,206 and The Smurfs, which grossed $481,970. On its second weekend (September 2–4, 2011), the film experimented a 30.6% increase, grossing $607,887 and charted at #2, only behind the debuting Green Lantern, which grossed $625,563. Er Conde Jones was the weekend-leader in attendance, selling 30% more tickets than Green Lantern.

On its third weekend, the film dipped 37.9% and grossed $377,726, staying at #2, behind Green Lantern, which also dipped 31.9% to $425,892 and ahead of the debuting Friends with Benefits, which grossed $270,430;

As of September 11, 2011, the film has grossed a total $2,439,046 in Venezuela, and with 462.283 spectators in 17 days of its run, it became one of the highest-grossing all time Venezuelan film productions.

=== Reviews ===
Er Conde Jones received mixed reception among the press and the spectators. El Universal gave a positive review of the film, stating that "'Count Jones was an absurd Venezuelanized parody [...] watching Rausseo walk on tuxedo and alpargatas through New York streets is the perfect representation of the film. Pure creole in the middle of the so-called Empire."
