= Efterpi Charalambidis =

Venezuelan film director

Efterpi Charalambidis is a Venezuelan film director. Her first feature film, Libertador Morales, el Justiciero, was Venezuela's official submission for the Academy Award for Best International Feature Film in 2009.

== Career ==
Efterpi studied for a master's degree in film arts in 2002 at Columbia University in New York City, United States. Her first short film, Niko's Restaurant, won Best Actor and Best Editing awards at the Columbia University Film Festival in 2001. Charalambidis' second short film, El Chancecito, was filmed in Caracas, Venezuela, and was awarded the New Line Cinema Award for Best Director and the Lifetime Television Award, also Best Director, among others. Her first feature film, Libertador Morales, el Justiciero, was Venezuela's official submission for the Academy Award for Best International Feature Film in 2009, winning the Audience Award and a Special Jury Mention at the 2009 Margarita Latin American and Caribbean Film Festival.

== Filmography ==
- Niko´s Restaurant (short film)
- El Chancecito (short film)
- Libertador Morales, el Justiciero (2009)
- Qué buena broma, Bromelia (2018)
