= Caracas, las dos caras de la vida =

2012 Venezuelan film

- Theatrical release poster
- Directed by: Jackson Gutiérrez
- Release date: 2012
- Country: Venezuela

Caracas, las Dos Caras de la Vida (lit. Caracas, the two faces of life) is a 2012 Venezuelan drama film produced, written and directed by Jackson Gutiérrez. It won two awards at the 2012 Venezuelan Film Festival.

== Cast ==
- Aldrin Sterling
- Jackson Gutiérrez
- Robert García
- Reimer Romero
- Cristian Beltran
- Macsioly Zapata
- Cristina Castillo
- Jencarlos Manzaneda
- Indra Santamaria
- Daniel Geison
- Daniela Alvarado
- Gustavo Camacho
- Jeinner Jaimes

== Awards ==
Award	Category	Result	Nominee	Ref
2012 Venezuelan Film Festival	Best Supporting Actor	Winner	Jackson Gutiérrez	
2012 Venezuelan Film Festival	Special Jury Award	Winner	Caracas, las Dos Caras de la Vida	

== See also ==
- List of Venezuelan films
