= Alejandro Hernández (director) =

Venezuelan film director

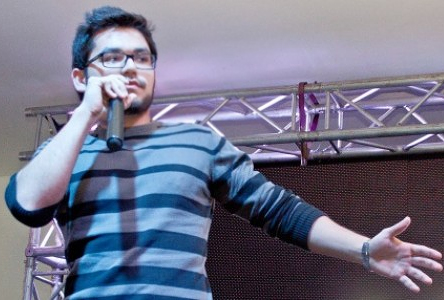
- Born: 28 November 1990 (age 35); Maracaibo, Zulia, Venezuela
- Education: University of Zulia
- Occupations: Film director, writer, humorist, singer-songwriter, film score composer.
- Years active: 2009–present
- Website: alejandro-hernandez.com

Alejandro Manrique Hernández Reinoso (born 28 November 1990 in Maracaibo, Venezuela) is a Venezuelan filmmaker. He achieved popularity in Latin America thanks to The Alejandro Hernández Show, a comedy web series which satirizes Venezuelan and Hispanic culture. Most of the content is in Spanish, although some sketches are recorded in English. Since 2009, his videos have reached a total of over 8 million views, which includes only those on his YouTube account. In 2011 Hernández signed a contract with PlanetaUrbe.Tv. Since then, all of his episodes were uploaded to PlanetaUrbe's website instead of YouTube. After the contract ended, he returned to YouTube through elmostacho.com. Hernández is currently at number 148 on the most followed Twitter users in Venezuela, and is the most followed user in the state of Zulia. He won the Celebrity award at the 2011 Twitter Awards held by El Nacional.

== Career ==
=== Filmmaking and comedy ===
Before creating the YouTube channel, Hernández made several short films in both English and Spanish, such as "Conditioned", a comedy-drama about a nerd who criticizes society and stereotypes. After experimenting, he created his YouTube channel.

Hernández is a successful Venezuelan YouTuber. His first episode, "Cita de salir + el @", which talks about "favorite quotations" on Facebook profiles and the use of the At sign, came to him while he was on Facebook and noticed how they were used the wrong way. Hernández said that the episodic content started with "a few short videos about Facebook and grammatical mistakes", but it later became a more elaborated program. His 18th episode, "Voz orgasmicangelical, profesores necios y la chama que no se calla la jeta", has been his most successful to date, reaching more than 1,000,000 views.

In January 2015 his Sci-Fi short film Alt was released in theaters in Venezuela. Several months after its initial release, it was uploaded to his YouTube channel. The film was subsequently released in other cities such as Argentina and Chile. Alt won Best New Cinema Short at ELCO Film Festival in 2014, was an official selection at the Margarita Latin American and Caribbean Film Festival.

Among his latest projects, The Duplicates is a potential web series shot entirely in Manhattan. After being the subject of human experiments, a man is programmed to live for 100 hours. The only way to reset the timer back to zero is to kill one of his clones. The first episode was uploaded to his official YouTube channel.

Despite the show's success, it has been criticized by the Venezuelan government. Mario Silva, host of La Hojilla, an opinion program that airs on the government channel Venezolana de Televisión, harshly criticized Hernández, saying that he looked "apparently innocent" and labeled him "dangerous" and a bad influence to the Venezuelan youth. However, he pointed out his "perfect English" and "good editing". He even drew comparisons with another Venezuelan comedian, Luis Chataing, which Silva qualified as "stupid".

=== Music and composing ===
"Tamos Ready", a parody song mocking the Reggaeton genre was released on 28 December 2010 along with episode 20. It showed Hernández's music producing and singing abilities. The 1-minute song became a local hit, reaching more than 20,000 digital downloads and positioning both "Alejandro Hernández" and "Tamos Ready" at Twitter's worldwide trending topics.

Hernández generally composes music with mainstream appeal, such as "Take It to the Floor", which was featured on episode 29 as part of a sketch. After many viewers wondered who sang the song, Hernández stated on his Twitter account that it was his own, and had to finish it to be available for download. He also composes orchestral film scores which are usually made for his own short films and specific sketches of his show.

== Personal life ==
Hernández is a native of Maracaibo, and currently resides in New York City. Hernández came out as gay in early 2015 through an open letter on his blog, causing diverse reactions in the Venezuelan media and becoming the first celebrity to publicly state their sexuality in the country.

== Filmography ==
Year	Title	Credit				
Year	Title	director	Producer	screenWriter	Actor	Role
2009	The Alejandro Hernández Show	Yes	Yes	Yes	Yes	Himself
2013	Alt	Yes		Yes		
2015	The Duplicates	Yes	Yes	Yes		
