= Cédula Ciudadano =

2000 Venezuelan film

- Film poster
- Directed by: Diego Velasco
- Written by: Diego Velasco
- Produced by: Gustavo Báez
- Starring: Héctor Palma; Luis Colmenares; Dimas González; Rolando Padilla; Benjamin Rausseo; Orlando Urdaneta
- Cinematography: Francisco González
- Music by: Randy Everett; Carlos Julio Molina; Sam Watson
- Release date: 2000
- Running time: 24 minutes
- Country: Venezuela
- Language: Spanish

Cédula Ciudadano (lit. 'ID Citizen') is a 2000 film directed by Venezuelan filmmaker Diego Velasco.

== Plot ==
Teenager Gustavo Pérez needs to get an official stamp on his identity document in order to avoid the military draft, having to face his country's bureaucracy.

== Cast ==
- Héctor Palma
- Luis Colmenares
- Dimas González
- Rolando Padilla
- Benjamín Rausseo
- Orlando Urdaneta

== Production ==
The film was shot in several places of Caracas, including the old building of El Universal newspaper, the Candelaria Square, La Carlota airbase and the Simón Rodríguez Library. It was partially funded by the Autonomous National Center of Filmmaking (Centro Nacional Autónomo de Cinematografía).

== Awards ==
In 2000 Cédula Ciudadano was awarded as the Best Short Film in the Jackson Crossroads Film Festival, in the Nashville Film Festival and in the Los Angeles Latino International Film Festival. The same year it was also pre-selected for an Academy Awards nomination. In Venezuela, Cédula Ciudadano was received several awards in the 2001 Manuel Trujillo Durán Film Festival, including the Silver Award and for Best Direction, Production and Actor.
