= Condeneitor =

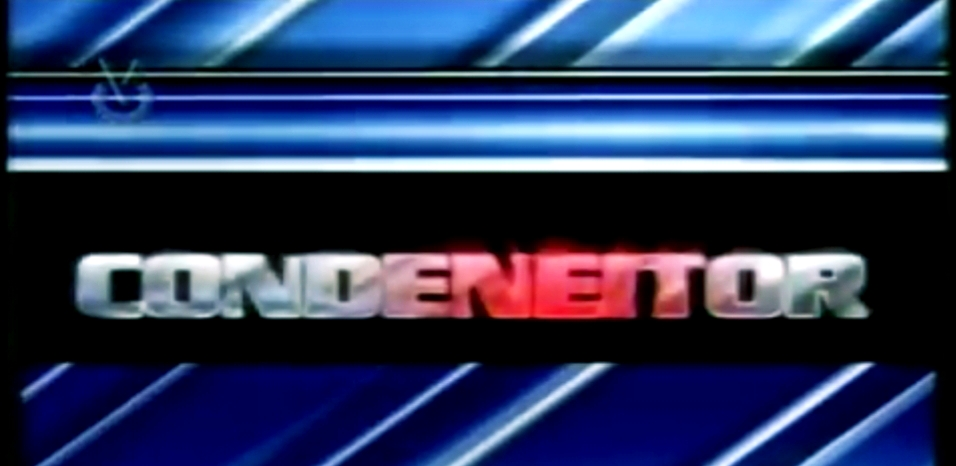
- Directed by: Ramón Tovar
- Starring: Benjamín Rausseo; Azabache; Wilmer Ramírez
- Release date: 1994
- Country: Venezuela
- Language: Spanish

Condeneitor is a 1994 Venezuelan television mockbuster film created and produced by Venevisión and distributed by Cisneros Media. The film is a parody of the 1984 American movie The Terminator and stars comedian Benjamín Rausseo, Wilmer Ramírez and actress Azabache.

== Plot ==
From the future a killer cyborg with the physical characteristics of a human travels to 1994 in order to exterminate Carmen Pérez (Azabache). However, the film takes place in a comic setting.

== Cast ==
- Benjamín Rausseo as Condeneitor (Cyborg / Can Picker).
- Azabache as Carmen Perez (Sarah Connor parody).
- Wilmer Ramírez as Kyle Reese parody.

== Home format ==
The commercial success of Condeneitor prompted distributor Cisneros Media to release the official DVD of the film, which was distributed in Venezuela, the United States and Latin America.

== Legacy ==
As a result of the film's success, several mockbuster and film parodies were also released: Condecop (parody of RoboCop), Tor Gun (parody of Top Gun), Er naufrago (parody of Cast Away) and Er Ersorxista (for The Exorcist), the last two released in 2001. However, they did not have the same success as Condeneitor.
