= Jacinto Convit =

Venezuelan physician and scientist

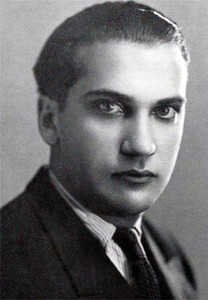
- Born: 11 September 1913; Caracas, Venezuela
- Died: 12 May 2014 (aged 100); Caracas, Venezuela
- Education: Central University of Venezuela (UCV), Caracas, Venezuela
- Known for: Development of anti-leprosy vaccine and studies to cure different cancers
- Spouse: Rafaela Marotta D’Onofrio
- Children: Francisco Convit; Oscar Convit; Antonio Convit; Rafael Convit
- Parent(s): Flora García Marrero (mother); Francesc Convit i Martí (father)
- Awards: Prince of Asturias Award, Technical and Scientific Research (1987); Premio México de Ciencia y Tecnología (1990)

Jacinto Convit García (11 September 1913 – 12 May 2014) was a Venezuelan physician and scientist, known for developing a vaccine to prevent leprosy and his studies to treat cancer. He played a role in founding Venezuela's National Institute of Biomedicine and held many leprosy-related positions. Among Convit's many honors for his work on leprosy and tropical diseases was Spain's Prince of Asturias Award in the Scientific and Technical Research category and France's Legion of Honor. In 1988, Convit was nominated for a Nobel Prize in Medicine for his experimental anti-leprosy vaccine.

== Biography ==
The son of Francesc Convit i Martí, a Spaniard from the region of Catalonia, Spain, who was a naturalized Venezuelan citizen, Jacinto Convit García was born in La Pastora, Libertador Municipality, Caracas in 1913. His mother was Flora García Marrero, a Venezuelan with Canarian roots.

Convit began his studies in the Caracas School and continued in the Andrés Bello lyceum. He was a pupil of Rómulo Gallegos in philosophy and mathematics. Inspired by people with leprosy, he entered medical school at Central University of Venezuela (UCV) in 1932. He earned his title as a Medical Science Doctor in 1938.

Convit began his teaching career in 1940 and was appointed Head of the Dermatology Clinic in 1950. In 1965, his work at the Dermatology Clinic was recognized by the US Board of Dermatology. At the same time, he worked for the Ministry of Health and Social Welfare in Venezuela. He subsequently played a major role in founding the National Institute of Dermatology (now called the National Institute of Biomedicine) in 1972.

In 1968, Convit was elected president of the International Leprosy Association (ILA) and was re-elected in 1973. In 1971, Convit was named by the WHO as Director of the Co-operative Centre for the Study and Histological Classification of Leprosy. In 1976, Convit was elected Director of the Pan American Research and Training in Leprosy and Tropical Diseases. He was also named president of the International Journal of Leprosy.

In 1987, Convit added killed Mycobacterium leprae to the BCG vaccine. The combined vaccine was tested worldwide, but was not more effective than regular BCG. In 1988, the Venezuelan government nominated Convit for a Nobel Prize. A vaccine for leishmaniasis was later developed using Convit's method. He also worked on onchocerciasis, mycosis, and other tropical diseases.

On June 7, 2010, a Venezuelan newspaper incorrectly announced the successful development by Convit of a new cancer vaccine intended to prevent colon, stomach and breast cancer. Venezuela's National Institute of Biomedicine soon published a note clarifying that they have been working for the previous three years on a vaccine against cancer and it is still in development. During this time they have been evaluating a small group of 23 patients, mostly breast cancer and a few of colon, stomach and brain cancers. They have been giving patients an experimental model of immunotherapy against cancer, which have had encouraging results. This vaccine is based on the idea that cancerous cells appear and propagate because the body does not detect them. A sample of the tumour mixed with formalin and BCG marks the malignant cells so the immune system might react and attack the cancer.

=== Death ===
Convit turned 100 in 2013. He died on 12 May 2014. Described as a popular hero, he never charged a patient for the care he gave. Convit published his last study at age 100 in 2013.

== Honours ==
- Legion of Honor (France)
- Prince of Asturias Award (Spain)
- Nobel Prize nomination (1988)
- TWAS Prize (2006)

== In popular culture ==
In 2013 an homonymous documentary film about his life directed by Sergio Monsalve was released. The documentary was screened at the XI Venezuelan Film Festival in 2015.

== See also ==
- Los Notables
