= La Clase =

- Film poster
- Directed by: José Antonio Varela
- Written by: Rafael Antonio; José Antonio Varela; José Luis Varela
- Release date: 2007
- Running time: 90 minutes
- Country: Venezuela
- Language: Spanish

La Clase (English: The [Social] Class) is a 2007 Venezuelan film produced by Venezuela's state-owned Villa del Cine and directed by José Antonio Varela. It is based on the novel of the same name by Farruco Sesto.

La Clase is a romantic drama which contrasts the way of life between the upper and working classes, and one of the most well known projects produced by Villa del Cine. As its title indicates, the film relies on a presentation of class differences.

It won awards at the Film Festivals of Mérida 2008 and Málaga 2009, and an honorific mention at the Iberian American Film and Video Festival Cinesul 2008.
