= Se solicita muchacha de buena presencia y motorizado con moto propia =

1977 Venezuelan film

- Film poster
- Directed by: Alfredo Anzola
- Produced by: Cine Seis Ocho
- Starring: Víctor Cuica; Herman Lejter; Cherry Núñez; José Rodríguez; Otto Rodríguez; Brigitte Tirone; Fausto Verdial
- Production company: PPCA Cine
- Release date: 1977
- Running time: 105 minutes
- Country: Venezuela
- Language: Spanish
- Budget: $300,000

Se solicita muchacha de buena presencia y motorizado con moto propia (English: Wanted: Good Looking Girl with Her Own Motorcycle) is a 1977 film directed by Venezuelan director Alfredo Anzola.

== Cast ==
- Víctor Cuica
- Herman Lejter
- Cherry Núñez
- José Rodríguez
- Otto Rodríguez
- Brigitte Tirone
- Fausto Verdial
