= Libertador Morales, el Justiciero =

- Directed by: Efterpi Charlambidis
- Produced by: Villa del Cine
- Release date: 31 July 2009
- Country: Venezuela
- Language: Spanish

Libertador Morales, el justiciero is a 2009 Venezuelan comedy-drama film produced by the Villa del Cine Foundation and directed by Efterpi Charlambidis, released on 31 July 2009. It was selected as the Venezuelan entry for the Best International Feature Film at the 82nd Academy Awards, but it was not nominated.

== Synopsis ==
The film portrays the Caracas of the time, chaotic and diverse, where immigrants from around the world meet. Libertador Morales, a former policeman who now works as a motorcycle taxi driver, must face the problems of insecurity in his neighborhood and the death of his wife, for which he is to blame. Tired of this reality, he decides to take charge of his future and becomes a justiciero, a kind of vigilante, dressing in black and using his motorcycle to take down local criminals.

== Production ==
The production saw some troubles. It was pre-produced and filmed in 2007, a very rainy year; the number of weeks for filming had to be extended and the schedule changed because of the rain. Post-production began within a week after filming was completed, but this was stalled when Charlambidis' father died at the end of the year. Upon Charlambidis' return to the project, the projected scope of it was reduced so it could be managed; Charlambidis has said that the sound element of post-production was the hardest. Some of the original sound recordings had been lost or were unable to be used because they were ruined by the rain; re-recordings had to take place.

The film's intended release was at the end of 2008, but this was not achieved because of the various struggles. Shortly after this date passed, a fire broke out at the Villa del Cine, which set the production back further.

== Responses ==
Pablo Abraham writes that the film portrays life under the struggling Bolivarian Revolution Venezuela. He suggested that cinema in the 1970s had often depicted the reality of hardships in Venezuela, but that after the government of the Bolivarian Revolution introduced more control over filmmaking, it became hard to depict this reality in cinema. Abraham says that Libertador Morales "should be celebrated" for showing this, but also criticizes that the film does not take the opportunity to provide social criticism.

The character of Libertador Morales has been described as a Robin Hood figure; the director, Charlambidis, explains that Morales is more lawful, saying, "sometimes I say Robin Hood because of the methods he uses, but it is not necessarily stealing from the rich, it is to return things that have been stolen to whom they belong."
