= Creer o Morir =

- Film poster
- Directed by: Kike Villalobos
- Written by: Kike Villalobos
- Produced by: Kike Villalobos
- Starring: Jose Roberto Diaz, Rosario Priero, Rolando Padilla
- Production company: Despertar Studios
- Release date: 2025
- Running time: 100 minutes
- Countries: Venezuela, Spain
- Language: Spanish

Creer o Morir is a 2025 Venezuelan Christian movie created by José Roberto Díaz, Rosario Prieto, Rolando Padilla among others. The film is the first production of Despertar Studios.

The movie tells the history of David, a young boy living with her elderly grandmother in a country with the hardest economical situation.

Creer o Morir had an international release in Cine Capitol on October 26, 2025.

== Plot ==
David, an 8-year-old boy full of joy, charisma, and an unwavering faith in God. Together with his 85-year-old grandmother, Nasha, he faces everyday life in a country marked by adversity. Through his grandmother's perspective and wisdom, he will discover the strength of spirit and the hope that is born even in the most difficult times.

== Cast ==
- José Roberto Diaz
- Rosario Prieto
- Rolando Padilla
- Jorge Roldan
- Omalbi Rojas
- Anneris treco
- Rebeca Oria
- Jeanette Flores

== Production ==
After the COVID-19 pandemic the director Kike Villalobos write the script. In 2024 he funded Despertar Studios and enter the production of the film.

== Release ==
Creer o Morir has an international release in Cinema Capitol of Madrid.

In Bogotá it has a release date of 4 April 2026.

In Venezuela the movie has a domestic release on 30 April 2026.
