= Villa del Cine =

Venezuelan government-funded film and TV production house

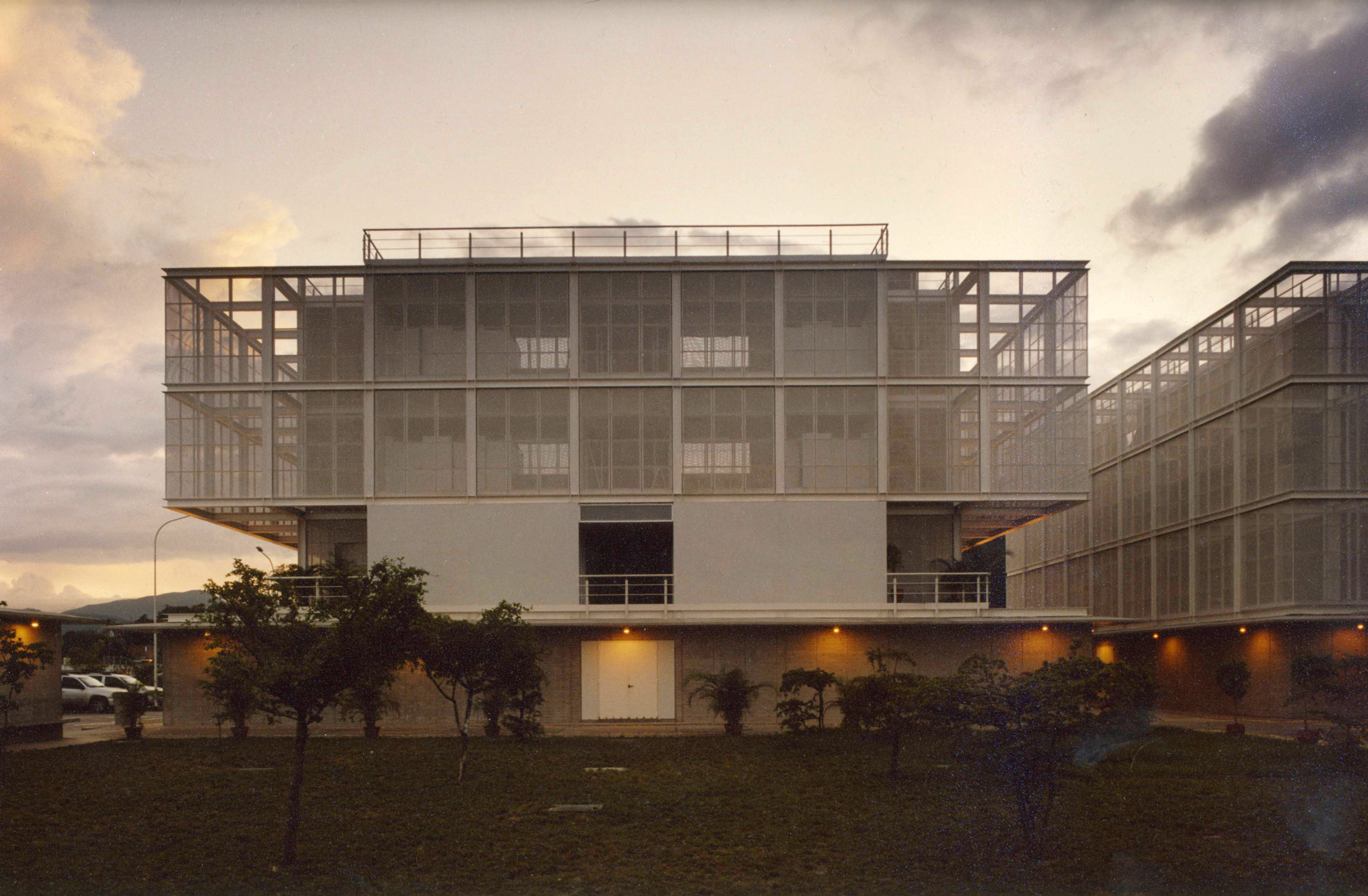
Administrative building of Villa del Cine

Fundación Villa del Cine (English: Cinema City or Cinemaville) is a government-funded Venezuelan film and TV production house that was inaugurated on 3 June 2006 by Venezuelan President Hugo Chávez in the city of Guarenas, near the capital, Caracas.

Villa del Cine is part of the Ministry of Popular Power for Culture and receives funding through its National Autonomous Center of Film (CNAC). According to the pro-Chávez website Venezuelanalysis.com, Villa del Cine is an incentive to increase film production and to enable filmmakers access to materials, equipment and facilities, not just to provide funding. In 2006, the Venezuelan government set up a sister institution, Distribuidora Nacional de Cine Amazonia Films, (Amazonia Films) as an alternative to commercial networks. Amazonia Films distributes the projects created by Villa del Cine and has since acquired films from South America as well as Europe and Asia for the local market.

As of 2012, the president of Villa del Cine is filmmaker José Antonio Varela, who also directed the organization's film La Clase. The executive director of Villa del Cine is Lubezka Luque.

== Aims ==
As of 2006, Hollywood productions comprised 86% of the Venezuelan film market. President Chávez said the aim of Villa del Cine is to counter the lack of an alternative media and to “stimulate, develop, and consolidate the national cinema industry to encourage the Venezuelan people to draw nearer to their values and idiosyncrasies.” At the inauguration of Villa del Cine, Chávez said, "They [Hollywood] inoculate us with messages that have nothing to do with our traditions." Although he said some Hollywood films are "enjoyable", he criticized their portrayal of Native Americans as "savage."

An adviser to the government said, "For a country like Venezuela, it's really the only way to build a cinema infrastructure," noting that several countries, such as Mexico and Brazil, had taken the same route. The director of CNAC, which funds Villa del Cine's projects, said that the aim of Villa del Cine is to facilitate a variety of productions, ranging from short films targeting the youth audience to large cooperative projects in conjunction with the Mercosur trade bloc in the region.

Francisco Sesto, a former minister of culture who also made early contributions to the creation of audio-visual cooperatives in Venezuela, said the aim of Villa del Cine is "the transformation of the state and how people might become participants in the development of film through their own art".

== Organization and facilities ==
Villa del Cine employed 130 as of 2007, is spread over 2,400 square meters (26,000 sq ft), and includes soundproofed studios equipped with lighting, audio and video equipment, casting and wardrobe facilities, and post-production facilities. It is stocked with modern digital film equipment. According to the Venezuelan government, as of 2006, Villa del Cine supported high-definition television and surround sound, and could produce "five films simultaneously".

The complex cost more than US$13 million as of 2007, with a further US$11 million set aside in 2008; Venezuelanalysis.com described it as a US$42 million project as of 2008.

Ville del Cine is part of the Venezuelan government's Plataforma del Cine y el Audiovisual (Film and Audiovisual Platform) of the Minister of Popular Power for Culture. Villa del Cine receives funding for individual projects from the Centro Nacional Autónomo de Cinematografía (CNAC—National Autonomous Center of Film), also under the Minister of Popular Power for Culture, described by Inter Press Service as an "independent film institute". It was founded in 1994 by the Ley de la Cinematografía Nacional (National Law of Cinematography) to promote, protect and encourage Venezuelan cinema, but is now governed by a new National Cinematography Law enacted in 2005, which requires film distributors in Venezuela to show 20% locally made films and also required distributors, broadcasters, pay-TV stations and retailers to pay a tax into the film fund Fonprocine. The Motion Picture Association of America was critical of some of these moves.

== Projects ==
According to Villa del Cine's president, in the four years after its founding the organization made 26 documentary and fictional films and supported even more independent films, with 12 productions scheduled for 2011. Villa del Cine has filmed in all 24 Venezuelan states.

Notable projects funded by the new studio are the story of Francisco de Miranda—a revolutionary who played a key part in events leading to the Venezuelan War of Independence from Spain, which was released in 400 movie theatres and beat Superman Returns to the top of the box office in Venezuela; actor and activist Danny Glover's directorial debut about Toussaint Louverture—leader of the Haitian Revolution; and a short film about Simón Bolívar. There has been controversy over the funding Glover has received for his biopic. Opponents say that the funding for the project outweighs the state budget for domestic films from 2003 to 2008; directors Thaelman Urgelles and the L.A.-based Jonathan Jakubowicz said that the quantity allocated to Glover's project was "excessive". The Culture Minister defended the move since the funding did not come from Villa del Cine's standard funds but from what he called an "additional credit". He added that the funding will not be leaving the country, but will create jobs and provide valuable experience to the relatively youthful studios.

One of the most well-known projects produced by Villa del Cine is the film La Clase ("The [Social] Class"). Directed by José Antonio Varela in 2007, it is a romantic drama which contrasts the lifestyles of the upper and working classes. Varela became the President of Villa del Cine in March 2010, three years after the release of La Clase.

== Visits by Hollywood filmmakers and actors ==
Several Hollywood filmmakers and actors have visited Villa del Cine. They include actor and director Tim Robbins and the actors Kevin Spacey, Danny Glover and Sean Penn. Robbins praised Villa del Cine for its support of film directors and is considering a film project in Venezuela.

== Analysis ==
The BBC describes Villa del Cine as "a state-of-the-art production house that is changing the face of Venezuelan cinema". Supporters of the project believe that it provides "many people" who could not work in film making before with "an opportunity to work in the industry ..." However, it has also been criticized as a "propaganda factory", according to Nichols and Morse and some independent filmmakers. Chávez said that Villa del Cine would help break the "dictatorship of Hollywood". The studios have been controversial with some Venezuelan filmmakers who fear it may harm independent media. Concern about the new National Law of Cinematography (2005) governing Villa was also expressed by the Motion Picture Association of America. Studio administrators say they are not politically motivated in which films they produce, with executive director Marco Mondarain saying: "We are looking to make good films, no matter what the script. We really want writers and directors to come to us with their ideas. If they're good, we'll support them."

According to an article published by Jump Cut:

Villa del Cine offers support to veteran filmmakers like Román Chalbaud and Luis Alberto Lamata while it enables young filmmakers like Efterpi Charalambidis or Hernán Jabes to make their first projects. The sharp increase in the number of features produced by Villa del Cine over the last years is unquestionable proof that this form of government support has stimulated media production in the country in terms of the number and variety of films, and it has proven a valuable alternative to the Hollywood and neoliberal models of production.

According to Luis Girón, CNAC's president as of 2007: "We don't lay out guidelines for a certain kind of film to be produced, we don't push a specific bias; we just want to be shown as we are." Filmmakers' unions participated in CNAC's 2007 decision-making process. In 2007, Oscar Murat, a project co-ordinator at Villa del Cine stated that politics do not figure in what films are produced. He said that Villa del Cine "received various proposals and of the ones which won commissions, none was linked with politics".
