= La primera vez =

- Film poster
- Directed by: Luis Alberto Lamata
- Starring: Servando Primera; Florentino Primera
- Release date: 1997
- Country: Venezuela
- Language: Spanish

La Primera Vez is a 1997 Venezuelan film directed by Luis Alberto Lamata. Starring the Salserín orchestra, it was Venezuelan box office success.

== Plot ==
The story follows a boy who was just starting his career as an artist (Servando Primera) with a society girl, Camila (Zhandra De Abreu), to reach him thousands of vicissitudes had to happen. Camila traveled to all the cities where the group Salserín was performing to go in search of Servando and deliver the letters he had written to her; all this together with her inseparable friend Gaby (Daniela Alvarado) who longed to meet Florentino Primera.

== Cast ==
- Daniel Lugo as Don Benedicto
- Elba Escobar as Misericordia
- Phaedra López as Susana
- Servando Primera as Servando
- Florentino Primera as Florentino
- Daniela Alvarado as Gaby
- Zhandra De Abreu as Camila
- Erick Noriega as Troconis
- Eileen Abad as Vanessa
- Manuel Guerra
- Flecha Veloz as El Morrocoy (Camila's turtle)
- Orlando Urdaneta
- Gonzalo Cubero
- Aroldo Betancourt
- María Luisa Lamata
- Sol Musset as Servando & Florentino's mom
- Jorge Pizzani as Venezuelan painter
- Omar Vizquel as Venezuelan baseball player
- Carmen Padrón as Car driver
- Natasha Moll as "Chelita"
