= Atacama nivea =

Scientific classification
- Kingdom: Plantae
- Clade: Tracheophytes
- Clade: Angiosperms
- Clade: Eudicots
- Clade: Rosids
- Order: Brassicales
- Family: Brassicaceae
- Tribe: Schizopetaleae
- Genus: Atacama; Toro-Núñez, Mort & Al-Shehbaz
- Species: A. nivea

Binomial name
- Atacama nivea (Phil.) Toro-Núñez, Mort & Al-Shehbaz

Synonyms
- Hesperis nivea (Phil.) Kuntze; Mathewsia nivea (Phil.) O.E.Schulz; Sisymbrium niveum Phil. (1860); Sisymbrium niveum Phil. (1865), nom. illeg.

Species of flowering plant

Atacama nivea is a species of flowering plant in the family Brassicaceae, and the sole species in genus Atacama. It is a subshrub native to the Andes of northern Chile, where it grows in subalpine habitats.

It was first described as Sisymbrium niveum by Rodolfo Amando Philippi in 1860. In 2014 Oscar Toro-Núñez, Mark E. Mort, and Ihsan Ali Al-Shehbaz placed it in the new monotypic genus Atacama.
