= CAP 2 Intentos =

2016 Venezuelan documentary film

- Film poster
- Directed by: Carlos Oteyza
- Written by: Carlos Oteyza
- Release date: 2016
- Running time: 100 minutes
- Country: Venezuela
- Language: Spanish

CAP 2 Intentos (English: CAP 2 Attempts) is a 2016 Venezuelan documentary film written and directed by Carlos Oteyza. The film focuses on the two non-consecutive tenures of President Carlos Andrés Pérez.

The film was awarded the Algo de Cine Association Award in the Best Documentary category.

== See also ==
- Tiempos de dictadura
- El pueblo soy yo
- Rómulo Resiste
