= Jacinto Convit (film) =

2013 documentary film

- Film poster
- Directed by: Sergio Monsalve
- Screenplay by: Sergio Monsalve; María Eugenia Mosquera
- Produced by: Rossara Quintero
- Distributed by: Centro Nacional Autónomo de Cinematografía
- Release date: 2013
- Running time: 75 minutes
- Country: Venezuela

Jacinto Convit is a 2013 documentary film directed by Sergio Monsalve. The documentary focuses on the homonymous Jacinto Convit, a Venezuelan physician and scientist known for developing a vaccine to prevent leprosy and his studies to treat cancer. It was screened at the XI Venezuelan Film Festival in 2015. Jacinto Convit was Sergio Monsalve's directorial debut.
