= Pipí Mil Pupú 2 Lucas =

2012 Venezuelan film

- Film poster
- Directed by: Enrique R. Bencomo; Fernando R. Bencomo
- Written by: Fernando R. Bencomo
- Cinematography: Enrique R. Bencomo
- Music by: Enrique R. Bencomo; Fernando R. Bencomo
- Release date: 2012
- Running time: 65 minutes
- Country: Venezuela
- Language: Spanish

Pipí Mil Pupú 2 Lucas, or Pipí Mil Pupú Dos Lucas, is a 2012 Venezuelan film directed by the Bencomo brothers, Enrique and Fernando.

== Cast ==
- Andrea Jimenez
- Carlos Arraíz
- Juan Gonzalez
- Marcel Fernandez
- Luciano Tribuiani
- Fernando R. Bencomo
- Cesar Perozo
- David Alonso

== Production ==
Among the inspirations cited by the directors are films such as Quentin Tarantino's Pulp Fiction, Christopher Nolan's Memento, the Coen brothers' Fargo and Alejandro González Iñárritu's Amores perros, as well as the book Rebel Without a Crew by Robert Rodriguez.

== Reception ==
Pipí Mil Pupú Dos Lucas was awarded Best Regional Feature Film at the Entre Largos y Cortos de Oriente Film Festival (ELCO) in 2012. It participated in the Mérida Film Festival in 2013 and received two awards at the Festival of Spirituality in Venezuelan Cinema (FESCIVE) in 2013, Best Screenplay and Best Original Music.
