= Tiempos de dictadura =

2012 Venezuelan documentary film

- Film poster
- Spanish: Tiempos de dictadura, tiempos de Marcos Pérez Jiménez
- Directed by: Carlos Oteyza
- Written by: Carlos Oteyza
- Produced by: Siboney Films
- Cinematography: Branimir Caleta
- Music by: Álvaro Cordero
- Release date: 2012
- Running time: 94 minutes
- Country: Venezuela
- Language: Spanish

Tiempos de dictadura (English: Times of dictatorship) is a 2012 Venezuelan documentary film written and directed by Carlos Oteyza, narrated by humorist and political scientist Laureano Márquez. The film focuses on the dictatorship of Marcos Pérez Jiménez.

== Plot ==
The documentary narrates the period of the dictatorship of Marcos Pérez Jiménez, from the 1948 coup d'état against President Rómulo Gallegos and the human rights violations committed by the Seguridad Nacional secret police (including censorship, arrests, torture and extrajudicial killings) to the public works and lavish carnivals promoted by the oil boom.

== Release ==
The film was screened in Venezuela on 7 September 2012. Oteyza declared that he was aiming to screen the documentary on 23 January, the anniversary when Pérez Jiménez was overthrown, but it was not possible due to the production time.

== See also ==
- CAP 2 Intentos
- El pueblo soy yo
- Rómulo Resiste
