= Víctor Cuica =

Venezuelan musician and actor (1949–2020)

Victor Cuica (Caracas, Venezuela, 19 April 1949 – 26 December 2020 ) was a Venezuelan musician and actor recognized for innovation in the fusion of the Jazz with Afro-Caribbean music. He participated in Venezuelan cinema, between the 70s and 80s, with the character of Alexis in Se solicita muchacha de buena presencia y motorizado con moto propia (lit. 'Wanted Good Looking Receptionist and Messenger With his Own Motorcycle') along with the actor, screenwriter and writer Fausto Verdial.
