= EFPEUM =

Film poster

EFPEUM (Estructura Funcional para Encontrarse uno Mismo) is a 1965 Venezuelan film directed and written by Mauricio Odremán. It is considered the first science fiction film in Venezuelan cinema.

== Bibliography ==
- Ricardo Tirado Memoria y notas del cine venezolano, 1960-1976 ISBN 978-980-300-372-2
