= Maroa (film) =

- Promotional release poster
- Directed by: Solveig Hoogesteijn
- Written by: Fernando Castets; Solveig Hoogesteijn; Claudia Nazoa
- Starring: Tristán Ulloa; Yorlis Domínguez; Elba Escobar
- Cinematography: Alfredo Mayo
- Edited by: Carmen Frías
- Music by: Nascuy Linares
- Release date: March 16, 2006 (Toulouse Latin America Film Festival)
- Countries: Venezuela; Spain
- Language: Spanish

Maroa, is a 2006 drama film directed by Solveig Hoogesteijn from a screenplay he co-wrote with Fernando Castets and Claudia Nazoa. It was VIt was selected as the Venezuelan entry for the Best Foreign Language Film at the 79th Academy Awards, but it was not nominated.

"The story of an 11-year-old girl living in the slums of Caracas whose bleak future at the hands of a cruel grandmother, Brigida, and local thugs changes upon first hearing the notes of a classically played clarinet. Sentenced to a reform school for delinquent children, Maroa attends her first music class and falls in love with both Mozart and her music teacher, Joaquín – played by Tristán Ulloa, “Sex and Lucia” – who becomes the first person to give her hope and unconditional support. Joaquín recognizes her rare, raw talent and is determined to pass on the discipline and skills to turn her life around. The challenges they face and their unique student-teacher bond change both their lives forever."

Maroa, though it shows the cruelty and violence present in the lives of children of the slums of Caracas gives hope for the future in its portrayal of a Venezuelan state-sponsored musical training program which has provided both musical instruments, and musical training to over 250 thousand children, as of 2007. Co-written by Fernando Castets, Solveig Hoogesteijn and Claudia Nazoa, the film introduces the young actress Yorlis Domínguez in the title role.

Domínguez' "confident, spontaneous and uniquely authentic portrayal" (according to Below the Line, a film industry magazine) of Maroa was living in the film's environment when she was cast for the role. A four-month casting search had been fruitless, when, with only four days left to cast the role before the start of shooting, she was discovered on the streets of Caracas. Coincidentally, having just been diagnosed with an attention deficit, and having had it suggested that it would be therapeutic for her to become involved in acting in some way—her parents were seeking a casting office. Their conversation was overheard by the casting agent, who was at that very moment, engaged in a frantic search for a girl of the right age and appearance who would be capable of the somewhat difficult role—of Maroa, an orphan on the brink of living a life of crime on the streets, who becomes transformed by the power of music.

Presented by Macu Films and Tornasol Films in association with Televisión Española, Canal+ and with the support of Ibermedia, ICAA and CNAC, the film also features Tristán Ulloa, Elba Escobar, Luke Grande and Enghel Alejo, as well as numerous residents of the economically depressed and notoriously dangerous environment in which the film was shot — in supporting roles, minor speaking roles and as background talent.

== Crew ==
The production team was as follows:

- Executive Producers, Solveig Hoogesteijn and Diana Sánchez
- Line Producer, Josean Gómez
- Associate Producer, Thierry Forte
- Directed by Solveig Hoogesteijn.
- Written by Fernando Castets, Solveig Hoogesteijn and Claudia Nazoa
- Cinematographer, Alfredo Mayo
- Editor Carmen Frías
- Production Design, Diego Rísquez
- Costume Design Rosa Muñoz
- Original Music Nascuy Linares
- Sound editor Stefano Gramitto
- Re-Recording Mixer, Carlos Garrido
- International Film Sales: David Castellanos, Latido Films (http://www.latidofilms.com)
