= Carlos Arraíz =

Venezuelan actor

Carlos Castillo
- Born: Carlos Castillo; Caracas, Venezuela
- Occupations: Actor; model
- Years active: 1991–present

Carlos Castillo, knows by his artistic name as Carlos Arraíz is a Venezuelan actor and model.

== Career ==
He began his career while still a student at the Universidad Central de Venezuela where he joined the theater group El Chichón, and since then, he participated in various stage plays such as La Caja Mágica, Los Chicos del 69, El Principito, La Sirenita, Vaselina: el musical, Se busca corazón among others.

Carlos has won several awards, such as the TIN Teatro Infantil Nacional 2001 and again in 2006.

In 2009, he was selected to be the exclusive voice of AXN Channel. In 2016, he joined the cast of the third season of the musical play A Todo Volumen

== Filmography ==
=== Films ===
- Pipí Mil Pupú 2 Lucas (2012)

=== Television ===
- Archivos del más allá (2003-2004)
- La CQ (2012) as Eleuterio
- Cosita rica (2003) as Farmacéutico
- Guayoyo Express (2005) as Locuaz Camargo Parle
- El gato tuerto (2007) as Oscarde Coromoto Sabroso Humpiérrez
- La mujer perfecta (2010) as Marlon Pájaro
- Los secretos de Lucía (2013) as Tigre
- Escándalos El doble (2016) as Hernán "El lobo" Ferrer
