= Galus Galus =

- Film poster
- Directed by: Clarissa Duque
- Release date: 2013
- Running time: 12 minutes
- Country: Venezuela
- Language: Spanish

Galus Galus is a 2013 Venezuelan animated short film.

== Plot ==
"Maybe, some time ago, he had a family. Maybe once, he had loved ones awaiting for him. Today he's only a shadow lost amongst all the shadows that no one sees; a shadow that wakes up in the sidewalk and rummages the trashcans, searching for bottles, cans or food. One morning, life crosses his path. Friendship comes into his life in a form of an egg while searching in the trash. His entire world accommodates under the shade of an old tree, and the strong friendship seems to sing in the air of the indifferent city, and the kites play in the sky of a metropolis that is now seen with new eyes. What evil powers can separate this man from his loyal friend?"

== Reception ==
The film was screened at the Short Film Conner section of the Cannes Film Festival, and received an Honorable Mention at the Margarita Film Festival.
