= El extraordinario viaje del dragón =

- Film poster
- Directed by: Kaori Flores Yonekura
- Produced by: Nuevo Objetivo Film CA; CNAC; Eva Equipments
- Release date: 2025
- Running time: 84 minutes
- Country: Venezuela
- Language: Spanish

El extraordinario viaje del dragón (English: The Extraordinary Journey of Dragon) is a 2025 documentary film by Venezuelan-Japanese director Kaori Flores Yonekura. The filmmaker discovers 900 photographs taken by her great-uncle Yoshitomi, who documented his life from 1933 to 1945—beginning as a young soldier in Japan, through his migration to Peru, and finally Venezuela. Through these images, the figure of the Dragon emerges—a chimera that, like every migrant, adapts and transforms according to the territories it conquers, blending memory, myth, and reality. The film was Venezuela's candidate for the 40th Goya Awards as Best Ibero-American Film.
