= Rómulo Resiste =

2021 Venezuelan film

- Film poster
- Directed by: Carlos Oteyza
- Written by: Carlos Oteyza; Lorena González Di Totto
- Cinematography: Gustavo Poleo
- Music by: Álvaro Cordero
- Distributed by: Siboney Films
- Release dates: 11 October 2021 (streaming); 14 October 2021 (cinemas)
- Country: Venezuela
- Language: Spanish

Rómulo Resiste (lit. 'Rómulo Resists'), also stylized as RR or Rómulo ~~Renuncia~~ Resiste (lit. 'Rómulo ~~Resigns~~ Resists'), is a 2021 Venezuelan documentary film directed by Carlos Oteyza. The documentary focuses on the presidency of Rómulo Betancourt between 1959 and 1964.

== Plot ==
Rómulo Betancourt is the first elected president of Venezuela to receive power from another one democratically elected. His government, between 1959 and 1964, had to face two main challenges: military authoritarianism and Marxism, both of which sought to impose a different model from representative democracy. The narration of historical events is intertwined with the childhood experiences of the documentary director, Carlos Oteyza. The film includes the testimonies of both political protagonists of the 1960s, historians and intellectuals, images from domestic and international archives and animated 3D sequences. The documentary is narrated by the actor and psychologist Sócrates Serrano.

== Testimonies ==
- Alfredo Schael
- Américo Martín
- Carlos Canache Mata
- Edgardo Mondolfi
- Gudat Fernando Falcó
- Elisa Lerner
- Héctor Pérez Marcano
- José Alberto Olivar
- Lorena Puerta
- Luis Betancourt Oteyza
- Marco Tulio Bruni Celli
- Orlando Andersen
- Paola Bautista
- Pedro Palma
- Ramón Guillermo Aveledo

== Reception ==
Venezuelan film critic Sergio Monsalve praised the documentary.

== See also ==
- Tiempos de dictadura
- CAP 2 Intentos
- El pueblo soy yo
