= My Otaku Girlfriend =

2023 Venezuelan film

- Theatrical release poster
- Mi novia otaku
- Directed by: Edio Raven
- Written by: Edio Raven
- Produced by: Anderson Acosta
- Starring: Miguelángel Hidalgo; Karla Scallop; Frank Coello; Subotic Kelliens
- Production company: Despertar Films
- Release date: September 28, 2023 (Amazon Prime)
- Running time: 112 minutes
- Country: Venezuela
- Language: Spanish

My Otaku Girlfriend (Spanish: Mi novia otaku) is a 2023 Venezuelan drama film written and directed by Edio Raven.

== Plot ==
The plot follows a young Venezuelan mangaka, Manuel Cavalier (Miguelangel Hidalgo), who publishes his work Rey de fuego (Spanish: Fire King) anonymously on the Internet, until one day he is discovered by Eugenia Rangel (Karla Vieira), a successful influencer passionate about otaku culture who pushes him to reconnect with his vocation.

== Cast ==
- Miguelángel Hidalgo as Manuel Cavalier.
- Karla Vieira as Eugenia Rangel.
- Frank Coello as Alejandro Magno.
- Subotic Kelliens as Marta Márquez.

== Production ==
The idea for the project arose in Maracaibo, where funds were raised for the film, until it was finally filmed in Caracas. The announcement of the film was made through Amazon Prime in February 2023, and the shooting process started in Caracas in Marc. Director Edio Raven described the filming as taking "more than 23 days, with over a break each week."

The film was produced independently, despite the crisis in Venezuela. To finalize the project, the producers started a crowdfunding campaign.

== Reception ==
Before its release, the movie was screened on 12 August at the Tomodachi Convention, an anime event, in Maracaibo. The film was released internationally on 28 September 2023, and in Caracas it was screened at the Trasnocho Cultural theater.
