= Kaori Flores Yonekura =

Venezuelan filmmaker

- Citizenship: Venezuelan
- Occupation: Filmmaker

Kaori Flores Yonekura is a Venezuelan filmmaker of Japanese descent (nikkei).

== Education ==
Yonekura graduated with a degree in production from the EICTV.

== Career ==
She has been a member of the selection committee for the Documenta Caracas Festival, the script evaluation committee for the Franco-Andean Workshop Sembrando Cine, and the isLAB International Project Development Workshop, as well as of the jury for the Bordes Festival in San Cristóbal and short film jury of the Vancouver Latin American Film Festival.

Her documentary Nikkei received the Signis Venezuela Award and was awarded as the Best Documentary at Fescive, as well ass nominated for Best Documentary at the Icaro Central American Film Festival, for the Doc Andino Award, and for Best Documentary at Documenta Caracas. Her feature film El extraordinario viaje del dragón was Venezuela's candidate for the 40th Goya Awards as Best Ibero-American Film.
