= The Moving Picture Man =

1977 film

- Film poster
- Directed by: Luis Armando Roche
- Starring: Juliet Berto
- Production company: Chabono Films
- Release date: July 1977
- Running time: 94 minutes
- Country: Venezuela
- Language: Spanish
- Budget: $443,000

The Moving Picture Man (Spanish: El cine soy yo) is a 1977 Venezuelan drama film directed by Luis Armando Roche. It was entered into the 10th Moscow International Film Festival.

== Cast ==
- Juliet Berto
- Domingo Del Castillo
- Freddy Galavís
- Asdrúbal Meléndez as Jacinto
- Alvaro Roche as Manuel
