= Lejos de casa: éxodo venezolano =

2020 film

- Directed by: Abner Ramirez
- Written by: Abner Ramirez
- Produced by: Abner Ramirez
- Cinematography: Franmar Alfonzo
- Edited by: Franmar Alfonzo
- Music by: Richard Loaiza
- Production companies: AR Films, Maximo Project Films
- Release date: March 19, 2020 (Chile)
- Running time: 87 minute
- Country: Venezuela
- Language: Spanish

Lejos de casa: éxodo venezolano (English: Far from Home: Venezuelan Exodus) is a 2020 Venezuelan drama film directed by Abner Ramirez. The film is about the Venezuelan diaspora during the crisis in Venezuela, including the young people that leave the country looking for a better future.

== Plot ==
Samuel is a young Venezuelan who takes a bus to Chile, emigrating there to find the stability he cannot in his own country. Upon reaching Santiago de Chile, Samuel realizes that emigrating bears several obstacles that he has to deal with to achieve his goal.

== Production ==
The film's director, Abner Ramírez, has expressed that he has always wanted to make a film about his life because, despite suffering many hardships, he managed to overcome them and succeeded, and that he wanted to inspire the Venezuelans who leave their country seeking a better life. The film began production in Santiago de Chile, being funded independently. Before the release of the film, Ramírez sought out collaborations and ideas to finish the production, hoping to release the film as soon as possible and screen it in Latin American movie theaters.

== Cast ==
- Gabriel Buitrago
- Abner Official
- Yroski Palacios
- Gretchell Loaiza
- Angibell Nichols
- Darwing Gonzalez
