= Me & the Beasts =

2021 Venezuelan film

- Theatrical release poster
- Yo y las bestias
- Directed by: Nico Manzano
- Written by: Nico Manzano
- Produced by: Ricardo Espinoza; Nico Manzano; Alan Ohep
- Starring: Jesús Nunes
- Cinematography: Nico Manzano
- Edited by: Alan Ohep
- Music by: Nika Elia
- Production companies: Films Austères; Linterna Studio; TRES Cinematografía
- Distributed by: Bendita Films Sales
- Release date: 2021
- Running time: 77 minutes
- Country: Venezuela
- Language: Spanish

Me & The Beasts (Spanish: Yo y las bestias) is a 2021 Venezuelan fantasy drama film written and directed by Nico Manzano in his directorial debut. The film was praised for its story, direction, cinematography and performances, receiving several awards in film festivals. Cinema Tropical's included it in the list of the "best Latin American films of 2022".

== Plot ==
The film follows Andrés Bravo (Jesús Nunes), a lonely young scientist with dreams of becoming a musician who decides to leave his band, Los Pijamistas, after learning that his bandmates agreed to play at the Suena Caracas festival. Andrés begins his solo career and faces many of the obstacles of the crisis in Venezuela, including exile, hyperinflation, and power outages. The film's story is set in 2016.

== Cast ==
- Jesús Nunes as Andrés Bravo

== Production ==
Director Nico Manzano explains in an interview that the idea for the film came from a sound he found while producing the musical album The River with Nika Kvaratskhelia. Said sound defined the sound aesthetic of the band with which he played in Barcelona, Spain, between 2011 and 2013. When Manzano returned to Venezuela in 2013, the album was left unfinished halfway through. Two songs from the film were composed during that period without knowing that they would be included in a feature film. As for the color palette, Nico cited as inspiration the salt flats of Las Cumaraguas, in the Paraguaná Peninsula, and the Venezuelan painter Ramón Vásquez Brito, as well as the influence of artists such as Carlos Cruz-Diez and Jesús Soto. Film maker Yorgos Lanthimos was mentioned as an influence for direction, while Hong Sang-soo was mentioned as the one for awkward humor.

Manzano met the lead actor, Jesus Nunes, after attending the play Se hunde el barco, written and directed by Fernando Azpúrua and Oswaldo Maccio, where Jesus was one of the main characters. Jesús later received a call from the film's production to make the first casting call. Not being a musician, Jesús was tutored by Max Manzano, the director's brother, for several months, learning to play the guitar. The director says it took between three and four months to write the script.

Shooting for the film began in 2017, which had to adapt to the factors of the crisis in Venezuela, including protests, hyperinflation and migration. With limited resources, Manzano decided to shoot with few shots, possibly around one hundred, and in the end approximately eighty-seven were used. The sound design was carried out during 2018. In addition to original music produced by the director and Nika Elia, the film also featured collaborations with Diego García, Gael Gaviota and Luis "Tafio" Méndez, as well as a special appearance by Jorge "Pepino" González.

== Reception ==
Me & the Beasts has been praised for its story, direction, cinematography and performances. The film won three of the six post-production awards granted by Ventana Sur 2020. After the completion of the film thanks to the awards, it will have its world and Latin American premiere in the same week, in the official selection of the Mar del Plata International Film Festival 2021, in Argentina, and the Tallinn Black Nights Film Festival 2021, in Estonia. The film was also presented at the following festivals: Belo Horizonte, Brazil; Chicago Latino; Norient Film Festival, Switzerland; Neighboring Scenes: New Latin American Cinema, New York; Cine Las Américas International, Texas; and Cartagena, Colombia, among others.

After several festivals and subsequent exhibitions in France, the United States, Poland, Colombia, Switzerland, Brazil and Mexico, the film won the award for best director at the 2022 Kimolos International Festival in Greece, the audience trophy at the 2022 Rizoma Film Festival in Spain, best film and best soundtrack at the Soundscreen Film Festival 2022 in Italy, and was awarded five statuettes at the Venezuelan Film Festival 2022, including best film, best director and best soundtrack. It was also included in Cinema Tropical's list of the "best Latin American films of 2022", non-profit organization dedicated to the promotion of Latin American cinema.

== Accolades ==
| Year | Award / Film Festival | Category | Result |
|---|---|---|---|
| 2020 | Ventana Sur | Sofia Films Award | Won |
| 2020 | Ventana Sur | NMF Y Color Front Award | Won |
| 2020 | Ventana Sur | La Mayor Cine Award | Won |
| 2022 | Kimolos International Festival | Best Director | Won |
| 2022 | Rizoma Film Festival | Audience Trophy | Won |
| 2022 | Soundscreen Film Festival | Best Feature Film | Won |
| 2022 | Soundscreen Film Festival | Best Soundtrack | Won |
| 2022 | Venezuelan Film Festival | Best Director | Won |
| 2022 | Venezuelan Film Festival | Best Feature Film | Won |
| 2022 | Venezuelan Film Festival | Best Soundtrack | Won |
