= País Portátil =

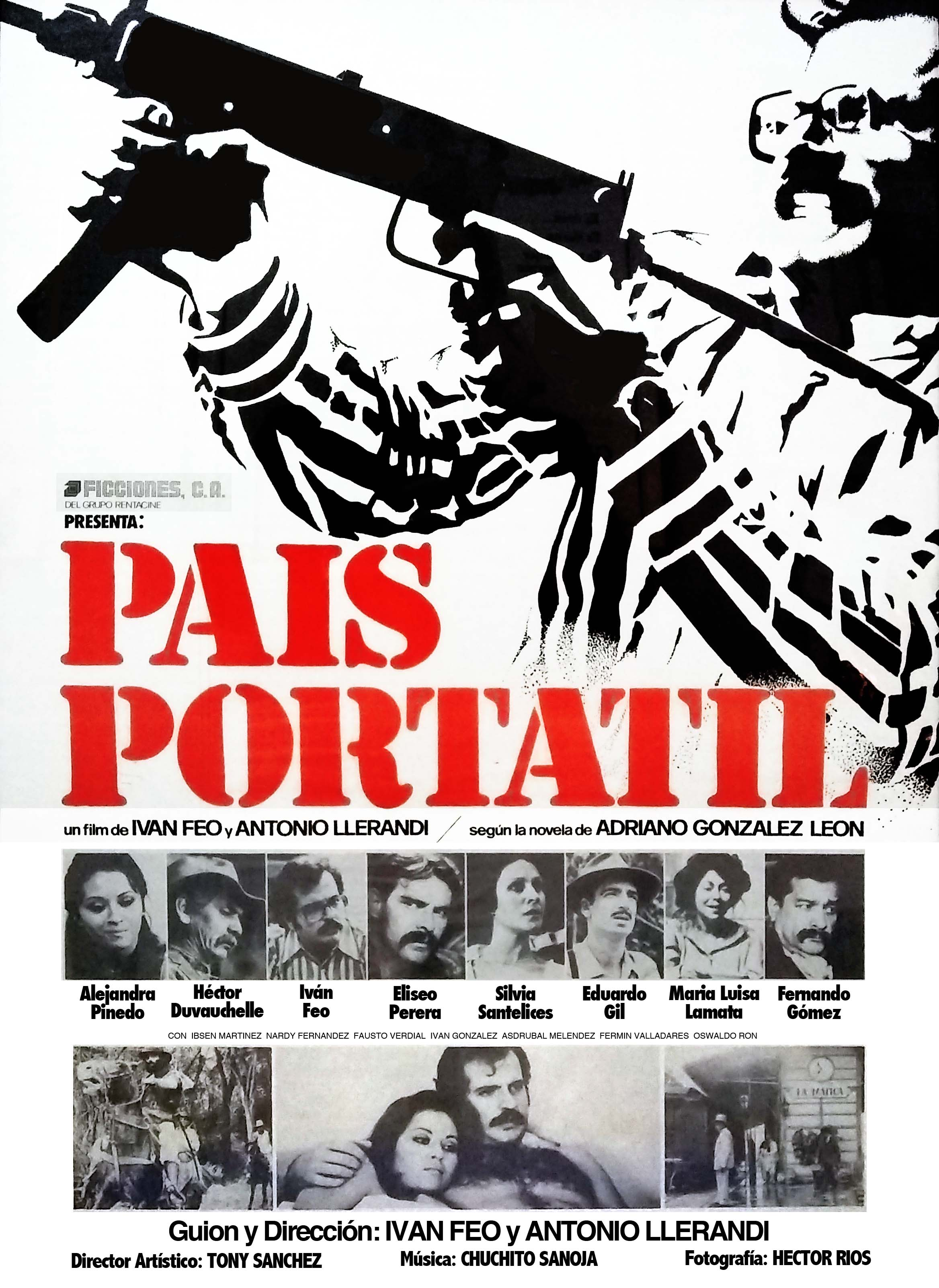
- Directed by: Iván Feo; Antonio Llerandi
- Written by: Adriano González León (novel); Iván Feo (screenplay and adaptation); Antonio Llerandi (screenplay and adaptation); Ibsen Martínez (adaptation)
- Produced by: Ficciones C.A.
- Release date: January 24, 1979 (Venezuela)
- Running time: 103 minutes
- Country: Venezuela
- Language: Spanish
- Budget: $322,000

País Portátil (English: Portable Country) is a Venezuelan film screened in 1979 and directed by Iván Feo and Antonio Llerandi based on the novel of Adriano González León. The film is part of UNESCO's Memory of the World Programme National Cinematic Heritage.

== Cast ==
- Alejandra Pinedo - Delia
- Héctor Duvauchelle - Salvador Barazarte
- Iván Feo - Andrés Barazarte
- Eliseo Perera - León Perfecto Barazarte
- Silvia Santelices - Ernestina Barazarte
- Eduardo Gil - Nicolasito Barazarte
- Ibsen Martínez - José Eladio Barazarte
- Nardy Fernández - Hortensia Barazarte
- Fausto Verdial - Eliseo Quintero
- Iván González - Jaramillo
- Asdrúbal Melendez - "Cura de la iglesia"
- Maria Luisa Lamata - Adelaida Saavedra
- Fernando Gómez - Epifanio Barazarte
