= Día naranja =

- Film poster
- Directed by: Alejandra Szeplaki
- Starring: Carolina Riveros; Bernarda Pagés; Martina García
- Release dates: 9 October 2009 (Venezuela); 22 September 2011 (Argentina)
- Country: Venezuela
- Language: Spanish

Día naranja (lit. 'Orange day') is a 2009 Venezuelan, Colombian and Argentinean co-produced film directed by Venezuelan filmmaker Alejandra Szeplaki. The film, released in Venezuela on 9 October 2009, premiered in Argentina on 22 September 2011.

The film was preselected for the Academy Awards.

== Plot ==
Three women from different cities in Latin America: Ana in Buenos Aires, Sol in Bogotá and Patricia in Caracas, live a day in which they simultaneously face the doubt of whether or not to take a pregnancy test.

== Cast ==
- Carolina Riveros - Patricia
- Bernarda Pagés - Ana
- Martina García - Sol
- Andrés Suárez - Carlos
- Juan Pablo Raba - Leo
- Martín Borisenko - Juan
- Reinaldo Zavarce - Víctor
- Carolina Torres
- Gabriela Lerner
- Jimena de la Torre
- Juan Pablo Shuk
- Marisa Román
- Michelle Manterola

== Reception ==
=== Critical reception ===
A mixed review by Isabel González found this "[Orange day] (...) pink, very pink''.

=== Screenings ===
The film was screened in 2015 at the Museo de Arte Valencia to celebrate the International Day of Women; and the Festival de Cine Venezolano.
