= Nicolás Curiel =

Venezuelan stage director and actor (1928–2021)

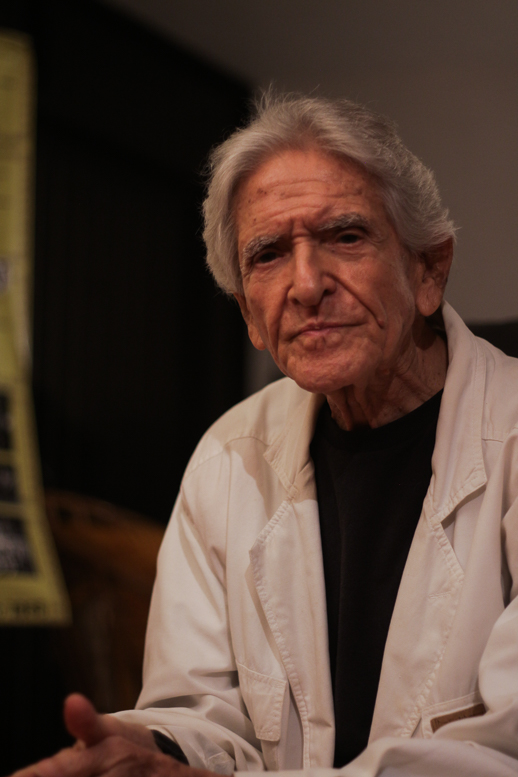
- Born: 26 April 1928; Caracas, United States of Venezuela
- Died: 3 March 2021 (aged 92)
- Occupations: Stage Director; Actor

Nicolás Curiel (26 April 1928 – 3 March 2021) was a Venezuelan stage director and actor.

== Biography ==
Nicolás was born in Caracas to Humberto Curiel and Carmen Acosta. He completed his secondary studies at the Liceo Fermín Toro, where he took part in experimental theatre alongside Román Chalbaud. In 1947, he began studying at the Central University of Venezuela (UCV) and joined the university's theatre. He travelled to France in 1949 to study at the Faculty of Law at the Sorbonne. He became a troupe member at the Théâtre National Populaire alongside Léon Gischia and Jean Vilar, and became a member of the French Communist Party.

Curiel returned to Venezuela and rejoined the UCV's university theatre, taking charge of its direction in 1956. During his twelve years in the position, he helped train the likes of José Ignacio Cabrujas, María Cristina Lozada, Gustavo Rodríguez, Teresa Selma, and others. In 1957, he staged a performance speaking out against the dictatorship of Marcos Pérez Jiménez.

In 2018, Curiel was awarded a Doctor Honoris Causa by the Central University of Venezuela. He also became an Officier de l’ordre des arts et des lettres . Nicolás Curiel died on 3 March 2021 at the age of 92.
