= El pueblo soy yo =

2018 documentary film directed by Carlos Oteyza

- Release poster
- Directed by: Carlos Oteyza
- Produced by: Enrique Krauze
- Release date: 11 October 2018
- Countries: Mexico; Venezuela

El pueblo soy yo (English: I am the people), also known as El Pueblo Soy Yo: Venezuela en Populismo, is a 2018 documentary film directed by Venezuelan filmmaker Carlos Oteyza and produced by Mexican historian Enrique Krauze. It was inspired by Krauze's book of the same name. The film explores the populism of Hugo Chávez.

== Synopsis ==
According to Oteyza, the Chávez presidency and its control mechanisms of populism not only inspired a wealth redistribution, but also show the existence of a charismatic leader that divides society, establishes a hegemony of communication, and controls the institutions. Oteyza explains that the documentary is not a review of the situation in Venezuela, because it is a situation that has not ended. It intends to expose and examine the rise and success of Chávez and then Nicolás Maduro and how populism can endanger any democracy.

Oteyza, a social historian, uses archive footage and interviews with other experts to create views of the situation, examining populism through the lens of Venezuela. It describes the events from Chávez's failed coup to his rise and then the fall of the regime as discontent at economic failure and growing authoritarianism takes the people.

Some of those featured in the documentary include Krauze, Fernando Mires, Loris Zanatta, Alberto Barrera Tyszka, and Ana Rosa Torres.

== Production ==
The film was the idea of producer Enrique Krauze, who had just published a book with the same title, which formed the basis for the examination. Oteyza has said that the film is sad but necessary.

== Reception ==
The documentary was nominated in the 34th Guadalajara International Film Festival for the feature-length documentary category.

It was first released in Spain, which El País suggested was because the Spanish have a fascination with the struggle of Venezuela. The newspaper reviewed the film as trying to be enlightening, but leaving out some things that El País argues are crucial to the narrative; it suggests that a discussion of the political opposition would have been more useful than "an emphatic highlighting" of the economic crisis through images of empty supermarkets and people searching through trash.

A Venezuelan reviewer, Lilian Rosales, noted that for her countrymen, the film answers questions they all have about how a regime that seemed so fruitful could fall so tremendously and cause the Venezuelan crisis, but still have support. Also, contrary to the El País review, Rosales writes that the film "tries to set aside the possible melodrama [...] to build a serious account", but does acknowledge a lack of "explicit references in defense of opposing positions to the government".

== See also ==
- Bolivarian Revolution in film
- Tiempos de dictadura
- CAP 2 Intentos
- Rómulo Resiste
