= Luis Armando Roche =

Venezuelan film director (1938–2021)

- Born: November 21, 1938; Caracas, Venezuela
- Died: October 2, 2021 (aged 82); Caracas, Venezuela
- Occupation: Film director
- Spouse: Marion Cisneros (m. 1961, divorced)
- Children: 4

Luis Armando Roche (November 21, 1938 – October 2, 2021) was a Venezuelan film director, screenwriter, producer and director of theatre and opera. In 1999, Roche won the most important prize of cinema in his country, the National Film Award of Venezuela.

== Early life and education ==
Roche was born in Caracas, Venezuela, on November 21, 1938. Luis' father was also named Luis Roche (1888–1965, an urban planner, amateur photographer and filmmaker, and creator of the Plaza Altamira, Caracas) and his mother was Beatrice Dugand (b. 1898). The origin of their families can be found in France (Roche and Dugand), Italy (Gnecco by the mother) and Ireland. The Irish family emigrated to France after the Battle of Limerick.

Roche studied primary school in Caracas. In 1945, he moved to the Venezuelan Andes and studied for 2 years at the San Jose School in Mérida. In 1947, his father was Ambassador of Venezuela in Argentina, so he studied at the French School of Buenos Aires. In 1949, Roche joined the Nyack Junior School, an elementary school near New York. Two years later, he enrolled at The Choate School, a college preparatory school located in Wallingford, Connecticut. In 1957, he finished his high school and studied for one year at Tulane University in New Orleans. Two years later, he returned to Caracas.

== Career ==
From 1962 to 1964, he studied at the Institute for Advanced Film Studies (IDHEC) in Paris, where he received the title of Director-Producer. During that time, he made his first short film: Genevilliers, port of Paris (1964), a documentary focused on one port of Paris. A year later, he finished Raymond Isidore and His House (1965), a documentary about a "naif" builder in Chartres, France, who made his house with different pieces such as bottles, caps, glasses, etc. During his second year at the IDHEC, Roche made the short film Let's To See Said a Blind Man To His Deaf Wife (1965). From that moment, Roche continued to study film at the University of California, Los Angeles and the University of Southern California. In 1965, his father died and he returned to Caracas.

Arriving at the capital of Venezuela, he worked at ARS, an advertising agency. Roche was assistant to the writer Alejo Carpentier, and of Bob Ferber, head of public relations. At that time, the renowned Venezuelan filmmaker Margot Benacerraf gave him the opportunity to be Director of the Audiovisual Department, Film, Theatre and Television at the National Institute of Culture (INCIBA). During those years, Roche was one of the founding members of the National Cinematheque: Fundación Cinemateca Nacional de Venezuela. He also wrote and directed, for the INCIBA, scripts and short films: The feast of the Virgen de la Candelaria (1966) (La fiesta de la Virgen de La Candelaria) and The Devils of San Miguel (1966) (Los demonios de San Miguel).

A year later, he co-wrote and directed with Jean-Jacques Bichier, the short film Víctor Millán (1967). In Paris, he wrote and directed a medium-length work titled Carlos Cruz Diez, 1923–1977. On the Road to Color (1971) (Carlos Cruz Diez, 1923–1977. En el camino del color), this work was followed by Ignacio "Indio" Figueredo (1972), a short film about the great Venezuelan harpist; the same year made Mérida is Not A Town (1972), (Mérida no es un pueblo), an experimental short film. Also he wrote and directed the medium-length Like Islands in Time (1975) (Como islas en el tiempo), about the Charles Brewer-Carias expedition to the tepuis Sarisariñama and Jaua, located in Amazonas (Venezuela). He produced, wrote, and directed Virtuosos (1999), about Venezuelan folk musicians of the 20th century. As well, he wrote with Diana Abreu Bach In Zaraza (2000), a short musical about an imaginary trip to Venezuela of Johann Sebastian Bach. At the same time, Roche worked as assistant director on many foreign films that were shot in Venezuela and Colombia, including:

- The Epic of Bolivar (directed by Alessandro Blasetti)
- Popsy Pop - or La Belle et le Truand (directed by Jean Herman)
- The Adventurers of Lewis Gilbert and Murphy's War (made by Peter Yates)

In 1977, Roche made his first feature film, The Moving Picture Man (El cine soy yo). The film was co-wrote with Fabrice Helion. In this film, Roche made his first performance as actor. The film was presented at international festivals, including the Cannes Film Festival (Un Certain Regard), the Moscow Film Festival and San Sebastian. The Moving Picture Man is one of the most recognised Venezuelan films.

In 1994, The Moving Picture Man was featured in the exhibition "Venezuela: Forty Years of Cinema, 1950–1990" at the Museum of Modern Art with two other fellow Venezuelan filmographers.

Years later, Roche released The Secret (El secreto) (1988), a thriller where he also made his second role as actor. In 1996, he directed Out In The Open (Aire Libre), a film co-wrote with Jacques Espagne. In this movie, Roche played the character of Siefert. Out In The Open was based on the scientific trip to equatorial lands of Alexander von Humboldt and Aimé Bonpland and was awarded in different Cinema festivals. In 2003, Roche directed Yotama Goes Flying (2003) (Yotama se va volando), a film wrote with Carlos Brito and Jacques Espagne. In 2011, he wrote and directed Suddenly, A Film (2011) (De repente, La película), a satirical and improvised comedy with Daniela Bascope and Carlos Antonio León as two lovers who try to shoot a movie in the Venezuelan jungle with disastrous results. In this film, Roche also played three characters and composed several musical pieces.

== Filmography ==
Year	Movie	Role
2011	Los Pacheco, A Salsa Family (documentary short)	Director, Screenwriter
2011	Suddenly, A Film (fiction feature length)	Director, Screenwriter, Actor, Composer
2011	My Brother Marcel Roche (documentary)	Director, Screenwriter
2003	Cosmic Opera (cortometraje)	Director, Screenwriter, Adaptation
2003	Yotama Goes Flying (fiction feature length)	Director, Screenwriter
2001	Bach in Zaraza (documentary)	Director, Screenwriter
2000	Virtuosos (short)	Director, Screenwriter, Cinematography, Sound
1996	Out in the Open (en) / Le Passage des hommes libres (fr) (fiction feature length)	Director, co-writer, Producer
1998	El secreto (largometraje ficción)	Director
1977	The Moving Picture Man (fiction feature length)	Director, Screenwriter
1975	Like Islands in Time (short)	Director, Screenwriter
1974	Una singular posta científica (short)	Director, Screenwriter
1972	Mérida Is Not A Town (short)	Director, Screenwriter, Producer
1972	El indio Figueredo (short)	Director, Screenwriter
1971	Carlos Cruz Diez, 1923–1977. On The Road To Color (documentary short)	Director, Screenwriter, Sound
1969	La bulla del diamante (short)	Director, Screenwriter, Cinematography
1968	Drums From San Juan (documentary short)	Director, Screenwriter
1968	Víctor Millán (documentary short)	Director, Screenwriter, Production, Cinematography, Sound
1966	Los locos de San Miguel (documentary short)	Director, Screenwriter, Cinematography
1966	La fiesta de la virgen de La Candelaria (documentary short)	Director, Screenwriter, Cinematography, Camera Operator
1964	Raymond Isidore and His House (documentary short)	Director, Screenwriter
1963	Vamos a ver dijo un ciego a su esposa sorda (short)	Director, Screenwriter
1963	Gennevilliers, puerto de París (short)	Director, Screenwriter

== Personal life ==
In 1961, Roche married Marion Cisneros. From his first marriage he had 4 children. In the early 1960s, the couple moved to Europe where Roche began his Cinema studies.

Roche died in Caracas at the age of 82 on October 2, 2021.

== Bibliography ==
- ARMAS, Ricardo; MARQUEZ, Manuel. Luis Armando Roche, Cine a través del espejo. Caracas, Comala.com, 2004. ISBN 980-390-096-X
- LOZADA, Carolina. Luis Armando Roche (Cuadernos cineastas venezolanos). Caracas, Fundación Cinemateca Nacional, 2008. ISBN 980-6506-03-0
- ROCHE, Luis Armando. Asómate, hacia adentro. Charleston SC, 2010. ISBN 978-1-4537-4888-6
