= Misión H2O =

- Directed by: Álvaro Cáceres
- Starring: Melanie Henríquez; Manuel Bastos; Laura de la Uz
- Release date: 2018
- Country: Venezuela
- Language: Spanish

Misión H2O is a Venezuelan 3D animated film produced by Albatros Producciones, based on its predecessor, the animated series called Samuel y las cosas.

== Plot ==
The feature film tells the story of Samuel and his friends, who must embark on an adventure to save the planet from the aliens who stole all the water from their community (Buenaventura) led by an evil alien named "M", who tries to prevent the mission of the little ones, kidnapping Sara, one of Samuel's friends. Meanwhile, during the journey, they will teach a lesson to the inhabitants of Buenaventura about the importance of saving water.

== Cast ==
| Character | Voice actor |
|---|---|
| Samuel | Melanie Henríquez |
| Sara | Melanie Henríquez |
| Samuel's classmates | Melanie Henríquez |
| Grandpa | Manuel Bastos |
| M | Laura de la Uz |

Additional voices

- Germán Anzola
- Rafael Monsalve
- Lileana Chacón

== Awards ==
The film has won several awards and at least an honorific mention:

- Best Film, Jury Award; Festicine Kids 21
- Best Screenplay; Animatiba Festival
- Best Sound; Venezuelan Film Festival
- Honorable Mention; Roshd Film Festival
