= They Call Us Warriors =

2018 Venezuelan film

- Film poster
- Spanish: Nos llaman guerreras
- Directed by: Jennifer Socorro; David Alonso; Edwin Corona Ramos
- Written by: Edwin Corona Ramos; Jennifer Socorro
- Produced by: Priscilla Torres; Jennifer Socorro
- Starring: Deyna Castellanos; Veronica Herrera; Yerlianes Moreno; Sandra Luzardo; Daniuska Rodríguez
- Cinematography: David Alonso
- Edited by: Enrique Aranguren; Keyla Bernal
- Music by: Carlos Poletto
- Distributed by: Al Agua Cinema
- Release date: 16 February 2018
- Running time: 82 minutes
- Country: Venezuela
- Language: Spanish

They Call Us Warriors (Spanish: Nos llaman guerreras) is a 2018 Venezuelan documentary film about the female Venezuela national football team and their competition in the World Cup.

== Plot ==
After winning at the U17 South American Women Championship, as well as facing social and economic hardships to practice football discrimination in the environment of a machista sport, the Venezuelan national female football team, led by its captain Deyna Castellanos, has a chance to win the World Cup in Jordan, the first one for Venezuela, and to give a voice to women football in Venezuela. The documentary film features places from Naguanagua, Guasdualito, Mérida and Caracas in Venezuela, to Florida, in the United States.

== Reception ==
The film was screened at the Havana Film Festival, the Brooklyn Film Festival, the Atlanta Film Festival in April 2018 and on 29 September 2018 at the Women Sports Film Festival.
