= Margarita Latin American and Caribbean Film Festival =

Margarita Latin American and Caribbean Film Festival Festival de Cine Latinoamericano y Caribeño de Margarita
- Poster of the 2012 edition
- Status: active
- Genre: Film festival
- Frequency: Annually
- Locations: Porlamar, Margarita Island
- Country: Venezuela
- Years active: 18
- Founder: Victor Luckert
- Sponsor: Cine Amazonia Films

The Margarita Latin American and Caribbean Film Festival, sometimes known as FilMar,^{:107} is an international cultural event dedicated to generating spaces for the distribution and promotion of the best of Venezuelan, Latin American, and Caribbean film.

== History ==
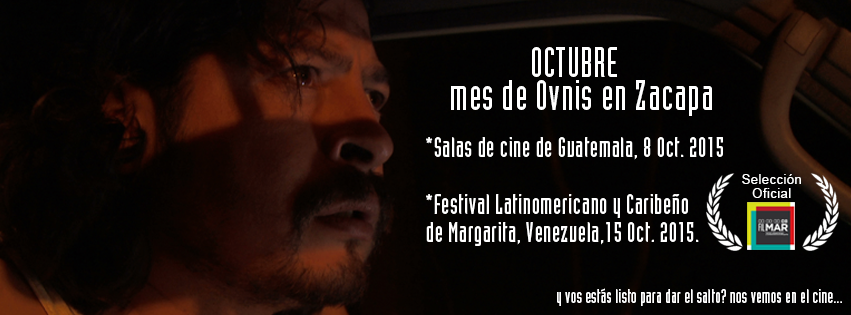
A banner of Octubre Mes de Ovnis, saying it will be shown at the festival in its 2015 edition

It began in 2008, started through the Cinema and Audiovisual Media Platform of Venezuela's Ministry of Culture, with the national film distributor Amazonia Films organizing the awards. It takes place during the month of October of each year on Margarita Island. Its main award is the Golden Pelican.

The festival is open to all, being reviewed positively as an area where poor children can go and watch the films being publicly screened, allowing them to see a different style of media to the blockbusters in cinemas.^{:89}

== Award categories ==
The award trophies are stylistic pelican head statuettes.

=== Latin American and Caribbean Films ===
Awards in this category include monetary prizes in United States dollars.

- Best First Feature: Latin American and Caribbean Fiction
- Best First Feature: Latin American and Caribbean Documentary
- Best Latin American and Caribbean Animated Film
- Distribution and First Copy Awards; presented by Amazonia Films to premiere the winning films in Venezuela

=== Venezuelan Films ===
Awards in this category included monetary prizes in Venezuelan bolívares.

- Best Venezuelan Feature Film: Fiction
- Best Venezuelan Feature Film: Documentary
- Best Venezuelan Medio Film: Fiction
- Best Venezuelan Medio Film: Documentary
- Best Venezuelan Short Film: Fiction
- Best Venezuelan Short Film: Documentary

=== Other awards ===
- Golden Pelican for Best Film
- Audience Award
- Latin America Federation of Audiovisual Education Award (Premio FEISAL)
- Venezuelan Society of Film Editors Award for Best Editing (Premio SCEV)

== Recurring events ==
- Rodolfo Santana "Las Primas tienen Padrinos" Screenwriting Clinic
- Project Development Course
- National Community Film and Video Contest
- "Mis Primeros Pies-cesitos" Child Film Contest
- Cinema under the Stars
- Filmarcito

Other events covering different aspects of filmmaking have been hosted by experts in the field at different editions.

== See also ==
- Galus Galus
