= Atacama (film) =

2020 Venezuelan film

- Film poster
- Directed by: Enrique R. Bencomo
- Release date: 2020
- Countries: Chile; Venezuela
- Language: Spanish

Atacama is a 2020 film directed by Venezuelan director Enrique R. Bencomo. It was selected for festivals such as Havana Film Festival and Santiago International Film Festival.
