= Adriano González León =

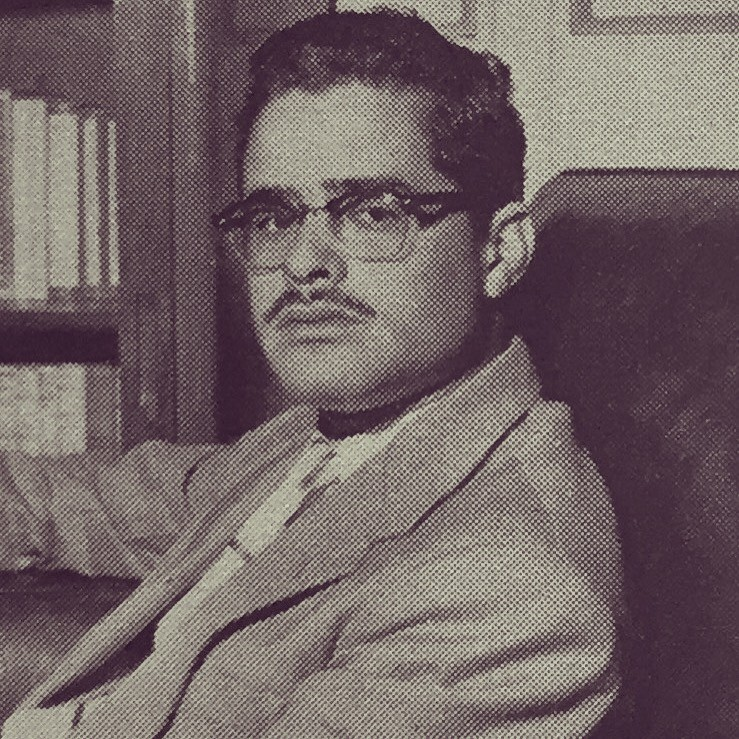
- Adriano González León in the mid-1950s.
- Born: November 14, 1931; Valera, Trujillo, Venezuela
- Died: January 12, 2008 (aged 76); Caracas, Venezuela
- Occupations: Novelist, Short story writer, Columnist, Broadcaster, Screenwriter, Actor, Cultural Attaché
- Writing career
- Genres: Realistic novel, Political

Adriano González León (Valera, Trujillo State, 14 November 1931 - Caracas, 12 January 2008) was a Venezuelan writer who is known in his country for the novel País Portátil (1968), widely regarded as the premier Venezuelan novel of the latter half of the 20th century, and for his many years of hosting a television program dedicated to promoting literary appreciation among the general public.

González León studied at the Central University of Venezuela (UCV) in Caracas. Politically active in his youth, in the 1950s he fought against the dictatorship of Marcos Pérez Jiménez. In the 1960s, from his position as a coeditor of the magazine Sardio, he supported revolutionary ideals then in fashion. He lectured for brief periods in literature and later economics at UCV, held minor diplomatic posts, edited literary magazines, and promoted literature appreciation through the television program. Near the end of his life, in 2004, PEN Venezuela and other organizations collaborated to pay homage to his opus and the stature he had achieved in the Venezuelan literary world by establishing a biennial literary prize in his name, dedicated to promoting the work of Venezuelan novelists. Honorees have included Milton Quero Arévalo in 2004 and Héctor Bujanda and Héctor Torres in 2006.

== Biography ==
=== Early life ===
At the age of fifteen, González León was an Andean region correspondent for the daily, El Nacional. He earned a law degree from the UCV. During the 1950s he was a leftwing militant in opposition to the dictatorship of Marcos Pérez Jiménez. At 24, while teaching literature at UCV, González, along with Juan Calzadilla, Guillermo Sucre, Edmundo Aray, Rodolfo Izaguirre, Efraín Hurtado, and others founded the group, Sardio, which published a magazine of the same name. The magazine Sardio featured highly politicized writers from a wide variety of backgrounds.

=== Literary career ===
His first forays into literature were as a short story writer. In 1956, won second prize in the annual short story competition sponsored by the Caracas daily newspaper, El Nacional for "El Lago" (The Lake). In three subsequent collections of short stories, he described somber, dramatic urban and rural environments.

The 1968 novel, País portátil, is an epic, set in González León's native Trujillo State, of the Barazarte family constructed out of the recollections of its youngest son, Andrés. The work was made into a film in 1979 under the same title (directed by Iván Feo and Antonio Llerandi).

Among the distinctions he was awarded are the Premio Nacional de Literatura (National Award for Literature) in 1980 and an honorary doctorate from Universidad Católica Cecilio Acosta (Unica) in Maracaibo in 2003.

He was a collaborator on the literary magazine, Letra Roja (Red Letter) and in a group of painters, sculptors, and writers, El Techo de la Ballena (The Roof of the Whale).

González León was long active as a popularizer of literature to the Venezuelan public. For 15 years he hosted a television show on literature, Contratema, on the Venezuelan government channel (Televisora Nacional, channel 5). After 2000, he returned to the daily, El Nacional, where he had been a teenage reporter, to write a weekly column. In 2006, he was one of four national authors who offered semester length courses in creative writing to the public, under a project called Escribas (this Spanish word means both "Scribes" and "May you write"). In the 1990s, while a diplomat in Spain, he had been a collaborator and presenter on a television based writing instruction program, Taller Abierto (Open Workshop) of Television Educativa Iberoamericana.

=== Other activities ===
In the 1960s, León was appointed the first secretary of the Venezuelan Embassy in Argentina. Upon returning to Venezuela, he worked as a professor in the Economics Department of UCV. In 1986, he played Tío Pancho in the Venezuelan film, Ifigenia. In the mid-1990s, served as a cultural attaché at the Venezuelan embassy in Spain.

== Works ==
=== Short stories ===
- 1957. Las hogueras más altas (The highest bonfires). Buenos Aires: Goyanarte, 1959. Winner of the Premio Municipal de Prosa.
- 1963. Asfalto-Infierno y otros relatos demoniacos. Caracas: El Techo de la Ballena.
- 1967. Hombre que daba sed. Buenos Aires: Jorge Álvarez.
- 1988. Linaje de árboles. Caracas: Planeta.
- 1998. Crónicas del rayo y de la lluvia. Caracas: Contexto Audiovisual-Pomaire.
- 1998. Todos los cuentos más Uno. Alfaguara.

=== Novels ===
- 1968. País portátil. Seix Barral. Winner of the Biblioteca Breve prize.
- 1995. Viejo. Alfaguara.

=== Poetry ===
- 1979. Damas
- 1980. De ramas y secretos. Caracas: Rayuela.
- 1997. Hueso de mis huesos (illustrated by Manuel Quintana Castillo). Caracas: Rayuela.

=== Other ===
- 1982. El libro de las escrituras (silkscreens of Marco Miliani); Ediciones de Galería Durban-Arte Dos, Caracas-Bogotá.
- 1985. Solosolo.
- 1996. El viejo y los leones (children's story). Caracas: Rayuela.
- 2001. Viento blanco. Caracas: Rayuela.

== See also ==
- Venezuela
- Venezuelan literature
- Latin American literature
