= Benjamín Rausseo =

Venezuelan artist and comedian

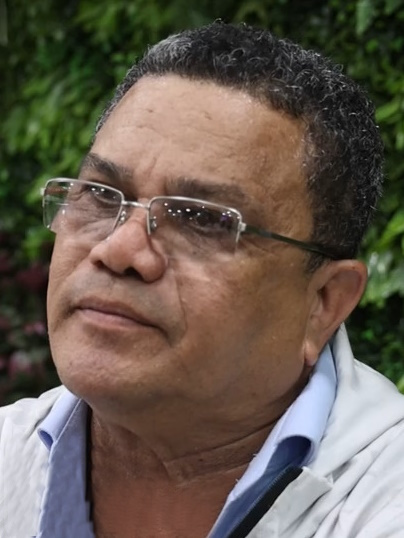
- Rausseo in 2024
- Born: Benjamín Rausseo Rodríguez; January 26, 1961 (age 65); Musipán, Monagas, Venezuela
- Other name: Er Conde Del Guácharo
- Notable work: Sabado Sensacional; Er Conde Jones

Comedy career
- Years active: 1985–present
- Medium: Stand-up, television,
- Genres: Character comedy, Observational comedy, Satire/Political satire, Blue comedy, Physical Comedy, Black comedy, Prop Comedy, Satire, Insult Comedy, Musical
- Subjects: Everyday life, current events, marriage, sex, political issues, dating, Hugo Chávez

Benjamín Rausseo Rodríguez (born January 26, 1961) is a Venezuelan artist, stand-up comedian and career humorist best known for his character Er Conde del Guácharo (translation: "The Count of Guacharo").

== Biography ==
Benjamín Rausseo was born into poverty in the rural community of Musipán in the state of Monagas. He pursued university studies as an actor and, in 1981, presented as his graduation thesis a comedic monologue "er Conde del Guácharo." The "Conde" or Count became a TV personality and made Rausseo one of Venezuela's most successful stand-up comedians. Beyond comedy he was also a dare-devil and stunt performer in the television variety show Sábado Sensacional. In 2006 Rausseo was studying law and was one semester from graduating with a JD from the Universidad Santa María de Caracas. Rausseo owns a theme park in Isla Margarita called Musipán.

== Presidential aspirations ==
In July 2006, he announced that he was running for president under his newly formed "Piedra Party," as a protest against the state of politics in Venezuela, and to challenge the presidency of Hugo Chávez.

Three weeks before the election, in accordance with a campaign pledge he had made earlier (to stand down if not placed first or second in the opinion polls), he withdrew his candidacy without endorsing either Chávez or Rosales, telling his supporters to vote for either.

Rausseo was an independent candidate in the 2024 Venezuelan presidential election. After the National Electoral Council (CNE) declared Nicolás Maduro the winner with 51.2% of the vote, Rausseo congratulated Maduro and called on the opposition parties to support dialogue, reunion and reconciliation.
