= 30th Lima Film Festival =

2026 film festival

- Official poster of the 30th Lima Film Festival
- Opening film: The Match
- Location: Lima, Peru
- Founded: 1997
- Awards: Trophy Spondylus: Six Months in a Pink and Blue Building
- Directors: Edward Venero
- Festival date: 6–15 August 2026
- Website: festivaldelima.com

Lima Film Festival
- 31st 29th

The 30th Lima Film Festival, organized by the Pontifical Catholic University of Peru, took place from 6–15 August 2026 in Lima, Peru. Argentine sports documentary film The Match, directed by Juan Cabral and Santiago Franco, served as the opening film for the festival.

The awards were announced on 16 August 2026, with Mexican film Six Months in a Pink and Blue Building, directed by Bruno Santamaría Razo, winning the Trophy Spondylus. How to Live with...? by Luisa García Alva won Best Film in the Peruvian Competition while Relict by Guillermo Quintero won for Best Documentary.

== Background ==
In late July 2026, the full lineup for the festival was announced. This years' motto is "We'll see each other" (Spanish: Vamos a vernos). The festival will be directed by Edward Venero, with Josué Méndez as the festival's artistic director. A new section titled Música was introduced, destined to films where music is a prominent theme.

Brazilian filmmaker Kleber Mendonça Filho and filmmaking duo Mariana Rondón and Marité Ugás are among this year's honorees. Additionally, Hungarian filmmaker Béla Tarr will also be honored with a special retrospective of his work.

== Official Selection ==
The lineup of titles selected for the official selection is as follows:

=== In Competition ===
==== Latin American Fiction ====
Highlighted title indicates award winner.

English Title	Original Title	Director(s)	Production Countrie(s)
The Anatomy of the Horses	La anatomía de los caballos	Daniel Vidal Toche	Peru, Spain, Colombia, France
The Condor Daughter	La Hija Cóndor	Álvaro Olmos Torrico	Bolivia, Peru, Uruguay
The Currents	Las corrientes	Milagros Mumenthaler	Argentina, Switzerland
Death Has No Master	La muerte no tiene dueño	Jorge Thielen Armand	Venezuela, Canada, Italy, Luxembourg
Flies	Moscas	Fernando Eimbcke	Mexico
Forever Your Maternal Animal	Siempre soy tu animal materno	Valentina Maurel	Belgium, France, Mexico
If I Were Alive	Se eu fosse vivo... vivia	André Novais Oliveira	Brazil
The Ivy	Hiedra	Ana Cristina Barragán	Ecuador, Mexico, France, Spain
The Night is Fading Away	La noche está marchándose ya	Ramiro Sonzini, Ezequiel Salinas	Argentina
On the Road	En el camino	David Pablos	Mexico
The Red Hangar	Hangar rojo	Juan Pablo Sallato	Chile, Argentina, Italy
The River Train	El tren fluvial	Lorenzo Ferro, Lucas A. Vignale	Argentina
November	Noviembre	Tomás Corredor	Mexico, Brazil, Norway, Colombia
Sad Girlz	Chicas tristes	Fernanda Tovar	Mexico, Spain, France
Six Months in a Pink and Blue Building	Seis meses en el edificio rosa con azul	Bruno Santamaría Razo	Mexico, Brazil, Denmark

==== Latin American Documentary ====
Highlighted title indicates award winner.

English Title	Original Title	Director(s)	Production Countrie(s)
Black Cocaine	Cocaína negra	Cristóbal Valenzuela	Chile, Uruguay
December	Diciembre	Lucas Gallo	Argentina, Uruguay
A Bigger Place	Un lugar más grande	Nicolás Défossé	Mexico, France
El coloquio de los pájaros		Sofía Velázquez Núñez	Peru
Comparsa		Vickie Curtis, Doug Anderson	Guatemala, United States
Jaripeo		Efraín Mojica, Rebecca Zweig	United States, France, Mexico
Our Body is an Expanding Star	Nuestro cuerpo es una estrella que se expande	Semillites Hernández Velasco, Tania Hernández Velasco	Mexico
Relict	Relicto	Guillermo Quintero	Colombia, France
A Street Named Cuba	Calle Cuba	Vanessa Batista	Cuba, Chile, Mexico
The Victors	Los vencedores	Pablo Aparo	Argentina
A Writing in Appearances	Una escritura en apariencias	Nicolás Cifuentes Gonzalez	Colombia, France

==== Peruvian Competition ====
Highlighted title indicates award winner.

English Title	Original Title	Director(s)	Production Countrie(s)
General States	Estados generales	Mauricio Freyre	Peru, Spain
The Girls Garden	Ellas	Eduardo Mendoza de Echave	Peru
How to Live with...?	Manuales de superviviencia	Luisa García Alva	Peru
Red Soil: An Audiovisual Ecopoetics of the Peruvian Amazon	Tierra roja: Ecopoética audiovisual de la amazonía peruana	Pedro Favarin	Peru
That Shadow Fading	Aquella sombra desvanecía	Samuel Urbina	Peru
Where Dreams Sleep	Donde duermen los sueños	Daniel Riglos	Peru
Where Shadows Are Born	Donde nacen las sombras	Violeta Rodríguez Ríos	Peru

=== Muestras ===
==== Opening film ====
English title	Original title	Director(s)	Production countrie(s)
The Match	El partido	Juan Cabral, Santiago Franco	Argentina

==== Acclaimed ====
English title	Original title	Director(s)	Production countrie(s)
Coward		Lukas Dhont	Belgium, France, Netherlands
Fatherland		Paweł Pawlikowski	Poland, Germany, Italy, France
Fjord		Cristian Mungiu	Romania, France, Denmark, Finland, Norway, Sweden
Hope	호프	Na Hong-jin	South Korea
The Man I Love		Ira Sachs	United States, France
Minotaur	Минотавр	Andrey Zvyagintsev	France, Latvia, Germany
The Odyssey		Christopher Nolan	United States, United Kingdom
Paper Tiger		James Gray	United States, Brazil, Italy
Parallel Tales	Histoires Parallèles	Asghar Farhadi	France, United States, Italy, Belgium
A Woman's Life	La Vie d'une Femme	Charline Bourgeois-Tacquet	France, Belgium

==== Out of competition ====
English title	Original title	Director(s)	Production countrie(s)
Being Hamlet	Ser Hamlet	Chela de Ferrari	Peru
Belén		Dolores Fonzi	Argentina
Comandante Fritz		Pavel Giroud	Spain, Germany
Lady Nazca		Damien Dorsaz	France, Germany
A Loose End	Un cabo suelto	Daniel Hendler	Uruguay, Argentina, Spain
Marching to Victory: The Route of the Bycenntenial	A paso de vencedores: La ruta del bicintenario	Natalia Sobrevilla Perea	Peru
Matapanki		Diego "Mapache" Fuentes	Chile

==== Preview Screenings ====
English title	Original title	Director(s)	Production countrie(s)
Colony	군체	Yeon Sang-ho	South Korea
The End of Oak Street		David Robert Mitchell	United States
Forgotten Island		Joel Crawford, Januel Mercado	United States
Holiness	Santidad	Rodolfo Espinoza Rios	Peru
The Invite		Olivia Wilde	United States
Saccharine		Natalie Erika James	Australia
Street Wanderers	Los caminantes de la calle	Juan Martín Hsu	Argentina, Peru

==== Cinema and music ====
English title	Original title	Director(s)	Production countrie(s)
Circular Ruins	Ruinas Circulares	Delia Ackerman	Peru
Let's Lose Our Heads	Vamos a perder la cabeza	Nicolás Saba Salem, Jorge Pablo Quiroz Salem	Peru
Q-POP		Adri Murguía	United States, Peru, South Korea
When No One Sees Me (episodes 1 and 2)	Cuando nadie me ve	Álvaro Ron	Spain

==== Cinema and gastronomy ====
English title	Original title	Director(s)	Production countrie(s)
Bunka Means Culture	Bunka significa cultura	Omar Young	United States
Ceviche: A Gastronomic Journey by Rodrigo Fernandini	Ceviche: Un viaje gastronomico de Rodrigo Fernandini	Fernando Landavere	Peru, Brazil
Food for Those in Need	Comida para quien la necesita	Leonardo Brant	Brazil
Jota Urondo, An Impertinent Chef	Jota Urondo, un cocinero impertinente	Mariana Erijimovich, Juan Villegas	Argentina

=== Retrospectives ===
English title	Original title	Director(s)	Production countrie(s)
Pictures of Ghosts (2023)	Retratos fantasmas	Kleber Mendonça Filho	Brazil
Neighboring Sounds (2012)	O som ao redor	Kleber Mendonça Filho	Brazil
Bacurau (2019)		Kleber Mendonça Filho	Brazil, France
At Midnight and a Half (1999)	A la media noche y media	Mariana Rondón	Venezuela, Peru, Mexico, France
Bad Hair (2013)	Pelo malo	Mariana Rondón	Venezuela, Germany, Peru, Argentina
Contactado (2020)		Marité Ugás	Peru, Venezuela, Brazil, Norway
It Would Be Night in Caracas (2025)	Aún es de noche en Caracas	Mariana Rondón, Marité Ugás	Mexico, Venezuela
Damnation (1988)	Kárhozat	Béla Tarr	Hungary
The Turin Horse (2011)	A torinói ló	Béla Tarr	Hungary
The Man from London (2007)	A londoni férfi	Béla Tarr	Hungary, France, Germany
Sátántangó (1994)		Béla Tarr	Hungary, Germany, Switzerland
Werckmeister Harmonies (2000)	Werckmeister harmóniák	Béla Tarr	Hungary
