= 29th Lima Film Festival =

2025 film festival

- Official poster of the 29th Lima Film Festival
- Opening film: Deaf
- Location: Lima, Peru
- Founded: 1997
- Awards: Trophy Spondylus: The Secret Agent
- Directors: Edward Venero
- Festival date: 7–16 August 2025
- Website: festivaldelima.com

Lima Film Festival
- 30th 28th

The 29th Lima Film Festival, organized by the Pontifical Catholic University of Peru, took place from 7–16 August 2025 in Lima, Peru. Spanish drama Deaf, directed by Eva Libertad, served as the festival's opening film.

The awards were announced on 16 August 2025, with Brazilian political thriller film The Secret Agent, directed by Kleber Mendonça Filho, winning the Trophy Spondylus. The Innocents by Germán Tejeda won Best Film in the Peruvian Competition while Under the Flags, the Sun by Juanjo Pereira won for Best Documentary.

== Background ==
In July 2025, the Lima Film Festival officially announced its 29th edition under the motto "Different perspective, one meeting point" (Spanish: Distintas miradas, un punto de encuentro) and revealed the complete lineup. The festival was organized by the Pontifical Catholic University of Peru and presented by the BBVA Foundation in Peru, the Ministry of Culture of Peru, the Gran Teatro Nacional del Perú, and in collaboration with PromPerú.

In its 29th edition, the film festival paid tribute to the careers of three distinguished personalities: Peruvian actress Haydeé Cáceres, Chilean actor Alfredo Castro, and executive from Programa Ibermedia Elena Vilardell.

== Juries ==
=== In Competition ===
==== Latin American Fiction ====
- Celina Murga, Argentine filmmaker, screenwriter, and producer
- Hebe Tabachnik, Argentine film director and screenwriter
- Natalia Ames, Peruvian academic
- Rodrigo Teixeira, Brazilian film producer
- Vinko Tomičić, Chilean film director

==== Latin American Documentary ====
- Heather Haynes, Canadian producer
- Jenny Velapatiño, Peruvian academic
- Néstor Frenkel, Argentine film director and editor

==== Peruvian Competition ====
- Estrella Araiza, Mexican cultural manager and director of the Guadalajara International Film Festival
- Giovanna Pollarolo, Peruvian poet and screenwriter
- Laura Astorga, Costa Rican film director

=== Fiction Cinematography ===
- Dariela Ludlow, Mexican director of photography
- Luisa Cavanagh, Argentine director of photography
- Patricio Fuster, Peruvian director of photography

=== International Critics ===
- Ivonete Pinto
- Luis Véles
- Marisol Aguila

=== PUCP Community ===
- Raschid Rabi Hirata
- Mariela del Águila Reátegui
- Gianela Kattya Ildefonso Lazo
- Rómulo Sulca Ricra
- Sandra Yulisa Tullume Limachi

=== Ministry of Culture of Peru ===
- Angie Bonino
- Peruska Chambi Echegaray
- Angela Ponce Romero

=== Peruvian Association of Film Press - APRECI ===
- Carolina Urdánegui
- Juan José Beteta
- Marcelo Paredes

=== Monseñor Luciano Metzinger Communicators Association - APC Signis Peru ===
- José Antonio Ulloa Cueva
- Mónica Villanueva Galdós
- Joaquín Portocarrero Guevara

=== Best LGTBIQ+ Film ===
- Romina Badoino
- Isa Abad Pinedo
- Gonzalo Rodríguez Risco

=== OIT - CINETRAB ===
- Teresa Torres
- Henry Vallejo
- Rossana Díaz Costa

=== Association of Female Film Directors of Peru - NUNA ===
- Sonia Llosa
- Mayella Lloclla
- Mariale Bernedo

== Official Selection ==
The lineup of titles selected for the official selection is as follows:

=== In Competition ===
==== Latin American Fiction ====
Highlighted title indicates award winner.

English Title	Original Title	Director(s)	Production Countrie(s)
The Night Without Me	La noche sin mí	María Laura Berch, Laura Chiarabrando	Argentina
Beloved Tropic	Querido trópico	Ana Endara	Panama, Colombia
The Barbarians	Los bárbaros	Javier Barbero, Martín Guerra	Peru, Spain
Zafari		Mariana Rondón	Peru, Mexico, Brazil, France, Chile, Dominican Republic, Venezuela
Sugar Island		Johanné Gómez Terrero	Dominican Republic, Spain
The Blue Trail	O Último Azul	Gabriel Mascaro	Brazil, Mexico, Chile, Netherlands
Designation of Origin	Denominación de origen	Tomás Alzamora Muñoz	Chile
Cuerpo celeste		Nayra Ilic García	Chile, Italy
A Poet	Un poeta	Simón Mesa Soto	Colombia, Germany, Sweden
The Devil Smokes (and Saves the Burnt Matches in the Same Box)	El diablo fuma	Ernesto Martínez Bucio	Mexico
Suçuarana		Clarissa Campolina, Sérgio Borges	Brazil
Punku		Juan Daniel Fernández Molero	Peru, Spain
The Secret Agent	O agente secreto	Kleber Mendonça Filho	Brazil, France, Netherlands, Germany
The Mysterious Gaze of the Flamingo	La misteriosa mirada del flamenco	Diego Céspedes	Chile, France, Germany
A House with Two Dogs	Una casa con dos perros	Matías Ferreyra	Argentina

==== Latin American Documentary ====
Highlighted title indicates award winner.

English Title	Original Title	Director(s)	Production Countrie(s)
The Prince of Nanawa	El príncipe de Nanawa	Clarisa Navas	Argentina, Paraguay, Colombia, Germany
Runa Simi		Augusto Zegarra	Peru
The Memory of Butterflies	La memoria de las mariposas	Tatiana Fuentes Sadowski	Peru, Portugal
Under the Flags, the Sun	Bajo las banderas, el sol	Juanjo Pereira	Paraguay, Argentina, United States, Panama, Germany
The Freedom of Fierro	La liberta de Fierro	Santiago Esteinou	Mexico, Canada, Greece
Soul of the Desert	Alma del desierto	Mónica Taboada-Tapia	Colombia, Brazil
Fate of Pines	Suerte de pinos	Lorena Muñoz	Argentina, Spain
Niñxs		Kani Lapuerta	Mexico, Germany
Night Has Come	Vino la noche	Paolo Tizón	Peru, Mexico, Spain
To the West, in Zapata	Al oeste, en Zapata	David Bim	Cuba, Spain
An Oscillating Shadow	Una sombra oscilante	Celeste Rojas Mugica	Chile, Argentina, France

==== Peruvian Competition ====
Highlighted title indicates award winner.

English Title	Original Title	Director(s)	Production Countrie(s)
Ashes, the Movie	Uchpa, la película	Antonio Rodríguez Romaní	Peru
Halfway Down the Street	A media calle	Eduardo Orcada	Peru
Intercontinental		Salomón Pérez	Peru
Family Politics	Políticas familiares	Martín Rebaza Ponce de León	Peru
Flor Pucarina, Rebel to the Bones	Flor Pucarina, rebelde hasta los huesos	Geraldine Zuasnabar	Peru
The Innocents	Los inocentes	Germán Tejeda	Peru, Mexico
1982		García JC	Peru
Astronaut	Astronauta	Paul Vega	Peru, Uruguay, Colombia

=== Muestras ===
==== Opening film ====
English title	Original title	Director(s)	Production countrie(s)
Deaf	Sorda	Eva Libertad	Spain

==== Acclaimed ====
English title	Original title	Director(s)	Production countrie(s)
Dreams (Sex Love)	Drømmer	Dag Johan Haugerud	Norway
The Mastermind		Kelly Reichardt	United States
Sentimental Value	Affeksjonsverdi	Joachim Trier	Norway, Germany, Sweden, Denmark, France
It Was Just an Accident	یک تصادف ساده / Un simple accident	Jafar Panahi	Iran, France, Luxembourg
Enzo		Robin Campillo	France, Italy, Belgium
Undercover	La infiltrada	Arantxa Echevarría	Spain
The Life of Chuck		Mike Flanagan	United States
Hard Truths		Mike Leigh	United Kingdom
Yes	Ken	Nadav Lapid	France, Israel, Cyprus, Germany
Promised Sky	Promis le ciel	Erige Sehiri	France, Tunisia, Qatar

==== Galas ====
English title	Original title	Director(s)	Production countrie(s)
Huaquero		Juan Carlos Donoso	Ecuador, Peru, Romania
Ramón and Ramón	Ramón y Ramón	Salvador del Solar	Peru, Spain, Uruguay
Mistura		Ricardo de Montreuil	Peru
Good Morning, Wiraqocha	Buenos días, Wiraqocha	Mauricio Godoy	Peru
Uyariy (Escuchar)		Javier Corcuera	Spain, Peru
Las muertes de Chantyorinti		Hermes Paralluelo	Peru, Spain
Amores perros		Alejandro González Iñárritu	Mexico
After 'Un buen día'	Después de un buen día	Néstor Frenkel	Argentina
All the Strength	Todas las fuerzas	Luciana Piantanida	Argentina, Peru
Hearth of the Wolf	El corazón del lobo	Francisco J. Lombardi	Peru

== Awards ==
The following awards were presented:

=== In Competition ===
==== Fiction ====
- Trophy Spondylus: The Secret Agent by Kleber Mendonça Filho
- Special Jury Prize: A Poet by Simón Mesa Soto
  - Honorable Mention: The Mysterious Gaze of the Flamingo by Diego Céspedes
- Best Director: Johanné Gómez Terrero for Sugar Island
- Best Screenplay: Tomás Alzamora Muñoz and Javier Salinas for Designation of Origin
- Best Actor: Ubeimar Ríos for A Poet
- Best Actress: Jenny Navarrete for Beloved Tropic
- Best Debut: The Mysterious Gaze of the Flamingo by Diego Céspedes

==== Fiction Cinematography ====
- Best Cinematography: Juan Sarmiento for A Poet
  - Special Mention: Johan Carrasco for Punku and Alván Prado for Sugar Island

==== Documentary ====
- Trophy Spondylus: Under the Flags, the Sun by Juanjo Pereira
  - Special Mention: Runa Simi by Augusto Zegarra

==== Peruvian Competition ====
- Best Film: The Innocents by Germán Tejeda
- Special Jury Prize: Family Politics by Martín Rebaza Ponce de León
- Best Director: Germán Tejeda for The Innocents

==== International Critics ====
- International Critics' Jury Award for Best Film: The Secret Agent by Kleber Mendonça Filho

==== Audience ====
- Audience Award: Runa Simi by Augusto Zegarra

==== PUCP Community ====
- PUCP Community Award for Made in Peru Best Film: 1982 by García JC

=== Other Awards ===
- Ministry of Culture Jury Award for Best Peruvian Film: The Memory of Butterflies by Tatiana Fuentes Sadowski
- International Labour Organization – CINETRAB Award for Best Fiction: Sugar Island by Johanné Gómez Terrero
- International Labour Organization – CINETRAB Award for Best Documentary: Runa Simi by Augusto Zegarra
- Peruvian Association of Film Press - APRECI Award for Best Film in Competition: A Poet by Simón Mesa Soto
- APC Signis Peru - Monseñor Luciano Metzinger Communicators Association Award: Beloved Tropic by || Ana Endara
- NUNA Award: The Prince of Nanawa by Clarisa Navas
