= Samantha Castillo =

Venezuelan actress (born 1980)

Samantha Castillo (born March 12, 1980, in Miranda, Venezuela) is a Venezuelan actress born in a small village near the capital Caracas. She has a degree in Performing Arts, graduated from the Central University of Venezuela and has been trained in different acting techniques, she also studied at the International Academy of Film and Television.

She has been acting since she was 15. She has appeared in several stage productions and became popular with the film Pelo Malo, a film by Mariana Rondon, winner of "Golden Shell (La Concha de Oro)" at the San Sebastián International Film Festival.

She also won the prize as best actress at Torino Film Festival 2013 where the jury president was Paolo Virzi.

The Venezuelan Film Academy recognized her as the best leading actress in 2018.

== Filmography ==
- 2013 - Pelo Malo (Bad Hair) directed by Mariana Rondón
- 2015 - Le Badanti (The Caretakes) by Marco Pollini
- 2015 - "El malquerido" (Dear Bad) directed by Diego Rísquez
- 2017 - "El Amparo" directed by Rober Calzadilla
- 2024 - Zafari directed by Mariana Rondón
