= 41st Guadalajara International Film Festival =

2025 film festival

- Official poster
- Opening film: Flies
- Location: Guadalajara, Jalisco, Mexico
- Awards: Mezcal Award: Dear Fátima; Best Ibero-American Film: The Red Hangar
- Festival date: 17–25 April 2026

Guadalajara International Film Festival
- 2027 2025

The 41st Guadalajara International Film Festival (FICG) took place from 17 to 25 April 2026, in Guadalajara, Jalisco, Mexico. The festival opened with the screening of the drama Flies, directed by Fernando Eimbcke.

The documentary film Dear Fátima, directed by Lorena Gutiérrez Rangel, Su Kim, Jesús Quintana Vega, Rodrigo Reyes, and Dawn Valadez, won the Mezcal Award for Best Mexican Film; Juan Pablo Sallato's international co-production The Red Hangar won Best Ibero-American Film; and Paula Cury's Scarlet Girls won Best Ibero-American Documentary Film.

== Background ==
Chile was chosen as the guest country of honor for the 41st edition. The festival will recognise filmmaker Darren Aronofsky and actress Luisa Huertas with, respectively the International Homage and the Mayahuel Mexican award. Ibermedia executive Elena Vilardell was announced as recipient of the FICG Industry Award, and Lola Dueñas as the recipient of the Maguey 'Trayectoria' Award.

The festival's poster was designed by illustrator Ricardo Luévanos and displays a central human gaze surrounded by weaver birds.

== Juries ==
=== Mezcal Award ===
- Santiago García, Mexican film producer
- Anita Lee, Canadian film programmer and festival director of Toronto International Film Festival
- María Guerra, Spanish journalist and film critic
- Paulina García, Chilean actress
- Ignacio Catoggio, Argentine producer and general coordinator of Secretaría Ejecutiva del Cine Iberoamericano (CAACI)

=== Ibero-American Film ===
- Mara Fortes, Mexican film researcher and curator of Telluride Film Festival
- Sandina Saravia, Uruguayan film producer
- Juan Antonio Vigar, director of Málaga Procultura
- Mayes C. Rubeo, Mexican costume designer

=== Ibero-American Documentary Film ===
- Celiana Cárdenas, Mexican cinematographer
- Consuelo Castillo, director of DOC:CO
- Beatriz Rosselot, Chilean producer and filmmaker

== Official Competition ==
=== Mezcal Award ===
The films picked up for the 'Premio Mezcal' selection are listed as follows:

Highlighted title indicates section's best film winner.

English Title	Original Title	Director(s)	Production countrie(s)
Celestino		Hans Bryssinck	Belgium; Mexico
City of the Dead	Ciudad de muertos	José Manuel Cravioto	Mexico
The Rest is Memory (MG)	Lo que nos van dejando	Issa García Ascot	Mexico
Oca		Karla Badillo	Mexico; Argentina
Missing (MG)	Se busca	Kenya Márquez	Mexico
I Am Mario (MG)	Soy Mario	Sharon Kleinberg	Mexico
The Son-in-Law	El yerno	Gerardo Naranjo González	Mexico
Mickey (MG)		Dano García	Mexico
The Same Blood	La misma sangre	Ángel Ricardo Linares Colmenares	Mexico
Our Body is an Expanding Star (MG)	Nuestro cuerpo es una estrella que se expande	Semillites Hernández Velasco, Tania Hernández Velasco	Mexico
Dear Fátima	Querida Fátima	Lorena Gutiérrez Rangel, Su Kim, Jesús Quintana Vega, Rodrigo Reyes, Dawn Valadez	Mexico; United States

(MG) indicates eligible for the Maguey Award, for films that include LGBTQ+ themes.

=== Ibero-American Feature Film ===
Highlighted title indicates section's best film winner.

English Title	Original Title	Director(s)	Production countrie(s)
18 Holes to Paradise	18 Buracos para o Paraíso	João Nuno Pinto	Portugal; Italy; Germany
Barrio triste		Stillz	Colombia; United States
The Black Snake	La Couleuvre noire	Aurélien Vernhes-Lermusiaux	France; Colombia; Brazil
The Red Hangar	Hangar rojo	Juan Pablo Sallato	Chile; Argentina; Italy
The Condor Daughter	La hija cóndor	Álvaro Olmos Torrico	Bolivia; Peru; Uruguay
Nunkui		Verenice Benitez	Ecuador; Chile; Germany
Another League (MG)	Pioneras	Marta Díaz de Lope Díaz	Spain; Portugal
Fuse	Precisamos Falar	Rebeca Diniz, Pedro Waddington	Brazil
He Who Returns	El regresado	Armando Capó	Cuba; Colombia
The Reborn	Los renacidos	Santiago Esteves	Argentina; Spain; Chile

(MG) indicates eligible for the Maguey Award, for films that include LGBTQ+ themes.

=== Ibero-American Documentary Feature Film ===
Highlighted title indicates section's best film winner.

English Title	Original Title	Director(s)	Production countrie(s)
The Fabulous Time Machine	A Fabulosa Máquina do Tempo	Eliza Capai	Brazil
Amílcar		Miguel Eek	Spain; Portugal; France; Sweden; Cabo Verde
Where the Silence is Heard	Aquí se escucha el silencio	Gabriela Pena, Picho García	Chile; Spain
A Street Named Cuba (MG)	Calle Cuba	Vanessa Batista	Chile; Cuba; Mexico
Flores para Antonio		Elena Molina, Isaki Lacuesta	Spain
LS83		Herman Szwarcbart	Argentina; Germany
Mailin		María Silvia Esteve	Argentina; France; Romania
Scarlet Girls	Niñas escarlata	Paula Cury	Dominican Republic; Mexico; Germany
The Seasons	As Estações	Maureen Fazendeiro	Portugal; France; Spain; Austria

(MG) indicates eligible for the Maguey Award, for films that include LGBTQ+ themes.

=== Ibero-American Short Film ===
Highlighted title indicates section's best film winner.

English Title	Original Title	Director(s)	Production countrie(s)
Agua fría		Meme Cabello, Antonia Martínez Valls	Chile
1974		José Esteban Pavlovich	Mexico
Ramón Who Speaks to Ghosts	Ramón, el que habla con fantasmas	Shervin Kermani	Mexico; Canada; Spain
Miriam		Karla Condado	Mexico
Loreto		Daniela Soria	Spain; Mexico
Replika		Piratá Waurá, Heloisa Passos	Brazil; United States; United Kingdom
Talk Me		Joecar Hanna	Spain; United States
Filme Pin		María Rojas Arias, Andrés Jurado	Colombia; Portugal
Apnea	Apneia	Thales Pessoa	Brazil
Before We Fade Away	Antes de que nos olviden	Sebastian Molina Ruiz	Mexico; Belgium
Bicycle Face	Cara de bicicleta	Amaia Nerekan Umaran, Itziar Zorita Agirre	Spain
Dead Tongue	Lengua muerta	José Jiménez	Chile
The Emancipation of Mimi	A emancipação de Mimi	Marcelo Pereira	Portugal
The End of Times	El final de los tiempos	Mao Osorio, Ismael Morales	Chile
The Gift	El regalo	Lara Izagirre Garizurieta	Spain
Grief	Luto	José Antonio Guayasamin	Ecuador; Canada
Meat	Vyann	Adolfo Margulis	Mexico
The Shadows of the Jaguar	Las manchas del jaguar	Ricardo del Conde	Spain
Three	Tres	Juan Ignacio Ceballos	Argentina
Time to Go	La hora de irse	Renzo Cozza	Argentina
The Veil	O Véu	Gabriel Motta	Brazil

=== International Animation Feature Film ===
Highlighted title indicates section's best film winner.

English Title	Original Title	Director(s)	Production countrie(s)
The Square	광장	Kim Bo-sol	South Korea
Heart of Darkness	Coração das trevas	Rogério Nunes	Brazil; France
The Last Blossom	ホウセンカ	Baku Kinoshita	Japan
My Friend the Sun	Mi amigo el sol	Alejandra Pérez González	Mexico; Brazil
The Treasure of Barracuda	El tesoro de Barracuda	Adrià García	Spain
Your Letter	연의 편지	Kim Yong-hwan	South Korea

=== Rigo Mora Award ===
Highlighted title indicates section's best film winner.

English Title	Original Title	Director(s)	Production countrie(s)
9 Million Colors		Bára Anna Stejskalová	Czech Republic; Norway; Germany
Mother's Child		Naomi Noir	Netherlands
Autokar		Sylwia Szkiłądź	Belgium; France
Merrimundi		Niles Atallah	Chile
Hurikán		Jan Saska	Czech Republic; France; Slovakia; Bosnia and Herzegovina
The Bear's River	La rivière des ourses	Anaïs Mauzat	Belgium
Dog Alone	Cão sozinho	Marta Reis Andrade	Portugal; France
God Is Shy	Dieu est timide	Jocelyn Charles	France
Hypersensitive	Hypersensible	Martine Frossard	Canada
Little Yellow	Amarillito	Luis Rentería	Mexico
Murmuration	Zwermen	Janneke Swinkels, Tim Frijsinger	Netherlands; Belgium
Once in a Body	Una vez en un cuerpo	María Cristina Pérez González	Colombia; United States
The Quinta's Ghost	El fantasma de la quinta	James A. Castillo	Spain
The Scarlet Tamagochi	El Tamagochi escarlata	Francisco Visceral Rivera	Chile
A Serious Thought	ÖÖmõtted	Jonas Taul	Estonia
With Tapes and Toasts in the Car	Im Auto Tapes Und Butterbrot	Kiana Naghshineh	Germany; France

=== Maguey Award ===
The following list consists of the films eligible for the Maguey Award that are not listed in the previous competition tables. The films in contention for both the Maguey Award and other competition section appear with the symbol (MG) next to it.

Highlighted title indicates section's best film winner.

English Title	Original Title	Director(s)	Production countrie(s)
No Dogs Allowed		Steve Bache	Germany
On the Sea		Helen Walsh	United Kingdom
Erupcja		Pete Ohs	United States; Poland
Iván & Hadoum		Ian de la Rosa	Spain; Germany; Belgium
Gugu's World	Feito Pipa	André Miranda	Brazil
I Am Going to Miss You	Eu Vou Ter Saudades de Você	Daniel Ribeiro	Brazil
Shelter	Cobijo	Adrián Silvestre	Spain
Two Dads, and Me	Yo tengo dos papás	Edgar Reyes	Mexico

=== Cine de Género ===
Highlighted title indicates section's best film winner.

English Title	Original Title	Director(s)	Production countrie(s)
Alpha		Julia Ducournau	France; Belgium
Motherwitch	Δωδεκάμερον	Minos Papas	Cyprus; North Macedonia; United States; Canada
The Awakening	El despertar	Jaime Osorio Márquez, José Luis Rugeles, Federico Durán Amorocho	Colombia
Street Wanderers	Los caminantes de la calle	Juan Martin Hsu	Argentina; Peru
Talking to a Stranger (HeJ)	Hablando con extraños	Adrián García Bogliano	Mexico

(HeJ) indicates film eligible for the Hecho en Jalisco Award.

=== Socio-Environmental Cinema Award ===
The following list consists of the films eligible for the Socio-Environmental Cinema Award that are not listed in the previous competition tables.

Highlighted title indicates section's best film winner.

English Title	Original Title	Director(s)	Production countrie(s)
Estados generales		Mauricio Freyre	Peru; Spain
Underland		Robert Petit	United States; United Kingdom
Lost for Words		Hannah Harper	France; United Kingdom
Kikuyu Land		Andrew H. Brown, Bea Wangondu	Kenya
Black Water		Natxo Leuza	Spain

=== Hecho en Jalisco ===
The following list consists of the films eligible for the Hecho en Jalisco that are not listed in the previous competition tables. The films in contention for both the Made in Jalisco and other competition section appear with the symbol (HeJ) next to it.

Highlighted title indicates section's best film winner.

English Title	Original Title	Director(s)	Production countrie(s)
Blooky: The Book Who Wanted to Be Read	Blooky: El librito que quería ser leído	Pablo Díaz de León Hicks	México; United States; Canada
Radiestesia		Jacinto Velasco	Mexico
The Topography of Bodies	Topografía de los cuerpos	Sergio Ruiz Velasco, Georgina Snaddon, Karina Russa	Mexico; Hungary; South Africa
Another Way of Being	Otro modo de ser	Olivia García Delgado	Mexico
Day of the Dead	Día de muertos	Brian Conley, Nathan Ives	Mexico; United States
Eleven Nine	Nueve once	Alejandro Flores	Mexico
Flowers	Flores	Job Samaniego Rivera	Mexico
The Honey and the Wound	O mel e a ferida	Sergio Ruiz Velasco	Mexico; Portugal
House Taken Over 96/26	Casa tomada 96/26	Alejandro Meludis	Mexico
The Liar's Circle (MG)	El círculo de los mentirosos	Nancy Cruz Orozco	Mexico
My Favorite Place	Mi lugar favorito	Alejandro Hidrogo Arechiga, Luis Zamarroni, Mariana Salazar, Sergio Campestre	Mexico
No Translation Required	No se requieren traducciones	Rafael José Altamira Carbajal	Mexico
One Two Three for You	Un dos tres por ti	Diana Castro Cabrera	Mexico
Since Always, Forever	Para toda la vida	Fernanda Camacho	Mexico
Us	Tu y yo	Néstor Orozco	Mexico
The Water Mark	La marca del agua	Diego Reynoso	Mexico
When I Get Home (MG)	Cuando llegue a casa	Edgar Adrián	Mexico
When I'm Older	Cuando sea grande	Pamela López Hernández	Mexico

(MG) indicates eligible for the Maguey Award, for films that include LGBTQ+ themes.

== Other sections ==
=== Charity Galas ===
The following films were selected for Mexican premieres in charity galas ('Galas a Beneficio') in the Sala Guillermo del Toro of the Cineteca Universidad de Guadalajara:

English Title	Original Title	Director(s)	Production countrie(s)
Orphan	Árva	László Nemes	Hungary; United Kingdom
Bros	Hermanos	Carol Rodríguez Colás, Marina Rodríguez Colás	Spain; Mexico; Belgium
Hold Onto Me	Κράτα Με	Myrsini Aristidou	Cyprus; Denmark; Greece; United States
Light Pillar	寒夜灯柱	Xu Zao	China
Deseo	Desire	Natalia López Gallardo	Spain; Mexico
Michael		Antoine Fuqua	United States
Obsession		Curry Barker	United States
Rebirth	Renacer	Gustavo Loza	Mexico
Rosebush Pruning (MG)		Karim Aïnouz	Italy; Germany; Spain; United Kingdom

(MG) indicates eligible for the Maguey Award, for films that include LGBTQ+ themes.

=== Chile, Guest of Honor ===
English Title	Original Title	Director(s)	Production countrie(s)
In the Shadow of the Sun (1974)	A la sombra del sol	Silvio Caiozzi, Pablo Perelman	Chile
Chile, el gran desafío (1973)		Álvaro Covacevich	Chile
Cien niños esperando un tren (1988)		Ignacio Agüero	Chile
Gracias a la vida (o la pequeña historia de una mujer maltratada) (1980)		Angelina Vázquez Riveiro	Finland
El Topo (1970)		Alejandro Jodorowsky	Mexico
Santa Sangre (1989)		Alejandro Jodorowsky	Mexico; Italy
The Holy Mountain (1973)	La montaña sagrada	Alejandro Jodorowsky	Mexico
Los perros (2017)		Marcela Said	Chile; France; Argentina; Portugal
Lemebel (2019)		Joanna Reposi Garibaldi	Chile; Colombia
Me rompiste el corazón (2025)		Boris Quercia	Chile
El viento sabe que vuelvo a casa (2016)		José Luis Torres Leiva	Chile
Al sur del invierno está la nieve (2025)		José Luis Torres Leiva	Chile
Bestia (2021)		Hugo Covarrubias	Chile
The Battle of Chile (1975)	La batalla de Chile	Patricio Guzmán	Chile; France; Cuba; Venezuela
Bear Story (2014)	Historia de un oso	Gabriel Osorio Vargas	Chile
Black Cocaine (2026)	Cocaína negra	Cristóbal Valenzuela	Chile; Uruguay
Designation of Origin (2024)	Denominación de origen	Tomás Alzamora	Chile
Jackal of Nahueltoro (1969)	El chacal de Nahueltoro	Miguel Littín	Chile
Jailbreak Pact (2020)	Pacto de fuga	David Albala	Chile

=== Tributes ===
English Title	Original Title	Director(s)	Production countrie(s)
Silver Mayahuel Lifetime Achievement Award: Luisa Huertas
Sin remitente (1995)		Carlos Carrera	Mexico
The Crime of Padre Amaro (2002)	El crimen del padre Amaro	Carlos Carrera	Mexico; Spain
We Shall Not Be Moved (2024)	No nos moverán	Pierre Saint-Martin	Mexico
International Mayahuel Award: Darren Aronofsky
Black Swan (2010)		Darren Aronofsky	United States
Mother! (2017)		Darren Aronofsky	United States
Requiem for a Dream (2000)		Darren Aronofsky	United States
International Mayahuel Award: Edgar Ramirez
Hands of Stone (2016)		Jonathan Jakubowicz	United States; Panama
International Mayahuel Award: Maite Alberdi
A Child of My Own (2026)	Un hijo propio	Maite Alberdi	Mexico
The Grown-Ups (2016)	Los niños	Maite Alberdi	Chile; France; Netherlands
The Mole Agent (2020)	El agente topo	Maite Alberdi	Chile; United States; Germany; Netherlands; Spain
Tea Time (2014)	La once	Maite Alberdi	Chile
Mayahuel FICG Industry Award: Elena Vilardell
La ciénaga (2001)		Lucrecia Martel	Argentina; Spain; France
Las razones del corazón (2011)		Arturo Ripstein	Mexico; Spain
Juan of the Dead (2011)	Juan de los muertos	Alejandro Brugués	Cuba; Spain
Ibero-American Mayahuel Award: Sebastián Lelio
Gloria (2013)		Sebastián Lelio	Chile
Ibero-American Mayahuel Award: Pablo Larraín
The Club (2015)	El club	Pablo Larraín	Chile

== Awards ==
Some of the awards conceded at the festival include:

=== Mezcal Award Competition ===
- Mezcal Award for Best Mexican Film: Dear Fátima
- Best Director: Lorena Gutiérrez Rangel, Su Kim, Jesús Quintana Vega, Rodrigo Reyes, Dawn Valadez (Dear Fátima)
- Best Technical-Artistic Achievement: Diego Tenorio (City of the Dead)
- Best Performance: Oustin de León (I Am Mario)
- Audience Award: Dear Fátima
- Young Jury Award: The Same Blood

=== Ibero-American Fiction Feature Film Competition ===
- Best Ibero-American Fiction Feature Film: The Red Hangar
- Best Director: Juan Pablo Sallato (The Red Hangar)
- Best Performance: Nicolás Zárate (The Red Hangar) and María Magdalena Sanizo (The Condor Daughter)
- Best Screenplay: Luis Emilio Guzmán (The Red Hangar)
- Best Debut Film: Barrio triste
  - Honorific Mention: Nunkui
- Best Technical-Artistic Achievement: The Red Hangar

=== Ibero-American Documentary Feature Film Competition ===
- Best Ibero-American Documentary Film: Scarlet Girls
  - Special Mention: Flores para Antonio
- Best Director: Paula Cury (Scarlet Girls)
- Best Technical-Artistic Achievement: The Fabulous Time Machine

=== Other official awards ===
- Best Ibero-American Short Film: Three
  - Special Mention: Replika
- Maguey Award for Best Film: Gugu's World
  - Special Mention: Our Body is an Expanding Star
- Maguey Jury Award: I Am Mario
- Maguey Award for Best Performance: Yuri Gomes and Teca Pereira (Gugu's World)
- Best Animated Film: Heart of Darkness
- Rigo Mora Award for Best Short Film: Once in a Body
  - Special Mention: The Quinta's Ghost
- Hecho en Jalisco Best Film Award: The Liar's Circle
- Hecho en Jalisco Best Short Film Award: My Favorite Place
- Socio-Environmental Cinema Award: Black Water
- Cine de Genero Award: Alpha
  - Special Menion: Motherwitch

=== Myscellaneous Awards ===
- FIPRESCI Award: Oca
- Latin American Critics' Award for European Films: The Love That Remains
