= Under the Flags, the Sun =

2025 Paraguayan documentary film

- International promotional poster
- Spanish: Bajo las banderas, el sol
- Directed by: Juanjo Pereira
- Screenplay by: Juanjo Pereira
- Produced by: Juanjo Pereira; Ivana Urizar; Gabriela Sabaté; Paula Zyngierman; Leandro Listorti
- Starring: Alfredo Stroessner
- Cinematography: Francisco Bouzas
- Edited by: Manuel Embalse
- Music by: Julián Galay; Andrés Montero Bustamante
- Production companies: Cine Mío; Bird Street Productions, Lardux Films, MaravillaCine, Sabate Films, Welt Film
- Distributed by: Cinephil
- Release dates: 17 February 2025 (Berlinale); 18 September 2025 (Paraguay)
- Running time: 90 minutes
- Countries: Paraguay; Argentina; United States; France; Germany
- Languages: Guarani; Spanish; German; French; English; Portuguese

Under the Flags, the Sun (Spanish: Bajo las banderas, el sol) is a 2025 documentary film written, co-produced and directed by Juanjo Pereira, in his debut feature. It follows a visual journey through the history of visual media in the 20th century, capturing its effects on the present-day Paraguay, a country where past regime's leaders memory still make waves.

The film had its world premiere at the Panorama section of the 75th Berlin International Film Festival on 17 February 2025, where it won FIPRESCI jury prize. It was selected as the Paraguayan entry for the Best International Feature Film at the 98th Academy Awards, but it was not nominated.

== Synopsis ==
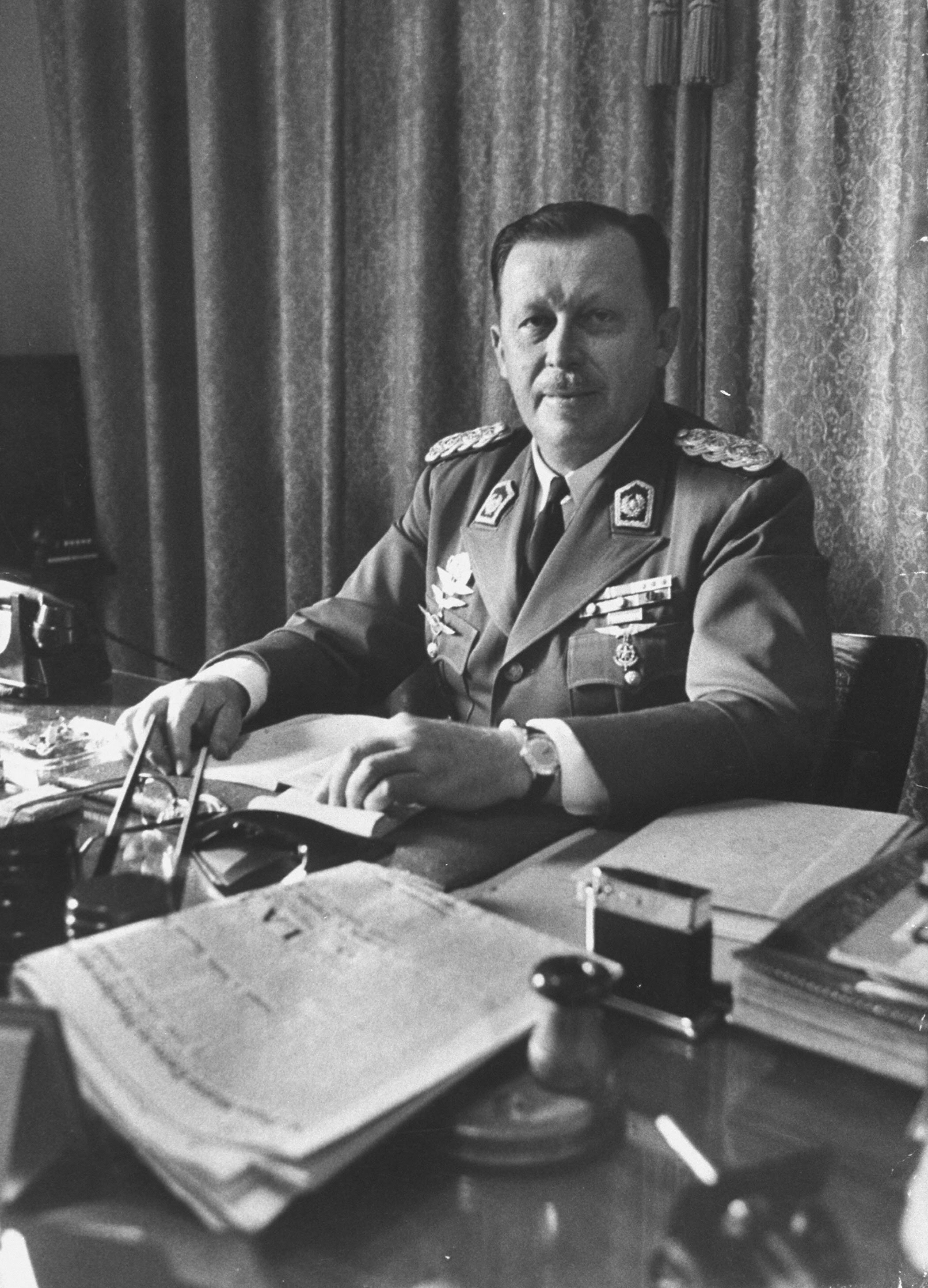
Alfredo Stroessner in 1959

In 1989, Paraguay's long dictatorship under Alfredo Stroessner ended after 35 years. When his regime collapsed, the government's media archives used to promote and glorify his rule, were abandoned and forgotten.

Decades later, a vast collection of recovered footage and documents from Paraguay and abroad was found which reveals how media was used to influence history, promote propaganda, and sustain authoritarian control. This film explores the hidden machinery behind Stroessner's regime, from domestic indoctrination to Cold War alliances, offering a striking visual journey through 20th-century media and its lasting impact on a nation still influenced by its authoritarian past.

== Production ==
The film received international funding throughout its production and post-production processes. In 2024, it won a third-place First Look award at the Pitch Forum of the Hot Docs Canadian International Documentary Festival. It also won the APORDOC Arché Award at the Doclisboa, first place at the Mercado Entre Fronteras (Gramado, Brazil), and was selected to participate in the MAFIZ at Málaga Film Festival. It was supported by: Ibermedia Program, Paraguayan National Audiovisual Institute (INAP), National Fund for Culture and the Arts (Fondec), Argentine National Institute of Cinema and Audiovisual Arts, IDFA Bertha Fund (Netherlands) and Aide aux Cinémas du Monde (France). It won the FIDBA Buenos Aires International Documentary Film Festival, Doc at the seventh MAFIZ, the industry area of the Málaga Film Festival in March 2024.

The film was made by Ivana Urízar, Paula Zyngierman and Leandro Listorti, Gabriela Sabaté, and Pereira. It was co-produced with Bird Street Production and Lardux Films, with Welt Film joining as an associate producer.

== Release ==
Under the Flags, the Sun had its world premiere at the 75th Berlin International Film Festival on February 17, 2025, in the Panorama Section.

On March 10, 2025, it competed in the International Competition at the 27th Thessaloniki Documentary Festival vying for the Golden Alexander. On 14 April 2025, it was presented in the 'Documentary Time' at the International Istanbul Film Festival. It also made it to a new section 'Political Studies', that "explores the influence of those in power on our reality and dissects their methods of action" at the 22nd Millennium Docs Against Gravity and was presented on 9 May 2025.

On 18 June, it was screened in the Memories Strands of the Sheffield DocFest for its United Kingdom premiere.

It also competed in Ciné+ Competition at the FIDMarseille in July 2025, and in Latin American Documentary section at the 29th Lima Film Festival on 12 August 2025.

In September the film was presented at the Camden International Film Festival on 12, and in the Zabaltegi-Tabakalera section of the 73rd San Sebastián International Film Festival on 24 September 2025.

The film is scheduled for commercial release on September 18, 2025, in Paraguayan theaters.

The film competed in the Awards Buzz – Best International Feature Film section of the 37th Palm Springs International Film Festival on 6 January 2026.

In February 2025, Cinephil acquired the international sales rights of the film. In August Icarus Films, a distributor of documentary films in North America, acquired the North American rights of the film.

== Reception ==
In his review at Berlinale, Marc van de Klashorst of the International Cinephile Society rated the film with 3.5 stars out of five and described it as "A somber film that is made for our times, but not for most of our audiences." Klashorst praised the climax shot of the film concluding the review, he wrote, that the film ends with a powerful image: just the feet of a huge statue of Stroessner, while the rest of it lies forgotten among other trash in a storage room. It's a sad story overall, but this final scene gives a sense of hope and feels very relevant to today's world.

== Accolades ==
| Award | Date | Category | Recipient | Result | Ref. |
|---|---|---|---|---|---|
| Berlin International Film Festival | 23 February 2025 | Panorama Audience Award for Best Feature Film | Under the Flags, the Sun | Nominated | |
| Berlin International Film Festival | 23 February 2025 | FIPRESCI Prize | Under the Flags, the Sun | Won | |
| Buenos Aires International Festival of Independent Cinema | 14 April 2025 | Grand Prize | Under the Flags, the Sun | Won | |
| Lima Film Festival | 16 August 2025 | Trophy Spondylus for Best Documentary | Under the Flags, the Sun | Won | |
| Doclisboa | 26 October 2025 | Cross-Sectional Competition: New Talent Award | Under the Flags, the Sun | Won | |

== See also ==
- List of submissions to the 98th Academy Awards for Best International Feature Film
- List of Paraguayan submissions for the Academy Award for Best International Feature Film
