= 21st Santiago International Film Festival =

2025 film festival

- Official poster.
- Opening film: It Was Just an Accident
- Location: Santiago, Chile
- Awards: Best Film: A Poet; Best Chilean Film: Al Sur del Invierno está la Nieve
- Directors: Carlos Núñez
- Festival date: August 17–24, 2025

Santiago International Film Festival
- 2026 2024

The 21st Santiago International Film Festival (SANFIC), organized by Fundación CorpArtes, took place from August 17 to 24, 2025. Jafar Panahi's Palme d'Or winner It Was Just an Accident served as the opening film for the festival, while the Spanish-Argentine film Queen of Coal, directed by Agustina Macri, closed the festival.

Colombian drama film A Poet, directed by Simón Mesa Soto, received the main prize within the International Competition, while Al Sur del Invierno está la Nieve, directed by Sebastián Vidal Campos won the main award for the Chilean Films section.

== Background ==
The complete lineup was announced on July 31. Spanish director Álex de la Iglesia was honored with a Lifetime Achievement Award at the festival's opening ceremony, while a retrospective section was dedicated to his filmography with screenings of four of his films. The festival's official poster was designed by Chilean illustrator Alberto Montt, inspired in the works of Argentine cartoonist Quino.

The festival was directed by Carlos Núñez. Screenings took place at three venues: Sala Centro Arte Alameda, Sala Parque Arauco and Cinépolis La Reina (La Reina).

== Juries ==
=== International Competition ===
- Mariana Rondón, Venezuelan film director, screenwriter, producer and visual artist
- Bernardo Bergeret, Uruguayan curator and founder of Ventana Sur and Blood Window
- Mariana Di Girolamo, Chilean actress

=== Chilean Film Competition ===
- Paulina Obando, Chilean producer and professor
- Jana Wolff, Head of Marketing & Advertising at the European Film Market in Berlin
- Carlos Marqués-Marcet, Spanish film director, screenwriter and film editor

=== Chilean Short Film Competition ===
- Clemente Rodríguez, Chilean actor
- Maud Amson, Director of Sales & Operations at the Cannes Marché du Film
- Thea Ehre, Austrian actress

== Official selections ==
The following films were selected for the official competitions and other sections:

=== International Film Competition ===
Highlighted title indicates section's best film winner.

| English title | Original title | Director(s) | Production countrie(s) |
|---|---|---|---|
| They Will Be Dust | Polvo serán | Carlos Marqués-Marcet | Spain, Switzerland, Italy |
| Cuerpo Celeste | | Nayra Ilic García | Chile, Italy |
| Runa Simi | | Augusto Zegarra | Peru |
| That Summer in Paris | Le rendez-vous de l'été | Valentine Cadic | France |
| A Poet | Un poeta | Simón Mesa Soto | Colombia, Germany, Sweden |
| Beloved Tropic | Querido trópico | Ana Endara | Panama, Colombia |
| The Portuguese House | Una quinta portuguesa / A Quinta | Avelina Prat | Spain, Portugal |
| Monstruo de Xibalba | | Manuele Irene | Mexico |

=== Chilean Film Competition ===
Highlighted title indicates section's best film winner.

| English title | Original title | Director(s) | Production countrie(s) |
|---|---|---|---|
| Los Renacidos | | Santiago Esteves | Argentina, Chile, Spain |
| Si Vas Para Chile | | Amilcar Infante, Sebastián González | Chile |
| Lo Que No Se Dijo | | Ricardo Valenzuela Pinilla | Chile, Colombia |
| Zafari | | Mariana Rondón | Peru, Mexico, Brazil, France, Chile, Dominican Republic, Venezuela |
| La Quinta | | Silvina Schnicer | Argentina, Brazil, Chile, Spain |
| Kaye | | Juan Cáceres | Chile |
| After the Fog | Después de la Niebla | Miriam Heard | Chile, United Kingdom, France |
| Al Sur del Invierno está la Nieve | | Sebastián Vidal Campos | Chile |

=== Chilean Short Film Competition ===
Highlighted title indicates section's best film winner.

| English title | Original title | Director(s) | Production countrie(s) |
|---|---|---|---|
| Laurita | | Sebastián Soto Salas | Chile |
| Proyecto de Verano | | Rocío Huerta, Paz Ramírez | Chile |
| Feliz Cumpleaños Lucía | | Patricio Alfaro | Chile |
| Atardecer en América | | Matías Rojas Valencia | Chile, Brazil |
| Trascender | | Vicente Bustos Silva | Chile |
| Lo Que Fue Nuestro Hogar | | Angelo Lobos | Chile |
| Días de Verano | | Fiora Salas-Román | Chile |
| El Sacrificio de las Luciernagas | | Giancarlo Bozzi Álvarez | Chile |
| En las Estrellas Bailan los Perros | | Raimundo Bucher, Constanza Barrios, Matías Yunge, Florencia de la Maza | Chile |
| Masivo | | Ignacio Pavez | Chile |
| Futura Licenciada | | Samantha Copano, Florencia Peña | Chile |
| No Sy Tuyo | | Cristina Sitja Rubio | Chile, Germany |
| Mamita Linda | | Juan Bautista Tagle, Joaquín Nercasseau | Chile |
| Life Invisible | | Bettina Perut, Iván Osnovikoff | Chile, United Kingdom, Sweden |
| Un Lugar para ver el Fin del Mundo | | Guille Söhrens | Chile |
| Fantasmas de Vidas Futuras | | Antonia Monserrat, Ricardo Alfonso López | Chile |
| Lost Call | | Sergio Allard | Chile, United States |
| Morfología Underground | | Sidka Saavedra | Chile, Argentina |
| Baldías | | Julieta Acuña | Chile |
| Úrsula | | Edison Cájas | Chile |
| Medianoche | | Diego Ayala | Chile |

=== Masters of Cinema ===
The following films were selected for the Masters of Cinema (Maestros del Cine) section, dedicated to films by prestigious filmmakers from around the world:

| English title | Original title | Director(s) | Production countrie(s) |
|---|---|---|---|
| The Wave | La ola | Sebastián Lelio | Chile, United States |
| It Was Just an Accident (opening film) | یک تصادف ساده / Un simple accident | Jafar Panahi | Iran, France, Luxembourg |
| Meet the Barbarians | Les barbares | Julie Delpy | France |
| Alpha | | Julia Ducournau | France, Belgium |
| When Fall Is Coming | Quand vient l'automne | François Ozon | France |
| The Flats | | Alessandra Celesia | Ireland, France, Belgium, United Kingdom |
| The Mastermind | | Kelly Reichardt | United States, United Kingdom |
| Ariel | | Lois Patiño | Spain, Portugal |
| Diamonds | Diamanti | Ferzan Özpetek | Italy |
| The Light | Das Licht | Tom Tykwer | Germany, France |

=== Visions of the World ===
The following films were selected for the Visions of the World (Visiones del Mundo) section, dedicated to feature films and documentaries from around the world:

| English title | Original title | Director(s) | Production countrie(s) |
|---|---|---|---|
| Die Unbeugsamen 2 - Guten Morgen, Ihr Schönen! | | Torsten Körner | Germany |
| Todas las Fuerzas | | Luciana Piantanida | Argentina, Peru |
| Jano & Dafi | | Camilo Erazo | Chile |
| Frisch | | Damian John Harper | Germany |
| Punku | | J. D. Fernández Molero | Peru, Spain |
| The Last Taboo | | Manfred Oldenburg | Germany, United Kingdom, United States, Czech Republic |
| Lovers in the Sky | Amantes en el Cielo | Fermín de la Serna | Argentina, Germany, United States |
| A Bright Future | Un Futuro Brillante | Lucía Garibaldi | Uruguay, Argentina, Germany |
| Minha Terra Estrangeira | | Colectivo Lakapoy, João Moreira Salles, Louise Botkay | Brazil |
| Before/After | Avant/Après | Manoël Dupont | Belgium |

=== Directors in Focus ===
The following films were selected for the Directors in Focus (Directoras en Foco) section, dedicated to films made by female filmmakers from around the world:

| English title | Original title | Director(s) | Production countrie(s) |
|---|---|---|---|
| Jone, Sometimes | Jone, batzuetan | Sara Fantova | Spain |
| The Empty Grave | Das leere Grab | Agnes Lisa Wegner, Cece Mlay | Germany, Tanzania |
| La Fábula de la Tortuga y la Flor | | Carolina Campo Lupo | Uruguay |
| Reproduction | Reproduktion | Katharina Pethke | Germany |
| Shahid | | Narges Kalhor | Germany |
| Alicia Bajo la Higuera | | Manuela Thayer | Chile |

=== Special Screenings ===
| English title | Original title | Director(s) | Production countrie(s) |
|---|---|---|---|
| Millonario | | José Isla, Felipe Isla | Chile |
| Lo Que Trajo la Marea | | Patricio Valladares | Chile |
| Velados Transparentes | | Coti Donoso | Chile |
| Poirot, Último Testigo | | Francesc Relea | Chile, Spain |
| Queen of Coal (closing film) | Miss Carbón | Agustina Macri | Spain, Argentina |
| The Flamenco Guitar of Yerai Cortés | La guitarra flamenca de Yerai Cortés | Antón Álvarez | Spain |

=== Retrospective ===
| English title | Original title | Director(s) | Production countrie(s) |
|---|---|---|---|
| The Day of the Beast (1995) | El día de la bestia | Álex de la Iglesia | Spain, Italy |
| Perdita Durango (1997) | | Álex de la Iglesia | Spain, United States, Mexico |
| Common Wealth (2000) | La comunidad | Álex de la Iglesia | Spain |
| Crimen Ferpecto (2004) | | Álex de la Iglesia | Spain, Italy |

=== Sanfic EDUCA ===
The following films were selected for the SANFIC EDUCA, dedicated to fiction, documentary and animation films with themes related to children, youth and families:

| English title | Original title | Director(s) | Production countrie(s) |
|---|---|---|---|
| Gouzou Ousa Ou Lé? | | Romain Vacher | France |
| We, Students! | Nous, Etudiants! | Rafiki Fariala | Central African Republic, France, Democratic Republic of Congo, Saudi Arabia |
| La Cascada | | Pablo Delgado | Mexico |
| The Goose | | Jan Míka | Czech Republic |
| What the Finn?!: Summer of Surprises | Kannawoniwasein?! | Stefan Westerwell | Germany |
| Checker Tobi and the Journey to the Flying Rivers | Checker Tobi und die Reise zu den fliegenden Flüssen | Johannes Honsell | Germany |
| Montsouris Park | Montsouris | Guil Sela | France |
| A Tiny Voyage | Le Tout petit voyage | Emily Worms | France, Switzerland |
| Cielo Roto | | Natacha Mora | Costa Rica |
| Nostalgia para el Lago | | Arturo Maciel | Paraguay, Peru, Spain |
| Un Pájaro Voló | | Leinad Pájaro de la Hoz | Colombia, Cuba |
| Ana Morphose | | João Rodrigues | Portugal |
| Un Reino para Todos Nosotros | | Miguel Ángel Uriegas | Mexico, Colombia |
| Ángel y Perla | | Denise Anzarut, Jenni Merla | Argentina |
| The Bertrand's Farm | La Ferme des Bertrand | Gilles Perret | France |
| Hormiguilla | | Fran Granada | Spain |

== Awards ==
The following awards were given:

=== International Competition ===
- Best Film: A Poet by Simón Mesa Soto
- Special Jury Mention for Best Film: Runa Simi by Augusto Zegarra
- Best Director: Simón Mesa Soto for A Poet & Carlos Marqués-Marcet for They Will Be Dust
- Best Performance: Angela Molina and Alfredo Castro for They Will Be Dust & Franklin Aro for The Dog Thief (ex aequo)

=== Chilean Film Competition ===
- Best Film: Al Sur del Invierno está la Nieve by Sebastián Vidal Campos
- Best Director: Silvina Schnicer for La Quinta
- Best Performance: Daniela Ramírez for Zafari
  - Special Jury Mention for Best Performance: Patricia Cuyul for Lo Que No Se Dijo
- Special Jury Mention: Zafari by Mariana Rondón

=== Chilean Short Film Competition ===
- Best Short Film: Futura Licenciada by Samantha Copano and Florencia Peña
  - Special Jury Mention: Baldías by Julieta Acuña
  - Special Jury Mention: Morfología Underground by Sidka Saavedra
