= Sugar Island (film) =

- Theatrical release poster
- Directed by: Johanné Gómez Terrero
- Written by: Johanné Gómez Terrero; María Abenia
- Produced by: David Baute; Fernando Santos Diaz
- Starring: Yelidá Díaz
- Cinematography: Alván Prado
- Edited by: Raúl Barreras
- Music by: Jonay Armas
- Production companies: Guasábara Cine; Tinglado Films
- Release dates: September 5, 2024 (Venice); May 21, 2025 (Spain); May 29, 2025 (Dominican Republic)
- Running time: 91 minutes
- Countries: Dominican Republic; Spain
- Languages: Haitian Creole; Spanish

Sugar Island is a 2024 coming-of-age drama film co-written and directed by Johanné Gómez Terrero. It stars Yelidá Díaz as Makenya, a 14-year-old Dominican-Haitian teenager who lives in a sugarcane community and is forced to begin her journey to adulthood after becoming pregnant.

== Synopsis ==
Makenya is a 14-year-old teenager who, after becoming pregnant, is forced to grow up by her family's fury, while her grandfather joins the protests for the right to a pension and a group of women rescue the history of their slave ancestors.

== Cast ==
- Yelidá Díaz as Makenya
- Juan Maria Almonte as Grandfather
- Diogenes Medina as Leroi
- Ruth Emeterio as Filomena
- Xiomara Rodríguez as Doctor
- Francis Cruz as The Seller
- Génesis Piñeyro as Yelidá
- Keven Carvajal as Chinese in the chicken
- Marivel Contreras

== Production ==
Principal photography took place in San Pedro de Macorís, Dominican Republic.

== Release ==
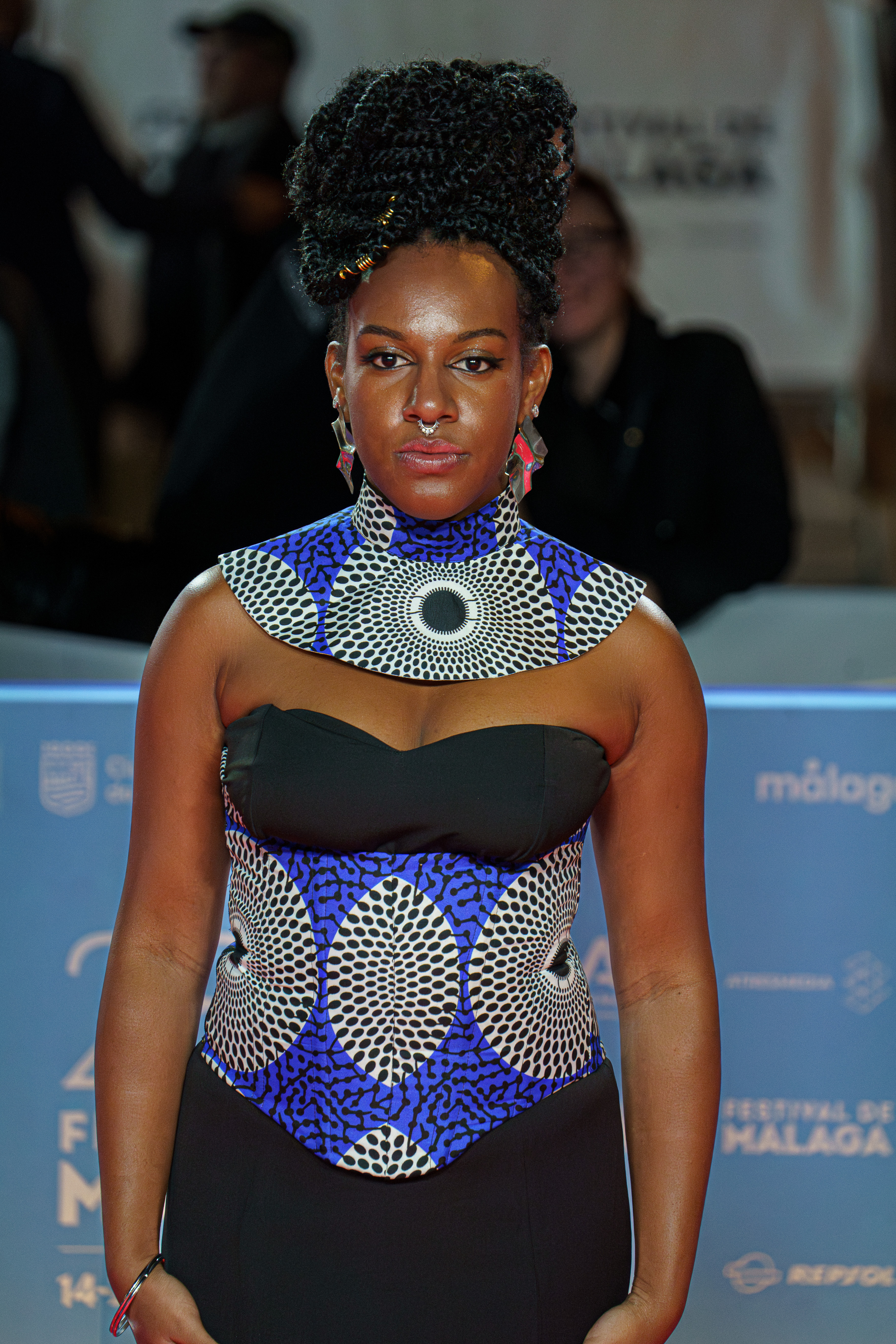
Yelidá Díaz attending the 2025 Málaga Film Festival.

Sugar Island had its world premiere on September 5, 2024, at the 81st Venice International Film Festival, then screened on October 18, 2024, at the 68th BFI London Film Festival, on November 6, 2025, at the 65th Thessaloniki International Film Festival, on November 9, 2025, at the 35th Stockholm International Film Festival, on November 12, 2025, at the 73rd International Filmfestival Mannheim-Heidelberg, on March 19, 2025, at the 28th Málaga Film Festival, on June 21, 2025, at the 27th Taipei Film Festival, and on August 24, 2025, at the 29th Lima Film Festival. Patra Spanou Film acquired international sales rights.

The film was released commercially on March 21, 2025 in Spanish theaters, and a limited theatrical release on May 29, 2025, in the Dominican Republic.

== Accolades ==
Year	Award / Festival	Category	Recipient	Result	Ref.
2024	81st Venice International Film Festival	GdA Director's Award	Sugar Island	Nominated	
2024	81st Venice International Film Festival	Edipo Re Award - Special Mention	Sugar Island	Won	
2024	81st Venice International Film Festival	Ca' Foscari Young Jury Award	Sugar Island	Won	
2024	65th Thessaloniki International Film Festival	Golden Alexander	Sugar Island	Nominated	
2024	65th Thessaloniki International Film Festival	WIFT GR Award	Sugar Island	Won	
2024	73rd International Filmfestival Mannheim-Heidelberg	International Competition - Audience Award	Sugar Island	Nominated	
2024	45th Havana Film Festival	Best Fiction Feature Film	Sugar Island	Nominated	
2024	45th Havana Film Festival	Coral Award for Artistic Contribution	Sugar Island	Won	
2025	24th Geneva International Film and Forum Festival on Human Rights	Gran Prix de Genève	Sugar Island	Nominated	
2025	24th Geneva International Film and Forum Festival on Human Rights	Mention Spéciale del Gran Prix de Genève	Sugar Island	Won	
2025	28th Málaga Film Festival	Best Latin-American Film	Sugar Island	Nominated	
2025	28th Málaga Film Festival	Best Cinematography	Alván Prado	Won	
2025	15th Beijing International Film Festival	Forward Future Award - Best Director	Johanné Gómez Terrero	Won	
2025	27th Taipei Film Festival	New Talents - Grand Prize	Sugar Island	Nominated	
2025	14th BlackStar Film Festival	Best Feature Narrative Award	Sugar Island	Won	
2025	29th Lima Film Festival	Trophy Spondylus	Sugar Island	Nominated	
2025	29th Lima Film Festival	Best Director	Johanné Gómez Terrero	Won	
2025	29th Lima Film Festival	Best Cinematography - Special Mention	Alván Prado	Won	
2025	29th Lima Film Festival	CINETRAB Award for Best Fiction	Sugar Island	Won	
