= Zafari (film) =

- Theatrical release poster
- Directed by: Mariana Rondón
- Written by: Mariana Rondón; Marité Ugás
- Produced by: Jorge Hernandez Aldana; Juliette Lepoutre; Pierre Menahem; Giancarlo Nasi; Sterlyn Ramírez; Mariana Rondón; Rafael Sampaio; Marité Ugas; Cristina Velasco
- Starring: Daniela Ramírez; Francisco Denis; Samantha Castillo
- Cinematography: Alfredo Altamirano
- Edited by: Isabela Monteiro de Castro
- Music by: Pauchi Sasaki
- Production companies: Sudaca Films; Paloma Negra Films; Still Moving; Klaxon Cultura Audiovisual; Don Quijote Films; Selene Films; Artefactos S.F
- Release dates: September 22, 2024 (Zinemaldia); August 28, 2025 (Peru); September 4, 2025 (Venezuela & Chile)
- Running time: 100 minutes
- Countries: Venezuela; Peru; Mexico; France; Chile; Dominican Republic; Brazil
- Language: Spanish

Zafari is a 2024 dystopian black comedy-drama film co-written, co-produced and directed by Mariana Rondón. It stars Daniela Ramírez, Francisco Denis and Samantha Castillo. The film follows an upper-class family who witness the arrival of a hippopotamus named Zafari, who is the only one with enough food, while they are starving. It is an international co-production between Venezuela, Peru, Mexico, France, Chile, the Dominican Republic and Brazil.

== Synopsis ==
The neighbors witness the arrival of the hippopotamus Zafari at a small zoo. Ana, Edgar, and their son Bruno watch the operation from the windows of their decaying luxury building, now in ruins. Amidst the lack of food, water, and electricity, the family tries to solve everyday problems while thinking of a way to escape. In a world gone wild, Zafari is the only one who still has enough to eat.

== Cast ==
- Daniela Ramírez as Ana
- Francisco Denis as Edgar
- Samantha Castillo as Natalia
- Varek La Rosa as Bruno
- Alí Rondón as Ali
- Beto Benites as Flaco
- Claret Quea as Mataperro
- Juan Carlos Colombo as Francisco

== Production ==
Principal photography took place on location in Lima, Peru, the Dominican Republic, and Mexico.

== Release ==
The film had its world premiere on September 22, 2024, at the 72nd San Sebastián International Film Festival, then screened on October 27, 2024, at the 48th São Paulo International Film Festival, on March 19, 2025, at the 4th LATcinema Fest, on March 22, 2025, at the 39th Fribourg International Film Festival, on March 23, 2025, at the 37th Toulouse Latin America Film Festival, on July 21, 2025, at the 14th Aegean Film Festival, on August 8, 2025, at the 29th Lima Film Festival, and on August 19, 2025, at the 21st Santiago International Film Festival.

The film was commercially released on August 28, 2025, in Peruvian theaters, and on September 4 of the same year in Venezuelan and Chilean theaters.

== Accolades ==
Year	Award / Festival	Category	Recipient	Result	Ref.
2024	72nd San Sebastián International Film Festival	Horizontes Latinos Award	Zafari	Nominated	
2024	33rd Biarritz Film Festival	FBAL Award for Feature Film from the French Union of Film Critics	Zafari	Won	
2024	29th International Film Festival of Kerala	Best International Film	Zafari	Nominated	
2025	39th Fribourg International Film Festival	Grand Prix	Zafari	Nominated	
2025	42nd Munich International Film Festival	CineRebels Award	Zafari	Nominated	
2025	29th Lima Film Festival	Trophy Spondylus	Zafari	Nominated	
2025	21st Santiago International Film Festival	Chilean Film Competition - Best Film	Zafari	Nominated	
2025	21st Santiago International Film Festival	Special Mention for Best Film	Zafari	Won	
2025	21st Santiago International Film Festival	Best Performance	Daniela Ramírez	Won	
