= Astronaut (2025 film) =

Astronauta
- Colombian theatrical release poster
- Spanish: Astronauta
- Directed by: Paul Vega
- Written by: Paul Vega
- Produced by: Paul Vega; Jorge Constantino; Guillermo Blanco; Álvaro Gutiérrez; Nicolás Valdés; Marcela Avalos
- Starring: Daniel Hendler
- Cinematography: Mario Bassino
- Edited by: Eduardo "Chino" Pinto; Emiliano León Podestá
- Music by: Hernán González Villamil; Gabriel Casacuberta Guemberena
- Production companies: Tondero Producciones; G57 Films; Circular Media; Amada Contents
- Release dates: February 20, 2025 (Punta del Este); May 8, 2025 (Colombia); July 31, 2025 (Uruguay); August 14, 2025 (Peru)
- Running time: 80 minutes
- Countries: Peru; Colombia; Uruguay
- Language: Spanish

Astronaut (Spanish: Astronauta) is a 2025 drama film written, co-produced and directed by Paul Vega in his directorial debut. Starring Daniel Hendler accompanied by Angie Cepeda, Salvador del Solar, Gustavo Bueno, Marco Zunino, Fiorella Luna, Miguel Iza, Emilram Cossio, Claudia Berninzon and Bernardo Scarpella.

== Synopsis ==
Nicolás, a well-known 43-year-old TV host married to photographer Claudia, feels disenchanted with his career. He appears to have a successful life at work and in love. As he begins to secretly write a short story, he meets an old soul who leads him to question his monotonous life by telling him fantastical tales. Meanwhile, he is about to move into the wonderful new house he and his wife have bought, trying to hide the growing distance between them and acknowledging his lingering needs. Thanks to this new and strange presence in his life, the landlord, and the rediscovery of his old love for writing, Nicolás will search for true happiness.

== Cast ==
- Daniel Hendler as Nicolás
- Angie Cepeda as Claudia
- Salvador del Solar as Javier
- Gustavo Bueno as Ernesto
- Marco Zunino
- Fiorella Luna
- Miguel Iza
- Emilram Cossio
- Claudia Berninzon
- Bernardo Scarpella

== Production ==
Principal photography began on March 26, 2023, and wrapped on April 20 of the same year in Lima, Peru.

== Release ==
Astronauta premiered worldwide on February 20, 2025, as the closing film of the 27th Punta del Este International Film Festival, and was screened on August 10, 2025, at the 29th Lima Film Festival.

It was commercially released on May 8, 2025, in Colombian theaters, on July 31, 2025, in Uruguayan theaters, and on August 14, 2025, in Peruvian theaters.

== Accolades ==
Award / Festival	Date of ceremony	Category	Recipient(s)	Result	Ref.
Lima Film Festival	16 August 2025	Peruvian Competition - Best Film	Astronaut	Nominated	
