= The Innocents (2025 film) =

2025 film by Germán Tejada

- Promotional release poster
- Spanish: Los inocentes
- Directed by: Germán Tejada
- Screenplay by: Christopher Vásquez; Germán Tejada
- Based on: "Los inocentes" by Oswaldo Reynoso
- Produced by: Lorena Ugarteche; Paulina Villavicencio; Marco Antonio Salgado
- Starring: Diego Cruchaga Ponce; Fabián Calle; José Miguel Chuman; Grecia Pino; José Masías
- Cinematography: Julián Apezteguia
- Production companies: Señor Z; Boca del Cielo Producciones; Disruptiva Films
- Release date: June 8, 2025 (FICG)
- Running time: 90 minutes
- Countries: Mexico; Peru
- Language: Spanish

The Innocents (Spanish: Los inocentes) is a 2025 coming-of-age drama film co-written and directed by Germán Tejada. Based on the novel of the same name by Oswaldo Reynoso, which stars Diego Cruchaga Ponce, Fabián Calle, José Miguel Chuman, Grecia Pino, and José Masías. It is a Mexican-Peruvian co-production.

The film had its world premiere at the 2025 Guadalajara International Film Festival on June 8, where it won the Best Genre Film.

== Synopsis ==
Cara de Ángel is a sensitive teenager in search of his identity, trying to understand what it means to be a man in a world shaped by hostile masculinity. To earn a place in the neighborhood pack and prove his manhood, he joins a robbery; they plan to break into the house of a man they want revenge on. Driven by sexual desire, he explores his connection with Gabriela, a girl from the neighborhood he believes he’s in love with, and Jhonny, the lead singer of a punk band he deeply admires. His impulsive, hormone-fueled choices lead him into betrayal and mark the end of his innocence.

== Cast ==
- Diego Cruchaga Ponce de León
- Fabián Calle
- José Miguel Chuman
- Grecia Pino
- José Masías
- Beto Benites
- Joshua Salinas
- Josué Subauste
- Christian Calderón
- Lucía Becerra
- Andrea Berrocal

== Production ==
Principal photography began on March 29, 2022, in Lima, Peru.

== Release ==
The Innocents had its world premiere on June 8, 2025 as part of the official selection at the 40th Guadalajara International Film Festival, where it competed for the Maguey Award.

== Accolades ==
Award	Date	Category	Recipient	Result	Ref.
Guadalajara International Film Festival	15 June 2025	Maguey Award	The Innocents	Nominated	
Guadalajara International Film Festival	15 June 2025	Best Genre Film	The Innocents	Won	
Lima Film Festival	16 September 2025	Peruvian Competition - Best Film	The Innocents	Won	
Lima Film Festival	16 September 2025	Peruvian Competition - Best Director	Germán Tejeda	Won	
