= Beloved Tropic =

- Colombian theatrical release poster
- Spanish: Querido trópico
- Directed by: Ana Endara
- Written by: Ana Endara; Pilar Moreno
- Produced by: Isabella Gálvez
- Starring: Paulina García; Jenny Navarrete
- Cinematography: Nicolás Wong Díaz
- Edited by: Bertrand Conard
- Music by: Carlos García
- Production companies: Mente Pública; Big Sur Películas; Mansa Productora
- Release dates: September 7, 2024 (TIFF); August 7, 2025 (Colombia); September 18, 2025 (Panama)
- Running time: 108 minutes
- Countries: Panama; Colombia
- Language: Spanish

Beloved Tropic (Spanish: Querido trópico) is a 2024 drama film co-written and directed by Ana Endara. Starring Paulina García and Jenny Navarrete, it follows the relationship between an upper-class woman with dementia and her immigrant caregiver.

The film had its world premiere at the 2024 Toronto International Film Festival on 7 September. It was theatrically released in Panama and Colombia on 7 August 2025. It was also selected as the Panamanian entry for Best International Feature Film at the 98th Academy Awards, but it was not nominated.

== Synopsis ==
Mercedes is an upper-class Panamanian woman, a business owner who has raised her four adult children alone. After surgery, Mercedes is facing the onset of dementia. Ana María, a Colombian immigrant who works as a caregiver and is hiding a secret, will be tasked with caring for Mercedes. As time passes, a bond develops between the two women that will help each other in their lives.

== Cast ==
- Paulina García as Mercedes
- Jenny Navarrette as Ana María
- Juliette Roy as Jimena
- Syddia Ospina as Cristina

== Production ==
Principal photography began in mid-July 2023.

== Release ==
Beloved Tropic had its world premiere on September 7, 2024, at the 49th Toronto International Film Festival, then screened on September 20, 2024, at the 72nd San Sebastian International Film Festival, on October 4, 2024, at the 26th Rio de Janeiro International Film Festival, and on October 19, 2024, at the 19th Rome Film Festival, on January 28, 2025, at the 48th Gothenburg Film Festival, on April 2, 2025, at the 64th Cartagena Film Festival, on April 3, 2025, at the 13th Panama International Film Festival, on April 11, 2025, at the 49th Hong Kong International Film Festival, on April 19, 2025, at the 68th San Francisco International Film Festival, and on June 26, 2025, at the 13th Costa Rica International Film Festival.

The film was commercially released on August 7, 2025, in Colombian theaters, and on September 18, 2025, in Panamanian theaters.

The film will compete in the Awards Buzz – Best International Feature Film section of the 37th Palm Springs International Film Festival on 4 January 2026.

== Accolades ==
Year	Award / Festival	Category	Recipient	Result	Ref.
2024	72nd San Sebastian International Film Festival	Horizontes Latinos Award	Beloved Tropic	Nominated	
2024	33rd Biarritz Film Festival	Audience Award	Beloved Tropic	Won	
2024	33rd Biarritz Film Festival	Best Performance	Paulina García & Jenny Navarette	Won	
2024	19th Rome Film Festival	Progressive Cinema Competition - Best Film	Beloved Tropic	Nominated	
2024	30th Kolkata International Film Festival	Best Director	Ana Endara	Won	
2025	37th Toulouse Latin America Film Festival	CCAS Prize for Fiction	Beloved Tropic	Won	
2025	37th Toulouse Latin America Film Festival	Prize of the Syndicat Français de la Critique de Cinéma	Beloved Tropic	Won	
2025	37th Toulouse Latin America Film Festival	Grand Prize of the “Le Grand Prix” Coup de Cœur Festival	Beloved Tropic	Won	
2025	68th San Francisco International Film Festival	Cine Latino Award	Beloved Tropic	Won	
2025	29th Lima Film Festival	Trophy Spondylus	Beloved Tropic	Nominated	
2025	29th Lima Film Festival	Best Actress	Jenny Navarette	Won	
2025	29th Lima Film Festival	APC Signis Peru - Monseñor Luciano Metzinger Communicators Association Award	Beloved Tropic	Won	
2025	21st Santiago International Film Festival	International Competition - Best Film	Beloved Tropic	Nominated	

== See also ==
- List of submissions to the 98th Academy Awards for Best International Feature Film
- List of Panamanian submissions for the Academy Award for Best International Feature Film
