= Reverón =

Reverón may refer to:

== People ==
- Adriana Reverón (born 1985), Spanish model and beauty pageant titleholder
- Armando Reverón (1889–1954), Venezuelan painter and sculptor
- Jorge Díaz Reverón, Puerto Rican judge

== Films ==
- Reverón (1952 film), documentary film directed by Margot Benacerraf
- Reverón (2011 film), film directed by Diego Rísquez
