= Ashes, the Movie =

- Theatrical release poster
- Directed by: Antonio Rodríguez Romaní
- Written by: Antonio Rodríguez Romaní
- Produced by: Antonio Rodríguez Romaní
- Starring: Fredy Ortiz
- Cinematography: Antonio Rodríguez Romaní
- Edited by: Antonio Rodríguez Romaní
- Music by: Uchpa
- Production company: Ayni Producciones
- Release dates: August 9, 2025 (Lima); November 27, 2025 (Peru)
- Running time: 87 minutes
- Country: Peru
- Languages: Spanish; Quechua

Ashes, the Movie (Spanish: Uchpa, la película) is a 2025 Peruvian biographical documentary film written, produced, edited, filmed and directed by Antonio Rodríguez Romaní. It follows the life and work of musician Fredy Ortiz, founder of Uchpa, a Quechua-language hard rock and blues band.

== Synopsis ==
Fredy Ortiz, founder of the Quechua-language hard rock and blues band Uchpa, talks about his life before and after the band, from his student days to his role in the war against the Shining Path and the reason for forming the group.

== Narrator ==
- Fredy Ortiz

== Release ==
The film had its world premiere on August 9, 2025, at the 29th Lima Film Festival as part of the Peruvian Competition.

The film was commercially released on November 27, 2025, in Peruvian theaters.

== Accolades ==
Year	Award / Festival	Category	Recipient	Result	Ref.
2025	29th Lima Film Festival	Peruvian Competition - Best Film	Ashes, the Movie	Nominated	
