= Bros (2026 film) =

- Theatrical release poster
- Spanish: Hermanos
- Directed by: Carol Rodríguez Colás; Marina Rodríguez Colás
- Written by: Carol Rodríguez Colás; Marina Rodríguez Colás
- Produced by: Adrià Monés Murlans
- Starring: Pau Marquez; Badr Oubahassou; Omar Mills
- Cinematography: Philippe Therasse
- Edited by: Juliana Montañés
- Music by: Camila Uboldi
- Production companies: Fasten Films; The Gang La Película AIE; Cobalt Films; Saga Film; Martfilms
- Distributed by: Filmax
- Release dates: 20 April 2026 (BCN Film Fest); 3 July 2026 (Spain)
- Running time: 84 minutes
- Countries: Spain; Belgium; Mexico
- Languages: Spanish; Catalan; Arabic

Bros (Spanish: Hermanos), originally known as La gang, is a 2026 drama film written and directed by Carol Rodríguez Colás and Marina Rodríguez Colás. It stars Pau Márquez, Badr Oubahassou, and Omar Mills.

== Plot ==
Set in 2022 during the FIFA World Cup, the plot follows Ayman, a teenager of Moroccan background who is invited by Sara, a girl from a wealthy family in upper Barcelona, to her 16th birthday party. Upon Ayman arriving to the party with his pals Rober and Eric, the relationship between the three friends is tested.

== Cast ==
- Badr Oubahassou as Ayman
- Omar Mills as Eric
- Pau Márquez as Rober

== Production ==
Originally known as La gang, the film is a Fasten Films co-production with The Gang La Película AIE, Cobalt Films, Saga Film, and Martfilms. Philippe Therasse worked as director of photography. Shooting locations included Cornellà de Llobregat, L'Hospitalet de Llobregat, and Barcelona.

== Release ==
Bros was presented at the 10th BCN Film Fest on 20 April 2026. It also screened at the 41st Guadalajara International Film Festival. Distributed by Filmax, it was released theatrically in Spain on 3 July 2026.

== Reception ==
Javier Ocaña of El País pointed out that the film "is sometimes let down by its own good intentions", finding resemblances, in its overstuffing of elements of social activism, to a promotional ad from the Ministry of Equality.

Eulàlia Iglesias of Fotogramas rated the film 3 out of 5 stars, singling out the trio of leading actors as the best thing about the film.

Luis Martínez of El Mundo gave the film a 4-star rating, lauding it as "vibrant cinema, fierce cinema, gritty cinema that surprises and is surprised".

== See also ==
- List of Spanish films of 2026
