= Street Wanderers =

- Argentine theatrical release poster
- Spanish: Los caminantes de la calle
- Directed by: Juan Martín Hsu
- Written by: Juan Martín Hsu; Marcelo Pitrola
- Produced by: Bárbara Herrera; Mariana Luconi
- Starring: Victoria Almeida; Chien Min Lee
- Cinematography: Roman Kasseroller
- Edited by: Ana Remón
- Music by: Jorge Miranda; Mowat
- Production company: Protón Cine
- Distributed by: Cinetren (Argentina); V&R Films (Peru)
- Release dates: November 16, 2025 (PÖFF); July 9, 2026 (Argentina); August 27, 2026 (Peru)
- Running time: 88 minutes
- Countries: Argentina; Perú
- Languages: Spanish; Cantonese

Street Wanderers (Spanish: Los caminantes de la calle) is a 2025 crime thriller film directed by Juan Martín Hsu and written by Hsu and Marcelo Pitrola. An Argentine-Peruvian co-production, the film stars Victoria Almeida and Chien Min Lee, accompanied by Andrés Tan He, Yuchen Che, Yam Pin Kon and Emilio Chau Chiu.

== Synopsis ==
Prosecutor Diana Belenguer and officer Li investigate a war between Chinese mafias while Xu attempts to rescue a trafficking victim trapped between both factions.

== Cast ==
- Victoria Almeida as Prossecutor Belenguer
- Andrés Tan He as Xu
- Yuchen Che as 'La Pujianesa'
- Chien Min Lee as Oficcer Li
- Yam Pin Kon as Dageng
- Willy Kon Chin Yi as Dageng's son
- Alex Kawen León Yee as Kwan
- Emilio Chau Chiu

== Production ==
Principal photography took place in Lima and Mendoza.

== Release ==
Street Wanderers had its world premiere on November 16, 2025, at the 29th Tallinn Black Nights Film Festival, then screened on April 16, 2026, at the 27th Buenos Aires International Festival of Independent Cinema, in mid-April 2026, at the 41st Guadalajara International Film Festival, and on August 14, 2026, at the 30th Lima Film Festival.

It was commercially released on July 9, 2026, in Argentine theaters, and is scheduled for its commercial release on August 27, 2026, in Peruvian theaters.

== Accolades ==
| Award / Festival | Date of ceremony | Category | Recipient(s) | Result | Ref. |
|---|---|---|---|---|---|
| Tallinn Black Nights Film Festival | 23 November 2025 | Critics' Picks Competition - Best Film Award | Street Wanderers | Nominated | |
| Guadalajara International Film Festival | 25 April 2026 | Cine de Genero Award | Street Wanderers | Nominated | |
