= Sad Girlz =

- French theatrical release poster
- Spanish: Chicas tristes
- Directed by: Fernanda Tovar
- Screenplay by: Fernanda Tovar
- Produced by: Daniel Loustaunau; Araceli Velázquez
- Starring: Rocio Guzmán; Darana Álvarez
- Cinematography: Rosa Hadit Hernández
- Edited by: José Pablo Escamilla
- Music by: Wissam Hojeij
- Production companies: Colectivo Colmena; Potenza Producciones; Promenades Films; Martini Shot Films; CTT Exp & Rentals
- Distributed by: Wild Bunch Distribution (fr)
- Release dates: 14 February 2026 (Berlinale); 12 August 2026 (France)
- Countries: Mexico; Spain; France
- Language: Spanish

Sad Girlz (Spanish: Chicas tristes) is a 2026 coming-of-age drama film written and directed by Fernanda Tovar in her debut feature. It is a Mexican-Spanish-French co-production.

The film had its world premiere in the Generation 14plus section of the 76th Berlin International Film Festival on 14 February 2026, where it won the Crystal Bear.

== Plot ==
The plot follows the relationship between two 16-year-old female swimmers. One of them suffers from sexual violence at a party.

== Cast ==
- Rocio Guzmán as Maestra
- Darana Álvarez as Paula
- Tatsumi Milori as Raz
- Tomás García-Agraz as Mario
- Mónica del Carmen as Valeria
- Raúl Villegas as Esteban
- Lucio Lemus as Daniel
- Luisa Almaguer as Karaoke
- Andrea Camacho as Carmen
- Áyax as Laura
- Óscar Lever as Chanclas
- Mario Flores as Raúl
- Héctor Kuri as Pedro
- Daniel Aranzubia as Carlos

== Production ==
The film is a Colectivo Colmena co-production with Potenza Producciones, Promenades Films, Martini Shot Films, and CTT Exp & Rentals.

== Release ==
Sad Girlz premiered in the Generation 14plus section of the 76th Berlin International Film Festival in February 2026. It was also programmed at the 2026 Tribeca Festival, in the Latin American competition of the 30th Lima Film Festival, in the 'Horizontes Latinos' slate of the 74th San Sebastián International Film Festival, at the 62nd Chicago International Film Festival. and in the official competition of the 23rd Marrakech International Film Festival.

For its Mexican premiere, it was presented at the 24th Morelia International Film Festival (FICM) on 17 October 2026. Cine Caníbal secured Mexican theatrical distribution.

Distributed by Wild Bunch Distribution, it was released theatrically in France on 12 August 2026.

== Critical reception ==
Cédric Succivalli of International Cinephile Society rated the film 4 out of 5 stars, declaring it an "extraordinary" directorial debut feature, standing "as a quiet but devastating exploration of a friendship under pressure".

Marta Balaga of Cineuropa deemed the film to be a "bittersweet stunner", in which the director "bets everything on female friendship, and wins".

Nikki Baughan of ScreenDaily considered the film "sensitive and knowing study of female teenage friendship, powered by strong performances from its young leads".

On the review aggregator website Rotten Tomatoes, 100% of 10 critics' reviews are positive, with an average rating of 8.5/10.

== Accolades ==
Year	Award	Category	Nominee(s)	Result	Ref.
2026	76th Berlin International Film Festival	Crystal Bear for the Best Film in Generation 14plus		Won	
2026	76th Berlin International Film Festival	Grand Prix of the International Jury for the Best Film in Generation 14Plus		Won	
2026	30th Lima Film Festival	Jury Prize for Best Screenplay	Fernanda Tovar	Won	
2026	30th Lima Film Festival	Jury Prize for Best Actress	Rocío Guzmán and Darana Álvarez	Won	
2026	24th Morelia International Film Festival	Casa Wabi-Escine Award to the Director of a Debut Film	Fernanda Tovar	Won	

== See also ==
- List of French films of 2026
