= Heart of the Wolf =

- Theatrical release poster
- Spanish: El corazón del lobo
- Directed by: Francisco J. Lombardi
- Screenplay by: Francisco J. Lombardi; Augusto Cabada
- Based on: El miedo del lobo by Carlos Enrique Freyre
- Produced by: Gustavo Sánchez
- Starring: Víctor Acurio; Jared Vicente Sánchez
- Cinematography: Teo Delgado
- Edited by: Eric Williams
- Music by: Karin Zielinski
- Production company: La Soga Producciones
- Distributed by: Bf Distribution
- Release dates: August 9, 2025 (Lima); October 2, 2025 (Peru)
- Running time: 99 minutes
- Country: Peru
- Languages: Spanish; Asháninka

Heart of the Wolf (Spanish: El corazón del lobo) is a 2025 Peruvian war drama film directed by Francisco J. Lombardi from a screenplay he co-wrote with Augusto Cabada. Based on the novel El miedo del lobo by Carlos Enrique Freyre, which is itself based on a true story. It stars Víctor Acurio and Jared Vicente Sánchez, accompanied by Silvana Goycochea, Paul Ramírez, and Martín Martínez.

== Synopsis ==
Aquiles, an Asháninka boy kidnapped by the Shining Path, undergoes a transformation from victim to combatant before attempting to escape the terrorist organization.

== Cast ==
- Víctor Acurio as Aquiles
  - Jared Vicente Sánchez as Aquiles (Kid)
- Silvana Goycochea as Camarada Lucía
- Paul Ramírez as Rogelio
- Martín Martínez as Roque
- José Fernández as Juan Garcia
- Alberick García as Álvarez
- Martín Velásquez Marvelat as Camarada José
- Aníbal Lozano Herrera as Camarada William

== Production ==
Francisco J. Lombardi, who had already addressed the subject of Shining Path terrorism from the military's perspective in The Mouth of the Wolf, felt compelled to create another feature exploring the organization's internal dynamics. While developing the screenplay, Lombardi incorporated elements he had already been working on regarding the topic, he and Cabada also had to interview former members of the group, including one who had been a leader within the organization.

In September 2023, the project under the working title El corazón del monstruo (The Heart of the Monster) was awarded a grant of S/.800,000 by the Dirección del Audiovisual, la Fonografía y los Nuevos Medios (DAFO) of the Ministry of Culture.

Principal photography took place between October and November 2024, at locations in Tarapoto and Pariamarca, Canta. Real army weaponry was used for the filming.

== Release ==
The film premiered worldwide on August 9, 2025, at the 29th Lima Film Festival, then screened in early November 2025 at the 40th Mar del Plata International Film Festival, and on March 12, 2026, at the 29th Málaga Film Festival.

It was commercially released on October 2, 2025, in Peruvian theaters.

== Box office ==
In its opening weekend, the film drew 23,000 viewers. Entering its fourth week of release, the movie had reached an audience of 77,000, and concluded its run with 85,000 viewers.

== Accolades ==
Award / Festival	Date of ceremony	Category	Recipient(s)	Result	Ref.
Mar del Plata International Film Festival	16 November 2025	Best Latin American Film	Heart of the Wolf	Nominated	
Málaga Film Festival	15 March 2026	Best Latin American Film	Heart of the Wolf	Nominated	
