= I Am Mario =

2026 Mexican drama film

- Soy Mario
- Directed by: Sharon Kleinberg
- Written by: Sharon Kleinberg
- Produced by: Sharon Kleinberg; Jaime Tiktin; Lourdes Elizarrarás
- Starring: Oustin de León; Héctor Kotsifakis; Mayra Batalla; Ruth Ramos
- Cinematography: Gerard Uzcátegui
- Edited by: Aldo Álvarez Morales
- Music by: Axel Ricco; Sebastián Bell
- Production company: Producciones Siete Elefantes
- Distributed by: Mandarina Cine
- Release date: 2026
- Running time: 97 minutes
- Country: Mexico
- Language: Spanish

I Am Mario is a 2026 Mexican drama film written and directed by Sharon Kleinberg in her feature directorial debut. It stars Oustin de León, Héctor Kotsifakis, Mayra Batalla, and Ruth Ramos.

The film premiered at the 41st Guadalajara International Film Festival before being selected for the Discovery programme of the 2026 Toronto International Film Festival.

== Premise ==
Mario, a 40-year-old transgender taxi driver, becomes pregnant. As he confronts the possibility of becoming a father, he must reconcile his expectations of masculinity with the prejudices of the society around him.

== Cast ==
- Oustin de León as Mario
- Héctor Kotsifakis
- Mayra Batalla
- Ruth Ramos
- Krystian Ferrer
- Mercedes Hernández
- Fermín Martínez
- Fernanda Rivera
- Norma Pablo

== Production ==
I Am Mario was written and directed by Sharon Kleinberg. The film was produced by Sharon Kleinberg, Jaime Tiktin and Lourdes Elizarrarás for Producciones Siete Elefantes, with support from EFICINE. It received the SUROESTE and Dolby Latinoamérica post-production awards at Viña Construye during the 2025 Festival Internacional de Cine de Viña del Mar (FICVIÑA).

Principal photography took place in Mexico City.

== Release ==
The film had its world premiere at the 41st Guadalajara International Film Festival, where it received the Maguey Jury Award and the Mezcal Award for Best Performance for Oustin de León.

It was subsequently selected for the Discovery programme of the 2026 Toronto International Film Festival.
