= List of French films of 2026 =

This is a list of French films that are scheduled to release in 2026, including co-productions with other countries.

== Scheduled ==
- ⌀ Denotes a film that was publicly screened prior to 2026, be it through film festivals, premieres or releases in other countries
- ‡ Denotes a film primarily not in the French language

Scheduled films
Opening	English Title	Native Title	Director	Cast	Studio	Ref.
28 January	Guru ⌀	Gourou	Yann Gozlan	Pierre Niney, Marion Barbeau, Anthony Bajon	Studiocanal	
25 February	Calle Málaga ⌀‡	Rue Málaga	Maryam Touzani	Carmen Maura, Marta Etura, Ahmed Boulane	Ad Vitam	
15 April	Juste une illusion	Juste une illusion	Olivier Nakache, Eric Toledano	Louis Garrel, Camille Cottin, Simon Boublil, Pierre Lottin, Alexis Rosenstiehl	Gaumont Distribution	
6 May	Mi Amor	Mi Amor	Guillaume Nicloux	Pom Klementieff, Benoît Magimel, Freya Mavor	Le Pacte	
12 May	The Electric Kiss	La Vénus électrique	Pierre Salvadori	Pio Marmai, Vimala Pons, Gilles Lellouche, Anais Demoustier	Diaphana Distribution	
14 May	Parallel Tales	Histoires parallèles	Asghar Farhadi	Isabelle Huppert, Virginie Efira, Vincent Cassel, Pierre Niney, Adam Bessa	Memento	
16 May	The Beloved ‡	L'Être Aimé	Rodrigo Sorogoyen	Javier Bardem, Victoria Luengo, Raúl Arévalo	Le Pacte	
17 June	Jim Queen ‡	Jim Queen à la recherche de la Chloroqueer	Nicolas Athane, Marco Nguyen		Bobbypills	
12 August	Sad Girlz	Chicas tristes	Fernanda Tovar	Darana Álvarez, Rocío Guzmán	Wild Bunch Distribution	
19 August	Fjord	Fjord	Cristian Mungiu	Sebastian Stan, Renate Reinsve	Le Pacte	
26 August	The Unknown	L'Inconnue	Arthur Harari	Léa Seydoux, Niels Schneider, Victoire Du Bois	Pathé	
9 September	A Woman's Life	La Vie d'une femme	Charline Bourgeois-Tacquet	Léa Drucker, Mélanie Thierry, Charles Berling	Pyramide Distribution	
9 September	Pressure	Pressure	Anthony Maras	Andrew Scott, Brendan Fraser, Kerry Condon	StudioCanal	
23 September	Another Day	Garance	Jeanne Herry	Adèle Exarchopoulos, Sara Giraudeau	StudioCanal	
30 September	A Man of His Time	Notre salut	Emmanuel Marre	Swann Arlaud, Sandrine Blancke, Mathieu Perotto	Condor Distribution	
7 October	All About Corinne	Ni vue, ni connue	Marc Fitoussi	Isabelle Huppert, Sandrine Kiberlain, Anne Marivin	Memento	
14 October	Minotaur	Minotaur	Andrey Zvyagintsev	Iris Lebedeva, Dmitriy Mazurov	Les Films du Losange	
14 October	Les Misérables	Les Misérables	Fred Cavayé	Vincent Lindon, Tahar Rahim	Curiosa Films	
21 October	La Gradiva	La Gradiva	Marine Atlan	Antonia Buresi, Colas Quignard, Suzanne Gerin	Tandem	
21 October	Karma	Karma	Guillaume Canet	Marion Cotillard, Denis Ménochet, Leonardo Sbaraglia, Luis Zahera	Pathé	
11 November	The Green Eyes	Les Yeux Verts	Fanny Liatard, and Jérémy Trouilh	Sayyid El Alami, Anamaria Vartolomei	June Films	
11 November	Il faut brûler maman	Il faut brûler maman	Albert Dupontel	Louise Coldefy, Julia Piaton, Artus	Pathé	
16 December	La bola negra ‡		Javier Calvo, Javier Ambrossi		Le Pacte	

== TBA ==
† Denotes a film released through a streaming service, not theatrically
‡ Denotes a film primarily not in the French language

TBA
English Title	Native Title	Director	Cast	Studio	Ref.
Roma Elastica	Roma elastica	Bertrand Mandico	Marion Cotillard, Noémie Merlant, Isabella Ferrari, Franco Nero, Ornella Muti	Condor Distribution	
Milo	Milo	Nicole Garcia	Marion Cotillard, Théodore Pellerin, Artus, Laure Calamy	StudioCanal	

== See also ==
- List of French films of 2025
