= No Dogs Allowed (film) =

2024 German drama film

- Theatrical film poster
- German: No Dogs Allowed
- Directed by: Steve Bache
- Written by: Stephan Kämpf
- Produced by: Marcos Kantis; Martin Lehwald; Felix Ruple; Stella Wejchert
- Starring: Carlo Krammling; Robin Sondermann; Katharina Marie Schubert
- Cinematography: Manuel Meinhardt
- Edited by: Maximilian Merth
- Music by: Andreas Pfeiffer
- Release dates: 17 November 2024 (Tallinn); 18 November 2024 (Germany)
- Running time: 106 mins.
- Country: Germany
- Language: German

No Dogs Allowed (German: No Dogs Allowed) is a 2024 German coming-of-age drama film, directed by Steve Bache and written by Stephan Kämpf. The film stars Carlo Krammling, Robin Sondermann, and Katharina Marie Schubert. It premiered at the Tallinn Black Nights Film Festival in 2024, before its limited theatrical release throughout Germany the following day.

== Synopsis ==
15-year-old Gabo struggles to control and hide his pedophilic urges, confiding only in online forums where he encounters the manipulative older Dave. When Dave is arrested for suspected abuse of minors, Gabo must make a choice.

== Cast ==
- Carlo Krammling as Gabo
- Robin Sondermann as Dave
- Katharina Marie Schubert as Susanne
- Bineta Hansen as Emi
- Sean Douglas (Schauspieler) as Sebbo
- Sammy Schrein as Sam
- Vera Fay as Maja
- Lisa Riesner as Frau Makowski
- Sithembile Menck as Frau Juhasz

== Reception ==
J. Zimmerman of Video Librarian lauded the film's controversial themes: "No Dogs Allowed is an uncomfortable but thrilling glimpse into the minds of pedophiles." Frank J. Avella of The Contending praised the filmmakers and lead actor: "Stephan Kämpf's dialogue always sounds authentic and is, often, disquietingly graphic. And Steve Bache has cast the movie incredibly well eliciting affecting performances (like Carlo Krammling in an astonishing film debut). He also knows exactly where to end the film."

In a mixed review, Earl Peterson of Journey Into Cinema had kind words for the lead actor and director, but lamented about the liberties the film took considering the subject matter: "It's unfortunate that these minor missteps threaten to derail an otherwise well-crafted and bold film, held together by Krammling's poignant performance. Despite these flaws, Bache and his cast still achieve something remarkable by telling a story that feels impossible to tell."

== Awards and nominations ==
Award / Film Festival	Category	Result	ref
41st Guadalajara International Film Festival	Maguey Award	Nominated	
2025 Riviera International Film Festival	Jury prize for best film	Nominated	
2024 Filmschau Baden Württemberg	Best film	Won	
