= Designation of Origin (film) =

- Theatrical release poster
- Directed by: Tomás Alzamora
- Written by: Tomás Alzamora; Javier Salinas
- Produced by: Tomás Alzamora; Pablo Calisto
- Cinematography: Sergio Armstrong
- Edited by: Nicolás Venegas; Tomás Alzamora; Valeria Hernández
- Music by: Martín Schlotfeldt
- Production company: Equeco
- Distributed by: Storyboard Media Distribución
- Release dates: October 17, 2024 (FICV); April 24, 2025 (Chile)
- Running time: 86 minutes
- Country: Chile
- Language: Spanish

Designation of Origin (Spanish: Denominación de origen) is a 2024 Chilean mockumentary comedy film co-written, co-produced, co-edited and directed by Tomás Alzamora. It follows a social movement in San Carlos to obtain the designation of origin for the best longaniza in Chile.

== Synopsis ==
After unfairly losing the title of Chile's best longaniza, a social movement emerged in the small town of San Carlos, seeking to obtain the "designation of origin" and restore the dignity of an entire community.

== Cast ==
- Luisa Maravolí as Luisa Barrientos
- Roberto Betancourt as DJ Fuego
- Exequías Inostroza as uncle Lalo
- Alexis Marín as lawyer Peñailillo

== Production ==
Principal photography began in early November 2022 in San Carlos and Ñuble.

== Release ==
Designation of Origin had its world premiere on October 17, 2024, at the 31st Valdivia International Film Festival, then screened on December 2, 2024, at the 15th Iquique International Film Festival, on January 9, 2025, at the 6th Ñuble National Film Festival, at the end of January 2025 at the 17th Chilean Film Festival, on March 22, 2025, at the 32nd San Diego Latino Film Festival, and on April 3, 2025, at the 26th Buenos Aires International Festival of Independent Cinema.

It was commercially released on April 24, 2025, in Chilean theaters.

== Accolades ==
Year	Award / Festival	Category	Recipient	Result	Ref.
2024	31st Valdivia International Film Festival	Best Film	Designation of Origin	Nominated	
2024	31st Valdivia International Film Festival	Special Jury Prize	Designation of Origin	Won	
2024	31st Valdivia International Film Festival	Audience Award	Designation of Origin	Won	
2025	17th Chilean Film Festival	Best Film	Designation of Origin	Won	
2025	17th Chilean Film Festival	Best Performance	Luisa Barrientos	Won	
2025	26th Buenos Aires International Festival of Independent Cinema	International Competition - Best Film	Designation of Origin	Nominated	
2025	26th Buenos Aires International Festival of Independent Cinema	Best Director	Tomás Alzamora	Won	
2025	29th Lima Film Festival	Trophy Spondylus	Designation of Origin	Nominated	
2025	29th Lima Film Festival	Best Screenplay	Tomás Alzamora & Javier Salinas	Won	
