= El malquerido =

2015 Venezuelan film

- Film poster
- Directed by: Diego Rísquez
- Written by: Robert A. Gómez; Emiliano Farías; Diego Rísquez
- Produced by: Producciones Guakamaya; Centro Nacional Autónomo de Cinematografía; Xenon Films
- Starring: Jesús “Chino” Miranda; Greisy Mena; Sheila Monterola; Héctor Manrique; Mariaca Semprún; Carlos Cruz; Sócrates Serrano
- Cinematography: Cezary Jaworski
- Distributed by: Cines Unidos
- Release date: 18 December 2015
- Running time: 93 minutes
- Country: Venezuela
- Language: Spanish

El malquerido is a 2015 biographical film directed by Venezuelan filmmaker Diego Rísquez, starring Jesús Miranda (Chyno Miranda) and Greisy Mena. The film is based on the life of the Venezuelan bolero singer Felipe Pirela.

== Plot ==
The film portrays the life of Venezuelan singer Felipe Pirela, "El bolerista de América", from the moment inspiration and the path of music opened in a radio station in Maracaibo, to the conquest of international markets and places.

== Cast ==
- Jesús Chyno Miranda as Felipe Pirela
- Greisy Mena as Mariela Montiel
- Sheila Monterola as Mamá Lucía
- Héctor Manrique as Billo Frómeta
- Mariaca Semprún as Aminta
- Carlos Cruz as Portabales
- Sócrates Serrano as Daniel Sánchez
- Samantha Castillo as La Lupe
- Dylan Pérez Reyes as Felipe Pirela joven
- Natalia Roman as Paquita
- Diego Rísquez as Dante
- Iván Tamayo as José Paiva
- Vicente Peña as Cheo Garcia
- Samantha Castillo as La lupe

== Production ==
Filming began in Caracas at the beginning of March 2015, lasting a month In April 2015, the crew filmed key scenes in Maracaibo, from locations such as the Baralt Plaza, the Chiquinquirá Basilica, the Fonoplatea de los Éxitos, and other locations. The production was made between Producciones Guakamaya, the Centro Nacional de Cinematografía (CNAC), Pedro Mezquita, Xenon Films, Ron Santa Teresa and the Zulia state government, with the support of the audiovisual department-cinema club of the University of Zulia culture department.

Despite being biographical, the director warned that the film had elements of fiction, since he did not intend to "make a documentary", and that "The cinema I make is not an obvious cinema, it is a suggestive cinema. There is a main story, but there are always subplots where I let the viewer draw their own conclusions".

The singer "Chino" Miranda, besides acting in the film, also interprets the 16 songs in the movie. The film was premiered at the Sala de Artes Escénicas del Centro de Arte de Maracaibo Lía Bermúdez (CAMLB).

== Reception ==
The film was watched by 22,000 people three days after its premiere. according to the Venezuelan Association of the Film Industry (Asoinci), the film was the highest grossing national production in 2015 and was watched by more than 210,829 people from its premiere until 11 January 2016.

It was awarded Best Film at the Mérida Film Festival in 2016.

Some Venezuelan critics and journalists criticized biographical inaccuracies and part of the cast.
