= The Red Hangar =

- Theatrical release poster
- Spanish: Hangar rojo
- Directed by: Juan Pablo Sallato
- Screenplay by: Luis Emilio Guzmán
- Produced by: Juan Ignacio Sabatini; Juan Pablo Sallato
- Starring: Nicolás Zarate; Boris Quercia; Marcial Tagle; Catalina Stuardo; Arón Hernández; Juan Cano
- Cinematography: Diego Pequeño
- Edited by: Valeria Hernández; Sebastian Brahm
- Music by: Alberto Micheli; Matteo Marrella
- Production companies: Villano; Brava Cine; Rain Dogs; Caravan; Berta Film; TVN
- Distributed by: Storyboard Media
- Release dates: February 2026 (Berlinale); 1 October 2026 (Chile)
- Countries: Chile; Argentina; Italy
- Language: Spanish

The Red Hangar (Spanish: Hangar rojo) is a 2026 political thriller film directed by Juan Pablo Sallato and written by Luis Emilio Guzmán starring Nicolás Zarate, Boris Quercia, Marcial Tagle, Catalina Stuardo, and Arón Hernández. Shot in black and white, it is a Chilean-Argentine-Italian co-production.

== Plot ==
Set in Santiago de Chile against the backdrop of the 11 September 1973 Chilean coup d'etat, the plot follows a Chilean Air Force officer pressed to follow orders he does not believe in.

== Cast ==
- Nicolás Zárate as Captain Jorge Silva
- Boris Quercia as Colonel Soler
- Marcial Tagle as Colonel Jahn
- Aron Hernández as Sergeant Hernández
- Catalina Stuardo as Rosa
- Francisco Carrasco as Lieutenant Carrasco
- Juan Cano as Sargent Mujica

== Production ==
The film is a co-production by Villano, Brava Cine, Rain Dogs, Caravan, Berta Film, and TVN. It was entirely shot in the Mendoza Province.

== Release ==
Cast and crew members attending the 2026 Málaga Film Festival

The Red Hangar premiered in the 'Perspectives' section of the 76th Berlin International Film Festival (Berlinale) in February 2026. The film also competed at the 29th Málaga Film Festival and the 41st Guadalajara International Film Festival. It was released theatrically in Spain on 8 May 2026 by Festival Films. It is scheduled to be released theatrically in Chile on 1 October 2026.

== Reception ==
Jonathan Romney of ScreenDaily commended the film as "at once impressionistic and very precise".

David Katz of Cineuropa pointed out that "whilst highly watchable" "it still has a certain televisual efficiency and feels like a suspense 'finger exercise' for the creatives behind it".

Matthew Joseph Jenner of International Cinephile Society rated the film 3 out of 5 stars, billing it as "a fascinating and disconcerting morality tale about a man who believes that violence is necessary".

Elsa Fernández-Santos of El País declared it a "notable" debut feature.

The Academia de Cine de Chile submitted the film for the Goya Award for Best Ibero-American Film at the 41st Goya Awards.

== Accolades ==
Year	Award	Category	Nominee(s)	Result	Ref.
2026	29th Málaga Film Festival	Silver Biznaga for Best Actor	Nicolás Zárate	Won	
2026	29th Málaga Film Festival	Silver Biznaga for Best Editing	Valeria Hernández, Sebastián Brahm	Won	
2026	29th Málaga Film Festival	Critics' Jury Special Prize		Won	
2026	29th Málaga Film Festival	'El País' Audience Award		Won	
2026	41st Guadalajara International Film Festival	Best Ibero-American Fiction Feature Film		Won	
2026	41st Guadalajara International Film Festival	Best Director	Juan Pablo Sallato	Won	
2026	41st Guadalajara International Film Festival	Best Performance	Nicolás Zárate	Won	
2026	41st Guadalajara International Film Festival	Best Screenplay	Luis Emilio Guzmán	Won	
2026	41st Guadalajara International Film Festival	Best Technical-Artistic Achievement		Won	
2026	30th Lima Film Festival	Best Director	Juan Pablo Sallato	Won	
2026	30th Lima Film Festival	Best Cinematography	Diego Pequeño	Won	
2026	30th Lima Film Festival	Best Actor	Nicolás Zárate	Won	
2026	30th Lima Film Festival	APRECI Award for Best Film in the Latin American Fiction Competition		Won	
2026	32nd Forqué Awards	Best Latin American Film		Pending	
