= Postcards from Leningrad =

- Film poster
- Directed by: Mariana Rondon
- Written by: Mariana Rondon
- Starring: Laureano Olivares; Greisy Mena
- Distributed by: Sudaka Films
- Release date: 7 September 2007
- Country: Venezuela
- Language: Spanish

Postcards from Leningrad (Spanish: Postales de Leningrado) is a 2007 Venezuelan drama film written and directed by Mariana Rondón. It is a drama about children growing up among guerrilla groups in the 1960s in Venezuela. It was Venezuela's official entry for the Best Foreign Language Film of the 80th Academy Awards.

== Plot ==
During the leftist uprising in the 1960s in Venezuela, a young guerrilla-girl, living in secrecy, gives birth to her first daughter during Mother's Day. Due to that, her photos appear on the newspaper, since that moment they would have to run away.

Hidden places, false disguises and names are the daily life of The Girl, the narrator of the story. Alongside her cousin (Teo), they re-live the adventures of their guerrilla parents, building up a labyrinth with superheroes and strategies, in which nobody knows where the reality (or madness) begins. However, this children's game does not hide the deaths, tortures, denunciations and treason within the guerrillas.

The kids want to convert themselves into The Invisible Man, in order to escape from the danger. However, they know that their parents might never comeback and therefore, they'll only receive Postcards from Leningrad.

== Cast ==
- Laureano Olivares as Teo
- Greisy Mena as Marcela/Clara/Mercedes
- William Cifuentes as Teo (Child)
- Haydee Faverola as Grandmother
- María Fernanda Ferro as Marta
- Ignacio Marquez as Tio Miguel
- Oswaldo Hidalgo as Grandfather
- Claudia Usubillaga as The Girl

== Awards and honors ==
- Best Director (Rajatha Chakoram) at International Film Festival of Kerala(IFFK), 2008
- Golden Sun Award at Biarritz International Festival of Latin American Cinema, 2007
- Golden India Catalina Award for best film at Cartagena Film Festival, 2008
- Feature Film Trophy for best film at Cine Ceara National Cinema Festival, 2008
- International Jury Award (Revelation Category) at São Paulo International Film Festival, 2007
