= Bad Hair (2013 film) =

2013 film

- Film poster
- Directed by: Mariana Rondón
- Written by: Mariana Rondón
- Starring: Beto Benites
- Cinematography: Micaela Cajahuaringa
- Release dates: 7 September 2013 (TIFF); 25 April 2014 (Venezuela)
- Running time: 93 minutes
- Countries: Venezuela; Germany; Peru; Argentina
- Language: Spanish

Bad Hair (Spanish: Pelo malo) is a 2013 internationally co-produced drama film written and directed by Mariana Rondón, starring Samantha Castillo and child actor Samuel Lange. It was screened in the Contemporary World Cinema section at the 2013 Toronto International Film Festival.

The film, translated by Andrey Efremov, was shown in Moscow, Russia, as part of the 36th Moscow International Film Festival in June 2014.

The film has been praised by critics for its performances by Castillo and Lange. It deals with many topics ranging from adolescence and parent-child tensions to gender identity and sexuality. Its setting in Venezuelan society also contributes to many of the film's themes.

== Plot ==
Set in 2011, during the end of the Chávez presidency, Junior is a pardo nine-year-old who lives in a Shoddy Apartment in Caracas. His mother, a widow who recently lost her job as a security guard, struggles financially to support Junior and his baby brother. He has "pelo malo," a Spanish term for kinky hair, which he attempts to straighten to emulate a pop star for his upcoming school photos. He uses various methods, including smearing mayonnaise into it. His hair is a source of frustration for both him and his mother, the latter because she does not approve of his obsession with his looks, believing that it is not normal behavior for a boy of his age.

Junior and his neighbourhood friend, "La Niña," spend a lot of time in her apartment watching Venezuelan beauty pageants on TV. La Niña is a classic "girly girl," dressing like a princess and playing with makeup and dolls. Junior also enjoys the pageants, and when the time comes for them to take their school pictures, La Niña chooses to dress as a princess while Junior wants to dress as a singer with straight hair. However, the photographer tells him that it would be better if he wore a red beret and was in front of a military backdrop.

His mother does not approve of his constant grooming and takes it to be a sign of his homosexuality. Twice she takes him to the doctor to find out if he is developing "normally," later being direct and asking the doctor if he is gay. When the doctor suggests he needs a stronger male influence at home, she brings home her boss and has sex with him, forcing Junior to watch them through his open bedroom door. Junior rolls over in his bed in an attempt to look away.

Eventually his mother gives him an ultimatum- either shave his hair or move in with his grandmother, an older black woman who allows him to straighten his hair while he is in her care. Junior agrees to shave his hair, and the movie ends.

== Controversy ==
Set in Caracas, Pelo Malo tells the story of a queer, Brown adolescent and his relationship with his aggressive mother. This was the source of controversy during heightened political tensions in Venezuela. Some said that it was a critique of Hugo Chávez. Others read the film as an example of poverty porn. Rondón herself explained that it was a plea for tolerance.

== Cast ==
- Beto Benites as El Jefe
- Samantha Castillo as Marta
- Samuel Lange Zambrano as Junior
- Nelly Ramos as Carmen
- María Emilia Sulbarán as La Niña
