= Reverón (2011 film) =

- Film poster
- Directed by: Diego Rísquez
- Written by: Armando Coll; Diego Rísquez; Luigi Sciamanna
- Cinematography: Cezary Jaworski
- Music by: Alejandro Blanco Uribe
- Production company: Producciones Guakamaya
- Distributed by: Centro Nacional Autónomo de Cinematografía
- Release date: 2011
- Running time: 110 minutes
- Country: Venezuela
- Language: Spanish

Reverón is a Venezuelan biographical film released in 2011 and directed by Diego Rísquez based on the life of Venezuelan painter Armando Reverón. Reverón was the feature film that received the most awards at the 7th Venezuelan Film Festival.

== Plot ==
The film chronicles the life of Venezuelan painter Armando Reverón from 1924 until his death in 1954, mainly during his stay at El Castillete in Macuto where he had his workshop, his relationship with his muse and companion Juanita, his work, the visitors he received, and the deterioration of his mental health.

== Cast ==
- Luigi Scimana as Armando Revieron
- Sheila Manterola as Juanita
- Luis Fernandez as Nicolas Ferdennidov
- Adrian Delgado as Vicente Gerbasi
- Antonio Delli as Richard Boulton
- Prakiti Maduro as Boulton Wife
- Hector Manrique as Journalist
- Francis rueda as Reveron Mother
- Rolando Peña as doctor

== Reception ==
Reverón was the most awarded film at the 7th Venezuelan Film Festival in 2011, receiving seven awards: Best Director, Best Actor (Luigi Sciamanna), Best Supporting Actress (Sheila Monterola), Best Cinematography, Best Art Direction, Best Music, and the Audience Award.
