= Diego Rísquez =

Venezuelan film director

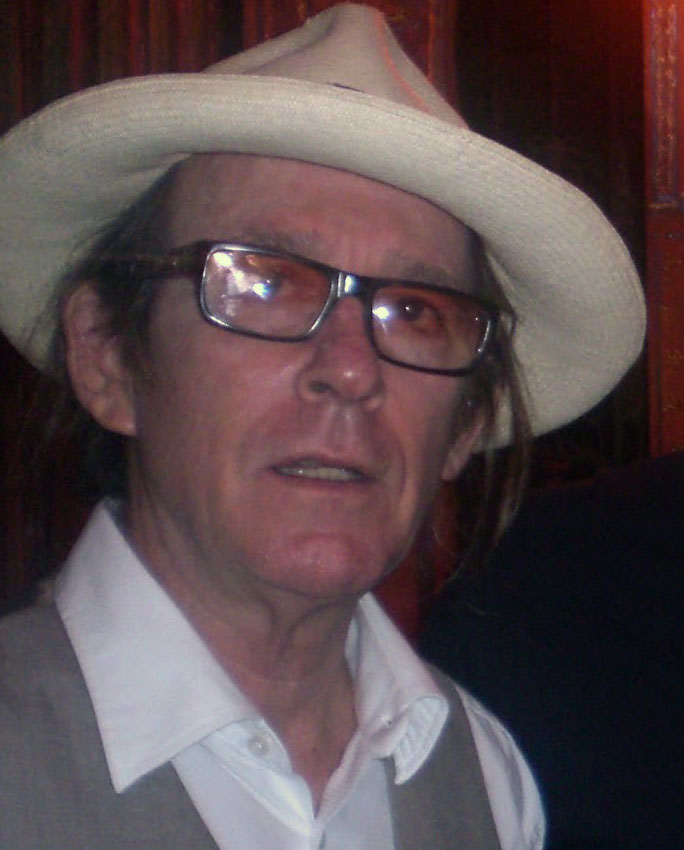
- Movement: Super-8 Vanguard

Diego Rísquez Cupello (15 December 1949 -13 January 2018) was a Venezuelan film director. His 2011 film Reverón was the feature film that received the most awards at the 7th Venezuelan Film Festival.

== Filmography ==
- El entierro de los valores (1970),
- El misterioso secuestro de las gafas negras (1973)
- A propósito de Simón Bolívar (1976),
- Poema para ser leído bajo el agua (1977),
- A propósito de la luz tropical (1978),
- Bolívar, sinfonía tropikal (1979),
- A propósito del hombre del maíz (1979),
- Orinoko, nuevo mundo (1984),
- Amérika, terra incógnita (1988),
- Karibe con tempo (1994),
- Manuela Sáenz (2000),
- Francisco de Miranda (2006),
- Reverón (2011).
- El malquerido (2015).
