= Dawn Valadez =

American documentary filmmaker

Dawn D Valadez
- Born: March 18, 1965 (age 61); Maywood, California
- Education: University of California, Santa Cruz and University of California, Berkeley
- Occupations: Film maker, social worker, resource wrangler

Dawn Valadez (born March 18, 1965) is a Mexican-American documentary filmmaker and fundraiser based in the San Francisco Bay Area in California. She directed and produced the documentary film, Going On 13 (2008) and co-directed The Pushouts.

== Education ==
Valadez attended University of California, Santa Cruz (UCSC) where she received a women's studies and psychology degree (1988). She also attended University of California, Berkeley where she received a master's degree in social welfare (1992).

== Career ==
Valadez's focus is social work, capacity building for non-profit organizations, and advocating for underrepresented groups such as people of color, low-income people, women, LGBT communities, and youth. She co-founded the Bay Area Youth Agency Consortium (BAYAC) one of the original independent AmeriCorps programs in the SF Bay Area. She previously worked at Girls Inc., Davis Street Family Resource Center, REACH Ashland Youth Center. She was a board member of the San Leandro Political Action Committee for Excellence, and the San Leandro Education Foundation. She is a former board member of BAVC Media (Bay Area Video Coalition). Dawn is the Director of Youth and Artistic Development at BAVC Media.

== Filmography ==
- GOING ON 13 - Valadez directed and produced her first feature-length film Going on 13 (2008) with Kristy Guevara-Flanagan. It was funded by CalHumanities, Public Broadcasting, and ITVS. The film premiered on September 1, 2009. It was the winner of Best Documentary at LA Femme Film Festival 2008, Best Documentary at Broad Humor Film Festival 2009, and the Cine Golden Eagle Award 2008. The documentary explores the lives of four young girls of color in the Bay Area, Ariana, Isha, Rosie, and Esme and follows their stories from the ages of 9 to 13. The film captures the girls' transition from being a child to becoming a young woman, their struggles with family matters, self identity, and everyday life.
- THE PUSHOUTS - Valadez co-directed and produced The Pushouts (2018), a documentary about Victor Rios, who at one point was a teenager involved in gangs, but is now a well-appreciated university professor. The film explores breaking the school-to-prison pipeline.
