= Six Months in a Pink and Blue Building =

2026 film by Bruno Santamaría Razo

- Spanish: Seis meses en el edificio rosa con azul
- Directed by: Bruno Santamaría Razo
- Written by: Bruno Santamaría Razo
- Produced by: Bruna Haddad; Carlos Quinonez; Bruno Santamaría Razo
- Starring: Jade Reyes; Sofía Espinosa; Lázaro Gabino; Eduardo Ayala; Valeria Vanegas
- Cinematography: Fernando Hernández García
- Edited by: Andrea Rabasa Jofre; Bruno Santamaría Razo; Marilia Moraes
- Music by: Léo Chermont
- Production companies: Ojo de Vaca; Snowglobe; Desvia; Promenades Films
- Release date: 19 May 2026 (Cannes)
- Running time: 105 minutes
- Countries: Mexico; Brazil; Denmark
- Language: Spanish

Six Months in a Pink and Blue Building (Spanish: Seis meses en el edificio rosa con azul) is a 2026 coming-of-age autobiographical docudrama film written, produced, and directed by Bruno Santamaría Razo, in his fiction directorial debut. A co-production of Mexico, Brazil, and Denmark, it's based on Razo's own childhood memories as a queer teenager in the late 1990s, featuring interviews with his parents, it reconstructs the diagnose his father's HIV diagnosis.

The film had its world premiere at the Critics' Week section of the 2026 Cannes Film Festival on 19 May, where it was nominated for Caméra d'Or and Queer Palm.

== Premise ==
Set against the backdrop of Mexico City in 1996, Bruno, an 11-year-old boy queer teenager, develops feelings for his best friend Vladimir, while simultaneously grappling with the news of his father's HIV diagnosis.

== Cast ==
- Jade Reyes as Bruno
- Sofía Espinosa as Diana, Bruno's mother
- Lázaro Gabino as Mundo, Bruno's father
- Eduardo Ayala
- Valeria Vanegas
- Anuar Vera
- Teresa Sánchez
- Valentina Cohen
- Nara Carreira
- Demick Lopes

== Production ==
In an interview with Cineuropa, Razo explained that the film was inspired by a period in his childhood when his father was mistakenly diagnosed with HIV. In September 2022, the project was selected to participate at the San Sebastián International Film Festival's Europe-Latin America Co-Production Forum, receiving the Best Project and Dale! (Development Latin America-Europe) Award.

Mexican cinematographer Fernando Hernández García shot the film on 16mm.

== Release ==
Six Months in a Pink and Blue Building had its world premiere at the Critics' Week section of the 2026 Cannes Film Festival on 19 May. It is the first Mexican feature-length film to compete at the section, since Ernesto Contreras' Blue Eyelids in 2007. It also participated at the 2026 Cinélatino's Film in Progress section, where it won four awards.

In April 2026, Luxbox acquired the film's international sales rights. Prior to its premiere, Epicentre Films acquired the film's French distribution rights. It will be released in French theatres on 1 September 2026.
