= Mariana Rondón =

Venezuelan film director (born 1966)

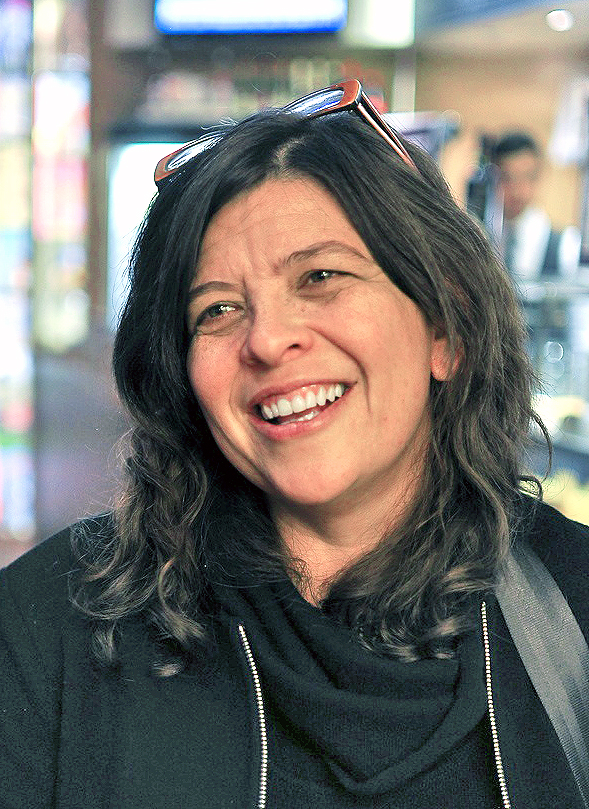
Mariana Rondón at the Discovery Zone Luxembourg city Film Festival 2014

Mariana Rondón (born 1966 in Barquisimeto, Lara state) is a Venezuelan film director, screenwriter, producer and visual artist. She studied at Escuela Internacional de Cine y Televisión (San Antonio de los Baños International School), in Cuba, and later animation in France. In 1990 she created the Andean Multinational Company “Sudaca Films” with Peruvian director Marité Ugás. They have made six feature-length films together, alternating in the roles of director and producer.

== Cinematography ==
Among Rondón's exploratory works are Calle 22 (Street 22), a short film which won an award at the Biarritz Festival in 1994 and A la media noche y media (At Midnight and a Half) in 1999.

In 2007, she directed and produced Postales de Leningrado (Postcards From Leningrad), an autobiographical film (her parents were members of the Venezuelan guerrilla movement Fuerzas Armadas de Liberación Nacional (FALN)) which was awarded the “Abrazo” Prize at the Latin American Cinema and Culture festival in Biarritz.

In 2011, she produced El chico que miente (The Kid Who Lies), directed by Marité Ugás. The film dramatized the Vargas Tragedy, a landslide disaster that struck the Venezuelan coast in December 1999.

In 2013, she released Pelo Malo (Bad Hair), which went on to win the Golden Shell award at the 61st San Sebastian Film Festival. It was the first Venezuelan film to win the award in sixty-one years. Set in Caracas, the film tells the story of a queer, Brown adolescent and his relationship with his aggressive mother. This was the source of controversy during heightened political tensions in Venezuela. Some said that it was a critique of Hugo Chávez. Others read the film as an example of poverty porn. Rondón herself explained that it was a plea for tolerance.

In 2020, she produced Contactado, directed by Marité Ugás. It was set and filmed in Peru.

In 2024, she released Zafari, which competed for the Horizontes Latinos Award at the 72nd San Sebastián International Film Festival.

In 2025, she directed Aún es de noche en Caracas (It Would Be Night in Caracas). It is based on a novel La hija de la española by Karina Sainz Borgo.
