= Lima Film Festival =

Annual film festival held in Lima, Peru

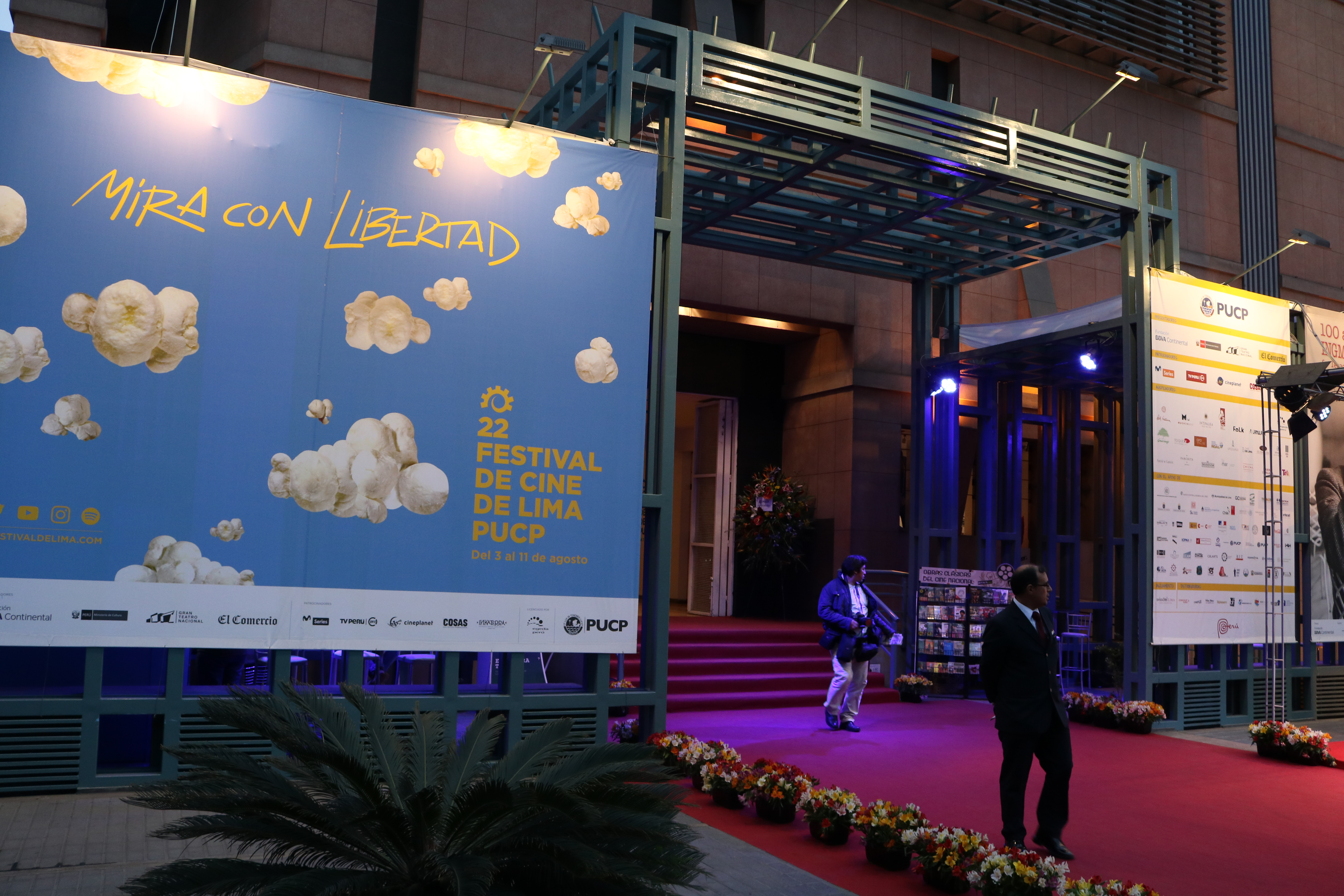
- Entrance of the PUCP Cultural Center in San Isidro during 2018 edition
- Frequency: Annual
- Locations: Lima, Peru
- Inaugurated: 1997
- Most recent: 30th Lima Film Festival
- Patron: Pontifical Catholic University of Peru
- Website: www.festivaldelima.com

The Lima Film Festival (Spanish: Festival de Cine de Lima) is a film festival held annually by the Pontifical Catholic University of Peru (PUCP). Its original name was Festival Elcine. The official name has been Festival of Lima, Encuentro Latinoamericano de Cine since 2007.

== The festival ==
The first festival was first held in 1997 under the name "Elcine Festival" at the PUCP Cultural Center in San Isidro District Lima, which continues to host the main festival. Conceived as a "Latin American Meeting of Cinema" the growth of the festival has expanded to the Centro Cultural de la PUCP, brought in Cineplanet, and various concert halls and cultural centers in Lima.

The festival is held annually in the first half of August. Being the main film event in Peru and one of the most important events in Lima's cultural calendar it is a noted festival for regional cinema in Latin America. The Festival launches & promotes the work of Peruvian directors, such as Claudia Llosa and Josué Méndez, and seeks to increase distribution of Latin American films in Peru and elsewhere. In addition to the films in competition, the festival includes screenings of international films, tributes to figures in the film industry, and other cultural activities such as master classes, lectures and art exhibitions.

== Competition and awards ==
The official competition includes two main categories—Fiction and Documentary—and all films must be Latin American.

The award from the festival is called "Trophy Spondylus", which consists of a stylized statue of a Spondylus, a marine mollusk widely used in the pre-Columbian art of Peru. This prize is awarded in various categories of the festival.

=== Categories ===
==== Official awards ====
- Best Picture
- Best Screenplay
- Best Cinematography
- Best Actor
- Best Actress
- Best First Film
- International Critics Prize for Best Film
- Best Documentary
- First Choice Award
- Second Choice Award

==== Other awards ====
- Award for Best Film CONACINE Peruana
- Films in Progress
- Peruvian Best Film voted by the Public
- Best Unfilmed Screenplay
