= 68th Ariel Awards =

2026 Mexican film awards

- Date: 3 October 2026
- Site: Estudios Churubusco, Mexico City
- Hosted by: Fernando Bonilla; Daniel Tovar; Fabrizio Santini; Elena del Río; Verónica Bravo; Giovanna Romo
- Organized by: Mexican Academy of Cinematographic Arts and Sciences

Highlights
- Best Picture: On the Road
- Most awards: On the Road (6)
- Most nominations: On the Road (13)

Television coverage
- Network: HBO Max

The 68th Ariel Awards ceremony, presented by the Mexican Academy of Cinematographic Arts and Sciences (AMACC), was held on 3 October 2026 at the Estudios Churubusco in Mexico City. The ceremony was hosted by Fernando Bonilla, Daniel Tovar, Fabrizio Santini, Elena del Río, Verónica Bravo, and Giovanna Romo. It was broadcast on HBO Max.

== Winners and nominations ==
The nominations were announced on 8 July 2026, by Luisa Huertas and Baltimore Beltrán at the Cineteca Nacional. The winners and nominees are listed as follows:

Best Picture: On the Road; The Devil Smokes (and Saves the Burnt Matches in the Same Box); La libertad de Fierro; The Blue Trail; Vanilla	Best Director: David Pablos — On the Road; Pablo Pérez Lombardini — La reserva; Ernesto Martínez Bucio — The Devil Smokes (and Saves the Burnt Matches in the Same Box); Gabriel Mascaro — The Blue Trail; Lucía Gajá — Vidas en la orilla
Best Actor: Osvaldo Sánchez — On the Road; Andrés Catzín — Cosmos; Ernesto Rocha — Adiós, amor; Hoze Meléndez — Crocodiles; Mauricio Isaac — Café Chairel	Best Actress: Diana Sedano — Juana; Ángela Molina — Cosmos; Emma Dib — Perpetual Adolescent; Mónica del Carmen — Las mutaciones; Natalia Reyes — It Would Be Night in Caracas
Best Supporting Actress: Ángeles Cruz — The Follies; Arcelia Ramírez — Crocodiles; Margarita Sanz — Juana; Ruth Ramos — Perpetual Adolescent; Teresita Sánchez — Crocodiles	Best Supporting Actor: Mariano López Sosa — On the Road; Bernardo Gamboa — The Devil Smokes (and Saves the Burnt Matches in the Same Box); Héctor Kotsifakis — Total Loss; Manuel Cruz Vivas — Crocodiles; Roberto Sosa — The Follies
Best Breakthrough Performance: Víctor Miguel Prieto Simental — On the Road; Aurora Dávila — Vanilla; Carolina Guzmán — La reserva; Donovan Said — The Devil Smokes (and Saves the Burnt Matches in the Same Box); Laura Uribe Rojas — The Devil Smokes (and Saves the Burnt Matches in the Same Box)	Best Cinematography: Ximena Amann — On the Road; Germinal Roaux, Inti Briones — Cosmos; Guillermo Garza — The Blue Trail; Juan Pablo Ramírez — It Would Be Night in Caracas; Moritz Tessendorf — La reserva
Best Original Screenplay: Gabriel Mascaro, Tibério Azul — The Blue Trail; David Pablos — On the Road; Ernesto Martínez Bucio, Karen Plata — The Devil Smokes (and Saves the Burnt Matches in the Same Box); Germinal Roaux — Cosmos; Pablo Pérez Lombardini — La reserva	Best Adapted Screenplay: Jimena Montemayor Loyo — Mujeres del alba; Javier Peñalosa, Mariana Chenillo — Lucca's World; Jorge Hernández Aldana — The Shadow of Catire; Jorge Ramírez-Suárez — Las mutaciones; Mariana Josefina Rondón García, María Teresa Ugás Castro — It Would Be Night in Caracas
Best Original Score: Yom — La reserva; Andrea Balency-Béarn — On the Road; María Giménez Cacho Goded — Juana; Memo Guerra — The Blue Trail; Yolihuani Curiel Balzareti — Brigada 2045	Best First Work: La reserva; Crocodiles; The Devil Smokes (and Saves the Burnt Matches in the Same Box); Juana; Vanilla
Best Sound: Alex de Icaza, David Montero — Autos, mota y rocanrol; Antonio Porém Pirez, Lena Esquenazi, Nayuribe Montero — It Would Be Night in Caracas; Arturo Salazar, Liliana Villaseñor, María Alejandra Rojas, Vincent Sinceretti — The Blue Trail; Carlos Cortés Navarrete, Miguel Mata, Odín Acosta Ascencio — Brigada 2045; Denis Sechaud, Iván Dumas, Raphaël Sohier — Cosmos	Best Editing: Omar Guzmán, Sebastián Sepúlveda — The Blue Trail; Alfonso Gastiaburo, Ana García, Lucía Gajá — Vidas en la orilla; Ernesto Martínez Bucio, Karen Plata, Odei Zabaleta — The Devil Smokes (and Saves the Burnt Matches in the Same Box); Jonathan Pellicer — On the Road; Jorge Márquéz — Gerry Adams: A Ballymurphy Man
Best Art Direction: Christian Alfredo Galindo García, Consuelo Iliana Martínez Ruiz — Autos, mota y rocanrol; Belén Estrada — On the Road; Daniela Rojas — Juana; Ezra Buenrostro — It Would Be Night in Caracas; Salvador Parra — Vanilla	Best Makeup: Karina E. Monroy — Autos, mota y rocanrol; Adam Zoller — On the Road; Alejandra Velarde — Vanilla; Gerardo Muñoz — Un cuento de pescadores; Karina Rodríguez — It Would Be Night in Caracas
Best Costume Design: Gilda Navarro, Joanna Nogueiras Yankelevich — Autos, mota y rocanrol; Brenda Gómez — It Would Be Night in Caracas; Felipe Criado — On the Road; Felipe Criado — Cosmos; Gilda Navarro — Vanilla	Best Special Effects: Arturo Vázquez — Counterstrike; Gerardo Muñoz, Omar Israel Ayala de la Peña — Un cuento de pescadores; José Martínez "Josh" — Mujeres del alba; Luis Ambriz — Crocodiles; Ricardo Arvizu — It Would Be Night in Caracas
Best Visual Effects: Amet Ramos — Un cuento de pescadores; Gastón Álvarez — Autos, mota y rocanrol; Jorge Palma Bermúdez — On the Road; María José Straffon — I Am Frankelda; Paula Siqueira, Raúl "Ratón" Luna — It Would Be Night in Caracas	Best Documentary Feature: La libertad de Fierro; Brigada 2045; Gaza, la franja del exterminio; Llamarse Olimpia; Vidas en la orilla
Best Animated Feature Film: I Am Frankelda; La gran historia de la filosofía occidental	Best Short Film: Azul; Crónica Menos; Oc ni temiki (Sigo soñando); Techiq; Una torreta en llamas
Best Animated Short Film: Desdoblándome; Teatro Secreto; Azulesepia; Te prometo violencia; Wing Shop	Best Documentary Short Film: Las voces del despeñadero; La Mar; Mácula; Mujer de barro; Toda la vida para siempre
Best Ibero-American Film: A Poet (Colombia); Belén (Argentina); The Mysterious Gaze of the Flamingo (Chile); Sundays (Spain); Manas (Brazil)

=== Films with multiple nominations and awards ===
Films with multiple nominations
Nominations	Film
13	On the Road
9	It Would Be Night in Caracas
8	The Devil Smokes
7	The Blue Trail
6	Crocodriles
6	Cosmos
6	La reserva
6	Vanilla
5	Autos, mota y rocanrol
5	Juana
3	Brigada 2045
3	Un cuento de pescadores
3	Vidas en la orilla
2	Perpetual Adolescent
2	La libertad de Fierro
2	The Follies
2	Las mutaciones
2	Mujeres del alba
2	I Am Frankelda

Films with multiple awards
Nominations	Film
6	On the Road
4	Autos, mota y rocanrol
3	La reserva
2	The Blue Trail

=== Special awards ===
The AMACC announced Rosita Arenas as a Golden Ariel recipient, recognizing her as a "trailblazing choreographer and actor, whose work has captivated generations and crossed genres". It also awarded another Golden Ariel to Demetrio Bilbatúa for being "the great visual chronicler of modern Mexico".
