= 56th International Film Festival of India =

2025 Indian film festival

- Official poster
- Opening film: The Blue Trail by Gabriel Mascaro
- Closing film: A Useful Ghost
- Location: Dr. Shyama Prasad Mukherjee Indoor Stadium at Panaji, Goa, India
- Founded: 1952
- Awards: Golden Peacock: Skin of Youth; Silver Peacock: Best Director: Santosh Davakhar; Best Actor: Ubeimar Ríos; Best Actress: Jara Sofija Ostan; Best Debut Film of a Director: Hesam Farahmand and Tõnis Pill; Satyajit Ray Lifetime Achievement Award: Rajinikanth; Special Recognition for Contribution to Bharatiya Cinema Award: Nandamuri Balakrishna
- Hosted by: Government of Goa; Directorate of Film Festivals
- No. of films: 240
- Festival date: Opening: 20 November 2025; Closing: 28 November 2025
- Website: iffigoa.org

International Film Festival of India
- 57th 55th

The 56th International Film Festival of India took place from 20 to 28 November 2025 at Panaji, Goa. In place of its customary indoor stadium launch, the opening ceremony was presented this year as a carnival parade. The festival opened with the screening of the 2025 dystopian drama film The Blue Trail by Gabriel Mascaro. Indian filmmaker Rakeysh Omprakash Mehra served as the chairperson of the International Jury. The festival presented more than 240 films from 81 countries, including 13 world premieres, 5 international premieres and 44 Asian premieres.

Japan was designated as the 'Country of Focus' at this edition of the festival, and it will present six curated titles. In addition Spain will be the Partner Country, with Australia as the Spotlight Country. The festival also celebrated centenaries and honoured cinematic legends such as Guru Dutt, Raj Khosla, Ritwik Ghatak, P. Bhanumathi, Bhupen Hazarika, and Salil Chowdhury with special retrospectives of their works.

The closing ceremony on 28 November featured a felicitation of actor Rajinikanth, recognizing his contributions to cinema over the past five decades. The festival concluded with the announcement of various awards. Golden Peacock for the best feature film was won by the Vietnamese transgender sex romance film Skin of Youth by Ash Mayfair. A Useful Ghost, a Thai supernatural black comedy-drama by Ratchapoom Boonbunchachoke was screened as the closing film of the festival.

== Overview ==
The 56th edition of the festival showcased 15 curated and competitive sections, including International Competition, Best Debut Feature Film, and the ICFT UNESCO Gandhi Medal. Special categories included featured categories viz: Macabre Dreams, Docu-Montage, Experimental cinema, UNICEF-supported films, and Restored classics. The Gala Premieres section included 18 films, featuring 13 world premieres and two Asia premieres. The Indian Panorama presented 25 feature films, 20 non-feature films, and five debut features. More than 50 films by women directors and over 50 debut works were shown in the international lineup. The festival also hosted 21 masterclasses.

== Opening and closing ceremonies ==
=== Opening ceremony ===
For the first time in its history, the festival, departing from the tradition of hosting opening ceremony in enclosed venue. commenced with a carnival 26-float parade on 20 November 2025. It featured floats from production houses, state representatives, cultural groups, cinematic heritage and the world of animation. It was hosted by Abhinandan Singh and Akshata Prabhu.The parade proceeded through the lanes and alleyways of Panaji, Goa, reminiscent of its carnival. Opening ceremony was attended by Anupam Kher and Jackie Shroff. Indian actor, film producer Nandamuri Balakrishna was felicitated at the parade for his outstanding contribution to Indian cinema.

=== Closing ceremony ===
The festival ended with a vibrant display of India’s cultural diversity, featuring folk traditions, classical dances from different regions, and performances by divyang artists. It concluded with the announcement of the awards and the screening of the Thai film A Useful Ghost, directed by Ratchapoom Boonbunchachoke.

== Jury ==
=== International Jury ===
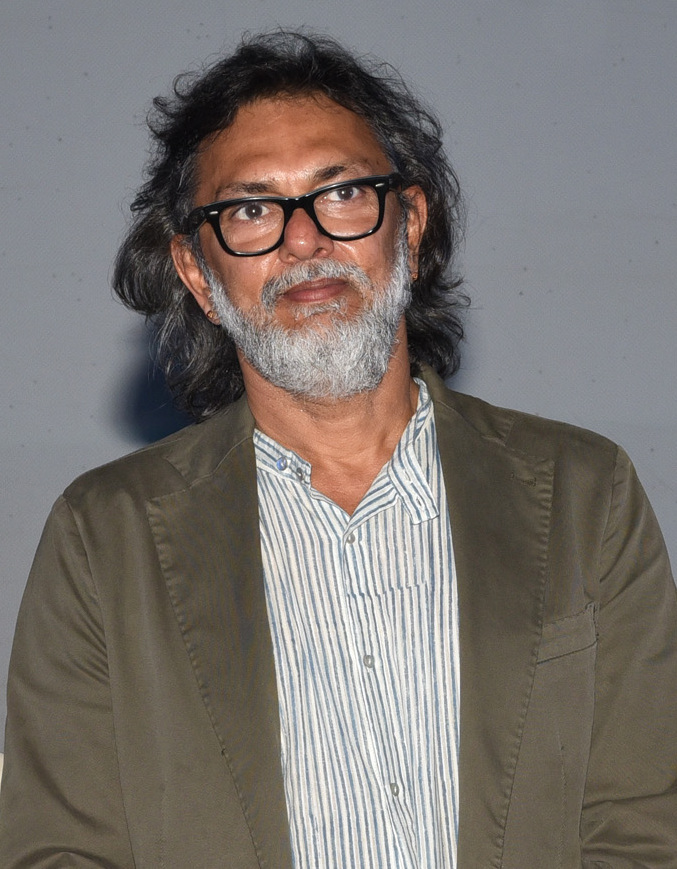
Rakeysh Omprakash Mehra, Chairman of jury

- Rakeysh Omprakash Mehra, Indian film director, occasional actor and screenwriter, Chairperson
- Graeme Clifford, Australian film director
- Remi Adefarasin, English cinematographer
- Katharina Schüttler, German television and film actress
- Chandran Rutnam, Sri Lankan filmmaker and entrepreneur

=== ICFT UNESCO Gandhi Medal jury ===
- Ahmed Bedjaoui, artistic director of the International Film Festival of Algiers, chairperson
- Xueyan Hun, Platform for Creativity and Innovation, CICT-ICFT youth branch
- Serge Michel, vice president of UNICA;
- Tobias Biancone, former director-general of the International Theatre Institute
- Georges Dupont, director-general of ICFT and former senior international civil servant at UNESCO

=== Feature film jury ===
- Raja Bundela, Indian actor, producer, politician and civil activist, chairperson
- Malay Ray, Cinematographer
- Subhash Sehgal, film editor
- Jadumani Dutta, filmmaker
- Krishna Hebbal, actor
- Kamlesh K Mishra, filmmaker
- Arun Bakshi, actor, singer
- Asim Sinha, actor
- Ashok Sharan, producer
- Sukumar Jatania, cinematographer
- B S Basavaraju, cinematographer

=== Non-feature film jury ===
- Dharam Gulati, Cinematographer, chairperson
- Anjali Panjabi, Filmmaker & Producer
- Bobby Sarma Baruah, Filmmaker
- Rekha Gupta, Film Critic and Film Curator
- Ashok Cashyap, Film Producer, Filmmaker and Cinematographer
- A. Karthik Raaja, Cinematographer
- Jyotsana Garg, Filmmaker

=== Web Series jury ===
- Bharatbala Ganapathy, Indian film filmmaker-producer – Chairperson
- R Mahendran, Producer
- Munjal Shroff, Director and Producer
- Rajeshwari Sachdev, Actor
- Sekhar Kumar Das, Writer and Director

== Screening venues ==
The following venues will host the festival screenings.

- Inox Panjim,
- Maquinez Palace
- Inox Porvorim
- Z-Square Samrat Ashok
- Ravindra Bhavan Madgaon
- Open-air screenings
  - Miramar Beach
  - Ravindra Bhavan, Margao
  - Vagator Beach (Helipad)

== Official selection ==
=== Opening midfest and closing films ===
The opening and closing films of the festival are:

English title	Original title	Director(s)	Production countrie(s)
Opening film
The Blue Trail	O Último Azul	Gabriel Mascaro	Brazil, Mexico, Chile, Netherlands
Midfest film
Sirāt		Oliver Laxe	Spain, France
Closing film
A Useful Ghost	ผีใช้ได้ค่ะ	Ratchapoom Boonbunchachoke	Thailand, France, Singapore, Germany

=== International competition ===
15 feature films will compete for the Golden Peacock award.

English title	Original title	Director(s)	Production countrie(s)
Amaran	Tamil	Rajkumar Periasamy	Raaj Kamal Films International
Amrum		Fatih Akin	Germany
C'est Si Bon!	Moi qui t'aimais	Diane Kurys	France
Gondhal	गोंधळ	Santosh Davakhar	India
Little Trouble Girls	Kaj ti je deklica	Urška Djukić	Slovenia, Italy, Croatia, Serbia
Mosquitoes	Le Bambine	Valentina Bertani and Nicole Bertani	Italy, Switzerland, France
Mother's Baby		Johanna Moder	Austria, Switzerland, Germany
My Father's Shadow		Akinola Davies Jr.	United Kingdom, Ireland, Nigeria
A Poet	Un Poeta	Simón Mesa Soto	Colombia, Germany, Sweden
Renoir	ルノワール	Chie Hayakawa	Japan, Australia, France, Singapore, Philippines, Indonesia
Sarkeet		Thamar KV	India
Sham		Takashi Miike	Japan
Skin of Youth	Ồn Ào Tuổi Trẻ	Ash Mayfair	Vietnam, Singapore, Japan
Songs of Adam		Oday Rasheed	Iraq
The Visual Feminist Manifesto		Farida Baqi	Syria, Lebanon, Germany

=== Best Debut Feature Film of a Director ===
This section will feature seven first-time filmmakers from the world of cinema.

English title	Original title	Director(s)	Production countrie(s)
Ata Thambaycha Naay!	आता थांबायचं नाय!	Shivraj Waichal	India
The Devil Smokes (and Saves the Burnt Matches in the Same Box)	El diablo fuma (y guarda las cabezas de los cerillos quemados en la misma caja)	Ernesto Martínez Bucio	Mexico
Fury	La furia	Gemma Blasco	Spain
Fränk		Tõnis Pill	Estonia
Karla		Christina Tournatzés	Germany
My Daughter’s Hair	رها	Hesam Farahmand	Iran
Shape of Momo		Tribeny Rai	India

=== ICFT UNESCO Gandhi Medal ===
10 films are competing for the IFFI ICFT UNESCO Gandhi Medal:

English title	Original title	Director(s)	Production countrie(s)
Brides		Nadia Fall	United Kingdom
Hana		Ujkan Hysaj	Kosovo
In Search of the Sky	Vimukt	Jitank Singh Gurjar	India
K Poper		Ebrahim Amini	Iran
The President's Cake	مملكة القصب	Hasan Hadi	Iraq, Qatar, United States
Safe House		Eirik Svensson	Norway
Tanvi the Great		Anupam Kher	India
The Wave	La ola	Sebastián Lelio	Chile, United States
White Snow		Praveen Morchhale	India
Yakushima's Illusion	L'Illusion de Yakushima	Naomi Kawase	France, Japan, Belgium, Luxembourg

=== From The Festivals - 2025 ===
English title	Original title	Director(s)	Production countrie(s)
Black Rabbit, White Rabbit		Shahram Mokri	Tajikistan, United Arab Emirates
The Blue Trail	O Último Azul	Gabriel Mascaro	Brazil, Mexico, Chile, Netherlands
Dreams (Sex Love)	Drømmer	Dag Johan Haugerud	Norway
Father Mother Sister Brother		Jim Jarmusch	United States, Ireland, France
Fiume o morte!	Rijeka	Igor Bezinović	Croatia, Italy, Slovenia
Gloaming in Luomu	罗目的黄昏	Zhang Lü	China
It Was Just an Accident	یک تصادف ساده	Jafar Panahi	Iran, France, Luxembourg
Katanga: The Dance of the Scorpions	Katanga - La danse des scorpions	Dani Kouyaté	Burkina Faso
Kontinental '25		Radu Jude	Romania, Brazil, Switzerland, United Kingdom, Luxembourg
Magellan	Magalhães	Lav Diaz	Portugal, Spain, Philippines, France
The Mastermind		Kelly Reichardt	United States, United Kingdom
The Message	El mensaje	Iván Fund	Argentina, Spain
Miroirs No. 3		Christian Petzold	Germany
No Other Choice	어쩔수가없다	Park Chan-wook	South Korea
Sentimental Value	Affeksjonsverdi	Joachim Trier	Norway, France, Germany, Denmark, Sweden, United Kingdom
Sirāt		Oliver Laxe	Spain, France
Sound of Falling	In die Sonne schauen	Mascha Schilinski	Germany
White Snail		Elsa Kremser and Levin Peter	Austria, Germany
Woman and Child	زن و بچه	Saeed Roustayi	Iran, France, Germany

=== Indian Panorama ===
In Indian Panorama feature and non-feature films of cinematic, thematic, and aesthetic excellence are selected for the promotion of film art through the non-profit screening of these films under different categories.

==== Feature films ====
Title of the Film	Language	Director(s)	Producer(s)
Amaran (Opening film)	Tamil	Rajkumar Periasamy	Raaj Kamal Films International
Gondhal	गोंधळ	Santosh Davakhar	India
Sarkeet	Malayalam	Thamar KV	Ajith Vinayaka Films
Vimukt	Braj-language	Jitank Singh Gurjar	Canvas Creation
The Bengal Files	Hindi	Vivek Ranjan Agnihotri	Abhishek Agarwal Arts
Oitharei	Manipuri	Dinesh Naorem	Gibanlata Thokchom
Maliput Melodies	Odia	Vishal Patnaik	Kaustav Dreamworks Studios

==== Mainstream Cinema Section ====
Title of the Film	Language	Director(s)	Producer(s)
Ata Thambaycha Naay!	Marathi	Shivraj Waichal	Chalk and Cheese Films
Chhaava	Hindi	Laxman Utekar	Maddock Films
Sikaar	Assamese	Debangkar Borgohain	Unicorn Motion Pictures
Sankranthiki Vasthunam	Telugu	Anil Ravipudi	Sri Venkateswara Creations
Thudarum	Malayalam	Tharun Moorthy	Rejaputhra Visual Media

==== Non-feature Films ====
Title of the Film	Language	Director(s)
Aanirai	Tamil	E. V. Ganesh Babu
Battlefield	Manipuri	Borun Thokchom
Chambal	Hindi	Anhad Mishra
Kakori (Opening film)	Hindi	Kamlesh K. Mishra
Nilgiris - A Shared Wilderness	English, Tamil	Sandesh Kadur
Ummathat	Kodava	Prakash Kariappa

==== Best Debut Director ====
English title	Original title	Director(s)	Production countrie(s)
A.R.M		Jithin Lal	India
Committee Kurrollu		Yadhu Vamsee	India
Shape of Momo		Tribeny Rai	India
Binodiini	Binodiini: Ekti Natir Upakhyan	Ram Kamal Mukherjee	India

=== Best Web Series OTT ===
English title	Original title	Director(s)	Network
Bandish Bandits (Season 2)		Anand Tiwari	Prime Video
Black Warrant		Vikramaditya Motwane	Netflix
Paatal Lok (Season 2)		Avinash Arun	Prime Video
Suzhal: The Vortex (Season 2)		Bramma G.	Prime Video

=== Docu–Montage ===
This section comprises documentaries & docu-drama.

English title	Original title	Director(s)	Production countrie(s)
And There Was Evening And There Was Morning. The First Day		Youhanna Nagy	Egypt
Below the Clouds	Sotto le nuvole	Gianfranco Rosi	Italy
Croma		Manuel Abramovich	Argentina, Germany, Austria
Forensics		Federico Atehortúa Arteaga	Columbia
Gods of Stone		Iván Castiñeiras Gallego	Spain, France, Portugal
Ku Handza		André Guiomar	Portugal
Lullaby for the Mountains		Hayk Matevosyan	Armenia, United States
Morichales		Chris Gude	United States, Colombia

=== Experimental Films – 2025 ===
English title	Original title	Director(s)	Production countrie(s)
Dreaming Is Not Sleeping		Rouzbeh Rashidi	Ireland, Germany, Poland, and Denmark
Mare's Nest		Ben Rivers	United Kingdom, France, Canada

=== Rising Stars ===
English title	Original title	Director(s)	Production countrie(s)
Blue Heron		Sophy Romvari	Canada, Hungary
Living the Land	生息之地	Huo Meng	China
Sand City		Mahde Hasan	Bangladesh
Sweetheart	Gioia mia	Margherita Spampinato	Italy

=== Cinema of the World ===
The following films were selected in this section:

English title	Original title	Director(s)	Production countrie(s)
Amoeba	核	Siyou Tan	Singapore, Netherlands, France, Spain, South Korea
Becoming	Vosten	Zhannat Alshanova	Kazakhstan
Calle Málaga		Maryam Touzani	Morocco, France, Spain, Germany, Belgium
Calorie		Eisha Marjara	Canada
The Chronology of Water		Kristen Stewart	France, Latvia, United Kingdom, United States
DJ Ahmet		Georgi M. Unkovski	North Macedonia, Czech Republic, Serbia, Croatia
Enzo		Robin Campillo	France, Italy, Belgium
Flood	Potopa	Martin Gonda	Slovakia, Czech Republic, Poland, Belgium
Girl	女孩	Shu Qi	Taiwan, China
Girls on Wire	想飞的女孩	Vivian Qu	China
In Pursuit of Spring	Bahorni quvib	Ayub Shahobiddinov	Uzbekistan
The Janitor	El Conserje	Mauro Mueller & David Figueroa García	Mexico, Switzerland
The Ivy	Hiedra	Ana Cristina Barragán	Ecuador, Mexico, France, Spain
The Last Viking	Den Sidste Viking	Anders Thomas Jensen	Denmark, Sweden
Late Shift	Heldin	Petra Volpe	Switzerland, Germany
The Little Sister	La Petite Dernière	Hafsia Herzi	France, Germany
Lucky Lu		Lloyd Lee Choi	United States, Canada
Memory of Princess Mumbi		Damien Hauser	Kenya, Switzerland
Phantoms of July	Sehnsucht in Sangerhausen	Julian Radlmaier	Germany
Rains Over Babel	Llueve sobre Babel	Gala del Sol	Colombia, United States, Spain
Solomamma		Janicke Askevold	Norway, Latvia, Lithuania, Denmark, Finland

=== Gala Premiere ===
The following films were selected in this section:

English title	Original title	Director(s)	Production countrie(s)
The Family Man (Season 3)		Raj & DK	India
Asambhav		Sachit Patil, Pushkar Shrotri	India
Bindusagar		Abhishek Swain	India
1942: A Love Story (1994)		Vidhu Vinod Chopra	India
Sholay (1975)		Ramesh Sippy	India
120 Bahadur		Razneesh Ghai	India
Gustaakh Ishq		Vibhu Puri	India
Hanti Hanti Pa Pa		Arnab Middya	India
Spying Stars		Vimukthi Jayasundara	Sri Lanka, France, India
Papa Buka		Dr. Biju	Papua New Guinea, India
Andhra King Taluka		Mahesh Babu Pachigolla	India
This Tempting Madness		Jennifer E. Montgomery	United States
Tere Ishk Mein		Aanand L. Rai	India
Vadh 2		Jaspal Singh Sandhu	India

=== Mission Life ===
English title	Original title	Director(s)	Production countrie(s)
Better Go Mad in the Wild	Raději zešílet v divočině	Miro Remo	Czech Republic, Slovakia
The Botanist	植物学家	Jing Yi	China
Hair, Paper, Water...	Tóc, Giấy và Nước	Nicolas Graux and Minh Quý Trương	'Belgium, France, Vietnam
Hen	Kota	György Pálfi	Germany, Greece, Hungary
The Memory of Butterflies	La memoria de las mariposas	Tatiana Fuentes Sadowski	Peru, Portugal
Silent Friend	Stille Freundin	Ildikó Enyedi	Germany, France, Hungary

=== Macabre Dreams ===
English title	Original title	Director(s)	Production countrie(s)
Alpha		Julia Ducournau	France, Belgium
The Book of Sijjin & Illiyyin	Kitab Sijjin & Illiyyin	Hadrah Daeng Ratu	Indonesia
Gorgonà		Evi Kalogiropoulou	Greece, France
The Invisible Half		Masaki Nishiyama	Japan
New Group		Yûta Shimotsu	Japan
Reflection in a Dead Diamond	Reflet dans un diamant mort	Hélène Cattet and Bruno Forzani	Belgium, Luxembourg, Italy, France

=== UNICEF @ IFFI ===
English title	Original title	Director(s)	Production countrie(s)
The Beetle Project		Jin Kwang-kyo	South Korea
Happy Birthday	هابي بيرث داي	Sarah Goher	Egypt
The Odyssey of Joy	Odiseja e Gëzimit	Zgjim Terziqi	Kosovo, France

=== Restored classics ===
Year	English title	Original title	Director(s)	Production countrie(s)
1994	Muriel's Wedding		P. J. Hogan	Australia
1994	Pulp Fiction		Quentin Tarantino	United States
2000	Yi Yi	Yī Yī	Edward Yang	Taiwan, Japan

=== Special Presentation ===
Year	English title	Original title	Director(s)	Production countrie(s)
1936	Achhut Kannya		Franz Osten	India
1956	C.I.D.		Raj Khosla	India
1946	Dr. Kotnis Ki Amar Kahani		V. Shantaram	India
1990	Ek Doctor Ki Maut		Tapan Sinha	India
1992	Ek Hota Vidushak		Jabbar Patel	India
1978	Gaman		Muzaffar Ali	India
1989	Kireedam		Sibi Malayil	India
1957	Musafir		Hrishikesh Mukherjee	India
1957	Pyaasa		Guru Dutt	India

== Country of focus ==
Japan is nominated as the "Country of Focus" for the festival.

English title	Original title	Director(s)	Production countrie(s)
A Pale View of Hills	遠い山なみの光	Kei Ishikawa	Japan, United Kingdom, Poland
Dear Stranger		Tetsuya Mariko	Japan, United States, Taiwan
Catching the Stars of This Summer	この夏の星を見る	Tsujimura Mizuki	Japan
Seaside Serendipity	海辺へ行く道	Satoko Yokohama	Japan
Tiger	Taiga	Anshul Chauhan	Japan
Two Seasons, Two Strangers	旅と日々	Sho Miyake	Japan

== Partner Country (Spain) - 2025 ==
Spain is partner Country of the festival

English title	Original title	Director(s)	Production countrie(s)
Fury	La furia	Gemma Blasco	Spain
Gods of Stone	Deuses de Pedra	Iván Castiñeiras	Spain
Sirāt		Oliver Laxe	Spain, France
Sleepless City	Ciudad sin sueño	Guillermo Galoe	Spain, France

== Awards and winners ==
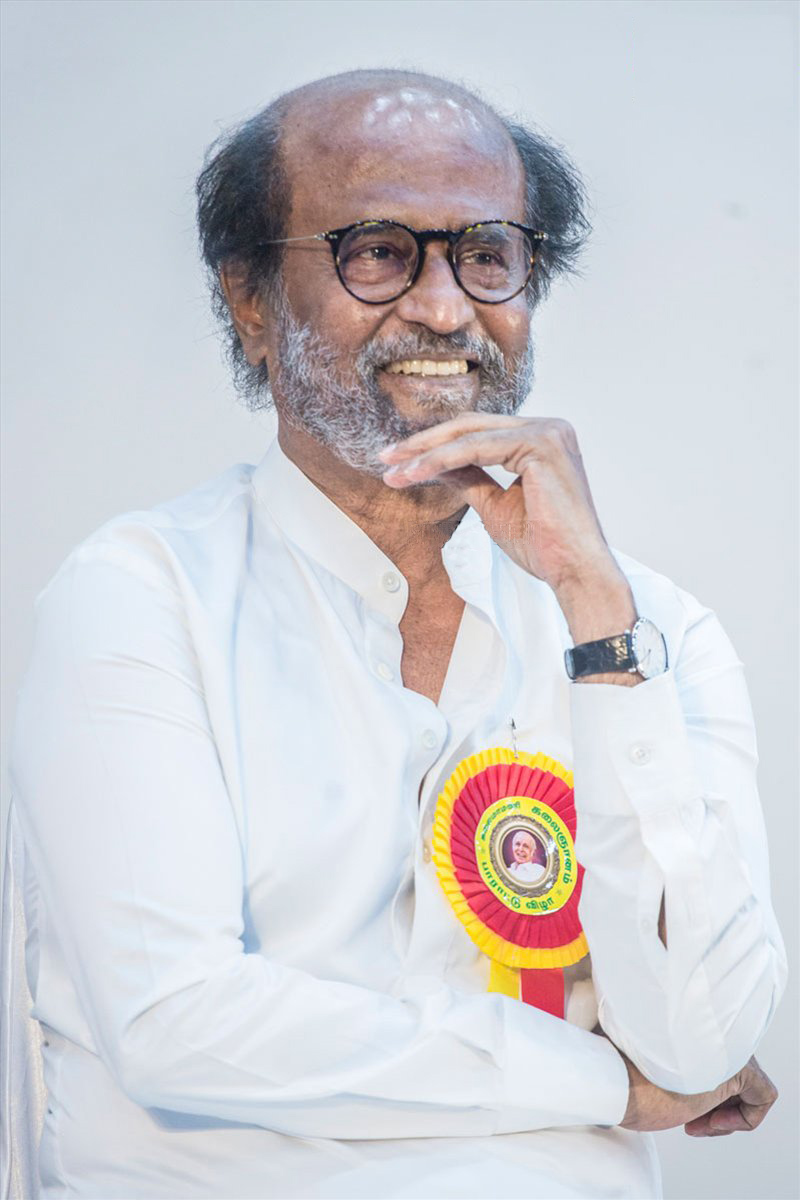
Rajinikanth, recipient of Satyajit Ray Lifetime Achievement Award

The festival concluded with awards ceremony honouring the following awardees:

- Golden Peacock (Best Film): Skin of Youth by Ash Mayfair, Vietnam, Singapore, Japan
- Best Director: Santosh Davakhar for Gondhal, India
- Best Actor: Ubeimar Rios for A Poet
- Best Actress: Jara Sofija Ostan for Little Trouble Girls
- Best Debut Film of a Director:
  - Hesam Farahmand for My Daughter’s Hair
  - Tõnis Pill for Fränk
- Best Debut Director of Indian Feature Film: Karan Singh Tyagi for Kesari Chapter 2
- Special Jury Award: My Father's Shadow by Akinola Davies Jr., United Kingdom, Ireland, Nigeria
- ICFT UNESCO Gandhi Medal: Safe House by Eirik Svensson, Norway
- Best Web Series Award: Bandish Bandits (Season 2) by Anand Tiwari
- Satyajit Ray Lifetime Achievement Award: Rajinikanth
- Special Recognition for Contribution to Bharatiya Cinema Award: Nandamuri Balakrishna
