= 14th Macondo Awards =

- Date: October 25, 2026
- Site: Cali, Colombia
- Hosted by: Juana Acosta; Manolo Cardona

Highlights
- Best Film: A Poet
- Most awards: A Poet (7)
- Most nominations: Adiós al amigo (12); Horizonte (12)

Television coverage
- Network: DITU, Caracol Televisión HD2, Caracol Internacional, regional public channels

The 14th Macondo Awards ceremony, presented by the Colombian Academy of Cinematography Arts and Sciences, recognized artistic, technical and narrative excellence in Colombian cinema. It took place on October 25, 2026, in Cali. The nominations, announced in August 2026, were led by Horizonte, Un poeta and Adiós al amigo.

The ceremony was hosted by Colombian actors Juana Acosta and Manolo Cardona, and was broadcast on DITU, Caracol Televisión HD2, Caracol Internacional and the eight regional public television channels.

== Winners and nominees ==
Best Picture: A Poet – Ocúltimo S.A.S.; Adiós al amigo – La Contrabanda S.A.S.; Horizonte – Inercia Películas; Rains Over Babel – Gala del Sol Films	Best Director: Simón Mesa Soto – A Poet; César Augusto Acevedo – Horizonte; Gala del Sol – Rains Over Babel; Iván David Gaona – Adiós al amigo
Best Actor: Ubeimar Ríos – A Poet; Claudio Cataño – Horizonte; Julián Díaz – Lactar; Nelson Camayo – Entre 2 aguas	Best Actress: Rebeca Andrade – A Poet; Ana Harlen – Entre 2 aguas; Flora Martínez – ¡Basta mamá!; Marcela Benjumea – ¡Basta mamá!
Best Supporting Actor: Cristian Hernández – Adiós al amigo; Bernardo García – ¡Basta mamá!; Emmanuel Restrepo – Susana y Elvira sin plan B; Felipe Aguilar – Rains Over Babel	Best Supporting Actress: Allison Correa – A Poet; Ángela Cano – Horizonte; Carmenza Gómez – Un padre muy madre; María Victoria Hernández – Horizonte
Best Screenplay: Simón Mesa Soto – A Poet; César Augusto Acevedo – Horizonte; Gala del Sol – Rains Over Babel; Iván David Gaona – Adiós al amigo	Best Cinematography: Mateo Guzmán – Horizonte; Juan Carlos Martínez – Golán; Juan Sarmiento – A Poet; Sonia Pérez – Susana y Elvira sin plan B
Best Editing: Ricardo Saraiva – A Poet; Carlos Cordero, David Rojas – El juego de la vida; Isabel Otálvaro – Andariega; Soledad Salfate, Camila Beltrán – Horizonte	Best Production Design: Marcela Gómez – Horizonte; Daniel Rincón – Querido trópico; Jaime Luna – Rains Over Babel; Juan David Bernal – Adiós al amigo
Best Sound (sound design, production sound and sound mixing): Daniel Garcés Najar, José Jairo Flórez Flórez, José Valenzuela – Adiós al amigo; Alex Maury, César Salazar – Golán; Gerry Vásquez, James Parnell, Daniel Prieto, Daniel Vásquez, Sebastián Alzate – Rains Over Babel; Juan Manuel López, Daniel Giraldo, Daniel Vásquez – Andariega	Best Costume Design: Diana Oliva – Adiós al amigo; Juliana Giraldo, Susana Valencia – A Poet; Julián Grijalba – Culebra negra; Julián Grijalba – Horizonte
Best Makeup: Lina Cadavid – Horizonte; Diana Parra – Querido trópico; Lili Bonil – Adiós al amigo; Manuela Muñoz – Culebra negra	Best Original Score: Edson Velandia, Camilo Escobar – Adiós al amigo; Daniel Velasco – Entre 2 aguas; Matti Bye, Johanna Ekholm, Gustav Davidsson, Pelle Westlin – A Poet; María Linares – Susana y Elvira sin plan B
Best Original Song: Edson Velandia – Adiós al amigo; Andrés Martínez, María Elena Doering – Lactar; Manuela E. Aguirre – Entre 2 aguas; Matti Bye – A Poet	Best Visual Effects: Juan Manuel Betancourt, Hadi Abou Ghazale, Pascal Giroux – Horizonte; Fabio Andrés Escobar Charry – Brigitte, planeta B; Iván David Mejía – Adiós al amigo; Víctor Forigua – Querido trópico
Best Documentary: El juego de la vida – Séptima Films S.A.S.; Andariega – Briosa Films; Mûpã (Madre) – Fahrenheit Films S.A.S.; Soñé su nombre – Sandelion Productions	Best Ibero-American Picture – FIACINE: O Agente Secreto (Brazil); Aún es de noche en Caracas (Venezuela); Belén (Argentina); Los domingos (Spain)
Best Short Film: Sukua – La Fortaleza Films; Agachar el rostro – Nebula Cine; Malas posturas – La Misma Gente Films; Mi amigo, el arquitecto – Mediocielo Cine	Best Animated Short Film: Una vez en un cuerpo – Pez Dorado Animaciones; Calostro – Diego Felipe Cortés; Quimera – Sofía Abril Osuna; Tuktu, padre maíz – Cintadhesiva Comunicaciones
Best Documentary Short Film: Mi viche todo el día – Vértigo Cine; Sombras en la niebla – Magdalena Cine S.A.S.; Un aparato para detectar fantasmas – Cosmodromo Cine; Ya se ven los tigres en la lluvia – Contravía Films	Sustainable Macondo: Golán – Diana Montenegro García (producer); Adiós al amigo – Mónica Juanita Hernández Duquino (producer); Corozo – Lorena Villanueva (producer); Culebra negra – David Hurts (producer); Entre 2 aguas – Carlos Gabriel Vergara; Legal – Jennifer Arenas (producer); Rains Over Babel – H.A. Hermida (producer); Reflejos – Iván Acosta, Miguel Urrutia (producers)
Audience Award – Best Film: El juego de la vida – Séptima Films S.A.S.	Honorary Macondo: Sergio Cabrera
Macondo for Trades: Carlos Congote	

== See also ==
- List of Colombian films
- Macondo Awards
- 2026 in film
