= Prakash Kariappa =

Indian actor, film director, film producer and writer (born 1965)

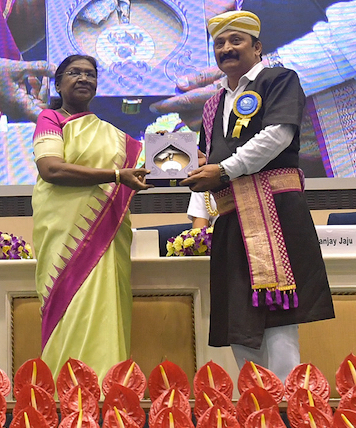
- Prakash Kariappa receiving National Film Award from the President of India
- Born: Prakash Kariappa Kottukathira; 20 September 1965 (age 60); Madikeri, Karnataka,
- Occupations: Film Producer; Actor; Director; Writer; Entrepreneur
- Years active: 2016–present
- Spouse: Yeshoda Prakash (m. 2004)
- Children: 2
- Awards: National Film Awards (1); Karnataka State Film Award (1)

Prakash Kariappa Kottukathira (born 20 September 1965) is an Indian film producer, actor, director, writer, entrepreneur and veteran of the Indian Army. He has worked primarily in Kodava and Kannada cinema and is noted for his contributions to the Kodava film industry. Along with his wife, filmmaker Yeshoda Prakash, he co-founded the production banners Swasthik Entertainment and Coorg Coffeewood Movies. Their Kannada film Kandeelu (2022) received the National Film Award for Best Kannada Feature Film. Prakash Kariappa received the National Award from the President of India at the 71st National Awards Ceremony held in New Delhi on 23 September 2025.

== Early life and military career ==
Prakash Kariappa was born in Kodagu district, Karnataka, to Kottukathira Elakki Kariappa and Ragini Kariappa. He completed his primary education in Gadinad Surlabbi, Kalur, and Galibeedu. During his primitive years, Prakash spent his time at his maternal home along with his maternal uncles, maternal aunts and his cousins with whom he carries strong bond.

He joined the Indian Army in June 1983 and served for 17 years in the Indian Army Service Corps (ASC) regiment]. During his service, he was posted in Jammu and Kashmir, Madhya Pradesh, Assam, Nagaland, and Rajasthan. He was part of the Indian Peace Keeping Force (IPKF) deployed in Sri Lanka against the LTTE and later served in the Kargil detachment during the 1999 conflict. Kariappa retired from the Army in June 2000 with an Exemplary Certificate for his long service. After retirement, he launched multiple businesses ranging from ventures in pre-casting and concrete products along with construction business.

== Career in arts and cinema ==
While serving in the Army, Kariappa actively participated in theatre and cultural activities. He met filmmaker Apadanda T. Raghu in 2016, who introduced Prakash to the world of acting and cast him in the Kodava-language television serials Gejje Thand, Jamma Bhumi, and Nanga Kodava.

In 2017, he founded Coorg Coffeewood Movies and produced his first Kodava film Baake Mane, which was screened at the Kolkata International Film Festival. Since then, he has acted in 19 films in Kodava and Kannada languages and produced or directed several films, many of which have been showcased at Indian and international film festivals.

== Literary work ==
Kariappa has authored 11 novels in Kodava and Kannada languages. Four of his works have been adapted into films, including Sattha Soothakada Suttha and the Kodava films Pommaale Kodag, Ber, and Kaangatha Mood. His novel Naada Kodag received the Kodava Sahithya Academy Award for Best Novel in 2024.

== Collaborations with Yeshoda Prakash ==
Kariappa's wife, Yeshoda Prakash (Thaamane: Mandeyanda), is also a filmmaker. Together, the couple has made 18 films in Kodava and Kannada, along with one Kodava documentary. They are the first Kodava couple to receive a National Film Award. Their films have been screened at international festivals including those in Kolkata, Bangalore, Goa, and Dhaka.

== Awards and recognition ==
- National Film Award for Best Kannada Feature Film (Kandeelu)
- Karnataka State Award for Best Regional Film (Film: Nada Peda Asha)
- Karnataka State Award for Best Director (Film: Nada Peda Asha)
- Karnataka State Film Award for Lyrics (Parjanya)
- Best Children's Film Awards for Ashraya Dama (2017) and Makkala Theerpu (2019)
- Multiple selections at film festivals including Kolkata International Film Festival, Bangalore International Film Festival, Dhaka International Film Festival, and Jagaran International Film Festival

== Personal life ==
Prakash Kariappa is married to filmmaker Yeshoda Prakash Kottukathira, with whom he frequently collaborates. Together, they are recognized as major contributors to both Kodava and Kannada cinema. The couple has 2 daughters - Thejal Kariappa and Thanam Kariappa.

== Bibliography ==
| No. | Title | Language | Publisher | Year | ISBN |
|---|---|---|---|---|---|
| 1 | Polanda Baal | Kodava | Kodava Makkada Koota | 2019 | |
| 2 | Premada Haadiyalli | Kannada | Kodava Makkada Koota | 2019 | |
| 3 | Nada Kodag | Kodava | Kodava Makkada Koota | 2020 | |
| 4 | Bicycle | Kannada | Kodava Makkada Koota | 2018 | |
| 5 | Sattha Soothakada Suttha | Kannada | Kodava Makkada Koota | 2021 | |
| 6 | Vidhira Kali | Kodava | Kodava Makkada Koota | 2021 | |
| 7 | Ber - The Root | Kodava | Kodava Makkada Koota | 2022 | |
| 8 | Veera Chakra | Kodava | Kodava Makkada Koota | 2023 | |
| 9 | Moha Pasha | Kannada | Kodava Makkada Koota | 2022 | |
| 10 | Gamya | Kannada | Kodava Makkada Koota | 2023 | |
| 11 | Karagida Baduku | Kannada | Kodava Makkada Koota | 2022 | |

== Filmography ==
| Year | Title | Genre | Language | Role | Banner | Award | Result | Notes |
|---|---|---|---|---|---|---|---|---|
| 2016 | Thamate Narasimhaiah | Feature Film | Kannada | Actor | | | | |
| 2017 | Ashraya Dama | Children Film | Kannada | Actor/Producer | Coorg Coffeewood Movies | GOK Best Children Movie | Won | |
| 2018 | Meshtru Devaru | Feature Film | Kannada | Actor/Producer | Coorg Coffeewood Movies | | | |
| 2019 | Kodagra Sipayi | Kodava Film | Kodava | Actor/Director/Producer | Coorg Coffeewood Movies | KIFF, BIFF | Nominated | |
| 2019 | Abdulla | Feature Film | Kannada | Producer | | | | |
| 2019 | Makkala Theerpu | Feature Film | Kannada | Actor/Director | Balaji Chitra | GOK Best Children Movie | Won | |
| 2020 | Parjanya | Feature Film | Kannada | Director/Producer | Coorg Coffeewood Movies | GOK State Award for Best Lyrics | Won | |
| 2020 | Deeksha | Feature Film | Kannada | Actor/Producer | Swashtik Entertainment | | | |
| 2021 | Naada Peda Asha | Kodava Film | Kodava | Actor/Director | VK3 Pictures/ Swasthik Entertainment | Karnataka State Award for Best Regional Movie & Best Director | Won | |
| 2022 | Satha Soothakada Sutha | Kannada Film | Kannada | Actor/Story/Producer | Maharushi Productions | KIFF Screening | Nominated | |
| 2022 | Pommaale Kodag | Kodava Film | Kodava | Director/Story/Producer | Swashtik Entertainment | KIFF | Nominated | |
| 2022 | Antharmukha | Kannada Film | Kannada | Producer | Coorg Coffeewood Movies | | | |
| 2022 | Rangapravesha | Kannada Film | Kannada | Co-Producer | Emerald Creations | | | |
| 2023 | Ber - The Root | Kodava Film | Kodava | Actor/Director/Story/Producer | Coorg Coffeewood Movies | BIFF, KIFF, Dasara Festival | Nominated | |
| 2023 | Kandeelu - The Ray of Hope | Feature Film | Kannada | Producer | Swashtik Entertainment | National Film Award, BIFF, KIFF, Dasara Festival | Won | |
| 2024 | Kangatha Mood | Kodava Film | Kodava | Actor/Director/Story/Producer | Coorg Coffeewood Movies | BIFF | Nominated | |
| 2024 | Koumudi | Feature Film | Kannada | Producer | Swashtik Entertainment | Jagaran India Film Festival | Nominated | |
| 2025 | Gule | Feature Film | Kannada | Director/Co-producer | Maharushi Productions | | | |
| 2025 | Ummathat | Documentary | Kodava | Director/Story/Producer | Swashtik Entertainment | 56th International Film Festival of India | Nominated | |
