= Crocodiles (film) =

2025 Mexican film

- Promotional release poster
- Directed by: J. Xavier Velasco
- Screenplay by: J. Xavier Velasco
- Story by: J. Xavier Velasco; Magali Velasco Vargas
- Produced by: Ernesto Martínez Arévalo; J. Xavier Velasco; Jessica Villegas Lattuada
- Cinematography: Felipe Perez-Burchard
- Edited by: J. Xavier Velasco
- Music by: Mike Sayre
- Release date: April 6, 2025 (Chicago Latino Film Festival)
- Countries: Mexico; United States

Crocodiles (Spanish: Cocodrilos) is a 2025 crime drama thriller film written, co-produced, edited and directed by J. Xavier Velasco. It is a joint production by Mexico and the United States. It had its U.S. and world premiere on April 6, 2025, at the 41st Chicago Latino Film Festival, and its Mexican premiere at the 40th Guadalajara International Film Festival in June 2025.

== Synopsis ==
Santiago, a young Mexican photojournalist in the state of Veracruz, undertakes a risky investigation after his journalist friend and mentor Amanda is murdered on the same day she has met with him. The storyline is not based on a single event, but on various real-life threats encountered by journalists in Mexico, many of whom have been murdered.

== Cast ==
- Hoze Meléndez as Santiago Ortiz
- Teresa Sánchez as Amanda González
- Arcelia Ramírez
- Karem Momo

== Production ==
The background to the narrative is based on real-life circumstances in Veracruz, where many journalists have been murdered by figures in organised crime. A 2024 Amnesty International report reported that least 141 journalists and other media workers had been killed in Mexico since 2000. While the storyline does not follow a specific real-life case, the murders of investigative journalist Regina Martínez in 2012 and photojournalist Rubén Espinosa in 2015 served as inspiration to the director, J. Xavier Velasco. He is from Xalapa, the capital of Veracruz, "a university city, full of culture, very peaceful". After President Felipe Calderón announced his "war on drugs", Velasco was shocked by the violence against citizens, and by seeing the military in the streets. One element in the film based on a true event was the discovery of a mass grave in Veracruz.

He called it "an homage to the journalists, these folks that risk their lives, who dedicate themselves to a job that can truly lead them to death". Velasco said in an interview that the same issue occurs in other parts of the world: in the Israel-Gaza war, at least 173 journalists and media workers were killed between October 2023 and April 2025, and in the United States, there are also attempts to silence nonprofit news outlets which try to report on facts. As preparation for the role, he gave lead actor Hoze Meléndez a book titled Romper el Silencio ("Breaking the Silence"), which comprises testimonies by living journalists who describe how risky it can be to investigate the violence and corruption in narcotic trafficking in Mexico.

The film is a joint Mexican-U.S. production, written, directed, edited, and co-produced by J. Xavier Velasco, in his debut feature film. It is co-produced by Jessica Villegas Lattuada and Ernesto Martinez Arévalo. Cinematography was by Felipe Pérez Burchard, and the score was composed by Mike Sayre. Velasco started to write the script in 2019, co-creating the plot with his novelist sister, Magali Velasco. Xavuer wrote the plot, and then he wrote the screenplay while Magali wrote a novel of the same title (Cocodrilos), published in 2025. The screenplay was selected for development at the 2021 Cine Qua Non Lab script workshop.

Its genre is crime drama and thriller. It was filmed in Vercruz.

As of 2025 Velasco is resident in New York City. Since 2011 he has made a number of short films, some of which have won or been nominated for awards.

== Release ==
Crocodiles had its world premiere on April 6, 2025, at the 41st Chicago Latino Film Festival. An additional screening followed on April 8 at the Landmark's Century Centre Cinema in Chicago, followed by a Q&A session with Velasco and Meléndez. It had its Mexican premiere screening in competition at the 40th Guadalajara International Film Festival in June.

Cocodrilos was then screened at various festivals in Mexico, at the New York Latino Film Festival in August 2025, and at the Adelaide Film Festival in Adelaide, Australia, in October 2025.

It is expected to be released on digital platforms in the first half of 2026.
