= Kandeelu – The Ray of Hope =

Indian film

- Official poster
- Directed by: Yeshoda Prakash
- Story by: Nagesh N
- Produced by: Prakash Kariappa; Yeshoda Prakash
- Starring: Prabhakar Kunder; Chandrakanth Kodpadi; Guru Tejas L Shetty; Venkatesh PK
- Cinematography: PVR Swamy
- Edited by: Nagesh N
- Music by: Srisuresh
- Production company: Swasthik Entertainment
- Release date: 2023
- Running time: 114 minutes
- Country: India
- Language: Kannada

Kandeelu – The Ray of Hope is a 2023 Indian Kannada-language drama film directed by Yeshoda Prakash Kottukathira and produced by Prakash Kariappa and Yeshoda Prakash, under their home banner Swasthik Entertainment. The film's story is written by Nagesh N and stars Prabhakar Kunder, featuring music composed by Srisuresh, with cinematography by PVR Swamy. The film narrates the story of a poor farmer, Seeba, and the journey of a family coping with loss, hope, and resilience amidst socio-political challenges. The movie also highlights the land mafia most farmers in the rural areas continue to face.

Kandeelu did not have a theatrical release but was screened at multiple film festivals across India, including Bengaluru International Film Festival (BIFFes), Kolkata International Film Festival (KIFF) where the movie received recognitions. At BIFFes, the movie stood second best amongst regional films at the 71st National Film Awards, announced in August 2025. Kandeelu was awarded Best Feature Film in Kannada

== Plot ==
Seeba, a poor farmer, dreams of owning a farm and a house for his family but struggles to make ends meet. He sends his son abroad with hope of fulfilling his dream, but is shattered when his son tragically dies abroad. Determined to perform his son's last rites and bring his mortal remains back home, Seeba, along with his wife and daughter, exhausts all possible options. And to his dismay, those he looked up to, turn a blind eye to his plight.

As the village festival draws near, Seeba, who is also entrusted with a specific ritual, grapples with conflicting emotions of duty and sorrow. The movie delves into socio-political issues faced by the vulnerable, the internal conflict between the heart and mind, and the redemptive power of nature's love.

Seeba's poignant story reflects the struggles of the less privileged, the anguish of losing a loved one, and the challenges of navigating a socio-political landscape that often neglects the marginalized. Through Seeba's journey, the film sheds light on the resilience of the human spirit and the solace that nature can provide in times of adversity.

== Cast ==
- Prabhakar Kunder as Seeba
- Vanitha Rajesh
- Guru Tejas L Shetty
- Chandrakanth Kodpadi
- Venkatesh P. K.
- Baby Eeramanda Kushi Kaveramma
- Rohini
- Rathnakumari

== Production ==
Kandeelu was directed by Yeshoda Prakash Kottukathira, who had previously directed the Kannada film Ranga Pravesha, which starred Summan Nagarkar. The film was produced under her home banner, Swasthik Entertainment, which she owns along with her husband Prakash Kariappa Kottukathira. which he owns along with his wife Yeshoda. The film was shot at locations in rural Karnataka.

== Screening ==
Kandeelu – The Ray of Hope was completed in 2023 and the trailer was released via YouTube on 2 May 2023. The movie was screened at various regional film festivals like Kolkata International Film Festival and Bengaluru International Film Festival prior to receiving national recognition. As it was not intended for commercial release, the film’s distribution details are yet to be confirmed by the producers

== Accolades ==
Year	Award	Category	Recipient(s)	Result	Ref.
2025	71st National Film Awards	Best Feature Film in Kannada	Yeshoda Prakash Kottukathira & Swasthik Entertainment	Won	
2024			Yeshoda Prakash Kottukathira & Swasthik Entertainment		
2024	Bengaluru International Film Festival	Kannada Cinema	Yeshoda Prakash Kottukathira & Swasthik Entertainment	Won	
2023	Kolkata International Film Festival	Competition on Indian Language's Films	Yeshoda Prakash Kottukathira & Swasthik Entertainment	Nominated	
