= On the Road (2025 Mexican film) =

- Promotional teaser poster
- Spanish: En el camino
- Directed by: David Pablos
- Written by: David Pablos
- Produced by: Diego Luna; Enrique Nava; Inna Payán; Luis Salinas
- Starring: Victor Prieto; Osvaldo Sanchez
- Cinematography: Ximena Amann
- Edited by: Paulina Del Paso; Jonathan Pellicer
- Music by: Andrea Balency-Béarn
- Production companies: Animal de Luz Films; La Corriente del Golfo; The Maestros Cine; EFD Studios; Producciones Año Bisiesto
- Release dates: 4 September 2025 (Venice); 4 June 2026 (Mexico)
- Running time: 93 minutes
- Country: Mexico
- Language: Spanish

On the Road (Spanish: En el camino) is a 2025 Mexican romantic-thriller film written and directed by David Pablos. It follows Veneno (Victor Prieto) a gay young man who falls for Muñeco (Osvaldo Sanchez), a womanizer truck driver.

The film had its world premiere in the Orizzonti section of the 82nd Venice International Film Festival on 4 September 2025, where it won the section's main prize and the Queer Lion. It was theatrically released in Mexico on 4 June 2026.

It was also selected as the Mexican entry for Best International Feature Film at the 99th Academy Awards.

== Plot ==
Veneno is a young hustler who trades sexual favors to gay men for money at a roadside diner. One day he meets Muñeco, an older truck driver passing through the area, and joins Muñeco on his journey, with the two men falling in love as they are pursued by figures from Veneno's past.

== Cast ==
- Victor Prieto as Veneno
- Osvaldo Sanchez as Muñeco
- Mariano López Sosa

== Release ==
The film had its world premiere in the Orizzonti section of the 82nd Venice International Film Festival on 4 September 2025, where it won the section's main prize and the Queer Lion.

It was theatrically released in Mexico on 4 June 2026.

It was acquired for commercial distribution in Italy by I Wonder Pictures.

== Reception ==
=== Critical response ===
Jordan Mintzer of The Hollywood Reporter wrote that "What’s most impressive is how On the Road turns a boilerplate genre scenario — and one that doesn’t skimp on a bloodbath at the end — into a movie that grows increasingly emotional as things get exponentially worse for its main characters. The more Veneno and Muñeco are in danger, the more their bond evolves from a hard-knocks bromance into an all-out romance. When things are at their most desperate, the two hide out in an abandoned warehouse and slow-dance to the Colombian ballad "Los Caminos de la Vida" in one of the most moving sequences seen this year in Venice."

For the International Cinephile Society, Matthew Joseph Jenner wrote that "En el camino is yet another compelling entry into this ongoing era of challenging, provocative queer films that set out to redefine certain perceptions around identity and how it manifests both on screen and in the surrounding discussions. The film blurs sensuality with the looming thread of danger, which is something that the director does not neglect, especially in the portions where it seems like he is commenting critically on themes much deeper than we’d expect from a cursory glance. It may contain a lot of passion, but it’s far from a romance, particularly in how it shows that queerness can come with an inherent risk in some communities, something that Pablos makes sure to emphasise without making the film a heavy-handed cautionary tale."

=== Accolades ===
Year	Award	Category	Nominee(s)	Result	Ref.
2026	68th Ariel Awards	Best Picture		Won	
2026	68th Ariel Awards	Best Director	David Pablos	Won	
2026	68th Ariel Awards	Best Original Screenplay	David Pablos	Nominated	
2026	68th Ariel Awards	Best Actor	Osvaldo Sánchez	Won	
2026	68th Ariel Awards	Best Supporting Actor	Mariano López Sosa	Won	
2026	68th Ariel Awards	Best Breakthrough Performance	Víctor Miguel Prieto Simental	Won	
2026	68th Ariel Awards	Best Cinematography	Ximena Amann	Won	
2026	68th Ariel Awards	Best Original Score	Andrea Balency-Béarn	Nominated	
2026	68th Ariel Awards	Best Editing	Jonathan Pellicer	Nominated	
2026	68th Ariel Awards	Best Art Direction	Belén Estrada	Nominated	
2026	68th Ariel Awards	Best Costume Design	Felipe Criado	Nominated	
2026	68th Ariel Awards	Best Makeup	Adam Zoller	Nominated	
2026	68th Ariel Awards	Best Visual Effects	Jorge Palma Bermúdez	Nominated	

== See also ==
- List of Mexican submissions for the Academy Award for Best International Feature Film
- List of submissions to the 99th Academy Awards for Best International Feature Film
