= 41st Goya Awards =

Spanish film awards

- Date: 6 February 2027
- Site: Navarra Arena, Pamplona, Spain
- Organized by: Academy of Cinematographic Arts and Sciences of Spain

The 41st Goya Awards ceremony, presented by the Academy of Cinematographic Arts and Sciences of Spain, will place at the Navarra Arena in Pamplona, Navarre, on 6 February 2027.

== Background ==
In June 2026, the Academy approved the regulations for the 2027 awards. A key feature was the modification of the eligibility criteria for the Goya Award for Best New Actor and the Goya Award for Best New Actress, ruling that candidates must not have appeared in more than four feature films released in theaters previously, nor may they have been working professionally in film acting for more than 10 years. The maximum number of submissions per country in the Best European Film category was reduced to one. Further restrictions were introduced vis-à-vis the use of artificial intelligence, including the requirement of an affidavit on the use of generative AI at any development stage of the candidate films. In September 2026, Academy president Fernando Méndez-Leite announced Pamplona as the host city together with the Navarrese regional president María Chivite.

On 7 October 2026, the Spanish Film Academy presented the 19 submissions (up from 15 in 2026) for the Goya Award for Best Ibero-American Film:

Bajo el mismo sol (Dominican Republic), Chichero (Panama), Cordillera de Fuego (Guatemala), El pez que fuma (Venezuela), Esta isla (Puerto Rico), The Red Hangar (Chile), The Ivy (Ecuador), The Condor Daughter (Bolivia), The Virgin of the Quarry Lake (Argentina), Rains Over Babel (Colombia), Fireflies at El Mozote (El Salvador), Maria Vitória (Portugal), Flies (Mexico), Narciso (Paraguay), Neurótica anónima (Cuba), Forever Your Maternal Animal (Costa Rica), A Loose End (Uruguay), On Behalf of My Son (Brazil), and Night Has Come (Peru).

On 21 October 2026, the academy presented the 19 submissions for the Goya Award for Best European Film:

All of a Sudden (France), Child (Luxembourg), Coward (Belgium), Fatherland (Poland), Fjord (Romania), Flood (Slovakia), Fuglar og menn (Iceland), Yellow Letters (Germany), God Will Not Help (Croatia), Hamnet (United Kingdom), If Pigeons Turned to Gold (Czech Republic), The Currents (Switzerland), LifeLike (Turkey), Patty Is Such a Girly Name (Greece), Primavera (Italy), Rose (Austria), Terra Vil (Portugal), Ulya (Latvia), and Zafzifa (Malta).

The nominations will be read on 15 December 2026.

== Categories ==
Best Film	Best Director
Best Actor	Best Actress
Best Supporting Actor	Best Supporting Actress
Best New Actor	Best New Actress
Best Original Screenplay	Best Adapted Screenplay
Best Ibero-American Film	Best European Film
Best New Director	Best Animated Film
Best Cinematography	Best Editing
Best Art Direction	Best Production Supervision
Best Sound	Best Special Effects
Best Costume Design	Best Makeup and Hairstyles
Best Original Score	Best Original Song
Best Fictional Short Film	Best Animated Short Film
Best Documentary Film	Best Documentary Short Film
