= The Blue Trail =

2025 Brazilian film

- Theatrical release poster
- Portuguese: O Último Azul
- Directed by: Gabriel Mascaro
- Written by: Tibério Azul; Gabriel Mascaro
- Produced by: Rachel Daisy Ellis; Sandino Saravia Vinay
- Starring: Denise Weinberg; Rodrigo Santoro
- Cinematography: Guillermo Garza
- Edited by: Sebastián Sepúlveda; Omar Guzmán
- Music by: Memo Guerra
- Production companies: Desvia Filmes; Cinevinay; Viking Film; Quijote Cine
- Distributed by: Vitrine Filmes; Cinemart
- Release dates: 16 February 2025 (Berlinale); 28 August 2025 (Brazil)
- Running time: 86 minutes
- Countries: Brazil; Mexico; Chile; Netherlands
- Language: Portuguese
- Box office: $774,141

The Blue Trail (Portuguese: O Último Azul) is a 2025 dystopian drama film directed by Gabriel Mascaro. Starring Denise Weinberg and Rodrigo Santoro, the film follows the 77-year-old Tereza, forced to retire from her job and placed under the guardianship of her daughter, who defies a government order for relocation imposed on its growing elderly population, embarking instead on a personal journey through the Amazon.

It had its world premiere at the main competition of the 75th Berlin International Film Festival, on 16 February 2025, where it won the Silver Bear Grand Jury Prize. It was theatrically released in Brazil by Vitrine Filmes on 28 August.

== Synopsis ==
In an effort to boost the economy, the government creates distant colonies for the elderly, ensuring them a comfortable end to their lives. Teresa, a 77-year-old, finds herself unexpectedly included in the program due to a lowered age threshold. With only days left before her relocation, she decides to defy her fate and embarks on a journey through the Amazon to fulfill one last wish: to take her first airplane ride. Because permission is refused, she secretly embarks on a boat trip as an illicit passenger and has numerous encounters along the way. Despite setbacks and near failures to her plans, she is able to use her life's savings to find happiness.

== Cast ==
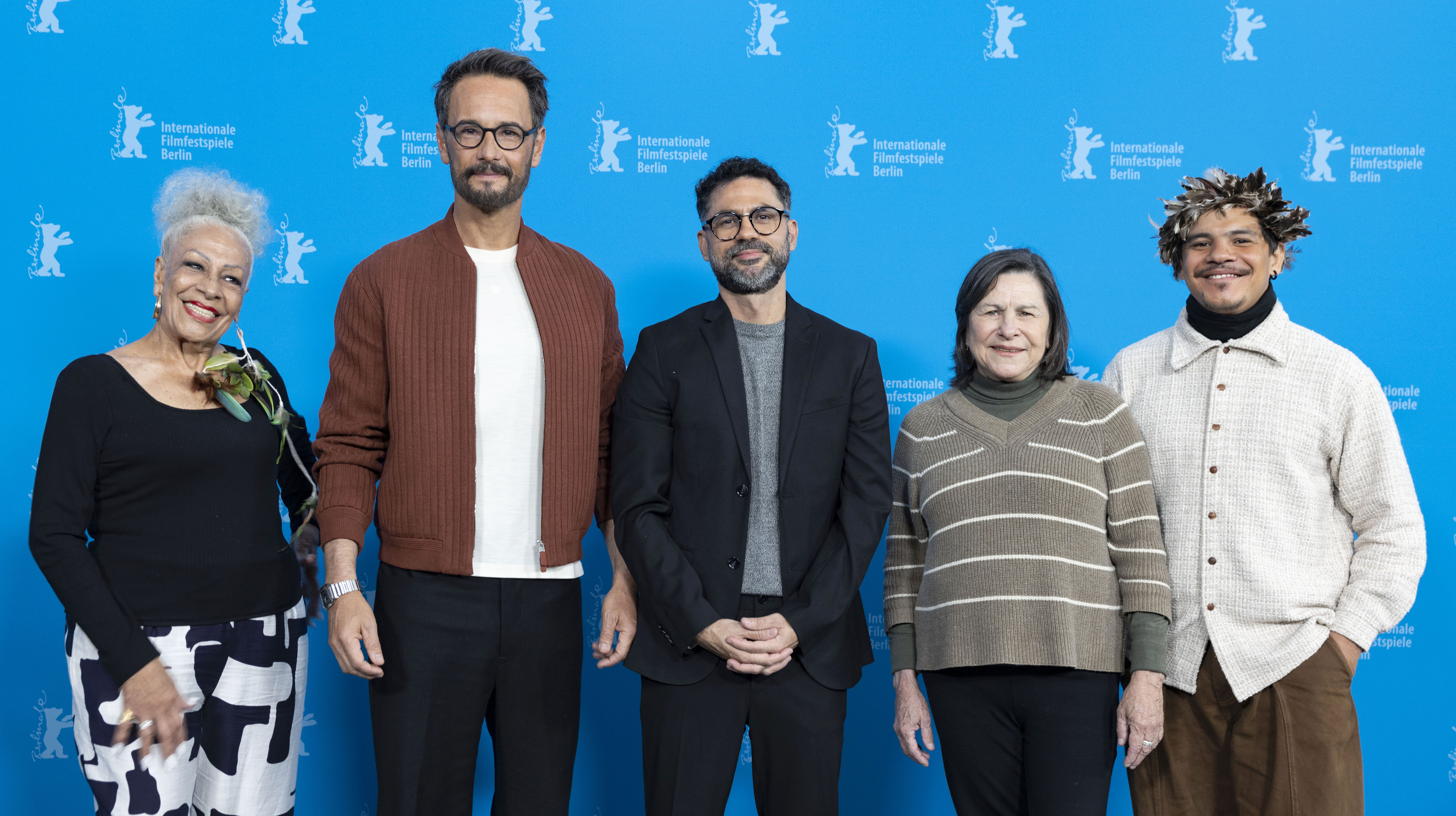
The cast and the director of the film at the Berlinale, (from L to R) Miriam Socorrás, Rodrigo Santoro, Gabriel Mascaro, Denise Weinberg and Adanilo

- Denise Weinberg as Tereza
- Rodrigo Santoro as Cadu
- Miriam Socorrás as Roberta
- Adanilo as Ludemir

== Release ==
Lucky Number, a new Paris-based sales company, acquired sales rights for the film in January 2025 as part of its inaugural roster.

The Blue Trail had its world premiere on 16 February 2025, as part of the 75th Berlin International Film Festival, in competition.

The film was screened in Les Auteurs at the 49th Hong Kong International Film Festival on 18 April 2025, and in Sydney, Australia at the 72nd Sydney Film Festival The film was also part of Horizons section of the 59th Karlovy Vary International Film Festival, where it was screened from 4 July to 9 July 2025. The Blue Trail competed in the Latin American Fiction at the 29th Lima Film Festival for Trophy Spondylus in August 2025.

The film was screened in the Centrepiece section of the 2025 Toronto International Film Festival on 10 September 2025. It was also screened as part of World Cinema at the 2025 Atlantic International Film Festival on September 14, 2025. It was also presented in the World Cinema section at the 30th Busan International Film Festival on 18 September 2025.

On 2 October 2025, it was showcased in the Showcase section of 2025 Vancouver International Film Festival. Later it competed in the 'Official Section' of the 70th Valladolid International Film Festival for Golden Spike. and screened in the International Panorama for its Quebec Premiere at the 2025 Festival du nouveau cinéma on October 13, 2025. On 28 October 2025, the film was showcased at the 38th Tokyo International Film Festival in 'World Focus' section. It was screened in Special Screenings at the Thessaloniki International Film Festival on 6 November 2025, and in Open Zone section of the 2025 Stockholm International Film Festival on 7 November 2025. It was presented in the 'Screen International Critics' Choice' at the 29th Tallinn Black Nights Film Festival on 7 November 2025. It competed in the Main Program Together Again at the Zagreb Film Festival for Golden Pram Award on 13 November 2025. Seven days later on 20 November, it will open 56th International Film Festival of India.

It was screened in the World Cinema Now section of the 37th Palm Springs International Film Festival on 4 January 2026.

The film was also shortlisted along with other five films as the Brazil‘s Oscar submission for 98th Academy Awards, but was not selected as the country's official submission.

It was theatrically released in Brazil on 28 August 2025 by Vitrine Filmes.

== Reception ==
=== Box office ===
Released on 28 August 2025, the film had 190,000 admissions during its run at the Brazilian box office.

=== Critical response ===
On the review aggregator website Rotten Tomatoes, 98% of 54 critics' reviews are positive. The website's consensus reads: "Finding dignity and fresh beginnings in old age, The Blue Trail is a scrappy adventure that elevates its modest production value with ample doses of imagination." On Metacritic, the film has a weighted average score of 78 out of 100 based on 16 critics, which the site labels as "generally favorable" reviews.

Peter Debruge reviewing at Berlin Film Festival, for Variety wrote, "[Gabriel Mascaro] has always had an incredible visual sense, though his plots tend to lack focus. Not this one." Debruge ended his review with a poetic touch, saying that although Tereza's journey is only 86 minutes long, it’s packed with unforgettable scenes—like a huge pile of tires returned to the forest, a strange graveyard of theme park pieces, and a small boat gliding through a winding river, almost like it’s flying.

== Accolades ==
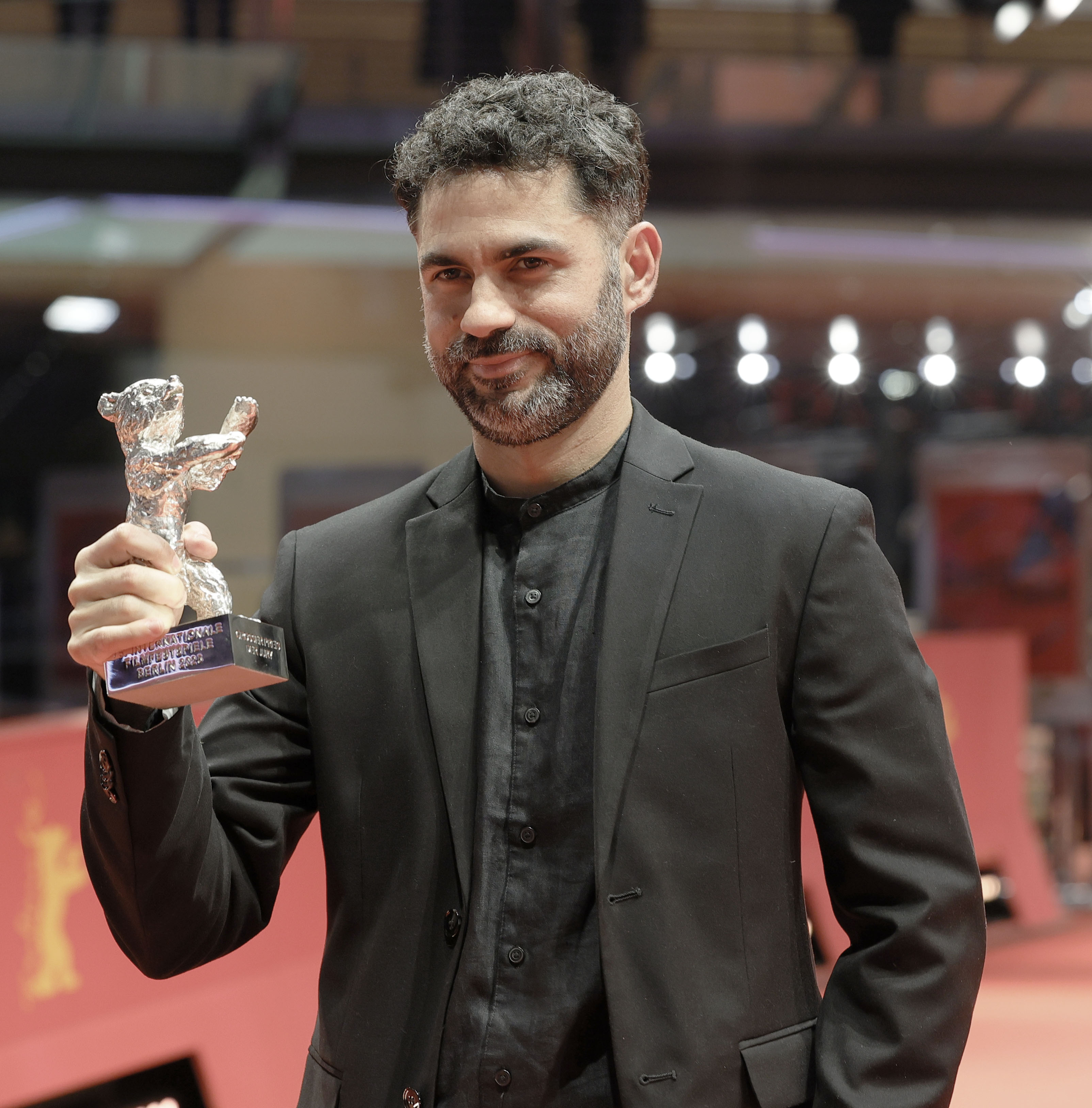
Gabriel Mascaro, Winner of Silver Bear of Berlinale 2025

Award	Date of ceremony	Category	Recipient	Result	Ref.
Berlin International Film Festival	23 February 2025	Golden Bear	The Blue Trail	Nominated	
Berlin International Film Festival	23 February 2025	Silver Bear Grand Jury Prize	The Blue Trail	Won	
Berlin International Film Festival	23 February 2025	Prize of the Ecumenical Jury	The Blue Trail	Won	
Berlin International Film Festival	23 February 2025	Berliner Morgenpost Readers' Jury Award	The Blue Trail	Won	
Guadalajara International Film Festival	14 June 2025	Best Ibero-American Fiction Film	The Blue Trail	Won	
Lima Film Festival	16 September 2025	Trophy Spondylus	The Blue Trail	Nominated	
Valladolid International Film Festival	1 November 2025	Golden Spike	The Blue Trail	Nominated	
Valladolid International Film Festival	1 November 2025	Young Jury Award Official Section	The Blue Trail	Won	
Ariel Awards	3 October 2026	Best Picture	The Blue Trail	Pending	
Ariel Awards	3 October 2026	Best Director	Gabriel Mascaro	Pending	
Ariel Awards	3 October 2026	Best Original Screenplay	Gabriel Mascaro, Tibério Azul	Pending	
Ariel Awards	3 October 2026	Best Cinematography	Guillermo Garza	Pending	
Ariel Awards	3 October 2026	Best Editing	Omar Guzmán, Sebastián Sepúlveda	Pending	
Ariel Awards	3 October 2026	Best Original Score	Memo Guerra	Pending	
Ariel Awards	3 October 2026	Best Sound	Arturo Salazar, Liliana Villaseñor, María Alejandra Rojas, Vincent Sinceretti	Pending	
