= In Search of the Sky =

Indian drama film

- Festival release poster
- Braj: Vimukt
- Directed by: Jitank Singh Gurjar
- Screenplay by: Pooja Vishal Sharma; Jitank Singh Gurjar
- Produced by: Pooja Vishal Sharma; Madhhu Shharma; Arpan Raut; Akarshi Jaiswal; Navin Shetty
- Starring: Nikhil Yadav; Raghvendra Bhadoriya; Meghna Agarwal
- Cinematography: Shelly Sharma
- Edited by: Pavan Therukar
- Music by: Manish Kumar
- Production company: Canvas Creation
- Release date: 6 September 2025 (TIFF)
- Running time: 90 minutes
- Country: India

In Search of the Sky (Braj: Vimukt) is an Indian drama film, directed by Jitank Singh Gurjar and released in 2025.

An exploration of the attitudes and challenges that face people with disabilities in rural India, the film stars Raghvendra Bhadoriya and Meghna Agarwal as Jasrath and Vidya, a couple struggling with the financial and social challenges of caring for their developmentally disabled son Naran (Nikhil Yadav), who undertake a religious pilgrimage to the Maha Kumbh in hopes of finding a solution.

== Production ==
Gurjar's directorial debut, the film was shot in Madhya Pradesh, principally in the city of Prayagraj and smaller towns.

According to producer and screenwriter Pooja Vishal Sharma, the film was inspired in part by her prior work with an organization for children with developmental disabilities.

== Distribution ==
The film premiered at the 2025 Toronto International Film Festival, where it won the NETPAC Prize.

It will compete for IFFI ICFT UNESCO Gandhi Medal at the 56th International Film Festival of India in November 2025.
