= Rains Over Babel =

2025 Colombian drama film

- Colombian promotional poster
- Spanish: Llueve sobre Babel
- Directed by: Gala del Sol
- Written by: Gala del Sol
- Based on: Inferno by Dante Alighieri
- Produced by: Felipe Aguilar Rodríguez; Celina Biurrun; Gala del Sol; Ana Cristina Gutierrez; Andres Felipe Hermida; Natalia Rendón; José Varón
- Starring: Santiago Pineda; Celina Biurrun; Roman Escobar; Johan Zapata; Saray Rebolledo
- Cinematography: Sten Olson
- Edited by: Gala del Sol; Hadley Hillel
- Music by: Martin De Lima
- Production companies: Gala del Sol Films; Fabrica Mundi
- Release dates: 26 January 2025 (Sundance); 16 April 2026 (Colombia)
- Running time: 113 minutes
- Countries: Colombia; Spain; United States
- Language: Spanish

Rains Over Babel (Spanish: Llueve sobre Babel) is a 2025 black comedy fantasy film written, produced, co-edited and directed by Gala del Sol, and inspired by Dante's Inferno. A co-production of Colombia, Spain and the United States, it centres on Babel, a nightclub in Cali, Colombia, which is a liminal purgatory between life and death.

The film had its world premiere in the Next section of the 2025 Sundance Film Festival on 26 January. It was theatrically released in Colombia on 16 April 2026. It was selected as the Colombian entry for the Best International Feature Film at the 99th Academy Awards, and the 2027 entry for the 41st Goya Awards..

== Cast ==
The film stars Saray Rebolledo as La Flaca, death personified, with whom patrons must bargain for their lives; Felipe Aguilar Rodriguez as Dante, La Flaca's assistant grim reaper; William Hurtado as Jacob, the son of an pastor facing the ultimate test as he prepares for his debut drag queen performance; Johan Zapata as Monet, a ghost desperate to return to his body before it decomposes; Jose Mojica as Timbí, who travels through the circles of hell accompanied by a gypsy named Uma, played by Celina Biurrun, who is determined to settle a bet with La Flaca to save her dying daughter's life.

Santiago Pineda stars as El Boticaro, a bartender devil, and Sofia Buenaventura plays Erato, a mute guardian angel and Boticario's wife, and they both act as the omniscient narrators of the story.

Supporting cast members include Jhon Bayron Quintero Valencia as Darla Experiment, another drag performer; Jhon Narvaez as Don Alfonso, Jacob's father; Roman Escobar as drag artist Roma, John Alex Castillo as Gian Salai, the club owner; and Jacobo Vélez as El Callegüeso, the singer of a mythical orchestra called La Mambanegra, booked to perform at the club.

- Saray Rebolledo as La Flaca
- Santiago Pineda as El Boticaro
- Felipe Aguilar Rodriguez as Dante, La Flaca's assistant
- William Hurtado as Jacob
- Celina Biurrun as Uma
- Roman Escobar as Roma
- Johan Zapata as Monet
- Jose Mojica as Timbí
- Jhon Narvaez as Don Alfonso
- Sofia Buenaventura as Erato

== Release ==
The film premiered at the 2025 Sundance Film Festival on 26 January 2025. Subsequently It made to the 'Bright Future' strand of the 54th International Film Festival Rotterdam for its International premiere on 4 February 2025.

HBO Max purchased it for eastern Europe, and the platform FILMIN for Spain.

The film had its Colombian premiere 16 April 2026, and managed to run for 9 weeks in the commercial theater chain Cinecolombia, becoming the most watched Colombian film of 2026.

== Reception ==
=== Critical response ===
On the review aggregator Rotten Tomatoes website, the film has an approval rating of 92% based on 13 reviews, with an average rating of 7.1/10.

In June 2025, The Hollywood Reporter included Rains Over Babel as one of the "top 10 Hispanic Films of 2025". In July 2025, Del Sol was named by Variety as one of the "10 Colombian filmmakers to watch".

=== Accolades ===
The film won the Panorama España Grand Jury Award at Las Palmas de Gran Canaria International Film Festival in April 2025. It went on to win the Jury Award for Best First Feature at the Inside Out Film and Video Festival in Canada, May 2025.

On June 29, 2025, it won Best International Feature at the Pride Awards held at the Lincoln Center in New York City. The award was handed by TV personality and queer icon, Dominique Jackson.

Rains Over Babel was selected by the Colombian Academy of Cinematographic Arts and Sciences as their 2027 entry for the 41st Goya Awards as well as their entry for the Best International Feature Film at the 99th Academy Awards

== See also ==
- List of submissions to the 99th Academy Awards for Best International Feature Film
- List of Colombian submissions for the Academy Award for Best International Feature Film
