= The Shadow of Catire =

- Directed by: Jorge Hernandez Aldana
- Written by: Jorge Hernandez Aldana
- Produced by: Rodolfo Cova
- Starring: Francisco Denis
- Production company: paloma Flms
- Release date: 2017
- Countries: Venezuela; Mexico
- Language: Spanish

The Shadow of Catire is a Venezuelan-Mexican drama film directed by Jorge Hernandez Aldana and m features Francisco Denis, Giovanni Garcia, Tatiana Maibo, Jerico Montilla, Vicente peña' and Jorge Dakar. Its produced by Paloma Negra Films in association with Program ibermedia and Efecine Productions. The history is about an old bandit who have to fight for his lands in a corruption environment.

The international premiere of the film was Warsaw international film festival when won all the prize in competition. The premier in Mexico was in the Morelia international film festival.

== Plot ==
In a forget land and ruled by corrupt military force, the old bandit Benigno Cruz aka El catire decide move for search peace in the Autumn of his life. The potential client of his land its Coronel Perdomo, who is decide to take by a little amount of the real value. Soon Catire discover to sale the land need the authorization of his sons, witch abandoned in the past decades.

== Principal Cast ==
- Francisco Dennis as Beningno Cruz aka El Catir
- Giovanni Garcia as Perucho
- Tatiana Mabo as Mabel
- Jerico Montilla as Norma
- Vicente peña as Perdomo

== Production ==
According to the page of the CONAC the pre production of thee film start in 2017 with the title of Benigno Cruz.

The film was shooting between 2019 and 2021 in t the Lara state (Venezuela) specifically in the population Baragua y Pavia. The Covid 19 outage interrupted thee production of the film and this continue one year later.

== Music ==
The Main composers are Alain Gomez and Luis Daniel Gonzalez.
