= A Poet (film) =

2025 drama film

- Colombian theatrical release poster
- Spanish: Un poeta
- Directed by: Simón Mesa Soto
- Written by: Simón Mesa Soto
- Produced by: Simón Mesa Soto; Juan Sarmiento G.; Manuel Ruiz Montealegre
- Starring: Ubeimar Rios; Rebeca Andrade; Guillermo Cardona; Allison Correa; Margarita Soto; Humberto Restrepo
- Cinematography: Juan Sarmiento G.
- Edited by: Ricardo Saravia
- Music by: Matti Bye; Trio Ramberget
- Production companies: Ocúltimo; Medio de Contención Producciones; ma.ja.de Filmproduktions-GmbH; ZDF; Arte; Momento Film; Film i Väst
- Distributed by: OTH (Colombia)
- Release dates: 19 May 2025 (Cannes); 28 August 2025 (Colombia)
- Running time: 124 minutes
- Countries: Colombia; Germany; Sweden
- Language: Spanish
- Box office: $2 million

A Poet (Spanish: Un poeta) is a 2025 tragicomedy film written, co-produced and directed by Simón Mesa Soto. An international co-production between Colombia, Germany and Sweden, the film stars Ubeimar Rios, Rebeca Andrade, Guillermo Cardona, Allison Correa, Margarita Soto and Humberto Restrepo.

The film had its world premiere in the Un Certain Regard section of the 2025 Cannes Film Festival on 19 May 2025, where it won the section's Jury Prize. It was theatrically released in Colombia on 28 August 2025 by OTH. It was selected as the Colombian entry for the Best International Feature Film at the 98th Academy Awards, but it was not nominated.

== Premise ==
Oscar Restrepo's obsession with poetry has brought him no glory. Aging and erratic, he has become the cliche of the poet in the shadows. When he meets Yurlady, a teenage girl, he helps cultivate her talent.

== Cast ==
- Ubeimar Rios as Oscar Restrepo
- Rebeca Andrade as Yurlady
- Guillermo Cardona as Efrain
- Alisson Correa as Daniela
- Margarita Soto as Teresita
- Humberto Restrepo as Alonso

== Production ==
Principal photography took place in Medellín.

== Release ==
It had its world premiere at the 2025 Cannes Film Festival on 19 May 2025 in the Un Certain Regard section. Shortly after, 1-2 Special acquired US distribution rights to the film. It will also screen at the 2025 Toronto International Film Festival on 9 September 2025.

It competed in the International competition section of the 56th International Film Festival of India in November 2025.

The film was theatrically released on 28 August 2025 in Colombia.

== Reception ==
On the review aggregator website Rotten Tomatoes, 100% of 56 critics' reviews are positive, with an average rating of 8.0/10. The website's consensus reads: "Anchored by writer-director Simón Mesa Soto's wry detail and Ubeimar Rios' brilliantly uneasy performance, A Poet uses the tortured artist archetype to craft a story that's as darkly funny as it is unexpectedly affecting." On Metacritic, which uses a weighted average, the film holds a score of 85 out of 100 based on 13 critics, indicating "universal acclaim".

David Friend of The Canadian Press called the film "a bristlingly funny takedown of art circles."

=== Accolades ===
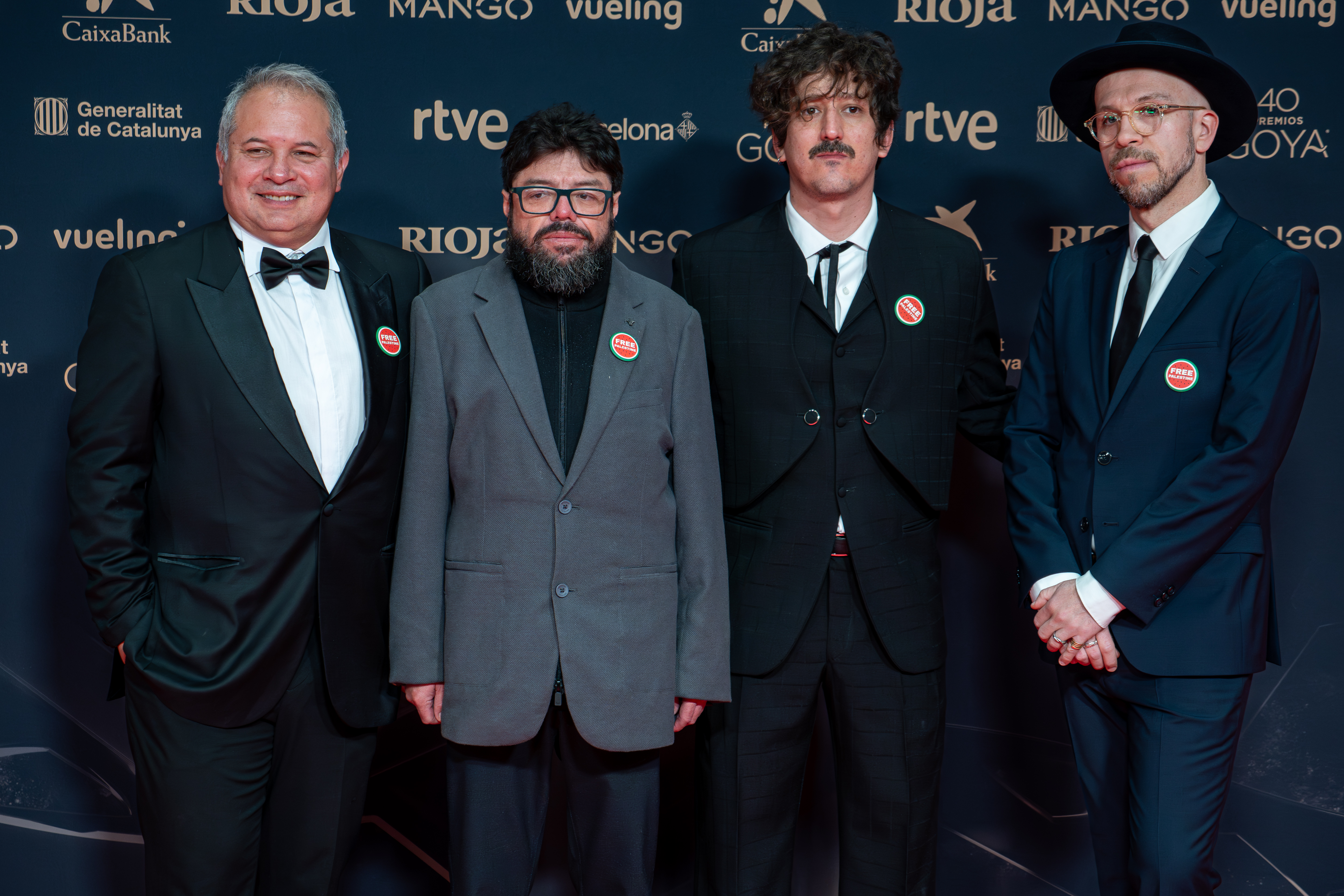
A Poet team attending the 40th Goya Awards in February 2026

Award	Ceremony date	Category	Recipient(s)	Result	Ref.
Film Independent Spirit Awards	15 February 2026	Best International Film	Simón Mesa Soto	Nominated	
Goya Awards	28 February 2026	Best Ibero-American Film	A Poet	Nominated	
Ariel Awards	3 October 2026	Best Ibero-American Film	A Poet	Won	

== Remake ==
In May 2026, an American remake was reported to be in development, with Nathan Silver directing and co-writing with C. Mason Wells.

== See also ==
- List of submissions to the 98th Academy Awards for Best International Feature Film
- List of Colombian submissions for the Academy Award for Best International Feature Film
