= The Devil Smokes (and Saves the Burnt Matches in the Same Box) =

- Theatrical release poster
- Spanish: El diablo fuma (y guarda las cabezas de los cerillos quemados en la misma caja)
- Directed by: Ernesto Martínez Bucio
- Screenplay by: Karen Plata; Ernesto Martínez Bucio
- Produced by: Alejandro Duran; Gabriela Gavica; Carlos Hernandez Vazquez
- Starring: Carmen Ramos; Donovan Said; Mariapau Bravo Avina; Rafael Nieto Martínez; Regina Alejandra; Laura Uribe Rojas; Gamboa Bernardo; Micaela Gramajo
- Cinematography: Odei Zabaleta
- Edited by: Ernesto Martínez Bucio; Karen Plata; Odei Zabaleta
- Music by: Emilio Hinojosa
- Production company: Mandarina Cine
- Release dates: February 15, 2025 (Berlinale); April 23, 2026 (Mexico)
- Running time: 97 minutes
- Country: Mexico
- Language: Spanish

The Devil Smokes (and Saves the Burnt Matches in the Same Box) (Spanish: El diablo fuma (y guarda las cabezas de los cerillos quemados en la misma caja)) is a 2025 Mexican drama film co-written and directed by Ernesto Martínez Bucio.

The film centres on five siblings — Vanessa (Laura Uribe Rojas), Victor (Donovan Said), Elsa (Mariapau Bravo Avina), Marisol (Regina Alejandra) and Tomas (Rafael Nieto Martinez) — who are abandoned by their parents Judith (Micaela Gramajo) and Emiliano (Bernardo Gamboa), and must find ways to survive while in the care of their paranoid schizophrenic grandmother Romana (Carmen Ramos).

The film premiered in February 2025 at the 75th Berlin International Film Festival. The film is scheduled to be released commercially on 23 April 2026, in Mexican theaters.

== Critical response ==
Jonathan Holland of Screen Daily wrote that "the formal experimentation of The Devil Smokes, is sometimes effective, sometimes not. It delivers most strongly in the oppressive atmospherics as Odei Zabaleta’s busy camera roams around the cluttered interiors of this shadowy house, taking us on a journey into a claustrophobic, dark little world from which we emerge, blinking and slightly traumatized, at the end."

For Variety, Guy Lodge wrote that "the singed sepia tones favored by Martínez Bucio and Zabaleta may recall sun-faded or ill-developed images from a family album, to the extent that some shots appear edged with film burn, but the effect isn’t one of warm nostalgia. Instead, there’s a vague end-of-days feel to the film’s parched, shadowy visuals, as Zabaleta’s prowling camera renders the layout of the home smaller with each passing minute. In so many such stories of children in crisis, the hovering presence of social services is presented as a threat; here, the authorities may well be letting the light in."

== Awards ==
Award	Date of ceremony	Category	Recipient(s)	Result	Ref.
Berlin International Film Festival	23 February 2025	GWFF Best First Feature Award	Ernesto Martínez Bucio	Won	
Hong Kong International Film Festival	21 April 2025	Best Director, Young Cinema Competition	Ernesto Martínez Bucio	Won	
New Horizons Film Festival	27 July 2025	Audience Award	Ernesto Martínez Bucio	Won	
Festival du nouveau cinéma	8 October 2025	FIPRESCI Award for Best First Feature Film	Ernesto Martínez Bucio	Won	
Morelia International Film Festival	19 October 2025	Best Screenplay	Karen Plata	Won	
Ariel Awards	3 October 2026	Best Picture	The Devil Smokes (and Saves the Burnt Matches in the Same Box)	Pending	
Ariel Awards	3 October 2026	Best First Work	The Devil Smokes (and Saves the Burnt Matches in the Same Box)	Pending	
Ariel Awards	3 October 2026	Best Director	Ernesto Martínez Bucio	Pending	
Ariel Awards	3 October 2026	Best Supporting Actor	Bernardo Gamboa	Pending	
Ariel Awards	3 October 2026	Best Breakthrough Performance	Donovan Said	Pending	
Ariel Awards	3 October 2026	Best Breakthrough Performance	Laura Uribe Rojas	Pending	
Ariel Awards	3 October 2026	Best Original Screenplay	Ernesto Martínez Bucio, Karen Plata	Pending	
Ariel Awards	3 October 2026	Best Editing	Ernesto Martínez Bucio, Karen Plata, Odei Zabaleta	Pending	
