= Gala del Sol =

Spanish-Colombian filmmaker

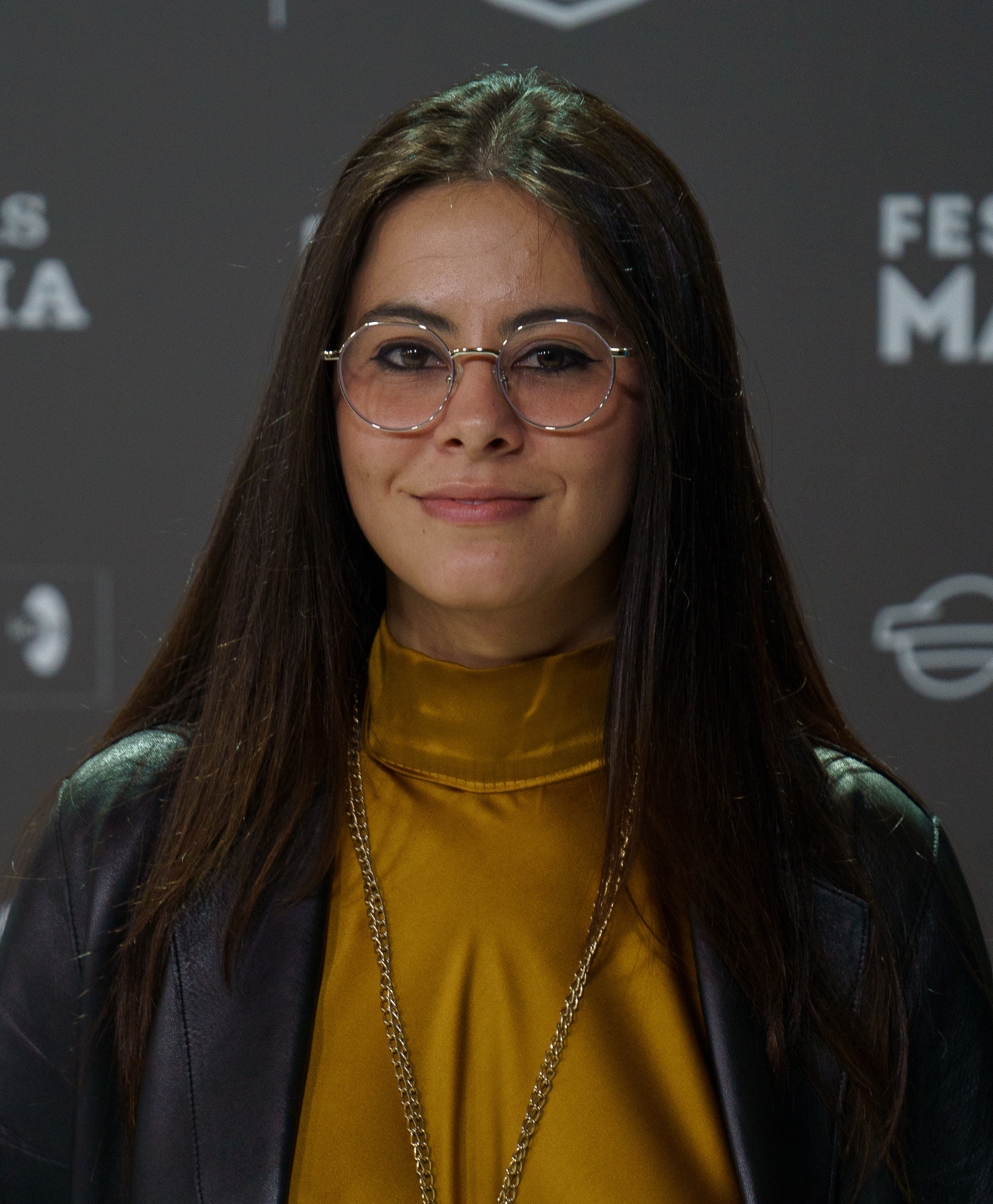
- Gala del Sol at the Red Carpet of the Malaga 2025 Festival at Malaga City Council
- Born: Natalia Hermida; April 7, 1996 (age 30); Colombia
- Occupations: Filmmaker, creative consultant
- Years active: 2016–present

Natalia Hermida, known professionally as Gala del Sol, is a Spanish-Colombian filmmaker. She was nominated for the Student Academy Awards for her Chapman University short film Transient Passengers, in 2018. She is the writer-director of the feature film Rains Over Babel, which had its world premiere at the Sundance Film Festival in 2025 and was selected as the Colombian entry for the Best International Feature Film at the 99th Academy Awards.

== Career ==
Del Sol graduated with a Bachelor of Fine Arts in Film Production from Chapman University’s Dodge College of Film and Media Arts in Los Angeles, California. In 2025, she premiered her genre-blending debut feature film Rains Over Babel (Llueve sobre Babel), a reimagining of Dante's Inferno through a queer, tropical-punk lens. The film is set in the mythical City of Maya, a retrofuturistic version of Cali, Colombia, and follows a group of misfits who converge at Babel, a dive bar doubling as purgatory, where they gamble years of their lives with La Flaca, the city’s personified Grim Reaper. The film had its World Premiere at the Sundance Film Festival and its International Premiere at the International Film Festival Rotterdam. Manuel Betancourt, a film critic for Variety, covered the film’s premiere, writing, “With her Sundance debut, writer-director Gala del Sol announces herself as a fabulous off-kilter voice in contemporary cinema" and describing the film as a "maximalist triumph." The film had its Colombian premiere April 16th, 2026, and managed to run for 9 weeks in the commercial chain Cinecolombia, becoming the most watched Colombian film of 2026.

In June 2025, The Hollywood Reporter included Rains Over Babel as one of the "top 10 Hispanic Films of 2025".

The film won the Panorama España Grand Jury Award at Las Palmas de Gran Canaria International Film Festival in April 2025. It went on to win the Jury Award for Best First Feature at the Inside Out Film and Video Festival in Canada, May 2025. On June 29, 2025, it won Best International Feature at the Pride Awards held at the Lincoln Center in New York City. The award was handed by TV personality and queer icon, Dominique Jackson.

In July 2025, Del Sol was named by Variety as one of the "10 Colombian filmmakers to watch".

Rains Over Babel was selected by the Colombian Academy of Motion Pictures as their 2027 entry for the Goya Awards and as the Colombian entry for the Best International Feature Film at the 99th Academy Awards.

Del Sol signed for management with M88, a Los Angeles-based talent representation firm, in February 2025.

== Filmography ==
Year	Title	Contribution	Note
2016	Sekhem	Director, writer, editor and producer	Short film
2017	Gamberger	Director, writer and editor	Short film
2018	The Sandman	Director and writer	Short film
2018	Transient Passengers	Director, writer and editor	Short film
2025	Rains Over Babel	Director, writer, editor and producer	Feature film

== Awards and nominations ==
Year	Result	Award	Category	Work	Ref.
2018	Nominated	Student Academy Awards	Alternative	Transient Passengers	
2019	Nominated	Brooklyn Film Festival	Best Experimental Film	Transient Passengers	
2025	Nominated	Sundance Film Festival	NEXT Innovator Award	Rains Over Babel	
2025	Nominated	Premio Sebastiane	Sebastiane Latino Award	Rains Over Babel	
2025	Nominated	Guadalajara Film Festival	Maguey Award	Rains Over Babel	
2025	Nominated	Miami Film Festival	Jordan Ressler First Feature Award	Rains Over Babel	
2025	Nominated	San Francisco International Film Festival	Golden Gate Award	Rains Over Babel	
2025	Nominated	Malaga Film Festival	Zonazine, Palmarés	Rains Over Babel	
2025	Nominated	Brussels International Fantastic Film Festival	White Raven Critic's Award	Rains Over Babel	
2025	Won	Las Palmas de Gran Canaria International Film Festival	Panorama España Award	Rains Over Babel	
2025	Won	Inside Out Film and Video Festival	Best First Feature	Rains Over Babel	
2025	Won	Pride Awards	Best International Feature	Rains Over Babel	
2025	Won	Out Film Connecticut LGBTQ Film Festival	Best Feature Film	Rains Over Babel	
