= Perpetual Adolescent =

- Promotional release poster
- Directed by: Eduardo Esquivel
- Written by: Eduardo Esquivel; Sofía Gómez-Córdova; Omar Robles
- Produced by: Omar Robles Cano; Julia Cherrier; Carlos H. Quiñónez
- Starring: Teresa Sánchez; Emma Dib; Magdalena Caraballo; Ruth Ramos; Andrés David
- Cinematography: Bruno Santamaría Razo
- Edited by: Carlos Cárdenas Aguilar
- Music by: Pablo Horn
- Production companies: Muchachxs Salvajes; Calouma Films; Ikki Films
- Distributed by: Pimienta Films
- Release date: May 30, 2025 (FICUNAM)
- Running time: 104 minutes
- Countries: Mexico; France
- Language: Spanish

Perpetual Adolescent (Spanish: La eterna adolescente, lit. 'The eternal teenager'), also known as Eternal Adolescent, is a 2025 melodrama film co-written and directed by Eduardo Esquivel. A co-production between Mexico and France, the film features an ensemble cast made up of Teresa Sánchez, Emma Dib, Magdalena Caraballo, Ruth Ramos and Andrés David.

== Synopsis ==
Three estranged siblings, on an unusually cold Christmas Eve in Guadalajara, are forced to reunite after their mother's alarming bout of melancholy leaves her in the hospital. Among dusty archives, the past resurfaces, forcing them to rebuild what they thought was lost.

== Cast ==
- Teresa Sánchez as Sony
- Emma Dib as Cristina
- Magdalena Caraballo as Gema
- Ruth Ramos as Tati
- Andrés David
- Jesús Estrada Escobedo as Quique
- Alexandra García Villafuerte as Cristina

== Production ==
=== Script ===
The film's plot began to be written in 2019, inspired by his own family's story and the suicide of his maternal aunt who was a teenager.

=== Filming ===
Principal photography began in early 2023 and wrapped in mid-March of the same year in Guadalajara, Mexico. The film was also shot on location in Manzanillo and Toronto, Canada.

== Release ==
Perpetual Adolescent had its world premiere on May 30, 2025, at the 15th UNAM International Film Festival, then screened on July 26, 2025, at the 28th Guanajuato International Film Festival.

Pimienta Films will handle the Mexican theatrical release of the film.

== Accolades ==
Year	Award / Festival	Category	Recipient	Result	Ref.
2025	15th UNAM International Film Festival	Churubusco Incentive Award	Perpetual Adolescent	Won	
2025	28th Guanajuato International Film Festival	Best Mexican Fiction Feature Film	Perpetual Adolescent	Won	
