= Chicago Latino Film Festival =

U.S. film festival

The Chicago Latino Film Festival is a U.S. film festival, focusing on Latin America and Latinos. Held annually in Chicago since 1985, it is organized by the International Latino Cultural Center (ILCC) and sponsored by a number of national corporations as well as by the local Hispanic and Latino community. It is the nation's longest-running and largest Spanish and Portuguese language film festival dedicated to Latino artists.

== Festival ==
The Festival features the work of promising Latin American filmmakers with a special emphasis on films that showcase the enormous diversity of Latin America, and that defy commonly held stereotypes about Hispanics and Latinos. The Festival screens and presents films from Latin America, the United States, the Caribbean, Spain, and Portugal.

During the majority of screenings, the audience have the opportunity to participate in discussions with local and visiting filmmakers. In an effort to highlight the importance of the artistic and educational value of all films, the Chicago Latino Film Festival is non-competitive with the exception of the coveted Audience Choice Award, as determined by the filmgoers and the Gloria Achievement Award. Since 1999, the Gloria Award has been given as a special recognition to individuals and institutions for their outstanding contributions to the Latino arts.

The Chicago Latino Film Festival presents a series of special segments as part of the general programming: Made In USA, Women In Film, Lesbian/Gay/Bisexual/Trans (LGBT) and Animation.
