= Gabriel Mascaro =

Brazilian film director (born 1983)

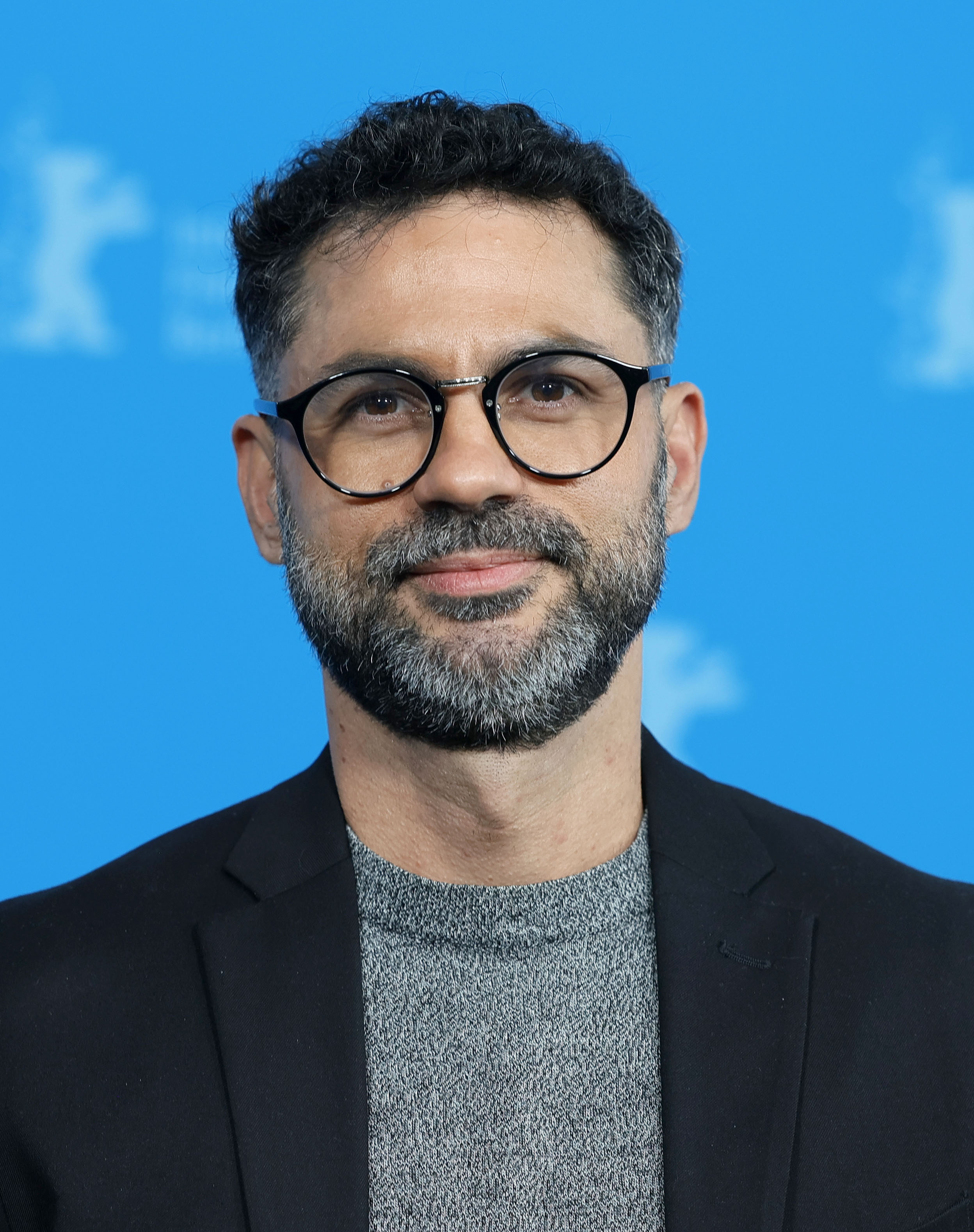
- Gabriel Mascaro at Berlinale 2025
- Born: 24 September 1983 (age 42); Recife, Brazil
- Occupations: Film director, artist
- Years active: 2008–present
- Awards: Grand Jury Prize; 2025 – The Blue Trail

Gabriel Mascaro (born September 24, 1983) is a Brazilian visual artist and film director.

== Biography ==
Gabriel Mascaro was born in Recife, the capital of the State of Pernambuco, Northeastern Brazil, on September 24, 1983. Belonging to the recent generation of Brazilian filmmakers from Pernambuco making waves on the international circuit, including Kleber Mendonça Filho, Marcelo Gomes and Cláudio Assis.

His works have been screened or exhibited at leading festivals and events, including the IDFA, Locarno International Film Festival, Rotterdam, La Biennale di Venezia - Orizzonti, Oberhausen, the Guggenheim, Videobrasil, MACBA- Museu de Arte Contemporânea de Barcelona, MoMA, Panorama da Arte Brasileira no MAM-SP and Bienal de São Paulo.

He has done artistic residencies at Videoformes, France, through Videobrasil, and at the Wexner Center for the Arts (USA). In April 2016, the first retrospective of his work was held at the Film Society of Lincoln Center, in New York City (USA).

He holds a degree in Social Communication from the Federal University of Pernambuco (UFPE).

== Career ==
He started his career as a documentary filmmaker in 2008, with KFZ-1348 (co-directed by Marcelo Pedroso), . Ostensibly a search to track down the former owners of a Volkswagen Beetle registered under the license plate KFZ-1348, the film takes the car as its main device and approaches the lives of its owners as a privileged window onto Brazilian society. The documentary won the Special Jury Prize at the 32nd São Paulo International Film Festival.

His 2009's High-rise (Um Lugar ao Sol), was screened at over thirty film festivals, including BAFICI and Visions du Réel. The documentary follows the private world of those living in luxury penthouses in Recife, Rio de Janeiro and São Paulo. The film uses interviews with these residents to fuel a debate on desire, visibility, insecurity, status and power, and to develop a sensorial discourse on Brazilian social and architectural paradigms. According to the Los Angeles Weekly, the film “effortlessly provokes thoughts on inequality, satisfaction and oblivion”.

In 2010, Mascaro launched another documentary, Avenida Brasília Formosa. “It’s a film about the disconnect between urban planning policy and the dreams and desires of the city folk”, wrote the film critic Carlos Minuano. The film debuted on the Bright Future program at the Rotterdam Festival, which also awarded him a script-development grant for Neon Bull (2015) through the Hubert Bals Fund.

In 2012, Mascaro released the documentary Housemaids (Doméstica), in which he handed the camera over to seven teenagers tasked with filming their respective housemaids for the period of one week so that the director could turn the raw footage into a finished film. The final result sparked widespread debate among critics and researchers. Strategically released in commercial cinemas on Labour Day, Housemaids was considered “a historic documentary”. The film premiered abroad at the 2012 edition of the International Documentary Film Festival Amsterdam. It won awards at the main Brazilian festivals, such as Brasília, Panorama de Cinema and Cachoeiradoc. Writing in the Estado de São Paulo newspaper, film critic Luis Carlos Merten said that “No other film does nearly as much as Housemaids to portray a reality long seared into the Brazilian unconscious”. In 2013, Mascaro launched the short-film Ebb and Flow (A onda traz, o vento leva) (2012), a documentary that portrays the everyday life of Rodrigo, a deaf man whose job is to instal sound systems in cars. The project for the documentary received an ArtAids award in 2011 and, upon release, was screened at the Barcelona Museum of Contemporary Art and at numerous festivals, including the IDFA and the Festival de Brasília, where it won the best editing prize.

Mascaro's first fiction feature-film was released in 2014. August Winds had its international debut at the Locarno Festival, and received the best film prize at the Festival Internacional du Film d'Amiens and best photography and best actress awards at the 47th Festival de Brasília. The film accompanies Shirley, who leaves the big city for the quiet life in a small seaside town in order to look after her sick grandmother. She works as a tractor driver on a coconut farm, where, despite the isolation, she develops a taste for punk rock and dreams of becoming a tattoo artist.

The following year Mascaro brought out his second narrative feature, Neon Bull (Boi Neon) (2015), which brought him widespread international acclaim. The film had its world premiere at the 72nd Venice Film Festival, where he won the Special Jury Prize at the Orizzonti section. It won a special mention at the 2019 TIFF, and also won other prizes at the Festival of Rio, Warsaw Film Festival, Adelaide Film Festival, and Cartagena Film Festival. At the Marrakech Festival, Mascaro received the best director award from the hands of director Francis Ford Coppola, one of the jurors at the event. A vocal fan of the film, singer/songwriter Caetano Veloso wrote about Neon Bull for the American press (republished in the Folha de São Paulo newspaper), calling the film a “unique cinematographic work”. For Veloso, “It’s a poem of genders and the proximity between animal and human life (…) a humanity that strives for social ascension, but also for the sublime”. Chief film critic with Indiewire, Eric Kohn described the film as “Lyrically involving and deeply sensual”, and declared it “the great discovery of this year’s Toronto Festival”. He further discussed the film's originality in a second article entitled: “How Gabriel Mascaro invented a new kind of cinema”.

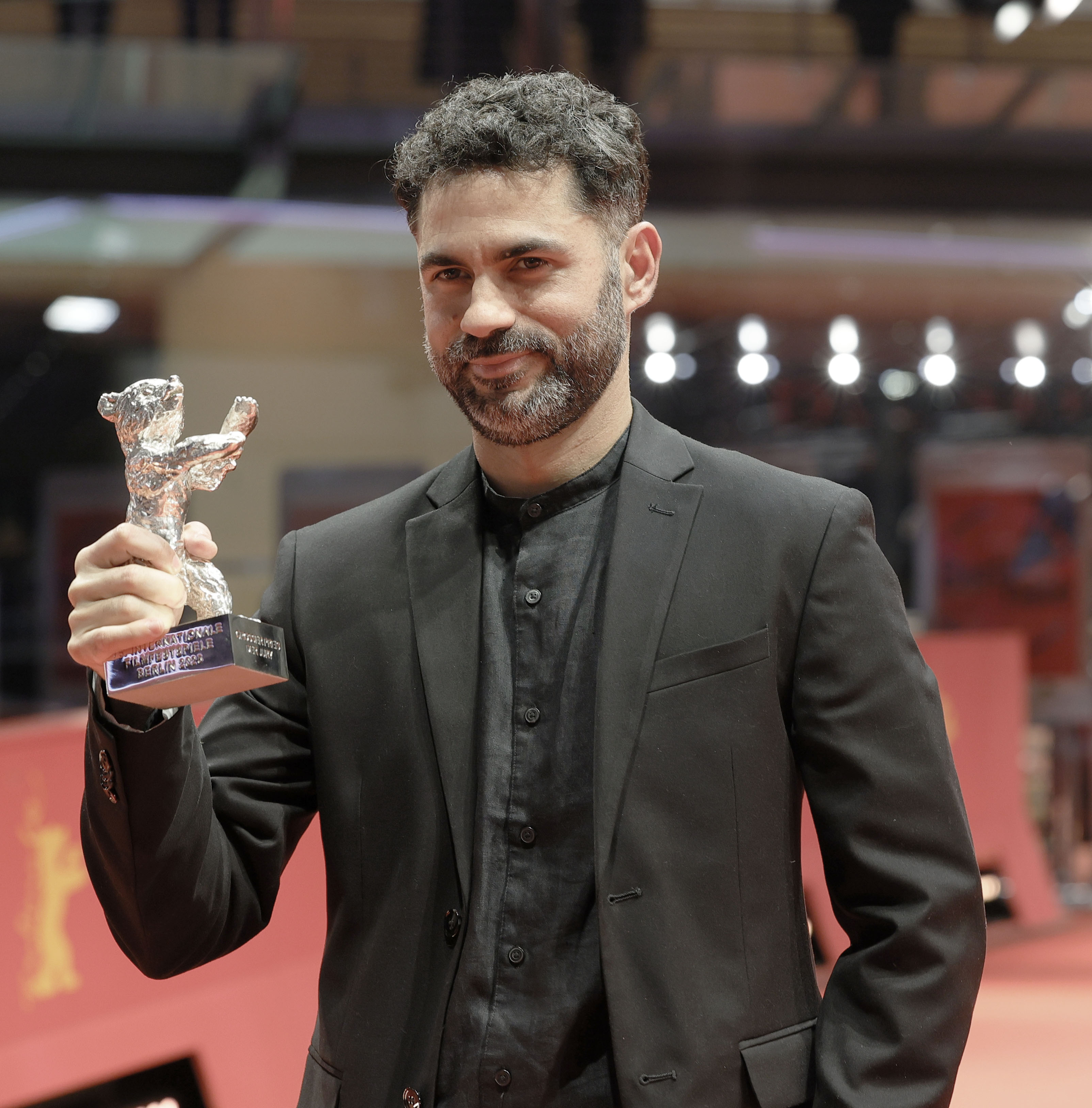
Mascaro, Winner of Silver Bear Grand Jury Prize at the 75th Berlin International Film Festival

Neon Bull's critical acclaim fuelled interest in the director's filmography. In April 2016, the curator Dennis Lim organised a retrospective at the Lincoln Center (New York) entitled “Ebbs and Flows”, featuring all of Mascaro's feature-length work since High-Rise. Neon Bull was shown during the New Directors/New Films Festival, also at the Lincoln Center.

In 2019, Mascaro's Divine Love had its world premiered at the Sundance Film Festival World Cinema Dramatic Competition, followed by screenings at the 2019 Berlinale. Receiving positive reviews from critics, the film was chose by The Hollywood Reporter and Screen International as one of the best films of 2019.

In 2025, Mascaro's The Blue Trail was selected for the Main Competition of the 75th Berlin International Film Festival, where it had its world premiere on 16 February 2025, and won the Silver Bear Grand Jury Prize.

In June 2025, Mascaro was invited to join the Directors Branch of the Academy of Motion Picture Arts and Sciences.

== Filmography ==
=== Feature films ===
Year	English Title	Original title	Notes
2010	As Aventuras de Paulo Bruscky		
2014	August Winds	Ventos de Agosto	Special Mention at the Locarno International Film Festival; Best Director at the VII Janela Internacional de Cinema do Recife; FIESEL Award at the Mar del Plata Film Festival; Licorno D'Or at the Festival Internacional du Film d'Amiens; Special Jury Prize at the Starz Denver Film Festival; Best Film at the Istanbul International Independent Film Festival
2015	Neon Bull	Boi Neon	Orizzonti Special Jury Prize at Venice Film Festival; Platform Special Mention at the Toronto International Film Festival; Festival do Rio- Best Film; Festival do Rio- Best Screenplay; Festival do Rio- Best Screenplay; Hamburg Film Festival- FIPRESCI Award; Nominated-Platform Award at the Toronto International Film Festival; Nominated-Orizzonti Award at the Venice Film Festival; Warsaw Grand Prix at the 31st Warsaw International Film Festival
2019	Divine Love	Divino Amor	
2025	The Blue Trail	O Último Azul	Winner - Silver Bear Grand Jury Prize at the 75th Berlin International Film Festival Nominated - Golden Bear at the 75th Berlin International Film Festival

=== Documentaries ===
Year	English title	Original Title	Notes
2008	KFZ-1348		
2009	High-Rise	Um Lugar ao Sol	Special Mention at the Buenos Aires International Festival of Independent Cinema; Jury Prize for best documentary at the Santiago International Documentary Film Festival in Chile; Jury Prize at the Rio de Janeiro International Ethnographic Cinema Exhibition
2010	Av. Brasília Teimosa		
2012	Ebb and Flow	A Onda Traz o Vento Leva	
2012	Housemaids	Doméstica	
