= Cine Colombia =

Cine Colombia S.A.S
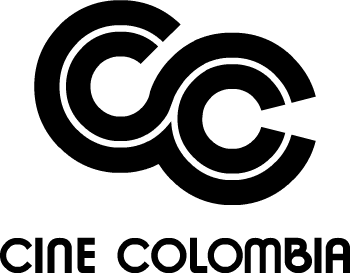

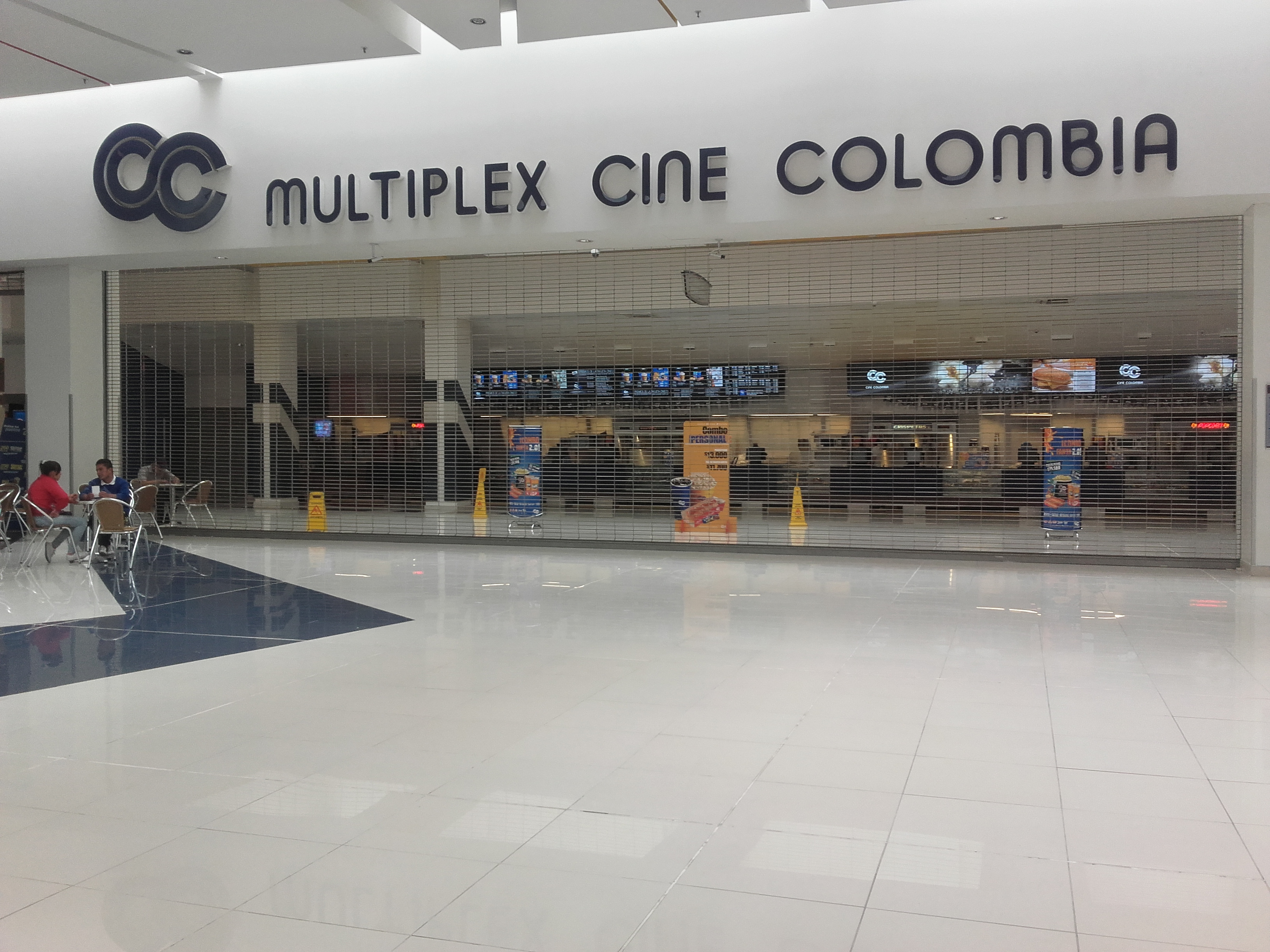
- A location at Centro Mayor
- Trade name: Cine Colombia
- Industry: Entertainment
- Founded: 1927; 99 years ago
- Headquarters: Bogotá, Colombia
- Website: www.cinecolombia.com

Cine Colombia is a Colombian movie theater company based in Bogotá. It is owned by the Grupo Santo Domingo and is the largest movie theater chain in the country. It was founded in 1927 by twenty businessmen from Medellín in order to open the country's first movie theater. The company then passed through several owners before reaching its current owners. As of March 2016, Cine Colombia has a presence in 12 Colombian cities and has 42 multiplexes, 280 screens, and 54,321 seats. In 2012, it incorporated Auro-3D screens that were 4 stories high and 6 wide.

== History ==
Cine Colombia was founded on June 7, 1927, in Medellín, when 20 businessmen established the Cine Colombia with the purpose of building movie theaters and operating, renting, buying, and selling films.

Since its inception, the objective for the company has been to build theaters. Initially, the company operated only in Medellín, using the old España circus as its theater. It was originally used for bullfights during the day and at night, the arena was converted into a cinema with projectors showing the films on a large screen. In October 1928, it acquired the Di Doménico Hermanos company which had its own films and some theaters. After the acquisition, Cine Colombia was able to discuss with main producers in the United States for their films.

On June 13, 1972, Cine Colombia debuted the country's first drive-in theater, El Limonar, in the city of Cali. Later, construction began on Bogotá's first movie theater complex with multiple screens and the multiplex opened on January 31, 1975.

At the end of 1988, the Mayagüez Group of Valle del Cauca purchased Cine Colombia. After 19 years as the majority shareholder, the Mayagüez Group made the decision to sell its shares in order to devote its attention to its own sugar business. In 2010, negotiations began that would conclude with the purchase of the majority of the company's shares by Santo Domingo Group.
