= It Would Be Night in Caracas =

2025 film

- Festival release poster
- Directed by: Mariana Rondón; Marité Ugás
- Written by: Mariana Rondón; Marité Ugás
- Based on: La hija de la española by Karina Sainz Borgo
- Produced by: Stacy Perskie; Édgar Ramírez; Stephanie Correa; Jill Littman
- Starring: Natalia Reyes; Moisés Angola; Sheila Monterola
- Cinematography: Juan Pablo Ramírez
- Edited by: Soledad Salfate
- Music by: Camilo Froideval
- Production companies: Redrum; Absolute Artists; Impression Entertainment
- Release date: 4 September 2025 (Venice)
- Running time: 97 minutes
- Countries: Mexico; Venezuela
- Language: Spanish

It Would Be Night in Caracas (Spanish: Aún es de noche en Caracas) is a 2025 drama film directed by Mariana Rondón and Marité Ugás. It is based on Karina Sainz Borgo's novel La hija de la española and follows a woman trying to survive the political and social collapse during the Crisis in Venezuela.

== Plot ==
Set in Caracas during the heightened tensions of 2017, the film follows Adelaida (Natalia Reyes), who returns home after her mother's funeral to find their apartment seized by a violent female militia led by the ruthless Mariscala (Sheila Monterola). As protests, repression and shortages intensify, Adelaida is forced onto the streets of a collapsing city where institutions have broken down and violence is commonplace.

When she discovers that a neighbour with Spanish residency has died, Adelaida sees an opportunity to assume her identity and escape the country. The film tracks a few days in her life as she navigates militia checkpoints, corrupt officials and an increasingly lawless environment, weighing the moral cost of survival against the possibility of exile.

== Cast ==
- Natalia Reyes as Adelaida
- Moisés Angola
- Sheila Monterola as Mariscala
- Édgar Ramírez
- Samantha Castillo
- Vicente peña
- Leonidas Urbina

== Production ==
The film is written and directed by Venezuelan filmmakers Mariana Rondón and Marité Ugás, known for their previous collaborations such as Bad Hair. It was produced by Stacy Perskie for Redrum, Édgar Ramírez for Absolute Artists, and Stephanie Correa and Jill Littman for Impression Entertainment. Principal photography took place in Mexico, with production design by Ezra Buenrostro and cinematography by Juan Pablo Ramírez, aiming to recreate the atmosphere of a Caracas in crisis. The score was composed by Camilo Froideval, with sound design by Lena Esquenazi.

== Release ==
It Would Be Night in Caracas had its world premiere in the Venezia Spotlight section of the Venice Film Festival on 4 September 2025.

== Reception ==
At its festival premieres, the film received positive notices for its tense atmosphere and political urgency. In a review for Variety, Jessica Kiang praised the film as a “powerful, urgent human drama” and highlighted Natalia Reyes's performance as central to the film's emotional impact.
