= A Day Without a Mexican =

2004 film directed by Sergio Arau

- Theatrical release poster
- Directed by: Sergio Arau
- Screenplay by: Yareli Arizmendi; Sergio Arau; Sergio Guerrero
- Based on: A Day Without a Mexican by Yareli Arizmendi and Sergio Arau
- Produced by: Eckehardt Von Damm; Isaac Artenstein
- Starring: Yareli Arizmendi; John Getz; Maureen Flannigan; Muse Watson; Fernando Arau; Eduardo Palomo
- Cinematography: Alan Caudillo
- Edited by: Daniel A. Fort
- Music by: Juan J. Colomer
- Distributed by: Televisa Cine
- Release date: May 14, 2004
- Running time: 100 minutes
- Countries: United States; Mexico; Spain
- Languages: English; Spanish
- Box office: $10.1 million

A Day Without a Mexican is a 2004 fantasy film directed by Sergio Arau in his directorial debut from a screenplay co-written with Yareli Arizmendi and Sergio Guerrero. It stars Yareli Arizmendi, John Getz, Maureen Flannigan, Muse Watson, Fernando Arau, and Eduardo Palomo. The plot offers a satirical look at the consequences of all the Mexicans in the state of California suddenly disappearing (with a mysterious "pink fog" surrounding the state preventing any communication with or access to the outside world). The film earned over $10 million at the box office and received generally negative reviews from critics.

== Cast ==
- Yareli Arizmendi as TV reporter Lila Rodriguez
- León Singer as Lila's father
- Caroline Aaron as Aunt Gigi
- Elpidia Carrillo as Cata
- Yeniffer Behrens as Suzy
- Gwendoline Yeo as a TV newscaster
- Larry Carroll as a TV newscaster
- John Getz as U.S. Senator Steven Abercombie III
- Melinda Allen as his wife, Ellen Abercrombie
- Suzanne Friedline as Vicki Martin
- Maureen Flannigan as Mary Jo Quintana
- Salli Saffioti as Mary Jo's neighbor
- Frankie J. Allison as Officer Carr
- Fernando Arau as Undocumented 1
- Muse Watson as Louis McClaire
- Carlos Gómez as Jose Velasquez Diaz
- Bru Muller as George McClaire
- Tony Abatemarco as a television talk show host
- Eduardo Palomo as Roberto Quintana

== Release ==
The film opened on May 14, 2004, in limited release throughout Southern California and on September 17 in theaters in Chicago, Texas, Florida, and New York City as well as San Jose.

== Reception ==
=== Box office ===
A Day Without a Mexican grossed $5.9 million in Mexico, and $4.2 million in the United States and Canada, for a worldwide total of $10.1 million. In Mexico, the film earned $2.7 million from 330 theaters in its opening weekend. In the United States, the film was only a moderate box-office success, earning $628,807 in its first weekend.

=== Critical response ===
The film received negative reviews from critics. On the review aggregator website Rotten Tomatoes, 27% of 22 critics' reviews are positive, with an average rating of 4.2/10. The website's consensus reads: "Day Without a Mexican is a preachy and heavy-handed satire that fails to deliver anything of substance." Metacritic, which uses a weighted average, assigned the film a score of 30 out of 100, based on 11 critics, indicating "generally unfavorable" reviews.

Ella Taylor of the LA Weekly said of the film, "A terrific premise is mangled to a pulp, then beaten to death in this forced mockumentary." E! was less kind, stating, "This Day not only lacks Mexicans but also good acting, sharp storytelling, and humor." At the Cartagena Film Festival, the film earned a nomination for Best Film and won Best Screenplay. It also earned a special jury award at the Gramado Film Festival and Best Editing at the Guadalajara Film Festival.

== See also ==
- Day of Absence, a Douglas Turner Ward play that originally premiered Off-off-Broadway in 1965, in which white residents of a Southern town react to the sudden and inexplicable disappearance of all black residents - and which is typically performed by black actors in 'whiteface'.
- The City Without Jews, a 1924 film based upon the premise of a nationalist coup in Austria, and life in Vienna after all Jewish people have been legally forced to leave the country - the film was adapted from Hugo Bettauer's 1922 novel of the same name, but Bettauer later disavowed the film and was murdered by a former member of the Nazi Party several months later.
- Berlin Without Jews, a 1925 novel by Arthur Landsberger, likely inspired by Bettauer's novel, but set in Germany.
