= History of the Jews in Vienna =

The history of the Jews in Vienna, Austria, goes back over eight hundred years. There is evidence of a Jewish presence in Vienna from the 12th century onwards.

At the end of the 19th century and the start of the 20th century, Vienna was one of the most prominent centres of Jewish culture in Europe, but during the period of Nazi rule in Austria, Vienna's Jewish population was almost entirely deported and murdered in the Holocaust. Since 1945, Jewish culture and society have gradually been recovering in the city.

== History ==
=== Middle Ages ===
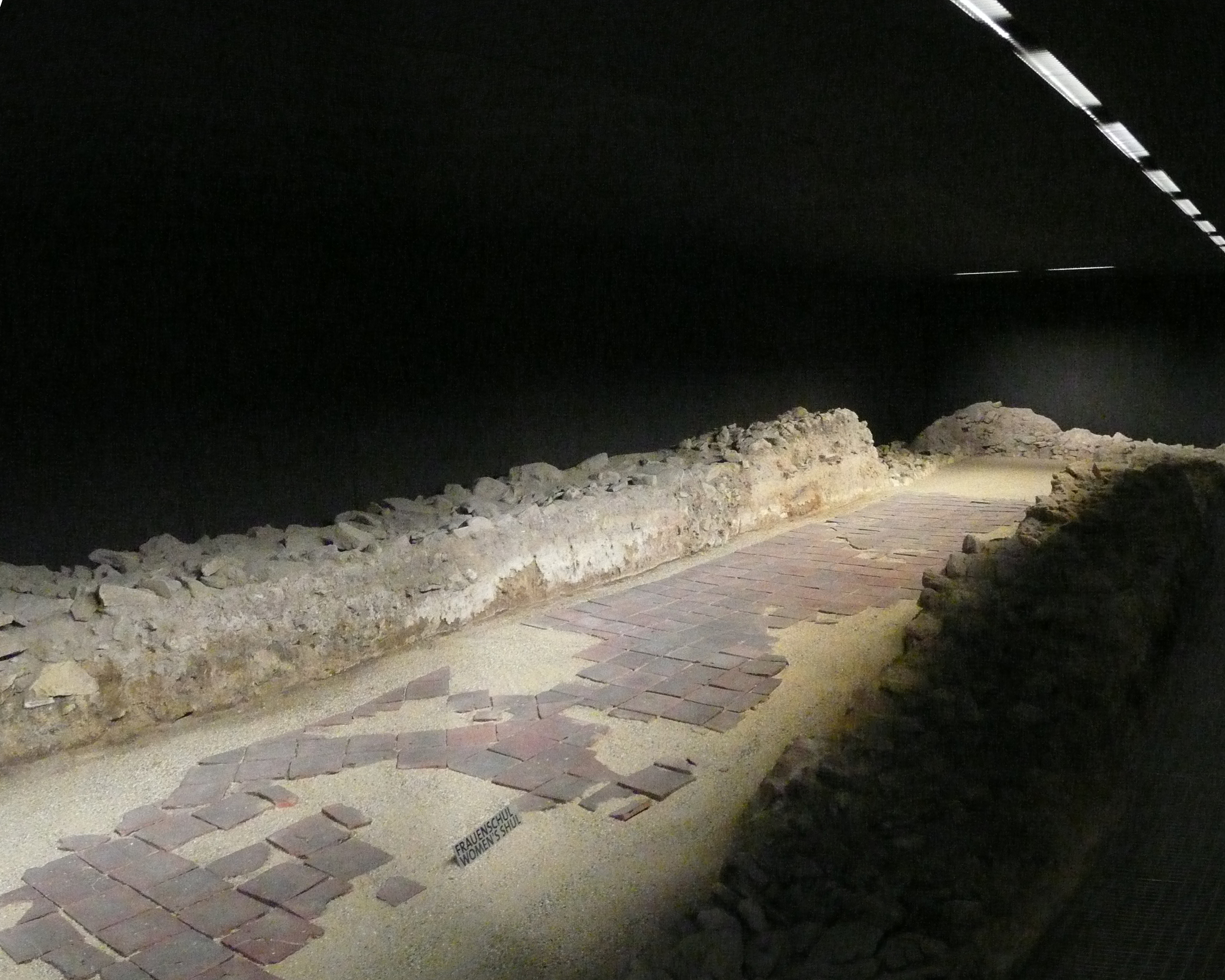
Remains of the synagogue at the Judenplatz that was destroyed in 1420/21

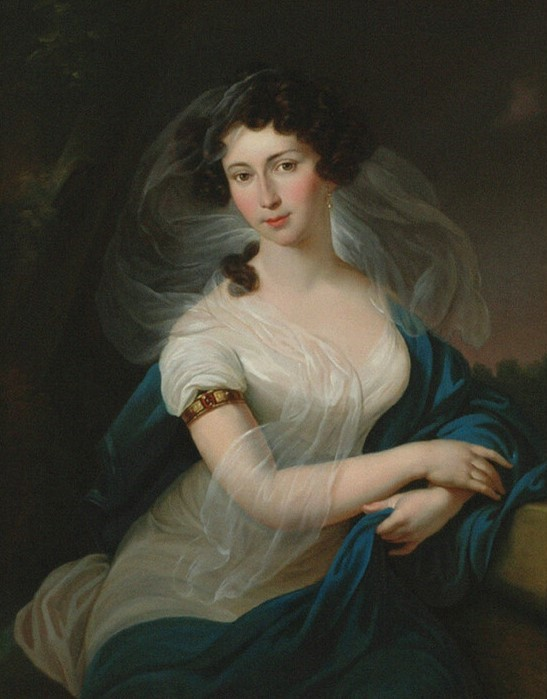
Fanny von Arnstein owned one of the most important literary salons in the city in the 18th century

The first named Jewish individual was Schlom, Duke Frederick I’s Münzmeister (master of the mint), installed in 1194. Schlom and his family would later be murdered in a pogrom by crusaders. In 1238, emperor Frederick II granted the Jews a privilege, and the existence of community institutions such as a synagogue, hospital and slaughterhouse can be proven from the 14th century onwards. Vienna’s city law empowered a special Judenrichter (Judge of the Jews) to adjudicate in disputes between Christians and Jews, but this judge was not empowered to rule in conflicts between two Jewish parties, unless one party filed a complaint with him.

The first Jews lived in the area near the Seitenstettengasse; from around 1280, they also lived around the modern-day Judenplatz. The centre of Jewish cultural and religious life was located here from the 13th to the 15th century, until the Vienna Gesera of 1420/21, when Albert V ordered the annihilation of the city’s Jews, leading to their murder, expulsion, and in some cases collective suicide.

=== Early Modern (16th–18th centuries) ===
According to one source, in the year 1512, 12 Jewish families lived in Vienna. Although there technically was a ban until 1624 on new settlement, this was repeatedly circumvented through the granting of exceptions, to the point that a new cemetery was established in the Seegasse in 1582. In 1625, Rabbi Yom-Tov Lipmann Heller became the rabbi of Vienna. At the time, the Jews of Vienna were scattered throughout the city, not having a central community. Heller obtained for the Jews the right to establish a central Jewish community in what was later to be named "Leopoldstadt", which was already then a suburb of Vienna. Jews’ rights were further restricted in 1637, leading to the second expulsion of Vienna's Jewish population in 1669/70 under Leopold I. The Jewish neighborhood was then renamed, and remains, "Leopoldstadt"."

Following the Thirty Year's War and wars with the Ottomans, including the second Ottoman siege of Vienna, dire financial straits led to Austrian emperors relying on the aid of Jewish bankers, in particular Samuel Oppenheimer and Samson Wertheimer. Samuel Oppenheimer was appointed as a financier to the court in 1683; he was also responsible for the restoration of the cemetery. Oppenheimer was able to help Samson Wertheimer from Worms to come to Vienna in 1684. Wertheimer was later named Court Jew, but he could not perform his duties as a Rabbi in Vienna and therefore left for Eisenstadt, part of the Siebengemeinden, where Jews were welcomed under Paul I, 1st Prince Esterházy of Galántha.

From 1736, there was a small Sephardic population in Vienna, which had its own religious community with a synagogue at the time of Maria Theresa. The majority Ashkenazi population only obtained the same status much later under Franz Joseph I.

Influenced by the Enlightenment, emperor Joseph II decreed his Edict of Tolerance in 1782, which granted civil rights to Jews in Austria. They were however still forbidden to form a religious community and to hold religious services in public.

=== Restoration (19th century) ===
Jewish population of Vienna according to census and particular area
Year	total pop.	Jews	Percentage
1857	476,220	2617	1.3
1869	607,510	40,277	6.6
1880	726,105	73,222	10.1
1890	817,300	99,444	12.1
1890*	1,341,190	118,495	8.8
1900	1,674,957	146,926	8.7
1910	2,031,420	175,294	8.6
1923	1,865,780	201,513	10.8
1934	1,935,881	176,034	9.1
1951	1,616,125	9000	0.6
1961	1,627,566	8354	0.5
1971	1,619,855	7747	0.5
1981	1,531,346	6527	0.4
1991	1,539,848	6554	0.4
2001	1,550,123	6988	0.5
* = after expansion of Vienna

In 1824, Michael Lazar Biedermann's recommendation led to Rabbi Isaak Mannheimer being brought from Copenhagen to Vienna. As there was still officially no Jewish religious community, Mannheimer was employed as the “Director of the imperially approved public Israelite religious school of Vienna”. Mannheimer realised cautious reforms in Vienna without provoking a schism within the Jewish population, such as those that occurred in the majority of Jewish communities in Europe in the 19th century. With Lazar Horowitz, who was summoned to Vienna as a Rabbi in 1828, Mannheimer agitated for the abolition of the discriminatory Jewish Oath. The merchant Isaak Löw Hofmann also played a leading role in Vienna's Jewish community from 1806 until his death in 1849.

On 12 December 1825, Mannheimer laid the foundation stone for the Stadttempel in the Seitensteingasse. The synagogue, which had been designed by Joseph Kornhäusel, was sanctified by Mannheimer on 9 April 1826. In the same year, Salomon Sulzer from Hohenems was appointed hazzan at the synagogue, where he served for 56 years.

Jewish intellectuals participated in the Revolution of 1848.The new elected Imperial Diet, meeting for the first time in July 1848, included four Jewish deputies, three of whom were elected from Vienna.

In 1867, under Emperor Franz Joseph I, Jews gained equal recognition under the law. As a consequence of equal recognition, the Jewish community in Vienna grew rapidly: in 1860, the Jewish community in Vienna numbered 6,200; in 1870, that number had already risen to 40,200, and at the turn of the century, to 147,000. Vienna's 2nd district, Leopoldstadt, developed into the centre of Vienna's Jewish life at this time. The Jewish population in this area of the city soon represented half of the entire population in the district. The neighbouring districts of Brigittenau (which was divided from Leopoldstadt in 1900) and Alsergrund equally had high proportions of Jews. The Jews that lived in these areas made up the majority of Vienna's Jewish population and belonged for the most part to the lower or middle classes – they were manual labourers, craftsmen, small-scale businessmen (e.g. café owners) and traders. Wealthy Jews lived for the most part in the villa suburbs of Döbling and Hietzing, and in the city centre, the Innere Stadt.

Theodor Herzl responded to the increasing spread of Antisemitism during this period with the founding of political Zionism. At the same time however, the Jewish community was led predominantly by assimilated Jews.

=== Collapse of the Habsburg monarchy and First Republic (1910s–1930s) ===
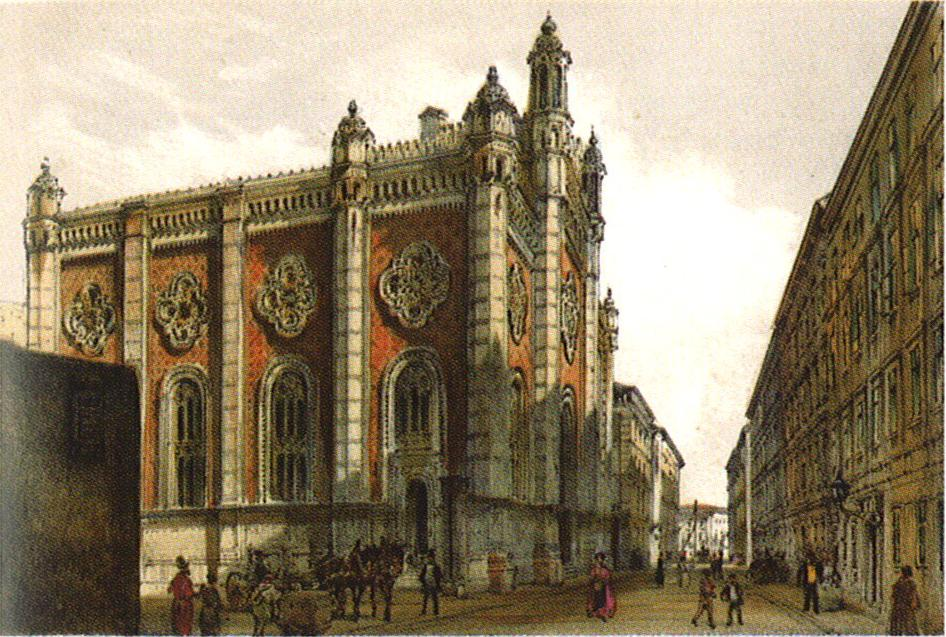
The Leopoldstädter Tempel, painted by Rudolf von Alt

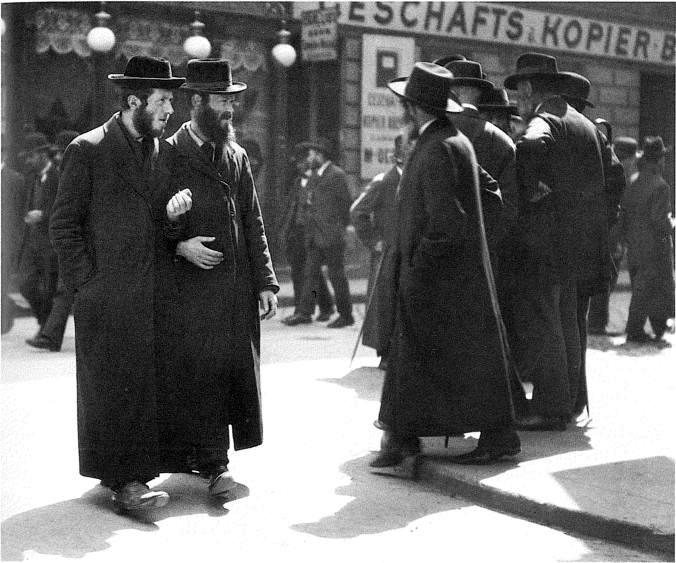
Ultra-Orthodox Jews in Leopoldstadt, 1915

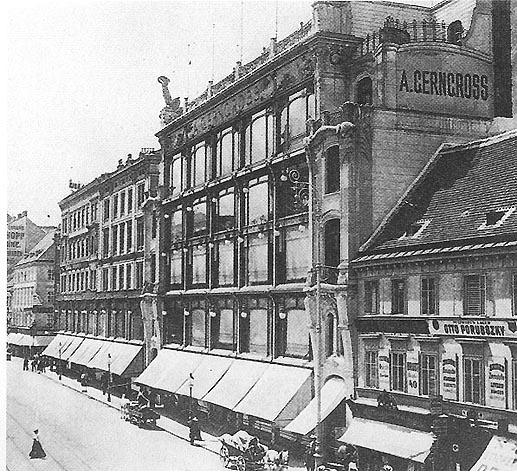
The Gerngross shopping centre, which was founded by Viennese Jews

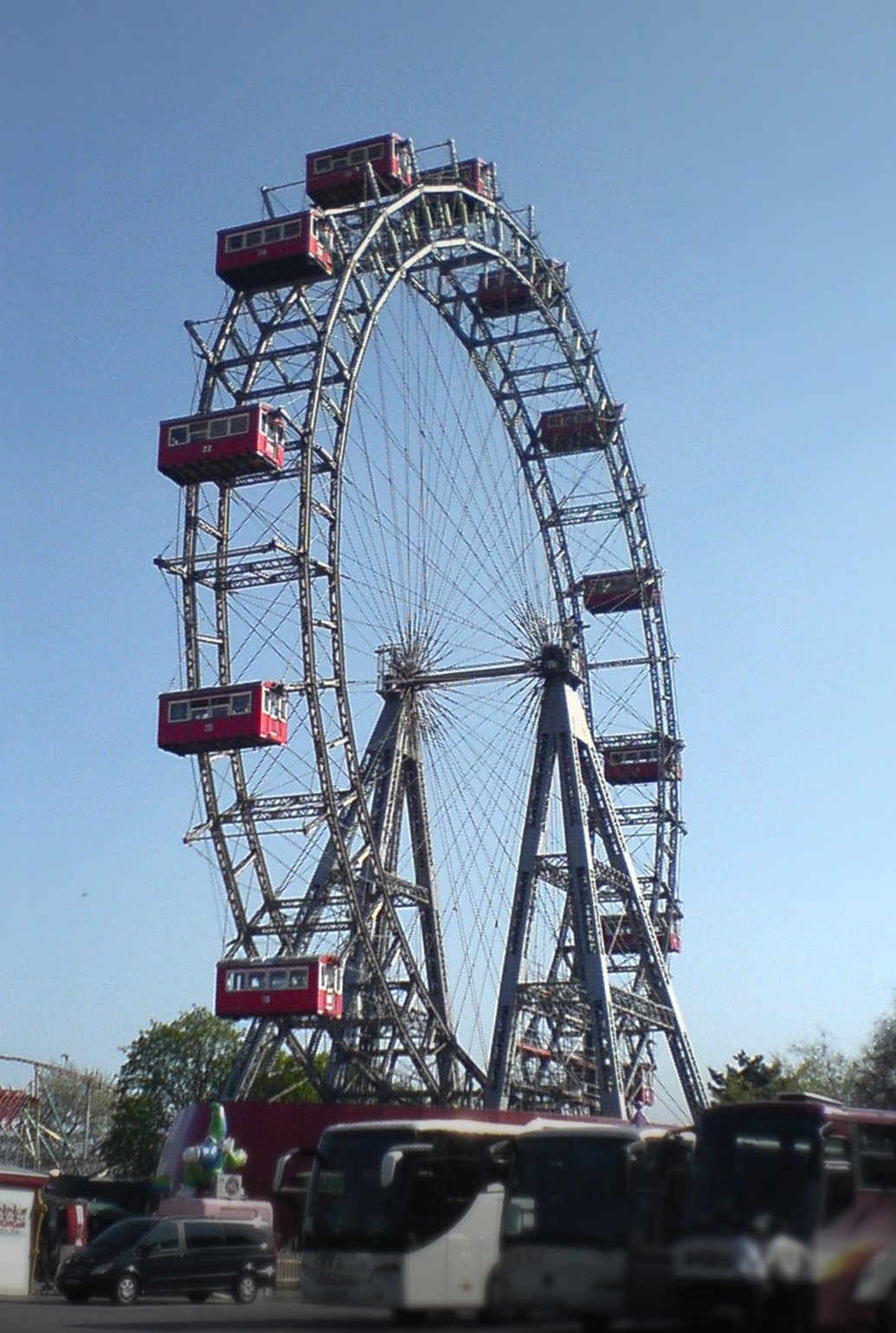
The Wiener Riesenrad was also run by Viennese Jews until 1938

After the outbreak of World War I and the first Austrian defeats on the eastern front, an exodus of 350,000 refugees began in the eastern regions of the empire (Galicia). Amongst the refugees were some 50,000 (according to the police) to 70,000 (according to the Arbeiterzeitung newspaper) Jews, who all arrived at Vienna's northern railway station in Leopoldstadt.

Although around half of these new arrivals returned to their homes once the situation had calmed down on the eastern front, the entire Jewish community in Vienna and its relations with Vienna's Christian population were put to the test by these events. The refugees were poverty-stricken, but work was hard to come by and factories were unwilling to employ the refugees. The situation has been described thus: “While the Germans were condemning the Jews in the east to forced labour, the Austrians were condemning them to forced unemployment”. Many of the refugees tried to earn their daily bread as peddlers or salesmen, and many charity organisations sprung up to coordinate clothes donations and other campaigns, but the “Ostjuden” (Eastern Jews) were the victims of many negative prejudices and because of their poverty were more frequently the targets of antisemitic attacks than wealthy assimilated Jews. It was not made easy for them to establish themselves in Vienna.

With the fall of the Habsburg Monarchy in 1918, Jews could move freely throughout Austria-Hungary. The community in Vienna numbered around 200,000. The majority of Viennese Jews lived in this neighborhood, which had served as the Jewish ghetto prior to the 1670 expulsion by Emperor Leopold. The neighborhood's Jewish population later recovered, and by the interwar years was nicknamed Mazzesinsel (matzoh island).

At this time, Vienna's Jews were divided into two groups. On the one hand, there were the Jews who had either lived for a long time in Vienna or who had been born there and who assimilated into Christian society. On the other hand, there were Orthodox Jews, who wished to live in line with traditional beliefs and practices. The community's voting habits also reveals a division; while the majority, made up for the most part of assimilated Jews, voted for the social democrats, others voted for Jewish parties, which disputed elections both in the empire and in the First Republic and which concentrated their campaign advertising on fighting the social democrats for votes. Over time, almost all Jews came to vote for the social democrats, because the Jewish parties were seen as not strong enough, while all other parties were antisemitic and refused to accept Jewish members.

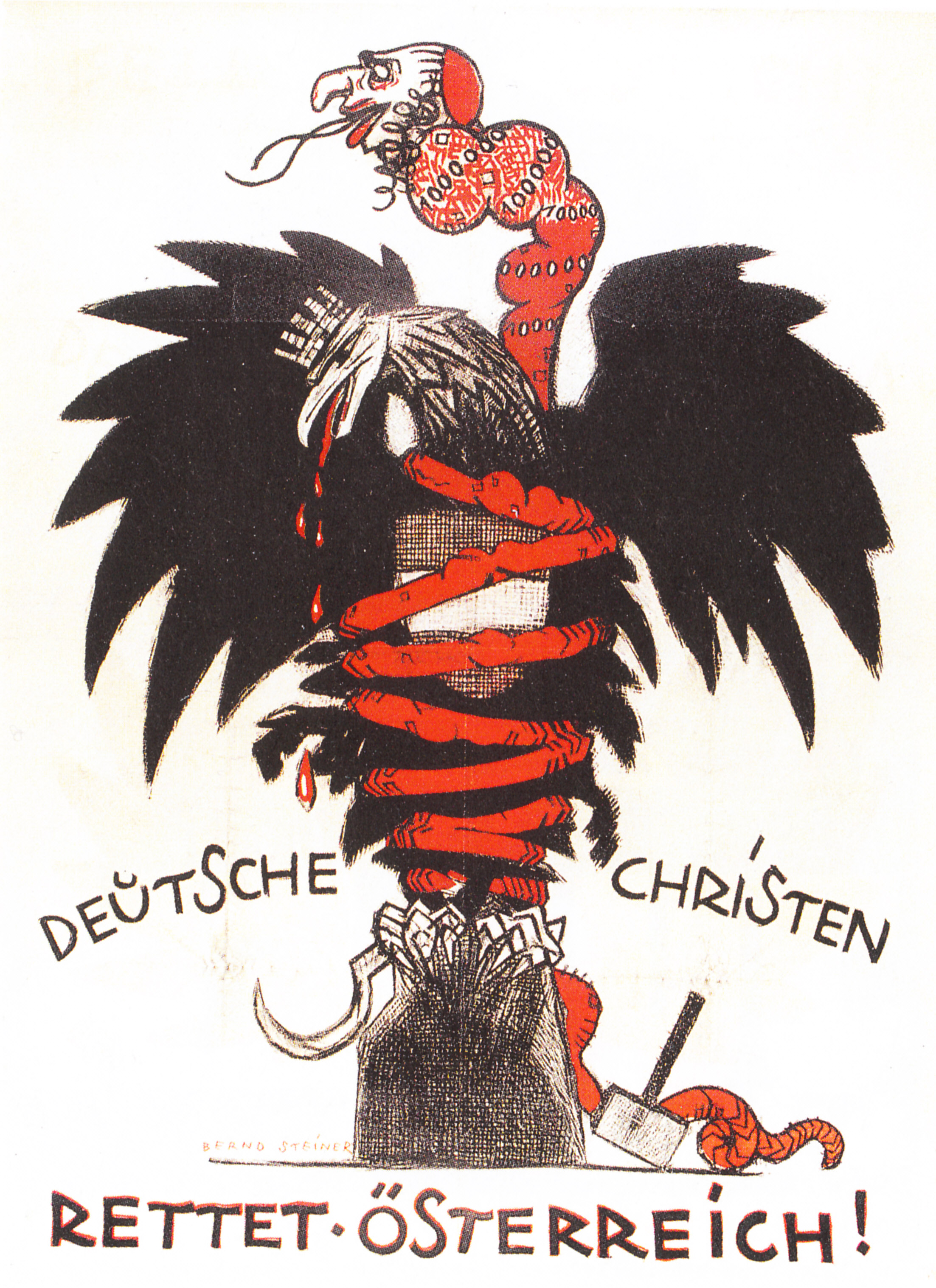
An antisemitic campaign placard used by the Christian Social Party during the 1920 elections in Austria.

Antisemitism became ever more pronounced during the first republic. In Jewish quarters, in particular in Leopoldstadt, antisemitic organisations distributed their flyers and newspapers aimed at turning the Christian population against their Jewish neighbours. A protest at the Praterstern organised by socialists and communists against such provocation ended in violence. When the German-nationalist Josef Mohapl was stabbed to death by an apolitical attacker who already had a criminal record, right-wing newspapers dubbed this the “Christian pogrom in Leopoldstadt”, and from this moment onwards, Nazi hooligans were to be seen in Leopoldstadt. One of the first attacks on prominent establishments that these groups instigated was the destruction of the well-known “Café Produktenbörse” in December 1929. The attack on a prayer room in the Café Sperlhof in 1932 was particularly violent; praying Jews were beaten and the attackers laid waste to the building.

Many Jews joined socialist and/or Zionist (youth) organisations, the largest of which were Hashomer Hatzair, Poale Zion and the Jewish Socialist Workers’ Youth. In the 1930s, some socialist, Jewish and Zionist movements united in committees for action, to organise street patrols and to take action against “Hakenkreuzler” (thugs bearing the swastika), who were attacking Jews. The first such group was the “Jüdische Selbstwehr” (Jewish Self-Defence). The paramilitary organisation Betar also had members in Vienna.

After a century of progress towards Jewish emancipation, antisemitic attacks encouraged by the Christian Social Party, the Greater German People's Party and the Nazis became more common between the two World Wars. Hugo Bettauer was amongst those who recognised the signs of the time. The film “The City Without Jews” is based on his novel with the same title.

=== The Holocaust (1938–1945) ===
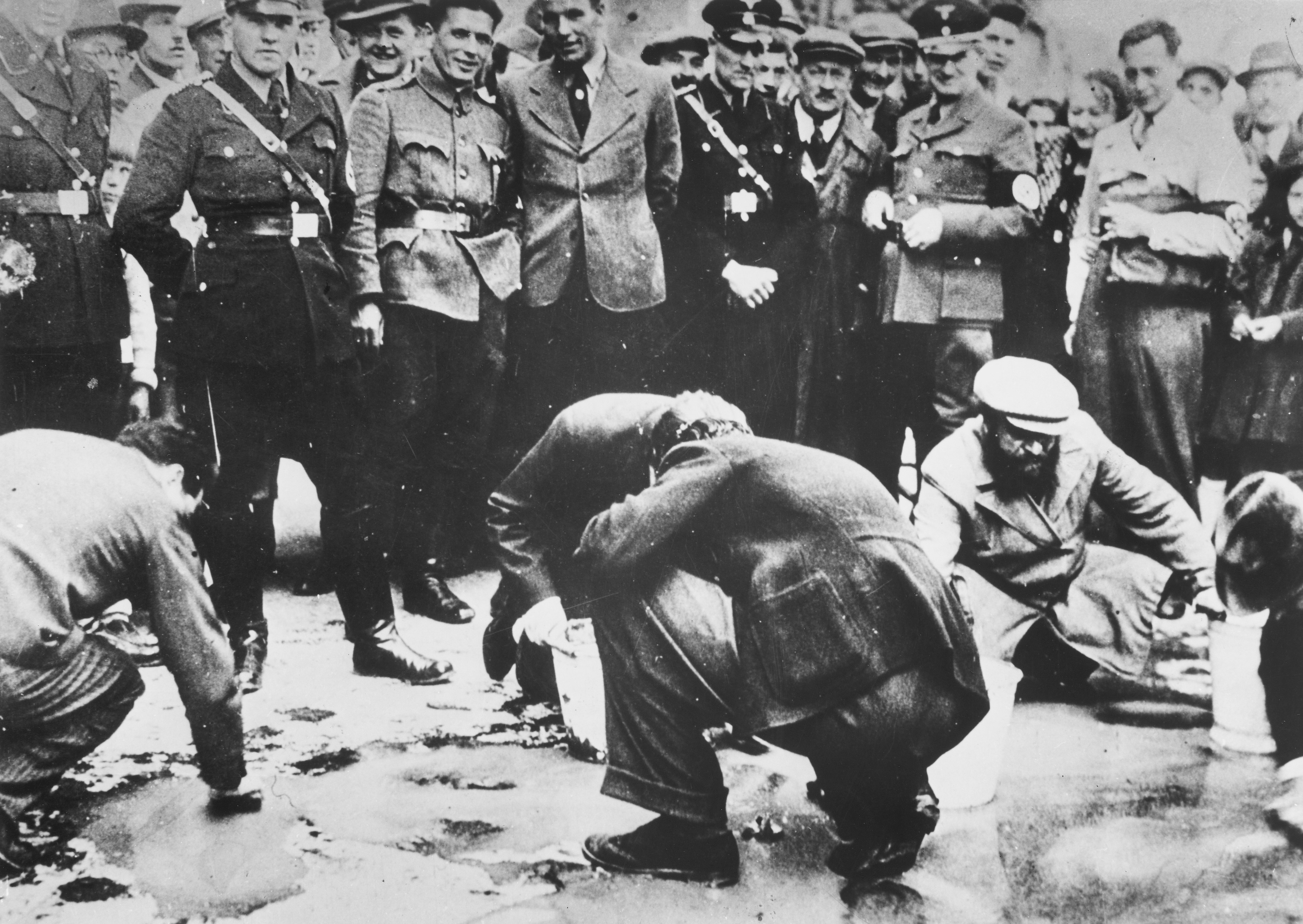
Immediately after the Anschluss, Vienna's Jews were forced by the local population to clean the city's pavements.

Following the Anschluss in March 1938, the estimated 206,000 population of Jews in Vienna faced severe harassment. They were driven through the streets of Vienna, their homes and shops were plundered and the process of Aryanisation began. These events reached their climax in the Kristallnacht pogrom of 9–10 November 1938. All synagogues and prayer houses in Vienna were destroyed except one – the Stadttempel was the sole survivor because its location in a residential area prevented it from being burned down. Most Jewish shops were plundered and then closed down; over 6000 Jews were arrested in this one night, the majority were deported to the Dachau concentration camp in the following days. The Nuremberg Laws applied in Austria from May 1938; they were reinforced with innumerable anti-semitic decrees. Jews were gradually robbed of their freedoms, were blocked from almost all professions, were shut out of schools and universities, and were forced to wear the Yellow badge.

According to the Government of Vienna, over 65,000 Viennese Jews were exported to concentration camps and murdered.

The Nazis dissolved Jewish organisations and institutions, hoping to force Jews to emigrate. Their plans succeeded – by the end of 1941, 130,000 Jews had left Vienna, 30,000 of whom went to the USA. They left behind all of their property, but were forced to pay the Reich Flight Tax, a tax on all émigrés from the Third Reich; some received financial support from international aid organisations so that they could pay this tax. Following the Wannsee Conference in January 1942, where the Nazis resolved to completely annihilate the Jewish population, the majority of the Jews who had stayed in Vienna became victims of the Holocaust. Of the more than 65,000 Viennese Jews who were deported to concentration camps, only a few more than 2000 survived.

=== Second Republic (since 1945) ===
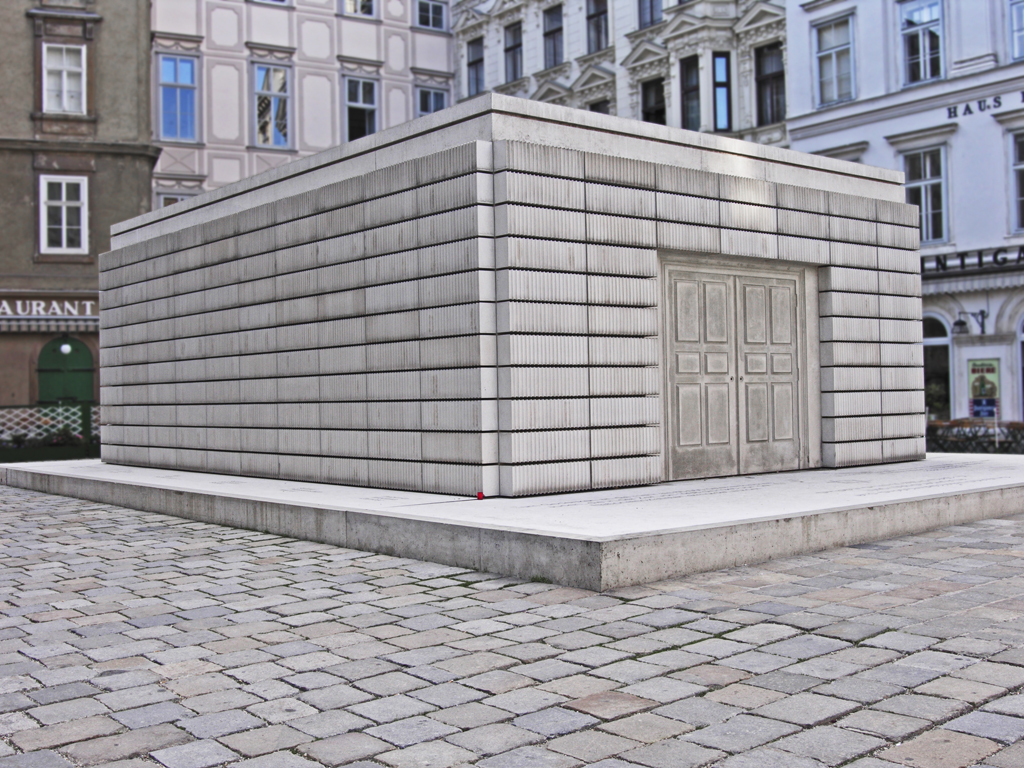
The Judenplatz Holocaust Memorial

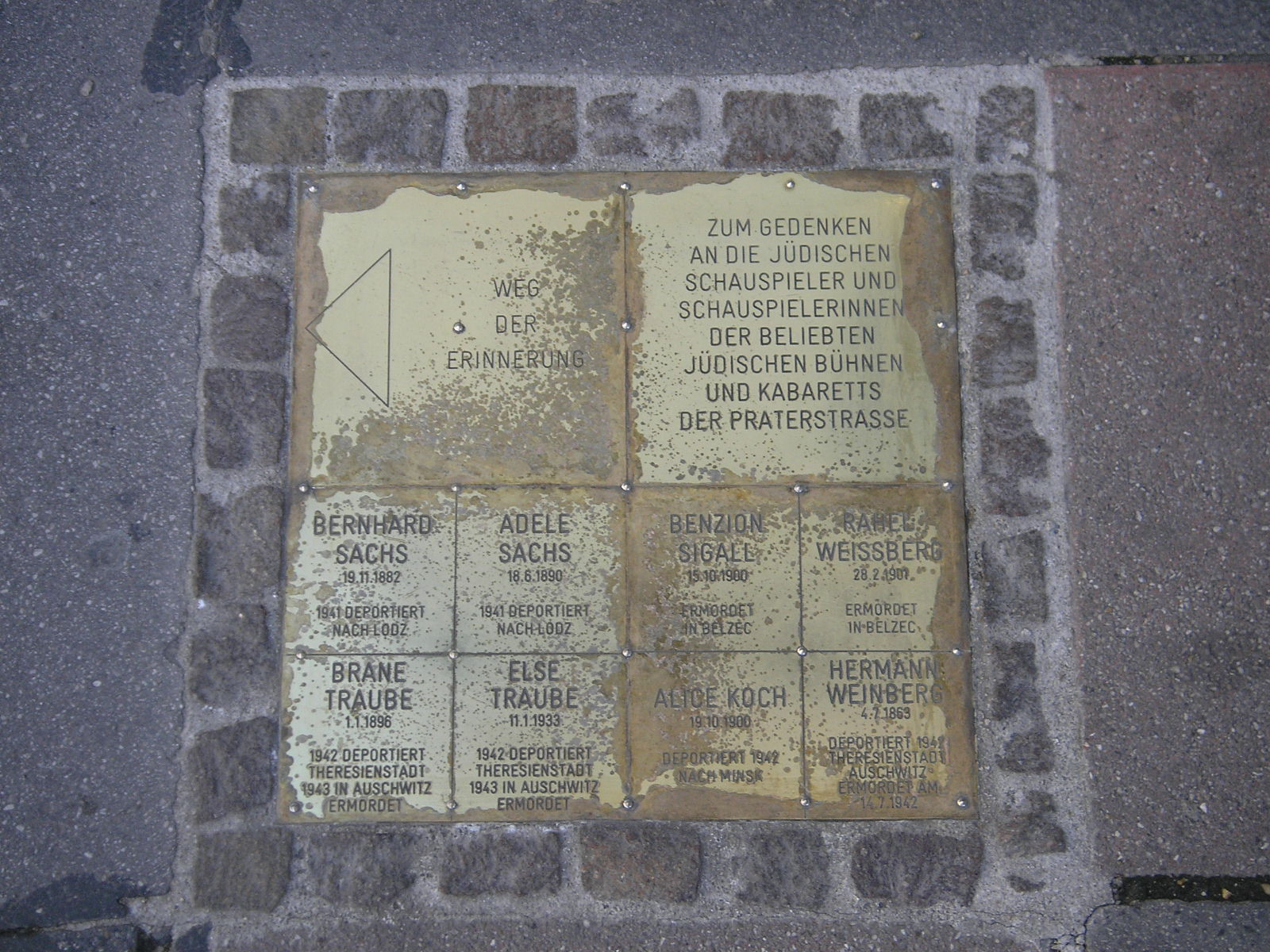
Plaques honouring the memory of murdered Jewish actors

After World War II, it took a long time for Austria to come to a clear position with regard to its part of the responsibility for the horrors of the "Third Reich". In the 1980s, a shift in thinking took place that led to the declaration on the part of the Austrian government in June 1991, in which Chancellor Vranitzky made the first explicit statement in parliament concerning the participation of Austrian citizens in the crimes of Nazi Germany.

Vienna's Jewish population numbered more than 201,000 before 1938. In 1946, just 4,000 Jews remained, many of whom emigrated in the following years. Meanwhile, the Jewish population in Germany actually grew as a result of emigration from Eastern Europe at this time. At the end of the 1990s, there were barely more than 7000 registered members of Vienna's Jewish community. Many of the Jews who live in Vienna today came to the city as refugees from Eastern Europe to begin a new life in the Austrian capital. Immigrants of Jewish origin from the lands of the former Soviet Union in particular have strengthened the ranks of Vienna's Jewish population. In 1992, a Sephardic Centre was officially opened in the city, while in 1994, the Psychosocial Centre Esra (Help) was established, and in 1999, the new school building of the Ronald S. Lauder Foundation opened in the Augarten. In 2000, the Judenplatz Holocaust Memorial, designed by Rachel Whiteread, was unveiled, and a Museum of Jewish history, life and religion was also opened at the Judenplatz.

In autumn 2008, the Zwi Perez Chajes school moved from the Castellezgasse to the Simon-Wiesenthal-Gasse next to the Messe Wien at the Prater. The school thus forms part of a complex including a Jewish kindergarten, primary school, and grammar school for around 600 children, and is located near the Hakoah Vienna sport club, which was re-opened in March 2008, an education centre, and an old people's home.

The 2001 census in Austria counted 8140 Jews in Austria, of which 6988 were living in Vienna. The Israelitische Kultusgemeinde Wien, however, believes that there are around 15,000 Jews in Austria; some sources speak of as many as 20,000.

Leopoldstadt continues to represent a centre of Jewish life in Vienna. The proportion of the population of Jewish religion is above average, at 3.1%. There are eight Ashkenazi and three Sephardic synagogues or prayer houses in this district of the city, seven Jewish educational institutions, as well as numerous kosher shops, bakeries and restaurants.

== Synagogues ==
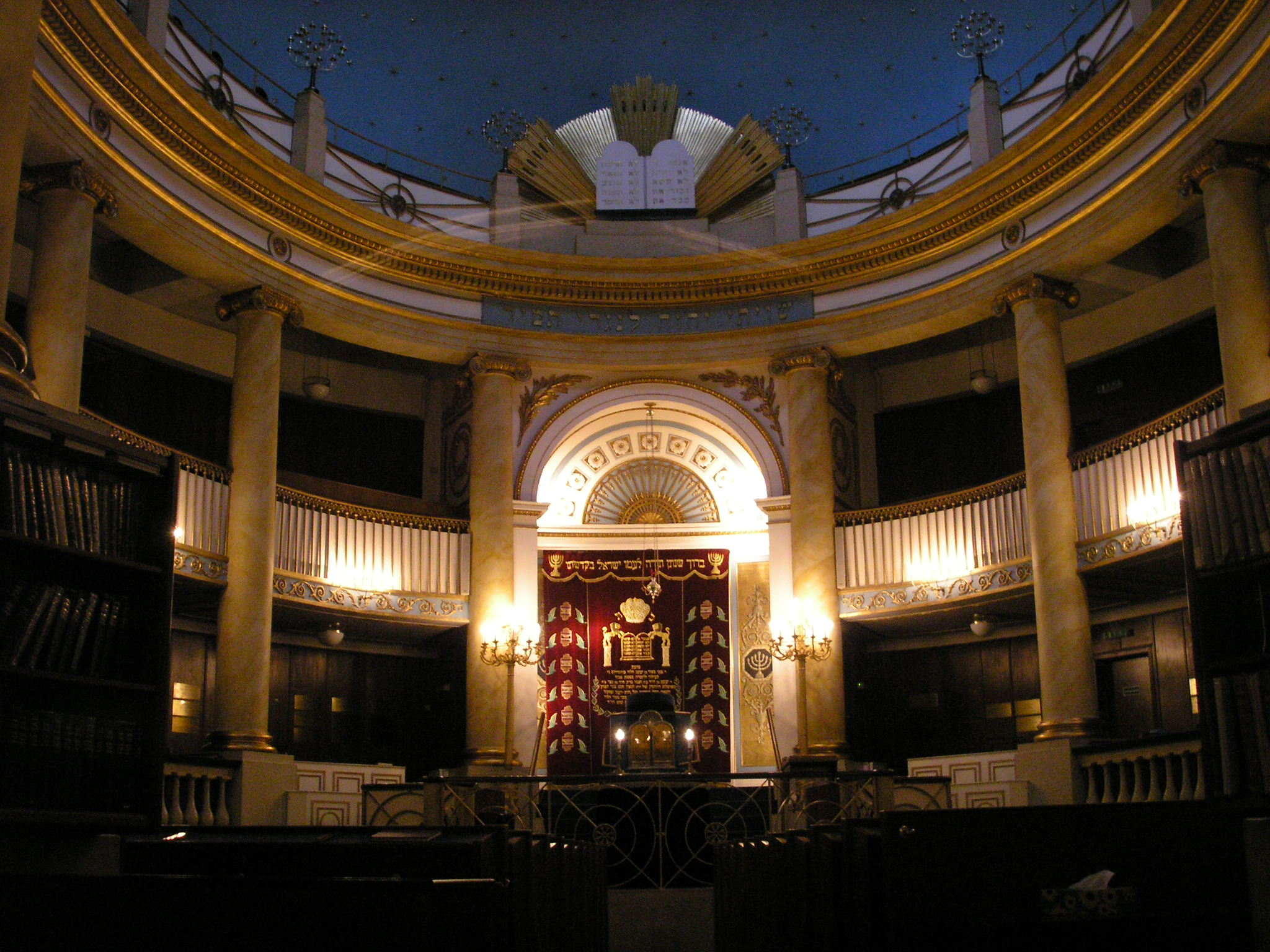
The interior of the Stadttempel

Over the centuries, 93 synagogues have been founded in Vienna. The Rabbinical Seminary Vienna was established in 1893 for the training of Rabbis, largely per the "Science of Judaism". The only synagogue to have survived the Kristallnacht pogrom is the Stadttempel. Some new synagogues and prayer rooms have since been established.

== See also ==
- Antisemitism
- Döbling Synagogue
- History of the Jews in Austria
- Israelitische Kultusgemeinde Wien
- Leopoldstadt, a play concerning the Viennese Jewish community by Tom Stoppard
- Unser Wien (Our Vienna), a book about the expropriation of Viennese Jewish businesses by the Nazis
