= Ida Jenbach =

Austrian playwright and screenwriter

Ida Jenbach (Miskolc, 4 June 1868 – Minsk Ghetto, between 1941 and 1943) was an Austrian playwright and screenwriter for German and Austrian cinema during the 1920s. She was one of the authors of the spirited farce Opera Ball that appeared at the Little Carnegie Playhouse in New York City in 1931. New York Times critic Mordaunt Hall praised this comedy as "cleverly acted by the principals." The Opera Ball (Opernredoute) was a German film that had "captions in English lettered on the scenes to keep those unfamiliar with German au courant of what is happening."

In 1926, Jenbach wrote the script to The Priest from Kirchfeld, based on Ludwig Anzengruber‘s popular German "folk play". The play bears a notable resemblance to The Atonement of Gosta Berling. Attacking the Catholic doctrine of celibacy for priests and the denial of burial for suicides, the play was and remains very controversial.

Jenbach also worked on the screenplay to Hugo Bettauer’s 1924 dystopian satire, Die Stadt ohne Juden ("The City without Jews"). This novel was prescient. It imagined a city that expelled the Jews and confiscated their wealth. It was meant to show the ridiculousness of anti-Semitism. It was Bettauer's most famous and best selling novel, and was translated into numerous languages. It was also his undoing. The novel angered the Nazis. A year later, Nazi party member Otto Rothstock murdered Bettauer. When the film version opened, members of the National Socialist party tossed stink bombs into the cinemas, and cinema owners often cut parts of the film out. This film was the first important role for German film star Hans Moser. In 1933, some in the German press said that this film speaks for itself as an indictment against Hitler.

During the Third Reich, Jenbach was sent to the Minsk Ghetto. She died either there or in a concentration camp nearby. Her date of death is unknown.

== Selected filmography ==
- Else of Erlenhof (1919)
- Oh, Dear Augustine (1922)
- Sons in Law (1926)
- The Priest from Kirchfeld (1926)
- The Field Marshal (1927)
- The Family without Morals (1927)
- The Opera Ball (1931)
- When the Soldiers (1931)

== In literature ==
- Geser, Guntram; Loacker, Armin, eds. (2000). Die Stadt ohne Juden. Edition Film und Text 3, 2. Wien: Verlag Filmarchiv Austria. p. 175. ISBN 3-901932-08-9.
- Weniger, Kay (2001). Das große Personenlexikon des Films. Die Schauspieler, Regisseure, Kameraleute, Produzenten, Komponisten, Drehbuchautoren, Filmarchitekten, Ausstatter, Kostümbildner, Cutter, Tontechniker, Maskenbildner und Special Effects Designer des 20. Jahrhunderts. Vol. 4: H – L. Botho Höfer – Richard Lester. Berlin: Schwarzkopf & Schwarzkopf. p. 218. ISBN 3-89602-340-3.
- Weniger, Kay (2011). 'Es wird im Leben dir mehr genommen als gegeben …'. Lexikon der aus Deutschland und Österreich emigrierten Filmschaffenden 1933 bis 1945. Eine Gesamtübersicht. Hamburg: ACABUS-Verlag. pp. 263 f. ISBN 978-3-86282-049-8.
