= Yareli Arizmendi =

Mexican actress, writer, and director

- Born: 1964 (age 60–61); Mexico City, Mexico
- Education: University of California, San Diego (BA, MFA)
- Occupation(s): Actress, writer, and director
- Years active: 1992-present

Yareli Arizmendi (born 1964) is a Mexican actress, writer, and director.

Born in Mexico City, Arizmendi went to high school in Kansas (Academy of Mt. St. Scholastica), then received a BA in Political Science and her MFA in Theatre from the graduate acting program at the University of California, San Diego. She played Rosaura in the film Like Water for Chocolate, written by Laura Esquivel and directed by Alfonso Arau. In 1991, Arizmendi married Sergio Arau.

== Career ==
Arizmendi played Rosaura in the film Like Water for Chocolate. She also co-wrote, produced, and played Lila Rodriguez in A Day Without a Mexican.

Her one-woman show Nostalgia Maldita: 1-900 Mexico was performed on a stairmaster. It was featured on the WXEL series Heritage.

Arizmendi has appeared on television in Six Feet Under, House, The Agency, 24, and Medium and on film in Don’t Let me Drown, AMERICA with Edward James Olmos, and Naco es Chido.

She worked with Luis Valdez and Teatro Campesino and toured with Teatro de la Esperanza to Nicaragua. She translated and staged Latin American plays, as well as developing bilingual in-schools programs with the Old Globe Theater.

In 1995, Arizmendi received the Princess Grace Foundation Statue Award for contribution to a field of performance art. She played Rosa in the 1996 film Gunfighter's Moon.

She has narrated the audiobook editions of several books, including American Dirt by Jeanine Cummins and Como agua para chocolate by Laura Esquivel.

== Family ==
Arizmendi is married to Sergio Arau whom she met on the set of Like Water for Chocolate.
