= Wal Ambrose =

Experimental archaeologist (1933–2024)

- Born: 1933
- Died: 9 January 2024 (aged 90–91)
- Other name: Wallace Raymond Ambrose
- Occupation: Archaeologist

Academic background
- Education: University of Auckland, UCL Institute of Archaeology

Wallace Raymond Ambrose, known as Wal, (1933 – 9 January 2024) was an archaeologist in New Zealand and Australia. Ambrose was one of the first conservators in Australia, and established the Conservation Section of the School of Pacific Studies at the Australian National University.

== Life ==
Ambrose was born in 1933, and grew up in Auckland, New Zealand. He earned a Diploma in Fine Arts, and then worked with Jack Golson at the University of Auckland, being employed as a technician in 1955. There Ambrose was involved in excavation, photography, and illustration, as well as in writing and editing papers. Golson was appointed as a Fellow in Prehistory at the Australian National University in 1961, and Ambrose followed two years later, as a research assistant. While Ambrose had studied geology and anthropology courses at undergraduate level during his time at Auckland, the credits he had earned were not recognised by the ANU, and he did not gain his bachelor's degree. He did earn, however, a Diploma of Archaeological Conservation at the Institute of Archaeology in London, spending two years in London with his wife and children.

Ambrose was one of the first conservators in Australia. He is known for establishing the Conservation Section of the School of Pacific Studies at the Australian National University. He remained at ANU until 1981.

Ambrose studied in the field in Australia and Papua New Guinea, at Kuk Swamp with Winifred Mumford, and Motupore, with Jim Allen. In 1970 he established the archaeology laboratory at the University of Papua New Guinea. He developed new techniques for preserving and freeze-drying wet wooden artefacts.

Ambrose retired in 1998. In 2006, he was awarded a Doctor of Letters by the ANU, on the basis of 42 published papers.

Ambrose died on 9 January 2024.

== Selected works ==
- Ambrose, Wal; Davis, F. (1960). Final Report on the Recording of Maori Rock Shelter Art at Benmore – via Heritage New Zealand.
- Allen, Melinda (1995). "A Community of Culture: The People and Prehistory of the Pacific. Matthew Spriggs, Douglas E. Yen, Wal Ambrose, Rhys Jones, Alan Thorne, and Ann Andrews, editors. Occasional Papers in Prehistory No. 21. Research School of Pacific Studies, Australian". American Antiquity. 60 (01): 160–161. doi:10.2307/282081. JSTOR 282081. Wikidata Q59235018.
- Dirk H. R. Spennemann; Wal R. Ambrose (1997). "Floating obsidian and its implications for the interpretation of Pacific prehistory". Antiquity. 71 (271): 188–193. doi:10.1017/s0003598x00084684. Wikidata Q59103298.
- Ambrose, Wallace Raymond (2002). "Roger Bird". Australian Archaeology. 54 (1): 52–52. doi:10.1080/03122417.2002.11682068. Wikidata Q112210408.
- Ambrose, Wal (30 December 2011). "Oceanic Tattooing and the Implied Lapita Ceramic Connection". Journal of Pacific Archaeology. 3 (1): 1–21. doi:10.70460/jpa.v3i1.73. ISSN 1179-4712.
- WAL AMBROSE; FIONA PETCHEY; PAMELA SWADLING; HARRY BERAN; ELIZABETH BONSHEK; KATHERINE SZABO; SIMON BICKLER; GLENN SUMMERHAYES (2012). "Engraved prehistoric Conus shell valuables from southeastern Papua New Guinea: their antiquity, motifs and distribution". Archaeology in Oceania. 47 (3): 113–132. doi:10.1002/j.1834-4453.2012.tb00124.x. Wikidata Q139123898.
- Summerhayes, Glenn Reginald; Jean Kennedy; Elizabeth Matisoo‐Smith; Herman Mandui; Wal Ambrose; Charlotte Allen; Reepmeyer, Christian; Robin Torrence; François Wadra (2014). "Lepong: A New Obsidian Source in the Admiralty Islands, Papua New Guinea". Geoarchaeology. 29 (3): 238–248. doi:10.1002/gea.21475. Wikidata Q139123916.
