= Gisela Werbezirk =

Austrian-Hungarian actress (1875–1956)

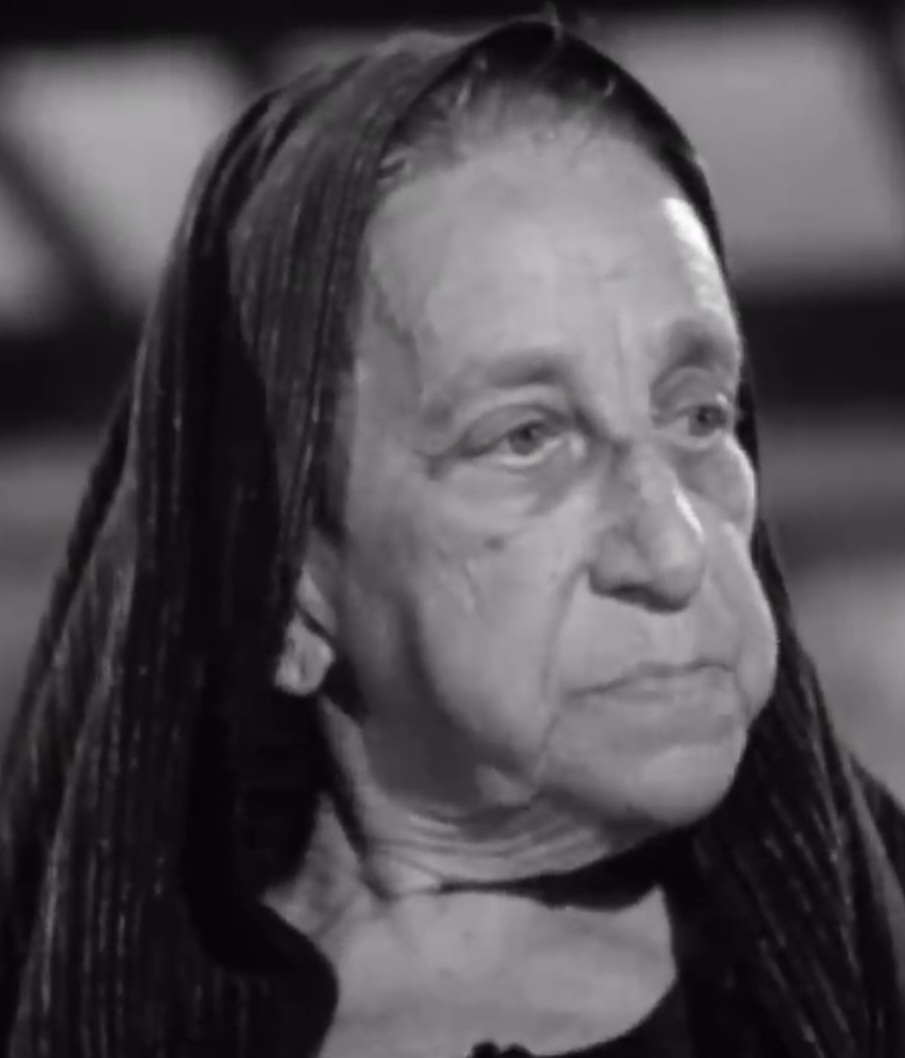
- Werbezirk in Bride of the Gorilla (1951)
- Born: Gisela Werbezirk; 8 April 1875; Pressburg (now Bratislava, Slovakia), Austria-Hungary
- Died: 15 April 1956 (aged 81); Hollywood, California, US
- Occupation: Actress
- Years active: 1890–1951
- Spouse: Johann Piffl
- Children: 1

Gisela Werbezirk (also spelled Werbisek, 8 April 1875 – 15 April 1956) was an Austrian-Hungarian actress. For most of her career, she performed across theaters in Europe, notably in Vienna and Berlin, and at one time was compared to stage actress Marie Dressler. Upon the invasion of Austria shortly before the onset of World War II, she emigrated with her family to America as a Jewish refugee to escape Nazi persecution. She arrived in New York in late 1938 and performed on Broadway before later having minor roles in Hollywood films. She died in 1956 due to kidney failure.

== Career ==
=== Early life ===
Werbezirk was born in Pressburg (now Bratislava, Slovakia) in 1875 to a Jewish family. Before becoming a film actress, she began her career as a stage actress in Vienna, where she played the part of a 35-year-old "old" woman, despite being only 15 years old at the time.

=== Stage career ===
Werbezirk became well known as a stage actress for over 35 years in Europe and was described by California's The Valley Times in 1946 as having been "Europe's foremost comedienne". Across Europe, she was compared to stage actress Marie Dressler. She was best known in Vienna, where she appeared on stage and was popular among theater-goers. She was a prominent actress in Jewish theaters in Leopoldstadt, where she gained recognition for playing strong widows in comedic productions. Her roles were often compared to the stereotype of the "Yiddishe mama", a controlling mother who dotes on her son.

Like many Jewish women in Vienna, Werbezirk had immigrated from Eastern Europe with the dream of becoming a stage actress, and she received praise from critics for her humor and acting ability. However, her appearance was often criticized, with male Jewish critics suggesting that she was too unattractive to play non-Jewish roles convincingly. Despite this, Werbezirk remained a respected and accomplished actress in the Jewish theater scene. In 1921, she was described by The Bomb Austrian newspaper as being "probably the strongest comic force that can currently be seen on a Viennese stage". In late 1923, she landed one of her most successful roles in the play "Frau Breier aus Gaya," where she played the part of Sali Breier, a successful poultry woman.

Among other European cities she toured was Berlin, from where she returned to Vienna in 1929 following a long stay. In 1936, she had a lead role in the play Mizzi in Vienna's Deutsches Volkstheater, where she performed over 100 times across three different Vienna theaters alongside an ensemble cast. She claimed to have performed in Abie's Irish Rose across cities in Europe over 1,000 times, during which time she was reportedly the highest paid German-speaking actress.

=== Career in America ===
Having emigrated to America in late 1938, Werbezirk expected she would find work straight away due to her popularity in Europe, however she was unheard of in America and was mocked due to her name. During her earlier years, she performed on Broadway and her debut performance was the title role in a Yiddish version of Queen Mother, in New York's National Theatre. Another earlier role was a major part in Gray Farm, despite only having a brief run.

She also performed in film and was praised for her role as an elderly German lady in the 1943 film Women in Bondage, with The Commercial Appeal reporter Lillard M'Gee stating that she gave "a good account[ing] of herself". She is believed to have played around 150 roles, typically as an older lady, although also had many minor film roles.

== Personal life ==
Werbezirk was Jewish and married to Johann Piffl, who also acted as her manager. Her husband was the nephew of Friedrich Gustav Piffl, Cardinal of the Roman Catholic Church and Archbishop of Vienna. Piffl was described by one reporter as being a "ponderously fat, talkative man". Together they had a son, Heinrich Piffl, who later changed his name to Henry Peever in America.

=== Emigration to America ===
After Germany invaded Austria before the outbreak of World War II, Werbezirk and her family fled to Italy three days later, helped by friends and family. Her family name was well-known and they had traveled to Italy many times before, making it possible for them to escape across the border. Her son Henry was high on the Gestapo's "black list" for his anti-Nazi activities, as well as being a Jew who fought for the Czech army. He was arrested and deported to Germany, but managed to escape with his family to France and then London. Werbezirk reportedly tried to commit suicide on six occasions following the invasion of Austria.

From London, they boarded the SS Île de France as refugees bound for America in late 1938, where she hoped they would be safe from Nazi persecution. Once in America, she was taunted over her name, ultimately opting to drop the "Piffl". While the name Piffl is honorable in Austria, she was initially unaware it had a less desirable English-language meaning. In an interview in 1946, she claimed to receive up to 20 prank calls a day about her name, some with false news about her son, such as that he had been involved in an accident. Despite mistaking a friend for a prank caller, she did not want to unlist her phone number as she feared losing contact with friends. Werbezirk ultimately gained American citizenship and lived the rest of her life in the United States.

== Death ==
She died at her home of kidney failure on 15 April 1956, at the age of 81.

== Partial filmography ==
=== Film ===
- Kri-Kri, the Duchess of Tarabac (1920)
- The City Without Jews as Kathi (1924)
- Das Kabinett des Dr. Larifari as Hedda Mutz-Kahla, Schriftstellerin (1930)
- When Love Sets the Fashion as Mrs. Kelerman, Budapest (1932)
- The Hunchback of Notre Dame (Uncredited) (1939)
- Dr. Ehrlich's Magic Bullet (Uncredited) (1940)
- Girls Under 21 as Mrs. Krupnik (1940)
- So Ends Our Night as The Harpy - Ruth's Roommate (1941)
- That Uncertain Feeling (Uncredited) (1941)
- Tough As They Come as Mrs. Polashek (1942)
- Chetniks! The Fighting Guerrillas (Uncredited) (1943)
- Above Suspicion (Uncredited) (1943)
- Women in Bondage as Rita Rumann (1943)
- Phantom Lady (Uncredited) (1944)
- The Hairy Ape (Uncredited) (1944)
- The Seventh Cross (Uncredited) (1944)
- Wonder Man as Mrs. Schmidt (1945)
- The Lost Weekend as (Uncredited) (1945)
- A Scandal in Paris as Aunt Ernestine (1946)
- The Dark Corner as Mrs Schwartz (1946)
- The Brasher Doubloon (Uncredited) (1947)
- Golden Earrings as (Uncredited) (1947)
- Wallflower (Uncredited) (1947)
- The Great Sinner as (Uncredited) (1949)
- Bride of the Gorilla as Al-Long (1951)

=== Television ===
- General Electric Theater (1 episode) (1953)
