= Suzanne Friedline =

American actress

- Born: Jacksonville, Florida, U.S.
- Occupation(s): Actress, voice artist
- Years active: 1995–present
- Spouse: Mark Ferber (2001–2010; his death)
- Children: 1
- Website: www.suzannefriedline.com

Suzanne Friedline is an American actress and voice artist. She has appeared in numerous movies and TV series, as well as in theater dramas.

== Early life ==
Friedline was born in Jacksonville, Florida, and is the daughter of actress Dolores Friedline. Suzanne graduated from the Florida State University. She was in one of the first group of college theatre students to study at the prestigious Moscow Art Theatre in Russia in 1990 under Oleg Tabakov. She received acting training from the Florida State University, Moscow Art Theatre, and in The Goodman School of Drama.

== Career ==
Friedline has appeared in a number of movies and TV series, and has provided voice in more than forty television series and movies. She generally provides additional voices and sometimes also voices characters. Friedline has also appeared in numerous stage plays. Her most recent stage appearances include in A Christmas Story at the Actors Theatre of Louisville, and in the musical Makin' Hay, which was staged in the Actors' Co-op Hollywood. Friedline has appeared in many other plays staged in the Actors' Co-op Theatre, including the play Crime and Punishment, as she is its member since 1998. Among her screen appearances, she most recently appeared with a guest appearances in the TV series Desperate Housewives, and in the series CSI: Crime Scene Investigation. Friedline's film appearances include in A Day Without a Mexican and Murderous Camouflage. She has provided voice in several films, including Terminator Salvation, Mr Woodcock, Black Irish, and Superman II. Friedline has provided voice in countless TV series and television movies, including in Generation Gap, Shark Swarm, Avenging Angel, and Anne Frank: The Whole Story. Friedline owns a production company named Hey Suz Productions.

== Personal life ==
Friedline married Mark Ferber in March 10, 2001. Suzanne gave birth to a son, Daniel Ferber, in 2004. Mark Ferber died on March 14, 2010.

== Film and television show appearances ==
- Dropping the Soap (2017) as Shea Butterfield
- Keep Dreaming (TV movie) (2009) as Tiffany
- Men in White (short movie) (2007) as CMBC Host
- A Day Without a Mexican (2004) as Vicki Martin
- Murderous Camouflage (2002) as Hot Butt
- Anne Frank: The Whole Story (Miniseries) (2001) as Bep Voskuijl (voice)
- NewsBreak (2000) as TV reporter
- Cricket & Potatoes (short movie) (1999) as Beauty Queen
