= Oh, Dear Augustine =

1922 film

- Directed by: Hans Karl Breslauer
- Written by: H.K. Breslauer; Ida Jenbach
- Starring: Willi Forst
- Cinematography: Oliver Turchanyi
- Music by: Edmund Eysler
- Production company: Mondial-Film
- Release date: 29 December 1922
- Running time: 100 minutes
- Country: Austria
- Languages: Silent; German intertitles

Oh, Dear Augustine (German: Oh, du lieber Augustin) is a 1922 Austrian silent film directed by Hans Karl Breslauer and starring Willi Forst. It is titled after the popular Viennese song "Oh du lieber Augustin".

== Cast ==
- Anny Miletty
- Mizzi Griebl
- Willi Forst
- Hans Effenberger
- Franz Meinau
- Alice Grobois
- Amandus Grohmann
- Willy Czapp
- Franz König

== Bibliography ==
- Reimer, Robert C.; Reimer, Carol J. (2010). The A to Z of German Cinema. Lanham, MD: Scarecrow Press. ISBN 978-0-8108-7611-8.
- Nelmes, Jill; Selbo, Jule, eds. (2015). Women Screenwriters: An International Guide. Basingstoke: Palgrave Macmillan. ISBN 978-1-137-31236-5.
- Von Dassanowsky, Robert (2005). Austrian Cinema: A History. Jefferson, NC: McFarland. ISBN 978-1-4766-2147-0.
