= Possessor (album) =

Studio album by Rusty Eye
- Released: June 6, 2009
- Recorded: February 2009 - April 2009 at Temple Studios in Chatsworth, California
- Genre: Heavy metal; speed metal; progressive metal
- Length: 49:04
- Label: Epoché Records
- Producer: Julieta Randall

Professional ratings
Review scores
Source	Rating
Blabbermouth	7/10 stars
About.com	3.5/5 stars
Blistering	7.5/10 stars
Metal Underground	3/5 stars
Thrash Hits	4.5/6 stars

Possessor is the third studio album by American heavy metal band Rusty Eye. The album was released on June 6, 2009, through the band’s own Epoché Records. It was recorded at Raymond Herrera and B-Real's Temple Studios in Chatsworth, California. It was mixed by Jeremy Blair, and included collaborations by horror film composer Claudio Simonetti on "Mondo Cane" and "Wings of a Demon"; producer and guitarist/keyboardist Waldemar Sorychta on "Somnambulist Possession" and "Mandragora Screams"; and vocalist Alex Mitchell on "The Serial Kind". The album's cover was illustrated by artist Joe Petagno.

== Release ==
It has been released on three formats, including a limited edition vinyl CD (limited to 1000), a white CD in a black jacket and a red cassette tape (limited to 100).
