= Bride of the Gorilla =

1951 film by Curt Siodmak

- Film poster
- Directed by: Curt Siodmak
- Written by: Curt Siodmak
- Produced by: Jack Broder; Edward Leven
- Starring: Barbara Payton; Lon Chaney Jr. Raymond Burr; Tom Conway
- Cinematography: Charles Van Enger
- Edited by: Francis D. Lyon
- Music by: Raoul Kraushaar; Mort Glickman
- Distributed by: Jack Broder Productions Inc.
- Release date: October 24, 1951
- Running time: 70 minutes
- Country: United States
- Language: English

Bride of the Gorilla is a 1951 horror B-movie film written and directed by Curt Siodmak and starring Raymond Burr, Lon Chaney Jr., Barbara Payton and Tom Conway.

== Plot ==
Deep in the Latin American jungles, plantation manager Barney Chavez kills his elderly employer, who is married to the beautiful Dina Van Gelder. Old native witch Al-Long witnesses the murder and places a curse on Barney, who transforms into a rampaging gorilla-like beast each night. Superstitious police commissioner Taro investigates the plantation owner's death and a rash of strange animal killings. He interviews farmers who have seen the bloodthirsty animal, which they identify as Sukara, a mythical jungle demon resembling a gorilla.

Dina is also becoming suspicious of Barney, who seems to be more in love with the jungle than he is with her. She follows him one night into the jungle but is attacked by the feral Barney. Taro and his friend Dr. Viet follow her screams in the jungle and shoot Barney. Before he dies, Barney peers into his reflection from a pond and sees "sukara" staring back at him.

== Cast ==
- Raymond Burr as Barney Chavez
- Barbara Payton as Dina Van Gelder
- Lon Chaney Jr. as Police Commissioner Taro (credited as Lon Chaney)
- Tom Conway as Dr. Viet
- Gisela Werbisek as Al-Long (credited as Giselle Werbisek)
- Carol Varga as Larina
- Paul Cavanagh as Klaas Van Gelder
- Paul Maxey as Van Heusen
- Woody Strode as Nedo (Policeman)
- Felippa Rock as Stella Van Heusen
- Moyna Macgill as Mrs. Van Heusen
- Steve Calvert as Gorilla (uncredited)

== Production ==
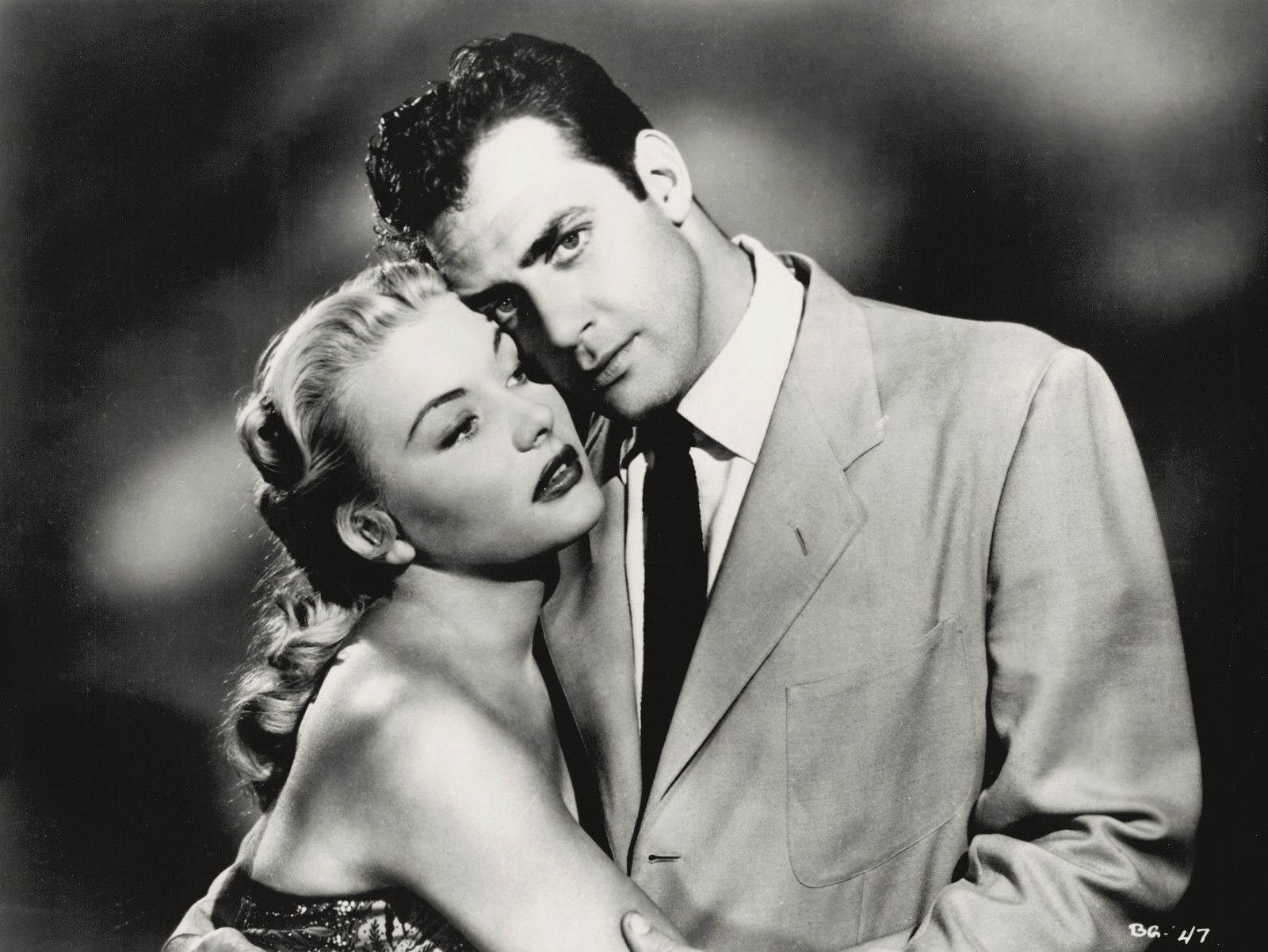
Raymond Burr and Barbara Payton

The film's working title was The Face in the Water.

Writer and director Curt Siodmak considered switching the roles of Lon Chaney Jr. and Raymond Burr, but because of Chaney's deteriorating appearance, the idea was dropped.

The film was shot in 10 days.

== Reception ==
Dennis Schwartz in a modern review said, "Siodmak’s serious manner of storytelling and stagy presentation never reaches the potential camp fun this mindless film could have been if it just let itself go ape. Though far from being one of the worst films ever, it can only settle for mediocrity as a magical film where the magic just didn’t work."

== See also ==
- Sisimito
- List of films in the public domain in the United States
