= The City Without Jews =

1924 film by Hans Karl Breslauer

Die Stadt ohne Juden
- Directed by: Hans Karl Breslauer
- Written by: H. K. Breslauer; Ida Jenbach
- Based on: Die Stadt ohne Juden by Hugo Bettauer
- Produced by: Walterskirchen und Bittner
- Starring: Johannes Riemann; Eugen Neufeld; Hans Moser; Anny Milety
- Cinematography: Hugo Eywo
- Music by: Gerhard Gruber (new arrangement 2000); Olga Neuwirth (new arrangement 2017)
- Release date: 25 July 1924
- Running time: 80 minutes
- Country: Austria
- Language: German

The City Without Jews (German: Die Stadt ohne Juden) is a 1924 Austrian Expressionist film by Hans Karl Breslauer, based on the novel of the same title by Hugo Bettauer. The film is one of the few surviving Expressionist films from Austria and has therefore been well researched. The film was first shown on 25 July 1924 in Vienna.

In his novel, published in 1922, Hugo Bettauer succeeded in creating a relatively accurate allegorical vision of the near future. Although the book was intended for entertainment and as a satirical response to the primitive antisemitism of the 1920s, it immediately became Bettauer's most popular work. It was translated into several languages, and sold over a quarter of a million copies. Shortly after the premiere of the film Hugo Bettauer was murdered by Otto Rothstock, a former member of the Nazi Party, who was lionized by the antisemitic Austrian masses and was released less than two years after having been committed to a psychiatric institution.

== Plot ==
The City Without Jews (1924)

In Austria the Christian Social Party comes to power, and the new Chancellor Dr. Schwerdtfeger, a fanatical antisemite, sees his people as being ruled by the Jews. He, therefore, has a law passed by the National Assembly forcing all Jews to emigrate by the end of the year. The law is enthusiastically received by the non-Jewish population, and the Jews leave the country. Cultural life later becomes impoverished, in the theatres only plays by Ludwig Ganghofer and Ludwig Anzengruber are still performed. Many cafes are empty, or are converted into beer halls selling sausages. After an initial upturn, the economy declines, as business has greatly diminished, and has moved to other cities, such as Prague and Budapest. Inflation and unemployment are consistently depicted.

The political characters of the book (although not of the film, to avoid difficulties with censorship) are delineated in such a way as to be identifiable with real politicians of the period; Bundeskanzler Schwerdtfeger, for example, is based on Ignaz Seipel. Besides the political action, the film also notes the love relationship between Lotte (Anny Milety), a typical Viennese girl (Wiener Mädel) and the daughter of a member of the National Assembly who voted for the banishment of the Jews, and the Jewish artist Leo Strakosch (Johannes Riemann).

Towards the end of the film, the National Assembly resolves to bring the Jews back again. However, to achieve the necessary two-thirds majority, Lotte and Leo, who have already illegally returned to Austria with forged papers identifying him as a French painter, have to remove the antisemitic parliamentary representative Bernard (played by Hans Moser), which they do by getting him drunk. He is committed to a psychiatric institution represented in Expressionist scenery, where in a claustrophobic and asymmetrically painted cell, he sees himself threatened by Stars of David.

This sequence also represents the divergence of the film from the book, as the action of the film is revealed as a dream of the antisemitic Councillor Bernard. This turn of events was described in the original film program as,"In this moment of the highest distress Councillor Bernard awakes from his dream, finds himself in the tavern at a very late hour and says to the baffled Volbert; Thank God that stupid dream is over—we are all just people and we don't want hate—we want life—we want to live together in peace.'"

== Background ==
The film was made in 1924, about two years after the publication of Bettauer's novel. It differs from the book in several ways: for example, the city in the film is called "Utopia", instead of "Vienna". The film also has a conciliatory happy ending, which is not only the exact opposite of the message of the book, but also represents a change of direction within the film itself, which is thus revealed as the dream of an antisemite who at last comes to the realization that the Jews are a "necessary evil". The reason for these deviations from the original was to reduce the controversial political impact of the content.

The film was Hans Moser's second cinematic role. The female lead was played, as so often in Breslauer's films, by Anny (or Anna) Milety, whom he later married (in 1925). The well-known Jewish actors Gisela Werbisek (billed as "Werbezirk") and Armin Berg appeared only in minor roles, as Kathi the cook and Isidor the commissionaire. The Expressionist backdrops and decor that characterise some scenes were the work of Julius von Borsody.

Other cast members were Eugen Neufeld (Bundeskanzler Dr. Schwerdtfeger), Karl Thema (Cllr. Linder), Ferdinand Mayerhofer (Cllr. Volbert), Mizzi Griebl (Volbert's wife) and Hans Effenberger (Alois Carroni).

== Performance history ==
The premiere took place on 25 July 1924 in Vienna, although there were still technical problems with the film. Bettauer and Breslauer, the director, fell out entirely, and Bettauer later refused to acknowledge any connection between the film and his book. The technically inferior prints of the film were often manually cut and shortened by the cinema owners themselves. Nevertheless, the cinema auditoriums were often full, not only in Austria but also in Berlin (premiere 1926) and New York (premiere 1928, where it was shown as The City Without Jews). It was very clear that the success of the film was not as great as that of the book. There were sometimes disturbances at performances: National Socialists often threw stinkbombs into the cinemas; in Linz the film was banned.

A campaign of vilification against Bettauer was instigated, partly because of this film and partly because of his other activities. In the spring of 1925 he was murdered by a Nazi Party member, Otto Rothstock, who was hailed as a hero and despite being found guilty of murder, was sent to a mental hospital and, after 18 months, set free. A fair amount of money was collected from the general public for him.

In 1933, the film was shown commercially for the last time, again causing a stir, when it was screened in the Amsterdam theatre Carré as a protest against Hitler's Germany. This copy of the film is presumably the same as the one discovered in 1991 in the Nederlands Filmmuseum. It was on a cellulose nitrate base and on the point of disintegration, as well as being incomplete. The German Bundesarchiv in Coblenz therefore made an "emergency copy", which was then reconstructed on behalf of the Filmarchiv Austria (Austrian Film Archive) by the company HS-ART Digital Service of Graz using the "DIAMANT" software developed by Joanneum Research; faded parts were then re-colored. In October 2008, the film was made available on a portable medium for the first time as part of the DVD series Der österreichische Film.

In 2015, a copy of the whole film in excellent condition was found in a flea market in Paris. The Austrian Film Archive organized a crowd-funding campaign to save the film to which more than 700 people contributed more than €86,000 (£72,000; $107,000). This full version of the film was digitally restored and re-released in 2018.

== Critical reaction ==
In many places the film follows the original book almost word for word, which makes the Utopian ending even more obviously an expression of appeasement. In the end the surprised audience learns that the entire dramatic action only took place in a dream, and thus never really happened. The on-screen happy ending, dictated by compromise, not only negates the meaning of Bettauer's book but also the very real antisemitism that it reflects. Instead it documents a by no means unthinkable and in no way dreamlike reality [...] This surprising turn of the plot, deviating totally from the literary original, which simplifies the action as the content of a dream, cannot merely be regarded as a simple dramatic exigency, but as a prime example of the Austrian soul's ability to repress. This naïve and perhaps crude experiment from 1924 can be taken as a forerunner of what was generally practiced after World War II in the country ohne Eigenschaften (Note: An allusion to Robert Musil's novel Der Mann ohne Eigenschaften (English translations as The Man Without Qualities).)

— Thomas Ballhausen, Günter Krenn, 2006

== See also ==
- A Day Without a Mexican, a 2004 film on the effects of the sudden disappearance of all Mexican immigrants on American life
- Berlin Without Jews, a 1925 novel by Arthur Landsberger, likely inspired by Hugo Bettauer's original 1922 novel.

== Bibliography ==
- Walter Fritz und Josef Schuchnig (eds.), 1991: Die Stadt ohne Juden. Materialien zum Film. Österreichisches Filmarchiv, Vienna, (Schriftenreihe des Österreichischen Filmarchivs; Folge 26).
- Guntram Geser und Armin Loacker (eds.), 2000: Die Stadt ohne Juden. Filmarchiv Austria, Vienna (Reihe Edition Film und Text. 3.) ISBN 978-3-901932-08-3.
