= Else of Erlenhof =

- Directed by: Fritz Kortner
- Written by: Ida Jenbach
- Starring: Fritz Kortner
- Production company: Leyka-Film
- Release date: 26 December 1919
- Country: Austria
- Languages: Silent; German intertitles

Else of Erlenhof (German: Else von Erlenhof) is a 1919 Austrian silent drama film directed by and starring Fritz Kortner.

== Cast ==
- Poldi Müller
- Fritz Kortner
- Rudolf Danegger

== Bibliography ==
- Bock, Hans-Michael & Bergfelder, Tim. The Concise CineGraph. Encyclopedia of German Cinema. Berghahn Books, 2009.
