= The Family without Morals =

1927 film directed by Max Neufeld

- Hans Moser in a scene
- Directed by: Max Neufeld
- Written by: Felix Dörmann (play); Ida Jenbach; Max Neufeld
- Produced by: Hugo Engel
- Starring: Anna Kallina; Colette Brettel; Carmen Cartellieri
- Cinematography: Hans Theyer
- Production company: Hugo Engel-Filmgesellschaft
- Release date: 18 January 1927
- Running time: 120 minutes
- Country: Austria
- Languages: Silent; German intertitles

The Family without Morals (German: Die Familie ohne Moral) is a 1927 Austrian silent film directed by Max Neufeld and starring Anna Kallina, Colette Brettel, and Carmen Cartellieri.

The film's sets were designed by art directors Alfred Kunz and Franz Meschkan.

== Cast ==
- Anna Kallina as Frau Wallner
- Colette Brettel as Lux
- Carmen Cartellieri as Sophie
- Daisy Holms as Marie
- Mizzi Griebl as Witwe Brandl
- Paul Hartmann as Vinzenz
- Fred Louis Lerch as Toni
- Hermann Thimig as Hans Wengl
- Otto Schmöle as Josef Meisl
- Eugen Neufeld as Peter Ellinger
- Hans Moser as Dienstmann
- Rudi Merstallinger as Rikkolo
- Gretl Petrovits as Resi
- Lina Frank as Frau Binder

== Bibliography ==
- Parish, James Robert (1977). Film Actors Guide: Western Europe. Metuchen, NJ: Scarecrow Press. ISBN 978-0-8108-1044-0.
