= Anny Miletty =

Austrian actress

- Born: 20 March 1898; Vienna, Austro-Hungarian Empire
- Died: 19 November 1948 (aged 50); Mondsee, Austria
- Other names: Anny Milety; Anna Milety
- Occupation: Actress
- Years active: 1921-1924 (film)
- Spouse: Hans Karl Breslauer (m. 1925)

Anny Miletty (1898–1948) was an Austrian film actress of the silent era, best known for her role in the 1924 film The City Without Jews. In 1925 she married the film director Hans Karl Breslauer and ended her film career.

== Selected filmography ==
- Oh, Dear Augustine (1922)
- The House of Molitor (1922)
- The City Without Jews (1924)

== Bibliography ==
- Robert Von Dassanowsky. Austrian Cinema: A History. McFarland, 2005.
