= Sisimito =

Central American mythical monster

In Belizean and Honduran folklore, the Sisimito (alternatively called Sisimite, Sisimita, Sismidu, Súkara, and Itacayo) is an alleged upright, bipedal, gorilla-like creature that possesses a head much like a human, with long hair or fur covering its body. It is also referred to as "the Mexican Bigfoot", though it is also known in the neighboring countries of Guatemala and Nicaragua.

== Description ==
The Sisimito is said to be a humanoid creature covered in black or dark brown fur. It is described as having ape-like facial features, possessing four fingers on each hand with no thumbs, lacking knees, and standing taller than an average person upon backward-facing feet, a trait also attributed to the Mapinguari of Brazil. Its name differs between ethnic groups; for example, the Garifuna call it Sismidu. The name has no true English translation and is believed to have come from the Nahuatl word, Tzitzimitl.

=== Honduras ===
According to Honduran legends, it is believed that the Sisimito targets and kidnaps human women. It is also thought that when a woman falls in love with a Sisimito, the Sisimito will claim her as his own, and she will never be seen again.

The Honduran explorer and historian, Jesús Aguilar Paz (1895-1974), said that the Sisimito lives in the highest part of the Honduran mountains, more specifically in the inaccessible caverns found there. Aguilar also explains that the Sisimito feeds on the wild berries from the mountains and that it is not a carnivorous being or a hunter; however, it usually goes down to the village to kidnap women to take them to their cave. The union of a Sisimito and a human is believed to produce ape men.

=== Belize ===
In Belizean legend, the Sisimito is said to also feast on humans. Furthermore, in Belizean societies, the belief is:

"If you are a man and you look at him in the eyes (and escaped), you will die within a month. If you are a woman and you look at him in the eyes (and escaped), your life will be prolonged."

Tales of the Sisimito were shared in camps by mahogany cutters in the past and continue to be told in villages such as Ranchito and Hill Bank. The Sisimito is said to live in high forest areas. Further, it is thought to reside in caves and on rocky land. In the Toledo District, forest areas have decreased over the years because of agricultural development, and the Ketchi believe that Tzultacah, the thunder deities whom they believe protect them from wild animals, have pulled the Sisimito back into the few densely jungled areas remaining, so it is rarely seen today.

The Sisimito diet is believed to consist of raw meat and fruits, and when feasting on human beings, it will tear the body into several pieces before devouring it. Though fierce and malevolent towards humans, it is afraid of water and dogs and will avoid them at all costs. The Sisimito is believed to often assume human form in order to lure people out of villages with the purpose of killing them. Because of this, the Sisimito is sometimes confused with Xtabay or La Llorona.

On Sundays and religious holidays, such as Good Friday, the Sisimito is believed to prey on hunters and other people who stray into the bushes. It follows human footprints, with its main purpose being either to kill its victims or to rip off their thumbs; the Sisimito is also believed to attack men who are killing animals needlessly or destroying the forest.

== Outsmarting the Sisimito ==
According to local beliefs, the Sisimito can be outsmarted due to its lack of intelligence, allowing its victim to escape being pursued.

1. If one dances in a circle, the Sisimito will try to follow them. However, due to its backward-facing feet, the Sisimito will trip and fall.
2. Having a dog by one's side is said to discourage the Sisimito from approaching.
3. The Sisimito is said to be afraid of large bodies of water such as rivers or lakes.
4. Making a path of footprints leading into a bush will cause the Sisimito to lose track of its prey and begin following its own tracks, mistaking them for someone else's.
5. The ultimate way to get rid of the Sisimito is to set fire to his long hair.

== In popular culture ==
The Sisimito is featured in the 1951 B-movie Bride of the Gorilla, directed by Curt Siodmak. The film refers to the creature under one of its many regional names, the súkara. In this film, an Amazonian witch curses a European landowner to turn into the súkara whenever he enters the jungle.

Belize writer Henry Anderson has written several adventure novels set in his home country; they are known as the Sisimito series.

In the 2018 video game Shadow of the Tomb Raider, the Sisimito is referenced in a collectible document discovered by the protagonist, Lara Croft, within the Peruvian jungle.

== See also ==
- Bigfoot
- Bride of the Gorilla
- La Llorona
- Mapinguari
- Nagual
- Xtabay
