= The House of Molitor =

1922 film

- Directed by: Hans Karl Breslauer
- Written by: Lajos Bíró; H.K. Breslauer
- Starring: Alfred Abel; Anny Miletty; Magda Unger
- Cinematography: Oliver Turchanyi
- Production company: Mondial-Film
- Release date: 1 April 1922
- Country: Austria
- Languages: Silent; German intertitles

The House of Molitor (German: Das Haus Molitor) is a 1922 Austrian silent film directed by Hans Karl Breslauer and starring Alfred Abel, Anny Miletty and Magda Unger.

== Cast ==
- Alfred Abel as Molitor
- Anny Miletty
- Magda Unger
- Hans Effenberger
- Hela Lukacz
- Eugen Preiß
- Pauline Schweighofer
- Willy Czapp
- Oliver Turchanyi

== Bibliography ==
- Elisabeth Büttner & Christian Dewald. Das tägliche Brennen: eine Geschichte des österreichischen Films von den Anfängen bis 1945, Volume 1. Residenz, 2002.
