= Mizzi Griebl =

Austrian actress (1872–1952)

- Born: Maria Griebl; 27 February 1872; Vienna, Austria-Hungary
- Died: 8 June 1952 (aged 80); Vienna, Austria
- Other name: Mizi Griebl
- Occupation: Actress
- Years active: 1890-1946

Mizzi Griebl (27 February 1872 – 8 June 1952) was an Austrian stage and film actress. She appeared in a number of supporting roles during the silent and early sound era.

== Selected filmography ==
- Oh, Dear Augustine (1922)
- Fatme's Rescue (1922)
- The Iron King (1923)
- The City Without Jews (1924)
- The Family without Morals (1927)
- What Price Love? (1929)
- Devotion (1929)
- The Uncle from Sumatra (1930)
- General Babka (1930)
- Immortal Melodies (1935)
- Shadows of the Past (1936)
- Hannerl and Her Lovers (1936)

== Bibliography ==
- Rogowski, Christian. The Many Faces of Weimar Cinema: Rediscovering Germany's Filmic Legacy. Camden House, 2010.
