= Rusty Eye =

American heavy metal band

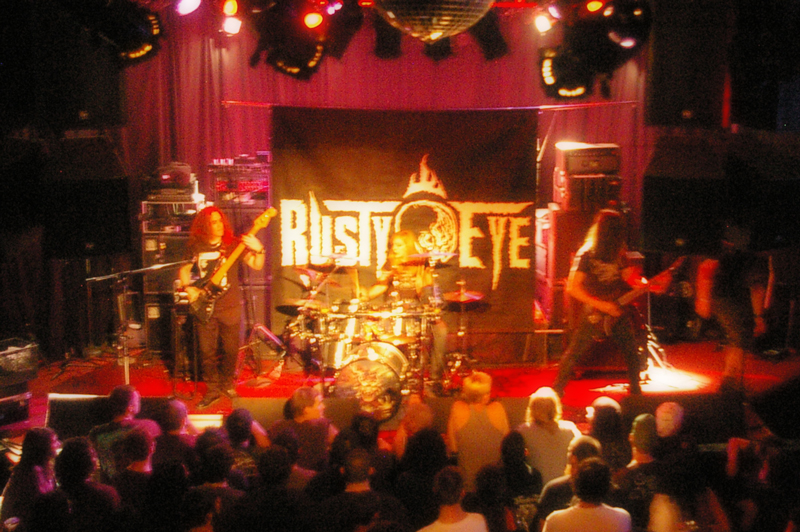
- Rusty Eye performing in 2011

Background information
- Origin: Mexico City, Mexico
- Genres: Heavy metal, progressive metal, punk metal, speed metal, thrash metal, rock en español
- Years active: 1995–present
- Labels: Epoché, Calaca, Blood Blast
- Website: rustyeye.com

Rusty Eye is an American heavy metal trio, originally formed in Mexico City in 1995. In 2004, they relocated to Los Angeles. Rusty Eye has also been the backing band for the rock en español solo musician Sergio Arau since 2015.

== History ==
Rusty Eye was formed in 1995 in Mexico City, Mexico. The band's original lineup consisted of Mr. Rust (born Pablo Armando Salido Casanova) on bass and vocals, 'Dr. Eye' on guitars and vocals, Daniel Acosta on drums, and Ken Harrington on lead vocals. The quartet previously went by the name of 'Scarecrow' in 1993 and 'Poltergeist' in 1994. The name 'Rusty Eye' relates to the "corrosion of perception".

After cutting several independent DIY demos they had previously done, the band recorded their first LP titled Rust N' Roll in 2000. This album was released in Mexico in 2001 and in the United States in 2003, through the band's own indie label, 'Epoche Records'. Miss Randall (born Julieta Randall) joined in 2003, replacing Haze on drums.

The band relocated to Los Angeles in 2004. The band's second production Cryogenic began in 2005 with guitarist Jonny Dee. In 2006, Dee was replaced with the guitarist Baron Murtland. Rusty Eye was awarded the 'Best Metal Single of the Year' award for the single "Mr. Cannibal" by the L.A. Music Awards in 2006 and were listed in the Trade Magazine 'Music Connection' Top 100 Unsigned Artists of 2006.

In December 2006, Murtland took a hiatus from Rusty Eye and was replaced with several live session guitar players, the most notable being Jehu (a.k.a. Jay) from the metalcore band 'Tomorrow Comes Today'. Jehu appeared as the guitarist and played "The Chef" in the "Mr. Cannibal" music video. In September 2008 Murtland returned to Rusty Eye. On June 6, 2009, the band released the Possessor album, which blended different metal styles and sounds, and had a horror film influence.

On December 12, 2010, Rusty Eye celebrated the 15th Anniversary of the band with the release of a live CD titled Live at The Rainbow MMX. The live performance was recorded in April 2010 and Rusty Eye became the first band to record a live album at the Rainbow Bar and Grill in West Hollywood, CA. The album was produced by Miss Randall and was recorded with the band's mobile studio with the help of engineer Yuri Anysonian.

On February 28, 2014, Rusty Eye released Saca el Cobre, an LP in Spanish, for the first time in their career. It included cover songs from Mexican rock en español artists from 1988 to 1992. It also includes two re-recorded versions of Rusty Eye's 'Mr. Cannibal': one an English-language remake, the second a Spanish run-through renamed 'Sr. Canibal'. The announcement of Miss Randall's departure from the band coincided with the release of the album.

On February 10, 2015, Rusty Eye announced a collaboration with solo rock en español artist Sergio Arau, along with the return of Miss Randall. They re-recorded a song from Arau's first solo album named 'No me late la tira (Ni me latirá!)', which was digitally released as a single through Arau's own label 'Calaca'.

== Band members ==
Current members

- Mr. Rust (Paul Casanova a.k.a. Pablo Salido) – bass and Vocals (1995–present)
- Baron Murtland (Tony Murtland) – guitars (2006, 2008–present)
- Miss Randall – drums and vocals (2003–2014, 2015–present)

Former members

- Jehu – guitar [from "Tomorrow Comes Today"] (2007)
- J Dee – guitar (2005)
- Dr. Eye (Rodrigo Xavier Gonzalez) – guitar and vocals (1995–1996, 1999–2003)
- Rodrigo Tarrats – guitar (1997–1998, 2001–2002)
- Sgt. Stoner (Rodrigo Pacheco) – drums (2001–2002)
- Octane Insane (Octavio Buzo) – guitar (2001–2002)
- Leo Haze (Leonardo Jaso) – drums and keyboards (1999–2000)
- Gian Cross (Giancarlo Cruz) – guitar (1999)
- Daniel Acosta – drums (1995–1998)
- El Perro (Vidal Perez) – guitar (1996)
- Kenneth Harrington – vocals (1995–1996)

Timeline

== Discography ==
=== US releases ===
- Dissecting Shadows (2020. Epoché/Blood BLast Distribution)
- Can't wait to go to Hell Single (2020. Epoché/Blood BLast Distribution)
- This is Permanent Single (2020. Epoché/Blood BLast Distribution)
- Rust n' Roll Over Again EP (2019. Epoché)
- "Hey Santa" (Music from the motion picture Slay Belles) Single (2018. Epoché)
- "Mr. Cannibal" (Remake) Single (2014. Epoché)
- Saca el Cobre (2014. Epoché)
- Live at The Rainbow MMX (2010. Epoché)
- Possessor (2009. Epoché)
- Stendhal Syndrome (2007. Epoché)
- Live at The Joint MMVII (2006. Epoché)
- Cryogenic Ep 3" Mini CD (2005. Epoché)
- "Rust n' Roll" (2001. Epoché)

=== As Sergio Arau's band ===
- "¡No Me Late La Tira! Ni Me Latirá!" Single (2015. Calaca)

=== Compilations ===
- Skratch Magazine Vol. 30 (2006) Includes: Cryonic Suspension & Zombie
- Metal Edge Magazine Sampler Dec. 07 (2007) Includes: Mr. Cannibal
- Working for the Machine – A Tribute to Circus of Power (2008) Includes: Mama Tequila
- FTU Compilation Volume 1 "Death Rides A Pale White Dude" (2010) Includes: Wings of a Demon
- Heavy Metal Magazine: Gates, Vol. 1 – Ascension (Webcomic Soundtrack) (2011) Includes: The Entity (Ghostly Lust)
- Acuerdate de... (Acapulco Hurricane Benefit Compilation) (2014) Includes: Sr. Caníbal ("Mr Cannibal" Spanish version)

=== Demo releases ===
- Malpractice (1995. Epoche)
- Self-Determination (1995. Epoche)
- Aphotical Virtues (1996. Epoche)
- !ffOkcuF (1997. Epoche)
- Suffer The Neighbors [live] (1997. Epoche)
- Blasted (1998. Epoche)
- Wasted (1998. Epoche)
- St. Jerome's Acoustic Serenade (1999. Epoche)
- Menage a Trois [live] (1999. Epoche)
- "Speaks of The Devil" (2001. Epoche) re-released as "Rust n' Roll"
- "Luvsong" [Single] (2001. Epoche)
- Live at Rockotitlan [live](2003. Epoche)

=== Music videos ===
- Mr. Cannibal (2007)
