= Berlin Without Jews =

Dystopian novel by Arthur Landsberger

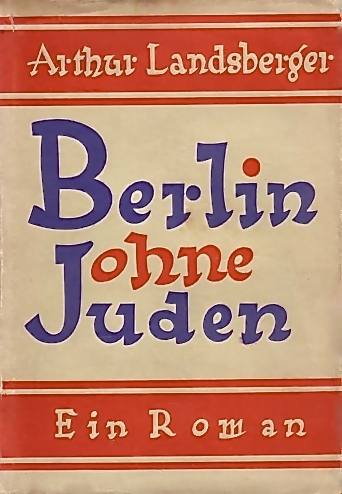
The cover of Berlin Without Jews

Berlin Without Jews (German: Berlin ohne Juden) is a 1925 dystopian novel by Arthur Landsberger. It is written from the point-of-view of two German families friendly to each other; the Oppenheims are Jewish, and the Rudenbergs are Lutherans. In the events of the book, a right-wing nationalist political party takes power and expels German Jews. The other factions of German politics and society stand by, doing nothing, thinking the Jews matter little. The expulsion has unfortunate consequences for Germany. German life is poorer both culturally and economically without the Jews, and the novel ends with the government sheepishly inviting the German Jews back and welcoming them as valued members of society.

The novel was described as a "tragi-satire" by its author. It includes satirical jabs at the rhetoric and ideologies of the Weimar Republic.

== Background ==
Austrian author Hugo Bettauer wrote The City Without Jews in 1922, which was made into a film in 1924. It was quite similar to Landsberger's work and likely an inspiration; in Bettauer's book, it is Vienna which exiles its Jews, and similar to Landsberger, the work focuses not on the suffering of the exiled Jews, but rather the effects on Austrian Christians. Also similar is its somewhat comical bent to the consequences, such as the inability to find good coffee shops or cafes. Both novels ended with the Jews being asked to return. Bettauer was shot on March 10, 1925, by a Nazi Party member, and died shortly afterward.

== Plot and characters ==
- Boris Pinski is a Russian Bolshevik sent from Moscow to Germany to prepare for the revolution.
- Benno Oppenheim, a Commerce Minister in the Reichstag, is an assimilated Jew and successful businessman. He organizes the mass emigration.
- Hans Oppenheim, Benno's son and a member of the Foreign Office, is married to Elisabeth Rudenberg.
- Robert Rudenberg, a professor of economics, is married to Hans Oppenheim's sister Erna.
- Eduard Rudenberg, Robert's brother, sees politics as a game, and sees his chance in the nationalist movement. He works at the newspaper B.Z. where he both learns and spreads tabloid gossip. After seeing the consequences of the expulsion of the Jews, he eventually changes his mind and works on their recall.

The novel opens with the intrigues of Boris Pinski. Despite being a Bolshevik, he joins with and advises the nationalist parties, feeling that their victory would hasten a German communist revolution. He believes that taking an anti-Jewish tack would help them win the next elections. Pinski writes a publication which calls for the German Jews to demonstrate their patriotism and loyalty to Germany by pooling their fortunes together to pay the Treaty of Versailles reparations owed by Germany.

Unsurprisingly, the Jewish leadership rejects such a proposal; this confirms pre-existing prejudices of the German Jews as somehow not loyal to their country. Backed by this, the nationalists win the election while riots occur throughout the country, with 200 homes looted and 160 Jews killed. The new Reichstag approves the exile of all Jews. Half-Jew/half-Germans are allowed to remain, but lose their right to vote and hold public offices. Benno Oppenheim gives a speech on behalf of the opposition "in the spirit of the Sermon on the Mount" decrying the new policy. Some 97 prominent Jews older than 65 years - including Benno Oppenheim - refuse in a letter of protest to leave the country, and commit suicide, instead.

The propaganda department attempts to make the expulsion of the Jews tolerable and uses music, parades, colorful uniforms, movies, and revues as a distraction. Soon afterward, the nationalists begin to target the centrists as their next scapegoat.

After some hesitation, a trade boycott is imposed against Germany, causing a shortage of raw materials. Strikes break out. Food is rationed. Tourism collapses. As Pinski had hoped, the Bolsheviks are strengthened and engage in street battles with supporters of the nationalists. The (unnamed) chancellor is forced to admit the disastrous economic situation before the Reichstag; the opposition calls for a reversal of the policy. The nationalist parties break apart, the government loses the confidence vote, and a new emergency government of centrists is created. The expulsion is reversed and the Oppenheims return home to the celebration of the residents of Berlin.

== Legacy ==
Landsberger's novels were reasonably successful in the 1920s, but faded from public view in the 1930s and 1940s as Berlin Without Jews had proven uncomfortably accurate - except that reality did not provide a happy ending in which the exiled German Jews returned.

Landsberger himself committed suicide in 1933, six months after Adolf Hitler became Chancellor following the 1933 elections, and the novel was largely forgotten until a new printing was made in 1998.

== See also ==
- German federal election, December 1924 – both the Nazis and the Communists suffered severe setbacks in this election, something that Landsberger did not know as he was writing the novel.
