= Hans Effenberger =

Austrian actor

- Born: 20 May 1902; Vienna, Austro-Hungarian Empire
- Died: 8 September 1955 (aged 53); Vienna, Austria
- Occupations: Actor, director
- Years active: 1922-1949 (film)

Hans Effenberger (1902–1955) was an Austrian actor. Primarily a stage performer, he also appeared in several silent films. Later in his career he briefly worked as a screenwriter, and co-directed the 1949 film We've Just Got Married.

== Selected filmography ==
- Oh, Dear Augustine (1922)
- The House of Molitor (1922)
- The City Without Jews (1924)
- The Monte Cristo of Prague (1929)
- We Make Music (1942, writer)
- We've Just Got Married (1949, director)

== Bibliography ==
- Fritsche, Maria. Homemade Men in Postwar Austrian Cinema: Nationhood, Genre and Masculinity. Berghahn Books, 2013.
