= Döbling Synagogue =

Former synagogue in Vienna, Austria

- German: Synagoge Döbling
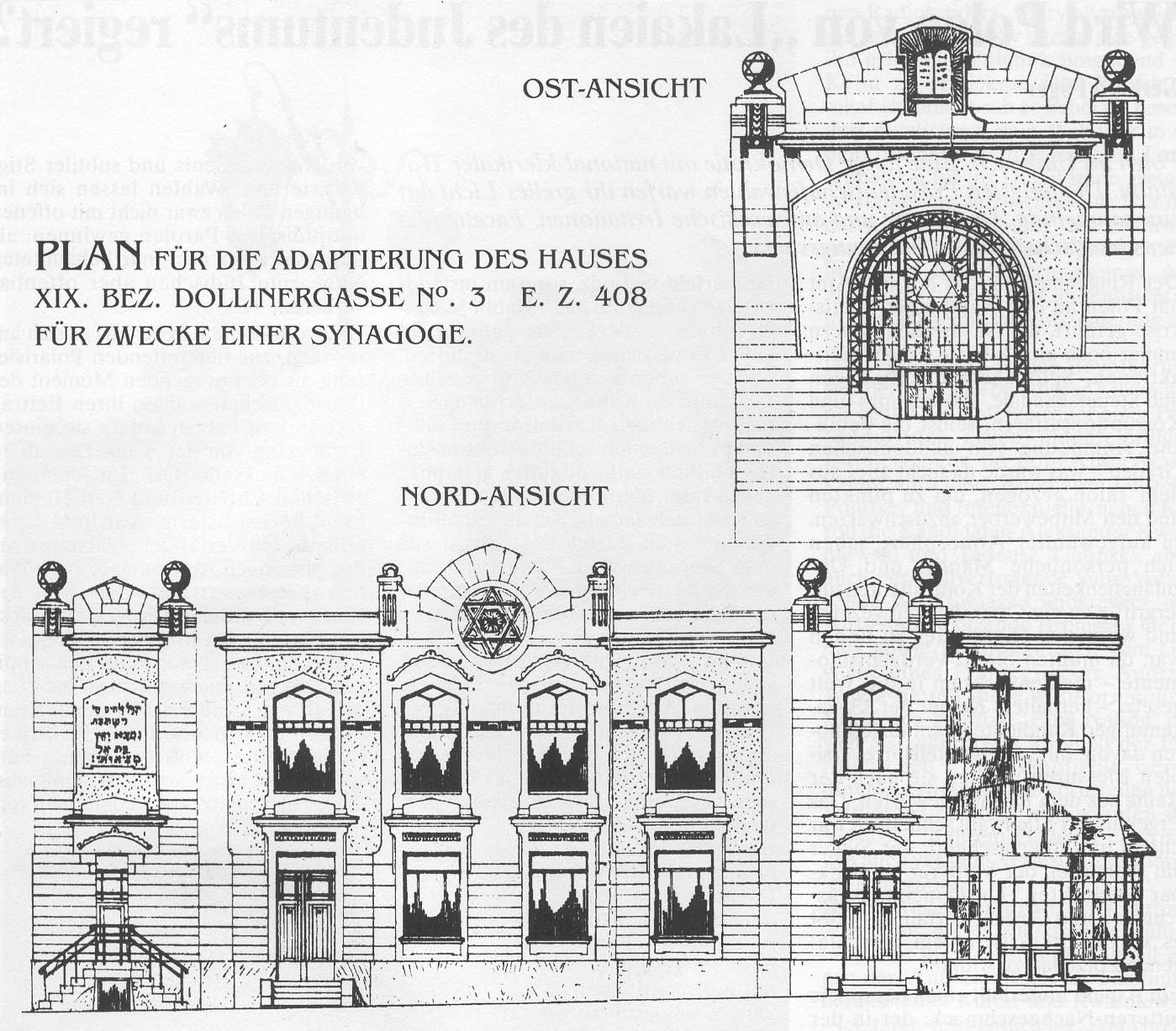
- Julius Wohlmuth's plans to transform Dollinergasse number 3 into a synagogue

- Location of the former synagogue in Austria

Religion
- Affiliation: Judaism (former)
- Ecclesiastical or organisational status: Synagogue (1907–1938)
- Status: Destroyed / Demolished

Location
- Location: Oberdöbling, Döbling, Vienna
- Country: Austria
- Coordinates: 48°14′22″N 16°21′12″E

Architecture
- Architect: Julius Wohlmuth
- Type: Synagogue architecture
- Style: Art Nouveau
- Established: c. 1890s (as a congregation)
- Completed: 1907
- Demolished: 1938 (partially destroyed in Kristallnacht); 1995 (deconsecrated and demolished)
- Capacity: 460

The Döbling Synagogue (German: Synagoge Döbling) was a former Jewish synagogue that was located in the Dollinergasse in the suburb of Oberdöbling, in Döbling, in the 19th district of Vienna, Austria. Completed in 1907, the building was ruined and partially destroyed in the Kristallnacht pogrom of November 1938. Later, the synagogue was deconsecrated and in 1995, it was replaced with a modern apartment tower.

== History ==
The erection of the Döbling Synagogue was preceded by the founding of the Temple Association “Döbling” at the end of the 19th century. It is not known exactly when the association was founded, but it was being supported by the Israelitische Kultusgemeinde Wien in the 1890s. The association was based in the Vormosergasse; in 1904, it relocated to the Gatterburggasse.

The association's plans for the construction of an expensive temple, probably in the Gatterburggasse, could not be realised by the association's leadership, and it seemed likely that the association would be disbanded in 1904. Although the majority of the association's members were at first in favour of disbanding it, a group formed around Julius Lederer with the goal of constructing at least a modest prayer room. Lederer brought together a new leadership committee which decided to purchase a building in the Dollinergasse (number 3). With the support of the Israelitische Kultusgemeinde, which subsidised the project with 40,000 Kronen, the building was transformed into a synagogue, designed by Julius Wohlmuth in the Art Nouveau style. The synagogue was sanctified on 5 September 1907.

The synagogue featured a prayer room with galleries for women and a total capacity of 460 seats, a language and religious school, as well as rooms for the Frauenwohltätigkeitsverein f. d. XIX Bezirk (Ladies’ Charity Organisation for the 19th District) and the Bund jüdischer Eltern, Wien XIX (League of Jewish Parents, Vienna 19th District). The building was ruined and heavily damaged in the Kristallnacht pogrom in 1938. Later, it was deconsecrated and robbed of its decorative façade. The building was finally torn down in 1995 and an apartment tower was erected on the site. A small plaque in front of the tower recalls the former existence of the synagogue.

“Hier befand sich eine 1907 nach Plänen von Architekt Julius Wohlmuth eingerichtete Synagoge. Sie wurde in der “Reichskristallnacht” am 10.11.1938 verwüstet und schwer beschädigt.”/“There was a synagogue here, built in 1907 according to plans by architect Julius Wohlmuth. It was devastated and badly damaged during Kristallnacht on November 10, 1938.”

== The building ==
The Döbling Synagogue was a relatively small, two-storey building, with a narrow front in the Dollinergasse. The building was turned into an Art Nouveau synagogue designed by architect Julius Wohlmut. The synagogue's secessionist façade was noteworthy. It had risalits with narrow gables, each of which was flanked by a pair of Stars of David. The middle gable was decorated with a large Star of David and stylised rays of sunlight. A large round arched window ornamented the building's front in the Dollinergasse. Two marble tablets were placed in the entrance hall of the synagogue. One honoured Lederer's work; the other bore a quote from the Hebrew Bible “My house shall be called a house of prayer for all peoples” (Isaiah 56:7). A memorial tablet for the victims of World War I was added in 1919.

== See also ==
- History of the Jews in Vienna
