= Sergio Arau =

Mexican singer, film director

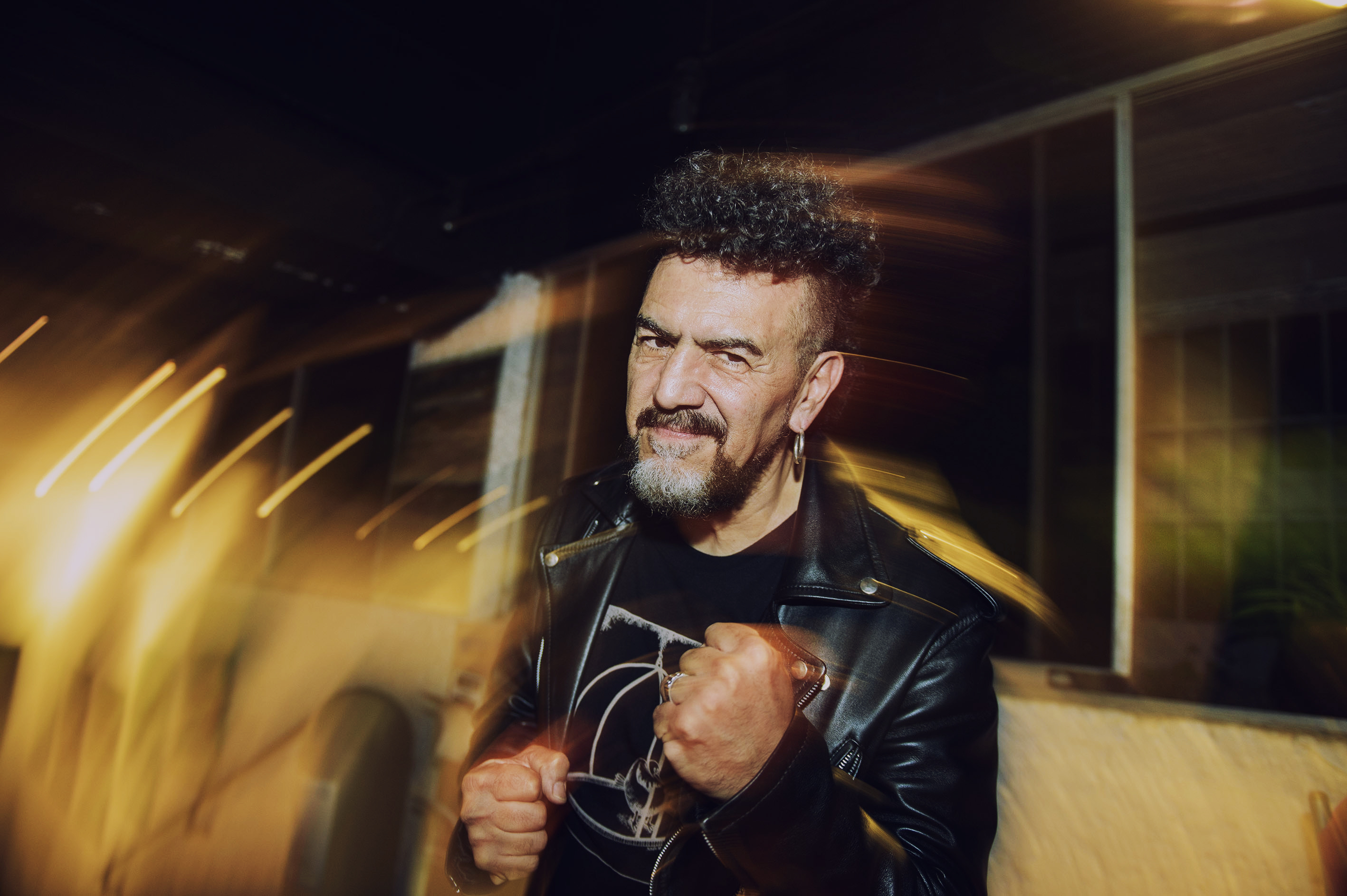

Background information
- Also known as: El Uyuyuy
- Born: Alfonso Sergio Arau Corona; November 14, 1951 (age 74); Mexico City, Mexico
- Genres: Rock, Rock en Español, Guacarrock, alternative rock
- Occupations: Musician, singer-songwriter, screenwriter, film director, film producer, music producer
- Instruments: Vocals, guitar
- Years active: 1971 - present
- Labels: PolyGram, Sony Music, Discos Rockotitlán, Cielito Eléctrico, Caset
- Member of: Rusty Eye
- Formerly of: La Ley de Herodes
- Website: www.sergioarau.com

Sergio Arau (born Alfonso Sergio Arau Corona; November 14, 1951), also known as "El Uyuyuy", is a Mexican musician, singer-songwriter, screenwriter, film director, film producer, and music producer.

== Life ==
He is the son of film director Alfonso Arau.

Arau was a founding member of the band Botellita de Jerez which was formed in 1983 and created the style Guacarrock. He got his start in Music at the Avandaro Festival in 1971 with his family band "La Ley de Herodes". As a solo artist, he has released three studio albums. Arau has directed music videos, animations, and film.

He is best known as a film director for the films A Day Without a Mexican and Naco es Chido.

In 1993, he debuted with his four-piece band La Venganza de Moctezuma in Los Angeles. In 2015 he founded the band Los Heavy Mex with members from the Mexican/American band Rusty Eye.
