= The City Without Jews (novel) =

1922 novel by Hugo Bettauer

- Author: Hugo Bettauer
- Original title: Die Stadt ohne Juden
- Language: German
- Genre: Satire, dystopian fiction, political fiction
- Publication date: 1922
- Text: The City Without Jews at Project Gutenberg

The City Without Jews (German: Die Stadt ohne Juden) is a 1922 satirical dystopian novel on antisemitism in Austria by Hugo Bettauer. Bettauer's best-known work, it depicts the hypothetical expulsion of all Jewish residents from Vienna and its catastrophic aftermath.

== Plot summary ==
A fictional politician orders the expulsion of all Jews from Vienna. Alexander Moulton observes "in scenes that are frighteningly prophetic, Austria borrows thirty stock car trains from neighboring countries to help in the expulsion (to the east) of the Jews and their belongings." The citizens of Vienna initially celebrate the expulsion, but public sentiment shifts as theaters go bankrupt and department stores, hotels and resorts suffer. The economy declines to such an extent that a popular movement arises demanding the return of the Jews. Without the Jews to blame, the ruling party collapses; the expulsion law is repealed, and the Jews are welcomed back to Vienna.

== Themes and commentary ==
Hugo Bettauer succeeded in creating a relatively accurate allegorical vision of the near future, although the book was intended as entertainment and as a satirical response to the primitive antisemitism of the 1920s.

Cultural historian Lisa Silverman notes that the novel excludes Jewish women from its treatment, which mirrored their marginalization in real life.

== Reception and aftermath ==
The novel was Bettauer's most commercially successful work: it was translated into several languages, and sold 250,000 copies in its first year. It became one of Bettauer's most controversial works, gaining him both great admirers and bitter enemies. Nazi sympathizers attacked Bettauer and his work, denouncing him as the "Red poet" and a "corruptor of youth". The novel was made into the 1924 feature film The City Without Jews, directed by Hans Karl Breslauer; shortly after the premiere of the film Hugo Bettauer was murdered by Otto Rothstock, a former member of the Nazi Party, who was lionized by the antisemitic Austrian masses and was released less than two years after having been committed to a psychiatric institution.

== Adaptations and related works ==
- The City Without Jews, a 1924 film based on the novel
- Berlin Without Jews, a 1925 dystopian novel likely inspired by The City Without Jews

== See also ==
- A Modern Exodus, a 1904 novel about Jews being expelled from the United Kingdom
