= Hans Karl Breslauer =

Austrian film director

- Born: Johann Karl Breslauer; 2 June 1888; Vienna, Austria
- Died: 15 April 1965 (aged 76); Salzburg
- Spouse: Anny Miletty (m. 1925; died 1948)

Hans Karl Breslauer, born Johann Karl Breslauer, later often known as H. K. Breslauer (2 June 1888 – 15 April 1965), was an early Austrian film director, also an actor, screenwriter and author.

== Life ==
=== Career as actor and screenwriter ===
Hans Karl Breslauer was born in Vienna, the son of the proprietor of a coffee-house, which it was intended he should take over. Instead he became an actor. His first engagements were in Cologne, Wiesbaden and Vienna.

From 1910 Breslauer was active in Berlin as a screenwriter. He produced about 40 filmscripts for the film companies Duskes, Messter, Vitascope, Mutoscope and Biograph.

From 1914 he is supposed to have had his first directing job with Sascha-Film in Vienna, but this has been called into question because of the lack of evidence about directing in these years. He can be shown however to have had an acting role in the Viennese Regent-Film production Zu spät gesühnt (1916).

=== Career as film director ===
Breslauer's first demonstrable directorial involvement was in 1918 in the Sascha-Film production Ihre beste Rolle.

After World War I he worked as a director for Leyka-Film and Biehl-Film. In 1919/1920 he was vicepresident of the Film Directors' Club of Austria. From 1921 Breslauer regularly directed for Mondial-Film, under whose roof he set up his own production company, H.K.B.-Film. Its first films were Lieb' mich, und die Welt ist mein (1924) and Strandgut (also 1924), which he shot in 1923 on Corsica and the French Riviera. On some productions, for example Oh, du lieber Augustin (1922), he also claimed responsibility for the screenplay.

At the end of 1923 Breslauer began filming Hugo Bettauer's successful novel, Die Stadt ohne Juden ("City Without Jews"). Today both the book and the film seem like a premonition of what was to happen in Europe from 1933, but at the time were intended as comedy and designed to have a wide popular appeal. Breslauer therefore changed a number of details during filming, as a result of which various allusions to the real world deliberately intended by Bettauer, were lost. A clearly noticeable example of this is the change in the name of the city from Vienna, as it was in the book, to Utopia in the film. The reason for most of the deviations from the original was to reduce the political controversy of the film in order to avoid problems with censorship and alienating public opinion. Nevertheless, in many showings of the film, which was not as successful as the book had been, there were disturbances from Nazis. The film, which was until 2015 thought lost, or partially lost, has now been restored. It provides insight into the "normality" of anti-Semitism in the 1920s.

After Die Stadt ohne Juden no further film work by Breslauer is known. The film newspaper Mein Film reports of his directing on a Sascha-Film production Der fliegende Haupttreffer, but this apparently never came to anything. His departure from the film world may well be explained by the crisis caused across the entire European film industry by the massive expansion of the cheap American film market from Hollywood, which put most European film producers under enormous pressure, including those in Austria, where most film production companies went out of business.

In October 1925 Breslauer married the actress Anna (or Anny) Milety, who had taken the female lead in many of his films.

=== Career as journalist and author ===
From the 1930s Breslauer was very active as a writer. He was a member of the Reich Chamber of Literature and published under the pseudonym "Bastian Schneider". Between 1934 and 1939 he regularly wrote amusing contributions for the Grenzboten in Bratislava (then Pressburg), from 1936 to 1942 for Das kleine Blatt in Vienna and additionally from 1938 to 1944 for the Kleine Volks-Zeitung, also in Vienna. From 1940, the same year in which he joined the Nazi Party, he contributed light pieces to newspapers across the entire Third Reich, for example the Breslauer Neueste Nachrichten, the Essener Allgemeine Zeitung and the Leipziger Tageszeitung.

After the end of World War II Breslauer and his wife moved to Loibichl near Mondsee in Upper Austria, where they rented rooms in a guesthouse. He continued to publish, now writing mostly short fiction under his own name and the pseudonyms "Jenny Romberg" and "James O'Cleaner". Success eluded him from now on, and he died impoverished in Salzburg Hospital on 15 April 1965.

== Works ==
=== Films ===
Breslauer was involved in the direction of these films unless otherwise indicated:

- 1916: Zu spät gesühnt (actor; directed by Franz Ferdinand Bertram)
- 1918: Ihre beste Rolle
- 1918: Das Baby
- 1919: Little Pitsch als Meisterdetektiv
- 1919: Am See der Erlösung
- 1919: Onkel Tonis Brautfahrt
- 1920: Jou Jou
- 1920: Miss Cowboy
- 1921: Der Findling des Glücks (also screenplay)
- 1921: Das Geheimnis der Nacht
- 1921: Tragödie eines Häßlichen
- 1922: Am Rande des Abgrundes
- 1922: The House of Molitor (also screenplay)
- 1922: Oh, Dear Augustine (also screenplay)
- 1922: Verklungene Zeiten
- 1924: Lieb' mich, und die Welt ist mein (also screenplay)
- 1924: Strandgut (also screenplay)
- 1924: Die Stadt ohne Juden (also screenplay)

=== Books ===
- 1941: Der Dreißig-Pfennig-Roman: Das Ei des Kolumbus (crime novel)
- 1943: Liebe, Diebe (short stories)
- 1951: Erdball-Romane Band 77: Eine kleine Taubenfeder (short novel)
- 1952: Heute wird gefilmt in Bellevue
- 1952: Kelter Romane Band 132: Dr. Scarrons dunkler Punkt (short novel)
- 1952: Der Dohlengraf (as Jenny Romberg)
- 1953: Die erdolchte Mumie
- 1953: Heiraten und nicht verzweifeln
- 1953: Im Wirbel des Schicksals (as Jenny Romberg)
- 1954: Die schönste von allen (romantic novel)
- 1954: Der Sprung ins Ungewisse (crime novel)
- 1955: Ich kann dich nicht vergessen (short novel)
- 1955: Sehnsucht nach der Heimat (short novel)
- 1956: Das Herz kann irren (short novel, as Jenny Romberg)
- 1957: Güldensee-Romane Band 123: Das Mädchen vom Rütihof (short novel)
- 1957: Wolfgang Marken's Roman-Freund Band 134: Das Opfer der Aglaja (short novel)
- 1957: Wolfgang Marken's Roman-Freund Band 141: Das Spiel mit der Liebe (short novel)
- 1957: Wolfgang Marken's Roman-Freund Band 144: Der Diener seiner Exzellenz (short novel)
- 1960: Der Fluch der Sürch-Alp (short novel, as Jenny Romberg)
- 1961: Familienfreund-Roman-Blätter Nr. 17: Das letzte Konzert (short novel)
- 1961: Lorelei-Liebesromane: Wo wohnt das Glück (short novel)
- 1963: Linden-Roman Nr. 165: Liebesfrühling im Achental (short novel)
- 1964: Ursel und der Hochstapler (short novel)

== Sources ==
- Armin Loacker: Johann Karl Breslauer. In: Guntram Geser (ed.), Armin Loacker (ed.): Die Stadt ohne Juden. Verlag Filmarchiv Austria, Vienna 2000, pp. 169–171
