= Melinda S. Allen =

American–New Zealand archaeologist

- Education: University of Arizona (BA) University of Hawaii at Manoa (MA) University of Washington (PhD)
- Scientific career
- Fields: Pacific archaeology
- Workplaces: Bernice Pauahi Bishop Museum, University of Auckland
- Thesis: Dynamic landscapes and human subsistence: Archaeological investigations on Aitutaki Island, southern Cook Islands (1992)
- Website: https://www.arts.auckland.ac.nz/people/mall054

Melinda S. Allen is an American–New Zealand archaeologist. She is currently a full professor at the University of Auckland.

== Academic career ==
Melinda gained her BA in anthropology and biology from the University of Arizona, followed by her Master of Arts in anthropology (archaeology) from the University of Hawaiʻi at Mānoa. After a PhD titled 'Dynamic landscapes and human subsistence: Archaeological investigations on Aitutaki Island, southern Cook Islands' at the University of Washington (Seattle), Allen moved to the Bernice Pauahi Bishop Museum. In 1996 she took up a position as lecturer at the University of Auckland, rising to full professor where she specializes in Bioarchaeology and Paleoecology, and curates the university's Anthropology Zooarchaeological Reference Collection.

== Selected works ==
- Allen, Melinda S. "New ideas about late Holocene climate variability in the central Pacific." Current Anthropology 47, no. 3 (2006): 521–535.
- Allen, Melinda S. "Style and function in East Polynesian fishhooks." Antiquity 70, no. 267 (1996): 97–116.
- Allen, Melinda S., and Rod Wallace. "New evidence from the East Polynesian gateway: Substantive and methodological results from Aitutaki, southern Cook Islands." Radiocarbon 49, no. 3 (2007): 1163–1179.
- Allen, Melinda S. "Bet-hedging strategies, agricultural change, and unpredictable environments: historical development of dryland agriculture in Kona, Hawaii." Journal of Anthropological Archaeology 23, no. 2 (2004): 196–224.
- Allen, Melinda S. "Resolving long-term change in Polynesian marine fisheries." Asian Perspectives (2002): 195–212.
