= Otto Rothstock =

Austrian assassin (1904–1990)

Otto Rothstock (10 April 1904 – 26 May 1990 in Hannover) was an Austrian Nazi living in Germany, who assassinated Austrian Jewish writer Hugo Bettauer.

As a young member of the Austrian National Socialist Party during the 1920s, Rothstock was enraged by Bettauer's satire of Nazi anti-semitism in his popular work, The City Without Jews. On March 10, 1925, Rothstock entered Bettauer's office in Vienna and shot him five times at point-blank range. Hugo Bettauer died on March 26, 1925, from his wounds. At his trial, Rothstock claimed that his actions were necessary to save German culture from the menace of Jewish degeneration. His lawyer, Walter Riehl, (himself a Nazi functionary) argued that his client was guilty but insane, with which the jury agreed. However, within twenty months Rothstock was released as “cured” from a mental hospital. A fair amount of money was collected from the general public for him.

Rothstock was an unrepentant Nazi. In a 1977 interview on the Austrian Broadcasting Corporation, Rothstock reportedly boasted of Bettauer's "extinction".
