= Hugo Bettauer =

Austrian writer and satirist (1872–1925)

Maximilian Hugo Bettauer
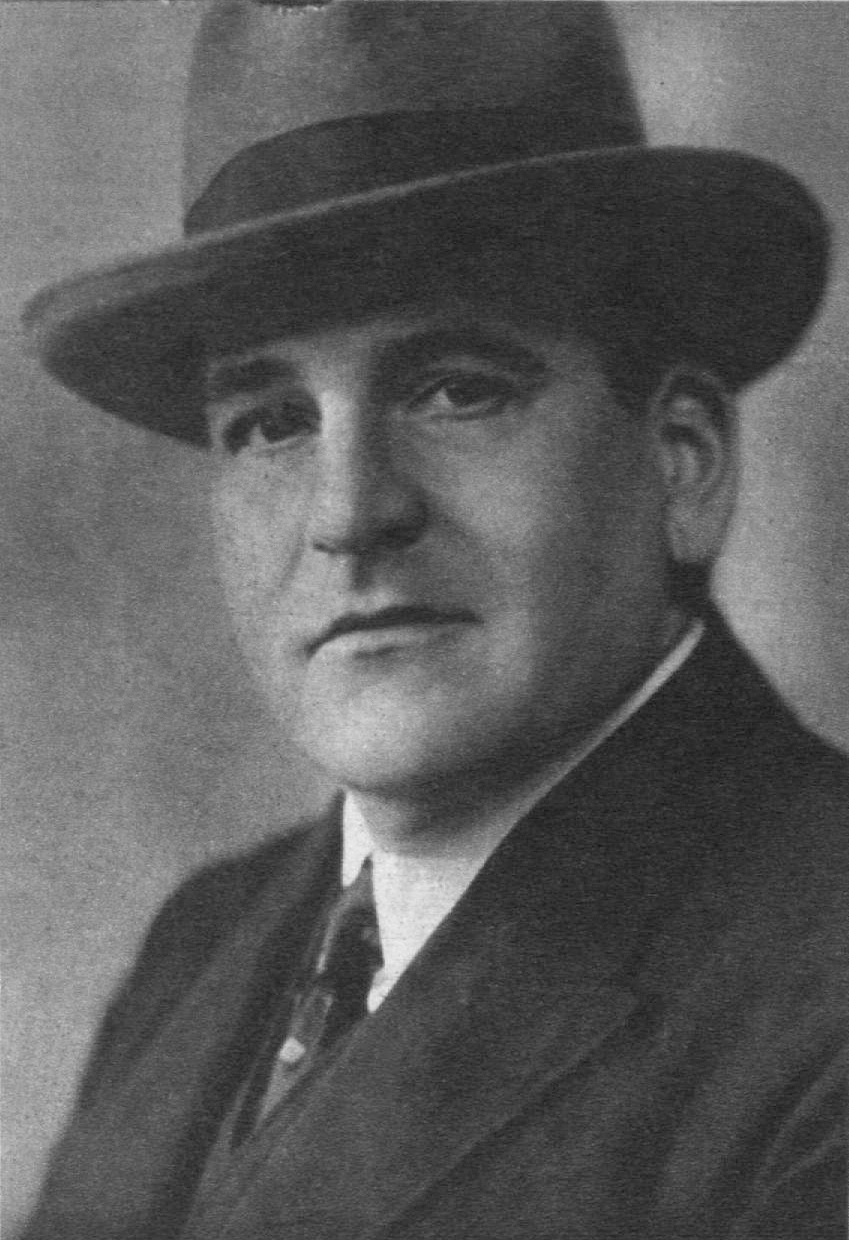
- Hugo Bettauer sometime between 1910 and 1920
- Born: 18 August 1872; Baden bei Wien, Baden, Austria-Hungary
- Died: 26 March 1925 (aged 52); Vienna, Austria
- Resting place: Feuerhalle Simmering, Vienna, Austria
- Citizenship: Austrian, American
- Education: Franz-Joseph-Gymnasium in the Stubenbastei, Vienna
- Occupations: Journalist, Novelist, Playwright, Newspaper Owner
- Spouse(s): Olga Steiner; Helene Müller
- Children: Heinrich Gustav Hellmuth Bettauer; Reginald Parker Bettauer
- Relatives: Hermine (Michi) Bettauer; Mathilde Bettauer (Sisters)
- Writing career
- Language: German
- Years active: 1900–1925
- Notable work: Die Stadt ohne Juden (The City Without Jews)

Maximilian Hugo Bettauer (18 August 1872 – 26 March 1925) was a prolific Austrian writer and journalist, who was murdered by a Nazi Party follower on account of his opposition to antisemitism. He was well known in his lifetime; many of his books were bestsellers and in the 1920s a number were made into films, most notably Die freudlose Gasse (The Joyless Street, directed by Georg Wilhelm Pabst, 1925), which dealt with prostitution, and Die Stadt ohne Juden (The City Without Jews, directed by Hans Karl Breslauer, 1924), a satire against antisemitism.

== Life ==
Maximilian Hugo Bettauer, later known as Hugo Bettauer, was born in Baden bei Wien on 18 August 1872, the son of the stockbroker Arnold (Samuel Aron) Bettauer from Lemberg (Lviv) and his wife Anna (née Wecker). He had two older sisters, Hermine (Michi) and Mathilde. In 1887–88, together with Karl Kraus, he attended the fourth form of the Franz-Joseph-Gymnasium in the Stubenbastei, Vienna. Kraus was to be his fiercest critic for the whole of his life.

At the age of 16 Bettauer ran away from home and travelled to Alexandria, from where the Austrian Consul sent him straight back again.

In 1890 Bettauer converted from the Jewish faith to the Evangelical (Lutheran) church. In the same year he joined the Kaiserjäger (Imperial mountain infantry) as a one-year volunteer. The change of religion was presumably connected with the fact that Jewish soldiers who lacked noble status found it virtually impossible to make any kind of career in the military, and for conversion purposes the Evangelical Church was preferable to the Roman Catholic Church.

=== Marriage and emigration ===
After five months in Tyrol, he left the army due to difficulties with his superiors. Together with his mother he moved to Zürich and in 1896, aged 24, gained possession of his substantial inheritance from his father.

In Zürich he married the love of his youth, Olga Steiner, with whom, after the death of his mother, he emigrated to the United States. During the crossing, in a disastrous speculation Bettauer lost his entire fortune. He and Olga remained until 1899 in New York City, where she appeared as an actress. Although Bettauer acquired American citizenship, he was unable to find work, so they travelled to Berlin, where their son Heinrich Gustav Hellmuth Bettauer was born. (Their son went by the name Helmut and was transported to Auschwitz in 1942, where he presumably died.)

In Berlin Bettauer worked as a journalist and made a name for himself in connection with the exposure of a number of scandals. Among other things he wrote in the aftermath of one such scandal the book Bobbie, which appeared in 1921, in which he described a rich and powerful child abductor.

In 1901 after the suicide of the director of the Berliner Hoftheater, whom he had accused of corruption, Bettauer was expelled from the Kingdom of Prussia. He then moved to Munich, where he worked in the cabaret Die Elf Scharfrichter ("The eleven executioners") and in the autumn of 1901 went to Hamburg to become director of the specialist publication, Küche und Keller ("Kitchen and Cellar").

=== Second marriage ===
After his first marriage had ended in divorce, Bettauer became acquainted in Hamburg with his future second wife, Helene Müller, who at the time was aged 16. In 1904 they eloped to America. They married during the crossing, and in the same year their son Reginald Parker Bettauer was born. In New York Bettauer worked as a newspaper journalist, and also began to write serial novels for newspaper publication.

In 1910 he returned to Vienna and took a job with the Neue Freie Presse. When at the beginning of World War I he wanted to join the army he was turned down, on the grounds of his American citizenship.

In 1918, after an altercation caused by a defective typewriter, he was fired from the Neue Freie Presse.

=== After the war ===
Immediately after the war Bettauer worked as a correspondent for various New York papers, and started an aid programme in New York for the people of Vienna. From 1920 he produced novels in great quantity, publishing four or five every year. He specialised in crime stories with a social message, which were extremely popular. Another reason for the popularity of his novels was that they were not only set in Vienna but also in Berlin and New York.

=== The City Without Jews ===
His best-known novel was Die Stadt ohne Juden ("The City Without Jews") from 1922, a satire on the acutely topical subject of antisemitism. In the book, a fictional politician orders the expulsion of all Jews from Vienna. One writer noted that "in scenes that are frighteningly prophetic, Austria borrows thirty stock car trains from neighboring countries to help in the expulsion (to the east) of the Jews and their belongings." In the book, the citizens of Vienna initially celebrated the expulsion, but sentiment changed as theaters went bankrupt and department stores, hotels and resorts suffered. The economy declined to such an extent that a popular movement arose demanding the return of the Jews. Without the Jews to blame, the ruling party collapsed; the expulsion law was repealed, and the Jews were welcomed back to Vienna.

The City Without Jews sold 250,000 copies in its first year, and became one of Bettauer's most controversial works, gaining him both great admirers and bitter enemies. Nazi sympathizers attacked Bettauer and his work, denouncing him as the "Red poet" and a "corruptor of youth".

=== Investigative journalism and other work ===
Besides all this, Bettauer set up Bettauers Wochenschrift, a weekly paper that regularly caused controversy with its progressive, not to say provocative, contents. As in the United States, he exploited the concept of the serial novel.

A much shorter-lived venture was another weekly paper, Er und Sie. Wochenschrift für Lebenskultur und Erotik ("He and She. Weekly Paper for Lifestyle and Eroticism"), which Bettauer launched in 1924 together with Rudolf Olden; it was closed down after five numbers.

In the course of time Bettauer's works brought him substantial returns in terms of stage and film rights, as their racy and often controversial contents made them popular for adaptation.

He was thus not only one of the most controversial, but also one of the most successful writers of his time. In the film version of Die freudlose Gasse (G. W. Pabst, 1925), Greta Garbo made her international screen debut, and in Stadt ohne Juden, which was filmed in 1924 under the director Hans Karl Breslauer, both Hans Moser and Ferdinand Maierhofer made theirs.

Because of his "investigative journalism" and his stance in favour of sexual openness and liberation, Bettauer was repeatedly the object of public debate. His opponents sought to discredit him as an "asphalt litterateur" (Asphaltliterat) - a term used by traditionalists and Nazis to criticise writers and writing for departing from German homeland. Over time the conflict escalated: Bettauer was publicly vilified, his newspaper was confiscated, and eventually a legal action was brought against him; a side-effect of which was an outbreak of public threats and calls for his murder. Surprisingly, Bettauer was acquitted; the subsequent edition of his newspaper reached a circulation of 60,000, the highest ever among weeklies of the period; in March 1925 its expansion was being seriously considered.

=== Assassination ===
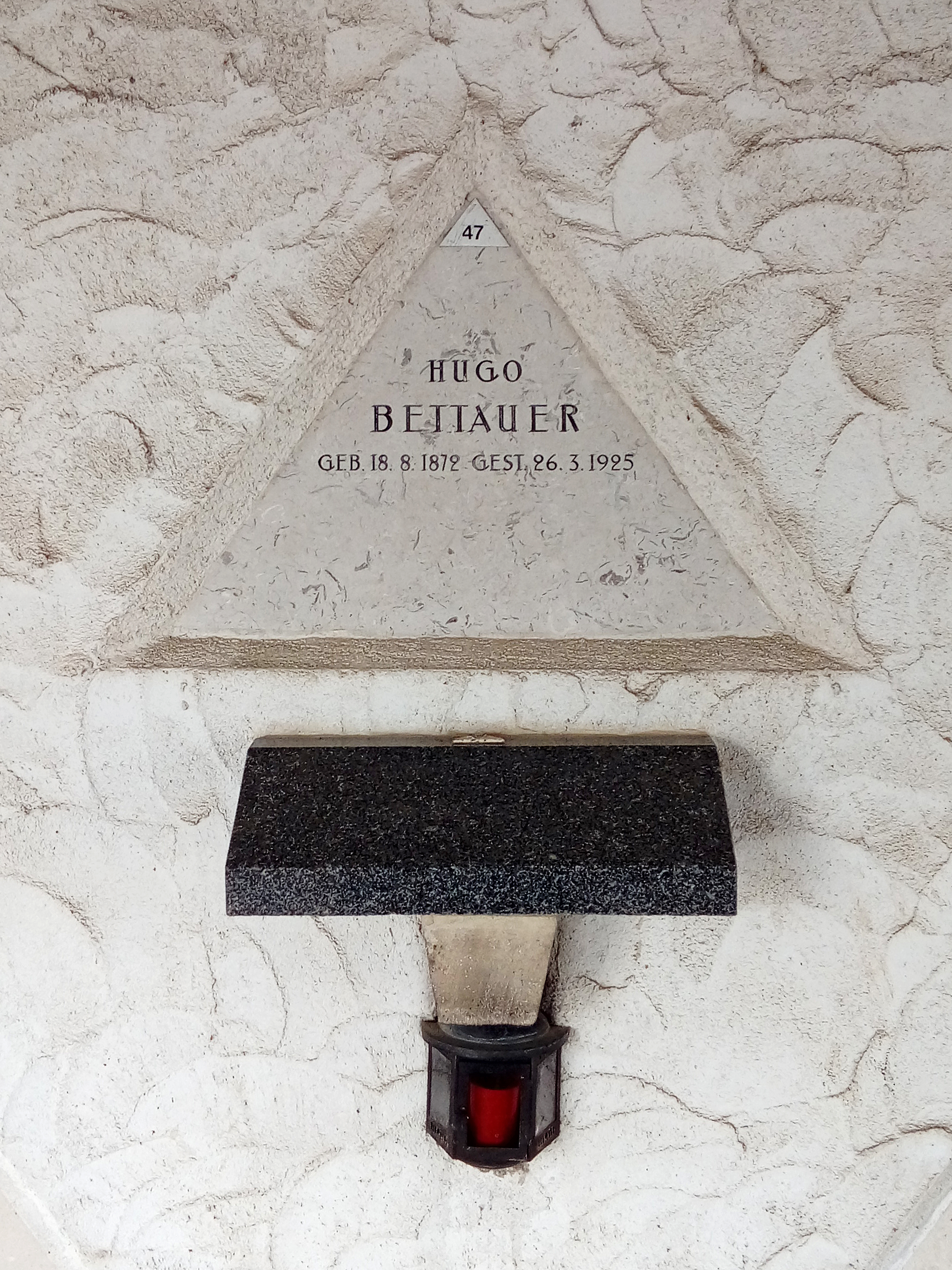
Feuerhalle Simmering, grave of Hugo Bettauer

The Nazis branded Bettauer a "Red poet" and "corruptor of youth", and an Austrian party member published a series of articles calling for "radical self help" and "lynch justice against all polluters of our people". On 10 March 1925, a dental technician named Otto Rothstock shot Bettauer several times. He was taken to hospital in Vienna with serious injuries and died on 26 March 1925. He was cremated at Feuerhalle Simmering, where also his ashes are buried.

Even before his death there were heated arguments, to the point of physical violence, in the Wiener Gemeinderat (Vienna City Council) over the motives of the attacker. Rothstock maintained that he wanted to take a stand against the alleged immorality of an author who had become famous for his sexually explicit and liberal writings. However, it was established that before the attack Rothstock had been a member of the National Socialist party, and although by March 1925 he had left it again, he was nevertheless supported after Bettauer's death by lawyers and friends with close ties to the Nazis. It generally is accepted that it was Bettauer's prominent criticism of antisemitism, encapsulated in particular in the high-profile book and film Stadt ohne Juden, that lay behind his murder. The court ordered Rothstock to be sent to a psychiatric clinic, which he left 18 months later a free man.

== Selected works ==
=== Major novels ===
- Im Banne von New York, 1907
- Im Kampf ums Glück, 1907 (reprint 1926)
- Auf heißem Boden, 1907
- Im Schatten des Todes, 1907 (reprint 1925)
- Aus den Tiefen der Weltstadt, 1907
- Faustrecht, 1919
- Hemmungslos, 1920 (reprint 1988)
- Bobbie auf der Fährte, 1921 (reprint 1926 under the title "Bobbie oder die Liebe eines Knaben")
- Die drei Ehestunden der Elizabeth Lehndorff, 1921
- Der Frauenmörder, 1922
- Der Herr auf der Galgenleiter, 1922
- Das blaue Mal, 1922
- Die Stadt ohne Juden, 1922 (reissued 1988, 1996)
- Der Kampf um Wien, 1922/23 (shortened edition under the title Ralph und Hilde 1926)
- Die lustigen Weiber von Wien, 1924
- Gekurbeltes Schicksal, 1924
- Die freudlose Gasse, 1924 (reissued 1988)
- Das entfesselte Wien, 1924
- Die schönste Frau der Welt, 1924
- Memoiren eines Hochstaplers, 1924
- Kampf ums Glück, 1926
- Gesammelte Werke in sechs Bänden ("Collected Works in Six Volumes"), Salzburg, 1980 (contains: Kampf um Wien/Das entfesselte Wien/Die freudlose Gasse/Die Stadt ohne Juden/Faustrecht/Hemmungslos)

=== Novellas ===
- Der Tod einer Grete und andere Novellen, 1926
- Geschichten aus dem Alltag, 1926

=== Stage plays ===
- Die Stadt ohne Juden (with Hans Saßmann), 1922
- Die blaue Liebe (with Klemens Weiß-Clewe), 1924

=== Newspapers / periodicals ===
- Er und Sie, 14 February – 13 March 1924
- Bettauers Wochenschrift 15 May 1924 – 26 August 1927
- Der Bettauer Almanach für 1925, 1925

== Film adaptations ==
- Faustrecht, Germany/Austria 1922, director: Karl Ehmann
- The Most Beautiful Woman in the World, Germany 1924, director: Richard Eichberg
- The City Without Jews, Austria 1924, director: Hans Karl Breslauer
- Das Abenteuer der Sybille Brant / Der Frauenmörder, Germany 1925, director: Carl Froelich
- Joyless Street, Germany 1925, director: Georg Wilhelm Pabst, with Greta Garbo
- The Bank Crash of Unter den Linden, Germany 1926, director: Paul Merzbach
- Andere Frauen, Austria 1928, director: Heinz Hanus
- Street Without Joy, France 1938, director: André Hugon (French remake of Joyless Street)

== Sources ==
- Hall, Murray G., 1978: Der Fall Bettauer. Vienna: Löcker Verlag. ISBN 3-85409-002-1
- Hwang, June J. "The Stranger, the Jew, and the City." In her Lost in Time: Locating the Stranger in German Modernity. Northwestern University Press, 2014, pp. 155–204.
- Koch, Werner, 1981: "Hinaus mit den Juden!". Hugo Bettauer und die unberechenbaren Folgen. In: Merkur, Stuttgart, 35 (1981), pp. 254–265.
