= Guadalajara International Film Festival =

Mexican film festival

Coordinates: 20°41′N 103°21′W

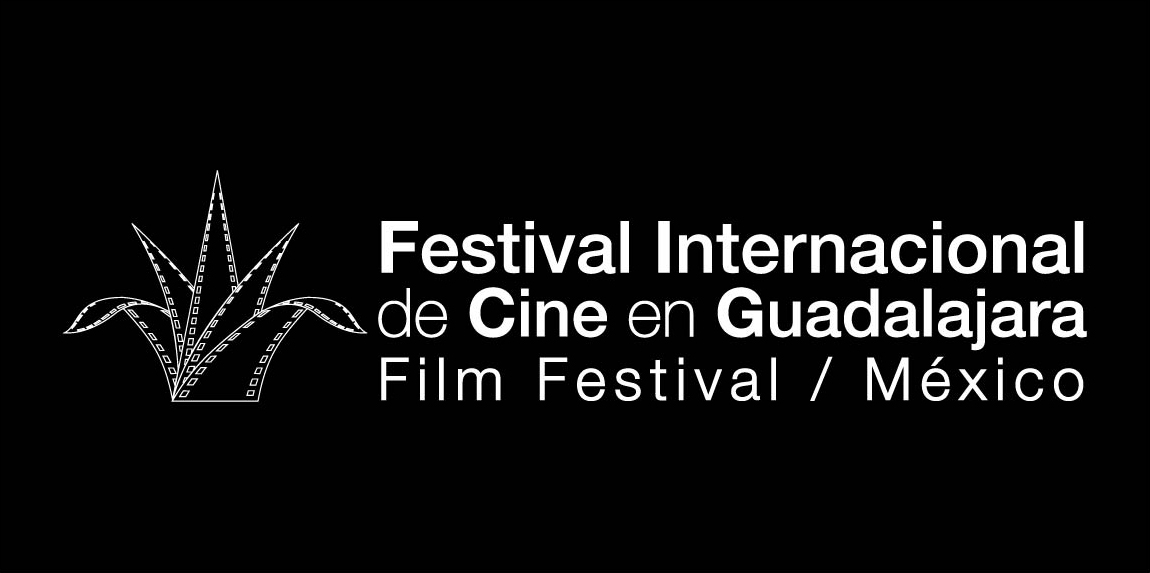

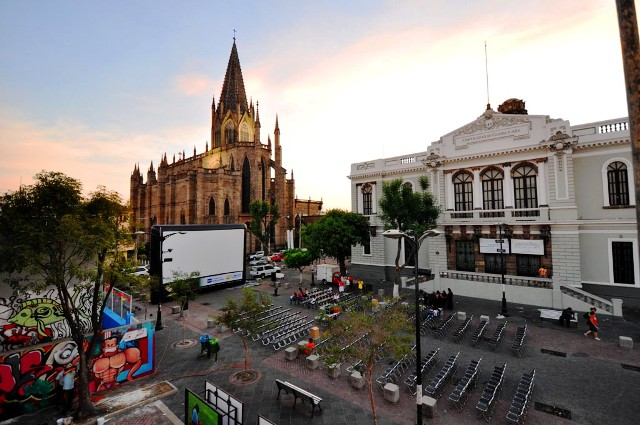
- Location: Guadalajara, Mexico
- Founded: 1986
- Most recent: 41st Guadalajara International Film Festival
- Awards: Mezcal
- No. of films: 306 (440 screenings); 45 countries (2011)
- Language: Spanish (mainly)
- Website: http://www.ficg.mx/

The Guadalajara International Film Festival (Spanish: Festival Internacional de Cine en Guadalajara) is a week-long film festival held each March in the Mexican city of Guadalajara since 1986.

The presence in Guadalajara of delegates from other important festivals from around the world has helped Mexican cinema to have a strong international presence in the last twenty years. The festival has also helped to revitalize the careers of some older more established Mexican and English speaking artists like Arturo Ripstein, Gabriel Figueroa, María Félix, Jaime Humberto Hermosillo, Silvia Pinal, Ignacio López Tarso, Ana Ofelia Murguía, Felipe Cazals, Jorge Fons, Katy Jurado, and Ismael Rodríguez as well as many others.

The festival features an official competition, similar to other festivals like Cannes, and an international jury presents awards in several category at the end of each festival, many of which are accompanied by cash prizes.

== Activities ==
- Guadalajara Film Market & Producers Network (Marché du Film, Festival de Cannes)
- Iberoamerican Film Market
- Short Up!!! (Short Film Program)
- Digital Space (Digital Cinema Keynotes)
- Iberoamerican Co-production Meeting
- Guadalajara Build (Post-production Market)
- Expotec (Technology Show)
- Iberoamerican Film Crossing Borders (Foreign Market Training)

== Sections and awards ==
- Mezcal Award: consisting of Mexican films or co-productions, from 2000 to 2012 a series of awards named Mayahuel were also given to Mexican films.
- Ibero-American Fiction Feature Film: consisting of fictional feature films from countries within Ibero-America.
- Ibero-American Documentary Feature Film: consisting of documentary feature films from countries within Ibero-America.
- Ibero-American Short Film: consisting of short films from countries within Ibero-America, including Mexico.
- Maguey Award: consisting of films with LGBT topics.
- Hecho en Jalisco: consisting of films produced in Jalisco.
- Socio-Environmental Cinema Award: consisting of films with socio-environmental topics.
- International Animation Feature Film: consisting of animated feature films from all over the world.
- Rigo Mora Award: consisting of animated short films from all over the world.

== Gallery ==
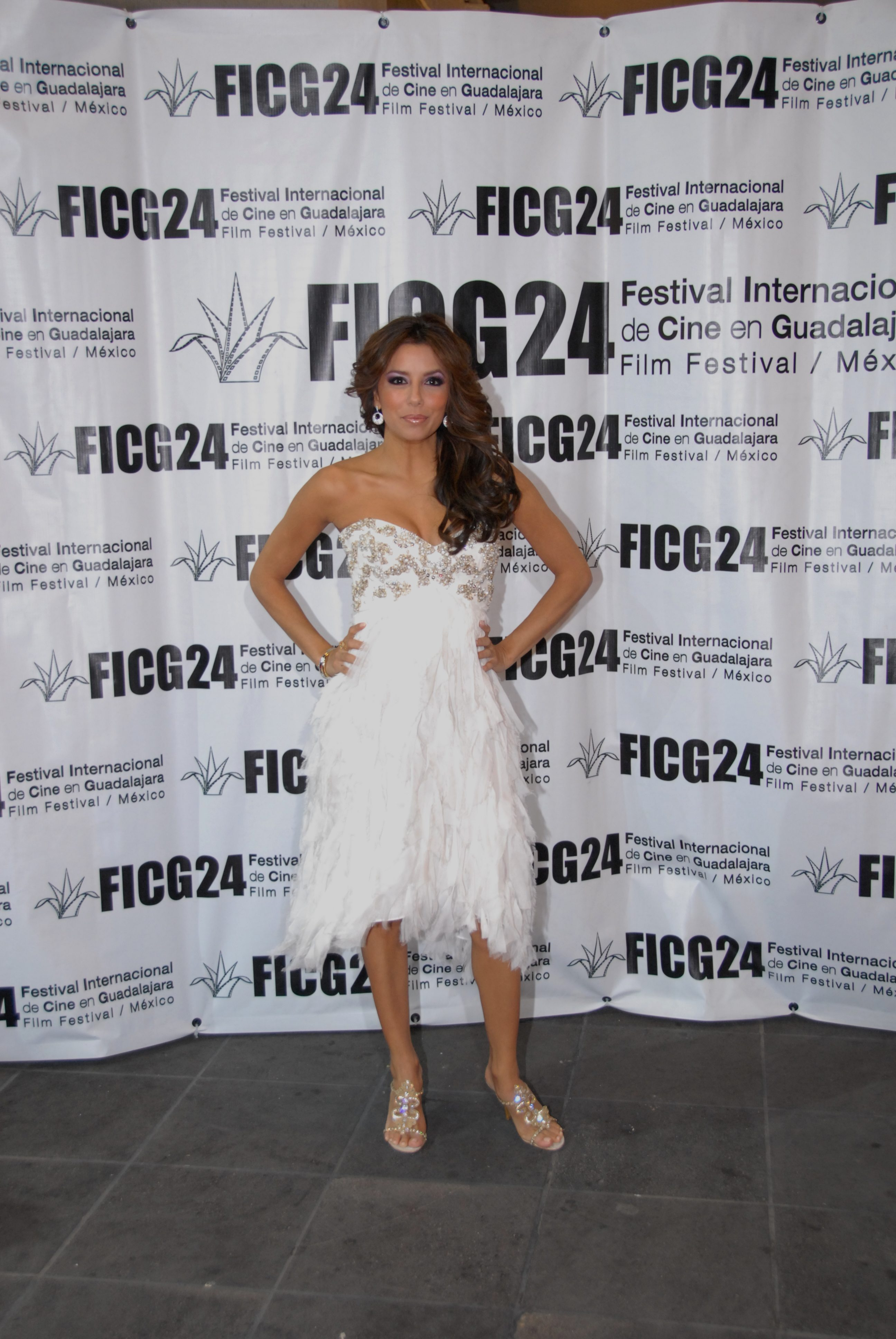
Eva Longoria at the 2009 festival.

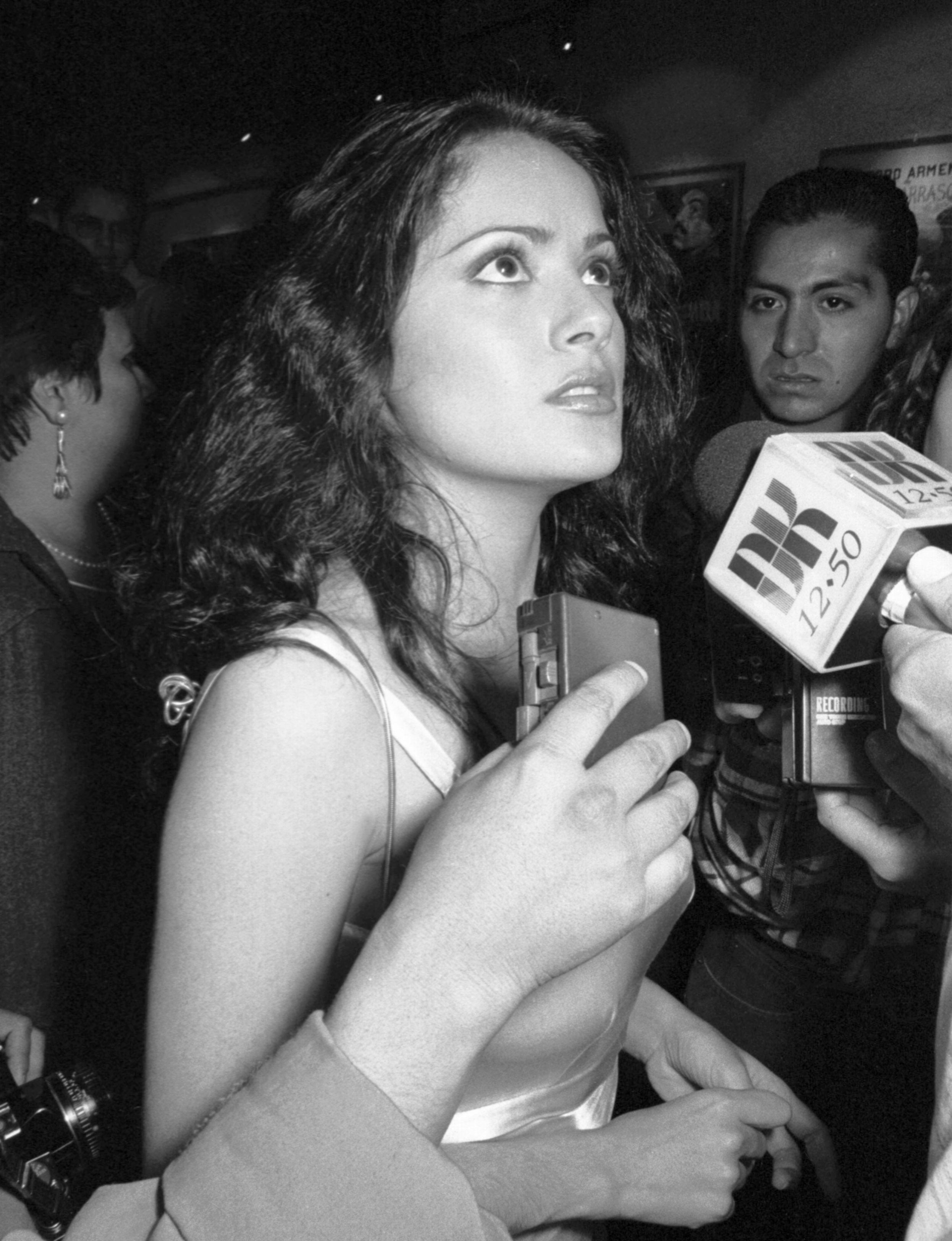
Salma Hayek at the festival.

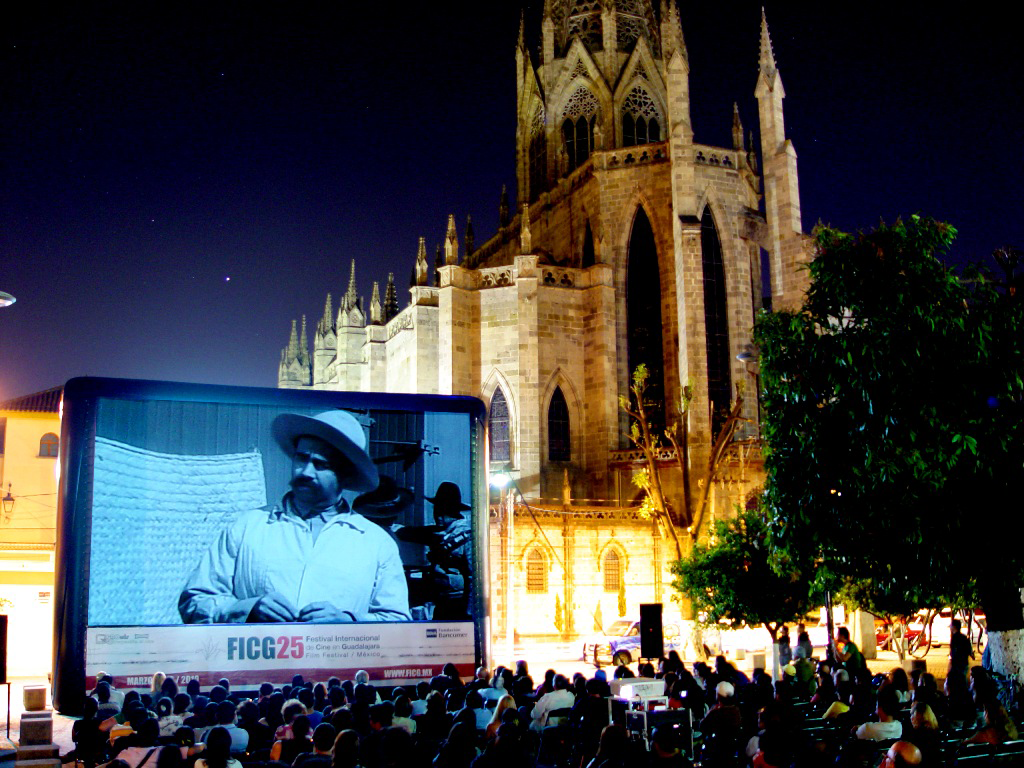
Open-air screening at Guadalajara Film Festival.

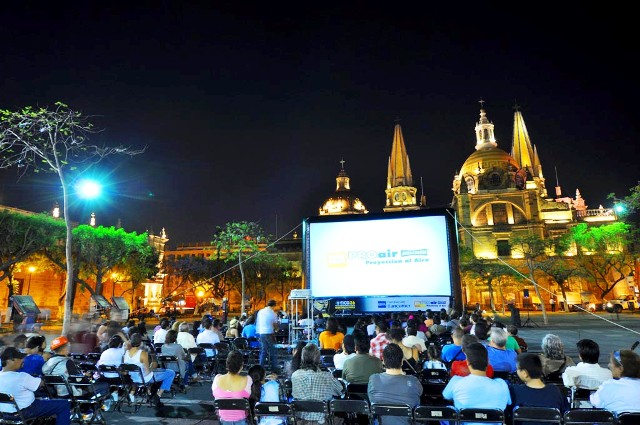
The Guadalajara International Film Festival offers outdoor free-access projections at certain points within the city.

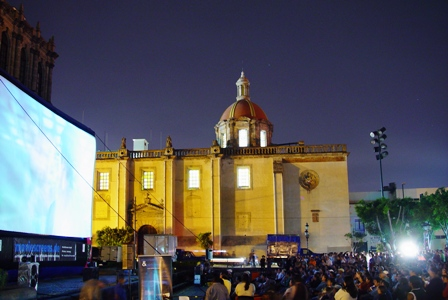
Open-Air-Cinema with an AIRSCREEN on the Guadalajara Film Festival.

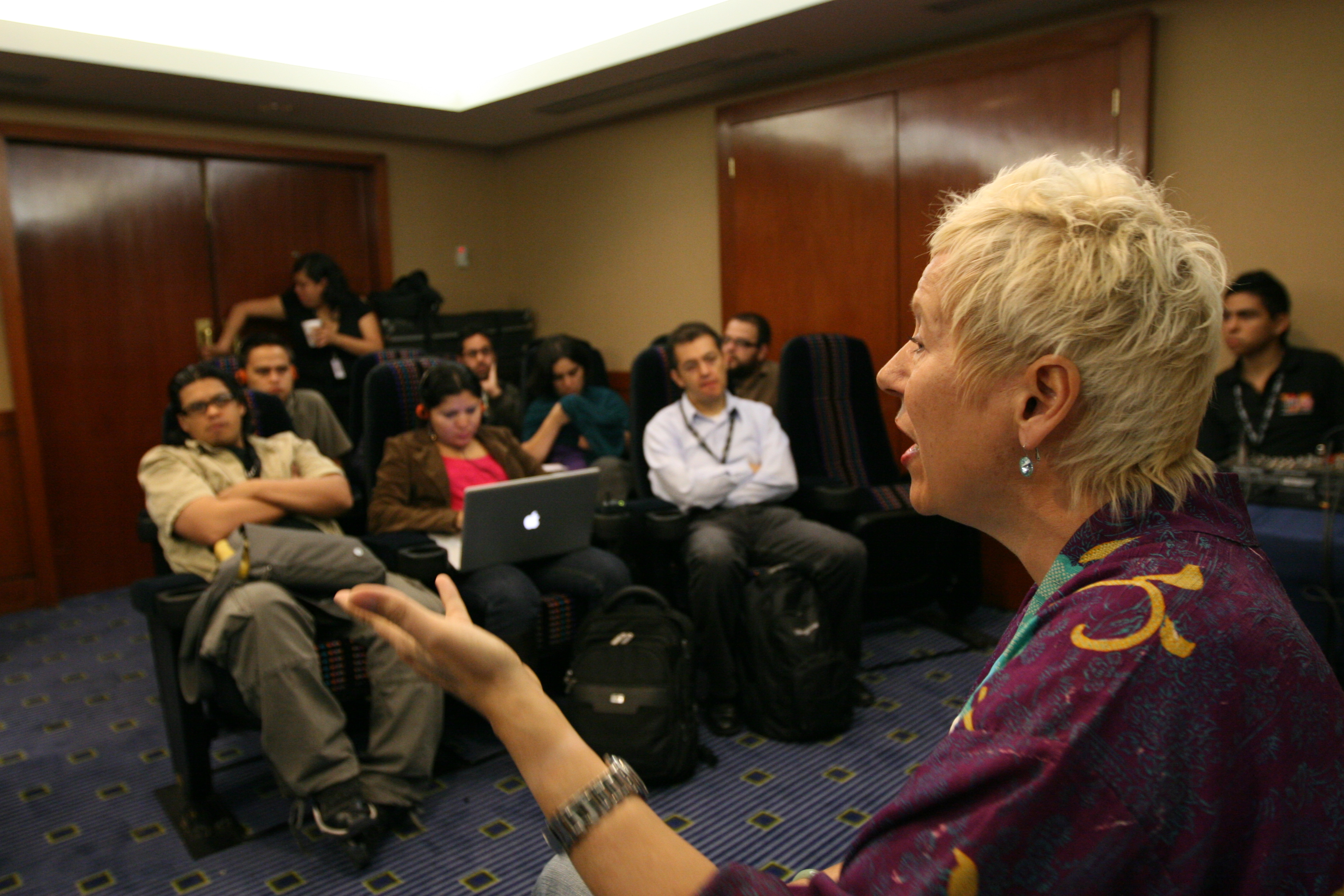
Doris Dörrie on the talent panel.

== Award winners ==
=== Mexican Feature Films Competition (Mezcal Award) ===
Best Film

- 2007 – Blue Eyelids (Párpados azules) by Ernesto Contreras
- 2008 – The Desert Within (Desierto adentro) by Rodrigo Plá
- 2009 – Voy a explotar by Gerardo Naranjo
- 2010 – Las buenas hierbas by María Novaro
- 2011 – The Prize (El premio) by Paula Markovitch
- 2012 – Un mundo secreto by Gabriel Mariño
- 2013 – Quebranto by Roberto Fiesco
- 2014 – Echo of the Mountain (Eco de la montaña) by Nicolás Echevarría
- 2015 – 600 Miles (600 millas) by Gabriel Ripstein
- 2016 – Panamerican Machinery by Joaquín del Paso
- 2017 – La libertad del diablo by Everardo González
- 2018 – Restos de viento by Jimena Montemayor Loyo
- 2019 – Midnight Family (Familia de medianoche) by Luke Lorentzen
- 2020 – Kokoloko by Gerardo Naranjo
- 2021 – This Is Not a Comedy (El comediante) by Rodrigo Guardiola and Gabriel Nuncio
- 2022 – The Realm of God by Claudia Sainte–Luce
- 2023 – Heroic (Heroico) by Everardo González
- 2024 – We Shall Not Be Moved (No nos moverán) by Pierre Saint Martin

Best Direction

- 2017 – Sofía Gómez Córdova for Los años azules
- 2018 – Jimena Montemayor Loyo for Restos de viento
- 2019 – Luke Lorentzen for Midnight Family (Familia de medianoche)
- 2021 – Antonio Hernández for Nos hicieron noche
- 2022 – Claudia Sainte–Luce for The Realm of God
- 2023 – Gisela Delgadillo for Kenya
- 2024 – Isabel Cristina Fregoso for The Muleteer (La arriera)

Best Actor

- 2017 – José Manuel Poncelis and Eligio Meléndez for I Dream in Another Language (Sueño en otro idioma)
- 2018 – Noé Hernández for Ocho de cada diez
- 2019 – Benny Emmanuel for Detrás de la montaña
- 2020 – Alfredo Castro for My Tender Matador (Tengo miedo torero)
- 2021 – Fernando Xavier de Casta for Plaza Catedral
- 2022 – Diego Armando Lara Lagunas for The Realm of God
- 2023 – Fernando Cuautle for Heroic (Heroico)

Best Actress

- 2017 – Paloma Domínguez for Los años azules
- 2018 – Daniela Schmidt for Ocho de cada diez
- 2019 – Diana Sedano for Yo necesito amor
- 2020 – Martha Reyes for Los lobos
- 2021 – Ilse Salas for Plaza Catedral
- 2022 – Marta Aura for Coraje
- 2023 – Rocío de la Mañana for Adolfo

Best Performance

- 2024 – Juan Ramón López for Shame (Vergüenza)

Best Cinematography

- 2017 – María Secco for La libertad del diablo
- 2018 – César Gutiérrez Miranda for La negrada
- 2019 – César Gutiérrez Miranda for Yo necesito amor
- 2020 – Sofía Oggioni for Tragic Jungle (Selva trágica)
- 2021 – María Secco for This Is Not a Comedy (El comediante)
- 2022 – Carlos Correa for The Realm of God
- 2023 – Santiago Sánchez for Mujeres del alba
- 2024 – María Sarasvati Herrera for The Muleteer (La arriera)

=== Ibero-American Feature Films Competition ===
Best Film

- 2002 – To the Left of the Father (Lavoura Arcaica) by Luiz Fernando Carvalho (Brazil)
- 2003 – El bonaerense by Pablo Trapero (Argentina)
- 2004 – Take My Eyes (Te doy mis ojos) by Icíar Bollaín (Spain)
- 2005 – Crónicas by Sebastián Cordero (Ecuador)
- 2006 – The Minder (El custodio) by Rodrigo Moreno (Argentina, Uruguay, France, Germany) & Cinema, Aspirins and Vultures (Cinema, Aspirinas e Urubus) by Marcelo Gomes (Brazil)
- 2007 – Blue Eyelids (Párpados azules) by Ernesto Contreras (Mexico)
- 2008 – 14 kilómetros by Gerardo Olivares (Spain)
- 2009 – The Milk of Sorrow (La teta asustada) by Claudia Llosa (Peru)
- 2010 – Portraits in a Sea of Lies (Retratos en un mar de mentiras) by Carlos Gaviria (Colombia)
- 2011 – Post Mortem by Pablo Larraín (Chile)
- 2012 – Back to Stay (Abrir puertas y ventanas) by Milagros Mumenthaler (Argentina)
- 2013 – Workers by José Luis Valle González (Mexico, Germany)
- 2014 – Ciencias naturales by Matías Lucchesi (Argentina)
- 2015 – Ixcanul by Jairo Bustamante (Guatemala, France)
- 2016 – Dark Beast (Oscuro animal) by Felipe Guerrero (Colombia)
- 2017 – Santa & Andres by Carlos Lechuga (Colombia, Cuba)
- 2018 – Killing Jesus (Matar a Jesús) by Laura Mora (Colombia)
- 2019 – Petra by Jaime Rosales (Spain)
- 2020 – Spider (Araña) by Andrés Wood (Chile, Argentina)
- 2021 – My Brothers Dream Awake (Mis hermanos sueñan despiertos) by Claudia Huaiquimilla (Chile)
- 2022 – Carajita by Silvina Schnicer and Ulises Porras (Dominican Republic, Argentina)
- 2023 – I Have Electric Dreams (Tengo sueños eléctricos) by Valentina Maurel (Costa Rica, Belgium, France)
- 2024 – Toll (Pedágio) by Carolina Markowicz (Brazil)

Special Jury Mention

- 2007 – Alice's House (A casa de Alice) by Chico Teixeira (Brazil)
- 2008 – The Other Side (A Outra Margem) by Luís Filipe Rocha (Portugal)
- 2009 – Our Beloved Month of August (Aquel querido mes de agosto) by Miguel Gomes (Portugal, France)
- 2010 – Zona sur by Juan Carlos Valdivia (Bolivia)
- 2011 – Juan Gentil by Laura Amelia Guzmán and Israel Cárdenas (Dominican Republic, Mexico, Germany)
- 2012 – Los pasos dobles by Isaki Lacuesta (Spain, Switzerland)
- 2013 – Quebranto by Roberto Fiesco & Xingu by Cao Hamburger (Brazil)
- 2014 – The Man of the Crowd (O Homem das Multidões) by Marcelo Gomes (Brazil)
- 2015 – The Thin Yellow Line (La delgada línea amarilla) by Celso R. García (Mexico)
- 2016 – The 4th Company (La 4ª Compañía) by Mitzi Vanessa Arreola and Amir Galván Cervera (Mexico)
- 2017 – Carpinteros by José María Cabral (Dominican Republic)
- 2018 – Vivir y otras ficciones by Jo Sol (Spain)
- 2019 – The Sharks (Los tiburones) by Lucia Garibaldi (Argentina, Uruguay, France)
- 2020 – Los lobos by Samuel Kishi (Mexico)
- 2023 – Sister & Sister (Las hijas) by Kattia González (Panamá, Chile)
- 2024 – The Other Way Around (Volveréis) by Jonás Trueba (Spain)

Best Direction

- 2002 – Luiz Fernando Carvalho for To the Left of the Father (Lavoura Arcaica) (Brazil)
- 2003 – Pablo Trapero for El bonaerense (Argentina)
- 2004 – Daniel Burman for Lost Embrace (El abrazo partido) (Argentina)
- 2006 – Isabel Coixet for The Secret Life of Words (La vida secreta de las palabras) (Spain)
- 2007 – Paulo Caldas for Deserto Feliz (Brazil, Germany)
- 2008 – Eliseo Subiela for Don't Look Down (No mires para abajo) (Argentina)
- 2009 – Chus Gutiérrez for Return to Hansala (Retorno a Hansala) (Spain)
- 2010 – Sebastián Cordero for Rage (Rabia) (Ecuador)
- 2011 – Fernando León de Aranoa for Amador (Spain)
- 2012 – Sebastian Cordero for Pescador (Ecuador)
- 2013 – Fernando Coimbra for A Wolf at the Door (O Lobo Atrás da Porta) (Brazil)
- 2015 – Jayro Bustamante for Ixcanul (Guatemala, France)
- 2016 – Felipe Guerrero for Dark Beast (Oscuro animal) (Colombia)
- 2017 – Joel Calero for One Last Afternoon (La última tarde) (Peru)
- 2018 – Anahí Berneri for Alanis (Argentina)
- 2019 – Jaime Rosales for Petra (Spain)
- 2020 – Juan Pablo Félix for Karnawal (Bolivia, Argentina, Brazil, Chile, Mexico, Norway, France)
- 2021 – Nicolás Postiglione for Immersion (Inmersión) (Chile, Mexico)
- 2022 – Silvina Schnicer and Ulises Porras for Carajita (Dominican Republic, Argentina)
- 2023 – Estibaliz Urresola Solaguren for 20,000 Species of Bees (20.000 especies de abejas) (Spain)
- 2024 – Bernardo Florim & Maju de Paiva for Seaside Avenue (Avenida Beira-Mar) (Brazil)

Best Actor

- 2005 – Damián Alcázar for Crónicas (Ecuador)
- 2006 – João Miguel for Cinema, Aspirins and Vultures (Cinema, Aspirinas e Urubus) (Brazil)
- 2007 – Selton Mello for Drained (O Cheiro do Ralo) (Brazil)
- 2008 – Marlon Moreno for Dog Eat Dog (Perro come perro) (Colombia)
- 2009 – Andrés Parra for Gabriel's Passion (La pasión de Gabriel) (Colombia)
- 2010 – Gustavo Sánchez Parra for Rage (Rabia) (Ecuador) & Pascual Loayza for Zona sur (Bolivia)
- 2011 – Alfredo Castro for Post Mortem (Chile)
- 2012 – Andrés Crespo for Pescador (Ecuador)
- 2013 – Ernesto Alterio for Clandestine Childhood (Infancia clandestina) (Argentina)
- 2014 – Gustavo Sánchez Parra for La tirisia (Mexico)
- 2015 – Joaquín Furriel for El patrón: radiografía de un crimen (Argentina)
- 2016 – Adrián Ladrón for The 4th Company (La 4ª Compañía) (Mexico)
- 2017 – Jean Jean for Carpinteros (Dominican Republic)
- 2018 – Luis Gerardo Méndez for Time Share (Tiempo compartido) (Mexico) & Giovanny Rodríguez for Killing Jesus (Matar a Jesús) (Colombia)
- 2019 – Darío Grandinetti for Rojo (Argentina)
- 2020 – Luis Tosar for Out in the Open (Intemperie) (Spain) & Alfredo Castro for Karnawal (Bolivia, Argentina, Brazil, Chile, Mexico, Norway, France)
- 2021 – Iván Cáceres for My Brothers Dream Awake (Mis hermanos sueñan despiertos) (Chile)
- 2022 – Nahuel Pérez Biscayart for One Year, One Night (Un año, una noche) (Spain, France)
- 2023 – Reinaldo Amién for I Have Electric Dreams (Tengo sueños eléctricos) (Costa Rica, Belgium, France)

Best Actress

- 2005 – Mirella Pascual for Whisky (Uruguay)
- 2006 – Fernanda Montenegro and Fernanda Torres for The House of Sand (Casa de areia) (Brazil)
- 2007 – Carla Ribas for Alice's House (A casa de Alice) (Brazil)
- 2008 – Maria D'Aires for The Other Side (A Outra Margem) (Portugal)
- 2009 – Magaly Solier for The Milk of Sorrow (La teta asustada) (Peru)
- 2010 – Paola Baldion for Portraits in a Sea of Lies (Retratos en un mar de mentiras) (Colombia) & Alma Blanco for La Yuma (Nicaragua)
- 2011 – Magaly Solier for Amador (Spain)
- 2012 – Francisca Gavilán for Violeta Went to Heaven (Violeta se fue a los cielos) (Chile)
- 2013 – Female ensemble cast for The Last Call (Tercera llamada) (Mexico)
- 2014 – Paula Hertzog and Paola Barrientos for Ciencias naturales (Argentina)
- 2015 – Claudia Muñiz, Marianela Pupo and Maribel García Garzón for Venecia (Cuba, Colombia)
- 2016 – Marleyda Soto, Luisa Vides Galiano and Jocelyn Meneses for Dark Beast (Oscuro animal) (Colombia)
- 2017 – Lola Amores for Santa & Andres (Colombia, Cuba)
- 2018 – Sofía Gala Castiglione for Alanis (Argentina)
- 2019 – Romina Bentancur for The Sharks (Los tiburones) (Argentina, Uruguay, France) & Bárbara Lennie for Petra (Spain)
- 2020 – Greta Fernández for A Thief's Daughter (La hija de un ladrón) (Spain)
- 2021 – María Romanillos for The Consequences (Las consecuencias) (Spain, Netherlands, Belgium)
- 2022 – Magnolia Núñez for Carajita (Dominican Republic, Argentina)
- 2023 – Beatriz Batarda for Great Yarmouth: Provisional Figures (Portugal, United Kingdom, France)

Best Performance

- 2024 – Maeve Jinkings for Toll (Pedágio) (Brazil)

Best Screenplay

- 2005 – Sebastian Cordero for Crónicas (Mexico)
- 2006 – Rodrigo Moreno for The Minder (El custodio) (Argentina, Uruguay, France, Germany)
- 2007 – Carlos Contreras for Blue Eyelids (Párpados azules) (Mexico)
- 2008 – Icíar Bollaín and Tatiana Rodríguez for Mataharis (Spain)
- 2009 – Chus Gutiérrez and Juan Carlos Rubio for Return to Hansala (Retorno a Hansala) (Spain)
- 2010 – Juan Carlos Valdivia for Zona sur (Bolivia)
- 2011 – Héctor Olivera for El mural (Argentina, Mexico)
- 2012 – Jaime Osorio Márquez for The Squad (Colombia)
- 2013 – Valentí Figueres for El efecto k, el montador de Stalin (Spain)
- 2014 – Matías Lucchesi and Gonzálo Salaya for Ciencias naturales (Argentina)
- 2015 – Celso R. García for The Thin Yellow Line (La delgada línea amarilla) (Mexico)
- 2016 – Marina Seresesky for The Open Door (La puerta abierta) (Spain)
- 2017 – Carlos Lechuga for Santa & Andres (Colombia, Cuba)
- 2018 – Martín Boulocq for Eugenia (Bolivia)
- 2019 – Lucía Garibaldi for The Sharks (Los tiburones) (Argentina, Uruguay, France)
- 2020 – Diego Vega Vidal and Daniel Vega Vidal for La bronca (Perú, Colombia)
- 2021 – Claudia Huaiquimilla and Pablo Greene for My Brothers Dream Awake (Mis hermanos sueñan despiertos) (Chile)
- 2022 – Alejandro Loayza Grisi for Utama (Bolivia)
- 2023 – Ricardo Adolfo and Marco Martins for Great Yarmouth: Provisional Figures (Portugal, United Kingdom, France)
- 2024 – Fernando del Razo & Santiago Lozano Álvarez for I Saw Three Black Lights (Yo vi tres luces negras) (Colombia)

Best Cinematography

- 2005 – Miguel Joan Littin for La última luna (Chile)
- 2006 – Willi Bhenish for Cuatro mujeres descalzas (Argentina)
- 2007 – Daniel Aranyó for The Distance (La distancia) (Spain)
- 2008 – Pedro Farkas for Os Desafinados
- 2009 – Álex Catalán for Camino (Spain)
- 2010 – Enrique Chediak for Rage (Rabia) (Ecuador) & Mauro Pinheiro Jr. for Os Famosos e os Duendes da Morte (Brazil, France)
- 2011 – Sergio Armstrong for Post Mortem (Chile)
- 2012 – Mauro Pinheiro Jr. for Southwest (Brazil)
- 2013 – Kiko de la Rica for Blancanieves (Spain)
- 2014 – Ivo Lopes Araújo for The Man of the Crowd (O Homem das Multidões) (Brazil)
- 2015 – Juan Carlos Gil for ¡Que viva la música! (Colombia, Mexico)
- 2016 – Fernando Lockett for Dark Beast (Oscuro animal) (Colombia)
- 2017 – Daniela Cajías for Two Irenes (As duas Irenes) (Brazil)
- 2018 – Óscar Catacora for Eternity (Wiñaypacha) (Peru)
- 2019 – Luis Armando Arteaga for Tremors (Temblores) (Guatemala)
- 2020 – Nicolas Wong for La Llorona (Guatemala)
- 2021 – Sergio Armstrong for Immersion (Inmersión) (Chile, Mexico)
- 2022 – Iván Gierasinchuk and Sergio Amstrong for Carajita (Dominican Republic, Argentina)
- 2023 – Not presented
- 2024 – Juan Velásquez for I Saw Three Black Lights (Yo vi tres luces negras) (Colombia)

Best First Feature Film

- 2004 – A Day Without a Mexican (Un día sin mexicanos) by Sergio Arau (Mexico)
- 2005 – Kept and Dreamless (Las mantenidas sin sueños) by Martín Desalvo and Vera Fogwill (Argentina)
- 2006 – Lo más bonito y mis mejores años by Martín Boulocq (Bolivia)
- 2007 – Lo que sé de Lola by Javier Rebollo (Spain)
- 2008 – The Pope's Toilet (El baño del Papa) by César Charlone and Enrique Fernández (Uruguay, Brazil, France)
- 2009 – Voy a explotar by Gerardo Naranjo (Mexico)
- 2010 – La Yuma by Florence Jaugey (Nicaragua)
- 2011 – El Dedo by Sergio Teubal (Argentina)
- 2012 – Transeunte by Eryk Rocha (Brazil)
- 2013 – Tanta agua by Ana Guevara and Leticia Jorge (Uruguay, Mexico, Netherlands)
- 2014 – Los Ángeles by Damian John Harper (Mexico)
- 2015 – El patrón: radiografía de un crimen by Sebastián Schindel (Argentina)
- 2016 – La granja by Ángel Manuel Soto (Puerto Rico)
- 2017 – Two Irenes (As duas Irenes) by Fabio Meira (Brazil)
- 2018 – Eternity (Wiñaypacha) by óscar Catacora (Peru)
- 2019 – Carmen & Lola by Arantxa Echevarría (Spain)
- 2020 – Piola by Luis Alejandro Pérez (Chile)
- 2021 – Immersion (Inmersión) by Nicolás Postiglione (Chile, Mexico)
- 2022 – Utama by Alejandro Loayza Grisi (Bolivia)
- 2023 – 20,000 Species of Bees (20.000 especies de abejas) by Estibaliz Urresola Solaguren (Spain)
- 2024 – Natural Phenomena (Fenómenos naturales) by Marcos Díaz Sosa (Cuba, Argentina)

=== Ibero-American Documentary Films Competition ===
Best Ibero-American Documentary Film

- 2004 – The Basque Ball: Skin Against Stone (La pelota vasca) by Julio Medem (Spain) & De niños by Joaquim Jordà (Spain)
- 2005 – El inmortal by Mercedes Moncada (Mexico) & Soy Cuba or el mamut siberian by Vicente Ferraz (Brazil)
- 2006 – In the Pit (En el hoyo) by Juan Carlos Rulfo (Mexico)
- 2007 – Accidente by Cao Guimarães and Pablo Lobato (Brazil)
- 2008 – Vengo de un avión que cayó en las montañas by Gonzalo Arijón (Uruguay, Spain, France)
- 2009 – Unidad 25 by Alejo Hoijman (Argentina)
- 2010 – Entre a Luz e a Sombra by Luciana Burlamaqui (Brazil)
- 2011 – Nostalgia for the Light (Nostalgia de la luz) by Patricio Guzmán (Chile, France, Germany)
- 2012 – Long Live the Antipodes! (¡Vivan las Antipodas!) by Viktor Kossakovsky (Argentina, Chile, Germany, Netherlands)
- 2013 – El otra día by Ignacio Agüero (Chile)
- 2014 – La última estación by Catalina Vergara and Cristian Soto (Chile)
- 2015 – Tea Time (La once) by Maite Alberdi (Chile, United States)
- 2016 – El charro de Toluquilla by José Villalobos Romero (Mexico)
- 2017 – La libertad del diablo by Everardo González (Mexico)
- 2018 – La línea de la sombra by Nicolás Combarro (Spain)
- 2019 – Cine Moroccos by Ricardo Calil (Brazil)
- 2020 – El canto de las mariposas by Núria Frigola (Peru)
- 2021 – El cielo está rojo by Francina Carbonell (Chile)
- 2022 – Alis by Clare Weiskopf and Nicolás Van Hemelryck (Colombia, Romania, Chile)
- 2023 – Samuel y luz by Vinícius Girnys (Brazil, France)
- 2024 – The Fabulous Gold Harvesting Machine (La fabulosa máquina de cosechar oro) by Alfredo Pourailly de la Plaza (Chile)

Special Mention

From 2007 to 2012, two special mentions were presented, one for a Mexican documentary film and other for an Ibero-American one.

- 2007 – Súper amigos by Arturo Pérez Torres (Mexico) & Los ladrones viejos by Everardo González (Mexico)
- 2008 – Niño Fidencio... de Roma a Espinazo by Juan Farré (Mexico) & Lucio by Aitor Arregi Galdos and José Mari Goenada (Spain)
- 2009 – El viaje del cometa by Ivonne Fuentes Mendoza (Mexico)
- 2010 – Perdida by Viviana García Besné (Mexico) & Havanyork by Luciano Larobina (Mexico) & Cuchillo de palo by Renate Costa (Spain)
- 2011 – Agnus Dei: Cordero de Dios by Alejandra Sánchez (Mexico); Circo by Aaron Sock (Mexico) & Al final de la escapada by Albert Solé (Spain)
- 2012 – Carrière, 250 metros by Juan Carlos Rulfo and Natalia Gil; El paciente interno by Alejandro Solar (Mexico) & El salvavidas by Maite Alberdi (Chile)
- 2013 – Elena by Petra Costa (Brazil)
- 2014 – Echo of the Mountain (Eco de la montaña) by Nicolás Echevarría (Mexico)
- 2015 – Juanicas by Karina García Casanova (Mexico, Canada)
- 2016 – Paciente by Jorge Caballero (Colombia, Spain)
- 2017 – Adriana's Pact (El pacto de Adriana) by Lissette Orozco (Chile)
- 2018 – El espanto by Pablo Aparo and Martín Bechimol (Argentina)
- 2019 – El cuarto reino de Adán Aliaga and Álex Lora (Spain)
- 2020 – El segundo entierro de Alejandrino de Raúl Soto Rodríguez (Colombia)
- 2021 – Vals de Santo Domingo by Tatiana Fernández Geara (Dominican Republic)
- 2022 – La playa de los enchaquirados by Iván Mora Manzano (Ecuador)

Best Direction

- 2021 – Luiz Bolognesi for A Última Floresta (Brazil)
- 2022 – Marc Sempere-Moya and Leire Apellaniz López for Canto cósmico. Niño de elche (Spain)
- 2023 – Pau Faus for Fauna (Spain)
- 2024 – Macu Machín for The Undergrowth (La hojarasca) (Spain)

Best Cinematography

- 2021 – Eryk Rocha and Jorge Chechile for Edna (Brazil)
- 2022 – Víctor Mares for Para su tranquilidad haga su propio museo (Panama)
- 2023 – Nico Miranda and Fernando Lorenzale for The Castle (El castillo) (Argentina, Francia)
- 2024 – Laura Basombrío for Souls (Las almas) (Argentina)

Best Mexican Documentary Film

- 2007 – Los ladrones viejos by Everardo González
- 2008 – Trazando Aleida by Christiana Bukhard
- 2009 – Los que se quedan by Carlos Hagerman and Juan Carlos Rulfo
- 2010 – Presumed Guilty (Presunto culpable) by Roberto Hernández and Geoffrey Smith
- 2011 – Morir de pie by Jacaranda Correa
- 2012 – Cuatres de Australia by Everardo González

=== Short Films Competition ===
Best Ibero-American Short Film

- 2003 – Los tripulantes by Daniel Henríquez (Chile)
- 2004 – Sueños by Daniel Guzmán (Spain)
- 2006 – Sarean by Asier Altuna (Spain)
- 2007 – Beijo de sal by Fellipe Gamarano Barbosa (Brazil)
- 2008 – Diente por ojo by Elving Holmboe (Spain)
- 2009 – Karai Norte by Marcelo Martinessi (Paraguay)
- 2010 – Alijuna by Cristina Escoda (Colombia)
- 2011 – Ensolarado by Ricardo Targino (Brazil)
- 2012 – Minutos 200 by Franz Benítez (Colombia)
- 2013 – La gallina que burló al sistema by Quico Meirelles (Brazil)
- 2014 – Nunca regreses by Leonardo Díaz (Mexico)
- 2015 – Castillo y el Armado by Pedro Harres (Brazil)
- 2016 – Los Ángeles 1991 by Miguel de Olaso and Bruno Zacarías (Spain, United States)
- 2017 – Aya by Francesca Canepa Sarmiento (Peru)
- 2018 – El escarabajo al final de la calle by Joan Vives (Spain)
- 2019 – Bodas de oro by Lorenzo Tocco (Uruguay)
- 2020 – La medallita by Martín Aletta (Argentina)
- 2021 – Before I Die by Iker Esteibarlanda (Spain)
- 2022 – Adeus, Calon by Joâo Borges (Brazil)
- 2023 – An Avocado Pit (Um coroço de abacate) by Ary Zara (Portugal)

Special Mention

- 2007 – Primera comunión by Daniel Eduviges Carrera (Mexico) & Hamac Caziim by Gerónimo Barriga (Mexico)
- 2008 – Primer movimiento para 20 hombres en un cuarto vacío by Gabriel Herrera (Mexico) & Un ramo by Juliana Rojas and Marco Dutra (Brazil)
- 2010 – Lupano Leyva by Felipe Gómez (Mexico)
- 2011 – La otra Emma by Jashua A. Camarera (Mexico) & Los teleféricos by Federico Actis (Argentina)
- 2014 – Zafo by Pablo Andrés Orta Zamora (Mexico9
- 2015 – Trémulo by Roberto Fiesco (Mexico)
- 2016 – El ocaso de Juan by Omar Deneb Juárez Vargas (Mexico)
- 2017 – Lucha by Eddie Rubio (Mexico) & Berta Vive by Katia Lara Pineda (Honduras)
- 2019 – Kyoko by Marcos Cabotá and Joan Bover (Spain)
- 2020 – Lunas de marte by David Desola (Spain)
- 2021 – Manchester Acatitla by Selma Cervantes (Mexico)

Best Mexican Short Film

- 1996 – Novia mía by Rodrigo Plá
- 1997 – Rastros by Diego Muñóz
- 1998 – Sin sostén by René Castillo and Antonio Urrutia
- 1999 – Ondas hertzianas by Ernesto Contreras
- 2000 – El milagro by Ernesto Contreras
- 2001 – Hasta los huesos by René Castillo
- 2002 – La milpa by Patricia Riggen & ¿Y cómo es el? by Issa García Ascot
- 2003 – La cumbre by Jorge Fons
- 2004 – La luna de Antonio by Diana Cardozo
- 2005 – El viejo by Paula Chaurand & La cola entre las patas by Carlos Sama
- 2006 – La leche y el agua by Celso R. García
- 2007 – Tiene la tarde ojos by Carlos Sama
- 2008 – Café Paraíso by Alonso Ruizpalacios
- 2009 – El tío Facundo by Alejandro Cachoúa
- 2010 – Si maneja de noche procure ir acompañado by Isabel Muñoz Cota
- 2011 – Mari Pepa by Samuel Kishi Leopo
- 2012 – Lucy vs. Los límites de la voz by Mónica Herrera

=== Animated Short Films (Rigo Mora Award) ===
Best Animated Short Film

- 2007 – Niebla by Emilio Ramos (Spain)
- 2008 – Jacinta by Karla Castañeda (Mexico)
- 2009 – Jaulas by Juan José Medina (Mexico)
- 2010 – Luna by Raúl Cárdenas and Rafael Cárdenas (Mexico)
- 2011 – Mutatio by León Fernández (Mexico)
- 2012 – Un ojo by Lorenza Manrique (Mexico)
- 2013 – Electrodoméstico by Erik de Luna (Mexico)
- 2014 – El modelo de Pickman by Pablo Ángeles (Mexico)
- 2015 – Zimbo by Juan José Medina and Rita Basulto (Mexico)
- 2016 – Los gatos by Alejandro Ríos (Mexico)
- 2017 – Cerulia by Sofía Carrillo (Mexico)
- 2018 – 32-Rbit by Victor Orozco Ramírez (Mexico)
- 2019 – Guaxuma by Nara Normande (France)
- 2020 – The Physics of Sorrow by Theodore Ushev (Canada)
- 2021 – Bestia by Hugo Covarrubias (Chile)
- 2022 – Ice Merchants by João Gonzalez (Portugal, France, United Kingdom)
- 2023 – Carne de Dios by Patricio Plaza (Argentina, Mexico)
- 2024 – The Family Portrait by Lea Vidakovic (Croatia, France, Serbia)

Special Mention

- 2007 – Juanito bajo el naranjo by Juan Carlos Villamizar (Colombia); Lapsus by Juan Pablo Zaramella (Argentina) & El viaje de Said by Coke Riobóo (Spain)
- 2014 – La última cena by Vanessa Quintanilla (Mexico)
- 2020 – Carne de Camila Kater (Brazil, Spain)
- 2021 – Steakhouse by Špela Čadež (Slovenia, France, Germany)
- 2022 – Zoon by Jonatan Schwenk (Germany) & My Love Affair ith Marriage by Signe Baumane (Latvia, United States, Luxembourg)
- 2023 – Ninety-Five Senses by Jared Hess & Jerusha Hess (United States)
- 2024 – Percebes by Alexandra Ramires & Laura Gonçalves (Portugal)

=== International Animated Feature Films Competition ===
Best International Animated Film

- 2019 – Mirai (未来のミライ / Mirai no Mirai) by Mamoru Hosoda (Japan)
- 2020 – Josep by Jean-Louis Milesi (France, Belgium, Spain)
- 2021 – My Sunny Maad (Moje slunce Mad) by Michaela Pavlátová (Czequia, Slovakia, France)
- 2022 – Nayola by José Miguel Ribeiro (Portugal, Belgium, France, Netherlands)
- 2023 – Chicken for Linda! (Linda veut du poulet!) by Chiara Malta and Sébastien Laudenbach (France, Italy)
- 2024 – Flow (Straume) by Gints Zilbalodis (Latvia, France)
- 2025 – Olivia & the Clouds by Tomás Pichardo Espaillat (Dominican Republic)

Special Mention

- 2020 – The Bears' Famous Invasion of Sicily (La famosa invasione degli orsi in Sicilia) by Lorenzo Mattotti (Italy, France)
- 2021 – Bob Cuspe: Nós Não Gostamos de Gente by Cesar Cabral (Brazil)
- 2023 – No Dogs or Italians Allowed (Interdit aux chiens et aux italiens) by Alain Ughetto (France, Switzerland, Italy, Belgium, Portugal)
- 2024 – Tender Metalheads (Heavies tendres) by Juanjo Sáez, Carlos Pérez-Reche & Joan Tomás Monfort (Spain)
- 2025 – Endless Cookie by Peter Scriver, Seth Scriver (Canada)

=== Maguey Award ===
Best Feature Film

- 2014 – Tom at the Farm (Tom à la ferme) by Xavier Dolan (Canada, France)
- 2015 – Something Must Break (Nånting måste gå sönder) by Ester Martin Bergsmark (Sweden)
- 2016 – Paris 05:59: Théo & Hugo (Théo et Hugo dans le même bateau) by Olivier Ducastel and Jacques Martineau (France)
- 2017 – Body Electric (Corpo Elétrico) by Marcelo Caetano (Brazil)
- 2018 – Hard Paint (Tinta bruta) by Marcio Reolon and Filipe Matzembacher (Brazil)
- 2019 – One Taxi Ride by C. K. Mak (Mexico, Singapore)
- 2020 – Port Authority by Danielle Lessovitz (United States, France)
- 2021 – Our Bodies Are Your Battlefields by Isabelle Solas (France)
- 2022 – My Emptiness and I (Mi vacío y yo) by Adrián Silvestre (Spain)
- 2023 – Kenya by Gisela Delgadillo (Mexico)
- 2024 – Toll (Pedágio) by Carolina Markowicz (Brazil)

Special Mention

- 2014 – Julia by J. Jackie Baier (Germany, Lithuania)
- 2015 – Seashore (Beira-Mar) by Marcio Reolon and Filipe Matzembacher (Brazil)
- 2016 – Neon Bull (Boi neon) by Gabriel Mascaro (Brazil)
- 2017 – Santa & Andres by Carlos Lechuga (Colombia, Cuba)
- 2019 – Memories of My Body (Kucumbu Tubuh Indahku) by Garin Nugroho (Indonesia)
- 2020 – No Hard Feelings (Futur Drei) by Faraz Shariat (Germany)
- 2021 – Colors of Tobi (Tobi Színei) by Alexa Bakony (Hungary)
- 2022 – Camila saldrá esta noche by Inés Barrionuevo (Argentina)
- 2023 – Medusa Deluxe by Thomas Hardiman (United Kingdom)
- 2024 – Seaside Avenue (Avenida Beira-Mar) by Bernardo Florim & Maju de Paiva (Brazil)

Special Jury Prize

- 2024 – Crossing by Levan Akin (Sweden, Georgia)

Best Performance

- 2017 – Jella Haase for Looping (Germany)
- 2018 – Elliot Page (as Ellen Page) for My Days of Mercy (United States)
- 2019 – Valerie Pachner for The Ground Beneath My Feet (Der Boden unter den Füßen) (Austria)
- 2020 – Alfredo Castro for My Tender Matador (Tengo miedo torero) (Chile, Mexico, Argentina)
- 2021 – Lara Tremouroux for Medusa (Brazil)
- 2022 – The cast of Beautiful Beings (Berdreymi) (Iceland, Denmark, Sweden, Netherlands, Czequia)
- 2023 – The cast of 20,000 Species of Bees (20.000 especies de abejas) (Spain)
- 2024 – The cast of The Astronaut Lovers (Los amantes astronautas) (Spain)

=== Mayahuel Award ===
From 2000 to 2012 a series of awards under the name of Mayahuel Awards were given to Mexican films within the festival. These awards would eventually be replaced by the current Mezcal Awards.

Best Film

- 2000 – De ida y vuelta by Salvador Aguirre
- 2001 – De la calle by Gerardo Tort
- 2002 – Gabriel Orozco by Juan Carlos Martín
- 2003 – Recuerdos by Marcela Arteaga & La pasión de María Elena by Mercedes Moncada
- 2004 – Duck Season (Temporada de patos) by Fernando Eimbcke
- 2005 – El mago by Jaime Aparicio
- 2006 – La Niña en la Piedra by Marisa Sistach Peret
- 2007 – Bad Habits (Malos hábitos) by Simón Bross
- 2008 – The Desert Within (Desierto adentro) by Rodrigo Plá
- 2009 – Viaje redondo by Gerardo Tort
- 2010 – Perpetuum mobile by Nicolás Pereda
- 2011 – The Prize (El premio) by Paula Markovitch
- 2012 – Mariachi Gringo (El mariachi gringo) by Tom Gustafson

Best Director

- 2000 – Benjamín Cann for Crónica de un desayuno
- 2001 – Laura Mañá for Compassionate Sex (Sexo por compasión)
- 2002 – Juan Carlos Martín for Gabriel Orozco
- 2003 – Julián Hernández for A Thousand Clouds of Peace (Mil nubes de paz cercan el cielo, amor, jamás acabarás de ser amor)
- 2004 – Fernando Eimbcke for Duck Season (Temporada de patos)
- 2005 – Ricardo Benet for Noticias lejanas
- 2006 – Javier Patrón for Fuera del cielo
- 2007 – Enrique Begne FOR Dos abrazos
- 2008 – Fernando Eimbcke for Lake Tahoe
- 2009 – Alberto Cortés for Corazón del tiempo
- 2010 – Carlos Carrera for De la infancia
- 2011 – Odin Salazar for Burros
- 2012 – Everardo Gout for Días de gracia

Best Actor

- 2000 – Fernando Luján for En el país de no pasa nada
- 2001 – Luis Fernando Peña for De la calle
- 2002 – Bruno Nichir for Ciudades oscuras
- 2003 – Damián Alcázar for The Crime of Padre Amaro (El crimen del padre Amaro)
- 2004 – Enrique Arreola for Duck Season (Temporada de patos) & Roberto Espejo for Puños rosas
- 2005 – Erando González for El mago
- 2008 – Mario Zaragoza for The Desert Within (Desierto adentro)
- 2009 – Patricio Castillo for Crónicas chilangas
- 2010 – Damián Alcázar for De la infancia & Unax Ugalde for Cefalópodo
- 2011 – Jesús Ochoa for Between Us (Aquí entre nos)
- 2012 – Kuno Becker for Espacio interior

Best Actress

- 2000 – Julieta Egurrola for En el país de no pasa nada
- 2001 – Karina Gidi for Demasiado amor & Ximena Ayala for Violet Perfume: No One Is Listening (Perfume de violetas)
- 2002 – Gabriela Canudas for La mujer del pueblo
- 2003 – Katy Jurado for Un secreto de Esperanza
- 2004 – Danny Perea for Duck Season (Temporada de patos)
- 2005 – Maya Zapata for El mago
- 2008 – Dolores Heredia for Enemigos íntimos, Conozca la cabeza de Juan Pérez and The Desert Within (Desierto adentro)
- 2009 – Teresa Ruiz for Viaje redondo
- 2010 – Úrsula Pruneda for Las buenas hierbas
- 2011 – Paula Galinelli Hertzog for The Prize (El premio)
- 2012 – Martha Higareda for Mariachi Gringo (El mariachi gringo)

Best Screenplay

- 2003 – Carlos Reygadas for Japón
- 2004 – Fernando Eimbcke for Duck Season (Temporada de patos)
- 2005 – Marcel Sisniega for El baile de la iguana
- 2008 – Rodrigo Plá and Laura Santullo for The Desert Within (Desierto adentro)
- 2009 – Carlos Enderle for Crónicas chilangas
- 2010 – María Novaro for Las buenas hierbas
- 2011 – Jesús Magaña for Abolición de la propiedad
- 2012 – Miguel Bonilla for Diente por diente

Best Cinematography

- 2002 – Ángel Goded for El gavilán de la sierra
- 2003 – Everardo González for La canción del pulque
- 2004 – Ciro Cabello and Alejandro Cantú for Adán y Eva (todavía)
- 2005 – Martín Boege for Noticias lejanas
- 2008 – Serguei Saldívar Tanaka for The Desert Within (Desierto adentro)
- 2009 – Tobias Dantum for Voy a explotar
- 2010 – Gerardo Barroso for Las buenas hierbas
- 2011 – Alejandro Cantú for Burros
- 2012 – Jerónimo Rodríguez for Todo mundo tiene a alguien menos yo

Best Art Direction

- 2002 – Gloria Carrasco for Cuentos de hadas para dormir cocodrilos
- 2003 – Alejandro Reygadas for Japón
- 2004 – Hania Robledo for Puños rosas

Best Score

- 2002 – Eduardo Gamboa for Ciudades oscuras
- 2003 – Rosino Serrano for The Crime of Padre Amaro (El crimen del padre Amaro)
- 2004 – Alejandro Rosso for Duck Season (Temporada de patos)

Best Sound

- 2002 – Antonio Isordia and Christian Manzuto for Gabriel Orozco
- 2003 – Aurora Ojeda for A Thousand Clouds of Peace (Mil nubes de paz cercan el cielo, amor, jamás acabarás de ser amor)
- 2004 – Lena Esquenazi for Duck Season (Temporada de patos)

Best Editing

- 2002 – Roberto Bolado for Ciudades oscuras
- 2003 – Juan Manuel Figueroa for La canción del pulque
- 2004 – Daniel A. Fort for A Day Without a Mexican (Un día sin mexicanos)

Best First Feature Film

- 2004 – Adán y Eva (todavía) by Iván Ávila Dueñas
- 2006 – Más que a nada en el mundo by Andrés León Becker and Javier Solar
- 2007 – Partes usadas by Aarón Fernández
- 2008 – Conozca la cabeza de Juan Pérez by Emilio Portes
- 2009 – Crónicas chilangas by Carlos Enderle
- 2010 – Cefalópodo by Rubén Imaz
- 2011 – Asalto al cine by Iria Gómez Concheiro
- 2012 – The Fantastic World of Juan Orol (El fantástico mundo de Juan Orol) by Sebastián del Amo

== See also ==
- Film festivals in North and Central America
- 40th Guadalajara International Film Festival
