= Araceli =

Araceli or Aracely, a Spanish female name from Latin Ara Cœli, "the altar in heaven", may refer to:

== Politicians ==
- Aracely Leuquén Uribe, a Chilean politician
- Araceli Velazquez, a Mexican politician
- Araceli Torres Flores, a Mexican politician

== Athletes ==
- Araceli Castro, a Mexican athlete
- Araceli Navarro, a Spanish fencer
- Araceli Segarra, a Spanish climber

== Artists/Entertainers ==
- Araceli González, Argentine model, actress and TV host
- Araceli Gilbert, Ecuadorian artist
- Araceli "Arly" Jover, Spanish actress
- Araceli Ardón, Mexican writer
- Aracely Arámbula, Mexican actress, model and singer

== Scientists and engineers ==
Araceli Sánchez Urquijo (1920–2010), Niños de Rusia child evacuee during Spanish Civil War, first woman to work as a civil engineer in Spain.

=== Variations ===
- Ara Celi, an American actress

== Other ==
- Araceli, Palawan, a Philippine municipality

== See also ==
- Santa Maria in Araceli (Vicenza)
