= Duck Season =

Duck Season may refer to:

- Duck Season (song), a 2002 song by DJ Babu
- Temporada de patos, known in English as Duck Season, a 2004 Mexican film
- Duck Season, a 2017 virtual reality game by Stress Level Zero

== See also ==
- Waterfowl hunting
