= All the Fires =

2023 Mexican romantic drama film

- Theatrical film poster
- Spanish: Todos los incendios
- Directed by: Mauricio Calderón Rico
- Written by: Mauricio Calderón Rico
- Produced by: Mauricio Calderón Rico; Daniel Loustaunau; Francisco Sánchez Solis; Araceli Velázquez
- Starring: Sebastián Rojan; Ximena Ayala; Ari Lopez; Natalia Quiroz; Hector Illanes; Antonio Fortier
- Cinematography: Miguel Escudero
- Edited by: Marlén Ríos-Farjet
- Music by: Patricio Mijares
- Release dates: August 6, 2023 (Locarno); June 20, 2024 (Mexico)
- Running time: 96 mins.
- Country: Mexico
- Language: Spanish

All the Fires (Spanish: Todos los incendios) is a 2023 Mexican romantic drama film, written and directed by Mauricio Calderón Rico. The film stars Sebástian Rojano, Ximena Ayala, Ari Lopez, Natalia Quiroz, Hector Illanes, and Antonio Fortier. It premiered at the Locarno Film Festival in 2023, before a theatrical release throughout Mexico in 2024.

== Synopsis ==
Bruno, a struggling teenage pyromaniac flees the city and embarks on a journey in quest of a girl he met online who would force him to confront the death of his father and his sexuality-related uncertainties.

== Cast ==
- Sebástian Rojano as Bruno
- Ximena Ayala as Ines
- Ari Lopez as Ian
- Natalía Quiroz as Daniela
- Hector Illanes as Gerardo
- Antonio Fortier as Rafael
- Iliana Donatlán as Amelia
- Francisco Borrajo as Vecino
- Hannah Romen as Sarah
- Leonardo Fabrizio as Chava

== Reception ==
Jennie Kermode of Eye for Film rated it 4.5/5 stars, and raved about the performances: "Sebástian Rojano's perfectly nuanced, natural performance conveys a character who is as yet untamed but, perhaps, wants to be, or is at any rate trying to find a way into a calmer and more structured existence." Rich Cline of Shadows on the Wall graded it 4/5 stars, while praising the cinematography: "With its shadowy photography and introspective tone, the film feels extremely intimate as it carefully explores Bruno's internalised journey."

Jason Flatt of But Why Tho? scored it 7/10 and commended Mauricio Calderón Rico's screenplay: "But its perspective on the resentment and lionization of parents is thought-provoking and its gentle journey through the benefits of one teen's increasing proximity to queerness is quite enthralling." Erick Estrada of Cinegarage lauded the genre: "Beyond the interesting and beautiful metaphoric play, all the ingredients of a coming-of-age movie are here."
