= Lola Amores =

Cuban theatre and film actress

- Lola Amores at the Málaga Film Festival, 2024
- Born: Lorelis Amores; 1977 (age 48–49); Vueltas, Cuba
- Occupation: Actress
- Years active: 2013–present
- Known for: Santa & Andrés; La mujer salvaje

Lola Amores (born 1977 in Vueltas, Cuba) is a Cuban theatre and film actress. She was a member of the theatre group El Ciervo Encantado for more than a decade and is a co-founder of Teatro La Isla Secreta. Through her theatre work, she has participated in international events in numerous countries, including South Korea, India, Mexico, Colombia, Brazil and Canada.

In film, she is particularly known for her performances in Santa & Andrés (2016) and La mujer salvaje (2023), which premiered at the Toronto International Film Festival. For the latter, she received several awards, including the Silver Biznaga for Best Actress at the 27th Málaga Film Festival, the Best Actress award in the Vanguard and Gender section at the Buenos Aires International Festival of Independent Cinema (BAFICI), and a nomination for the Platino Awards.

== Biography ==
Amores was born in Vueltas, Cuba, in Villa Clara Province, although she spent the first three years of her life in Mexico.

In September 1995, she began studying at the Instituto Superior de Arte (ISA), graduating in 1999. A few months after graduating, she was invited to join the theatre group El Ciervo Encantado. Among the productions in which she performed were Un elefante ocupa mucho espacio, Pájaros de la playa and Visiones de la Cubanosofía. She toured internationally, performing in countries including South Korea, India, Spain, Brazil, Mexico and Canada. These tours marked her first experiences performing for audiences outside Cuba.

The group was associated with the theatrical avant-garde of the period and staged performances in public spaces. It also worked with writers whose works were censored in Cuba, including Reinaldo Arenas, Severo Sarduy and Guillermo Cabrera Infante. During this period, Amores also developed an interest in costume design. She remained with the group for eleven years.

In 2011, the dissolution of El Ciervo Encantado was announced. Shortly afterwards, Amores co-founded La Isla Secreta with Eduardo Martínez Criado, an actor and former member of El Ciervo Encantado. The theatre space was established in a small house in Centro Habana. Martínez explained that its name was chosen as a tribute to the Spanish philosopher María Zambrano.

Amores has described the more than ten years she spent with El Ciervo Encantado, followed by another eight years with La Isla Secreta, as a period of training that became fundamental to her subsequent acting career.

In 2013, she made her film debut in the short film La nube, directed by Marcel Beltrán and starring actors including Broselianda Hernández and Manuel Porto. She subsequently participated in several short films associated with the International Film and Television School of San Antonio de los Baños.

Her first leading role in a feature film came in 2016 with Santa y Andrés, directed by Carlos Lechuga. The film tells the story of a banned writer and the woman assigned to monitor him. An allegory about censorship and extremism, it was banned in Cuba. Her portrayal of Santa earned her Best Actress awards at the Guadalajara International Film Festival and the Miami Film Festival.

In 2018, she appeared in Los amantes, a short film directed by Alán González. She subsequently collaborated again with González and producer Claudia Calviño on La mujer salvaje, released in 2023. The film, González's feature-length directorial debut, became an important milestone in her international acting career. In March 2024, she received the Silver Biznaga for Best Female Performance at the 27th Málaga Film Festival. She also received other recognitions, including a nomination for Best Actress at the Platino Awards. She also won Best Actress in the Vanguard and Gender section at BAFICI.

Her subsequent feature film, Una noche con los Rolling Stones (2024), directed by Patricia Ramos Hernández, earned her Best Actress awards at the 2024 Havana Film Festival New York and the Puerto Rico Film Festival.

She currently resides in Miami, Florida.

== Filmography ==
Year	Title	Role	Notes
2013	La nube		Short film; directed and written by Marcel Beltrán
2016	Santa y Andrés	Santa	
2018	Club de Jazz		Directed by Esteban Insausti
2018	Los amantes		Short film; directed by Alán González
2018	Sangre		Short film
2019	Fin		Short film
2019	Agosto		Directed by Armando Capó
2021	Terranova		Directed by Alejandro Alonso Estrella
2022	Miki Maníaco	Mimí	Directed and written by Carla Forte
2022	La otra isla	Flor	Short film; directed by José Manuel García Casado
2023	Los océanos son los verdaderos continentes	Yamilet	Directed by Tommaso Santambrogio
2023	La mujer salvaje	Yolanda	Directed by Alán González
2024	Una noche con los Rolling Stones	Rita	Directed by Patricia Ramos
2024	Fenómenos naturales	Dr. Adriana	Directed by Marcos Antonio Díaz Sosa

== Awards and recognition ==
- 2017 – Best Actress, Guadalajara International Film Festival.
- 2017 – Best Actress, Miami Film Festival.
- 2017 – Best Actress, Lleida Film Festival, Spain.
- 2017 – Best Actress, Ceará Film Festival, Brazil.
- 2019 – Best Female Performance, Young Filmmakers Showcase (Muestra de Jóvenes Realizadores), Cuba.
- 2022 – Best Actress, Hollywood Florida Film Festival, United States.
- 2022 – Recognition at the Caracas Film Critics Festival.
- 2023 – Best Supporting Actress, Berlin Festival Competition FilmHaus.
- 2023 – Best Leading Performance, Ceará Film Festival, Brazil.
- 2023 – Best Actress, Culver City Film Festival, Los Angeles, for Miki Maníaco.
- 2024 – Best Actress, Vanguard and Gender section, BAFICI.
- 2024 – Silver Biznaga for Best Female Performance, 27th Málaga Film Festival, for La mujer salvaje.
- 2024 – Nomination for the Platino Awards for La mujer salvaje.
- 2024 – Best Actress, Havana Film Festival in New York, for Una noche con los Rolling Stones.
- 2024 – Best Artistic Contribution – Best Performance for La mujer salvaje, Bannabáfest, Panama.
- 2024 – Career tribute at the 13th Festival of Film and Memory (FIMEC-N), Morocco.
- 2024 – Best Actress, International Festival of Film and Shared Memory (FIMEC-N), Morocco.
