= Ernesto Contreras (director) =

Mexican film director and screenwriter

- Born: 1969 (age 56–57); Veracruz, Veracruz, Mexico
- Occupations: Film director, screenwriter

Ernesto Contreras (born 1969 in Veracruz, Veracruz) is a Mexican film director and screenwriter.

Contreras graduated from the Centro Universitario de Estudios Cinematográficos of the UNAM. His shorts have received several national and international awards, like the Ariel Award of the Mexican Academy for Best Short Film in 2004, for The non-invited.

In 2007, Párpados azules (Blue Eyelids), his first feature-film received the Best Iberoamerican Film and Script awards, as well as the Mezcal Award of the Young Jury in the XXII Guadalajara International Film Festival. He was later nominated for the Camera d’Or of the 60th Cannes Film Festival competing in the official selection of the 46th International Critics' Week. In September of that same year, he received a Special Mention in the San Sebastián International Film Festival, and he also received the National University Distinction Award in Artistic Creation. In 2008, the Sundance Film Festival and the Miami International Film Festival gave him both a Special Jury Prize, and he received the Ariel Award of the Mexican Academy for Best First Work.

In January 2017, Contreras accepted the World Cinema Audience Award: Dramatic at the Sundance Film Festival for his film Sueño en otro idioma. On November 1, 2017, Contreras began a two-year term as the president of the Mexican Academy of Film Arts and Sciences (Academia Mexicana de Artes y Ciencias Cinematográficas ), also known as AMACC. His term will end in October 2019.

Paralleling, he produced and coedited the feature documentary The Last Heroes of the Peninsula, by director José Manuel Cravioto, with whom he is currently codirecting a documentary on the Mexican rock band Café Tacvba’s 20th Anniversary.

== Filmography ==
- Blue Eyelids (2007)
- Seguir siendo: Café Tacvba (2010)
- The Obscure Spring (2014)
- I Dream in Another Language (2017)
- Impossible Things (2021)
- Where the Tracks End (2023)
- El Secreto del Río (2024)

=== Short films ===
- Sueño polaroid (1997)
- Sombras que pasan (1998)
- Ondas hertzianas (2000)
- Gente pequeña (2000)
- El milagro (2000)
- Los no invitados (2003)

== Awards ==
=== IV Concurso Nacional De Cortometraje - 1998 ===
- The IV National Contest for Short Films
  - El milagro

=== Guadalajara Film Festival - 1999 ===
- Mayahuel for Best Short Film
  - For Ondas hertzianas

=== Guadalajara Film Festival - 2000 ===
- Mayahuel for Best Short Film
  - For El Milagro

=== Guadalajara International Film Festival - 2007 ===
- Best Iberoamerican Film
- Best Iberoamerican Script
- Best Mexican Film, by the Young Jury
- Best Director, Script, Actor, Actress, and Film, by Press
  - For Párpados azules

=== Alba International Film Festival - 2008 ===
- Premio Subti and Premio Signis - Gazzetta d’Alba

=== Ariel Award - 2008 ===
==== Silver Ariel ====
- Best First Work (Mejor Opera Prima)
  - For Párpados azules

=== Miami International Film Festival - 2008 ===
==== Special Jury Award ====
  - For Párpados azules

=== Sundance Film Festival - 2008 ===
==== Special Jury Prize ====
  - For Párpados azules

=== Sundance Film Festival - 2017 ===
==== World Cinema Audience Award: Dramatic ====
  - For Sueño en otro idioma

== Nominations ==
=== Cannes Film Festival - 2007 ===
- Camera d'Or 60th
  - For Párpados azules

=== Tokyo International Film Festival - 2007 ===
==== Grand Prize ====
- For Párpados azules
