= Violet Perfume: No One Is Listening =

2001 film

- Directed by: Marisa Sistach
- Starring: Ximena Ayala; Nancy Gutiérrez
- Release date: 11 March 2001
- Running time: 1h 30min
- Country: Mexico
- Language: Spanish

Violet Perfume: No One Is Listening (Spanish: Perfume de violetas, nadie te oye) is a 2001 Mexican drama film directed by Marisa Sistach. It was Mexico's submission to the 74th Academy Awards for the Academy Award for Best Foreign Language Film, but was not accepted as a nominee.

== Plot ==
Yessica (Ximena Ayala) is a rebellious girl who forms an unlikely friendship with quiet schoolmate Miriam (Nancy Gutiérrez). Yessica's home life is ruled by her brutal stepfather and her amoral stepbrother, Jorge (Luis Fernando Peña), while Miriam shares a calm, loving household with her mother. The girls' friendship is shattered after Jorge arranges to have some of his friends, to rape Yessica. In the aftermath, the traumatized girl unwittingly draws Miriam into her troubled world.

== Cast ==
- Ximena Ayala - Yessica
- Nancy Gutiérrez - Miriam
- Arcelia Ramírez - Alicia, madre de Miriam
- María Rojo - Madre de Yessica
- Luis Fernando Peña - Jorge
- Gabino Rodríguez - Héctor
- Pablo Delgado - Juan

== Reception ==
=== Critical response ===
Violet Perfume: Nobody Hears You has an approval rating of 100% on review aggregator website Rotten Tomatoes, based on 5 reviews, and an average rating of 6.5/10. Metacritic assigned the film a weighted average score of 74 out of 100, based on 4 critics, indicating "generally favorable reviews".

=== Awards ===
Violet Perfume: No One Is Listening won five Ariel awards:

- Best Actress: Ximena Ayala
- Best Supporting Actress: Arcelia Ramírez
- Best original script: José Buil
- Best Art Direction
- Best Costume Design

== See also ==
- List of submissions to the 74th Academy Awards for Best Foreign Language Film
- List of Mexican submissions for the Academy Award for Best Foreign Language Film
