= The Desert Within =

- Theatrical release poster
- Directed by: Rodrigo Plá
- Written by: Rodrigo Plá; Laura Santullo
- Produced by: German Mendez; Rodrigo Plá
- Starring: Mario Zaragoza; Dolores Heredia; Diego Catano; Memo Dorantes; Eileen Yanez; Luis Fernando Pena; Jimena Ayala; Katia Xanat Espino
- Edited by: Ana Garcia, Rodrigo Plá
- Music by: Jacobo Lieberman, Leonardo
- Production companies: Mexican Film Institute (IMCINE), Beret Films
- Distributed by: FilmSharks International
- Release date: 2008
- Running time: 112 minutes
- Country: Mexico
- Language: Spanish

The Desert Within (Spanish: Desierto Adentro) is a 2008 Mexican drama film written and directed by Rodrigo Plá. The film was inspired by the diaries of the Christian existentialist philosopher Søren Kierkegaard. It won seven awards at the 2008 Guadalajara International Film Festival. The film incorporates animation and art as bookends to each series of events in the film.

The title of the film is drawn from Nietzsche's epigraph about acknowledging uncertainty: "The desert grows, and woe to him who conceals the desert within him..."

== Plot ==
The film is set against the backdrop of Mexico's Cristero War, which took place between 1926 and 1929, when the Mexican government banned Catholicism and persecuted its followers. Clergy are separated from their congregations and worship is forbidden.

Elias, the central character of the film, follows his wife's wishes by seeking out a priest to perform the last rites on their unborn son, whom she fears will die due to a fall she sustained. Upon finding one, he manages to persuade the priest to return with him to the village to perform the last rites, despite putting the safety of the community at risk. The Federales follow the pair and kill every man, woman and child in the village. Elias's family are able to escape, although his wife dies while giving birth to their son.

Captured, Elias realises he is responsible for the deaths of his entire community and begs the priest for forgiveness before his execution. The priest says he is unable to do so and curses Elias's bloodline. Elias escapes and becomes obsessed with the concept of atoning for his sin. He moves his remaining seven children to the desert where they begin to build a monument to God. As his children begin to die through illness and accident, Elias maintains that God has forsaken him and his religious beliefs turn from reverence to homicidal and take over his and his children's lives.

== Themes ==
Rodrigo Plá wrote the screenplay with his wife, commenting on the story and themes as follows:

The primary idea is generated from the reading of the philosopher Søren Kierkegaard, particularly where it accounts for daily life. Kierkegaard's father lived with the conviction that God would punish him by taking away their children prematurely for a sin he had committed.

The existence of Kierkegaard was marked by the guilt and the image of a vengeful and wrathful God. This essence is preserved in the film, but we decided to change the original context, Protestant and Danish, to Mexican and Catholic. The completion of the script was a very long process, where it was severely restructured, one to contextualize the story in Mexico, and another to define the structure into chapters. The Cristiada topic is very interesting and seductive, but that was not our subject, our story was of that family, that guilt, that punishment, that madness.

The Cristero War within the film works more as a backdrop to the theme itself. We knew what we wanted to tell and the characteristics that we overlaid the religious conflict with were ripe to justify certain events which were the substance of our story: the lack of priests in the country and therefore a clear spiritual guide, the prohibition of public worship and the closure of churches, religious exacerbation, all this gave credibility to certain aspects needed in our history. Religion, or more specifically religious fanaticism, it is one of the themes of the film. Atheists or believers, all in some point in life we stand before God, the existence of God. Moreover, religion is a cultural determinant which also flows through us, like it or not, we live in a Judeo-Christian society and our morals are largely structured by it. The notions of our sin and guilt touch everyone in varying degrees. Religion is a controversial and difficult subject, precisely because it is deeply human, and that is why it seemed interesting to raise questions about that.

For us the Desert Within is a film about men, not God, and it is men who largely built his fortune or misfortune, as in this case. If God punishes or forgives is no longer relevant, it is Elias, the central character, who can not forgive himself, and that guilt is sick, that determination to devote their and their children to an authoritarian and oppressive life to seek redemption, which is destroying the family. There may be other interpretations, hopefully they exist, if there are different readings then the movie provides good entertainment.

We like to think that the Desert Within speaks not only of religious fanaticism, but could be a mirror of other types of fanaticism, the capacity for destruction that lurks behind any idea or thought that stands in a totalitarian manner, which respects not the possibility of dissent and ultimately imposes itself with force, whether physical or psychological. Even if that idea is put forward as something allegedly good for everyone. That is what ultimately happens to Elias, he is unable to question the truth, his truth, it is final and that is how, on behalf of the entire family, he chooses a lifestyle, a form of death and a way to God without taking into account the desire of the children. If this is so, if in some way it can be seen as a metaphor, then we believe that even being a period film, the Desert Within can have an echo in contemporary issues.

== Awards ==
Amiens International Film Festival

- Special Jury Award

Guadalajara International Film Festival

- Audience Award
- MEZCAL Award
- Best Film
- Best Screenplay
- Best Cinematography
- Best Actor (Mario Zaragoza)
- Best Actress (Dolores Heredia)

Haifa International Film Festival

- FIPRESCI Prize

Havana Film Festival

- Best Cinematography

Lleida Latin-American Film Festival

- Best Film
