= Bad Habits (2007 film) =

- Directed by: Simón Bross
- Written by: Ernesto Anaya; Simón Bross
- Starring: Ximena Ayala; Elena de Haro
- Release date: 24 March 2007 (GIFF)
- Running time: 1h 43min
- Country: Mexico
- Language: Spanish

Bad Habits (Spanish: Malos hábitos) is a 2007 Mexican drama film directed by Simón Bross.

== Plot ==
Matilde (Ximena Ayala) is a young woman who abandons her medical studies to become a nun, convinced that a second great flood is imminent. Believing her self-imposed fasting can prevent this catastrophe, she begins to starve herself in secret. While preparing her cousin Linda (Elisa Vicedo) for her First Communion, Matilde's extreme measures lead to severe health consequences.

Elena (Elena de Haro), Matilde's sister-in-law, is obsessed with appearances and deeply ashamed of her daughter Linda's weight. She imposes strict diets and exercise regimens on Linda, aiming to transform her into a "princess" in time for her First Communion. This relentless pressure causes Linda to secretly indulge in food, hiding snacks in her room and eating in solitude.

Gustavo (Marco Antonio Treviño), Elena's husband and Matilde's brother, feels increasingly alienated by Elena's preoccupation with physical appearance and her neglect of their relationship. Seeking comfort and intimacy, he becomes involved with a student known as "Gordibuena" (Milagros Vidal), a voluptuous young woman who embraces her love for food and exudes confidence. This affair offers Gustavo an escape from his domestic dissatisfaction but further complicates the family's dynamics.

As the story unfolds, each character's struggles with body image, faith, and personal fulfillment lead to profound consequences. Matilde's health deteriorates due to her extreme fasting, raising alarms within the convent. Elena's obsession with her daughter's weight results in emotional distress for Linda, highlighting the damaging effects of unrealistic beauty standards. Gustavo's infidelity not only jeopardizes his marriage but also forces him to confront his own desires and the emptiness he feels at home.

== Cast ==
- Ximena Ayala - Matilde
- Elena de Haro - Elena
- Marco Treviño - Gustavo
- Aurora Cano - Teresa
- Elisa Vicedo - Linda
- Emilio Echevarría - Ramón - padre de Matilde
- Patricia Reyes Spíndola - Madre Superiora
- Milagros Vidal - Gordibuena
- Héctor Téllez - Sacerdote
- Alejandro Calva - Doctor Sensato
- Leticia Gómez - Monja
