= Fernando Eimbcke =

Mexican film director and screenwriter (born 1970)

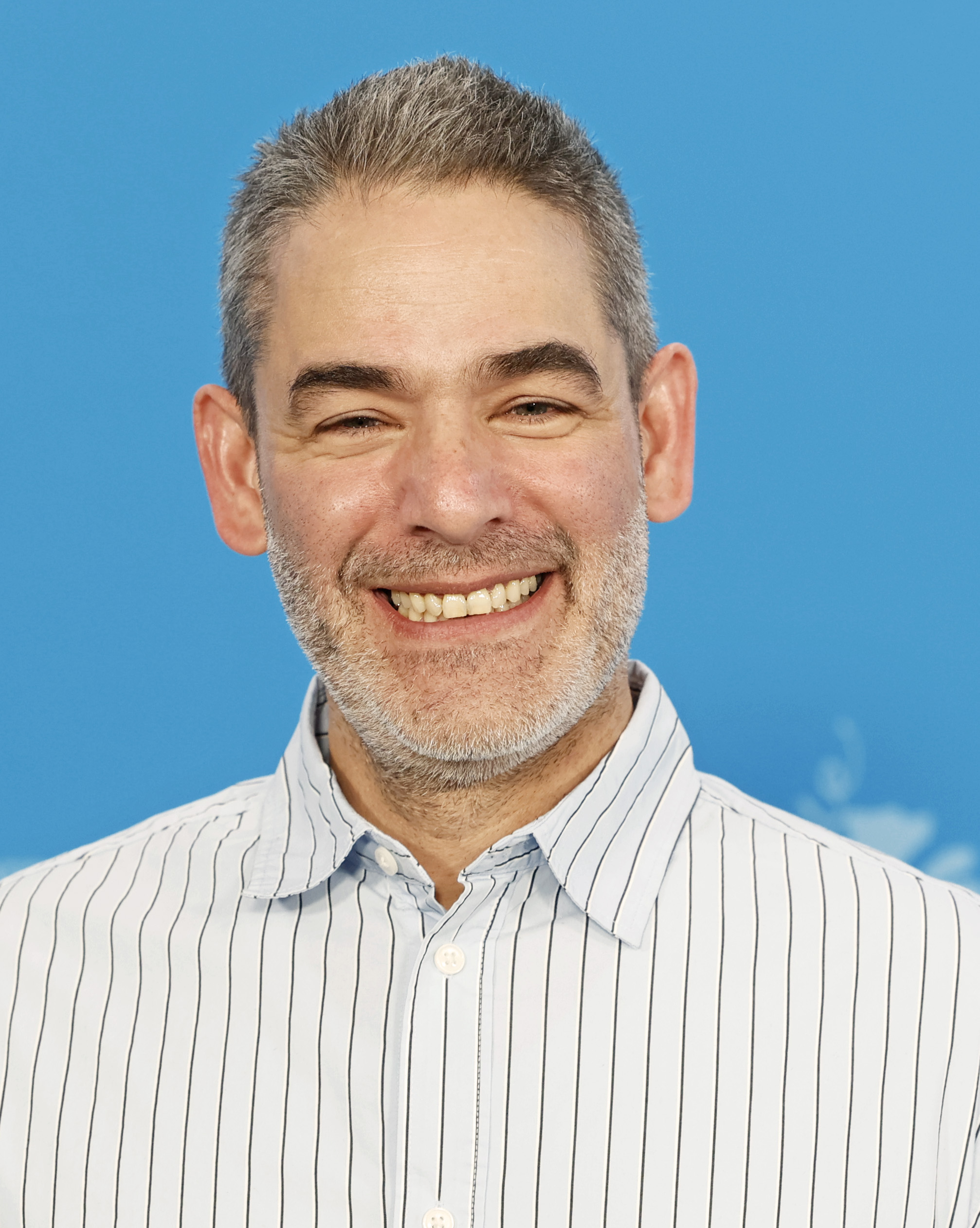
- Eimbcke in 2026
- Born: 1970 (age 55–56); Monterrey, Nuevo León, Mexico
- Occupations: Film director, screenwriter

Fernando Eimbcke (born 1970) is a Mexican film director and screenwriter.

== Early life ==
Fernando Eimbcke studied film direction at the Centro Universitario de Estudios Cinematográficos of the UNAM (1992–1996). He started his career directing music videoclips and short films.

== Career ==
His feature debut in Mexican cinema was the 2004 Temporada de patos (Duck Season), which won several Film Festival awards including the Ariel Award for Best Film. His next film, the 2008 Lake Tahoe, was received positively at the Berlin International Film Festival, winning two awards.

== Filmography ==
- Temporada de patos (2004)
- Lake Tahoe (2008)
- Club Sandwich (2013)
- Berlin, I Love You (2018)
- Olmo (2025)
- Flies (2026)

=== Short films ===
- Perro que ladra (2005)
- The Look of Love (2003)
- No sea malito (2003)
- La suerte de la fea... a la bonita no le importa (2002)
- No todo es permanente (1996)
- Disculpe las molestias (1994)
- Alcanzar una estrella (1993)

== Awards ==
=== Primer Concurso Nacional De Proyectos De Cortometraje ===
- The First National Contest of Short Film Project
  - La suerte de la fea… a la bonita no le importa

=== MTV Movie Awards Mexico ===
==== Nominations ====
2001

- Favorite Video ("Video de la gente", or The people's video) for his video for Genitallica
- Favorite Video for his videos for Jumbo
- Favorite Video for his video for Plastilina Mosh (1998)

=== AFI Fest - 2004 ===
- Won Grand Jury Prize
  - For Temporada de patos

=== Ariel Award - 2005 ===
==== Silver Ariel ====
- Best Director (Mejor Dirección)
  - For Temporada de patos
- Best First Work - Fiction (Mejor Ópera Prima Ficcón)
  - For Temporada de patos
- Best Screenplay Written Directly for the Screen (Mejor Guión Cinematográfico Original)
  - For Temporada de patos

==== Nominations ====
- Best short film
  - For No todo es permanente

=== Guadalajara Film Festival ===
==== FIPRESCI Prize ====
- For Temporada de patos

==== Mayahuel Award ====
- Best Director
  - For Temporada de patos
- Best Screenplay
  - For Temporada de patos

=== Paris Film Festival 2005 ===
- Special Jury Prize
  - For Temporada de patos

==== Nominated ====
- Grand Prix
  - For Temporada de patos

=== Thessaloniki Film Festival 2004 ===
- Best Director
  - For Temporada de patos

==== Nominated ====
- Golden Alexander
  - For Temporada de patos

=== Valladolid International Film Festival 2004 ===
- Nominated Golden Spike
  - For Temporada de patos

=== Berlin International Film Festival 2008 ===
==== Nominated ====
- Golden Berlin Bear
  - For Lake Tahoe

==== Won ====
- Alfred Bauer Prize
  - For Lake Tahoe
- FIPRESCI Prize
  - For Lake Tahoe

=== San Sebastián International Film Festival 2013 ===
==== Nominated ====
- Golden Shell
  - For Club Sándwich

==== Won ====
- Silver Shell for Best Director
  - For Club Sándwich
