= Impossible Things (film) =

- Theatrical release poster
- Directed by: Ernesto Contreras
- Written by: Fanie Soto
- Produced by: Luis Albores; Erika Avila; Ariel Gordon; Mónica Lozano; Mónica Marín; Eamon O'Farrill; Mario Zamacona
- Starring: Nora Velázquez; Benny Emmanuel
- Cinematography: César Gutiérrez Miranda
- Edited by: Jorge Macaya
- Music by: Demián Gálvez; Gustavo Reyes; Andrés Sánchez
- Production companies: Agencia SHA; Alebrije Cine y Video
- Release date: June 17, 2021 (Mexico)
- Running time: 89 minutes
- Country: Mexico
- Language: Spanish
- Box office: $197,251

Impossible Things (Spanish: Cosas imposibles) is a 2021 Mexican drama film directed by Ernesto Contreras and written by Fanie Soto. Starring Nora Velázquez and Benny Emmanuel. It premiered on June 17, 2021, in Mexican theaters.

== Synopsis ==
Matilde is an older woman who suffers domestic abuse by her husband when he was alive, finds a friend in Miguel, a 19-year-old boy who is abandoned by his mother.

== Cast ==
The actors participating in this film are:

- Nora Velázquez as Matilde
  - Adriana Llabres as Young Matilde
- Benny Emmanuel as Miguel
- Salvador Garcini as Porfirio
  - Lucas Mollard as Young Porfirio / Faceless Porfirio
- Luisa Huertas as Eugenia
- Andrés Delgado as Lalo
- Gabriela Cartol as Laura
- Juan Carlos Medellin as Manuel Chang
- Ari Gallegos as Male Singer
- Pablo Marín as Policeman
- Héctor Holten as Néstor
- Norma Pablo as Elena
- Michelle Betancourt as Daniela
- Ángel Flores Torres as Chava
- Haydee Leyva as Galaxia
- Adrián Vázquez as Plumber
- Tete Espinoza as Rosita
- Bruno Coronel as Narro
- Veronica Toussaint as Female Singer
- Nora Isabel Huerta as Demonstrator
- Armando Casas as Security Guard
- Claudia Acosta as Employee
- Christian Cortés as Ernesto
- Paulina Álvarez Muñoz as La Güera
- Danae Reynaud as Girl who buys drugs

== Reception ==
=== Critical reception ===
Alejandro Alemán from Semanario Eje Central wrote: "Although the most cynical will find friendship between a septuagenarian and a teenager impossible, (...), it is also impossible not to recognize the good manufacturing of this film that aims to make us smile. It succeeds, and by far." Jesús Chavarría from La Razón de México wrote: "The director does not bet on sensationalism or technical fanfare, nor are there false pretensions or condescension, only the trade and honesty at the service of a story that leads the nature of empathy to take shape in the cinema."

=== Accolades ===
Year	Award	Category	Recipient	Result	Ref.
2022	Ariel Award	Best Picture	Ernesto Contreras	Nominated	
2022	Ariel Award	Best Director	Ernesto Contreras	Nominated	
2022	Ariel Award	Best Actor	Benny Emmanuel	Nominated	
2022	Ariel Award	Best Actress	Nora Velázquez	Nominated	
2022	Ariel Award	Best Supporting Actor	Andrés Delgado	Nominated	
2022	Ariel Award	Best Supporting Actor	Salvador Garcini	Nominated	
2022	Ariel Award	Best Cinematography	César Gutiérrez Miranda AMC	Nominated	
2022	Ariel Award	Best Original Score	Gus Reyes & Andrés Sánchez	Won	
2022	Ariel Award	Best Art Direction	Diana Saade	Nominated	
2022	Ariel Award	Best Sound	Misael Hernández, Enrique Greiner, Raymundo Ballesteros & Manuel Montaño	Nominated	
