= The Other Tom =

2021 film

- Theatrical release poster
- Directed by: Rodrigo Plá; Laura Santullo
- Written by: Rodrigo Plá; Laura Santullo
- Produced by: Alejandro de Icaza; Gabriela Maldonado; Rodrigo Plá; Laura Santullo; Sandino Saravia Vinay
- Cinematography: Odei Zabaleta
- Edited by: Miguel Schverdfinger
- Production companies: BHD Films, Buenaventura
- Release date: 2021
- Country: Mexico
- Language: English

The Other Tom (Spanish: El otro Tom) is a 2021 English-language Mexican drama film written, co-produced and directed by Rodrigo Plá and Laura Santullo.

The film premiered at the 78th edition of the Venice Film Festival, in the Horizons competition.

The film was also screened at the 46th Toronto International Film Festival and at the 2021 Warsaw Film Festival, where Plá and Santullo won the award for best director.

== Plot ==
A mother may lose custody of her son because she refuses to medicate his ADHD.

== Cast ==
- Ioana Bugarin as Cristina Tofan
- Emanuel Parvu as Marius Preda
- Cezar Antal as Batin

== Reception ==
On the review aggregator website Rotten Tomatoes, 90% of 29 critics' reviews are positive, with an average rating of 6.40/10.
