= Santa & Andres =

2016 film

- Film poster
- Directed by: Carlos Lechuga
- Written by: Carlos Lechuga
- Produced by: Claudia Calviño; Carlos Lechuga
- Starring: Lola Amores; Eduardo Martínez
- Cinematography: Javier Labrador
- Edited by: Joanna Montero
- Music by: Santiago Barbosa Cañón
- Release date: 11 September 2016 (TIFF)
- Running time: 105 minutes
- Countries: Cuba; France; Colombia
- Language: Spanish

Santa & Andres (Spanish: Santa y Andrés) is a 2016 internationally co-produced drama film written and directed by Carlos Lechuga.

The film had its world premiere in the Contemporary World Cinema section at the 2016 Toronto International Film Festival. It was shown at the San Sebastián, Zurich, Chicago, Göteborg, Miami, Cartagena, and Guadalajara film festival where it won best actor, among others. It was also initially selected to be screened at the 2016 Havana Film Festival, which, in 2014, had bestowed its "Unproduced Script Award" to the film's script, but was subsequently excluded at the instigation of the state-run Instituto Cubano del Arte e Industria Cinematográficos. After having initially been invited to screen in competition at the Havana Film Festival New York in April 2017, the film was relegated to a special screening – according to Variety due to pressure from the ICAIC – and then, out of protest, pulled altogether by Lechuga.

== Plot ==
In 1983 Cuba, Andrés, a dissident gay novelist is placed under house arrest for his sexual and ideological orientation. Santa, a local peasant woman working on a state farm is assigned to keep a close watch on him for three consecutive days, keeping him from disrupting a political event and gaining the attention of foreign journalists. An unlikely friendship forms between the two as they both realize that they have a lot in common.

== Cast ==
- Jorge Abreu
- Lola Amores
- Eduardo Martinez
