= Simón Bross =

Mexican director and producer

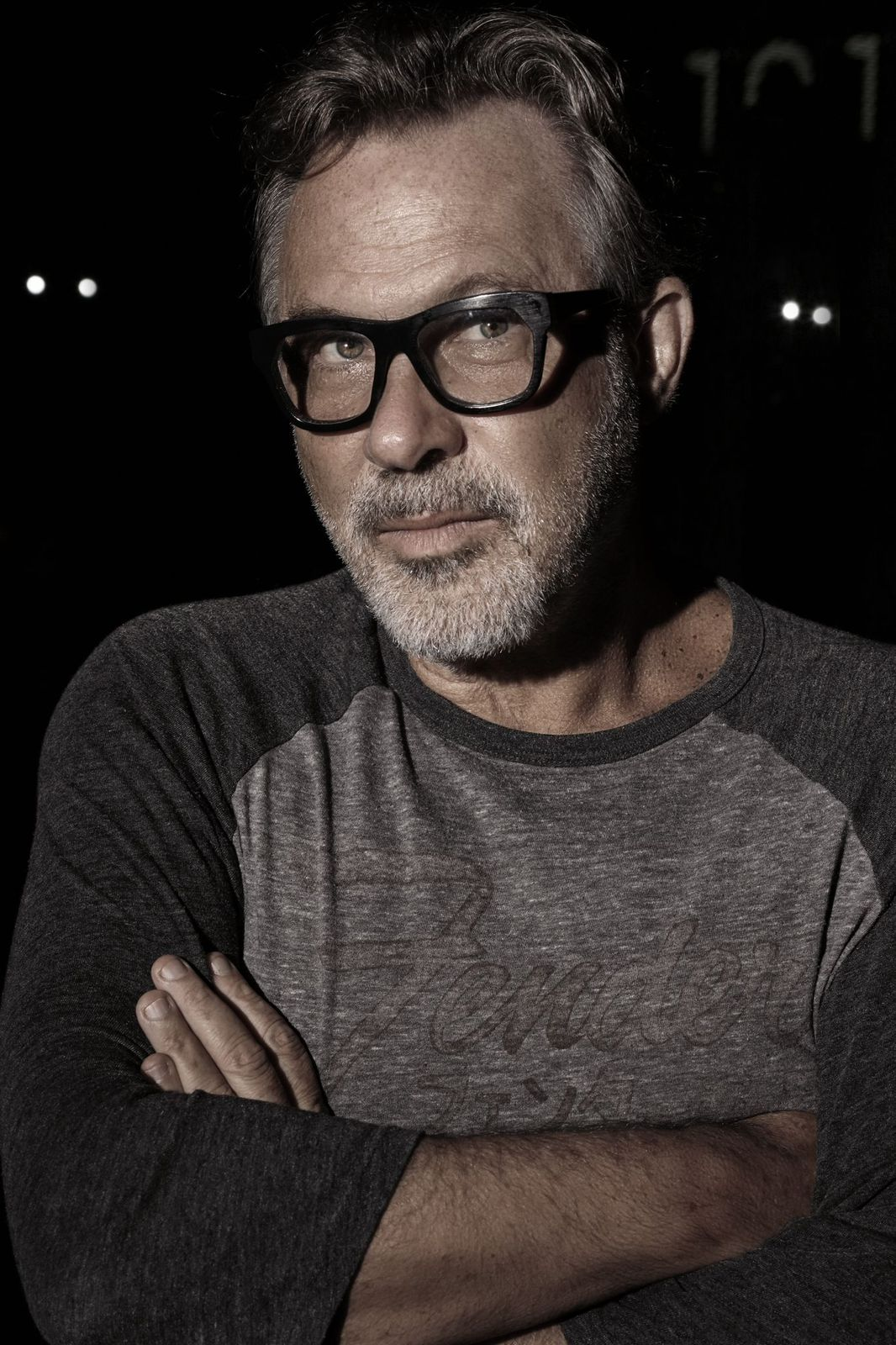
- Born: February 22, 1960 (age 66); Mexico
- Occupations: Director & Producer for Film, TV and Theater

Simón Bross (born February 22, 1960) is a Mexican director and producer.

As a director in advertising he has won at the world's most important festivals: London International Advertising Awards, New York Festival, FIAP (Spanish: Festival Iberoamericano de Publicidad), Círculo de Oro, Clio Awards, and Cannes Lions.

He is the first (and only) Mexican director to be named member of FIAP's "Hall of fame". Círculo Creativo de México gave him a special tribute for his career in the advertising industry. The Gunn Report (England) ranked him among the world's best advertising film directors. He also won the award Volcán de Oro in the Festival Pantalla de Cristal for his brilliant career achievements (including other mentions).

He also directs and produces for television. He participated as executive producer in "Diario de un cocinero", which won an award for best TV program by the Travel + Leisure magazine. In feature film area he has produced such movies as Who the Hell is Juliette? (Spanish: ¿Quién diablos es Juliette?, Second Century (Spanish: Segundo Siglo), "Elvira", Carrière 250/Jean Claude Carrière, as well short film. Produces and directs "Bad Habits" and presents in the Cannes Film Festival. After, Morelia Film festival awarded him for his film trajectory. Today he produces and directs fiction films, documentaries, short films, TV series and advertising films.

He produces commercial films such as "We Are The Nobles" and documentary films like Devil's Freedom which in 2017 was the winner for best feature in the Guadalajara International Film Festival and the Documentary Amnesty International prize in the Berlin International Film Festival.

He´s also producer in La 4a Compañía directed by Mitzi Vanessa Arreola and Amir Galván Cervera, which recently won 10 awards Premio Ariel including Best Feature Film, as well as producing the lauded documentary Witkin & Witkin.

== Today ==
He will be the president of the production jury at the FIAP 2020.

In 2020 he was summoned in the Creative Circle to give his talk entitled "I remember."

On October 22, 2019, the vice president of Festival Internacional de Cine de Morelia(FICM), Cuauhtémoc Cárdenas Batel, in the company of director Fabián Ibarra and producer Simón Bross, presented the film El Gallinero in the 17th edition of the festival.

He was honored by the Universidad Iberoamericana.

As a member of the Jury for D&AD Creative Advertising Festival 2018, he was in charge, along with other members of the jury, with awarding the prestigious Black Pencil.

President of the Jury at the Ibero-American Advertising Festival (FIAP) 2017.

President of the jury in the Area of Audiovisual Production Techniques at the FIAP 2015. Invited to the New York Festival 2015 as a Jury in the Grand Jury / Film Craft area.

GARCIABROSS (producer of Simón Bross) together with Gray Mexico and our director Pedro Armendáriz won 4 Cannes lions (2 Oros,1 Plata, 1 Bronce) with the Paper Glasses project at Cannes Lions 2016.

He´s also producer in La 4a Compañía directed by Mitzi Vanessa Arreola and Amir Galván Cervera, which recently won 10 awards Premio Ariel including Best Feature Film.

Together with Inna Payán and Roberto Garza he co-produces the documentary La Libertad del Diablo by Everardo González which has won several awards, among which Amnesty International for Documentaries of the Berlinale of the Berlin International Film Festival and the prize for best documentary at the Guadalajara International Film Festival. He also won the Ariel Award for Best Documentary Feature.

He is also executive producer in the successful Mexican feature film "Nosotros los Nobles"

Producer of the Short Film Matices, directed by Saúl Masri, who won the Best Drama Short Award at the KisaKes Festival in Turkey and 1st place at the Jewish Film Festival.

President of the jury Craft Audiovisual - Craft Audio - Craft Digital at the 32nd Festival of Circulo de Oro

== Opinions ==
"Simón works in favor of the idea and not for the production. His contributions as a director always make creative ideas richer. I don’t know how but if there's an idea that starts in A, he takes it to Z. He's got magic and he perfectly knows how to get the brand the added values it needs and raise its sales to the point it makes fortunes. It's important to highlight that his success is not searching for awards, he doesn’t live for them. He's success is due to the effectiveness of his commercials; they raise sales and make great business for the clients." -José Becker

"Simón Bross is a director who respects the creative idea. He is impeccable in production and brilliant directing actors. He is very clear that production values go in function of the creative idea (script), and he knows how to maximize those values. In addition, he's totally honest when it comes to giving feedback of the creative ideas. He always finds the way to make the idea richer and establish clear production criteria (meaning he finds the right actor, location and other elements that were visualized in the initial idea). He directs commercials in a very special way: he achieves credibility and makes the target identified with them. We work in each commercial just as we would work on a feature film: my creative labor is to make the script and then he takes that idea into the screen taking care of each element on the scene." -Lourdes Lamasney

"Simón has a great passion for advertising and he adds a lot to all the creative ideas he directs. He cares that the consumer gets connected to the ideas. He analyzes how to make commercials that we’ll be remembered and will not get lost." -Tony Hidalgo

"Simón has a great criteria to the select creative ideas he wants to direct. When he detects a good idea he knows how to get close to the creative to make it even better. Working with him is like working with another creative, the only difference is that he directs and he also knows the bases of advertising." –Yuri Alvarado.

"Simon knows exactly what to do and know how to do the main thing, which helps to enrich the scripts achieving their business connect with people in seconds". Tebo Samaniego.

== Mentions, awards and nominations ==
- Premio Ariel (2017)
  - Award: Best Feature Film (La 4a Compañía)
- Berlin International Film Festival (2017)
  - Award: Documentary Amnesty International (Devil's Freedom)
- Guadalajara International Film Festival (2017)
  - Award: Mezcal Best Documentary (Devil's Freedom)
- Guadalajara International Film Festival (2007)
  - Award: Mayahuel Best Mexican Fiction Film (Bad Habits)
- CineVegas International Film Festival (2007)
  - Award: La Próxima Ola Jury Prize Best Feature Film (Bad Habits)
- Montreal World Film Festival (2007)
  - Award: Silver Zenith Best First Fiction Feature Film (Bad Habits)
- Bogota Film Festival (2007)
  - Award: Circulo Precolombino de Oro Best Director, Best Feature Film (Bad Habits)
- AFI Dallas International Film Festival (2007)
  - Narrative category Honorable Mention (Bad Habits)
- Los Angeles Latino International Film Festival (2007)
  - Award: Special Jury Award Best Work (Bad Habits)
- International Film Festival Bratislava (2007)
  - Nominated GRAND PRI (Bad Habits)
- FIAP (2004)
  - Award: Gold Best Production House
- Circulo de Oro(2002)
  - Award: Grand Prix Televisión Dormimundo, Gilbert DDB
- FiPTUR Brasil
  - Award: Grand Prix Duracell, Ogilvy & Mather
- Festival Internacional de Creatividad Cannes Lions(1997)
  - Award: Bronce Duracell, Ogilvy & Mather
- Festival Internacional de Creatividad Cannes Lions
  - Award: Gold Aeromexico
- Circulo Creativo de México(1998)
  - Award: Gold Afore Garante
