= Daniela Cajías =

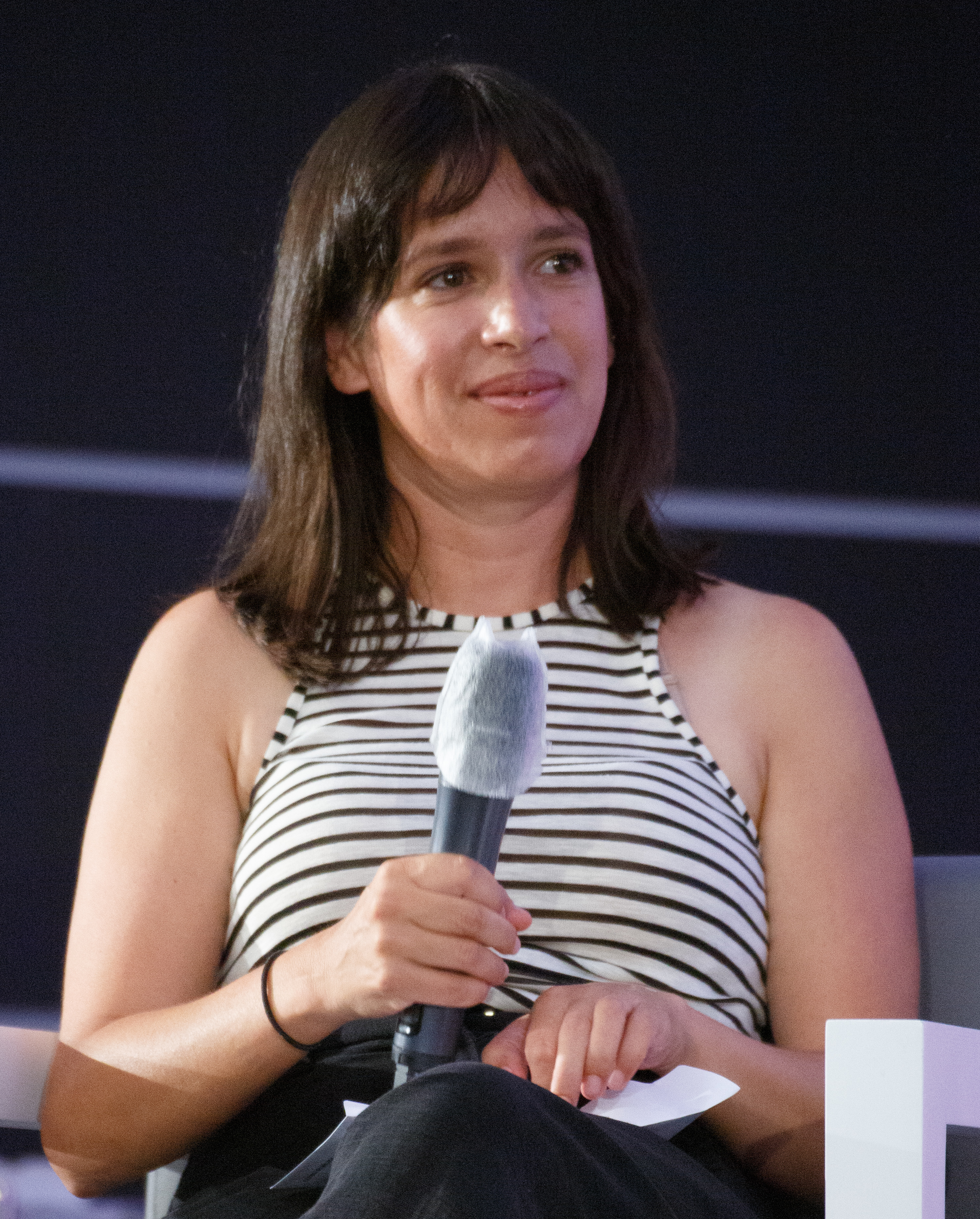
- Born: 1981 (age 43–44); La Paz, Bolivia
- Education: EICTV
- Occupation: Cinematographer

Daniela Cajías (born 1981) is a Bolivian cinematographer.

== Life and career ==
Cajías was born in 1981 in La Paz, to Francisco Cajías and María Eugenia Muñoz, both active in the 1980s Bolivian film industry. She received formal training in photography in Buenos Aires. After graduating in 2008 from the Cuban EICTV, she has worked in Bolivia, Cuba, Colombia, Brazil, Mexico, and Spain. Early works include credits in films such as La eterna noche de las doce lunas (2013), Two Irenes (2017), and Después de ti (2021). Daniela Cajías settled in Spain in 2015. Her work in Schoolgirls (2020) won her a Goya Award for Best Cinematography (becoming the first female cinematographer to earn the award), a Gaudí Award and a Platino Award for Best Cinematography nomination. She then lensed Alcarràs (2022, earning nominations to the Gaudí Awards, the Goya Awards, and the Platino Awards) and the television miniseries The Left-Handed Son (2023).
