= Immersion (film) =

2021 film directed by Nicolás Postiglione

- Theatrical Poster
- Directed by: Nicolás Postiglione
- Written by: Agustin Toscano; Moisés Sepulveda; Nicolás Postiglione
- Produced by: Moisés Sepulveda; Francisco Hervé; Isabel Orellana Guarello; Nicolás San Martín; Alejandro Wise; Juan Bernardo González; Arturo Pereyra
- Starring: Alfredo Castro; Consuelo Carreño; Michael Silva; Mariela Mignot; Alex Quevedo
- Cinematography: Sergio Armstrong
- Edited by: Valeria Hernández; Nicolás Postiglione
- Music by: Paulo Gallo
- Production companies: Araucaria Cine; Juntos; Primate Lab Producciones; Whisky Films
- Release date: 2 October 2021 (Guadalajara International Film Festival)
- Running time: 88 minutes
- Countries: Chile; Mexico
- Language: Spanish

Immersion (Spanish: Inmersión) is a 2021 thriller film directed by Nicolás Postiglione and starring Alfredo Castro. An international co-production between Chile and Mexico, the film is about a family sailing trip that takes an unexpected turn. The film had its world premiere at the 2021 Guadalajara International Film Festival, where it won a number of awards.

== Plot ==
Ricardo, a middle-class father, and his two daughters are sailing on a remote and beautiful lake in Chile to visit the family's vacation home, which has been neglected for years and is falling apart. While his daughters nap on deck in the mid-day sun, Ricardo sees a group of men on a small boat in apparent distress and calling for help. Paralyzed by his paranoia, he turns his sailboat in the other direction, but his daughters wake up and call him out for his lack of compassion. Ashamed by their criticism, Ricardo returns to assist the men, who come aboard his sailboat. Unfortunately, one of the men is missing and feared drowned, and a tense search ensues, causing an ugly fear to fester between all parties. This leads to a chain of events that cannot be reversed.

== Cast ==
- Alfredo Castro as Ricardo
- Consuelo Carreño as Teresita
- Michael Silva as Walter
- Mariela Mignot as Claudia
- Alex Quevedo as Conrrado

== Release ==
Immersion had its world premiere at the 2021 Guadalajara International Film Festival, where it won best first feature, best director, and best cinematography.
