= The Sharks (film) =

- Poster
- Spanish: Los Tiburones
- Directed by: Lucía Garibaldi
- Written by: Lucía Garibaldi
- Produced by: Isabel García; Pancho Magnou Arnábal
- Starring: Romina Bentancur; Federico Morosini; Fabián Arenillas; Valeria Lois; Antonella Aquistapache
- Cinematography: German Nocella
- Edited by: Sebastián Schjaer
- Music by: Fabrizio Rossi; Miguel Recalde
- Production company: Montelona Cine
- Release date: January 2019 (Sundance)
- Running time: 83 minutes
- Countries: Uruguay; Argentina; Spain
- Language: Spanish

The Sharks (Spanish: Los Tiburones) is a 2019 coming-of-age drama film written and directed by Lucia Garibaldi, co-producted by Uruguay, Argentina and Spain.

== Plot ==
Rosina, 14, lives in a small coastal town where sharks are reported to appear. She takes a summer job in home maintenance and finds herself surrounded by ultra-masculine men. While dealing with family problems, she finds herself attracted to a young fisherman several years older than herself-

== Release and reception ==
The film premiered at the 2019 Sundance Film Festival in the World Cinema Dramatic Competition, where it won the World Cinema Dramatic Directing Award. The film also won the Work in Progress Prize at the San Sebastian Film Festival, and the Grand Prix Coup de Cœur at the Toulouse Latin Film Festival.

It became available on Video-on-Demand on April 14, 2020.

The movie has an 82% rating on Rotten Tomatoes.
