= This Is Not a Comedy =

- Film poster
- Spanish: El Comediante
- Directed by: Rodrigo Guardiola; Gabriel Nuncio
- Written by: Gabriel Nuncio; Alo Valenzuela
- Starring: Gabriel Nuncio; Cassandra Ciangherotti; Adriana Paz
- Cinematography: Isaac Vila
- Edited by: Alberto de Toro
- Music by: Diego Navarro
- Production companies: Agencia Bengala; Panorama Global
- Distributed by: Netflix
- Release date: 14 October 2021
- Running time: 105 minutes
- Country: Mexico
- Language: Spanish

This Is Not a Comedy (Spanish: El Comediante) is a 2021 Mexican comedy-drama film directed by Rodrigo Guardiola and Gabriel Nuncio, written by Gabriel Nuncio and Alo Valenzuela and starring Gabriel Nuncio, Cassandra Ciangherotti and Adriana Paz.

== Cast ==
- Gabriel Nuncio
- Cassandra Ciangherotti as Leyre
- Adriana Paz as Melissa
- Cecilia Suárez
- Alejandro Saevich as Saevich
- Eduardo Donjuan as Don Juan (as Eduardo Don Juan)
- Manolo Caro as Lauro
- María Castellá as Magaly
- Carlos Abraham Gongo as Gerardo
- Renata Vaca as Dayana
- Tamara Vallarta as Lily
