= Lake Tahoe (film) =

2008 Mexican film directed by Fernando Eimbcke

- Directed by: Fernando Eimbcke
- Screenplay by: Fernando Eimbcke; Paula Markovitch
- Produced by: Christian Valdelièvre
- Starring: Diego Cataño; Hector Herrera; Daniela Valentine; Juan Carlos Lara II
- Cinematography: Alexis Zabé
- Edited by: Mariana Rodríguez
- Distributed by: Cine Pantera
- Release date: February 9, 2008 (Berlin Film Festival)
- Running time: 85 minutes
- Country: Mexico
- Language: Spanish

Lake Tahoe is a 2008 Mexican drama film, directed by Fernando Eimbcke.

It premiered at the Berlin International Film Festival in Germany on February 9, 2008 and won ten awards, including two Silver Ariels for best supporting actor (Hector Herrera) and best director. The film follows a teenage boy who has crashed the family car and his prolonged attempts to find a new engine part to fix it. His and his family's grief at his father's recent death are also shown. The title is derived from a Lake Tahoe bumper sticker on the car.
