= Araceli Torres Flores =

Mexican politician

- Born: 17 October 1960 (age 65); Teotihuacán, State of Mexico, Mexico
- Occupation: Deputy
- Political party: PT

Araceli Torres Flores (born 17 October 1960) is a Mexican politician affiliated with the Labor Party. As of 2013 she served as Deputy of the LXII Legislature of the Mexican Congress representing Veracruz.
