= Os Famosos e os Duendes da Morte =

2009 film directed by Esmir Filho

- Directed by: Esmir Filho
- Written by: Ismael Caneppele; Esmir Filho
- Based on: Os Famosos e os Duendes da Morte by Ismael Caneppele
- Produced by: Maria Ionescu; Sara Silveira
- Starring: Henrique Larré; Ismael Caneppele; Tuane Eggers
- Cinematography: Mauro Pinheiro Jr.
- Edited by: Caroline Leone
- Distributed by: Warner Bros. Pictures (Brazil); Solaris Distribution (France)
- Release date: 2009 (Locarno)
- Running time: 101 minutes
- Countries: Brazil; France
- Language: Portuguese

Os Famosos e os Duendes da Morte (The Famous and The Dead) is a 2009 Brazilian drama film directed by Esmir Filho. This film won best picture award at Festival do Rio 2009.

== Cast ==
- Henrique Larré
- Ismael Caneppele as Julian
- Tuane Eggers
