= Rodrigo Plá =

Uruguayan screenwriter and director (born 1968)

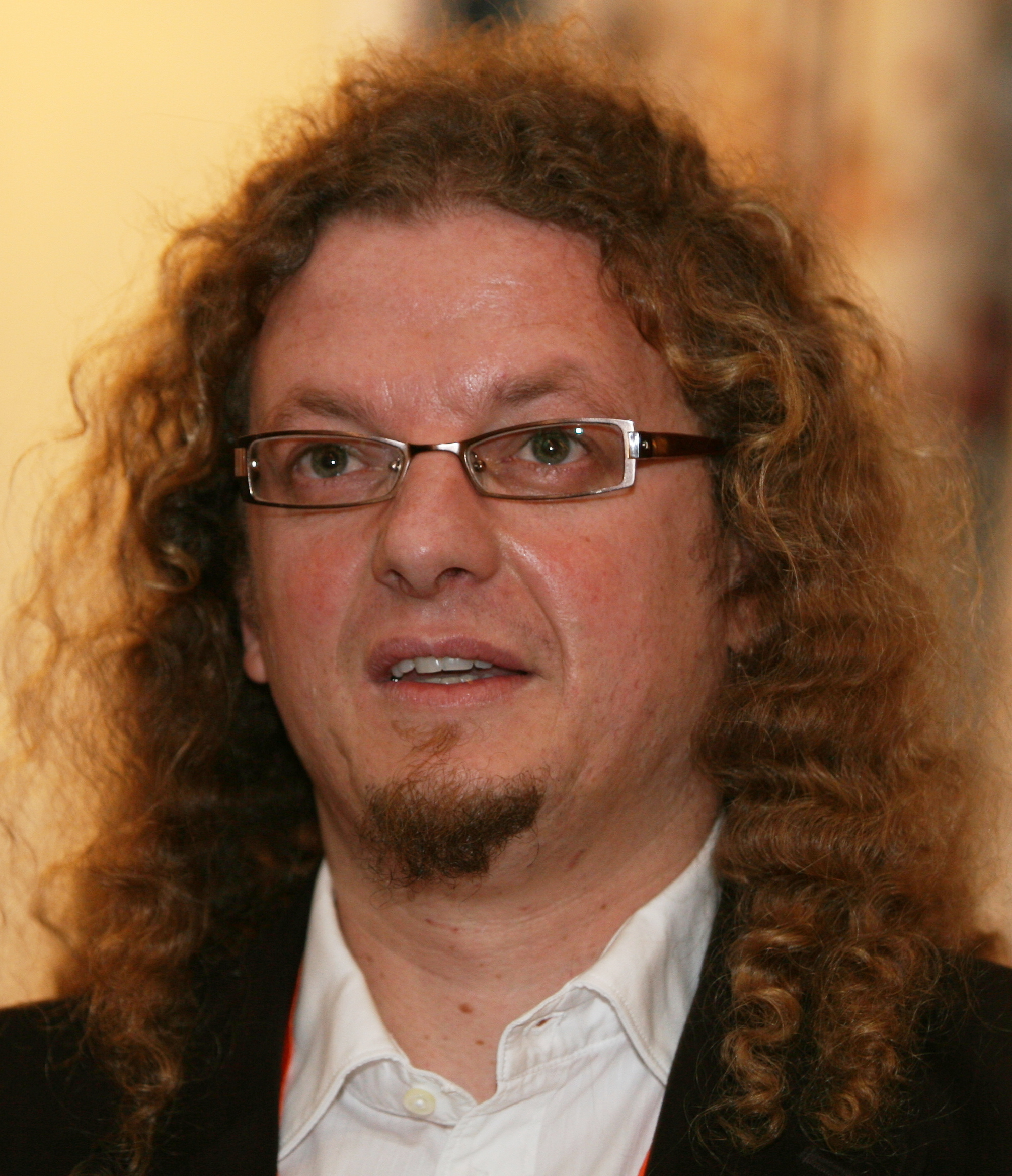
- Plá in 2008
- Born: Rodrigo Plá; 9 June 1968 (age 58); Montevideo, Uruguay
- Years active: 1988–present

Rodrigo Plá (born 9 June 1968) is a Uruguayan screenwriter and director. He is best known for his 2007 film La Zona (The Zone).

Plá studied photography, screenwriting and direction at the Centro de capacitación cinematográfica in Mexico City, where he has lived since he was 9 years old. In 1988 he directed his first short-film.

His 2012 film The Delay was selected as the Uruguayan entry for the Best Foreign Language Oscar at the 85th Academy Awards, but it did not make the final shortlist.

Rodrigo is married to writer Laura Santullo, who has written all the screenplays for all four of his full-length feature films, including his latest, Un Monstruo de Mil Cabezas ("A Monster With a Thousand Heads"), which was based on her novel by the same name.

== Filmography ==
- Novia Mía, 1996
- El ojo en la nuca, 2001
- La Zona, 2007
- Desierto adentro, 2008
- Revolución, 2010
- The Delay, 2012
- Un Monstruo de Mil Cabezas, 2015
- The Other Tom, 2021
