= Blue Eyelids =

2007 film

- Directed by: Ernesto Contreras
- Written by: Carlos Contreras
- Produced by: Ernesto Contreras
- Starring: Cecilia Suárez; Enrique Arreola
- Edited by: Ernesto Contreras; José Manuel Cravioto
- Music by: Iñaki Cano
- Release date: 27 March 2007
- Running time: 1h 38min
- Country: Mexico
- Language: Spanish

Blue Eyelids (Spanish: Párpados azules) is a 2007 Mexican drama film directed by Ernesto Contreras.

== Plot ==
Marina Farfán works at a cloth factory, and during a work ceremony the owner of the company draws Marina's name on a contest, and she wins a paid trip to Playa Salamandra. When she collects her prize, Marina finds out it's a trip for two, but her introverted and sordid personality had stopped her from connecting with other people for years, and she doesn't have anyone to share the trip with.

Later, while Marina buys bread, she is recognized by Víctor, a former high school classmate that she doesn't remember, but who is a little insistent on talking to her to remember the old days. Marina isn't interested in his advances, but when she fights with her sister Lucía, who was supposed to come with her on the trip, she decides to call Víctor and invite him to go with her instead.

Víctor agrees to go with her, but as the departure day gets closer, spontaneously, they alternate invitations to go out that make them gradually get to know each other. Although there's mutual disposition, they never connect with each other emotionally. It comes to the time when they both have to confess that they're alone, and that it's the main reason they got together despite being two strangers.

When the day of the travel arrives, Marina decides to go by herself. When she returns, she talks with Víctor, and they both agree to give each other a second chance. Víctor proposes to her, and she accepts, despite the lack of chemistry and love between the two of them.

== Cast ==
- Cecilia Suárez as Marina Farfán
- Enrique Arreola as Víctor Mina
