= Lucía Garibaldi =

Uruguayan film director (born 1986)

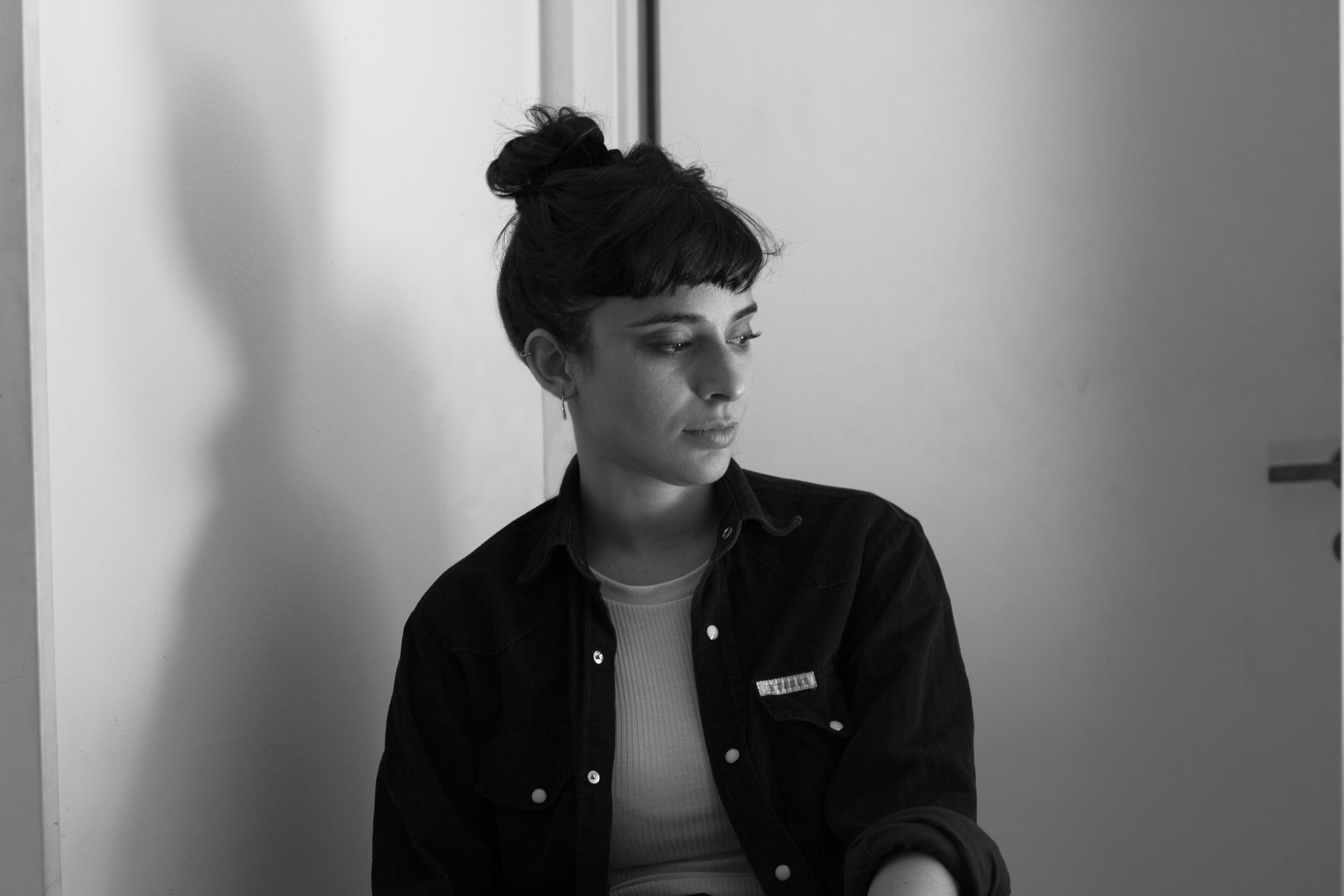
- Born: 1986 (age 38–39); Montevideo, Uruguay
- Occupation(s): Film director, producer

Lucía Garibaldi (born 1986) is a film director from Uruguay.

Lucía Garibaldi studied at the Instituto Escuela Nacional de Bellas Artes in 2006–2010. She emerged as a director with her debut feature The Sharks premiering at the 2019 Sundance Film Festival and winning the World Cinema Dramatic Directing Award. The film also won the Work in Progress Prize at the San Sebastian Film Festival, and the Grand Prix Coup de Cœur at the Toulouse Latin Film Festival.

She participated in Berlinale Talents 2012 Buenos Aires edition.

In 2018, she started writing the script of La Última Reina (The Last Queen). The upcoming film has already won several development grants: the Montevideo Socio Audiovisual film funding scheme in the category Fiction Feature in Development, ICAU's Film Promotion Fund for developing a fiction feature, an invitation at Ibermedia's Course on Film Project Development. The film was selected to participate in the 9th Europe-Latin America Co-production Forum at the 68th San Sebastian Film Festival.

In 2023, her next project A Bright Future won a €35,000 development grant from Berlinale World Cinema Fund. The film had its world premiere at the 2025 Tribeca Film Festival, where it won the Viewpoints award.

== Filmography ==
- 2009 – Colchones
- 2012 – Mojarra
- 2016 – Rotos y Descosidos
- 2019 – The Sharks (Los tiburones).
- In production – The Last Queen (La Última Reina)
- In production – Look at me, Roberto, Look at me (Mírame Roberto, mírame)
- 2025 – A Bright Future
