= Two Irenes =

2017 Brazilian film by Fabio Meira

Two Irenes (Portuguese: As Duas Irenes) is a 2017 Brazilian film, directed by Fabio Meira.

== Plot ==
Irene (Priscilla Bettencourt) is a shy 13-year-old girl. She lives with her parents and siblings, but her father (Marco Ricca) is often away. When he is at home, he sometimes declines to eat with the family, saying that he has already eaten.

Irene becomes aware that her father has another daughter of the same age, who lives with her mother in the same town, and is also called Irene. She contrives a reason to meet the other Irene (Isabella Torres), who is much more extroverted and self-confident, but calls herself Madalena, the name of her family's live-in maid. The two gradually become friends, and Irene starts to spend more time at the second Irene's house.

At home, Irene starts behaving out of character, for example by calling her father by his first name instead of Dad, and telling Madalena that she has kissed a boy, when in fact it was the other Irene who kissed him. She tells her family a story about another girl called Irene, who has some similarities to the first Irene, causing her father a moment of panic. However, part way through, she makes up some clearly fictional elements, so the rest of the family thinks that the entire story is made up.

Eventually, Irene reveals her secret to the second Irene. In the final scene of the movie, the two girls swap places, to the consternation of the respective mothers.

== Reception ==
Two Irenes was recognised at a number of film festivals. It was awarded Best First Feature at the Guadalajara International Film Festival, and won the Aprile prize for best feature film at the Milan Film Festival.
