= Ximena Ayala =

Mexican actress

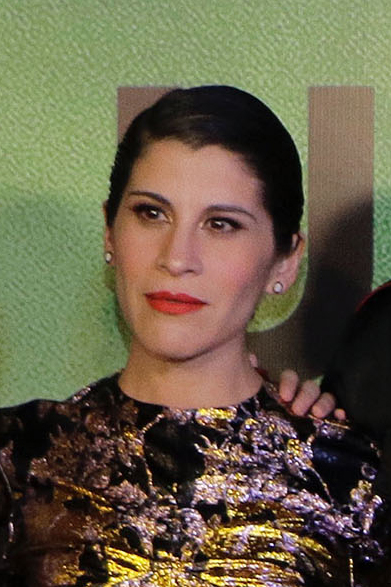
- Ayala in 2018
- Born: 29 December 1980 (age 45); Mexico City, Mexico
- Occupation: Actress
- Years active: 1999-present

Ximena Ayala (born 29 December 1980) is a Mexican actress. She has appeared in more than thirty films since 1999.

== Selected filmography ==
Film
Year	Title	Role	Notes
2001	Violet Perfume: No One Is Listening	Yessica	
2006	La niña en la piedra	Perla	
2007	Bad Habits	Matilde	
2014	The Amazing Catfish	Claudia	

Television
Year	Title	Role	Notes
2010–2012	Capadocia	Janette María Gómez	
2015–2016	Bajo el mismo cielo	Juana García	
2017	Guerra de ídolos	Agustina Osorio	
2018	Luis Miguel: The Series	Adriana	Episode: "Culpable o no"
2018	Guardia-García	Martina Velasco	
2019	Doña Flor y sus dos maridos	Rosalía Méndez Canúl	
2020	La negociadora	Flor	
2023	Todos los incendios	Inés	
