= Marisa Sistach Peret =

Mexican film director (b. 1952)

Marisa Sistach
- Born: September 10, 1952 (age 73)
- Occupation: Director

Marisa Sistach (né Marysa Sistach Peret, born September 10, 1952) is a Mexican film director. Her films address themes of femininity and women's issues.

== Early life ==
Peret was born on September 10, 1952, in Mexico City, Distrito Federal, Mexico. She attended and graduated from el Centro de Capacitación Cinematográfica in Mexico City, a film school founded by Mexico's National Council for Culture and Arts. According to Elissa Rashkin, Sistach was among a movement in the late 1980s of innovative female directors in Mexican cinematic history, along with Maria Novaro, Busi Cortés, Guita Schyfter, and Dana Rotberg. This movement was described as being "coming to terms with the past (with the past in images, with the past in the history of the country), the acknowledgement of one’s own sensitivity (romanticism recovered in a feminist way), and the emergence of magic realism as denaturalization of women’s world, as a way of making representation visible."

== Career ==
Her first film was short live-action piece ¿Y si Platicamos de Agosto? in 1980, for which she won an Ariel (Mexican Academy Award). Other films she has directed include Perfume de violetas (2001), El cometa (1999), Anoche soñé contigo (1992), Los pasos de Ana (1990), La niña en la piedra (2006) and Los Crímenes de Mar del Norte (2017).

== Legacy ==
Her films are a social commentary on gender inequality, violence against women, socioeconomic class and adolescence. Screening Minors in Latin American Cinema described Sistach's directorial perspective on these issues, saying, "films such as Sistach's highlight the socioeconomic divide between adolescence and sexual exploration in those higher up versus lower down on the economic scale. Moreover, they illustrate the lack of agency and recourse to justice available to adolescents on the lower end of the economic scale - especially female adolescents who are twice marginalized by gender and economic status."

According to Rashkin, Sistach's Los pasos de Ana (1990), along with Busi Cortés' El secreto de Romeila (1988) were the two most popular feature films directed by Mexican women of their time. Her films were described by critics as innovative, as they opened doors and created opportunities for women in cinema and film production. Perfume de Violeta was awarded three Ariel Awards, won over twenty prizes at the international film festival sphere, and was Mexico's official choice for the Academy Awards.

Rashkin stated that the works created a genre of "women's cinema" that took women characters beyond objectification. She further remarked that Sistach's work allowed for more autonomy for women in film.

Sistach stated that she "situated her filmmaking in relation to Golden Age melodramas by saying that her films responded to classical films' reduction of women to the roles of 'good mother' or 'prostitute' [...] she created 'a kind of woman who exists in the Mexican reality, but who has not been represented on the screen before.'" She aimed to reshape the portrayal of women in Mexican cinema, saying,

"I believe that women have to invent, in our field of work, a new language that will be nourished by the common experiences of our individual histories. This woman’s word should be inscribed in our culture. To destroy the false mirror of woman that is, in general, the cinema. . . . It means reappropriating our image and in doing so, seeking our identity."

Critics have stated that Sistach's films are unique in that they portray controversial themes and messages that address the powerlessness of minority groups. In "Screening Minors in Latin American Cinema", author Traci Roberts-Camps describes the impact of Sistach's films, explaining,

"Sistach portrays protagonists who have less agency because they are young, female, and working class— these factors affect their ability to 'resist, negotiate and transform' external forces of power. These three factors— age, gender, and socioeconomic class— combine in such a way that the young women have little recourse to justice after the violence they experience. In other words, they are powerless to affect change in the institutional structures that overlook or perpetuate this violence."

Sistach's perspective is to comment on societal constructs in Mexico as well as to present a feminist demand for change in patriarchal aspects of this society. Critic Diego de Pozo's commentary on Sistach's Perfume de violetas celebrates both of these purposes, stating,

"Perfume de violetas shows how the city and its economy interact, which in turn has an effect on individuals as manifested in family and social interaction and expectancies and including the constructions of gender. All of these elements are intensified in the broad lower-class. Sistach's film becomes a representation of how the urban setting, with its limited access and drive to attain capital, provokes sexual violence against females and transforms these citizens into agents of violence to secure survival [...] Perfume de violetas denounces the governmental and societal ignorance which affects females in Mexico. The protagonist interacts with a dominant culture and an urban space that provoke sexual violence against the female subject. The home and school spheres create the construction of gender which result in violence when females enter the public space."

== Filmography ==
Year	Title	Description
1980	¿Y si Platicamos de Agosto?	Two young people in the 1968 student's movement are awakened to love and social conscience.
1983	Conozco a los tres	A film of single and divorced mothers, responding to the 'nuclear families of classic melodramas'.
1990	Los pasos de Ana	A divorced mother decides to fulfill her lifelong dream of becoming a director, and begins to film everything she sees in her everyday life.
1992	Anoche soñé contigo	Two teenage boys hoping to spend their summer fulfilling sexual conquests and experiences are in for a surprise when one of the boys' older, more sexually experienced cousin Azucena comes to visit.
1995	La línea paterna	Using the home movies of his grandfather Dr. Jose Buil Belenguer, Jose Buil shows a personal history of his life, portraying the intimate life of Mexican domestic life in the small town of Papantia.
1999	El Cometa	After her father is arrested for publishing material contradictory to the regime of Mexican dictator Portifirio Diaz, young Valentina escapes to join forces with rebels in Texas.
2001	Perfume de violetas	The friendship of Yessica and Miriam, two young girls from different social backgrounds in Mexico city, is put to the test when one of the girls is sexually assaulted.
2006	La niña en la piedra	When teenage Gabi's romantic advances are rejected by Mati, he decides to take revenge.
2007	El brassier de Emma	Emma, undergoing adolescence, deals with a difficult family situation and her changing figure as she realizes breasts are the centre of the universe.
2014	La fórmula del doctor Funes	Dr. Funes invents a formula that can turn adults into young people and upon testing it on himself, he turns into a 12-year old boy.
2017	Los Crímenes de Mar del Norte	A young chemistry student Jorge and his girlfriend Paquita's relationship is put to the test when the police find corpses in the garden of the laboratory.
