= Araceli Velázquez =

Mexican politician (born 1961)

- Born: Araceli Velázquez Ramírez; 4 December 1961 (age 64); Hidalgo, Mexico
- Education: UNAM
- Occupation: Politician
- Political party: PRI

Araceli Velázquez Ramírez (born 4 December 1961) is a Mexican politician affiliated with the Institutional Revolutionary Party. She served as a federal deputy of the LIX Legislature of the Mexican Congress representing Hidalgo as replacement of Jorge Romero Romero. Previously, she served as a local deputy in the LIX Legislature of the Congress of Hidalgo and as the municipal president of Tepeji, Hidalgo.
