= 20th Lima Film Festival =

2016 film festival

- Official poster of the 20th Lima Film Festival
- Opening film: Memories of Underdevelopment
- Location: Lima, Peru
- Founded: 1997
- Awards: Trophy Spondylus: Dark Beast
- Directors: Alicia Morales
- Festival date: 5–13 August 2016
- Website: festivaldelima.com

Lima Film Festival
- 21st 19th

The 20th Lima Film Festival, organized by the Pontifical Catholic University of Peru, took place from 5 to 13 August 2016 in Lima, Peru. The awards were announced on 13 August 2016, with Dark Beast winning the Trophy Spondylus.

== Background ==
The event paid tribute to the careers of three individuals: Edgar Saba, former director of the Lima Film Festival, Belgian filmmaker Luc Dardenne, and Brazilian actor Lázaro Ramos.

== Juries ==
=== In Competition ===
==== Fiction ====
- Ciro Guerra, Colombian filmmaker - Jury President
- Ezequiel Acuña, Argentine filmmaker
- Daniela Michel, Mexican film critic
- Karim Aïnouz, Brazilian filmmaker
- Alonso Cueto, Peruvian author

==== Documentary ====
- Nicolás Echevarría, Mexican filmmaker - Jury President
- Gema Juárez Allen, Argentine film producer
- Aldo Garay, Uruguayan filmmaker

=== International Critics ===
- Rosalba Oxandabarat, Uruguayan journalist and film critic - Jury President
- Leonardo D'Espósito, Argentine film critic
- Claudio Cordero, Peruvian journalist

== Official Selection ==
The lineup of titles selected for the official selection include:

=== In Competition ===
==== Fiction ====
Highlighted title indicates award winner.

| English Title | Original Title | Director(s) | Production Countrie(s) |
|---|---|---|---|
| Incident Light | La luz incidente | Ariel Rotter | Argentina; France; Uruguay |
| The Long Night of Francisco Sanctis | La larga noche de Francisco Sanctis | Francisco Márquez & Andrea Testa | Argentina |
| Aquarius | | Kleber Mendonça Filho | Brazil; France |
| Neon Bull | Boi Neon | Gabriel Mascaro | Brazil; Uruguay; Netherlands |
| Oblivious Memory | Quase Memória | Ruy Guerra | Brazil |
| Neruda | | Pablo Larraín | Chile; Spain; France; Argentina |
| Much Ado About Nothing | Aquí no ha pasado nada | Alejandro Fernández Almendras | Chile |
| Lost North | Sin norte | Fernando Lavanderos | Chile |
| Dark Beast | Oscuro animal | Felipe Guerrero | Colombia; Argentina; Netherlands; Germany; Greece |
| Alba | | Ana Cristina Barragán | Ecuador; Mexico; Greece |
| Semana Santa | | Alejandra Márquez Abella | Mexico; France |
| Desierto | | Jonás Cuarón | Mexico |
| Epitaph | Epitafio | Yulene Olaizola & Rubén Imaz | Mexico |
| The Dreamer | El soñador | Adrián Saba | Peru |
| [wi:k] | | Rodrigo Moreno del Valle | Peru |
| One Last Afternoon | La última tarde | Joel Calero | Peru; Colombia |
| The Apostate | El apóstata | Federico Veiroj | Uruguay; Spain |
| From Afar | Desde allá | Lorenzo Vigas | Venezuela; Mexico |

==== Documentary ====
Highlighted title indicates award winner.

| English Title | Original Title | Director(s) | Production Countrie(s) |
|---|---|---|---|
| Somos Cuba: We Are Cuba | Somos Cuba - Wir sind Kuba | Annett Ilijew | Germany |
| The Pretty Ones | Las lindas | Melisa Liebenthal | Argentina |
| Favio: Chronicle of a Director | Favio: Crónica de un director | Alejandro Venturini | Argentina |
| Cinema Novo | | Eryk Rocha | Brasil |
| Curumim | | Marcos Prado | Brasil |
| Jerico: The Infinite Flight of Days | Jericó: el infinito vuelo de los días | Catalina Mesa | Colombia; France |
| A Secret in the Box | Un secreto en la caja | Javier Izquierdo | Ecuador |
| Loneliness Square | Plaza de la soledad | Maya Goded | Mexico; Netherlands |
| Tempestad | | Tatiana Huezo | Mexico |
| When Two Worlds Collide | | Mathew Orzel & Heidi Brandenburg | Peru; Spain; United Kingdom |
| Eldorado XXI | | Salomé Lamas | Portugal; France |

=== Parallel Sample ===
==== Opening film ====
| English title | Original title | Director(s) | Production countrie(s) |
|---|---|---|---|
| Memories of Underdevelopment | Memorias del subdesarrollo | Tomás Gutiérrez Alea | Cuba |

==== Made in Peru ====
A list of films selected for the 'Made in Peru' lineup is as follows:

===== Fiction =====
| English Title | Original Title | Director(s) | Production Countrie(s) |
|---|---|---|---|
| The Light on the Hill | La luz en el cerro | Ricardo Velarde | Peru |
| Old Town | Pueblo Viejo | Hans Matos Cámac | Peru |

===== Documentary =====
| English Title | Original Title | Director(s) | Production Countrie(s) |
|---|---|---|---|
| La señal | | Leandro Pinto Le Roux | Peru |
| Sarita Colonia, the Moral Truce | Sarita Colonia, la tregua moral | Javier Ponce Gambirazio | Peru |
| The Little Firemen | Los bomberos | Quincy Perkins | Peru; United States |

==== Galas ====
A list of films selected for the 'Galas' lineup is as follows:

| English Title | Original Title | Director(s) | Production Countrie(s) |
|---|---|---|---|
| My Friend from the Park | Mi amiga del parque | Ana Katz | Argentina; Uruguay |
| Campo Grande | | Sandra Kogut | Brazil; France |
| Real Beleza | | Jorge Furtado | Brazil |
| The Memory of Water | La memoria del agua | Matías Bize | Chile; Argentina; Spain; Germany |
| Between Fences | בין גדרות | Avi Mograbi | France; Israel |
| A Monster with a Thousand Heads | Un monstruo de mil cabezas | Rodrigo Plá | Mexico |
| Vanity | La Vanité | Lionel Baier | Switzerland; France |

==== Essential: The Ones from 2016 ====
A list of films selected for the 'Essential: The Ones from 2016' lineup is as follows:

| English Title | Original Title | Director(s) | Production Countrie(s) |
|---|---|---|---|
| Slack Bay | Ma Loute | Bruno Dumont | Germany; France |
| Elle | | Paul Verhoeven | France; Germany; Belgium |
| The Salesman | فروشنده | Asghar Farhadi | Iran; France |
| Sweet Dreams | Fai bei sogni | Marco Bellocchio | Italy; France |
| Loving | | Jeff Nichols | United Kingdom; United States |

==== Around the World in 8 Days ====
A list of films selected for the 'Around the World in 8 Days' lineup is as follows:

| English Title | Original Title | Director(s) | Production Countrie(s) |
|---|---|---|---|
| All of a Sudden | Auf Einmal | Aslı Özge | Germany; France; Netherlands |
| Girl Asleep | | Rosemary Myers | Australia |
| Karadima Forest | El bosque de Karadima | Matías Lira | Chile |
| Rara | | Pepa San Martín | Chile; Argentina |
| Perros | | Harold Trompetero | Colombia; Argentina |
| Kiki, Love to Love | Kiki, el amor se hace | Paco León | Spain |
| Captain Fantastic | | Matt Ross | United States |
| Pelé: Birth of a Legend | | Jeff Zimbalist & Michael Zimbalist | United States |
| Pinches actores | | Guillaume Dufour & Jerome Dufour | France |
| One Man and His Cow | La Vache | Mohamed Hamidi | France |
| All Roads Lead to Rome | | Ella Lemhagen | Italy; United States |
| Rumbos paralelos | | Rafael Montero | Mexico |
| Above and Below | | Nicolas Steiner | Switzerland; Germany |

== Awards ==
=== In Competition ===
==== Fiction ====
- Trophy Spondylus: Dark Beast by Felipe Guerrero
- Special Jury Prize: Aquarius by Kleber Mendonça Filho
- Best Director: Lorenzo Vigas for From Afar
- Best Actress: Sonia Braga for Aquarius
- Best Actor: Lucho Cáceres for One Last Afternoon
- Best Screenplay: Guillermo Calderon for Neruda
- Best Cinematography: Diego García for Neon Bull
- Best Debut: Alba by Ana Cristina Barragán
- Special Mention: The Long Night of Francisco Sanctis by Francisco Marquez & Andrea Testa

==== Documentary ====
- Trophy Spondylus: Tempestad by Tatiana Huezo
  - Special Mention: Eldorado XXI by Salomé Lamas

=== International Critics ===
- International Critics' Jury Award for Best Film: Dark Beast by Felipe Guerrero
  - Special Mentions: The Dreamer by Adrián Saba, Neon Bull by Gabriel Mascaro & The Apostate by Federico Veiroj

=== Audience ===
- First Audience Award: One Last Afternoon by Joel Calero
- Second Audience Award: La señal by Leandro Pinto Le Roux

=== Other Awards ===
- Ministry of Culture Jury Award for Best Peruvian Film: The Dreamer by Adrián Saba
  - Honorable Mention: The Light on the Hill by Ricardo Velarde
- Peruvian School of the Cinematographic Industry - EPIC Award: The Long Night of Francisco Sanctis by Francisco Marquez & Andrea Testa
- APC Signis Peru - Monseñor Luciano Metzinger Communicators Association Award: Alba by Ana Cristina Barragán
