= Edson Secco =

Brazilian artist and musician

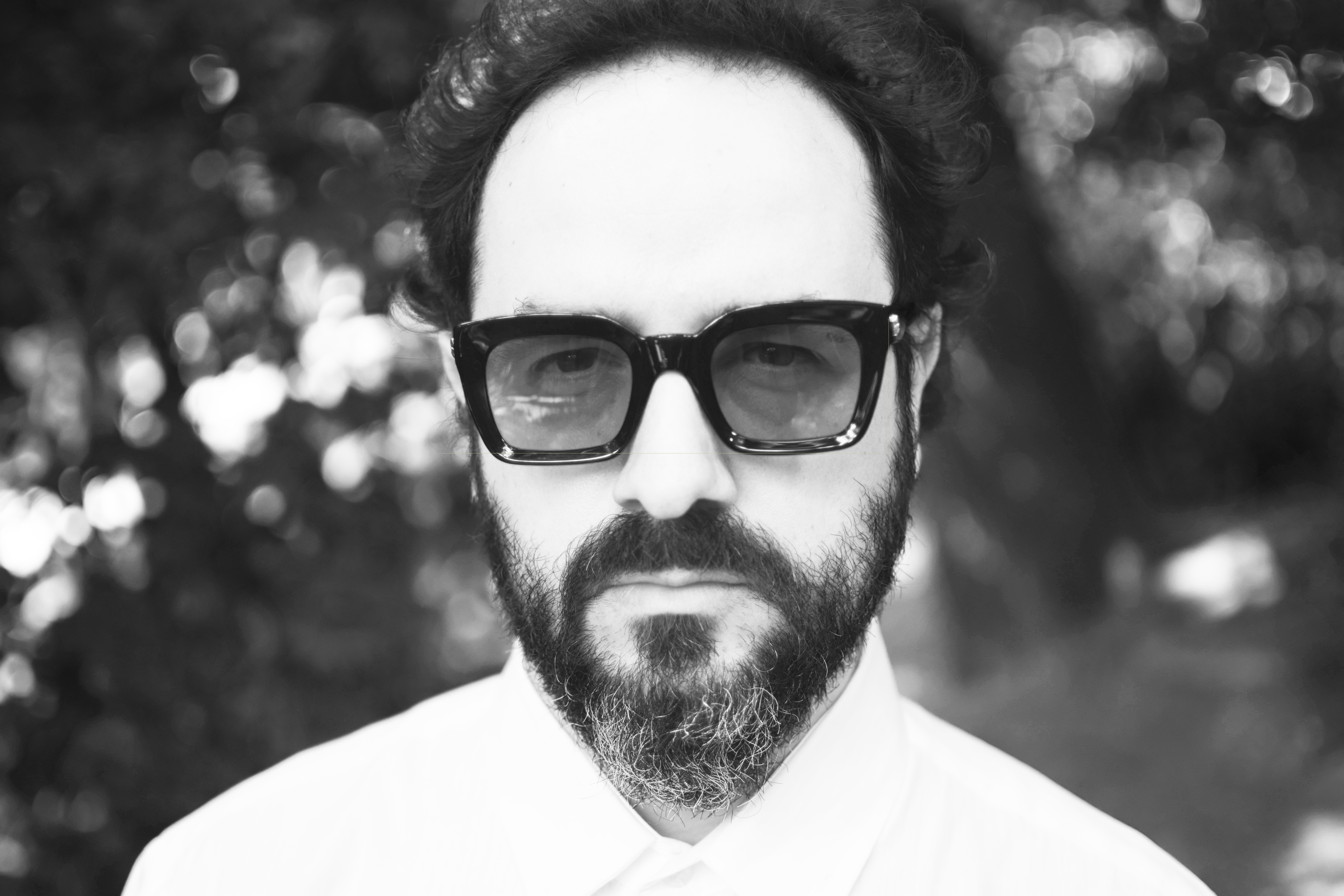
- 2019
- Occupations: Composer, musician, sound designer
- Years active: 1998–present
- Known for: Composer and Sound Designer for Film Industry
- Notable work: Paulina (La Patota), Cinema Novo

Edson Secco (1976, São Paulo, Brazil) is a Brazilian composer, musician and sound designer.

== Biography ==
He grew up in São Paulo influenced by a wide range of music, ranging from psychedelic music to classical, hip-hop, Brazilian and electronic music. He started composing at the age of 15 using a computer and a MIDI controller and his main instruments since then have been the piano, synthesizer, drums and computer. Sound manipulation, using different sources, became a hallmark of his work, bringing him closer to electronic music and experimentalism.

He began his professional career in the late 1990s as a music producer and sound engineer. At the beginning of the first decade of the 2000s, he began producing soundtracks for theater plays, as well as performing them live. In 2005, he joined the Companhia de Ópera Seca, directed by Gerald Thomas, being responsible for the composition, sound design and live performance of the soundtracks.

In 2006 he started his film career with the documentary Days in Sintra as composer, sound editor and sound re-recording mixer.

His work on the film industry earned him two nominations for The 3rd Platino Awards For Iberoamerican Cinema (2016), and the Academy of Motion Picture Arts and Sciences of Argentina (2015), respectively, as well as three prizes of Best Sound Design at the Brazilia Film Festival (2010 and 2013) and Gramado Festival (2013).

He is best known for his work with directors Walter Salles, Marcela Lordy, Bruno Safadi e Eryk Rocha.

As a musician he is part of the Brazilian electronic duo NU (abbreviation for Naked Universe), alongside the singer and songwriter Ligiana Costa.

Since 2016 he has been the director of SONIDERIA, a label and studio specialized in original music and sound post-production for TV and Cinema based in São Paulo.

== Filmography ==
=== As composer ===
- 2022: Lilith (dir. Bruno Safadi)
- 2022: Quando Falta O Ar (dir. Ana Petta, Helena Petta)
- 2020: O Livro dos Prazeres (dir. Marcela Lordy)
- 2020: Gabriel Medina (dir. Henrique Daniel)
- 2019: I Owe You a Letter About Brazil (dir. Carol Benjamin)
- 2019: Niède (dir. Tiago Tambelli)
- 2018: Vozes de Paracatú e Bento (dir. Walter Salles)
- 2018: O Pequeno Mal (dir. Lucas Camargo de Barros e Nicolás Zetune)
- 2018: Parque Oeste (dir. Fabiana Assis)
- 2018: Ser O Que Se É (dir. Marcela Lordy)
- 2018: Babel SP (Série) (dir. André Amparo)
- 2018: Elegy of a Crime (dir. Cristiano Burlan)
- 2018: The Cotton Wool War (dir. Cláudio Marques e Marília Huges)
- 2017: A Terra Treme (dir. Walter Salles)
- 2017: Sultry / Mormaço (dir. Marina Meliande)
- 2017: Los Territorios (dir. Ivan Granovsky)
- 2016: Two Irenes / As Duas Irenes (dir. Fábio Meira)
- 2016: Maresia (dir. Marcos Guttmann)
- 2016: Amores Líquidos (dir. Jorane Castro)
- 2016: The City of The Future / A Cidade do Futuro (dir. Cláudio Marques e Marília Huges)
- 2015: 5 Vezes Chico, O Velho e sua Gente (dir. Eduardo Nunes, Camilo Cavalcanti, Eduardo Goldenstein, Ana Rieper, Gustavo Spolidoro)
- 2014: Lygia Clark in Nova York (dir. Daniela Thomas)
- 2014: Com os Punhos Cerrados (dir. Pedro Diógenes, Luis Pretti e Ricardo Pretti)
- 2014: Hannya (dir. Diogo Hayashi)
- 2013: Venice 70: Future Reload (dir. Walter Salles)
- 2013: After the Rain / Depois da Chuva (dir. Cláudio Marques e Marília Huges)
- 2013: Éden (dir. Bruno Safadi)
- 2013: Pinta (dir. Jorge Alencar)
- 2012: Elena (dir. Petra Costa)
- 2011: Paralelo 10 (dir. Silvio Da-Rin)
- 2011: O Enigma do HU (dir. Pedro Urano e Joana Traub Cseko)
- 2009: Undertow Eyes / Olhos de Ressaca (dir. Petra Costa)
- 2008: Terras (dir. Maya Da-Rin)
- 2008: Days in Sintra / Diário de Sintra (dir. Paula Gaitán)

=== As sound designer and/or re-recording mixer ===
- 2023: A Vida Pela Frente (Série)
- 2023: A Mulher Sem Chão (dir. Débora McDowell, Auritha Tabajara)
- 2022: Lilith (dir. Bruno Sáfadi)
- 2022: Quando Falta O Ar (dir. Ana Petta, Helena Petta)
- 2021: Salamandra (dir. Alex Carvalho)
- 2020: De Dora, Por Sara (dir. Sara Antunes)
- 2020: Sobradinho (dir. Marília Hughes Guerreiro, Cláudio Marques)
- 2020: Mulher Oceano (dir. Djin Sganzerla)
- 2020: O Livro dos Prazeres (dir. Marcela Lordy)
- 2020: HARD (Série, dir. Rodrigo Meirelles)
- 2020: Ecstasy (dir. Moara Passoni)
- 2020: Gabriel Medina (dir. Henrique Daniel)
- 2020: Elas No Singular (Série, dir. Fabrizia Pinto)
- 2019: I Owe You A Letter About Brazil (dir. Carol Benjamin)
- 2019: Tuã Ingugu (Olhos D'agua) (dir. Daniela Thomas)
- 2019: Miragem (dir. Eryk Rocha)
- 2019: Tantas Almas (dir. Nicolás Rincón Gille) 2008: Diário de Sintra (dir. Paula Gaitán)
- 2019: Niède (dir. Tiago Tambelli)
- 2018: A Cidade No Brasil (Série)
- 2018: Unremember (dir. Flávia Castro)
- 2018: Vozes de Paracatú e Bento (dir. Walter Salles)
- 2018: O Pequeno Mal (dir. Lucas Camargo de Barros e Nicolas Thomé Zetune)
- 2018: Parque Oeste (dir. Fabiana Assis)
- 2018: Ser O Que Se É (dir. Marcela Lordy)
- 2018: Babel SP (Série, dir. André Amparo)
- 2018: Luna (dir. Cris Azzi)
- 2018: Elegy of a Crime (dir. Cristiano Burlan)
- 2017: A Terra Treme (dir. Walter Salles)
- 2017: Sultry / Mormaço (dir. Mariana Meliande)
- 2017: Invisible' (dir. Pablo Giorgelli)
- 2017: Strasbourg
- 2017: Los Territorios (dir. Iván Granovsky)
- 2016: Malícia (dir. Jimi Figueiredo)
- 2016: Amores Líquidos (dir. Jorane Castro)
- 2016: Pedro Osmar: A Liberdade que se Conquista (dir. Rodrigo T. Marques, Eduardo Consinni)
- 2016: Entre Idas e Vindas (dir. José Eduardo Belmonte)
- 2016: The City of The Future / A Cidade do Futuro (dir. Cláudio Marques e Marília Huges)
- 2016: Cinema Novo (dir. Eryk Rocha)
- 2015: Futuro de Junho (dir. Maria Ramos)
- 2015: 5 Vezes Chico, O Velho e sua Gente (dir. Ana Rieper, Eduardo Nunes, Gustavo Spolidoro, Camilo Cavalcante, Eduardo Goldenstein)
- 2015: Boi Neon (dir. Gabriel Mascaro)
- 2015: O Prefeito (dir. Bruno Safadi)
- 2015: Paulina (dir. Santiago Mitre)
- 2015: El Aula Vacía (dir. Lucrecia Martel, Flávia Castro, Mariana Chenillo, MAIS...)
- 2015: Tropykaos (dir. Daniel Lisboa)
- 2014: O Fim de Uma Era (dir. Bruno Safadi, Ricardo Pretti)
- 2014: Lygia Clark in Nova York (dir. Daniela Thomas)
- 2014: Com os Punhos Cerrados (dir. Ricardo Pretti, Luiz Pretti, Pedro Diógenes)
- 2014: Dominguinhos (dir. Mariana Aydar, Eduardo Nazarian, Joaquim Castro)
- 2014: Hannya (dir. Diogo Hayashi)
- 2013: Exilados do Vulcão (dir. Paula Gaitán)
- 2013: Venice 70: Future Reload
- 2013: After the Rain / Depois da Chuva (dir. Cláudio Marques e Marília Huges)
- 2013: O Uivo da Gáita (dir. Bruno Safadi)
- 2013: Éden (dir. Bruno Safadi)
- 2013: Pinta (dir. Jorge Alencar)
- 2012: Elena (dir. Petra Costa)
- 2012: Os Barcos (dir. Caetano Gotardo e Thaís de Almeida Prado)
- 2012: Jards (dir. Eryk Rocha)
- 2011: Passagens (dir. Thaís de Almeida Prado)
- 2011: Paralelo 10 (dir. Silvio Da-Rin)
- 2011: O Enigma do HU (dir. Pedro Urano e Joana Traub Cseko)
- 2010: Exercice du Regarde (dir. Thaís de Almeida Prado e Edson Secco)
- 2010: Náufragos (dir. Matheus Rocha e Gabriela Amaral)
- 2010: O Plantador de Quiabos (dir. Coletivo Santa Madeira)
- 2010: Transeunte (dir. Eryk Rocha)
- 2010: Vale dos Esquecidos (dir. Maria Raduan)
- 2009: Undertow Eyes / Olhos de Ressaca (dir. Petra Costa)
- 2008: Terras (dir. Maya Da-Rin)
- 2008: Days in Sintra / Diário de Sintra (dir. Paula Gaitán)

== Discography ==
=== Studio albums ===
- Plástico Bolha, 2004, SONIDERIA
- Asfaltaram a Terra, 2006, SONIDERIA
- Rainha Mentira, 2007, SONIDERIA
- Waste in Music, 2007, SONIDERIA
- Diário de Sintra, 2007, SONIDERIA
- Floresta Fantástica, 2008, SONIDERIA
- Terras, 2009, SONIDERIA
- Corrosivo, 2010, SONIDERIA
- O Ovo e a Galinha 2010, SONIDERIA
- Noisy Jam, 2010, SONIDERIA
- Anger, 2011, SONIDERIA
- Passagens, 2011, SONIDERIA
- Licht + Licht, 2012, SONIDERIA
- Brincar de Pensar, 2012, SONIDERIA
- Paralelo 10, 2012, SONIDERIA
- Nijinsky, Casamento com Deus, 2012, SONIDERIA
- Remote Heart, 2012, SONIDERIA
- 5x Chico, 2015, SONIDERIA
- NU (Naked Universe), 2015, Tratore
- As Duas Irenes, 2016, SONIDERIA
- A Dor, 2016, SONIDERIA
- Secas, 2016, SONIDERIA
- Pulso, 2016, SONIDERIA
- ZÉ (Single), 2017, Tratore / SONIDERIA
- So, I looked for you in every memory, 2019, SONIDERIA
- Rô-bots, 2019, SONIDERIA

== Theater ==
=== As composer and sound designer ===
2023

- Águas do Mundo (dir. Vanessa Bruno)
- Aquário com Peixes (dir. Marcela Lordy)

2022

- Play Beckett (dir. Vanessa Bruno)
- Diabinho e Outras Peças (dir. Guto Portugal)

2016

- Pulso (dir. Vanessa Bruno) - São Paulo/Brazil
- A Dor (dir. Vanessa Bruno) - São Paulo/Brazil

2014

- Brincar de Pensar (dir. Vanessa Bruno) - São Paulo/Brazil
- RÓZA (dir. Martha Kiss Perrone e Joana Levi) - São Paulo/Brazil

2012

- Nijinsky, Marriage with God (dir. Andrés Pérez Barrera) - São Paulo/Brazil

2011

- Remote Project (dir. Carolina Bonfim) - Barcelona/Spain

2010

- Chaux (Les Chemins du Sel) (dir. Coletivo Corrosivo) - Arc-et-Senans/France
- O Ovo e a Galinha (dir. Vanessa Bruno) - São Paulo/Brazil

2009

- Olhares entre Caldeiras (dir. Coletivo Corrosivo) - São Paulo/Brazil

2008

- Blog Soup Opera: "O Cão que Insultava as Mulheres, Kepler, The Dog!" (dir. Gerald Thomas) - with: Fabiana Gugli - Additional Music

2007

- Queen Liar (Rainha Mentira) (dir. Gerald Thomas) - Brazil and Argentina
- Luartrovado (dir. Gerald Thomas) - a funk opera adapted from Arnold Schoenberg's "Pierrot Lunaire" SESC Pinheiros June 2007
- Breve Interrupção (dir. Gerald Thomas) - performed at Satyrianas 2007, produced by Cia. de Teatro Os Satyros.

2006

- Earth in Trance (Terra em Trânsito) (dir. Gerald Thomas) - São Paulo/Brazil and La MaMa E.T.C., NYC
- Asphalt over a Kiss (Asfaltaram o Beijo) (dir. Gerald Thomas) - São Paulo/Brazil
- A Cube of Ice in Flames (Um Bloco de Gelo em Chamas) (dir. Gerald Thomas) - São Paulo/Brazil
- Ashes in the Freezer (Brasas no Congelador) (dir. Gerald Thomas) - São Paulo/Brazil

2005

- A Circus of Kidneys and Livers (Um Circo de Rins e Fígados) (dir. Gerald Thomas) - starring Marco Nanini - Brazil and Argentina

== Dance ==
=== As composer, sound designer, performer ===
2012

- Remote Project - New York City/USA

2008

- Waste In Process III - São Paulo/Brazil

2007

- Waste In Process II - Stockholm/Sweden

2006

- Waste In Process I - Rio de Janeiro/Brazil

== Exhibitions ==
=== As composer and sound designer ===
2016

- Santos Dumont na Coleção Brasiliana Itaú - Instituto Itaú Cultural / São Paulo / Brasil

2014

- Here. Now. Where? - 5th Biennale of Marrakech / Marrocos
- Ocupação Zuzu Angel- Instituto Itaú Cultural / São Paulo / Brasil

==== 2011 ====
- Stuffinablank - Noises In The Void / Barcelona / Espanha

2010

- Ocupação Rogério Sganzerla - Instituto Itaú Cultural / São Paulo / Brasil

2008

- H2Olhos - Instituto Itaú Cultural / São Paulo / Brasil

2007

- Imagem da Imagem - Instituto Itaú Cultural / São Paulo / Brasil

== Awards ==
Year	Award	Category	Nominated work	Prize
2010	Brazilia Film Festival	Best Sound Design	Transeunte, (director Eryk Rocha)	Won
2013	Brazilia Film Festival	Best Sound	Exilados do Vulcão, (director Paula Gaitán)	Won
2013	Gramado Festival	Best Sound Design	Éden, (director Bruno Sáfadi)	Won
2015	Academy of Motion Picture Arts and Sciences of Argentina	Best Sound	Paulina, (director Santiago Mitre)	Nominee
2016	3rd Platino Awards For Iberoamerican Cinema	Best Sound	Paulina, (director Santiago Mitre)	Nominee
2016	Prêmio da Associação de Críticos de Filmes da Argentina	Best Sound	Paulina, (dir. Santiago Mitre)	Nominee
2017	Festival Guarnicê	Best Sound Design	Para Ter Onde Ir (dir. Jorane Castro)	Won
2018	Santiago del Estero Film Fest (SEFF) / ASA	Best Sound	Invisible (dir. Pablo Giorgelli)	Won
