= Undertow Eyes =

- Directed by: Petra Costa
- Written by: Petra Costa
- Produced by: Petra Costa
- Edited by: Ava Rocha
- Music by: Edson Secco
- Release date: 2009
- Running time: 20 minutes
- Country: Brazil
- Language: Portuguese

Undertow Eyes is a Brazilian short film directed by Petra Costa.

== Synopsis ==
Vera and Gabriel have been married for sixty years. They discuss about their own history: the first flirtation, the birth of their children, life and aging. During their remembrance, images from their family collection mingle with images of the present. As a mosaic of stories and impressions, this short film looks like a personal and existential diary about love and death.

== Film Credits ==
- Production Director: Petra Costa
- Cinematography: Eryk Rocha, Petra Costa
- Screenplay: Petra Costa
- Direct sound: Edson Secco
- Original Music: Edson Secco
- Production Company: Aruac Produções
- Executive Producer: Petra Costa
- Editing: Ava Rocha, Petra Costa

== Cast ==
- Gabriel Andrade
- Vera Andrade

== Awards ==
| Year | Award | Category | Result |
|---|---|---|---|
| 2009 | Rio Film Festival | Best Short Film | won |
| 2009 | Gramado Film Festival | Special Jury Award | won |
| 2009 | Gramado Film Festival | Audience Award | won |
| 2009 | Vitoria Cine Video | Best Editing | won |
| 2009 | Itu International Film Festival | Best Screenplay | won |
| 2009 | Goiania Short Film Festival | Best Film | won |
| 2009 | São Paulo International Short Film Festival | New Talents Award | won |
| 2010 | Cine Las Americas International Film Festival | Best Short Documentary Film | won |
| 2010 | Curta Cabo Frio | Best Short Documentary in 35mm | won |
| 2010 | New England Festival of Ibero American Cinema | Best Short Film | won |
| 2011 | London International Documentary Festival | Best Short Film | won |
