= Petra Costa =

Brazilian actress and filmmaker

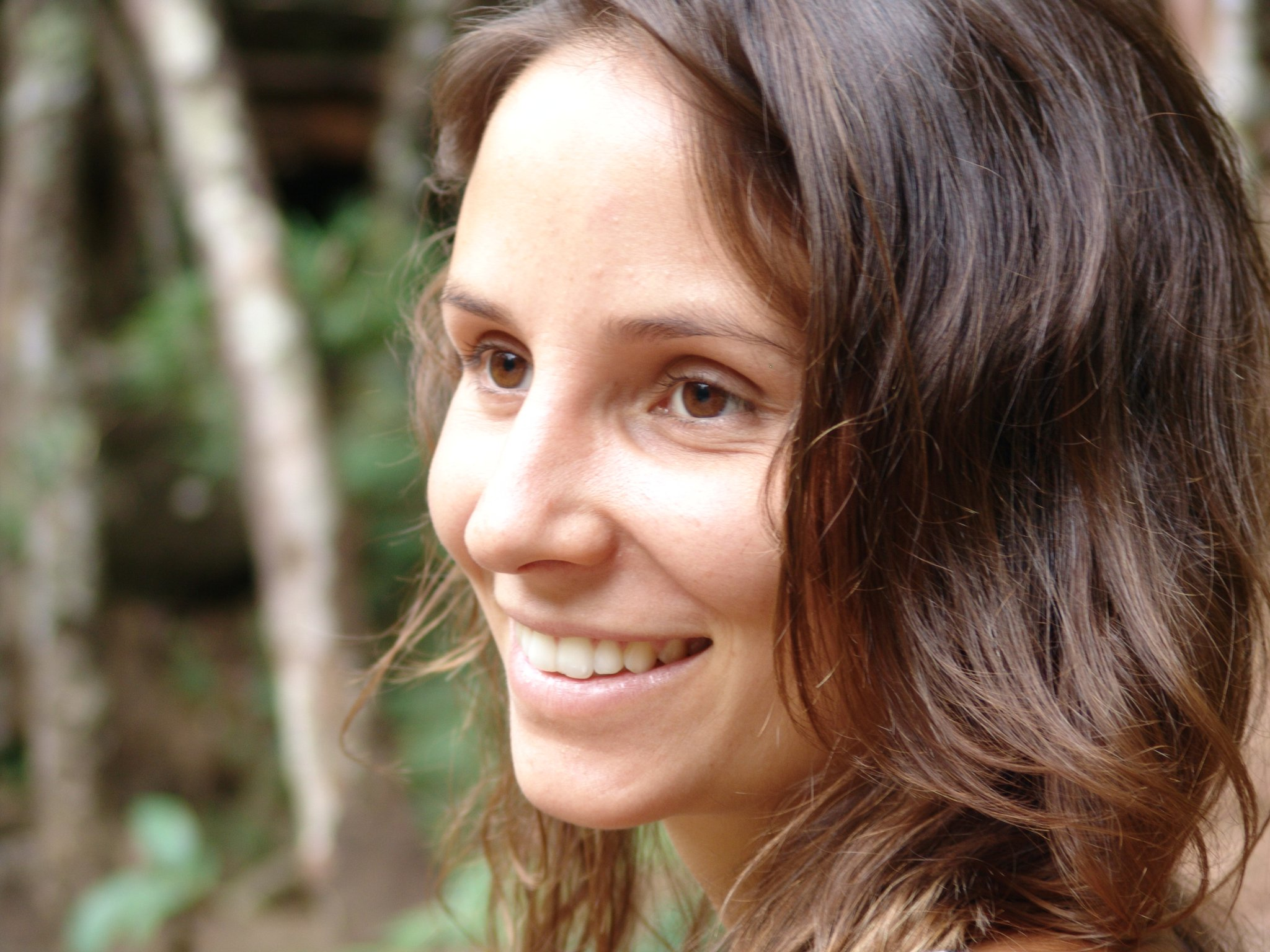
- Born: 8 July 1983 (age 43); Belo Horizonte, Minas Gerais, Brazil
- Education: University of São Paulo (attended); Columbia University (BA); London School of Economics (MA)
- Years active: 2005–present
- Notable work: The Edge of Democracy

Ana Petra Costa (Belo Horizonte, July 8, 1983) is a Brazilian filmmaker, screenwriter, producer, and narrator, and a co-founder of the production company Busca Vida Filmes. Petra has been a member of the Academy of Motion Picture Arts and Sciences since 2018. She is internationally recognized for her hybrid, essayistic approach, in which intimate themes such as grief, memory, trauma, and identity intertwine with historical events and contemporary political tensions. Her films have screened in more than 40 countries and received recognition at festivals such as Sundance, Venice, IDFA, Locarno, and CPH:DOX, among others. In 2020, her documentary film The Edge of Democracy was nominated for Best Documentary Feature at the 92nd Academy Awards and won a Peabody Award.

== Biography ==
Ana Petra Costa was born in 1983 in Belo Horizonte, Minas Gerais, and spent her childhood in São Paulo. She is the daughter of former federal deputy Manuel da Silva Costa Júnior and sociologist and journalist Marília Furtado de Andrade. Her parents were left-wing activists linked to the Communist Party of Brazil (PCdoB) in the 1970s and named Petra in homage to Pedro Pomar, a communist leader assassinated by the military dictatorship.

At the age of seven, Petra's life was marked by the suicide of her sister Elena, an event that would become the central theme of her first feature-length work. She began her artistic trajectory in theater, enrolling at the age of 17 in the Performing Arts program at the University of São Paulo (USP). She later earned a degree in Anthropology from Barnard College of Columbia University and completed a master's degree in Social Development at the London School of Economics, focusing on the concept of collective trauma.

Back in Brazil, at the age of 24, she began to devote her time to cinema, first as a researcher and assistant director, and later as a director. Her works are known for their essayistic character, with Costa establishing dialogues between intimate and personal themes and social and political issues. Among her cinematic influences are Gillo Pontecorvo, Agnès Varda, Chris Marker, and Patricio Guzmán.

== Career ==
Petra began her film career with the short Undertow Eyes (2009), a poetic portrait of love and aging based on the story of her grandparents. The film was screened at MoMA (New York) and awarded at ten national and international festivals: Best Short Film at Festival do Rio, the London International Documentary Festival (LIDF), the Cine Las Americas International Film Festival (United States), and a Special Jury Prize at the Gramado Film Festival, among others. In Undertow Eyes, Petra worked as director, screenwriter, and producer.

In 2012, she released her first feature-length film, Elena (2012), an autobiographical documentary that reconstructs her sister's trajectory and her own relationship with grief, the body, and memory. The film was widely acclaimed by international critics and became a landmark of contemporary Brazilian documentary cinema. It was screened at festivals such as IDFA, SXSW, and DocsBarcelona, and received awards in Havana, Brasília, Paulínia, and at Festival do Rio, among others. It was the most-watched documentary in Brazil in 2013. Elena also generated mental health awareness campaigns and was screened at universities, cultural centers, public schools, and in moderated sessions with specialists, integrating educational actions and social impact initiatives. In 2014, Elena was released in the United States, with executive production by filmmakers Fernando Meirelles and Tim Robbins. That year, it ranked as the fourth film in terms of average audience per theater in the United States and received numerous positive reviews. It was described as "a cinematic dream" by Stephen Holden in The New York Times, "haunting and unforgettable" by the Hollywood Reporter, and defined by "masterful debut that takes nonfiction where it seldom wants to go – away from the comforting embrace of fact and into a realm of expressionistic possibility" by Indiewire. Indiewire listed it among the best documentaries of the year. Elena premiered at IDFA followed by SXSW and HotDocs. It won Best Film at the 2013 Havana Film Festival, Best Film at DOCSDF, Best Directing, Best Editing, and Best Film for the popular jury at the Brasília Film Festival, and was nominated for Best Cinematography at the 2014 Cinema Eye Honors. In 2014, Arquipélago Publishing released the book Elena, featuring essays about the film, the screenplay, and previously unpublished content.

Olmo and the Seagull (2014), co-directed with Danish filmmaker Lea Glob, Costa's second feature documentary explores pregnancy and the limits of the body and female freedom within the creative process. The film follows Olivia and Serge, actors with the Théâtre du Soleil, who are expecting a baby. Pregnancy turns into a rite of passage, forcing the actress to confront her darkest fears. Olivia's desire for freedom and professional success, the limits imposed by her own body, and her image as a person are just some of the themes the film explores.

The work blends reality and fiction in a hybrid and performative structure. It received awards at the Locarno Film Festival (Best Documentary – Critics' Week), Nordic Dox Award at CPH:DOX, Festival do Rio (Young Jury Award) Best Documentary at the Cairo Film Festival and Best Narrative at the RiverRun International Film Festival, and was screened at FID Marseille, among others. At one of the film's first screenings in Brazil, Costa defended women's right to autonomy over their bodies and the decriminalization of abortion, and her comments stirred up quite a controversy. To respond to the criticism she received, Costa created the "My body, my rules" social media campaign, which was seen by 13 million viewers on Facebook and YouTube.

Her next project began with coverage of demonstrations for and against the impeachment of President Dilma Rousseff in 2016 and resulted in the feature-length film The Edge of Democracy (2019). On June 19, 2019, The Edge of Democracy premiered worldwide on the opening night at the Sundance Film Festival and was subsequently acquired by Netflix, becoming one of the most widely watched Brazilian documentaries globally. The film follows the impeachment process of President Dilma Rousseff and the Brazilian political crisis from a personal and family perspective. With ample access to presidents Lula, Dilma and Bolsonaro, the director also revisited her own family history in an attempt to understand the schismatic state her country had fallen into. It received dozens of awards and nominations, including an Academy Award nomination for Best Documentary Feature and the Platino Award for Best Director. It was selected for screening at various other international festivals, including CPH:DOX, True False, IndieLisboa, Sheffield and Rooftop Films. The film was a critical success.The work was accompanied by an international campaign of debates on democracy, authoritarianism, media, and political polarization, with moderated screenings at universities, parliaments, and collectives around the world. The film was well received by international critics. "An absolutely vital documentary", according to the New York Post, "a vast and petrifying documentary" for Variety, while ScreenDaily described it as a "political thriller […] with the feel of an All the presidents Men […] and the sweep of the Godfather". For NBC News, the film throws the doors open on "incredible behind the scenes access to politics". "The images are jaw-dropping", said the site Firstshowing.net, while Point of View labelled it "[a documentary] like no other, a work both intimate and grand in scope". Costa was ranked among Variety's 10 documentary filmmakers to watch in 2019.

Still in 2020, she co-produced the film Êxtase in partnership with director Moara Passoni, who, in her debut film, portrays Clara's agony in living with an obsession with food and the resulting challenges of anorexia faced by the young woman. The film was a highlight at the 43rd São Paulo International Film Festival. In 2023, Petra was invited to serve on the jury of the Sundance Film Festival, alongside Alexander Nanau and Karim Amer.

In 2024, Petra released Apocalypse in the Tropics (2024), a documentary that investigates the entanglement between religion and politics in Brazil and the role of evangelical apocalyptic ideologies and the influence of evangelical Christianity on far-right politics in Brazil, in support of Jair Bolsonaro. The film premiered out of competition at the 81st Venice International Film Festival, on 29 August 2024 and it was given a limited release in the United States on 11 July 2025, prior to its global release on Netflix on 14 July 2025. Based on the film, an impact campaign was organized with discussion circles at universities, churches, and cineclubs, promoting debates on faith, democracy, and the role of religious leadership in Brazilian politics. Throughout the second half of 2025, meetings with evangelical leaders and researchers took place in several cities such as São Paulo, Rio de Janeiro, Salvador, Curitiba, and Fortaleza, aiming to build bridges of listening and democratic resistance.

== Filmography ==
Year	English title	Original title	Notes
2005	Dom Quixote de Bethlehem		
2009	Undertow Eyes	Olhos de Ressaca	Short film
2012	Elena		
2015	Olmo and the Seagull	O Olmo e a Gaivota	
2019	The Edge of Democracy	Democracia em Vertigem	Academy Award for Best Documentary Feature Film – Nominee
2020	Êxtase		
2024	Apocalypse in the Tropics	Apocalipse nos Trópicos	

== Awards ==
Year	Award	Category	Nominated work
2009	Rio Film Festival	Best Short Film	Undertow Eyes
2009	Gramado Film Festival	Special Jury Award	Undertow Eyes
2009	Gramado Film Festival	Audience Award	Undertow Eyes
2009	Vitoria Cine Video	Best Editing	Undertow Eyes
2009	Itu International Film Festival	Best Screenplay	Undertow Eyes
2009	Goiania Short Film Festival	Best Film	Undertow Eyes
2009	São Paulo International Short Film Festival	New Talents Award	Undertow Eyes
2009	São Paulo International Short Film Festival	Top 10 Audience Favorites	Undertow Eyes
2010	Cine Las Americas International Film Festival	Best Short Documentary Film	Undertow Eyes
2010	Curta Cabo Frio	Best Short Documentary in 35mm	Undertow Eyes
2010	New England Festival of Ibero American Cinema	Best Short Film	Undertow Eyes
2011	London International Documentary Festival	Best Short Film	Undertow Eyes
2012	Brasília National Film Festival	Best Documentary	Elena
2012	Brasília National Film Festival	Audience Award	Elena
2012	Brasília National Film Festival	Best Directing	Elena
2012	Brasília National Film Festival	Editing	Elena
2012	Brasília National Film Festival	Production Design	Elena
2013	Guadalajara Film Festival	Special Mention	Elena
2013	ZagrebDox Documentary Film Festival	Special Mention	Elena
2013	Films de Femmes	Best Documentary Feature	Elena
2013	Planete + Doc Film Festival	CANON Cinematography Award for best Cinematography	Elena
2013	Cine Música – Festival de Cinema de Conservatória	Best Original Music	Elena
2013	Havana Film Festival	Best Documentary Feature	Elena
2013	Los Angeles Brazilian Film Festival	Best Documentary Feature	Elena
2013	Festival Sesc Melhores Filmes	Best Documentary – Audience Jury	Elena
2013	Cinema Brazil Grand Prize	Best Documentary – Audience Jury	Elena
2013	Cinema Brazil Grand Prize	Best Editing	Elena
2013	Arlington International Film Festival (AIFF)	Best Film	Elena
2014	CPH:DOX	Best Nordic Dox Award	Olmo and the Seagull
2015	Cairo International Film Festival	Special Mention	Olmo and the Seagull
2015	Rio de Janeiro International Film Festival	Best Documentary	Olmo and the Seagull
2015	Vienale	Best Documentary	Olmo and the Seagull
2015	Locarno International Film Festival	Junior Jury Award	Olmo and the Seagull
2016	Cinema Brazil Grand Prize	Best Foreign-Language Film	Olmo and the Seagull
2016	Millennium Docs Against Gravity	Fiction Non-Fiction Award	Olmo and the Seagull
2016	RiverRun International Film Festival	Audience Choice Award	Olmo and the Seagull
2019	Sundance Film Festival	Best Documentary (Nomination)	The Edge of Democracy
2019	CPH:DOX	CPH:DOX Award (Nomination)	The Edge of Democracy
2019	San Francisco International Film Festival	Best Documentary (Nomination)	The Edge of Democracy
2019	Hot Docs Documentary Festival	Best International Documentary (Nomination)	The Edge of Democracy
2019	Wisconsin Film Festival	Best International Documentary (Nomination)	The Edge of Democracy
2019	Minneapolis St. Paul International Film Festival	Spotlight: Best Breakthrough Documentary (Nomination)	The Edge of Democracy
2019	Sheffield International Documentary Festival	Tim Hetherington Award	The Edge of Democracy
2020	Gotham Awards	Best Documentary (Nomination)	The Edge of Democracy
2020	Gotham Awards	Audience Award (Nomination)	The Edge of Democracy
2020	Critics Choice Documentary Award	Best Political Documentary (Nomination)	The Edge of Democracy
2020	Critics Choice Documentary Award	Best Narration (Nomination)	The Edge of Democracy
2020	Havana Film Festival	Best Documentary (Nomination)	The Edge of Democracy
2020	Doc NYC	Directing Award	The Edge of Democracy
2020	35° International Documentary Association	Best Screenplay (Nomination)	The Edge of Democracy
2020	35° International Documentary Association	Best Director (Nomination)	The Edge of Democracy
2020	35° International Documentary Association	Best Feature (Nomination)	The Edge of Democracy
2020	Peabody Awards	Best Documentary	The Edge of Democracy
2020	Platino Awards	Best Documentary	The Edge of Democracy
2020	Latino Entertainment Journalists Association Film Award	Best Feature-Length Documentary (Nomination)	The Edge of Democracy
2020	92nd Academy Awards	Best Documentary Feature (Nomination)	The Edge of Democracy
2024	Montclair Film Festival	David Carr Award for Truth in Non-Fiction Filmmaking	Apocalypse in the Tropics
2024	Montclair Film Festival	Bruce Sinofsky Prize – Special Jury Prize	Apocalypse in the Tropics
2024	Montclair Film Festival	Bruce Sinofsky Prize for Documentary Feature (Nomination)	Apocalypse in the Tropics
2024	Denver Film Festival	Maysles Brothers Award (Nomination)	Apocalypse in the Tropics
2024	Miami Film Festival	Best Documentary (Nomination)	Apocalypse in the Tropics
2024	Festival do Rio	Documentary Feature Competition (Nomination)	Apocalypse in the Tropics
2024	Stockholm Film Festival	Bronze Horse – Best Documentary (Nomination)	Apocalypse in the Tropics
2024	Havana Film Festival	Best Documentary	Apocalypse in the Tropics
2025	Antenna Documentary Film Festival	The Special Jury Award	Apocalypse in the Tropics
2025	Antenna Documentary Film Festival	Audience Choice Award (Nomination)	Apocalypse in the Tropics
2025	Critics Choice Documentary Award	Best Direction (Nomination)	Apocalypse in the Tropics
2025	Critics Choice Documentary Award	Best Narration (Nomination)	Apocalypse in the Tropics
2025	Critics Choice Documentary Award	Best Political Documentary (Nomination)	Apocalypse in the Tropics
2025	Critics Choice Documentary Award	Best Documentary (Nomination)	Apocalypse in the Tropics
2025	Cinema Eye Honors	Best Production (Nomination)	Apocalypse in the Tropics
2025	41° International Documentary Association	Best Writing	Apocalypse in the Tropics
2025	41° International Documentary Association	Best Production	Apocalypse in the Tropics
2025	41° International Documentary Association	Best Direction (Nomination)	Apocalypse in the Tropics
2025	41° International Documentary Association	Best Documentary (Nomination)	Apocalypse in the Tropics
