= The Edge of Democracy =

2019 documentary film by Petra Costa

- Official poster
- Directed by: Petra Costa
- Written by: Petra Costa; Joanna Natasegara; Carol Pires; David Barker; Moara Passoni
- Produced by: Shane Boris; Petra Costa; Joanna Natasegara; Tiago Pavan
- Starring: Dilma Rousseff; Michel Temer; Eduardo Cunha; Luiz Inácio Lula da Silva
- Cinematography: João Atala
- Music by: Vitor Araújo; Rodrigo Leão; Gilberto Monte; Lucas Santtana
- Production companies: Busca Vida Filmes; Violet Films
- Distributed by: Netflix
- Release dates: January 24, 2019 (Sundance); June 19, 2019 (Netflix)
- Running time: 121 minutes
- Countries: Brazil; United Kingdom
- Languages: Portuguese; English

The Edge of Democracy (Portuguese: Democracia em Vertigem) is a 2019 documentary film directed by Petra Costa. The film follows the political past of the filmmaker in a personal way, in context with the first and second term of President Lula (2003-2011) and the events leading to the impeachment of Dilma Rousseff, analyzing the rise and fall of both presidents as well as the 2014 socio-political crisis that swept Brazil, and how Lula's 2017 arrest paved the way for Jair Bolsonaro's 2018 campaign and presidency.

The film had its world premiere at the 2019 Sundance Film Festival and was released worldwide by Netflix on June 19, 2019. It was nominated for Best Documentary Feature at the 92nd Academy Awards and won a Peabody Award in 2020.

== Synopsis ==
A cautionary tale of a democracy in crisis, the personal and political fuse in The Edge of Democracy explores one of the most dramatic periods in Brazilian history.

Combining access to Brazilian President Lula da Silva and former President Dilma Rousseff with accounts of her own family's political and industrial past, filmmaker Petra Costa witnesses and chronicles their rise and fall and the polarized nation that remains.

== Background ==
The Edge of Democracy is a Brazilian documentary directed by Oscar-nominee Petra Costa. The film was nominated by the Academy of Motion Picture Arts and Sciences (AMPAS) in 2020 in the category of Best Documentary, and it won a Peabody and Platino Award for the same category in the same year.

Although the film focuses on events in the South American country, it reflects a global phenomenon of polarization, political violence, naturalization of hate speech, and the rise of fascism to power. That was the reason why critic Anthony Scott, who included the documentary in The New York Times top ten films of 2019 alongside such acclaimed works as Martin Scorsese's The Irishman and Bong Joon-ho's Parasite, said Costa's work was "the scariest movie of the year".

The film's world premiere was held at the Sundance Festival in 2019. Later on the same year, it was also screened at the MoMA in a session hosted by filmmaker Spike Lee, who praised it and said that it "gives us another look at fascism, which is not only here, but is global". On June 19, 2019, it was released worldwide on Netflix, and, during that year, it was the second most-watched documentary of the platform in its country of origin, Brazil. It received the awards for Best Documentary from the São Paulo Association of Art Critics Awards and from the Peabody and Platino Award, it also received the Best Direction award from DOC NYC and was nominated in several categories in the awards of CPH:DOX, Critics' Choice Documentary Awards, Gotham Awards, International Documentary Association, Latino Entertainment Journalists Association Film Awards and Sheffield International Documentary Festival, among other international festivals.

In 2020, it was nominated for the Academy Award for Best Feature Film Documentary at the Academy of Motion Picture Arts and Sciences in Hollywood. The Oscar nomination had great repercussions in the Brazilian press, which highlighted the fact that the political polarization of this country had reached the ceremony of the most important award in the U.S. film industry. President Bolsonaro reacted violently saying the film was "crap" - despite having acknowledged that he had not seen it - and, through the Special Secretariat of Social Communication of the Presidency of the Republic, his government issued an official note (in Portuguese and English) calling Petra Costa an "anti-Brazilian activist" who "is defaming the image of the country abroad".

== Point of view ==
Political polarization is one of the central themes of the film. This is symbolically represented in a scene that shows a wall that was put up by the police on the Esplanade of Ministries in Brasilia to divide the demonstrators in favor and against the impeachment of President Dilma Rousseff in 2016, who were positioned, literally, left and right of it. On one side, it was a legal and legitimate process to remove from office a president who had lost popular support; on the other, what happened was a parliamentary coup d'état led by a corrupt congressman and a traitorous vice-president.

In the film, Costa does not hide her stance – regarding the wall and the narrative of the facts - and this radical sincerity, in the opinion of A. O. Scott in his critique published by The New York Times, "enhances rather than undermines the credibility of her report". Scott also points out how the film highlights the disappointment with the leftist party. Costa doesn't hide her political allegiances, and her candor enhances rather than undermines the credibility of her report. According to him, Costa's portrait of Lula, and Rousseff, “is hardly uncritical”.

Two striking facts receive special attention in the script: the impeachment process of President Dilma Rousseff, who occupies a large part of the documentary, and the arrest of former President Lula da Silva, ordered by former judge Sergio Moro (who, after the 2018 elections, abandoned the judiciary and entered politics as Jair Bolsonaro's minister). But Costa also makes use of several flashbacks that allow a better understanding of these facts from a historical perspective, revisiting key events such as the 1964 coup d'état, the 1964-1985 civic-military dictatorship, the 1978-1980 strikes, the founding of the Workers' Party in 1980, the election of Lula da Silva in 2002 (after three failed attempts to reach the presidency) and his succession through the impossible Rousseff-Michel Temer ticket in 2010, which the documentary portrays in unprecedented footage that shows the distance - even physical - between the president and her vice president at the inauguration ceremony.

Each of these facts is told in a dialectic relationship with the most personal testimony of Petra Costa, who also tells the story of her own family as a mirror of Brazilian political polarization: her grandfather a contractor who did business with the state during civil and military governments; a part of her relatives who celebrated the 1964 coup and, decades later, the impeachment of Dilma Rousseff; her parents’ left-wing activism, who were persecuted by the dictatorship, her mother a sympathizer of the Workers Party. On either side of the Esplanade wall, this intimate story, which recalls her previous documentaries, blends and complements the historical and political documentary that tries to explain the Brazil that elected Bolsonaro. In one of the most intimate footage in the documentary, Costa's mother dialogues with the already former-president Dilma and she talks about some of the most personal experiences of her passage through the government.

== Release ==
The 2h01min long film had its world premiere at the 2019 Sundance Film Festival on January 24, 2019. Netflix acquired the distribution rights and released it commercially on June 19, 2019, along with screenings in New York City and Los Angeles cinemas. In addition, the film also participated in CPH:DOX, the San Francisco International Film Festival, Sheffield Doc/Fest, the Hot Docs Canadian International Documentary Festival and the Montclair Film Festival.

== Reception ==
=== Critical response ===
The Edge of Democracy had received generally positive reviews from critics. As of October 2021, 97% of the 36 reviews compiled on Rotten Tomatoes are positive, with an average rating of 7.8/10. The website's critics consensus reads: "Assembled with absorbing insight and passion by director Petra Costa, The Edge of Democracy is a disturbing and expansive overview of how a democratic nation can teeter into autocracy." On Metacritic, the film has a score of 81 out 100, based on reviews from 13 critics, indicating "universal acclaim".

A. O. Scott of The New York Times praised the film, calling it "a chronicle of civic betrayal and the abuse of power, and also of heartbreak.". He wrote that "the facts and arguments she communicates should be studied by anyone interested in the fate of democracy, in Brazil or anywhere else. The feeling her film imparts will be familiar to anyone who has experienced the politics of the past few years as a series of shocks and reversals that call into question basic assumptions about the shape of reality. “The Edge of Democracy” is a declaration of faith in the reality principle, in the idea that it's both important and possible to understand what happened. Even if — or precisely because — none of us knows what happens next."

Leslie Felperin of The Guardian gave the film 4 out of 5 stars, saying, "Costa manages to craft an intimate primer about the state's descent into populism and the fraying of the country's democratic fabric." She also pointed out that "Costa’s voiceover adds shape but doesn’t intrude excessively and lets the powerful compilation of original and archive footage, material shot on the ground in the middle of riots and by drones soaring hundreds of feet above Brasilia, tell the story. That continual contrast between up close and in the fight and soaring high above is mirrored throughout by the film-maker’s perspective, always simultaneously part of the story and watching from a distance"

Jon Lee Anderson of The New Yorker praised the documentary and said "...Costa juxtaposes historic public events with remarkable private moments. It's as if we were watching a Greek tragedy, from a box seat and being conducted to the actors' dressing rooms between acts. In this ways, The Edge of Democracy presents a great ongoing drama of our time: the fracturing of democracy and its replacement by rank populism. At the end of this film, we are left shaken when Costa asks: "What do we do when the mask of civility falls and what appears is an ever more hauting image of ourselves? Where do we gather the strength to walk through the ruins and start anew?" Indeed. Where do we go from here?"

Kenneth Turan of the Los Angeles Times described the film as "completely fascinating" and said it "provides an unexpectedly compelling inside look at the political earthquakes that have been roiling Brazil for several years.". Turan also stressed that "far and away the film’s biggest asset is Costa’s sensibility. To hear her English-language voice-over is the equivalent of sitting next to the most fascinating person at a dinner party, someone able to knowledgeably fill you in on things you had little or no idea existed"

Variety's Guy Lodge referred to the film as transfixing documentary essay on her country's far-right takeover, painstakingly maps the chain of events that brought the previous government to its knees" and stressed that "Those familiar with Costa’s previous work, including the intimate, unorthodox works Elena and Olmo and the Seagull, will be unsurprised to find a poetic interior dimension to this current-affairs snapshot.".

John DeFore of The Hollywood Reporter wrote that the film "is as much an essay film as a primer on Brazil's recent history" that has "obvious relevance for those trying to get a handle on the rise of anti-democratic 'populists' all over the globe".

David Ehrlich, from IndieWire, gave the film a B-note and described it as "an angry, intimate, and haunting portrait of Brazil's recent slide back into the open jaws of dictatorship"

Allan Hunter, from Screen Daily, described the film as "a heartfelt lament for the short-lived dream of democracy in Brazil" and predicted that it could attract the attention of the international public for its "Intriguing parallels with the rise of right-wing, populist movements in America, Europe and beyond". In his critique, Hunter evaluated that "Costa’s use of news footage, tapes of incriminating conversations that were made public and acts of self-serving betrayal gives The Edge Of Democracy the feel of an All The President’s Men-style political thriller. Further revelations about her own family and the allegiances of earlier generations turn that aspect of the story into something with the sweep of The Godfather. She may not be able to fully explain the popularity of Bolsonaro or the nostalgia for the bad old days but her film offers an emotional, sobering insight into the conflicted soul of Brazil.".

Lawrence Garcia of the online newspaper The A.V. Club gave a mixed review praises the coverage of the themes, but criticizes what he saw as the documentary's lack of comprehensiveness: "Costa understandably places emphasis on the unjust political machinations of Brazil’s Lower House, but also glosses over the failures of Rousseff’s government and its incontrovertible manipulation of the federal budget."

Alejandro Lingenti of La Nación, Argentina's largest conservative newspaper, rated the film "excellent" and said it "holds up like a great thriller". In his criticism, he said, "Petra Costa's investigation [...] is rigorous and well documented. Her access to the intimacy of the main figures of the PT (Workers Party) at key moments of their passage through power is a value in itself. But the film is also enriched by her acute reflections: Costa does not hide her sympathy for the left of her country nor her criticism and disillusionment with a project that ended up sinking".

Elio Gaspari, of O Globo, draws the attention to the irony of the concept of impartiality, comparing the director of the film, Petra Costa, to one of its protagonists, former judge Sergio Moro: "Petra Costa is a filmmaker and Moro was a judge. The documentary has an explicit sympathetic bias towards Lula, but one should not charge impartiality to a filmmaker. Impartial would be Judge Moro. Was he?". Gaspari's article was also published in Folha de São Paulo.

Maurício Costa, of the Correio Braziliense, wrote that the film "seems to be directed more to foreign audiences than to Brazilians". In his criticism, he said: "It is not an impartial film, nor is it intended to be impartial. From the beginning, it assumes its position, but it is an honest film. There are no dissimulations, no inventions, no distortions. There is only a sincere and purposefully subjective analysis, which sheds new light on Brazil's recent history. As a film, The Edge of Democracy is engaging and powerful - it may arouse passion and hatred, but it will never leave the public indifferent".

Jerônimo Teixera of the Brazilian magazine Crusoé published a negative review of the movie stating that it: "twist the reality to say that democracy is at risk in Brazil [which] can deceive Hollywood, but it is only the narcissistic outburst of a non-conformed girl.".

Tales Ab'Sáber, of the Brazilian left-wing magazine CartaCapital, said that the film "has the merit of ordering the historical reading of an extremely troubled process of institutional disorganization and emergence of violence in politics" and that "nothing there is a lie, all that happened, all that is a historical matter in need of evaluation and fair reading".

=== Other criticisms and repercussion ===
Several renowned international filmmakers have praised The Edge of Democracy. At an exhibition held at the Museum of Modern Art in New York City, Spike Lee presented the film and said it "gives us another look at fascism, which is not only here, but is global.”

During an exhibition held in London for BAFTA guests, Wim Wenders said the documentary was "one of the most powerful things I have seen recently. It will touch your soul. And it will worry you. Not only because it's about Brazil - you'll learn a lot about Brazil, yes - but mainly because the film deals with all of us. It deals with things that are happening on this planet, in America and all over Europe. It deals with the fact that our democracies have been diverted and perverted".

In another screening, at Neuehouse Hollywood, in Los Angeles, Jane Campion said that the scenes in the film are like "love letters to Brazil, to the Brazilian people" and that it talks about "the explosion of the political system". She added that "we all grew up believing that democracy was a pillar of our lives and that it would never change, but it is not safe and it becomes clear that it needs to be taken care of". In the same sense, at another screening in Los Angeles, Tim Robbins said the film "is a reminder to all of us about how tenuous our democracy and freedom are, and how quickly they can disappear".

After the Oscar nomination, Caetano Veloso published in his social networks a video in English in which he talks about the situation of Brazil in the Bolsonaro government: "I never thought that in my life I would see so much regression. I spent my youth fighting against censorship in my country and against a brutal military dictatorship that put me in jail, and that killed and tortured many people. Unbelievably, now I live in another situation, within a democracy, in which fascism shows its claws. The Brazilian government is not only fighting a war against art and its creators, but also against the Amazon and human rights in general. To make this understood, I would like to draw your attention to a beautiful film by a young Brazilian woman, Petra Costa, who has just been nominated for the Oscar, The Edge of Democracy". The video was shared, among others, by American actress and rapper Queen Latifah. Chico Buarque also praised the film: "The Edge of Democracy, besides its cinematographic merits, which are many, has great historical value. Director Petra Costa was able to capture, in the heat of the moment, with sensitivity, with a sense of opportunity, the backstage of the political scene, especially from 2014, when the losers did not accept the result of the polls and began to plot with the support of a large part of the political class, of the big media, and with, at least, the complacency of the Justice, began to plot against the government of Dilma Rousseff". He also added that, with Bolsonaro in the presidency, the country "is ruled by madmen".

Pilar del Río said on Twitter that the film is "impressive" and that "Petra's narration is exciting. The camera is on the front line, you can see the night that will come after the night". Paulo Coelho congratulated the director on her Oscar nomination, said he was arrested and tortured in the military dictatorship, and still has "scars" on his soul, and said that Brazil has seen the return of dark clouds since President Bolsonaro took office. For the writer, The Edge of Democracy is an important film for the current situation in Brazil to be known.

Though the film drew generally positive critical reviews, it drew some negative reactions as well. TV presenter Pedro Bial, from Rede Globo, called the documentary "unbearable" and said that "it's a film by a girl telling her mother that she did everything right, that she's there following her mother's orders and inspiration, we're from the left, we're good, we didn't do anything, we don't have to do self-criticism. It was the bad guys in the market, these ugly people, white men, who hurt us and took us out of power because the PT (Workers Party) was always wonderful and Lula is incredible". After the criticism he received for the alleged offensive and macho tone of this comment, including by Dilma Rousseff herself, he wrote an article for O Globo asking for "peace" and the episode had repercussions in the Brazilian media.

The documentary also stimulated much debate within the Brazilian society, with director Costa's social media accounts becoming a place of intense political debate and growing interest from her followers (198.7k on Twitter; 349k on Instagram; and 86k likes on Facebook) Costa has been invited to share her political views in editorials for The Guardian and The New York Times, in which she wrote about President Bolsonaro's war against the truth and the erosion of Brazilian democracy, mirroring similar processes elsewhere in the world, especially the United States.

Michel Temer, who was one of the presidents portrayed in the film, said in an interview with Folha de S. Paulo that "the images are real, [the documentary is] very well photographed, very well produced, however, there is a political, partisan and personal stance that takes away the credibility of the film".

=== Accolades ===
Award	Date	Category	Result	Ref(s)
CPH:DOX	April 1, 2019	CPH:DOX Award	Nominated	
Sheffield International Documentary Festival	June 12, 2019	Tim Hetherington Award	Nominated	
Sundance Film Festival	February 3, 2019	Word Cinema Documentary	Nominated	
Academy Awards	February 9, 2020	Best Documentary Feature	Nominated	
Peabody Awards	June 10, 2020	Documentary	Won	
True/False Film Festival	September 3, 2019	Out of Competition - Latin America	Invitation	
17th Geneva International Film Festival and Forum on Human Rights	March 16, 2019	Documentary - Latin America	Invitation	
Critics Choice Award	November 10, 2019	Best Political Documentary Best Narration	Nominated	
Gotham Awards	December 2, 2019	Best Documentary Audience Award	Nominated	
Guadalajara International Film Festival	March 8, 2019	Retratos	Invitation	
International Documentary Association	December 5, 2019	Best Writing Best Director Best Feature	Nominated	
San Francisco International Film Festival	April 19, 2019	Best Documentary	Nominated	
Hot Docs International Documentary Festival	April 25, 2019	Best International Documentary	Nominated	
Ambulante Documentary Film Festival	February 21, 2019	Coleccion	Nominated	
IndieLisboa	May 2, 2019	Independent Hero	Invitation	
Full Frame Documentary Film Festival	2019	-	Invitation	
Wisconsin Film Festival	April 6, 2019	Best International Documentary	Nominated	
38th Minneapolis St. Paul International Film Festival	2019	Best Spotlight: Disruption Documentary	Nominated	
Havana Film Festival	2019	Best Documentary	Nominated	
Montclair Film Festival	Mars 31, 2019	Discover Together	Invitation	
Documentary Edge Festival	2019	-	Invitation	
Nantucket Film Festival	June 21, 2019	Best Documentary	Nominated	
Latino Entertainment Journalists Association Film Awards	January 2, 2020	Best Documentary Feature	Nominated	
Platino Awards	June 29, 2020	Best Documentary	Won	
Doc NYC	November 9, 2019	Directing Award	Won	
APCA Award	December 9, 2019	Best Documentary	Won	

== Soundtrack ==
No.	Title	Writer(s)	Length
1.	"Eu e a Democracia"	Petra Costa	0:11
2.	"Imagine um País"	Rodrigo Leão & João Eleutério	2:30
3.	"Oligarquic Alliances"	Lucas Santtana & Gilberto Monte	1:17
4.	"Introduzindo Dilma"	Rodrigo Leão & João Eleutério	1:54
5.	"Valsa Vermelha"	Vítor Araújo	0:52
6.	"Introdução"	Jaques Morelenbaum	0:44
7.	"Tsunami"	Rodrigo Leão & João Eleutério	2:00
8.	"O Começo da Queda"	Rodrigo Leão & João Eleutério	0:50
9.	"Coercive And Institute Lula"	Lucas Santtana & Gilberto Monte	2:16
10.	"Manifestações pelo Impeachment"	Rodrigo Leão & João Eleutério	1:48
11.	"O Congresso"	Rodrigo Leão & João Eleutério	1:02
12.	"Cunha"	Rodrigo Leão & João Eleutério	1:26
13.	"O Muro"	Rodrigo Leão & João Eleutério	2:58
14.	"Bolsonaro"	Rodrigo Leão & João Eleutério	3:18
15.	"Temer Ghost"	Lucas Santtana & Gilberto Monte	1:22
16.	"Carta"	Fil Pinheiro & Ricardo Herz	1:03
17.	"Funeral Marisa"	Rodrigo Leão & João Eleutério	1:41
18.	"Cunha Preso"	Fil Pinheiro & Zéli Silva	2:16
19.	"Democracia Doente"	Rodrigo Leão & João Eleutério	2:07
20.	"Sindicato"	Rodrigo Leão & João Eleutério	3:58
21.	"Lula Último Discurso"	Thomas Rohrer & Bella	2:10

== See also ==
- 2014 Brazilian economic crisis
- Chamber of Deputies, Brazil's Lower House
- Right-wing populism
- Operation Car Wash
