= 19th Lima Film Festival =

2015 film festival

- Official poster of the 19th Lima Film Festival
- Opening film: Dos besos
- Location: Lima, Peru
- Founded: 1997
- Awards: Trophy Spondylus: Embrace of the Serpent
- Directors: Edgar Saba
- Festival date: 7–15 August 2015
- Website: festivaldelima.com

Lima Film Festival
- 20th 18th

The 19th Lima Film Festival, organized by the Pontifical Catholic University of Peru, took place from 7 to 15 August 2015 in Lima, Peru. The awards were announced on 15 August 2015, with Embrace of the Serpent winning the Trophy Spondylus.

== Background ==
The event paid tribute to the careers of German filmmaker Werner Herzog, Arturo Ripstein and Paz Alicia Garciadiego, renowned figures in Mexican cinema, and Peruvian actor Gustavo Bueno.

== Juries ==
=== In Competition ===
==== Fiction ====
- Antonio Saura, Spanish producer
- Javier Fuentes-León, Peruvian filmmaker
- Diego Quemada-Díez, Mexican filmmaker
- Angie Cepeda, Colombian actress
- Gastón Pauls, Argentine actor

==== Documentary ====
- Justin Webster, British producer
- Eugenio Polgovsky, Mexican filmmaker
- Heddy Honigmann, Peruvian filmmaker

=== International Critics ===
- Rodrigo Bedoya, Peruvian journalist
- Edgar Soberón, Panamanian film critic
- Javier Porta Fouz, Argentine film critic

== Official Selection ==
The lineup of titles selected for the official selection include:

=== In Competition ===
==== Fiction ====
Highlighted title indicates award winner.

| English Title | Original Title | Director(s) | Production Countrie(s) |
|---|---|---|---|
| The Fire | El incendio | Juan Schnitman | Argentina |
| Paulina | | Santiago Mitre | Argentina; Brazil; France |
| The Second Mother | Que Horas Ela Volta? | Anna Muylaert | Brazil |
| Casa Grande | | Fellipe Barbosa | Brazil |
| Aurora | | Rodrigo Sepúlveda | Chile |
| The Club | El club | Pablo Larraín | Chile |
| Land and Shade | La tierra y la sombra | César Acevedo | Colombia; Chile; France; Netherlands |
| Embrace of the Serpent | El abrazo de la serpiente | Ciro Guerra | Colombia; Argentina; Venezuela |
| Alias Maria | Alias María | José Luis Rugeles Gracia | Colombia; Argentina; France |
| The Project of the Century | La obra del siglo | Carlos M. Quintela | Cuba; Argentina; Germany; Switzerland |
| The Wall of Words | La pared de las palabras | Fernando Pérez | Cuba |
| Ixcanul | | Jayro Bustamante | Guatemala; France |
| 600 Miles | 600 millas | Gabriel Ripstein | Mexico |
| Carmin Tropical | Carmín tropical | Rigoberto Pérezcano | Mexico |
| The Chosen Ones | Las elegidas | David Pablos | Mexico |
| The Last News | La última noticia | Alejandro Legaspi | Peru |
| Alone | Solos | Joanna Lombardi | Peru |
| Rosa Chumbe | | Jonatan Relayze | Peru |
| Magallanes | | Salvador del Solar | Peru; Argentina; Colombia; Spain |

==== Documentary ====
Highlighted title indicates award winner.

| English Title | Original Title | Director(s) | Production Countrie(s) |
|---|---|---|---|
| The Barbarian Trotskyism | El trotskismo bárbaro | Marcel Gonnet Wainmayer | Argentina |
| The Bolivian Case | El caso boliviano | Violeta Ayala | Bolivia; Australia; Colombia; United States |
| Tea Time | La once | Maite Alberdi | Chile |
| Beyond My Grandfather Allende | Allende, mi abuelo Allende | Marcia Tambutti Allende | Chile; Mexico |
| Carta a una sombra | | Daniela Abad & Miguel Salazar | Colombia |
| Burden of Peace | | Joey Bink & Sander Wirken | Guatemala; Netherlands; Spain |
| Portraits of a Search | Retratos de una búsqueda | Alicia Calderón | Mexico |
| Kings of Nowhere | Los reyes del pueblo que no existe | Betzabé García | Mexico |
| Cloudy Times | El tiempo nublado | Arami Ullon | Paraguay; Switzerland |
| Dibujando memorias | | Marianne Eyde | Peru |
| Your Parents Will Come Back | Tus padres volverán | Pablo Martínez Pessi | Uruguay |

=== Parallel Sample ===
==== Opening film ====
| English title | Original title | Director(s) | Production countrie(s) |
|---|---|---|---|
| Dos besos | | Francisco Lombardi | Peru |

==== Made in Peru ====
A list of films selected for the 'Made in Peru' lineup is as follows:

===== Fiction =====
| English Title | Original Title | Director(s) | Production Countrie(s) |
|---|---|---|---|
| Toxic Jungle | Planta madre | Gianfranco Quattrini | Peru |
| The Debt | | Barney Elliott | Peru; United States; Spain |

===== Documentary =====
| English Title | Original Title | Director(s) | Production Countrie(s) |
|---|---|---|---|
| Te saludan los cabitos | | Luis Cintora | Peru |
| Avenida Larco | | Antonio Rodríguez | Peru |
| Daughter of the Lake | Hija de la laguna | Ernesto Cabellos | Peru |
| Following Kina | Siguiendo a Kina | Sonia Goldenberg | Peru |

==== Galas ====
A list of films selected for the 'Galas' lineup is as follows:

| English Title | Original Title | Director(s) | Production Countrie(s) |
|---|---|---|---|
| Last Conversations | Últimas conversas | Eduardo Coutinho | Brazil |
| Allende en su laberinto | | Miguel Littín | Chile |
| Gabo: The Creation of Gabriel Garcia Marquez | Gabo: la magia de lo real | Justin Webster | Colombia |
| The Seed of Silence | La semilla del silencio | Juan Felipe Cano | Colombia |
| Between Cuba and Mexico, Everything is Bonito & Sabroso | Entre Cuba y México, todo es bonito y sabroso | Idalmis Del Risco | Cuba; Mexico |
| La imagen reb/velada | | Andrea Vázquez | Spain |
| Around the World in 50 Concerts | Om de wereld in 50 concerten | Heddy Honigmann | Netherlands |
| The Empty Classroom | El aula vacía | Gael García Bernal, Pablo Fendrik, Lucrecia Martel, Pablo Stoll, Diego Vega, Daniel Vega, Carlos Gaviria, Mariana Chenillo, Nicolás Pereda, Tatiana Huezo, Flávia Castro & Erik Rocha | Argentina; Brasil; Colombia; El Salvador; Mexico; Peru; United States; Uruguay |
| Dos besos | | Francisco Lombardi | Peru |

==== Around the World in 8 Days ====
A list of films selected for the 'Around the World in 8 Days' lineup is as follows:

| English Title | Original Title | Director(s) | Production Countrie(s) |
|---|---|---|---|
| As We Were Dreaming | Als wir träumten | Andreas Dresen | Germany |
| Volley | Voley | Martín Piroyansky | Argentina |
| No Kids | Sin hijos | Ariel Winograd | Argentina; Spain |
| Felix and Meira | Félix et Meira | Maxime Giroux | Canada |
| Mommy | | Xavier Dolan | Canada |
| Jerez y el misterio del Palo Cortado | | José Luis López-Linares | Spain |
| She's Funny That Way | | Peter Bogdanovich | United States |
| 5 Flights Up | | Richard Loncraine | United States |
| The 33 | Los 33 | Patricia Riggen | United States; Chile |
| Little Boy | | Alejandro Monteverde | Mexico; United States |
| Eisenstein in Guanajuato | | Peter Greenaway | Netherlands; Mexico |
| Tales | قصه‌ها | Rakhshān Banietemad | Iran |
| Desert Dancer | | Richard Raymond | United Kingdom |
| Mustang | | Deniz Gamze Ergüven | Turkey; France; Germany; Qaṭar |
| Big Father, Small Father and Other Stories | Cha và con và | Phan Đăng Di | Vietnam; France; Netherlands; Germany |

== Awards ==
=== In Competition ===
==== Fiction ====
- Trophy Spondylus: Embrace of the Serpent by Ciro Guerra
- Special Jury Prize: The Project of the Century by Carlos M. Quintela
- Best Director: Pablo Larraín for The Club
- Best Actress: María Telón for Ixcanul & Magaly Solier for Magallanes
- Best Actor: Kristyan Ferrer for 600 Miles
- Best Screenplay: Santiago Mitre for Paulina
- Best Cinematography: César Acevedo for Land and Shade
- Best Debut: 600 Miles by Gabriel Ripstein
- Special Mention: Alone by Joanna Lombardi

==== Documentary ====
- Trophy Spondylus: Carta a una sombra by Daniela Abad & Miguel Salazar
  - Special Mention: Portraits of a Search by Alicia Calderón

=== International Critics ===
- International Critics' Jury Award for Best Film: The Fire by Juan Schnitman & The Project of the Century by Carlos M. Quintela
  - Special Mention: Embrace of the Serpent by Ciro Guerra & Portraits of a Search by Alicia Calderón

=== Audience ===
- First Audience Award: Magallanes by Salvador Del Solar
- Second Audience Award: The Second Mother by Anna Muylaert

=== Other Awards ===
- Ministry of Culture Jury Award for Best Peruvian Film: Rosa Chumbe by Jonatan Relayze
- Peruvian School of the Cinematographic Industry - EPIC Award: Ixcanul by Jayro Bustamante
- APC Signis Peru - Monseñor Luciano Metzinger Communicators Association Award: The Second Mother by Anna Muylaert
- Peruvian Association of Film Press - APRECI Award for Best Film in Competition: The Club by Pablo Larraín
