= List of people from Key West, Florida =

- Vic Albury (1947–2017), Major League Baseball pitcher
- Bronson Arroyo (born 1977), MLB baseball player
- John James Audubon (1785–1851), naturalist, painter, ornithologist
- Elizabeth Bishop (1911–1979), poet, short-story writer
- Truman Capote (1924–1984), novelist, screenwriter, playwright, actor
- Eric Carle (1929–2021), children's book author and illustrator most famous for The Very Hungry Caterpillar
- David Allan Coe (born 1939), musician
- Tom Corcoran (1943–2023), author
- Sandy Cornish (1793–1869), farmer, businessperson, civic leader, former slave
- Mark Gormley (1957–2024), musician
- Paul Cotton (1943–2021), musician
- John Dewey (1859–1952), philosopher, educational reformer, psychologist
- John Dos Passos (1896–1970), novelist
- Stepin Fetchit (1902–1985), vaudevillian, comedian, film actor
- Mel Fisher (1922–1998), treasure hunter, best known for finding the 1622 wreck of the Nuestra Señora de Atocha
- Robert Fuller (born 1933), actor
- Khalil Greene (born 1979), MLB shortstop
- Ernest Hemingway (1899–1961), novelist, short-story writer, journalist, sportsman
- Winslow Homer (1836–1910), landscape painter, printmaker
- Mike Leach (1961–2022), college football coach
- Alison Lurie (1926–2020), Pulitzer Prize-winning novelist, academic
- Stephen Mallory (1812–1873), U.S. senator
- James Merrill (1926–1995), Pulitzer Prize-winning poet
- George Mira (born 1942), football player
- Diana Nyad (born 1949), author, journalist, motivational speaker, long-distance swimmer; famous for being the first person to swim from Cuba to Key West without the aid of a shark cage
- Bettie Page (1923–2008), pin-up model
- John Patterson (born 1967), MLB second baseman
- Quincy Perkins (born 1980), filmmaker
- Boog Powell (born 1941), baseball player
- David Robinson (born 1965), basketball player
- Thomas Sanchez (born 1943), author
- Shel Silverstein (1930–1999), author, cartoonist and musician
- Shane Spencer (born 1972), MLB outfielder
- Eleanor Washington Spicer (1903–1974), 28th president general of the Daughters of the American Revolution
- Randy Sterling (born 1951), MLB pitcher
- Wallace Stevens (1879–1955), Pulitzer Prize-winning poet
- Keith Strickland (born 1953), musician, songwriter, founding member of The B-52s
- Michel Tremblay (born 1942), Canadian playwright
- Harry S. Truman (1884–1972), U.S. president
- Blake R. Van Leer (1893–1956), fifth president of Georgia Institute of Technology, colonel, inventor
- Dick Vermeil (born 1936), former Super Bowl Champion NFL Coach
- Tony White (born 1979), defensive coordinator for the Nebraska Cornhuskers
- Tennessee Williams (1911–1983), author
- David Wolkowsky (1919–2018), real estate developer, preservationist
- Stuart Woods (1938–2022), novelist
