= La herencia =

La herencia may refer to:

- La herencia (1962 TV series), a Mexican telenovela by Televisa
- La herencia (1964 film), an Argentine film
- La herencia (2015 film), a Peruvian comedy film directed by Gastón Vizcarra
- La herencia (2022 TV series), a Mexican telenovela by TelevisaUnivision

== See also ==
- Herencia (disambiguation)
