= 21st Lima Film Festival =

2017 film festival

- Official poster of the 21st Lima Film Festival
- Opening film: A Concrete Cinema
- Location: Lima, Peru
- Founded: 1997
- Awards: Trophy Spondylus: The Family
- Directors: Alicia Morales
- Festival date: 4–12 August 2017
- Website: festivaldelima.com

Lima Film Festival
- 22nd 20th

The 21st Lima Film Festival, organized by the Pontifical Catholic University of Peru, took place from 4 to 12 August 2017 in Lima, Peru. The awards were announced on 12 August 2017, with The Family winning the Trophy Spondylus.

== Background ==
In July 2017, the Lima Film Festival officially announced its 21st edition, under the motto "Latin America without borders" (Spanish: Latinoamérica sin fronteras). The festival took place from Friday, August 4th to Saturday, August 12th, 2017. Tickets for the event went on sale from July 27th, 2017, at the festival's official venues.

The event paid tribute to the careers of two individuals: Canadian filmmaker Atom Egoyan, and Peruvian actor Gianfranco Brero.

== Juries ==
=== In Competition ===
==== Fiction ====
- Martina Gusmán, Argentine actress - Jury President
- Lorenzo Vigas, Venezuelan filmmaker
- Daniel Vega, Peruvian filmmaker
- Matías Bize, Chilean filmmaker
- Peter Scarlet, American artistic director

==== Documentary ====
- Joan Gonzales, Spanish director - Jury President
- Paola Castillo, Chilean filmmaker
- Paulina Suárez, Mexican writer

=== International Critics ===
- Eduardo Antin, Argentine film critic - Jury President
- Ricardo Bedoya, Peruvian film critic
- Carlos Bonfil, Mexican film critic

== Official Selection ==
The lineup of titles selected for the official selection includes:

=== In Competition ===
==== Fiction ====
Highlighted title indicates award winner.

English Title	Original Title	Director(s)	Production Countrie(s)
The Desert Bride	La novia del desierto	Cecilia Atán & Valeria Pivato	Argentina; Chile
The Idea of a Lake	La idea de un lago	Milagros Mumenthaler	Argentina; Qatar; Switzerland
The Lost Brother	El otro hermano	Adrián Caetano	Argentina; Spain; France; Uruguay
Vazante		Daniela Thomas	Brazil; Portugal
Joaquim		Marcelo Gomes	Brazil; Portugal
Gabriel and the Mountain	Gabriel e a montanha	Fellipe Gamarano Barbosa	Brazil; France
Los perros		Marcela Said	Chile; France
A Fantastic Woman	Una mujer fantástica	Sebastián Lelio	Chile; United States; Germany; Spain
Chameleon	Camaleón	Jorge Riquelme Serrano	Chile
The Dragon Defense	La defensa del dragón	Natalia Santa	Colombia
Medea		Alexandra Latishev	Costa Rica; Argentina; Chile
Santa & Andres	Santa y Andrés	Carlos Lechuga	Cuba; France; Colombia
Last Days in Havana	Últimos días en La Habana	Fernando Pérez	Cuba; Spain
The Night Guard	El vigilante	Diego Ros	Mexico
The Untamed	La región salvaje	Amat Escalante	Mexico; Denmark; France; Germany; Norway; Switzerland
Retablo		Alvaro Delgado Aparicio	Peru; Germany; Norway
Woodpeckers	Carpinteros	José María Cabral	Dominican Republic
The Family	La familia	Gustavo Rondón Córdova	Chile; Venezuela; Norway

==== Documentary ====
Highlighted title indicates award winner.

English Title	Original Title	Director(s)	Production Countrie(s)
Orione		Toia Bonino	Argentina
Soldier	Soldado	Manuel Abramovich	Argentina
In the Intense Now	No Intenso Agora	João Moreira Salles	Brazil
The Color of the Chameleon	El color del camaleon	Andrés Lübbert	Chile; Belgium; Germany
Adriana's Pact	El pacto de Adriana	Lissette Orozco	Chile
The Grown-Ups	Los niños	Maite Alberdi	Chile
El silencio de los fusiles		Natalia Orozco	Colombia; France; Cuba
My Aunt Toty	Mi tía Toty	León Felipe Troya	Mexico
In One Corner of the Soul	En un rincón del alma	Jorge Dalton	El Salvador
Devil's Freedom	La libertad del diablo	Everardo González	Mexico
Green River: The Time of the Yakurunas	Río verde : El tiempo de los Yakurunas	Alvaro Sarmineto & Diego Sarmiento	Peru
We Are All Stars	Todos somos estrellas	Patricia Wiesse Risso	Peru

=== Parallel Sample ===
==== Opening film ====
English title	Original title	Director(s)	Production countrie(s)
A Concrete Cinema	Un cine en concreto	Luz Ruciello	Argentina

==== Galas ====
A list of films selected for the 'Galas' lineup is as follows:

English Title	Original Title	Director(s)	Production Countrie(s)
Los ganadores		Néstor Frenkel	Argentina
Regreso a Coronel Vallejos		Carlos Castro	Argentina
Flavia de la Fuente's Short Films Program		Flavia de la Fuente	Argentina
Roberto Bolaño: La batalla futura		Ricardo House	Chile; Spain
The Animal's Wife	La mujer del animal	Víctor Gaviria	Colombia
Terminal		Christian Meier	United States
An Inconvenient Sequel: Truth to Power		Bonni Cohen & Jon Shenk	United States
The Orchid Seller	El vendedor de orquideas	Lorenzo Vigas	Venezuela; México

==== Made in Peru ====
A list of films selected for the 'Made in Peru' lineup is as follows:

English Title	Original Title	Director(s)	Production Countrie(s)
The Eyes of the Journey	Los ojos del camino	Rodrigo Otero Heraud	Peru
Nada queda sino nuestra ternura		Sébastien Jallade	Peru
Pacificum, Return to the Ocean	Pacificum, el retorno al océano	Mariana Tschudi	Peru
Deliciosa fruta seca		Ana Caridad Sánchez	Peru
El Abuelo		Gustavo Saavedra	Peru
Eternity	Wiñaypacha	Óscar Catacora	Peru

==== Essential: The Ones from 2017 ====
A list of films selected for the 'Essential: The Ones from 2017' lineup is as follows:

English Title	Original Title	Director(s)	Production Countrie(s)
In the Fade	Aus dem Nichts	Fatih Akin	Germany
Good Time		Josh Safdie & Benny Safdie	United States
The Beguiled		Sofia Coppola	United States
The Other Side of Hope	Toivon tuolla puolen	Aki Kaurismäki	Finland; Germany
Jeannette: The Childhood of Joan of Arc	Jeannette, l’enfance de Jeanne d’Arc	Bruno Dumont	France
I Am Not Your Negro		Raoul Peck	France; Belgium; Switzerland
On Body and Soul	Testről és lélekről	Ildikó Enyedi	Hungary
A Ciambra		Jonas Carpignano	Italy
11th Hour		Jim Sheridan	Ireland; Mexico

==== Around the World in 8 Days ====
A list of films selected for the 'Around the World in 8 Days' lineup is as follows:

English Title	Original Title	Director(s)	Production Countrie(s)
Maracaibo		Miguel Ángel Rocca	Argentina
Armero		Christian Mantilla-Vargas	Colombia
Amityville: The Awakening		Franck Khalfoun	United States
Saved by Grace		Johnny Remo	United States
Solace		Afonso Poyart	United States
It Comes at Night		Trey Edward Shults	United States
The Glass Castle		Destin Daniel Cretton	United States
Mr. Stein Goes Online	Un profil pour deux	Stéphane Robelin	France

== Awards ==
=== In Competition ===
==== Fiction ====
- Trophy Spondylus: The Family by Gustavo Rondón Córdova
- Special Jury Prize: A Fantastic Woman by Sebastián Lelio
- Best Director: Natalia Santa for The Dragon Defense
- Best Actress: Daniela Vega for A Fantastic Woman
  - Special Mention: Liliana Biamontem for Medea
- Best Actor: Gonzalo de Sagarminaga for The Dragon Defense
- Best Screenplay: Amat Escalante & Gibrán Portela for The Untamed
- Best Cinematography: Pedro Sotero for Gabriel and the Mountain
- Best Debut: The Desert Bride by Cecilia Atán & Valeria Pivato

==== Documentary ====
- Trophy Spondylus: Devil's Freedom by Everardo González
  - Special Mention: The Grown-Ups by Maite Alberdi

=== International Critics ===
- International Critics' Jury Award for Best Film: The Night Guard by Diego Ros
  - Special Mention: The Idea of a Lake by Milagros Mumenthaler

=== Audience ===
- First Audience Award: Pacificum, Return to the Ocean by Mariana Tschudi
- Second Audience Award: El Amparo by Rober Calzadilla

=== Other Awards ===
- Ministry of Culture Jury Award for Best Peruvian Film: Retablo by Alvaro Delgado Aparicio
  - Honorable Mention: Eternity by Óscar Catacora & We Are All Stars by Patricia Wiesse Risso
- Cine del Mañana Award: Complex Cases by Omar Forero
- Peruvian School of the Cinematographic Industry - EPIC Award: Santa & Andres by Carlos Lechuga
- APC Signis Peru - Monseñor Luciano Metzinger Communicators Association Award: Gabriel and the Mountain by Fellipe Gamarano Barbosa
