= One Last Afternoon =

- Theatrical release poster
- Directed by: Joel Calero
- Written by: Joel Calero
- Produced by: Joel Calero; Carolina Denegri; Carolina Herrera
- Starring: Katherine D'onofrio; Lucho Cáceres
- Cinematography: Mario Bassino
- Edited by: Roberto Benavides
- Music by: Karin Zielinski
- Production companies: Factoría Sur Producciones; Bhakti Films
- Release dates: August 6, 2016 (Lima); April 27, 2017 (Peru)
- Running time: 81 minutes
- Countries: Peru; Colombia
- Language: Spanish

One Last Afternoon (Spanish: La última tarde) is a 2016 drama film written, co-produced and directed by Joel Calero. It stars Katherine D'onofrio and Lucho Cáceres. It is the first film in Calero's memory trilogy, followed by The Most Feared Skin (2023) and Family Album (2024).

== Synopsis ==
A young couple challenges traditional norms, but after the wife disappears, they reunite 19 years later to confront unresolved questions, fears, and frustrations.

== Cast ==
The actors participating in this film are:

- Katherine D'onofrio as Laura
- Lucho Cáceres as Ramon
- Pold Gastello
- Juan Carlos Arango

== Release ==
One Last Afternoon was commercially released in Lima on April 27, 2017; it had previously been released on August 6, 2016, at the 20th Lima Film Festival.

== Awards ==
Year	Award / Festival	Country	Category	Nominated	Result	Ref.
2018	Peruvian Film Festival in Paris	France	Best Picture	One Last Afternoon	Won	
2017	Gramado International Film Festival	Brazil	Best Female Performance	Katerina D’Onofrio	Won	
2017	Gramado International Film Festival	Brazil	Best Screenplay	Joel Calero	Won	
2017	International Film Festival in Guadalajara	Mexico	Best Ibero-American Fiction Director	Joel Calero	Won	
2016	Lima Film Festival	Peru	Audience Award	One Last Afternoon	Won	
2016	Lima Film Festival	Peru	Best Actor	One Last Afternoon	Won	
2016	Lima Film Festival	Peru	Best Film	One Last Afternoon	Nominated	
2016	Valladolid International Film Week	Spain	Meeting Point - Youth Award	One Last Afternoon	Won	
2016	Punta del Este International Film Festival	Uruguay	Best Female Performance	Katerina D’Onofrio	Won	
2016	Rome Film Festival	Italy	Audience Award	One Last Afternoon	Nominated	
