= Deliciosa fruta seca =

- Theatrical release poster
- Directed by: Ana Caridad Sanchez
- Written by: Ana Caridad Sanchez
- Produced by: Andrés Malatesta
- Starring: Claudia Dammert; Mauricio Fernandini; Cinthya Calderón
- Cinematography: Juan Durán
- Music by: Pauchi Sasaki
- Production company: Totora Producciones
- Release dates: April 27, 2017 (Paris); August 6, 2017 (Lima); June 27, 2019 (Peru)
- Running time: 82 minutes
- Country: Peru
- Language: Spanish

Deliciosa fruta seca (lit. 'Delicious dry fruit') is a 2017 Peruvian drama film written and directed by Ana Caridad Sanchez in her directorial debut. Starring Claudia Dammert. The film is proposed as "a tribute to the marinera, to women and to the conquest of freedom."

== Synopsis ==
A 60-year-old widow is facing financial problems, so she decides to fend for herself, even without the help of her children. As a way to rebuild her life, she decides to learn to be a sailor, where she will meet an important person.

== Cast ==
- Claudia Dammert as Marialicia
- Hugo Vasquez as Carlos
- Mauricio Fernandini as Rodolfo
- Mónica Domínguez as Claire
- Cinthya Calderón
- Natalia Cárdenas
- Claudia Herrán

== Production ==
=== Financing ===
The film received support from Ibermedia in the 2011 Call. For post-production, it received the 2016 Feature Film Post-Production Project award from the National Contest of the Audiovisual, Phonography and New Media Directorate (DAFO) of the Ministry of Culture of Peru.

=== Filming ===
It was filmed in November 2013 in Trujillo, Peru.

=== Music ===
The film's soundtrack includes original music by Pauchi Sasaki and the marineras by Lucy de Mantilla. Among the sailors included are "Chucuturrita" and "Alma y corazón".

== Release ==
It premiered on April 27, 2017, within the framework of the Festival de Cinéma Péruvien de Paris. It was released on August 6, 2017, during the 21st Lima Film Festival. It was commercially released on June 27, 2019, in Peruvian theaters.

== Awards ==
Year	Award	Category	Recipient	Result	Ref.
2017	Festival de Cinéma Péruvien	Best Fiction Film	Deliciosa fruta seca	Won	
2018	Semaine du Cinema Hispanique	Audience Award	Deliciosa fruta seca	Won	
