= Melcochita =

Peruvian comedian

Pablo Villanueva Branda (born 17 September 1936), known as Melcochita, is a Peruvian comedian and Sonero singer, born in barrio La Victoria, in Lima, Perú. Known in the 1950s as Pacocha, he and his brothers created the band "Son Cubillas". He made various Latin music albums produced in Peru and New York, achieving some hits in the salsa market. Melcochita has acted as a comedian on Peruvian TV in the shows A Reír, Risas y Salsa and Recargados de Risa. Also, he stars in the feature films Gemelos sin cura, No vayan!! and Así no juega Perú. He was nominated for the Latin Grammys in 2019 for his new Song "La Momia".

== Discography ==
- Karamanduka y Melcochita with Mag Peruvian All Stars
- Picardías de Melcochita'
- A comer lechón
- La estrella del son (with Johnny Pacheco)
- Con sabor a pueblo
- Los hermanos de la salsa (with Lita Branda)
- Mis Mejores Éxitos
