= Herencia (disambiguation) =

Herencia is a municipality in the Province of Ciudad Real, Castilla-La Mancha, Spain.

Herencia may also refer to:

- Herencia (album), a 2006 album by Soraya
- Herencia (film) (Inheritance), a 2001 Argentine film

== See also ==
- La herencia (disambiguation)
