= Sunday Ball =

2015 film directed by Eryk Rocha

Campo de Jogo (Sunday Ball)
- Theatrical release poster
- Directed by: Eryk Rocha
- Written by: Eryk Rocha; Juan Posada
- Produced by: Eryk Rocha
- Cinematography: Leo Bittencourt
- Edited by: Renato Vallone
- Music by: Jorge Amorim
- Distributed by: Aruac Filmes; Filmegraph; Canal Brasil
- Release date: February 20, 2015
- Running time: 71 minutes
- Country: Brazil
- Language: Portuguese

Sunday Ball (Portuguese: Campo de Jogo) is a 2015 Brazilian documentary film co-written, produced and directed by Eryk Rocha.

== Synopsis ==
In the shadow of Maracanã Stadium in Rio de Janeiro, 14 soccer teams from the favelas compete in soccer matches.

== Release ==
The film received its North American premiere on 20 February 2015 at the Museum of Modern Art. On 3 May 2015, the film will be featured at the San Francisco International Film Festival.
