= Así no juega Perú =

- Theatrical release poster
- Directed by: Sebastián García
- Written by: Sebastián García
- Starring: Pablo Villanueva 'Melcochita'; Manolo Rojas; Karen América; Susan León; Miguel Vergara; Marco Antonio Miranda; Alec Chaparro; Gherson Flores
- Production company: Indie
- Distributed by: Star Films
- Release date: January 22, 2026
- Running time: 91 minutes
- Country: Peru
- Language: Spanish

Así no juega Perú (lit. 'That's not how Peru plays') is a 2026 Peruvian political satire comedy film written and directed by Sebastián García. It stars Pablo Villanueva 'Melcochita', Manolo Rojas, Karen América, Susan León, Miguel Vergara, Marco Antonio Miranda, Alec Chaparro and Gherson Flores.

== Synopsis ==
Three sex workers, replaced by foreign women, challenge a corrupt mayor by launching their own business in the conservative town of "Perusalén".

== Cast ==
The actors participating in this film are:

- Karen América as La Gaga
- Susan León as La Diva
- Miguel Miranda as La Chola
- Pablo Villanueva 'Melcochita' as Papá Melquiades
- Manolo Rojas as Roberto Cutrón
- Miguel Vergara
- Marco Antonio Miranda
- Alec Chaparro
- Gherson Flores

== Release ==
It premiered on January 22, 2026, in Peruvian theaters.
