= La herencia (2015 film) =

- Theatrical release poster
- Directed by: Gastón Vizcarra
- Written by: Gastón Vizcarra
- Starring: Tatiana Astengo; Christian Thorsen; Aldo Miyashiro; Alessandra Denegrí; Jesús Alzamora; Claudia Dammert; Korina Rivadeneira
- Cinematography: Rafael Vizarreta
- Music by: Josué Coveñas
- Production company: Aguardiente Producciones
- Release date: July 23, 2015
- Running time: 91 minutes
- Country: Peru
- Language: Spanish

La herencia (lit. 'The Heritage') is a 2015 Peruvian Christmas comedy film written and directed by Gastón Vizcarra. It stars Tatiana Astengo, Christian Thorsen, Aldo Miyashiro, Alessandra Denegrí, Jesús Alzamora, Claudia Dammert and Korina Rivadeneira. It premiered on July 23, 2015, in Peruvian theaters.

== Synopsis ==
The Bailetti family finds out that their grandfather has died and that he has left a large inheritance. To collect it there is only one curious condition: they must spend a weekend together. New and unknown members of the family from all over Peru will arrive for the meeting, generating a series of entanglements.

== Cast ==
The actors participating in this film are:

- Tatiana Astengo
- Christian Thorsen
- Aldo Miyashiro
- Alessandra Denegrí
- Jesús Alzamora
- Claudia Dammert
- Korina Rivadeneira

== Production ==
The film began filming at the end of January 2015 in Lima, Peru.

== Reception ==
=== Critical reception ===
Sebastián Zavala from cinencuentro.com wrote: "La herencia is a bad movie. It has salvageable elements, some good performances and it is not very long, but as a comedy, as a professional audiovisual product, it is quite disastrous." On the other hand, Omar Cáceres from Lamula.pe wrote: "La herencia is a nice film that respects the viewer. It won't cause many laughs, it won't be the great story one would expect from a comedy, but it won't be visually degrading. Maybe with an improvement in the script (a riskier and less predictable story) it would have worked better."

=== Box-office ===
The film attracted 127,714 viewers throughout its run in Peruvian theaters.
