= The Twelve Apostles (film) =

- Promotional release poster
- Directed by: Jorge Marín
- Starring: Javier Echevarría; Ghiis Araoz; Claudia Dammert
- Production companies: Sindicato de Artistas Intérpretes del Perú; Asociación Cultural de la Comunidad Artística Nacional; Cinemedia Films
- Release date: July 28, 2022
- Country: Peru
- Language: Spanish

The Twelve Apostles (Spanish: Los doce apóstoles) is a 2022 Peruvian political thriller action film directed by Jorge Marín in his directorial debut. Starring Javier Echevarría, Ghiis Araoz and Claudia Dammert in her last acting role after her death in 2017.

== Synopsis ==
A businessman is pursued by justice after being accused of money laundering and drug trafficking. This in retaliation after refusing to be a candidate for the presidency of the country under the directives of a powerful group, who direct the governments in power behind the shadows.

== Cast ==
- Javier Echevarría as Benjamín Jiménez de Orbegoso
- Ghiis Araoz as Mariana
- Claudia Dammert as Herminia
- Hugo Salazar
- Haydée Cáceres
- Americo Zuñiga
- Cecilia Tosso
- Nicolás León
- Luis Trivelli
- Cecilia Monserrate
- Kukuli Morante
- Marisol Tobalina
- Candela Showoman
- Jorge Da Fieno

== Release ==
The film was released digitally on July 28, 2022, by Joinnus.
