= Gemelos sin cura =

- Theatrical release poster
- Directed by: Carlos Landeo
- Written by: Liliana Alvarez
- Starring: Pablo "Melcochita" Villanueva
- Cinematography: Freddi Hernandez
- Production company: Star Films
- Release date: July 27, 2017
- Running time: 97 minutes
- Country: Peru
- Language: Spanish

Gemelos sin cura (lit. 'Twins without cure') is a 2017 Peruvian comedy film directed by Carlos Landeo and written by Liliana Alvarez. It stars Pablo 'Melcochita' Villanueva in his acting debut in a film. It premiered on July 27, 2017 in Peruvian theaters.

== Synopsis ==
Pedro and Pablo are two twin brothers. Pedro is a canteen musician who dedicates himself to scamming and getting easy money. Pablo is a neighborhood priest, an honest man and somewhat shy. When Pedro is persecuted for a large debt, he goes to his brother's church to ask for help. Thus, both, due to different situations, will be forced to impersonate the other until they find solutions to their problems.

== Cast ==
The actors participating in this film are:

- Pablo "Melcochita" Villanueva as Pedro / Pablo
- Hernán Romero as Obispo Berrios
- Samuel Sunderland as Monaguillo Roberto
- Giovanna Varcárcel as Lieutenant Claudia Anaya
- Daniela Ramírez as Andrea
- Nico Ames as "El Tripa"
- Sergio Galliani as 'El Loco' Daniel
- Claudia Dammert as Hermana María
- Tatiana Espinoza as Carmen
- Ricardo Cabrera as Father Panchito
- Cindy Marino as Wendy

== Production ==
Filming began on March 20, 2017 and ended at the end of April of the same year.

== Reception ==
It was seen by 25,000 people on its first day in theaters. The film ended its run with a total of 311,892 viewers.
