= El Abuelo (2017 film) =

- Theatrical release poster
- Directed by: Gustavo Saavedra Calle
- Written by: Gustavo Saavedra Calle
- Produced by: Claudia Barco; Marcos Camacho; Delia García; Veronica Perez Orbezo
- Starring: Carlos Julio Vega; Sebastian Rubio; Javier Valdés; Rómulo Assereto
- Cinematography: José Luis Salomón
- Music by: Nicolas Wangeman Vega
- Production company: El Directorio
- Release dates: August 2017 (Lima); 19 July 2018 (Peru); 27 July 2018 (Colombia)
- Running time: 99 minutes
- Countries: Peru; Colombia
- Language: Spanish

El Abuelo (lit. 'The Grandfather') is a 2017 road comedy-drama film written and directed by Gustavo Saavedra Calle in his directorial debut. It stars Colombian Carlos Julio Vega along with the Peruvian actors Sebastian Rubio, Javier Valdés and Rómulo Assereto.

== Synopsis ==
The Grandpa is about to turn 80. His son and grandsons begin a journey to his homeland, Huamachuco, a place he has not seen since he was 9 years old. Along the way they discover an unexpected past and the journey will become a path of no return.

== Cast ==
The actors participating in this film are:

- Carlos Julio Vega as Crisóstomo
- Sebastian Rubio as José María
- Javier Valdés as Alfonso
- Rómulo Assereto as Santiago
- Patricia Portocarrero as María Elena
- Irene Iyzaguirre as Francisca
- Gabriela Velásquez as Lucrecia
- Graciela Paola as Paola María
- Franklin Dávalos as Carlos

== Financing ==
The film won the 2012 Fiction Feature Film Project Production Contest, Feature Film Production Award from the Ministry of Culture of Peru and obtained the Ibermedia Fund in 2013 to shoot the film.

== Release ==
The film premiered in August 2017 at the 21st Lima Film Festival. The film was commercially released on 19 July 2018 in Peruvian theaters and on 27 July 2018 by Señal Colombia in Colombia.
