= No vayan!! =

- Theatrical release poster
- Directed by: Roger Asto León
- Starring: Pablo 'Melcochita' Villanueva; Miguel Barraza
- Production company: Transpacific Films
- Release date: November 23, 2023
- Running time: 100 minutes
- Country: Peru
- Language: Spanish

No vayan!! (lit. 'Don't go!!') is a 2023 Peruvian comedy film directed by Roger Asto León. It stars Pablo 'Melcochita' Villanueva and Miguel Barraza. It premiered on November 23, 2023, in Peruvian theaters.

== Synopsis ==
Two inseparable cousins dream of being millionaires and thus escape their life of poverty. To achieve their goal, they will work on different crazy jobs.
