= Rosa Chumbe =

2017 film

- Theatrical release poster
- Directed by: Jonatan Relayze
- Written by: Jonatan Relayze
- Starring: Liliana Trujillo
- Release dates: 8 August 2015 (Lima); 8 June 2017 (Peru)
- Running time: 75 minutes
- Country: Peru
- Language: Spanish

Rosa Chumbe is a 2015 Peruvian drama film written and directed by Jonatan Relayze. It was selected as the Peruvian entry for the Best Foreign Language Film at the 90th Academy Awards, but it was not nominated.

== Plot ==
A policewoman in Lima cares for her grandson after her daughter steals her mother's savings and leaves her baby behind.

== Cast ==
- Liliana Trujillo as Rosa Chumbe
- Cindy Díaz as Sheyla

== See also ==
- List of submissions to the 90th Academy Awards for Best Foreign Language Film
- List of Peruvian submissions for the Academy Award for Best Foreign Language Film
