= Cláudio Marques =

Brazilian footballer, manager, and television commentator

Personal information
- Full name: Edemir Cláudio Marques
- Date of birth: 18 February 1950 (age 76)
- Place of birth: Santos, São Paulo, Brazil
- Position: Midfielder

Senior career*
Years	Team	Apps	(Gls)
1969–1975	Coritiba		
1975–1977	Corinthians		
1978–1979	Coritiba		
1979–1980	Potosino	27	(1)

Managerial career
- 1998–2005: Sinop
- 2005–2006: Coritiba (interim)
- 2009: Sinop
- 2009: Rio Branco-PR
- 2012: Fast Clube
- * Club domestic league appearances and goals

Edemir Cláudio Marques, commonly known as Cláudio or Cláudio Marques (born 18 February 1950), is a retired football midfielder who won the Campeonato Paranaense seven times as a player with Coritiba Foot Ball Club. He is now a football manager and television commentator.

== Career ==
Born in Santos, São Paulo, Cláudio Marques playing professional football with Coritiba Foot Ball Club in 1969. He won the Campeonato Paranaense five consecutive times with Coritiba before joining Sport Club Corinthians Paulista for two seasons. He won the Campeonato Paulista with Corinthians and then returned to Coritiba where he won the Campeonato Paranense twice more. He also won the 1973 Torneio do Povo with Coritiba.

In 1979, Cláudio Marques moved to Mexico to play for Atlético Potosino.

After he retired from playing, Cláudio Marques became a football coach. He led Sinop Futebol Clube to two Campeonato Mato-Grossense titles in 1998 and 1999. He managed Rio Branco Sport Club in 2009, and was appointed manager of Fast Clube in June 2012.
