= Invisible (2017 film) =

2017 film

- Directed by: Pablo Giorgelli
- Screenplay by: Pablo Giorgelli; Ariel Rotter
- Cinematography: Diego Poleri
- Edited by: María Astrauskas
- Music by: Pedro Onetto
- Release date: 2017
- Language: Spanish

Invisible is a 2017 drama film co-written and directed by Pablo Giorgelli.

A co-production between Argentina, Germany, Brazil, France and Uruguay, the film premiered at the 61st edition of the Venice Film Festival, in the Horizons sidebar.

== Cast ==
- Mora Arenillas as Ely
- Mara Bestelli as Mother
- Diego Cremonesi as Raul
- Agustina Fernández as Lorena
- Paula Fernandez Mbarak as Gloria
- Leonel Arancibia as Toto
- Jorge Waldhorn as Veterinarian

== Reception ==
On the review aggregator website Rotten Tomatoes, 86% of 7 critics' reviews are positive.
