= Javier Ponce Gambirazio =

Peruvian writer, film director and psychologist (born 1967)

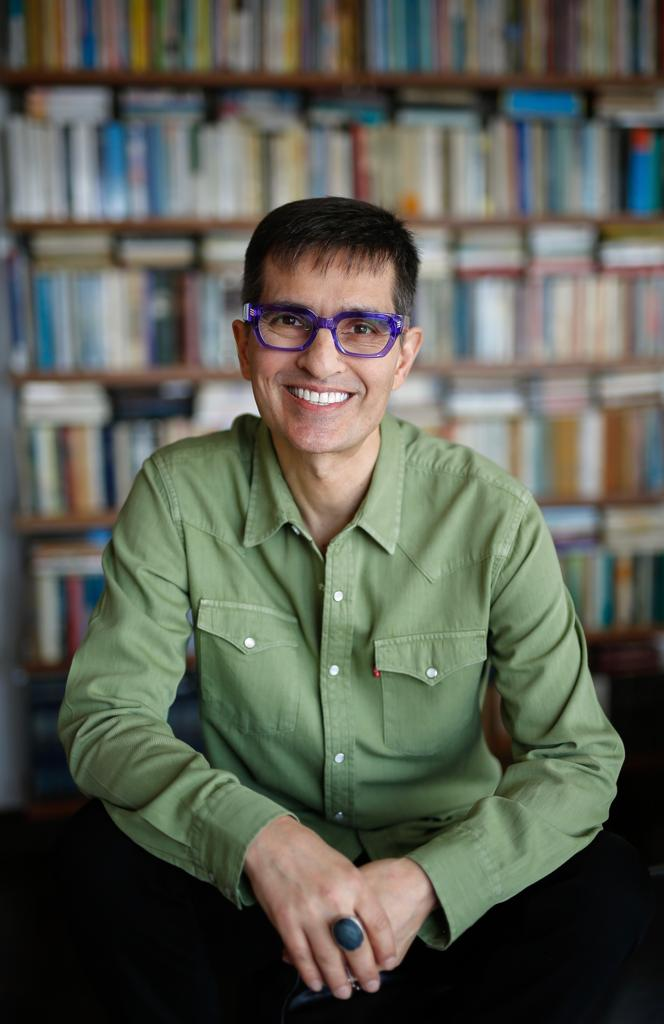
Javier Ponce Gambirazio in 2023

Javier Ponce Gambirazio (born 1967) is a Peruvian writer, film director and psychologist. His work focuses on the experiences of LGBTQ characters and he is one of the few Peruvian writers of his time to openly address trans themes. Among his best-known works is the novel El cine malo es mejor (2018).

== Career ==
During the 1980s, he recorded the experiences of elderly people about what it was like to be homosexual in the 1930s and 1950s in Peru.

His first work was the poetry book Cuatro tazas de café, published in 1994. This was followed by the short story collection La música que no escuchamos (1998) and the novel Amapola (1999).

His next novels, Un trámite difícil (2006) and Una vida distinta (2006), were published in Spain by Editorial Pre-Textos and were the first of his works to feature transgender protagonists.

In 2013 came El chico que diste por muerto (2013), a novel whose first edition was also published in Spain and which tells the story of a boy in love with his older brother, who used to rape him when they were younger. After the release of this novel, Ponce tried to publish his subsequent works in Peru, but was rejected due to the LGBTQ themes of his works and his own sexual orientation, since Ponce is openly homosexual.

Due to the refusal of Peruvian publishers to publish him, Ponce decided to create his own publishing label, Testigo 13 Ediciones, with which he published his novel El cine malo es mejor in 2018. The work, which the author described as "a terrorist attack against the dictatorship of political correctness", was a commercial success and was well received by critical opinion. The plot shows a supposed low-budget film that follows the story of a psychologist who treats five characters with personal traumas and pushes them to take revenge on all those who have hurt them.

In 2019 he published the novel Lo tenemos levantado hacia el Señor, with a similarly irreverent style to El cine malo es mejor and which follows a group of people who are filming a movie in which the Virgin Mary is portrayed by a famous transvestite named Divina Lima.

As a film director, he has directed the documentaries Lucha Reyes, carta al cielo (2009) and Sarita Colonia, la tregua moral (2016), about the aforementioned historical figures. The first of them, Lucha Reyes, was described by Ponce as "our gay icon", while of Sarita Colonia he highlighted the fact that she was rejected by the Catholic Church for "welcoming criminals, prostitutes, transvestites, and homosexuals".

On October 22, 2024, "Anastasha, treinta años de una película de culto 1994-2024" (Antonio Fortunic, Javier Ponce, Laura Batticani) was presented, a commemorative volume that tells the origin, production, and realization of the film, with photos and graphic material, and the relationships between the members of the production team. It features texts by collaborators such as: Hernán Migoya, Mario Bellatín, Francisco Lombardi, Juan Bonilla, Bárbara Panse, Diego Galdo, Giancarlo Mori, Christian Plascencia, Lucas Cornejo Pásara, Magally Alegre Henderson, Marina García Burgos, Juan Villanueva García.

== Works ==
=== Novels ===
- Amapola (1999)
- Un trámite difícil (2006)
- Una vida distinta (2006)
- El chico que diste por muerto (2013)
- El cine malo es mejor (2018)
- Lo tenemos levantado hacia el Señor (2019)

=== Others ===
- Cuatro tazas de café (1994), poetry
- La música que no escuchamos (1998), short stories
- Mátame si puedes (2022), photo-novel.
- Crónicas maricas (2023), non-fiction
- Anastasha, treinta años de una película de culto (2024), non-fiction

== Filmography ==
- Lucha Reyes, carta al cielo (2009)
- Sarita Colonia, la tregua moral (2016)
