= Pacificum, Return to the Ocean =

Pacificum, el retorno al océano
- Promotional release poster
- Directed by: Mariana Tschudi
- Written by: Héctor Gálvez; Mariana Tschudi
- Produced by: Enid Campos; Francisco Cantuarias; Micaela Egúsquiza; Henry Mitrani; Evelyn Merino Reyna; Romina Salazar; Luis Vereau
- Starring: Rodolfo Salas; José Canziani; Yuri Hooker; Belén Alcorta
- Cinematography: Mario Bassino; Mariana Tschudi
- Edited by: Antolín Prieto
- Music by: Pauchi Sasaki
- Production companies: Visart Photography; Cienciactiva; Telefonica Studios
- Distributed by: Netflix (International)
- Release dates: September 28, 2017 (Peru); June 15, 2018 (Netflix)
- Running time: 75 minutes
- Country: Peru
- Language: Spanish

Pacificum, Return to the Ocean (Spanish: Pacificum, el retorno al océano) is a 2017 Peruvian documentary film directed by Mariana Tschudi and written by Tschudi & Héctor Gálvez. It is the first documentary film for popular science cinema about the Peruvian sea, which seeks through simple and artistic language to sensitize viewers by raising awareness about our largest border: the Peruvian Pacific.

== Synopsis ==
This is a popular science documentary for cinema that reveals for the first time the secrets of the Peruvian ocean. The documentary presents the vision of four scientists and marine specialists, who decide to undertake, at the beginning of the 21st century, several trips along the Peruvian Pacific coast to teach the richness of the sea and marine species in the country. This journey shows what the relationship of respect and devotion of the ancient inhabitants of Peru with their marine environment was like and shows us the discovery of species and underwater worlds unknown until then.

== Cast ==
The documentary stars four specialists: Rodolfo Salas (paleontologist), José Canziani (architect and urban planner), Yuri Hooker (marine biologist) and Belén Alcorta (specialist in ecotourism and humpback whale watching), who seek to sensitize viewers, with simple language, so that they become aware of what Peru has.

== Release ==
Pacificum, Return to the Ocean premiered at the 2017 Lima Festival as part of the "Made in Peru" section. It was commercially released on September 28, 2017 in Peruvian theaters. It premiered internationally on June 15, 2018 on Netflix.

== Reception ==
Pacificum, Return to the Ocean attracted 21,739 viewers in its 12 weeks in Peruvian theaters.
