= Claudia Dammert =

Peruvian actress and comedian

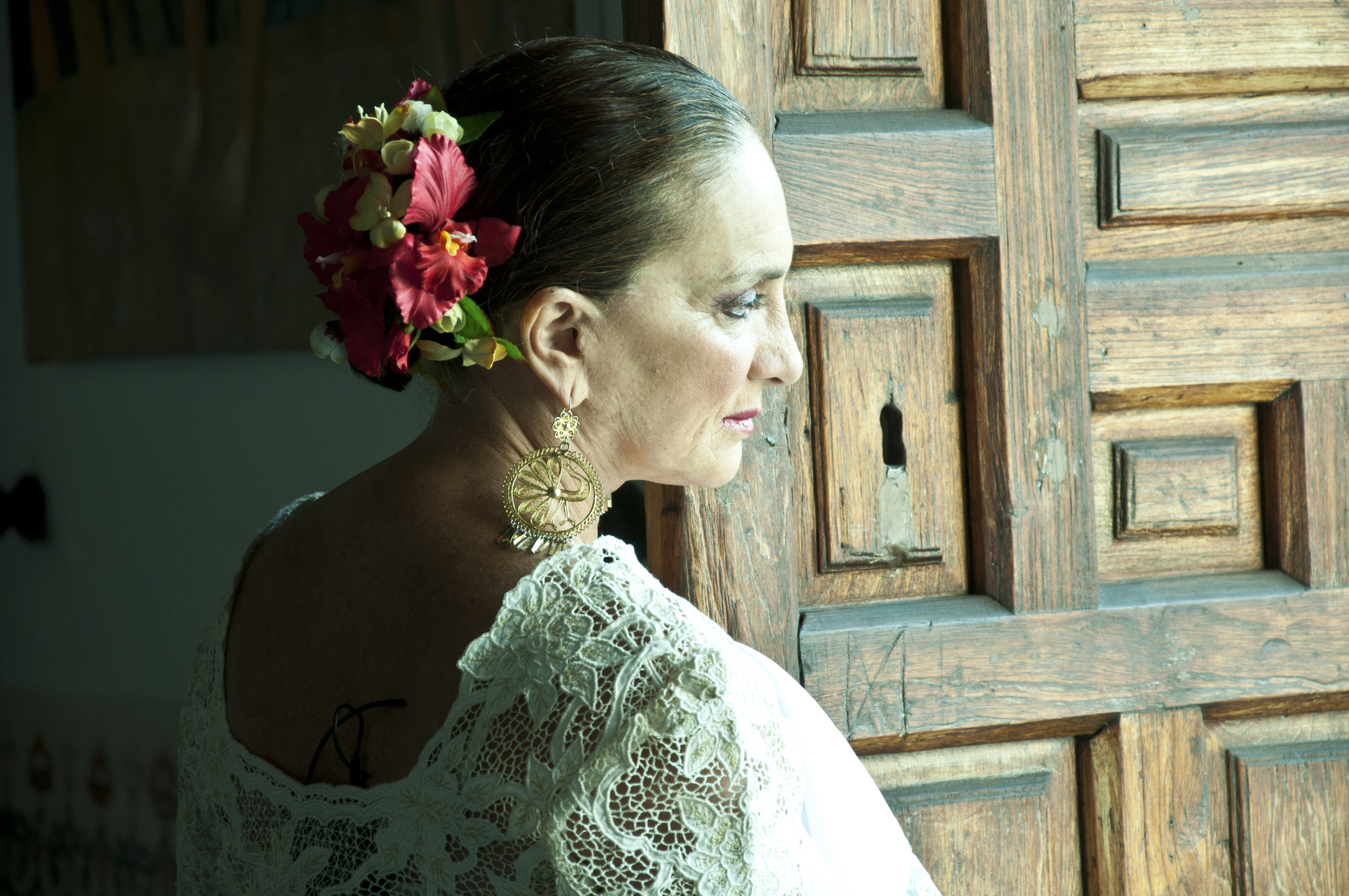
- Born: María Claudia Dammert Herrera; 17 August 1949; San Isidro District, Peru
- Died: 5 November 2017 (aged 68)
- Education: Colegio Villa María; Lindenwood University
- Occupation(s): Actress, comedian
- Spouses: Enrique Jorquera; Oscar Cicconi
- Children: 4, including Oriana Cicconi
- Awards: Luces Award (2016)

María Claudia Dammert Herrera (17 August 1949 – 5 November 2017) was a Peruvian actress and comedian.

== Biography ==
Claudia Dammert was born in San Isidro District, Lima on 17 August 1949, the daughter of María Silvia Herrera Drago and Luis Dammert Muelle. She was the great-granddaughter of Juan Luis Dammert Amsink and the philanthropist Juana Alarco de Dammert, granddaughter of Francisco Dammert Alarco, niece of politician Miguel Dammert, second niece of Eduardo Dibós Dammert, and second cousin of politician and sociologist Manuel Dammert.

She studied at Colegio Villa María, and after graduation she earned a degree in communication arts at Lindenwood University in Saint Charles, Missouri.

In the 1960s she ventured into the theater, appearing in productions in Lima, Miami, Washington, D.C., Havana, Madrid, and Caracas. She became the first woman to put on one-person shows in Peru.

During the military government of Juan Velasco Alvarado, Dammert mounted a one-woman play in which she expressed ideas against the revolution, for which she was briefly jailed.

In 1981, she appeared with Paloma San Basilio and Patxi Andión in the musical Evita, produced in Madrid.

In 2000, Dammert appeared in the high-profile film Proof of Life with Meg Ryan and Russell Crowe. That year, she participated as a political activist, opening the Four Quarters March against the Fujimori government.

After living in the Ancash mountains for ten years, supporting the strengthening of the Andean identity and worldview with intercultural radio and TV programs, she returned to the theater in 2009 with her one-woman show Más verde que nunca. In 2010, she acted in the plays August: Osage County and Cómo vivir sin un hombre y no morir en el intento.

Dammert, along with 49 other Peruvian artists, was honored for her career with the Lima Medal in a ceremony organized by the municipality in December 2010.

In 2011, she returned to television in the telenovela Lalola, and appeared in the film The Bad Intentions. She finished the year with her performance as the two mothers of Chronicle of a Death Foretold by Gabriel García Márquez, which was selected to represent Peru at the Ibero-American Theater Festival in Bogotá in March 2012.

In 2012, she presented the one-woman show Psicomedia. She reprised this the following year as Psicomedia ¡alto voltage!, with the character Patricia Pardo de Prado.

In 2016, she appeared in the play Reglas para vivir, and had her first leading film role as Marialicia in Deliciosa fruta seca. For the former, she won the Luces Award for Best Theatrical Actress.

In 2017, Claudia Dammert presented the play Tu madre, la Concho. She died from a heart attack later that year, on 5 November.

Her daughter Oriana Cicconi is an actress, radio announcer, and YouTuber.

== Filmography ==
=== Film ===
- Yo hice a Roque III (1980) as Nurse
- Proof of Life (2000) as Ginger
- Cuando el cielo es azul (2005)
- The Bad Intentions (2011)
- La herencia (2015)
- Cementerio general 2 (2015)
- Deliciosa fruta seca (2015) as Marialicia
- Sobredosis de amor (2017)
- Gemelos sin cura (2017)
- The Twelve Apostles (2022) as Herminia

=== Television ===
- La Fábrica (1972)
- Matrimonios y algo más (1983)
- Carmín (1984) as Liliana
- Rosa de invierno (1988)
- Mala mujer (1991)
- Energía todo el día, presenter
- Lalola (2011) as Gina Calori

== Theater ==
- Evita (1981) (Madrid)
- El ritual de la salamandra (1982) as Evilia (Washington, D.C.)
- Diamantes en almíbar (1984)
- Yo me bajo en la próxima, ¿y usted? (1985)
- Coser y cantar (1986) (Washington, D.C.)
- Extraño juguete (1986) as Ángela (Washington, D.C.)
- Agnes de Dios (1988)
- Brujas (1991)
- La Chunga (1996) as Chunga (Washington, D.C.)
- Gala en el Watergate (1997) (Washington, D.C.)
- Quíntuples (1998) as Dafne, Bianca, and Carlota Morrison (Washington, D.C. and Havana)
- Claudia hace historia.... Y crea histeria (1992) (Peru, Venezuela, and Cuba)
- Yo Claudia... Yo mujer
- Terapia de grupo para amargados colectivos
- Candidaza al 2000 (2000) Patricia Pardo de Prado
- Más verde que nunca (2009)
- August: Osage County (2010) as Violeta
- Cómo vivir sin un hombre y no morir en el intento (2010)
- La pequeña fiesta (2011)
- Chronicle of a Death Foretold (2011) as Plácida Linero and Pura Vicario
- Lúcido (2012) as Teté
- Psicomedia (2012) as Mani, Linda, Domi, Barbie, and Martirio
- Psicomedia ¡Alto voltaje! (2013) as Patricia Pardo de Prado
- Akaloradas (2013-2014)
- Mujeres de ceniza (2015)
- Reglas para vivir (2016) as Edith
- Atrévete a ser feliz (2016)
- Tu madre, la Concho (2017)
