= Alone (2015 Peruvian film) =

Solos
- Theatrical release poster
- Directed by: Joanna Lombardi
- Written by: Joanna Lombardi
- Produced by: Jorge Constantino; Solos; Miguel Valladares
- Starring: Diego Lombardi; Wendy Vasquez; Rodrigo Palacios; Alberto Rojas Apel
- Cinematography: Inti Briones
- Edited by: Eric Williams
- Production companies: El Arbol Azul; Tondero Producciones
- Distributed by: Tondero Producciones
- Release dates: January 2015 (Rotterdam); November 17, 2016 (Peru)
- Running time: 92 minutes
- Country: Peru
- Language: Spanish

Alone (Spanish: Solos) is a 2015 Peruvian road comedy-drama film written and directed by Joanna Lombardi. It stars Wendy Vásquez, Alberto Rojas Apel, Rodrigo Palacios & Diego Lombardi.

== Synopsis ==
Alone tells the story of a group of young people who premiere a movie in commercial theaters with complete failure. But one day they hear about itinerant cinema and it occurs to them that it may be a way of taking their beloved film to places "uncontaminated" by Hollywood cinema. With this idea they hire Beto, an Argentine who has been working for many years making open-air cinema. The trip begins with the enthusiasm of those who want to show their film and little by little it will become a reflection about the cinema, friends and loneliness.

== Cast ==
The actors participating in this film are:

- Wendy Vásquez
- Alberto Rojas Apel
- Rodrigo Palacios
- Diego Lombardi

== Release ==
Alone premiered at the end of January 2015 at the Rotterdam International Film Festival – IFFR 2015. After winning the National Competition for Feature Film Distribution Projects I-2016 organized by the Ministry of Culture for the commercial distribution of films, it premiered on November 17, 2016 in Peruvian theaters.

=== Controversy ===
After one day of the commercial release of the film in Peruvian theaters, the film was withdrawn from almost all theaters in the country. Joanna Lombardi, the director, spoke negatively about her film's situation, proclaiming that all domestic films must be shown for at least 1 full week before being pulled from theaters.
