= Elena (2012 film) =

2012 film directed by Petra Costa

- Directed by: Petra Costa
- Written by: Petra Costa, Carolina Ziskind
- Produced by: Busca Vida Filmes
- Cinematography: Janice D'Avila, Will Etchebehere, Miguel Vassy
- Edited by: Marilia Moraes, Tina Baz
- Release dates: November 2012 (Netherlands); May 10, 2013 (Brazil)
- Running time: 82 minutes
- Country: Brazil
- Language: Portuguese

Elena is a 2012 Brazilian documentary film directed by Petra Costa. It is based on the life of the actress Elena Andrade, Petra Costa's older sister.

== Synopsis ==
Elena moves to New York with the same dream her mother had: to become a movie actress. She leaves behind a childhood spent in hiding during Brazil’s military dictatorship and her teenage years amid theater plays and homemade videos. She also leaves behind Petra, her 7-year-old sister. Finding little success she returns to Brazil but is accepted into university back in New York. This time her mother and Petra go to live in New York with her. Ultimately it's a film about loss, grief and memory

== Synopsis ==
She said goodbye with a modest present: a shell. “If you ever miss me, put you ear to the shell so we can talk”, Elena tells her little sister, 13 years her junior. Petra, at just 7, would listen over and over again to that shell in the weeks to come. Months, then years, then two decades passed. Petra was already an actress and filmmaker when she returned to New York in search of Elena, where she decided to film her own loneliness and longing for her sister.

Elena is a film about the persistence of memories, the irreversibility of loss, the effects of her sister’s absence on a 7-year-old girl, emotions which Petra refers to as “inconsolable memories”. “Gradually, the pain and grievance turn to water, they dissolved into memory”, says the director, both actress and biographical character in her film.

Elena is also a film about the adventure of growing up. It is also the story of three women, which dialogues with themes such as family and maternity, pain and separation. It is also a film about Brazil in the era of the post military dictatorship, about the generation that was born in clandestine circles and grew up between 1970 and 1980, with the very real challenges of having to struggle for their dreams in times of freedom and hope.

== Production ==
The idea of making a film about her sister came about when the director, Petra Costa, was 17 and she came across one of Elena’s old diaries at home, written when she was the same age; just 13. “I had the strange feeling that I was reading my own words, as if it was my diary”, describes Petra. She had a powerful sense of identification with her sister. At that same time, reading Hamlet and the discovery of Ophelia was also a source of inspiration, as well as seeing the film Brainstorm by Laís Bodansky, which amongst other themes, is about the rite of passage from adolescence to adult life, whilst being from the adolescent boys’ point of view. The project for the film remained on standby for ten years, gradually taking form in the director’s imagination. During this time, Petra was involved in a series of other projects and she directed the award winning short film Olhos de Ressaca (Undertow Eyes), until she finally felt prepared to delve into her memories of her sister.

Petra discovered around 50 hours of home video footage filmed by her sister, of which at least 20 hours had been filmed the year that Petra was born. At 13, Elena received her first video camera. Straight away, Petra began to interview around 50 relatives and friends of Elena, gathering together a total of 200 hours of footage. When she went to New York, she took with her a telephone book with her sister’s old contacts and she set about tracking down the names, one by one, looking them up on the internet and on social networks. The feature film finally began to take form and adopt its definitive structure, when the director decided to introduce herself into the scenes, as both a character and documentary-maker. She filmed her journey and drafted her script alongside her colleague Carolina Ziskind.

As well as New York and São Paulo, several scenes from Elena were filmed in Bahia as well as Barra do Una, in the region of São Sebastião, on the coastal region of the São Paulo province. The film took two and a half years to produce, and had its premiere at the 45th Festival de Brasília, in September 2012, where Elena won prizes for best director, best art direction, best editing and best film according to the public jury, all within the documentary category.

== Cast ==
- Elena Andrade
- Li An
- Petra Costa

== Awards ==
Year	Award	Category
2012	45th Brasília National Film Festival: Best Documentary (Brazil)	Audience Award
2012	45th Brasília National Film Festival: Best Documentary (Brazil)	Best Directing
2012	45th Brasília National Film Festival: Best Documentary (Brazil)	Editing
2012	45th Brasília National Film Festival: Best Documentary (Brazil)	Production Design
2013	28th Guadalajara Film Festival (Mexico)	Special Mention
2013	9th ZagrebDox Documentary Film Festival (Croatia)	Special Mention
2013	Films de Femmes (France)	Best Documentary Feature
2013	Planete + Doc Film Festival (Poland)	CANON Cinematography Award for best Cinematography
2013	Cine Música – Festival de Cinema de Conservatória (Brazil)	Best Original Music
2013	Havana Film Festival (Cuba)	Best Documentary Feature
2013	Los Angeles Brazilian Film Festival (EUA)	Best Documentary Feature

== Credits ==
Film credits are as follows:

- Directing: Petra Costa
- Screenplay: Petra Costa, Carolina Ziskind
- Production Company: Busca Vida Filmes
- Executive Producers: Julia Bock, Daniela Santos
- Associated Producers: Felipe Duarte, Sara Dosa
- Producer in New York: Caroline Onikute
- Production coordinator: Vanessa Elias
- Producer (release): Bernardo Bath
- Executive Producer Assistant: Isadora Ferreira
- Photography: Janice D´avila, Will Etchebehere, Miguel Vassy
- Art Directors: Martha Kiss Perrone, Alonso Pafyese, Lorena Ortiz
- Film Editing: Marilia Moraes, Tina Baz
- First Editing: Idê Lacreta
- Additional Editing and Direction Assistant: Virginia Primo
- Sound Design: Olivier Goinard, Guile Martins
- Sound Mixer: Olivier Goinard
- Direct Sound: Edson Secco
- Soundtrack supervision: Fil Pinheiro
- Original soundtrack: Vitor Araújo, Fil Pinheiro, Maggie Clifford, Gustavo Ruiz
- Post-production coordinator: Laura Futuro
- Post-production assistant: Fabio de Borthole
- Editing room assistant: Andre Gustavo Requião
- Screenplay consultant: Daniela Capelato
- Screenplay doctoring: Aleksei Abib
- Casting preparation: Martha Kiss Perrone
- Editing consultant: Xavier Box
