= Wik (film) =

- Theatrical release poster
- Directed by: Rodrigo Moreno del Valle
- Written by: llary Alencastre Pinilla; Rodrigo Moreno del Valle
- Produced by: Illary Alencastre Pinilla; Eliana Illescas; Alfredo Letts; Rodrigo Moreno del Valle; Juan Manuel Olivera
- Starring: JeanPhil Arrieta; Pedro Pablo Corpancho; Piera Del Campo; Olivia Manrufo; Norma Martinez
- Cinematography: Pietro Bulgarelli; Alonso Luque
- Edited by: Humberto Barzola
- Music by: Rafo Ráez
- Production company: Arrebato Cine
- Release dates: April 2016 (BAFICI); April 20, 2017 (Peru)
- Running time: 77 minutes
- Country: Peru
- Language: Spanish

Wik, stylized as [wi:k], is a 2016 Peruvian thriller drama film directed by Rodrigo Moreno del Valle (in his directorial debut) and written by del Valle and llary Alencastre Pinilla.

== Synopsis ==
Three young people live the summer of a city that seems to be static. In their eagerness to "do something with their time" they find themselves in a situation that makes them know more about themselves and the worlds they inhabit.

== Cast ==
- JeanPhil Arrieta
- Pedro Pablo Corpancho
- Piera Del Campo
- Olivia Manrufo
- Norma Martinez

== Production ==
Much of the film was recorded in Lince, they started in April 2014 and filmed one week of each month. In total, the shoot lasted 18 days in 3 to 4 months.

== Release ==
The film had its world premiere at BAFICI in April 2016. A year later, the film had its commercial premiere in Peruvian theaters on April 20, 2017.

== Reception ==
Wik in its first and only week on the billboards it attracted 611 viewers to the theater.
