= Cine Las Americas International Film Festival =

Annual film festival in Austin, Texas, US

The Cine Las Americas International Film Festival is an annual film festival based in Austin, Texas, featuring Latine and indigenous films from the Americas and the Iberian Peninsula. Patrons of the festival are offered a wide variety of films to choose from including narrative and documentary features, short films, music videos, films made in Texas, and youth films. Discussions and networking with visiting filmmakers, parties, and resource fairs are also featured throughout the 5-day event.

Cine Las Americas, a 501(c)(3) non-profit organization, is a multicultural organization that offers cultural experiences and business opportunities for Latinos in film and media arts, and brings media arts education to minority youth in Austin. While the international film festival seeks to become an institution in the international film business and trade, fostering multi-national film production, and accessing emerging markets and diverse audiences, Cine Las Americas remains a community oriented Media Arts Center, offering diverse opportunities for culture, education and fun.

== Year-round role in local community ==
Cine Las Americas’ work continues year-round in the Austin community with various exhibitions hosted in partnership with local and international organizations. A few of their programs include CineNoche, a monthly film series with Violet Crown Cinema, CineClub México, a bilingual and international collaboration with Cineteca Nacional and Austin-based video rental shop and culture center, We Luv Video.

== Annual film festival ==
In 2023, Cine Las Americas International Film Festival completed its 25th year. The Cine Las Americas International Film festival began in 1997 as a Cuban film retrospective sponsored by the Mexic-Arte Museum in Austin, Texas. While programming the initial event, the organizers realized that although Austin was building its reputation as an important city for producing and showcasing independent film, films made by and about Latines were largely absent from the community's cultural landscape.

In 2003, the festival extended its program to include indigenous work from the Americas, as well as established competitive sections granting juried and audience awards.

== Emergencia Youth Program ==
The Emergencia Youth Film Program is a special competitive section of the film festival showcasing works by rising filmmakers from the US and abroad who are 19 years old or younger. After receiving entries from around the country, the program then previews the films, grants awards for the best work, and then produces a day of free screenings within the context of the festival.

The program emerged from a school district partnership with Austin Independent School District (AISD) and Johnston High School in East Austin, where Cine Las Americas implemented educational and mentoring programs to support the District's Dropout Prevention Campaign. During this time the organization offered the school's students hands-on bilingual opportunities in multimedia production, event production, and non-profit organization management.

== Texas film category ==
The Cine Las Americas International Film Festival features “Hecho en Tejas,” a series of films and videos shot and/or produced in Texas, to showcase the wide variety of work being produced in the state by filmmakers with varied backgrounds.

== Music Videos ==
In 2016, Cine Las Americas International Film Festival began its presentation of Videos Musicales, a competition and showcase that features selections of curated music videos.
