= Quincy Perkins =

American film director

Quincy Perkins (born July 16, 1980, in Key West, Florida) is an American director most famous for producing and directing the narrative fiction short film Swingers Anonymous which debuted at the Key West Film Festival in 2014. The film was based on a story and script by Jonathan Woods. The film screened at other film festivals in New York, LA, Miami, Vancouver, San Antonio, TX, and at the Cannes Film Festival in France and at NoirCon in Philadelphia. Other notable shorts include "Sleep Fragments" about sculptor Sunil Krishna Garg, which was created for Sculpture Key West and shown on WNET and The Tracks, which features actors Jason Day and Peter Gray Lewis.

His feature-length documentary The Little Firemen covers the story of a group of orphaned boys who save lives in the Andes Mountains of Peru.

Perkins produced and edited the feature-length documentary Underwater: Making of the Key West Nutcracker. The film won Best Florida Documentary after its world premiere on November 4, at the Fort Lauderdale International Film Festival.

Perkins graduated from Deerfield Academy in 1998.
