= London International Documentary Festival =

The London International Documentary Festival (or LIDF) is an annual documentary film festival that takes place in March and April of every year. The event is presented in association with the London Review of Books.

The festival first took place at the British Museum on 17 March 2007. The festival is subtitled 'A Conversation in Film', and claims to distinguish itself on the discussions it organises to accompany screenings. Such discussions often include intellectuals, filmmakers, journalists, politicians, and representatives from charities, NGO's, and think-tanks.

== Notable events ==
On 28 March 2009 the festival screened a retrospective of British documentary filmmaker John Samson. It was the first time his complete works were shown together.
