= Eryk Rocha =

Brazilian film director

- Born: 19 January 1978; Brasília, DF, Brazil
- Occupation: Film director
- Years active: 2002 –

Eryk Rocha (born Erik Aruak Gaítán Rocha, January 19, 1978) is a Brazilian film director, producer, editor, and cinematographer. He is the son of film director Glauber Rocha.

== Education and early career ==
He studied cinema at the San Antonio de Los Baños School in Cuba, where he produced Rocha que voa (2002)." It won best film in the É Tudo Verdade International Festival, the CineSul Festival, and the Saul Yelín Choir at the New Latin American Cinema Festival in Havana in 2002. The film also won the title of Best Masterpiece at the Rosário Festival in Argentina in 2003.

== Filmography ==
=== As director ===
- Cinema Novo (2016) documentary
- El Aula Vacía (2015) co-director with 10 others; documentary produced by Gael García Bernal
- Campo de Jogo (2014) documentary; English title Sunday Ball
- Transeunte (2010)
- Pachamama (2008)
- Quimera (2005)
- Stones in the Sky (2002) documentary

=== As writer ===
- Campo de Jogo
- Transeunte
- Pachamama
- Stones in the Sky

=== As producer ===
- Campo de Jogo
- Rocha que voa (2002)

=== As cinematographer ===
- Undertow Eyes (2009) short film
- Pachamama
