= List of Brazilian films of 2013 =

The following Brazilian films were released in 2013.

== Highest-grossing ==
These were the top ten Brazilian films in 2013. The films are ranked according to the public.

Rank	Film	Public	Box office
1	Minha Mãe é uma Peça	4,600,145	R$ 49,533,218
2	Vai que Dá Certo	2,729,340	R$ 28,990,665
3	Meu Passado Me Condena	1,985,093	R$ 21,742,484
4	Somos tão Jovens	1,715,763	R$ 18,253,649
5	Faroeste Caboclo	1,469,743	R$ 15,559,965
6	O Concurso	1,320,102	R$ 14,125,213
7	Mato Sem Cachorro	1,130,367	R$ 11,554,297
8	O Tempo e o Vento	705,092	R$ 7,656,266
9	Odeio o Dia dos Namorados	457,523	R$ 4,492,895
10	Cine Holliúdy	451,127	R$ 4,608,633

== January – March ==
Opening Month	Opening Date	Title	Director	Cast	Genre
J A N	4	Na Carne e na Alma	Alberto Salvá	Karan Machado, Raquel Maia, Luciano Moreira, Henrique Pires, Priscilla Rozenbaum, Regina Sampaio	Drama
J A N	4	Neighbouring Sounds	Kleber Mendonça Filho	Irandhir Santos, Gustavo Jahn, Maeve Jinkings	Drama
J A N	25	País do Desejo	Paulo Caldas	Fábio Assunção, Gabriel Braga Nunes, Nicolau Breyner, Germano Haiut, Maria Padilha	Drama
F E B	1	Jorge Mautner - O Filho do Holocausto	Pedro Bial, Heitor D'Alincourt	Gilberto Gil, Nélson Jacobina, Jorge Mautner, Caetano Veloso	Documentary
F E B	8	A Luz do Tom	Nelson Pereira dos Santos		Documentary
F E B	8	Tainá 3: The Origin	Rosane Svartman	Wiranu Tembé, Mayara Bentes, Guilherme Berenguer, Leon Goes, Gracindo Júnior, Nuno Leal Maia	Adventure
F E B	22	Secrets of the Tribe	José Padilha	Robert Borofdsky, Jesus Carsozo, Napoleon A. Chagnon, Marie Isabel Eguillor, Brian Ferguson	Documentary
M A R	1	Buddies	Marcelo Galvão	Ariel Goldenberg, Rita Pokk, Breno Viola, Lima Duarte, Rui Unas, Deto Montenegro	Comedy
M A R	15	Father's Chair	Luciano Moura	Wagner Moura, Lima Duarte, Mariana Lima, Brás Antunes	Drama
M A R	15	Francisco Brennand	Mariana Brennand Fortes	Francisco Brennand, Hermila Guedes	Documentary
M A R	15	Super Nada	Rubens Rewald	Marat Descartes, Renata Jesion, Cristiano Karnas, Clarissa Kiste, Jair Rodrigues	Comedy
M A R	22	Rânia	Roberta Marques	Rob Das, Graziela Felix, Mariana Lima, Nataly Rocha, Paulo José	Drama
M A R	22	Vai que Dá Certo	Mauricio Farias	Gregório Duvivier, Bruno Mazzeo, Danton Mello, Natália Lage, Fábio Porchat	Comedy
M A R	29	O Dia que Durou 21 Anos	Camilo Tavares		Documentary

== April – June ==
Opening Month	Opening Date	Title	Director	Cast	Genre
A P R	5	Rio 2096: A Story of Love and Fury	Luiz Bolognesi	Selton Mello, Camila Pitanga, Rodrigo Santoro, Bemvindo Sequeira	Animated, Drama
A P R	8	Mulheres Africanas – A Rede Invisível	Carlos Nascimbeni	Zezé Motta (Narrator), Nadine Gordimer, Graça Machel, Luísa Diogo	Documentary
A P R	12	Open Road	Márcio Garcia	Camilla Belle, Andy García, Juliette Lewis, John Savage, Michael King	Drama
A P R	19	Coração do Brasil	Daniel Solá Santiago		Documentary
A P R	19	Hoje	Tata Amaral	Denise Fraga, César Troncoso, João Baldasserini, Lorena Lobato, Cláudia Assunção, Pedro Abhull	Drama
A P R	26	Margaret Mee and the Moonflower	Malu De Martino	Patrícia Pillar (Narrator)	Documentary
A P R	26	The Silver Cliff	Karim Aïnouz	Alessandra Negrini, Camila Amado, Luisa Arraes, Milton Gonçalves, Sérgio Guizé, Thiago Martins, Otto Jr., Carla Ribas	Drama
M A Y	3	Paulo Moura - Alma Brasileira	Eduardo Escorel	Paulo Moura	Documentary
M A Y	3	Somos tão Jovens	Antônio Carlos da Fontoura	Thiago Mendonça, Sandra Corveloni, Marcos Breda, Bianca Comparato, Laila Zaid, Bruno Torres, Henrique Pires	Drama
M A Y	10	Cores	Francisco Garcia	Acauã Sol, Simone Iliescu, Pedro di Pietro	Drama
M A Y	10	Elena	Petra Costa	Elena Andrade, Li An, Petra Costa	Documentary
M A Y	30	Faroeste Caboclo	René Sampaio	Fabrício Boliveira, César Troncoso, Ísis Valverde, Antonio Calloni, Alex Sander, Marcos Paulo, Cinara Leal, Giuliano Manfredini, Felipe Abib, Rodrigo Pandolfo	Drama
M A Y	31	Réquiem para Laura Martin	Luiz Rangel, Paulo Duarte	Anselmo Vasconcellos, Claudia Alencar, Ana Paula Serpa	Drama
J U N	7	The Hyperwomen	Carlos Fausto, Leonardo Sette, Takumã Kuikuro		Documentary
J U N	7	Mundo Invisível	Various (Note: The film consists in eleven segments, each on directed by a director, with the exception of Beto Brant and Cisco Vasques who work together. The segments directors are Atom Egoyan, Brant and Vasques, Gian Vittorio Baldi, Guy Maddin, Jerzy Stuhr, Laís Bodanzky, Manoel de Oliveira, Marco Bechis, Maria de Medeiros, Theo Angelopoulos, Wim Wenders)	Various (Note: The same happens with the cast. Ricardo Trêpa, Leon Cakoff, Jerzy Stuhr, Gian Vittorio Baldi, Silvia Veitsman, Denise Fraga, Thalma de Freitas, Joan-Louis Font, Lee Thalor, Elias Fica Vontade, Gerson Silva, José Wilker, Jupiter Apple, Laura Neiva, Mauricio Paroni, Renato Paroni, Sonia Braga, and Thomas Oliveira are featured in the film.)	Drama
J U N	7	Odeio o Dia dos Namorados	Roberto Santucci	Heloísa Périssé, Daniel Boaventura, Danielle Winits, Marcelo Saback, MV Bill, Toni Tornado, Fernando Caruso, Daniele Valente	Comedy
J U N	14	A Memória que Me Contam	Lúcia Murat	Irene Ravache, Franco Nero, Simone Spoladore, Otávio Augusto, Zecarlos Machado, Miguel Thiré, Fernando Bezerra, Natália Lorda	Drama
J U N	14	Noites de Reis	Vinicius Reis	Bianca Byington, Enrique Díaz, Raquel Bonfante, Flavio Bauraqui, Luciana Bezerra	Drama
J U N	21				
J U N	21	Jards	Eryk Rocha	Jards Macalé, Adriana Calcanhotto, Luiz Melodia, Ava Rocha	Documentary
J U N	21	Minha Mãe é uma Peça	André Pellenz	Paulo Gustavo, Marieta Severo, Ingrid Guimarães, Heloísa Périssé, Fábio Porchat, Gregório Duvivier	Comedy

== July – September ==
Opening Month	Opening Date	Title	Director	Cast	Genre
J U L	5	Dossiê Jango	Paulo Henrique Fontenelle		Documentary
J U L	12	A Cidade É Uma Só?	Adirley Queirós		Documentary
J U L	19	O Concurso	Pedro Vasconcelos	Danton Mello, Fábio Porchat, Rodrigo Pandolfo, Anderson Di Rizzi	Comedy
J U L	19	Kátia	Karla Holanda		Documentary
A U G	2	Chamada a Cobrar	Anna Muylaert	Beth Dorgam, Pierre Santos, Débora Ivanov, Gabriel Lacerda	Thriller
A U G	2	Na Quadrada das Águas Perdidas	Wagner Miranda, Marcos Carvalho	Matheus Nachtergaele	Drama
A U G	2	Tabu	Miguel Gomes	Teresa Madruga, Laura Soveral, Ana Moreira	Drama
A U G	9				
A U G	9	Carreras	Salete Machado	Jackson Antunes, Talício Sirino, Diego Kozievitch	Drama
A U G	9	Cine Holliúdy	Halder Gomes	Edmilson Filho, Miriam Freeland, Roberto Bomtempo, Falcão, Marcio Greyck	Comedy
A U G	9	As Horas Vulgares	Rodrigo de Oliveira, Victor Graize	João Gabriel Vasconcellos, Romulo Braga, Higor Campagnaro, Tayana Dantas	Drama
A U G	9	O Renascimento do Parto	Eduardo Chauvet, Érica de Paula		Documentary
A U G	9	Sorria, Você Está na Barra	Izabel Jaguaribe		Documentary
A U G	9	Vendo ou Alugo	Betse de Paula	Marieta Severo, Marcos Palmeira, Nathalia Timberg, Silvia Buarque, Antonio Pitanga	Comedy
A U G	16				
A U G	16	Reaching for the Moon	Bruno Barreto	Glória Pires, Miranda Otto, Tracy Middendorf	Drama
A U G	16	Por que Você Partiu?	Eric Belhassen		Documentary
A U G	23				
A U G	23	A Alma da Gente	Helena Solberg, David Meyer		Documentary
A U G	23	Cuica de Santo Amaro	Josias Pires, Joel de Almeida		Documentary
A U G	23	Repare Bem	Maria de Medeiros		Documentary
A U G	23	La suerte en tus manos	Daniel Burman	Norma Aleandro, Jorge Drexler, Valeria Bertuccelli, Gabriel Schultz	Drama
A U G	30				
A U G	30	Boa Sorte, Meu Amor	Daniel Aragão		Drama
A U G	30	No Lugar Errado	Guto Parente, Luiz Pretti, Pedro Giogenes, Ricardo Pretti	Márcio Minervino, Micheli Santini, Rodrigo Fischer, Súlian Princivalli	Drama
A U G	30	Se Puder... Dirija!	Paulo Fontenelle	Luiz Fernando Guimarães, Lavínia Vlasak, Leandro Hassum, Barbara Paz	Comedy

== See also ==
- 2013 in Brazil
- 2013 in Brazilian television
