= List of awards and nominations received by Fernanda Montenegro =

List of Fernanda Montenegro awards
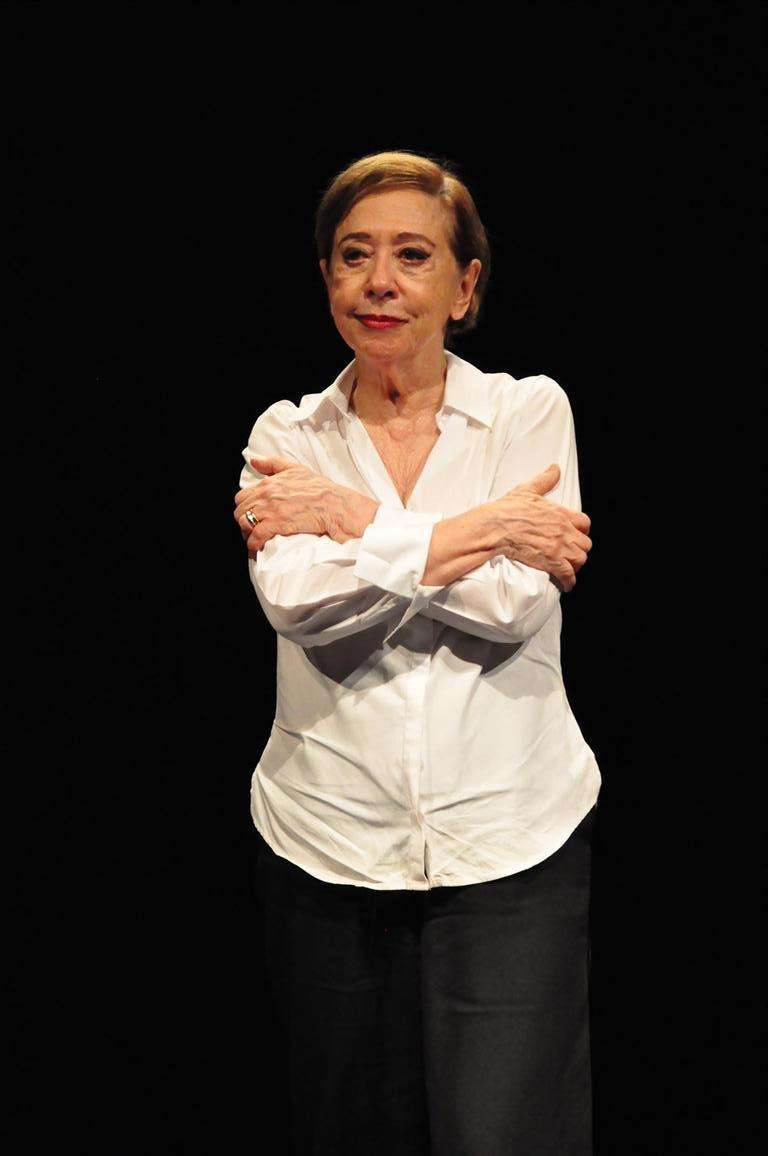
- Montenegro in 2012.
Award	Wins	Nominations
Academy Awards	0	1
Golden Globe Awards	0	1
National Board of Review	1	1
Silver Bear	1	1
Emmy Awards	1	2

This is a list of awards and nominations for Fernanda Montenegro. She was the first Latin American to be nominated for Academy Award for Best Actress in 1998 for her role in Central Station. She was also the first actress to be nominated for a Portuguese-speaking role. The performance has netted her more than two dozen prizes, including best actress awards from the National Board of Review and the Los Angeles Film Critics.

Despite her success in Central Station, Montenegro's primary interest remained the theatre. In 1999 she kept up her busy acting schedule, appearing in stage productions of plays by Anton Chekhov and Luigi Pirandello. She also continued her work on the small screen, including a turn as a manipulative stepmother in the acclaimed miniseries Today is Maria’s Day. The film The Other Side of the Street (2004), a thriller inspired by the work of director Alfred Hitchcock, featured Montenegro as a lonely woman who believes she has witnessed a murder take place across the street from her apartment building. She received a number of best actress awards for the performance, including the Tribeca Film Festival award and the Cinema Brazil Grand Prize. Montenegro again reached audiences outside her native Brazil in Love in the Time of Cholera (2007), an adaptation of Gabriel García Márquez’s 1985 novel.

In 2013, she became the first Brazilian to receive an Emmy, thanks to her renowned career in television and her prominent role in the romantic comedy Sweet Mother.

== Major awards and nominations ==
=== Academy Awards ===
Year	Nominated work	Category	Result
1999	Central Station	Best Actress	Nominated

=== Golden Globe Awards ===
Year	Nominated work	Category	Result
1999	Central Station	Best Actress in a Motion Picture – Drama	Nominated

=== Berlin International Film Festival ===
Year	Nominated work	Category	Result
1998	Central Station	Silver Bear for Best Actress	Won

=== Brazilian Film Festival of Toronto ===
Year	Nominated work	Category	Result
2012	The Lady of Estacio	Best Actress	Won

=== Brasilia Film Festival ===
Year	Nominated work	Category	Result
1965	A Falecida	Best Actress	Won

=== Moscow International Film Festival ===
Year	Nominated work	Category	Result
1970	In the Family (1971 film)	Best Actress	Won

=== Gramado Film Festival ===
Year	Nominated work	Category	Result
2011	Honorary award	Special Jury Award	Won
2014	Honorary award	Oscarito Trophy	Won

=== Guadalajara International Film Festival ===
Year	Nominated work	Category	Result
2006	The House of Sand	Best Actress	Won

=== Havana Film Festival ===
Year	Nominated work	Category	Result
1998	Central Station	Best Actress	Won

=== International Emmy Awards ===
Year	Nominated work	Category	Result
2013	Sweet Mother (film)	Best Actress	Won
2015	Sweet Mother (series)	Best Actress	Nominated

=== Los Angeles Film Critics Association ===
Year	Nominated work	Category	Result
1998	Central Station	Best Actress	Won

=== National Board of Review ===
Year	Nominated work	Category	Result
1999	Central Station	Best Actress	Won

=== San Sebastián International Film Festival ===
Year	Nominated work	Category	Result
2004	The Other Side of the Street	Special Mention	Won

=== Satellite Awards ===
Year	Nominated work	Category	Result
1999	Central Station	Best Actress – Motion Picture	Nominated

=== São Paulo Association of Art Critics ===
Year	Nominated work	Category	Result
1980	Cara a Cara	Television: Best Actress	Won
1982	Brilhante	Television: Best Actress	Won
1984	Guerra dos Sexos	Television: Best Actress	Won
1999	Central Station	Best Actress	Won
2006	Belíssima	Television: Best Actress	Won

=== Taormina Film Fest ===
Year	Nominated work	Category	Result
1980	Tudo Bem	Best Actress	Won

=== Tribeca Film Festival ===
Year	Nominated work	Category	Result
2004	The Other Side of the Street	Special Mention	Won

=== AARP Movies for Grownups Awards ===
Year	Nominated work	Category	Result
2008	Love in the Time of Cholera (film)	Best Supporting Actress	Nominated

=== Troféu Imprensa ===
Year	Nominated work	Category	Result
1969	A Muralha	Best Actress	Won
1970	Sangue do Meu Sangue	Best Actress	Nominated
1982	Brilhante	Best Actress	Won
1984	Guerra dos Sexos	Best Actress	Won
1987	Cambalacho	Best Actress	Won
1992	O Dono do Mundo	Best Actress	Won
1994	Renascer	Best Actress	Nominated
2007	Belíssima	Best Actress	Won
2011	Passione	Best Actress	Nominated
