= Brietzke =

Brietzke is a German surname. Notable people with the surname include:

- Irene Brietzke (1944–2021), Brazilian actress and theatre director
- Jürgen Brietzke (born 1959), German sailor
- Siegfried Brietzke (born 1952), German rower
