= Beira-Mar (disambiguation) =

Beira-Mar can refer to:

== Football teams ==
- S. C. Beira-Mar, a Portuguese team from Aveiro
- Beira-Mar (Ribeira Grande), a team from the city of Ribiera Grande in Cape Verde
- Beira-Mar (Tarrafal), a team from the town of Tarrafal in Cape Verde
- Beira-Mar (Maoi Island), a Cape Verdean team that plays in the Maio Island League

== Other ==
- Ogun Beira-Mar, an aspect of the deity Ogoun in Afro-Brazilian mythology
- Beira-Mar (film), a 2015 Brazilian film

== See also ==
- Beira (mythology), a Celtic goddess
