= Hard Paint =

2018 film

- Film poster
- Directed by: Marcio Reolon; Filipe Matzembacher
- Written by: Marcio Reolon; Filipe Matzembacher
- Produced by: Jéssica Luz; Filipe Matzembacher; Marcio Reolon
- Starring: Shico Menegat
- Cinematography: Glauco Firpo
- Edited by: Germano de Oliveira
- Release date: 18 February 2018 (Berlin)
- Running time: 117 minutes
- Country: Brazil
- Language: Portuguese

Hard Paint (Portuguese: Tinta bruta) is a 2018 Brazilian drama film directed by Marcio Reolon and Filipe Matzembacher. It is set in Porto Alegre and follows a young gay man called Pedro (Shico Menegat) who performs on video chat using body paint as his trademark. The film was screened at the 68th Berlin International Film Festival, winning the Teddy Award for the best LGBTQ feature film of the festival.

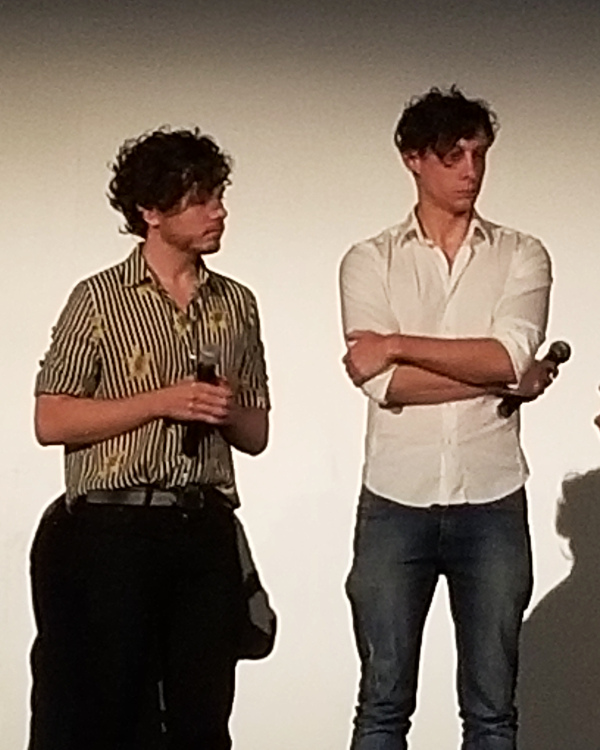
Directors Filipe Matzembacher (left) and Marcio Reolon (right)

== Plot ==
The film centres on Pedro, a shy young man who works as a performer on a gay-oriented video chat website. His trademark is to dance while smearing neon body paint over his body; the film's central conflict is set in motion when he learns that another chatroom performer (Boy25) is imitating him.

Pedro arranges to meet Boy25 (Leo) and they become lovers, but it is hard for Pedro to trust anyone. He has previously been pushed to breaking point by bullies and whilst his sister knows him well, he has to lie to his grandmother about how he makes money. His mother is dead and his father is not around. Pedro leads a double life in which he is introverted until he goes online and assumes his alternative identity NeonBoy. A real-life sexual encounter goes wrong but then despite losing Leo (who is following his dreams and moving to Europe), at the end of the film Pedro is dancing and open to new beginnings.

== Cast ==
- Shico Menegat as Pedro
- Bruno Fernandes as Leo
- Guega Peixoto as Luiza (Pedro's sister)
- Sandra Dani as Avó (Pedro's grandmother)
- Frederico Vasques as Beto

== Themes ==
Hard Paint explores the theme of isolation, since Pedro performs online from a studio in his bedroom and withdraws from the wider world. He has difficult relationships with his family and the other people he meets. This depiction of Pedro then creates a picture of a fragmented world in which people are alienated from each other. This feeling of loneliness can also be applied to the city of Porto Alegre, from which many young people move away (like Pedro's sister) leaving the people who remain with only memories.

== Critical response ==
Internationally, Hard Paint was a critical success. Variety praised the "picture of a fragmented society barely able to foster empathetic connections". Sight & Sound suggested the film was a "potential LGBTQ breakout hit" and whilst cautioning that it was a looser film than other recent crossover successes such as God's Own Country and A Fantastic Woman, called it "entertainingly unpredictable". Screen Daily enjoyed the "fluid cinematography" of Glauco Firpo saying it caught "the quasi-fairytale quality of a boy who lives on the outside of his life, looking in".

Mature Times called the film a "poignant character study". The Hollywood Reporter remarked that Hard Paint "at times recalls Moonlight, not just structurally, in its separately titled three-part breakdown, but also in its moving observation of a vulnerable gay male protagonist in an unaccommodating environment". Australian Cinematographer, the magazine of the Australian Cinematographers Society, called the film "stunning" and "beautiful".

== Accolades ==
- Hard Paint was screened in the Panorama section at the 68th Berlin International Film Festival, where it won the Teddy Award as the best LGBTQ-themed feature film of the festival. It also won the Art Cinema Award.
- Best Fiction Film, Best Actor (Shico Menegat), Best Supporting Actor (Bruno Fernandes), Best Script at Rio de Janeiro International Film Festival.
- Premio Maguey for Best Feature Film at the 2018 Guadalajara International Film Festival.
- Best International Narrative award at Outfest 2018.
- Special Mention at the 2018 Chicago International Film Festival.
- Special Mention at Kyiv International Film Festival "Molodist".
- Pink Dragon Jury Award at the 2018 Ljubljana LGBT Film Festival.
