= Coração =

Coração is the Portuguese word for "heart".

== Places ==
Brazil

- Coração de Jesus, municipality in the state of Minas Gerais
- Coração de Maria, municipality in the state of Bahia

Portugal

- Coração de Jesus (Lisbon), former civil parish (freguesia) in the municipality of Lisbon
- Coração de Jesus Basilica, Jesuit basilica in Póvoa de Varzim, Portugal

== In culture ==
- Caminhos do Coração, 2008 Brazilian telenovela
- Insensato Coração, 2011 Brazilian telenovela
- Coração de Gaúcho, 1920 Brazilian silent drama film
- Coração do Brasil, 2013 Brazilian documentary film
- Coração d'Ouro, 2015 Portuguese soap opera
