= Roberta Marques =

Roberta Marques (born June 9, 1968) in Maranguape, Ceará, is a Brazilian film director, film producer, screenwriter and visual artist best known for the series Meninas do Benfica and the feature film Rânia.

== Biography ==
Roberta Marques studied in Paris at the Société Française de Photographie (1987) and at Sorbonne Université (1991). She holds a Bachelor's degree in Audiovisual from the Gerrit Rietveld Academie (1997) and a Masters degree in Performing Arts from DAS Theater (2005) both in Amsterdam.

Roberta began her career as photographer with a brief stint as a photojournalist at the Tribuna do Ceará newspaper in 1987. In 1990 she worked as research assistant and still photographer in the documentary It's All True, based on an unfinished film by Orson Welles. In the 1990s Roberta made several experiments as a visual artist and camera woman, shooting in video, super-8 and 16mm. During this period Roberta became interested in performing arts, more precisely in contemporary dance, and made several dance films. In 1997 she made the award-winning short film Amá-la, shot in16mm with a Bolex camera and edited in the moviola. Amá-la won the jury prize at the 5th Mix Brasil Festival of Culture of Diversity and was selected to the International Film Festival Rotterdam in 1998.

In 2002 Roberta attended screenwriting workshops at Escuela Internacional de Cine y Televisión in Cuba where she began to develop the script for her feature film Rânia. In 2005 she made Travessia, a transatlantic film installation, showing her short Wake Up and her docudrama Deixa Ir (Let the Movement Travel), simultaneously in Fortaleza and Amsterdam. Deixa Ir is then selected for the main competition of the Rio Festival - Premiere Brasil 2005 and Wake Up receives awards for Best Film, Best Cinematography and Best Actor (Dic van Duin) at For Rainbow 2007. Between 2007 and 2015, Roberta Marques directed the trilogy Looking Forward, filmed in Amsterdam, New York City and Porto das Dunas (Ceará), which premiered in March 2015 at the Eye Film Institute Netherlands.

Between 2009 and 2010, Roberta works as producer, screenwriter, director and editor for her feature film Rânia which had its World Premiere at the Rio International Film Festival - Premiere Brasil in 2011 receiving award for Best Film in the New Trends section. In 2012 Rânia had its International Premiere at the International Film Festival Rotterdam in the Bright Future section and received awards for Best Film at the International Women's Film Festival, the BNB prize and Best Actress (Graziela Félix) at Cine Ceará. In 2013 Rânia and was distributed in Brazil at the cinemas and on TV at Canal Brasil.

In 2014 Roberta was selected to the Binger Film Lab in Amsterdam. In 2018 she was invited to be part of the international jury of the Festival International du Film de Femmes de Salé and develops the series Meninas do Benfica. In the first half of 2019 she makes the installation The Author's Room in Amsterdam and in August 2019 starts pre-production to film Meninas do Benfica which premiered on Canal Brasil in February 2022 and is available at Globoplay streaming platform.

== Filmography ==
- Meninas do Benfica TV series, 2022
- Looking Forward Manhattan, short fiction, 2015
- Rânia, Feature Film, 2012.
- Looking Forward – Man and Woman – short fiction, 2009.
- Looking Forward – short fiction, 2007.
- Deixa Ir – documentary feature, 2005.
- Acorda, short fiction, 2005
- Amá-la, short fiction, 1997.

== See also ==
- Mariana Lima
