= Dečki: roman iz dijaškega internata =

Novel written by France Novšak

Dečki: roman iz dijaškega internata (English: Boys: A Novel from a Boarding School) is a novel by the Slovenian author France Novšak. It was the first gay-themed novel in Slovene. Novšak published its parts in 1937, at the age of 21, in the literary magazine Ljubljanski zvon. The first book edition appeared the next year. The movie Boys, based on the novel, was shot by Stanko Jost in 1976.

== Plot ==
The eponymous boys of the novel, Zdenko Castelli (14) from Serbia and Nani Papali (17) from Slovenia, meet at St. Mary's Institute, a Catholic boarding school in Zagreb, Croatia, where Zdenko is the subject of great admiration, with students as well as educators generally regarding him as the most beautiful boy. Despite the differences in their backgrounds, the boys’ relationship becomes very intimate very quickly.

They spend Christmas holidays with Zdenko's mother and sister Vlasta in Škofja Loka, Slovenia. Having kissed Vlasta, Nani gets to the conclusion that his relationship with Zdenko is just a consequence of the unnatural boarding-school environment. Zdenko can't accept this as the truth. While talking about their relationship, they are caught by the headmaster who prohibits them from socialising with each other. After some months of depression, Zdenko decides to suppress his feelings towards Nani. Nani is happy about it, but they find it hard to forget what has happened between them, and they are again caught together by the headmaster, who excludes Nani from the school just before the end of the school year. Nani and Zdenko meet again in Bohinj, Slovenia, to spend the summer holiday together. During the holiday, Nani writes down his memories of his relationship with Zdenko. When the new school year begins, they only rarely see each other and finally lose contact. Nani starts a relationship with a girl but gets ill and dies soon afterwards.

== Main theme ==
The main theme of the novel is the awakening of adolescent bodies in a Catholic boarding school, which suppresses the erotic development of students on the one hand and abuses boys in a barely disguised way on the other. The awakening of the boys' eroticism culminates in the almost iconic bathroom scene, where Nani and Zdenko admire each other's naked bodies, stopping just short of sex. Yet, what words can they use to describe 'these things' and how can they describe what they feel? When Novšak's boys fall in love with other boys, they perceive them and their bodies with reference to heteronormativity, thus trying to make their admiration of the same sex socially acceptable. For instance, when Nani kisses Zdenko, he compares his lips to girls’ lips and believes that outside the institution his life could/should be heterosexual without any reference to the ‘passing phase’ of homoerotic attachments. Nani and Zdenko are acutely aware that ‘these things’ are prohibited and they find themselves at the inevitable crossroads: should they accept external morals or clutch to their personal ones, risking conflicts with the environment? After the very intense and life-changing school year they eventually surrender to external pressures and decide to go separate ways. But not before spending the last summer together, in which Nani writes down his memories of the year – the novel that we have just read.

== Editions ==
There have been three book editions so far: the novel was published by Satura in 1938, by Mladinska knjiga in 1970 and by Škuc in 2016.

== Reception ==
The first magazine and book editions caused controversy, especially among Catholic and conservative critics. The novel was nearly forgotten after World War II, in the time of socialist Yugoslavia. At the most, literary criticism mentioned it as a novel about the harmfulness of single-gender Catholic educational institutions, which caused homosexual practices. The criticism of Catholic education was, actually, homophobic and homosexuality was perceived as an unwanted passing phase.

In the last decades, the novel has often been mentioned as the first Slovenian novel with the homoerotic theme by literary critics, but not many in-depth analyses have been done. One of them is given by Andrej Zavrl, who points out that the novel didn't go beyond a traditional portrayal of homosexuality, which demands ending with death or with a heterosexual relationship for gay characters. However, there are some traces of a more affirmative approach to the depiction of homosexuality in Novšak's novel and, according to Zavrl, Novšak does not subscribe wholeheartedly to the concept of the passing phase. Rather, he tacitly deconstructs it. There is no clear-cut line or unproblematic transition between homo- and heteroeroticism. They are both present simultaneously: heteronormativity constantly intervenes in the boys' homoerotic relationships, just as the seemingly heteroerotic life is profoundly shaped by strong reminiscences of homoeroticism. Furthermore, Novšak provides a distinctly unhappy ending. Nani dies at the end of the novel, so he can't live his life as a heterosexual man, which was his firm decision. Zdenko's end is more open but one of the possibilities is that he later commits suicide. France Novšak's Boys, thus, seem to imply that for many people homosexuality is not just a phase and heterosexual life is not a solution for them.

== Film adaptation ==
The movie Boys was made by Stanko Jost in 1977. However, there were just two screenings of the movie in that year. The next one was held at the Ljubljana LGBT Film Festival in 2004.

The erotic moments between the boys in the movie are quite explicit. The original Catholic boarding school in the 1930s in Zagreb is replaced with a secular public boarding school in socialist Slovenia. Besides, the ending is more open, and the heterosexualization of the main characters is not as evident as in the book.
