= Marcio Reolon =

Brazilian film director

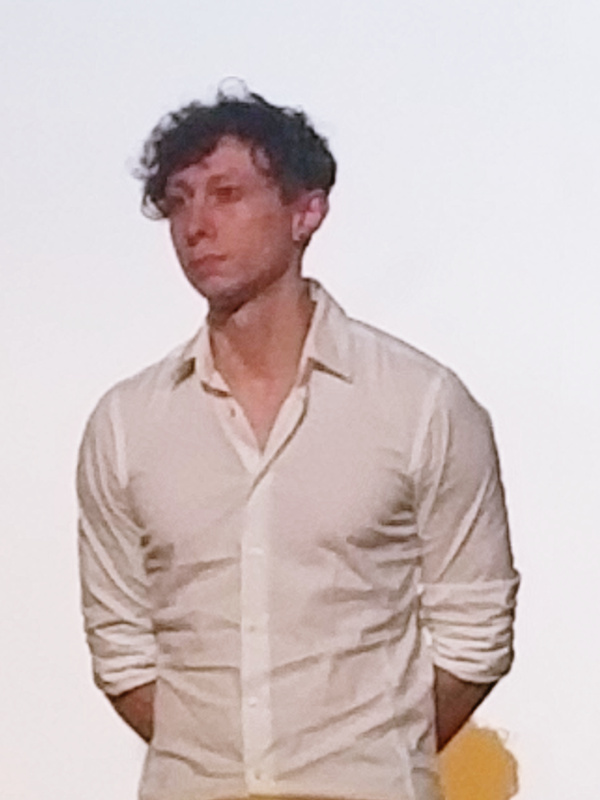
- Marcio Reolon in 2018
- Born: November 16, 1984 (age 41); Rio Grande do Sul, Brazil
- Occupations: Actor, Director, Screenwriter

Marcio Reolon (born on November 16, 1984 in Rio Grande do Sul) is a Brazilian film director, screenwriter, producer and actor.

== Career ==
His first feature film Seashore premiered worldwide at the Forum section of the Berlin International Film Festival in 2015. In Brazil the film premiered at the Rio International Film Festival, where it was the winner of the Best Film award at the Novos Rumos section and the Félix Jury Special Award.

In 2018, his second feature film Hard Paint premiered at the Panorama section of the 2018 Berlin Film Festival, winning the Teddy Award for Best Film, as well as the International Confederation of Art Cinemas award for Best Film of the Panorama section. In Brazil, Hard Paint was the main winner at the Rio International Film Festival, with the awards for Best Film, Best Screenplay, Best Actor and Best Supporting Actor. Hard Paint was screened at over 100 film festivals around the world, winning over 30 awards, and was on several lists of best films of 2018, and best film of the decade.

He often co-writes and directs his films with Filipe Matzembacher and also a founding member of Avante Filmes.

== Filmography ==
=== Director ===
- Night Stage, (2025)
- Hard Paint, 2018 (co-directed with Filipe Matzembacher)
- The Nest, 2016 (co-directed with Filipe Matzembacher)
- The Last Day Before Zanzibar, 2016 (co-directed with Filipe Matzembacher)
- Seashore, 2015
- A Ballet Dialogue, 2012

=== Actor ===
- Nico, 2011
- Empty Room, 2013
- Pele De Concreto, 2014
- The Last Day Before Zanzibar, 2016
- Hand Paint, 2018
- Bad Honey, 2019
- After Being Ashes, 2020
- Mamantula, 2023
- Paradise Europe, 2023
- Ash Wednesday, 2023

=== Screenwriter ===
- Hand Paint, 2018
- The Last Day Before Zanzibar, 2016
- The Nest, 2016
- Seashore, 2015
- A Ballet Dialogue, 2012
