= Rânia =

2011 film directed by Roberta Marques

- Theatrical release poster
- Directed by: Roberta Marques
- Starring: Rob Das; Graziela Felix; Mariana Lima; Nataly Rocha; Paulo José
- Production companies: Acrobates Film; Latitude Sul
- Distributed by: Tucuman Filmes
- Release dates: October 14, 2011 (Festival do Rio); March 22, 2013 (Brazil)
- Running time: 85 minutes
- Country: Brazil
- Language: Portuguese

Rânia is a 2012 Brazilian drama film directed by Roberta Marques. The film premiered in the official competition of the 2012 International Film Festival Rotterdam, and was the winner of the Première Brazil - "New Paths" in the 2011 Festival do Rio.

== Plot ==
The film follows the story of Rânia, a young girl from Fortaleza, who spends the time on school, housework and working in a tent. Her biggest dream, however, is to become a dancer. With her best friend, Zizi, Rânia discovers the world of parties and orgies, and starts to make money with the nightlife. When Rânia meets the choreographer Estela, she finally have the chance to become a professional dancer, but will need to confront the intransigence of her parents.

== Cast ==
- Rob Das as Belga
- Graziela Felix as Rânia
- Mariana Lima as Estela
- Nataly Rocha as Zizi
- Paulo José
