= Ilda Santiago =

Brazilian film director and producer

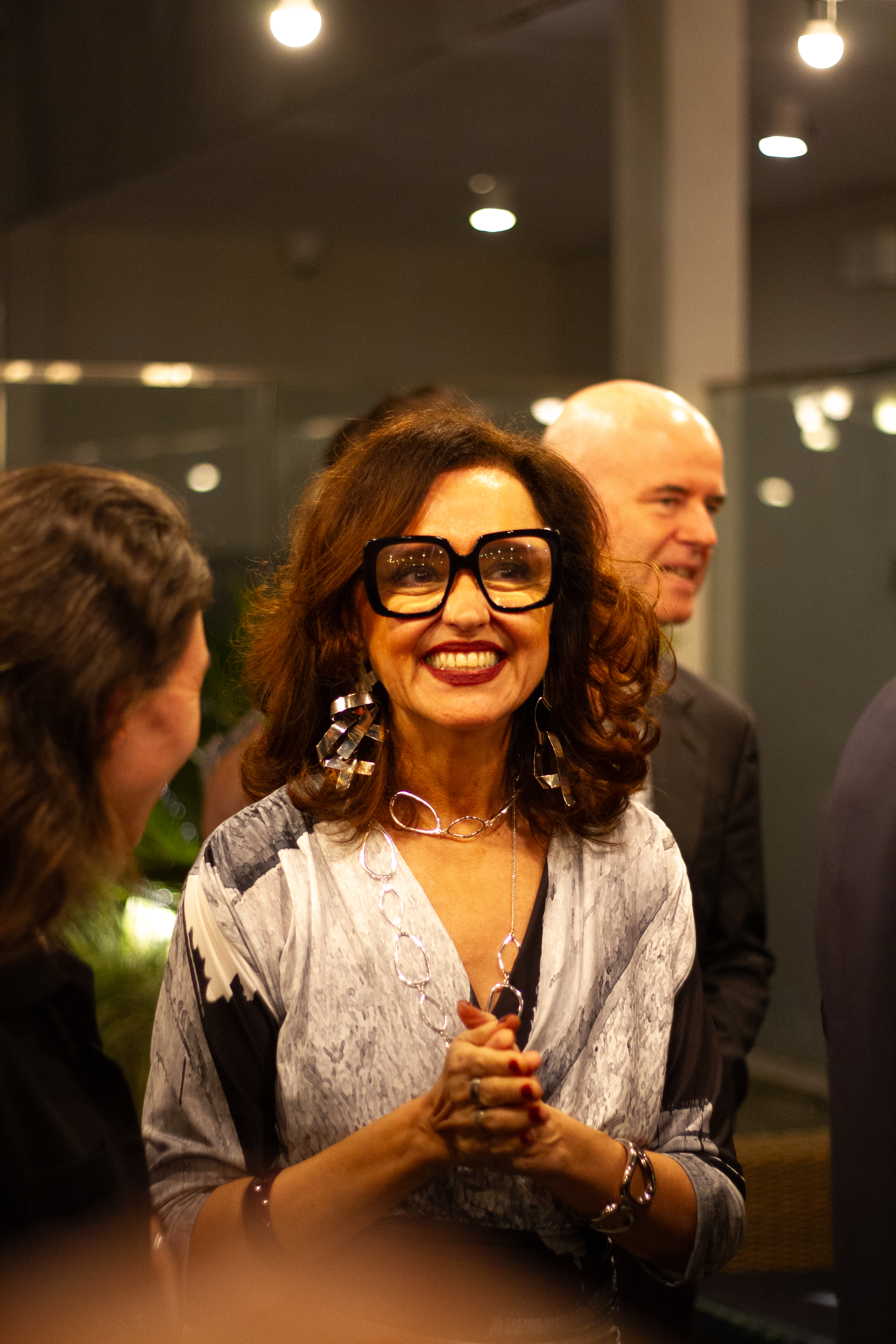
- Ilda Santiago at the 2025 Rio Film Festival.
- Born: 1966; Rio de Janeiro, Brazil
- Occupations: Festival director, programmer, distributor, producer
- Years active: 1980–present

Ilda Santiago is a Brazilian film producer and the director of the Rio Film Festival. Santiago is a co-founder and partner of the company Grupo Estação, which aims to expand access to independent cinema in Brazil. She is also a co-founder and the managing director of the international production company, Janeiro Studios. Santiago is most known for her role as executive director of the Rio Film Festival and for championing the Brazilian film industry nationally and internationally. In 2013, she also served as a juror for the Un Certain Regard section at the Cannes Film Festival.

== Career ==
In the 1980s, she became a co-founder of Grupo Estação, with the aim of expanding access to independent cinema in Brazil. The group began with a single screening room in Botafogo, Rio de Janeiro, later expanding to several theaters specializing in art-house cinema and independent productions.

Ilda Santiago became one of the founders of the Rio Film Festival in 1987. The festival promotes Brazilian and Latin American cinema. She is the long-time executive director of the festival, having served in the role for over 20 years. As director of the festival, she is one of its two principal selectors.

She is also the producer of the films, Concrete Jungle (Serva Concreta) and Vitória (Victoria).

In 2013, she was a juror for the Un Certain Regard section at the Cannes Film Festival. She also served as a foreign correspondent to the festival in 2020.

In 2024, Santiago became a co-founder and managing director of the production company, Janeiro Studios, a collaboration between companies in various countries for producing film and television series throughout Latin America.
