= Ljubljana LGBT Film Festival =

LGBTQ film festival in Slovenia

The Ljubljana LGBT Film Festival is an annual international LGBT film festival held in Ljubljana, Slovenia. It is the oldest film festival of its sort in Europe and also the oldest international film festival in Slovenia. It showcases LGBT-themed films, i.e. films with nonheterosexual and non-cisgender topics or motifs.

The festival was launched in 1984 in the capital of the Socialist Republic of Slovenia, one of the six republics forming the country of Yugoslavia.

Screenings take place around 1 December – World AIDS Day, and the festival takes about a week.

== History ==
When Slovenia was still part of the former Socialist Federal Republic of Yugoslavia, Ljubljana's Student Cultural Centre (ŠKUC) founded its gay section, called Magnus. The section organized the first edition of the festival as part of a wider festival on gay culture. It took place at several locations around Ljubljana: the ŠKUC Gallery, KinoŠkuc, The Ljubljana Faculty of Arts and Disko FV.

From then on, the festival has been held annually, with the exception of the year 1987. The fourth edition of the festival was, namely, cancelled after pressures from the state authorities due to an alleged fear of the AIDS epidemic.

The festival got limited financial resources from state and city authorities for years, so not all screenings in the history of the festival were translated into the Slovenian language. In 1996 the Slovenian Ministry of Culture banned screenings without translation into the Slovenian language, so the films of the 12th edition were translated simultaneously.

Since 1994, the main festival location has been either the Kinodvor (in years 2004 to 2008) or the Slovenska kinoteka (Slovenian Cinematheque). Since 2004, the Ljubljana LGBT Film Festival has had at least one screening location outside Ljubljana.

Since 2013, the best films of the festival are awarded prizes by the jury and by the audience. As dragon is the symbol of Ljubljana, the name of the Ljubljana LGBT Film Festival award is the Pink Dragon.

In 2018, the festival was mainly supported by the Slovenian Film Centre for the first time in its history.

The 2020 edition of the festival was held online due to the COVID-19 pandemic, and could not include festival guests.

The start of the 2023 edition of the festival was marked by an incident in Ljubljana, as a group of young people tore down a rainbow flag from above the entrance of the Kinodvor cinema and set it on fire. The attack has been condemned by several groups, as well as by the president of the state, the prime minister and the culture minister. A similar incident happened in 2025 when vandals destroyed the rainbow flag displayed on the façade of Kinodvor.

The 40th edition of the festival was inaugurated by the President of the Republic of Slovenia, Nataša Pirc Musar, who delivered a speech at Kinodvor prior to the first screening of 2024.

In recent years, the festival attracted several well-known Slovenian and foreign filmmakers, who participated in festival talks and round tables. Among them were Ljerka Belak, Nicola Bellucci, Sibylle Brunner, Diego del Rio, Marcel Gisler, Barbara Hammer, Tzeli Hadjidimitriou, Venci Kostov, Fan Popo, Kat Rohrer and Maja Weiss.

== Awards ==
2025

- Pink Dragon Jury Award for Best Feature Film: (India) Cactus Pears (Sabar Bonda) (Rohan Parashuram Kanawade)
- Pink Dragon Audience Award for Best Feature Film: (Slovenia) (North Macedonia) Fantasy (Kukla (Katarina Bogdanović))
- Pink Dragon Audience Award for Best Documentary Film: (Switzerland) Quir (Nicola Bellucci)

2024

- Pink Dragon Jury Award: (Canada) (Philippines) (United States) Asog (Seán Devlin)
- Pink Dragon Audience Award: (Austria) What a Feeling (Kat Rohrer)
- Pink Dragon Short Slovenian Film Award: (Slovakia) (Slovenia) In Between (Vmes) (Petra Hrovatin)

2023

- Pink Dragon Jury Award: (Spain) (Bulgaria) Liuben (Venci Kostov)
- Pink Dragon Audience Award: (Mexico) All the Silence (Todo el silencio) (Diego del Rio)
- Pink Dragon Short Slovenian Film Award: (Slovenia) A Worldly Woman of Indomitable Spirit (Alma, neuklonljiva ženska) (Huiqin Wang, Andrej Kamnik)

2022

- Pink Dragon Jury Award: (Brazil) Three Tidy Tigers Tied a Tie Tighter (Três Tigres Tristes) (Gustavo Vinagre)
- Pink Dragon Audience Award: (Sweden) (Belgium) (Norway) Nelly & Nadine (Magnus Gertten)
- Pink Dragon Short Slovenian Film Award: (Slovenia) Marjetica v postelji (Alen in Robi Predanič)

2021

- Pink Dragon Jury Award: (South Korea) House of Hummingbird (Beol-sae) (Kim Bora)
- Pink Dragon Audience Award: (Finland) Tove (film) (Zaida Bergroth)

2020

- Pink Dragon Audience Award: (United States) Welcome to Chechnya (David France)

2019

- Pink Dragon Jury Award: (France) (Mexico) (Switzerland) Knife + Heart (Couteau dan le coeur) (Yann Gonzalez)
- Pink Dragon Audience Award: (France) Portrait of a Lady on Fire (Portrait de la jeune fille en feu) (Céline Sciamma)

2018

- Pink Dragon Jury Award: (Brazil) Hard Paint (Tinta bruta) (Felipe Matzembacher, Marcio Reolon)
- Pink Dragon Audience Award: (United States) Freak Show (Trudie Styler)

2017

- Pink Dragon Jury Award: (France) BPM (Beats Per Minute) (120 battements par minute) (Robin Campillo)
- Pink Dragon Audience Award: (Mexico) Chavela (Catherine Gund, Daresha Kyi)
- Pink Dragon Short Slovenian Film Award: (Slovenia) Po gladini (Blaž Slana)

2016

- Pink Dragon Jury Award: (France) Paris 05:59: Théo & Hugo (Théo et Hugo dans le même bateau) (Olivier Ducastel, Jacques Martineau)
- Pink Dragon Audience Award: Transgender Life in Slovenia (Transspolna življenja v Sloveniji) (Michelle Emson)

2015

- Pink Dragon Jury Award: (India) Margarita, With a Straw (Shonali Bose)
- Pink Dragon Audience Award: (Thailand) (Hong Kong) (United States) (Singapore) How to Win at Checkers (Every Time) (Josh Kim)

2014

- Pink Dragon Jury Award: (Netherlands) Matterhorn (Diederik Ebbinge)
- Pink Dragon Audience Award: (Brazil) The Way He Looks (Hoje Eu Quero Voltar Sozinho) (Daniel Ribeiro)
- Pink Dragon Short Slovenian Film Award: (Slovenia) God's Mistake (Božja napaka) (Eva Matarranz, Anna Savchenko)

2013

- Pink Dragon Jury Award: (Japan) Yoshiko & Yuriko (Yuriko, dasuvidânya) (Sachi Hamano)
- Pink Dragon Audience Award: (Switzerland) Rosie (Marcel Gisler)
