= Elisa Volpatto =

Brazilian actress (born 1986)

- Born: Elisa Volpatto; 2 December 1986 (age 38); Nova Prata, Rio Grande do Sul, Brazil
- Occupation: Actress
- Years active: 2006–present

Elisa Volpatto (born 2 December 1986) is a Brazilian actress who played the lead role in the HBO Latin America's TV series Woman of Phases.

== Career ==
Born in Nova Prata, a city from Rio Grande do Sul, she studied Performing Arts at the Universidade Federal do Rio Grande do Sul and graduated as an actress in the Teatro Escola de Porto Alegre. Elisa Volpatto appeared in several short films, including Porto Alegre de Quintana, directed by Fabiano de Souza and Gilson Vargas. She won the Best Actress Award in 2010, in the Gramado Cinema Festival, for her role in the short movie Um Animal Menor. Elisa Volpatto played the lead role, Graça, in 2011 HBO Latin America's TV series Mulher de Fases, which was the first comedy series produced by the television network. She won the 2011 APCA awards as Best Newcomer Actress for her work in Mulher de Fases.

== Filmography ==
=== Television ===
Year	Title	Role
2006	A Ferro e Fogo	Sofia
2006	Porto Alegre de Quintana	Skeleton
2007	O Desvio	Girl
2009	4 Destinos	Antônia
2010	Mulher de Fases	Graça
2012	Doce de Mãe (film)	Carolina de Souza
2013	Latitudes	Aline
2014	Doce de Mãe (TV series)	Carolina de Souza
2020–	Good Morning, Verônica	Anita Berlinger

=== Cinema ===
Year	Title	Role
2007	Rummikub	Tereza
2008	O Rosto Que Sorri	She
2008	Um Animal Menor	Woman
2010	Menos que Nada	Ursula
2011	O Gorila	Lieutenant Danniels
2011	O Tempo e o Vento	Alice Terra
2014	Real Beleza	Model
2014	O Mercado de Notícias	Pecúnia

=== Theater ===
Year	Play	Role
2007	O Balcão	Madam Irma
2008	Sonho de Uma Noite de Verão	Helena
2008	A Megera Domada	Bianca
2009	O País de Helena	Helena
2009	Desvario	Roberta
2011	Depressões	
2011	Bruxas	Abigail Williams
2014	Brincar de Pensar	Maria-Mole

== Accolades ==
Year	Award	Category	Work	Result
2010	Comunicurta	Best Actress	Um Animal Menor	Won
2010	Prêmio Açorianos	Best Supporting Actress	Desvario	Won
2010	Festival de Gramado	Kikito Best Actress	Um Animal Menor	Won
2011	APCA	Best Newcomer Actress	Mulher de Fases	Won
2012	Monte-Carlo Television Festival	Outstanding Comedy Actress	Mulher de Fases	Nominated
