= Night Stage =

2025 erotic thriller film

- Promotional poster
- Portuguese: Ato noturno
- Directed by: Marcio Reolon; Filipe Matzembacher
- Written by: Marcio Reolon; Filipe Matzembacher
- Produced by: Jessica Luz; Paola Wink; Filipe Matzembacher; Marcio Reolon
- Starring: Gabriel Faryas; Cirillo Luna; Henrique Barreira; Ivo Müller; Kaya Rodrigues
- Cinematography: Luciana Baseggio
- Edited by: Germano de Oliveira
- Music by: Thiago Pethit; Arthur Decloedt; Charles Tixier
- Production companies: Vulcana Cinema; Avante Films
- Distributed by: Vitrine Films; M-Appeal
- Release date: 14 February 2025 (Berlinale)
- Running time: 119 minutes
- Country: Brazil
- Language: Portuguese

Night Stage (Portuguese: Ato noturno) is a 2025 Brazilian erotic thriller film directed by Marcio Reolon and Filipe Matzembacher. The film follows an actor and a politician, who start a secret affair and together discover their fetish for having sex in public places.

The film had its world premiere at the Panorama section of the 75th Berlin International Film Festival on 14 February 2025, and was also nominated for the Teddy Award.

== Cast ==
- Gabriel Faryas as Matias
- Cirillo Luna as Rafael
- Henrique Barreira as Fabio
- Ivo Müller as Camilo
- Kaya Rodrigues as Pâmela Almeida
- Larissa Sanguiné as Larissa
- Gabriela Greco as Sofia Alcântara
- Antonio Czamanski as Dr. Otávio

== Release ==
Night Stage had its World premiere in the Panorama section of the 75th Berlin International Film Festival on 14 February 2025.

In December 2024, the Berlin-based M-Appeal acquired the marketing rights of the film.

The film had its UK premiere as the Closing Night Gala of the 39th BFI Flare: London LGBTQIA+ Film Festival on 29 March 2025. On 2 October 2025, it will be presented in Altered States section of 2025 Vancouver International Film Festival.

== Accolades ==
Award	Date	Category	Recipient	Result	Ref.
Berlin International Film Festival	23 February 2025	Panorama Audience Award for Best Feature Film	Marcio Reolon and Filipe Matzembacher	Nominated	
Berlin International Film Festival	23 February 2025	Teddy Award for Best Feature Films	Marcio Reolon and Filipe Matzembacher	Nominated	
