= Super Nada =

2012 film directed by Rubens Rewald

- Directed by: Rubens Rewald
- Written by: Rubens Rewald
- Produced by: Rubens Rewald
- Starring: Marat Descartes; Renata Jesion; Cristiano Karnas; Clarissa Kiste; Jair Rodrigues; Denise Weinberg
- Cinematography: Hélcio Alemão Nagamine
- Edited by: Willem Dias
- Production companies: Confeitaria de Cinema; Santa Lucía Cine
- Distributed by: Lume Filmes
- Release dates: November 18, 2012 (Mar del Plata Film Festival); March 15, 2013
- Running time: 94 minutes
- Countries: Brazil; Mexico
- Language: Portuguese

Super Nada is a 2012 Brazilian-Mexican comedy-drama film directed by Rubens Rewald.

The film features the musician Jair Rodrigues in its cast. For his participation in the film, Jair Rodrigues received the Special Award at the Festival do Rio. The actor Marat Descartes was also praised for his work in the role of Guto, the protagonist, having received the best actor award at the Festival de Gramado.

== Plot ==
The film follows the story of Guto, an actor who lives in São Paulo and dreams to become a great actor. He prepares, practicing, and going to all auditions, believing that his big chance may come anytime. His greatest idol is Zeca, an old comedian, somewhat decadent, but that still inspires a generation. Their paths are crossed and the luck starts to change for Guto.
