= The Damned (2002 film) =

2002 film

- Directed by: Dan Svátek
- Written by: Dan Svátek
- Produced by: Pavel Melounek; David Prudký
- Starring: Jan Plouhar
- Cinematography: Tomás Sysel
- Edited by: Alois Fisárek
- Music by: Roman Holý
- Release date: 7 February 2002
- Running time: 98 minutes
- Country: Czech Republic
- Language: Czech

The Damned (Czech: Zatracení) is a 2002 Czech drama film directed by Dan Svátek. It was entered into the 24th Moscow International Film Festival.

== Cast ==
- Jan Plouhar as Patrik Lovický
- Jan Révai as Tomás Egermaier
- Isabela Bencová as Elena Dvorová
- Dana Vávrová as Michaela Holubová
- John Comer as Stephen
- Dennis Rudge as Mike
- Erdem Bileg as Rat
- Rob Das as Gert
- Michaela Kuklová as Consul Chalupská
- Borek Sípek as Consul Mazal
- Filip Rajmont as Olaf
