= Mulher de Fases =

- Genre: Comedy
- Starring: Elisa Volpatto; Antoniela Canto; Julia Assis Brasil; Mira Haar; Rodrigo Pandolfo; Giulio Lopes
- Country of origin: Brazil
- Original language: Portuguese
- No. of seasons: 1
- No. of episodes: 13

Production
- Production locations: Porto Alegre, Rio Grande do Sul
- Production companies: Casa de Cinema de Porto Alegre; HBO Latin America

Original release
- Network: HBO Brasil; HBO Latin America
- Release: 11 April – 4 July 2011

Mulher de Fases is a Brazilian comedy television series based on the book "Louca por homem" by Claudia Tajes who also written the series with Pedro Furtado and Duda Tajes. It was produced by HBO Latin America in partnership with Casa de Cinema de Porto Alegre.

== Cast ==
- Elisa Volpatto – Graça
- Antoniela Canto – Selma
- Julia Assis Brasil – Tereza
- Mira Haar – Hilda
- Rodrigo Pandolfo – Gilberto
- Giulio Lopes – major Rangel
