= Rob Das =

Dutch film director

- Born: 12 May 1969 (age 55); Delft, South Holland, Netherlands
- Occupation: Actor

Rob Das (born 12 May 1969, in Delft, Netherlands) is a Dutch film and television actor, director and writer. His movie appearances include in The Damned (2002), Baby Blue (2001), and De Zwarte Meteoor (2000). His TV appearances include in the miniseries Anne Frank: The Whole Story (2001), Fort Alpha (1996) and Vuurzee (2006). Besides, Das has also worked as the assistant director in the TV movies Gezocht: Man (2005) and Deining (2004), and served as both the writer and director for the short movie Veilig Rijen (1997).

One of the mostly known appearance of Das was as Jan Gies in the ABC miniseries Anne Frank: The Whole Story. The miniseries, which earned much fame, has been called "the best Anne Frank movie or miniseries" and it has been nominated for several Golden Globe awards, and it won an Emmy Award. Das starred alongside Ben Kingsley, Brenda Blethyn and Lili Taylor.

Recently, Rob Das has been reprising the role of Jan Gies in ANNE, a Dutch-language play based on Anne Frank's diary.

== Filmography ==
=== As actor ===
Theatre

- Beginners (2018) as Bart
- ANNE (2014 - 2016) as Jan Gies
- De donkere kamer van Damokles (2013)

Television

- Recht Voor z'n Raab (1 episode, 1993) as Peter
- Fort Alpha (1996) as Peter de Weerd
- Russen (1 episode, 2000) as Johnny Zweers
- Anne Frank: The Whole Story (2001) as Jan Gies
- Baantjer (2 episodes, 1995–2002)
- Zes Minuten (1 episode, 2004) as Bert
- Vuurzee (7 episodes, 2005–2006) as Tom
- Wijster (2008) as Wouter

Film

- Eveline (1995)
- De Fiets (1997)
- FL 19,99 (1998) as Jeroen Hofstra
- De Zwarte Meteoor (2000) as Jaap Roele
- Baby Blue (2001)
- The Damned (Zatracení) (2002) as Gert
- 15.35: spoor 1 (2003) as Gymleraar
- Rânia (2011) as Belga

=== As director ===
- Veilig Rijen (1997) (and as writer)
- Juggernaut (2003)

=== As editor ===
- Once We Get There (2015) (and scenario)
- Rafina (2011)
- Rânia (2011)

=== As assistant director ===
- Sale (2003)
- Deining (2004)
- Gezocht: Man (2005)
- Vuurzee (12 episodes, 2005–2006)
