= Seashore (film) =

2015 directed by Filipe Matzembacher, Marcio Reolon

Beira-Mar
- Film poster
- Directed by: Filipe Matzembacher; Marcio Reolon
- Produced by: Avante Filmes
- Starring: Mateus Almada; Maurício Barcellos; Irene Brietzke; Elisa Brittes; Arlyson Gomes
- Cinematography: João Gabriel de Queiroz
- Distributed by: PRO-FUN media Filmverleih; Epicentre Films; Vitrine Filmes
- Release dates: February 6, 2015 (Berlin International Film Festival); November 5, 2015
- Running time: 83 minutes
- Country: Brazil
- Language: Portuguese

Seashore (Portuguese: Beira-Mar) is a 2015 Brazilian drama film, directed by Filipe Matzembacher and Marcio Reolon, starring Mateus Almada, Maurício Barcellos, Irene Brietzke, Elisa Brittes, Maitê Felistoffa, Francisco Gick, Fernando Hart, and Danuta Zaguetto.

== Plot ==
On a trip to the coast of Southern Brazil, the friends Martin and Tomaz are united in the task that Martin has; seek documents requested by the father, which are with relatives who reside on the coast. Enclosed during the weekend in a small town in the winter, the two young men seek to reconnect their old friendship and end up making new discoveries.

== Cast ==
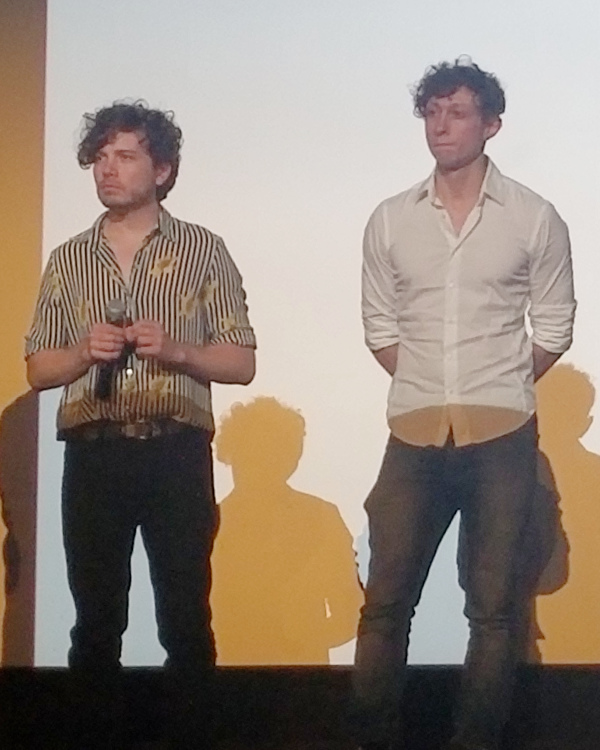
Directors Filipe Matzembacher (left) and Marcio Reolon (right)

- Mateus Almada as Martin
- Maurício Barcellos as Tomaz
- Irene Brietzke as Marisa
- Elisa Brittes as Natalia
- Maitê Felistoffa as Carol
- Francisco Gick as Maurício
- Fernando Hart as Bento
- Danuta Zaguetto as Luíza
- Luisa Moser as Rosa
- Ariel Artur as Security Guard

== Awards and nominations ==
Year	Award	Category	Result
2015	Berlin International Film Festival	Best First Feature Award	Nominated
2015	Guadalajara International Film Festival	Best Feature Film	Nominated
2015	Lisbon Gay & Lesbian Film Festival	Best Feature Film	Nominated
2015	Rio de Janeiro International Film Festival	Special Jury Prize	Won
2015	Rio de Janeiro International Film Festival	Best Film - New Trends	Won
2015	Taipei Film Festival	International New Talent Competition	Nominated
