= The Other Side of the Street =

2004 film directed by Marcos Bernstein

O Outro Lado da Rua
- Directed by: Marcos Bernstein
- Written by: Marcos Bernstein (story); Melanie Dimantas
- Produced by: Katia Machado; Marcos Bernstein
- Starring: Fernanda Montenegro; Raul Cortez; Laura Cardoso; Luiz Carlos Persy; Miguel Lunardi
- Cinematography: Toca Seabra
- Edited by: Marcelo Moraes
- Music by: Guilherme Bernstein Seixas
- Production companies: Neanderthal MB Cinema; Passaro Films
- Distributed by: Columbia TriStar Buena Vista Filmes do Brasil
- Release date: 24 May 2004 (Brazil)
- Running time: 97 minutes
- Country: United States
- Language: English
- Budget: R$ 5,200,000 (estimated)

The Other Side of the Street or O outro lado da rua (the original title in Portuguese) is a 2004 Brazilian film written and directed by Marcos Bernstein. It stars Fernanda Montenegro and Raul Cortez.

== Plot ==
Regina, a lonely and retired grandmother, defies social expectations maintaining a very active lifestyle in Rio de Janeiro's urban life. She does this largely by supplying the police with tips on criminal activities in the area. When she witnesses what she believes is a murder across the street, she tries to obtain incriminating statements from the supposed perpetrator but in the process her whole world changes...

== Cast ==
- Fernanda Montenegro... Regina Bragança
- Raul Cortez... Dr. Camargo
- Luiz Carlos Persy... Detetive Alcides
- Laura Cardoso... Catarina / Patolina
- Caio Ramos... Bruno Bragança
- Miguel Lunardi... Eduardo Bragança
- Márcio Vito... Detetive Walmir
- Eliana César... Isabel Camargo
- Milene Pizarro... Célia Camargo
- Flávio Pardal... Chapeiro in the coffee shop
- Mauro José... Doorman of Regina's building
- Fábio Lago... Doorman of Camargo's building
- Déo Garcez... Salesman

== Accolades ==
2004: Berlin International Film Festival

1. C.I.C.A.E. Award (won)

2004: Mar del Plata Film Festival

1. Best Film (Nominee)
2. Best Ibero-American Film (won)

2004: Tribeca Film Festival

1. Best Narrative Feature (Nominee)
2. Best Actress in a Narrative Feature (Fernanda Montenegro) (won)

2005: Cinema Brazil Grand Prize

1. Best Picture (Nominee)
2. Best Actress (Fernanda Montenegro) (won)
3. Best Actor (Raul Cortez) (Nominee)
4. Best Supporting Actress (Laura Cardoso) (won)
5. Best Screenplay, Original (Marcos Bernstein and Melanie Dimantas) (Nominee)
6. Best Sound (Jorge Saldanha, Waldir Xavier and Rodrigo de Noronha) (Nominee)

2005: Santa Barbara International Film Festival

1. Nueva Vision Award (Marcos Bernstein) (won)

== See also ==
- Rear Window (1954 Alfred Hitchcock film)
