= Francisco Brennand (film) =

2012 film directed by Mariana Brennand Fortes

- Directed by: Mariana Brennand Fortes
- Written by: Livia Arbex; Mariana Brennand Fortes; Rafael Lessa; Anna Clara Peltier
- Produced by: Mariana Brennand Fortes; Mauricio Andrade Ramos
- Starring: Francisco Brennand; Hermila Guedes
- Cinematography: Walter Carvalho
- Edited by: Livia Arbex
- Production company: Mariola Filmes
- Distributed by: Espaço Filmes
- Release dates: October 20, 2012 (Mostra Internacional de Cinema); March 15, 2013 (Brazil)
- Running time: 75 minutes
- Country: Brazil
- Language: Portuguese

Francisco Brennand is a 2012 Brazilian documentary film directed by Mariana Brennand Fortes, about Francisco Brennand, a plastic artist who lives and works in isolation in his workshop in a neighborhood away from Recife.

The film shows the particular universe of the artist, who at 80 years decided to break the silence to reveal the secrets of his art and his life inside his ceramic workshop.
