= Mulheres Africanas – A Rede Invisível =

2013 film directed by Carlos Nascimbeni

- Directed by: Carlos Nascimbeni
- Written by: Carlos Nascimbeni
- Starring: Zezé Motta (Narrator); Nadine Gordimer; Graça Machel; Luisa Diogo
- Production company: Cinevideo
- Release date: April 8, 2013 (Brazil)
- Country: Brazil
- Languages: English; Portuguese

Mulheres Africanas – A Rede Invisível is a 2012 Brazilian documentary film written and directed by Carlos Nascimbeni.

== Overview ==
The documentary presents an overview of the achievements and struggles of women in Africa in the last century. The film includes testimony from five women who tell their life stories: Graça Machel, human rights activist and wife of Nelson Mandela; Mama Sara Masari, businesswoman, Leymah Gbowee, winner of the Nobel Peace Prize; Luisa Diogo, former Prime Minister of Mozambique and Nadine Gordiner, winner of the Nobel Prize in Literature.
