= The Vulgar Hours =

2011 film directed by Rodrigo de Oliveira, Victor Graize

- Directed by: Rodrigo de Oliveira; Vitor Graize
- Written by: Rodrigo de Oliveira
- Starring: João Gabriel Vasconcellos; Rômulo Braga; Tayana Dantas
- Cinematography: Lucas Dolabella Barbi
- Edited by: Luiz Pretti
- Production companies: Patuléia Filmes; Pique-Bandeira Filmes
- Distributed by: Petrini Filmes
- Release date: 27 October 2011
- Running time: 114 minutes
- Country: Brazil
- Language: Portuguese
- Budget: R$ 500,000

The Vulgar Hours (Portuguese: As horas vulgares) is a 2011 Brazilian drama film directed by Rodrigo de Oliveira and Victor Graize based on the novel Reino dos Medas, by Reinaldo Santos Neves.

It was shot in black-and-white in Vitória, the capital of Espírito Santo state, in 2011. The film Regular Lovers, directed by Philippe Garrel, served as a reference. The soundtrack was composed by Fabiano Aguilar and consists mostly of jazz.

== Plot ==
Lauro (João Gabriel Vasconcellos) is a young painter taken by an existential malaise. By dawn in the city of Vitoria, he walks and find some friends to say that those are his last hours of life.

== Cast ==
- João Gabriel Vasconcellos as Lauro
- Rômulo Braga as Théo
- Tayana Dantas as Ana
- Higor Campagnaro as Fra
- Thaís Simonassi as Clara
- Sara Antunes as Júlia
- Julia Lund as Erika
- Raphael Sil as Negro
- Abner Nunes as Eric
- Murilo Abreu as Gil
