= Irene Brietzke =

Brazilian actress and theatre director (1944–2021)

- Born: Irene Beatriz de Mattos Brietzke; December 7, 1944; Porto Alegre, Rio Grande do Sul, Brazil
- Died: September 14, 2021 (aged 76); Porto Alegre, Rio Grande do Sul, Brazil
- Education: University of Denver; Federal University of Rio Grande do Sul
- Occupations: Actress, theatre director
- Years active: 1971–2015

Irene Beatriz de Mattos Brietzke (December 7, 1944 – September 14, 2021) was a Brazilian actress and theatre director.

== Life and career ==
Brietzke debuted as an actress in 1966 in the children's play "Quatro pessoas passam enquanto as lentilhas cozinham" by Stuart Walker, directed by Ivo Bender.

The following year, she began to study theater at the Center of Dramatic Art of the Federal University of Rio Grande do Sul. In the course, she participated in montages with texts by Lorca ("Dona Rosita, a solteira", 1967), Brecht and Weill ("A ópera dos três vinténs", 1969) and Ésquilo ("Agamemnon", 1971). As a job of diplomacy, she directed "A cantora careca", by Eugène Ionesco.

In 1971, she graduated in letters and theater direction from the Federal University of Rio Grande do Sul. Two years later, she completed her graduate studies in theater at the University of Denver in the United States. Back in Porto Alegre, in 1976 she became professor of theater direction and interpretation in the Department of Dramatic Art of the Federal University of Rio Grande do Sul.

== Filmography ==
- 2015: Seashore (movie).... Marisa
- 2014: Doce de mãe (series) .... Carlinda
- 2011: "Três vezes por semana (short film) .... Sílvia
- 2011: "Homens de Bem" (telefilm) .... Miranda
- 2011: "Até a vista" (short film) .... Bruja
- 2010: Antes Que o Mundo Acabe (feature film) .... Glória
- 2008-09: "Fantasias de uma dona de casa" (TV series, 8 episodes) .... Ivone
- 2007: Saneamento Básico (feature film).... pedagogue
- 2003: The Man Who Copied (feature film) ....supermarket customer
- 2003: "Miriam" (short film) .... Miriam
- 2002: "Houve uma vez dois verões" .... Inácio's mother (voice)
- 1997: "Ângelo anda sumido" (short film) .... third floor woman
- 1997: "A comédia da vida privada" (Episode: Anchietanos) .... English Teacher
- 1990: "Heimweh/Nostalgia" (feature film) ....

== As theatre director ==
- 2002: "Almas gêmeas", of Martha Medeiros
- 2000: "Rio Grande do Sul em música e dança"
- 2000: "Trem-bala", of Martha Medeiros
- 1998: "Noite Brecht", from Brecht and Weill songs
- 1996: "Biba, Dudu, Molenga e Chorona" (childlike)
- 1995: "O menino maluquinho, of Ziraldo (childlike)
- 1994: "Um homem é um homem", of Brecht
- 1986: "Parentes entre parênteses", of Flávio de Souza
- 1987: "Peer Gynt", of Henrik Ibsen
- 1988: "Mahagonny, of Brecht and Weill
- 1985: "A aurora da minha vida", of Naum Alves de Souza
- 1984: "O casamento do pequeno burguês"
- 1983: "No natal a gente vem te buscar", of Naum Alves de Souza
- 1982: "O Rei da Vela, of Oswald de Andrade
- 1981: "Happy end", of Brecht, Weill and Elisabeth Hauptmann
- 1980: "Salão grená", from Brecht and Weill songs
- 1979: "Praça de Retalhos", of Carlos Meceni (infantil)
- 1979: "Frankie, frankie, Frankenstein", based on Mary Shelley
- 1978: "O casamento do pequeno burguês", of Brecht
- 1971: "A cantora careca", of Ionesco
