= Deining =

- Municipality
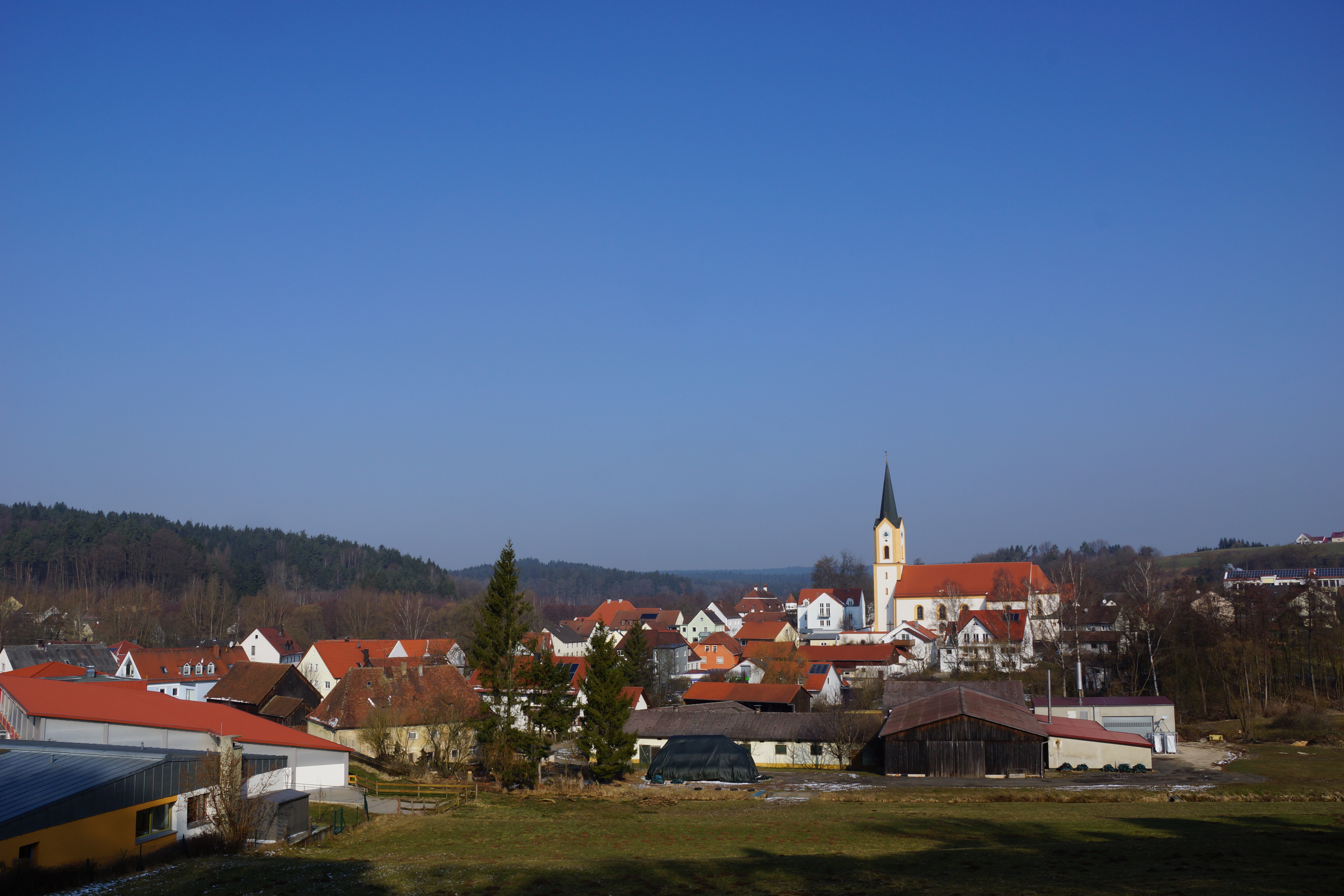
- Deining

- Coat of arms

- Location of Deining within Neumarkt in der Oberpfalz district
- Interactive map of Deining
- Location within Germany Location within Bavaria
- Coordinates: 49°13′N 11°31′E
- Country: Germany
- State: Bavaria
- Admin. region: Oberpfalz
- District: Neumarkt in der Oberpfalz
- Subdivisions: 8 Ortsteile

Government
  - Mayor (2020–26): Peter Meier (CSU)

Area
  - Total: 71.38 km^{2} (27.56 sq mi)
- Elevation: 471 m (1,545 ft)

Population (2025-12-31)
  - Total: 5,371
  - Density: 75.25/km^{2} (194.9/sq mi)
- Time zone: UTC+01:00 (CET)
  - Summer (DST): UTC+02:00 (CEST)
- Postal codes: 92364
- Dialling codes: 09184
- Vehicle registration: NM
- Website: deining.de

Deining (German pronunciation: [ˈdaɪnɪŋ]) is a municipality in the district of Neumarkt in Bavaria in Germany.
