= Doce de Mãe =

2012 television film

- Cover of the DVD release
- Written by: Jorge Furtado; Ana Luiza Azevedo; Miguel da Costa Franco
- Directed by: Ana Luiza Azevedo; Jorge Furtado
- Starring: Fernanda Montenegro; Mirna Spritzer; Mariana Lima; Marco Ricca; Matheus Nachtergaele; Daniel de Oliveira; Louise Cardoso
- Theme music composer: Maurício Nader
- Country of origin: Brazil
- Original language: Portuguese

Production
- Cinematography: Alex Senambi
- Running time: 70 minutes
- Production company: Casa de Cinema de Porto Alegre

Original release
- Network: Rede Globo
- Release: December 27, 2012 – May 8, 2014

Doce de Mãe (English: Sweet Mother) is a Brazilian television film release as a year-end special with 01 episode (season 1, 2012), and a limited series with 14 episodes (season 2, 2014) produced by Casa de Cinema de Porto Alegre and broadcast by Rede Globo on December 27, 2012. It was written and directed by Jorge Furtado and Ana Luiza Azevedo, and Fernanda Montenegro stars as Dona Picucha.

== Plot ==
Picucha (Fernanda Montenegro) may seem old-fashioned, but she has modern ideas and a great sense of humor. As the matriarch of a big family, she is involved in the daily lives of her children, grandchildren and other relatives. Undeterred by the typical problems of old age, she uses her many years of experience to solve problems in the best way possible.

Her children are becoming less and less comfortable with the fact that she still lives alone in the house at her age. However, it is Picucha herself who surprises everyone when she makes the spontaneous decision to move to a nursing home.

She revolutionizes her new home by organizing gambling and concerts. It is there that she also has an idea about how to help her unemployed son—start a business that resells the benefits normally reserved for the elderly, such as parking places and preferential customer service. However, despite her lively lifestyle there, Picucha decides to leave the home and return to her family, thereby starting a sequence of living at her children's houses.

In addition to all of these activities, this indefatigable woman still needs to address other issues such as the suspicion that her late husband had a daughter out of wedlock. She not only solves the mystery but also discovers that she feels a motherly love for the young girl.

== Cast ==
- Fernanda Montenegro as Maria Izabel "Picucha" de Souza
- Marco Ricca as Sílvio de Souza
- Louise Cardoso as Elaine de Souza
- Mariana Lima as Suzana de Souza
- Matheus Nachtergaele as Fernando de Souza
- Daniel de Oliveira as Jesus Medeiros
- Mirna Spritzer as Zaida
- Elisa Volpatto as Carolina de Souza
- Barbara Borgga as Lenir
- Sérgio Lulkin as Seu Dirceu
- Áurea Baptista as Florinha de Souza
- Evandro Soldatelli as Roberto

== Awards ==
| Year | Group | Award | Nominee | Result |
|---|---|---|---|---|
| 2013 | International Emmy Awards | Best Performance by an Actress | Fernanda Montenegro | Won |

== See also ==
- Doce de Mãe (TV series)
