= Por que Você Partiu? =

2013 film directed by Eric Belhassen

Por que você partiu?
- Theatrical release poster
- Directed by: Eric Belhassen
- Written by: Eric Belhassen
- Production companies: Boca a Boca Filmes; Teleimage
- Distributed by: Imovision
- Release dates: 3 March 2013 (MIFF); 16 August 2013 (Brazil)
- Running time: 78 minutes
- Country: Brazil
- Languages: Portuguese; French

Por que você partiu? is a 2013 Brazilian documentary film directed by Eric Belhassen.

The film follows the lives of five chefs of French cuisine who reside in Brazil, based on their family histories. With the chefs Emmanuel Bassoleil, Erick Jacquin, Laurent Suaudeau, Alain Uzan and Frédéric Monnier.
