= Mature Times =

- Type: Newspaper
- Founded: 1991
- Country: United Kingdom
- Website: www.maturetimes.co.uk

The Mature Times is a British newspaper based in North Somerset, England for those aged 50 and older. It currently has a circulation of 140,000. The paper has been published since 1991, and since 2004 under Highwood House Publishing Limited.
