= The Hyperwomen =

2012 film directed by Fausto Carlos, Leonardo Sette, and Takuma Kuikuro

- Directed by: Fausto Carlos; Leonardo Sette; Takuma Kuikuro
- Produced by: Vincent Carelli; Carlos Fausto
- Edited by: Leonardo Sette
- Production company: Video nas Aldeias
- Distributed by: Vitrine Filmes
- Release dates: January 2012 (International Film Festival Rotterdam); 17 May 2013 (Brazil)
- Running time: 80 minutes
- Country: Brazil
- Languages: Kuikuro (Karib), Portuguese

The Hyperwomen (Portuguese: As Hiper Mulheres) is a 2012 Brazilian documentary film, directed by Fausto Carlos, Leonardo Sette, and Takuma Kuikuro, about the ritual performed by the women of the Kuikuro, an indigenous community living in the Upper Xingu.
