= Doce de Mãe (TV series) =

- Genre: Comedy drama
- Created by: Ana Luiza Azevedo; Jorge Furtado
- Written by: Ana Luiza Azevedo; Janaína Fischer; Márcio Schoenardie; Miguel da Costa Franco; Jorge Furtado
- Directed by: Ana Luiza Azevedo; Olivia Guimarães; Jorge Furtado; Guel Arraes
- Starring: Fernanda Montenegro; Marco Ricca; Louise Cardoso; Matheus Nachtergaele; Mariana Lima; Daniel de Oliveira; Drica Moraes
- Opening theme: "Mamãe" by Maurício Nader
- Composer: Maurício Nader
- Country of origin: Brazil
- Original language: Portuguese
- No. of seasons: 1
- No. of episodes: 14

Production
- Executive producer: Nora Goulart
- Cinematography: Jacob Solitrenick
- Editors: Giba Assis Brasil; Alfredo Barros; Daniel Laimer; Paulo Padilha
- Running time: 27–35 minutes
- Production companies: Grupo Globo; Casa de Cinema de Porto Alegre

Original release
- Network: Rede Globo
- Release: January 30 – May 8, 2014

Doce de Mãe (English: Sweet Mother) is a Brazilian comedy-drama television series starring Fernanda Montenegro.

The series is a co-production of Globo and Casa de Cinema de Porto Alegre, an independent production company. For her performance in the role of Picucha, Fernanda Montenegro was nominated to International Emmy Award for Best Actress. In 2013, Montenegro won the Award by the same role in the special shown in 2012, which gave rise to the series of the same name.

== Plot ==
Picucha (Fernanda Montenegro) may seem old-fashioned, but she has modern ideas and a great sense of humor. As the matriarch of a big family, she is involved in the daily lives of her children, grandchildren and other relatives. Undeterred by the typical problems of old age, she uses her many years of experience to solve problems in the best way possible.

Her children are becoming less and less comfortable with the fact that she still lives alone in the house at her age. However, it is Picucha herself who surprises everyone when she makes the spontaneous decision to move to a nursing home.

She revolutionizes her new home by organizing gambling and concerts. It is there that she also has an idea about how to help her unemployed son—start a business that resells the benefits normally reserved for the elderly, such as parking places and preferential customer service. However, despite her lively lifestyle there, Picucha decides to leave the home and return to her family, thereby starting a sequence of living at her children's houses.

In addition to all of these activities, this indefatigable woman still needs to address other issues such as the suspicion that her late husband had a daughter out of wedlock. She not only solves the mystery but also discovers that she feels a motherly love for the young girl.

== Cast ==
=== Main ===
- Fernanda Montenegro as Maria Izabel "Picucha" de Souza
- Marco Ricca as Silvio de Souza
- Louise Cardoso as Elaine de Souza
- Matheus Nachtergaele as Fernando de Souza
- Mariana Lima as Suzana de Souza
- Daniel de Oliveira as Jesus Medeiros
- Drica Moraes as Rosalinda Bauer

=== Recurring ===
- Francisco Cuoco as Toninho and Fortunato
- Otávio Augusto as Júlio
- Emiliano Queiroz as Alfredinho
- Elisa Volpatto as Carolina
- Letícia Sampaio as Isaurinha
- Áurea Baptista as Florinha
- Camilla Amado as Dora
- Tarcísio Filho as Alberto
- Irene Brietzke as Carlinda
- Wandi Doratiotto as Flávio
- Evandro Soldatelli as Roberto

=== Guest ===
- Sophie Charlotte as Ritinha
- Lázaro Ramos as Francis Farme
- Augusto Madeira as Gilberto
- Sérgio Mamberti as Chatonildo
- Armando Babaioff as Artur

== Awards ==
Year	Group	Award	Nominee	Result
2015	International Emmy Awards	Best Performance by an Actress	Fernanda Montenegro	Nominated
2015	International Emmy Awards	Best Comedy Series	Doce de Mãe	Won

== See too ==
- Doce de Mãe (TV movie)
