= Réquiem para Laura Martin =

2011 film directed by Luiz Rangel, Paulo Duarte

- Directed by: Luiz Rangel; Paulo Duarte
- Written by: Paulo Duarte
- Starring: Anselmo Vasconcellos; Claudia Alencar; Ana Paula Serpa
- Edited by: Paulo Duarte
- Music by: Paulo Duarte
- Production company: FM Produções
- Release dates: August 12, 2011 (Gramado Film Festival); May 31, 2013 (Brazil)
- Country: Brazil
- Language: Portuguese

Réquiem para Laura Martin is a 2011 Brazilian drama film directed by Luiz Rangel and Paulo Duarte, starring Anselmo Vasconcelos, Claudia Alencar and Ana Paula Serpa.

The film premiered at the 39th edition of the Gramado Film Festival, winning the awards for best direction and best actress, for Claudia Alencar, at the Festcine Petrópolis. It was nominated for three categories at the Madrid International Film Festival, including the categories of best film, best foreign film and best song, composed by Paulo Duarte, Claudio Girardi and Marconi de Morais.

== Plot ==
A famous conductor divides his obsession for music with the sickly love for his muse Laura Martin. A strange love triangle is formed between the conductor, Laura and Rachel, the wife of the conductor, who ends up accepting the situation to not lose her husband.

== Cast ==
- Anselmo Vasconcellos as The conductor
- Claudia Alencar as Raquel
- Ana Paula Serpa as Laura Martin
- Carlo Mossy as Dr. Guilherme
- José Fernando Muniz as Jonas
- Luciano Szafir as Giulliano
