= Coração do Brasil =

2013 documentary directed by Daniel Solá Santiago

- Directed by: Daniel Solá Santiago
- Written by: Ricardo Dias
- Distributed by: Pandora Filmes
- Release date: April 19, 2013 (Brazil)
- Running time: 86 minutes
- Country: Brazil
- Language: Portuguese

Coração do Brasil (in English, literally The heart of Brazil) is a 2013 Brazilian documentary film directed by Daniel Solá Santiago and released on April 19, 2013.

The film takes place fifty years after the shipment of the Villas-Bôas brothers to demarcate the geographical center of Brazil, three participants of this journey retake the same path, revisiting villages, reuniting characters and noting the dramatic evolution of Indigenous status over the years.
