= Mariana Lima =

Brazilian actress

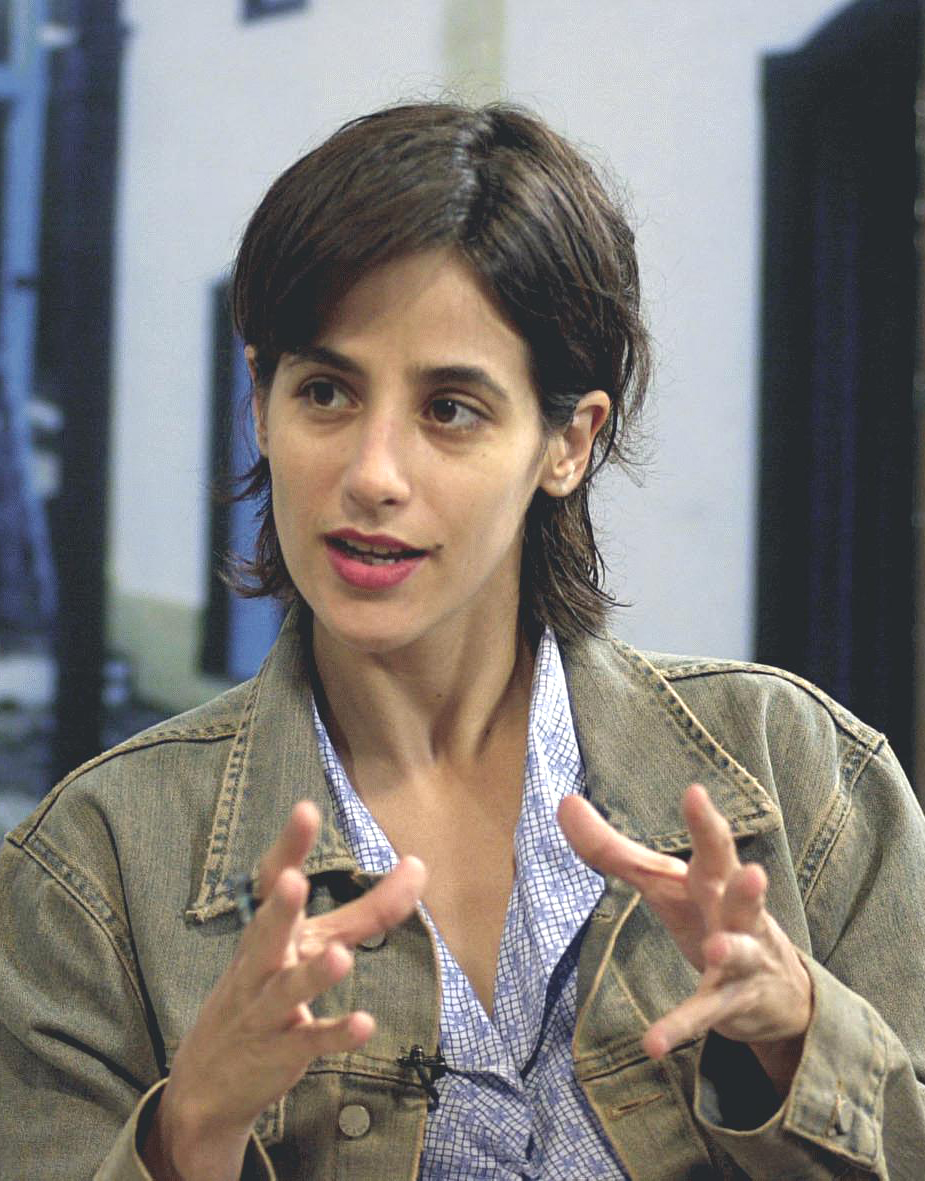
- Lima in 2003
- Born: Mariana Gomes Ferreira Lima; August 25, 1972 (age 53); São Paulo, Brazil
- Occupations: Actress, producer
- Years active: 1991–present
- Spouse: Enrique Díaz (m. 1997)
- Children: 2

Mariana Gomes Ferreira Lima-Díaz (born August 25, 1972) is a Brazilian actress and producer.

== Personal life ==
Since 1997, she has been married to director Enrique Díaz, with whom she has two daughters, Elena and Antônia.

== Filmography ==
=== Television ===
Year	Title	Role	Notes
1996	O Rei do Gado	Liliana Caxias	
1998	Mulher		Participation
1998	Serras Azuis	Branca Bela	
2002	Desejos de Mulher	Antônia Donaggio	
2003	Os Normais	Bia	Episode: "Até Que Enfim Profundos"
2006	Filhos do Carnaval	Ana Cristina	
2006	Pé na Jaca	JJ	Participation
2010	Diversão.com	Luciana	Special End of Year
2011	Cordel Encantado	Queen Helena	
2012	O Brado Retumbante	Fernanda Dummont	
2012	Doce de Mãe	Susana de Souza	Special End of Year
2012	Sessão de Terapia	Ana	Seasons 1–2
2014	Doce de Mãe	Susana de Souza	
2014	O Rebu	Roberta Camargo	
2015	Sete Vidas	Isabel Barreto	
2016	Magnifica 70	Marina Boaventura	Season 2
2016	Lúcia McCartney	Eleonor	
2017	Os Dias Eram Assim	Natália Andrade	
2017	Cidade Proibida	Laura Fernandes	Episode: "Caso Laura"
2018	Assédio	Glória	
2021	Onde Está Meu Coração	Sofia Vergueiro	
2021	Um Lugar ao Sol	Ilana	
2024	No Rancho Fundo	Salete Maria Pietrelcina da Consolação	

=== Films ===
Year	Title	Role	Notes
1995	Sábado	Art Producer	
1996	Caligrama		Short film
1998	Kenoma	Tira	
2002	Lara	Dora	
2004	Olga	Lígia Prestes	
2004	Bendito Fruto	Fernanda/Luciana	
2006	Árido Movie	Vera	
2009	Rua dos Bobos		
2010	Outras Pessoas		Short film
2010	A Alegria	Joana	
2010	Eu e Meu Guarda-Chuva	mother of Eugênio	
2010	A Suprema Felicidade	Sofia	
2011	Amor?	Claudia	
2011	Rânia	Estela	
2012	Sudoeste	Luzia	
2013	Father's Chair	Branca	
2014	Boa Sorte	Woman without supermarket	
2016	Amor em Sampa	Tutti	
2017	O Banquete		
2017	A Noite da Melhor Idade		
2017	Real – O Plano Por Trás da História	Denise	
2017	Antes Que Eu Me Esqueça	Maria Pia	
2017	Simonal	Laura Figueiredo	

=== Theater ===
Year	Title
1991	Comala
1992	O Amor de Dom Perlimplim com Belisa em seu Jardim
1994	Futebol
1995	Livro de Jó
1998	Tio Vãnia
2000	Apocalipse 1.11
2001	Raiz Quadrada de Menos Um
2002	A Paixão Segundo G.H.
2006	A Gaivota
2006	Tudo Sobre Mulheres
2009	A Mulher Que Matou os Peixes e Outros Bichos
2011	Piterodátilos
2012	À Primeira Vista
2015	Nômades
2016	Os Realistas
