= Rio de Janeiro International Film Festival =

Brazilian Film Festival

Festival do Rio
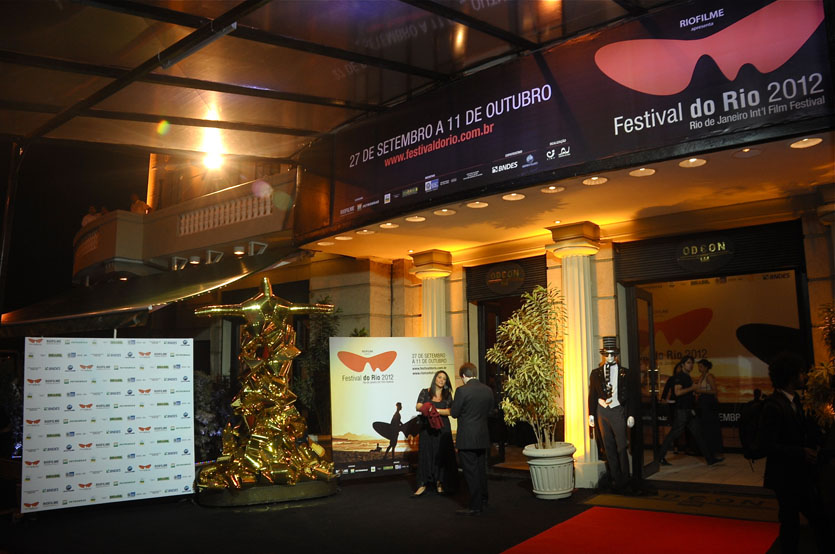
- Location: Rio de Janeiro, Brazil
- Founded: 1999 (as International Film Festival)
- Awards: Redentor Trophy
- Artistic director: Ilda Santiago
- Website: www.festivaldorio.com.br

Current: 2026
- 2025

The Festival do Rio (Portuguese: Rio de Janeiro International Film Festival) is an international film festival in Rio de Janeiro. Founded in 1999, the festival is one of the largest film event in Latin America and one of the main meeting points for professionals in the Brazilian audiovisual industry.

Since its founding, the event has featured not only Brazilian productions but also films from all over the world. The festival’s trophy and ultimate symbol, as well as a symbol of the city itself, is the Redentor Trophy (Troféu Redentor).

== History ==
Festival do Rio was founded in 1999 as the result of the merger of two earlier film festivals: the Rio Cine Festival, founded in 1984, and the Mostra Banco Nacional de Cinema, founded in 1988. In its first edition, held between September 16 and 30, the festival featured a program of more than 400 titles, including premieres by Brazilian filmmakers such as Carlos Reichenbach, Eduardo Coutinho, and Walter Salles, alongside a wide range of international works.

In the 2007 edition, the festival achieved the historic milestone of screening more than 300 previously unreleased films, both Brazilian and international, from 60 countries, including award-winning titles from major festivals such as Cannes, Sundance, and Venice, as well as from the Academy Awards.

In 2020, due to the COVID-19 pandemic, the festival’s 21st edition was postponed to the following year. The 2021 edition was broadcast on the Telecine network between July 17 and 30, 2021, via streaming and on the Telecine Cult TV channel. Subsequently, free festival screenings were announced on digital platforms and through an in-person extension at Estação Net Botafogo. The full selection of the 2021 edition was presented from December 9 to 19, 2021, also in a hybrid format, both in-person and virtual. In December of the same year, it was announced that the festival’s business market, RioMarket, would be held virtually for the first time.

== Sections ==
- Brazilian Premiere (Première Brasil): An official jury awards the Redentor Trophy for the Best Picture to the best Brazilian production in the section. The prize is awarded alongside 10 other categories, including Best Director, Best Actress, and Best Actor.
- Opening and Closing Galas (Galas de Abertura e Encerramento): Brazilian (or LATAM) premieres of acclaimed films.
- Expectations (Expectativa): First or second features from upcoming filmmakers
- World Panorama (Panorama Mundial): Brazilian (or LATAM) premieres of new films from renowned filmmakers.
- Unique Itineraries (Itinerários Únicos): Documentaries about personalities and renowned voices.
- The State of Things (O Estado das Coisas): Current affairs documentaries about contemporary society.
- Latin Premiere (Première Latina): Local premiere of new films from Latin filmmakers.
- Classics (Clássicos e Cults): Restored, celebrated, or undiscovered classic films.
- Midnight Movies: Horror and thriller films

== Winners ==
=== Redentor Trophy for the Best Picture ===
Year	English title	Original title	Director
1999	You Are What You Were Born For	A Pessoa é para o que Nasce	Roberto Berliner
2000	Tainá: An Adventure in the Amazon	Tainá - Uma Aventura na Amazônia	Tânia Lamarca and Sérgio Bloch
2001	Bellini and the Sphinx	Bellini e a Esfinge	Roberto Santucci
2002	Que sera, sera	Seja o que Deus Quiser!	Murilo Salles
2003	The Storytellers	Narradores de Javé	Eliane Caffé
2004	Up Against Them All	Contra Todos	Roberto Moreira
2005	Lower City	Cidade Baixa	Sérgio Machado
2006	Suely in the Sky	O Céu de Suely	Karim Aïnouz
2007	Mutum		Sandra Kogut
2008	If Nothing Else Works Out	Se Nada Mais Der Certo	José Eduardo Belmonte
2009	The Famous and The Dead	Os Famosos e os Duendes da Morte	Esmir Filho
2010	VIPs		Toniko Melo
2011	Matraga	A Hora e a Vez de Augusto Matraga	Vinícius Coimbra
2012	Neighboring Sounds	O Som ao Redor	Kleber Mendonça Filho
2013	A Wolf at the Door	O Lobo Atrás da Porta	Fernando Coimbra
2013	Underage	De Menor	Caru Alves de Souza
2014	Blue Blood	Sangue azul	Lírio Ferreira
2015	Neon Bull	Boi neon	Gabriel Mascaro
2016	The Other End	Fala Comigo	Felipe Sholl
2017	Good Manners	As Boas Maneiras	Juliana Rojas and Marco Dutra
2018	Hard Paint	Tinta bruta	Marcio Reolon and Filipe Matzembacher
2019	Party Over	Fim de Festa	Hilton Lacerda
2021	Medusa		Anita Rocha da Silveira
2022	Paloma		Marcelo Gomes
2023	The Battle	A Batalha da Rua Maria Antônia	Vera Egito
2024	Baby		Marcelo Caetano
2024	Malu		Pedro Freire
2025	Little Creatures	Pequenas Criaturas	Anne Pinheiro Guimarães
