= Filipe Matzembacher =

Brazilian film director and writer (born 1988)

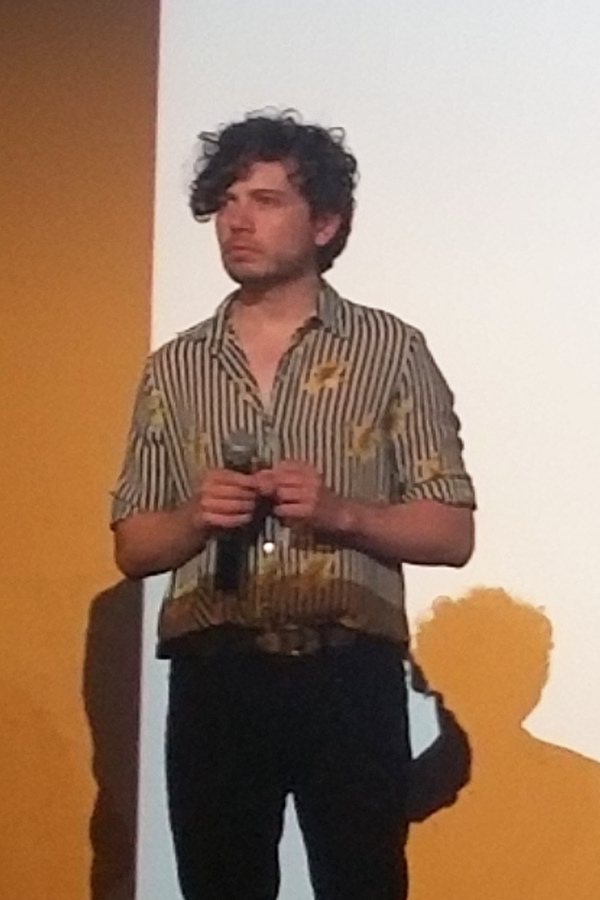
- Matzembacher at the Castro Theatre in San Francisco, California (2018).
- Born: 20 June 1988 (age 36); Porto Alegre, Rio Grande do Sul, Brazil
- Occupations: Film director; writer
- Years active: 2009–present
- Known for: Seashore

Filipe Matzembacher (born June 20, 1988) is a Brazilian film director and writer.

== Filmography ==
=== As director ===
Year	Title	Notes
2010	Quando a Casa Cresce e Cria Limo	Short film
2011	Nico	Short film
2012	Other Than	Documentary
2012	Um Diálogo de Ballet	Documentary short
2013	Cinco Maneiras de Fechar os Olhos	
2013	Quarto Vazio	Short film
2014	Por mais que eu te leve pelos caminhos	Short film
2015	Seashore	
2016	O Ninho	
2016	The Last Day Before Zanzibar	
2018	Hard Paint	
2025	Night Stage	

=== As actor ===
Year	Title	Role	Notes
2009	Por Uma Noite Apenas	Thiago	Short film
