= Biarritz Film Festival =

International film festival in Biarritz, France

Coordinates: 43.48°N 1.56°W

- Location: Biarritz, France
- Founded: 1979
- Website: http://www.festivaldebiarritz.com/

The Biarritz Festival Latin America (French: Festival Biarritz Amérique Latine) is an international film festival held annually in the French city of Biarritz since 1979.

== Awards ==
- HUG for Best Feature
- Jury Award for Best Feature
- Best Actress
- Best Actor
- Feature Film Audience Award in collaboration with Air France
- Prize of the French Union of Film Critics
- HUG for Documentary, Latin Union Festival of Biarritz
- Audience Award for Best Documentary Film
- HUG for Best Short film
- Special Mentions of the Short Film Jury
- Prizes Shorts TV Numéricâble

== Award winners ==
=== 2025 ===
Feature Films

- HUG Award for Best Film: La Hija Cóndor by Álvaro Olmos Torrico (Bolivia, Peru, Uruguay)
- Special Jury Prize: Bajo el Mismo Sol by Ulises Porra (Dominican Republic, Spain)
- Best Performance: Ubeimar Rios for A Poet (Colombia)
- Jury Coup de Coeur: The Best Mother in the World (A melhor mãe do mundo) by Anna Muylaert (Brazil)
- French Syndicate of Cinema Critics Award: Bajo el Mismo Sol by Ulises Porra (Dominican Republic, Spain)
- Biarritz Award: Bajo el Mismo Sol by Ulises Porra (Dominican Republic, Spain)
- Audience Award: Belén by Dolores Fonzi (Argentina)

Documentary Films

- Best Documentary Film: Toroboro: El Nombre de las Plantas by Manolo Sarmiento (Ecuador)
- Special Mention: Identidad by Florencia Santucho and Rodrigo Vazquez-Salessi (Argentina, United Kingdom, Qatar)
- IHEAL Student Jury Award: Si Vas para Chile by Amilcar Infante and Sebastián González (Chile)
- Audience Award: Runa Simi by Augusto Zegarra (Peru)

Short Films

- Best Short Film: Domingo Familiar by Gerardo del Razo (Mexico)
- Special Mention:Buscando un Burro by Juan Vicente Manrique (Venezuela, Mexico)
- Queer Look Award: Presépio by Felipe Bibian (Brazil)

=== 2024 ===
Feature Films

- HUG Award for Best Film: Baby by Marcelo Caetano (Brazil, France)
- Special Jury Prize: El Aroma del Pasto Recién Cortado by Celina Murga (Argentina, Uruguay, Germany, Mexico, United States)
- Best Performance: Paulina García and Jenny Navarette for Beloved Tropic (Querido trópico) by Ana Endara (Panama, Colombia)
- Jury Coup de Coeur: Through Rocks and Clouds (Raíz) by Franco García Becerra (Peru, Chile)
- French Syndicate of Cinema Critics Award: Zafari by Mariana Rondón (Venezuela, Peru, Mexico, Brazil, France, Chile, Dominican Republic)
- Biarritz Award: Senhoritas by Mykaela Plotkin (Brazil)
- Audience Award: Beloved Tropic (Querido trópico) by Ana Endara (Panama, Colombia)

Documentary Films

- Best Documentary Film: Oasis by Tamara Uribe and Felipe Morgado (Chile)
- IHEAL Student Jury Award: Los Últimos by Sebastián Peña Escobar (Paraguay, Uruguay, France)
- Audience Award: Una Canción para mi Tierra by Mauricio Albornoz Iniesta (Argentina, Germany, Colombia)

Short Films

- Best Short Film: Mala Facha by Ilén Juambeltz (Uruguay)
- Special Mention: Utopia Muda by Julio Matos (Brazil)

=== 2023 ===
Feature Films

- HUG Award for Best Film: Power Alley (Levante) by Lillah Halla (Brazil, France, Uruguay)
- Special Jury Prize: Un Pájaro Azul by Ariel Rotter (Argentina, Uruguay)
- Best Performance: Alfonso Tort for Un Pájaro Azul (Argentina, Uruguay)
- Jury Coup de Coeur: The Punishment (El castigo) by Matías Bize (Chile, Argentina)
- French Syndicate of Cinema Critics Award: The Settlers (Los colonos) by Felipe Gálvez Haberle (Chile, Argentina, France, Taiwan, United Kingdom, Denmark, Sweden, Germany)
- Biarritz Award: The Punishment (El castigo) by Matías Bize (Chile, Argentina)
- Audience Award: The Punishment (El castigo) by Matías Bize (Chile, Argentina)

Documentary Films

- Best Documentary Film: Adieu Sauvage by Serfio Guataquira Sarmiento (Colombia, Belgium, France)
- Special Mention: A Invenção do Outro by Bruno Jorge (Brazil) and Nosotras by Emilce Quevedo Díaz (Colombia)
- IHEAL Student Jury Award: El Juicio by Ulises de la Orden (Argentina, Italy, France, Norway)
- Audience Award: The Echo (El eco) by Tatiana Huezo (Mexico, Germany)

Short Films

- Best Short Film: Takanakuy by Gustavo Bockos (Brazil, Peru)
- Special Mention: Antes de Madrid by Nicolás Botana and Ilén Juambeltz Uruguay)

BAL-LAB

- BAL-LAB Award for Best Documentary Film: El Tiempo Después by Fede Pintos (Argentina)
- BAL-LAB Award for Best Fiction Film: Bajo de Agua by Itzel Sacnité Garcia (Mexico)
- Crystal Publishing Award: Siempre Vuelven by Sergio de León (Germany)
- L'Alhambra Studios Award: La Luz de Masao Nakagawa by Hideki Nakazaki (Peru, Mexico)

=== 2022 ===
Feature Films

- HUG Award for Best Film: The Kings of the World (Los reyes del mundo) by Laura Mora (Colombia)
- Special Jury Prize: Punto Rojo by Nicanor Loreti (Argentina)
- Jury Coup de Coeur: Daniela Marín for her performance in I Have Electric Dreams (Tengo sueños eléctricos) (Costa Rica, Belgium, France)
- French Syndicate of Cinema Critics Award: Daughter of Rage (La hija de todas las rabias) by Laura Baumeister (Nicaragua, Mexico, Netherlands, Germany, France, Norway)
- Biarritz Award: Daughter of Rage (La hija de todas las rabias) by Laura Baumeister (Nicaragua, Mexico, Netherlands, Germany, France, Norway)
- Audience Award: 1976 by Manuela Martelli (Chile, Argentina)

Documentary Films

- Best Documentary Film: Retratos del Futuro by Virna Molina (Argentina)
- IHEAL Student Jury Award: Alis by Clare Weiskopf and Nicolas Van Hemelryck (Chile, Colombia, Romania, Denmark)
- Audience Award: Alis by Clare Weiskopf and Nicolas Van Hemelryck (Chile, Colombia, Romania, Denmark)

Short Films

- Best Short Film: Fantasma Neon by Leonardo Martinelli (Brazil)
- Special Mention: La Baláhna by Xóchitl Enríquez Mendoza (Mexico)

BAL-LAB

- BAL-LAB Award for Best Documentary Film: Cuando Todos se Vayan by Felipe Rodríguez Cerda (Chile)
- BAL-LAB Award for Best Fiction Film: Todo Esto Eran Mangas by Daniela Abad (Colombia)
- CNC Development Assistance Grant Recipient: Los Pájaros by Fabián Hernández (Colombia)
- Crystal Publishing Award: Fantasma Neon by Leonardo Martinelli (Brazil)
- Alhambra Studios Award: La Primavera de los Anacoretas by Andrés Kaiser (Mexico)
- Lily Post Prod-Etalonage Award: Esencia Habana by Luis Ernesto Doñas (Cuba)

=== 2021 ===
Feature Films

- HUG Award for Best Film: Jesús López by Maximiliano Schonfeld (Argentina, France)
- Special Jury Prize: Candela by Andrés Farías Cintrón (Dominican Republic, France)
- Jury Special Mention for Best Performance: Natalia Cabral and Oriol Estrada for Una Película Sobre Parejas (Dominican Republic)
- French Syndicate of Cinema Critics Award: Una Película Sobre Parejas by Natalia Cabral and Oriol Estrada (Dominican Republic)
- Audience Award: Fanny Camina by Alfredo Arias and Ignacio Masllorens (Argentina, France)

Documentary Films

- Best Documentary Film: Qué Será del Verano by Ignacio Ceroi (Argentina)
- Special Mention: Vaychiletik by Juan Javier Pérez (Mexico)
- IHEAL Student Jury Award: Edna by Eryk Rocha (Brazil)
- Audience Award: Cantos de Represión by Marianne Hougen-Moraga and Estephan Wagner (Chile, Denmark, Netherlands)

Short Films

- Best Short Film: Entre Ellas by Roxane Florin (Mexico)
- Special Mention: La Luz de Masao Nakagawa by Hideki Nakazaki (Peru, Mexico)

BAL-LAB

- BAL-LAB Award for Best Documentary Film: Bea VII by Natalia Garayalde (Argentina)
- BAL-LAB Award for Best Fiction Film: Godspeed Satan by José Pablo Escamilla (Mexico)
- Jury Special Mention: What's in the Air by Laura Santullo and Rodrigo Plá (Mexico)
- CNC Development Assistance Grant Recipient: On Top of the Cliff by Enrica Pérez (Peru)

=== 2020 ===
Feature Films

- HUG Award for Best Film: Ofrenda by Juan María Mónaco (Argentina)
- Special Jury Prize: Fortitude (La fortaleza) by Jorge Thielen Armand (Venezuela, Colombia, France, Netherlands)
- French Syndicate of Cinema Critics Award: Window Boy Would Also Like to Have a Submarine (Chico ventana también quisiera tener un submarino) by Alex Piperno (Uruguay, Argentina, Brazil, Netherlands, Philippines)
- Audience Award: Tragic Jungle (Selva trágica) by Yulene Olaizola (Mexico, France, Colombia)

Documentary Films

- Best Documentary Film: El Otro by Francisco Bermejo (Chile)
- IHEAL Student Jury Award: O Índio Cor de Rosa Contra a Fera Invisível by Tiago Carvalho (Brazil)
- Audience Award: O Índio Cor de Rosa Contra a Fera Invisível by Tiago Carvalho (Brazil)

Short Films

- Best Short Film: Teoría Social Numérica by Paola Michaels (Colombia)

BAL-LAB

- BAL-LAB Award for Best Documentary Film: Es Mentira Que Debes Obedecer by Bruno Santamaría (Mexico)
- BAL-LAB Award for Best Fiction Film: La Casa del Perro by Federico Borgia (Uruguay)
- CNC Development Assistance Grant Recipient: Morir de Pie by María Paz González (Chile)

=== 2019 ===
Feature Films

- HUG Award for Best Film: The Fever (A Febre) by Maya Da-Rin (Brazil, France, Germany)
- Special Jury Prize: The Invisible Life of Eurídice Gusmão (A Vida invisível de Eurídice Gusmão) by Karim Aïnouz (Brazil, Germany)
- Special Mention: Song Without a Name (Canción sin nombre) by Melina León (Peru, Spain, United States)
- French Syndicate of Cinema Critics Award: The Invisible Life of Eurídice Gusmão (A Vida invisível de Eurídice Gusmão) by Karim Aïnouz (Brazil, Germany)
  - Special Mention: Las Buenas Intenciones by Ana García Blaya (Argentina)
- Audience Award: La Llorona by Jayro Bustamante (Guatemala, France)

Documentary Films

- Best Documentary Film: La Vida en Común by Ezequiel Yanco (Argentina, France)
- Audience Award: La Búsqueda by Daniel Lagares and Mariano Agudo (Peru, Spain)

Short Films

- Best Short Film: O Mistério da Carne by Rafaela Camelo (Brazil)
- Special Mention: Hogar by Gerardo Minutti (Uruguay)

BAL-LAB

- BAL-LAB Award for Best Documentary Film: Ceci Bon by Rodrigo John (Brazil)
- BAL-LAB Award for Best Fiction Film: Sangue Do Meu Sangue by Rafaela Camelo (Brazil)

=== 2018 ===
Feature Films

- HUG Award for Best Film: Birds of Passage (Pájaros by verano) by Cristina Gallego and Ciro Guerra (Colombia, Mexico)
- Special Jury Prize: La Flor by Mariano Llinás (Argentina)
- French Syndicate of Cinema Critics Award: Unremember (Deslembro) by Flávia Castro (Brazil)
- Audience Award: A Twelve-Year Night (La noche de 12 años) by Álvaro Brechner (Uruguay, Argentina)

Documentary Films

- Best Documentary Film: Tranny Fag (Bixa Travesty) by Claudia Priscilla and Kiko Goifman (Brazil)
- Special Mention: Modelo Estéreo by Colectivo Mario Grande (Colombia)
- Audience Award: Locura al Aire by Alicia Cano and Leticia Cuba (Uruguay, Mexico)

Short Films

- Best Short Film: O Órfãoby Carolina Markowicz (Brazil)
- Special Mention: El Verano del León Eléctrico by Diego Céspedes (Chile)

Project Lizières

- Lizières Award: Un Personaje Volador by Martina Juncadella (Argentina)
- The Landscapes That You Seek by Juanita Onzaga (Colombia)

=== 2017 ===
Feature Films

- HUG Award for Best Film: The Family (La familia) by Gustavo Rondón Córdova (Venezuela)
- Special Jury Prize: Los Perros by Marcela Said (Chile)
- Special Mention: Good Manners (As Boas Maneiras) by Juliana Rojas and Marco Dutra (Brazil)
- Best Actress: Gabriela Ramos for Last Days in Havana (Últimos días en La Habana) (Cuba)
- Best Actor: Daniel Aráoz for A Sort of Family (Una especie de familia) (Argentina)
- French Syndicate of Cinema Critics Award: La Soledad by Jorge Thielen Armand (Venezuela)
- Audience Award: Last Days in Havana (Últimos días en La Habana) by Fernando Pérez (Cuba)

Short Films

- Best Short Film: Centauro de Nicolas Suarez (Argentina)
- Special Mention: Damiana by Andrés Ramírez Pulido (Colombia, Brazil)
- TV5 Monde Award for Best Short Film: Selva by Sofia Quiros Ubeda (Costa Rica, Argentina, Chile)

Documentary Films

- Best Documentary Film: Cine São Paulo by Ricardo Martensen and Felipe Tomazelli (Brazil)
- Special Mention: Chavela by Catherine Gund and Daresha Kyi (Mexico, United States)
- Audience Award: Chavela by Catherine Gund and Daresha Kyi (Mexico, United States)

Project Lizières

- Lizières Award: A Dupla Naturaleza da Luz by Marcia Mansur and Marina Thomé (Brazil)

=== 2016 ===
Feature Films

- HUG Award for Best Film: Where I Grow Old (A cidade onde envelheço) by Marilia Rocha (Brazil)
- Special Jury Prize: Aquarius by Kleber Mendonça Filho (Brazil))
- Best Actress: Sônia Braga for Aquarius (Brazil)
- Best Actor: Alejandro Sieveking for The Winter (El invierno) (Argentina)
- Audience Award: El Amparo by Robert Calzadilla (Venezuela)
- French Syndicate of Cinema Critics Award: The Winter (El invierno) by Emiliano Torres (Argentina)

Short Films

- HUG Award for Best Short Film: El Edén by Andrés Ramírez Pulido (Colombia)
- Special Mention: Rosinha by Gui Campos (Brazil)
- TV5 Monde Award: Caminho dos gigantes by Alois Di Leo (Brazil)

Project Lizières

- Lizières Award: El Edén by Andrés Ramírez Pulido (Colombia)

Documentary Films

- HUG Award for Best Documentary Film: Nueva Venecia by Emiliano Mazza de Luca (Uruguay)
- Special Mentions: Damiana Kryygi by Alejandro Fernández Mouján (Argentina) and Yo No Soy de Aquí by Maite Alberdi (Chile)
- Audience Award: Exil-Sur-Scène by Jean-Michel Rodrigo and Marina Paugan (France)

=== 2015 ===
Feature Films

- HUG Award for Best Film: Ixcanul by Jayro Bustamante (Guatemala)
- Special Jury Prize: A Monster with a Thousand Heads (Un monstruo by mil cabezas) by Rodrigo Plá (Mexico)
- Best Actress: Dolores Fonzi for Paulina (La patota) (Argentina)
- Best Actor: Luis Silva for From Afar (Desde allá) (Venezuela, Mexico)
- Audience Award: The Perfect Dictatorship (La dictadura perfecta) by Luis Estrada (Mexico)
- French Syndicate of Cinema Critics Award: Ixcanul by Jayro Bustamante (Guatemala)

Short Films

- HUG Award for Best Short Film: O Bom Comportamento by Eva Randolph (Brazil)
- Special Mention: Domingo by Raúl López Echeverría (Mexico)
- TV5 Monde Award: Las Cosas Simples by Álvaro Anguita (Chile)
- Young Jury Award for Best Short Film: Echo Chamber by Guillermo Moncayo (Colombia)

Project Lizières

- Lizières Award: En la Piel del Otro by Natalia Bruschtein (Argentina, Mexico)

Documentary Films

- HUG Award for Best Documentary Film: Invasion by Abner Benaim (Panama)
- Audience Award: La Once by Maite Alberdi (Chile)

=== 2014 ===
Feature Films

- HUG Award for Best Film: Return to Ithaca (Retour à Ithaque) by Laurent Cantet (Cuba, France)
- Special Jury Prize: Las Búsquedas by José Luis Valle (Mexico)
- Best Actress: Erica Rivas for Wild Tales (Relatos Salvajes) (Argentina)
- Best Actor: Héctor Noguera and Néstor Guzzini for Mr. Kaplan (Uruguay)
- Audience Award: Wild Tales (Relatos Salvajes) by Damián Szifron (Argentina)
- French Syndicate of Cinema Critics Award: La Salada by Juan Martín Hsu (Argentina)

Short Films

- HUG Award for Best Short Film: Padre by Santiago Bou Grasso (Argentina)
- Deuxième Best Short Film: El Sonámbulo by Lenz Mauricio Claure (Mexico)

Documentary Films

- HUG Award for Best Documentary Film: Café by Hatuey Viveros Lavielle (Mexico)
- Special Mention: Poder e Impotencia, un Drama en Tres Actos d'Anna Recalde Miranda (Paraguay)
- Audience Award: Mercedes Sosa, la Voz de Latinoamérica by Rodrigo H. Vila (Argentina)

Lizières Award

- Berlín by José Luis Valle (Mexico, El Salvador)

=== 2013 ===
Feature Films

- HUG Award for Best Film: Workers by José Luis Valle (Mexico)
- Prix du Jury: El Tío by Mateo Iribarren (Chile)
- Best Actress: The female ensemble of The Amazing Catfish (Los insólitos peces gato) (Mexico)
- Best Actor: Lisandro Rodríguez for La Paz (Argentina)
- French Syndicate of Cinema Critics Award: The Summer of Flying Fish (El verano de los peces voladores) by Marcela Said (Chile)
- Audience Award: 7 Boxes (7 cajas) by Juan Carlos Maneglia and Tana Schémbori (Paraguay)

Short Films

- HUG Award for Best Short Film: Solecito by Óscar Ruiz Navia (Colombia)
- Deuxième Best Short Film: La Noria by Karla Castañeda (Mexico)

Documentary Films

- HUG Award for Best Documentary Film: El Impenetrable by Daniele Incalcaterra (Argentina)
- Special Mention: Madera by Daniel Kvitko (Cuba)
- Audience Award: Ensayo de una Nación by Alexis Roitman (Argentina)

=== 2012 ===
Feature Films

- HUG Award for Best Film: De Martes a Martes by Gustavo Triviño (Argentina)
- Special Jury Prize: Juan of the Dead (Juan de los muertos) by Alejandro Brugués (Cuba)
- Best Actress: Roxana Blanco for The Delay (La demora) (Mexico, Uruguay)
- Best Actor: Luis Tosar for Operation E (Operación E) (Colombia, Spain)
- French Syndicate of Cinema Critics Award: No by Pablo Larraín (Chile)
- Audience Award: Sofía y el Terco by Andrés Burgos Vallejo (Colombia)

Short Films

- HUG Award for Best Short Film: Temporada Seca by Diego Rivera-Kohn (Mexico)
- Deuxième Best Short Film: Qual Queijo Vocé Quer by Cíntia Domit Bittar (Brazil)
- Special Mention: A Galinha Que Burlou o Sistema by Quico Mereilles (Brazil)

Documentary Films

- HUG Award for Best Documentary Film: El Etnógrafo by Ulises Rosell (Argentina)
- Special Mention: Uno al Otro by Milena Almira (Cuba)
- Audience Award: La Máquina Loca by Emilio Maillé (Mexico)

=== 2011 ===
Feature Films

- HUG Award for Best Film: Las Acacias by Pablo Giorgelli (Argentina)
- Special Jury Prize: Porfirio by Alejandro Landes (Colombia)
- Best Actress: Paula Galinelli Hertzog for The Prize (El premio) (Mexico)
- Best Actor: Porfirio Ramirez for Porfirio (Colombia)
- French Syndicate of Cinema Critics Award: The Prize (El premio) by Paula Markovitch (Mexico)
- Audience Award: Ticket to Paradise (Boleto al paraíso) by Gerardo Chijona (Cuba)

Short Films

- HUG Award for Best Short Film: Coral by Ignacio Chaneton (Argentina)
- Special Mention: Luminaris by Juan Pablo Zaramella (Argentina)
- Shorts TV Numericable Award: Café con leche by Mauricio Leiva Cock (Colombia)

Documentary Films

- HUG Award for Best Documentary Film: Abuelos by Carla Valencia Davila (Ecuador, Chile)
- Special Mention: El Lugar Más Pequeño by Tatiana Huezo (El Salvador, Mexico)
- Audience Award: El Tren de las Moscas by Nieves Prieto Tassier and Fernando Lopes Castillo (Mexico)

=== 2010 ===
Feature Films

- HUG Award for Best Film: Revolución by Amat Escalante, Carlos Reygadas, Diego Luna, Fernando Eimbcke, Gael García Bernal, Gerardo Naranjo, Mariana Chenillo, Patricia Riggen, Rodrigo García and Rodrigo Plá (Mexico)
- Special Jury Prize: Zona Sur by Juan Carlos Valdivia (Bolivia)
- Best Actress: Nanda Costa, Amanda Diniz and Kika Farias for Sonhos Roubados by Sandra Werneck (Brazil)
- Best Actor: Osmar Nuñez for The Invisible Eye (La mirada invisible) (Argentina)
- Audience Award: 5x Favela - Agora por Nós Mesmos by Manaira Carneiro, Wagner Novais, Rodrigo Felha, Cacau Amaral, Luciano Vidigal, Cadu Barcelos and Luciana Bezerra (Brazil)

Short Films

- HUG Award for Best Short Film: Los Minutos, las Horas by Janaína Marques Ribeiro (Cuba)
- ShortsTV – Numéricable Award : La Mina by Pro by Jacques Bonnavent (Mexico)
- Special Mentions: Un Nuevo Baile by Nicolás Lasnibat (Chile) and No Me Ama by Martín Piroyansky (Argentina)

Documentary Films

- HUG Award for Best Documentary Film: Diário de Uma Busca by Flávia Castro (Brazil)
- Audience Award: Nostalgia for the Light (Nostalgia by la luz) by Patricio Guzmán (Chile)

=== 2009 ===
Feature Films

- HUG Award for Best Film: Nora's Will (Cinco dias sin Nora) by Mariana Chenillo (Mexico)
- Special Jury Prize: The Paranoids (Los paranoicos) by Gabriel Medina (Argentina)
- Best Actress: Catalina Saavedra for The Maid (La Nana) (Chile)
- Best Actor: Daniel Hendler for The Paranoids (Los paranoicos) (Argentina)
- French Syndicate of Cinema Critics Award: The Maid (La Nana) by Sebastian Silva (Chile)
- Audience Award: Horn of Plenty (El cuerno by la abundancia) by Juan Carlos Tabio (Cuba)
- European Young Jury Award: The Maid (La Nana) by Sebastian Silva (Chile)

Short Films

- HUG Award for Best Short Film: Distancias by Matias Lucchesi (Argentina)
- Special Mention: El hombre muerto by Julian Goyoaga (Uruguay)
- European Young Jury Award: Espalhadas pelo Ar by Vera Egito (Brazil)
- Numéricable Award: Un Juego Absurdo by Gaston Rothschild (Argentina)

Documentary Films

- Latin Union Award: Mi Vida con Carlos by German Berger Hertz (Chile, Spain)
- Special Mention: Los Que Se Quedan by Juan Carlos Rulfo and Carlos Hagerman (Mexico) and La Chirola by Diego Mondaca (Bolivia, Cuba)
- ENS Louis Lumière School Award: La Chirola by Diego Mondaca (Bolivia, Cuba)

Biarritz Young Directors

- Biarritz Young Directors Award: Días Robados by Fernando Guzzoni (Chile)

=== 2008 ===
Feature Films

- HUG Award for Best Film: Gods (Dioses) by Josué Méndez (Peru)
- Special Jury Prize: Estômago by Marcos Jorge (Brazil)
- Best Performance : Aline Kuppenheim, Manuela Martelli and Roberto Farias for The Good Life (La buena vida) (Chile)
- Audience Award: Insignificant Things (Cosas insignificantes) by Andrea Martínez Crowther (Mexico)
- European Young Jury Award: La Rabia by Albertina Carri (Argentina)

Short Films

- HUG Award for Best Short Film: El Deseo by Marie Benito (Mexico)
- Special Mention: Ofelia by Humberto Gutierrez Montero (Peru)
- European Young Jury Award: Ahendu nde sapukai by Pablo Lamar (Paraguay)
- ENS Louis Lumière School Award: Ahendu nde sapukai by Pablo Lamar (Paraguay)
- Numéricable Award: Cuilos by Paz Fábrega (Costa Rica)

Documentary Films

- Latin Union Award for Best Documentary Film: La Sombra de Don Roberto by Juan Diego Spoerer and Hakan Enström (Chile)
- Special Mention: Entre a Luz e a Sombra by Luciana Burlamaqui (Brazil)
- Audience Award: Entre a Luz e a Sombra by Luciana Burlamaqui (Brazil)
- Voyage Award: La Matinée by Sebastián Bednarik (Uruguay)

Biarritz Young Directors

- Biarritz Young Directors Award: Thursday Till Sunday (De jueves a domingo) by Dominga Sotomayor (Chile)

=== 2007 ===
Feature Films

- HUG Award for Best Film: Postcards from Leningrad (Postales de Leningrado) by Mariana Rondón (Venezuela)
- Special Jury Prize: La Noche de los Inocentes by Arturo Sotto (Cuba)
- Best Performance: Ana Carabajal and Luisa Nuñez for Por Sus Propios Ojos (Argentina)
- Audience Award: Matar a Todos by Esteban Schroeder (Uruguay, Argentina, Chile)
- European Young Jury Award: La Sangre Iluminada by Iván Avila Dueñas (Mexico)

Short Films

- HUG Award for Best Short Film: Temporal by Paz Fábrega (Costa Rica)
- ENS Louis Lumière School Award: El Secreto de la Sangre by María Victoria Andino (Argentina)
- European Young Jury Award: Tiene la Tarde Ojos by Carlos Sama (Mexico)

Documentary Films

- Latin Union Award for Best Documentary Film: Secretos de Lucha by Maiana Bidegain (France, Uruguay)
- Special Mention: Los Ladrones Viejos by Everardo Gonzalez (Mexico)

Biarritz Young Directors

- Biarritz Young Directors Award: 1994 by Jean-Marc Rousseau (Mexico)

=== 2006 ===
Feature Films

- HUG Award for Best Film: Forbidden to Forbid (Proibido Proibir) by Jorge Duran (Brazil)
- Special Jury Prize: In the Pit (En el hoyo) by Juan Carlos Rulfo (Mexico)
- Best Actress: Melania Urbina for Black Butterfly (Mariposa negra) (Peru)
- Best Actor: Manuel Calisto for Cuando Me Toque a Mí (Ecuador)
- Audience Award: On Probation (Tiempo de valientes) by Damian Szifron (Argentina)
- European Young Jury Award: The Greatest Love of All (O maior amor do mundo) by Carlos Diegues (Brazil)

Short Films

- HUG Award for Best Short Film: Alguma coisa assim by Esmir Filho (Brazil)
- ENS Louis Lumière School Award: 76 by Lucas Schiaroli (Argentina)
- Prix Cinécourt by Cinécinéma: XX by Cristián Jiménez (Chile)
- European Young Jury Award: 76 by Lucas Schiaroli (Argentina)

Documentary Films

- Latin Union Award for Best Documentary Film: Hartos Evos Aqui Hay by Héctor Ulloque Franco and Manuel Montealegre (Colombia)
- Special Mention: La Palomilla Salvaje by Gustavo Gamou (Mexico)

Biarritz Young Directors

- Biarritz Young Directors Award: Hombre de Pieza by Celso R. García (Mexico)

=== 2005 ===
Feature Films

- HUG Award for Best Film: Tatuado by Eduardo Raspo (Argentina)
- Special Jury Prize: Noticias Lejanas by Ricardo Benet (Mexico)
- Best Actress: Roxana Blanco for Alma Mater (Uruguay)
- Best Actor: Julio Jung for Cachimba (Chile)
- Audience Award: Maroa by Solveig Hoogestejin (Venezuela)

Documentary Films

- Latin Union Award for Best Documentary Film: Seres Extravagantes by Manuel Zayas (Cuba, Spain)

Short Films

- HUG Award for Best Short Film: El Pasajero by Matias Meyer (Mexico) and El Tesoro de los Caracoles by Cristián Jiménez (Chile)
- ENS Louis Lumière School Award: La Vida y Obra de John H by Lourdes Rebora (Mexico)
- Cinécourts by Cinécinema Award: El Tesoro de los Caracoles by Cristián Jiménez (Chile)

=== 2004 ===
Feature Films

- Soleil d'Or for Best Film: Whisky Romeo Zulu by Enrique Piñeyro (Argentina)
- Soleil d'Or for Best Actress: China Zorrilla for Conversations with Mother (Conversaciones con mamá) (Argentina)
- Soleil d'Or for Best Actor: Roque Valero for Punto y Raya (Venezuela)
  - Special Mention: Leonardo Ramírez for El Cielito by María Victoria Menis (Argentina)
- France Bleu Audience Award: Conversations with Mother (Conversaciones con mamá) by Santiago Carlos Oves (Argentina)

Short Films

- Cinécourt by Cinecinema Award: Los elefantes nunca olvidan by Lorenzo Vigas (Venezuela)

=== 2003 ===
Feature Films

- Soleil d'Or for Best Film: Ojos Que No Ven by Francisco Lombardi (Peru)
- Soleil d'Or for Best Actress: Paulina Gálvez for Subterra (Chile)
- Soleil d'Or for Best Actor: Luis Fernando Peñaes for Amar Te Duele (Mexico)
- Special Mention: Un Titan en el Ring by Viviana Cordero (Ecuador)
- France Bleu Audience Award: Amar Te Duele by Fernando Sariñana (Mexico)

Documentary Films

- Latin Union Award for Best Documentary Film: Estadio Nacional by Carmen Luz Parot (Chile)

Short Films

- Soleil d'Or for Best Short Film: Como se morre no cinema by Luelane Loiola Corrêa (Brazil)

=== 2002 ===
Feature Films

- Soleil d'Or for Best Film: Como el Gato y el Ratón by Rodrigo Triana (Colombia)
- Soleil d'Or for Best Actress: Beatriz Thibaudin for Tan de Repente (Argentina)
- Soleil d'Or for Best Actor: Julio Chávez for Un Oso Rojo (Argentina)
- Special Mention: Madame Satã by Karim Aïnouz (Brazil)
- France Bleu Audience Award: Valentín by Alejandro Agresti (Argentina)

Short Films

- Soleil d'Or for Best Short Film: El Último Vagón by Osvaldo Daicich (Argentina)

Documentary Films

- Latin Union Award for Best Documentary Film: The Island of the Lost Children (La isla de los niños perdidos) by Florence Jaugey Nicaragua

=== 2001 ===
Feature Films

- Soleil d'Or for Best Film: Brainstorm (Bicho de Sete Cabeças) by Laís Bodanzky (Brazil)
- Soleil d'Or for Best Actress: Tamara Acosta and Loreto Moya for La Fiebre del Loco (Chile)
- Soleil d'Or for Best Actor: Ricardo Darín and Gastón Pauls for Nine Queens (Nueve reinas) (Argentina)
- Special Mention: To the Left of the Father (Lavoura Arcaica) by Luis Fernando Cavalho (Brazil)
- France Bleu Audience Award: Una Casa con Vista al Mar by Alberto Arvelo Mendoza (Venezuela)

Short Films

- Soleil d'Or for Best Short Film: O Branco by Angela Pires and Liliana Sulzbach (Brazil)

Documentary Films

- Latin Union Award for Best Documentary Film: Onde a Terra Acaba by Sérgio Machado (Brazil)
- Special Mention: Latido Latino by Eterio Ortega Santillana and José P. Estepa (Spain)

=== 2000 ===
Feature Films

- Soleil d'Or for Best Film: Un Amor de Borges by Javier Torre (Argentina)
- Soleil d'Or for Best Actress: Béatrice Agenin for Amelia (Brazil)
- Soleil d'Or for Best Actor: Jean-Pierre Noher for Un Amor de Borges (Argentina)
- France Bleu Audience Award: Waiting for the Messiah (Esperando al mesías) by Daniel Burman (Argentina)

Short Films

- Soleil d'Or for Best Short Film: Nostalgia en la Mesa 8 by Andrés Muschietti (Argentina)

Documentary Films

- Latin Union Award for Best Documentary Film: The Day that You Love Me (El día que me quieras) by Florence Jaugey Nicaragua

=== 1999 ===
Feature Films

- Soleil d'Or for Best Film: Yepeto by Eduardo Calcagno (Argentina)
- Soleil d'Or for Best Actress: Flora Martínez for Soplo de Vida (Colombia)
- Soleil d'Or for Best Actor: Ulises Dumont for Yepeto (Argentina)
- France Bleu Audience Award: Yepeto by Eduardo Calcagno (Argentina)

Documentary Films

- Latin Union Award for Best Documentary Film: Fé by Ricardo Dias (Brazil)

Short Films

- Soleil d'Or for Best Short Film: Periférico by Paula Markovitch (Mexico)

=== 1998 ===
Feature Films

- Soleil d'Or for Best Film: Kenoma by Eliane Caffé (Brazil)
- Soleil d'Or for Best Actress: Angela Correa for The Cloud (La Nube) (Argentina)
- Soleil d'Or for Best Actor: Eduardo Pavlovsky for The Cloud (La Nube) (Argentina)
- France Bleu Audience Award: Plaza de Almas by Fernando Díaz (Argentina)

Short Films

- Soleil d'Or for Best Short Film: En es Espejo del Cielo by Carlos Salces (Mexico)

=== 1997 ===
Feature Films

- Soleil d'Or for Best Film: Pandemonium (Pandemonium, la capital del infierno) by Román Chalbaud (Venezuela)
- Soleil d'Or for Best Actress: Leandra Leal for The Oyster and the Wind (A Ostra e o Vento) (Brazil)
- Soleil d'Or for Best Actor: Eusebio Poncela for Martín (Hache) (Argentina)
- France Bleu Audience Award: Eva Perón: The True Story (Eva Perón: la verdadera historia) by Juan Carlos Desanzo (Argentina)

Short Films

- Soleil d'Or for Best Short Film: Ratas by Dieguillo Fernández and Diego Sabanés (Argentina)

=== 1996 ===
Feature Films

- Soleil d'Or for Best Film: Deep Crimson (Profundo carmesí) by Arturo Ripstein (Mexico)
- Soleil d'Or for Best Actress: Margarita Rosa de Francisco for Ilona Arrives with the Rain (Ilona llega con la lluvia) (Venezuela)
- Soleil d'Or for Best Actor: Daniel Alvarado for Desnudo con Naranjas (Venezuela)
- Special Mention: Um Céu de Estrelas by Tata Amaral (Brazil)

Short Films

- Soleil d'Or for Best Short Film: Novia Mia by Rodrigo Plá (Mexico)

=== 1995 ===
Feature Films

- Soleil d'Or for Best Film: Madagascar by Fernando Pérez (Cuba)
- Soleil d'Or for Best Actress: Zaida Castellanos for Madagascar (Cuba)
- Soleil d'Or for Best Actor: Ulises Dumont for El Censor (Argentina)
- Special Mention: Cuestión de Fé by Marco Loayza (Bolivia)
- South-West Audience Award: Guantanamera by Tomás Gutiérrez Alea and Juan Carlos Tabío (Cuba)

Short Films

- Soleil d'Or for Best Short Film: Guarisove by Bruno Stagnaro (Argentina)

=== 1994 ===
Feature Films

- Soleil d'Or for Best Film: Sciario by José Ramón Novoa (Venezuela)

Short Films

- Soleil d'Or for Best Short Film: Calle 22 by Mariana Rondón (Venezuela)

=== 1993 ===
Feature Films

- Soleil d'Or for Best Film: The Strategy of the Snail (La estrategia del caracol) by Sergio Cabrera (Colombia)

=== 1992 ===
Feature Films

- Soleil d'Or for Best Film: The Frontier (La frontera) by Ricardo Larraín (Chile)

== See also ==
- Cinema of Latin America
