= List of Argentine films of 2014 =

This is a list of Argentine films which were released in 2014:

Argentine films of 2014
Title	Director	Release	Genre
A
AB	Iván Fund	10 July	
Aire libre	Anahí Berneri	22 May	
Al fin del mundo	Franca González	31 July	
Algunos días sin música	Matías Rojo	27 March	
El almanaque	José Pedro Charlo	6 February	
Amancio Williams	Gerardo Panero	14 August	
Amapola	Eugenio Zanetti	5 June	
Amar es bendito	Liliana Paolinelli	3 July	
El amor y otras historias	Alejo Flah	16 October	
Anagramas	Santiago Giralt	28 August	
Angelita la doctora	Helena Tritek	9 October	
Años de calle	Alejandra Grinschpun	4 December	
Aprox	Víctor Kesselman	21 August	
El árbitro	Paolo Zucca	25 December	
El ardor	Pablo Fendrik	25 September	
Arrebato	Sandra Gugliotta	11 September	
Las aspas del Molino	Daniel Espinoza García	18 September	
Atlántida	Inés María Barrionuevo	2 October	
A vuelo de pajarito	Santiago García Isler	18 July	
B - C
La ballena va llena	Juan Carlos "Tata" Cedrón	8 August	
Bañeros 4: Los rompeolas	Rodolfo Ledo	10 July	
Barroco	Estanislao Buisel Quintana	19 October	
Betibú	Miguel Cohan	3 April	
Bienvenido León de Francia	Néstor Zapata	6 November	
Boca de pozo	Simón Franco	12 June	
El borde del tiempo	Jorge Rocca	27 March	
Borrando a papá	Ginger Gentile y Sandra Fernández Ferreira	2 October	
El Bumbún	Fernando Bermúdez	13 November	
Buscando al huemul	Juan Diego Kantor	24 April	
La cárcel del fin del mundo	Lucía Vassallo	7 August	
Carta a un padre	Edgardo Cozarinsky	17 May	
Casas, la máquina para vivir	Marina Pessah	21 August	
El casamiento	Aldo Garay	4 December	
La cáscara rota	Florencia Mujica	24 April	
El cerrajero	Natalia Smirnoff	25 September	
Las chicas del 3º	Maximiliano Pelosi	9 October	
El cielo otra vez	Gustavo Alonso	22 May	
El ciudadano ilustre	Gastón Duprat	10 September	
El color que cayó del cielo	Sergio Wolf	17 July	
Como llegar a Piedra Buena	Alejandra Marino	2 May	
Condenados	Carlos Martínez	27 March	
La corporación	Fabián Forte	27 February	
Córtenla, una peli sobre call centers	Ale Cohen	11 September	
El crítico	Hernán Guerschuny	17 April	
Cuando yo te vuelva a ver	Rodolfo Durán	23 May	
Cuerpos de agua	Juan Felipe Chorén	29 May	
D - E
Delirium	Carlos Kaimakamian Carrau	2 October	
Los desechables	Nicolás Savignone	13 February	
Deshora	Bárbara Sarasola-Day	6 February	
De trapito a bachiller	Javier di Pasquo	20 February	
De sus queridas presencias	Norberto Forgione	25 September	
El día fuera del tiempo	Cristina Fasulino	14 August	
Diamante	Emiliano Grieco	16 October	
El día trajo la oscuridad	Martín Desalvo	2 May	
Dos disparos	Martín Rejtman	18 September	
Los dueños	Agustín Toscano	17 April	
Los elegidos	Rodolfo Mórtola	30 October	
En la Puna	Lucas Riselli	27 March	
En los ojos de la memoria	Betiana Burgardt	18 December	
Ensayo de una nación	Alexis Roitman	30 October	
Errata	Iván Vescovo	20 February	
El escarabajo de oro	Alejo Moguillansky y Fia-Stina Sandlund	18 October	
Escuela de sordos	Ada Frontini	10 August	
El estado de las cosas	Joaquín Maito y Tatiana Mazú	6 November	
Fango	José Celestino Campusano	22 May	
Fermín	Hernán Findling y Oliver Kolker	24 April	
Feriado	Diego Araujo	2 October	
Flores de ruina	Julio Midú y Fabio Junco	25 December	
La forma exacta de las islas	Daniel Casabé y Edgardo Dieleke	17 July	
G - M
Gato negro	Gastón Gallo	10 April	
La gente del río	Martín Benchimol y Pablo Aparo	13 November	
El grillo	Matías Herrera Córdoba	13 November	
El grito en la sangre	Fernando Musa	24 April	
Habitares	Marina Zeising	4 December	
Helena	Milka López	13 November	
El hijo buscado	Daniel Gaglianó	4 December	
Historias breves 9	Matías Carrizo, Andrés Ernesto Arduin, Judith Battaglia, Victoria Mammoliti, Luis Bernardez, Cecilia Kang y Luz Orlando Brennan	11 September	
Historias de cronopios y de famas	Julio César Ludueña	28 August	
History of Fear (Historia del miedo)	Benjamín Naishtat	22 May	
Humano	Alan Stivelman	24 April	
I Am Mad	Baltazar Tokman	29 May	
Icaros	Georgina Barreiro		Documental
El inventor de juegos	Juan Pablo Buscarini	3 July	
Inevitable	Jorge Algora	20 March	
Las insoladas	Gustavo Taretto	18 September	
El inventor de juegos	Juan Pablo Buscarini	3 July	
Jardín de sueños	Javier Tanoira y Alejo Yael	9 March	
Jauja	Lisandro Alonso	9 October	
Kajianteya, la que tiene fortaleza	Daniel Samyn	30 October	
El karma de Carmen	Rodolfo Durán	0 October	
La Paz	Santiago Loza	20 February	
Locura que enamora mi ciudad	Maximiliano Baldi	1 May	
Lumpen	Luis Ziembrowski	5 June	
Luna en Leo	Juan Pablo Martínez	6 March	
Madam Baterflai	Carina Sama	2 May	
Making off sangriento: Masacre en el set de filmación	Hernán Quintana y Gonzalo Quintana	31 July	
Malka, una chica de la Zwi Migdal	Walter Tejblum	18 September	
El manto de hiel	Gustavo Corrado	25 September	
Mañana•Tarde•Noche	Federico Falasca, Tatiana Pérez Veiga y Laura Spiner	6 November	
Maravilla, un luchador	Juan Pablo Cadaveira	29 May	
Marea baja	Paulo Pécora	31 July	
María Libre	Leandro Baquela	10 April	
Maxi Kosteki, constructor de caminos	En Movimiento TV	26 June	
Mauro	Hernán Rosselli	9 August	
El mejor de nosotros	Jorge Rocca	13 March	
Me perdí hace una semana	Iván Fund	10 July	
Mika, mi guerra de España	Rodolfo Pochat y Javier Olivera	6 March	
El misterio de la felicidad	Daniel Burman	16 January	Comedia
Motín en Sierra Chica	Jaime Lozano	20 March	
Muerte en Buenos Aires	Natalia Meta	15 May	Suspenso
El muerto y ser feliz	Javier Rebollo	13 November	
Mujeres con pelotas	Ginger Gentile y Gabriel Balanovsky	1 May	
Mujer lobo	Tamae Garateguy	4 September	
N - R
Nacidos vivos	Alejandra Perdomo	20 March	
Los nadies	Néstor Sánchez Sotelo	11 September	
Necrofobia	Daniel de la Vega	18 September	
El nexo	Sebastián Antico	26 June	
El objeto de mi amor	Andrés Martínez Cantó	22 May	
El ojo del tiburón	Alejo Hoijman	6 February	
Los ojos abiertos de América Latina	Miguel Mirra	12 June	
Osvaldo Bayer "La livertá"	Gustavo Gzain	4 December	
El otro Maradona	Ezequiel Luka y Gabriel Amiel		
El otro (no todo es lo que ves)	Daniel De Felippo	13 November	
Pelo malo	Mariana Rondón		
El Perro Molina	José Celestino Campusano	18 December	
Pichuco	Martín Turnes	1 October	Documental
Planta madre	Gianfranco Quattrini	6 November	
Por un puñado de pelos	Néstor Montalbano	30 January	
Las puertas del cielo	Jaime L. Lozano	15 May	
¿Qué puede un cuerpo?	César González	18 December	
¿Qué ves? :: ecos de lo inVISIBLE	Sofía Vaccaro	11 September	
Rambleras	Daniela Speranza	11 December	
Ramón Ayala	Marcos López	16 May	
Reconstruyendo a Cyrano	Eduardo de la Serna	11 December	
Refugiado	Diego Lerman	23 October	
Relatos salvajes	Damián Szifrón	21 August	
Rey Milo	Federico Bareiro	15 May	
Ricardo Bär	Nele Wohlatz	25 September	
Rodencia y el Diente de la Princesa	David Bisbano	13 February	
Rosa fuerte	Laura Dariomerlo	16 October	
El rostro	Gustavo Fontán	3 July	
S - T
Salsipuedes	Mariano Luque	13 February	
Salvar al niño	Bernardo Kononovich	13 March	
Santa Lucía	Andrea Schellemberg	13 March	
El secreto de Lucía	Becky Garello	10 April	
La segunda muerte	Santiago Fernández Calvete	13 March	
Señales	Guido Rossetti	10 April	
Seré millones, el mayor golpe a las finanzas de una dictadura	Fernando Krichmar	4 September	
Sin patrón, una revolución permanente	Juan Pablo Lepore y Nicolás Van Caloen	27 November	
Sin señal	David León Sofia	11 September	Terror
Socios por accidente	Nicanor Loreti	17 July	
Sonata en Si menor	Patricio Escobar	2 May	
T - Z
Tan cerca como pueda	Eduardo Crespo	27 March	
Tango de una noche de verano	Viviane Blumenschein	27 November	
Tenemos un problema, Ernesto	Diego Recalde	16 October	
Los tentados	Mariano Blanco	24 April	
La tercera orilla	Celina Murga	13 March	
El tercero	Rodrigo Guerrero	3 July	
Tiro de gracia	Nicolás Lidijover	7 August	
Tótem	Franca González	31 July	
El tramo	Juan Hendel	6 November	
Tres D	Rosendo Ruiz	9 October	
El triángulo rosa y la cura nazi para la homosexualidad	Nacho Steinberg y Esteban Jasper	30 October	
Tunteyh o el rumor de las piedras	Marina Rubino	18 September	
Úahat	Demián Santander, Juan Franco González y Julián Borrell	9 October	
Ulises, un alma desbordada	Eduardo Calcagno	6 November	
El último mago O Bilembambudin	Diego Cacique Rodríguez	13 November	
Un amor en tiempos de selfies	Emilio Tamer	23 October	
Una noche sin luna	Germán Tejeira	11 December	
UNASUR en Haití, reflejos de una Argentina solidaria	Jorge Diego Gil	11 December	
Un día gris, un día azul, igual al mar	Luciana Terribili y Melina Terribili	8 May	
El verano siguiente	Gabriel Nícoli	6 March	
Viaje a Tombuctú	Rossana Díaz Costa	22 May	
Violetta: En concierto	Diego Bliffeld y Matthew Amos	2 April	
Zanahoria	Enrique Buchichio	11 December	
2/11 Día de los muertos	Ezio Massa	20 November	

== See also ==
- 2014 in Argentina
