= La Faena Films =

Venezuelan-Canadian film production company

La Faena Films is a film production company founded in 2015 by Venezuelan filmmakers Jorge Thielen Armand and Rodrigo Michelangeli. The company has offices in Toronto and Caracas.

== History ==
The company was established in January 2015 by Thielen Armand and Michelangeli. Its productions are international co-productions and have been screened at various film festivals.

== Films ==
La Faena Films has produced four feature films and five short films.

=== Feature films ===
- La Soledad (2016) – directed by Jorge Thielen Armand. The film premiered at the 73rd Venice International Film Festival and was screened at over 60 festivals, receiving 14 awards including the Audience Award at the Miami International Film Festival.
- La Fortaleza (2020) – directed by Jorge Thielen Armand. A co-production between Venezuela, Colombia, France, and the Netherlands. It was selected for the Tiger Competition at the International Film Festival Rotterdam, marking the first Venezuelan production to compete in that section. The film also screened at festivals in Busan, Gijón, Cairo, Rome, and Biarritz, where it received the Jury Prize from critic and film historian Nicole Brenez.
- El Father Plays Himself (2020) – directed by Mo Scarpelli. The film premiered at the 51st Visions du Réel festival in Switzerland, where it received a Special Mention in the International Feature Film Competition. It was later selected for the Best of Fests programme at the International Documentary Film Festival Amsterdam (IDFA).
- Death Has No Master (2026) – directed by Jorge Thielen Armand. A psychological thriller starring Asia Argento, produced by La Faena Films in co-production with Volos Films Italia and Deal Productions. The film premiered at the Directors' Fortnight section of the 2026 Cannes Film Festival.

=== Short films ===
- Ráfagas de Paz (2014) – directed by Rodrigo Michelangeli.
- Flor de la Mar (2015) – directed by Jorge Thielen Armand.
- Of Memory and Debris (2020) – directed by Rodrigo Michelangeli. The film received a Special Mention at the Caracas Film Critics Festival and was released online as a Vimeo Staff Pick.
- Pasta Negra (2025) – directed by Jorge Thielen Armand. A Canadian-Venezuelan-Italian-Colombian co-production based on a short story by Karina Sainz Borgo. The film premiered in the Short Film Competition at the Sundance Film Festival and received the Golden Owl for Best Short Film at the Philosophical Film Festival in North Macedonia and Best Fiction Short at the Festival del Cine Latinoamericano de Rosario in Argentina.
- Forever, Liam (2025) – directed by Guillermo de la Rosa. A Canadian-Venezuelan co-production, the 22-minute Spanish-language horror-drama short follows Alejandro and Paula, whose young relationship takes a dark turn when Paula's parents reveal that they live with the preserved corpse of her grandfather, caring for it as if he were still alive. The film was produced by Pavlo Castillo, Rodrigo Michelangeli, Álvar Carretero de la Fuente, and Guillermo de la Rosa. It screened at festivals including Nevermore Film Festival, Panic Fest, and Telluride Horror Show.
