= Marília (disambiguation) =

Marília is a Brazilian municipality in the state of São Paulo.

Marília or Marilia may also refer to:

== People ==
First name

- Marília Amaral (born 1999), Brazilian politician
- Marilia Andrés Casares (born 1974), Spanish singer-songwriter
- Marília Gabriela (born 1948), Brazilian journalist, actress, singer, television presenter and writer
- Marilia Gomes (born 1982), Brazilian artistic gymnast
- Marília Mendonça (1995-2021), Brazilian singer and composer
- Marília Pêra (1943–2015), Brazilian actress
- Marilia Rocha (born 1978), Brazilian filmmaker

Nickname

- Reginaldo de Santana (born 1975), better known as Marilia, Brazilian footballer

== Sports clubs ==
- Marília Atlético Clube, Brazilian football club
- Marília Futebol Clube, Brazilian football club

== Other uses ==
- Marilia (insect), an insect genus
- Marília Airport, Brazilian airport
- Marília de Dirceu, poetry book by Tomás António Gonzaga
- Marília Formation, geological formation in Brazil
- Diário de Marília, Brazilian newspaper
- TAM Aviação Executiva (Táxi Aéreo Marília), Brazilian airline
