= Two Shots Fired =

2014 film

- Film poster
- Directed by: Martín Rejtman
- Written by: Martín Rejtman
- Release date: 11 August 2014 (Locarno)
- Running time: 104 minutes
- Country: Argentina
- Language: Spanish

Two Shots Fired (Spanish: Dos disparos) is a 2014 Argentine drama film written and directed by Martín Rejtman. It was selected to be screened in the Contemporary World Cinema section at the 2014 Toronto International Film Festival.

== Plot ==
After a night spent clubbing, young man Mariano finds a gun in the toolshed and shoots himself once in the head and once in the stomach, surviving with minor injuries. At the same time, the family dog disappears. Mariano's mother Susana is concerned for his welfare and presses his brother Ezequiel to look after him. Mariano moves in with his brother, then discovers that when he plays the recorder the bullet inside him causes harmonic sounds, causing his chamber music quartet to fall apart. Ezequiel starts a casual romance with Ana, who has been breaking up with her boyfriend for two years. Susana takes sleeping pills and does not wake up for 72 hours, so her psychologist advises a holiday. She goes to the beach with Mariano's music teacher and another woman, Liliana, who then invites her husband and his new partner along as well. Returning from the beach, Susana sees a dog which thinks might be the family's dog.

== Cast ==
- Susana Pampin as Susana
- Rafael Federman as Mariano
- Laura Paredes as Margarita
- Benjamín Coehlo as Ezequiel
- Camila Fabri as Ana
- Daniela Pal as Liliana
- Manuela Martelli as Lucía

== Production ==
Two Shots Fired was writer/director Martín Rejtman's first feature film in ten years. The film used an ensemble cast and was mostly composed of fixed shots. He commented that whilst his previous feature films concentrated on teenagers (Rapado), twenty-year-olds (Silvia Prieto) and thirty-year-olds (The Magic Gloves), in Two Shots Fired there are characters of all different ages.

== Critical reception ==
The New York Times review described Two Shots Fired as "droll" and Variety commented that it was "predictably unpredictable".
