= Rosario Bléfari =

Argentine actress, singer, and poet (1965–2020)

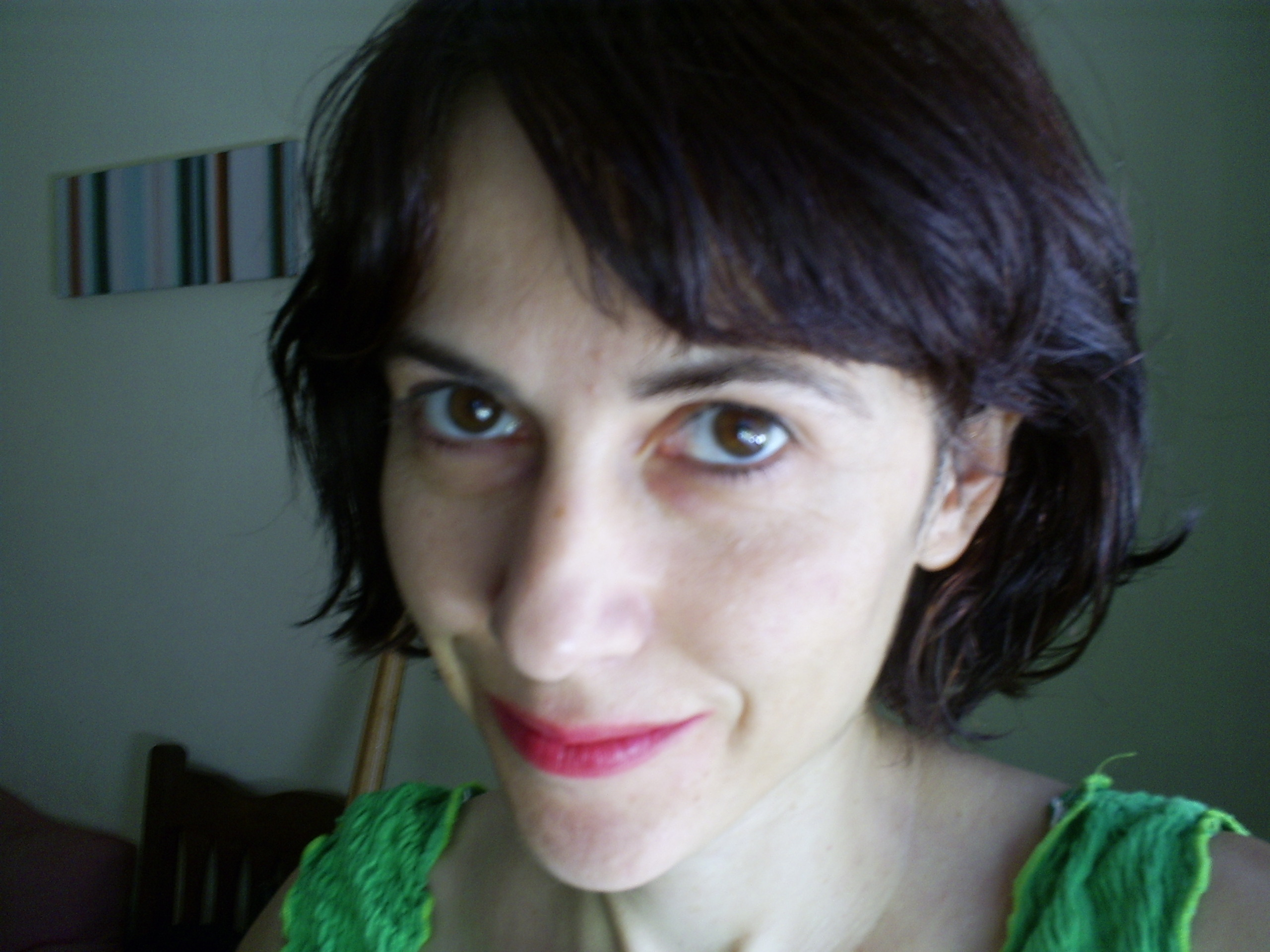
- Bléfari in 2008
- Pronunciation: Spanish pronunciation: [roˈsaɾjo βʟeˈfari]
- Born: 24 December 1965; Mar del Plata, Buenos Aires, Argentina
- Died: 6 July 2020 (aged 54); Santa Rosa, La Pampa, Argentina
- Burial place: Santa Rosa, La Pampa, Argentina
- Occupations: Singer-songwriter; actress; writer
- Years active: 1978–2020
- Notable work: Río Paraná; Silvia Prieto

Rosario Bléfari (Spanish pronunciation: [roˈsaɾjo βʟeˈfari]; 24 December 1965 – 6 July 2020) was an Argentine singer-songwriter, actress, and poet, widely considered an emblematic figure of Argentine independent music and cinema.

== Life and work ==
She was born in Mar del Plata, Argentina.

From 1989 to 2001 she led the lo-fi indie rock band Suárez. By their fourth and final album Excursiones they moved towards a more indie pop sound and even achieved a mainstream hit with Río Parana.

After the dissolution of Suárez Rosario embarked on her solo career, which was generally characterized by a more acoustic and melodic sound than her work with Suárez, while still conserving punk and noise elements, and staying faithful to her DIY ethic.

In the 2010s she formed the band Sue Mon Mont and the duo Los Mundos Posibles, with younger collaborators from indie bands like Él Mató a un Policía Motorizado, Los Reyes del Falsete, and Mi Pequeña Muerte.

As an actress, she is most identified with her roles in Martín Rejtman's early films: the short Doli vuelve a casa (1986), and the features Rapado (1992), and especially Silvia Prieto (1999). She also appeared in Poor Butterfly (1986), I, the Worst of All (1990), Los dueños (2013) and The Idea of a Lake (2016).

Bléfari died on 6 July 2020 from leukaemia-related problems at a hospital in Santa Rosa, Argentina at the age of 54.

== Discography ==
=== Suárez ===
№	Name / Date
1	Hora de no ver (1994)
2	Horrible (1995)
3	Galope (1996)
4	Excursiones (1999)
5	29:09:00 (EP, 2000)
6	La colección (compilation, 2005)

=== Solo ===
№	Name / Date
1	Cara (2002)
2	Estaciones (2004)
3	Misterio relámpago (2006)
4	Versiones relámpago (EP, 2006)
5	Calendario (2008)
6	Privilegio (2011)
7	Brazos en Huelga (EP, 2017)
8	Sector apagado (2019)

=== Sue Mon Mont ===
№	Name / Date
1	Sue Mon Mont (2014)
2	Contratiempo (EP, 2015)

=== Los mundos posibles ===
№	Name / Date
1	Pintura de guerra (2018)

=== Splits ===
№	Name / Date
1	4 Women No Cry (2005)

== Filmography ==
=== Movies ===
- Pobre mariposa (1986)
- Doli vuelve a casa (1986)
- Color escondido (1988)
- Lo que vendrá (1988)
- Yo, la peor de todas (1990)
- Urgente (1990)
- Vértigos (1993)
- 1000 boomerangs (1995)
- Rapado (1996)
- Silvia Prieto (1998)
- Hotel, hotel (2002)
- Urgente (2006)
- La señal (2007)
- Un mundo misterioso (2011)
- Verano (2011)
- Los dueños (2013)
- The Idea of a Lake (2016)
- Adiós, entusiasmo (2017)
- Planta permanente (2019)

=== Documentaries ===
- Cenando con Suárez (1999)
- Historias de Argentina en vivo (2001)
- Entre dos luces: Suárez. Primera parte (2015)
- Cien caminos: Suárez. Segunda parte (2018)
- El arte musical | Rosario Bléfari y banda (2020)

== Literary works ==
=== Stories ===
- Mis ejemplos (2016)
- Las reuniones (2018)

=== Poems ===
- Poemas en prosa (2001)
- La música equivocada (2009)
- Antes del río (2016)
- Poemas de los 20 en los 80 (2019)
- Diario de dinero (2020)

=== Theater ===
- Somos nuestro cerebro (2003)
- Somos nuestros genes (2005)
