= Camila Fabbri =

Argentine writer, playwright and actress

Camila Fabbri (born 1989) is an Argentine writer, playwright and actress.

== Career ==
Camila Fabbri was born 1989 in Buenos Aires. She studied at the Escuela de Arte Dramático and her first play (Brick) won a competition in 2010. A second play, Mi primer Hiroshima was performed in 2012. Fabbri was nominated for a Silver Condor for her role in the 2014 Martín Rejtman film Two Shots Fired. She has also appeared in Verónica Chen's High Tide.

Fabbri made her debut as a writer in 2015 with the short story collection Los accidentes in 2015. Her second book was the non-fiction novel El día que apagaron la luz about the República Cromañón nightclub fire, followed by another short story anthology entitled Estamos a salvo. In 2021, she was named by Granta magazine as one of the best writers under the age of 35 in the Spanish language. Two other Argentine writers were also listed: Martín Felipe Castagnet and Michel Nieva.
