= Diego Olivera =

Argentine actor (born 1968)

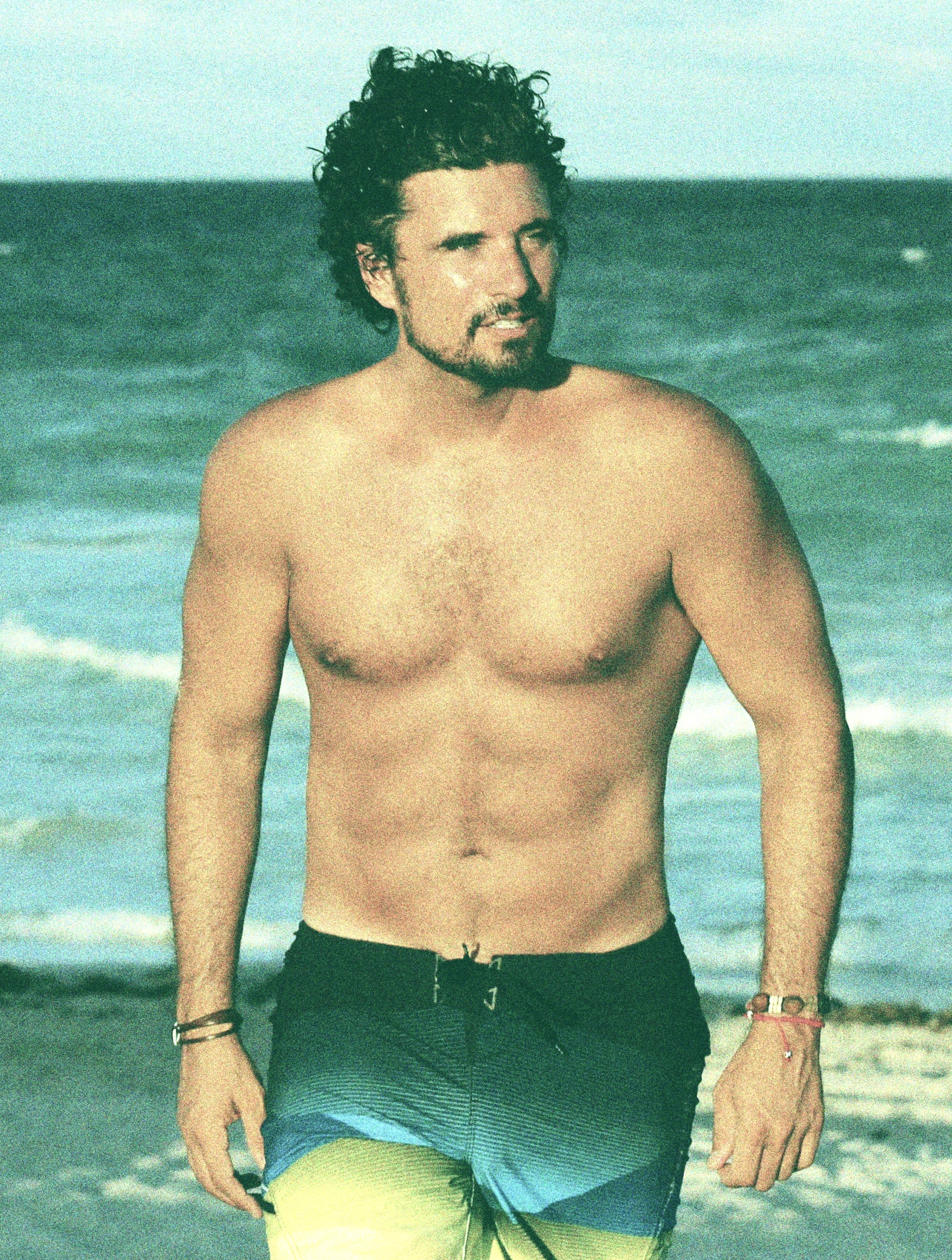
- Born: Diego Olivera; February 7, 1968 (age 58); Buenos Aires, Argentina
- Spouse: Mónica Ayos (m. 2002)
- Children: 2
- Relatives: Federico Olivera (brother); Soledad Villamil (sister-in-law); Violeta Olivera (niece); Clara Olivera (niece)

Diego Olivera (born February 7, 1968) is an Argentine actor known for his work in telenovelas in Argentina and Mexico.

== Career ==
Olivera began his acting career at the age of 12 in the play Street Scene at the Teatro San Martín. He studied theater with Alejandra Boero, Carlos Gandolfo, and Héctor Bidonde. He gained recognition as a teenager for his role as Darío in the Argentine television series Montaña rusa.

Expanding his career, Olivera participated in musical theater productions such as La Bella y la Bestia and 101 dálmatas. He also acted in children’s productions, including Tom Sawyer and Cantame un cuento. Over the years, he played various roles in television dramas and telenovelas.

In 2006, while working on La Ley del Amor for Telefe, he was cast in Montecristo in Mexico, produced by TV Azteca. His performance was well received in Argentina. He later starred in Vivir por ti in Mexico City and returned to Argentina to play the antagonist Lautaro Ledesma in Herencia de amor.

Olivera continued his career in Mexico, playing Father Juan Pablo in Triunfo del amor and the main antagonist José Luis Falcón in Mentir para vivir. The latter concluded after 101 episodes due to low ratings. He has since appeared in numerous Mexican telenovelas, often portraying antagonists.

In film, he appeared in Los guantes mágicos and Ningún amor es perfecto.

== Personal life ==
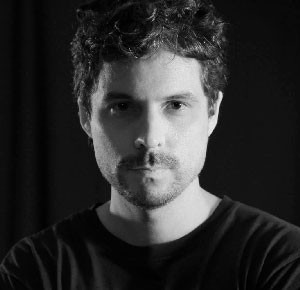
Federico Olivera

Olivera is the brother of actor Federico Olivera. He is married to actress Mónica Ayos, with whom he has a daughter, Victoria. He is also the stepfather of Ayos’s son, Federico, from a previous marriage.

== Filmography ==
=== Theater ===
- Street Scene
- Tom Sawyer
- La Bella y la Bestia
- 101 dálmatas
- Confesiones
- Bingo

=== Television ===
- 90 60 90 Modelos
- Alta Comedia
- Ricos y famosos
- Montaña rusa
- Mi Cuñado
- Un Millón
- Dr. Amor
- La Feve Petite
- Felipe
- Floricienta
- Amarte así
- Se dice amor
- Montecristo – Santiago Díaz Herrera
- Vivir por ti
- Herencia de amor – Lautaro Ledesma
- Alguien que me quiera – Bautista
- Triunfo del Amor – Father Juan Pablo Iturbide Montejo (2010-2011)
- Amorcito Corazón – Fernando Lobo Carvajal (2011-2012)
- Mentir para Vivir – José Luis Falcón / Francisco Castro / Sandro Carvajal (2013)
- Hasta el fin del mundo – Armando Romero (2014-2015)
- Lo imperdonable – Jeronimo del Villar (2015)
- Corazón que miente – Leonardo del Rio (2016)
- Nuestra Belleza Latina 2016 – Celebrity guest
- Mujeres de negro – Patricio Bernal (2016)
- En tierras salvajes – Anibal Otero Rivelles (2017)
- Y mañana será otro día – Camilo Sarmiento Bedolla (2018)
- Vencer el pasado – Lucio Tinoco (2021)
- Corazón guerrero – Augusto Ruiz Montalvo (2022)
- Nadie como tú – José María Figueroa Arce (2023)
- Sed de venganza – Eugenio Beltrán (2024)
- Corazón de oro – Eugenio (2026)

=== Film ===
- The Magic Gloves – Luis (directed by Martín Rejtman)
- Ningún amor es perfecto – with Patricia Sosa

== Awards and nominations ==
Year	Award	Category	Telenovela	Result
2014	TVyNovelas Awards	Best Male Antagonist	Mentir para vivir	Nominated
2017	TVyNovelas Awards	Best Co-star	Corazón que miente	Nominated
2017	TVyNovelas Awards	Best Actor in Series	Mujeres de negro	Won
