= Leila Bordreuil =

French-American experimental musician

Leila Bordreuil (born 1990) is a French-American cellist and experimental composer of noise music and free jazz, known for site-specific compositions in non-typical venues, unusual amplification, and her extensive use of dissonance, feedback, white noise, and improvisation. She has composed for film and stage as well as for live performance, and describes herself as philosophically aligned with the spectralist school of composition, focused on the physical properties of sounds and how they are made.

== Career ==
Born in 1990 to an American mother and French father, Bordreuil lived in both Brooklyn and Aix-en-Provence as a child. She first became interested in avant-garde music in high school, after discovering the work of Pierre Schaeffer at her local library, and began going to raves and techno concerts while still a teenager in Aix; on one occasion, to a rave her parents (a sociologist and an anthropologist) were observing for research. Bordreuil studied electronic music at Bard College, where her tutors included Marina Rosenfeld and Richard Teitelbaum.

Bordreuil has a hand tremor, which affects her cello technique. Her first solo album was Headflush, in 2019.

In 2018 she played a concert at the Smart Museum of Art to accompany an exhibition on The History of Perception, and the same year was commissioned by the Lincoln Center to provide a new live musical accompaniment to a screening of the silent film The Seashell and the Clergyman, by the early French director Germaine Dulac. In 2019 she was one of the artists involved in Kris Verdonck's SOMETHING (out of nothing), and in 2020 composed the soundtrack to Jorge Thielen Armand's film La Fortaleza. In 2021, she collaborated on a piece for BBC Radio 3 with sound artist Kate Carr: the session was remote, and the two artists had never met.

She performed at Le Guess Who? in 2019. She was a Jerome Foundation Hill Artist Fellow in Music in 2022–23, and undertook a Camargo Foundation residency in the summer of 2025, conducting a project exploring the resonance of spaces in medieval French abbeys. In 2024 she accompanied Laurel Halo for a performance of Halo's ATLAS, and in 2026 she appeared at the Sonic Acts Biennial alongside Drew McDowall.

=== Musical philosophy ===
Bordreuil describes her work as emerging from the spectral music mode of compositional practice pioneered by Gérard Grisey, who she cites as an inspiration; she further developed her practice while working with the Romanian spectralist Iancu Dumitrescu.

The church of St Théodule, where Bordreuil and Kali Malone recorded Music for Intersecting Planes.

In interviews, Bordreuil has discussed her preference for composing pieces that are designed specifically for a particular venue and amplification setup: she is interested in the variety of "stories that can be told" solely through choice of equipment and location. The Skinny characterised her music as having "a preoccupation with space", and the New Yorker singled out her use of "amplification, spatialization and unorthodox playing techniques".

Jennifer Allan Lucy wrote in The Quietus that "the environment drives the playing" on her 2021 album not an elegy (recorded in Ralph Avenue subway station and including the sounds of trains and commuters), and HHV Mag judged Music for Intersecting Planes, recorded in the sanctuary of a church in La Tour-de-Peilz, to be "a recording in which space, instrument and environment become equally audible".

=== Critical reception ===
Multiple critics have commented on Bordreuil's preoccupation with the physical processes of making and hearing music. Robert Barry described her as belonging to a school of musicians "as interested in both the air making their sounds and the air through which their sounds move as they are in the sounds themselves", while the New York Times described her work as "interrogat[ing] how the body interacts with sound". Danish critic Nikola Nedeljkovic Gøttsche called her "[one] of contemporary music's most uncompromising material thinkers". Bordreuil herself commented in one interview that "même si tu n’aimes pas ma musique, tu la ressens quand même" ("even if you don't like my music, you still feel it".)

One review of The Caustic Ballads noted how often the sounds were reminiscent of synths despite that album being fully acoustic; Bernie Brooks' review of Music for Intersecting Planes noted that despite the only actual instruments present being the cello and the organ, the sounds to him resembled many others, especially the flute. Other reviewers highlighted her use of improvisation and dissonance, commenting on her "disorienting whorls of improvised sound" and "long and corrosive atonalities". Robert Barry described her as "wield[ing] white noise like a chef wields a knife".

Brooks perceived a throughline in Bordreuil's work of "assessing disaster through sound", noting that 1991, Summer, Huntingdon Garage Fire and not an elegy are both responses to traumatic events of different scales, respectively a house fire and the COVID-19 pandemic. Kristof van Baarle cited Bordreuil's soundtrack to the 2019 experimental theatre piece SOMETHING (out of nothing), about climate change, as "affirm[ing] and fuel[ing] this dynamic towards an end-state of being". During the 2020 COVID lockdowns - when Bordreuil had been scheduled to be in Brussels - the Brussels Centre for Fine Arts instead hosted Bordreuil and filmmaker Bayley Sweitzer for an online performance themed around "the value of air".
