= El Father Plays Himself =

- Poster
- Directed by: Mo Scarpelli
- Produced by: Manon Ardisson; Rodrigo Michelangeli; Edward Power; Gordon Annie; Justin Madhany; Bart van den Broek; Zane Dawood; Joe Torres; Phoebe Hall
- Starring: Jorge Roque Thielen H. Jorge Thielen Armand
- Cinematography: Mo Scarpelli
- Edited by: Juan Soto
- Production companies: Ardimages UK; La Faena Films; Rake Films; Channel 6 Media
- Release date: 2020
- Countries: Venezuela; United Kingdom; Italy; United States
- Language: Spanish

El Father Plays Himself is a 2020 documentary film filmed and directed by Mo Scarpelli. It premiered at the 51st Visions du Réel. It is a co-production between Venezuela, United Kingdom, Italy and the United States, the film premiered at the 51st Visions du Réel. It follows the filming of La Fortaleza, a feature about a son who goes back to his native country to tell the story of his father, who at the same time plays the main character in the film.

== Plot ==
Jorge Thielen Armand is a young filmmaker who left Venezuela, his home country, when he was 15 years old. Years later, as an adult in 2019, he decided to go back, specifically to the Amazon jungle, with the only goal of telling the story of his father in a deeply personal film. Jorge Roque Thielen, the director's father, plays himself in the feature.

In the movie it is easily perceived that fiction and reality intertwine. The theme of El Father Plays Himself shows an act of love and ambition that transforms into a difficult process during the filming, which forces both father and son to face their past and make peace with it. In the words of the director, “it is the clash of fear and love”.

== Cast ==
- Jorge Roque Thielen H.
- Jorge Thielen Armand

== Reception ==
Sheri Linden of The Hollywood Reporter wrote that El Father Plays Himself was "a tantalizing house of mirrors" and Emiliano Granada of Variety expressed that he found it "a deeply human portrayal". Joshua Brunsting of Criterion Cast said: "there’s a lyricism and poetry to the filmmaking, allowing for viewers to become completely immersed into Scarpelli’s rumination on filmmaking, family and loss... Sincerely one of the best films of 2020".

Additionally, it received the Special Mention at the 51st edition of Visions du Réel, at the Perso Film Festival, and at the 22nd edition of the Lucania Film Festival. It was in the IDFA Best of Festivals Selection and was the Opening Night Film at the Cucalorus Film Festival. It was also the 2020 Torino Film Lab Audience Design Fund winner.

== Awards and nominations ==
Award	Category	Recipient(s)	Result	References
Málaga Film Festival	Silver Biznaga Prize for Best Director	Mo Scarpelli	Winner	
Bogotá Film Festival	Best Film About Art	Mo Scarpelli	Winner	
Festival del Cine Venezolano	Best Cinematography	Mo Scarpelli	Winner	
Festival del Cine Venezolano	Best Director of Photography	Mo Scarpelli	Winner	
Garden Route International Film Festival	Best Direction Prize	Mo Scarpelli	Winner	
Garden Route International Film Festival	Best Actor/Character Prize	Jorge Thielen Armand	Winner	
Doc Alliance Selection 2020	Doc Alliance Selection Award	Mo Scarpelli	Winner	
