= Jorge Thielen Armand =

Venezuelan film director (born 1990)

- Armand at the American Film Institute's 2026 Latin Film Festival.
- Born: 1990 (age 35–36); Caracas, Venezuela
- Education: Concordia University
- Occupations: Film director, producer and screenwriter
- Years active: 2012 - present

Jorge Thielen Armand (born 1990, in Caracas) is a Venezuelan-Canadian film director, screenwriter and producer. He studied communication at Concordia University in Montreal, and later, with Rodrigo Michelangeli, founded the Canadian-Venezuelan film production company La Faena Films. He has directed three feature films, La Soledad, La Fortaleza, and Death Has No Master, as well as the short films Pasta Negra and Flor de la Mar. All films have received positive reviews from critics.

== Biography ==
Armand's first feature film, La Soledad (English: The Solitude), premiered in the 73º Venice International Film Festival receiving the Jury Prize in Biarritz and the Audience Award for Best Film in the Miami Film Festival, followed by other accolades around the world.

His second feature film, La Fortaleza (English: Fortitude), premiered in the Tiger Competition of the International Film Festival Rotterdam and was later screened at international film festivals, including Busan, Cairo, Guadalajara, Gijon, among others. It was awarded the Jury Prize in Biarritz by the French film theorist Nicole Brenez. He received additional awards in Rome and Caracas.

In 2021, Armand received the Guggenheim Foundation Fellowship, becoming the first Venezuelan filmmaker to obtain this recognition.

In 2022, Armand participated at the Rockefeller Foundation Bellagio Residency to develop Death Has No Master (Spanish: La Muerte No Tiene Dueño). In 2026 the film premiered at the Cannes Film Festival in the Directors' Fortnight section. It was later selected as Venezuela's official submission to the 99th Academy Awards.

== Filmography ==
Feature films
| Year | Title | Credited as | | | | Notes |
| Year | Title | Director | Producer | Writer | Actor | Notes |
|---|---|---|---|---|---|---|
| 2016 | La Soledad | Yes | Yes | Yes | No | Feature directorial debut - Co-written with Rodrigo Michelangeli |
| 2020 | Fortitude (La Fortaleza) | Yes | Yes | Yes | No | Co-written with Rodrigo Michelangeli |
| 2020 | El Father Plays Himself (El Father Como Sí Mismo) | No | No | No | Yes | Documentary directed by Mo Scarpelli on the filming of La Fortaleza |
| 2026 | Death Has No Master (La Muerte no Tiene Dueño) | Yes | Yes | Yes | No | Starring Asia Argento |

Short films
| Year | Title | Credited as | | | | Notes |
| Year | Title | Director | Producer | Writer | Actor | Notes |
|---|---|---|---|---|---|---|
| 2014 | Ráfagas de Paz | No | Yes | No | No | Directed by Rodrigo Michelangeli |
| 2015 | Flor de la Mar | Yes | Yes | Yes | No | |
| 2020 | De Memoria y Escombros | No | Yes | No | No | Directed by Rodrigo Michelangeli |
| 2025 | Pasta Negra | Yes | Yes | Yes | No | Co-written with Mo Scarpelli. Based on the short story Tijeras by Karina Sainz Borgo. |
