= Montecristo (2006 Mexican TV series) =

Spanish-language telenovela

- Also known as: El Amor Nunca Muere
- Created by: Marcelo Camaño, Adriana Lorenzón, Bethel Flores
- Starring: Silvia Navarro; Diego Olivera; Omar Germenos
- Theme music composer: David Bolzoni
- Opening theme: "Yo soy aquél" and "Hazme" by David Bolzoni
- Country of origin: Mexico
- Original language: Spanish
- No. of episodes: 185

Production
- Executive producers: Rita Fusaro, Emilia Lamothe
- Producer: Martin Luna
- Camera setup: Multi-camera
- Running time: 60 minutes
- Production company: TV Azteca

Original release
- Network: Azteca Trece
- Release: August 14, 2006 – April 27, 2007

Montecristo is a Spanish-language telenovela that aired on TV Azteca. It premiered on August 14, 2006. The final original episode aired April 27, 2007. It is based on the 2006 Argentine telenovela of the same name, with Rita Fusaro, one of the producers of the original version, serving as the producer in this version.

== Story ==
Montecristo is the story of Santiago Diaz Herrera (Diego Olivera), a young man who apparently seems to have it all: love, a future, family, success. Life has been kind to him, the doors of the whole world are opened to him. But the treachery of those around him will turn everything into hell.

Santiago, the son of an outstanding national judge, has just been appointed secretary of the court. He has plans to marry Laura, the woman of his dreams.

Santiago feels a great devotion for law; but he also loves fencing, a passion he shares with Marcos Lombardo (Omar Germenos), his close friend. The story begins when Santiago and Marcos travel to Morocco to take part in a fencing tournament. However, this trip will not lead him to victory but to sheer disgrace since he will be involved in a terrible act of treachery, plotted by a wicked environment.

Some days before setting off, Santiago receives some tragic news; his father, Horacio Diaz Herrera (José Alonso), discovers that Alberto Lombardo (Marcos' father) has committed a very serious crime during the times of the military regime in Mexico for which he will be arrested and taken to court. Santiago gets so distressed by this terrible news that he decides not to say a word to Marcos. But he doesn't take into account Luciano's envious essence, a man that had unsuccessfully tried to get Santiago's position, and who is fully convinced that the judge, his superior, has helped his son reach his post at court. Alberto Lombardo (Fernando Lujan), a man trained to do evil, asks his son Marcos to get rid of Santiago while they are in Europe, as he will do the same with Horacio in Mexico.

Almost immediately, Judge Herrera dies in a terrible accident caused by Leandro, Laura's uncle (Santiago's fiancée) and Alberto's accomplice. He also plots a setup to involve Santiago in his father's death. For this reason, Santiago is arrested in Morocco, accused of a crime he has not committed. Marcos returns from Europe alone and makes Laura believe that Santiago has killed a man. Laura (Silvia Navarro) gets desperate and tries by all means to travel to Morocco but she is told that Santiago has been killed in jail. Laura falls into a terrible depression and decides to put an end to her life. But she also finds out that she is expecting a baby from Santiago. Feeling devastated and totally at a loss, she agrees to marry Marcos, who has always loved her in silence.

In the meantime, in a far-off jail in Morocco, Santiago meets Ulises (Alfredo Sevilla), an old art dealer that has been in prison for many years. Ulises helps Santiago recover. Together, they discover Marcos' treachery. From then on, Santiago has only one thing on mind: to take revenge on those who have snatched his happiness and life.

== Cast and characters ==
- Silvia Navarro as Laura Ledezma
- Diego Olivera as Santiago Díaz Herrera
- Omar Germenos as Marcos Lombardo Riverol
- Fernando Luján as Alberto Lombardo Gutiérrez
- Maria Reneé Prudencio as Regina Pointer Arciniegas
- José Alonso as Horacio Díaz Herrera Guzmán
- Julieta Egurrola as Sara Calleja
- Margarita Sanz as Leticia Riverol De Lombardo
- Luis Felipe Tovar as Ramón
- Álvaro Guerrero as Leandro
- Leticia Huijara as Dolores "Lola" Carreño
- Pedro Sicard as Luciano Manzur
- Carmen Delgado as Helena
- Sophie Alexander as Mariana
- Tania Arredondo as Milena Salcedo
- Francisco Balzeta as Detective
- Sebastián Ferrat as Camilo
- Michelle Garfías
- Carlos Hays as Matías Lombardo Ledezma / Matías Díaz Herrera Ledezma
- Víctor Hugo Martín as León Rocamora
- Raúl Ortíz as Doctor
- María Fernanda Quiroz as Érika
- Manuel Sevilla as Petricio Tamargo
- René Gatica as Padre Pedro
- Lisset as Diana/Lorena
- Sergio de Bustamante as Andrés
- Erika de la Rosa as Valentina Lombardo Riverol
- Lola Merino as Lysi Savoy
- Enrique Muñoz as Clementi
- Ana Karina Guevara as Ana Medina
- Julia Urbini as Rias Lombardo Riverol
- Rodolfo Almada as Jaime
- Hernán Mendoza
- Fernando Sarfatti as Juan
- Edna Necoechea
- Carmen Madrid as Mercedes Cortés

== Syndication ==
- ntv7 (August 8, 2008 to May 2009)
