= Mentir para Vivir =

Mexican telenovela

- Also known as: Sobrevivir a ti
- Genre: Telenovela
- Created by: Maria Zarattini
- Written by: Juan Carlos Tejeda; Claudia Velazco
- Directed by: Benjamín Cann; Rodrigo H.G. Zaunbos
- Starring: Mayrín Villanueva; David Zepeda; Diego Olivera; Altair Jarabo
- Theme music composer: Alberto Olmedo
- Opening theme: "Déjame soñar" by Ricardo Montaner and India Martínez
- Ending theme: "Volverte a enamorar" by David Zepeda
- Country of origin: Mexico
- Original language: Spanish
- No. of seasons: 1
- No. of episodes: 101 (list of episodes)

Production
- Executive producer: Rosy Ocampo
- Producers: María Alba Espinosa; Eduardo Meza
- Production locations: Mexico City, Mexico; Hermosillo, Sonora, Mexico
- Cinematography: Manuel Ángel Barajas; Daniel Ferrer; Alejandro Álvarez Cisneros
- Editor: Alfredo Juárez
- Running time: 41-44 minutes (1-100); 120 minutes (101)
- Production company: Televisa

Original release
- Network: Canal de las Estrellas
- Release: June 3 – October 20, 2013

Mentir para vivir (English: Life of Lies) is a Mexican telenovela produced by Rosy Ocampo for Televisa. It aired on Canal de las Estrellas from June 3, 2013 to October 20, 2013.

The telenovela stars Mayrín Villanueva, David Zepeda, Altair Jarabo, Leticia Perdigón, and Diego Olivera.

In the United States the telenovela aired on Univision from October 7, 2013 to February 28, 2014.

== Plot ==
Oriana Caligaris (Mayrín Villanueva) and José Luis Falcón (Diego Olivera) are a Mexican couple who lives in Colombia with their six years old daughter, Alina (Ana Paula Martinez).

José Luis works in Colombian customs. One day, he confesses to Oriana about his involvement in a smuggling operation, and that the earnings are deposited into an account opened in Oriana's name but without her consent. For this, Jose told Oriana that the police is searching for them.

Disappointed and out of fear, Oriana escapes to Mexico with her daughter Alina, to find her dear friend, Raquel (Altair Jarabo), who along with Lucina (Cecilia Gabriela) own the hotel "El Descanso" in San Carlos, Sonora. Raquel decided to keep Oriana and her daughter in their hotel for the few days they would be staying. While in the hotel José Luis calls the hotel to look for Oriana only for Lucina to tell him no one by the name Oriana stays there. José Luis supposedly died in a chase with police only for its a ruse to trick the authorities.

Among the hotel guests is Don Gabriel Sánchez (Alejandro Tommasi), an old friend of Lucina. Gabriel is a partner at a major spinning and weaving factory located in Hermosillo, Sonora. He is a widow that is remarried to Lila (Lourdes Munguia), an ambitious woman that is twenty years younger than him. Lila has a brother, Berto (Ferdinando Valencia), who is a playboy.

One afternoon while Don Gabriel was relaxing at the hotel, Alina saw a gun by the beach while she was playing. The gun was dropped by some drunk guys the previous day. While Alina tried to show Gabriel the gun, she accidentally shot him in the chest. Gabriel falls dead. On hearing the shot, Oriana runs and sees his daughter with a gun. Out of fear and in a bid to protect them, Raquel and Lucina send Oriana and Alina to Guaymas, Sonora.

When Ricardo (David Zepeda) arrives in San Carlos to collect the body of his father and initiate investigations, it was reported that the main suspect of the crime is a young woman who is accompanied by her young daughter.

Few days after the shooting, Anas Valdivia (Laisha Wilkins), a strange, depressed and lonely young woman checked into the hotel, and drowned herself. Always-clever Lucina takes the opportunity to pass on Anas' identification, thus making Oriana impersonate Anas. This is to clear Oriana of her involvement in the murder of Don Gabriel. Though this was against Oriana's will, but she accepted because she has no choice but to 'Lie to Live'.

Living as Anas, Oriana worked in a cloth store, starting her life all over. She also changed Alina's name to Catalina and explained why she changed their names - so that they won't be separated.

Few weeks after, Mrs. Paloma Aresti (Adriana Roel), Ricardo's godmother and a wealthy woman who is in search of her only grandchild and heir, hired a private investigator, who went by the hotel to search for Anas Valdivia. an investigator sent by who is looking for her only grandchild and heir, whom she does not know: Inés Valdivia. Again timely, Lucina, knowing what she had done with Anas' identity, led the investigator to Oriana, painting her to be the 'likely' granddaughter of the wealthy old woman. She also told the investigator that she saw a little girl with the supposed Anas. Lucina then gives the investigator Oriana' picture, telling him it's Anas. Lucina also gives a brush with a lock of Anas' hair and advised a DNA test.

Eventually, Anas (Oriana) is located by Paloma, who takes her to live with her. There, Oriana meets Ricardo. Oriana then becomes a partner in Paloma's spinning and weaving factory.

Gabriel's son, Ricardo (David Zepeda) is a successful engineer who has a and rebellious teenager Sebastián (Alejandro Speitzer).

The attraction between Oriana and Ricardo is immediate without imagining that there are among them many obstacles and adversities secrets to be overcome. Circumstances further complicate when José Luis who in reality is not dead comes back to Mexico determined to get his family and fight in a game of lies and truths, in which love will triumph in the end.

== Cast ==
=== Main cast ===
- Mayrín Villanueva as Oriana Caligaris/Inés Valdivia
- David Zepeda as Ricardo Sánchez Bretón
- Diego Olivera as José Luis Falcón
- Altair Jarabo as Raquel Ledesma

=== Supporting cast ===
- Adriana Roel as Paloma Aresti de Camargo
- Leticia Perdigón as Matilde Aresti de Camargo
- Cecilia Gabriela as Lucina González
- Nuria Bages as Fidelia Bretón
- Lourdes Munguía as Lila Martín de Sánchez
- Ferdinando Valencia as Berto Martín
- Joaquín Cosío as Joaquín Barragán
- Luis Gatica as Samuel Barragán
- Juan Carlos Barreto as Rubén Camargo
- Fabián Robles as Piero Verástegui
- Felipe Nájera as Padre Mariano
- Patricio Castillo as Homero de la Garza
- Osvaldo de León as Leonardo Olvera de la Garza
- Luis Fernando Peña as Eliseo
- Geraldine Galván as Fabiola Camargo Aresti
- Lucas Velázquez as César Camargo Aresti
- Alejandro Speitzer as Sebastián Sánchez Bretón
- Ana Paula Martínez as Alina Falcón Caligaris
- Alberto Agnesi as Antonio Araujo
- Mariluz Bermúdez as Marilú Tapia
- Manuel Guízar as Benigno Jiménez
- Mariana Garza as María Jiménez
- Joana Brito as Nadia
- María Prado as Elvira
- Claudia Ortega as Berenice
- Ignacio Guadalupe as Manolo
- José Montini as Teniente Carmelo Hernández
- Juan Romanca as Celio
- Manuel Raviela as Felipe
- Pablo Valentín as Comandante Alejandro Lazcano
- Teo Tapia as Patrick Ontiveros
- Toño Infante as Armando
- Uriel del Toro as Pedro
- Benjamín Islas as Ceferino
- Claudio Roca as Bonifacio
- Leandro Castello as John
- Leonardo Cappi as Federico
- Libia Regalado as Chelito
- Wiebaldo López as Obispo
- Rosita Bouchot as Perla
- Ricardo Vera as Porfirio
- Fernanda Ruizos as Trabajadora Social
- Veticeyva Vielma as Lupe
- Aurora Clavel as Eduviges
- Germán Gutiérrez as Ezequiel Santos
- Erik Guecha as Jorge
- Ignacio Casano as Mike Rodríguez
- Rafael del Villar as Lic. Julio Manrique
- Raymundo Capetillo as Edmundo Valencia
- Francisco Avendaño as Veterinario
- Reneé Varsi as Dra. Marylin Lomelí
- Juan Sahagún as Enrique Escalona
- Beatriz Moreno as Rosa Toscano
- Héctor Sáez as Dr. Mario Veronese

=== Special participation ===
- Erik Díaz as Ricardo
- Lorena Velázquez as Señora Carmona
- Kika Edgar as Young Celeste Flores
- Alejandro Tommasi as Gabriel Sánchez Fernández
- Laisha Wilkins as Inés Valdivia Aresti
- Dulce María as Joaquina "Jackie" Barragán
- Queta Lavat as Mercedes

== Production ==
Mentir para vivir, itself the fourth name, was previously known as La Sustituta, Oriana, and Mentiras de verdad. Production of Mentir para vivir officially started on March 4, 2013.

== Awards and nominations ==
Year	Award	Category	Nominated	Result
2014	TVyNovelas Awards	Best Telenovela	Mentir para Vivir	Nominated
2014	TVyNovelas Awards	Best screenplay or adaptation	Mentir para Vivir	Nominated
2014	TVyNovelas Awards	Telenovela Platform	Mentir para Vivir	Nominated
2014	TVyNovelas Awards	Best Lead Actress	Mayrin Villanueva	Nominated
2014	TVyNovelas Awards	Best Lead Actor	David Zepeda	Nominated
2014	TVyNovelas Awards	Best Antagonist Actress	Altair Jarabo	Nominated
2014	TVyNovelas Awards	Best Antagonist Actor	Diego Olivera	Nominated
2014	TVyNovelas Awards	Best Leading Actor	Patricio Castillo	Nominated
2014	TVyNovelas Awards	Best Young Actor	Alejandro Speitzer	Won
2014	TVyNovelas Awards	Best Co-lead Actress	Cecilia Gabriela	Nominated
2014	TVyNovelas Awards	Best Co-lead Actor	Felipe Najera	Won
2014	TVyNovelas Awards	Best Supporting Actress	Leticia Perdigón	Nominated
2014	TVyNovelas Awards	Best Supporting Actor	Juan Carlos Barreto	Nominated
2014	TVyNovelas Awards	Best Stage Manager	Benjamin Cann and Rodrigo Saunbos	Won
