= List of Mentir para Vivir episodes =

Mentir para vivir (Life of Lies; dubbed as Lie So You Can Live by Univision) is a Mexican telenovela produced by Rosy Ocampo for Televisa. The telenovela is written by Maria Zarattini, who last wrote La Fuerza del Destino.

== Episodes ==
Air Date	Number	Episode Title	Rating	Duration
June 3, 2013	001	Terrible accidente	18.9	48 minutes
June 4, 2013	002	Búsqueda de Ricardo	19.0	47 minutes
June 5, 2013	003	Robo de identidad	18.3	47 minutes
June 6, 2013	004	Cerca de la heredera	17.8	48 minutes
June 7, 2013	005	Paloma encuentra a Inés	17.7	47 minutes
June 10, 2013	006	Recorrido por la fábrica	17.8	45 minutes
June 11, 2013	007	Tito perdido	18.3	45 minutes
June 12, 2013	008	Raquel visita a Inés	18.7	44 minutes
June 13, 2013	009	El pasado de Inés	17.9	44 minutes
June 14, 2013	010	Cambio en el testamento	16.8	44 minutes
June 17, 2013	011	Las intenciones de Ricardo	16.8	44 minutes
June 18, 2013	012	Inicio de relación	17.4	42 minutes
June 19, 2013	013	Inicio de relación	17.3	44 minutes
June 20, 2013	014	Paloma sufre una embolia	17.0	44 minutes
June 21, 2013	015	Compromiso	17.0	44 minutes
June 24, 2013	016	Matilde en su lugar	15.2	44 minutes
June 25, 2013	017	Formalizar su relación	15.5	42 minutes
June 26, 2013	018	María desaparece de nuevo	16.2	44 minutes
June 27, 2013	019	María reacciona agresivamente	16.0	43 minutes
June 28, 2013	020	El dueño de El Descanso	15.9	44 minutes
July 1, 2013	021	Suite para Fransisco Caso	14.2	45 minutes
July 2, 2013	022	Berto interesado en Inés	15.2	44 minutes
July 3, 2013	023	Flores de José Luis	15.4	44 minutes
July 4, 2013	024	Raquel conoce a José Luis	15.9	44 minutes
July 5, 2013	025	José Luis espía a Oriana	15.4	44 minutes
July 8, 2013	026	Alina se lastima	16.1	43 minutes
July 9, 2013	027	La llamada de José Luis	15.7	43 minutes
July 10, 2013	028	Pecado carnal	14.7	44 minutes
July 11, 2013	029	Antonio inconforme	15.2	44 minutes
July 12, 2013	030	Enemigo en común	15.3	44 minutes
July 15, 2013	031	Pregunta directa	15.6	44 minutes
July 16, 2013	032	Oriana confiesa la verdad sobre Francisco	15.8	43 minutes
July 17, 2013	033	El cumpleaños de Alina	16.8	44 minutes
July 18, 2013	034	Amante de José Luis	16.6	43 minutes
July 19, 2013	035	Rubén advierte a Ricardo	15.5	43 minutes
July 22, 2013	036	Severa discusión	15.1	43 minutes
July 23, 2013	037	Recuperar a su familia	16.2	44 minutes
July 24, 2013	038	Respuesta sorpresiva	15.1	44 minutes
July 25, 2013	039	Paloma se entera de la verdad	16.0	43 minutes
July 26, 2013	040	Quiere a su nieta de regreso	14.8	42 minutes
July 29, 2013	041	Roban las pistolas	15.0	43 minutes
July 30, 2013	042	Comienzan los chantajes	14.6	43 minutes
July 31, 2013	043	Recuperar las pistolas	15.6	43 minutes
August 1, 2013	044	Oferta tentadora de Paloma	15.6	44 minutes
August 2, 2013	045	Perro pateado	13.8	43 minutes
August 5, 2013	046	Lucina tiene miedo	14.6	43 minutes
August 6, 2013	047	Oriana huye con Alina	14.8	44 minutes
August 7, 2013	048	Fabiola embarazada	15.0	42 minutes
August 8, 2013	049	La informante	15.6	43 minutes
August 9, 2013	050	Intento de suicidio	15.2	43 minutes
August 12, 2013	051	La operación de María	16.4	43 minutes
August 13, 2013	052	La advertencia de Joaquín	15.6	43 minutes
August 14, 2013	053	Paloma abre su corazón	15.4	43 minutes
August 15, 2013	054	El regalo de José Luis	15.2	43 minutes
August 16, 2013	055	Lucina golpea a Raquel	14.8	42 minutes
August 19, 2013	056	El deseo de María	16.1	42 minutes
August 20, 2013	057	Fiesta de Fabiola	16.5	43 minutes
August 21, 2013	058	La confesión de Oriana	16.5	43 minutes
August 22, 2013	059	Paloma corre a Matilde	16.6	43 minutes
August 23, 2013	060	Sacrificio de Oriana	14.6	43 minutes
August 26, 2013	061	Matrimonio falso	15.3	43 minutes
August 27, 2013	062	Oriana sufre un accidente	15.7	43 minutes
August 28, 2013	063	Situación riesgosa	16.4	43 minutes
August 29, 2013	064	Oriana recae	16.7	43 minutes
August 30, 2013	065	Ricardo se casa y Oriana mejora	15.5	43 minutes
September 2, 2013	066	Marilú desconcertada	15.3	45 minutes
September 3, 2013	067	Sebastián en peligro	16.2	46 minutes
September 4, 2013	068	Alina en adopción	16.2	45 minutes
September 5, 2013	069	Motivos de adopción	16.7	43 minutes
September 6, 2013	070	Patria potestad	15.7	42 minutes
September 9, 2013	071	Sebastián tiene VIH	18.3	43 minutes
September 10, 2013	072	Ricardo más celoso que nunca	17.0	43 minutes
September 11, 2013	073	Sinceridad de Mariano	17.3	42 minutes
September 12, 2013	074	Raquel embarazada	17.0	42 minutes
September 13, 2013	075	Vídeo perdido	16.2	43 minutes
September 16, 2013	076	Ricardo secuestrado	15.9	43 minutes
September 17, 2013	077	Muerte fingida	17.6	43 minutes
September 18, 2013	078	Marilú inconforme	18.2	43 minutes
September 19, 2013	079	Negación de Marilú	18.2	42 minutes
September 20, 2013	080	Oriana visita al Juez	16.4	43 minutes
September 23, 2013	081	Marilú no cederá	18.2	43 minutes
September 24, 2013	082	Casa hogar para Alina	18.8	43 minutes
September 25, 2013	083	Ricardo acuerda con Marilú	18.2	43 minutes
September 26, 2013	084	Alina en el orfanatorio	18.1	43 minutes
September 27, 2013	085	Alina tiene anemia	16.4	43 minutes
September 30, 2013	086	Oriana sale de la cárcel	17.1	42 minutes
October 1, 2013	087	Propuesta a Sebastián	18.2	43 minutes
October 2, 2013	088	Levantan orden de restricción	16.7	43 minutes
October 3, 2013	089	Jackie se lastima	17.0	43 minutes
October 4, 2013	090	Vídeo como prueba	16.3	42 minutes
October 7, 2013	091	Oriana embarazada	17.8	43 minutes
October 8, 2013	092	Ricardo herido	18.5	43 minutes
October 9, 2013	093	Bebé muerto	18.4	41 minutes
October 10, 2013	094	Oriana y Alina corren peligro	18.7	43 minutes
October 11, 2013	095	Lucina interrumpe	16.5	42 minutes
October 14, 2013	096	Solicitud del disco compacto	17.4	42 minutes
October 15, 2013	097	Samuel le dispara a Mariano	17.5	42 minutes
October 16, 2013	098	Sebastián es hijo de Piero	18.8	42 minutes
October 17, 2013	099	Deseo de Jackie	19.6	41 minutes
October 18, 2013	100	Advertencia de Ricardo	17.2	40 minutes
October 20, 2013	101	Mentir para vivir Final Capítulo 101; Mentir para vivir Final Capítulo 102	18.8	49 minutes 30 minutes
