= Shakti (2019 film) =

- Promotional poster
- Directed by: Martín Rejtman
- Written by: Martín Rejtman
- Produced by: Florencia Larrea; Victoria Marotta; Jerónimo Quevedo
- Starring: Ignacio Solmonese; Laura Visconti; Susana Pampín
- Cinematography: Federico Lastra
- Edited by: Andrés Medina
- Release date: 9 February 2019
- Running time: 19 min.
- Countries: Argentina; Chile
- Language: Spanish

Shakti is a 2019 Argentine-Chilean short film written and directed by Martín Rejtman. The film premiered at the 69th Berlin International Film Festival on 9 February 2019, where it was nominated for best short film. It was Rejtman's first short film project in over thirty years.

== Plot summary ==
Fede, is in his mid-twenties and lives alone in a Buenos Aires apartment. He splits up with his girlfriend, Magda on the say that his grandmother dies. He then meets a new love interest, Shakti and invites her to dinner. Rejtman explained that the film is about "a Jewish young man, the death of his grandmother, depression, Hare Krishnas, Pesach (Passover), and potato knishes."

== Cast ==
- Ignacio Solmonese as Fede
- Laura Visconti as Shakti
- Susana Pampín as Fede's psychologist
- Valentina Posleman as Magda
- Pablo Moseinco as Padre Fede
- Emma Luisa Rivero as Delia
- Patricio Penna as Ulises
- Miel Bargman as female client at psychologist's practice
- Alejandra Flechner as Beatriz
