= María Fernanda Quiroz =

Mexican actress (born 1986)

- Born: María Fernanda Quiroz Gil; 25 August 1986 (age 39); Mexico City, Distrito Federal, Mexico
- Occupation: Actress

María Fernanda Quiroz Gil (born 25 August 1986), also known as Ferka, is a Mexican actress and television personality.

== Life and career ==
Born in Mexico City, Quiroz studied acting at the Centro de Estudios y Formación Actoral of TV Azteca. She made her professional debut in 2006, in Montecristo, and from then she appeared in several telenovelas. In 2015, she was a contestant in the reality show La Isla, a Mexican version of Celebrity Survivor.

== Selected filmography ==
- Montecristo (2006)
- Se Busca Un Hombre (2007)
- Pasión morena (2009)
- Quererte así (2012)
- Destino (2013)
- Las Bravo (2014)

=== Reality shows ===
Year	Title	Result	Rank
2015	La Isla: El reality	14th eliminated	5.º
2016	La Isla, el Reality: La Revancha	14th eliminated	8.º
2020	Guerreros 2020	6th eliminated	32.º
2022	Inseparables: amor al límite 3	Winner	1.º
2022	Las Estrellas Bailan en Hoy: Campeón de Campeones	3rd place	3.º
2023	La casa de los famosos México	3rd eliminated	12.º
2024	MasterChef Celebrity México	Runner-up	2.º/3.º
