= The Dead Man and Being Happy =

- Film poster
- Spanish: El muerto y ser feliz
- Directed by: Javier Rebollo
- Written by: Lola Mayo; Javier Rebollo; Salvador Roselli
- Produced by: José Nolla; Lola Mayo; Damián París; Luis Miñarro
- Starring: José Sacristán; Roxana Blanco; Valeria Alonso; Jorge Jellinek; Carlos Lecuona; Lisa Caligaris; Vicky Peña; Fermí Reixach
- Cinematography: Santiago Racaj
- Edited by: Ángel Hdez. Zoido
- Production companies: Eddie Saeta; Icónica; Lolita Films; Noodles Productions; Utópica
- Distributed by: Splendor Films (es)
- Release dates: 23 September 2012 (Zinemaldia); 11 January 2013 (Spain); 13 November 2014 (Argentina)
- Countries: Spain; France; Argentina
- Language: Spanish

The Dead Man and Being Happy (Spanish: El muerto y ser feliz) is a 2012 road movie directed by Javier Rebollo and written by Lola Mayo, Rebollo, and Salvador Roselli which stars José Sacristán and Roxana Blanco. It is a Spanish-French-Argentine co-production.

== Plot ==
The plot follows Santos, a terminally-ill Spanish hitman living in Argentina who starts a travel to the north of the country for a last job.

== Cast ==
- José Sacristán as Santos
- Roxana Blanco as Érika
- Valeria Alonso
- Jorge Jellinek
- Carlos Lecuona
- Lisa Caligaris as Alejandra
- Vicky Peña
- Fermí Reixach as Santiago

== Production ==
The film is a Spanish-Argentine-French co-production by Eddie Saeta, Icónica, Lolita Films, Noodles Productions and Utópica and it had the participation of TVC and backing from ICEC, INCAA, and SOFICA.

== Release ==
The film was presented at the 60th San Sebastián International Film Festival on 23 September 2012. Distributed by Catalan outfit Splendor Films, it was released theatrically in Spain on 11 January 2013.

== Reception ==
Neil Young of The Hollywood Reporter wrote that Rebollo "just about manages to keep the right side of the line dividing the engagingly offbeat from the self-regardingly clever-clever".

Fionnula of Halligan ScreenDaily undercored that "rarely laugh-out-loud, The Dead Man And Being Happy is nonetheless a warmly funny film".

Matthew Connolly of Slant Magazine wrote that the film "feels like a connect-the-dots film with a few lines artfully blurred".

Sergio F. Pinilla of Cinemanía rated the film 4 out of 5 stars, deeming it to be "one of the most exciting and radical adventures of recent Spanish cinema".

Javier Porta Fouz of La Nación gave the film a 'good' rating, pointing out that even its intrigue becomes progressively diluted, by the time the denouement comes viewers confirm that "the characters have been guided with a strange sense of humor and responsibility, with a welcome affection".

Gaspar Zimerman of Clarín gave the film a 'good' rating, writing that Sacristán "manages to give shape to a credible and lovable creature".

Carlos Boyero of El País only recognized one virtue in the film, being "that it only lasts 90 minutes".

== Accolades ==
| Year | Award | Category | Nominee(s) | Result | Ref. |
|---|---|---|---|---|---|
| 2012 | 60th San Sebastián International Film Festival | Silver Shell for Best Actor | José Sacristán | Won | |
| 2012 | Toulouse Spanish Film Festival | Golden Violet for Best Film | | Won | |
| 2013 | 27th Goya Awards | Best Actor | José Sacristán | Won | |

== See also ==
- List of Spanish films of 2013
- List of Argentine films of 2014
