= Roxana Blanco =

Uruguayan actress (born 1967)

- Born: 6 November 1967 (age 58); Montevideo, Uruguay
- Education: Margarita Xirgu Multidisciplinary School of Dramatic Art
- Occupation: Actress
- Awards: Florencio Award (1992, 1994, 2002)

Roxana Blanco (born 6 November 1967) is a Uruguayan actress. She is a graduate of the Margarita Xirgu Multidisciplinary School of Dramatic Art.

== Biography ==
Roxana Blanco is the sister of playwright Sergio Blanco. She took acting and singing classes at the Multidisciplinary School of Dramatic Art, where she graduated in the early 1990s. Since then she has developed a prolific theater career, which has earned her the Florencio Award three times. In 2012, she joined the cast of the Comedia Nacional, of which she remains a member.

At the same time, she has developed an important film and television career that has given her international recognition and multiple awards. She has participated in films of great recognition in her country and abroad, such as Artigas: La Redota by César Charlone, The Delay by Rodrigo Plá, and El muerto y ser feliz by Javier Rebollo.

For her leading role in Alma Mater by Álvaro Buela, she won the best actress award at the Biarritz Film Festival (France) in 2005. She received this again in 2012 for her work in The Delay.

Blanco has participated in more than twenty plays, representing texts by prominent figures of world theater. In 2009, she starred opposite Alejandra Wolff, Jenny Galván, and Andrea Davidovics in the television series Las Novias de Travolta, based on the theatrical work she had previously starred in.

== Theater ==
- Dream of Autumn by Jon Fosse
- Las novias de Travolta by Andrés Tulipano
- El lector por horas by José Sanchis Sinisterra
- Proof by David Auburn
- La Sangre by Sergi Belbel
- Three Tall Women by Edward Albee
- Agatha by Marguerite Duras
- Central Park West by Woody Allen
- Macbeth by William Shakespeare
- Frida by Ricardo Halac
- Cyrano de Bergerac by Edmond Rostand
- Last of the Red Hot Lovers by Neil Simon
- Roberto Zucco by Bernard-Marie Koltès
- Querido lobo by Roger Vitrac
- Richard III by William Shakespeare
- Toda nudez será castigada by Nelson Rodrigues
- Doña Rosita the Spinster by Federico García Lorca
- The Trojan Women by Euripides
- Cabaret by John Kander and Fred Ebb
- Tango by Sławomir Mrożek

=== With the Comedia Nacional ===
- Oresteia by Aeschylus
- Terrorism by the Presnyakov brothers
- Molly Sweeney by Brian Friel
- La mitad de Dios by Gabriel Calderón
- El tiempo todo entero by Romina Paula
- The Visit by Friedrich Dürrenmatt

== Film ==
- El muerto y ser feliz by Javier Rebollo
- El sexo de las madres by Alejandra Marino
- The Delay by Rodrigo Plá
- Artigas: La Redota by César Charlone
- Nochebuena by Camila Loboguerrero
- Matar a todos by Esteban Schroeder
- Alma Mater by Álvaro Buela
- 9 by Martín Barrenechea & Nicolás Branca

== Awards ==
=== International ===
- Biarritz Film Festival: Grand Prize for Female Performance (Alma Mater) and Best Actress (The Delay)
- Milan Film Festival: Special Jury Prize (Alma Mater)
- Havana Film Festival: Best Actress Award (Alma Mater)
- Ourense Film Festival: Best Actress Award (Matar a todos)
- Syracuse International Festival: Special Mention (Matar a todos)
- Costa Rica Festival: Best Actress (The Delay)
- Catalonia Festival: Best Actress (The Delay)
- Toulouse Festival: Best Actress (El muerto y ser feliz)

=== National ===
- Florencio Award for performance (Menú de cuentos), Best Supporting Actress (Terrorism, Roberto Zucco), and Best Leading Actress (Agatha, La travesía)
- Parcum Prize awarded by the Mercosur Cultural Parliament to one of the ten outstanding personalities of Uruguayan culture
- Award of the Film Critics Association of Uruguay for Best Film Actress (The Delay)
- Morosoli Award (Alma Mater)
- Fripesci Award for Film Performance and Best Film Actress (Alma Mater)
- Iris Award (Alma Mater and El lector por horas)
- Woman of the Year Award (Alma Mater, Matar a todos, The Delay)
