= Fortitude (2020 film) =

2020 Venezuelan film

- Poster
- Spanish: La Fortaleza
- Directed by: Jorge Thielen Armand
- Written by: Jorge Thielen Armand; Rodrigo Michelangeli
- Produced by: Rodrigo Michelangeli; Manon Ardisson; Jorge Thielen Armand; Rodolfo Cova; Zach Lebeau; Kim Jackson
- Starring: Jorge Roque Thielen H.; Carlos "Fagua" Medina; Yoni Naranjo; Leudys Naranjo
- Cinematography: Rodrigo Michelangeli
- Edited by: Felipe Guerrero
- Music by: Leila Bordreuil
- Production companies: La Faena Films, Mutokino, Viking Film, In Vivo Films, Breaker, Ardimages UK, Genuino Films
- Release dates: January 23, 2020 (IFFR); December 23, 2021 (Venezuela)
- Countries: Venezuela; Colombia; France; Netherlands; Canada
- Language: Spanish

Fortitude (Spanish: La Fortaleza) is a 2020 drama film directed by Jorge Thielen Armand. It premiered in the Tiger Competition of the 49th International Film Festival Rotterdam. A co-production between Venezuela, Colombia, France and The Netherlands, the film premiered in Venezuelan cinemas on 23 December 2021.

== Plot ==
La Fortaleza is inspired by the real life story of the filmmaker's father, Jorge Roque Thielen, who in turn plays the main character. It is noted that the film oscillates between fiction and reality. Roque, the protagonist, dives into the jungle to escape from his alcoholism, his demons and the social and economic crisis in Venezuela. However, the meeting with old friends and the promises of gold at a work in a mine divert his desire for redemption and he enters a vicious circle of violence around mining. This will make him sink in a cycle that devours his interior. In that moment, he will need the fortitude to emerge from the darkness and walk toward a new beginning.

== Cast ==
- Jorge Roque Thielen H.
- Carlos "Fagua" Medina
- Yoni Naranjo
- Leudys Naranjo

== Reception ==
La Fortaleza received a favorable critical response following its premiere at the International Film Festival Rotterdam. In Screen International, Wendy Ide called it a bold and distinctive feature and praised Jorge Roque Thielen's lead performance, describing the film as a nervy, feverish character study. Jordan Cronk of Film Comment described it as a solemn tale of exile and redemption, and Sergio Monsalve of El Nacional situated it among Venezuela's strongest recent cinema. Several critics noted the film's blend of documentary and fiction: Kaleem Aftab of Cineuropa highlighted director Jorge Thielen Armand's focus on character over plot, and Cédric Lépine of Fiches du Cinéma wrote that its documentary-style camerawork created an unsettling atmosphere. Writing for Desistfilm, Pablo Gamba praised the film's exploration of how crisis affects those who live through it, while noting that the connection between the protagonist's personal struggles and Venezuela's broader crisis remains underdeveloped in the film. At the 2020 Biarritz Amérique-Latine festival, the film received the Jury Prize from a panel led by film historian Nicole Brenez.

== Awards and nominations ==
Award	Category	Recipient(s)	Result	References
Festival Biarritz Amérique-Latine	Jury Prize	Jorge Thielen Armand	Won	
Festival de la Crítica Cinematográfica de Caracas	Best Film	Jorge Thielen Armand	Won	
Festival de la Crítica Cinematográfica de Caracas	Best Director	Jorge Thielen Armand	Won	
Festival de la Crítica Cinematográfica de Caracas	Best Cinematography	Rodrigo Michelangeli	Won	
Academy of Motion Picture Arts and Sciences of Venezuela	Best Actor	Jorge Roque Thielen H.	Won	
Festival del Cine Venezolano	Best Supporting Actor	Yoni Naranjo	Won	
Cinema Tropical Awards	Best Latin American Film of the Year	Jorge Thielen Armand	Nominated	
Directors Guild of Canada	DGC Discovery Award	Jorge Thielen Armand	Nominated	
