= The Delay =

2012 film

- Promotional release poster
- Directed by: Rodrigo Plá
- Written by: Laura Santullo
- Starring: Roxana Blanco
- Cinematography: María Secco
- Release dates: 10 February 2012 (Berlin); 1 June 2012 (Uruguay)
- Running time: 84 minutes
- Country: Uruguay
- Language: Spanish

The Delay (Spanish: La demora) is a 2012 Uruguayan drama film directed by Rodrigo Plá. The film was selected as the Uruguayan entry for the Best Foreign Language Oscar at the 85th Academy Awards, but it did not make the final shortlist.

== Cast ==
- Roxana Blanco as María
- Carlos Vallarino as Agustin
- Oscar Pernas as Nestor
- Cecilia Baranda
- Thiago Segovia
- Facundo Segovia

== See also ==
- List of submissions to the 85th Academy Awards for Best Foreign Language Film
- List of Uruguayan submissions for the Academy Award for Best Foreign Language Film
