= Death Has No Master =

2026 thriller film by Jorge Thielen Armand

- Film poster
- Spanish: La muerte no tiene dueño
- Directed by: Jorge Thielen Armand
- Written by: Jorge Thielen Armand
- Produced by: Stefano Centini; Arantza Maldonado; Jorge Thielen Armand
- Starring: Asia Argento; Dogreika Tovar; Jorge Thielen Hedderich
- Cinematography: Luis Armando Arteaga
- Edited by: Felipe Guerrero
- Music by: Vittorio Giampietro
- Production companies: La Faena; Faits Divers Média; Volos Films; Deal Productions
- Release date: 20 May 2026 (Cannes)
- Running time: 104 minutes
- Countries: Venezuela; Canada; Italy; Luxembourg
- Languages: Spanish; Italian

Death Has No Master (Spanish: La muerte no tiene dueño) is a 2026 psychological thriller film written and directed by Jorge Thielen Armand. A co-production of Venezuela, Canada, Italy, and Luxembourg, it stars Asia Argento as a woman who ventures to Venezuela to sell her late father's cacao plantation.

The film had its world premiere in the Directors' Fortnight section of the 2026 Cannes Film Festival on 20 May. It was also selected as the Venezuelan entry for the Best International Feature Film at the 99th Academy Awards.

== Synopsis ==
Caro travels to Venezuela to sell her late father’s cacao plantation, only to find the family mansion occupied by its former staff, who are determined to remain at all costs. As Caro takes justice into her own hands to claim the inheritance she believes is hers, she sets off a struggle that unearths the violence buried in the land and its memory.

== Cast ==
- Asia Argento as Caro
- Jorge Thielen Hedderich as Roque
- Dogreika Tovar as Sonia

== Production ==
In June 2024, the project received a €200,000 production grant from Film Fund Luxembourg. It participated at the Venice Gap-Financing Market in August 2024. It won the Laser Film Post Production Award at the When East Meets West Co-Production Forum, receiving color grading and Digital Cinema Package services.

In August 2024, it was announced that Paz Vega was cast in the leading role. In February 2026, Asia Argento would portray Caro, replacing Vega due to undisclosed reasons.

== Release ==
Death Has No Master had its world premiere at the Directors' Fortnight section of the 2026 Cannes Film Festival on 20 May. In February 2026, it was reported that Lucky Number had acquired the film's international sales rights. At the 79th Locarno Film Festival, it was presented in the Piazza Grande section in connection with a lifetime achievement award given to Asia Argento. It was later selected for the 2026 Fantastic Fest.

The Canadian distributor h264 will handle distribution in Quebec.

== Reception ==
=== Critical response ===
Death Has No Master received mostly positive reviews from critics after its premiere in the 2026 Cannes Film Festival. On review aggregator Rotten Tomatoes, the film holds an approval rating of 81% based on 16 reviews, with an average rating of 6.9/10. Writing for IndieWire, David Katz called it an impressive and politically adroit genre work. Isaac Feldberg of RogerEbert.com praised it as an ominous, entrancing postcolonial giallo, and Italian cult magazine Nocturno rated it 4.5 out of 5 stars. Sight & Sound's Lou Thomas and Cineuropas Olivia Popp both highlighted its engrossing atmosphere and intense sound design, and several other outlets, including DMovies, Filmuforia, MediaPart, Cinecittà News, and Le Polyester, gave positive notices, with multiple critics singling out Dogreika Tovar's performance.

Other reviews were mixed, with critics for Gazettely, The Film Verdict, Next Best Picture, and Argentina's Otros Cines and Micropsia praising the film's craft while finding its central character underwritten or its pacing uneven. The Hollywood Reporters Leslie Felperin and Screen Internationals Wendy Ide were more critical, both finding the film atmospherically accomplished but narratively unsatisfying,

=== Awards ===
At the 2026 Reelworld Film Festival, the film won the award for Outstanding Feature Film, and Luis Armando Arteaga won the award for Outstanding Feature Film Cinematography.

== See also ==
- List of submissions to the 99th Academy Awards for Best International Feature Film
- List of Venezuelan submissions for the Academy Award for Best International Feature Film
