= Diário de Marília =

Brazilian newspaper

The Diário de Marília (English: Diary of Marilia) is a Brazilian newspaper based in Marília, São Paulo, Brazil, which covers news about the city. The paper traces its origins to 1935.
