= The Magic Gloves =

- Argentine promotional poster
- Directed by: Martín Rejtman
- Written by: Martín Rejtman
- Produced by: Natacha Cervi; Hernán Musaluppi; Diego Peskins; Martín Rejtman; Daniel Andres Werner
- Starring: Vicentico; Valeria Bertuccelli; Diego Olivera; Susana Pampín; Cecilia Biagini
- Cinematography: José Luis García
- Edited by: Rosario Suárez
- Music by: Vicentico
- Release date: 27 May 2004
- Running time: 85 min.
- Country: Argentina
- Language: Spanish

The Magic Gloves (Spanish: Los guantes mágicos) is a 2003 Argentine comedy-drama film directed by Martín Rejtman. The film stars Vicentico, Valeria Bertuccelli, Diego Olivera, Fabián Arenillas, Cecilia Biagini and Susana Pampín. The film premiered at the Locarno Film Festival on 12 August 2003, followed by a premiere on 8 September at the 2003 Toronto International Film Festival. It received a theatrical release in Argentina on 27 May 2004.

== Plot summary ==
Alejandro (Vicentico), a cab driver, and his girlfriend Cecilia are in the middle of a breakup when they are taken in by a social group led by a domineering married couple, Sergio (Fabián Arenillas) and Susana (Susana Pampín). Alejandro temporarily leaves his job as a cab driver to join a plastic glove investment with Sergio and Sergio’s brother Luis, a porn actor who has been working in Canada.

== Reception ==
Writing for The Village Voice, J. Hoberman praised the film; "The Magic Gloves is a city symphony in which the metropolis seems an illusory maze and the melody is based on a refrain of recurring riffs." Dan Sallitt writing in Senses of Cinema wrote that "The Magic Gloves pushes the deadpan style of Spanish comedy so far that the abstraction comes out the other end."

== Cast ==
- Vicentico as Alejandro
- Valeria Bertuccelli as Valeria
- Fabián Arenillas as Sergio
- Cecilia Biagini as Cecilia
- Susana Pampín as Susana
- Diego Olivera as Luis
- Leonardo Azamor as Daniel
- Pietr Krysav as Hugh
- Denis Lukin as Kevin
- Yelena Goreyeva as Laura
- Darío Levy as Otorrinolaringólogo
