= Leonardo Martinelli =

Brazilian film director, screenwriter, producer

- Born: 16 May 1998 (age 27); Rio de Janeiro, Brazil
- Occupation: Filmmaker
- Years active: 2017–present

Leonardo Martinelli (born 16 May 1998) is a Brazilian film director, screenwriter and producer. His short film Fantasma Neon (2021) received international acclaim, winning the Golden Leopard for Best International Short Film at the Locarno Film Festival. His subsequent works, Pássaro Memória (2023) and Samba Infinito (2025), were selected for major international festivals, including the Festival de Cannes, Locarno Film Festival, TIFF, San Sebastián, BFI London, Clermont-Ferrand, among others.

Martinelli’s work often explores themes of labor, urban life, and contemporary Brazilian culture through bold visual style and rhythmic storytelling.
