= Silvia Prieto =

1999 film by Martín Rejtman

- Theatrical release poster
- Directed by: Martín Rejtman
- Written by: Martín Rejtman
- Produced by: Martín Rejtman; Anahí Berneri; Mónica Bolan; Sandra Flomenbaum; Fernando Moledo; María Ntaca; Samuel Oliva; Ana Petierbarg; Nicolás León Tannchen; Paula Zyngierman
- Starring: Rosario Bléfari; Valeria Bertuccelli; Gabriel Fernández Capello; Marcelo Zanelli; Susana Pampín; Luis Mancini; Mirta Busnelli
- Cinematography: Paula Grandio
- Edited by: Gustavo Codella
- Music by: Gabriel Fernández Capello
- Production company: R/M Films
- Distributed by: Buena Vista International
- Release dates: 16 February 1999 (Berlin); 27 May 1999 (Argentina)
- Running time: 92 minutes
- Country: Argentina
- Language: Spanish

Silvia Prieto is a 1999 Argentine comedy-drama film written and directed by Martín Rejtman. The film stars Rosario Bléfari, Valeria Bertuccelli, Gabriel Fernández Capello, Marcelo Zanelli, Susana Pampín, Luis Mancini and Mirta Busnelli. The musical score was composed by Capello.

In 2022, it was selected as the ninth greatest film of Argentine cinema in a poll organized in 2022 by the specialized magazines La vida útil, Taipei and La tierra quema, which was presented at the Mar del Plata International Film Festival.

== Cast ==
- Rosario Bléfari as Silvia Prieto
- Valeria Bertuccelli as Brite
- Marcelo Zanelli as Marcelo Echegoyen, Silvia's ex-husband
- Gabriel Fernández Capello as Gabriel Rossi, Brite's ex-husband and a poet who recently moved back from Los Angeles
- Luis Mancini as Mario Garbuglia, a recent contestant on a dating show
- Susana Pampín as Marta, Brite's masseuse and a recent contestant on a dating show
- Mirta Busnelli as the other Silvia Prieto
- Mario Rubinacci as the Italian man
- Gabo Correa as Devi, Silvia's weed dealer
- Abian Vain as Walter
