= Alejandro Landes =

Director and screenwriter (born 1980)

Alejandro Landes Echavarría
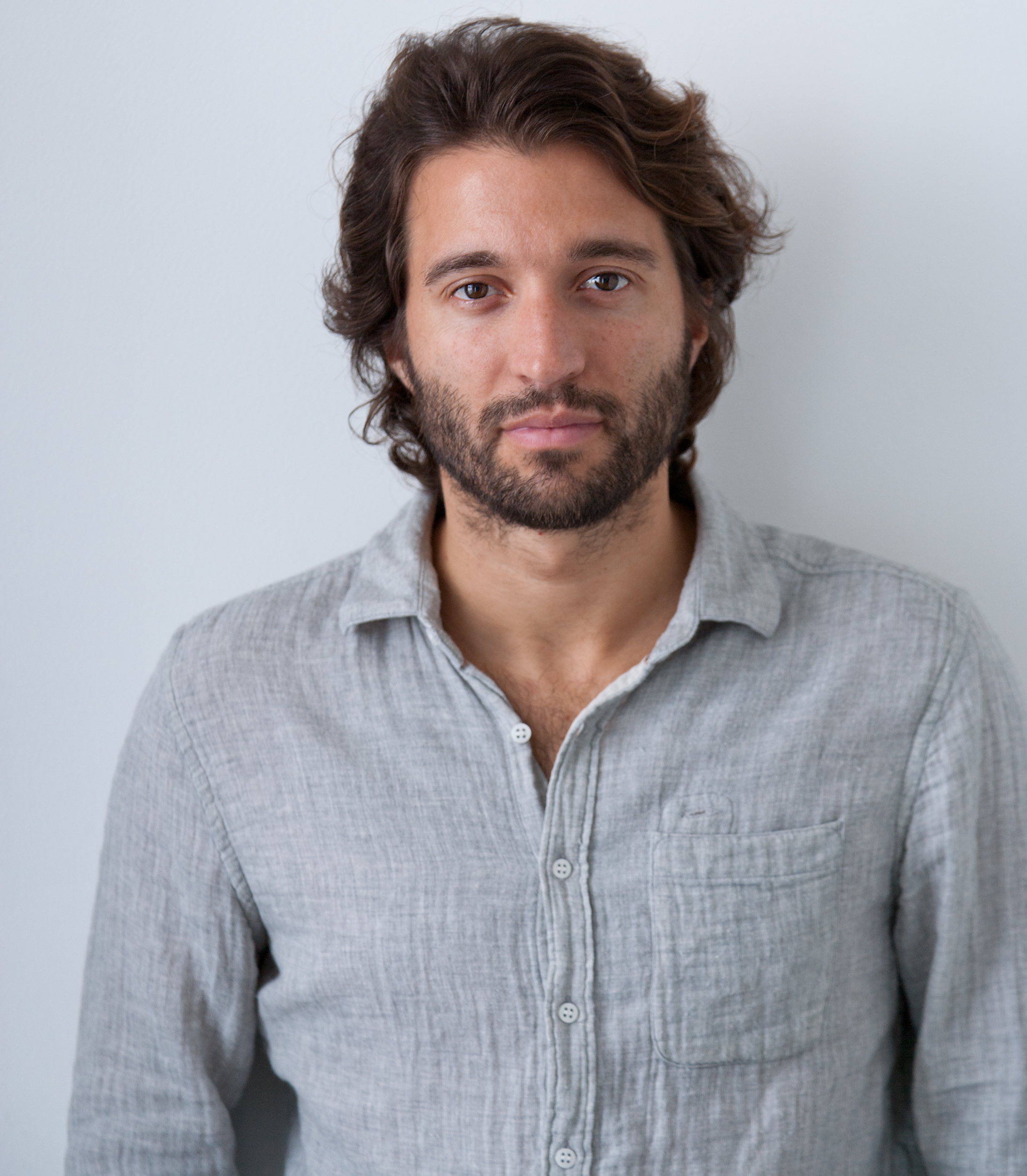
- Landes Echavarría at the 2012 Miami International Film Festival showing of Porfirio
- Born: Alejandro Landes Echavarría; 1980 (age 45–46); São Paulo, Brazil
- Occupations: Film director, producer; screenwriter; journalist

Alejandro Landes Echavarría (born 1980) is a Colombian-Ecuadorian film director, producer, screenwriter, and journalist. He is mainly known for directing Spanish-language films such as Porfirio, a Colombian drama that was based on a true story, and the documentary Cocalero about Evo Morales's successful presidential campaign in Bolivia.

== Biography ==
Landes Echavarría was born in São Paulo, Brazil to a Colombian mother and Ecuadorian father. Landes Echavarría received a B.A. in Political Economy from Brown University in 2003.

Prior to becoming a filmmaker, Landes Echavarría worked as an assistant producer for Oppenheimer Presenta, a weekly news broadcast show. He also wrote for the Miami Herald.

Landes Echavarría's first film, Cocalero, premiered at the 2007 Sundance Film Festival. His second feature, Porfirio, premiered in the Quinzaine des Réalisateurs at the 2011 Cannes Film Festival.

In 2015 the work on his home, which he named "Casa Bahia", in Miami, Florida was finished. He contributed his own ideas to the building's architectural design.

== Filmography ==
- Cocalero (2007)
- Porfirio (2011)
- Monos (2019)
