= La Soledad (film) =

- Poster
- Directed by: Jorge Thielen Armand
- Written by: Jorge Thielen Armand; Rodrigo Michelangeli
- Produced by: Adriana Herrera; Rodrigo Michelangeli; Jorge Thielen Armand; Manon Ardisson
- Starring: José Dolores López; Adrializ López; Jorge Roque Thielen; Marley Alvillares; María del Carmen Agámez
- Cinematography: Rodrigo Michelangeli
- Edited by: Felipe Guerrero
- Production companies: La Faena; Alfarería Cinematográfica; Ardimages UK
- Release date: September 2016 (Venice Film Festival)
- Countries: Venezuela; Canada; Italy
- Language: Spanish

La Soledad is a 2016 drama film co-written, co-produced and directed Jorge Thielen Armand in his directorial debut. It premiered in the 73rd Venice International Film Festival. The production received the financial support of The Venice Biennale College and it is a co-production between Venezuela, Canada and Italy.

== Plot ==
The inspiration for filming La Soledad emerged from the childhood memories and experiences of the director in the family house of his grandparents, in the city of Caracas, Venezuela. After living abroad for years, he came back to the country to shoot in that same house a film that sways between documentary and fiction.

The house, which is itself a character, has been practically abandoned by the director's family and is about to collapse. It is now the home of new occupants: Rosina, who was formerly an employee of the owners, and her grandson José. The "proprietors" decide to demolish it and "the squatters" must seek a new place to live in. The film portrays core issues of contemporary Venezuelan society.

== Cast ==
- José Dolores López
- Adrializ López
- Jorge Roque Thielen H.
- Marley Alvillares
- María del Carmen Agámez

== Reception ==
Glenn Kenny of RogerEbert.com wrote that La Soledad was "poetic and ultimately devastating". Leslie Felperin of The Guardian expressed: "This promising debut feature opens up gradually, like a fragrant but potentially poisonous night-blooming flower".

Additionally, it received the Honorable Mention at the 4th edition of La Casa Cine Fest and at the 48th edition of the Nashville Film Festival.

== Awards and nominations ==
Award	Category	Recipient(s)	Result	References
Festival Biarritz Amérique-Latine	Prix du Syndicat Français de la critique de cinéma	Jorge Thielen Armand	Winner	
Miami International Film Festival	Audience Award for Best Film	Jorge Thielen Armand	Winner	
Atlanta Film Festival	Jury Prize	Jorge Thielen Armand	Winner	
Rhode Island International Film Festival	First Prize	Jorge Thielen Armand	Winner	
Cinema Tropical Awards	Best Latin American First Film	Jorge Thielen Armand	Winner	
International Durban Film Festival	Best Screenplay	Jorge Thielen Armand, Rodrigo Michelangeli	Winners	
International Durban Film Festival	Best Editing	Felipe Guerrero	Winner	
Festival de Cine Latinoamericano de La Plata	Best Film	Jorge Thielen Armand	Winner	
Festival del Cine Venezolano	Best First Film	Jorge Thielen Armand	Winner	
Festival del Cine Venezolano	Best Sound	Mario Nazoa	Winner	
