= Alma Mater (film) =

2004 film

Alma mater
- Directed by: Álvaro Buela
- Written by: Álvaro Buela
- Produced by: José Pedro Charlo; María Zanocchi
- Release date: September 16, 2005
- Running time: 100 minutes
- Country: Uruguay
- Language: Spanish

Alma Mater is a 2005 Uruguayan film directed by Álvaro Buela.

Starring Roxana Blanco, Nicolás Becerra, Werner Schünemann and Walter Reyno, it deals with the life of a virgin woman who thinks herself as the future mother of a Saviour of the World.

In 2005 it was nominated to the Goya Award for Best Iberoamerican Film.
