= La segunda muerte =

- Film poster
- Directed by: Santiago Fernández Calvete
- Screenplay by: Victoria Pedemonte
- Cinematography: Darío Sabina
- Edited by: Mariana Quiroga
- Distributed by: Agustina Lecouna; Tomás Lizzio; Guillermo Arengo; Mauricio Dayub
- Release dates: April 14, 2012 (BAFICI); March 13, 2014
- Running time: 91 minutes
- Country: Argentina
- Language: Spanish

La segunda muerte (English: The Second Death) is a 2012 Argentinian horror/drama. The film concerns a small village in the pampas which is plagued by mysterious deaths that a young, clairvoyant boy attributes to the Virgin Mary. As of 2017, it is only available on home video in South America.

== Plot ==
A young boy, about 9 or 10 years old, and his adult man (if that man is the boy's father or not, is unclear) - but while driving on a low-traffic road does at least the boy see the strange face of a woman, just as a flash lightens up the environment. The day after, is a totally burned body found on the same road. A young good looking female police officer has to deal with the mystery. The forensic doctor says "it must have been the lightning". But somehow does the boy feel that's all wrong. And the young police officer is suspicious as well. And after have talked with the boy, she decides that the boy and his possible dad must stay in the village, for a few days. Then a second badly burnt body is found, and this time the forensic doctor cannot blame it on the weather. But still he gives the diagnosis "dead by a lightning hit" - again. He simply has no other explanation.

However, the police officer realises that this simply cannot be a question of two flashes from the sky. And the young boy appear to see certain things, which he dare not share with the adult man with whom he's travelling. After a third equal death do some of the villagers conclusions of their own, but they do not wish to share their theories with the police. Instead comes the village's priest in focus for them. This time does the forensic analyst suggest "spontaneous self-burning", but the truth is that he hasn't got a clue about what has happened. The young boy can see some things from the past, and it becomes obvious that something evil hit the village 30 or 40 years ago. A dead woman has as some kind of ghost returned to the little village, in order to avenge some kind of old injustice.

== Cast ==
- Agustina Lecouna
- Tomás Lizzio
- Guillermo Arengo
- Mauricio Dayub
- Germán de Silva
- Ricardo Díaz Mourelle

== Broadcasts on television ==
- The Danish DR K channel aired this film during the summer or autumn of 2015.
