= Porfirio (film) =

2011 film

- Film poster
- Directed by: Alejandro Landes
- Written by: Alejandro Landes
- Produced by: Francisco Aljure; Alejandro Landes
- Starring: Porfirio Ramirez
- Cinematography: Thimios Bakatakis
- Release dates: 14 May 2011 (Cannes); 2 March 2012 (Colombia)
- Running time: 101 minutes
- Country: Colombia
- Language: Spanish

Porfirio is a 2011 Colombian drama film directed by Alejandro Landes. The film premiered at the 2011 Cannes Film Festival and subsequently screened at other festivals including Toronto and Maryland. It won Golden Peacock (Best Film) at the 42nd International Film Festival of India.

The film is based on the real-life story of Porfirio Ramirez, who was cast to play himself. Porfirio becomes paraplegic after being shot by a rogue police officer.

== Cast ==
- Porfirio Ramirez as himself
- Jarlinsson Ramirez as himself (referred to as "Lissin")
- Yor Jasbleidy Santos as herself
