= Marilia Rocha =

Brazilian filmmaker

- Marilia Rocha in 2009.
- Born: Marília Rocha; 1978 (age 47–48); Brazil
- Occupations: filmmaker, painter, documentalist
- Website: http://www.mariliarocha.com/

Marília Rocha (born 1978) is a Brazilian painter and filmmaker work has focused on the potentialities of documentary film.

Her works have been included in the festivals and special screenings of MoMA – Museum of Modern Art (USA), It's All True (Brazil), Rotterdam IFF (Netherlands), Bafici (Argentina), Guadalajara IFF (Mexico), and Doclisboa (Portugal), among others. Since 2003, she has been a member of Teia, along with Clarissa Campolina, Helvécio Marins Jr., Leonardo Barcelos, Pablo Lobato and Sérgio Borges. The group founded a center for audiovisual production and research where they work collaboratively, combining the individual production with projects that involve the whole team and invited professionals.

== Filmography ==
- 2016, Where I Grow Old.
- 2009, A Falta que me Faz / Like Water Through Stone.
- 2008, Acácio
- 2005, Aboio

== Awards ==
Cattle Callers

- Best film 10th It's All True – International Documentary Festival (Brazil);
- Best sound track and best sound 9th CinePE (Brazil);
- Best film 10th Rio de Janeiro International Ethnographic Film Festival (Brazil).

== Screenings ==
Like Water Through Stone

- 39th Film Festival Rotterdam (Netherlands)
- 42nd Brasília Festival of Brazilian Film (Brazil)
- 13th Tiradentes Film Festival (Brazil)

Acacio

- 38th International Film Festival Rotterdam (Netherlands)
- 11th BAFICI - Buenos Aires Independent Film Festival (Argentina)
- DocLisboa 2009 (Portugal)
- 24th Guadalajara International Film Festival (Mexico)
- 10th International Film Festival of Las Palmas de Gran Canaria (Spain)
- 32nd São Paulo International Film Festival (Brazil)
- SANFIC5 -Santiago International Festival (Chile)
- 13th Lima International Festival (Peru)
- 31st Havana Film Festival (Cuba)
- 12th Tiradentes Film Festival (Brazil)
- forumdoc.bh.2008 - International Documentary Festival (Brazil)
- I Semana dos Realizadores (Brazil)

Cattle Callers

- MoMA - The Museum of Modern Art (USA)
- 21st Guadalajara International Film Festival (Mexico)
- 41st Karlovy Vary International Film Festival (Czech Republic)
- 9th Rencontres internationales du documentaire de Montréal (Canada)
- 7th Tempo Documentary Festival (Sweden)
- 10th It's All True – International Documentary Festival (Brazil)
- Rio International Festival (Brazil)
- 9th CinePE (Brazil)
- FICA – International Festival of Environmental Film and Video (Brazil)
- 10th Rio de Janeiro International Ethnographic Film Festival (Brazil)
- 10th FAM - Florianópolis Audiovisual Mercosul (Brazil)
- Indie2005 - World Film Festival (Brazil)
- 9th Tiradentes Film Festival (Brazil)
- Les Écrans Documentaires (France)
- Rencontres Internationales Paris/Berlin (France)
