= Rapado =

- Still of the film featuring Damián Dreizik
- Directed by: Martín Rejtman
- Written by: Martín Rejtman
- Produced by: Martín Rejtman
- Starring: Ezequiel Cavia; Damián Dreyzik
- Cinematography: José Luis García
- Edited by: Garry Lane
- Music by: Grupo Suárez; Paul M. van Brugge
- Release dates: August 1992 (Switzerland); 1 August 1996 (Argentina)
- Running time: 75 minutes
- Countries: Argentina; Netherlands
- Language: Spanish

Rapado (lit. 'Buzz cut') is an Argentine and Dutch 1992 drama film, written and directed by Martín Rejtman, in his first feature film. It is considered by critics as the film that started the New Argentine Cinema, or NCA (Nuevo Cine Argentino), an aesthetic movement representing a fundamental break with the Argentine cinema of the late 1980s and early 1990s, by introducing new narrative elements and a strong realistic style.

== Synopsis ==
A teenager's motorcycle, money and sneakers are stolen. He then tries to steal another motorcycle to replace the one gone, but fails. In the course of a few days, his obsession with finding a suitable motorcycle to steal leads to a series of interconnected events between several people with apparently nothing in common.

== Cast ==
- Ezequiel Cavia
- Damián Dreizik
- Mirta Busnelli
- Horacio Peña
- Lucas Marty
- Cecilia Biagini
- José Glusman
- Pichón Baldinú
- Verónica Llinás

== Background ==
The director/producer Martín Rejtman used a minimalist style in making this film. He said, "When I made Rapado, I felt that Argentinean cinema had too much dialogue, and bad dialogue at that. I hate adornments, I hate artifice, I hate anything that's unnecessary, because there really is nothing beyond the screen."

== Exhibition ==
The film was first presented at the Locarno International Film Festival in Switzerland in August 1992. It was released wide in Argentina on 1 August 1996.

== Critical reception ==
Pablo Suárez, a film critic for the Buenos Aires Herald and a member of FIPRESCI Argentina said, "[Rapado, his] first feature demonstrated that another type of cinema was possible in Argentina, one capable of pushing boundaries. Rapado was an absolute oasis in a land plagued by films with agonizing narratives, with neither depth nor genuine inspiration, and yet still subsidized by a State [through the National Institute of Cinema and Audiovisual Arts (INCAA); also referred to as the Argentine National Film Board - an autharquic agency which is part of the Argentine Government and is dedicated to financing film projects] in favor of the status quo."

== Awards ==
Wins

- Argentine Film Critics Association Awards: Silver Condor; Best First Film, Martín Rejtman; 1997.

Nominations

- Locarno International Film Festival: Golden Leopard; Martín Rejtman; 1992.
