= Eduardo Calcagno =

Argentine director and producer (1941–2026)

Eduardo Calcagno (26 January 1941 – 31 August 2026) was an Argentine director, producer and screenwriter.

Calcagno was born in Buenos Aires, Argentina on 26 January 1941. His father was the film critic and screenwriter Raimundo Calcagno. Eduardo Calcagno died on 31 August 2026, at the age of 85.

== Filmography ==
=== Director ===
- Fuiste mía un verano (1969)
- El diablo sin dama
- Nunca dejes de empujar, Antonio
- Los enemigos (1983)
- Te amo (1986)
- The Eyes of the Scissors (Spanish: El censor, 1995)
- Yepeto (1999)
- El salto de Christian
- Ulises, un alma desbordada (2014)
