= Martín Rejtman =

Argentine film director

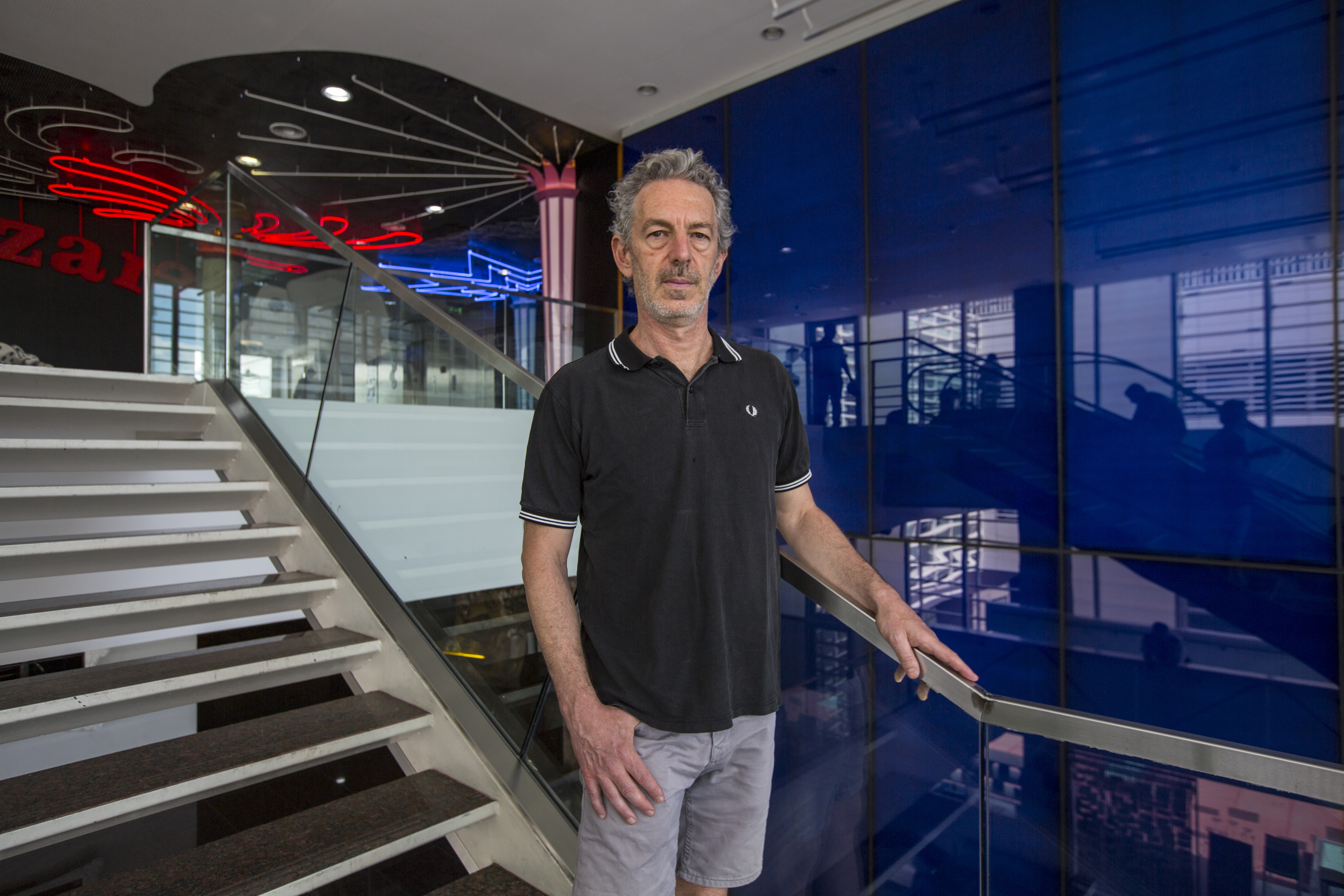
- Rejtman in 2019
- Born: Martín Rejtman; January 3, 1961 (age 65); Buenos Aires, Argentina
- Occupations: Film director, screenwriter and film producer
- Years active: 1986–present

Martín Rejtman (born January 3, 1961, in Buenos Aires) is an Argentine writer and film director. He is considered to be a key figure in the New Argentine Cinema, making films such as Silvia Prieto and The Magic Gloves. His documentary Riders won the Eurimages Co-Production Development Award at the San Sebastián International Film Festival in 2020.

== Biography ==
Martín Rejtman was born 3 January 1961 in Buenos Aires. He studied cinema at the Escuela Panamericana de Arte in Buenos Aires. He then took two years of film studies at New York University, making a short film every week. His first full-length film, Rapado, was criticised by the National Film Institute of Argentina (INCAA), so he looked to foreign funders and settled upon a frugal film-making style which uses small crews and a low budget. Rejtman has a minimalist filmmaking style. He said, "When I made Rapado, I felt that Argentine cinema had too much dialogue, and bad dialogue at that. I hate adornments, I hate artifice, I hate anything that's unnecessary, because there really is nothing beyond the screen." Rapado was based on a short story Rejtman had written in 1992 and was partly funded by the Dutch Hubert Bals Fund. It premiered at the International Film Festival Rotterdam.

Rejtman then made Silvia Prieto (1999), The Magic Gloves (2003, originally Los Guantes mágicos), Elementary Training for Actors (2009, originally Entrenamiento elemental para actores) and Two Shots Fired (2014). He is regarded as a key figure in the New Argentine Cinema, alongside Esteban Sapir. In 2009, he filmed a documentary, Copacabana, about a Bolivian festival in Buenos Aires.

He then planned to make a film in Santiago, Chile, provisionally titled The Practice (La práctica). This was his first film made outside Argentina and follows an Argentine yoga instructor living in Chile. Regarding the change in routine, Rejtman commented that he liked Santiago after editing the sound for Two Shots Fired there and that "every day in Buenos Aires I witness how places I’d love to include in my films are getting lost or destroyed [...] in Santiago it is possible that the same phenomenon happens, but those altered locations are new to me." Before filming started on The Practice, Rejtman released a comedic short film, Shakti. He said it concerned "a Jewish young man, the death of his grandmother, depression, Hare Krishnas, Pesach (Passover), and potato knishes."

During the COVID-19 pandemic, Rejtman began work on a documentary about the delivery drivers of Buenos Aires. Since most of the drivers are Venezuelan, Rejtman commented that the film was about both migration and the gig economy. It won the Eurimages Co-Production Development Award at the San Sebastián International Film Festival. The film is entitled Riders (originally El repartidor está en camino).

== Filmography ==
Director

- Doli vuelve a casa (1986) (short)
- Sistema español (1988) (short)
- Rapado (1992)
- Silvia Prieto (1999)
- The Magic Gloves (2003) (Los guantes mágicos)
- Copacabana (2006) (documentary)
- Elementary Training for Actors (Entrenamiento elemental para actores) (2009) with Federico León
- Two Shots Fired (2014)
- Shakti (2019) (short)
- The Practice (2023)

== Awards ==
Wins

- Argentine Film Critics Association Awards: Silver Condor; Best First Film, Martín Rejtman; for: Rapado: 1997.

Nominations

- Locarno International Film Festival: Golden Leopard; Martín Rejtman; for: Rapado; 1992.
- Argentine Film Critics Association Awards: Silver Condor; Best Original Screenplay; for: Silvia Prieto; 2000.
- Locarno International Film Festival: Golden Leopard; for: Los Guantes mágicos; 2003.

== See also ==
- Cinema of Argentina
