= Cinema of Venezuela =

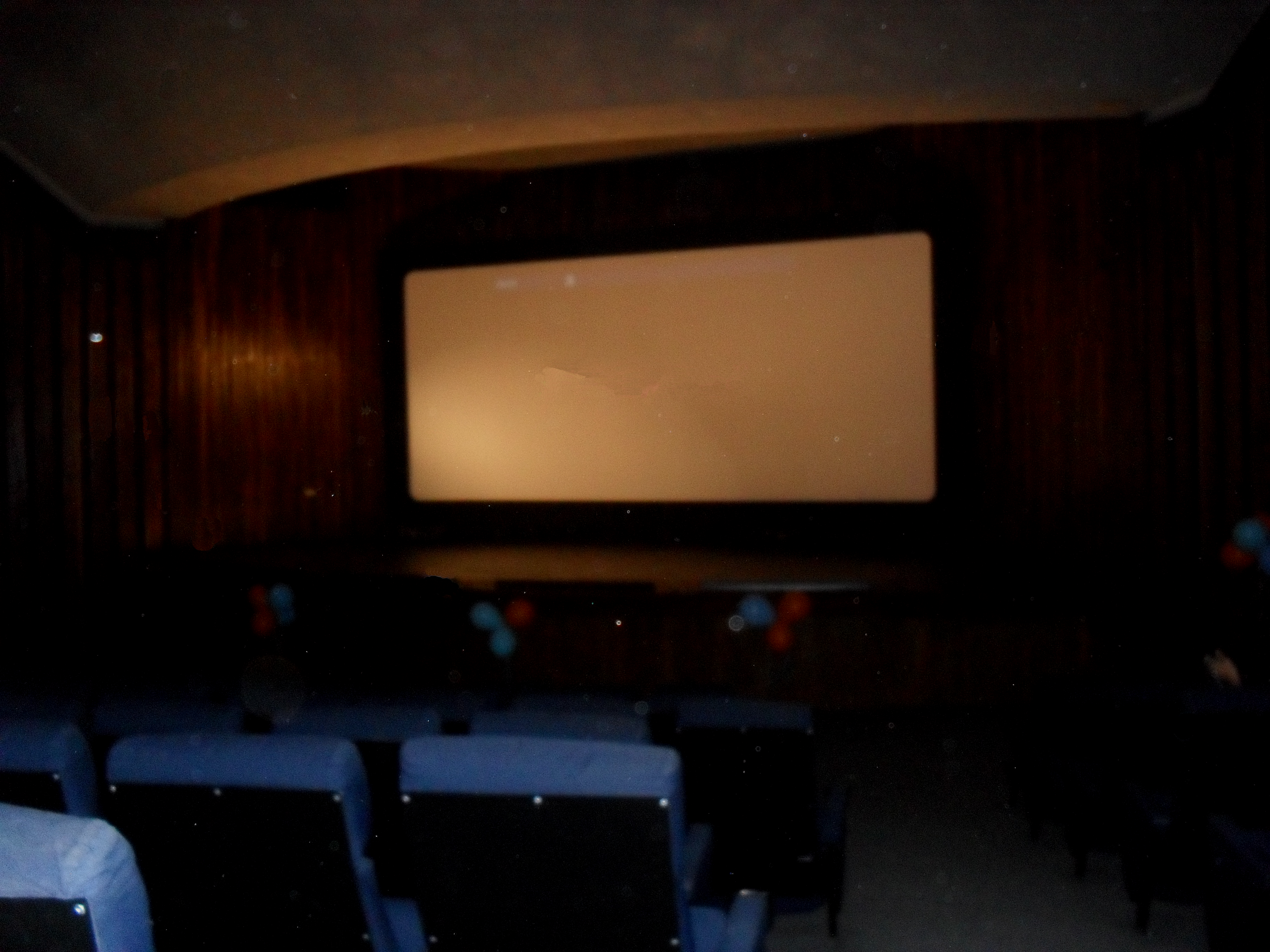
- National Cinema at Museo Bellas Artes
- No. of screens: 481 (2013)
  - Per capita: 1.8 per 100,000 (2013)
- Main distributors: Cinematográfica Blancica; The Walt Disney Company Venezuela; Cines Unidos^{(2011)} Cinex

Produced feature films (2013)
- Total: 21
- Fictional: 18
- Animated: -
- Documentary: 3

Number of admissions (2013)
- Total: 30,069,381
- National films: 2,429,560 (8.1%)

Gross box office (2013)
- Total: VEF 1.42 billion
- National films: VEF 104 million (7.3%)

The cinema of Venezuela is the production and industry of filmmaking in Venezuela. Film was introduced to the country in 1896, with the first national films screened in 1897. Several films were made in the last few years of the 19th Century, with a lower rate of production until the 1970s.

Venezuelan cinema has evolved through various phases, including early documentary and propaganda films, the emergence of a national industry in the mid-20th century, and the rise of socially engaged cinema during the 1970s and 1980s. In recent decades, Venezuelan filmmakers have gained increasing recognition at international festivals, even as the industry has navigated economic challenges and varying degrees of state involvement.

Since the mid-2000s and developing in the 2010s, the more successful national films have been LGBT-related as part of the broader wave of Latin American New Maricón Cinema, with several of the country's Oscar submissions being based in LGBT+ narratives.

Notable Venezuelan filmmakers include Román Chalbaud, Margot Benacerraf, Fina Torres, Clemente de la Cerda, Mariana Rondón, Lorenzo Vigas, Jorge Thielen Armand, among others.

== History ==
=== Early years (1890s–1930s) ===
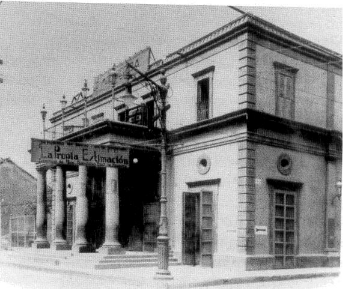
Teatro Baralt in 1896, where the first Venezuelan films were screened

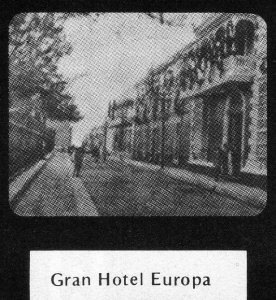
A frame from Un célebre especialista sacando muelas en el gran Hotel Europa, thought be lost for many decades

It is said by film writers that during this time, filmmaking was limited to "a few pioneering filmmakers [...] who survived by selling propaganda-style documentaries and newsreels to the [Juan Vicente Gómez dictatorship]". It is also suggested that Venezuelans as a society were more film consumers than producers in this time, and that artistic films were only produced in the wider context of photography or physical art.

The first films shown in Venezuela were released on 11 July 1896 at the Baralt Theatre in Maracaibo. This was, however, not fully known until almost a century later in 1983; cinema scholarship in Venezuela was only developed during its "Golden Age" in the late 1970s, until which point the "official history [...] was limited to amusing stories told by those who were present during the early years."

The early exhibition was facilitated by entrepreneur Luis Manuel Méndez, who had travelled to New York City in June 1896 and acquired a Vitascope, as well as licenses to use it for profit in both Venezuela and Colombia. This made Venezuela the second country in Latin America (after Brazil) to receive film screening technology, and the first to use Vitascope. The films shown included The Monroe Doctrine and Umbrella Dance. Six months later in January 1897 the first films to be produced in Venezuela were shown at the same cinema; these were Un célebre especialista sacando muelas en el gran Hotel Europa and Muchachos bañándose en la laguna de Maracaibo. The reception to the introduction of cinema was seemingly "cold" and "indifferent".

Both these first Venezuelan films, and the credit for bringing Vitascope to Venezuela, have historically been attributed to Manuel Trujillo Durán. Parts of Venezuelan film scholarship have had the tendency to paint Trujillo as the most important film pioneer of the nation; others show that he was simply a photographer who had the ability to operate the Vitascope.

On 15 July 1897 the Cinemagraph was first exhibited in Venezuela, by an employee sent by the Lumière Company, in Caracas. After two months, the Frenchman was run out of the country, but may have helped film this year's Venezuelan film productions, Una paliza en el estado Sarría and Carlos Ruiz peleando con un cochero, shown on 26 November. After these, there is little evidence of film production for the next 10 years, though multiple different brands of film cameras and projectors were in the country. In total, there appears to have been 51 films, 37 short films and 14 features, made in Venezuela between 1897 and 1936. All were silent films. The first feature, La dama de las Cayenas, was released in 1913 with a runtime of 60 minutes.

Narrative films, rather than cinema as novelty, began to be produced in Venezuela in the 1910s, with its pioneers Enrique Zimmerman, director of La Dama de las Cayenas, and Lucas Manzano, who co-created what is considered Venezuela's first narrative film, Don Confusio. It wasn't long after their respective debuts that they began collaboration, with Manzano coming to produce La Dama de las Cayenas. As Manzano's short films had been light comedies, La Dama... was instead a parody film, targeting the Alexandre Dumas story The Lady of the Camellias, that told a torrid love story. Manzano recounted that it was so successful that it persuaded Zimmerman and himself to choose to become filmmakers, "peliculeros".

This was not the only film inspired by literature: Jacobo Capriles and Edgar J. Anzola made La Trepadora, based on a Rómulo Gallegos book as many Latin American films of the century would be, as part of their new production company Triunfo Films, which they had founded in 1923. Soon, film education started in the country, and photographer Amábilis Cordero took correspondence classes to make his first film, Los milagros de la Divina Pastora in 1928; though he could have been the first notable director to have been trained, he still openly thought of himself as a "rookie". The second production company, Cinematograficos Lara, was founded by Cordero from his profits.

Despite these companies existing, Arturo Serrano states that Venezuela "did not have a single professional filmmaker" and was lagging behind the rest of the world "in terms of quality and the use of cinematographic language". Serrano compares Venezuela's output to Battleship Potemkin (Eisenstein, 1925) and Intolerance (Griffith, 1916). While the US and Soviet developed technology and identity, and so seem obvious to be leaders in film, Serrano does say that even compared with "some of the other countries in Latin America" Venezuela was behind, despite receiving film before almost the rest of its continent. From the late 1920s, though, even these amateur artistic films almost ceased in production, the industry falling to the government ministries of Gómez and pseudo-documentary films.

Though almost exclusively making informational films, political powers weren't entirely repressive; in 1932 Gómez' nephew Efrain Gómez returned from a trip to the US with technology that would allow sound to be added to film." With the government film agency LCN (Laboratorio Cinematográfico Nacional) having been merged with Maracay Films, Efrain Gómez worked through this company to make La venus de Nácar: Fantasía Aborigen, the first Venezuelan sound film, using only background music. When Gómez died in 1935, the government agencies of production became more chaotic (briefly becoming SCN — the 'S' for 'Servicio') before being shut down in 1938.

The Ministry of Public Works would lease the film equipment to private companies at the urging of Tomás Pacanins, though the two companies that received the most support had Pacanins as shareholder. One of these companies used the resources to create Venezuela's first synchronous sound film – one that records the sounds belonging to the recorded actions – in 1938; the accolade belongs to either Taboga or El Rompimiento. Taboga features both speech and live music, and scholars also claim it as the first Venezuelan film with a "director to understand the artistic possibilities of cinema as a medium of visual expression". In 1938, the novelist Rómulo Gallegos created Estudios Ávila with cultural and commercial aspirations, deals with the production of the institutional propaganda through the cinema. In 1939 MGM premiered Valiant Venezuela of James Kirkpatrick a travel talk that offers a Technicolor look at 1930s Venezuela, focusing on its colonial architecture and paying tribute to Simón Bolívar's fight for liberation from Spain. It is recognized as one of the earlier Technicolor travelogues covering South American regions.

=== Birth of Venezuelan films (1940s–1960s) ===
From the beginning of the 1940s, there was an attitude of commercialism. Producers in Venezuela "copied [...] Mexico's mode of film production [and] its narrative and formal patterns", to guarantee at least some cinema audience. The film scholar Darlene J. Sadlier comments that "profit was the main objective" in these decades, but that film producers also aimed to make Venezuelan films relatable for Venezuelan people. Even after the death of President Gómez, into the 1950s, most film profits were made from commercial advertisements and propaganda. These films showcased Venezuelan nationalism, through techniques like landscape shots, folklore-based stories, and film stereotypes to make them publicly palatable. There was also competition with the Mexican film industry in these years, with Venezuelan people enjoying and celebrating the Mexican film output; the Mexican film Allá en el Rancho Grande was screened in Venezuela in 1936, and "beat every picture", with the Mexican stories and production system being supported in the following decades. It took only two years for Mexican and Argentinian film to overtake Hollywood films in Venezuelan screening numbers. As Venezuela's film industry was being born in the 1940s, there were co-production agreements established, which let Venezuelan actors appear in Mexican films, in a way to create more Latin American stars and help the Venezuelan films blossom with famous actors from both nations. Having Spanish and other Latin American actors in Venezuelan productions also contributed to a "'feel' of foreignness" that made films more successful in Venezuela.

Landmarks of Venezuelan cinema include two Cannes winners from this period: Carlos Hugo Christensen's 1949 film La Balandra Isabel llego esta tarde, the first South American winner at Cannes, taking the Best Cinematography Award at the 1951 Cannes Film Festival, was the culmination of Bolívar Films' efforts to create a real film industry in Venezuela, though it failed; Margot Benacerraf's 1959 documentary Araya, which "was hailed as a masterpiece of poetic cinema", was entered into the 1959 Cannes Film Festival, where it shared the Cannes International Critics Prize with Alain Resnais' Hiroshima mon amour.

=== The Golden Age: Development of film identity (1970s–1980s) ===
In the World Cinema: Critical Approaches anthology, it is said that whilst "Venezuelan cinema began sporadically in the 1950s[, it] only emerged as a national-cultural movement in the mid-1970s" when it gained state support and auteurs could produce work. The Venezuelan state began giving financial support to cinema through the Directorate of Cinematography in 1975 and introduced a quota of a minimum of two Venezuelan films to be shown by cinemas per year. The support likely came from increased oil wealth in the early 1970s, and the subsequent 1973 credit incentive policy. International co-productions with Latin America and Spain continued into this era and beyond, and Venezuelan films of this time were counted among the works of New Latin American Cinema. This period is known as Venezuela's Golden Age of cinema, having massive popularity even though it was a time of much social and political upheaval.

Filmmakers such as Mauricio Walerstein, Franco Rubartelli, Jorge Sanjinés, Pablo de la Barra, Joseph Novoa, Alberto Monteagudo, Manuel de Pedro, Ugo Ulive, and Félix Nakamura migrate to Venezuela. In 1973, the film When I want to cry, I don't cry directed by Mauricio Walerstein, based on the novel by Miguel Otero Silva, achieves an unprecedented success at the box office, which begins a boom of the so-called New Venezuelan Cinema, a current of social cinema very famous in the 1970s and whose maximum exponents would be, in addition to Walerstein, Román Chalbaud and Clemente de la Cerda.

One of the most famous Venezuelan films, even to date, is the 1976 film Soy un delincuente by Clemente de la Cerda, which won the Special Jury Prize at the 1977 Locarno International Film Festival. Soy un delincuente was one of nine films for which the state gave substantial funding to produce. At the time of its production the film was the most popular film in the country, and took a decade to be usurped from this position, even though it was only one in a string of films designed to tell social realist stories of struggle in the 1950s and '60s.

From Sagrado y Obsceno (1976), Román Chalbaud presents a parody of the Latin American melodrama, constructing emotional stories that address family and social conflicts, approached from a tragicomic tone. His film El Pez que Fuma (1977) is the masterpiece of this genre. Equally famous is the 1978 film El Cabito directed by Daniel Oropeza.

The Directorate of Cinematography initially was part of the Ministry of Tourism but in 1977 moved under the Ministry of Development. The Directorate at the time was headed by three women, Marianela Saleta, Maria Isabel Loperena, and Silvia Allegret.

From 1 January 1977, following increased investment and production, the quota for Venezuelan films to be shown per year increased to 12 (or 30% of all films). At the time, the country's film distribution was dominated by Antonio Blanco's Blanco & Travieso and Gonzalo and Silvio Ulivi's Cines Unidos.

In 1981 FONCINE (the Venezuelan Film Fund) was founded, and this year it provided even more funding to produce seventeen feature films. 1983 saw the release of the international mega-hit Secuestro En Acapulco-Canta Chamo, a Venezuelan-Mexican co-production starring Venezuelan boy band Los Chamos and Mexican actresses La Chilindrina and Yuri. (in Spanish) Then, that same year, with the Viernes Negro, oil prices depreciated and Venezuela entered a depression which prevented such extravagant funding, film production continued; more transnational productions occurred, many more with Spain due to Latin America experiencing poor economic fortune in general, and there was some success in new cinema, as well: Fina Torres' 1985 Oriana won the Caméra d'Or Prize at the 1985 Cannes Film Festival as the best first feature.

Film production peaked in 1984–5,^{:37} with 1986 considered Venezuelan cinema's most successful year by the state, thanks to over 4 million admissions to national films, according to Venezuelanalysis.

Venezuelan capital Caracas hosted the Ibero-American Forum on Cinematography Integration in 1989, from which the pan-continental IBERMEDIA was formed; a union which provides regional funding.

=== Falling production (1990s) ===
After the political unrest at the start of the 1990s, film production had very little income despite staying relatively strong through Viernes Negro; FONCINE was issued a bailout in 1991 to restart the industry on a smaller scale.^{:41} In 1993 Venezuelan cinema saw what could have been another boom. FONCINE attempted to promote national filmmaking by more than quintupling their funding. Venezuela also ratified its first National Cinematography Law in 1993. This law aimed to promote filmmaking, but had failings in financial provisions until it was amended in 2005. The film identity of the decade was most significantly marked by a greater world presence and more festival wins in the mid-1990s, like Joseph Novoa's Sicario (1994), which won the Best Feature Film Award at the Santa Barbara International Film Festival. Devil's Gold (1999) was another blockbuster in Venezuela and won 3 international awards becoming the official selection for the Oscars in Venezuela's behalf.

Spokespersons for national cinema in the Chávez administration said the collapse of the industry was caused by "a mixture of economic crisis, neoliberal policies and industry instability"; Victor Lucker of the private national distributor Cine Amazonia Films believes that the "governments of that period contributed to the decline", saying that policies were new and unclear.

One documentary released in the 1990s is seen as a key resource in Latin American film history; Alfredo Anzola's El misterio de los ojos escarlata was made using footage recorded by Anzola's father, Edgar J. Anzola, a director in the 1920s and 1930s who never saw much success and moved onto another career; he helped open Radio Caracas. Edgar's unknown history is said to reveal what filmmaking of the period may have been like, as little is known and recorded.

=== Modern cinema (2000–present) ===
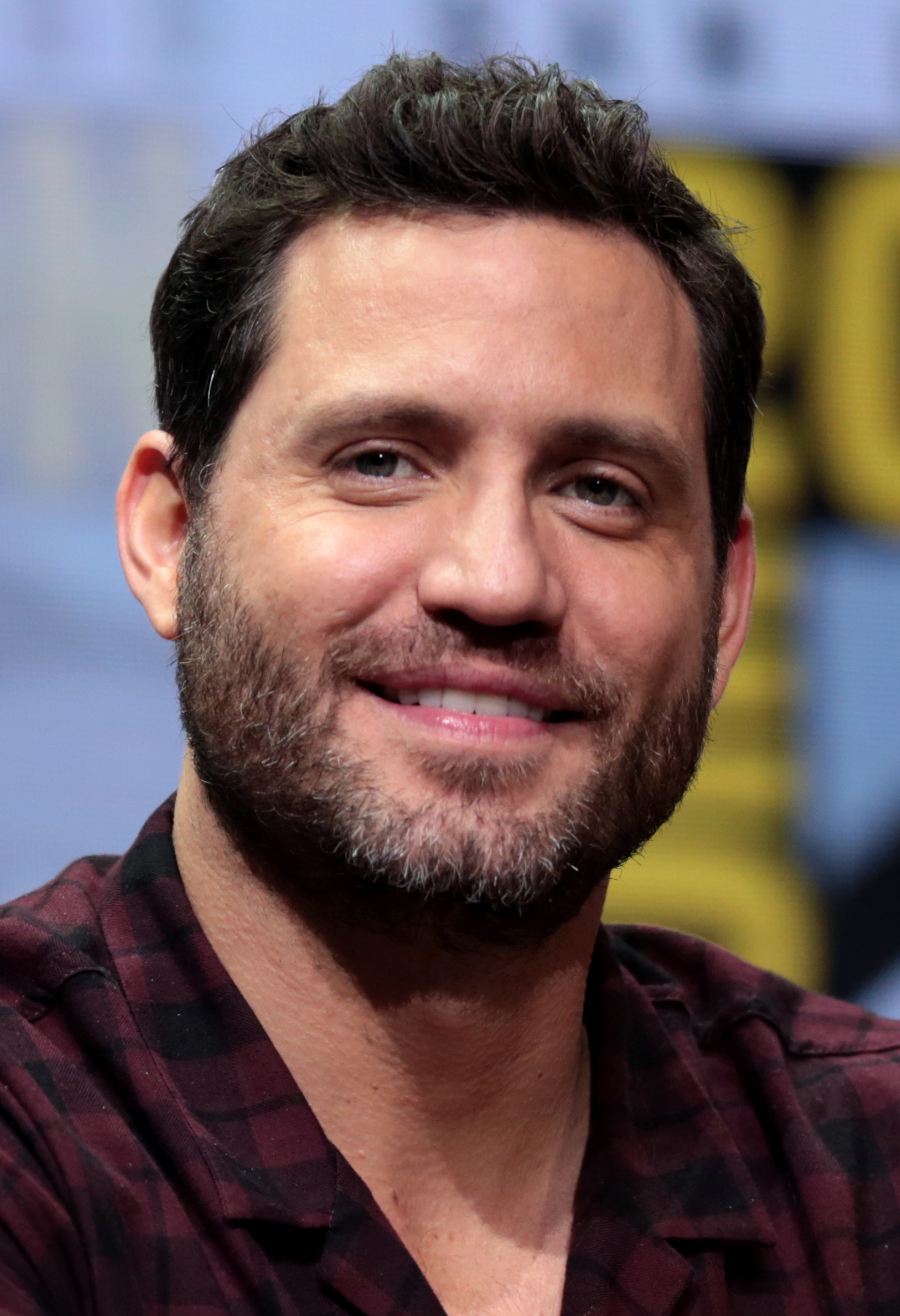
Actor Édgar Ramírez in 2017

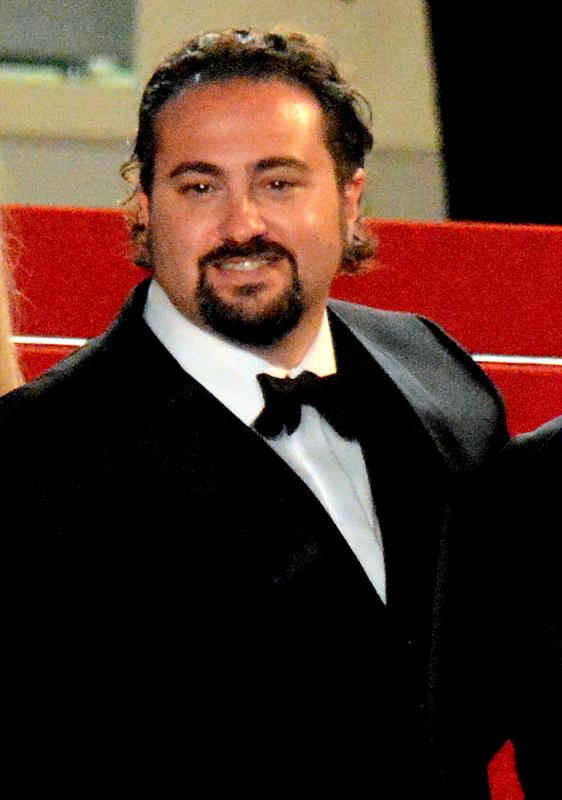
Director Jonathan Jakubowicz in 2016

A few decades after most Western cinemas found their legs, Venezuela found theirs. The 21st century saw an increase in production aligned with other developments introduced to the country. There were more films made, and to a higher standard. Elia K. Schneider's Punto y Raya (2004), actor Édgar Ramírez' first film, won four international awards, including the Special Jury Prize at the Havana Film Festival. Fundación Villa del Cine (English: Cinema City or Cinemaville) a government-funded Venezuelan film and TV production house was inaugurated on 3 June 2006 by Venezuelan President Hugo Chávez in the city of Guarenas, near the capital, Caracas.

One highly criticised film of the time is Jonathan Jakubowicz's Secuestro Express (2005), distributed internationally by Miramax and then-highest-grossing Venezuelan film, which may criticise organised crime. The social narrative is highly discussed, critics generally agreed that social issues are made apparent but not commented on. The lack of depth in favor of presenting ultra-violence is said to compromise the narrative of the film, with said violence also unpalatable to some, and questionable moral undertones of poverty justifying the actions. Though criticised, the negative presentation of the nation was still present, and this "enraged" Hugo Chávez enough to publicly threaten Jakubowicz, a filmmaker who became more prominent and celebrated in the years after this. In 2007 John Petrizzelli direct Maria Lionza, Aliento de Orquídeas based on a mythical indigenous princess abducted by an anaconda that reflects on the magic cult of María Lionza, always in transformation since colonial times. The sum of the pilgrimage to the top of the Sorte mountain and the personal visions and particular worlds of believers show us an eclectic and permeable Maria Lionza that has endured over time.

Comparatively, many of the films of 2000–2010 have historical settings, and tackle social issues there, from Román Chalbaud's El Caracazo (2005), which was the most costly Venezuelan film at the time, to Mariana Rondón's 2007 film Postales de Leningrado, which was awarded the Golden Sun Award at the Biarritz International Festival of Latin American Cinema, to 2009's Venezzia, produced by Haik Gazarian, which won about fifteen awards around the world in film festivals and is one of Venezuela's most expensive films overall.

In the late 2000s other genres, those seen as neither propaganda nor productive in social criticism, began to make appearances. In 2010, Fina Torres' romance-drama Habana Eva was awarded Best International Feature at the New York International Latino Film Festival. The 2013 horror film La Casa del Fin de los Tiempos became such a success that its director was hired in 2016 to shoot an American remake. Papita, maní, tostón a 2013 Venezuelan sports comedy film written and directed by Luis Carlos Hueck. Starring Juliette Pardau and Jean Pierre Agostini, it narrates the encounter between two eternal baseball teams rivals, a fan of the Leones del Caracas and another of the Navegantes de Magallanes. It is one of the most watched Venezuelan films in the history of the country, with almost 2 million tickets sold nationally.

==== Post-2013 ====
Despite successes in Venezuelan cinema, the Routledge Companion to Latin American Cinema, published in 2017, still makes a distinction between big Latin American film markets in Mexico, Argentina, and Brazil, and the cinema regimes of nations like Cuba and Venezuela. It explains that Venezuela is a particularly obvious case of "how state investments, [and] both direct and indirect support, can influence domestic productions carried out ostensibly by private companies", suggesting that even in the 2010s Venezuelan film productions have some element of state control and propaganda. Maduro had appointed his son, Nicolás Maduro Guerra, as the head of the Escuela Nacional de Cine shortly after taking power in 2014, with critics challenging the 23-year-old Maduro Guerra's credentials and accusing the president of nepotism. Venezuelan playwright José Tomás Angola is reported to have responded that "Maduro's son knows nothing [about cinema] [...] What he does know is how to steal a camera." (Note: This may be a pun; the Spanish word "camara" signifies both camera and chamber, i.e. of public office) By 2019, Maduro Guerra no longer held the position, but was being investigated by the United States for allegations of propaganda and censorship.

Overall, the 2010s films of Venezuela are much more socially critical of the present than previous mainstream Venezuelan films were, including some which deal with homosexuality and homophobia, and dubbed by El País as "hearty revival in Venezuela's movie-making industry". Examples of these like Pelo malo (2013), Azul y no tan rosa (2012), and Desde Allá (2015) are among the nation's most well-known and most successful films, winning multiple international awards.

Other films from later in the decade take a stance directly against the government, La Soledad and La familia focus on surviving amid the economic crisis, while 2018's Chavismo: The Plague of the 21st Century is, as titled, a distasteful look on the government's Chavist ideology. Carlos Oteyza's El pueblo soy yo analyzes the populism of Hugo Chávez. Jorge Thielen Armand's La Soledad is described by The Economist as "the latest in a glut of Venezuelan films telling unflinching, complex stories of life in the troubled Andean nation", which also acknowledges that many films received state funding in the past; it proposes that the reason is a continuation of Chávez' isolationist policies in an attempt to maintain state control over pictures shown in cinemas. The article then discusses how Venezuela was, in 2017, at a critical tipping point, facing the simultaneous increase in independent Venezuelan filmmaking and mass emigration of directors and cinematographers.

In February 2017, Nicolás Maduro announced that there was a dire need to create a biographical film of Chávez, to tell a hero's story and to counter the presentation of the dictator by international film and television; Román Chalbaud had begun production on a Chávez trilogy by mid-2018. In July 2017, the Centro Nacional Autónomo de Cinematografía, previously autonomous if supported by the government, was appointed a new chair in the Deputy Culture Minister Aracelis García.

In 2020, the International Film Festival Rotterdam presented the feature film La Fortaleza by Jorge Thielen Armand in the Tiger Competition; La Fortaleza is the first Venezuelan title compete in this A-list festival.

Later in 2020, El Father Plays Himself by Italian-American filmmaker Mo Scarpelli, a documentary on the making of La Fortaleza by Jorge Thielen Armand was released at Visions du Réel. Rather than a traditional making-of film, Scarpelli's film focuses on the father/actor-son/director relationship to make a semi-biographical film.

In 2023, Visions du Réel presented the feature documentary My Father's Prison on the imprisonment of the political prisoner Iván Simonovis. The film was directed by his son, Iván Andrés Simonovis.

In 2024, FID Marseille premiered the feature film Los Capítulos Perdidos by Lorena Alvarado.

In 2025, the Sundance Film Festival presented the short film Pasta Negra directed by Jorge Thielen Armand. The film is an adaptation of the short story Tijeras by Venezuelan author Karina Sainz Borgo.

In 2026, the Cannes Film Festival premiered the controversial feature film Death Has No Master by Jorge Thielen Armand in the Directors' Fortnight section. The film starred Asia Argento.

== Animation ==
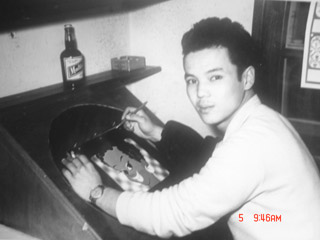
Felix Nakamura at the drawing board

In the 1970s, a successful animation studio, Antarki, owned by Félix Nakamura, launched in Venezuela. Its success here was expanded across Latin American markets by one of its most famous animators, Benicio Vicente Kou.^{:417} Román Chalbaud's 1990 Western film Cuchillos de fuego features some stop-motion animation to illustrate a young David.

The Centro Nacional Autónomo de Cinematografía has operated initiatives in partnership with other establishments to promote animated filmmaking in Latin America. However, there are few animated films in Venezuela. The 2011 animated short No Stingray Pie for Dinner Tonight took a year to create and is only five minutes long; the director limited its length to maintain consistent quality and described the animating process as hard, with certain limitations imposed on the production.

The company 5 pollo C.A. was founded in 2014 and specialises in animation.

In Venezuelan film, animation techniques can be used to deliver a social message. The 2014 short documentary "From the Brink: Venezuela Rising" is an American production by VICE, where animation is used to fill in where there is either no live footage or the real images are too sensitive, the film covering an outsider experiencing the 2014 Venezuelan protests; a 2019 viral Storybooth video also uses animation to tell the story of protests in Venezuela, here so used because it was produced in the United States, featuring the Venezuelan emigrant whose story to asylum is being told. Other techniques in recent films include the shadow puppets in 2015 short Valle Cocodrilo.

The 2017 animated film Pequeños héroes tells a story of Simón Bolívar and was a South American co-production sponsored by Villa del Cine. It was aimed at children, though described to be slightly out of the field because it is not a typical Hollywood animation; because of the audience, the Argentine director did not want the film to feel nationalistic. The film was seen as a "giant step for Latin American animation" with its use of motion capture.

== Depictions of the Bolivarian Revolution and Crisis in Venezuela ==
There are many depictions of the Bolivarian Revolution and its fallout in the Crisis in Venezuela in films, from both national and international filmmakers.^{:113-122} There is criticism of both those made by the national Villa del Cine for turning stories of revolution into Hollywood narratives, and of several international films for not presenting a complete story.^{:113-122} Films on the subject receive mixed responses from the Bolivarian government; positive portrayals will be re-run on television and in cinema for decades after release, while those suggesting negatives to the revolution have been banned in the country.

== LGBT+ cinema ==
Films that deal with homosexuality and homophobia in society have become the industry's main drivers in the 2010s. This reflects an "unprecedented" ongoing AIDS crisis in the country, with the government removing anti-retroviral drugs from circulation, and a noticeable lack of government discussion compared to other Latin American nations. An Associated Press report wrote in 2015 that the new wave follows the Cuban gay cinema of the 1990s, as well as noting the irony of several of these films receiving state funding, based on the Cinematography Law. Though, David William Foster, a Latin American film scholar at Arizona State University, suggested that the government is happy with funding LGBT+ films because they know Venezuelans prefer to watch foreign films and so can guarantee the "gay productions" will just be "minor pests" domestically. Comparatively, a Venezuelan LGBT+ rights lawyer José Manuel Simons assures that the people of Venezuela, as reflected by the topic appearing so much in film, are accepting and ready to move towards LGBT+ equality, saying that the government is resisting and needs to catch up.

The wave's beginnings post-Chávez's death have been compared to the rise of Pedro Almodóvar following the death of Franco. Until 2017, the country had one LGBT+ film festival, which had started in 2011: FESTDIVQ (Festival Venezolano de Cine de la Diversidad), promoted by director John Petrizzelli.^{:293}

An opinion piece by José González Vargas in 2019 discussed his appreciation for the growing collection of LGBT Venezuelan films. He recalls that as he grew up, gay characters were either comic, tragic, or upper-class white Americans. Unhappy with the first two representations and feeling alien to the latter, González notes that though he knew he was gay, he couldn't actually associate with anything that this was supposed to mean. He says that "around 2010, something changed" and he could see his community and reality reflected onscreen for the first time.

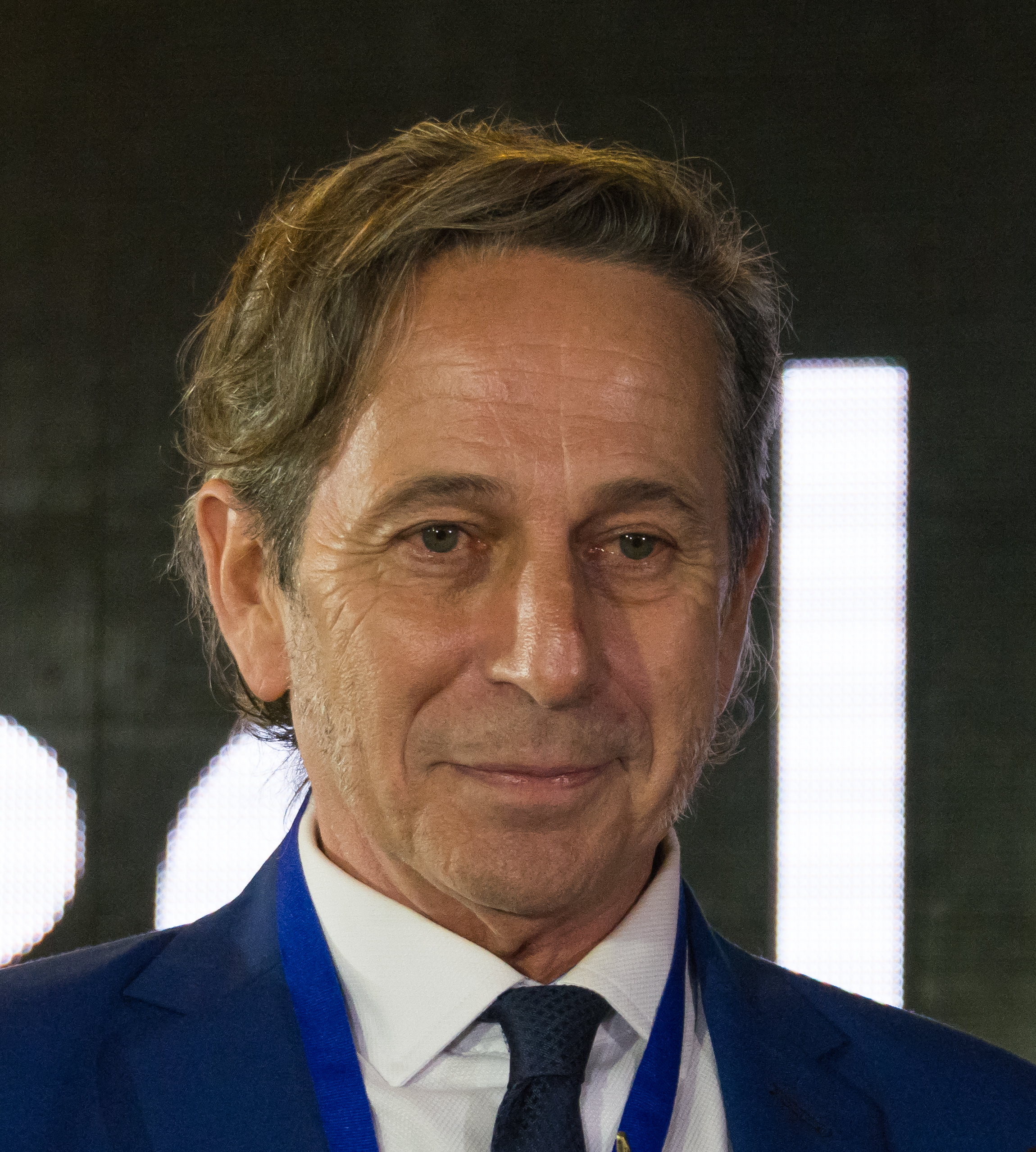
Alfredo Castro, who won an award for his role in Desde Allá

Famous examples include Mariana Rondón's Pelo malo (2013); ostensibly a coming-of-age story, but which even explicitly runs deeper into inherent problems with Venezuelan society. Pelo malo won the Golden Shell at the 2013 San Sebastián International Film Festival, while Miguel Ferrari's Azul y no tan rosa (2012), which did receive public funding from a government program, became the first Venezuelan film to win the Goya Award for Best Spanish Language Foreign Film in its 2014 edition; the two films have been described as "wakeup calls against intolerance and homophobia in today’s society". In 2015, Lorenzo Vigas's film Desde Allá became the first Venezuelan, and first Latin American, film to win the Golden Lion at the Venice International Film Festival. Pelo malo and Desde Allá both discuss other issues common in Venezuela, namely racism and prostitution; Azul y no tan rosa instead is one of few recent Venezuelan films to be set in a middle-class environment, showing that discrimination and social tensions are still present here.

The film trailer for Being Impossible

Premiered at the Valladolid International Film Festival and South by Southwest, 2019 film Being Impossible, about a young intersex person, was commended for not ending tragically, with one reviewer adding that this is especially poignant as a Venezuelan film, bringing up the discussion of its societal context with the nation's "policy concerns regarding gay and queer rights that have yet to be addressed".

González Vargas critiques some of the higher-profile Venezuelan films, saying that Azul y no tan rosa still feels foreign because of how easy being openly gay is for the main character at a time when it was still dangerous to be out in the country, comparing it to the injustices in Pelo malo that made it resonate with him.

== Women in filmmaking ==
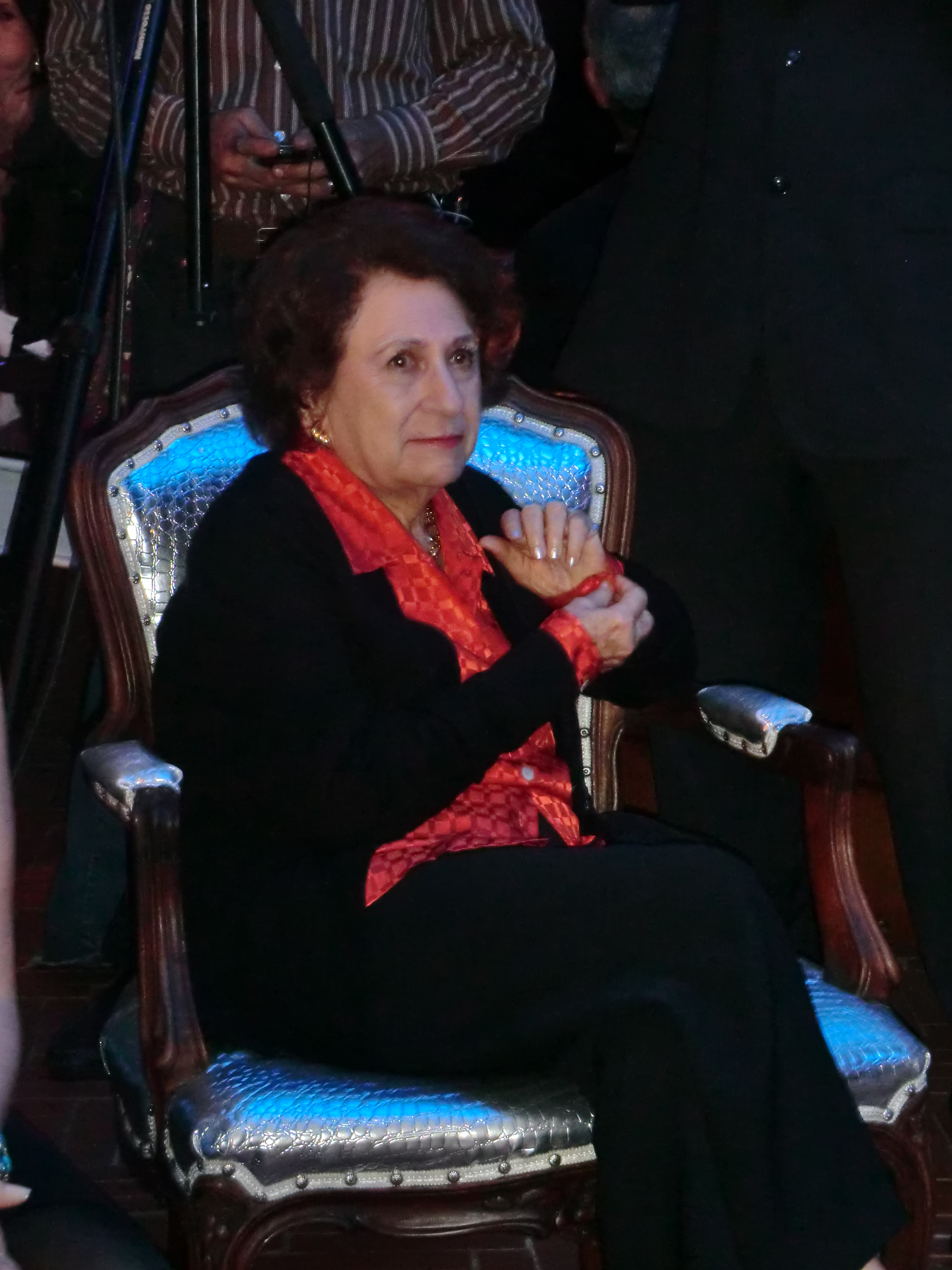
Margot Benacerraf in 2012

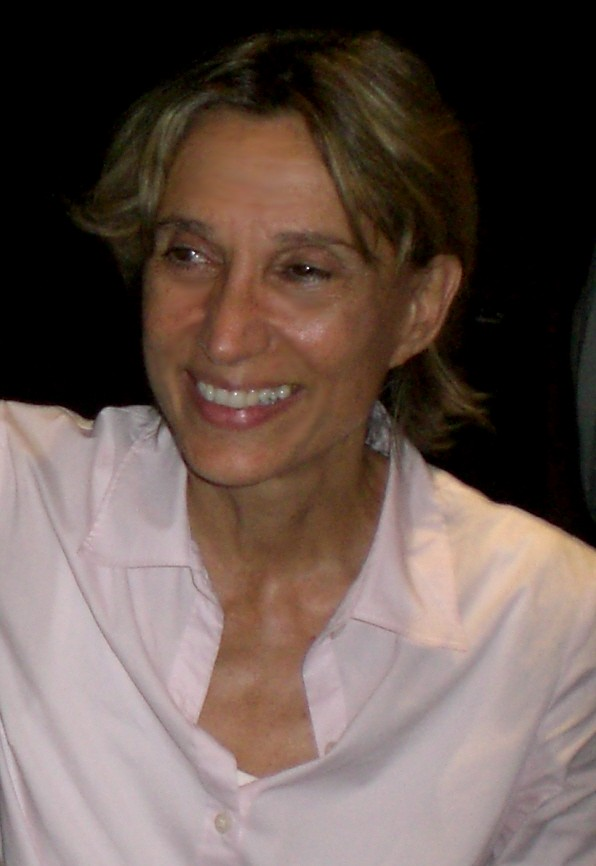
Fina Torres in 2010

In her 1993 article, the American scholar of Venezuelan cinema, Karen Schwartzman, determines that female Venezuelan directors are not a unified group as in other film cultures, and a distinction based on gender is completely arbitrary.^{:33} Most notably, throughout the industry's history there seems to be no gender discrimination, allowing female filmmakers as many opportunities and as much success as any man.^{:34-35} Schwartzman also notes how many Venezuelan women filmmakers were not, during her investigations in the early 1990s, in any contact with other women of the same profession; though she adds that this was on the presumption that there were no other female filmmakers, suggesting a mental perception of discrimination.^{:33} There has been a feminist film collective in Venezuela: Grupo Feminista Miércoles (English: Feminist Group Wednesday), founded in 1978.^{:36}

Schwartzman reports that in Venezuelan film history, there have been 45 female directors with a collective 75 works. The nation has the third-highest percentage of female filmmakers, after Argentina and Brazil, and the number and output of these creators followed national trends through its cinematic history.^{:33} Schwartzman described the contribution of female filmmakers to the national identity as "significant".^{:34}

There are films created in the 1910s and 20s by Prudencia Grifell, a Spanish-born actress who formed a production company called Nostra, serving many roles in front of and behind the camera,^{:42, 49}. In the modern era the first female Venezuelan filmmaker is Margot Benacerraf. Benacerraf made two films, the short Reverón (1952) and the feature Araya (1959); they are considered landmarks, and may be viewed as prototypical of New Latin American Cinema.^{:34} Araya won some of the nation's earliest international accolades including the 1959 Cannes International Critics Prize. In 1965, Benacerraf became the director of cultural activities at Museo Bellas Artes, helping to reinvigorate arts in the nation after the civil wars of the early 1960s.^{:34} However, the 1960s was not particularly fruitful in regards to film in general, with only one known film created by a woman in the decade, an ethnographic film by anthropologist María Mathilde Suárez about the Warao people.^{:35}

Benefitting from the oil boom of the 1970s, a female filmmaker called María Lourdes Carbonell received state funding for three feature films. In all, Lourdes produced seven films between 1970 and 1976, before emigrating to Greece; this achievement in creativity is seen by Schwartzman as remarkable for anyone.^{:35} Also coming to prominence in the 1970s was Solveig Hoogesteijn, a Swedish immigrant who created films with a lot of national sentiment, including typical coastal settings and featuring magical realism.^{:35} Women working in short films in the decade include Silvia Manrique, Marilda Vera, Fina Torres, Betty Kaplan, and Ana Cristina Henríquez; Liliane Blaser set up an experimental workshop, creating films focusing on Super 8 film, including Apocalípsis no, ¡urbanismo!, an early look at environmental issues in Caracas.^{:36}

Also in the 1970s, the political film group Cine Urgente was founded by Jacobo Borges; two women who later helped found Grupo Miércoles were members: Josefina Jordán and Franca Donda.^{:35} These women and Josefina Acevedo made films that were significant politically and culturally at the time, like ¡Sí, Podemos!. Another film, María de la Cruz is considered by Schwartzman to be the first Venezuelan film by women about women, critically looking at the experiences of the titular woman in society.^{:36} All three were founders of Grupo Miércoles, along with Carmen Luisa Cisneros, Ambretta Marrosu, Vincenzina Marotta, and Giovanna Merola; the group's first major work was an audiovisual presentation, Las alfareras de lomas bajas, in 1980.^{:36}

Torres, Vera, and Hoogesteijin each produced notable works in the 1980s,^{:37-38} with the newer Haydee Ascanio creating another women's film in 1987, Unas son de amor, looking at controversial abortion issues. Also released this year was what could be considered one of the nation's greatest and most successful films, Hoogesteijin's Macu, The Policeman's Woman, which notably took in more at the Venezuelan box office than films like Superman and E.T. the Extra-Terrestrial — Schwartzman writes about how the film creates and disrupts feminists narratives in the story of Macu and her relationship with Ismael.^{:38}

Throughout the 1980s were multiple political short films, with some female directors venturing into animation. In 1989, María Eugenia Martínez created the animated film Febrero, deemed an accurate representation of the Caracazo; in the same year, Haydee Pino made La ventana and Diálogo, looking at female and transvestite sexuality.^{:40} Despite the downturn, female filmmakers continued to make political short films in the 1990s, with more focus on riots and el Caracazo, like Blaser's Venezuela, 27 de febrero and La otra mirada.^{:41}

In 1994 Of Love and Shadows, an adaptation of a Chilean novelist Isabel Allende book, the director Betty Kaplan gave Spanish actor Antonio Banderas his first English-language movie role; introducing Banderas to Hollywood.

Elia Schneider directed Huelepega (1999), Punto y Raya (2004), Un Lugar Lejano (2009), Desautorizados (2010) and Tamara (2016). She was nominated four times for the Venezuelan Official Selection to the Academy Awards. Mariana Rondón is a laureated director and writer, known for Pelo Malo (2013), Postcards from Leningrad (2007) and At Midnight and a Half (2000).

Another work of women's film was an experimental documentary produced by the British Channel 4. Mónica Henríquez's Crónicas ginecológicas, based on a book by Elisa Lerner, looks at the changing station of Venezuelan women in the 1930s and 40s.^{:42}

In 2009 Efterpi Charalambidis directed Libertador Morales, El Justiciero, her first feature-length film, was the Venezuelan Official Submission to the Academy Awards 2010 for Best Foreign Language Film. Alejandra Szeplaki directed her opera prima Dia Naranja.

In 2015 the film The Longest Distance, directed by Claudia Pinto, released in August 2014, won the award for Best Ibero-American First Film at the second edition of the Platino Awards.

More recently, Gabriela Rodríguez became the first Latin American woman to be nominated for Best Picture at the Academy Awards for producing Alfonso Cuarón's Roma. She also won two BAFTAs and a British Independent Film Award, as well as other nominations for her production work on the film

== Facilities ==
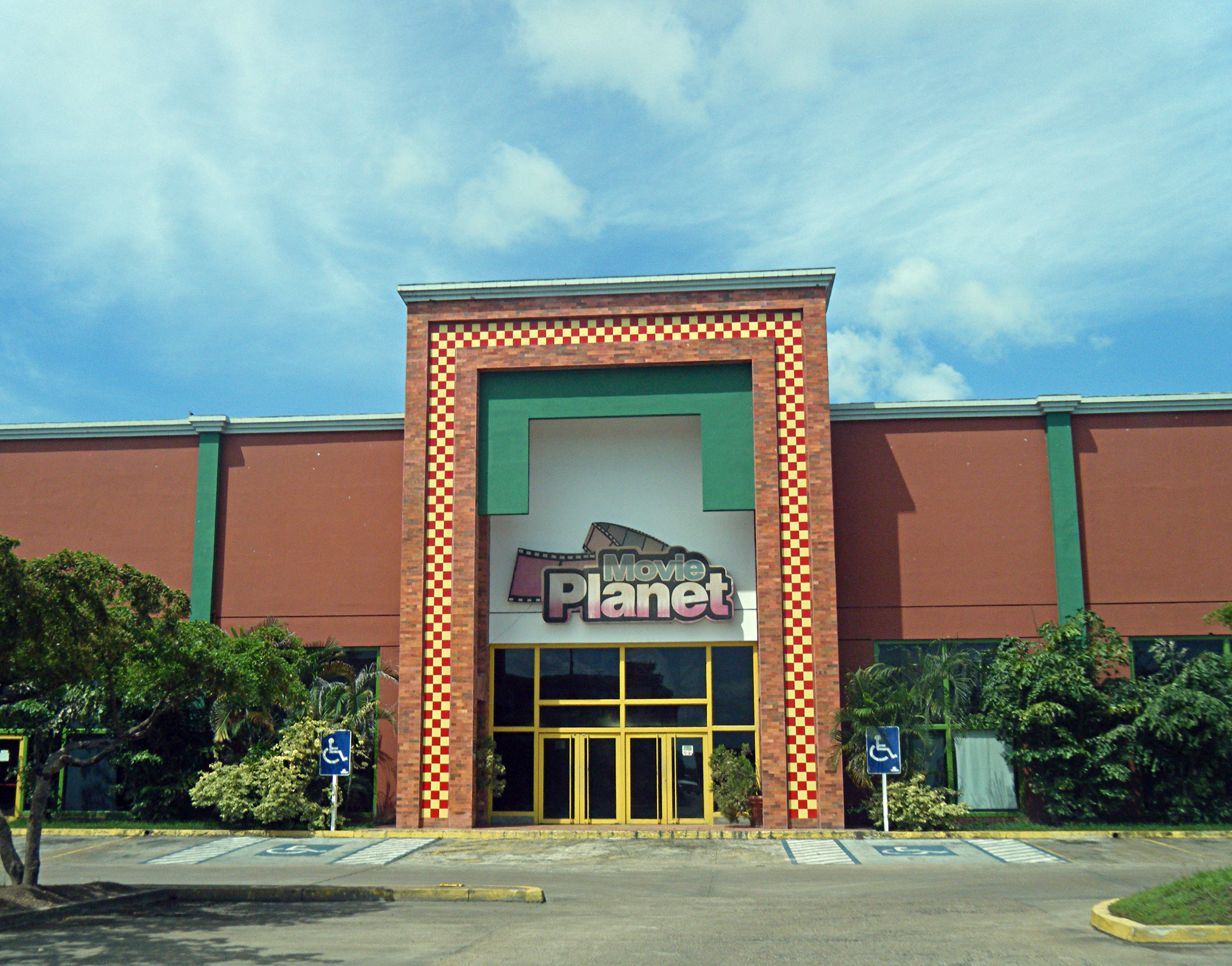
A Movie Planet cinema in Maturín

The total number of cinema facilities in Venezuela in 2013 was 125; this is slightly up from the previous year, but still almost half of the figure in 2010. The number of total cinema screens, however, was the highest it has been in UNESCO records at 481, due to the steady increase in multiplex facilities. There were 84,493 cinema seats in the country this year, again a record, with the number of seats per screen consistently averaging ~180.

Variety stated in 2017 that, while cinemas typically rely on concession stands to make a profit, popcorn and hot-dog buns are particularly scarce. The 2017 Venezuelan protests also affected cinemas after four Caracas cinema facilities were tear gassed by the government. However, the article pitted such barriers to cinema profit against the peoples' rising "demand for escapist fare".

The organisation Gran Cine operates free film festivals, with public mobile cinemas across the country, to enable more people to watch films from around the world.

== Viewership and economy ==
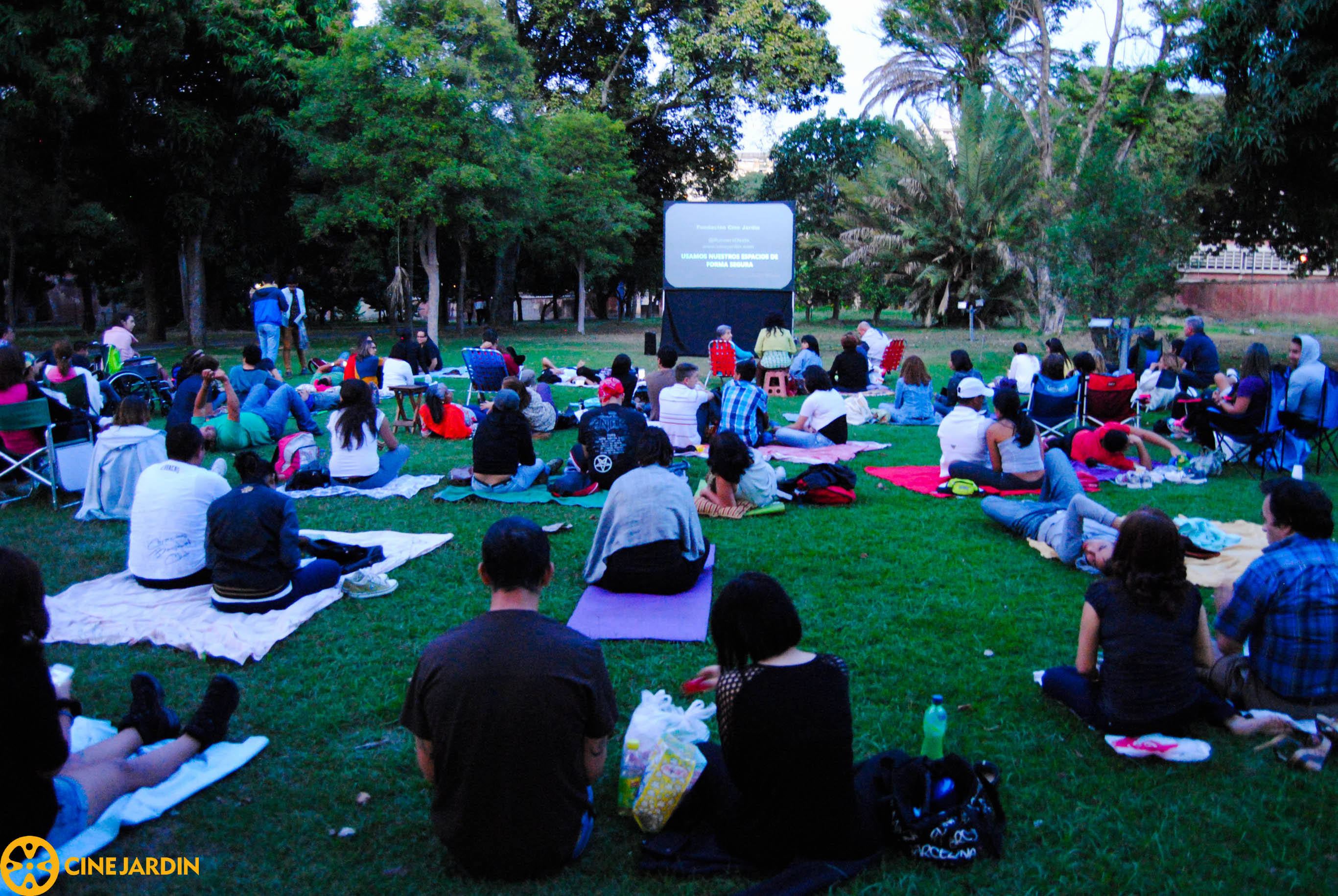
Filmgoers at an open-air cinema screening in 2015

In 2013, a total of 286 feature films were screened in Venezuela, a massive decrease from only a few years earlier in 2008, which saw 783 features play. The percentage of these that were national, i.e. Venezuelan-produced, was 21.7%; an increase on 2008's 9.3%, resulting in not much difference in real number. Despite the great reductions in both cinemas and films, the box office admissions in 2013 was 30,069,381; this number follows a steady increase in viewership that hasn't wavered. However, though almost 22% of all films were national, these only saw 2,429,560 admissions, about 8% of the total. The box office gross took leaps in 2013, though this may be attributed to the changes in currency value over only a few years affecting the numbers where it wouldn't in countries with a more stable economy: the 2008 average ticket price was 10 bolívares, and in 2013 it was 47. Below is a chart plotting the box office from 2009 to 2013 in US dollars when adjusted for inflation. (Note: The box office figures are taken from the UNESCO Institute for Statistics, reading 391,761,546 (2009); 460,858,430 (2010); 680,759,956 (2011); 1,048,333,985 (2012); 1,418,436,623 (2013) in bolívares. The inflation (and conversion) statistics are taken from XE currency charts, using the end of year rate, reading 0.46512 (2009); 0.23256 (2010); 0.23256 (2011); 0.15905 (2012); 0.15913 (2013).) The attendance frequency also rose to its highest, with every person in Venezuela averaging 1.1 visits.

In the following years, according to an article from 2017, the cost of marketing films during periods of hyperinflation particularly prevented exports to the nation, increasing the pirate DVD rates and in some periods decreasing cinema attendance.

Box Office in USD, adjusted for inflation

Despite rising ticket prices and reasonably steady viewership, Venezuelan cinema as an industry still makes a loss. Director Carlos Malavé explained in 2018 that "evidently, the Venezuelan cinema does not work", that "making a standard film in Venezuela [is] a lot of money compared with the return you'll get", and that "the market doesn't exist" for films in the country on the scale it does in others. A similar situation has been present for much of the industry's history, propped up by government funding, since the development of production companies in the 1960s; a Venezuelan film history review explains that most of these fell to idleness after only one film, unable to keep going with the financial losses, blaming this on exhibitioners only being interested in foreign films. Of course, one reason why the loss is so great every year is due to the amount of money put forward by the government projects to support national film; in 2005 Roman Chalbaud received 3 billion bolivares to produce El Caracazo, more than double the entire national box office revenue for a year.

== Organizations ==
=== Centro Nacional Autónomo de Cinematografía ===
The Centro Nacional Autónomo de Cinematografía (English: Autonomous National Centre for Filmmaking; CNAC) is the governing body of film public policy in Venezuela. Its primary functions are to promote and support the production and distribution of national film, which it does by awarding financial grants to productions with directors who are Venezuelan citizens or legal residents. In 2017, the government of Nicolás Maduro appointed a new chair to the CNAC, Aracelis García, a government minister.

== Production companies ==
- Estudios Avila
- Bolívar Films
- CEDESA
- Froid International
- La Faena Films
- Gente de Cine
- Primeras Voces
- Tiuna Films
- Tres Venezuela
- Unidad Filmica Shell
- Villa del Cine

== Festivals and awards ==
Venezuela has several film festivals, with some of the most often, prominent, and important being:

- Venezuelan Film Festival: Held in Mérida and operating since 2001, it is for feature films produced in Venezuela or by Venezuelans. It was previously held in Caracas until 1987. The national festival was restarted based on its original mandate.
- Manuel Trujillo Durán National Short Film Festival: Held in Maracaibo and operating since 1981, named after Manuel Trujillo Durán.
- Margarita Latin American and Caribbean Film Festival: It has been held since 2009 on Margarita Island, and shows not only Venezuelan films, but also those from around Latin American and the Caribbean. It is for short and feature films, as well as other experimental mediums.
- Festival de Cine Entre Largos y Cortos de Oriente (ELCO): Held since 2011 in Puerto la Cruz, originally for showing films made in Eastern Venezuela, which is less populated and had less opportunities, but now is another independent alternative for all Venezuelan cinema.
- Barquisimeto National Short Film Festival: Since 2004.
- International Festival of Young Peoples' Cinema (FICAIJ): Held since 2010 in Mérida as an exhibition space for audiovisual works aimed at or made by children and adolescents. It also provides meeting space for filmmakers and educators interested in the topic of children's cinema, training space, and facilities for family entertainment.
- Maracay International Film and Video Festival (MIFVIF)
- The Day is Short International Independent Short Film Festival
- Marialionza Women's Film Festival
- Five Continents International Film Festival (FICOCC)
- Caracas Ibero-American Film Festival

=== Awards ===
- Soto Awards or ACACV Awards: the Venezuelan Academy of Film Arts and Sciences (ACACV) was opened in 2017 to recognise the best of cinematographic talent shown in the country, presenting its first awards in 2018.
- Premio Nacional de Cine (National Cinema Award), awarded by the Ministry of Culture as a lifetime achievement award for someone working in national cinema.
- The ANAC Awards, held by the National Association of Cinema Authors, the country's main guild of people working in the industry.
- The Municipal Film Award, presented by the Education and Culture Commission of the Caracas district.

=== Former festivals ===
- Caracas Student Short Film Festival (VIART): Operated from 1991 to 2011, with 15 editions in this time, it was a point of reference for the future successes of young filmmakers across Latin America. The festival was free and hosted workshops as well as screenings.
- Spirit of Venezuelan Film Festival (FESCIVE): It began in 2011 in Ciudad Guayana, seeking to highlight the values of Venezuela. At the festival the SIGNIS prize was awarded for the first time in Venezuela, along with the festival's own awards. It was open to international entries.
- Festival Venezolano de Cine de la Diversidad (FESTDIVQ): LGBTQ+ film festival that ran from 2011 to 2017.
- Caracas International Short Film Festival (Chorts)

=== Foreign festivals for Venezuelan films ===
- Venezuelan Film Festival in New York (VEFF)
- Cinema Venezuela Miami
- Festival du Cinéma Vénézuélien en France (Venezuelan Film Festival in France)
- Festival Venezuela im Film (Venezuelan Film Festival in Germany)
- La Muestra Spanish New Venezuelan Film Festival
- Buenos Aires Venezuelan Film Festival (FECIVE BSAS)
- Santiago de Chile Venezuelan Film Festival

== See also ==
- List of Venezuelan films
