= Two Autumns in Paris =

2019 film by Gibelys Coronado

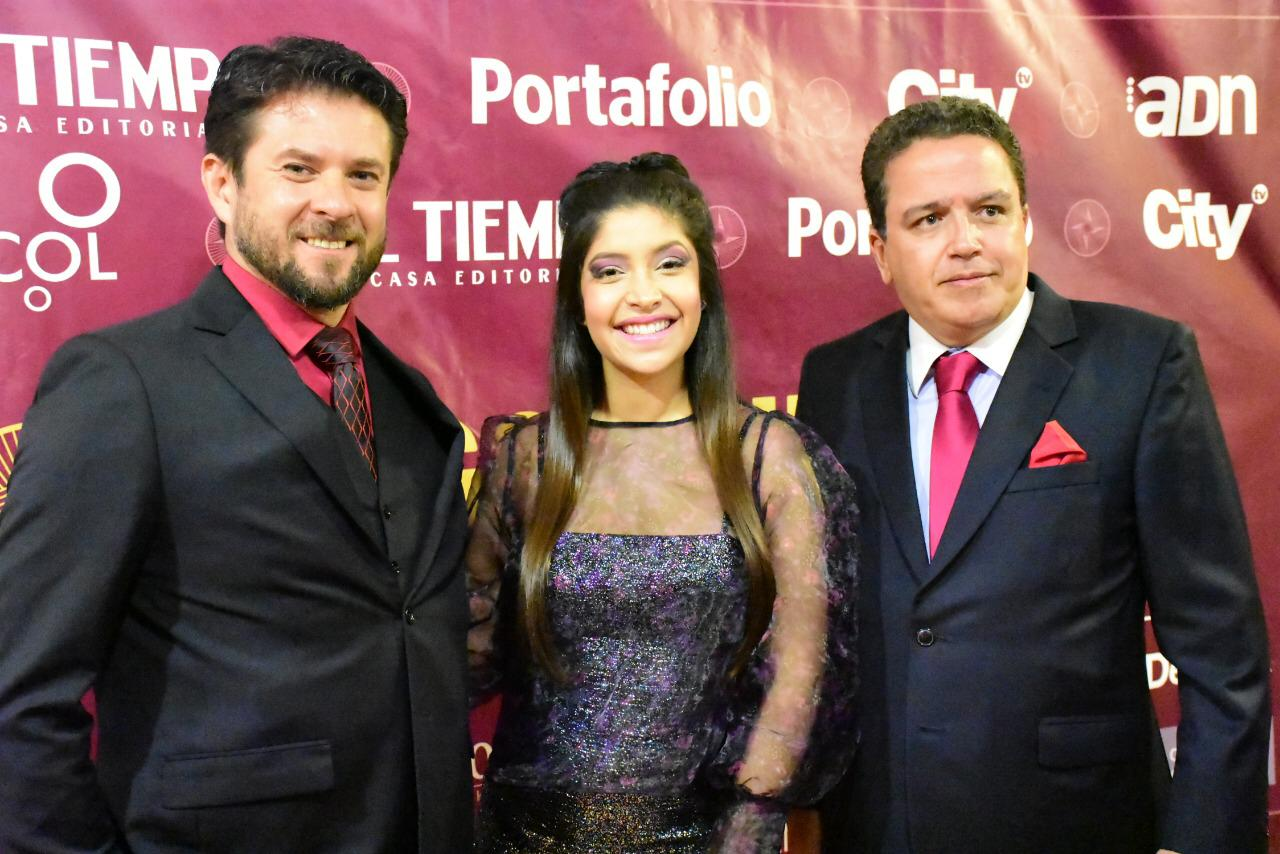
- (Left to Right) Jorge Melo, María Antonieta Hidalgo, and Francisco Villarroel at 2019 Bogotá International Film Festival
- Spanish: Dos otoños en París
- Directed by: Gibelys Coronado
- Written by: Francisco Villarroel
- Screenplay by: Gustavo Michelena; Francisco Villarroel
- Story by: Francisco Villarroel
- Based on: Dos otoños en París, historia de una refugiada by Francisco Villarroel
- Produced by: Francisco Villarroel
- Starring: María Antonieta Hidalgo; Francisco Villarroel; Slavko Sorman; Raúl Amundaray; Sonia Villamizar
- Cinematography: Jhonny Febres
- Edited by: Daniel Carrillo; Luisana Castillo
- Music by: Axel Berasain
- Production company: MOB Producciones
- Distributed by: Cines Unidos; Filmhub
- Release date: October 16, 2019 (Bogota)
- Running time: 100 minutes
- Countries: Venezuela, Canada
- Language: Spanish

Two Autumns in París (Spanish: Dos otoños en París) is a 2019 Venezuelan-Canadian drama film directed by Gibelys Coronado, based on a novel of the same name by writer Francisco Villarroel.

The film was premiered at the Bogotá Film Festival on October 16, 2019. The film was shown for the first time in Venezuela, at the press conference of Miradas Diversas - 1er. Human Rights Film Festival, November 27, 2019. It was presented at the opening ceremony of the Guayaquil International Film Festival, on September 19, 2020.

It was the final screen performance of Venezuelan actor Raúl Amundaray, who had come out of retirement to play the character of the Ambassador.

== Synopsis ==
The movie tells the love story of Maria Teresa (María Antonieta Hidalgo) and Antonio (Slavko Sorman) when they were young. Many years later Antonio (Francisco Villarroel) arrives in Paris, facing memories of an unforgettable love that scarred him forever and changed the course of his life. He is in Paris to speak at a conference about human rights and in the journey from the airport to the event hall, he reconstructs his past romance with the beautiful Maria Teresa, a young Paraguayan, a political refugee who escaped from her country to save herself from the criminal repression of the dictatorship of the bloodthirsty general Alfredo Stroessner. In Paraguay, Maria Teresa was a member of a university student political group, opposed to the dictatorship, whose leader was her boyfriend Ramon. One night, when they were involved in a clandestine activity, they were detained by the regime's military police and locked in a prison. Maria Teresa and Antonio fell in love and even thought of having a child. They decided to live together, and Antonio changed his ways, María Teresa transformed him; in the end, she had to decide between her present love and her past.

== Cast ==
- María Antonieta Hidalgo as María Teresa
- Francisco Villarroel as Old Antonio
- Slavko Sorman as Young Antonio
- Raúl Amundaray as Ambassador
- Sonya Villamizar as Antonio's Mother
- Juan Belgrave as Oswaldo
- Alberto Rowinski as Don Manuel
- Jorge Melo as Jean Claude
- Ramón Roa as Captain Martinez

== Awards ==
Festival	Year	Award
Prague International Film Festival	2020	Best Feature Film

The film won the 2022 Venezuelan Academy of Cinematographic Arts and Sciences Award for Best Music. The film was nominated for best picture at the Guayaquil International Film Festival, at the 13th edition of the Dominican Global Film Festival and at the 12nd edition of the Latinuy Latin Festival.

== General bibliography ==
- Giménez, Carlos (1983). "Film venezolano recrea el horror durante la dictadura paraguaya", in Periódico La Nación. Asunción, Paraguay, December 15, 2019.
- Ministerio del Poder Popular para la Comunicación y la Información (February 5, 2020). Venezuela participa en el Festival de Cine Global RD. Caracas.
- Villarroel Sneshko, Mary (August 21, 2020). "La película venezolana Dos Otoños en París lleva más de 80 premios internacionales", in Revista OceanDrive. Caracas.
