= Franca Donda =

Italian photographer

- Born: 3 September 1933; Gorizia, Italy
- Died: 3 September 2017 (aged 84); Gorizia, Italy
- Occupations: Photographer, filmmaker
- Relatives: Claudia Chacón
- Awards: Josefa Camejo Order (Venezuela)

Franca Donda (3 September 1933-3 September 2017) was an Italian photographer and filmmaker. Residing in Venezuela, and working as a photographer, laboratorian and videographer, Donda made an important part of the photographic and audiovisual record of the history of 20th century feminism in the country along with the Uruguayan photographer Gladys Parentelli.

Donda was co-founder of the feminist group Miércoles, which lasted from 1978 to 1989. She has been described as one of the best black and white laboratorians in Venezuela in the 1970s. She was awarded the Josefa Camejo Order by the Center for Women's Studies of the Central University of Venezuela, although Franca declined the honor.

== Biography ==
She studied languages in London and Paris, and in 1957 she moved to Latin America, first to Venezuela, then to Cuba and then back to Venezuela.

Along with Uruguayan photographer Gladys Parentelli, Donda made an important part of the photographic and audiovisual record of the history of 20th century feminism in Venezuela. Through photography and film, she sought to make women aware of themselves, developing the rolls with a silver gelatin-bromide base. She was part of the Caracas Urgente project, coordinated by Jacobo Borges, where she made Sí podemos. With Josefina Jordán, she made the film María de la Cruz, una mujer venezolana (1975).

Her photographs were included in the book Cinco encuentros internacionales de creadores, as a close collaborator of the dancer and choreographer Hercilia López and her group Contradanza, for which she was its photographer since 1983. She participated in the First International Creators Meeting in the Gran Sabana (1991) for which she made the video Al Paují. In 1986 she also made, along with the choreographer, the video La dama de negro.

Donda was co-founder of the feminist group Miércoles (Spanish: Wednesday) in 1978, composed in its first stage by Ambretta Marrossu, Tamara Marrosu, Carmen Luisa Cisneros, Katina Fantini, Cathy Rakowsky, Ana Amundaray, Miriam Gonzalez and Christa Sponsel. With this collective -so called because of the days when they met at Donda's residence in Caracas- she made the documentary Yo, tú, Ismaelina (1981), the videos on Argelia Laya (Argelia Laya, 1987), Eumelia Hernández (Eumelia, calle arriba, calle abajo, 1988) and Inés Marcano (Inés María Marcano, una del montón, 1988).

She has also been credited in the collection of the Reina Sofia Museum in Madrid with the photographs of Paolo Gasparini, a prominent 20th century Venezuelan photographer whom she married, which had been copied by her. The collection was purchased with funds donated by Venezuelans Tanya Capriles, Solita Cohen, María Amalia León, Pilar Lladó, Diana López, Patricia Phelps de Cisneros and Guillermo Penso. The collection was purchased with funds donated by Venezuelans Tanya Capriles, Solita Cohen, María Amalia León, Pilar Lladó, Diana López, Patricia Phelps de Cisneros and Guillermo Penso.

She refused to receive honors or tributes as she considered that she did her work to transform the world and not to be rewarded, including when the Women's Studies Center of the Central University of Venezuela conferred her the Josefa Camejo Order; by then, she asked her colleague Gioconda Espina to help her write a few lines explaining the decision, arguing that it should not be awarded to individuals but to the collectives that made the work of women possible.

Franca Donda has been described as one of the best black and white laboratorians in Venezuela in the 1970s. Film critic Ambretta Marrosu wrote about her: “As a whole, these are materials from which emotions, unresolved problems and disturbing revelations emerge. The political concern for socialism intersects with a basic, existential feminism, where the interesting thing is that the first is absorbed by the second, passing through the insistent and specific feminine voice”.

She died in her hometown Gorizia in 2017, after having lived most of her life outside of it.

== Personal life ==
Donda married Paolo Gasparini in 1957, a prominent 20th century Venezuelan photographer. The two later divorced, but they maintained a close friendship with until her death.

== Awards ==
- Award for best short film and best cinematography for the 16 mm documentary Yo, tú, Ismaelina, granted by the Municipal Council of the Federal District in 1981. Director of photography and camera: Josefina Acevedo and Franca Donda. Editing: Josefina Acevedo, Franca Donda, Carmen Luisa Cisneros and Ambretta Marrosu.
- Josefa Camejo Order (Center for Women's Studies of the Central University of Venezuela)
