= Diana López =

Diana López may refer to:

- Diana López (taekwondo) (born 1984), American Olympic taekwondo competitor
- Diana López (artist) (born 1968), Venezuelan visual artist
- Diana López (footballer) (born 1993), Nicaraguan footballer
- Diana López Moyal, Cuban musician
