= Luis Manuel Molina =

Cuban musician (born 1959)

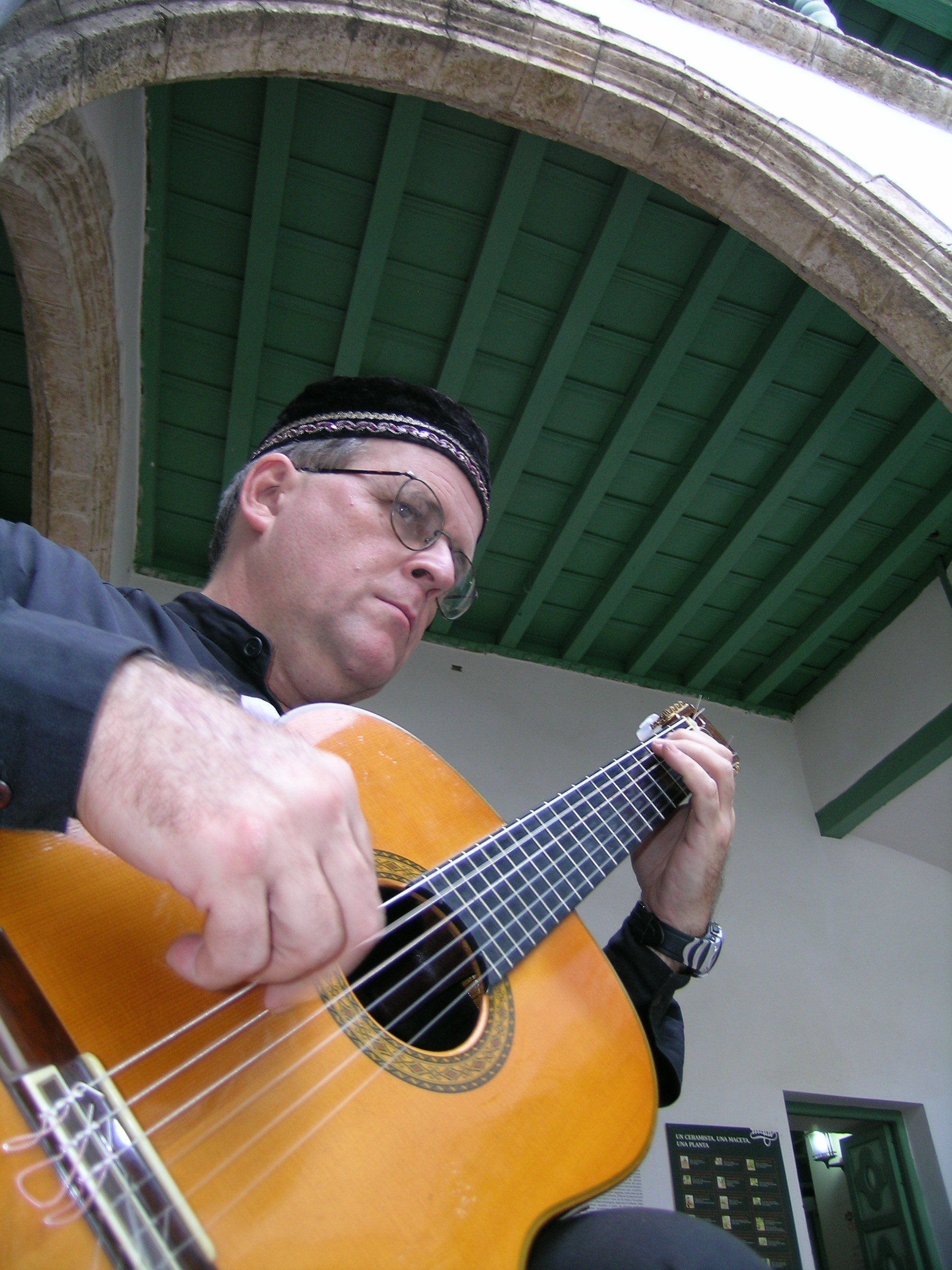
- Concert in the Fine arts museum, 2012, Havana
- Born: February 25, 1959 (age 67); Havana, Cuba
- Education: Superior Institute of Art (ISA) of Havana
- Occupations: Composer, Classical guitarist, arrangement, musical director, broadcaster, radio producer
- Spouse: Vilma Alonso
- Musical career
- Genre: Classical
- Years active: 1979-present

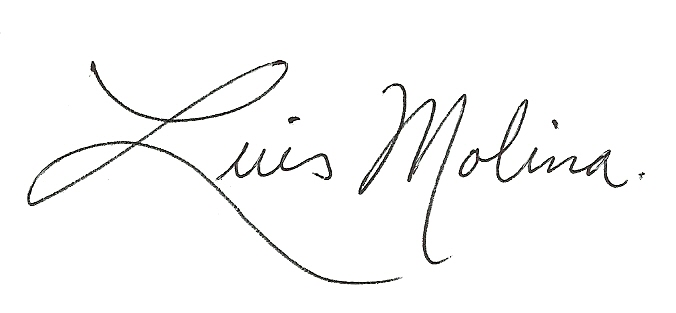

Luis Manuel Molina de Varona (born February 25, 1959) is a Cuban musician, concert guitarist, composer, arranger, musical director, broadcaster and radio producer.

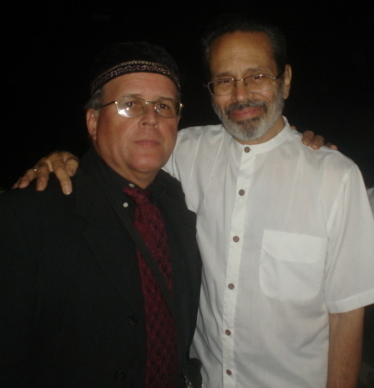
On the left Luis Manuel Moilna and on the right Leo Brouwer

== Biography ==
Luis Manuel Molina was born in Havana, Cuba, on February 25, 1959. He studied the average level in the Amadeo Roldan Conservatory with Professor Flores Chaviano, and graduated with a Bachelor of Music degree, specializing in guitar at the Instituto Superior de Arte (ISA) in Havana with professors Carlos Molina (Molina's brother), Isaac Nicola and Jesus Ortega. Molina received master classes from important figures such as Leo Brouwer, Alirio Díaz, Ichiro Suzuki, Costas Cotsiolis, Manolo Sanlúcar and Monica Rost.

== Compositions ==
=== Mixed choir ===
- La balada azul, 1979
- Las Bienaventuranzas, 1993
- Te doy gracias, 1994
- Ave María, 1997

=== Mixed choir and orchestra ===
- Cantata gesta luminosa, 1988

=== Solo guitar ===
- Romance para dos almas, 1979
- Capricho místico para una guitarra solitaria, 1986
- Serenata del Ángel, 1990
- Tres evocaciones españolas, 1992
- Externsteine, 1992
- Bocetos de ultramar, 1994
- Oración y Tarantella Fantástica, 1998
- Sonata No.1 "El Valle de los Templos", 1998–99
- Adagio para el Gentilhombre de Aranjuez, 1999
- Poema Idílico, 2000
- Balada para el Caballero, 2002
- Sgt. Pepper's Fancy, 2002
- Vals para una Ninfa, 2005
- Oricalco, 2006

=== Two guitars ===
- Talismán y Arabescos, 1995

=== Three guitars ===
- Souvenir de Aha-u-sen, 1991

=== Four guitars ===
- Divertimento, 1992

=== Guitar orchestra ===
- Fantasía para la Dama del Lago Bullensee, 1995
- Ofrenda para una flor, 1995
- Taj Mahal, Idilio de los Amantes, 2002
- Sinfonía de Gilgamés, 2008–09

=== Clarinet and guitar ===
- El Hada de los Sortilegios, 2007

=== Piano solo ===
- Preludio y Toccata, 1979

=== Chamber music ===
- Un otoño en Weimar, 1982, para flauta recorder y dos guitarras
- La música de la casa de nadie, 1989 para flauta, oboe, clarinete, corno francés y guitarra.
- Pastoral y danza rustica, 1992
- Suite cubana, 1993
- Como un ángel cruzando por mi ventana..., 1996
- Oración por los cinco, 2013

=== Incidental music ===
- La gata que iba sola, 1988
- Peter Pan, 1990

His works have been published in the Editorial Alpuerto of Madrid, Spain and Nogatz Verlag Hubertus Editorial Düsseldorf, Germany.

== Activities as guitarist and composer ==
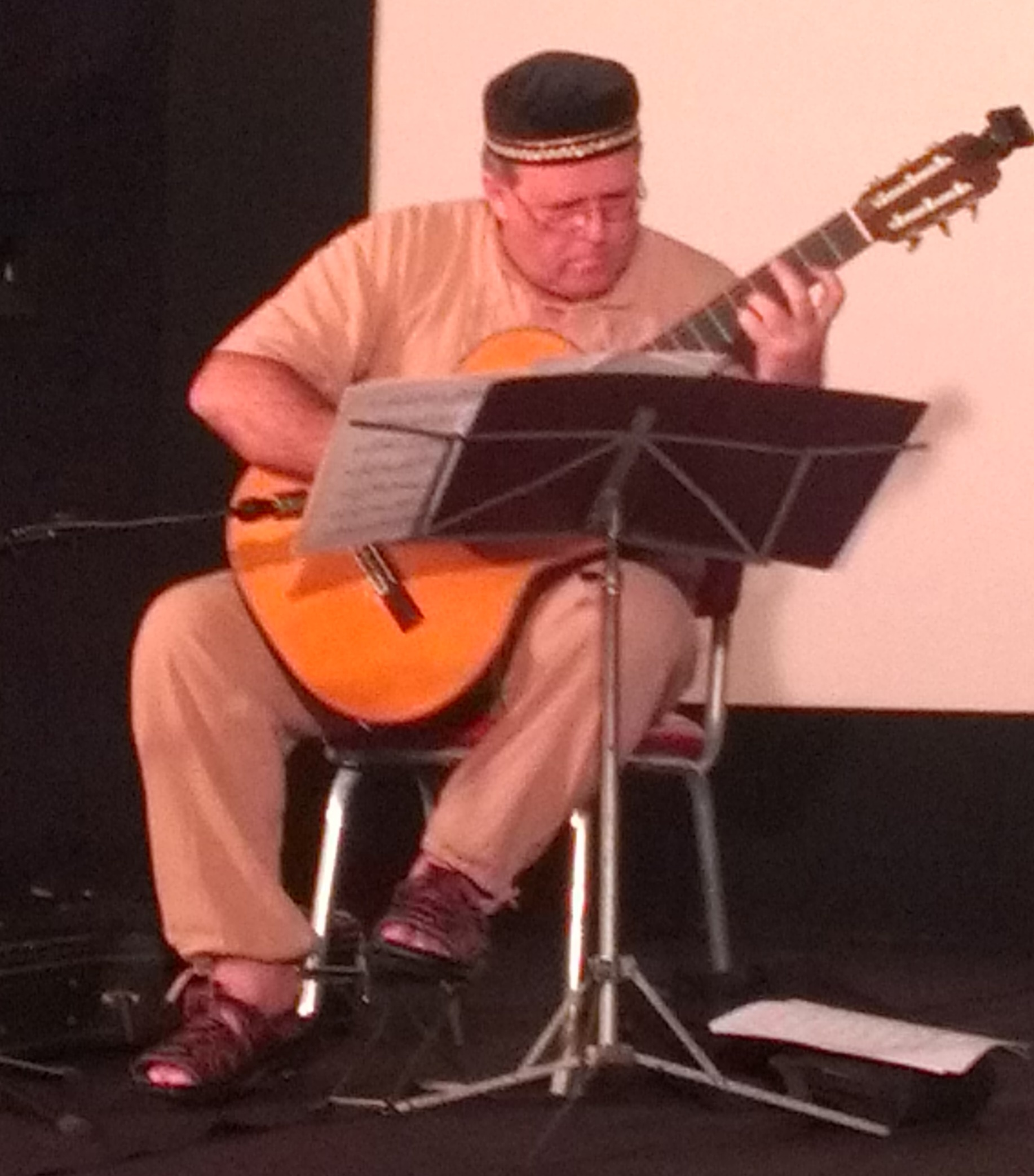
Concert in the "International School of Cinema and Television" in Cuba

He participated as musical arranger and performer in the Holy Mass celebrated in Havana on the visit of Pope John Paul II (1998) and again played similar roles in the Mass celebrated in the capital by Pope Benedict XVI (2012). He directs, writes and conducts two specialized radio programs in music, Radio Musical Nacional CMBF. These programs are: Early Music and Friends of the Guitar. He also directs and writes the musicians section in Time on the same station. He is co-author of The Beatles in Cuba, Havana (February 1998).

He has published numerous articles in journals such as the Journal of country WAVE Marti Studies Center. Write (weekly) the notes to the programs of the National Symphony Orchestra of Cuba. In April 1993 his "Divertimento" was performed by the Guitar Orchestra of the Conservatory of Shenandoah (Virginia), USA. His Symphony of Gilgamesh was released in Cuba at the Teatro Amadeo Roldán for Guitar Orchestra Rheine (Germany) and the Habanera Sonantas Orchestra (July 26, 2009). Also Rheine Guitar Orchestra of Germany has included in his album Live Fancy composition for the Lady of the Lake Bullensee.

He participated in the Festival of Contemporary Music Havana (in 2007, 2008, 2009 and 2010). Performing as a soloist at festivals XXI, XXI and XXIII of The Footprint of Spain starred in the 60th Anniversary Gala for the Foundation of the National Ballet of Cuba (Teatro Amadeo Roldan, October 2008). He performed in the Gala for the 50th Anniversary of UNEAC Foundation in the presence of the President of the Republic of Cuba, Raúl Castro Ruz, and prominent personalities of the National Culture. I act in the Gala for the 25th Anniversary of the Foundation of the Spanish Ballet of Havana. He did the art direction and participated as a performer in the concert "From Me to You", dedicated to Sir George Martin, in which Molina released his solo guitar composition "Sgt Pepper's Fancy", written especially for the occasion and dedicated to Martin (Havana, November 2002). With his group Magical Beat, he participated in music festivals held in the Beatles Sandals Royal Hicacos Hotel (Varadero, Matanzas) in 2011 and 2012 as a session musician, participated in the recordings of the albums Expedition by Cuban singer-songwriter Silvio Rodríguez, and Songs of Good Love by José María Vitier. The Glauber Rocha room International School of Film and Television, in San Antonio de los Baños (Cuba), has served as the setting for several of his concerts as a classical guitarist.

== Director of musical groups ==
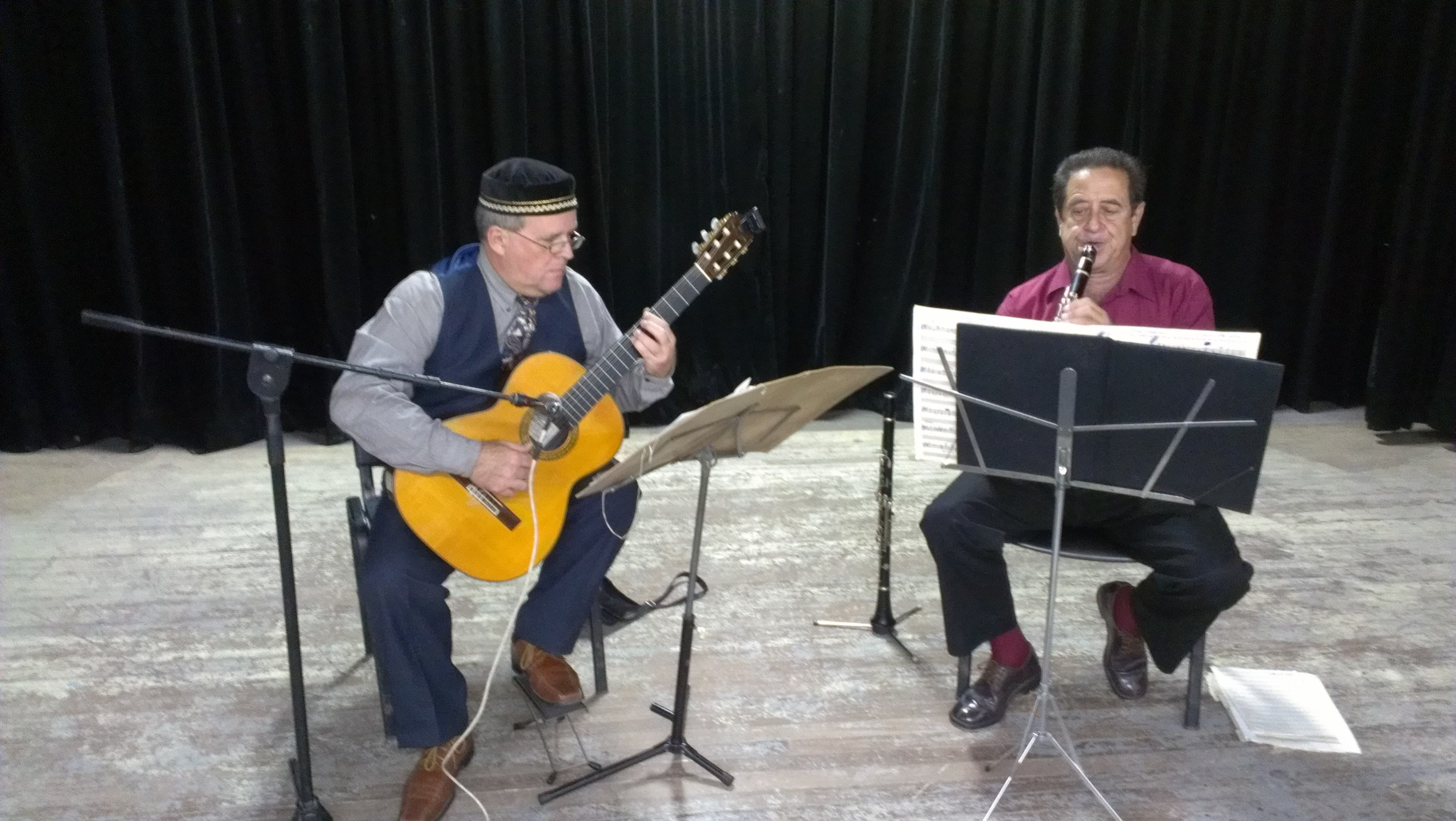
Duo Caliz "Luis Manuel Molina" and "Visente Monterrey"

- Géminis (grupo de rock sinfónico)
- Cuarteto Orfeo
- Cuarteto Metamorfosis
- Quinteto Eclosión
- Magical Beat (grupo de cámara-rock)

== International competitions, festivals and concerts ==
- Hungary (1979, 1981): International Guitar Concours of Esztergom and Keszthely.
- Nicaragua (1981): Participation in the premiere of the work Canto General by Mikis Theodorakis, under the composer's direction.
- Czechoslovakia(1982, 1988): Interpodium International Festival of Bratislava and International Festival of Ostrava.
- Germany (1982, 1985, 1990, 1992, 1995, 2002): he gave concerts and master classes in the International Festivals of Guitar of Markneukirchen and Rotenburg.
- Spain (1994,1995)> as member and Director of the "Duo Cáliz" with flutist Diana López Moyal in V International Festival of Guitar of Ponferrada (1994), also having a memorable performance in the Athenaeum of Madrid with public's success and critic. They both sustained work encounters with the teacher Joaquín Rodrigo. In 1995 he gave concerts in the city of Segovia.
- Poland (1988): Festival of Guitar Lodz.
- Italy (1993, 1994 y 1997): guitarist and mandolinista of the Company of Operetta of the Theater Bellini of Naples, in collaboration with the Theater of the Opera and the National Ballet of Cuba, Concerts in Naples, Torino, San Remus, Venice, Viterbo, Benevento, Vercelli, Salerno, Lecce, Bari, Ravenna, Bassano dei Grappa, Reggio Emilia, Vicenza, Riccione, Rosetto degli Abruzzi, Mestre, Rovigo, Bologna, Palermo, Catania, Agrigento, Trento, Brindisi, Ascoli Piceno, Sulmona, Senigallia, Modena, Ferrara, Ostuni and Caltanisetta.
- Canada (1995): Concerts in Toronto, Montreal and Ottawa. In this last city he gave a concert in Parliament, in the presence of numerous parliamentarians, political and cultural personalities.
- Venezuela (1995): in Caracas he gave a concert and master classes at Olga López’ Conservatory.
- Belgium (2005): he gave concerts in Brussels and Aalst, with repertoire fundamentally of their own responsibility, obtaining the public's firm success and the critic.
- Cayman Islands (2007): Concerts with the Duo Cáliz, featuring an entire program of the work of Austrian composer Franz Schubert.

== Tours and events ==
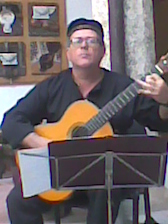
Concert in the Ceramic Museum in Havana

Molina has participated in diverse events in Cuba and abroad obtaining several recognitions:

- First prize in the competitions at the conservatories Alejandro García Caturla and Amadeo Roldán (1975, 1976 and 1977).
- Second prize in the Encounter of guitarists from Latin America and Caribbean made in the House of America (1978).
- IV International Festival of Ballet of Havana (Cuba), in the ballet Dances with the guitar of America (1978).
- Second Prize in the IV Competition and International Festival of Guitar of Esztergom, Hungary (1979).
- X International Festival Interforum, Hungary (1981).
- XII Festival Internacional Interpodium (Bratislava) Checoslovaquia (1982).
- International festival of Guitar of Ostrava, Czechoslovakia (1985).
- International festival of Guitar of Markneukirchen, Germany (1985).
- IV International Festival of Guitar of Lodz, Poland (1988).
- International festival of Guitar of Havana (1984, 1986 1991, 1996 and 2000)
- V International Festival of Guitar of Ponferrada, Spain (1994).
- International Rotenburg Guitar Festival, Rotenburger Gitarrenwoche, Germany (1990, 1992, 1995 and 2002).
- Italy: with the Company of Operettas of the Theater Bellini of Naples: (1993, 1994 and 1997) (as guitarist and mandolinista).
- Spain: concerts in Ponferrada and Madrid (1994) and in Segovia (1995).
- Canada: concerts in Ottawa, Montreal and Toronto (1995).
- Caracas, Venezuela: he/she offered a recital in the room of Olga's Conservatory López (1995).

== Distinctions ==
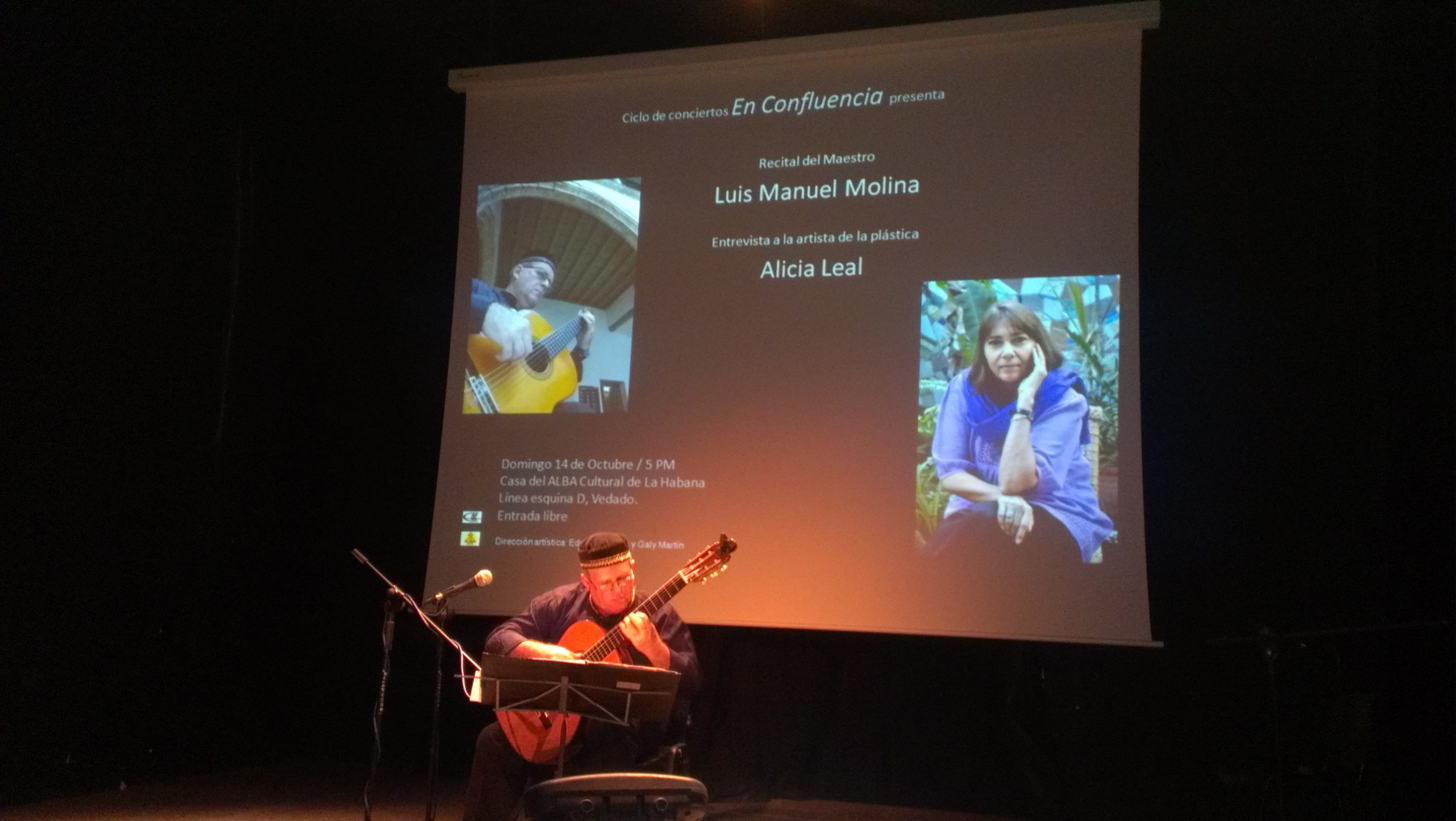
Concert in ALBA's House, Havana

He holds the title of Academician of the National Tango Academy of Argentina chaired by Horacio Ferrer, author of the texts of the songs of Astor Piazzolla. In 2000 Molina played in the inauguration of the statue of John Lennon in the park of the same name in Vedado, in the presence of the Commander in Chief Fidel Castro Ruz. He earned the distinction by the National Culture granted by the Ministry of Culture of the Republic of Cuba in 2002. It was included in the Encyclopedic Dictionary of Music in Cuba the Cuban musicologist as Radames Giro annual research award 2002 and Guitarists Encyclopedia, Francisco Herrera Spanish musicologist. Acquired medal commemorating the 50th Anniversary of the National Symphony Orchestra of Cuba and the Cuban Radio Microphone in 2010. In 2012 Condition was awarded the Artist of Merit (awarded by the ICRT in Cuba).

== Present time ==
He writes (weekly) program notes of the National Symphony Orchestra of Cuba. Directs, for 15 years with master clarinetist Vincent Monterrey, Duo Chalice. He directs, writes and conducts two specialized radio programs in music, Radio Musical Nacional CMBF. These programs are: Early Music and Friends of the Guitar. He also directs and writes the Musicians section in the same emisora Time.

== Bibliography ==
- The Spanish musicologist's guitarists Enciclopédia Francisco Herrera
- Encyclopedic Dictionary of the Music in Cuba. Radamés Giro, volume III. Cuban Institute of the Book. Cuban editorial Letters, 2009.
