= Olga Luzardo =

Venezuelan journalist and activist

Olga Luzardo (29 February 1916 – 19 September 2016) was a Venezuelan journalist, poet, and activist. She was a leader in the Communist Party of Venezuela, serving on as a member of the central committee and political bureau on several occasions throughout her 80 years of involvement in the party.

== Early life ==
Olga Luzardo was born in Paraguaipoa in Venezuela's Zulia state in 1916, although some sources have reported her birth year as 1918. Her parents were Aramis Luzardo y Margarita Finol.

At age 12, she became part of the first Marxist circles in Maracaibo's Baralt and Urdaneta plazas. Through the poet and educator Jesús Enrique Lossada, she was introduced to the works of Karl Marx, Maxim Gorky, Friedrich Engels, Nikolai Bukharin, and Vladimir Lenin.

She also joined the fight for women's rights in 1928, protesting mistreatment and workplace discrimination.

== Activism ==
Luzardo was a member of the Patriotic Women's Society, an organization of women that protested and fought against the dictatorship of Juan Vicente Gómez.

In 1931, along with Gabriel Bracho, Espartaco González, Isidro Valles, and others, she helped form the first cells of the Communist Party of Venezuela in the state of Zulia.

After Gómez's death in 1935, Luzardo began working to organize political groups among the oil workers. In 1936, she participated in the First Feminist Congress in Caracas, alongside Eumelia Hernández, Itala Reyes, Auxiliadora Soto, Margoth Díaz Urdaneta, Rosa Virginia Martínez, and other female activists fighting for women's suffrage. Later that year, she was one of the main organizers of the First Great Venezuelan Oil Strike.

In 1936, Luzardo founded the Agrupación Cultural Femenina, the Communist Party's first women's organization, which worked for international solidarity and equal political, social, and cultural rights for women. She remained deeply involved in the party, working on its central committee and to disseminate party materials across the country. She was a founder of the Women's International Democratic Federation in the 1940s, serving as Venezuela's first delegate to the organization and traveling to represent the country in the Soviet Union, Chile, Cuba, Hungary, Poland, Czechoslovakia, and other countries.

She received a degree in economics from the Central University of Venezuela in 1944. The following year, one of her primary fights came to fruition: Venezuelan women won the right to vote.

During the dictatorship of Marcos Pérez Jiménez, Luzardo was a founder and activist for the Unión de Muchachas Venezolanas (Union of Venezuelan Women), and she was a member of the resistance, operating under the pseudonym "Jorge." During this period, particularly in the 1950s, she was targeted with repression and mistreatment by the authorities: She was shot in the leg and later thrown in prison. After serving time in the San Carlos penitentiary in Cojedes state, in 1952 she was exiled to Mexico and the USSR. She returned to Caracas after the Jiménez dictatorship's fall in 1958.

On her return to Venezuela, she joined the Armed Forces of National Liberation guerrilla group, opposed to the democratically elected presidencies of Rómulo Betancourt and Raúl Leoni. Through the group, known as FALN, she led a high-profile raid of El Encanto train, known as "Operation Olga Luzardo" in 1963.

== Writing ==
Luzardo's early activism was paired with an early entry into the literary sphere. As a young woman, she worked with the poets Ely Saúl Rodríguez and Rosa Virginia Martínez, as well as the painter Antonio Angulo, to form an athenaeum in Maracaibo.

She had a long career as a journalist, publishing her first opinion articles in the Maracaibo newspaper Panorama in the 1930s. She worked for the daily newspaper Últimas Noticias alongside Ana Luisa Llovera, considered the first female Venezuelan reporter, as well as María Teresa Castillo. She also wrote for Ahora and helped found Tribuna Popular, the Communist Party's press organ. She sometimes wrote under the pseudonym "Petrovna."

Luzardo also wrote poetry, first publishing the collection Flor de cactus in 1942. The book collects poems written between 1935 and 1942, which mix political elements with romantic and erotic ones. A collection of poems written during her incarceration from 1950 and 1952 was published in 1993 under the title Huellas frescas.

== Personal life and legacy ==
Her only daughter, with the fellow revolutionary Luis Eduardo Pérez Arteaga, was born in 1939.

In 2016, Luzardo was given the Order of the Liberators Medal First Class by President Nicolás Maduro. She died later that year in Caracas, at age 100.
