= Soto Awards =

The Soto Awards (Spanish: Premios Soto) or ACACV Awards are film awards presented by the Academy of Cinematographic Sciences and Arts of Venezuela (ACACV), recognising excellence in the national film industry.

== History ==
After the creation of the Academy of Cinematographic Sciences and Arts of Venezuela (ACACV) on 21 October 2016, the organization became operative in January 2017. The first awards ceremony presented by the ACACV took place in June 2018 at the Teatro de Chacao.

No ceremony took place in 2023 and, in 2024, the academy announced the holding of the 5th edition in March 2024 with the new name of Premios Soto, after the kinetic artist Jesús Soto.

== Ceremonies ==
Ceremony date	Number	Best Film	Ref.
2018	1st	El Amparo	
2019	2nd	The Family	
2020	3rd	The Night of the Two Moons	
2022	4th	Opposite Direction	
2024	5th	Jezabel (2022)	
2024	5th	Simón (2023)	
2025	6th	Los herederos	
