= Gran Cine =

Gran Cine is a non-profit civil association founded on 13 June 1996. It functions as an alternative film distributor in Venezuela. The aims of the organisation are a rough group of objectives with the overall goal being to widen the reach of film, especially independent, diverse and global film, in Venezuela. It has a group of associated cinemas, used for exhibition and education.

The president of Gran Cine is Fernando Rotundo.

== Mobile cinema ==
Included in the aims of the organisation is the effort to create mobile cinemas, so that people from areas without cinemas can also see films.

Gran Cine co-sponsors the Argentinian Film Festival in Venezuela with the nation's Argentinian Embassy, with the festival having half of its films be available across the country at outdoor and mobile cinemas to improve access.

In 2015, Gran Cine Móvil held a series of film screenings and discussion forums to facilitate reflection and education on human rights around the world and in Venezuela, featuring the films Mine Alone and Invictus.

=== Problems ===
The outdoor cinema does face problems. One of the main ones is a lack of money to provide as many films as previously shown, but the public are also concerned to show up, due to the scarcity of power and street violence making a dark outside location unwelcoming. The number of locations has therefore been reduced, limited to a few sites around the capital rather than hundreds across the country as it was before.

Gran Cine also previously worked with cinemas, but most of them have had to close down.

== Film festivals ==
The organisation holds many free film festivals, celebrating diverse films from a variety of countries, including the biggest box office successes as well as some from independent and culturally diverse filmmakers. The aim, as with many of the organisation's endeavours, is to promote culturally and artistically significant film. The longest-running of these festivals is the Spanish Film Festival, which reached its 22nd year in 2018.

The 22nd Spanish Film Festival — also known as the OFF Festival — had, as well as the variety of films, a retrospective on the life and works of Pedro Almodóvar called "Al Modo Almodóvar". It was also supported by the Spanish Embassy in Caracas, Queiroz Publicidad and primarily hosted at Trasnocho Cultural.

With support from Kairos and the Argentina Embassy in Caracas, Gran Cine has held the Argentinian Film Festival annually from 2017. The two most highly promoted films from the 2018 festival, which ran for two weeks in November and December, were Zama and the Argentine-Venezuelan Arpón.

== Film factory ==
The film factory was set up in 2015, to develop the skills and independence of young peoples' abilities, with the program rolled out to more than 10 high schools by 2018. Rotundo has said that though culture could come second to politics and welfare, exposure to culture is crucial in young people developing critical awareness.
