= Royalton Hicacos =

Building in Cuba

Royalton Hicacos Resort & Spa
- Interactive map of the Royalton Hicacos Resort & Spa area
- Hotel chain: Royalton

General information
- Coordinates: 23.19461°N 81.16553°W
- Completed: 2003
- Opened: 2002
- Affiliation: Sunwing

Other information
- Number of rooms: 404
- Number of restaurants: 5
- Number of bars: 4

Website
- www.royalhicacosresort.com

Royalton Hicacos is a resort in Varadero, in the province of Matanzas, Cuba. Formerly operated by Sandals Resorts as Sandals Royal Hicacos, it was bought by Canadian company Sunwing and started operating under the Royalton brand in December 2014. Facilities include pools, diving; and, a spa, tennis and squash courts, sailing, windsurfing, and diving; and a basketball court.
