= Félix Nakamura =

Peruvian animator (1940–2000)

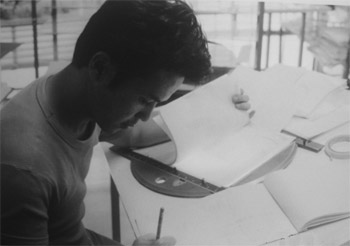
Félix Nakamura

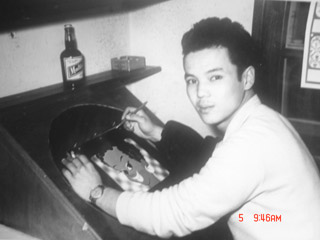
Nakamura at the drawing board

Félix Nakamura (June 30, 1940 Lima, Peru - April 3, 2000, Lima, Peru), was a Peruvian animator.

He was born in Peru to Japanese parents, he lived much of his life in Venezuela with his wife Isolina Nakamura and her daughter Rosa Nakamura. He died in his native Peru from cancer, in April 2000.

== History ==
Felix Nakamura is known in Venezuela and several other Latin-American countries as one of the prominent exponents of traditional animation in the region. He started his career in Argentina as an animator and soon became an important figure in the history of animation in Peru. He moved to Venezuela in the 1970's, brought by the founder of Bolivar Films

He was a key figure in the establishment of the Cartoon Center (Centro de Dibujos Animados) created by Fundación para el Desarrollo del Arte Audiovisual, Artevisión-USB, at Universidad Simón Bolívar in Caracas, Venezuela. There, he served for several years as the center's director, mentoring many young animators who began their careers in this unique center. During those years, he and his team produced the first soap opera "telenovela" that used animated characters alongside real people in RCTV, "Dulce Ilusión", which was a huge success in Latin-American television.

In the 1990s, he developed the curriculum for the animation program at Universidad de los Andes in Venezuela. He taught numerous animation courses for beginners in Venezuela and other countries in the Caribbean and Central America. In his later years, Nakamura became the central figure in the Venezuelan animation scene.

== Influences ==
In several interviews, Nakamura always refers to Max Fleischer and Walt Disney as his most important influences. His favorite movie was Pinocchio, and his preferred character was Betty Boop. Some of these influences are evident in his work.

== Work ==
Nakamura appears in almost all the credits of animated films produced in Venezuela between 1985 and 2000. His most memorable work includes the animated material used in the Children's Museum of Caracas, Venezuela, and the TV commercial for "Pocetas MAS," which has remained on air for over 25 years. "Canción del Elegido" sang by Soledad Bravo is perhaps the most remembered work by his audience, representing the pinnacle achievement of Artevisión-USB Cartoon Center. Other projects, like "Chiribitil" and "Tatacosmico," were never finished due to their high production cost. Under his direction, the award-winning 3-D animation "El mito de Peribo" was completed and broadcast in Venezuela, Latin America, and the Caribbean as one of the clips of the TV programs "Reseña" and "Reseña Latinoamericana y del Caribe" produced by Artevisión-USB. His last major project was "Rosaura en Bicicleta," which was left unfinished because of his health condition.

Some of those who were professionally trained by him include Jesús Quesada, Rosa Nakamura, Manuel Loayza, Máximo Cuya, Benicio Vincent Kou, Pedro Vivas, Miguel Lemman, and John Timms, and Jorge Zambrano.

In August 2008, the "First Felix Nakamura Animation Festival" was organized in Caracas, Venezuela, to promote and showcase the animation works and experiences of Venezuelan artists living around the world.
