= Valle Cocodrilo =

- English: Crocodile Valley
- Directed by: Leticia Patrizi
- Written by: Leticia Patrizi
- Produced by: School of Audiovisual Media, Universidad de Los Andes
- Cinematography: Eva Pérez
- Music by: Felix Siso
- Release date: 10 August 2013 (Venezuela)
- Country: Venezuela

Valle Cocodrilo (English: Crocodile Valley), also known as De cómo se escapó una idea en Valle Cocodrilo y lo que ahí aconteció (English: How an Idea Escaped in Crocodile Valley and What Happened There), is a 2013 Venezuelan shadow puppet short film written and directed by Leticia Patrizi.

== Synopsis ==
In Crocodile Valley, a scientist struggles with overwhelming anger and sadness. He has a brilliant idea; the film depicts a journey of life and happiness.

== Cast ==
The puppet operators are:

- Celeste Guadarrama – "Scientist"
- Dayana Matos – "Life"
- Amanda Pérez – "Idea"
- Edelweis Calderón – "Demons"

== Release ==
The film was released in Venezuela in 2013 by Centro Nacional Autónomo de Cinematografía. It was screened at the Iberoamerican Short Film Festival in 2014. It was distributed by Venezuela en Corto. Its soundtrack is available on SoundCloud.

== Accolades ==
The film has won several awards, including the Best Animated Short at the 2014 Barquisimeto National Short Film Festival and 2015 Venezuelan Festival of Spiritual Film. It received awards for Best Script and Best Sound in the university category of the 2015 Clemente De La Cerda National Short Film Festival, as well as for Best Original Music and Best Post Production at the 2015 "Voy Corto" Universities Audiovisual Festival.

It was part of the official selection at nine festivals; chronologically: 2014 Manuel Trujillo National Short Film Festival, 2014 Foreign Film Festival (Argentina), 2014 Eastern Feature and Short Film Festival, 2014 Margarita Latin American and Caribbean Film Festival, "Iberoamerican Shorts" of 2014 Short Shorts Toluca Festival (Mexico), 2014 Puerto Madryn International Film Festival (Argentina), 2015 "Voy Corto" Universities Audiovisual Festival, 2015 Clemente De La Cerda National Short Film Festival, and the 2015 Venezuelan Festival of Spiritual Film.
