= Gladys Parentelli =

Uruguayan feminist theologian and photographer

- Born: Gladys Ethel Parentelli Manzino; March 21, 1935 (age 91); Carmelo, Uruguay
- Occupations: Photographer and feminist theologian

Gladys Ethel Parentelli Manzino (born 21 March 1935 in Carmelo, Colonia, Uruguay) is a Uruguayan feminist theologian and photographer who has lived in Venezuela since 1969. A representative of Latin American ecofeminism, she was one of three Latin American women appointed by Pope Paul VI as observers at the Second Vatican Council.

== Early life ==
Gladys Parentelli was born in her grandmother's house in Carmelo. In 1969 she went to Venezuela on a religious mission with the Movimiento Internacional de Juventudes Agrarias Católicas (MIJARC).

== Career ==
Parentelli studied education, information science, group dynamics, feminist theology, and photography. She does portrait photography, and her studies have led her to ecofeminism. She is the founder and president of the Movimiento de la Juventud Agraria Católica Femenina. She is a member of several associations of women theologians and pastors in Latin America. She is the founder of the Red Latinoamericana de Teología y Espiritualidad Ecofeminista in Venezuela. She is the director of the Foro Permanente por la Equidad de Género and CISFEM. She is the Venezuelan head of Católicas por el Derecho a Decidir, an organization that teaches family planning to poor women. She teaches in this field and has written several essays and articles in specialized journals and in news media.

She is the National Coordinator of Documentation and Publications at the Red Universitaria Venezolana de Estudios de las Mujeres (REUVEM-Venezuela).

=== Ecofeminism ===
Gladys Parentelli is a representative of Latin American ecofeminism. The central idea of ecofeminism is that the oppression of women and the destruction of the planet result from the same patriarchal system.

In Latin America ecofeminism has been connected with feminist philosophy and liberation theology.

=== Vatican II ===
Gladys Parentelli, as a representative of Latin American ecofeminism, was one of three Latin American women appointed by Pope Paul VI as observers at the Second Vatican Council.

At the time, as president of the women's branch of the Movimiento Internacional de la Juventud Agrícola y Rural Católica (MIJARC), she thought:

We hoped that out of the Council would come a democratic, open, horizontal, communitarian Church, which would follow Christ's teachings. (Teníamos la esperanza que del Concilio saliera una iglesia democrática, abierta, horizontal, comunitaria, que siguiera las enseñanzas de Cristo.)

As an auditor at the Second Vatican Council, she supported liberation theology, which appeared at the same time as the Council.

== Works ==
Articles written by Parentelli include:

- Mujer, Iglesia, Liberación, 1990, ISBN 9789800702130.
- Una relectura del Dios Patriarcal desde una perspectiva feminista cristiana, Con la mirada de la Teología Feminista y del Ecofeminismo, Diario de los Andes, 2010.
- Teología ecofeminista, Venezuela, Universidad del Zulia, 1997, oclc 819773607
- Reseña de "El divino Bolívar. Ensayo sobre una religión republicana" de Elías Pino Iturrieta, Universidad Nacional Experimental Rafael María Baralt – UNERMB 2006, OCLC 181395505
- ¿Quién le compró la Tierra a Dios? Ética y cultura para una civilización sostenible, Universitat de Barcelona 1999, OCLC 723213828.
- Teólogas feministas, Teólogos de la Liberación y hasta las simples mujeres marginales exigen una Iglesia verdaderamente cristiana., Universitat de Barcelona 1992, OCLC 723215468.
- Las mujeres cristianas acabarán con el autoritarismo papal, Universitat de Barcelona, 1996, OCLC 723217367.
- El que tenga pecado lance la primera piedra. Reflexiones acerca de la Encíclica Evangelium Vitae, Universitat de Barcelona, 1996, OCLC 723215282.
- Teología Feminista y Teología Ecofeminista, Fempress 1995.
- Teología ecofeminista – ecofeminismo holístico en el caso latinoamericano, Lolapress, 1997.
- Luisa Muraro: ‘Lo sé porque soy’ (Lo so perché lo sono), publicado en Via Dogana, N° 94, Set. 2010, p. 4.Traducción publicada en: Mujer Pública, La Paz, Bolivia, Feb. 2011, N° 4, p. 115.
- Ecofeminismo holístico en el caso latinoamericano, en el libro Las raíces de la memoria: América Latina, ayer y hoy.
- Del Dios patriarcal a la sabiduría que sostiene, WebIslam.
- Palabra de mujer: Algunas vivencias y reflexiones.
- Testimonios que las pioneras nos legaron, revista Mujer Pública Nº 5.

== See also ==
- Marcella Althaus-Reid
