= Cinex =

Movie theater chain in Venezuela

- Formation: 1998
- Headquarters: Caracas, Venezuela
- Products: 2D, 3D, 4DX, Privé, VIP, CinexCheff and CinexArt.
- Owner: Evenpro and Propacine
- Website: www.cinex.com.ve

Cinex (Circuito Nacional de Exhibidores, S.A.) is Venezuela's largest cinema chain, with 24 locations in 13 Venezuelan cities. It was founded in 1998 through the merger of three companies: Circuito Radonski, Venefilms and Grupo Blanco. At the end of 2011, thanks to the sale of the Radonski Circuit, a new partner of the brand was incorporated: Evenpro, which would later also buy the theaters belonging to Cinematográfica Blancica (Grupo Blanco).

== History ==
By the mid-1970s, Antonio Blanco's Blanco & Travieso was one of Venezuela's two largest film distributors, together with Cines Unidos. Blanco also owned Blancica and by 1977 the two companies distributed the films of Cinema International Corporation, Disney, ITC Entertainment, and De Laurentiis. The companies also owned distributor Venefilm. In the summer of 1976, the group also acquired 50% of the Radonski exhibition circuit. In addition to the distribution companies, by 1977, Blanco, with partners Alberto Plaza and Luis Poleo, controlled 35 cinemas in Venezuela, or about half of the cinemas in Caracas.
