= Diana López Moyal =

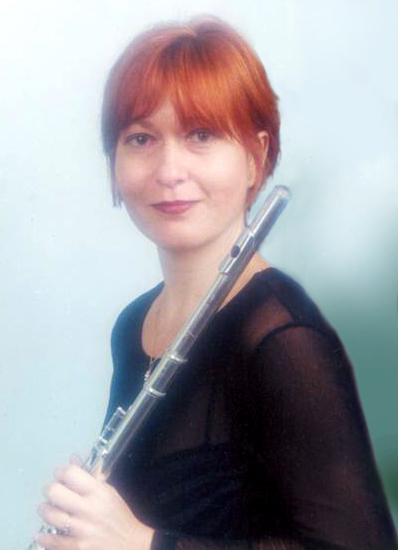
- Diana López Moyal, 1998

Background information
- Born: 25 November 1962 (age 62); Havana, Cuba
- Genres: Classical music, symphonic music, instrumental
- Occupation(s): Flute player, music teacher
- Instrument: Flute
- Years active: 1986–present
- Website: dianalopezmoyal.wix.com/diana-lopez-moyal

Diana López Moyal is a Cuban flutist, musician, performer, and teacher based in Miami. Born in Havana, Cuba, she graduated with a Bachelor of Music in Flute from the Higher Institute of Art in 1986 and was appointed as a professor at the Amadeo Roldan Conservatory.

From 1980 to 1984, Moyal was a member of the Cuban rock band "Géminis." Following that, she served as a member of the National Concert Band from 1986 to 1992. In 1991, Moyal joined forces with guitarist Luis Manuel Molina to form the "Duo Cáliz." The duo gained recognition and in 1994 they were invited to perform at the "International Guitar Festival Ponferrada 94" and at the Ateneo de Madrid by the Spanish Society of the Guitar.

In addition to her work with Duo Cáliz, Moyal founded the "Duo Transparency" with pianist Silvia Alonso in 1994. They traveled to Mexico in 1998 and were invited by the Casa del Lago and the cultural diffusion of the UNAM. Moyal also collaborated with the soprano Iris Zemva to form the "Istria Ensemble." The ensemble performed concerts across the country and released a disc titled L'Opera, le piu belle Arie di Mozart a Puccini.

In April 1999, Moyal was invited to the Seventh International Festival of the Flute at the University Hall Carlos Chávez, where she premiered works by Mexican composers. Since 2000, she has been performing concerts in various venues throughout the country, along with engaging in educational activities such as teaching at the Canadian Institute of Mexico and leading workshops on choral singing at the Colegio de México.

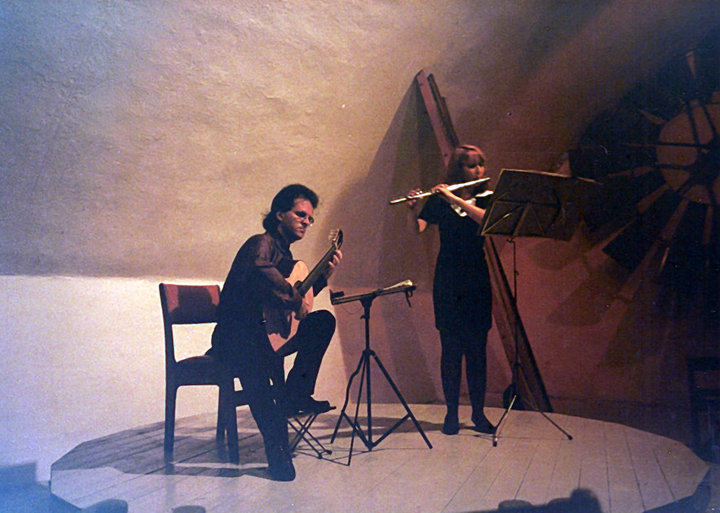
Duo Cáliz with Luis Manuel Molina, Havana.

From 2005 to 2010, Moyal served as a professor of flute at the Universidad de las Américas (UDLA) in Puebla, Mexico. In 2006, she became a professor of music at the Mexican Institute of Hearing and Language (IMAL), focusing on musical education for children with hearing impairments. Starting in 2010, Moyal began teaching piano and flute to postulancy students at the Universidad La Salle. In the summer of 2013, she began teaching piano lessons at ERM Performing Arts, a center for integrated training in performing arts disciplines such as singing, dance, music, and acting.

In September, Moyal became a music teacher and tutor at "Mis Amigos Languages" in Coral Gables, Miami. On April 23, 2015, she embarked on a new project called L&L Duet, partnering with pianist Teresita De León and offering recitals at the English Center in Miami.

Since August 2016, Moyal has held the position of music teacher at the English Center, where she currently works.

== Discography ==
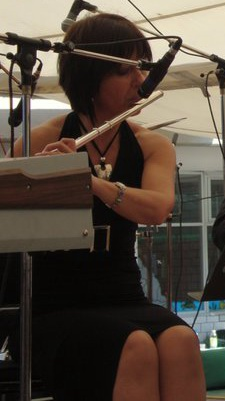
Diana performing.

Ernesto Lecuona Ensemble:

- Álbum de Cuba

Istria Ensemble:

- L’Opera, le piu belle arie di Mozart a Puccini

Duo Transparencia:

- Transparencia
