= Guayaquil International Film Festival =

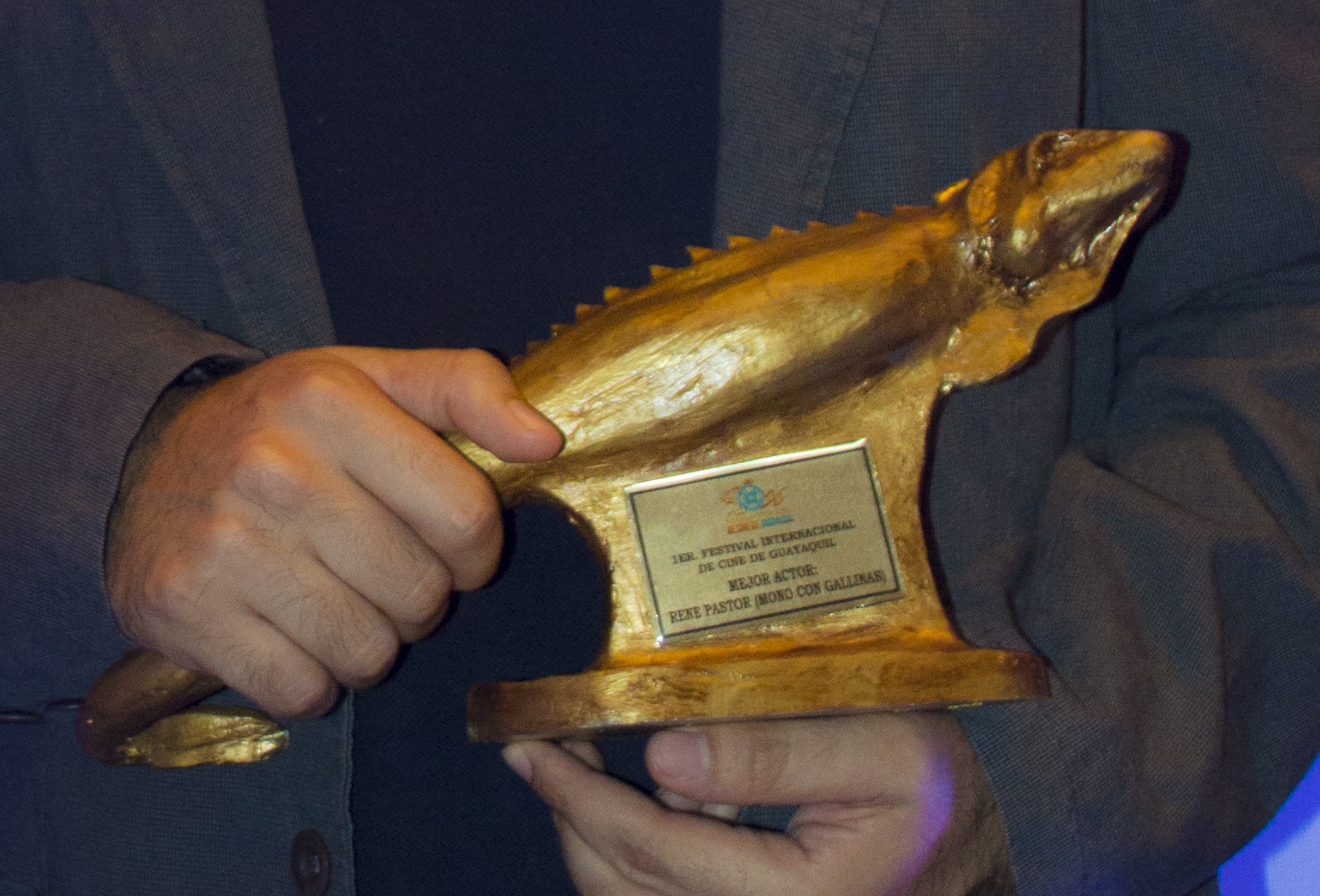
Iguana Dorada 2015

The Festival Internacional de Cine de Guayaquil is an annual international film festival in Guayaquil, Ecuador. It was founded in 2015. In 2017, 119 films were shown and, according to the organizers, the festival drew an attendance of more than 10,000 in Guayaquil, Machala, and Portoviejo.

Several prizes "Iguana Dorada" are awarded to the best long and short films in the categories fiction or documentary and national or international, and films from an invited country are featured.
