= Diana López (artist) =

Venezuelan visual artist

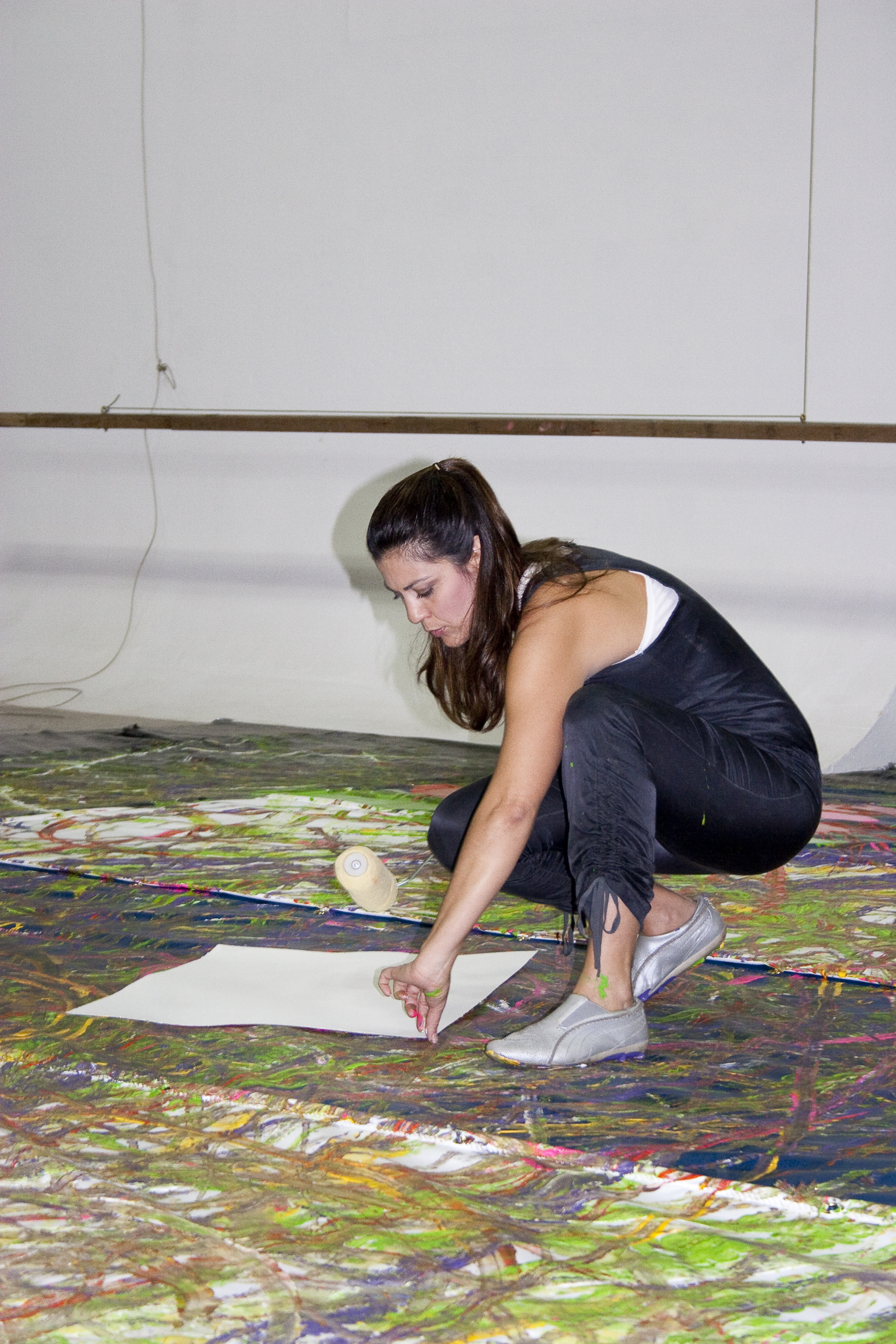
- Diana López in the performance of Pintura de acción en dos tiempos (2009)
- Born: August 24, 1968 (age 58); Philadelphia, United States
- Education: San Francisco Art Institute
- Occupations: visual artist and cultural manager
- Employer: Foundation Cultura Chacao (2003-2013)

Diana López (born August 24, 1968) is a Venezuelan visual artist and cultural manager. She developed her artistic style in the nineties, focusing on participation and exchange with other people in the production of her pieces. In 1994, she became the first woman to receive the Eugenio Mendoza Prize. Her work ranges from photography and video to performance and installations. López was director of culture for the Chacao municipality for seven years. While there, she promoted the creation of the Chacao Theater and the library of Los Palos Grandes in Caracas. She is the director of the Urban Photography Archive in Caracas.

== Biography ==
In 1987, López began her artistic studies at the Federico Brandt Art Institute in Caracas. She obtained a BFA (1992) and an MFA (1994) Graduate Fellowship at the San Francisco Art Institute, where she studied with Tony Labat, Doug Hall and the writer Kathy Acker.

By 1995, López had obtained a scholarship from the CALARA Foundation to participate in the PS1 International Study Program, affiliated with the Museum of Modern Art in New York and there developed the photographic project El ojo de ...

Aware of the local circumstances, López addresses social issues and turns an everyday object into an art object, such is the case of Muchacha, winner of the VII Edition of the Eugenio Mendoza Prize in 1994. In 1996, she presented the solo exhibition Esto no es un martillo at Sala Mendoza in Caracas, with the photographic project El ojo de…

In 1997, she co-founded with the architect Carolina Tinoco "Espacio Local", an artist – run space in Caracas where emerging artists were shown. During the same year, she was invited to participate in La invención de la continuidad curated by Ariel Jiménez and Luis Pérez Oramas at The Venezuelan National Art Gallery (GAN). During this decade her work was included in various exhibitions in Venezuela, the United States and Canada. In 2005, her tapestry “Desaparecida” is presented at the group exhibition Jump Cuts, Banco Mercantil's Collection at the Americas Society in New York. This exhibition was the largest exhibition of Venezuelan contemporary art in America in decades.

In 2007, she participates in ID performance with the work A que le tienes miedo? (What are you afraid of?) In collaboration with the dance group Tránsito en Caracas. Later, with the same group, she presented Pintura de acción en dos tiempos (Two–stroke action paint) in Periférico Caracas, Los Galpones. In this performance López included bikers with their respective vehicles and three dancers with reduced mobility in wheelchairs, and had a juxtaposition of records: video; painting and drawing.

Between 2006 and 2013, she was the chair of the public foundation Cultura Chacao in Caracas. While there, López promoted a wide range of cultural programming strengthening the local identity. Some of the most popular events were the Festival Por el medio de la calle, the Festival de la Lectura and Paseo Los Palos Grandes. Her main contribution was to lead the construction of public cultural infrastructure for the municipality, the Library of Los Palos Grandes in Caracas (2009) and the Chacao Theater (2011).

In 2014, she published the book Claves Urbanas, where López summarizes her time at Cultura Chacao and details the urban reality of Caracas, the challenges that the city offers for its environment, from the point of view of culture, memory and sustainability.

== Exhibitions ==
Diana López's work has been exhibited individually and collectively in prestigious institutions in Latin America, the United States, Canada and Australia such as the MoMa PS1, Anthology Film Archives in New York, the Diego Rivera Gallery, New Langton Arts of San Francisco, Track 16 Gallery of Los Angeles, Art Metropole, the Alejandro Otero Museum, the Venezuelan National Art Gallery, Sala Mendoza in Caracas, the Jesús Soto Museum in Ciudad Bolivar, the MACZUL of Maracaibo, the Lima Art Museum, the MAC of Panama, and the Centre for Contemporary Photography in Melbourne.

Her work is documented in catalogs, dictionaries, videos, PhDs thesis, and academic volumes.

== Publications ==
- Claves Urbanas, 2014
- Arte tras las Rejas (Art behind bars), with Carlos Javier Arencibia, 2018

== Curatorship ==
- XII Edition Eugenio Mendoza Award, 2013

== Awards ==
- Eugenio Mendoza Prize, 1994
- Aica Prize, 2014
