= The Family (2017 film) =

2017 film

- Film poster
- Spanish: La familia
- Directed by: Gustavo Rondón Córdova
- Written by: Gustavo Rondón Córdova
- Starring: Giovanni Garcia; Reggie Reyes
- Release date: 23 May 2017 (Cannes)
- Running time: 82 minutes
- Countries: Venezuela; Chile; Norway
- Language: Spanish

The Family (Spanish: La familia) is a 2017 drama film directed by Gustavo Rondón Córdova. It was screened in the Critics' Week section at the 2017 Cannes Film Festival. It was selected as the Venezuelan entry for the Best Foreign Language Film at the 91st Academy Awards, but it was not nominated. It is a co-production between Venezuela, Chile and Norway.

== Plot ==
Near Caracas, a father and his teenage son go on the run after a violent altercation puts their lives at risk.

== Cast ==
- Giovanni García
- Reggie Reyes

== Reception ==
As of June 2020, the film holds a 91% approval rating on review aggregator Rotten Tomatoes, based on eleven reviews with an average rating of 7.75/10.

== See also ==
- List of submissions to the 91st Academy Awards for Best Foreign Language Film
- List of Venezuelan submissions for the Academy Award for Best Foreign Language Film
