= Eumelia Hernández =

Venezuelan feminist activist, and unionist

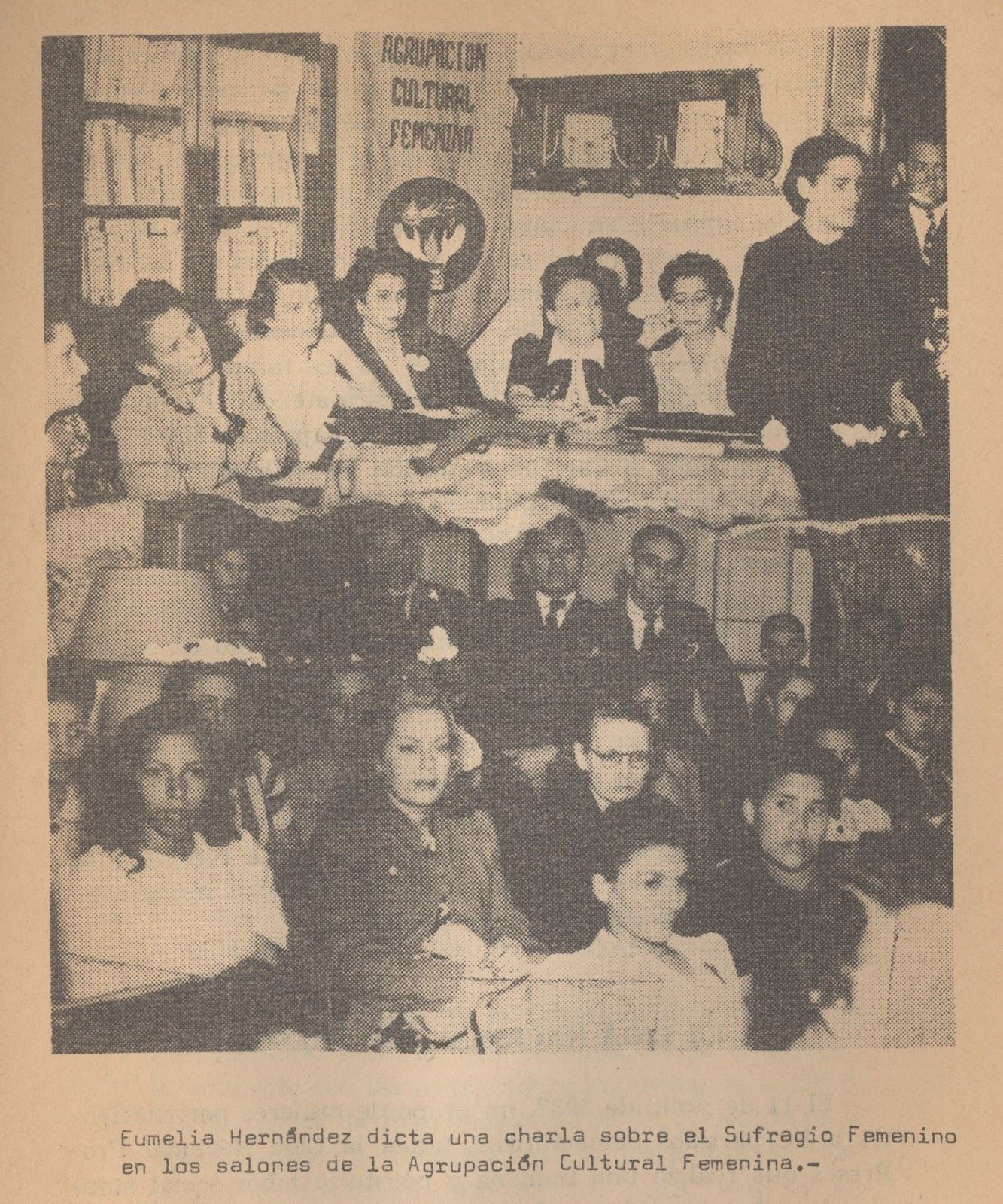
Eumelia Hernandez gives a talk on Women's Suffrage in the halls of the Women's Cultural Association

Eumelia Hernández (14 October 1913 – 19 September 1990) was a Venezuelan feminist activist, and unionist. She was a founding member of the Feminine Cultural Association and the Vice President of the Central Unitary of Workers of Venezuela.

== Life ==
Eumelia Hernández was born on 14 October 1913 in Caracas. Hernández joined the Venezuelan women's movement. She was a Vice President of the Central Unitary of Workers of Venezuela. In 1936 after the death of the dictator Juan Vicente Gómez Hernández joined various movements of women and workers. That year she joined Feminine Cultural Association with the aim to reform the Civil Code achieving the right of women to choose and be elected under equal conditions, as well as eliminate discrimination of children born out of marriage.

Hernández was also a member of the Communist Party of Venezuela. In 1940 Hernández made a presentation "Working woman" at the first Women's Conference advocating for equal pay for female workers, protection for pregnant women and running a campaign of literacy. During the government of Eleazar López Contreras Hernández was imprisoned for the first time, and later she was imprisoned again in the Los Teques prison during the Marcos Pérez Jiménez dictatorship. In 1958 after return to democracy Hernández became active again.

When the Regional Central of Workers of the Federal District and Miranda State was founded in 1963, Hernández became a member of Women's Department and was in charge of the Women's Department of the Central Venezuelan Workers Unit. She participated in numerous union meetings in Venezuela and abroad.

Eumelia Hernández died on 17 September 1990 in Caracas.

== Acknowledgements ==
In 2013, on the request of the National Commission of Gender Justice of the Judicial Power before the Supreme Court of Justice of Venezuela the Order of Merit named "Eumelia Hernández" was implemented and instituted. The Order is considered as a recognition of the life and activity of the Eumelia Hernández.

== See also ==
- Political prisoners in Venezuela
