= Cines Unidos =

Venezuelan cinema chain

Compañía Anónima Empresa Cines Unidos
- Logo used since 2026

- Entrance to Cines Unidos in Sambil Valencia.
- Trade name: Cines Unidos
- Industry: Entertainment
- Founded: 1947; 79 years ago
- Headquarters: Caracas, Venezuela
- Website: www.cinesunidos.com

Cines Unidos is a Venezuelan cinema chain founded on June 13, 1947. It is located in 10 cities and has 169 screens in 20 complexes, making it the chain with the largest number of screens in the country and the second largest in terms of number of cinemas, after Cinex. The company also operates as a national film distributor.

== History ==
Ilio Ulivi Parra opened the first movie theater in the parish of La Pastora in 1940. By 1947, he had opened 15 theaters throughout Caracas.

The redevelopment of the Caracas in the second half of the 20th century led Ulivi Parra to expand the chain into other neighborhoods. This led to the opening of the Los Chaguaramos drive-in theater, the first of its kind in Venezuela and Latin America. By the 1970s, the Cines Unidos chain was already widely known throughout Caracas. This expansion led to the creation of multiplexes.

By 1977, the company was run by Gonzalo and Silvio Ulivi and, together with Blanco & Travieso, were the two biggest film distributors in Venezuela, dominating the market and distributing all product from the Hollywood major studios, except for United Artists. At the time, Cines Unidos was distibuting all films produced by 20th Century Fox, Columbia Pictures, Warner Bros., American International Pictures and Avco-Embassy in Venezuela. By 1977, the company also controlled 45 cinemas in Venezuela.

Cines Unidos built the La Granja complex in Valencia in 1995, the largest cinema in Venezuela at the time, a modern multiplex with six screens that would later be surpassed the following year by Las Trinitarias in Barquisimeto, with eight screens.

In 2011, Cines Unidos launched the first smartphone app in Latin America for movie theaters and by 2015, it became the only cinema operator in the country with 100% digital projection. At the end of 2023, Cines Unidos opened the first theater in Venezuela with Dolby Atmos 360 Sound and Laser Projection in the Líder Shopping Center in Caracas.
