= List of Costa Rican films =

This is a list of films produced in Costa Rica.

- 130 Children (2022)
- About Us (2016)
- The Altar Boy, the Priest and the Gardener (2025)
- La apuesta (1968)
- Asesinato en el Meneo (2001)
- The Awakening of the Ants (2019)
- Bonne année (2006)
- A Boyfriend's Presentation (2019)
- Brinca brinca la cuerdita (1995)
- La Calera (1998)
- El Camino (2007)
- Caribe (2004)
- C'est comme ça (2005)
- El Cielo Rojo (2008)
- Clara Sola (2021)
- Costa Rica, S.A. (2006) (TV)
- Delirio (2024)
- Doble llave y cadena (2005)
- Domingo and the Mist (2022)
- En el nombre del pueblo (2000)
- Enredados, la confusión (2018)
- Et Hjørne af paradis (1997)
- Eulalia (1987)
- First Lady of the Revolution (2016)
- Gestación (2009)
- It's a Jungle Out There... An Independent Film in Costa Rica (2004) (TV)
- Land of Ashes (2019)
- El Loco, Cacharro y su capitán (2002)
- Maikol Yordan de Viaje Perdido (2014)
- Marasmo (2003)
- Medea (2017)
- Memories of a Burning Body (2024)
- Milagro de amor (1955)
- Mon amour (2006)
- Morirás con el sol (Motociclistas suicidas) (1973)
- Mujeres apasionadas (2003)
- La Negrita, el Milagro de Nuestra Señora de los Ángeles (1985)
- NICA/raguense (2005)
- Nicaragua: Free Homeland or Death? (1978)
- Nuestro pan de cada día (2001)
- Odyssey 2050 (2012)
- Of Love and Other Demons (2009)
- Paso a paso: A sentimental journey (2006)
- Password: Una mirada en la oscuridad (2002)
- El Pecas (2004)
- La Pension (1999)
- Presos (2015)
- Red Princesses (2013)
- El Retorno (1930)
- Saber quién echó fuego ahí (2005)
- El Sanatorio (2010)
- La Segua (1984)
- Síncope (2003)
- The Sound of Things (2016)
- Tropix (2002)
- The Uprising (1980)
- Viaje (2015)
- Violeta al fin (2017)
- We Are Angels (1996)

== See also ==
- List of Costa Rican submissions for the Academy Award for Best Foreign Language Film
