= Cinema of Costa Rica =

- No. of screens: 150 (2016)
  - Per capita: 3.0 per 100,000 (2016)

Produced feature films (2011-2017)
- Total: 50

The cinema of Costa Rica comprises the art of film and creative movies made within the nation of Costa Rica or by Costa Rican filmmakers abroad.

Though nearly all Costa Rican cinemas exclusively show Hollywood productions, the number of films produced in Costa Rica has increased in recent years. The films range from horror and comedy films focused on entertainment value to art cinema. The country's art films are often character studies, focusing on aesthetics and narrative and less on political issues. Costa Rican auteur directors successful in the international art film circuit include Paz Fábrega and Ishtar Yasin Gutiérrez.

== History ==
The first full-length film produced and directed by Costa Ricans is El Retorno in 1930.

Historically, opportunities to create films in Costa Rica was limited. The prohibitive cost of equipment and materials for celluloid film-making combined with the lack of both private and governmental support meant that a national or regional film industry was difficult to realize. The Centro de Cine was founded in 1973, but remained stagnant for decades. Only one fictional feature film was made in the 1990s in all of Central America - Guatemalan director Luis Argueta’s El Silencio de Neto (Neto's Silence, 1994).

However, increased funding and institutional support, the lower cost of digital film-making, and alternative distribution channels have led to increased film production since 2000. The Central American film fund Cinergia was launched in 2004 with support from foreign nonprofits and film industries. It supported 80 productions in Central America including Agua Fría de Mar (Cold Water of the Sea, 2010) by Paz Fábrega, which earned the Tiger Award at the Rotterdam Festival. In 2015, a national production fund called El Fauno was launched and supported 40 indigenous film, TV, and Internet projects as of April 2019. Regional organizations like Ibermedia and DocTVLatinoamérica have helped fund projects in Costa Rica. Young graduates from film schools in Europe, the United States, and especially Cuba's International School of Filmmaking and Television have returned to the country to make films. Several local colleges such as Universidad Veritas and the University of Costa Rica are now offering film training. Though more films are being produced, broad distribution is still an issue for Costa Rican films. Even well-received films often aren't available on DVD via streaming.

Regional film festivals have succeeded in recognizing and promoting regional films and promoting regional connections. The first regular showcase for local films in Central America was Costa Rica's Filmmaking and Video Showcase, which lasted from 1992 to 2012. In 2012, it became the International Film Festival San José Peace on Earth, and included both national and international films for the first time. In 2015, it expanded into the Costa Rican International Film Festival, and grew to show 73 films in 2017. The festival shows films in competition for prizes in national, regional, and international categories and provides help for projects underway. The Icaro Central American Film Festival has promoted Central American film regionally and internationally. Since 2004, the festival's touring showcase, known as Muestra Ícaro, has been exhibited in every Central American country and, recently, to Cuba, Puerto Rico, and the US.

Costa Rica's National Film Council started submitting entries for the Oscars since 2005. A new National Cinematheque building is being constructed in San Jose to support screenings and educational programs.

In 2001, a collaboration of productions companies and television network, Televisora de Costa Rica, created a film that was financially success in its theatrical release, Asesinato en El Meneo. As of January 2015, Maikol Yordan de viaje perdido (Maikol Yordan Travelling Lost, 2014), a neo-costumbrista comedy directed by Miguel Gómez and the comedy troupe La Media Docena, was the most successful film in the Costa Rican box office. It attracted 700,000 viewers and showed in local cinemas for six months.

== See also ==
- List of Costa Rican films
- Costa Rican film actors
- Costa Rican film directors
- List of Costa Rican submissions for the Academy Award for Best Foreign Language Film
