= Milagro =

Milagro means "miracle" in Spanish. It may refer to:

== Places ==
- Milagro, La Rioja, Argentina, a municipality and village
- Milagro, Ecuador, a city
- Milagro, Navarre, Spain, a town and municipality
- Milagro Canton, Ecuador, of which the city is the canton seat
- Milagro River, Ecuador
- El Milagro, Quintana Roo, Mexico, a community
- El Milagro District, Peru

== Arts and entertainment ==
- Milagro (Santana album), by Carlos Santana
- Milagro (Jaci Velasquez album)
- "Milagro" (The X-Files), an X-Files episode
- A fictional village in the 1988 film The Milagro Beanfield War from the 1974 John Nichols novel of the same name
- Milagro (theatre), a theatre company and Latino cultural center in Portland, Oregon

== People ==
- Milagro Sala (born 1964), Argentine activist
- Milagro Vargas (born 1955), American opera singer

== Other uses ==
- Milagro (experiment), a gamma ray detector at Los Alamos National Laboratory in New Mexico, US
- Milagro (votive), a small metal votive offerings, a Mexican folk tradition
- Operación Milagro, a joint health program between Cuba and Venezuela set up in 2005
- Milagro Tequila, a brand of 100% agave tequila

== See also ==
- Milagro de amor (disambiguation)
- Milagros (disambiguation)
