= Bucknam =

Bucknam is a surname. Notable people with the surname include:

- Frank W. Bucknam (1869–1942), American pharmacist
- Olivia Dudley Bucknam (1874–1966), American civic leader
- Ransford Dodsworth Bucknam (1869–1915), Canadian-born Turkish Army admiral
- Thelma Darkings Bucknam (b. 1960), Costa Rican actress and television presenter

== See also ==
- Bucknum
