= Preso =

Preso may refer to:

- Presos, a 2015 Costa Rican film
- "El Preso", a song by Fruko y sus Tesos, 1975
- "Preso", a song by Rosalía from her 2018 album El mal querer
