= Red princess =

The term Red Princess may refer to:

== People ==
- Archduchess Elisabeth Marie of Austria (1883–1963), Austrian socialist nicknamed "The Red Archduchess"
- Princess María Teresa of Bourbon-Parma (1933–2020), French-Spanish socialist nicknamed "The Red Princess"
- Katharine Stewart-Murray, Duchess of Atholl (1874–1960), British anti-fascist nicknamed "The Red Duchess"
- Princess Red Wing (Mary E. Glasko Congdon; 1896–1987), Native American historian

== Films ==
- Red Princesses, 2013 Costa Rican drama film
