= Apuesta =

Apuesta (English means Wager) may refer to:

- "Apuesta", song and EP by Cirse (band)
- "La Apuesta" (The Bet) song by Thalía
- La apuesta (film) (The Bet) 1968 Costa Rican film directed by Miguel Salaguero
