= Medea (2017 film) =

2017 film

- Film poster
- Directed by: Alexandra Latishev Salazar
- Written by: Alexandra Latishev Salazar
- Produced by: Paz Fábrega; Valentina Maurel; Iván Molina; Luis Smok
- Starring: Liliana Biamonte
- Cinematography: Oscar Medina; Alvaro Torres Crespo
- Edited by: Soledad Salfate
- Music by: Susan Campos
- Release date: 27 April 2017
- Running time: 70 minutes
- Country: Costa Rica
- Language: Spanish

Medea is a 2017 Costa Rican drama film directed by Alexandra Latishev Salazar. It was selected as the Costa Rican entry for the Best Foreign Language Film at the 91st Academy Awards, but it was not nominated.

== Cast ==
- Liliana Biamonte as María José
- Erick Calderon as Carlos
- Javier Montenegro as Javier

== See also ==
- List of submissions to the 91st Academy Awards for Best Foreign Language Film
- List of Costa Rican submissions for the Academy Award for Best Foreign Language Film
