= Milagros =

Milagros ("miracles" in Spanish) may refer to:

== Places ==
- Milagros, Masbate, Philippines, a first-class municipality
- Milagros, Province of Burgos, a municipality in Castile and León, Spain

== People ==
- Milagros (given name)
- Fernando Milagros (born 1980), Chilean pop rock singer and songwriter

== Arts and entertainment ==
- Milagros (film), a 1997 film
- Milagros (telenovela), a 2001 Peruvian telenovela
- Milagros: Girl from Away, a 2008 book by Meg Medina
- Milagros, a 2001 studio album by American singer Myra

== See also ==
- Acueducto de los Milagros, an ancient Roman aqueduct bridge in Spain
- Milagro (disambiguation)
