= Bucknum =

Bucknum is a surname. Notable people with the surname include:

- Evora Bucknum (1851–1929), American educator, cookbook writer, and missionary
- Jeff Bucknum (b. 1966), American racing driver
- Ronnie Bucknum (1936–1992) American racing driver

== See also ==
- Bucknam
