= Milagro de amor =

Milagro de amor ("Miracle of Love") may refer to:

- Milagro de amor (es), 1946 Argentine film directed by Francisco Múgica based on the poem Margerita la tornera by José Zorrilla y Moral
- Milagro de amor (1955 film), a filmed version of Alcides Prado's zarzuela, directed by impresario José Gamboa
- Milagro de amor, 1998 album by Opus Cuatro
- Milagros de amor, Colombian telenovela 2002
