= La 1/2 Docena =

Costa Rican comedy group

La 1/2 Docena (or La Media Docena) is a Costa Rican comedy group formed by Mario Chacon, Erik Hernández, Edgar Murillo, and Daniel Moreno, formed in 1994. They had a Television Series (El Show de la Media Docena) and a Radio Show (Platicomedia). In 2014 they produced their first movie (Maikol Yordan de Viaje Perdido) and in 2018 the second one (Maikol Yordan 2: La Cura Lejana). They also produced another one (Mi papá es un santa) set to premier in 2020, but because of COVID-19 pandemic it was pushed to November 2021.

== History of the group ==
=== Early years ===
Their members met each other in Saint Francis School, a private school in Costa Rica. There, Mario and Daniel joined with comedy acts in some school's festivals with Erik contributing with music for the act. Edgar was a year younger and was also seen as a comedian among his classmates.

In the university, each took different paths. However, for a family activity Mario ask Daniel, among others including early members Gabriel Salas and Luis Cañizales, to be part of a comedy sketch. One of the involved friends suggested to invite Edgar to join the activity. Eventually Daniel couldn't join but the rest recreated "El Rey Enamorado", an original sketch from the Argentinian group Les Luthiers. During this presentation, the group already had a logo (5 eggs cartoons crying over a broken egg, created by Gabriel) and a name "La 1/2 Docena menos uno" (translated Half a Dozen minus one).

This presentation took them to have a more formal presentation, including Daniel, in a local bar on October 29th, 1994. This was the last presentation where the name matched the logo, since Gabriel left the group shortly after.

Between 1994 and 1996 they kept having shows in local bars, doing comedy sketches and parody musical numbers. One of the most famous one is "Historia de un pirata" a parody of "Historias de Taxi" by Guatemalan musician Ricardo Arjona. By that time Luis Cañizales left the group and the name changed to just "La 1/2 Docena".

Between 1994 and 1996 they continued having shows in local bars, but they were less frequent. But "Historias de un pirata" became so popular that a local musical group recorded it without knowing its origin and it became a radio hit in the country. With this as a proof, the group knew their humor was well-received and motivated them to write new musical parodies and material.

=== Theater ===
In 1999, with support of actor Alexander Campos, the group did their first theater show called "La 1/2 Docena: ¡A Escena!" on March 11. The show was a hit with the last show presented in May 2000 in Melico Salazar Theater, completely sold out.

In 2001, they presented their second show "Un Dos X Tres". By this show, they decided to be full-time comedians and compromise with the group to pursue a carrier in comedy.

Their third show "¿Qué hay de nuevo?" was premiered in 2002. And in 2003 they created their fourth show called "Telepar'odiar". That same year they launched their first DVD "La media docena... ¡en vivo!" and a year later the second one with a performance of "Telepar'odiar".

By 2007, they premier their fifth theatrical show "La 1/2 docent: su historia", in which they go through their historical comedy sketches.

=== Television ===
In 2005, they premiered their tv show "El show de la 1/2 docena" with one of the biggest TV broadcaster in the country, Teletica.
