= Scott Steiner =

American retired professional wrestler (born 1962)

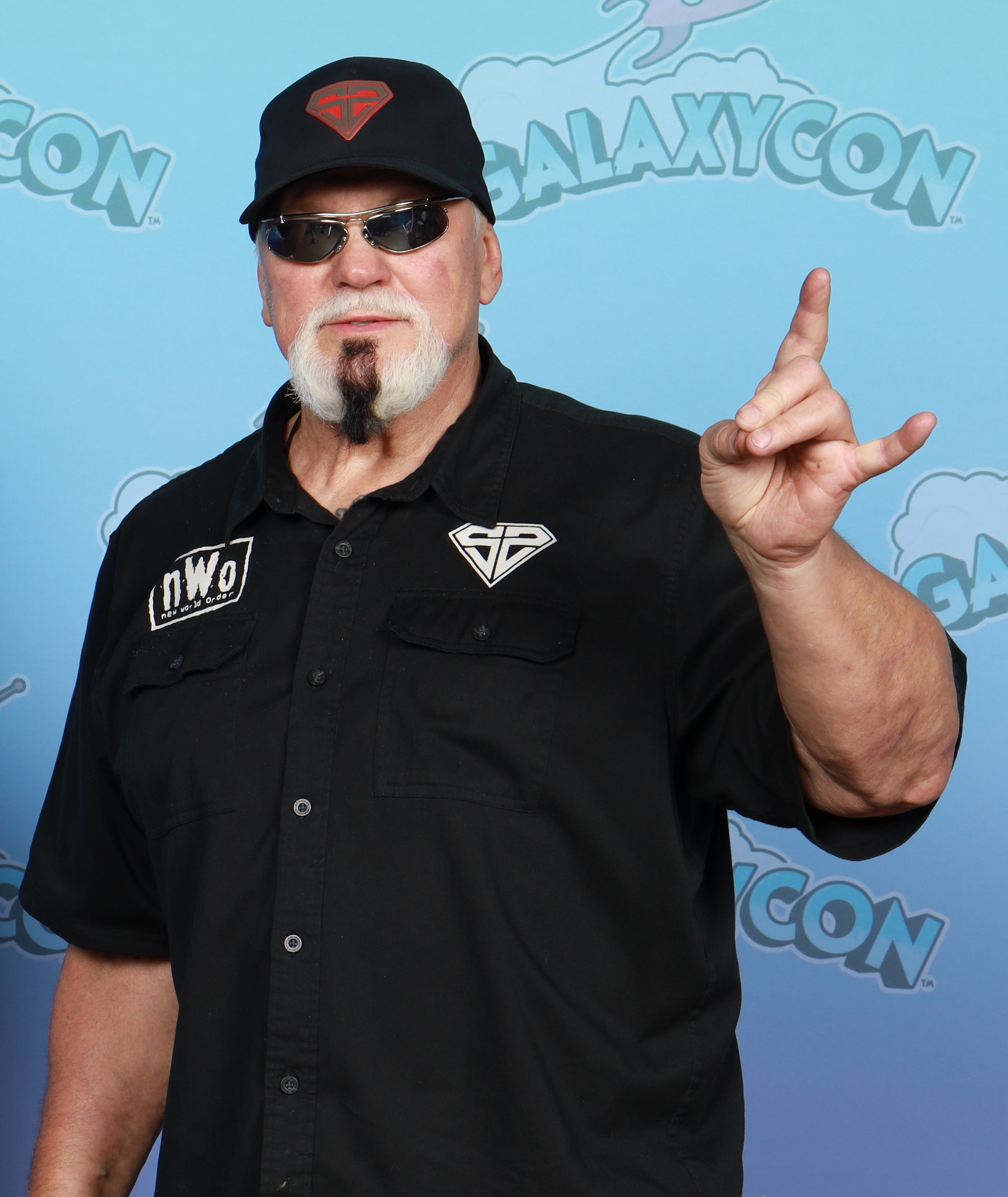
- Steiner in 2025

Personal information
- Born: Scott Rechsteiner; July 29, 1962 (age 64) Bay City, Michigan, U.S.
- Education: University of Michigan
- Spouse: Christa Podsedly (m. 2000)
- Children: 2
- Relatives: Rick Steiner (brother); Bron Breakker (nephew)

Professional wrestling career
- Ring name(s): Scott Rechsteiner; Scott Steiner
- Billed height: 6 ft 1 in (185 cm)
- Billed weight: 276 lb (125 kg)
- Billed from: Detroit, Michigan
- Trained by: Dr. Jerry Graham Jr. The Sheik
- Debut: August 14, 1986
- Retired: April 22, 2023

Scott Rechsteiner (born July 29, 1962), better known by the ring name Scott Steiner, is an American professional wrestler.

Steiner is known for his time in World Championship Wrestling (WCW), and has also wrestled for Jim Crockett Promotions (JCP), World Wrestling Federation/Entertainment (WWF/WWE), Total Nonstop Action Wrestling (TNA, later Impact Wrestling), and Extreme Championship Wrestling (ECW). He is a four-time world champion in wrestling, being a one-time WCW World Heavyweight Champion, a one-time WWA World Heavyweight Champion, and a one-time WWC Universal Heavyweight Champion and a one-time WWA World Heavyweight Champion (Indianapolis version). He is the eighth WCW Triple Crown Champion.

During the 1980s and 1990s, Steiner wrestled alongside his older brother Rick as The Steiner Brothers. He has won several tag team titles, including the WWF Tag Team Championship, WCW World Tag Team Championship, IWGP Tag Team Championship, and the TNA/Impact World Tag Team Championship. He headlined multiple pay-per-view events for WCW and TNA, as well as the WWF's Survivor Series in 1993.

== Early life ==
Scott Rechsteiner was born in Bay City, Michigan, on July 29, 1962. He attended Western High School in Auburn before earning a wrestling scholarship to the University of Michigan, where he graduated with a degree in education. At Michigan, he was a folkstyle wrestler at 156 lbs, becoming a three-time Big 10 runner-up after finishing fifth as a freshman. In 1986, he became an NCAA Division I All-American and placed sixth in the nation his senior year. His brother, Rick Steiner, also wrestled for Michigan and became a professional wrestler.

== Professional wrestling career ==
=== Early career (1986–1989) ===
Rechsteiner trained under Dr. Jerry Graham Jr. at Torio's Health Club in Toledo, Ohio, as well as The Sheik, and debuted under his real name in the Indianapolis-based World Wrestling Association in 1986. On August 14, 1986, in Dearborn, Michigan, Rechsteiner defeated The Great Wojo for the WWA World Heavyweight Championship. He held the title until May 3, 1987, when he lost it to Wojo in Toledo. He then formed a tag team with his trainer, Graham. On October 6, 1987, they defeated Chris Carter and Mohammad Saad for the WWA World Tag Team Championship. On December 6, they lost the title to Carter and Don Kent.

In 1988, Rechsteiner joined the Memphis, Tennessee-based Continental Wrestling Association (CWA) under his real name. He formed a tag team with Billy Joe Travis and defeated the Cuban Choir Boys for the CWA Tag Team Championship on May 29. On June 6, they lost the title to Gary Young and Don Bass. Rechsteiner and Travis regained the title on June 27 and lost it to the Rock 'n' Roll RPMs (Mike Davis and Tommy Lane) on August 15. Rechsteiner formed a new tag team with Jed Grundy, and on February 18, 1989, they dethroned CWA Tag Team Champions Robert Fuller and Jimmy Golden. Rechsteiner's third and final CWA Tag Team Championship reign ended on February 25, when Fuller and Golden regained the titles. He left the CWA soon after.

=== World Championship Wrestling (1989–1992) ===
Rechsteiner, under the ring name Scott Steiner, debuted in World Championship Wrestling (WCW) during a backstage interview at Chi-Town Rumble, later accompanying his brother Rick to the ring as he lost the NWA World Television Championship to Mike Rotunda. Scott would begin wrestling in singles bouts on WCW programming before the Steiners began teaming together. The Steiners lost their first high-profile bout to Kevin Sullivan & Rotunda at Clash of the Champions VII but defeated them in a rematch at the Great American Bash 1989. The Steiners also competed in the "King of the Hill" two-ring battle royal earlier in the show but were unsuccessful.

During this time, the Steiners were managed by Missy Hyatt and often brought their pitbull Arnold to the ring. Rick nervously began a relationship with a shy fan named "Robin Green" who eventually received a make-over and transformed into Woman. Green was responsible for tripping up Scott at Clash of the Champions VIII and costing the Steiners the NWA World Tag Team Championship as well as luring Scott into a parking lot assault by Sullivan and her new masked tag team, Doom. Doom, with Woman in their corner, defeated the Steiners at Halloween Havoc '89 after Woman interfered.

On November 1, 1989, in Atlanta, Georgia, The Steiner Brothers defeated The Fabulous Freebirds (Michael Hayes and Jimmy Garvin) for the NWA World Tag Team Championship. They held the title for over five months before losing it to Doom (Butch Reed and Ron Simmons) in Washington, D.C., at Capital Combat. The Steiner Brothers defeated The Midnight Express (Bobby Eaton and Stan Lane) for the NWA United States Tag Team Championship on August 24, in East Rutherford, New Jersey. During their title reign, WCW withdrew from the National Wrestling Alliance (in January 1991) and the title was renamed the WCW United States Tag Team Championship. The Steiner Brothers competed in a WarGames match at WrestleWar 1991. After winning the WCW World Tag Team Championship on February 18, they vacated the United States Tag Team Championship, on February 20. After they won the IWGP Tag Team Championship from Hiroshi Hase and Kensuke Sasaki at the WCW/New Japan Supershow on March 21, announcers began referring to them as "Triple Crown Champions".

In 1990, Steiner began wrestling in singles matches. WCW's weekend TBS shows (Power Hour, Saturday Night, and Main Event), featured the NWA/WCW Gauntlet Series, in which a wrestler was selected to face a different top star on each show that weekend, winning $10,000 if they defeated all three. Steiner was the first to successfully "run the gauntlet" from September 21–23, defeating Bobby Eaton, Ric Flair and Arn Anderson. On January 30, 1991, Steiner had a WCW World Heavyweight Championship match against Flair at Clash of the Champions XIV: Dixie Dynamite, which ended in a time limit draw. In late 1992 the Steiners temporarily disbanded when Rick suffered a torn pectoral muscle. Scott then started wrestling single matches, and then later teased a heel turn when he teamed with Marcus Bagwell against Steve Austin and Brian Pillman on an October 10, 1992, episode of WCW WorldWide. During the match Bagwell was injured when he was attacked by Arn Anderson and when Steiner went to tag Bagwell, he was unable to. An angry Steiner then kicked Bagwell and slammed him into the ring where he was attacked by Austin and Pillman who then won the match. Shortly after he won the WCW World Television Championship on October 17, 1992. Steiner later vacated the title when The Steiner Brothers left WCW for the World Wrestling Federation (WWF) that November, after a contract dispute with WCW Executive Vice President Bill Watts.

=== World Wrestling Federation (1992–1994) ===
WWF talent relation officials Pat Patterson and Bruce Prichard were enamored with Scott Steiner and pitched an idea to Vince McMahon for Scott to come in as a surprise entry into the Royal Rumble in 1993 and win the event, then moving on to win the world championship at WrestleMania IX. However Vince was not keen on the idea and both the Steiners themselves voiced their desire to remain as a tag team, therefore Vince began booking them as such. The Steiner Brothers made their WWF television debut with a promo on the December 21, 1992, episode of Prime Time Wrestling. They appeared on the debut episode of Raw on January 11, 1993. Their pay-per-view debut came on January 24, at the 1993 Royal Rumble, where they defeated The Beverly Brothers (Blake and Beau). At WrestleMania IX on April 4, The Steiner Brothers defeated The Headshrinkers (Samu and Fatu).

After WrestleMania, The Steiner Brothers feuded with Money Inc. (Ted DiBiase and Irwin R. Schyster). At King of the Ring on June 13, The Steiner Brothers and The Smokin' Gunns (Billy and Bart) defeated The Headshrinkers and Money Inc. in an eight-man tag match. The following evening in Columbus, Ohio, in an untelevised match at a Raw taping, The Steiner Brothers defeated Money Inc. for the WWF World Tag Team Championship. Money Inc. regained the title on June 16, at a house show in Rockford, Illinois, and lost it back to The Steiner Brothers at another house show, on June 19, in St. Louis, Missouri.

The Steiner Brothers defended the title against The Heavenly Bodies (Tom Prichard and Jimmy Del Ray) at SummerSlam on August 30 in their home state of Michigan and walked away victoriously with a pinfall win.

On the September 13 episode of Raw in New York, New York, The Steiner Brothers defended the title against The Quebecers (Jacques and Pierre) in a "Province of Quebec Rules" match, wherein the title could change hands via disqualification. The match ended when the manager of The Quebecers, Johnny Polo, threw a hockey stick into the ring and Scott caught it. When the referee saw Scott holding the foreign object, he disqualified The Steiner Brothers and awarded the title to The Quebecers. Scott defeated Pierre in a singles match the following week on Raw. Steiner competed in the elimination match main event of Survivor Series, marking his only headlining WWF pay-per-view appearance. On January 22, 1994, Scott Steiner was the first entrant in the Royal Rumble. After nine minutes, he was eliminated by Diesel. Following this, the Steiner Brothers left the WWF in mid-1994.

=== New Japan Pro Wrestling (1991–1995) ===
In 1991, the Steiners worked for New Japan Pro-Wrestling while under contract with WCW and WWF. On March 21, 1991, they defeated Hiroshi Hase and Kensuke Sasaki for the IWGP Tag Team Championship. They dropped the titles to Hase and Keiji Muto on November 5. Then On June 26, 1992, they defeated Big Van Vader and Bam Bam Bigelow for the titles. They dropped them to Scott Norton and Tony Halme on November 22. During their time in the WWF, they only did a few matches.

In 1994 after leaving the WWF, they returned to Japan as full-time workers until the end of 1995.

=== Extreme Championship Wrestling (1995) ===
On July 28, 1995, The Steiner Brothers debuted in Extreme Championship Wrestling (ECW), at The Orange County Fairgrounds in Middletown, New York, defeating D'Von Dudley and Vampire Warrior. Rick had been in ECW by himself since April 1995. On August 4, in The Flagstaff in Jim Thorpe, Pennsylvania, they defeated D'Von Dudley and 2 Cold Scorpio. They made their ECW Arena debut on August 5, at Wrestlepalooza, teaming with Eddie Guerrero to lose to Scorpio, Dean Malenko, and Cactus Jack. On August 25, in Jim Thorpe, they defeated Scorpio and Malenko, and defeated Scorpio and Chris Benoit the following evening. On August 28, they defeated Dudley Dudley and Dances with Dudley in the Big Apple Dinner Theater in Kennett Square, Pennsylvania. At Gangstas Paradise on September 16, they teamed with Taz and lost to The Eliminators (John Kronus and Perry Saturn) and Jason. On September 23, in Middletown, they defeated Raven and Stevie Richards. Scott Steiner made his final ECW appearance on October 28, teaming with Taz and losing to The Eliminators.

=== Return to WCW (1996–2001) ===
==== Steiner Brothers (1996–1998) ====
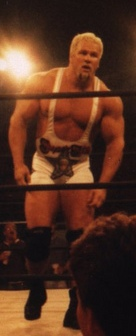
Steiner during a taping of Nitro in 1998

The Steiner Brothers rejoined WCW in 1996, debuting on the March 11 edition of Monday Nitro. They won the World Tag Team Championship from Harlem Heat on July 24, but proceeded to lose it back to them just three days later. After the formation of the New World Order (nWo), the Steiner Brothers feuded with The Outsiders, who had won the World Tag Team Championship from Harlem Heat. The Steiners won the tag belts at Souled Out on January 25, 1997. The following Nitro, Eric Bischoff stripped them of the titles and returned them to The Outsiders due to WCW referee Randy Anderson, who was not an official referee for Souled Out, counting the fall. Harlem Heat would challenge the Steiners for their spot as contenders for the tag belts. The Steiners eventually won and earned a match with the Outsiders at Road Wild on August 9. Scott would cover Scott Hall for the fall but Kevin Nash pulled referee Nick Patrick out of the ring and Patrick ended the match as disqualification. The Steiners finally won the belts on October 13, defeating Hall and Syxx, who wrestled in the injured Nash's place via "Wolfpac Rules".

From mid 1997 into early 1998, Scott Steiner underwent noticeable physical changes, such as massively increasing his muscle mass, cutting his signature mullet and growing a goatee. During this period, Steiner feuded with nWo member Buff Bagwell over who had the better physique. In early 1998, he began leaving Rick in the ring by himself during tag team matches, or starting the match without ever tagging his brother in.

==== New World Order (1998–2000) ====
On February 22, 1998, Steiner joined the nWo at SuperBrawl VIII, by attacking his brother Rick while they were defending the WCW World Tag Team Championship against The Outsiders, whom he personally handed the belts to. The next night, on Nitro he adopted a new gimmick, dyeing his hair and beard blond, and further increasing his muscle mass over the ensuing months. Scott then adopted the nicknames "White Thunder", in reference to his bleached hair and goatee and his all-white singlet, and "Superstar", as a homage to "Superstar" Billy Graham. However, he soon discarded both nicknames, and instead proclaimed himself as "Big Poppa Pump". Steiner further altered his attire as he began wearing sunglasses and chain mail headgear as part of his ring entrance outfit. He then began teaming with Buff Bagwell and feuded with Rick for much of 98. At the same time, the nWo would split into rival factions, nWo Wolfpack led by Nash and nWo Hollywood led by Hollywood Hogan. Steiner and Bagwell established themselves as members of the latter. In November, Steiner would become leader of nWo Hollywood after Hogan went on hiatus.

In early 1999, Steiner would become a prominent member of a newly reunited nWo elite following the Fingerpoke of Doom. He feuded with Goldberg, Diamond Dallas Page, Booker T, and The Four Horsemen and won the United States Heavyweight Championship and World Television Championship. In March, he turned on Bagwell, kicking him out of the group, and eventually reunited with his brother. In mid-1999, he was sidelined with a back injury and stripped of the United States Heavyweight Title. On a December 1999 episode of Nitro, Steiner cut a promo to announce his retirement from professional wrestling due to this injury. Later that evening, he revealed himself to, in fact, be in fine health, turning on and attacking Sid Vicious. He continued to be a top heel into 2000 and joined the reformed nWo.

==== Main event push and WCW World Heavyweight Champion (2000–2001) ====
After the nWo disbanded again, Steiner briefly joined Vince Russo and Eric Bischoff's New Blood stable before switching to The Millionaire's Club, turning face for a brief time. At Spring Stampede on April 16, 2000, he competed in a tournament for the United States Championship, defeating The Wall by disqualification when he blinded him, which caused Wall to accidentally chokeslam the referee through a table instead. He then defeated Mike Awesome by submission with his finisher, the Steiner Recliner before ultimately winning the tournament after defeating Sting in the finals, albeit due to interference from Sting's previous opponent Vampiro. Steiner would also feud with Tank Abbott and his brother, a now-heel Rick. Steiner would turn heel again on former nWo teammate Kevin Nash at Bash at the Beach on July 9 by helping Goldberg defeat him in a match where fellow nWo alumnus Scott Hall's contract was on the line, joining the New Blood in the process.

On November 26 at Mayhem, Steiner defeated Booker T to win the WCW World Heavyweight Championship, becoming a Triple Crown Champion in the process. In January 2001, Steiner became the centerpiece of Ric Flair's Magnificent Seven stable. He feuded with Booker T over several months and pay-per-views until losing the WCW World Heavyweight Championship back to him on the final episode of Nitro on March 26. After WCW was purchased by the WWF, Rechsteiner, unlike many of his colleagues, did not join the WWF and instead opted to wait until his contract with AOL Time Warner expired later that year before seeking other opportunities.

=== World Wrestling All-Stars (2001–2002) ===
After his contract with AOL Time Warner expired in November 2001, Rechsteiner joined the World Wrestling All-Stars, where he was reunited with his former WCW valet Midajah. He appeared at WWA house shows in Europe and Australia throughout 2001 and 2002. At the third WWA pay-per-view, The Eruption, on April 12, 2002, at the Rod Laver Arena in Melbourne, Steiner challenged Nathan Jones for the WWA World Heavyweight Championship. Despite the presence of WWA Commissioner Sid at ringside, Steiner was able to cheat his way to victory, striking Jones with the title belt and making Jones submit with the Steiner Recliner. Steiner held the belt for several months (although never defending it) before vacating it in November 2002 and leaving WWA for World Wrestling Entertainment (WWE). Before joining WWE, Steiner teamed with his brother Rick to defeat Hiroshi Tanahashi and Kensuke Sasaki on May 2, 2002, in Japan, on New Japan Pro-Wrestling's 30th Anniversary show.

=== Return to WWE (2002–2004) ===
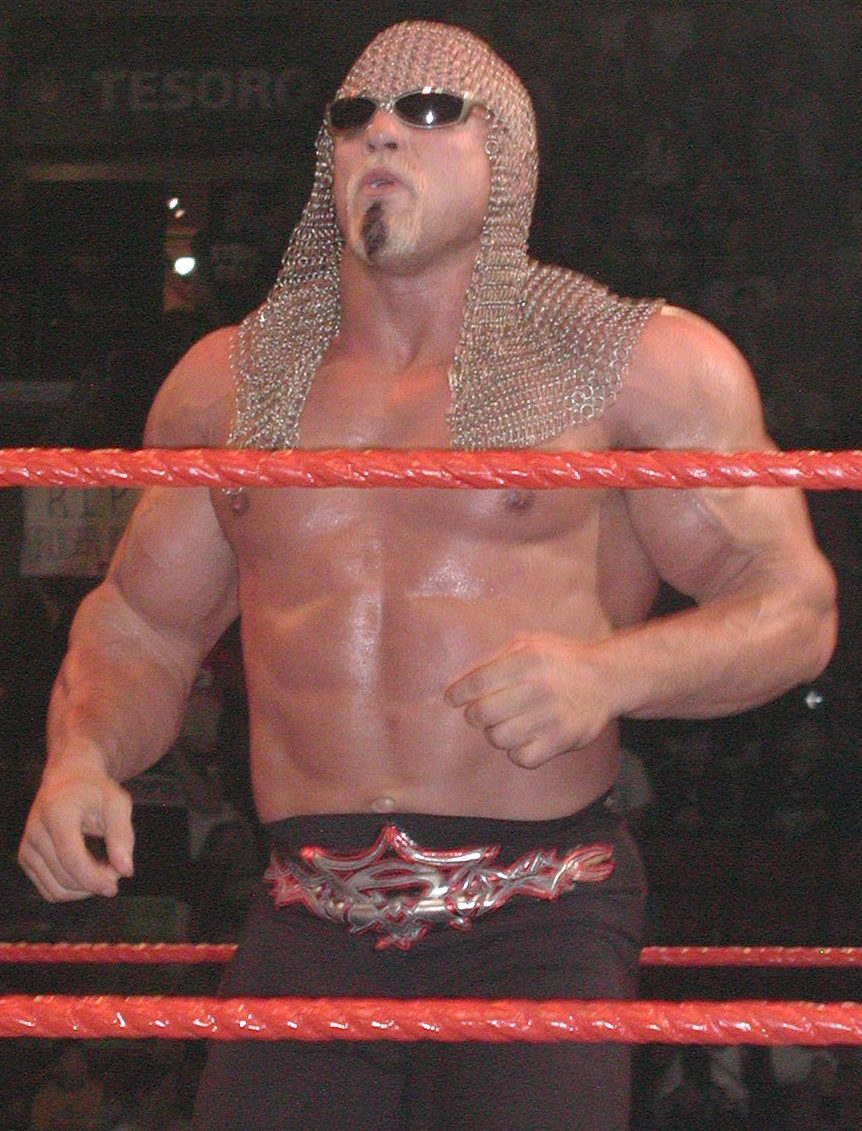
Steiner in WWE in 2003

In October 2002, Steiner signed a three-year contract with World Wrestling Entertainment, and returned to WWE television after an eight-year absence at Survivor Series in Madison Square Garden on November 17. There, Steiner attacked Matt Hardy and Christopher Nowinski after they delivered a promo insulting New York City, establishing him as a face.

Over the following weeks, General Managers Eric Bischoff and Stephanie McMahon both courted Steiner, each trying to sign him to their respective brand, Raw or SmackDown!. Bischoff was ultimately successful, after McMahon rejected Steiner's sexual advances.

On Raw in January 2003 Steiner began feuding with World Heavyweight Champion Triple H, and his faction Evolution. They began competing against one another for strength and muscle conditioning leading to world title matches at the Royal Rumble on January 19 and No Way Out on February 23. Steiner won the first match by disqualification after Triple H attacked him with a sledgehammer, but lost the second match at No Way Out via pinfall. Both matches were not well received by fans with the first going on to win the Wrestling Observer Newsletter's "Worst Worked Match" award.

On the April 14 episode of Raw, Steiner faced off against Nowinski in a debate over the Iraq War. Later that year, Steiner formed a tag team with Test, with Stacy Keibler as their manager. The team lasted several months, and feuded with La Résistance, losing to them at Judgment Day on May 18. They broke up after Test turned heel and began misogynistically treating Keibler. On June 15, Steiner defeated Test in a grudge match to win the managerial services of Keibler at Bad Blood, but lost her back to Test in a rematch on the August 18 episode of Raw. At Unforgiven on September 21, Steiner faced Test with Keibler's managerial services again on the line with the extra stipulation that, if Steiner lost, he would become Test's manservant. Steiner lost after Keibler's interference backfired, and the tag team was reunited at Test's behest. After another mistake by Keibler cost the team a match on the September 29 episode of Raw, Steiner belly to belly suplexed her, resulting in Steiner turning heel and teaming on better terms with Test as Keibler was forced to remain their reluctant manager. At Survivor Series on November 16, Steiner and Team Bischoff defeated Team Austin in a 5-on-5 Survivor Series elimination match in which he was first man eliminated. On the December 1 episode of Raw, Mick Foley fired (kayfabe) Steiner and Test, freeing Keibler as their manager. At Armageddon on December 14, Steiner and Test competed in a Tag Team Turmoil match for the World Tag Team Championship which was won by Evolution (Batista and Ric Flair). On the January 19, 2004 episode of Raw, Steiner lost to Goldberg in a triple threat match also involving Test. Steiner's last WWE match was as a part of the Royal Rumble match at the Royal Rumble on January 25, lasting six minutes before being eliminated by Booker T. Steiner suffered an injury, sidelining him for two months. While injured, he was released from WWE on August 17.

=== Independent circuit (2004–2006) ===
Rechsteiner underwent foot surgery in July 2004, having six screws inserted into his foot, a tendon transplant, and a bone graft. He then convalesced in a cast for eight months. Scott Steiner returned to the ring on August 28, 2005, in Asheville, North Carolina for the independent promotion, Universal Championship Wrestling, teaming with his brother Rick in 2006. On June 10, 2006, they defeated Disco Inferno and Jeff Lewis. He wrestled briefly in LAW, alongside Buff Bagwell, and feuded with the tag team Fame and Fortune.

On March 11, 2006, the Steiner Brothers defeated Eddie Venom and Elvis Elliot at a UCW wrestling show in Bay City, Michigan.

On June 2, 2006, the Steiner Brothers defeated Elvis Elliot and Original Sinn (Sinn Bodhi) at a UCW wrestling show at Bay City Western High School in Auburn, Michigan entitled "Steiner Brothers Return Home."

=== Total Nonstop Action Wrestling (2006–2010) ===
==== Alliance with Jeff Jarrett (2006–2007) ====
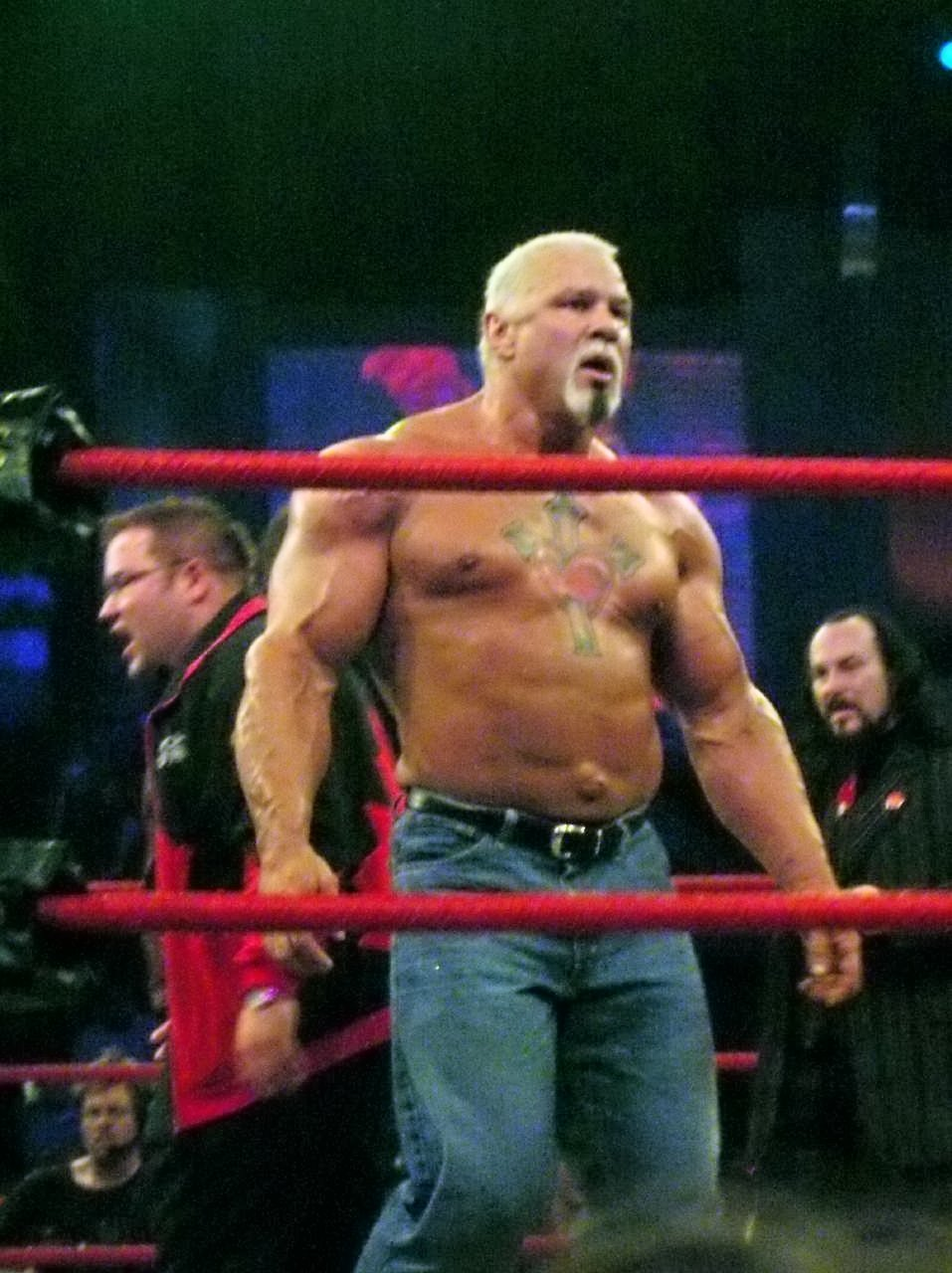
Steiner in TNA

Steiner debuted in Total Nonstop Action Wrestling (TNA) at Destination X on March 12, 2006, as a heel, before making his Impact! debut on March 18, identifying himself as Jeff Jarrett's bodyguard. In subsequent weeks, he attacked TNA wrestlers and staff, demanding to be hired.

At Lockdown on April 23, Steiner, Jarrett, and America's Most Wanted lost to Sting, A.J. Styles, Ron Killings, and Rhino in a Lethal Lockdown match. Steiner and Jarrett then challenged Sting and a partner of his choosing to face them at Sacrifice on May 14. Sting hinted at three potential partners (Buff Bagwell, Lex Luger and Rick Steiner) before choosing Samoa Joe. Sting and Joe defeated Steiner and Jarrett.

After failing to defeat Sting to qualify for the third King of the Mountain match, Steiner lost to Samoa Joe at Slammiversary on June 18. At Victory Road on July 16, he faced Joe, Sting, and Christian Cage in a four-way bout to decide the number one contender for Jarrett's NWA World Heavyweight Championship. Sting pinned Steiner to win, and Steiner resumed his role as Jarrett's bodyguard. He then faced Christian Cage on the August 10 Impact and was in Jarrett's corner at Hard Justice on August 13 before disappearing from TNA.

On February 8, 2007, Steiner returned as NWA World Heavyweight Champion Christian Cage's "special consultant", in Cage's match with Kurt Angle at Against All Odds on February 11, interfering to cost Angle the match and joining Christian's Coalition. Steiner eliminated Angle in a gauntlet match to determine a number one contender, then lost to him at Destination X on March 11. At Lockdown on April 15, Steiner was part of Team Cage, which lost to Team Angle in a Lethal Lockdown match.

==== Steiner Brothers reunion and various storylines (2007–2008) ====
At Sacrifice on May 13, the Steiner Brothers reunited. They were scheduled to wrestle Team 3D in a "dream match" at Slammiversary on June 17, but Scott was replaced by Road Warrior Animal after suffering a severe throat injury. Steiner returned on July 15, at Victory Road, costing Brother Ray a match. At Bound for Glory on October 14, The Steiner Brothers defeated Team 3D in a 2-out-of-3 Tables Match. At Genesis on November 11, they unsuccessfully challenged the tag team champions, Tomko and A.J. Styles.

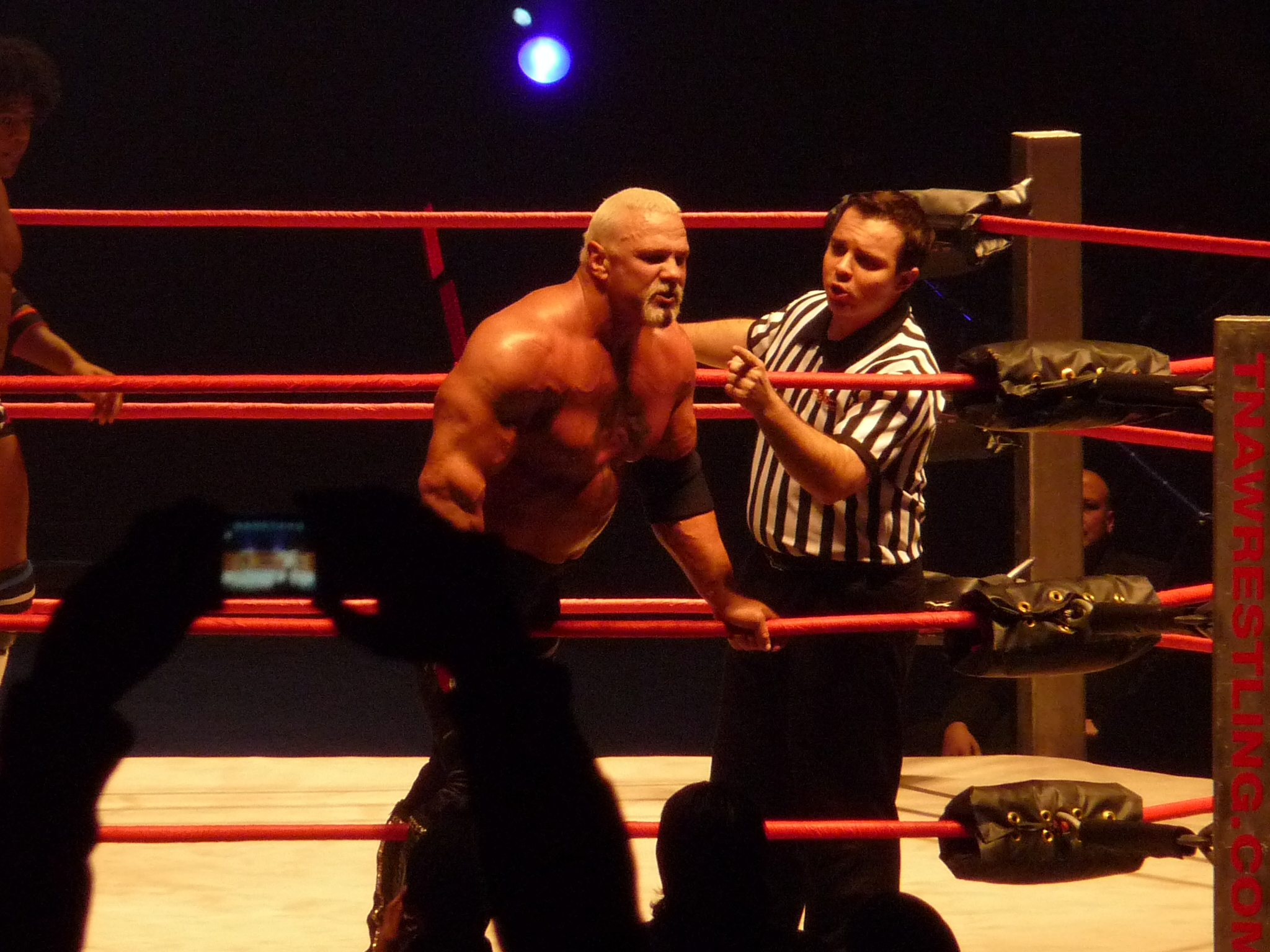
Steiner at a house show in TNA

At Turning Point on December 2, Steiner competed in the "Feast or Fired Battle Royal", winning a briefcase containing a contract for a TNA World Heavyweight Championship match. On the December 13 episode of Impact!, he beat Petey Williams, B.G. James, and Christopher Daniels. Following the match, Jim Cornette offered him $50,000 for his briefcase, which he refused. Steiner then switched briefcases with Petey Williams (which contained an X Division Title contract), stating afterwards he would get his original briefcase back the next week. At Against All Odds on February 10, 2008, Steiner defeated Williams to win both briefcases, after a distraction from an unknown woman later introduced as Rhaka Khan. After winning both cases, Steiner issued a challenge to anyone, which Williams answered. Williams lost after more interference by Khan. Steiner then took Williams as his protégé and gave him the X Division briefcase on the April 17 edition of Impact!. Later that night, Williams cashed in the opportunity, beating Jay Lethal for the X Division title with the Canadian Destroyer. At Sacrifice on May 11, Steiner cashed in his briefcase and faced Samoa Joe for the TNA World Heavyweight Championship. During the lead-up to the match, Steiner would make his now-infamous "Scott Steiner math" promo by saying that Samoa Joe had "8 and a 1/3% chance of winning" while Steiner had "141 and 2/3% chance of winning". However, Kurt Angle fell out of the mix by suffering an injury, which rendered Steiner's arithmetic obsolete. He lost, and tore his ACL, sidelining him and requiring surgery.

==== Main Event Mafia (2008–2010) ====
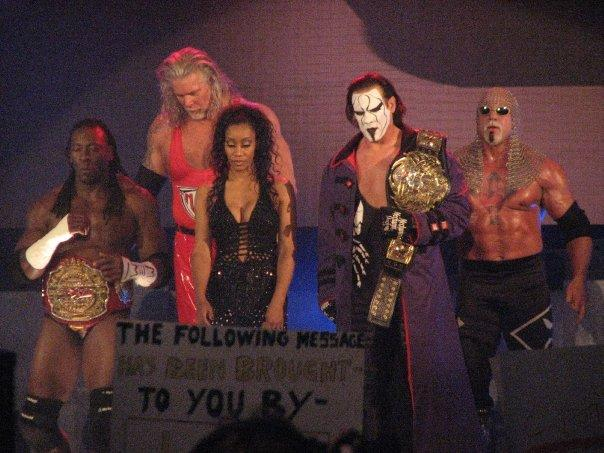
Steiner with The Main Event Mafia

On the October 30 Impact!, Steiner returned, joining The Main Event Mafia and attacking several wrestlers with a lead pipe. On the November 13 Impact!, he turned on former protégé Petey Williams after Williams tried to talk with him about the Main Event Mafia situation. Steiner threw him off a ladder and the Main Event Mafia attacked him backstage.

At Genesis on January 11, 2009, Mick Foley, A.J. Styles and Brother Devon defeated Steiner, Booker T, and Cute Kip when Foley pinned Steiner after a double underhook DDT onto a steel chair. At Against All Odds on February 8, Steiner pinned Williams after a Steiner Screwdriver to end their feud.

Steiner and Booker T then formed a tag team. At Victory Road on July 19, they defeated Beer Money, Inc. (James Storm and Robert Roode) for the World Tag Team Championship. At Bound for Glory on October 18, they lost the titles to The British Invasion in a four way Full Metal Mayhem Tag Team match (which also included Team 3D and Beer Money).

On the following episode of Impact!, Angle announced the disbanding of the Main Event Mafia, which Steiner refused to accept. Steiner then feuded with Bobby Lashley, defeating him in a Falls Count Anywhere Match at Turning Point on November 15. The next month, at Final Resolution on December 20, Lashley defeated Steiner in a Last Man Standing match.

On February 4, 2010, Steiner's profile was removed from TNA's official website. His departure from TNA was confirmed the following week.

=== World Wrestling Council (2010) ===
Steiner joined the Puerto Rican promotion World Wrestling Council (WWC) in March 2010, debuting in an angle where he attacked Universal Heavyweight Champion Ray González. On April 3, at Camino a la Gloria 2010, Steiner wrestled his first match for WWC, losing to González in a championship match. On April 24, he defeated González in a rematch to become the new Universal Heavyweight Champion. On May 29, he was stripped of the title, after a defense against González ended in a no contest. On July 11, González defeated Steiner (in a match refereed by Ricky Banderas) to regain the WWC Universal Heavyweight Championship.

=== Return to TNA (2011–2012) ===
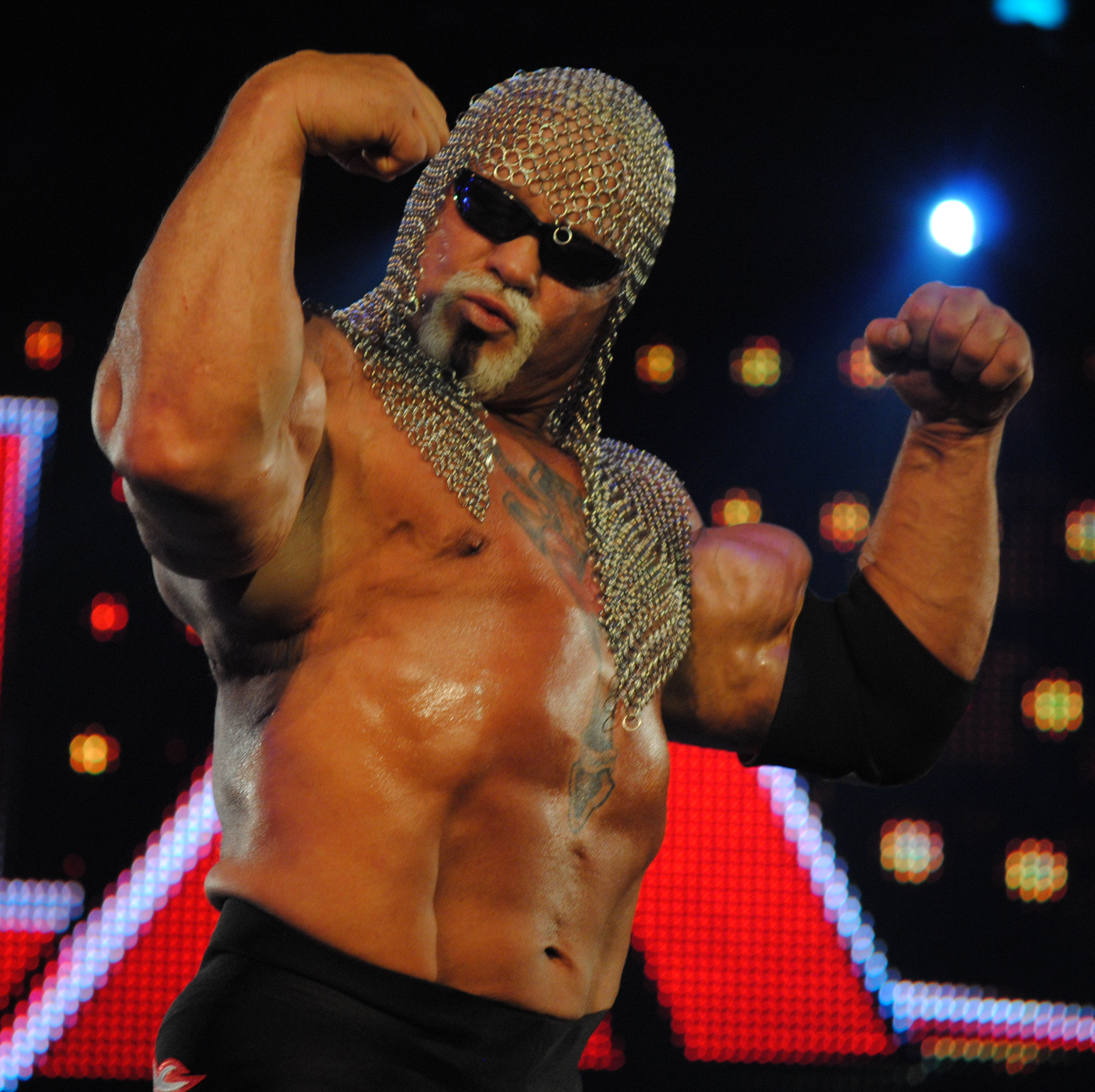
Steiner in TNA in 2011

On the January 27, 2011, episode of Impact! (taped January 12), Steiner returned to TNA as a face, saving Kurt Angle, Matt Morgan, and Crimson from Fortune and Immortal. The next week, Fortune turned on Immortal and aligned themselves with Steiner, Angle and Crimson. On February 13, at Against All Odds, Steiner, James Storm and Robert Roode defeated Immortal members Rob Terry, Gunner and Murphy in a six-man tag match. Steiner pinned Gunner after the Frankensteiner. Steiner then began feuding with Rob Terry after Terry attacked him on the February 24 Impact!, during a "posedown" between the two. The following week, Steiner defeated Terry in a singles match.

On the March 24 Impact!, Steiner formed a tag team with Crimson and defeated Ink Inc. (Jesse Neal and Shannon Moore). After the match, Moore disrespected Steiner. This led to a match between the two the following week, which Steiner won. On April 17, at Lockdown, Steiner and Crimson lost a four-way tag team number one contenders cage match to Ink Inc.

On the next episode of Impact!, Steiner turned heel by attacking Matt Morgan, after they had each announced their intention to win the TNA World Heavyweight Championship. The two brawled backstage on the April 28 Impact!. On the May 26 episode of the now renamed Impact Wrestling, Steiner interfered in and cost Morgan his match with Jeff Jarrett. On the June 2 Impact Wrestling, Steiner and Jarrett defeated Morgan and Kurt Angle, when Steiner pinned Morgan. At Slammiversary IX on June 12, Morgan defeated Steiner in a singles match to end the feud. On the June 30 episode of Impact Wrestling, Steiner joined Immortal. At Hardcore Justice on August 7, Immortal (Steiner, Abyss and Gunner) lost to Fortune (A.J. Styles, Christopher Daniels, and Kazarian). At Turning Point on November 13, Steiner and Bully Ray lost to former Immortal stablemates Mr. Anderson and Abyss in a tag team match.

After a spell with TNA's Ring Ka King affiliate in India, in which he lost against Matt Morgan in the final of an eight-man elimination tournament for the inaugural RKK World Heavyweight Championship, and partnered with Abyss to win the RKK Tag Team Championship (beating Davey Boy Smith Jr. and Chavo Guerrero Jr.), Rechsteiner was subsequently released from TNA in March 2012.

=== Return to the independent circuit (2010–2020) ===
In 2010, Steiner defeated Brutus Beefcake to become Canadian Wrestling International (CWI)'s first Heavyweight Champion in Caledonia, Ontario. He retained the title in matches against Kevin Nash and Big Van Vader.

Following his departure from TNA, Steiner began performing for various European promotions on a European tour. On May 31, 2013, the Steiner Brothers won the Preston City Wrestling Tag Team Championship before losing it the following day. On June 2, Steiner won the Dutch Pro Wrestling Heavyweight Championship. On June 23, the Steiner Brothers defeated Eddie Kingston and Homicide at the House of Hardcore 2 event.

On June 7, 2015, Steiner was pinned by Rob Van Dam at Citi Field`s Legends of Wrestling show. After the match Steiner and Doc Gallows attacked Van Dam leading to Goldberg coming to the aid of Van Dam and spearing Steiner.

On February 29, 2020, they teamed with a 79 year old Dory Funk Jr. to defeat Blain Rage, Jake Logan, and Shane Chung in a six-man tag team match at Funk's FC !Bang! promotion in Ocala, Florida.

=== Second return to Impact Wrestling (2017–2019) ===
On April 23, 2017, Steiner returned to TNA (by then, renamed Impact Wrestling), aligning himself with Josh Mathews. On July 2, 2017, at Slammiversary XV Steiner returned to action teaming with Josh Mathews in a losing effort to Joseph Park and Jeremy Borash.

At the April 22, 2018, television tapings Steiner was announced as Eli Drake's partner for the Impact World Tag Team Championship match against The Latin American Xchange at Redemption. Steiner and Drake went on to win the tag team titles. A few weeks later, Steiner and Drake retained the Impact World Tag Team Championships in a rematch against LAX. On the May 17, 2018 episode of Impact Wrestling , Steiner and Drake lost the Impact World Tag Team Championships to Andrew Everett and DJZ. On the May 31, 2018, episode of Impact Wrestling: Under Pressure, Steiner was defeated by his former partner Eli Drake ending their partnership following their title loss. On the January 11, 2019, episode of Impact Wrestling, Steiner made a special return during Scarlett Bordeaux's Smoke Show segment attacking The Desi Hit Squad. On the August 2, 2019 Unbreakable event, he teamed up with Petey Williams and Jordynne Grace in a six-man tag team match where they defeated Dicky Mayer, Gentleman Jervis and Ryan Taylor. This would be Steiner's only match in the year of 2019, as well as his final match in TNA.

=== National Wrestling Alliance (2019–2020) ===
Steiner made a surprise appearance at the December 17 tapings of NWA Powerrr. He was next seen on the January 7 episode where he was revealed to be the third member of Nick Aldis' team. He made his in ring debut on the following weeks episode, coming up short against team Morton. Steiner challenged Aron Stevens for the NWA National Championship at the Hard Times PPV. He defeated Stevens via Disqualification, meaning Stevens retained the championship.

=== Later career (2021-2023) ===
After suffering a heart attack in March 2020, Steiner returned to wrestling a year and a half later on September 18, 2021 when he lost to Jerry Lawler at Jerry Lawler's Wrestling Reunion in Tunica, Mississippi. Six months later, Steiner had a rematch with Lawler which ended in a no contest for USA Pro 29th Anniversary Show in Orlando, Florida on March 19, 2022.

On November 27, 2022, Steiner won the Jimmy Valiant Boogie Woogie Battle Royal featuring 18 competitors at Big Time Wrestling in Raleigh, North Carolina.

Steiner's last match was on April 22, 2023, a win over Ric Caurdiea UPW Pro Wrestling in Marquette, Michigan.

=== WWE Hall of Fame induction (2022) ===
On April 1, 2022, the Steiner Brothers were inducted in the WWE Hall of Fame.

== Professional wrestling style and persona ==
During his early years working with his brother Rick, they used an athletic style mixed with amateur background focused on suplex-based moves. He also created and popularized the Frankensteiner move, a Huracánrana where the opponent does not hit the ring with their back, but with their head instead. He also created the Steiner Screwdriver, a vertical suplex transitioned into a reverse piledriver.

Talking about his time as WCW World Champion, Eric Bischoff praised Steiner's skills and said, "I liked what he could do in the ring and his in-ring abilities were nothing short of amazing [but] he was volatile in and out of the ring."

On May 1, 2008, during the build up to that year's Sacrifice, before his match against Samoa Joe and Kurt Angle, Steiner cut a promo talking about his chances of winning. This promo is notable due to Steiner's humorous abuse of numbers, percentages, and math. His "Steiner Math" promo has been parodied several times by wrestlers and other people not associated with wrestling.

== Other media ==
In 2000 Steiner made an appearance in Charmed season 3 “Wrestling with Demons”

In 2001 Steiner appeared in an episode of The Jersey ("The Sadie Incident") alongside Booker T.

In 2017, Steiner made his acting debut in the Costa Rican-Indian film 1 Chor 2 Mastikhor.

In 2022 Steiner made an appearance on Judge Steve Harvey with wrestling promoter Ronnie Gossett.

== Business ventures ==
From April 2016 until August 2020, Rechsteiner and his wife operated a Shoney's restaurant in Acworth, Georgia.

== Personal life ==
Steiner has been married to Christa Podsedly since June 7, 2000. They have two children together, Brandon and Brock. Brandon is a point guard on the Kansas State men's basketball team, while Brock plays professional football as a wide receiver for the New Orleans Saints. His nephew Bronson Rechsteiner is also a professional wrestler and is currently signed to WWE, performing under the name Bron Breakker.

Despite at times having on-screen alliances with Hulk Hogan, Steiner in fact had a historically tense relationship with Hogan off-camera, with Steiner alleging that he learned Hogan, who held backstage influence, made efforts to hold him back while he was still in WCW.

=== Incidents and controversies ===
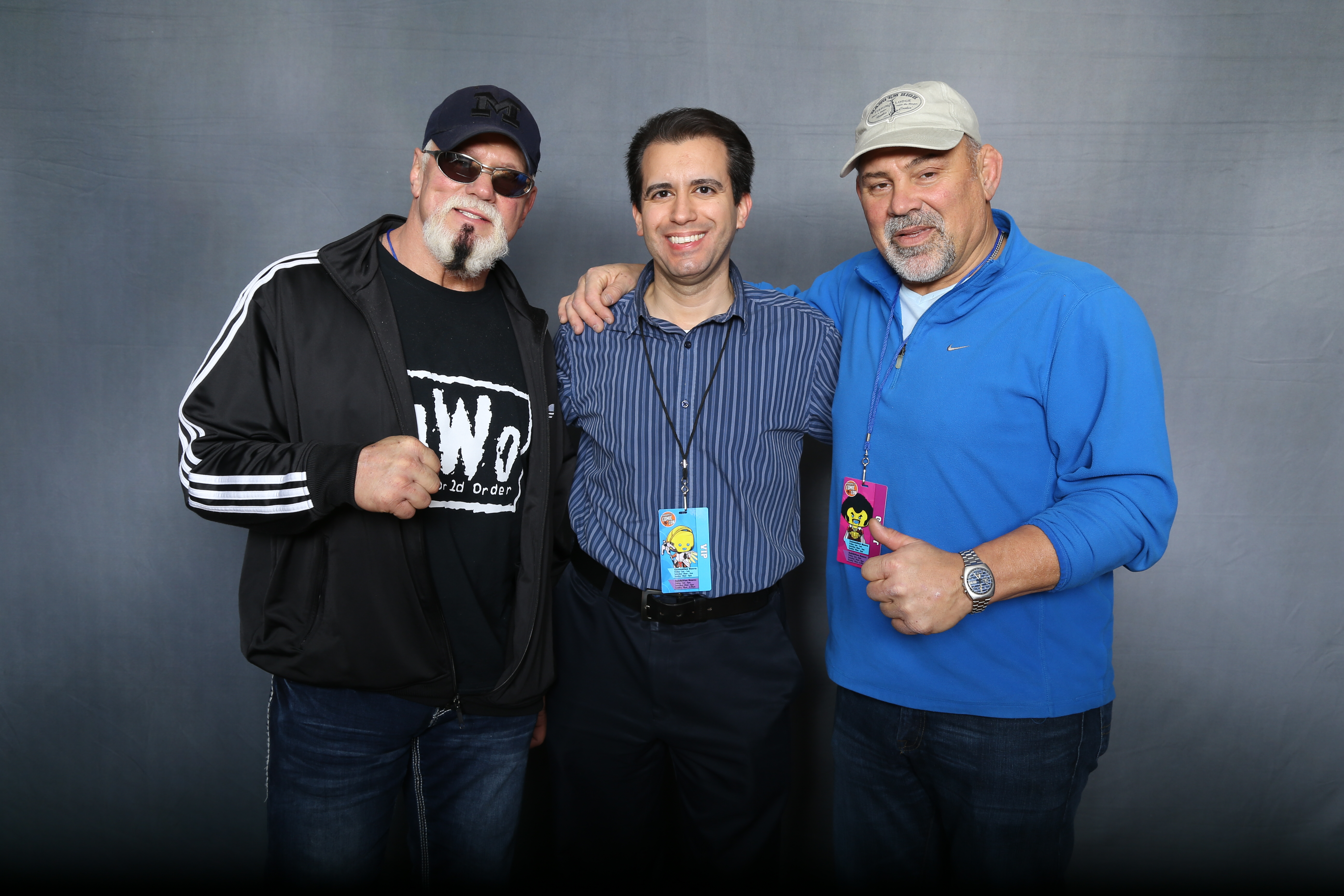
Rechsteiner and his brother and former tag team partner Rick posing with a fan in 2018

Rechsteiner's weight gain in the late 1990s led to allegations of steroid abuse, which he denied. Upon returning to WWE in late 2002, he was asked to undergo a steroid test, and agreed on the condition that Triple H take one as well; he claims that WWE did not follow through with either test.

On April 21, 1998, in Cherokee County, Georgia, Rechsteiner threatened Georgia Department of Transportation employee Paul Kaspereen after Kaspereen informed him that an exit ramp leading off Interstate 575 was closed. He then hit Kaspereen twice with his Ford F-250 pickup truck. Kaspereen was not seriously hurt. Rechsteiner was subsequently arrested and pleaded guilty on March 17, 1999, to aggravated assault and making terroristic threats, both of which are felonies carrying a maximum sentence of 30 years imprisonment. Under Georgia's first-offender rules, which stipulate that a first-time offender will be found not guilty if they do not violate the terms of their probation, Judge C. Michael Roach sentenced Rechsteiner to 10 days in Cherokee County Jail. He also placed Rechsteiner on seven years' probation; ordered him to pay $25,000 in fines, restitution, and legal fees; and made him perform 200 hours of community service.

In December 2005, Rechsteiner, Lex Luger, and Buff Bagwell were removed from a flight from Minneapolis to Winnipeg following a disturbance on board the plane. They were detained for several hours before Rechsteiner and Bagwell were released and permitted to continue on their journey; Luger, however, was held without bail and later charged and jailed. Rechsteiner would later refer to the incident during his in-character interviews, describing himself as a violent criminal with little regard for the forces of law and order.

Following his departure from TNA, Rechsteiner began expressing his disdain with TNA management via Twitter, specifically Hulk Hogan and Eric Bischoff. As a result, he was contacted by TNA's attorneys. After he continued making similar remarks, TNA filed a legal complaint against him in June 2012. He responded by filing a countersuit against TNA on September 10, claiming he was owed royalties. It was reported in November that a second lawsuit was filed by Rechsteiner, claiming he was injured as a result of TNA officials such as Hogan allowing Jeff Hardy to wrestle him while intoxicated. TNA's lawsuit against Rechsteiner was dismissed by a judge in February 2016.

Rechsteiner was banned from attending the 2015 WWE Hall of Fame ceremony after Hogan's wife accused him of accosting her at a San Jose airport. Hogan's wife alleged that he threatened to kill Hogan, and the couple subsequently reported the incident to police. Rechsteiner denies making the death threat.

=== Health issues ===
At a TNA house show in San Juan on June 3, 2007, Rechsteiner was kicked in the throat by his opponent Apolo. After he began coughing up blood, he was taken by ambulance to a hospital, where he was diagnosed with a torn trachea and given five hours to live. He was put in an induced coma for two days, while doctors cut through his ribs and lung to repair the tear, then began draining fluid from his lungs for the next two weeks. Unable to fly because the change in air pressure would have caused his lung to collapse, he eventually left on a cruise ship and arrived in the Mainland U.S. one week later.

On March 6, 2020, during an Impact! taping in Atlanta it was reported that Reichsteiner had collapsed backstage and had stopped breathing, requiring his heart to be shocked with a defibrillator and being rushed to the hospital. He subsequently had a heart procedure after the health scare.

== Championships and accomplishments ==
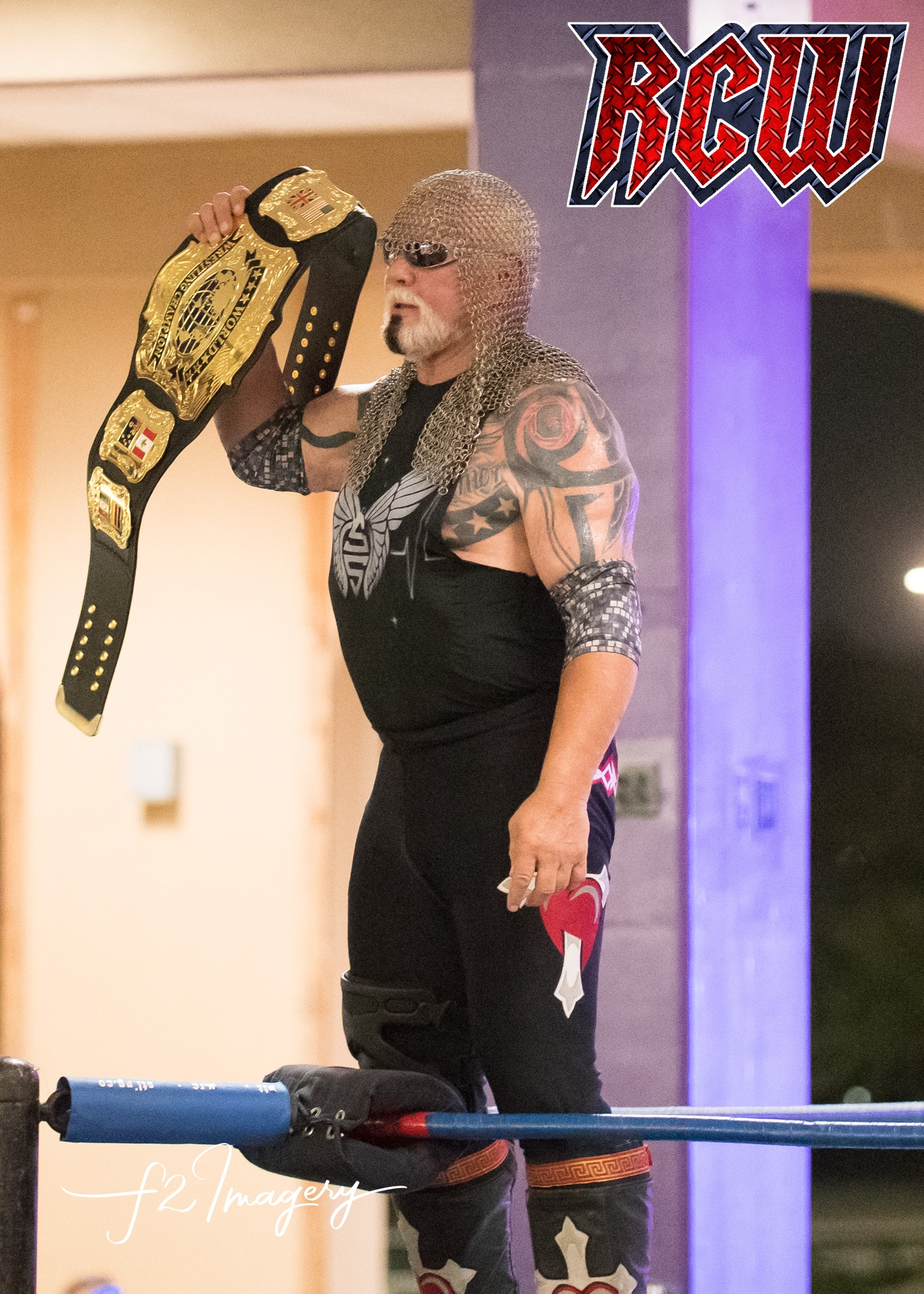
Steiner in 2018

=== Amateur wrestling ===
- National Collegiate Athletic Association
  - 1983 Division I Big 10 – Fifth place
  - 1984 Division I Big 10 – Runner-up
  - 1985 Division I Big 10 – Runner-up
  - 1986 Division I Big 10 – Runner-up
  - 1986 Division I All American – Sixth place

=== Professional wrestling ===
- Big Time Wrestling
  - BTW Heavyweight Championship (1 time)
  - Jimmy Valiant Boogie Jam Battle Royal (2022)
- Canadian Wrestling's Elite
  - CWE 123Approved.ca Television Championship (1 time)
- Canadian Wrestling International
  - CWI Heavyweight Championship (1 time)
- Continental Wrestling Association
  - CWA Tag Team Championship (3 times) – with Billy Travis (2) and Jed Grundy (1)
  - Renegade Rampage Tournament (1988)
- Dutch Pro Wrestling
  - Dutch Heavyweight Championship (1 time)
- George Tragos/Lou Thesz Professional Wrestling Hall of Fame
  - Class of 2014
- Jim Crockett Promotions / World Championship Wrestling
  - WCW World Heavyweight Championship (1 time)
  - WCW World Television Championship (2 times)
  - WCW United States Heavyweight Championship (2 times)
  - NWA/WCW United States Tag Team Championship (1 time) – with Rick Steiner
  - WCW World Tag Team Championship (7 times) – with Rick Steiner
  - Pat O'Connor Memorial Tag Team Tournament (1990) – with Rick Steiner
  - WCW United States Championship Tournament (1999)
  - WCW United States Championship Tournament (April 2000)
  - London Lethal Lottery Tag Team Tournament - with Sting
  - Eighth WCW Triple Crown Champion
- Memphis Wrestling Hall of Fame
  - Class of 2021
- Mid-Atlantic Championship Wrestling^{1}
  - MACW Hardcore Championship (3 times)
  - NWA Mid-Atlantic Heavyweight Championship (1 time)
  - NWA Mid-Atlantic Tag Team Championship (1 time) – with Rick Steiner
- New Japan Pro-Wrestling
  - IWGP Tag Team Championship (2 times) – with Rick Steiner
- Preston City Wrestling
  - PCW Tag Team Championship (1 time) – with Rick Steiner
- Pro Wrestling America
  - PWA Tag Team Championship (1 time) – with Rick Steiner
- Pro Wrestling Illustrated
  - Match of the Year (1991) with Rick Steiner vs. Lex Luger and Sting at SuperBrawl
  - Tag Team of the Year (1990, 1993) with Rick Steiner
  - Most Improved Wrestler of the Year (1989)
  - PWI ranked him No. 6 of the top 500 singles wrestlers of the year in the PWI 500 in 1991
  - PWI ranked him No. 77 of the top 500 singles wrestlers of the "PWI Years" in 2003
  - PWI ranked him No. 2 of the Top 100 Tag Teams of the "PWI Years" with Rick Steiner in 2003
- Pure Action Championship Wrestling
  - PACW Tag Team Championship (1 time) – with Rick Steiner
- Ring Ka King
  - RKK Tag Team Championship (1 time) – with Abyss
  - World Cup of Ring Ka King (2012) – with Abyss, Sir Brutus Magnus, Deadly Danda, and Sonjay Dutt
- Stars and Stripes Championship Wrestling
  - SSCW Heavyweight Championship (1 time)
- Total Nonstop Action Wrestling / Impact Wrestling
  - TNA/Impact World Tag Team Championship (2 times) – with Booker T (1) and Eli Drake (1)
  - Feast or Fired (2007 – X Division Championship contract)^{2}
  - Feast or Fired (2007 – World Heavyweight Championship contract)^{3}
- United Wrestling Federation
  - Rock 'n' Roll Express Tag Team Tournament (2007) - with Rick Steiner
- Universal Championship Wrestling
  - UCW Universal Heavyweight Championship (1 time)
- World League Wrestling
  - WLW Tag Team Championship (1 time) – with Kyle Roberts
- World Wrestling All-Stars
  - WWA World Heavyweight Championship (1 time)
- World Wrestling Association (Indianapolis)
  - WWA World Heavyweight Championship (1 time)
  - WWA World Tag Team Championship (1 time) – with Jerry Graham Jr.
- World Wrestling Council
  - WWC Universal Heavyweight Championship (1 time)
- World Wrestling Federation/WWE
  - WWF World Tag Team Championship (2 times) – with Rick Steiner
  - WWE Hall of Fame (Class of 2022) - as a member of The Steiner Brothers
- World Wide Wrestling Association
  - WWWA Heavyweight Championship (1 time)
- Wrestling Observer Newsletter
  - Best Wrestling Maneuver (1989, 1990) Frankensteiner
  - Match of the Year (1991) with Rick Steiner vs. Hiroshi Hase and Kensuke Sasaki at WCW/New Japan Supershow
  - Tag Team of the Year (1990) with Rick Steiner
  - Worst Worked Match of the Year (2003) vs. Triple H at Royal Rumble

^{1} This Mid-Atlantic promotion, while currently operating out of the same region of the United States and having revised some of the championships used by the original Mid-Atlantic promotion, is not the same promotion that was once owned by Jim Crockett Jr. and was sold to Ted Turner in 1988. It is just another NWA affiliated promotion.
^{2} Had won a match with the other Feast or Fired winners for an opportunity to trade his unopened case with someone else choosing Petey Williams' case and when his new case was opened it contained the X Division Title match. Later gave the case to back to Williams.
^{3} Defeated Petey Williams to reclaim his original briefcase
