= The Altar Boy, the Priest and the Gardener =

- Theatrical release poster
- Spanish: El monaguillo, el cura y el jardinero
- Directed by: Juan Manuel Fernández
- Written by: Juan Manuel Fernández
- Produced by: Karina Blanco; Juan Manuel Fernández
- Starring: Anthony Venegas Abarca; Josué Alvarado Quirós
- Cinematography: Juan Manuel Fernández; Laura Ángel
- Edited by: Juan Manuel Fernández; Nitay Jiménez Medhin Tewolde
- Music by: Walter Briceño
- Release dates: June 25, 2025 (CRFIC); July 17, 2025 (Costa Rica)
- Running time: 87 minutes
- Country: Costa Rica
- Language: Spanish

The Altar Boy, the Priest and the Gardener (Spanish: El monaguillo, el cura y el jardinero) is a 2025 Costa Rican documentary film written, co-produced, co-filmed, co-edited and directed by Juan Manuel Fernández. It follows the testimonies and search for justice of two men who were sexually abused as children by the priest Mauricio Víquez Lizano.

It was selected as the Costa Rican entry for the Best International Feature Film at the 98th Academy Awards, but it was not nominated.

== Synopsis ==
Two men have reported the sexual abuse they suffered during their childhood at the hands of Mauricio Víquez Lizano, a Catholic priest. This incident sparked an international investigation, marked by the priest's escape and the complainants' tireless fight for justice.

== Narrator ==
- Anthony Venegas Abarca
- Josué Alvarado Quirós

== Production ==
In 2018, director Juan Manuel Fernández became interested in the case of Anthony Venegas Abarca while watching the news in his country. The film was shot over a period of 6 years, beginning at the Presidential Palace of Costa Rica.

== Release ==
The film had its world premiere on June 25, 2025, at the 13th Costa Rica International Film Festival, and was then commercially released on July 17, 2025, in Costa Rican theaters.

== Accolades ==
| Year | Award / Festival | Category | Recipient | Result | Ref. |
|---|---|---|---|---|---|
| 2025 | 13th Costa Rica International Film Festival | Best Costa Rican Feature Film | The Altar Boy, the Priest and the Gardener | Won | |

== See also ==
- List of submissions to the 98th Academy Awards for Best International Feature Film
- List of Costa Rican submissions for the Academy Award for Best International Feature Film
