= Hilda Hidalgo =

Costa Rican film director

Hilda Hidalgo Xirinachs known as Hilda Hidalgo (Calle Blancos, Goicoechea, San José, Costa Rica, September 19, 1970) is a Costa Rican filmmaker.

== Biography ==
Hidalgo graduated as a director from the International School of Film and Television in Havana, Cuba, and has written and directed half a dozen short fiction and documentary films. Her fiction stories deal with desire, sensuality and the dreamlike.

In 2010 she made her name with her first feature film, Del amor y otros demonios, a nearly $2.5 million Costa Rican-Colombian co-production based on the novel of the same name by Gabriel García Márquez, who gave her the rights to the novel while studying film with him in Cuba in 2003. The film was screened internationally during that year: it competed in the 32nd edition of the International Festival of New Latin American Cinema in Havana, the Moscow International Film Festival - also in its 32nd edition - and in one of the most important film festivals in East Asia, the Shanghai International Film Festival.

Violeta al fin (Costa Rica-Mexico), her second feature film, starring Costa Rican leading actress Eugenia Chaverri and with the special participation of Mexican Gustavo Sánchez Parra, had its world premiere at the Busan International Film Festival and was released theatrically in Costa Rica in November 2017 and in Mexico in May 2018.

Hilda Hidalgo also directed the New School of Film and TV at Veritas University and is a professor at the School of Collective Communication Sciences at the University of Costa Rica. Currently, she works as a screenwriter, director and independent producer for her company Producciones La Tiorba, where she is developing her third feature film, entitled Niñas.

== Career ==
Her films have participated in festivals in Turkey, Cologne, Cuba, Cartagena, Rimini, Créteil, Amsterdam, San Francisco and Chicago, among others. Her short film, "La Pasión de Nuestra Señora" (1998), won the award for best short film at the "Festival de Cine Latino San Francisco-Marin", United States in 2000 and the documentary "Polvo de Estrellas" (2001) received the "Círculo precolombino de oro" for "Best art documentary" at the 2004 Bogota International Film Festival.

In 2003 she wrote Estación Violenta, his first feature film script, received the Best Plot Award at the 10+1 Muestra de Cine y Video Costarricense and won a scholarship from the Carolina Foundation and Casa de América to the first "Ibero-American Film Projects Workshop" under the tutelage of screenwriter Paz Alicia Garciadiego.

=== Feature films ===
In 2009 she released his first feature film, "Del amor y otros demonios" based on Gabriel García Márquez's 1994 novel of the same name after receiving the rights to the work from the same author in 2003. The film centers on the love story of 13-year-old Sierva María, part of the colonial aristocracy. It is set in the 18th century in Cartagena de Indias, where it was filmed. The Nobel Prize winner for Literature, García Márquez, was satisfied with the adaptation of his work.

The film participated in film festivals in Cuba, Moscow and China. It also represented Costa Rica in the 25th edition of the Goya Awards in Spain and in the 83rd edition of the Oscars in Hollywood in the category of "Best Foreign Film" nominated by the country's Film Center. She also participated in the "Los Angeles Film Festival" in California, US, the "Pusan International Film Festival" in South Korea and the "Taipei Film Festival" in Taiwan.

Her second feature film, Violeta al fin, is an intimate story about an elderly woman and the opportunities that arise in this period. For this story the director relied on her mother's photography. The project obtained, in 2013, $100 thousand from the "Fondo Ibermedia" in the category of Co-production. In 2015 it received support from FAUNO, the first state fund for film development in Costa Rica. The film stars Eugenia Chaverri, also from Costa Rica, and is shot in traditional neighborhoods in the city of San José.
