= The Sound of Things =

2016 film

- Film poster
- Directed by: Ariel Escalante
- Written by: Ariel Escalante
- Starring: Liliana Biamonte
- Distributed by: Sputnik Films
- Release date: 25 June 2016 (Moscow IFF)
- Running time: 78 minutes
- Country: Costa Rica
- Language: Spanish

The Sound of Things (Spanish: El Sonido de las Cosas) is a 2016 Costa Rican drama film directed by Ariel Escalante. It was shown at international film festivals and was selected as the Costa Rican entry for the Best Foreign Language Film at the 90th Academy Awards but was not nominated.

== Plot ==
Claudia, a young nurse, struggles after her friend, cousin, and roommate Silvia dies by suicide.

== Cast ==
- Liliana Biamonte as Claudia
- Fernando Bolaños as Santiago
- Claudia Barrionuevo as Catalina

== Production ==
The Sound of Things was Escalante's feature film debut. Escalante cited the influence of Yasujiro Ozu's Tokyo Story on his creative process and stated that Ma Yuan influenced his mise-en-scène.

== Reception ==
The film made its world premiere at the 38th Moscow International Film Festival in 2016, where it won the Kommersant Weekend Prize.

The Sound of Things was submitted for IFF Panama's inaugural Primera Mirada (First Look) prize; although it lost out to the film I Promise You Anarchy, the $25,000 prize was split so that $5,000 could be awarded to Escalante as an honorable mention. Diana Sanchez, programmer for the Toronto International Film Festival and artistic director of IFF Panama, said in advance of the award that The Sound of Things showed agility in balancing narrative and formal elements in its depiction of grief and called the film a "very promising debut." It was also shown at the 2017 Cinemaissí film festival in Helsinki.

In addition to the film's selection as Costa Rica's entry at the Academy Awards, it was Costa Rica's entry for the 32nd Goya Awards but was not nominated.

Eric Kohn, writing for IndieWire, called the film a "quiet, unassuming character study" whose "subtle attention to behavior and inexpressible feelings reflects the intelligence of a promising storyteller attuned to cinema’s unique powers." Kohn praised both Escalante's restrained narrative style and Liliana Biamonte's transformation of demeanor throughout the film. While Kohn believed the film was "more of a prolonged sketch than fully realized concept," he believed the film marked a thoughtful directorial debut from Escalante.

== See also ==
- List of submissions to the 90th Academy Awards for Best Foreign Language Film
- List of Costa Rican submissions for the Academy Award for Best Foreign Language Film
