= Caribe (2004 film) =

2004 film

- Directed by: Esteban Ramírez
- Written by: Esteban Ramírez
- Starring: Jorge Perugorría
- Release date: 5 November 2004
- Running time: 90 minutes
- Country: Costa Rica
- Language: Spanish

Caribe is a 2004 Costa Rican drama film directed by Esteban Ramírez. It was selected as the Costa Rican entry for the Best Foreign Language Film at the 78th Academy Awards, but it was not nominated.

== Cast ==
- Jorge Perugorría as Vicente Vallejo
- Cuca Escribano as Abigail
- Maya Zapata as Irene
- Roberto McLean as Jackson
- Vinicio Rojas as Ezequiel
- Thelma Darkings as Lorraine

== See also ==
- List of submissions to the 78th Academy Awards for Best Foreign Language Film
- List of Costa Rican submissions for the Academy Award for Best International Feature Film
