= A Boyfriend's Presentation =

2019 Costa Rican comedy film

- Theatrical release poster
- Directed by: Soley Bernal
- Screenplay by: Soley Bernal; Franco C Orocu
- Story by: Soley Bernal
- Produced by: Soley Bernal; Christian Aguilar H.
- Starring: Gary Centeno; Sergio Arce; Paloma Ruiz de Alda; Nicole de Saro; Lorelay Sancho; José Arceyuth
- Cinematography: Franco C. Orocu
- Edited by: Soley Bernal
- Music by: Cynthia Alvarado Abarca; Christian Solis
- Production company: Orquídea Negra Films
- Release date: August 22, 2019
- Running time: 90 minutes
- Country: Costa Rica
- Language: Spanish
- Budget: $120.000

A Boyfriend's Presentation (Spanish: Te presento a mi novio, lit. 'I present to you my boyfriend') is a 2019 Costa Rican comedy film directed, co-produced and edited by Soley Bernal from a screenplay that she co-wrote with Franco C. Orocu. It stars Gary Centeno, Sergio Arce, Paloma Ruiz de Alda, Nicole de Saro, Lorelay Sancho and José Arceyuth.

== Synopsis ==
César is an overprotective father who one day discovers that his daughter Daniela wants to introduce him to her first boyfriend, Diego. His wife Gaby wants her husband to accept the inevitable. But everything gets worse when César is surprised that his daughter's suitor is an environmentalist, vegetarian, and feminist with whom he had a confrontation in days gone by. For this reason, César will seek the help of his partner to devise a plan that will open his daughter's eyes and leave that homeless man with no future.

== Cast ==
The actors participating in this film are:

- Gary Centeno as Diego
- Sergio Arce as César
- Paloma Ruiz de Alda as Gaby
- Nicole de Saro as Daniela
- Lorelay Sancho as Barby
- Jaime Castro as Mr. Alberto
- Álvaro Marenco as Seller
- José Arceyuth

== Production ==
Principal photography began in November 2018 in San José, Heredia and Alajuela, Costa Rica.

== Release ==
A Boyfriend's Presentation was scheduled to premiere on June 27, 2019, in Costa Rican theaters, but it was delayed until August 22 of the same year.
