= El Milagro, Quintana Roo =

El Milagro
- Community
- Interactive map of El Milagro
- Coordinates: 18.6344°N 88.2672°W
- Country: Mexico
- State: Quintana Roo
- Municipality: Benito Juárez

El Milagro, Quintana Roo is one of the communities in the municipality of Benito Juarez, Quintana Roo. It is effectively a commuter suburb of Cancun.
