= Enredados, la confusión =

- Movie Poster of Hindi dubbed version
- Directed by: Prabhakar Sharan
- Produced by: Pacific Investment Corporation
- Starring: Prabhakar Sharan; Nancy Dobles; Scott Steiner; Mario Chacón
- Release date: 9 February 2018
- Country: Costa Rica
- Language: Spanish

Enredados, la confusión (lit. 'Tangled, the confusion') is a 2018 Costa Rican comedy-drama film directed by Prabhakar Sharan and produced under the banner of Pacific Investment Corporation. starring Nancy Dobles, Prabhakar Sharan, Mario Chacón, José Castro and Scott Steiner. The movie was released on 15 December 2017.

The film was dubbed in Hindi as 1 Chor 2 Mastikhor, which was released on 15 December 2017.

== Plot ==
Leo, played by Sharan, is in a deep dilemma to choose between love and money. The movie focuses on a robbery which takes a U-turn after an accident, after which Leo chooses love over money.

The narrative includes a sequence of comedic and suspenseful situations arising from Leo’s attempts to resolve the consequences of the robbery, with misunderstandings and mishaps that complicate his journey toward choosing love over material gain.

== Cast ==
- Prabhakar Sharan as Leo
- Nancy Doubles as Ana
- Mario Chacón as Chino
- José Castro as Mario
- Scott Steiner as Boss
