= Of Love and Other Demons (film) =

2009 film by Hilda Hidalgo

- Film poster
- Directed by: Hilda Hidalgo
- Screenplay by: Hilda Hidalgo
- Based on: Of Love and Other Demons by Gabriel García Márquez
- Produced by: Hilda Hidalgo
- Starring: Pablo Derqui
- Cinematography: Mariana Rodríguez
- Release dates: 9 October 2009 (PIFF); 9 April 2010 (Costa Rica)
- Running time: 103 minutes
- Countries: Costa Rica; Colombia
- Language: Spanish

Of Love and Other Demons (Spanish: Del amor y otros demonios) is a 2009 internationally co-produced drama film directed by Hilda Hidalgo, who also wrote the screenplay. The film was selected as the Costa Rican entry for the Best Foreign Language Film at the 83rd Academy Awards, but it did not make the final shortlist. The film is based on the novel of the same name by the Colombian Nobel Prize-winning author Gabriel García Márquez.

== Plot ==
The story takes place sometime during the colonial period in Colombia, in a time of extreme religious intolerance (thanks to the Holy Inquisition) and slavery.

In that dark setting, a 13-year-old Spanish aristocratic girl named Sierva Maria (Eliza Triana) wants to know what kisses taste like. She is the daughter of wealthy marquises but was raised by African slaves who were taken to Cartagena de Indias.

When a rabid dog bites her, the bishop (Jordi Dauder) believes her to be possessed and orders Cayetano Delaura (Pablo Derqui), his ecclesiastical disciple, to lock her up in the convent and exorcise her. The vicar and the girl will be seduced by a demon more powerful than faith and reason, which makes them maintain a love affair hidden from everyone, which culminates in a tragic outcome.

PLOT: The story is situated in the 18th century in the time of Colonialism in Colombia and follows the central figure of Sievra Maria, a thirteen-year-old girl from an aristocratic white family. Maria was hardly raised by her parents, but rather by the house's head slave woman Dominga de Adviento. This nanny of African descent has a Yoruban background and taught Maria about her homeland's traditions, as well as African languages. One day, while at the market with her nanny, Maria is bitten by a rabid dog. The wound on her ankle makes her feverish and ill, and her father, the Marquis, worries she may have contracted rabies. A doctor says she does not seem to have rabies, but advises to keep an eye on her as she has strange side effects. Despite efforts to keep the girl's condition a secret, the word spreads to the local bishop, who tells the Marquis to bring the girl to the convent to be overseen by nuns. Here, the girl is imprisoned, as she is believed to be possessed by a demon. A woman confined in the cell next to Maria's, who is said to be crazy as she has atheist beliefs, visits the girl in her cell by night. They talk and keep each other company. The bishop tasks a young priest named Cayetano to be “in charge of the girl’s soul”; his task is to expel the demon within her. He regularly visits the girl, and falls in love with her, quickly believing a mistake has been made and she is not possessed. He tries to tell the bishop this, but the bishop refuses to listen. A strong tension between passion and societal constraints challenges Cayetano’s faith, and his sleep is coloured by dreams of Maria. Eventually he gives in to his passions. The bishop feels disgraced by Cayetano and sends him away. Cayetano sneaks through a tunnel to visit the girl, but for some reason, never thinks to use the tunnel to escape with her. At the end, the girl's long hair, which was meant to be cut when she is married and no longer a virgin, is cut by the bishop and she undergoes an exorcism.

== Cast ==
- Pablo Derqui as Cayetano Delaura
- Eliza Triana as Sierva María
- Jordi Dauder as Obispo
- Joaquín Climent as Marqués
- Margarita Rosa de Francisco as Marquesa
- Damián Alcázar as Abrenuncio
- Alina Lozano as Abadesa
- Martha Lucía Leal as Sor Agueda
- Carlota Llano as Martina
- Linette Hernández as Caridad

== See also ==
- List of submissions to the 83rd Academy Awards for Best Foreign Language Film
- List of Costa Rican submissions for the Academy Award for Best Foreign Language Film
