= List of Costa Rican submissions for the Academy Award for Best International Feature Film =

List of Costa Rican films

Best International Feature Film submissions from Costa Rica

Highlights
- Debut: 2005
- Submissions: 15
- Nominations: none
- Oscar winners: none

Costa Rica submitted a film for the Academy Award for Best International Feature Film (Note: The category was previously named the Academy Award for Best Foreign Language Film, but this was changed to the Academy Award for Best International Feature Film in April 2019, after the Academy deemed the word "Foreign" to be outdated.) for the first time in 2005. The award is handed out annually by the United States Academy of Motion Picture Arts and Sciences to a feature-length motion picture produced outside the United States that contains primarily non-English dialogue. It was not created until the 1956 Academy Awards, in which a competitive Academy Award of Merit, known as the Best Foreign Language Film Award, was created for non-English speaking films, and has been given annually since.

As of 2026, Costa Rica has submitted fifteen films, but none of them were nominated.

== Submissions ==
The Academy of Motion Picture Arts and Sciences has invited the film industries of various countries to submit their best film for the Academy Award for Best International Feature Film since 1956. The International Feature Film Committee oversees the process and reviews all the submitted films. Following this, they vote via secret ballot to determine the five nominees for the award.

All submissions are primarily in Spanish. Below is a list of the films that have been submitted by Costa Rica for review by the Academy for the award by year and the respective Academy Awards ceremony.

Year (Ceremony)	Film title used in nomination	Original title	Director(s)	Result
2005 (78th)	Caribe		Esteban Ramírez	Not nominated
2010 (83rd)	Of Love and Other Demons	Del amor y otros demonios	Hilda Hidalgo	Not nominated
2014 (87th)	Red Princesses	Princesas rojas	Laura Astorga	Not nominated
2015 (88th)	Presos		Esteban Ramírez	Not nominated
2016 (89th)	About Us	Entonces nosotros	Hernán Jiménez	Not nominated
2017 (90th)	The Sound of Things	El sonido de las cosas	Ariel Escalante	Not nominated
2018 (91st)	Medea		Alexandra Latishev Salazar	Not nominated
2019 (92nd)	The Awakening of the Ants	El despertar de las hormigas	Antonella Sudasassi	Not nominated
2020 (93rd)	Land of Ashes	Ceniza negra	Sofía Quirós Ubeda	Not nominated
2021 (94th)	Clara Sola		Nathalie Álvarez Mesén	Not nominated
2022 (95th)	Domingo and the Mist	Domingo y la niebla	Ariel Escalante	Not nominated
2023 (96th)	I Have Electric Dreams	Tengo sueños eléctricos	Valentina Maurel	Not nominated
2024 (97th)	Memories of a Burning Body	Memorias de un cuerpo que arde	Antonella Sudasassi	Not nominated
2025 (98th)	The Altar Boy, the Priest and the Gardener	El monaguillo, el cura y el jardinero	Juan Manuel Fernández	Not nominated
2026 (99th)	If We Don't Burn, How Do We Light Up the Night	Si no ardemos, cómo iluminar la noche	Kim Torres	Pending

== See also ==
- List of Academy Award winners and nominees for Best International Feature Film
- List of Academy Award-winning foreign language films
