= Domingo and the Mist =

Domingo y la niebla
- Film poster
- Directed by: Ariel Escalante Meza
- Written by: Ariel Escalante Meza
- Produced by: Felipe Zúñiga Sánchez; Nicolás Wong; Gabriela Fonseca; Julio Hernández Cordón
- Starring: Carlos Ureña; Sylvia Sossa; Arias Vindas; Esteban Brenes Serrano
- Cinematography: Nicolas Wong
- Edited by: Lorenzo Mora Salazar
- Music by: Alberto Torres
- Production company: Incendio Cine
- Release date: 25 May 2022
- Running time: 86 minutes
- Countries: Costa Rica; Qatar
- Language: Spanish

Domingo and the Mist (Spanish: Domingo y la niebla) is a 2022 Costa Rican drama film directed by Ariel Escalante Meza. It had its international premiere on May 25, 2022, at the 75th Cannes Film Festival in competition for the Un Certain Regard, thus becoming the only Costa Rican and Central American film to compete in this section. It was selected as the Costa Rican entry for Best International Feature Film at the 95th Academy Awards.

== Synopsis ==
Domingo's house, in the mountains of Costa Rica, is about to be expropriated due to the construction of a highway. But his land hides a secret: the ghost of his deceased wife visits him through the fog. Domingo is determined: he will never give up his land, even if it means resorting to violence.

== Cast ==
- Carlos Urena as Domingo
- Sylvia Sossa as Sylvia
- Esteban Brenes Serrano as Yendrick
- Arias Vindas as Paco

== Production ==
It was shot in Cascajal, Costa Rica with the participation of 50 citizens, produced by Incendio Cine together with Bicha Cine and the Costa Rican Center for Film Production.

== See also ==
- List of submissions to the 95th Academy Awards for Best International Feature Film
- List of Costa Rican submissions for the Academy Award for Best International Feature Film
