= Paz Fábrega =

Costa Rican filmmaker (born 1979)

- Born: 1979 (age 46–47); San José, Costa Rica
- Occupations: Film director; Script writer; Producer
- Years active: 2006–present

Paz Fábrega (born 1979) is a Costa Rican film director, scriptwriter and producer. She has directed two feature films and several shorts. Her film Agua fría de mar (Cold Water of the Sea) earned the Tiger Award at the Rotterdam International Film Festival, one of the most prominent awards won by a Central American film. Her works deal with loneliness and the vulnerability of youth.

== Early life ==
Fábrega was born in San José, Costa Rica. She lived in New York City from ages 10–14 as her mother worked on her doctorate. She studied communications at the University of Costa Rica, photography at the Colegio Universitario de Alajuela, and film at the London Film School, graduating from the latter in 2006.

== Career ==
Fábrega's graduation film Temporal was shot in rural Costa Rica in 2006. It competed at several international film festivals and won the Grand Prix at the Biarritz Film Festival. Her second short, Cuilos, premiered in 2008 at the Locarno Film Festival and received four awards at the Icaro Film Festival in Guatemala.

She wrote the script for her first feature, Agua fría de mar, at residencies in the Binger Filmlab and the Sundance Screenwriters Lab. It was screened at more than 40 international film festivals and received prizes in Lima, London and Paris. It was a finalist for the Sundance NHK Award and won the Tiger Award at the Rotterdam International Film Festival. Later, Fábrega was selected for the Cannes Film Festival Residence de la Cinefondation in 2009.

Viaje, her second feature film, won the Cine en Construcción prize at the Costa Rica Film Festival in 2014 and premiered at the 2015 Tribeca Film Festival. It was the first Central American film to premiere at Tribeca. It was also selected to screen at the Karlovy Vary Film Festival.

She established her production company, Temporal Films, in 2006. The company helped produce both Viaje and Agua fría de mar.

Fábrega has cited the influences of Wim Wenders, Terrence Malick, Bob Raffelson, Lynne Ramsay, David Lynch, Michelangelo Antonioni, Lucrecia Martel, Asghar Farhadi and Richard Linklater.

== Filmography ==
- Viaje (feature film) - 2015
- Agua fría de mar (Cold Water of the Sea, feature film) - 2010
- Cuilos (short) - 2008
- Los justicieros (short) - 2006
- suicide - 2006
- The red and the black (short) - 2006
- 8 - 2006
- Temporal (short) - 2006
- Situations Vacant (short) - 2005
- Proyecto La Sala (short) - 2001
