= El Cielo Rojo =

- Directed by: Miguel Alejandro Gomez
- Written by: Miguel Alejandro Gomez
- Produced by: Miguel Alejandro Gomez; Carlos Van Vleet; Andrea Truque
- Starring: Allen Obando; Mauricio Dapena; Ricardo Rodriguez; Edgar Roman
- Cinematography: Andres Vargas; Miguel Alejandro Gomez
- Music by: Gandhi; Bufonic; Nada; La nueva P Bruno Porter; Parque en el Espacio
- Release date: March 2008
- Running time: 85 min
- Country: Costa Rica
- Language: Spanish

El Cielo Rojo is a 2008 independent film from Costa Rica. Written and directed by Miguel Alejandro Gomez, the film stars Allan Obando (Roberto), Mauricio Dapena (Berny), Ricardo Rodriguez (Manuel), and Edgar Roman (Nestor).

The film was shot in the Costa Rican provinces of San José, Puntarenas, Guanacaste, and Alajuela; It was shot in 21 days through January 2007 and was released in early August 2008. The film is a character-driven drama, with a heavy dose of comedy, and could be classified as both a coming-of-age story with political undertones and an art-house film.

== Synopsis ==
Bernie, Manuel, and Nestor just graduated from high school, and have no plans for the future. Unsatisfied with the opportunities Costa Rica presents, the boys decide to concentrate on mundane activities. However, over the course of a few days, key events in the boys' personal lives conspire to make a disinterested lifestyle difficult.

After a break-up with his girlfriend, Bernie reconsiders going to college, in hopes of repairing his relationship. In the midst of an identity crisis brought on by concerned adults, Manuel tries to survive mental confusion.

Bound by revolutionary spirit, the friends must handle their internal conflicts individually and as a group.

== Production ==
El cielo rojo was filmed in several provinces of Costa Rica: San José, Puntarenas, Guanacaste and Alajuela; filming took 21 days in January 2007 and was released in early August 2008.

== See also ==
- El Fin, a 2012 Gomez film
