= Thelma Darkings =

Costa Rican actress and television presenter

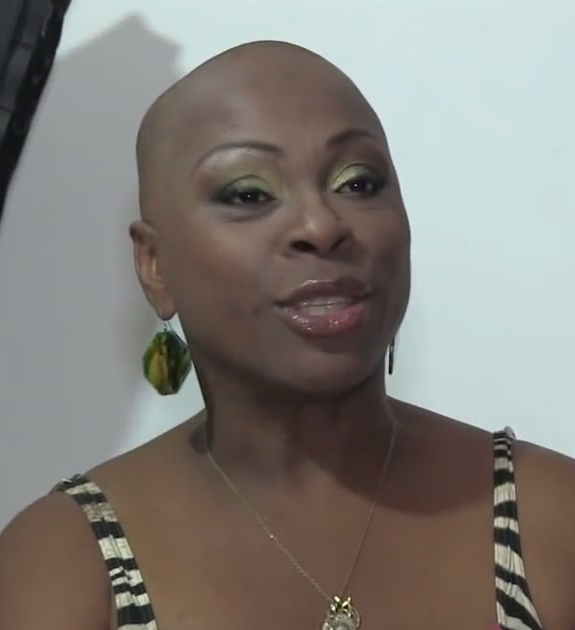
- Darkings in a 2014 interview
- Born: Thelma Darkings Bucknam; 5 November 1960 (age 65)

Thelma Darkings Bucknam (born 5 November 1960) is a Costa Rican actress and television presenter. She is known for hosting the Costa Rican talk show programs Conectados and previously Entre nos. Her film credits include Noi siamo angeli (1997), Caribe (2004), and El último comandante (2010).

== Early life and education ==
Darkings was born 5 November 1960. Darkings's mother María del Carmen Teresita Bucknam sold food, while her father, Jackie Kerr, was a boxer who hailed from Limón, Costa Rica. In an interview with journalist Freddy Serrano, Darkings stated that she had a hard childhood due to being black and being from the capital San José. Darkings studied acting at the National Theatre Workshop (Spanish: Taller Nacional de Teatro), organised by the Melico Salazar Theatre in Costa Rica. Her studies there were supported by her mother María Bucknam and mentor Mireya Barboza.

== Career ==
Darkings has acted in films and series such as Noi siamo angeli (1997), Caribe (2004), El último comandante (2010), Un regalo esencial (2018), and Todos somos Óscar (2019). In 2019, she starred in Aves, a satirical theatre production adapted from The Birds and directed by Marialaura Salom. She played the role of Orifeo, the "chief" of the birds, in the production.

Darkings has also worked as a dancer and taught as a professor of impression at the Universidad de las Ciencias y el Arte de Costa Rica ("University of the Sciences and Art of Costa Rica"). She currently hosts the talk show program Conectados on Costa Rica's Channel 33, and previously hosted Entre nos on Channel 9.

== Political aspirations ==
In 2013, Darkings announced her intent to run for the Legislative Assembly of Costa Rica in the 2014 Costa Rican general election, under the Patriotic Alliance. She later expressed her support for presidential candidate Luis Guillermo Solís of the Citizens' Action Party (PAC). Darkings has also been involved with the Costa Rica Coalition (Spanish: Coalición Costa Rica), which supported presidential candidate Carlos Alvarado Quesada of the PAC in the 2018 Costa Rican general election.

In June 2019, Darkings was announced as the National Restoration Party's candidate for vice-mayor of San José for the 2020 San José mayoral election, alongside mayoral candidate Douglas Altamirano. However, she announced her resignation as a candidate on 18 August 2019.

== Personal life ==
Darkings has two children and is a grandmother. In March 2013, she married Ángel Luis La O Hinojosa in Las Tunas, Cuba. The couple live in the Paso Ancho barrio of the San Sebastián district with Darkings's daughter.

=== Comments on racial discrimination ===
In a 2016 article for La Prensa Libre, Darkings recounted her experiences with racism in Costa Rica. She said that racial discrimination in Costa Rica is "a harsh reality," noting that discrimination in the country is not a matter of outright "forbidding entry to people who are Black or Chinese or another ethnicity," but rather that one is free to discriminate as long as they find an excuse for it.

In an article for La Nación published amidst the George Floyd protests in the United States, Darkings recalled her experiences with discrimination based on skin colour in Costa Rica. She stated that what happened to George Floyd is "a racial injustice" and that "it is painful, as a Costa Rican, to accept that Costa Rica continues to be very racist."
