= Red Princesses =

2013 Costa Rican film by Laura Astorga

- Film poster
- Spanish: Princesas rojas
- Directed by: Laura Astorga
- Written by: Laura Astorga
- Starring: Fernando Bolaños
- Release date: 11 February 2013 (Berlin)
- Running time: 90 minutes
- Country: Costa Rica
- Language: Spanish

Red Princesses (Spanish: Princesas rojas) is a 2013 Costa Rican drama film directed by Laura Astorga. It was selected as the Costa Rican entry for the Best Foreign Language Film at the 87th Academy Awards, but was not nominated. The film tells the story of the daughters of Sandinista revolutionaries who flee to neighboring Costa Rica.

== Cast ==
- Fernando Bolaños as Felipe
- María José Callejas as Floria
- Valeria Conejo as Claudia
- Aura Dinarte as Antonia
- Ivette Guier as Cora

== See also ==
- List of submissions to the 87th Academy Awards for Best Foreign Language Film
- List of Costa Rican submissions for the Academy Award for Best Foreign Language Film
