= Milagro de amor (1955 film) =

1955 zarzuela by Alcides Prado

Milagro de amor (Miracle of Love) is a 1955 Costan Rican zarzuela by the composer Alcides Prado Quesada.

Prado's zarzuela, to a libretto by his wife Carmen Carvajal de Prado, was inspired by Costa Rican folklore. It premiered at the Teatro Nacional and was such a success that a 16mm filmed version was made under the direction of the impresario José Gamboa. Gamboa's 16mm film was one of only three fictional films made in Costa Rica between 1955 and 1970.
