= La apuesta =

1968 Costa Rican film

La apuesta (The Bet) is a 1968 Costa Rican film directed by Miguel Salaguero. It was one of only three fictional films made in Costa Rica between 1955 and 1970. The film was shot in 16mm and follows the dramatized story of a group of people who set out in Toyota Land Cruisers on what was then a long journey from San José, Costa Rica, to Limón on the east coast. The film was shot before the construction of Route 32, so the travelers pass along the old southern route through Turrialba, the railway line and the now abandoned via Carrillo.

== Plot ==
The film begins with shots of various Costa Rican landscapes, while the national folk song "Guaria morada" plays in the background. Humble peasants rush to help an old Land Rover car that has gone off the road. A voiceover starts narrating the story: in San Antonio de Escazú, the beautiful Anita (Aracelli Solís) calmly collects green beans in her father's field. Antonio Solís "Pachingo" (Antonio Solís), Anita's suitor, and his cousin, a boy nicknamed Tiznao, watch the bucolic scene. Pachingo orders Tiznao to leave, wanting to "speak of love" with Anita, but the boy comes back shortly after. Then, Don Carlos (Carlos Castro) appears, Pachingo's dreaded father-in-law, an "old-fashioned" man who doesn't allow any advances towards his daughters. Don Carlos ends up chasing Pachingo through the bean field, machete in hand, but Pachingo manages to escape by jumping over the fence.

The following Sunday, Don Abel Mena (Juan de Dios Gutiérrez) is reading the newspaper when Don Ananías Camacho (Antonio Gutiérrez), Pachingo's uncle, Doña María (Elisa Salazar), the boy's grandmother, and other family members arrive. Don Abel tells Don Ananías that a self-loading vehicle has managed to reach Limón, on the Costa Rican Caribbean. The two friends start discussing their respective rural vehicles (jeeps), arguing that they could make the journey with those cars, and end up making a bet to see which of the two gets to Limón first.

Life in the small town of Escazú goes on peacefully as the day of departure approaches. One day, while Don Ananías is fixing a cart, Tiznao comes running, announcing that Don Carlos wants to forcibly marry Pachingo to Anita. Don Ananías goes to the San Antonio Church and manages to prevent the marriage, convincing the priest that Pachingo is still a minor and, moreover, doesn't have the family's approval.

On the day of the adventure, each of the bettors prepares their vehicles. Don Ananías is accompanied by Casimiro (Juan Vicente Mora), who acts as the driver since Don Ananías doesn't know how to drive, and his nephew Pachingo. Don Abel is accompanied by Don Venero Solís and Gonzalo Gamboa, a humble peasant nicknamed Torcuato the Poet. The whole town is ready to bid farewell to the adventurers, amid cheers, flags, and "cimarrona" music. The two peasants line up their cars on the street in front of the Church, and after the starting whistle, Don Ananías' jeep takes off at full speed. In contrast, Don Abel's car doesn't start and has to be pushed to begin the journey. In this way, both vehicles reach a still small-town San José with few cars. The adventurers can admire some of the most representative buildings of the Costa Rican capital, such as the National Theater of Costa Rica, the Melico Salazar Theater, La Merced Church, and the Metropolitan Cathedral.

== Production ==
The Bet is a film project that arises from a first trip made by Miguel Salguero to Limón, in the company of Antonio Solís (Pachingo) and Juan Vicente Mora (Casimiro), in 1966, in conditions very similar to those described. in the film. At this time, Miguel Zúñiga Díaz (real name of Miguel Salguero), writer, journalist and folklorist, had a traditional television program that was broadcast on Channel 6, called La hora de Tiquicia, in which, among others, Antonio participated. Gutiérrez, Costa Rican actor recognized for his character "Olegario Mena", Venero Solís and his daughters, Wilber Delgado "Naín", Ildefonso Solís, the folk singer Lorenzo "Lencho" Salazar and his mother, Elisa Morales de Salazar, Antonio Solís "Pachingo" and Juan Vicente Mora "Casimiro".

The idea of making the trip arose after a group of people from San José sent an invitation to the newspaper La Nación to make an expedition by land to Limón, until then the only capital of the provinces of Costa Rica that was not united with San José by road. To get there, there was only the railway to the Atlantic, apart from going on foot or by plane. Salguero's intention was to be part of the group, but he could not agree and they traveled on their own, using a strange vehicle called an automula (as narrated in the film), especially for bad roads. Salguero, for his part, decided to make the trip at his expense, using a model 42 Army jeep, which he owned. Accompanied by Pachingo and Casimiro, he undertook the trip on Holy Wednesday of 1966, arriving first in Siquirres, and after ten days of travel, in Limón.
