= Presos =

2015 film

- Film poster
- Directed by: Esteban Ramírez
- Written by: Esteban Ramírez
- Starring: Alejandro Aguilar
- Release date: 14 May 2015
- Running time: 97 minutes
- Country: Costa Rica
- Language: Spanish

Presos (Inmate) is a 2015 Costa Rican drama film directed by Esteban Ramirez. The film was selected as the Costa Rican entry for the Best Foreign Language Film at the 88th Academy Awards, but it was not nominated.

== Plot ==
Presos is a drama film about a young woman whose safe existence unravels when she secretly befriends a prison inmate.

== Cast ==
- Alejandro Aguilar as J.J.
- Natalia Arias as Victoria
- Rocío Carranza as Iris
- Leynar Gomez as Jason
- Daniel Marin as Emanuel
- Edgar Roman as Sebas
- Freddy Viquez as «Tanque»

== Production ==
The film was shot in Guadalupe, San José and Costa Rica and produced by Amaya Izquierdo. It was director Ramírez's third film and inspired by the 1973 documentary Los Presos, done by Ramirez's father.

== See also ==
- List of submissions to the 88th Academy Awards for Best Foreign Language Film
- List of Costa Rican submissions for the Academy Award for Best Foreign Language Film
