= Viaje (film) =

- Film poster
- Directed by: Paz Fábrega
- Written by: Paz Fábrega
- Release date: April 16, 2015 (Tribeca Film Festival)
- Country: Costa Rica
- Language: Spanish

Viaje is a 2015 Costa Rican romance film directed and written by Paz Fábrega. It had its world premiere at the 2015 Tribeca Film Festival, where it met with positive reviews. The film is shot in black-and-white.
