= Maikol Yordan de Viaje Perdido =

- Directed by: Miguel Alejandro Gomez
- Written by: Erik Hernández Gabarain; Daniel Moreno; Édgar Murillo
- Starring: Mario Chacón; Daniel Moreno; Erik Hernández Gabarain; Édgar Murillo; Boris Alonso
- Cinematography: Luis Salas; Marlon Villar
- Edited by: Juan Alberto Díaz; Daniel Moreno
- Music by: Erik Hernández Gabarain
- Production company: Audiovisuales LMD
- Release date: 18 December 2014 (Costa Rica)
- Running time: 101 minutes
- Country: Costa Rica
- Language: Spanish

Maikol Yordan Traveling Lost (Spanish: Maikol Yordan de Viaje Perdido), also known as LaBrea BritoFrito Pelicula, is a 2014 Costa Rican comedy film directed by Miguel Alejandro Gómez. It was produced by the quartet of comedians La Media Docena (The Half Dozen). The film stars Mario Chacon, Daniel Moreno, Erick Hernandez, Edgar Murillo, Natalia Monge and Adal Ramones. It was filmed on locations in Costa Rica, Mexico, England, Italy and France. Maikol Yordan Traveling Lost tells the story of Maikol Yordan Soto Sibaja, a naive and good-natured Costa Rican farmer and his adventures traveling in Europe as he tries to prevent an evil businessman from taking over his family's farm. The film became the most watched Costa Rican film in history.

== Plot ==
Maikol Yordan Soto Sibaja (Mario Chacón) is a humble farmer who migrates to the city in search of employment. After being unsuccessful, he returns to his home in the countryside where he reunites with his family: his wife Concepción (Natalia Monge) and their eight children, his grandmother Doña Milagro (Anabel Ulloa) and his cousin Heriberto (Boris Alonso). Once there, he learns that the property where he lives is about to be seized for accumulated debts and that there is a businessman named Malavassi (Adal Ramones) who is interested in acquiring the property. Maikol Yordan wins a contest to go to Europe with all his expenses paid and decides to go in order to find a job and ask for financial help from a distant cousin.

Once in Europe, Maikol Yordan is pursued by Cordero (Daniel Moreno), Malavassi's right-hand man, who seeks to thwart Maikol Yordan's plans on several occasions. On his journey through Europe, Maikol Yordan makes several friends who help him meet his cousin: Carolina (María José León), a Colombian waitress who works in a pub in London and is an aspiring model; François (Erik Hernández), a French rogue; and Greivin (Édgar Murillo), a Costa Rican photographer who works in Paris and goes by the name of Jean Luc.
