= Mónica Ayos =

Argentine actress

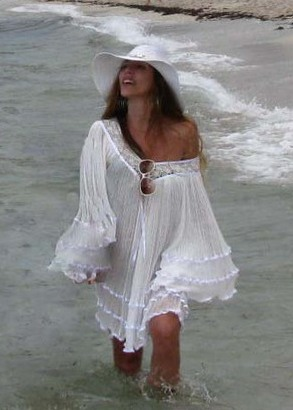
- Born: Buenos Aires, Argentina
- Occupation: Actress
- Spouse: Diego Olivera (m. 2002)
- Children: 2, including Federico Ayos

Mónica Ayos is an Argentine actress.

== Biography ==
Mónica Ayos Crámer was born in Buenos Aires. She is the daughter of the dancers Víctor Ayos and Mónica Crámer. As her parents frequently left the country on dance tours, she lived with her grandmother in Mar del Plata, and attended the local elementary school. She returned to Buenos Aires, and attended high school in San Telmo. She had small assignments as an actress at the age of 12. She was emancipated at the age of 16, and visited Chile. She had a son with a Chilean that she broke up with a few months later, and raised her son as a single mother.

After several castings, she got minor roles in the TV comedies La Familia Benvenuto, Mi cuñado and Naranja y Media. Working in Canal 9 at midnight, she became a notable dancer and singer, and worked with Nito Artaza, Miguel Ángel Cherutti, Tristán and Jorge Corona. She soon left the program and worked as an actress instead. She married the actor Diego Olivera in 2002, and had a daughter with him.

Her first main works in television were in Telefe. She worked in Franco Buenaventura, el profe in 2001. She was nominated to the Martín Fierro Award as best actress for her work. Producer Sebastián Borestein gave her the chance to work in Tiempo Final. In 2006, she moved to El Trece and worked in the comedy Sos mi vida; the telenovela starred Natalia Oreiro and Facundo Arana and was aired in several countries. She was nominated again for the Martín Fierro Award as best actress. She also worked in the drama Mujeres Asesinas and the comedy Por amor a vos, also produced by Pol-Ka.

Diego Olivera was working in Mexico, in the telenovela Triunfo del Amor aired by Televisa, and Ayos visited him during a vacation. The producer Salvador Mejía proposed her to work in the telenovela as well, playing a villain. Ayos declined other proposals she had in Buenos Aires, and joined the cast of the Mexican telenovela. In 2014, Ayos appeared in the drama Mexican series Como dice el dicho where she played Norma Iturbide. The following year, she portrayed Valeria Mondragón in the telenovela Antes muerta que Lichita produced by Rosy Ocampo for Televisa. In 2016 she starred in Las Amazonas portraying the twin sisters, Diana María and Diana Elisa Santos, one of them being the mother of the female protagonists.

== Works ==
=== Television ===
- Chabonas (2000)
- Un cortado, historias de café (2002)
- Franco Buenaventura, el profe (2002)
- Tiempofinal (2002)
- Costumbres argentinas (2003)
- De pé a pá (2003)
- Panadería los Felipe (2003–2004)
- De la cama al living (2004)
- Amor en custodia (2004)
- Historias de sexo de gente común (2005)
- Pecados capitales (2005)
- Sos mi vida (2006)
- Mujeres asesinas (2007)
- Por amor a vos (2008)
- Botineras (2009)
- Herencia de amor (2010)
- Triunfo del amor (2011)
- Volver al ruedo (2011)
- La pelu (2012)
- El sustituto (2012)
- Dulce amor (2012)
- Como dice el dicho (2014)
- Antes muerta que Lichita (2015)
- Las amazonas (2016)
- Puerta 7 (2020)
- Maradona, sueño bendito (2021)
- La desalmada (2021)

=== Film ===
- Tres de corazones (2007)
- Francia (2010)
- La campana (2010)
- Madraza (2017)
- En brazos de un asesino (2019)
- Juntos pero no revueltos (2023)

=== Theater ===
- Nación Imposible (1996)
- Ricos y Fogosos (1997)
- Gansoleros (1999)
- Divertidísimo (2000)
- Corona 2003 (2000)
- Movete Chupete Movete (2001)
- El Gran Bar de tu Hermana (2001)
- Reíte País (2001)
- Casi un ángel (2002–2003)
- Taxi 1 (2004–2006)
- Doña Flor y sus dos maridos (2006–2007)
- Eva y Victoria (2007)
- Pichincha al 400 (2007)
- En la cama (2008–2009)
- Super Tango (2013)
- Plan B (2014)
- Atracción Fatal (2014–2015)
