= Triunfo del amor =

- Genre: Telenovela
- Created by: Delia Fiallo
- Based on: Cristal by Delia Fiallo
- Written by: Liliana Abud; Ricardo Fiallega
- Directed by: Jorge Édgar Ramirez; Alberto Díaz
- Starring: Victoria Ruffo; Maite Perroni; William Levy; Diego Olivera; Guillermo García Cantú; Erika Buenfil; Eduardo Santamarina; Alicia Rodriguez; Osvaldo Ríos; Daniela Romo
- Theme music composer: Osvaldo Farres
- Opening theme: "Tres palabras" by Luis Miguel
- Ending theme: "A partir de hoy" by Maite Perroni and Marco Di Mauro
- Country of origin: Mexico
- Original language: Spanish
- No. of episodes: 176

Production
- Executive producer: Salvador Mejía Alejandre
- Producer: Bosco Primo De Rivera
- Cinematography: Bernardo Najera; Jorge Amaya Rodríguez
- Editors: Alfredo Frutos; Pablo Peralta Monroy
- Running time: 42-45 minutes
- Production company: Televisa

Original release
- Network: Canal de las Estrellas
- Release: October 25, 2010 – June 24, 2011

Related
- El privilegio de amar (1998); Los hilos del pasado (2025)

Triunfo del amor (English title: Triumph of Love) is a Mexican telenovela produced by Salvador Mejía Alejandre for Televisa. It is a remake of the 1998 telenovela El privilegio de amar, which itself is a remake of the 1985 Venezuelan novela Cristal.

The main protagonists are Victoria Ruffo, Maite Perroni and William Levy. While Daniela Romo, Guillermo García Cantú, Dominika Paleta, and Salvador Pineda are the main antagonists. With Diego Olivera, César Évora, Erika Buenfil, Pablo Montero, Mónica Ayos and Osvaldo Ríos also starring.

== Broadcast ==
Canal de las Estrellas broadcast Triunfo del Amor on October 25, 2010, airing half-hour episodes with Soy tu dueña until November 5, 2010. From November 8, 2010, to June 24, 2011, one-hour episodes were broadcast.

Univision started broadcasting Triunfo del amor in the United States on January 3, 2011, weeknights at 9pm/8c replacing Soy tu dueña. During its run, Univision aired 2 hours of the telenovela from March 4 to March 29, 2011, and from May 16 to June 3, 2011, at 9pm central, due La reina del sur dominating the 10pm time.

== Plot ==
Victoria Gutierrez (Victoria Ruffo) is introduced as a young servant working in the Iturbide's household. Juan Pablo Iturbide Montejo (Diego Olivera), the future priest, son of Octavio (Eduardo Santamarina) and Bernarda (Daniela Romo) is attracted to Victoria, the attraction is mutual.

In a night, Victoria becomes pregnant with Juan Pablo's child. Bernarda is furious upon discovering Victoria's pregnancy and kicks her out of the house. Victoria finds support from her friend, Antonieta Orozco (Erika Buenfil) and together they find work in a Rodolfo Padilla's sewing company, owned by Rodolfo Padilla (Salvador Pineda) the father of Federico (Fernanda's ex-boyfriend) (Manuel Garcia Muela). Victoria gives birth to a little girl and names her Maria.

Although they are poor, Victoria is nonetheless happy, but her happiness is soon interrupted. Bernarda intent on revenge, convinces herself that God has chosen her to enact his punishment on Victoria. She attempts to kill Victoria and her daughter, but instead only succeeds in separating them.

Years later, Victoria eventually succeeds in establishing a major fashion empire alongside her friend Antonieta. Victoria is happily married to Osvaldo Sandoval (Osvaldo Ríos) a popular actor, who has two children, "Max" (William Levy) and Fernanda "Fer" (Livia Brito). Victoria seems happy with the life that she leads, but secretly suffers and tormented by the absence of her missing daughter, Maria.

Meanwhile, Maria Desamparada Iturbide Gutierrez "Maria Forsaken" (Maité Perroni) is now a young woman who is ready to leave the orphanage where she grew up. On her way she befriends and moves in with Linda Sorting (Dorismar) and Nati Duval (Susana Diazayas). Maria's aspirations to be a great model lead her to the most famous designer of the moment, Victoria. But far from being a friendly boss, Victoria treats her with contempt and arrogance, especially since Maria is compared to a younger version of Victoria. Maria does not let Victoria's negative attitude affect her work, and it is in the workplace where she meets Max. Max and Maria fall in love and they have passionate sex, but their love is rejected by Victoria, and she plots with Max's ex-girlfriend and fashion model Jimena de Alba (Dominika Paleta) to separate the two. Together they hatch a plot in which Max mistakenly ends up believing that he impregnated Jimena with his child, and is forced to marry her.

Meanwhile, Maria is really pregnant with Max's child, but keeps her pregnancy a secret. She sacrifices her love and happiness so that Max can fulfill his mother's wishes to marry Jimena. She seeks solace from Juan Pablo, who is now a respected priest, and, unknown to her, is also her real father. Her identity is revealed to him in a secret confession from his mother Bernarda; he is therefore unable to reveal himself, as he is bound by the laws of confession. Padilla and El Alacran (Sergio Acosta) burn Maria's neighborhood's home and now they have to move. Bernarda owns the place where they live now. Maria also finds support in Jimena's renown photographer Alonso del Angel (Mark Tacher). He helps Maria through her pregnancy, and eventually aids her return to the modeling world. He falls in love with Maria, though Maria cannot reciprocate his love as she continues to love Max. Victoria deals with her hidden past by focusing on her fashion label; her husband feels increasingly isolated from her and consoles himself with another woman, Maria's friend and roommate, Linda. However, Osvaldo also hides secrets from his past; while everyone believes Max's biological mother Leonela Montenegro (Mónica Ayos) is dead, she is, in fact, alive, and in jail. Osvaldo is hated by his supposed "friend" Guillermo Quintana (Guillermo García Cantú), out of jealousy for both the relationship he once had with Leonela, and for Osvaldo's fame and fortune. He sets out on a path to destroy Osvaldo and his family, and begins by impregnating Jimena, and goes along with the plot to pass the child as Max's.

Max eventually finds out that Jimena's child isn't really his, but Guillermo's, which destroys his marriage. Max ends up maintaining custody of the child since he deems Jimena unfit to take care of him. He also learns that Maria is pregnant with his real son, and they are reunited. Jimena unites with Bernarda to destroy Sandoval's family; Bernarda buys full control of Victoria's failing fashion label and enlists Jimena as her star model. Osvaldo is shot by his ex-wife Leonela, but he survives. Victoria's happiness continues to disintegrate as she discovers her husband's infidelity, the fact that his first wife Leonela is still alive, and that she has breast cancer. Bernarda, also abducts Maria's son, which also hurts Victoria as he is her grandchild; mother and daughter bond over this mutual pain, though not understanding why the bond is so deep. El Alacran was killed by Bernarda and then Rodolfo was killed in a shootout by the police officers.

Eventually, Victoria discovers the truth regarding her daughter's identity, and is troubled to learn that the girl she had worked so hard to destroy is in fact her daughter.

Meanwhile, Bernarda plans to get rid of Maria and sets her abduction. Victoria runs to her aid but it falls on a lure and also pitched for it with Maria is kidnapped in an abandoned warehouse. Max and Osvaldo, with Alonso, Fernanda and father anxiously awaiting Juan Pablo at the home of Victoria's call demanding the ransom the kidnappers of the two. Victoria is suffering by believing the illusion that one shot killed her daughter. The kidnappers are captured by federal agents after attempting to set a trap and collect the ransom money, while Victoria is released in a wasteland on the outskirts of Mexico City. Victoria discovers the deception and runs to rescue her daughter Maria, still sequestered in the abandoned warehouse.

After the kidnapping, Alonso proposes marriage to Maria and she accepts. But Alonso is made aware by Jimena that he is infected by a virus that is destroying him and can cause death at any time.

Therefore, Alonso rejects Maria and abandons her at the altar of the Church. Guillermo and Osvaldo are hired by Televisa for a production and during the filming of, Guillermo "drops" Osvaldo, who falls from a hill to end up in a river but he survives. The producer watches the tape can not believe the incident and dismisses Guillermo from filming with the promise that he will never get a contract for any other production. Alonso dies from the virus and Maria receives a video recording of Alonso where this tells Maria that if she was happy at his side, to not be mortified by his death.

Casa Victoria and Casa Bernarda face in a fashion contest. The winner of the night turns out to be Casa Victoria, with Maria as the flagship model of the moment. But the happiness of Victoria last only a moment, when Maria's nose begins to bleed and she loses consciousness. Maria is taken to hospital, where Dr. Heriberto Rios Bernal (César Évora) tells Victoria that Maria has Phase 1 disease and acquired the same virus that killed Alonso and must remain isolated to prevent future infections. Victoria goes mad with grief and Bernarda took the opportunity to take Juan Pablito's home, where she plans to make him a priest when he grows up, to make up for the sins she has made in the past. Max refuses to stay away from Maria removes the cloth insulation. He lays next to Maria, he acquires the virus, bleeds from his nose as Maria did, passes out.

Meanwhile, Bernarda is arrested by federal authorities when evidence that she was the mastermind of the kidnapping of the son of Maria. Leonela learns the location of Max and goes to hospital, where he communicates Leonela, Heriberto, Victoria and Max is in Phase 2 of the disease and his situation is more delicate then of Maria. Max survives the virus and Victoria helps her daughter Maria get over the virus. Milagros (Carmen Salinas) and Don Napo (Manuel 'Flaco' Ibáñez) marry with friends and family. Cruz (Pablo Montero) and Fer decide to adopt.

Then, Bernarda is poisoned by drinking poisoned wine. Bernarda is then trapped in a car which is caught on fire; she breaks the window and gets out of her car, kills Eva, then proceeds to run from the law. Bernarda goes on a plane and dies in a plane crash. Roxana, Jimena's mother (Úrsula Prats) was arrested by cops at Sandoval's house. Guillermo was stabbed by Jimena, but survives. Osvaldo receives a call from his friend, and moves to Spain. Leonela crashed by Jimena with a broken glass, but survives. Jimena arrives at Max and Maria's wedding, attempting to kill Maria, but fails and runs to Guillermo's house. Guillermo and Jimena commit suicide driving their car off a cliff.

Maria and Max are happily in love with their two kids Juan Pablito and Osvaldito. Victoria is happy with her boyfriend Heriberto and her family. Fer is happy with her husband Cruz and adopted daughter Victoria Robles Sandoval. Leonola is happy with her two grandkids, her son and daughter in law Maria.

== Cast ==
=== Main ===
- Victoria Ruffo as Victoria Gutiérrez de Sandoval
- Maite Perroni as María Desamparada / María Iturbide Gutiérrez de Sandoval
- William Levy as Maximiliano "Max" Sandoval Montenegro
- Diego Olivera as Padre Juan Pablo Iturbide Montejo
- César Évora as Heriberto Ríos Bernal
- Guillermo García Cantú as Guillermo Quintana
- Erika Buenfil as Antonieta Orozco
- Dominika Paleta as Ximena De Alba
- Pablo Montero as Cruz Robles Martínez
- Mónica Ayos as Leonela Montenegro
- Mark Tacher as Alonso del Ángel
- Osvaldo Ríos as Osvaldo Sandoval
- Daniela Romo as Doña Bernarda Montejo Vda. de Iturbide
- Salvador Pineda as Rodolfo Padilla
- Pilar Pellicer as Eva Grez
- Manuel "Flaco" Ibáñez as Don Napo

=== Recurring ===
- Maricruz Nájera as Tomasa Hernández
- Marco Méndez as Fabián Duarte
- Mimi Morales as Lucy
- Dorismar as Linda Sortini
- Susana Diazayas as Nati Duval
- Ricardo Kleinbaum as Óscar
- Radamés de Jesús as Domingo
- Livia Brito as Fernanda "Fer" Sandoval Gutiérrez
- Gaby Mellado as Gaby
- Mauricio García Muela as Federico Padilla
- Andrea García as Ofelia García
- Archie Lafranco as Pedro
- Arturo Carmona as Gonzalo Candela
- Miguel Pizarro as Pipino Pichoni
- Cuauhtémoc Blanco as Juan José "Juanjo" Martínez Robles
- Carmen Salinas as Milagros Robles Vda. de Martinez
- Juan Carlos Franzoni as Fausto Candela
- Thelma Dorantes as Sor Rocío Valladolid
- Mariana Ríos as María Magdalena
- Sergio Acosta as El Alacrán
- Úrsula Prats as Roxana vda. de De Alba
- Vilma Traca as Doña Trini
- Julio Vega as Don Joel
- Rosita Bouchot as Doña Polly
- Roberto D'Amico as Cardenal
- Vicente Fernández Jr. as Chente

=== Special participation ===
- Eduardo Santamarina as Don Octavio Iturbide
- Alicia Rodríguez as Sor Clementina
- Esmeralda Pimentel as Kenia Dulce
- Gustavo Rojo as Padre Jerónimo
- Helena Rojo as Herself
- Lidice Pousa as Diana

== Awards and nominations ==
Year	Award	Category	Recipient	Result
2012	30th TVyNovelas Awards	Best Telenovela of the Year	Salvador Mejía	Nominated
2012	30th TVyNovelas Awards	Best Actress	Maite Perroni	Nominated
2012	30th TVyNovelas Awards	Best Antagonist Actress	Daniela Romo	Won
2012	30th TVyNovelas Awards	Best Co-star Actor	Mark Tacher	Nominated
2012	30th TVyNovelas Awards	Best Leading Actress	Carmen Salinas	Nominated
2012	30th TVyNovelas Awards	Best Leading Actor	César Évora	Won
2012	30th TVyNovelas Awards	Best Young Lead Actress	Livia Brito	Won
2012	30th TVyNovelas Awards	Best Original Story or Adaptation	Liliana Abud and Ricardo Fiallega	Nominated
2012	30th TVyNovelas Awards	Best Musical Theme	"A partir de hoy" by Maite Perroni and Marco Di Mauro	Nominated
