= Ozark (TV series) =

American crime drama television series (2017–2022)

- Genre: Crime drama; Serial drama
- Created by: Bill Dubuque; Mark Williams
- Showrunner: Chris Mundy
- Starring: Jason Bateman; Laura Linney; Sofia Hublitz; Skylar Gaertner; Julia Garner; Jordana Spiro; Jason Butler Harner; Esai Morales; Peter Mullan; Lisa Emery; Charlie Tahan; Janet McTeer; Tom Pelphrey; Jessica Frances Dukes; Felix Solis; Damian Young; Alfonso Herrera; Adam Rothenberg
- Music by: Danny Bensi; Saunder Jurriaans
- Country of origin: United States
- Original language: English
- No. of seasons: 4
- No. of episodes: 44

Production
- Executive producers: Jason Bateman; Chris Mundy; Bill Dubuque; Mark Williams; David Manson; Patrick Markey; John Shiban
- Producers: Patrick Markey; Matthew Spiegel; Erin Mitchell; Martín Zimmerman; Peter Thorell; Dana Scott; Paul Kolsby; Laura Deeley
- Production locations: Georgia, United States
- Cinematography: Pepe Avila del Pino; Ben Kutchins; Michael Grady; Armando Salas; Manuel Billeter; Shawn Kim; Attila Szalay; Eric Koretz
- Editors: Cindy Mollo; Vikash Patel; Heather Goodwin Floyd; Elliot Eisman
- Camera setup: Single-camera
- Running time: 51–80 minutes
- Production companies: MRC Television; Aggregate Films; Zero Gravity Management; Headhunter Films; Man, Woman & Child Productions

Original release
- Network: Netflix
- Release: July 21, 2017 – April 29, 2022

Ozark is an American crime drama television series created by Bill Dubuque and Mark Williams for Netflix and produced by MRC Television and Aggregate Films. The series stars Jason Bateman and Laura Linney as Marty and Wendy Byrde, a married couple who moves their family to the Lake of the Ozarks to continue their work laundering money for a Mexican drug cartel. Bateman also serves as a director and executive producer for the series.

The first season of Ozark was released on July 21, 2017; the second season was released on August 31, 2018; and the third season was released on March 27, 2020. The first three seasons are 10 episodes each. In June 2020, the series was renewed for a fourth and final season consisting of 14 episodes split into two parts; the first part was released on January 21, 2022, and the second was released on April 29, 2022.

Ozark received positive reviews from critics throughout its run, with particular praise for its tone, directing, production values, and performances (particularly those of Bateman, Linney, and Julia Garner). The series has received a total of 45 Primetime Emmy Award nominations, including three for Outstanding Drama Series, with Bateman winning for Outstanding Directing for a Drama Series in 2019 and Garner winning three times for Outstanding Supporting Actress in a Drama Series, in 2019, 2020, and 2022. Bateman has received two further Golden Globe Award nominations for Best Actor – Television Series Drama.

== Premise ==
After a money laundering scheme for a Mexican drug cartel goes wrong, financial advisor Marty Byrde proposes to make amends by offering to set up a bigger laundering operation in the Lake of the Ozarks region of central Missouri. Marty suddenly moves his family from the Chicago suburb of Naperville to the remote summer resort community of Osage Beach, Missouri. When the Byrdes arrive in Missouri, they become entangled with local criminals, including the Langmore and Snell families, and later the Kansas City mafia.

== Cast and characters ==
- Jason Bateman as Marty Byrde, a self-employed financial advisor originally based in Chicago who later moves his family to the Lake of the Ozarks region. In 2007, he and his business partner began to launder money for a Mexican drug cartel.
- Laura Linney as Wendy Byrde (née Davis), Marty's wife and a public relations operative for political campaigns. She becomes an advance person and stager for a local realtor, and then a lobbyist for Marty's proposal to build a casino.
- Sofia Hublitz as Charlotte Byrde, Marty and Wendy's daughter.
- Skylar Gaertner as Jonah Byrde, Marty and Wendy's adolescent son.
- Julia Garner as Ruth Langmore, a young woman who is part of a local family of petty criminals.
- Jordana Spiro as Rachel Garrison (seasons 1–2; recurring season 4), owner of the Blue Cat lodge and bar and Marty's reluctant business partner; later, Ruth's business partner.
- Jason Butler Harner as Roy Petty (seasons 1–2), an FBI agent investigating Marty.
- Esai Morales as Camino "Del" Del Rio (season 1), a lieutenant for the Navarro drug cartel.
- Peter Mullan as Jacob Snell (seasons 1–2), an established local heroin producer and the area's crime boss.
- Lisa Emery as Darlene Snell, Jacob's wife and partner in the heroin business.
- Charlie Tahan as Wyatt Langmore (seasons 2–4; recurring season 1), Russ's elder son and Ruth's cousin.
- Janet McTeer as Helen Pierce (season 3; recurring season 2), a Chicago-based attorney who represents the Navarro cartel.
- Tom Pelphrey as Ben Davis (season 3; guest season 4), Wendy's brother who has bipolar disorder.
- Jessica Frances Dukes as Maya Miller (seasons 3–4), an FBI forensic accountant investigating the Byrdes' casino business.
- Felix Solis as Omar Navarro (season 4; recurring season 3), the leader of the drug cartel for whom the Byrdes are laundering money
- Damian Young as Jim Rattelsdorf (season 4; recurring seasons 2–3), a wealthy lawyer and Wilkes' right-hand man who becomes an ally of the Byrdes.
- Alfonso Herrera as Javier "Javi" Elizondro (season 4), Navarro's hot-headed nephew and presumptive heir of his cartel.
- Adam Rothenberg as Mel Sattem (season 4), a disgraced former cop turned private investigator.

== Production ==
=== Development ===
Ozark is set at a modest waterfront resort at Lake of the Ozarks, inspired by the Alhonna Resort and Marina, where series creator Dubuque worked as a dock hand while attending college in Missouri during the 1980s. Jason Bateman was originally meant to be the sole director for the first season, but because the schedule did not enable him to have enough preparation time, he directed only the first two and last two episodes.

To make Ozark as realistic and sensible as possible for depicting money laundering, the writers for the series brought an FBI agent who works on financial crimes into the writers' room. They also brought in a hedge-fund manager, for information about moving large sums of money. Beam Solutions, a financial-compliance software company, considered the series' accuracy to be "both plausible and very creative."

The series was renewed for a 10-episode second season on August 15, 2017. On October 10, 2018, the series was renewed for a 10-episode third season. On June 30, 2020, Netflix renewed the series for its fourth and final season, which consists of 14 episodes split into two parts. The first part of the fourth and final season was released on January 21, 2022. The second part of the final season premiered on April 29, 2022.

=== Opening credits ===
Graphic designer Fred Davis created a white letter "O", which is featured on a black background at the beginning of each episode. Within the quartered circle of the O are four symbols that foreshadow the main plot points in that episode. Additionally, each of these hand-drawn symbolic images is formed to represent the remaining letters in "Ozark". For example, for episode one, a kneeling man represents "Z"; a building represents "A"; a gun represents "R"; and a falling man represents "K".

=== Filming ===
Most of the shooting locations are in the Atlanta area at Lake Allatoona and Lake Lanier, rather than at the Lake of the Ozarks, because of tax breaks offered by Georgia. JD's on the Lake, a lakeside restaurant in Canton, Georgia, was chosen as the location for The Blue Cat Lodge in the show. The film crew constructed a set in Georgia after extensively studying the Alhonna Resort property. Some scenes are filmed at Chicago locations. The series has also filmed in Georgia locations such as Berkeley Lake, Stone Mountain, Savannah, Norcross, Johns Creek, and Peachtree Corners.

The cinematography was primarily handled by Ben Kutchins for the first three seasons. The series was initially filmed with the Panasonic VariCam, and later switched to the Sony Venice for season three onwards. The series is known for its distinctive color grading, which is characterized by heavy blue hues, dim lighting, and deep shadows. Kutchins explained that the cinematography is intended to engage audiences to "[look] around the frame to see what's lurking in the shadows." From the third season onward, the series' visual style was brightened and its color palette expanded to reflect the prominent new settings of the casino and Navarro's estate.

== Episodes ==
Ozark series overview
Season	Episodes		Originally released
1	10		July 21, 2017
2	10		August 31, 2018
3	10		March 27, 2020
4	14	7	January 21, 2022
4	14	7	April 29, 2022

=== Season 1 (2017) ===
Ozark, season-one episodes
No. overall	No. in season	Title	Directed by	Written by	Original release date
1	1	"Sugarwood"	Jason Bateman	Story by : Bill Dubuque & Mark Williams; Teleplay by : Bill Dubuque	July 21, 2017
Marty Byrde and his partner Bruce Liddell are Chicago-based financial advisers who launder money for a Mexican drug cartel. Bruce and the trucking company owners who move the cash skim $8 million, which causes their cartel contact Del to kill Bruce, Bruce's fiancée Liz, and the father-son trucking company owners. To save his own life, Marty uses a promotional flier Bruce showed him as the inspiration for a spur-of-the-moment claim that the Ozarks are a good potential location for laundering and that if allowed to live, he will wash $500 million in five years. Partly persuaded, Del gives Marty a few days to replace the $8 million Bruce stole, which he does by liquidating all his personal assets and closing all the company accounts. Del then tells Marty to move his family to the Ozarks and prove his claim by laundering the $8 million in three months. Marty's wife Wendy is having an affair with Gary "Sugarwood" Silverberg. She follows his advice to leave Marty and take their two children and as much money as she can secure, which causes Del to have Silverberg killed as a warning to Wendy to keep the family together.
2	2	"Blue Cat"	Jason Bateman	Story by : Bill Dubuque & Mark Williams; Teleplay by : Bill Dubuque	July 21, 2017
Wendy, Marty, and their children Charlotte and Jonah arrive in the Ozarks and begin to meet local residents, including several members of the Langmore family, who work at the hotel where they are staying. Marty attempts to find local businesses in which to invest so he can commence money laundering for the cartel, while Wendy goes house hunting. Charlotte and Jonah disregard their parents' instructions to guard the hotel room, with Charlotte falling for a ruse planned by cousins Ruth and Wyatt Langmore. Ruth enters the vacant room and steals part of the $8 million. Marty risks his life to recover the cash from Ruth, Wyatt, and other Langmores, but it is clear they will continue to be trouble. The FBI discovers the remains of Bruce and the others who were killed with him, which makes them suspicious of Marty's sudden move from Chicago. Agent Roy Petty follows Marty to the Ozarks, convinced he is somehow involved. Marty considers suicide so Wendy can collect his life insurance and flee with the children, but changes his mind after discovering the Blue Cat Lodge and Restaurant might be a suitable place in which to invest.
3	3	"My Dripping Sleep"	Daniel Sackheim	Ryan Farley	July 21, 2017
The Byrdes move into a lakefront house, while Buddy, the terminally ill homeowner, moves to the basement. FBI Agent Trevor Evans, Roy's former boyfriend, follows Roy's instructions to approach the Byrdes, who are not intimidated and continue maintaining their innocence. The Byrdes are made aware that while skimming money, Bruce was also an FBI informant. Trevor sees that Roy is becoming obsessed, foretelling continued problems for the Byrdes. Charlotte and Jonah are told the real reason for their move to the Ozarks, and Jonah does online research to learn more about the cartel. Wendy gets a job as an advance person and "stager" for Sam, the real-estate broker with whom she dealt when buying Buddy's house. Charlotte abruptly ends her job interview when she spots Wyatt outside the store, and she punches him in retaliation for his ruse at the hotel. Marty begins activities at the Blue Cat, despite the suspicions of Rachel, the primary owner. Ruth uses her knowledge of the Byrdes' cash to persuade Marty to hire her as a dishwasher at the Blue Cat and informs her cousins and uncles that her plan is to learn Marty's money-laundering operation, kill him, and take the money.
4	4	"Tonight We Improvise"	Daniel Sackheim	Paul Kolsby	July 21, 2017
Marty gathers information on Lickety Splitz, a money-losing strip club; turned away by the owner previously, he still intends to control it so he can use it for money laundering. Jonah finds the carcass of a coyote and cuts it open, giving his parents cause for concern. They are relieved to find that he was only studying the vultures that came to feed. Marty hires Ruth to break into the Lickety Splitz safe. Working undercover, Roy watches Marty at the Blue Cat, and develops an interest in Russ Langmore, Wyatt's father and Ruth's uncle. Bobby Dean, the owner of Lickety Splitz, is arrested because of Ruth's plan, and Marty gains access to the safe. He posts Bobby's bail and uses the information from the safe to force Bobby to sell the club. Jacob and Darlene Snell, for whom Bobby was laundering money, are revealed as major heroin dealers. They kill Bobby as retaliation for losing the club, and to keep their drug business secret. Marty shares business secrets with Jonah, including how to make new cash used in drug transactions look old so it can be mixed with cash from legitimate business before being deposited at the bank.
5	5	"Ruling Days"	Andrew Bernstein	Martin Zimmerman	July 21, 2017
Bobby's body turns up at the Byrdes' boat dock, which they unconvincingly explain away as an accident. Shown copies of the sale documents for the strip club, Sheriff Nix realizes he has no evidence the Byrdes had a motive to kill Bobby, and takes no further action. Jacob attempts to persuade Marty to launder money for him at Lickety Splitz. Marty sees Mason Young, the local pastor, holding boat-based Sunday services on the lake and realizes that building Mason a church could present an opportunity to launder money. Marty asks Ruth to run the strip club over the Fourth of July weekend, which leads to him hiring her as the full-time manager; she betters Bobby's management with actions, including hiring new staff, that turn Lickety Splitz into a moneymaker. Ruth continues to follow her incarcerated father Cade's advice to learn more about Marty's money laundering and discovers the hiding place where he stashed the $8 million he brought from Chicago. Roy continues to use Russ as a fishing guide, and attempts to kiss him, provoking a violent reaction from Russ. Russ later admits he has feelings for Roy and they become lovers.
6	6	"Book of Ruth"	Andrew Bernstein	Whit Anderson	July 21, 2017
The Snells show Marty their operation and inform him they use Mason's church on the lake to distribute heroin. They warn Marty to stop church construction, with implied threats to Mason's pregnant wife Grace if Marty does not persuade him to resume boat-based services. Del sends Wendy and Marty a package containing a pair of eyeballs, which they recognize as a warning to speed up the money laundering. Charlotte works at the Blue Cat and declines Wyatt's "antitourists" party invitation to go with Zach, a tourist from Chicago. She loses her virginity, but Zach departs the next day without saying goodbye, prompting Wyatt to tell her tourists always leave, and she is now "one of us" – a permanent local resident. Ruth and Russ devise a plan to kill Marty at Cade's instigation. Russ tells Roy, who secretly intervenes. Rachel confronts Marty over irregularities in the Blue Cat's books, forcing Marty to admit his money laundering operation. Marty appears likely to meet the three-month deadline for laundering the cartel's $8 million, and Wendy and he temporarily reconcile in celebration. During sex, Marty intentionally reminds her of an encounter with Sugarwood, causing her discovery of the video Marty's private investigator made.
7	7	"Nest Box"	Ellen Kuras	Alyson Feltes	July 21, 2017
Mason does not end church construction. To dissuade the Snells from killing him, Marty hands over the last $700,000 of cartel cash. Marty tells Mason the Snells are drug dealers and want him to resume services on the lake. The Snells tell Mason that Marty was constructing the church so he could launder money. Understanding Marty's claims of philanthropy are false, Mason burns down the building's framework. Charlotte and Jonah start school, and Charlotte is depressed about the family's changed circumstances. After she skips classes to take a bus to Chicago, Ruth and Wendy catch up and bring her back. Roy convinces Russ to try starting a bait-and-tackle shop with Marty as an investor. Roy also convinces Russ to say he will not be involved in any more attempts to kill Marty. Cade tells Ruth not to visit him again unless Marty is dead. After returning home, Charlotte goes for a night swim. Ignoring Marty's advice to stay near the shore, she swims far into the lake. After nearly allowing herself to drown, she touches bottom and realizes the water is not as deep as she thought. She giddily makes her way back to shore, her depression gone.
8	8	"Kaleidoscope"	Ellen Kuras	Ryan Farley	July 21, 2017
A flashback to 2007 shows Wendy and Marty driving when she reveals she is pregnant again. While discussing the news, they are involved in a car accident that causes a miscarriage, which results in Wendy's extended period of depression. Wendy unsuccessfully attempts to re-enter the job market after the births of her children. An experienced public-relations operative, she is revealed to have worked for Bobby Rush's early congressional campaigns and Barack Obama's campaigns for the Illinois Senate. Del approaches Marty and Bruce to launder the cartel's money, and after reviewing Del's ledgers, they decline, but agree to reconsider. Marty expects Wendy will be opposed, but to his surprise, she approves. Bruce and Marty commit to work for Del, and Del has his previous financial advisor Louis killed in front of them. Not only was Louis skimming, which Del suspected and Marty confirmed when analyzing the ledgers, but he was also informing to Roy at the FBI. Roy has a steady boyfriend and fledgling FBI career, but a difficult relationship with his mother, who is a heroin addict. Unhappy at the FBI's insistence on pursuing terrorists rather than drug dealers, Roy plots to get his way.
9	9	"Coffee, Black"	Jason Bateman	Whit Anderson	July 21, 2017
Buddy taught Jonah to shoot, and after realizing a cartel operative is shadowing the Byrdes, Jonah has Blue Cat employee Tuck buy him a rifle in a straw purchase. Marty and Wendy previously convinced Sam's mother Eugenia to deposit her savings in Marty's new "investment fund"; her $900,000 replaces the $700,000 Marty paid the Snells. With this influx, he completes laundering the $8 million on time. The cartel immediately delivers $50 million – the first of the $500 million Marty promised to wash. Eugenia dies in an accident, and Sam wants access to her savings to pay for her elaborate funeral. Instead, Marty and Wendy volunteer to pay, and end up buying the funeral home. Roy reveals to Russ that their relationship is a ploy, and he recorded Russ's admission of trying to kill Marty. This forces Russ to turn informant against Ruth, whom Roy intends to turn against Marty. Instead, Russ and his brother Boyd plan to rob and kill Marty to finance a life on the run. Ruth suspects Russ intends to kill Marty. Realizing she will be blamed if Marty dies, Ruth acts first, killing Russ and Boyd with the same method she earlier tried on Marty.
10	10	"The Toll"	Jason Bateman	Chris Mundy	July 21, 2017
The Byrdes try to be supportive of Wyatt and Three, but Wyatt suspects Marty killed Russ and Boyd. Mason's conscience renders him unable to preach on the lake. He arrives home to find the Snells retaliated; Grace is gone, but he discovers a newborn. Marty decides his family would not be safe if they stay. Garcia, the cartel operative, prevents them from leaving. Jonah sneaks out to retrieve his rifle. When he attempts to shoot Garcia, he finds Buddy unloaded it. Buddy holds Garcia at gunpoint as Wendy and the children depart, then shoots him. Rachel finds part of the $50 million. After a brief encounter with Del, she drives away with the cash. Del tortures Marty to find out where Garcia is. Marty explains a plan for the cartel to distribute Snell heroin, while the Snells allow a casino on their property to launder cartel money. Del is intrigued and intends to explain away Garcia's death if a deal occurs. Del and the Snells agree, but Darlene kills Del when he replies to her racist insults with one of his own. Wendy and the children decide to stay and face the risks with Marty rather than flee without him.

=== Season 2 (2018) ===
Ozark, season-two episodes
No. overall	No. in season	Title	Directed by	Written by	Original release date
11	1	"Reparations"	Jason Bateman	Chris Mundy	August 31, 2018
Darlene and the Snells' associate Ash cremate Del's body on the Snell farm. Marty and Jacob send Ash to Chicago with Del's car and credit cards to establish Del's presence there, enabling them to claim he was not in the Ozarks. Without Del to negotiate, Marty and the Snells meet with cartel attorney Helen Pierce to discuss the casino. Marty discusses with State Senator Brock Mercer the possibility of introducing legislation to allow casino construction. Mercer tells Marty to go to "the lake house". Marty and Wendy learn this is the home of businessman and political donor Charles Wilkes. They meet with Wilkes and try to persuade him to back the legislation. Cade is paroled. Helen shows the Byrdes video of Ash using Del's credit card in Chicago. She will overlook Del's death (and Garcia's) in exchange for "reparations" from the Snells, but does not tell Marty what will be satisfactory. At Darlene's insistence, the Snells refuse to offer money, but Jacob understands a life must be paid, so he kills Ash to save Darlene. Marty and Wendy hide the truth from Charlotte and Jonah, but acknowledge to each other that Ash's death satisfied the Navarros, meaning the casino project is still alive.
12	2	"The Precious Blood of Jesus"	Jason Bateman	David Manson	August 31, 2018
The Kansas City Mafia sends Senator Mercer an unsubtle message, causing state senate support for the casino bill to waver. Marty capitalizes on Buddy's prior relationship with mafia associate Frank Cosgrove to reach an agreement that the casino will be unionized, which keeps the project viable. Wendy attends a prayer breakfast to woo faltering senators and resorts to blackmail. Wilkes makes a play for Wendy as the price for obtaining the vote of the last senate holdout, but Wendy rebuffs him. Wendy sees Mason preaching on the streets of Jefferson City with baby Zeke at his side. Cade rebuffs the job Ruth persuaded Marty to offer. Marty gives Ruth more responsibilities, including entrusting her with the cash to pay for acquiring and moving the riverboat that will house the casino. Cade robs a diner to show Ruth that he has not changed and demands her help in locating Marty's money. Rachel is arrested when her drug-and-drinking binges result in her wrecking her car; Roy coerces her into returning to the Blue Cat and becoming an informant against Marty.
13	3	"Once a Langmore..."	Andrew Bernstein	Alyson Feltes	August 31, 2018
The casino bill passes, but Senator Blake commits suicide. The Byrde businesses are closed by state inspectors at Roy's instigation, allowing Rachel to return and leaving the Byrdes to wonder who ordered it. Rachel attempts to obtain evidence against Marty, with Roy using stolen drugs to keep her in line. Wilkes wants a large casino-adjacent development in exchange for his aid, but the Snells will not sell more land. The Snells, Marty, and Jonah go hunting to discuss it, and Jonah kills a deer. The Snells torch Wilkes' boat as a warning to stop pressuring them. Wendy talks Blake's widow out of suing Wilkes for wrongful death by promising a charity in Blake's name. Ruth creates a problem at the boat-repair shop where Cade works, which persuades the owner to sell and gives Marty a new business for laundering. Charlotte spends time with Wyatt, who continues pondering the deaths of Russ and Boyd. The Byrdes have dinner at the Snell house to celebrate their rapprochement, including venison from Jonah's deer. Jonah uses his half of the $10,000 Charlotte took when helping hide the cartel's $50 million to open a bank account as Michael Fleming, the alias he received when the Byrdes fled after Garcia's death.
14	4	"Stag"	Andrew Bernstein	Ryan Farley	August 31, 2018
Wyatt's suspicion that Marty killed Russ and Boyd is heightened by Charlotte's admission that the Byrdes were at the scene. Roy pressures Rachel for useful information, including pretending to be a Blue Cat bar customer. Rachel has bathroom sex with a bar pickup and calls him Marty to irritate Roy, who is monitoring her transmitter. To deflect Marty's suspicion from her, Rachel suggests the man from the Blue Cat (Roy) might be a police officer. An infuriated Roy threatens her with a violent end if she does not produce evidence. The Byrdes' planned bribe of a state gaming official ends when Wendy correctly suspects a trap. Wendy tries to provide money to Mason, who angrily refuses. Marty pays scant attention to Ruth while handling other problems, so she confides in Rachel, who uses the relationship to gather evidence for Roy. He obtains a search warrant for the Byrde home, where he identifies himself to Marty and Wendy for the first time. Sam runs Lickety Splitz in name only because, as a felon, Ruth cannot be associated with Marty during state scrutiny of the casino application. Buddy's health declines, and he is hospitalized, but recovers after returning home.
15	5	"Game Day"	Phil Abraham	Paul Kolsby	August 31, 2018
The FBI finds Charlotte's half of the $10,000 she took, which Roy brings up during Marty's interrogation in the hopes that he will turn informant. Roy also informs him that Ruth tried to kill him by wiring the dock the same way she did when she killed her uncles. Roy makes Ruth look like an informant, and Helen asks the Byrdes whether she can be trusted. Marty hesitates before saying yes, then races to the Langmores to warn Ruth. Ruth admits she tried to kill Marty, but says she will not try again because circumstances have changed; Helen's associates subject Ruth to waterboarding interrogation. Ruth does not crack, and Helen tells Marty she is impressed with Ruth's toughness. Marty reminds Wendy that she cheated on him, and Charlotte overhears and informs Jonah. Charlotte and Jonah discuss using what is left of the money they took to buy a van and run away. Helen tells the Snells to burn their poppies so Roy will not find any evidence, but Darlene resists. Wendy brings Darlene adoption information, which is a ploy to enable Buddy to gain access to the Snell farm and burn the field.
16	6	"Outer Darkness"	Phil Abraham	Ning Zhou	August 31, 2018
While leaving the Snell farm, Buddy dies in Wendy's car, and the Byrdes arrange an elaborate funeral. Jonah uses Buddy's Rolodex to contact his friends, and the large crowd includes Frank and his Kansas City associates. Roy leads a raid on the Snell farm, and Jacob says the burned field was an intentional controlled fire. Roy scoffs, but is ecstatic to find buried bones. Mason returns, hoping the bones include Grace's remains, and volunteers Zeke for DNA testing. Wyatt is expelled for aiding Jonah during a school fight. Marty and the Snells disinter several Snell ancestors and use their remains to replace the bones the FBI found, throwing off test results and enabling Jacob to claim authorities desecrated his family's burial places. Roy interrogates Wilkes, who offers to inform on Marty in exchange for Wendy's protection, but she refuses to leave Marty. Ruth agrees to help her father with his illegal activities, deciding that working with Marty will not produce the long-term benefits for which she hoped. Marty promises Rachel that after the casino is approved, he will return the Blue Cat to her. She kisses Marty to prevent him from revealing more, then reveals she is wearing a wire.
17	7	"One Way Out"	Alik Sakharov	Martin Zimmerman	August 31, 2018
Marty wants to keep Rachel working at the Blue Cat and using her to feed Roy misinformation. Wendy is suspicious of both Rachel and Marty's relationship with her. The police take Zeke into state custody, prompting Mason to kidnap Wendy and hold her in the basement of his home while demanding Marty's aid in getting Zeke back. Cade and Ruth attempt to steal the FLIR System from an expensive boat and sell it to a black-market buyer. The owner is unexpectedly home, forcing them to flee empty-handed. Ruth tells Cade she believes Marty's cartel money may be hidden at the funeral home and agrees to help him steal it. Marty and Wilkes succeed in retrieving Zeke from state custody. Marty brings him to Mason, but ends up killing Mason during a confrontation afterwards. Marty and Wendy clean up the basement of Mason's house and cremate his body at the funeral home, then take Zeke home as a supposed foster child. The Byrdes use the baby to help present a likable family image during a news interview arranged by a public relations representative trying to create positive coverage of the casino project.
18	8	"The Big Sleep"	Alik Sakharov	David Manson	August 31, 2018
With Roy no longer giving Rachel drugs, she buys heroin and overdoses (ODs). The heroin distributed by the Navarros is laced with fentanyl, and numerous ODs are traced to the Snells; Darlene spiked it as revenge for the cartel's insistence on burning the poppy field. The Navarros ambush the Snells. Ruth and Cade break into the funeral home, but find no cash. Marty gets Wyatt's expulsion rescinded, keeping alive Wyatt's chances for admission to the University of Missouri. Charlotte steals an expensive book for Wyatt, which he refuses, explaining the disparity in punishment if a Langmore is blamed instead of someone like her. Wendy uses the laundering network Jonah created to donate to Wilkes's charity. When Wendy informs him that he accepted cartel money, he realizes he is blackmailed into continuing to support the casino project. Marty learns Roy's mother is an addict and has a Navarro associate supply her with drugs. Roy returns home to care for her, enabling Marty to send Rachel to Miami for addiction treatment. After buying a van and living in it to stay away from home, Charlotte informs her parents of her desire for emancipation.
19	9	"The Badger"	Ben Semanoff	Paul Kolsby & Martin Zimmerman	August 31, 2018
Charlotte hires an attorney for her emancipation case. Wilkes arranges for the Byrdes to meet the gaming commissioners, and the chairman requests a nonunion site in exchange for his support, to which Marty agrees, despite knowing it will anger Frank. The casino is approved, and Marty arranges an exit for his family that includes fleeing to Australia and leaving cartel business in Ruth's hands, to which Ruth agrees. Cade and Wyatt rob Lickety Splitz, and Ruth does not identify them to the sheriff, but does try to recover and return the money. Wyatt is accepted to college; he is not sure about going, but Ruth is determined to send him to keep him from a life of crime. Jacob and Darlene survive the ambush, though Jacob is wounded. Marty and Helen inform Jacob that riparian rights and eminent domain enable the government to seize land for the casino if the Snells will not sell. Jacob acquiesces and decides to kill Darlene to keep the peace. As he moves to stab her on their morning walk, he suddenly collapses. Darlene tells him she guessed his plan and poisoned his coffee, and they pledge their love to each other before he dies.
20	10	"The Gold Coast"	Amanda Marsalis	Chris Mundy	August 31, 2018
Roy returns to finish pending business before his Chicago transfer. He goes fishing and is confronted by Cade, who kills Roy and sinks his body. Darlene wants Zeke and shaves Jonah's head as a warning, forcing the Byrdes to hand Zeke over. Marty shows Ruth details of cartel business in preparation for his family's departure, including the location of the cartel's $50 million – Buddy's mausoleum. Knowing he was recognized while hiding Roy's car, Cade plans to flee before he is arrested. He tries blackmailing Ruth for money by threatening to tell Wyatt she killed Russ and Boyd. Instead, Ruth tells Wyatt, who drives away in anger. Angry that Cade attacked Charlotte while trying to find Marty's money, Wendy offers him $500,000 to leave town. Cade takes it and drives away, but the payoff is a ruse and Helen's bodyguard Nelson kills him in an ambush. Frank blows up Marty's office as a warning to solve the union versus nonunion labor issue. At the casino's opening ceremony, Helen tells the Byrdes she is returning to Chicago. Wendy tells Marty the family is not fleeing to the Gold Coast because it is safer to stay. Marty realizes Wendy had Cade killed.

=== Season 3 (2020) ===
Ozark, season-three episodes
No. overall	No. in season	Title	Directed by	Written by	Original release date
21	1	"Wartime"	Jason Bateman	Chris Mundy	March 27, 2020
The Navarros are involved in a cartel war in Mexico. Marty and Ruth manage the Missouri Belle's casino, while Wendy and Charlotte handle public relations. Jonah makes money as a gold farmer. Charlotte insists Marty and Wendy attend couples therapy, but Marty secretly pays for sham sessions. Wendy suggests the Navarro cartel expand into legitimate businesses, but Marty thinks the plan is too risky. The cartel waterboards Helen to determine if her ex-husband Gene knows anything incriminating about her. Helen insists he does not, so she is released. After attending a new mothers' group, Darlene slashes another mom's car tire. Wyatt breaks into vacant homes to live and refuses Ruth's cash. He is arrested and declines Ruth's bail money. Darlene overhears, posts Wyatt's bail, and employs him on her farm. Charlotte gives Jonah a drone, which he plans to use to improve security at the Byrde home. Marty devises a new money laundering method to evade FBI scrutiny. Wendy and Helen meet Navarro in Chicago, and he approves Wendy's expansion plan. Ruth throws Frank Cosgrove Jr. overboard for becoming unruly at a Missouri Belle poker game. Wendy uses a hidden key to enter and vandalize the Byrdes' former Chicago home.
22	2	"Civil Union"	Jason Bateman	Martin Zimmerman	March 27, 2020
Wendy's brother Ben is teaching when students begin sharing a digital photo, so he throws their phones into a woodchipper, then fights with its operator. Marty and Ruth apologize to Frank Sr. for Ruth's attack on Frank Jr. and agree to a larger percentage of casino profits as a peace offering. Helen and her daughter Erin move to the Ozarks for the summer, but Gene insists their son Seth stay with him. Marty and Wendy make an offer to Carl and Anita Knarlson for their Big Muddy casino in St. Joseph, but Marty secretly talks Carl into declining. Ben arrives for an extended visit. Marty pays Frank Sr. for a fire that closes the Knarlsons' competitor, which prompts Anita to decline Helen and Wendy's new offer. Navarro calls Wendy to ask whether his maid's accident was a bad omen and is appreciative when she calms him. Darlene talks to dead Jacob about how angry she was after seeing Wendy, and Wyatt admits he sometimes talks to his dead father. Ruth and Wendy rig the Big Muddy's slot machines for constant payouts, so the Knarlsons sell. Helen has Gene beaten. Trevor informs Marty the FBI will audit all Byrde businesses.
23	3	"Kevin Cronin Was Here"	Cherien Dabis	Miki Johnson	March 27, 2020
Wendy dreams of killing Marty. The Knarlsons refuse to sell their hotel. Marty and Ruth's plan to launder at the Big Muddy casino ends because Wendy closes it for renovations. Frank Sr. lets Wendy know Marty arranged the fire. Helen tells Marty Navarro does not want laundering at the Big Muddy. Wendy tells Carl to obtain Anita's agreement to sell by any means necessary. Helen asks Ruth if she could run the Missouri Belle without Marty. Ruth says yes and then tells Marty about the conversation. Carl and Anita argue, and he accidentally kills her by pushing her down a hill. Marty works out a laundering arrangement with REO Speedwagon when they play at the casino. Wendy provokes Darlene into striking her, giving Wendy cause for a custody hearing for Zeke. FBI agent Maya Miller offers Marty a deal that enables him to work for the FBI after 18 months of incarceration. Trevor identifies Frank Jr.'s friend Tommy as one of the casino arsonists and obtains his cooperation. Marty uses monitoring software when Wendy calls Navarro to report buying the hotel. Navarro tells her their connection is compromised. Marty tells Maya he accepts. Cartel operatives seize Marty and thwart Ruth and Ben's pursuit.
24	4	"Boss Fight"	Cherien Dabis	John Shiban	March 27, 2020
Marty is brought to Navarro's home in Mexico. Ben tells Wendy that Marty was taken. Wendy tells Ben the truth about for whom they work. Ben tells Charlotte and Jonah the truth about where Marty is. Helen learns from Mendoza that Navarro is testing them to see if they can launder without Marty. While being sleep-deprived in a cell, Marty has childhood flashbacks to his father's hospital-room death. Navarro asks Marty why he spies on Wendy. Marty admits he fears her. Navarro says he admires Wendy because she is clear about her objective – "she wants it all." Ruth sets up a laundering team at the Missouri Belle that includes Ben. Charlotte admits to Helen that she knows about her parents' criminal activities. Helen cautions her not to tell Erin. Ruth discovers that one of their accounts is frozen for suspicious activity. Marty shows Navarro how to regain control of it. In response to Navarro's repeated question, "What do you want?", Marty finally says he wants to launder only when he says it is safe. He also wants to be thanked for his superior expertise in laundering Navarro's cash. A cartel car returns Marty to the Byrde family home.
25	5	"It Came From Michoacán"	Amanda Marsalis	Laura Deeley	March 27, 2020
Wendy explains Ruth's laundering team ("smurfing") to Marty. As part of phasing it out, Wendy asks Sam to intentionally lose a large sum at the casino and be repaid in cash. Ruth tells Frank Jr. to stop loan-sharking because Marty's plan includes extending lines of credit to customers. Navarro instructs Wendy and Marty to buy a Kentucky horse farm. Erin insists on seeing Tommy. He recognizes Helen's name and snoops in the Byrde house. Cosgrove's employees make a drop of Navarro cash to Ruth, lock her in the truck, and take her for a bruising ride. Wyatt lies at the custody hearing, so Darlene keeps Zeke. Through Wilkes's lawyer, Wendy obtains information on Maya showing her as incorruptible, but Marty sees an opening. Darlene and Wyatt begin a sexual relationship, and she decides to restart her heroin business. Wendy bribes their therapist Sue into helping maneuver Marty into agreeing with her. Ben covers Frank Jr.'s car in birdseed, and a flock of birds causes extensive damage. Helen gives Marty client information he uses to bait Maya. Navarro operatives at the horse farm geld the prize stud belonging to Navarro's enemy Lagunas. Marty pretends to cooperate with Maya.
26	6	"Su Casa Es Mi Casa"	Ben Semanoff	Paul Kolsby	March 27, 2020
Marty and Wendy reveal details of their illegal activities during a heated therapy session. Marty moves out. Darlene tells Helen she is restarting her heroin business, but Helen refuses to renew their partnership. A party at an isolated cove ends with the arrests of Tommy, Erin, Charlotte and Jonah. Helen and Wendy argue over responsibility for Erin's activities. Tommy reports to Trevor on his efforts to obtain evidence against the Byrdes. Ruth and Ben spend a night together and Ben's inability to perform causes him to stop taking his bipolar disorder medication. Wendy plans to start a charitable foundation. Darlene and Wyatt attempt to hire Three to tend to Darlene's poppies. Three tells Ruth about Darlene and Wyatt's living arrangement. Wyatt tells Ruth he will not move back home. Marty is followed by an SUV and the Byrdes spend the night in their dining room while Nelson stands guard. The next day Helen reports three SUVs headed to Chicago. Ben and Jonah use Jonah's drone to watch Ruth during the next Cosgrove cash drop. The same SUVs rapidly approach and Ben warns Ruth, who hides as they arrive. The occupants shoot Frank Jr.'s men, then blow up Frank's truck.
27	7	"In Case of Emergency"	Alik Sakharov	Ning Zhou	March 27, 2020
Trevor and Maya interview Ruth, who denies knowledge of the truck fire and killings. Marty tells Frank Sr. the attack was executed by the Lagunas. Trevor and Maya accuse Marty of arranging it because he knew Tommy was an informant, which Marty denies. Frank Jr. tells Ruth that Trevor and Maya accused her of the attack, which Ruth denies. Wendy persuades Navarro that the Byrdes' plan to expand his business into legitimate ventures remains viable. After Maya questions Sam about his losses, Sam calls Marty, who promises to keep him out of trouble. Frank Jr. attacks Ruth, who is hospitalized, so Marty cuts ties with Frank Sr. Erin refuses her mother's request to return to Chicago. Recognizing he is politically ambitious, Wendy gives Andrew Wade the information on Helen's client that Maya refused to accept. Wyatt tells Darlene that Ruth killed Russ and Boyd, and Darlene admits she killed Jacob. Helen is concerned about Sue's knowledge of the Byrdes and has Nelson kill her and remove the Byrdes' files from her records. Ruth tells Marty and Wendy that she wants Frank Jr. killed, but Marty refuses. Wyatt visits Ruth at home and blames the Byrdes for all the Langmores' troubles.
28	8	"BFF"	Alik Sakharov	John Shiban	March 27, 2020
Sue is not home and Marty realizes she has been killed. Erin, Charlotte, and Jonah perform community service. Helen confirms to Wendy that Sue is dead and says she is tired of cleaning up after the Byrdes. Marty gives Maya information on another financial fraud, but Maya refuses to accept. Wendy gives it to Senator Wade, who gives it to Special Agent in Charge Clay. Clay criticizes Maya's refusal and orders her back to Washington, DC, when her warrant to investigate the Byrdes expires. Ben drives Ruth's truck past trucking company guards to get to Frank Jr., but several employees appear and force a hasty retreat. Afterwards, Ben gets drunk at a bar and attacks another customer. Ben confronts Marty and Wendy at the launch party for the charity, punches Marty, and gets committed to the state mental hospital. Ruth visits Ben, who tells her he realized Wendy had Cade killed. Helen tells Navarro that Wendy and Marty are liabilities, and Navarro tells her to do what she thinks best. Darlene persuades Nix to get Ben released in exchange for Nix's deputies not being included in Darlene's drug business. Ben goes to Helen's house, where he confronts Helen and Erin.
29	9	"Fire Pink"	Alik Sakharov	Miki Johnson	March 27, 2020
In a taxi following his confrontation with Helen and Erin, Ben engages in an incoherent monologue. Marty asks Ruth why she worked for Ben's release. Ben arrives at Ruth's and admits he went to Helen's. Ruth hides Ben at Darlene's. Erin confronts Charlotte and Jonah, and they admit Ben is right. Erin tells Helen she knows the truth about Helen's work and returns to Chicago. Recognizing they are vulnerable because Ben exposed Helen to Erin, Marty and Wendy plot to show Navarro they are more valuable than Helen. Ben leaves Darlene's so he can pledge his love to Ruth. Nelson follows him into the casino, so Marty takes Ben out a side exit. Nelson follows Ruth home and Ruth challenges him about Cade's murder. Marty engineers a sudden increase in casino profits, giving Maya a reason to stay and continue auditing the Byrdes. Ben flees with Wendy but calls the police on himself. Wendy talks officers out of arresting him. Ben calls Helen to apologize but Wendy ends the call before Helen learns Ben's location. Wendy abandons Ben at a restaurant, then breaks down during a call to Marty. Ben walks outside. Nelson exits his car approaching Ben.
30	10	"All In"	Alik Sakharov	Chris Mundy	March 27, 2020
Marty cremates Ben's body at the funeral home. Marty tries to persuade Wendy to return home. Lagunas cartel members attack Navarro's son's baptism. Wyatt tells Ruth that Darlene wants him to meet her mum. Helen tells Navarro she wants to take over the Byrde businesses. Maya arrests Sam for suspected money laundering. Wendy returns home but Jonah asks her if her return is for good. Ruth and Wendy argue about blame for Ben's and Cade's deaths, and Ruth quits working for Marty. Wendy admits she made the call revealing Ben's location. Marty consoles her by agreeing with her plan to make Navarro see their value by ending the cartel war. Marty provides still photos from Jonah's drone video of the Lagunas attack on Cosgrove's truck to Maya, prompting US military action against the Lagunas. Darlene avenges Ruth by shooting Frank Jr. in the genitals, then avoids retaliation by striking a heroin distribution deal with his father. Jonah confronts Helen at gunpoint about Ben's death, but she talks him out of shooting by telling him of Wendy's involvement. Helen obtains from Trevor a written copy of Marty's confession to the FBI. Navarro requires Wendy, Marty, and Helen to attend his son's second baptism in Mexico. Upon arrival Nelson kills Helen, and Navarro tells Marty and Wendy this is the beginning of increased cooperation between the three of them.

=== Season 4 (2022) ===
Ozark, seasonfour episodes
No. overall	No. in season	Title	Directed by	Written by	Original release date
Part 1
31	1	"The Beginning of the End"	Andrew Bernstein	Chris Mundy	January 21, 2022
In a flash forward, the Byrdes discuss an upcoming FBI meeting in their minivan when they are nearly struck by an oncoming truck, then roll over. In the present, Navarro's guests enjoy his party, while Marty and Wendy wash off Helen's remains in a bathroom. At the party, Navarro tells them they are considered celebrities because they caused military action against the Lagunas cartel. Navarro introduces his nephew Javier, who wants to assume a leadership role, and asks how they will persuade Darlene to stop selling heroin; they claim they are proceeding cautiously because of Darlene's hold over Sheriff Nix. Jonah gives Ben's ashes to Ruth. In a meeting with Marty and Wendy, Navarro says Javi is impatient to take over, and will kill them all if he senses weakness. Navarro asks the Byrdes to broker a deal that enables him to retire without prosecution. Wendy is skeptical, but Marty agrees to try. Private investigator Mel Sattem attempts to find Helen so she can sign documents related to her divorce. Nix visits Helen's home at Sattem's suggestion, where Javi answers the door. Javi kills Nix and delivers the body to the Byrdes for disposal at their crematorium, witnessed by Jonah.
32	2	"Let the Great World Spin"	Andrew Bernstein	Laura Deeley	January 21, 2022
Ruth hides Ben's ashes before Wendy confronts her over them. Nix's temporary replacement is Leigh Guerrero, sheriff of an adjacent county. Javi directs Marty to clean Helen's house to hide evidence of Nix's death, then hides when Guerrero arrives. The Byrdes arrange to sell heroin to a pharmaceutical company that can cut costs on raw materials in exchange for a large donation to the Byrdes' foundation. Wendy intends to expand the Byrdes' influence by using the foundation to influence elections and bribe politicians. Convinced the cartel killed Nix, Frank Cosgrove Sr. cancels his distribution deal with Darlene. Trying to find alternative distribution channels, Ruth tries to persuade a celebrity chef to recommend Darlene's heroin to his friends. Darlene dislikes the idea of marketing her heroin as a "hipster" product and blocks Ruth's plan. Jonah remains upset with Wendy because of Ben's death and agrees to launder money for Ruth. After Wendy tries to dissuade him, Jonah reveals he knows about Nix. Maya is on maternity leave and stays with the Byrdes in order to attend a meeting with Navarro about him becoming a cooperating witness. Maya changes her mind, but Wendy persuades her to make the trip.
33	3	"City on the Make"	Andrew Bernstein	Martin Zimmerman	January 21, 2022
On board Navarro's plane, Maya details what the FBI expects from a deal, including prison time. Wendy builds an outdoor shrine to Ben, which she shows Charlotte and Jonah. Jonah rejects the overture and resumes laundering for Ruth and Darlene until Wendy turns off the basement's electricity. At the Lazy-O motel, which Ruth has purchased, Ruth rekindles her plan to distribute Darlene's heroin through celebrity chef Kerry Stone. Darlene is angry until she sees how much money they made. Erin tells Charlotte that Mel was hired by her father and cannot locate Helen. Jonah moves to the Lazy-O to resume laundering. Charlotte meets Erin in Chicago, implies that Helen is dead, and reminds Erin to remain silent about Helen's activities. Marty meets with Clare Shaw, the CEO planning to buy Navarro's heroin, and Javier arrives to participate. Wendy attempts to persuade Senator Schafer, a former political opponent, to join the board of the Byrdes' foundation. Marty hears Javi discuss an upcoming gun sale. He suggests to Navarro that allowing it to be interdicted will establish credibility with the FBI. During dinner with the Byrdes, Javi receives a call informing him the guns were intercepted.
34	4	"Ace Deuce"	Alik Sakharov	John Shiban	January 21, 2022
At a press conference, Wendy announces planned construction of drug-treatment centers financed by the Byrdes' foundation and gains sympathy by claiming Ben is missing as the result of a longstanding drug addiction. Sam is out of cash and banned from the casino, and Ruth hires him to manage the Lazy-O. While delivering a heroin shipment to the Shaw company, Javier tells Marty the FBI recently seized three others. Kerry and his friends visit the casino with Ruth. Kerry overdoses, and Ruth saves him with a Narcan injection. Ruth tells Darlene the overdose will not be traced to her, but Darlene kills Kerry's driver after he makes a blackmail attempt. Mel visits Wendy and Ben's father in North Carolina, who says Ben did not have a drug addiction. Sheriff Guerrero questions Ruth about the overdose. She later questions the Byrdes, and Wendy unsubtly points her to Ruth and Darlene. Javi obtains police body-camera video from the recent seizures and discovers Maya was present. Marty claims it is a coincidence, but Javi refuses to sell to the Shaws until the Navarro cartel mole is identified. As a stopgap, Marty offers to buy all Ruth and Darlene's heroin.
35	5	"Ellie"	Alik Sakharov	Paul Kolsby	January 21, 2022
In a flashback, Mel is a police detective caught snorting illegal drugs. In the present, Clare agrees to buy Ruth and Darlene's heroin. Unknown to Ruth, Darlene convinces Frank Jr. to distribute it. Wendy blames Jonah after missing-person posters for Ben appear, and Jonah reveals Darlene is behind them. Mel tells the Byrdes he spoke to Wendy's father Nathan and suggests that Ben killed Helen. Senator Schafer asks Wendy for an FBI file in exchange for joining her foundation's board. Marty and Ruth attempt to buy the heroin back from two dealers to whom Frank sold it. One sells to them at a premium, but the second refuses. Wendy files a missing-persons report on Ben with the sheriff. Jonah reveals to Darlene that he saw his parents with Sheriff Nix's body. Schafer reveals that he learned from the file that his grandson, who created software that can be used to rig elections, is not under investigation. Ruth, Marty, and Clare's security chief visit the second dealer, and Ruth persuades him to sell, enabling Marty to complete the deal with Clare. Darlene has a heart attack while arguing with Wendy, who hesitates before calling for help.
36	6	"Sangre Sobre Todo"	Robin Wright	Michael M. Chang & Jed Rapp Goldstein	January 21, 2022
Maya leads a raid on another Navarro shipment, but the driver causes casualties by detonating a bomb. Navarro tells Wendy that Javier was responsible. Darlene is hospitalized following her heart attack, and blames Ruth for selling their heroin to Marty without informing her. Darlene refuses Wendy's request to stop Jonah's money laundering. Wendy asks Jim to become the Byrdes' attorney. At a meeting between Marty, Maya, and her supervisor, a senior manager interrupts to say the FBI will deal with Navarro only after proof he was not behind the bombing. Navarro tells Javier he is retiring. The FBI records Marty obtaining Javier's confession to the bombing. Javi introduces himself to Jim, who says he works for the Byrdes, not the cartel. Darlene kills Frank Sr. after he confronts her about distributing her heroin through Frank Jr. Wyatt is appalled and agrees to leave Missouri with Ruth, who tells Frank Jr. about Frank Sr.'s murder in hopes he will retaliate. Wendy schemes to have Jonah arrested, knowing that juveniles are not harshly punished, and to have the state remove Zeke from Darlene's care. To aid in getting Zeke back, Wyatt proposes to Darlene. The FBI agrees to discuss Navarro's surrender terms.
37	7	"Sanctified"	Robin Wright	Miki Johnson	January 21, 2022
Marty recalls his former business partner Bruce mocking Marty's average life. Wyatt tells Ruth he is marrying Darlene; Ruth asks Frank Jr. not to kill Darlene. The FBI lays down unexpected terms to Navarro; in exchange for immunity, he must remain as cartel head for five years and provide intelligence. Maya is incensed that her supervisors lied about their intent. Navarro accepts and prepares to return to Mexico, but Maya and local police arrest him. Marty suggests that the FBI make the same deal with Javier. Javier tricks Marty into coming to Jim's house, then beats him. Wendy convinces Navarro to tell Javi he was working with the FBI, which stops Javi from killing Marty. Javi accepts the FBI's offer, but for 10 years. Navarro schemes to be released from prison and reclaim cartel leadership. The Byrdes intend to return to Chicago, but Jonah refuses. Javier kills Darlene and Wyatt in retaliation for Darlene's continued heroin sales. Ruth discovers the bodies and confronts Marty and Wendy with a shotgun. They deny responsibility or knowledge, but Jonah tells her Javier did it. Marty says Javi is untouchable, but Ruth screams that they will have to kill her to stop her.
Part 2
38	8	"The Cousin of Death"	Amanda Marsalis	Chris Mundy	April 29, 2022
Ruth weeps and grieves Wyatt. Javi instructs Marty to clean up the scene of Darlene and Wyatt's murders, but Marty finds that police are already there. Ruth implores Jonah and Charlotte for information, and Charlotte tells her that Javi will be meeting the next day with Marty, Wendy, and Clare at Shaw Medical in Chicago. Jonah provides Ruth with a photo of Javi taken from his business school yearbook. Ruth travels to Chicago and observes as Marty, Wendy, and Javi arrive for the meeting. Javi asks Clare for stock options in Shaw Medical on behalf of his mother Camila. After the meeting, Marty spots Ruth on the streets and admonishes her not to kill Javi. Javi meets with a professor from his business school to discuss a donation, and beats the man in retaliation for his past condescension. That night, Ruth corners the Byrdes and Clare at dinner, forces Clare to take them to her office, then demands that they call Javi. Wendy lures Javi to Clare's office with the promise of signing an agreement for the stock options. Ruth shoots him dead as soon as he arrives, then returns home while the Byrdes and Clare clean up the scene.
39	9	"Pick a God and Pray"	Amanda Marsalis	Laura Deeley	April 29, 2022
Marty tries to convince Wendy that Javi's death tarnishes their deal with the FBI, but Wendy insists on finding a way to salvage the family's future. FBI SAC Hannah Clay recommends the Byrdes go into witness protection, but Wendy plots to get Navarro extradited to Mexico to resume control of the cartel. Clay tells them they first need to remove Navarro from the government's SDN list. Navarro is initially irate upon hearing of Javi's murder, but ultimately agrees to Wendy's gambit, deciding to take credit for Javi's death as a means of regaining prestige in the cartel. Marty decides to travel to Mexico to temporarily assume command of the cartel's operations. Navarro's priest, Father Benitez, visits Wendy and suggests he wants Navarro to remain in prison. Wendy's father Nathan arrives in the Ozarks and hires Mel to investigate Ben's disappearance. Mel enlists the help of Maya, who has been demoted at the FBI after arresting Navarro. Disillusioned with the Byrdes, Clare visits Ruth the day after Wyatt's funeral and offers to buy Darlene's heroin from her. Clare calls Wendy to cut ties right before Marty departs for Mexico with Father Benitez and Nelson.
40	10	"You're the Boss"	Melissa Hickey	John Shiban	April 29, 2022
A flashback depicts Ben's final moments prior to his execution, where Ben realizes Wendy has abandoned him and Nelson is going to kill him. Before he dies, Ben asks Nelson to tell Wendy he forgives her. In the present, Marty arrives at Navarro's compound in Mexico and implements Navarro's plan to assert power over the cartel before Navarro's lieutenants can form a rival faction. Navarro survives an assassination attempt in prison, but is comatose. Marty analyzes the lieutenants' accounts and discovers Arturo has been skimming. Camila privately tells Marty that Arturo envied Javi's stature and likely ordered the attempt on Navarro's life. Marty has Arturo tortured, and he repeatedly denies responsibility before finally confessing to end his pain. Marty orders Arturo's execution and forces himself to watch as it is carried out. Ruth rejects Wendy's request to partner one time in supplying heroin to Shaw Medical. Wendy retaliates by persuading acting sheriff Ronnie Wycoff to investigate Ruth. Despite police surveillance, Ruth and Frank Jr. succeed in delivering Darlene's heroin to Shaw Medical. With no need for Wendy, Clare Shaw pulls her donations to the Byrdes' foundation. Wendy attempts to strong-arm Clare into reversing course.
41	11	"Pound of Flesh and Still Kickin'"	Laura Linney	Ning Zhou	April 29, 2022
Marty returns from Mexico and Wendy tells him someone is blocking their attempt to remove Navarro from the SDN list. Marty realizes that since Camila is the only one with whom he shared details of the extradition plan, she must be behind the attempt to kill Navarro and the effort to keep him on the list. Ruth visits Rachel in Miami and convinces her to join forces to take over the casino. Wendy rejects their offer, but Ruth learns that as Wyatt's legal guardian, she has claim to his estate, including Darlene's casino shares. Mel spots Nelson in security footage from the restaurant where Ben and Wendy were last seen, and Maya identifies Nelson as the cartel's enforcer. Without Marty's input, Wendy enlists Camila's help in forcing Clare to resume financing the Byrde foundation. Camila and the Byrdes visit Navarro and Wendy proposes Camila replace Marty as acting head of the cartel, which Navarro accepts. Marty does not trust Camila, but has no alternative but to agree. On the drive home, Marty's anger at Wendy for making decisions without him reaches a boiling point, and he beats another motorist in a road rage incident.
42	12	"Trouble the Water"	Amanda Marsalis	Paul Kolsby & Martin Zimmerman	April 29, 2022
Charlotte and Jonah post bail for Marty and Wendy. Ruth and Rachel offer to buy Charles Wilkes's casino shares in Rachel's name. Wilkes wants revenge on Wendy, so he readily agrees to sell. He also connects Ruth with a judge who has authority to expunge her criminal record, which would enable her to own the casino in her own name. Acting Sheriff Wycoff informs Ruth that someone has been arrested for Darlene and Wyatt's murders; Ruth visits him in jail and feels guilty for allowing him to be punished. Mel tells Nathan that Ben was likely killed by the cartel with Marty and Wendy's knowledge. Nathan petitions the family court to grant him custody so he can take Jonah and Charlotte to North Carolina. Marty and Wendy get Mel reinstated to the Chicago Police Department so he will be unavailable to testify for Nathan. Navarro objects to the delay in obtaining his release, and demands that Marty and Wendy produce results. Mel fails to appear to testify, but the judge rules that Jonah and Charlotte may decide where to live. They opt to live with Nathan, and Wendy desperately begs him to reconsider, but he refuses.
43	13	"Mud"	Amanda Marsalis	Miki Johnson	April 29, 2022
Marty discovers Ruth and Rachel have taken over the casino. He reminds Ruth that the casino is a cartel operation, but Ruth refuses to continue laundering money. Wendy has Nelson threaten Rachel, but Ruth holds firm. Wendy decides to make Camila the permanent head of the cartel despite Marty's objections. Camila agrees to make a deal with the FBI, but demands a final meeting with her brother. Navarro admits he did not have Javi killed. Jim tells Wendy that the foundation board now has a large roster of high-profile donors. She offers her father $2 million to leave the Ozarks without Jonah and Charlotte, but Nathan refuses. Wendy admits herself to a psychiatric hospital, claiming she has thoughts of killing her father. Ruth notices Nelson following her, and visits the police station, where she tells Wycoff the full story of Darlene and Wyatt's deaths to get Wycoff's suspect released. Upon exiting, she notices Nelson's car gone and realizes he is going to her trailer, where Rachel is staying. She calls Rachel with a warning, and Rachel retrieves a rifle and hides on the roof. She shoots and kills Nelson as soon as he arrives.
44	14	"A Hard Way to Go"	Jason Bateman	Chris Mundy	April 29, 2022
Ruth buries Nelson beneath the site of her new swimming pool. At Marty's urging, Ruth apologizes to Wendy for endangering Ben by getting him released from the mental hospital. Wendy apologizes for having Ruth's father killed. Ruth forces Nathan to admit to Jonah and Charlotte that he is taking them solely to spite Wendy. Jonah and Charlotte visit Wendy, who apologizes for her treatment of her family. Charlotte and Jonah decide to remain with their parents. On the way home from the hospital, the Byrdes survive a car accident. Navarro realizes Camila is targeting him and plots against her. Camila and the FBI meet with the Byrdes, Ruth, and Rachel to finalize their agreement. Camila arranges for Navarro's transfer to another prison, during which he is killed. At the Byrdes' fundraiser, Camila coerces Clare into admitting Ruth killed Javi, but Clare does not reveal the Byrdes' involvement. Camila blocks them from warning Ruth. When Ruth arrives home, Camila kills her. The Byrdes return home to find Mel broke in and recovered the cookie jar containing Ben's ashes. He vows to bring them to justice, but Jonah comes outside with a shotgun. The screen cuts to black as a shot is heard.

== Reception ==
Critical response of Ozark
Season	Rotten Tomatoes	Metacritic
1	70% (69 reviews)	66 (29 reviews)
2	76% (46 reviews)	59 (14 reviews)
3	98% (49 reviews)	77 (12 reviews)
4	85% (68 reviews)	78 (14 reviews) (part 1); 73 (14 reviews) (part 2)

=== Season 1 ===
On Rotten Tomatoes, the first season has an approval rating of 70% based on 69 reviews, with an average rating of 6.8/10. The website's critics consensus reads: "Ozark hasn't yet reached the same level as the classic crime dramas to which it will inevitably be compared, but its satisfyingly complex plot – and a gripping performance from Jason Bateman – suggest greater potential." On Metacritic, it has a weighted average score of 66 out of 100, based on 29 critics, indicating "generally favorable reviews".

Brian Lowry of CNN wrote, "While the fish-out-of-water concept is one of TV's oldest, Ozark carves out its own path with clever twists – including a late-in-the-run flashback explaining how the cartel came into his life – and the sheer strength of the performances." TV critic Sonia Saraiya of Variety wrote that Ozark is "smart, well-crafted, and says something," and that the series "comes together under Bateman's disarming and deceptively complex performance as Marty." Tim Dowling of The Guardian wrote "Laura Linney is, as ever, magnificent".

Alan Sepinwall of Uproxx was critical of the series' lack of humor (which he unfavorably compared to Breaking Bad) and failure to distinguish itself enough from numerous other contemporary shows about antiheroes, stating, "Your show needs something special to be worth the bother – particularly when too many shows are demanding too much patience from their viewers, with not enough reward – and Ozark doesn't really deliver the goods." Despite Sepinwall's negative assessment, however, he commended Julia Garner's performance as Ruth to be the series' highlight.

=== Season 2 ===
On Rotten Tomatoes, the second season has an approval rating of 76% based on 46 reviews, with an average rating of 6.6/10. The website's critics consensus reads: "Engaging and entertaining – if not particularly challenging – Ozark's descent into darker waters is kept afloat by another superb turn from Laura Linney." On Metacritic, it has a weighted average score of 59 out of 100, based on 14 critics, indicating "mixed or average reviews".

Alison Foreman of Mashable said the female characters are not just "emotional fodder" for the male characters, stating "Season 2 of Netflix's Ozark, however, champions female stories through all 10 of its episodes with an array of women that rivals the ensemble complexity of HBO's The Sopranos."

=== Season 3 ===
On Rotten Tomatoes, the third season has an approval rating of 98% based on 49 reviews, with an average rating of 8.2/10. The website's critics consensus reads: "Ozark finally finds its footing in a third season that ramps up the tension and shines a brighter spotlight on Laura Linney's exceptional performance." On Metacritic, it has a weighted average score of 77 out of 100, based on 12 critics, indicating "generally favorable reviews".

=== Season 4 ===
On Rotten Tomatoes, the fourth season has an approval rating of 85% based on 68 reviews, with an average rating of 7.8/10. The website's critics consensus reads: "Ozark hasn't gotten out clean just yet, but its mesmeric performances and taut suspense signal that the Byrde clan are as entertainingly resourceful as ever."

==== Part 1 ====
The first part of the season received a weighted average score of 78 out of 100 on Metacritic based on 14 critics, indicating "generally favorable reviews".

Critics praised part 1 of the fourth season for its writing, suspense, and performances, with many singling out Linney for praise. Brian Lowry of CNN praised showrunner Chris Mundy for "impressively navigat[ing] the story from one seemingly inescapable corner to the next," writing that the season "unfold[s] with a perpetual sense of dread." Stuart Jeffries of The Guardian gave part 1 five out of five stars, praising Linney's "chilling" performance and comparing Wendy's arc to Lady Macbeth. Nandini Balial of RogerEbert.com praised the additions of Damian Young and Adam Rothenberg to the main cast, and felt Garner's performance as Ruth "will go down in history as one of the finest ever seen on television or streaming services."

Ben Travers of IndieWire similarly praised Linney, describing her performance as "bristling" and "mesmerizing", but felt that the first half of the season was "somewhat predictable" and that its suspense was "diminished by [being] Part 1." Daniel D'Addario of Variety was more mixed: he felt the series' pleasures "solely exist in the realm of plot development – or, perhaps, plot intensification," describing the first half of the season as "all incident, little drama." However, he too praised Linney – calling the character of Wendy one of the series' "few intriguing inventions" – as well as Garner, whose performance he felt was characterized by an "outsized bleakness."

==== Part 2 ====
The second part of the season received a weighted average score of 73 out of 100 on Metacritic based on 14 critics, indicating "generally favorable reviews".

=== Cultural impact ===
In November 2017, it was reported that the series helped increase tourism and notoriety of the Lake of the Ozarks, but did not have a significant economic impact. In February 2018, a restaurant named "Marty Byrde's" opened in Lake Ozark, Missouri, and includes menu items inspired by the show, including "Ruth's Smoked Wings".
