= Puerta 7 =

2020 Spanish language television series

- Genre: Crime; Drama; Thriller
- Created by: Martin Zimmerman
- Starring: Dolores Fonzi; Esteban Lamothe; Carlos Belloso
- Country of origin: Argentina
- Original language: Spanish
- No. of seasons: 1
- No. of episodes: 8

Production
- Running time: 35-45 minutes

Original release
- Network: Netflix
- Release: 21 February 2020

Puerta 7 is an Argentinian crime drama thriller television series created by Martin Zimmerman and starring Dolores Fonzi, Esteban Lamothe and Carlos Belloso. The plot revolves around football fans dealing drugs and causing fatalities at football matches.

It premiered on Netflix on February 21, 2020.

== Cast ==
- Dolores Fonzi as Diana
- Esteban Lamothe as Fabián
- Juan Gil Navarro as Santiago
- Carlos Belloso as Héctor "Lomito" Baldini
- Antonio Grimau as Guillermo
- Daniel Aráoz as Cardozo
- Ignacio Quesada as Mario
- Daniel Valenzuela as Mario father
- Marcelo Rodriguez as "el Gitano"
- Lautaro Rodríguez as Gabriel "el Tucu" Fuantes
- Melissa Giostra as Paula Baldini

== Release ==
Puerta 7 was released on 21 February 2020 on Netflix.
