= Martin Zimmerman =

American bilingual playwright

Martín Zimmerman

Martín Zimmerman is an American bilingual (English and Spanish) playwright.

Zimmerman grew up speaking both languages. He attended Duke University, graduating with a BS summa cum laude in theater studies and economics. He later attended University of Texas at Austin and received a MFA in playwriting.

== Works ==
=== Plays ===
- Teen Superhero Squad (Note: Date of production/completion unknown.)
- The Trial of Winter (2008) (Note: Produced by Maryland National Capital Parks and Planning Commission in the summer of 2008.)
- Three Movements (2008) (Note: Ran from October 17–26, 2008 at Studio Theatre, Theatre Row under the direction of Maura Farver.)
- The Making of a Modern Folk Hero (2011) (Note: First ran in June of 2011 at The Source Festival under the direction of Catherine Tripp; then ran from September 29 – October 29, 2017 at Chicago Dramatists under the direction of Kelly Howe.)
- In the Event of Capture (co-written with Rebecca Stevens, < 2013) (Note: Received a reading at LCT3 in New York.)
- White Tie Ball (2013) (Note: Ran from September 6 – October 13, 2013 at Teatro Vista under the direction of Edward Torres.)
- Seven Spots on the Sun (2013) (Note: Ran from September 28 – October 27, 2013 at Cincinnati Playhouse In The Park under the direction of KJ Sanchez.)
- The Solid Sand Below (2013) (Note: Ran from December 8–22, 2013 at Goodman Theatre under the direction of Jonathan Berry.)
- Coffee, Olive and Everything Between (short play, < 2014)
- Foreign Tongue (short play, < 2014)
- Let Me Count the Ways (2014-2015) (Note: Received readings at La Jolla Playhouse on Monday, February 17, 2014, Philadelphia Theatre Company in spring 2014, and New York Theatre Workshop in 2015 (directed by May Adrales). The Philadelphia Theatre Company resulted in Zimmerman being awarded the Terrence McNally New Play Award on May 7, 2014.)
- Stranger (working title)
- On the Exhale (2017) (Note: Ran from February 7 – April 2, 2017 at Roundabout Underground Theatre under the direction of Leigh Silverman.)
- Simona's Search (2024) (Note: Ran from January 18 – February 11, 2024 at Connecticut's Hartford Stage under the direction of Melia Bensussen.)

=== Television ===
- Narcos (2015, staff writer for Season 1)
- Blood & Oil (2015, staff writer for Season 1)
- Ozark (2017-2022, writer and supervising producer)
- Puerta 7 (2020, creator and writer)
- Surface (2022, writer of 1 episode)

== Recognition ==
- Terrence McNally New Play Award
- Steinberg/ATCA New Play Award Citation
- Humanitas Prize New Voices Award 2013
- McKnight Advancement Grant 2013
- Sky Cooper New American Play Prize 2013
- Carl Djerassi Playwriting Fellowship
- National New Play Network Smith Prize
- Alliance of Latino Theater Artists (ALTA) Artist of the Month

== Venues ==
- Goodman Theater- Chicago, IL
- Cincinnati Playhouse In the Park- Cincinnati, OH
- Oregon Shakespeare Festival- Ashland, OR
- La Jolla Playhouse- San Diego, CA
- Roundabout Underground- NYC, NY
- New York Theatre Workshop- NYC, NY
- Victory Gardens Theater- Chicago, IL
- Philadelphia Theatre Company- Philadelphia, PA
- Marin Theatre Company- San Francisco, CA
- The Playwrights' Center- Minneapolis, MN
- Alliance Theatre- Atlanta, GA
- A.C.T. (Seattle)
- PlayPenn- Philadelphia, PA
- Icicle Creek Theatre Festival- Leavenworth, WA
- American Theater Company- Chicago, IL
- The Theatre @ Boston Court
- Chicago Dramatists
- Primary Stages- NYC, NY
- Teatro Vista- Chicago, IL
- Seven Devils Playwrights Conference
- Illinois Shakespeare Festival- Bloomington, IL
- Borderlands Theater - Tucson, AZ
- Source Festival- Washington DC
- The Gift Theatre- Chicago, IL
- Duke University- Durham, NC
- The University of Texas- Austin
- Red Tape Theatre- Chicago, IL
