= Dorismar =

Argentine actress (born 1975)

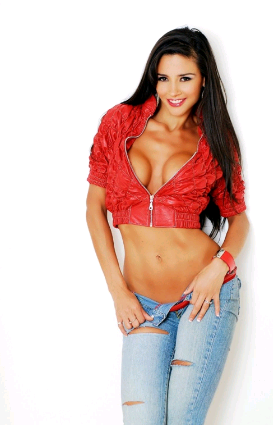
- Born: Dora Noemí Kerchen; March 15, 1975 (age 51); Buenos Aires, Argentina
- Other name: Doris Mar
- Occupations: Model, actress, television hostess, singer
- Years active: 2000-present
- Spouse: Alejandro Schiff (?-present)
- Children: Renata Schiff Kerchen (b. 2012)
- Website: www.dorismar.net

Dorismar (born Dora Noemí Kerchen on March 15, 1975) is an Argentine model, actress, television hostess, and singer. She was born in Buenos Aires, Argentina.

== Acting career ==
Dorismar has worked as an actress in Argentina and in Miami. She appeared on the cover of Playboy, representing The Sexy Ladies of Latin TV, in March 2003. In August 2004 she also appeared on the cover of Open Your Eyes. She was a hostess on the Univisión Network television show Caliente from 2000 to 2006. Currently, she stars in Televisa's sketch comedy series Desmadruga2. Dorismar is also in Televisa's Mexican telenovela Triunfo Del Amor which is a remake of the telenovela Privilegio De Amar (1998).

Dorismar later became an OnlyFans creator, and in 2022 was reported to have made millions of dollars on her OnlyFans account.

== Environmental work ==
In 2005, Dorismar posed for provocative posters distributed in Mexico aimed at protecting endangered sea turtle eggs from being harvested by people who believe they are a source of virility, proclaiming "My man does not need turtle eggs because he knows that they don't make him more potent", and "Sea turtle eggs DO NOT increase sexual potency!" These advertisements drew some derision from women's rights groups, and several environmental groups refused to be associated with the campaign.

== Deportation ==
On January 5, 2006, Dorismar and her husband/manager Alejandro (Alex) Schiff were deported from the United States to Argentina as undocumented people after living six years in Miami. Dorismar contested the deportation, claiming that her physical attributes place her in the category of "alien of extraordinary ability", which would allow her to seek an O-1 visa, permitting her residency in the U.S. based on her talents. She was unsuccessful in her petition.
