= You Are the One (Argentine TV series) =

2006 Argentine romantic comedy television series

- The main characters, Natalia Oreiro and Facundo Arana
- Genre: Drama; Humor; Romance; Comedy
- Created by: Adrián Suar
- Written by: Ernesto Korovsky; Sebastián Parrotta
- Directed by: Rodolfo Antúnez; Jorge Bechara
- Starring: Natalia Oreiro; Facundo Arana; Carla Peterson; Carlos Belloso; Mónica Ayos
- Theme music composer: Miriam Alejandra Bianchi (Gilda) performed by Natalia Oreiro
- Opening theme: "Corazon Valiente"
- Ending theme: "Corazon Valiente"
- Composer: Miriam Alejandra Bianchi
- Country of origin: Argentina
- Original language: Spanish
- No. of episodes: 230

Production
- Executive producer: Adrián González
- Producers: Mariana Petraglia; Julieta Martinelli
- Production locations: Buenos Aires, Argentina
- Cinematography: Pablo Storino; Jorge Fernández
- Editors: Alejandro Alem; Alejandro Parysow
- Running time: 60 minutes

Original release
- Network: El Trece
- Release: 16 January 2006 – 9 January 2007

You Are the One (Spanish: Sos mi vida, lit.: "You Are My Life") is a 2006 Argentine romantic comedy television series, directed by Rodolfo Antúnez and Jorge Bechara and broadcast by El Trece between 16 January 2006, and 9 January 2007. It is the second telenovela starring Facundo Arana and Natalia Oreiro as lead actors. The production included many location shootings, even during the 2006 FIFA World Cup in Germany, and many guest stars.

The plot follows the love story of Martín Quesada, an affluent businessman, and Esperanza Muñoz, a struggling female boxer who becomes his personal assistant. During its broadcast its overall rating averaged 26.9 points. It was critically acclaimed, and won four Martín Fierro Awards and three Clarín Awards. It was sold to more than 40 countries and had remakes in Mexico, Poland and Portugal.

== Premise ==
The telenovela was produced by Pol-ka based on a premise by Adrián Suar, which he formulated nearly six months before the show's premiere, after discussion with his partner Javier Blanco y Tevah. The premise involves a rich businessman and former Formula 1 racing driver who falls in love with a poor woman looking for work in his emporium. Suar requested scripts from Ernesto Korovsky and Sebastian Parrotta, the authors of Gasoleros and El sodero de mi vida, and Hombres de honor and Padre Coraje respectively. The program was directed by Daniel De Felippo and Rodolfo Antúnez and produced by César Markus González. Most of the filming was done in the Pol-ka studio at the Colegiales neighborhood, using outdoor scenes unconventional for the genre.

The telenovela features Facundo Arana and Natalia Oreiro, who both appeared in the successful telenovela Muñeca Brava, as lead actors. The relationship between the two was more than professional; Facundo Arana had spontaneously been offered a guest appearance on the Russian series A ritmo de tango starring Oreiro. Both actors agreed to appear in You Are the One on the condition that they worked together. As a result, the program design was decided only after both were confirmed in the leading roles. Oreiro delayed filming proposals in Israel, Spain, and Uruguay, and the recording of her fourth music album to join the project. As in Muñeca Brava, the narrative of You Are the One revolves around a wealthy suitor and a poor woman, but unlike the former program it does not concentrate all the characters on a single narrative context. You Are the One organizes two contexts for both the rich and the poor, each one with its own characteristic locations and supporting characters.

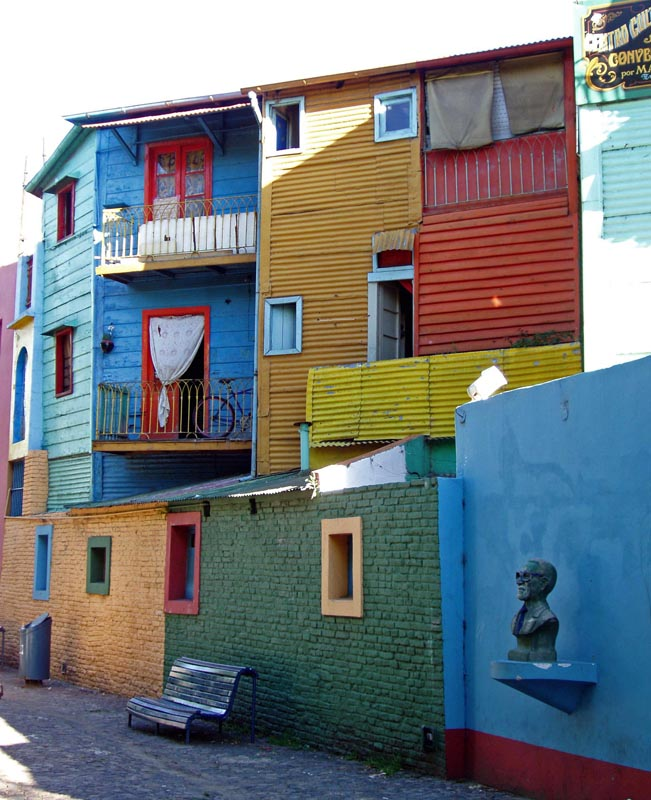
Houses of La Boca neighbourhood, with their characteristic style. The tenement of the series was modeled after it.

Natalia Oreiro plays Esperanza Muñoz, a female boxer nicknamed "La Monita". Oreiro was inspired by the singer Gilda to outline the character's personality. The main location is a tenement in the neighborhood of La Boca where Esperanza lives with other characters. Her adoptive mother Nieves lives with Enrique "Quique" Ferreti, her natural son and Esperanza's childhood boyfriend. The writers drafted Quique's general outlines; Belloso defined most of his personality, including the relationship with Esperanza—which is halfway between engagement and brotherhood—and his Oedipus complex with his mother. Esperanza trains as a boxer in a neighbourhood gymnasium with Quique, who has a wrestling gimmick as "Commander Ray". Other main characters in the series are actress Nilda Yadhur, known as "The Turk", and Paraguayan janitor Kimberly.

The character of Martín Quesada establishes a context of wealthy characters. Quesada is a businessman and Formula 1 driver, but is not presented as selfish or greedy as is the archetype of entrepreneurs in soap operas. The two locations associated with him are the Quesada Group office, presided over by him, and his home. The office has the characters of Quesada's chief adviser Alfredo Uribe, the secretary Mercedes, and his cousin Miguel Quesada, who serves as vice-president, and the lawyer Felix Perez Garmendia. His girlfriend Constanza Insua and his cousin Debbie are also included. Martín lives with his housekeeper Rosa, Rosa's grandson Tony, and three adopted orphan siblings, José, Laura, and Coqui. Another recurring site is the apartment of Miguel and Debbie, which would be also used as the house of Constanza or Garmendia if needed.

== Plot ==
Supporting characters of the telenovela. From left to right: Alfredo Uribe (Alejandro Awada), Mercedes (Claudia Fontán), Enrique "Quique" Ferreti (Carlos Belloso), Constanza Inzúa (Carla Peterson) and Miguel Quesada (Marcelo Mazzarello)

The story begins during a boxing match of Esperanza Muñoz—nicknamed "Monita"—who has sustained a hand injury. Her manager, Enrique "Quique" Ferreti, is pressuring her to continue fighting, despite her pain. This injury complicates her economic situation, as her boxing provides the only income for her adoptive family, namely Quique and his mother, Maria de las Nieves. Nieves loves Esperanza like her own daughter, and pressures her to marry Quique. Her neighbor Kimberly suggests that Esperanza apply for a job in the Quesada Group, where she works as a janitress. The secretary Mercedes rejects Esperanza due to her violent manners and her dressing style. Martín Quesada, the president of the company, sees Esperanza crying in the street and hires her as his personal assistant.

Martín also meets three orphan siblings, José, Laura, and Coqui, who resisted being adopted by different families. He takes them to his home, and starts the legal proceedings to adopt them. Martín begins to like Esperanza, but his girlfriend Constanza, a cold, manipulative, and malicious woman, is wary of her. Esperanza does not tell Martín about her relations with Quique, instead pretending to be his sister. She also does not tell Martín that she is a boxer. Quique and Constanza begin their own relationship, unknown by most other characters. Martín breaks off his relationship with Esperanza when he sees her goodbye kiss with Quique, as he realizes that she was lying to him.

After the breakup with Esperanza, Martín resumes his romance with Constanza and eventually proposes marriage to her, in order to improve his chances of winning custody of the three siblings. The judge, who thought that Esperanza was a bad influence on the children, gives the adoption to Constanza instead of Martín, forcing him to marry her. Their marriage proves difficult; Constanza is demanding and possessive, and despises the adopted siblings, who hate her as well. Martín finally breaks with Constanza when she pretends to be blind to keep him with her. The children's custody battle delays the divorce, as Martín wants to keep them.

Due to the efforts of Martín's cousin Miguel, the unscrupulous lawyer "Falucho", and Constanza, Martin gradually loses his fortune, his business, and his house. He moves to the Conventillo and works as a taxi driver. Eventually, he recovers everything. A new character, Bárbara, temporarily joins the love triangle of Martín, Esperanza, and Constanza. Constanza gets pregnant by Quique and tries to pass off her son as Martín's, but fails. Martín finally marries Esperanza and has a family with her and the adopted children. Constanza moves in with Quique.

== Production ==
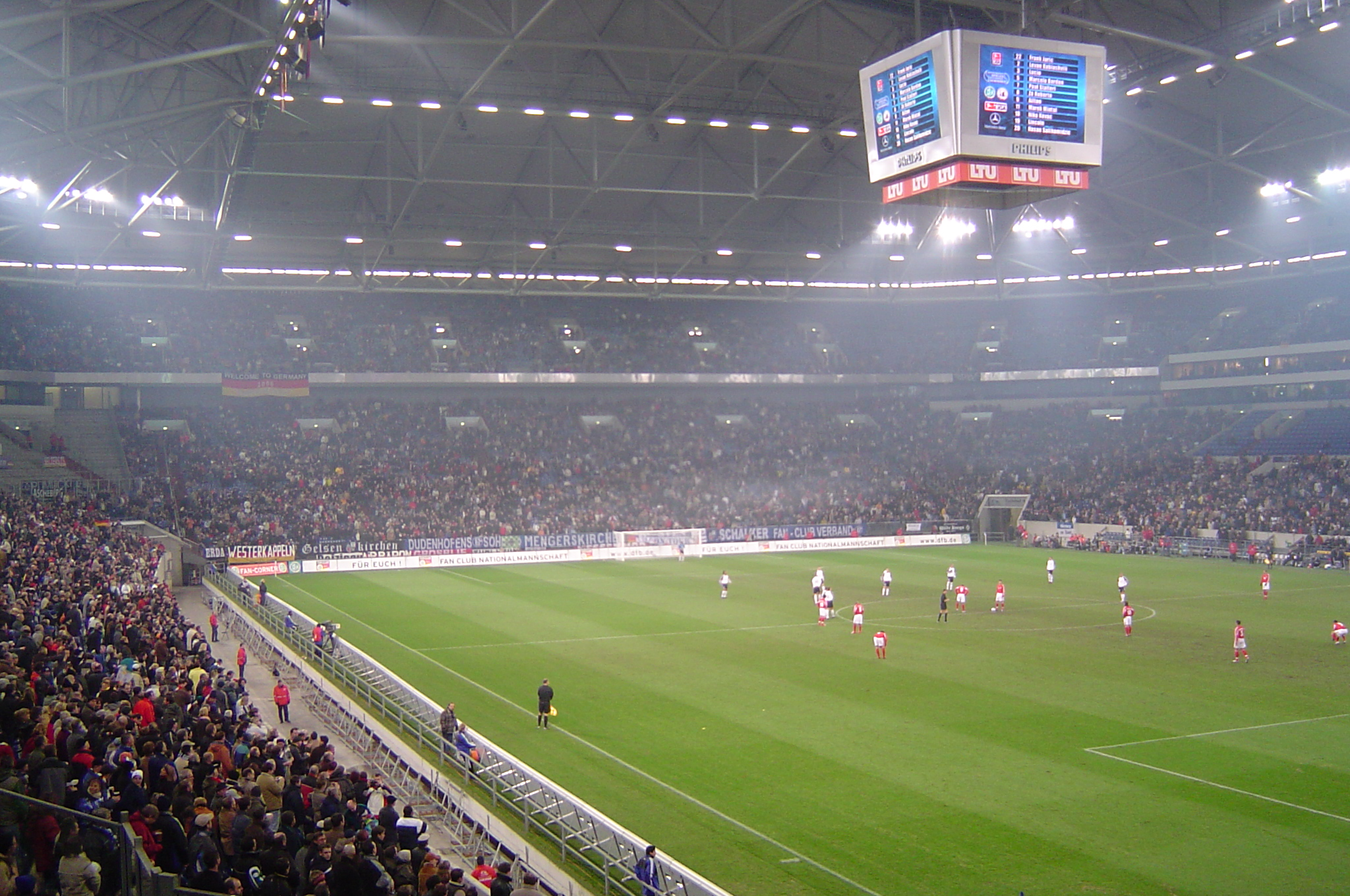
The Veltins-Arena stadium. An episode featured location shooting during the Argentina-Serbia and Montenegro match of the 2006 FIFA World Cup.

The program was directed by Daniel De Felippo and Rodolfo Antúnez, and produced by César Markus González. Most of the filming occurred at the headquarters of Pol-ka in the Colegiales neighborhood. The telenovela took several risks in the creative and production fields, which were mostly successful. The choice of Martín Quesada's background as a Formula 1 driver required an area with a large infrastructure to represent realistic races. For realism, plot scenes set outside Buenos Aires were actually filmed outside the city. There was significant press coverage during the location shooting in Germany, which took place during the 2006 FIFA World Cup. Facundo Arana and Natalia Oreiro played their characters in the Veltins-Arena stadium during the Argentina-Serbia and Montenegro match. The result of the match—a 6–0 Argentine victory—benefited the filming, and the episode received 31.5 rating points. Location shooting also occurred in the tourist ski resort Las Leñas in the Andes. A simulated aircraft crash that left the characters in a jungle was filmed at the Pereyra Iraola park and an Argentine Air Force park in Morón.

To make her performances as a female boxer look realistic, Oreiro trained regularly with the renowned boxer Marcela Acuña and her coach Ramón Chaparro. They taught Oreiro how to stand and move in the ring and how to make various types of strokes, and she underwent cardiovascular and weight training. Acuña commented that Oreiro mastered the basic techniques more quickly than most beginner boxers. For this training, Oreiro temporarily gave up her vegetarian diet. Another plot required the characters to fly a Piper Tomahawk airplane and make an emergency landing. This was risky filming, and Arana and Oreiro did not use stunt doubles for it. The scene, which was the first of its kind in a daily Argentine telenovela, required four professional pilots, five special effects experts, and two additional aircraft used for filming the main aircraft from the outside. Arana was advised by the pilot Alberto Di Giorgio.

The program's opening theme is Gilda's "Corazón Valiente" (Spanish: Braveheart), sung by Oreiro. It was produced by Toti Gimenez, widower and producer of the late Gilda. Oreiro is a fan of Gilda and chose this song as a homage to mark the 10th anniversary of her death. She considered including it in her next music CD, but did not record anything afterwards.

=== Guest actors ===
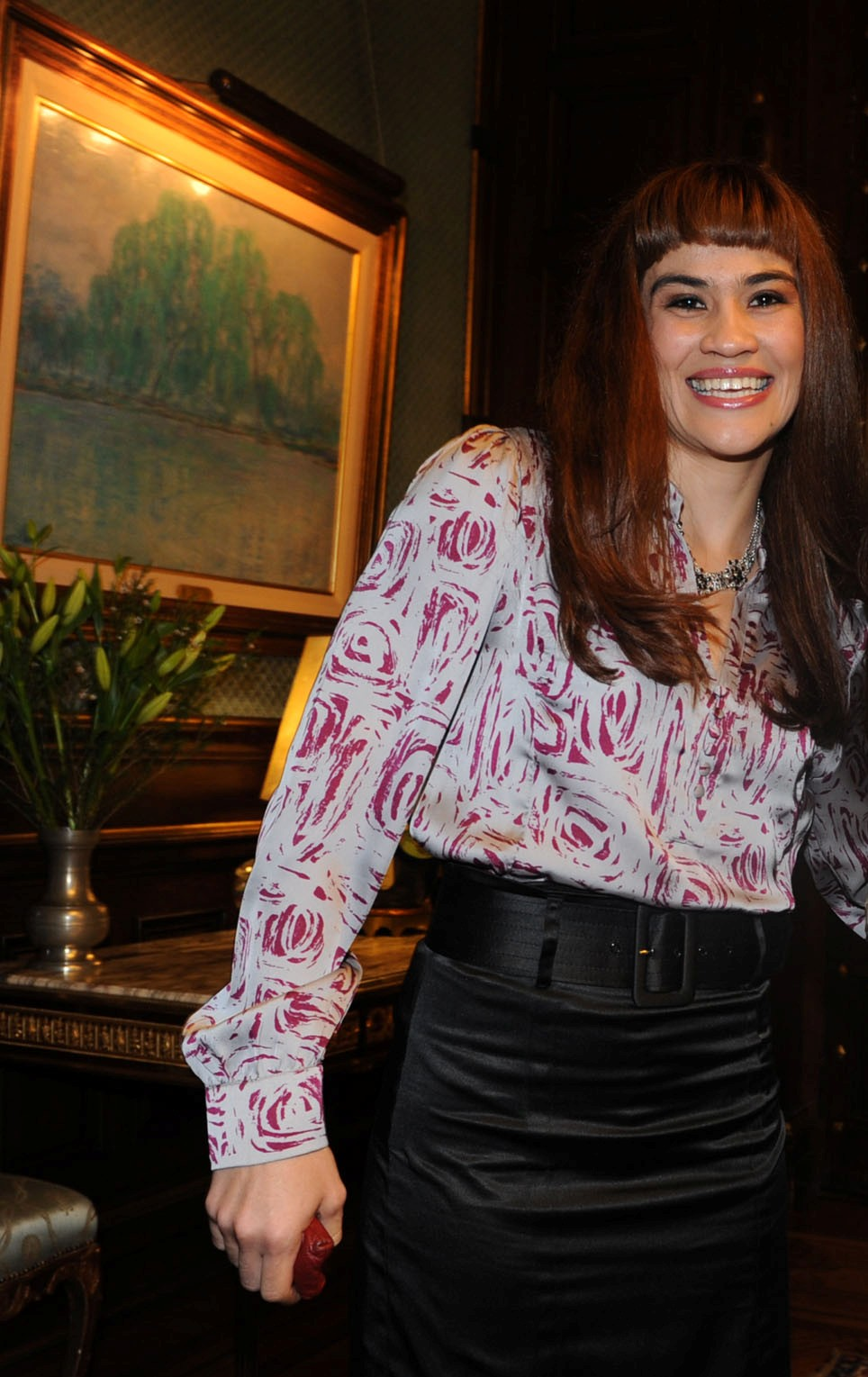
The boxer Marcela Acuña trained Natalia Oreiro and appeared as a guest star in the show.

The program featured several guest stars, who appeared in secondary or support roles in several episodes. Some guest stars—such as the singers Chayanne, Ricky Martin and Julieta Venegas—played themselves within the fiction of the program. Venegas' song "Tu Nombre" is used as a background song in romantic settings. Marcela Acuña appeared twice, playing herself in a match against Oreiro's character. The appearance of actress Leticia Brédice was nominated for the "best cameo in fiction" category at the Martín Fierro Awards; the prize was given to Nora Cárpena. Actress Reina Reech delayed other projects to take part in the program.

=== Narration ===
The program expanded the usual conventions of the genre by using several types of metafiction, referencing the actors themselves or the nature of the program. An example within the plot is Sos mi muqui, a program within the program whose characters were based on the show's main characters. The actors' former characters are occasionally referenced in plots that place them in similar contexts than those of older fictions. Martín infiltrated a convent using a habit similar to the one Arana's character in Padre Coraje wore, and Esperanza wore clothes similar to those Oreiro's character in Muñeca Brava wore when they had to get into a slum.

Many actors played minor characters as well as their main roles. Pablo Cedrón played a Paraguayan brother of his character Falucho; both characters were involved in a love triangle with Kimberly. Carlos Belloso was cast as Quique's lost sister, dressed as a woman. Natalia Oreiro, who speaks Russian fluently, took the role of a Russian princess. Facundo Arana played a criminal, a role unlike Martín. Those scenes did not use special effects; each character was filmed separately without the two characters sharing the screen. The hero of the telenovela marries the villain, contrary to the genre's usual convention in which such a wedding is interrupted or canceled at the last moment.

== Cast ==
Actor	Character	Description
Natalia Oreiro	Esperanza Muñoz/"la monita"	A poor female boxer
Facundo Arana	Martín Quesada	Formula One driver and businessman, president of the "Quesada Group"
Carla Peterson	Constanza Inzúa/"la momia"	Socialite girlfriend of Martín Quesada
Carlos Belloso	Enrique "Quique" Ferreti	Boyfriend and adoptive brother of Esperanza
Fabiana García Lago	Kimberly	Paraguayan janitor
Mónica Ayos	Nilda Yadhur/"la turca"	Unemployed actress
Dalma Milebo	María de las Nieves	Mother of Quique, adoptive mother of Esperanza
Griselda Siciliani	Débora "Debbie" Quesada	Simple-minded cousin of Martín
Marcelo Mazzarello	Miguel Quesada	Evil cousin of Martín
Pablo Cedrón	Félix Pérez Garmendia/"Falucho"	Evil lawyer
Alejandro Awada	Alfredo Uribe	Assistant of Martín
Claudia Fontán	Mercedes	Secretary of the Quesada Group
Elías Viñoles	Jose	Adoptive son of Martín
Thelma Fardin	Laura	Adoptive daughter of Martín
Ornella Fazio	Coqui	Adoptive daughter of Martín
Adela Gleijer	Rosa	Housekeeper of Martín
Nicolás D'Agostino	Tony	Grandson of Rosa
Mike Amigorena	Rolando Martínez	Rival driver of Martín

== Reception ==
=== Ratings ===
The program was first broadcast in January, a month of low television activity in Argentina because of the summer vacations. Nevertheless, it was highly successful. The competitor channel Telefe aired the teen comedy Alma Pirata, which was rescheduled because of its low ratings, and replaced it with the second season of Casados con Hijos. Both programs had similar ratings until the end of Casados con Hijos in August. With an average rating of 26.8 points, Sos mi vida ended as the most watched Argentine television fiction so far; it was displaced by the 2009, telenovela Valientes, which received 27.3 rating points.

In September 2007, a clip of the series posted on the first official telenovela channel on YouTube, by the production company Dori Media, attracted more viewers than any other YouTube clip that month.

=== Awards ===
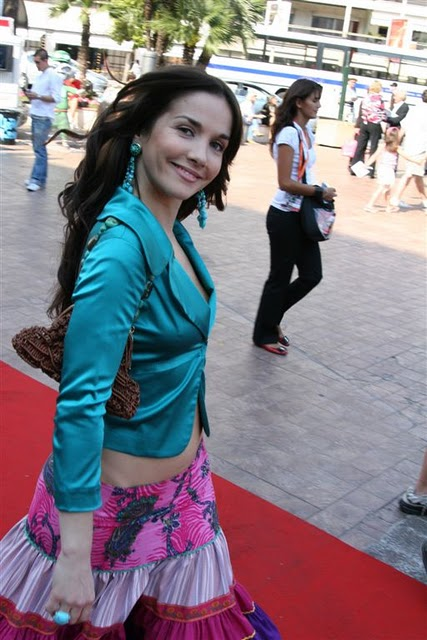
Natalia Oreiro received the Martín Fierro Award for her work.

The program was awarded the best TV comedy at the 2006 ceremony of the Martín Fierro Awards, prevailing over Casados con hijos and ¿Quién es el Jefe?. Facundo Arana received the award for best lead actor in comedy, prevailing over Guillermo Francella, Humberto Tortonese, and Nicolás Vázquez. Natalia Oreiro won the award for the best lead actress in comedy, prevailing over Florencia Peña, Nancy Duplaá, Carmen Barbieri, and Andrea Bonelli. Alejandro Awada, Marcelo Mazzarello, and Carlos Belloso received nominations for supporting comedy actor awards, which was won by Belloso. Similarly, three of five nominations for supporting comedy actress went to Carla Peterson, Mónica Ayos and Claudia Fontán, but the award went to Érika Rivas of Casados con hijos. The program was unsuccessfully nominated for best theme song and best guest appearance for Leticia Brédice.

Facundo Arana and Natalia Oreiro were nominated again at the 2007 Martín Fierro Awards. These nominations proved controversial because the program only lasted for a week in 2007, and had no second season, and both actors took a recess from work after it. Neither of them received an award for those nominations. Oreiro won the newly created award for the best dressed actress of the night, which is not part of the official awards.

At the Clarín Awards ceremony in late 2006, the program was awarded for the best comedy, prevailing over Casados con hijos and Alma Pirata. Elías Viñoles won the award for best actor, Ornella Fazio was nominated for best female actor; the award was given to María Abadi of Montecristo. Unlike the Martín Fierro, the Clarín awards do not distinguish between lead and supporting actors. Belloso was awarded as best comedy actor; Oreiro was nominated and the award was given to Érika Rivas.

=== Critical reception ===
The Clarín newspaper attributes the success of the program to the actors' performances, the subplots, production initiatives, and the original treatment of stories. The work of the supporting cast was also praised, including Carla Peterson, Fabiana Garcia Lago, and Marcelo Mazzarello. The newspaper La Nación praised the show's mix of sitcom humor and telenovela drama, and equated the dramatic episodes to the works of renowned telenovela authors Abel Santa Cruz, Alberto Migré, and Delia Fiallo.

The program was criticized for the length of time—nearly three months—before the lead couple's first kiss. Clarín also criticized a badly-performed striptease act by Facundo Arana. As Carlos Belloso could not go with Arana and Oreiro to the filming at the World Cup, he was filmed in the Plaza San Martín, pretending that he was in Germany as well.

The program's scheduled broadcast time was 21:00, but the channel often delayed its broadcast by up to 40 minutes. This led to conflicts with other channels and COMFER, the institution that regulates Argentine television. The last episode lasted for half an hour and was followed by the premiere of the new telenovela Son de Fierro; La Nación said that the final episode should have lasted a full hour.

== Airings and remakes ==
The program was initially aired in Argentina in 2006 on El Trece at prime time. Following the success of the initial run, El Trece and Volver reran the show. It is sold internationally by the Dori Media Group under the English name "You Are The One" to more than 40 countries.

The concept of the program was sold as well, and some countries remade the telenovela with local actors. The Mexican version, Un gancho al corazón, starred Danna García, Sebastián Rulli, Laisha Wilkins, and Raul Araiza. The characters were renamed, but García's character retained the sobriquet "La Monita". The Polish version, Prosto w serce, starred Anna Mucha, Filip Bobek, and Małgorzata Socha. The Portuguese version, Deixa-me amar, starred Paulo Pires and Paula Lobo Antunes.
