= Deixa-me amar =

2007 Portuguese telenovela

Deixa-me amar was a 2007 Portuguese telenovela, based in the Argentine telenovela You Are the One. The main actors were Paula Lobo Antunes as Lara Guerra (a female boxer) and Paulo Pires as businessman Martim Botelho.
