= Carlos Belloso =

Argentine actor

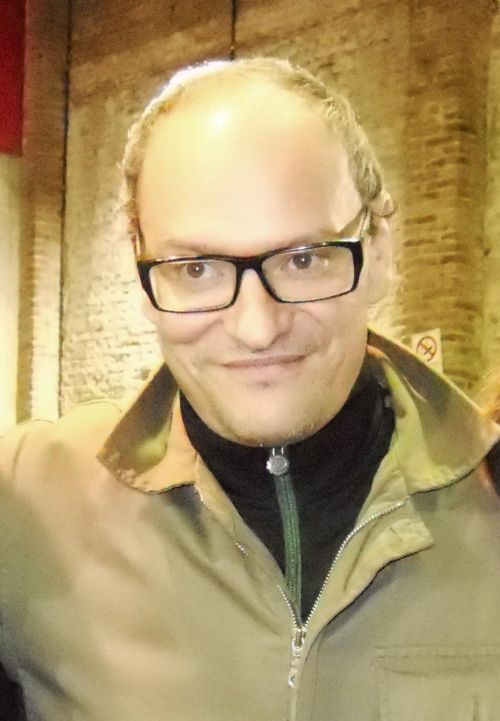

Carlos Belloso (born April 5, 1963, Vicente López) is an Argentine actor. He has worked in Pol-Ka telenovelas such as Campeones de la vida, You Are the One and Los únicos. He played the Green Goblin in the Argentine adaptation of the Spider-Man musical.

== Awards ==
- 2013 Tato award as best acting in a single episode (for Historia clínica)
