= El Sistema USA =

Music education network in the USA

- National Alliance of El Sistema-Inspired Programs
- Formation: 2014
- Type: Nonprofit
- Headquarters: Durham, North Carolina, USA
- Website: https://elsistemausa.org

El Sistema USA, also known as National Alliance of El Sistema-Inspired Programs, is a national network of music education programs inspired by Venezuela's El Sistema model. It originated in 2009 as an initiative at the New England Conservatory and was incorporated as an independent nonprofit organization based in Durham, North Carolina, in 2014.

In 2025, its network included over 140 member programs serving more than 30,000 young people across the United States and Canada. El Sistema USA supports its members through professional development, providing assistance for emerging programs by training, mentoring, financial support, and administrative guidance. Its activities are aimed at using ensemble-based music education to promote social development, including among youth from underserved communities.

The philosophy and aspirations of El Sistema USA are expressed on their website as:

"We envision a world in which every child — regardless of income, geography, or identity — has access to a high-quality music education program that builds community, opportunity, and personal growth. Our model emphasizes programs with free or low-cost tuition, frequent instruction (5-10+ hours per week), and ensemble-based learning."

== History ==
Following the founder of El Sistema, José Abreu's 2009 TED Prize, TED funded the Sistema Fellows Program at the New England Conservatory. In this five-year program, 50 young musicians received instruction in conducting and directing youth orchestras across the United States. Special importance was given to leadership and community development, and the program included a month‐long residency to become familiar with El Sistema in Venezuela. The program ran from 2009 to 2014, with graduates later taking up artistic and management positions at music education programs, including the Corona Youth Music Project in Queens, New York, New West Symphony Harmony Project in Ventura, California, and Music for Youth in Cincinnati, Ohio.

Conductor Gustavo Dudamel, himself a graduate of Venezuela's original El Sistema and later principal conductor of the Los Angeles Philharmonic, played a key role in adapting the El Sistema model to the United States. His advocacy and personal story helped inspire the creation of the Youth Orchestra Los Angeles (YOLA) in 2007, a free after-school orchestra program targeting underserved communities in Los Angeles and regarded as one of the first U.S.-based implementations of the El Sistema philosophy. Since 2009, the year Dudamel began his tenure with the LA Philharmonic, the project has been considered as an exemple for musical education in the U.S.

According to the official website of El Sistema USA^{®} (ESUSA), the network began as a program at New England Conservatory in 2009. The organisation was formally incorporated as a nonprofit in 2014.

== Activities ==
In 2025, El Sistema USA reported that its network included over 140 member programs, involving approximately 6,000 teaching artists and 25,000 students. The organization supports these programs through professional development, research and data initiatives, student-leadership opportunities, and field advocacy. Its work is guided by a commitment to equitable access to music education, promoting a model that typically offers free or low-cost participation, frequent weekly instruction, and ensemble-based learning. They participate by networking and sharing experiences for teacher training, curricula for music students, collecting data and advocacy.

ESUSA has been helping new programs by offering financial assistance, shared training, mentoring, and administrative guidance. It also aims to strengthen long-term viability by fostering donor development and creative fundraising efforts, all with the goal of using music education and ensemble playing to build key life skills among young people independent of their social background. As part of its networking activities, ESUSA has reported on their National Symposiums, a Youth Ambassadors Program as well as regional meetings, sponsored by grants from the National Endowment for the Arts.

In 2024, ESUSA introduced A Musician's Guide to Reaching for the Stars, a free online curriculum created in partnership with classically trained violinist and astronaut Sarah Gillis and the Polaris Program. The resource was designed for teachers, students, and families, using music as an entry point for exploring STEM concepts while emphasizing creativity, curiosity, and social-emotional learning. According to ESUSA, the guide forms part of a broader educational outreach effort associated with the Polaris Dawn mission and aims to inspire young learners by providing connections between artistic practice and scientific discovery.

During the Polaris Dawn space mission Sarah Gillis performed a concert in the Crew Dragon capsule alongside El Sistema music students from countries including Brazil, Haiti, Sweden, Uganda, USA, and Venezuela. She played the solo violin part of Rey's Theme by John Williams from the 2015 film Star Wars: The Force Awakens to raise money for St. Jude Children's Research Hospital in Memphis, Tennessee, and ESUSA. The video of the performance was the first of its kind to be transmitted from space using Starlink's high-speed internet connection.

Starting in the 2026–27 academic year, ESUSA and the Manhattan School of Music (MSM) have announced a partnership to create the El Sistema USA® Scholarship at MSM. This will offer eligible students from ESUSA member programs in the United States and Canada a Bachelor-level scholarship covering up to full tuition.

Sistema Canada is a national organization that brings together ESI music education programs across Canada. With 20 member programs across the country in 2025, Sistema Canada is administered in partnership with the New Brunswick Youth Orchestra, a registered Canadian charity. The members of Sistema Canada are also members of El Sistema USA.

== Sistema Global ==
According to their websites, Sistema Global and El Sistema USA are distinct but complementary parts of the international ESI system: Sistema Global serves as a global connector and resource hub, aiming to unite El Sistema programs and practitioners across countries. El Sistema USA operates as a regional network that supports, standardizes, and advocates for El Sistema-style music education in North America.

== Selected ESI-programs in the U.S. and Canada ==
Names, basic information and links for over 140 member programs are listed in ESUSA's member directory. Some of their members include the following local programs in alphabetical order:

=== USA ===
In Atlanta, Georgia, the Atlanta Music Project (AMP) has been sponsored by major companies and foundations of the city. It is managed by two Sistema Fellows, graduates of the 2010 and 2012 Fellowship program at the New England Conservatory of Music. The project offers both an orchestral and a choral music program. In 2024, its Senior Youth Choir won the O4 Youth Choirs category at the World Choir Games in the Open Competition in Auckland, New Zealand, earning a Golden Diploma Level VI and one of the highest overall scores in the event's open division. In 2025, AMP announced Grammy-winning soprano Karen Slack as the artist-in-residence for its Summer Series, where she was scheduled to lead masterclasses, perform as a featured soloist, and engage with AMP students and ensembles.

In Baltimore, OrchKids is a free after-school and in-school music program initiated by the Baltimore Symphony Orchestra (BSO) under their then–music director Marin Alsop. What began around 2008 with some 30 students in a single school had, by 2018, expanded to serve over 2,000 young people (Pre-K through 12th grade). Its activities take places across multiple sites in Baltimore, plus a summer program at Goucher College.

OrchKids was honored on 22 November 2013, with a National Arts and Humanities Youth Program Award, presented by Michelle Obama at the White House, in recognition of its success providing year-round, community-based music education to underserved youth in Baltimore. In May 2025, the BSO announced it had received a US$ 5 million gift from the Sherman Family Foundation, intended to expand its family and education programs — with a substantial portion earmarked for OrchKids.

In Boston, Massachusetts, the Boston String Academy was founded in 2012 by violinist twin sisters Mariesther Alvarez and Marielisa Alvarez, who were themselves trained in El Sistema in Venezuela before studying at Boston Conservatory. It offers three programs in Boston's Chinatown and Allston neighborhoods, initially serving some 120 students. After years of sustained training and commitment, the BSA's youth ensemble gave a concert at Carnegie Hall's Weill Recital Hall in New York City. The Boston Globe described this as a success giving students from underserved Boston communities access to high-level classical-music opportunities. Boston String Academy's youth musicians performed at Carnegie Hall in late 2024 in celebration of the 79th Session of the United Nations General Assembly, presenting a tribute to the UN's mission alongside Boston Conservatory's Venus Quartet.

In the Bronx, New York, UpBeat NYC was established in 2009. Active in South Bronx, the program offers year-round instruction in strings, winds, ensemble rehearsals, and Afro-Latin jazz. Progressing from early childhood music activities, including a "paper orchestra" to advanced youth orchestra and band experiences, the program aimed at fostering musical skills, confidence, and community building. UpBeat operates in Mott Haven and serves students from early childhood through young adulthood through free lessons, group classes, performance opportunities, and mentorship.

In Cambridge, Massachusetts, the Longy School of Music of Bard College and the LA Philharmonic formed the program Take a Stand in 2011 to promote and support the ESI music education movement, including a new Master of Arts in Teaching program. Take a Stand has aimed to train classically-trained musicians as socially conscious music educators, combining high-level musical instruction with a mission to support underserved communities.

Their project Side by Side has featured a two-week summer session in Cambridge, offering advanced training for young musicians from local ESI groups and concluding with performances in Harvard Square and at Pickman Hall. As the initiatives diversified, including adapting musical styles and community contexts, they underscored that "no one size fits all": ESI music education in the U.S. often looks quite different from its Venezuelan origin, and outcomes depend heavily on local conditions, resources, and organizational commitment.

In Chicago, Illinois, the Chicago Metamorphosis Orchestra Project (ChiMOP) was founded in May 2013. Its first program, the ChiMOP Summer Youth Orchestra, was a youth orchestra designed to bridge the gap between academic year programs. ChiMOP's second program, Mary Lyon Music, is an ESI program at Mary Lyon Elementary School in Chicago's Belmont Cragin neighborhood and was launched in September 2013. According to ChiMOP, its flagship initiative, the Mary Lyon Youth Orchestra, has served hundreds of students with instrument training, ensemble work, and community performances, and the organization also runs a Summer Youth Orchestra that tours and performs across the region.

Also in Chicago, Illinois, The People's Music School (TPMS) offers intensive music instruction and ensemble performance to children and teenagers across the Chicago area. Founded in 1976 , TPMS describes itself as "the largest completely tuition-free music school serving Chicago metropolitan children," committed to removing financial, geographic, and social barriers to high-quality music education. In its 2024–2025 report, TPMS notes it served over 800 students, providing access to instruction across 21 different instruments, supported by around 70 teaching artists.

Further, Shift, the Englewood Youth Orchestra is based in the Englewood neighborhood of Chicago, and was co-founded in July 2014 by musician Ayriole Frost. It provides intensive, ensemble-based music instruction and social support to children in grades 3–8 at Wentworth Elementary School.

In Cincinnati, Ohio, MYCincinnati, also known as "Music for Youth in Cincinnati", is a free, after-school youth orchestra program based in the Price Hill neighborhood of Cincinnati, run by the nonprofit Price Hill Will. It provides intensive ensemble-based music education for children (grades 3–12), giving them access to violin, viola, cello, and double bass instruction and the opportunity to play regularly in a full orchestra. Their youth orchestra program at the 2019 Creative Community Festival was listed as one of the positive artistic endeavors in the neighborhood. The festival welcomed international artists, representing a range of artistic disciplines, to perform at four locations across East Price Hill. The event was largely planned and run by volunteers, and nearly $8,000 was raised in advance to guarantee free admission for all attendees.

In Dayton, Ohio, Q the Music operates an after-school music education program in partnership with the Dayton Performing Arts Alliance, including the Dayton Philharmonic Orchestra, East End Community Services, and Ruskin Elementary School. Since 2012, it has been providing daily ensemble string instruction on violin, viola, and cello to students in grades 3–6, alongside academic tutoring and enrichment, with the dual goals of supporting musical skill development and broader academic and social growth for youth in the Dayton community.

In Durham, North Carolina, Kidznotes offers tuition-free out-of-school orchestra and band instruction to children from lower-income and Title I schools. The program serves elementary through high-school students. The program started a partnership in 2011 with the North Carolina Symphony. Through this, the orchestra has offered its education and community engagements, concerts and programs for free to KidZNotes students and their families. Its 2025 annual report described regular orchestral and ensemble rehearsals, summer camps, instrument provision, and community concerts.

In Fort Worth, Texas, the B Sharp Youth Music Program is a free extended-day music program founded in 2010 at Como Elementary, funded by The Goff Family Foundation in partnership with the Fort Worth Independent School District. At the time the only ESI music program in North Texas, B Sharp fosters positive youth development through ensemble-based music instruction, peer-to-peer teaching, group-centered playing, life skills training and the social aspect of learning music.

In Los Angeles, the Youth Orchestra Los Angeles (YOLA) is the Los Angeles Philharmonic's initiative to establish youth orchestra programs in ethnically diverse and underprivileged communities throughout Los Angeles. Inspired by LA Phil's music and artistic director Gustavo Dudamel, the LA Phil founded YOLA in 2007. As many children came from Mexican migrant worker families, the project Take a Stand decided to start by focusing on mariachi and its principal instruments: trumpet, violin, guitar, and bass, rather than starting with classical music.

The YOLA National Festival (Youth Orchestra Los Angeles National Festival), previously known as National Take a Stand Festival, is an intensive summer learning program for top-tier musicians aged 12–18 of ESUSA. Student musicians perform at Walt Disney Concert Hall with Gustavo Dudamel for their annual performance. In 2023, the program, held at Pepperdine University, brought together 177 young musicians who took part in two ensembles: a 105-player symphony orchestra for participants aged 14 to 18, and a 72-member chamber orchestra for those between 12 and 14. Participation in the YOLA National Festival is provided free, covering air-travel, boarding, and instruction.

In Miami, Florida, the Miami Music Project is a nonprofit organization founded in 2008 that provides free, ESI music education to children in under-resourced communities. Its programs focus on ensemble-based learning, youth orchestras, and social development, and the organization has served thousands of students across several Miami-Dade neighborhoods. Its community impact includes adaptations during the COVID-19 pandemic, recognition through awards such as the 2024 Music Cities Award for diversity and inclusion, and media reports on its teaching methods, including introductory "paper orchestras."

Also in Miami, Florida, the Pinecrest City Music Project (PCMP) is a nonprofit, tuition-free music education organization founded in 2018, operating in the Miami–Dade area. The organization is notable for being student-led: its staff comprises high-school-aged musicians who teach, manage, and fund the programs. It was founded by former Brown University student Daniel Solomon, who is blind since birth. PCMP is an arts education program that educates public school students to become holistic arts leaders, both in and outside the classroom.

With 502 students and 31 student-staff, PCMP has been operating, funding and instructing 8 weekly arts education programs. PCMP was the first student-led nonprofit grants recipient of Miami-Dade County, and the only student-run instructional contractor to the Miami-Dade School Board. In addition to classical orchestral instruction, PCMP offers a broad curriculum that includes string orchestras (its "Sprouts Strings" for beginners), digital music production, vocal performance, music theory and composition. PCMP addresses socioeconomic, disability, and gender disparities by providing full scholarships for every participating family, collaborating with Miami public school ESE departments to create sensory-focused arts programs, and launching a female STEM–Music Coding initiative in partnership with Georgia Tech.

In New York City the Harmony Project began with their daily after-school music lessons to children from underserved communities as a pilot program in 2003. It was founded by Anne Fitzgibbon, who had studied El Sistema in Venezuela on a year-long Fulbright Fellowship. The program has trained and employed college- and graduate-level music students as teachers. After being incorporated as an independent nonprofit organization, the Harmony Program was re-launched in 2008 through a partnership with the City University of New York.

In Newport News, Virginia, Soundscapes uses intensive music instruction and frequent ensemble performances to support the social, emotional, and academic development of young people in the community. It was founded in 2009 after co-founders Anne Henry and Reynaldo Ramirez were inspired by Venezuela's El Sistema model. The organization has been providing free after-school music programs, instruments, and instruction for students beginning in early elementary school, with programming expanding to multiple school sites and summer camps. In addition to daily music education, Soundscapes oversees ensembles such as the Peninsula Youth Orchestra, which serves musicians from roughly age 10 to 25, and has launched the Peninsula Youth Jazz Band to broaden musical opportunities.

In Paterson, New Jersey, the Paterson Music Project (PMP) is an after-school and weekend music-education initiative operated by Wharton Arts that provides tuition-free or greatly subsidized musical training for children in grades 1–12 across Paterson public and charter schools. Students receive instruction on a primary instrument, join ensembles (string orchestra, band, guitar, jazz, etc.), take part in instrument sectionals and private lessons, and frequently perform both at school and in community events. In recognition of its community impact, PMP received a grant from National Endowment for the Arts (NEA) in 2023 to support its Saturday Community Music Program, which allows students from any public school in Paterson to participate in city-wide ensembles, smaller groups, and private lessons.

In Philadelphia, Pennsylvania, Play On Philly (POP) was founded in 2011 by trumpeter and educator Stanford Thompson, beginning with a cohort of 110 children at St. Francis de Sales School in West Philadelphia. The program expanded soon afterward with a second site at Freire Charter Middle School, bringing total enrollment to some 200 students. POP provides learning opportunities for its students, including a six-week, full-day summer music academy for first- through twelfth-graders held at Temple University's Boyer College of Music and Dance. It also runs the Play On Philly Symphony Orchestra, which offers middle- and high-school musicians advanced ensemble training and presents concerts throughout the region each year. In 2021, POP reported serving 350 students through multiple sites, expanding access beyond its original location, supported by a $1 million donation from philanthropist MacKenzie Scott.

In Portland, Oregon, the BRAVO Youth Orchestras began in 2013 as an independent non-profit organization. Under its motto "Social Change Through Music " it partners with Portland public schools to provide in-school music classes.

In Saint Louis, Missouri, the Lemp Neighborhood Arts Center has operated Orchestrating Diversity since 2009. It provides free education in orchestral music to inner city youth of Saint Louis. Students participate in an eight-week summer intensive course that provides music instruction for eight hours per day, as well as an after-school program throughout the regular school year. They are taught music theory, history and musicianship at college level.

In a large ensemble known as the Orchestrating Diversity Urban Youth Orchestra, students are learning to perform symphonic music. Professional musicians, college faculty members, and student volunteers from Washington University in St. Louis and Saint Louis University provide free private instruction. In the summer of 2012, Orchestrating Diversity began the Junior Urban Music Program (JUMP), which offers beginners music classes to children aged 5–8 years old. Because of JUMP's success in its inaugural year, it was expanded in the summer of 2013 to provide classes in East Saint Louis, Illinois.

In Union City, New Jersey, the Union Children's Music Project (UCMP) is a bilingual organization based in Hudson County, New Jersey that uses intensive orchestral, vocal, and arts instruction to support underserved children and youth. The program provides free instruments, low-cost after-school ensemble training, choir, and performance opportunities for students from preschool through high school, aiming to build self-esteem, cooperation, academic skills, and community engagement through music. UCMP was launched in 2012 as the first ESI music education program in New Jersey, serving urban, predominantly Latinx communities with a supportive learning environment and regular performance experiences.

In Washington Heights-Inwood, New York, the WHIN Music Project was founded by El Sistema Fellow David Gracia in August 2012. It provides free or low-cost ensemble-based music instruction, including choir, strings, early-childhood music, pre-orchestra and youth-orchestra programs, and weekly music classes to underserved youth in the community. Over the years WHIN has served over 150 students weekly and aims to build an ecosystem of orchestral practice in the neighborhood, using music as a tool for social inclusion, community building, and personal development.

In Yakima, Washington, Yakima Music en Acción (YAMA) is a nonprofit youth-orchestra and ensemble-based music education program founded in 2013. It was established through a partnership among Yakima Symphony Orchestra (YSO), the local school district and community organizations. YAMA has collaborated with the Music Conservatory of Sandpoint, also an ESI program, creating a collaborative youth orchestra with students from around the globe.

=== Canada ===
El Sistema-based programs exist in almost every province of Canada, with 17 programs as of 2025. Two of these in Ottawa and New Brunswick were studied in a 2021 scoping research from Queen's University at Kingston, Ontario.

El Sistema Aeolian (London, Ontario) was established in November 2011 and grew out of The Aeolian Performing Arts Centre, in London, Ontario. It serves approximately 75 students attracted from the greater London area. Currently, the program runs 4 days per week and includes youth string orchestra, choir, an adult orchestra, Indonesian gamelan, free donated pianos and lessons and gives between 15 and 20 performances per year.

El Sistema South London (ESSL) (London, Ontario and St. Thomas, Ontario) was established in 2012 serving students at two South London schools. In 2018, the program expanded to serve schools in St. Thomas, Ontario. Also in 2018, a new program entitled Ability Through Drumming was established to provide drumming lessons to children in London with physical and developmental disabilities.

OrKidstra (Ottawa, Ontario) was established in October 2007. It serves 400 students from Centretown inner-city schools through in-school programming (150 students) and after school programming (250 students). The program is made possible through its many partnerships with local community supporters such as the Ottawa-Carleton District School Board, and the Ontario National Arts Centre.

Quintissimo (Belleville, Ontario) was established in January 2023. Its mission is to create positive social change by providing free music education to underserved children in the Bay of Quinte area. Lessons are currently offered out of Prince Edward Collegiate Institute.

Saint James Music Academy (Vancouver, British Columbia) Canada's first El-sistema program, was established in September 2007. It serves 480 students from Downtown Eastside inner-city schools through its outreach (280 students) and after school program (200 students). The program is an official community partner of the Vancouver Symphony Orchestra.

Sistema Kingston is a program based at Molly Brant Elementary School in Kingston, Ontario, founded in 2015. The program's partnerships include The Dan School of Drama & Music at Queen's University, the Joe Chithalen Memorial Music Instrument Lending Library and the Kingston Symphony.

Sistema New Brunswick (Moncton, New Brunswick) A program of the New Brunswick Youth Orchestra, Sistema NB was started in 2009 in Moncton and has since grown to include centres all across the province. It is an intensive music education program for over 1,200 children and youth, 2–3 hours after school, 5 days per week during the school year. It comprises a network of local children's orchestras in 9 communities throughout the province of New Brunswick, regional youth orchestras, and a provincial youth orchestra. Sistema NB serves urban and rural communities, operates in both English and French language, and engages children and youth from under-resourced, indigenous and newcomer communities. In 2021, Sistema NB launched '10,000 Children' with a plan to at least double in size and to engage 10,000 children and youth in New Brunswick. Sistema NB is supported by the Province of New Brunswick as well as individuals, businesses, charitable foundations and others.

Sistema Toronto was founded in 2011 by businessman and community activist Robert Eisenberg. Sistema Toronto's first center opened at Parkdale Junior and Senior Public School; the second opened in 2013 at Jane/Finch's Yorkwoods Public School. Sistema Toronto has since opened two centres at Military Trail Public School and St. Martin de Porres Catholic School in Scarborough's Kingston-Galloway-Orton Park neighbourhood. As of 2017, enrollment was 240 children aged 6–13.

Sistema Winnipeg was started in 2011 as a partnership between the Winnipeg Symphony Orchestra, Winnipeg School Division, and Sevenoaks School Division. The program runs every day after school for approximately 130 students, and includes a meal, choir, orchestra, and social programming. Sistema Winnipeg has performed with the Winnipeg Symphony Orchestra and collaborated with music director Naomi Woo, assistant conductor of the Winnipeg Symphony Orchestra in 2019. In 2023, Sistema Winnipeg participated in the CBC Music Class Challenge, recorded at the Seven Oaks Performing Arts Centre.

YONA-Sistema (Youth Orchestra of Northern Alberta – Sistema) (Edmonton, Alberta) was established in September 2013. It serves students at Delton School and Mother Teresa Elementary School in Edmonton, Alberta and is offered through a partnership between the Edmonton Symphony Orchestra, the Edmonton Catholic School District, the Edmonton Public School Board, and the Inner City Children's Program.

== Reception ==
=== Scholarly research ===
Since the 2010s, researchers have been subjecting ESI programmes in the U.S. to empirical scrutiny. A project at Duke University titled "Defining Social Change Through Music with El Sistema USA" analysed ESUSA's 2020 national census data, including finances, staffing, and demographics. The project reported how member programmes define and structure "social change through music." It found a heavy reliance on foundation funding for many programs and documented a shift during the COVID-19 pandemic toward hybrid or virtual provision. In particular, the study found structural vulnerabilities and demographic mismatches between students and teaching staff.

Evaluating 30 relevant articles published in English between 2010 and 2020, a research team from Queen's University at Kingston, Ontario, published their study "A scoping review of research that examines El Sistema and Sistema-inspired music education". The review noted both reported benefits for students (well-being, social connections, musical learning) as well as important methodological limits of the studies (small samples, short timeframes, inconsistent outcome measuring). The review's summary read as follows:

Overall, the results of this scoping review strongly suggest that Sistema-inspired music education programmes have great potential for positively impacting students, particularly in terms of musical and social-emotional development, with less convincing but nevertheless reasonable evidence of increased academic achievement and cognitive development. The authors conclude that realising the potential of El Sistema and Sistema-inspired programming requires context- and student-specific teaching, curricula, and community support.

— Benjamin Bolden, Sean Corcoran, Alana Butler. Faculty of Education, Queen's University, Kingston, Canada, A scoping review of research that examines El Sistema and Sistema-inspired music education programmes

Further, the findings indicate that Sistema teachers should move toward more learner-centered teaching. This includes encouraging students' creativity, self-expression, and personal agency, reducing the dominant focus on Eurocentric musical traditions, valuing diverse musical styles and cultural backgrounds, and aligning their instructional methods with modern Kindergarten to 12th grade and community-music education practices.

=== Further studies ===
Published by the Journal of the College Music Society in 2014, the article "Music as Life-Saving Project: Venezuela's El Sistema in American Neo-Idealistic Imagination" by Ludim R. Pedroza examined how El Sistema has been interpreted differently in the United States and Venezuela. Pedroza argued that U.S. commentators often frame the program through a neo-idealistic belief in the universal, transformative power of Western classical music, portraying it as a "miraculous" social-rescue model. In contrast, within Venezuela the initiative is perceived to be rooted in a broader social and cultural mission that blends orchestral practice with local musical traditions and emphasizes community building, national identity, and social inclusion. The article indicated the tension between these perspectives and suggested that international narratives can oversimplify or overlook the Venezuelan program's postcolonial, socially embedded character.

In 2017, a study of the effects of ESI music programs in the United States presented a longitudinal evaluation of programs at multiple sites. It found sizeable musical growth and socioemotional gains of the students, though benefits varied by gender and years of participation. Further, the authors raised questions about how many years of participation are needed as well as about the program design and equity.

In 2018, members of the University of Florida published their longitudinal research project on the positive development of students who participated in the ESI Miami Music Project. The study assessed social–emotional factors related to the Five Cs of Positive Youth Development—competence, confidence, caring, character, and connection—and found that participants improved noticeably in each area during the year of the study.

A 2019 study from McGill University in Montreal reported about children's own positive perspectives on their well-being since participating in an ESI program. The study found students increasingly coped more with stress, learned patience and confidence. They also formed better relationships with peers and family and had become more motivated and ambitious.

The 2025 study "El Sistema: Music for Sustainability Goals and Education" by two researchers from Kyung Hee University, Seoul, and Gachon University, Republic of Korea, described how El Sistema aligns with and contributes to the United Nations Sustainable Development Goals (SDGs). The analysis covered five case countries where El Sistema has been localized and sustained over time: Scotland, the United States, Sweden, South Korea, and Japan. The study found that ESI programs in the examined countries show alignment with many of the UN's SDGs. Based on these cases, the authors suggest that, under supportive conditions, including localized strategy, stable funding, multi-level governance, systematic evaluation, and even integration with environmental or broader sustainability initiatives, ESI programs can function as a sustainable model of social music education.

=== Articles in public media ===
Media coverage also reflects the challenges and evolving nature of Sistema-based programs in the U.S. Coverage of the Youth Orchestra Los Angeles (YOLA), one of ESUSA's flagship initiatives, has emphasized its role in providing free, ensemble-based music education to underserved communities in Los Angeles. However, recent press reports illustrated financial instability and uncertainty for some YOLA branches. In November 2025, Los Angeles Philharmonic (LA Phil) announced far-reaching reductions to YOLA's East Los Angeles program, this time at the Esteban E. Torres High School site. The cuts were attributed to unanticipated financial and funding challenges facing the organization. After outcry from families and the local community, LA Phil secured additional donor funding, temporarily restoring full programming at the East L.A. site, albeit only through the end of the school year.

In 2016, Stanford Thompson, the executive director of the El Sistema-inspired program "Play On, Philly" and founding board chairman of El Sistema USA, published his comments on a critical review in the Washington Post of the book Playing for Their Lives: The Global El Sistema Movement for Social Change Through Music. Referring to the accomplishments of ESI-related programs Thompson wrote that people involved in these programs did not view El Sistema as a universal solution, nor did they expect music instruction to resolve the deep structural problems affecting underserved families. What they recognized was that meaningful change "is made through a lot of hard work, dedication and persistence." Further, Thompson stated:

Every day, our students' practice with instruments helps them practice these skills: the regulation of complex cognitive processes like working memory, reasoning, flexibility, and problem solving as well as planning and execution. We know that those who possess these skills will out-perform those who don't have them and we are confident that learning to play music is the best way for our young people to acquire them.

— Stanford Thompson, The "Cult" of El Sistema Keeps Playing On In a Different Key

== See also ==
- Music education
- Music education for young children
- El Sistema-inspired programs
- Scholarship and criticism of El Sistema (music education program)

== Literature ==
- Booth, Eric; Tunstall, Tricia (13 September 2016). Playing for Their Lives: The Global El Sistema Movement for Social Change Through Music. W. W. Norton & Company. ISBN 978-0-393-24565-3.
- Majno, Maria (2012). "From the model of El Sistema in Venezuela to current applications: learning and integration through collective music education". Annals of the New York Academy of Sciences. 1252 (1): 56–64. Bibcode:2012NYASA1252...56M. doi:10.1111/j.1749-6632.2012.06498.x. ISSN 1749-6632. PMID 22524340.
- Hallam, Susan (August 2010). "The power of music: Its impact on the intellectual, social and personal development of children and young people". International Journal of Music Education. 28 (3): 269–289. doi:10.1177/0255761410370658. ISSN 0255-7614.
