= El Sistema-inspired programs =

International music education programs for children and young adults

El Sistema-inspired programs are community-based music education programs in several countries inspired by the system of music schools in Venezuela known as El Sistema. Founded in 1975 by José Antonio Abreu, a Venezuelan educator, musician, and activist, El Sistema is built on the belief that the collective playing of music from an early age fosters personal growth, artistic expression, discipline, teamwork, and social integration.

During the 50 years since its beginnings, millions of children and young people have studied mainly classical music free of charge in El Sistema centers all over Venezuela. Financed by successive governments, El Sistema has created hundreds of orchestras and choirs and the program has received wide international recognition as one of the largest music education programs in the world. Graduates of El Sistema, including Gustavo Dudamel, Edicson Ruiz, Rafael Payare, Ron Davis Alvarez and Natalia Luis-Bassa, have embarked on international careers as conductors, musicians, composers and music educators.

As of 2022, more than 250 world-wide El Sistema-inspired (ESI) programs in all continents were listed by El Sistema Global, a U.S.-based nonprofit organization that supports and connects educators, leaders, and programs sharing basic principles and methods. As one of their key social goals, ESI programs are intended to support the cognitive and social growth of all participating children, including those from underserved communities. El Sistema is part of the project "Music for Social Action", and similar programs have been called "Music for Social Change".

In his studies, British musicologist Geoffrey Baker has referred to ESI programs as "Social Action through Music" (SATM). With regard to the social benefits of the programs, however, Baker and other scholars have claimed that strong empirical evidence for this goal has been scarce and exaggerated.

== El Sistema Venezuela ==
El Sistema (The System), officially the National Network of Youth and Children Orchestras of Venezuela, is a publicly financed, free music education program for children and young people at the community level. As a part of the project "Music for Social Action", it was founded in 1975 by José Antonio Abreu, a Venezuelan educator, musician and activist. The program is built on the belief that the collective playing of music from an early age fosters personal growth, artistic expression, discipline, teamwork, and social integration.

In 1993, Abreu was awarded the UNESCO International Music Prize. UNESCO appointed Abreu as a Special Ambassador for the Development of a Global Network of Youth and Children Orchestras and Choirs in 1995 within the framework of UNESCO's "World Movement of Youth and Children Orchestras and Choirs". This project was created in the context of an interdisciplinary project "Towards a Culture of Peace". Abreu co-ordinated the programme through the UNESCO office in Caracas and was designated a UNESCO Goodwill Ambassador in 1998.

According to UNICEF, El Sistema included over 400 music centers and 1700 smaller teaching units for more than one million young musicians in 2022. In the 50 years since its beginnings, El Sistema has inspired similar programmes in many countries, and in 2025, El Sistema published an overview on ESI music programs in all continents.

== ESI programs around the world ==
=== Sistema Global ===
Sistema Global is a U.S.-based nonprofit organization that supports and connects educators, leaders, and programs inspired by El Sistema, the Venezuelan national music education model. On their website, the organization lists a program directory with more than 250 music education programs in six continents inspired by El Sistema in Venezuela.

The HundrED Foundation selected Sistema Global for its Global Education Innovation Collection, highlighting the organization's role in promoting social engagement and youth empowerment through ensemble music education. According to HundrED, Sistema Global operates in over 40 countries and remains committed to El Sistema's original pedagogical and social model through its partnership with the El Sistema organization in Venezuela.

==== History and Mission ====
Sistema Global was created to realize a vision articulated by El Sistema founder José Antonio Abreu. In his 2009 TED Talk, Abreu spoke of a global network linking El Sistema–inspired programs around the world. Over time, the need for an online network where program leaders, teachers, and students could share learning resources, collaborate, and support each other became clear, and Sistema Global grew to fulfill that role. According to the organization's website, its stated mission is "to connect, encourage, and inspire" ESI teachers and leaders everywhere and to raise greater awareness of the El Sistema approach to music education worldwide.

Sistema Global provides a variety of resources and services tailored to both teachers and students. It encompasses a broad range of approaches and cultural models, each shaped by distinct local conditions.The organization collects and curates teaching materials, online courses, and mentoring support contributed by El Sistema teachers globally, including Sistema Global ambassadors. It offers independent support to teachers and students, serving as a point of contact for pedagogical guidance or professional advice. Sistema Global plans to provide sheet music, online lessons, and information about music centers around the world.

It maintains a programme directory listing ESI local programs in multiple countries. Sistema Global does not itself operate music centers, but rather supports existing ESI programs and helps new ones form. Its connection to El Sistema is assured by several El Sistema leaders who serve on its board, preserving fidelity to Abreu's original social mission.

== North America ==
=== El Sistema USA ===
El Sistema USA, also known as National Alliance of El Sistema-Inspired Programs, is a nonprofit organization based in Durham, North Carolina. In 2025, its network directory listed more than 140 member programs serving over 30,000 young people across the United States and Canada.

El Sistema USA supports its members through professional development, providing assistance for emerging programs through training, mentoring, financial support, and administrative guidance. Its activities are aimed at using ensemble-based music education to promote social development, including among youth from underserved communities. It aims to strengthen long-term viability by fostering donor development and creative fundraising efforts, all with the goal of using music education and ensemble playing to build key life skills among young people facing economic hardship.

The philosophy and aspirations of El Sistema USA are expressed on their website as:

"We envision a world in which every child — regardless of income, geography, or identity — has access to a high-quality music education program that builds community, opportunity, and personal growth. Our model emphasizes programs with free or low-cost tuition, frequent instruction (5-10+ hours per week), and ensemble-based learning."

=== Notable ESI-programs in the U.S. ===
Following José Abreu's 2009 TED talk, TED funded the Sistema Fellows Program at the New England Conservatory. In this five-year program, 50 young musicians received instruction in conducting and leading youth orchestras across the United States. Special emphasis was given to leadership and community development, and the program included a month‐long residency to become familiar with El Sistema in Venezuela. The program ran from 2009 to 2024, with graduates taking up artistic and management positions at music education programs, including the Corona Youth Music Project in Queens, New York, New West Symphony Harmony Project in Ventura, California, and Music for Youth in Cincinnati, Ohio.

The Harmony Program in New York City began with their daily after-school music lessons to children from underserved communities as a pilot program in 2003. The program trained and employed college- and graduate-level music students as teachers. After being incorporated as an independent nonprofit organization, the Harmony Program was re-launched in 2008 through a partnership with the City University of New York. It was founded by Anne Fitzgibbon, who had studied El Sistema in Venezuela on a year-long Fulbright Fellowship.

The Youth Orchestra Los Angeles (YOLA) is the Los Angeles Philharmonic's initiative to establish youth orchestra programs in ethnically diverse and underprivileged communities throughout Los Angeles. Inspired by the Los Angeles Philharmonic's music and artistic director Gustavo Dudamel's experience with Venezuela's El Sistema youth orchestra movement, the LA Phil founded YOLA in 2007. In 2021, YOLA provided free instruments, music training, and academic support to about 1,300 students age 6-18. The same year, the Judith and Thomas L. Beckmen YOLA Center at Inglewood was inaugurated, becoming YOLA's first permanent concert hall.

In 2011, the Longy School of Music of Bard College in Cambridge, Massachusetts and the Los Angeles Philharmonic formed the program Take a Stand to promote and support the ESI music education movement, and in particular socially committed music teachers through a new Masters of Arts in Teaching degree program in the United States.

=== Canada ===
In September 2007, Saint James Music Academy in Vancouver, British Columbia, was established as Canada's first El-Sistema program. Sistema New Brunswick in Moncton, New Brunswick, is a program of the New Brunswick Youth Orchestra, and started in 2009. It has since grown to include centres across the province. In 2021, Sistema NB launched their 10,000 Children Campaign to engage 10,000 children and youth in New Brunswick over the life of the program.

Sistema Toronto was founded in 2011 by businessman and community activist Robert Eisenberg. Sistema Toronto's first centre opened at Parkdale Junior and Senior Public School; the second opened in 2013 at Jane/Finch's Yorkwoods Public School. Sistema Toronto has since opened two centres in Scarborough's Kingston-Galloway-Orton Park neighbourhood. As of 2017, enrollment was 240 children aged 6–13.

Sistema Winnipeg began in 2011 as a partnership between the Winnipeg Symphony Orchestra, Winnipeg School Division, and Sevenoaks School Division. The program runs every day after school for approximately 130 students and includes a meal, choir, orchestra, and social programming. Sistema Winnipeg performs regularly with the Winnipeg Symphony Orchestra and is led by Music Director Naomi Woo, who is also assistant conductor of the Winnipeg Symphony Orchestra.

The Youth Orchestra of Northern Alberta (YONA-Sistema) in Edmonton, Alberta, was established in September 2013. It serves students at local schools and is offered through a partnership between the Edmonton Symphony Orchestra, the Edmonton Catholic School District, the Edmonton Public School Board, and the Inner City Children's Program.

== Latin America ==
Across Latin America, El Sistema's social‐music education model has strongly influenced music education systems. In Mexico, projects such as Esperanza Azteca, founded in 2009, draw heavily from the Venezuelan framework, focusing on orchestral discipline and social inclusion. The Fundación Nacional Batuta in Colombia was founded in 1991, modelled on Venezuela's El Sistema. By 2020, over 500,000 children and young people had taken part in Batuta's musical programs. After Venezuela, it is the largest such programme in the world.

Brazil developed regional adaptations through programs like Núcleos de Arte in São Paulo and Projeto Guri, blending local cultural identity with collective ensemble training. Argentina's Orquesta Infantil y Juvenil network emphasizes civic participation and social development through music, demonstrating a flexible, community-centered interpretation of the model.

Other ESI programs in Latin America include Guatemala, Peru, and Uruguay.

== Australia, New Zealand and Oceania ==
El Sistema-inspired initiatives in Oceania adapt the Venezuelan model of social transformation through collective music-making to local contexts emphasizing indigenous inclusion, social equity, and community development. In Australia, programs like Sistema Australia (founded 2011), Tasmanian Symphony Orchestra's Jam Program, and Sydney Youth Orchestra's outreach initiatives integrate ensemble-based learning with community cohesion and access for disadvantaged youth.

In Auckland, New Zealand, Sistema Aotearoa (founded 2011) is a flagship program rooted in Māori and Pasifika communities, combining El Sistema's orchestral model with bicultural pedagogy. The program has been collaborating with the Auckland Philharmonia in a number of projects. Across Oceania, smaller programs in Fiji, Papua New Guinea, and Samoa have used Sistema principles for community development and youth engagement.

== Asia ==
El Sistema has influenced a variety of youth music education initiatives across Asia, where its emphasis on ensemble learning and social inclusion has been adapted to local cultural and institutional contexts.

In South Korea, one of the most established regional implementations of El Sistema Korea, is The Orchestra of Dream, a nationwide program supported by the Korea Arts and Culture Education Service. Founded in the early 2010s, it operates community-based orchestras and music centers that provide free or low-cost instruction to children, with a focus on social development, cooperation, and accessible arts participation.

In Japan, El Sistema principles have been incorporated into projects coordinated by El Sistema Japan (ESJ), a non-profit organization working in partnership with schools, municipalities, and professional ensembles. Programs have included children's orchestras and choral initiatives in communities such as Fukushima, where music has been used as a tool for resilience, cultural enrichment, and youth engagement. The first such programme in Japan was launched in 2012, in Sōma, Fukushima Prefecture, as part of post-2011 disaster reconstruction efforts. Since then, ESJ has expanded activities to other prefectures and cities, including Otsuchi, Iwate Prefecture, Komagane, Nagano Prefecture, and programmes in and around Tokyo, Japan.

Similar community-driven efforts appear in China, where initiatives such as Wings of Music have applied El Sistema-inspired pedagogies to reach children from migrant or underserved backgrounds through orchestral and ensemble activities. El Sistema's influence in Asia also extends to smaller and emerging projects.

In the Philippines, Sistemang Pilipino Inc. offers orchestra and ensemble instruction for young people, drawing explicitly on the Venezuelan model and emphasizing empowerment through collective music education and performance.

== Europe ==
El Sistema has influenced a range of music education programs across Europe, where its combination of ensemble-based instruction and social development has been adapted to national and local contexts. Across continental Europe, El Sistema-inspired projects have taken shape through partnerships among orchestras, schools, and social agencies. A broad European network has been facilitated by Sistema Europe, founded to connect and support ESI practitioners throughout the region.

Through training exchanges, conferences, and youth orchestra festivals, the network has contributed to the adaptation and dissemination of El Sistema's educational philosophy across diverse cultural and institutional settings in Europe. Among other projects, the Sistema Europe Youth Orchestra (SEYO) has given concerts in European countries, including Italy and Spain. In 2024, Sistema Europe developed a mandatory Child Safeguarding Policy for all its members.

=== Austria and Switzerland ===
In 2007, the ESI organization Superar was founded in Vienna. El Sistema Austria has been running music schools, workshops and an academy for orchestra based on El Sistema methods and principles in several cities in Austria. In Switzerland, Superar Suisse – Music for Change was started in 2012.

=== Eastern Europe ===
Superar in Vienna has also supported music organizations for over 5,600 children from seven European countries, including Hungary, Slovakia, Rumania and Bosnia-Herzegovina.

In partnership with the House of Good Tones, an ESI reconciliation music program located in Serbia, Bosnia & Herzegovina, and Croatia, Teaching Artists International has awarded dedicated fellowships to musicians for developing their skills as music educators and agents of change.

=== France ===
In France, ESI music education has developed through collaborations among cultural institutions, local governments, and social organizations. One of the most visible initiatives is Démos (Dispositif d'Éducation Musicale et Orchestrale à Vocation Sociale), a program created in cooperation with the Philharmonie de Paris at the Cité de la Musique to provide orchestral training for children who have limited access to formal music education. Established in 2010, Démos employs intensive ensemble-based instruction supported by professional musicians and social workers, including pedagogical and social principles associated with El Sistema.

=== Germany ===
In Germany, the Musaik – Grenzenlos musizieren (Musaik – Music Without Borders) program has been working in Dresden since 2017. It was inspired by an El Sistema program in Peru. In 2025 the founders and music teachers Luise Börner and Deborah Oehler were awarded the Order of Merit of the Federal Republic of Germany.

=== Liechtenstein ===
The Hilti Foundation in Liechtenstein has been sponsoring the international program "Music for Social Change". Among other music education programs, the foundation has supported grassroot programs including Sinfonía por el Perú, the Fundación Cultural Papageno in Chile, El Sistema Greece, the Elijah Association for neglected Romani children and their families in Transylvania, Romania, and Superar, based in Austria. Another of the foundation's international programs is the Academy for Impact through Music (AIM).

=== Spain ===
In Spain, various regional foundations, conservatories, and community organizations have adopted elements of the El Sistema model to expand access to ensemble music-making. ESI programs such as Action Por La Música operate in multiple autonomous communities, emphasizing social inclusion, collective practice, and partnerships with municipal cultural institutions.

=== Sweden ===
El Sistema Sweden was launched in 2010 in the Gothenburg suburb of Angered through a publicly funded cultural school and has since expanded to dozens of sites throughout the country. More than 9,000 children across 33 municipalities in Sweden have participated in the program, which claims to be the largest El Sistema programme outside of Latin America.

In 2019, the El Sistema Sweden National Orchestra was established. Ron Davis Alvarez, a graduate of El Sistema in Venezuela, has served as artistic director of El Sistema Sweden and the El Sistema Sweden National Orchestra (Swedish: El Sistema Nationalorkester). Another program is the Dream Orchestra, where unaccompanied young refugees from Syria, Afghanistan, Iraq and Somalia have been playing musical instruments since 2016.

=== United Kingdom ===
In the United Kingdom, Sistema Scotland's Big Noise program, established in 2008, became one of the earliest large-scale European adaptations, operating long-term orchestral programs in several communities to promote social transformation through music. Similar initiatives emerged in England and Wales, where local authorities, charities, and arts organizations developed ensemble programs modeled on El Sistema's intensive, community-centred approach.

In Harmony is a British government-led music education and community development project based on El Sistema. It was started in 2009 with Julian Lloyd Webber appointed as chairman of its steering group. The project receives funding from the Department for Education and Arts Council England. On 22 November 2007, Julian Lloyd Webber noted the following in regard to the UK government's announcement of an infusion of £332 million dedicated to music education:

We also have an impoverished South American nation to thank. Last August, in the midst of school holidays, when an uncomfortable number of British children seemed even more disaffected than usual, the Simon Bolivar Youth Orchestra arrived from Venezuela to deliver performances at the Edinburgh Festival and the London Proms that were, quite simply, miraculous"

Lloyd Webber visited Venezuela in late 2009 and reported on what he saw there.

In Harmony has centers in Lambeth, Leeds, led by Opera North, Liverpool, led by the Royal Liverpool Philharmonic Orchestra, Newcastle Gateshead, Nottingham, Norwich, and Telford and Stoke-on-Trent. In 2013, El Sistema Venezuela announced a partnership with In Harmony, which aimed at children from both countries to work together in a series of musical projects.

Sistema Scotland was established with a grant from the Scottish Arts Council in 2008, as a result of an initiative by its chairman Richard Holloway in the economically deprived area of Raploch, in Stirling. They run 'Big Noise' programmes across Scotland, which are high-quality music education and social change programmes that work intensively with children, young people and families within targeted communities. The charity run six Big Noise programmes, in Raploch, Stirling, Glasgow, Aberdeen), Dundee, Stirling, and Wester Hailes, Edinburgh.

Sistema Cymru - Codi'r To is a community regeneration project established in 2014, and now giving weekly music lessons to 500 children in the towns of Bangor and Caernarfon, North Wales. Based on the El Sistema project, the charity help deliver brass and percussion lessons to children from deprived communities, working closely with local schools and music establishments. They celebrated their 10th birthday in 2024.

== Scholarship and criticism ==
El Sistema has been called "one of the largest and most famous music education programs in the world, [that] has spread to dozens of countries." By producing many orchestral performers, it has firmly established Venezuela's place on the international classical-music scene. Based on its growing success, there has been wide public appreciation in newsmedia for international El Sistema-inspired (ESI) music education programs, but much less attention towards scientific studies of the claims and outcomes of their intended Social Action through Music (SATM). Studies have cautioned that most "evidence" for ESI programs comes from the program's own reporting, rather than external academic research.

Since 2014, British musicologist Geoffrey Baker has published books, newspaper articles and blogs about the public image of the program and the contradictions he perceived in the actual implementation of El Sistema. – Other academic literature has tended to examine ESI-music education more broadly and positively, referring to educational policy and ethics, emotional, social and musical outcomes.

As a 2020 overview on studies on programs in Australia, Europe, China, Canada and the U.S. wrote, the cognitive, psychological, musical and social development through music education for children should be investigated in long-term studies with detailed descriptions of the learners, the specific programs, and the settings in which they operate.

=== Academic studies ===
The Venezuelan program is primarily a social inclusive initiative. Yet, such instances of unquestionable musical accomplishment are claimed [...] as successful outcomes of the program's social inclusive agenda. However, no available data comparing social backgrounds with professional ascendency has been found in the course of this research. Furthermore, up to now there have been no empirical studies on the rate of participants that were part of the program.

— Gustavo Borchert, Sistema Scotland: A Critical Inquiry into the Implementation of the El Sistema Model in Raploch.,

In 2011, the Scottish Government published an extensive evaluation of the Big Noise Youth Orchestra in the economically deprived area of Raploch. The research indicated that the program offers a "positive and unique experience" that benefits children and often their families as well. Referring to multiple policy domains—education, justice, health, culture, and community development, Sistema Scotland highlighted eight national priorities, to which the program corresponded. The evaluation found that the program was already contributing to all eight and could strengthen its impact further. It noted that "By being part of an orchestra and through giving public performances, the children‟s confidence grows, they learn to work in a team, to co-operate and contribute effectively to the orchestra."

Writing for the Institute of Education, University College London, Andrea Creech argued that beyond the original El Sistema in Venezuela, the real impact may lie in the nearly 300 El Sistema-inspired programs operating across around 60 countries as of 2014. Among those, the program In Harmony, part of Sistema England, was noted as a successful example, bringing orchestral music education to children who otherwise lack access.

In 2017, a study of the effects of ESI music programs in the United States presented a longitudinal evaluation of programs at multiple sites in the U.S. It found significant musical growth and socioemotional gains of the students, though benefits varied by gender and years of participation. Further, the authors raised questions about how many years of participation are needed, the program design and equity.

In 2018, members of the University of Florida published their longitudinal research project on the positive development of students who participated in the ESI Miami Music Project. The study assessed social–emotional factors related to the Five Cs of Positive Youth Development—competence, confidence, caring, character, and connection—and found that participants improved significantly in each area during the year of the study.

Another study reported about children's own positive perspectives on their well-being since participating in an ESI program.

A 2025 study at Duke University of El Sistema-inspired youth music education programming focussed on executive function and social–emotional learning. It was conducted in partnership with Kidznotes, a large El Sistema-inspired music education program with several schools in the United States. Investigating the claim that these programs are intended to support the cognitive and social growth of children from underserved communities, the study aimed to find empirical evidence for these claims. Focussing on new kindergarten and first-grade participants, many from low socioeconomic status and non-White backgrounds, the study found no overall gains in executive function or social-emotional skills after one year, though some subgroups did show positive results.

The 2025 study "El Sistema: Music for Sustainability Goals and Education" by two researchers from Kyung Hee University, Seoul, and Gachon University, Republic of Korea, described how El Sistema aligns with and contributes to the United Nations Sustainable Development Goals (SDGs). The analysis covered five case countries where El Sistema has been localized and sustained over time: Scotland, the United States, Sweden, South Korea, and Japan. The study found that ESI programs in the examined countries show alignment with many of the UN's SDGs. Based on these cases, the authors suggest that, under supportive conditions, including localized strategy, stable funding, multi-level governance, systematic evaluation, and even integration with environmental or broader sustainability initiatives, ESI programs can function as a sustainable model of social music education.

== See also ==
- Music education
- Music education for young children
- Jeunesses Musicales International

== Literature ==
- Sperling, Jessica; Lee, Victoria K.; Schmid, Lorrie; Gray, Megan; Kim, Jee Young (December 2025). "A randomized study of El Sistema-inspired youth music education programming: Evidence addressing executive function and social–emotional learning". Psychology of Aesthetics, Creativity, and the Arts. 19 (6): 1332–1344. doi:10.1037/aca0000596. ISSN 1931-390X.
- Cabedo-Mas, Alberto; Moliner-Miravet, Lidón; Campayo-Muñoz, Emilia; Macián-González, Roberto; Arriaga-Sanz, Cristina (May 2023). "Impact of group music-making on social development: a scoping review (El impacto de la práctica musical grupal en el desarrollo social: una revisión exploratoria)". Journal for the Study of Education and Development: Infancia y Aprendizaje. 46 (2): 352–384. doi:10.1080/02103702.2023.2173384. hdl:10234/202690. ISSN 0210-3702.
- Sutherland, Andrew; Southcott, Jane; de Bruin, Leon, eds. (2022). Revolutions in Music Education: Historical and Social Explorations (1 ed.). Rowman & Littlefield. doi:10.5040/9781978729339. ISBN 978-1-9787-2933-9.
- Baker, Geoffrey (12 April 2021). Rethinking Social Action through Music: The Search for Coexistence and Citizenship in Medellín's Music Schools. Cambridge, UK: Open Book Publishers. doi:10.11647/obp.0243. ISBN 978-1-80064-126-6.
- Booth, Eric; Tunstall, Tricia (13 September 2016). Playing for Their Lives: The Global El Sistema Movement for Social Change Through Music. W. W. Norton & Company. ISBN 978-0-393-24565-3.
- Baker, Geoff (14 July 2016). "Before you turn the page: Connecting the parallel worlds of El Sistema and critical research". Revista Internacional de Educación Musical. 4 (4): 51–60. doi:10.12967/RIEM-2016-4-p051-060. ISSN 2307-4841.
- Creech, A., González- Moreno, P., Lorenzino, L., Waitman, G., Sandoval, E., & Fairbanks, S. (2016). El Sistema and Sistema- inspired programmes: A literature review of research, evaluation, and critical debates. Sistema Global.
- Ilari, Beatriz S.; Keller, Patrick; Damasio, Hanna; Habibi, Assal (2016). "The Development of Musical Skills of Underprivileged Children Over the Course of 1 Year: A Study in the Context of an El Sistema-Inspired Program". Frontiers in Psychology. 7: 62. doi:10.3389/fpsyg.2016.00062. ISSN 1664-1078. PMC 4735430. PMID 26869964.
- Márquez, Enrique. "Music Education: History, Global Citizenship, and El Sistema". studylib.net.
- Alemán, X., Duryea, S., Gurerra, N. G., McEwan, P. J., Muñoz, R., Stampini, M., Williamson, A. A. (2016). The effects of musical training on child development: A randomized trial of El Sistema in Venezuela. Prevention Science, 18, 865-878.
- Booth, Eric. "Fundamental Elements of Venezuela's El Sistema". studylib.net.
- Shieh, Eric. 2015. Relationship, rescue, and culture: How El Sistema might work. Oxford Handbook of Social Justice in Music Education, edited by Cathy Benedict, Patrick Schmidt, Gary Spruce, and Paul Woodford, 567–81. New York: Oxford University Press.
- Majno, Maria (2012). "From the model of El Sistema in Venezuela to current applications: learning and integration through collective music education". Annals of the New York Academy of Sciences. 1252 (1): 56–64. Bibcode:2012NYASA1252...56M. doi:10.1111/j.1749-6632.2012.06498.x. ISSN 1749-6632. PMID 22524340.
- Uy, Michael Sy (5 June 2012). "Venezuela's National Music Education Program El Sistema: Its Interactions with Society and Its Participants' Engagement in Praxis". Music and Arts in Action. 4 (1): 5–21. ISSN 1754-7105.
- Tunstall, Tricia (2012). Changing Lives: Gustavo Dudamel, El Sistema, and the Transformative Power of Music, New York: W.W. Norton & Co. ISBN 978-0-393-07896-1
- Hallam, Susan (August 2010). "The power of music: Its impact on the intellectual, social and personal development of children and young people". International Journal of Music Education. 28 (3): 269–289. doi:10.1177/0255761410370658. ISSN 0255-7614.
