= Virtuoso Italia 2005 =

Studio album by the New Brunswick Youth Orchestra
- Released: November 28, 2005
- Recorded: July 7–8, 2005
- Genre: Classical
- Length: 56:56
- Label: Independent
- Producer: Richard Gibson

New Brunswick Youth Orchestra chronology
Première (2003)	Virtuoso Italia 2005 (2005)	Forbidden City Tour (2007)

Virtuoso Italia 2005 is the second album by the New Brunswick Youth Orchestra (NBYO), released on November 28, 2005 (see 2005 in music). Recording of the album took place at the Auditorium Niccolò Paganini, in Parma, Italy. ALL TRACKS CONDUCTED BY PRINCIPAL CONDUCTOR Dr. James Mark.

== Track listing ==
No.	Title	Music	Length
1.	"Overture to La Forza del Destino"	Giuseppe Verdi	7:33
2.	"Je dis que rien ne m'épouvante from Carmen" (Soloist: Sally Dibblee)	Georges Bizet	5:54
3.	"Concertino for Piano and Orchestra, Op. 70" (Soloist: Roger Lord)	Richard Gibson	9:50
4.	"O mio babbino caro from Gianni Schicchi" (Soloist: Sally Dibblee)	Giacomo Puccini	2:21
5.	"The Age of Exploration"	Alasdair MacLean	6:06
6.	"Wabanaki Canoe Song"	MacLean	4:42
7.	"Forest and River / The Island Medley" (À la claire fontaine, Le Prince d'Orange, La rose blanche, Wabanaki Round Dance, Dites-moi donc Mademoiselle)	MacLean	14:20
8.	"Music from Gladiator"	Hans Zimmer, arr. Wasson	6:08

Note: Tracks 5–7 are separate movements of the "St. Croix Island Suite" (MacLean).
