= Forbidden City Tour =

Album by the New Brunswick Youth Orchestra

Studio album by the New Brunswick Youth Orchestra
- Released: October 28, 2007
- Recorded: August 3–4, 2007 at China Central Radio Station in Beijing, People's Republic of China
- Genre: Classical, Acadian, Traditional Chinese
- Length: 65:05
- Label: Independent
- Producer: Richard Gibson

New Brunswick Youth Orchestra chronology
Virtuoso Italia 2005 (2005)	Forbidden City Tour (2007)

Forbidden City Tour (French: La tournée de la Cité interdite, Chinese: 紫禁城游览; pinyin: Zǐjinchéng yóulǎn) is an East Coast Music Award (ECMA)-winning album by the New Brunswick Youth Orchestra (NBYO), released in 2007 (see 2007 in music). It was recorded in summer of 2007 at the Forbidden City in Beijing, China and released on October 28, 2007 at Fredericton High School and is the third album released by the youth orchestra. All tracks were conducted by principal conductor Dr. James Mark.

== Track listing ==
No.	Title	Music	Length
1.	"Overture to Russlan and Ludmilla"	Mikhail Ivanovich Glinka	6:20
2.	"Rákóczy's March from La damnation de Faust, Op. 24"	Hector Berlioz	4:57
3.	"Introduction and Allegro for Strings, Op. 47" (Guest artist: Saint John String Quartet)	Edward Elgar	14:49
4.	"Allegro Appassionato for Piano and Orchestra, Op. 70" (Guest artist: Roger Lord)	Camille Saint-Saëns	6:26
5.	"Saibei Dance, Suite No. 2, Op. 21"	An-lun Huang	4:37
6.	"Dance of Yao People"	Tie-Shuan Liu and Yuan Mao	7:37
7.	"Fantasy On Acadian Reels" (Guest artist: Samantha Robichaud)	Jean-François Mallet	8:30
8.	"Music from the film Jurassic Park"	John Williams, arranged by Calvin Custer	6:08

== Awards and nominations ==
Forbidden City Tour won an East Coast Music Award in 2008 for the Classical Recording of the Year category. The orchestra opened the 2008 show.
