= Stanley Saunders =

Welsh and Canadian conductor (1927–2019)

Stanley Saunders (3 May 1927 – 25 January 2019) was a Welsh and Canadian educator, clarinetist, violinist, and conductor. Born in Newport, Monmouthshire, he was a founding member of the first youth orchestra, the National Youth Orchestra of Wales.

== Life and career ==
Saunders was the conductor of many orchestras, including the Franco-Gallois Orchestra, the University of Guelph Civic Orchestra, and the Brantford Symphony Orchestra, as well as being the first principal conductor of the New Brunswick Youth Orchestra.

Saunders was a recipient of the Queen Elizabeth II Silver Jubilee Medal. He died on 25 January 2019, at the age of 91.

Preceded by Position created	Principal Conductor of the New Brunswick Youth Orchestra; 1965–1968	Succeeded by Kelsey Jones
Preceded by Clayton Hare	Principal Conductor of the New Brunswick Youth Orchestra; 1970–1974	Succeeded by Kenneth Elloway
