= Clayton Hare =

Canadian musician (1909–2001)

Clayton Hare (July 13, 1909 – December 11, 2001) was a Canadian music teacher, conductor, and violinist. He was the third principal conductor of the New Brunswick Youth Orchestra and taught at a number of universities including Mount Allison University, the University of Portland, and Mount Royal College.

== Early life ==
Hare was born in Ontario. He studied violin with Austrian immigrant Géza de Kresz.

== Career ==
As a young man Hare performed as a concert violinist.

Hare joined the music department at Mount Allison University in Sackville New Brunswick, and took over the direction of the Mount Allison College Symphony Orchestra in 1945. In 1949 he founded the Calgary Symphony Orchestra, composed largely of musicians from the Mount Allison music program. The Symphony played a mix of contemporary and classical music. Hare continued to conduct the orchestra for a number of years, while teaching string and orchestral classes at Mount Royal College. He and his wife, pianist Dorothy Swetnam (a survivor of the Halifax Explosion), performed concerts as a duet.

Hare later taught music at the University of Portland. While there he wrote music reviews for the Portland Reporter newspaper.

Preceded by Kelsey Jones	Principal conductor of the New Brunswick Youth Orchestra; 1969–1970	Succeeded by Stanley Saunders
