= Elloway =

Elloway is a surname. Notable people with the surname include:

- Kenneth Elloway (1916–1980), British teacher, musician, and conductor
- Rob Elloway (born 1983), German rugby union player
