= Wayne Riddell =

Canadian organist and conductor

Wayne Riddell CM
- Born: September 10, 1936; Lachute, Quebec, Canada
- Died: November 6, 2022 (aged 86); Montreal, Quebec, Canada
- Occupation(s): Organist, choral conductor, and teacher

Wayne Kerr Riddell CM (September 10, 1936 – November 6, 2022) was a Canadian organist, choral conductor, and teacher.

== Education and early career ==
Born in Lachute, Quebec, he began playing the organ in a local church before studying with Juliette Rodrigue and Kenneth Gilbert at McGill University, where he received a Bachelor of Music in 1960. During his studies, and until well after, he was organist and choirmaster at a number of churches in Montreal, in particular at the Church of St. Andrew and St. Paul, where he became Director of Music. Broadcasts of his Christmas sing-ins were re-broadcast on the European Broadcasting Union for more than 30 years. Under his leadership, the choir won the inaugural Healey Willan Prize for choral performance from the Canada Council for the Arts.

== Professional and teaching career ==
In 1962 he founded The Tudor Singers, a professional choir which toured the United States, Canada, and Europe. The choir premiered a number of contemporary Canadian works by Bruce Mather, Kelsey Jones, Jean Papineau-Couture, and André Gagnon. Riddell also served as chorus master of the Montreal Symphony Orchestra, was guest conductor both of that and other orchestras, and was active as an adjudicator and choral workshop clinician. Initially, he taught in the public school system and at Marianopolis College before joining McGill University's Faculty of Music where he became Director of Choirs in 1969.

== Honours ==
- Named a Member of the Order of Canada 1998, for his contributions to choral music.
- Granted an Honorary D.Mus 2014, McGill University.

== Discography ==
- The choir of the Church of St. Andrew and St. Paul made four LPs under Riddell, including Jubilate (1978, St Andrew & St Paul AP-175), Noël Nouvelet (1979, London LOS-26637), Te Deum (1980, St Andrew & St Paul AP-177) and Magnificat (1984, Savvy CSPS-2371).
- The Tudor Singers of Montreal (1978, Radio Canada International RCI 491)
- The Tudor Singers, CBC Vancouver Orchestra, J. S. Bach Cantatas No.4 & 140 (1984/5, CBC Records SM(CD)5029C)
- Tudor Singers of Montreal, works by Palestrina, Poulenc, Ridout, Morley (1969, CBC SM 86)
