= Première (New Brunswick Youth Orchestra album) =

Studio album by New Brunswick Youth Orchestra
- Released: November 10, 2003
- Recorded: May 31 and June 1, 2003
- Studio: Carnegie Hall
- Genre: Instrumental
- Length: 41:00
- Label: Independent
- Producer: Richard Gibson

New Brunswick Youth Orchestra chronology
Première (2003)	Virtuoso Italia 2005 (2005)

Première is the first studio album by New Brunswick Youth Orchestra. The album was released in November 10, 2003. All tracks were conducted by Principal Conductor Dr. James Mark.

== Origin of name ==
Première means "a first performance", and this album is the first by the NBYO.

== Track listing ==
No.	Title	Music	Length
1.	"Mlada – Procession of the Nobles"	Nikolai Rimsky-Korsakov	4:36
2.	"Finale – Symphony in D minor"	César Franck	10:40
3.	"Prayer and Dream Pantomime – Hansel and Gretel"	Engelbert Humperdinck	8:57
4.	"Carnival Overture"	Oskar Morawetz	6:16
5.	"Symphonic Suite: Lord of the Rings"	Howard Shore	10:31
