= Scholarship and criticism of El Sistema =

Scholarship and criticism of El Sistema music education programs have been published by academic scholars and journalists since the 2010s. Following its founding in Venezuela in 1975, El Sistema has been widely praised as a pioneering model of music education and social inclusion. Notably, it has been credited with offering disadvantaged children access to orchestral training, fostering discipline, and promoting upward social mobility. However, alongside its global acclaim there has been a growing body of critical scholarship that challenges many of the program's foundational claims. Critics argue that the evidence supporting El Sistema's social-transformation narrative has been scant, sometimes based on internal reports or short-term evaluations rather than independent, long-term research.

Scholars including British musicologist Geoffrey Baker have asserted that many evaluations of El Sistema and El Sistema-inspired (ESI) programs in other countries have resulted in advocacy rather than explorative research, raising concerns about methodological rigor, sampling bias, sexual misconduct and over-reliance on participants' own reports. Scholars and journalists have questioned whether the program lives up to its rhetoric of social inclusion, noting that in practice many of its participants do not come from the most socioeconomically disadvantaged groups. Commentators have also criticised prominent conductors associated with El Sistema, including Gustavo Dudamel and others, for maintaining public cooperation with the program while avoiding direct criticism of the Venezuelan government, a stance that has led to allegations of artwashing.

At the same time, empirical studies have found benefits related to musical skill development or psychosocial outcomes among participating children. However, researchers frequently emphasize that these findings are inconclusive without long-term, large-sample, independent evaluations. As a result, the academic debate remains unresolved, highlighting the need for more rigorous and transparent research to determine which claimed outcomes of El Sistema are reliably supported by evidence.

By producing successful orchestral performers, El Sistema has established Venezuela's place on the international classical-music scene. Based on its growing success, there has been wide public appreciation of El Sistema and international ESI-music education programs. The success of the program's graduates and of El Sistema's founder José Antonio Abreu, as well as of ESI local programs, has been highlighted in public newsmedia and specialized music-related publications.

== History of El Sistema ==
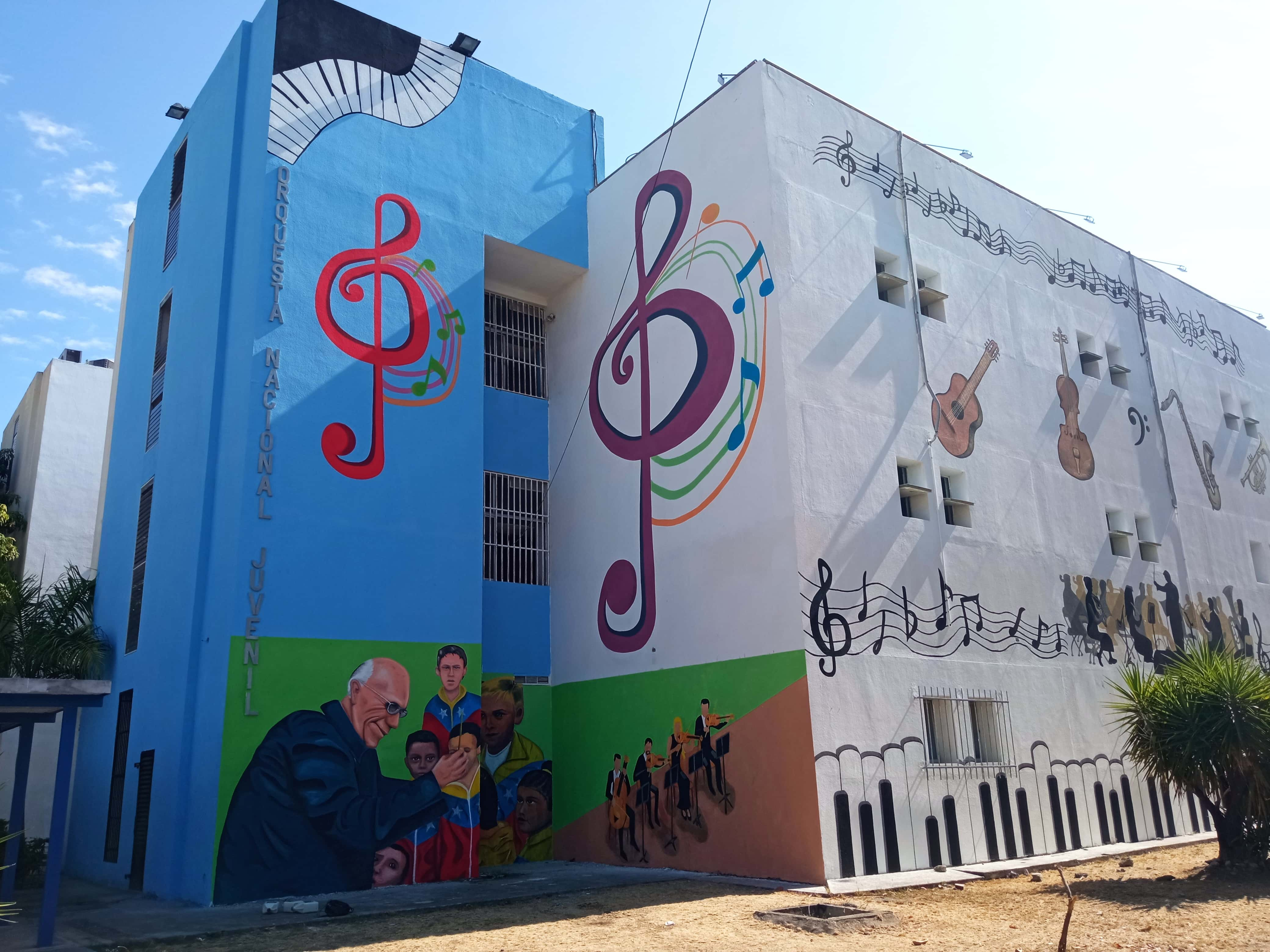
Music center of El Sistema in Maracay, Venezuela

El Sistema in Venezuela and El Sistema-inspired (ESI) programs in other countries are based on community-centered music education. Founded in 1975 by José Antonio Abreu, a Venezuelan educator, musician, and activist, El Sistema is built on the belief that the collective playing of music from an early age fosters personal growth, artistic expression, discipline, teamwork, and social integration.

During the 50 years since its beginnings, millions of children and young people have studied mainly classical music free of charge in El Sistema centers all over Venezuela. Financed by successive governments, El Sistema has created hundreds of orchestras and choirs and the program has received wide international recognition as one of the largest music education programs in the world. Graduates of El Sistema, including Gustavo Dudamel, Edicson Ruiz, Rafael Payare, Ron Davis Alvarez and Natalia Luis-Bassa, have embarked on international careers as conductors, musicians, composers and music educators.

As of 2022, more than 250 world-wide El Sistema-inspired (ESI) programs in all continents were listed by El Sistema Global, a U.S.-based nonprofit organization that supports and connects educators, leaders, and programs sharing basic principles and methods. As one of their key social goals, ESI programs are intended to support the cognitive and social growth of all participating children, including those from underserved communities.

== Scholarship and criticism ==
British musicologist Geoffrey Baker has published two books and several articles about his perceived discrepancy between El Sistema's social impact and ethical principles. In his studies and articles, Baker has referred to ESI programs as "Social Action through Music" (SATM). With regard to the social benefits of the programs, however, Baker and other scholars have claimed that strong empirical evidence for this goal has been scarce and exaggerated. Baker has called El Sistema "one of the largest and most famous music education programs in the world, [that] has spread to dozens of countries."

By producing many orchestral performers, it has established Venezuela's place on the international classical-music scene. Based on its growing success, there has been wide public appreciation in newsmedia and international ESI-music education programs, but much less attention towards scientific studies of the claims and outcomes of its intended Social Action through Music. Studies have cautioned that most "evidence" for ESI programs comes from the program's own reporting, rather than external academic research.

Since 2014, Baker has been writing books, newspaper articles and blogs about the public image of the program and the contradictions he perceived in the actual implementation of El Sistema. Other academic literature has tended to examine ESI-music education more broadly and positively, referring to educational policy and ethics, emotional, social and musical outcomes.

As an overview on studies on programs in Australia, Europe, China, Canada and the U.S. has documented, the cognitive, psychological, musical and social development through music education for children should be investigated in long term studies with detailed descriptions of the learners, the specific programs, and the settings in which they operate.

=== Scholarly research ===
Evaluating 30 relevant articles published published in English between 2010 and 2020, a research team from Queen's University at Kingston, Ontario, published their study "A scoping review of research that examines El Sistema and Sistema-inspired music education". The review noted both reported benefits for students (well-being, social connections, musical learning) as well as important methodological limits of the studies (small samples, short timeframes, inconsistent outcome measuring). The review's summary read as follows:

Overall, the results of this scoping review strongly suggest that Sistema-inspired music education programmes have great potential for positively impacting students, particularly in terms of musical and social-emotional development, with less convincing but nevertheless reasonable evidence of increased academic achievement and cognitive development. The authors conclude that realising the potential of El Sistema and Sistema-inspired programming requires context- and student-specific teaching, curricula, and community support.

— Benjamin Bolden, Sean Corcoran, Alana Butler. Faculty of Education, Queen's University, Kingston, Canada, A scoping review of research that examines El Sistema and Sistema-inspired music education programmes

Further, the findings indicate that Sistema teachers should move toward more learner-centered teaching. This includes encouraging students' creativity, self-expression, and personal agency, reducing the dominant focus on Eurocentric musical traditions, valuing diverse musical styles and cultural backgrounds, and aligning their instructional methods with modern Kindergarten to 12th grade and community-music education practices.

In 2012 Michael Uy from the University of Oxford published his study about the impact of El Sistema and its participants' social engagement as young musicians. Based on five months of investigation in Venezuela, the study examined both the program's advantages and shortcomings, as well as its place within Venezuelan society. It highlighted its connections with students, families, government institutions at different levels, and private enterprises. According to the study, students, parents, teachers, and other community members were given opportunities to participate actively. Thus, they acted not just as recipients, but as contributors: through mentoring, teaching younger students, engaging in parent-run "societies," volunteering, and community work around the núcleos (local teaching centers). The study observed that the program was not explicitly targeting lower-class students, but was open to different kinds of students, regardless of class, ethnicity, or talent, attracting students from different socioeconomic backgrounds.

Critical findings were related to the shortage of qualified adult teachers, which caused a strong realiance on student-teachers and less time for the individual needs of some students. Further, the observed centers were short of quality instruments, insufficient spaces for rehearsal and performance. Referring to the imbalance between students' needs and the rapid growth of the program, the focus on scale and numerical growth partially resulted from state backing, as officials—who are often outside the arts—were seen as prioritizing the number of students reached over the quality or outcomes of the program.

According to the aims of the study, El Sistema was placed in its social context, with observations made regarding its prospects for effective transfer to different cities and countries. In particular, the study argued that for similar programs in other cities or countries to succeed, it was not enough to replicate the musical or technical aspects — fundamental supports are required: public and private funding, community and parent involvement, long-term commitment, and adaptation to local social and historical contexts.

=== Geoffrey Baker's criticism and resulting response ===
In 2014, British musicologist Geoffrey Baker from Royal Holloway, University of London, published his largely negative criticism in the book El Sistema: Orchestrating Venezuela's Youth and an equally critical article in The Guardian. Baker drew his criticism from interviews, observations and documentation gathered over a year in Venezuela. From this, he argued that El Sistema was characterized by authoritarian governance, outdated models of how orchestras work, institutional corruption, and in some cases abusive practices.

In 2021, Baker published another book, titled Rethinking Social Action through Music - The Search for Coexistence and Citizenship in Medellín's Music Schools. In this study of the network of music schools in Medellín, Colombia, Baker looked for answers to the question: "How can we better understand the past, present and future of Social Action through Music (SATM)?"

Among other aspects, Baker critiqued the dominance of the Western classical music in SATM programs such as El Sistema and questioned whether this Eurocentric model serves the aims of music education benefitting social and cultural activities. In particular, he suggested SATM should engage more with local, popular, and indigenous musical traditions, not just classical training. He also raised concerns about dropout rates, the age profile of students, and whether the program was really reaching the communities it claims to serve.

In 2021 the Caracas Chronicles and The Washington Post reported several instances of sexual misconduct and abuse denounced in the Venezuelan MeToo movement. The same year, Baker and others denounced cases of allegedly widespread sexual abuse by teachers of El Sistema. Responding to these allegations, El Sistema expressed "absolute solidarity with the victims and their families" and said it would ask the Public Prosecutor's Office "to support opening investigations of any complaint related to any form of violence or human abuse".

In his 2022 journal article focusing on discrepancies between critical research and the public image of SATM, Baker expanded his criticism of El Sistema and similar programs in other countries. He argued that even though perceived evidence highlights the topic's complexity and ambiguity, the narratives that prevail in cultural policy circles and public forums remain largely simplified and overwhelmingly positive.

Among other critical observations, Baker opined that consistently positive portrayals of SATM had served the interests of key groups. For orchestras and the broader classical music field, it provided a rare success story at a moment of anxiety about declining audiences and revenue, offering a youthful, socially relevant image that institutions could promote. Symphony organizations around the world had adopted SATM for outreach and branding. Music educators, facing their own pressures, likewise embraced a model that claimed to deliver artistic achievement alongside transformative social outcomes in disadvantaged communities — an attractive proposition to funders and governments. The program also helped absorb a surplus of classically trained graduates by creating additional career paths. As Baker argued, these combined incentives had contributed to a general unwillingness to seriously engage with critical scholarship or to question the prevailing positive narrative. In one of his statements, Baker wrote: "Ideas of music and social impact have been thoroughly commodified and are now firmly part of the culture industry."

In his 2025 article commenting on 50 years of El Sistema, Baker reviewed the program's achievements, but also raised similar criticism as before: "El Sistema has displayed both the best and the worst of classical music – and they are intimately connected." In particular, he denounced corruption, abuse, and failures to induce social change. He saw the program's rapid growth after 2000 as inseparable from its increasing political entanglement, leading to propaganda and a form of artwashing used by the Venezuelan government. Referring to continued support for El Sistema by Dudamel and other Venezuelan conductors, Baker called them "influential cheerleaders".

=== Reviews and comments on Baker ===
Reviewing Baker's second book, British music magazine The Strad called it a "ruthlessly honest", "appreciative yet objective" work of "international relevance". Compared to Baker's earlier study of El Sistema in Venezuela, Baker's investigation in Medellín was called "more constructive". The reviewer saw it as an "accurate and illuminating account" and a contribution to understanding the real-world possibilities and limitations of social action through music (SATM).

In her 23-page-long review of 2015, Kathryn Jourdan, a member of the British Journal of Music Education's editorial board and board member of Sistema Scotland, reviewed Baker's book on El Sistema based on her own experience in Scotland and her visit to El Sistema in Venezuela. Jourdan argued that Baker consciously sets out not to give a full, balanced account. Rather, he wanted to give a "counter-weight" to the extant flattering accounts of El Sistema in Venezuela. Jourdan quoted Baker situating his book within the field of activist ethnomusicology and wanting to give voice to those "marginalised in the public realm, rather than those who have dominated it".

As Jourdan noted, Baker found old-fashioned, authoritarian structures and practices which shape young people to become docile workers rather than politically engaged citizens, creating "a microcosm of capitalist society". He insisted that defending social justice needed the critique of oppressive structures and exclusive forces in conventional music education. On the other hand, Jourdan quoted Venezuelan author Carlos M. Añes who found that positive voices from participants, alumni, or international observers received no attention.

Jourdan acknowledged that Baker highlighted aspects of current music education research, including the value of diverse musical forms, reducing hierarchies between genres, giving young people more autonomy in their learning process, and involving them in decision-making and leadership. Baker contrasted these modern aspects with what he saw happening in El Sistema, while Jourdan remarked that many of these aspects have increasingly been emerging in long-established ESI programs. Responding to Baker's doubts about classical music for young people, Jourdan referred to her experience that ESI-programs offer children sustained instrumental training that builds general musical fluency, giving them a foundation to perform a wide range of music. Jourdan cautioned that Baker evaluated El Sistema—and especially the role of its founder, José Antonio Abreu—from the vantage point of someone situated in a secure, well-developed democratic society. From this perspective, she saw Baker as displaying limited appreciation of the difficult political, economic, and social conditions faced in Venezuela.

Ann Drinan from the University of Rochester summarized Baker's criticism and other reports in her 2015 article "An El Sistema Controversy". Among other reports, Drinan quoted Eric Booth, a former faculty member of the Juilliard School and publisher of The Ensemble, a newsletter about the El Sistema USA movement: Booth argued that Baker set out to challenge El Sistema's dominant narrative rather than to offer an even-handed account. Further, he claimed that although Baker labeled his work as research, his approach had been highly selective, often relying on anonymous sources, presenting no statistical evidence, and incorporating general broad criticism of orchestras and conventional music education.

In his 2017 review of Tunstall's 2012 book Changing Lives: Gustavo Dudamel, El Sistema, and the Transformative Power of Music, Jo Miller from the University of Sheffield agreed with Baker that empirical work to corroborate the 'transformative power of music' in the students' communities was missing. Writing about Baker's El Sistema: Orchestrating Venezuela's Youth, Miller calls the book an ethnographic investigation, informed by Baker's approach of "activist ethnomusicology". Miller wrote that one of Baker's central concerns was the lack of critical scrutiny and substantive public discussion surrounding El Sistema. Miller continued that this was largely due to a shared set of convictions among those connected to the organisation, which discourages questioning and debate.

According to Miller, Baker highlighted that El Sistema's major achievement lies in its organizational and policy impact—its ability to secure funding and political backing, bringing the concept of music as social action into global discussion, and creating an unusually prominent platform for music education.

=== Other studies ===
The Venezuelan program is primarily a social inclusive initiative. Yet, such instances of unquestionable musical accomplishment are claimed [...] as successful outcomes of the program's social inclusive agenda. However, no available data comparing social backgrounds with professional ascendency has been found in the course of this research. Furthermore, up to now there have been no empirical studies on the rate of participants that were part of the program.

— Gustavo Borchert, Sistema Scotland: A Critical Inquiry into the Implementation of the El Sistema Model in Raploch.,

In 2011, the Scottish Government published an extensive evaluation of the Big Noise Youth Orchestra in the economically deprived area of Raploch. The research indicated that the program offers a "positive and unique experience" that benefits children and often their families as well. Referring to multiple policy domains—education, justice, health, culture, and community development, Sistema Scotland highlighted eight national priorities, to which the program corresponded. The evaluation found that the program was already contributing to all eight and could strengthen its impact further. It noted that "By being part of an orchestra and through giving public performances, the children‟s confidence grows, they learn to work in a team, to co-operate and contribute effectively to the orchestra."

Writing for the Institute of Education, University College London, Andrea Creech argued that beyond the original El Sistema in Venezuela, the real impact may lie in the nearly 300 El Sistema-inspired programs operating across around 60 countries as of 2014. Among those, the program In Harmony, part of Sistema England, was noted as a successful example, bringing orchestral music education to children who otherwise lack access.

In 2017, a study of the effects of ESI music programs in the United States presented a longitudinal evaluation of programs at multiple sites in the U.S. It found significant musical growth and socioemotional gains of the students, though benefits varied by gender and years of participation. Further, the authors raised questions about how many years of participation are needed, the program design and equity.

In 2018, members of the University of Florida published their longitudinal research project on the positive development of students who participated in the ESI Miami Music Project. The study assessed social–emotional factors related to the Five Cs of Positive Youth Development—competence, confidence, caring, character, and connection—and found that participants improved significantly in each area during the year of the study.

A 2019 study from McGill University in Montreal reported about children's own positive perspectives on their well-being since participating in an ESI program.

A 2025 research article from Duke University, North Carolina, of ESI youth music education programming focussed on executive function and social–emotional learning. It was conducted in partnership with Kidznotes, a large ESI music education program with several schools in the United States. Investigating the claim that these programs are intended to support the cognitive and social growth of children from underserved communities, the study aimed to find empirical evidence for these claims. Focusing on kindergarten and first-grade participants, many from low socioeconomic status and non-White backgrounds, the study found no overall gains in cognitive processes or social-emotional skills after one year, even though some subgroups did show positive results.

The 2025 study "El Sistema: Music for Sustainability Goals and Education" by two researchers from Kyung Hee University, Seoul, and Gachon University, Republic of Korea, described how El Sistema aligns with and contributes to the United Nations Sustainable Development Goals (SDGs). The analysis covered five case countries where El Sistema has been localized and sustained over time: Scotland, the United States, Sweden, South Korea, and Japan. The study found that ESI programs in the examined countries show alignment with many of the UN's SDGs. Based on these cases, the authors suggest that, under supportive conditions, including localized strategy, stable funding, multi-level governance, systematic evaluation, and even integration with environmental or broader sustainability initiatives, ESI programs can function as a sustainable model of social music education.

=== Articles in public media ===
In her article of 2006, writer Charlotte Higgins described her visit to a musical center of El Sistema in Sarria, a crime-ridden suburb of Caracas. Based on her impressions and interviews, she described how the program provides free, intensive musical training to hundreds of thousands of children, many from impoverished backgrounds. She highlighted the program's ensemble-based approach, state funding, and mission of social inclusion. Higgins noted that the program was funded by the Venezuelan state (then about US $29 million per year) and has become a national success story, with youth orchestras sometimes accompanying the president on official trips.

In a 2007 article about Abreu, Dudamel and El Sistema published in The Guardian, British conductor Simon Rattle was quoted calling Dudamel "the most astonishingly gifted conductor he has ever met". Also, the article claimed that Dudamel "grew up in poverty", whereas other reliable sources merely described his growing up in a musical family.

In 2014, The Guardian published an article about Baker's criticism of El Sistema as well as opposite views denying this criticism. Marshall Marcus, former Head of Music at the Southbank Centre and later Chair of Sistema Europe, supported Baker's view that El Sistema's social impact deserved closer investigation and agreed that rigorous, well-designed research and evaluation of the program was both necessary and valuable. Referring to El Sistema's achievements, Marcus was quoted saying:

I think that El Sistema in Venezuela has provided a route to social development for huge numbers of Venezuelan children and young people. I have personally seen this development in certain Venezuelans over a period of years with my own eyes.

In 2016, Stanford Thompson, the Executive Director of the ESI program Play On, Philly in Philadelphia, Pennsilvaina, and founding Board Chairman of El Sistema USA, published his comments on a critical review in the Washington Post of the book Playing for Their Lives: The Global El Sistema Movement for Social Change Through Music. Referring to the accomplishments of ESI-related programs Thompson wrote that people involved in these programs did not view El Sistema as a universal solution, nor did they expect music instruction to resolve the deep structural problems affecting underserved families. What they recognized was that meaningful change "is made through a lot of hard work, dedication and persistence." Further, Thompson stated:

Every day, our students' practice with instruments helps them practice these skills: the regulation of complex cognitive processes like working memory, reasoning, flexibility, and problem solving as well as planning and execution. We know that those who possess these skills will out-perform those who don't have them and we are confident that learning to play music is the best way for our young people to acquire them.

— Stanford Thompson, The "Cult" of El Sistema Keeps Playing On In a Different Key

In 2025, Venezuelan pianist Gabriela Montero described how El Sistema had become a tool of political propaganda of the Venezuelan government. She insisted that the youth orchestra system could not be separated from Venezuela's social and political reality — including serious human-rights abuses — and so cannot be defended as an isolated cultural phenomenon. Montero clarified she does not call for closing down El Sistema, but for concert halls and institutions to refuse collaborating with what she sees as a propaganda tool of a corrupt regime. The Guardian quoted Geoffrey Baker saying ""El Sistema is essentially a political organisation […] because it's run out of the office of the president and its board of directors includes high-profile politicians including Nicolás Maduro's son and Delcy Rodríguez".

Following Montero's article, the Venezuelan newspaper El Nacional reported some of their readers' reactions on social media. One of them wrote on X (formerly Twitter):

I don't understand the logic of boycotting El Sistema. There is no real political gain or effect, it does not politically or economically hurt the ruling elite, and sacrifices the careers of a bunch of apolitical symphony musicians trapped in the ups and downs of the Venezuelan state.

— Tony Frangie Mawad, Venezuelan journalist

== See also ==
- Music education
- Music education for young children

== Literature ==
- Cabedo-Mas, Alberto; Moliner-Miravet, Lidón; Campayo-Muñoz, Emilia; Macián-González, Roberto; Arriaga-Sanz, Cristina (May 2023). "Impact of group music-making on social development: a scoping review (El impacto de la práctica musical grupal en el desarrollo social: una revisión exploratoria)". Journal for the Study of Education and Development: Infancia y Aprendizaje. 46 (2): 352–384. doi:10.1080/02103702.2023.2173384. hdl:10234/202690. ISSN 0210-3702.
- Baker, Geoffrey (2021-04-12). Rethinking Social Action through Music: The Search for Coexistence and Citizenship in Medellín's Music Schools. Cambridge, UK: Open Book Publishers. doi:10.11647/obp.0243. ISBN 978-1-80064-126-6.
- Booth, Eric; Tunstall, Tricia (2016-09-13). Playing for Their Lives: The Global El Sistema Movement for Social Change Through Music. W. W. Norton & Company. ISBN 978-0-393-24565-3.
- Baker, Geoff (2016-07-14). "Before you turn the page: Connecting the parallel worlds of El Sistema and critical research". Revista Internacional de Educación Musical. 4 (4): 51–60. doi:10.12967/RIEM-2016-4-p051-060. ISSN 2307-4841.
- Creech, A., González- Moreno, P., Lorenzino, L., Waitman, G., Sandoval, E., & Fairbanks, S. (2016). El Sistema and Sistema- inspired programmes: A literature review of research, evaluation, and critical debates. Sistema Global.
- Ilari, Beatriz S.; Keller, Patrick; Damasio, Hanna; Habibi, Assal (2016). "The Development of Musical Skills of Underprivileged Children Over the Course of 1 Year: A Study in the Context of an El Sistema-Inspired Program". Frontiers in Psychology. 7: 62. doi:10.3389/fpsyg.2016.00062. ISSN 1664-1078. PMC 4735430. PMID 26869964.
- Márquez, Enrique. "Music Education: History, Global Citizenship, and El Sistema". studylib.net.
- Alemán, X., Duryea, S., Gurerra, N. G., McEwan, P. J., Muñoz, R., Stampini, M., Williamson, A. A. (2016). The effects of musical training on child development: A randomized trial of El Sistema in Venezuela. Prevention Science, 18, 865-878.
- Booth, Eric. "Fundamental Elements of Venezuela's El Sistema". studylib.net.
- Shieh, Eric. 2015. Relationship, rescue, and culture: How El Sistema might work. Oxford Handbook of Social Justice in Music Education, edited by Cathy Benedict, Patrick Schmidt, Gary Spruce, and Paul Woodford, 567–81. New York: Oxford University Press.
- Majno, Maria (2012). "From the model of El Sistema in Venezuela to current applications: learning and integration through collective music education". Annals of the New York Academy of Sciences. 1252 (1): 56–64. Bibcode:2012NYASA1252...56M. doi:10.1111/j.1749-6632.2012.06498.x. ISSN 1749-6632. PMID 22524340.
- Uy, Michael Sy (2012-06-05). "Venezuela's National Music Education Program El Sistema: Its Interactions with Society and Its Participants' Engagement in Praxis". Music and Arts in Action. 4 (1): 5–21. ISSN 1754-7105.
- Tunstall, Tricia (2012). Changing Lives: Gustavo Dudamel, El Sistema, and the Transformative Power of Music, New York: W.W. Norton & Co. ISBN 978-0-393-07896-1
- Hallam, Susan (August 2010). "The power of music: Its impact on the intellectual, social and personal development of children and young people". International Journal of Music Education. 28 (3): 269–289. doi:10.1177/0255761410370658. ISSN 0255-7614.
