= Staatskapelle Dresden =

German orchestra based in Dresden

- Orchestra
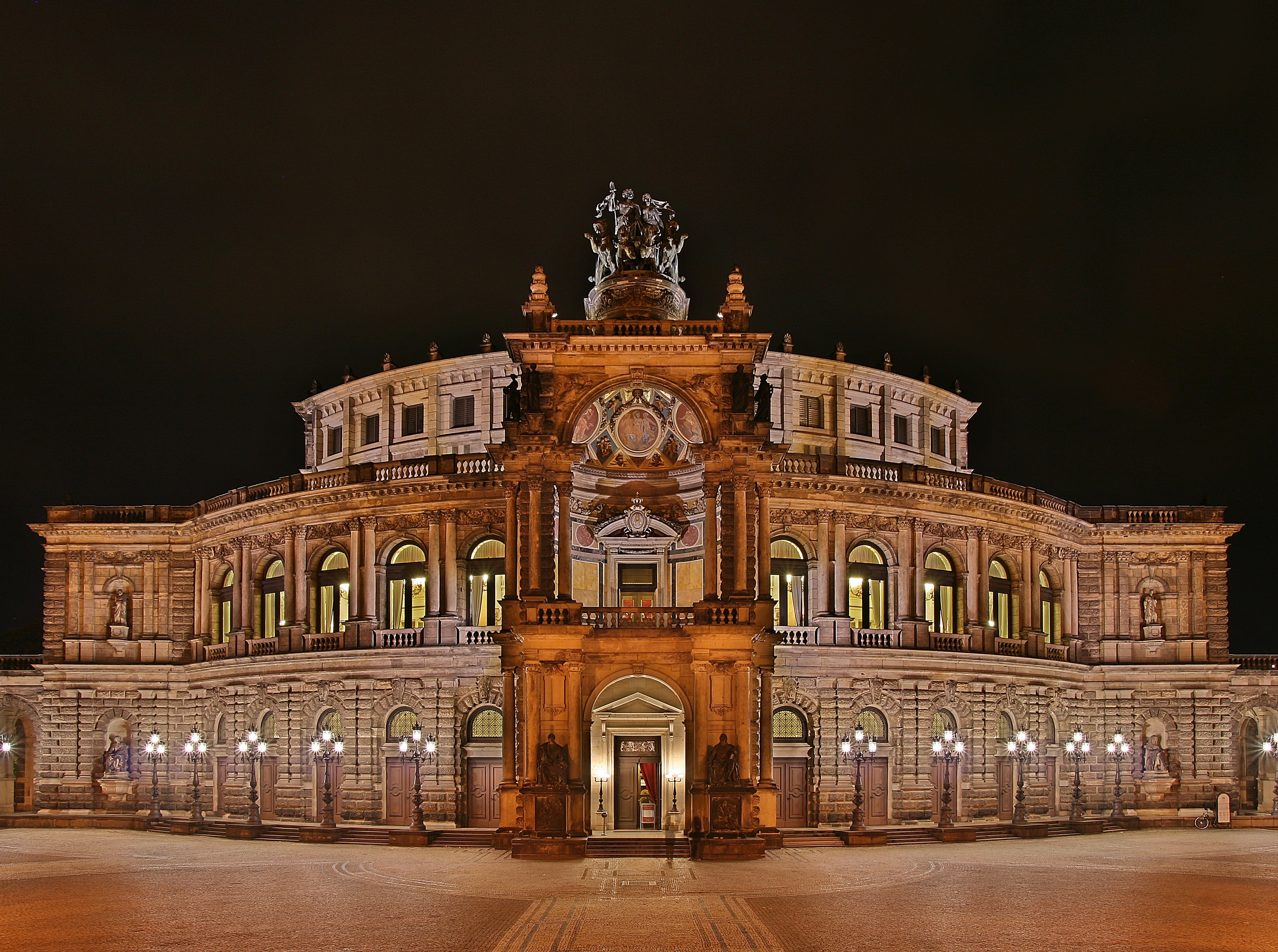
- Founded: 1548
- Location: Dresden, Germany
- Concert hall: Semperoper
- Principal conductor: Daniele Gatti
- Website: www.staatskapelle-dresden.de

The Sächsische Staatskapelle Dresden (German pronunciation: [ˈzɛksɪʃə ˈʃtaːtskaˌpɛlə ˈdʁeːsdn̩]), or Saxon State Orchestra Dresden, is one of the oldest orchestras in the world, created by order of Maurice, Elector of Saxony in 1548. Under communist East Germany and until 1992 it was called Staatskapelle Dresden; an earlier name was Kurfürstlich-Sächsische und Königlich-Polnische Kapelle, or Electoral Saxon and Royal Polish Orchestra. It is a constituent body of the Semper Opera House, along with two choruses and a ballet troupe, where it plays in the pit for opera and on a platform for its own concert series.

== History ==
Heinrich Schütz was associated with the orchestra early in its existence. In the 19th century, Carl Maria von Weber and Richard Wagner each served as Hofkapellmeister.

In the 20th century, Richard Strauss became closely associated with the orchestra as both conductor and composer, which premiered several of his works. Karl Böhm and Hans Vonk were notable among the orchestra's chief conductors in that they served as chief conductors of both the Sächsische Staatskapelle Dresden and the State Opera simultaneously. Herbert Blomstedt was musical director of the Staatskapelle from 1975 to 1985, and now has the title of Ehrendirigent (honorary conductor) with the orchestra. Hiroshi Wakasugi had served as a regular conductor with the orchestra since 1982, and was elected as the successor to Hans Vonk, but the reunification of West Germany and East Germany caused the contract to be annulled.

Giuseppe Sinopoli was chief conductor from 1992 until his sudden death in 2001. Bernard Haitink replaced him in August 2002, but resigned in 2004 over disputes with the Staatskapelle's Intendant, Gerd Uecker, on the orchestra's choice of successor. In August 2007 Fabio Luisi began his tenure as chief conductor after having been appointed as far back as January 2004. He shared with Böhm and Vonk the historic distinction of being chief conductor of both the Sächsische Staatskapelle Dresden and the Sächsische Staatsoper simultaneously. Luisi was scheduled to step down as chief conductor in 2012 in accord with the October 2009 announcement of Christian Thielemann as the orchestra's next chief conductor, effective with the 2012–2013 season. However, Luisi resigned as chief conductor of the Staatskapelle in February 2010, effective immediately, after reports that the management had secured a contract with the ZDF network for a scheduled televised concert on New Year's Eve 2011 without consulting him at all in his capacity as the orchestra's GMD. Thielemann was initially contracted with the orchestra through 2019. In November 2017, the orchestra announced the extension of Thielemann's contract as chief conductor through 31 July 2024. In May 2021, Barbara Klepsch, the Culture Minister of Saxony, announced that Thielemann is to conclude his tenure with the Staatskapelle Dresden at the close of his current contract, at the end of July 2024.

Sir Colin Davis held the title of 'conductor laureate' from 1990 until his death in 2013, the first and only to-date conductor to be granted this title by the orchestra. The orchestra named Myung-Whun Chung as its first-ever principal guest conductor, effective as of the 2012–2013 season.

In 2007, the orchestra inaugurated the post of Capell-Compositeur or composer-in-residence, with each appointed composer installed for one concert season. The first Capell-Compositeur was Isabel Mundry. Sofia Gubaidulina was Capell-Compositrice for the 2014–2015 and 2016–2017 seasons, the first composer to hold the title more than once. Arvo Pärt held the title of Capell-Compositeur for the 2017–2018 season. The orchestra featured Sinopoli as its Capell-Compositeur for the 2020–2021 season as a posthumous tribute.

In April 2007, the European Cultural Foundation awarded the orchestra a prize "zur Bewahrung des musikalischen Weltkulturerbes" (for preservation of the world's musical heritage"). In June 2011, the orchestra was announced as the new resident orchestra of the Salzburg Easter Festival, as of 2013.

In 2000, Daniele Gatti first guest-conducted the orchestra. In June 2022, the orchestra announced its election of Gatti as its next chief conductor, effective in 2024.

The orchestra received the Herbert von Karajan Prize in 2022 and donated the prize money of 50,000 euros to the project Musaik – Grenzenlos musizieren.

== Kapellmeister and chief conductors ==
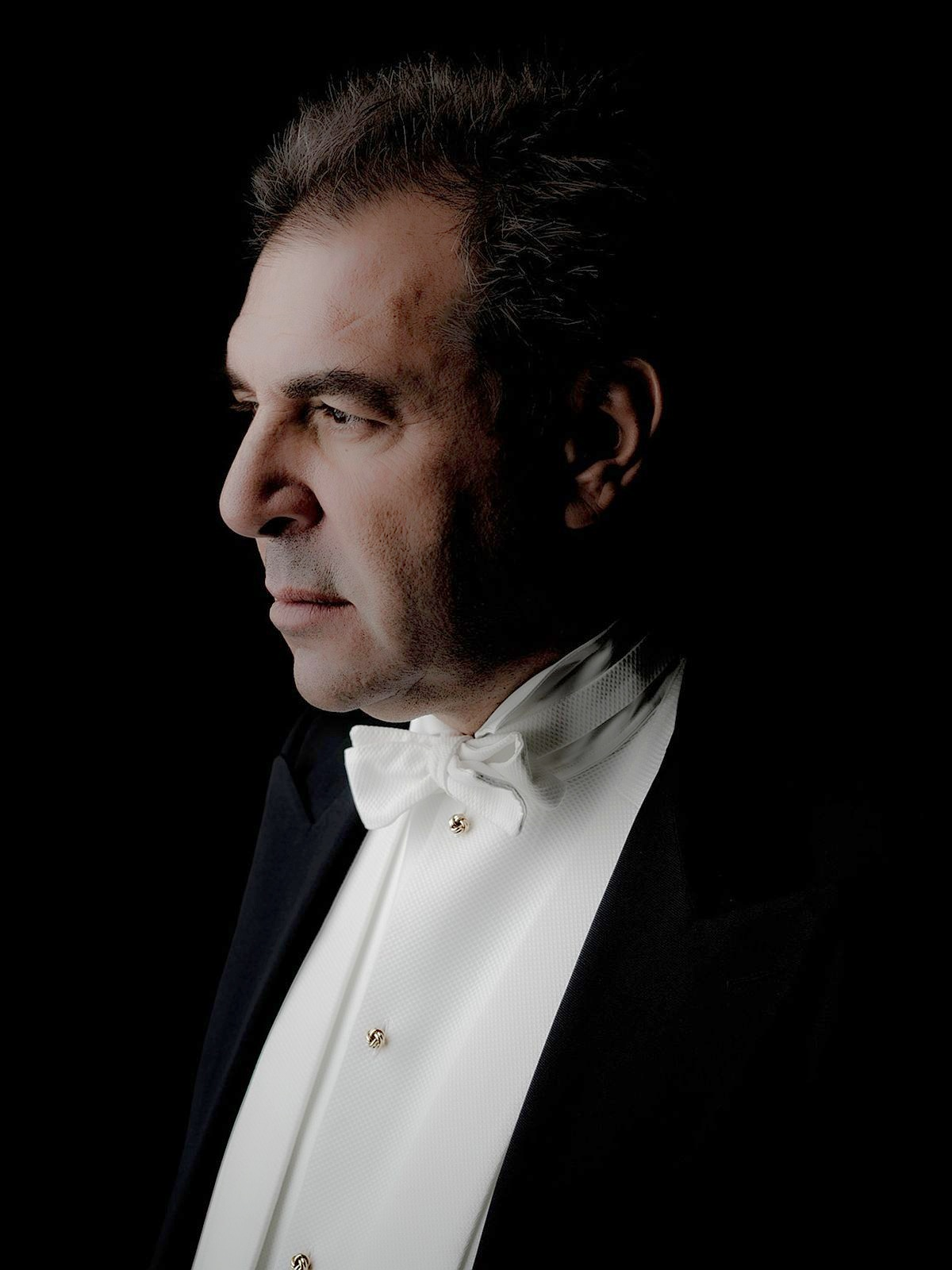
Daniele Gatti (2017)

- Johann Walter (1548–1554)
- Mattheus Le Maistre (1555–1568)
- Antonio Scandello (1568–1580)
- Giovanni Battista Pinelli (1580–1584)
- Rogier Michael (1587–1619)
- Heinrich Schütz (1615–1672, Hofkapellmeister)
- Vincenzo Albrici (1654–1680)
- Giovanni Andrea Bontempi (1656–1680)
- Carlo Pallavicini (1666–1688)
- Nicolaus Adam Strungk (1688–1700, Hofkapellmeister)
- Johann Christoph Schmidt (1697–1728, Hofkapellmeister)
- Antonio Lotti (1717–1719)
- Johann David Heinichen (1717–1729)
- Giovanni Alberto Ristori (1725–1733)
- Johann Adolph Hasse (1733–1763, Hofkapellmeister)
- Johann Gottlieb Naumann (1776–1801, Hofkapellmeister)
- Ferdinando Paer (1802–1806, Hofkapellmeister)
- Francesco Morlacchi (1810–1841, Hofkapellmeister)
- Carl Maria von Weber (1816–1826, Hofkapellmeister)
- Carl Gottlieb Reißiger (1826–1859, Hofkapellmeister)
- Richard Wagner (1843–1848, Hofkapellmeister)
- Karl August Krebs (1850–1880)
- Julius Rietz (1874–1877)
- Franz Wüllner (1877–1884)
- Ernst von Schuch (1884–1914)
- Fritz Reiner (1914–1921)
- Fritz Busch (1922–1933)
- Karl Böhm (1934–1943)
- Karl Elmendorff (1943–1944)
- Joseph Keilberth (1945–1950)
- Rudolf Kempe (1949–1953)
- Franz Konwitschny (1953–1955)
- Lovro von Matačić (1956–1958)
- Otmar Suitner (1960–1964)
- Kurt Sanderling (1964–1967)
- Martin Turnovský (1966–1968)
- Herbert Blomstedt (1975–1985)
- Hans Vonk (1985–1990)
- Giuseppe Sinopoli (1992–2001)
- Bernard Haitink (2002–2004)
- Fabio Luisi (2007–2010)
- Christian Thielemann (2012–2024)
- Daniele Gatti (2024–present)

=== Conductors laureate ===
- Herbert Blomstedt (2016–2026)
- Christian Thielemann

=== Principal Guest Conductors ===
- Myung-Whun Chung (2012–2026)

== Capell-Compositeur ==
- Isabel Mundry (2007–2008)
- Bernhard Lang (2008–2009)
- Rebecca Saunders (2009–2010)
- Johannes Maria Staud (2010–2011)
- Lera Auerbach (2011–2012)
- Hans Werner Henze (2012–2013)
- Wolfgang Rihm (2013–2014)
- Sofia Gubaidulina (2014–2015)
- György Kurtág (2015–2016)
- Sofia Gubaidulina (2016–2017)
- Arvo Pärt (2017–2018)
- Péter Eötvös (2018–2019)
- Aribert Reimann (2019–2020)
- Giuseppe Sinopoli (2020–2021, posthumous)
- Matthias Pintscher (2021–2022)
- Olga Neuwirth (2022–2023)
- Georg Friedrich Haas (2023–2024)
- Unsuk Chin (2025–2026)
- Jörg Widmann (2026–2027)

== Capell-Virtuos ==
- Frank Peter Zimmermann (2024–2025)
- Gautier Capuçon (2025–2026)
- Jörg Widmann (2026–2027)
