= Gone with the Wind (musical) =

- Poster for Original London production
- Music: Margaret Martin
- Lyrics: Margaret Martin
- Book: Margaret Martin
- Basis: Gone with the Wind by Margaret Mitchell; Gone with the Wind by Sidney Howard
- Productions: 2008 West End

Gone with the Wind is a musical written by Margaret Martin. It was adapted by Trevor Nunn from Margaret Mitchell's 1936 novel of the same name and its 1939 film adaptation.

The production began previews on 5 April 2008 and officially opened at the New London Theatre in London's West End on 22 April 2008. The production was directed by Nunn and featured sets by John Napier and costumes by Andreane Neofitu. Darius Danesh and Jill Paice starred as Rhett Butler and Scarlett O'Hara respectively. The show was produced by Aldo Scrofani, Colin Ingram, Gary McAvay and the Nederlander Producing Company. The production closed on 14 June 2008, after 79 performances.

== Background ==
This was not the first musical version of Gone with the Wind. A musical adaptation by Harold Rome played a year at the Drury Lane Theatre in 1972, starring June Ritchie as Scarlett, and featuring Bonnie Langford. Margaret Martin, a newcomer to songwriting and playwriting, contacted the Stephen Mitchell Trust, sending tapes of songs and a draft script, and the Trust eventually agreed to give her the rights to make an adaptation of Gone with the Wind. At about the same time, Martin learned that Nunn was extremely interested in American history, and she sent him the materials as well. They collaborated on revisions over the next couple of years, which resulted in a workshop production in London in 2004. With the support of the Mitchell Trust and producer Aldo Scrofani of Columbia Artists Theatricals, plans began forming for the West End production. Plans for the production were officially confirmed in 2007.

Producer Scrofani said in interviews that their hope was that "this theatrical adaptation will cause our audiences to rediscover this timeless and rich story, while also providing each of them a meaningful and memorable experience". Nunn said that "having now worked on adapting two vast novels for the stage, Nicholas Nickleby and Les Misérables, I am drawn to the challenge of telling Margaret Mitchell's epic story through words, music and the imaginative resources of the theatre."

After opening to poor reviews and criticism of the length of the show, the producers announced that the show would be cut from its original running time of 3½ hours, and they reduced the running time to 3 hours 10 minutes including interval. Producer Scrofani announced that the production would close on 14 June 2008, after 79 performances, adding that "plans for a New York production are currently on hold."

== Synopsis ==
=== Act I ===
In 1861 Atlanta, Georgia, 16-year-old Scarlett is the eldest of three daughters living a life of luxury on their father's plantation, Tara. The slaves are working ("Born to be Free"), and Scarlett discovers that Ashley Wilkes, who she secretly loves, is to marry his cousin, Melly Hamilton. Scarlett's father returns home ("On Your Land"), and the family hold evening prayers ("Ellen's Prayer").

Scarlett dresses for the barbecue at the Wilkes' plantation. The guests arrive ("Gentle People"), and they speculate about dashing Rhett Butler's past. Scarlett flirts with every man to try to get Ashley's attention. Charles Hamilton, Melly's brother, falls in love with Scarlett, while the women pass judgement on her ("She's No Lady"). The men talk about the War, and Rhett states his opinion. Ashley finds Scarlett in the library. She tells him that she loves him, he replies that he cares for her ("Softly"), but is to be married. As Ashley leaves, Scarlett sees that Rhett has been in the library and has overheard, telling her she's "no lady" ("She's No Lady" (reprise)). Outside, Charles Hamilton tells her that war has been declared, and as she cannot have Ashley, she agrees to marry him. The men are excited at the prospect of War ("Come Join the Troop"). The couples marry, and both Charles and Ashley join the War. She receives news of Charles' death, and in due time, their son Wade is born. Scarlett is upset to be a widow with a baby, and her family send her to Atlanta to the home of Aunt Pittypat.

In Atlanta, Scarlett is introduced to the society ladies ("The Very Best People"). The Hamilton ladies are still in mourning for Charles, but they help at the bazaar to raise war funds. Rhett arrives ("I'm Your Man"), and Dr. Meade proposes an auction, with the men bidding to lead the dances with the lady of their choice. Rhett bids for Scarlett and scandalises society as he dances with her while she is still in mourning. Mr. O'Hara hears about the scandal and wants to bring Scarlett home, but Scarlett blackmails her father into letting her stay; she wishes that she could be "Scarlett O'Hara Again".

In 1863, Rhett brings news from the War and gives out the casualty lists; there are many men dead, and the women of the city lament ("Can This Be All?") Ashley comes home on leave, and Scarlett promises him that she'll look after Melly; he kisses her as he leaves. At Mrs. Elsing's home, Rhett questions the War, and Melly defends him as he has the same opinion as Ashley. Melly is pregnant, but news arrives that Ashley is missing.

The fighting closes in on Atlanta, but Melly cannot be moved in her condition, and Scarlett has to stay with her. Prissy says that she can help out with the birth. Rhett asks Scarlett to be his mistress ("I'm Your Man" (reprise)), but she refuses. Melly goes into labour, but the doctor is busy with wounded soldiers. Prissy knows nothing about childbirth, so Scarlett is left to deliver the baby herself. The Yankee army is very near, so Prissy finds Rhett, and they all flee the burning city. Outside Atlanta, stung by Scarlett's words, Rhett goes off to join the army, kissing her as he leaves. Scarlett makes her way back to Tara, but discovers that her mother has died, and her father is mad with grief. She walks to Ashley's plantation, but finds it in ruins. The life she once knew is gone forever ("Gone With The Wind").

=== Act II ===
With the declaration that the slaves within the Confederacy are freed ("Born to be Free" (reprise)), everything is in scarce supply during 1864. Scarlett says that everyone must work the fields. She shoots and kills a Yankee thief at Tara before ransacking his belongings with Melly ("Desperate Times"). In 1865, the War is over and Ashley makes his way home. With Reconstruction after the War, the taxes on Tara have increased. Ashley tells Scarlett the world has passed him by, and only Rhett has money now. Scarlett says that they should run away together. Ashley refuses but admits that he loves her. Scarlett plans to find Rhett and get the money from him.

In Atlanta, Scarlett visits Rhett in gaol and tries to pretend that all is well, but he sees her rough hands and realises that she wants money. Scarlett offers to become his mistress, but Rhett refuses as he hasn't any money in Atlanta, and he knows her too well ("Nobody Knows You"). Scarlett thinks Tara is lost, but on her way home, she meets Frank Kennedy. He boasts of his business and wealth, and seeing him as a way to save Tara, Scarlett lies that Suellen is marrying another. Two weeks later, Scarlett marries Frank and pays the taxes for Tara. Scarlett runs Frank's businesses, but the gossips of Atlanta think her behaviour is wrong. Prissy opines that the world has changed since the War ("I'm Gonna Find My Own").

It is now 1866, and Scarlett hears that her father has died ("On Your Land" (reprise)). Ashley wants to leave Tara, but Scarlett persuades Melly that they must come to Atlanta instead. Scarlett bears Frank's daughter, Ella, and she still runs the businesses despite the danger of travelling alone. Scarlett is attacked while passing the shanty town; Ashley and Frank leave to exact revenge. Men come looking to arrest Ashley for the Klan raid, as Rhett arrives home with Ashley, apparently drunk, with a false alibi about spending the evening with a prostitute. Rhett tells Scarlett that her husband was killed, but Scarlett is more worried about Ashley being injured. As Frank lies in his coffin, Scarlett is drunk, and she agrees to marry Rhett. The slaves celebrate their freedom ("Wings of a Dove"), but they have misgivings about some of the changes.

Scarlett and Rhett return from their honeymoon with gifts, including a petticoat for Mammy, who declares she won't wear it as she does not like Captain Butler. Ashley cannot run Scarlett's mill at a profit, and she tells him he should use convict labour. Ashley cannot bear to see how brutal Scarlett has become, and he blames Rhett. Scarlett realises that Ashley still loves her, and she tells Rhett that she will no longer share a bedroom with him. Rhett says that this is no hardship to him; he is then seen with other women. Scarlett invites her old and new friends to her 'crush' ("Reconstruction Bounty"), but her old friends criticise her and leave. A drunken Rhett argues with Scarlett about Ashley, saying that tonight, instead of three people, there'll be "Just Two!" as he forcefully takes her to his bed. The next morning, Rhett has gone, but Scarlett realises that he loves her. Later, she is dismayed to find that she is pregnant again, but Rhett is delighted.

In 1867, Scarlett gives birth to a girl, Bonnie. Mammy finally accepts Captain Butler and wears the petticoat. Rhett restores his reputation with society for Bonnie's sake. Bonnie has nightmares and is afraid of the dark, so Rhett sings a lullaby ("Once Upon a Time"). Scarlett tells Mammy that she wants to love Bonnie, but the child only cares for her father ("Every Child"). By 1871, Bonnie is learning to ride her pony, but when she tries to take a jump, she is thrown to the ground. Bonnie dies, and Scarlett blames Rhett. In his grief, he refuses to bury her as she was afraid of the dark, and it takes kind words from Melly to comfort him. Rhett says a final goodbye to Bonnie ("Once Upon a Time" (reprise)). Scarlett feels all alone, and Rhett feels like a stranger ("Alone").

Despite apparent infertility due to the trauma of Beau's birth, Melly becomes pregnant again, but miscarries and becomes gravely ill. On her deathbed, she tells Scarlett to look after Ashley, and to be kind to Rhett as he helped her with money without Ashley knowing. Outside, Scarlett realises that Ashley loves Melly, and he never loved her. She runs home, telling Rhett that she must have loved him for years. But she is too late; he says it is over. Scarlett asks him what she will do if he goes, but as he leaves, he says that he doesn't "give a damn". Scarlett decides to return to Tara, knowing that she will win Rhett back somehow as tomorrow is another day ("Gone With The Wind" (reprise)).

== Differences from the novel and film ==
The musical's story is generally more faithful to the novel than the film, with Scarlett's three children appearing, unlike the film, which portrayed only Bonnie. One character not included on stage is Belle Watling, the prostitute. The slaves have a greater voice, especially Prissy, whose character is different from the film or novel, as she sings of finding her own way in the world and teaching others.

== Roles and original principal cast ==
- Rhett Butler – Darius Danesh
- Scarlett O'Hara – Jill Paice
- Ashley Wilkes – Edward Baker-Duly
- Melanie Hamilton – Madeleine Worrall
- Mammy – NaTasha Yvette Williams
- Prissy – Jina Burrows
- Gerald O'Hara – Julian Forsyth
- Ellen O'Hara / Mrs. Elsing – Susannah Fellows
- Pork – Ray Shell
- Dilcey – Jacqueline Boatswain
- Uncle Peter – Leon Herbert
- Big Sam – Chris Jarman
- Mrs. Merryweather – Susan Tracy
- John Wilkes / Dr. Meade – Jeff Shankley
- Mrs. Meade – Kathryn Akin
- Aunt Pittypat – Susan Jane Tanner
- Frank Kennedy – Alan Vicary
- Charles Hamilton – David Roberts
- Suellen O'Hara – Emily Bryant
- Careen O'Hara – Gemma Sutton
- Stuart Tarleton – Gareth Chart
- Brent Tarleton – Tom Sellwood
- Cade Calvert – Alan Winner
- Bonnie – Leilah de Meza
- Wade Hamilton – Mischa Goodman, Gene Goodman & Guy Whitby

== Musical numbers ==
Act I

- "Born to be Free"
- "On Your Land"
- "Ellen's Prayer"
- "Gentle People"
- "She's No Lady"
- "Always In My Mind"
- "Come Join the Troop"
- "The Very Best People"
- "I'm Your Man"
- "Scarlett O'Hara Again"
- "Can This Be All?"
- "I'm Your Man" (reprise)
- "Gone With The Wind"

Act II

- "Born to be Free" (reprise)
- "Desperate Times"
- "Nobody Knows You"
- "I'm Gonna Find My Own"
- "On Your Land" (reprise)
- "Wings of a Dove"
- "Reconstruction Bounty"
- "Just Two!"
- "Once Upon a Time"
- "Every Child"
- "Once Upon a Time" (reprise)
- "Alone"
- "Ellen's Prayer" (reprise)
- "Gone With The Wind" (reprise)

When the musical opened, it contained two additional songs in Act II: "Abundantly Present" and "This Time". These, and several reprises, were cut in May 2008.

== Critical response ==
Reviews of the musical were generally negative. Critics found fault with the work's structure and score, stating "the large ensemble combines dialogue with passages of narration from the novel. The songs seem constantly to interrupt the proceedings rather than deepening or advancing the narrative." However, Paul Taylor of The Independent noted that "the score is enriched with spirituals, blues and gospel music, spine-tinglingly well-sung by such cast members as Natasha Yvette Williams's loveably sassy Mammy and Jina Burrows' Prissy." Taylor also praised Danesh and Paice: "The diabolically dashing Darius Danesh brings a seductively insolent charm, a dark velvet voice and a genuine, fugitive pathos to the cynical blockade runner. If Jill Paice hasn't quite nailed the comic, outrageously feline wiliness of Scarlett, she boasts the bright, soaring vocal quality to convey the heroine's indomitable survivor's drive." Christopher Hart of The Sunday Times wrote, "Frankly, I fear, you won't give a damn."
