= Margaret Martin (doctor of public health) =

- Born: April 15, 1954 (age 71)
- Education: DrPH, Doctor of Public Health
- Alma mater: University of California Los Angeles; Los Angeles City College
- Occupation: Public health
- Known for: Founder of Harmony Project

Margaret Martin (born April 15, 1954) is the founder of the Harmony Project and was awarded the Presidential Citizens Medal in 2011 by the President Barack Obama for her work on the project.

== Career ==
She is the author of The Illustrated Book of Pregnancy and Childbirth, which provides a simple way to understand the body of a woman, the development of a fetus in the womb, breastfeeding and other aspects of childbirth. She later published an update of her first book, entitled "Pregnancy & Childbirth: The Basic Illustrated Guide”. Dr. Martin is the author, composer, and lyricist of the musical Gone with the Wind.

Martin has worked to provide arts education to thousands of children in under-resourced communities through Harmony Project by enabling them to receive instruments and participate in musical mentoring and tuition-free music lessons. Martin collaborates in neuroscience research into how music training affects the brains of students receiving the training.

She serves as a member of the board of directors of the Los Angeles City College Foundation, a member of the advisors and board of directors of D’Addario Foundation, and a member of the advisory board of Knowles Hearing Center.

== Education ==
She completed a Masters of Public health (MPH) degree in 1993 and a Doctor of Public Health (DrPH) degree in 1998 from UCLA Fielding School of Public Health. She is also an alumna of Los Angeles City College (1987–89).

== Personal life ==
Martin is a mother to three children.
