= Youth Orchestra Los Angeles =

Youth orchestra in Los Angeles

- Youth orchestra
- Founded: 2007
- Location: Los Angeles
- Website: http://www.laphil.com/yola

Youth Orchestra Los Angeles (YOLA) is the Los Angeles Philharmonic's initiative to establish youth orchestra programs in underprivileged communities throughout Los Angeles. Modeled on Venezuela's El Sistema, a program which brings classical music education to children from low-income communities, YOLA provides free instruments, music training, and academic support to nearly 1,700 students age 6-18. A "social project first and artistic project second", 100% of YOLA's 2016 graduating class completed high school, and 90% went on to college. YOLA currently operates in four community hubs across Los Angeles including YOLA at HOLA, YOLA at Torres, YOLA at Camino Nuevo, and YOLA at Inglewood.

== History ==
Inspired by the Los Angeles Philharmonic's music and artistic director Gustavo Dudamel's experience with Venezuela's El Sistema youth orchestra movement, the LA Phil founded YOLA in 2007. The program was first established at EXPO Center in the mainly Latino and African American community of South Central Los Angeles. Created in partnership with the Los Angeles Department of Recreation and Parks and the Harmony Project, it included 80 students. Dudamel began working with YOLA at EXPO in 2008, and in 2009 he inaugurated his tenure at the LA Phil wearing a "Youth Orchestra Los Angeles" t-shirt. The first official downbeat of Dudamel's Los Angeles career was a performance of "Ode to Joy" with YOLA at the Hollywood Bowl.

Juan Felipe Molano became the conductor of YOLA in 2014 after an international search and audition by the LA Phil. The music and artistic director of the Yucatan Symphony Orchestra for five years, he had previously conducted the Colombian Youth Philharmonic and was the national director of orchestras for Batuta Colombian System of Youth Orchestras (El Sistema – Colombia). From 2009 until 2014, YOLA was conducted by Bruce Anthony Kiesling.

== YOLA at 10 ==
As of its tenth anniversary in 2017, nearly 800 students participated in YOLA annually. In addition to YOLA at EXPO Center, it includes YOLA at HOLA in LA's Rampart District, a partnership between the LA Phil and the Heart of Los Angeles (HOLA) and YOLA at LACHSA, a partnership with the LA Phil and the Los Angeles County Office of Education. Annually, YOLA provides more than 600 hours of music instruction and more than 120 residency hours with members of the LA Phil as well as programming which includes leadership camps, college prep, and skills training for the program's most advanced students.

Extraordinary as it has been, the YOLA success story should surprise no one. The orchestra has taken its young players (some of whom had hardly ever been out of South L.A.) to Walt Disney Concert Hall, the Hollywood Bowl, London, Tokyo, the Super Bowl and the National Gallery in Washington, D.C. Give kids opportunities, and guess what? It's not rocket science.

— Los Angeles Times, 2016

YOLA has performed with conductors including Simon Rattle, David Robertson, Marin Alsop, Mirga Gražinytė-Tyla and Thomas Wilkins and worked with Journey, Stevie Wonder, Juanes, Gloria Estefan, Gwen Stefani, and Hilary Hahn. In addition to the Hollywood Bowl, YOLA performances have taken place at Walt Disney Concert Hall, The Barbican in London, Suntory Hall in Tokyo, and Kresge Auditorium at the Massachusetts Institute of Technology.

In 2016, alongside Beyoncé and Bruno Mars, 50 YOLA students played the halftime show at the Super Bowl with Coldplay for an audience of 111.9 million viewers. It performed at the 2016 Ojai Music Festival, curated by Peter Sellars, and presented the world premiere of a commissioned work by composer Tania León with guest artists the International Contemporary Ensemble. That same year, 80 of YOLA's most advanced students toured for the first time, performing in Los Angeles, Visalia, Fresno, and Oakland, where they were conducted by Dudamel.

== The Judith and Thomas L. Beckmen YOLA Center at Inglewood ==
In August 2018 YOLA announced its $14.5 million plan for the construction of its first dedicated facility, the Judith and Thomas L. Beckmen YOLA Center at Inglewood. Groundbreaking took place in the spring of 2019. Inaugurated in 2021, the concert hall is housed in a former Security Pacific Bank branch which was redesigned by Frank Gehry, who also designed the Walt Disney Concert Hall, in collaboration with the Los Angeles-based Chait & Company. The Disney Hall's acoustician, Yasuhisa Toyota, also worked on the YOLA Center. In addition to the nearly 420 m^{2} (4,500 sq ft) main hall for up to 272 spectators, the new center includes a choir room, an ensemble room and a practice studio, with all spaces totaling about 25,000 square feet.

== See also ==
- El Sistema USA
