= Peninsula Youth Orchestra, Newport News, Virginia =

The Peninsula Youth Orchestra of Newport News, Virginia is a community-based youth orchestra that was formed in 1960 with the financial and moral support of the Junior League of Hampton Roads and the Peninsula Symphony Orchestra under the direction of Elizabeth Chapman. It now contains a string orchestra, a wind ensemble, and a full orchestra. Members range from elementary school through community members up to 25 years old.

== Organizational history and goals ==
The Peninsula Youth Orchestra was formed in 1960 to provide an alternative to students who may no longer have an orchestra program at school, or provide another outlet to those who want more orchestral experience. Student musicians practice every Monday evening from September to May, and normally present three concerts each year.

== Leadership ==
The Peninsula Youth Orchestra is conducted by different directors. The sinfonia, string orchestra, is conducted by Rebecca Nixon. The wind ensemble is conducted by Anthony Smith. The symphony orchestra is conducted by Richard Marcus.

== Awards and notable concerts ==
The 2010 concert announcement
