= New Brunswick Youth Orchestra =

Canadian orchestra

New Brunswick Youth Orchestra (NBYO)
- Youth orchestra
- Founded: 1965
- Location: Saint John, New Brunswick, Canada
- Website: www.nbyo-ojnb.com

The New Brunswick Youth Orchestra, NBYO for short, (French: L’orchestre des jeunes du Nouveau-Brunswick, OJNB) is a youth orchestra based in Saint John, New Brunswick, Canada. Founded in 1965, the orchestra has approximately 100 members from across the province. The NBYO tours New Brunswick each year, and occasionally performs in other countries, funded by a Board of Directors as well as private, municipal, and provincial grants.

== History ==
The New Brunswick Youth Orchestra was founded in 1965 under Philip W. Oland, who was the president of the New Brunswick Symphony Orchestra (NBSO) at that time. The NBYO effectively became New Brunswick's main orchestra at the NBSO's discontinuation in 1968. The NBYO first performed Woodstock, New Brunswick in October 1966.

The NBYO went on to give many other performances, including musical presentations at Expo 67 and the National Arts Centre. It also participated in several festivals such as the Dominion Centenary Festival of Music for Senior Orchestras, the Festival of International Youth Orchestras, Canadian Festival of Youth Orchestras and the Summa Cum Laude International Youth Music Festival Competition in Vienna, Austria.

In 2009, the New Brunswick Youth Orchestra adopted a musical education and training program entitled Sistema New Brunswick, inspired by the Venezuelan El Sistema program.

== Conductors ==
- Bruce Holder (assistant conductor; 1966)
- Stanley Saunders (1965–1968)
- Kelsey Jones (1968–1969)
- Clayton Hare (1969–1970)
- Stanley Saunders (1970–1974)
- Kenneth Elloway (1974–1975)
- Rodney McLeod (1975–1982)
- James Mark (1982–1983)
- Rodney McLeod (1983–1987)
- Nurhan Arman (1988–1989)
- Paul Pulford (1989–1990)
- Paul Campbell (1990–1994)
- James Mark (1994–2010)
- Antonio Delgado (2010–present)

The NBYO has been guest conducted by, among others, Victor Feldbrill, Alexander Brott, Jánós Sándor, Oskar Danon, Carolyn Davies, Brian Ellard, Cesar Suarez, Michael Newnham and Jean-Phillippe Tremblay https://nbyo-ojnb.com/news/n204https://nbyo-ojnb.com/news/n260

== Special performances ==
The NBYO has performed in the following places:

- 2003 – Carnegie Hall, New York, New York
- 2004 – St. Croix River, St. Croix, New Brunswick
- 2005 – Auditorium Niccolò Paganini, Parma, Italy
- 2007 – Forbidden City, Beijing
- 2011 – Wiener Musikverein, Vienna
- 2023 – 8th Hussars Event, Princess Anne of Edinburgh, Moncton, Canada
- 2023 – Viennese Masters Orchestra Invitational, Carnegie Hall, New York, New York

== Awards ==
- 2008 – East Coast Music Award, Classical Recording of the Year (Forbidden City Tour)
- 2008 – Orchestras Canada Betty Webster Award for outstanding orchestral achievements
- 2010 – TD Canada Trust Award – Arts Organization of the Year
- 2011 – East Coast Music Association nomination, DVD of the Year (Blues on the Boulevard)
- 2011 – Summa Cum Laude International Youth Music Competition (Vienna, Austria) – 1st place in the Symphony Orchestra category
- 2012 – East Coast Music Association nomination, Classical Recording of the Year (Musikfreunde)

== Discography ==
New Brunswick Youth Orchestra discography
- Studio albums: 4
- Video albums: 1

=== Studio albums ===
Year	Album details
2003	Première: Release date: November 10, 2003; Label: Independent
2005	Virtuoso Italia 2005: Release date: November 28, 2005; Label: Independent
2007	Forbidden City Tour: Release date: October 28, 2007; Label: Independent
2011	Musikfreunde, NBYO Vienna Festival and Competition: Release date: September 1, 2011; Label: Leaf Music
