= Kenneth Elloway =

British musician

Captain Kenneth Albert Elloway (17 January 1916 – 22 September 1980) was a British teacher, trombonist, double-bassist, cornetist, and conductor of many orchestras.

Preceded by Stanley Saunders	Principal Conductor of the New Brunswick Youth Orchestra; 1974–1975	Succeeded by Rodney McLeod
