= Musaik – Grenzenlos musizieren =

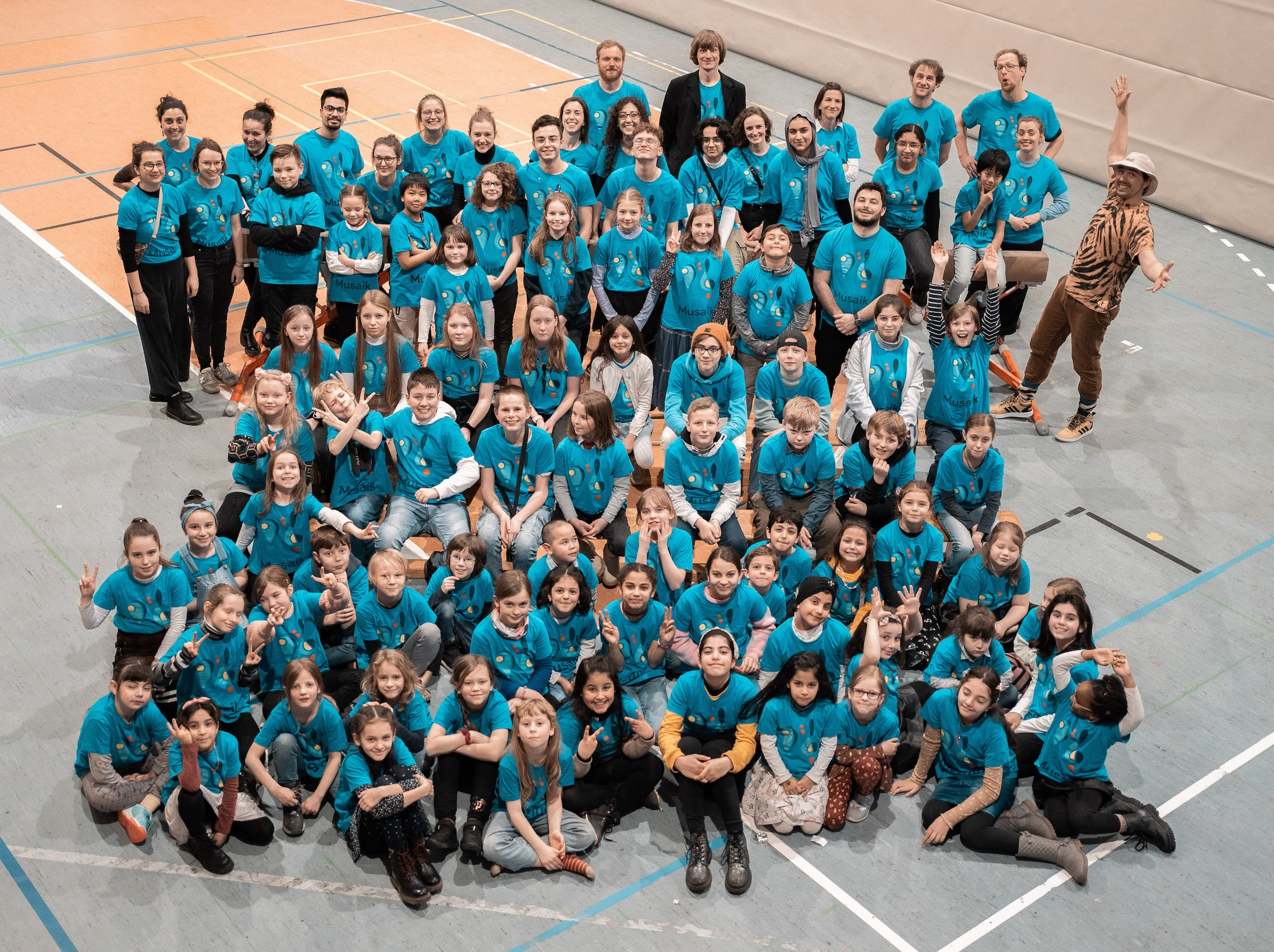
Musaik Orchestra

Musaik – Grenzenlos musizieren (German for Musaik - Making music without boundaries) is a music for social change programme situated in the district of Prohlis, Dresden. Musaik was founded in 2017 with the aim of utilizing music lessons as a tool for social change.

At Musaik, pupils between the ages of six and sixteen receive free group lessons, ensemble and orchestra rehearsals three times a week. The lessons take place in the school where the vast majority of the young people attend. The young people do not need to audition to participate and it is a programme open to all. A free instrument is also made available to each participant. The teachers are trained instrumental pedagogues who are supported by a social pedagogue, office staff and volunteers.

== Method ==
The teaching method of Musaik is inspired by the El Sistema model which originated in Venezuela. This model uses orchestral and ensemble music activities as an agent of social development, inclusion and integration.

The model fosters stimulating learning environments that enable children to swiftly progress towards excellence; ensuring high quality teaching that is intensive and joyful, with peer learning; and regular performances with chamber ensembles and the full orchestra.

The methods Colourstrings, Kodály method and Relative Solmization form the basis of the teaching. From the beginning, music is played exclusively together in the group. Beginners' lessons are divided into wind and string sections. Making music together in the symphonic orchestra is the musical goal of the lessons with a child who starts in August at the beginning of the school year performing with their peers in the full orchestra in December for the first time. Teachers and volunteer instrumentalists support the performances, as do members of the numerous professional bands and orchestras in Dresden such as the Sächsische Staatskapelle Dresden, Dresdner Sinfoniker, Dresden Philharmonic, the Police Orchestra of Saxony, the Banda Communale. Other musical partners of Musaik include the Heinrich Schütz Conservatory Dresden and the Hochschule für Musik Carl Maria von Weber Dresden.

== Social Work ==
The scope of social work within the project has been continuously clarified and expanded since the hiring of a social worker in 2022. Initially, the focus was on lesson support and conflict resolution among participants. Today, regular lessons aimed at fostering social skills are a key component. Through the 'Social Competence Training,' a playful approach is used to strengthen verbal and non-verbal communication skills, constructive conflict resolution, and intercultural exchange. Additionally, a comprehensive child protection concept was developed, the team was trained accordingly, and it was implemented into the daily music education work. This led to the association being officially recognized as an independent youth welfare organization in accordance with § 75 para. 1 SGB VIII.

== Official Partner Orchestra ==
In 2024 the Sächsische Staatskapelle Dresden became the official partner orchestra of Musaik. This was officially launched with a donation of 50,000 euros which the orchestra won for their education work from the Herbert von Karajan Prize 2022. This partnership provides regular masterclasses from the orchestras musicians as well an annual cooperation project where the musicians perform side by side with the Musaik children during a concert. The partnership has also given the children the possibility of visiting the orchestra's Education Programme ‘Kapelle for Kids’.

== History ==
Musaik, a nonprofit charity, was founded in 2017 by the instrumental teachers Luise Börner and Deborah Oehler, graduates of the Hochschule für Musik Carl Maria von Weber Dresden. On return from Peru, where they had volunteered with a similar project called Arpegio, they founded Musaik in an empty ice cream parlour in a shopping centre in Dresden-Prohlis teaching string instruments. The following year, with assistance from the Cellex Stiftung, musaik expanded to include more teachers and wind instruments.

Deborah Oehler won 1st prize in the 2018 University Music Education Competition (Hochschulwettbewerb Musikpädagogik) with Musaik.

In 2019, the composer and pianist Andreas Gundlach developed a contemporary piece together with members of the Musaik Orchestra, which was premiered by the Dresden Symphony Orchestra together with the children on 14 June 2019 at the Festspielhaus Hellerau in Dresden.

As of 2024, around 100 children from 17 countries of origin continuously learn string and wind instruments and show their musical development to the public in several large project presentations per year - complemented by smaller performances in chamber ensembles.

== Prizes and Awards ==
- 2020: Kunstpreis der Landeshauptstadt Dresden, most promising (young) artist award (German: Förderpreis)
- 2020: Dresden-Preis für Frieden und Völkerverständigung an der Semperoper, special prize
- 2021: Charity of the Year (German: Verein des Jahres) of Ostsächsischen Sparkasse Dresden in the culture category (2nd prize)
- 2023: Sächsischer Preis für Kulturelle Bildung »Kultur.LEBT.Demokratie« 2023, Würdigung
- 2023: Ferry Porsche Challenge 'Culture creates participation', 2nd prize
- 2025: Federal Cross of Merit for Luise Börner and Deborah Oehler, the founders of Musaik
