= Naomi Woo =

Canadian conductor and pianist

- Born: Newfoundland, Canada
- Occupations: Conductor, pianist
- Years active: 2010–present
- Known for: First female Music Director of the National Youth Orchestra of Canada
- Website: naomiwoo.com

Naomi Woo is a Canadian conductor and pianist. In December 2023, she was appointed as the first female Music Director of the National Youth Orchestra of Canada (NYOC) for its 2024–2025 season. She is also the Assistant Conductor of the Philadelphia Orchestra and an Artistic Partner of the Orchestre Métropolitain in Montreal.

== Early life and education ==
Woo was born in Newfoundland and raised in North Vancouver. She began playing piano at the age of five. She completed a degree in mathematics and philosophy at Yale University, followed by a Master of Music degree from the Yale School of Music. She earned a PhD from the University of Cambridge as a Gates Cambridge Scholar.

== Career ==
Woo has conducted orchestras across Canada including the Toronto Symphony Orchestra, Vancouver Symphony Orchestra, Calgary Philharmonic Orchestra, and the National Arts Centre Orchestra. She has conducted opera productions for English Touring Opera and Opera Holland Park in the UK.

She conducted the TSO’s 2024 Lunar New Year concert, “Year of the Snake: A Lunar New Year Celebration.” She has advocated for diversity in classical music and participated in initiatives such as the Women in Musical Leadership program by Tapestry Opera and Orchestre Métropolitain’s conducting academy.

Her appointment to the Philadelphia Orchestra was covered by ABC News, highlighting her work breaking barriers in the field.

== Awards and recognition ==
- 2022 – Canada Council’s Virginia Parker Prize
- 2019 – Named one of CBC's "Top 30 Classical Musicians Under 30"
- 2013 – Gates Cambridge Scholarship
- 2016 – Second place, Eckhardt-Gramatté National Music Competition
- Recipient of the Hélène Roberge Prize for Canadian Music

== Personal life ==
Woo is the daughter of Canadian Senator Yuen Pau Woo and Patricia McAvity. She has three siblings, including the late Benjamin Woo. She has spoken publicly about representation and identity in classical music.
