= Roger Lord =

- Genres: Classical
- Occupation: Professor of piano
- Instrument: Piano
- Years active: 1980–present
- Labels: Société Nouvelle d'Enregistrement

Roger Lord is a Canadian performing classical pianist and professor of piano at l'Université de Moncton in Moncton, New Brunswick, Canada. Lord studied at Université de Moncton, McGill University, Université de Montréal, and the Moscow Piano Institute at the Gnessin Music Academy. He has also studied in Paris and Strasbourg.

Lord received First Prize in the Canadian Music Competition and the National Competitive Festival of Music, and was awarded the Éloize Award for Most Successful Acadian Artist Abroad in 1999 by the Association of Professional Acadian Artists. Lord has performed throughout Africa, Asia, Europe, North America and South America as an orchestral soloist and recital performer. He is frequently seen and heard on CBC and its francophone counterpart, Radio-Canada.

In 1999, during the eighth International Francophonie Summit, Lord performed a recital for the State Leaders of 52 nations. He also represented Canada as a pianist at the Olympic Games in 1988. Lord participated in various festivals around the world including at the Shanghai International Arts Festival and at the Festival del centro histórico in Mexico City. In November 2004, he released CD of piano music by 19th century Louisiana composer and virtuoso Louis Moreau Gottschalk. It was produced by the SNE label in Montreal. This CD got nominations for an Éloizes Award as well as for an ECMA Award in Canada. In 2008, in Canada Roger Lord received an "Excellence Award" in Music from the New Brunswick Arts Council.

In 2004, Lord released a studio album of Louis Moreau Gottschalk works entitled Louis Moreau Gottschalk, Selected Works. The album was nominated for an East Coast Music Award in 2005. Lord recorded an album of Chinese songs in 2012.

His brother, Bernard Lord, is the former premier and Progressive Conservative party leader of New Brunswick.
