= Harmony Project =

American nonprofit organization

The Harmony Project is a registered 501(c)(3) nonprofit organization based in Los Angeles, California, that provides free music instruction and instruments to youth in underserved communities in LA and around the country. Programming consists of year-round music lessons, orchestra and ensemble participation, and a peer mentorship program influenced by El Sistema, Venezuela's highly successful music education program. Harmony Project currently serves over 2,000 students in the Los Angeles area, and expanded in 2011 with its first affiliate program, Harmony Project of Ventura County.

== History ==
Harmony Project was founded by Dr. Margaret Martin in April 2001 as a public health intervention to:

- Invest in the positive development of children through the study, practice and performance of music;
- Build healthier communities by investing in the positive development of children through music;
- Develop children as musical ambassadors of peace, hope and understanding amongst people of diverse cultures, backgrounds and beliefs.

It has many different teaching sites all over the Los Angeles area. The first site launched in Hollywood with 36 students and $9000 in funding from the Rotary Club of Hollywood. In 2006, a second site opened in South LA at EXPO center, and the following year Youth Orchestra Los Angeles (YOLA) was formed in partnership with the Los Angeles Philharmonic and to be conducted by famed conductor, Gustavo Dudamel. Harmony Project partnered with LAUSD's Beyond the Bell program in 2009 and in the fall of that year launched the Hip Hop Orchestra, a string ensemble that performs contemporary popular music under the direction of composer and conductor Diane Louie. Harmony Project currently operates at 18 sites across California, and in 6 different states, serving over 6,500 students in all.

Inspired by the positive academic performance of Harmony Project students, in 2011 the program collaborated with Northwestern University's Auditory Neuroscience Lab (aka Kraus Lab; www.brainvolts.northwestern.edu) in prospective randomized controlled research involving elementary-age Harmony Project students to explore the impact of intensive music training (5+ hours per week) on the developing brains, cognition, behavior and academic performance of Harmony students (all from low-income homes) relative to controls. Findings published in multiple scientific journals and widely covered within the popular media include improved precision with which kids' brains capture sound, improved 'hearing in noise' (a proxy for 'focus') and improved literacy, specifically reading at grade level by third grade.

In 2016 Harmony Project students—all from low-income homes—included two Fulbright Scholars, one Gates Millennium Scholar and one doctor (a dentist). Students in Harmony Project's Class of 2016 who participated in the program at least three years experienced an average length of participation of 7 years; 98% will attend college in fall 2016; most are first-generation college students; 50% have been accepted into high value STEM majors.

Harmony Project Affiliates have launched in Ventura CA, New Orleans LA, Tulsa OK, Kansas City MO, East St. Louis IL, Phoenix AZ, San Francisco CA, Hudson NY and Riverside CA. In 2015 Harmony Project's founding program in Los Angeles launched Harmony Project of America as a national initiative tasked with bringing Harmony Project's model of Mentoring Through Music to national scale.

In 2016 the Yamaha Music & Wellness Institute, the non-profit education and research arm of the Yamaha Corporation and Conn-Selmer, an American manufacturer of musical instruments, formally partnered with Harmony Project of America (HPA). HPA also receives support from the D'Addario Foundation, among others.

== Awards and recognition ==
- 2009 – Harmony Project receives the Coming Up Taller Award, which "recognize[s] exemplary arts and humanities programs which foster young people's intellectual and creative development", from the President's Committee on the Arts and the Humanities (PCAH), presented by Michelle Obama at the White House.
- 2010 – Harmony Project founder Dr. Margaret Martin is named Woman of Distinction by the Hollywood Chamber of Commerce.
- 2011 – President Barack Obama awards Dr. Martin the Presidential Citizens Medal, the second-highest civilian honor in the US, for her work with Harmony Project.

In 2015 Harmony Project was designated a 'Bright Spot in Hispanic Education' by a joint White House / U.S. Department of Education initiative.
