= James Mark =

James Mark is a Canadian conductor, clarinetist, saxophonist, arranger and educator. He is Conductor of Musica Viva New Brunswick, Conductor Emeritus of the Prince Edward Island Symphony Orchestra and appears frequently as guest conductor with a number of orchestras and wind ensembles. Additionally, he was Principal Conductor of the New Brunswick Youth Orchestra from 1982–83 and again from 1994–2010, making it "one of the best youth orchestras in Canada". James Mark is Professor Emeritus of Music at Mount Allison University, where he taught clarinet, saxophone, instrumental conducting and secondary music education for more than twenty years. He was also director of the Mount Allison Symphonic Band and mentor to the CMEA award-winning Saxville Quartet. He continues to be in demand as an adjudicator and clinician. He performs regularly on clarinet and saxophone and has appeared across Canada and the United States with numerous regional, national and international broadcasts. Mark holds the Bachelor of Music from the Eastman School of Music (1961), the Master of Music from Hartt College of Music (1969) and the Doctor of Musical Arts from the University of Michigan (1978). He is also an Associate of the Royal College of Music, London, where he was twice awarded (1962, 1963) the Arthur Somervell Prize for Wind Instruments by Queen Elizabeth The Queen Mother. Mark has been a member of the U.S. Air Force Band in Washington, D.C., and taught music at the high school level in Massachusetts.

He and his wife, pianist and harpsichordist Penelope Mark, recorded an album, Canadian Music for Clarinet, which was nominated for an East Coast Music Award. The New Brunswick Youth Orchestra also recorded three albums under his direction, namely Première, Virtuoso Italia 2005 (recorded in Italy), and Forbidden City Tour (recorded in China), which won an East Coast Music Award for Best Classical Recording in 2008. Mark also conducted the NBYO for their performances at Carnegie Hall (NY, NY, US), Auditorio Paganini (Parma, Italy) and for their performance before Queen Elizabeth II.

== Discography ==
=== Albums ===
Canadian Music for Clarinet

- Released: 1999
- Format: CD
- Label: Gossamer Leaves

== See also ==
- New Brunswick Youth Orchestra

Preceded by Rodney McLeod	Principal Conductor of the New Brunswick Youth Orchestra; 1982–1983	Succeeded by Rodney McLeod
Preceded by Paul Campbell	Principal Conductor of the New Brunswick Youth Orchestra; 1994–2010	Succeeded by Antonio Delgado
