= Kelsey Jones =

Canadian musician

Herbert Kelsey Jones (June 17, 1922 – October 10, 2004) was a Canadian composer, pianist, harpsichordist, and music teacher.

== Early life ==
Jones was born in South Norwalk, Norwalk, Connecticut; he grew up in Portland, Maine and moved to New Brunswick in 1945.

== Career ==
In 1950, as a young man, Jones founded the Saint John Symphony Orchestra, now known as Symphony New Brunswick, and served as its conductor until 1953.

Jones moved to Montreal, Quebec in 1954, where he became a member of the faculty of McGill University's Faculty of Music. He composed "Songs of Experience" for the Montreal Bach Choir in 1955. He also performed as a solo pianist and duo pianist with his wife Rosabelle Jones (née Smith) from the early 1950s until an accident that rendered her paraplegic in 1974.

At McGill Jones taught a variety of courses through the years, including History, Harpsichord and Piano, and Theory. he was best known as a teacher of Counterpoint (Modal, Tonal, Fugue & Canon). He became a Canadian citizen in 1956.

In Montreal, he was active as a teacher, performer and composer. He was a founding member of the Baroque Trio of Montreal, along with Mario Duschenes (flute) and Melvin Berman (oboe). He recorded with Jean-Pierre Rampal, Duschenes, and Kenneth Gilbert on their album project, The art of the Flute.

His work "Fantasy on a Theme" was first performed by the Kingston Symphony Orchestra in 1976.

Jones retired from McGill University in 1984 after which he was granted the title Emeritus Professor.

== Compositions ==
Some of Jones's compositions include: "Miramichi Ballad", "Sam Slick", Nonsense Songs (Five Limericks & The Table and the Chair (E. Lear)), "Four Pieces for Recorder Quartet", "Nonsense Songs", Prophecy of Micah, "Passacaglia and Fugue" and Jazzum Opus Unum.
