= Global Leaders Institute =

International graduate school for entrepreneurship

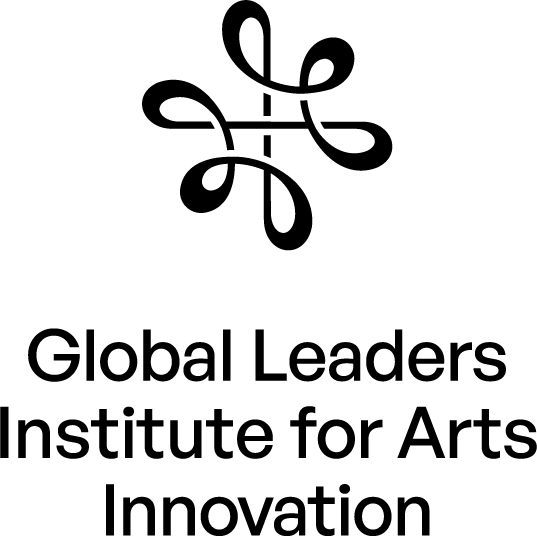
- Motto: Connect Minds. Transform Worlds.
- Type: Private nonprofit
- Established: 2013
- Founders: Nigel A. L. Clarke (Trustee), Mark Gillespie (CEO)
- Affiliations: University of Oxford; Duke University; Georgetown University; Harvard University; Ernst & Young; McGill University; New York University; Stanford University; London School of Economics
- Location: Washington, D.C., United States
- Website: www.globalleadersinstitute.org

The Global Leaders Institute (GLI) is an executive education graduate school for social entrepreneurship in the arts headquartered in Washington DC with seasonal offices in Chile, Colombia, and Italy.

== Academic Curators ==
The Global Leaders Institute offers a 12-month Executive MBA in Arts Innovation focused on social entrepreneurship, cultural management, sustainable impact, and community development. Courses are co-curated by nine institutions of higher learning: Harvard University, Duke University, Georgetown University, McGill University, New York University, University of Oxford, Stanford University, London School of Economics, and the EY Academy of Business.

== International Fieldwork ==
GLI Cohort Members carry out immersive fieldwork in 40+ countries annually on five continents. Fieldwork site hosts include the National Museum of African American History and Culture, the Silkroad Ensemble, Adelaide Symphony Orchestra, Opéra de Montréal, National Autonomous University of Mexico, Thyssen-Bornemisza Museum, Lucerne Festival, Oberlin Conservatory of Music, Carnegie Hall, School of American Ballet, Charleston Symphony Orchestra, Royal Conservatory of Music, Teatro del Lago, Sónar, Universidad Austral de Chile, Gothenburg Symphony Orchestra, New Brunswick Youth Orchestra, Universidad Juárez del Estado de Durango, Ministry of Foreign Affairs (Chile), Verbier Festival, Chicago Public Schools, Fundación Azteca, National Arts Centre, Conservatory of Music of Puerto Rico, Arts Commons, Metropolitan Youth Symphony, La Tertulia Museum, KIPP, Sphinx Organization, National Batuta Foundation, Fundación de Orquestas Juveniles e Infantiles de Chile, Universidad Catolica de Temuco, Society of the Four Arts, Louisiana Philharmonic Orchestra, and the Richmond Symphony, among others.

== History ==
Nigel A. L. Clarke, International Monetary Fund Vice President, is co-founding chair of The Global Leaders Institute. In recent years, the GLI has hosted large-scale Innovation Summits in Frutillar (Chile), Panguipulli (Chile), Tuscany (Italy), Reggio Emilia (Italy), Bielsko-Biała (Poland), Arequipa (Peru), and Palm Beach (United States). The GLI was established in 2013 with seed funding from The Hildegard Behrens Foundation.

== Notable faculty ==
- Marin Alsop
- Rohit Deshpande
- Matthew Bishop
- Arthur C. Brooks
- Carla Dirlikov Canales
- Roberto Dañino
- Hobart Earle
- James Ehnes
- Michael J. Feuer
- Michael Gordon
- Angel Gil-Ordoñez
- Marcus Johnson
- William A. Haseltine
- David Kelley
- David Ludwig
- Albrecht Mayer
- Margaret Martin
- Michael McCarthy
- Anne Midgette
- Adam Ockelford
- Hilda Ochoa-Brillembourg
- Carla Dirlikov Canales
- Adam Ockelford
- Sebastian Ruth
- Ahmad Naser Sarmast
- Gabriela Ortiz
- Frank J. Oteri
- Tom G. Palmer
- Ernesto Palacio
- Panos Panay
- Jasper Parrott
- Rafael Payare
- Paolo Petrocelli
- Gabriel Prokofiev
- André de Quadros
- Nirupama Rao
- Matt Ridley
- Norman E. Rosenthal
- Luis Szarán
- Doris Sommer
- Alexandra Soumm
- Thomas C. Südhof
- Lars H. Thunell
- Hugo Ticciati
- Sergio Vela
- Mike Vranos
- Veronica Wadley, CBE
- William Westney
- Benjamin Zander
- Susan Hallam
- Glenn Schellenberg
- Ángel Gil-Ordóñez
- Gary Ginstling
- Arlene Goldbard
- Richard Hallam
- Carmen Gloria Larenas

== Recent fellows ==
- Claudia Curiel de Icaza
- Michael J. Bobbitt
- Jan Świerkowski
- Nadine Benjamin
- Trigmatic
- Nicole de Weever
- Marlon Daniel
- Toufic Maatouk
- Jennifer Johnston
- Benjamin Bayl
