= The Orchestra of the Americas =

Symphony orchestra representing Western Hemisphere countries

The Orchestra of the Americas (OA) is a symphony orchestra of ages 18 to 30, representing more than 25 countries of the Western Hemisphere.

== Leadership ==
The orchestra is guided by Artistic Advisor Plácido Domingo and Music Director Carlos Miguel Prieto.

== History ==
"Intolerance" Performed by the American Symphony Orchestra at Carnegie Hall

The orchestra was founded in 2002 by VISIÓN Inc in partnership with the New England Conservatory. The Orchestra's creation was inspired by pioneering work of figures including Jorge Peña Hen (Chile), Ana Milena Muñoz Gómez (Colombia), Oscar Arias (Costa Rica), José Antonio Abreu (Venezuela), and others throughout the Americas, to give the platform of the symphony orchestra renewed purpose at the epicenter of social transformations in diverse, underprivileged communities. The organization was established by founding chairman Hilda Ochoa-Brillembourg, vice-chairman Mark Churchill, vice-chairman José Antonio Abreu, and CEO & managing director Debra McKeon, in partnership with The David Rockefeller Center for Latin American Studies at Harvard University, the Organization of American States, and the Inter-American Development Bank. Early musical supporters include Yo-Yo Ma, Carlos Miguel Prieto, Plácido Domingo, Gustavo Dudamel, and Benjamin Zander, among others. Since its inaugural tour, The Orchestra of the Americas has performed over 400 concerts for audiences in 35+ countries throughout the Americas, Europe, and Asia. The Orchestra has reached over 15 million people through television & radio broadcasts, recordings, print, and television - including three feature-length documentary films dedicated to the Orchestra. The Orchestra has released commercial recordings with Plácido Domingo, Gabriela Montero, Philip Glass, and others.

== Members ==
Annually up to 6000 musicians across the Western Hemisphere enter the process of auditioning for one of 80 seats in the Orchestra. All accepted participants join the Orchestra for a period of one year on full scholarship, which includes an annual international residency and tour. Alumni occupy posts in major international orchestras including the London Symphony Orchestra, Mariinsky Theatre Orchestra, Cleveland Orchestra, Toronto Symphony, Pacific Symphony, National Symphony Orchestra, Metropolitan Opera Orchestra, Los Angeles Philharmonic, OSESP, Orquesta Sinfonica Nacional de Mexico, Charlotte Symphony, Louisiana Philharmonic, Portland Symphony, Boston Philharmonic, Buenos Aires Philharmonic, Boston Symphony, Detroit Symphony, Sarasota Orchestra, Seattle Symphony, New World Symphony, Los Angeles Philharmonic, Rotterdam Philharmonic, Paris Opera, Seoul Philharmonic, Chicago Civic Orchestra, Orchestra London, National Arts Centre Orchestra, Minnesota Orchestra, and others. Many alumni have also founded musical institutions in their home regions that focus on social transformation and community development.

== Affiliates ==
=== The Global Leaders Institute ===
The Global Leaders Institute was launched in 2013 as an affiliate of The Orchestra of the Americas Group. Curated by nine higher education institutions, including Harvard University, McGill University, New York University, Stanford University, Georgetown University, Bard College, and Duke University, The Global Leaders Institute offers an annual Executive MBA in Arts Innovation.

=== OAcademy Music Conservatory ===
Academy Music Conservatory (OAcademy) is an online and hybrid conservatory launched in 2020 as an initiative of the Orchestra of the Americas Group. It offers Artist Diploma programs to early-career musicians through four divisions: an orchestra institute, the Carlos Miguel Prieto Conducting Fellowship, a composing studio led by the composer Gabriela Ortiz, and a piano lab led by the pianist Gabriela Montero. Instruction combines live online classes with in-person residencies. Carlos Miguel Prieto, music director of the Orchestra of the Americas, leads the conducting fellowship and serves as OAcademy's music director.

In June 2024, an orchestra composed of OAcademy fellows, students of the University of Michigan School of Music, Theatre & Dance, and students of Mexico's Escuela Superior de Música y Danza de Monterrey spent a week in residence at the University of Michigan, hosted by the University Musical Society. The residency culminated in a public performance at Hill Auditorium on 11 June with the cellist Yo-Yo Ma and the composer Kayhan Kalhor, previewing Kalhor's double concerto for cello and kamancheh, which was to receive its world premiere in Hamburg the following year. In June 2025 the ensemble performed in Monterrey with students of the same school under Prieto, in a concert reviewed by the Monterrey daily El Norte.

OAcademy is an associate member of the European Association of Conservatoires and a member of the European League of Institutes of the Arts.

== Offices ==
The Orchestra of the Americas is registered as an organization in the United States, Costa Rica, Canada, Brazil, and Venezuela.
