= Tyra Banks =

American entertainer (born 1973)

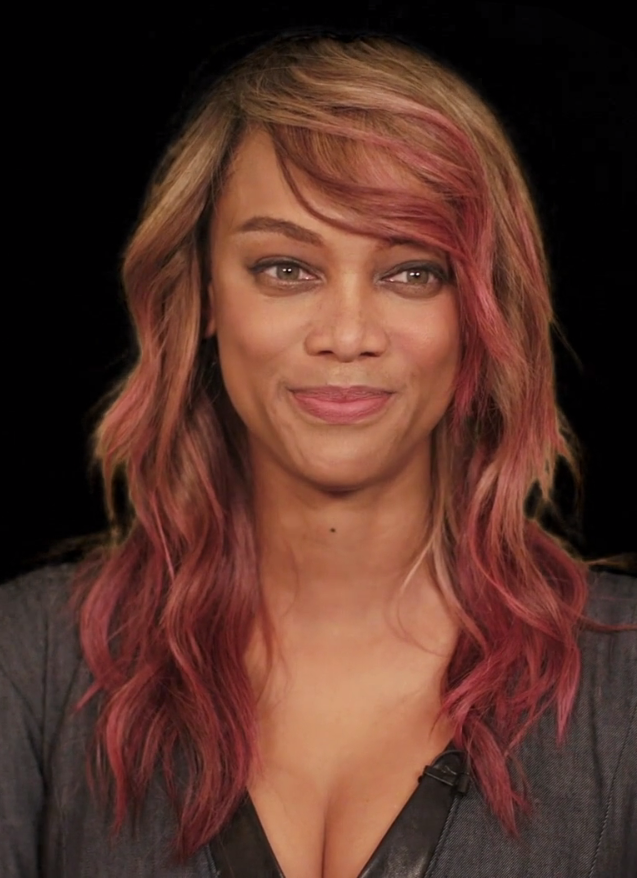
- Banks in 2018
- Born: Tyra Lynne Banks; December 4, 1973 (age 52); Inglewood, California, U.S.
- Other name: BanX
- Education: Immaculate Heart High School
- Occupations: Model; television personality; producer; writer; actress; businesswoman
- Years active: 1991–present
- Television: America's Next Top Model; The Tyra Banks Show; America's Got Talent; FABLife; Dancing with the Stars
- Height: 5 ft 10 in (1.78 m)
- Partner: Erik Asla (2013–2017)
- Children: 1
- Modeling information
- Hair color: Brown
- Eye color: Green

Tyra Lynne Banks (born December 4, 1973) is an American model, television personality, producer, writer, actress, and businesswoman. She began her career as a model at the age of 15 and was the first African American woman to be featured on the covers of GQ and the Sports Illustrated Swimsuit Issue, on which she appeared three times. Banks was one of only a few Black models to achieve supermodel status. She was a Victoria's Secret Angel from 1997 to 2005. By the early 2000s, Banks was one of the world's top-earning models.

Banks began acting on television in the sitcom The Fresh Prince of Bel-Air (1993) and made her film debut in the drama Higher Learning (1995). In 2000, she had major film roles, such as Eve in Disney Channel's Life-Size and Zoe in the box-office hit Coyote Ugly. Banks had small roles in the romantic sports film Love & Basketball (2000), the horror film Halloween: Resurrection (2002), and in the television series Gossip Girl (2009) and Glee (2013).

In 2003, Banks created the reality series America's Next Top Model, which she executive produced and presented for the first twenty-two seasons, until the series' cancellation in October 2015. She remained executive producer for the revival of the series in 2016 and enlisted Rita Ora as host for the twenty-third cycle before reassuming the duties herself for the twenty-fourth cycle. Banks was the co-creator of True Beauty (2009–2010), and had her own talk show, The Tyra Banks Show (2005–2010), which aired on The CW and won two Daytime Emmy awards for Outstanding Talk Show Informative. In 2015, she co-hosted the talk show FABLife for two months. In 2017 and 2018, Banks was the host of America's Got Talent for its 12th and 13th seasons. In 2020, she was the host of Dancing with the Stars for its 29th season, also serving as an executive producer.

In 2010, Banks published a young adult novel, Modelland, based on her life as a model, which topped The New York Times Best Seller list in 2011. She also has her own production company, Bankable Productions, which produced The Tyra Banks Show, America's Next Top Model, and the 2008 film The Clique. Banks is one of four African Americans and seven women to have repeatedly been ranked among the world's most influential people by Time. She is also one of only seventeen models to be ranked as a Legendary Supermodel by Models.com.

== Early life and education ==
Tyra Lynne Banks was born in Inglewood, California on December 4, 1973. Her mother, Carolyn London (now London-Johnson), is a medical photographer, and her father, Donald Banks, is a computer consultant. She has a brother, Devin, who is five years older. In 1979, when Banks was six years old, her parents divorced. She attended John Burroughs Middle School and graduated in 1991 from Immaculate Heart High School in Los Angeles. Banks said that while growing up, she was teased for her appearance and considered an "ugly duckling"; when she was 11 years old, she grew three inches and lost 30 pounds in three months. On America's Next Top Model, Banks discussed the results of an Ancestry.com genealogical DNA test saying that she is "79% African, 14% British, and 6% Native American." In an interview, she added that she is also "1% Finnish", saying: "I'm 14% British, 6% Native American, 1% Finnish, and all the rest African." In February 2012, Banks completed a nine-week course in Harvard University's Owner/President Management non-degree extension program.

== Career ==
=== Modeling ===
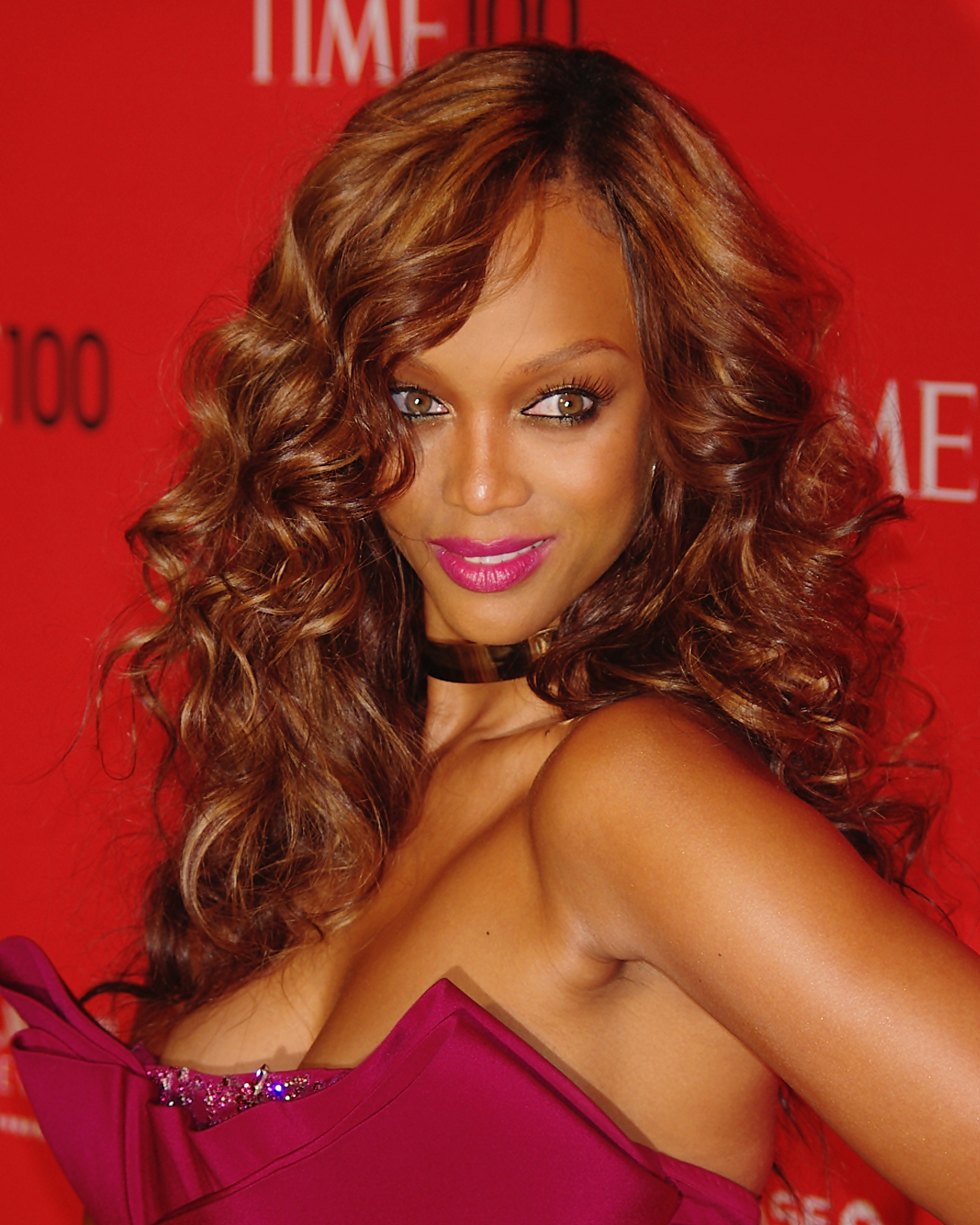
Banks in 2012

When Banks was 15 years old, she started modeling while attending Immaculate Heart High School (Los Angeles). She was rejected by four modeling agencies before she was signed by L.A. Models. She switched to Elite Model Management at age 16. When she got the opportunity to model in Europe, she moved to Milan. In her first runway season, she booked 25 shows in the 1991 Paris Fashion Week. She appeared in editorials for American, Italian, French, and Spanish Vogue; American, French, German, and Spanish Elle; American, German, and Malaysian Harper's Bazaar; V; W, and Vanity Fair.

She appeared on the covers of magazines including Elle, Harper's Bazaar, Spanish Vogue, Cosmopolitan, and Seventeen. She walked in fashion shows for Chanel, Oscar de la Renta, Yves Saint Laurent, Anna Sui, Christian Dior, Donna Karan, Calvin Klein, Perry Ellis, Marc Jacobs, Givenchy, Herve Leger, Valentino, Fendi, Isaac Mizrahi, Giorgio Armani, Sonia Rykiel, Michael Kors, and others. She appeared in advertising campaigns for Yves Saint Laurent, Dolce & Gabbana, Escada, Tommy Hilfiger, Ralph Lauren, Halston, H&M, XOXO, Swatch, Versace, Christian Lacroix, Victoria's Secret, Got Milk?, Pepsi, and Nike. In 1993, Banks signed a contract with CoverGirl cosmetics, launching advertising campaigns for the cosmetics company. She was one of only a few Black models to achieve supermodel status. In the mid-1990s, Banks returned to the U.S. to do commercial modeling.

Banks was the first Black woman on the cover of Sports Illustrated Swimsuit Issue and the first African-American woman on the cover of GQ. In 1997, she received the VH1 award for "Supermodel of the Year". Also in 1997, she was the first African American chosen for the cover of the Victoria's Secret catalog and became a Victoria's Secret Angel. In 2010, she re-signed with her former modeling agency IMG Models. Banks is a contributor of the Vogue Italia website. In 2013, she transformed herself into looking like 15 supermodels, in collaboration with fashion photographer Udo Spreitzenbarth.

In 2019, Banks came out of modeling retirement posing for one of the three 2019 Sports Illustrated Swimsuit Issue covers; the other cover models being Camille Kostek and Alex Morgan. It was her third cover for the publication, 22 years after her first. She announced that she would go by the modeling name BanX, she no longer uses BanX. In 2024, she returned from runway retirement and walked for the Victoria's Secret Fashion Show as the closing model.

=== Film and television ===
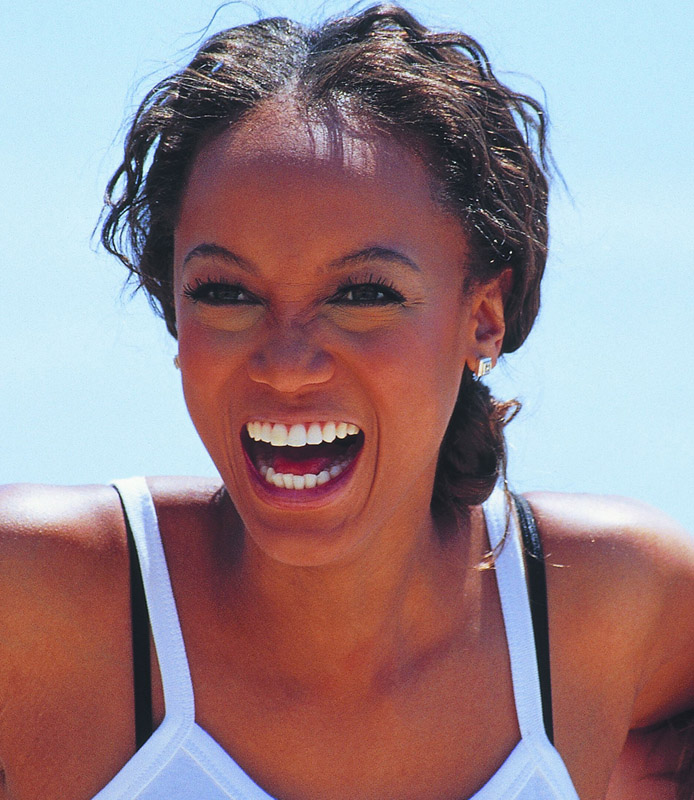
Banks at the 2000 Cannes Film Festival

Banks's television career began on the fourth season of The Fresh Prince of Bel-Air, in which she played lead character Will Smith's old friend Jackie Ames. She made seven appearances in the series. Other TV credits include Felicity, All That, MADtv, Nick Cannon's Wild 'n Out (she was a special guest host and team captain) and The Price Is Right (guest-starring as a "Barker's Beauty"). She appeared as a guest in the animated talk show Space Ghost Coast to Coast in an episode entitled "Chinatown".

Banks began a production company, "Ty Ty Baby Productions"—soon changed to Bankable Productions—which produced The Tyra Banks Show, America's Next Top Model and the 2008 movie The Clique. She is the executive producer and former presenter and judge of America's Next Top Model. In addition, she hosted The Tyra Banks Show, a daytime talk show aimed at younger women, which premiered on September 12, 2005 and ran until May 28, 2010.

In 2008, Banks won the Daytime Emmy Award for her work and production on The Tyra Banks Show, and won for the second time in a row for outstanding, informative talkshow in 2009. Her first big screen role came in 1994, when she co-starred in the drama Higher Learning. She then co-starred with Lindsay Lohan in the Disney film Life-Size, playing a doll named Eve who comes to life. Other films she has appeared in include Love Stinks (1999), Love & Basketball (2000), Coyote Ugly (2000), Halloween: Resurrection (2002), and Hannah Montana: The Movie (2009). Banks appeared in the fourth episode of the third season of Gossip Girl playing Ursula Nyquist, a larger-than-life actress. She appeared on the Disney Channel show Shake It Up as a school librarian.

In 2012, Deadline Hollywood reported that Banks would co-create and produce an ABC comedy series based on her teenage years titled Fivehead. In 2015, she starred in the roundtable lineup talk show FABLife alongside model Chrissy Teigen, fashion stylist Joe Zee, interior designer Lauren Makk, and YouTube personality Leah Ashley. Banks quit the series after less than three months to focus on her cosmetics company. In 2018, she returned to acting for her starring role in Life-Size 2, which premiered on Freeform on December 2. She will star and executive produce Beauty, a documentary series for Quibi. In 2018, she signed a deal with Universal Television. In July 2020, it was announced that Banks would be the new host of Dancing with the Stars. In August 2020, she signed a deal with ABC Signature. In March 2023, she decided to leave the show after three seasons and focus on business commitments.

Banks appeared in the 2025 reboot of the game show Hollywood Squares. In May 2025, it was revealed that Banks will star in a Netflix documentary about ANTM. The documentary "Reality Check: Inside America's Next Top Model" was released in February 2026. In June 2026, Banks filed a lawsuit against Netflix and the documentary producers, claiming that the documentary used selectively edited interview footage to create a false and defamatory portrayal of her.

== Other ventures ==
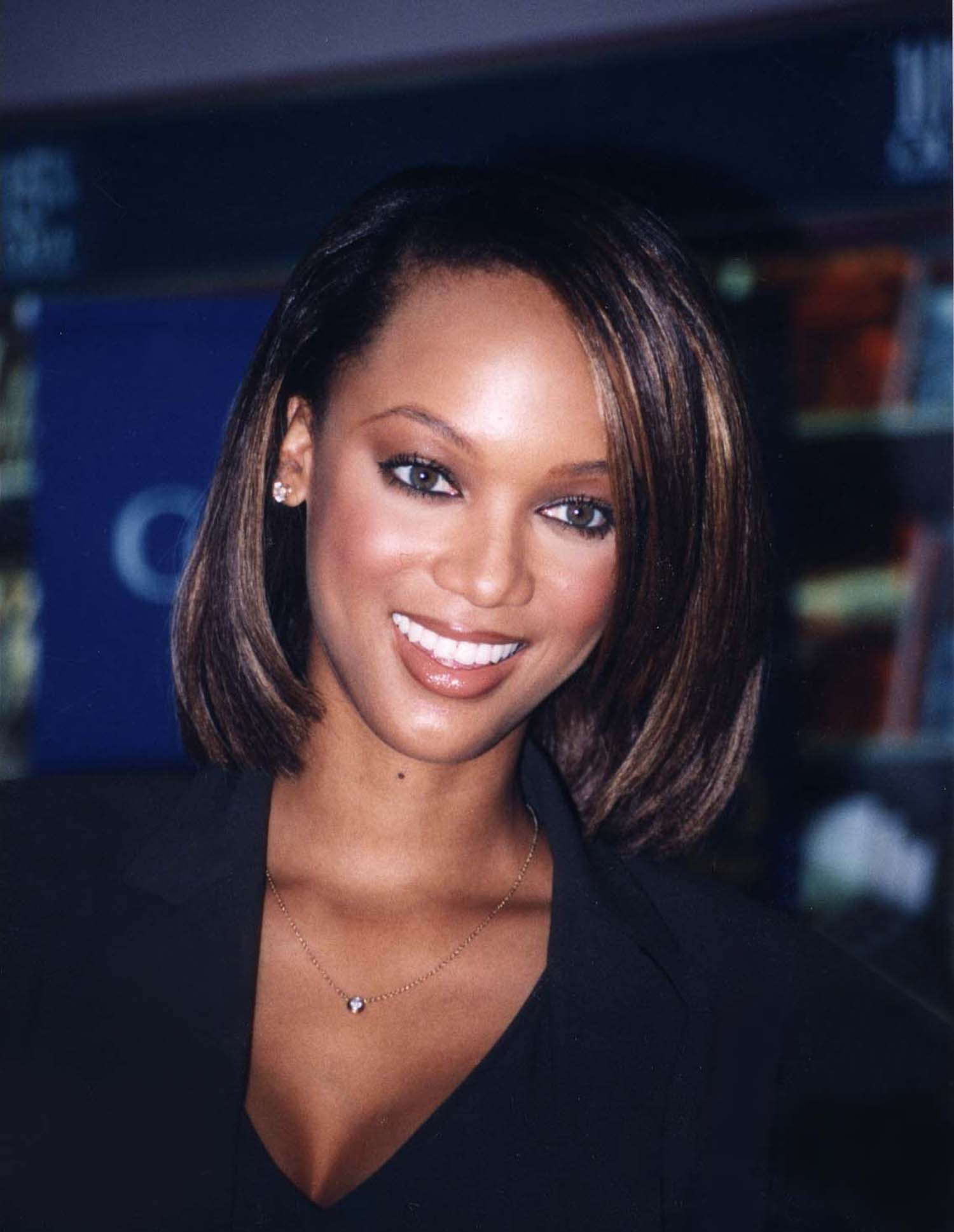
Banks at a book signing in Washington D.C., 1995

=== Cosmetics ===
In 2014, Banks founded the cosmetics brand Tyra Beauty, which she completed a non-degree certificate program at Harvard Business School specifically for. Tyra Beauty uses a multi-level marketing system to recruit sales distributors, who are called "beautytainers" by the company. She held a casting call to find faces for her line, eventually selecting Melody Parra, Monique Hayward, Katy Harvey and Top Model Norge contestant Marita Gomsrud as the cosmetic line's original beauty models. In March 2011, Banks launched her fashion and beauty website called "typeF.com", which she co-created with Demand Media. In 2015, she launched "tyra.com", an interactive cosmetic e-commerce site.

=== Music ===
Banks has appeared in several music videos including Michael Jackson's "Black or White", Mobb Deep's "Trife Life", Tina Turner's "Love Thing", George Michael's "Too Funky" (with models Linda Evangelista, Estelle Lefébure, Emma Sjoberg, and Nadja Auermann), and Lionel Richie's "Don't Wanna Lose You". In 2004, she recorded her first single, "Shake Ya Body", with a music video featuring contestants from cycle 2 of America's Next Top Model. The video premiered on UPN. Banks released a single with NBA player Kobe Bryant, entitled "K.O.B.E.", which was performed on NBA TV. She also had a single on the Life-Size (2000) soundtrack called "Be a Star". She recorded a song with musician Todrick Hall for his 2021 album Femuline, entitled "Fashón".

=== Writing ===
In 1998, Banks co-authored a book entitled Tyra's Beauty, Inside and Out. She announced in May 2010 that she would be writing a novel, Modelland, loosely based on her own modelling experience. It was published in September 2011, intended to be the first of a planned three-part series; Modelland topped The New York Times Best Seller list in October 2011. In 2018, Banks and her mother, Carolyn London, co-authored a book entitled "Perfect is Boring".

=== Teaching ===
In August 2016, Banks was a personal branding guest lecturer at Stanford University.

=== Smize & Dream ===
Banks founded Smize & Dream (SMiZe Cream), a boutique ice cream brand, in 2020. The shop was inspired by Banks' childhood memories of having ice cream with her mother Carolyn on Friday nights. SMiZe first sold package ice cream in California. It has opened pop-up ice cream shops in Los Angeles, Dubai, Washington, D.C., and one permanent location in Sydney.

== Personal life ==
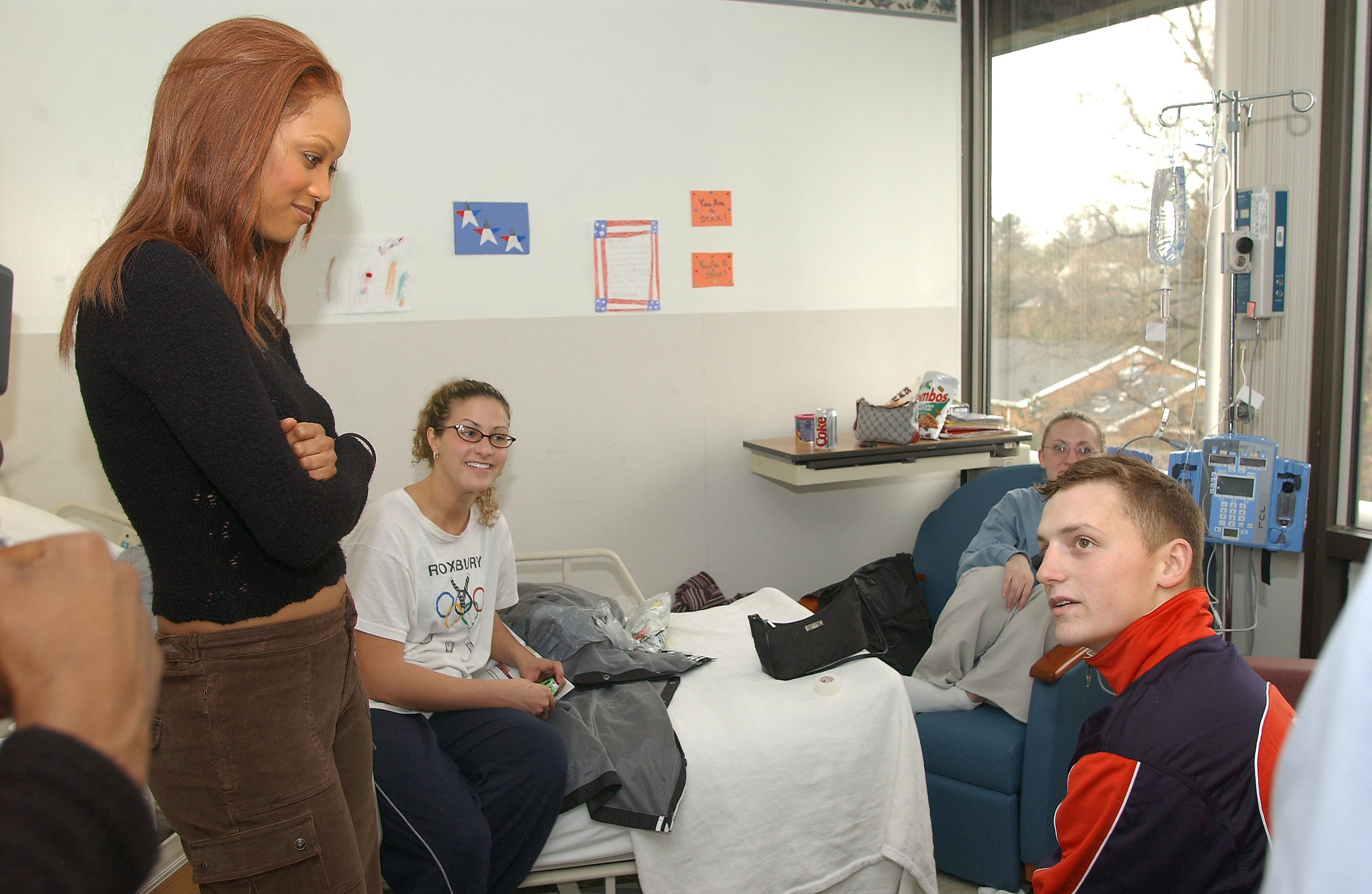
Banks visiting patients at Walter Reed Army Medical Center in Washington, D.C., December 2003

Banks dated Norwegian photographer Erik Asla during the 2010s. She struggled with infertility; her and Asla's attempts to conceive through in vitro fertilisation were unsuccessful. In January 2016, their son York Banks Asla was born via gestational surrogacy. Banks said that she tends to avoid drinking and has never used recreational drugs.

She has spoken out about abusive relationships in her past. In 2005, when asked about her relationship history, she said, "I won't be using a lot of names on the show, but a specific relationship had not just cheating but emotional abuse. It was really bad, but that made me strong." In 2009, she opened up about her past relationships when she made a guest appearance on The Oprah Winfrey Show, hosting alongside Oprah Winfrey. The episode was dedicated to dating violence in response to the assault of Rihanna by Chris Brown.

In 2012, Banks completed Harvard Business School's Owner/President Management Program (OPM), a nine-week executive education course. After she mentioned that she was attending Harvard in an interview, many news publications published articles clarifying the difference between the OPM program and the widely known Harvard MBA program. In 2012, Harvard professor Rohit Deshpande was preparing a case study on Banks's company, Bankable Productions, for use in future coursework in the OPM program.

In January 2025, Banks' home in Los Angeles was destroyed in the Palisades Fire. She and her boyfriend, Louis Bélanger-Martin, were in Australia at the time.

=== Philanthropy ===
In 2000, Banks established the first TZONE program, a weeklong, all-expenses-paid camp for girls ages 13 to 15 seeking guidance about body image and personal empowerment. In 2005, TZONE went from being a camp to a public charity called the TZONE Foundation, which emphasizes leadership and life skills development for young women.

She also established the Tyra Banks Scholarship, a fund aimed at providing African-American girls the opportunity to attend her alma mater, Immaculate Heart High School.

== Filmography ==
=== Film ===
Year	Title	Role	Notes
1994	Extraterrorestrial Alien Encounter	Hostess	Short
1995	Higher Learning	Deja	
1999	Love Stinks	Holly Garnett	
1999	The Apartment Complex	Herself	TV movie
2000	Love & Basketball	Kyra Kessler	
2000	Life-Size	Eve	TV movie
2000	Coyote Ugly	Zoe	
2002	Halloween: Resurrection	Nora Winston	
2002	Eight Crazy Nights	Victoria's Secret Gown (voice)	
2004	Larceny	Herself	
2007	Mr. Woodcock	Herself	
2008	Tropic Thunder	Herself	
2009	Hannah Montana: The Movie	Herself	
2018	Life-Size 2	Eve	TV movie

=== Television ===
Year	Title	Role	Notes
1993	Eurotrash	Herself	Episode: "Episode #1.5"
1993	The Fresh Prince of Bel-Air	Jackie Ames	Recurring Cast: Season 4
1993–94	Soul Train	Herself/Guest Host	Guest Host: Season 23-24
1995	Soul Train Lady of Soul Awards	Herself/Co-Host	Main Co-Host
1996	All That	Customer	Episode: "Tyra Banks/Blackstreet"
1997	Very Important Pennis	Herself	Episode: "Very Important Pennis: Part 3"
1997	New York Undercover	Natasha Claybourne	Recurring Cast: Season 3
1998	Space Ghost Coast to Coast	Herself	Episode: "Chinatown"
1999	Soul Train Music Awards	Herself/Co-Host	Main Co-Host
1999	The Greatest	Herself	Episode: "100 Greatest Women of Rock & Roll"
1999	The Teen Files	Herself	Episode: "The Truth About Drinking"
1999	Just Shoot Me!	Herself	Episode: "Nina Sees Red: Part 1 & 2"
1999	Happily Ever After: Fairy Tales for Every Child	Barbie Q. Pepper (voice)	Episode: "The Three Little Pigs"
1999	The Hughleys	Nicole	Episode: "Sap and the Star"
2000	Academy Awards	Herself/Countdown Host	Main Countdown Host
2000	Who Wants to Be a Millionaire	Herself/Contestant	Episode: "Celebrity Millionaire 2, Show 1 & 3–4"
2000	MADtv	Katisha	Episode: "Episode #5.17" & "#5.25"
2000	Felicity	Jane Scott	Recurring Cast: Season 3
2001	Soul Food	Nina Joseph	Episode: "Ordinary Pain"
2003–18	America's Next Top Model	Herself/Host	Main Host: Seasons 1–22 & 24, Guest: Season 23
2004	Punk'd	Herself	Episode: "Episode #3.8"
2004	Vibe Awards	Herself/Co-Host	Main Co-Host
2004	MADtv	Herself	Episode: "Episode #10.7"
2004	All of Us	Roni	Episode: "O Brother, Where Art Thou?"
2004	American Dreams	Carolyn Gill	Episode: "Chasing the Past"
2005	The Fabulous Life of...	Herself	Episode: "Today's Hottest Supermodels"
2005–08	E! True Hollywood Story	Herself	Recurring Guest
2005–10	The Tyra Banks Show	Herself/Host	Main Host
2006	Germany's Next Topmodel	Herself	Episode: "New York"
2006	The Price Is Right	Herself/Guest Model	Episode: "Episode #34.103"
2006	Kathy Griffin: My Life on the D-List	Herself	Episode: "Going, Going, Gone"
2008	Deal or No Deal	Herself	Episode: "Episode #3.51"
2009	Gossip Girl	Ursula Nyquist	Episode: "Dan de Fleurette"
2010	The Soup	Herself	Episode: "Episode #7.10"
2010	Biography	Herself	Episode: "Tyra Banks"
2011	Mexico's Next Top Model	Herself/Guest Judge	Episode: "Episode 13"
2012	Vietnam's Next Top Model	Herself/Guest Judge	Episode: "Episode 14 - Live Finale"
2012–13	Shake It Up	Mrs. Burke	Guest Cast: Season 2-3
2013	Asia's Next Top Model	Herself/Guest Judge	Episode: "Finale"
2013	Top Model Norge	Herself/Guest Judge	Episode: "Season Finale"
2013	Glee	Bichette	Episode: "Movin' Out"
2013	China's Next Top Model	Herself/Guest Judge	Episode: "Episode 6" & "Episode 12"
2015	Daytime Emmy Awards	Herself/Host	Main Host
2015	Australia's Next Top Model	Herself/Guest Judge	Episode: "Finale"
2015	VIP for a Day	Herself	Episode: "FABLife"
2015–16	FABLife	Herself/Host	Main Host
2016	Black-ish	Gigi Franklin	Episode: "Plus Two Isn't a Thing" & "Just Christmas, Baby"
2017	The New Celebrity Apprentice	Herself/Boardroom Advisor	Recurring Advisor: Season 15
2017	So Cosmo	Herself	Episode: "Vol. 1, No. 4: Fun Fearless Money"
2017–18	America's Got Talent	Herself/Host	Main Host: Seasons 12–13
2018	Women That Soar Awards	Herself/Host	Main Host
2018	Carpool Karaoke	Herself	Episode: "Tyra Banks & Lil' Yachty"
2019	Uncensored	Herself	Episode: "Tyra Banks"
2020	The View	Herself/Guest Co-Host	Episode: "Tyra Banks/Gavin Newsom/View Your Deal"
2020	Celebrity Watch Party	Herself	Recurring Cast
2020–22	Dancing with the Stars	Herself/Host	Main Host: Seasons 29–31
2021	Punk'd	Herself	Episode: "Model Misbehavior With Tyra Banks"
2021	Entertainment Tonight	Herself/Guest Co-Host	Episode: "Episode #40.250"
2021	Insecure	Inglewood Mayor	Episode: "Choices, Okay?!"
2022	I Love That for You	Herself	Episode: "#JoannaStrong"
2025	Hollywood Squares	Herself/Panelist	Recurring Panelist
2025	Bel-Air	Regina Baxter	Episode: "Your Crown Is Waiting"
2025	Project Runway	Herself/Guest Judge	Episode: "Something Wicked"
2026	Reality Check: Inside America's Next Top Model	Herself	Main Guest
2026	Project Runway	Herself/ Recurring Judge	Recurring Judge: Season 22

=== Music videos ===
Year	Music video	Artist
1990	"So You Like What You See"	Samuelle
1991	"Black or White"	Michael Jackson
1991	"Love Thing"	Tina Turner
1992	"Too Funky"	George Michael
1995	"Trife Life"	Mobb Deep
1996	"Don't Wanna Lose You"	Lionel Richie
2004	"Shake Ya Body"	Herself
2015	"BOOTYful"	Herself
2016	"Childs Play"	Drake

== Discography ==
Singles

- 2000: "Be A Star"
- 2004: "Shake Ya Body"
- 2011: "Modelland"
- 2018: "Be A Star 2" (featuring New Fear's Eve)
- 2025: "Santa SMiZE, Santa SMiZE" (Tyra Banks as Santa SMiZE, featuring Tyra Banks)

Guest appearances

- 1999: "K.O.B.E." (Kobe Bryant featuring Tyra Banks)
- 2021: "FASHÓN" (Todrick Hall featuring Tyra Banks)
- 2021: "I Want That Smize Cream" (DJ Splitz featuring Tyra Banks and STORi)

== Bibliography ==
- Vanessa Thomas, Bush; Banks, Tyra (1998). Tyra's Beauty Inside & Out. Harper Perennial. ISBN 978-0-06-095210-5.
- Banks, Tyra (2011). Modelland. Delacorte Books. ISBN 978-0-385-74059-3.
- Banks, Tyra; London, Carolyn (2018). Perfect Is Boring. Tarcher Perigee. ISBN 978-0-14-313230-1.

== Awards and nominations ==
Year	Awards	Category	Recipient	Outcome	Ref.
1999	Teen Choice Awards	Choice Model	Herself	Won	
2004	Teen Choice Awards	Choice Reality/Variety TV Star - Female	America's Next Top Model	Nominated	
2005	Teen Choice Awards	Choice TV Personality: Female	America's Next Top Model	Nominated	
2005	Online Film & Television Association Award	Best Host of a Talk or Service Show	The Tyra Banks Show	Nominated	
2007	Teen Choice Awards	Choice TV: Personality	America's Next Top Model/The Tyra Banks Show	Won	
2007	Daytime Emmy Award	Outstanding Talk Show	The Tyra Banks Show	Nominated	
2007	ASTRA Awards	Favourite International Personality or Actor	America's Next Top Model	Nominated	
2008	Teen Choice Awards	Choice TV: Personality	America's Next Top Model	Won	
2008	Daytime Emmy Award	Outstanding Talk Show/Informative	The Tyra Banks Show	Won	
2009	Daytime Emmy Award	Outstanding Talk Show/Informative	The Tyra Banks Show	Won	
2017	Teen Choice Awards	Choice TV: Personality	America's Got Talent	Nominated	
2019	Kids' Choice Awards	Favorite TV Host	America's Got Talent	Nominated	
