= The Canales Project =

American non-profit organization

The Canales Project (TCP) is an American 501(c)(3) not-for-profit organization, created to "activate the arts as a tool for social change and impact" and aims to give “voice to issues of identity and culture through music and conversation.”

TCP was founded in 2016 by the internationally acclaimed mezzo-soprano Carla Dirlikov Canales, and uses the arts to help find new solutions to challenges facing society.

Canales has said that the aim of her project is to recruit an "army of compassion", a collection of artists, each with their own personal story about living "between two worlds" and of dealing with the tensions of different cultural environments.

Many of the organization's programming initiatives are enacted through collaborating with partner organizations, including Carnegie Hall, TEDxMidAtlantic, and YoungArts. In addition, TCP has spearheaded several arts educational initiatives including "Finding Your Voice" with Boys and Girls Clubs of Tucson and "V-Pals".
