= Jan Świerkowski =

Polish astronomer

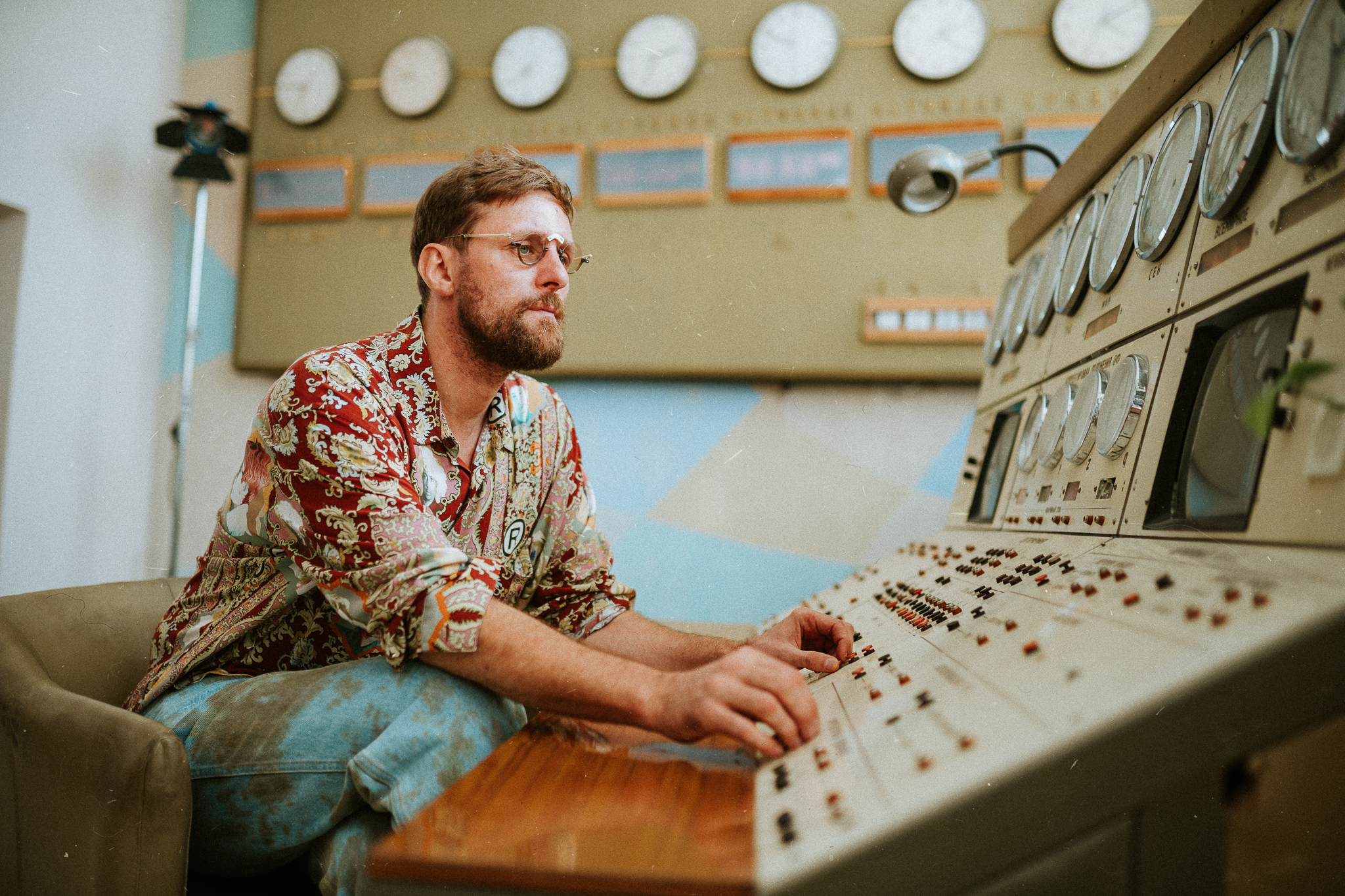
Jan Świerkowski at Byurakan Observatory.

Jan Świerkowski (born 1984) is a Polish artist, curator, cultural researcher and astronomer. He is the founder and curator of the international art and science collective Instytut B61.

== Biography and Education ==
In 2010, Jan Świerkowski graduated with a degree in astronomy from Nicolaus Copernicus University in Toruń (Poland), where he now serves as an honorary ambassador. Prior to his graduation, he founded Instytut B61 a collective of artists and scientists. Established in 2009 as part of the UNESCO International Astronomy Year, the group explores the invisible realms of particle physics and astronomy, creating large-scale immersive experiences, exhibitions and performances. Świerkowski curates the group’s activities, utilizing his experimental cognitive methodology that fosters collaboration between artists and scientists, which eventually led him to obtain a U.S. patent in 2022 for a System for a Multimodal Educational Display in a Pop-up Science Center. Since 2016 he has been a member of the Research Center for Communication and Culture in Lisbon and a scholarship holder of the Portuguese Fundação para a Ciência e a Tecnologia (2016 - 2022). In 2018, Świerkowski was awarded the title of the Popularizer of Science 2017 in the Activity Leader category by the Polish Press Agency and the Polish Ministry of Science and Higher Education. In 2023, Świerkowski received a PhD in cultural studies through a joint program at Universidade Católica Portuguesa and the University of Copenhagen, furthering his interdisciplinary research at the intersection of art, science, and culture. In 2024 he became a member of the MBA in Art Innovation program held by the Global Leaders Institute.

== Art and Science practice ==
From 2009 to 2011, following its founding, Instytut B61 curated by Świerkowski became renowned for its unique site-specific performances that blended art and science, with topics ranging from astrophysics to quantum mechanics. Each performance took place in secret locations, creating a sense of mystery and exclusivity for the audience. These locations, often non-traditional venues such as abandoned factories, train stations, or warehouses, were transformed into immersive, multi-dimensional spaces.

Every performance was an elaborate collaboration between artists and scientists, consisting of dozens of interconnected spaces, each exploring a different scientific concept through artistic interpretation. The audience was guided through these spaces, encountering a variety of installations, theatrical pieces, and interactive experiences. The performances were designed not only to entertain but also to educate, offering viewers an engaging way to understand complex scientific phenomena. During this period, the group collaborated with influential Polish artists, including jazz trumpeter Tomasz Stańko, violinist Michał Urbaniak, and comedian Stanisław Tym, further elevating the artistic and cultural impact of the performances. This interdisciplinary approach allowed Instytut B61 to bridge the gap between science and art in a way that was both intellectually stimulating and visually captivating.

In 2010, Świerkowski led Instytut B61's Zderzenie ("Collision"), an innovative art and science project inspired by the Large Hadron Collider (LHC). Świerkowski curated the concept and oversaw the transformation of a cargo train into a traveling, immersive experience, with each train cart symbolizing a different LHC detector. He collaborated with artists and scientists to create interactive installations within the train cars, offering audiences in six Polish cities a unique opportunity to engage with complex particle physics concepts in an accessible and artistic format.

After the success of the first art train project, Jan Świerkowski became the head of Cosmic Underground in 2012, a trans-European artistic project co-financed by the European Commission. The project was an ambitious two-month journey across Europe, where nearly 40 artists from Poland, Latvia, Estonia, and Portugal traveled on a specially adapted freight train consisting of 10 train cars repurposed for art installations. The train stopped at various railway stations in cities and smaller towns across Europe, including Tallinn, Riga, Vilnius, Warsaw, and Lisbon, allowing the public to experience large-scale, site-specific performances.

Inspired by Albert Einstein's Theory of Relativity, Cosmic Underground revolved around the fictional scientist Joseph Brewster, who explored the nature of time. This blend of art and science not only reflected on the scientific themes of time dilation but also served as a metaphor for the search for democratic identity in post-communist and post-fascist countries. By connecting European Capitals of Culture with more remote and lesser-known locations, the project aimed to foster a cultural dialogue about the shared and diverse identities within the European Union. Świerkowski, as the project coordinator and co-curator, played a key role in conceptualizing and leading this interdisciplinary collaboration, which combined visual art, music, literature, and scientific research into a unique and immersive experience. The project received significant attention for its innovative approach, gathering an audience of approximately 20,000 people.

In 2013, Świerkowski received a scholarship from the Polish Minister of Culture and National Heritage. In the same year, together with the rapper L.U.C, he created the music video "Higgs boson" promoting the exhibition "The Universe and Particles" at the Copernicus Science Center in Warsaw and directed the Złota Zasada performance in Toruń . In 2014, he organized and was the curator of the first ever Polish Culture Festival in Portugal. In 2015, Instytut B61's spectacular performance The Evolution of the Stars was shown during the 40th Reminescencje festival in Kraków and one year later during the celebrations of Wrocław Europejska Stolica Kultury 2016. In 2017, the same performance became one of the key elements of The Story of Space Festival in Panjim in India.

In 2019, Świerkowski directed the Interstellar Sugar Center performance in Ponta Delgada, Azores during TREMOR festival of which Forbes wrote:

"The experience is euphoric and mind-bending, with a touch of Clockwork Orange. The finale is a deeply poignant song from a dying star, who sounds like a heartbroken Polish Johnny Cash. If this evening had a director, it would, of course, be Stanley Kubrick"

Set within the unusual location of a sugar factory, the piece was a collaboration between Instytut B61 and Azorean artists. The performance took the audience on a surreal journey, blending scientific concepts with artistic expression through various immersive elements. The experience, which involved unconventional staging, such as transporting the audience in a blacked-out coach, combined the bizarre with the emotional, creating a unique and memorable event. The performance took place shortly after the release of the first-ever image of a black hole, adding a timely scientific relevance to the project. In 2022, Świerkowski co-curated (with Olga Marcinkiewicz) the exhibition Understanding Universe in the Polish Pavilion during EXPO 2020. In August 2022, Świerkowski wrote a chapter Instytut B61: Translating the Invisible into Immersive Artsci Theatre for the book Science & Theatre: Communicating Science and Technology with Performing Arts published by Emerald. Later that year he directed The Evolution of Stars performance in the Yerevan Opera Theater during the Starmus Festival directed by Garik Israelian and Brian May. Armenian news agency News.am summed up the performance:

"The end of the show in a massive surrealistic lift also had a lasting effect, a kick of adrenalin flavored with the atmosphere of «Solaris». Puzzled and engaged with every atom of our bodies we were like a team of cosmic voyagers who have just discovered the truth behind reality. Isn't this what science does? It raises the curtain allowing us to see what is happening in the core of our existence."

In November 2022, during Falling Walls Berlin Science Week, Jan Świerkowski presented the Casino Copernicus installation, a series of arcade games inspired by the work and discoveries of Nicolaus Copernicus, developed in collaboration with pixel artists Tomasz Wlaźlak. The installation was first showcased at the Museum für Naturkunde in Berlin and later traveled to other prestigious locations, including the Leiden Observatory in the Netherlands, ESO Supernova in Munich, Sónar festival in Barcelona and Madrid Planetarium. In September 2024, the exhibition under the name Copernican Principle opened in Science Centre Singapore and was named one of the top exhibitions in Singapore by Time Out Magazine.

During Berlin Science Week, Świerkowski presented his keynote lecture, Art and Science of the Invisible World, for the first time. He later delivered this lecture at the Kochi-Muziris Biennale in Kochi, India, the Museums + Heritage Show in London, UK, Sónar in Barcelona, Spain, Madrid Planetarium, Madrid, Tumo Center for Creative Technologies in Yerevan Armenia, Science Centre Singapore in Singapore, Post-Digital Intersections in Timisoara, Romania, and Pretoria Boys High School in Pretoria, South Africa.

In April 2023, Świerkowski co-directed (with Aleksandra Bednarz) Experiments with Imagination, a collateral project during the closing week of Kochi-Muziris Biennale in Kochi, Kerala. The exhibition presented a series of six performances held at the Mattancherry Mohamed Ali Warehouse, which blended art, science, and technology to depict the life and death of a star. The interactive exhibition presented in collaboration with Indian artists combined music, visuals, and live performances to create an immersive experience that aimed to evoke emotional responses and transport the audience into the cosmos.

In November 2023, Świerkowski co-directed (with Aleksandra Bednarz) Welcome to Earth performance during the closing week of the European Capital of Youth in Lublin, Poland. The performance was part of the Direction Earth/Space project, developed by Science Now in collaboration with the European Space Agency. The performance offered a unique perspective on Earth as seen from space, exploring the planet's place in the universe. Through a multimedia spectacle, the audience experienced the forces of temperature and gravity, participated in interactive elements like climate karaoke, and moved in sync with the rhythms of nature. The performance was a powerful blend of science and art, inviting participants to reflect on the birth of life, the boundless ocean, and their role in shaping a better future.

In February 2024, Świerkowski founded and curated the first edition of Nowe Obroty Festival, in Toruń, Poland, which focused on the theme of New Copernican revolutions, exploring how groundbreaking scientific discoveries continue to reshape our understanding of the universe. The festival featured a diverse lineup of prominent figures, including Nobel Peace Prize laureate Leymah Gbowee, astrobiologist Mary Voytek, astrophysicist Avi Loeb, as well as renowned Polish pianist Leszek Możdżer. Through a mix of performances, discussions, and interdisciplinary collaborations, Nowe Obroty sought to engage the public in dialogue about humanity's place in the cosmos and the evolving role of science in shaping our future.
