= Klauspeter Seibel =

German conductor and music educator

- Born: 7 May 1936; Offenbach am Main
- Died: 8 January 2011 (aged 74); Hamburg
- Education: Hochschule für Musik Nürnberg, University of Music and Theatre Munich
- Occupations: Conductor, professor

Klauspeter Seibel (7 May 1936 in Offenbach am Main – 8 January 2011 in Hamburg) was a German conductor. Trained at the Nuremberg Conservatory and the Hochschule für Musik und Theater München, he was principal conductor of the Nuremberg Symphony Orchestra (1980–1988), the Kiel Philharmonic Orchestra (1987–1995), and the Louisiana Philharmonic Orchestra (1995–2005). He was notably the LPO's first music director, and after being succeeded by Carlos Miguel Prieto as principal conductor in 2005 he remained principal guest conductor of the LPO until his death. He last conducted the LPO in October 2010 when he led the orchestra in the world premiere of Stephen Dankner's Symphony No. 9. In addition to conducting, Seibel was a professor of conducting at the Hamburger Konservatorium for two decades, and also taught at the Juilliard School, the Chautauqua Institution and at the Jacobs School of Music at Indiana University.
