= Carlos Miguel Prieto =

Mexican conductor (born 1965)

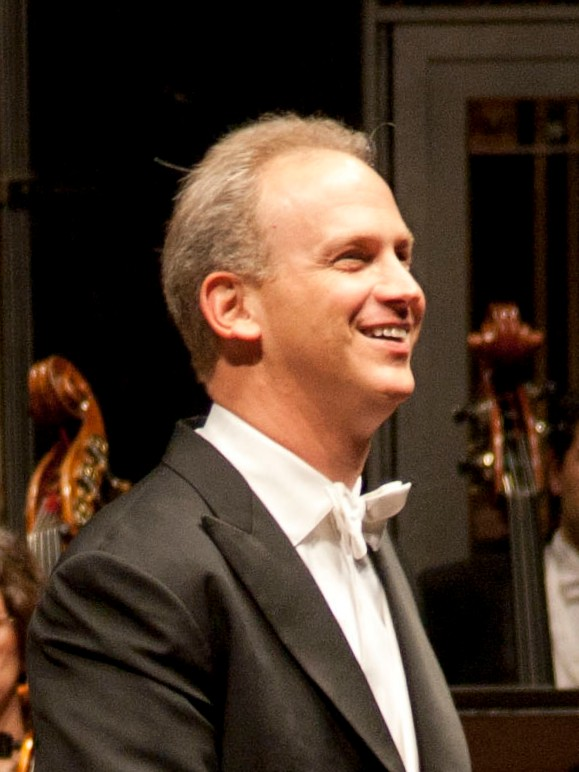
Carlos Miguel Prieto in 2014.

Carlos Miguel Prieto (born 14 November 1965) is a Mexican conductor. He is music director of the North Carolina Symphony, the Orquesta Sinfonica de Mineria, and The Orchestra of the Americas in Washington, D.C..

== Early life and education ==
Prieto grew up in a musical family, with a cellist father, Carlos Prieto. His family formed the Cuarteto Prieto, with which he played violin. His grandfather was on the board of Mexico's National Symphony Orchestra. At an early age, he began playing violin, and continued playing music throughout his youth, including during his subsequent university studies. Prieto earned a degree in electrical engineering from Princeton. In 1992, he earned a Master's of Business Administration at Harvard University. He worked for a sugar company before devoting full-time to music as a career.

Prieto attended conducting courses at the Pierre Monteux School in Maine, and at the Tanglewood Music Center. He has studied conducting with Jorge Mester, Enrique Diemecke, Charles Bruck and Michael Jinbo.

== Career ==
Prieto made his made his professional debut with the Mexico City Philharmonic Orchestra in 1995, and served as its music director from 1998 to 2002. In 2002, Prieto became music director of the Orquesta Sinfónica de Xalapa, a position he held until 2008. Prieto was named music director of the Orquesta Sinfónica Nacional de Mexico in 2007. He was appointed music director of the Orquesta Sinfónica de Minería in 2008, with which he founded the Mozart-Haydn Festival.

In the US, Prieto was assistant conductor of the Houston Symphony Orchestra from 2003 to 2006, and music director of the Huntsville Symphony Orchestra from 2003 to 2011. In 2005, he conducted the Naumburg Orchestral Concerts, in the Naumburg Bandshell, Central Park, in the summer series. In that year Prieto also became music director of the Louisiana Philharmonic Orchestra, one week before Hurricane Katrina hit New Orleans. The orchestra extended his contract as the orchestra's music director twice, in 2009 and in 2013, with his current contract set through the 2018-2019 season. Prieto led the orchestra in its Carnegie Hall debut on February 27, 2018. Prieto stood down as the orchestra's music director in 2023, and now has the title of conductor laureate of the Louisiana Philharmonic Orchestra.

Prieto has been associated with The Orchestra of the Americas from its inception in 2002. He was named principal conductor that year, and served in that role until 2011, when he was appointed music director. Prieto has conducted over 100 world premieres of works by Mexican and American composers, many of which he commissioned.

In June 2021, the North Carolina Symphony announced the appointment of Prieto as its artistic advisor for the 2021-2022 season. In February 2022, the North Carolina Symphony announced the appointment of Prieto as its next music director, effective with the 2023-2024 season, with an initial contract of four years. Prieto served as the orchestra's music director-designate for the 2022-2023 season.

Prieto has recorded for the Urtext Records, Sony Classical, Naxos, and Avanticlassic labels. For Urtext, he has made a series of recordings of Latin American and Mexican music. In 2013, a 12-DVD set of Mahler's symphonies was released, with the Orquestra Sinfonica de Mineria conducted by Prieto. In 2016, Gabriela Montero, Prieto and the YOA Orchestra of the Americas won the Best Classical Album award at the Latin Grammy Awards for a recording of music by Rachmaninov and Gabriela Montero.

Prieto's honours include the Order of Orange-Nassau (Grade of Officer), from the government of the Netherlands, 'Conductor of the Year 2002' from the Mexican Union of Music and Theatre Critics, and the Mozart Medal of Honor presented by the Government of Mexico and the Embassy of Austria in 1998. In 2007, Prieto served as Mexico's delegate to the Davos World Economic Forum. In October 2018, Musical America named Prieto its 2019 Conductor of the Year.

Prieto and his wife Isabel Mariscal, a former ballerina with the Mexican National Ballet, have three children.

Cultural offices
Preceded by José Guadalupe Flores	Music Director, Orquesta Sinfónica de Xalapa; 2002–2008	Succeeded by Fernando Lozano Rodríguez
Preceded by Taavo Virkhaus	Music Director, Huntsville Symphony Orchestra; 2003–2011	Succeeded by Gregory Vajda
Preceded by Klauspeter Seibel	Music Director, Louisiana Philharmonic Orchestra; 2005–2023	Succeeded by Matthew Kraemer
Preceded by Enrique Diemecke	Music Director, Orquesta Sinfónica Nacional de Mexico; 2007–present	Succeeded by incumbent
Preceded by Grant Llewellyn	Music Director, North Carolina Symphony; 2023–present	Succeeded by incumbent
