= Richard Hallam =

English musician and music educator

Richard John Hallam MBE
- Born: 1948 (age 77–78)
- Occupations: Musician, music educator

Academic background
- Education: Open University; Royal Academy of Music
- Website: http://www.dickhallam.co.uk/

Richard John Hallam MBE (born 1948) is an English musician and music educator. He is best known for his work as the Director of Music in Oxfordshire from 1987 to 2008 and for advising successive UK governments on music education policy from 2003 to 2012. This included serving as the National Music Participation Director for the Department for Education from 2008 to 2011. He is also well known for his work in relation to El Sistema internationally.

Hallam has been chair of the National Association for Music Education, President of the Incorporated Society of Musicians, and Chair of the UK Music Education Council.

Hallam was awarded the MBE in 2003 for services to music education. He is an honorary fellow of Trinity College of Music, Oxford Brookes University and the Royal Birmingham Conservatoire. In 2019, he received honorary lifetime membership of Music Mark.

== Early life and education ==
Hallam was born in Leicester on 28 May 1948. When he was 11, he joined the Leicestershire School's Music Service as an extra-curricular activity, moving to play in the senior orchestra at age 13. Hallam studied at the Royal Academy of Music, completing an LGSM externally in 1967 and his LRAM in 1969. He then achieved his Certificate in Education at Trent Park College of Education. He received a B.A. in 1985 and an Advanced Education Diploma in Educational Management in 1991, both from the Open University. He married his wife Susan in 1971.

== Career ==
Hallam began working as a freelance musician, playing regularly with the City of Birmingham Symphony Orchestra, Orchestra da Camera, the BBC Midland Light Orchestra and BBC Midland Radio Orchestra in Birmingham, and on television and radio. He contributed to many recordings, including playing solo trumpet on "Theme from Z-Cars" on Norrie Paramor's Law Beat album. He toured with musicians such as Gene Pitney and backed artists such as Peter Gordeno and Bruce Forsyth in cabaret.

During this period he also worked as a part time brass teacher. In 1978, he became a full time instrumental teacher in Sandwell, teaching to pupils in a range of schools from small primary to large secondary.

In 1980, whilst continuing his freelance career, he joined the Oxfordshire Local Education Authority (LEA) as Head of the Brass Department, later becoming Senior Teacher in 1981 and Acting County Music Adviser in 1985. In 1987, he was appointed as Director of Music for the Oxfordshire LEA. As Director, Hallam increased the number of music schools and after school activities, workshops and holiday courses. He implemented a new vocal strategy and increased the breadth of instrumental tuition available as well as the range of musical genres.

Hallam was seconded to advise successive UK governments on music education in 2003 and, in 2008, left Oxfordshire to join the Department of Education as National Music Participation Director. The post was established in 2008 and Hallam is the only person to have held this position. In 2011, he became the National Music Education Grant Director to the Department of Education before retiring in 2012. From 2011 to 2012, he was also a consultant to the Department of Education and played a central role in the Henley Review of Music Education and the development of the National Plan for Music Education.

Hallam has written a substantial number of articles for professional music and educational publications. In addition he has written three chapters in books and one academic publication on effective partnership working in music education.

Hallam chaired the National Association of Music Educators from 2000 to 2002, the only person to serve two terms. He was elected President of the Incorporated Society of Musicians in 2013. In the same year, he was elected Chair of the Music Education Council (UK), a post which he held for six years. During this period he regularly presented at conferences in the UK and internationally.

Hallam contributed in the establishment of Sistema England, inspired by El Sistema, and was closely involved in setting up Sistema Europe and the Sistema Special Interest Group within the International Society of Music Educators (ISME), which he chaired from 2012 to 2014. He also chaired ISME’s National Affiliate group from 2016 to 2018.

From 2015 to 2018, Hallam was a lecturer and a module leader for the YOA Global Leaders Programme. He also then worked at the Guildhall School of Music and Drama on their Post Graduate Course in Performance Teaching from 2016 to 2018.

== Awards and honours ==
- 2001 - Elected Associate of the Royal Academy of Music (ARAM)
- 2003 - MBE for services to music education nationally and in Oxfordshire
- 2004 - Honorary Trinity College of Music (TCL)
- 2004 - Honorary Fellowship Oxford Brookes University
- 2008 - Honorary Fellowship Birmingham Conservatoire
- 2012 - Classic fm Music Teacher of the Year Lifetime Achievement Award
- 2019 - Honorary lifetime membership Music Mark

== Publications ==
- Effective Partnership Working in Music Education IJME May 2011
- Partnerships – why bother? Because none of us can do it alone, in Music and the Power of Partnerships ed H Coll and K Deane 2008
- More by Accident than Design, in Musical Pathways ed C Harrison and L McCullough NAME 2011
- Sistema: where academic, educational, musical, personal and social development all meet, in Listen Out: International Perspectives on Music Education ed C Harrison and S Hennessy NAME 2012
