= Modelland =

2011 novel by Tyra Banks

- First edition cover
- Author: Tyra Banks and Michael Salort
- Cover artist: Perry Harovas and James Schmitt; Tribeca Flashpoint Media Arts Academy
- Language: English
- Series: Modelland trilogy
- Genre: Young adult; Fantasy; Science fiction
- Publisher: Delacorte Books for Young Readers; Random House
- Publication date: September 13, 2011
- Publication place: United States
- Media type: Print (hardback)
- Pages: 576
- ISBN: 978-0-385-74059-3
- Dewey Decimal: 813.6
- LC Class: PZ7 .B22646

Modelland is a 2011 young adult novel written by model Tyra Banks and ghostwriter Michael Salort. In 2026, the novel regained attention online after a viral post on X brought renewed interest to its theme song.

== Plot summary ==
A young, awkward-looking girl with one ominous green eye by the name of Tookie De La Crème is kidnapped and forced to attend the legendary boarding school Modelland for a chance to join the Intoxibellas, the most celebrated models in the world. Along the way, she meets a plus-sized girl named Dylan, a 4-foot-7-inch (140 cm) girl named Shiraz, and a girl with albinism named Piper. Together, they form a strong bond as they face the trials and tribulations of Modelland, endeavoring to find the truth about why they were all accepted to it and why a mysterious impostor seems to want nothing more than for them to be gone.

== Development ==
Banks wrote on her blog that in 2006, "the words 'modeling boarding school' floated into [her] head while [she] was driving on the FDR highway in Manhattan". She had been thinking about why supermodels are "super", and the idea of Modelland came to mind.

== Reception ==
Publishers Weekly considered the book "overlong", "campy and warped", and a "nonstop barrage of surrealism and wackiness", but conceded that it could serve as a guilty pleasure. The Stony Brook Press praised Banks' approach of allegorically describing the process by which contestants are selected to appear on America's Next Top Model, but criticized the book's "inner conflict of (...) purpose", and described it as "tacky, predictable and superficial" and "exhausting" to read, while the Georgia Straight called it "a befuddling piece of dreckitude" and evidence that Banks is "certifiably batty". Bitch noted that although Modelland "promotes self-esteem and confidence in girls, it is less than empowering since it is all to a depressing consumerist end", calling it "a nonsensical, nightmarish, acid trip that seemed like it would never end" with "more made-up words and terms than a Klingon translation of a Dr. Seuss book", and emphasizing that it "stops being funny when you realize just how long it is".

In May 2021, Conor Lastowka and Michael J. Nelson selected the book for analysis on 372 Pages We'll Never Get Back, a podcast dedicated to books the hosts do not expect to like. Five years later, in a retrospective review published amid renewed interest in the novel, Taylor Lomax of Paper called the novel "long, arduous, maddening, futile and entirely an affront to [...] the English language".

== Theme song ==
A theme song for Modelland was released by Tyra Banks on October 25, 2011, on her YouTube channel under the title "Tyra Banks' Homemade Modelland Song". Banks released the self-produced song to promote and accompany the release of the book and encouraged readers to "pair your reading of Modelland with Tyra Banks' own Modelland song!".

=== Resurgence ===
The song gained renewed attention online in 2026 after a post on X referred to it as the "worst song of all time". In an article for Paper, Taylor Lomax described the song's composition as "modular avant-proto-hyperpop" and noted comparisons on X between the song and Tinashe's "Too Easy" (2026). Jason P. Frank of Vulture described the phenomenon as a "reminder of just how ridiculous Banks [...] can get", while noting its resurgence on short-form online video platform TikTok. Writing for The Fader, Tobias Hess described the song as "one of the more strange, unsettling and [...] thrilling pieces of audio you'll come across in your lifetime", likening its low-grade audio quality to "10 layers of YouTube-to-MP3 degradation".

== Other media ==
Modelland is the first installment of a proposed trilogy. However, no news has come out about a sequel.

In the seventeenth season of America's Next Top Model, which aired in late 2011, Banks instructs the four remaining contestants in the episode "Tyson Beckford" to perform as characters in the novel in a short film based on the book. Part 1 of the film was broadcast in that episode, part 2 in the season finale.

In February 2019, Banks announced on Twitter the opening of a theme park named after the novel in Santa Monica, California. On March 19, 2020, Banks announced that the opening would be delayed due to the COVID-19 pandemic. The theme park opened on September 2, 2022, at the Santa Monica Place mall. As of 2026, the theme park has closed.
