= B61 Institute =

Polish art and science ensemble

- Instytut B61
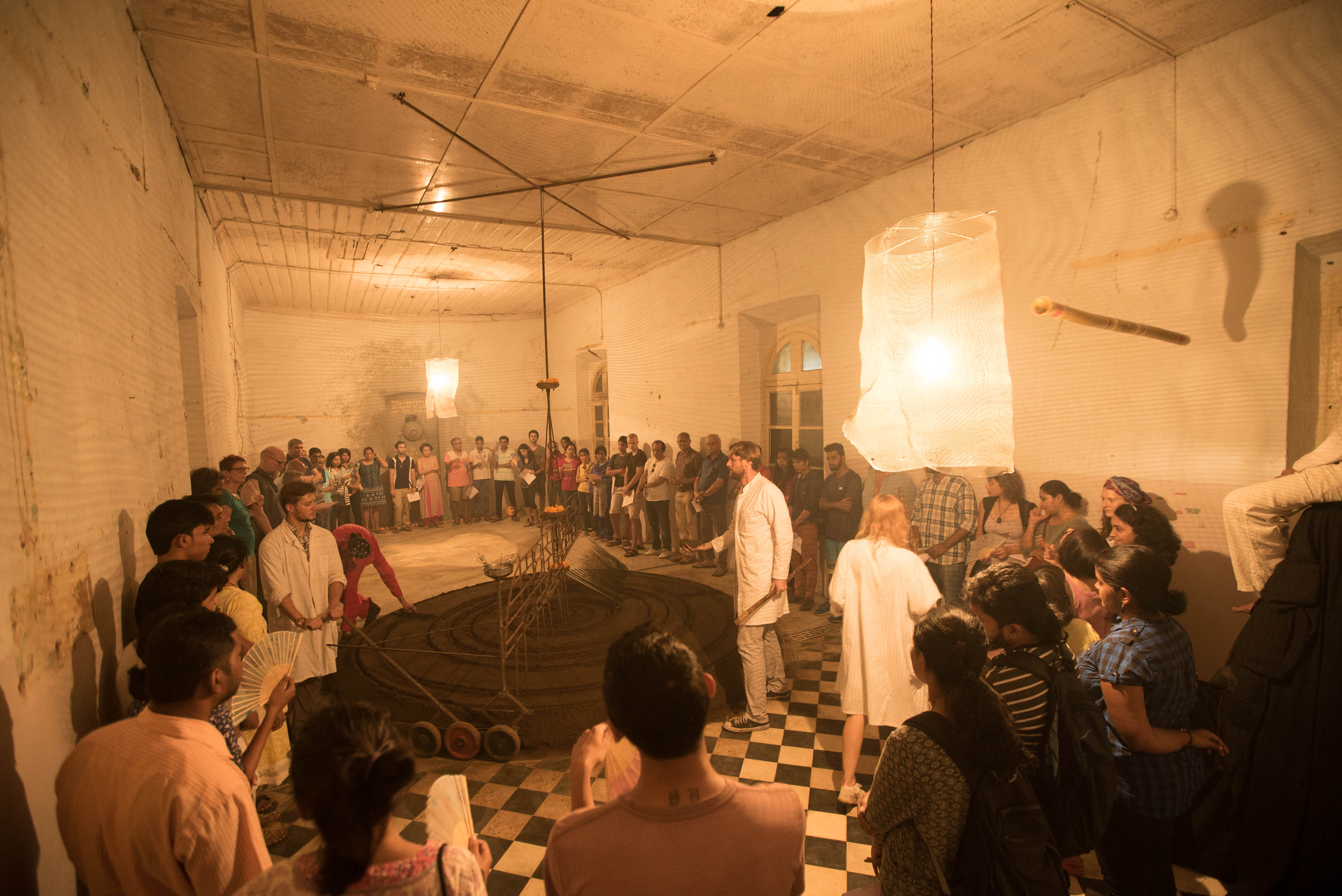
- Formation: 2009
- Founder: Jan Świerkowski
- Founded at: Poland
- Fields: Art and science
- Website: instytutb61.pl

Instytut B61 (B61 Institute) is an international art group belonging to the art and science trend. It was founded in 2009 in Toruń by the astronomer, curator and populariser of science Jan Świerkowski, supported by the Platon Foundation named after Kuba Rumiński. The B61 Institute is also the name of a fictional research facility where the action of artistic activities takes place. The Institute carries out art and science projects, mainly in the field of astronomy, in the form of immersive site-specific performances on the border of theatre, multimedia, happenings, concerts, field games and installation art.

== History ==
The B61 Institute was established in 2009 as an initiative of a group of students of the Faculty of Astronomy at the Nicolaus Copernicus University and artists from Toruń. They wanted to create an alternative, interdisciplinary multimedia show, combining scientific issues with art. The first premiere took place in 2009, as part of the International Year of Astronomy 2009, in the historic Fort I Fortress Toruń, and its theme was the phenomenon of the evolution of stars. To date, there have been 15 premieres of performances and two international interdisciplinary art projects. The projects were presented in Poland (including Toruń, Gdańsk, Kraków, Wrocław, Warsaw, Poznań, Bydgoszcz and Łódź) and abroad, e.g. in Estonia, India and Portugal

== The Team ==
The roles of fictional engineers of the B61 Institute are played by actual scientists and artists: actors, musicians, performers, happeners, multimedia artists, dancers, etc. The leader of the B61 Institute, the director and the author of the script is Jan Świerkowski, a Polish astronomer, science promoter and curator of projects combining science and art. In 2018, he was honoured for his activities at the B61 Institute with the title of Science Populariser 2017 in the animator category by the Polish Press Agency and the Ministry of Science and Higher Education. The permanent research staff of the B61 Institute consists of: Łukasz Ignasiński, Maciej Cegłowski, Dominik Smużny, Stefan Kornacki, Radosław Smużny, Mariusz Lubomski, Krystian Wieczyński, Paweł Tchórzewski, Krzysztof Wachowiak, and the Laxmi Bomb group. The B61 Institute was cooperated with, inter alia, Tomasz Stańko, Stanisław Tym, Michał Urbaniak, LUC, Katarzyna Groniec, SOFA, Organek, Kim Nowak, Łąki Łan, Eldo, Kortez, Antoni Gralak, Natu, Pinnawela, Łona, Bogdan Hołownia and Mazzoll, Organek, LUC, Kortez, Maja Kleszcz, Domowe Melodie.

== The most important projects ==
=== Cosmic Underground ===
The largest project of the B61 Institute, a multidisciplinary artistic and scientific project carried out in 2012. It was a two-month journey on a freight train, with the participation of an international team of 30 artists, co-creating ten thematic carriages. A special train with its own timetable set off in September 2012 from Estonia (Tallinn), stopping in Latvia (Riga), Lithuania (Vilnius) and Poland (Bydgoszcz).

=== “Re:volucao das Estrelas” ===
The multimedia performance of the B61 Institute, organised in June 2014, during the Polish Culture Festival in Lisbon, organised by the Embassy of the Republic of Poland in Lisbon. The project, involving more than 20 artists and scientists, was carried out in the centre of Lisbon, in the closed Restelo hospital. The festival was curated by the leader of the B61 Institute, Jan Świerkowski.

=== The Story of Space Festival: India ===
In November 2017, the B61 Institute performed during "The Story of Space" in Goa, India. The interdisciplinary show "Star Evolution" was staged in a postcolonial hospital, which used to be the first hospital of Western medicine in Asia.

=== "Stellar Entanglement" ===
The first realisation of the Institute in a digital version was created in 2019. The film was created as a result of cooperation between the B61 Institute and the directing duo The Kissinger Twins, authors of the Instagram series @Sufferrosa, awarded with the Webby Awards 2020.

== Bibliography ==
Art, Science and Cultural Understanding, ed. B. Wilson, B. Hawkins, S. Sim, Champaign 2014.
