= Sebastian Ruth =

Sebastian Ruth is an American violinist, violist, and music educator, and a 2010 MacArthur Fellow, receiving the award for "forging a new, multifaceted role beyond the concert hall for the twenty-first-century musician."

He is the founder of Community MusicWorks in Providence, Rhode Island, which works with young people in Providence neighborhoods “teaching them how to play string instruments".

In 2010, the program had 115 students, 51% Latino and 16% African-American.

Ruth's concept for Community MusicWorks "is to be as intrinsic to the fabric of a community as a clinic, library or church." Accordingly, the group "provides its students – who range from elementary to high school – with a long-term instrument loan, mentoring relationships with teachers, as well as opportunities through workshops and field trips."

Ruth is a 1997 graduate of Brown University and a faculty member at the Yale School of Music.

He also received a 2010 National Arts and Humanities Youth Program Award from Michelle Obama.

In 2012, Strings Magazine listed him as among "the 25 most influential people in the string music world".
