= Teatro del Lago =

Coordinates: 41°8′22.2″S 73°1′31.49″W

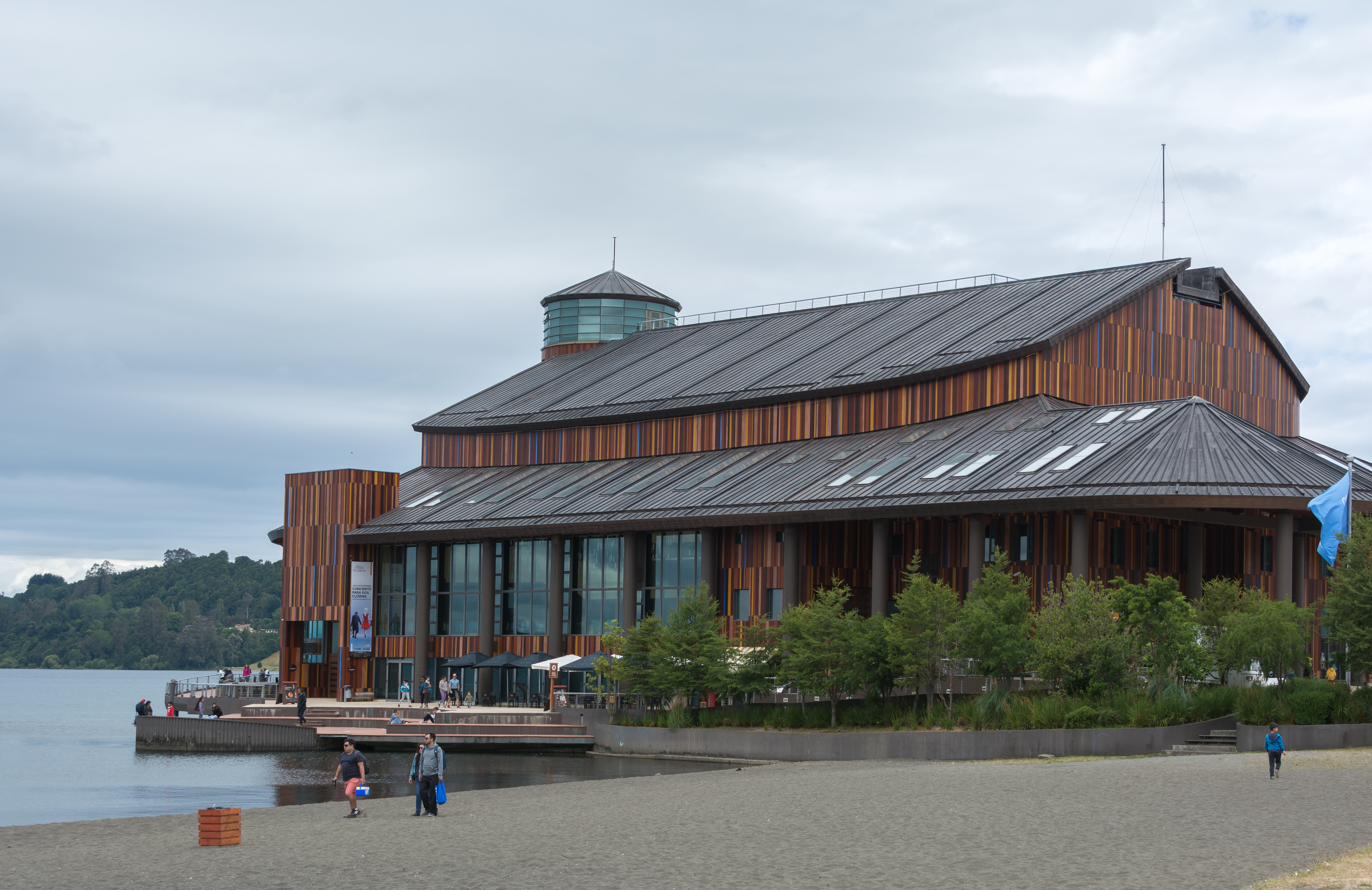
- Interactive map of Teatro del Lago
- Address: Avenida Bernardo Philippi 1000; Frutillar; Chile
- Capacity: 1200

Construction
- Opened: 2010
- Architects: Gerardo Köster y Gustavo Greene; Amercanda

Website
- teatrodellago.cl

The Teatro del Lago (Theatre of the Lake) is a stage theatre and concert hall located in Frutillar, Los Lagos Region, Chile.

== Overview ==
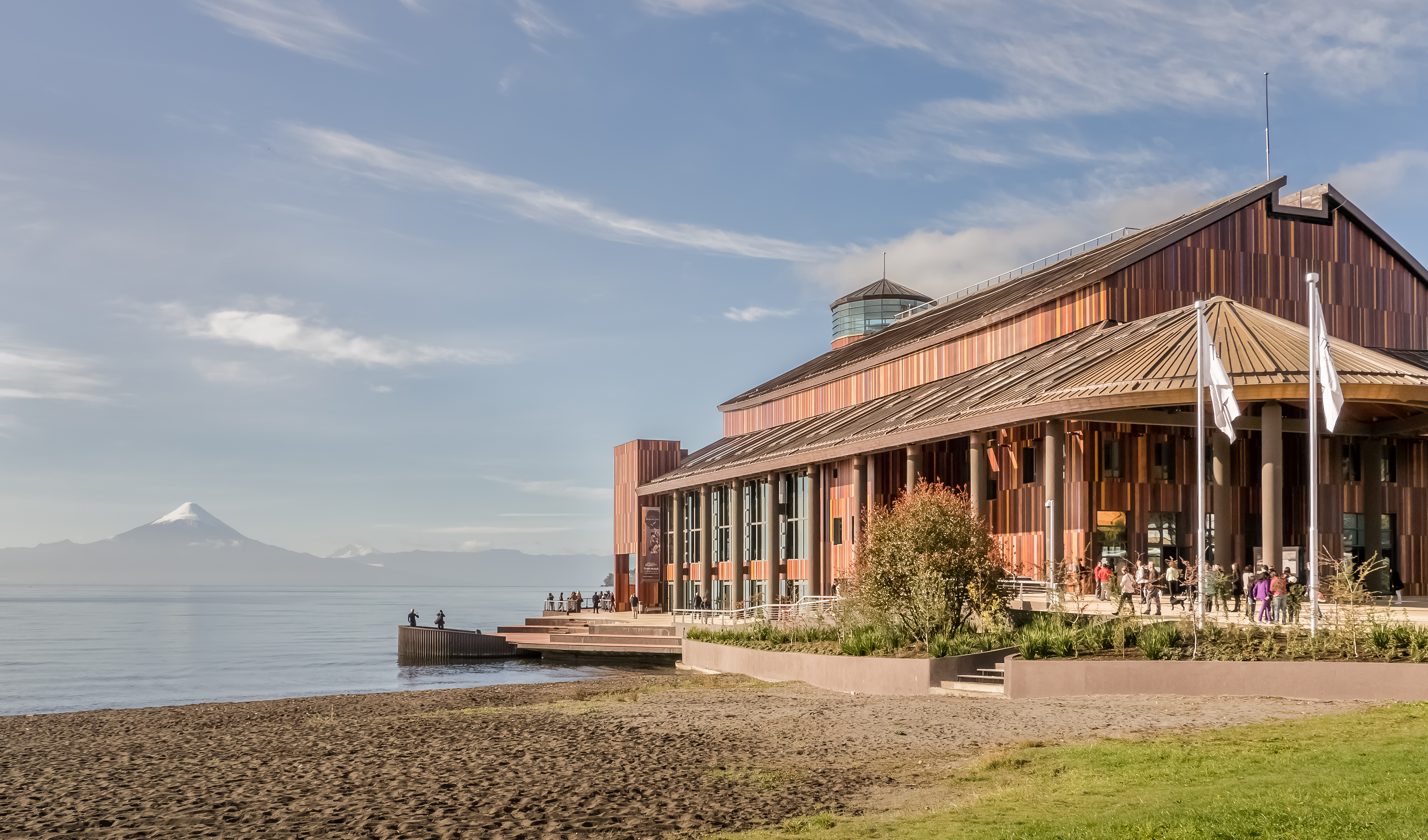
The Teatro del Lago.

Housed in a 10,000 m2 building, and located on the shores of Llanquihue Lake, the Teatro del Lago includes the 1,178 capacity Espacio Volcán Tronador – Sala Nestlé concert hall; an amphitheater, seating 270, and a range of other multipurpose salons and foyers, exhibition areas, rehearsal spaces, conference rooms and congress halls. The theater was designed by a host of architects over twelve years.

Every year, between late January and early February, the Teatro del Lago hosts its main event, the biggest Chilean classical music festival: the Semanas Musicales de Frutillar (Frutillar musical weeks).

== History ==
The construction of the theater to create a new cultural space to house the Semanas Musicals de Frutillar after the Hotel Frutillar burned down in 1996. Businessperson, Guillermo Schiess lead an effort to build a new home for the festival starting in 1998.

Architects Geradro Köster and Gustavo Greene began construction on January 27, 1998 with financial support from Schiess. The 1997 Asian financial crisis impacted his finances, which, in turn, caused the theater's construction to be modified.

In 2008 a new set of architects from Amercanda - Bernd Haller, Cristián Valdés, Pablo Cordua y Andrés Alvear - were added to the project to build with better acoustic materials. The Limarí Lightning Design company was in charge of the building's lightning, while the stage lightning was done by Clifton Taylor.

After twelve years of work, the theater opened on November 6, 2010 at a cost of $20 million (US). It immediately became one of the largest concert spaces ever opened in Chile since the 1950s.
