= Toufic Maatouk =

Lebanese orchestra conductor

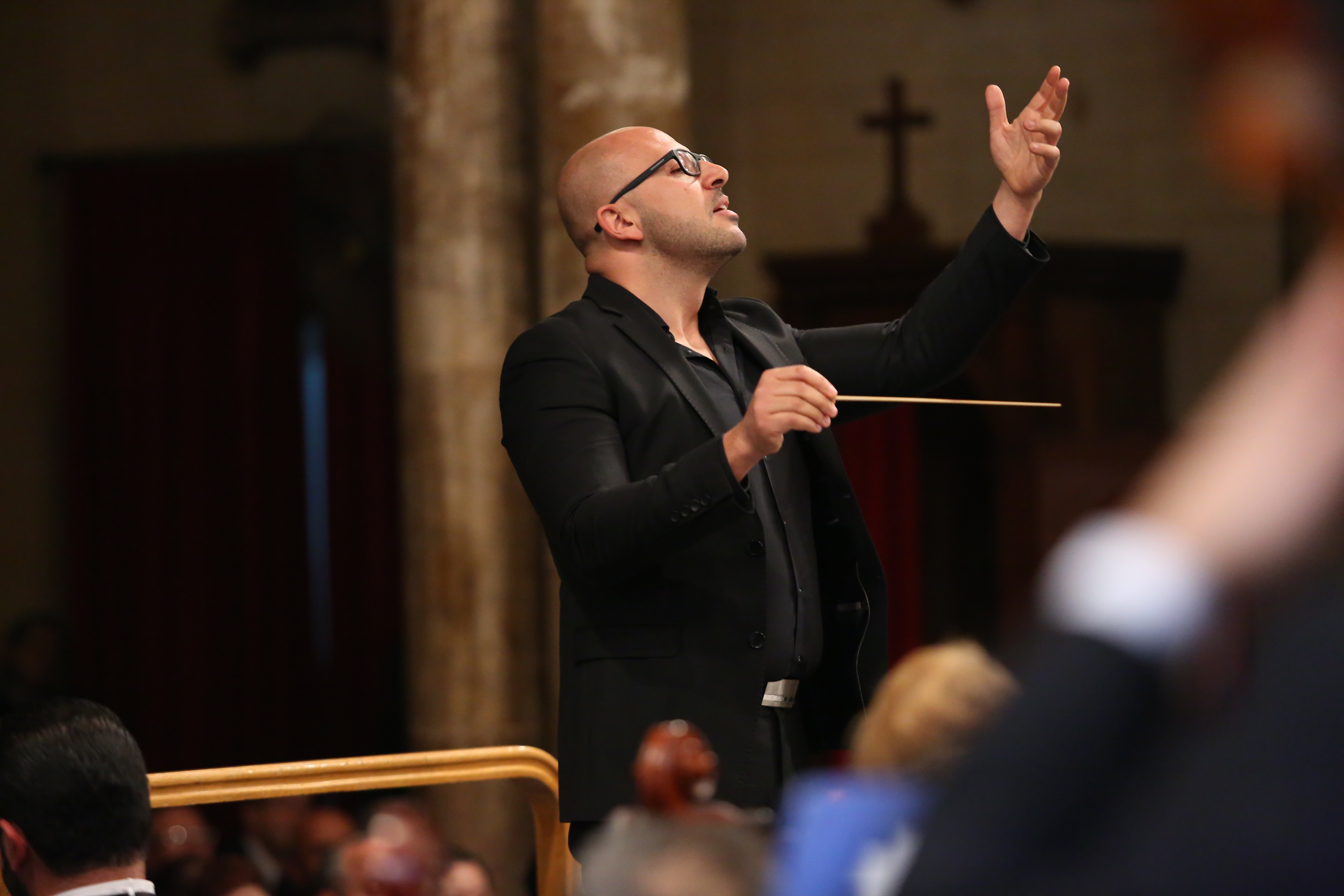
- Education: PhD from Pontifico Istituto di Musica Sacre
- Occupation: Orchestra Conductor

Toufic Maatouk is an orchestra conductor, and currently Deputy Executive Director at the Abu Dhabi Festival and Abu Dhabi Music and Arts foundation, guest conductor of the Lebanese Philharmonic Orchestra, Artistic Director of Beirut Chants International Festival, Artistic Director of the Chamber Music Season and the Antonine University chorus (Lebanon), and Head of the Vocal Department in the Lebanese National Higher Conservatory. He was also General Secretary and lecturer at the Antonine University in Beirut from 2017 to 2020, Director of the Antonine School of Music from 2005 to 2017.

== Education ==
Toufic Maatouk earned his PhD in Musicology from the Pontifical Institute of Sacred Music in Rome, then worked with Ennio Nicotra and Donato Renzetti on advanced studies in orchestra and opera conducting. He received his training as a vocal coach at the National Conservatory of Beirut during college. He started his career by working as a musical assistant conductor Teatro di San Carlo in Napoli. He led the Antonine Choir for 16 years, and collaborated with and took part in various festivals across several continents.

== Festivals ==
- Al-Ain International music festival (UAE)
- Bahrain International Music Festival (Bahrain)
- Al Bustan International Festival
- Baalbeck International Festival
- Byblos International Festival
- Beirut Chants Festival
- Festival d'ile de France (Paris, France)
- Teatro dell'Opera di Roma (Roma, Italy)
- Teatro di San Carlo (Napoli, Italy)
- Academie de l'Opera de Paris (Paris, France)
- Academie du Festival d'Aix en provence (France)
- Romanian Radio (Bucharest, Romania)
- Carnegie Hall (New York, USA)
- Amazon Theatre (Manaus, Brasil)
