= Lars H. Thunell =

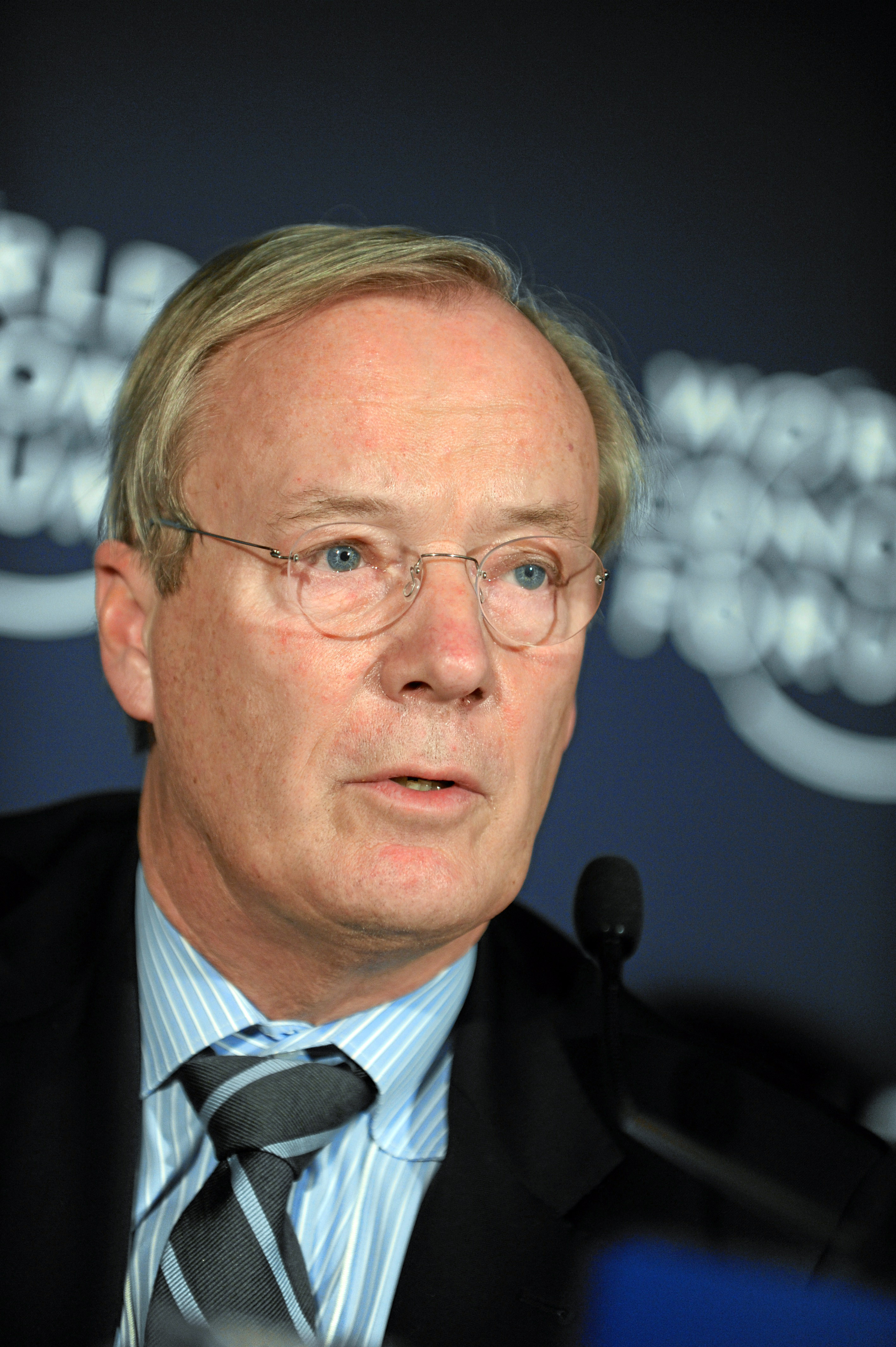
Thunell during the WEF 2011

Lars Henrik Thunell (born August 1948) is a Swedish businessman. He was the Executive Vice President and CEO of International Finance Corporation, a member of the World Bank Group.

Thunell was born in August 1948. He attended Stockholm University, where he majored in political science and received a doctorate.

Thunell has held a number of leading positions in Swedish and international businesses, among them at ABB in Zürich and American Express in New York. In the mid 1990s he was director of the Swedish insurance company Trygg-Hansa and retired as chief executive for the Swedish bank, Skandinaviska Enskilda Banken.
