= Hilda Ochoa-Brillembourg =

Venezuelan businesswoman (born 1945)

Personal details
- Born: 1945 (age 79–80) Caracas, Venezuela
- Education: Andrés Bello Catholic University (BS); Harvard University (MPA)

Hilda Margarita Ochoa-Brillembourg (born 1945, in Caracas) is a Venezuelan business woman and the current president and chief executive officer of Strategic Investment Group (SIG) which she founded in 1987. She is a former chief investment officer of the World Bank and a current member of several well known boards of directors.

== Early life and education ==
Ochoa-Brillembourg earned a BS in economics from the Universidad Catolica Andres Bello in Caracas. She is a chartered financial analyst (CFA) and received her MPA from the John F. Kennedy School of Government at Harvard University in 1971. As a Fulbright-Hays fellow, she completed all but dissertation toward a doctorate in business administration at the Harvard Business School.

== Career ==
Ochoa-Brillembourg served as both chief investment officer and asset and liability advisor at the World Bank. She was treasurer for CA Luz Eléctrica de Venezuela and independent financial consultant for the Development Ministry of Venezuela, the Foreign Relations Ministry of Venezuela, and Grupo Cisneros.

Ochoa-Brillembourg is the managing director of Ashmore EMM LLC. She is a member of the board of directors of the Atlantic Council, the World Bank/International Monetary Fund Credit Union, General Mills, Harvard Management Company, the McGraw-Hill Companies, National Symphony Orchestra the Washington Opera and is chair of The Orchestra of the Americas.

She is a member of the investment committee of the Rockefeller Family Fund, the advisory committees of the Rockefeller Center for Latin American Studies, the Hauser Center for Nonprofit Organizations at Harvard University, and Sun Trust-Asset Management Advisors.

Ochoa-Brillembourg is also a member of the executive committee of Small Enterprise Assistance Funds and is acting vice chairman of the Group of Fifty (G-50) at the Carnegie Endowment for International Peace.

She has published articles in Financial Analyst Journal and Pensions & Investments, and has been featured in Fortune, SmartMoney, Money Magazine, Investment News, CNN Español, MSNBC and Wall Street Week.

She received the Fulbright Association's 2005 Lifetime Achievement Medal.

She is currently a board member of Cementos Pacasmayo, the second largest cement producer in Peru.

Smart Money magazine included her among the Power 30 in Business. She was also named by Money magazine as one of the Top 50 Smartest Women in Business in the United States during 2000 and in 2002, Hispanic Business magazine listed her as one of the Top 50 Hispanic Women in Business.

== Personal life ==
She is married to Arturo E. Brillembourg.
