= Susan Hallam =

English academic, researcher and author

Susan Hallam MBE
- Born: 9 April 1949 (age 77); Leicester, England
- Spouse: Richard J. Hallam MBE (m. 1971)

Academic background
- Education: University of London; Royal Academy of Music

Susan Hallam MBE (born 9 April 1949) is an English academic, researcher and author. She is Emerita Professor of Education and Music Psychology at University College London.

Hallam's research is focused in two areas: music psychology and music education; and disaffection and learning. She has written 15 books and over 250 papers. She has been awarded lifelong membership of the British Psychology Society, the International Society for Music Education, and SEMPRE and honorary lifelong membership of Music Mark. Hallam was awarded the MBE in 2015 for services to music education.

== Education and early career ==
Hallam was born in Leicester on 9 April 1949. When she was 10, she joined the Leicestershire School's Music Service as an extra-curricular activity, moving to play in the senior orchestra at age 11. Later, she attended the Royal Academy of Music (RAM).

Whilst at the RAM, Hallam undertook freelance professional work as an orchestral violinist. In 1971, she joined the BBC Midland Light Orchestra in Birmingham and became Principal Second Violin. During this time she also carried out a wide range of freelance work including becoming deputy leader of the Orchestra da Camera, and working in theaters and as a member of supporting bands for musicians such as Cilla Black, Gene Pitney, Lovelace Watkins, Frank Ifield and Tommy Steel. She married Richard J. Hallam in 1971.

Hallam began teaching the violin to individual pupils whilst still at the RAM and, on moving to Birmingham, in addition to her performing career, she continued her teaching for the Local education authority and local private schools, to individual and small groups of pupils. In 1978, Hallam took up a full-time teaching post with Sandwell Education Authority after completing her Certificate in Education at Birmingham Polytechnic whilst continuing her freelance playing. This followed a decision to change the direction of her career into psychology and education.

In 1979, Hallam moved with her husband to Oxfordshire Local Authority as a full-time peripatetic violin teacher, subsequently establishing the Thame Area Music School, becoming Area co-ordinator for East Oxfordshire, where she established an area string orchestra, and then became Head of Strings.

== Later career ==
In the early 1980s, Hallam decided to change her career from music education to Psychology of Education. She enrolled at London University for an M.Sc. in Psychology of Education, completing it in 1983. Later she started tutoring for the Open University and took up a post in a Further Education College. This was for a very brief period in September 1991 after which she became lecturer in Psychology of Education in the Department of Educational Psychology and Special Educational Needs at the Institute of Education, London University. In 1993, Hallam completed her Ph.D. in Psychology of Education from London University.

In 1997, Hallam became Senior Lecturer at the Institute of Education, London University and in 2000 took up a Chair in Education at Oxford Brookes University. She returned to the Institute of Education, London University in January 2001 as Reader to take responsibility for leading the lecturer training programme. Subsequently, this led to an interest in the quality of teaching in Higher Education and her recruitment to the Quality Assurance Agency as an auditor. In 2003, she became Chair of Education and head of the Department of Lifelong Education and International Development, and in 2007 Dean of the Faculty of Policy and Society, a position that she held until her retirement in 2014.

Hallam has served as Chair of the Psychology of Education Section of the British Psychological Society three times, from 1999 to 2001, from 2004 to 2006, and from 2012 to 2013.

Hallam served as the Editor of the Psychology of Music from 2002 to 2007. In 2011, she was appointed as the Co-Editor of Music Performance Research.

== Research and work ==
Hallam's research has been focused in two areas: music psychology and music education; and disaffection and learning.

=== Music Psychology and Music Education ===
Hallam's background as a musician led her to focus her Masters' dissertation and Ph.D. on music. Her Ph.D. thesis uncovered the nature of instrumental practice from players at beginner standard to those at the highest professional level. It also led to research considering how public performance might be optimised.

The second music psychology strand was instigated by a request from the BBC for guidance on how to assess the impact of the Mozart effect on live television. This led to a wide range of research examining the effects of making music on cognitive, personal and social development in children and young people, with a particular focus on reviewing existing literature. Hallam's later work extended this to focus on the impact of making music on older people.

=== Disaffection and learning ===
In 1994, the UK Conservative government took a decision to collate all data relating to absenteeism in schools in England. Hallam decided to become a part of the project. Working with Caroline Roaf, interviews from the project showed patchy provision across the country for children not attending school. A publication containing advice on how to improve attendance in schools was funded by Gulbenkian, entitled ‘Here Today, Here, Tomorrow’ and was provided, free, to every school in the country.

Further contracts from the Government followed looking at behaviour and attendance in school and also work on ability grouping funded by the Economic and Social Research Council (ESRC). These interests continued throughout Hallam's career, particularly those related to ability grouping.

Representing the interface between school and home, homework became an area of interest revealing the extremely complex interactions within the home and between home and school.

== Awards and honors ==
- 1994 - Conferred as a Chartered Psychologist by the British Psychological Society
- 1995 - Elected as an Associate Fellow of the British Psychological Society (AFBPsS)
- 1996 - Elected as a Fellow of the Royal Society for the Promotion of the Arts, Manufacturing and Commerce (FRSA)
- 2002 - Conferred as an Academician of the Social Sciences (FAss)
- 2001 – Fellow of the Institute for Learning and Teaching in Higher Education (now Higher Education Academy)
- 2006 - Associate of the Royal Academy of Music
- 2014 - Became honorary lifetime member of the International Society for Music Education
- 2014 - Awarded lifelong honorary membership of the British Psychological Society
- 2015 - Member of the Order of the British Empire (MBE) for services to Music Education
- 2017 - SEMPRE Lifetime Achievement Award
- 2019 - Honorary Lifelong Membership of Music Mark
- 2020 - Lifetime achievement award, Music & Drama Education Awards, Rhinegold Publishing
- 2023 - Fellowship of the Royal Academy of Music

== Books ==
- Hallam, S., Blatchford, P., & May, D. (Eds) (1993) Psychology of Education II: Individual and Social Psychology Subject Guide. London: University of London.
- Hallam, S. & Roaf, C. (1995) Here Today, Here Tomorrow: Helping Schools to Promote Attendance. London: Gulbenkian Foundation.
- Hallam, S. (1996) Improving School Attendance. London: Heinemann
- Hallam, S. (1998) Instrumental Teaching: A Practical Guide to Better Teaching and Learning. Oxford: Heinemann
- Blatchford, P., Crowley, C., Hallam, S., & Reynolds, Y. (1999) Psychology of Education II: Individual and Social Psychology Subject Guide (2nd revised edition). London: University of London.
- Ireson, J. & Hallam, S. (2001) Ability Grouping in Education. London: Sage Publications
- Hallam, S., Ireson, J., & Davies, J. (2002) Effective Pupil Grouping in the Primary School – a Practical Guide. London: Fulton
- Hallam, S. (2002) Ability Grouping in Schools: A Literature Review, Institute of Education, University of London
- Hallam, S. (2004) Homework: The Evidence. London: Institute of Education, University of London
- Hallam, S. (2006) Music Psychology in Education. Institute of Education, University of London
- Hallam, S & Rogers, L. (2008) Improving Behaviour and Attendance at School. Milton Keynes: Open University Press
- Hallam, S. & Gaunt, H. (2012) Preparing for Success: A Practical Guide for Young Musicians. London: Institute of Education Press
- Creech, A., Hallam, S., McQueen, H., & Varvarigou, M. (2014). Active Ageing with music: Supporting Well Being in the Third and Fourth Ages. London: IOE Press
- Hallam, S. (2014) The Power of Music: A Research Synthesis of the Impact of Actively Making Music on the Intellectual, Social and Personal Development of Children and Young People. London: iMERC
- Hallam, S. & Rogers, L. (2018). Homework: The Evidence (2nd ed). London: IOE Press
- Hallam, S. (2018). The Psychology of Music. London: Routledge
- Creech, A, Varvarigou, M & Hallam S. (2020) Contexts for music learning and participation: Developing and sustaining musical possible selves. Palgrave Macmillan Cham, Switzerland.
- Hallam, S. and Himonides, E. (2022) The power of music: An exploration of the evidence. Open Book Publishers

=== Edited books ===
- Hallam, S., Cross, I. & Thaut, M. (eds) (Forthcoming) The Oxford Handbook of Music Psychology (3rd edition). Oxford: Oxford University Press.
- Hallam, S., Cross, I. & Thaut, M. (eds) (2016) Oxford Handbook of Music Psychology (2nd edition) Oxford: Oxford University Press.
- Hallam, S. (2026) Practice makes perfect: Understanding the acquisition of musical expertise. Jenny Standford Publishing Pte Ltd
- Creech, A., Hodges, D. & Hallam, S. (eds) (2021) Routledge International Handbook of Music Psychology in Education and the Community. London: Routledge
- Hallam, S., Cross, I. & Thaut, M. (eds) (2016) Oxford Handbook of Music Psychology (2nd edition) Oxford: Oxford University Press.
- Hallam, S. & Creech, A. (Eds) (2010) Music Education in the 21st Century in the United Kingdom: Achievements, analysis and aspirations. Institute of Education, University of London
- Hallam, S., Cross, I. & Thaut, M. (eds) (2008) Oxford Handbook of Music Psychology Oxford: Oxford University Press.
