= Carla Dirlikov Canales =

American mezzo-soprano singer

Carla Canales
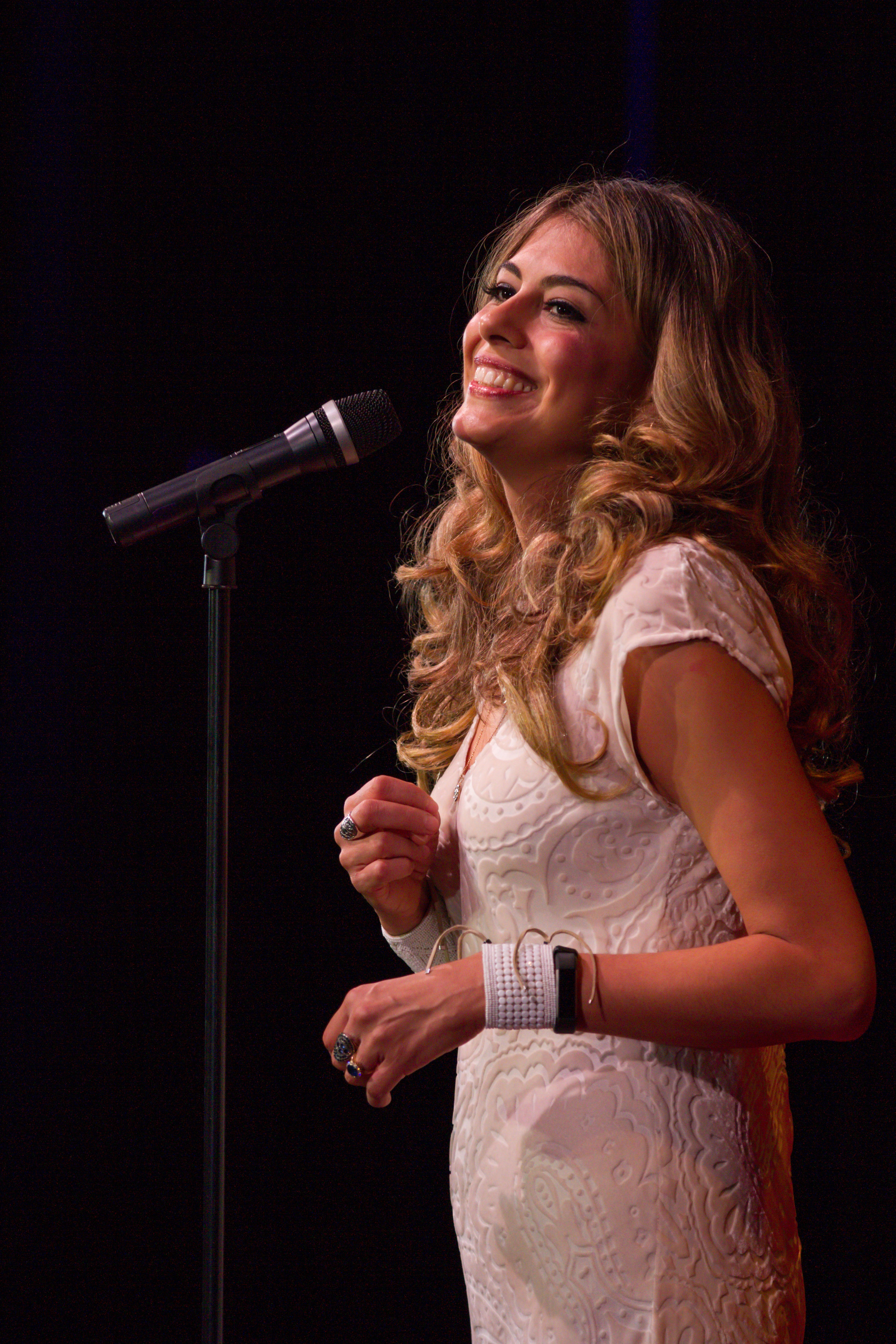
- Born: Carla Dirlikov Canales; Midland, Michigan, U.S.
- Citizenship: United States
- Occupations: Mezzo-soprano singer; Cultural Diplomat; Arts Advocate; Senior Advisor and Envoy for Cultural Exchange; National Endowment for the Arts
- Organizations: The Canales Project (Founder since 2016); U.S. Department of State (Arts Envoy since 2005)
- Website: carlacanales.com

Carla Dirlikov Canales is an American mezzo-soprano singer, educator, cultural diplomat, arts advocate, author, and non-profit entrepreneur.

== Early life and education ==
Canales was born in Midland, Michigan, the daughter of a Bulgarian father and a Mexican mother. She earned a bachelor's degree in vocal performance from the University of Michigan and a master's degree in opera performance from McGill University. Canales also attended the Academy of Vocal Arts in Philadelphia and the Paris Conservatory.

Canales also holds an Executive Education Certificate from Harvard's Kennedy School of Government and was a 2021 Advanced Leadership Initiative Fellow at Harvard University. She is currently a fellow at Harvard University's Kennedy School.

== Career ==
Canales has earned critical acclaim as an international opera singer. She has performed the title role in Bizet's Carmen close to one hundred times in twelve countries. Other notable roles include Dalilah in Samson et Dalilah, Eboli in Don Carlo, and Giulietta in Les Contes d'Hoffmann.

As a concert soloist, Canales has performed at venues including Lincoln Center's Avery Fisher Hall and Carnegie Hall. She has also performed extensively as a soloist in China with the China National Symphony Orchestra, the Qingdao Symphony Orchestra, the Shenzhen Symphony Orchestra, the Guangzhou Opera, China's National Center for the Performing Arts, and at the Forbidden City Concert Hall.

In 2020, Carla released her debut album, "Duende," which received critical acclaim for its fusion of Spanish folk melodies with electronic elements.

As an advocate for arts and culture, Canales has been recognized in multiple capacities, including being named an "Arts Envoy" by the U.S. Department of State.

Canales has been a guest speaker at the United Nations, the Aspen Institute, the White House Initiative for Educational Excellence for Hispanics, and the TEDxMidAtlantic conference. She is the first opera singer on Foreign Policy Magazine's annual listing of 100 Leading Global Thinkers and the first to join the President's Committee for the Arts and the Humanities Turnaround Arts program. In 2017, she joined the Artists Committee of the Americans for the Arts. She was also a co-founder and the artistic director for CultureSummit Abu Dhabi.

Canales has been recognized as a prominent Hispanic artist and activist. She has performed at the Hispanic Heritage Awards. In 2014, she was a featured artist at the White House Initiative for Educational Excellence for Hispanics' Policy Forum for Music and the Arts.

In 2016, Canales founded The Canales Project, a US-based 501(c)(3) organization that uses music and the arts to address social concerns, raise awareness of identity and culture, and promote cross-cultural understanding.

In 2023, Canales joined the Biden Administration as the first Senior Advisor and Envoy for Cultural Exchange at the National Endowment for the Arts in the United States.

Canales has published a number of articles and book chapters, including a guest op-ed for the New York Times titled “For the U.S. and China, It Starts With Listening” (Oct 7, 2023), a guest op-ed for USA Today titled “Biden should name a secretary of culture and creative industries to drive economic growth”, and book chapters in two recent publications about cultural diplomacy, including “Cultural Diplomacy: Issues and Perspectives” and “Soft Power and the Future of U.S. Foreign Policy.”

== Awards and recognitions ==
- In 2014, Canales received the Sphinx Medal of Excellence.
- In 2015, she was named one of Foreign Policy Magazine's 100 Leading Global Thinkers
- In December 2017, she was honored with a Bicentennial Alumni Award from the University of Michigan as part of their 200th Anniversary Initiative.
- In 2017, Canales received the Michigan Alliance for the Arts Lifetime Achievement Award.
- In 2018, she was honored by Musical America as one of its Movers & Shapers.
- In 2021, she became a member of the Recording Academy.
