= Louisiana Philharmonic Orchestra =

American orchestra

- Orchestra
- Founded: 1991
- Location: New Orleans, Louisiana
- Concert hall: Orpheum Theater
- Music director: Matthew Kraemer
- Website: www.lpomusic.com

The Louisiana Philharmonic Orchestra (LPO) is an American orchestra based in New Orleans, Louisiana. It is the only full-time, professional orchestra in the Gulf South. The orchestra performs at the Orpheum Theater.

The Louisiana Philharmonic Orchestra's music director is Matthew Kraemer. The LPO performs a full 36-week concert season featuring an array of Classics, Casual Classics, Family, Education, and Outreach concerts, as well as Special Events. The members of the LPO are home-based in New Orleans and serve the Gulf South region. LPO is the longest-standing musician-governed and collaboratively operated professional symphony in the United States.

== History ==
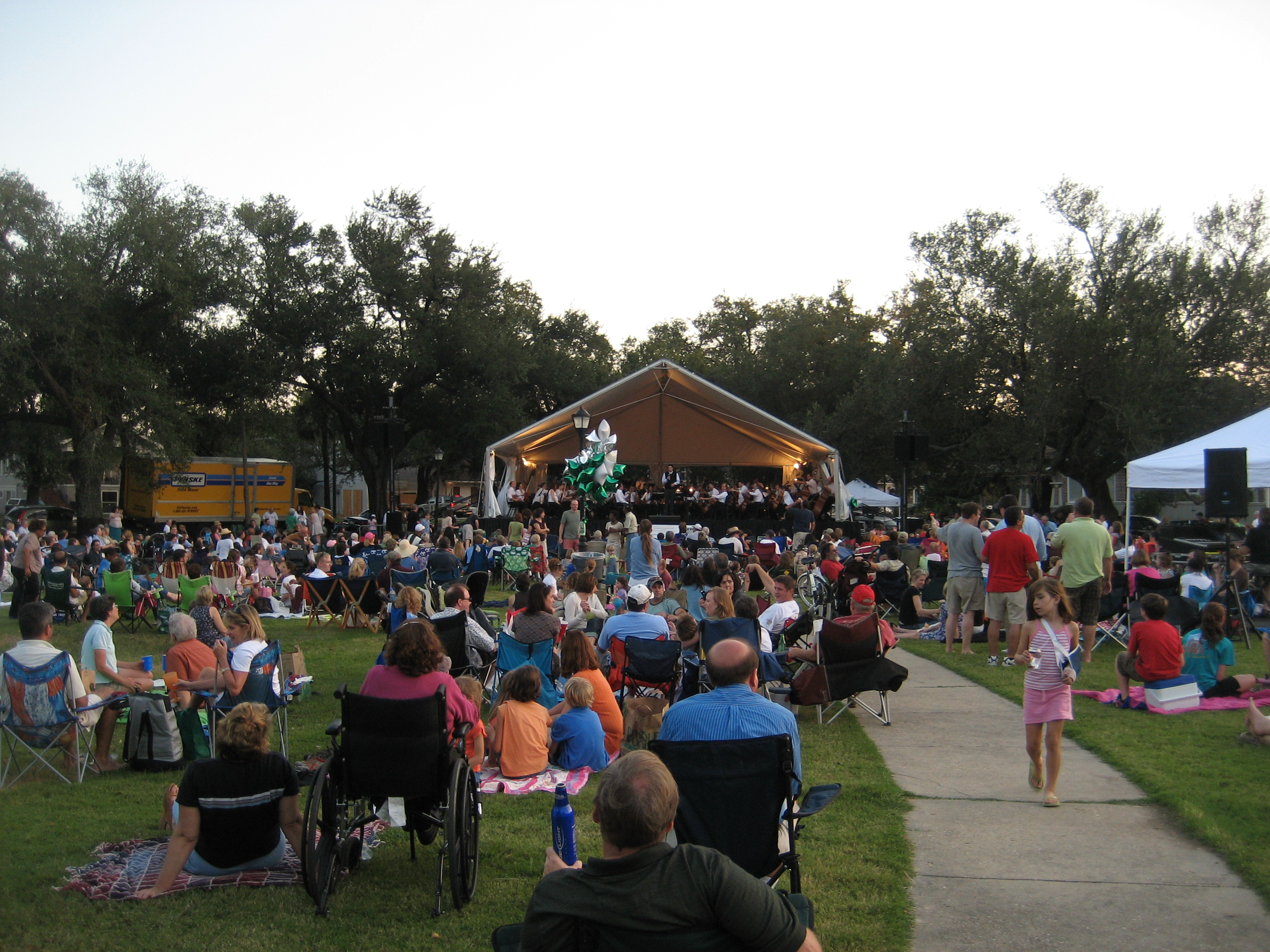
LPO concert in Palmer Park, 2008.

The LPO was founded in September 1991 upon the demise that year of the New Orleans Philharmonic-Symphony Orchestra, as it was called, by musicians from that ensemble; music director Maxim Shostakovich did not continue, however.

The LPO's first music director was Klauspeter Seibel (1936–2011), until his retirement in 2005. His work was widely praised in eulogies of his death in Hamburg, Germany, on January 8, 2011.

Hurricane Katrina in August 2005 caused the LPO's musicians to evacuate. Their venue, the Orpheum Theater, flooded. Members of the orchestra began performing at alternate locations in 2006. One of these locations was Palmer Park.

The Orpheum Theater reopened in August 2015. Its inaugural gala took place on September 17: a concert by the LPO. The orchestra has since established itself as anchor tenant of the venue. The LPO also performs at the Mahalia Jackson Theater for the Performing Arts for films and large productions.

The LPO also serves as the orchestra for New Orleans Opera Association and Delta Festival Ballet that began in 1976 (as New Orleans Philharmonic-Symphony Orchestra) for a co-presentation of Sleeping Beauty.

On February 17, 2023, the LPO announced their next music director, Matthew Kraemer. Kraemer began his tenure as the orchestra's third music director on July 1, 2023.

In recent years, the LPO has begun to collaborate more with local artists. In January 2022, the orchestra performed with Tank and The Bangas on a full concert at the Orpheum Theater. The orchestra followed that performance with a collaboration with the Lost Bayou Ramblers on January 15, 2023. On August 18th, 2023, the LPO released a collaborative album with the Lost Bayou Ramblers, called Live: Orpheum Theater NOLA. The album went on to win at the 65th annual Grammy Awards for Best Regional Roots Music Album.

In April 2023, the orchestra brought together local bounce legend Big Freedia to perform with the orchestra. This was the first time that a bounce artist performed with an orchestra. This concert was also recorded and released as a live album on April 19, 2024, as Big Freedia's first live album titled Big Freedia with the Louisiana Philharmonic: Live at The Orpheum Theater.

== Performances/Tours ==
The orchestra appeared in New York City in October 2005 in a joint concert with the New York Philharmonic at Avery Fisher Hall in Lincoln Center. The concert was in benefit of the LPO musicians affected by Hurricane Katrina.

On February 27, 2018, the LPO made its Carnegie Hall debut in Stern Auditorium on the Perelman Stage. The program was part of the celebration of Philip Glass and the LPO was chosen by the composer himself. The program featured Glass' “Days and Nights in Rocinha” (1997) and the Concerto Fantasy for Two Timpanists and Orchestra (2000) as well as Silvestre Revueltas's “La Noche de los Mayas.” The encore on the program was Gabriela Ortiz's “Antrópolis”. The program was conducted by music director at the time, Carlos Miguel Prieto.

== Musical Louisiana ==
In partnership with The Historic New Orleans Collection, the LPO annually offers a live concert broadcast online that highlights the cultural heritage of Louisiana and the Gulf South. It is estimated this concert, along with its corresponding education materials, impacts more than 50,000 middle-school students across the state of Louisiana. The concert takes place annually at the historic St. Louis Cathedral.

Concert History
=== Year ===	=== Concert Title ===
2022	Concert Spirituel: Saint-Domingue and New Orleans
2020	Vienna, Leipzig, and New Orleans
2019	Direct from New Orleans!
2018	Music of the City
2017	Uniquely New Orleans: The Classical Tradition and Jazz
2016	A Fair to Remember: The 1884–1885 Concert Season in New Orleans
2015	New Orleans and the Spanish World
2014	Postcards from Paris
2013	Envisioning Louisiana
2012	Becoming American: The Musical Journey
2011	Identity, History, Legacy: La Société Philharmonique
2010	Made in Louisiana
2009	An die Musik: The German Heritage of New Orleans
2008	Music of the Mississippi
2007	A New Orleanian in Paris: Ernest Guiraud, Friends, and Students

== Education and Community Outreach ==
A significant portion of the orchestra's programming is dedicated to the music education needs of children in the Greater New Orleans area. Each year, more than 12,000 New Orleans students benefit from the orchestra's educational programming. Students in the Greater New Orleans area have access to the following educational programs.

=== Early Explorer Concerts ===
The orchestra's Early Explorer Concerts combine hands-on interaction with orchestra musicians, music curricula, and an age-appropriate full orchestra concert tailor-made for young children. Early Explorers concerts target pre-K through first-grade students in the Greater New Orleans region, 62% of whom are Title 1 students.

=== Young People's Concerts ===
Young People's Concerts (YPC) combine one-on-one interaction with musicians, full orchestra concerts, and music curriculum for teachers. Students attending YPCs have the opportunity to learn to play the recorder or violin through the LPO's partnership with the Link Up program at Carnegie Hall's Weill Music Institute. Students are then invited to play with the orchestra in concert. YPCs target middle-school students in the Greater New Orleans region, 57% of whom are Title 1 students.

== Music Directors ==
- Klauspeter Seibel (1991–2005)
- Carlos Miguel Prieto (2005–2023)
- Matthew Kraemer (2023–present)

== See also ==
- Klauspeter Seibel in the German Wikipedia.
- Jeannette Knoll
