= Rohit Deshpande =

American economist

Rohit Deshpande is the Baker Foundation Professor and Sebastian S. Kresge Professor of Marketing, Emeritus at Harvard Business School. Over the years, he has contributed extensively to executive education, delivering courses in programs such as the Advanced Management Program, the General Management Program, the Program for Leadership Development, and the Owner/President Management Program. He is currently co-instructing the MBA field-based course “Business of the Arts.” Within the MBA curriculum, he has previously taught global branding, international marketing, and core marketing, as well as a doctoral-level seminar on marketing management.

Professor Deshpandé serves as faculty chair of the Global Colloquium on Participant-Centered Learning. His leadership roles have included overseeing Marketing faculty recruitment, coordinating doctoral admissions for the Marketing program, and chairing the Strategic Marketing Management executive education course. He also leads Harvard Business School’s research efforts in South Asia. Notably, he played a key role in the development and delivery of the MBA’s required Leadership and Corporate Accountability (LCA) course, which addresses ethical decision-making and corporate governance. He also chaired the LCA executive program in India.

He was honored with the Henry B. Arthur Fellowship for Business Ethics in 2008–2009 and received the Robert F. Greenhill Award in 2015 in recognition of his exceptional service to the HBS community. His recent case studies, “Terror at the Taj” and “Street Symphony,” earned Silver Telly Awards, and his co-authored article “Consumers avoid buying from firms with higher CEO-to-worker pay ratios” was awarded the 2021 Park Best Paper Award by the Journal of Consumer Psychology.

In a 1998 address at an American Marketing Association meeting, Deshpandé introduced the now widely adopted concept of “customer-centricity,” ahead of its mainstream acceptance among global corporations. His research in this area has highlighted leading customer-focused organizations across Asia, Europe, and the Americas. He is a prolific contributor to marketing literature, and a study by the American Marketing Association identified him as one of the most published full professors in the field. His latest contributions are captured in Customer Centricity, part of the Core Readings in Marketing Series.

Expanding on this theme, he is now exploring how customer-centric principles apply to audience engagement in the arts and culture sectors. His case studies delve into marketing in jazz (“Wynton Marsalis & Jazz at Lincoln Center”), theater (“American Repertory Theater”), media and personal branding (“Tyra Banks: Personal Branding”), visual arts (“The Louvre”), and classical music (“The Los Angeles Philharmonic Orchestra: Cultural Entrepreneurship,” “Yo-Yo Ma and Silk Road,” and “Street Symphony”).

He has held editorial board positions for leading journals, including the Journal of Marketing, Journal of Marketing Research, Journal of International Marketing, International Journal of Research in Marketing, Journal of Business Research, and the Asian Journal of Marketing. He serves on the Executive Directors Council of the Marketing Science Institute and has been a member of the American Marketing Association’s Board of Directors.

Beyond academia, Deshpandé has been involved in marketing research consulting and served as a principal in an electronics manufacturing enterprise. He is a member of the honor societies Beta Alpha Psi and Omicron Delta Kappa and is listed in Who’s Who in America. His professional activities include consulting and executive teaching engagements across North America, Europe, and Asia. At Harvard, he sits on the University Committee on the Arts and is an advisory board member for the American Repertory Theater. He also serves on the Board of Directors of Silkroad, an arts organization founded by Yo-Yo Ma.

Prior to joining Harvard, he held the E. B. Osborn Professorship of Marketing at the Amos Tuck School at Dartmouth College. His earlier academic appointments include positions as Associate and Assistant Professor of Marketing at the University of Texas at Austin, Visiting Professor and Scholar at Stanford Graduate School of Business, and Thomas Henry Carroll Ford Foundation Visiting Professor at HBS. From 1997 to 1999, he was Executive Director of the Marketing Science Institute.

Professor Deshpandé holds a B.Sc. with Honors and Distinction and an M.M.S. from the University of Bombay, an M.B.A. from Northwestern University, and a Ph.D. from the University of Pittsburgh, which awarded him its Distinguished Alumnus Award in 2008.

== Awards ==
- Henry B. Arthur Fellow
- Robert F. Greenhill award
- Silver Telly Award
- Journal of Consumer Psychology Park Best Paper Award
