= Eloísa Maturén =

Venezuelan journalist and actress

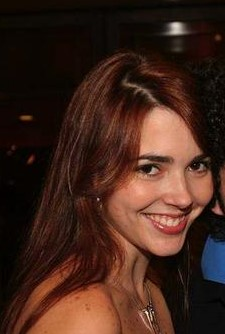
- Maturén in 2006
- Born: Eloísa Maturén Vallado; 4 February 1980 (age 46); Caracas, Venezuela
- Education: Central University of Venezuela
- Occupations: Journalist, actress, cultural entrepreneur
- Spouse: Gustavo Dudamel (m. 2006; div. 2015)
- Children: 1

Eloísa Maturén Vallado (born 4 February 1980) is a Venezuelan journalist, actress, cultural entrepreneur, and former dancer.

== Biography ==
Eloísa Maturén began her academic dance studies in Caracas, at the Escuela Ballet-Arte, and graduated after seven years. She immediately joined the cast of the ballet company of the Teresa Carreño Theater, the national ballet of Venezuela, under the artistic direction of Vicente Nebrada.

At the same time that she was developing her career as a ballerina, she studied social communication at the Central University of Venezuela, graduating cum laude. She worked as a correspondent for the newspaper El Nacional and the magazine Todo en Domingo, as well as an announcer for the station Unión Radio.

For a time she moved to Madrid, and later to London, where she studied contemporary dance, theater, and English.

In 2008, Maturén ventured into production management when she founded Ciclorama Producciones Escénicas, a company dedicated to the production of dance, theater, and film events in Venezuela and abroad. With this company, she put on the Festival Viva Nebrada in 2008, 2010, and 2013.

Maturén was executive producer of the documentaries Dudamel: El sonido de los niños, by director Alberto Arvelo, and Don Armando, by Jonathan Reverón.

In 2012 she entered the field of acting, upon receiving an invitation from Venezuelan director Fina Torres to participate in the film Liz in September, where she performed alongside Patricia Velásquez, Elba Escobar, Mimí Lazo, Sheila Monterola, and Arlette Torres.

== Festival Viva Nebrada ==
In 2008, on the initiative of Eloísa Maturén, the Festival Viva Nebrada was created. This event seeks to keep Vicente Nebrada's choreographical legacy alive for new generations in Venezuela, as well as to promote and support Venezuelan choreographers, providing them with an appropriate platform for the development of their creativity. Conceived as a multidisciplinary gathering, it has a place for the different manifestations of dance, with themes that focus on bringing dance to the street.

=== First edition ===
The first edition of the Festival Viva Nebrada was held from 28 July to 1 August 2008. The event, which was organized by Maturén's Ciclorama Producciones Escénicas and the Morella Muñoz Foundation (led by Gunilla Álvarez), culminated with two galas in the Aula Magna of the Central University of Venezuela, with the participation of prominent Venezuelan and foreign dancers and the Orquesta Sinfónica Simón Bolívar, conducted by Maturén's then-husband Maestro Gustavo Dudamel.

=== Second edition ===
The second edition of the Festival was held from 7 to 25 July 2010, and was entitled "Vive la danza". The theme of this edition was more urban, taking the different points of the city of Caracas with several dance groups and different styles, ranging from hip-hop through flamenco, and even contemporary dance. It ended with two dance galas at the Teresa Carreño Theater, where four dance schools from Venezuela participated with works by four choreographers, and the Orquesta Sinfónica de la Juventud Venezolana Simón Bolívar, conducted by Gustavo Dudamel.

=== Third edition ===
The third edition of the Festival was held from 24 to 30 June 2013, and was titled "Festival Vive la Danza". Its shows were held in five plazas emblematic of the city of Caracas, and featured work by 27 choreographers who work in the capital.
