= Liz in September =

- Theatrical release poster
- Original title: Liz en Septiembre
- Directed by: Fina Torres
- Screenplay by: Fina Torres
- Based on: Last Summer at Bluefish Cove by Jane Chambers
- Produced by: Fina Torres; Judy Miller; Laura Oramas
- Starring: Patricia Velásquez; Eloísa Maturén; Mimí Lazo; Elba Escobar; Arlette Torres; Danay García; María Luisa Flores; Luis Gerónimo Abreu
- Cinematography: Celiana Cárdenas; Rodrigo Pulpeiro; Gerard Uzcategui
- Edited by: Aleshka Ferrero
- Distributed by: Cinema Management Group
- Release date: 3 October 2014 (Venezuela)
- Running time: 92 mins
- Country: Venezuela
- Languages: Spanish, English subtitles

Liz in September (Spanish: Liz en Septiembre) is a 2014 Venezuelan romance drama film directed by Fina Torres. The screenplay is an adaptation of the American play Last Summer at Bluefish Cove by Jane Chambers. A work-in-progress project of Liz en Septiembre (Liz in September) screened at the 2013 Miami International Film Festival, followed by the theatrical premiere in Caracas, Venezuela on 3 October 2014.

During its publicity campaign, the film was marketed as the first Spanish language (Note: As a matter of record, the Spanish-language lesbian comedy My Mother Likes Women (A mi madre le gustan las mujeres), directed by Inés París and Daniela Fejerman, was released in 2002.) lesbian film. Regarding this, actress Patricia Velásquez stated that she and the other crew did not immediately think of the film in this fashion during its initial stages of production, but came to realize its importance to others during the filming process.

== Plot ==
Eva (Eloísa Maturén) is on her way out of town when her car breaks down on the side of the road. She makes it into a small town and when she asks for directions to a hotel, the mechanic points her to Margot's (Elba Escobar) place. Margot owns a small hotel and every year some of her friends come to celebrate Liz's (Patricia Velásquez) birthday. She usually would not accommodate another guest during this time, but seems to take pity on Eva and lets her stay. Unbeknownst to Eva, Margot and all of her friends at the hotel this week are lesbians. Having just recently lost a young child to cancer and found out her husband may possibly be cheating, she seems to have a lot on her mind when she arrives.

Liz takes a liking to her after Eva sabotages her fishing outing and invites her to dinner with her friends that night. When her friends see her, Liz bets one of them that she can have Eva in her bed within three days. At dinner, Eva discovers that these women all have something in common: they are lesbians. Almost all of them have had or are currently in relationships with one another, and some have kids from previous heterosexual relationships. This seemingly catches Eva by surprise, and it can be assumed that she hasn't had much interaction with homosexual people and has been heterosexual her whole life.

Eva seems to be more open minded than most people to the women's situation. They explain that they reside outside of town in order to escape the wary looks and slander from those in town. As relationships are being formed, an even deeper relationship forms between Eva and Liz. Part of this is because that Liz makes a bet with one of the other women that she can get Eva in bed with her within three days. Although this was Liz's initial motivation for getting close to Eva, it is clear that it slowly becomes replaced with true feelings for her. As they go on different adventures, Liz's secret, one that she has kept from everyone except for Dolores whom she had a very intimate relationship with, is revealed and it takes a toll on everyone involved: her cancer is back. Coincidentally it was the same illness that Tommy, Eva's son, had when he died.

Unfortunately, on the night of Liz's 37th birthday celebration, she collapses and is rushed to the hospital and finds out that she has only a couple of months to live. While trying to cope with her fear of not having left a memorable impact, she spends her time surrounded by her friends.

== Cast ==
- Patricia Velásquez as Liz
- Eloísa Maturén as Eva
- Mimí Lazo as Dolores
- Elba Escobar as Margot
- Arlette Torres as Any
- Danay García as Coqui
- María Luisa Flores as Alex
- Luis Gerónimo Abreu as Carlos

== Release ==
Liz in September premiered in Venezuela on 3 October 2014. Worldwide distribution rights was acquired by Cinema Management Group in November 2014.

The film screened at the Miami Gay & Lesbian Film Festival and the Frameline Film Festival in 2015.

=== Home media ===
The film was released as Liz in September on DVD and as VOD by Wolfe Video on 3 November 2015.

== Reception ==
Variety gave Liz in September a favorable review, commenting that although some of the elements of the play had been changed, the movie would "be a crowd pleaser primarily among lesbian audiences in various formats." The Hollywood Reporter praised the film, writing that "Torres strips away much of the 1980 stage play’s bigger plot points ... for a more streamlined drama about healing, closure and identity." AfterEllen described Liz in September as a "treat" that was "deep, funny, and filled with several great performances". El Nacional was critical of the movie, as they felt that the "story loses power because of the weakness of the script", although it found Torres's attentiveness for the film's aesthetics favorable.

== See also ==
- List of LGBT-related films directed by women
