= Alexander Hall (Princeton University) =

Assembly and concert hall at Princeton University

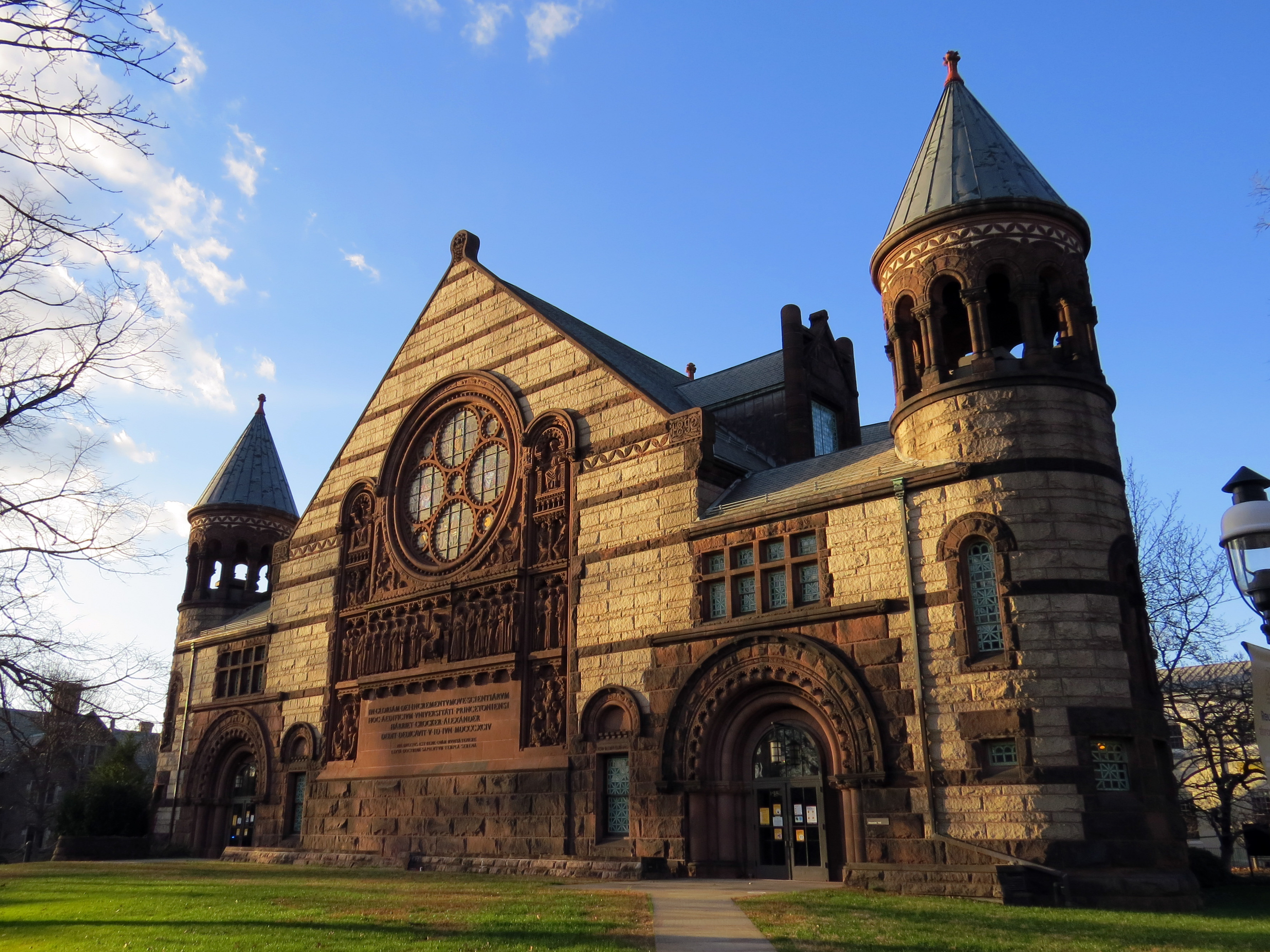
- Alexander Hall at Princeton University
- Interactive map of Alexander Hall
- Full name: Richardson Auditorium in Alexander Hall
- Address: Class of 1975 Walk, Princeton, New Jersey 08544
- Owner: Princeton University
- Capacity: 900
- Type: Concert venue
- Public transit: Princeton Branch (The Dinky)

Construction
- Groundbreaking: 1892
- Opened: 9 June 1894
- Renovated: 1984-85

Website
- princeton.edu/richaud
- Alexander Hall
- U.S. Historic district – Contributing property
- Location within Mercer County, New Jersey Location within New Jersey Location within the United States
- Coordinates: 40°20′54″N 74°39′38.1″W
- Architect: William Appleton Potter
- Part of: Princeton Historic District (ID75001143)
- Added to NRHP: 27 June 1975

Richardson Auditorium in Alexander Hall is a historic 900-seat Richardsonian Romanesque performance hall at Princeton University in Princeton, New Jersey. It is home to both the Princeton University Orchestra and the Princeton Symphony Orchestra.

== History ==
The name of the hall honors three generations of the Alexander family, who all served as University trustees. Funding for the building was sourced from Mrs. Harriet Crocker Alexander, who donated $350,000 ($12.5 million in 2025 dollars) so its name would honor her in-laws: her husband Charles B. Alexander (Class of 1870), his father Henry M. Alexander (Class of 1840), a University trustee and member of the Committee on Commencement Arrangements, and his grandfather Reverend Dr. Archibald Alexander (the Presbyterian founder of the Princeton Theological Seminary and its first professor; honorary Princeton doctorate 1810).

Aerial view of Alexander Hall's rose-window facade, looking north, December 2025

Alexander Hall was designed by architect William Appleton Potter. Construction on the building was completed in 1894, and Alexander Hall held its first annual Commencement ceremony on June 13 of that year. After the Marquand Chapel caught fire, Protestant chapel services were held in the hall.

Although Alexander Hall initially functioned as a space for hosting private University affairs — including commencement, faculty meetings, and popular talks — the space was renovated and expanded into a professional-class performance hall in the 1980s following a large donation from David Richardson (Class of 1966) and growing needs on campus for a proper performing space. In 1984, the auditorium within Alexander Hall was officially renamed to Richardson Auditorium.

Following its renovation in the 1980s, the hall now has an elevator-mounted orchestra pit, sound reflectors for improved acoustics, humidity-controlled instrument storage, and a Tiffany Glass mosaic named "Homeric Story". Today, the building's turrets, rusticated brownstone, and red granite-walls frequently host concerts featuring ensembles and musicians, including conductor Gustavo Dudamel in 2018 and 2019.

Until 2017, when construction on Princeton University's new $330 million performing-arts center was completed, the Princeton University Orchestra rehearsed in the hall thrice per week during the academic year. Following the opening of the Lewis Center Arts, the orchestra now holds its rehearsals in the 3,500 square-foot Lee Rehearsal Room (built for the ensemble) and moves to Richardson Auditorium on the week of the concert.

Beyond music, the hall maintains a strong bond with the local community as a regular venue for town meetings, and it still occasionally serves as a venue for large student events, famous guest speakers, as well as for other various University affairs.

== Gallery ==
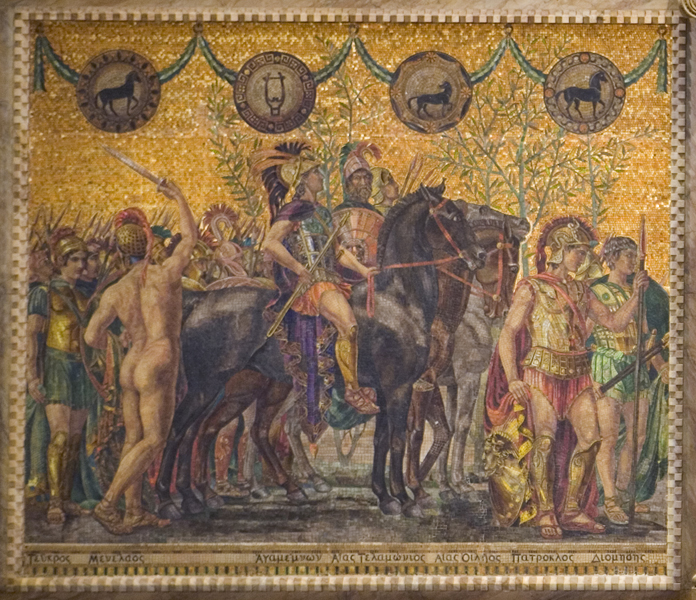
Detail of the left portion of the mosaic by Jacob Adolphus Holzer, which features Greek heroes preparing for war.

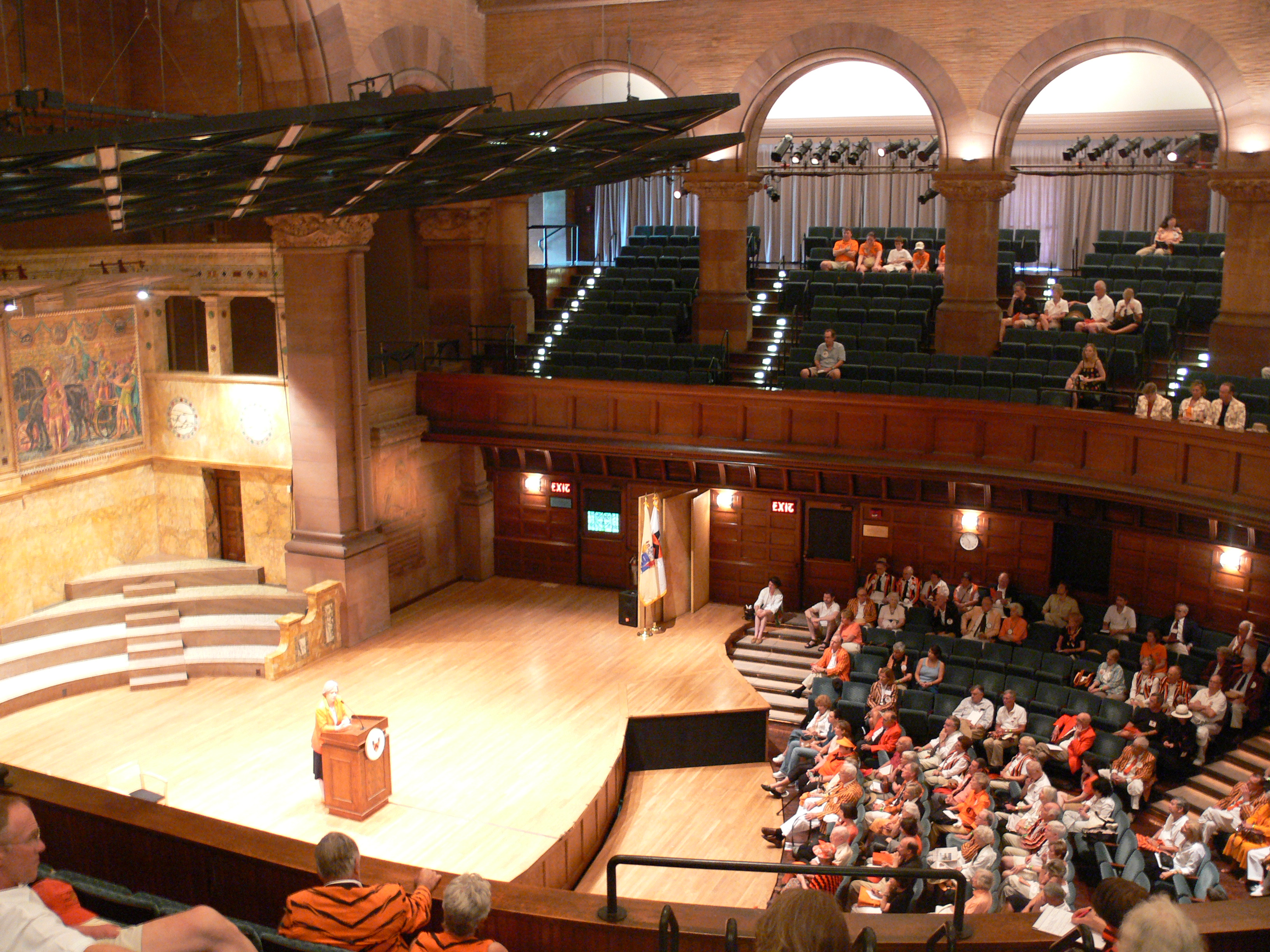
Richardson auditorium during a speech by Shirley Tilghman

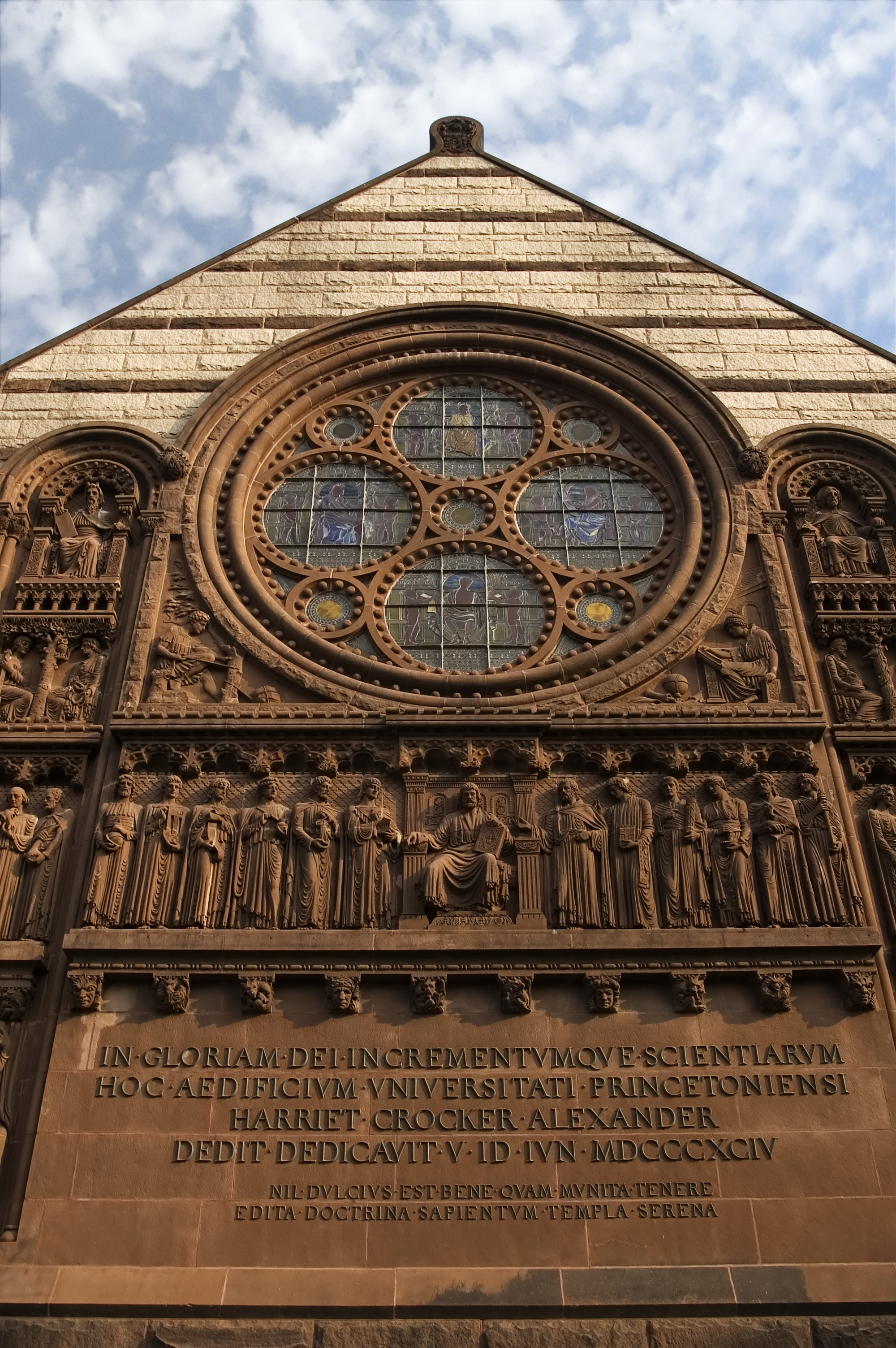
Detail of facade with dedication by Harriet Crocker Alexander

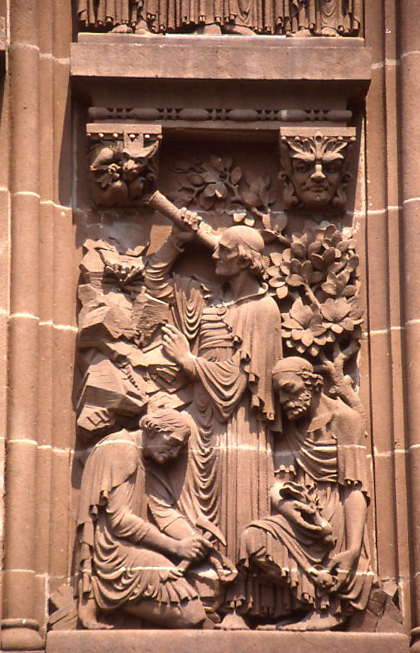
Detail of the sculpture on the facade by J. Massey Rhind
