= SBSO =

SBSO may refer to:

- Santa Barbara County Sheriff's Office
- Simón Bolívar Symphony Orchestra
