= PUO =

PUO may refer to:

- Ksingmul language, by ISO-639 code
- Princeton University Orchestra
- Purley Oaks railway station, by National Rail station code
- Pyrexia or fever of unknown origin

== See also ==
- può is the Italian word for "he/she/it can", and it occurs in the title of books, films and songs.
