= Fina Torres =

Venezuelan film director

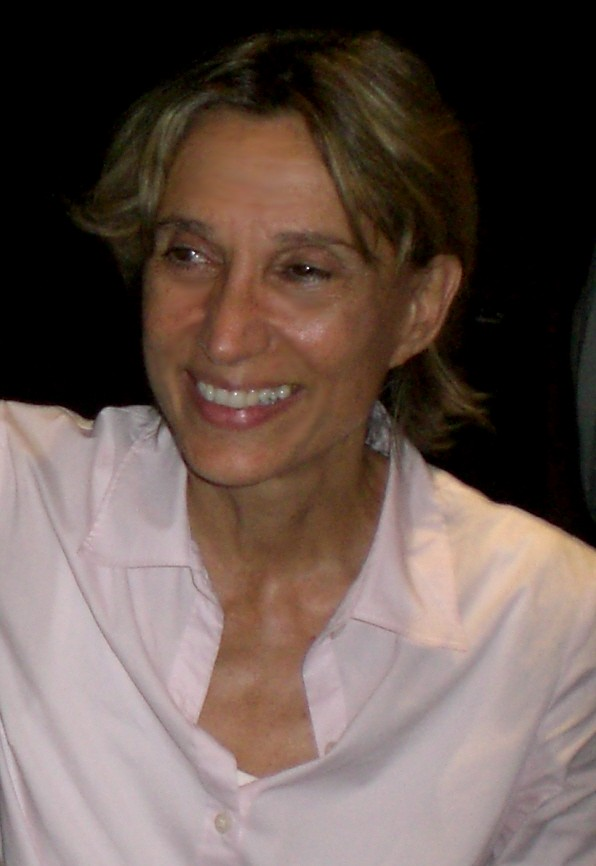
- Born: October 9, 1951 (age 74)
- Occupations: Film director, screenwriter
- Notable work: Oriana, Woman on Top

Fina Torres (born Josefina Torres Benedetti; October 9, 1951) is a Venezuelan film director and screenwriter. She became internationally recognized after winning the la Caméra d'Or award at the 1985 Cannes Film Festival with her directorial debut film, Oriana.

She may be best known for Oriana, Celestial Clockwork and Fox Searchlight Woman on Top with Penélope Cruz. She lives in Venezuela.

== Background ==
Fina Torres was born in Caracas. She studied design, photography, and journalism. At the age of 17, she became a photojournalist. She enrolled at the Neumann institute for Design in 1970 as a graphics design student and also took social communication at Andrés Bello Catholic University.

In 1974, she moved to Paris where she earned a bachelor's degree in cinematography, direction and editing from the Institut des hautes études cinématographiques. She spent the next 28 years of her life in the film industry. After Paris, she lived in the United States, Mexico, Singapore, and eventually returned to Venezuela.

== Career ==
During her time in France, Torres worked as a photographer, camera operator, editor, and film script supervisor. In 1983, she co-wrote a script with Antoine Lacomblez, for which she secured production funds from both Venezuela's state funding agency, FONCINE (Fondo de Fomento Cinematográfico de Venezuela) and the Secretary of Foreign Affairs of France. The result was Torres' first film, Oriana, for which she won the Caméra d'Or award at the Cannes Film Festival. It was described by critic Vincent Camby in The New York Times as a "gothic romance".

In 1996, Torres' second film Celestial Clockwork, was released during the Toronto International Film Festival and Sundance Film Festival. Roger Ebert's review, August 16, 1996: "Celestial Clockwork is a riotous carnival of music, colors, witchery, sexuality and magic. If Almodóvar had made this movie, it would have been hailed as his best work in years."

In 2000, Torres directed Woman on Top (Fox Searchlight production) with Penélope Cruz. The film made the official selection of the Cannes Film Festival in 2000. Variety critic Lisa Nesselson July 26, 2000 wrote "A fantastical romp with a buoyant pace, exotic locations, a finger-popping score, appealing leads and spicy cooking demonstrations." "A contempo fairy tale about thwarted romance, the pic never falters in its adherence to its own bubbly, consistently inventive rhythm."

In 2010, Torres won the best feature film prize at the Los Angeles Latino International Film Festival with her film Habana Eva. The film also won the Best Venezuelan Film prize at the Margarita Film Festival in Venezuela.

In 2011, she co-wrote the romantic comedy From Prada to Nada, based on Sense and Sensibility by Jane Austen. In 2014, she directed Liz in September, an adaptation of the American play Last Summer at Bluefish Cove.

She is a member of the Writers Guild of America and the Société des Auteurs et Compositeurs Dramatiques (SACD) of France.

== Social advocacy ==
In 1995 Torres was identified as part of a new movement in Latin American cinema focusing less on films with political themes as had been the norm, and more on universal themes like relationships and conflicts between traditional culture and modernity. Torres' films in particular, focus on strong female characters who defy patriarchal norms.

In an interview with GLAAD in 2015, she expressed a desire to help young gay and lesbian people through her film Liz in September. The film was an adaptation of Last Summer at Bluefish Cove, a play known as part of the first wave of American gay theater and centers on LGBT themes. The film has a focus on lesbian characters and issues and stars Venezuelan actress and model Patricia Velásquez, who is a lesbian.

== Awards ==
- For the film Oriana:
  - May 1985: Caméra d'Or (Golden Camera) during the Cannes Festival, sélection officielle "Un certain regard"
  - 1985: Bronze Hugo, Chicago International film Festival
  - 1985: Catalina de Oro (Golden Catalina) for best film, Cartagena International film Festival
  - 1985: Catalina de Oro (Golden Catalina) for best script, Cartagena International film Festival
  - Glauber Rocha's award for Best Spanish language film, Figueira da Foz International Film Festival
  - August 1985: Revista Mujeres' award during the Figueira da Foz International Film Festival
  - Honour Mencion of the Catholic Office-Figueira da Foz International Film Festival
  - 1985: Honour Mencion of the Jury and honour mention of the Catholic Office, MANHEIM Film Festival
  - 1986: National Awards (premios municipales de Caracas) for best film, best director, best photography, best actress
  - Ateneo de Caracas award
- For the film Celestial Clockwork:
  - 1995: Prix du public during the Namur Film Festival
  - 1996: Grand Jury Award for outstanding narrative feature, Outfest Los Angeles Festival
  - 1996: Anac National Award for best Venezuelan film
  - 1996: Special award during the Washington Film Festival
- For the film Women On Top:
  - 2000: Sélection officielle "Un Certain Regard" during the Cannes Film Festival
  - 2001: Nominated for best director during the Alma Awards
- For the film Habana Eva:
  - 2010: Best film during the New York International Latino Film Fest
  - 2010: 2nd audience award during the Los Angeles International Latino Film Fest
  - 2010: Best film audience award during the Amazonia International Film Fest (Brazil)
  - 2010: Best film during the International Latino Margarita Film Fest
  - 2010: Best supporting actress during the Mérida International Film Fest
  - 2010: Best actress during the Cines Unidos Award
  - 2011: Mesquite award for best film San Antonio Film Fest
  - Best actress during the Prakriti Maduro Punta Del Este Film Fest (Uruguay)
- For the film Liz in September:
  - Audience Award for best women's feature at Atlanta's Out On Film LGBT Film Festival
  - Audience Award for best feature at the SouthWest Gay and Lesbian Film Festival
  - 2015: Best feature during Atlanta's Out On Film
  - 2015: Best women's feature Festival Les Gais Cine Mad (España)
  - 2015: Audience Award 2015 during the Festival Sant Andreu de la Barca
  - 2015: Best Foreign Film during the Out Film CT: Connecticut Gay & Lesbian Film Festival
  - Best Feature Audience Award during the Miami Gay & Lesbian Film Festival

== Filmography ==
- Oriana (1985)
- Celestial Clockwork (1996)
- Woman on Top (2000)
- Habana Eva (2008)
- Liz in September (2014)

== See also ==
- List of female film and television directors
- List of LGBT-related films directed by women
