= Woman on Top =

- Theatrical release poster
- Directed by: Fina Torres
- Written by: Vera Blasi
- Produced by: Alan Poul
- Starring: Penélope Cruz; Murilo Benício; Harold Perrineau Jr.; Mark Feuerstein; Wagner Moura
- Cinematography: Thierry Arbogast
- Edited by: Leslie Jones
- Music by: Luis Bacalov
- Distributed by: Fox Searchlight Pictures
- Release dates: May 2000 (Cannes); June 24, 2000 (Munich); September 22, 2000 (United States)
- Running time: 91 minutes
- Country: United States
- Languages: English; Portuguese
- Budget: $8 million
- Box office: $10.2 million

Woman on Top is a 2000 American supernatural fantasy romantic comedy film directed by Fina Torres, written by Vera Blasi, and starring Penélope Cruz, Murilo Benício, Harold Perrineau Jr., and Mark Feuerstein.

Chef Isabella Oliveira leaves her husband Toninho in Brazil to try to start over at her friend Monica's in San Francisco, as he committed adultery and doesn't listen to her needs. She gets her own cooking show, then he follows to win her back.

The film was released in the United States on September 22, 2000.

== Plot ==
Isabella has suffered from motion sickness all her life. Because of her illness, she could not play much with other children. She stayed at home where her mother taught her to cook, growing up to become a renowned chef. She fell in love with Toninho and they opened a restaurant together, with Isabella stuck in the kitchen and Toninho out front taking the credit.

The only way for Isabella to control her motion sickness is to control her motion. She must drive rather than ride in a car, take stairs instead of elevators, lead while dancing, and be on top during coitus. Toninho, feeling emasculated and resentful of this, has an affair with a neighbor, which Isabella witnesses first-hand; it is the last straw. Having had enough, Isabella prays to Yemanjá, the Afro-Brazilian Queen of the Ocean, to harden her heart against Toninho. Despite her motion sickness, Isabella flies from Brazil to San Francisco to stay with her Afro-Brazilian transsexual friend Monica, who spent her early years with her in the fishing community of Salvador.

Having previously received job offers from several prestigious restaurants, Isabella tries, but is unable to find a position as chef, and eventually settles for teaching a cooking class at a local culinary school. However, on her first day, she finds herself haunted by the memory of her love for Toninho, cutting her finger while distracted. Monica helps Isabella cast a spell with instructions from Vodou priestess Serafina, who warns "there's no looking back. Yemanjá will take your love to the bottom of the sea." The next morning, she is finally able to remove her wedding ring. Cliff, a neighbor and KCDF Television producer, smells her cooking, follows her to class, and signs her to host a cooking show, Passion Food Live. She makes Monica her assistant on the show, and it becomes an instant hit, making her a local television star.

Back in Brazil, Toninho's restaurant is floundering without Isabella. Toninho curses Yemanjá, after which, fishermen are no longer catching any fish. He discovers she has gone to Monica's and follows her to San Francisco. He spots her on television and tracks her to the studio. With a group of local street musicians, Toninho sneaks into the studio and onto the set, serenading Isabella on the live broadcast. Impressed by their chemistry, Cliff's boss Alex Reeves hires Toninho and the musicians over Isabella's objections, insisting she will be fired if she does not work with Toninho. She tries to pursue a relationship with Cliff, but Toninho continually tries to win her back.

Network executives offer to syndicate Isabella's show nationally, but only after demanding a number of changes. With his restaurant closed and up for sale, Toninho apologizes to Yemanjá but tells her to "stay out of [his] business" with Isabella. He quits the show. Isabella also quits rather than accept changes demanded by the network, such as wearing a "Vanna White" dress, cooking with Tabasco sauce, and most of all, firing Monica.

Toninho makes another attempt to win Isabella back at her apartment, serenading her from the street. Isabella tosses him a white rose, and thunder claps, worrying Monica, "Oh, boy. Love versus voodoo." Toninho tries kissing Isabella, who believes "Now is too late." He asks, "Isabella, what happened to you," and leaves. Isabella goes after him, but forced to take the elevator, her motion sickness delays her long enough to allow Toninho to depart.

Isabella, wanting her love returned, tries to cook another sacrifice for Yemanjá to undo the spell, but finds her talent faded; her soufflé falls flat, and Monica suggests incorporating boxed macaroni and cheese. Isabella makes a second offering but nearly drowns. She has a vision of Yemanjá, in which she swims down to touch her first offering, then awakens on the beach

Isabella collects her belongings from the television studio. Toninho, sent by Monica, shows up and suggests they cook something together, "for old times' sake." After they roast a banana leaf-wrapped fish, the fish return to the village waters and Yemanjá returns Isabella's love for Toninho.

Later, Toninho and Isabella, as equal partners, operate a new restaurant on the beach where Cliff and Monica dance.

== Cast ==
- Penélope Cruz as Isabella Oliveira
  - Analu De Castro as 2-year-old Isabella
  - Thais De Sá Curvelo as 5-year-old Isabella
- Murilo Benício as Toninho Oliveira
- Harold Perrineau Jr. as Monica Jones
- Mark Feuerstein as Cliff Lloyd
- John De Lancie as Alex Reeves
- Anne Ramsay as TV director
- Ana Gasteyer as Claudia Hunter
- Eliana Guttman as Isabella's mother
- Eduardo Mattedi as Isabella's father
- Wagner Moura as Rafi

== Production ==
The film was shot on location in Salvador, Brazil, and San Francisco, United States. Drag queen RuPaul read multiple times for the part of Monica Jones, which eventually went to Perrineau Jr.

== Release ==
The film premiered in the Un Certain Regard section at the 2000 Cannes Film Festival and screened at the Munich International Film Festival on June 24, 2000, before receiving a North American theatrical release by Fox Searchlight Pictures on September 22, 2000.

=== Critical response ===
Woman on Top received mixed reviews from critics. Metacritic reports a 41 out of 100 ratings, based on 31 critics, indicating "mixed or average reviews". On Rotten Tomatoes, the film holds a 35% score based on 100 reviews, with an average rating of 4.7/10. The site's consensus: "Despite Penelope Cruz's beauty and charm, the movie is too tepid to be a romance and too silly to be believable. And the movie is too eager to please with an ending that seems more like a cop-out."

Audiences polled by CinemaScore gave the film an average grade of "C" on an A+ to F scale.

=== Box office ===
The film opened at #10 at the North American box office, earning $2,008,191 in its opening weekend. Ultimately, the film grossed $5,020,111 in North America playing at a high of 1,086 theaters; overseas, it grossed $5,174,163 for a worldwide total of $10,194,274, becoming a modest box office success against an $8 million budget.
