= María Luisa Flores =

Venezuelan actress and model

- Born: María Luisa Flores García; October 12, 1979 (age 45); Caracas, Distrito Capital, Venezuela
- Occupation(s): Actress, model
- Years active: 2010-present

María Luisa Flores (born October 12, 1979, Caracas, Distrito Capital, Venezuela), is a Venezuelan actress and model.

== Filmography ==
Film
Year	Title	Role	Notes
2013	Liz en Septiembre	Alex	Debut film
Television
Year	Title	Role	Notes
2010	Clase ejecutiva	Daniela Méndez	TV series
2010	Doña Bella	Inés Segovia	Supporting role
2011	Popland!	Carla Romano	2 episodes
2011	Primera dama	Paula Méndez	Supporting role
2013	Mentiras perfectas	Adriana	Supporting role
2014	Reina de corazones	Constanza "Connie" Leiva	Co-protagonist
2015	Dueños del paraíso	Paola Quezada	Co-antagonist
