= Saint Bernard (film) =

- Spanish: San Bernardo
- Directed by: Joan Potau
- Screenplay by: Joan Potau
- Produced by: César Benítez
- Starring: Alberto San Juan; Patricia Velásquez; Ana Risueño; Lina Mira; Balbina del Rosario
- Cinematography: Javier G. Salmones
- Edited by: Ernesto Blasi
- Music by: Francisco Ruiz Musulen; Luis Elices Fe
- Production company: Cristal Producciones
- Distributed by: Columbia TriStar Films de España
- Release dates: 3 June 2000 (Málaga); 25 August 2000 (Spain)
- Country: Spain
- Language: Spanish

Saint Bernard (Spanish: San Bernardo) is a 2000 Spanish comedy film written and directed by Joan Potau starring Alberto San Juan.

== Plot ==
Do-gooder Miguel dates crippled woman Fina, unattractive woman Gloria, and overweight woman Dori out of compassion, but decides to kill all three after meeting French beauty Claudia.

== Cast ==
- Alberto San Juan as Miguel
- Ana Risueño as Fina
- Lina Mira as Dori
- Balbina del Rosario as Gloria
- Patricia Velásquez as Claudia
- María Vázquez

== Production ==
The film was produced by Cristal Producciones and it had the association of Tele 5.

== Release ==
The film premiered at the 3rd Málaga Film Festival in June 2000. Distributed by Columbia TriStar Films de España, it was released theatrically in Spain on 25 August 2000. Sales company Kevin Williams Associates (KWA) sold pay-TV rights to the film to HBO USA.

== Reception ==
Jonathan Holland of Variety assessed that, despite being made watchable by a decent performance by San Juan, the film "is otherwise a deeply sexist and implausible farrago of bad jokes and desperately poor taste".

== See also ==
- List of Spanish films of 2000
