= Oriana (film) =

- Film poster
- Directed by: Fina Torres
- Written by: Antoine Lacomblez; Fina Torres
- Produced by: Patrick Sandrin; Fina Torres
- Starring: Doris Wells
- Cinematography: Jean-Claude Larrieu
- Edited by: Christiane Lack
- Release date: 14 September 1985
- Running time: 88 minutes
- Country: Venezuela
- Language: Spanish

Oriana is a 1985 Venezuelan film directed by Fina Torres and written by Antoine Lacomblez and Torres herself. Set in a hacienda (or ranch), this drama tells the story of Maria, a woman who returns to the house where she spent a short time as a girl to discover some secrets about her aunt, the title character, who died and left the property to her.

The film won the Caméra d'Or Prize at the 1985 Cannes Film Festival as the best first feature. It was Fina Torres first feature film and won many awards at the time. It was selected as the Venezuelan entry for the Best Foreign Language Film at the 58th Academy Awards, but was not accepted as a nominee.

== Plot ==
Maria, a Venezuelan woman returns to Venezuela from France when she learns that her aunt Oriana has died and willed her a crumbling and remote Venezuelan hacienda where Maria spent a short time as a girl just entering puberty. Maria goes to the hacienda, a fine, decaying old house in a tropical jungle at the edge of the sea, to prepare the place for sale; while visiting the house, Maria starts wandering through the halls and rooms and she begin to remember her visit years before. While going through her aunt's papers, she also start to find some clues to her aunt's behaviour. Maria is haunted by flashbacks to her childhood, when she spent several months at the hacienda in the company of only the beautiful and mysterious Oriana and Fidelia, a quarrelsome old retainer who constantly hints at terrible events that are best forgotten. In flashbacks, the film show the young Maria trying to understand the quiet but strange atmosphere that surrounds the place while sorting out why Oriana never leaves the hacienda and what secret may be in Oriana's past.

The young Maria, as she learns things, imagines her aunt's youth, cruel father, and first love. After these reveries within reveries, Maria, now a grown woman, eventually makes one more discovery by connecting some issues, finding evidence that someone never seen may also be living in the vicinity. After that, Maria decides not to sell the house.

== Production ==
The film was produced by Arion Productions and Pandora Films and was based on the story Oriane, Aunt Oriane published by Colombian writer Marvel Moreno.

== Cast ==
- Doris Wells – Oriana
- Daniela Silverio – Adult Maria
- Maya Oloe – Maria, adolescent
- Mirtha Borges – Fidelia
- Rafael Briceño – Padre
- Philippe Rouleau – George
- Claudia Venturini – Oriana, adolescent
- Hannah Caminos – Oriana, child

== Distribution ==
The film was limited released in 1985, but gained popular attention after its victory at the Cannes Film Festival. As for 2006, Facets Multimedia Distribution is the official distributor of the film in the USA for all media.

== Reception ==
The film is generally referred to as a Venezuelan gothic love story, probably for the elements of the storyline but also for the narrative used on it and the camera work that creates a dark atmosphere through it. The film was first showed in the Toronto Film Festival on 14 September 1985. Later, it was presented in the New York Film Festival where it received a general warm and positive review. Nonetheless, there were critics that did not find the film quite likeable and complained about the slow rhythm and the structure of it, that is at some point hard to follow. The New York Times, considered the film "a pretty movie but not a very engaging one".

== Awards ==
The film won the Camera D'Or in the 1985 Cannes Film Festival. It also won Best Film and Best Screenplay in the Cartagena Film Festival. Other awards include Best Film in the Chicago International Film Festival.

== See also ==
- List of submissions to the 58th Academy Awards for Best Foreign Language Film
- List of Venezuelan submissions for the Academy Award for Best Foreign Language Film
