= Princeton Symphony Orchestra =

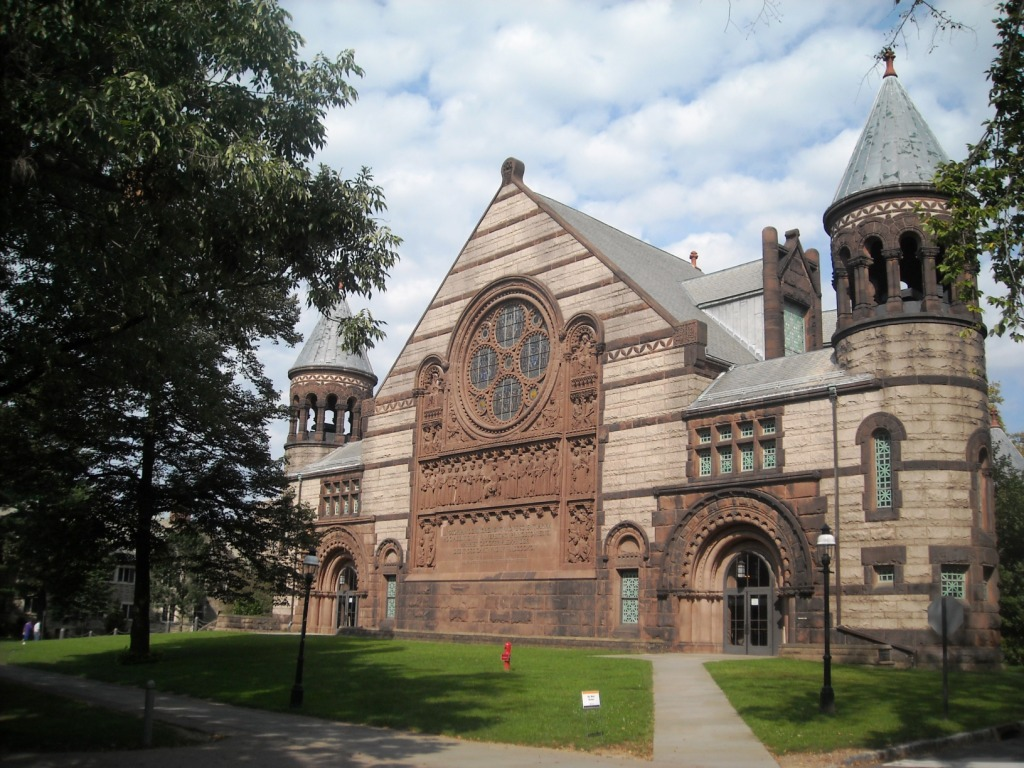
Alexander Hall at Princeton University, home to performances of the Princeton Symphony Orchestra.

The Princeton Symphony Orchestra (locally known as the PSO) is a professional U.S. orchestra based in Princeton, New Jersey. Rossen Milanov has been music director since 2009, leading the orchestra in critically acclaimed performances. All orchestra concerts take place at the 900-seat Richardson Auditorium, a historic concert hall located on the campus of Princeton University.

== History ==
The Princeton Symphony Orchestra was founded in 1980 by Portia Sonnenfeld (at the time also the director of the orchestra program at Princeton High School) and was originally a chamber ensemble known as the Little Orchestra of New Jersey. Sonnenfeld's vision was supported by a dedicated board of trustees, including composer and philanthropist Edward T. Cone.

After Sonnenfeld's death in 1986, Mark Laycock was appointed music director. During Laycock's 22-year tenure, the ensemble grew into a fully professional symphony orchestra and saw significant artistic growth. In 2009, after an extensive two-year search, the PSO appointed high-profile conductor Rossen Milanov as its third music director. Today, the orchestra attracts large and diverse audiences from New Jersey, New York, and Pennsylvania.

== Performances ==
The orchestra performs six Classical Series concerts, two PSO POPS! concerts, and four Chamber Series concerts each season. The orchestra season runs September through May.

The PSO’s Classical Series concerts feature both classical masterworks and new music by living composers. The orchestra has been praised for offering "a model of what a new music premiere should be." Past and upcoming Classical Series guest artists of particular note include violinists Leila Josefowicz, Jennifer Koh, and Lara St. John; cellist Joshua Roman; flutist Eugenia Zukerman; clarinetist David Krakauer; and pianist Anthony Hewitt. The PSO has also collaborated on concerts with the acclaimed choirs of Westminster Choir College.

PSO POPS! concerts include a December holiday concert and a Broadway concert. Notable singers who have joined the orchestra for Broadway pops programs include Barbara Cook, Norm Lewis, and Brent Barrett.

The PSO’s Chamber Series programs are designed to complement the themes explored in Classical Series concerts, presenting chamber music at the Institute for Advanced Study in Princeton and at two local retirement communities.

== Community outreach ==
The Princeton Symphony Orchestra has a stated mission to build understanding and appreciation of classical music in the Princeton community. To this end, the orchestra presents numerous concerts and other events free of charge, including Chamber Series concerts, lectures in collaboration with the Princeton Public Library, and lectures on new music by living composers. The PSO also collaborates with the Princeton Adult School to present adult education classes in connection with each Classical Series concert. Some past program notes are available online.

Music education initiatives are a central component of the orchestra's activities. In 1995, the PSO debuted BRAVO!, an education program through which small ensembles of PSO musicians travel to local elementary schools and introduce students to the instruments of the orchestra. PSO BRAVO! has since expanded to include a program for middle school students that explores the connections between music and visual art, and masterclasses for high school and college instrumentalists, taught by PSO guest artists. Every spring, more than 2,000 Central New Jersey elementary school students attend the PSO BRAVO! children's concert. Altogether, PSO BRAVO! serves 10,000 students annually.

== Music directors ==
- Portia Sonnenfeld (1980–1986)
- Mark Laycock (1986–2007)
- Rossen Milanov (2009 – present)
