= Committed (2000 film) =

2000 film directed by Lisa Krueger

- Theatrical release poster
- Directed by: Lisa Krueger
- Written by: Lisa Krueger
- Produced by: Dean Silvers; Marlen Hecht
- Starring: Heather Graham; Casey Affleck; Luke Wilson; Goran Višnjić; Alfonso Arau; Patricia Velásquez
- Cinematography: Tom Krueger
- Edited by: Curtiss Clayton; Colleen Sharp
- Music by: Joey Burns; John Convertino
- Distributed by: Miramax Films
- Release dates: January 21, 2000 (Sundance); April 28, 2000
- Running time: 98 minutes
- Country: United States
- Language: English
- Budget: $3 million
- Box office: $40,361

Committed is a 2000 comedy film directed and written by Lisa Krueger and stars Heather Graham, Casey Affleck, and Luke Wilson.

== Plot ==
Optimistic Joline marries photographer Carl and they live together in a NYC loft. She operates a nightclub and is generally content whereas he is unhappy that he is assigned to photograph food rather than news for his newspaper.

Arriving home to hear Carl's depressed answering message, Joline calls her brother Jay, who lets her stay over. In the morning, she talks about her strong belief in marriage, a perspective not shared with his lesbian roommates.

Upon returning to their loft, Joline discovers Carl has moved out, roughly after 1.5 years of marriage. His note, which mentions he needs space, comes with a bouquet of daisies, her favorite flowers.

After liquefying the daisies in the blender, Joline spends the next few days in a daze. Having her cheery outlook darkened, she goes ahead with a surprise birthday party for Carl. Joline receives a random postcard from him on that day. After presenting the cake to the partygoers, she sneaks out of the bathroom window into the alley. There, upon finding a carjacker, Joline hears his story and gives him money to go to his mother's, thereby restoring her faith.

Judging by the picture and smudged postmark, Joline heads to Texas and finally tracks Carl down. She sees one of his food photos in an El Paso newspaper, and decides to stake it out. Before long, Joline is able to tail him to his mobile home, where she spies on him. She acquaints herself with Carl's schedule and life. His quirky, sculptor neighbor Neil immediately notices her, and incessantly flirts with Joline.

Going into the El Paso Times offices, Joline finds the photo editor. When he says Carl is on a food-related shoot, she gently suggests he rethink his assignments, as his skills are superior to just shooting food. Judging by his reaction, Joline asks him to forget what she said as she fears she may have put Carl's job at risk.

After following Carl, Joline sees him kissing Carmen outside of her house. Falling asleep in her car, Joline wakes to Carmen knocking on her window. Inviting her into the house, the Mexican-American hears that she is dating yet another adulterer. Then her unwelcome ex T-Bo barges in.

Carmen introduces Joline to her Mexican-American, mystic grandfather so he help her with Carl. Jay comes to take her home, but she wants to stay to try to help Carl, so she asks him to let her be.

That evening, Jay and Carmen, who have gotten to know each other, return to watch Joline's stakeout at Carl's. Neil sexually teases Joline by caressing a blowup doll which looks like her in his window. Turned on, Jay and Carmen make out.

T-Bo shows up at Carl's, but Joline stands guard, so the trucker leaves. The next day, the mystic embeds her and a sand with a protection remedy. She then has to sprinkle it throughout his house. Carl finds Joline spreading it, where he blames her for absorbing all of his good luck. He mentions his increase in newsworthy photo assignments as evidence that he is luckier without her, not knowing she helped him. Carl then shows her the door.

Determined to keep a spiritual vigil for Carl, Joline sets up across the road, oblivious to his protests. Jay and Carmen join her, sleeping under the stars. When Carl confronts them, they tell him off. After Joline had broken Carl's window to leave eggs under his bed, Carl warns her before contacting the police. They take her away, and she ends up in a mental hospital. Carmen's grandfather releases Joline, who goes directly to Carl's.

Seeing T-Bo threatening Carl, who's bound and gagged, Joline knocks him out with a bat. She frees Carl, both from his binds and their marriage. Returning to NYC, Joline continues to commit herself to causes. Carl lets himself into her apartment as he is back in the city. Before he can say much, Joline karate-kicks him to the ground, silencing him.

Joline attends Jay and Carmen's El Paso wedding. As the guests are dancing, the camera slowly moves further and further back as narrator Joline talks about leaps of faith...pointing out they can be seen as stupid or brave, crazy or very lucky.

== Cast ==
- Heather Graham as Joline (nicknamed Jo)
- Casey Affleck as Jay
- Luke Wilson as Carl
- Goran Višnjić as Neil
- Patricia Velásquez as Carmen
- Alfonso Arau as Grampy
- Mark Ruffalo as T-Bo
- Clea DuVall as Mimi
- Kim Dickens as Jenny
- Summer Phoenix as Meg
- Art Alexakis as NY Car Thief
- Mary Kay Place as Psychiatrist
- Dylan Baker as Terry
- Wood Harris as Chicky
- Jon Stewart as birthday party guest (uncredited)

== Reception ==
=== Release ===
Committed premiered at the 2000 Sundance Film Festival, where it was nominated for the Grand Jury Prize and won the award for Best Cinematography. The film had a limited theatrical release on April 28, 2000.

=== Critical response ===
On Rotten Tomatoes, 43% of 46 surveyed critics gave the film a positive review; the average rating is 5.40/10. The site's consensus reads: "Critics say Committed is one of those films that shows promise – some sort of vision – of what the movie could have been. The key word is 'could'. As it is, the script is predictable, the story becomes tedious, and it's simply not funny. Heather Graham shows she can play a central character, but she's not enough to make Committed successful." On Metacritic it has a score of 44% based on reviews from 22 critics, indicating "mixed or average" reviews. Metro Silicon Valley's reviewer, Richard von Busack, criticized the film's "tiresome daffiness" and said it "indulges in the worst intellectual habit of the '60s counterculture—it supports putting a principle ahead of common sense". In his review, A. O. Scott of The New York Times said the film has interesting ideas but fails to explore them. He also criticized the film's uncertain tone.

Committed was nominated for the Golden Reel Award for Best Sound Editing.

== Home media ==
Committed was released on VHS and DVD in 2000. In 2010, the film's producer Miramax was sold by Disney (their owners since 1993), with Qatari company beIN Media Group subsequently taking over the studio. In April 2020, ViacomCBS (now known as Paramount Skydance) acquired the rights to Miramax's film library, after buying a 49% stake in the studio from beIN. Paramount Home Entertainment reissued Committed on DVD on July 27, 2021, with Paramount also reissuing many other Miramax titles around this time.
