= 12 Days of Christmas Eve =

- Magazine promotional advertisement
- Directed by: Martha Coolidge
- Screenplay by: J.B. White
- Story by: Jean Abounader; J.B. White
- Produced by: Craig McNeil
- Starring: Steven Weber; Molly Shannon
- Cinematography: Derick Underschultz
- Edited by: Steven Cohen
- Music by: Jennie Muskett
- Production company: Granada America
- Distributed by: First Look Media (US, DVD)
- Release date: December 7, 2004 (US)
- Running time: 90 minutes
- Country: United States
- Language: English

12 Days of Christmas Eve is a 2004 American–Canadian made‑for‑television film starring Steven Weber and Molly Shannon. It premiered on the USA Network on December 7, 2004, and received mixed reviews, with frequent comparisons to Groundhog Day and Charles Dickens's A Christmas Carol. The story follows a businessman who prioritizes work over family and dies on Christmas Eve, only to be given twelve opportunities to relive the day and amend his mistakes.

== Plot ==
Calvin Carter, a successful retail CEO and divorced father, prioritizes his business at the expense of his family, particularly his son Eric. On Christmas Eve, he concentrates on securing support from a Brazilian representative, Isabel, for a planned Latin American expansion. In an effort to impress her, he replaces his girlfriend, Rhianna, at a lunch reservation she had arranged.

Calvin also requires his associates to work through Christmas Eve, causing them to miss the holiday. He continues to skip important family events, including the Christmas Eve party at his brother Jesse's house, which the rest of his family attends. That evening, Isabel tells him she will give his business plan "very serious consideration", which Calvin interprets as a victory and celebrates. As he leaves the building, a large mechanical finger sign falls and crushes him. He then encounters a woman named Angie, who appears to be a nurse, unaware that he is in a form of limbo or of her true identity.

The next morning, Calvin awakens to find that Christmas Eve has reset. In an effort to win Isabel's approval, he repeats her earlier remarks and presents himself as she had expected during the previous version of the day. He also attends Eric's choir concert, doing so primarily to impress her. In the third iteration, Calvin allows Isabel to dominate their conversations, which unsettles him and jeopardizes his expansion plans. In both attempts, he is still unable to avoid his death.

Back in the limbo, Angie explains that Calvin has twelve total attempts to relive Christmas Eve, with nine remaining after his first three failures. In the next two iterations, he makes gestures that appear generous but are ultimately self‑serving, pleasing the public while alienating his family. In the sixth attempt, he gives his relatives expensive gifts, which they reject despite Eric's excitement over one of them.

In the seventh attempt, Calvin tries to impress Isabel by taking over his aging father Hank's role of handing out the remaining candy canes at the company's original store, angering both Hank and Jesse. He also brings Eric along on a business tour with Isabel and later drops him off at the Christmas Eve party, which he again chooses not to attend, disappointing Eric. Back in the limbo, Calvin tells Angie that he once missed the chance to visit his dying mother because he was working. In the eighth attempt, he stages an elaborate feast and redecorates Jesse's house, leading Jesse to expel him.

In the ninth attempt, seeking to act solely for himself, Calvin purchases expensive cars and spends his time exclusively with Rhianna. Distressed by his repeated deaths, he tries unsuccessfully to escape the limbo, prompting Angie to intervene. In the tenth attempt, he proposes to Rhianna, but she declines, citing his divorce and shortcomings as a father. Overcome with despair, he takes his own life. In the eleventh attempt, he quietly volunteers at a soup kitchen. Across these three iterations, he avoids both work and family gatherings entirely.

Back in the limbo, when Calvin expresses a desire to give up, Angie reprimands him for prioritizing business throughout his attempts and describes him as an "uncrackable" case. In the twelfth and final iteration, Calvin grants his associates time off for the holidays and gives them Christmas bonuses. He also sends Isabel to the airport early for her flight home. During lunch, he ends his relationship with Rhianna, telling her she deserves someone who shares her desire to start a family. He then attends Eric's concert and spends additional time with him.

At Jesse's Christmas Eve party, Calvin compliments Jesse, speaks with his ex‑wife Marilyn about Eric, and reflects on his late mother with Hank. He later collapses from heartburn and is taken to a hospital. When he wakes the next morning, a nurse informs him that it is Christmas Day, which he greets with relief. Angie soon reappears, telling him that the "best Christmas Eve thing" is not a destination but a journey, before vanishing again. Back at Jesse's house, Calvin joins a family snowball fight. Meanwhile, Isabel leaves him a voicemail thanking him for sending her home early, which allowed her to spend Christmas with her family, and adds, "Off the record, welcome to Latin America."

== Cast ==
- Steven Weber as Calvin Carter, CEO of The Buck Stops Here, a discount store chain company
- Patricia Velasquez as Isabel Freyas, vice president of International Markets, who arrived from São Paulo
- Chad Willett as Jesse Carter, Calvin's brother
- Sonia Donaldson as Sarah, Jesse's wife
- Ben Wheelwright as Jesse's Son
- Cross Dodocicz as Jesse's Daughter
- Teryl Rothery as Marilyn, Calvin's ex-wife
- Vincent Gale as Drew Quinn, Calvin's executive assistant
- Stefanie von Pfetten as Rhianna, Calvin's partner
- Antony Holland as Hank Carter, Calvin and Jesse's father
- Molly Shannon as Angie, an angel/nurse
- Kade Philps as Eric Carter, Calvin's son
- Olivia Cheng as Jenna Lee, a television news reporter

== Production ==
Filming took place in Edmonton and Calgary, Canada, from late September or early October 2004 until October 23, 2004.

== Release ==
The film premiered on the USA Network in the United States on December 7, 2004, at 8:00 p.m. Eastern / 7:00 p.m. Central, and aired on the Access channel in Edmonton later that month. It was released on DVD and VHS in the United States on November 15, 2005.

== Reception ==
Justin Neal of the Minneapolis Star Tribune and Matthew Gilbert of The Boston Globe compared the film to Groundhog Day, noting its similar time‑loop premise. Neal described the film as "an obvious rip of Groundhog Day but without Chris Elliott." Gilbert criticized the film for lacking "any surprises or incidental comedic flourishes" as well as "enough character development" and originality. Nevertheless, Gilbert praised the scenes featuring Weber and Shannon together, despite noting that she appears in "only a handful of scenes, a most Scrooge‑like decision by director Martha Coolidge".

David Kronke of the Los Angeles Daily News and Robert Bianco of USA Today described the film as a blend of Charles Dickens's A Christmas Carol and Groundhog Day. Kronke criticized it as "pretty uninspired". Bianco described the blend of A Christmas Carol and Groundhog Day as "pretty if mediocre". He praised Steven Weber's comic performance, particularly "his struggles and his deaths," but felt the character's story was "so slow" that it was easy "to lose interest in his reformation." Nevertheless, he added, "[W]hen the big moment comes, odds are you'll find yourself smiling along."

Mike Hughes of the Lansing State Journal called the film "fun", praising "Martha Coolidge's sharp direction" and the scenes featuring Molly Shannon. Anne Sherber of Home Media Retailing praised the film as "a charming title that works on different levels" and "less saccharine tha[n] many other Christmas titles." She added that its "obvious homage to Groundhog Day, which has become something of a cult classic, will also increase its appeal." The Advertiser (Adelaide, South Australia) rated the film one star ("minor interest") out of four. Charlie McCollum of The Mercury News wrote that "only Shannon—as Weber's guardian angel—rises above the dreary script and bad production."

== See also ==
- List of films featuring time loops
