= Celestial Clockwork (film) =

- Theatrical release poster
- French: Mécaniques célestes
- Directed by: Fina Torres
- Written by: Fina Torres
- Starring: Ariadna Gil; Arielle Dombasle; Evelyne Didi
- Cinematography: Ricardo Aronovich
- Edited by: Christiane Lack; Catherine Trouillet
- Music by: Alma Rosa Castellanos; François Farrugia; Michel Musseau
- Production companies: Miralta Films; Mistral Films; Pandorados C.A.; Paradise Films; I.N.G.; Club d'Investissement Média; Bastille Films
- Distributed by: AFMD (France)
- Release date: 17 May 1995 (France)
- Running time: 85 minutes
- Countries: France; Venezuela; Belgium; Spain
- Languages: French; Italian; Spanish; English

Celestial Clockwork (French: Mécaniques célestes) is a 1995 comedy-drama co-produced between France, Venezuela, Belgium and Spain directed by Fina Torres and starring mainly Ariadna Gil.

== Plot ==
Ana, a young singer from Caracas who is about to get married, runs away to Paris. The stars are both good and bad for her: at the same time she meets a friendly group of Latinos and the upstart and unsettling video artist Céleste.

Like the tale of Cinderella, the great impresario Italo Medici, portrayed by Lluis Homar, is casting for a film of Rossini's Cinderella, is looking for unknown talent, and only has an audio cassette of the voice of Ana (Spanish actress Ariadna Gil). The famous man in the local community is like a prince looking for the future princess, but with only an audio cassette instead of a glass slipper. However, this film called "Celestial Clockwork" has video artist Céleste, a wicked stepmotherlike character who is called La Pirata (French actress Arielle Dombasle), who also dreams of being cast for the role and tries to sabotage Ana.

== Cast ==
- Ariadna Gil as Ana
  - Elsa Maurus as Ana (singing voice)
- Arielle Dombasle as Céleste
- Evelyne Didi as Alcanie
- Lluís Homar as Italo Medici
- Frédéric Longbois as Armand
- Hildegarde García Madriz as Toutou
- Michel Debrane as Grigorief
- Olivier Granier as Claude
- Alma Rosa Castellanos as Lucila
- Philippe Beautier as Hervé
- Pedro De Llano as Marlano
- Chantal Aimée as Tina
- Dominique Abel as Gaby

== Production ==
The film was a French-Venezuelan-Belgian-Spanish co-production shot in Paris, Caracas, Clarines and Lisbon.

== Release ==
The film was theatrically released in France on 17 May 1995.

== Film critic review ==
Film critic Roger Ebert wrote:

Much of the movie's charm comes from the glow and charisma of Ariadna Gil, who has a beautiful smile–and just as well since she smiles so much during the movie.

== Awards ==
Year	Festival	Award
1995	Namur International Francophone Film Festival	Prize of the public of the city of Namur to Fina Torres.
1996	Outfest (Los Angeles Gay and Lesbian Film Festival)	Grand Jury Prize for the best story for Mécaniques célestes.
