= Jane Chambers =

American playwright (1937–1983)

Jane Chambers (March 27, 1937 – February 15, 1983) was an American playwright, best known for her play, Last Summer at Bluefish Cove and as the first openly lesbian playwright in mainstream theater.

== Biography ==
Chambers was born Carolyn Jane Chambers in Columbia, South Carolina, but grew up in Orlando, Florida, where she started writing with scripts for local public radio stations. She studied at Rollins College, intending to become a playwright, but dropped out after a year.

She studied acting for a season at the Pasadena Playhouse in 1956, then moved to New York City, acting in off-Broadway productions and reporting for theatrical trade papers. She moved to Poland, Maine, where she worked as a writer and broadcaster for WMTW between 1964 and 1966, then as the director of avocation at the Poland Spring Job Corp Center. Returning to New York in 1968, she enrolled at Goddard College in Vermont to try again for an undergraduate degree. There she met Beth Allen, who would remain her lover, companion and manager.

Completing her degree in 1971, Chambers began to achieve recognition as a writer: she won the Rosenthal Award for Poetry, and her play Christ in a Treehouse, won a Connecticut Educational Television Award. In 1972, she received a Eugene O'Neill Fellowship for Tales of the Revolution and Other American Fables, staged at the Eugene O'Neill Memorial Theater. She helped establish theater at the Women's Interart Center in New York, putting on her play Random Violence there in 1972. Her writing for the soap opera Search for Tomorrow won her a Writers Guild of America Award in 1973. A Late Snow, produced at Playwrights Horizons in 1974 was one of the earliest plays to portray lesbian characters in a positive light. In 1980, Chambers started to work with The Glines, writing Last Summer at Bluefish Cove for their First Gay American Arts Festival, about the impact upon a woman and her lesbian friends after she is diagnosed with cancer. Chambers was herself diagnosed with cancer in 1981. She continued to write, producing My Blue Heaven for the Second Gay American Arts Festival at the Glines, and The Quintessential Image for the Women's Theatre Conference in Minneapolis.

She died from a brain tumor at her home in Greenport, Long Island on February 15, 1983. In 1984, the Association for Theatre in Higher Education established the Jane Chambers Playwriting Award.

In 2022, Chambers was featured in the book 50 Key Figures in Queer US Theatre, with a profile written by theatre scholar Sara Warner.

== Awards ==
- Connecticut Educational Television Award, 1971
- Eugene O'Neill Prize, 1972
- National Writer's Guild Award, 1972
- Annual Award of the Fund of Human Dignity, 1982

== Works ==
- Burning: a novel, 1978
- A late snow: a play in two acts, 1979
- Last summer at Bluefish Cove: a play in two acts, 1980
- My blue heaven: a comedy in two acts, 1981
- Warrior at rest: a collection of poetry, 1984
- Chasin' Jason: a novel, 1987
