= Princeton University Orchestra =

- Orchestra
- Founded: 1896
- Location: Princeton, New Jersey
- Concert hall: Alexander Hall
- Principal conductor: Michael Pratt
- Website: orchestra.princeton.edu

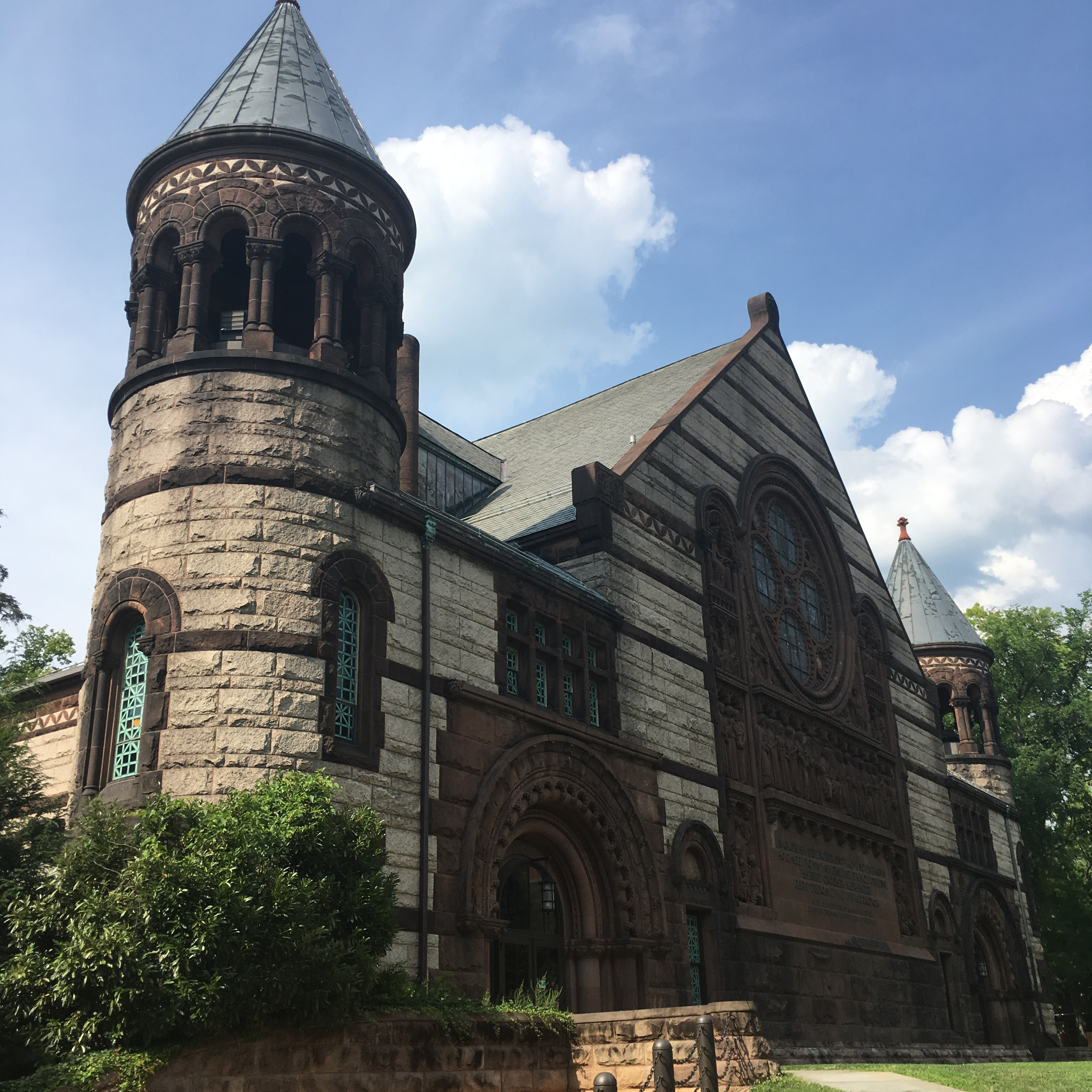
Alexander Hall, housing Richardson Auditorium, home of the Princeton University Orchestra

The Princeton University Orchestra (PUO) is the flagship symphony orchestra of Princeton University. The ensemble tours internationally and includes over 100 musicians, almost all of whom are undergraduates at the university. Every academic year, the Princeton University Orchestra holds eight or nine concerts in Richardson Auditorium in Alexander Hall.

The current music director of the Princeton University Orchestra is Michael J. Pratt. Pratt has held this position since 1977, rendering PUO's 2024 season his 47th at the helm of the ensemble.

== History ==
=== Early beginnings ===
The roots of music performance at Princeton can be traced back to 1791, when a group of student musicians filled the belfry of a candle-lit Nassau Hall and serenaded the guests of President Witherspoon's second wedding. Student groups calling themselves the "Instrumental Club" existed in the late 1800s, and precisely one century after the 1791 wedding ceremony, the name "Princeton University Orchestra" made its first-ever appearance in the 14 January 1891 publication of the New York Times. The official founding date of the ensemble recognized by Princeton's Department of Music is 13 February 1896, when professional musicians from New York orchestras performed several concerts in Alexander Hall.

For its first 25 years of history, the Princeton University Orchestra was relatively small and largely student-led; after the conclusion of the first World War, however, Richard L. Weaver was appointed as the symphony's first proper music director. In 1935, the music director roles for both the University Orchestra and the University Glee Club were officially established as full-time positions within Princeton's Department of Music. Over the subsequent forty years, PUO grew to as many as sixty students, and music directors of the ensemble included Harold Berkeley, Mortiz von Bomhard, Russell Ames Cook, Nicholas Harsanyi, Robert S. Freeman, Peter T. Westergaard, Mordechai Sheinkman, and Bruce Ferden.

=== Expansion and growth ===
The modern history of PUO begins with the appointment of the orchestra's present music director, Michael J. Pratt, in 1977. Through the fifties and sixties, the ensemble shrank down to as few as thirty students amid "music-is-better-seen-than-heard" mentalities in music academia, as well as insufficient rehearsal and performance spaces on campus. Following Pratt's appointment to the orchestra's podium, this downward trend quickly reversed itself into an upwards explosion. In 1984, the orchestra's home, Alexander Hall, was renovated from a large auditorium into a professional-grade concert hall following generous support from David Richardson. Additionally, unprecedented interest in music performance among students, coupled with growth in the overall undergraduate class size and the development of Princeton's dedicated extracurricular hours (two hours every weekday during which classes are forbidden from meeting), allowed PUO to quickly expand into the large symphonic orchestra of over 100 students that it remains today.

In response to students in the orchestra expressing a desire to continue as musicians after their studies at Princeton, Michael Pratt established the Music Department's Certificate Program in Music Performance in 1990, and he was a major architect in the general integration of performance into Princeton's wider curriculum. Undergraduate musicians in the Music Performance certificate receive complementary lessons and are eligible to spend a semester abroad studying at the Royal College of Music, which has been named one of the top music conservatories in the world. Following the creation of a strong music performance program, the conductor noted a significant upswing in Princeton University applicants with exceptional musical talent and interest, which in turn allowed the Princeton University Orchestra to grow into an even stronger ensemble, able to tackle any piece in the classical repertoire. In 2018, there were enough applicants to the incoming class alone to fill multiple large symphonic orchestras.

== The orchestra today ==
Nowadays, the orchestra is recognized for its musical excellence, and its music director, Michael Pratt, has been named an honorary member of the Royal College of Music in London by Charles, Prince of Wales.

The Princeton University Orchestra is now one of two undergraduate full-orchestras at Princeton University. The other undergraduate full-orchestra is the Princeton University Sinfonia, which is led by the associate conductor of PUO, Ruth Ochs PhD, and features a less-demanding rehearsal and concert schedule. Auditions for both orchestras, which are held in early September before Department of Music faculty, are open to all university students, and all returning members are required to re-audition. A week after the audition, students receive notice whether they have been tapped for one of the department orchestras.

=== The Lewis Arts Complex ===
Until 2017, the Princeton University Orchestra held rehearsals thrice per week in its home, Richardson Auditorium in Alexander Hall. In the fall of that year, following the grand opening of Princeton University's $330 million performing-arts center, the orchestra's rehearsals were moved to the new 3,500 square-foot Lee Rehearsal Room, which was designed for the orchestra specifically and features both adaptive acoustics and equipment for high-fidelity audio recordings. During concert weeks, the orchestra returns to its home in Richardson Auditorium for dress rehearsals.

In addition to housing a state-of-the-art rehearsal space, the New Music Building within the Lewis Arts Complex also features practice rooms and rehearsal studios suspended by wires for sound-isolation. All musicians in the Princeton University Orchestra receive discounted music lessons with department faculty in these rooms and are granted access to them for free. As stated by former University President Shirley Tilghman, who championed the planning and development of the new Lewis Arts Complex, the aim for the New Music Building is to establish Princeton University as an international hub for art and music alike — the hope is that Princeton is one day as well known to the world for its music and performing-arts as it is for its rigorous academics and research.

=== Repertoire and tour ===
The late-Romantics form the foundation of the Princeton University Orchestra's repertoire. The ensemble performs a work by Gustav Mahler roughly three out of every four years, and frequently collaborates with the Princeton University Glee Club on works that require a concert choir. In addition to performing large symphonic works from the established classical canon, the ensemble also gives frequent premieres of new works composed by faculty and even undergraduate students. Every season, there is one concerto concert that features musicians from the orchestra; concerto auditions are held in January.

Thanks to generous donations from University Alumni, the Princeton University Orchestra tours internationally every other year; tour costs are funded entirely through the ensemble's shared endowment with the Glee Club. The Princeton University Orchestra's first international tour was to the United Kingdom in 1994. Since then, PUO has performed in Germany, Austria, the Netherlands, Czechia, Slovakia, Hungary, Spain, Portugal, and Ireland, among others. In late January 2019, the orchestra will return to Spain for concerts in Barcelona, Zaragoza, and Madrid.

=== Gustavo Dudamel Residency ===
In celebration of Princeton University Concerts' 125th anniversary, conducting sensation Gustavo Dudamel was chosen as the Princeton University artist-in-residence for 2018 – 2019. Throughout the academic year, Dudamel will visit the campus for cross-disciplinary discussions, academic panels, and cultural celebrations. He has curated three chamber concerts in Alexander Hall that feature musicians from the Los Angeles Philharmonic, the Metropolitan Opera Orchestra, and the Berlin Philharmonic. As the culmination of his residency, Dudamel will conduct the Princeton University Orchestra and the Princeton University Glee Club twice in-concert, the first of which will be held in Richardson Auditorium, and the second of which will be held at the Trenton War Memorial. This will be Dudamel's first concert engagement with any university orchestra.
