= Gustavo Dudamel =

Venezuelan conductor and violinist (born 1981)

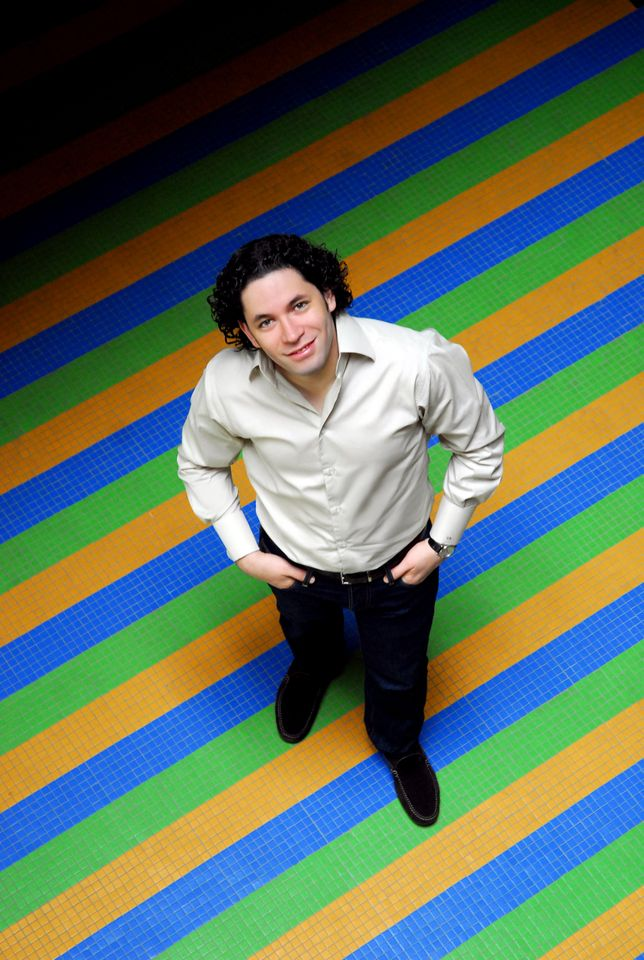
- Dudamel in 2008
- Born: Gustavo Adolfo Dudamel Ramírez; 26 January 1981 (age 45); Barquisimeto, Lara, Venezuela
- Citizenship: Venezuela (1981–present); Spain (2018–present)
- Occupations: Conductor; violinist; composer
- Years active: 1999–present
- Organizations: Simón Bolívar Symphony Orchestra; Los Angeles Philharmonic; New York Philharmonic
- Spouses: Eloísa Maturén (m. 2006; div. 2015) María Valverde (m. 2017)
- Children: 1
- Gustavo Dudamel's voice At the premiere of Music by John Williams; Recorded October 2024
- Website: gustavodudamel.com

Gustavo Adolfo Dudamel Ramírez (born 26 January 1981) is a Venezuelan conductor. He is the music director of the Simón Bolívar Symphony Orchestra and former music director of the Los Angeles Philharmonic. He became music and artistic director of the New York Philharmonic in 2026.

== Early life ==
Dudamel was born in 1981 in Barquisimeto, Lara. His father was a trombonist and his mother was a voice teacher. He studied music from an early age. In 1986, he became involved with El Sistema, the famous Venezuelan social action music programme, where he began violin lessons. He soon began to study composition. He attended the Jacinto Lara Conservatory, where José Luis Jiménez was among his violin teachers. He then went on to work with José Francisco del Castillo at the Latin-American Violin Academy.

Dudamel began to study conducting in 1995, first with Rodolfo Saglimbeni, then later with José Antonio Abreu. In 1999, he was appointed music director of the Simón Bolívar Symphony Orchestra, the national youth orchestra of Venezuela, and toured several countries. He attended Charles Dutoit's master class in Buenos Aires, Argentina in 2002, and worked as assistant conductor to Simon Rattle in Berlin, Germany and Salzburg, Austria in 2003.

== Conducting career ==
Dudamel won a number of competitions, including the Gustav Mahler Conducting Competition in Germany in 2004. His reputation began to spread, attracting the attention of conductors such as Simon Rattle and Claudio Abbado, who accepted invitations to conduct the Simón Bolívar Orchestra in Veneite. In April 2006 Dudamel was appointed as principal conductor of the Gothenburg Symphony for the 2007/2008 season.

Dudamel made his debut at La Scala, Milan, with Don Giovanni in November 2006. On 10 September 2007, he conducted the Vienna Philharmonic for the first time at the Lucerne Festival. On 16 April 2007 he conducted the Stuttgart Radio Symphony Orchestra at the Vatican's Paul VI Audience Hall in a concert in commemoration of the 80th birthday of Pope Benedict XVI, with Hilary Hahn as solo violinist, the pope and many other Church dignitaries were among the audience.

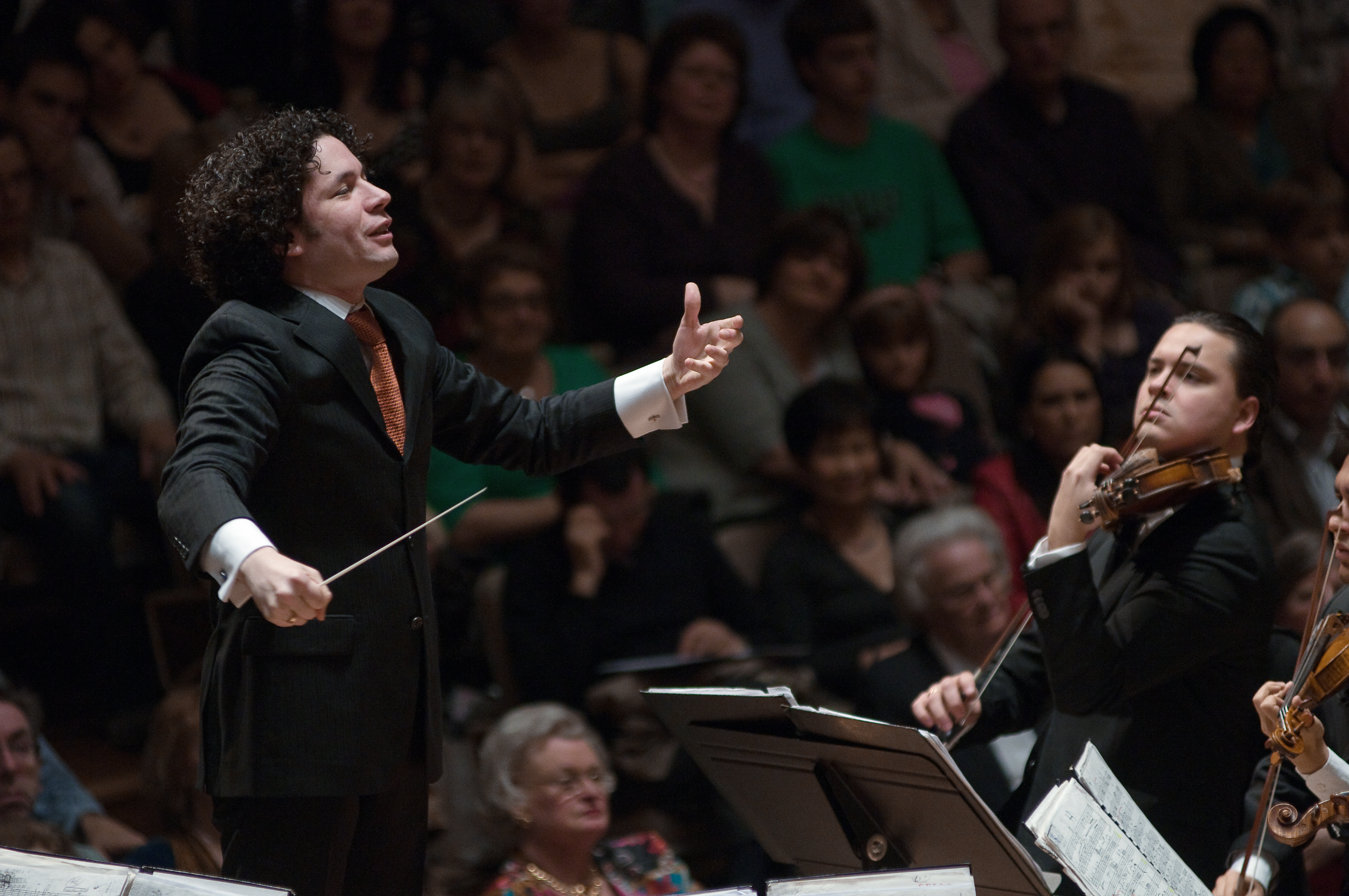
Gustavo Dudamel conducts at the Simon Bolivar Youth Orchestra at London's Royal Festival Hall

In 2013, El Sistema arranged for Dudamel to conduct the Simon Bolivar Symphony Orchestra during the funeral of Hugo Chávez, which was attended by nearly two dozen heads of state.

In 2015, Dudamel conducted both the opening and end titles, at the request of John Williams, for the official motion picture soundtrack and film of Star Wars: The Force Awakens. At the 2016 Super Bowl, Dudamel and Youth Orchestra Los Angeles (YOLA) accompanied Coldplay and sang along with Chris Martin, Beyoncé, and Bruno Mars.

On 1 January 2017, Dudamel conducted the Vienna Philharmonic in the New Year's Day Concert, the youngest conductor to lead this event. In December 2018, he made his debut at the Metropolitan Opera in New York City, conducting Verdi's Otello.

Dudamel served as the 2018–2019 artist-in-residence at Princeton University in New Jersey near New York, in celebration of Princeton University Concerts' 125th anniversary. This engagement included cross-disciplinary and cross-cultural panels & discussions, chamber concerts featuring musicians from his associated orchestras (the Met, in NYC; Los Angeles; and Berlin), and in April 2019, Dudamel conducted the Princeton University Orchestra and the Princeton University Glee Club as the culmination of his year-long residency.

=== Opéra National de Paris ===
Dudamel first guest-conducted at the Opéra national de Paris in 2017. In April 2021, the Opéra National de Paris announced the appointment of Dudamel as its next music director, effective 1 August 2021, with an initial contract of six seasons. In May 2023, Dudamel announced his resignation as music director of the Opéra National de Paris, effective August 2023.

Dudamel conducted the Simón Bolívar Symphony Orchestra during its appearance at the 2023 Edinburgh International Festival. It was the first time he had conducted the orchestra since 2017.

=== Los Angeles Philharmonic ===
Dudamel made his US conducting debut with the Los Angeles Philharmonic (LAP) at the Hollywood Bowl on 13 September 2005 in a program consisting of "La Noche de los Mayas" by Silvestre Revueltas and Tchaikovsky's Symphony No. 5. Dudamel was subsequently invited back to conduct the orchestra at Walt Disney Concert Hall in January 2007 in performances of "Dances of Galánta" by Zoltán Kodály, the third piano concerto of Sergei Rachmaninoff with Yefim Bronfman as soloist, and Béla Bartók's Concerto for Orchestra (the latter of which was recorded live and subsequently released by Deutsche Grammophon).

In April 2007, the LAP announced the appointment of Dudamel as its next music director, effective with the 2009–2010 season. His initial contract in Los Angeles was for five years, beginning in September 2009. In February 2011, the orchestra announced the extension of Dudamel's contract through the end of the 2018–2019 season. In March 2015, the orchestra announced a further extension of his Los Angeles Philharmonic contract through the 2021–2022 season. In January 2020, the LAP announced a further extension of his contract through the 2025–2026 season. In February 2023, the LAP announced that Dudamel is to conclude his music directorship of the orchestra at the close of the 2025–2026 season.

=== New York Philharmonic ===
Dudamel first guest-conducted the New York Philharmonic in 2007. Following 26 additional guest-conducting appearances with the orchestra, the New York Philharmonic announced the appointment of Dudamel as its next music and artistic director, the first Latin American named to the post, effective with the 2026–2027 season, with an initial contract of five years. Dudamel will first serve as music director designate during the 2025–2026 season, leading up to his official start in his role as music and artistic director the following year.

== Awards and media ==
Dudamel is featured in the documentary film Tocar y Luchar, which covers El Sistema. Dudamel and the Orquesta Sinfónica Simón Bolívar received the WQXR Gramophone Special Recognition Award in New York City in November 2007. Another US television news feature on Dudamel was on 60 Minutes in February 2008, entitled "Gustavo the Great."

On 23 July 2009, Dudamel was selected by the Eighth Glenn Gould Prize laureate José Antonio Abreu as winner of the prestigious The City of Toronto Glenn Gould Protégé Prize.

Dudamel was named one of Time magazine's most influential 100 people in 2010.

Dudamel is featured in the 2011 documentary Let the Children Play, a film which focuses on his work advocating for music as a way to enrich children's lives.

Gramophone named Dudamel its 2011 Gramophone Artist of the Year. Also in 2011, he was inducted into the Royal Swedish Academy of Music. In February 2012, Dudamel won a Grammy Award for Best Orchestral Performance, for his recording of Brahms Symphony No. 4 for the label Deutsche Grammophon. In 2013, Dudamel was named Musical America's Musician of the Year and was inducted into the Gramophone Hall of Fame. Dudamel received the Leonard Bernstein Lifetime Achievement Award for the Elevation of Music in Society from the Longy School in 2014 and the Americas Society Cultural Achievement Award in 2016.

The character of Rodrigo in Amazon's Mozart in the Jungle was based, in part, on Dudamel. In the first episode of the show's second season, in which Rodrigo appears as a guest conductor for the Los Angeles Philharmonic, Dudamel appears as a guest actor, playing the part of a stage manager.

In June 2018, Dudamel received Chile's Pablo Neruda Order of Artistic and Cultural Merit. Also in June, the Venezuelan American Endowment for the Arts (VAEA) awarded Dudamel the Paez Medal of Art 2018.

On 18 October 2018, Dudamel was announced as the 25th recipient of the Dorothy and Lillian Gish Prize.

Dudamel received a star on the Hollywood Walk of Fame on 22 January 2019.

At the 64th Annual Grammy Awards the Grammy Award for Best Choral Performance was given to the Dudamel-conducted 2019 recording of Mahler's Symphony No. 8.

Dudamel made guest appearances in Sesame Street and The Simpsons.

In the summer of 2019, Dudamel conducted the orchestra during the recording sessions for Steven Spielberg's 2021 film adaptation of West Side Story.

In 2020, Dudamel made a cameo appearance as Trollzart in DreamWorks' Trolls World Tour.

In April 2023, Dudamel was elected into the American Academy of Arts and Sciences. On 23 May 2024, Dudamel was awarded the honorary degree of Doctor of Music from Harvard University. In 2024, Dudamel received the Golden Plate Award of the American Academy of Achievement, presented by Awards Council member Andrew Lloyd Webber on the stage of David Geffen Hall at Lincoln Center in New York City.

He is a foreign member of the Royal Swedish Academy of Music.

In 2025, at the 67th Annual Grammy Awards, Gustavo Dudamel won a Grammy Award for his track "Ortiz: Revolución Diamantina" under category Best Classical Compendium. and again in 2026 at the 68th Annual Grammy Awards, Dudamel won under the same category for his track "Ortiz: Yanga".

He performed at the 2026 FIFA World Cup final halftime show.

On 19 November 2026, Dudamel was awarded the Henry E. Howland Memorial Prize from Yale University.

== Political views ==
Writing for an op-ed in the Los Angeles Times in 2015, he argued that taking sides in Venezuela's conflict could politicize El Sistema, which could be a threat to the institution, saying: "For those who think I've been silent too long, I say, don't mistake my lack of a political stance for a lack of compassion or ideals." After the killing of El Sistema violist Armando Cañizales during the 2017 Venezuelan protests, Dudamel condemned the government of Nicolás Maduro's response to the demonstrations for the first time, writing in social media: "I raise my voice against violence and repression. Nothing can justify bloodshed. Enough of ignoring the just clamor of a people suffocated by an intolerable crisis."

In 2019, in a speech accepting his star on the Hollywood Walk of Fame, he said that it should belong to Venezuela, and that "tomorrow [23 Jan. 2019] is a crucial day [and] the voice of the masses must be heard and respected", referring to the planned national protest on that date and the Venezuelan presidential crisis. In 2022, he returned to Venezuela and reconnected with family and friends as well as students and teachers at El Sistema. Speaking about El Sistema, Dudamel said, "I have made it my personal mission not to rest until music is truly a fundamental human right for everyone. El Sistema has endured through seven different governments in Venezuela. It is not about politics. It is about the shared belief that art must be a part of the fabric of society". He considered that the political situation in the country had improved but that there were still problems that needed to be addressed, saying: "People have the desire to get out of this unrest — this political, ideological unrest — and really make things move forward" and that “There has been a change, but we need to keep working to make things better because they are still very difficult.”

== Personal life ==
Dudamel has been married twice. His first marriage, in 2006, was to Eloísa Maturén in Caracas. Maturén, also a Venezuelan native, is a classically trained ballet dancer and a journalist. The two had a son in April 2011. In March 2015, Dudamel and Maturén divorced. In February 2017, Dudamel secretly married Spanish actress María Valverde, whom he had first met in 2016, in Las Vegas, Nevada. He became a Spanish citizen in 2018.

== Discography ==
2006

- Beethoven: Symphonies Nos. 5 & 7 [w/ the Simón Bolívar Youth Orchestra of Venezuela] CD

2007

- Birthday Concert for Pope Benedict XVI [w/ Hilary Hahn & the Radio-Sinfonieorchester Stuttgart] DVD
- Mahler: Symphony No. 5 [w/ the Simón Bolívar Youth Orchestra of Venezuela] CD
- Bartók: Concerto for Orchestra [w/ the Los Angeles Philharmonic] Digital Download only

2008

- The Promise of Music [w/ the Simón Bolívar Youth Orchestra of Venezuela] DVD
- Fiesta [w/ the Simón Bolívar Youth Orchestra of Venezuela] CD
- Berlioz: Symphonie Fantastique [w/ the Los Angeles Philharmonic] Digital Download only

2009

- Gustavo Dudamel and the Los Angeles Philharmonic: The Inaugural Concert [w/ the Los Angeles Philharmonic] DVD; e-Video
- Mahler: Symphony No. 1 (From the Inaugural Concert) [w/ the Los Angeles Philharmonic] Digital Download only
- Discoveries [w/ the Simón Bolívar Youth Orchestra of Venezuela] CD
- Live from Salzburg [w/ the Simón Bolívar Youth Orchestra of Venezuela] DVD
- Tchaikovsky: Symphony No. 5; Francesca da Rimini [w/ the Simón Bolívar Youth Orchestra of Venezuela] CD
- Piotr Anderszewski: Voyageur intranquille; a film by Bruno Monsaingeon. Credited: with the artistic participation of Philharmonia Orchestra London – conducted by Gustavo Dudamel] Blu-ray

2010

- Celebración – Opening Night Concert & Gala [w/ Juan Diego Flórez and the Los Angeles Philharmonic] DVD; Digital Download
- John Adams: City Noir (From the Inaugural Concert) [w/ the Los Angeles Philharmonic] Digital Download only
- Rite [w/ the Simón Bolívar Youth Orchestra of Venezuela] CD

2011

- Sibelius: Symphony No. 2 – Nielsen: Symphonies Nos. 4 & 5 – Bruckner: Symphony No. 9 [w/ the Gothenburg Symphony Orchestra] CD
- Tchaikovsky & Shakespeare [w/ the Simón Bolívar Symphony Orchestra of Venezuela] CD
- New Year's Eve Concert 2010 [w/ Elīna Garanča and the Berliner Philharmoniker] DVD
- John Adams: Slonimsky's Earbox – Bernstein: Symphony No. 1 "Jeremiah" [w/ the Los Angeles Philharmonic] Digital Download only
- Brahms: Symphony No. 4 [w/ the Los Angeles Philharmonic] Digital Download only

2012

- An American in Paris [w/ the Los Angeles Philharmonic] e-Video only
- Dances and Waves [w/ the Vienna Philharmonic] CD; DVD; Digital Download
- Mendelssohn: Symphony No. 3 [w/ the Vienna Philharmonic] Vinyl only (LP)
- Beethoven: Symphony No. 3, "Eroica" [w/ the Simón Bolívar Symphony Orchestra of Venezuela] CD
- Discoveries [w/ Simón Bolívar Symphony Orchestra of Venezuela, Berliner Philharmoniker, Wiener Philharmoniker, Gothenburg Symphony Orchestra] CD+DVD; Digital Download
- Mahler: Symphony No. 8 [w/ Los Angeles Philharmonic and the Simón Bolívar Symphony Orchestra of Venezuela] DVD; Blu-ray; e-Video
- Summer Night Concert (Sommernachtskonzert) 2012: Dances and Waves; Wiener Philharmoniker; DVD; Deutsche Grammophon

2013

- Mahler: Symphony No. 9 [w/ Los Angeles Philharmonic] CD
- Verdi: Messa da Requiem [w/ Los Angeles Philharmonic and Los Angeles Master Chorale] Blu-ray
- Rachmaninov: Piano Concerto No. 3; Prokofiev: Piano Concerto No. 2 [w/ Yuja Wang, piano and Simon Bolivar Symphony Orchestra of Venezuela] CD
- Richard Strauss: Also Sprach Zarathustra; Till Eulenspiegels lustige Streiche; Don Juan [w/ Berliner Philarmoniker]

2014

- Mahler: Symphony No. 7. [w/ Símon Bolívar Symphony Orchestra of Venezuela] CD
- Gustavo Dudamel: The Liberator (Libertador); Original Soundtrack [w/ Orquesta Sinfónica Simón Bolívar de Venezuela] CD
- John Adams: The Gospel According to the Other Mary, a passion oratorio in two acts [w/ Los Angeles Philharmonic and Los Angeles Master Chorale] CD

2015

- Wagner [w/ Símon Bolívar Symphony Orchestra of Venezuela] Digital Download
- Philip Glass: Double Piano Concerto [w/ Katia and Marielle Labeque (Piano), Los Angeles Philharmonic] Only at iTunes
- John Williams: Star Wars: The Force Awakens. [Special guest conductor for four tracks] CD, DVD, Blu-ray, Digital Download

2017

- New Year Concert [w/ Vienna Philharmonic] CDs and Digital download.

2018

- The Nutcracker and the Four Realms original soundtrack CD and Digital Download

2022

- Dvořák: Symphonies Nos. 7–9 w/ Los Angeles Philharmonic Digital Download
