= Last Summer at Bluefish Cove =

Play written by Jane Chambers

- Original language: English
- Written by: Jane Chambers
- Characters: Lil; Eva; Dr. Kitty; Annie; Rita; Rae; Sue; Donna
- Genre: Comedy/Drama

Premiere
- Date: December 22, 1980
- Place: Actors Playhouse; New York City

Last Summer at Bluefish Cove is a 1980 American play by Jane Chambers. It is a landmark piece in lesbian dramatic literature as the first mainstream play of its kind.

The play focuses on the friendships and journeys of the eight women at Bluefish Cove. It was one of the first pieces of theatre to present lesbians as rounded, three-dimensional characters, avoiding the problematic and homophobic tropes that had been necessary to portray queer stories on stage. Chambers' comedic dialogue, sensitivity to human nature, and tender treatment of her characters help the play transcend preconceptions and show the universality of these women's journeys, whether straight or lesbian.

== Production history ==
Originally produced by The Glines (John Glines), artistic director and Lawrence Lane, managing director. Last Summer at Bluefish Cove had an AEA showcase production, directed by Harriet Leider, which opened at The Shandol Theater, West 22 Street, New York, NY, and ran March 13–30, 1980 before moving to the Actors Playhouse in New York City on December 22, 1980 and closed March 1, 1981 after 80 performances. The cast included Jean Smart as 'Lil', Susan Slavin as 'Eva', Janet Sarno as 'Dr. Kitty', Holly Barron as 'Annie', Dulcie Arnold as 'Rita', Lauren Craig as 'Rae', Celia Howard as 'Sue' and Robin Mary Paris as 'Donna'. Other credits include Director: Nyla Lyon, Set Design: Reagan Cook, Lighting Design: Jeffrey Schissler, Costume Design: Giva R. Taylor.

In Judy Miller's 1982 Los Angeles production, Jean Smart reprised the role of 'Lil', also featuring Lee Garlington (Rae), Camilla Carr (Kitty), Nora Heflin (Annie), Sandra J. Marshall (Eva), Dianne Turley Travis (Sue), Linda Cohen (Rita), and Shannon Kriska (Donna). The production was directed by Hilary Moshereece. The Production Stage Manager was Laurie Moore with Lighting by Dana Winkelman (also known as Gwin DeMatteo). It opened at the 99-seat Fountain Theater in Hollywood in 1982, running for 2.5 years, 4 nights a week to sold-out audiences. The production, its ensemble and Jean Smart won numerous awards during the run. These include the Los Angeles Drama Critics Circle Award for Jean Smart for Best Actress, as well as a nomination for Best Ensemble Performance. The production won seven Hollywood Drama-Logue Awards - Production, Direction, Writing (Jane Chambers), Ensemble, Lighting, Sets and Costumes, as well as Robby Awards and Oscar Wilde Awards for all the same 7 categories, and numerous GLAAD awards. The production also received a Certificate of Outstanding Theatre from the City of Los Angeles. Jean Smart was discovered at the LA Production by the casting director for Designing Women, leading to her starring role in that successful TV series.

In 1983 Judy Miller produced Bluefish at the 750-seat Theater on the Square in San Francisco featuring Susan Sullivan as Lil under Marshall W. Mason's direction, for which it received numerous awards.

In 1986, N. Leigh Dunlap and Kate Bornstein produced Bluefish in Philadelphia with some of the highest-profile lesbian activists of the time. They were invited to prestigious art festivals, including the Sister Space Women's Festival. As well as being a producer, Dunlap played the lead role of 'Lil' in this production.

The play has been performed for the past 30 years across the globe in hundreds of college and regional productions, often to sold-out audiences.

== Characters ==
Kitty - Has just left her medical clinic to become a full-time writer after she took the feminist world by storm with her book The Female Sexual Imperative. A force to be reckoned with in any situation, Kitty is terrified of being publicly outed, and worries that Eva’s arrival at Bluefish Cove might expose her.

Rita — Kitty's level-headed secretary and lover. She's punctual, to-the-point, and insightful.

Donna — A party girl in her early 20s who faces accusations of being a gold digger in her relationship with the older Sue.

Sue — A wealthy and weathered blueblood, involved with the much younger Donna – an age difference which Sue is self-conscious about.

Rae — A second-wave feminist through and through – which sometimes clashes with her stereotypically “feminine,” housewife-type sensibilities and likes.

Annie — A master sculptor who’s been involved with Rae for 10 years. Described as "strong, spunky, and artistic".

Lil – Sarcastic, witty, knows how to clean a fish in her sleep. Dying of cancer, but keeping the diagnosis close to her chest. The only single lesbian at the start of the play.

Eva – Caring and somewhat sheltered, Eva has just left her husband of nearly a decade at the start of the play, and is staying at Bluefish Cove unaware that it is a lesbian colony. Entering a new chapter in her life, Eva is open to new ideas and experiences – including exploring her sexuality.

== Plot ==
Act One begins with a chance encounter: Lil is a regular at Bluefish Cove, fishing on the coast. Eva is a fairly naïve housewife who has just left her husband and has rented a cottage at Bluefish Cove on a whim. Lil feels an immediate attraction for Eva, but she misunderstands Lil’s flirting as friendliness, and Lil fails to realize that Eva is straight, inviting her to a party later that night. Bluefish Cove has become somewhat of a lesbian colony, a haven for Lil and her friends. Lil is mortified upon realizing Eva is not a lesbian, but Eva doesn’t take any hints and shows up at the party.

To soften the blow, Lil convinces her friends to pretend they are all straight, at least for the party. When Eva arrives, she and Kitty – who is terrified of being outed – stumble through awkward dialogue until Donna and Sue arrive. Not aware that they are supposed to be pretending to be straight, Donna and Sue exclaim that they are lesbians - and that everyone at the cove is a lesbian. Eva realizes her misunderstanding to everyone’s extreme embarrassment and leaves. Later, she returns to Lil and their attraction is actualized – they begin an affair, but Lil conceals her cancer from Eva.

Act Two jumps to midsummer. Lil’s cancer has significantly progressed, and she collapses in agonizing pain. Refusing to undergo any further treatment or have any more organs removed, Lil has accepted that this summer at Bluefish Cove will be her last. It is a crushing realization to Lil that this coincides with her first real love, Eva. Still, Eva refuses to be pushed away by Lil’s tough exterior and promises to spend the rest of Lil’s time by her side.

The last scene shows Lil’s friends mourning her recent death. A number of commitments have been made in her honor – Kitty decides to reopen her OBGYN practice, Eva considers renting Lil’s cabin next summer...all of the friends feel Lil’s loss, but resolve to maintain their connection to Bluefish Cove, Lil’s favorite place.
