= Simón Bolívar Symphony Orchestra =

Venezuelan orchestra

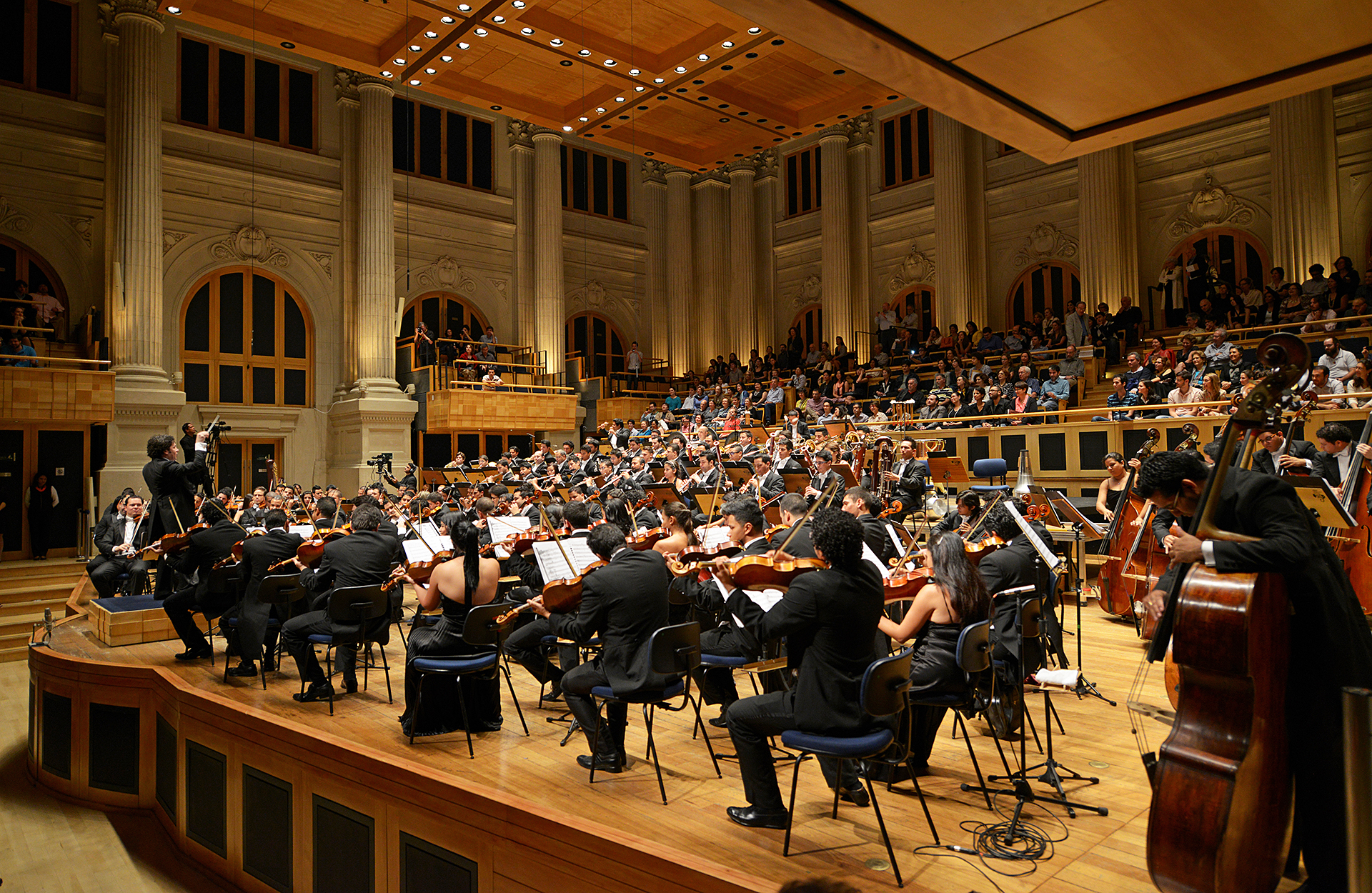
The Simón Bolívar Symphony Orchestra during a performance in 2013 at the Julio Prestes Cultural Complex, São Paulo, Brazil

The Simón Bolívar Symphony Orchestra of Venezuela (Spanish: Orquesta Sinfónica Simón Bolívar de Venezuela) is a Venezuelan symphony orchestra. Named after the Venezuelan national hero Simón Bolívar, it was initially the apex of El Sistema, the country's system of youth orchestras. It has been called a "great pride" of the country's artistic life with some of the country's best young classically trained musicians.

The economist José Antonio Abreu established the first Orquesta Sinfónica Simón Bolívar on 12 February 1978. Gustavo Dudamel has been the orchestra's artistic director since 1999. The orchestra has performed internationally under notable conductors, including Claudio Abbado, Simon Rattle, Daniel Barenboim and others.

By 2011, it was no longer a youth orchestra, as the average age of its members had reached the early 20s. The next official national youth orchestra is known as the Teresa Carreño Youth Orchestra.

== Mission and history ==
Venezuela's youth orchestras are run under the auspices of the Fundación Musical Simón Bolívar and are part of El Sistema, Venezuela's music education programme. As The Guardian wrote in 2023, the Simón Bolívar Symphony Orchestra (SBSO) represents "a message of social inclusion and the manifest power of music to bring communities together".

The orchestra consists of 180 members, who work under El Sistema’s Orchestral Academic Programme. Orchestra members have performed under Simon Rattle, Claudio Abbado, Daniel Barenboim, Krzysztof Penderecki, Esa-Pekka Salonen and Lorin Maazel and other internationally-known conductors.

Based in Caracas, the orchestra moved its home in 2007 from the Teresa Carreño Cultural Complex to a new Center for Social Action Through Music nearby. The name of the center reflects the claim that El Sistema sees itself as a social agency. Most of its music students come from poor socio-economic backgrounds.

During his presidency, Hugo Chávez was a strong supporter of El Sistema, placing it under the executive branch of the government and providing funding of $100 million a year. As a result, the Simón Bolívar Symphony Orchestra became an essential part of national ceremonies. In 2013, El Sistema arranged for Gustavo Dudamel to conduct the Simon Bolivar Symphony Orchestra during the funeral of Chávez, which was attended by nearly two dozen heads of state.

Gustavo Dudamel conducted the orchestra for its 2014 concerts at the Emirates Palace. In an interview prior to the performances, Dudamel said "In Venezuela we encourage what is right for the individual, but even more so what is right for the group".

== Political protests and repression ==
Several musicians of El Sistema participated in the antigovernment 2017 protests, and in response many were detained, tortured or killed. On 3 May 2017, 18-years-old El Sistema violist Armando Cañizales was killed by security forces while participating in a demonstration in Caracas. Gustavo Dudamel condemned Nicolás Maduro's response to the protests for the first time the day after the killing, writing in social media: "I raise my voice against violence and repression. Nothing can justify bloodshed. Enough of ignoring the just clamor of a people suffocated by an intolerable crisis."

Violin player Wuilly Arteaga also participated, playing his instrument during the protests that year. On 24 May, a National Guardsman officer broke his violin. Arteaga's images crying over the violin went viral, and several people offered to give him a violin to replace the broken one. He was imprisoned on charges of public instigation and possession of incendiary substance. During his detention he was transferred four times and subjected to torture. When he was arrested, security forces burned his hair with a lighter for having very long hair. He was beaten with sticks and helmets when he was transferred to Fort Tiuna, and before arriving at the last prison, he was hit in the back of the head with a metal tube, causing internal bleeding and leaving him deaf in his right ear. During his detention he denounced that he witnessed how security agents raped a young woman detained on top of him inside an armoured vehicle. While he was imprisoned he had nowhere to write, he was forbidden to receive or send letters, there were no visitors, and the prisoners were isolated and without ventilation. Even so, he composed the song "Cárcel de libertad" (Freedom Prison) along with his best friend Aarón, also detained.

== Critical reception ==
In August 2007, the orchestra made its debut at the BBC Proms, to critical acclaim and an enthusiastic reception from the audience. The concert was broadcast live on BBC Radio 3 and deferred live on BBC Four.

A BBC TV documentary programme in the Imagine arts series, first shown on 18 November 2008, examined the history and ethos of the orchestra and its role in tackling the social problems of Venezuela and its success in transforming the lives of some of the nation's poorest children, including interviews with Dudamel, key members of the orchestra, and current and former students. Hosted by Alan Yentob, the film took a detailed look at the music education system of Venezuela, of which the orchestra is an integral part, and described a project inspired by El Sistema's success in Raploch, a deprived district of the city of Stirling, Scotland.

In 2007, the orchestra and Dudamel appeared at Carnegie Hall. In 2012, the music critic of the British The Times wrote that the high international profile of the SBSO under Dudamel was a factor in the creation of a national youth orchestra in the United States.

One of the most significant moments with this particular orchestra, is Leonard Bernstein's "Mambo" from West Side Story.

== Discography ==
The SBSO and Dudamel have made four recordings for Deutsche Grammophon with music by Beethoven, Mahler and Tchaikovsky, as well as a collection of Latin American music. The orchestra had previously released other recordings in the early 1990s on the Dorian Recordings label, including several ballet pieces.

== See also ==
- List of youth orchestras
