= Patricia Velásquez =

Venezuelan actress, model, and humanitarian advocate

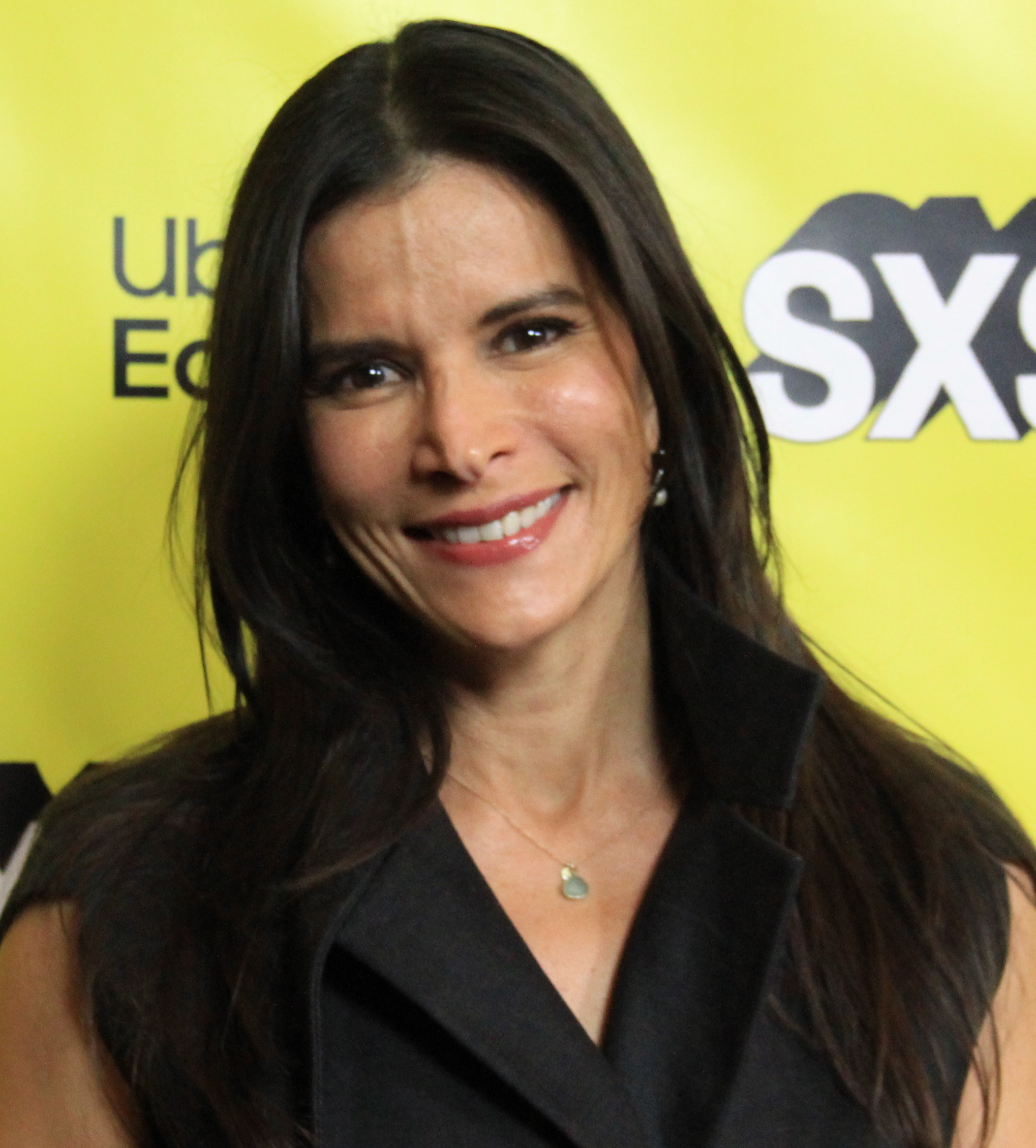
- Velásquez at South by Southwest in 2019
- Born: Patricia Carola Velásquez Semprún; 31 January 1971 (age 55); Maracaibo, Venezuela
- Occupations: Actress; Model; Author; Public Speaker
- Years active: 1989–present
- Known for: The Mummy; The Mummy Returns; Committed; The Curse of La Llorona; Liz in September
- Children: 1
- Modeling information
- Height: 1.74 m (5 ft 8 1/2 in)
- Hair color: Dark brown
- Eye color: Brown
- Agency: Ford Models (New York)

Patricia Carola Velásquez Semprún (born 31 January 1971) is a Venezuelan actress, model, public speaker, and philanthropist. She is best known for portraying Anck-su-namun in the 1999 film The Mummy and its 2001 sequel The Mummy Returns.

In addition to her work in film and fashion, Velásquez has participated in public speaking engagements at international forums and academic institutions, including TED-related events, focusing on topics such as leadership, authenticity, personal transformation and resilience.

In 2002, she founded the Wayuu Taya Foundation, a nonprofit organization dedicated to improving the living conditions of the Wayuu people and supporting sustainable community development while preserving cultural traditions.

== Early life ==
Velásquez was born in Maracaibo, Venezuela, the fifth of six children of a mestizo father and a mother of indigenous Wayuu heritage.

She is fluent in English, Spanish, French, and Italian.

== Career ==
=== Acting & modelling ===
From 1995 to 2000, Velásquez studied acting in Los Angeles and New York. She walked runways in ready-to-wear fashion shows for designers including Chanel, Chloé, John Galliano, Claude Montana, and Dolce & Gabbana, among others. Velásquez also appeared in print advertisements for Chanel's Allure, Monsoon, and Roberto Verino's Verino fragrance, among others.

During her modeling career, she appeared on the covers of magazines such as Vogue, Harper's Bazaar, and Marie Claire. She served as the face of CoverGirl for eight years, becoming the brand’s first Latin supermodel to transition into mainstream media.

Velásquez portrayed Meela Nais / Anck-Su-Namun in the 1999 film The Mummy and its 2001 sequel The Mummy Returns.

She made special appearances in music videos, including "Breaking the Girl" by Red Hot Chili Peppers, "Leave Virginia Alone" by Rod Stewart, "Para Llorar" by Ricardo Montaner, and "Spinning the Wheel" by George Michael.

In 2006, Velásquez was recognized for her debut stage performance in the lead role of School of the Americas at the Public Theater in New York City.

In 2012, she competed on behalf of her charity, the Wayúu Tayá Foundation, on the twelfth season of The Apprentice.

Velásquez played Begoña in several episodes of The L Word during its fifth season (2008). She had a recurring role as Marta Estrella on Arrested Development. On CSI: Miami, she guest-starred as Celia Gonzalez in the episode "From the Grave". She also had a recurring role as Nez in the first season of Rescue Me and guest appearances on Ugly Betty and Hawaii Five-0. Additionally, she voiced Marisol Díez Delgado in SSX Tricky and Unuratu in Shadow of the Tomb Raider.

In 2019, she played Patricia Alvarez in the horror film The Curse of La Llorona.

In 2020, Velásquez appeared as Nurse Velasquez in Malignant, Mariela Vicuna in Brut Force.

In 2024, she starred in the lead role of Maya, a film addressing human trafficking, directed by Julia Verdin. In 2025, she appeared in No Address, a film highlighting homelessness.

=== Philanthropy ===
In 2002, Velásquez founded The Wayuu Taya Foundation, a non‑profit organization dedicated to assisting the Wayuu, an indigenous people located in northwestern Venezuela and northern Colombia. In 2010, after the devastating Haiti earthquake, the Wayúu Tayá Foundation commissioned a special symbol of hope to raise funds for the victims of the earthquake, sold with the slogan *Keep the "H" Close to Your Heart—Help Haiti Hope*.

Velásquez was appointed a UNESCO Artist for Peace (Goodwill Ambassador) in June 2003, during the International Decade for the World's Indigenous People, in recognition of her work to protect the Wayúu indigenous people and safeguard their cultural heritage.

On August 30, 2018, the Organization of American States (OAS) appointed Velásquez as Goodwill Ambassador for the Rights of Indigenous Peoples of the Americas during a ceremony at its headquarters in Washington, D.C.

In 2024, Velásquez was featured in Time magazine.

=== Speaking ===
Velásquez has spoken at TED Conference, The Clinton Global Initiative, The Human Rights Campaign, and other venues.

== Awards ==
Velásquez was nominated for Best Supporting Actress at the 2022 Imagen Awards, for her role as Meg in List of a Lifetime.

In 2009, Velásquez received the Women Together Award at the United Nations, an event recognising individuals and institutions dedicated to creating a more equal society.

In 2015, the LA Femme Film Festival presented Velásquez with its Humanitarian Award for her philanthropic efforts.

In 2018, Velásquez was honored by the Human Rights Campaign with the Visibility Award in New England.

== Personal life ==
In February 2015, Velásquez released her memoir Straight Walk, recalling her journey from poverty to international acclaim, saying that she wanted to set an example of honesty for her daughter.

Velásquez is in a relationship with social venture philanthropist Alison Lawton.

== Filmography ==
=== Film ===
Year	Title	Role	Notes
1995	Unzipped	Herself	Documentary
1995	Catwalk	Herself	Documentary
1996	Le Jaguar	Maya	
1997	Eruption	Luisa Soares	
1999	Beowulf	Pendra	
1999	The Mummy	Anck-Su-Namun	
1999	No Vacancy	Ramona	
1999	Facade	Juanita	
2000	Committed	Carmen	
2000	Saint Bernard	Claudia	
2000	Turn It Up		
2001	The Mummy Returns	Meela Nais / Anck-Su-Namun	
2004	Mindhunters	Nicole Willis	
2004	Zapata: El sueño del héroe	Josefa	
2004	12 Days of Christmas Eve	Isobel Frias	
2011	Cenizas eternas	Ana	
2014	Liz in September	Liz	
2016	Guys Reading Poems	Mother	
2017	Little Heroes	Pilar	
2019	The Curse of La Llorona	Patricia Alvarez	
2021	Malignant	Nurse	
2021	Brut Force	Mariela Vicuña	
2021	List of a Lifetime	Meg	
2022	Free Dead or Alive	Soledad	
2022	Satanic Hispanics	Maribel	
2025	No Address	Gabrielle	

=== Television ===
Year	Title	Role	Notes
2001	Ed	Sonja Amata	Episode: "Closure"
2002	Fidel	Mirta Díaz-Balart	Television film
2002	E! Historias verdaderas: El peso de una corona	Herself	Television documentary
2002–2004	American Family	Adela / Elena	15 episodes
2003–2004	Arrested Development	Marta Estrella	5 episodes
2004	Rescue Me	Nez	2 episodes
2004	12 Days of Christmas Eve	Isobel Frias	Television film
2005	CSI: Miami	Celia Gonzalez	Episode: "From the Grave"
2008	The L Word	Begoña / Karina	5 episodes
2010	Ugly Betty	Victoria Velez	Episode: "Chica and the Man"
2011	Almighty Thor	Járnsaxa	Television film
2012	The Apprentice	Contestant	14 episodes
2019	Hawaii Five-0	Teresa Estrada	Episode: "Pupuhi Ka He'e O Kai Uli"

=== Video games ===
Year	Title	Role	Notes
2001	SSX Tricky	Marisol Diez Delgado	Voice
2018	Shadow of the Tomb Raider	Unuratu	Voice
