= Simón Bolívar Youth Symphonic Band =

Venezuelan youth wind band

- Youth orchestra
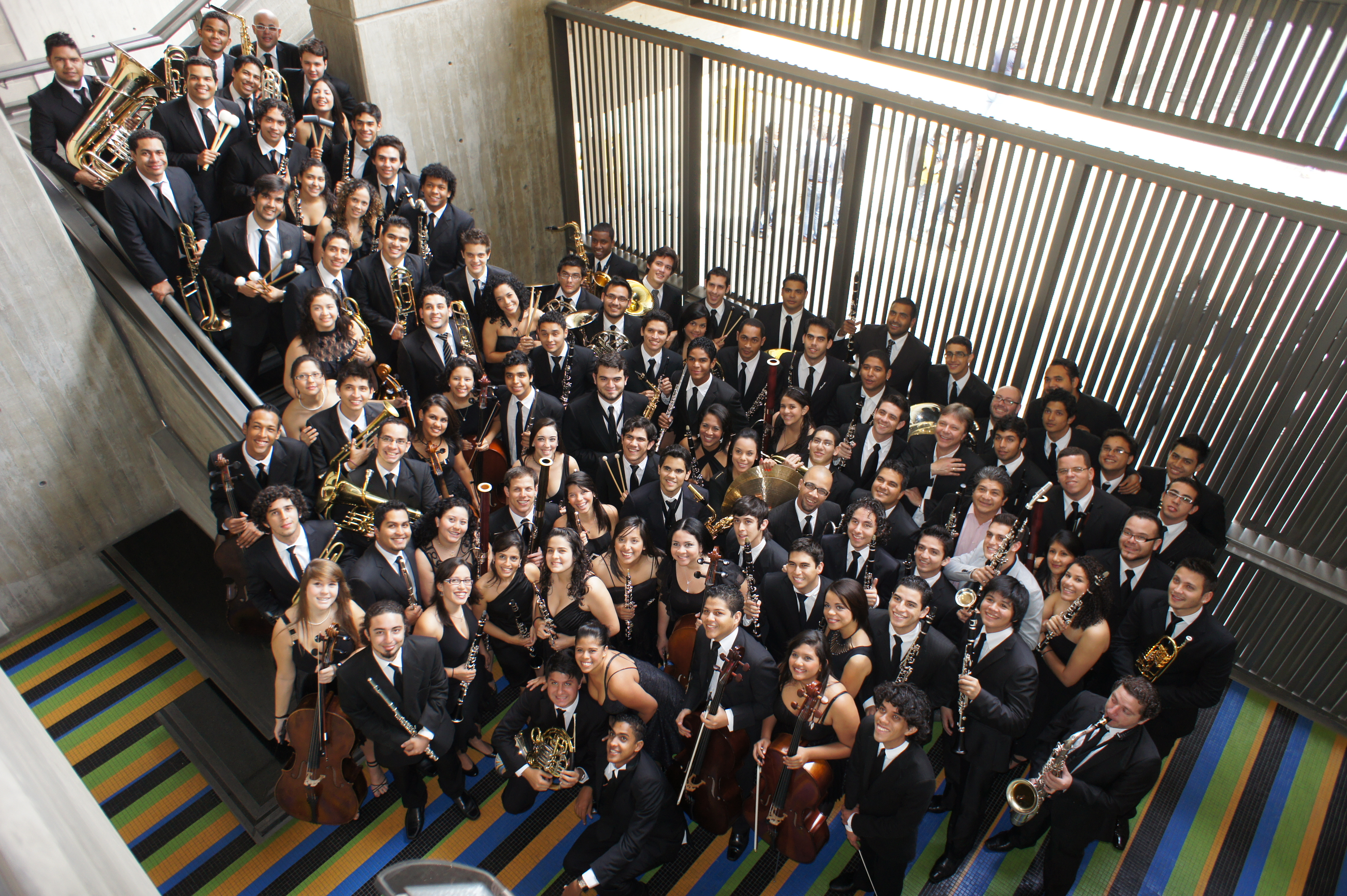
- Native name: Banda Sinfónica Juvenil Simón Bolívar
- Former name: Banda Sinfónica Juvenil de Caracas
- Founded: 2005
- Principal conductor: Sergio Rosales
- Website: Fundamusical - SBYSB

The Simón Bolívar Youth Symphonic Band (SBYSB) (Spanish: Banda Sinfónica Juvenil Simón Bolívar) is a wind band based in Caracas, Venezuela, and the principal youth music band of El Sistema. Since 2008, its principal conductor has been Sergio Rosales.

== History ==
The Simón Bolívar Youth Symphonic Band was founded in 2005 by the general director of the Simón Bolívar Music Conservatory, Valdemar Rodríguez, and Jesús Ignacio Perez Perazzo. The SBYSB is made up of students of the Simón Bolívar Music Conservatory and is part of the Academic Program of the National System of Youth and Children's Orchestras and Choirs of Venezuela, known as El Sistema.

The SBYSB has performed at renowned music venues in Venezuela, first under the command of founding conductor Jesús Ignacio Pérez Perazzo, and from 2008 under Sergio Rosales.

SBYSB guest conductors include Thomas Clamor (Germany), Antonio Saiote (Portugal), Eddy Vanoosthuyse (Belgium), Ferrer Ferran (Spain), Jan Van der Roost (Belgium), Jhonathan Cohler (United States), Johan de Meij (Netherlands) and Timothy Reynish (United Kingdom).

In 2012, the SBYSB went on a tour of Colombia that included appearances at the 3rd Medellín International Music Festival for Bands and the Auditorio León de Greiff of the Universidad Nacional de Colombia.

In 2013, the SBYSB released its first album, titled Mambos y Fanfarria!, with a concert at the National Center for Social Action for Music. The album was recorded under the German conductor Thomas Clamor, produced by GENUIN, and includes pieces by Ravel, Mendelssohn, and Mussorgsky, as well as by Latin American composers Castro D'Addona, Ginastera and Perez Prado.

In July 2013, the SBYSB undertook its first tour of Europe that included performances at festivals and venues in France, Belgium, Netherlands, Switzerland and Spain.

== Principal conductors ==
- Jesús Ignacio Perez Perazzo (2005–2008)
- Sergio Rosales (2008–present)

== Recordings ==
- Música del Templo y de la Plaza. (2007)
- Mambos y Fanfarria! (2013)
- El Coloso (2013)

== See also ==
- Orquesta Sinfónica Simón Bolívar
