= Victoria Sánchez (musician) =

Venezuelan conductor and pianist (born 1986)

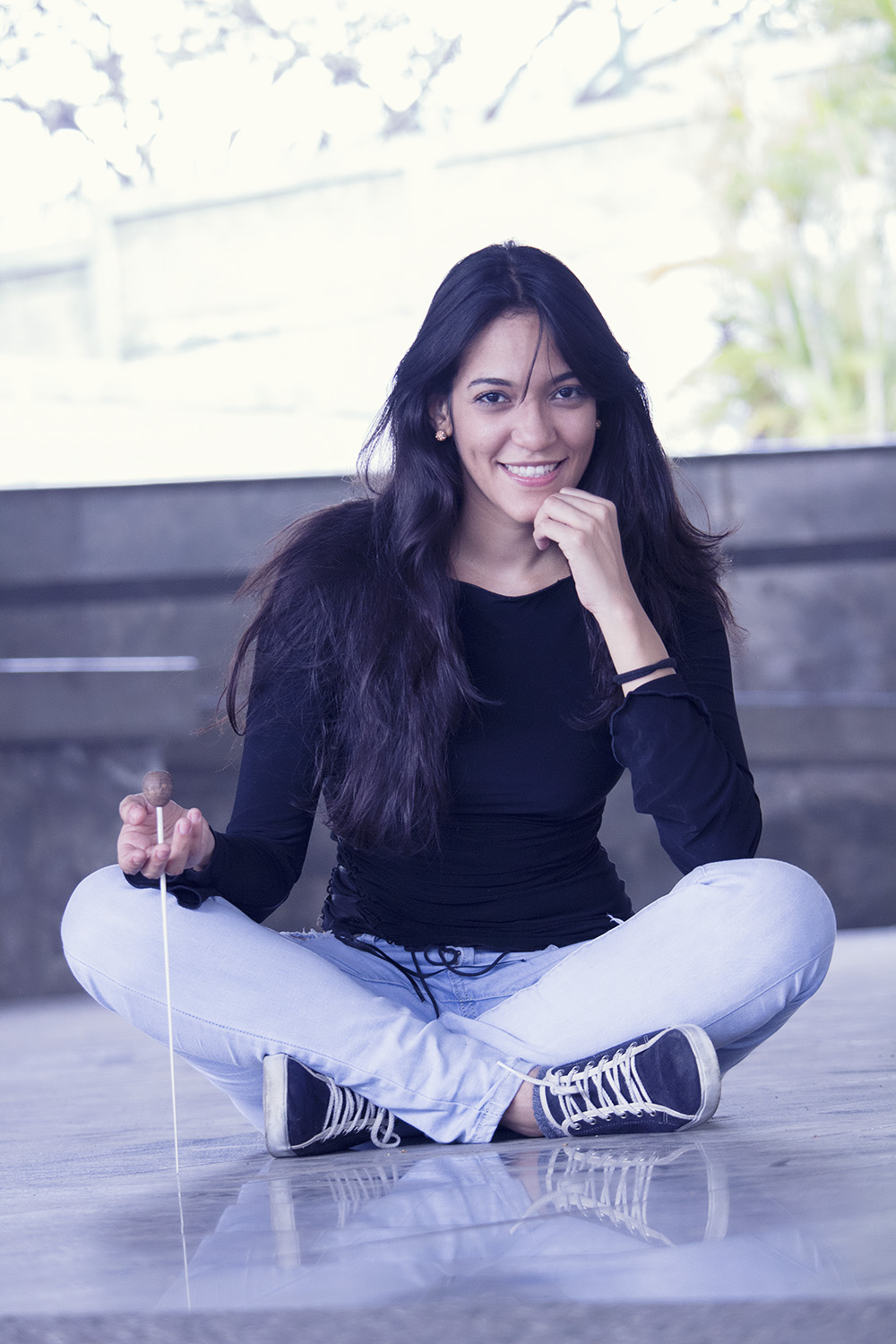

Background information
- Born: July 8, 1986 (age 40); Caracas, Distrito Capital, Venezuela
- Genre: Classical
- Occupations: Conductor, pianist, actress, singer
- Instrument: Piano

Victoria Sánchez (born July 8, 1986) is a Venezuelan conductor, actress, singer, and pianist from El Sistema of Venezuela. She is the music director and conductor of ALMAS, Sinfónica de Jóvenes Latinoamericanas.

== Biography ==
Sánchez began her musical studies at an early age in Caracas. She received training in piano, chamber music; and orchestral conducting under the guidance of conductors of international professionals, including harpsichord player, Abraham Abreu and Eduardo Marturet.

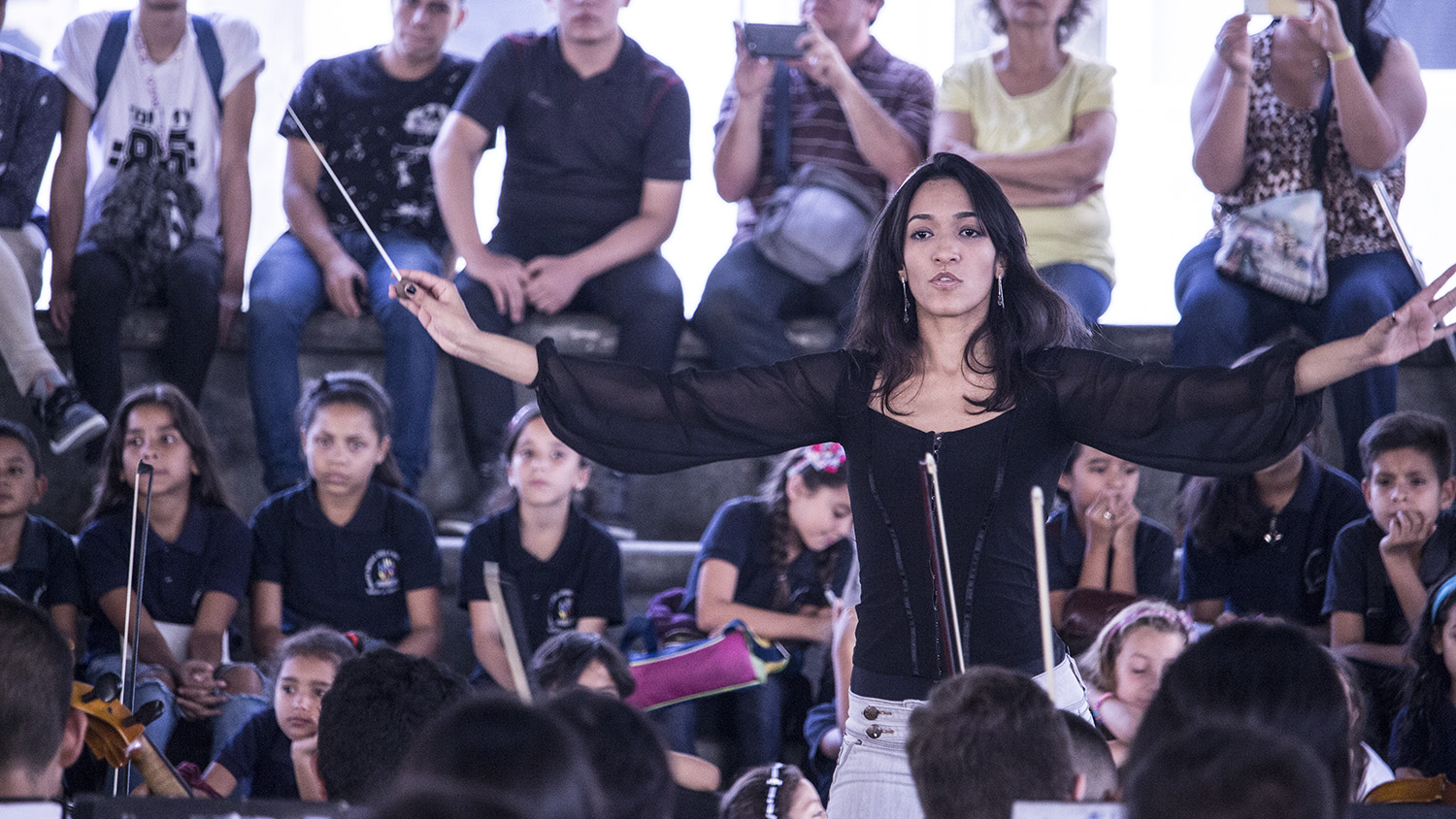
Victoria Sánchez Conducting in 2017

She played piano with the Simón Bolívar Symphony Orchestra, The Caracas Youth Symphony, and the Youth Symphony Orchestra Teresa Carreño, which have been conducted by musicians such as Ulyses Ascanio, Eduardo Marturet, Simon Rattle and Gustavo Dudamel, appearing on stage in countries such as Germany, Britain, Spain, and South Korea.

Since 2009, she worked with her mentor Maestro Eduardo Marturet with whom she has participated as an assistant in the recordings of the Symphonic Orchestras Simón Bolívar and Teresa Carreño for the CDs "Oblivion", "Apres un Reve" y "Salut d'Amour". She has also taken part in the production of the CD "An Evening in Vienna – LIVE!" by the Miami Symphony Orchestra.

She worked in the montage of concerts in Caracas, preparing repertoires with the Simón Bolívar Symphony Orchestra, The Caracas Youth Symphony and the Youth Symphony Orchestra Teresa Carreño. She has also directed orchestras such as the Youth Symphony Orchestra of Zulia Rafael Urdaneta, The Symphony of the Monagas Region, the Symphony of the Guárico state, the Sucre Symphony Orchestra, the Falcón Symphony Orchestra, the Youth Symphony of the City of Guayana, the Symphony of Miranda, the Yaracuy Symphony, the Barinas Symphony, the San Cristóbal Symphony, the Regional Youth Orchestra of Tachira State and the Simón Bolívar Symphony in Táchira.

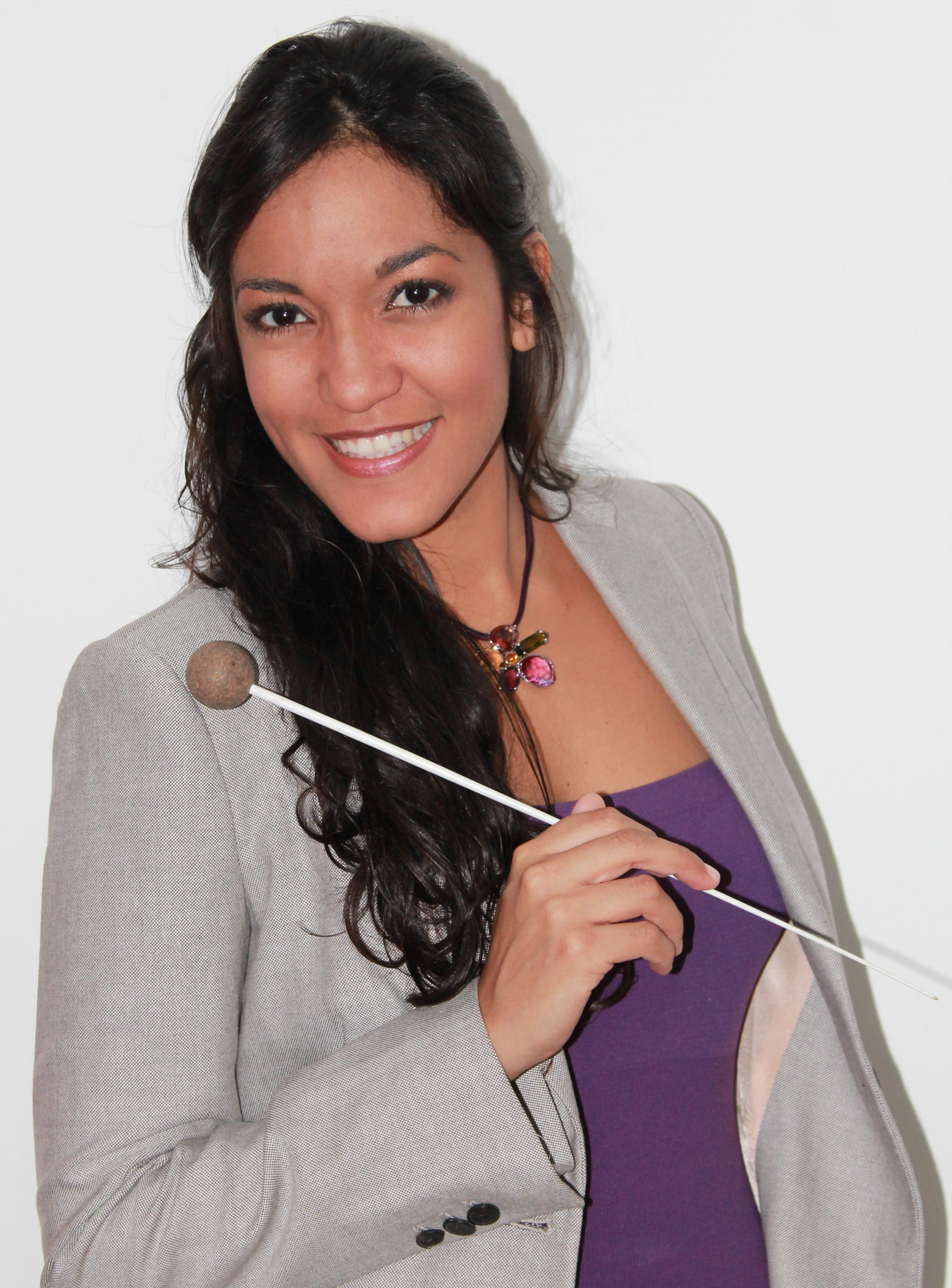
Victoria in 2012

Sanchez is part of the new edition of the book "Conductors of Venezuela". She studied acting with Maestro Antonio Cuevas, is a singer in the Victoria+Laurent Jazz Duo (with Laurent Lecuyer, Pianist) and has been recognized for promoting women's leadership in music.

== Orchestras conducted ==
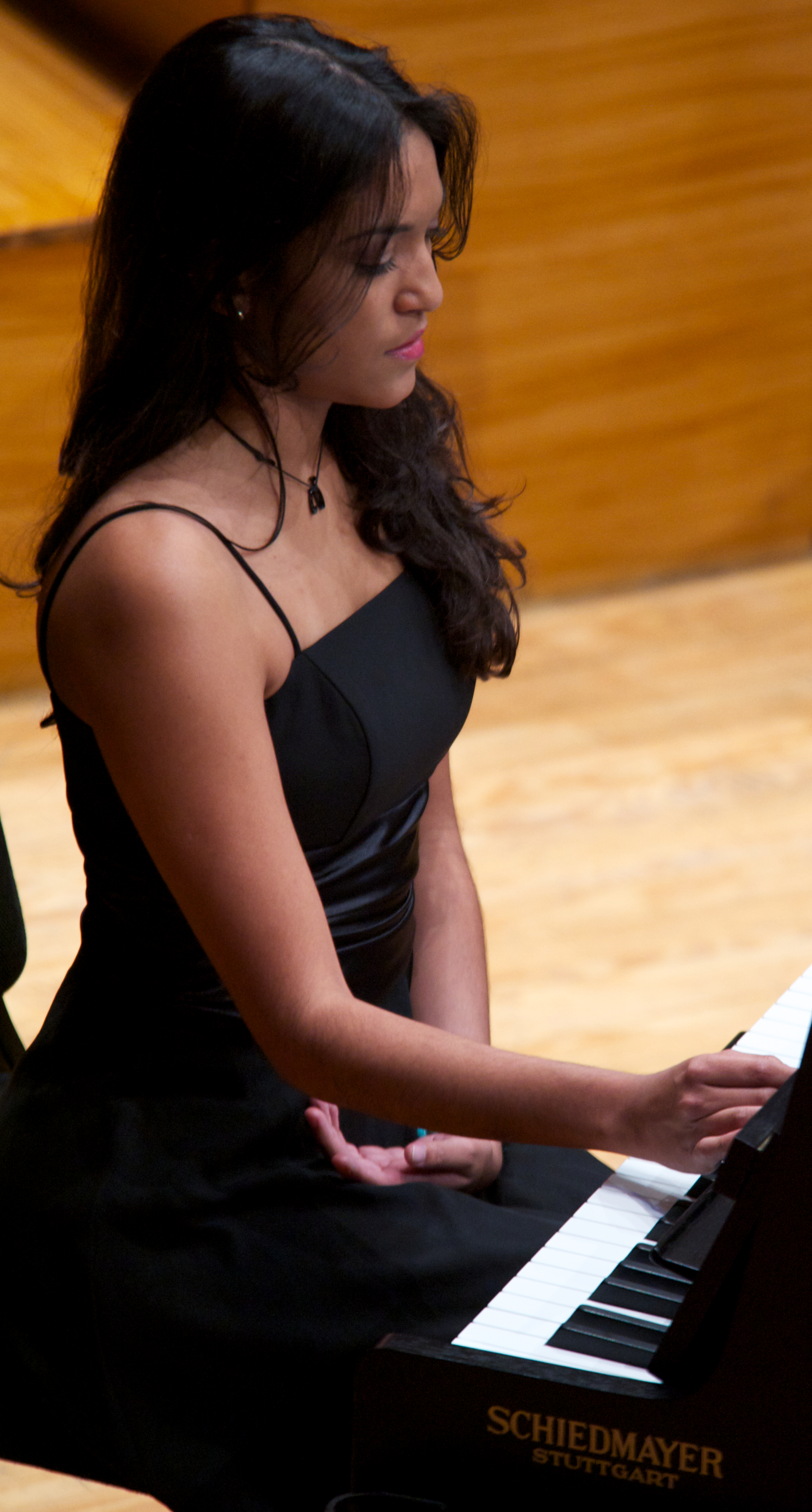
Victoria Sánchez Playing Piano in 2012

- Rafael Urdaneta Youth Orchestra of Zulia, Maracaibo, Venezuela.
- Symphony Orchestra of Monagas State, Venezuela.
- Ciudad Guayana Youth Symphony Orchestra, Puerto Ordaz, Venezuela.
- Symphony Orchestra of Miranda State, Venezuela.
- Symphony Orchestra of Yaracuy State, Venezuela.
- Simon Bolivar Symphony Orchestra of Tachira State, Venezuela.
- Barinas Youth Symphony Orchestra, Venezuela.
- Regional Youth Orchestra of Tachira State, Venezuela.
- Symphony Orchestra of Guarico State, Venezuela.
- Symphony orchestra of Sucre State, Venezuela.
- Symphony Orchestra of Falcon State, Venezuela.
- Carúpano Youth Symphony Orchestra, Sucre, Venezuela.
- La Vega Youth Symphony Orchestra, Caracas, Venezuela.
- Cantaura Youth Symphony Orchestra, Cantaura, Venezuela.
- Acarigua-Araure Youth Symphony Orchestra, Portuguesa, Venezuela.
- San Cristobal Youth Symphony Orchestra, Táchira, Venezuela.
- Innocente Carreño Youth Symphony Orchestra, Núcleo La Rinconada, Caracas, Venezuela.

As Assistant Conductor of Maestro Eduardo Marturet in Caracas:

- Teresa Carreño Youth Symphony Orchestra of Venezuela.
- Caracas Youth Orchestra.
- Simon Bolivar Symphony Orchestra of Venezuela.
- Simon Bolivar Big Band Jazz.

== Tours ==
2010, September–October. Europe Tour: As pianist of the Teresa Carreño Youth Symphony Orchestra.

- Beethovenhalle, Bonn, Germany.
- Vienna Konzerthaus, Austria.
- Philharmonie, Berlin, Germany.
- Concertgebouw, Amsterdam, the Netherlands.
- Auditorio Nacional, Madrid, Spain.
- Royal Festival Hall, London, Britain.

2011, May–June. Norway: As pianist of the Caracas Youth Orchestra.

- Norwegian Academy of Music, Oslo, Norway.
- Grieghallen-Festspillene, Bergen, Norway.

2011, October. Asia: As pianist of the Caracas Youth Orchestra.

- National Center of Performing Arts, Beijing, China.
- Seoul Arts Center, Korea.

2012, May–June. Europe: As pianist of the Caracas Youth Orchestra.

- Norwegian Academy of Music, Oslo, Norway.
- Grieghallen-Festspillene, Bergen, Norway.
- Hokksund Youth School, Norway.
- Drammen Theatre, Norway.
- Culture Center Moss, Norway.
- Auditorium of Maihaugen Museum, Lillerhammer, Norway.
- Auditorium of Hamar, Norway.
- Casa da Música. Porto, Portugal.
- Auditorium of Gulbenkian Fundación, Lisboa, Portugal.

2012 September–October. Europe Tour: As pianist of the Caracas Youth Orchestra.

- Belvedere di Villa Rufolo, Ravello, Italy.
- Mariinsky Concert Hall, St. Petersburg, Russia.
- Rudolfinum, Prague, Czech Republic.
- De Bijloke Concert Hall, Ghent, Belgium.
- Vienna Konzerthaus, Austria.
- Beethovenhalle, Bonn, Germany.

== Recordings ==
Credits as Assistant of Music Director:

- An Evening in Vienna. Live!
- Oblivion.
- Aprés Un Reve.
- Salut D'amour.

== Acting ==
- Chicago (Directed by Luis Fernandez) Rios Reyna Hall, Teresa Carreño Cultural Complex, 2013. LAZO Productions.
- La Vida en un Bolero (Written by Luis Carlos Boffill) Gastón Luzardo Hall, Central Bank of Venezuela, 2014.
- Sin Palabras (Directed by Antonio Cuevas) Alberto de Paz & Mateos Theatre, 2014. Best Actress Award.
- Desencuentros (Directed by Antonio Cuevas) Alberto de Paz & Mateos Theatre, 2014. Best Actress Award.

== Sources ==
- Victoria Sánchez, Directora de Orquesta de Venezuela para el mundo
- Victoria Sánchez dirige a la Orquesta Sinfónica Juvenil Inocente Carreño
- The Typewriter de Leroy Anderson conducida por Victoria Sánchez
- 5° Sinfonía de Beethoven – 4° movimiento con la Orquesta Sinfónica Juvenil Inocente Carreño
- Victoria Sánchez y la III Gala Sinfónica de la Guitarra en Monagas
- Victoria Sánchez y la Sinfónica Juvenil Regional del Estado Sucre
- La "Resurrección" de Mahler con Victoria Sánchez y la Juvenil de San Sebastián de los Reyes
- El Aula Magna de la ULA recibe a Victoria Sánchez y Miguel Sánchez
- Victoria Sánchez conduce a la Juvenil de Carúpano
- Miguel Sánchez interpreta "Colors for Trombone" bajo la batuta de Victoria Sánchez
- Video – Victoria Sánchez conduciendo a la Orquesta Sinfónica Simón Bolívar de Venezuela
- Victoria Sánchez conduce la Orquesta Sinfónica de las ciudades hermanas Acarigua y Araure
- Victoria Sánchez, una batuta con nombre de mujer
- La Batuta Silenciosa de las Mujeres
- La Fuerza de la Batuta Femenina
- Monagas rinde homenaje a Antonio Lauro
- VIII Seminario Internacional Portuguesa 2015
- La Fuerza acompañó a la Sinfónica Juvenil Regional de Mérida en el Aula Magna de la ULA
- 2 Jóvenes promesas se presentan en el Teatro Armonía de Coro
