= Sergio Rosales =

Venezuelan conductor (born 1988)

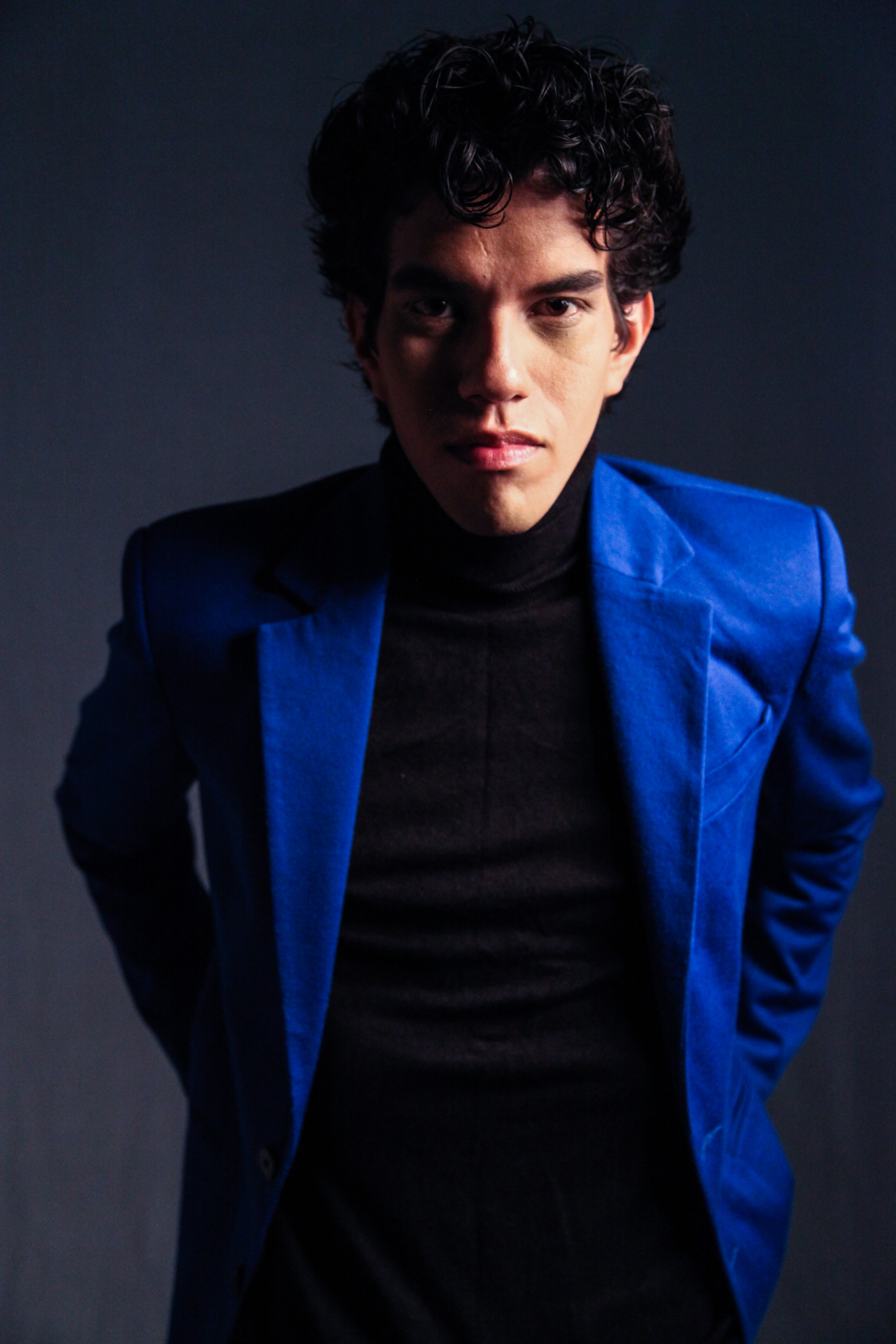

Background information
- Born: Sergio Luis Rosales Archila; February 19, 1988 (age 38); Maracay, Aragua, Venezuela
- Genres: Classical
- Occupation: conductor
- Instrument: Violin
- Years active: 2008–present
- Member of: Simon Bolivar Youth Symphonic Band
- Website: Sergio Rosales - Fundamusical

Sergio Rosales (born February 19, 1988) is a Venezuelan conductor. He formed the El Sistema and is the music director of the Simon Bolivar Youth Symphonic Band.

== Life and career ==
=== Early life ===
Rosales was born in Maracay, Venezuela. He began his music studies at the age of 9 at the ”Escuela Integral para las Artes Judith Jaimes” of San Cristóbal, Táchira. In 1999, he entered the “National System of Youth and Children Orchestras and Choirs of Venezuela”, where he joined to the “Táchira Children's Orchestra” as violin player.

At the age of 16 he moved to Caracas and began to study orchestral conducting at the “Instituto Universitario de Estudios Musicales” IUDEM (University Institute of Musical Studies) with Venezuelan maestros as Alfredo Rugeles and Rodolfo Saglimbeni. Between 2004 and 2008, he studied orchestral conducting with Sung Kwak, Wolfgang Trommer, Collin Meters, Helmuth Rilling, Mario Benzecry, Rubén Capriles and Francisco Noya. During that period he served as assistant conductor of the “Orquesta Sinfónica Municipal de Caracas” and the “Orquesta Gran Mariscal de Ayacucho” with maestro Rodolfo Saglimbeni. In August 2008, Rosales attended the George Hurst Conductors’ Course at the Canford Summer School of Music in England.

=== Conducting career ===
In 2008, he was appointed music director of the ”Simon Bolivar Youth Symphony Band of Venezuela” (SBYSBV) replacing maestro Jesús Ignacio Pérez Perazzo, shortly after he starts his orchestral conducting lessons with maestro José Antonio Abreu.

In 2010, Maestro José Antonio Abreu, appointed him as a music director of the ”Simon Bolivar Music Conservatory Youth Symphony Orchestra”.

In 2012, Rosales was invited to conduct the Brussels Chamber Soloists at the Benelux Clarinet Competition, in Kortrijk, Belgium.

In June 2012, Rosales went on a tour of Colombia with the SBYSBV, which included appearances at the 3rd Medellín International Music Festival for Bands and the Auditorio León de Greiff of the ”Universidad Nacional de Colombia” in Bogotá.

In July 2013, he conducts the SBYSB on his first European tour of five countries of the old continent - France, Belgium, Switzerland, the Netherlands and Spain, offering concerts in prestigious venues and participating in large bands festivals, highlighting the "World Music Contest" in Kerkrade-Netherlands and the "International Competition of Bands" city of Valencia in Spain.

In June 2015, assumed the commitment to record the Concerto for Clarinet Jan van der Roost, with renowned clarinetist Eddy Vanoosthuyse and the ”Central Aichi Symphony Orchestra” in the city of Nagoya, Japan. Where he also performed the Asian premiere of the concert.

In 2016, made his debut in the United States of America conducting the ”Virginia Wind Symphony” in Norfolk, Virginia.
