= Giancarlo Castro D'Addona =

Venezuelan-Italian composer (born 1980)

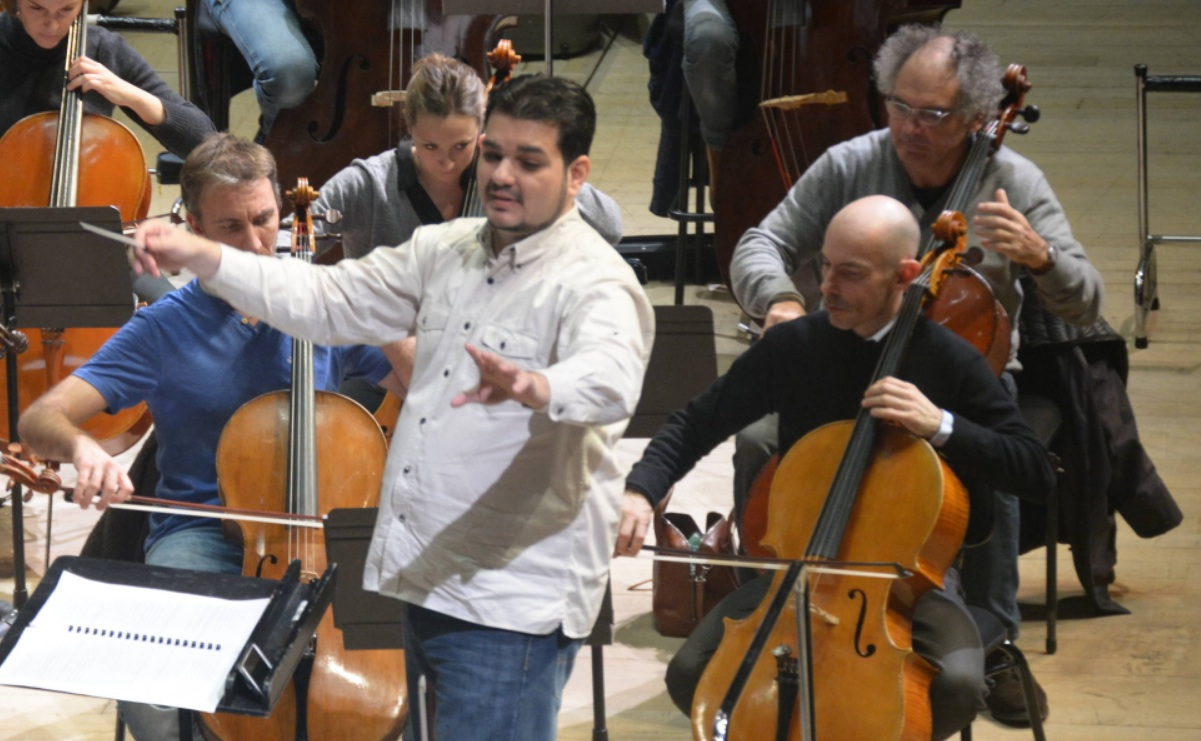
- Giancarlo Castro D'Addona at the Radio France Theatre

Background information
- Born: August 8, 1980 (age 46); Venezuela
- Occupations: Composer and Conductor
- Instrument: Trumpet
- Website: www.giancarlocastro.com

Giancarlo Castro D'Addona (born August 8, 1980) is a Venezuelan – Italian composer, conductor and trumpet player. Gold medal winner at the Global Music Awards in San Diego – California (US).

== Music career ==
Castro D'Addona began his music studies aged 8 at the Vicente Emilio Sojo Conservatory in Barquisimeto. In his career, he has been a member of the most significant groups of El Sistema founded by José Antonio Abreu, such as the Simón Bolívar Youth Orchestra, the Simón Bolívar Brass Quintet and the Simón Bolívar Brass Ensemble, with which he has undertaken numerous concert tours in America, Europe and Asia, and obtaining diverse recognitions, including awards, sponsorships, representation by international artistic agencies like Askonas Holt (England), Kajimoto (Japan), Sony Music Foundation (Japan), and taking part in recordings for the Deutsche Grammophon, EMI Classics and EUROARTS labels.

As a conductor, he has performed with a variety of orchestras and chamber groups such as the Lara Symphony Orchestra (Barquisimeto), the Simón Bolívar Big Band Jazz (Caracas), the Barquisimeto Youth Orchestra, the Chacao Youth Orchestra (Caracas), the Manizales Walking Jazz Band (Colombia), and the Simón Bolívar Youth Orchestra.

== Composer career ==
In 2004, Castro began his composition studies with the Colombian teacher Blas Emilio Atehortúa. Influenced by Latin American music, jazz and film scores, he wrote his first works in that year, which saw the completion of "Grand Fanfare", which was recorded on the album We Got Rhythm on the EMI Classics label, and the albums Gran Fanfare and Mambo! Live From Caracas, both of which appeared on the EUROARTS label. In 2012, his work was recorded by the Simón Bolívar Youth Band of Venezuela on the GENUIN Classics label (Germany). In that same year, together with the works "Arrival of a Noble Maestro" and "Walking Faster", it was performed by the Venezuelan Brass Ensemble at the Bergen International Festival (Norway) and Carnegie Hall in New York.

In 2007, Castro composed the soundtrack for the Web drama series "Maleficio", the first of its kind in Venezuela, which was created by the Caicedo brothers for Taurus Productions.

In 2010, saw the premiere in Finland of his concerto for violin and string orchestra titled "Concierto Sureño", which was commissioned by Laurentius Dinca, a violinist of the Berlin Philharmonic Orchestra.

In 2013, he composed "Rhapsody for Talents", a work commissioned by the French instrument maker Buffet Crampon to commemorate the manufacturer's history constructing, making and selling wind instruments. Its world premiere was performed by the Simón Bolívar Youth Symphonic Band of Venezuela, conducted by Sergio Rosales in the Théâtre du Châtelet (Paris, France) on 7 July 2013.

In 2015, Castro composed the soundtrack of the Venezuelan film "Redención". In November of that year he was invited by the Buffet Group to conduct his work "Rhapsody for Talents" with the Paris Symphonic Orchestra at the Radio France Theatre (Paris, France) to celebrate the 190th anniversary of the company. This made Castro the first Venezuelan composer to conduct his own work in an internationally famous venue.

In 2016, his concerto for clarinet was performed in Melk Abbey in Austria as part of the Salzburg Festival. On December of this same year, he became a gold medal winner for his work "Rhapsody for Talents" in the category Original Score and Composition / Composer at the Global Music Awards in San Diego, California.

In 2017 he moved to the United States to develop his musical career, this year his piece "Grand Fanfare" was performed by The President's Own United States Marine Band in the U.S. Capitol in Washington, D.C., conducted by Colonel Jason K. Fettig, his Concerto for Tuba was performed by Carol Jantsch, principal tuba of the Philadelphia Orchestra at the Berkshire Summer Music Summer Festival and Interlochen Center for the Arts, Castro was invited as a guest composer and conductor by the University of Minnesota Duluth Department to offer lectures of his works and conduct the Senior High School Honor Band Festival and the Twin Ports Wind Orchestra in the Weber Music Hall.

In December he traveled to France to participate as guest conductor of the Orchestra Valentiana with a repertoire that included his concerto for violin and string orchestra "Concierto Sureño" performed by Marie-Francoise Pallot, currently professor of violin at the Boulogne-Billancourt Conservatory; also in this same opportunity Castro conducted the world premiere of his concerto for saxophone and orchestra in the Saint-Nicolas Auditorium of Valenciennes performed by Buffet Crampon Artist Michel Supera.

In 2018 his work Melk Abbey was included in the new recording production of the Ensemble 7/4 of Venezuela in his album Festfanfaren recorded in Melk Abbey in Austria. Also his work "Walking Faster" was recorded by the European Brass Ensemble in the production Diversity under GENUIN Classics Label conducted by Thomas Clamor, this same year the Banda Municipal de València performed his work "Rhapsody for Talents" in the Palau de la Música de València in Spain at the closing ceremony of the International Music Band Contest "Ciutat de València" 2018.

In February 2019 his work "Euphantasy" for Euphonium and Band was released and recorded by the French soloist Bastien Baumet and the Portugal Air force Band in the production "Radiance". In May 2019, his "Sonatina" for Tuba was premiered by Carol Jantsch in the International Tuba and Euphonium Association 2019, and his concert for violin and string orchestra "Concierto Sureño" was premiered in Portland by Venezuelan violinist Inés Voglar Belgique and the string ensemble of Portland Youth Philharmonic conducted by David Hattner.

In September 2019 Giancarlo became the conductor of the Reed College orchestra being the first Latin American conductor to obtain this position.

Currently his works continue to be performed all over the world by groups such as l’Orchestre Symphonique d’Orléans in France, the Peter Mayr Pfeffersberg Band in Austria, the Faculty of Brass and Percussion Ensemble of Interlochen Center for the Arts in Michigan, Le Grand Ensemble de Cuivres et Percussions du Conservatoire in France, the Royal Academy of Music Symphonic Brass in London, Giovanile Sinfonica Band Trentino in Italy, Boston Conservatory Brass Ensemble, among others.

Giancarlo Castro D'Addona's publisher is Editions BIM (Switzerland). SUISA, an association representing authors based in Zurich, Switzerland, safeguards his creators rights. Castro is also an artist for STOMVI, a manufacturer of brass instruments.

== Compositions ==
=== Works for Piano ===
- 5 Preludes for piano Op. 1–5

=== Works for Violin Solo ===
- "Estudio contemporáneo a la Danza" Op. 23

=== Works for Strings Ensemble ===
- Concierto Sureño, for violin solo & strings ensemble. Op. 21

=== Chamber music ===
- Trumpet Quartet Op. 6
- Stories of a Legend for brass quintet Op. 8
- "Ida y vuelta en Fa" for trombone quartet Op. 10
- Besos Clandestinos, for oboe, piano, bass & drum set. Op. 13
- Swing Sonata, for trumpet, piano, bass & drum set. Op. 15
- Swing Sonata, for trombone, piano, bass & drum set. Op. 15a
- Trumpetbone, for trumpet, bass trombone, piano, bass & drum set. Op. 16
- "Cardenal Pintao", for clarinet, piano, bass & drum set. (optional cuatro y maracas). Op. 17
- "Tuna y Cuji", for violin, piano, bass & drum set. Op. 18
- "Mi lugar", for vibraphone, guitar & bass. Op. 20
- "Q’Situacion", for trombone ensemble. Op. 22

=== Music for Brass Ensemble ===
- Grand Fanfare Op. 7
- Arrival of a Noble Maestro Op. 11
- Tuba Concert Op. 12
- Walking Faster Op. 19
- "Grande Maurice" Fanfare, for 24 trumpets & percussion. Op. 24

=== Works for Brass Band ===
- Grand Fanfare Op. 7c

=== Works for Symphonic Band ===
- Grand Fanfare Op. 7a
- Rhapsody for Talents Op. 26

=== Works for Wind Band ===
- Grand Fanfare Op. 7a
- Rhapsody for Talents Op. 26
- Euphantasy
- Journey

=== Works for Big Band ===
- Clarinet and Big Band concerto Op. 9

=== Works for Orchestra ===
- Grand Fanfare Op. 7b
- Chacao Police Academy Anthem Op. 14
- Stunning Trumpet Trumpet Concert Op. 25,
- Rhapsody for Talents Op. 26a
- Clarinet and Big Band concerto Op. 9a

=== Soundtracks ===
- Maleficio, Web Serie. (2008)
- Redención, Venezuelan Film. (2015)
