= El Sistema =

Venezuelan music education program

National Network of Youth and Children Orchestras of Venezuela
- Formation: 1975
- Founder: José Antonio Abreu
- Type: non-profit
- Purpose: Music education
- Location: Caracas, Venezuela
- Website: FESNOJIV official site

El Sistema (The System), officially National Network of Youth and Children Orchestras of Venezuela is a publicly financed, voluntary sector music-education program, founded in Venezuela in 1975 by Venezuelan educator, musician, and activist José Antonio Abreu. The curriculum is built on the belief that the collective playing of music, especially orchestral and choral, fosters discipline, teamwork, and social integration.

The program has a reputation for rescuing young people in impoverished circumstances, directing them away from lives of drug abuse and crime, into which they would possibly otherwise be drawn. El Sistema has inspired similar programmes in more than 60 other countries.

By 2015, according to official figures, El Sistema included more than 400 music centers and 700,000 young musicians.

== Origin and history ==
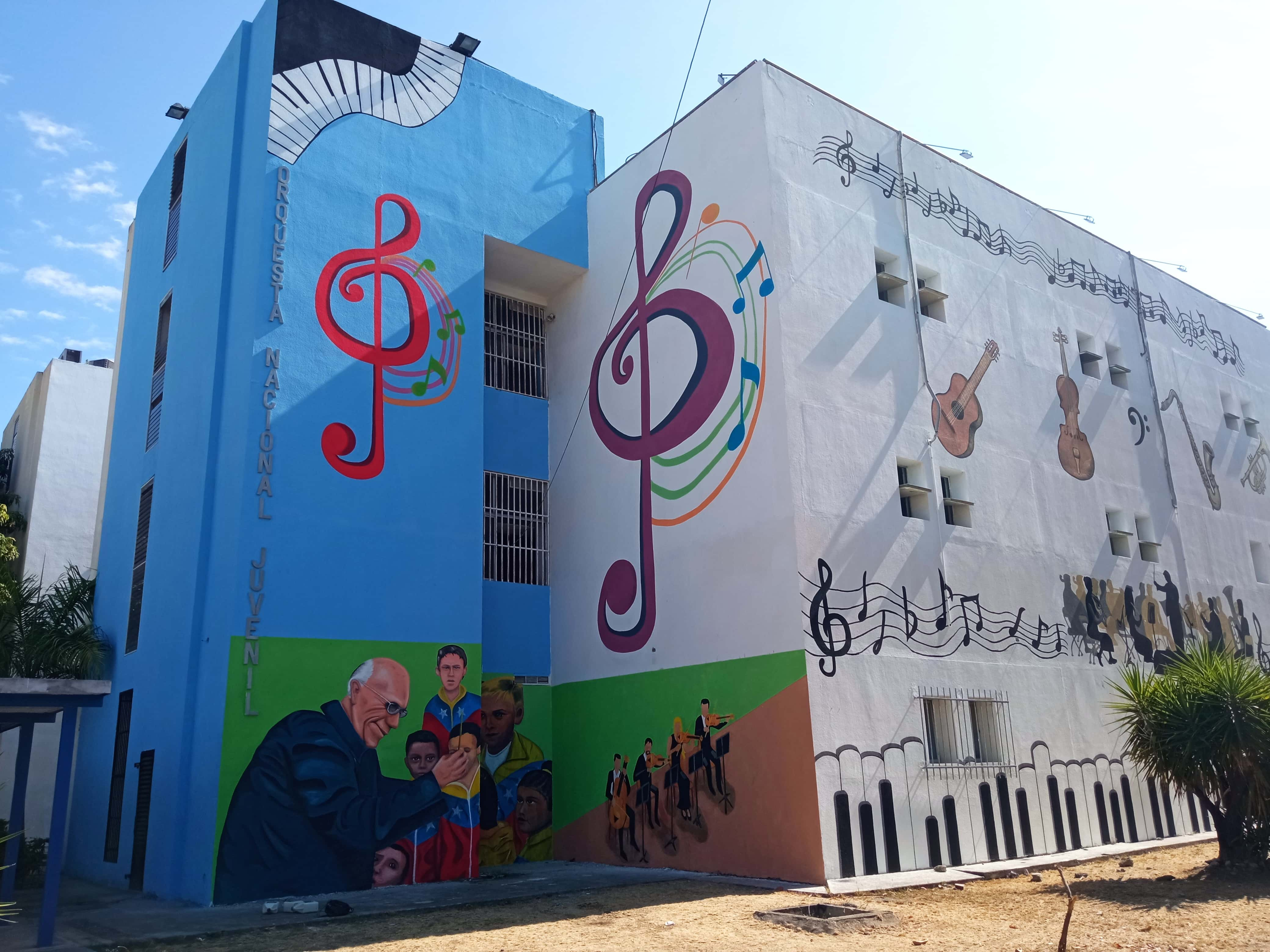
Music center of El Sistema in Maracay, Venezuela

El Sistema began under the leadership of José Antonio Abreu (7 May 1939 – 24 March 2018) with 11 students in an underground parking garage. For many years, its official name was Fundación del Estado para el Sistema Nacional de las Orquestas Juveniles e Infantiles de Venezuela, (FESNOJIV), translated into English as "National Network of Youth and Children Orchestras of Venezuela." The organizations has since changed its name to Fundación Musical Simón Bolívar (FMSB), but is still widely known by the FESNOJIV acronym.

=== Abreu's vision ===
Abreu said that "music has to be recognized as an agent of social development in the highest sense because it transmits the highest values – solidarity, harmony, mutual compassion," crediting it with the ability to "unite an entire community and express sublime feelings." Thus, children begin playing in groups the moment they pick up an instrument. This instant immersion is the most remarkable feature of their music education system. Students are learning to be part of a group and discover music at the same time. The original program involves four after-school hours of musical training and rehearsal each week, plus additional work on the weekends. El Sistema-inspired programs provide what the International Journal of Applied Psychoanalytic Studies describes as "free classical music education that promotes human opportunity and development for impoverished children."

Abreu received the National Music Prize for his work in 1979 and became Minister of Culture in 1983. In 1995, Abreu was appointed Special Ambassador for the Development of a Global Network of Youth and Children Orchestras and Choirs by UNESCO. He also became a special representative for the development of orchestras within the framework of UNESCO's "World Movement of Youth and Children Orchestras and Choirs."

Abreu led the program for nearly four decades with the backing and material support of seven consecutive Venezuelan governments, ranging across the political spectrum from center-right to the leftist presidency of Nicolás Maduro. Abreu has been "careful to keep El Sistema separate from partisan politics".

=== Play and fight ===
Since 1975, "Tocar y Luchar" (Play and Fight) has been the motto of El Sistema and its nationwide system of youth orchestras. Referring to the many challenges during the early phases of the program, it expresses its members' determination and commitment to El Sistema as a vital and critical project, both musically and socially.

=== Venezuelan government involvement ===
The Venezuelan government of President Carlos Andrés Pérez began fully financing Abreu's orchestra after its success, in 1976, at the "International Festival of Youth Orchestras" in Aberdeen, Scotland. From the beginning, El Sistema came not under the ministry of culture, but under the umbrella of social-services ministries, which has strategically helped it survive. The current Maduro administration has been El Sistema's most generous patron so far, covering almost its entire annual operating budget, as well as additional capital projects.

At the time, its network of 102 youth and 55 children's orchestras (including approximately 100,000 youngsters) came under the supervision of the Ministry of Family, Health and Sports. A goal of El Sistema is to use music for the protection of children through training, rehabilitation, and prevention of criminal behavior.

In September 2007, with Abreu present on the television talk-show, Aló Presidente, Hugo Chávez announced a new government program, Misión Música, designed to provide tuition and music instruments to Venezuelan children. It has been noted that "various ministries oversaw El Sistema until two years ago, when the president's office took direct control. El Sistema's mission runs parallel to Mr. Chávez's program to provide subsidies and services to the poor."

The institution's closeness to the government has caused the perception that the institution and the orchestra serve as a propaganda instrument of Nicolás Maduro's government.

=== The National Center for Social Action for Music ===
Since 2011, El Sistema has operated in the National Center for Social Action for Music in Caracas, a modern structure that has various spaces distributed in musical instruction areas, instrumental rehearsal and choral practice rooms; in addition to a library, recording booths, dressing rooms, cafeterias, administrative and health services. Among the areas open to the public, the large Simón Bolívar Room stands out, with a capacity of 1,100 people and equipped with a large tubular organ donated by the Polar Foundation; in addition to a theater, chamber music rooms and an outdoor acoustic shell, located in the southern area of the building, which is part of Los Caobos Park; as well as musical instrument manufacturing workshops and a space for the "Inocente Carreño" National Audiovisual Music Center (CNAMIC)

=== Spread of regional centres in Venezuela ===
On 6 June 2007, the Inter-American Development Bank announced a US$150 million loan for the construction of seven regional centers of El Sistema throughout Venezuela. Many bankers within the IDB originally objected to the loan on the grounds that classical music is for the elite. But then the bank has conducted studies on the more than 2,000,000 young people, educated in El Sistema, linking participation in the program to improvements in school attendance and reduction in juvenile delinquency and crime rates. Weighing such benefits, the bank calculated that every dollar invested in El Sistema was reaping about $1.68 in social dividends. Supported by the government, El Sistema started introducing its music program into the public-school curriculum, aiming to be in every school and to support 500,000 children by 2015.

A 2022 investigation by investigative platform Connectas, with the help of the International Center for Journalists, concluded that the regional centers funded by the IDB were never built and the bank's long-term project to decentralize El Sistema had failed.

=== Simon Bolivar Orchestra ===
Simon Bolivar Children Orchestra in Maracaibo, Zulia State

An important product of El Sistema is the Simon Bolivar Symphony Orchestra. In the mid-1990s, Abreu formed the National Children's Youth Orchestra, and many young musicians graduated from it to the Simón Bolívar which grew considerably in size. This became an opportunity to re-create the ensemble as two separate performing entities. The first generation of members was designated the Simón Bolívar A; the younger, newer members, who had recently been brought in from the new National Children's Orchestra, now constituted the Simón Bolívar B" The Simón Bolívar B is now the touring orchestra and, in 2007, made its debut at the BBC Proms in London's Royal Albert Hall and later at Carnegie Hall under the baton of Gustavo Dudamel, receiving enthusiastic reviews. 2009 saw the orchestra touring in the US, but also in Europe as well.

In the spring of 2010, however, a tour to the Lucerne Easter Festival drew comments from reviewers, such as Tom Service of London's The Guardian, that the Simón Bolívar Youth Orchestra was "youthful no longer." This struck home, and Abreu decided, as he put it, "the time is once again ripe for new, younger national orchestras." And so, he set about creating new ensembles. The Teresa Carreño Symphony Youth Orchestra, named after the famous Venezuelan pianist, started international touring in the autumn of 2010 with appearances at the Beethovenfest in Bonn, followed by Vienna, Berlin, Salzburg Festival, Milan, Amsterdam, Madrid, and London. Other new youth orchestras include the Caracas Symphony Youth Orchestra and a newly constituted National Children's Orchestra consisting of 358 musicians.

=== 2017 protests ===
On 3 May 2017, 18-year-old El Sistema violist Armando Cañizales was killed when he was shot by a spherical metallic projectile by security forces while participating in a demonstration in Caracas. Conductor Gustavo Dudamel condemned Nicolás Maduro's response to the protests for the first time the day after the killing, writing in social media: "I raise my voice against violence and repression. Nothing can justify bloodshed. Enough of ignoring the just clamor of a people suffocated by an intolerable crisis."

Violinist Wuilly Arteaga participated in the protests and played his instrument. On 24 May, a National Guardsman officer ripped and broke Arteaga's violin. His images crying over the violin went viral, and several people offered to give him a violin to replace the broken one, including singers Oscarcito, Chyno Miranda and Marc Anthony, flutist Huáscar Barradas and former baseball player Melvin Mora.

Arteaga was imprisoned in July for 19 days on charges of public instigation and possession of incendiary substance. During his detention he was transferred four times and subjected to torture. When he was arrested, security forces burned his hair with a lighter for having very long hair. He was beaten with sticks and helmets when he was transferred to Fort Tiuna, and before arriving at the last prison, he was hit in the back of the head with a metal tube, causing him internal bleeding and leaving him deaf in his right ear. During his detention he denounced that he witnessed how they raped a young woman detained on top of him inside an armoured vehicle.

As he had no violin in prison, Arteaga decided to sing, with other prisoners asking him for songs, especially vallenatos. He spent most of his prison time in an octagonal cell in the General Command of the National Guard in Caracas, where there were about 14 prisoners. In prison he had no possibility to write, as it was forbidden to receive or send letters, there were no visitors, and the prisoners were isolated and without ventilation. Even so, Arteaga composed the song "Cárcel de libertad" (Freedom Prison) along with his best friend Aarón, who had also been detained.

Clarinetist Karen Palacios signed in favor of the referendum organized by the opposition led National Assembly. She was later notified that her contract with the Philharmonic Orchestra was canceled because her political position was not convenient for the orchestra. Palacios denounced the incident on her Twitter account and it went viral. The clarinetist started to receive attacks and threats on social networks and during that year's protests her tweets began to be cited, where she expressed anger at the situation and at the abuse of the security forces. Later, on 1 June 2019, Karen would be detained by officials from the Directorate General of Military Counterintelligence (DGCIM) and charged with the crime of instigation to hatred. She was detained in the National Institute for Female Orientation (INOF), in Los Teques, Miranda state, and confined to a highly dangerous cell, despite having a release order dated from 18 June. In court, her mother was asked not to make her daughter's case public because "it was going to be resolved soon." Palacios was released on 16 July 2019.

=== Criticism ===
In November 2014, British musicologist Geoffrey Baker published a newspaper article and a book that disputed many of the claims made by and about El Sistema and suggested that much of the publicly circulating information about the program was hyperbolic or false. The book's allegations included a culture of authoritarianism, hyper-discipline, exploitation, competition, and gender discrimination. It argued that the program was deeply conservative beneath its progressive exterior and that its claims of social transformation were unproven and exaggerated.

In his review of Baker's book, Damian Thompson, arts editor of The Spectator, picked up Baker's view that the alleged sexual abuse of young musicians in El Sistema was part of "classical music's dirty little secret" that also existed in other musical institutions. In 2021 the Caracas Chronicles reported several instances of sexual misconduct and abuse denounced in the Venezuelan MeToo movement.

Baker's research was supported in a 2016 article by Lawrence Scripp in which he interviewed the Venezuelan violinist Luigi Mazzocchi, who studied for 15 years at El Sistema starting at age nine. In 2018, Baker analysed external evaluations of El Sistema dating from 1996 to 1997, and concluded they confirmed many of the issues he had reported earlier.

Baker and William Cheng published an opinion piece in the Washington Post in 2021, in which they said a number of former students at El Sistema had told them that there was underage sex between students and teachers, "sexualized grooming" and "trad[ing] [of] musical benefits ... for sex" at the institution. Overseas affiliates of El Sistema in England and Canada expressed concern at the allegations in the Washington Post article. El Sistema expressed "absolute solidarity with the victims and their families" and said it would ask the Public Prosecutor's Office "to support opening investigations of any complaint related to any form of violence or human abuse".

== In other countries ==
=== United States and Canada ===
El Sistema USA, also known as National Alliance of El Sistema-Inspired Programs, is a national network of music education programs inspired by Venezuela's El Sistema model. It originated in 2009 as an initiative at the New England Conservatory and was incorporated as an independent nonprofit organization based in Durham, North Carolina, in 2014. In 2025, its network included more than 140 member programs serving more than 30,000 young people across the United States and Canada. El Sistema USA supports its members through professional development, providing assistance for emerging programs through training, mentoring, financial support, and administrative guidance. Its activities are aimed at using ensemble-based music education to promote social development, including among youth from underserved communities. The philosophy and aspirations of El Sistema USA are expressed on their website as:

"We envision a world in which every child — regardless of income, geography, or identity — has access to a high-quality music education program that builds community, opportunity, and personal growth. Our model emphasizes programs with free or low-cost tuition, frequent instruction (5-10+ hours per week), and ensemble-based learning."

== International recognition of El Sistema ==
- The Glenn Gould Prize was awarded to El Sistema founder José Antonio Abreu on 14 February 2008. Brian Levine, managing director of the Glenn Gould Foundation, in an account of his 2008 visit to Caracas wrote: "El Sistema has demonstrated conclusively that music education is the gateway to lifelong learning and a better future."
- The Prince of Asturias Award for the Arts was awarded to El Sistema on 28 May 2008.
- The National Performing Arts Convention 2008, held in Denver, Colorado, featured Abreu as a guest speaker on 13 June 2008.
- The TED Prize was awarded to José Antonio Abreu on 5 February 2009 for his work on El Sistema. A pre-recorded speech was played at the ceremony in which he explained his philosophy. The prize allowed for the creation of the Abreu Fellows.
- The Polar Music Prize from Sweden was awarded to El Sistema and Maestro Abreu in 2009.
- The Kellogg Institute for International Studies at the University of Notre Dame awarded Abreu the Notre Dame Prize for Distinguished Public Service in Latin America on 22 September 2014.
- The Institute of Education, University of London, awarded Abreu an honorary degree in 2013.
- UNICEF ratified El Sistema as Goodwill Ambassador for Children's Rights in 2022.

== In the media ==
- Tocar y Luchar (Play and Fight), a documentary film produced by Alberto Arvelo in 2004 on the subject of El Sistema. The film has won several awards, including Best Documentary at both the 2007 Cine Las Americas International Film Festival and also the CineMás Albuquerque Latino Film Festival.
- El Sistema, a 2008 documentary made by Paul Smaczny and Maria Stodtmeier about the system. Production: EuroArts Music Production, ARTE France, NHK. The film won the Best Documentary Feature Award at the Chicago International Movies and Music Festival in 2010 and Best Documentary at the Orlando Hispanic Film Festival in 2009.
- Dudamel: Conducting a Life is an hour-long PBS program hosted by Tavis Smiley on the subject of music education in the United States, with a focus on Gustavo Dudamel and his achievements with the L.A. Philharmonic. The report includes a look at how the Boston Conservatory Lab Charter School works with children.
- El Sistema: a report on CBS's 60 Minutes from 13 April 2008 which explores the "System" and includes interviews with some of the Venezuelan children who are members of an orchestra.
- Crescendo! The Power of Music: is a 2014 documentary film about Sistema-inspired programs in Philadelphia and Harlem.
- Mozart in the Jungle: the character of Rodrigo de Souza (played by Gael García Bernal) is loosely based on Gustavo Dudamel, the Venezuelan music director of the Los Angeles Philharmonic. Dudamel coached García Bernal before the latter conducted, in the character of Rodrigo, for a real performance of the Los Angeles Philharmonic at the Hollywood Bowl, scenes of which were used for the second season opener. Dudamel has a cameo in that episode, acting as a stagehand trying to convince Rodrigo to move to Los Angeles.
- The Music Inside, which tells the stories of Kidznotes students, wins both a Telly and a regional Emmy Award for Documentary Short Film in 2016–17.

== Notable alumni ==
- Gustavo Dudamel, current director of the New York Philharmonic and former musical director of the Los Angeles Philharmonic and Paris Opera, had his musical beginnings in El Sistema. According to Dudamel, "music saved my life and has saved the lives of thousands of at-risk children in Venezuela...like food, like health care, like education, music has to be a right for every citizen."
- Rafael Payare was hired as music director of San Diego Symphony and Montreal Symphony Orchestra
- Christian Vásquez became chief conductor of the Stavanger Symphony Orchestra
- In 2011 Diego Matheuz was appointed as principal conductor by La Fenice Theater of Venice
- Giancarlo Guerrero is the musical director of the Nashville Symphony
- Eduardo Marturet is the music director and conductor of the Miami Symphony Orchestra
- Since 2015 Carlos Izcaray is the conductor of the Alabama Symphony Orchestra
- Domingo Hindoyan is the chief conductor of the Royal Liverpool Philharmonic Orchestra.
- Rodolfo Saglimbeni in 2019 was appointed as principal conductor of the National Symphony Orchestra of Chile
- Rodolfo Barráez is the associate director of the Singapore Symphony Orchestra
- Natalia Luis-Bassas is professor at the Royal College of Music and principal guest conductor of Oxford University Orchestra
- Raphael Jiménez – associate professor of conducting and director of Oberlin College orchestras
- César Iván Lara is the principal conductor of the Philharmonic Orchestra of Mendoza (Argentina)
- Sergio Rosales conducted orchestras in Colombia, Belgium, Japan, and United States
- In 2019 Giancarlo Castro D'Addona became the conductor of the Reed College orchestra being the first Latin American conductor to obtain this position
- Alexis Cardenas is violin concert master of L'Orchestre national d'Île-de-France in París
- Edward Pulgar is principal second violin of the Knoxville Symphony Orchestra
- Gustavo Núñez served as principal bassoon of the Amsterdam Royal Concertgebouw Orchestra
- Jaime Martínez is principal oboe of the Orquesta Filarmónica de Medellín
- Double-bass player Edicson Ruiz became the youngest musician ever to join the Berlin Philharmonic Orchestra
- Tulio Cremisini is a percussionist, guitarist and composer. Currently is the Principal Timpanist with Miami Symphony Orchestra
- Paul Desenne cellist since 2016 he is composer in residence with the Alabama Symphony Orchestra
- Pedro Eustache is a multidirectional soloist flautist, and world-class reed and woodwind player
- Alcides Rodriguez, a clarinetist with the Atlanta Symphony Orchestra, has said that "the System was an open door to another dimension, a different world that I probably could have never seen."
- Victoria Sánchez is a musician, conductor and the music director of ALMAS, Sinfónica de Jóvenes Latinoamericanas.
- Ron Davis Alvarez is Artistic Director of El Sistema Sweden and the founder of the Dream Orchestra in Gothenburg, Sweden.

== Scholarship and criticism ==
Scholarship and criticism of El Sistema music education programs have been published by academic scholars and journalists since the 2000s. Following its founding in Venezuela in 1975, El Sistema has been widely praised as a pioneering model of music education and social inclusion. It has been credited with offering disadvantaged children access to orchestral training, fostering discipline, and promoting upward social mobility. Alongside its global acclaim there has been a body of critical scholarship that challenges many of the program's foundational claims. Critics argue that the evidence supporting El Sistema's social-transformation narrative is scant, sometimes based on internal reports or short-term evaluations rather than independent, long-term research.

British musicologist Geoffrey Baker wrote that many evaluations of El Sistema and El Sistema-inspired (ESI) programs in other countries have resulted in advocacy rather than explorative research, raising concerns about methodological rigor, sampling bias, sexual misconduct and over-reliance on participants' own reports. Baker questioned whether the program lives up to its rhetoric of social inclusion, stating that in practice many of its participants do not come from the most socio-economically disadvantaged groups. Baker criticised conductor Gustavo Dudamel for maintaining public cooperation with the program while avoiding direct criticism of the Venezuelan government, a stance that he described as artwashing.

At the same time, empirical studies have found benefits related to musical skill development or psychosocial outcomes among participating children. Researchers state that these findings are inconclusive without long-term, large-sample, independent evaluations. As a result, the academic debate remains unresolved, highlighting the need for more rigorous and transparent research to determine which claimed outcomes of El Sistema are reliably supported by evidence.

By producing many successful orchestral performers, El Sistema has established Venezuela's place on the international classical-music scene. The success of the program's graduates and of El Sistema's founder José Antonio Abreu, as well as of ESI local programs, has been highlighted in public newsmedia and specialized music-related publications.

== See also ==
- List of youth orchestras
- El Sistema USA
- El Sistema Sweden
