= El Sistema Sweden =

Swedish music education programme

- Formation: 2010
- Type: Nonprofit
- Headquarters: Gothenburg, Sweden
- Website: www.elsistema.se

El Sistema Sweden is a nationally coordinated music education programme and network of youth orchestras and choirs operating across Sweden. Inspired by the original Venezuelan programme El Sistema, it was launched in 2010 in the Gothenburg suburb of Angered through a publicly funded cultural school and has since expanded to dozens of sites throughout the country.

Through the efforts of the El Sistema Sweden Foundation, the programme supports music education in public cultural life and music schools, as well as after-school and preschool settings, offering children and young people access to orchestral and choral training regardless of their background.

The Swedish El Sistema-inspired programme has reached thousands of young people: at many locations, local orchestras and choirs provide regular instruction, while at the national level the El Sistema Sweden National Orchestra was established. In addition to this national youth orchestra, El Sistema Sweden maintains several major components: a teacher training initiative (El Sistema Academy), a digital learning platform (El Sistema Play) offering orchestral instruction and scores, and outreach projects such as an annual summer camp (Side by Side) and the Dream Orchestra for unaccompanied young refugees. It has been called the largest El Sistema programme outside of Latin America.

== History ==
El Sistema Sweden started in Angered, a neighbourhood of Gothenburg, in 2010 through a publicly funded arts-focused school. Since its foundation it has been incorporated into the national municipal music and culture school system and expanded to dozens of sites across Sweden. Thanks to public funding, courses for El Sistema Sweden are free or at low cost and offered to all children who attend the participating schools. Corresponding to the UNESCO Convention on the Protection and Promotion of the Diversity of Cultural Expressions, the formal lessons for different music genres, including classical, popular music, Swedish folk and other types of music, aim at welcoming children from immigrant and other underserved communities.

According to the programme, the El Sistema Sweden Foundation was initiated in 2012 by Gustavo Dudamel, Camilla Sarner, Robin Mannheimer, and others. Dudamel, former Principal Conductor of the Gothenburg Symphony Orchestra, is a graduate of El Sistema in Venezuela, and based on a mutual partnership, music students from Gothenburg and Caracas have participated in an exchange programme.

In 2014, Side by Side, a summer camp for children and young people aged 7–23, started as one of Gothenburg's jubilee projects, based on an idea of the city's citizens. According to the organizers, El Sistema Sweden managed the first camp with support from the Gothenburg Symphony Orchestra, bringing together more than 500 young musicians and educators for two days of shared music-making in Gothenburg. Since then Side by Side has been organized every year by the Gothenburg Symphony Orchestra and grown into one of the largest camps for young people performing in choirs and orchestras.

Since 2017, the yearly El Sistema Academy has been attended by around 100 music teachers at the Royal Academy of Music in Stockholm. The programme has focused on El Sistema teaching methods for Swedish schools. By early 2017, El Sistema in Sweden had partnered with 18 professional orchestras and choirs. More than 9,000 children across 35 sites in 30 cities in Sweden participate in the programme, which claims to be the largest El Sistema programme outside of Latin America.

In 2019, the El Sistema Sweden national youth orchestra was established. The youth orchestra and the Gothenburg Symphony Orchestra performed a concert under the patronage of Queen Silvia of Sweden in 2020, in celebration of El Sistema Sweden's tenth anniversary. Alongside traditional classical music, the El Sistema Sweden National Orchestra emphasizes new and contemporary compositions, including works by Scandinavian composers Benjamin Staern, Tormod Tvete Vik and others.

Ron Davis Alvarez, a graduate of El Sistema music education programme in Venezuela, has served as artistic director of the El Sistema inspired music education programme in Sweden and the El Sistema Sweden National Orchestra (Swedish: El Sistema Nationalorkester). Founded in 2019 by El Sistema Sweden and the Swedish music copyright organization STIM, the orchestra consists of more than 60 students of age 11 to 19 from all over Sweden. It has received support by the Royal Stockholm Philharmonic Orchestra and the Swedish Radio Symphony Orchestra and has performed in major music halls, including the Stockholm Concert Hall.

El Sistema Sweden created El Sistema Play, an online platform to support the programme globally, offering resources for practitioners, educators, and students, including orchestral video tutorials and scores from its shared repertoire. Another programme is the Dream Orchestra, where unaccompanied young refugees from Syria, Afghanistan, Iraq and Somalia have been playing musical instruments since 2016. Directed by Alvarez, the Dream Orchestra was awarded the Ockenden International Prize (2021) and the Pedagogy Prize from the Royal Swedish Academy of Music (2020) honouring the programme's impact on refugee empowerment through music.

== Reception ==
In their 2014 article “Studying El Sistema as a Swedish community music project from a critical perspective” Åsa Bergman and Monica Lindgren studied the implementation of El Sistema's methods and underlying social as well as educational goals from Venezuela into a Swedish context. The study pointed out a contradiction between El Sistema’s focus on classical music played in an orchestra and Swedish community music ideals that typically value more diverse musical practices and inclusive participation of students in the curriculum. Teachers in Swedish El Sistema-inspired courses have adapted these contradictions by integrating other musical genres and creative approaches alongside orchestral training. Ultimately, the study emphasizes the importance of context-sensitive, critical approaches when evaluating global educational models transplanted into new cultural settings.

In "Sharing Global Musics: El Sistema Sweden Summer Camp", Tricia Turnstall, a consultant and speaker on global El Sistema activities, reported on her impressions of the 2019 Side by Side music camp. She attended this five-day youth music gathering that brought together 2,500 seven- to seventeen-year-olds from Sweden and abroad. It was organized by the Gothenburg Symphony Orchestra, Sweden's national orchestra, in partnership with El Sistema Sweden.

Turnstall's observations focused on the inclusion of El Sistema students with those from mainstream music schools serving middle-class families, including a choir of youngsters with special needs. A team of over 150 conductors, teachers and administrators from various countries—offering expertise from Latin percussion to viola da gamba—guided the students. This form of mentoring included members of the Gothenburg Symphony Orchestra, who served as music coaches and role models. Further, she remarked a welcoming mix of planned activities and spontaneous ones, including an impromptu flash mob performance in a shopping mall. Commenting on the basic principles of El Sistema, Tunstall said:

El Sistema's goal is not the creation of professional musicians but the empowerment of young people; its pedagogical first principles are inclusion of all who want to belong, regardless of money or talent; immersive intensity, over years; and learning in and through ensemble.

— Tricia Tunstall, Sharing Global Musics: El Sistema Sweden Summer Camp

== See also ==
- List of youth orchestras
- Music education
- Music education for young children
- Music of Sweden
