= Grand Mariscal of Ayacucho Symphony Orchestra =

Grand Marshal of Ayacucho Symphony Orchestra
- Orchestra
- official logo
- Founded: 1989
- Principal conductor: Rodolfo Saglimbeni

The state-sponsored Grand Mariscal of Ayacucho Symphony Orchestra (Orquesta Sinfónica Gran Mariscal de Ayacucho, or OSGMA) has united a group of young Venezuelan musicians since it was established in 1989. Elisa Vegas has served as the Artistic Director since 2017.

== See also ==
- Venezuelan music
