= Ron Davis Alvarez =

Venezuelan conductor and violinist (born 1986)

Ron Davis Álvarez
- Born: 1986 (age 38–39); Caracas, Venezuela
- Genres: Classical; Contemporary classical
- Occupations: Conductor; violinist; music educator
- Instrument: Violin
- Years active: 2015–present
- Member of: Dream Orchestra, El Sistema National Orchestra, Sweden

Ron Davis Álvarez (born 1986 in Caracas, Venezuela) is a Venezuelan violinist, conductor and music educator. In his youth, he studied in Venezuela’s El Sistema music education movement. After his relocation to Sweden, he became the founder and artistic director of the Dream Orchestra, a youth orchestra and educational programme for refugee and immigrant children and teenagers in Gothenburg, Sweden. Álvarez served as artistic director of El Sistema Sweden and musical director of the El Sistema National Orchestra. He has lectured and led teacher-training and inclusion projects across Europe and beyond.

His work with the Dream Orchestra and with El Sistema Sweden has received national and international recognition, including the Royal Swedish Academy of Music’s Pedagogy Prize and the Ockenden International Prize for refugee projects in 2021.

== Biography ==
=== Early life and education ===
Álvarez was born in Caracas and grew up in the Guarenas–Guatire area of Venezuela. From an early age, he trained as a violinist within Venezuela’s Sistema Nacional de Orquestas y Coros Juveniles e Infantiles, commonly known as El Sistema, which shaped his approach to collective music education and social inclusion. Álvarez began his musical and pedagogical career within El Sistema in Venezuela, where he worked as a teacher and conductor in a local music centre. His early work with youth orchestras informed his later emphasis on teacher training and community-based orchestral programmes.

=== Career in Sweden ===
After relocating to Sweden in 2015 as an exchange student and following the 2015 European migrant crisis, Álvarez was appointed artistic director of El Sistema Sweden. During his tenure of six years, he developed projects including El Sistema Play, El Sistema Academy and the El Sistema Sweden national youth orchestra. Further, he worked on teacher-training initiatives and national youth-orchestra workshops. He served in the role of artistic director of El Sistema Sweden for several years.

=== Dream Orchestra and the national youth orchestra ===
In 2016 Álvarez and El Sistema Sweden founded the Dream Orchestra in Gothenburg. The orchestra has incorporated newly arrived unaccompanied minors and young refugees—many of whom had no previous musical training—and uses free collective orchestral practice as a tool for social integration, leadership development and musical training. The Dream Orchestra model has been cited as a role model for similar initiatives and has been adopted or studied in other countries.

In 2019, the El Sistema National Orchestra was formed with young musicians of different backgrounds, both children of migrants and of native Swedish parents. Under the musical direction of Alvarez and other musicians, this orchestra has selected more than 60 young people of age 11 to 19 from similar programmes and all over Sweden. Since its creation it has received support by the Royal Stockholm Philharmonic Orchestra and the Swedish Radio Symphony Orchestra and has performed in major music halls, including the Stockholm Concert Hall.

Alvarez has conducted and collaborated with symphony and youth orchestras, including in Sweden, Poland, Palestine, Lebanon and Greenland. Further, he is active as a teacher and trainer of teachers for children’s and youth orchestras. He has led workshops and masterclasses in more than 30 countries and been a tutor on higher education programmes related to orchestral pedagogy.

== Awards and recognition ==
Álvarez and projects he leads have received a number of honours:

- In 2017 Álvarez was selected among the Top 50 teachers worldwide by the Varkey Foundation as part of the Global Teacher Prize process.
- The Göran Lagervall Pedagogy Prize from the Royal Swedish Academy of Music (2020), awarded for his pedagogical work and development of orchestral education in cultural schools.
- The Dream Orchestra (Young Leaders Program) was one of the four winners of the Ockenden International Prizes for refugee projects in 2021.
- In 2021, he was awarded the Frihetstonen Award from the Torgny Segerstedts Minne Foundation.
- Additional recognition includes awards and invitations to speak at international forums, including the Nobel Week Dialogue in Gothenburg, and national honours connected to his work with refugee youth and music education.

== Selected publications ==
- Dream Orchestra: A Learning Model (co-authored; practical guide and model for inclusive collective music learning), co-authored with Franka Verhagen and published as part of the Dream Orchestra project materials.

== Reception ==
Press coverage, institutional reports and awards emphasize Álvarez’s contribution to using orchestral music as a tool for social integration and trauma-informed education. The Dream Orchestra has been described in media and specialized publications as a successful model for integrating unaccompanied refugee children into social and cultural life through music. Awards and institutional recognition have highlighted both the pedagogical and social outcomes of his work.

== See also ==
- List of youth orchestras
- Music education
- Music education for young children
- Music of Sweden
