= Edward Pulgar =

Venezuelan violinist and conductor (born 1974)

- Born: Edward José Pulgar Colina; September 30, 1974 (age 52); Caracas, Venezuela
- Genre: Classical
- Occupations: Violinist, conductor
- Instrument: Violin
- Years active: 1991–present
- Formerly of: Knoxville Symphony Orchestra

Edward Pulgar (September 30, 1974) is a Venezuelan violinist and conductor.

== Early life and education ==
Born in Caracas, Pulgar was trained through the National Youth Orchestra System in Venezuela (currently known as "El Sistema"). He began musical studies at age eight in solfege, percussion and violin at the Escuela de Música "Elias David Curiel" in Coro. His teachers included Giuseppe Maiolino, Miroslaw Kulikowsky, and Józef Szatanek. At thirteen years old, he won the special prize in the Juan Bautista Plaza V National Violin Competition and several other competitions in Venezuela. He continued his studies in violin and orchestral conducting at the Conservatorio José Luis Paz of Maracaibo, the Conservatorio Simón Bolívar, and the Latin-American Violin Academy under José Francisco del Castillo in Caracas. Pulgar earned an artist diploma from Duquesne University in Pittsburgh and recently a master's degree in music performance from Michigan State University. He now has a wife, Mary Pulgar, and three beautiful children, Ana, Claudia, and Antonio Pulgar.

== Career ==
He made his debut as a conductor at age twenty with the Zulia Symphony Orchestra in Venezuela. Three years later he became a member of Simón Bolívar Symphony Orchestra of Venezuela. Also, he has been a member of the Grand Rapids Symphony Orchestra in Michigan and Associate Principal of the Wheeling Symphony Orchestra in West Virginia, United States.

Mr. Pulgar has appeared as a soloist and concertmaster with symphonic orchestras in Venezuela and South America, and more recently with the Knoxville Symphony Orchestra at important concert halls such as Teresa Carreño Cultural Complex of Caracas, Panama's National Theatre, Beethovensaal of Stuttgart and Bonn, Teatro Colón of Bogotá, the PNC Recital Hall and Carnegie Music Hall in Pittsburgh, the Niswonger Performing Arts Center of Greenville, TN and the Knoxville Civic Auditorium, among others.

Currently, Mr. Pulgar is the Principal Second Violin of the Knoxville Symphony Orchestra, and a member of the Knoxville Symphony's Principal String Quartet, appearing throughout East Tennessee in recitals, concerts and radio and television appearances. He is also an adjunct professor of Strings at Carson-Newman University. He eagerly continues to pursue solo and chamber music in the U.S. and Latin America along with guest appearances as conductor.
