= Eduardo Marturet =

Venezuelan conductor (born 1953)

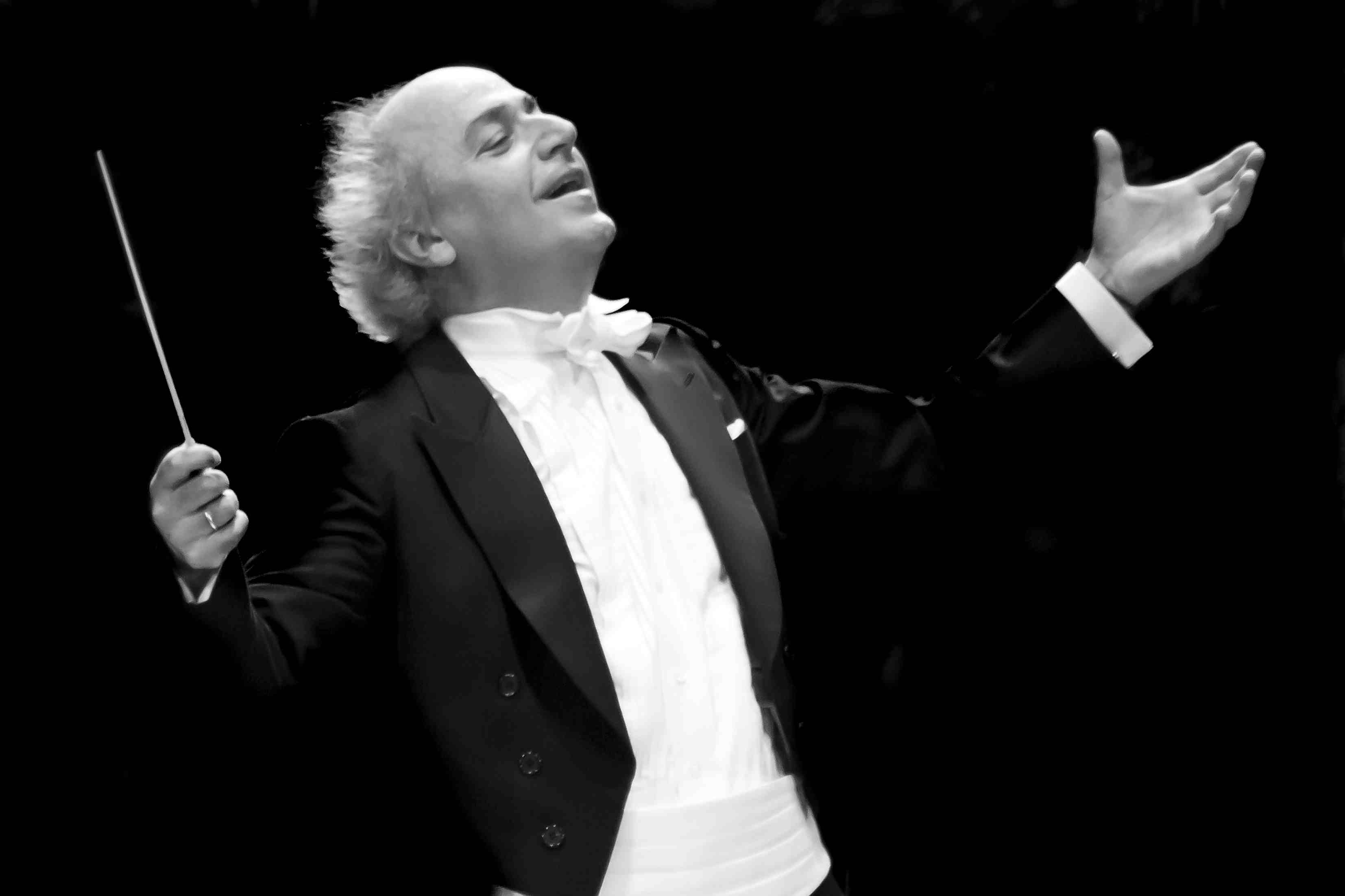

Background information
- Born: September 19, 1953 (age 72); Caracas, Venezuela
- Genres: Classical
- Occupations: Composer, conductor
- Instruments: Piano, Percussion
- Website: www.marturet.com/partners

Eduardo Marturet (born September 19, 1953) is a Venezuelan conductor and composer represented by Tempo Primo. He is the music director and conductor of The Miami Symphony Orchestra (MISO).

== Biography ==
As the music director and conductor of The Miami Symphony Orchestra, Marturet remains deeply involved in the musical life of his native Venezuela and continues to guest conduct actively in Europe. He has made more than 60 CDs that range from a Brahms orchestral cycle to surveys of Latin America's greatest orchestral composers.

European orchestras with which he has had an active guest conducting relationship include Berliner Symphoniker, European Community Chamber Orchestra, Staatsphilharmonie Rheinland-Pfalz, RAI Symphony Orchestra, Danish Radio Symphony, Royal Flemish Philarmonique, Nordwestdeutsche Philharmonie, Gelders Orkest, Bohemian Chamber Philharmonic, Budapest Radio Symphony, Brabant Orkest, and Concertgebouw Chamber Orchestra in Amsterdam. In 2001, he led the Berliner Symphoniker on a 12-concert tour of major South American cities including Caracas, São Paulo, Cordoba, Montevideo and Buenos Aires. A documentary of the tour was broadcast through the region by DirecTV.

Born in Caracas, Marturet studied in Cambridge, England where he became firmly rooted in the European tradition, obtaining a degree in piano, percussion, conducting, and composition. In 1979, he returned to Venezuela with a permanent position with the Orquesta Filarmónica de Caracas as associate conductor and later as Artistic Director to the Orquesta Sinfónica Venezuela, where he served in that position until 1995. Presently, he maintains close contact with the Venezuelan National Youth Orchestra movement, giving advice and support in aid of poor children.

With the opening of the Teresa Carreño Theatre in Caracas in 1984, Marturet became its first music director. After three years of bringing challenging and original productions to the stage, he resigned from the Theatre to dedicate himself entirely to an international career, conducting in Italy, Greece, France, Spain, England, Denmark, Holland, Korea, Norway, Sweden, Germany, Czechoslovakia, Belgium, Canada and the United States.

He made his Asian debut with the Seoul Philharmonic in 2003, a year when he also opened the Chorin Summer Festival in Berlin and made his debut with the Buenos Aires Philharmonic in Argentina and the Florida Philharmonic in Miami.

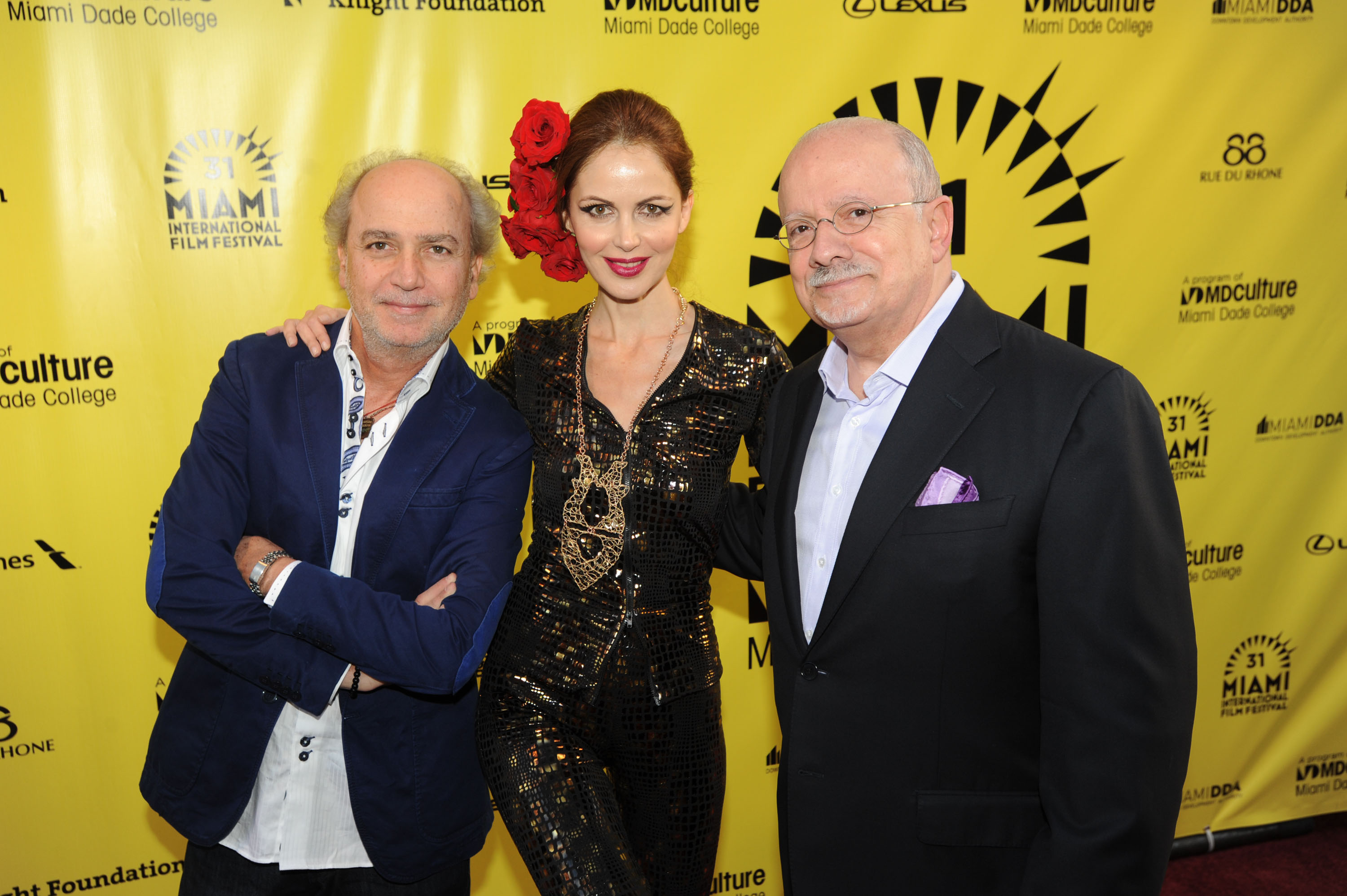
Eduardo Marturet, Athina Marturet & Eduardo J. Padrón

In 2006, he received a Latin Grammy nomination for "Encantamento" in the category of Best Classical Album conducting the Berliner Symphoniker.

Since 2006 he has been the music director and conductor of the Miami Symphony Orchestra; during his tenure he developed a classical-crossover repertoire in collaboration with producers including Emilio Estefan, Rudy Perez and Burt Bacharach.

In October 2012, he was named one of the “100 most influential latinos in Miami”. The ceremony was performed by Fusionarte Association, Pan-American Foundation and Televisa publishing. This same year, in March, the flag of the United States was flown over the U.S. Capitol in honor of Eduardo Marturet, who received the Medal of Merit of the U.S. Congress in recognition for his outstanding and invaluable service to the community.

In 2019, he was included in the Genius 100 Visions Group.

His wife Athina Klioumi is a Greek born actress, fashion model, producer philanthropist that supports The Miami Symphony Orchestra.

== Highlights ==
- 2014: Eduardo Marturet becomes a Steinway Artist.
- 2012: Marturet is awarded a Medal of Honor to the Merit of Congress. In March 2012, the flag of the United States was flown over the U.S. Capitol in honor of Eduardo Marturet, together with the Medal of Honor to the Merit of Congress. Marturet was honored with a lifetime achievement award for having made significant contributions to the development of the U.S. The awards ceremony took place on April 19 in the U.S. House Committee in D.C.
- 2010: Johnnie Walker Black Label "Walk With Giants." Eduardo Marturet was the first Venezuelan chosen to participate in the "Walk with Giants" campaign by Johnnie Walker Black Label, which included a concert for 6,000 people across major cities.
- 2010: MISO releases its first recording: Trumpet Glamour with Francisco Flores. Album details...
- 2010: The Miami Symphony Orchestra (MISO) and Eduardo Marturet agree to a second five-year contract as Music Director and Conductor. The renewal extends the contract through July 31, 2017.
- 2006: "Encantamento" Nominated for "Best Classical Album." The Latin Grammy nominations is pleased to announce that Marturet's "Encantamento" with the Berliner Symphoniker was nominated for "Best Classical Album" of the year. Album details...
- 2006: Miranda Soundtrack Wins "Best Music" at the Mérida Film Festival. The romantic soundtrack from the motion picture, "Francisco de Miranda" has won "Best Music" at the Mérida Film Festival in Venezuela. Listen and learn more about the Marturet's latest movie soundtrack. Album details...
- 2006: Miami Symphony Orchestra. Eduardo Marturet is appointed conductor and music director of the Miami Symphony Orchestra.
- 2004: Johnnie Walker 30th Anniversary Party. Marturet celebrated 30 years with a black tie event given by Johnnie Walker Black Label. Follow his footsteps from when he became number six of eight in the “clan” headed by his grandfather in Caracas through his career which took him to many places with many accomplishments.
- 2001: Berliner Latin Tour With Deutsche Bank's support, Marturet led the Berliner Symphoniker on a Latin American tour through Caracas, São Paulo, Cordoba, Buenos Aires, Montevideo, Mexico and Monterrey.
- 1988: Casa Bonita. This exhibit is the product if a research project concerning the scope of contemporary music and its ability to communicate, induce creative and sensitive attitudes in the public and change its intuitions.
- 1987: "Official" of the Order of Orange-Nassau. The "Official" of the Order of Orange-Nassau was bestowed upon Eduardo Marturet by Queen Beatrix of Holland.

== Compositions ==
=== Symphonic works ===
Name	Year	Place	Instrumentation	Notes
Turtle Magic	2015	Miami	For full orchestra and image projection	featuring the work of MISO's YEP project
VARIATIONS on With a Little Help from my Friends	2014	Miami	For full orchestra, solo voice & chorus	---
Candy Island	2014	Miami	For full orchestra and image projection	featuring the work of MISO's Music Arts Challenge project
Two Readings of Waldo	2013	Miami	For full orchestra and image projection	featuring the work of visual artist Waldo Balart
Latidos del Tíbet	2011	Caracas	For solo Tibetan Bowls and full orchestra	---
Memorias de Un Bravo Pueblo	2002	Caracas	For piano solo, side drum and strings	---
Mantra	1997	Caracas	For full orchestra	---
Capricho Criollo	1996	Caracas	For full orchestra	Commissioned by División de Alimentos de las Empresas Polar
Siglos de Luz	1995	Caracas	For solo guitar, solo percussion & full orchestra	Commissioned by CA ELECTRICIDAD DE CARACAS
XXXIII Variations on a German Theme	1989	Caracas	For full orchestra	Commissioned by the German Government
Music for the ballet "Secretos"	1986	Caracas	For full orchestra	Commissioned by Danza Hoy
Sol por Occidente	1982	Caracas	For full orchestra	Commissioned by 2nd Festival of Latin American Music
Notturno	1981	Caracas	For full orchestra	---

=== Chamber works ===
Name	Year	Place	Instrumentation	Notes
Paramythia	2002	Anthoussa	For harp solo	Commissioned by Arpas A.C.
La Hamaca	1998	Caracas	For guitar, flute and güiro	Published by Ediciones Tempo Primo, 1998
Música para 6 y Saxo	1992	Caracas	For 6 instruments ‘ad lib’ & solo tenor saxophone	Commissioned by Sinfonietta Caracas Published by Ediciones Tempo Primo, 1992
Tres Tiempos	1990	Caracas	For piano solo or guitar duo	Published by Ediciones Tempo Primo, 1990
Canto LLano	1976	Cambridge	For a capella instrument/voice & tape delay system, or any combination of instrumental/voice forces	Published by Ediciones Tempo Primo, 2004. Published by Hubertus Nogatz Editor – K&N 1209, 1991
Mi Marioneta tiene Tres Caras	1974	Cambridge	For piano solo	Published by Ediciones Tempo Primo, 1992

=== Film Music ===
Name	Year	Place	Instrumentation	Notes
Soundtrack for the film "Miranda"	2006	Caracas	For full orchestra	Award: "Best Music" Festival de Mérida, 2006
Soundtrack for the film "Manuela Saenz"	2000	Caracas	---	Award: "Best Music" ANAC de Caracas, 2004. Award: "Camara d'Or" Festival de Cannes, 2000
Soundtrack for the film "Oriana"	1984	Caracas	---	Award: "Best Music" Premio Municipal de Caracas, 1986. Award: "Best Music" Festival de Mérida, 1985

=== Experimental works ===
Name	Year	Place	Instrumentation	Notes
@ Zaha's Place	2015	Miami	For Mixed Techniques	Published by PRIVATE MUSIC, 2015 Read more...
Las Campanas del Silencio	1992	Caracas	For all the bells of the world	Published by Ediciones Tempo Primo, 1992
"Casa Bonita" (The 24 Hours)	1988	Caracas	For Mixed Techniques	Commissioned by the Caracas Contemporary Arts Museum Read more...
Musica Viva	1980	Caracas	For Mixed Techniques	Commissioned by the Caracas Contemporary Arts Museum Read more...
Piezas Cinéticas	1975	Caracas	For piano solo	Published by Ediciones Tempo Primo, 1975

=== Orchestral arrangements ===
Name	Year	Place	Instrumentation	Notes
Oblivion (Astor Piazzolla)	2009	Caracas	For solo violonchelo and orchestra	Published by Ediciones Tempo Primo, 2009
Adios Nonino (Astor Piazzolla/Bragato)	2009	Caracas	For solo violonchelo and orchestra	Published by Ediciones Tempo Primo, 2009
Langsamer Satz (Anton Webern)	2009	Miami	For orchestra	Published by Ediciones Tempo Primo, 2009
Otoño (Franco De Vita)	2006	Miami	For orchestra	Published by Ediciones Tempo Primo, 2006
Adios Nonino (Astor Piazzolla/Bragato)	2001	Berlin	For orchestra	Published by Ediciones Tempo Primo, 2001
Oblivion (Astor Piazzolla)	2001	Berlin	For orchestra	Published by Ediciones Tempo Primo, 2001

== Recordings ==
=== 2015-2001 ===
- Marturet – @ Zaha's Place Album details...
- Elgar – Enigma Variations, Mendelssohn – Calm Sea & Prosperous Voyage – Berliner Symphoniker
- Brahms – Complete Symphonies – Berliner Symphoniker
- An Evening in Vienna Live! Album details...
- Aprés un Reve. Album details...
- Beethoven – Piano Concerto No. 2. Album details...
- Canto LLano. Album details...
- Conciertos para Guitarra y Orquesta. Album details...
- Encantamento – Piazzolla, Guarnieri, Marquez, Estevez, Revueltas. Album details...
- Grieg/Mendelssohn – Piano Concertos. Album details...
- Homenaje – Revueltas, Carreño, Piazzolla, Castellanos. Album details...
- Latin Music Vol. 1. Album details...
- Marturet – Music for the film Manuela Sáenz. Album details...
- Marturet – Mantra, Canto LLano, etc. Album details...
- Memorias. Album details...
- Miranda Soundtrack. Album details...
- Mozart/Beethoven Piano Concertos. Album details...
- Oblivion. Album details...
- Opera Highlights. Album details...
- Salut d'Amour. Album details...
- Trumpet Glamour with Francisco Flores. Album details...
- Vivaldi: The Four Seasons; Piazzolla: The Four Seasons of Buenos Aires. Album details...

=== 2000-1996 ===
- Beethoven – Piano Concerto No. 1. Album details...
- Beethoven – Piano Concerto No. 3. Album details...
- Beethoven – Piano Concerto No. 5. Album details...
- Beethoven – Symphony No. 7 Op.92. Album details...
- Brahms – Symphony No. 2. Album details...
- Brahms – 4 Symphonies & Overtures (re-issue). Album details...
- Fantasía Venezolana. Album details...
- Grieg – Piano Concerto. Album details...
- Mendelssohn – Piano Concerto No. 1, Capriccio Brillante. Album details...
- Mozart's mooiste muziek. Album details...
- Venezuelan Classics – works by Carreño, Montes and Marturet. Album details...

=== 1995-1991 ===
- Brahms – Symphony No. 1 & Tragic Overture. Album details...
- Brahms – Symphony No. 2. Album details...
- Brahms – Symphony No. 3 & Haydn Variations. Album details...
- Brahms – Symphony No. 4 & Academic Overture. Album details...
- Brahms – Piano Concerto No. 1. Album details...
- Brahms – Piano Concerto No. 2. Album details...
- Brahms – Violin Concerto. Album details...
- Brahms – Double Concerto for Violin & Cello. Album details...
- Dvorak – Symphony No. 9 Op.95. Album details...
- Marturet – Siglos de Luz. Album details...
- Mediodía en el LLano. Album details...
- Rodrigo – Concierto de Aranjuéz. Album details...
- Strauss/Grieg/Sibelius – Lieder. Album details...
- Tchaikovsky – Piano Concerto No. 1. Album details...
- Tierra de Gracia. Album details...

=== 1990-1983 ===
- Montes – Fantasía Venezolana para 2 Guitarras. Album details...
- Mozart – Divertimento in B K 137, Violin Concerto No. 3 K 216, Symphony No. 29 K 201. Album details...
- Mozart – Symphonies No. 5, 11, 13, 21, 27. Album details...
- Mozart – Violin Concertos, Adagio, Rondos. Album details...
- Mozart – Violin Concertos, Adagio, Rondos. Album details...
- Chopin – Piano Concerto No. 1, Andante Spianato & Gran Polonaise. Album details...
- Duarte – Sinfonietta La Mar. Album details...
- Beethoven – Triple Concerto, Romanza in G Op.40. Album details...
- Música Venezolana de Conciertos. Album details...
- Noche Transfigurada. Album details...

== Orchestras conducted ==
Principal Orchestras:

- 2005–present. Miami Symphony Orchestra

(Miami, USA)

- 1991–present. Berliner Symphoniker

(Berlin, Germany)

- 1978–present. Venezuelan National Youth Orchestras

(Caracas, Venezuela)

- 1978–present. Orquesta Sinfónica Simón Bolívar

(Caracas, Venezuela)

- 2003 – 2005. Orquesta Filarmónica de Buenos Aires

(Buenos Aires, Argentina)

- 1989 – 1990. Concertgebouw Chamber Orchestra

(Amsterdam, Netherlands)

- 1988 – 1991. Symfoniorkesteret i Stavanger

(Stavanger, Norway)

- Orquesta Filarmonica de Cali, Cali – Colombia '11
- Orquesta Sinfonica Juvenil Teresa Carreño – Venezuela '09
- The Miami Symphony Orchestra, Miami – USA '05
- El Paso Symphony Orchestra, El Paso – USA '05
- Orquesta Sinfónica de UNCUYO, Mendoza – Argentina '04
- Florida Philharmonic, Miami – Florida '03
- Orquesta Filarmónica de Buenos Aires, Buenos Aires – Argentina '03
- Seoul Philharmonic Orchestra, Seoul – South Korea '03
- Florida Chamber Orchestra, Miami – USA '01
- Orquesta Sinfónica de Concepción Concepción – Chile '98
- Gävle Symphony Orchestra, Gävle – Sweden '98
- Bohemian Chamber Philharmonic Netherland Tourne '96
- San Jose Symphony, San Jose – California '95
- Orquesta Pablo Sarasate Pamplona, España '95
- Staatsphilharmonie Rheinland-Pfalz, Rheinland-Pfalz – Germany '93
- Royal Flemish Philarmonique, Antwerp – Belgium '92
- Budapest Concert Orchestra, Budapest – Hungary '91
- Berliner Symphoniker, Berlin – Germany '91
- Nordwestdeutsche Philharmonie, Herford – Germany '91
- Concertgebouw Chamber Orchestra, Amsterdam – Holland '89
- Orquesta Sinfónica Nacional, San José – Costa Rica '89
- Symfoniorkesteret i Stavanger, Stavanger – Norway '88
- Colorado Festival Orchestra, Colorado – USA '88
- Gelders Orkest, Arhem – Holland '88
- CRJT Orchestra, Toronto – Canada '88
- Budapest Radio Symphony, Budapest – Hungary '87
- Brabant Orkest, Denbosch – Holland '86
- Frysk Orkest, Leeuwarden – Holland '84
- Opera Teresa Carreño, Caracas – Venezuela '84
- European Community Chamber Orchestra Italian Tourne '84
- Orchestra da Camera di Torino Italian Tourne '84
- Ensamble Instrumental de Provence, Nice – France '84
- "Croissiere Musicale de Jeunes Virtuoses", France – Malta – Sicily – Greece '84
- RAI Symphony Orchestra, Roma – Italia '83
- Danish Radio Symphony, Copenhagen – Denmark '83
- Santa Cecilia Chamber Players, Roma – Italia '83
- Orquesta Sinfónica Venezuela, Caracas – Venezuela '82
- "Festivale Primavera Musicale di Roma", Roma – Italia '81
- Romanian Radio Chamber Orchestra, Roma – Italia '81
- "Croissiere Musicale de Jeunes Solistes", Greek Islands '81
- Orquesta Sinfónica Maracaibo, Maracaibo – Venezuela '80
- Orquesta Sinfónica Municipal de Caracas, Caracas – Venezuela '80
- Orquesta Filarmónica de Bogotá, Bogotá – Colombia '79
- The Cambridge Players, Cambridge – England '79
- Orquesta Sinfónica Simón Bolivar, Caracas – Venezuela '78

== Orchestra tours ==
- 2001 – Berliner Symphoniker

(Latin America)

- 1996 – Bohemian Chamber Philharmonic

(Netherlands)

- 1993 – Staatsphilharmonie Rheinland-Pfalz

(Netherlands)

- 1991 – Nordwestdeutsche Philharmonie

(Germany)

- 1988 – Gelders Orkest

(Netherlands)

- 1986 – Brabant Orkest

(Netherlands)

- 1984 – European Community Chamber Orchestra

(Italy)

- 1984 – Orchestra da Camera di Torino

(Italy)
