= José Antonio Abreu =

Venezuelan politician and musician (1939–2018)

José Antonio Abreu OSC
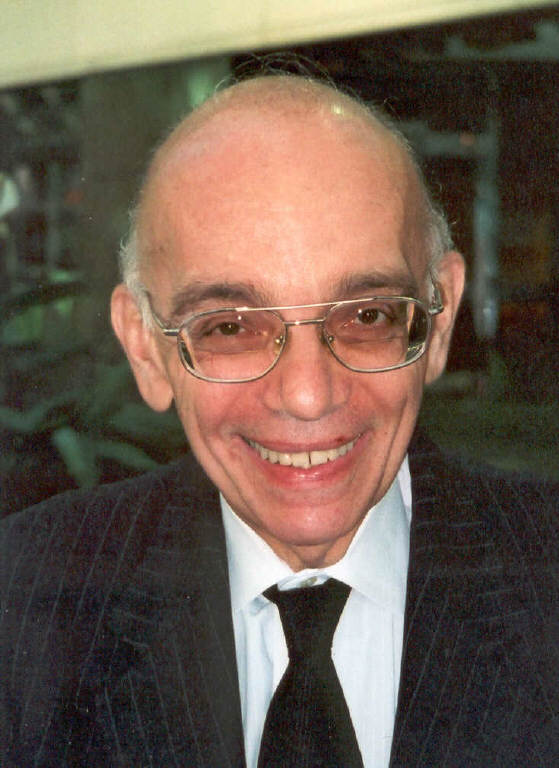
- Abreu (2007)
- Born: José Antonio Abreu Anselmi; May 7, 1939; Valera, Venezuela
- Died: March 24, 2018 (aged 78); Caracas, Venezuela
- Education: Universidad Católica Andres Bello
- Occupations: Orchestra conductor, pianist, economist, educator, activist, politician
- Known for: Founder of El Sistema
- Awards: Right Livelihood Award

José Antonio Abreu Anselmi (May 7, 1939 – March 24, 2018) was a Venezuelan orchestra conductor, pianist, economist, educator, activist, and politician best known for his association with El Sistema. He was honored with the 2009 Latin Grammy Trustees Award, an honor given to people who have contributed to music by the Latin Academy of Recording Arts & Sciences.

== Politics and academics ==
Born in the small Andean city of Valera, Abreu graduated with a summa cum laude as an economist at Universidad Católica Andres Bello in Caracas. For many years, his official biography stated that he had been awarded a PhD degree in Petroleum Economics from the University of Pennsylvania, but El Sistema withdrew this claim in December 2017. He was elected as a deputy at the Chamber of Deputies in the Congress of Venezuela in 1963. He served as director of planning at Cordiplan. After his political career, he also worked as a professor of economics and law at Universidad Simón Bolívar and his alma mater. He would return to politics in 1988 to serve as Minister of Culture and president of the National Council of Culture, posts he held until 1993 and 1994, respectively.

== Music ==
Abreu moved to Caracas in 1957 to study composition. Abreu later studied music with Doralisa Jiménez de Medina in Barquisimeto. Later, he attended the Caracas Musical Declamation Academy in 1957, where he studied piano with Moisés Moleiro, organ and harpsichord with Evencio Castellanos, and composition with Vicente Emilio Sojo. In 1967, he received the Symphonic Music National Prize for his musical ability. It was in 1975 that he founded El Sistema, formally known as the Foundation for the National Network of Youth and Children Orchestras of Venezuela.

This was an innovative youth education method in which music was the primary avenue for social and intellectual improvement. He received the National Music Prize for this work at El Sistema in 1979. Under Abreu's guidance, El Sistema has participated in exchange and cooperation programmes with Canada, Spain, Latin American countries and the United States.

Abreu was the founder of the Simón Bolívar Symphony Orchestra.

== Teacher ==
Abreu was the teacher to several generations of Venezuelan classical music performers, including Gustavo Dudamel, the musical director of the Los Angeles Philharmonic Orchestra.

== Awards and recognition ==
In 1993, El Sistema was awarded the famous IMC-UNESCO International Music Prize in the institution class. UNESCO also appointed Abreu as a Special Ambassador for the Development of a Global Network of Youth and Children Orchestras and Choirs in 1995 and as a special representative for the development of network of orchestras within the framework of UNESCO's "World Movement of Youth and Children Orchestras and Choirs". This project was created in the context of an inter-disciplinary project "Towards a Culture of Peace". Abreu co-ordinated the programme through the UNESCO office in Caracas and was designated a Goodwill Ambassador by UNESCO in 1998.

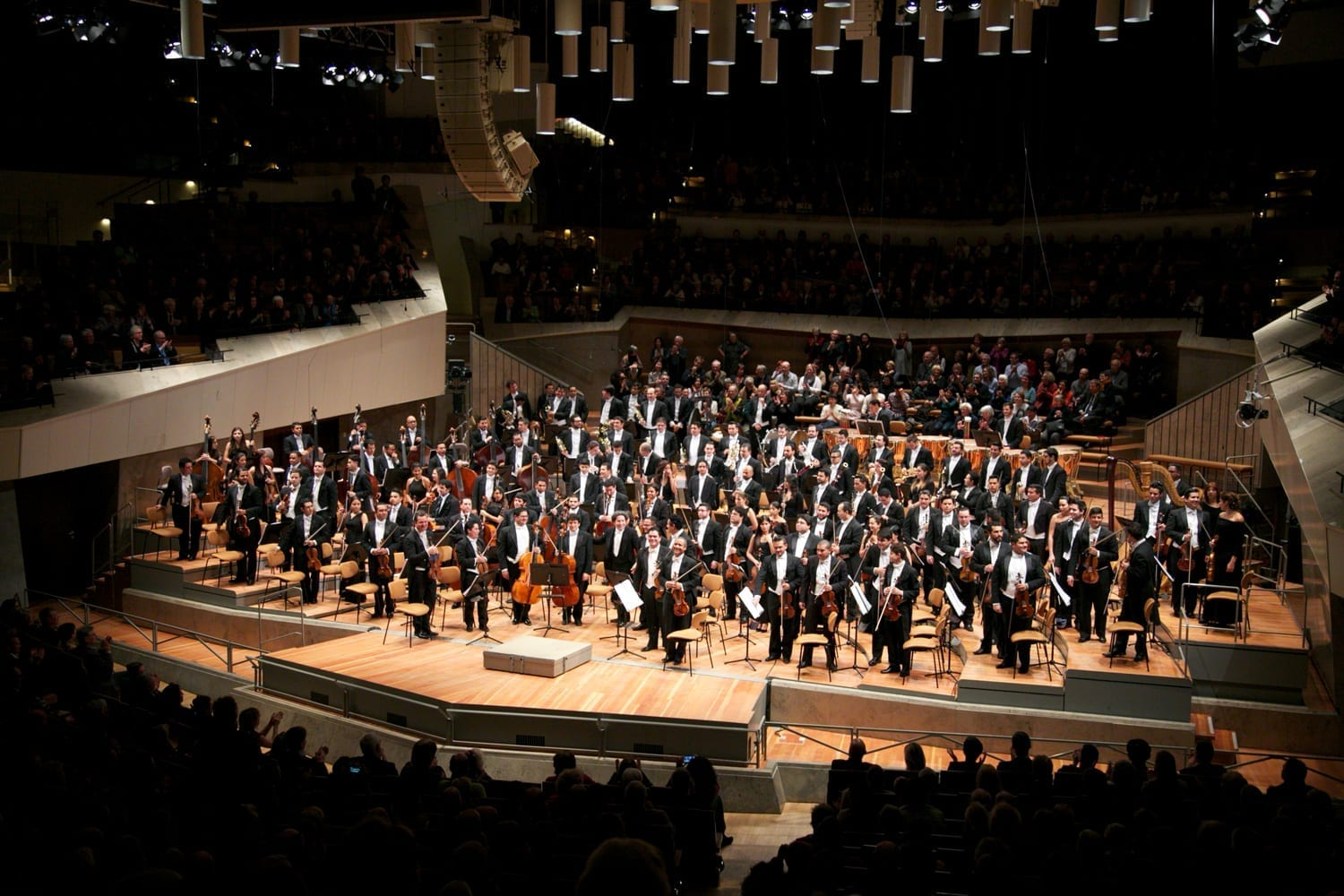
Simón Bolívar Symphony Orchestra of Venezuela at the Berlin Philharmonic Hall with Gustavo Dudamel

In 2001, Abreu was honoured with a Right Livelihood Award and was honored with the World Culture Open Creative Arts Award in 2004. Among his numerous awards are the Order of the Rising Sun, Grand Cordon (Japan, 2007), the Glenn Gould Prize (Canada, 2008), the Puccini International Prize (Italy, 2008), the Q Prize with former student and protégé Gustavo Dudamel (USA, 2008) and honorary memberships at the Royal Philharmonic Society (2008, United Kingdom) and the Beethoven-Haus Society (Germany, 2008). Abreu is also co-founder and vice-chairman of YOA Orchestra of the Americas.

When the B'nai B'rith Venezuelan brand gave Abreu their B'nai B'rith Human Rights Award in 2008, Abreu succinctly summarized the goal of El Sistema and of his life's work by saying, "In the struggle for Human Rights, let us vigorously incorporate children's sublime right to music, in whose bosom shines Beingness in its splendor and its ineffable mystery. Let us reveal to our children the beauty of music and music shall reveal to our children the beauty of life.".

In 2008, the Prince of Asturias Awards for arts was awarded to El Sistema and Abreu accepted it in his capacity of director. In 2009, Abreu received the Crystal Award of the World Economic Forum and the TED Prize, which consists of 100,000 dollars and one wish to change the world. The description for his awards described his work at El Sistema as it read, "the maestro who's transformed the lives of tens of thousands of kids... through classical music".

On May 12, 2009, Abreu was awarded the Polar Music Prize, given by the Royal Swedish Academy of Music. Abreu and Peter Gabriel, who also won, were presented with their awards by King Carl Gustaf at a gala ceremony at the Stockholm Concert Hall on 31 August. The Royal Swedish Academy of Music said about Abreu:

The Polar Music Prize 2009 is awarded the Venezuelan conductor, composer and economist José Antonio Abreu. Driven by a vision that the world of classical music can help improve the lives of Venezuela’s children, he created the music network El Sistema, which has given hundreds of thousands the tools to leave poverty. José Antonio Abreu’s successful creation has promoted traditional values, like respect, fellowship and humanity. His achievement shows us what is possible when music is made the common ground and thereby part of people’s everyday lives. Simultaneously, a new hope for the future has been given children and parents, as well as politicians. The vision of José Antonio Abreu serves as a model to us all.

In 2010, Abreu was awarded the Erasmus Prize. In 2012, Abreu was awarded an honorary doctorate by the Institute of Education, University of London in recognition of his services to music education and social change.

Abreu received the Order of the Southern Cross from Brazilian President Dilma Rousseff in April 2013.

On September 22, 2014, the Kellogg Institute for International Studies at the University of Notre Dame awarded Abreu the Notre Dame Prize for Distinguished Public Service in Latin America.

In 2012, Abreu was awarded an Honorary Degree from Carleton University for his “outstanding contribution to the advancement of underprivileged youth through music and education”. The Simón Bolívar String Quartet performed in honour of Abreu, joined by the OrKidstra Quintet of Ottawa's own El Sistema program.

In 2017, Abreu became Member of Honor of Kultur für ALLE e.V., Frankfurt am Main, Germany
