= Simón Bolívar String Quartet =

The Simón Bolívar String Quartet is a Venezuelan string quartet. The ensemble consists of principal musicians of the Orquesta Sinfónica Simón Bolívar: The first formation was with Alejandro Carreño and Boris Suarez, violins; Ismel Campos, viola; and Aimon Mata, cello. Venezuela has been in the midst of a severe political and economic crisis for several years, which worsened significantly after the spring 2018 national election, the members of the Simón Bolívar String Quartet has changed and now the quartet is formed by Jesus Andrés Guzman Fajardo, Ollantay Velazquez, Santo Scala, and Mariana Fermin. Their recordings can be heard on the Deutsche Grammophon label. and DAG Klassical.
