= Rodolfo Saglimbeni =

Venezuelan conductor (1962–2025)

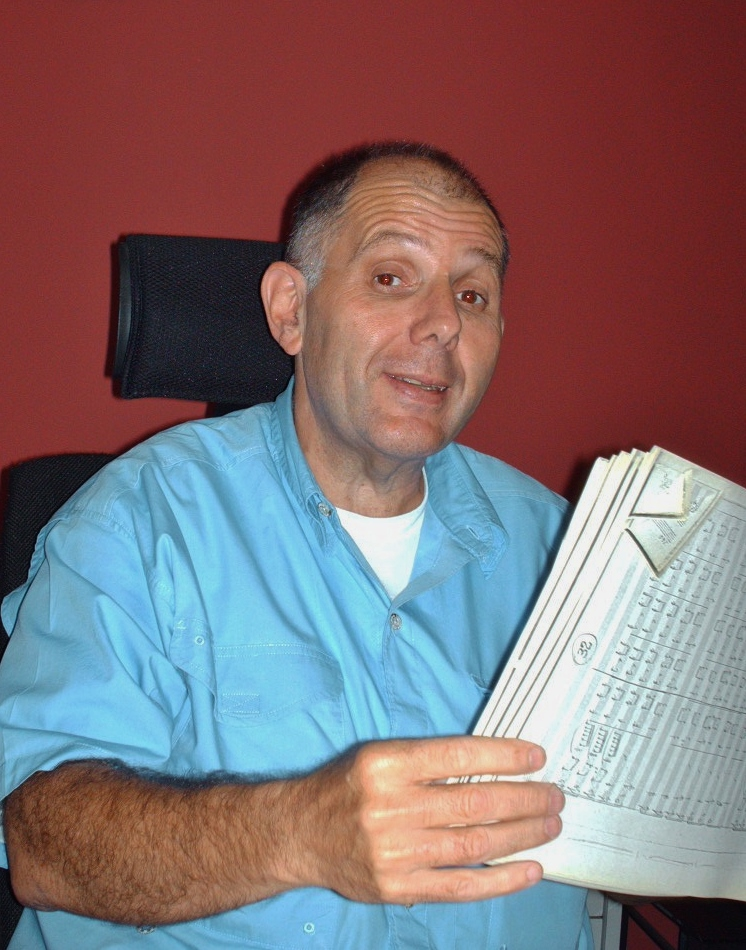
- Saglimbeni in 2013
- Born: 8 December 1962; Barquisimeto, Venezuela
- Died: 4 June 2025 (aged 62); Caracas, Venezuela
- Occupation: Orchestra conductor

Rodolfo Saglimbeni (8 December 1962 – 4 June 2025) was a Venezuelan conductor. He studied music in Venezuela and then at the Royal Academy of Music of London with Colin Metters, John Carewe, and George Hurst, obtaining his degree with Honors.

== Life and career ==
Saglimbeni studied under Franco Ferrara at the Accademia Nazionale di Santa Cecilia (Rome) in 1981. He served as Associate Director of the Caracas Sinfonietta and Venezuela Symphony Orchestra, as well as in the role of founder and Artistic Director of the Great Marshal of Ayacucho Symphony orchestra, and Musical Director of the Teresa Carreño Cultural Complex.

In 1985, he won second prize at France's International Besançon Competition for Young Conductors; where he was also the youngest conductor that year. He returned to Venezuela in 1987. He was invited to conduct symphony orchestras in France, Italy, Spain, the United Kingdom, Brazil, Colombia, Peru, Ecuador, Chile, Argentina and El Salvador.

In 1990, he was hired as tutor and later as Co-director of the summer course of the Canford Summer School of music (which moved location and is now the Sherborne Summer School of Music) in England. He was awarded the prize of Best Director of the Year and National Prize of the Artist and decorated with the Order “José Félix Ribas” First Class. In March 1999, he won the Director of the Americas Award in Santiago de Chile. In 2003, he was appointed artistic director of the Municipal Symphony Orchestra of Caracas. In 2019 Saglimbeni was appointed Principal Conductor of the National Symphony Orchestra of Chile.

Saglimbeni died in Caracas on 4 June 2025, at the age of 62, some four months after being diagnosed with and treated for an "aggressive illness".
