= Bacurau =

2019 film by Kleber Mendonça Filho and Juliano Dornelles

- Theatrical release poster
- Directed by: Kleber Mendonça Filho; Juliano Dornelles
- Written by: Kleber Mendonça Filho; Juliano Dornelles
- Produced by: Emilie Lesclaux; Saïd Ben Saïd; Michel Merkt
- Starring: Sônia Braga; Udo Kier; Bárbara Colen; Thomás Aquino; Silvero Pereira; Karine Teles
- Cinematography: Pedro Sotero
- Edited by: Eduardo Serrano
- Music by: Mateus Alves; Tomaz Alves Souza
- Production companies: CinemaScópio Produções; SBS Productions; Globo Filmes; Símio Filmes; Arte France Cinéma; Canal Brasil; Telecine
- Distributed by: Vitrine Filmes (Brazil); SBS Distribution (France)
- Release dates: 15 May 2019 (Cannes); 29 August 2019 (Brazil); 25 September 2019 (France)
- Running time: 132 minutes
- Countries: Brazil; France
- Languages: Portuguese; English
- Budget: $1.4 million
- Box office: $3.5 million

Bacurau (Portuguese for 'nightjar'; [bɐkuˈɾaw]) is a 2019 surreal Weird Western film written and directed by Kleber Mendonça Filho and Juliano Dornelles. Starring Sônia Braga, Udo Kier, Bárbara Colen, Thomás Aquino, Silvero Pereira, and Karine Teles, it revolves around the fictional small town of Bacurau, in the Brazilian sertão, that is beset by strange happenings following the death of its matriarch Carmelita (Lia de Itamaracá) at the age of 94.

The film had its world premiere at the main competition of the 2019 Cannes Film Festival on 15 May, where it won the Jury Prize. It was theatrically released in Brazil on 29 August by Vitrine Filmes, and in France on 25 September by SBS Distribution.

== Plot ==
In the near future, the people of Bacurau, an impoverished, rural settlement in the fictional municipality of Serra Verde, in western Pernambuco, gather for the funeral of Carmelita, an elderly woman seen as the matriarch of the community. Her granddaughter Teresa, now a young woman, returns to town after many years for the occasion, and to deliver some medicine. In the following days, the village experiences a sequence of strange events, including the town inexplicably disappearing from online maps and satellite images, loss of mobile phone signal, sightings of a UFO-shaped drone and an unnamed couple from southern Brazil passing through town on motorcycles.

There is an ongoing dispute over water rights from the local river, with water being dammed upstream in a corrupt scheme masterminded by the wealthy mayor of Serra Verde, Tony Junior. He visits Bacurau in an attempt to secure its residents' votes in an upcoming election with old food and tattered books, but no water; the townspeople all hide to avoid him. A tanker truck of water finally arrives for the town, but it has been riddled with bullets.

When horses stampede through town, two local men are sent to investigate the nearby farm from where they presumably escaped and find the family that owned it murdered. As they attempt to leave the property, they too are murdered, by the southern motorcyclists. This couple then meets again up with a group of mostly American foreigners led by Michael (a German living in the United States for over 40 years). The couple is chastised for killing the two men, as killing them deprived the foreigners of two chances to score "points." After receiving unheard instructions through earpieces, the foreigners kill the couple and then argue over who earned the points for their deaths.

The foreigners begin hunting the townspeople, and Pacote, Teresa's former lover, seeks out Lunga, a revolutionary protecting and being sheltered by the townspeople. Pacote convinces Lunga to join his fight against the foreigners. As the townspeople arm themselves, the foreigners kill a nine-year-old boy and cut off the town's electricity.

The following morning, as the foreigners go hunting, they are gradually overpowered and killed by the locals, with the exception of Michael, who ends up captured. Tony Junior shows up to collect the foreigners in a luxury minibus. When he sees that the townspeople have won, he denies knowing the foreigners until the captured Michael yells to him for help. The mayor is sent away to die in the desert, half-naked and tied up to a donkey, while Michael is buried alive in an underground cell while shouting "this is only the beginning."

== Cast ==
- Sônia Braga as Domingas
- Udo Kier as Michael
- Bárbara Colen as Teresa
- Thomás Aquino as Pacote / Acácio
- Silvero Pereira as Lunga
- Thardelly Lima as Tony Jr.
- Rubens Santos as Erivaldo
- Wilson Rabelo as Plínio
- Carlos Francisco as Damiano
- Luciana Souza as Isa
- Karine Teles as Foreigner
- Julia Marie Peterson as Julia
- Tânia Maria as resident of Bacurau

== Production ==
=== Filming ===
Bacurau was filmed in the village of Barra in the municipality of Parelhas and in the rural area of the municipality of Acari, at the Sertão do Seridó region, in Rio Grande do Norte, with scenes shot in the Gargalheiras dam. The film crew visited over 20 cities in the Northeast countryside to find the appropriate filming location. The crew shot 12-hour days for 8 weeks.

Cinematographer Pedro Sotero worked on the film alongside Mendonça and Dornelles for a third time, following Neighboring Sounds (2012) and Aquarius (2016). The film production chose to use a Panavision Anamorphic C-series lenses along with a 4:3 digital sensor for the compact and a reliable ARRI Alexa Mini. This stylistic choice became expensive, with the specific lenses not being sold in Brazil, the crew had to import them from both the United States and France. For the directors it helped "create this tension between a very Brazilian film and a certain distortion that you associate with classic American films. I think we were very lucky to make the film exactly the way we wanted it to make."

A self-proclaimed cinephile, Kleber Mendonça Filho stated in an interview that the cinematographers for the film drew inspiration from several sources, including both 1970's American western style films and Italian westerns from the 1960's.

Bacurau departed from several cinematographic norms during its production. Among these include the use of zooms and diopters which struck many cinephiles as somewhat of a call back to older filming techniques. Another stylistic departure from what many consider to be standard in the filming industry was the lack of a steady camera on set, with the directors opting to use tracks instead: "I have nothing against it; it's an interesting tool. But for this film, we wanted to move the camera using only tracks. By the end of the shoot, the gaffer said we had laid down 1,300 meters of tracks for this film, in eight and a half weeks' shoot."

== Reception ==
On review aggregator Rotten Tomatoes, Bacurau holds an approval rating of 93% based on 165 reviews, with an average rating of 7.7/10. The website's critical consensus reads, "Formally thrilling and narratively daring, Bacurau draws on modern Brazilian sociopolitical concerns to deliver a hard-hitting, genre-blurring drama." On Metacritic, the film has a weighted average score of 82 out of 100, based on 25 critics, indicating "Universal acclaim".

Barry Hertz of The Globe and Mail gave Bacurau a favorable review, saying it was a "fiery anti-colonialism polemic with so much on its mind that you'll likely come out of it feeling as dazed as the titular village's people," while Monica Castillo of RogerEbert.com praised its "twists and turns." Additionally, Bacurau received the 'critic's pick' of The New York Times in March 2020, and was described as "engimatic, exhilarating, and otherworldly". David Friend of The Canadian Press highlighted Udo Kier's performance saying it was "one of his best villainous roles."

== Release ==
It was released by Vitrine Filmes in Brazil and SBS Distribution in France. Its North American release was interrupted by the COVID-19 pandemic, prompting the distributor Kino-Lorber to seek alternate means. It created a "virtual cinema" distribution model in which it partnered with some 150 independent theaters in North America. The first run of the film streams in an exclusive limited release window through the theaters' websites. Kino-Lorber shares the revenues with the theaters.
