= Toll (film) =

- Promotional release poster
- Portuguese: Pedágio
- Directed by: Carolina Markowicz
- Written by: Carolina Markowicz
- Produced by: Karen Castanho Vega; Fernando Fraiha; Carolina Markowicz; Bianca Villar; Luís Urbano; Sandro Aguilar
- Starring: Maeve Jinkings; Thomás Aquino
- Cinematography: Luis Armando Arteaga
- Edited by: Lautaro Colace; Ricardo Saraiva
- Music by: Filipe Derado
- Production companies: Biônica Filmes; O Som e a Fúria; Globo Filmes; Paramount Pictures
- Distributed by: Paris Filmes; Downtown Filmes
- Release date: September 8, 2023 (TIFF)
- Running time: 102 minutes
- Country: Brazil
- Language: Portuguese

Toll (Portuguese: Pedágio) is a 2023 Brazilian-Portuguese drama film written, directed and co-produced by Carolina Markowicz. The film stars Maeve Jinkings as Suellen, a woman who gets drawn into a criminal gang as she tries to raise the money to send her gay son to a conversion therapy program.

The cast also includes Thomás Aquino, Isac Graça, Caio Macedo, Kauan Alvarenga and Aline Marta Maia.

== Production ==
The film was first announced in 2020 as Markowicz's feature debut, although production was delayed and she instead released Charcoal (Carvão) in 2022 before completing Toll.

== Distribution ==
The film premiered in the Centrepiece program at the 2023 Toronto International Film Festival, where Markowicz has been named as the recipient of the Emerging Talent Award. After screening as part of the official competition at the 24th Havana Film Festival New York, Markowicz received the Havana Star Prize for Best Director.

It is also slated to screen in the Horizontes Latinos program at the 71st San Sebastián International Film Festival.

== Reception ==
=== Critical response ===
Toll has an approval rating of 100% on review aggregator website Rotten Tomatoes, based on 17 reviews, and an average rating of 7.5/10.

=== Accolades ===
Award	Date of ceremony	Category	Recipient(s)	Result	Ref.
Rome Film Festival	28 October 2023	Best Film	Carolina Markowicz	Won	
Grand Otelo Prize of Brazilian Cinema	28 August 2024	Best Film	Bianca Villar, Carolina Markowicz, Fernando Fraiha, Karen Castanho, Luís Urbano and Sandro Aguilar	Won	
Grand Otelo Prize of Brazilian Cinema	28 August 2024	Best Director	Carolina Markowicz	Won	
Grand Otelo Prize of Brazilian Cinema	28 August 2024	Best Original Screenplay	Carolina Markowicz	Won	
Grand Otelo Prize of Brazilian Cinema	28 August 2024	Best Actress	Maeve Jinkings	Nominated	
Grand Otelo Prize of Brazilian Cinema	28 August 2024	Best Supporting Actress	Aline Marta Maia	Nominated	
Grand Otelo Prize of Brazilian Cinema	28 August 2024	Best Sound	André Bellentani, Filipe Derado e Toco Cerqueira	Nominated	
