= Maeve Jinkings =

Brazilian actress (born 1976)

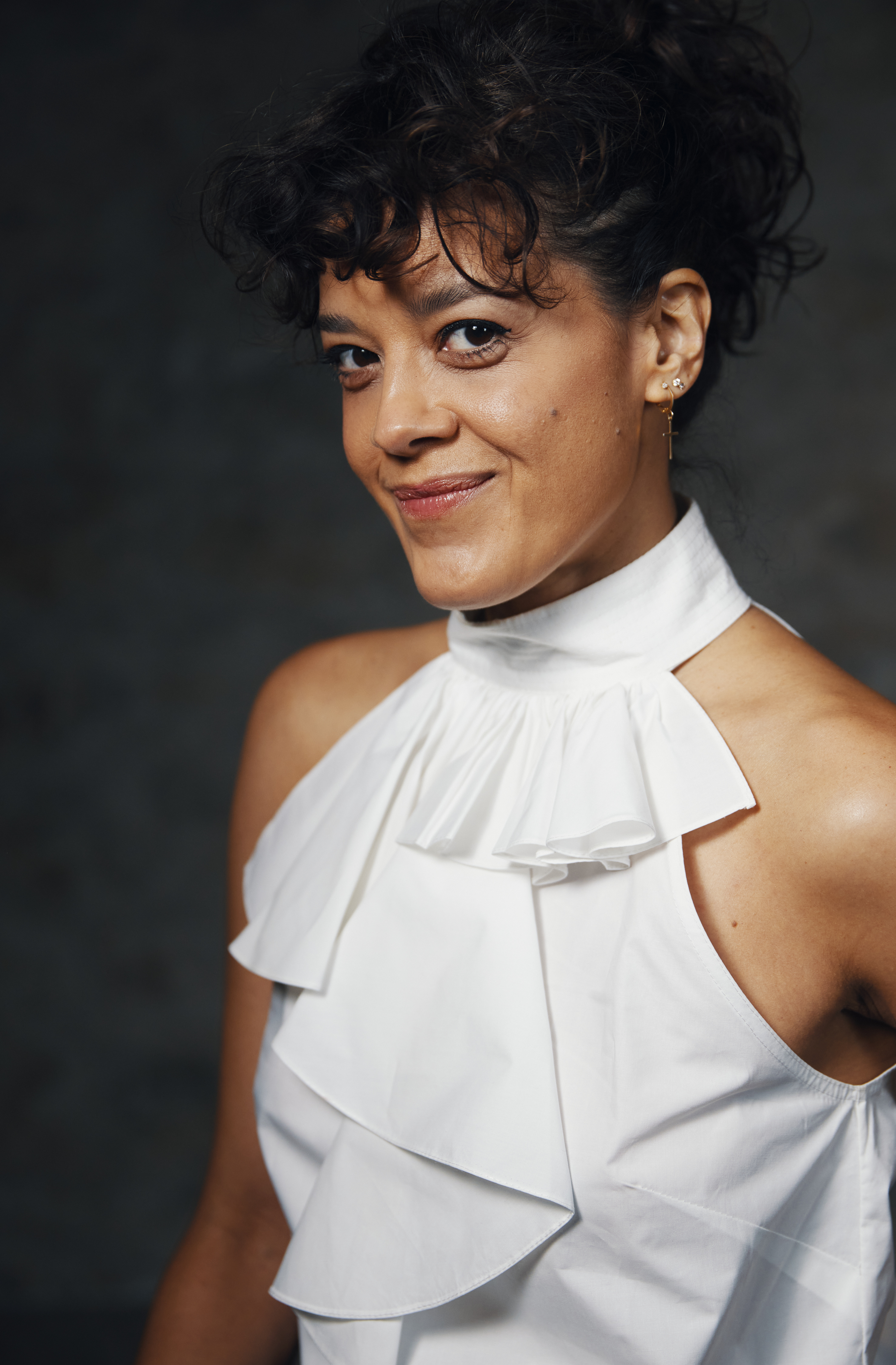
- Jinkings at the SXSW in 2024
- Born: 4 August 1976 (age 49); Brasília, Federal District, Brazil
- Occupation: Actress
- Years active: 2001–present
- Website: maevejinkings.com

Maeve Jinkings Melo Silva (born 4 August 1976) is a Brazilian actress.

== Early life ==
Maeve Jinkings was born in Brasília, Brazil's capital, the daughter of a merchant and a photojournalist. At the age of five, she moved with her mother Leila Jinkings to Belém, Pará, where she grew up and graduated in Social Communication. When she was 22, she went to São Paulo to study drama at the CPT (Centro de Pesquisa Teatral – Center for Theater Research), headed by director Antunes Filho. She was also accepted at EAD – Escola de Arte Dramática (School of Dramatic Arts) of the University of São Paulo.

She is of African-Brazilian and Scottish descent, with some English ancestry from her maternal grandfather.

== Career ==
Jinkings' first experience in cinema was in the 2007 feature film Falsa Loura by Carlos Reichenbach. In 2009 she made a short film, Passageira S8º, in Recife. Her breakout was in 2011, with Neighbouring Sounds, directed by Kleber Mendonça Filho. She would work with Mendonça Filho again in Aquarius. With the 2012 production Amor Plástico e Barulho, she won the Best Actress Award in the 46th Festival de Brasília and the Brazilian Film Festival of Toronto. Jinkings also worked as a casting associate in the films Sem Coração and Big Jato.

Her debut on television was in 2015, in the Rede Globo telenovela A Regra do Jogo.

== Filmography ==
=== Cinema ===
Year	Title	Role	Note
2001	Dias	Dublê de Patrícia	Short film
2007	Falsa Loura	Ligia	
2011	Passageira S8º		Short film
2013	Boa Sorte Meu Amor	Juliana	
2013	Era Uma Vez Eu, Verônica	Paciente	
2013	O Som ao Redor	Bia	
2014	Estátua!	Isabel	Short film
2014	Loja de Répteis	Cláudia	Short film
2015	Amor, Plástico e Barulho	Jaqueline	
2016	Boi Neon	Galega	
2016	Aquarius	Ana Paula	
2017	Açúcar	Bethânia	
2017	Coiote	Esposa de André	
2017	Mato Seco em Chamas		
2017	Terra Treme		Short film
2018	Guaxuma		Short film
2022	Charcoal (Carvão)	Irene	
2023	Toll (Pedágio)	Suellen	

=== Television ===
Year	Title	Role	Notes
2015–16	A Regra do Jogo	Domingas Moraes	
2017	Cidade Proibida	Madame	Episódio: "3"
2018	Lama dos Dias		Participação
2019	A Dona do Pedaço	Zenaide Sobral Ramirez	
2023	The Others	Mila	
2025	Vale Tudo	Cecília Cantanhede	
