= Pictures of Ghosts =

- Theatrical release poster
- Portuguese: Retratos Fantasmas
- Directed by: Kleber Mendonça Filho
- Written by: Kleber Mendonça Filho
- Produced by: Emilie Lesclaux
- Starring: Kleber Mendonça Filho
- Narrated by: Kleber Mendonça Filho
- Cinematography: Pedro Sotero
- Edited by: Matheus Farias
- Music by: Tomas Alves Souza
- Production companies: CinemaScópio Produções; Ancine
- Distributed by: Vitrine Filmes (Brazil)
- Release dates: 19 May 2023 (Cannes); 24 August 2023 (Brazil)
- Running time: 93 minutes
- Country: Brazil
- Language: Portuguese

Pictures of Ghosts (Portuguese: Retratos Fantasmas) is a 2023 Brazilian documentary film essay written and directed by Kleber Mendonça Filho. The film revisits Kleber's hometown, the Brazilian city of Recife, through the historical prism of the cinemas he once frequented, based on his own personal archival footage, remembering what used to be idyllic places, now closed, that constituted an important time-marker in the evolution of Brazilian society.

The film had its world premiere at the Special Screenings section of the 2023 Cannes Film Festival on 19 May, followed by screenings at the Main Slate section of the 2023 New York Film Festival, and at the Wavelengths section of the 2023 Toronto International Film Festival. It was theatrically released in Brazil by Vitrine Filmes on 24 August.

It was selected as the Brazilian entry for the Best International Feature Film at the 96th Academy Awards, but was not nominated.

== Plot ==
The documentary shows how downtown Recife’s cinemas from the 20th century have mostly disappeared. The documentary presents it as a kind of archaeological site of sorts that reveals aspects of life in society which have been lost.

== Production ==
During seven years, while watching his own old videos at his office, on VHS, Betacam, and Hi8 cassettes, or on MiniDV, personal files and records which also contain photographs and audio recordings, Kleber began the film developing, also aiming to shoot new footage with modern equipment. Official production started in 2017, before the shooting of 2019's Bacurau, as a side project, with its own time frame.

== Release ==
The film had its world premiere at the 2023 Cannes Film Festival, in the Special Screenings section. Followed by screenings at the 2023 New York Film Festival, at the 2023 Toronto International Film Festival and at the 27th Lima Film Festival. It was also invited at the 28th Busan International Film Festival in 'Icon' section and was screened on 5 October 2023.

The film had its Brazilian premiere on 14 August 2023, in Recife, and was released in the rest of the country on 24 August 2023, by Vitrine Filmes.

== Reception ==
=== Critical response ===
Pictures of Ghosts has an approval rating of 100% on review aggregator website Rotten Tomatoes, based on 33 reviews, and an average rating of 8.1/10. Metacritic assigned the film a weighted average score of 88 out of 100, based on 8 critics, indicating "universal acclaim".

=== Accolades ===
Award	Date	Category	Recipient	Result	Ref.
Cannes Film Festival	21 May 2023	L'Œil d'or	Kleber Mendonça Filho	Nominated	
Lima Film Festival	18 August 2023	Best Documentary	Pictures of Ghosts	Won	
Chicago International Film Festival	22 October 2023	Gold Hugo for Best Documentary	Pictures of Ghosts	Nominated	
Valladolid International Film Festival	28 October 2023	Tiempo de Historia Award	Pictures of Ghosts	Nominated	
Valladolid International Film Festival	28 October 2023	Tiempo de Historia Second Prize	Pictures of Ghosts	Won	

== See also ==
- List of submissions to the 96th Academy Awards for Best International Feature Film
- List of Brazilian submissions for the Academy Award for Best International Feature Film
