= Thomás Aquino =

Brazilian actor

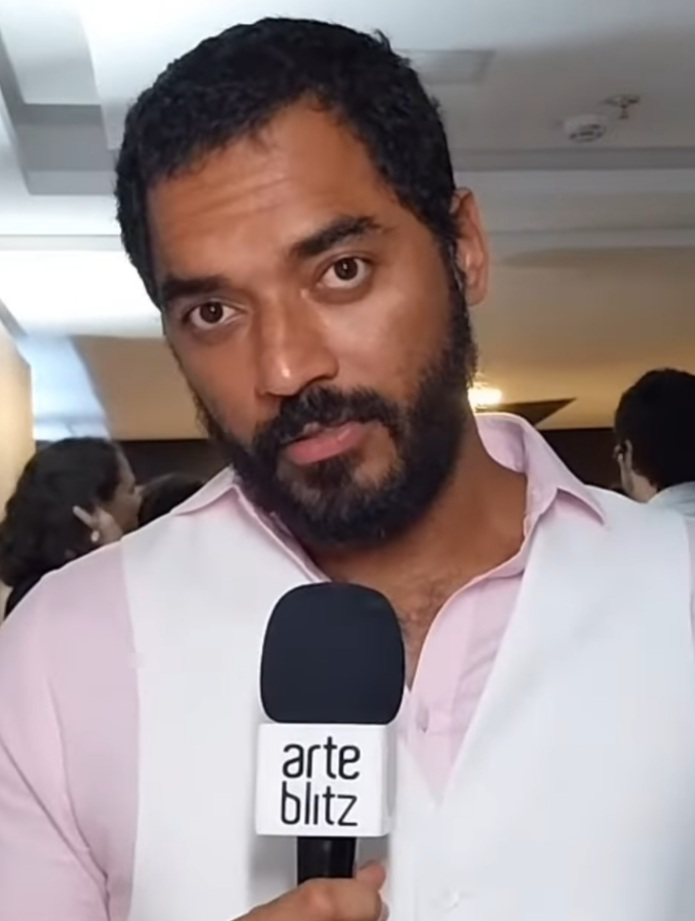
- Born: 26 April 1986 (age 40); Recife, Pernambuco, Brazil
- Occupation: Actor
- Years active: 2006–present
- Known for: Boca a Boca, Bacurau

Thomás Aquino (born 26 April 1986) is a Brazilian actor. He became known for the films Curral, Bacurau and the series Boca a Boca by Netflix. He won the Festival de Cine Iberoamericano de Huelva in the Best Actor category in 2020.

== Career ==
He started his career in theater in 2006, acting in O Grande Circo Místico. His film debut was in 2013, in the movie Tatuagem. Also in 2013 he wrote and produced his first solo project called Processo de Tudo which was based on the book, "Nao se pode amar a ser Feliz ao mesmo Tempo" de Nelson Rodriguez. He made his musical debut in 2014 in "Opera de Malandro" by Chico Buarque and in "Gonzagoa- A Lenda" which were both directed by Joao Falcao. He started his film career with the short film "Urbanos" Allessandra Nilo, awarded as the best short film byFESTin- Festival de Lisboa. In 2020 he won Best Supporting Actor Award at the Gramado Festival for his work on the feature film "Todos os Mortos". He also in 2020 he won the Best Actor award at the Festival de Cine Iberoamericano de Huelva for his performance in the film Curral.

== Filmography ==
=== Movies ===
Year	Title	Role	Notes
2013	Tatuagem	Traficante	
2014	Urbanos	Cadu	Short film
2014	Praia do Futuro	Jefferson	
2019	Bacurau	Pacote (Acácio)	
2020	Todos os Mortos	Eduardo	
2020	Noite Quente	Lobisomem	Short film
2021	Serial Kelly	Cop Lindolhar	
2021	Curral	Chico Caixa	
2023	Toll (Pedágio)		
2025	The Secret Agent	Valdemar	

=== Television ===
Year	Title	Role	Notes
2026	Man on Fire	Prado Soares	
2026	Coração Acelerado	Ronei Soares	
2025	Guerreiros do Sol	Josué Alencar	
2025	Vale Tudo	Mário Sérgio	
2023–2026	The Others	Amâncio Costa Gonçalves	24 episodes
2021	Manhãs de Setembro	Ivaldo	5 episodes
2020	Boca a Boca	Maurílio	6 episodes
2019	O Doutrinador	Beto	7 episodes
2018	3%	Renan	2 episodes
2017	Treze Dias Longe do Sol	Reinaldo	7 episodes

== Awards and nominations ==
Year	Award	Category	Work	Result	Ref.
2020	48º Festival de Gramado	Troféu Kikito de Melhor Ator Coadjuvante	Todos os Mortos	Won	
2020	Festival de Cine Iberoamericano de Huelva	Best Actor	Curral	Won	
2011	Janeiro de Grandes Espetáculos	Best Actor	Cordel do Amor Sem Fim	Won	
2010	Bienal Nacional de Teatro Potiguar	Best Actor	Cordel do Amor Sem Fim	Won	
