= Falso Brilhante =

Studio album by Elis Regina
- Released: 1976 (re-released on 1999)
- Recorded: 1975/1976
- Genre: MPB
- Length: 35:15
- Label: PolyGram/Philips/Universal (in Brazil); Verve Records (in the U.S.)
- Producer: Mazola

Elis Regina chronology
Elis & Tom (1974)	Falso Brilhante (1976)	Elis (1977)

Professional ratings
Review scores
Source	Rating
Allmusic	4.5/5 stars

Falso Brilhante (English: Fake diamond) is a 1976 studio album released by the critically acclaimed Brazilian MPB singer Elis Regina.

On the year of 1975 Elis Regina opened her solo concert entitled Falso Brilhante, where she launched the career of a new composer, Antonio Carlos Belchior, (with his songs "Como Nossos Pais" and "Velha Roupa Colorida"). One year after that concert, she recorded part of the repertoire of the show and released on an LP. This LP was later reissued as a CD in 1999. It was listed by Rolling Stone Brazil as one of the 100 best Brazilian albums in history. The magazine also elected the song "Como Nossos Pais" as the 43rd greatest Brazilian song.

== Track listing ==
1. "Como Nossos Pais" (Antonio Carlos Belchior) – 4:21
2. "Velha Roupa Colorida" (Antonio Carlos Belchior) – 4:11
3. "Los Hermanos" (Atahualpa Yupanqui) – 3:33
4. "Um Por Todos" (João Bosco/Aldir Blanc) – 2:24
5. "Fascinação (Fascination)" (F. D. Marchetti/Maurice de Féraudy, Portuguese version: Armando Louzada) – 3:01
6. "Jardins de Infância" (João Bosco/Aldir Blanc) – 2:49
7. "Quero" (Thomas Roth) – 3:43
8. "Gracias a la Vida" (Violeta Parra) – 4:23
9. "O Cavaleiro e os Moinhos" (João Bosco/Aldir Blanc) – 2:04
10. "Tatuagem" (Chico Buarque/Ruy Guerra) – 4:21
