= Aquarius (film) =

2016 film

- Film poster
- Directed by: Kleber Mendonça Filho
- Written by: Kleber Mendonça Filho
- Produced by: Saïd Ben Saïd; Emilie Lesclaux; Michel Merkt
- Starring: Sônia Braga; Humberto Carrão; Irandhir Santos; Maeve Jinkings
- Cinematography: Pedro Sotero; Fabricio Tadeu
- Edited by: Eduardo Serrano
- Release dates: 17 May 2016 (Cannes); 1 September 2016 (Brazil)
- Running time: 140 minutes
- Countries: Brazil; France
- Language: Portuguese
- Box office: $1.1 million

Aquarius is a 2016 drama film written and directed by Kleber Mendonça Filho and starring Sônia Braga as Clara, the last resident of the Aquarius building, who refuses to sell her modest apartment to a construction company that intends to replace it with a skyscraper. It was selected to compete for the Palme d'Or at the 2016 Cannes Film Festival.

The film generated uproar in Brazil due to its political connotations, especially because it was released at the apex of the country's political crisis. The film's cast and crew actively positioned itself against what they considered to be a coup d'état in Brazil, showing protest signs at Cannes.

A number of controversies were raised over the film, including its nonselection as the country's entry to the Best Foreign Language Film at the 89th Academy Awards by the Ministry of Culture’s committee, which has been seen as a supposed act of retaliation by Brazil's new government.

It was nominated for several awards, including the Independent Spirit Award for Best International Film and the César Award for Best Foreign Film. The film was included in a number of critics' lists of best films of the year, including from Sight & Sound, Cahiers du cinéma and The New York Times.

== Plot ==
In 1980, Clara and her family celebrate her aunt's birthday at the Aquarius apartment building in Recife after overcoming breast cancer that cost her right breast. In the present day, Clara, now a retired journalist and writer, is still living in the same apartment, but alone, since her husband died 17 years before and her three children have grown up and moved out. Her only constant company is her housekeeper Ladjane.

She refuses to accept a buy-out from Geraldo, head of Bonfim, a development company that wishes to acquire her apartment in order to replace the old building with a larger, more nondescript building, even though all the other apartments are already vacant and despite her own children's advice to accept the offer.

The developers, especially the proprietor's grandson Diego, an American-educated designer and head of the new Aquarius project, become frustrated with Clara's resistance and try to harass her into submission through a number of means, including throwing loud late-night sex parties at the apartment right above hers and burning mattresses in the parking lot. Eventually, in an open argument, she berates Diego that education without decency amounts to nothing.

Clara starts digging up dirt on Bonfim through her contacts. Also, she learns from two former employees of the company that Diego ordered termite nests to be installed inside empty apartments to force Clara out. With the help of her friends Roberval, a lifeguard, and Cleide Vieira, a lawyer, she breaks into some apartments and confirms they are swarming with termites.

Accompanied by her brother Antonio, her nephew Tomás (Pedro Queiroz) and Cleide, she goes to Bonfim to confront Diego and Geraldo over the dirty deeds and the termites.

== Cast ==
- Sônia Braga as Clara
  - Bárbara Colen as young Clara
- Humberto Carrão as Diego, the construction company representative
- Irandhir Santos as Roberval, a lifeguard
- Maeve Jinkings as Ana Paula, Clara's daughter
- Pedro Queiroz as Tomás, Clara's nephew
- Julia Bernat as Julia, Tomás's girlfriend
- Zoraide Coleto as Ladjane, Clara's housekeeper

== Reception ==
=== Critical reception ===
On Rotten Tomatoes the film has an approval rating of 97% based on 114 reviews, with an average rating of 8.10/10. The website's critical consensus states: "Led by a powerful performance from Sônia Braga, Aquarius uses a conflict between a tenant and developers to take an insightful look at the relationship between space and identity". On Metacritic, the film has a score of 88 out of 100, based on reviews from 22 critics, indicating "universal acclaim".

Peter Bradshaw, writing for The Guardian, awarded the film 4 stars out of five and called it "beautifully observed and surprising", "a richly detailed character study, immersing the audience in the life and mind of its imperious main character, Clara, who is addressed as 'Dona Clara', commandingly played by Sônia Braga", yet criticizing the film's ending. Jay Weissberg, in Variety, compared the film to Mendonça Filho's previous project, Neighboring Sounds, calling it "a more subtle film but no less mature, a calmer film but no less angry", and strongly complimented Sonia Braga's acting and Mendonça Filho's directing skills.

In Brazil, the film has engendered both standing ovations in cinema room and calls for boycotts. Major newspapers Folha de S. Paulo and O Estado de S. Paulo both lauded the film, with the first declaring that Mendonça Filho possesses an "absurd mastery of cinema", praising his camera works and use of sound and music. The newspaper also praised the film for its bravery in discussing Brazilian social issues. O Estado de S. Paulo declared that the film was "brilliant, a commendation to resistance" and "very pleasant to watch", while commenting on its submersion on political discussions.

=== Accolades ===
Award/Festival	Category	Result
Cannes Film Festival	Palme d'Or	Nominated
Cannes Film Festival	Queer Palm	Nominated
Sydney Film Festival	Best Film	Won
Transatlantyk Festival	Best Film	Won
Jerusalem Film Festival	Best Film	Nominated
Mar del Plata International Film Festival	Golden Astor	Nominated
Mar del Plata International Film Festival	Silver Astor - Best Actress for Sônia Braga	Won
Mar del Plata International Film Festival	Audience Award	Won
Mar del Plata International Film Festival	ACCA Award Best International Film Competition	Won
Lima Film Festival	Jury Award	Won
Lima Film Festival	Best Actress for Sônia Braga	Won
Munique International Film Festival	Best Film	Nominated
Zurich Film Festival	Best Internacional Film	Nominated
Independent Spirit Awards	Best International Film	Nominated
San Diego Film Critics Society	Best Foreign Language Film	Nominated
San Diego Film Critics Society	Best Female Actor for Sônia Braga	Won
Havana Film Festival	Best Actress for Sônia Braga	Won
42nd César Awards	Best Foreign Film	Nominated
Cartagena Film Festival	Best Film	Won

== Controversies ==
Aquarius has generated widespread controversies in Brazil and abroad. The film's political tone and its time of release have prompted public outcry, both of support and of criticism.

=== Protest at Cannes ===
During the first exhibition of Aquarius at the 2016 Cannes Film Festival, the film's cast showed protest signs written in Portuguese, English and French criticising Brazil's political turmoil at the time. The signs read messages such as "Brazil is not a democracy anymore", "Sauvez la démocratie brésilienne" ("Save Brazilian democracy"), and "Dilma, vamos resistir com você" ("Dilma, we will resist with you"). Immediate internet response followed, with supporters of Dilma's impeachment suggesting a boycott of the film. Among these, the right-wing columnist Reinaldo Azevedo wrote that "it is the duty of people of good will to boycott this film". Aquarius distributing company then used this sentence in the film's promotional poster, along three other positive quotes, in what was understood as an act of subversion.

=== Cinema protests ===
Aquarius was released in Brazil at the Festival de Gramado, when it provoked standing ovations and shouts of "Temer Out", a constant scream of protest in Brazil of those who criticise President Temer's controversial rise to power. After this, similar protests became common in Brazil at venues that exhibited the film. Those protests were commonly observed during the film's ending credits, with critics of Temer's administration shouting command words suggesting that the president took over the country by means of a "coup".

=== Film rating ===
Initially, the Ministry of Justice of Brazil gave Aquarius an 18 years old rating, attributed to sexual content and scenes of drug use. However, the criteria used to support the rating were challenged on the grounds that Brazil was the only country in which Aquarius had been, or was going to be, distributed to give the film such a rating, and that other more graphic films in Brazil had received less restrictive ratings. Protests ensued and, at the day of the film's premiere, the Ministry reduced the rating to 16 years old.
