= Emilie Lesclaux =

French-Brazilian producer (born 1979)

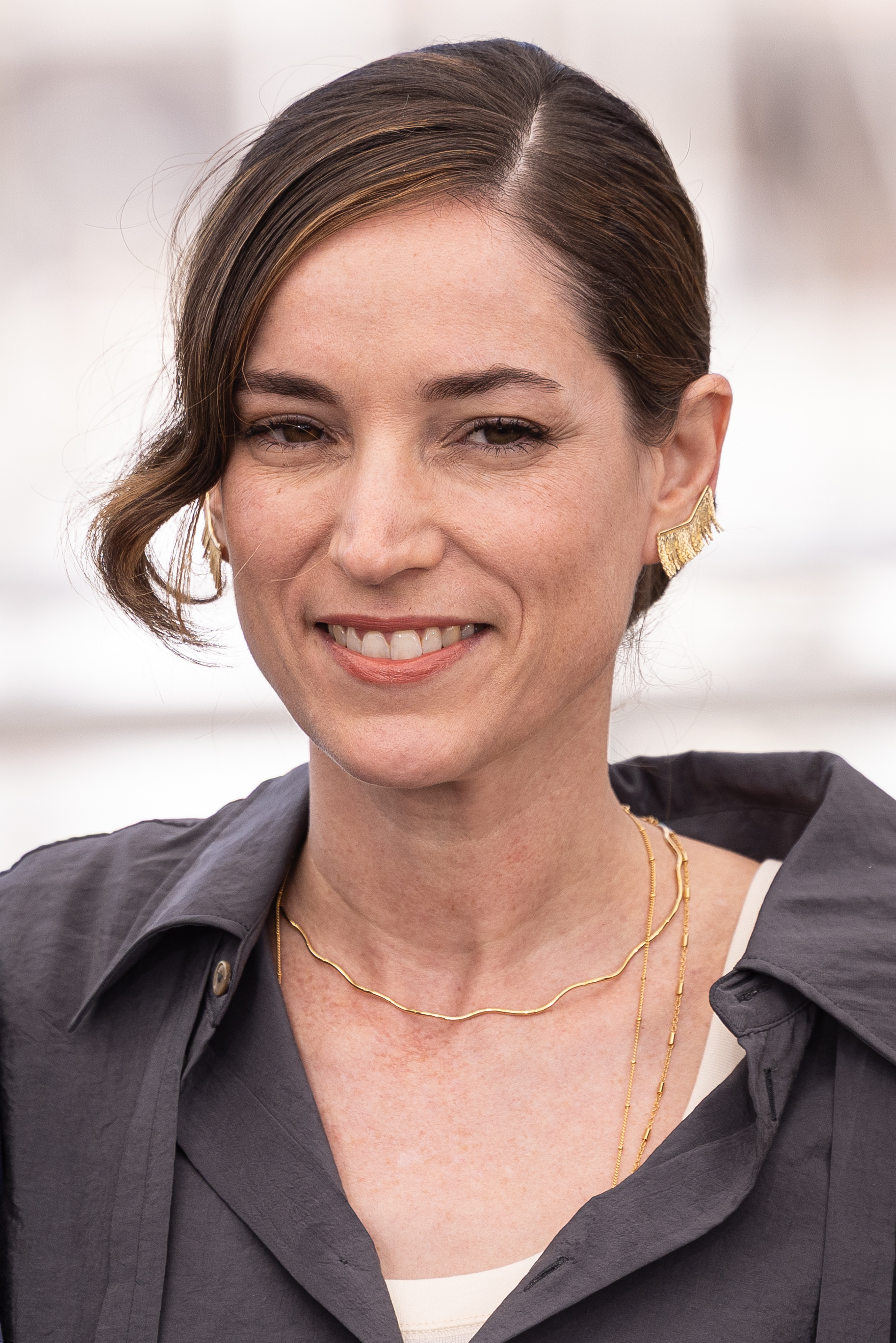
- Lesclaux at the 2025 Cannes Film Festival
- Born: 12 September 1979 (age 47); Bordeaux, France
- Citizenship: France
- Occupation: Producer
- Years active: 2004–present
- Spouse: Kleber Mendonça Filho
- Children: 2

Emilie Natacha Lesclaux (Bordeaux, born 12 September 1979) is a French producer. Most known for her collaborations with her partner Kleber Mendonça Filho in Bacurau (2019) and The Secret Agent (2025), for the latter she was nominated for the Academy Award for Best Picture at the 98th Academy Awards.

== Early life ==
Lesclaux was born in Bordeaux, France, on 12 September 1979. A graduate in political science (Institut d'études politiques de Bordeaux), she moved to Recife, Brazil, in 2002 to work at the French Consulate General. She settled in the capital of Pernambuco, where she also began working as a film producer.

== Career ==
Alongside her husband Kleber Mendonça Filho, she created the CinemaScópio label, which produces films set in Pernambuco.

Her first producing credit was the short films Green Vinyl (2004) and Cold Tropics (2009), followed by the feature film Neighboring Sounds (2012), all directed by Mendonça.

Her produced films Aquarius (2016) and Bacurau (2019), directed by Mendonça, had world premieres at the main competition of the Cannes Film Festival where it were nominated for the Palme d'Or.

In 2023, she produced Heartless, directed by Nara Normande and Tião, the film was selected to the Orizzonti section of the 80th Venice International Film Festival.

In 2024, she produced Sleep With Your Eyes Open, directed by German filmmaker Nele Wohlatz, which follows the Chinese diaspora in Recife. The film was selected to the Encounters section of the 73rd Berlin International Film Festival.

In 2025, she produced The Secret Agent, also directed by Mendonça. The film had its world premiere at the main competition of the 2025 Cannes Film Festival. At the 98th Academy Awards she was nominated for the Academy Award for Best Picture.

Lesclaux and Mendonça at the 2025 Toronto International Film Festival

== Personal life ==
Lesclaux is married to Brazilian filmmaker Kleber Mendonça Filho. The couple has two children, twins Tomás and Martin. They live in Recife.

In 2016, she received the title of honorary citizen of Recife, officially granted by the City Council.

== Filmography ==
=== Feature films ===
Year	English title	Original title	Director(s)	Notes
2008	Crítico		Kleber Mendonça Filho	
2012	Neighboring Sounds	O Som ao Redor	Kleber Mendonça Filho	
2014		Permanência	Leonardo Lacca	
2016	Aquarius		Kleber Mendonça Filho	
2018	Azougue Nazareth	Azougue Nazaré	Tiago Melo	
2019	Bacurau		Kleber Mendonça Filho and Juliano Dornelles	
2023	Pictures of Ghosts	Retratos Fantasmas	Kleber Mendonça Filho	Documentary
2023	Heartless	Sem Coração	Nara Normande and Tião	
2024	Mr. Cavalcanti	Seu Cavalcanti	Leonardo Lacca	
2024	Sleep With Your Eyes Open	Dormir de Olhos Abertos	Nele Wohlatz	
2025	The Secret Agent	O Agente Secreto	Kleber Mendonça Filho	
2026	Yellow Cake		Tiago Melo	Co-producer
TBA		Leïla et la nuit	Fellipe Barbosa and Othman Zine	Post-production
TBA		Isolar	Leonardo Sette	Post-production

=== Short films ===
Year	English title	Original title	Director(s)	Notes
2004	Green Vinyl	Vinil Verde	Kleber Mendonça Filho	
2005	Eletrodoméstica		Kleber Mendonça Filho	
2007	Friday Night, Saturday Morning	Noite de Sexta, Manhã de Sábado	Kleber Mendonça Filho	
2008	Occident	Ocidente	Leonardo Sette	
2009	Cold Tropics	Recife Frio	Kleber Mendonça Filho	
2014	Heartless	Sem Coração	Nara Normande and Tião	
2014		A Feira	Kleber Mendonça Filho	
2015	The World Cup in Recife	A Copa do Mundo no Recife	Kleber Mendonça Filho	Short documentary
2019	Bacurau On The Map	Bacurau no Mapa	Kleber Mendonça Filho	Short documentary
2026	South of Tehran	Sul de Tehran	Kleber Mendonça Filho	Short documentary

=== Television ===
Year	English title	Original title	Director(s)	Notes
2026	Police Chief	Delegado	Leonardo Lacca, Marcelo Lordello and Tião	Miniseries
