= The Others (Brazilian TV series) =

2023 Brazilian television series

- Genre: Drama
- Created by: Lucas Paraizo
- Written by: Flavio Araujo; Pedro Riguetti; Thaís Fujinaga; Bruno Ribeiro; Dimas Novais
- Directed by: Luisa Lima; Lara Carmo
- Starring: Season 1: Adriana Esteves; Milhem Cortaz; Thomás Aquino; Maeve Jinkings; Eduardo Sterblitch; Letícia Colin; Drica Moraes
- Opening theme: "Concerto No. 2 in G minor, Op. 8, RV 315, "Summer"", Camerata Bern
- Composer: Antonio Vivaldi
- Country of origin: Brazil
- Original language: Portuguese
- No. of seasons: 2
- No. of episodes: 24

Production
- Production locations: Rio de Janeiro, Rio de Janeiro, Brazil
- Editors: Flávio Zettel; Fabrício Ferreira
- Production company: Estúdios Globo

Original release
- Network: Globoplay (seasons 1-2); TV Globo (season 1)
- Release: 31 May 2023 – 23 April 2026

The Others (Portuguese: Os Outros, stylized as OSOUTROS so that the letters "s", "o" and "u" stand out to form "sou" ("[I] am")) is a Brazilian streaming series produced by Globoplay. It was created and written by Lucas Paraizo in collaboration with Fernanda Torres, Flavio Araujo, Pedro Riguetti, Bárbara Duvivier, Thiago Dottori and Bruno Ribeiro and directed by Luisa Lima in partnership with Lara Carmo.

Revolving around conflicts among residents of a large condominium, its first season was released on 31 May 2023 on streaming to a positive commercial performance, being renewed for a second season even before the first one was completely released.

Its main cast includes Adriana Esteves, Eduardo Sterblitch, Thomás Aquino, Antonio Haddad, Maeve Jinkings, Drica Moraes, Milhem Cortaz, Paulo Mendes and Gi Fernandes.

The Brazilian Ministry of Justice changed the series rating from 14 to 16 years old due to the depiction of violence, sexual content and drugs.

== Plot ==
=== Season 1 (2023) ===
The story follows conflicts between neighboring couples Wando (Milhem Cortaz) and Mila (Maeve Jinkings); and Cibele (Adriana Esteves) and Amâncio (Thomás Aquino), which start with a fight between their sons Rogerio (Paulo Mendes) and Marcinho (Antonio Haddad), which escalate. Meanwhile, Sérgio (Eduardo Sterblitch), a former cop, sees the feud as an opportunity to gain some financial advantages while trying to care for his estranged daughter Lorraine (Gi Fernandes).

=== Season 2 (2024) ===
For two years, Cibele (Adriana Esteves) and Amâncio (Thomás Aquino) have been searching for Marcinho (Antonio Haddad). With Sérgio (Eduardo Sterblitch) out of prison, Cibele pressures him to reveal Marcinho's whereabouts. Meanwhile, Sergio improves his lifestyle by securing a spot at the local city council. He now lives at a high-end condo with Lorraine (Gi Fernandes), her son Juninho and his former wife and Lorraine's mother Joana (Kênia Bárbara), with whom he reconciled. His neighbors include Raquel (Letícia Colin), a religious woman yearning to be a mother and her husband Paulo (Sérgio Guizé), which sees ghosts from his past jeopardizing his marriage; Seu Durval (Luis Lobianco), a widowed cat lover addicted to games of chance; and Maria (Mariana Nunes), also a widow, who lives with her only son Kevin (Cauê Campos) and struggles with a major trauma.

== Cast ==
| Actor/actress | Character | Seasons | |
| Actor/actress | Character | 1 (2023) | 2 (2024) |
|---|---|---|---|
| Adriana Esteves | Cibele Costa Gonçalves | | |
| Eduardo Sterblitch | Sérgio Nogueira | | |
| Thomás Aquino | Amâncio Costa Gonçalves | | |
| Antonio Haddad | Márcio Costa Gonçalves (Marcinho) | | |
| Gi Fernandes | Lorraine Nogueira | | |
| Milhem Cortaz | Wando | | —N/a |
| Maeve Jinkings | Mila | | —N/a |
| Drica Moraes | Lúcia | | —N/a |
| Paulo Mendes | Rogério | | —N/a |
| Letícia Colin | Raquel | —N/a | |
| Sergio Guizé | Paulo | —N/a | |
| Luis Lobianco | Seu Durval | —N/a | |
| Mariana Nunes | | —N/a | |
| Kenia Barbara | Joana Nogueira | | |
| Stella Rabello | Detective Magalhães | | |
| Guilherme Fontes | Jorge | | —N/a |
| Raphael Logam | Marcelo Lima | | —N/a |
| Pedro Ogata | Souza | | —N/a |
| Rodrigo Garcia | Elvis | | —N/a |
| Magali Biff | Aurora | | —N/a |
| Ana Flávia Cavalcanti | Sandra | | —N/a |
| Gabriel Lima | Juca | | —N/a |
| Bruno Mello | Maradona | | —N/a |

=== Guest appearances ===
List
Season 1 (2023)
| Actor/actress | Character |
|---|---|
| Preto Viana | Beto |
| Cadu Fávero | Detective Tavares |
| Xande Valois | Maurício |
| Bernardo Schlegel | Alex |
| Alice Milagres | Mila (young) |
| Kelner Macêdo | Amâncio (young) |
| Gabriella Vergani | Cibele (young) |
| Gustavo Duque | Wando (young) |
| Ghael Marlon | Neighbor |

== Production ==
The project was conceived by Lucas Paraizo and entered pre-production in 2019, when he was working on Seasons 4 & 5 of Sob Pressão; however, the series was only announced to the public in January 2022 on Patrícia Kogut's column on O Globo, featuring Adriana Esteves on a leading role. Paraizo said TV Globo invited him to create something inspired by This is Us, which prompted him to think of something involving "Brazilian families" with an "emotional" appeal, following his work with Sob Pressão.”

Luísa Lima was assigned as the series director and had the films Parasite (2019) andElephant (2003) as inspirations. Thomás Aquino left the series O Jogo que Mudou a História to take on another leading role and was subsequently replaced by Rômulo Braga. Eduardo Sterblitch was cast in his first drama role as the former cop Sérgio. Guilherme Fontes was cast as Jorge, an entrepreneur linked to the 2016 Olympics in Rio who was arrested for corruption and is married to Lúcia (Drica Moraes), property manager of the condo that serves as the main setting of the first season. Magali Biff was cast as the mother of Mila (Maeve Jinkings). Ana Flávia Cavalcanti, Gabriel Lima, Pedro Ogata, Helena Quintella and Rodrigo García were cast as additional residents. Raphael Logam was in talks for a possible main role but was instead cast for a guest appearance only while focusing on a bigger role for O Jogo que Mudou a História and, later, working on Seasons 4 & 5 of Impuros. In February, Globoplay scheduled the first filming sessions for April. Shooting only began the following month, however, and concluded in August in Rio de Janeiro. The series had its first images shown at Rio2C.

A second season was confirmed even before the release of first one. It will be set in a different condominium and will feature new characters; with only a few returning characters from the previous season. Paraízo confirmed the return of Cibele, Sérgio, Marcinho, Joana and Lorraine, all played by the same actors as before, besides Thomás Aquino, who'll be returning as a guest with his character Amâncio. Mariana Nunes was the first new actress to be revealed - she will play a character described as a widow seeking revenge against a man involved in the death of her husband. Later, Cauê Campos was announced as Nunes's character's son. Letícia Colin was cast as Raquel, a religious real state agent, and Sergio Guizé was casta as her husband Paulo. Along with them, Luis Lobianco was announced as Durval, the property manager of the new condo. Raphael Logam left the series to work on Família é Tudo and Season 6 of Impuros.

== Airing ==
=== Promotion ===
The series had a première session by TV Globo for actors and the press on 29 May 2023, at Kinoplex Leblon Globoplay.

=== Streaming ===
On Globoplay, the series was divided in weekly blocks and two episodes were released every week (on Wednesdays and Fridays) through 7 July 2023.

=== Over-the-Air TV ===
The first episode was aired during Tela Quente (a Monday night movie session of Globo) on 26 June 2023 to tease the weekly releases on Globoplay.

In December 2023, Globo confirmed that the first season would be aired on their over-the-air channel on the first semester of 2024 following the end of Season 24 of Big Brother Brasil. The series premiered on 18 April 2024 and episodes were aired every Thursday.

== Episodes ==
| Series | Episodes | Originally released | | |
| Series | Episodes | First released | Last released | Network |
|---|---|---|---|---|
| 1 | 12 | 31 May 2023 | 7 July 2023 | Globoplay |
| 2 | 12 | 15 August 2024 | 5 September 2024 | Globoplay |

=== Season 1 (2023) ===
| No. overall | No. in series | Título | Directed by | Written by | Original release date |
|---|---|---|---|---|---|
| 1 | 1 | "Episódio 1" | Luisa Lima and Lara Carmo | Lucas Paraizo, Pedro Riguetti and Bárbara Duvivier | 31 May 2023 |
During a football match, Marcinho (Antonio Haddad) is brutally beaten by Rogério (Paulo Mendes). Marcinho’s mother, Cibele (Adriana Esteves), rushes him to the hospital and plans to report Rogério to the police, but her husband, Amâncio (Thomás Aquino), talks her out of it, dismissing the fight as just “boys being boys.” Meanwhile, Rogério’s mother, Mila (Maeve Jinkings), pressures his father, Wando (Milhem Cortaz), to speak to their son about the incident. Wando, frustrated after being fired from his job as a car dealer, reluctantly agrees and proposes they visit Marcinho’s apartment to apologize. However, during the conversation, Cibele loses her temper, insults them both, and even spits in Wando’s face. Furious, Wando storms out. Later, Cibele secretly vandalizes his car, which he had planned to use for a ridesharing service. Enraged, Wando forces his way into her apartment, only to be subdued by Sérgio (Eduardo Sterblitch), a former police officer and fellow resident. Wando is arrested. Afterward, Rogério threatens Marcinho following his father’s arrest. Cibele secretly purchases a gun from Sérgio, fearing retaliation from Wando.
| 2 | 2 | "Episódio 2" | Lima and Carmo | Paraizo, Fernanda Torres, Flavio Araujo, Riguetti, Duvivier, Thiago Dottori and Bruno Ribeiro | 2 June 2023 |
In medias res, Mila burns a picture of herself and Wando taken when they had just married, while recalling memories of their wedding and her mother’s vocal disapproval of Wando. She bails Wando out of prison, and he goes into town to find a job through a ridesharing app. However, he becomes frustrated upon learning that he needs to provide a clean criminal record, which he no longer has due to Cibele’s charges against him. Meanwhile, Cibele practices shooting with Sérgio. Amâncio visits Wando's apartment to talk to Mila. They exchange apologies for their partners’ behavior and agree to have Wando’s car secretly repaired. Rogério bullies Marcinho at their school's swimming pool, nearly drowning him. Later, he harasses him again in the building’s elevator. When Marcinho returns home, Cibele deduces what happened and confronts Wando and Rogério. During their argument, the gatekeeper, Elvis, reveals that Mila and Amâncio had left earlier with Wando’s car. As his parents discuss this, Marcinho goes through his mother’s wardrobe and takes her gun. Meanwhile, Wando and Mila argue over the situation, and he slaps her. An agitated Rogério is seen overhearing their fight. Mila leaves and runs into Amâncio, who encourages her to report Wando and later suggests she divorces him. The following morning, Wando wakes up in a panic, realizing Mila has left.
| 3 | 3 | "Episódio 3" | Lima and Carmo | Paraizo, Torres, Araujo, Riguetti, Duvivier, Dottori and Ribeiro | 7 June 2023 |
In medias res, Marcinho confronts Rogério at the condo’s court with his mother’s gun. Earlier, Marcinho had a conversation with his school’s principal, who encouraged him to report any bullying attempts from Rogério. Wando asks Rogério to persuade his mother to return home. He also deduces that she has gone to her mother’s house and tries to contact her there, but his mother-in-law sends him away. Amâncio interrupts his shift as an appliance dealer to call Mila and check on her. Meanwhile, Cibele realizes her gun is missing and seeks help from Sérgio, who expresses regret for selling her the gun. Lúcia (Drica Moraes), the local property manager and a widow, holds a meeting to announce Sérgio as the new deputy manager and to try to ease the tension between Cibele and Wando. Lúcia gives Wando the bill for a door he damaged while trying to attack Cibele, and he is shocked by the amount, claiming he cannot pay it because he is unemployed and unable to find a job due to Cibele’s charges, which she refuses to drop. Mila agrees to return home at her son’s request, which disappoints Amâncio. Later that night, Cibele discovers that the gun is missing, and Amâncio is upset that she bought it. They speak with their son's friend Juca (Gabriel Lima), who reveals that Marcinho plans to threaten Rogério with the gun. Cibele and Amâncio rush to the court, where Marcinho is already holding Rogério at gunpoint. In the ensuing argument, Marcinho accidentally shoots his own father.
| 4 | 4 | "Episódio 4" | Lima and Carmo | Paraizo, Torres, Araujo, Riguetti, Duvivier, Dottori and Ribeiro | 9 June 2023 |
In medias res, Cibele is seen in bed with another man, interspersed with flashbacks of Amâncio proposing to her. Back in the present, Amâncio survives the shooting with only minor injuries. Meanwhile, Wando presses charges against Marcinho. Cibele urges Sérgio to help them out, to which he agrees for R$ 50,000. Using his contacts, he persuades the local detective Tavares (Cadu Fávaro) to drop the charges and arranges a deal between the families: Cibele will drop the charges against Wando if he does not press charges against Marcinho. Cibele and Amâncio scramble to raise the funds to pay Sérgio, even selling their only car, but it’s still not enough to cover the debt. Eventually, Cibele visits Sérgio to assure him they are close to raising the total amount and begs him to ease their debt somehow. Amâncio speaks with Tavares, who warns him that it will be difficult to simply “let it go” due to the severity of the incident. However, the detective receives a call mid-conversation and tells him “everything’s sorted out.” Amâncio is left confused. Meanwhile, Cibele is seen undressing to have sex with Sérgio, visibly uncomfortable. Wando completes his training program and starts his ridesharing job. He proudly picks up Rogério as his first client and proceeds to teach him how to drive. Mila does Lúcia’s hair, but Lúcia reminds her that commercial activities are prohibited within the condo. However, she proposes a “partnership” and will allow Mila to continue her activities if she gives her half her revenue. Marcinho tries to visit Juca, but his mother, Sandra (Ana Flávia Cavalcanti), forbids him due to the gun incident. Cibele asks Sandra to forgive her son, leading the boys to reconnect. They go to the court and ask to join Rogério and his friends for a football match. They agree, but an uncomfortable Rogério leaves the court. Lúcia calls her daughter, claiming that her father “needs help,” that “he didn’t mean it,” and that “she feels so lonely.”
| 5 | 5 | "Episódio 5" | Lima and Carmo | Paraizo, Torres, Araujo, Riguetti, Duvivier, Dottori and Ribeiro | 14 June 2023 |
In medias res, Sérgio is seen distributing money to some men. Flashbacks reveal him being arrested by Tavares after attempting to falsely incriminate an undercover cop. Cibele reveals the sexual favor to Amâncio, which upsets him. Later, Amâncio secretly leaves a pizza box containing feces and urine at Sérgio’s door. Lúcia hosts a meeting to address the scandalous incident, during which Sérgio proposes that the condo hire armed guards (unbeknownst to residents, these would be business partners of Sérgio as part of a scheme). This would require residents to contribute an extra fee—a proposal that outrages many. Amâncio tells Cibele they should take some time apart, and a hysterical Cibele demands that he reveal his plans to their son. This leads to a heated argument, and Marcinho locks himself in his room without hearing the full discussion. Meanwhile, Sérgio and his accomplices plot to commit a crime within the condo to shock residents into accepting the security proposal. They kidnap Wando, hiding their faces, and force him to drive home. Meanwhile, Cibele takes Marcinho to visit Mila, and the mothers encourage their sons to mingle in Rogério’s room. The boys exchange awkward glances until Rogério says that "this isn’t going to work” and Marcinho challenges him to a video game match, during which they eventually have fun. Meanwhile, Cibele has her hair cut by Mila and discusses Amâncio’s intention to divorce, causing discomfort for Mila. Amâncio rents an apartment in the same condo and visits Mila, surprised to find his family there. Wando arrives with his captors and the gang holds everyone at gunpoint. Elvis spots the criminals on a security camera and calls Lúcia, who tells him not to call the police because she will handle it. However, she just lies on the sofa. Elvis calls the apartment, and Evandro asks him to call the police. Elvis hesitates and does nothing. Following the incident, Lúcia gains overwhelming support for Sérgio to deploy his private security operation.
| 6 | 6 | "Episódio 6" | Lima and Carmo | Paraizo, Torres, Araujo, Riguetti, Duvivier, Dottori and Ribeiro | 16 June 2023 |
In medias res, Lúcia visits someone in prison. Flashbacks show her, her husband (Guilherme Fontes), and some friends celebrating Rio’s selection as the host of the 2016 Summer Olympics. Wando confronts Lúcia, demanding compensation for his stolen car, but she dismisses him, saying the condo "has nothing to do with it." Wando vows to replace her as the property manager. He gathers some residents in an attempt to start a movement against her, but Lúcia joins the group and accuses Wando of trying to extort the condo. Lúcia seeks Sérgio’s help before Wando learns of their scheme. Sérgio "recovers" Wando’s car, but Wando remains determined to become the new manager. Lúcia offers him a three-month exemption from the security fee, but Wando rejects the offer, claiming he’s honest and suspecting a scheme between her and Sérgio, which he vows to expose. Wando investigates the condo where Lúcia previously lived and discovers she’s not actually a widow—her husband is serving time for corruption. Wando threatens to reveal Lúcia’s involvement in corruption. Mila intervenes, and the two argue. Rogério asks one of the new security guards (arranged by Sérgio) for help, and Wando recognizes him as one of his kidnappers, identifying him by a tattoo. Growing paranoid, he orders his family to stay in safe places only. Meanwhile, Lúcia visits her husband Jorge in prison and tells him they just need "a little more money." Jorge responds that they will bribe a judge to get him released. Cibele prevents Amâncio from seeing their child, stating that he’ll have to go through her lawyer first. Later, she calls Amâncio, telling him she took some pills and isn’t feeling well. Instead of helping her, Amâncio sees Mila and confesses his love for her, which surprises her. Cibele goes to the hospital alone. Sérgio’s daughter Lorraine (Gi Fernandes) visits him and asks to stay with him for a while until her mother breaks up with a boyfriend she dislikes. While walking around the condo, Lorraine stumbles upon Juca’s party, where Rogério tries to flirt with her, but it’s Marcinho who catches her interest. They smoke marijuana together and go to Marcinho’s room, where they attempt to have sex. However, Cibele arrives unexpectedly, interrupting them. Later, Lorraine is formally introduced to Cibele, who is horrified to learn she is Sérgio’s daughter and forbids Marcinho from seeing her again.
| 7 | 7 | "Episódio 7" | Lima and Carmo | Paraizo, Torres, Araujo, Riguetti, Duvivier, Dottori and Ribeiro | 21 June 2023 |
In medias res, Wando is seen lying dead on the floor. Flashbacks show a young Rogério on the verge of tears, but his father urges him not to cry and encourages violence instead. In the present, Wando grows increasingly paranoid and locks Mila inside their apartment. She calls Amâncio, who abandons his shift to pick the lock for her. He invites her to his apartment, where she cuts his hair, and they eventually have sex. Marcinho asks his mother if he can take the bus to school, but Cibele gives him money for a taxi instead. He plans to skip class with Lorraine, using the money for their day together. Cibele visits Marcinho's school and is shocked to find he isn’t there. She then heads to Amâncio’s store but is equally surprised to see him missing as well. As she leaves, she spots Marcinho and Lorraine at a shopping mall. The two hide in a fitting room to have sex but are caught by Cibele in the act. Lúcia pressures Sérgio to take action against Wando. Sérgio fires the tattooed security guard for exposing himself but gives him a lucrative new task: kill Wando. After dropping Rogério off at school, Wando notices the man following him on a bike. A chase ensues, and Wando knocks him off the bike, beating him to death with his own helmet. Later, Tavares finds the body and sends a photo to Sérgio. Enraged, Sérgio grabs his gun, but as he’s about to leave, Cibele knocks on his door, drops off Lorraine, and warns him to keep her away from Marcinho, delaying his departure. Wando picks up Rogério from school and tells him to pack for a “trip”. When they arrive home, they are horrified to find the door picked and the apartment empty. Wando steps out onto the balcony and sees Mila and Amâncio making out at Amâncio’s apartment. Wando calls Mila, lying that he’s on his way home, and Mila lies in return, claiming she’s still there. Wando locks Rogério in his room and tries to assault Mila when she arrives. Rogério breaks out and tries to stop his father, but accidentally pushes him over the balcony balustrade. Wando falls to his death, witnessed by a shocked Amâncio, a devastated Lúcia, and a satisfied Sérgio. Lúcia later visits her daughter Renata, asking for help. Renata harshly rejects her, expressing frustration at living with her mother-in-law, being out of favor, and having people gossip about her father’s imprisonment for corruption.
| 8 | 8 | "Episódio 8" | Lima and Carmo | Paraizo, Torres, Araujo, Riguetti, Duvivier, Dottori and Ribeiro | 23 June 2023 |
In medias res, Rogério takes Tavares’s gun at the precinct and demands the release of his mother. In flashbacks, a younger Rogério and his mother meet with the school principal to discuss him threatening classmates with toy weapons. Back in the present, Mila takes the blame for Wando’s death to prevent her son from going to jail, and Rogério is temporarily adopted by his grandmother. After Mila gives her testimony at the precinct, Amâncio warns her that she shouldn’t have done it without a lawyer. Rogério’s grandmother comments that he and Mila are "better off without Wando," which angers Rogério, and he asks her to leave. Later, Amâncio comforts him and takes him to his apartment. Cibele finds out and invites both to her place. The next morning, Rogério asks to visit his mother, and Amâncio takes him to the precinct. There, in a moment of distraction, Rogério grabs Tavares’s gun and orders him to release Mila. Other officers subdue him, and Rogério confesses that he is the one who killed his father. Meanwhile, Lorraine visits Marcinho, and they finally have sex in his mother’s bed. Cibele finds out and talks to Amâncio about their son’s early sexual experiences. Lúcia collects her payment from Sérgio but complains it’s not too much. Sérgio reminds her that it's her responsibility to convince residents to pay even higher fees. When Lúcia fails to do so at the next condo meeting, Sérgio retaliates by secretly killing her dog, Gigi.
| 9 | 9 | "Episódio 9" | Lima and Carmo | Paraizo, Torres, Araujo, Riguetti, Duvivier, Dottori and Ribeiro | 28 June 2023 |
In media res, Marcinho is seen on stage, preparing to dance some funk carioca before an audience. In flashbacks, a young Marcinho plays Bach’s Partita in A minor for solo flute on the piano, much to Cibele's pride in their apartment. Back to the present, Cibele takes Marcinho and Lorraine to the shopping mall. Amâncio spots them and asks his boss for a few moments off. Fed up with his frequent absences, the boss warns him that if he leaves, his job will be hanging in the balance. Amâncio goes anyway and questions Cibele about allowing their son's relationship with Lorraine. Cibele believes Marcinho will eventually lose interest in the girl and that forbidding their meetings will only encourage further rebellion. Meanwhile, Mila is released and Rogério is acquitted following a deal arranged by Sérgio. Rogério tries to use his father’s car to earn money through ridesharing but is stopped by the police. He calls Sérgio for help, and Sérgio pays him to keep an eye on his daughter. Lúcia, still grieving over her dog’s death, asks her husband to help avenge it. He arranges a meeting with a hitman, and Lúcia instructs him to kill Lorraine. The hitman tracks the girl to a local baile funk. Just as he is about to stab her, Sérgio arrives, subdues him, threatens Marcinho against seeing his daughter, and takes her away.
| 10 | 10 | "Episódio 10" | Lima and Carmo | Paraizo, Torres, Araujo, Riguetti, Duvivier, Dottori and Ribeiro | 30 June 2023 |
In media res, Lorraine and Marcinho witness an explosion. In flashbacks, Lorraine hugs her father proudly after he receives an award as a police officer. Back in the present, Sérgio forbids Lorraine from leaving home and has Rogério keep watch over her. At the precinct, Sérgio tortures the hitman into confessing who hired him. Later, he confronts Lúcia at the condo’s meeting, hinting that he knows everything. Meanwhile, Marcinho tries to see Lorraine but is physically abused by Sérgio for his efforts. Lúcia tells her husband to pack so they can leave quickly. While they sleep, Sérgio sneaks into their apartment and causes a gas leak. The next morning, when Lúcia tries to light the stove, the apartment explodes. Cibele tries to dye her son's hair, but he dislikes the result and they go to Mila to have it fixed. There, Cibele discovers Amâncio’s toolbox and deduces they're having an affair. She creates a scene at Amâncio’s workplace, leading to his firing, and another at the condo meeting, where she publicly accuses Mila of “destroying her family.” Sandra suggests they go to a nightclub to forget their problems. At the nightclub, Cibele hooks up with Marcelo, a friend of Sandra, and returns home with him. Meanwhile, Marcinho and Lorraine, who has stolen her father's gun and some cash, run away. After the explosion, they encounter Cibele and flee. Mila breaks up with Amâncio, citing their different lives and her need to focus on her son.
| 11 | 11 | "Episódio 11" | Lima and Carmo | Paraizo, Torres, Araujo, Riguetti, Duvivier, Dottori and Ribeiro | 5 July 2023 |
In media res, Marcinho is seen crying and slowly walking away from a blurred figure at night. Flashbacks reveal that Cibele and Amâncio had a son before Marcinho, who died as a toddler from an undisclosed accident. Back in the present, Sérgio takes over as the property manager. Amâncio and Cibele consult Detective Magalhães (Stella Rabello) about Marcinho’s escape. She tries to search Sérgio’s apartment, but he refuses until she has a mandate. Later, Sérgio visits Lorraine’s mother, Joana (Kênia Bárbara), to inquire about Lorraine’s whereabouts. Sérgio puts all the weapons in his apartment in a bag and asks Rogério to store it somewhere safe without revealing its contents. Rogério puts it in his father’s car trunk. Mila, intending to sell the car and invest in a beauty salon, finds the bag while showing the car to Sandra. She confronts Rogério about the bag and he admits he is working for Sérgio. Marcinho takes Lorraine to his childhood home in Lapa. There, Lorraine reveals that Sérgio is a miliciano. Feeling unwell, she visits a doctor and discovers she’s pregnant. Meanwhile, Cibele and Amâncio deduce that Marcinho went to their old house and head there just before Marcinho and Lorraine arrive, but they narrowly escape before they're spotted. The pair goes to Joana’s. Mila blackmails Sérgio about the guns, demanding R$ 200,000. Rogério joins a match at the condo’s court at the expense of Juca's spot in the team and he locks Rogério inside and exposes his mother’s affair with Amâncio, humiliating him. Rogério confronts his mother about the affair, leading to an argument. Sérgio goes to Joana’s to collect his daughter. Marcinho holds him at gunpoint but fails to shoot. Lorraine reveals her pregnancy, and Sérgio abducts Marcinho. Later that night, at a remote location, Marcinho kneels, begging for his life, as Sérgio’s gun is seen firing a shot.
| 12 | 12 | "Episódio 12" | Lima and Carmo | Paraizo, Torres, Araujo, Riguetti, Duvivier, Dottori and Ribeiro | 7 July 2023 |
A group led by Cibele and Amâncio searches for Marcinho, with the couple wearing T-shirts with pictures of him and Lorraine. Detective Magalhães questions Rogério, who denies knowing anything. Later, Rogério sneaks into Sérgio’s trunk and records him calling Tavares to plot an attack against Magalhães, sending the file to Magalhães soon after. Sérgio collects Lorraine and says they’ll meet Marcinho and his mother at a clinic. Magalhães, Cibele, Amâncio and Mila head to the clinic, where Rogério sneaks out of the car before Magalhães arrives and orders everyone to stay put. Lorraine prepares for an examination, and Joana questions Sérgio about proceeding without Lorraine’s consent. Cibele is too anxious and ends up entering the doctor's office before Magalhães, causing Sérgio to flee and take Mila hostage to ensure his escape. At the precinct, Magalhães collects testimonies from Lorraine, Mila, Rogério and Cibele. Sérgio’s apartment is searched, Tavares is arrested, and Sérgio is captured at his hideout. He tells Magalhães he doesn’t know Marcinho’s whereabouts. Mila finishes setting up her salon, and Rogério asks to work there as a barber. Mila teaches him how to shave. Amâncio visits the salon and announces that he and Cibele are moving out of the condo. He asks if she regrets their involvement, and she says their story changed her. Amâncio expresses his happiness that they will follow their own paths and she wishes him luck in finding his son. Cibele visits Sérgio in prison, asking about Marcinho. Sérgio again claims not to know and exchanges threats with her for when he gets out. Cibele and Amâncio move back to their old house. Some time later, they host Joana and Lorraine for lunch and discuss the upcoming child. Cibele receives a call with no one on the other end and believes it was Marcinho. The scene then shows Marcinho walking among a crowd at a bus station.

=== Season 2 (2024) ===
| No. overall | No. in series | Título | Directed by | Written by | Original release date |
|---|---|---|---|---|---|
| 14 | 1 | "Episódio 1" | TBA | TBA | TBA |
| 14 | 2 | "Episódio 2" | Lima, Carmo and Rodrigo | Paraizo, Araújo, Riguetti, Ribeiro and Fujinaga | 15 August 2024 |
Sérgio thanks Raquel for saving his grandson and she invites Lorraine to her religious meetings. Raquel takes her to a shopping mall where she has a chance to secretly meet Marcinho, and he suggests they run away. Later, Lorraine confides her plans to Raquel and she initially intends to help the girl, but Paulo tells her to stop trying to solve other people's problems and she ends up alerting Sérgio, who catches the couple in the garage at night just before they could make it. Sérgio holds Marcinho at gunpoint, but Raquel knocks at the door and he is forced to stand down. In another moment, Sérgio and Tavares eat in a restaurant and discuss some profitable possibilities in Sérgio's new condo. As they leave, Cibele attempts to run over Sérgio, but is arrested by Tavares, who lets her off in the end. Later, a restraining order is imposed on Cibele against Sérgio. Maria learns that Paulo is a fan of a virtual reality game and she decides to join the game, where she eventually meets and interacts with his avatar.
| 15 | 3 | "Episódio 3" | Lima, Carmo and Rodrigo | Paraizo, Araújo, Riguetti, Ribeiro and Fujinaga | 15 August 2024 |
Sérgio announces to his family that Marcinho will movo in to live with them. Meanwhile, he searches for a second house at the condo for the young couple, while secretly looking to turn it into his HQ for the new business venture with Tavares. He even requests help from Raquel, but the one house that interested him is already taken. Later, he recruits Marcinho for a secret job - to capture an alligator, which he plants in the desired house to discourage the other interested party from renting it. After the successful capture, they share an enthusiastic hug. However, when Marcinho attempts to reconnect with his mother, Sérgio prevents him. Paulo and Raquel go to a fertility clinic, where he is devastated to find out he's infertile. Cibele is frustrated to find out the police is no longer actively looking for Marcinho, but renews her hopes after receiving a call from Marcinho's former landlord and visiting her son's apartment with Amâncio.
| 16 | 4 | "Episódio 4" | Unknown | Unknown | 15 August 2024 |
In media res, Raquel is seen carrying Juninho and singing a lullaby. In flashbacks, she visits Paulo in an abandoned building where he lives as a homeless person. Back to the present, Paulo faints during a lesson in his gym and is brought back home. After he recovers, he returns to the fertility clinic where the doctor reassures there's a "99% chance" that he's infertile. Sérgio asks for another shot so he can be sure, claiming his marriage depends on it, and when he closes himself in a room to collect his sperm. Raquel suggests they adopt a child instead, but he rejects the idea, claiming that it will "only increase his failure". Sérgio locks Joana in her room, leaves Juninho with Marcinho and orders hum not to open the door. Later, Lorraine arrives, hears her mother's screams, unlocks the door, reprehends Marcinho for not helping her (he claims he was just following Sérgio's orders) and takes her mother to the police station for her to report Sérgio. However, Joana lets fear get he best of her and gives up. While they're out, Amâncio comes to deliver a gift to Juninho. Marcinho remotely lets Amâncio in the condo, unaware of the visitor's identity, and almost opens the door, but gives up after hearing his father's voice. Amâncio just leaves the package and goes away. Meanwhile, Sérgio and Tavares have to find a last-minute replacement for a job. Sérgio calls Marcinho and orders him to come. The boy intends to take Juninho with him, but Raquel sees him and offers to take care of the child while he's out. She takes the child to a drugstore and meets Amâncio, who doesn't recognize Juninho but comments that "his look reminds me of my son". Meanwhile, the job Sérgio recruited Marcinho for is to steal a truck full of merchandise; Marcinho is nearly killed during the heist, but Sérgio shoots his attacker. Joana and Lorraine arrive home and are desperate not to find Juninho. They ask Paulo for help, and he is shocked to find the child with Raquel. Paulo collects Juninho and leaves, and she gets very upset. Cibele is happy to know Marcinho is alive, and concentrates her searching efforts in the favela where Marcinho lived. Maria enrolls Kevin in Paulo's gym because she believes her son needs to get some muscle, but later Kevin rejects the idea and says that "Paulo is married and loves his wife", to which Maria replies that she also loved his father.
| 17 | 5 | "Episódio 5" | Unknown | Unknown | 15 August 2024 |
In media res, someone enters Cibele's house and she is shocked to see the person. In flashbacks, Marcinho is seen finding the apartment he rented. Back to the present, Sérgio gifts him with a weapon, claiming he'll need it to protect himself. Sérgio is also planning an opening party for his illegal casino. Eventually, he, Tavares and Marcinho have a meeting at a local restaurant and Amâncio and Cibele also go there. Sérgio manages to successfully hide Marcinho from his mother and has a brief argument with her. Later, he asks Marcinho to "handle" Cibele so she stops stalking them. Eventually, Sérgio receives a call from an old woman who says he "can't leaver her in that place", to which he replies that he hopes she stays there until she dies. A nurse collects the phone and apologizes for the call, and Sérgio angrily reminds them he doesn't want to be bothered. Joana decides to report Sérgio to sheriff Magalhães, but the latter says they'll need more evidence. At the opening ceremony, Joana walks around with a hidden microphone, allowing Magalhães to listen to the conversations around her. Raquel apologizes to Lorraine, but Lorraine angrily says she should go after raising a child of her own. Lorraine and Kevin befriend each other and Kevin teaches her to play the theremin, and they almost kiss. Soon later, Maria engages in a virtual sexual activity with Paulo in their VR game, and both Kevin and Lorraine secretly witness the act. Later, Raquel finds Paulo's VR console, operates it, finds out about his affair (though still unaware it involves Maria) and expels him. Lorriane and Marcinho have an argument and Lorraine says she finds it strange that Marcinho seems uninterested in reconnecting with his mother. Later, Marcinho finally reveals himself to Cibele, says it's her fault their lives have gone off the rails and demands she stops looking for him. After he leaves, he is seen yelling out of frustration by a river.
| 18 | 6 | "Episódio 6" | Unknown | Unknown | 15 August 2024 |
In media res, Raquel wakes up in bed with Sérgio in an unknown apartment and leaves in a rush, scared. In flashbacks, Paulo is baptized. Back to the present, he sings a serenade to Raquel, who allows him back. Kevin visits the couple and says "what's happening between Paulo and his mother" is not doing any good to her. Raquel realizes Maria is the other woman, goes mad and drives to Maria's house, where Maria humiliates her. Raquel then leaves the condo with her car. Sérgio visits the old woman from the previous episode, who is revealed to be his grandmother who raised him as a child. He calls her "the worse person in the world", to which he replies that she "raised him to be a man and that he's not weak thanks to her". On the way back home, he finds Raquel by her broken car. They comment to each other how they're having a bad day. Raquel kisses him and they go to the apartment where the episode started. The morning after, she goes back home and forgives Paulo. Sérgio gifts Marcinho with a motorbike for his birthday and plans a party with his militia colleagues. Amâncio reports Marcinho's return to the police, but Magalhães says they cannot look for a person who doesn't want to be found. Joana sees a crying Amâncio at the precinct and reveals Marcinho's location to the sheriff. Also, Magalhães asks Joana to plant a hidden camera in Sérgio's casino. Lorraine expresses her disapproval of Marcinho accepting gifts from her father and celebrating his birthday with the militia men. Later, she skips the party, but Marcinho searches for her to hand her the first slice of cake (a common affective gesture in Brazil). When he finds her with Kevin, he throws the slice on his face and threatens him for coming close to her. Lorraine reprehends him and says she misses "the old Marcinho". Later at home, Kevin sees his mother packing. She says she'll go on a "retreat" and asks him to stay and behave. Cibele bakes a cake for Marcinho's birthday and Amâncio assures her he is not coming back. He then asks her what will become of them both and Cibele says she'd rather be alone, so Amâncio packs and leaves.
| 19 | 7 | "Episódio 7" | Unknown | Unknown | 15 August 2024 |
In media res, Durval hands his cat Dudu to Sérgio, who says he just have to "pay the ransom" to retrieve it. In flashbacks, Durval is seen mourning his deceased partner at a funeral until he hears a cat - Dudu - by the window, and decides to adopt it. Back to the present, Durval and Paulo call the police due to Sérgio's loud party. Tavares arrives and, in private, recommends Sérgio to keep it down. Raquel complains about it to Sérgio the next day and he responds by provoking her over their night together. Dudu escapes into Sérgio's house and Durval finds out about the casino. He asks to bet a little and promises not to tell anyone about it, while Sérgio warns him that if anyone finds out about it, he'll know it was him. Durval loses a great deal of money and ends up with a big debt, leading to the moment seen in the beginning of the episode. Sérgio hosts a barbecue for the whole condo to apologize for his noisy parties. In the event, he and Raquel briefly touch each other's hands. Eventually, he delivers a speech and provokes her. Later, Durval reveals the casino to Raquel, who storms in the place. Sérgio finds her and again provokes her about their night, this time threatening to tell Paulo everything about their time together. After the party, Joana secretly puts some sedatives in Sérgio's drink to avoid having sex with him. Lorraine and Kevin share a kiss. Raquel looks for Cibele on the internet.
| 20 | 8 | "Episódio 8" | Unknown | Unknown | 15 August 2024 |
In media res, Paulo meets Cibele at a hospital and asks a doctor how's Raquel. In flashbacks, he experiences drug withdrawal with Raquel by his side. Back to the present, Raquel visits Cibele after the latter puts her house on sale and reveals Marcinho's location. She invites her to spend some time at her place, from where she can keep a close eye on Marcinho, much to Paulo's disapproval. Raquel invites Lorraine back to her congregation, and Lorraine reluctantly accepts, but she brings a cake secretly stuffed with marijuana, causing all participants to laugh and speak nonsense. Afterwards, Lorraine and Kevin share a kiss, Marcinho secretly sees it and walks away desolated. Meanwhile, Raquel feels sick due to the cake and is taken to the hospital by Cibele, who meets a saddened Marcinho on the way to the car and asks him to accompany them. Marcinho reveals he and his friends had drugged the cake and also shows her a "Mãe" (mother) tattoo he now has on his chest. After Raquel recovers, a doctor reveals she's pregnant, shocking Paulo. Sérgio interrogates his team, Marcinho, Durval and Raquel over the camera and promises serious consequences to the traitor. Joana and Magalhães are revealed to be having an affair. Magalhães raids Sérgio's casino, but all illegal machines are gone - Sérgio managed to hide them all in Durval's house beforehand. Later, Joana finds Magalhães's car surrounded by cops and starts screaming and crying after seeing what's inside while someone films her desperation from a distance.
| 21 | 9 | "Episódio 9" | Unknown | Unknown | 15 August 2024 |
In media res, Maria takes Sérgio hostage and walks him out of a house in the condo while Cibele, Marcinho, Durval, Lorraine, Sérgio and Cibele watch and Kevin begs her to stop since she's not a murderer. Maria replies that Paulo is, because he killed Kevin's father. In flashbacks, it is revealed that, during a boat party, a drunk Paulo jumped into the water, but couldn't swim, prompting Nelson (Kevin's father) to attempt to save him, only to end up drowning himself. Back to the present, Paulo is infuriated to know Sérgio is the father. Cibele then takes Raquel back home with Marcinho. Meanwhile, Tavares shows Sérgio the images of Joana crying over Magalhães's death. Sérgio goes home, orders Joana not to leave but avoid making a scene after witnessing Cibele arriving at Raquel's house. Joana tells Lorraine they need to escape, but Lorraine won't leave without Marcinho, whom she can't locate. As she searches for him, she visits Kevin, who wants to talk about their kiss, but Maria suddenly returns from her "retreat". She says she took her time to "think about what she must do" and hands her son an HD drive full of images of Nelson. Sérgio sneaks into Raquel's house to question Cibele. Meanwhile and unbeknownst to them, Maria also sneaks in and holds Raquel at gunpoint. She ends up keeping all of them plus Marcinho hostage in the living room and orders Raquel to call Paulo, but he is buying drugs and doesn't answer the phone. Cibele reveals that Raquel is pregnant; Maria is confused because she's aware of Paulo's condition, and Sérgio asks her "when was she planning to tell him". Maria decides to call Paulo herself, and he finally answers and rushes to the house. Meanwhile, Lorraine and Joana come looking for Marcinho and Durval comes for Sérgio. Marcinho is allowed to leave and reveals the situation to everyone outside, prompting Lorraine to look for Kevin, who's emotionally watching his father's videos. Back to the house, Sérgio encourages Maria to kill Paulo at once and Paulo gets into a fistfight with him. Maria fires warning shots to stop them and Paulo suggests she takes him to the same boat to kill him. Maria walks him out and ignores her son's pleas, but Sérgio suddenly subdues her and asks everyone to leave because the situation is now solved.
| 22 | 10 | "Episódio 10" | Unknown | Unknown | 15 August 2024 |
In media res, an upset Joana reaches for a knife in a house without electricity. In flashbacks, a young Kevin tells his mother he wishes his parents stay together forever. Back to the present, Kevin is frustrated that his mother is now in jail and Joana grows increasingly scared as she believes Sérgio's men are stalking her. Marcinho reveals to Lorraine that he witnessed her kissing Kevin and says he's disappointed. Sérgio proposes to Cibele that she comes closer to their family and that he suspends the restraining order. Later, he has a cradle delivered at Raquel's house, much to Paulo's disgust, and Raquel asks Sérgio to stop, but he says he's "crazy about her" and tries to make out, but she resists. Durval finally raises all the money he needs to pay Sérgio, but Sérgio rejects it and says he'll stay with Dudu because it "brings him luck". A devastated Durval goes to Raquel's house for comfort, but only meets Cibele. After a talk, he gets up, says Sérgio "needs to be stopped" and walks outside as a storm comes. Soon later, a tree falls and hurts him. Sérgio, Marcinho, Cibele, Kevin, Paulo, Raquel, Joana and Lorraine join forces to lift the tree and rescue him. In Sérgio's house, Paulo reveals Raquel's pregnancy to everyone else, including Joana. He decides to go upstairs and release Dudu, but Sérgio goes after him, brutally beats him and encourages Marcinho and Kevin to do the same. Kevin refuses and leaves, but Marcinho obeys until his mother arrives and voices her disappointment. Paulo leaves with Raquel and Sérgio warns him that he "messed with the wrong guy". In their house, Sérgio says Raquel destroyed their marriage and claims the only way for them to be together is for Sérgio to die. He gets up and leaves, leaving a concerned Raquel behind. Meanwhile, the lights go out at Sérgio's house and he asks Marcinho for help fixing it. Durval tells Cibele he wishes Sérgio died electrocuted in his attempt. Meanwhile, Lorraine tells Joana she wishes her father was dead, but Joana replies that she's the one who's going to die. She picks up a knife and searches for Sérgio, but finds him dead on the ground.
| 23 | 11 | "Episódio 11" | Unknown | Unknown | 15 August 2024 |
In media res, Marcinho tells someone he knows who killed Sérgio and gets on his bike. In flashbacks, a young Sérgio captures a chicken and his grandmother Regina slaughters it in front of him after mocking him for his struggle in getting the animal. Back to the present, Regina watches the news, laughs at Sérgio's death and goes to the condo, where she pressures Tavares to solve the crime and treats Paulo and Joana as possible suspects. She also tells Tavares that Joana is unfit to succeed Sérgio in handling his criminal enterprises and suggests they form a partnership and "get rid" of her. Cibele tells Marcinho she plans to "reveal the truth"; in flashbacks, it is revealed that she went after Marcinho and Sérgio in their attempt to reestablish electricity and said her son would not put himself at risk. Sérgio grabbed her by the throat, and Marcinho rebelled against him, having his throat grabbed instead. A furious Cibele picked up a hammer and knocked him dead. Back to the present, Marcinho calls Tavares and asks to meet him at the precinct, where he'll reveal Sérgio's murderer. On the way there, he gets distracted by a billboard of Sérgio and crashes into a car.
| 24 | 12 | "Episódio 12" | Unknown | Unknown | 15 August 2024 |
Marcinho survives the accident, but loses his left leg. Tavares asks Cibele if she knows what he was going to tell him, but she denies. She later reveals her crime to Raquel, and so does Marcinho to Lorraine, leaving her extremely frustrated. Cibele asks Raquel to care for Marcinho and prepares to reveal the truth to Tavares, but Raquel takes the blame instead and is arrested. Cibele questions her and Raquel says she's just "caring for Marcinho". Paulo visits Raquel, says he doesn't understand her actions but will be waiting for her once she gets out. Cibele is later seen driving in the countryside with Marcinho and a bag full of money. Sérgio offers himself to care for Kevin, but he is still too angry as his mother. Sérgio then goes to the prison where Maria is just being released on parole. He takes her to a pier and begs forgiveness, which she denies. He then suggests she pushes him into the water, which she also rejects. She leaves, asking him to never contact her again. She returns to Kevin, who complains about having to take care of her despite him being the child and she hugs him, saying that now "it's over". Having lunch alone with Juninho, Regina chokes on a piece of chicken and dies. Tavares opens Sérgio's safe and is surprised to find it empty.

=== Season 3 (2026) ===
| No. overall | No. in series | Título | Directed by | Written by | Original release date |
|---|---|---|---|---|---|
| 25 | 1 | "Episódio 1" | TBA | TBA | TBA |
Cibele and Marcinho are on the run and adopt new identities: Tereza and Pedro, respectively. Amâncio catches up with them and finally reunites with his son, but the pair leaves before he wakes up in the next morning. Tavares is revealed to have followed him. Later, Cibele receives a call from him threatening to kill Amâncio if she doesn't return Sérgio's money. He has Amâncio talk to her as a proof of life and Cibele hears as they seemingly get in a fight, followed by the sound of gunshots. She hides the call from Marcinho, freaks out as she drives and crashes the car in a rural road. Meanwhile, engineer Roberto (Lázaro Ramos) is fired from his 27-year job and decides to use his termination pay and some last savings to buy a small ranch in the mountains near Rio de Janeiro to live with his wife Marta (Mariana Lima), who cheats on him with Álvaro (Leandro Ramos) and is reluctant about moving there. On their way to the new house, Roberto accidentally runs over a goose and decides to euthanize it and then dispose of its body near the road. As they arrive, they are greeted by siblings Geraldo (Pedro Wagner) and Patrícia (Carol Duarte), who respectively worked as a caretaker and maid for the previous owner. Geraldo shows Roberto the house's rifle, but Roberto refuses to bear it and doesn't even want his wife to know about the weapon. Later, Domingas (Docy Moreira), a neighbor, comes looking for the goose, which she claims is her pet. The couple initially lies, but Marta is overcome by guilt and soon reveals the truth. Domingas has them recover the body and bury it before taunting and threatening them with a rifle alongside her son Diego (Adanilo). That night, Roberto goes to town to have a drink and meets Geraldo and Patrícia by chance. Geraldo is too drunk and Roberto offers to take them home. Once there, Patrícia hugs Roberto to thank him for the help, but Geraldo wakes up and punches him out of jealousy. Roberto returns home and decides to leave with Marta to report Geraldo to the local police. As they drive, Cibele emerges and begs them to stop and help.
| 26 | 2 | "Episódio 2" | TBA | TBA | TBA |
A flashback shows Roberto and Marta on the day they met, in a job interview. Back to the present, Roberto rescues Marcinho from the crashed car just before it rolls down a slope. The couple takes him and Cibele to their house. On the way, they have another argument with Domingas and Diego due to her cows blocking the road. Later, Marta visits Domingas and tries to make amends, but Domingas says she needs to hear it from Roberto. Meanwhile, a pig belonging to Domingas wanders into Roberto's terrain and he builds a fence around it to prevent more invasions. Cibele reveals to Marcinho that his father is presumably dead. She asks Roberto for help recovering her belongings from the crashed car, but once they get there, he suggests they go back to get a rope. Meanwhile, Roberto fires Geraldo and Patrícia and it is revealed that they care for their elderly father Homero (Paulo Goya) in a humble house. Geraldo offers to help Cibele recover her belongings and he notices the bag full of money. He offers to keep it a secret if she helps him earn his job back. Cibele convinces Roberto to re-hire the siblings, much to Marta's chagrin. Dominga's pig gets hurt when trying to cross the fence and Marcinho offers to help take care of it. At Domingas's house, he tells her about his father and she offers both him and Cibele her condolences. Tired of the whole situation, Marta asks Álvaro to come pick her up and she leaves a broken-hearted Roberto. Tavares checks on a Amâncio's body, asks if any relative came to see it and bribes the technician to have it buried as soon as possible. He then tracks Cibele and Marcinho to the mountains and checks on the crash scene along with a local detective. Diego goes to the bar downtown to have a drink and vent off about his mother giving too much attention to animals and the "one-legged kid". Tavares is seen overhearing it.
| 27 | 3 | "Episódio 3" | TBA | TBA | TBA |
In a flashback, Diego is shown as a child moving with his parents into the ranch, where they expect to have a new and happy life together. Back to the present, it is revealed that the father died of an undisclosed reason, and that Domingas promised him to look after the animals. Tavares questions Diego on Marcinho's whereabouts, but Diego refuses to speak and leaves by motorcycle. Tavares pursues him, but he successfully hides in the bushes to escape. Back home, he vents off his anger on the animals and accidentally kills a baby goat called Dorinha. He discards the body in Roberto's terrain to incriminate him. The morning after, Roberto is found unconscious in his room after Geraldo forces the door open. Cibele awakens him, notices some medicine laying around and encourages him not to do it. As he recovers and prepares do have Marta's belongings incinerated, a furious Domingas shoots the house, seeking revenge for Dorinha's death. Cibele intervenes and claims she and Roberto spent the whole night together, providing him with an alibi. Marcinho calls Lorraine (Gi Fernandes), who tells him not to contact her again and that their son is better off without him. He questions his mother over having already overcome his father and pressures her to leave so they can avenge their father's death, but Cibele tells him he is "not a criminal" and suggests they stay for just another day to make sure Roberto is OK, since he also saved them before. Cibele hides the money bag in a cupboard. Patrícia finds the bag, returns it to her and claims she can "trust her", confusing and annoying Cibele, who buries the bag nearby to keep it even more hidden. Meanwhile, Domingas decides to spend the night at the barn with the animals to keep them safe. Tavares returns to the local bar and blackmails its owner Manoel (Bruno Garcia) into informing Diego's address. There, he forces the young man to reveal Marcinho's location. Tavares goes to Roberto's house, reveals Cibele's and Marcinho's real names and locks Roberto and Marcinho in a pantry while Cibele takes him to the money. Domingas hears movement around her property and comes searching for the source, providing Cibele with an opportunity to escape just as Tavares was about to execute her after securing the bag. Tavares is shot by Domingas in the ensuing gunfight.
| 28 | 4 | "Episódio 4" | TBA | TBA | TBA |
Domingas and Cibele bury Tavares's body and agree to tell everyone that he just collected the money and left. Roberto is disappointed with Cibele's deception and gives them a lift into town the next morning so they can leave. As Cibele buys tickets to Resende, Patrícia approaches Marcinho and insists that they go for a quick motorcycle ride before his mother returns. Romance emerges between them as they have fun together. Cibele asks Roberto for help finding Marcinho and makes a scene at Manoel's bar when she locates the duo. Roberto allows them to spend another night and suggests Marcinho may be truly happy there and that he is lucky to have her as a mother. Marcinho, who is overhearing he conversation, sheds a tear, but moves away as Cibele and Roberto hook up and pays Patrícia a visit. After locating Tavares's abandoned car, Diego pressures his mother to reveal what happened and she ends up telling the truth. Diego then collects the car, paints it blue and starts using it as his own. Marta returns with Álvaro (who is revealed to be their former next door neighbor) to collect her belongings but Roberto is furious that she brought him to his property and both end up punching each other. Marta separates them and goes into the house, only to find out about her objects' incineration, which she intends to question in court.
| 29 | 5 | "Episódio 5" | TBA | TBA | TBA |
Patrícia dresses up and applies make up for an undisclosed occasion and watches her father agonizing in his bed. In a flashback, she is shown hiding from him in order to escape a beating until her brother rises to protect her and takes the punishment in her place. Back to the present, she walks a dirt road and is approached by Diego, who nearly forces her to enter his car, lays on the ground to beg for her acceptance on her request, and then leaves alone after she denies again. Later, Roberto hosts a party in an attempt to ease up all animosities among the neighbors and invites Cibele, Marcinho, Patrícia, Geraldo, Domingas, Diego and Manoel. The latter fuels tensions among the guests with several personal questions and a drunk Domingas stir things up further by nearly confessing the truth about Tavares, before Cibele comes to calm her down. After learning of Roberto's profession, Manoel mentions that the local road is in need of improvements. Meanwhile, Patrícia takes Marcinho home to be alone with him. Diego follows them and steals Marcinho's prosthetic leg. Patrícia chases after him and he demands a kiss in order to return it; she concedes, but spits on his face after he insists she admits she liked it instead of honoring his part. He then runs into the woods and disposes of the leg for her to find on her own. She manages to retrieve it, but falls into a pitfall trap. Geraldo, Diego, Roberto and Manoel find her and Manoel says he'll report the trap to the local sheriff. Robert has Diego apologize to Marcinho and Cibele but the latter slaps him; Domingas witness the aggression and tries to intervene, but vomits and is taken away by her son. Geraldo reprehends Patrícia for bringing Marcinho home and she complains that she's never allowed to do anything and that she wants to leave, but Geraldo insists they cannot abandon their father. She then asks him how can he care for him after so many years of physical abuse and he replies that they should not be worse than him. Later, she witness her father agonizing again and takes her time before reconnecting his tracheotomy tube. Manoel is seen in a house surrounded by exotic animals in cages. Throughout the episode, Domingas has visions of Tavares calling her a murderer.
| 30 | 6 | "Episódio 6" | TBA | TBA | TBA |
In a flashback, a younger Manuel is seen complaining to his wife that his business, which has been with his family for generations, will probably go bankrupt. Homero approaches him with an "easy money" job as a poacher, but Manoel refuses, claiming he's honest, only to be called a "sucker" bu Homero. Back to the present, Manoel's pickup gets stuck in the mud while carrying some animals, but he is aided by the local sheriff, who is revealed to be earning a bribe from him. On the following day, Manoel hosts a community meeting in his bar and proposes that they improve the local road, which will require interventions in a small portion of Domingas's terrain, but since it is where she buries her pets, she denies it. Manoel tells Roberto he can fake a document to make it look like that part of Domingas's property is actually Roberto's, but Roberto refuses, claiming he's honest. Manoel pays Homero a visit and offers his children some money, claiming Homero "helped him a lot" in the past. When left alone with him, Manoel tells Homero that he has inherited his poaching business, and Homero is stuck in a medical bed, making him the sucker now. Worried that Tavares's body may be surfaced if the terrain is dug up, Cibele convinces Roberto to abandon the project for good. Marcinho vandalizes Diego's car and they fight, with Diego telling Marcinho that Patrícia is only with him out of pity (which she later denies). That night, Roberto, Marcinho, Cibele and Patrícia have dinner together. Diego throws a stone into Roberto's house, destroying a windows and injuring Cibele. Roberto goes to Manoel's bar to buy some first-aid products and Manoel insists on the project once again, claiming that they can even make the road separate his property from Domingas's. Roberto is finally convinced and the machines start working the following morning, revealing an old dead body, which Domingas claims belonged to her husband Américo. Marta is shown living a happy life with Álvaro and she suggests they quit smoking, but Álvaro reminds her that they got to know each other as they went out of their apartments for a smoke. Later, she finds Álvaro sharing a smoke with another neighbor and is furious with him. She concludes that they only work as an affair and that they should go back to their houses.
| 31 | 7 | "Episódio 7" | TBA | TBA | TBA |
In a flashback, Domingas tells 10-year-old Diego to repeat several times that his father is gone. Back in the present, both are questioned by the local sheriff before being imprisoned. Domingas claims that Américo fell from a tree and that she hid the body out of fear of being wrongly accused of killing him and leaving Diego virtually orphaned. Cibele feels indebted to Domingas and fears that her imprisonment will make it easier for the road to be built and for Tavares's body to be found. As a result, she uses her own money to bail them out of jail and bribe the local notary public to quickly obtain a copy of the original land deed, showing its true boundaries. With this, she finally convinces Roberto to abandon the project. Manoel asks the sheriff for help, but he says there's nothing he can do and leaves it with Manoel to handle alone. Manoel first tells Domingas that she is no longer allowed to shop at his business. Later that night, he secretly opens the door of her barn, setting all the animals free. With the help of Roberto, Patrícia, and Marcinho, they manage to retrieve them all. Despite everything, Domingas insists on staying. Throughout the episode, Patrícia insists that Diego opens up about his father's death, but he refuses. Marcinho grows jealous of it, but Patrícia reaffirms her affection for him. Cibele offers Manoel some money to forget about the project and later visits Domingas to reaffirm her support and urge her to tell the truth about Américo's death. Domingas reveals that he was actually run over by a tractor driven by Diego, who was learning to operate it. Meanwhile, Diego tells Roberto, Patrícia, and Marcinho the same story at the barn and returns to the house just in time to overhear his mother saying she cannot help but see "the person who killed the love of her life" in her son. Distraught, Diego attempts to hang himself and Marcinho—who had earlier shared his condolences, having also lost his father—comes to his aid.
| 32 | 8 | "Episódio 8" | TBA | TBA | TBA |
In a flashback, Geraldo proposes to his girlfriend and just as they celebrate, Patrícia learns that their father fell while drunk and didn't fully recover. Back in the present, Homero surprises the siblings by mumbling a few words. A doctor confirms that his condition may be improving and Geraldo goes to his ex-girlfriend Rosa's house to see her from a distance, but decides to leave without talking to her. Meanwhile, Patrícia panics over the possibility of reliving the abuses again. Geraldo calls Manoel under his father request and Homero questions him over "his" business, but Manoel says it's now his and calls him a "sucker" again. In a flashback, it is revealed that when Homero suffered his fall, he was with Manoel, who deliberately left him alone. Back to the present, Homero asks Geraldo to get revenge and Geraldo accepts. After drinking, he picks up his rifle and heads to Manoel's business, where he takes cover and aims his gun at Manoel as he's having an argument with Roberto and Cibele. Meanwhile, Diego survives the suicide attempt and decides to leave his mother. Marcinho comforts Domingas, assuring that Diego will return, and then goes ask Diego to reconsider, sharing that he once felt disappointed at his mother, too. The local sheriff tells Domingas that the case on her husband's death is concluded and both her and Diego are free. She has his body properly buried now, but only she and Marcinho attend the funeral. Diego later comes alone and asks his father for forgiveness. Manoel tells Cibele he'll accept the money, but starts interrogating her, suspecting of her determination to stop the project. He then offers her a job as an accountant. She accepts, much to Roberto's disappointment, and is asked to perform money laundering for him. Roberto tells Cibele he plans to report Manoel to the police, but she insists he doesn't. He goes anyway, but the local sheriff tells him to just "let it go". Roberto decides to take matters into his own hands and goes confront Manoel just as Geraldo secretly arrives to fulfill his father's request. Geraldo shoots sloppily and hits one of the three.
| 33 | 9 | "Episódio 9" | TBA | TBA | TBA |
Roberto catches Geraldo's bullet and Cibele rushes him to the hospital, where the medical staff demands contact with an actual family member. She calls Marta, who comes and tells Cibele to leave her house because she intends to reconcile with Roberto. She then tells him they both did wrong and should start over. Deducing the shot was an attempt on his life ordered by Homero, Manoel pays him a visit and forces him to drink cachaça until he dies. Domingas attempts to reconnect with her son, but he angrily tells her to leave. Geraldo tries to reconnect with Rosa, but she tells him they're done and asks him not to come back. Patrícia asks Marcinho to leave with her, but he doesn't want to leave his mother. She recurs to Diego instead, but just as they are leaving without saying farewell to anyone, they find a distraught Geraldo on the road, who informs them of his father's death. Cibele confesses to Domingas that she killed someone and another person (Raquel) took the blame, and that she can't stop thinking about it. Raquel is then shown going into labor in prison.
| 34 | 10 | "Episódio 10" | TBA | TBA | TBA |
In a flashback, Raquel is shown being baptized as a Protestant. Back to the present, a social assistant informs her that she can only keep her baby Vitória for six months, after which she shall be adopted by a next of kin, but Raquel is adamant about raising her child even in prison. She is also seen having visions of Sérgio. She later asks the assistant to contact Lorraine, who comes but shows reluctance about raising Vitória. Raquel confesses she took the blame as a "mission", but didn't believe she would be found guilty. Now, she wants Cibele to turn herself in and asks Lorraine to track her and Marcinho. Lorraine manages to locate them and says she intends to go there. Meanwhile, the local sheriff tells Manoel he is growing tired of "cleaning up his mess" and Manoel reminds him he's getting a "good pay" for that. He also insists on going to Homero's funeral in order not to raise suspicions. Everyone wonders how Homero was able to reach for a bottle and Manoel encourages them to focus on finding out who shot Roberto instead. At the funeral, tension grows among neighbors, with Roberto willing to confront Manoel again, Diego bragging to Marcinho about running away with Patrícia, Marcinho asking her for explanations, Rosa coming to see Geraldo and Marta having discussions with Cibele. Things reach a melting point when a drunk Patrícia says everybody is there just to eat for free and nobody really liked Homero. Marta instills further chaos by offending Cibele and accusing Domingas of shooting Roberto, which prompts Geraldo to finally confess. He is then taken to jail as his father is buried. Manoel visits him, confesses his admiration for his courage and offers him a way out. Marcinho and Diego try to comfort Patrícia, but she asks both to leave her alone.
| 35 | 11 | "Episódio 11" | TBA | TBA | TBA |
In a flashback, a younger Manoel looks at a picture of his father, apologizes for nearly bringing the family's business to bankruptcy and accepts Homero's offer. Back in the present, he goes on a poaching errand and brings along Geraldo, who is initially critical of committing this crime. Meanwhile, Patrícia visits the business and insists that she and Cibele go search the place to see what Manoel is up to. When the pair returns, Patrícia asks Geraldo to leave with her, but he rather be there than imprisoned. Manoel sends Geraldo and Cibele to fulfill a deal, but once they arrive, the buyers complain that there are less animals than what had been agreed and both barely escape the ensuing shootout. Before leaving for the deal, Cibele is shown giving Marcinho a telephone full of pictures of Manoel's animals. Once back, Cibele, who deduces Manoel sent them both to die on the ill-faded deal, holds Manoel at gunpoint and makes it clear that she won't be working for him anymore and that she has evidence of his schemes. Geraldo, however, chooses to stay. Domingas keeps trying to reconnect with Diego and even offers him some money to help him. Marta locks Roberto inside his room following his refusal to reconcile with her, but Domingas comes to his aid. Marta later brings Lorraine to Roberto's house and she reveals that Cibele killed Sérgio, with which information Marta intends to convince Roberto to let go of Cibele. Lorraine meets Marcinho and tells him she's after his mother, who is later informed of this by Marcinho.
| 36 | 12 | "Episódio 12" | TBA | TBA | TBA |
Lorraine demands that Cibele turns herself in and dismisses Marcinho's pleads. After the truth is revealed, Roberto tells her to leave. Meanwhile, Raquel asks Lorraine's mother Joana (Kênia Bárbara) to care for Vitória should Lorraine fail to convince Cibele. Manoel and Geraldo go poaching and Domingas is alerted by the shots. She and Cibele go check what's happening and end up in a stand-off with the duo. Cibele is taken hostage and Domingas manages to escape and request help from Roberto, who picks up the house's rifle to go intervene. In the ensuing confusion, Geraldo shoots Manoel, whose body is later dragged away by an unseen animal. Geraldo tells Patrícia they can finally leave and she bids farewell to Diego, whom she tells should go back to his mother following her near-death experience, and Marcinho, to whom she leaves a letter of gratitude for their time together. Diego and Domingas reconcile. Marta is finally convinced that her marriage is over but the couple end it by recognizing the good times they had together. Roberto and Cibele reconcile, but despite this and Marcinho's protests, she decides to turn herself in so they can finally stop living on the run. Roberto takes her to a police station and she is seen taking Raquel's place in prison.

== Reception ==
=== Awards and nominations ===
| Year | Award | Category | Nomination | Outcome | Ref. |
|---|---|---|---|---|---|
| 2023 | Best of the Year | Best Series | Lucas Paraizo | Won | |
| 2023 | Best of the Year | Best Series Actress | Adriana Esteves | Won | |
| 2023 | Best of the Year | Best Series Actor | Eduardo Sterblitch | Won | |
| 2023 | Best of the Year | Best Series Actor | Milhem Cortaz | Nominated | |
| 2023 | Noticiasdetv.com Award | Best Series | Lucas Paraizo | Nominated | |
| 2023 | Noticiasdetv.com Award | Best Actress in a Leading Role | Adriana Esteves | Nominated | |
| 2023 | Noticiasdetv.com Award | Best Actor in a Leading Role | Milhem Cortaz | Nominated | |
| 2023 | Noticiasdetv.com Award | Best Actress in an Antagonist/Villain Role | Drica Moraes | Nominated | |
| 2023 | Noticiasdetv.com Award | Best Actors in an Antagonist/Villain Role | Eduardo Sterblitch | Nominated | |
| 2023 | Noticiasdetv.com Award | Best New Actor | Antônio Haddad | Nominated | |
| 2023 | Noticiasdetv.com Award | Best Guest Actor | Guilherme Fontes | Nominated | |
| 2023 | NaTelinha Best of the Year | Best Series or Documentary | Lucas Paraizo | Nominated | |
| 2023 | NaTelinha Best of the Year | Best Actress | Adriana Esteves | Nominated | |
| 2023 | NaTelinha Best of the Year | Best Actor | Milhem Cortaz | Nominated | |
| 2023 | NaTelinha Best of the Year | Best Actor | Eduardo Sterblitch | Nominated | |
| 2023 | Splash Awards | Best National Series (TV/Streaming) | Lucas Paraizo | Won | |
| 2023 | Splash Awards | Best Performance in a National Series | Adriana Esteves | Won | |
| 2023 | TVPedia Brasil Award | Series or Miniseries | Lucas Paraizo | Won | |
| 2023 | TVPedia Brasil Award | Series or Miniseries Actress | Adriana Esteves | Won | |
| 2023 | TVPedia Brasil Award | Series or Miniseries Actress | Drica Moraes | Nominated | |
| 2023 | TVPedia Brasil Award | Series or Miniseries Actor | Milhem Cortaz | Nominated | |
| 2023 | Duh Secco Best of the Year | Series | Lucas Paraizo | Won | |
| 2023 | Prêmio APCA de Televisão | Series - Fiction | Lucas Paraizo | Won | |
| 2023 | Prêmio APCA de Televisão | Best Actress | Adriana Esteves | Nominated | |
| 2023 | Prêmio APCA de Televisão | Best Actress | Maeve Jinkings | Nominated | |
| 2023 | Prêmio APCA de Televisão | Best Actor | Eduardo Sterblitch | Nominated | |
| 2023 | Prêmio APCA de Televisão | Best Actor | Milhem Cortaz | Won | |
| 2023 | Prêmio APCA de Televisão | Best Actor | Thomás Aquino | Nominated | |
