= Los Hermanos (song) =

Poetic folk song by Atahualpa Yupanqui

"Los Hermanos" (English: The Brothers) is a poetic folk song composed and first performed by Argentine nueva canción singer Atahualpa Yupanqui.

== Song information ==
"Los Hermanos" is often considered a protest song. Some claim it criticizes the dictatorship of the Latin American countries, done to secure the fidelity of the region to the United States and, by doing that, avoiding leftist governments. The lyrics are an ode to fraternity and freedom with an implicit urge for Latin American union:

"Yo tengo tantos hermanos
Que no los puedo contar
Y una novia muy hermosa...
Que se llama Libertad".

"I have so many brothers
That I can't even count them
And a beautiful bride...
That is called Liberty".

Though some take it as political, others contend that it has a broader universal appeal, with its verses about the common Argentine man, recognizing the others by the look in their eyes and realizing the difficulties they face in everyday life.

== Cover versions ==
There are more than 25 versions of this song.

Probably the best known cover version is that of Mercedes Sosa. She covered the song on her 1972 album Hasta la Victoria and again on her 1977 album Mercedes Sosa Interpreta a Atahualpa Yupanqui, her version changes the word "novia" (bride, fiancée) for "hermana" (sister), so she sings "...and (I have) a very beautiful sister whose name is Freedom".

The Brazilian MPB singer Elis Regina recorded "Los Hermanos" for her 1976 studio album Falso Brilhante. The singer was noted for being a critic of the Brazilian government (while being interviewed in Europe, she said that the country was being run by "gorillas").

Also Alfredo Zitarrosa on his 1973 album En La Argentina.

In 1983, Greek singer Dimitra Galani covered it on her LP Endless Road.
