= Carolina Markowicz =

Brazilian film director and screenwriter

- Born: São Paulo, Brazil
- Occupations: Film director, screenwriter
- Notable work: The Orphan (short film), Charcoal, Toll
- Awards: Queer Palm (2018) Emerging Talent Award (2023) International Emmy Award for Best Comedy (2020, for Nobody's Looking)

Carolina Markowicz is a Brazilian film director and screenwriter. She has written and directed two feature films and six short films, which have screened at over 400 film festivals, including Cannes, Locarno, Toronto, SXSW, and San Sebastián, and have received more than 100 awards.

== Career ==
Based in São Paulo, she directed a number of short films in her early career, most notably winning the Queer Palm at the 2018 Cannes Film Festival for The Orphan (O Órfão). The film premiered in the Directors’ Fortnight at Cannes and was also selected for the 2018 Toronto International Film Festival. It was the first Brazilian film to receive the Queer Palm.

Her 2014 short Tatuapé Mahal Tower premiered at the 2014 Toronto International Film Festival, where she was named one of "five filmmakers to watch" by programmer Shane Smith. After its online release, the film was selected among the Vimeo Staff Picks’ Best of the Year in 2017.

She has participated in several international development labs, including TIFF Talent Lab, Berlinale Talents, and the Locarno Filmmakers Academy. Indiewire highlighted the latter program as showcasing "some of the world's most exciting new filmmakers."

In 2019, as part of the SEE Factory initiative, Markowicz co-wrote and co-directed the short film Spit, which premiered during the opening of that year’s Directors’ Fortnight at Cannes.

She was subsequently a co-creator of the television series Nobody's Looking (Ninguém Tá Olhando), which won the International Emmy Award for Best Comedy in 2020.

== Feature films ==
Her debut feature film Charcoal (Carvão) premiered in 2022 in the Platform Prize program at the 2022 Toronto International Film Festival, and had its European premiere at the 71st San Sebastián International Film Festival. The film has since won more than ten awards internationally.

Her second film, Toll (Pedágio), was screened in the Centrepiece program at the 2023 Toronto International Film Festival, where Markowicz was named as the recipient of the Emerging Talent Award at the TIFF Tribute Awards. The film has been selected to over 80 international festivals and has received 28 awards to date, including Best Film at the Rome International Film Festival under a jury chaired by Gael García Bernal, as well as awards at the Leeds International Film Festival and the Oostende Film Festival.

== Recognition ==
In 2021, Markowicz was invited to become a member of the Academy of Motion Picture Arts and Sciences (AMPAS).

In February 2025, Mubi Brazil launched a retrospective of her work, showcasing both short and feature-length films curated in collaboration with the director.

== Filmography ==
- 69 Luz Square (69 Praça de Luz) — 2007
- Tatuapé Mahal Tower (Edifício Tatuapé Mahal) — 2014
- Postponed (Postegrados) — 2016
- Long Distance Relationship — 2017
- Spit — 2019
- The Orphan (O Órfão) — 2018
- Nobody's Looking (Ninguém Tá Olhando) — 2019
- Charcoal (Carvão) — 2022
- Toll (Pedágio) — 2023
