= The Orphan (2018 film) =

- Portuguese: O Órfão
- Directed by: Carolina Markowicz
- Written by: Carolina Markowicz
- Produced by: Mario Peixoto; Mayra Faour Awad
- Starring: Kauan Alavrenga
- Cinematography: Pepe Mendes
- Edited by: Lautaro Colace
- Production company: MyMama Entertainment
- Release date: 17 May 2018 (Cannes)
- Running time: 16 minutes
- Country: Brazil
- Language: Portuguese

The Orphan (Portuguese: O Órfão) is a 2018 Brazilian short drama film, written and directed by Carolina Markowicz. The film stars Kauan Alavrenga as Jonathas, a young orphan who was adopted by a family, but then was abandoned and returned to the orphanage when they discovered that he was gay.

The film premiered at the 2018 Cannes Film Festival, where it was the winner of the Queer Palm for best LGBTQ-themed short film.
