= Sleep With Your Eyes Open =

2024 film by Nele Wohlatz

- Portuguese: Dormir de Olhos Abertos
- Directed by: Nele Wohlatz
- Written by: Pío Longo; Nele Wohlatz
- Produced by: Justine O.; Violeta Bava; Rosa Martínez Rivero; Emilie Lesclaux; Kleber Mendonça Filho
- Starring: Chen Xiao Xin; Wang Shin-hong; Liao Kai Ro; Nahuel Pérez Biscayart; Lu Yang Zong
- Cinematography: Roman Kasseroller
- Edited by: Tsai Yann-shan; Ana Godoy
- Music by: Gustavo Montenegro
- Production companies: Ruda Cine; Blinker Filmproduktion; Yi Tiao Long Hu Bao; CinemaScópio
- Distributed by: Vitrine Filmes (Brazil)
- Release dates: 17 February 2024 (Berlinale); 11 September 2025 (Brazil)
- Running time: 97 minutes
- Countries: Brazil; Argentina; Germany; Taiwan
- Languages: Mandarin; Portuguese; English; Spanish

Sleep With Your Eyes Open (Portuguese: Dormir de Olhos Abertos) is a 2024 drama film directed by Nele Wohlatz, co-written with Pío Longo. A co-production of Brazil, Argentina, Germany, and Taiwan, it follows Xiao Xin (Chen Xiao Xin) search for belonging alongside the Taiwanese diaspora in Recife, Brazil.

The film had its world premiere in the Encounters section of the 74th Berlin International Film Festival on 17 February 2024, where it won the FIPRESCI prize. It was theatrically released in Brazil by Vitrine Filmes on 11 September 2025.

== Cast ==
- Chen Xiao Xin as Xiao Xin
- Wang Shin-hong as Fu Ang
- Liao Kai Ro as Kai
- Nahuel Pérez Biscayart as Leo
- Lu Yang Zong as Yang Zong

== Production ==
Brazilian filmmaker Kleber Mendonça Filho and French producer Emilie Lesclaux produced the film through their CinemaScópio producing company. In 2016, Mendonça had introduced to Wohlatz the Taiwanese (and Chinese) diaspora living in Recife, the German filmmaker also directed a docudrama about the Chinese diaspora in Argentina, The Future Perfect (2016).

=== Filming ===
Principal photography took place in Recife, Pernambuco, Brazil.
