= Kleber Mendonça Filho =

Brazilian film director, screenwriter, producer, and critic (born 1968)

- Mendonça Filho in 2025
- Born: 22 November 1968 (age 57); Recife, Pernambuco, Brazil
- Occupations: Filmmaker, producer, critic
- Years active: 1997–present
- Spouse: Emilie Lesclaux
- Children: 2

Kleber de Mendonça Vasconcellos Filho (/mɛnˈdoʊnsə fiːljuː/ men-DOHN-sə FEEL-yoo; Portuguese: [ˈklɛbeʁ mẽˈdõsɐ ˈfiʎu]; born 22 November 1968) is a Brazilian film director, screenwriter and producer. Beginning his career as a movie critic, he transitioned to filmmaking in 2002, initially directing short films and documentaries. In 2012, his narrative feature debut Neighboring Sounds (2012) was included by The New York Times in its best-of-the-year list.

His following films, Aquarius (2016) and Bacurau (2019), were nominated for the Palme d'Or at the Cannes Film Festival, while the latter won the Jury Prize in Cannes. For The Secret Agent (2025), Mendonça Filho won Best Director at the 78th Cannes Film Festival, and Best Non-English Language Film at the 83rd Golden Globes Awards, while the film was also nominated for Best Picture and Best International Film at the 98th Academy Awards.

== Early life ==
With a degree in journalism from the Federal University of Pernambuco, Kleber Mendonça Filho began his career as a film critic and journalist. He wrote for newspapers such as Jornal do Commercio and Folha de S. Paulo, for magazines such as Continente and Cinética, and for his own site, CinemaScópio.

Mendonça's films have received more than 120 awards in Brazil and abroad, with selections in festivals such as New York, Copenhagen and Cannes (Quinzaine des réalisateurs). Film festivals in Rotterdam, Toulouse, and Santa Maria da Feira have presented retrospectives of his films. He has served as programmer of cinema for the Joaquim Nabuco Foundation.

== Career ==
Having initiated his career as a movie critic, Mendonça transitioned to filmmaking in 2002, initially directing short films and documentaries. He migrated from video to digital and 35mm film in the 2000s. Over the course of that decade, he made several short films, including A Menina do Algodão (co-directed by Daniel Bandeira, 2002), Vinil Verde (2004), Eletrodoméstica (2005), Noite de Sexta Manhã de Sábado (2006), and Recife Frio (Cold Tropics, 2009), as well as a feature-length documentary, Crítico (2008).

Neighbouring Sounds (O Som ao Redor, 2012) was Mendonça's first feature-length drama, winning numerous awards. Film critic AO Scott of The New York Times included it in his list of the 10 best films of 2012. Caetano Veloso, in his column in the Brazilian newspaper O Globo, classified it as "one of the best movies made recently in the world ". The film was selected as the Brazilian submission for the 86th Academy Awards for Best Foreign Language Film, but was not nominated.

His second feature film, Aquarius (2016), had its world premiere at the main competition of the 69th Cannes Film Festival. In 2017, he was the jury president of the Critics' Week section of the 2017 Cannes Film Festival.

Bacurau (2019), co-written and co-directed with Juliano Dornelles, won the Jury Prize at the 72nd Cannes Film Festival, alongside Ladj Ly's Les Misérables. In 2020, he was a member of the main competition jury of the 70th Berlin International Film Festival. The following year, he was a member of the main competition jury of the 2021 Cannes Film Festival.

His second documentary feature, Pictures of Ghosts (Retratos Fantasmas) had its world premiere at the Special Screenings section of the 2023 Cannes Film Festival. The film was selected as the Brazilian submission for the 96th Academy Awards, but was not nominated. In 2024, he was a member of the main competition jury of the 81st Venice International Film Festival.

The Secret Agent (O Agente Secreto), his fourth feature film, had its world premiered at the main competition of the 2025 Cannes Film Festival, where Mendonça was awarded the Best Director prize, alongside the Best Actor prize for Wagner Moura. It was nominated for Best International Film as the Brazilian submission at the 98th Academy Awards, alongside other three nominations including Best Picture.

During the 63rd New York Film Festival, Mendonça directed the short documentary South of Tehran, starring the Iranian filmmaker Jafar Panahi. The production was a part of the "NYFF Encounters" program, a new annual commissioning program that invites one filmmaker with a film selected for the festival to create an original short during the course of the festival. It was shot in 16mm by French cinematographer Evgenia Alexandrova, and produced by Emilie Lesclaux. The short was selected for the Spotlight Gala section of the 2026 New York Film Festival.

Lesclaux and Mendonça at the 2025 Toronto International Film Festival

== Personal life ==
Mendonça is married to French producer Emilie Lesclaux. Together they created the Brazilian production company CinemaScópio.

=== Political beliefs ===
During the world premiere of Aquarius at the 2016 Cannes Film Festival, Mendonça and the film's cast showed protest signs written in Portuguese, English and French criticizing the Impeachment of Dilma Rousseff. The signs included messages such as "Brazil is not a democracy anymore", "Sauvez la démocratie brésilienne" ("Save Brazilian democracy"), and "Dilma, vamos resistir com você" ("Dilma, we will resist with you"). Dilma was later removed from power. Her successor, right-wing politician Michel Temer, through his Ministry of Culture Oscar submission committee, boycotted Aquarius during the selection process for the Best Foreign Language Film at the 89th Academy Awards, which was seen as an act of retaliation following the Cannes protest.

During the far-right Jair Bolsonaro government (2019–2022), Bacurau was also not selected as the Brazilian official submission for the 92nd Academy Awards, creating further controversy around a supposed political boycott of Mendonça's films.

In 2021, he announced his membership in the Workers' Party, the centre-left party led by Lula.

In 2025, Mendonça and more than 350 directors, actors and producers, signed a letter denouncing the ongoing genocide in Gaza, stating: "We cannot remain silent while genocide is taking place in Gaza".

== Filmography ==
=== Feature films ===
| Year | English title | Original title | Notes |
|---|---|---|---|
| 2012 | Neighboring Sounds | O Som ao Redor | Also editor |
| 2016 | Aquarius | | |
| 2019 | Bacurau | | Co-directed with Juliano Dornelles |
| 2025 | The Secret Agent | O Agente Secreto | |

=== Producing credits ===
- Heartless (2023)
- Sleep With Your Eyes Open (2024)
- Seu Cavalcanti (2024)
- Leïla et la nuit (TBA)

=== Documentaries ===
| Year | English title | Original title |
|---|---|---|
| 2008 | Crítico | |
| 2019 | Bacurau on the Map | Bacurau no Mapa |
| 2023 | Pictures of Ghosts | Retratos Fantasmas |

=== Short films ===
| Year | English title | Original title | Notes |
|---|---|---|---|
| 1992 | Homem de Projeção | | Short documentary. Co-directed with Elissama Cantalice. |
| 1992 | Casa de Imagem | | Short documentary. Co-directed with Elissama Cantalice. |
| 1995 | Lixo nos Canais | | Short documentary. Co-directed with José Afonso Jr. |
| 1997 | Caged In | Enjaulado | |
| 2002 | The Little Cotton Girl | A Menina do Algodão | Co-directed with Daniel Bandeira |
| 2004 | Green Vinyl | Vinil Verde | |
| 2005 | Eletrodoméstica | | |
| 2007 | Friday Night, Saturday Morning | Noite de Sexta, Manhã de Sábado | |
| 2009 | Cold Tropics | Recife Frio | |
| 2015 | The World Cup in Recife | A Copa do Mundo no Recife | Short documentary |
| 2026 | South of Tehran | Sul de Tehran | Short documentary |

== Accolades ==
For Aquarius (2016), Mendonça Filho was nominated for Best International Film at the 32nd Independent Spirit Awards and for the César Award for Best Foreign Film.

For Bacurau (2019), he was nominated for the Palme d'Or at the Cannes Film Festival, winning the Jury Prize in Cannes and the NYFCC Award for Best Foreign Language Film.

For The Secret Agent (2025), Mendonça Filho won the Best Director award and the FIPRESCI Prize for Best Film at Cannes, the NYFCC Award for Best Foreign Language Film, as well as the award for Best Foreign Language Film at the 51st Los Angeles Film Critics Association Awards, where he also was the runner-up for Best Picture. At the 83rd Golden Globes Awards, the film was the first Brazilian production to be nominated for Best Motion Picture and won Best Foreign Language Film. At the 79th British Academy Film Awards, the film received nominations for Best Original Screenplay and Best Film Not in the English Language. At the 98th Academy Awards, it was nominated for Best Picture marking the second year in a row that a Brazilian feature film was nominated in the category following I'm Still Here (2024), it was also nominated for Best International Film representing Brazil.

| Organizations | Year | Category | Work | Result | Ref. |
|---|---|---|---|---|---|
| British Academy Film Awards | 2026 | Best Original Screenplay | The Secret Agent | Nominated | |
| Cannes Film Festival | 2016 | Palme d'Or | Aquarius | Nominated | |
| Cannes Film Festival | 2019 | Palme d'Or | Bacurau | Nominated | |
| Cannes Film Festival | 2019 | Jury Prize | Bacurau | Won | |
| Cannes Film Festival | 2023 | L'Œil d'or | Pictures of Ghosts | Nominated | |
| Cannes Film Festival | 2025 | Palme d'Or | The Secret Agent | Nominated | |
| Cannes Film Festival | 2025 | Best Director | The Secret Agent | Won | |
| Cannes Film Festival | 2025 | FIPRESCI Prize | The Secret Agent | Won | |
| Cannes Film Festival | 2025 | Art House Cinema Award | The Secret Agent | Won | |
| Brazilian Academy Film Awards | 2011 | Best Short Film | Cold Tropics | Won | |
| Brazilian Academy Film Awards | 2014 | Best Film | Neighboring Sounds | Won | |
| Brazilian Academy Film Awards | 2014 | Best Director | Neighboring Sounds | Nominated | |
| Brazilian Academy Film Awards | 2014 | Best Original Screenplay | Neighboring Sounds | Won | |
| Brazilian Academy Film Awards | 2014 | Best Editing | Neighboring Sounds | Nominated | |
| Brazilian Academy Film Awards | 2017 | Best Film | Aquarius | Won | |
| Brazilian Academy Film Awards | 2017 | Best Director | Aquarius | Won | |
| Brazilian Academy Film Awards | 2017 | Best Original Screenplay | Aquarius | Nominated | |
| Brazilian Academy Film Awards | 2020 | Best Film | Bacurau | Won | |
| Brazilian Academy Film Awards | 2020 | Best Director | Bacurau | Won | |
| Brazilian Academy Film Awards | 2020 | Best Original Screenplay | Bacurau | Won | |
| Brazilian Academy Film Awards | 2024 | Best Documentary | Pictures of Ghosts | Nominated | |
| Brazilian Academy Film Awards | 2024 | Best Director | Pictures of Ghosts | Nominated | |
| Chicago International Film Festival | 2025 | Golden Hugo for Best Film | The Secret Agent | Nominated | |
| Critics Choice Awards Celebration of Cinema & Television | 2025 | Director Award | The Secret Agent | Won | |
| César Awards | 2017 | Best Foreign Film | Aquarius | Nominated | |
| Film Independent Spirit Awards | 2017 | Best International Film | Aquarius | Nominated | |
| Film Independent Spirit Awards | 2020 | Best International Film | Bacurau | Nominated | |
| Film Independent Spirit Awards | 2025 | Best International Film | The Secret Agent | Won | |
| Golden Globe Awards | 2026 | Best Foreign Language Film | The Secret Agent | Won | |
| Gotham Awards | 2020 | Best International Feature | Bacurau | Nominated | |
| Gotham Awards | 2020 | Audience Award | Bacurau | Nominated | |
| Gotham Awards | 2025 | Best Original Screenplay | The Secret Agent | Nominated | |
| Gramado Film Festival | 2012 | Golden Kikito | Neighboring Sounds | Nominated | |
| Gramado Film Festival | 2012 | Best Director | Neighboring Sounds | Won | |
| Gramado Film Festival | 2012 | Best Sound | Neighboring Sounds | Won | |
| Gramado Film Festival | 2012 | Critics Prize | Neighboring Sounds | Won | |
| Gramado Film Festival | 2012 | Audience Award | Neighboring Sounds | Won | |
| International Federation of Film Critics | 2025 | Grand Prix for Best Film of the Year | The Secret Agent | Nominated | |
| Lima Film Festival | 2016 | Jury Award | Aquarius | Won | |
| Lima Film Festival | 2019 | Trophy Spondylus | Bacurau | Won | |
| Lima Film Festival | 2019 | Best Director | Bacurau | Won | |
| Lima Film Festival | 2023 | Trophy Spondylus (Documentary) | Pictures of Ghosts | Won | |
| Lima Film Festival | 2025 | Trophy Spondylus | The Secret Agent | Won | |
| New York Film Critics Circle | 2020 | Best Foreign Language Film | Bacurau | Won | |
| New York Film Critics Circle | 2025 | Best Foreign Language Film | The Secret Agent | Won | |
| Rotterdam International Film Festival | 2012 | Tiger Award | Neighboring Sounds | Nominated | |
| Rotterdam International Film Festival | 2012 | FIPRESCI Prize | Neighboring Sounds | Nominated | |
| Sitges Film Festival | 2019 | Fantàstic Competition Best Film | Bacurau | Nominated | |
| Sitges Film Festival | 2019 | Fantàstic Competition Best Director | Bacurau | Won | |
| Sitges Film Festival | 2019 | Critics Award Best Film | Bacurau | Won | |
| Sitges Film Festival | 2019 | Carnet Jove Jury Award | Bacurau | Won | |
| Toronto Film Critics Association | 2020 | Best Foreign Language Film | Bacurau | Won | |
