= Charcoal (film) =

- Promotional release poster
- Portuguese: Carvão
- Directed by: Carolina Markowicz
- Written by: Carolina Markowicz
- Produced by: Zita Carvalhosa
- Starring: César Bordón; Rômulo Braga; Jean de Almeida Costa; Maeve Jinkings; Camila Márdila
- Cinematography: Pepe Mendes
- Edited by: Lautaro Colace
- Music by: Alejandro Kauderer
- Production companies: Superfilms; Biônica Filmes; Ajimolido Films
- Release date: September 11, 2022 (TIFF)
- Running time: 107 minutes
- Countries: Argentina; Brazil
- Languages: Portuguese; Spanish

Charcoal (Portuguese: Carvão) is a 2022 Argentine-Brazilian black comedy-drama film written and directed by Carolina Markowicz.

== Plot ==
In the São Paulo countryside, a rural peasant family struggle to care for their ailing patriarch; one day, however, an Argentine drug lord arrives with an offer to give them a substantial amount of money conditional on permitting him to kill the old man and take his place as part of his efforts to hide out from criminal prosecution.

== Cast ==
- César Bordón as Miguel
- Rômulo Braga
- Jean de Almeida Costa as Jean
- Maeve Jinkings as Irene
- Camila Márdila as Luciana
- Aline Marta Maia
- Pedro Wagner

== Release ==
The film premiered in the Platform Prize program at the 2022 Toronto International Film Festival on September 11, 2022. It also screened as part of the Latin Horizons program at the 70th San Sebastián International Film Festival.

== Reception ==
Charcoal has an approval rating of 100% on review aggregator website Rotten Tomatoes, based on 17 reviews, and an average rating of 7.6/10.
