= Tatuagem =

Poem by Chico Buarque de Holanda and Ruy Guerra for the play Calabar

- by Chico Buarque de Holanda and Ruy Guerra
- Country: Brazil
- Language: Portuguese
- Subject: Love
- Publication date: c. 1972-1973

"Tatuagem" (English: Tattoo) is a poem written by the Brazilian singer, composer, dramatist and writer Chico Buarque de Holanda and the Brazilian film director, screenwriter, film editor, and actor Ruy Guerra, for the stage play Calabar (1972–1973). The poem was adapted into a song by Buarque, who recorded it on his album Chico Canta (1973). It was later recorded by the Brazilian singer Elis Regina for her studio album Falso Brilhante (1976).

The poem is written from the point of view of a woman, who is described as being deeply in love with a man. She describes how she wants to stay in the body of her lover as if she were his tattoo.
