= Neighboring Sounds =

2012 film directed by Kleber Mendonça Filho

- Theatrical release poster
- Directed by: Kleber Mendonça Filho
- Written by: Kleber Mendonça Filho
- Produced by: Emilie Lesclaux
- Starring: Irandhir Santos; Gustavo Jahn; Maeve Jinkings
- Cinematography: Pedro Sotero; Fabricio Tadeu
- Edited by: Kleber Mendonça Filho; João Maria
- Music by: DJ Dolores
- Production company: CinemaScópio
- Distributed by: Vitrine Filmes
- Release dates: February 1, 2012 (IFFR); January 4, 2013 (Brazil)
- Running time: 131 minutes
- Country: Brazil
- Language: Portuguese
- Budget: R$1,860,000
- Box office: R$968,981

Neighboring Sounds (Portuguese: O Som ao Redor) is a 2012 Brazilian drama film directed and written by Kleber Mendonça Filho, starring Irandhir Santos, Gustavo Jahn and Maeve Jinkings.

The film was screened at the International Film Festival Rotterdam and was released nationally on January 4, 2013. It was selected as the Brazilian submission for best foreign language film at the 86th Academy Awards, but was not nominated. New York Times film critic A. O. Scott named it one of the top films of 2012.

== Plot ==
=== Prologue ===
The film opens with several black and white photos of the sugar plantations that built Recife - of a countryside, a family, a man talking to an old woman, a woman in cultural clothing, a group of villagers, a hill and pasture, an estate, from two angles, farmers working, and a group of women holding up pieces of paper.

In the present day city, a young boy bicycles while a young girl rollerblades through a parking lot to a public area where many children are playing. Some of the children watch a worker grinding the metal security bars covering a window. Cars and motorcycles drive over large personal messages written on the asphalt of the street. Apartment buildings tower over power lines. The camera zooms in from above on a young man and woman kissing in the corner of a yard. Two cars collide at an intersection.

=== Part 1: Guard Dogs ===
Beatriz Linhares is a middle-aged married housewife with two young children, Fernanda and Nelsinho, living in a middle-class neighborhood in Recife, Brazil. One night, unable to sleep due to a dog’s barking, she drugs it; by morning, it is lying on the ground, unable to bark or stand up. Nearby lives João, a young man who works as a real estate agent for his sugar magnate grandfather; the night before, he had just met and slept with a young woman named Sofia, who used to live on their street. As they exit his apartment, they discover that Sofia’s car has been broken into and the stereo stolen. João suspects that the culprit is Dinho, his troublemaking cousin.

João visits Dinho‘s father Anco, who lives down the street and also works as a real estate agent for the family. Anco asks to be left out of any business with Dinho. The two are then approached by Clodoaldo, a man representing an independent private security firm looking to do business with families in the neighborhood. Anco and João are indifferent, but do not outright refuse their services, directing them to their magnate relative Francisco. João visits Dinho, who is infuriated by João’s insinuation that he is the thief, but as João is leaving, Dinho‘s housekeeper runs out to deliver a car stereo in a plastic bag. While Beatriz's children are at English class, a man arrives to deliver water and pot to her. After he leaves, she masturbates with the vibrations of the washing machine.

Clodoaldo and his coworker, the one-eyed Fernando, pay a visit to Francisco, João and Dinho’s grandfather, Anco’s father, and the owner of half of the property in the area, to receive his blessing to start work in the neighborhood. Francisco blesses them, tells them that he only lives in the area, and requests that they do not do business with Dinho, who has been upsetting Anco. After the men leave, Francisco calls João, who tells him that he is worried about Dinho.

=== Part 2: Night Guards ===
Beatriz and her family express suspicion over the security men, who came to offer their services the day after two car stereos just so happen to be stolen.

At a condominium meeting, a group of residents argue that their night watchman is becoming negligent in his duties and should be fired without severance pay; João is the sole dissenter who believes that in light of his years of service, the man should receive severance pay. João leaves after getting a phone call while the others express annoyance at his exceedingly rare yet opinionated attendance at the condo meetings despite never being there for an actual vote. João meets Sofia and the two go to his room; unbeknownst to them, as they make out in the elevator, they are being watched by the night watchman through the surveillance camera. After sex, João hands Sofia the car stereo, but she claims that it is nicer than hers. João tells her that they can visit the house that she briefly lived in 20 years ago; upon learning that Francisco used to own the entire area, Sofia reasons that João is rich and laughingly suggests marriage.

Beatriz is once again disturbed by dog barks at night. In her underwear, she climbs the spiral staircase by her front door and smokes pot on the roof, having no reaction to the sight of a person crawling on top of another nearby roof. Meanwhile, Francisco walks the deserted late night streets, heading to the nearby beach to swim alone, crossing himself as he dives into the waves. A large sign at the beach entrance warning of sharks. As he returns safely, Clodoaldo calls Dinho from a pay phone, threatening to kill him if he burgles another car. Dinho soon arrives and threatens to retaliate if he discovers that it was the security men who called him. At high speed, a car loudly makes a U-turn on an adjacent street.

=== Part 3: Bodyguards ===
João and Sofia go to see Francisco at his old sugar plantation that he is always cajoling the family to visit. Over lunch, they discuss marriage; Sofia admits to not being sure yet. Afterwards, the trio sleep in hammocks as dreams blend with reality: João and Sofia explore the surrounding area, including an impoverished school dedicated to John Carpenter as well as an overgrown abandoned cinema. As the three soak under a waterfall, the water falling on João turns blood red.

Some time has passed. In Recife, the security men have integrated into the neighborhood. In the middle of the day, they help a drunk Argentine find his way back to the party he had been attending. Clodoaldo tells his men that he will have to leave for some time to run errands for his brother Claudio, who has just arrived in the area. Fernanda, Nelsinho and their Chinese tutor are distracted by Beatriz's continued war with the barking dog, which has now escalated to playing loud high pitched tones from the window. Luciene, a house worker in Francisco’s house, leaves to take his clothes to the dry cleaners; along the way, she meets her boyfriend - Clodoaldo. A resident is out of town and gave Clodoaldo the keys, so they go into his house to have sex, despite constant telephone ringing. The Menino-aranha/enslaved boy suddenly walks by the bedroom, but he does not seem to take notice of the couple, nor them of him.

Late one night, while struggling to stay awake, Fernando becomes wary of a car suspiciously braking periodically as it travels down the street. On edge due to previously having been told a story of a security guard murdered after being caught unawares by a similarly suspicious car, Fernando rises brandishing his truncheon, but all that emerges from the car is a well dressed couple who have pulled over to vomit. Fernanda has a nightmare about waves of people hopping the fence in the night, until the gated entrances and gardens of the neighborhood resemble a densely populated favela. As Fernando lackadaisically patrols on bicycle, he comes across the ghost like Menino-aranha/slave boy in a tree. After him and another security guard accost the boy and punch him in the face, the boy flees running barefoot down the deserted night streets.

João and Sofia visit the house she used to live in; as she revisits the rooms, she appears lost among her memories. Anco has a similar moment while gazing down the street and remembering how it looked prior to redevelopment. Francisco calls Clodoaldo’s security firm, but nobody picks up. Beatriz leaves to buy firecrackers to torment the dog after chewing out her housekeeper for frying the tone generator by plugging it into the wrong outlet.

Anco hosts a party for his niece’s 13th birthday. There, João reveals to Dinho that he and Sofia have broken up, and muses on the charm of having large families. After the party, Francisco finds Clodoaldo and tells him to go to his apartment. He arrives with Claudio, to Francisco’s disapproval, but he allows him to stay. Francisco tells them that Reginaldo, his foreman for many years, has been murdered, so he wants them to provide him with some extra security; however, when Clodoaldo and Claudio ask Francisco whether he believes he has any connection to the killing, Francisco refuses to answer. Claudio then tells Francisco that they’d been to see Reginaldo and reveals to him that they are the sons of Antonio and nephews of Everett; while the film never specifies, it is implied that near the end of the dictatorship, Francisco had them murdered over a fence dispute. Upon this revelation, all three men stand up.

=== Epilogue ===
Beatriz returns with the firecrackers; upon them being lit, the entire family scrambles to watch them from a distance. The loud noises puncture the quiet of the night and frighten the dog. The film ends with a freeze frame - of Beatriz, her husband, and Fernanda gathered together, looking in fear at the fireworks while some paces away, a cowering Nelsinho looks away, his hands over his ears.

== Cast ==
- Irandhir Santos as Clodoaldo
- Gustavo Jahn as João
- Maeve Jinkings as Bia
- W.J. Solha as Francisco
- Irma Brown as Sofia
- Lula Terra as Anco
- Yuri Holanda as Dinho
- Clébia Souza as Luciene
- Albert Tenório as Ronaldo
- Nivaldo Nascimento as Fernando
- Felipe Bandeira as Nelson
- Clara Pinheiro de Oliveira as Fernanda
- Sebastião Formiga as Claudio
- Mauricéia Conceição as Mariá

== Production ==
Neighboring Sounds is the first fiction feature film from director Kleber Mendonça Filho, who had previously directed the documentary Critical. Recife and Zona da Mata in Pernambuco serve as a backdrop for the dialogue of the actors, being recorded in July and August 2010 for 6 weeks and 3 days. The period of editing the film took two years to complete, and also a long time to hit Brazilian theaters, just released nationally on January 4, 2013, with distribution by Vitrine Filmes. Written in 2008, the screenplay was awarded by the Hubert Bals Fund, from Rotterdam Film Festival, where the film made its world premiere. The screenplay was also awarded in bidding by Petrobras and the Government of Pernambuco.

== Reception ==
=== Critical response ===
One of the most acclaimed Brazilian films in 2012, Neighbouring Sounds received overwhelmingly positive reviews. Neighboring Sounds has an approval rating of 93% on review aggregator website Rotten Tomatoes, based on 42 reviews, and an average rating of 7.8/10. The website's critical consensus states: "An outstanding feature debut for director Kleber Mendonça Filho, Neighbouring Sounds takes a delightfully dark -- and wholly absorbing -- look at human nature". Metacritic assigned the film a weighted average score of 77 out of 100, based on 9 critics, indicating "generally favorable reviews".

Critic A. O. Scott from The New York Times names as one of the world's top 10 movies made in 2012. Caetano Veloso, in his column in the newspaper O Globo, called it "one of the best films made recently in the world." Robert Abele from Los Angeles Times emphasizes it as "remarkable" and "breathtaking". Tom Dawson of Total Film gave it four of five stars, saying that Filho "reveals a society haunted by both its past and by the threat of future violence", while David Parkinson from Empire also praises the director, calling his film "a hugely impressive debut feature".

President of Brazil Dilma Rousseff, in her Twitter account, said to be happy with the film's submission to the 86th Academy Awards, stating it's a "beautiful film". The president also recommended Neighbouring Sounds to her followers, considering the film "a chronicle of today's Recife".

=== Accolades ===
Awards Group	Category	Recipient	Result
2012 BFI London Film Festival Awards	Sutherland Award		Nominated
2012 CPH:PIX	New Talent Grand Pix	Kleber Mendonça Filho	Won
2012 Festival de Gramado	Brazilian Competition		Won
2012 Festival de Gramado	Best Director	Kleber Mendonça Filho	Won
2012 Festival de Gramado	Best Sound	Kleber Mendonça Filho & Pablo Lamar	Won
2012 Mar del Plata Film Festival	Best Film		Nominated
2012 Films from the South	FIPRESCI Prize		Won
2012 Festival do Rio	Best Film		Won
2012 Festival do Rio	Best Screenplay	Kleber Mendonça Filho	Won
2012 International Film Festival Rotterdam	Tiger Competition		Won
2012 International Film Festival Rotterdam	Tiger Award		Nominated
2012 Sydney Film Festival	Official Competition Award		Nominated
2012 São Paulo International Film Festival	Best Brazilian Film		Won
2013 Lleida Latin-American Film Festival	Special Jury Award		Won
2013 Lleida Latin-American Film Festival	Best Screenplay	Kleber Mendonça Filho	Won
AFM International Independent Film Festival	!f Inspired Award		Won

== See also ==
- List of submissions to the 86th Academy Awards for Best Foreign Language Film
- List of Brazilian submissions for the Academy Award for Best Foreign Language Film
