= Raimundo Carrero =

Brazilian journalist and writer (1947–2026)

Raimundo Carrero de Barros Filho (20 December 1947 – 16 June 2026) was a Brazilian journalist and writer.

== Life and career ==
Carrero was born in the city of Salgueiro, Pernambuco on 20 December 1947. His first contact with literature was still in his teens, when his brother became a circus artist and left him a box of books. He graduated from the Federal University of Pernambuco (UFPE). A career journalist, he spent more than 25 years at the Diário de Pernambuco. In 1976, Carrero published a fictional text that popularized the urban legend "The Hairy Leg".

As a writer, he achieved prominence from the 1970s onwards, when he participated in the Armorial Movement, led by writer Ariano Suassuna and focused on the culture of the Northeast of Brazil. He won numerous prizes, among them the São Paulo Prize for Literature in 2010 for his novel A minha alma é irmã de Deus.

He taught at UFPE between 1971 and 1996, and founded the Literary Creation Workshop in Recife, among whose graduates was the writer Marcelino Freire.

Carrero died from cancer in Recife, on 16 June 2026, at the age of 78.
