= Tânia Maria =

Brazilian actress (born 1947)

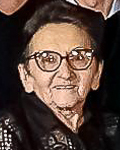
- Born: Sebastiana Maria de Medeiros Filha; January 19, 1947 (age 79); Parelhas, Rio Grande do Norte, Brazil
- Occupations: Actor; Craftswoman; Seamstress
- Years active: 2019–present
- Known for: Bacurau (2019); The Secret Agent (2025)

Sebastiana Maria de Medeiros Filha (born January 19, 1947), better known as Tânia Maria, is a Brazilian actress, artisan, and seamstress. She gained notability after appearing in the films Bacurau and The Secret Agent, both by filmmaker Kleber Mendonça Filho.

== Biography ==
Tânia was born on January 19, 1947, in the village of Santo Antônio da Cobra, located in the rural area of the city of Parelhas, in the interior of the state of Rio Grande do Norte. Tânia Maria devoted much of her life to crafts and sewing, making bathroom rugs from recycled materials and working as a seamstress.

Before her film career, Tânia Maria had never watched an entire movie or gone to the movies, and her contact with television was also minimal. It was only at the age of 72 that her artistic life began, when she appeared as an extra in Kleber Mendonça Filho's film Bacurau. In an interview with journalist Rute Pina from BBC News Brasil, she stated that her acting career began by chance: “I was sewing and heard some conversations in the dining room. When I arrived and said ‘good evening,’ she said, ‘she's just what I need,’ and asked me if I would be willing to be an extra. Earning R$ 50 every day, I thought it was too good to be true." (Note: In 2019, the year the film was shot, the dollar closed at four reais in Brazil. In other words, the actress earned the equivalent of twelve dollars per day as an extra.)

She worked with Mendonça Filho again in 2025, in the film The Secret Agent, where she plays the character Dona Sebastiana, manager of the Ofir Building, who helps Wagner Moura's character take refuge while he is being persecuted by the Brazilian military dictatorship. For her performance in the film, she was awarded by The New York Times magazine in the category "Best Performance with a Cigarette," created exclusively to highlight Tânia's performance. For her performance in the latter, the actress was included in The Hollywood Reporter magazine predictions as one of the possible nominees for the 2026 Academy Award for Best Supporting Actress, as well as being praised by Variety.

She also participated in the fictional documentary Seu Cavalcanti and, the feature film Yellow Cake and the short film O Dilema das Rosas. Also starred in the series Delegado, which premieres in 2026 on Canal Brasil and features Johnny Massaro and Virgínia Cavendish in the cast.

== Personal life ==
At the age of 27, she decided to become a single mother. She worked as a health counselor at a Basic Health Unit (UBS) and suffered a lot of stigma, even having a petition signed asking for her dismissal from the agency. Maria decided to resign and began to devote herself to sewing.

In an interview with TV Globo's Fantástico program, she stated that she was a former smoker, having smoked up to three packs of cigarettes a day.

== Filmography ==
=== Movies ===
Year	Title	Role	Note(s)
2019	Bacurau	Resident of Bacurau	
2025	The Secret Agent	Dona Sebastiana	
2025	Seu Cavalcanti		Fictional documentary
2025	O Dilema das Rosas	Marieta	Short film
2026	Yellow Cake	Dona Rita	
TBA	Almeidinha		
TBA	A Adoção		

=== Television ===
Year	Title	Role	Note(s)
2026	Delegado	Dudinha	

== Awards and nominations ==
Year	Prize	Category	Work	Result	Ref.
2025	Prêmio F5	Best Supporting Performance	The Secret Agent	Nominee	
2025	Santiago Critics Circle	Best Supporting Actress	The Secret Agent	Won	
