= The Secret Agent (2025 film) =

2025 film by Kleber Mendonça Filho

- Brazilian theatrical release poster
- Portuguese: O Agente Secreto
- Directed by: Kleber Mendonça Filho
- Written by: Kleber Mendonça Filho
- Produced by: Emilie Lesclaux
- Starring: Wagner Moura; Carlos Francisco; Tânia Maria; Robério Diógenes; Alice Carvalho; Gabriel Leone; Maria Fernanda Cândido; Udo Kier
- Cinematography: Evgenia Alexandrova
- Edited by: Eduardo Serrano; Matheus Farias
- Music by: Tomaz Alves Souza; Mateus Alves
- Production companies: CinemaScópio; MK Productions; One Two Films; Lemming Film; Arte France Cinéma
- Distributed by: Vitrine Filmes (Brazil); Port au Prince Films (Germany); Ad Vitam (France)
- Release dates: 18 May 2025 (Cannes); 6 November 2025 (Brazil and Germany); 17 December 2025 (France)
- Running time: 161 minutes
- Countries: Brazil; France; Germany; Netherlands
- Languages: Portuguese; German
- Budget: R$27 million ($5 million)
- Box office: $22.5 million

The Secret Agent (Portuguese: O Agente Secreto) is a 2025 political thriller film written and directed by Kleber Mendonça Filho. It follows Armando (Wagner Moura), a former professor caught in the political turmoil in the midst of the Brazilian military dictatorship, attempting to flee persecution. The supporting cast includes Carlos Francisco, Tânia Maria, Robério Diógenes, Gabriel Leone, Maria Fernanda Cândido, Alice Carvalho, and Udo Kier in his final film role.

The film had its world premiere at the 2025 Cannes Film Festival on 18 May, where it received widespread acclaim and became the festival's most awarded film, winning the Best Actor award for Moura, the Best Director award for Mendonça Filho, the Art House Cinema Award and the FIPRESCI Prize. At the 83rd Golden Globe Awards, it became the first Brazilian film nominated for Best Motion Picture – Drama, winning Best Actor in a Motion Picture – Drama (Wagner Moura) and Best Foreign Language Film. At the 98th Academy Awards, it was nominated for Best Picture, Best Actor for Moura, Best Casting and Best International Feature Film. It won four Grande Otelo Awards (Best Film, Cinematography, Art Direction, and Visual Effects).

It was theatrically released in Brazil and Germany on 6 November 2025 by Vitrine Filmes and Port-au-Prince Films, respectively, and was released in France on 17 December by Ad Vitam.

== Plot ==
In 1977, during the political turmoil of the Brazilian military dictatorship, former researcher Armando travels during the carnival holiday to Recife, where his young son Fernando has been living with his in-laws since the death of Armando's wife, Fátima. He arrives at a refuge operated by former anarcho-communist Dona Sebastiana, where he adopts the name Marcelo and befriends other political dissidents including Claudia, Haroldo and Angolan Civil War refugees Thereza Vitória and Antonio. Meanwhile, corrupt Civil Police chief Euclides and his sons Sergio and Arlindo are called in during the holiday to investigate a severed human leg that has been found inside a captured shark.

Armando is placed by his dissident network in a job at the city's identity card office under the alias "Marcelo", where he has a chance encounter with Euclides, who offers him his friendship and protection. Armando is visibly annoyed by Euclides's arrogant behaviour, which includes harassing Hans, a Jewish Holocaust survivor who is mistakenly assumed to be a Nazi fugitive. Armando's job also affords him the opportunity to search for files on his late mother, of whom he has few memories. Meanwhile, in São Paulo, hitmen Bobbi and Augusto are hired by former Eletrobras executive director Henrique Ghirotti to kill Armando, against whom he has a political and personal vendetta.

Armando meets Elza, the leader of a political resistance movement in the Brazilian northeast, at the Cinema São Luiz, where his father-in-law Sr. Alexandre works as a projectionist. Recording a testimony about Ghirotti's corrupt activities, Armando recounts a dinner he attended with Fátima that ended in a physical altercation with Ghirotti and his son, following remarks on the couple's lower socioeconomic class and supposed communist sympathies. Elza informs Armando that a contract killing has been ordered and instructs him to flee the country. Sergio and Arlindo dispose of the human leg in the Capibaribe River, where it suddenly revives and attacks gay men cruising in a public park at night; the story, presumably a newspaper cover-up for the political corruption and violence during the carnival week, creates a public frenzy. Augusto and Bobbi hire a local gunman, Vilmar, to find Armando. Anticipating a departure, Armando bids farewell to Dona Sebastiana and the other refugees.

The following day, Armando's cover is blown after Bobbi surveils Sr. Alexandre. Vilmar identifies Armando but fails to kill him, shooting Arlindo and another police officer. Bobbi, watching from afar, chases a bleeding Vilmar through Recife's city centre and is killed by Vilmar in a barbershop.

In the present day, history student Flavia researches Elza's resistance network through audio recordings and newspaper archives, learning that Armando was murdered and framed as a corrupt professor. Travelling to Recife, Flavia meets with Fernando, now a middle-aged doctor, who agrees to be interviewed after Flavia donates blood. The pair discuss Armando's political past and subsequent assassination, and the identity of Armando's mother "India". Fernando states he does not have a single memory of his father, but fondly recalls watching Jaws with his grandfather at a cinema which has since become the blood bank where he works.

== Cast ==
- Wagner Moura as Armando Solimões / Marcelo Alves and Fernando Solimões (adult)
- Enzo Nunes as Fernando Solimões (young)
- Gabriel Leone as Bobbi Borba
- Roney Villela as Augusto Borba
- Tânia Maria as Dona Sebastiana
- Carlos Francisco as Sr. Alexandre
- Robério Diógenes as Euclides
- Maria Fernanda Cândido as Elza
- Thomás Aquino as Valdemar
- Alice Carvalho as Fátima Nascimento
- Hermila Guedes as Claudia
- Isabél Zuaa as Thereza Vitória
- Italo Martins as Arlindo
- Igor de Araújo as Sergio
- Kaiony Venâncio as Vilmar
- Laura Lufési as Flavia
- Isadora Ruppert as Daniela
- Luciano Chirolli as Henrique Castro Ghirotti
- Udo Kier as Hans
- João Vitor Silva as Haroldo
- Aline Marta Maia as Lenira Nascimento
- Geane Albuquerque as Elisângela
- Suzy Lopes as Carmem
- Gregorio Graziosi as Salvatore Ghirotti
- Buda Lira as Anísio
- Marcelo Valle as João Pedro
- Licínio Januário as Antonio
- Robson Andrade as Clóvis

== Production ==
=== Development ===
Kleber Mendonça Filho wrote the script over three years, partially overlapping with the production of Pictures of Ghosts. It was co-produced by companies from Brazil (CinemaScópio, Itapoan and Vitrine Filmes), France (MK2 Films and Arte France Cinéma), Germany (One Two Films) and the Netherlands (Lemming Film). The film also received subsidies from the Brazilian Fundo Setorial do Audiovisual/Ancine, the French Centre national du cinéma et de l'image animée (CNC), the Dutch Netherlands Film Fund, and the German Medienboard Berlin-Brandenburg and German Federal Film Fund.

The film is a neo-noir historical political thriller, heavily inspired by Robert Altman, Brian De Palma, Sam Peckinpah, Martin Scorsese and Steven Spielberg productions of the 1970s. In a January 2026 Film at Lincoln Center event, Mendonça Filho curated some films that influenced The Secret Agent, including: John Boorman's Point Blank (1967), Karel Kachyňa's The Ear (1970), Elio Petri's Investigation of a Citizen Above Suspicion (1970), Jorge Bodanzky and Orlando Senna's Iracema (1974), Héctor Babenco's Lúcio Flávio (1977), Steven Spielberg's Close Encounters of the Third Kind (1977), and Eduardo Coutinho's Twenty Years Later (1984).

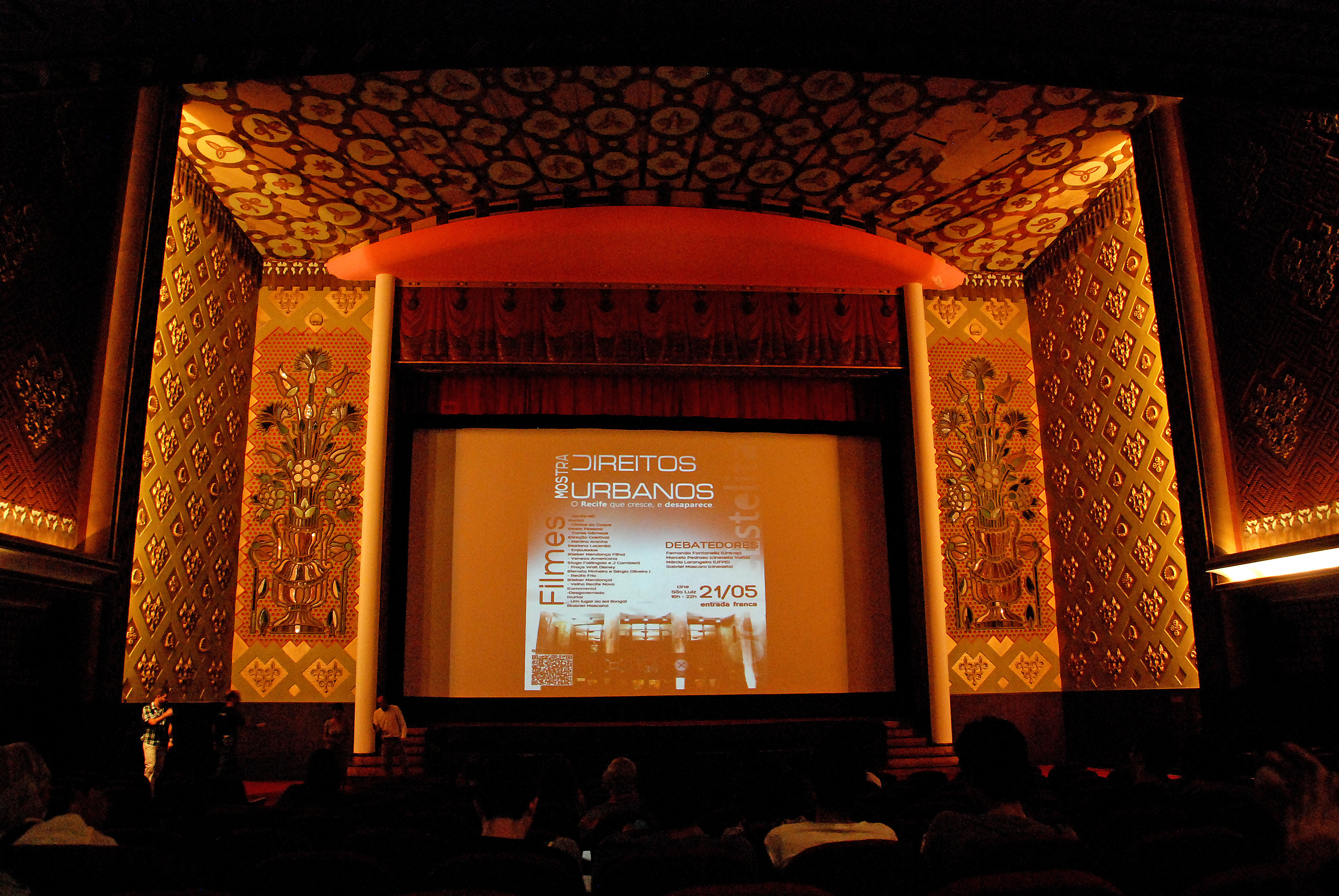
Cinema São Luiz, where some scenes take place.

The Secret Agent's main motifs also echo Spielberg's Jaws (1975), particularly in that Recife is a coastal city plagued by tiger shark attacks. Some scenes take place during a screening of Richard Donner's The Omen (1976) at the Cinema São Luiz.

Aspects of the "Hairy Leg" story are based on real newspaper reports from the late 1970s that created a public frenzy in Recife, particularly on the coverage by Diário de Pernambuco (Pernambuco Daily). The story allowed the press to disguise censored news about police violence, corruption and homophobia during the late years of the Brazilian Military Dictatorship. The typical Brazilian public phones known as "orelhão" are extensively used throughout the story by Armando, and also became a promotional symbol of the film.

The production marked Wagner Moura's first Portuguese language production in eight years. It was Udo Kier's final feature film role before his death in November 2025, in his second collaboration with Mendonça Filho following Bacurau (2019).

=== Filming ===
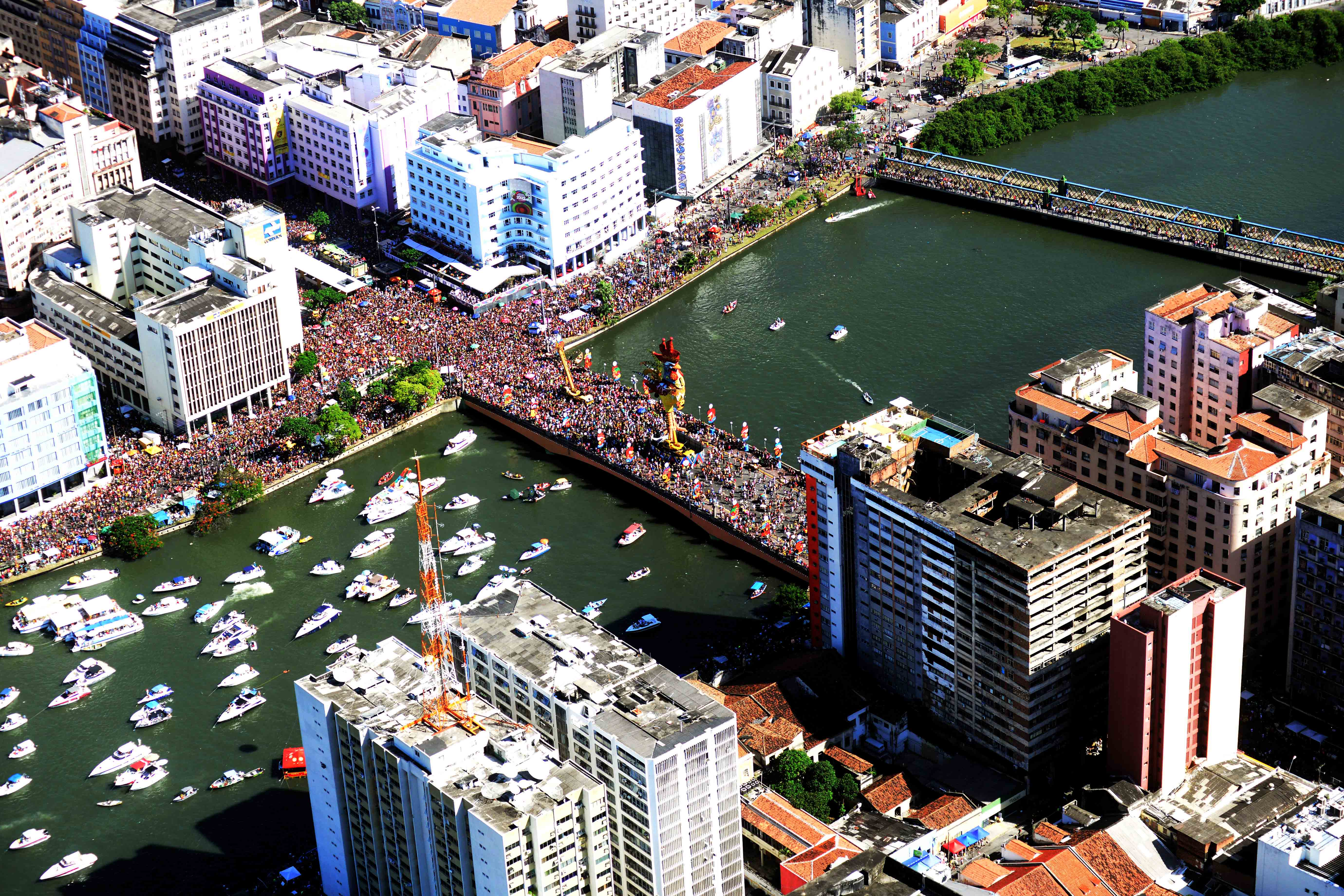
Carnival parade in Recife near Cinema São Luiz.

Principal photography took place over ten weeks in 2024, shooting on location in Recife, Pernambuco. Many scenes were filmed in historical buildings throughout the city, such as the Cinema São Luiz (one of the last art house cinemas in Brazil) and on several of Recife's colonial bridges. For the "hairy leg attack" scenes, shooting took place on location at the Capibaribe River, featuring its usual capybara inhabitants, and at "May 13th Park" (Parque 13 de Maio). Carnival scenes were reenacted near Aurora Street (Rua da Aurora), where Recife's main carnival parade take place. Scenes featuring the captured tiger shark and Armando's teaching past were shot at the Federal University of Pernambuco campus, a state owned university.

Additional scenes featuring Diógenes and Leone's characters were filmed in São Paulo. Principal photography wrapped by late August 2024. Pick-up scenes were shot in Brasilia in December 2024.

Mendonça Filho and his long-time partner Emilie Lesclaux produced the film through their film company CinemaScópio. The film also marks Russian-French cinematographer Evgenia Alexandrova's first collaboration with the filmmaker, who shot the film with Panavision anamorphic lenses and vintage camera equipment, aiming to replicate the visual style of the 1970s movies.

=== Post-production ===
The film entered post-production in September 2024, shortly after the 81st Venice International Film Festival where Mendonça Filho was a jury member for the main competition. As usual for the director's films, it features many MPB songs (Lula Cortês, Zé Ramalho, Ângela Maria, Waldick Soriano, Orquestra Nelson Ferreira, Banda de Pífanos de Caruaru) alongside its original score by Mateus Alves and Tomaz Alves Souza. It also features international pop songs from Chicago and Donna Summer, alongside Ennio Morricone's Guerra e Pace, Pollo e Brace from the Italian drama film Come Play with Me (1968).

== Release ==
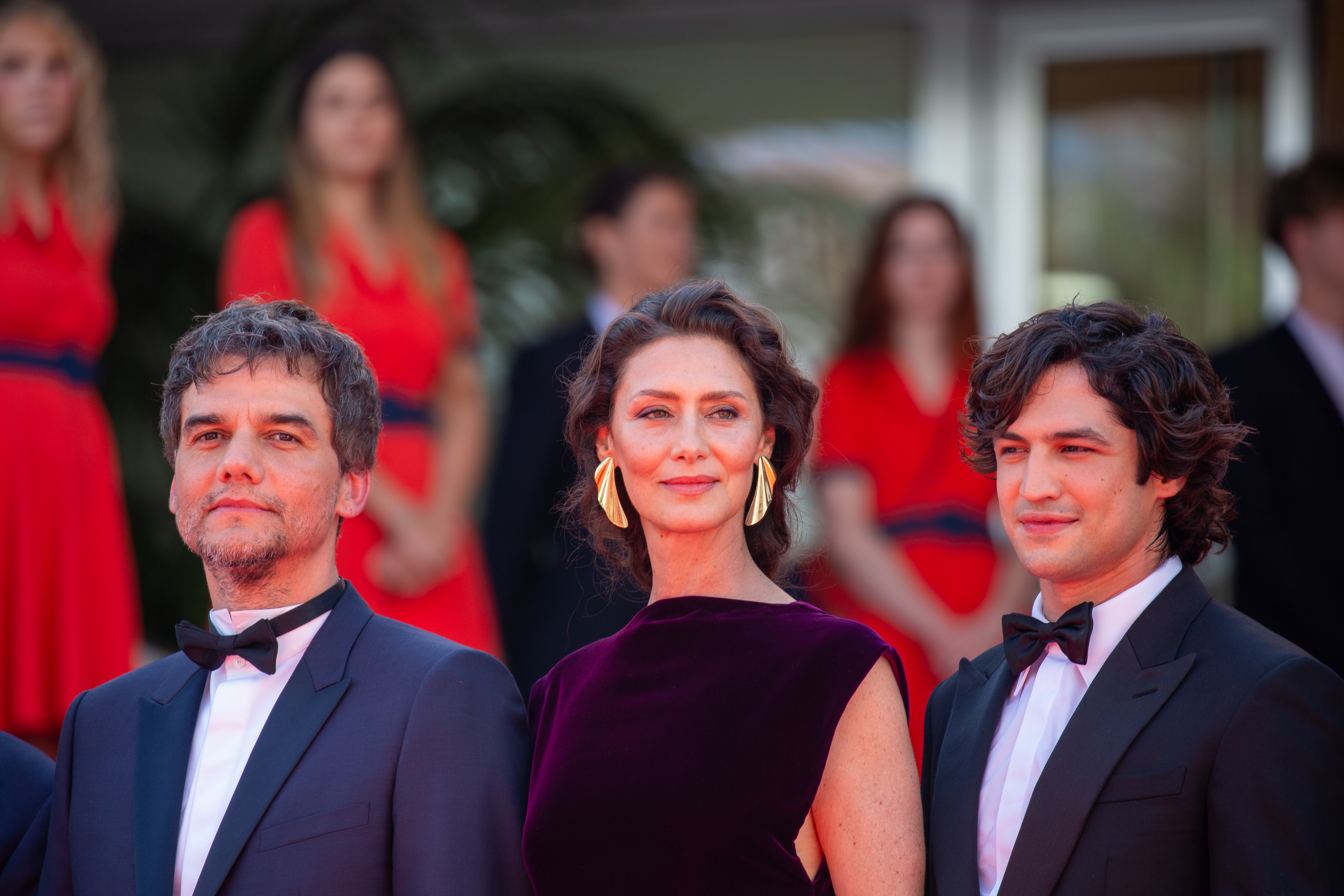
Moura, Cândido and Leone at the 2025 Cannes Film Festival

The film had its world premiere at the main competition of the 2025 Cannes Film Festival on 18 May, receiving a 13-minute long standing ovation, and was the most awarded film in the festival. It competed for the Palme d'Or, winning the Best Actor prize for Wagner Moura (the first Brazilian actor to win it) and the Best Director prize for Mendonça Filho (the second Brazilian filmmaker to win it after Glauber Rocha in 1969). A few days after its premiere, Neon acquired North American distribution rights to the film, while Mubi acquired the rights for the United Kingdom, Ireland, Hispanic America, and India.

The Secret Agent had its North American premiere at the Main Program of the 52nd Telluride Film Festival. At the 2025 Toronto International Film Festival it received a gala screening in the Special Presentations section. It was also screened at the Main Slate at the 2025 New York Film Festival. In October, it was screened in the Best of 2025 section of the 20th Rome Film Festival, the Thrill strand of the 69th BFI London Film Festival, and at the Adelaide Film Festival.

The film's Brazilian premiere took place on 10 September 2025 at the Cinema São Luiz.

It received a wide theatrical release in Brazil and Germany on 6 November 2025. Neon released the film in North American theaters on 26 November. It received a theatrical release on 17 December by Ad Vitam in France.

== Reception ==
=== Box office ===
On its opening weekend in Brazil, The Secret Agent had 273,000 admissions, grossing R$6.6 million at the box office, topping Predator: Badlands debut weekend (R$5.7 million) and Black Phone 2 fourth weekend (R$1.8 million). By the end of its first full week, alongside September and October previews, the film had surpassed 500,000 admissions and R$10 million at the box office. By 16 March 2026, The Secret Agent had 2.5 million admissions in Brazil, grossing R$52 million ($9.9 million) and surpassing Bacurau as Mendonça's highest-grossing film.

In its limited release weekend in the United States, The Secret Agent grossed $71k on the 5-day opening Thanksgiving holiday, with an average $23k per theatre, beating I'm Still Here’s previous record for Brazilian productions opening weekend in the U.S. By 19 March 2026, the film had grossed $4.3 million in its limited 312 theatres run at the U.S. box office.

On its opening weekend in France, The Secret Agent had more than 100,000 admissions, grossing $726k over 186 theatres. By 1 February 2026 the film had grossed $3.3 million at the French box office with +400,000 admissions, bringing its international box office total to $12.6 million.

=== Critical response ===
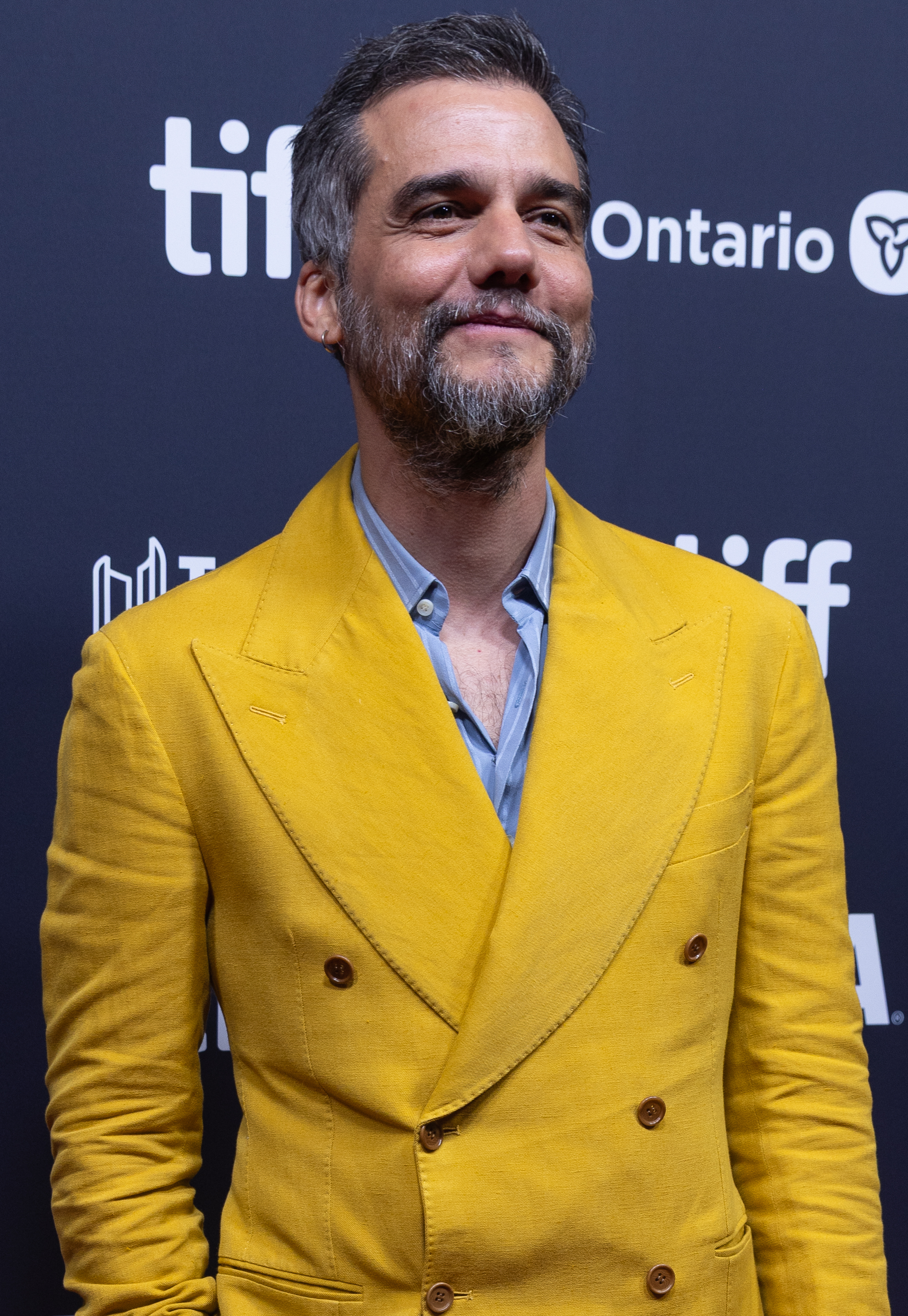
Wagner Moura garnered widespread critical acclaim for his performance and earned an Academy Award nomination for Best Actor, becoming the first Brazilian and South American actor nominated in this category.

On the review aggregator website Rotten Tomatoes, 98% of 221 critics' reviews are positive, with an average rating of 8.7/10. The website's consensus reads: "A thematically rich and visually arresting political thriller, The Secret Agent blends grindhouse stylization with biting social commentary to weave a vividly dangerous yet darkly human tale." Metacritic, which uses a weighted average, assigned the film a score of 91 out of 100, based on 40 critics, indicating "universal acclaim". On AlloCiné, the film received an average rating of 4.6 out of 5, based on 38 reviews, from French critics.

Steve Pond of TheWrap pointed out that "cohesiveness or coherence are not high on its list of attributes [...] but its messiness is part of its charm and part of the point". David Ehrlich of IndieWire gave the film a 'B+' score, concluding that "the movie — always compelling, but sometimes more sedate than its material demands — is often at its most alive during its detours".

Other critics praised the film for its ambition, visual style, and emotional depth. Shannon Connellan of Mashable called it "a complex, time-jumping political crime thriller" and wrote that its "compelling script, impeccable acting, and striking 1970s aesthetic" make it "impossible to look away." Pavel Snapkou of Showbiz by PS described the film as "a bright and memorable" neo-noir political thriller, praising its "vivid, vibrant scenes" and calling Moura "electrifyingly good," delivering "one of the best male performances of the year." Carlos Aguilar of The Playlist hailed the film as "an imposing masterpiece steeped in history and a palpable adoration for cinema." Critic Matt Zoller Seitz named The Secret Agent as the second best film of 2025, behind the Palestinian film From Ground Zero, stating in his review that "Once in a while, you see a movie that doesn't feel made, but extracted from a dreaming mind.... If you're willing to bend with the story, 'The Secret Agent' will take you places movies rarely go."

=== Oscar submission process ===
Despite Mendonça Filho having been passed over twice by the Brazilian submission commission for the Academy Award for Best International Feature Film, for two critically acclaimed productions, Aquarius in 2016 (due to the political boycott of the Temer administration) and Bacurau in 2019 (during the Bolsonaro administration), The Secret Agent was expected to be the country's safe choice after its successful run in the 2025 Cannes Film Festival and the ongoing Neon strong awards season campaign.

By August, the film was shortlisted alongside five other Brazilian feature films. Shortly after, reports emerged suggesting a possible snub in favor of Manas (2024), which was supported by a lobby of 70 high-profile companies for its supposed "urgent subject in Brazil". The movement created a public uproar driven by the perception of abuse of political and personal power in the Brazilian Oscar submission process, instead of artistic merit and commercial logic.

Following the negative response to the Manas campaign from critics and the Brazilian film industry, which included a four-minute long video by Fernanda Torres supporting selection of The Secret Agent, the latter was ultimately chosen as the country's official submission on 15 September.

=== Accolades ===
At the 2025 Cannes Film Festival, The Secret Agent was the festival's most awarded film, winning the Best Actor award for Moura, the Best Director award for Mendonça Filho, the Art House Cinema Award and the FIPRESCI Prize for Best Film.

At the 2025 New York Film Critics Circle Awards, it was also the most awarded film (alongside One Battle After Another), winning Best Foreign Language Film and Best Actor (Wagner Moura). At the 2025 Los Angeles Film Critics Association Awards, it won Best Foreign Language Film and was the runner-up for Best Picture and Best Lead Performance. At the 2025 National Society of Film Critics Awards, he won Best Film Not in the English Languange, securing the critics’ trifecta and becoming the first Brazilian film to accomplish that feat. At the 31st Critics' Choice Awards, it won Best Foreign Language Film and was nominated for Best Actor. At the 83rd Golden Globe Awards, it became the first Brazilian production nominated for Best Motion Picture – Drama, and Moura the first Brazilian to win for Best Actor in a Motion Picture – Drama, while the film also won for Best Foreign Language Film.

At the 98th Academy Awards, it was nominated for Best Picture, Best Actor for Moura, Best Casting and Best International Feature Film. This marks the second year in a row that a Brazilian film was nominated for Best Picture.

It won 7 awards, including Best Ibero-American Film, Best Director for Mendonça Filho and Best Actor for Moura, at the 13th Platino Awards.

It won 4 Grande Otelo Awards out of 18 nominations: Best Film (shared with Manas), Cinematography, Art Direction, and Visual Effects.

Furthermore, The Secret Agent placed fifth in the Sight & Sound international poll for the best films of 2025. Among other publications, it was also named the best film of the year on The Hollywood Reporter's top 10 "Best Films of 2025", placed fourth on Cahiers du Cinéma top 10 films of 2025, sixth on BBC's 25 Best Films of 2025, eighth on The New York Times' "Best Movies of 2025", one of the Top 5 International Films of the year by the National Board of Review, and also appeared on former President of the United States Barack Obama's annual list of his favorite films of the year. According to CriticsTop10.com, it was included on 281 lists with 15 ranking it at the top spot.

== See also ==
- List of submissions to the 98th Academy Awards for Best International Feature Film
- List of Brazilian submissions for the Academy Award for Best International Feature Film
