= Marcelino Freire =

Brazilian writer

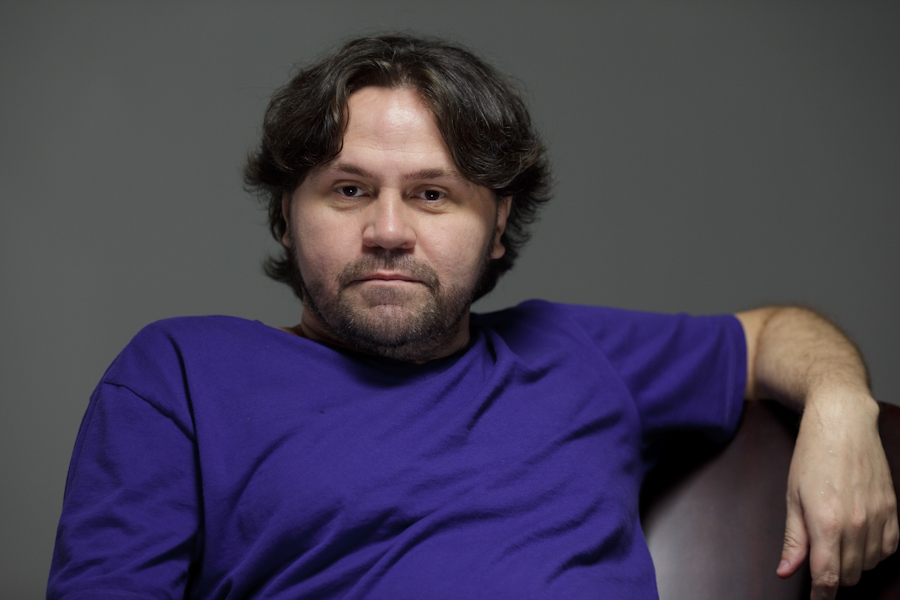
- Born: Marcelino Juvêncio Freire; 20 March 1967 (age 58); Sertânia, Pernambuco, Brazil
- Occupation: Writer

Marcelino Freire (born 20 March 1967) is a Brazilian writer and cultural producer.

Freire is best known for his short story collection Contos negreiros which won the Prêmio Jabuti in 2006 and for his debut novel Nossos ossos, which won the National Library of Brazil Machado de Assis Prize for Best Novel in 2014; it was also nominated for both the Jabuti and the São Paulo Prize for Literature. Other titles include Amar é Crime, Angu de Sangue, BaléRalé and Bagageiro.

His writings often deal into themes such as violence, marginalisation and masculinities.

== Life and career ==
Born in Sertânia in the state of Pernambuco, Freire was the youngest of nine children. He moved with his family to Paulo Afonso, Bahia, in 1969. He remained there for six years, before returning to Pernambuco and settling in the capital, Recife, where he began performing theater. In 1981, he wrote his first plays in this genre, along with a group of visual artists and writers from the city. Throughout the 1980s, he worked as a bank clerk and began a Literature course at the Catholic University of Pernambuco, but did not complete it.

In 1988, he attended the writer Raimundo Carrero's literary workshop and, two years later, received an award from the Pernambuco state government. In 1991, he moved to São Paulo, where he worked in an advertising agency and started publishing his writings in 1995.

Since 2006, Freire promotes in São Paulo the Balada Literária, an event which combines music, literature and arts; the event also had editions in Bahia, Pernambuco and Piauí. He also teaches creative writing classes.

== Personal life ==
In interviews, Freire said jokingly he is a "non-observing" homosexual.

== Published works ==
- AcRústico (aphorisms, 1995, self-published)
- EraOdito (aphorisms, 1st edition,1998; 2nd edition, 2002, self-published)
- Angu de Sangue (short stories, Ateliê Editorial, 2000)
- BaléRalé (short stories, Ateliê Editorial, 2003)
- Os cem menores contos brasileiros do século (as organizer; microfiction, Ateliê Editorial, 2004)
- Contos Negreiros (short stories, Editora Record, 2005)
- Rasif - Mar que Arrebenta (short stories, Editora Edith, 2008)
- Amar é crime (short stories, Editora Edith, 2010)
- Nossos ossos (novel, Editora Record, 2013)
- Bagageiro (essays, Editora José Olympio, 2018)
- Escalavra (novel, Amarcord, 2024)

== Awards ==
- 2006 Jabuti Prize- 1st place in the Short Story category, for Contos Negreiros.
- 2014 National Library of Brazil Machado de Assis Award for Best Novel, for Nossos Ossos.
