= Alice Carvalho =

Brazilian actress

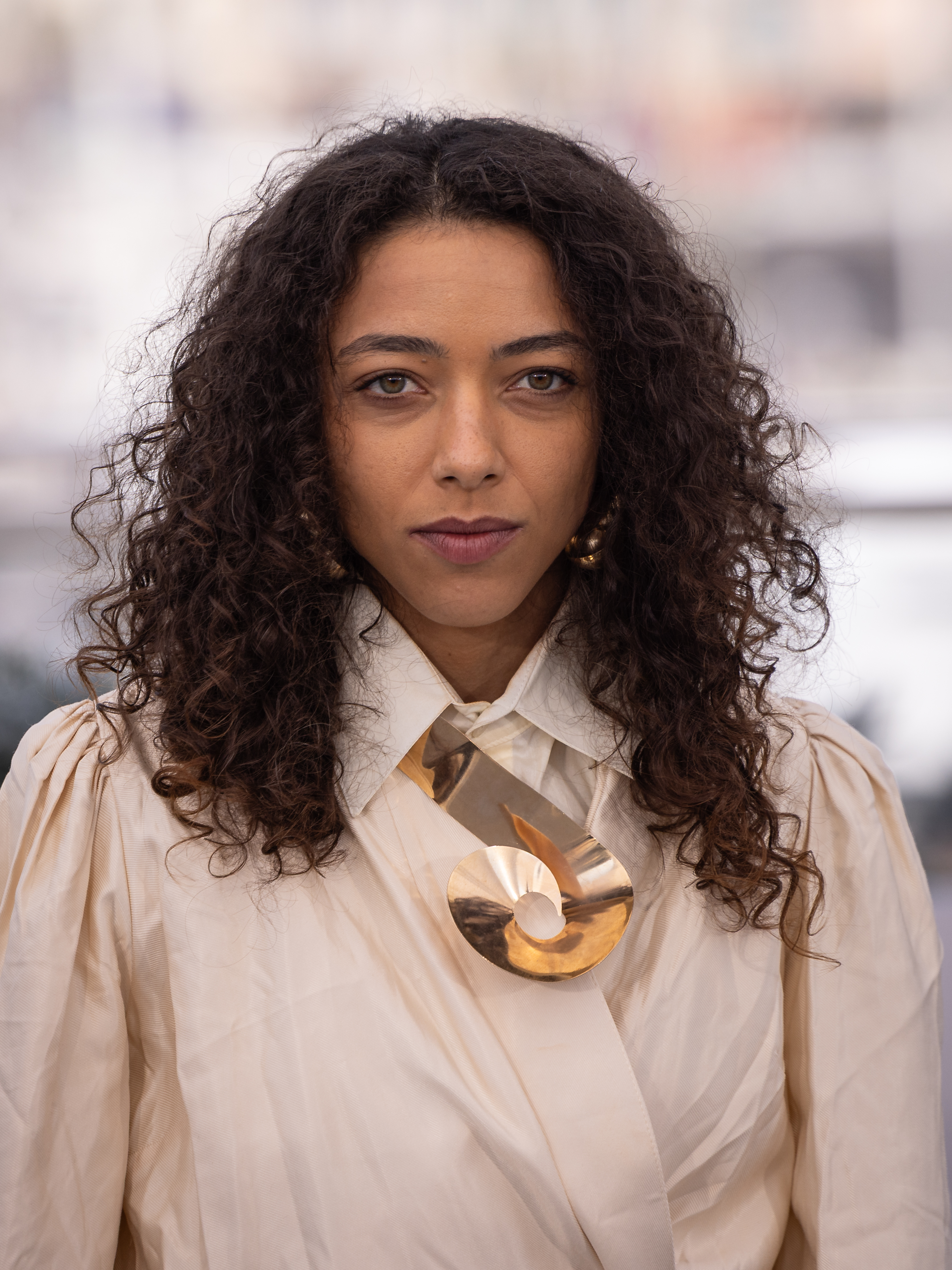
- Carvalho at the 2025 Cannes Film Festival
- Born: Alice Gabrielle Affonso Carvalho; 15 June 1996 (age 30); Natal, Brazil
- Occupations: Actress, screenwriter and singer
- Years active: 2016–present

Alice Gabrielle Affonso Carvalho (Natal, 15 June 1996) is a Brazilian actress, screenwriter, and singer. Most known for portraying Dinorah in Prime Video's Brazilian drama series New Bandits (2023).

== Early life ==
Alice Carvalho was born in the city of Natal, Rio Grande do Norte, and raised in the city of Parnamirim. As a child, she first encountered theater as a form of therapy to alleviate hyperactivity.

== Career ==
After several auditions and rejections as a teen, Carvalho experimented creating stories alongside other screenwriters and friends, starting with the web series SEPTO in 2016, which she portrayed Jéssica Borges, a young triathlete who tries to live her father's dream of competing in the Olympic Games.

She portrayed Amanda in the second season of the web series Manu. She was also a guest star in the first season of TV Globo's drama series Segunda Chamada. She also worked as director, screenwriter, and star of the music video for the song A vida é curta demais pra viver depois, by the musical group BaianaSystem.

In 2021, Carvalho was confirmed to star in the Brazilian action-drama series New Bandits, for Amazon Prime Video, where she portrayed Dinorah Vaqueiro. Marking her first lead role.

Carvalho transitioned to Brazilian telenovelas (soap-operas) in 2024, starring in a supporting role in TV Globo's Renascer. In 2025, she was also in the main cast of Globoplay's Guerreiros do Sol. filmed in 2023. Later that year, she made her debut as a singer, collaborating with the band BaianaSystem and singer Anitta on the song Balacobaco.

Also in 2025, she had a small cameo as Fátima Nascimento in the drama film The Secret Agent, directed by Kleber Mendonça Filho. The film won the Golden Globe Award for Best Non-English Language Film and was nominated for the Academy Award for Best International Feature Film.

== Personal life ==
She is openly bisexual.
