= New Bandits =

2023 Brazilian TV series

- Cangaço Novo
- Genre: Drama; Crime fiction
- Created by: Mariana Bardan Eduardo Melo
- Written by: Fernando Garrido; Mariana Bardan; Eduardo Melo; Erez Milgrom
- Directed by: Aly Muritiba (Season 1); Fábio Mendonça
- Starring: Allan Souza Lima; Alice Carvalho; Thainá Duarte; Hermila Guedes
- Country of origin: Brazil
- Original language: Portuguese
- No. of seasons: 2
- No. of episodes: 15

Production
- Camera setup: Single-camera
- Running time: 40-60 minutes
- Production companies: Amazon Prime Video; 02 Filmes

Original release
- Network: Prime Video
- Release: 18 August 2023 – present

New Bandits (Cangaço Novo) is a Brazilian action drama television series produced by Prime Video in association with O2 Filmes. Its first season premiered on August 18, 2023 on the streaming platform. The series was renewed for a second season in April 2026. Set in the sertão region of the Brazilian Northeast, New Bandits tells the story of a São Paulo bank clerk who finds a family background of banditry. The series is an exemplar of the Nordestern (Northeast+Western) genre.

== Synopsis ==
Ubaldo (Allan Souza Lima), a São Paulo bank clerk, finds his roots in the fictional town of Cratará, in the Northeast state of Ceará. The son of Amaro Vaqueiro, a legendary former bandit, he reconnects with his sisters, Dilvânia (Thainá Duarte) and Dinorah (Alice Carvalho) whom he never knew he had, and is gradually drawn into the brutal world of modern-day cangaço. Caught between violence, power, and family, Ubaldo must choose between remaining the ordinary man he has always been or embracing the criminal legacy that awaits him.

== Cast ==
- Allan Souza Lima : Ubaldo Vaqueiro / Amaro Vaqueiro
- Alice Carvalho : Dinorah Vaqueiro
- Thainá Duarte : Dilvânia Vaqueiro
- Marcelia Cartaxo : Zeza (Syzélia) Vaqueiro
- Hermila Guedes : Leinneane
- Ricardo Blat : Ernesto
- Daniel Porpino : Paulino Leite
- Luiz Carlos Vasconcelos : Deocleciano Maleiro
- Bruno Bellarmino : Gastão Maleiro
- Ênio Cavalcante : Jeremias
- Adélio Lima : Sabiá
- Rodrigo Garcia : Ameaço
- Joálisson Cunha : Tirolesa
- Pedro Lamin : Lino
- Pedro Wagner : Moeda
- Bruno Goya : Sivirino
- Arthur Canavarro : Silvestre
- Rafael Amancio : Perigoso
- Robson Medeiros : Tomada
- Nivaldo Nascimento : Virulento
- Jorge Paz : Duzentos
- Rubens Santos : Facão
- Black Jr : Delegado Pixinga
- Guilherme Leal : Ubaldo (jovem)
- Valentina Marques : Dinorah (menina)
- Gaby Lopes : Dilvânia (menina)

== Awards and nominations ==
| Year | Award | Categoriy | Nomination | Result | Ref. |
|---|---|---|---|---|---|
| 2023 | Prêmio Potências | Actress of the Year | Alice Carvalho | Won | |
| 2023 | Prêmio APCA de Televisão | Series — Fiction | Cangaço Novo | Nominated | |
| 2023 | Prêmio APCA de Televisão | Breakthrough | Alice Carvalho | Won | |
| 2023 | Prêmio Faz Diferença (O Globo) | Cinema and Series | Cangaço Novo | Nominated | |
| 2024 | Prêmio Grande Otelo do Cinema Brasileiro | Best Fiction Series | Cangaço Novo | Won | |
| 2024 | Prêmio Grande Otelo do Cinema Brasileiro | Best Actor in a Fiction Series | Allan Souza Lima | Nominated | |
| 2024 | Prêmio Grande Otelo do Cinema Brasileiro | Best Actress in a Fiction Series | Alice Carvalho | Won | |
| 2024 | Prêmio Grande Otelo do Cinema Brasileiro | Best Actress in a Fiction Series | Thainá Duarte | Nominated | |
| 2024 | Prêmio ABC (Associação Brasileira de Cinematografia) | Best Photography Direction in a TV Series | Azul Serra, ABC | Won | |
| 2024 | Prêmio ABC (Associação Brasileira de Cinematografia) | Best Sound in a TV Series | George Saldanha, ABC, Anderson Ferreira, Alessadro Laroca, Guilherme Marinho and Eduardo Virmond | Won | |
