= The Hairy Leg =

Brazilian urban legend

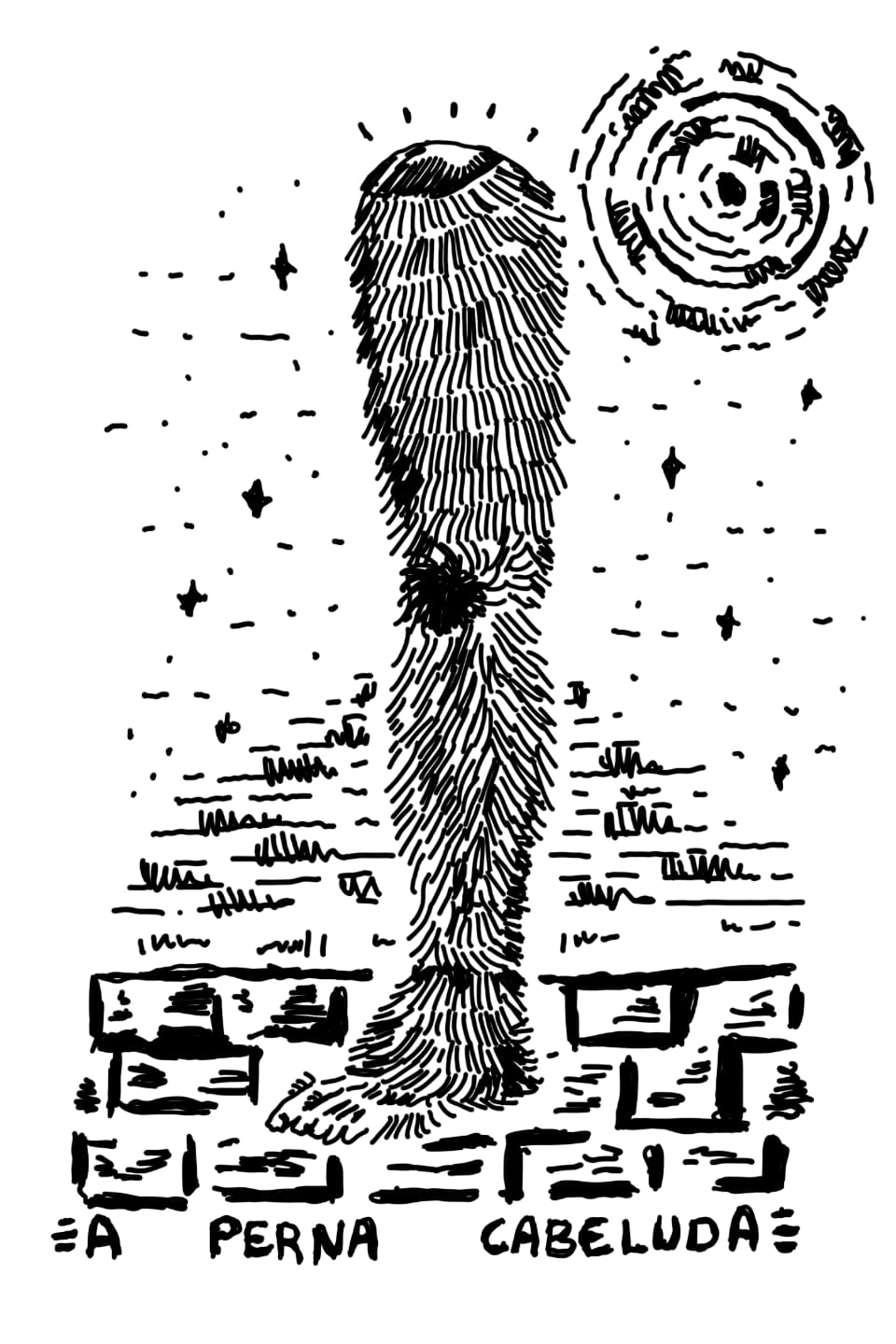
- Illustration of the Hairy Leg

Creature information
- Other name: Perna cabeluda (Portuguese)
- Grouping: Urban legend
- Sub grouping: Ghostly entity

Origin
- First attested: Diario de Pernambuco (10th of December 1975)
- Country: Brazil
- Region: Recife, Brazil
- Details: A detached, hairy human leg which attacks people during the night.

The Hairy Leg (Portuguese: perna cabeluda) is a Brazilian urban legend that originated in the city of Recife. It was conceived by the newspaper Diário de Pernambuco (Note: transl. 'Pernambuco Daily') during the Brazilian military dictatorship in the 1970s. The newspaper used fictional narratives about the Leg to replace and signal material that had been censored by the regime. The creature is described as a hairy human leg that attacks people at night by tackling and kicking them. After its first reports in Diário de Pernambuco, the Hairy Leg quickly became established in Recife's popular imagination. Radio programmes, literature, carnival songs and floats all featured the Hairy Leg, although reports of the creature generated public fear in Recife during the first years of its appearance. Over the decades the Hairy Leg has been reappropriated in music, comics, and cinema. The film The Secret Agent (2025) (Portuguese: O Agente Secreto) incorporated it as a central element of its narrative.

== History ==
The legend of the Hairy Leg emerged during the Brazilian military dictatorship, when prior censorship (limiting or banning speech before it is published) was in full force. During this period, journalists could not accurately report crimes committed by the police or the army. As a result, several Brazilian newspapers developed creative strategies to signal censorship without directly confronting it. While Jornal da Tarde (Note: transl. 'Evening Newspaper') published recipes in place of censored news and O Estado de S. Paulo (Note: transl. 'The State of S. Paulo') used excerpts from Os Lusíadas (Note: transl. 'The Lusiads'), a Portuguese poem, Diário de Pernambuco (Note: transl. 'Pernambuco Daily') opted to publish fictional narratives about supernatural events. The column was called Romance Policial (Note: transl. 'Police Novel') and was proposed by the then editor Og Fernandes (Minister of the Brazilian Superior Court of Justice as of 2024), who was frustrated by the censorship. The Hairy Leg became a code word for assaults by armed forces, and the absurd story helped sell newspapers. Journalists also used the Leg to report cases of violence against women, which were also censored by the dictatorship.

=== First reports: Tiúma's 'phantom leg' ===
The first documented record took place on 10 December 1975, when Diário de Pernambuco reported the alleged appearance of a "phantom leg" at the residence of José Luís Borges and his son Wanderley in the Tiúma neighbourhood of São Lourenço da Mata, a municipality of Pernambuco. The Leg walked on the walls, hung from the roof, and transformed itself into animal shapes such as fish, butterfly or bat. The topic continued to be covered in subsequent news reports in the following days, never identifying the author. On 11 December 1975 the newspaper published an article saying that the haunting had been going on for 20 days and that residents of other neighbourhoods also reported seeing the Leg, and that the local priest had refused to assist.

=== Popularisation ===
Journalist Jota Ferreira is considered by his colleagues to be responsible for bringing the legend to the wider public through the radio programme Repórter do Recife. (Note: transl. 'Recife Reporter') To cover for a lack of news in one day's programme, Ferreira brought in the account of a woman he met at Hospital da Restauração, Recife's biggest hospital, who was allegedly attacked by a hairy leg. However, there are no detailed records of the daily content of Repórter do Recife, leaving doubts as to when that broadcast took place in relation to the various texts about the Leg published in Diário de Pernambuco.

According to O Povo (Note: transl. 'The People') journalist Arthur Albano, the description of the Leg as being "hairy" was rather popularised by columnist Paulo Fernando Craveiro on 21 January 1976. Up to that day, the press called the apparition "phantom leg". In his column on Diário de Pernambuco, Craveiro lamented: "As if floods and droughts weren't enough, the people of Pernambuco are now hearing about the terrifying story of a hairy leg going around frightening people". (Note: Portuguese: "Como se já não bastassem as enchentes e as estiagens, o pernambucano toma conhecimento agora da infernal história de uma perna cabeluda que anda por aí amedrontando as pessoas.")

According to BBC News Brasil, the Hairy Leg became established in Recife's popular imagination on 1 February 1976 through Raimundo Carrero, reporter for Diário de Pernambuco. Without mentioning the first reports by Diário de Pernambuco, he told the story of a leg which jumped like saci-pererê (a one-legged character from Brazilian folklore) and tormented women. For the first time, the Hairy Leg was described as tackling and kicking people and depicted in an illustration.

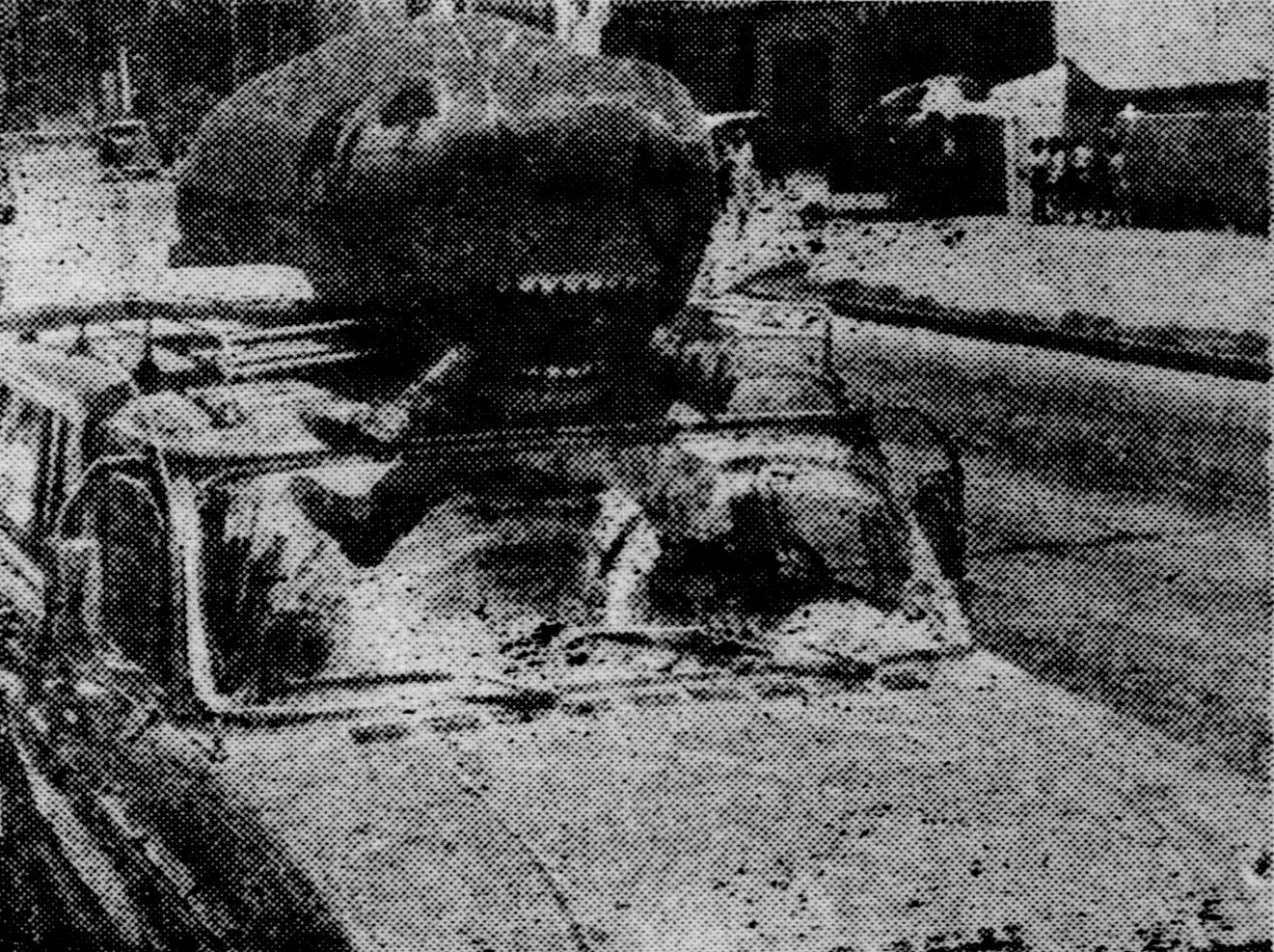
A Chevrolet transformed into a float for the 1976 Recife Carnival. The sculpture above the car depicts a shark from the film Jaws carrying a hairy leg in its mouth.

The story of the Hairy Leg was also disseminated in cordel literature (booklets sold by street vendors) such as José Soares' A Perna Cabeluda de Tiuma e São Lourenço (Note: transl. 'The Hairy Leg of Tiúma and São Lourenço') and A Perna Cabeluda de Olinda. (Note: transl. 'The Hairy Leg of Olinda') The Hairy Leg was the third most recurring theme in cordel literature at the time, behind two important regional figures, Father Cícero and Lampião. Journalist Ricardo Noblat reported that José Soares sold over 39,000 copies of his booklets during the first months of 1976. Inspired by his work, composers Dimas Sedícias and Joel Santos released the frevo song The Hairy Leg at the 1976 Recife Carnival. In a float competition during that year's Carnival in Recife, one of the finalists was a Chevrolet decorated with a shark (inspired by Steven Spielberg's Jaws, released months earlier) carrying the Hairy Leg in its mouth. From 1976 until 1978, carnival clubs named Hairy Leg appeared with banners depicting the Leg in various municipalities of Pernambuco.

=== Impact on the population ===
The stories about the Hairy Leg caused such fear that residents avoided leaving their homes at night. Housewives reported that the figure always appeared in the late afternoon. The legend also spread to Ceará, a neighbouring state. Newspapers reported cases of people being attacked after mocking the Hairy Leg, which further contributed to the collective panic. In an attempt to calm the population, Diário de Pernambuco published an article without authorship on 13 December 1975 titled "Ghost leg is an invention of the people". The article features a priest saying that the ghost leg has no ground in reality. It also features a babalorixá (a priest of Afro-Brazilian religions) who describes the appearance of the Hairy Leg as a good thing, suggests cleansing with salt water and smudging, and offers his services free of charge to "solve or explain the phenomenon of the phantom leg".

According to Roberto Beltrão, writer and researcher of Pernambuco hauntings, the fear in Recife lasted about two years. Afterwards, it became a joke and inspiration for songs and carnival themes. Psychoanalyst and urban legend researcher Márisson Fraga stated that the rumour found "fertile ground" after Recife's great flood of 1975 and amid the repression of the military regime.

== Cultural legacy ==
=== Cinema ===
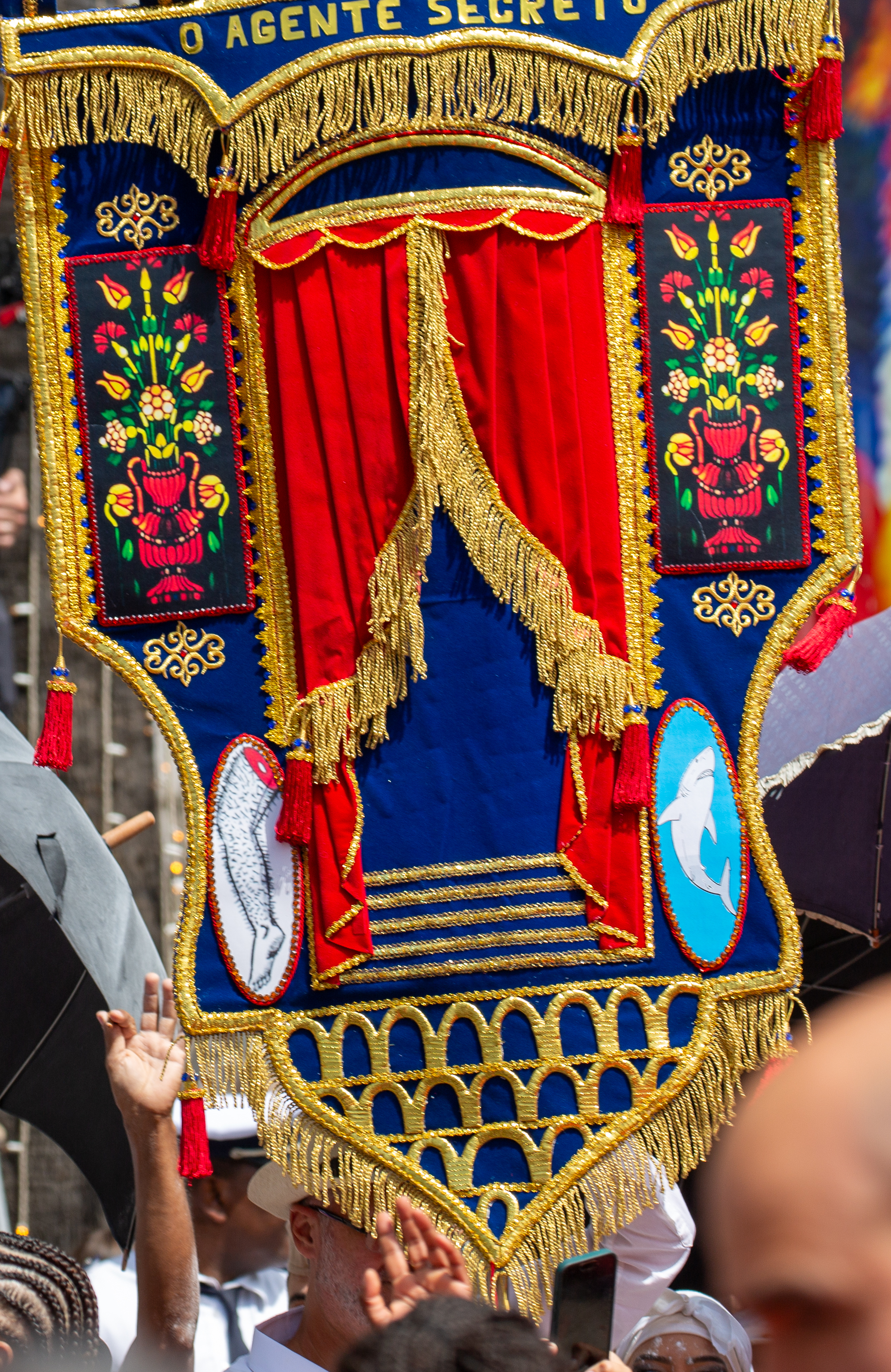
Banner carried by the cast of The Secret Agent to the 2025 Cannes Film Festival. In the lower left corner, there is an image of the hairy leg.

In 2025, the film The Secret Agent (Portuguese: O Agente Secreto) incorporated the Hairy Leg as a central element of its narrative. In the film, which takes place in Recife during the 1977 carnival, the discovery of a human leg inside a shark's mouth inspires the fictional press to write narratives about the Hairy Leg. The producers also took the model of the Hairy Leg used in the film to its first screenings at the São Luiz cinema, in Recife, and to the Cannes Film Festival.

The Hairy Leg was also revived in the 2025 film Recife Assombrado 2 - A Maldição de Branca Dias. (Note: transl. 'Haunted Recife 2 - The Curse of Branca Dias') As a marketing strategy for the film's release, an eight-metre-high sculpture of the Hairy Leg was installed at the Rio Branco square in Recife.

=== Comics ===
In 2015, writer André Balaio and artist Téo Pinheiro published a comic book about the return of the Hairy Leg, tormenting people "in the present day".

=== Music ===
The manguebeat band Chico Science & Nação Zumbi mentioned the Hairy Leg in the 1994 song "Banditismo Por Uma Questão de Classe", (Note: lit. transl. "Banditry for Reasons of Class") from the album Da Lama ao Caos. (Note: transl. 'From Mud to Chaos') The song states: "Galeguinho do Coque [a famous Recife criminal] wasn't afraid, he wasn't / He wasn't afraid of the Hairy Leg".

== Bibliography ==
- Braga, J. P. R.; Ecco, C. (2023). "A perna cabeluda: Violência sobrenatural e factual na cidade do Recife" [The hairy leg: Supernatural and factual violence in the city of Recife]. PARALELLUS - Revista de Estudos de Religião. 14 (35). Universidade Católica de Pernambuco: 539–559. doi:10.25247/paralellus.2023.v14n35.p539-559. ISSN 2178-8162.
