= Parelhas =

Municipality in Rio Grande do Norte, Brazil

Coordinates: 6.68778°S 36.6578°W

- Municipality
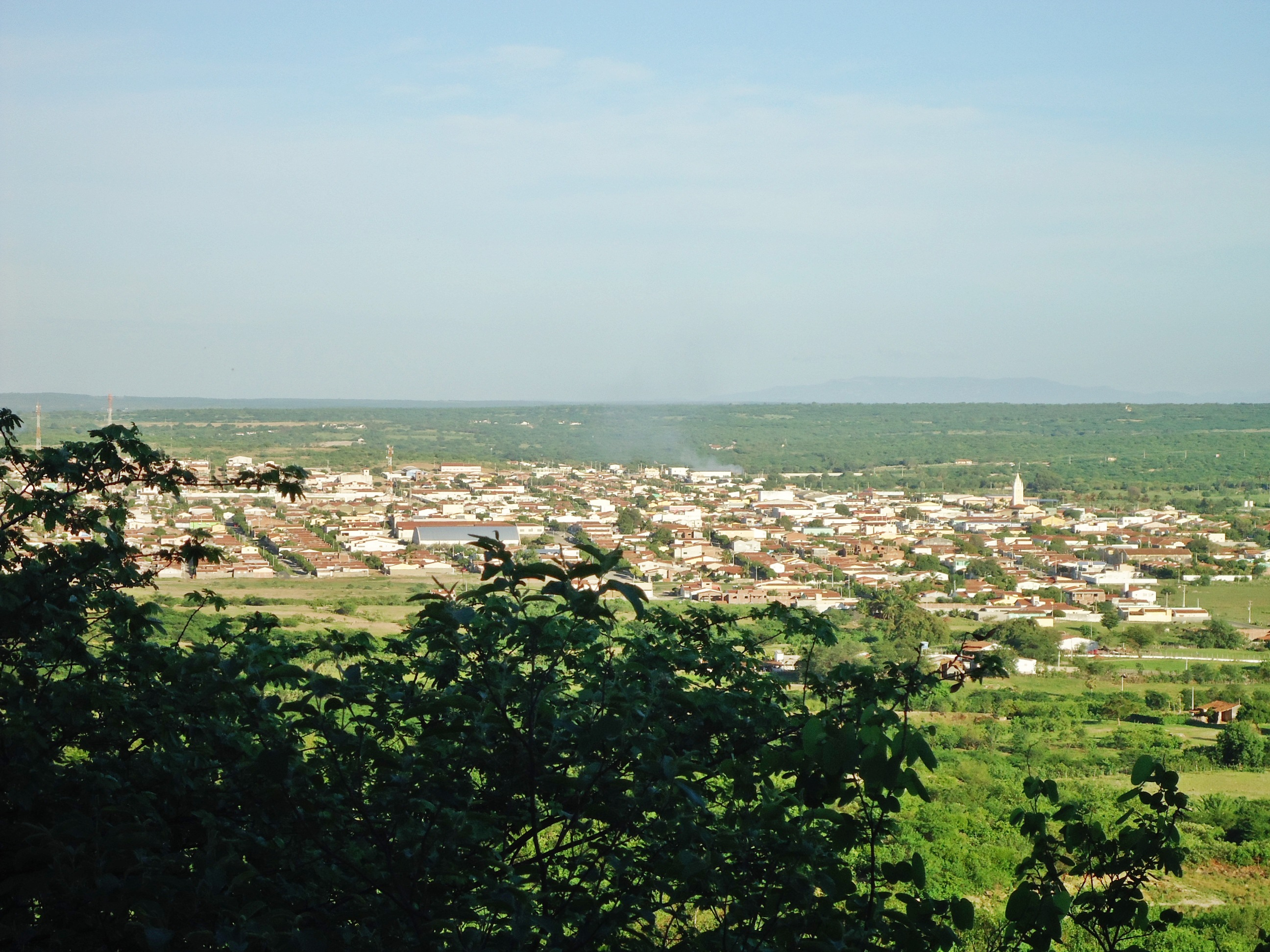

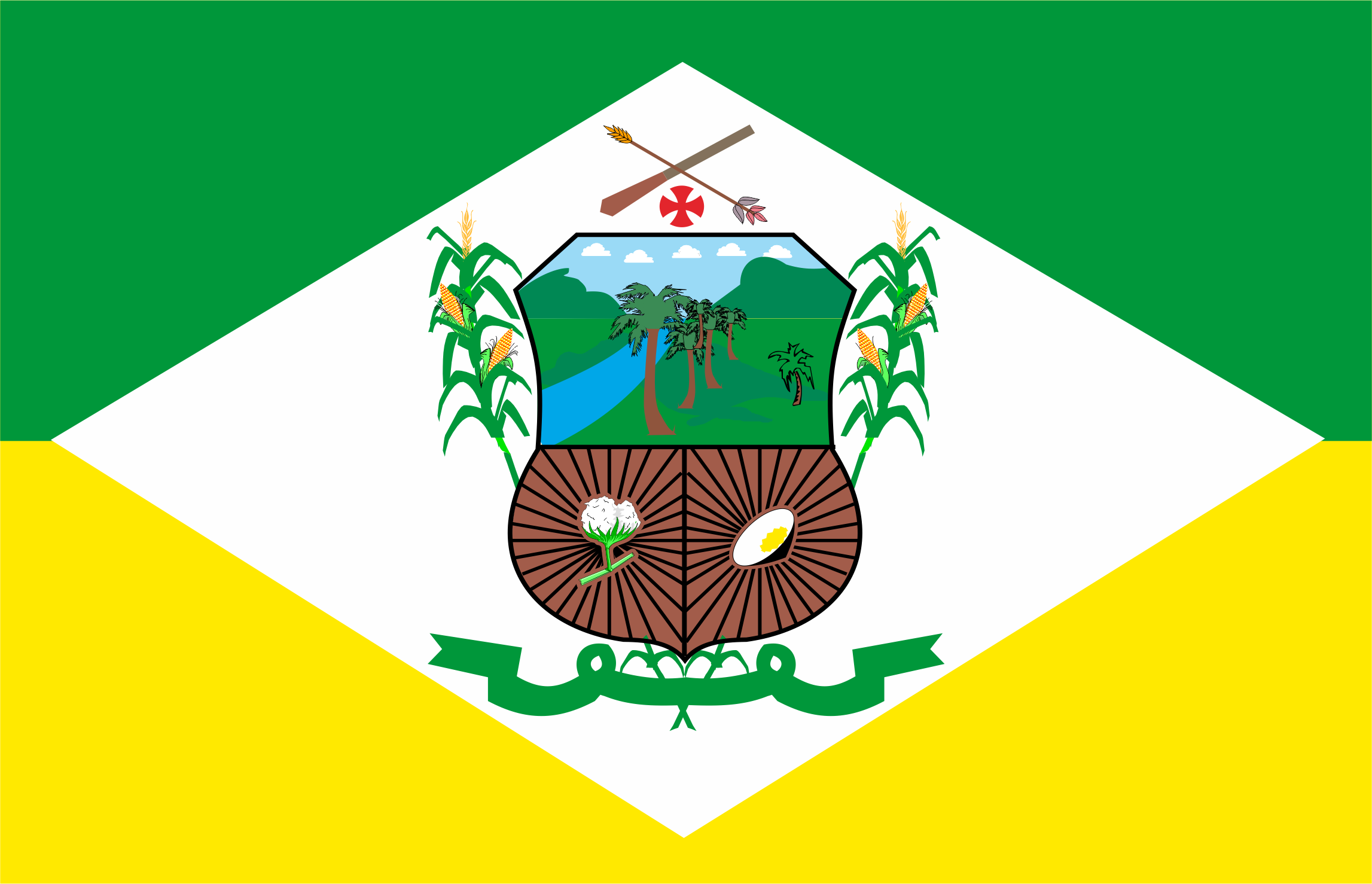
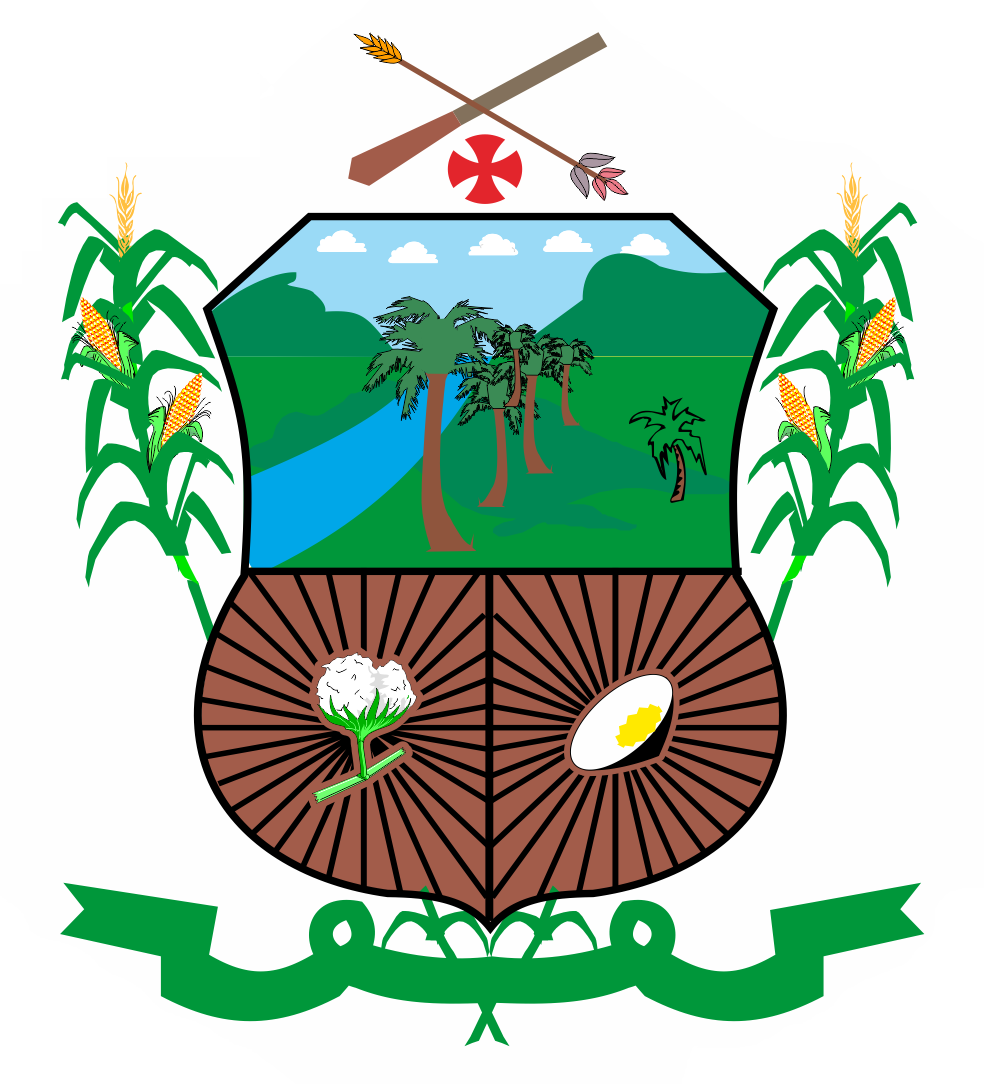
- Flag Coat of arms
- Interactive map of Parelhas
- Country: Brazil
- Region: Nordeste
- State: Rio Grande do Norte
- Mesoregion: Central Potiguar

Population (2020)
  - Total: 21,545
- Time zone: UTC−3 (BRT)

Parelhas is a municipality in the state of Rio Grande do Norte in the Northeast region of Brazil.

== See also ==
- List of municipalities in Rio Grande do Norte
