= Brazilian National Library Literary Prizes =

- Sponsored by: National Library of Brazil
- Country: Brazil
- Established: 1995
- Website: https://www.gov.br/bn/pt-br/atuacao/cooperacao-e-difusao/premio-literario

The Brazilian National Library Foundation Literary Prizes (Portuguese: Prêmios Literários da Fundação Biblioteca Nacional), also called Prêmio Literário Biblioteca Nacional aim to recognize the intellectual quality of works published in Brazil. The awards are organized by the National Library Foundation and the first edition took place in 1995.

== History ==
In 1995, the first awarding of the then-called Brazilian Literature and Book Incentive Awards took place, with a total of seven Brazilian authors awarded in the categories of novel, short story, social essay, poetry, literary essay, translation and graphic artist, each named in honor of a representative in their field, respectively Machado de Assis, Artur de Azevedo, Sérgio Buarque de Holanda, Alphonsus de Guimaraens, Mário de Andrade, Paulo Rónai and Aloísio Magalhães (the latter name only being defined the following year).

In 1998, the Aloísio Magalhães Award began to be formally defined as an award given to graphic design. The following year, the Machado de Assis Prize began to include novels and short stories, thus discontinuing the Artur de Azevedo Prize.

In 2003, there was no award, and the following year, all the awards were combined into one, called the National Library Foundation Award, for the best book of the year. In 2005, however, all the awards that had existed until 2002 returned to being awarded individually, with two changes: the Machado de Assis Award returned to being exclusively for novels, and the Clarice Lispector Award for short stories was created (although the award for best book of short stories, from 1995 to 1998, was named after Artur de Azevedo, the decision was made to honor Clarice Lispector in the re-creation of the award).

In 2007, on the occasion of the 15th anniversary of the National Library Foundation's Reading Incentive Program, a prize for children's and young people's literature was created, named in honor of Glória Pondé. In 2012, this award began to focus solely on young people's literature, and a separate award for children's literature was created, named in honor of Sylvia Orthof.

Due to the COVID-19 pandemic, the Aloísio Magalhães Award was not awarded between 2020 and 2022. Evaluating entries in the graphic design category would have required receiving physical copies and then sending them to the judging committee. This would have been impossible due to the implementation of a remote work regime at the National Library. The other categories were maintained because entries could be submitted entirely online.

In 2023, the Akuli Prize was created, focusing on stories from the oral traditions of Indigenous, Quilombola, and riverside communities. The prize is named after Akuli Taurepang, a young sage from the Arekuná tribe and a storyteller of ancestral stories. He was responsible for transmitting the story of Makunaímã to the German scientist Theodor Koch-Grünberg, who later became instrumental in Mário de Andrade's work Macunaíma.

During the 2023 awards ceremony, the president of the National Library Foundation, Marco Lucchesi, announced the creation of two new awards for the following year: illustration and comics, whose names pay homage, respectively, to Carybé and Adolfo Aizen.

== Categories ==
- Short story (Prêmio Clarice Lispector), since 2005
- Literary essay (Prêmio Mario de Andrade), since 1995
- Social essay (Prêmio Sérgio Buarque de Holanda), since 1995
- Oral tradition stories (Prêmio Akuli), since 2023
- Comics (Prêmio Adolfo Aizen), since 2024
- Illustration (Prêmio Carybé), since 2024
- Children's literature (Prêmio Sylvia Orthof), since 2012
- Youth literature (Prêmio Glória Pondé), since 2007
- Poetry (Prêmio Alphonsus de Guimaraens), since1995
- Graphic project (Prêmio Aloísio Magalhães), since 1995
- Novel (Prêmio Machado de Assis), since 1995
- Translation (Prêmio Paulo Rónai), since 1995

=== Discontinued ===
- Short story (Prêmio Artur de Azevedo), from 1995 to 1998
- Bookod the year (Prêmio Fundação Biblioteca Nacional), in 2004

=== Prêmio Artur de Azevedo ===
Year	Winners	Finalists	Notes
1995	A Noite Escura Mais Eu Lygia Fagundes Telles	No information	
1996	Keith Jarrel no Blue Note Silviano Santiago	No information	
1997	Objetos Turbulentos José J. Veiga	No information	
1998	As Palavras Secretas Rubens Figueiredo / Companhia das Letras	No information	

=== Prêmio Fundação Biblioteca Nacional ===
Year	Winners	Finalists	Notes
2004	Não Augusto de Campos	Sem informação	
