= Diário de Pernambuco =

Brazilian newspaper

Diario de Pernambuco
- Type: Daily newspaper
- Format: Berliner
- Owner(s): Grupo Diario de Pernambuco (78%); Diários Associados (22%)
- Founder: Antonino José de Miranda Falcão
- President: Carlos Frederico de Albuquerque Vital
- Editor-in-chief: Tatiana Notaro
- Founded: 7 November 1825; 200 years ago
- Language: Brazilian Portuguese
- Country: Brazil
- Website: diariodepernambuco.com.br

Diario de Pernambuco (Pernambuco Daily) is a newspaper published in Recife, Brazil. The newspaper began publication on 7 November 1825. It is the oldest continuously circulating daily in Latin America and the oldest continuously circulating newspaper edited in Portuguese.

== See also ==
- List of newspapers in Brazil
- The Hairy Leg
