= Terry Woods (Emmerdale) =

Fictional character from Emmerdale

- Emmerdale character
- Portrayed by: Billy Hartman
- Duration: 1995–2011
- First appearance: 2 February 1995
- Last appearance: 13 January 2011
- Introduced by: Mervyn Watson
- Spin-off appearances: The Dingles Down Under (1997)
In-universe information
- Occupation: Manager of The Woolpack; Co-owner of The Grange B&B; Chauffeur
- Father: Duke Woods
- Wife: Britt Woods (until 1995); Dawn Woods (2003–2004)
- Sons: Thomas Carter; T.J. Woods

Terry Woods is a fictional character from the British television soap opera Emmerdale, played by Billy Hartman. He was one of the longest-serving characters in the show up until he was killed off alongside Viv Hope (Deena Payne) in early 2011, after 16 years.

== Development ==
Hartman said he found his audition for the role daunting. Terry was meant to be a former rugby player and there were five "really huge blokes" also waiting to audition, which made Hartman think he had come for the wrong job. He was given the role and was paired with Michelle Holmes who was cast as Terry's wife, Britt Woods. It was known that Holmes was only staying for six months and Hartman assumed that he would be leaving too, which is why he accepted the part. He admitted that he never wanted to appear in a soap opera, but came to realise that it often led to major roles in other shows. Hartman made his first appearance as Terry on 2 February 1995.

Terry and Britt's relationship soon runs into problems, which are exacerbated when they are offered the chance to run a pub in York. Britt decides to take the job as she hopes that it will actually improve their marriage, but Terry is not so sure. Hartman told Victoria Ross of Inside Soap: "He is truly in love with Britt but their marriage just isn't working out. Britt thought that by moving on they could make a fresh start, but Terry stood up to her for once. He realised that their problems wouldn't just vanish because of a change of location." Terry decides to make a final plea to Britt and visits her in York in an attempt to bring her home with him, but she refuses to return to Emmerdale. Back in the village, Terry begins drinking heavily and Alan Turner (Richard Thorp) tries to help him out. Hartman reckoned the development would lead to the pair forming a good friendship. He told Ross that his character was starting to feel at home in the village, and the trouble with Britt meant that he and Alan had started getting along better.

== Storylines ==
When Terry and his wife, Britt arrive in Emmerdale, no one is impressed by their brash attitude. As managers of the Woolpack, the couple have a pivotal position in the community but are unable to stay out of trouble with landlord Alan Turner, who disapproves of their lifestyle. Although Terry dotes on Britt, it is clear their marriage is in trouble and things become further strained when Britt reveals to Terry that her father, Ronnie Slater (Ian Thompson) sexually abused her as a child. When they are offered their own bar in York, Britt goes alone. The marriage limps on but Terry discovers that Britt is having an affair with brewery boss Gerald Taylor (Blair Plant), who Terry punches on Boxing Day after he winds him up. The couple later divorce.

Now single, Terry takes up ballroom dancing with Viv Windsor (Deena Payne) wife of his best friend, Vic (Alun Lewis). After a while, they begin an affair and when Vic finds out, Viv and their daughter, Donna (Sophie Jeffrey), move into the Woolpack with Terry. Terry and Viv's relationship does not last and she and Donna go back to live with Vic and his daughter Kelly. Terry's job at the Woolpack comes to a violent end in 1998 when he sleeps with his boss, Alan's, granddaughter, Tricia Stokes, only to discover she is also sleeping with Scott Windsor (Ben Freeman). When he exposes Tricia's lack of morals in front of the entire village at Kelly Windsor's (Adele Silva) 18th birthday party in the village hall, Alan punches Terry and fires him.

Terry then goes away for a few weeks to sort himself out and returns on Christmas Day. He goes to visit Vic at the post office and discovers his body after he has been killed by Billy Hopwood (David Crellin) during a robbery. In 1999, Terry starts working for Chris Tate (Peter Amory). Terry is there for Chris when he needs someone to talk to and Chris knows he can trust Terry with anything, leading to a strong friendship between the two men. Terry is saddened when Chris commits suicide in September 2003.

Terry later develops feelings for Woolpack barmaid Louise Appleton (Emily Symons) but she is dating businessman Ray Mullan (Seamus Gubbins). When Louise realises she is being stalked, she thinks Terry is responsible but eventually learns that Ray is her stalker. When the truth comes out on Christmas Day 2002, Louise and Ray fight and she accidentally kills him. She calls Terry for help and they cover up Ray's death. Thinking their relationship had developed, Terry tries to kiss Louise but she rejects him. Needing a break, he goes on holiday to Spain and whilst there, falls in love with a young woman called Dawn (Julia Mallam), and she comes back to Emmerdale with him. Only then does Terry discover that she is his friend Bob Hope's (Tony Audenshaw) daughter. They are soon engaged, horrifying Dawn's parents. Despite their objections, Terry and Dawn marry and in 2003, Dawn discovers that she is pregnant.

Shortly after Terry and Dawn's son, Terry "TJ" Woods (Connor Lee) is born, Terry has a serious stroke and nearly dies. He clings to life and Dawn helps nurse him back to health. However, Dawn struggles with caring for Terry and T.J, putting their marriage under strain and Terry was heartbroken when Dawn left him for Scott, now her stepbrother. After a brief custody battle, Terry and Dawn's relationship improves and their lives become more stable.

In the meantime, Louise discovers that she has feelings for Terry after all and they get together and decide to buy the B&B from Alan. However, Louise is attracted to Matthew King (Matt Healy) and is unable to resist when he starts flirting with her. Soon they begin an affair behind Terry's back. It goes on for weeks and Terry finds out when Louise ends their relationship just as they are about to complete the sale of the B&B. After Louise is moves in with Matthew, he loses interest in her and realising her mistake, Louise begs Terry for a second chance but he is not interested.

He throws himself into work and takes a job as Tom King's (Kenneth Farrington) chauffeur. When Bob marries Viv again, Terry spends the night with Jean Hope (Susan Penhaligon), Bob's ex-wife and Dawn's mother, and they agree it was a one-off but eventually start seeing each other again. When Dawn is imprisoned for benefit fraud, Jean is devastated and Terry struggles to look after TJ and the trauma brings them back together. They begin a relationship but determined to keep it a secret, Jean flirts with Tom King, but the relationship is exposed when Terry and Jean are caught having sex in public and are arrested. Tom, feeling foolish, sacks them both so they decide to buy the B&B from Alan. Terry could not afford to buy it when he and Louise split up so Jean agrees to go into business with him, deciding to sell her hotel in Spain. Unfortunately it emerges that she could not afford to go into business with Terry but Louise jumps at the chance, selling her share of The Woolpack to Val Lambert (Charlie Hardwick). Jean is unhappy about this but she and Louise eventually come to an agreement.

Dawn finds out about Terry and Jean's relationship when she is released from prison and furiously insists that they end it but Jean refuses. Dawn goes to Newquay to think things over and clear her head and when she returns, Dawn tells them that she and T.J are moving to Cornwall. Hurt at the prospect of losing contact with his son, Terry threatens to sue for custody but backs down when he realizes that he is tearing the family apart. On the day Dawn and T.J are due to leave, TJ is with Terry for the day so Dawn could pack but Terry returns T.J later than planned, so he and Dawn miss their flight. While waiting for Terry, Donna (now Verity Rushworth) persuades Dawn to go and see her and her husband Marlon's (Mark Charnock) new home at the Kings River development, along with the rest of the village. During the opening there is a huge gas explosion, making the show home collapse, and Dawn dies after suffering internal injuries. Although Terry is sad Dawn has died, he is relieved not to lose his son and gains custody of T.J. Dawn's family, however, are devastated and Dawn's father, Bob, and brother, Jamie (Alex Carter), begin a campaign for justice for her. Jean grows tired of Bob's obsession and asks Terry to talk sense into him. When Tom offers compensation, Jean accepts as she sees it as the Kings admitting liability and plans to leave the country with T.J for a fresh start. When Terry finds out, he races to the airport to stop her but she and T.J leave for Morocco. Terry is devastated. Terry holds a grudge against Tom for losing him contact with his son and when Tom is murdered on Christmas Day 2006, Terry is a prime suspect. Shortly after Tom's death, Terry disappears and returns with T.J a few weeks later after going to Morocco and persuading Jean to give him back. He is questioned by the police as a suspect in the murder investigation but is released without charge.

Terry's father, Duke (Dicken Ashworth), arrives in the village in June 2007. Louise had seen Duke Wood appearing as a guest on The Jeremy Kyle Show, speaking out against anti-social young men. Duke's friend, Andrea Hayworth (Cathy Tyson), persuades Terry to ask Duke to visit for a while in the hope they would reconcile. They do not reconcile completely but learn to respect each other a little more. Duke hopes that Terry and Andrea will get together, as they are both single parents. Andrea is keen to embark on a relationship but Terry is not.

Terry is scared when T.J is admitted to hospital in 2008 after food poisoning strikes the village and the surrounding area. T.J contracts E coli and a possible cause is Jo Sugden's (Roxanne Pallett) organic goat cheese. Jo is cleared and Environmental Health tells Jo and Terry that a local supermarket is responsible. Since then, Terry concentrates on looking after his son and his business. After his former girlfriend Viv is imprisoned for fraud, Terry and Jamie, now living with him, ask Bob and their twins to move in with them arguing that Bob needs help with childcare and the twins are company for T.J. Terry later embarks on a relationship with Brenda Walker (Lesley Dunlop). T.J does not like her at first but comes round eventually. Brenda moves in with Terry and T.J and eventually convinces Terry to sell the B&B to Eric (Chris Chittell) and Val Pollard. Brenda is later angry with Terry when she discovers that her adopted daughter Gennie (Sian Reese-Williams) had slept with Bob whilst Viv was in prison. Bob had told Terry but Terry lets Bob stay with him and T.J briefly after Viv throws him out. Terry begins work as a limousine driver with Rodney Blackstock (Patrick Mower).

In December 2010, Terry becomes close to Viv again after she is robbed numerous times. He helps Viv install a new lock on the flat door, and after injuring his hand, he looks for a first aid kit and discovers items lost in the burglaries and an alleged mugging Viv claimed had occurred when she had been taking the money from the till to the bank. Terry confronts Viv, and she tells him that she faked some of the burglaries and the mugging to get Bob's attention as she had been feeling lonely after their split. Terry reassures Viv, and she promises never to do anything like that again. Terry later invites Viv over for drinks with him and Brenda, and they get on well, much to Brenda's discomfort. After Christmas, Terry encourages Viv to move on from Bob, find a new boyfriend, and take salsa dancing classes again. Viv agrees and asks Terry to come with her as she felt he had been a good dance partner before. Terry agrees and decides not to tell Brenda for fear of her getting the wrong idea. Viv mistakes Terry's friendliness as a sign that he wanted to restart their relationship and on 11 January 2011, when he drops her off at the café, she kisses him. Terry hesitates at first then goes home. He later confides in Bob what happened with Viv and he tells Bob that he intends to set her straight and goes to visit her. Unbeknownst to Terry, Brenda sees him as he enters the café. Viv is waiting in the flat with a bottle of wine and Terry explains to her that they cannot be together as he is with Brenda. He also explains that she is a special friend to him and that he was trying to cheer her up. Viv accepts his explanation and Terry leaves and goes home. Brenda confronts him about his meetings and dance classes with Viv and accuses him of having an affair with her. Terry denies it but before he can tell her the truth, they hear shouts outside and are told the houses are on fire and that they should leave their home in case it spreads. Terry packs a bag and gets T.J ready but Brenda continues to pester him about Viv. Terry takes Brenda and T.J to Carl King's (Tom Lister) house and goes back to help with the rescue effort. Terry finds out that Viv is trapped in the shop with the twins and he and Bob go into the building to rescue them, despite Brenda begging Terry not to go. Bob gets out safely after rescuing the twins but Terry is not with him. The post office and shop explodes and Terry and Viv are killed. Brenda is devastated when the chief firefighter tells them that the ferocity of the blaze means that he had to remove his men from the building. Brenda breaks down as she comes to terms with the fact that Terry is dead and regrets arguing with him and Bob remarks that both his wife and his best friend have gone.
