= List of Emmerdale characters introduced in 2003 =

The following is a list of characters that first appeared in the British soap opera Emmerdale in 2003, by order of first appearance.

== Jean Tate ==
Jean Tate
- Emmerdale character
- Portrayed by: Megan Pearson
- Duration: 2003–2005
- First appearance: 24 January 2003
- Last appearance: 22 September 2005
- Introduced by: Steve Frost
In-universe information
- Father: Scott Windsor
- Mother: Zoe Tate
- Grandfathers: Frank Tate; Reg Dawson
- Grandmothers: Viv Hope
- Uncles: Chris Tate
- Aunts: Donna Windsor; Kelly Windsor (adoptive)
- First cousins: Noah Dingle; April Windsor; Elliot Windsor; Nicky Miligan

Jean Tate is the daughter of Zoe Tate (Leah Bracknell) and Scott Windsor (Ben Freeman). She appeared from 2003 to 2005.

Jean is conceived during a one-night stand between Zoe and Scott whilst Zoe, a lesbian, was suffering from schizophrenia. Jean is named after Zoe's mother. Her father is unknown until Scott comes forward after confessing to his mother Viv Hope (Deena Payne) and her husband Bob Hope (Tony Audenshaw) while Jean is in hospital following an accident when she fell off a table. Eventually, Zoe allows Scott access to Jean but then plans to leave for New Zealand. Scott takes Zoe, Jean and her cousin Joseph hostage at gunpoint. Viv eventually talks Scott round and Zoe, Joseph and Jean leave the village.

== Freda Danby ==
Freda Danby
- Emmerdale character
- Portrayed by: Lyn Paul
- Duration: 2003, 2005
- First appearance: 10 February 2003
- Last appearance: 4 December 2005
- Introduced by: Steve Frost (2003); Kathleen Beedles (2005)

Freda Danby is an acquaintance and former dance partner of Jarvis Skelton. In February 2003, Jarvis entered a dancing competition with Edna Birch. He was surprised to see Freda there after hearing her laugh with the barman. The pair of them caught up on old times and Jarvis then told her he wanted more than just to be dance partners. He was dismayed to find out Freda was already in a relationship with her current dance partner, Roger.

Two years later, Freda returns to Emmerdale in late 2005 when Jarvis holds a tea dance, which took place at the village hall in Emmerdale. He was shocked when Freda arrived and stormed out, believing he was set up. After dancing together, Freda offered Jarvis the chance to live in Spain with her. He accepts her offer and they leave the village in December 2005.

== Jean Hope ==
Jean Hope
- Emmerdale character
- Portrayed by: Julie Higginson (2003-2004); Susan Penhaligon (2006)
- Duration: 2003–2004, 2006
- First appearance: 17 February 2003
- Last appearance: 15 December 2006
- Introduced by: Steve Frost
In-universe information
- Husband: Bob Hope (backstory; married twice)
- Sons: Jamie Hope
- Daughters: Dawn Woods
- Grandsons: T.J. Woods

Jean Hope is the first wife of Bob Hope (Tony Audenshaw) and the mother of Dawn Woods (Julia Mallam) and Jamie Hope (Alex Carter) as well as the grandmother of T.J. Woods (Connor Lee). They were married twice in the 1980's, however Bob abandoned her and his children, leaving her to bring them up alone in Spain. She originally appears between 2003 and 2004 played by Julie Higginson on a recurring basis, however returns in 2006 being played by Susan Penhaligon as a regular cast member. Jean first appears in February 2003, when she and her daughter Jean meet Terry Woods (Billy Hartman) in Spain where he is on holiday, staying in the hotel which Jean runs. Dawn and Terry then fall in love and return to the UK, being followed by Jean. They subsequently get married, much to the disapproval of Bob and Jean, but are later delighted by the arrival of their baby boy, Terry Junior (T.J.), but the marriage didn't last. Jean was then worried about Dawn bringing up T.J. alone after Terry suffered a stroke after T.J.'s birth and with little money.

In 2006, Jean returned to Emmerdale as a regular character when she decided to attend Bob's second wedding ceremony to his fourth wife Viv Hope (Deena Payne) in the place of her son Jamie. However, she had a plan to try and win Bob back and kidnapped him on the morning of his wedding, but managed to escape and successfully married Viv, leaving Jean to get drunk in shame and wake up with Terry. Dawn was subsequently imprisoned after being reported for benefit fraud by Scott Windsor (Ben Freeman) leaving Jean and Terry to share responsibilities for T.J., bringing them closer together and subsequently falling in love. To keep the relationship secret, she began dating Tom King (Kenneth Farrington), who she made believe that they had a future together until Jean and Terry were arrested and locked in a cell for a night for cavorting in a layby. The incident meant that Dawn ordered her to end the relationship and she decided to move to Cornwall and take T.J. with her, breaking Terry's heart. Not long afterwards, Dawn was killed when the King's showhome blew up and collapsed, crushing Dawn and causing her to die after being rushed to hospital. Jean received £300,000 for compensation from the Kings for Dawn's death and left the village for Morocco. Terry followed her to the airport, but she left without him.

In January 2011, Jean received a phone call from Bob to tell her that Terry and Viv had tragically been killed instantly by a fire started by Nick Henshall (Michael McKell) and that she was to take T.J. on after their funerals, as he wasn't able to look after him as well as his twins, Cathy and Heath (Gabrielle and Sebastian Dowling). T.J. then went to live with Jean in Morocco.

== Ronnie Marsden ==
Ronnie Marsden
- Emmerdale character
- Portrayed by: Ray Ashcroft
- First appearance: 10 March 2003
- Last appearance: 3 December 2003
- Introduced by: Steve Frost
In-universe information
- Wife: Frances Marsden (1978-present)
- Sons: Paul Marsden; Alistair Marsden
- Daughters: Elaine Marsden

Ronnie Marsden, played by Ray Ashcroft, made his first appearance on 10 March 2003. Ashcroft previously appeared in the show in 1994 and 1995 as two separate policeman. His character was introduced as the head of the new Marsden family. Shortly after his arrival, Ronnie began an affair with Louise Appleton (Emily Symons). Ashcroft was surprised by the plot development and found it "pretty flattering" to be paired up with a younger actress. Ashcroft felt he had some similarities with Ronnie, explaining "In many ways I am Ronnie. He always has that twinkle in his eye and, like most red-blooded males, I'm a sucker for a pretty face, like him. He's a bit of a teenager pushing 50, and so am I. I've also had my moments. And I've been unfaithful."

== Frances Marsden ==
Frances Marsden
- Emmerdale character
- Portrayed by: Sandy Walsh
- First appearance: 10 March 2003
- Last appearance: 17 December 2003
- Introduced by: Steve Frost
In-universe information
- Husband: Ronnie Marsden (1978-present)
- Sons: Paul Marsden; Alistair Marsden
- Daughters: Elaine Marsden

Frances Marsden is the matriarch of the Marsden family who move into the house that was previously occupied by the Reynolds family. She first appeared on March 10 alongside her husband Ronnie Marsden (Ray Ashcroft) and their three children Paul (Matthew Booth), Alistair (Danny Tennant) and Elaine (Samantha McCarthy), as well as her daughter-in-law Siobhan Marsden (Abigail Fisher). Whilst in Emmerdale she had a very rocky relationship with her husband, which began after she announced that she had a cancer scare. She got a job at Eric Pollard (Chris Chittell)'s factory, where she befriended Lisa Dingle (Jane Cox). After a couple of months in the village, she organised a girls night out with Diane Sugden (Elizabeth Estensen), whom she had also recently befriended. This was when it was revealed that Ronnie had been having an affair with Louise Appleton (Emily Symons) after he lied to her saying that he was at a pub called The Malt Shovel. This lie fell through when Marlon Dingle (Mark Charnock) revealed that he was propping up the bar at The Woolpack. Frances then confronted Ronnie about his lying and he confessed to his affair with Louise, but ended it and worked hard to rebuild his marriage with Frances, which he managed to do before leaving the village.

== Alistair Marsden ==
Alistair Marsden
- Emmerdale character
- Portrayed by: Danny Tennant
- First appearance: 10 March 2003
- Last appearance: 17 December 2003
- Introduced by: Steve Frost
In-universe information
- Father: Ronnie Marsden
- Mother: Frances Marsden
- Brothers: Paul Marsden
- Sisters: Elaine Marsden

Alistair "Ali" Marsden is the younger son of Ronnie Marsden (Ray Ashcroft) and Frances Marsden (Sandy Walsh) as well as the brother of Paul Marsden (Matthew Booth) and twin brother of Elaine Marsden, who arrives in Emmerdale on March 10, along with his family, including his sister-in-law Siobhan Marsden (Abigail Fisher). Whilst in Emmerdale, he took a liking to Katie Addyman (Sammy Winward), which annoyed her boyfriend Andy Sugden (Kelvin Fletcher). He also lied about having a heart defect to try and gain sympathy from Ollie Reynolds (Vicky Binns) and Donna Windsor (Verity Rushworth), meaning that he was dying. He also faked his heart defect kicking in to gain attention. Furthermore, he spread some spiteful rumours about Stephen Butler being gay, causing him to leave the village. Ali moves to Hull with his mother when Frances decides to reconcile with Ronnie.

== Elaine Marsden ==
Elaine Marsden
- Emmerdale character
- Portrayed by: Samantha McCarthy
- First appearance: 10 March 2003
- Last appearance: 17 December 2003
- Introduced by: Steve Frost
In-universe information
- Father: Ronnie Marsden
- Mother: Frances Marsden
- Brothers: Paul Marsden; Alistair Marsden

Elaine Marsden is the daughter of Ronnie Marsden (Ray Ashcroft) and Frances Marsden (Sandy Walsh) and the younger sister of Paul Marsden (Matthew Booth) and twin of Alistair Marsden (Danny Tennant), who moved into Emmerdale with her family on March 10. Whilst in the village, she developed feelings for Robert Sugden (Karl Davies), but he was in a relationship with Donna Windsor (Verity Rushworth). After leaving school, she got a job at Eric Pollard (Chris Chittell)'s factory after losing her previous job. Whilst Donna went away, she and Robert grew closer and eventually began dating after he ended his relationship. The couple briefly split after he made an insensitive comment, but she forgave him and they resumed their relationship until Robert crashed his car into a tree, causing Elaine to be unconscious. As a result, Robert moved an unconscious Elaine into the driving seat, making her believe that she caused the accident as when she regained consciousness, she couldn't remember anything, but when a bruise from Robert's seat belt was discovered, he confessed and Elaine ended things for good. Furthermore, after telling her father, Ronnie attacked Robert. In December, Ronnie tried seducing Siobhan Marsden (Abigail Fisher), resulting in her smashing a bottle over his head. When Frances found out, she smashed up Holdgate Farm with an axe before throwing Ronnie out. She regrets her decision and follows him to Hull but Elaine refuses to go. When Paul and Siobhan refuse to let Elaine stay with them, she goes to live with a friend in Rotherham.

== Rachel Whatmore ==
Rachel Whatmore
- Emmerdale character
- Portrayed by: Zoe Lambert
- Duration: 2003–2005
- First appearance: 1 June 2003
- Last appearance: 6 May 2005
- Introduced by: Steve Frost
In-universe information
- Occupation: Lawyer

Rachel Whatmore is the solicitor for the Tate family. She appeared from 2003 to 2005.

Rachel is first seen when representing Chris Tate in his personal matters, as she helps him to dispose of most of his money and make sure his wife Charity Tate has nothing. Unknown to Rachel, Chris is dying and plans to commit suicide and frame Charity for his murder. Zoe has to run the Tate empire after her brother's death, and she becomes close to Rachel, especially after she learns Rachel, like her, is a lesbian. In early 2004, Zoe attempts to have a romantic relationship with Scott Windsor, the father of her child, but her feelings for Rachel lead to an affair. Scott's mother Viv Hope sees them and tells Scott, leading to a confrontation and Rachel ends the relationship. A year later, Zoe asks Rachel if they can try again, but Rachel is now in a new relationship.

In June 2005, Zoe faces charges for the attempted murder of Scott, but Rachel is on holiday, and her colleague Neil Depaul instead takes Zoe's case.

== Denzil Calburn ==
Denzil Calburn
- Emmerdale character
- Portrayed by: Danny Lawrence
- Duration: 2003–2005
- First appearance: 2 June 2003
- Last appearance: 22 September 2005
- Introduced by: Steve Frost
In-universe information
- Occupation: Police officer

Police Constable Denzil Calburn, played by Danny Lawrence, is a police officer. He appeared intermittently for two years from 2003 to 2005. Lawrence told The Manchester Evening News: "Originally I went in for a one-line reading. The character didn't even have a name when I read for the part. But I must have done something right because I won the role and they have asked me back on a number of occasions since." Of his cast mates, Lawrence said: "The cast of Emmerdale are great fun to work with and there is no hierarchy, not even with the older established stars on the show."Patsy Kensit is a lovely lady as well and the younger members of the cast are great fun too. I was also lucky enough to meet Stan Richards - Seth Armstrong - just before he died. He was a national institution and a great bloke."

Denzil first appears when he arrests Cain Dingle (Jeff Hordley) for physically assaulting his cousin Charity Tate (Emma Atkins). He later arrives when Jack Sugden (Clive Hornby) reports his land rover stolen but the matter is resolved when Jack's adoptive son, Andy Sugden (Kelvin Fletcher), knowing his half-brother Daz Eden (Luke Tittensor) has taken it, falsely tells Denzil that he had borrowed the car and Jack reluctantly corroborates Andy's story. However, the following day Daz is arrested when Rodney Blackstock (Patrick Mower) reports his car stolen. When Jack and Andy arrive at the station, Denzil tells them Daz is on a final warning as he has form for joyriding. He then reveals to Jack and Andy that Daz has been on a young offenders programme and will be appearing in court following this offence. A few months later, he questions the Dingle family over the theft of some whisky and investigates Jack Sugden's shooting and then is involved in the investigation of Paul Marsden's death. Denzil and his colleague tend to Zoe Tate (Leah Bracknell) when she has a schizophrenic episode.

In 2005, Denzil has a brief relationship with Chas Dingle after he offers to change a flat tyre for her when she breaks down on the side of the road. However, she later falls in love with Carl King. Denzil breaks up with Chas when she repeatedly lies for her lawbreaking father Shadrach Dingle (Andy Devine), who steals Denzil's patrol car, humiliating him. Denzil returns to give evidence at Zoe's trial for the attempted murder of Scott Windsor (Ben Freeman) in September.

== Bobby-John Downes ==
Bobby-John Downes
- Emmerdale character
- Portrayed by: Brian Hibbard
- Duration: 2003, 2006
- First appearance: 25 August 2003
- Last appearance: 12 May 2006
- Introduced by: Steve Frost (2003); Kathleen Beedles (2006)

Bobby-John Downes, played by Brian Hibbard, made his first appearance on 25 August 2003. In April 2006, it was announced that Hibbard would be returning to Emmerdale for a handful of episodes to aid the departure of Lesley Meredith (Sherrie Hewson). Hibbard described Bobby-John as "a ladies' man who is a bit long in the tooth." He added: " Viewers are going to see a whole different side to Bobby-John, as he tries to rekindle his love affair with his lost love Lesley. He still carries a torch for Lesley, and this is their chance to get it on. In the end, they disappear into the sunset in his camper van." A writer from Wales Online described Bobby-John as an "aging Romeo".

Bobby-John arrives in Emmerdale as the head of a group of travelers who arrive in the village to set up a fairground attraction over the bank holiday weekend. Rodney Blackstock (Patrick Mower) confronts Bobby-John about disturbing the peace and only to find that Eric Pollard (Christopher Chittell) has rented the land to the travelers. Bobby-John annoys Rodney further when he talks to his daughter, Nicola (Nicola Wheeler). Bobby-John and the travelers leave the village after several days. Three years later, Bobby-John returns and meets Lesley, who falls into the open Woolpack cellar. Bobby-John and Diane Sugden (Elizabeth Estensen) help Lesley out of the cellar and get her a drink. Bobby-John and Lesley reminisce about old times and Bobby-John asks Lesley out to make up for a date he stood her up on nearly forty years earlier but she rejects him. However, Lesley gives Bobby-John another chance they reunite. Lesley's son, Simon Meredith (Dale Meeks), takes a dislike to Bobby-John and when Simon learns that he has upset Lesley by flirting with Del Dingle (Hayley Tamaddon) and Val Lambert (Charlie Hardwick), he throws him out. Bobby-John, determined to win Lesley back, attempts to recreate the date they missed and is successful. The couple then go to an expensive hotel for a night but plans are cut short when Simon finds Kelly Windsor's (Adele Silva) credit card at the house. Simon races to hotel to and immediately blames Bobby-John but Lesley confesses, which results in Bobby-John leaving the hotel in disgust. Lesley tries to explain but Bobby-John refuses to listen. Simon then tries to smooth things over explaining about Lesley's financial situation. Following Lesley's confession to Kelly about the theft of the card, Bobby-John decides to leave but not before asking Lesley to leave with him, which she accepts. They then leave in Bobby-John's van.

== Eddie Hope ==
Eddie Hope
- Emmerdale character
- Portrayed by: Nigel Betts
- Duration: 2003, 2007
- First appearance: 4 September 2003
- Last appearance: 21 May 2007
- Introduced by: Steve Frost (2003); Kathleen Beedles (2007)
In-universe information
- Occupation: Salesman
- Brothers: Bob Hope
- Wife: Moira Hope
- Nephews: Jamie Hope; Josh Hope; Heath Hope
- Nieces: Dawn Woods; Carly Hope; Roxy Lockhart; Cathy Hope
- Other relatives: TJ Woods

Eddie Hope is the brother of Bob Hope. He appeared in 2003 and 2007.

Eddie first appears in Emmerdale in late 2003. He tries to romance Lisa Dingle, whose husband Zak is away in Chile, but she does remain loyal to her husband. He leaves the village on 26 November. Eddie returns in February 2007 when he is the new sales manager for Naughty Nylons. He offers Bob a job as a salesman, much to the annoyance of Bob's wife Viv. During his time in the village he tries to win Viv from Bob, but this fails. He leaves the village in May 2007.

== T.J. Woods ==
T.J. Woods
- Emmerdale character
- Portrayed by: Connor Lee
- Duration: 2003–2011
- First appearance: 19 October 2003
- Last appearance: 21 January 2011
- Introduced by: Steve Frost
In-universe information
- Father: Terry Woods
- Mother: Dawn Woods
- Half-brothers: Thomas Carter
- Grandfathers: Duke Woods; Bob Hope
- Grandmothers: Jean Hope
- Uncles: Jamie Hope; Josh Hope; Heath Hope
- Aunts: Carly Hope; Roxy Lockhart; Cathy Hope
- Other relatives: Eddie Hope

T.J. Woods is the son of Terry and Dawn Woods. He first appeared on his birth on 19 October 2003 and appeared intermittently for seven years until 21 January 2011.

T.J. is born in October 2003, and when he is a few days old, Terry has a stroke. With Dawn having to care for both Terry and T.J, her marriage with Terry comes under strain and they split up. In July 2006, after learning of Terry's relationship with her mother Jean Hope, Dawn decides to leave the village and move to Cornwall with T.J. Jean talks Terry out of launching a custody battle. However, before they can leave Emmerdale, Dawn is killed in the Kings River House explosion.

Jean accepts compensation for Dawn's death from the King family and decides to move to Morocco, and without Terry knowing decides to take T.J. with her. However, Jean's son Jamie Hope tells Terry and he rushes to the airport, but is too late to stop them departing. Terry then travels to Morocco and returns in January 2007 with T.J. but he's confused as to where Dawn has gone and Terry has to explain, and they release a balloon in her memory. In April 2008, T.J. contracts e.coli and is taken to hospital to recover. Later in 2008, T.J. becomes a more sarcastic child and is unhappy with Terry's relationship with Brenda Walker, but later accepts her.

In January 2011, Terry and Viv Hope were both killed in an arson attack. Dawn's dad and T.J.'s grandfather Bob Hope (Tony Audenshaw) who was married to Viv decides to send T.J. to Morocco with Jean permanently because he had his and Viv's twin children Cathy Hope and Heath Hope to look after. T.J. said before going he does not want to go as he thinks it is too hot in Morocco and that Moroccans wear "funny hats" but eventually went.

== Denise Eden ==
Denise Eden
- Emmerdale character
- Portrayed by: Andrina Carroll (2003); Lisa Parry (2006)
- Duration: 2003, 2006
- First appearance: 21 October 2003
- Last appearance: 23 August 2006
- Introduced by: Steve Frost (2003); Kathleen Beedles (2006)
In-universe information
- Sons: Daz Eden

Denise Eden, is the mother of Daz Eden (Luke Tittensor). She first appeared during the episode aired on 21 October 2003, played by Andrina Caroll. When the character returned in 2006, Lisa Parry took over the role.

Denise arrives in Emmerdale to collect Daz from Butler's farm where his half-brother Andy Sugden (Kelvin Fletcher) and his fiancée Katie Addyman (Sammy Winward) live. When Daz Andy's car crashes into Denise's, she is angry and orders him to get in the car and go home with her and they drive off. The following week, Denise returns after Andy contacts her following Daz attempting dig up Edna Birch's (Shirley Stelfox) dog's, Batley, grave. She is flippant about it and argues with Andy and Katie. When Daz is arrested for joyriding in Manchester, Denise refuses to collect him from the police station and Andy has to go. When Andy takes Daz back to Denise's, he sees how she treats Daz and he takes him back to the farm with him. The following day, Denise arrives to collect Daz but Andy tells her Daz is staying with him and Katie until Denise gets her act together. Denise then taunts Andy comparing him to his and Daz's father Billy Hopwood (David Crellin) and he tells her to leave.

Nearly three years later, Denise returns to the village wanting to see Daz, much to Andy's anger. However, Daz reluctantly gives her another chance after Denise tells him she has changed. Two weeks later, Daz calls Denise and tells her he wants to live with her and she comes to collect him and they leave. However, within two months, Daz returns having left Denise and her abusive boyfriend. Denise arrives demanding £500 to repair her boyfriend's car which Daz has damaged.

== Simon Meredith ==
Simon Meredith
- Emmerdale character
- Portrayed by: Dale Meeks
- Duration: 2003–2006
- First appearance: 20 November 2003
- Last appearance: 2 August 2006
- Introduced by: Steve Frost
In-universe information
- Occupation: Fishmonger; Businessman; Binman
- Father: Mick Meredith
- Mother: Lesley Meredith
- Sisters: Bonnie Meredith

Simon Meredith, portrayed by Dale Meeks, made his first screen appearance on 20 November 2003. Meeks' was initially contracted for three months but proved popular and his contract was extended by twelve months as a result. Prior to securing the role of Simon, Meeks had considered giving up acting after numerous failed auditions and the expenses of travelling from his native Newcastle to London. However, while in the capital he received a phone call from his agent. He told the Northern Echo: "I only had the clothes I was standing up in, and no money to go back home to get fresh ones. Fortunately, he said that Emmerdale would pay my expenses. But I said if I didn't get that job, then I would give up." At the audition, Twenty other actors were present. After reading the script, Meeks thought the producers wanted him to do a Yorkshire dialect but they told him to read in his natural Geordie accent. Simon's character outline was a love interest for Nicola Blackstock (Nicola Wheeler) but producers told Meeks little else. Meeks described Simon as an extension of himself. Meeks claimed that he was a fan prior to joining the serial and was pleased to be working alongside fellow Tyneside actors, Charlie Hardwick, John Middleton and Elizabeth Estensen. Meeks joked that he worried about there being a "Geordie overload".

In February 2006, it was reported that Meeks' character, Simon would be written out alongside his mother, Lesley Meredith (Sherrie Hewson). Meeks said "I'm so grateful to Emmerdale for giving me such a fantastic opportunity. Simon has been a great character to play. It's been an amazing two-and-a-half years. I've enjoyed every minute.” After leaving the serial, Meeks spoke to the BBC "It was the best time of my life. I think it was a popular character and people are saying 'When are you going back to Emmerdale?' – you never know," he said. "It was a great period of time, I still live in Leeds and I'm still in touch with a lot of the members of the cast. I still stand by it, I think of all the soaps on the telly it's got a brilliant blend."

Simon arrives in the village making a fish delivery to Cafe Hope. Nicola Blackstock asks her friend Emily Kirk (Kate McGregor) to arrange a date with Simon's colleague Kenny Wade (Victor Gardener) but Emily mistakenly invites Simon, much to Nicola's horror. Nicola is rude to Simon but he takes it in his stride and she storms off. In spite of this Simon continues to pursue Nicola and they eventually begin dating. When Nicola asks Syd Woolfe (Nathan Gladwell) to be her date for her school reunion, Simon is hurt when he overhears Nicola thanking Syd as he planned to propose. Nicola soon realises she has hurt Simon and publicly declares her love for him. Simon then proposes and Nicola accepts. Their happiness does not last for long. The reappearance of Simon's ex-fiancée Tash Abbott (Sally Evans) sets off the green eyed-monster in Nicola and the two women come to blows. Furious at Nicola's jealous behaviour, Simon flees to his mother Lesley's in Scarborough - followed by Nicola. Desperate not to lose him, Nicola launches an impassioned speech and Simon finally accepts she properly loves him. The couple get re-engaged and buy Mulberry Cottage in Emmerdale and it looks like they are set for a happy beginning to their marriage.

However, unbeknown to Simon, Lesley has run their business into the ground and in a matter of weeks, they lose everything. When Nicola asks her father Rodney Blackstock (Patrick Mower) for some money to bail them out and Simon is horrified and it remains a bone of contention between the couple as Nicola cannot live without money and Simon's meager wages from working as a binman are barely enough to stay afloat. Their lodger Ivan Jones (Daniel Brocklebank), who is dating Nicola's half-brother Paul Lambert (Mathew Bose) finds himself in the middle of their rows. Nicola tries to seduce Ivan but is caught by Lesley and when it is revealed, it causes ructions and Simon disowns both Nicola and Ivan. Nicola soon leaves but Simon and Ivan get their friendship back on track. Following Lesley's departure with old flame Bobby-John Downes (Brian Hibbard), and Simon making a clumsy pass at Diane Sugden (Estensen), he and Ivan become dissatisfied with life in the village and decide to leave for Costa Rica on 2 August 2006.

== Ethan Blake ==
Ethan Blake
- Emmerdale character
- Portrayed by: Liam O'Brien
- Duration: 2003–2006
- First appearance: 17 December 2003
- Last appearance: 20 October 2006
- Introduced by: Steve Frost (2003); Kathleen Beedles (2006)
In-universe information
- Occupation: Curate

Ethan Blake is a curate at Emmerdale's church working alongside vicar Ashley Thomas. Debbie Dingle tries to seduce him but he rebuffs her advances. In October 2004, Cain discovers Debbie has been seeing someone and when Debbie lies that she went to the church, Cain gets the wrong idea and beats up Ethan, believing that he has been sleeping with Debbie. Ashley is disappointed and angry when Ethan confesses he kissed Debbie (when he was actually thinking of Niamh, not Debbie) and is worried when Ethan receives a death threat from Cain. Cain then destroys Ethan's car and attacks Ethan again. Zak and Ashley restrain Cain long enough for Debbie to swear on Noah's life that Ethan never touched her. Cain then leaves Ethan alone, with a badly bruised and bleeding face. Ethan then calls Niamh as he needs a friend. Ethan conducts the funeral of vet and a good friend of the village Max King in October 2005 while Ashley goes to Israel for three weeks.

Ethan later leaves the village in disgrace after he tries to break up Ashley and his wife Laurel Potts' relationship. He returns a year later with Emily Kirk but does not stay long due to the previous unpleasantness with Ashley, as Ethan leaves the village for Dublin.

== Gordon Livesy ==
Gordon Livesy
- Emmerdale character
- Portrayed by: Gerard Fletcher (2003–2008); Gary Mavers (2015–2016)
- Duration: 2003–2004, 2006, 2008, 2015–2016
- First appearance: 2 December 2003
- Last appearance: 11 May 2016
- Introduced by: Steve Frost (2003–2004); Kathleen Beedles (2006); Anita Turner (2008); Kate Oates (2015)
In-universe information
- Wife: Chas Dingle (backstory, 1991–2001); Sandra Livesy (2002–2009)
- Sons: Aaron Dingle
- Daughters: Liv Flaherty

Gordon Livesy, played by Gerard Fletcher, made his first screen appearance on 2 December 2003. In November 2015, it was announced that the character would return the following month, with Gary Mavers taking over the role. Daniel Kilkelly of Digital Spy reported that Gordon's return would allow the show "to delve back into the past of Chas and Aaron, with a busy few months ahead for both of them." In 2016, Gordon become involved in a child abuse storyline after it is revealed that Gordon sexually abused Aaron when he was a child. Gordon departed on 11 May 2016 after he received his sentence.

Gordon is the former husband of Chas Dingle (Lucy Pargeter) and the father of Aaron Livesy (Danny Webb/Danny Miller) and Liv Flaherty (Isobel Steele). Gordon (Gerard Fletcher) visits Emmerdale when he drops off Aaron (Webb) to spend time with Chas. When Louise Appleton (Emily Symons) tells him that she saw Chas hit Aaron, Gordon is angry and takes Aaron home, telling Chas that in future she will only see him if it is what Aaron wants. Gordon later appears when Aaron (now played by Miller) is arrested after becoming a drug mule for the McFarlanes, a local crime family. Chas goes to the police station and later visits Gordon to find out what had been going on. Gordon tells her that he had thrown Aaron out after he hit his wife Sandra (Janet Bamford), with whom he has a child. Aaron later asks to go back to his father's, but Gordon says they need a break from him and insists he stay with Chas. Later that night, Aaron vandalises Gordon's office, although Gordon cannot prove it.

Seven years later, Gordon (now played by Gary Mavers) meets Diane Sugden (Elizabeth Estensen) in an oncologists waiting room. He reveals that to her that he has regrets about being estranged from Aaron, but asks Diane not to tell anyone that she saw him. Gordon later visits Chas and Aaron. He and Chas reconnect and begin dating again, which upsets Aaron when he sees them together. Aaron tells his ex-lover Robert Sugden (Ryan Hawley) that Gordon is the real reason why he self-harms but refuses to explain why. The next day, Aaron runs away from hospital and Robert tracks him down. Aaron tells Robert that Gordon raped him when he was 8 years old.

The following day, Robert comes face to face with Gordon and confronts him about what he did to Aaron when he was a child. Gordon denies it and Robert warns Gordon, telling him to leave town or he will finish him off. When Aaron is being prepared for discharge, Robert tells him he could be affected by false memory syndrome after being convinced by Gordon that Aaron has made the whole thing up but Aaron tells Robert that he is not lying. Aaron is horrified and he confronts Gordon about his twisted lies. Gordon later leaves after being accused of child abuse towards Aaron.

In February 2016, after a day at the seaside, Aaron admits to Chas that Gordon raped him and tells her the details of his rape. Chas then goes over to Gordon's house in order to confront him. Gordon lies and tells her that he did not rape Aaron but the truth comes out. Chas later tells her half-brother Cain Dingle (Jeff Hordley) about Gordon raping Aaron. Cain leaves and plans to get revenge on Gordon.

The next day, Gordon returns from shopping to find somebody has broken into his house and has wrecked it. Cain then walks in and knocks him out because of what he did to Aaron, tying him up in the process. When Gordon awakes Cain is preparing to drug him. Gordon still denies raping Aaron. As Cain is about to drug him, Aaron and Chas walk in and Aaron stops Cain from killing Gordon as he does not wish for Cain to be charged with murder. Aaron says he will report Gordon to police for what he did to him. Gordon is then reported to the police and taken in for questioning, but he tells the police about Cain attempting to force him take his own life, so the police then question Cain. Cain's wife Moira Dingle (Natalie J. Robb) and Chas both cover for him and tell the police that Cain was with them all night.

The next day, Aaron goes to the scrapyard to find that Gordon is in the office waiting for him. Gordon threatens Aaron and tells him that if he does not recant his statement, then he will find a way to make sure Cain is locked up for threatening him.

2 weeks later, Chas vandalises Gordon's car, sprays 'Paedo' on the car and shouts at neighbours accusations of Gordons activities. Robert arrives and drags Chas away. Chas then received a warning by DS Wise (Neil Roberts). Aaron arrived and was furious at what his mother had done. When Chas arrived at the police station, Aaron told her to tell the officers that Gordon is innocent or he will walk away from her. However Chas reveals the situation to Diane, Doug Potts (Duncan Preston), James (Bill Ward), Emma (Gillian Kearney) and Finn Barton (Joe Gill), telling them that Gordon abused Aaron. This left Aaron upset and furious at Chas for revealing his secret to the public and told her to stay away from him.

Three days later, another male victim came forward to the police and says Gordon abused him but later, revealed Robert paid Gordon's neighbour Ryan Harred (George Sampson) to lie to the police to get Gordon charged. Gordon went to the pub to see Chas, believing she paid Ryan to lie to the police but he had no idea it was Robert. Gordon pinned Chas against a wall and threatened her. Chas' cousin Marlon Dingle (Mark Charnock) walked in and grabbed Gordon separating him from Chas before the police arrived taking Gordon away. Later, Robert admits to Chas, he was the person who paid Ryan. Two days later, Aaron learns about Robert’s deal with Ryan, Aaron warns Robert, if the case falls apart, he will blame him. The next day, Aaron visits Ryan and tells him to drop his statement and to keep the money that Robert gave him. Then Aaron visits Gordon who tells Aaron that he's blown the case, insisting that he'll inform the police about his lying before closing the door on him. Aaron returns and learns the police had charged Gordon.

In March 2016, in his plea hearing, Gordon pretended to be struggling to walk, and collapsed, explaining it was the side effects of his chemotherapy. Gordon pleaded not guilty and he was released on bail once again. Gordon requested to be escorted from the court. The following day, Gordon's daughter, Liv, visited him. Liv questioned him about Aaron's allegations, but Gordon protested his innocence and gave Liv his mother's necklace. Liv later ran out of Gordon's house and into Aaron, and apologised to her brother. The following day, Liv and Gordon met up and Liv informed him that her mother had made a statement to the police.

In April 2016, Liv meet up with Gordon when Gordon tells Liv about Aaron's involvement of warehouse robbery nearly 5 months ago and he believe Aaron pay Ryan to lie to the police. The next day, when Liv and Gordon meet up, Liv told him she don't wanted to help him that results Gordon telling Liv get out of the cat before drive off. Later, Aaron found out Liv had been spying on him for Gordon, Aaron went to Gordon's house when he confronts him about Liv. Gordon turns it round on him and tells Aaron he is the one who doesn't deserve to know Liv but Aaron stand up to Gordon. Aaron tells Gordon he'll see him in court before walks away. During court Gordon tries to blame it on Aaron by saying he just wanted to break up him and Chas. However he is later found guilty of rape and sentenced to 18 years imprisonment. The next day, Aaron gets a visit from DS Wise, who tells him and Liv that Gordon has died after committing suicide in prison by hanging.

== Other characters ==
Character	Episode date(s)	Actor	Circumstances
Mavis Cathcart	10 January - 25 August	Jacqueline Pilton	A woman who owned a cleaning business and a friend of Pearl Ladderbanks (Meg Johnson), who sold her company to Nicola Blackstock (Nicola Wheeler).
Stephen Butler	10 January - 21 May	William Snape	The son of Wilf Butler (Peter Armitage), who was close to bankruptcy when they struggled to accumulate money to pay the rent for their home Butler's Farm, which was owned by the Home Farm Estate. However, Jack Sugden (Clive Hornby) paid the unpaid rent, costing him his job. Alistair Marsden (Danny Tennant) began spreading malicious rumours that Stephen was gay, infuriating his girlfriend Donna Windsor (Verity Rushworth), who began to spread them even further as she believed them. Stephen's friend Andy Sugden (Kelvin Fletcher) also believed those rumours. As a result, Stephen had it out with Andy and subsequently left the village.
Wilf Butler	10 January - 12 May	Peter Armitage	The tenant of Butler's Farm where he lived with his son Stephen Butler (William Snape) and had done for many years before nearly becoming bankrupt. As he and Stephen struggled to pay off the rent, Jack Sugden (Clive Hornby) helped them by paying off their unpaid rent, costing him his job. Eventually, Wilf handed tenancy to Jack's adoptive son Andy Sugden (Kelvin Fletcher).
Lila Griffith	25 February – 4 March	Liz Stooke	A social worker who deals with Jean Tate's (Megan Pearson) adoption.
