= Siobhan Marsden =

Fictional character from Emmerdale

- Emmerdale character
- Portrayed by: Abigail Fisher
- Duration: 2003–2004
- First appearance: 10 March 2003
- Last appearance: 7 September 2004
- Created by: Steve Frost
In-universe information
- Occupation: Nurse
- Husband: Paul Marsden (2003–2004)

Siobhan Marsden is a fictional character from the British soap opera Emmerdale, played by Abigail Fisher. The character made her first on-screen appearance during the episode broadcast on 10 March 2003. Siobhan is introduced as part of a new family, the Marsdens. Siobhan is characterised as an able nurse who finds living in a small village difficult due to her city girl status. Her storylines as centric to her marriage to Paul Marsden (Matthew Booth). The remainder of the Marsden family were written out the show in their first year on-screen. Siobhan and Paul continued to appear and writers further developed their marriage. Siobhan is featured in a pregnancy storyline in which she has an abortion. Paul is later killed off and Siobhan tries to adjust to life as a widow. The character was written out of Emmerdale the following year and Fisher made her final appearance as Siobhan during the episode broadcast on 7 September 2004.

== Development ==
On 15 February 2003, Fisher's casting and the character details were publicised via a report in Inside Soap. Siobhan was introduced in March 2003 alongside the Marsden family. The family consisted of Siobhan and her husband Paul Marsden (Matthew Booth), his parents Ronnie Marsden (Ray Ashcroft) and Frances Marsden (Sandy Walsh) and his siblings Elaine Marsden (Samantha McCarthy) and Ali Marsden (Danny Tennant). Siobhan works as a district nurse in the nearby town of Hotten. Booth told Joanne Tebbutt from All About Soap that the Marsden family are "quite a normal bunch, a little disjointed and crazy at times, but that's what keeps them interesting." The Marsden family decide to move to Emmerdale village to help his father's job as a truck driver. They used to reside in Hotten, but Ronnie could not find places to park his truck. The family also believe that transitioning to the healthier country lifestyle will help Ali, who has a heart condition. Booth stated that Siobhan finds it difficult to settle into village life because she is a "city girl". She ultimately sacrifices her own happiness to appease Paul, who is unhappy working as a hospital porter in Hotten. Siobhan is an "able" nurse who is also "self-assured" and "quick-tempered".

Booth described Paul as being "under the thumb" of Siobhan because he has an "easy-going" and "laid-back" persona. He added that Siobhan "spices him up" and in turn his "calming manner controls her wild ways". Booth described Siobhan and Paul's personalities as being completely different which portrays to viewers that they may be incompatible. Despite this, they share genuine love and "compliment each other really well". Siobhan and Paul married when they were twenty-two while on holiday in America. Both told Tebbutt that they "married in a white chapel in Reno after too much cheap booze." Siobhan and Paul's holiday wedding annoys his mother Frances and creates tension between them. Booth explained that Frances dislikes Siobhan because "she's a bit wild. She likes going out with her mates and staying out till all hours, whereas Paul is quite a homely chap." Both also revealed that it is not Siobhan's fault Frances dislikes her but rather no one "is good enough for her little boy!" Ashcroft told Allison Maund from Inside Soap that Siobhan and Ronnie are "very close" and have a better relationship than Siobhan has with Frances.

In September 2003, the serial's producer Steve Frost announced that he would be writing out the majority of the family. Frost told an Evening Standard journalist that "the Marsdens have got a great story to play through the autumn, but unfortunately this culminates in them leaving the village." However, he confirmed that Siobhan and her on-screen husband Paul would remain in the series. Frost told a reporter from Inside Soap that "Paul and Siobhan Marsden will be staying and facing some trying times".

Writers originally portrayed Siobhan and Paul as having a happy marriage but altered this via a pregnancy storyline. When Siobhan becomes pregnant, she and Paul agree that she should have an abortion. Writers developed the story with Siobhan struggling with their decision and Paul's attitude towards her decision to work whilst pregnant leaves her confused. Paul later changes his mind and want to keep the baby, but Siobhan does not. She confides in Louise Appleton (Emily Symons) that she intends to fake a miscarriage. Siobhan has a termination but lies to Paul that she is still pregnant and decided against terminating her pregnancy. Fisher believed that Siobhan could regret having a termination in her future, but she "genuinely believes" it is the best option. Fisher told Sally Brockway from Soaplife that "they've just brought the cottage, they're hard up and she wants them to spend time together before they're saddled with kids."

Fisher told Brockway that Siobhan was "typical of today's career women" who chose not to wait until their thirties to begin a family. She believed the story would get the public debating about women's pregnancies and work life choices. She thought it would divide viewers who would side with either Siobhan or Paul. Fisher was glad to play the storyline because it made her character centric to the show's plot. She added "it's certainly going to put their relationship in the spotlight and viewers will be able to see what makes these two tick. But I hope they do because I think they could be a really interesting couple."

In her final storyline, Siobhan is portrayed reeling from Paul's death. She decides to leave the village and Matthew King (Matt Healy) concocts a scheme to evict her quicker. Siobhan discovers that she might be pregnant again and reconsiders. She asks Matthew if she can rent her home. Matthew feels guilty over his treatment of Siobhan and offers her a her a financial agreement to relocate her.

== Storylines ==
After arriving in town, Siobhan soon found a job as a nurse, although she repeatedly clashed with locals, most notably when Victoria Sugden (Hannah Midgley) faked an illness. When Victoria actually became sick, Siobhan didn't believe her, causing a clash with Jack Sugden (Clive Hornby). When Paul's family left the village in December 2003, the couple moved into Victoria Cottage.

In July 2004, married life ended in a horrific manner. Siobhan's husband, Paul went to fix the gutters on a roof with Carl King (Tom Lister). Carl playfully tossed him some tools, but when Paul tried to catch them, he fell to his death. Carl and Paul had only recently made up after a fight, and Carl was terrified people would think he'd deliberately killed Paul. Carl called his brothers Jimmy King (Nick Miles) and Matthew King (Matt Healy) and they moved Paul's body to his garden. After returning home from the pub with best mate Chloe Atkinson (Amy Nuttall), Siobhan found Paul's body, cradling him in her arms. Siobhan had no desire to stay in the village, and Matthew, happy to get rid of her as soon as possible, bought Victoria Cottage. Days before her departure, Siobhan learned she was pregnant—a bittersweet irony, as Paul had wanted nothing more than to be a father. Siobhan considered staying in the village, but Matthew refused to let her rent. She left a few days later, never knowing the true circumstances of her husband's death.

== Reception ==
Lorna Cooper of MSN TV listed Siobhan of one of Soap Opera's "forgotten characters" and noted that during her time in the serial she managed to clash with all of the locals. Justine O'Mahony from the Enniscorthy Guardian was not impressed with Siobhan's pregnancy storyline and abortion lie. She branded it "sick" and "even sicker" when Siobhan celebrates her pregnancy following the abortion. Mahony, now writing for Wexford People branded her "the awful Siobhan" for feigning a miscarriage. Soaplife's Sally Brockway believed that writers originally never fully developed Siobhan and Paul until the pregnancy storyline. She added that Siobhan was a district nurse and with Paul, they "seem a nice enough couple" - but that was all writers bothered to portray to viewers. A writer from Inside Soap praised Emmerdale for its success in introducing the Marsden family. They noted that new families introduced into soap often fail. They believed the show managed to succeed with the Marsden's who fitted "effortlessly into the show", adding "they're all great".
