= Scott Windsor =

Fictional character from Emmerdale

- Emmerdale character
- Ben Freeman as Scott Windsor (2006)
- Portrayed by: Toby Cockerell (1993–1996); Ben Freeman (1998–2007)
- Duration: 1993–1996, 1998–2007
- First appearance: 10 August 1993
- Last appearance: 14 January 2007
- Introduced by: Nicholas Prosser (1993); Kieran Roberts (1998)
- Toby Cockerell as Scott Windsor (1996)
In-universe information
- Occupation: Soldier; Mechanic
- Father: Reg Dawson
- Mother: Viv Hope
- Adoptive father: Vic Windsor
- Stepfather: Bob Hope
- Sisters: Kelly Windsor (adoptive)
- Half-brothers: Heath Hope
- Half-sisters: Donna Windsor; Cathy Hope
- Daughters: Jean Tate
- Aunts: Lucy
- Nephews: Elliot Windsor (adoptive)
- Nieces: April Windsor

Scott Windsor (also Dawson) is a fictional character from the British ITV soap opera Emmerdale. From 1993 to 1996, Scott was played by Toby Cockerell. In 1996, Scott left the village to join the army and when he returned in 1998, Ben Freeman took over the role and played Scott until early 2007.

== Creation and Development ==
=== Casting ===
In 1993 series producer Nicholas Prosser introduced Scott as part of the new Windsor family. Among them were Scott's mother, Viv Windsor (Deena Payne), Viv's husband, Vic Windsor (Alun Lewis), Vic's daughter and Scott's adoptive sister, Kelly (Adele Silva), and Scott and Kelly's half-sister, Donna Windsor (Sophie Jeffery). In 1998 producer Mervyn Watson recast the role to Ben Freeman.

=== Departure ===
In early 2007, Scott Windsor was written out due to the court case of Freeman's rape allegations. Freeman was expected to return but it had not been confirmed if he would return to the show, he had been absent since January 2007. On 16 December 2007 Digital Spy confirmed that Ben Freeman had been axed from Emmerdale. However, the ITV website claims that Freeman had simply not renewed his contract, for practical reasons. His contract was due to expire at the end of 2007. In October 2008, Freeman was cleared of rape charges, and reports surfaced that he might return to the role of Scott. However, in June 2009 Freeman announced he would not be returning to the soap.

== Storylines ==
=== 1993–1996 ===
Scott is the son of Viv and Reg Dawson (Niven Boyd). Reg deserted them when Scott was young and Viv married Vic Windsor, who adopted Scott. Scott has a half-sister, Donna, and a stepsister, Kelly. The family move to the village in 1993. Reg follows them to the village and takes Viv and Shirley Turner (Rachael Davies) hostage at gunpoint, accidentally killing Shirley before being shot dead by a police marksman. Scott falls in with a bad crowd who force him to steal from the post office and threaten his sisters. Vic finds out about the theft and declares that Scott is 'no son of his', and Scott leaves to join the army.

=== 1998–2007 ===
Two years later Scott returns, having been discharged from the army for 'psychiatric reasons', but it is eventually revealed this was because he was having an affair with a high-ranking officer's wife. Scott and Kelly become closer and develop romantic feelings for each other. They share their first kiss on Christmas Day 1998, just as Vic is being murdered by Billy Hopwood (David Crellin) in the post office. Scott claims to be in love with Kelly and in 1999, as she prepares to marry Roy Glover (Nicky Evans), they begin sleeping together. The stress of their affair takes its toll on Kelly and after discovering she is pregnant, Kelly attempts to commit suicide, leaving letters that told the truth about what they’d done. Scott burns them but the truth is revealed by Donna who announces it in the pub and Kelly leaves for London soon afterwards.

With Kelly gone, Scott tries to resume a normal life and begins dating newcomer Chloe Atkinson (Amy Nuttall). They move in together and, when their housemate Jason Kirk leaves, they are joined by builder Syd Woolfe (Nathan Gladwell). One night, Scott drives Zoe Tate (Leah Bracknell) home and, in the grip of schizophrenia, they have a one-night stand. This results in Zoe having baby Jean (Megan Pearson), whose paternity remains a mystery for months as Zoe cannot remember how she got pregnant. Scott does not tell anyone that he is the father and is horrified when Chloe becomes Jean's nanny. He tells Zoe that he is Jean's father when she is seriously injured in hospital and they are horrified to learn that Jean was injured because Chloe hadn't strapped Jean into her baby seat properly before sleeping with Syd. Zoe's brother Chris (Peter Amory) furiously evicts them from Pear Tree Cottage and assumes that Scott raped Zoe as she is a lesbian. When the police decide not to press charges, Chris launches a hate campaign against Scott, burning down the garage and having him beaten up before paying a stripper, Yolanda Howie (Charlotte Faber-Scott), to sleep with Scott and accuse him of rape. When Zoe discovers what Chris has done, she pays Yolanda to drop the charges if Scott signs away his rights to baby Jean. Scott also dumps Chloe, unable to forgive her for cheating on him with Syd.

When Chris commits suicide, Scott is delighted and is one of the few people who believes his wife Charity (Emma Atkins) is innocent – up to the point where he supports her story that Chris has framed her for his 'murder'. With Chris gone, Scott and Zoe get closer and begin raising Jean together. With Scott now working at Home Farm, Zoe begins relying on him more and more and in her loneliness, vulnerability, and her feelings that Jean should have a mother and father to help raise her, ends up kissing him. Although they try to have a romantic relationship, Zoe is obviously not attracted to Scott and ends it. Scott becomes closer to his new stepsister Dawn Woods (Julia Mallam) who leaves her husband, stroke victim Terry (Billy Hartman), for Scott. When convicted rapist Frank Bernard Hartbourne (Rob Parry), Pearl Ladderbanks's (Meg Johnson) son arrives in the village, Scott, due to a misunderstanding involving Donna, attacks Frank, and beats him up badly. Facing an assault charge, Scott forces Dawn to lie for him – only to get his comeuppance a few days later when she retracts her statement. Scott later receives a twelve-month suspended sentence.

Scott and Dawn reconcile after a short split but Scott is not in love with her and when he learns that Zoe is planning to emigrate and take Jean with her, Scott reacts badly. He is delighted when Zoe asks him to go with them and be there for Jean, and thinks nothing of leaving Dawn but Zoe soon realises that Scott and Viv are plotting to stop them leaving. In revenge, she plots to make Scott think she is in love with him and he believes her, even proposing marriage but she refuses, claiming she would 'rather stick needles in her eyes'. Scott, enraged, attacks Zoe and she stabs him with a syringe full of Ketamine in self-defence and stabs him a second time while he is unconscious. Paddy Kirk (Dominic Brunt) catches Zoe about to complete injecting Scott again and stops her but Scott is left fighting for his life. He makes a full recovery and is determined to get revenge, relishing the chance to take her to court for attempted murder. However, his bullying of Paddy, the only witness, causes the case to collapse and Zoe is acquitted.

Incensed, Scott takes Zoe, her nephew Joseph (Oliver Young) and employee Callum Rennie (Andrew Whipp) hostage at gunpoint and threatens to kill them all, including Jean. Viv arrives and tries to talk Scott round, reminding him of what happened to Reg a decade before and Vic's death. Scott relents and releases the hostages. He later attacks Paddy and accidentally hits Dawn while she and Marlon Dingle (Mark Charnock) try to restrain him. Scott is arrested and sentenced to four months imprisonment. Kelly is the only family member to attend court with him. Scott only serves half his sentence, due to good behaviour. After being paroled, Scott is horrified to discover Dawn has now moved on and is dating Danny Daggert (Cleveland Campbell). Scott schemes to split them up. It works briefly but Dawn does not want Scott back and insists he moves out or she will report him to the police for punching Danny. Scott is forced to back down and vows to avenge himself. After learning Dawn has been doing various odd jobs to keep afloat, Scott reports her for benefit fraud and Dawn is arrested and consequently jailed for six weeks. Everyone, including Viv, is horrified by his behaviour. Scott is then evicted and continues his crusade against Dawn. Dawn dies in a house explosion in July 2006 and Scott feels guilty for his shabby treatment of her and blames Dawn's brother, Jamie Hope (Alex Carter) for not doing more to save her.

Scott begins a relationship with his teen apprentice, Debbie Dingle (Charley Webb). The pair con Rodney Blackstock (Patrick Mower) and in revenge Rodney gets them to work on a car for a friend of his but refuses to pay them. Scott and Debbie confront Rodney in the pub and an angry Scott demands their money, but Len Reynolds (Peter Martin) intervenes and the couple leave humiliated. This is Scott's last appearance. Following this, Scott leaves the village to stay with an old army friend down in London selling stolen cars, leaving the garage in Debbie's hands. On 4 January 2008, Scott phones Viv and tells her that he will not be returning and is putting Tug Ghyll up for sale.
