= Dawn Woods =

Fictional character from Emmerdale

- Emmerdale character
- Portrayed by: Julia Mallam
- Duration: 2003–2006
- First appearance: 16 February 2003
- Last appearance: 14 July 2006
- Introduced by: Steve Frost
In-universe information
- Father: Bob Hope
- Mother: Jean Hope
- Stepmother: Viv Hope
- Brothers: Jamie Hope
- Half-brothers: Josh Hope; Heath Hope
- Half-sisters: Carly Hope; Roxy Lockhart; Cathy Hope
- Husband: Terry Woods (2003–2004)
- Sons: T.J. Woods
- Uncles: Eddie Hope
- Nephews: Billy Hope

Dawn Hope (also Woods) is a fictional character from the British ITV soap opera Emmerdale, played by Julia Mallam. She made her first screen appearance during the episode broadcast on 16 February 2003 and her last on 14 July 2006.

== Storylines ==
Dawn arrives in Emmerdale as the fiancée of Terry Woods (Billy Hartman) who he had met on holiday in Spain. It was revealed that she is Bob Hope's (Tony Audenshaw) daughter but she had not seen much of him since he left her, her mother Jean Hope (Susan Penhaligon), and brother, Jamie Hope (Alex Carter), when she was four years old. Bob was against the idea of Dawn marrying Terry because of the 27-year age gap, but she married him anyway in March 2003. They have a son named T.J. Woods (Connor Lee). Dawn and Terry split up after he suffers a stroke just after T.J is born. Unable to cope with a newborn baby and an ill husband at such a young age, Dawn ended their marriage.

When Dawn's mother Jean arrives from Spain to support her following their break-up, she falls for Terry and is jealous of Dawn. She makes a pass at him but he rejects her, so Jean persuades Dawn to get sole custody of TJ. Although Terry appeals for joint custody, the court rules that Dawn should have sole custody as they could not force her to have joint custody as it was not what she wanted to live with. Dawn argues that due to the effects of his stroke, Terry often got tired and was a possible risk to T.J so she applies for sole custody just to be on the safe side.

Dawn then begins a relationship with Scott Windsor (Ben Freeman). They start seeing each other just before she divorces Terry and the only person Dawn tells is Bob, who disapproves due to him being married to Scott's mother Viv Hope (Deena Payne). Scott and Dawn move in together but Dawn is devastated and angry when Scott leaves her to flee to America with Zoe Tate (Leah Bracknell), the mother of his daughter, Jean Tate (Megan Pearson). Scott had kept it a secret from everyone and sends Dawn a letter in the post explaining that as she was his step-sister, and if their relationship went further, people would think it was weird, and he had "convinced" himself not to love her, and he was leaving with Zoe to be with his daughter in America, not wanting stay with her and TJ while Zoe left with Jean. Dawn then goes to Spain to stay with her mother because she could not bear to see Scott and Zoe. Dawn ignores Bob's telephone calls, unaware that he is contacting her to inform her that Scott was in critical condition in hospital after being injected with ketamine after attempting to rape Zoe. Viv's daughter Donna Windsor (Verity Rushworth) finally manages to get through to Bob in hospital, and he tells her about Dawn's letter from Scott. The letter was then discovered by Viv, and Dawn flies back from Spain just in time for Scott to wake up. Although Dawn initially forgives him, when Paddy Kirk (Dominic Brunt) drops out as a witness against Zoe at her trial, Dawn discovers that Scott had been blackmailing and threatening Paddy, and as a result Zoe is found not guilty of attempted murder. Scott then attacks Paddy and while Dawn and Marlon Dingle (Mark Charnock) try to break up the fight, he punches her by mistake. A shaken Dawn locks herself in her house with T.J and calls the police. Scott is arrested for assault, and he tries to claim he was provoked by Paddy but is shocked to discover that the assault charges were for hurting Dawn. Dawn has seen Scott's true colours, and finally realizes he is capable of what Zoe claimed he had done, and Dawn ends their relationship for good as she is scared he would rape her. While Scott serves a prison sentence for the assault, Dawn dates Danny Daggert (Cleveland Campbell), but breaks up with him after she realizes she isn't ready to settle down. After his release, Scott takes revenge on Dawn for rejecting him by reporting her for benefit fraud. Dawn had been taking odd jobs to better support T.J and is officially charged and serves three weeks of a six-week prison sentence.

Discovering, on her release from prison, that Terry and her mother were now in a relationship, Dawn demands they end things. They refuse and Dawn reminds Terry that her mother had dripped poison in her ear during the custody battle, and that neither of them had a right to T.J as she had sole custody. Dawn bans both Terry and her mother from seeing T.J and takes him to Cornwall on holiday. On her return, she reveals to her family that she had met a new boyfriend in Cornwall and planned to take T.J and move there. Terry begs her not to go but she refuses to listen. She allows Terry to take T.J out for the day on 13 July 2006, the day she is due to leave, so she could pack her and T.J's belongings but Terry is late returning him, meaning she and T.J miss their flight. Wanting something to do, Dawn goes with Marlon and his wife Donna, to view their new house, the King's River Showhome. Sadie King (Patsy Kensit) had sabotaged the building, and when the boiler room door is opened, the house explodes. Dawn is the first to be pulled out of the wreckage, alive. She is taken by ambulance to hospital accompanied by Bob, and is treated by a paramedic, Peter English, who had treated Terry when he had his stroke. Dawn appeared fine and her injuries seemed relatively minor and the doctors prepared to keep her for observation and release her. Bob goes to get a coffee for her, and returns to see Dawn getting wheeled past him by medical staff to the Emergency theatre. Peter then tells him that Dawn had died. Bob doesn't believe it at first due to her seemingly being fine, and Peter tells him that Dawn had gone into cardiac arrest and her death had been due to her suffering internal injuries and severe burns.

Since Dawn's death, Bob has often mentioned her, particularly when he or other characters experience bereavement. Emmerdale revisited Dawn's death in 2021 when Sadie's then husband Jimmy King (Nick Miles) admitted to Bob his family's role in the show home collapse, Jimmy had recently accidentally killed Paul Ashdale (Reece Dinsdale) and was experiencing severe guilt. After Bob and Viv's son Heath Hope (Sebastian Dowling) was killed in a car accident in 2024, Bob revealed to Dr Liam Cavanagh (Jonny McPherson) that losing Heath was harder for him than losing Dawn.

== Reception ==
Stefania Sarrubba from Radio Times called Dawn and Terry "one of the village's couples that raised eyebrows back in the early 2000s" and wrote that tragedy was "on the cards for both of them". The explosion that killed Dawn won "Spectacular Scene of the Year" at the 2007 British Soap Awards. Emma Wilson from the Daily Mirror noted how Dawn's relationship with Terry caused controversy due to the 27 year age gap, and also called Dawn's affair with Scott "illicit" and "ill-fated".
