= Jamie Hope (disambiguation) =

Jamie Hope may refer to:

- Jamie Hope (musician), Australian musician, bassist for I Killed the Prom Queen and former vocalist of The Red Shore
- Jamie Hope (Emmerdale), fictional character in Emmerdale
