= Gennie Walker =

Fictional character from Emmerdale

- Emmerdale character
- Portrayed by: Sian Reese-Williams
- Duration: 2008–2013
- First appearance: 1 April 2008
- Last appearance: 26 July 2013
- Introduced by: Kathleen Beedles
In-universe information
- Occupation: Hairdresser; Factory worker; Personal assistant
- Father: Shadrach Dingle
- Mother: Shirley Pascoe
- Adoptive father: Bernard Walker
- Adoptive mother: Brenda Walker
- Half-sisters: Chas Dingle
- Husband: Nikhil Sharma (2013)
- Daughters: Molly Sharma
- Grandfathers: Jedediah Dingle
- Grandmothers: Peg Dingle
- Uncles: Zak Dingle; Albert Dingle; Ezra Dingle; Caleb Dingle
- Nephews: Aaron Dingle
- First cousins: Sam Dingle; Lilith Dingle; Del Dingle; Marlon Dingle; Cain Dingle; Mandy Dingle; Eli Dingle; Belle Dingle
- Other relatives: Charity Dingle; Debbie Dingle; Ryan Stocks; Noah Dingle; April Windsor; Leo Goskirk; Moses Dingle; Obadiah Dingle

Genesis "Gennie" Walker is a fictional character from the British television soap opera Emmerdale, played by Sian Reese-Williams. She made her first appearance during the episode broadcast on 1 April 2008. Reese-Williams announced her departure from the show on 11 May 2013, and she made her last appearance on 26 July 2013.

Her storylines have focused on getting to know her family, the Dingles, including her birth father Shadrach Dingle (Andy Devine), developing unrequited feelings for Paddy Kirk (Dominic Brunt) and Bob Hope (Tony Audenshaw), her relationship with Jamie Hope (Alex Carter), her relationship and subsequent marriage to Nikhil Sharma (Rik Makarem), and being murdered by Cameron Murray (Dominic Power) after being involved in a car accident with him and Debbie Dingle (Charley Webb).

== Creation and development ==
Gennie Walker was created while Kathleen Beedles was the series producer. By the time Gennie's first episode was broadcast on 1 April 2008, Anita Turner had taken over from Beedles. Theatre actress Sian Reese-Williams was cast in the role and started filming in the week beginning 3 March 2008. Paula Lane, who was later cast as Ella Forster, also auditioned for the role. The character was described by Turner as "not your typical Dingle", adding that "we've got some exciting storylines planned" with Gennie in "for a real culture shock when she meets her biological family." In May 2008, Turner told Kris Green from Digital Spy that Gennie "could be brilliant and it's about her finding that inner Dingle". She added that Gennie has "really hidden depths – it's more about her future in Emmerdale, rather than her past."

Gennie is characterised as a "madcap" and "bubbly" member of the show's Dingle family. A writer from itv.com described her as being "keen" to fit in with her family, but is "easily-led and naïve" to their scheming ways. Gennie is portrayed as "unlucky in love" and writers portrayed her as unable to have a long-term relationship. They added that Gennie is "girlie and giggly and enjoys hanging out with her mates in the village." She likes bright clothes and rabbits, and has a fear of cellars and moths. Reese-Williams later revealed in 2024 that she struggled with Gennie's characterisation and revealed it had a negative effect on her own self-confidence. Reese-Williams stated that Gennie constantly being branded as "unlucky in love" and an "ugly duckling" affected her well-being even years after leaving the show.

Producers paired Gennie in a relationship with Nikhil Sharma (Rik Makarem) and writers developed a wedding storyline for them. Their wedding day becomes problematic when Brenda Walker (Lesley Dunlop) is diagnosed with a brain tumour. She refuses to attend Gennie's wedding because of her illness, which causes Gennie to question marrying Nikhil. Advance spoilers revealed that Gennie would attempt to convince Brenda to attend. A reporter from TV easy revealed that Gennie would try to flee her wedding over Brenda's absence. Nikhil then tries to convince Gennie to go through with the ceremony. Brenda then collapses and is rushed into hospital, further ruining their wedding day. The incident forces Brenda to agree to life saving brain surgery.

On 11 May 2013, it was announced via an itv.com report that Reese-Williams was leaving the role. She stated "I have absolutely adored my five years playing Gennie and being part of such an iconic show. My decision to leave has nothing to do with Emmerdale – it's such a special place and I will always cherish it – but I feel it's the right time for me to say goodbye and find new challenges." It was also revealed that Gennie would depart during the British summer months. Producers did not reveal details about Gennie's departure, urging viewers to keep watching. Five days later, Makarem's departure as Nikhil was announced with no details about his departure story given. On 25 July 2013, Gennie was killed off when Cameron Murray (Dominic Power) suffocated her following a car accident. Details of the murder were kept a secret to ensure viewers would be surprised. She made her final appearance on 26 July 2013.

== Storylines ==
Gennie is accidentally knocked off her motorbike by Ross Kirk (Samuel Anderson) while on her way to meet her biological father, Shadrach Dingle (Andy Devine). She recovers in the hospital and becomes friends with Ross and his cousin Paddy (Dominic Brunt) when they visit her in hospital. Paddy invites her to Eli Dingle's (Joseph Gilgun) 28th birthday party, and while she is there, Gennie meets Shadrach and realises that she has found her father and she later reluctantly talks to Shadrach. He tells how he started looking for her after his godson Daniel Thomas died of sudden infant death syndrome. Shadrach had planned to leave his wife for Gennie's mother, Shirley Pascoe, but she died in childbirth. Feeling unable to take her home, he gave her up for adoption.

Gennie soon grows close to her father and his family, although her half-sister Chas Dingle (Lucy Pargeter) is initially resentful of her presence and the attention she gets from Shadrach. Gennie tries to prove she is a true Dingle and finally does so when she steals a client from Eric Pollard (Chris Chittell), making money in the process. She also helps Eli and their cousin Sam (James Hooton) burn down Pollard's factory. After growing close to Eli, they share a kiss but he tells her that he is not attracted to her and she insists she isn't attracted to him. Soon, Gennie moves in with the Dingles, which upsets her adoptive mother, Brenda, who is concerned about Gennie not having a job and her change in character. Chas convinces Brenda that Gennie is working at the vets, and for a short time, she does work there. On her way to a call out, Gennie runs over and kills a sheep. She and Eli are arrested for stealing the vet's drugs, but are released when the locum vet, Josh, explains that she was taking the drugs to the farm. After this incident, her mother again tries to persuade her to come home, but Gennie refuses, saying she felt like she fitted in with the Dingles.

Gennie gets a job as a machinist at Eric Pollard's new factory, while Brenda starts working for Bob Hope (Tony Audenshaw) at the village post office and café. Gennie is not happy with this as it means Brenda would visit more often. She then becomes close to many local residents and eventually starts to tolerate her mother's presence. Gennie becomes concerned that Brenda is falling for Bob while his wife Viv (Deena Payne) is in prison and Gennie convinces Brenda to start dating Terry Woods (Billy Hartman) instead. Brenda and Gennie move into the vacant flat above the post office. Gennie joins the church choir after Nicola De Souza (Nicola Wheeler) hears her beautiful singing voice. Gennie is nervous about singing in front of other people, especially when she learns they would be entering a choir competition to help stop the church being closed as she was only comfortable singing when she was alone. They agreed that Gennie would stand offstage whilst Val Pollard (Charlie Hardwick) mimes to Gennie's voice, but at the event, Gennie is forced to take centre stage. They win a prize, but afterwards, Gennie is still too self-conscious to sing in front of anyone else.

Gennie develops feelings for Paddy, and Chas encourages her, even though she knows Paddy is more interested in her. Gennie sends him a Valentine's Day card, but Paddy thinks someone is making fun of him. Soon, Paddy and Chas get together and Gennie is hurt by her sister's actions. After Gennie tells her nephew, Aaron Livesy (Danny Miller), that Bob is due to give a large sum of money to his cash and carry firm, Aaron, Shadrach and Zak Dingle (Steve Halliwell) steal it to pay for repairs to Debbie Dingle's (Charley Webb) house. Bob's reputation is damaged as he is accused of stealing the money and he blames Brenda for distracting the delivery man and they have a bitter quarrel. Gennie soon realises the truth and begs her family to give the money back. They refuse and Gennie is horrified that no one agrees with her, not even her father, but they patch up their differences a few weeks later. Gennie develops a crush on Bob, despite the fact he is married. They become close when Brenda moves in with Terry and Bob and his twins move into the flat with Gennie. Bob is shocked when he learns of Gennie's feelings, who attempts to involve herself with other men to move on. However, they later sleep together and are shocked when Viv returns.

Gennie gets a job at the Sharma sweet factory and begins seeing Bob's son, Jamie (Alex Carter). Gennie and Jamie decide to move to Newquay when they are both offered new jobs. At their leaving party, Bob bids farewell to Gennie and kisses her on the forehead, which Jamie sees. Jamie accuses them of restarting their affair and tells Viv about it. Jamie tells Gennie that he loves her, but is not sure he can trust her, and he leaves for Newquay. Viv slaps Gennie for cheating while racked with guilt that she never settled to naming him her father. Gennie is promoted to PA at Sharma but is offended when she learns that Jai (Chris Bisson) and Nikhil chose her because Jai was unlikely to want to have sex with her. Gennie becomes interested in Nikhil and is jealous when he starts seeing Chas. Gennie tells Chas about her crush on Nikhil, which leads to a scuffle. However, Chas dumps Nikhil for Gennie's sake. When Gennie finally confesses her love for Nikhil to him, he rejects her.

Gennie later begins dating local vet Nicky Pritchard (Matt Milburn), which makes Nikhil jealous. He fights with Nicky and Gennie tells him to stay away from them. When Nikhil spots Nicky with another woman, he assumes that he is having an affair. However, Nicky explains that he was trying to get Gennie another job. Nikhil declares his love for Gennie and apologizes for his behaviour. Gennie forgives him and they share a passionate kiss. Gennie soon decides to be with Nikhil and splits with Nicky, who leaves the village. When Gennie discovers that she is 18 weeks pregnant, she is afraid to disclose it to Nikhil. When Gennie eventually works up the courage to tell Nikhil, he assumes from her behaviour that she is ending things. He breaks up with her first, but Charity tells him that Gennie is pregnant and Nikhil apologizes to her. Nikhil proposes to Gennie and she accepts. When Nikhil reveals that he knows about the baby, Gennie assumes that it was the only reason he proposed. Nikhil assures her that it was not and pledges his love to her and the baby.

Gennie gives birth to a daughter at Chas's wedding reception and she and Nikhil name her Molly. Gennie is devastated when Brenda is diagnosed with a brain tumour and she refuses treatment. Gennie and Nikhil bring the date of their wedding forward because of Brenda's illness, which angers her. She refuses to have the surgery or attend the wedding. On the day of the wedding, Gennie explains that she cannot get married without her mother there. Brenda eventually turns up, but she soon collapses and suffers a seizure. Brenda agrees to have surgery, which is successful. Gennie later helps Brenda shave her hair off and arrange a handfasting ceremony with Bob.

When Gennie suspects Chas's fiancé, Cameron Murray, is having an affair with Debbie, she hides in Debbie's house to catch them out. Gennie records a conversation between Cameron and Debbie whilst sitting at the top of their stairs, in which Cameron admits to killing Carl King (Tom Lister). Cameron and Debbie witness Gennie leaving the house and they give chase when Gennie gets in her car and drives off. Being a new driver, Gennie panics and starts speeding. She loses control of the car, and it plunges down a steep ravine. Gennie survives the crash and Cameron pulls her out of the wreckage. While Debbie is calling an ambulance, Gennie begs Cameron not to hurt her, but he suffocates her in order to keep his secret. Debbie is devastated when she sees Gennie is dead and believes she and Cameron are both responsible for her death. When the police and paramedics arrive, Debbie tells them that she saw the accident scene while driving by. Nikhil, Brenda, Bob and Chas are devastated when they learn Gennie has died.

== Reception ==
A writer from Holy Soap stated that Gennie's most memorable moment was her announcing that she is Shadrach's daughter. A writer from What's on TV described her as a "proud Dingle" but is "not nearly as hard-hearted" as the rest of the Dingle family. An itv.com reporter branded Gennie a "quirky and much-loved character". A writer from Heart opined that the character was "part of some huge storylines during her time" and her car crash "gripped viewers". Monde Mwitumwa from LeedsLive assessed that Gennie's "exit was a sad one". They added that Reese-Williams "is most remembered for her sleek brown bob and edgy fringe" that she had when she played Gennie. Daniel Kilkelly from Digital Spy assessed that Gennie's introduction into the series "got off to a dramatic start" with her being run over. He summed up her "major storylines" as being her fling with Bob, relationship with Nikhil and giving birth during the live episode. Kilkelly also chose Cameron threatening Gennie in the website's "pick of the day" feature. David Brown from Radio Times believed writers gave her "many high-profile storylines", noting her giving birth during the live episode and dealing with Brenda's cancer diagnosis were some of her final big stories. Katherine Heslop (Daily Mirror) similarly stated that "Gennie was known for her sleek brown bob on the show." Heslop added that Gennie was "initially unlucky in romance" until writers created her partnership with Nikhil. Of her exit story, she branded it a "tense car chase scene" and tragic themed. Gennie and Nikhil's relationship proved popular with viewers and they were given the portmanteau couple name of "GenHil". Sarah Waterfall from TV easy branded Gennie and Nikhil's wedding as a "must-see episode" and another branded her a "troubled bride".
