= Matthew Booth =

Matthew Booth may refer to:

- Matthew Booth (actor), English actor
- Matthew Booth (soccer) (born 1977), South African football defender
- Matthew Booth (film editor) on Man on the Train
