= Rodney Blackstock =

Fictional character from Emmerdale

- Emmerdale character
- Portrayed by: Patrick Mower
- Duration: 2000–present
- First appearance: Episode 2771; 24 October 2000
- Created by: Kieran Roberts
- Introduced by: Keith Richardson
In-universe information
- Occupation: Businessman; Chauffeur; Truck driver; Male escort; Café waiter
- Wife: Diane Sugden (backstory); Maureen Blackstock (backstory)
- Sons: Paul Lambert
- Daughters: Bernice Blackstock; Nicola King
- Granddaughters: Gabby Thomas; Dee Dee; Angelica King
- Other relatives: Thomas Tate

Rodney Blackstock is a fictional character from the British ITV soap opera Emmerdale, played by Patrick Mower. He made his first appearance during the episode broadcast on 24 October 2000. He was introduced as the estranged father of Bernice Blackstock (Samantha Giles), with his backstory involving him leaving her at five years old. Rodney has been described as an "ageing lothario" who enjoys wine, money and the company of women. In 2012, he was ranked within What's on TV's top 100 British soap characters of all time.

== Casting ==
Mower was cast in the regular role of Rodney following a 10-year absence from television. His character was introduced as the estranged father of Bernice Blackstock (Samantha Giles). He received the nickname "Hot Rod" due to his popularity with the show's female characters. Of his casting, Mower commented: "Soaps have really improved and they have good writers who write strong characters. I don't think they are looked down on by other actors any more. I do think there are going to be a few fireworks on screen with Rodney in Emmerdale. Now the show appears five nights it means working at a fast pace, which I enjoy." Mower made his debut as Rodney in October 2000.

== Development ==
Rodney's backstory involves being absent in Bernice's childhood, as well as not knowing he had a son, Paul Lambert (Matthew Bose), until later life. However, he is "now a hands on grandfather to Gabby and Angel". His backstory also includes writing a novel, Rollercoaster Rod, about his experiences working on a fairground. Rodney was described by ITV as a player and an "ageing lothario", as well as suave, roguish and charming. His ITV profile also noted that he likes the company of women, fine wines, money and calisthenics. He dislikes losing money and ageing.

== Storylines ==
Rodney is invited to Emmerdale by his daughter, Bernice's fiancé Ashley Thomas (John Middleton), who is initially unaware that Rodney walked out on her and her mother Diane Blackstock (Elizabeth Estensen) when she was five years old. When Bernice realises who Rodney is, she almost cancels the wedding, but on Christmas Day, Rodney watches on as Bernice and Ashley marry. Rodney decides to settle in the village and dates barmaid Louise Appleton (Emily Symons). Rodney and Diane clash on numerous occasions and eventually have an affair. Louise finds out and breaks up with Rodney. Rodney's youngest daughter Nicola Blackstock (Nicola Wheeler) comes to Emmerdale to get to know Bernice. They get on well, until Bernice has an affair with Nicola's fiancé, Carlos Diaz (Gary Turner). When Bernice leaves a few months later, Rodney is devastated.

Rodney has a brief fling with Steph Stokes (Lorraine Chase) and dates Diane's sister Val Lambert (Charlie Hardwick). When Diane learns she has colon cancer, Rodney declares his undying love to her. However, she refuses to rekindle their relationship and rejects him in favour of boyfriend Jack Sugden (Clive Hornby). When Diane and Jack marry, Rodney and Val have a vicious showdown outside the church during which she reveals that he is the father of her son, Paul Lambert (Mathew Bose). Unable to cope with Paul's sexuality, Rodney struggles to bond with his son and the pair spend months at loggerheads before finally reconciling. Diane eventually forgives Rodney and Val for having had an affair behind her back. Rodney is delighted when Nicola gets engaged to fishmonger Simon Meredith (Dale Meeks), until his mother, Lesley Meredith (Sherrie Hewson), develops a crush on him. They have sex, but Rodney has regrets as he is not attracted to Lesley. Kelly Windsor (Adele Silva) takes Lesley's place at an event Rodney is attending, which leaves her humiliated and heartbroken. A serious relationship develops between Kelly and Rodney.

When Lesley assumes Nicola is having an affair with Paul's boyfriend Ivan Jones (Daniel Brocklebank), Rodney takes Nicola's side. But when it emerges that Nicola has been trying to seduce Ivan, Rodney feels guilty and his relationship with Paul suffers. He and Paul eventually reconcile and Rodney later takes over planning Paul's wedding to Jonny Foster (Richard Grieve). Rodney loses both his house and antiques business due to owing a large amount of money to the Inland Revenue. He undertakes a variety of jobs, including a solar panel salesman and window cleaner. He finds permanent employment at Home Farm, working for the King brothers, Matthew King (Matt Healy), Jimmy King (Nick Miles) and Carl King (Tom Lister). When Nicola returns to the village after eighteen months, Rodney moves in with her after Paul forces him to choose between them. Rodney soon mends his relationship with Paul and works with Val to plan the stag do and reception for their son's civil partnership. Rodney rents Mill Brook Cottage from the Kings, agreeing to live with his daughter as long as she pays half the rent. When he discovers that Nicola has sold his "Rollercoaster Rod" stories to a publisher, claiming to have written them herself, Rodney throws her out.

When Bernice and Ashley's daughter Gabby Thomas (Annelise Manojlovic) feels alone, she begins spending time with Rodney. Val tells Paul that Rodney has a serious heart condition to make him stay in the village when he considers moving to Australia with Jonny. Rodney has an affair with the married Pam Montclare (Catherine Rabett). When Paul and Diane tell him to end the affair because of his heart condition, Pam leaves, not wanting to get involved. Rodney tells Paul and Diane that he is fine, and he later accompanies Paul to the airport. Laurel tells Rodney that Nicola is pregnant and he urges her to keep the baby, but Nicola tells him that he had been a bad father to her and she does not want to put her own baby through a bad experience. She eventually keeps the baby and Rodney lets her move her back into his home. Rodney gets a job at Emmerdale Haulage after he strikes a deal with Carl in which he takes Carl's driving points in exchange for £500 and a job.

Rodney becomes a male escort and does not tell his girlfriend Georgia Sharma (Trudie Goodwin). While he is on a date with a woman, Georgia's ex-husband Rishi Sharma (Bhasker Patel) finds them together. Rodney asks Rishi to keep it a secret. He continues to enjoy his escort career, until one night in The Woolpack, Georgia's friends from tennis arrive for drinks and Rodney is shocked to see that one of the tennis friends, Veronica (Nicole Faraday), has met him before when he accompanied her to a formal party. Veronica tells Georgia the truth and they break up. Rodney is devastated, however, with the help of Bob Hope (Tony Audenshaw), Georgia takes him back and agrees to let him continue his career as an escort, due to the money he earns. Other residents soon find out about his new job, including Jimmy and Bernice, who disapproves. Rodney meets up with Veronica once more to take her out, but she insists that they stay home instead and cooks him a meal. She tries to seduce him but he refuses. On Rodney's next date, he is asked to make a woman's husband jealous. But when the husband confronts Rodney, he blames Val's husband Eric Pollard (Chris Chittell), which results in Eric getting punched in front of Val. Eric and Val decide to get revenge on Rodney by scaring him while he is alone at the B&B one evening.

Val discovers that she has HIV and she tells everybody in The Woolpack, including Rodney. By this time, Eric and Val have broken up due to Eric's concerns about HIV, but they reconcile and Eric decides to take part in a sponsored skydive. Eric torments Rodney over not doing it, so Rodney signs up. However, on the day of the dive, Eric feels that he cannot go through with it. Rodney tells Eric that his relationship with Val is worth fighting for and Eric, startled at Rodney's support, tells him that it is the nicest thing he has ever said to him. Rodney opposes Bernice's casual relationship with farmhand Andy Sugden (Kelvin Fletcher) due to their age difference.

== Reception ==
The character was selected as one of the "top 100 British soap characters" by industry experts for a poll to be run by What's on TV, with readers able to vote for their favourite character to discover "Who is Soap's greatest Legend?"
