= Jamie Hope =

Fictional character from Emmerdale

- Emmerdale character
- Portrayed by: Alex Carter
- Duration: 2006–2010
- First appearance: 16 February 2006
- Last appearance: 21 May 2010
- Created by: Kathleen Beedles
In-universe information
- Father: Bob Hope
- Mother: Jean Hope
- Stepmother: Viv Hope
- Sisters: Dawn Woods
- Half-brothers: Josh Hope; Heath Hope
- Half-sisters: Carly Hope; Roxy Lockhart; Cathy Hope
- Uncles: Eddie Hope
- Nephews: T.J. Woods

Jamie Hope is a fictional character in "Emmerdale", a British soap opera broadcast on ITV, portrayed by actor Alex Carter. The character debuted on the show on 16 February 2006 and made his final appearance on 21 May 2010. Carter's departure from the series was motivated by his decision to explore new professional opportunities beyond the soap opera.

== Casting ==
Carter's casting was announced in November 2005. Jamie was introduced as the eldest son of the established character Bob Hope (Tony Audenshaw) and debuted on 16 February 2006. On 8 February 2010, Carter announced that he was quitting the show, citing an exhausting filming schedule as the reason. Following Carter's departure, he and Audenshaw remained good friends. In 2018 and 2023 interviews with Inside Soap, Audenshaw revealed that he wanted Carter to return to the soap as Jamie, praising Carter's acting skills and commenting that the potential of Jamie's character was "never really looked at properly".

== Storylines ==
Jamie feels like his father Bob had abandoned him and his sister Dawn when they were children, and although she had managed to rebuild her relationship with Bob, Jamie is not sure he can. He is scared and afraid of the cold relationship between his marriage. The marriage of Bob to his fourth wife Viv proved enough of a draw to get Jamie to let bygones be bygones. When they met, it becomes immediately clear Jamie and Bob were cut from the same cloth.

Even though he had decided to attend the wedding, Jamie changed his mind and realized that he couldn't forgive his father after all. He punched his father at the reception when Bob had a go at his mother Jean, causing Jamie's resentment to boil to the surface again. Jamie told Bob he could never forgive him. When Jamie flew back to Spain, Bob was saddened. He had wanted another chance to get to know his son so much, but it seemed all was lost. So, when Jamie arrived back a few weeks later, Bob was overjoyed.

However, Jamie wasn't after a reunion with his father. Pretending to be the dutiful son, Jamie tried to con Bob out of £2,000 to pay off an ex-girlfriend who was keeping his dog, Snoop, hostage. When Bob rumbled Jamie’s plan, he was heartbroken. He threatened to cut Jamie off forever if he walked away with the money and after much soul-searching, Jamie decided he wanted to get to know his father after all.

Whilst working at his stepmother Viv’s café to pay off the loan Bob had given him, Jamie was bored and frustrated – especially when his exotic food ideas were being disregarded. He stumbled upon a new venue of employment when local antiques dealer Rodney Blackstock gave him the chance to prove what a great salesman he was. He made a tidy profit, but a full-time position didn’t materialize, so a resourceful Jamie decided to do it alone again.

After Dawn died in the Kings River Show home explosion, Jamie and Bob started a vendetta against the King family. However, as time passed, Bob became worried that Jamie would take the ultimate revenge. On the day Tom King died, Jamie was at Home Farm with revenge in mind. He was separated from Bob and made his way home and lied about going to Home Farm. Bob believed Jamie could be the killer, so he confessed. When Jamie found out, he made a statement to the police, saying he was at Home Farm and didn't have an alibi for the time of death. Realizing they didn't have enough evidence to prosecute Bob, the police released him. However, both father and son remained suspects for the murder.

In 2007, Jamie got a job as a postman but found the job very demanding. Also, he had a one-night stand with Louise Appleton in his ice cream van. They soon began a relationship, but Jamie was disappointed when Louise was embarrassed to be seen in public with him. He confronted her, and they went public, despite being an odd match. Louise was seventeen years older than Jamie, but they had a strong bond.

In 2008, Louise feared she was pregnant. Jamie found the pregnancy testing kit, which revealed she wasn't. He was pleased, but Louise was angry with Jamie for being so obviously pleased. This led to them splitting up briefly, but soon got back together and became engaged.

In July, Jamie was furious to discover that Louise had blackmailed Viv to obtain her café and post office. Louise apologized and they were soon back to normal.

In September, Jamie and Louise set a date for their wedding to be around Christmas. They were in the process of arranging their wedding when Louise started getting telephone calls from a man called Jonty DeLorean. Louise refused to discuss this with anyone, leading Bob, Terry Woods, and Betty Eagleton to think she was having an affair. She eventually revealed that while in Australia, she had won a beauty contest for the over 30s, and Jonty was her manager. Disappointed that Jamie could think so badly of her, Louise left for Australia with Jonty, but Jamie arrived at the last minute and proposed again. Louise accepted and they left together.

Jamie returned to the village in late November, claiming it was due to a massive fear of exotic such as snakes and scorpions; it was later revealed that he had punched a national icon, a kangaroo. He went back to visit Louise after Mark Wylde gave him compensation for accidentally knocking him off a ladder.

When Diane Sugden returned from a trip to Australia to visit Louise and her nephew, Paul Lambert who emigrated there with his partner, Jonny Foster, Diane revealed that shortly after her return, Louise had broken off her engagement to Jamie and sent him back the engagement ring.

Jamie later falls in love with Gennie Walker who had previously had an affair with Bob whilst Viv had been in prison for fraud, and starts a relationship with her. In May 2010, Jamie and Gennie planned to leave Emmerdale and move to Newquay where they had both been offered new jobs. At their leaving party in the Woolpack, Jamie caught Bob saying farewell to Gennie and kissing her on the forehead. Because they had been out of view from everyone else at the pub, Jamie assumed the worst and thought that Bob and Gennie had restarted their affair. Viv subsequently found out about Bob cheating on her whilst she had been in prison. After a tearful conversation with Gennie, Jamie realized that nothing had happened between Gennie and his father. But the memory of what happened between her, and Bob was too much for him to cope with, so he ended their relationship, leaving Gennie heartbroken. After also bidding farewell to his father, Jamie left the village, driving to Newquay alone for a fresh start.
