= Louise Appleton =

Fictional character from Emmerdale

- Emmerdale character
- Portrayed by: Emily Symons
- Duration: 2001–2008
- First appearance: 20 June 2001
- Last appearance: 28 October 2008
- Introduced by: Keith Richardson
In-universe information
- Occupation: Pub landlady Businesswoman
- Husband: Alex Hastie (backstory)

Louise Appleton is a fictional character from the British ITV soap opera Emmerdale, played by Emily Symons. She made her first screen appearance during the episode broadcast on 20 June 2001. Louise arrived in the village as a temporary barmaid and ended up as co-landlady with best friend Diane Sugden (Elizabeth Estensen), before selling to Diane's sister Val Lambert (Charlie Hardwick) in 2006. The character last appeared in Emmerdale on 28 October 2008.

== Casting ==
Symons was in London and struggling to get an agent when she was asked to join Emmerdale. The producers were looking for an Australian to play their "sassy new Woolpack barmaid", Louise Appleton. They were so keen to have Symons that they did not audition her. The actress was given an initial six-month contract and Symons commuted up to Leeds from London for filming. Symons began filming her first scenes in May 2001 and she told Allison Maund of Inside Soap that Louise would be nothing like her "ditzy" Home and Away character, Marilyn Chambers.

== Storylines ==
The men of Emmerdale could not believe their luck when gorgeous Australian Louise arrived and started work at The Woolpack. Bright, beautiful and classy, Louise was the full package but much to the young men's disappointment, she started dating older lothario Rodney Blackstock. The couple had a fun relationship and enjoyed each other's company but it didn't last as Rodney was still in love with his ex-wife, Diane Blackstock. Unfortunately Diane was also Louise's best friend and when she discovered that Rodney and Diane had slept together, Louise dumped Rodney but forgave Diane and continued to work at the Woolpack.

Her next boyfriend was shady businessman Ray Mullan. Louise was happy with Ray and moved in with him but Ray was not the man Louise thought he was. Wanting to control her, Ray made her think she was being stalked so she would agree to emigrate to Italy. As they drove to the airport, Louise discovered Ray was her stalker and a vicious fight ensued, culminating in her accidentally killing Ray and concealing it in Boxing Day 2002. Terry Woods, helped by making it look like someone had broken in (which the police believed as he mixed with many dangerous criminals.) Besotted, Terry would do anything for her but her gratitude didn't mean she was prepared to date him so Terry had to accept that they would only be friends. Louise was further shocked when Ray's brother came to the village and told her she was the only woman to survive her relationship with Ray and following the ordeal Louise spent much of 2003 on a downward spiral of depression and self-destruction alienating those around her. Diane acknowledged she had become a cold, cruel woman since Ray's murder and a bitter tension arose between them, particularly after Louise began seeing local married man, Ronnie Marsden. When their affair was exposed, the rift got stronger and Louise was humiliated and hated being the centre of local gossip but she and Diane eventually reconciled when Louise told Diane what really happened. The next day, Ronnie's wife Frances Marsden confronts and realizes that Louise had slept with Ronnie. She soon found herself in the thick of it again when she began dating vicar, Ashley Thomas. Their affair was short-lived and Louise agreed to a date with Carl King, but dumped him when she realised he was married.

Meanwhile, Terry moved on by marrying teenager, Dawn Hope. Seeing them together made Louise realise that she did have feelings for him after all and started dating after Terry and Dawn split up in 2004. Realising their relationship was serious, Terry and Louise decided to buy Alan Turner's B&B. Newcomer Matthew King offered financial advice and helped organise a mortgage – but wanted more than Louise's business. After pursuing her for weeks, Louise and Matthew began a passionate affair. Although she hated lying to Terry, Louise could not resist Matthew but eventually decided that she wanted to be with Matthew and ended things with Terry – just as they were about to complete the sale of the B&B. Louise shocked the village with her actions and even Diane was unable to feel any sympathy when Matthew abruptly dropped her days later. Realizing she'd been played, Louise threw herself on Terry's mercy but he didn't want to know. Alone and distraught, Louise went home to Australia. When she got back, Louise tried to put her life in order. She kept her head down, tried to make amends with her friends and steered clear of men but she was not alone for long.

When she met police officer Martin Crowe at a kid's judo class, Louise felt a frisson of attraction. They became friends and after a while, romance blossomed. However, Louise was taking on Martin's daughter, Kayleigh, too. As she didn't have children, Louise didn't know how to behave around Kayleigh – who worshipped her from the start. Louise muddled through with advice from Diane and Martin and Kayleigh moved into the Woolpack with Louise. They were happy together until Martin learned that Sam Dingle had helped his wife, Alice, die of terminal cancer, and set out to arrest him. Louise stood by Martin, causing friction between her and Diane and during a row om which Louise said Sam needed to be punished for breaking the law, Diane called out Louise's hypocrisy due to her involvement in Ray's death, which Martin overheard so Louise had to come clean. Martin promised not to report her but ended their relationship so Martin and a tearful Kayleigh moved out of the Woolpack. Devastated as Louise had thought Martin was "the one", she blamed Diane for the break-up and deliberately sold her share of the Woolpack to someone who Diane would not like working with, her sister, Val Lambert, putting the money into the B&B with her ex, Terry and his girlfriend, Jean Hope. They had planned to buy the B&B together but Jean could not raise the money needed so Louise stepped in.

In May 2007, it was stated that a "much loved" character would be killed at the village's anniversary and rumours arose that it would be Louise. She was involved in a car crash after ex-fiancée Hari Prasad ran her off the road. He knew that she was going to the police to admit that she had given a false statement, leading to Hari's arrest. Luckily Louise survived and told the police about her and Hari's lies so he was arrested for attempted murder and perverting the course of justice and was jailed for his crimes, selling his share of the veterinary surgery to Rosemary Sinclair.

In 2008, Louise received a lot of comments about her relationship with Jamie, who is seventeen years younger than her. Believing that she was not good enough for him, she accused him of having an affair with a wine tasting woman. However, Jamie was having lessons so they could drink together so they reconciled. Later in the year, Louise feared she was pregnant but Jamie's relief to discover she was not made Louise unsure of their relationship. Jamie apologized repeatedly but he kept saying the wrong things. They became friends again and Jamie even proposed. The two were then engaged.

In May, Louise provided an alibi for Viv Hope who was charged with conspiracy to defraud. She is among a few villagers who believe Viv is innocent. However, Louise blackmailed Viv when she discovered that Viv had kissed Freddie Yorke in order to obtain Viv's businesses. Viv's husband, and Jamie's father, Bob found out and told Jamie but the two stuck together. After visiting her family in Australia, Louise returned to the village in September and they decided to get married at Christmas. In October, Terry began suspecting Louise was having an affair when T.J. drew a picture of her with two boyfriends. Louise angrily refused to discuss the matter when questioned so Terry and Bob told Jamie who confronted Louise and grew frustrated by her refusal to divulge Jonty's identity. In the pub later on, Louise quashed speculation by revealing she won a beauty contest in Australia and that Jonty is her manager. However, hurt by Jamie's lack of respect and trust, she called off the wedding. Bob and Terry were horrified to see Louise and Jonty kiss when he arrived. Jonty asked Louise to return to Australia with him, but Jamie saw them and hit Jonty before storming off. Bob and Terry talked to Jonty, who shocked them by producing the volume of publicity Louise's competition win had generated. With the promise of more work heading her way, Louise returned to Australia. In a race against time, Bob and Terry found Jamie as the villagers threw an impromptu going away party to stall Louise's exit. However, Terry's car broke down on the way back and they had to take Jamie's ice cream van. Back in the village, Jamie was a no-show and Louise prepared to leave in a horse-drawn carriage. However, Jamie arrived at the last second and begged Louise to marry him. Louise agreed and they left for Australia together. Jamie returns alone the following month after he and Louise split up.

== Reception ==
For her portrayal of Louise, Symons earned a nomination for Most Popular Newcomer at the 8th National Television Awards. Symons was also nominated for "Funniest Performance" at the 2007 Inside Soap Awards.
