= Ray Ashcroft =

English actor

- Born: Raymond John Ashcroft
- Occupation: Actor

Raymond John Ashcroft is an English actor. He is best known for his roles as DS Geoff Daly in The Bill from 1996 to 2000, and Ronnie Marsden on Emmerdale from March to December 2003.

== Career ==
In the late 1970s, Ashcroft was the frontman of The Push, a Sheffield band. He started acting in repertory theatre before working in television and film productions.

He played Ringo Starr in the biopic TV film Birth of the Beatles (1979), and he has also appeared in various television productions including Coronation Street.

Ashcroft played DS Geoff Daly in The Bill from 1996 to 2000 before portraying Ronnie Madsen in Emmerdale (2003).

In 2018, he portrayed Tom Jackson, a Yorkshire miner, in the play On Behalf of the People.

In 2021, he played the lead role of Horace in the short film Mr Wong's Lullaby.

== Filmography ==
- Coronation Street
- Heartbeat
- Survivors
- Dalziel and Pascoe
- Hetty Wainthropp Investigates
- September Song
- The Paul Merton Show
- The Royal
- All Creatures Great and Small
- Prime Suspect
- EastEnders
- The Chief
- Chandler & Co
- Hollyoaks
- Doctors
- The Squad
- Children's Ward
- Criminal
- Truckers
- Mr Wong's Lullaby (2021)
- Tales from the Apocalypse (2023)
