= Bob Hope (Emmerdale) =

Fictional character from Emmerdale

- Emmerdale character
- Portrayed by: Tony Audenshaw
- Duration: 2000–present
- First appearance: Episode 2749; 19 September 2000
- Introduced by: Keith Richardson
In-universe information
- Occupation: Hosiery salesman; Bartender; Cafe owner
- Brothers: Eddie Hope
- Wife: Jean Hope (backstory, married twice); Barbara Hope (backstory); Vonda Lockhart (backstory); Viv Hope (2001–2005, 2006–2011); Brenda Walker (2018–2019)
- Sons: Jamie Hope; Josh Hope; Heath Hope
- Daughters: Dawn Woods; Carly Hope; Roxy Lockhart; Cathy Hope
- Stepsons: Scott Windsor
- Stepdaughters: Kelly Windsor; Donna Windsor
- Grandsons: T.J. Woods; Billy Hope

Bob Hope is a fictional character from the British ITV soap opera Emmerdale, played by Tony Audenshaw. Prior to playing Bob, the actor had previously made a guest appearance in the show as a security guard. Bob was introduced as a hosiery salesman and love interest for Viv Windsor (Deena Payne). He made his first appearance during the episode broadcast on 19 September 2000. Bob is portrayed as having a happy-go-lucky, cheeky persona, and is Emmerdale's most married character with seven marriages to five women. His storylines have included marriage, divorce, fatherhood, adultery and homelessness plus the deaths of two of his children, Dawn Woods (Julia Mallam) in 2006 and Heath Hope (Sebastian Dowling) in 2024.

== Creation and casting ==
In 2000, Emmerdale began airing five nights a week, and producer Kieran Roberts planned to introduce six new characters, the first of which was Bob, who made his first appearance in September. Roberts teased Bob's arrival during an interview with Inside Soap's Rachel Roberts, saying he was "an outrageous, very funny character". He said Bob was a hosiery salesman who would "provide some long overdue love interest for Viv Windsor." Tony Audenshaw auditioned for the role earlier that year. He previously had a guest role in the serial as a security guard. Deena Payne, who plays Viv Windsor, was screen tested with Audenshaw and five other actors. When the producer asked if she had a preference, she replied that she did not like the fourth actor, who turned out to be Audenshaw.

A couple of weeks later, the producer told Payne that Audenshaw had been cast as Bob. Payne told Tony Purnell from the Daily Mirror that she dreaded her first scene with Audenshaw and was nervous about "getting up close and personal" with him. However, when the two actors got talking in between scenes, they started to get on well. Audenshaw commented "I'm aware Deena didn't think I was right for the part at first. But we clicked early on and have built up a great working relationship. People assume she is like Viv – a nightmare on the set and a bitch to work with. I just say, 'Yeah, she is', but I'm only joking."

== Characterisation ==
Audenshaw said that he loved the comedy aspect to Bob, but was not keen on his "ludicrous hairstyle". The actor explained that it took ages "to quiff up" and spray it, so it would stay in place. While travelling around the country selling hosiery, Bob meets Viv, who had not had a major love interest since the death of her husband two years prior. Audenshaw joked that as soon as Bob meets Viv "there's animal passion" between them. He continued, "At the beginning it's more from him than her, but he soon charms Viv and they become very flirty." He believed Bob was the right man for Viv, as he has confidence and a fun personality.

On his ITV profile, Bob is described as a "ladies' man", as well as a joker that is "full of bright ideas". It notes that as an ex-salesman, not all of his business ideas were successful, but that his awareness changed when he decided to open the café in Emmerdale village. The profile details that Bob has been married to five different women, but that his "fear of commitment" was "quashed" when he got with Brenda Walker (Lesley Dunlop). Bob is billed as a "loveable, optimistic, compassionate, funny, popular" character that likes flirting and attending parties, and dislikes being alone.

== Storylines ==
=== Backstory ===
In Bob's fictional backstory, he was married and divorced four times before his introduction. His first wife was Jean Hope (Julie Higginson; Susan Penhaligon), whom he married and divorced twice. She is the mother of Dawn (Julia Mallam) and Jamie Hope (Alex Carter), but the marriage ended when he walked out. His third marriage was to Barbara Hope; they also had two children, Josh Hope (Marc Silcock) and Carly Hope (Rebecca Ryan; Gemma Atkinson), but this marriage ended in divorce when he again walked out. His fourth marriage was to American Vonda Lockhart (Lorelei King) in Las Vegas while drunk, which he regretted the following day. Vonda fell pregnant on their wedding night, resulting in the birth of daughter Roxy.

=== 2000–present ===
As part of his job as a sales representative for Naughty Nylons, Bob comes to Emmerdale for business. He and Viv Windsor are immediately attracted to each other and they begin a relationship. Bob moves in with Viv and tries to make friends with her daughter Donna Windsor (Verity Rushworth). He proposes while drunk and he and Viv marry the following year. Bob's daughter Dawn moves to the village and gets engaged to his friend, Terry Woods (Billy Hartman), who is 27 years older than her. They later have a son T.J. Woods (Connor Lee). Viv and Bob separate, after Viv has a one-night stand with a limousine driver, but in the same year they reconcile after her affair with married Paddy Kirk (Dominic Brunt), and they become engaged again. Bob is reunited with his former and ex-wife, American exotic dancer Vonda Lockhart (Lorelei King) and learns he has a daughter Roxy Lockhart (Chloe Procter), after Viv tracks her down to invite her to their second wedding. Bob and Viv marry in a double wedding with Viv's daughter Donna and Marlon Dingle.

Viv and Bob declare that they are going to try for a baby, however this proves difficult because of their ages and Dr. Adam Forsythe (Richard Shelton) tells them that Viv is now menopausal. This leads her to ask her daughter, Donna, to be their surrogate mother but on the day of Dawn's funeral, Viv is feeling unwell. Bob assumes she is hungover but is rushed to hospital by Donna when she collapses and learns that she is pregnant. Following Dawn's death in the King's River showhome explosion, Bob declares repeatedly that he does not want any more children so Viv decides to have an abortion but Viv tells Donna, she tells Scott and he tells Terry. Scott and Terry tell Bob about Viv's pregnancy and they decide to keep the baby. When Viv goes for a scan, they learn that she is carrying twins.

Viv gives birth to the twins, Cathy and Heathcliff in a shack on the moors, hence the babies' names as a reference to Wuthering Heights. On Emily Kirk's (Kate McGregor) return, Bob worries that she will snatch the twins and he temporarily quits his job as barman at the Woolpack to be a stay at home father. Viv becomes involved with Freddie Yorke's (Keith Goodason) children's charity known as the Happy Smile Fund. Early the following year, Bob and Viv discover that the money raised for the charity is missing. They are soon arrested for the fraud committed by Freddie and everything they do seems to strengthen the case against them. Distressed at the prospect of a prison sentence, losing their money and their reputation being destroyed, Bob is further devastated to learn that Freddie and Viv had kissed once. Bob forgives Viv, and they consider running away with the twins, but Jamie convinces them to stay and face the consequences.

Donna is nearly killed while in a high-speed car chase with Freddie. Viv cannot deal with the pain her actions have caused her family, and pleads guilty to the charges against her. Despite being innocent, she confesses and claims Bob knew nothing of her crimes. She is sentenced to three years in prison and Bob is devastated, even more so when she refuses to allow him to visit her and returns photos of the children. Bob tries to run the cafe and post office as well as work shifts in The Woolpack and raise the twins on his own. Jamie is concerned that Bob was going to run away again and Bob is hurt by his son's lack of trust. Even more distress is caused when John McNally (Steven Farebrother), a local reporter for the Hotten Courier, writes a story implicating Bob for fraud. Nicola De Souza (Nicola Wheeler) leads the villagers in threatening to sue Bob for the charity money. Bob finally snaps and demands to see the editor of the Courier, and when his permission is refused, he hijacks a cherrypicker outside the building and manoeuvres it as close to the top of the building as possible, in order to warn people of the evils of the Courier. He begin to suffer an anxiety attack and is brought to safety by the police and arrested but the charges against him are dropped. The villagers also drop their lawsuit plans.

Bob leaves Brenda in charge of the café while he visits Roxy and Vonda. When he returns, he is desperate to see Viv and concocts several schemes to get into the prison. Finally, posing as his friend Terry, he gets a job as a drama teacher and pretends he is reading from a script about a man who misses his wife. Viv is reduced to tears as she tells him again that contact with him is too painful for her. The warden discovers Bob's true identity and promises not to press charges on condition that Bob never returns. Bob tries to focus on his business and the children, but is shocked when he realises that Brenda has feelings for him. Because he still loves Viv, Bob sets her up with Terry but panics when Viv asks him to visit, assuming that she wants a divorce and has a drunken one-night stand with Brenda's daughter, Gennie Walker (Sian Reese-Williams). The next day, they agree it was a mistake and to keep it between them but the truth emerges when Gennie starts dating Jamie. Bob persuades Jamie not to say anything to Viv, despite repeated barbed comments.

Bob is also shocked by Viv's sudden release from prison and has trouble persuading Viv and Brenda to learn to work together. Viv assumes that Brenda is simply an employee and threatens to sack her repeatedly until Bob finally tells her that Brenda is a partner because she bailed him out of serious financial difficulties, following her conviction. She is shocked to learn this and apologises to both of them but on learning of Bob and Gennie's one-night stand, throws him out and demands a divorce. She soon regrets this and tries to reconcile with him but he is not interested so Viv gets jealous when he befriends any other females. She also tries using the twins to get his attention and even fakes a break-in to the shop. She also tries making Bob jealous by pretending that she has moved on and making up stories about men she has met, but to no avail.

When a fire is set at Victoria Cottage by Nick Henshall (Michael McKell), it spreads through the village, and sets fire to the café and Viv's flat. Bob and Terry run into the flames to save Viv and the twins. Bob emerges with Cathy and Heath, but the building explodes, killing both Terry and Viv. Bob buys a cottage in the village and moves in with Dan Spencer (Liam Fox). Bob and Brenda re-open the café and name it Café Hope in memory of Viv. Bob develops feelings for Brenda and is initially unaware that she loves him too. They eventually begin a relationship. Brenda is diagnosed with a brain tumour. Brenda ends her relationship with Bob. Gennie sees how much Bob and Brenda love each other and brings them back together, while Dan tells Bob about Brenda's tumour. Brenda undergoes surgery to remove the tumour and Bob supports her when she goes through chemotherapy. Brenda organises a handfasting for herself and Bob, while Bob plans a proposal with Dan's help. On the day of the handfasting ceremony, Bob proposes to Brenda, serenading her with a brass band. Brenda accepts and she tells Bob about the handfasting. They then go through with the ceremony surrounded by their family and friends.

Bob and Brenda are devastated when Gennie is murdered by Cameron Murray (Dominic Power). Bob comforts Brenda as much as he can, but knows that she is struggling to cope with Gennie's death and her tumour. Donna returns to the village after five years away with a daughter, April Windsor (Amelia Flanagan). Bob is shocked to see Donna in the village, and offers her and April a place to stay. Unlike the rest of the villagers, Bob and Brenda knew about April from being in contact with Donna, and Viv's funeral. Bob is just as shocked as everyone else when Donna reveals Marlon is April's father, and she was nine weeks pregnant when she left the village. When Bob asks Donna if Viv knew she had another granddaughter, Donna says Viv knew, and met April when Viv visited Donna when Viv was released from Prison. Donna then reveals that Viv knew about April being Marlon's daughter, but didn't tell anybody anything as it was what Donna wanted. Bob tells Donna that he never believed that Viv could keep a secret.

Bob begins an affair with Laurel Thomas (Charlotte Bellamy). He expresses his love for Laurel and desire to leave Brenda, which Laurel is hesitant about to avoid hurting Brenda. Brenda spots them kissing, but does not reveal that she has spotted them and continues planning her wedding to Bob. Laurel later ends the affair with Bob. Brenda steals Laurel's credit card and makes purchases from it. When the fraud is traced to Brenda, Laurel confronts her and Brenda admits she stole the credit card to avenge Bob and Laurel's affair. When Laurel assures Brenda that the affair is over, Brenda insists that they should carry on as if nothing has happened. Shocked Laurel reveals to Bob that Brenda knows about their affair, which Bob sees as an opportunity to leave Brenda for Laurel now there are no secrets, but Laurel remains resistant. Bob and Brenda marry, but Brenda notices that Bob is miserable and tells him at their wedding reception that he should reconcile with Laurel as it is clear that Bob loves Laurel and only married Brenda out of guilt.

== Reception ==
At the 2001 Inside Soap Awards, Audenshaw earned nominations for Best Newcomer, Funniest Character and Best Couple, the latter alongside Payne. In 2008, Audenshaw and Payne were nominated for Best On-Screen Partnership at the Digital Spy Soap Awards. An Inside Soap reporter included Bob in a feature profiling soap opera characters with odd names because he shared the name with American entertainer Bob Hope. They noted that "the problem with borrowing a famous name for a soap character is one of association. How can we help put picture the Dale's finest hosiery salesman except as wise-cracking down the Road to Zanzibar with Bing Crosby and Dorothy Lamour?" In 2024, Laura-Jayne Tyler from the same magazine commented on how three of Bob's children and one of his wives had suffered "awful, grisly deaths" despite Bob intending to be the soap's "most reliable source of comedy".
