= Ben Freeman =

English actor (born 1980)

- Born: Benedict Freeman; 8 April 1980 (age 46); England, United Kingdom
- Occupation: Actor
- Years active: 1996–present
- Television: Emmerdale; EastEnders
- Spouse: Jennifer Biddall

Benedict Freeman (born 8 April 1980) is an English actor, known for playing Scott Windsor in the ITV soap opera Emmerdale. After leaving Emmerdale in 2007, he embarked on a career in musical theatre, and has since played various roles in the West End. In 2021, he joined the cast of the BBC soap opera EastEnders as Caleb Malone.

== Career ==
Freeman's first role was as Chris Longworth in the children's series Grange Hill from 1996 to 1998. After Freeman left Grange Hill, he was cast as Scott Windsor in Emmerdale, taking over from previous actor Toby Cockerell. He played the part for nine years. Following his departure from Emmerdale in 2007, Freeman took his career to the stage, playing the Prince in William Shakespeare's Romeo and Juliet, Warner in the final cast of Legally Blonde and Norman in Dreamboats and Petticoats, both in West End theatre. On 29 October 2012, he joined the cast of Wicked in the West End, playing Fiyero. He left the show on 16 November 2013, and joined the British touring cast of a musical version of the American sitcom Happy Days, playing The Fonz. The tour finished in July 2014.

In December 2015, Freeman joined the British touring cast of The Rocky Horror Show, where he played Brad Majors. In May 2018, Freeman played the lead role of Ed Leighton in an independent British film Hooligan Escape the Russian Job. Dave Adamaon of VultureHound praised his contributions to the film, noting his "convincing" and "robust" performance. In November 2018, he played the title role of Robin Hood in an independent British film titled Robin Hood: The Rebellion. Then in April 2019, he appeared in the BBC soap opera Doctors as Adrian Richards. In January 2021, he joined the BBC soap opera EastEnders in the role of Caleb Malone.

== Personal life ==
Freeman was in a relationship with Emmerdale co-star Amy Nuttall which ended in 2009.

In 2010, he married Jennifer Biddall, an actress.

== Filmography ==
Year	Title	Role	Notes
1996–1998	Grange Hill	Chris Longworth	Main role
1998–2007	Emmerdale	Scott Windsor	Series regular (884 episodes)
2018	Hooligan Escapes the Russian Job	Ed Leighton	Film
2018	Solo!	Gavin	Film
2018	Robin Hood: The Rebellion	Robin Hood	Film
2019	Doctors	Sgt Adrian Richards	Episode: "Veneer"
2021	EastEnders	Caleb Malone	Guest role (6 episodes)
2021	The Dark Channel	Ed Wiseman	Film
2022	Matilda the Musical	Miracle Parent	Film
2023	The Three Musketeers	Athos	Film
2024	Outlander	Corporal Jethro Woodbine	1 episode
2025	Shakespeare & Hathaway: Private Investigators	James Colvy	Film
2025-2026	Murder Most Puzzling	Dennis Pride	3 episodes
