= Verity Rushworth =

English actress (born 1985)

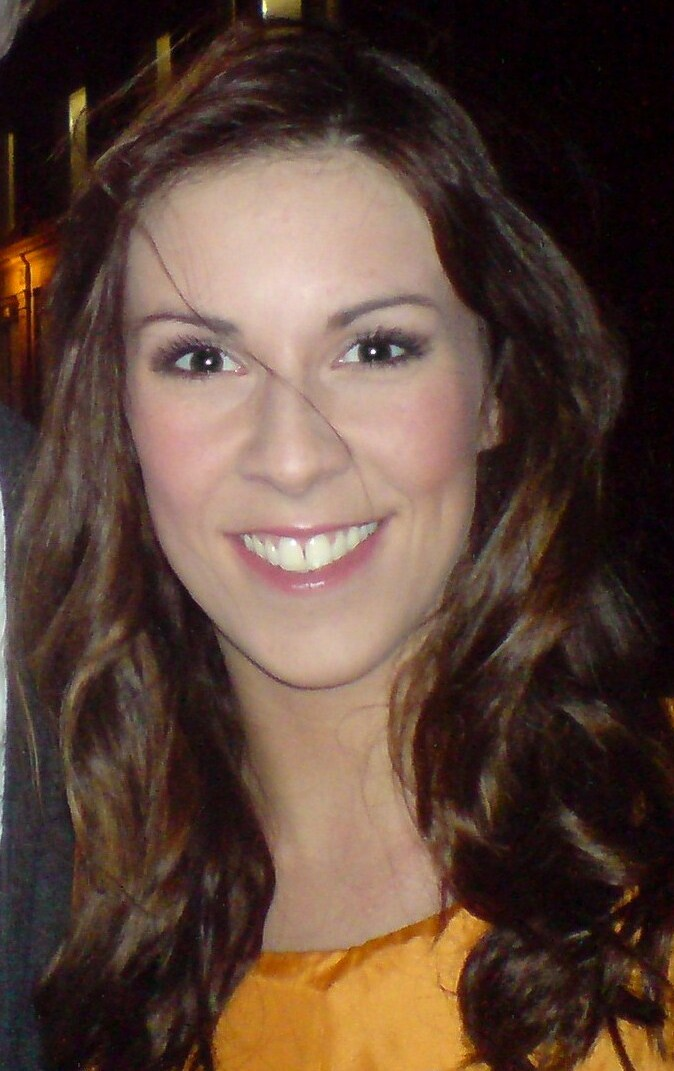
- Rushworth in April 2009
- Born: Verity Charlotte Rushworth; 15 August 1985 (age 41); Bradford, West Yorkshire, England
- Occupation: Actress
- Years active: 1997–present
- Television: Emmerdale; Doctors
- Spouse: Dominic Michael Shaw (m. 2013; div. 2021)
- Partner: Anthony Martin
- Children: 2

Verity Charlotte Rushworth (born 15 August 1985) is an English actress. She is known for playing Donna Windsor in the ITV soap opera Emmerdale from 1998 to 2009, with a guest appearance in 2014. She has played many theatre roles throughout the UK, including two leading roles in West End theatre productions. From 2020 to 2021, she appeared in the BBC medical soap opera Doctors as Lily Walker.

== Life and career ==
Rushworth attended St. Mary's Catholic High School, Menston. In 1997, Rushworth had small roles in ITV television programmes such as Heartbeat, and in 1998, at the age of 12, she took on her most notable role, Donna Windsor in the ITV soap opera Emmerdale. She took the role over from Sophie Jeffery, who played the part from 1993 to 1997. After appearing on Emmerdale for over 10 years, Rushworth filmed her final scenes at the end of 2008 which were later aired in January 2009.

From 2 February 2009, she made her West End debut in the role of Penny Pingleton in a production of Hairspray, taking over the role from Elinor Collett. Rushworth then played the leading role of Maria von Trapp in the 2011 UK tour of The Sound of Music, before taking on the role of Velma in Chicago at Curve Theatre, Leicester from November 2013 to January 2014. On 6 January 2014, it was announced that Rushworth would be returning to Emmerdale to reprise the role of Donna, after a five-year-absence. Rushworth began filming in February, and returned on screen on 19 March 2014. It was announced that she would be back as Donna for 5 months and departed on 15 August 2014. She shared the role of Holly Golightly with Pixie Lott during the 2016 tour of Breakfast at Tiffany's. She then appeared in the West End production of Kinky Boots until from 2017 to 2018. In June 2020, she began appearing in the BBC soap opera Doctors as receptionist Lily Walker, making her final appearance in February 2021.

== Filmography ==
Year	Title	Role	Notes
1997	Heartbeat	Lucy Keen	Episode: "Friendly Fire"
1998–2009, 2014, 2024	Emmerdale	Donna Windsor	Series regular; 1311 episodes
2007	Soapstar Superstar	Herself	Contestant
2007	Soapstar Superchef	Herself	Contestant
2020–2021	Doctors	Lily Walker	Recurring role

== Stage ==
- Hairspray - Penny Pingleton (2009–2010, London West End)
- Departure Lounge - Sophie (2010)
- The Sound Of Music - Maria (2011 UK Tour)
- Annie - Grace Farrel (2011, West Yorkshire Playhouse)
- Seven Year Itch - (2012, Salisbury Playhouse)
- Merrily We Roll Along (2012, Theatr Clwyd)
- Chicago - Velma (2013–2014, Curve Theatre Leicester)
- And Then There Were None - Vera Claythorne (2015 UK Tour)
- Kinky Boots - Lauren (2017–2018, London West End)

== Awards and nominations ==
Year	Award	Category	Result	Ref.
2005	Inside Soap Awards	Best Couple (shared with Mark Charnock)	Nominated	
2008	Digital Spy Soap Awards	Best On-Screen Partnership (shared with Charnock)	Nominated	
2008	The British Soap Awards	Best Actress	Nominated	
2014	Inside Soap Awards	Best Actress	Shortlisted	
2015	20th National Television Awards	Serial Drama Performance	Shortlisted	
2015	The British Soap Awards	Best Actress	Nominated	
2015	The British Soap Awards	Best On-Screen Partnership (shared with Michael Parr)	Nominated	
