= Tony Audenshaw =

English actor (born 1964)

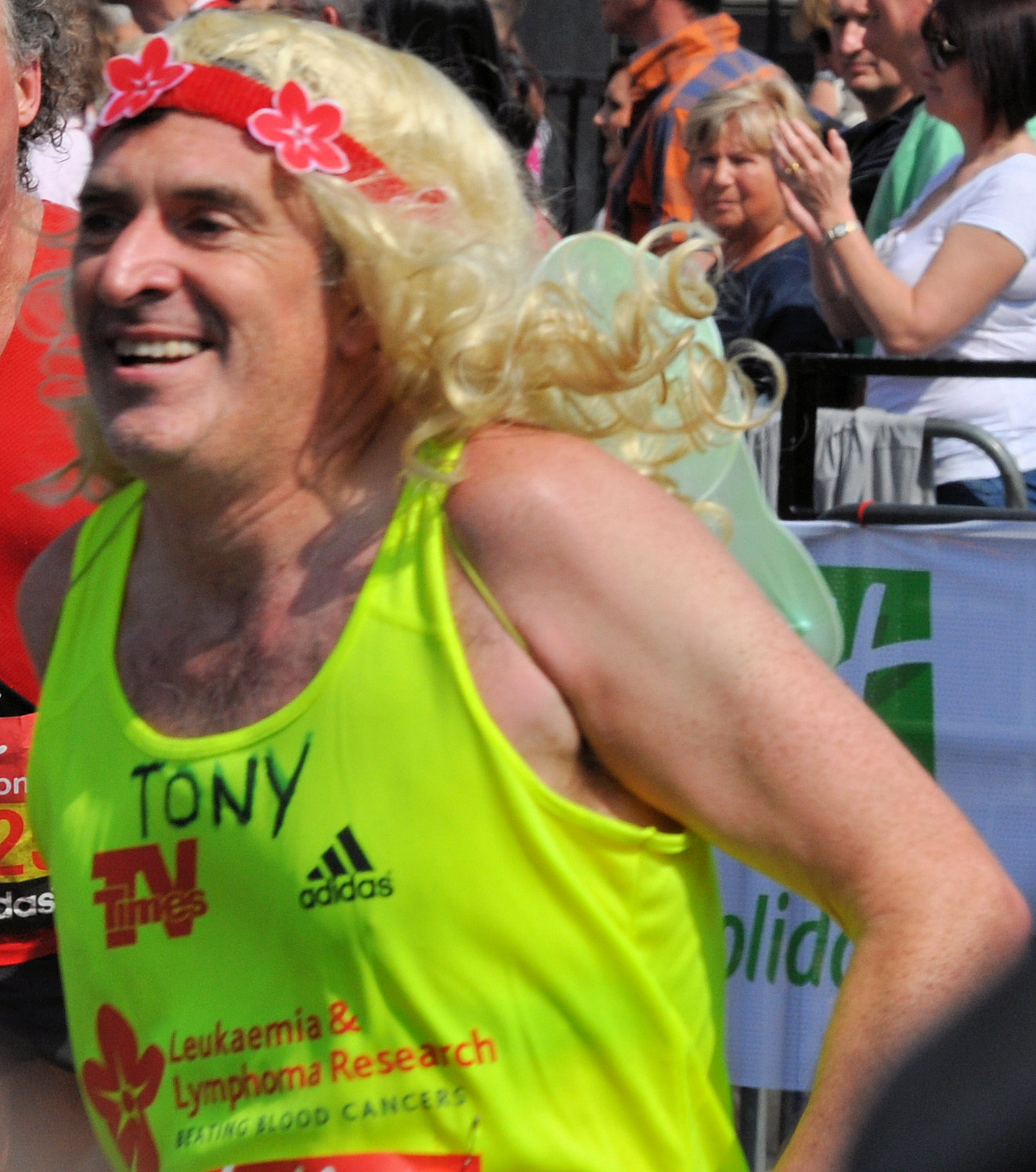
- Audenshaw in 2011
- Born: Antony Lee; 13 January 1965 (age 61); Denton, Lancashire, England
- Occupations: Actor; singer
- Years active: 1993–present
- Television: Brookside; Emmerdale
- Spouse: Ruth Audenshaw (m. 1993; died 2017)
- Children: 2

Antony Audenshaw (born 13 January 1965) is an English actor and singer. Audenshaw appeared in the Channel 4 soap opera Brookside from 1994 to 1996. Then in 2000, he began playing Bob Hope on the ITV soap opera Emmerdale. For his portrayal, he received a nomination for Most Popular Newcomer at the 7th National Television Awards. He is also frontman of the band White Van Man.

== Life and career ==
Audenshaw was born in Denton, Lancashire on 13 January 1965. In 1993, Audenshaw married wife Ruth, and the pair had two children together before her death in 2017. Audenshaw began both his acting and music careers on stage whilst performing songs and sketches that he had written, later taking part in amateur theatre productions. Whilst trying to make it as an actor, he had a job at Thorpe Park and slept in his car on the car park since he could not afford accommodation. Between 1994 and 1996, he played the recurring role of PC Ian Coban in the Channel 4 soap Brookside. His Emmerdale debut was in 1996, when he played the part of security guard Acky. He later appeared as Bob Hope in 2000 and he has been a cast member since. For his portrayal, he received a nomination for Most Popular Newcomer at the 7th National Television Awards. In December 2006, he appeared alongside other members of the Emmerdale cast on a celebrity version of the TV show Family Fortunes, and in 2009, he won an episode of Celebrity Mastermind. His specialist subject was birds.

Audenshaw has completed numerous London Marathons, and in 2010, he broke the Guinness World Record for the fastest time set by a runner dressed as a baby, when he completed the London Marathon in 3 hours and 13 minutes. He ran the Robin Hood Marathon in Nottingham on Sunday 12 September 2010 in 3 hours 54 minutes and 29 seconds. Audenshaw often runs in fancy dress for the charity Leukaemia & Lymphoma Research. On 17 April 2011, Audenshaw ran the 2011 London Marathon in 3 hours and 18 minutes dressed as a fairy. He has presented a feature called Tony's Trials on the weekly running podcast Marathon Talk. Audenshaw is the lead singer of a band called White Van Man, who released "Viva Englandia" in support of England's 2010 World Cup campaign. Since his wife died from pancreatic cancer, Audenshaw raised £4100 for Pancreatic Cancer UK on Celebrity Catchphrase in 2022.

== Filmography ==
Year	Title	Role	Notes
1993	Raining Stones		Film
1994–1996	Brookside	PC Ian Coban	Series regular
1996	Emmerdale	Acky	Recurring role
1996	Prime Suspect 5: Errors of Judgement	DC Growse	Recurring role
1996	Hillsborough		Film
1998	Hetty Wainthrop Investigates	Ray Lever	Episode: "Pursuit by Proxy"
1998	Where the Heart Is	PC Blake	Episode: "Family Matters"
1998	Heartbeat	Ian Lennon	Episode: "Hello, Goodbye"
2000	Peak Practice	Peter Castle	Episode: "Family Values"
2000	Metropolis	Locksmith	1 episode
2000	Going Off Big Time	Policeman	Film
2000–present	Emmerdale	Bob Hope	Series regular
2011	Emmerdale: Paddy and Marlon's Big Night In	Bob Hope	Guest appearance
2022	Celebrity Catchphrase	Himself	Contestant

== Awards and nominations ==
Year	Award	Category	Nominated work	Result	Ref.
2001	7th National Television Awards	Most Popular Newcomer	Emmerdale	Nominated	
2006	British Soap Awards	Best On-Screen Partnership (with Deena Payne)	Emmerdale	Nominated	
