= List of Emmerdale characters introduced in 2008 =

The following is a list of characters that first appeared in the British soap opera Emmerdale in 2008, by order of first appearance. All characters were introduced by the soap's executive producer, Keith Richardson.

== Shane Doyle ==
Shane Doyle
- Emmerdale character
- Portrayed by: Paul McEwan
- First appearance: 3 January 2008
- Last appearance: 4 December 2008
- Introduced by: Keith Richardson
In-universe information
- Occupation: Police officer

Shane Doyle, played by Paul McEwan, made his first screen appearance on 3 January 2008.

Shane was introduced as a police officer and a colleague of Donna Windsor-Dingle and Ross Kirk's. Shane constantly bullied Donna but was good friends with Ross. He bullied Donna due to her gender – a woman being in the police force – and also for being married into the Dingle family, who had a prominent criminal record. After much conflict between Shane and Donna, she decides to start a fresh. At a party she tried to start a fresh with Shane, but he misunderstood and made a pass at her. As he tried to force himself upon her she kneed him in the groin and ran to Ross Kirk's house, as Ross had seen the assault. After her close shave with Shane, she decided to file a complaint against him, but Shane had guessed what she would do and so he told the Chief Superintendent that Donna had made a pass at him. Donna decided not to go ahead in filing a complaint after discovering that Ross wouldn't back her up.

Donna's husband Marlon, after hearing what Shane did, took action by convincing his younger brother Eli to frame Shane as a corrupt officer. Eli gave Ross drugs to plant in Shane's locker, while he would report Shane to the police for possession of drugs. Ross went ahead with the plan and stashed drugs in Shane's locker. Donna found out about the plan and rushed to the station to remove the drugs from Shane's locker. Shane caught her trying to break into his locker. Donna confessed to the plan, and used it as a warning for Shane, who stayed away from Donna and the entire Dingle clan from then on. However, Shane began to notice an intimacy between Ross and Donna, and was convinced that the pair were having an affair. When a police officer came to him looking for Ross at a police comedy night, he became even more suspicious. He knocked on Donna's door claiming to be room service, and his suspicions were confirmed when he heard Ross's voice in the room also.

Shane began dating Jasmine Thomas, an undercover journalist, who was dating him to get information on his alleged connections to the criminal family The McFarlanes. Shane and Jasmine met at The Woolpack, and later met again when Shane arrived at Jasmine's boyfriend Jake Doland's house, and provokes an attack from Jake, and subsequently arrests him for drunk and disorderly, while Jasmine dumps Jake for thinking that she'd ever cheat on him. Shane asks Jasmine out on a date but she only becomes interest in him when he arrests Danielle Hutch (Nicola Stapleton), a girl with ties to The McFarlanes. Shane and Jasmine begin dating and Shane later releases Danielle, stating that he felt sorry for her. Shane and Jasmine eventually have sex, and Jasmine begins pressuring him for information on The McFarlanes. However, she is taken aback when he gets angry. She then searches her flat and discovers a large sum of cash in his wardrobe. She is then caught by Shane, and it soon transpires that Shane is in league with The McFarlanes, proving him to be a corrupt officer.

After learning of Shane's illegal activities, Jasmine attempts to flee his flat. However, he corners her and tries to force himself upon her. Jasmine's friend Debbie Dingle then arrives and knocks Shane unconscious by hitting him over the head with a chair. As Jasmine and Debbie prepare to leave, Shane regains consciousness and tries to assault Debbie. Jasmine picks up a chair leg and promptly beats Shane to death. Shaken by the recent turn of events, Debbie and Jasmine enlist the help of Eli Dingle and they dump Shane's body in the lake. Jasmine then uses Shane's credit card to buy a plane ticket out of England, but she begins having nightmares.

In January 2009, Shane's body is found by Victoria Sugden when she falls through the frozen over lake, and his body eventually resurfaces. Ross Kirk is initially arrested for his murder but it is Debbie who is wrongly imprisoned. Eventually Jasmine returns and hands herself into the police for Shane's murder.

== Cindy Bunton ==
Cindy Burton
- Emmerdale character
- Portrayed by: Tiffany Chapman
- First appearance: 5 February 2008
- Last appearance: 17 March 2008
- Introduced by: Keith Richardson
In-universe information
- Occupation: Actress

Cindy Bunton, portrayed by former Brookside actress Tiffany Chapman, is an actress employed by Donald De Souza (Michael Jayston). She first appeared on 5 February 2008. Following Donald leaving hospital after a brain haemorrhage, Cindy is hired to look after him while he recovers. However, Donald hires Cindy to annoy his wife Nicola (Nicola King), who he knows has had an affair with David Metcalfe (Matthew Wolfenden), who flirts with Cindy himself, much to Nicola's irritation.

After a few weeks, Nicola learns the true nature of Cindy's employment. She tries her best to use Cindy in her plan to kill Donald. This includes one attempt where Cindy takes pills meant for Donald in a set-up where Cindy would have taken the blame. When Donald learns all this, he makes Nicola leave his house. Cindy, meanwhile, leaves the village as she is no longer needed by Donald and is keen to move on. She departed on 17 March 2008.

== Charlie Sellers ==
Charlie Sellers
- Emmerdale character
- Portrayed by: Michael Keogh
- First appearance: 8 January 2008
- Last appearance: 18 March 2008
- Introduced by: Keith Richardson

Charlie Sellers, portrayed by Michael Keogh, is a cellmate of Andy Sugden. He first appears on 8 January 2008 when Andy Sugden is sent to prison for the arson attack which killed his adoptive mother Sarah Sugden. He makes Andy's life a misery, and Andy attacks him after he suggests Andy's wife Jo could be having an affair without him.

When Charlie is released, he begins harassing Jo. On 7 March, he moves into Jo and Andy's farm, threatening Jo if she tells anyone. Jo eventually works with Debbie Dingle and Chas Dingle to get rid of him. They convince Brenda McFarlane to help them. Jo convinces Charlie to steal from a club owned by the McFarlanes, a local family of criminals, with Chas helping him. The idea is that Charlie will get caught by the police while Chas escapes. However, Charlie holds the bar manager hostage at gunpoint, and both escape. Mrs. McFarlane later appears with a 'heavy' and demands the stolen money back. She tells him to leave and never return and he has no choice but to agree.

== Joe Jacobs ==
Joe Jacobs
- Emmerdale character
- Portrayed by: John Woodvine
- First appearance: 20 February 2008
- Last appearance: 20 May 2008
- Introduced by: Keith Richardson
In-universe information
- Occupation: Retired Naval captain

Joe Jacobs, portrayed by John Woodvine, is an old friend of Sandy Thomas (Freddie Jones). He first appeared on 20 February 2008. Soon after arriving, he flirts with Betty Eagleton (Paula Tilbrook), who Sandy had got close to. Months later he reappears when Betty and Pearl Ladderbanks (Meg Johnson) try speed dating at the Woolpack. Pearl quickly gets fond of Joe but she thinks his affection is only because she has a spare ticket for a cruise she has won. Pearl chooses to take Lily Butterfield (Anne Charleston) on the cruise, but Joe drops a suitcase on her foot as he thinks she is being too demanding. Pearl then chooses Joe to go with her on the cruise and he tells her how fond of her he is. When Pearl returns from the cruise without Joe, she reluctantly tells her friends that he had been kicked off the cruise for rude behaviour.

== Adele Allfrey ==
Adele Allfrey
- Emmerdale character
- Portrayed by: Tanya Vital
- Duration: 2008–2010
- First appearance: 11 August 2008
- Last appearance: 5 October 2010
- Introduced by: Keith Richardson
In-universe information
- Occupation: Factory worker

Adele Allfrey was a worker at Sharma and Sharma sweet factory. She appeared from 2008 to 2010, and was played by Tanya Vital.

After Eric Pollard's staff go on strike, he places an advert for more staff. After having an interview, Adele is given a job along with Leyla Harding. Adele gets on well with the other workers and joins them in playing practical jokes on their supervisor, Lexi King. One day, Adele does not show up for work, and Lexi tells them she had fired Adele as a warning to everyone else to keep their focus on their job. The next day, they learn Adele had actually taken leave to help her sick mother, and she soon returns to work. She loses her job in July 2009 when Eric closes the factory due to a loss in business. She then got her current job at the new sweet factory when it opened in Emmerdale in the summer of 2009.

In the summer of 2010, Adele had a brief fling with Andy Sugden, but the romance was cut short when his ex-wife and Adele's friend Katie admitted having sex with him. Katie's betrayal then prompted Adele to quit her job and leave the village.

== Bonnie Drinkwater ==
Bonnie Drinkwater
- Emmerdale character
- Portrayed by: Sue Jenkins
- First appearance: 25 August 2008
- Last appearance: 29 August 2008
- Introduced by: Keith Richardson

Bonnie Drinkwater is a holiday friend of Val Pollard. She appeared in 2008.

She arrives in Emmerdale, having met Val in Cancún, Mexico, and her stories of her and Val's drunken holiday antics soon annoy Val but interest Val's husband Eric, who Bonnie starts to flirt with. Val then spends more and more time with Bonnie to keep her away from Eric. After a few days, Bonnie tells Val that during the holiday, Val had sex with a much younger man called Derek, a name she has tattooed on her back, although Val does not remember this. Val then feels blackmailed because if she tells Bonnie to leave the village, she fears she will tell Eric of her affair. Later that day, she gets drunk with Doug Potts, whose wife had just said she wanted a divorce, and she tells him to start living his life, causing him to buy a very expensive car the following day.

Val's son, Paul Lambert, orders Bonnie to ring her daughter so she can leave, but later discovers that she rung the Talking Clock. Bonnie then confesses that she has no daughter, and is a spinster who lives in a one-bedroom flat in Barnsley, and Val is her only friend. She had also made up Val having sex with Derek. Seeing her as a pathetic, clinger-on, Paul tells her to leave the village. Shortly after she drives away in Doug's car, and then spends the night with him at the Vicarage. The following day he tries to get rid of her, but is only successful when Ashley Thomas tells her that if she is to stay at the Vicarage it will have to be in separate rooms and with no alcohol. It is later revealed Doug had contracted crabs from Bonnie.

== Danielle Hutch ==
Danielle Hutch
- Emmerdale character
- Portrayed by: Nicola Stapleton
- Duration: 2008–2009
- First appearance: 23 September 2008
- Last appearance: 3 March 2009
- Introduced by: Keith Richardson

Danielle Hutch, played by Nicola Stapleton is a friend of Eli Dingle. Stapleton's casting was announced a month ahead of her arrival. Danielle is introduced as a friend of Eli Dingle (Joseph Gilgun) from his past and described as a "streetwise Londoner". In an interview with Digital Spy, Stapleton said: "Danielle is such an intriguing character because there's more to her than meets the eye. "I'm really looking forward to starting filming and I think viewers can expect some interesting encounters as we explore the relationship between Danielle and Eli." Series producer Anita Turner added: "I'm so pleased to welcome an actress with Nicola's calibre to the show. Eli likes to manipulate people, but Danielle is a different proposition and she'll definitely get under his skin."

Danielle first appears in when Eli nearly runs her over on a road near the village. They previously knew each other, and had been romantically involved. She stays at the Dingles' house overnight, but Debbie soon finds her with cocaine in her bag. She is later arrested when caught by PC Shane Doyle and taken to London.

Danielle reappears in November when she is spotted working for the McFarlanes, a local criminal family, who paid Doyle to work for them. She warns Jasmine Thomas, who is trying to do some investigative journalism, to stay away from Shane and the McFarlanes. Danielle also helps the Dingles rescue Aaron Livesy from the McFarlanes' house. In February 2009, Danielle arrives in the same prison wing as Debbie Dingle, who has been charged with murdering Shane Doyle. When Eli visits, she explains that after helping the Dingles, the McFarlanes set her up by planting things on her. Eli persuades Danielle to have a fight with Debbie, so they both get sent to hospital. The following week, Eli and Marlon dress up and knock out the officers guarding Debbie and Danielle. Debbie refuses to go with them, but Danielle escapes. However, the following day, the police catch her just as her bus is about to depart.

== Andrew Drake ==
Andrew Drake
- Emmerdale character
- Portrayed by: Steven Hillman
- Duration: 2008–2009
- First appearance: 21 October 2008
- Last appearance: 30 January 2009
- Introduced by: Keith Richardson
In-universe information
- Occupation: Police sergeant

Sergeant Andrew Drake, portrayed by Steven Hillman, is a police officer who first appeared on 21 October 2008. He decides not to discipline PCs Donna Windsor-Dingle (Verity Rushworth) and Charlotte Beecham (Emma Hartley-Miller) when they break into PC Shane Doyle's (Paul McEwan) flat when he goes missing. Shortly after, he is put in charge of the investigation into Doyle's disappearance by Charles Vaughan (Richard Cole). This investigation soon ends when Shane's body is found on 30 December 2008.

In late January, Drake tries to persuade Donna not to accept a transfer, but is unable to convince her to stay. He makes his final appearance on 30 January 2009.

== Mick Naylor ==
Mick Naylor
- Emmerdale character
- Portrayed by: Tony Haygarth
- Duration: 2008–2009
- First appearance: 3 November 2008
- Last appearance: 12 June 2009
- Introduced by: Keith Richardson
In-universe information
- Occupation: Farm hand
- Wife: Carol Naylor
- Grandsons: Lee Naylor

Mick Naylor is a farm hand who later works in the Woolpack. He appeared from 2008 to 2009.

He first appears on 3 November 2008 when he visits Jo Sugden at Butlers Farm. He complains that her broken fence has caused cows to go onto his boss' farm. Mick then demands compensation after it is discovered that Sam Dingle sold some of Mick's cows by accident. The following day, Mick returns with his grandson Lee and they soon fix their differences. In the following weeks, Mick and Lee help Jo out on the farm following her separation from abusive husband Andy. Jo and Lee start to get on well, and in mid-December Mick warns Lee not to spend too much time flirting with her. By late December, with Lee's help, Jo has decided to sell off most of the farm and leave Emmerdale. With Lee helping her, everything goes fine until Mick turns up. Jo locks him in the barn so he cannot stop her from leaving. He is not discovered until the following morning.

In February 2009, Diane Sugden pays Mick to help Andy out on the farm, although Andy is not keen on this. When Andy decides to leave the farm, Mick asks Natasha Wylde if he can lease the farm off her. She agrees to this on a temporary basis. However, before this can be formalised Andy changes his mind and decides to keep the farm. The following day Diane offers him a job in the Woolpack, which he accepts. In April, he admits to poaching from the Home Farm estate, and setting a trap that trapped Lee's foot, causing him to be rushed to hospital. Later that month he leaves the Woolpack to start helping at the farm again, after Val Pollard asked Andy to employ as she was getting annoyed with him. In May, he becomes homeless after getting into debt with his rent. He moves into Emmerdale's B&B. In June, as Andy begins to suffer a mental breakdown, he pays less and less attention to the farm. Mick, frustrated with the pointless attempts to keep Andy going, quits, and gets a job in Robblesfield.

== Lee Naylor ==
Lee Naylor
- Emmerdale character
- Portrayed by: Lewis Linford
- Duration: 2008–2009
- First appearance: 4 November 2008
- Last appearance: 18 June 2009
- Introduced by: Keith Richardson
In-universe information
- Occupation: Gamekeeper
- Grandfathers: Mick Naylor
- Grandmothers: Carol Naylor

Lee Naylor played by Lewis Linford is the grandson of Mick Naylor. He appeared from 2008 to 2009.

Lee first appears on 4 November 2008, when he accompanies his grandfather to Butler's Farm – run by Jo Sugden – to sort out a problem over cattle. Over the following weeks, Mick and Lee help Jo out with the farm, which she is struggling to run after separating from her abusive husband Andy. Lee is a qualified gamekeeper. He and Jo get on well from the start, and when in mid-December 2008, he has to remove his shirt after fixing some plumbing, Mick warns him not to flirt with Jo too much. In late December, Lee catches Andy sabotaging the washing machine so Jo will ask him over to do the repair. They get into a fight, and Andy is thrown out. Jo decides she needs to leave the village, and Lee agrees to help her. She leaves on 22 December.

In February 2009, Lee is made Home Farm's gamekeeper by Natasha Wylde. He soon takes an interest in Katie Sugden, but Nathan Wylde is also interested in Katie and he tries to stop him seeing her. In April, Lee is rushed to hospital after Natasha and Mark find him on the estate having got his foot caught in a poacher's trap. Mick later admits he was the poacher, and Lee is soon sacked by Nathan when Lee punches him after he taunts him about his grandfather. Soon after Nathan rehires him after Katie persuades him to do so. In May, he becomes homeless after Mick's gets into debt with the rent. After sleeping on the grounds for a few nights, he moves to Katie's house.

Tension continues to simmer between Nathan and Lee. In mid-June Lee has a further argument with Nathan over Katie, and is sacked. This time, however, Lee does not want his job back. When Katie learns that Lee told Nathan about some of her private conversations, she orders him to move out. Lee, already planning to apply for a gamekeeper job elsewhere, packs his bags that day and leaves the village.

== Pam Montclare ==
Pam Montclare
- Emmerdale character
- Portrayed by: Catherine Rabett
- Duration: 2008–2009
- First appearance: 26 December 2008
- Last appearance: 27 January 2009
- Introduced by: Keith Richardson
In-universe information
- Husband: Richard Montclare

Pamela Montclare has a brief affair with Rodney Blackstock. She appeared from 2008 to 2009.

Pam arrives in Emmerdale with her husband Richard for a Boxing Day shoot at Home Farm. She and Rodney Blackstock soon get on well, and are just about to have sex in Rodney's house when Jamie Hope arrives. They just about tidy themselves up before Richard arrives. They return to the village the following week for another shoot, and stay in Rodney's cottage for the first night. When her husband has gone to bed, Pam shares a kiss with Rodney before joining her husband. The following day, while Richard is on a shoot, she and Rodney have sex. When Shadrach Dingle suggests this to Richard, he goes to the B&B, and although Rodney just has time to escape, Pam cannot hide they have been together. They both then leave the village. However, Pam and Rodney continue their affair and Pam visits the village again on 27 January. They are about to go to his bedroom, when Paul and Diane arrive telling Rodney he cannot have an affair with his heart condition. Pam then quickly leaves, not wanting to be put in that situation. Rodney then explains to Paul and Diane he does not have a heart condition, it was made up by Val Lambert as a ploy to keep Paul in the village.

== Richard Montclare ==
Richard Montclare
- Emmerdale character
- Portrayed by: Dominic Jephcott
- Duration: 2008–2009
- First appearance: 26 December 2008
- Last appearance: 8 January 2009
- Introduced by: Keith Richardson
In-universe information
- Wife: Pam Montclare

Richard Montclare stays in Emmerdale for a shoot. He appeared from 2008 to 2009.

He arrives in the village with his wife Pam for a Boxing Day shoot at Home Farm. Pam and Rodney Blackstock soon get on well, and unbeknown to Richard he narrowly avoids walking in on them about to have sex. They return to the village the following week for another shoot, and stay in Rodney's cottage for the first night as the B&B is full. The following day Richard is on a shoot while Pam stays at the B&B. When Shadrach Dingle suggests she and Rodney maybe having sex, Richard rushes to the B&B with his shot gun. While trying to fight past Jamie Hope to get up the stairs, Richard accidentally shoots Jimmy King – who is trying to find Rodney because he has just discovered the illegal shoot – in the behind. Richard and Pam then leave the village. The following day, Richard returns when Jimmy demands thousands of pounds in compensation in return for not telling the police.

== Nick Henshall ==
Nick Henshall
- Emmerdale character
- Portrayed by: Michael McKell
- Duration: 2008–2011
- First appearance: 31 December 2008
- Last appearance: 17 February 2011
- Introduced by: Keith Richardson
In-universe information
- Occupation: Detective
- Wife: Alison Henshall (until 1998)

Detective Sergeant Nicholas "Nick" Henshall, played by Michael McKell, was a local police officer. He made his first appearance on 31 December 2008. He returned in 2010 and began a relationship with Katie Sugden and started a fire that killed two people. He departed on 17 February 2011 when he killed himself.

In January 2011, McKell told Inside Soap that Henshall did not intend for anyone to be hurt by the fire he started. The fire claimed the lives of Terry Woods (Billy Hartman) and Viv Hope (Deena Payne). McKell revealed that Henshall's wife, Alison, was killed in a fire that was intended for him. He could not rescue his wife and uses the fire at Victoria Cottage as a way to make amends. McKell said "Because he felt powerless to help, he invested his life in his career and actually became a very good cop in the process. When he set alight Katie's cottage, he only wanted to start a little fire so he could be a hero and she'd need him." Henshall later became unstable and a hostage situation occurred between him and Katie (Sammy Winward).

Detective Constable Henshall is first seen when he and DS Karen Williams (Annie Fitzmaurice) investigate the murder of policeman Shane Doyle (Paul McEwan) and they initially arrest Eli Dingle (Joseph Gilgun) for the murder and he implicates Debbie Dingle (Charley Webb) and Jasmine Thomas (Jenna-Louise Coleman) as being Shane's killers and Henshall and Williams arrest and charge Debbie with the murder. However, Jasmine later hands herself in and confesses to Henshall and Williams that she killed Shane. Henshall investigates the disappearance of Will Wylde (Oscar Lloyd) and later questions Cain Dingle (Jeff Hordley) about a break-in. He is promoted to Detective Sergeant and returns to investigate the murder of Mark Wylde (Maxwell Caulfield). He and DC Laura Prior initially arrest Nathan Wylde (Lyndon Ogbourne), but release him without charge due to a lack of evidence. They then arrest and charge Ryan Lamb (James Sutton) with the murder, but Natasha Wylde (Amanda Donohoe) is proven to be the killer and Henshall is present when she is arrested. Henshall investigates the theft of two horses from Home Farm and he later buys stable manager, Katie Sugden a drink. Katie's ex-husband, Andy Sugden (Kelvin Fletcher) is not happy with Katie dating Henshall and they goad each other. Henshall investigates the disappearance of Jacob Gallagher (Joe Warren-Plant) and he suggests to Jacob's parents Alicia (Natalie Anderson) and Justin (Andrew Langtree) that they hold a televised appeal. David Metcalfe (Matthew Wolfenden) eventually finds Jacob in an old building and rescues him, despite Henshall telling him to wait.

Katie and her housemates, Gennie Walker (Sian Reese-Williams) and Chas Dingle (Lucy Pargeter), receive prank calls and they are later burgled. Gennie tells Henshall that she thinks Andy may be responsible. On a date with Katie, Henshall mentions his dead wife, Alison. When they get back to Katie's, Henshall argues with Andy in the street and she decides to end their relationship. Later, Henshall returns with a petrol can and starts a fire at the back of Victoria Cottage. He tries to ring Katie, but she does not answer and he assumes that she has gone out. Henshall hides and watches as Carl King (Tom Lister), Andy and other residents try to put the fire out. The fire spreads and kills Terry Woods and Viv Hope when the Post Office catches alight. Henshall returns the following morning to investigate the fire with Prior and they interview both Andy and Carl. In the coming weeks, Katie and Henshall get back together. Henshall attends both Terry's funeral and Viv's memorial service at The Woolpack. Andy makes a complaint about Henshall harassing him and reveals his relationship with Katie to his colleague Prior. Henshall is then taken off the case and he blames Prior for ruining his chances of promotion. Henshall threatens Andy by holding his face over a gas cooker in his caravan. Henshall and Gennie go to Butler's Farm after Brenda Walker (Lesley Dunlop) goes to confront Andy. When they arrive, they discover that Brenda crashed her car into Andy's caravan. Henshall talks to Andy's landlords John (James Thornton) and Moira Barton (Natalie J. Robb) and they agree not to press charges.

Henshall's colleague DC Laura Prior (Elaine Glover) warns him to stay away from the case and that she knows that he withheld information from Katie and Carl's statements. On Valentine's Day, Henshall takes Katie for a meal at the B&B and tells her that he is falling in love with her. Andy arrives with Alicia to watch them and Henshall demands that he leave. Henshall asks his colleague DC Darren Foster for updates on the case and Foster tells Henshall that they have CCTV footage from the shop where the phone used to make the calls to Victoria Cottage was bought from. Henshall asks Katie to come away with him and she agrees. At his home, Katie finds some newspaper clippings about his wife Alison's death. Katie asks Henshall about them and he tells her that Alison died in an arson attack on their home. Katie discovers her stolen bracelet and Henshall locks the front door and starts to barricade the house. Katie realises that he is responsible for the prank phone calls, the burglary and the fire. Henshall tells Katie that he tried to save his wife and that it was his fault she died as their home was targeted by some criminals he had arrested and imprisoned. He tells her that he wanted to make up for Alison's death and that he wanted her to need him, so he started the fire at her home in order for him to rescue her. Henshall insists that Terry and Viv's deaths were accidental. Katie demands that he let her go but he refuses, telling her that he loves her and insists that she loves him. Katie tries to escape, but Henshall stops her. Prior and Foster call round to question Henshall after discovering he is responsible for starting the fire and realise that Katie is in the house. Prior calls Katie's phone and Henshall answers and shows them Katie at the window to prove she is alive. He produces a gun and Katie begs him not to use it and he suggests killing them both in order for them to be together. A shot is fired and Katie leaves the house. She tells Prior and Andy, who had arrived at the scene with Gennie, that Henshall has killed himself.

== Other characters ==
Date(s)	Character	Actor	Circumstances
10 January-5 February	Nick Barrie	Sam Kane	The ex-boyfriend of Carrie Nicholls, who offers her a job and new life in Canada. Having grown dissatisfied with life in the village, Carrie is eager to go and start a new life. However, her daughter, Scarlett Nicholls does not want to leave, partly because of her relationship with Daz Eden. Carrie turns down Nick's offer, but he can not stay away and they soon resumed their relationship. Nick and Carrie subsequently leave Emmerdale for Canada and marry in Thailand with her daughters, Scarlett and Lexi King present.
28 October	Jonty DeLorean	Mark Little	Jonty is a friend of Louise Appleton (Emily Symons). When Louise's boyfriend, Jamie Hope (Alex Carter) sees them exchange kisses, he confronts them. Jonty quickly explains that he is helping Louise manage her modelling career and she and Jonty leave for Australia.
November-1 December	Gary McFarlane	Colin Connor	The owner of the night club where Jasmine Thomas briefly works, unbeknownst to him as an undercover journalist. He is a member of the criminal McFarlane family.
