= List of Emmerdale characters introduced in 2006 =

The following is a list of characters that first appeared in the British soap opera Emmerdale in 2006, by order of first appearance. All characters were introduced by the soap's executive producer, Keith Richardson.

== Samson Dingle ==
Samson Dingle
- Emmerdale character
- Portrayed by: Bradley Milnes (2006–2008); Ben Shooter (2006–2008); Charlie Pell (2008–2010); Sam Hall (2009–2024)
- Duration: 2006–2024
- First appearance: 12 January 2006
- Last appearance: 6 August 2024
- Introduced by: Keith Richardson
- Spin-off appearances: Emmerdale: The Dingles - For Richer for Poorer (2010)
In-universe information
- Father: Sam Dingle
- Mother: Alice Dingle
- Stepmother: Lydia Dingle
- Daughters: Esther Spencer
- Grandfathers: Zak Dingle
- Grandmothers: Nellie Dingle
- Uncles: Cain Dingle
- Aunts: Belle Dingle
- First cousins: Debbie Dingle; Nate Robinson; Kyle Dingle; Isaac Dingle; Vinny Dingle
- Other relatives: Charity Dingle; Noah Dingle; Chas Dingle; Aaron Dingle; Gennie Walker; Shadrach Dingle; Marlon Dingle; Eli Dingle; Moses Dingle; Sarah Sugden

Samson Dingle, played by Sam Hall, is the son of Sam (James Hooton) and Alice Dingle (Ursula Holden-Gill). He has appeared since January 2006. The character has also been played by other actors in the past, one being Ben Shooter, who was controversially sacked in 2008 for "crying on set". Following this, Shooter's mother Emma slammed producer Anita Turner and claimed that he was treated like a "prop" and that he had to film "horrifying" scenes.

After discovering she is pregnant, Alice falls ill with cancer. She is advised to terminate the pregnancy to start chemotherapy immediately, but she refuses to abort. She gives birth prematurely via a caesarean section, and her son is named Samson. After stopping her chemotherapy because it is not working, Alice dies. After Alice's death, Sam vows to bring up Samson on his own and moves into his own cottage. However, he finds it difficult to cope and someone calls social services. Samson is knocked down by Val Pollard (Charlie Hardwick) in her jeep. He soon recovers, but Sam goes on the run with Samson because he is worried he will be taken away from him. An arrangement is later made and Sam is allowed to keep Samson. He later moves back in with Sam and the Dingle family.

It became known that Amelia Spencer (Daisy Campbell) was pregnant and that Samson was the father. In October 2022, Esther Spencer was born and although Samson by no means wanted no part in this, he started to come to his senses and helped Amelia for their baby.

In 2024, it was announced that Sam Hall would be leaving the role of Samson Dingle after fifteen years. In June 2024, Samson ended up befriending a boy called Josh Cope (Osian Morgan), who was transphobic. He ended up being stabbed by Matty Barton (Ash Palmisciano), who was holding a knife whilst chopping fruits, after Josh pushed Samson into him. Rumours had speculated that Samson was going to be killed off, however Hall confirmed this was not the case. Hall told Inside Soap, "well, I don't want to give too much away, but Samson has some really big stuff coming up. However, don't worry, as he's definitely not being killed off! There are some good stories coming up for him, and I was very excited when I read the scripts." Hall also said he "enjoys playing the 'mean' side of Samson, even while his 'good side' tends to shine through." Hall continued, "Like with the baby storyline, he was worrying about Amelia being okay for Esther because Samson obviously lost his mum – and he didn't want his kid to grow up without a mum. So, he can get angry, but his intentions are always right in the end."

== Vonda Lockhart ==
Vonda Lockhart
- Emmerdale character
- Portrayed by: Lorelei King
- Duration: 2006–2007
- First appearance: 16 February 2006
- Last appearance: 2 May 2007
- Introduced by: Keith Richardson
In-universe information
- Occupation: Show dancer
- Husband: Bob Hope (backstory)
- Daughters: Roxy Lockhart

Vonda Lockhart (also Hope) is Bob Hope's (Tony Audenshaw) ex-wife. Bob and Vonda, a show dancer in Las Vegas, met in 1994 on a cruise and drunkenly got married aboard the ship. They divorced after the cruise. Unknown to Bob, Vonda fell pregnant and gave birth to Roxy (Chloe Procter), his fifth child.

In 2006, when Bob is planning to remarry Viv (Deena Payne) she wants to have all of his children there. They find out about Roxy, and she and Vonda come to the village for the wedding. In 2007, Vonda and Roxy return to the village when the former is doing a tour of Northern England decides that Roxy should spend some time with Bob.

== Roxy Lockhart ==
Roxy Lockhart
- Emmerdale character
- Portrayed by: Chloe Procter
- Duration: 2006–2007
- First appearance: 16 February 2006
- Last appearance: 2 May 2007
- Introduced by: Keith Richardson
In-universe information
- Father: Bob Hope
- Mother: Vonda Lockhart
- Stepmother: Viv Hope
- Half-brothers: Jamie Hope; Josh Hope; Heath Hope
- Half-sisters: Dawn Woods; Carly Hope; Cathy Hope
- Uncles: Eddie Hope
- Nephews: T.J. Woods; Billy Hope

Roxy Lockhart is the daughter of Bob Hope (Tony Audenshaw). She appeared in 2006 and 2007.

Bob does not know of Roxy's existence until near the time of his second marriage to Viv (Deena Payne) when Viv wants to have all his children there. He had married Roxy's mother Vonda (Lorelei King) when they were drunk on a cruise and they got a quick divorce. Vonda later gave birth without Bob knowing. Vonda and Roxy only stay for Bob's wedding. Roxy has done many beauty pageants back home in America.

The following year, Vonda is employed to tour in the North of England, and decides that Bob and Roxy should spend some time together while she is working. However, Bob spends too much time with his new born twins, Cathy (Gabrielle Dowling) and Heath (Sebastian Dowling), and forgets to feed Roxy. When he does, she begins choking and Jimmy King (Nick Miles) performs the Heimlich Manoeuvre on Roxy and saves her. Vonda arrives after this and accuses Bob of being a neglectful father. They leave shortly after and Bob gives Roxy a bracelet that belonged to his late daughter, Roxy's half-sister Dawn (Julia Mallam). Roxy returns to the village for Cathy and Heath's christening and is asked to be Cathy's godmother. She is annoyed, however, that she is not the only godmother and after Bob flees the church, she tells him he is a loser. Vonda and Roxy then leave Emmerdale. Bob visits Roxy in 2008 as the two have since made up.

== Owen Hartbourne ==
Owen Hartbourne
- Emmerdale character
- Portrayed by: Oliver Lee
- Duration: 2006–2007
- First appearance: 25 January 2006
- Last appearance: 28 May 2007
- Introduced by: Keith Richardson
In-universe information
- Father: Frank Bernard Hartbourne
- Mother: Fay Bolton
- Half-sisters: Nadine Hartbourne
- Grandmothers: Pearl Ladderbanks

Owen Hartbourne is the grandson of Pearl Ladderbanks (Meg Johnson). He appeared in 2006 and 2007.

Owen - who lives in Hong Kong - arrives in the village looking for his father, Frank Bernard (Rob Parry). Pearl lies and tells him he is dead. However, when Owen wants to visit his grave, Pearl has to tell him that is father is alive but has been in prison for rape. Owen returns in May 2007 to help Pearl deal with the death of Len Reynolds (Peter Martin). Pearl joins him in 2020. Four years latter, Owen sends Paddy Dingle (Dominic Brunt) and Rhona Goskirk (Zoe Henry) a letter telling them that Pearl has died.

== Alasdair Sinclair ==
Alasdair Sinclair
- Emmerdale character
- Portrayed by: Ray Coulthard
- Duration: 2006, 2008
- First appearance: 2 March 2006
- Last appearance: 1 January 2008
- Introduced by: Keith Richardson
In-universe information
- Occupation: Businessperson
- Father: Raymond Sinclair
- Mother: Rosemary King
- Stepfather: Tom King (2006)
- Brothers: Grayson Sinclair
- Wife: Sadie Sinclair (2006–present)
- Nephews: Baby Hyde-Sinclair
- First cousins: Lord Alex Oakwell

Alasdair Charles Sinclair is Grayson Sinclair's (Christopher Villiers) brother. He first appears in early 2006 as the fiancé of Sadie King (Patsy Kensit). His mother, Rosemary (Linda Thorson), tries to persuade him not to marry her but to no avail. On the wedding day, Sadie's ex-brother-in-law, Matthew King (Matt Healy) gatecrashes the wedding. The wedding goes ahead, but Sadie soon leaves Alasdair for Matthew.

Alasdair returns to the village several times, including for his mother's engagement to Tom King (Kenneth Farrington) but returns to Dubai for work. On New Year's Day 2008, he returns for Rosemary's funeral. This is Alasdair's last appearance.

== Beryl and Barney Chugspoke ==
Beryl and Barney Chugspoke
- Emmerdale character
- Portrayed by: Georgina Hale (Beryl); David Huw Thomas (Barney)
- First appearance: 9 June 2006
- Last appearance: 21 June 2006
- Introduced by: Keith Richardson

Beryl and Barney Chugspoke, played by Georgina Hale and David Huw Thomas, respectively made their first appearance on 9 June 2006. The Chugspokes' casting was announced on 12 May 2006, a month before their debut. The duo were originally conceived as a married couple but were referred to as siblings when their first episode aired. Hale and Edwards were contracted for eight episodes. A writer from Inside Soap described the Chugspokes as a "pair of wasters" An Emmerdale spokesperson said: "We're delighted to have Georgina on board. This is a very funny storyline - viewers are in for a treat!"

Barney and Beryl arrive in Emmerdale after their campervan breaks down outside of Wishing Well Cottage and ask Lisa Dingle (Jane Cox) to fix it. However, the pair soon begin to outstay their welcome with their behaviour and ingratitude. Shadrach Dingle (Andy Devine) devises a plan to get rid of them by faking a hurt leg when they go out truffle hunting and frames them for stealing Belle's pet pig, Petal. A row ensues between Lisa and Beryl and the Chugspokes are ordered to leave.

== Ray Stead ==
Ray Stead
- Emmerdale character
- Portrayed by: Josh Moran
- Duration: 2006–2007
- First appearance: 23 June 2006
- Last appearance: 15 June 2007
- Introduced by: Keith Richardson
In-universe information
- Occupation: Bookie

Ray Stead is the owner of a chain of bookmakers. In June 2006, Pearl Ladderbanks, an old friend of his, visits one of his shops. After a horse she bets on wins, Ray convinces her to place further bets, it leaves her in a lot of debt. A few days later, Ray turns up in the village to see Pearl, but she isn't in and is greeted by her partner Len Reynolds. Ray tells Len that Pearl owes him £600, which Len offers to pay, and says that he has a couple of weeks to pay.

A year later, Marlon Dingle visits another of Ray's shops when he decides to secretly bet all £3,000 he received from the sale of building materials to win £20,000 he and his wife Donna need for a deposit. Marlon's horse wins, but Ray rips him off by eating the betting slip, leaving him with nothing. Marlon tells his furious brother Eli about the debacle. Marlon vows to get the money back and Eli decides to help him out, as long as Marlon follows his plan. Marlon and Eli turn up to do the job at the bookies in a stolen car, but Marlon is horrified when Eli reveals that he's brought a gun. Eli threatens Ray and is almost successful when a customer walks in and a struggle ensures. Marlon walks in to see Eli threatening Ray and a customer with the gun and he tries to grab the weapon. But the gun goes off and Marlon is left in a pool of blood, as he urges Eli to run for the door. Ray and the customer ring for an ambulance and Marlon is rushed to hospital. A few days later, Ray, believing Marlon was preventing the robbery and feeling guilty for his actions, turns up at the hospital to give him his winnings.

== Dr Josephine Abbott ==
Josephine Abbott
- Emmerdale character
- Portrayed by: Kate Maravan
- Duration: 2006, 2008–2013
- First appearance: 26 July 2006
- Last appearance: 9 August 2013
- Introduced by: Keith Richardson (2006); Steve Frost (2012)
In-universe information
- Occupation: Doctor

Dr Josephine Abbott, played by Kate Maravan, is a local GP who first appeared in 2006, introduced by then-series producer, Kathleen Beedles. She continues to appear in the show, whenever a character visits her at her surgery, which is presumably in Hotton. She first appears when Jasmine Thomas visits her after she is too unwell to attend the funeral of Dawn Woods. Dr Abbott tells Jasmine that she is pregnant, but Jasmine doesn't believe it and leaves. Jasmine returns the following day and tells Dr Abbott that she had unprotected sex, and Dr Abbott advises Jasmine to book herself into an STD clinic as a precaution. Later, she visits a very weak Alice Dingle and tells Alice that she would like to admit her to hospital, but Alice doesn't want to.

In 2013, her appearances have included when Belle Dingle (Eden Taylor-Draper) was taken by her mother, Lisa (Jane Cox) to discuss contraception with Dr. Abbott, and the occasions when Rhona Goskirk (Zoe Henry) visits her in connection with her back injury. Viewers have seen Rhona becoming addicted to her painkillers and getting frustrated with Dr. Abbott for lowering her dosage.

== Charles Vaughan ==
Charles Vaughan
- Emmerdale character
- Portrayed by: Richard Cole
- Duration: 2006–2009
- First appearance: 22 September 2006
- Last appearance: 6 January 2009
- Introduced by: Keith Richardson
In-universe information
- Occupation: Senior police officer

Charles Vaughan is a friend of Tom King (Ken Farrington) and the superintendent of Hotten police station. He appeared from 2006 to 2009.

Vaughan first appears when his old friend Tom is kidnapped by Cain Dingle (Jeff Hordley) and Sadie King (Patsy Kensit). Tom later chooses Vaughan as his best man for his Christmas Day wedding to Rosemary Sinclair (Linda Thorson). Tom is murdered on his wedding day and after his death Vaughan becomes close to Tom's widow Rosemary. Tom's son, Matthew King (Matt Healy) makes an unofficial complaint to DCI Grace Barraclough (Glynis Barber), about their closeness. Barraclough then speaks to Vaughan, who realises that he should have a professional relationship only with Rosemary.

After this investigation, Vaughan continues to appear as the senior police officer. He gets involved in 2008 when Donna Windsor-Dingle (Verity Rushworth) makes a complaint about PC Shane Doyle (Paul McEwan). He advises Donna not to make a formal complaint as it might affect her career. On 30 December 2008, Shane's body is found in a local lake. Early the following month, he goes to Matthew's funeral. This is his last appearance.

== Peter Birch ==
Peter Birch
- Emmerdale character
- Portrayed by: Philip Bird
- Duration: 2006, 2008
- First appearance: 13 October 2006
- Last appearance: 3 November 2008
- Introduced by: Keith Richardson
In-universe information
- Father: Joe Scarlet
- Mother: Lily Butterfield
- Adoptive father: Harold Birch
- Adoptive mother: Edna Birch
- Wife: Jacqueline Birch
- Daughters: Eve Jenson
- Aunts: Edna Birch
- Other relatives: Mildred Finch; Harriet Finch

Peter Birch is Lily Butterfield's (Anne Charleston) son. For most of his life, he believed that Harold and Edna Birch (Shirley Stelfox) were his parents but Edna, blackmailed by Tom King, tells him in October 2006 that she and her husband unofficially adopted him as Lily (his birth mother and Edna's sister) was single and couldn't take care of him. Peter takes this very badly and has no contact with Edna afterwards.

In September 2008, Peter reappears to visit Lily - without Edna's knowledge. He tells Lily that he is badly in debt but she is unable to help. However, weeks later she and her colleagues win a car worth £15,000. She offers Peter her share, £3000, but he makes her feel guilty so she reluctantly gives Peter the ticket so he can claim the full £15,000. The missing ticket is soon noticed, and eventually Lily confesses to Edna what happened. Edna asks Peter to return the money, but he refuses, so Edna takes the money out of her savings so Lily can pay her colleagues back. She does not tell Lily that the money was hers, not Peter's.

== Sandra Flaherty ==
Sandra Flaherty
- Emmerdale character
- Portrayed by: Christine Brennan (2006); Janet Bamford (2008); Joanne Mitchell (2016, 2021–2022)
- Duration: 2006, 2008, 2016, 2021–2022
- First appearance: 3 February 2006
- Last appearance: 30 September 2022
- Introduced by: Keith Richardson (2006); Jane Hudson (2021)
In-universe information
- Other names: Sandra Livesy
- Sisters: Bridget Flaherty
- Husband: Gordon Livesy (until 2009)
- Daughters: Liv Flaherty
- Stepsons: Aaron Dingle

Sandra Flaherty (also Livesy) made her first screen appearance on 3 February 2006. She was initially played by Christine Brennan and then Janet Bamford in 2008. She is the ex-wife of Gordon Livesy (Gerard Fletcher/Gary Mavers) and mother of Liv Flaherty (Isobel Steele) and stepmother of Aaron Livesy (Danny Webb/Danny Miller). When the character was reintroduced in 2016, the part was recast to Joanne Mitchell. Sandra has since been reintroduced for brief stints in 2021 and 2022.

She accompanies Gordon when he brings his son Aaron to Emmerdale to visit his mother, Gordon's ex-wife Chas Dingle (Lucy Pargeter). Sandra is pregnant and Aaron is unable to return home after being in contact with someone who had German measles. In 2008, Sandra appears after Aaron is arrested. Chas goes to see Gordon and sees that Sandra has a black eye. She initially believes that Gordon is responsible but he tells her that Aaron hit Sandra and refuses to take Aaron back. Seven years later, when Gordon comes back into Chas and Aaron's lives, he reveals his marriage to Sandra has broken down and he no longer has contact with his daughter, Liv. Two months later, Aaron and Robert Sugden (Ryan Hawley) track Sandra and Liv down to inform them that Gordon abused Aaron when he was a child. Sandra admits to Aaron that she knew about what Gordon did to him and kept quiet, causing Aaron to lose his temper and grab her by the arm. His violent altercation with Sandra is witnessed by Robert and Liv.

In March 2016, Sandra comes to the village to collect Liv, only to find out Liv had been going to see Gordon. Sandra come face to face with Chas. Sandra blames Chas for getting Aaron in the mess he is. Sandra attempts to leave but Chas blocks her way. Sandra confesses to Chas that she did have suspicions of Aaron's. Sandra tells Chas that fourteen years earlier, she had taken Liv, then a baby, with her to her mother's house following an argument with Gordon. The next day, when she returned, she had discovered Aaron's wet pyjamas in the bin. Sandra had believed that Aaron had wet himself and Gordon had got angry with him for this. Unknown to her, Gordon had raped Aaron but she never knew at the time. Gordon got rid of Aaron's pyjamas after raping him. Sandra then reveals to Chas that the day before Aaron had left in 2008, she overheard Aaron and Gordon arguing in the bathroom and Aaron saying to Gordon "You can't do that to me anymore". Chas convinces Sandra to tell to give a statement to the police. After Gordon is found guilty of raping Aaron, Sandra makes plans to move to Dublin, but Liv is reluctant to go with her, as she wants to live with Aaron. After being convinced to let Liv stay with Aaron, Sandra leaves for Dublin.

== Bridget Burgess ==
Bridget Burgess
- Emmerdale character
- Portrayed by: Eileen O'Brien
- Duration: 2006–2007
- First appearance: 28 November 2006
- Last appearance: 25 February 2007
- Introduced by: Keith Richardson
In-universe information
- Occupation: Teacher
- Husband: Anthony Burgess

Bridget Burgess is Belle Dingle's (Eden Taylor-Draper) teacher. She appeared in 2006 and 2007. She was played by Eileen O'Brien, who later re-appeared in Emmerdale in early 2013 as Beattie Dixon.

Bridget first appears when she sends a letter to Belle's parents, Zak (Steve Halliwell) and Lisa Dingle (Jane Cox), asking to see them. Belle intercepts the letter and persuades her uncle Shadrach (Andy Devine) to be her father. However, when they meet, Shadrach realises that she and him used to be an item. He tries to restart their relationship, but she is not interested. Bridget soon discovers that Shadrach is not Belle's father and sets up a meeting with Zak and Lisa, and tells them Belle is having behavioural problems. Zak and Lisa declare that Belle will start to behave but when she removes a security block on the computers, Bridget and the head teacher want to suspend Belle. This leads to an argument with Zak, and he removes Belle from the school. Bridget tries on several occasions to persuade Zak to let her return, but he refuses.

== DS Karen Williams ==
Karen Williams
- Emmerdale character
- Portrayed by: Annie Fitzmaurice
- Duration: 2006–2009
- First appearance: 26 December 2006
- Last appearance: 3 March 2009
- Introduced by: Keith Richardson
In-universe information
- Occupation: Police officer

Detective Sergeant Karen Williams is a police officer. She has appeared from 2006 to 2007 and from 2008 to 2009.

DS Williams is first seen investigating the Christmas Day murder of Tom King (Ken Farrington) in 2006. The case against Tom's three sons Jimmy (Nick Miles), Matthew (Matt Healy) and Carl (Tom Lister) eventually collapses much to her frustration and she does not find out that Carl is the killer. Later in 2007, Williams investigates a fire at Tenant House started by Victoria Sugden (Isabel Hodgins) who confesses and Williams arrests and charges her. Andy Sugden (Kelvin Fletcher) then confesses to Williams that he had started a fire seven years earlier in which his adoptive mother Sarah Sugden (Alyson Spiro) was killed and Williams also arrests and charges him. Williams investigates the disappearance of Rosemary Sinclair (Linda Thorson) and arrests and charges Matthew with her murder but is forced to let him go when Rosemary is later found to have committed suicide in America. In March 2008, Williams arrests Viv Hope (Deena Payne) over her involvement in a children's charity fraud committed by Freddie Yorke (Keith Woodason). Although Viv claims that she removed the money she had put into the bogus charity when she realized what Freddie was doing, Williams believes that Viv was involved in the con as well and charges her. On 30 December 2008 she is called to a lake where a body has been found and she soon discovers it is the body of a colleague, PC Shane Doyle (Paul McEwan). She and DC Nick Henshall (Michael McKell) then lead the investigation into Shane's murder, and arrest and charge PC Ross Kirk (Samuel Anderson) with the murder but the case against him is later dropped. Later in January, Williams leads the search of the Dingles' house and arrests Eli Dingle (Joseph Gilgun) for Shane's murder. She and DC Henshall later arrive in the village to find Jasmine Thomas (Jenna-Louise Coleman) and Debbie Dingle (Charley Webb), who Eli revealed were Shane's killers. Jasmine runs away, but Debbie is arrested and later charged with murder. In early March, Jasmine returns and confesses to killing Shane in order to clear Debbie's name. Williams and Henshall interview her and she is later sentenced to four years imprisonment for manslaughter.

== DCI Grace Barraclough ==
Grace Barraclough
- Emmerdale character
- Portrayed by: Glynis Barber
- Duration: 2006–2007
- First appearance: 26 December 2006
- Last appearance: 27 September 2007
- Introduced by: Keith Richardson
In-universe information
- Occupation: Detective Chief Inspector
- Father: Frank Barraclough
- Mother: Harriet Barraclough
- Brothers: Lawrence Barraclough

Grace Barraclough, portrayed by Glynis Barber, made her first appearance on 26 December 2006.

DCI Grace Barraclough first appeared with her colleague DCI Vikesh Dasari (Stephen Rahman-Hughes), as part of the storyline surrounding the death of Tom King (Ken Farrington). While investigating Tom's murder, she suspected Bob Hope (Tony Audenshaw), even more so after he confessed. However, it emerged that he had confessed to protect his son Jamie (Alex Carter). She later started dating Carl King (Tom Lister) secretly, as a honeytrap. Their relationship became serious, however if they were discovered, Grace could lose her job. She carried on with the relationship, but when Vikesh saw her with Carl he gave her an ultimatum; end the relationship or he would tell her boss Charles Vaughan (Richard Cole) and her career would be over. (Vaughan was already angry with Grace for failing to get a conviction on the King case, amongst other things). Knowing what she must do, Grace ended the affair, even though she still loved Carl.

After Grace ended the affair, Carl left the village, for a brief amount of time to get over Grace. When Carl returned however, he seduced Grace again. She tried again to end the relationship but when she learned that her mother had had a stroke, she regretted being so hard on Carl as he refused to be a shoulder to cry on. She stopped answering when he called; and later in the week, when Carl read about her mother's death in the paper, he resorted to waiting outside the police station and Grace's home in order to get her to speak to him. It finally worked, but she confessed that the first time they had had a drink together, she had followed him and was trying to trap him for information about the murder of Carl's father. Grace and Carl worked through their issues and their relationship was back on track. Grace died on 27 September after being hit by a lorry after Carl admitted to her that he had killed his father. Carl didn't attend her funeral but laid flowers at her grave later on. It was supposed that Matthew King (Matt Healy) had ordered her death.

== DCI Vikesh Dasari ==
DCI Vikesh Dasari
- Emmerdale character
- Portrayed by: Stephen Rahman-Hughes
- Duration: 2006–2007, 2025
- First appearance: 26 December 2006
- Last appearance: 16 May 2025
- Introduced by: Keith Richardson (2006); Iain MacLeod (2025)
In-universe information
- Occupation: Detective Inspector (until 2007); Detective Chief Inspector

Detective Chief Inspector Vikesh Dasari is a local police officer. He appeared from 2006 to 2007 and again in 2025. He is played by Stephen Rahman-Hughes. Detective Inspector Dasari appears in the village, with his CID colleague DCI Grace Barraclough (Glynis Barber) following the death of Tom King (Ken Farrington). Barraclough is later taken off the case for getting too involved and Dasari leads the investigation into Tom's murder. In July 2007, he is promoted to the rank of Detective Chief Inspector (DCI), appearing until 3 July 2007.

In May 2025, Dasari visits Home Farm to question Joe Tate (Ned Porteous) in relation to an allegation of spiking Noah Dingle's (Jack Downham) drink. A day later, Dasari returns to investigate when Joe is pushed through a window. He informs the villagers that the culprit will face a charge of attempted murder. It is later revealed that Dawn Fletcher (Olivia Bromley) is Joe's attacker but Dasari never finds out and Dawn gets away with it.

Rahman-Hughes took to Instagram to address his return to the role after 19 years. He wrote: "From tonight's episode I'll be appearing on Emmerdale in a role I am reprising from 19 years ago. My second TV job appearing with the incredible @glynisbarber for those that may remember. Sadly Glynis was killed off and couldn't return but I was invited to come back. I had the most fun I've had on a set in a long time. So much welcome back warmth from a superb cast. There’s a big crime to solve so watch and see the drama unravel". Barber commented on the post, writing: "I hope you laid some flowers for poor old Grace?", to which Rahman-Hughes joked that he did.

== DI Frank Blackmore ==
Frank Blackmore
- Emmerdale character
- Portrayed by: Daniel Coll
- Duration: 2006–2008
- First appearance: 26 December 2006
- Last appearance: 13 February 2008
- Introduced by: Keith Richardson
In-universe information
- Occupation: Police officer

Detective Inspector Frank Blackmore, portrayed by Daniel Coll, was a police officer who initially appeared to investigate the murder of Tom King (Kenneth Farrington), alongside DS Karen Williams (Annie Fitzmaurice), DCI Grace Barraclough (Glynis Barber) and DI Vikesh Dasari (Stephen Rahman-Hughes). He took statements from the many residents of the village who attended his wedding to Rosemary Sinclair (Linda Thorson), and also investigated her subsequent disappearance a year later. He also questioned Chas (Lucy Pargeter) and Eli Dingle (Joseph Gilgun) as they were arrested under suspicion of murder. Blackmore also interrogated Hari Prasad regarding his false statement saying that Tom's sons, Jimmy (Nick Miles), Carl (Tom Lister) and Matthew (Matt Healy) were responsible.

Blackmore then investigates the death of Colin McFarlane (Michael Melia) where he interviewed Chas, who slept with Colin in an upmarket hotel the evening before he died. He also investigated a house fire at Tenant House, where he arrested and charged Andy Sugden (Kelvin Fletcher) for the death of his adoptive mother, Sarah Sugden (Alyson Spiro) in 2000. He continued to appear in 2008, when he questioned Sam Dingle (James Hooton), who was caught in the possession of drugs. This was his last appearance.

== Other characters ==
Character	Date(s)	Actor	Circumstances
Rev Ian McMahon	25 March	Jim Whelan	The Reverend presiding over the wedding ceremony of Alasdair Sinclair (Ray Coulthard) and Sadie King (Patsy Kensit).
Susie Carter	27 August - 8 December	Polly Highton	A servant of Rosemary Sinclair (Linda Thorson) in Oakwell Hall. Susie knew that Rosemary was broke. Rosemary attempted to recruit Susie to Home Farm, but there was Pearl Ladderbanks (Meg Johnson). Susie is Polish and she was very loyal to Rosemary.
David Brown	13 July	Peter Alexander	An estate agent who is in the Kings River Showhome when it collapses. He is standing near Noreen Bell (Jenny Tomasin) when she opens a cupboard door and turns on a light, creating a spark which starts a series of explosions setting him on fire and the house collapses. After being retrieved from the house, David dies after paramedics fail to revive him. Noreen also dies.
Gilbert Duff	25 July-3 August (2 episodes)	Christopher Beeny	The cousin of Noreen Bell (Jenny Tomasin), who attends her funeral and later her will reading, where he receives her thimble collections while Val Lambert (Charlie Hardwick) inherits Noreen's money.
Jenny Albright	26 October - 1 December	Kirsha Southward	A friend of friend of Victoria Sugden (Isabel Hodgins) and Kayleigh Gibbs (Lily Jane Stead). The three girls hurl eggs at the Post Office window, distressing a heavily pregnant Viv Hope (Deena Payne) but they are chased off by Eli Dingle (Joseph Gilgun). The three girls then went to a nightclub after a woman gave Victoria tickets to go there. They got dressed up and told Victoria's father Jack that they were going out. They did not stay long as they spotted Victoria's adoptive brother Andy and a lot of other Emmerdale residents at the club. As they were leaving, Andy's lodger, Jo Stiles (Roxanne Pallett), saw them and told them about the dodgy people in the club but promised not to tell Jack that they had been there.
James Jenson	3–6 November (2 episodes)	Ben Peyton	The husband of Eve Birch (Raine Davison). He is seen when Eve's grandmother, Edna Birch (Shirley Stelfox) and her boss Tom King (Kenneth Farrington) attend their wedding blessing in France. In 2010, James and Eve split after Eve cheats on James with his best friend.
