= Marlon Dingle =

Fictional character from Emmerdale

- Emmerdale character
- Portrayed by: Mark Charnock
- Duration: 1996–present
- First appearance: Episode 2125; 17 October 1996
- Introduced by: Keith Richardson
- Spin-off appearances: The Dingles Down Under (1997); Revenge (1998); The Dingles in Venice (1999); The Dingles: For Richer, For Poorer (2010); Paddy and Marlon's Big Night In (2011)
In-universe information
- Occupation: Chef; Pub landlord
- Father: Albert Dingle
- Mother: Delilah Dingle
- Brothers: Eli Dingle
- Wife: Tricia Stokes (2003–2004); Donna Windsor (2006–2009); Laurel Thomas (2014–2015); Jessie Grant (2019–2020); Rhona Goskirk (2022–present)
- Sons: Leo Goskirk
- Daughters: April Windsor
- Stepsons: Arthur Thomas; Billy Fletcher; Ellis Chapman
- Stepdaughters: Ivy Malcolms
- Granddaughters: Rebecca Windsor
- Grandfathers: Jedediah Dingle
- Grandmothers: Peg Dingle
- Uncles: Zak Dingle; Shadrach Dingle
- First cousins: Butch Dingle; Sam Dingle; Cain Dingle; Tina Dingle; Belle Dingle; Chas Dingle; Mandy Dingle; Lilith Dingle; Del Dingle; Gennie Walker
- Other relatives: Charity Dingle; Debbie Dingle; Aaron Dingle; Jon Dingle; Luke Dingle; Matthew Dingle; Mark Dingle; Noah Dingle; Ryan Stocks; Nate Robinson; Eve Dingle; Leyla Sugden

Marlon Dingle is a fictional character from the British ITV soap opera Emmerdale, played by Mark Charnock. He made his first appearance during the episode broadcast on 17 October 1996. Following the departure of Zak Dingle (Steve Halliwell), Marlon currently serves as the second longest-running character featuring in the programme, surpassed only by Eric Pollard (Chris Chittell). In terms of appearances, Marlon serves as the character with the most appearances to date, having appeared in over 3900 episodes. He is also the only one to appear in all 5 direct-to-home-media Emmerdale films. For his portrayal of Marlon, Charnock won the British Soap Award for Outstanding Achievement at the 2023 British Soap Awards.

== Storylines ==
Marlon comes to Emmerdale to stay with his uncle Zak Dingle (Steve Halliwell). He tells his family that he has heard about the new road development and hoped there would be some work going. His cousin Butch Dingle (Paul Loughran) offers to put in a good word with the local security firm. Marlon supports Zak when he is diagnosed with testicular cancer and he befriends Paddy Kirk (Dominic Brunt). Marlon finds employment as a chef at Kathy Glover's (Malandra Burrows) tea rooms and wine bar. When co-owner Eric Pollard's (Chris Chittell) marriage ends, he puts Marlon in charge of his business. Marlon is initially overwhelmed by the responsibility. Kathy later hires Carlos Diaz (Gary Turner) to work at the diner and Marlon goes to work at The Woolpack. Bernice Blackstock (Samantha Giles) is impressed by Marlon's cooking and they share a kiss, but it leads nowhere. New barmaid Tricia Stokes (Sheree Murphy) regularly flirts with Marlon and they soon begin dating.

Marlon and Tricia's relationship is tested when Tricia agrees to marry Jason Kirk's (James Carlton) boyfriend, Joe Fisher, so he can stay in the country. They almost break up, but reconcile just before the wedding. Tricia invests the money she is given by Joe in Marlon's business, Chez Marlon. When the business fails, Tricia leaves the village. Marlon has a brief relationship with locum vet Rhona Goskirk (Zoe Henry), until Tricia returns and they decide to get married. Ahead of the wedding, Tricia injures her neck and calls off the wedding, so their friends Paddy and Emily Kirk (Kate McGregor) marry instead.

Marlon and Tricia did eventually marry a few months later. Tricia was offered the chance to star in a Bollywood film and went to India for six months. While she was away, Marlon was dreadfully lonely and had a drunken one night stand with his cousin Charity Dingle (Emma Atkins). When Tricia returned, the secret came out and she left Marlon. His desperate attempts to win her back seemed to have failed but she was willing to forgive him after reading a romantic list of her characteristics written by Marlon. On New Year's Eve 2003, Tricia was injured during a storm which resulted in part of the Woolpack's roof collapsing on top of her. Tricia was found alive and rushed to hospital but suffered a heart attack. The hospital staff revived her but tests revealed that she had suffered serious brain damage. She was declared braindead and the medical team requested permission to switch off her life support machine. Marlon took some convincing to agree, as he was still determined that she would recover, but he finally agreed on realising that there was no hope of her recovering.

The grief suffered by Marlon was prolonged close to a year until he developed a friendship with Donna Windsor (Verity Rushworth). It was thanks to Donna's kind heart that Marlon moved on from his loss. Although he rebuffed her attempts to snare him early in the year, Donna proved she was the woman for Marlon when she helped him look after his cousin, Lilith Dingle's (Amanda Hennessy), children when she suddenly left them with him. It didn't take long for Marlon and Donna to fall in love. When he proposed to her en route to a chef's competition in Newcastle, Donna agreed and it looked like there was a happy ending in sight. However, being so young, marriage was a big thing for Donna to consider. She'd also recently become close to Max King (Charlie Kemp) and his death left her absolutely devastated.

Shortly before the wedding, Marlon started having nightmares about Tricia. This was made worse when Marlon caught Donna trying on Tricia's wedding dress, making him think that Tricia had come back. Donna explained she felt like she was always being compared to Tricia. On the morning of the wedding, Donna confided in Marlon that she had feelings for Max while they were together. Heartbroken by this admission, Marlon wondered if they should get married but his love for her overwhelmed his doubts and they married.

On return from honeymoon, Marlon and Donna spent their first few months of married life living at Smithy Cottage with Paddy and Toni Daggert (Kerry Stacey). Donna and Marlon were desperate to get on the property ladder but the prices at King & Sons' new development were too steep. So when they won the Kings River Showhome, they were thrilled but shocked to discover that they still had to pay a deposit. Donna's mother, Viv Hope (Deena Payne), offered Donna the money if Donna would be her surrogate. Marlon and Donna were stunned by Viv's suggestion that Donna get pregnant with her half-brother or sister but agreed because they needed the money to keep their new home. However the showhome collapsed following a gas explosion, leaving Marlon and Donna's dream shattered. Donna returned her mother's money as there was no longer a house to buy and Viv didn't need a surrogate, discovering she was pregnant. Following the showhome collapse, Marlon and Donna lived in a caravan outside Wishing Well cottage. They were building an "Eco Home" but realised the land they were building on belonged to Matthew King (Matt Healy) and the local council. Donna had a major run in with Marlon's family when she reported Shadrach (Andy Devine) to the police for theft. Called up before the Dingle Court, Donna defied Zak and Lisa Dingle (Jane Cox), revealing she planned to join the police force. Marlon backed her up and they stood strong together.

In October 2006, two men were looking for Marlon's brother Eli (Joe Gilgun) and broke into The Woolpack to get Marlon to tell them where Eli was, although Marlon didn't know. The pair wrecked the pub, beat up Marlon and stole thousands from the till. The men were later arrested after Eli framed them for firearm possession. In December, Lilith left her children with Marlon and Donna again while she went to work. Marlon, Donna and the children moved into The Woolpack, following Lilith's arrest for armed robbery. This didn't work out and Marlon decided the children should live with their uncle because his and Donna's living arrangements were inadequate. Donna was very upset and the children returned after running away from their uncle. Marlon saw how miserable they were and they went on the run, rather than return them to their uncle. However, they were soon caught by the police and Social Services took the children away. Marlon and Donna applied for custody of their children via the courts and prepared a room for the children but Val Lambert (Charlie Hardwick) accidentally started a fire in The Woolpack, damaging the building temporarily. Despite a positive report, their social worker, Mrs Jenkins, told them that they would not get the kids until they had more suitable accommodation.

Marlon, attempting to improve his and Donna's financial problems, used their savings to place a bet. He won £18,000 but the bookie refused to pay up so he and Eli came up with a plan to get his winnings. Just before Eli went into the bookie's, Marlon found he had a gun and learned Eli was planning an armed robbery. Marlon was shocked but let him go ahead. Eli threatened the bookie and was almost successful when a customer came in and a fight ensued. Marlon, who had been waiting in the car, got frustrated and went inside to find Eli struggling with the customer. Pretending not to know him, Marlon yelled at Eli to leave but he would not. Marlon went to grab the gun but it went off, hitting Marlon in the chest. Marlon collapsed, telling Eli to go, leaving the customer and the bookie to ring the police. Marlon was rushed to hospital and made a full recovery. Marlon is put in the paper as a hero. Marlon is filled with guilt when the grateful bookie turns up to give him his winnings and when Donna even praised him for stopping the robbery. With the money, Marlon and Donna purchase a house, hoping to raise their family there.

However, Marlon later told Donna the truth and although she was very angry, quickly forgave him. Eli began blackmailing them. He got Donna to use her position in the police force to allow him to break into a warehouse. While at the warehouse, Marlon got cold feet and warned Eli that it was a trap. Eli was angry, but Donna had informed Zak of everything that had happened. Zak confronted Eli and kicked him out of Donna and Marlon's house. However, far from it all being over, Marlon set off to work only for Eli to kidnap him.

Bundled into the back of a van, Eli drove him to the top of a multi-storey carpark, where he pretended he was going to throw him off the edge of the building to punish him for his 'betrayal'. Marlon was terrified, unsure of what his volatile brother was capable of, and asked what he had ever done to Eli. Eli revealed that he had always resented his older brother because everybody loved him and nobody had ever loved Eli. Marlon eventually managed to get free and the brothers had a fight which ended with Eli toppling over the edge of the building and only hanging on by his fingertips. Marlon tried to save him – offering his hand – but Eli refused to be rescued. Eventually Donna arrived and helped Marlon haul him to safety, but Eli ran off, apparently upset at being saved. Marlon broke down in tears and later confessed to Donna that he had considered allowing his younger brother to die and he thought that made him a terrible person. He warned Donna that being with him might only cause her trouble, but Donna reassured him.

In 2008, The Woolpack was entered in a magazine Pub of the Year competition. Val bribed Jasmine Thomas (Jenna-Louise Coleman) to tell her when the judge was coming. Marlon, Val and Diane Sugden (Elizabeth Estensen) went frantic with Marlon trying to create a gourmet menu. Diane reminded him that they were a traditional pub and not to get worked up about it. Unbelievably, they discovered they made it to the finals. Antony Worrall Thompson was discovered to be the celebrity judge. This coincided with Val's surprise wedding to Eric. Anthony was impressed with Marlon's cooking and asked Marlon to call him. When Marlon summed up the courage to call, Marlon was invited to a local television audition. A camera crew arrived at The Woolpack to record a programme featuring a special from Marlon. Marlon hired Jake Doland (James Baxter) to help him in the kitchen and also had a column in The Hotton Courier. Marlon was later approached by the owner of Malt, The Woolpack's rival pub. He offered Marlon a better job with better pay but Marlon declined, wanting to stay in Emmerdale.

In 2008, Viv, was arrested for fraud. However, Viv had been framed by Freddie Yorke (Keith Woodason). Donna found it hard, knowing her colleagues knew about her family situation. Wanting to prove her mother's innocence, she started going on unofficial stakeouts with colleague Ross Kirk (Samuel Anderson). After some time searching, they discovered where he lived. Donna tried to apprehend him but Freddie escaped. Donna followed closely at high speed but she lost control of the car and crashed. Ross pulled them from the car before it exploded and Donna spent months in hospital learning how to walk again. She became convinced she was a laughing stock at the station and decided to resign. Marlon was thrilled but when Donna came home, he saw she was miserable. He told her that he'd support her if she wanted to return to work. In September, Donna and Marlon attended a police comedy night. Marlon's cousin Chas Dingle (Lucy Pargeter), Ross's date, got into a fight with the comedian. Marlon defended her and the fight ended with Marlon and Chas being thrown out. Marlon took Chas home, leaving Donna with Ross. Donna and Ross shared a night of passion in Donna's hotel room which Donna regretted afterwards. She and Marlon decided to go on holiday. When they returned, Marlon announced he and Donna were planning to start a family but Ross tried to convince Donna that would be a mistake. He also told her that she had married too young. On 1 January 2009, Donna told Marlon of her affair with Ross. Marlon had suspected it but was still devastated, especially when Donna said she loved Ross and Marlon. Hellbent on revenge, Marlon went to the police and implicated Ross in the murder of Shane Doyle (Paul McEwan).

He gradually started to warm to Donna and was considering taking her back, although Zak warned him against it. After a conversation with Eli, who reminded him that Donna had forgiven Marlon for the raid on the bookies, Marlon agreed to give his marriage another go – on the condition that she never saw Ross again. Donna agreed, but she was certain that Ross was innocent and broke her promise to Marlon, visiting her ex-lover in prison. Meanwhile, the other Dingles remained hostile towards her and she got a very cold reception at Zak's birthday party. Surprisingly, Eli came to Donna's defence, for which Marlon was grateful. However, during a conversation with Eli, Donna noticed a vital piece of evidence that could clear Ross's name and she shopped her brother-in-law to the police. When Marlon realised that Donna had betrayed both him and his family in order to free Ross, he dumped her and later asked for a divorce. They might have reconciled had not Donna caught Marlon in a drunken clinch with his cousin Chastity. Following this, Donna departed the village – seemingly for good – leaving behind a devastated Marlon. To make matters worse, Marlon's best friend Paddy (who is in love with Chas) also found out about the kiss and the two of them fell out for quite a while. Following a period of depression, Marlon dedicated himself to helping little brother Eli, who had been disowned by the rest of the Dingle clan after his confession led to the arrest of Debbie. The pair came up with several plots to try to set her free. Faced with Debbie's release, Eli went missing for a time, but Marlon eventually found him sleeping rough and managed to convince his wayward sibling to come home.

The two brothers lived together until Eli's departure in 2010, along with Lizzie Lakely (Kitty McGeever), a blind woman who Marlon befriended. Lizzie upset Marlon when she preyed on his gullibility by pretending to be a psychic, causing Marlon to spend a fortune on phone bills pouring his heart out to her. He got his revenge by tricking her into paying back his money. His life was going smoothly until Moira Barton (Natalie J. Robb) began to work in The Woolpack. Marlon had a previous confrontation with Moira when she criticised his cooking. The two argued furiously at work as Marlon felt that she was invading his domain and finding fault with his food on purpose. It reached boiling point and Moira quit, which led to an angry Diane giving Marlon the cold-shoulder until he apologised. Marlon did so and Moira returned to work, as Marlon explained that since Donna left him, his job was the one area in his life where he felt in control and Moira had threatened that. They reached an understanding and became friends. When Marlon received a letter from Donna, saying that she had met someone else and wanted him to file for divorce, a devastated Marlon found himself turning to Moira as a shoulder to cry on. Because of this, he developed romantic feelings for her and convinced himself that she felt the same way. Going against Paddy's advice, Marlon finally confessed to Moira that he thought he was falling in love with her, leaving her shocked. She let him down and Marlon was left feeling humiliated. After a long heart-to-heart, she convinced him that she was flattered and that he would one day meet the right woman. Alongside this, Marlon also took in Charity and her young son, Noah (Jack Downham) after the family turned against her for trying to steal Cain's money. When Zak and Cain found out, they were angry and Cain punched Marlon in the stomach.

In 2010, Rhona returned to the village of Emmerdale. She and Marlon re-began a relationship, until Rhona expressed an interest in Marlon's best mate and her work partner Paddy Kirk. She split up with Marlon, and began a relationship with Paddy, much to Marlon's despair. It was later revealed that Rhona was expecting Marlon's baby, while she was still with Paddy. Marlon was very upset and told Rhona he did not want to be the part of the baby's life. He refused to go to Rhona's first scan. On Monday 13 December 2010, it was revealed that there was a possibility that Marlon and Rhona's baby may suffer from Down syndrome. It was later confirmed. On Monday 20 December 2010, Rhona decided she was going to go ahead with the pregnancy, and Marlon and Paddy backed her up happily. The trio are all now good friends again.

In January 2011, Marlon admitted to his housemate and colleague Bob Hope (Tony Audenshaw) that his and Rhona's baby was going to suffer from Down syndrome. Later in the evening, Marlon comforted Bob after his wife, Viv, and best friend Terry Woods died in an arson attack caused by Katie Sugden's (Sammy Winward) new boyfriend, Nick Henshall (Michael McKell). Soon after this, he told his friend Laurel Thomas (Charlotte Bellamy) about the baby's Down syndrome. On Tuesday 1 February 2011, Marlon, Rhona and Paddy went for a scan of the baby, and learned that its heart rate was healthy. When the boy was born, he was named Leo, and Marlon became a very proud father.

In the summer of 2012, Marlon and Laurel became a couple after a year of love and attraction between them. This caused major problems for Laurel's marriage to Ashley Thomas (John Middleton), who started abusing his father Sandy Thomas (Freddie Jones) as a result of the stress of trying to make the marriage work. When Laurel discovered this, it signaled the final blow for the couple. With Marlon, Laurel is now maintaining a friendship with Ashley. Marlon let Ashley move in with him after he had nowhere else to go, having moved out of the marital home, where Laurel remained with Sandy and the kids. The children struggled to cope following the recent events, particularly Gabby (Annelise Manojlovic), whose biological mother Bernice returned to the village in November.

In late 2012, Marlon became involved in a row and custody battle with Paddy and Rhona, who wanted to move to New Zealand for a couple of years, with Leo. They eventually decided not to move to New Zealand. Paddy and Marlon resumed their friendship but kept it a secret from Laurel and Rhona. Eventually the two couples reconciled completely and have stayed on good terms. In October 2013, he is attacked by serial killer Cameron Murray (Dominic Power) and is knocked out cold in the flooding Woolpack cellar. Cameron later takes people hostage but eventually lets them go except for Chas and Debbie Dingle (Charley Webb). He later escapes from the cellar and holds Cameron at gunpoint while Chas and Debbie attempt to escape. Marlon then runs to the cellar (now flooding to the top) but Cameron follows. After nearly drowning the three, Cameron is electrocuted. Marlon is put in the paper as a 2nd hero after what happened with Eli and the Bookie years back. He later tells Laurel the truth, she is angry but later forgives him.

Donna dies and Marlon is awarded custody of April Windsor, his long lost daughter. He marries Laurel but is devastated when she becomes an alcoholic. After Jessie Grant arranges a surprise wedding, they marry on Christmas Day. The marriage ends when Jessie has an affair with her former husband Al Chapman. Marlon is arrested for killing Rhona's partner Graham Foster. He is later released when the real culprit, Pierce Harris, Rhona’s ex-husband, who had raped her 3 years previously is arrested and sent back to prison. Marlon has PTSD for sometime after his release, which results in him suffering a heart attack.

In 2021, Marlon and Rhona reconcile. He buys into the woolpack when Charity is disowned by the family after she makes a move on Al, who Debbie had discovered was cheating on her with Priya Sharma (Fiona Wade) weeks before. The business starts to experience financial issues due to the effects of the COVID-19 pandemic. Marlon suggests they start running a barbecue to get more business. Marlon buys a grill which is outside the business’s financial budget. This arrangement is short lived when Matty Barton burns his hands while cooking the barbecue food.

When it is revealed that April is being bullied by her step grandfather, Bob’s daughter, Cathy, Marlon falls out with Bob and bans him from having any contact with April again. April is upset about this and spends time with Bob behind Marlon’s back. This infuriates Marlon even more and it results in an argument between him and Bob, upsetting April even more. Bob and Marlon eventually resolve their differences and April and Cathy make amends.

Al buys into the Woolpack, much to the discomfort of the entire Dingle family. Marlon notices Chas and Al getting closer and tells Cain about this. Chas later reveals that she's using Al in a bid to try to get him out of the woolpack. It is later revealed that Al also has debts to clear. On Christmas Day, Al burns down the Woolpack in a bid to try to claim the insurance. Al tells Chas and Marlon that he can get people to invest so they can keep the woolpack. However, Al’s investor pulls out when Cain tracks him down and threatens him, infuriating Chas and Marlon. The woolpack is then put up for auction and Charity buys the woolpack and gives Chas and Marlon their old jobs back.

After Pierce dies from cancer, Marlon is furious to discover that Rhona has been in contact with his son, Marcus Dean (Darcy Grey). Rhona explains to Marlon that Pierce contacted her before he died and asked her to help him find him. Rhona and Marlon resolve their differences and decide they both want to get married and plan on proposing to each other. They both propose and they both happily accept. However, shortly after, Marlon suffers a severe stroke and is rushed to hospital. Rhona is told that Marlon’s speech and mobility have been severely impaired by the stroke and that he'll need rehabilitation to regain his ability to walk and talk. Marlon chokes on water, as the stroke has also impaired his ability to swallow. He is later taken back to hospital, when he develops pneumonia. He returns home a few weeks later and begins rehabilitation. Marlon initially struggles with the physiotherapy but quickly makes progress and begins walking using a walking frame. Rhona decides that she wants to marry Marlon and proposes to him again. Marlon initially says no as he feels she's doing it out of sympathy. He talks to Paddy about this and Paddy makes him see that she's doing it out of love. Marlon then changes his mind and he and Rhona get engaged. Rhona’s mother, Mary plans the wedding and Marlon decides to set himself a goal that he'll be walking at the wedding. One day before the wedding, Marlon is taken back to hospital after he collapses and is told he has high blood pressure and needs to be kept in overnight. On the day of the wedding, Marlon still has high blood pressure and is unable to be discharged. However, he is discharged in time for the wedding and successfully walks down the aisle and marries Rhona.

By November, Marlon is out of the wheelchair and using a walking stick full time. He helps Victoria out with a catering event and gets his old job back at the Woolpack.

Marlon supports Paddy when he suffers a mental breakdown after he discovers that Chas was having an affair with Al. Paddy goes missing after a one night stand with Mandy. The community start a search for him and Marlon offers to help. April becomes concerned by this and fears that Marlon may have another stroke, particularly when she finds him on the floor after he trips. April convinces Marlon that he has COVID by getting fake tests in a bid to try to keep him away from the search. When Marlon discovers this, he talks to April and assures her that he'll be fine. Paddy returns to the village a few weeks later and seems fine. However, it is later revealed that Paddy has only come home to say goodbye to his loved ones before he takes his life. When Paddy’s loved ones discover this, they go out and search for him. Chas and Marlon find Paddy in the woods with a gun in his hand. Marlon talks Paddy down and successfully saves him from taking his own life. Paddy then returns home and seeks help for his mental health. Marlon hosts a lock in at the woolpack where all the male residents talk to one another and offer Paddy their support.

== Reception ==
For his portrayal of Marlon, Charnock won the British Soap Award for Best Dramatic Performance in 2004. He was nominated again in 2011 for Best Actor. The episode "The Betrayed" was also nominated for Best Single Episode at the 2011 ceremony. In 2022, Charnock once again won the award for Best Dramatic Performance, as well as being shortlisted for the Best Leading Performer accolade. In 2023, he received the British Soap Award for Outstanding Achievement. Charnock was also longlisted for "Best Actor" at the 2024 Inside Soap Awards.

Rick Fulton of the Daily Record branded Marlon "Emmerdale's village jester" and "hapless", but noted that he was "one of the soap's best-loved characters". He also praised Charnock's portrayal of Marlon, calling it "clever" and added that it was this that made him "one of Emmerdale's most popular funnymen, but also showing off his impressive dramatic range when it is called for." The Northern Echo's Steve Pratt pointed out that Marlon does not have the best of luck with women. In 2017, a writer from Inside Soap commented on how they believed that Tricia was still the "true love" of Marlon.
