= Sandy Thomas =

Fictional character from Emmerdale

- Emmerdale character
- Portrayed by: Freddie Jones
- Duration: 2005–2018
- First appearance: Episode 4197; 6 November 2005
- Last appearance: Episode 8074; 19 February 2018
- Introduced by: Keith Richardson
In-universe information
- Occupation: Retired Royal Navy Deck Officer
- Father: Sir Michael Thomas
- Wife: Dorothy Thomas (backstory)
- Sons: Ashley Thomas; Luke Thomas
- Grandsons: Arthur Thomas
- Granddaughters: Jasmine Thomas; Gabby Thomas; Dotty Thomas
- Other relatives: Laurel Thomas (daughter-in law, 2005–2013, 2016–2017); Karen Thomas (daughter-in law); Thomas Tate (great-grandson)

Sandy Thomas is a fictional character from the British soap opera Emmerdale, played by Freddie Jones. Sandy was introduced as the father of Ashley Thomas (John Middleton). He made his first appearance during the episode broadcast on 6 November 2005. The character originally departed in March 2008, but returned to the show in February 2009. On 6 February 2018, it was confirmed that Jones had filmed his final episode and he made his final appearance as Sandy on 19 February 2018.

== Casting ==
On 19 August 2005, Kris Green of Digital Spy reported that actor Freddie Jones had been cast as Sandy, the father of established character Ashley Thomas (John Middleton). He was to join the regular cast, but would initially appear for three months worth of episodes, before returning if and when he was needed. Series producer Kathleen Beedles told Green, "We are delighted to welcome Freddie to the cast." Jones made his first appearance as Sandy in November 2005. Jones announced his decision to quit in January 2008, remaining on-screen until March, however in October 2008, 7 months after deciding to quit, it was announced that he was to return to Emmerdale.

On 6 February 2018, it was confirmed that Jones was to leave the role of Sandy on 19 February 2018. Jones played Sandy for the last 13 years, and his decision to quit was down to Middleton's (Ashley Thomas) leaving in 2017. He was offered an extension on his contract but declined as he felt it was the right time to leave. On 28 January 2020, it was announced Sandy would die off-screen in early February, after Freddie Jones' death in July 2019.

== Storylines ==
Sandy arrives in Emmerdale on his son Ashley Thomas's wedding day to Laurel Potts (Charlotte Bellamy). Ashley and Laurel find him in their bedroom and Ashley introduces him as his father. Ashley and Sandy were estranged, due to Sandy helping Ashley's and Luke's mother and his wife Dorothy, who had a terminal cancer illness, end her life in 1982. However, Ashley's new wife and Sandy's daughter-in law Laurel and Sandy's granddaughters, Jasmine Thomas (Jenna-Louise Coleman) and Gabby Thomas (Annelise Manojlovic), are pleased to have him around. Sandy makes friends with Daz Eden (Luke Tittensor), Len Reynolds (Peter Martin), and Shadrach Dingle (Andy Devine), but makes an enemy of Edna Birch (Shirley Stelfox). He was wrongfully accused of kidnapping Belle Dingle (Eden Taylor-Draper) after she goes missing.

After falling out with his son, Sandy also made friends with Alan Turner (Richard Thorp) and Betty Eagleton (Paula Tilbrook). Father and son reconcile, but Sandy stays with Alan and Betty. Sandy leaves Emmerdale for a while in March 2008 to visit his son, Jasmine's father, Karen's husband, and Ashley's brother Luke in India, but he returns to the village in February 2009 and reveals that Jasmine had visited him when she left Emmerdale. He and his lady friend helped Jasmine find a flat, but she went on the run again. Jasmine tells Sandy that she killed Shane Doyle (Paul McEwan) after he attacked her, and that Debbie Dingle (Charley Webb) is on remand for his manslaughter. She feels guilty and wants to confess, but Debbie and Sandy insist she go on the run. However, she later goes to Debbie's court hearing and confesses. Jasmine is charged with manslaughter and later sentenced to four years in prison.

Sandy stays at the vicarage, but overcrowding mean he and Laurel's father Douglas Potts (Duncan Preston) have to share a room. Sandy tries blackmailing Nicola King (Nicola Wheeler) to move out, and he and Doug later write her a love letter, apparently from Jimmy (Nick Miles) inviting her to move into Mill Cottage. She accepts, easing the overcrowding, but Ashley throws Sandy out after his preoccupation with Jasmine led to Gabby Thomas (Annelise Manojlovic) damaging the computer in Café Hope. Ashley is furious when Gabby says that she thought if she was naughty, she would be sent to prison and could ask the governor to let Jasmine go because it was making her grandfather very sad. Debbie finds Sandy sleeping in her garden shed. Sandy and Ashley reconcile, but Sandy asks Diane Sugden if can move into The Woolpack and she agrees.

Sandy moves back to the vicarage, after Laurel and Ashley's marriage ends for a while, so he can support his son. and Ashley and Laurel reconcile, but Ashley learns she has been having an affair with Marlon Dingle. Laurel chooses to stay with Ashley, but he becomes unhappy and takes his anger out on Sandy. Ashley violently attacks Sandy on numerous occasions, but is soon caught out by Rachel Breckle, Gabby and Laurel, who throws Ashley out. Edna reports him to the police, but Sandy refuses to give a statement. Ashley admits what he has done, leading him and Sandy to rebuild their relationship.

Sandy also befriends teenager Sean Spencer (Luke Roskell), after Betty moves to Australia and Edna dies. Ashley is diagnosed with vascular dementia and later dies at home. Sandy continues to live with Laurel and the family. With his old age and need to see more of the world, Sandy decides to leave the village for Australia. After leaving the village, Sandy bids farewell to his friends and family during a video-call to The Woolpack. A couple of years later, Betty informs Laurel that Sandy has died.
