= Katie Sugden =

Fictional character from Emmerdale

- Emmerdale character
- Portrayed by: Sammy Winward
- Duration: 2001–2015
- First appearance: 18 July 2001
- Last appearance: 9 February 2015
- Introduced by: Steve Frost
In-universe information
- Other names: Katie Addyman; Katie Macey
- Occupation: Stable manager
- Father: Brian Addyman
- Mother: Caroline Addyman
- Brothers: Sam Addyman
- Sisters: Jodie Addyman
- Husband: Andy Sugden (2004–2007, 2014–2015); Declan Macey (2012–2013)
- Stepsons: Jack Sugden
- Stepdaughters: Sarah Sugden

Katie Sugden (also Addyman and Macey) is a fictional character from the British ITV soap opera Emmerdale, played by Sammy Winward. She made her first screen appearance on 18 July 2001 and Winward's casting was announced a week prior. The character was introduced as a love interest for Andy Sugden (Kelvin Fletcher) and their relationship was a focus point for most of the character's tenure. Winward took maternity leave in 2005, returning the following year. Katie's later stories include relationships with Adam Barton (Adam Thomas) and Declan Macey (Jason Merrells), the latter whom she marries. Writers placed Katie in danger in 2012 when she is involved in a mineshaft accident. Winward announced her decision to leave the series in November 2014 and Katie was killed-off, making her final appearance on 9 February 2015.

== Casting ==
On 10 July 2001, Rick Fulton of the Daily Record reported that Winward had joined the cast as Katie alongside Raine Davison, who played Eve Birch. Fulton said the girls would "set pulses racing among Emmerdale's teenage bratpack." Katie was introduced to the soap as the first love interest for Andy Sugden (Kelvin Fletcher). Winward was fifteen when she joined the cast and she said "It is fantastic to start in Emmerdale with Raine. It is a great coincidence because we trained together at drama school. I can't wait to start." A show spokesperson said there would be some "real eye-opening storylines" for the two girls and the rest of the teenage characters, dubbed the "village bratpack." The spokesperson added "We launched them together because we want to show our viewers that we already have very strong teenage storylines to complement our strong teenage following."

Winward took maternity leave in 2005 after becoming pregnant with her first child. Katie departed in May and returned in the following February.

== Storylines ==
Katie is first seen when she meets Andy Sugden when they are in detention together at school and soon begin dating. Andy's adoptive brother, Robert (Karl Davies), is jealous and tries to come between them by telling Katie that he cannot afford to take her out for dinner. However, Andy is given counterfeit money by Cain Dingle (Jeff Hordley) and takes Katie for a romantic meal at Chez Marlon restaurant, ruining Robert's plan.

Katie, Andy, Robert, Eve Birch (Raine Davison), Marc Reynolds (Anthony Lewis) and Ollie Reynolds (Vicky Binns) and Donna Windsor (Verity Rushworth) go to a nightclub but miss the last bus home. To impress Katie, Andy steals a car for them to drive home in but on the way home, Marc, who is driving, knocks down and kills their headmistress, Jean Strickland (Alex Hall). Terrified of the consequences, they leave the body and burn the car but feeling guilty, they eventually confess. Marc is jailed and Katie and the others receive community service.

Whilst their friends enjoy their youth and freedom, Katie and Andy settle down and decide to prove that they are old enough to have an adult relationship by having a baby, Katie falls pregnant but miscarries before leaving to stay with her mother, Caroline (Daryl Fishwick). She eventually returns and she and Andy reconcile. Andy then proposes to Katie and she accepts. When her father Brian (Martin Reeve), moves away for a new job, Katie chooses to stay with Andy and moves in with the Sugdens. When Andy turns 17, he takes over the tenancy of Butler's Farm and he and Katie move into together but the farm becomes Andy's priority. Katie is also put out when Andy's half-brother Daz Eden (Luke Tittensor) moves in with them and the couple struggle to deal with his delinquent behavior. Andy begins to neglect Katie so she is persuaded to have an affair with Robert. Daz sees Robert and Katie together and tells Andy. Desperate to keep the affair secret, Katie persuades Andy to put Daz back into care but ends the affair and marries Andy. She fights her feelings for Robert and tries to make her marriage work but is jealous when Robert dates her friend Donna, in order to expose her true feelings. The affair starts up again but the couple are caught by Robert and Andy's younger sister, Victoria (Hannah Midgley). Robert convinces Victoria to keep quiet and in frustration, Katie shouts at her, leaving her too scared to speak. Eventually, Katie is fed up with living a lie and plans to leave Andy. He finds her goodbye note and confronts her and she and Robert admit their affair, leaving him heartbroken. Donna is also enraged when she finds out and tries to attack Katie in the pub. Katie moves into a caravan with Robert. When everyone turns against her, Katie leaves for a while and gets engaged to Robert on her return. Katie gets a job working as a personal assistant for the King family. However, unbeknownst to Katie, Robert has an affair with Sadie King (Patsy Kensit). Cain finds out and tells Andy, who tells Katie. When she does not believe him, he attacks Robert and tries to force him to tell the truth but Robert insists that Andy is lying. However, Katie learns the truth when she finds text messages from Sadie on Robert's phone. Heartbroken, Katie ends their relationship and throws a drink over Sadie in the pub. Donna also forgives Katie and they repair their friendship, united by their hatred of Robert. Katie then has a one-night stand with Andy, after discussing their marriage and Andy suggests reconciling but Katie refuses, choosing instead to join her father, and they part on good terms. Katie says goodbye to Donna and Robert begs her to stay but she leaves with Cain's sister Chas (Lucy Pargeter).

Nine months later, Katie and Brian are involved in a car accident and the police inform Andy as he is still her legal next of kin. Brian is killed but Katie survives and she stays with Andy until she recovers. Her mother, Caroline, tries to convince Katie to move to Greece but she decides to give her marriage another go. Angry with Katie about the way she treated Andy in the past, Daz is unhappy with Andy and Katie's reconciliation and tries to convince Andy that she will be unfaithful again, even trying to seduce her himself. Sadly, they are seen by lodger Jo Stiles (Roxanne Pallett), who blackmails Katie and begins an affair with Andy. Katie struggles to cope with looking after Andy's daughter, Sarah, and Katie later thinks she is pregnant but it is a false alarm. Andy eventually tells Katie about his affair with Jo and she throws them out but she has to move out as Andy holds the lease. Katie later sleeps with David Metcalfe (Matthew Wolfenden) which ends his relationship with Del Dingle (Hayley Tamaddon). Andy and Katie then divorce.

Katie goes into business with Perdita Hyde-Sinclair (Georgia Slowe) and develops feelings for Perdita's husband, Grayson Sinclair (Christopher Villiers). Grayson's mother, Rosemary King (Linda Thorson), is delighted and encourages Katie, hoping for grandchildren as Perdita can't have children. Katie offers to be a surrogate mother for Perdita but regrets it when she realises how unstable Grayson and Perdita's marriage is. However, Katie gets pregnant but threatens to have an abortion when Perdita leaves Grayson for Sadie's ex-lover and their brother-in-law Matthew (Matt Healy). Katie stays with Grayson and their relationship becomes more intimate. When Perdita finds out, she attacks Katie and fears that she has caused Katie to miscarry and she gets medical help. Perdita then tells Katie that Grayson is bisexual and had had an affair with Paul Lambert (Mathew Bose) causing Katie to doubt her relationship. When Katie learns that Grayson has been supporting Perdita and lying to her, she cons money from him. Katie gives birth to a baby boy in the back of Matthew's car and after signing parental rights over to Perdita, she gives Perdita the money she had conned from Grayson, in order to start a new life in London. Grayson is enraged when he finds out and holds Katie at gunpoint, demanding Katie tell him where Perdita is. Katie refuses to tell him, even when Grayson ends up taking Matthew and his brothers hostage; Grayson ends up shooting Matthew's youngster brother Carl (Tom Lister), but their older brother Jimmy (Nick Miles) helps Matthew overpower Grayson – who is consequently arrested.

Katie grows close to Andy again after Jo, now his wife, throws him out after he has been subjecting her to domestic violence. Katie takes pity on Andy and gives him a job at the stables but he later attempts to kiss her. When he reacts aggressively to her rejecting him, she sacks him. Katie visits Jo and the two women make peace over their differences and Katie convinces Jo to leave the village in order to escape from Andy.

Katie helps Matthew with his ill-fated wedding to her friend Anna De Souza (Emma Davies). However, the ceremony is ruined when Carl – upon discovering that Matthew is partly the reason why their family's company is now under liquidation – confronts him and exposes his brother's involvement in the death of Anna's father Donald (Michael Jayston), who recently died of a heart attack. This prompts Anna to flee, and Katie follows her to comfort whilst Matthew and Carl end up fighting each other shortly afterwards. As Anna struggles to come with the terms of discovering how her father died, Katie urges her to talk to go back to Home Farm and talk to Matthew about it. She reluctantly does on, only to run into Carl upon arriving there. In the moment Anna confronts Carl with demands to know how her father died, they are interrupted by Matthew as the latter attempts to run down Carl in revenge for destroying his wedding and killing their father. However, Matthew – upon seeing Anna standing with Carl – swerves the vehicle and ends up injuring himself as a result; despite Jimmy calling an ambulance with Katie's phone, Matthew dies in Anna's arms. The following day, the Kings are kicked out of Home Farm after being declared bankrupt; Anna later departs the village after attending Matthew's funeral and bidding Katie farewell in respect of their friendship.

When she goes back to work at Home Farm the following month, Katie is escorted off the premises by security. New owners, Mark (Maxwell Caulfield) and Natasha Wylde (Amanda Donohoe), arrive and allow Katie to keep her business at Home Farm. Mark and Katie soon become friends but Natasha is wary until Katie starts dating gamekeeper Lee Naylor (Lewis Linford), unaware that Nathan Wylde (Lyndon Ogbourne) is attracted to her. He uses his position at Home Farm to manipulate them as Katie prefers Lee. After an argument, Nathan and Katie spend a night together but he makes it clear that he doesn't want a relationship with her. However, he objects when she asks Lee to move in. This doesn't last when Katie realizes that Lee repeated things that she told him in confidence so she ends things with Nathan and asks Lee to move out. After Faye (Kim Thomson) and Ryan Lamb (James Sutton) move to the village, she gets to know Ryan and they start dating, despite his mother's objections. Mark tells Faye that Katie is a nice girl that can be trusted but Gennie Walker (Sian Reese-Williams) tells Faye about Katie being a surrogate mother so Faye invites her to dinner and questions her about her past, much to Ryan's embarrassment. He insists Faye apologize and Ryan and Katie are happy until Ryan discovers he has feelings for Maisie Wylde (Alice Coulthard). Not wanting to cheat on Katie, he ends the relationship and starts dating Maisie. However, they reconcile after Maisie and Ryan learn that they are half-siblings. Nathan, however, tells Katie about Ryan and Maisie's "inappropriate" relationship, leading Katie to end things with Ryan again. Andy and Katie later become close once more when she discovers that he is suffering from anger issues which ended his relationship with Adele Allfrey (Tanya Vital). When Andy crashes his Land Rover, he begs Katie for help and she convinces him to see a counselor. Andy later blames Katie and her affair with Robert for his anger issues and when she defends herself, he smashes a mug against the wall, witnessed by Sarah. He later apologizes and he and Katie sleep together again but Katie insists that it was a mistake and they should stay friends.

After he investigates the theft of two horses from her stables, Katie begins a relationship with police officer Nick Henshall (Michael McKell), despite Andy's reservations. When Andy interferes in their relationship causing Katie to dump him, Nick makes silent calls to Katie's house phone and burgles her home, stealing a bracelet her father had given her. Andy is blamed for the incidents and following another confrontation with Andy in the street following a romantic meal with Katie, Nick tries to frame Andy further by starting a fire that kills Terry Woods (Billy Hartman) and Viv Hope (Deena Payne). Nick ensures that Andy is blamed due to his previous conviction for arson and manslaughter and convinces Katie that Andy was responsible. When Nick discovers that his colleagues are onto him, he convinces Katie to come away with him. Katie learns that Nick started the fire when she discovers her stolen bracelet at his house. She also finds newspaper clippings revealing that his wife died in similar circumstances. Nick explains that he was unable to save his wife after their house was petrol bombed by some criminals he had imprisoned. He then tells Katie that he had started the fire and committed the burglary and silent phone calls because he had wanted her to need him to rescue her and keep her safe. When Katie tries to escape Nick panics and takes her hostage at gunpoint. Nick considers killing Katie and himself but she convinces him to spare her and he commits suicide, shooting himself allowing Katie to flee the house unharmed. Katie is traumatised by the events and feels guilty that she ignored Andy's warnings. She asks him for a reconciliation but he turns her down, hurt that she had believed that he was responsible for the fire. Katie leaves to stay with her mother in Greece whilst she recovers from her ordeal.

After briefly dating Nikhil Sharma (Rik Makarem), Katie becomes interested in Declan Macey (Jason Merrells) and his ex-wife, Ella Hart (Corrinne Wicks), tries to warn her off but Katie and Declan begin dating regardless. When Declan's daughter, Mia (Sapphire Elia), dies in a car crash, he reveals that he was not her biological father and Katie supports him through his grief. Declan proposes twice to Katie but she turns him down on both occasions. However, she does move in with him at Home Farm and they are happy together until Declan's half-sister, Megan (Gaynor Faye), visits and takes an immediate dislike to Katie. Megan helps Declan organise a music festival and Katie works hard to convince Megan that she is with Declan because she loves him, and is not after his money as Megan believes. Megan tells Katie about Declan's money troubles being the reason he had contacted her and asked for financial backing with the festival, causing them to argue. Katie leaves briefly but Megan apologises and asks her to return. Katie supports Megan when she reveals that she gave her son, Robbie Lawson (Jamie Shelton) up for adoption when she was younger. Declan finds Robbie and he moves into Home Farm as well. Robbie flirts with Katie and tries to persuade her to leave Declan for him but when she rejects him, Robbie starts making her feel uncomfortable. In retaliation, as Declan refuses to ask him to leave, she manipulates a situation in which Robbie tries to kiss her and uses the CCTV to film him attacking her, wanting to expose his true colours. Declan believes her but Megan suspects the truth and blackmails Declan into allowing Robbie to stay, making Katie move out. However, Declan apologises and he proposes again. This time Katie accepts, much to Robbie and Megan's disapproval, and Declan plans to keep all the festival profits for himself and Katie agrees to help him. Megan interrupts Katie and Declan's wedding when Robbie tells her what has they had done. However, she leaves and the couple marry but at the reception, Megan pushes Katie's face into the wedding cake.

When the couple return from their honeymoon, Katie falls out with her friend Gennie when she reveals that Chas, her half-sister, had been having an affair with Cameron Murray (Dominic Power), leading to Carl, Chas's ex-boyfriend, being killed on Katie's wedding day. After Katie rejects Gennie's attempts to patch things up, she tells Megan and Robbie about Katie setting Robbie up for attacking her. Declan is angered by Katie's actions and begins to mistrust her. He blames her for losing him his family and rides off on a quad bike alone. Katie follows him on another quad and accuses him of changing her for the worst due to his cold, unfeeling demeanor and ruthless nature. Katie rides off angrily but crashes the quad bike and falls down a disused mine shaft. She initially lands on a ledge but Declan's attempts to rescue her fail and the ledge gives way and she falls the rest of the way down to the bottom of the shaft. Trapped and badly injured, Katie crawls through the tunnels in the darkness as a full scale rescue operation is mounted. After days of searching, Declan begins to lose hope of finding Katie alive. She is eventually found by Sam Dingle (James Hooton) in a shaft under the moors in a critical condition. Katie is hospitalised in a critical condition and goes into cardiac arrest but is resuscitated. When Katie finally regains consciousness, she recalls her argument with Declan from before the accident. The couple apologize to each other over their respective actions and Katie returns home, initially walking on crutches. Katie later collapses and is returned to hospital where she is discovered to have damage to her ovaries caused by her injuring her pelvis during the accident. She if left infertile and unable to have children. Declan tells Katie that is doesn't matter but he is secretly disappointed as he had wanted a son to inherit his fortune. Katie begins to regret marrying Declan and she decides to leave indefinitely after talking to Andy about her problems..

Katie returns the following week, hoping to mend her marriage, unaware that Declan had slept with Charity Sharma (Emma Atkins) in her absence. Declan is initially hesitant about a reconciliation but takes her back and they leave for a weekend away. The couple also begin to consider IVF. Katie later considers accepting Steve Harland's (Tom Mannion) offer to invest in a racehorse, but Declan buys it for her instead. However, Katie tells Declan to return it to Steve when he buys the land Declan had hoped to use for another festival.

When the body of Alex Moss (Kurtis Stacey) is found on the site Declan and Megan cover up the discovery. Katie is horrified by this and tries to convince them to confess, even though that would risk them going bankrupt or getting arrested. Whilst confiding this to Chas, who knows about Declan's fling with Charity, Chas jumps to conclusions and asks who Declan is sleeping with. Katie questions Chas about her reaction and she is forced to reveal to Katie about Declan and Charity's one night stand. Wanting revenge, Katie throws a party at Home Farm to "celebrate" the festival and invites Charity and her husband Jai Sharma (Chris Bisson). There, she reveals to the guests about Declan and Charity's fling. Afterwards, she slaps Charity and throws a drink over her, before packing her bags and leaving. Katie moves in with Chas and Cameron, now her boyfriend. After discovering that they are having money problems with their joint bank account, Katie moves in with Andy.

Katie later tells Chas that she felt in the way as Andy had enough problems involving his ex-girlfriend Debbie Dingle (Charley Webb) and their children. Adam Barton (Adam Thomas), Andy's housemate, then invites Katie to move back in with him and Andy. They begin flirting and when Declan enters the pub and sees them together, he calls them pathetic when they toast to being "young, free and single." They go home, late and drunk, but Adam sleeps on the sofa. In the morning, they continue their flirting until Adam leaves and Andy warns Katie, telling her to tell Adam they are just friends as he had just come out of a relationship with Victoria. Katie later runs into Declan who tells her that he believes she will learn to forgive him. After meeting Adam at the pub again, they continue to flirt. They later left the pub together and return home. Katie calls Declan and tells him to come to Andy's so that they can talk. Declan walks in on Katie and Adam, having sex on the sofa. Katie reveals that she had set it up to prove to Declan that they were finished and that there was no future for them. Adam is angry with Katie for using him to hurt Declan.

Declan is devastated by this and threatens to evict Andy for helping Katie hurt him. Andy tells Katie that she had changed and she had to do what she could to help him and his children. Katie goes to see Declan and convinces him to give her another chance, explaining that the only thing keeping them apart was the dead body on the estate. She tells him that for them to stand a chance of a reconciliation, he had to tell the police about the discovery. Andy remains unsure of Katie plan. Katie meets Declan before the launch of the festival, and confesses that there was no hope of a reconciliation for them, that she had never wanted him back and had lied to him about wanting another chance. Declan admits that he had not told the police about the body and had no intention of doing so.

Katie threatens to report Declan and the body discovery to the police herself, but decides against it, knowing Declan could afford to bribe the workers to cover up the incident. Despite this, Declan is still suspicious of Katie and fears that she will reveal his secret and he later tells Megan that she had been right about Katie all along. Katie is shocked to discover Declan had ordered his secretary Nicola King (Nicola Wheeler) spy on her. Later, Katie walks in on Declan flirting with two girls he had met at the launch, Erica and Helen in order to make her jealous. Katie tells him that she hates him and wanted a divorce, throwing her wedding ring at him. When Katie discovers Declan had let her horses out of the stables and free into the village, she enlists Adam's help to round them back up and apologizes to him for using him, but her forgives her and reveals that he did not mind as he was attracted to her. Adam convinces his mother Moira (Natalie J Robb) to allow Katie to keep her stables at Butler's Farm. Katie then tells Declan of her intentions and he tears up her business contract for Home Farm and tells her that is glad to be rid of her.

Victoria (now Isobel Hodgins) returns from a holiday intending to reunite with Adam and Declan tells her about Adam sleeping with Katie. Victoria moves in with Andy and her animosity towards Katie due to her affair with Robert, is reignited when Victoria orders Katie to move out, and Andy defends her. Katie attends Brenda Walker (Lesley Dunlop) and Bob Hope's (Tony Audenshaw) "handfasting" ceremony. After Gennie is killed in a car crash, Katie gives Brenda flowers and offers her condolences. Katie also makes her peace with Victoria and later comforts Chas over her loss. Declan finds Katie mourning Gennie alone and offers his comfort. He tries to make amends with her, but she mistakenly believes that was only showing concern as he wanted to know if she would tell anyone about the body and she leaves angrily. Nicola offers to get Katie's belongings from Home Farm for her, but she refuses, deciding to go herself. Nicola attempts to get Declan to rehire Katie and allow her to bring her business back to Home Farm, but he refuses. Katie tells Chas about the body and Chas advises her to keep it to herself in case she implicated herself in the cover-up. Still upset over Gennie's death and after reminiscing to Brenda about Gennie, Katie makes an anonymous phone call to the police and reports the dead body. Fearing that Declan would attempt to implicate her in the cover up, Katie leaves the village. Whilst she is away, the police, investigating Alex's murder, suspect Declan of killing her in order to silence her over Alex's death.

Katie returns for Alan Turner's (Richard Thorp) funeral. She is happy to see Andy again but is unnerved by Declan's hostility towards her. Katie stays with Declan briefly at Home Farm before demanding he help her find a new home and she moves into Debbie's old house, Tug Ghyll. Declan later gives Katie some papers, telling her they are just finalisations of their divorce but Robbie tells her that since her name is on the deeds to Andy's house, her signing the papers would give Declan permission to sell the property. Katie arranges a meeting with businessman Gil Keane (David Easter) who wants to buy all the properties that Declan is selling and refuses to allow the sale of Andy's house. Without the full set of properties, Gil withdraws his offer. Upon discovering this, Declan is enraged and confronts Katie and threatens her but leaves when Diane Sugden (Elizabeth Estensen) comes in.

Katie flirts with Ross Barton (Michael Parr) after meeting him at Home Farm. Declan sees the together and accuses Katie of helping Ross when he discovers that Ross had been stealing cars from guests at a wedding event he was hosting. Ross later meets Katie again and she tells him that she knows he had stolen Declan's car and the others, but she doesn't care as Declan deserved it. They flirt and have a drink together but it doesn't go any further.

Katie goes on a date with Adam and Victoria admits that she is okay with them seeing each other. However, when two men invite Katie and Victoria to go to a casino night at Home Farm, Diane convinces Katie to go and look out for Victoria. Whilst there, Katie and Robbie witness Declan hit Megan. Katie goes to Butler's Farm to make sure Adam is unhurt after being beaten up by some loan sharks at the farm. Katie continues to be pursued by Ross until he eventually bets Adam that he can't seduce Katie. Adam accepts the bet and buys Katie a drink, later taking her home where he listens to her concerns about Declan lashing out at Megan. Accepting his comfort, she kisses him, and they sleep together. Afterwards, Ross walks in on them, paying Adam and revealing the bet to Katie. Disgusted with Adam, she leaves. Adam later finds Katie in the Woolpack where she forgives him as she had used him to hurt Declan and now he had used her, making the quits. Adam insists that he likes her and Andy encourages Adam to ask Katie out. She turns him down, indifferent. Katie later clears the air with vet Vanessa Woodfield (Michelle Hardwick), who previously accidentally caused the death of Katie's favourite horse. Vanessa convinces Katie to make a go of things with Adam and just have fun. Katie tells Adam that she likes him and asks to be friends. However, when they end up bonding at Butler's Farm, they end up kissing. They are interrupted by Ross but Katie makes him leave and kisses Adam again. The next morning, Moira and Zak Dingle (Steve Halliwell) learn that Katie had spent the night with Adam.

Adam and Katie begin dating, but Adam is jealous when he discovers Katie flirting with his cousin Pete Barton (Anthony Quinlan). He eventually tells her that he doesn't mind if their relationship is nothing more than a bit of fun, but wants where he stands. Katie makes dinner for him and apologises for making him feel insecure. He asks to move in with her, but she refuses, telling him that she had only just got her freedom back. He moves in with Andy instead. When Chas returns from a holiday in France, Katie helps repair her relationship with Adam's uncle, James Barton (Bill Ward).

When Adam discovers that James is his father, he goes on a downward spiral. After getting drunk, he causes an accident on the farm in which Andy is injured. Katie looks after Andy whilst he recovers and Sarah. Andy is unable to forgive Adam for causing his injury and when Adam accuses Andy of using his injury to gain sympathy and reminds of his previous nervous breakdown and his domestic violence towards Jo, Katie is angered by Adam's insensitivity and demands that he apologize. Adam refuses and accuses Katie of still having feelings for Andy. Katie then finishes with him, calling him childish and pathetic.

Andy and Katie grow close once more as she helps him recover from his injuries. They end up kissing, witnessed by Andy's current girlfriend Bernice Blackstock (Samantha Giles). Bernice attacks Katie in the street and Andy finishes with her. Andy tracks Katie down and asks if they can get back together. Katie agrees but decides on keeping it a secret initially. On Katie's 28th birthday Andy proposes to her and she accepts.

The following month, Robert (now Ryan Hawley), returns to the village and moves into Home Farm with his new fiancée Chrissie White (Louise Marwood). Andy and Katie are not happy to see him and an argument breaks out in which Andy punches Robert when he insults Katie. Katie is confused by her old feelings for Robert but when he flirts with her in the stables, she tells him she hates him and he disgusts her. Chrissie's father Lawrence (John Bowe), who dislikes Robert and wants to get him out of Chrissie's life offers Katie to rent the tenancy of Wylie's Farm for a lower price for her and Andy if she helps him expose Robert as a cheat by seducing him in a honey-trap. Katie considers the offer but when Andy finds out he is furious and confronts Lawrence, telling him to stay away from him and Katie. Lawrence apologizes and offers to give them the farm for free. Andy and Katie agree to the offer. Diane later offers to give Katie and Andy her and Andy's adoptive father, Jack's (Clive Hornby) wedding rings for the ceremony. Robert is furious about this and steals the rings and pays for them to be engraved.

On Christmas Day, Andy and Katie marry, for the second time. During the wedding ceremony, Katie discovers that Robert had engraved insults on the rings, referring to Andy as "village idiot" and Katie as "village bike". Enraged Katie orders Robert, who had been attending the wedding after calling a truce with Andy, to leave the church with Chrissie. When he tries to apologise for sabotaging the rings, Katie swears revenge on him. She later tells Andy that she wants rid of Robert from their lives but he tells her not to let him get to her and that they should focus on their future together and moving into Wylie's Farm.

Katie is later suspicious when she discovers that Robert had left Chrissie's son Lachlan (Thomas Atkinson) alone whilst he had supposedly gone on a business meeting, during which time Lachlan had collapsed after overdosing on a legal high. Believing him to be having an affair, she later looks at his mobile phone and discovers texts from someone with a name beginning with "A". Katie accuses Robert of having an affair with Alicia Metcalfe (Natalie Anderson) but is later proved wrong and is humiliated. Chas later convinces Katie to give her cousin Belle Dingle (Eden Taylor-Draper) a job at the stables. Katie sympathises with Belle, who has a manslaughter conviction after accidentally killing one of her friends, Gemma Andrews (Tendai Rinomhota) in a fight, and tells Belle of her own experience with her involvement in Miss Strickland's death. Belle and Katie become close and Katie discovers that Belle is suffering from delusions and hearing Gemma's voice in her head. When she comforts Belle and convinces her to tells her parents, Belle attacks Katie, biting her and locks herself in Katie's car. Katie informs Belle's parents Zak and Lisa Dingle (Jane Cox) and they convince Belle that she needs help.

When Andy and Katie visit Chrissie and Robert in order to finalise the purchase of Wylie's Farm, Chrissie attempts to clear the air with Katie, telling her that they could be friends but Katie warns her that Robert is cheating on her and that he will never change. She also warns Robert that she is keeping an eye on him. When Katie overhears Robert making a phone call for a hotel booking, she is convinced that he is arranging a night away with his secret lover and convinces Chrissie to follow Robert with her to the hotel to catch him in the act. When Chrissie confronts Robert, he tells her that he had been arranging a romantic night away for the two of them. Chrissie is furious with Katie and warns her to stay away from them. Andy also asks Katie to give up her vendetta against Robert, but Robert later visits Katie and threatens her, warning her that she will "get burnt if she plays with fire". When Katie threatens to befriend Chrissie again and get close to him so she can find out what he is up to, an enraged Robert torches the caravan Andy and Katie are staying in whilst awaiting the move to Wylie's. Katie accuses Robert of starting the fire but he laughs off her concerns and she is forced to back down. Andy grows despairing of Katie and considers ending their marriage and she begs him for another chance, and apologizes to Robert for her behavior. Despite this Robert convinces Chrissie to back out of the deal with Wylie's Farm and Robert takes pleasure in informing Katie of this. When Katie attempts to talk to Chas about her suspicions and frustrations over Robert, Chas is skeptical and she and Katie fall out when Katie makes a remark about Gennie. Chas' son Aaron Livesy (Danny Miller) then tells Katie that he knows Robert is having an affair and tells her to come to Wylie's Farm the next day, the day of Robert and Chrissie's wedding.

When Andy discovers that Robert and Chrissie have pulled out of the farm deal, he furiously confronts Katie and tells her not to attend the wedding and considers moving out and ending their marriage. Katie goes for a ride on her horse and receives a text message from Aaron telling her to go to Wylie's Farm. Katie arrives to discover Robert and Aaron kissing and is shocked to discover that Aaron is the person Robert has been having an affair with. Katie takes a picture of them on her mobile phone. Aaron leaves and Katie confronts Robert, happy to have the upper hand on him. He pleads with her not to tell Chrissie and offers to give her and Andy the farm again for free but she refuses his offer and makes to leave, telling him that she intends to tell Chrissie about him and Aaron and show her the picture. Robert turns aggressive and snatches Katie's phone off her but the keypad is locked. Robert refuses to let her leave until she agrees not to tell Chrissie about his affair. Katie charges at him and he pushes her to the ground forcefully. The floor gives way and Katie falls to her death.

Robert checks the body and calls Aaron back to the scene. Aaron is horrified to find Katie dead and Robert tells him that it was an accident. Robert convinces Aaron to help him cover up what happened. Andy later comes to the farm to look for Katie and finds her dead. He breaks down in tears and cradles her.

== Development ==
=== Relationships ===
In one storyline Katie was paired with Adam Barton portrayed by Adam Thomas following the end of Katie's relationship with Declan Macey portrayed by Jason Merrells, speaking about Katie and Adam's pairing, Winward told Digital Spy: "I enjoyed it because I thought it was a good contrast from the Declan relationship, which was so intense and heavy. So much went wrong with Declan, so when Katie started dating Adam he was young, good-looking and very fun-loving. The contrast for her was the enticing thing."

Katie is known for her on and off relationship with Andy Sugden portrayed by Kelvin Fletcher. In July 2014, Winward backed an Andy and Katie upcoming reunion stating: "I think Katie and Andy always end up going back to each other, so it wasn't a surprise at all. It's quite nice actually, because I think they've both grown up a lot since the last time they were together. They're almost like new people."

=== Mineshaft accident ===
On 6 November 2012, it was announced that an upcoming storyline would see Katie fall into a mineshaft after having an argument with husband Declan. Jason Merrells who plays Katie's husband Declan Macey commented on the storyline saying: "Declan is absolutely in bits – he's a complete mess. He realises that he was being silly by arguing so much with Katie, and now he could have lost her completely. He goes into a meltdown about it." Winward also revealed: "At first, Katie thinks there's a possibility of getting out because Declan throws a rope down and also tries to pull her up with his coat. But Declan's attempts to rescue her don't work and then she actually falls deep down into the mine. After that, Katie realises that she doesn't have much hope of getting out unless she takes action herself."

=== Departure ===
After thirteen years in the role, Winward chose to leave Emmerdale in 2014 to pursue other acting projects. Her departure was announced on 28 November 2014 and her exit was scheduled for the following year. Show bosses teased that Katie would depart in a "sensational, not-to-be missed storyline". One of the character's final stories features her remarrying Andy as part of the show's Christmas episodes.

== Reception ==
For her portrayal of Katie, Winward earned a nomination for Most Popular Newcomer at the 8th National Television Awards. Winward was nominated in the category of Sexiest Female at both the 2011 and 2013 British Soap Awards.
