= Pearl Ladderbanks =

Fictional character from Emmerdale

- Emmerdale character
- Portrayed by: Meg Johnson
- Duration: 2003–2020
- First appearance: Episode 3500; 30 July 2003
- Last appearance: Episode 8770; 30 March 2020
- Introduced by: Keith Richardson
In-universe information
- Occupation: Receptionist
- Husband: Ted Ladderbanks (backstory)
- Sons: Frank Bernard Hartbourne
- Grandsons: Owen Hartbourne
- Granddaughters: Nadine Hartbourne

Pearl Ladderbanks (also Hartbourne) is a fictional character from the British ITV soap opera Emmerdale, played by Meg Johnson. She first appeared on the show in episode 3500 on 30 July 2003. Pearl's storylines included defending her rapist son Frank Bernard Hartbourne (Rob Parry), being trapped in a fire during the Sugden house explosion, developing a gambling addiction, committing embezzlement in order to feed her gambling and faking Alzheimer's disease to prevent her addiction from being revealed.

Johnson took an extended break from her role as Pearl during 2019, with Pearl last appearing on 18 July 2019. Pearl was off-screen until 13 January 2020, when it was revealed on-screen that she had been away from the village on a caravan holiday. The character made a handful of guest appearances until the COVID-19 pandemic in the United Kingdom caused the character to stop appearing due to Johnson's age. Her last appearance aired on 30 March 2020.

In the episode broadcast on 1 April 2024 it was announced that Pearl had died off-screen with Rhona Goskirk receiving a letter from Pearl’s grandson Owen informing her of her death.

== Storylines ==
Pearl arrived in the village and catches Len Reynolds (Peter Martin) and Jarvis Skelton (Richard Moore)'s attention. She is wrongfully branded a "trollop" by Edna Birch (Shirley Stelfox). Pearl and Len eventually get together and Len proposes to her. She accepts and the couple settle down together. However, their relationship is tested when Pearl's son Frank Bernard Hartbourne (Rob Parry), who she had claimed was a financial advisor, is released from prison after completing a sentence for rape. Len considers ending his marriage with Pearl but agrees to stand by her. Frank Bernard stays with Len and Pearl in the village, but his arrival is announced in the local paper and the villagers turn against Pearl and Len, leaving only vicar Ashley Thomas (John Middleton) standing by them. Frank is then beat up, and realising that his presence is harming his mother, he moves away. Pearl and Len also contemplate moving away due to the village's treatment of them, but are persuaded to stay and rebuild their lives.

When she begins working at Eric Pollard's (Chris Chittell) factory, Pearl makes friends with fellow seamstresses Del Dingle (Hayley Tamaddon) and Val Lambert (Charlie Hardwick). She is delighted when her grandson Owen (Oliver Lee) – son of her son Frank – visits. Owen and his mother live in Hong Kong and put Pearl in a difficult position when he asks where his father is buried. Pearl tells Owen the truth about his father and Owen admits that he already knew, having found the details on the internet. Pearl and Owen then become close. Having started using the internet for email, Pearl finds a get-rich-quick scheme and invests. She later discovers it is a scam. Having got her friends to inves too, Pearl feels obliged to pay them herself. She borrows money from Eric and is soon in debt. When Len finds out, he is horrified but helps to pay it off, thinking the matter is resolved. However, he is unaware that Eric is blackmailing Pearl over an early payment penalty clause in the contract she had signed. Horrified by the mess she has created, Pearl secretly leaves the village, leaving her engagement ring and a letter for Len.

Eventually, Pearl is found working in Leeds under a false name, Irene. After her picture appears in the paper, her boss confronts her and he tries convincing her to ring home. She does so after bumping into Daz Eden (Luke Tittensor), bruised and running away from his mother and her boyfriend. They agree to return to the village together and over time, the villagers grow to trust Pearl again. Len eventually dies, leaving Pearl overcome with grief. When Douglas Potts (Duncan Preston), Laurel Thomas' (Charlotte Bellamy) father, is grieving after the death of his grandson, Pearl supports him. Edna and Betty are concerned about her intentions and Edna advises Pearl not to visit Doug. She realises what Edna is implying and is furious. The arrival of Vanessa Woodfield (Michelle Hardwick) annoys Pearl, as Vanessa is constantly trying to force her into leaving her job as the vet receptionist because of her age. The feud escalates when it is discovered that Rhona Goskirk (Zoe Henry) has been taking drugs supplied by Vanessa.

Pearl later develops an online gambling addiction. She receives large bills that need paying and resorts to stealing from Paddy Kirk (Dominic Brunt) and Rhona and writes down what she owes in a book which Vanessa finds. Edna confronts Pearl about her stealing and Paddy and Rhona later discover her betrayal. Paddy fires Pearl from the vet's. She repays them and tells Edna that she plans to leave the village. Edna alerts Paddy and Rhona and they intervene in Pearl's plan and reconcile. Following her gambling, Eric kicks Pearl out of her home and she goes to live with Paddy and Rhona.

== Development ==
=== Casting and characterisation ===
In 2003, it was revealed that Edna Birch, portrayed by Shirley Stelfox, was to get a new sparring partner. Meg Johnson, who had previously appeared in Brookside and Coronation Street, was cast in the role of Pearl Ladderbanks. Johnson promised that Pearl's arrival would put Edna's nose out of joint also saying: "Edna is shocked at her brashness and how she flirts with the men. Pearl won't stand any messing though and she’s quite rude to Edna, but in a funny way." It was also revealed that Pearl would make an impression in the community in other ways, such as her wild dress sense. Johnson explained: "It's outrageous! She loves flowery and colourful clothes – there’s a lot of pink in her wardrobe. You never see Pearl out without her face on and her hair done."

Pearl forms an attraction to Len Reynolds (Peter Martin). Martin explained: "When Pearl turns up on the scene, she's this glamorous older lady with designs on Len and to be honest with you, I think he's a bit frightened of her. It's a long time since his wife died, and he's not used to female attention, so he just wants to run a mile and Len prefers Edna, despite her reputation as village battle-ax. His feelings for her have developed over time. Everyone else thinks she's a witch, but Len sees a good side to her, and really likes her."

=== Break and departure ===
Johnson took an extended break from Emmerdale in 2019. The break was written in as Pearl going on a caravan holiday. Shortly after her return, the COVID-19 pandemic occurred and, due to her age, Johnson was considered too vulnerable to continue filming. Her final appearance aired on 30 March 2020 in scenes that see Pearl express her independence by moving away to live in a caravan. Johnson died on 1 July 2023, having never returned to Emmerdale due to her declining health.

== Reception ==
After Johnson's death on 1 July 2023, the Daily Mirror noted how Pearl was a fan favourite. They described her as a "diminutive powerhouse". In 2024, Chloe Timms from Inside Soap wrote that she "adored" Pearl, adding, "I always aspired to be like Pearl when I got older". That same year, following the character being killed off, Timms' colleague Laura-Jayne Tyler wrote "RIP, dear Pearl. Forever in our hearts." Tyler had previously joked in 2019 that Pearl was a "Style Icon", calling her "Elle Woods with a pension book".
