= Daniel Coll =

British actor (born 1961)

- Born: 1961 (age 64–65)
- Education: Mountview Academy of Theatre Arts
- Occupations: Actor; Film director
- Known for: Playing recurring character DI Frank Blackmore in ITV's Emmerdale
- Awards: Best Director, Los Angeles Independent Film Festival (2012)

Daniel Coll (born 1961) is an English actor and film director best known for playing the recurring character DI Frank Blackmore in ITV's Emmerdale.

== Education ==
Coll trained at Mountview Academy of Theatre Arts.

Coll is a graduate of Sheffield Hallam University with an MA in filmmaking.

== Career ==
Coll is currently producing Falcon a detective thriller to star Peter Andre, Noah Huntley and Victoria Ekanoye set in Malta and Gozo - it is set distribution in 2025. Has previously made frequent appearances in Coronation Street and Heartbeat. He was in Mel Gibson's Braveheart. Daniel Coll was one of the original dads in Billy Elliot the Musical in London's West End and played Tim in the movie Bullseye; he was also Enjolras in Les Misérables on the UK tour 1992/4. He is also a director and producer and co wrote the musical Pinocchio starring Liam Mower.

Coll made his film directorial debut with The Tragedy of Macbeth released in 2012 starring Oliver Tobias and which won for him Best Director in the Los Angeles Independent Film Festival 2012. Coll appeared at the Cheltenham Literature Festival on 9 October 2012 to discuss The Tragedy of Macbeth, following a premiere of the film.

From 2020 he appeared in Dan and Paddy’s Bucket list-Kyushu Japan with co-host, Irish Traveller and TV reality star, Paddy Doherty exploring Kyushu in which they partook in challenges along the way.

As of 2022, Coll owns Picture Point Films, as a director. The company is working on Gemini, Rural Cut, Gibraltar the Untold Story and The Rose.

== Filmography ==
Year	Title	Role	Notes
1990	Bullseye!	Tim	
1995	Braveheart	Captain York Castle	
2012	The Tragedy of Macbeth		Director
2014	Northern Soul	Yarwood	
2018	The More You Ignore Me	Jim	Post-production
