= Lewis Linford =

British actor (born 1987)

Lewis Smales
- Born: 1987 (age 38–39); Swanland, East Riding of Yorkshire, England
- Occupation: Actor
- Years active: 2008-present

Lewis Smales (stage name Linford; born 1987) is a British actor. A native of Swanland, East Riding of Yorkshire, England, Smales is probably best known for playing gamekeeper Lee Naylor in the British television soap Emmerdale.

In 2010, Smales appeared in the third series of The Inbetweeners.

He began his career playing the part of Wayne Broody in John Godber's BAFTA award-winning BBC drama Oddsquad.

Smales has appeared on stage at the Hull Truck Theatre in John Godber's play Up 'n' Under.

== Sexual assault trial and acquittal ==
In August 2009, Smales was tried at Kingston upon Hull Crown Court for the alleged sexual assault of a 20-year-old female boxer in a nightclub in Kingston upon Hull. The incident was alleged to have occurred in Hull's Pozition night club in 2007, two years before Smales appeared on Emmerdale. Smales was acquitted of the charge and later appeared in the media arguing for the anonymity of accused males in rape trials.
