= Shadrach Dingle =

Fictional character from Emmerdale

- Emmerdale character
- Portrayed by: Andy Devine (2000–2010); Matt Sutton (2017 flashback)
- Duration: 2000, 2002–2010, 2017
- First appearance: 30 March 2000
- Last appearance: 17 November 2017
- Introduced by: Keith Richardson (2000, 2002); Iain MacLeod (2017)
In-universe information
- Father: Jedediah Dingle
- Mother: Peg Dingle
- Brothers: Zak Dingle; Albert Dingle; Caleb Dingle; Ezra Dingle; Zebediah Dingle
- Wife: Faith Dingle (until 2000)
- Daughters: Chas Dingle; Gennie Walker
- Adoptive sons: Cain Dingle
- Grandsons: Aaron Dingle
- Granddaughters: Grace Dingle; Eve Dingle; Molly Sharma
- Uncles: Bert Dingle
- Nephews: Ben Dingle; Butch Dingle; Sam Dingle; Marlon Dingle; Eli Dingle
- Nieces: Tina Dingle; Belle Dingle; Mandy Dingle; Lilith Dingle; Del Dingle
- First cousins: Solomon Dingle; Elvis Dingle
- Other relatives: Marilyn Dingle; Charity Dingle; Debbie Dingle

Shadrach Dingle is a fictional character from the British ITV soap opera Emmerdale. Shadrach Dingle was played by Andy Devine whose character debuted during 2674th episode of Emmerdale which aired on 30 March 2000. Since early 2010, the character appeared occasionally on an episodic basis after Devine felt he could not keep up with the busy schedule. The character, who had alcohol-induced liver disease, was killed off on 23 July 2010 after collapsing into a river and drowning whilst attempting to retrieve some beer cans. He was written out of the show due to the actor's retirement at age 68. Shadrach made an unannounced return in a flashback on 17 November 2017.

== Casting ==
In 2010, it was announced that Andy Devine had reduced his number of appearances in the serial after feeling that he could not keep up with the busy schedule at his age (67), but he agreed to appear on an episodic basis returning for key storylines and episodes. On 20 June of that year, it was reported that the character of Shadrach would be killed off on his birthday, reportedly devastating Devine. A friend of the actor said, "Andy thought he would be able to come back every now and then, so to find out that Shadrach will leave Emmerdale in a body bag was a big disappointment." A spokesperson for the soap said "Shadrach will be leaving the village on his birthday but how he goes remains to be seen. However, it's not one to be missed."

Matt Sutton briefly portrayed Shadrach in a special flashback episode that showed the childhood of Shadrach's son Cain Dingle (Jeff Hordley), which was originally broadcast on 17 November 2017.

== Storylines ==
=== 2000–2005 ===
Shadrach first appeared at his nephew Butch's (Paul Loughran) funeral and was so drunk that he fell asleep in church – infuriating his brother, Zak (Steve Halliwell) who was grieving for his son. Zak did not lash out because he believed that he owed Shadrach. When they were younger, Zak had an affair with Shadrach's wife, Faith (Gillian Jephcott). Unknown to them, this resulted in the birth of Cain Dingle (Jeff Hordley). Cain had thought Shadrach was his father and after the truth was revealed, he was shocked to discover the man who'd brought him up was his uncle.

The Dingles weathered this crisis, but when Zak went to South America in search of the Dingle fortune, Shadrach begged Zak's wife, Lisa (Jane Cox), to take him in. Sticking to the Dingle code of loyalty, Lisa agreed, and Shadrach spent the next few months trying to seduce her. Order was restored when Zak returned but Shadrach's behaviour continued to provoke disgust among his family and their neighbours alike. A life of heavy drinking took a toll on Shadrach and his daughter, Chastity (Lucy Pargeter), worried that her father would die of alcoholism-related illnesses. Attempting to wean him off alcohol, Chas bet Zak and Shadrach that they could not stay dry for a month. Shadrach was unable to do so and spent the time, attempting to get his hands on booze. Shadrach's best friend, Fat Pedro, never appeared on screen but often provided horse race betting tips which always lost money.

=== 2006–2010 ===
On 26 August 2007, Shadrach was in the church vestry as he was drinking the communion wine but unaware that heavily pregnant Laurel Thomas (Charlotte Bellamy) was also in the church, fast asleep. Emily Kirk (Kate McGregor) had locked the doors, unaware that they were there when he and Laurel realised that she was in labour. Shadrach rang the church bells to alert the village and supported Laurel until help arrived. After Daniel was born, Shadrach showed him more love than he had any of the Dingle children and was over the moon when Laurel asked him to be godfather. Shadrach adored his godson, surprising everybody who knew him; he gave Daniel presents and promised to do things with him when he was older. However, Daniel died of sudden infant death syndrome, devastating Shadrach. Shadrach initially blamed himself, thinking that the alcohol fumes he had breathed on Daniel killed him but, supported by Laurel and Diane Sugden (Elizabeth Estensen), he stopped blaming himself. Despite Daniel's death, Shadrach was still loving to him, visiting his grave with flowers and one of his great-nephew, Samson's, old teddy bears to keep Daniel company.

In spring 2008, Laurel and Ashley learned that they had been given the wrong child at the hospital and their son had been given to Greg (Shaun Prendergast) and Melanie Doland (Caroline Strong). The hospital broke the news to Greg, following a DNA test, that their biological son had been given to Ashley and Laurel Thomas. After months of turmoil, the court gave custody of Arthur Doland to Laurel and Ashley. Shadrach was initially reluctant to see the child, feeling this was disrespectful to Daniel's memory. On Arthur's first birthday, Laurel spoke to Shadrach and told him she'd never forget Daniel, but she also loved Arthur. When Shadrach spoke of his memories of helping her give birth to Daniel, she reminded him that it had actually been Arthur. This helped Shadrach come to terms with Daniel's death. Through their shared grief, Laurel and Shadrach became good friends and in March 2008, Shadrach told Laurel that years before, he had an affair with a woman named Shirley Pascoe. Eventually he had decided to leave his wife as Shirley was pregnant but died in childbirth. Their daughter, Genesis Pascoe, was born on 21 November 1987. Shadrach was devastated and put her up for adoption, feeling that he couldn't take her home to Faith. He later regretted it, but it was too late, she had been adopted and Shadrach couldn't have her. Laurel told Chas and, after dealing with her initial hurt and anger, she and Shadrach went to Social Services. They learned Genesis had contacted them, wanting contact with her birth parents. Shadrach later wrote to Genesis, asking her to contact him and they agreed to meet him, but she didn't turn up. Shadrach assumed she'd changed her mind, unaware that she had been injured in a road accident and was in hospital. Shadrach finally met Genesis, now Gennie Walker (Sian Reese-Williams), several weeks later, when Paddy invited her to Eli Dingle's birthday party. Shadrach was drunk and made a pass at her, horrifying Gennie when she realized that he was her birth father. Later, she told Paddy that Shadrach was her father, unaware that everyone would hear when the music was suddenly switched off. Gennie fled and Shadrach had to tell Lisa and Zak. Gennie soon returned and wanted to get to know her father. He told her about the circumstances of her birth and adoption and they began to bond. He also tried to reassure Chas who resented the efforts he was making for his new daughter when he was never there for her.

Shadrach fled the village after he flooded the Dingles' bathroom, making the ceiling collapse and Zak threw Shadrach out. He moved into Mill Cottage with Chas and her ex-boyfriend, Carl King (Tom Lister) but Carl became impatient with Shadrach and argued with Chas about letting him stay. Shadrach overheard this and decided to leave. After buying a bottle of wine, Shadrach staggered into the road and was accidentally run over by his nephew, Marlon (Mark Charnock). While in hospital, Shadrach learned that he had liver failure and a perforated ulcer, due to his drinking, and the only thing that would make any difference was to stop drinking. Shadrach didn't listen and continued to drink but when Marlon found out, he demanded Shadrach stop and got rid of all alcoholic drinks. Shadrach took advantage of this and moved in with Marlon. Marlon helped Shadrach realize the good things he had in his life. Shadrach gave up for a few days but on his 62nd birthday, Marlon threw him a party with the whole family invited, having forgiven him for the flooding. However, Shadrach couldn't face his family and went on a drinking binge, much to Marlon's disgust. He threw Shadrach out and told him that he didn't care if Shadrach drank himself to death. Shadrach immediately bought a six pack of beer and while walking over a footbridge, he staggered in pain caused by his liver condition and dropped his cans in the river. While trying to retrieve them, Shadrach lost his balance due to another sharp pain from his liver and drowned in the river. Shadrach was found by Marlon and his girlfriend, Rhona Goskirk (Zoe Henry), and was dragged out of the water but they were unable to save him. Marlon held his uncle's body in his arms, crying. The official cause of death was drowning; however, an autopsy confirmed that Shadrach would have died from a ruptured liver within the next few hours, if he not passed out in the stream and drowned.

Zak was devastated by his brother's death and blamed Marlon by banishing him from the Dingle homestead, locking him out. Angered and hurt at the way he had treated Shadrach over the years, Zak turned violent and got very drunk; Lisa, Cain, Chas and the Dingles helped him through this. Deeply upset, Zak decided to lay Shadrach to rest on the Dingles' land. Following a ceremony conducted by Ashley, the Dingles and Laurel held a private vigil for Shadrach where they all said how much they loved him and what they would remember most about him, each then taking a swig of beer. Following the ceremony, Zak sat by Shadrach's grave and cried, saying only, "I did my best, Brother, I did my best".

In 2016, Aaron went to his graveyard and told him that he had changed his name to Dingle, hoping he was proud of him. In 2017, Cain later mentioned that Shadrach was his father figure to wife Moira Barton.

== Reception ==
The character was selected as one of the "Top 100 British soap characters" by industry experts for a poll to be run by What's on TV, with readers able to vote for their favourite character to discover "Who is Soap's greatest Legend?" Duncan Lindsay from Metro praised Sutton's portrayal of Shadrach in the 2017 flashback episode, writing that Sutton "showed us both familiar sides to Shadrach and exposed sides that had only been alluded to". Laura Denby from Radio Times penned Shadrach as violent and abusive and believed that "the darkness of the character was softened by his bonds with various villagers", though she noted how the 2017 flashback episode showed his abusive side.
