= Sammy Winward =

British actress, singer, model (born 1985)

- Born: Samantha Kate Winward; 12 October 1985 (age 40); Bolton, Greater Manchester, England
- Occupations: Actress; singer; model
- Years active: 2001–present
- Known for: Role of Katie Sugden in Emmerdale
- Spouse: Martyn Hardy (m. 2017)
- Children: 1

Samantha Kate Winward (born 12 October 1985) is an English actress. She is best known for playing Katie Sugden in the ITV soap opera Emmerdale between 2001 and 2015.

== Early life ==
Winward was born in Bolton, Greater Manchester, England. She attended Turton High School in Bromley Cross, South Turton.

== Personal life ==
Winward was engaged to footballer David Dunn. Their daughter, Mia, was born at home in Edgworth, Lancashire on 12 June 2005. Winward and Dunn split in September of that year.

== Career ==
At age 15, Winward began appearing as Katie Sugden in the ITV soap opera Emmerdale. A year after her debut in July 2001, she was nominated for "Most Popular Newcomer" at the National Television Awards. In November 2014, Winward announced that she would leave Emmerdale after 13 years to pursue other projects. Her character died onscreen in February 2015.

In January 2006, Winward participated in the first series of the reality singing competition Soapstar Superstar, finishing in tenth place. Later that year, she was voted #73 on FHM's list of the 100 Sexiest Women in the World.

On the second season of ITV's crime thriller series Prey, Winward appeared as the heavily pregnant Lucy, whose father (Philip Glenister) goes on the run after finding himself on the wrong side of the law. In their review of the second season's third episode, which aired in December 2015, Cultbox commented, "Glenister and [Winward] make a convincing father and daughter pairing and, despite limited screen time, Winward does make you really feel Lucy's distress and fear".

In 2023, Winward played Sonia Sutcliffe—wife of serial killer Peter Sutcliffe—in the critically acclaimed true crime miniseries, The Long Shadow, which marked her return to television after working as an acting teacher.

== Filmography ==
Year	Title	Role	Notes
2001–2015	Emmerdale	Katie Sugden	Series regular
2006	Soapstar Superstar	Herself	Contestant
2015	Prey	Lucy Murdoch	Series regular (season 2)
2017	Lies We Tell	Cheryl	Feature film
2017	Fearless	Siobhan Murphy	2 episodes
2019	Lead Belly	Emma	Short film
2023	The Long Shadow	Sonia Sutcliffe	2 episodes
2023	Five Thousand Stars	Yvonne	Short film
2025	Brassic	Lady in Club	1 episode

== Accolades ==
Year	Work	Association	Category	Result	Ref.
2002	Emmerdale	TV Quick Awards	Best Soap Newcomer	Nominated	
2002	Emmerdale	8th National Television Awards	Most Popular Newcomer	Nominated	
2003	Emmerdale	The British Soap Awards	Sexiest Female	Nominated	
2004	Emmerdale	The British Soap Awards	Sexiest Female	Nominated	
2005	Emmerdale	The British Soap Awards	Sexiest Female	Nominated	
2006	Emmerdale	The British Soap Awards	Sexiest Female	Nominated	
2007	Emmerdale	The British Soap Awards	Sexiest Female	Nominated	
2007	Emmerdale	Inside Soap Awards	Sexiest Female	Nominated	
2008	Emmerdale	Digital Spy Soap Awards	Sexiest Female	Nominated	
2008	Emmerdale	The British Soap Awards	Sexiest Female	Nominated	
2008	Emmerdale	Inside Soap Awards	Sexiest Female	Nominated	
2009	Emmerdale	Inside Soap Awards	Sexiest Female	Nominated	
2010	Emmerdale	The British Soap Awards	Sexiest Female	Nominated	
2011	Emmerdale	The British Soap Awards	Sexiest Female	Nominated	
2011	Emmerdale	Inside Soap Awards	Sexiest Female	Nominated	
2012	Emmerdale	Inside Soap Awards	Sexiest Female	Nominated	
2013	Emmerdale	18th National Television Awards	Outstanding Serial Drama Performance	Longlisted	
2013	Emmerdale	The British Soap Awards	Sexiest Female	Nominated	
2013	Emmerdale	Inside Soap Awards	Sexiest Female	Nominated	
2014	Emmerdale	Inside Soap Awards	Sexiest Female	Nominated	
2021	Lead Belly	Birmingham Film Festival	Best Female Actor	Nominated	
2022	Lead Belly	Romford Film Festival	Best Supporting Actress	Nominated	
