= Paul McEwan (actor) =

British actor (born 1970)

- Born: Paul McEwan; 1970 (age 55–56); Barnsley, West Riding of Yorkshire, England
- Occupation: Actor
- Years active: 1998-present

Paul McEwan is a British actor. He was born in Barnsley in 1970 to Denise and Barry Stephenson. He trained at the Academy of Live and Recorded Arts in London and worked in a call centre to raise funds.

He has had varied television appearances on programmes like Clocking Off, No Angels, Holby City, Casualty, Doctors and Emmerdale for which he is best known as PC Shane Doyle. Since leaving Emmerdale he has appeared as Peter Bleach in the Film "Secret Flight", WPC56 and Eternal Law. He has also performed in plays with the RSC, Manchester Royal Exchange and the Lyric Hammersmith.

== Personal life ==
McEwan grew up in Sheffield.
