= Andy Devine (English actor) =

English actor (1942–2022)

- Born: 28 February 1942; Manchester, Lancashire, England
- Died: 27 January 2022 (aged 79); Southport, Merseyside, England
- Occupation: Actor
- Years active: 1963–2011
- Known for: Emmerdale; Queer as Folk

Peter Devine (28 February 1942 – 27 January 2022), better known as Andy Devine, was a British actor primarily on television, whose best known role was Shadrach Dingle on one of ITV's long-running soap operas, Emmerdale. He played Shadrach on and off starting in 2000 and made his final appearance in July 2010. His credits have occasionally been confused with those of the American actor Andy Devine (1905–1977). Devine served in the Royal Navy for eight years after joining at aged 17 in 1959. He was also a classical actor before going into the soaps.

== Career ==
Devine began his acting career in 1963. He mainly had minor roles, such as an uncredited Draconian Guard in several episodes of the Doctor Who story Frontier in Space. He also had a memorably prominent role as a gay man in the Channel 4 series Queer As Folk, and he appeared in an episode of Linda Green, playing the eponymous lead character's abrasive and lecherous boss Syd Jenkins. He also performed his Emmerdale character Shadrach Dingle character on the ITV show Harry Hill's TV Burp.

On 23 July 2010, Devine left Emmerdale after over ten years on the soap, when Shadrach was killed off in an emotional storyline related to alcohol abuse.

== Personal life and death ==
Devine died in Southport Hospital on 27 January 2022, at the age of 79, as a result of "hospital-acquired pneumonia", following a fall at his home.

== Filmography ==
Year	Title	Role	Notes
1963	Comedy Playhouse	Unknown	Episode: "A Clerical Error"
1963	Maigret	Extra	Episode: "Peter the Lett"; uncredited
1967	Softly, Softly	Chief Constable	Episode: "Selection"; uncredited
1969	Z-Cars	Warder	Episode: "Alibi: Part 1"
1969	Callan	Brezhevski	Episode: "The Little Bits and Pieces of Love"
1970	Doomwatch	Man	Episode: "Spectre at the Feast"; uncredited
1972	Emma	Cole's Manservant	TV mini-series
1972	Villains	Man	Episode: "Belinda"; uncredited
1972	Villains	Warder	Episode: "Billy Boy"; uncredited
1973	Doctor Who	Draconian Guard	4 episodes; uncredited
1992	The Girl From Tomorrow	Mr. Corbett	Episode: "A Primitive and Dangerous Time"
1993	Three Seven Eleven	Mr. Pudsey	2 episodes
1993	Cracker	Guard on Train	Episode: "The Mad Woman in the Attic: Part 1"
1994	In Suspicious Circumstances	George Barnard	Episode: "The Boaster"
1995	Coronation Street	Photographer	Episode #1.3924
1996	Cardiac Arrest	Eric	Episode: "The Body Electric"
1996	Out of the Blue	Jackson Hanley	Series 2: Episode 5
1996	Prime Suspect	Gravefaced Reporter	Episodes: "Errors of Judgement: Parts 1 & 2"
1996	Hillsborough	Additional Cast	Television film
1996	The Moonstone	Landlord	Television film
1997	Where the Heart Is	Dougie Walford	Episode: "Summoned by Bells"
1997	The Lakes	Bus Driver	Series 1: Episode 4
1997	My Son the Fanatic	Comedian	Film
1998	Emmerdale	Baz Bradstone	2 episodes
1998	The Cops	Minibus Driver	Series 1: Episode 3
1999–2000	Queer as Folk	Bernard Thomas	All 10 episodes
1999	Dockers	Meat Salesman	Television film
2000, 2002–2010	Emmerdale	Shadrach Dingle	Series regular; 645 episodes
2000	Coronation Street	Jason Ross	5 episodes
2001	Merseybeat	Bobby Miller	Episode: "Step by Step"
2001	Linda Green	Syd Jenkins	Episode: "Sexual Harassment"
2002	An Angel for May	Drunken Man	Television film
2003	Grease Monkeys	Len	Episode: "The Cut and Shut"
2007	Harry Hill's TV Burp	Shadrach Dingle	Series 6: Episode 3
2011	Monroe	Mr. Ashton	Series 1: Episode 3
2011	Doctors	Dennis Dowling	Episode: "Footsteps"
