= Deena Payne =

British actress (born 1954)

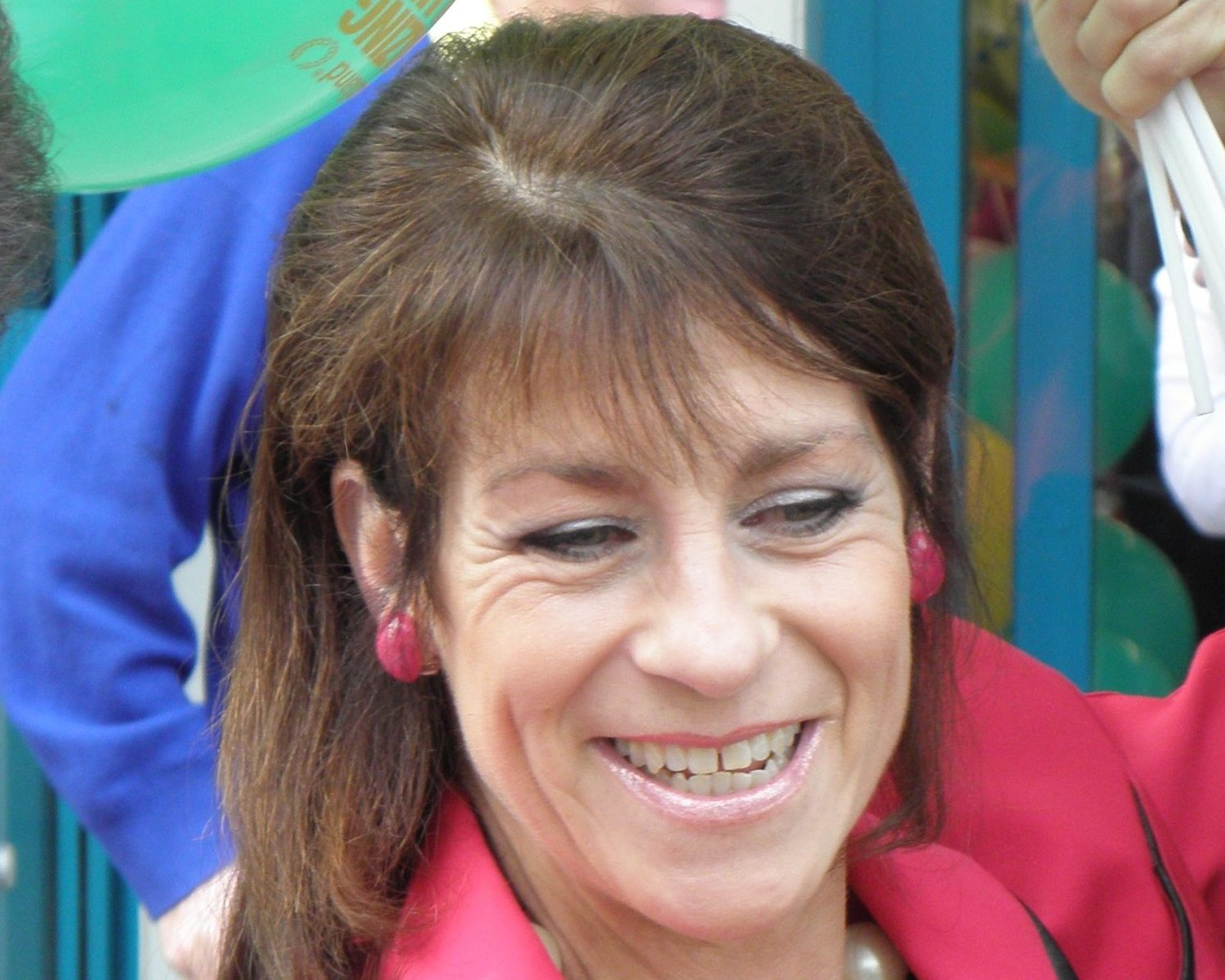
- Payne in 2010
- Born: Diane Margaret Payne; 29 August 1954 (age 71); Orpington, Kent, England
- Occupations: Actress; singer
- Years active: 1976–present
- Known for: Emmerdale (1993–2011)
- Children: 1

Diane Margaret "Deena" Payne (born 29 August 1954) is an English actress and former singer. She is best known for playing Viv Hope in the long-running ITV soap opera Emmerdale.

== Life and career ==
Payne was born in Orpington, Kent. She used to tour with ex-Animals keyboard player Alan Price as a backing singer and she was a member of the novelty girl band Cats U.K., who scored a UK top 30 hit with "Luton Airport" in October 1979. She was also one of the dancers in Rock Follies of '77. Before Emmerdale, Payne had acted in episodes of Tales of Sherwood Forest and The Bill. She has also appeared in Lily Savage's Blankety Blank.

Her Emmerdale character was written out of the series in 2011 after 18 years, dying in her sleep during a fire, as the bosses felt the character had run its course. Since leaving Emmerdale, Payne has returned to the stage, appearing in Calendar Girls and various pantomimes. Most recently, she featured on the television show True Crime as the character Irene. In 2020, she appeared in an episode of the BBC soap opera Doctors as Patricia Taymount.

== Filmography ==
Year	Title	Role	Notes
1977	Rock Follies of '77	Dancer	Episodes: "The Band That Wouldn't Die" and "Empire"
1989	Tales of Sherwood Forest	Louise	Episode: "Stag Night"
1991	The Bill	Diana Corbin	Episode: "Inside Job"
1993–2011	Emmerdale	Viv Windsor (later Hope)	1,328 episodes
2012	Crime Stories	Irene Harper	Series 1, episode 8
2020	Doctors	Patricia Taymount	Episode: "Targeted Individual"

== Awards and nominations ==
Year	Award	Category	Result	Ref.
2003	The British Soap Awards	Best Actress	Nominated	
2005	The British Soap Awards	Best Comedy Performance	Nominated	
2006	The British Soap Awards	Best On-Screen Partnership (shared with Tony Audenshaw)	Nominated	
2007	Inside Soap Awards	Best Couple (shared with Audenshaw)	Nominated	
2008	Digital Spy Soap Awards	Best On-Screen Partnership (shared with Audenshaw)	Nominated	
