= Keith Richardson (television executive) =

British television executive

- Occupation: TV Producer

Keith Richardson is a British television executive who is Controller of Drama for ITV Yorkshire. He was executive producer of the station's primetime soap, Emmerdale, for 24 years, during which time he oversaw its transformation from a minor, daytime, rural drama into one of the UK's major soap operas. He left Emmerdale in January 2009 and was succeeded by one of his former series producers, Steve November. He executive produced the TV film Falling for ITV1 in 2005.
