= Hari Prasad =

Fictional character from Emmerdale

- Emmerdale character
- Portrayed by: John Nayagam
- Duration: 2005–2007
- First appearance: 5 December 2005
- Last appearance: 26 July 2007
- Introduced by: Kathleen Beedles
In-universe information
- Occupation: Veterinarian

Hari Prasad is a fictional character from British ITV soap opera Emmerdale, played by John Nayagam. He made his first on-screen appearance on 5 December 2005.

== Development ==
In November 2005, an Inside Soap columnist reported that John Nayagam had joined the cast as vet Hari Prasad. Producer Kathleen Beedles said the character would be popular with the ladies of the village, and praised Nayagam for being "a wonderfully charismatic actor". Hari was introduced as an old university friend of Paddy Kirk's (Dominic Brunt), who buys into his veterinary practice to save it from going under. A writer from What's on TV described Hari as a "slippery vet" and "a real charmer and would like to be a millionaire playboy but his current wage packet frustrates his ambitions".

In the lead-up to Nayagam's exit, Hari becomes involved in Tom King (Kenneth Farrington) 's murder trial. Louise Appleton (Emily Symons), Hari's girlfriend threatens to go to the police. Naygam told Aoife Anderson of the Irish Independent: "To protect himself, he needs to stop her talking, at any price. "He’s relieved when he manages to run her off the road, but he’s terrified that she’s going to wake up from her coma and talk to the police".

== Storylines ==
Hari arrives in the village and reconnects with Paddy Kirk, a university colleague with whom he had parted ways after a business disagreement. The two men make peace and after initial hesitation, agree to go into partnership in Paddy's veterinary practive, which is suffering due to rumours that Paddy was responsible for the death of Sandra (Sally Ann Matthews) and Craig Briggs' (Nick Stanley) entire flock of sheep. Over time, Hari and Paddy rebuild the business. Hari is the object of many female villagers' affections; Toni Daggert (Kerry Stacey) flirts with him, but he rejects her advances. He then tries to match Paddy with Toni, but she is still attracted to Hari. Hari also clashes with Jo Stiles (Roxanne Pallett) over her unsuitable work attire and attitude.

Perdita Hyde-Sinclair (Georgia Slowe) flirts with Hari and he initially reciprocates, before realising that she is using him to make her husband, Grayson Sinclair (Christopher Villiers), jealous. Nonetheless, Hari and Perdy remain friends and Hari goes into business with Grayson, tending to the Alpacas at Oakwell Hall. Hari and Grayson plan to buy a racehorse together but Grayson backs out, leaving Hari to raise funds to cover Grayson's share, which results in him taking money from the practice. The horse has to be put down on its first run, leaving Hari unable to replace the money. Grayson's mother, Rosemary King (Linda Thorson) gives him the money, on the understanding that he will repay her with a favour at a later date. The favour is to tell the police that he heard the King brothers discussing how they had murdered their father, Rosemary's late husband Tom, and find someone to verify his story. Hari persuades Louise to provide a statement but she deduces that he is lying.

During the village's 500th Anniversary, Hari kidnaps Scarlett Nicholls (Kelsey-Beth Crossley) and runs Louise off the road while she is on her way to change her statement about the Kings. Hari then corners Louise in hospital, blaming her for losing everything as the prosecution have dropped the case against the brothers. Louise insults him, prompting Harry to attempt to smother her with a pillow. Interrupted by a nurse and doctor, Hari tries to flee but is eventually arrested and jailed. When Rita Brannigan (Emma Kearney) discovers some financial irregularities at the vets, Paddy visits Hari on remand to buy his share of the practice, but Hari's offer is over the odds. Three weeks later, Matthew King (Matt Healy) visits Hari and blackmails him into raising his asking price. Hari sells his share to Rosemary, and following her death on Christmas Day 2007, her interest passes to Grayson.
