= Tom King (Emmerdale) =

Fictional character from Emmerdale

- Emmerdale character
- Portrayed by: Kenneth Farrington
- Duration: 2004–2006
- First appearance: 29 February 2004
- Last appearance: 27 December 2006
- Created by: Steve Frost
- Spin-off appearances: Emmerdale: Text Santa special (2013)
In-universe information
- Occupation: Businessman
- Father: Albert King
- Wife: Mary King (backstory); Rosemary King (2006)
- Sons: Jimmy King; Matthew King; Carl King; Max King
- Daughters: Scarlett Nicholls
- Grandsons: Thomas King; Elliot Windsor; Carl Holliday
- Granddaughters: Anya King; Angelica King
- Aunts: Phyllis King

Tom King is a fictional character from the British television soap opera Emmerdale, who appeared on the show from 29 February 2004 before being killed off on 25 December 2006 in a long-running "whodunit" storyline dubbed, "Who Killed Tom King?". He was last seen on 27 December 2006 as a dead body in a morgue. Throughout his time on the show he was portrayed by Kenneth Farrington. Farrington decided to leave the show in 2006 but reprised the role briefly as a ghost in a "Text Santa" special on 20 December 2013.

== Development ==
Farrington was contacted about joining the cast of Emmerdale in late 2003. The offer "came out of the blue", and he said that he never expected to get the role. He was cast as Tom King, the patriarch of the serial's newest family, and introduced alongside his on-screen sons in February 2004. In order to give Tom links to the other characters, it was established that he was "an old friend" of Emmerdale legend Frank Tate (Norman Bowler), whose daughter Zoe Tate (Leah Bracknell) was still in the show. One of Tom's first moves is to offer Zoe "a huge sum" for the Tate family house, Home Farm. Farrington revealed in June 2004 that Tom was meant to die or at least leave the serial after six months, with his sons left to compete for "the King empire." However, he was later told that would not be happening. The King family received a positive reaction from viewers, which pleased Farrington. He said he was happy at Emmerdale, and was content to settle down and stay for as long as he was needed. This was in contrast to his role of Billy Walker in fellow soap Coronation Street, which saw him make several returns and exits, as he was "fed up" of playing just one character.

One of the character's first major storylines was a romance with his secretary, the much younger Charity Tate (Emma Atkins). After a few months, Tom proposes to Charity who accepts. Farrington admitted that when he first read the scripts and saw that Tom was going to propose, he was "embarrassed" as he thought the age gap between the pair was too big. He found it "pretty arrogant" for a 65 year old man to consider himself a possibility for such a young woman. He explained "When you reach that age, you have a fear of rejection – I know because I've passed it! You wouldn't put yourself forward for a relationship, let alone with a young woman, in case they said no." Farrington justified the proposal with the fact that Charity is the one who has done all the chasing. He also thought Charity had been clever in the way she got Tom, saying she had made "a big impression" on his character with the way she stands her ground and how she has made something of herself, which Tom respects. Before the proposal, Charity returns to work after being unfairly sacked for stealing. Farrington said she is aloof with Tom, which frustrates him as he does not like being ignored. He later witnesses her flirting with Syd Woolfe (Nathan Gladwell). Helen Crossley of Inside Soap stated that Tom's proposal is not prompted by jealousy, but rather he thinks that Charity could do more with her life than flirt with all the men in the village. Farrington told her that Tom feels like he is in a position to save Charity from "the futureless existence of being a Dingle". He added "I wouldn't say they're romantically in love, but he does have a deep fondness for her. And, of course, Charity's thrilled because her meal ticket's come in!" The storyline pushed Farrington and his character to the forefront of Emmerdale for June/July.

Farrington's departure from the serial was announced on 8 August 2006. He cited his desire to move on from the role, having stayed longer than the six months he had originally planned for. He added that he had enjoyed his time with the show. Series producer Kathleen Beedles stated: "Ken has been an asset to the show and will be greatly missed but his exit storyline is going to be extremely dramatic and memorable for viewers, which we're very excited about." Digital Spy's Kris Green said rumours about how Tom's exit storyline would play out included him being shot or "catapulted through a church window." He reported that a source had told him that the character's exit would be "one to remember".

== Storylines ==
Tom goes to the local graveyard to lay flowers on the grave of his late wife, Mary, who had died in 1986. Marlon Dingle (Mark Charnock) does the same, leading to the pair talking about their late wives, and Tom reveals that he had grown up in Emmerdale, where his father ran a successful business, and he was keen to return. Tom, founder of his own haulage firm, eventually decides to move back to Emmerdale, but has trouble re-establishing his haulage firm there. To get some inside information on his key competitor, Tate Haulage, Tom sends his son Carl King (Tom Lister) to get a job there and act as a spy. When Carl finds out that Tate Haulage plans to bid for a valuable contract, Tom undercuts them to win it, moving himself, his family and his haulage firm into Emmerdale. Tom runs King & Sons with his sons, Jimmy (Nick Miles), Matthew (Matt Healy) and Carl, while Jimmy's ambitious ex-wife Sadie King (Patsy Kensit) also proves influential.

After the Kings establish themselves as the new top dogs of the village, replacing the Tates, Tom begins a relationship with the much younger widow Charity Dingle (Emma Atkins). However, while Charity genuinely cares for Tom, he has trouble believing an attractive young woman is really interested in him and not his money – especially as most of the village believes Charity had married her late husband Chris Tate (Peter Amory) for the same reason. Things change when Tom's close friend Roger Dyson (Malcolm Terris) dies of a heart attack while playing golf. Deciding life is too short, Tom proposes to Charity, who accepts. They hold an engagement party in The Woolpack, however, Tom's family, particularly Sadie, are less than impressed, fearing Tom will leave his fortune to Charity rather than them.

On the day of the wedding, Sadie gives Tom photos of Charity kissing her cousin and former lover Cain Dingle (Jeff Hordley). Tom jilts Charity at the altar, sparking a fight between the Kings and the Dingle family. Tom is convinced Sadie is the only person out for his best interests; however, Charity is determined to clear her name. To hurt both Tom and Sadie, Charity seduces Jimmy and secretly records him admitting to how Sadie set her up. At Jimmy's 40th birthday party, Charity marches in and plays the video. Tom is furious with Sadie and begs Charity to take him back, but she refuses, saying that she no longer loves him. She then leaves Emmerdale.

After returning for the wedding, Tom's youngest son Max (Charlie Kemp) prepares to leave Emmerdale to continue his around-the-world trip with his girlfriend Amy Carter (Bethany Webb). Keen to keep his son in Emmerdale, Tom persuades local vet Paddy Kirk (Dominic Brunt) to give Max a job, with Tom covering his salary. Max subsequently breaks up with Amy and moves into Holdgate Farm with Tom, Matthew and Carl. However, when he later discovers the truth, Max becomes tired of his father dictating his life and plans to flee the village with friend Robert Sugden (Karl Davies). The plan ends in tragedy when Robert crashes the car, which explodes with Max inside, killing him instantly. Tom is devastated when he realises he virtually drove his youngest son to his death.

Determined to get back into Tom's good books, Sadie blackmails Zoe Tate (Bracknell) into selling Home Farm – the Tate family home, which Tom dreamed of owning – to Tom. However, in an act of revenge, Zoe deliberately sabotages the gas pipes and the house explodes just as the Kings arrive, leaving Tom with a huge refurbishment bill. Tom lets Sadie back into the family fold and, with Sadie's marriage to Jimmy in tatters, Tom begins to wonder if her feelings for him are more than those of a "daughter". Tom confides in Sadie that he is considering retiring and handing over the business to one of his sons. Sadie steers Tom towards placing Matthew in charge.

As Matthew is a much better businessman than Jimmy, Sadie gets her way when Tom decides to hand the business over to Matthew. However, just as Tom is about to sign the deal, Jimmy arrives and reveals Matthew and Sadie are having an affair. Tom does not believe Jimmy at first, but when Tom mistakenly believes Sadie is making a romantic advance towards him, Matthew reveals the truth. Matthew does not believe Sadie was not pursuing Tom, and when Tom makes Matthew choose between Sadie and the business, he choses the business. However, when Sadie subsequently marries the rich Alasdair Sinclair (Ray Coulthard) for his money, Matthew realises he cannot live without her and begs her for another chance, saying he will give up the business if he has to. Faced with potentially losing another son, Tom accepts Matthew and Sadie as a couple.

Tom's next business venture is a housing development called Kings River. The village residents are divided, as most of them cannot afford the prices the Kings are asking. To get around the opposition, Carl raffles off the showhouse and rigs the competition for local couple Marlon and Donna Windsor-Dingle (Verity Rushworth) to win, creating goodwill in the community. However, Jimmy cuts corners during the development, and the showhouse is destroyed by a gas explosion at the launch of the development, killing Dawn Woods (Julia Mallam), Noreen Bell (Jenny Tomasin), and David Brown (Peter Alexander). Jimmy is trapped in the house, along with Sadie, who attempts to kill him. Jimmy survives, and when Matthew discovers what happened, he ends his relationship with Sadie. She then plots with Cain to kidnap Tom and demand a £2.5 million ransom. When he takes Tom hostage, Cain fakes kidnapping Sadie too, even shooting and supposedly killing her to show he means business. Tom is traumatised, but after his sons pay the ransom, it is revealed Sadie's "death" was a stunt. Cain flees Emmerdale with the money, double-crossing Sadie in the process and forcing her to leave the village penniless.

Following the kidnapping and the failure of Kings River, Tom finds himself in dire financial straits. He decides to marry the seemingly wealthy Rosemary Sinclair (Linda Thorson). They proceeded to form a romantic partnership together as Rosemary grows interested in Tom's proposal. Matthew discovers that Rosemary's estate had been liquidated a year ago; Rosemary confirms to Tom that she is deeply in debt, stating that he was the better off between the two of them. Despite learning of her secret, Tom goes ahead with the engagement. By then, Rosemary's son Grayson Sinclair (Christopher Villiers) – who was worried he would be pushed aside by the King Brothers – was warming up to Tom. However, their relationship soon becomes strained when Rosemary confides in Tom that Grayson has had affairs with men behind his wife Perdita's (Georgia Slowe) back. Tom later jokes about the revelation with his old friend and local police superintendent Charles Vaughan (Richard Cole), antagonising Grayson in the process.

In the lead up to his wedding to Rosemary on Christmas Day, Tom makes further enemies. He is outraged to learn that Carl has reunited Chas Dingle (Lucy Pargeter), who he believes is not good enough for his son – particularly as Tom had earlier accused Chas of abetting Cain with his kidnapping incident. When Chas grows uncomfortable with how Tom is neglecting responsibility for the house collapse, he bullies and later bribes her into breaking things off with Carl before throwing her out of Home Farm. When his loyal secretary Edna Birch (Shirley Stelfox) learns the truth about the Kings' alleged involvement in the house collapse, Tom blackmails her with the knowledge that she is the aunt of Peter (Philip Bird) – and not his mother as he believes. Refusing to be blackmailed by Tom, Edna tells Peter the truth and delivers her evidence of the Kings' negligence to the Health and Safety Executive, prompting them to investigate Tom and his sons. However, the family are quick to cover their tracks prior to the HSE's arrival – rendering Edna's evidence futile – and the organisation are forced to leave Tom and his sons alone under the threat of facing arrest for harassment. In the wake of these events, Edna becomes a recluse, which angers her friend Len Reynolds (Peter Martin) and he confronts Tom. They have a brief fistfight and Len warns Tom he will get his comeuppance one day. In the meantime, Tom infuriates Dawn's father Bob Hope (Tony Audenshaw) by refusing to take responsibility for the house collapse. Tom offers Bob £100,000 as compensation to drop any further action; Bob refuses to accept it, but after Tom increases the offer, Dawn's mother Jean Hope (Susan Penhaligon) takes the money and flees the country with her grandson TJ Woods (Connor Lee). Bob burns down the King & Sons billboard sign, while Bob and Jean's son Jamie Hope (Alex Carter) blames Tom for the loss of both his mother and sister. Dawn's ex-husband Terry Woods (Billy Hartman) – whom Tom had fired as his chauffeur – lashes out at Tom on the day of his wedding and assaults him before leaving in a drunken stupor.

On the day of the wedding, Tom's relationships with Jimmy and Matthew are strained; with Jimmy tired of being treated poorly and Matthew believings Tom will leave everything to Rosemary. Tom further angers the pair when they discover he plans to have Carl take charge of King & Sons upon his earlier retirement. Tom marries Rosemary and they celebrate their wedding at Home Farm, where Jimmy and Matthew confront Carl over their father's plan, they fight; Tom breaks up the brawl and declares Carl will be heir of King & Sons, causing Jimmy and Matthew to expose his one-time affections for Sadie out of spite. As the party resumes, Tom is horrified when Chas arrives in a drunken state and – despite his efforts to prevent her from speaking to his son – she reveals to Carl that he bribed her into ending their relationship; Chas then leaves after telling Tom that he will pay for "breaking her heart". Despite being alienated by his three sons, Tom and Rosemary continue to celebrate until the truth about their respective finances come to light – with Rosemary being shocked to learn that Tom plans to have Carl take charge of his estate rather than her or Grayson. Later on, while the villagers watch fireworks outside of Home Farm, Tom is struck over the head with an ornament and pushed out of his bedroom window by an unseen assailant; Tom dies instantly of a broken neck. He is last seen in the mortuary as a pathologist concludes the post mortem examination of his body, and tells police officers investigating his murder what caused his death.

Following his death, it is revealed that Carl pushed Tom out of the window. Some time later, Carrie Nicholls (Linda Lusardi), a former nurse who looked after Tom's first wife, arrives in the village and reveals that she and Tom have a daughter, Scarlett Nicholls (Kelsey-Beth Crossley). Tom chose not to tell his sons about their half-sister and the last time Tom ever saw Scarlett was when she was a year old.

== Reception ==
For his portrayal of Tom, Farrington was nominated for Best Soap Actor at the 2005 TV Quick & TV Choice Awards. At The British Soap Awards, Charity and Tom's wedding won the Best Single Episode accolade, while Farrington was nominated for Best Actor. The following year, Farrington was one of five actors nominated for Spectacular Scene of the Year for "Home Farm blows up", along with Bracknell, Miles, Kemp and Whipp. In 2007, he received a nomination for Best Actor, while his character was nominated for Villain of the Year and his exit, dubbed "Who killed Tom King?", was nominated for Best Storyline.

Aware of Sadie's scheming ahead of Tom and Charity's wedding, Sarah Moolla of The People reckoned "a happy-ever-after is looking unlikely for the old King and his ex-hooker bride-to-be."

When the character lamented his isolation from the local residents, Imogen Ridgway of the Evening Standard quipped "Um, why do you think that might be? Perhaps it's because his eldest sons lord it over the rest of the villagers. Could it be his unpopular housing development? Even Zoe the nice lesbian blew up his new home." She also pointed out that his involvement in poisoning the cows and ruining Paddy's business had yet to be revealed, so upon learning that Tom was being taken out to dinner in a bid to cheer him up, Ridgeawy stated "Somewhere other than Emmerdale might be a good idea."

Mike Bradley of The Guardian branded Tom "evil" for bringing Peter to the village and forcing Edna to reveal she is not his mother. While discussing how Farrington left Coronation Street as his character became more like the villainous JR Ewing from Dallas, Alan Shaw of the Sunday Post commented "he was more than happy to be the evil Ewing's equivalent in Emmerdale!"

The character's exit was named as one of the "Top 5 deaths" of 2006 in an Inside Soap feature, with writers Alison Maloney and Steven Murphy stating: Big-shot businessman Tom may have been a high-flyer, but he dropped like a stone when he tumbled out of a first-floor window at Home Farm."

== See also ==
- List of soap opera villains
