= Jonny Foster =

Fictional character from Emmerdale

- Emmerdale character
- Portrayed by: Richard Grieve
- Duration: 2007–2009
- First appearance: 22 February 2007
- Last appearance: 27 January 2009
- Created by: Kathleen Beedles
- Introduced by: Kathleen Beedles (2007); Anita Turner (2009)
In-universe information
- Occupation: Farrier
- Father: Sam Foster
- Mother: Patricia Foster
- Civil partner: Paul Lambert (2008–2014)

Jonathan "Jonny" Foster is a fictional character from the British ITV soap opera Emmerdale, played by Richard Grieve. He appeared from 2007 to 2008 and in 2009. Openly gay, in 2008 Jonny enters into a civil partnership with Paul Lambert (Mathew Bose), the first of any primetime soap opera.

== Character creation and development ==
It was announced on 29 March 2008 that Jonny was being written out of the programme, and it was reported that Grieve had been axed by series producer Anita Turner, in addition to the axing of characters Grayson Sinclair (Christopher Villiers) and Perdita Hyde-Sinclair (Georgia Slowe). Before this there was already reports of low morale, and the axing apparently caused friction on set. At the time Grieve said that while he had "thoroughly enjoyed the role" he thought "the time is right to move on."

In December 2008, it was announced that Jonny would be returning to Emmerdale to play a part in the departure of Paul. The actor said that he "couldn't resist this opportunity" to return to the programme.

== Storylines ==
Jonny first appears in February 2007 when he strikes up a friendly working relationship with Grayson Sinclair. Grayson's wife, Perdita Hyde-Sinclair, is worried that they are having an affair and invites Johnny to a dinner party with her friend, Paul Lambert. They get on and soon start dating. After six months together, Jonny moves into Victoria Cottage with Paul, Paul's father, Rodney Blackstock (Patrick Mower), and Emily Kirk (Kate McGregor). He confides in Paul that, as a teenager, he suffered from an eating disorder as a result of loneliness and unhappiness. During his time in Emmerdale, Jonny sets up an aerobics dance class and fitness club.

When Rosemary King (Linda Thorson) causes problems in Grayson and Perdy's marriage, leading to Perdy being sectioned, Paul spends more time with Grayson. He acts as go-between as Perdy refuses to see Grayson and this leads to Paul developing feelings for Grayson and Jonny asks Paul to marry him. Paul accepts but has a one-night stand with Grayson. When Grayson tells Paul it meant nothing to him, Paul feels guilty and tells Jonny but persuades Jonny that it was a one-off and on 3 March 2008, they get married at Hotten Registry Office. Later that day, they have a 2nd ceremony at Home Farm as neither can tell their parents they have already married.

In July, Katie Sugden (Sammy Winward) gives birth to Grayson and Perdy's son – she agreed to be their surrogate when they were still together. Katie and Grayson agreed to raise the child together and allow Perdy access but Katie changes her mind when she finds out about Grayson and Paul's one-night stand. Katie did not tell Perdy of her plans to give her the baby, so after delivering the baby in the back of Matthew King's (Matt Healy) car, she phones Grayson with the news but is convinced by Katie and Matthew to leave with the baby. Jonny, however, refuses to believe that Paul did not warn Grayson but is coming round until he sees Paul and Grayson hug. Although, Paul said nothing had happened and he had not reciprocated the hug, Jonny told Paul that he could no longer trust him and leaves at the end of the month. He later texts asking for a divorce.

In January 2009, Jonny requests they close their joint bank account. Paul's friends, Lily Butterfield (Anne Charleston) and Leyla Harding (Roxy Shahidi), seeing how upset he is, decide to try to reconcile him and Jonny. This causes Jonny's mother, Patricia, to visit. After initial confusion, Paul convinces Patricia that he still loves Jonny, who has moved to Australia. He plans to travel to Australia to try to rebuild his relationship with Jonny, but his mother Val Pollard (Charlie Hardwick) lies and tells him that Rodney has a heart condition, hoping to stop him leaving while Lily gets in touch with Jonny and arranges a meeting between him and Paul. While they both love each other, Paul tells Jonny he cannot leave Emmerdale because of his father's condition. However, on the day Jonny is due to fly out, Paul finds out his mother was lying and leaves for Australia.

== Reception ==
On 3 March 2008, Paul and Jonny made British television history by becoming the first couple on a primetime soap opera to enter a civil partnership since the Civil Partnership Act 2004 came into force on 5 December 2005. Although radio soap The Archers and daytime soap Doctors had previously featured civil partnerships, Emmerdale was the first primetime soap opera to do so. Matthew Bose, who plays Paul, said he was "proud" Emmerdale was the first, and commented that soaps "have a great responsibility to show things as they change and be cutting edge".
