= Perdita Hyde-Sinclair =

Fictional character from Emmerdale

- Emmerdale character
- Portrayed by: Georgia Slowe
- Duration: 2006–2008
- First appearance: 3 March 2006
- Last appearance: 22 July 2008
- Introduced by: Kathleen Beedles
In-universe information
- Other names: Perdy Hyde-Sinclair
- Occupation: Stable co-owner
- Brothers: Harry Hyde
- Husband: Grayson Sinclair (until 2008)

Perdita Hyde-Sinclair is a fictional character from the British soap opera Emmerdale, played by Georgia Slowe. Slowe joined the main cast alongside Christopher Villiers as Perdy's husband Grayson Sinclair. She made her first appearance in the lead up to the wedding between Sadie King (Patsy Kensit) and Grayson's brother Alasdair Sinclair (Ray Coulthard), which was broadcast on 1 March 2006. Perdy received immediate comparisons to Sadie, and an Inside Soap columnist pointed out that just like her, Perdy also "loves money, men and getting her way." Slowe bemoaned her and Villiers' slow introduction to the show, saying they had nothing to do for the first six months as producers let viewers get used to their characters.

Perdy is characterised as the stuck-up, stoic, obeying wife of Grayson. She has a "gutsy get-up-and-go attitude", as well as "a taste for the finer things". On the surface, it appears Perdy and Grayson are a perfect match, but Grayson is secretly bisexual and his many affairs have hurt Perdy and strained their marriage. Shortly after her introduction, Perdy has a flirtation with veterinarian Hari Prasad (John Nayagam) and a one-night stand with Matthew King (Matt Healy). It also emerges that Perdy has had difficulty in conceiving a child and she suffers a series of miscarriages, before undergoing a hysterectomy. Perdy has a difficult relationship with her mother-in-law Rosemary Sinclair (Linda Thorson), who blames Perdy for not giving her grandchildren.

Further storylines for the character include Rosemary's attempts to make Perdy appear insane, an affair with Matthew, and the break down of her marriage. Perdy and Grayson also accept Katie Sugden's (Sammy Winward) offer to become their surrogate, but Katie and Grayson soon begin a relationship, which leaves Perdy worried about her involvement in her child's life. Perdy also blackmails Grayson over his plot to frame Matthew for Rosemary's murder. In May 2008, it was announced that Slowe was leaving the show at the conclusion of the surrogacy storyline. Her character was written out as part of a cast clear-out by the show's new series producer. Perdy's exit scenes aired on 22 July 2008, as she is persuaded by Katie to take the baby and start a new life.

== Casting ==
In March 2006, Inside Soap announced Slowe and Christopher Villiers had joined the cast of Emmerdale on a regular basis, playing Perdita and Grayson Sinclair. The characters move into Oakwell Hall, after previously appearing in the run up to Sadie King (Patsy Kensit) and Alasdair Sinclair's (Ray Coulthard) wedding. Perdy was immediately compared to Sadie, with an Inside Soap writer calling her "a new rich bitch in the village" and noting she could "be every bit as evil as the scheming Ms King!" An Emmerdale spokesperson also noted Perdy and Sadie's similarity, stating "Like Sadie, Perdy loves money, men and getting her way. She'll turn heads straight away, but whether she'll risk her marriage and status for a fling remains to be seen."

In December 2007, Slowe told Graham Young of the Birmingham Mail that her introduction to Emmerdale had been quiet and for the first six months she and Villiers had nothing to do. Slowe explained "We literally limped in and occasionally ambled into The Woolpack and bought an orange juice, so we were pulling our hair out. When they introduce new families, they have to do it very carefully, let people get used to you." The actress added the process of being introduced so gently was frustrating and only after the first six months did her character begin to evolve. Slowe chose not to relocate to Yorkshire, where Emmerdale is filmed and instead spent the week filming her scenes, before returning home to north London at the weekend.

== Development ==
=== Introduction ===
"Perdy comes across as the obeying wife of Grayson who only ever wanted to marry into money and have an easy life. But it transpires that Perdy’s life is not as rosy as it seems and her gutsy get-up-and-go attitude can only be admired."

— Perdy's character outline published on ITV's official Emmerdale website (August 2007).

Perdy was billed as having "a taste for the finer things, and will go all-out for what she wants." The character's profile at itv.com described her as "stuck-up", having an "outward stoic appearance" and "nursing a secret heartache". They stated that while it appears Perdy and Grayson are "a perfect match", Grayson is secretly bisexual and his "wandering eye has caused her much pain". An Inside Soap writer said that it would soon become clear that Perdy's marriage to Grayson was "on the edge", and hinted at a future affair storyline for the character, saying that she "gets intimate" with one of the show's established male characters. The storyline began shortly after the character's arrival in the village, as she begins a flirtation with veterinarian Hari Prasad (John Nayagam). Hari becomes smitten with Perdy, and later abandons a game of golf with Grayson to meet with her. However, Perdy just wants to talk, until there is a risk of them being caught together and she kisses him. Perdy was described as "manipulative" during the plot by an Inside Soap critic, who believed she had "ulterior motives obviously at work". It soon emerges that Perdy has had difficulty in conceiving a child throughout her marriage to Grayson. In scenes broadcast in late September 2006, Perdy is shown in the aftermath of a "devastating" miscarriage. She then reveals that this is the fifth time she has miscarried, which leaves Grayson "shaken to the core." Grayson's mother Rosemary Sinclair (Linda Thorson) blames Perdy for not giving her grandchildren, which leaves Grayson "so horrified" he makes plans to move himself and Perdy out of Oakwell Hall.

Jane Gillow of Inside Soap observed that Perdy has a difficult relationship with her "overbearing" mother-in-law, as they both want control of Grayson. Slowe told Gillow that her character is "the kind of person who craves independence". After Perdy and Grayson secure Mill Cottage for a low price, Slowe said moving to the village would allow them the chance to build a future together, while also getting out from under Rosemary's shadow. Slowe explained that Perdy is "anxious" about the payments on the cottage, as she is aware that Grayson tends to spend his money before he gets it. She said "while she usually has no tolerance for weakness, her devotion to him means she accepts that it'll be down to her to tidy up their finances." In an effort to cut down on their "high-class lifestyle", Perdy befriends Katie Sugden (Sammy Winward) and arranges for her horse to be stabled at Butler's Farm. But when the horse is injured on a barbed wire fence, Perdy uses the situation to her advantage. Slowe told Gillow that Perdy is angry about her horse, but she realises she has an opportunity to "bulldoze" her way into securing a share of the stables. Gillow pointed out that Perdy had received "a mixed bag of storylines" since her introduction and wondered if things would start to settle down. Slowe admitted that she was never sure in which direction the writers would take her character, but Perdy would begin playing "an active role" in village affairs, adding "Perdy really isn't the type of person to sit back and let things just happen..."

=== Fertility issues and Rosemary's manipulation ===
Perdy has a one-night stand with Matthew King (Matt Healy). She later suspects she is pregnant, but when Grayson becomes excited at the prospect of having a child, she is forced to reveal the truth about Matthew. A "horrified" Grayson then tries to hit Matthew with his car, before confronting him. It turns out that Perdy is not pregnant, but her marriage is strained more than before. Perdy's fertility problems continue when she suffers an ectopic pregnancy, which results in doctors having to perform a hysterectomy to in order to save her life. Slowe said that they had to take care to get things right with the hysterectomy story and not show Perdy getting over it in a week. Slowe was aware that there would be women watching the show who have gone through the same procedure and they did not want to sell short how difficult it is. She also said that they had a responsibility to tackle an issue like that properly. Inside Soap chose the storyline as one of their "best bits of April" in their annual Yearbook. A writer for the publication questioned whether Perdy and Grayson's marriage would survive yet another blow. In an interview with Helen Childs of Inside Soap, Slowe empathised with her character because she also wanted children "very much" and loved her two sons. She admitted she would have been bereft if the choice had been taken away from her. When asked if Perdy's marriage can survive, Slowe replied: "Perdy's been asking herself if she can make the marriage work without a child. Even she's wondering what the point of going on is."

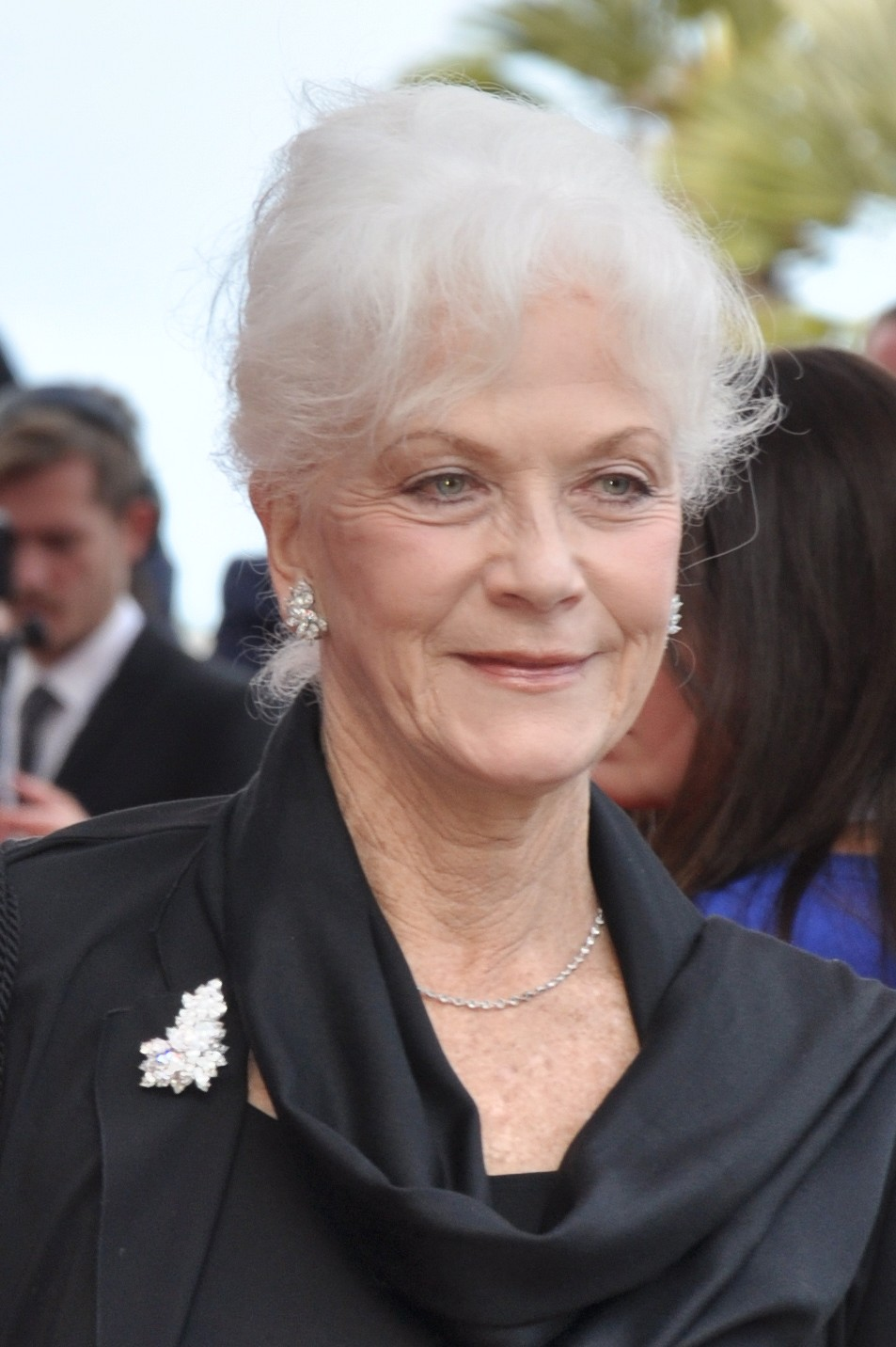
Perdy has a difficult relationship with her mother-in-law Rosemary Sinclair, played by Linda Thorson (pictured).

The development leads to one of the character's more notable storylines, as Rosemary begins manipulating Perdy in an attempt to drive her insane. A reporter for The Northern Echo likened the storyline to the plot of the 1944 film Gaslight. Slowe relished the chance to play out her character's "nightmare" and was excited to receive the new scripts each week, saying "My heart's in my mouth when I read through them, as I'm never sure what's coming next!" She explained that Rosemary has never actually liked Perdy, but she put up with her when there was a chance Perdy could provide her with a grandchild. Now that Perdy has had a hysterectomy, Rosemary believes there is no point to her and she plots to break up Perdy and Grayson, so he will find a woman who will have his children and be easier for Rosemary to control. Slowe believed it was "all too easy" for Rosemary to manipulate her character, saying "Perdy's completely depressed and very vulnerable. Normally, she can protect herself against Rosemary, but because of her current state, she's dropped her barriers." Perdy is prescribed antidepressants, but she is not told about the possible side-effects, which leave her feeling confused. Rosemary takes advantage of this to play "her head games" and Perdy is "all over the place."

As part of Rosemary's "catalogue of mischief", Perdy is blamed for misplacing some of Grayson's important paperwork and she experiences paranoia when Grayson finds damage to their car. Slowe told Childs that Perdy takes the car to a doctor's appointment, which was made for her by Rosemary, only to find that it is not for when she thought it was. Feeling confused, Perdy returns home where she takes her medication and has a glass of wine. When she is woken up by Grayson asking what happened to the car, which is scratched and dented, she has no idea how it got to be like that. Slowe continued: "Even though the poor woman's close to breaking point, still Rosemary doesn't let up. The next day, she locks Perdy out of the house and makes a show of the fact that the kitchen was on the point of burning down because Perdy left a pan on the stove! And there's more to come..." Rosemary later begins drugging Perdy, which led Villiers to call Rosemary "an absolute tyrant".

Villiers told Inside Soap's Allison Maund: "She's been setting Perdy up left, right and centre. From Grayson's point of view, his wife is delusional – which is why he's convinced that she needs proper psychiatric help. Rosemary hasn't caused Perdy's illness, but by constantly drugging her, she's made her condition far worse." When Grayson believes that Perdy has killed her missing kitten and buried the body in their garden, he calls a doctor who suggests that Perdy should be hospitalised, which plays into Rosemary's hands. Grayson is hesitant until a "vicious row" breaks out between the women. Villiers explained that Perdy finds the loft has been filled with children's toys and nursery furniture and blames Rosemary, whom she locks in the loft with her. Villiers continued: "Grayson arrives home during this huge argument, and even though Rosemary admits to Perdy that she's to blame for her downward spiral, no one else hears, and an ambulance is called." In dramatic scenes, Perdy is dragged from her house "kicking and screaming" and admitted to a psychiatric unit. She later accuses Grayson of being in on Rosemary's scheme. Villiers said the situation was a severe test for the couple and assured fans that Grayson would discover what his mother had done, describing the fallout as "biblical".

Matthew visits Perdy in the psychiatric unit and offers her his assistance. Healy explained that his character had an ulterior motive, saying "The fact that Matthew and Perdy once had a one-night stand doesn't cross his mind – he's helping her in order to annoy Rosemary. He is sympathetic towards Perdy, which is pretty unusual for Matthew, but basically he'll help anyone who opposes Rosemary." Matthew immediately suspects Rosemary' involvement in Perdy's hospitalisation. Healy said that Matthew does not trust Rosemary and he thinks the worst of her, especially as it is "too convenient" for Rosemary that Perdy has gone "a bit doolally" and has been locked up. He also said "Perdy tells Matthew her side of the story and he believes her. At the moment, he's the only one who does." Healy told Maund that Matthew's advise to Perdy is to fake acceptance of her illness and agree to take the medication to get better. This leads to Perdy realising that she is on her own and Matthew is the only person who appears to trust what she is saying. Healy said Matthew knows that this is the fastest way for her to get out of the hospital, adding "Matthew's goal is to get Perdy home. He knows that's the last thing Rosemary wants, and he'd love to put her nose out of joint." When asked whether the new bond forming between Matthew and Perdy would turn romantic, Healy replied that it could, as it was rare for his character to show emotion.

=== Surrogacy and blackmail ===
In late 2007, producers conceived a love triangle arc for Perdy, Grayson and Katie. The storyline begins with Rosemary's attempts to push Grayson and Katie together, which she hopes will end his "fragile" marriage to Perdy. Winward said her character had "definitely fallen" for Grayson because of how nice he was to her. Katie later offers to be a surrogate for Perdy and Grayson in order to get closer to him. A reporter from the Manchester Evening News wondered just how desperate Katie was and believed she was headed for a fall because she was unaware that Grayson was bisexual. Winward said that Katie thinks the situation will lead Grayson to reciprocate her feelings, but if she found out about his bisexuality, she would likely change her mind about carrying his and Perdy's baby. Perdy is "absolutely stunned" by Katie's offer, which is not the reaction Katie thought she would get. Winward explained: "Grayson thinks it's a good idea almost straightaway. Perdy is different and thinks Katie's being too generous. She doesn't understand why she would want to risk so much for them." Perdy is eventually persuaded that surrogacy is the best way for her and Grayson to finally have the family they always wanted.

After Perdy begins an affair with Matthew, a Manchester Evening News reporter opined that "Perdy's world is a very chaotic place." Slowe joked "Matthew probably thinks he's getting a nice, well-behaved upper middle class girl and she's not really that at all. She's quite a handful." Slowe reckoned there would be "huge fireworks" when the affair is exposed. The reporter also stated that Perdy would learn of Grayson's role in framing Matthew for Rosemary's death, which throws everything into "disarray." Slowe relished the storyline and the challenges it brought. Grayson and Perdy separate when he learns about her and Matthew. This prompts Katie to reveal her feelings for Grayson and he reciprocates when she kisses him. The trio later attend the first ultrasound scan, which makes them all realise how much of a mess they are all in. Winward commented "This is the point when they realise, 'Oh my God, we're really doing this!'. It's a very emotional moment, but they're all sitting there in amazement, wondering if they'll actually go through with this mad plan." Winward was excited for the storyline, and revealed that she was close friends with Slowe off-screen. She said Slowe's character was "really rude and horrible to Katie", and joked that it was "bonkers" that Perdy's behaviour had not put Katie off being a surrogate.

A "brawl" breaks out between Perdy and Katie after Katie manages to persuade her into burning Rosemary's cardigan, which Perdy has been using to blackmail Grayson over custody of the baby. Slowe told Maund (Inside Soap) "Grayson used a button from the cardigan as evidence to frame Matthew, which led to him being wrongly charged with Rosemary's murder." Katie manipulates Perdy by telling her that she is causing herself undue anxiety, but once Perdy puts the cardigan in the fire, Katie reveals that she and Grayson are in love and that they will be bringing up the baby together, leading Slowe to brand Katie as "vindictive". Katie flees as Perdy tries to salvage the cardigan, but Perdy soon catches up with her and "a furious catfight erupts" between the women, which results in Katie falling to the ground. Slowe admitted that her character "sees red" and that she does not intend to harm the baby, but she "goes wild with rage and ends up lashing out." Slowe said her character feels awful when Katie falls and tries to find out how the baby, but when Katie tells her that it is none of her business, Perdy realises she has no more bargaining power. Slowe told Maund that the only thing she can do is try and force Katie to leave Grayson, so she decides to reveal that he has had several affairs with men.

The relationship between Grayson and Perdy also "hits an-all time low" after she learns that he has had a one-night stand with her close friend Paul Lambert (Matthew Bose). Paul has to intervene when Perdy discovers Grayson and Katie attended an ultrasound scan together and learned that the baby is a boy. The "ugly confrontation" between the couple steadily escalates until Grayson taunts Perdy about spending the night with Paul. This sends Perdy into "a rage" and she lunges for him, resulting in her arrest. Perdy then leaves the village, but Slowe confirmed that she had not given up on her baby, she just needs space. When asked by a Soaplife writer whether that was from Grayson, Slowe replied "Hmmm, I think she may still be in love with him. Certainly when they meet and are alone together there's tenderness there. It's only ever been other people who cause trouble between them." Slowe reckoned the only way they would get back together is if the baby was part of the deal. She also said that Perdy thinks the relationship between Grayson and Katie was "totally ridiculous" and their bond was only temporary because of the baby.

When questioned about Perdy's reaction to a potential marriage between Grayson and Katie, Slowe said Perdy would think Grayson was stupid, but she would "feel threatened" because a marriage would strengthen their legal case for keeping the baby. Perdy consults with a lawyer to find out about her rights, and Slowe believed that she had a good case, saying "It's Perdy's egg not Katie's that was fertilised with Gray's sperm. Technically Katie's an incubator – that's all. This was the deal in the first place. Perdy is the baby's biological mother – end of story." Grayson learns about Perdy's talk with the lawyer and visits her in an attempt to mend things, as the lawyer, a friend of the family, tells him a court case would be long and expensive. Slowe told the writer that Perdy would be prepared to raise the baby on her own, but she was unsure whether Perdy would let Grayson have access. She said that Perdy would do anything to get her baby, adding "This baby is her life and she'll throw everything she's got into getting him... and keeping him!"

==== Departure ====
In May 2008, Katy Moon of Inside Soap confirmed that Slowe was leaving the show, along with Villiers, whose departure had already been announced, at the conclusion of the surrogacy storyline. Their characters were written out as part of a cast clear-out by the show's new series producer Anita Turner. Slowe stated that she was looking forward to filming her character's exit scenes and praised the show for giving her a "a fantastic break." Slowe later summed up her character's time in the show, stating: "There's never been a dull moment for Perdy. She's been in a psychiatric unit, in prison – and dragged out of the Woolpack innumerable times by different people!" Slowe said she had enjoyed every moment of working on Emmerdale and acting on a soap opera with a close cast and crew. She called it "an amazing learning curve" and said she would miss her friends and Yorkshire, where the serial is filmed. Ahead of Perdy and Gray's departures, Turner explained how the love triangle storyline would leave Katie in a strong position going forward, but she did not want to "underestimate viewers' investment in Grayson and Perdy either." She told Kris Green of Digital Spy that the plot would "do justice" to Perdy as she leaves, adding that there would be some unexpected twists and turns.

Perdy's exit scenes aired on 22 July 2008. In the lead up to her departure, Grayson discovers Katie's plot to cut him out of the baby's life, after she brings the date of the Caesarean forward. Winward stated that her character is "too fragile" to get away from Grayson, who physically and verbally threatens her, until Jonny Foster (Richard Grieve) comes to her rescue. Matthew also comes to her aid when she goes into premature labour. Winward told Inside Soap's Katy Moon: "Katie knows the baby is on its way, and she's desperate to find the biological mother, Perdy, who she plans to give the kid to." After locating Perdy, Katie gives birth to a baby boy, whom Perdy helps to deliver on the back seat of the car. Winward said Perdy is "thrilled" that she is there when the baby is born. She added that when Perdy "unwittingly" phones Grayson, it sends Katie into a panic, so she tells Perdy to take the baby and run, which she does. Perdy's final episode drew an overnight audience of 5.8 million and a 33% share. By comparison fellow soap opera EastEnders suffered one of its lowest-ever ratings.

== Storylines ==
Shortly after arriving in the village, Perdy flirts with vet Hari Prasad in order to make Grayson jealous, but she cannot bring herself to be unfaithful despite Grayson's own infidelities. However, she and Hari become good friends. Perdy's mother-in-law Rosemary feels Perdy is not good enough for Grayson and her displeasure with Perdy's miscarriages and apparent inability to carry a child full-term is evident. It soon becomes clear that Grayson has had a number of one-night stands with men. When Perdy suspects Grayson is cheating again, she has sex with Matthew King, Grayson's stepbrother. Matthew is eager to take their relationship further, but Perdy is still committed to Grayson, so she and Matthew also become good friends. After suspecting she is pregnant, Perdy tells Grayson about Matthew, as she is worried about the paternity of the child, but is relieved to find it is a false alarm. In order to make amends for his cheating, Grayson buys Mill Cottage and the couple move in. However, Rosemary begins causing trouble between them.

Perdy soon strikes up friendships with Paul Lambert and Katie Sugden. She discovers she is pregnant again, but when she begins bleeding Katie calls for an ambulance. When they reach the hospital, Perdy collapses and is diagnosed with an ectopic pregnancy and has to undergo an emergency hysterectomy. When Perdy awakes, Grayson tells her what has happened and she announces the end of their marriage, but Grayson refuses to leave. They discuss their marriage and agree to consider alternative options to have a family. After being discharged, Perdy suffers from insomnia and mood swings and is put on a course of antidepressants. Rosemary soon begins tampering with her medication in a bid to make Perdy seem insane. She gives away Perdy's new kitten and then digs a grave in the garden. She also fills the attic with baby furniture, which sparks an angry reaction from Perdy, who locks Rosemary in with her. Perdy is soon admitted to a psychiatric unit. Matthew visits and tells her to fake acceptance of her illness, before helping her get revenge on Rosemary. When Rosemary admits to what she has done, Grayson throws his mother out. Perdy stays with Matthew at Home Farm. After the truth is revealed to the village, Perdy leaves for London, but soon returns when Paul tracks her down and convinces her to return.

Perdy and Grayson accept Katie's offer to be their surrogate. Perdy plans to leave Grayson once the baby is born, but he overhears her conversation with Matthew and then schemes to frame him for Rosemary's murder. Perdy discovers Grayson's scheme and blackmails him into going to the police and Matthew is released from remand. Perdy then leaves Grayson for Matthew. Katie threatens to terminate the pregnancy, but Perdy blackmails Grayson again. However, Grayson and Katie become a couple themselves and destroy Perdy's evidence against Grayson. Soon after, Perdy and Matthew break up. Things come to a head when Grayson tells Perdy that he and Paul had a one-night stand and she attacks him and is arrested in the process. Grayson takes out a restraining order and Perdy leaves. She returns shortly before Katie gives birth. They reconcile after Katie discovers Grayson's bisexuality and infidelities. When Katie goes into labour in Matthew's car, Perdy helps delivers the baby and later at the hospital, she and Matthew make amends. Katie and Matthew convince Perdy to start a new life – just her and her son – and give her £20,000. After some persuasion, Perdy and her much longed-for baby son leave the hospital and Grayson misses them by seconds. Perdy later sends a photo of herself and the baby to Matthew, which he passes on to Grayson.

== Reception ==
An Inside Soap writer branded the character "the latest rich bitch about to set hearts aflutter in the Dales". While Graham Young of the Birmingham Mail branded Perdy "posh totty." A Manchester Evening News reporter said Slowe "certainly lends some sex appeal to The Woolpack, where her character has shaken things up." They also observed that "Perdy's world is a very chaotic place." Another Inside Soap columnist called Perdy a "wanton wife" for seducing Hari. A reporter for the Daily Record observed that the character "has never been the sharpest knife in the drawer", while another critic for the newspaper noted: "It seems she's not happy unless she's up to her neck in murder and intrigue." They added that she makes "a hash of things once again" when she revealed her blackmail of Gray to Katie. A fellow reporter called her a "long-suffering brunette".

Jane Simon of the Daily Mirror was critical of the character and her husband, writing "I'm trying to imagine what Gray and Perdy's child might be like – if it takes after its parents it'll be so wooden Katie will be able to use it as an occasional table." When Perdy returned home to stay with Gray and Katie, Simon commented that she would "rather stick pins in my eyes" than watch the scenes. A writer from All About Soap was not impressed with Rosemary scheming against Perdy. They included the plot in their stories "we hate" feature adding, "Rosemary out to get Perdy... what's that all about?" While reviewing Rosemary's attempts to drive Perdy insane, a critic for The Northern Echo commented "This is no bad thing, I may help her as Perdy is already driving me mad." However, they thought that Perdy showed she was "not as nutty as a bag of almonds" when she realises what Rosemary was up to, but thought that "locking herself and her tormentor in the attic hardly seems the action of a sane woman."
