= Paul Lambert (Emmerdale) =

Fictional character from Emmerdale

- Emmerdale character
- Portrayed by: Mathew Bose
- Duration: 2004–2010, 2015
- First appearance: 10 September 2004
- Last appearance: 2 September 2015
- Introduced by: Steve Frost (2004); Gavin Blyth (2010); Kate Oates (2015)
In-universe information
- Occupation: Event organiser Bar owner
- Father: Rodney Blackstock
- Mother: Val Pollard
- Stepfather: Eric Pollard
- Half-sisters: Bernice Blackstock; Nicola King; Sharon Lambert
- Civil partner: Jonny Foster (2008–2014)
- Aunts: Diane Sugden
- Nieces: Gabby Thomas; Dee Dee; Angelica King
- First cousins: Bernice Blackstock
- Other relatives: Thomas Tate

Paul Lambert is a fictional character from the British ITV soap opera Emmerdale, played by Mathew Bose. Paul appeared between 2004 and 2009. He arrives as the son of existing characters Val Lambert (Charlie Hardwick) and Rodney Blackstock (Patrick Mower), and in 2008, Paul, who is openly gay, enters into a civil partnership with Jonny Foster, the first of any primetime soap opera. The character departed in 2009, but made brief returns in 2010, and in March and September in 2015.

== Characterisation and development ==
When Paul arrives in the village, he is the only gay male in the programme. While Bose said he liked "being the only gay in Emmerdale", he did not want Paul to be defined by his sexuality. In a February 2008 interview, Bose said that he thought about leaving after a storyline where Paul has a one-night stand with a married man, Grayson Sinclair (Christopher Villiers), saying that he did not believe Paul would have done that. He also criticised the storyline, saying, "It makes out that all gay men are promiscuous and I don't think they are any more promiscuous than anyone else." The actor said that the audience "distrust why shows are doing things then start not to like the character's story and it is hard to win them back." After he "kicked up a fuss", he said the storyline "seems to have been dropped", but said that he would give it a few months before deciding whether to stay with the programme.

On 3 March 2008, Paul and Jonny made British television history by becoming the first couple on a primetime soap opera to enter a civil partnership since the Civil Partnership Act 2004 came into force on 5 December 2005. Although radio soap The Archers and daytime soap Doctors had previously featured civil partnerships, Emmerdale was the first primetime soap opera to do so. Bose said he was proud Emmerdale was the first, and commented that soaps "have a great responsibility to show things as they change and be cutting edge".

In September 2008, it was announced that Bose would be leaving Emmerdale. He said that he had "had a brilliant time" playing Paul, but felt it was time to "explore new projects". He said it was a "personal decision", played down press rumours about low morale amongst the cast, and denied they were unhappy with series producer Anita Turner. Turner said that it was "always disappointing to see great actors go" and that the door would be "open for him to come back at any time".

Bose made a reappearance as Paul in 2010 when Paul attended his half-sister, Nicola King (Nicola Wheeler)'s, wedding.

On 17 February 2015, it was announced that Bose was returning to the show for a brief stint, appearing that March. On 11 August 2015, it was announced that Bose would be returning again for the funeral of his mother, Val. Paul returned on 1 September, before departing again on 2 September.

In a 2022 interview, Bose reflected on playing the character, saying that he was "gay on television" when it "wasn't really cool". He added that he "was doing drag on Emmerdale when it wasn't really cool and I was doing gay-kissing… Daniel Brocklebank and I did a gay kiss and it was a bit too passionate, [we got] hundreds and hundreds of complaints."

== Storylines ==
Paul arrives in the village in September 2004, for his aunt, Diane Blackstock's (Elizabeth Estensen), wedding to Jack Sugden (Clive Hornby) after leaving Italy having split from his partner of nine years Enzo (Daniel D'Alessandro). He is reunited with his mother Val (Charlie Hardwick) who is living in the village and has not seen Paul for years and he gives her a hostile reception. Paul returns to Italy to try to fix his relationship with Enzo, who later visits the village, but their relationship comes to an end. Paul and Val had had a difficult relationship for some years after he had had an affair with one of Val's boyfriends. His childhood was difficult, often having to protect his mother and get her out of trouble. He later revealed to Diane that he had been subjected to frequent beatings by the man he thought was his father, along with his brothers. On the day of Jack and Diane's wedding, Val revealed that Paul's father was not Jimmy Pepper (Michael Gunn), a former boyfriend, as he had always been told but Rodney Blackstock (Patrick Mower), who at the time of Paul's conception was married to Val's sister and Paul's aunt, Diane. Rodney and Paul then try to build a relationship, with Rodney finding Paul's sexuality difficult to cope with. However, they do finally build a good relationship. Paul also becomes close friends with Emily Kirk (Kate McGregor). In his early days in the village, Paul does a drag act, called Thelma Louise, but later stops doing this. He works as a barman at "The Woolpack" pub and also as an event organiser.

In 2005, Paul starts a relationship with bisexual Ivan Jones (Daniel Brocklebank), a local binman. Having suffered homophobic abuse in the past, Ivan does not want their relationship known, something which is difficult for Paul. They get past everyone finding out about their relationship by accident in the pub, but Paul's half-sister Nicola Blackstock (Nicola Wheeler) develops a crush on Ivan. However, when Lesley Meredith (Sherrie Hewson) – the mother of Nicola's partner Simon (Dale Meeks) – sees Ivan and Nicola together she gets the wrong idea, and tells everyone that they are having an affair. Paul ends their relationship, and although Ivan tells him Nicola was lying, Paul refuses to give him another chance.

In late 2006, Paul rescues Grayson Sinclair (Christopher Villiers) from a homophobic assault in a park in Hotten, and Grayson reveals he is bisexual. Grayson's wife, Perdita (Georgia Slowe), assumes that Paul and Grayson are having an affair, but Paul reassures her they are just friends, and he builds a strong friendship with Perdita. In February 2007, Perdita believes that Grayson is sleeping with Jonny Foster (Richard Grieve), so she introduces him to Paul to keep him away from Grayson. They soon start a relationship, and after six months Jonny moves in with Paul, Emily and Rodney. When Grayson and Perdita have difficulties in their relationship – caused by his mother Rosemary (Linda Thorson) – she is sectioned. Paul helps build their relationship and acts a go between the two when she refuses to see Grayson. Paul develops feelings for Grayson, and Jonny asks Paul to marry him. Paul accepts, but during their engagement he has a one-night stand with Grayson. When Grayson tells Paul it meant nothing to him, Paul feels guilty and tells Jonny. He manages to persuade Jonny not to leave Emmerdale and on 3 March 2008 they have their civil partnership at Hotten Registry Office. Later that day they have a ceremony at Home Farm, as neither can tell their parents they have already legally married.

Grayson and Perdita separate, and after one argument he tells her about his one-night stand with Paul. Months later, Katie Sugden (Sammy Winward) gives birth to Grayson and Perdita's child, who she had agreed to surrogate when they were still together. Katie had told Grayson that they would bring up the child together, without Perdita, but changes her mind when she finds out about Grayson's relationship with Paul. Katie had not told Perdita of her plans to give the child to her, so when Katie goes into labour Perdita tells Grayson. Perdita soon runs off with the baby, but Jonny refuses to believe that Paul had not tipped Grayson off. He later does believe Paul, but he later sees Paul and Grayson hug. Although, Paul said nothing had happened and he had not reciprocated the hug, Jonny said he could no longer trust Paul and leaves the village. Grayson leaves the next day after Paul outs him and tells the village about their one-night stand.

Jonny soon texts asking for a divorce, and in January 2009, he requests they close their joint bank account. After this Paul's friends, Lily Butterfield (Anne Charleston) and Leyla Harding (Roxy Shahidi), seeing how upset he is decides to try to reconcile him and Jonny. This causes Jonny's mother, Patricia (Vicki Michelle), to visit the village. After initial confusion, Paul convinces Patricia that he still loves Jonny, who has moved home to Australia. He plans to travel to Australia to try to rebuild his relationship with Jonny, but Val lies and tells him that Rodney has a heart condition in an attempt to ensure Paul does not leave the village. Lily, however, gets in touch with Jonny and arranges a meeting between him and Paul. While they both still love each other, Paul tells Jonny he cannot leave Emmerdale because of his father's condition. However, on the day Jonny is to fly out, Paul discovers Val had been lying about Rodney's illness after confronting Rodney when he was about to make love to Pam Montclare (Catherine Rabett). Before he leaves, although he does not forgive Val for her lies, he does say he believes she is sorry for what she did. He then rushes to meet Jonny and they leave for Australia together.

Paul returns briefly in June 2010 for Nicola's wedding to Jimmy King (Nick Miles). He goes back to Australia after the ceremony.

Paul returns again in March 2015 after Val is hospitalised after collapsing, whilst suffering from HIV. Paul is shocked by his mother's condition and sits at her bedside whilst she is in a coma and begs her to recover. He is also introduced to Val's employee Finn Barton (Joe Gill). When a doctor tells Val's family to prepare for the worst, Paul is devastated. Val wakes from her coma and Paul is relieved that his mother is OK. Paul notices that Finn is attracted to one of the hospital nurses, Darren Thompson (Danny Horn). He then goes to the village and visits his half-sister and cousin Bernice Blackstock (Samantha Giles) at her Beauty Salon and she shows him round her premises. He also is introduced to Val's other employee Tracy Shankley (Amy Walsh) when she asks Val's husband Eric Pollard (Chris Chittell) for a place to stay. Paul also visits Marlon (Mark Charnock) and Laurel Dingle (Charlotte Bellamy). He helps Laurel prepare for a job interview with Bernice and tells her that he would like to stay for longer but has things to sort out back home. Paul goes for drinks in the pub with Jimmy, Paddy Kirk (Dominic Brunt) and Chas Dingle (Lucy Pargeter) and promises to keep in touch and asks for updates on Val's recovery. He also says goodbye to Bernice then leaves.

Following Val's death in a helicopter crash, Paul returns to the village in September for his mother's funeral. He is comforted by Rodney and Bernice. Paul is shocked when a grieving Eric steals the hearse and drives off with Val's coffin still inside. He remarks that his mother would have found it funny. Paul also offers Alicia Metcalfe (Natalie Anderson) the chance to be his business partner and co-own his bar in Portugal. He breaks down in tears during the funeral service. After the funeral, Paul calls his sister Sharon (Victoria Hawkins), who had been unable to attend as she was looking after her young daughter, and tells her how the service went. The following day, before he leaves, Paul leads an intervention to the B&B of Eric's family and friends in an attempt to help him come to terms with his grief, but he lashes out at them and accuses Paul of abandoning Val. Paul then says his goodbyes and leaves, returning home to Portugal.

== Reception ==
Abbie Bray from the Daily Express called the character "iconic". Bose revealed that Paul and Ivan's kiss got "hundreds and hundreds of complaints" for being "too passionate". In 2022, Lucy Marshall from LeedsLive noted how fans wanted Bose to return to Emmerdale as Paul following Bose taking a picture with Nicola Wheeler, who portrays his sister.
