= Grayson Sinclair =

Fictional character from Emmerdale

- Emmerdale character
- Portrayed by: Christopher Villiers
- Duration: 2006–2008
- First appearance: 3 March 2006
- Last appearance: 2 September 2008
- Created by: Kathleen Beedles
In-universe information
- Occupation: Solicitor
- Father: Raymond Sinclair
- Mother: Rosemary King
- Stepfather: Tom King (2006)
- Brothers: Alasdair Sinclair
- Wife: Perdita Hyde-Sinclair (until 2008)
- Sons: Baby Hyde-Sinclair
- First cousins: Lord Alex Oakwell

Grayson Sinclair is a fictional character from the British ITV soap opera Emmerdale, played by Christopher Villiers.

== Casting ==
In March 2006, a reporter for Inside Soap confirmed Villiers and Georgia Slowe had joined the cast of Emmerdale on a regular basis as Grayson and Perdita Hyde-Sinclair. They had previously made a brief appearance in the run up to Grayson's brother Alasdair Sinclair's (Ray Coulthard) wedding to Sadie King (Patsy Kensit). The couple were introduced as the new residents of Oakwell Hall and were billed as having "a marriage on the edge!" The Inside Soap writer added that Grayson "could be in for heartbreak" as his wife gets close to one of the show's bachelors. In December 2007, Slowe told Graham Young of the Birmingham Mail that the couple's introduction to Emmerdale had been quiet, and she felt that she and Villiers had nothing to do for the first six months.

In February 2008, it was announced that Grayson would be one of many characters to be written out as a result of falling ratings for the serial. Slowe and Richard Grieve, who played Jonny Foster were among those already axed. Further confirmation of Villiers' and Grieve's exits came the following month. Villiers explained "Grayson has been great to play. We've agreed the current storyline will provide an exciting exit – but this might not be the last we see of Gray."

== Storylines ==
Grayson is the eldest son of Rosemary Sinclair (Linda Thorson) and is Perdita Hyde-Sinclair's husband. He is first seen at a family dinner party at Oakwell Hall with Perdita to celebrate his brother Alasdair Sinclair's wedding to Sadie King. Grayson and Perdy attend the wedding which goes ahead but Sadie leaves Alasdair for her former brother-in-law, Matthew King (Matt Healy). Grayson is present when Rosemary cons Sadie into buying a family business which is worthless and makes her think she has served her horse up as a meal, as revenge for jilting Alasdair.

It becomes evident Grayson and Perdy's marriage is less than perfect with Grayson's frequent infidelities' and gambling problem. He sells some of Rosemary's paintings to Rodney Blackstock (Patrick Mower) and makes friends with Diane Sugden (Elizabeth Estensen) and she accompanied him to casinos until Perdy asks her to stop. Grayson was shocked to learn that Perdy has had five miscarriages. Grayson advises Bob Hope (Tony Audenshaw) and the villagers about how they could sue King and Sons for the show home collapse but changes sides, defending the Kings when they are charged with corporate manslaughter. Grayson and Perdy buy Mill Cottage.

Grayson learns Perdy had a fling with Matthew after she tells him she may be pregnant and the baby could potentially be Matthew's. Perdy is not pregnant but the damage is done. Grayson and Matthew continually butt heads as Matthew feels Grayson is not treating Perdita right and Grayson resents Matthew for trying to steal his wife. Matthew continues to taunt Grayson by calling him "Larry", a reference to comedian Larry Grayson, which Grayson hates, culminating in a fight. Matthew continues

Paul Lambert (Mathew Bose) rescues Grayson from a homophobic attack in a public park in Hotten. Paul asks Grayson what happened and Grayson told him that he is bisexual. Grayson and Paul became good friends because of this and also makes friends with Katie Sugden (Sammy Winward) after Perdita became Katie's business partner. Grayson advised her about her separation from husband Andy Sugden (Kelvin Fletcher). Grayson and Katie become closer after Perdita is sectioned and Rosemary encourages this as she actively dislikes Perdita and wants Grayson to move on and have a family. When it is revealed Rosemary is drugging Perdy, Grayson is enraged and throws his mother out and begs Perdita to give their marriage another chance. She agrees, much to Matthew's disappointment, and began contacting surrogacy agencies to discover if they could have a family. When Rosemary disappears and her handbag and passport are found in a bush by Paddy Kirk, all signs point to Rosemary being murdered and the evidence points at Matthew, who resented her. Matthew is bailed but quickly remanded in custody when Grayson frames him after seeing him and Perdy together. Perdy discovers this and blackmails Grayson, forcing him to reveal to the police that Rosemary had faked her death to frame Matthew. Matthew is released and Perdy leaves Grayson for him.

Grayson and Katie become an item, which complicates matters as she is Grayson and Perdy's surrogate and decides she wants to keep the baby and raise it with Grayson. Perdy attacks Katie, almost causing a miscarriage. Grayson tells Matthew who promptly throws Perdy out. Following Katie's discharge from hospital, Perdita tells her about Grayson's bisexuality, which Katie refuses to believe but Grayson admits it, to the shock of Katie but Katie accepts. Following a scan, Grayson and Katie tell Diane that the baby will be a boy and Perdita loses control and has to be restrained by Paul and Jonny. When Grayson admits that he and Paul had sex, Perdy attacks him and is arrested as a result. Grayson takes out a restraining order against his wife, who leaves.

When Katie tries to flee after worrying that neither Grayson nor Perdy will be able to provide the baby with a stable upbringing. Grayson is incensed and demands custody of the baby. Katie, is able to get away thanks to Johnny but goes into labour in the car. Matthew and Perdy assist Katie in getting the baby away from Grayson and Perdy leaves with the baby and £20,000 Grayson had given Katie to help her mother. When Grayson gets to the hospital, he tells the staff to report his son being kidnapped but after Katie tells them she was just to surrogate and Perdy is the mother, they call Perdy to confirm and she asks them not tell Grayson where they are. Grayson falls into despair and drinks heavily. Grayson goes out cruising, but is arrested and charged with indecent behaviour and released. A desperate, drunken Grayson locks himself and Victoria and demands the whereabouts of his wife and child. Katie escapes and is spotted by Paul and Diane. Grayson thinks they are on his side but is proven wrong when Paul punches him for causing problems in his relationship with Jonny. A number of villagers witness this and Grayson is ostracized and makes a warning he will be back.

Grayson returns in September taking Katie hostage again and this time, arch-enemy Matthew, too. He once again demands to know where Perdy is but they refuse. Grayson threatens to shoot Matthew but Katie still will not give him any information. Matthew's brothers Jimmy (Nick Miles) and Carl King (Tom Lister) arrive later and he takes them hostage too. They try to calm him down but Grayson sneers at Carl for being a part-time father. Furious, Carl walks towards Grayson, calling his bluff and is shot in the process. Carl is relatively unhurt, Jimmy and Matthew tackle Grayson while Katie grabs the gun and is prepared to shoot Grayson but Matthew tells her not to. Katie then calls for an ambulance and Grayson attempts to flee but is arrested in the process. Before he is taken away, Matthew gives Grayson a photo of Perdy had sent of her and the baby.
