= Rosemary King =

Fictional character from Emmerdale

- Emmerdale character
- Portrayed by: Linda Thorson
- Duration: 2006–2007
- First appearance: 23 March 2006
- Last appearance: 13 September 2007
- Introduced by: Kathleen Beedles
In-universe information
- Other names: Rosemary Sinclair
- Occupation: Businesswoman
- Husband: Raymond Sinclair (backstory); Tom King (2006)
- Sons: Grayson Sinclair; Alasdair Sinclair
- Stepsons: Jimmy King (2006); Matthew King (2006); Carl King (2006)

Rosemary King (also Sinclair) is a fictional character from the British television soap opera Emmerdale, played by Linda Thorson. She made her first appearance during the episode broadcast on 23 March 2006. She departed on 13 September 2007; the character was later killed off-screen on Christmas Day 2007.

== Casting ==
The character was introduced for the March 2006 wedding of Sadie King (Patsy Kensit) and Alasdair Sinclair (Ray Coulthard). The following month, Kris Green of Digital Spy confirmed Thorsen had joined the main cast and Rosemary would return in August, along with her son and daughter-in-law, to continue her feud with Sadie. Of her return, Thorson stated "I'm delighted to be returning as Rosemary on a more regular basis. She's a great character to play and I'm looking forward to seeing what the writers have got in store for her." Series producer Kathleen Beedles said Rosemary had been "a hugely popular character" with the audience during her brief appearance. Kate Woodward of Inside Soap believed Rosemary would take over from Sadie as "Emmerdale's superbitch" and said her family would not make a great impression on the villagers. Beedles told Woodward: "Rosemary thinks she's a cut above everyone. She's set to rock the village."

In August 2007, it was announced that Thorson would be leaving Emmerdale in the autumn and her final storyline would come to "a dramatic end", climaxing in Rosemary's exit.

== Storylines ==
Rosemary arrives in Emmerdale for her younger son, Alasdair's wedding to Sadie King (Patsy Kensit) and immediately disapproves of Sadie. On the morning of the wedding, Rosemary tries to bribe Sadie not to marry her son; however, Sadie refuses – threatening to get Alasdair to have put her in a retirement home if she does not back off. The wedding goes ahead but within minutes Sadie leaves the church with her ex-lover, Matthew (Matt Healy). Rosemary wants the marriage annulled to avoid paying Sadie a settlement but Sadie tricks her into thinking the marriage has been consummated, so an agreement is drawn up so that Rosemary will give Sadie the family's most valuable business in order to get the annulment. The papers are signed over dinner at Oakwell Hall and once Sadie's signature is finalised; Rosemary smugly reveals that the business is worthless and the meat she had served is from Sadie's horse, Cossack, much to her disgust. However, it is revealed to be a lie after Sadie leaves.

Rosemary returns in August where she is living with her other son, Grayson and his wife Perdita (Georgia Slowe). They quickly settle themselves into Emmerdale, where Rosemary becomes friends with local businessman, Rodney Blackstock (Patrick Mower). She soon acquainted herself with Tom King (Ken Farrington), Sadie's ex-father-in-law and the pair quickly bond over their mutual distrust of Sadie. Rosemary quickly realises that getting involved with Tom will be advantageous to both of them and began putting business his way. Tom and Rosemary's relationship soon becomes more than just business and a spark develops between them and they became lovers, much to Matthew's anger as he distrusts her. Tom's other sons Carl (Tom Lister) and Jimmy (Nick Miles), are equally concerned over Rosemary's motives.

It become apparent Rosemary's financial situation is dire due to constantly funding Grayson's appetites. She finally cuts him off, prompting more tension in an already fraught relationship between her and Perdita. Carl's girlfriend, Chas Dingle (Lucy Pargeter), can see that Tom and Rosemary were happy together and once Rosemary's motives were exposed, she convinced Carl and his brothers to leave her alone. Chas' sympathy quickly evaporates when Rosemary and Tom begin interfering in her and Carl's relationship and is further alienated when Rosemary agrees with Tom's opinion of Chas not being good enough for Carl. Rosemary moves into Home Farm and continues to bump heads with Chas and Tom's secretary, Edna Birch (Shirley Stelfox). Tom proposes and Rosemary accepts and they are married on Christmas Day by Bishop George Postlethwaite in the village church and a lavish reception is held at Home Farm. Tom gives Rosemary the estate as a wedding present, much to the disgust of his sons and she was delighted. Rosemary's jubilation soon turns to disappointment when Tom tells her that he wants her to leave it to Carl in her will as opposed to Grayson. Tom is killed later that evening after being bludgeoned then thrown through a window, to the horror of their guests.

Following Tom's death, there are numerous suspects for his murder including Rosemary, Grayson and the King brothers. Jimmy and Matthew are suspicious and want her out of Home Farm. Things are not helped when Tom's close friend, Charles Vaughan (Richard Cole) visits frequently and is a little too keen to comfort Rosemary. Matthew reports Charles' constant visits to Grace Barraclough (Glynis Barber), the DCI in charge of the investigation, giving her no choice but to pass it on to her bosses. When Rosemary returns after a period of leave, she finds the brothers have planned Tom's funeral without her input and takes Tom’s body. She is ignored at the funeral by them and they are angered to learn that Home Farm is bequeathed to them under the condition they give Rosemary a home for as long as she wants. Further shocks are in store when it is revealed that Tom has an illegitimate teenage daughter; Scarlett Nicholls (Kelsey-Beth Crossley). Rosemary then aligns with Scarlett's mother Carrie (Linda Lusardi). Rosemary is later questioned about the death of her previous husband, Ray, the father of Grayson and Alasdair 25 years earlier in 1982. Rosemary discloses to Zak Dingle (Steve Halliwell) that Ray had shot himself because she "made his life hell".

Rosemary schemes by playing mind games with tenant Andy Sugden (Kelvin Fletcher) to evict his ex-wife, Katie (Sammy Winward), and Perdita from Butler's Farm. She called him in, telling him under his tenancy agreement, he could not sublet any part of Butler's Farm if he wanted to continue renting it. Andy tells Katie and Perdita that they would have to find new premises and Rosemary told them they could use the stables at Home Farm in exchange for a 10% stake in the business. Perdita is furious at Rosemary muscling in but Katie was thrilled, seeing it as a chance to move up in the world.

Rosemary later became good friends with Zak, and grew close to his daughter Belle (Eden Taylor-Draper) – particularly when Rosemary agrees to pay the fees for her to go to private school. Zak worked as a gamekeeper at Home Farm, further building up their friendship. However, Zak's wife and Belle's mother Lisa (Jane Cox) suspects they were having an affair, which is not helped by Shadrach, Zak's brother, making comments about Rosemary. Lisa slaps Rosemary and throws Zak out, but Rosemary talks her round. Shortly afterwards, Grayson borrows money from Rosemary to place a bet on the horse that belonged to local veterinarian Hari Prasad (John Nayagam), but it loses and Grayson tells Hari to get the money back. Rosemary becomes involved, telling Hari not to worry about the money he owed her. She also gives him the money he needed to repay the money he had embezzled from the vet's surgery accounts to buy the horse if he told the police he overheard the Kings talking about the murder weapon. Hari agrees and pressure his fiancée Louise Appleton (Emily Symons) to back him up. Matthew works out Rosemary is behind Hari and Louise's statements and does not think much of them. Later, Hari finds himself in trouble when Louise finds out was he lying and goes to the police. He runs her car off the road, trying to stop her. On the day of the trial, Hari and Louise fail to show as Louise tells the police that she and Hari had heard the King brothers discussing Tom's murder and reports Hari's vehicular assault, resulting in his arrest and the King brothers being released, who were waiting for Rosemary. She tells Carrie she had lied and Carrie recorded it, later playing it to the Kings, who confront Rosemary. She tries to call for help but Matthew grabs the phone, holding it over a balcony. Rosemary tries to grab it but loses her balance, falling over the balcony and landing on the floor below. Rosemary is unhurt apart from a sore ankle and fears for her life. Matthew agrees to call an ambulance only if Rosemary will sign over Home Farm to the Kings. Rosemary, with her back against the wall, complies.

Rosemary then begins a gaslighting campaign against Perdita by meddling with her pills, prompting her to question her sanity. Perdita is eventually hospitalised and sectioned. Grayson visits the family doctor who tells him about the pills and he quickly learns the Rosemary has been drugging his wife. Incensed, Grayson throws her out and tells her not to return. The following day, Perdita reveals to everyone in the Woolpack that Rosemary has been drugging her. Zak comforts Rosemary at first and is horrified when she confirms Perdita's accusations and tells her to stay away from his family and leaves. Grayson then tells her to leave, which she refuses at first but then she disappears without a trace. When Edna searches for her dog, Tootsie, she finds her but does not notice Rosemary's handbag and passport. A few weeks later, Paddy Kirk and Marlon Dingle (Mark Charnock) were walking down a country road when they spotted Rosemary's handbag and passport lying in the grass. They alert the police, who search the bag and found a diary, and on 13th September (the date she was last seen), it reads "MK MF" in her handwriting. The police suspect this meant Matthew King, Manor Farm, meaning Rosemary had met Matthew at Manor Farm (the Kings' property) that day. Grayson is informed and Rosemary's car is found at Manor Farm, along with two cups of coffee with Rosemary and Matthew's respective prints. Matthew is then arrested and remanded in custody. Grayson hires a private detective, who tells him Rosemary is alive and living Miami and presents him with a letter telling Grayson how she faked her own death and framed Matthew. Grayson arrives at Home Farm to tell Matthew but sees him with Perdita and decides to hang onto the letter, and Matthew is imprisoned.

On Christmas Day 2007, Perdita find the letter and confronts Grayson. She tells him she is going to the police, but she and Grayson fight – during which he grabs the letter and flees but Carl and Jimmy tackle him and Perdita takes the letter to the police and Grayson claims he had been so busy that he did not realised what it was. The police pay this no more mind. Several days later, it is revealed that Rosemary had shot herself to death in Miami after learning the police were looking for her. Her body is brought back to Emmerdale to be buried next to Tom on New Year's Day 2008. An incensed Matthew waits until after the funeral and has Rosemary's coffin secretly dug up and placed in the back of a bin lorry to be crushed.

== Reception ==
For her portrayal of Rosemary, Thorson received a nomination for Best Soap Actress at the 2007 TV Quick and TV Choice Awards. She was also nominated for Best Actress and Best Bitch at the Inside Soap Awards. She received a nomination for Villain of the Year at The British Soap Awards, and was part of the Best Storyline nomination for "Who killed Tom King?", along with Farrington, Miles, Healey, and Lister.

Lucy Thornton of the Daily Mirror described Rosemary as a "superbitch". While discussing "queens of mean" in British soap operas, The Guardian's Gareth McLean wrote that Rosemary was part of the "complete bitch" trope, which also included Sadie. McLean then dubbed the character "icily calculating". As Grayson discovered that Rosemary was turning Perdy mad, Maeve Quigley quipped "I don't know why Grayson is surprised to finally twig that his mum is a demented wonk." Quigley felt a "grudging respect for her tireless campaign" to drive Perdy insane and said Rosemary sounded like Bryan Adams, as she claimed that "everything I do – I do it for you". Quigley added "Still there's no getting rid of the old bat. But what's this – a hot air balloon?"

== See also ==
- List of soap opera villains
