= Soapstar Superchef =

- Presented by: Richard Arnold; Nicki Chapman
- Country of origin: United Kingdom

Production
- Running time: 60 minutes
- Production company: ITV Productions

Original release
- Network: ITV
- Release: 19 March – 13 April 2007

Related
- Soapstar Superstar

Soapstar Superchef is a cooking show on the ITV Network, where soap stars from Coronation Street, EastEnders, Emmerdale, Hollyoaks (and Hollyoaks: In the City) and Neighbours competed to be crowned "kings" or "queens" of the kitchen.

Their culinary efforts were judged by an expert panel of three judges. Each judge gave a mark out of ten, and the teams were able to gain extra points by answering questions about a short clip from their rivals' soap.

Each team cooked twice and their points from both episodes were added together, then the two teams with the highest totals competed head-to-head to win the show.

The show was hosted by Richard Arnold, known as GMTV's television critic, and Nicki Chapman, an English television presenter who also worked in the British pop music industry.

Mathew Bose and Hayley Tamaddon were crowned Soapstar Superchefs on Friday 13 April 2007.

== Scores ==
Position	Points	Team	Soap
1	57	Mathew Bose, Hayley Tamaddon	Emmerdale
2	56	Sherrie Hewson, Julia Mallam	Emmerdale
3=	55	John Altman, Carol Harrison	EastEnders
3=	55	Malcolm Hebden, Jennie McAlpine	Coronation Street
5=	54	Sara Roache, William Roache	Coronation Street
5=	54	Leon Lopez, Philip Olivier	Hollyoaks: In the City
7	53	Carly Hillman, Pooja Shah	EastEnders
8	52	Guy Burnet, Marcus Patric	Hollyoaks
9=	50	James McKenna, Carley Stenson	Hollyoaks
9=	50	Dominic Brunt, Mark Charnock	Emmerdale
11=	49	Martin Hancock, Sean Wilson	Coronation Street
11=	49	Jayne Bickerton, Wendi Peters	Coronation Street
13	46	Richard Grieve, John Middleton	Emmerdale
14=	45	Meg Johnson, Peter Martin	Emmerdale
14=	45	Georgia Slowe, Christopher Villiers	Emmerdale
14=	45	Darren Jeffries, Matt Littler	Hollyoaks
14=	45	Anne Charleston, Blair McDonough	Neighbours
18	42	John Pickard, Nick Pickard	Hollyoaks
19	37	Andy Devine, James Hooton	Emmerdale

== Judges/Chefs ==
- Gino D'Acampo
- Keith Floyd
- Jilly Goolden
- Ken Hom
- Jonathan Meades
- Jean-Christophe Novelli
- Merrilees Parker
- Paul Rankin
- Jay Rayner
- Rosemary Shrager
- Brian Turner
- Antony Worrall Thompson
