= Anyword =

Artificial intelligence company

- Industry: AI language processing
- Founded: 2013
- Headquarters: New York City
- Key people: Yaniv Makeover, Co-founder, CEO; Adam Habari, Co-founder, VP R&D
- Website: anyword.com

Anyword is a technology company that offers an artificial intelligence platform, using natural language processing to generate and optimize marketing text for websites, social media, email, and ads. The company also offers a complete managed service to publishers and brands to help them increase their revenue through social ads. It is used by National Geographic, Red Bull, The New York Times, BBC, Ted Baker, etc. The company has an office in New York, and Tel Aviv.

== History ==
It was founded in 2013 — its original name was Keywee Inc.

In March 2015, Anyword received $9.1 million in the Series A funding round led by a notable group of investors.

In July 2016, the company was selected as an official Facebook Marketing Partner.

In August 2019, Anyword was named Best Content Marketing Platform in the Digiday Technology Award winners.

In November 2021, it raised $21 million in its Series B funding round.
