= Sadie King =

Fictional character from Emmerdale

- Emmerdale character
- Portrayed by: Patsy Kensit
- Duration: 2004–2006, 2026–present
- First appearance: Episode 3735; 10 May 2004
- Introduced by: Keith Richardson (2004); Laura Shaw (2026)
In-universe information
- Other names: Sadie Sinclair
- Occupation: Businesswoman
- Husband: Jimmy King (1990–2005); Alasdair Sinclair (2006)

Sadie King (also Sinclair) is a fictional character from the British television soap opera Emmerdale, portrayed by Patsy Kensit. The character made her first appearance on 10 May 2004 and was introduced as the former wife of Jimmy King (Nick Miles), who arrived with his family in 2004. Kensit left the serial in 2006 to accept a role on Holby City and departed on 21 September 2006. In May 2026, it was announced that Kensit had reprised the role after 20 years, returning on 2 September that year.

Kensit won the Best Bitch accolade for her portrayal of Sadie at the 2005 and 2006 Inside Soap Awards.

== Casting ==
In February 2004 it was announced that Patsy Kensit had agreed to sign a contract to play a new character in Emmerdale who will appear from May onwards. A show spokeswoman said: "She is a seductive, powerful and manipulative woman who knows what she wants and makes sure she gets it. We hope her character will follow in the footsteps of the soap's last super bitch, Kim Tate (Claire King)." Kensit herself said: "I can't wait to get started on Emmerdale and I've become an avid viewer! I am a bit of a country girl at heart and it is so exciting to be joining, especially at a time when the show is so strong. The prospect of being watched by over 10 million viewers every night is intimidating but I can't wait to get stuck in." Series producer Steve Frost said, "We're very excited to have Patsy on board and looking forward to introducing such a great character to the show. Sadie will be the envy of women and the desire of men."

In December 2005, it was reported that Kensit had decided to leave the role of Sadie for an opportunity to star in the BBC medical drama Holby City as nurse Faye Morton.

=== Return ===
It was initially reported in April 2026 that Kensit was reportedly tipped for a return. On 14 May 2026, ITV announced that Kensit will reprise her role as Sadie King after twenty years away later in 2026. Speaking on her return, Kensit said: "I am really excited to return to Emmerdale". Adding, "I treasure the years I was here before. Sadie King is a character that I really loved playing." "The cast and crew are absolutely brilliant and I am so grateful for the chance to return to the show - it's absolutely amazing." Emmerdale Producer, Laura Shaw added: "We are absolutely thrilled to welcome Patsy Kensit back to the cast and crucially to see the iconic Sadie King storm back into the village." Adding that her comeback will be "explosive" and is "guaranteed to shock", further teasing: "Sadie's seductive demeanor, combined with her utterly ruthless nature, are set to deliver a spectacular and highly dramatic touch of class to the Yorkshire Dales." On 3 August 2026, ITV confirmed that Kensit has signed a six-month contract lasting until December 2026, it was also reported that the character will fake her own death upon her return.

== Storylines ==
Sadie King arrives in Emmerdale via helicopter to join her husband Jimmy (Nick Miles) and his younger brothers in helping their father Tom King (Kenneth Farrington), also her father-in-law, celebrate his 65th birthday. She thereupon meets Tom's fiance Charity Dingle (Emma Atkins) and takes an instant disliking towards her; Sadie and Charity quickly become sworn enemies when the former shoves Charity down the stairs, injuring her arm, and falsely accuses Jimmy of doing it.

Although Sadie and Jimmy have been married for 17 years, the pair have vastly ambitious yet different dreams for their future - with Jimmy wanting to start a family whereas Sadie only cares about money. Sadie soon begins to lose interest in Jimmy and begins taking contraceptive injections behind Jimmy's back. Their marriage begins to detetiorate when Jimmy finds out about it.

Knowing that Jimmy's rejection means that her position in the King family is under threat, Sadie hatches a plan to ensure that Tom never marries Charity after he accepts her marriage proposal. She first seduces Charity's cousin and former lover Cain Dingle (Jeff Hordley), who becomes romantically attracted to Sadie, in order to use their fallout as part of her plan against Charity. It is then Sadie employs a private detective to trail Charity, before arranging to have him take photos of Cain appearing to seduce and kiss Charity at the rendezvous point. Sadie then presents Tom with the incriminating photos on the day of the wedding, which ends in disorder when Tom accuses Charity of adultery and jilts her in front of everyone.

Having ruined Charity's wedding, Sadie celebrates her apparent victory over her nemesis. But Charity vows revenge and executes her plan by seducing Jimmy and getting him drunk. Charity then videotapes herself and Jimmy sleeping together, during which Jimmy reveals Sadie's actions and Cain's involvement. Later on at Jimmy's 40th birthday party, Charity arrives and reveals the truth to everyone. She presents the tape and convinces Tom to play it, which shows Jimmy revealing that Sadie ruined the wedding and the state of their marriage. Sadie is humiliated and disgraced by the family. She attempts to attack Charity in retaliation, but Charity punches Sadie to the floor and triumphantly leaves the village. Sadie is then disowned by Tom alongside Jimmy, who then demands a divorce from Sadie at the same time.

At this point, with Sadie's marriage with Jimmy already beyond repair, she begins a tryst with local mechanic Robert Sugden (Karl Davies) until their respective families learn about it several months later. Sadie also finds herself romantically involved with Cain, as the pair's on-off romance begins to develop as time goes on. Sadie later enlists Cain's help again to blackmail her way back into Tom's business empire, King & Sons, and ends up buying the land the Kings wanted for their development venture. Later on Sadie has sex with Cain but rejects his advances, so Cain retaliates by killing Sadie's dog Damon the following day.

A few months later, Sadie blackmails the Kings' business rival Zoe Tate (Leah Bracknell) into selling Home Farm to Tom himself. This impresses Tom, as he seeks to own Home Farm to further establish his family empire. When Jimmy's youngest brother Max (Charlie Kemp) dies in a road collision caused by Robert himself, Sadie uses Tom's vulnerability to her advantage.

It soon transpires that Sadie has harboured romantic feelings for her eldest brother-in-law Matthew (Matt Healy) and the two embark on an affair before Jimmy finds out about it. As Tom prepares to step down from running the company and hand it over to Matthew, just as Sadie has wanted, Jimmy exposes the affair and Tom gives Matthew an ultimatum: either Sadie or the family business. Matthew chooses the latter, devastating Sadie.

In March 2006, Sadie resurfaces and has rebounded herself by becoming engaged to wealthy aristocrat Alasdair Sinclair (Ray Coulthard). At first the pair get married, but then minutes later Matthew disrupts the ceremony and confesses his love for Sadie, who eventually chooses him over Alasdair in front of their respective families. When Tom responds by disowning Matthew from the family, Sadie convinces Matthew to compete against his family by buying their rival's haulage business.

By then, Tom's business development called the "Kings River Showhouse" is set to commence and Jimmy is placed in charge as the planner. Seeking revenge on them, Sadie goes behind Matthew's back and pays Cain to sabotage the opening of the Kings' business venture. Jimmy then discovers her dalliance with Cain and confronts Sadie on the day of its opening, but then the building suddenly explodes and three people are killed; the victims include local villager Dawn Woods (Julia Mallam), fellow resident Noreen Bell (Jenny Tomasin), and estate agent David Brown (Peter Alexander). During the disaster, Sadie attacks Jimmy and knocks him out. Jimmy survives and tells Matthew what Sadie did. When Matthew confronts Sadie over this, she confesses to staging the explosion and he furiously responds by breaking up with her.

Weeks later, Sadie devises a last-ditch plot with Cain to kidnap Tom and steal £5 million. At first Cain kidnaps Sadie as well to get revenge for her schemes against him; he later shoots Sadie, seemingly killing her, but it is subsequently revealed to have been staged and Sadie was in fact colluding with Cain all along. Cain then double crosses Sadie and flees with the ransom money, abandoning her at an airfield. Sadie then leaves alone, driving off in her car.

== Reception ==
Kensit's portrayal of Sadie earned her the Best Bitch award at the 2005 and 2006 Inside Soap Award ceremonies, respectively. She was also nominated for Sexiest Female at the 2006 British Soap Awards. Sadie's and Cain's exit was nominated for Best Single Episode at the 2007 British Soap Awards.

The scenes during the episode featuring Sadie and Cain's exit where they kidnap Tom King and Cain appears to shoot Sadie received 37 complaints to media regulator Ofcom. ITV defended the storyline by saying it was one of the most "exciting and successful" events in the serial's history and added "Whilst Emmerdale stories do not condone violent acts, it need not and should not shy away from them." 8.5 million viewers tuned in for the episode.
