= Ray Kelvin =

Founder and former chief executive of Ted Baker

Ray Kelvin CBE
- Born: Raymond Stuart Kelvin; 11 December 1955 (age 70); London, England
- Education: JFS
- Occupation: Businessman
- Known for: Founder and former chief executive of Ted Baker
- Spouses: Georgia Slowe (m. 1993; div. 2000) Clare Kelvin (m. 2012)
- Children: 3

Raymond Stuart Kelvin CBE (born on 11 December 1955 in north London) is a British fashion designer, the founder and former chief executive of the retail clothing company Ted Baker. He founded the Ted Baker brand in 1988 when he opened a shop specialising in men's shirts in Glasgow. He left the company in 2019.

== Early life and education ==
Kelvin, who is Jewish, grew up in Edmonton, north London, and was educated at JFS. He started working in his grandfather's menswear shop in Enfield at the age of eleven.

== Harassment allegations ==
A former employee created a petition in 2018 that received 2,000 signatures to put an end to his hugs and allegedly inappropriate activities with staff, as a result of an unconfirmed lack of support from Ted Baker's HR department. On 7 December 2018, it was announced that Kelvin would be taking voluntary leave of absence from the company. On 4 March 2019, following an internal independent committee investigation, it was announced that Kelvin had resigned and would be leaving Ted Baker with immediate effect. Kelvin came back to the firm on an advisory basis about a year after the "forced hugging" scandal.

== Awards ==
Kelvin was awarded an honorary doctorate in business administration from the University of Bath in 2007. In the 2011 New Year Honours, he was appointed Commander of the Order of the British Empire (CBE) for services to the fashion industry.

== Personal life ==
Kelvin was married for six years to actress Georgia Slowe before splitting up in 1999 and divorcing in 2000. They have two sons. In March 2012, Kelvin married his second wife, Clare (formerly Clare Kavanagh), with whom he has a daughter.

In his spare time he enjoys fly fishing.
