= Black Arrow (1985 film) =

1985 TV film by John Hough

- Genre: Adventure; History
- Written by: David Pursall; Peter Welbeck
- Directed by: John Hough
- Starring: Oliver Reed; Fernando Rey; Donald Pleasence; Benedict Taylor; Stephan Chase; Georgia Slowe
- Music by: Stanley Myers
- Country of origin: United States
- Original language: English

Production
- Executive producer: Jesús María López-Patiño
- Producers: Harry Alan Towers; Michael-John Biber; Andrés Vicente Gómez
- Cinematography: John Cabrera
- Editor: Geoffrey Foot
- Running time: 93 minutes
- Production companies: Cabo Blanco Production Inc. Compañía Iberoamericana de TV; Jerawood Limited

Original release
- Release: January 6, 1985

Black Arrow is a Disney made-for-television romantic adventure film filmed in 1984 and released in 1985, based on the novel by Robert Louis Stevenson, The Black Arrow: A Tale of the Two Roses. It was a Panatlantic Pictures release directed by John Hough, who had directed a filmatisation of another Stevenson novel, Treasure Island, in 1972. It was released on January 6, 1985, for broadcast on The Disney Channel and distribution on Disney Home Video VHS.

== Plot ==
During the Wars of the Roses (1455–1487), Sir Daniel is a powerful, unscrupulous knight, surrounded by equally treacherous retainers, Oates, Sykes, Appleyard, and Scar. Since the white rose of the House of York is in the ascendant, Sir Daniel and his household are loyal to York and the white rose. The film takes place just before Richard Neville, 16th Earl of Warwick's rebellion against Edward IV (1469–1471).

Some twelve years prior to this Daniel, Oates, Sykes, and Appleyard perjured themselves to attaint a nobleman, who later would go by the name of "Black Arrow". He went to France in exile while his five-year-old daughter Joanna was made a ward of Sir Daniel. Black Arrow had not seen his daughter for twelve years since she had been kept in a convent during the wars. Sir Daniel was also the guardian of his nephew Richard, who is trained to fight by Scar.

Scar and Richard are unaccountably enemies. On the eve of Richard's twenty-first birthday he is finally able to defeat Scar, although Scar is handicapped by his left hand tied behind his back. Daniel's court then hails him as Sir Richard after he takes the oath to be loyal to the white rose of the house of York.

Sir Daniel arranges for Black Arrow's now seventeen-year-old daughter Joanna to be brought from the convent to his castle to keep her from being rescued by her father. He also plans to marry her to take full possession of her inheritance.

Appleyard is sent by Sir Daniel to one of his tenants to confiscate livestock for the Earl of Warwick's upcoming visit. Richard is also sent to assist Appleyard. Appleyard surmises that Black Arrow will confront him, which he does. Black Arrow accompanied by Lawless and armed with a long bow succeeds in killing Appleyard, armed with a crossbow. Richard challenges the outlaws to a duel with staves, but he is beaten and sent back to Sir Daniel.

Joanna at Sir Daniel's castle is being prepared for marriage. She is a defiant adherent to the red rose of Lancaster, and she outrages Sir Richard by daring to wear a red rose in Sir Daniel's household. Richard angrily snatches the red rose off Joanna's dress and crushes it.

The Earl of Warwick comes to Sir Daniel's castle for a visit during which time Sir Daniel persuades him to outlaw Black Arrow. Warwick is eager to help Sir Daniel because he wants to enlist his help in his future revolt against King Edward.

Joanna overhears Sir Daniel and Warwick planning for her marriage, so she steals Sir Richard's clothing while he is bathing and escapes from the castle. Sir Richard is sent by Sir Daniel to recapture her and take her to York where Sir Daniel and Warwick have gone. Secretly Sir Daniel sends Scar and men-at-arms to kill Sir Richard and frame Black Arrow for his murder so as to take over his inheritance.

Joanna succeeds in ambushing Sir Richard, who in turn overpowers her. While this is going on Scar shoots Sir Richard in the shoulder, but Joanna comes to his rescue. Hearing the approach of Scar and his companions Joanna rides off to draw them away from where Sir Richard lies gravely wounded. She is then captured by Scar and his men and taken to York. Sir Richard is discovered by Black Arrow and his men, who subsequently capture Scar. Sir Richard recovers sufficiently to engage Scar in close combat, which ends in Scar's death.

In York, Oates reminds Sir Daniel that he will be a bigger land owner than Warwick and, then, double-crosses him by going to Warwick with the information that it was Sir Daniel that had Sir Richard killed. Oates is also fortunate in capturing Black Arrow and his companion Will, when the two arrive in York incognito to stop Joanna's marriage to Sir Daniel. Sir Richard manages to get to Warwick in York. Warwick, who is wary of Sir Daniel, grants Sir Richard's request to release Black Arrow and his companion. During Sir Daniel's wedding it is Richard, Black Arrow and Will who stand up to show just cause why Sir Daniel and Joanna should not be joined in marriage. Oates also stands up denouncing Sir Daniel as a murderer. Sir Daniel dispatches Oates with a tossed dagger. Sir Richard fights blade to blade with Sir Daniel but is disarmed and nearly killed, but Black Arrow succeeds in killing Sir Daniel with a black arrow. Sir Richard and Joanna marry and ride off into the sunset, ostensibly heading for Sir Daniel's castle which Sir Richard has automatically inherited.

== Cast ==
- Benedict Taylor as Sir Richard
- Georgia Slowe as Joanna
- Oliver Reed as Sir Daniel
- Fernando Rey as the Earl of Warwick
- Stephan Chase as Black Arrow
- Donald Pleasence as Oates
- Roy Boyd as Will Lawless
- Adolf Sambrell as Scar
- Carol Gotell as Hannah
- Robert Russell Appleyard
- Frank Braña as Sykes
- Ralph Brown as Yardley

== Production ==
It was noted by The New York Times in April 1984 that Black Arrow was "currently in production". The film was described as being filmed in Spain with a September airdate. This planned airdate was later shifted towards January 6, 1985 when Black Arrow appeared on the Disney Channel.

== See also ==
- The Black Arrow (1948)
