= Agatha Christie: A Life in Pictures =

- Genre: Docudrama
- Written by: Richard Curson Smith
- Directed by: Richard Curson Smith
- Starring: Olivia Williams; Anna Massey; Raymond Coulthard
- Composer: Andrew Phillips
- Country of origin: United Kingdom
- Original language: English

Production
- Executive producers: Jacquie Hughes; Leanne Klein
- Producer: Colette Flight
- Running time: 90 minutes

Original release
- Network: BBC Two
- Release: 22 September 2004

Related
- George Orwell: A Life in Pictures; Elizabeth David: A Life in Recipes; H. G. Wells: War with the World

Agatha Christie: A Life in Pictures is a 2004 BBC Television docudrama telling the life story of the British crime-writer Agatha Christie in her words.

== Cast ==
- Olivia Williams as Agatha Christie
  - Anna Massey as older Agatha Christie
  - Bonnie Wright as younger Agatha Christie
- Raymond Coulthard as Archie Christie
- Stephen Boxer as Psychiatrist
- Anthony O'Donnell as DCC William Kenward and Hercule Poirot
- Mark Gatiss as Kenyon
- Richard Leaf as Gunman
- Celia Montague as Clarissa Miller
- Vicki Pepperdine as Carlo Fisher
- Bertie Carvel as Max Mallowan
- Rosa Curson Smith as Rosalind
- Olivia Darnley as Nurse
- Edmund Kingsley as Soldier
- Tim McMullan as Pharmacist
- James Tucker as Reggie
- Laura Maclaine as Maid
- Gregory Finnegan as Band Member
- Cara Chase as Woman on Train
