= Land Gold Women =

- Theatrical release poster
- Directed by: Avantika Hari
- Written by: Avantika Hari
- Produced by: Vivek B. Agrawal
- Starring: Narinder Samra; Neelam Parmar; Christopher Villiers; Hassani Shapi; Aaron Virdee; Laurence Saunders
- Cinematography: David Rom
- Edited by: Shyam K. Salgonkar
- Music by: Amar Mohile
- Production company: A Richer Lens Production
- Release date: 2 December 2011
- Running time: 98 minutes
- Countries: India; United Kingdom
- Language: English

Land Gold Women is a 2011 British-Indian film written and directed by Avantika Hari, a graduate of the London Film School. The film is produced by Mumbai-based Vivek Agrawal. It is the first film in English that deals with the issue of honor killings. The film won India's National Film Award for Best Feature Film in English, which was shared between Hari and Agrawal. The award was presented by the President of India, Pratibha Patil.

== Production ==
=== Development ===
Director and writer Avantika Hari was born in Mumbai, India and raised in Dubai. She is of Tamil origin. After completing high school, she pursued further education in the United Kingdom and United States.

She developed the idea for Land Gold Women, her directorial debut, after reading a newspaper article about an honor killing while she was studying for her master's degree at London Film School.

Taking an interest in the topic, Hari arranged to meet with victims of honor crimes and was moved by their stories, spurring her to make the film. During the process of developing the film, Hari met Vivek Agarwal in Mumbai, who joined the project after reading Hari's script. Hari and Agarwal would later marry.

Hari chose to write the film's characters as Muslim to confront the stereotype that honour killings are tied to the Islamic faith, telling Verve magazine, "I decided to come to this stereotype and break the myth that that it is religiously condoned."

=== Casting ===
Hari and Agarwal held an open casting call in London for the film, meeting over 600 actors over the course of four months. Of the decision to cast little-known actors for the film, Hari said, "[..] I want this to feel as if it can happen in your house, in your neighbour’s house, to someone you know. So there is a sense that the family is very real and this is a very real issue that we are dealing with.” Narinder Samra was cast to play the role of Nazir Ali Khan due to his likeable appearance, telling the Indian Express, "We wanted an actor whom the audience would first love on screen so that the transformation comes as a shock."

=== Filming ===
Land Gold Women was shot in the 2008 in Birmingham and is an Indo-UK production made under A Richer Lens, the production banner Avantika Hari and Vivek Agrawal now run together. Filming reportedly took 28 days.

== Plot ==
Set in modern Birmingham, Land Gold Women revolves around a small British Indian family caught between their traditional past and the tumultuous, faction-driven present. Nazir Ali Khan, a soft-spoken, 45-year-old professor of history at a university in Birmingham, emigrated from India in the 1980s. He made Birmingham his home with his conservative wife Rizwana and their two children, Saira, 17 and Asif, 14. He indulges their interests in all things English and Western but now finds himself increasingly nostalgic about his roots.

Saira, with a year to complete her graduation, is excited at the prospect of going to university to pursue her interest in Literature. She also hopes that this will give her more time to spend with David, her aspiring writer boyfriend. At this critical juncture in her life, Nazir finds himself feeling increasingly conflicted at the thought of his daughter going out into the big bad world. His fears are further strengthened by the arrival of his older brother Riyaaz from India. A staunch traditional man, Riyaaz arrives with a proposal of marriage for Saira. A man of his word, who takes great pride in his roots, Riyaaz doesn't intend on taking a ‘no’ for an answer.

With the threat of an illicit relationship looming over his head and the prospect of getting cut off from the rest of his family, Nazir finds himself at the brink of a terrible decision to make: Should he save face? Or save his daughter?

== Cast ==
- Narinder Samra - Nazir Ali Khan
- Neelam Parmar - Saira Nazir
- Christopher Villiers - Timothy James
- Ali Zahoor - Asif Nazir Khan
- Hassani Shapi - Riyaaz Ali Khan
- Aaron Virdee - Izzy's Friend
- Laurence Saunders - Police Officer
- Terry Pearson - Professor George
- Laila Vakil - Farha Siddiqui
- Renu Brindle - Rizwana Nazir
- Caroline Frewin - Solicitor
- Richard Kelly - David Reid

== Distribution ==
=== Theatrical release and awards ===
The film has been screened at the International Film Festival of India IFFI held in Goa. At IFFI, the film was part of the Indian Panorama section which selects 26 of the Best feature films from the country. It also screened at the European Film Market and the Berlin Film Festival.

Land Gold Women won the Foreign Correspondence Association 'Purple Orchid' Award for Best Feature Film at the Asian Festival of First Films in Singapore. The Award was won by the film for "An Engaging Story line which reaches out to an International Audience". The film benefited from a strong performance by the cast, a compelling story line and a well crafted production. It also won the award for Best Script/Screenplay for Avantika Hari. The film was further nominated in the Best Producer and Jury Best Film Awards.

In the North American circuit, it got the Royal Reel Award for Excellence in Film making at the 2010 Canada International Film Festival, the Best of Show Award at Indie Fest and won 3 awards at the Reel Heart International Film Festival held in Toronto, Ontario. The awards were, Best Film (Runner up), Best Actor for Narendra Samra and Best Cinematography for David Rom.

The film has received numerous nominations in various categories at International Film Festivals. The soundtrack of the film was nominated for an Award at the East End Film Festival held every year in London. The film also received a nomination for Best UK first Feature for Avantika Hari.

=== Home media ===
Land Gold Women was released on DVD before being released in theatres, a decision that was made to facilitate private ore-release screenings for NGOs and higher education institutions. The film was added to the Netflix streaming service in 2018.

=== Reception ===
"Land Gold Women is not a film for feeble-minded or those looking for Bollywood style happy endings", writes Preeti Arora.
