= The Brothers (radio show) =

The Brothers is a BBC Radio 4 sitcom about two brothers who gave up their careers in order to start a website design company. It aired from May 2004-March 2007. There were sixteen half-hour episodes over three series. It starred Adam Godley, Raymond Coulthard, Pauline McLynn and Pearce Quigley and was written by Caroline and David Stafford.

== Notes and references ==
Lavalie, John. "The Brothers" EpGuides. 21 Jul 2005. 29 Jul 2005
