= Julia Mallam =

English actress

- Born: 1 August 1982 (age 43); Doncaster, England
- Occupation: Actress
- Years active: 2001–present
- Known for: Emmerdale; Captain Mack

Julia Mallam (born 1 August 1982) is an English actress. She is best known for the roles of Dawn Woods in the ITV soap opera Emmerdale and Tracy Trickster in the CITV series Captain Mack.

== Career ==
Mallam made her professional acting debut in 2001 as Jane Greenwood in Peak Practice. She appeared as Dawn Hope in Emmerdale between 2003 and 2006, when her character died of cardiac arrest after being injured in a house explosion.

She appeared in Soapstar Superchef with Sherrie Hewson in 2007. They reached the final, losing to Hayley Tamaddon and Mathew Bose. later that year, she appeared in an episode of the police drama The Bill. In 2008, she played various characters in the children's television series Captain Mack.

== Filmography ==
Year	Title	Role	Notes
2001	Peak Practice	Jane Greenwood	one episode
2001	Take Me	Maggie Chambers	
2002	Fat Friends	Angel	one episode
2002	Stan the Man	Hayley	one episode
2003–2006	Emmerdale	Dawn Woods	series regular
2007	Soapstar Superchef	Herself	alongside Sherrie Hewson
2007	Doctors	Catherine Laker	one episode
2007	The Bill	Olivia Rossington	one episode
2008	Captain Mack	Tracy Trickster	fifty episodes
2008	Small Things	Harriet	short film
2009	Casualty	Manda	one episode
2010	Doctors	Abby Fuller	one episode
2011	Tyrannosaur	Drunk Woman	film
2012	That Day	Lisa	short film
