= Kenneth Farrington =

English retired actor (born 1936)

- Born: Kenneth William Farrington; 18 April 1936 (age 90); Dulwich, London, England
- Occupation: Actor
- Years active: 1959–2020
- Spouse: Patricia Heneghan (m. 1961; div. 1981)
- Children: 4

Kenneth William Farrington (born 18 April 1936) is an English retired actor. He first came to fame playing the role of Billy Walker, wayward son of publican Annie, in ITV's longest-running soap opera, Coronation Street. Following a brief period as a film actor, Farrington secured the role of power-hungry Tom King in Emmerdale from 2004 until 2006.

== Early life ==
Farrington was born in Dulwich, south London, and attended Alleyn's School. He was taught by Michael Croft, who advised him not to take up acting as a professional.

== Career ==
Farrington's first major role was as Jack Marvel in the 1960 series, The Splendid Spur, but he came to prominence playing the role of Billy Walker, wayward son of publican Annie, in ITV's long-running soap opera, Coronation Street, having previously been considered for the role of Jed Stone. He joined the series in 1961, continuing in the role on and off until leaving the show for good in 1984.

Farrington played long-suffering Chief Inspector Teal's right-hand man in the TV series The Saint and also appeared in episodes of The Avengers, Redcap and Z-Cars. He appeared in films such as Submarine X-1 (1968) and Party Party (1983). Farrington worked with the Manchester Drama Group, with whom cast members of Coronation Street often performed in the 1970s.

In 1974, he directed Anne Kirkbride in a lunchtime production of David Halliwell's Muck from Three Angles at the Grapes Hotel in Quay Street. Kirkbride's character in the soap, Deirdre, was a love interest of Billy Walker around this time. In 1990 he played the role of joiner Mr Edwards in an episode of All Creatures Great And Small titled "Knowin' How To Do It". In 1993 he appeared in an episode of Heartbeat, playing Vic Kennis (as Ken Farrington).

Beginning in 1997 he played the continuing role of Jack Gates, father of Hart family matriarch Annie Hart (played by Liz Crowther), in the soap opera Family Affairs. His character was killed off in late 1998 (several weeks prior to the entire Hart family being killed off) as part of a drastic revamp of that series.

In 2004, Farrington joined the ITV soap opera Emmerdale, playing the character Tom King. After three years in the role, he announced his departure on 8 August 2006. Speaking about his decision to quit the show, Farrington said: "I originally came to Emmerdale for just six months and I have ended up staying for three years. Even during my 25 years at Coronation Street, two years at a time was my longest stint. I have thoroughly enjoyed my time at Emmerdale but feel it is time to move on."

Emmerdale series producer Kathleen Beedles said: "Ken has been an asset to the show and will be greatly missed but his exit storyline is going to be extremely dramatic and memorable for viewers, which we're very excited about." Farrington's exit scenes aired on Christmas Day 2006, as his character is pushed to his death from a bedroom window in a major whodunnit storyline.

After leaving Emmerdale, Farrington appeared in an episode of daytime medical drama Doctors as "self-made builder-turned-property developer" Brian Meeson. Farrington previously appeared in Doctors in 2000.

== Personal life ==
He was married to actress Patricia Heneghan from 1961 to 1981; they have three children.

== Filmography ==
- One Way Pendulum (1965) – Stan
- The Knack ...and How to Get It (1965) – Guardsman (uncredited)
- Robbery (1967) – Seventh Robber
- Submarine X-1 (1969) – C.P.O. Boker Knowles
- Party Party (1983) – Dad
- Dinosaur (2020) (short) – Walter
