= Ted Baker =

British clothing retail company

ABG-TB IPCO (UK) Limited

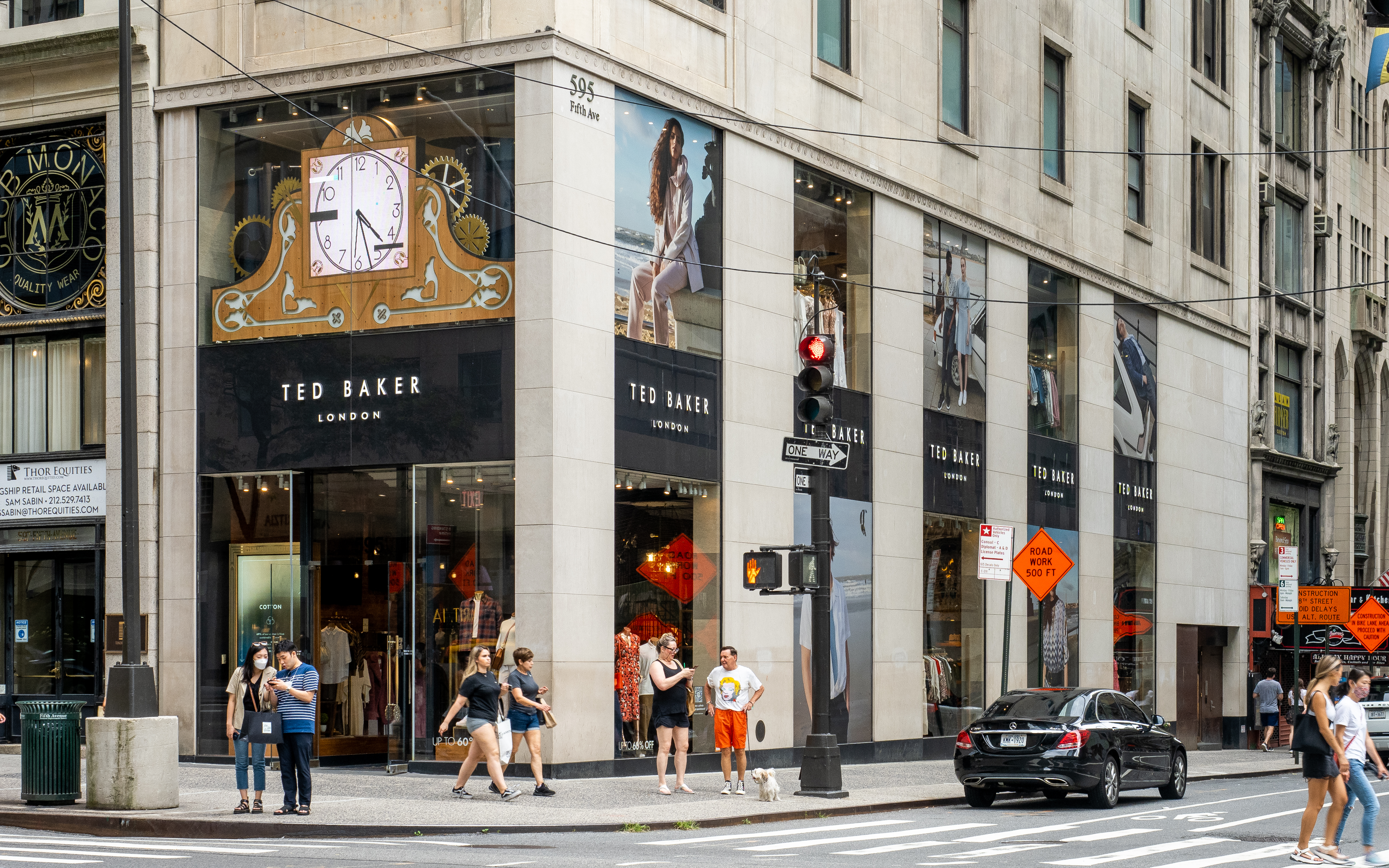
- Ted Baker store in Midtown Manhattan, New York
- Trade name: Ted Baker
- Type: Private
- ISIN: GB0001048619
- Industry: Fashion
- Founded: Glasgow, Scotland (1988)
- Founder: Ray Kelvin
- Headquarters: London, England
- Products: Ready-to-wear; footwear; accessories; homewear
- Revenue: ▲£617.4 million (2019)
- Operating income: ▼£54.5 million (2019)
- Net income: ▼£40.7 million (2019)
- Owner: Authentic Brands Group (2022–present)
- Website: tedbaker.com

Ted Baker is a British clothing brand founded in 1988 in Glasgow, Scotland. The brand is styled as 'Ted Baker, London', and is known for male and female clothing, accessories, aftershaves and perfumes.

At its peak, the brand had over 500 shops and concessions around the world, and was regarded as a desirable, high status fashion brand. The company was acquired by Authentic Brands Group, the American owners of Reebok, for £211 million in October 2022. In March 2024, Ted Baker called in the administrators for its European operations, due to years of problems, poor sales, and mounting debts. In April 2024, Ted Baker's global operation was reported as close to collapse, with mass shop closures, and bankruptcy. As of August 2024, all Ted Baker UK and Ireland branches of the store were due to close. Ted Baker’s ecommerce operations were purchased by United Legwear & Apparel Co. and its website was relaunched in November 2024.

== History ==
Founder Ray Kelvin named the company after a self-styled alter ego, an "intrepid aviator, an all-round sportsman and the consort of princesses and Hollywood beauties". Kelvin opened his first Ted Baker store in March 1988 in Glasgow, and soon opened further stores in Manchester and Nottingham. In 1990, Ted Baker opened a store in Covent Garden, London, with further stores in London's Soho, Nottingham and Leeds. A new range, Ted Baker Woman, was launched in 1995. The next few years were a time of rapid expansion, with Ted Baker stores, and wholesale operations, opening all over the world, and Ted Baker product lines expanding. In 1998, the company launched their first website. The company moved into their London headquarters, The Ugly Brown Building, in 2000.

Sales of Ted Baker would remain strong throughout the early 2000s. In October 2009, the first problems for the brand were reported, with The Independent's financial section reporting problems in Ted Baker's wholesale sales. At this time, Ted Baker shares traded for 460.75p. Over the next few years, Ted Baker would continue opening stores around the world, including in August 2012, a Ted Baker store on Fifth Avenue in New York. In 2014, Ted Baker launched luggage, home fragrance, and audio, as well as collections. As of 2018, Ted Baker had 500 stores and concessions worldwide: 192 in the UK, 98 in Europe, 111 in the US and Canada, 80 in the Middle East, Africa, and Asia, and nine in Australia. The company purchased its London headquarters for £58.25 million in 2017. Despite certain problems, the 2010s would see sustained growth for the company. In March 2018, Ted Baker shares reached their all-time high price of 3,214p a share.

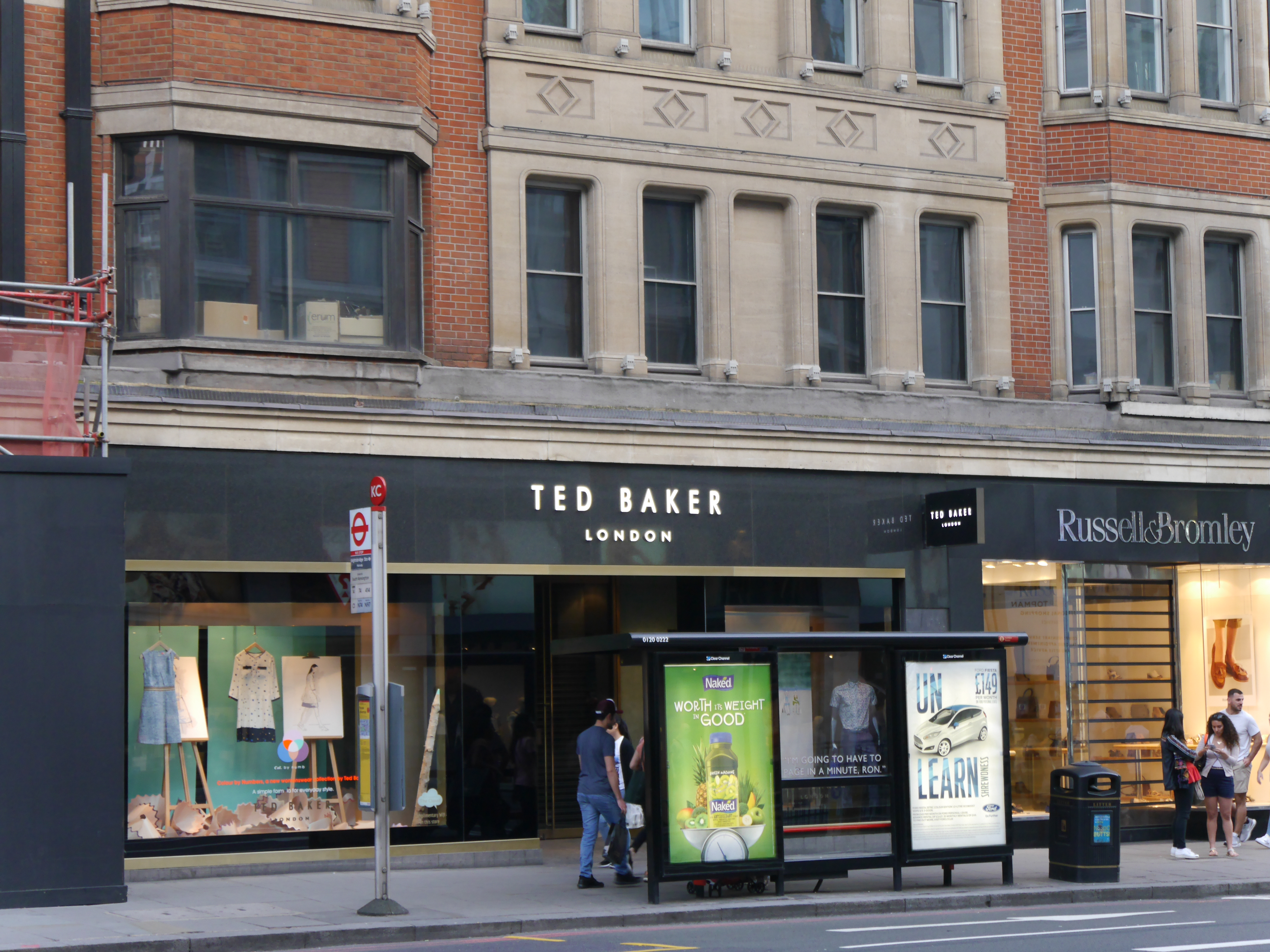
Ted Baker store, Brompton Road, London in 2016

=== Decline and fall ===
2018 saw Ted Baker mark 30 years as a company, by releasing a range of celebratory 30-year anniversary items, and the company's first official advertising campaign. However, 2018 would prove to be a very difficult year for the brand. In December 2018, allegations against founder and CEO Ray Kelvin emerged, with petition signed by 300 current and past employees accusing Kelvin of 'forced hugging'. After initially taking a leave of absence in response to allegations, on 4 March 2019, it was announced that Kelvin had resigned, and would be leaving the company immediately, with Lindsay Page taking over as CEO. At this time, the retailer also issued a profit warning, after writing off £5m of unsold clothes. At this time, Ted Baker shares were trading at 1,973.5p. In December 2019, poor trading figures led to Page and executive chairman David Bernstein stepping down from their roles, and Rachel Osborne being appointed acting CEO.

In 2019, The Observer criticised Ted Baker for "high prices and out-of-step styling", noting that the brand had been overtaken by multiple competitors. The Observer also cited excessive diversification as one of the reasons for the brand's decline. In 2019, the company issued four profit warnings, including blaming unseasonably warm weather during what would traditionally be the beginning of the Autumn/Winter selling season. Ted Baker's troubles continued in 2020, as in January 2020, the firm revealed that an accounting error was twice as big as had been previously thought, leaving a £58m hole in its balance sheet. In April 2020, Ted Baker furloughed nearly 2,000 employees, around 75% of their workforce, including head office staff, due to the COVID-19 pandemic. The company also suspended non-essential capital expenditure and halted any discretionary operating expenses. In March 2020, the company sold their London headquarters, The Ugly Brown Building, for £78.8m. At this time, Ted Baker's problems started attracting wide attention in the media, with the company referred to in the media as 'struggling' and 'troubled'.

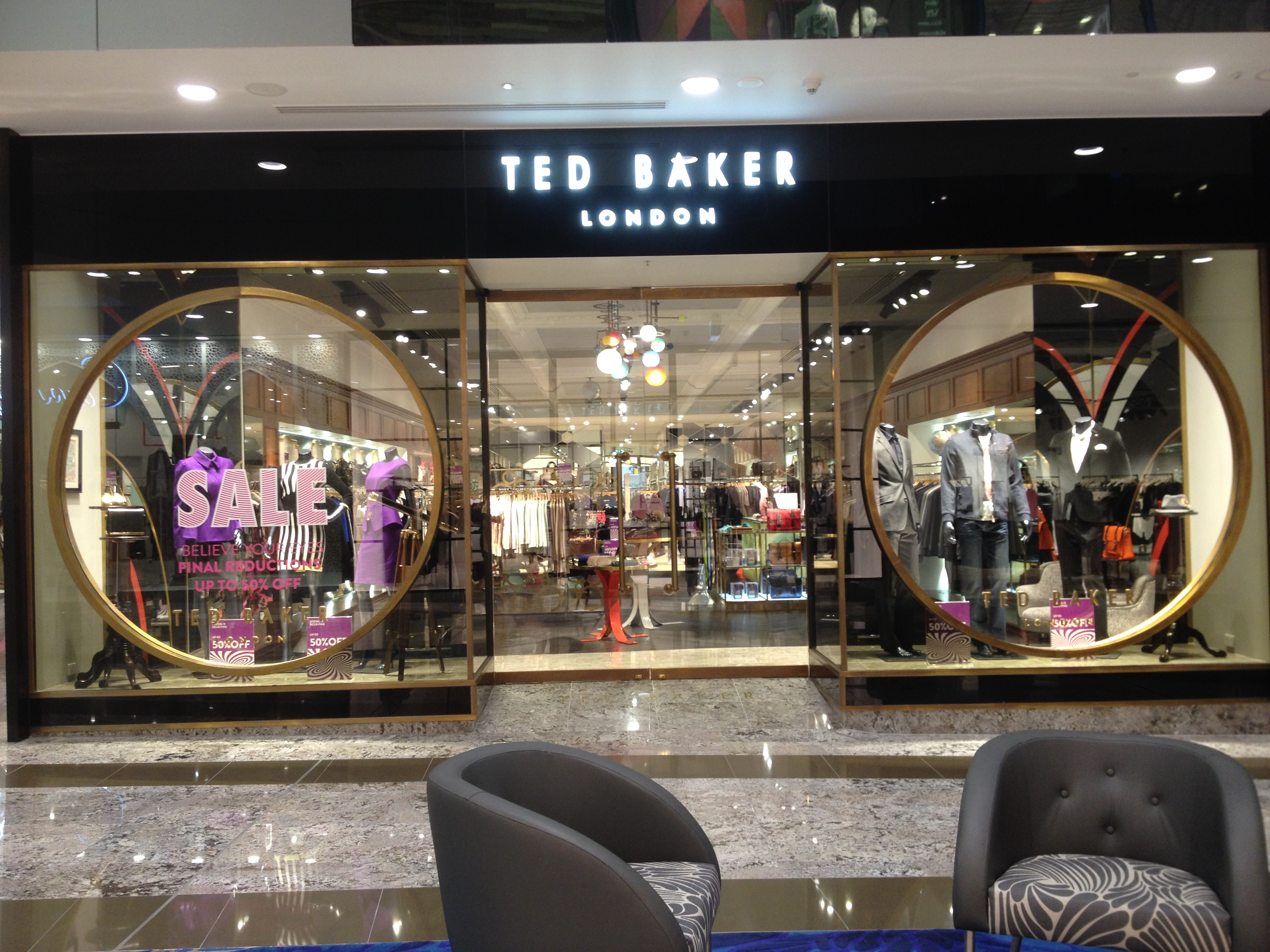
Ted Baker store in Brisbane, Australia

In October 2022, after years of troubles, and falling sales, Ted Baker was acquired by Authentic Brands Group (ABG) for £211 million. Authentic Brands, owners of Reebok and the David Beckham brands, pledged to revive the fortunes of the Ted Baker brand. Under the terms of the ABG takeover, Ted Baker plc's shareholders were paid £1.10 per share, as the deal marked the end of the company's listing on the London Stock Exchange. Despite the takeover, the decline of Ted Baker continued without any sign of reversal. In June 2023, Osborne stepped down as the company's chief executive.

In February 2024, ABG severed ties with AARC, the company which had been running its Ted Baker stores and e-commerce business in Europe. AARC had reportedly "failed to inject promised funding into the business and meet its financial obligations to Authentic". The company also announced in February that it could not pay rent for its British shops. In March it was announced that No Ordinary Designer Label (NODL), the holding company for Ted Baker's retail and online operations in the UK and Europe, had filed intention to appoint administrators to the European operations of the ailing business. The move puts up to 1,000 jobs at risk. ABG's chief strategy and transition officer John McNamara blamed the problems to the period of AARC control.

Analysing the brand's fall in 2024, financial expert Gary Hemming, said: "Ted Baker has faced a torrid few years after their founder left the business in 2019 following allegations of inappropriate behaviour. This had led to a real domino effect for the brand as reputational damage coupled with instability in the company hierarchy saw Ted Baker head into the pandemic in a sorry state. While most retail brands reacted quickly and adapted to the new market, there was a feeling that Ted Baker, already reeling, failed to do so. From there, a death spiral has ensued as the brand has slipped to irrelevance, being replaced by newer, fresher brands that have managed to capture the interest of shoppers."

=== In administration ===
In April 2024, Ted Baker's administrators, Teneo, announced the closure of 15 Ted Baker shops across the UK, with 245 redundancies, leaving Ted Baker with 31 stores and 564 staff in UK and Ireland, as Teneo attempt to find a buyer to rescue the remains of the business. On 24 April 2024, Ted Baker Canada filed for creditor protection in Canada. Ted Baker U.S. declared Chapter 15 bankruptcy that same day, blaming the operation suppliers of Authentic Brands Group for failing to pay. As a result, it was announced that all U.S. and Canada Ted Baker stores, as well as all Brooks Brothers and Lucky Brand stores in Canada, would close. On April 29, it was reported that Ted Baker's European operation was facing collapse. In May 2024, it was reported that Ted Baker’s largest creditor, Secure Trust Bank, had fallen out with the chain’s administrators, Teneo, over claims of a conflict of interest. In May, it was reported that the Frasers Group were considering a deal to take control of Ted Baker's UK operations. In July, it was announced that Ted Baker's Dutch unit was bankrupt. In August it was announced that all seven Ted Baker outlets in Ireland would shut, and that talks with Frasers Group had stalled, meaning the remaining 31 UK stores would also close, putting more than 500 jobs at risk. As of August 2024, Ted Baker branded products will continue to be sold in other stores.

=== Relaunch ===
In November 2024, ABG in conjunction with new operators United Legwear and Apparel, relaunched the brand online with a new website and new products.

== See also ==
- Ben Sherman
- Burton
- Fred Perry
- Marks & Spencer
- Next plc
- River Island
- Superdry
