= Mathew Bose =

British actor (born 1977)

- Born: 3 July 1973 (age 51); London, England
- Education: Crawley College
- Occupation: Actor
- Years active: 1996–present
- Website: mathewbose.com

Mathew Bose (born 3 July 1973) is a British actor. He is best known for his role as Paul Lambert in the soap opera Emmerdale from 2004 to 2010 and again in 2015.

== Life and career ==
Rajat Mathew Bose was born 3 July 1973 in South East London to Dipak and Beverley Bose.

His parents separated when he was very young, and Mathew and his mother, a nurse, lived on a council estate. Bose was shy, and the estate was "rough as a badger's a**e". Often alone while his mother worked, he took up painting and writing as hobbies.

Although he was encouraged by his mother to study business or computer science as a way to earn money, Bose started modelling in his late teens. In his early 20s, he moved to New York City. Most of his friends lived in Los Angeles, however, and he moved there after a short time to enroll in college and obtain a degree in psychology. One of his professors suggested he take acting classes to improve his self-confidence in public speaking.

Bose became hooked on acting after a few classes. He left college, and for a time toured the United States as part of an improvisational comedy tour.

=== Acting career ===
About 2001, Mathew returned to Britain.

Bose began using the first name Mathew when he started acting. "It's slightly controversial to say, but when I first started in acting, I was considered too brown perhaps and too gay perhaps. The first one you could do something about because I can change my name. So Mathew is my English name, so I started using Mathew..."

Bose won his first role at 23, and has since appeared in many shows including the TV sitcoms Coupling, Cutting It, Silent Witness, and It's a Sin. He also had a role in the 2004 motion picture D-Day 6.6.1944. Bose also conducted interviews for, hosted and narrated the 2001 documentary, American Mullet (and the internet shorts The Mullet Chronicles). He has also worked in Italy, most prominently playing Enzo Ferrari's son Alfredo (Dino) Ferrari in the bio-pic of the Ferrari family.

He won the role of Paul Lambert in early 2004 and his Emmerdale debut was in September 2004. In mid 2007, Bose and former castmate Hayley Tamaddon (Del Dingle) were crowned winners of the ITV show, Soapstar Superchef. Co-star Matthew Wolfenden stated in an interview that Bose was the highest scorer on the Wii that is in the games room on the set of Emmerdale.

In Emmerdale, his storylines focused on Paul's love life, as well as his complicated relationship with his parents. Bose told producers of his intense dislike of Paul's one-night stand with Grayson Sinclair, as he felt this was out of character and made gay men look promiscuous. Bose left Emmerdale in 2008, but has since returned for brief stints: first in 2010 (for the wedding of Paul's sister, Nicola King), then again in March and September 2015.

Bose is Celebrity Ambassador for the UK and Ireland charity The Encephalitis Society, and is a patron of The Scratching Post, a cat rescue charity based in Hertfordshire.

In 2011, Bose toured with the Alan Ayckbourn show Season's Greetings.

== Personal life ==
Bose has been openly gay since before he began acting. His partner is television director James Ditchfield. The two began dating about six months before the film D-Day premiered. Bose spent much of the coronavirus pandemic caring for Ditchfield's children.
