= Nick Miles =

English actor

- Born: 15 December 1961 (age 64); Moseley, Birmingham, England
- Occupation: Actor
- Years active: 1993–present
- Spouse: Stephanie Lumb (m. 2006)

Nick Miles (born 15 December 1962) is an English actor. He is best known for his portrayal of Jimmy King in the ITV soap opera Emmerdale. Prior to appearing on Emmerdale, he made appearances in various television series such as Casualty and The Bill.

== Early life ==
Miles was born and raised in Moseley, Birmingham, and he attended the Bromsgrove School. His father, John Bradney, was an actor and director of a local theatre company.

== Career ==
Miles appeared in the music video of the music video of "Come Back to What You Know", recorded by Embrace, playing the role of a policeman. In a similar role in television, he portrayed the role of Chief Supt Guy Mannion in The Bill, starring in 13 episodes between 1999 and 2001. Miles began appearing in Emmerdale from 19 February 2004, portraying the role of Jimmy King, as part of a new fictional family within the programme.

== Filmography ==
- The Bill as Eyeball (1 episode, 1993)
- All Quiet on the Preston Front (1994) as Aspinall
- Dandelion Dead (1994) TV Series as Sgt. Sharp
- Ladybird Ladybird (1994) as Social worker
- She's Out (1995) as Colin
- Backup (1995) as PC John 'Thug' Barrett (15 episodes)
- Soldier Soldier as Derek Cavendish (1 episode, 1996)
- The Loved (1998) as Man
- The Bill as Gerry McKenna (1 episode, 1998)
- Bugs as Dawson (1 episode, 1998)
- The Bill as Ch. Supt. Guy Mannion (13 episodes, 1999–2001)
- Extremely Dangerous (1999) (TV) as Fraser
- Harbour Lights as Lewis Badden (1 episode, 2000)
- Casualty as Lenny (1 episode, 2001)
- Two Men Went to War (2002) as Sgt. Mowat
- Gangs of New York (2002) as Atlantic Guard Leader
- Silent Witness as Sgt. Ron Allan (1 episode, 2002)
- Peak Practice as Gary Wyatt (1 episode, 2002)
- Shell (2002) as John
- Heartbeat as Copley (1 episode, 2003)
- You're Gonna Wake Up One Morning (2003) as Dealer
- England Expects (2004) (TV) as Police officer
- Emmerdale as Jimmy King (1,800+ episodes, 2004–2026)

== Awards and nominations ==
Year	Award	Category	Result	Ref.
2010	British Soap Awards	Best On-Screen Partnership (shared with Nicola Wheeler)	Nominated	
2017	Inside Soap Awards	Funniest Male	Shortlisted	
2021	Inside Soap Awards	Best Actor	Nominated	
2021	Inside Soap Awards	Best Partnership (shared with Nicola Wheeler)	Nominated	
