= Ray Coulthard =

British actor

Raymond Coulthard
- Born: Raymond Anthony Coulthard; 3 September 1968 (age 58); Chester, Cheshire, England
- Occupation: Actor
- Years active: 1992–present
- Partner: Jenna Russell
- Children: 1

Raymond Anthony Coulthard (born 3 September 1968) is a British actor. He is best known for portraying Alasdair Sinclair in Emmerdale and the young Ebenezer Scrooge in The Muppet Christmas Carol, as well as restaurant manager James Schofield in Hotel Babylon.

== Career ==
Coulthard's television appearances include several costume dramas. He played Frank Churchill in the 1996 television adaptation of Jane Austen's novel Emma, Mr Glascock in the 2004 adaptation of He Knew He Was Right, and Miles Edgerton in Mr. Selfridge. In 2005, he appeared in the first series of Extras. He also appeared in the second series of Love Soup, and played Matt Strong in the TV series Casualty during 2010.

Coulthard's film roles include The English Patient, The Best Man, and The Muppet Christmas Carol (in which he played a young Ebenezer Scrooge). He also voiced one of the main characters in the BBC Radio 4 Extra sitcom The Brothers.

Coulthard has acted in many stage productions, especially Shakespeare plays, including work for the Royal National Theatre and the Donmar Warehouse. From 2011 to 2012, he played Duke Vincentio in Measure for Measure and Bishop Santa Cruz in Helen Edmundson's play The Heresy of Love for the Royal Shakespeare Company. He portrayed Lord Egerton in the second series of Mr Selfridge.

In spring 2015, he starred as King George VI alongside Jason Donovan as Lionel Logue in the Chichester Festival Theatre and Birmingham Repertory Theatre production of The King's Speech before touring the UK.

In January 2017 he returned to the Birmingham Repertory Theatre to star in the French comedy What's in a Name? alongside Nigel Harman, Sarah Hadland, Jamie Glover and Olivia Poulet.

== Filmography ==
=== Film ===
Year	Film	Role	Notes
1992	The Muppet Christmas Carol	Young Scrooge	
1996	The English Patient	Rupert Douglas	
1996	Emma	Frank Churchill	TV film
2000	Eisenstein	Grisha	
2004	Agatha Christie: A Life in Pictures	Archie Christie	TV film
2005	The Best Man	Chris	
2007	The Murder of Princess Diana	Anthony	TV film
2018	Red Joan	James Chadwick	

=== Television ===
Year	Film	Role	Notes
1993	Luv	Arthur	1 episode
1995	Castles	Stephen Quin	Series regular
1995	Is It Legal?	Peter	Episode: "Infatuation"
1996	Bugs	Young Man	Episode: "A Cage for Satan"
1996	Rhodes	Neville Pickering	Episode: "All the World's Gold"
2001	The Infinite Worlds of H. G. Wells	Mark Radcliffe	Mini-series
2001	Masterpiece	Prince of Arragon	Episode: "The Merchant of Venice"
2003	Casualty	Guy Edwards	Episode: "Last Man Standing"
2004	Midsomer Murders	Lawrence Haggard	Episode: "The Maid in Splendour"
2004	He Knew He Was Right	Mr. Glascock	Mini-series
2004	Foyle's War	Mark Nicholson	Episode: "The French Drop"
2005	Casanova	Venetian Ambassador	Mini-series
2005	Extras	Mark	Episode: "Ross Kemp & Vinnie Jones"
2006	Emmerdale	Alasdair Sinclair	2 episodes
2006-2009	Hotel Babylon	James Schofield	Series regular
2008	Emmerdale	Alasdair Sinclair	Episode: "Death Becomes Her"
2008	Love Soup	Simon	Episode: "Integrated Logistics"
2008	Masterpiece	Frank Churchill	Episode: "Emma"
2010	Casualty	Matt Strong	6 episodes
2010	New Tricks	Gregory Hampton	Episode: "Coming Out Ball"
2012	Shakespeare: The King's Man	Duke Vincentio	Mini-series
2013	Call the Midwife	Captain Goodacre	Episode: "Christmas Special"
2014	Da Vinci's Demons	Jacob Pasha	3 episodes
2014–2015	Mr Selfridge	Miles Edgerton	Series regular
2016	Father Brown	John Langton	Episode: "The Star of Jacob"
2018	The Royals	Martin Caine	Episode: "Foul Deeds Will Rise"
2018	Doctors	Nick O'Leary	Episode: "A Man on a Mission"
2019	The Rook	Deputy Commissioner Ian Barber	Episode: "Chapter 1"
2020	Silent Witness	DS Donald Hart	Episode: "Seven Times"
2022	Sister Boniface Mysteries	Charles Streatham	Episode: "Scoop!"
