= Kathleen Beedles =

British producer

Kathleen Beedles is a British producer, who has worked on a total of over 2500 episodes of various British soap operas to date. She grew up in Rogart and now resides in London.

== British soaps ==
From 1999 to 2001, Beedles worked as a story associate on Coronation Street before moving onto "Emmerdale" as Story Editor. In 2005, Beedles was appointed Series Producer of British television soap opera Emmerdale, taking over from Steve Frost. She had worked as a producer and series editor for the ITV soap before taking on the role. During her time on the soap, she was responsible for many major storylines, including the Kings River showhome explosion storyline, and the Tom King kidnap plot. She was also responsible for the Who Killed Tom King? storyline, which was nominated for Best Storyline at the 2007 British Soap Awards. Under her tenure Emmerdale was nominated for a BAFTA for three consecutive years, won an RTS Award and the Broadcast Digital Award for the Who Killed Tom King online channel.

In January 2008, it was announced that Beedles was stepping down from her role. She was succeeded by Anita Turner. Her final episode of Emmerdale aired on 29 February 2008.

After Emmerdale, Beedles produced the ITV drama Heartbeat and was a story consultant on "River City" for the BBC. From December 2010, Beedles worked as the Series Story Producer on the BBC soap opera EastEnders. Her first storylines transmitted in March 2011. In March 2012, she decided to step down from her role to join "Hollyoaks" as a story consultant, being credited on both shows for the period June to August 2012. Beedles is now a Drama Development Exec for Lime Pictures.

== Tanglin ==
Kathleen was Supervising Producer and Head Writer on MediaCorp's first English language multi racial soap/longform/daily drama Tanglin. Kathleen was part of the team who created and set up the show. It started airing 30 June 2015 and ran for 823 episodes, the longest running television show in Singapore. Kathleen is now Supervising Producer on the drama series Kin which followed. It has just reached its 500th episode and is hugely popular, surpassing Tanglin.
