= Christopher Villiers =

British actor

- Born: Christopher Francis Villiers; London, England
- Occupation: Actor
- Relatives: Villiers family

Christopher Francis Villiers is a British actor.

== Early life and education ==
Christopher Francis Villiers was born in London, the son of Royal Air Force Volunteer Reserve Wing commander David Hugh Villiers (1921–1962) and his second wife, Elizabeth Barbara, daughter of Leonard Hobbins. His sister, Cat Villiers, is a film producer; brother Jay Villiers is also an actor. A direct descendant of the politician and diplomat Thomas Villiers, 1st Earl of Clarendon, he is a second great-grandson of the Right Reverend Henry Montagu Villiers, Bishop of Durham from 1860 to 1861, whose brothers were George Villiers, 4th Earl of Clarendon, and Charles Pelham Villiers.

He was educated at Stowe School.

== Career ==
In 1983, Villiers played Tom Bertram in a television serial adaptation of Jane Austen's Mansfield Park. In the same year, he starred in the series Sweet Sixteen with Penelope Keith. In 1996, he had a role in Sharpe's Siege. He also appeared in an episode of Adventure Inc. when filming transferred to the UK for four episodes.

He appeared in two episodes of Midsomer Murders as David Whitely in both "The Killings at Badger's Drift" in 1997 and "Death's Shadow" in 1999.

Villiers became well known for playing Grayson Sinclair in the long-running TV soap opera Emmerdale.

He played Captain Nigel Croker in Mile High (2004–2005).

Villiers has appeared on Doctor Who through different mediums. His first appearance was in the 1983 story The King's Demons. In 2007, he guest-starred in the audio drama Absolution. In 2014, Villiers returned to Doctor Who when he guest starred as Professor Moorhouse in the story "Mummy on the Orient Express".

In 2013, he appeared in the Father Brown episode "The Blue Cross" as Justin De Vey. He appeared in By Any Means.

He has appeared in many films, including The Scarlet Pimpernel (1982), Top Secret! (1984), A Hazard of Hearts (1987) and First Knight (1995), Sliding Doors (1998), Bloody Sunday (2002), Kidulthood (2006), and Land Gold Women (2011).

=== Filmmaking ===
In 1995, Villiers co-founded 2020 Casting, Ltd. The company's credits include Gladiator, Bridget Jones's Diary, Shakespeare in Love, Star Wars, United 93.

In 2003, he co-wrote (with actor/playwright/producer Richard Everett) and co-produced (again, with Everett) British feature film, Two Men Went to War (2002).

== Personal life ==
Villiers married journalist Caroline Daniel in 2019, He was previously married to Katie Threlfall.

== Filmography ==
- Lady Killers (1981) - Frederick Bywaters
- Bergerac (1981) - Dougie Cowley
- The Scarlet Pimpernel (1982) – Lord Anthony Dewhurst
- Young Sherlock: The Mystery of the Manor House (1982) – Jasper Moran (8 episodes)
- Top Secret! (1984) – Nigel "The Torch"
- A Hazard of Hearts (1987) – Captain Jackson
- Little Sir Nicholas - William Randle
- First Knight (1995) – Sir Kay
- Princess In Love (1996) – James Hewitt, lover of Diana, Princess of Wales
- Sliding Doors (1998) – Steve
- Bloody Sunday (2002) – Major Steele
- Two Men Went to War (2002) – Dr. Oliver Holmes
- Rosemary and Thyme (2003) And No Birds Sing - Doctor
- Kidulthood (2006) – Mr. Fineal
- From Time to Time (2009) – Officer
- The Shouting Men (2010) – Christopher
- Triassic Attack (2010) – Professor Richmond Keller
- Land Gold Women (2011) – Timothy James
- The Knot (2012) – Mr. Giddings
- Seven Lucky Gods (2014) – Adrian
- Chasing Robert Barker (2015) – Robert Barker
- Silent Hours (2015) – George Barton QC
- The Coroner (2015) – Tim Morris (Series 1 Episode 7)
- The Saint (2017) – Arthur Templar
- The ABC Murders (2018 TV miniseries) – Sir Carmichael Clarke
- Fisherman's Friends (2019 film) – Charles Montague
- Ghosts (2021) – Simeon Colebrooke
- Magic Mike's Last Dance (2023) – Robert
