= Georgia Slowe =

British actress (born 1966)

- Born: 3 June 1966 (age 60); London, England
- Occupation: Actress
- Years active: 1978–present
- Spouses: Ray Kelvin (m. 1993; div. 2000); Stuart McClymont (m. 2017)
- Children: 2

Georgia Slowe (born 3 June 1966) is an English actress. She is best known for playing Perdita Hyde-Sinclair on the British soap opera Emmerdale from 2006 to 2008.

Slowe received a Laurence Olivier Award nomination for her performance as Juliet in a 1989 production of Romeo and Juliet.

== Early life ==
Georgia Slowe was born on 3 June 1966 in London to Jewish parents. Her mother is from Hungary and her father from a Russian family. The family surname was originally Slovedinski, which was anglicized to Slowe. She has one sister, Tania, who is three years older. Her mother, Zsuzsi, left Hungary after the Hungarian Revolution of 1956 at the age of 16.

== Career ==
Slowe began acting when she was a child; in a career that has spanned nearly 30 years, she played the young Maggie Tulliver in the 1978 BBC production of The Mill on the Floss, also working alongside Denholm Elliott (Marco Polo), Jenny Agutter (Secret Places), Angela Lansbury (The Company of Wolves), Oliver Reed (Black Arrow) and Richard Chamberlain (Wallenberg). As a member of the Royal Shakespeare Company, Slowe has starred in numerous theatre productions, including Romeo and Juliet, where she played the doomed heroine twice, alongside Mark Rylance and David Harewood. She and David had a short relationship during the production. In 1989, she was nominated for a Laurence Olivier Award for her performance in the play.

She made a guest appearance on The Family Channel's Zorro as the Native American maiden, Keenona, in its episode "Rites of Passage".

In 2006, Slowe appeared in the long-running serial drama Emmerdale as the new lady of the manor, Perdita Hyde-Sinclair. Her final appearance was broadcast on 22 July 2008, an episode which, for the first time in over three months, had higher viewership than the BBC soap EastEnders.

In 2011, she appeared in the short film Lab Rats. She is a writer and co-producer of the 2014 short film Four Tails, in which she also played a leading role.

Slowe has set up a film production company, Slowe Motion Film.

In 2022, she provided an interview for the 2022 4K Blu-ray release of The Company of Wolves, reminiscing about Angela Carter, as well as her experience working on the film. It was released by Shout! Factory.

== Personal life ==
Slowe was married to Ray Kelvin (founder of the Ted Baker clothing chain) from 1993 until they divorced in 2000. They have two sons. Slowe married photographer Stuart McClymont in 2017.

== Filmography ==
=== Film ===
Year	Title	Role	Notes
1984	Secret Places	Cordelia	
1984	The Company of Wolves	Alice	
1987	The Inquiry	Sara	
2010	Lab Rats	Dr. Rita Riles	

=== Television ===
Year	Title	Role	Notes
1978–1979	The Mill on the Floss	Young Maggie Tulliver	3 episodes
1979	The Enchanted Castle	Mabel	6 episodes
1980	Mackenzie	Lisa Isaacs	2 episodes
1982	The Confessions of Felix Krull	Zouzou	5 episodes
1982	Marco Polo	Caterina	2 episodes
1983	Fraulein Else	Fraulein Else	Television film
1985	Black Arrow	Joanna	Television film
1985	Wallenberg: A Hero's Story	Hannah Moritz	Television film
1986	You'll Never See Me Again	Margaret Alden	Television film
1987	I'll Take Manhattan	Young Lily Davina	2 episodes
1987	Boon	Guiseppina	Episode: "Papa Mafia"
1988	The Attic: The Hiding of Anne Frank	Margot Frank	Television film
1989	Crossbow	Beatrice	Episode: "The Magician"
1990	Zorro	Kinona	Episode: "Rites of Passage"
1992	Witchcraft	Judy Lomax	2 episodes
1993	The Inspector Alleyn Mysteries	Nurse Jane Harben	Episode: "The Nursing Home Murder"
1993	A Bright New Hope for Mankind	Persephone	Television film
2006	Genie in the House	Bonnie Swift	Episode: "Do You Want to Dance?"
2006–2008	Emmerdale	Perdita Hyde-Sinclair	68 episodes
2019	Agatha Raisin	Ellen Partle	Episode: "The Curious Curate"
2020	Bridgerton	Guest 2	Episode: "Oceans Apart"
