= Matthew King (Emmerdale) =

Fictional character from Emmerdale

- Emmerdale character
- Portrayed by: Matt Healy
- Duration: 2004–2008
- First appearance: 4 March 2004
- Last appearance: 16 December 2008
- Introduced by: Steve Frost
In-universe information
- Occupation: Businessman
- Father: Tom King
- Mother: Mary King
- Stepmother: Rosemary King
- Brothers: Jimmy King; Carl King; Max King
- Half-sisters: Scarlett Nicholls
- Grandfathers: Albert King
- Nephews: Thomas King; Elliot Windsor; Carl Holliday
- Nieces: Anya King; Angelica King
- Other relatives: Phyllis King

Matthew King is a fictional character from the British ITV soap opera Emmerdale, played by Matt Healy. He made his first screen appearance during the episode broadcast on 4 March 2004. Matthew arrived as part of the King family, a family of successful businessmen. During his time on the show, Matthew had relationships with several women and was engaged to Anna De Souza (Emma Davies) when he died. Matthew's last appearance was on 16 December 2008.

== Casting ==
In January 2004, The Sun announced that Emmerdale would bring in "three new single 'hunks'" who are all brothers in an attempt to increase the sex appeal of the serial. They announced that the siblings would arrive in February. Actor Matt Healy was cast in the role of second eldest sibling Matthew and made his first appearance on 4 March 2004, following his father Tom and brothers Jimmy and Carl who made their debut appearances in February.

== Development ==
=== Characterisation ===
During his time on the show Matthew was characterised as being the most headstrong and manipulative of the four King brothers. He was proven capable of causing chaos wherever he went, ruining relationships and even causing death. However, he was also shown to be one to stick his neck out for his family and was even hinted to have had police officer DCI Grace Barraclough (Glynis Barber) run over and killed in order to prevent his brother Carl (Tom Lister) from being taken down for the murder of their father. Matthew was also characterised as a notorious womaniser, enjoying flings with the likes of Louise Appleton (Emily Symons). He is arguably best remembered for his affair with his brother Jimmy's (Nick Miles) wife Sadie (Patsy Kensit), which helped to show that the character would go to any lengths to get his own way. Another more vulnerable side of Matthew was shown through his romantic liaison with Perdita Hyde-Sinclair (Georgia Slowe), the wife of Matthew's stepbrother Grayson Sinclair (Christopher Villiers). Matthew and Perdita's relationship helped viewers to relate to Matthew's more romantic side. His more vulnerable side was also explored through his relationship with former fiancé Anna De Souza (Emma Davies). In a storyline that saw Matthew revert to his old ruthless self after he withheld Anna's father Donald De Souza's (Michael Jayston) pills would later lead to the character's demise and comeuppance for his past cunning actions.

=== Who Killed Tom King? ===
On 8 August 2006 it was announced that Ken Farrington, who played Matthew's onscreen father Tom, had quit. Producers announced that the character of Tom King would be killed off in a dramatic whodunit? storyline. It was later revealed that ten suspects for the murder had been revealed, and that Matthew and his brothers were among the ten suspects. The storyline lengthened out from Tom's murder on his wedding day on 25 December 2006 before culminating in the killer being revealed on 17 May 2007. During the storyline Matthew was placed as one of the favorites to be revealed as the killer. The identity of the killer was revealed on 17 May 2007 when all three King brothers stood trial after being accused of conspiring to kill their father after false evidence was given (by this time it had been revealed that either one or all of the King brothers had committed the crime after a secret eleventh ending which sees the trio killing their father was filmed.) Although the episode saw all three brothers avoid prison the episode culminated in Matthew accusing Jimmy of the murder. However, at the end of the episode, the culprit was revealed to be neither Matthew nor Jimmy when Carl confessed to murdering their father.

=== Departure and death ===
On 5 August 2008, Healy announced that he was quitting the show after nearly five years on the show, telling the Daily Star that "After five years of wearing Matthew's suits every morning and having to shave every day, I feel ready to pull on some Bermuda shorts and grow a goatie!" However, he went on to state: "But I've had a brilliant time at Emmerdale and I'm excited about what lies ahead." Series producer Anita Turner said of Healy's decision to quit "Matthew King will leave Emmerdale in an explosive storyline. We wish Matt all the very best." The storyline that lead up to Matthew's "explosive" exit saw him become romantically entangled with newcomer Anna De Souza (Emma Davies), the daughter of Matthew's archenemy and business rival Donald De Souza (Michael Jayston). The storyline saw Matthew and Anna become engaged before Matthew accidentally causes an interfering Donald to die after withholding his heart pills. The storyline then came to a shocking climax on 16 December 2008 when Matthew's brother Carl discovered everything about his brother's deception, prompting him to confront Matthew at his ill fated-wedding day to Anna that led to Carl exposing Matthew's role in Donald's death; causing Anna to abandon the ill-fated wedding before Matthew and Carl engaged in a violent confrontation whilst Jimmy desperately tried to stop them. The episode culminated with Matthew, having disowned Carl for ruining his wedding whilst blaming him for their father's death during a conversation with Jimmy, intending to run down his brother in a van until he notices Anna standing close towards Carl, causing him to swerve and get himself catapulted from the crash, resulting in his death in the process.

== Storylines ==
When the Kings arrived in 2004, Matthew was always the most calculating and scheming of his family. The second son of business supremo Tom King (Ken Farrington), Matthew always had a much darker side than his brothers.

Matthew first arrived in the village to join his brothers and father. The Kings had won a contract and were celebrating at the time. Matthew's heartless nature was shown when Carl (Tom Lister) was involved in the accidental death of postman Paul Marsden (Matthew Booth). Having moved the body and covered up Carl's involvement, Matthew conned Paul's widow, Siobhan (Abigail Fisher), into selling him the cottage at a knockdown price. She left the area with her unborn baby.

At the funeral of one of Tom's closest friends, Matthew bedded the deceased's daughter before using squeeze Sian to make his next conquest Louise Appleton (Emily Symons) jealous. What Matthew wanted, he got, and it didn't take him long to convince Louise to have an affair with him. However, as soon as Louise left Terry for him, Matthew lost interest. She didn't take it well and one night, in The Woolpack, she warned Jimmy to keep an eye on Sadie. Stunned that Louise had guessed the truth, Matthew began almost stalking Louise to make sure she kept her mouth shut, but she warned him about what happened to men who mistreated her. Louise went home for a holiday as she needed to clear her head. In 2005, Matthew began a relationship with Jimmy's estranged wife, Sadie King (Patsy Kensit). They had dated before, but she chose Jimmy, thinking he would inherit the family business. Their affair brought out Matthew's more vulnerable side. Eventually, he was in a position to take over his father's business empire, but Jimmy revealed the affair with Sadie. Tom made Matthew choose and he chose the business. However, he couldn't live without Sadie and ruined her wedding to Alasdair Sinclair (Ray Coulthard) by declaring his love. Sadie encouraged him to deceive his family to gain a lucrative contract, which made them disown him. After Matthew discovered Sadie was responsible for the show home collapse, he was furious. Furthermore, Matthew discovered that in the wreckage following the disaster, Sadie had hit Jimmy over the head with a brick. Matthew was heartbroken when he realised that Sadie didn't care that a small child had lost his mother and told her that their relationship was over and he never wanted to see her again.

When Tom was murdered on Christmas Day 2006, Matthew suspected his stepmother Rosemary Sinclair (Linda Thorson) of committing the crime. However, there was evidence that the King brothers had killed Tom and they were charged with conspiracy to murder but the trial collapsed due to lack of evidence. Matthew attacked Jimmy, thinking he was responsible and was shocked to discover Carl was responsible and Jimmy knew. Matthew was devastated, but this didn't stop him and his brothers threatening to kill Rosemary if she didn't sign Home Farm Estates over to them. Terrified, Rosemary agreed and moved into Mill Cottage with her son and daughter-in-law.

The most defining relationship Matthew had was with Perdita Hyde-Sinclair (Georgia Slowe). Matthew took a keen interest in Perdita, having had a one-night stand with her. This deepened into friendship and they became close, supporting each other when necessary. He wanted a more intimate relationship, but she stayed with her husband, Grayson Sinclair (Christopher Villiers). Matthew realised Rosemary was responsible for Perdita's troubles after Rosemary drugged her and had her sectioned. He supported Perdita as he felt responsible for Rosemary moving into Mill Cottage and they grew closer. Perdita, however, struggled with her feelings for him as she wanted to make her marriage work, especially after she discovered Katie Sugden (Sammy Winward), now her surrogate, was pregnant. Matthew stunned Perdita by telling her he would wait for her and raise the baby as his own, if it meant he could be with her. Perdita was thrilled and they carried on their affair but Grayson found out and framed Matthew for his mother's "murder". Perdita realised Matthew wasn't guilty when she found evidence and a letter from Rosemary, sent from Miami. Perdita told Grayson that she knew and demanded he clear Matthew's name. She kept the cardigan and used it to blackmail Grayson for sole custody of the baby. She promised, in return, that she wouldn't tell the police that he had helped frame Matthew. She left him on Christmas Day 2007 and moved in with Matthew. However, this only lasted three months as Matthew discovered Perdita had attacked Katie so she almost miscarried and Grayson told him that she knew about the attempt to frame him. Matthew was so horrified that he threw her out and ended their relationship. When she went to see him a few days later, he told her he'd slept with her to upset Grayson.

That summer, Matthew had alienated almost everyone and when Jimmy reminded him about the way he had treated Perdita, Matthew showed signs of remorse. When Perdita's baby son was born (Perdita and Matthew delivered the baby in Matthew's car), Katie told her to take the baby and leave Grayson for ever. In a rare show of kindness, "for old time's sake", Matthew gave Perdita a cheque for £20,000, saying Katie could pay him back once she was out of hospital. Just before Perdita left, they had clearly called a truce and it was noted onscreen that the pair briefly kept in touch when Perdy sent Matthew a letter with a picture of her and the baby. In early 2008, Carl felt increasingly isolated in the King business and family and went to work for their rival, Donald De Souza (Michael Jayston). Matthew was furious, especially when Carl interfered with their efforts to win a lucrative contract. One day during a golf game, Carl taunted Matthew about killing their father so Matthew beat Carl with a golf club. Carl refused to press charges, but wasn't interested when Matthew apologised. Matthew began taking an increasingly cold approach to business, chasing away Zak Dingle (Steve Halliwell), Rodney Blackstock (Patrick Mower) and Jasmine Thomas (Jenna-Louise Coleman) for various reasons. He blackmailed Carl's ex, Lexi Nicholls (Sally Oliver), to get a job at De Souza Enterprises and pass information to him which she did, reluctantly. On learning of Carl's upcoming project, Matthew then created an identical one for King & Sons and invited Carl to the unveiling. A disgusted Jimmy pointed out to Matthew just how many people he had alienated and how lonely he'd become as he was also on the verge of disowning Matthew. Matthew saw the truth in Jimmy's warnings and came to an uneasy truce with Carl.

The love of Matthew's life turned out to be fiery businesswoman, Anna De Souza (Emma Davies), Donald's daughter. Matthew and Anna first met after Carl played a silly trick, leaving her stranded in a company truck on a narrow country lane. Their first reaction was a thorny one, with Matthew annoyed that he nearly crashed into the back of the truck, and Anna warning him to back off. However, the pair bonded over their mutual dislike of Carl and their similar business style. They played Carl at his own game and tricked him into believing that the truck had been impounded due to it being stolen. It soon became clear that she and Carl were attracted to each other, becoming friends and confidants as well as business partners. Matthew was also interested, but Anna initially preferred Carl after they learned to work together. Carl was about to leave Lexi for Anna when Lexi revealed that she knew he had killed Tom, making Carl feel that he had to stay with her. Anna was furious. Matthew tried to kiss Anna after the two closed a successful business deal, but she pushed him away, insisting their relationship could only ever be a business one. Undeterred, Matthew continued to chase Anna despite being knocked back a second time.

Meanwhile, King & Sons was in financial trouble and, taking pity on his brothers, Carl told one of De Souza Enterprise's richest clients about Matthew and Jimmy. When Donald learned of this, he had a heart attack. Matthew attempted to smooth things over between them, suggesting it would be more beneficial for everyone to work together. Donald agreed in Matthew's presence, but later told Anna to use Matthew's feelings for her against him. Incredulous, Anna questioned how far she was supposed to go and Donald told her to go as far as she needed to reel Matthew in so that they could "spit him back out". Unfortunately for Donald, spending so much time with Matthew meant that she and Matthew soon fell in love. Matthew was suspicious of Anna's true motives, but they started a relationship. Unaware, Donald offered Anna's services as a consultant for a business trip to Warsaw, wanting her to use it to gain inside knowledge. He didn't count on Anna returning and admitting her love for his rival, destroying the information she had gathered. With a little persuasion from Katie, Matthew admitted to Anna that he shared her feelings, telling her he loved her more than he imagined possible. The lovers vowed to stick together and start anew, despite the wrath of their families. A few weeks later, Donald confronted Matthew, offering to save King & Sons from financial ruin, providing he ended things with Anna. Matthew refused and Donald warned him there would be consequences. Anna admitted feeding information to Donald, but stopped as soon as she realised her feelings for him. Matthew was furious initially, but believed Anna when she insisted he was more important to her than Donald and proposed to him. He accepted her proposal, but insisted that he should propose and did it the next day with an antique engagement ring, and booked someone to marry them.

Matthew announced the engagement to his brothers and sister while Anna told Donald and made preparations to move into Home Farm. Once again, Donald begged Anna to end her relationship with Matthew, telling her she would be lost to him, but Anna refused to listen. A party was planned at Home Farm to celebrate Anna and Matthew's engagement, a successful deal with Polek Haulage, and an end to the family's financial worries. A furious Donald crashed the party and caused trouble by announcing that Anna was only marrying Matthew to destroy the family from the inside. Matthew angrily retorted that Donald had tried to buy him off and convinced his guests that Donald was lying as he wanted to ruin his and Anna's relationship. Donald then told Anna that he would disinherit her and accused the King brothers of conspiring to murder Tom. Anna reiterated that she chose Matthew and furiously ordered Donald to leave. Pained to see Anna so upset, Matthew tried to calm things by saying that all that mattered now was them and Donald would not split them up because they were too strong. While Anna slept, Matthew planned to confront Donald. A furious argument between them at Holdgate Farm that night ended in tragedy when Donald began having chest pains. Matthew didn't believe he was genuine and withheld his pills, insisting Donald could have them when he agreed to attend the wedding. Making one last plea, Donald fatally collapsed and Matthew, panicked, cleaned the pill bottle and fled. Donald's body was found the next day by Betty Eagleton (Paula Tilbrook) and Laurel Thomas (Charlotte Bellamy), and Anna sobbed in Matthew's arms, thinking Donald had died, believing she hated him. Matthew, consumed by guilt, confessed to Carl who told him that the guilt would eat him alive and begged him to tell Anna. Matthew refused, clearly terrified that he would lose her. Anna, meanwhile, insisted that their wedding plans continue, as the thought of marrying Matthew was the only thing helping her through her grief.

In the run-up to the ill-fated wedding, the Kings lost everything, thanks to their debts. When the lawyers told Carl about Donald's involvement, he believed that Anna would make secret deal to profit from the family's bankruptcy and later suspect Matthew of conspiring with her, as the pair were set to get married together. Just as Matthew and Anna were about to get married, Carl disrupted the ceremony to expose their secret before going on to reveal Matthew's role in Donald's death, prompting a shocked Anna to run away. As Matthew struggled to come to terms of Carl's actions, reminding his younger brother of his relationship with Barraclough, they ended up having a vicious fight after Matthew punched Carl over the latter's constant taunting over Anna; their brawl nearly led to Carl killing Matthew until he backed down, and Matthew disowned Carl after punching him again. Afterwards, Jimmy confronted Matthew and demanded an explanation. Matthew disclosed the events of Donald's death and tried to reassure Jimmy that he never meant to hurt him, but Jimmy was unconvinced and told Matthew that Donald would still be alive if it wasn't for him. Matthew retaliated by recalling how their father would still be alive if it hadn't been for Carl, blaming their younger brother for everything that has happened to them since Tom's death. A vengeful Matthew resorted to get even on Carl and set off to confront him, leading Jimmy to try and restrain him; however, Matthew escaped and took a van to confront Carl, who, in the meantime, was walking up the Home Farm driveway when Anna confronted him over the circumstances behind her father's death. As Anna kept pestering Carl for answers, Matthew appeared and drove straight at Carl in an attempt to kill him, only to end up swerving upon seeing Anna next to him; Matthew barely missed hitting Anna or Carl, but ended up crashing into a wall and was catapulted through the windscreen. Anna rushed over to Matthew as he laid dying, while Jimmy rushed into the scene and called an ambulance using Katie's phone; all the while, a shocked Carl watched on. Unfortunately, it was too late as Matthew succumbed to his injury and died in Anna's arms. Tragically, Carl did not have the chance to make up with Matthew: a sad end to their brotherly bonds.

On the eve of Matthew's death, Carl and Jimmy were kicked out of Home Farm after the bailiffs arrived to reclaim their debts. At Matthew's funeral, Carl gave a eulogy about the kind young man he had been prior to their mother's death. Matthew's friends and family tried to reconcile the two very different sides of the man they'd lost. One of his biggest secrets was revealed after his death when Jimmy and Carl found out what he did to Rosemary's coffin. Matthew would constantly be referenced or mentioned during the subsequent events of the show, including at 2012 when Carl was killed by Cameron Murray (Dominic Power) after the truth about Tom's murder was finally revealed.

== Reception ==
For his portrayal of Matthew, Healy was nominated for several awards at The British Soap Awards. From 2006 to 2009 Healy was nominated for the "Villain of the Year" award at the award ceremony. Also in 2006 he was nominated for the "Sexiest Male" and "Best Actor" awards and his departure in December 2008 was nominated for "Best Exit" at the 2009 awards ceremony. He was also nominated for "Best Bad Boy" at the 2007 Inside Soap Awards.

The character's final scenes were rapped by Ofcom who felt Emmerdale broke watershed guidelines by showing his death in a graphic manner.

== See also ==
- List of soap opera villains
