= Carl King =

Fictional character from Emmerdale

- Emmerdale character
- Portrayed by: Tom Lister
- Duration: 2004–2012
- First appearance: 6 February 2004
- Last appearance: 18 October 2012
- Introduced by: Steve Frost
In-universe information
- Other names: Carl McKenzie (false)
- Occupation: Businessman
- Family: King
- Father: Tom King
- Mother: Mary King
- Stepmother: Rosemary King
- Brothers: Jimmy King; Matthew King; Max King
- Half-sisters: Scarlett Nicholls
- Wife: Colleen King (backstory); Lexi Nicholls (2009)
- Sons: Thomas King
- Daughters: Anya King
- Grandfathers: Albert King
- Nephews: Elliot Windsor; Carl Holliday
- Nieces: Angelica King

Carl Thomas King is a fictional character from the British ITV soap opera Emmerdale, played by Tom Lister. The character and casting were announced in January 2004 when it was announced that producers were bringing "four new single 'hunks'" into the show, one of them being Carl. Lister made his first appearance on the show on 6 February 2004. Throughout the course of his story arc, Carl establishes a relationship with Chas Dingle (Lucy Pargeter) – which contributes to his storylines that include the pair having an ill-fated wedding after Chas exposes Carl's affair with her best friend Eve Jenson (Suzanne Shaw). During his time on the show, Carl has caused the death of local postman Paul Marsden (Matthew Booth); killed his own father Tom (Ken Farrington) in the events surrounding the Who Killed Tom King? storyline, which he ultimately confessed to his brothers Jimmy (Nick Miles) and Matthew (Matt Healy) on the show's 500th village anniversary episode – after the trio were acquitted for their father's murder; formed a romance with DCI Grace Barraclough (Glynis Barber), the policewoman investigating his father's murder, that culminated with her being killed in a hit and run – just as she prepared to take Carl into custody after he admitted to killing his father; sparked a business conflict with Matthew that concluded with the latter's death, after Carl ruined Matthew's ill-fated wedding to his business partner Anna De Souza (Emma Davies) by exposing his involvement behind the death of her father Donald (Michael Jayston); developed a feud with Chas' niece Debbie (Charley Webb) upon clashing with her parents, Cain (Jeff Hordley) and Charity (Emma Atkins), respectively; embarked on a failed marriage with Lexi Nicholls (Sally Oliver); and became archenemies with Debbie's ex-boyfriend Cameron Murray (Dominic Power) after discovering his affair with Chas and subsequently blackmailing the pair in repaying him the £30,000 that Chas previously swindled from his bank account.

After getting jilted by Chas on their ill-fated wedding day at Christmas 2010, Carl became the show's main antagonist upon alienating himself from his family and friends – which ultimately led to the character being killed-off in the show's 40th anniversary episode. This involved Carl fighting with Jimmy over their problematic brotherhood; spoiling Chas' wedding to her fiance Dan Spencer (Liam Fox); and then nearly raping her after she rejects his efforts to recoup their broken relationship, up to the point where he confesses to killing his father for her. The seduction ends with Chas hitting Carl on the head with a brick, though he survives and ends up exposing her affair with Cameron to Debbie – shortly before Carl is then murdered by Cameron after the latter arrives in a failed attempt to stop him from destroying their lives.

== Casting and creation ==
In January 2004, The Sun announced that Emmerdale would bring in "four new single 'hunks'" who are all brothers in an attempt to increase the sex appeal of the serial. They announced that the siblings would arrive in February with Tom Lister having been cast as Carl who would arrive first after securing a job in Tate Haulage.

== Character development ==
=== Characterisation ===
Describing Carl, itv.com said: "Carl is a bit of a womanizer and a ladies' man. As one of the younger King brothers he's always had to fight for his place in the family. He's also commitment phobic, and despite apparently finding his perfect match in Chas, his eyes wandered onto Eve and he wrecked what could have been a beautiful relationship. Carl has a bad temper on him and has been responsible for two accidental deaths – so he's not one to be crossed".

=== Relationship with Chas Dingle ===
"It's one of those things that I think is to do with the chemistry on screen and the fieriness of their relationship. When they are together, it works. The chemistry is great and the passion is obviously there between the two of them. But then they can go to the other extreme when they are screaming at one another and wanting to smack each other's heads in. It's a really turbulent relationship [...] They want them to be together".

— Tom Lister on why Carl and Chas' pairing proved to be popular.

Carl has an on and off relationship with Chas Dingle (Lucy Pargeter). Carl and Chas end their relationship. Lister explained that Carl never stopped loving Chas but the relationship ended when "that door was basically slammed in his face when Chas's son Aaron fell into the mix and gave his mum an ultimatum – him or Carl. So Chas chose her son". Pargeter explained that Chas could not reunite with Carl while Aaron Livesy (Danny Miller) is around due to his ultimatum. Chas begins a relationship with Paddy Kirk (Dominic Brunt). Pargeter said that Chas loves Paddy as a friend and she could not "love anybody the way she loved – or still loves – Carl, really". She added that Chas has "never moved on because there was never closure" in the relationship. Carl begins a relationship with Lexi Nicholls (Sally Oliver). Lister said that Lexi proposes as she knows "there's something there between Carl and Chas and Lexi's envious of that. Obviously Lexi knows that Carl killed his father, but she doesn't know that Chas was the reason. Lexi decides to go all-guns blazing and propose. I think rather than being backed into a corner, part of Carl thinks that if Chas has knocked him back, he'll try and do right by Lexi". Lister told Kris Green of Digital Spy that Carl enters the relationship with the best intentions instead of "wishing he was with Chas all the time" who will always be in the "background". The actor said that viewers would be unsure whether Carl would go through with the wedding to Lexi or whether Carl would instead reunite with Chas. On his wedding day to Lexi, Carl tells Chas that he can not marry Lexi because he still loves her. Pargeter explained that "Chas is completely screwed up by the revelation" and is "desperate to get things back on track with Carl, but she's got Aaron to contend with. So Carl pours his heart out and she has to be as strong as she can". When Chas rejects Carl he marries Lexi but the marriage soon after ends when Carl admits he does not love Lexi.

Carl reunites with Chas but becomes tempted reignite his affair with Eve Jenson (Suzanne Shaw). Lister explained that his character decides to be "sensible" by putting some distance between Eve and himself as he does not want to mess up again after his "disaster" of a marriage to Lexi. He added that Carl is "not tempted enough" to cheat on Chas as he believes she is "the love of his life and he's decided to stay faithful to her – at least for now". Carl and Eve begin an affair; Chas discovers this. Pargeter revealed that Chas' initial reaction is to confront the pair but instead she decides to seek revenge as she is "very hurt". Chas begins her revenge by doing "little things" but later decides to "up her game and to start playing really dirty". Chas proposes to Carl as part of her plan, Pargeter said Chas "can't help wishing it was all for real". She added that it is important to Chas that Carl and Eve get their comeuppance. Pargeter said that Chas can not decide whether she will go through with her revenge or if she would instead forgive Carl and marry him. She added that Chas "genuinely thinks he loves her" and she loves him too. Chas lies she is pregnant. Lister said that Carl will be "gutted" if Chas goes through with her revenge plan. He explained that Carl was "thrilled" at Chas' pregnancy and he now wants to "give Chas whatever she wants – a big Christmas day wedding, anything to make her happy". Carl "wants to become a proper family with Chas and the baby. He'll be devastated if it all comes crashing down". He "realises his fling with Eve was a massive mistake, based on excitement and lust". Lister added that Carl felt Chas' proposal and pregnancy were "a great excuse to get out of the affair with Eve because it was all getting a little bit complicated", explaining that Eve "was becoming too much hard work".

Lister explained the couple's relationship saying: "there's something about those two – they are an absolute nightmare when they are together because they either fall out or one of them does something that jeopardises the relationship. But they always keep coming together, back to one another. They are destined to be together". Chas plans to expose Carl's affair on their wedding day, Lister explained that Chas begins "losing confidence in the whole revenge plan because she realises how much she would actually love to marry him and would love to have a family with him". He added that Carl and Chas have always wanted to marry and begin a family but they have never been able to "get their act together and decide to do it". Lister told Ryan Love of Digital Spy that Chas begins to doubt whether she will go through with exposing Carl's affair after she sees how serious Carl is about their relationship and that he has ended his affair with Eve. Lister said that if Chas goes through with her plan then Carl will be in disbelief that Chas "could do something like this – that she could pretend that she was pregnant, that she could do all this stuff basically just to bleed him dry of all the money. [...] For her to take him to the cleaners, I think he would be so gutted and completely ashamed for it to be revealed like that in front of everybody". Lister added that Carl could forgive Chas if she was honest about her plot before the wedding. Lister went on to say that Carl has "always seen Chas as the answer to all of his problems. She was like the one who he could get his life sorted with".

=== Departure and death ===
In October 2012, as part of the show's 40th anniversary celebrations, Carl was murdered by love rival Cameron Murray. His last words were "I'm indestructible." His body was found the next morning.

== Storylines ==
Carl is the first member of the King family to arrive in Emmerdale as the new driver for Tate Haulage. However, no one knows that he is a spy, reporting back to his family business, King & Sons. Carl learns what Tate Haulage plan to bid for a new contract and, with this information, his family revise their bid and win the contract.

Despite being married, Carl flirts with Louise Appleton (Emily Symons) and she agrees to a date until Carl's wife, Colleen (Melanie Ash), arrives and tells Louise that she is Carl's wife and mother of his children; Thomas (Mark Flanagan) and Anya (Lauren Sheriston) before telling Carl not to come home. Louise slaps Carl and goes home so he moves into Holdgate Farm with his family but is "persuaded" to do some repairs to the roof, despite his fear of heights. Local postman, Paul Marsden (Matthew Booth) helps him and seeing his nerves about heights, starts teasing him and mucking about but stretches too far and falls, dying instantly. Not wanting people to know they were involved, Carl and his brothers, Jimmy (Nick Miles) and Matthew (Matt Healy), move his body to the back garden of the cottage Paul shared with his wife, Siobhan (Abigail Fisher). She finds him and assumes he fell from their roof after fixing the television aerial.

Meanwhile, Carl bonds with Chas Dingle (Lucy Pargeter) over feeling like they're bad parents for abandoning their children and tells her about Paul's death. They start dating but the relationship is rocky and during one break, Carl has a one-night stand with Chloe Atkinson (Amy Nuttall). When she finds out Carl and Chas are back together, she decides to split them up permanently. She starts a campaign of poison pen letters and undermines Chas's trust in Carl, succeeding in her aim so he reconciles with Chloe but soon tires of her and tries to end it. Not wanting to let him go, she tells him she's pregnant, despite the fact that she isn't and starts trying to get pregnant before Carl discovers the truth. Chas discovers Chloe's lie and forces her to tell Carl the truth, that she isn't pregnant and never was. Before leaving the village, she reminds Carl that she could be pregnant as they weren't taking precautions. Horrified at his mistake, Carl tries to reconcile with Chas but she is not interested and leaves to join the army so Carl starts dating her cousin, Del Dingle (Hayley Tamaddon). Realising that Carl wanted Chas, not her, Del encourages him to fight for Chas so he tracks her down and declares his feelings, accidentally dropping her after picking her up and breaking her leg. Consequently, Chas is discharged on medical grounds and reconciles with Carl and he proposes marriage but Chas refuses, until he does a wing walk to conquer his acrophobia. They move into Home Farm with his father Tom (Ken Farrington) and Chas becomes Jimmy's personal assistant.

Tensions erupt when Matthew and Jimmy's ex-wife, Sadie King (Patsy Kensit), declare their feelings for each other, move into Victoria Cottage and start a rival company. Matthew uses Carl to pass Jimmy false information so he loses an important deal while Tom and his fiancée, Rosemary Sinclair (Linda Thorson), insist that Chas is not good enough for Carl and on learning that Chas has been giving information about the Kings to Jamie Hope (Alex Carter), whose sister died in the King's River Showhome disaster, Tom bullies and bribes Chas to end things with Carl. Chas, however, encouraged by her cousin, Eli Dingle (Joseph Gilgun), tells Carl the truth on Tom and Rosemary's wedding day. Later that day, Tom dies after falling from his bedroom window, and his sons are the primary suspects.

The brothers are stunned to learn that they have a half-sister, Scarlett (Kelsey-Beth Crossley), daughter of their mother's nurse, Carrie Nicholls (Linda Lusardi). Carl struggles to bond with her and he and Matthew try to buy her share of the business. Carl eventually softens but is uncomfortable around Carrie, as they had a brief relationship when he was a teenager but is grateful when Carrie helps evict Rosemary from Home Farm. Hari Prasad (John Nayagam) tells the police that he heard the King brothers discussing how they murdered Tom and Louise, his girlfriend, backs him up but the case collapses when Louise admits giving a false statement. After the acquittal, Carl admits to Jimmy and Matthew that he killed Tom. He reveals that he confronted Tom about Chas, hitting him when Tom called Chas names and then pushed him away, causing Tom to fall out of the window. Carl begins dating DCI Grace Barraclough (Glynis Barber) in secret, unaware of her plan to learn who killed Tom, but Carl won't say. Grace ends their relationship and Carl gets drunk, telling Jimmy and Matthew about the relationship so Jimmy takes Carl abroad to clear his head. However, on his return, Carl deliberately gets arrested for drink driving so he can see Grace and tells her that he killed Tom and decides to confess. Jimmy watches as Carl and Grace go to the police station and as Carl stops to answer his phone, Grace carries on and is hit by a lorry. Grace dies and despite telling the police that he is a killer, the police ignore him as they are more concerned about Grace.

Carrie's daughter, Lexi (Sally Oliver), visits her sister and becomes involved with Carl. He joins De Souza Enterprises, angering Matthew. Donald De Souza (Michael Jayston) appoints Carl MD of his business, disappointing his daughter, Anna (Emma Davies). Carl hires Lexi to be his PA, but discovers she has been passing information to Matthew, and ends things with her. Carl and Anna are attracted to each other and he is jealous of her relationship with Matthew and reconciles with Lexi, but when he tries to end their relationship, Lexi tells him that Carrie told her that he killed Tom. Donald buys Mill Cottage for Carl and he and Lexi move in together. However, on learning that Carl sent an important client to his brothers, Donald terminates Carl's contract and Carl returns to work with his brothers. Carl is saddened when he hears that Donald has died and Matthew admits causing his death by refusing to give him his heart medication. Knowing the guilt Matthew will live with, urges him to tell Anna but he refuses. When King & Sons is declared bankrupt and the bailiffs move in on Matthew and Anna's ill fated-wedding day, Carl is furious to learn that De Souza Enterprises wrecked King & Sons's chances of survival and that Matthew will have an interest in the company as he is married to Anna, Carl blames Matthew for everything and reveals the truth about Donald's death at the wedding. This leads to a fight between him and Carl and Matthew drives a van at him. However, on seeing Anna standing with Carl, he swerves and is thrown through the windscreen, dying on the road.

Carl realises his only assets are Mill Cottage and a mortgage he gave Debbie Dingle (Charley Webb) and begins pressuring her for money. Carl, Jimmy, Lexi and Scarlett scrape together enough money to start a new haulage company. Carl tells Chas that he still loves her, but she insists they are history. Lexi proposes to Carl and he accepts, she sets a date but Carl goes missing on the day. He meets Chas and she insists she has moved on so he marries Lexi but is furious when he learns she has stopped taking precautions without consulting him. He reluctantly agrees to have a baby and Lexi gets pregnant but miscarries almost immediately as the pregnancy is ectopic. Tests done just after the miscarriage show that Lexi is unlikely to conceive again without IVF and Carl agrees to try IVF initially but soon changes his mind. Nicola De Souza (Nicola Wheeler) insists that Carl tell Lexi, which he does, and they argue. She also argues with Nicola and Nicola goes into premature labour after falling down the stairs. Lexi apologises and Nicola forgives her. Later, after a nurse gives baby Angelica to Lexi while Nicola is in the shower, she takes her up on to the roof, simply wanting to show her the world. However, seeing Lexi sitting on the roof with baby Angelica makes Jimmy, Nicola and Carl panic that she is going to jump. Carl talks her down and she returns baby Angelica to Nicola and Jimmy after Carl admits that he doesn't love Lexi and wouldn't have married her if she hadn't known that he killed Tom. Lexi tells Carl that she is leaving him and joins Carrie in Canada as Lexi herself divorces from Carl off-screen.

Nicola insists Carl move out of Mill Cottage and he reconciles with Chas again after telling her partner, Paddy Kirk (Dominic Brunt), about their affair. They are happy together for a while but, now getting bored, Carl begins an affair with Eve Jenson (Suzanne Shaw). Chas proposes to him and implies she is pregnant. Carl accepts and gives her money for the wedding and ends things with Eve but on the day, Chas reveals Carl's affair with Eve to the village and jilts him. Carl becomes bitter towards Chas for stealing his money and is accused of starting a fire near her house, which engulfs the village and kills Terry Woods (Billy Hartman) and Viv Hope (Deena Payne). Carl is arrested but later freed. He and Chas have a one-night stand months later and he comforts her when her son, Aaron Livesy (Danny Miller), is charged with murder. Carl borrows money from Scarlett to hire a lawyer for Aaron but when Aaron refuses to take it, invests it in his business instead. Disgusted, Scarlett discovers what he has done and leaves the village.

Carl is caught speeding on CCTV and he convinces Rodney Blackstock (Patrick Mower) to take his speeding points for him, in exchange for a job. The police reveal that a cyclist was hit during the incident and Carl is shocked when he learns Rodney could go to prison. Rodney blackmails him into giving him money and a job. Jimmy discovers what is happening and confronts Carl.

Carl discovers Chas has been having an affair with Cameron Murray (Dominic Power) and begins blackmailing them for the £30,000 that Chas took from him. Carl slowly becomes obsessed with getting Chas back and starts pushing everyone away, including Jimmy. Carl asks Chas to run away with him and she agrees, wanting to keep him sweet. However, on her wedding day, Carl has a fight with Jimmy. However, after she marries Dan Spencer (Liam Fox), Carl realises that she has no intention of being with him. He corners Chas and confesses that he killed his father for her. Chas is disgusted and tries to flee. However, he pushes her down and attempts to rape her. In self-defence, Chas hits him over the head with a brick. She flees the scene. Later, Cameron turns up. They argue and Cameron hits Carl with a brick, killing him. His last words were "I'm indestructible." His body is found the following morning by Adam Barton (Adam Thomas) and Victoria Sugden (Isabel Hodgins).

== Reception ==
At the 2007 Inside Soap Awards Lister was nominated for the "Sexiest Male" award for his portrayal of Carl. The same year, at the British Soap Awards, the "Who killed Tom King?" storyline was nominated for "Best Storyline". At the 2008 Digital Spy Soap Awards Lister was nominated in the "Most Popular Actor" category. He was later nominated in the "Sexiest Male" category at the British Soap Awards in 2009. In 2012, Lister was nominated for the "Best Bad Boy" Award at the Inside Soap Awards and for "Villain of the Year" at the British Soap Awards. and the awards has praised Lister's character Carl, as one of the all-time great, completely horrific soap monsters. On Digital Spy's 2012 end of year reader poll, Lister was nominated for "Best Male Soap Actor" and came fifth with 7.0% of the vote.

The Guardian's Grace Dent commented that "Carl King is powerless when presented with sexy golddiggers like Eve. Carl absolutely cannot and will not stop marrying these awful women until he's living in the back of a Land Rover heating up Heinz London Grill with a lighter his wife's lawyer owns half of. A fool and his underpants are easily parted." Carl's death episode boosted the serial's viewing figures and helped secure the highest viewing figures of the year. Regarding Carl's exit, David Brown of Radio Times stated that the episode "Tom Lister, who's played Carl since 2004, gave a barnstorming valedictory performance: in a show once described by Les Dawson as "Dallas with dung", he really was a bucolic J. R. Ewing [...] But as Carl lay lifeless on the floor in those dying seconds, it really did feel like the end of an era. New babies – even when they have prophetic names like Jack Sugden – are ten-a-penny on soaps. But decent villains are priceless: at the moment, it’s hard to see who deserves to inherit the mighty Carl King’s crown".

== See also ==
- List of soap opera villains
