= Anna De Souza =

Fictional character from Emmerdale

- Emmerdale character
- Portrayed by: Emma Davies
- Duration: 2008–2009
- First appearance: 8 July 2008
- Last appearance: 6 January 2009
- Created by: Anita Turner
In-universe information
- Occupation: Businesswoman
- Father: Donald De Souza
- Mother: Christine De Souza
- Stepmother: Nicola King
- Brothers: Miles De Souza
- Husband: Mark (backstory)

Anna De Souza is a fictional character from the ITV soap opera Emmerdale, played by Emma Davies. She made her first appearance on 8 July 2008 and left on 6 January 2009.

== Character creation and development ==
Anna De Souza's arrival was announced in June 2008. Emmerdale producer Anita Turner said, "Anna is a really interesting character. She seeks her father’s approval but everyone else must dance to her tune. Anna sees opportunities and goes for them. The King Brothers won't know what's hit them!" and "She's very much harping back to the history of the show... she has hidden depths – it's all about the complexities."

Actress Emma Davies described Anna as an "extremely fun and confident woman" who also has a "vulnerability", and due to her love for the country, is "more Kim Tate than Sadie King." In spite of the "superbitch" tag, Davies said Anna was "not a snob" and "not an obvious bitch."

In October 2008, Anita Turner announced that Emma Davies would be leaving around the end of 2008, saying, "Emma is a hugely talented actress but Anna's story always dictated a beginning, a middle and an end and that will culminate in dramatic scenes in December, which are being filmed at the moment."

Davies said,

"The opportunity of playing Anna has been a joy from start to finish. I've enjoyed being part of such a fantastic, hard-working and super talented team. I've made some great friends who I will of course miss very much but I'm excited about getting stuck into filming the culmination of Anna's story."

== Storylines ==
Anna was extremely close to her father, Donald De Souza (Michael Jayston), while growing up, and helped him build his fortune. When she met Mark, Donald dismissed him as a fortune hunter, but Anna refused to end it. When she married Mark, Donald cut her out of his will and cut off all contact. She ran her own company in Dubai. Within six years, Mark had spent all Anna's money and was cheating on her. The marriage was over.

Anna was in touch with her brother, Miles (Ayden Callaghan). He told her about Donald's illness and she realised she had to see him. Anna arrived during Donald's 73rd birthday party. She went to Holdgate Farm, looking for him and met Carl King (Tom Lister). Carl thought Anna was looking for a job and Anna didn't disillusion him. He told her about her father's birthday party at Home Farm and she went there to see him. At Home Farm, she and Carl bet their cars for whoever hit both targets in skeet shooting. Anna easily hit both targets but told Carl he could keep his car, as she didn't like it very much. After telling her father about the changes in her life, she said she couldn't let him be swayed by Carl the way she'd been swayed by Mark, and to remember Carl's family were their main rivals. Donald listened to her but made Carl Managing Director, telling Anna she had a lot to prove. Anna had no intention of giving up without a fight. She moved in with her father, ostensibly to help her brother, and soon began to clash with Carl.

A few weeks after her return, Anna hired Miles's ex-girlfriend Jasmine Thomas (Jenna-Louise Coleman) to work on their website revamp as well as running errands. Unfortunately, her matchmaking efforts backfired when Jasmine's new boyfriend Jake Doland (James Baxter) laughed at Miles for being so desperate to hire Jasmine to spend time with him. Miles was humiliated by his sister's interference and left town. Anna and Carl's rivalry continued to rage, with them constantly trying to trick and undermine the other. However, it soon became clear that there was a mutual attraction, although neither would admit it.

Things came to a head when Carl, sick of Anna undermining him, played a trick on her to get her back. Anna had been claiming that she wanted to learn De Souza Enterprises from the ground up so Carl let her take a company truck for a test drive. He didn't tell her that the fuel tank was only half full and she was soon stranded when the truck broke down on a country lane in the middle of nowhere. Matthew King (Matt Healy), Carl's older brother, came to her rescue and was amused by her description of Carl. Anna and Matthew became good friends, sharing a mutual distrust of Carl and an ambitious way of conducting business. Carl was jealous of Matthew and Anna's relationship, and decided to get back with ex-girlfriend, Lexi Nicholls (Sally Oliver) to make her jealous. Much to Carl's disappointment, Anna was amused and swiftly began teasing him about his feelings for her. Anna soon had to choose between Carl and Matthew as her relationships with both progressed. It was unclear if Anna was genuinely interested in either, or was playing them off against each other for her own reasons and amusement.

Carl and Anna's frosty partnership came to a sharp end after she had a vicious fight with Donald, and Carl comforted her. The pair saw each other in a different light, and Carl kissed her, seemingly to her surprise. After some initial confusion, she told him she would like a relationship with him but first Carl would have to dump Lexi. However, when Carl tried to end things with her, Lexi revealed she knew he had killed his father, Tom King (Ken Farrington), forcing Carl to stay with her so that she would not tell anyone. Anna was furious and told Carl that he would be sorry for making her look like a fool.

Meanwhile, Matthew also tried to kiss Anna after they closed a successful business deal. However, she pulled away. She admitted that she wanted him but told him they could only have a business relationship, unaware that Carl had not dumped Lexi. Matthew asked if he was supposed to hide his feelings for her, and she replied he would have to if he wanted their current relationship to continue. Undeterred, Matthew continued to chase Anna, despite being turned down a second time. Anna and Carl's rivalry was back, and nastier than ever, with them soon getting into a bidding war for Mill Cottage. Annoyed, Carl complained to Donald, who was incensed to discover Anna was out with Matthew, who he felt was a troublemaker and unsuitable for his daughter. In retaliation, Donald offered to buy Mill Cottage for Carl and Lexi.

Later, Anna guessed that Carl had betrayed De Souza Enterprises by sending a rich client to King and Sons. Disappointed, Donald bought Carl out and he returned to King & Sons. Donald suffered a heart attack due to the stress and another argument with Anna. However, during his recovery in hospital, he and Anna made up, and Donald told Anna that he wanted to sign De Souza Enterprises over to her, even calling his Solicitor to bring the contract to the hospital. Much to his surprise, Anna tore the contract up and stated her intention to prove herself before taking ownership of the company. Reunited, Donald and Anna began to plot their revenge against the Kings.

Matthew visited Donald in hospital (after sending Carl on a business trip to Brussels) attempting to clear the air between them, saying they had more to gain by working together than against each other. He also told Anna that he didn't want there to be any bad feeling between them. Donald agreed to discuss Matthew's proposal with Anna but after Matthew left, Donald told Anna she should use Matthew's feelings for her against him. Anna, at first, seemed shocked at his suggestion, asking her father how far she was supposed to go, and showing confusion about the route that their plan for revenge was taking. However, desperate to impress, Anna arranged to meet Matthew, who soon insisted that he take her to dinner, kicking Donald and Anna's plan into action.

Anna and Matthew continued spending time together, and she soon had trouble with her feelings for him. Matthew was particularly touched when Anna got him a new watch after his old one was ruined and retrieved the engraving from the old one, as he explained that his father had given him the watch on his 21st birthday and it held a lot of sentimental value. No longer able to deny the chemistry between them, the pair finally slept together, and proceeded to start a secret relationship. Donald, unknowingly, offered Anna's services on a business trip to Warsaw, as a Consultant, thinking Anna could get some valuable inside information about King & Sons for their revenge plan. What he didn't expect was Anna admitting to him that she had fallen in love with Matthew. A furious Donald shunned Anna, telling her he'd ruin the Kings with or without her help, and kept information that she thought she had destroyed. Matthew told Anna that he returned her feelings, telling her he loved her more than he imagined possible, and they agreed to start again. When Matthew returned to Warsaw to complete the business deal, Donald begged Anna to end her relationship with him and threatened to tell Matthew the reason why Anna got close to him in the first place.

When Matthew returned, Anna knew she had to confess before Donald told Matthew. Angry, Matthew initially dumped her but listened when she insisted she would turn her back on Donald, and asked him to marry her. He happily accepted, and the news was broken to Donald, Carl and Jimmy King (Nick Miles). The next day, Matthew proposed to Anna with an antique engagement ring as she moved her belongings to Home Farm. A party was planned, to celebrate both the engagement, and the successful deal with Polek Haulage. Donald crashed the party, announcing to everyone that Anna was only marrying Matthew to ruin the Kings from the inside. Matthew angrily retorted that Donald had tried to buy him off, and convinced his brothers that Donald was lying. Donald threatened Anna that he would disinherit her if she didn't break off the engagement, and she furiously insisted that she choose Matthew, and ordered him to leave. Hating to see his fiancée so upset, Matthew told Anna that the only thing that mattered was them, and planned to confront Donald alone.

Matthew's visit to Donald did not end well, as Donald had a heart attack after Matthew confronted him at Holdgate Farm. Donald began to suffer chest pains but Matthew, thinking he was making it up, refused to give him his medication until he agreed to attend the wedding. Donald made a final plea, and fell to the floor, dead. Matthew, panicked, fled the scene and Donald's body was found the next day by cleaners Betty Eagleton (Paula Tilbrook) and Laurel Thomas (Charlotte Bellamy), who contacted Anna and the authorities.

Devastated, Anna believed her father had died, thinking that she hated him. Katie Sugden (Sammy Winward) comforted Anna and told her about the similar circumstances of her father's death. Meanwhile, Matthew confessed to Carl that he was involved in Donald's death. Disgusted that Matthew could keep this from Anna, Carl warned Matthew that the guilt would eat him alive, if he didn't tell Anna. Matthew explained that he was terrified of losing her, and couldn't tell her. Meanwhile, whilst planning her father's funeral, Anna insisted that they continue planning their ill-fated wedding, as the thought of marrying him was helping her through her grief.

After Donald's death, Anna began helping King & Sons financially, as she loved Matthew and felt some remorse that she had helped to lure their biggest client away. By the day of the ill-fated wedding, a creditor had got a court order dissolving King & Sons and the bailiffs had arrived at Home Farm. Anna gave the bailiffs her car if they would give them 24 hours. The bailiffs agreed. Carl went to see the lawyer, and began believing that Anna and Matthew were working together. He ruined the ill-fated wedding by revealing Matthew's role in Donald's death. Devastated, Anna left and Matthew and Carl had a fight. Matthew got into a van and tried to run Carl down. Meanwhile, Katie had gone after Anna and was trying to persuade her to return to the ill-fated-wedding. Anna saw Carl, and demanded answers about her father's death. Matthew was driving towards Carl, but at the last minute, saw Anna was with Carl and swerved to avoid her, crashing into a wall and was catapulted through the windscreen. Despite Jimmy calling an ambulance Matthew died in Anna's arms.

The next morning she told Katie she'd come to Emmerdale to mend fences with her father, and instead she'd lost her father. She asked Jimmy and Carl about Matthew and her father's death. An embittered Carl let her believe the worst, but Jimmy told her that Matthew had never meant for Donald to die. Anna left town for two weeks to track down her brother, Miles, and the Kings agreed not to hold the funeral until her return. The Kings heard nothing from Anna during her absence, and finally decided to hold the funeral. Anna returned halfway through the service. A drunken Jimmy lambasted her, but Carl eulogized that Anna had been the first person Matthew had been able to express his love for since their mother's death. At the wake, finding closure in their tense relationship, they hugged goodbye.

After the wake, Anna told Katie the company she'd worked for before moving to Emmerdale had asked her to rejoin them. She had an emotional farewell with Katie, thanking Katie for being one of the only people in town who hadn't judged her. As Anna drove away, she saw a distraught Jimmy trying to finish burying Matthew. Her eyes filling with tears, she stopped for a moment but continued on. The last shot was of the flowers Anna had put at Matthew's grave.
