= Jimmy King (Emmerdale) =

Fictional character from Emmerdale

- Emmerdale character
- Portrayed by: Nick Miles
- Duration: 2004–2026
- First appearance: Episode 3666; 19 February 2004
- Last appearance: Episode 10650; 3 September 2026
- Created by: Steve Frost
- Introduced by: Keith Richardson
- Spin-off appearances: Emmerdale: The Dingles, For Richer for Poorer (2010)
In-universe information
- Occupation: Businessperson; Truck driver; Bartender; Pub landlord
- Father: Tom King
- Mother: Mary King
- Stepmother: Rosemary King
- Brothers: Matthew King; Carl King; Max King
- Half-sisters: Scarlett Nicholls
- Wife: Sadie King (1990–2005); Nicola Blackstock (2010–2026)
- Sons: Elliot Windsor; Carl Holliday
- Daughters: Angelica King
- Grandfathers: Albert King
- Nephews: Thomas King
- Nieces: Anya King
- Other relatives: Phyllis King

Jimmy King is a fictional character from the British ITV soap opera Emmerdale, portrayed by Nick Miles. He made his first appearance on 19 February 2004, and departed on 27 August 2026.

The character was introduced as a member of the newly-established King Family alongside his father Tom King (Ken Farrington) and his threw younger brothers: Matthew (Matt Healy), Carl (Tom Lister), and Max (Charlie Kemp) respectively. Over the years Jimmy has evolved from a callous businessman to a devoted husband and even a comical relief as well on certain occasions. This personality transformation followed the deaths of all his brothers on different occasions, the murder of his father on Christmas Day 2006, the introduction of his long-lost sister Scarlett Nicholls (Kelsey-Beth Crossley), and his beloved marriage with Nicola Blackstock (Nicola Wheeler) since 2010.

Jimmy's storylines have included his various family business dealings, a feud with the Sugden family, being stabbed by Daz Eden (Luke Tittensor) following an arson attack which he started, the breakdown of his estranged marriage to Sadie King (Patsy Kensit), his marriage to Nicola, becoming a father in later life, suffering from amnesia following a blow to the head by his ex-fiance Kelly Windsor (Adele Silva) coping with money troubles, discovering he had a son following sperm donation, and finding out that his nephew Thomas King (James Chase) had been abusing the latter's wife Belle Dingle (Eden Taylor-Draper) for months.

Ultimately, it was reported on 17 May 2026 that Miles had been axed from the role after 22 years. The character was killed-off after crashing his car into a marquee celebrating the wedding of Joe Tate and Dawn Fletcher.

== Development ==
=== Amnesia storyline ===
In January 2011 it was announced that Jimmy King is to lose his memory after being brutally attacked by Kelly Windsor (Adele Silva). Jimmy played by Nick Miles will stun doting wife Nicola (Nicola Wheeler) when he wakes up in hospital unable to recognise both her and their young daughter Angelica.

Nicola Wheeler explained: "At the hospital, Nicola rushes in and gives Jimmy a hug – but he doesn't recognise her at all. She thinks he must remember their daughter, Angelica, because she's part of him. But when Nicola shows Jimmy a picture of her, all he can say is that he thinks she's a pretty little girl. With everyone unaware as to how the attack happened, doctors tell Nicola that Jimmy has totally lost his memory of life up to and including the accident, leaving the young mum horrified at the prospect of life with a man who has no idea who she is."

=== Departure ===
On 17 May 2026 it was reported that Miles had been axed from the show and will depart in late 2026 after 22 years in the role, when his character Jimmy King will be killed off in a big storyline that will bring Sadie King back to the village. The scenes are yet to be filmed but will air across the autumn. Metro had been aware of the major twist but had chosen to withhold the spoiler. A source told Metro recently: ‘The scenes promise to be spectacular but the outcome will leave many fans shocked. ‘It may prove controversial but the jaw-dropping storyline will set in motion some massive consequences for many months to follow.’ On 27 August 2026, Jimmy was killed off following a car crash on Joe Tate and Dawn Fletcher’s wedding day.

== Storylines ==
=== Backstory ===
Born when his father Tom (Ken Farrington) was building up his empire, Jimmy didn't have the same privileges as his brothers – and it shows. He began working for his father at fifteen, after Tom bought his boss's failing factory. Charles Maguire was a thorn between Jimmy and Tom for some time, as an idealistic Jimmy disputed his father's business tactics.

=== 2004–2026 ===
For many years, Jimmy was an awkward, dippy man, stumbling through business and a disastrous marriage. The closest enemy he had, apart from himself, was his brother Matthew (Matt Healy), who coveted and eventually won Jimmy's place in the family business and Sadie King's (Patsy Kensit) bed. As time passed, Jimmy and Matthew became closer and Jimmy found love with Kelly Windsor (Adele Silva). Kelly, along with the arrival of their half-sister, Scarlett Nicholls (Kelsey-Beth Crossley), made him a more caring individual.

Jimmy and Sadie's marriage seemed perfect. She was a stunning blonde, determined to see him succeed. Sadly, she disagreed on one issue – he was desperate to be a dad but Sadie had no intention of getting pregnant. When Jimmy found out, he was horrified. Worried about his marriage, Sadie changed her mind but her determination to get rid of Charity Dingle (Emma Atkins) ended their marriage for good. Sick of being made a fool of by Sadie and his family, Jimmy fell into Charity's trap. Sadie had told Tom that Charity was cheating on him so she got revenge and cleared her name by sleeping with Jimmy and videotaped him telling her about Sadie's lies. She demanded Jimmy pay her £200,000 not to show the tape to Tom and he did but she played the tape regardless. The results were catastrophic. Sadie dumped Jimmy and Tom disowned him so he joined forces with a rival businessman – but this didn't last. Tom soon forgave him and welcomed him back into the fold.

Relations between Jimmy and Sadie, however, descended into war and Jimmy hid his assets so Sadie's settlement was reduced. Angry, she bought land that Tom needed to get back into King & Sons. Jimmy was horrified and made it clear that their marriage was over, moving on with Kelly. They enjoyed a brief romance but Sadie ruined it by telling Jimmy about Kelly's career as a glamour model. Horrified, he dumped Kelly and started flirting with The Woolpack barmaid, Toni Daggert (Kerry Stacey), who hoped to become his PA, but Paddy ruined that so he concentrated on the business. Jimmy wanted to make Tom proud after Matthew walked out, leaving Jimmy in charge of King & Sons. Matthew and Sadie, however, plotted to ruin Jimmy and their scheming cost him a deal with Don Clough. Furious, he threw himself into launching the Kings River development but Matthew and Sadie paid Cain Dingle (Jeff Hordley) to damage the showhome, which he did. Jimmy had the damage assessed but wanting to open the show home on time, he had the damage patched up and planned to get it repaired properly later. Sadly no one noticed that the gas pipes had been damaged and the house exploded at the opening, killing three people and injuring others, including Jimmy. His injuries were serious enough for him to go to a convalescent home briefly and on his return, he found Tom was dating Rosemary Sinclair (Linda Thorson). He and his brothers tried to tell Tom that she was a nasty piece of work but he wouldn't listen. Their wedding was planned for Christmas Day and Tom gave Rosemary Home Farm Estates as a wedding present but the day ended tragically when Tom fell from his bedroom window. Jimmy and his brothers were suspected of Tom's murder and were suspicious of each other. The lack of evidence ensured that Tom's killer was never found but Rosemary knew one of her stepsons was responsible. Matthew and Jimmy were horrified when their brother Carl (Tom Lister) admitted he was responsible, damaging family relations but at the reading of Tom's will, they were shocked to find out about Tom's affair with Carrie Nicholls (Linda Lusardi) and their half-sister, Scarlett. Matthew wanted to buy her share of the family firm and Carl ignored them. Family man Jimmy embraced his new sister, becoming a surrogate father in Tom's place.

Jimmy and Kelly reconciled just before Christmas. Kelly had told her family she planned to bleed Jimmy dry in revenge for Dawn Woods' (Julia Mallam) death but didn't as she fell in love with him. After dumping her when he discovered her plan, Jimmy realised Kelly really did love him and they reconciled. She supported him after Tom died, even giving him an alibi and they got engaged. While planning their wedding, Kelly discovered that she was pregnant. Initially she seemed happy and asked her agent if her career would be affected by her taking a year off but her agent told her that her career would be over if she had a baby so she had an abortion, thinking she and Jimmy could have children later. Scarlett went with Kelly but had to tell Carrie when a leaflet from the clinic was found in her coat pocket. Carrie confronted Kelly about it but agreed not to tell Jimmy, providing Kelly stayed away from Scarlett. On 9 October 2007 – Jimmy and Kelly's wedding day – Jimmy jilted Kelly after Eli Dingle (Joe Gilgun) told Jimmy that they had kissed and she had had an abortion. Disgusted, Jimmy couldn't forgive her so Kelly left Jimmy a letter, telling him she would be staying at a local hotel if he wanted to talk but Carrie destroyed it and Kelly left. As Carrie had pursued him while he was engaged to Kelly, Jimmy gave in and they had a brief affair. However, things went sour when Carrie told Jimmy she loved him and he couldn't say the same, making her realise that Jimmy had slept with her on the rebound and emigrated to Canada with an old flame.

However, financial problems built up and in December 2008, King & Sons were declared bankrupt and were evicted from Home Farm, thanks to Donald De Souza (Michael Jayston). On Matthew and Anna De Souza's (Emma Davies) ill-fated wedding day, Carl learnt what Donald had done and that Anna had an interest in De Souza Enterprises, meaning Matthew would benefit as her husband. Feeling that Matthew had stitched his brothers up, he stopped the wedding. Consequently, he and Matthew had a massive fight, ending in Matthew's death. Jimmy was devastated but Carl was too embittered and stunned to help so Jimmy turned to drink and was drunk at Matthew's funeral. When he learned that Tom's and Rosemary's grave had been defaced, he verbally attacked the congregation before Scarlett dragged him out. That night, Jimmy saw Matthew's grave hadn't been filled in so, weeping, he did it. The next morning, Carl found him passed out next to the grave. The next day, Katie Sugden (Sammy Winward) told Jimmy that Rodney Blackstock (Patrick Mower) and Jamie Hope (Alex Carter) had arranged a shoot on Home Farm. Jimmy and a guest named Richard, realised Rodney was sleeping with his wife and meaning to shoot Rodney, accidentally shot Jimmy. Fortunately, he wasn't seriously injured but this snapped him out of his grief. He and Carl began working together to restart the business and got a large settlement from Richard in exchange for not going to the police.

In February 2009, Jimmy and Nicola De Souza (Nicola Wheeler) drowned their sorrows together and ended up in the back of an Emmerdale Haulage van, waking up the next morning naked and on their way to Hull. Nicola was horrified; Jimmy was amused. Nicola felt she was too good for Jimmy and refused to consider a relationship. A few weeks later, she asked him to go with her to Home Farm but Jimmy was uncomfortable and got drunk before spending the night with Nicola again. She dumped him again but when Rodney suggested Jimmy might have some money in Switzerland (where he was going on a business trip), Nicola was suddenly interested. Carl told Jimmy that Nicola was only interested in his money and when Nicola proved Carl right, Jimmy humiliated her by wining and dining her before telling everyone that she was a gold digger and left her at the roadside. Sandy Thomas (Freddie Jones) and Douglas Potts (Duncan Preston), who lived with Nicola, grew so tired of her that they wrote love letters in Jimmy's name, asking her to move in with him. Nicola jumped at the chance of living with him and Jimmy was thrilled. He was shocked to hear about the letters but kept quiet. The truth came out when Betty Eagleton (Paula Tilbrook) read out a similar letter from Sandy. Jimmy admitted that he hadn't written the letter but Nicola demanded he write her a love letter, despite his insistence that he wasn't very good at it. He was proved right and after another argument caused by Jimmy telling Nicola she was curvaceous, which she interpreted as fat, he ended it and Lexi Nicholls (Sally Oliver) insisted that she move out, persuading Laurel Thomas (Charlotte Bellamy) to let Nicola move back into the vicarage. In May 2009, Nicola discovered she was pregnant but didn't tell Jimmy so Rodney did and Jimmy wooed her into a reconciliation, planning to let her tell him about the baby when she was ready. When Nicola found out, she was furious and dumped him again and considered giving the baby up for adoption but Laurel convinced her not to. Jimmy and Nicola bonded when they went for a scan and they decided to give things another go. Nicola returned to Mill Cottage and supported Lexi after her ectopic pregnancy and shock discovery that she was unlikely to conceive again. Scarlett offered to pay for their IVF but Carl told Jimmy (as Scarlett's trustee), not to release the money as he didn't want any more children. Horrified, Nicola insisted Carl tell Lexi. He did and she threw him out, leaving Nicola to comfort her but this led to a fight and Nicola fell down the stairs. Lexi called an ambulance and Nicola and the baby got the all-clear but Nicola blamed Carl for the fight and told him so, warning him to be honest with Lexi. On 6 August, Nicola gave birth prematurely to baby Angelica, who spent a few days in the special care unit. On the 13th, Nicola went for a shower and Lexi took Angelica up to the roof to show her the world. Although Jimmy, Nicola and Scarlett were terrified she'd harm Angelica, Lexi convinced Nicola to trust her and Carl finally admitted that he didn't want any more children and never had. She returned Angelica to Nicola and after a verbal and physical fight with Carl, she left him and Emmerdale for good.

In July 2010, Nicola and Jimmy bought The Woolpack from Diane Sugden (Elizabeth Estensen) but pulled out in September to spend more time with Angelica. Nicola noticed that Jimmy was becoming distant, unaware that he was meeting Kelly in Peterborough and giving her money. Kelly suggested they reconcile but he hadn't forgiven her for the abortion, so they argued. Jimmy asked Kelly to leave but she wouldn't and fearing that he was going to hit her, she hit him with a torch and knocked him unconscious. She panicked and fled, leaving Nicola and Carl to worry about Jimmy's disappearance. The police found the van in Peterborough and Jimmy was found in a hospital in Nottingham, suffering from amnesia. He didn't recognise Nicola, Carl or the village when he was released. Kelly visited to apologise to Jimmy for attacking him and was shocked when he didn't recognise her but used this to convince him that they were having an affair and that he was going to leave Nicola for her, before introducing him to her son, Elliot. Jimmy is stunned to learn that he is Elliot's father and Kelly shows him and Carl DNA test results, proving her claims. Jimmy asks Kelly not to tell anyone as he didn't want any more trouble but Rodney told Nicola, causing a fight between Kelly and Nicola in The Woolpack until Jimmy took Kelly home. Kelly further manipulated Jimmy and tried to make him remember proposing her to her by taking him to the spot where he had proposed. Jimmy refused to reconcile with Kelly as he didn't want to hurt Nicola and Angelica and offered her financial support for Elliot. At church one day, Jimmy remembers part of his and Kelly's wedding day, later telling Kelly that he remembered how he felt about her at the time and they sleep together, bringing back more memories. Jimmy feels guilty about hurting Nicola and Angelica but tells Nicola about their relationship and asks for a divorce before moving Kelly and Elliot into Mill Cottage soon after, much to Carl's discomfort. Jimmy and Kelly have a play fight with a cushion and when Kelly hits him on the head, Jimmy remembers that she caused his injuries. He tells Nicola, who suggests he call the police but he demands that Kelly tell him the truth. She admits attacking him and Jimmy tries to make amends with Nicola but, again manipulated by Kelly, ends up spending time with her and Elliot instead of Nicola and Angelica. Kelly hugs Jimmy when he buys Elliot some new clothes and offers to buy her a house and support Elliot but reminds Kelly that he doesn't want her back. However, Kelly won't give up and goes to Mill Cottage with Elliot when Jimmy has Angelica and goads Nicola into attacking her. Knowing that Nicola is on probation, she threatens to call the police but Jimmy warns Kelly that if she reports Nicola, he will report her and take custody of Elliot. Kelly backs down and agrees to leave the village but gives Jimmy an ultimatum: leave Emmerdale with her and Elliot or never see his son again. Jimmy chooses to stay and tries to make amends to Nicola but she struggles to forgive him for his affair, telling him that she wants to go ahead with the divorce. In September 2011, they prepare to divorce but reconcile and Nicola and Angelica move back into Mill Cottage.

In late 2012, Charity worms her way into Emmerdale Haulage by getting a contract that the Kings' needed. She gives them the contract on the condition that they give her 20% of the business, which Jimmy and Carl reluctantly agree to. This led to Carl and Jimmy arguing frequently as Charity is determined to drive a wedge between them, which results in Carl evicting Jimmy, Nicola and Angelica. In October 2012, Carl is murdered by Cameron Murray, leaving Jimmy the only King brother left. It is revealed in Carl's will that he left his estate to Jimmy. In August 2015, Jimmy admits he is in financial trouble and sells Mill Cottage. Rakesh Kotecha (Pasha Bocarie) makes an offer, wanting to turn the house into luxury flats, but another couple offer more than Rakesh and Jimmy accepts. However, Rakesh tells the couple that he is Jimmy's lawyer and says that he has had a higher offer. They pull out, forcing Jimmy to accept Rakesh's offer, £265,000. Jimmy has the last laugh, when the couple raise their offer but Jimmy sells to Rakesh and not report him for fraud, providing he signs his house, Victoria Cottage, over in part-exchange. When Nicola finds out what has happened, on her return, she is not amused, but eventually accepts it.

== Reception ==
In August 2017, Miles was longlisted for Funniest Male at the Inside Soap Awards. He made the viewer-voted shortlist, although lost to Dominic Brunt, who portrays Paddy Kirk.

Jimmy's amnesia storyline received mostly negative responses from viewers. Many claiming the storyline is "cringe-worthy", "hard to watch" and "unbelievable" due to many fans enjoying the Jimmy-Nicola match.

In June 2020, the British broadcasting authority Ofcom received twelve complaints, regarding a scene featuring Jimmy telling a coronavirus joke. The character's dialogue was "at least we don't have to do the school run. Thank you coronavirus."
