= David Metcalfe =

Fictional character from Emmerdale

- Emmerdale character
- Portrayed by: Matthew Wolfenden
- Duration: 2006–2023
- First appearance: Episode 4527; 26 November 2006
- Last appearance: Episode 9849; 30 November 2023
- Introduced by: Keith Richardson
In-universe information
- Occupation: Businessperson
- Father: Eric Pollard
- Mother: Lydia Halliwell
- Stepmother: Val Pollard
- Half-brothers: Edward Pollock
- Wife: Alicia Gallagher (2012–2013, 2013–2015); Tracy Shankley (2016–2018)
- Sons: Theo Metcalfe
- Daughters: Amba Metcalfe
- Adoptive sons: Jacob Gallagher
- Granddaughters: Leyla Sugden (adoptive)

David Metcalfe is a fictional character from the British ITV soap opera Emmerdale, played by Matthew Wolfenden. It was reported in August 2023 that he was set to leave the soap after 17 years, due to a lack of "gritty" storylines. David's final scenes were broadcast on 30 November 2023.

== Storylines ==
Eric Pollard (Chris Chittell) had never divorced from his first wife, Eileen (Arbel Jones), and went on to have an affair with a woman named Lydia Halliwell in 1981. They split up with Eric leaving, knowing nothing the existence of his son, David Metcalfe, who was born shortly after.

David arrives in the village in late 2006, immediately turning the ladies' heads. He came to the village, looking for his biological father, Eric. Eric had left David's mother, Lydia Holloway, before David was born and stole £20,000 from her. He gets a job at the sweet factory so that he can find out more about his father, striking up a flirty friendship with fun-loving Del Dingle (Hayley Tamaddon) and hoped some romance would come of it, but was disappointed when Del mistakenly thought her uncle Zak Dingle (Steve Halliwell) was his father and distanced herself. The truth came out and Eric was stunned to discover that David was claiming to be his son. For some time after, Eric and David's relationship was difficult. David told Eric how Lydia had struggled financially before marrying his adoptive father, Mr. Metcalfe, who treated David like dirt. However, Eric made it clear that he didn't care and implied that Lydia had loose morals, so David hit him, making Eric determined to prove that David is lying. He conducted a secret DNA test which showed David was not his son – but Eric had not sent David's cup. A second test, however, confirmed that Eric was David's biological father.

David showed the village he was his father's son by evicting local businessman Rodney Blackstock (Patrick Mower) from a barn he had rented from Eric and starting a love/hate relationship with Jasmine Thomas (Jenna-Louise Coleman). Despite his father's disapproval of his friendship with Del, they continued to get along and David told Del about the money Eric had stolen from his late mother. David starts working on a plan to get the money back but Eric realised money was going missing and set up a secret CCTV camera to watch who used the office, and is devastated when he realizes what David is doing. After confronting his son, David admitted it and told him why. Eric apologised and they went into business together, deciding to bury the hatchet. Delilah's cousin Chas Dingle (Lucy Pargeter), a barmaid at the Woolpack pub, saw David with Katie Sugden (Sammy Winward). Chas challenged Katie and she told Chas that she and David spent a night together. Chas told Del, who also confronted Katie and realised Katie was telling the truth. Del took revenge by transferring the money David had taken from Eric into an account in her name, and left for South America.

David enters a relationship with part-time local reporter, Jasmine, but Jasmine discovers that Eric was swindling local pensioner Pearl Ladderbanks (Meg Johnson) out of her money while pretending to be her friend, also shocked to find that David knew. Jasmine told Pearl what Eric was doing and used her charms on David to get him to buy her a car, which she also gave to Pearl. Nicola De Souza (Nicola Wheeler) later arrives in 2007, widow of a much older man, millionaire tycoon Donald De Souza (Michael Jayston). Jasmine remembers her as "Nicola Blackstock", Rodney's trouble-making daughter, disliked by many of the villagers for her past behaviour. When Nicola claimed she'd changed, but Jasmine didn't believe her, soon proved to be right when Nicola lured David into having an affair with her, after Jasmine catches them sleeping together. Jasmine then takes revenge by writing an article about Nicola's husband Donald, in the local paper, revealing that Donald was not actually dead as Nicola had claimed. Jasmine had used the help of Miles De Souza (Ayden Callaghan), Nicola's stepson, in her plan, so that he could inherit the family business and their estate. Nicola, unable to prove Miles was drinking, wanted to inherit everything for herself, and so had resorted to lying about Donald's death.

David and Nicola's relationship was frequently turbulent, due to Nicola's behaviour. After Donald regained consciousness and came home from hospital, Nicola, Donald and Miles tried living together as a family at Holdgate Farm. When Donald finds out Nicola is sleeping with David, he hires actress Cindy Burton (Tiffany Chapman), telling Nicola she was his nurse to make her jealous. This failed as Nicola schemed to kill him and frame Cindy for Donald's murder so she would inherit his money, and tried numerous methods from torn carpet on the stairs to faulty wiring on a train set, but none worked as David, disgusted with her plans – which he had refused to have any part of – sabotaged every attempt. Again, Donald found out what Nicola was planning, and persuades Nicola to go with him up on the moors. He challenged her to push him over, but she could not do it. On their return to Holdgate Farm, Donald throws Nicola out, leading to her going to David, but he sent her away, not wanting to be with a woman who was capable of murder. However, David didn't want to be alone, and tried flirting with Katie. Unfortunately for him, she was with Grayson Sinclair (Christopher Villiers), and also pregnant with his baby. Despite having had a fight with Grayson, she turned David down. David once again tried flirting with Jasmine, but she refuses to go any further than having a few drinks with him, and turned him down. Upset at being rejected, David got nasty but Miles, who Jasmine was now attached to, escorted him out of the pub, and made sure David realised it was best to stay away from her.

In June 2008, Val Lambert's (Charlie Hardwick) daughter, Sharon Lambert (Victoria Hawkins), returned to the village briefly for her mother's wedding. Whilst in the village, David caught Sharon's eye and snogged him after the wedding. He only saw the relationship as a fun time, but she constantly called and texted him and helped get him business contacts. One of her friends had a dog she could not take on an overseas trip. Nicola, who was Sharon's rival, offered to dogsit. A few days later, the dogs went missing and David and Nicola only found one in the B&B where Sharon was staying. They overheard Sharon telling a friend that she didn't care about David, and was only staying until time for another big party with the rich and famous. At the Woolpack, Nicola informs Sharon that David had dumped her for Nicola. They get into a catfight and when David broke them up, she hits him over the head with a tray. Val, furious that Sharon had reneged on her offer to take her to the next big party, washed her hands of Sharon again. Sharon then said she wanted nothing to do with any of them and left.

Nicola and David continued to date throughout 2008, but near the end of the year, the relationship began to unravel when they learned the church was going to be sold. Seeing an opportunity to make a good profit, David worked with his father Eric to get the church, while Nicola worked to sabotage efforts to keep the church from being sold. Unfortunately for David, Nicola resented Eric's involvement, and began to bask in the new respect that her old friends and family had for her, and she began making genuine efforts to help the choir win a local competition. When David and Eric learned of her true motives, they exposed her at the competition, and David dumped her. He became attracted to Leyla Harding (Roxy Shahidi), who worked at Eric's factory. When he helps catch a burglar, Leyla agrees to go out with him. They get on well, until she felt he had little interest in what she wanted. When she told him she was not like Nicola, he says that was part of the problem. They went their separate ways for a few months, but grew closer in April 2009. Leyla confided in him about her mother's medical problems, and he gave her some money. Eric and Val manage to convince David that Leyla was lying to get his money. Although David was reluctant to believe them, he asked Leyla a few questions, and she was disgusted and dumped him. Annoyed with his father, David decided to find someone to run for Eric's Council seat. Former Councilman Alan Turner (Richard Thorp) suggested David run. David was unsure, but when Eric mocked him about the idea, David decided to go for it.

In June 2010 David was blackmailed by Nathan Wylde (Lyndon Ogbourne) in order to get a barn conversion for Declan Macey (Jason Merrells). Nathan set David up by getting a female friend of his to make a pass at David as it was being recorded on video. Nathan used the tape to blackmail David and also promised to ruin Eric's business, if David didn't give him what he wanted, he offered to pay the deposit on a house for David and Leyla, if David got him planning permission for the barn. David agreed and subsequently got a home for him and Leyla. Leyla later found the tape when her and David were doing up the house and believed he was having an affair, he managed to convince her that it was a setup and they reconciled.

In August 2010, David found out about Leyla's secret son Jacob Gallagher (Joe-Warren Plant) and this almost tore them apart, Leyla promised there was no more secrets and they reconciled but another secret came out when Leyla revealed that her sisters husband Justin Gallagher (Andrew Langtree) was, in fact, Jacob's biological father. Leyla and David pulled together when Jacob went missing and Leyla tried to convince David she loved him, but he hated that she had lied to him and moved out of the house and into the B&B with Eric and Val.

Leyla and David have since reconciled, when they decided that they could not bear to be apart. David's recently adoptive sister Amy Wyatt (Chelsea Halfpenny) takes a shine to David. He gives out impressions that he likes her, he also says that he "Really likes" her to her face when she is upset. Amy begins to try to make him jealous by sleeping with Cain Dingle (Jeff Hordley) and she calls Cain a sophisticated older man. David worries about her the most. David also shows much more concern about Amy and sticks up for her when Leyla accuses Amy of stealing £500 worth of stock from the shop because she thinks that Amy also stole £25 from Eric and Val's B&B "The Grange". Alicia Gallagher (Natalie Anderson), Leyla's sister, confesses to stealing from the shop. Amy then kisses David on the cheek when he says he believed it was not her.

Leyla could not bear to be around Jacob, and when Alicia attacks her for asking Jacob to stop calling Alicia "mum" and call her "mum" instead, Leyla leaves the village, leaving David with a shop, a wedding dress, and hundreds of pounds worth of debt. David gets drunk and goes into the Woolpack wearing Leyla's wedding dress. Alicia and David's best friend Nikhil Sharma (Rik Makarem) pull David out of the pub, after he agreed to marry Pearl. Nikhil persuades David to sober up and become a legitimate businessman. He sells his cleaning business and agrees to run the shop full-time, renaming it "David's".

In 2011, David took a shine to Alicia. They decided to be just friends and got married so that Jacob could keep living with David whilst Alicia served a prison sentence for assault. However this was short lived when Alicia had been sent to prison for punching Val. In 2012, Once Alicia had returned from prison she found out that David had begun a relationship with Priya Sharma (Fiona Wade). Alicia was jealous of this but hid her feelings for David but unbeknownst to her David had also felt the same way. In 2013, Alicia started a new relationship with local villager Dom Andrews and during this time David's feelings for Alicia grew stronger even though he was in a relationship with Priya but after Alicia got shot during Cameron Murray's (Dominic Power) siege in The Woolpack David decided he wanted to be with Alicia and not Priya, realising that he loves her, leaving Priya devastated the night before their wedding. Alicia and David begin a new relationship but it becomes rocky when Priya announces she is pregnant, but David reassures Alicia that he loves her and not Priya and is only standing by Priya because she is carrying his child. After some pestering from Leyla's son, Jacob (Alicia's adopted son, but biologically nephew) David gets down on one knee and proposes to Alicia for real this time. Alicia delighted with David, happily accepts. The pair get married and, coincidentally, David's ex-fiancée and Alicia's sister Leyla arrives back in the village, only to be told that it is David and Alicia's wedding day.

In March 2014, David discovers that Priya, who is pregnant with his baby, is suffering from severe anorexia nervosa and that their baby could be at risk. He is angry with Priya for not telling him and later he realises that Priya had told Alicia and Leyla before him. Every time she was confronted about her disorder, Priya lied saying that she had it under control or sometimes said that she didn't have a disorder full stop. She collapses in the cafe and is taken to hospital. Later, in April, Priya realises that she is bleeding and is rushed to hospital. David finds out and goes too. Priya later realises that she has to face up to the fact that she has a disorder and decides to check into a clinic to get professional help, much to the relief of David.

Priya is allowed out of the clinic on Day Release, and goes to find David in the shop, but only Alicia and Pearl are there. Priya gets pain and Pearl asks Alicia if it is wind, where Alicia says she doesn't know, as she has never been pregnant or had a baby, leaving Priya to look smug. Priya's smugness doesn't last long as her waters break and she goes into labour. Leyla arrives in the shop and Alicia and Leyla drive Priya to hospital in Alicia's new car. When the car breaks down because Leyla filled it with petrol (it was a diesel) Leyla and Alicia are forced to deliver Priya's baby on the back seat. Priya gives birth to David's daughter Amba in the car. Amba appears to be fine, despite being seven weeks early, but then stops breathing. Priya and Amba are taken to hospital where it is revealed Amba may not survive. David spends every waking hour by Amba's bedside, so Priya's brother Jai Sharma (Chris Bisson) and father Rishi Sharma (Bhasker Patel) tell him to stop leading Priya on. David is shocked, as he is only there for Amba, and is not too bothered what happens with Priya, as she is healthy and not in danger. He tells them that he only cares a small bit for Priya as she is the mother of Amba, but he is married to Alicia.

Amba pulls through and is allowed to be taken home weeks later. Priya struggles to cope as a single parent and calls David when she knows he is needed for the "Father Sons" race at Jacob's sportsday. David helps Priya with Amba but falls asleep listening to the baby soothing CD. Alicia tries ringing him, but unknown to everyone, Priya had switched David's phone off and snuggled up to him, pretending to herself that they were a couple, as she knew she still loved him. David wakes up, and pushing Priya away, rushes off to Jacob's sportsday, but finds out he has missed it. Alicia is furious, and tells David that he is not only Amba's dad, but Jacob's too. Alicia angrily confronts Priya, threatening to move away. David is annoyed that Alicia dealt with it when he himself wanted to do it, but is not too angry that Priya begins to back off him. David goes to see Priya and tells her that they would not be moving away, but that Priya is not important to him and that Amba may be his daughter, but she would not get his undying attention as he has two children. Priya is hurt to hear David say he has two children, and tells him that he only has one child, and he needs to start acting like it. David tells Priya that he is a husband and a father of a son and a daughter, and that she doesn't fit into the equation anymore, as his family is Alicia, Jacob and Amba.

In February 2015, Alicia is sexually assaulted by a teenager named Lachlan White (Thomas Atkinson), who is a member of Home Farm's new family, the Whites. Initially, none of the Whites believe Alicia when she tries to tell people, and Lachlan's mother Chrissie White (Louise Marwood) even calls Alicia "a paedophile". Eventually, after Lachlan and Jacob fight, David kidnaps Lachlan, and the entire village turns against the Whites, the truth comes out and Lachlan is arrested. All the time, David continues to support Alicia the best he can. Unfortunately, David and Alicia do not get the result they want when Lachlan is put on trial; as he's only a teenager, the court simply register Lachlan as a sex offender. Lachlan calls Alicia a bitch after the trial, which leaves her devastated. David is not best too pleased either.

Alicia and David then make plans to move to Portugal, deciding that they've had enough of the drama in the village. They are offered to look after a bar in the Algarve by Val's son Paul Lambert (Mathew Bose), Alicia takes Paul up on the offer, and they eventually leave with Jacob after making peace with Lachlan.

Things do not go to plan when in August 2015, Val is killed as a result of a helicopter crash into the village. David and Alicia return to the village to support Eric as he says goodbye to Val. However, the funeral derails when Eric hijacks Val's hearse and takes it into the countryside. David and Diane Sugden (Elizabeth Estensen) follow Eric and calmly get him to surrender the hearse. Eric does not return for Val's funeral to proceed, though, leaving David to read a note from Eric expressing his final goodbye to Val. David insists he remain in the village to support Eric, who is now shutting everyone out, against Alicia's wish. Eventually, a schism occurs in their marriage when Alicia declares that Eric no longer loves David, and he should just leave him. David is infuriated by this. They do make up, but eventually decide to separate as Alicia is unwilling to remain in the village, unlike David, who wants to stay because of his dad, Amba, and his shop, which he plans to buy back from Carly Hope (Gemma Atkinson). Jacob remains with David due to Leyla's insistence.

Throughout late 2015, David continues his attempts to get his dad to open up, but mostly fails. After Val's engagement ring is stolen, Eric boards up his house and refuses to see anyone. At Christmas time, Eric comes to his senses, and becomes reintegrated into the fabric of the village, especially after he finds the engagement ring among the rubbish bags. In March 2016, David worries for Eric when he begins acting like he did after Val died, just as Val's hilariously oversized headstone arrives in the village. Eric eventually tells David he's having trouble urinating, and David insists he go to the doctor, warning him that it could be a sign of cancer. Eric refuses, but eventually gives in and agrees to go, as long as David does as well. While waiting for Eric at the doctor's, Dr. Jermaine Bailey (Micah Balfour) offers to examine David after he says he himself has been having "troubles" recently. David is then shocked to find that he has a lump on one of his testicles, and that he'll need an ultrasound; Dr. Bailey warns it could be cancer. In the meantime, Eric is found to have nothing more than a simple urine infection.

David is left troubled by the possibility that he's facing a battle with testicular cancer, and is caught trying to take a picture of his testicles with his pants down by Leyla. She then takes a picture for him. While they talk about David's impending battle, the pair hug and David says that he "loves" Leyla, which Jacob overhears, and wrongly assumes David and Leyla to be an item. The following day; his 13th birthday, he confronts them about their encounter, and David sets the record straight, in the process telling Jacob that he might have cancer. Their bond is strengthened because of this. David marries Tracy Shankley (Amy Walsh) later that year. Eventually he recovers from cancer.

In 2018, Tracy's past as a prostitute is exposed when she gets a stalker. She is able to bring him to justice, but David's embarrassment over her past drives a wedge between them. David also has a one-night stand with Leyla following the end of her relationship with Pete Barton (Anthony Quinlan). After learning of David's affair and realizing that he is ashamed of her past, Tracy decides to end their marriage. David is crushed, but comes to accept the divorce. He starts a relationship with schoolteacher Maya Stepney (Louisa Clein), following the end of her marriage to Dr. Liam Cavanagh (Jonny McPherson).

On Christmas Day 2019, a baby is left at David's door with a note from his former girlfriend Maya asking for the baby to be taken care of. Maya had been revealed to be heavily pregnant in a previous episode when released from prison after entering a relationship with David's stepson Jacob after grooming him. The paternity of the baby was initially in doubt and a DNA test was done with the outcome revealing the baby to be David's son. David initially unable to bond with the baby after what Maya had done to his family eventually welcomes him into the family in a touching scene, naming the baby Theodore Eric Metcalfe.

David left Emmerdale on Thursday 30th November 2023 to visit his daughter, Amber and her mother, Priya, in London after discovering that Jacob and Victoria were in a relationship.

== Casting ==
Wolfenden originally auditioned for the role Eli Dingle. He had several auditions for the character until it was between Wolfenden and Joseph Gilgun, with the latter winning the role. Wolfenden told a reporter from Inside Soap that he was not aware that producers were already lining him up for the role of David. He had never trained as a professional actor before joining the serial and had to adjust to working in front of a camera. Wolfenden revealed that he was contracted until December and said that he was committed to staying with Emmerdale beyond that point.

== Development ==
In July 2009, Wolfenden told a reporter from Inside Soap that he would have liked viewers to see a different side to his character. He noted that because he previously portrayed David's "businessman" and "daft side" – a new gritty storyline for David would be challenging. Wolfenden told Inside Soap's reporter that he had tried to make David likeable throughout his tenure. He compared David to Eric, in the sense that they are "rogues" but everyone still likes them. David needs to be a bit of a "bad boy" to achieve this.

=== Relationship with Leyla Harding ===
He said that the question of "who is the girl for David?" was an open one. He said that David had been through quite a few relationship in a short time. However, he confirmed that David and Leyla Harding (Roxy Shahidi) would have longevity. Wolfenden was pleased with their romance because he had a good rapport with Shahidi. The following year, Shahidi told their reporter that David helped Lelya transform from a girl into a woman ready to run her own business. She added that David and Layla would face problems once again. However, they have a track record for overcoming their problems and obstacles to overcome, but they have a "strong and believable relationship to build on". Shahidi concluded that this was a promising trait and she was "rooting for them". Wolfenden later affirmed that Leyla was the right woman for David, but he had trouble understanding. He noted that people ask him as to why David is still with Leyla. The actor added that David put up with Leyla's antics including theft, infidelity and hiding a secret son - therefore he must think she is "the one".

== Reception ==
Kate Woodward of Inside Soap said that "dreamy David is our kind of guy. He's loyal, gorgeous and going places – which makes Leyla one very lucky lady! Of course we also love him for being a chip off the old Pollard block, which ramps up the entertainment factor no end." A writer from Holy Soap named David's most memorable moment as being "a showdown with his father, which ended in a tearful happy ending." A reporter writing for the Inside Soap Yearbook 2017 included David's multiple proposals to Tracey in their "A to Z" list of 2016, believing he "set a new soap record" with his "increasingly inventive ways". In August 2017, Wolfenden was longlisted for Sexiest Male at the Inside Soap Awards. He made the viewer-voted shortlist, but lost out to Davood Ghadami, who portrayed Kush Kazemi in EastEnders.
