= Jasmine Thomas (Emmerdale) =

Fictional character from Emmerdale

- Emmerdale character
- Portrayed by: Jenna-Louise Coleman
- Duration: 2005–2009
- First appearance: 30 June 2005
- Last appearance: 26 March 2009
- Introduced by: Kathleen Beedles
In-universe information
- Occupation: Student; Barmaid; Journalist
- Father: Luke Thomas
- Mother: Karen Thomas
- Grandfathers: Sandy Thomas
- Grandmothers: Dorothy Thomas
- Uncles: Ashley Thomas
- First cousins: Gabby Thomas; Arthur Thomas; Dotty Thomas; Daniel Thomas (adoptive)

Jasmine Thomas is a fictional character from the British ITV soap opera Emmerdale, played by Jenna-Louise Coleman. She made her first screen appearance in the episode broadcast on 30 June 2005 and her last appearance on 26 March 2009.

== Casting ==
Roxanne Pallett originally auditioned for the role of Jasmine, however, it was Coleman who was eventually cast. Coleman told Laura Davidson of the Sunday Mail that she had always wanted to act and planned on going to a drama school, but the audition for Emmerdale came up and she went for it. She said: "It was a big decision but I put drama school on the back burner to join the show. I might go back at some point but for now I just thank my lucky stars I've started off in this industry with such a fantastic break." The part of Jasmine was Coleman's first professional acting job and she relocated to Leeds to be near the set for filming.

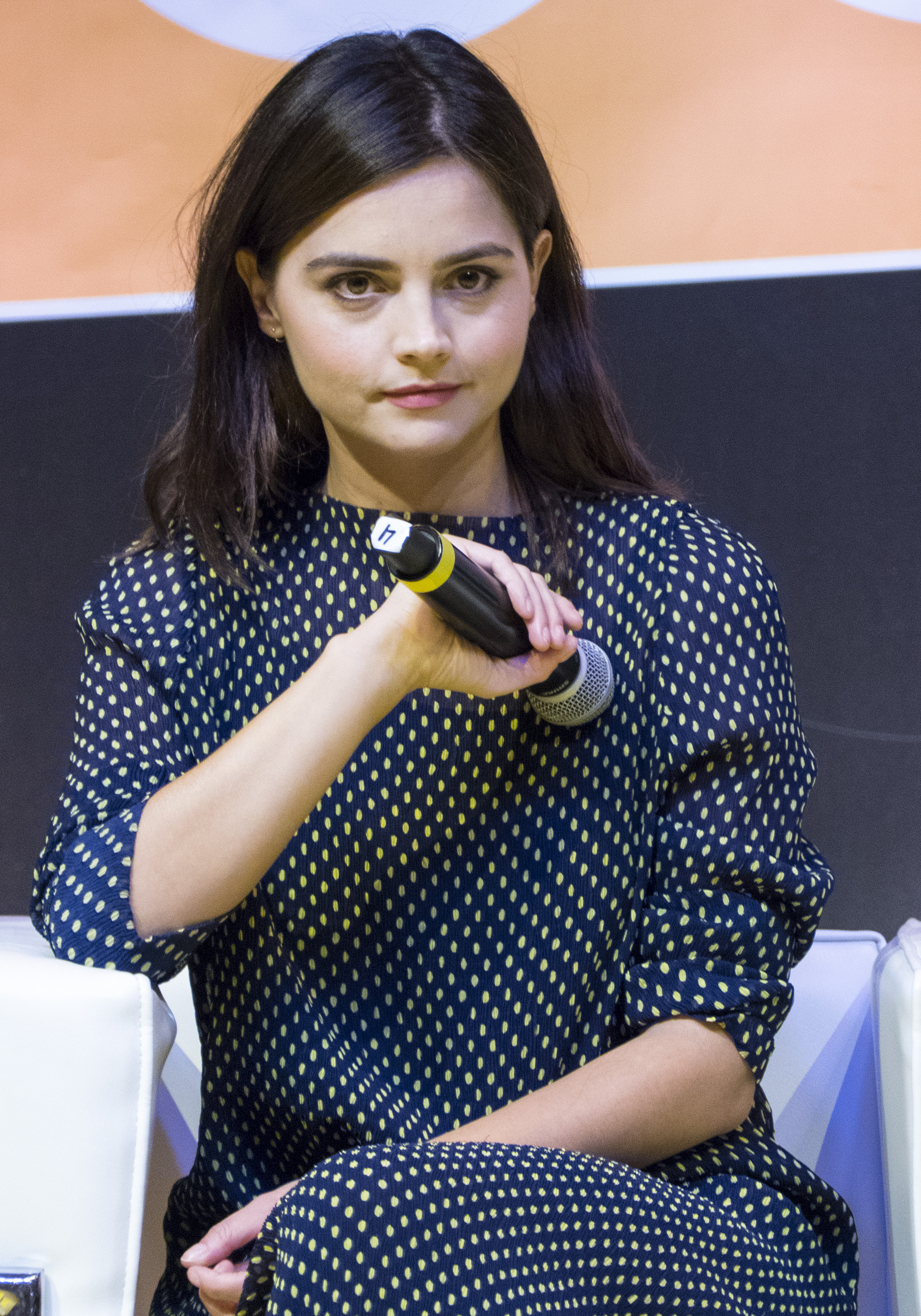
Jenna Coleman was cast in the role of Jasmine.

== Storylines ==
During the school holidays, Jasmine's parents Luke and Karen send her to stay with her uncle Ashley (John Middleton) in Emmerdale. Jasmine is lonely but soon befriends Steph Stokes (Lorraine Chase), Debbie Dingle (Charley Webb) and Daz Eden (Luke Tittensor). Jasmine returns when she is suspended from school and helps her grandfather, Sandy (Freddie Jones), settle in. Jasmine and Ashley's wife, Laurel (Charlotte Bellamy), helps Sandy and Ashley bond. After briefly returning to school, Jasmine is expelled but gets a place at the local college so she can take her A Levels. Debbie kisses Jasmine to get a reaction from her father, Cain (Jeff Hordley), but the girls realise their feelings for each other are stronger than friendship and start dating. Jasmine, however, is caught between Cain and Debbie as Cain seduces her. Jasmine is devastated to learn that Cain used her to spite Debbie, but they reconcile when Jasmine realises that she is pregnant. Debbie tells Cain that Jasmine plans to have an abortion, paid for by Sadie King (Patsy Kensit). Cain is devastated as he wanted her to have the baby, and Debbie tells him that Sadie was involved too.

Jasmine finds a job as a journalist and begins investigating Tom King's (Ken Farrington) murder. Jasmine discovers Jamie Hope (Alex Carter) lied about his whereabouts when Tom died and wonders if he was responsible but helps him clear his name. Jasmine begins dating David Metcalfe (Matthew Wolfenden) but they break up when David tells her that his father, Eric Pollard (Chris Chittell), is trying to cheat Pearl Ladderbanks (Meg Johnson) out of some money. Jasmine tells Pearl and gives her a car that David bought for her. Jasmine and David reconcile but she dumps him after catching him with Nicola De Souza (Nicola Wheeler). Jasmine gets revenge by exposing Nicola's lies about her husband, Donald De Souza (Michael Jayston), in the local paper and helps his son, Miles (Ayden Callaghan), reconcile with his father and stop drinking. They realise how strong their feelings for each other are and start dating but Jasmine ends it when he gets jealous about her being friends with Jake Doland (James Baxter). Jake and Jasmine start dating, despite tension between their families over the baby swap of Daniel and Arthur.

Jasmine decides to investigate a local criminal family; the McFarlanes. Using Debbie's contacts, she meets policeman Shane Doyle (Paul McEwan) at The Woolpack. Shane later goes to Jake's house, claiming there have been complaints about the noise and winds Jake up so much that Jake attacks him. Shane promptly arrests him for being drunk and disorderly while Jasmine dumps him for thinking that she'd cheat on him. Shane makes his personal interest clear but Jasmine is not interested until she learns Shane has arrested Danielle Hutch (Nicola Stapleton), a girl with ties to the McFarlanes. Debbie warns Jasmine to stay away from Shane but she refuses to listen. Shane tells Jasmine that he let Danielle go because he felt sorry for her and they sleep together. When Jasmine questions Shane further, he almost becomes violent so she searches his flat and finds large amounts of cash. Unfortunately he finds her hiding in a wardrobe and boasts about his illegal activities. Jasmine pretends to understand his reasons before trying to escape but Shane catches her and tries to rape her. Debbie arrives and hits Shane on the head with a chair leg, knocking him out briefly, but he comes round and grabs Debbie. Jasmine picks up the chair leg and repeatedly hits Shane again killing him. Debbie, Eli Dingle (Joseph Gilgun) and Jasmine wrap Shane's body up and dump it in a lake at Home Farm. Jasmine buys a plane ticket online using Shane's credit card, as he had some time off work but starts having nightmares. Shane's body is found by Victoria Sugden (Isobel Hodgins) after she falls into the lake. Debbie and Eli try to keep Jasmine calm before the police question her. Laurel, however, notices how jumpy Jasmine has become and asks if she is pregnant, making her laugh hysterically before admitting that she killed Shane so Laurel tells her that she must go the police. Jasmine agrees but on hearing of Ross Kirk (Samuel Anderson)'s arrest and that he has been charged with Shane's murder, Debbie and Eli persuade her to keep quiet but Jasmine's conscience gets the better of her and she tells Debbie that she wants to confess to the police. Calling her bluff, Debbie packs a bag and drives Jasmine to the police station. While there, the girls have a heart to heart and they kiss again and start dating again. However, Ross is cleared and Eli is arrested for Shane's murder so Debbie and Jasmine decide to go on the run. Debbie takes a taxi and Jasmine catches a bus to meet her but Debbie is arrested so Jasmine leaves alone. She visits Sandy in Scotland but returns and bursts into a court hearing for Debbie and admits killing Shane. After being questioned by the police, she is charged with manslaughter. Jasmine pleads guilty and is sentenced to four years in prison. Debbie visits and Jasmine tells her she does not want to see her any more because she needs to fit in. The two girls say goodbye and Jasmine tells her that their love will last forever, she is then led back to her cell.

== Reception ==
For her portrayal of Jasmine, Coleman received a nomination for Best Newcomer at the 2006 British Soap Awards. She also earned a nomination for Most Popular Newcomer at the 12th National Television Awards. The 2009 British Soap Awards saw Coleman garner nominations for Best Actress and Best Dramatic Performance. During a feature on lesbians in British soap operas, Sarah and Lee from AfterEllen said Jasmine and Debbie's relationship was "disappointing" and "cliché driven". They added "Even though they did rekindle their relationship later on the show, the handling of the plot was a failed opportunity for Emmerdale to retain its lesbian crown."
