= Donald De Souza =

Fictional character from Emmerdale

- Emmerdale character
- Portrayed by: Michael Jayston
- Duration: 2007–2008
- First appearance: 28 October 2007
- Last appearance: 20 November 2008
- Created by: Kathleen Beedles
In-universe information
- Occupation: Businessman
- Wife: Christine De Souza (backstory); Nicola Blackstock (2007–2008)
- Sons: Miles De Souza
- Daughters: Anna De Souza

Donald De Souza is a fictional character in the British ITV soap opera Emmerdale, played by Michael Jayston. Appearing between 2007 and 2008, Donald arrives as the husband of Nicola Blackstock (Nicola Wheeler), although their marriage quickly falls apart. During his year in the programme, Donald falls out with both his children, Anna (Emma Davies) and Miles (Ayden Callaghan), before he dies of a heart attack.

== Casting ==
On 13 September 2008, the Daily Mirror reported that Michael Jayston and Matthew Bose - who plays Paul Lambert - had both quit the soap. The article said that morale was said to be at "an all-time low" and the cast and crew "have slammed the show's tacky storylines and lack of direction since the arrival of producer Anita Turner." An ITV spokesman confirmed the two were leaving but denied it was because of low morale.

== Storylines ==
Donald makes his first appearance in Emmerdale village when he is on life support in hospital after a brain haemorrhage. His second wife, Nicola Blackstock (Nicola Wheeler), returns to Emmerdale, claiming to be a widow. Jasmine Thomas (Jenna-Louise Coleman), an aspiring local journalist, is annoyed that Nicola is flirting with her boyfriend, David Metcalfe (Matthew Wolfenden), and discovers that Donald is in a coma in hospital. In late December, Donald regains consciousness and is aware that Nicola only married him for his money.

When Donald's alcoholic son Miles (Ayden Callaghan) - who Jasmine had tracked down - discovers Nicola's affair with David, he tells Donald, who demands a divorce. However, Nicola agrees to end the affair and he comes home from hospital, moving into Holdgate Farm. He hires an actress, Cindy Burton (Tiffany Chapman), as his "nurse", annoying Nicola, who tries to murder Donald repeatedly, hoping people will blame Cindy. David ends his relationship with Nicola when Donald offers him a position in the business, and tells him about Nicola's attempts to kill him. However, he takes her for a picnic on the moors and confronts her, giving her the opportunity to push him off a cliff. He even taunts her by pushing his wheelchair near the cliff edge and almost falls. Nicola can't do it, however, so they return to the village and he throws her out but refuses to tell the police about her behaviour. The subsequent divorce battle sees Nicola try to get as big a settlement as she can. His final offer is £20,000, which she accepts days before his death.

A successful businessman, Donald's company, "De Souza Enterprises", takes over the refuse collection contract from the Kings and persuades Carl to join him. Miles De Souza, after numerous arguments with his father and ending his relationship with Jasmine, leaves the village in August 2008.

In July, Donald's daughter Anna (Emma Davies) arrives in the village, having lived in Dubai for years after arguing over a man Anna was in love with. However, they reconcile and she gets a position in the company - coming into conflict with Carl King. Carl later betrays the De Souzas when he gives a contract to his brothers. Donald then buys Carl out and determined to get revenge, Donald and Anna agree on a plan - she will ingrain herself with the Kings so she can get the details on important contracts and steal it. However, she finds herself falling in love with Matthew King (Matt Healy), and cannot betray him as planned. Donald is furious about this and attempts to break them up. When Matthew and Anna get engaged, they have a dinner party to celebrate. Hoping to make amends, Anna invites Donald - but he is disruptive, saying Anna only wants Matthew for his money. After he leaves, Matthew visits Donald at Holdgate Farm and during a heated argument, Donald has a heart attack. Matthew withholds Donald's pills until he agrees to come to the wedding and put Anna back in his will, but Donald dies due to Matthew not giving him the medication. Matthew leaves and does not tell anyone what happened. A coroner later rules Donald died from a heart attack and he is buried in the village.

== Reception ==
Writing on his "Soapland" blog for the Daily Mirror, Tony Stewart wrote on 15 November 2008 that for an actor of Jayston's "calibre", the storyline of the Kings versus the De Souza was "dull" and rarely did "justice to his talents". However, he says that there "are flashes of passion as Donald makes his exit in a body bag".
