= Law and Disorder (TV series) =

1994 British television series

- Genre: Sitcom
- Starring: Penelope Keith; Simon Williams; Charles Kay; Eamon Boland; John Junkin; Emma Davies
- Country of origin: United Kingdom
- Original language: English
- No. of series: 1
- No. of episodes: 6

Production
- Producer: John Howard Davies
- Running time: 30 minutes

Original release
- Network: ITV
- Release: 17 January – 21 February 1994

Law and Disorder is a British sitcom that aired on ITV in 1994. Starring Penelope Keith, it was written by Alex Shearer, who had also written No Job for a Lady, in which Keith also appears. It was directed and produced by John Howard Davies. Law and Disorder was made for the ITV network by Thames Television and Central Television.

== Cast ==
- Penelope Keith — Philippa Troy
- Simon Williams — Gerald Triggs
- Charles Kay — Judge Wallace
- Eamon Boland — Arthur Bryant
- John Junkin — Steven
- Emma Davies — Susan
- Geoffrey Davies — Harold

== Plot ==
The main character in Law and Disorder was Philippa Troy, a widowed acid-tongued barrister, who used a no-nonsense, and sometimes illegal, approach to winning cases. She always won, often beating Gerald Triggs. Troy also wrote a series of children's books called Prickly Peter, and drove an open-top sports car. Other characters were her solicitor Arthur Bryant, clerk Steven, her junior Susan and the Judge.

== Episodes ==
1. "What Goes Up" (17 January 1994)
2. "One for the Album" (24 January 1994)
3. "A Night to Remember" (31 January 1994)
4. "A Slip of the Pen" (7 February 1994)
5. "The Cannibal" (14 February 1994)
6. "Safe as Houses" (21 February 1994)

== DVD releases ==
The complete series of Law and Disorder was released on 5 May 2014 by Network.
