= Nicola King =

Fictional character from Emmerdale

- Emmerdale character
- Portrayed by: Nicola Wheeler
- Duration: 2001–present
- First appearance: Episode 2827; 10 January 2001
- Introduced by: Keith Richardson
- Spin-off appearances: Emmerdale: The Dingles, For Richer for Poorer (2010)
In-universe information
- Other names: Nicola Blackstock; Nicola De Souza
- Occupation: Barmaid; Businesswoman; Pub landlady Personal assistant Hotel clerk Sweet Packer; Councillor; Café owner Cleaner
- Father: Rodney Blackstock
- Mother: Maureen Blackstock
- Half-brothers: Paul Lambert
- Half-sisters: Bernice Blackstock
- Husband: Donald De Souza (2007–2008); Jimmy King (2010–2026)
- Daughters: Angelica King
- Adoptive sons: Elliot Windsor; Carl Holliday
- Stepsons: Miles De Souza
- Stepdaughters: Anna De Souza
- Nieces: Gabby Thomas; Dee Dee
- Other relatives: Thomas Tate

Nicola King (also Blackstock and De Souza) is a fictional character from the British ITV soap opera Emmerdale. She has been played by Nicola Wheeler since she joined the soap in 2001. Wheeler left the role in January 2006, with her on-screen departure airing in March. In July 2007, it was announced that Wheeler had chosen to return to the soap eighteen months later and Nicola made her return on 12 September 2007. Wheeler took maternity leave throughout 2015, which was woven into the soap as Nicola departing temporarily on 26 March 2015, to work in Dubai for six months. She made a brief appearance on the soap on 7 May 2015, via webcam, and then made her full-time return on 11 November 2015, when she returned from Dubai due to an incident that happened there.

== Casting ==
Nicola Blackstock was first introduced by series producer Kieran Roberts, who cast Nicola Wheeler in 2001. She arrived after getting in touch with her father Rodney (Patrick Mower). He had come to Emmerdale to get to know his older daughter, Bernice Blackstock (Samantha Giles). In January 2006, it was announced that Wheeler had quit her role after five years on the show as she felt the time was right to try something new. Wheeler left in March 2006. In July 2007, it was announced that Wheeler had reprised the role, and Nicola returned on 12 September of that year, 18 months after initially leaving the soap. In 2015, Wheeler took maternity leave, and Nicola left screens on 26 March 2015. She made a brief reappearance on 7 May 2015, via webcam, and then made her full-time return on 11 November 2015, when she was kicked out of Dubai for an incident that happened to her there.

== Storylines ==
Nicola arrives to meet her older half-sister, Bernice Blackstock (Samantha Giles) and stays with their father Rodney Blackstock (Patrick Mower). She meets and befriends Emily Dingle (Kate McGregor). Within months, Nicola becomes interested in chef Carlos Diaz (Gary Turner), unaware that he is having an affair with Bernice. She chases him for a while before they ended up in bed after Bernice dumped him, wanting to make her marriage work. Scared she might lose Carlos, Nicola announces she is pregnant and is stunned yet elated when he proposes, which she accepts.

On her hen night, Bernice catches her drinking vodka and Nicola admits she is lying about being pregnant. Bernice, pregnant herself, is horrified and insists she tell Carlos before the ceremony. Furious with Nicola's lies, Carlos confesses his affair with Bernice and tells her that Bernice's baby could possibly his. On the day of the wedding, Nicola attacks Bernice with her bouquet before announcing the wedding is off. She then tells Bernice's husband Ashley Thomas (John Middleton) about her affair and the fact that he may not be the father of Bernice's baby. Nicola's mother, Maureen suggests she goes home with her but she decides to stay with Rodney and eventually forgives Bernice and becomes godmother to her newborn niece, Gabby Thomas (Annelise Manojlovic).

Nicola undergoes a personality change and falls out with Emily but they reconcile. She seduces Robert Sugden (Karl Davies) much to the annoyance of the village due to Robert's age. Nicola is bridesmaid when Emily marries Paddy Kirk (Dominic Brunt) in October 2002. Nicola frequently clashes with Viv Hope (Deena Payne), and local siren Chloe Atkinson (Amy Nuttall). She dumps Robert by allowing him to see her having sex with builder Syd Woolfe (Nathan Gladwell) in her living room. Nicola's relationship with Syd comes to a halt when she finds out he is also having an affair with Chloe who is dating Scott Windsor (Ben Freeman)..

After successfully starting a cleaning business and employing Pearl Ladderbanks (Meg Johnson), Betty Eagleton (Paula Tilbrook) and Laurel Potts (Charlotte Bellamy), Nicola meets Geordie fishmonger Simon Meredith (Dale Meeks) in November 2003 and after a bumpy start, they begin dating. However, there are many obstacles, such as his ex-fiancée Tash Abbott (Sally Evans) and his mother, Lesley Meredith (Sherrie Hewson). Nicola was desperate to settle down and dreamed of the perfect marriage. Following the engagement, problems escalate when Lesley finds herself in debt and Simon continually bails her out, forcing the wedding to be put on hold. Bored with Simon and their financial problems, Nicola tries repeatedly to seduce her half-brother Paul Lambert's (Matthew Bose) bisexual lover, Ivan (Daniel Brocklebank), who is also friends with Simon. Lesley witnesses one of Nicola's attempts and tells Simon who dumps Nicola. After Paul and Rodney disown her, Nicola leaves the village.

In September 2007, Nicola with a business proposition for David Metcalfe (Matthew Wolfenden) who has since purchased Laurel and Nicola's cleaning business. Nicola wants the business back but David is unwilling. She tries to seduce David and is successful and they have sex. Jasmine Thomas (Jenna-Louise Coleman), David's girlfriend catches them and exposes Nicola's lie about being a widow as her current husband Donald De Souza is still alive but in a coma following a brain haemorrhage. Donald regains consciousness in late December and Nicola, wanting his inheritance, plots to murder him and asks David to help much to his horror. David refuses and tells Donald. Nicola, presented with the opportunity to kill Donald on some cliffs, confesses and he agrees not to tell the police providing he leaves her house. Rodney, unaware of this, rents Mill Brook Cottage and makes it clear that Nicola has to pay half the rent. She asks David for a job but all he is offering was scrubbing floors. She works for him briefly but goes to work for Paddy as his chauffeur after accidentally injuring him, making him unable to drive.

Nicola decides to write a children's book, based on tales Rodney has told Gabby about his days working at the fairground and sells the stories to the publisher. Rodney discovers this when the book is about to be published Rodney finds out and gave her an ultimatum - tell the truth or stop calling him Dad. She refuses so Rodney kicks her out. She moves in with Edna Birch (Shirley Stelfox), following brief stays with the Pollards and her brother, Paul and Katie Sugden (Sammy Winward). When Mark (Maxwell Caulfield) and Natasha Wylde (Amanda Donohoe) buy Farm Estates Nicola applies for the position of estate manager at Home Farm and is successful due to impressing Natasha. Nicola often struggles to stay within her boundaries as she is expected to be the Wyldes' personal assistant too. Nicola soon begins a relationship with Jimmy King, which has a rocky start. In May 2009, Nicola learns she is 17 weeks pregnant, to her shock and asks for a second opinion. She considers abortion and adoption but is talked out of both by Laurel. After an argument with Carl King's (Tom Lister) wife Lexi King, Nicola falls down the stairs and is left unconscious. Lexi, horrified at pushing Nicola, calls the ambulance. Nicola is fine and discharged the same day, but goes into labour several days later while locked in the farm shop. Rodney and Cain Dingle (Jeff Hordley) get Nicola to hospital, where she gives birth to a daughter, Angelica with Jimmy by her side. When Angelica is put into an incubator and taken for further treatment, they worry but the doctors assure them. Further panic comes when Lexi takes Angelica up onto the roof to show her the view. Nicola and Jimmy are worried but Lexi hands her back and then argues with Carl about their marriage.

When Viv and Bob Hope's (Tony Audenshaw) daughter, Cathy (Gabrielle Dowling), bites another child at the village playgroup, Nicola bites her so Cathy would know what it felt like. However, Viv calls the police and they press charges. A custodial sentence seems likely but Viv writes a letter to the court, asking them to show leniency as she did not think the case would go to court and as a result, Nicola is sentenced to probation. Nicola and Jimmy consider buying the Woolpack assisted by Jimmy's half-sister, Scarlett Nicholls (Kelsey-Beth Crossley), but pull out of in September as Nicola fears she cannot cope with being landlady and a new mother.

In February 2011, Nicola discovers Jimmy has been involved in an accident and is receiving treatment in hospital. However, on arrival, she is shocked to learn he has lost all memory and has no idea who she or Angelica are. Jimmy is persuaded by Kelly that she and he were having an affair before his accident and that he was ready to leave Nicola. Jimmy and Nicola split as Jimmy takes Kelly's side of the story and the pair get together, with the son Kelly tells him is his. Jimmy's memory begins to return and he sees Kelly's true colours. Despite this, Nicola is hurt that Jimmy has slept with Kelly, and refuses to get back with him. The pair prepare for a divorce but after an argument, the pair end up in a passionate kiss.

In 2013, Nicola wants to send Angelica to a posh school but when Jimmy tells her they cannot afford it she is loaned the money from Bernice's boyfriend Steve Harland (Tom Mannion) who is only too happy to give her it as he is attracted to her. A few weeks after Nicola and Steve are sitting in Steve's having wine and they kiss. Nicola quickly backs away and attempt's to leave but Steve stops her telling her that he enjoys spending time with her and what Jimmy and Bernice don't know won't hurt them. The next day Steve tells Nicola he has booked a hotel room for them and she considers going but after playing with Jimmy and Angelica she realises that she could never cheat on Jimmy but when she tells Steve this he tells her that if she doesn't sleep with him then she will have to give him his money back and if she tells anyone he will tell everyone that they have been having an affair and that she stole 10 grand of him. When she arrives at the hotel she tells him the best offer he is going to get is 1 night with her then they are quits, after she agrees he kisses her and try's to undress her just as Bernice walks in and reveals that Nicola told her everything but Steve tells them both that Bernice has been using him and that she isn't as special as she thinks and before he leaves the hotel he warns Nicola that "she isn't coming out of this squeaky clean" and she relies she will have to tell Jimmy everything before Steve does. The next day Nicola tells Jimmy that she has been borrowing money from Steve and that he has been trying to blackmail her into sleeping with him and Jimmy is furious, he goes outside and finds Steve and smashes his van up, after Steve tells Ashley, Rodney and Diane Sugden (Elizabeth Estensen) what he thinks of them Jimmy gives Steve a check for 10 grand but after Steve makes a nasty comment about Nicola Jimmy punches him and tells him if he ever sees his face again he will rip it off. Steve then leaves the village. Nicola and Jimmy's marriage becomes very strained over the next couple of weeks until Nicola is one of the people taken her brother-in-law's escaped killer Cameron Murray (Dominic Power) when she is free her and Jimmy reminisce. Jimmy and Nicola are still together even after she miscarries their baby and in she goes and works at the Atlantis hotel in Dubai when Jimmy and Angel were still in Yorkshire. She returns after from Dubai, she is shocked to see Jimmy has sold their house so breaks into it.

In June 2016, Nicola gets caught in a fire started by Rakesh Kotecha (Pasha Bocarie). She is pulled out by Ronnie Hale (John McArdle) and Dan Spencer (Liam Fox) and taken to hospital. She discharges herself the next day and Jimmy takes her home. She later collapses and Jimmy calls an ambulance. She is told that she is partially paralysed and that she might never walk again, though she eventually recovers.

On 27 August 2026, Nicola was riding a bike along the road where she discovered a car accident involving Jimmy King, Joe Tate and Dawn Fletcher. Nicola rushed in to see Jimmy in the car losing blood fast. She stayed with Jimmy until he passed away and then Joe told her and Dawn to leave him but save themselves so they ran out just before the emergency services arrived.

== Reception ==
For her role as Nicola, Wheeler won Best Bitch at the 2006 British Soap Awards. She was also nominated for Villain of the Year at the British Soap Awards in 2002, 2008 and 2009. She was then nominated for the All About Soap Bad Girl award in 2009 and was nominated for most shocking baby plot in 2010. She was nominated for Inside Soap's Bad Bitch award in 2009 and in a poll run by website Digital Spy, 95% of voters were on Nicola's side of Jimmy's amnesia storyline. Wheeler was also longlisted for "Best Comic Performance" at the 2025 Inside Soap Awards.

In September 2012, Kate White of Inside Soap praised Nicola's comedic reactions and named her 'our hero', "We love Nicola having a front-row seat at Home Farm Estates. Her comedy reactions make all that business vastly more bearable." In 2022, Laura-Jayne Tyler from the same magazine praised the storyline where Nicola was attacked, writing, "Nicola Wheeler is such a reliable source of comedy for Emmerdale that she doesn't perhaps receive nearly enough credit for her dramatic work. The scene where Bernice finds her sister paralysed with fear, sobbing on the living room clutching a basketball bat, was comfortably among the most powerful moments of the year. Stellar stuff from a top-class actress."

== See also ==
- List of soap opera villains
