= Paul Marsden (Emmerdale) =

Fictional character from Emmerdale

- Emmerdale character
- Portrayed by: Matthew Booth
- Duration: 2003–2004
- First appearance: 10 March 2003
- Last appearance: 6 July 2004
- Created by: Steve Frost
In-universe information
- Occupation: Postal worker
- Father: Ronnie Marsden
- Mother: Frances Marsden
- Brothers: Alistair Marsden
- Sisters: Elaine Marsden
- Wife: Siobhan Marsden (2003–2004)

Paul Marsden is a fictional character from the British soap opera Emmerdale, played by Matthew Booth. The character made his first appearance during the episode broadcast on 10 March 2003. The character was killed off the following year, after an altercation with Carl King (Tom Lister). Booth made his final appearance as Paul during the episode broadcast on 6 July 2004.

== Development ==
On 15 February 2003, a reporter from Inside Soap announced Emmerdale's plans to introduce a new family, the Mardens. They featured a promotional cast photograph of the family, which included Booth as Paul.

The family consisted of Paul and his wife Siobhan Marsden (Abigail Fisher), his parents Frances Marsden (Sandy Walsh) and Ronnie Marsden (Ray Ashcroft). Also introduced were Paul's sister Elaine Marsden (Samantha McCarthy) and his brother Ali Marsden (Danny Tennant). Siobhan works as a district nurse in the nearby town of Hotten. Booth told All About Soap's Joanne Tebbutt that the Marsden family are "quite a normal bunch, a little disjointed and crazy at times, but that's what keeps them interesting." The family decide to move to Emmerdale village to aid his father's job as a truck driver. They previously resided in the nearby town of Hotten, but Ronnie could not find places to park his truck. Paul's brother Ali is portrayed as having a heart condition. The family believe that transitioning to the country lifestyle will help improve Ali's health prospects. Booth stated that Siobhan prefers city life more than living in a small village. She sacrifices her own happiness to please Paul, who had been unhappy working as a hospital porter in Hotten.

Paul is characterised as a "relaxed young man" who is "definitely no pushover". He is like his mother, Frances and has inherited her "strong moral values". He is portrayed as being "laid back", he prefers an easy life and wants to "keep things simple". Ashcroft told Allison Maund from Inside Soap that "Paul is a very practical character who's also a bit of an artist. He makes furniture and has a natural flair for art and design."

After they had been on-screen for six months, Emmerdale producer Steve Frost decided to axe the majority of the Marsden family. Frost decided to keep Paul and Siobhan in the series but Ronnie, Frances, Alistair and Elaine would all depart the series in December 2003. Of his decision, Frost stated "The Marsdens have got a great story to play through the autumn, but unfortunately this culminates in them leaving the village." On his plans for the remaining characters he added that "Paul and Siobhan Marsden will be staying on and the young couple have got some trying times ahead."

Both remained in the show until 2004, when his character was killed off. The story featured Carl King (Tom Lister) accidentally causing Paul's death.

== Storylines ==
When Paul and his family arrive in the village, Paul initially works as a porter, alongside his nurse wife Siobhan. Paul actually wants to be a carpenter, and does some jobs with Syd Woolfe (Nathan Gladwell), but he finally finds a full-time job at the post office, beating Marlon Dingle (Mark Charnock) to the role.

When Paul's family move away, Siobhan and Paul stay in Victoria Cottage. They seem to have many happy years ahead, but tragedy occurs when Paul attempts to fix a roof with Carl. They get into a fight the day before over a package Carl had not wanted Paul to deliver. They reconcile and get onto the roof. Paul jokingly throws some tools to Carl. Carl throws some back, but when Paul tries to catch them, he falls off the roof. Carl calls his brothers, who move Paul's corpse to his garden. Siobhan finds him and cradled his lifeless body in her arms. No one ever discovers the truth about Paul's death. After his death, Siobhan discovers that she is pregnant.

== Reception ==
Sally Brockway from Soaplife believed that writers originally never fully developed Paul and Siobhan until the pregnancy storyline. She added that Paul was the postman and with Siobhan, they "seem a nice enough couple" but nothing more was portrayed to viewers prior to the storyline. An Inside Soap writer praised Emmerdale for its success in introducing the Marsden family. They noted that new families introduced into soap often fail. They opined that the show managed to succeed with the Marsden's who fitted "effortlessly into the show", adding "they're all great".
