= Matthew Booth (actor) =

English actor

Matthew James Booth is an English actor from Normanton, West Yorkshire. He is well known for playing the role of postman Paul Marsden on ITV's Emmerdale from 2002 until the character's death in 2004. He has also appeared in Coronation Street, At Home with the Braithwaites, The Royal, The Ward and Hollyoaks. He once appeared in a Vodafone commercial with David Beckham.
