= Emma Davies (actress) =

British actress

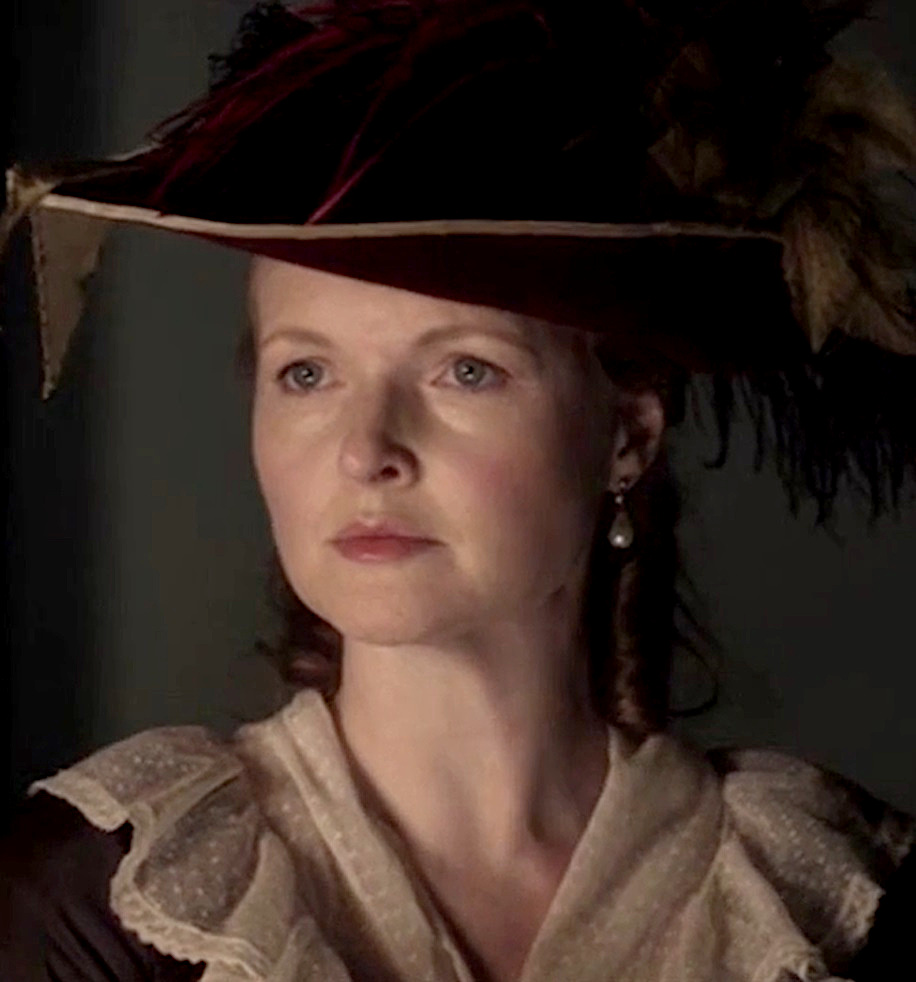
- Davies in Garrow's Law (Season 2) 2010
- Born: Emma-Kate Davies; 7 March 1970 (age 56); England
- Occupation: Actress
- Years active: 1987–present
- Spouse: Ross Allen
- Children: Camille
- Parent(s): Geoffrey Davies; Ann Davies

Emma-Kate Davies (born 7 March 1970) is an English actress. She is the daughter of actor Geoffrey Davies, of the television comedy series Doctor in the House. She is notably recognised for her role of Anna De Souza in the ITV soap Emmerdale and for her portrayal of Diana Mitford-Guinness (later Lady Diana Mosley) in the Channel 4 mini series Mosley. She currently resides in south-west London with her husband Ross Allen, a garden designer, and their daughter Camille.

== Early life and career ==
Davies' father, the stage and television actor Geoffrey Davies, influenced her choice of career immensely. He would often let her watch his stage performances from the wings as a child. She says that she "watched his plays nearly every night" and "knew all the lines." He also landed Emma her first television role at the age of 18 months on the 1970s sitcom, The Fenn Street Gang. She says, "I was in a pram and had to stuff an ice cream cone into someone's face!". She also appeared in a television advert for Colgate toothpaste when she was 14.

She trained at the Corona Theatre School in London, and has been acting in small TV roles since the mid-1980s. In that time she has appeared in television series Heartbeat, Doctors and Sky One's Dream Team.

Her first television role was as teenager Jo Daly in Central Television's Midlands-based drama Boon between 1987 and 1989. She later played Juliette Bannerman in the ITV soap Families in 1993.

In 1997, Davies portrayed the controversial historical figure Diana Mitford (later Diana Mitford-Guinness and Lady Diana Mosley) in the biographical Channel Four mini-series Mosley.

In 2001, she also had a small role in Michael Apted's popular film Enigma. And in 2007 she was cast alongside David Morrissey, Lucy Cohu, and Tristan Gemmill in the short-lived Channel Four drama Cape Wrath, as regular character Abigail York.

In June 2008 it was announced that she would join Emmerdale as Anna De Souza. She made her debut on the soap on 8 July. However, on 15 October 2008, it was announced that Davies would be leaving the show at the end of 2008. With the upcoming departures of her onscreen father Donald De Souza (Michael Jayston), and onscreen fiancé Matthew King (Matt Healy) and the axing of her onscreen brother, Miles De Souza, Anna would have been left as a singular character with no family, so it was decided that her contract would not be renewed.

In an interview on ITV's chat show Loose Women on 12 December 2008, Davies announced that she would be starring alongside Laurence Fox, Matthew Macfadyen and Sally Hawkins in ITV's version of E. M. Forster's classic novel, A Passage To India. However, less than a week later, ITV confirmed that the adaption had been axed before filming even began due to "financial reasons".

Davies made her second appearance in the BBC drama Doctors starring alongside her father in an episode entitled "Toys" in which the pair played an estranged father and daughter.

In 2010 she made an appearance in an episode of the medical drama Holby City, playing a distressed lawyer.

== Selected Filmography ==
| Year | Title | Role | Notes |
|---|---|---|---|
| 1987 - 1989 | Boon | Jo Daly | 6 episodes |
| 1989 | Home James! | Chloe Brett | Episode: "Walking the Dog" |
| 1989 | Never the Twain | Young Woman | Episode: "Just the Ticket" |
| 1990 | Freddie and Max | Andrea | 1 episode |
| 1990 | Spatz | Cindy Stewart | Episode: "Death of a Spatzman" |
| 1991 | Bergerac | Amanda | Episode: "Snow in Provence" |
| 1991 | Cannon and Ball's Playhouse | Julia Parker Smith | Episode: "Free Every Friday" |
| 1992 | Family Pride | Melissa | 1 episode |
| 1992 - 1993 | Families | Juliette Bannerman | 100 episodes |
| 1994 | Law and Disorder | Susan | 6 episodes |
| 1994 | Just William | Clarinda | Episode: "William and the Russian Prince" |
| 1995 | Crown Prosecutor | Sarah Francis | 1 episode |
| 1995 | Queen of the East | Lady Emily | Film |
| 1998 | Heartbeat | Rachel Palmer | Episode: "Forbidden Fruit" |
| 1998 | Mosley | Diana Mitford Guinness | 2 episode (TV mini-series) |
| 1998 | The Mrs Bradley Mysteries | Hermione Bradley | Episode: "Speedy Death" |
| 1999 | Bernard's Watch | Patti | Episode: "Time Gentlemen" |
| 2001 | Enigma | Pamela | Film |
| 2002 - 2015 | Doctors | Alice Young/ Lorna Myers/ Tammy Cooper/ Antonia Harrison/ Pat Bowden | 5 episodes |
| 2003 | Cambridge Spies | Mrs Angleton | 1 episode (TV mini-series) |
| 2006 | Dream Team | Julie Rose | Episode: "War of the Roses" |
| 2007 | Cape Wrath | Abigail York | 7 episodes |
| 2008 - 2009 | Emmerdale | Anna De Souza | 60 episodes |
| 2010 | Garrow's Law | Lady Elizabeth Fox | 2 episodes |
| 2010 | Holby City | Pippa Robinson | Episode: "Shifts" |
| 2011 | Midsomer Murders | Lauren Hendred | Episode: "A Sacred Trust" |
| 2012 | Vexed | Elaine | 1 episode |
| 2014 | Law & Order: UK | Mary Sands | Episode: "Sale from Harm" |
| 2015 | EastEnders | Dr. Jo Mount | 1 episode |
| 2015 | Humans | Mrs. Kennedy | 1 episode |
| 2017 | Grantchester | Rosie Towler | 1 episode |
| 2017 | Holby City | Andrea Lawley | Episode: "Baggage" |
| 2019 | Casualty | Anna Norman | 1 episode |
| 2019 | The Hustle | Cathy | Film |
| 2022 - 2023 | Funny Woman | Beryl | 2 episodes |
| 2023 | Father Brown | Charlotte Goddard | Episode: "The Company of Men" |
| 2023 | Golda | Miss Epstein | Film |
| 2023 | Ted Lasso | Tish | Episode: "4-5-1" |
| 2025 | Silent Witness | Dr. Hannah Burns | Episode: "I Believe in Love (Part 2)" |
