= Matthew Wolfenden =

British actor (born 1980)

- Born: 5 May 1980 (age 46); Norwood Green, West Yorkshire, England
- Occupations: Actor; screenwriter
- Years active: 2004–present
- Television: Emmerdale
- Spouse: Charley Webb (m. 2018; sep. 2023)
- Children: 3

Matthew Wolfenden (born 5 May 1980) is an English actor and screenwriter, known for his role as David Metcalfe in the British soap opera Emmerdale.

== Early and personal life ==
Wolfenden was born in Norwood Green, West Yorkshire. He was educated at Brighouse High School. Wolfenden was a member of the British gymnastics squad until, aged 16, he fell whilst practising on the rings and broke his back. This prevented him from continuing gymnastics and he turned to acting.

Wolfenden was married to his Emmerdale co-star Charley Webb and the couple have three sons. Wolfenden proposed to Webb on Christmas Day in 2009. They married in February 2018, and have three sons together; their third son was born on 26 July 2019. They separated in September 2023.

In 2021, Wolfenden and Emmerdale co-star Isabel Hodgins were absent from the soap for three months following a "race row". The actors were accused of mocking the accent of a mixed race actress, as well as making an "inappropriate comment". They were allowed to return to the set from January 2022.

== Career ==
In 2006, Wolfenden was cast as David Metcalfe, son of Eric Pollard (Chris Chittell), in ITV's Emmerdale. His first acting job was as an extra on the programme, later he originally auditioned for the role of Eli Dingle, but lost out to Joseph Gilgun; then he was called back for the role of David Metcalfe.

Wolfenden has also appeared in Hollyoaks: Let Loose, a spin-off of Hollyoaks. In early 2007, Wolfenden finished ninth on the second series of Soapstar Superstar. He performed the songs "Bad Day" (Daniel Powter) and "Don't Stop Me Now" (Queen).

Wolfenden was partnered with Russian ice dancer Nina Ulanova for the seventh series of Dancing on Ice. His gymnastic and dance background proved to be an advantage and he ended up in the final, against Hollyoaks actress Jorgie Porter and The X Factor contestant Chico Slimani. Wolfenden continued his role in Emmerdale while training for Dancing on Ice. Wolfenden went on to win the series. In 2022, Wolfenden and Emmerdale co-star Roxy Shahidi were co-signed to United Agents as screenwriters. They collaborated on an episode of the BBC medical drama Holby City and three episodes of the BBC soap opera Doctors.

== Filmography ==
Year	Title	Role	Notes
2004	The Courtroom	Timmy Payne	Episode: "One Hit Wonder"
2005	Hollyoaks: Let Loose	Jason	1 episode
2006–2023	Emmerdale	David Metcalfe	Main Cast: 1,768 Episodes
2025	The Good Ship Murder	Nathan Dymond	1 episode
2026	Kate Expectations	Jonny	Short film
2026–	Hollyoaks	Jonah Keane	Regular role

== Awards and nominations ==
Year	Award	Category	Result	Ref.
2007	The British Soap Awards	Sexiest Male	Nominated	
2008	Digital Spy Soap Awards	Sexiest Male	Nominated	
2008	The British Soap Awards	Sexiest Male	Nominated	
2008	Inside Soap Awards	Sexiest Male	Nominated	
2009	The British Soap Awards	Sexiest Male	Nominated	
2012	The British Soap Awards	Sexiest Male	Shortlisted	
2012	Inside Soap Awards	Funniest Male	Nominated	
2012	Inside Soap Awards	Sexiest Male	Shortlisted	
2013	18th National Television Awards	Serial Drama Performance	Nominated	
2013	The British Soap Awards	Sexiest Male	Shortlisted	
2013	Inside Soap Awards	Sexiest Male	Shortlisted	
2014	The British Soap Awards	Sexiest Male	Shortlisted	
2015	Inside Soap Awards	Funniest Male	Nominated	
2016	TV Choice Awards	Best Soap Actor	Nominated	
2016	The British Soap Awards	Best Comedy Performance	Nominated	
2016	Inside Soap Awards	Best Actor	Nominated	
2016	Inside Soap Awards	Funniest Male	Shortlisted	
2017	22nd National Television Awards	Serial Drama Performance	Nominated	
2017	The British Soap Awards	Best Actor	Nominated	
2017	Inside Soap Awards	Sexiest Male	Shortlisted	
2019	TV Choice Awards	Best Soap Actor	Nominated	
2019	Inside Soap Awards	Best Actor	Nominated	
