= Ayden Callaghan =

British actor

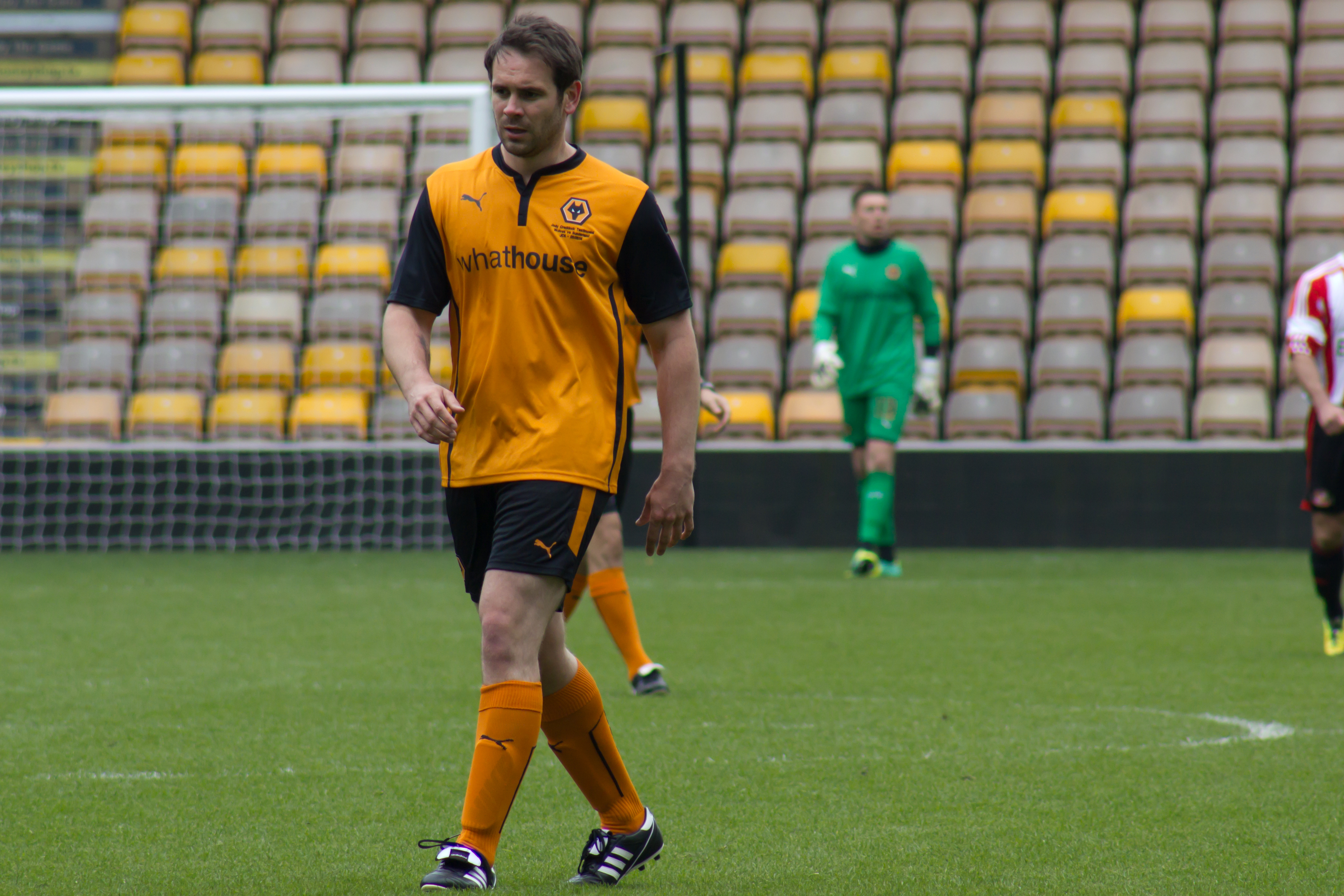
- Ayden Callaghan playing in Jody Craddock’s Testimonial match.
- Education: Guildford School of Acting
- Occupation: Actor
- Spouse: Sarah-Jane Honeywell
- Website: https://www.instagram.com/aydencallaghan?igsh=MW82OXF2cTYwNHY1aw%3D%3D&utm_source=qr

Ayden Callaghan is an English actor of stage and screen. He is best known for his roles as Miles De Souza in the soap opera Emmerdale from 2007 to 2008 and as Joe Roscoe in the soap opera Hollyoaks from 2013 to 2016. He also starred in EastEnders as a police officer in 2012 investigating Heather Trott's death (played by Cheryl Fergison).

== Career ==
Callaghan trained as an actor at the Guildford School of Acting and graduated in 2004 after a three-year course. He took on the stage name Ayden Callaghan when he started working as a professional actor.

Callaghan first rose to prominence in 2007 when he joined the cast of Emmerdale, playing the part of Miles De Souza. In an interview on the Emmerdale website, he commented on his on-screen persona: "Miles is like a lost little boy with lots of problems to work though", Callaghan told itv.com. "He's bordering on being an alcoholic and when you have a drink problem it's always there in the back of your mind, like a demon." Miles was written out of the soap in July 2008 without his character dying, allowing the possibility of a future return.

In 2013, Callaghan starred as Joe Roscoe on the Channel 4 soap opera Hollyoaks. The Roscoes were one of the most popular families to join the soap and the year after they joined Hollyoaks won 'Best Soap' at the Soap Awards for the first time in its nineteen years. While in Hollyoaks, Callaghan appeared on the front cover of a charity edition of Gay Times.

== Personal life ==
Callaghan is married to television presenter, actress and blogger Sarah-Jane Honeywell.
