= Hayley Tamaddon =

British actress and dancer

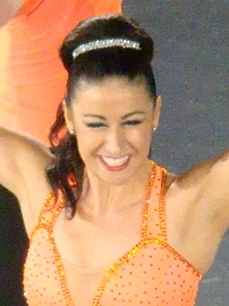
- Tamaddon on the Dancing on Ice Tour in 2011
- Born: Hayley Soraya Tamaddon; 24 January 1977 (age 49); Bispham, Blackpool, Lancashire, England
- Occupation: Actress
- Years active: 1997–present
- Television: Emmerdale (2005–2007); Dancing on Ice (2010, 2014); Coronation Street (2013–2015)
- Children: 1
- Website: Official website (archived)

Hayley Soraya Tamaddon (born 24 January 1977) is a British actress. She is known for her roles in the ITV soap operas as Del Dingle in Emmerdale and Andrea Beckett in Coronation Street.

Tamaddon won the fifth series of Dancing on Ice on 28 March 2010, with skating partner Daniel Whiston. She returned with Whiston for the ninth series in 2014, which saw many of the previous winners and favourites from the show compete.

== Background ==
Tamaddon was born to an Iranian father and English mother. She attended Montgomery High School in Blackpool. Tamaddon trained in dance at Phil Winston's Theatreworks and Laine Theatre Arts.

== Career ==
=== Stage ===
Tamaddon has appeared in a number of theatre roles including Frenchie in Grease and Diana Morales in A Chorus Line. She has also appeared in Boogie Nights opposite actor/comedian Kev Orkian, Mamma Mia! and Fame as well as playing Janet in the 2007 United Kingdom tour of The Rocky Horror Show. Tamaddon has shared the role of the Lady of the Lake with Jodie Prenger and Amy Nuttall in the UK Tour of Spamalot.

Tamaddon has also appeared in pantomimes including Aladdin and Snow White. In December 2007, she played the Fairy godmother in Cinderella at the Lyceum Theatre in Sheffield, and in 2008 performed the title role in Cinderella at the Alhambra Theatre in Bradford. She returned to the Lyceum Theatre in the production of Peter Pan, opposite Nigel Planer's Captain Hook. Tamaddon also played Sleeping Beauty in Sleeping Beauty from 14 December 2011 to 15 January 2012 at the Theatre Royal in Norwich. In 2016 she embarked on a UK national tour of Chicago, starring as Roxie Hart. In March 2018, she began as Millie Dillmount in the UK Tour of Thoroughly Modern Millie. Tamaddon also played the role of Miss Hedge in the West End musical Everybody's Talking About Jamie for a limited run in 2019.

=== Television ===
Tamaddon played Delilah Dingle in soap opera Emmerdale from 2005 to 2007. Her first episode was aired on 15 July 2005.

Tamaddon was written out of Emmerdale in the summer of 2007 when series producer, Kathleen Beedles decided not to renew her contract but promised not to kill off the character of Delilah Dingle – leaving the door open for a possible return at some point in the future. Tamaddon has also appeared in The Royal, Where The Heart Is, Ghosthunting with the Dingles, as Lulu on Celebrity Stars in Their Eyes, Loose Women and This Morning.

In March 2007, Tamaddon appeared on Soapstar Superchef. She and her team-mate Mathew Bose, who co-stars with her as Paul Lambert, in Emmerdale, were crowned winners of the show on 13 April. She has also played the role of a nurse in The Royal Today.

Tamaddon appeared on week 18 of the BBC children's television show, Hider in the House on 4 May 2008, which was filmed at a family household in Wortley, West Yorkshire. She was busted on challenge seven but said "Personally I think I have been one of the best hiders ever and it's been really good fun."

Tamaddon appeared in Channel 4's Shameless as Calista, a lesbian who has a one-night stand with Karen Maguire. She also appeared in Waterloo Road as Zoe.

Tamaddon was crowned champion of the fifth series of Dancing on Ice, where she skated with professional skater and childhood friend Daniel Whiston. Competing over 12 weeks in front of 10 million viewers, including their Jai Ho routine, she reached the final against Hollyoaks actor Kieron Richardson who came third, and Gary Lucy with whom she went head-to head in the Bolero. Tamaddon won the trophy with over 80% of the public vote and went on tour with Torvill and Dean.

On 25 September 2010, Tamaddon appeared on an episode of All Star Family Fortunes.

In October 2013, it was announced that Tamaddon would be joining Coronation Street as Andrea Beckett, a friend of Steve McDonald (Simon Gregson) and rival of Michelle Connor (Kym Marsh). She made her first appearance on 23 December 2013. Tamaddon and her character exited the soap opera in September 2015 alongside co-star Craig Charles who played Andrea's boyfriend Lloyd Mullaney.

==== Soapstar Superstar ====
Tamaddon was runner-up in ITV's Soapstar Superstar which led to her singing with Michael Ball at the Opera House in Blackpool in March 2007 during his tour. For finishing second she raised £25,000 for Brian House Children's Hospice in Bispham.

=== Radio ===
Tamaddon has appeared on 96.3 Radio Aire in Leeds. Her first appearance was on the breakfast show in October 2009, when she presented with presenter Paul 'Griffo' Griffiths, who was covering for Jason King and Joel Ross. She then spent a further week on the show, and in November once again covered with Griffo.

Tamaddon currently presents a Monday to Friday daytime show called Daytimes with Hayley Tamaddon on Coastal Radio DAB, a radio station covering the Blackpool area.

=== Film ===
Tamaddon appeared in a short film in June 2008 promoting road safety to young people in Cheshire. The film was made in conjunction with the Cheshire Constabulary and the Cheshire Safer Roads Partnership.

It was announced in May 2017 Tamaddon would appear in comedy feature Eaten by Lions alongside Antonio Aakeel and Jack Carroll, directed by Jason Wingard.

== Filmography ==
=== Television ===
Year	Title	Role	Notes
2004	Where the Heart Is	Nurse	Episode: "Body & Soul"
2005	The Royal	Rosie	Episode: "The Way We Were"
2005–2007	Emmerdale	Del Dingle	Regular role; 213 episodes
2006	Stars in Their Eyes	Herself	Contestant; winner
2007	Soapstar Superstar	Herself	Contestant; runner-up
2007	Soapstar Superchef	Herself	Contestant; winner
2008	The Royal Today	Alison Garson	Series 1: Episode 24
2008	Hider in the House	Herself	Participant
2009	Shameless	Calista	Episode: "Trouble in Paradise"
2010	Dancing on Ice	Herself	Contestant; winner
2010	Waterloo Road	Zoe	Series 5: Episode 19
2010	All Star Family Fortunes	Herself	Contestant
2011	This Morning	Herself	Dancing on Ice correspondent
2011	Ten Mile Menu	Herself	Contestant
2012	Accused	Leanne	Episode: "Mo's Story"
2013–2015	Coronation Street	Andrea Beckett	Regular role; 148 episodes
2014	Dancing on Ice	Herself	Contestant; all stars; runner-up
2014	This Morning	Herself	Guest
2014	Tipping Point: Lucky Stars	Herself	Contestant
2015	Celebrity Squares	Herself	Guest
2015	Celebrity Juice	Herself	Guest
2018	Eaten by Lions	Sara	Film
2019	The Chase	Herself	Contestant
2021	At Home With Hayley	Herself	Guest
2022	Fame in the Family	Herself	Celebrity dinner party host
2023	Unforgotten	Judy Mexbury	2 episodes
2025	Pictionary	Herself	Series 1, Episode 16
2025	Pushers	Kayla	Series 1, Episode 5
2025	The High Street Shops We Loved & Lost	Narrator	Series 1, Episodes 1 and 2
2026	Betrayal	Fatimah Feyzi	Series 1

== Theatre credits ==
Year	Title	Role	Notes
1997–1998	Fame	Various	Cambridge Theatre; UK Tour
2001	Mamma Mia!	Lisa	Prince Edward Theatre
2002	Boogie Nights	Trish	Bradford Alhambra
2003	A Chorus Line	Diana Morales	Sheffield Crucible
2007	The Rocky Horror Show	Janet Weiss	UK Tour
2007–2008	Grease	Frenchie	UK Tour
2008–2009	Cinderella	Cinderella	Bradford Alhambra
2010	Spamalot	Lady of the Lake	UK Tour
2011–2012	Sleeping Beauty	Princess Aurora	Theatre Royal, Norwich
2012–2013	Jack and the Beanstalk	The Princess	Forum Theatre, Billingham
2016	Chicago	Roxie Hart	UK Tour
2017–2018	Aladdin	Princess Jasmine	Bristol Hippodrome
2018	Thoroughly Modern Millie	Millie	Richmond Theatre
2018–2019	Aladdin	Princess Jasmine	Palace Theatre, Newark
2019	Everybody's Talking About Jamie	Miss Hedge	Apollo Theatre
2021–2022	Cinderella	Fairy Godmother	Pavilion Theatre, Rhyl
2022–2023	Sleeping Beauty	Good Fairy	Grand Theatre, Blackpool

== Personal life ==
Tamaddon was engaged to Darren Charles, a dancer and choreographer from Grimsby but called off the wedding after he admitted having cheated on her whilst she was filming Dancing on Ice. In the press, she later ruled out any possibility of a reconciliation. She was in a relationship with comedian Marcus Brigstocke, with whom she had worked on Spamalot in 2010, leading to his divorce from his wife Sophie.

In June 2014, Tamaddon was admitted to hospital after the pressure of working on Coronation Street and the Dancing on Ice tour became too much for her.
