= Abid Khan =

Abid Khan may refer to:

- Abid Khan (actor) (1953–2000), Pakistani comedian and actor
- Abid Khan (director), British film director
- Ghulam Abid Khan (born 1972), Pakistani politician
