= Jennifer Caron Hall =

English actress, singer-songwriter, and artist (born 1958)

- Born: 21 September 1958 (age 68); London, England
- Occupations: Actress, director, producer
- Spouses: Alex Clive (m. 1984; div. 1989) Glenn Wilhide (m. 1996)
- Children: 1
- Parents: Sir Peter Hall; Leslie Caron
- Relatives: Christopher Hall (brother); Edward Hall (half-brother); Rebecca Hall (half-sister)
- Website: shakefestival.com, jennycloth.com

Jennifer Caron Hall (born 21 September 1958; also known as Jenny Wilhide) is an English theatre director, producer and actress.

In 2019 she founded SHAKE Festival, a performing arts company and Shakespeare festival based in Suffolk, UK.

== Producer and Director ==
During the pandemic she produced a rehearsed reading of Shakespeare’s The Tempest, starring Geraldine James as Prospero and her sister Rebecca Hall as Ariel. The cast also included Robert Hands, Antonio Aakeel, Lauryn Canny and Aidan Cheng. She followed this with an online reading of A Midsummer Night’s Dream starring Dan Stevens as Oberon and her sister Rebecca Hall as Titania, with newcomer Máiréad Tyers as Hermia and Luisa Omielan as Bottom the Weaver.

In September 2025 she produced and directed a five venue tour of Akenfield, in rural Suffolk. This was the first stage adaptation of Ronald Blythe’s rural masterpiece of 1967, which she commissioned from her husband Glenn Wilhide. The cast was made up of local people with authentic Suffolk voices. The set was designed by Suffolk-born sculptor Laurence Edwards and among the cast was Helen Shand, wife of Garrow Shand, a farmer who starred in the 1974 film of Akenfield directed by her father, Peter Hall.

In January 2025 Hall produced a rehearsed reading of The Scapegoat: Flight to Spain, abridged for SHAKE Festival by Lucy Hughes-Hallett from her 2024 biography of George Villiers, 1st Duke of Buckingham. The cast was Alex Jennings, Juliet Stephenson and Suffolk born newcomer Xander Ridge, and the reading took place at The Tabernacle, Notting Hill in London.

== Early life ==
Hall was educated at Arden House nursery school Henley-in-Arden, Warwickshire, the Lycée Français Charles de Gaulle, Bedales School and Newnham College, Cambridge, where she read English. She grew up in Stratford upon Avon, London, Los Angeles, Oxfordshire, Sussex, Burgundy and Paris.

== Actress ==
At the National Theatre in London, Hall played Helena in A Midsummer Night's Dream directed by Bill Bryden in 1982–1983, starring Paul Scofield and Susan Fleetwood as Oberon and Titania. This was the first ever production of Shakespeare in the Cottesloe Theatre (now renamed the Dorfman Theatre) and transferred to the Lyttelton in 1983. While Hall continued to play Helena, Scofield was replaced by Sir Robert Stephens and Brenda Blethyn joined the cast as Hermia.

In the BBC's 1996 television adaptation of Rumer Godden's novel The Peacock Spring, Hall played Alix Lamont, a character of half-Indian, half-European descent. She also narrated the Macmillan Audio Book of the novel. Caron Hall also appeared in The Love Boat, alongside her mother in an hour-and-a-half special entitled 'The Christmas Cruise’ and as Princess Betsy in a 1997 film of Anna Karenina starring Sean Bean and Sophie Marceau.

== Other Work ==
Hall produces hand woven scarves and shawls, using some hand-spun wools and natural fibres, in a studio in Suffolk, UK, which she sells under the name Jenny Cloth.

Hall was signed to Warner Bros. Records in Los Angeles, and as Jennifer Hall released the album Fortune and Men's Eyes in 1987. Her song "Ice Cream Days" appears on the Bright Lights, Big City: Original Motion Picture Soundtrack.

Self-portrait by Jennifer Caron Hall.

In 2009, Hall began painting on her iPhone and exhibiting on a blog, The Blue Biro Gallery. Her digitally enhanced self-portrait was featured in Vogue. In 2012, the Theatre Royal in Bath commissioned her to paint a portrait of her father in oil. In 2013, she had a solo show at the Serena Moreton Gallery in London.

For some years she worked as a freelance arts journalist writing under the name Jenny Wilhide, in titles such as the Evening Standard and The Spectator.

Alongside arts journalism she ran a boutique PR agency called Claude Communications, publicising clients in the Design, Lighting and Travel sectors.

== Bibliography ==
- WGBH (1997). Peacock Spring: Program Description. Masterpiece Theatre, 1997. Retrieved from .
- Mulryne, J.R.; Shewring, Margaret; Barnes, Jason; Mulryne, Ronnie (1999). "The Cottesloe at the National: Infinite Riches in a Little Room" (book). Mulryne & Shewring Ltd, 1999.
