= List of films banned in Pakistan =

Pakistan started banning films in 1962, with restrictions tightened in 1979 when Zia-ul-Haq implemented an Islamization agenda and an even stricter censorship code. A ban on Indian films (which had been in place since 1965 but was not always strictly enforced) was lifted in 2008, with the compromise that cinemas in Pakistan must equally share screening time between Indian and Pakistani films, but was later enforced again in 2019.

== 2006 ==
Date	Movie Name	Country	Film Industry	The Reason Banned
2006	The Da Vinci Code	(United States)	Hollywood	Banned due to protest by the Christian community in Pakistan.

== 2010 ==
Date	Movie Name	Country	Film Industry	The Reason Banned
2010	Lahore	(India)	Bollywood	Banned as the censor board objected to some dialogues and scenes in the film.
2010	Tere Bin Laden	(India)	Bollywood	Banned for fear that the title could be misconstrued by Islamist extremists as a reason to attack.

== 2011 ==
Date	Movie Name	Country	Film Industry	The Reason Banned
2011	Slackistan	(United Kingdom)	Independent	Director refused to make cuts requested by the Central Board of Film Censors.
2011	The Dirty Picture	(India)	Bollywood	Banned by authorities. However, it was later cleared for release only a week after the Indian premiere.
2011	Delhi Belly	(India)	Bollywood	Not allowed to be screened by the censor board.

== 2012 ==
Date	Movie Name	Country	Film Industry	The Reason Banned
2012	Ek Tha Tiger	(India)	Bollywood	It was not released in Pakistan, due to concerns over the portrayal of Pakistan in the film.
2012	Khiladi 786	(India)	Bollywood	Renamed as Khiladi for release but promos and ads of the film were banned in Pakistan.
2012	Agent Vinod	(India)	Bollywood	For controversial references to the Inter-Services Intelligence spy agency.

== 2013 ==
Date	Movie Name	Country	Film Industry	The Reason Banned
2013	Bhaag Milkha Bhaag	(India)	Bollywood	Banned for portraying Pakistani sports authorities negatively.
2013	Raanjhanaa	(India)	Bollywood	Banned for depicting a love affair between a Hindu and a Muslim.
2013	G.I. Joe: Retaliation	(United States)	Hollywood	Banned due to the film's depiction of Pakistan as an unstable state and the fictional portrayal of a "foreign invasion of Pakistan’s nuclear installations".
2013	The Line of Freedom	(United Kingdom)	British	Banned due to the controversial depiction of Pakistani security forces during the Insurgency in Balochistan, which led to a nationwide ban on the Internet Movie Database.

== 2014 ==
Date	Movie Name	Country	Film Industry	The Reason Banned
2014	Children of War	(India)	Bollywood	Banned for its portrayal of the 1971 Bangladesh Liberation War contrary to Pakistan's view.
2014	Haider	(India)	Bollywood	Banned as it depicts the Kashmir insurgency, a sensitive issue in the country.
2014	Noah	(United States)	Hollywood	Banned due to the portrayal of Noah by an actor.

== 2015 ==
Date	Movie Name	Country	Film Industry	The Reason Banned
2015	Calendar Girls	(India)	Bollywood	Banned by Pakistan due to objections to one of the dialogues in the film.
2015	Phantom	(India)	Bollywood	Demanded to be banned by Hafiz Saeed's Jamaat-ud-Dawa. Phantom is about 2008 Mumbai attacks based on the book Mumbai Avengers by S. Hussain Zaidi. The Lahore High Court banned the movie on 20 August 2015 as Government of Pakistan wanted the petition by Hafiz Saeed to be dismissed due to its uselessness and the government doesn't want to be involved unnecessarily because no one in Pakistan asked for NOC to screen the film. LHC judge Justice Shahid Bilal Hassan asked the government what it could do to stop the movie CDs from being sold in the market after the ban.
2015	Baby	(India)	Bollywood	Banned for depicting Muslims as terrorists.
2015	Bangistan	(India)	Bollywood	Banned for depicting Muslims as terrorists.

== 2016 ==
Date	Movie Name	Country	Film Industry	The Reason Banned
2016	Dishoom	(India)	Bollywood	Banned for portraying the India–Pakistan cricket rivalry in a negative light.
2016	Udta Punjab	(India)	Bollywood	Banned due to abusive language usage.
2016	Shivaay	(India)	Bollywood	Banned for referencing the India-Pakistan border conflict.
2016	Ae Dil Hai Mushkil	(India)	Bollywood	Banned for referencing the India-Pakistan border conflict.
2016	Neerja	(India)	Bollywood	Banned for allegedly showing Pakistan in a negative light, a fact denied by Sonam Kapoor, who portrays slain flight attendant Neerja Bhanot in the film.
2016	Ambarsariya	(India)	Pollywood	Banned due to direct references to Indian intelligence agency R&AW inside the movie.

== 2017 ==
Date	Movie Name	Country	Film Industry	The Reason Banned
2017	Viceroy's House	(United Kingdom)	British	Banned for allegedly misrepresenting Muhammad Ali Jinnah (Founder Of Pakistan).
2017	Tubelight	(India)	Bollywood	Banned to prevent hampering the release of local films
2017	Tiger Zinda Hai	(India)	Bollywood	The film was not given a No Objection Certificate by the Central Board of Film Censors in Pakistan, stating the reason as "The image of Pakistan and its law enforcement agencies" has been compromised.
2017	Dangal	(India)	Bollywood	Banned when actor-producer Aamir Khan refused the Pakistan Censor Board's demand to remove scenes with the Indian National Flag and Indian National Anthem.
2017	Naam Shabana	(India)	Bollywood	Banned because it portrays Pakistan in "bad taste".
2017	Jolly LLB 2	(India)	Bollywood	Banned because the film makes references to the Kashmir issue.
2017	Raees	(India)	Bollywood	Banned due to its "objectionable" content, as "the content undermines Islam, and a specific religious sect, (It also) portrays some Muslims as criminals, wanted persons, and terrorists".

== 2018 ==
Date	Movie Name	Country	Film Industry	The Reason Banned
2018	Pad Man	(India)	Bollywood	The Central Board of Film Censors, Pakistan, refused to give a No Objection Certificate to the film and said, "we cannot allow a film whose name, subject, and story are not acceptable yet in our society." They disallowed the Pakistani film distributors IMGC and HKC to purchase the film rights and stated that they were "ruining Islamic traditions, history, and culture."
2018	Pari	(India)	Bollywood	Promotes black magic.
2018	Raazi	(India)	Bollywood	Showed an intelligence agent who spied on Pakistan for India.
2018	Gold	(India)	Bollywood	For fears regarding the depiction of the Partition of India.
2018	Veere Di Wedding	(India)	Bollywood	For depicting obscenity and vulgar dialogues by female characters.
2018	Mulk	(India)	Bollywood	The movie shows an Indian Muslim family accused of treason and ties with the Pakistanis.
2018	Aiyaary	(India)	Bollywood	Banned for portraying Pakistan in a negative light.
2018	Race 3	(India)	Bollywood	Ban imposed so that four big banner Pakistani films and other smaller regional language releases on Eid do good business without competition from Bollywood movies.
2018	Parmanu: The Story of Pokhran	(India)	Bollywood	Banned for references to Pakistan's nuclear tests and establishments.

== 2019-present ==
Since February 2019, Pakistan has banned the screening of all Indian films amid border tensions between the countries.

Date	Movie Name	Country	Film Industry	The Reason Banned
2022	I'll Meet You There	United States	Hollywood	For "negatively depicting" Muslim and Pakistani culture.
2022	The Lady of Heaven	United Kingdom	British	For negatively depicting important Muslim figures and portraying historical inaccuracies.

== See also ==
- Jaal movement, 1954 protest in West Pakistan to ban Indian films
- Maalik (2016 film), Pakistani film banned by the federal government, released after the supreme court intervened
