= The Hungry =

2017 film

- Film poster
- Directed by: Bornila Chatterjee
- Based on: Titus Andronicus by William Shakespeare
- Starring: Naseeruddin Shah; Tisca Chopra; Antonio Aakeel; Neeraj Kabi
- Cinematography: Nick Cooke
- Music by: Benedict Taylor
- Release date: 7 September 2017 (TIFF)
- Countries: India; United Kingdom
- Language: Hindi

The Hungry is a 2017 Indian drama film directed by Bornila Chatterjee. It was filmed by London-based cinematographer Nick Cooke. It was screened in the Special Presentations section at the 2017 Toronto International Film Festival and is a modern adaptation of Titus Andronicus by William Shakespeare.

== Cast ==
- Naseeruddin Shah as Tathagat Ahuja (representing Titus)
- Tisca Chopra as Tulsi Joshi (representing Tamora)
- Antonio Aakeel as Chirag Joshi
- Neeraj Kabi as Arun Kumar (representing Aaron)
- Sayani Gupta as Loveleen Ahuja (representing Lavinia)
- Arjun Gupta as Sunny Ahuja
- Suraj Sharma as Ankur Joshi
- Jayant Kripalani as Poddaar
