= Quintessa Swindell =

American actor (born 1997)

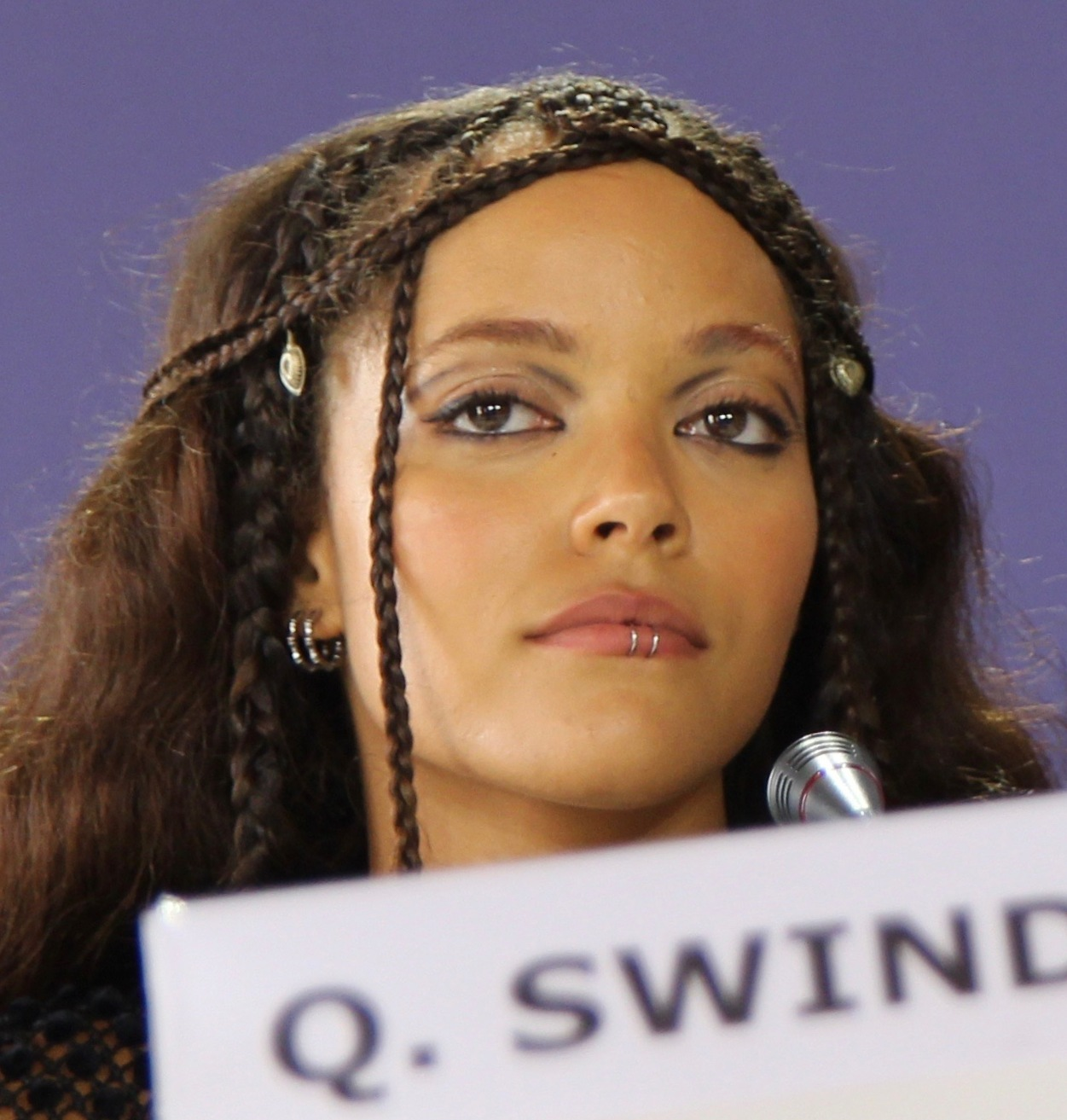
- Swindell in 2022
- Born: February 8, 1997 (age 29); New York City, U.S.
- Occupation: Actor
- Years active: 2019–present

Quintessa Swindell (born February 8, 1997) is an American actor who starred as Tabitha Foster in the Netflix teen drama Trinkets and as Maxine Hunkel / Cyclone in the 2022 superhero film Black Adam. They also had a brief appearance as Anna in the HBO series Euphoria.

== Early life ==
Swindell grew up in Virginia Beach, Virginia and attended high school at the Governor's School for the Arts in Norfolk, Virginia. Swindell was raised by a single father and had difficulty fitting in for reasons of gender and race.

== Career ==
Swindell's debut in 2019 was as Anna in the HBO television series Euphoria in the episode "The Trials and Tribulations of Trying To Pee While Depressed". The same year, Swindell had a main role in the Netflix teen drama Trinkets as Tabitha Foster. Swindell has a role in the film Voyagers starring Colin Farrell and Tye Sheridan. In December 2020, they were cast in the role of Cyclone in the DCEU film Black Adam, starring Dwayne Johnson in the title role. They also appeared as Laila in season four of the HBO series In Treatment, which aired in 2021. Swindell starred in Master Gardener alongside Joel Edgerton and Sigourney Weaver.

== Personal life ==
Swindell is nonbinary and uses they/he pronouns. Swindell has said that due to not fitting stereotypes about all nonbinary people being androgynous, it has been difficult to find roles acting their self-identified gender. However, Swindell was happy to play a cisgender girl in Trinkets, given that the show explores Black identity, which spoke to them as a result of their experience being biracial.

== Filmography ==
=== Film ===
Year	Title	Role	Notes
2021	Voyagers	Julie	
2021	Granada Nights	Amelia	
2022	Master Gardener	Maya	
2022	Black Adam	Maxine Hunkel / Cyclone	
2026	Teenage Sex and Death at Camp Miasma	Julie	
2026	One Night Only	Arya	
TBA	Deep Cuts †		Filming
TBA	4 X 4: The Event †		Post-production

=== Television ===
Year	Title	Role	Notes
2019	Euphoria	Anna	Episode: "The Trials and Tribulations of Trying to Pee While Depressed"
2019–2020	Trinkets	Tabitha Foster	Main role
2021	In Treatment	Laila	Main role (season 4)
2025	Prime Target	Taylah Sanders	Main role
TBA	The Watcher		Main role (season 2)

== Awards and nominations ==
Award	Year	Category	Nominated work	Result	Ref.
Black Reel Awards	2023	Outstanding Breakthrough Performance, Male	Black Adam	Nominated	
