= Master Gardener (film) =

2022 American film directed by Paul Schrader

- Theatrical release poster
- Directed by: Paul Schrader
- Written by: Paul Schrader
- Produced by: Amanda Crittenden; David Gonzales; Scott LaStaiti
- Starring: Joel Edgerton; Sigourney Weaver; Quintessa Swindell; Esai Morales
- Cinematography: Alexander Dynan
- Edited by: Benjamin Rodriguez Jr.
- Music by: Devonté Hynes
- Production companies: HanWay Films; Flickstar; Ottocento Films; Northern Lights; KOJO Studios
- Distributed by: Magnolia Pictures
- Release dates: September 3, 2022 (Venice); May 19, 2023 (United States)
- Running time: 111 minutes
- Country: United States
- Language: English
- Budget: $4.1 million
- Box office: $1.4 million

Master Gardener is a 2022 American crime thriller film written and directed by Paul Schrader. It follows Narvel Roth (Joel Edgerton), a horticulturist for the wealthy Mrs. Haverhill (Sigourney Weaver), as he faces his violent past.

The film had its world premiere out of competition of the 79th Venice International Film Festival on September 3, 2022. It was theatrically released in the United States by Magnolia Pictures on May 19, 2023, it received positive reviews.

== Plot ==
Narvel Roth is the meticulous horticulturist of Gracewood Gardens, a beautiful estate owned by wealthy dowager Mrs. Haverhill. Haunted by his past, Roth finds solace in ritualistic journaling and the fine details of gardening, which he describes as "a belief in the future".

Mrs. Haverhill (with whom Roth has been having a sexual relationship) orders Roth to take on her recently orphaned grandniece, Maya, as an apprentice so that she can eventually take over the Gardens and keep it "in the family". Though she is resistant to the training, and her relationship with Mrs. Haverhill remains strained, Maya and Roth eventually grow close. When Maya is assaulted by her drug dealer, R.G., Roth has his case agent intimidate him. Maya attempts to seduce Roth, but he rebuffs her when she tries to take off his shirt (since his shirt hides tattoos that he is trying not to show). Mrs. Haverhill spies Roth leaving Maya's room, and, spurned, fires them both. Roth and Maya decide to leave together, stopping first at Maya's apartment, where she gets high one last time and Roth intimidates R.G. and his friend Sissy.

After a few days on the road, Roth begins to open up to Maya and removes his shirt in their motel room, his white supremacist tattoos shocking Maya (unbeknownst to his team of gardeners, Roth is a former white supremacist in witness protection, having betrayed his former associates after refusing to kill a black preacher's wife and daughter). When Maya asks if Roth will have the tattoos removed, he says yes. They have sex for the first time that night.

Roth soon receives a call that the Gardens have been vandalized. They return to view the damage. Maya guesses it was R.G. and Sissy retaliating. Roth checks in on Mrs. Haverhill, whom he disarms of a (WWII) trophy Luger used to protect the house. That night, Roth and Maya go to settle matters with R.G. and Sissy, breaking up a party house with gunshots. Roth gives his gun to Maya to kill them, but she decides against it. Roth instead breaks their legs.

Roth returns to Gracewood Gardens and lays out three points for Mrs. Haverhill: Returning her father's Luger, restoring the gardens to their beauty, and that he and Maya will be living together "as husband and wife", which Mrs. Haverhill calls "obscene". Haverhill vindictively takes aim at Roth, but the Luger isn't loaded, causing Haverhill to relent and let him go. Roth and Maya dance on the porch of his cabin in the Gardens.

== Cast ==
- Joel Edgerton as Narvel Roth / Norton Rupplea
- Sigourney Weaver as Norma Haverhill
- Quintessa Swindell as Maya Core
- Esai Morales as Oscar Neruda
- Eduardo Losan as Xavier
- Victoria Hill as Isobel Phelps
- Amy Le as Janine
- Erika Ashley as Maggie
- Jared Bankens as R.G.
- Matt Mercurio as Sissy
- Rick Cosnett as Stephen Collins

== Production ==
It was announced in September 2021 that Joel Edgerton and Sigourney Weaver had been cast in the film, written and directed by Paul Schrader. Filming began in Louisiana on February 3, 2022, and was scheduled to take place in the St. Francisville area through early March. On February 8, it was announced that two more actors joined the cast, Quintessa Swindell (replacing Zendaya, whom Schrader originally had in mind), and Esai Morales.

The film’s central setting, the estate of Gracewood Gardens, was created as a composite of multiple real locations in St. Francisville and surrounding West Feliciana Parish, Louisiana. The production made extensive use of the formal gardens at Rosedown Plantation.

== Release ==
Master Gardener had its world premiere out of competition at the 79th Venice International Film Festival on September 3, 2022. The film had a limited theatrical release in the United States by Magnolia Pictures on May 19, 2023. It was released digitally by Magnolia Home Entertainment on June 6, 2023.

== Reception ==
=== Box office ===
Master Gardener grossed $667,114 in North America and $761,481 in other territories, for a total worldwide of $1.4 million, against a production budget of $4 million.

=== Critical response ===
On the review aggregator website Rotten Tomatoes, 71% of 184 critics' reviews are positive, with an average rating of 6.5/10. The website's consensus reads: "Master Gardener suggests Paul Schrader might need to find a new patch of creative soil to till, but some strong performances make it difficult to dismiss." Metacritic, which uses a weighted average, assigned the film a score of 63 out of 100, based on 45 critics, indicating "generally favorable" reviews.

=== Accolades ===
Weaver was nominated for the Florida Film Critics Circle Award for Best Supporting Actress. "Space and Time", written by S.G. Goodman and performed by Mereba, was nominated for Original Song – Independent Film at the 14th Hollywood Music in Media Awards.
