= Fortune and Men's Eyes (album) =

Studio album by Jennifer Hall
- Released: December 1987
- Recorded: RG Jones, London
- Genre: New wave, synthpop, pop rock
- Length: 38:13
- Label: Warner Bros.
- Producer: Alan Tarney

Singles from Fortune and Men's Eyes
- 1. "Danger Men at Work" Released: 1987; 2. "Ice Cream Days" Released: 1988

Professional ratings
Review scores
Source	Rating
People	(no rating)

Fortune and Men's Eyes is the debut album from Jennifer Hall and was released in 1987. The song "Ice Cream Days" also appears on the soundtrack of the film Bright Lights, Big City.

== Album title ==
The title is taken from William Shakespeare's Sonnet 29 which begins with the line "When in disgrace with fortune and men's eyes".

== Track listing ==
=== LP: 1-25628 / CD: 9 25628-2 ===
All tracks are written by Jennifer Hall and Alan Tarney, except where noted

No.	Title	Writer(s)	Length
1.	"Danger Men at Work"		3:34
2.	"Luke"		3:53
3.	"February"	Jennifer Hall, Steve Warwick	3:41
4.	"No Good"		4:03
5.	"Ice Cream Days"		4:39
6.	"Car Wash"		3:44
7.	"Atlas"		3:20
8.	"Cat Walking"	Hall	4:02
9.	"Dance with Me"	Hall	4:05
10.	"Mastery"		3:12
Total length:			38:13

== Personnel ==
- Jennifer Hall – Vocals
- Alan Tarney – Guitar, Keyboards, Programming

Backing vocals

- Tessa Niles (1, 2, 3, 5, 6, 7)
- Alan Tarney (1, 4, 8, 9, 10)

Production

- Alan Tarney – Producer
- Gerry W. Kitchingham – Recording Engineer
- John Hudson – Mixing engineer

Recorded at RG Jones, Wimbledon. Mixed at Mayfair Studios, London

Artwork

- Robert Erdmann – Front cover photo
- Philippe Costes – Back cover photo
- Jeri Heiden – Art direction
- Kim Champagne – Design
- Two Guys from Melbourne – Front cover type
