= The Manageress =

British television series

- Starring: Cherie Lunghi; Warren Clarke
- Theme music composer: Michael Kamen
- Country of origin: United Kingdom
- Original language: English
- No. of series: 2
- No. of episodes: 12

Production
- Producers: Glenn Wilhide; Sophie Belhetchet
- Running time: 60mins

Original release
- Network: Channel 4
- Release: 11 June 1989 – 27 May 1990

The Manageress is a television series about a woman who becomes manager of a professional football team. It ran from 1989 to 1990 and had two seasons. The series starred Cherie Lunghi as Gabriella Benson and Warren Clarke as the chairman of the second division club. It was independently produced for Channel 4 by Glenn Wilhide and Sophie Balhetchet at their production company, ZED Ltd. It was written by Stan Hey and Neville Smith and directed by Christopher King. The series aired for two series of six episodes on Channel 4 in 1989 and 1990.

The first-season episodes were published by Penguin Books in novel form in 1989. The author was named as Stan Hey.

The series was dubbed into French for French television and the title was translated as Miss Manager et ses footballeurs. German title was Unser Boss ist eine Frau.

== Cast ==
- Cherie Lunghi – Gabriella Benson
- Warren Clarke – Martin Fisher
- Tom Georgeson – Eddie Johnson
- Adam Bareham – Anthony Coombs
- Paul Clarkson – Keith Nicholl
- Glyn Grimstead – Trevor Coughlan
- Chris Walker – Brian Rimmer
- Paul Geoffrey – Simon Benson
- David Cheesman – Charlie O'Keefe
- Robbie Gee – Tony Morris
- Mark Adams – Perry Gardner
- James Garbutt – Cedric Deness
- Alan Rowe – Charles Edwards
- David Sibley – Steve Simms
- Jill Johnson – Marjorie
- Shay Gorman – Norman Williams
- Mark Haddigan – Dave McGregor
- Mark McGann – Gary Halliwell
- Stephen Tompkinson – Jim Wilson
- Joe Dixon – Terry Moir
- Patrick Drury – Mark Sadler
- Gavin Kitchen – Kevin Hedworth
- Anthony Trent – Ken Allen
- Paul McKenzie – Paul Kennedy

== Episodes ==
=== Season one ===
1. A Man's Game
2. Fit
3. The Management Reserves the Right
4. Collapsible Brollies
5. One of Us
6. Home and Away

=== Season two ===
1. Doing the Business
2. Pingvin Lakrids
3. Steal Your Heart Away
4. A Hundred and Ten Percent
5. A Match for Anyone
6. At the End of the Day
