= The Contract (2016 film) =

2016 film directed by Nic Auerbach

- Directed by: Nic Auerbach
- Screenplay by: Bo Bickle
- Story by: David Marconi
- Produced by: Dean Fisher; Robert Fucilla
- Starring: Robert Fucilla; Sarah Armstrong; Danny Webb; Patrick Ryecart; Antonio Aakeel; Isabelle Allen; Dean Bardini; Jack Brady; John Davis; Jonathan Rhodes; Surinder Duhra; Loren O'Dair; Izabella Fucilla
- Cinematography: Franz Pagot
- Edited by: Kant Pan
- Music by: Erran Baron Cohen
- Production companies: Scanner Rhodes Productions; Robert Fucilla Company
- Distributed by: Rialto Distribution
- Release date: 18 January 2016 (London)
- Running time: 99 minutes
- Country: United Kingdom
- Language: English

The Contract (previously known as Squat) is a 2016 British crime thriller feature film directed by Nic Auerbach. The Contract is a nascent love story of two people from polar opposite worlds, thrown together by circumstance. The film stars Robert Fucilla, Sarah Armstrong, Danny Webb, Patrick Ryecart, Antonio Aakeel, and Jack Brady. The film was released on DVD and online 18 January 2016.

== Plot ==
The Contract follows Nick Dayton (Robert Fucilla) a self-centered, narcissistic, Hedge Fund Trader, who prefers the extremely lavish life-style his job affords. Returning from a business trip, Nick arrives home to his multimillion-dollar mansion, to find it has peculiarly been taken over by squatters. It is here, Nick finds himself fortuitously linked with Erika (Sarah Armstrong). A damaged young woman. and seemingly the polar opposite of Nick, Erika is a woman suffering from amnesia and mysteriously has Nick's address tattooed on her arm. Attempting to unravel the mystery, both Nick and Erika find themselves enmeshed in the violent underworld of organised crime, led by the unhinged and barbarous Roy (Danny Webb). Now acutely aware the seriousness of the situation, Nick soon comes to the rare realisation that not all of his problems can be disentangled with money. If Nick has any chance of solving this bewildering mystery, and save both his and Erika's lives, he is going to have to use his ingenuity and smarts to outwit both the syndicate and the violent and sadistic Roy.

== Cast ==
- Robert Fucilla as Nick Dayton
- Sarah Armstrong as Erika
- Danny Webb as Roy
- Patrick Ryecart as Gregg
- Antonio Aakeel as Raza
- Isabelle Allen as Casey
- Dean Bardini as Joey
- Jack Brady as Falco
- Nicky Evans as Dragon
- Jody Halse as Hughie
- John Davis as The Marvel
- Jonathan Rhodes as Chris
- Surinder Duhra as Fahad
- Loren O'Dair as Melanie
- Izabella Fucilla as Amy
- Holly Rose Hoyland as Audrey
- Alexandra Agass as Squatter
- Leon Annor as Pork Belly
- Cole Anderson-James as Simon

== Production ==
The Contract was developed by Scanner Rhodes Productions and Robert Fucilla Company initially under the working title Squat. In post production, the film's title changed to The Contract. The entire film was shot in London, England late 2014 - early 2015.

== Release ==
Rialto distribution secured the Australian distribution rights and the film was released globally on DVD and online / Via VOD services 18 January 2016.
