= Glenn Wilhide =

American TV producer and screenwriter

- Born: 1958 (age 67–68); Maryland, U.S.
- Education: Leighton Park School
- Alma mater: University of York
- Occupations: Screenwriter, television producer, playwright
- Spouse: Jennifer Caron Hall (m. 1996)

Glenn Wilhide (born 1958) is an American screenwriter, playwright, and television producer.

In 2025 Glenn Wilhide wrote Akenfield, a new stage adaptation of the rural masterpiece by Ronald Blythe, which in September 2025, with support from Arts Council England, was produced in Suffolk by SHAKE Festival, directed by Jennifer Caron Hall. The set was created by sculptor Laurence Edwards and the cast was made up of local Suffolk people with authentic Suffolk voices.

== Early life and family ==
Wilhide was born in Maryland, USA, to American parents. His family moved to the UK when he was a child and he was educated at Leighton Park School in Reading, Berkshire, and the University of York where he read English and History of Art. He is married to Jennifer Caron Hall, the daughter of actress and ballerina Leslie Caron and the late Sir Peter Hall.

His paternal grandfather (1890–1954), who like he and his father was also named Glenn Calvin Wilhide, was for many years the design director at the Black and Decker company in Towson, Maryland, where he invented the first hand power drill, among many other patents.

== Production career ==
Glenn Wilhide was co-founder of the independent production company, ZED Ltd in 1985, and with partner Sophie Balhetchet, produced dramas, documentaries, and talk shows.

Wilhide's first full producer credit was a feature film titled The Road Home (1985), directed by Jerzy Kaszubowski and shot in Poland for Channel 4. It was released as Cienie in Polish one year later.

With Balhetchet, Wilhide produced The Camomile Lawn (1992), directed by Peter Hall and starring Felicity Kendal, Jennifer Ehle, Toby Stevens, Tara Fitzgerald and a young Rebecca Hall. It was nominated for a BAFTA for Best Drama Series and won the BAFTA for Best Costume. In 2018 it was named No 4 in The 60 Best British TV Shows of All Time by The Daily Telegraph.

Also with Balhetchet, Wilhide produced The Manageress (1993) about a female manager of a football club, starring Cherie Lunghi, Tom Georgeson and Warren Clarke. It was commissioned for a second series. A BBC documentary about Karren Brady, who became the first female managing director of Birmingham City F.C. in 1994, was titled The Real Life Manageress after the series.

Wilhide and Balhetchet also produced The Peacock Spring (1996) starring Naveen Andrews, Jennifer Caron Hall and Hattie Morahan.

Wilhide disbanded ZED Ltd in 1996, and began working as a freelance producer at Granada TV, developing projects primarily with Gub Neal in the drama department.

Wilhide produced the first series of The Royle Family (1998) starring Caroline Aherne and Craig Cash, which they co-wrote with Henry Normal. The Royle Family won the Best New Television Comedy award at The British Comedy Awards, and it ranks 31st in the BFI TV 100. The following year Wilhide produced Mrs Merton and Malcolm (1999) written by The Royle Family team. Both shows were made by Granada TV for the BBC.

Wilhilde produced Metropolis (2000), about a group of recent graduate friends finding their feet in London, written by Peter Morgan, which he also directed with Tim Whitby.

== List of works ==
Year	Title	Director	Studio(s)	Notes
1984	A TV Dante	Peter Greenaway, Tom Phillips	Artifax for Channel 4	Associate Producer (Pilot)
1984	26 Bathrooms	Peter Greenaway	Artifax for Channel 4	Associate Producer (Pilot)
1985	The Possessed	Yuri Lyubimov, Jolyon Wimhurst	Zed Ltd for Channel 4	Associate Producer
1986	Le Tango Stupéfiant	Anne Foreman	Zed Ltd for Channel 4; La Sept	Producer
1987	The Road Home	Jerzy Kaszubowski	Zed Ltd for Film4; Film Polski	Producer
1988	HOPPLA	Anne Teresa de Keersmaker	Zed Ltd for Channel 4; La Sept	Producer
1988	The Manageress	Chris King	Zed Ltd for Channel 4; ECA	Producer
1989	The Missing Reel	Christopher Rawlence	Zed Ltd for Channel 4; La Sept; Bravo	Producer
1992	The Camomile Lawn	Peter Hall	Zed Ltd for Channel 4; ABC	Producer
1994	Why East Grinstead?	Ian Sellar	Zed Ltd for Channel 4	Producer
1994	Loach on Location	Laurence Boulting	Zed Ltd for BBC Two	Producer
1995	The Peacock Spring	Christopher Morahan	Zed Ltd for BBC One	Producer
1998	The Royle Family	Mark Mylod	Granada TV for BBC Two	Producer (first season)
1995	Mrs Merton and Malcolm	John Birkin	Granada TV for BBC One	Producer
1999	Metropolis	Glenn Wilhide, Tim Whitby	Granada TV for ITV	Producer and Director
2025	Akenfield, A Play	Jennifer Caron Hall	SHAKE Festival	Playwright
