= Katie and Emily =

- Skins episode
- Episode no.: Season 3 Episode 9
- Directed by: Charles Martin
- Written by: Malcolm Campbell; Bryan Elsley
- Original air date: 19 March 2009

Guest appearances
- Ronni Ancona as Jenna Fitch; John Bishop as Rob Fitch; Antonio Khela as Shop Security; Carla Nicholls as Shop Security; Redd Smith as James Fitch; Allana Taylor as Maria; Giles Thomas as Doug; Victoria Wicks as College Director

Episode chronology
← Previous "Effy"	Next → "Finale"

"Katie and Emily" is the ninth and penultimate episode of the third series of the British teen drama Skins, which first aired on 19 March 2009 on E4 in both Ireland and the United Kingdom. The episode was written by Malcolm Campbell and Bryan Elsley, and was directed by Charles Martin. The episode focuses on the characters of twins Katie and Emily Fitch (Megan and Kathryn Prescott, respectively) as they prepare for their college's annual ball. Katie refuses to leave home, recovering from being hit in the head with a rock, and faces her weakening control over her sister. Emily, meanwhile, is heartbroken when her girlfriend, Naomi Campbell (Lily Loveless), turns down Emily's invitation to the ball, and comes out to her family about her sexuality.

"Katie and Emily" featured numerous cameo appearances by the series' crew members and the winners of various Skins-related competitions. While filming one of the episode's fight scenes, according to Kathryn Prescott, the actors "did it a bit too properly", with injuries sustained to both Megan Prescott and Giles Thomas. The episode drew just under one million viewers on its first broadcast and was E4's highest-rated programme of the week. It was received generally well by critics.

== Plot ==
Emily, disguised as her twin sister Katie, arrives at college to take Katie's history exam. In reality, Katie is at home, with nine stitches to the head after being hit with a rock by their friend Effy Stonem, who has disappeared. Katie is embarrassed about how her injuries look, and miserable over the loss of her boyfriend Freddie McClair (Luke Pasqualino), who only dated her to spite Effy, his real love interest. She begins to take notice of all the hints in front of her, and realises that she can no longer hide from herself the fact that Emily is homosexual. At college, Naomi uncovers Emily's disguise (which had not fooled JJ or Freddie either) and tells her that she plans to spend the summer alone in Cyprus. When Emily tells Naomi that she will miss her, they kiss in an empty corridor and later find themselves at Naomi's house where they have sex. Afterward, Emily asks Naomi to the college ball, but Naomi, still crippled by insecurity over her sexuality, refuses, leaving Emily heartbroken. Emily leaves and at the bus stop meets Thomas Tomone (Merveille Lukeba), who offers her his shoes and jacket and is unconcerned when she tells him that she is gay. He tries to comfort her but admits that he believes it impossible to stop loving somebody, referring to his ex-girlfriend Pandora Moon (Lisa Backwell). Emily returns home and comes out to her family, telling them that she has been having sex with a girl named Naomi. Her father, Rob (John Bishop), dismisses it as a joke and her mother, Jenna (Ronni Ancona), is speechless, while Katie tries to deny it. She and Emily have a heated argument, leaving Katie crying.

The following morning, Naomi visits the Fitches' house, but Jenna answers the door. She confronts Naomi, convincing her that Emily is not gay and warning Naomi to stay away from her. Naomi too denies her own sexual orientation and leaves hastily. After waking up, Katie and Emily reconcile in their own secret language, and Emily reluctantly agrees to go to the ball with Katie. While shopping for ball gowns, they meet Pandora, who is returning a dress since Thomas has not forgiven her for her infidelity with their friend James Cook. The twins run into Freddie and JJ Jones (Ollie Barbieri) while trying on dresses. JJ reveals to Emily that he told Freddie that he had sex with her, and Freddie inadvertently tells Katie, who was unaware of this. She guilts Freddie into accompanying her to the ball and volunteers Emily to go with JJ. Later, she is furious with Emily for having sex with JJ without her permission, still insisting that Emily is "not gay, [just] stupid". Katie intercepts one of Naomi's phone calls to Emily and tricks Naomi into meeting with her, where she reveals Emily's affair with JJ and warns Naomi not to come to the ball.

As Katie, Emily, Freddie and JJ prepare to enter the ball, Naomi arrives, announcing that she knows about Emily and JJ's fling before she walks in. An upset Emily leaves. Katie starts a fight with Naomi. Unaware of Emily's presence, she admits her deceit and claims that Emily "deserved it." Infuriated, Emily attacks Katie, wreaking havoc through the entire ball. Emily finally overpowers her sister and raises a fist to punch her, but, after a moment's hesitation, reconsiders and instead helps Katie to stand up, declaring that she is "not her." In front of everybody, Emily tells Katie that she is her own person and that she is in love with Naomi. Katie accepts Emily's individuality and sexuality, and Naomi, no longer ashamed of their relationship, extends her hand to Emily. The couple leaves the ball hand-in-hand and Naomi tells Emily that she loves her too. Meanwhile, Pandora apologises again to Thomas and he forgives her, re-introducing himself.

== Production ==
"Katie and Emily" featured a number of cameo appearances. Phil Goldie, who won the "Skins Needs You" competition for young directors, appears as a man in the café where Naomi meets Katie. Clara Nicholls and Antonio Aakeel, the winners of a competition to win a speaking role in Skins, played the shop assistant and security guard respectively at the boutique where Katie and Emily shop for ball gowns, while another finalist from the competition, Allana Taylor, starred as a girl dancing with the students' Head of Form, Doug (Giles Thomas), at the ball. One of the series' runners, Laurence Wigfield, played a bystander at the ball and the crew's "jack of all trades", Tyrone Hyman, appeared on a poster in Katie and Emily's bedroom.

Lisa Backwell described the filming of the ball as her "most favourite, most mental day of filming". At the end of the final take of Pandora's dancing with Doug, the students' head of year, the entire crew danced into shot. Director Charles Martin was initially dubious of whether Megan and Kathryn Prescott would be able to film Katie and Emily's fight well enough, but Kathryn said that on their first rehearsal they "did it a bit too properly", ripping out parts of Megan's hair extensions. Emily's accidental punching of Doug during the fight was choreographed so that when Kathryn Prescott punched the air in front of Giles Thomas's face, the camera angle would make it appear that she was actually hitting him. While they were filming, however, Prescott genuinely punched Thomas by accident, causing him to stumble back and step on Megan Prescott's bare foot, which she injured.

== Reception ==
"Katie and Emily" brought in 957,000 viewers and was E4's highest-rated programme of the week with an audience share of 4.4 percent. Another 320,000 viewers watched the episode an hour after its initial broadcast on E4's timeshift channel, E4+1.

Sarah Warn, editor-in-chief of lesbian-based website AfterEllen.com, thought that the portrayal of Emily and Naomi's relationship in the episode was "a good example of a well-plotted, well-executed, and well-acted storyline coming to a satisfying conclusion", which she regarded as "a noteworthy event given how few TV shows you can say that about". She felt that Emily's changing relationship with Katie as a significant part of her character development made her "sympathetic and relatable to those who might have otherwise have difficulty relating to a lesbian character". One critic for PopSugar.com wrote that in this episode the "drama was still in full flow" despite the absence of principal characters Effy and Cook, and was impressed with the episode's "uplifting ending". They believed that Ronni Ancona was "fab" as the twins' mother, and regarded Pandora and Doug's dance at the ball as a "fantastic comic moment". Ellie Newton-Syms of InJournalism Magazine was "thrilled" with the conclusion of Katie and Emily's storyline. The entertainment editor for eurOut.org, a website for European lesbians, wrote that she "almost [felt] like joining in" when Emily cried after breaking up with Naomi, and thought that the twins' secret language was "very cute and adorable". Dan French, in a review for Digital Spy, highlighted the episode's "dramas aplenty" and believed Katie and Emily's parents to be "slightly creepy".
