= Central Board of Film Censors =

Pakistani film censorship board

Central Board of Film Censors Punjab Film Censor Board Sindh Board of Film Censors
- Formation: 1963; 63 years ago
- Purpose: Film Certification
- Headquarters: Central: Islamabad; Punjab: Lahore; Sindh: Karachi
- Region served: Central: Islamabad; Rawalpindi; Cantonments; Khyber Pakhtunkhwa; Balochistan; Punjab: Punjab; Sindh: Sindh
- Parent organisation: Central: Ministry of Information & Broadcasting; Punjab: Government of Punjab; Sindh: Government of Sindh

The Central Board of Film Censors (CBFC; Urdu: مرکزی فلم سنسر بورڈ) is a film censorship board and rating system body under the Ministry of Information & Broadcasting for the Government of Pakistan. Since the Eighteenth Amendment to the Constitution of Pakistan its jurisdiction has been limited to Islamabad, Rawalpindi, Cantonments, Khyber Pakhtunkhwa and Balochistan; with separate censor boards for Punjab (Punjab Film Censor Board, PFCB) and Sindh (Sindh Board of Film Censors, SBFC) headquartered in Lahore and Karachi respectively. Though the CBFC maintains an unofficial dominant position over the latter boards.

These boards are tasked with regulating the public screening of films under the provisions of the Motion Picture Ordinance, 1979.

== Function ==
The Motion Pictures Ordinance, 1979 focuses upon a broad policy framework and administrative procedures for the certification of films for public screening. The film censorship code covers wide aspects of "morals and ethnics" which lays down the guiding principles for cinema in Pakistan. Strict policy has been adopted to ensure that no scene or dialogue in a film is passed which is considered "derogatory to the accepted moral standards of the society". Certifications is refused if, in the opinion of the board, the film or any part thereof:

1. ridicules, disparages or attacks Islam or any religious sect, caste and creed.
2. questions the integrity, security or defense of Pakistan or hurts national sentiments.
3. undermines public order, decency or morality, which includes vulgar dialogues, songs, or gestures.
4. glorifies vice or crime or amounts to incitement of a criminal offense.

Any film refused certification may appeal within thirty days of the date of refusal.

== Certification ==
=== CBFC ===
- U: Any film with U certification is fit for unrestricted public screening and without the need for parental guidance. These films contain little violence, no sexual scenes and no abusive language.
- F: Family (akin to U above)
- PG: Akin to U/A
- A: Any film with A certification is restricted to adults or needs parental guidance for viewing. These films contain significant violence, sexual scenes and abusive language and can include controversial adult themes considered unsuitable for young viewers.

=== SBFC ===
- U: Universal, approved for general audiences
- PG: Parental Guidance
- PG-13: Parents Cautioned
- PG-15: Suitable for 15 years and older
- 18+: For Adults only

Source: Jawaid, Mohammad Kamran (4 November 2018). "Spotlight: A House Divided". Dawn.

== See also ==
- Censorship in Pakistan
- List of films banned in Pakistan
