= Antonio Aakeel =

English actor

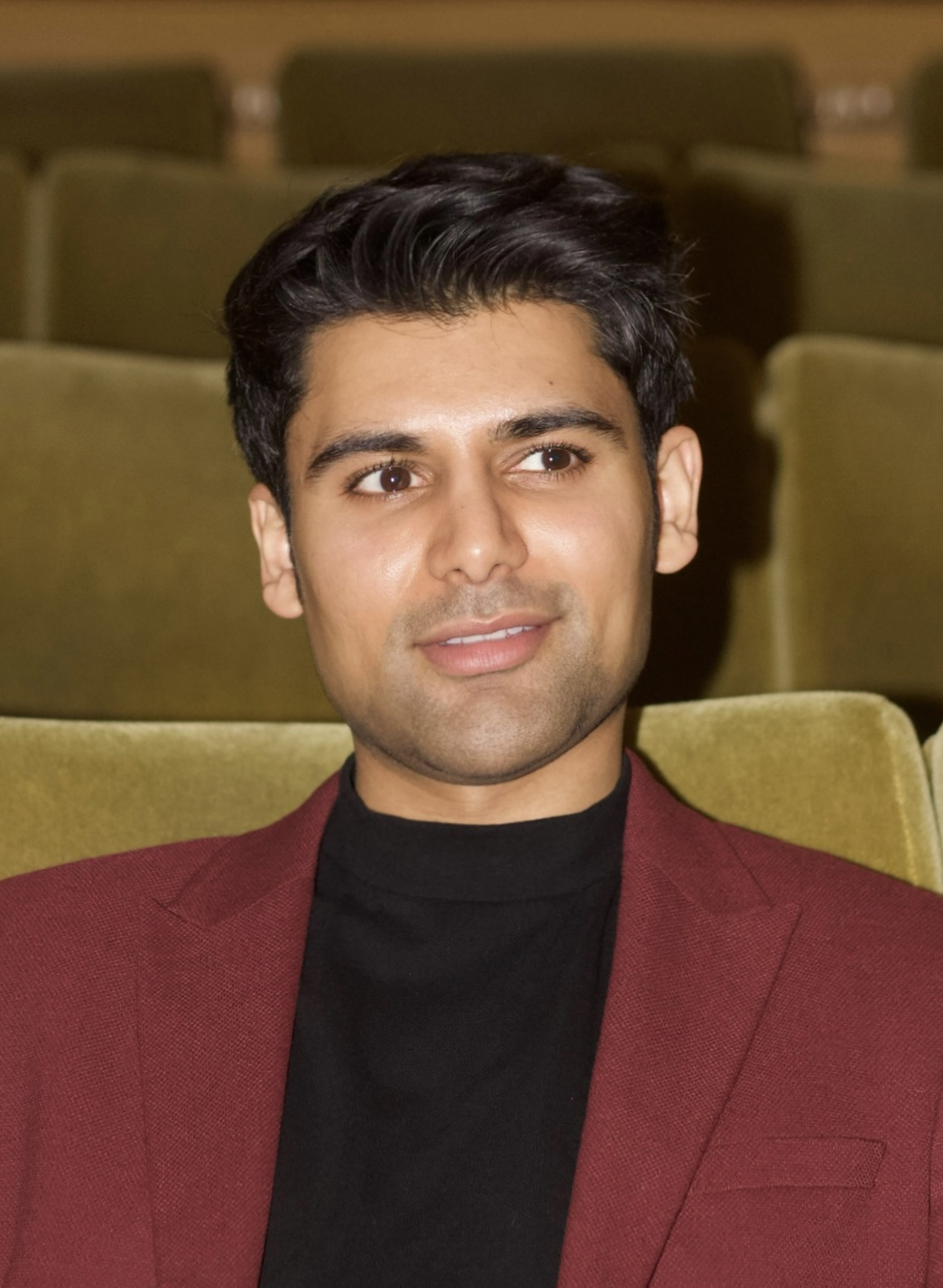
- Antonio Aakeel
- Born: Wolverhampton, England
- Occupation: Actor
- Television: Three Girls; Ackley Bridge; Dublin Murders

Antonio Aakeel is an English actor, known for starring in the Apple TV Series Slow Horses and leading the film Eaten by Lions, for which he was named a Screen International Star of Tomorrow by Screen Daily. He also appeared in Tomb Raider and the BAFTA award-winning series Three Girls.

== Early life ==
Antonio Aakeel was born Antonio Khela in Wolverhampton, England, and moved around the West Midlands as a child. He was inspired to pursue acting after being given a one-line role in a school nativity play and subsequently began acting in local theatre. He speaks Punjabi and Hindi.

== Career ==
=== Film ===
Aakeel gained his first leading feature role in the film Eaten by Lions as Omar, a young man in search of his estranged father. The film had a wide cinematic release in April 2019 and also starred comedians Johnny Vegas, Jack Carroll and Asim Chaudhry.

Screen Daily announced Aakeel would be leading Abid Khan's debut feature Granada Nights as Ben, a heartbroken British tourist on a journey of hedonism and discovery in Granada, Spain.

He appeared opposite Oscar-winner Alicia Vikander in Warner Bros.' 2018 Tomb Raider reboot, directed by Roar Uthaug.

In 2016, Aakeel was cast alongside Riz Ahmed and Billie Piper in the London crime thriller City of Tiny Lights directed by BAFTA winner Pete Travis. The film had its world premiere at the Toronto International Film Festival 2016 and released in UK cinemas April 2017.

Later that year, Aakeel landed a supporting role in The Hungry, Film London's contemporary feature adaptation of Shakespeare's Titus Andronicus playing troubled brother to Life of Pi's Suraj Sharma. The Film premiered under special presentations at the 2017 Toronto International Film Festival.

In 2015, he appeared as Raza in feature film The Contract, written by David Marconi and directed by Nic Auerbach.

Aakeel starred as Nasir Baloch in the political short film The Line of Freedom, directed by David Whitney. The film depicts the true story of a murdered student rights activist and premiered at the Dubai International Film Festival. Upon its release, the film immediately met with controversy and was subsequently prohibited in Pakistan.

=== Television ===
Aakeel gained his first television role in the E4 series Skins. He then led an episode of BBC One's Moving On playing Mati, a young refugee whose leave to remain is revoked on his eighteenth birthday. Directed by Reece Dinsdale, the episode won 'Best Daytime Programme' at the Royal Television Society Awards in 2018.

In May 2017, he appeared in BBC One's three-part BAFTA winning drama Three Girls directed by Philippa Lowthorpe. In 2019, Aakeel appeared in two episodes of the Channel 4 drama series Ackley Bridge as Anwar Wazir. Later that year, Aakeel began portraying the recurring role of Rafael Hyland in the BBC One thriller series Dublin Murders.

=== Video game ===
Aakeel gained his first video game role in the Immortals of Aveum as Devyn.

=== Theatre ===
Aakeel was cast in the title role in the stage adaptation of Guantanamo Boy. The play ran at the Half Moon Theatre and toured nationally at Middle Temple Hall, Almeida Theatre, The Hat Factory, Mercury Theatre, Burnley Youth Theatre and The Drum Theatre. The Stage's Susan Elkin wrote Aakeel "is great as the distraught, anguished, terrified Khalid. The downhill spiral followed by the final return of a damaged-for-life boy to Rochdale is well handled too. He has a very expressive face."

In 2015, he played the lead role of Artie in Waiting for Garbo at the Crescent Theatre as part of the Birmingham Theatre Festival. Love Midlands Theatre reviewed the performance, commenting his "portrayal of a brash New Yorker falling apart is utterly convincing."

Antonio has also performed locally with Midlands based theatre company Round Midnight.

== Filmography ==
=== Film ===
Year	Film	Role	Notes	Ref.
2012	Duty of Care	Rashid	Short film	
2013	Dry the River	Boy	Short film; Director also	
2013	The Line of Freedom	Nasir Baloch		
2013	Kick About	Ben	Short film	
2016	The Contract	Raza		
2016	Guilty Pleasures	Imi	Television film	
2016	City of Tiny Lights	Young Lovely		
2017	The Hungry	Chirag Joshi		
2018	Tomb Raider	Nitin		
2018	Christmas at the Palace	Clerk	Television film	
2019	Eaten by Lions	Omar		
2019	Badla	Sunny Singh Toor		
2019	White Girl		Short film	
2021	Granada Nights	Ben		
2022	I Came By	Faisal		
2023	Footprints on Water	Rehan		
2023	In Camera	Actor		
2023	All the Lights Still Burning	Musa	Short film	
2023	Sahela	Vir Oza		
2024	Let It Flow	Anwar	Short film	
2025	Sleep	Chris	Short film	
2025	Good Behaviour	Sal	Short film	

=== Television ===
Year	Title	Role	Notes	Ref.
2009	Skins	Shop Security	Episode: "Katie and Emily"	
2014	Doctors	Aasim Masood	Episode: "Redirect the Heart"	
2016	Moving On	Mati	Episode: "Eighteen"	
2016	Doctors	Mark 'Stotty' Stott	Episode: "Life Unexpected"	
2017	Three Girls	Immy	Miniseries; 3 episodes	
2017	Man Like Mobeen	Shahid	Recurring role; 2 episodes	
2019	Almost Never	Frankie	Episode: "The Ice Cream"	
2019	Ackley Bridge	Anwar Wazir	Recurring role; 2 episodes	
2019	Dublin Murders	Rafe Lahiri	Recurring role; 4 episodes	
2021	Octonauts: Above & Beyond	Paani	Series regular; Voice role	
2022	Slow Horses	Hassan Ahmed	Recurring role; 6 episodes	
2025	Sherlock & Daughter	Swann	Recurring role; 5 episodes	
2025	Too Much	Raven	Miniseries; 3 episodes	
2025	Mr. Bigstuff	Matt	Episode: "Series 2, Episode 4"	
