= Black Adam (film) =

2022 American film by Jaume Collet-Serra

- Theatrical release poster
- Directed by: Jaume Collet-Serra
- Written by: Adam Sztykiel; Rory Haines Sohrab Noshirvani
- Based on: Characters from DC
- Produced by: Beau Flynn; Hiram Garcia; Dwayne Johnson; Dany Garcia
- Starring: Dwayne Johnson; Aldis Hodge; Noah Centineo; Sarah Shahi; Quintessa Swindell; Marwan Kenzari; Pierce Brosnan
- Cinematography: Lawrence Sher
- Edited by: Mike Sale; John Lee
- Music by: Lorne Balfe
- Production companies: New Line Cinema; DC Films; Seven Bucks Productions; FlynnPictureCo.
- Distributed by: Warner Bros. Pictures
- Release dates: October 3, 2022 (Mexico City); October 21, 2022 (United States)
- Running time: 125 minutes
- Country: United States
- Language: English
- Budget: $190–260 million
- Box office: $393.5 million

Black Adam is a 2022 American superhero film starring Dwayne Johnson as the title character. Based on the DC Comics character Teth-Adam / Black Adam, it is a spin-off from Shazam! (2019) and the eleventh film in the DC Extended Universe (DCEU). Directed by Jaume Collet-Serra from a screenplay by Adam Sztykiel, Rory Haines and Sohrab Noshirvani, the film follows Teth-Adam / Black Adam, an ancient superhuman who is released from his magic imprisonment by a group of archeologists to free the nation of Kahndaq from the crime syndicate Intergang, whose local leader plans to obtain an ancient and powerful relic called the Crown of Sabbac. Aldis Hodge, Noah Centineo, Sarah Shahi, Quintessa Swindell, Marwan Kenzari and Pierce Brosnan appear in supporting roles.

Johnson was attached to Shazam! early in development and confirmed to portray the villain Black Adam in September 2014, but the producers, at Johnson's urging, later decided to give the character his own film. Sztykiel was hired in October 2017. Collet-Serra joined in June 2019, with a planned release date of December 2021, but this timeline was delayed by the COVID-19 pandemic. Additional casting took place over the next year, including four members of the Justice Society of America, along with the script being rewritten by Haines and Noshirvani. Principal photography took place from April to August 2021 at Trilith Studios in Atlanta, Georgia, and also in Los Angeles.

Black Adam premiered in Mexico City on October 3, 2022, and was theatrically released in the United States on October 21 to mixed-to-negative reviews from critics. It failed to break even at the box office, grossing $393 million against a budget of $190–$260 million, losing the studio an estimated $50–100 million, becoming a box-office bomb.

== Plot ==
In 2600 BC, the tyrannical king Ahk-Ton of Kahndaq enslaves his people to mine the mythical metal Eternium, which he uses to forge the Crown of Sabbac and gain power and invincibility. After a young slave attempts to lead an uprising, the Council of Wizards chooses him as its champion, transforming him into an adult superhero. He kills Ahk-Ton, ending his reign.

In the present day, Kahndaq suffers under the criminal organization Intergang. Archaeologist Adrianna Tomaz searches for the Crown of Sabbac with her brother Karim and colleagues Samir and Ishmael. After finding the crown in a tomb, Adrianna and her companions encounter Intergang troops, who kill Samir. Desperate to survive, Adrianna recites an incantation that awakens the superhuman warrior Teth-Adam. After Adam slaughters the troops, US government official Amanda Waller considers him a threat and summons the Justice Society to capture him. Its members, Hawkman, Doctor Fate, Cyclone and Atom Smasher, intervene to stop Adam's killing spree and tell Adrianna that he was an imprisoned killer rather than Kahndaq's savior.

Ishmael reveals that he leads Intergang's Kahndaq division and is the last descendant of Ahk-Ton. He kidnaps Adrianna's son, Amon, who has hidden the crown. To rescue Amon, the group recovers the crown and surrenders it to Ishmael. When Ishmael attempts to shoot Amon, Adam loses control of his powers, killing Ishmael and injuring Amon. Overcome with guilt, Adam flees and tells Hawkman the truth about Kahndaq's champion: the boy was his late son, Hurut, who was killed by Ahk-Ton's assassins after they murdered his mother. The Wizards had transferred Hurut's powers to Adam to save his life, but Hurut was killed before Adam could protect him. Driven by grief and rage, Adam killed Ahk-Ton and destroyed his palace. The Council of Wizards deemed him unworthy and imprisoned him with the crown after he retaliated by killing all its members except Shazam.

Believing himself unfit to be a hero, Adam surrenders to the Justice Society, which transports him to an underwater Task Force X black site in Antarctica. There, Emilia Harcourt places him in stasis. Meanwhile, Doctor Fate again foresees Hawkman's impending death.

The Justice Society discovers that Ishmael deliberately provoked Adam into killing him so he could be reborn as Sabbac, the champion of the six eponymous demons. When Sabbac summons the Legions of Hell to terrorize Kahndaq, the Justice Society fails to defeat him. Believing that Hawkman's death can be prevented through his own sacrifice, Fate confronts Sabbac alone. He uses astral projection to free Adam before Sabbac kills him. Meanwhile, Amon, Adrianna and Karim rally Kahndaq's people to fight the invading demons. Sabbac overpowers Hawkman, but Adam arrives and kills him, causing the Legions of Hell to vanish.

The Justice Society leaves Kahndaq on good terms with Adam, who destroys the old throne, believing the country needs a protector rather than a ruler. He adopts a new name: Black Adam.

In a mid-credits scene, Waller warns Adam not to leave Kahndaq and calls in a favor. Superman appears and offers to negotiate with him.

== Cast ==
- Dwayne Johnson as Teth-Adam / Black Adam:
  A former slave from Kahndaq who was bestowed with the powers of multiple Egyptian gods by his son after he was mortally wounded by king Ahk-Ton's soldiers. He possesses "the stamina of Shu, the swiftness of Heru, the strength of Amon, the wisdom of Zehuti, the power of Aten, and the courage of Mehen". Benjamin Patterson serves as the body double for Teth-Adam in scenes where he is depicted in his human form, with Johnson's face superimposed onto the character for these sequences. The character previously appeared in Shazam! (2019) in a brief cameo, during a sequence where The Wizard teaches Billy Batson about the previous recipients of his powers. Johnson also voiced the character in a post-credits cameo, ahead of the character's live-action debut, in the unrelated animated film DC League of Super-Pets (2022), in which he also voiced Krypto.
- Aldis Hodge as Carter Hall / Hawkman: The leader of the Justice Society who wields technology and weapons made of Nth metal, a substance from another planet.
- Noah Centineo as Albert "Al" Rothstein / Atom Smasher: A young member of the Justice Society, with the metahuman ability to control his molecular structure which manipulates his size and strength.
- Sarah Shahi as Adrianna Tomaz: A university professor and resistance fighter in modern-day Kahndaq, who proves to be an ally for Adam and the Justice Society.
- Marwan Kenzari as Ishmael Gregor / Sabbac:
  The last descendant of King Ahk-Ton and militant leader of the Kahndaq division of the criminal organization Intergang. Unlike Teth-Adam, Sabbac was bestowed with the powers of the six most powerful demons of Hell: Satan, Aym, Belial, Beelzebub, Asmodeus, and Crateis.
  - Kenzari also portrays Ahk-Ton, Ishmael's ancestor and the ancient tyrannical king of Kahndaq, who was killed by Adam.
- Quintessa Swindell as Maxine Hunkel / Cyclone:
  A young member of the Justice Society, who was experimented on and injected with nanobot technology at a young age, resulting in her receiving the ability to control and manipulate wind. As the granddaughter of Abigail "Ma" Hunkel / Red Tornado she seeks to live up to her familial superhero legacy. Swindell studied dancing techniques when designing the character's movement.
- Bodhi Sabongui as Amon Tomaz: Adrianna's teenage son, who not only befriends Adam, but believes him to be a hero.
- Pierce Brosnan as Kent Nelson / Doctor Fate:
  An experienced and senior member of the Justice Society, who wields the Helmet of Fate and is capable of various sorcery abilities. Nelson is the son of an archeologist, with whom he discovered the tomb of Nabu the Wise. After attaining a mystic-sentient helmet from another dimension, which chooses who it allows to wield it, he mastered his powers and used them as a superhero over many years. Brosnan wore a motion capture suit for the role.

Additionally, Mohammed Amer portrays Karim, Adrianna's brother and Amon's uncle, and James Cusati-Moyer portrays Samir, a colleague of Adrianna and Karim. Jalon Christian appears as Hurut, Adam's son who becomes the original Champion of Kahndaq deemed pure of heart to wield the powers of Shazam, with his superhero form portrayed by Uli Latukefu. Odelya Halevi portrays Shiruta, Adam's wife who was murdered by Ahk-Ton's men during the flashback scenes set in ancient Kahndaq. Henry Winkler cameos as Al Pratt, Rothstein's uncle, who was the previous Atom Smasher.

Djimon Hounsou reprises his role from Shazam! as the wizard Shazam, and Jennifer Holland reprises her role from The Suicide Squad (2021) and Peacemaker (2022) as Emilia Harcourt. Viola Davis and Henry Cavill appear uncredited, reprising their respective DCEU roles as Amanda Waller and Superman. This was Cavill's final performance as Superman before it was announced that he would step down from the role.

The demons Satan, Aym, Belial, Beelzebub, Asmodeus, and Crateis also appear in this film and are voiced by uncredited actors.

== Production ==
=== Development ===
New Line Cinema began the development of a Shazam feature film in the early 2000s, based on the DC Comics character Captain Marvel. The title came from the wizard Shazam who gives the hero his powers, with DC unable to use the title Captain Marvel due to legal issues. Peter Segal signed on to direct the film in April 2006, and Dwayne Johnson was approached about portraying Captain Marvel later that year. By November 2007, Johnson was also interested in the film's antagonist, Black Adam, and had received positive responses from fans about him possibly playing that character. Development on the film was placed on hold by January 2009, but had begun again by April 2014 when Warner Bros. Pictures (the parent company of New Line) and DC began planning a slate of superhero films for its shared universe, the DC Extended Universe (DCEU). That August, Johnson said he was still attached to the film but had not yet decided if he would play Captain Marvel or Black Adam. A month later, Johnson announced that he would portray Black Adam. Johnson was paid $22.5 million for his involvement.

In January 2017, Johnson met with DC's Geoff Johns to discuss the project after studio executives grew concerned that an actor of Johnson's profile was being used as a villain and supporting character in the film instead of starring in it. Following that meeting, they decided to split the project into two films: Shazam! (2019), starring the hero Captain Marvel, whom DC had since rebranded as Shazam; and Black Adam, with Johnson starring as the title antihero. Johnson said the two characters would meet onscreen in the future. Johns confirmed in July that Johnson would not appear in Shazam!, though his likeness is used in that film for a magical hologram of Black Adam conjured by the wizard Shazam.

Adam Sztykiel was hired to write the screenplay for Black Adam in October 2017, with Johnson set to produce the film with Dany and Hiram Garcia of Seven Bucks Productions along with Beau Flynn of FlynnPictureCo. At that time, there were plans for Johnson to first appear as Black Adam in the sequel to Suicide Squad (2016), which had Gavin O'Connor attached as writer and possible director. The intention was for the members of the Suicide Squad to be tracking a weapon of mass destruction which would be revealed as Black Adam in a small role for Johnson, but these plans were abandoned when O'Connor left that film in 2018. Sztykiel completed a draft of the script by April 2018, when Johnson said there was potential for filming to begin in 2019. At the end of August, Sztykiel handed in another draft and further revisions were underway. Hiram Garcia said then that giving Shazam and Black Adam their own films was allowing the best movie for each character to be developed, and he added that their depiction of Black Adam was not going to be "softened up for audiences", explaining that he is "not the boy scout superhero, he's the guy that's like, okay, you cross him? Well, I rip your head off". In December, Johnson said filming would not begin until the end of 2019 at the earliest due to his commitments to Jumanji: The Next Level (2019) and Red Notice (2021).

After the successful release of Shazam!, Black Adam became a priority for New Line. By June 2019, Jaume Collet-Serra was in talks to direct the film after impressing Johnson as the director of Jungle Cruise (2021). Collet-Serra described Black Adam as the Dirty Harry of superheroes, and said the film would show a darker version of Johnson compared to the adventure comedy Jungle Cruise. Johnson revealed in October that filming would begin in July 2020, and announced the following month that Black Adam was scheduled to be released on December 22, 2021. He also said Shazam would not appear in the film, but members of the Justice Society of America (JSA) would be introduced.

=== Pre-production ===
Johnson stated in mid-April 2020 that filming had been delayed due to the COVID-19 pandemic, and they were now planning to begin production in August or September of that year. By July, filming was expected to begin in early 2021 in Atlanta, Georgia, and Noah Centineo was cast as Atom Smasher. During the virtual DC FanDome event in August, Johnson revealed that the film's version of the JSA would include Hawkman, Doctor Fate, and Cyclone, in addition to Atom Smasher. He explained that Hawkgirl was originally included in the team, but for a complicated reason she ultimately could not be used in the film and was replaced with Cyclone.

Rory Haines and Sohrab Noshirvani had written a new draft of the script by September, when Aldis Hodge was cast as Hawkman. Collet-Serra discussed his comparisons of the character of Dirty Harry with Johnson, saying "The systems were corrupt, so you had criminals taking advantage. You needed a cop that would cut through the bullshit and basically do what needed to be done. That's very much in line with Black Adam and his way of thinking. I think that's appealing to pretty much everybody. Everybody knows how the world sometimes is not fair, and you need people that break the rules to even out the playing field." Johnson remarked that "the Black in Black Adam refers to his soul", and described his worldview as "myopic", adding that for Adam, "There's no room or space for him being wrong. There's no room or space for anyone else's opinion. There's only room and space for him to justify anything that he does because of his pain. And he pushes and pushes and pushes and does not see any other way. It's very black and white."

The next month, Warner Bros. adjusted their upcoming release schedule due to the pandemic, leaving Black Adam without a release date. Later in October, Sarah Shahi joined the cast as Adrianna Tomaz. Quintessa Swindell was cast as Cyclone in December, with Marwan Kenzari joining the cast in February 2021. Filming was expected to begin that April, with the construction of the sets beginning by mid-March. Pierce Brosnan was cast as Kent Nelson / Doctor Fate at the end of March, and the film was given a new release date of July 29, 2022. In April, James Cusati-Moyer, Bodhi Sabongui, Mo Amer, and Uli Latukefu joined the cast in undisclosed roles. Latukefu previously worked with Johnson on the series Young Rock, while Sabongui's character was described as a key role from the Black Adam comics.

Henry Cavill reprises his role as Superman from other DCEU films during the film's mid-credits scene; this marks his first time shooting material as the character since Justice League (2017). The idea of Cavill being in the film was openly teased by Johnson back in November 2021. Johnson stated that Seven Bucks Productions, including himself, Dany Garcia, and Hiram Garcia, played an integral role in the re-negotiations between Warner Bros. and Cavill. Johnson originally pitched the idea for Cavill to reprise his role to DC Films president Walter Hamada, who rejected the idea due to his plans for different Superman projects. With the mediation of Johnson, Cavill, who had been working on production for The Witcher at the time, negotiated a "one-off deal" with Warner Bros. Discovery, that he signed over the Labor Day holiday of 2022, and was paid $250,000 for his involvement. Johnson and his team had spent years since 2019 attempting to negotiate with Warner Bros. To include Cavill in the film. By the time it was approved, the ability to include Cavill in any capacity was limited to the credits scene due to the film having already achieved picture lock when the cameo was shot.

=== Filming ===
Principal photography began on April 10, 2021, at Trilith Studios in Atlanta, Georgia, with Lawrence Sher serving as cinematographer after previously shooting DC's Joker (2019). Filming was delayed from an initial July 2020 start due to the COVID-19 pandemic. Johnson said on June 20, 2021, that there were three weeks left of filming, and on July 15 he announced that he had completed his scenes. Filming then continued without Johnson for several weeks, with the production moving to Los Angeles, and had wrapped by August 15.

The mid-credits scene was filmed in parts, with Johnson filming it at the end of a day of reshoots and additional photography. The next part was filmed using a body double, without showing the actor's face. Sher said this version of the scene was included in test screening, to positive reactions, prompting a renewed push to include Cavill. Johnson approached Warner Bros. Motion Picture Group co-chairmen Michael De Luca and Pamela Abdy, who approved the idea. The final version of the scene was shot remotely in London in September 2022, a month before the film's premiere, and was overseen by producer Hiram Garcia. The credits scene that included Cavill had many different iterations that were shot over many different takes. Each one was carefully considered by editors, with input from Cavill himself, before the final version that made the final cut of the film.

=== Post-production ===
Bill Westenhofer serves as the visual effects supervisor for the film, after doing so for the DCEU film Wonder Woman (2017), while John Lee and Michael L. Sale are the editors. Visual effects vendors included Wētā FX, UPP, Scanline VFX, Digital Domain, DNEG, Rodeo VFX, Lola VFX, Cantina Creative, Tippett Studio, and EDI Effetti Digitali Italiani. Wētā worked on the final battle sequence, which contains many shots that were entirely digital.

In March 2022, Warner Bros. adjusted its release schedule due to the impacts of COVID-19 on the workload of visual effects vendors. Black Adam was pushed back to October 21, 2022, with The Flash and Aquaman and the Lost Kingdom moved from late 2022 into 2023 to allow time for their visual effects work to be completed. The delay for Black Adam was also reportedly due to reshoots that were scheduled for February 2022 having to be postponed because most of the studio space at Trilith was being taken up by production on Guardians of the Galaxy Vol. 3 (2023). Once shooting for that film ended, reshoots for Black Adam began in early May, and had concluded early the next month. Initially greenlit on a $190 million budget, the final cost of the film ballooned to as much as $260 million due to the reshoots. Collet-Serra confirmed that work on the film had been completed with a picture lock being achieved by July 2022.

Final writing credits were given to Sztykiel, Haines, and Noshirvani, while an additional literary material credit was attributed to David Leslie Johnson-McGoldrick who scribed DC's Aquaman (2018). In October 2022, Djimon Hounsou and Jennifer Holland were revealed to be reprising their respective DCEU roles as Shazam and Emilia Harcourt, the former from Shazam! (2019), and the latter from The Suicide Squad (2021) and the first season of Peacemaker. The film initially received an R rating due to several gruesome death scenes and many cuts had to be made to the film to receive the lower PG-13 rating.

== Music ==
Lorne Balfe, who previously wrote additional music for DC's The Dark Knight Trilogy and composed the music for The Lego Batman Movie (2017), composed the score for the film. Black Adam and the Justice Society's themes were released by WaterTower Music as singles on September 30 and October 5, 2022, respectively, and the full soundtrack was released on October 21. A rendition of John Williams' Superman (1978) theme is played during the mid-credits scene, which Cavill said was selected over Hans Zimmer's Man of Steel (2013) theme because it was more recognizable to audiences.

== Marketing ==
Johnson promoted the film at the virtual DC FanDome event in August 2020, revealing concept art and narrating an animated teaser for the film as well as announcing which members of the JSA would be appearing. The film's new July 2022 release date was announced on March 28, 2021, with another teaser narrated by Johnson that was aired ahead of an NCAA Basketball Regional semi-final game and also announced during a "takeover" of New York's Times Square. Carly Lane at Collider described the Times Square event as thrilling, while CNET's Mark Serrels said "booming it over a giant speaker in Times Square" was a "very cool way to announce a movie's release date". The film was promoted at the 2021 DC FanDome in October, with Johnson revealing an opening scene for the film introducing himself as Black Adam. Tom Reimann of Collider was excited to finally see footage from the film after its long development history, and said "looks like Dwayne Johnson in a superhero movie, which is to say it looks awesome". Both TheWrap's Ross A. Lincoln and The A.V. Club's William Hughes highlighted the short scene's violence, while Matt Patches at Polygon compared the footage's tone to the Mummy franchise.

In February 2022, more footage from the film was released as part of a showreel for Warner Bros.' 2022 slate of DC films, which also included The Batman, The Flash, and Aquaman and the Lost Kingdom (before the last two were delayed to 2023 in March). Johnson, Centineo, and Swindell promoted the film at Warner Bros.' CinemaCon panel in April 2022, where a teaser trailer was launched. The first official trailer was released on June 8, featuring an orchestral remix of Kanye West and Jay-Z's song "Murder to Excellence" (2011). Jennifer Bisset at CNET wrote that the trailer posed Black Adam as a character who "must choose between being a hero or villain – and it looks like he takes the darker path, judging by his take on the question of whether heroes kill people". Both Maggie Lovvit from Collider and Charles Pulliam-Moore from The Verge also noted Adam's brutality in the trailer. Pulliam-Moore felt that the death of Adam's son "radicalizes him and emboldens him to use his newfound powers to seek a kind of justice so brutal that those around him are forced to lock him away". Lovvit opined that Adam's morality exists "within the grey area between black and white" and was excited at seeing the character's future in the DCEU. Writing for IGN, Rosie Knight also felt that it showed Adam's "tragic" backstory, speculating that it could take inspiration from the New 52 iteration of the character, and that it would determine his future actions.

Collet-Serra and the cast promoted the film in the 2022 San Diego Comic-Con and revealed exclusive footage for the film. Scottie Andrew of CNN compared the footage to that of Shazam! Fury of the Gods (2023), calling it "somehow even moodier". Charles Pulliam-More from The Verge felt the footage depicted Adam as a villain rather than an antihero, noting how the Justice Society of America (JSA) "seem much more keen on stopping him than trying to recruit him to their ranks." Similarly, Pete Volk of Polygon also highlighted Adam's confrontation with the JSA. Germain Lussier of Gizmodo praised the action sequences in the trailer, calling it an "action-packed little sizzle". DC Comics published a series of one-shots focusing on each member of the JSA, titled Black Adam – The Justice Society Files, beginning on July 5 and concluding on October 4. Each issue also features a variant cover of the JSA members as they are depicted in the film. The film partnered with ZOA Energy Drinks for an exclusive edition at the 2022 San Diego Comic-Con.

== Release ==
=== Theatrical ===
Black Adam had its world premiere in Mexico City on October 3, 2022, and had screenings in New York City, Toronto, London, Atlanta, Miami, Madrid and Los Angeles between October 12 and 20, before being theatrically released in the United States on October 21, by Warner Bros. Pictures. It was originally set for release on December 22, 2021, but was moved from that date due to the COVID-19 pandemic. It was then given a July 29, 2022, release date, but was moved to the October 2022 date when Warner Bros. adjusted its release schedule due to the impacts of COVID-19 on the workload of visual effects vendors.

=== Home media ===
The film was released for VOD platforms on November 22, 2022 and on HBO Max on December 16. It ranked first on iTunes for its first two weeks of release, and on Google Play and Vudu for the first four weeks. It also debuted at the first position on Redbox's digital charts. According to Samba TV, the film was streamed by 1.2 million US viewers on HBO Max over the first three days, lagging behind the viewership of many other recent superhero films.

The DVD, Blu-ray, and 4K versions were later released on January 3, 2023. The premium version of the VOD release, along with the 4K and the Blu-ray combo packs, includes ten special features. It was the highest-selling title on physical media in the U.S. for the month according to The NPD Group.

== Reception ==
=== Box office ===
Black Adam grossed $168.2 million in the United States and Canada, and $225.1 million in other territories, for a worldwide total of $393.3 million.

In the U.S. and Canada, Black Adam was released alongside Ticket to Paradise and The Banshees of Inisherin, and was projected to earn $58–68 million from 4,402 theaters in its opening weekend. The film made $26.7 million on its first day, including $7.6 million from Thursday night previews, besting the opening day of Shazam! ($20.4 million). It went on to gross $67 million during the opening weekend, the highest of Johnson's leading career, while also ranking first at the box office. This was also the fifth-highest October opening weekend ever for a film. In its sophomore weekend, the film dropped 59% to $27.5 million, remaining in the first position. During the third weekend, the film grossed $18.3 million for a drop of 33%. In the fourth weekend, it earned $8.1 million for a drop of 56%, while being displaced from the first position by Black Panther: Wakanda Forever.

Outside the U.S. and Canada, Black Adam earned $75.9 million from 76 countries over its first five days of release. It had the third-highest opening for a Warner Bros. title in Latin America during the pandemic era. In Malaysia ($2.2 million), Indonesia ($2.9 million), and the Philippines ($1 million), it had the highest opening for a Warner Bros. title during the pandemic. Taiwan ($2 million) had the biggest opening for a Warner Bros. film in 2022 and the second-biggest of Johnson's leading career. In Brazil ($4.9 million), it had the second-biggest opening for a Warner Bros. film during the pandemic, while also going on to generate the fifth-biggest opening ever for a Warner Bros. title in India ($3.5 million). In the second weekend it earned $39 million for a drop of 45%, while in the third weekend it grossed $26.2 million for a drop of 34%. In the fourth weekend it grossed $9.3 million for a drop of 63%. In Japan it opened to a $1.2 million weekend.

Several publications described the film as a box office bomb, with The Hollywood Reporter stating that the film "will be lucky to break even, even considering ancillary revenue." Variety estimated that it would lose $50–100 million against a break-even point of $600 million. Warner Bros. contradicted the claim, stating that the initial break even cost was $450 million, but that figure had come down due to the growth of ancillary revenue streams from home media and the marketing cost being low. Deadline Hollywood estimated that the film would ultimately turn a profit of $52–72 million due to a smaller estimated marketing budget of $80–100 million (thanks in part to Johnson's social media accounts handling large amounts of the marketing), increase in ancillary revenues from PVOD and streaming, and no one receiving any share from the box office gross. A later report by Puck stated that several Warner executives suspected Johnson and his team of leaking a purported financial sheet to Deadline Hollywood which contained inaccurate figures, including the marketing budget, exaggerated home entertainment revenue, and an inaccurate interest rate for the film.

=== Critical response ===
Black Adam has had mixed to negative reviews, (Note: Some publications labeled the film's overall reception as mixed, while other publications said the reaction was more negative.) with J. Kim Murphy of Variety noting that critics generally found the film to be "repetitive and anti-entertaining". On Rotten Tomatoes, the film holds an approval rating of 39% based on 307 reviews, with an average rating of 5.1/10. The website's critics' consensus reads, "Black Adam may end up pointing the way to an exciting future for DC films, but as a standalone experience, it's a wildly uneven letdown." On Metacritic, the film has a weighted average score of 41 out of 100, based on 52 critics, indicating "mixed or average" reviews. Audiences polled by CinemaScore gave the film an average grade of "B+" on an A+ to F scale, while those at PostTrak gave it 4 out of 5 stars.

Katie Walsh of the Los Angeles Times wrote, "The director does heroic work crafting a film around Johnson that is fast and entertaining." Writing for Consequence, Liz Shannon Miller gave the film a B grade and said, "On its own merits, Black Adam might feel a little thin in terms of story, but it does deliver plenty of enjoyable moments and a solid ensemble to back up Johnson. But perhaps the most exciting aspect of it is how it might shake up the rest of the franchise going forward." Helen O'Hara of Empire rated it 3 out of 5, and wrote that the film attempts "to offer a grand unified theory of DC, mixing family-film tropes with a protagonist who straight-up murders people. The result is sometimes a mess, but it's a generally entertaining one." Todd McCarthy of Deadline Hollywood praised Johnson's performance and the action scenes, writing, "The visual spectacle just keeps coming at you for two hours, and the effects are all so stupendous that you could begin to take it for granted. Practically every shot features something epic or at least unusual going on and director Jaume Collet-Serra, who guided Johnson's [2021] hit Jungle Cruise, takes good care to present the star in the most favorable dramatic light."

Maya Phillips of The New York Times was more critical in her review, calling the film "a dull, listless superhero movie that hits all the expected touchstones of the genre under the guise of a transgressive new antihero story." Rachel LaBonte of Screen Rant gave the film a 2.5 out of 5 and wrote, "Though suffering from repetitive plot beats and thin characters, Black Adam is powered by Johnson's performance and its promise of an exciting future." TheWrap's Alonso Duralde called the film a "muddled, overstuffed origin story", and wrote, "Most disappointing of all, Black Adam is one of the most visually confounding of the major-studio superhero sagas, between CG that's assaultively unappealing and rapid-fire editing that sucks the exhilaration right out of every fight scene."

=== Accolades ===
| Award | Date of ceremony | Category | Recipient | Result | Ref. |
|---|---|---|---|---|---|
| Black Reel Awards | February 6, 2023 | Outstanding Breakthrough Performance, Male | Quintessa Swindell | Nominated | |
| Golden Trailer Awards | June 29, 2023 | Best Action Poster | "Payoff" (WORKS ADV) | Nominated | |
| Golden Trailer Awards | June 29, 2023 | Best Wildposts | Black Adam (WORKS ADV) | Nominated | |
| Hollywood Music in Media Awards | November 16, 2022 | Best Original Score in a Sci-Fi Film | Lorne Balfe | Nominated | |
| Irish Film & Television Awards | May 7, 2023 | Best Supporting Actor | Pierce Brosnan | Nominated | |
| Nickelodeon Kids' Choice Awards | March 4, 2023 | Favorite Movie | Black Adam | Nominated | |
| Nickelodeon Kids' Choice Awards | March 4, 2023 | Favorite Movie Actor | Dwayne Johnson | Won | |
| People's Choice Awards | December 6, 2022 | The Action Movie of 2022 | Black Adam | Nominated | |
| People's Choice Awards | December 6, 2022 | The Male Movie Star of 2022 | Dwayne Johnson | Nominated | |
| People's Choice Awards | December 6, 2022 | Tar Heel Award | Dwayne Johnson | Nominated | |
| Visual Effects Society Awards | February 15, 2023 | Outstanding Special (Practical) Effects in a Photoreal or Animated Project | J. D. Schwalm, Nick Rand, Andrew Hyde, and andyRobot | Nominated | |

== Future ==
In February 2015, Johnson told Total Film that Black Adam would fight Superman or Batman in the future. In April 2017, he stated that DC Films planned to have Black Adam and Shazam appearing in a future film together. Henry Cavill, who portrayed Superman in the DCEU, said in April 2018 that there were plans for Johnson's Black Adam to face off against Superman in the future, though he believed that it will take place after Black Adam and Shazam collide.

Dany Garcia stated in May 2021 that Johnson and the other producers planned to make multiple Black Adam films during their "long-term relationship with DC", and Hiram Garcia reiterated in July that there was potential for Cavill and Johnson to appear in a future project together as Superman and Black Adam. That November, Hiram elaborated that they had an outline for future films and spin-offs featuring Black Adam and the JSA, dependent on the first film being a success; he later added that other characters beyond Shazam and Superman were being considered as potential future rivals for Black Adam such as Wonder Woman.

In October 2022, Johnson confirmed plans for Black Adam to fight Superman in the DCEU, and reaffirmed plans for the character to crossover with Shazam. In a separate interview, Johnson stated that the character will interact with various characters within the DCEU continuity, while there were also options for iterations of characters that exist in their separate universes (namely The Batman and Joker) to crossover through a multiversal scenario. Furthermore, he said that Black Adam serves as the first film in Phase One of a new storytelling initiative in the DCEU. Johnson also confirmed that despite the events of the film, Doctor Fate will return in the future of the franchise.

Producers Hiram Garcia and Beau Flynn later confirmed to ComicBook.com that a sequel was planned and that it was intended to be fast-tracked into production, serving as a buildup to the duel between Superman and Black Adam. Cavill himself confirmed his resumed involvement in the DCEU as a whole on October 24, stating that his mid-credits cameo appearance in Black Adam was "just a very small taste of things to come". In December, producer and financier Joe Singer told Deadline Hollywood that he believed the film would turn a profit through PVOD and home media sales, furthermore stating that Warner Bros. Discovery was still in talks for a sequel. Later that month, Cavill announced that he would no longer play Superman, as DC Studios co-CEO James Gunn intended to reboot the character in the future.

Also that month, Johnson confirmed that a Black Adam sequel was not in Gunn's immediate plans, though he added that he and Warner Bros. would "continue exploring the most valuable ways Black Adam can be utilized in future DC multiverse chapters". Gunn reciprocated by saying that he looked forward to future collaborations with Johnson and Seven Bucks Productions. In August 2023, Johnson stated that he believed the film did not get a sequel due to multiple changes of the leadership at Warner Bros. Discovery. In November 2025, Brosnan revealed during an interview with the United Kingdom edition of the GQ magazine that Doctor Fate had been originally planned to have his own spin-off television series or film after Black Adam and that he had heard that he was going to be in the new Superman, still being willing to reprise the role for the DC Universe (DCU).
