= Metropolis (British TV series) =

- VHS Box Art
- Genre: Thriller
- Written by: Peter Morgan
- Directed by: Glenn Wilhide; Tim Whitby
- Starring: Matthew Rhys; Louise Lombard; Jason Barry; Kris Marshall; Flora Montgomery; Emily Bruni; James Fox; James Purefoy
- Composer: Jonathan Whitehead
- Country of origin: United Kingdom
- Original language: English
- No. of seasons: 1
- No. of episodes: 5

Production
- Executive producer: Andy Harries
- Producer: Glenn Wilhide
- Production locations: London, United Kingdom
- Editor: Michael Parkinson
- Running time: 60 minutes (Eps. 1); 30 minutes (Eps. 2-8)
- Production company: Granada Television

Original release
- Network: ITV
- Release: 1 May – 15 May 2000

Metropolis is a five-part British television drama series, created and written by playwright Peter Morgan, that first broadcast on ITV on 1 May 2000. Produced and directed by Glenn Wilhide, and co-directed by Tim Whitby, the series follows a group of former university graduates who leave Leeds to start a new life in London. The series featured a notable cast including Matthew Rhys, Louise Lombard, Kris Marshall, Flora Montgomery, Emily Bruni, Jason Barry, James Fox and James Purefoy.

The series, described as "a more with-it Cold Feet", was produced by Granada Television, and broadcast over five nights, with the initial four hour-long episodes broadcasting on consecutive Mondays and Tuesdays at 10:00pm. The final, half-hour episode broadcast at 10:30pm on Monday 15 May. Music for the series was composed by Jonathan Whitehead. Despite gathering an adequate viewing audience, and moderately successful critical reviews, a second series was not commissioned, with the failure to be recommissioned blamed on "haphazard scheduling" and the change in episode length.

The series was later considered for an American re-make by Veronica Mars creator Rob Thomas, but the pilot episode, filmed in 2008, was not picked up by ABC. Similarly, Thomas tried to revive the project in 2012 with The CW, although once again, never made it past the pilot stage. The complete series was released as a double VHS on 16 June 2000. The VHS release combines all five episodes into two feature length presentations, of 115 and 90 minutes respectively.

== Critical reception ==
The Guardian described the series as a "stylish but trashy thriller", noting mixed reviews from other critics. A 2012 review of the fellow ITV series Love Life also described the series as "ITV's failed attempt to replicate the Cold Feet magic", and a "fairly standard flat share drama."

Eddie Holt of the Irish Times said of the first episode; "Metropolis is much more plot-driven than This Life and its narcissism is not as screaming. Written by Peter Morgan, who has travelled the drugs and rehab circuit, it displays an admirable knowingness in parts. Alastair, a sad buffoon really, has stolen cheques from his parents and is about to check into an expensive rehab clinic. But the thriller aspect of the series, pivoting on Nathan's stalking of Tanya, is too daft. More credible, given Charlotte's bedding by the wealthy sleazebag, is Matthew's loutish pursuit of frightened, but flattered, Sophie. Atmospheric "big city" shots – trains snaking between high-rise buildings; offices overlooking the bustle of the streets; commuters swarming from the Underground – supply mood and context. Likewise, individual scenes, such as Tanya's accident, partly shot from inside the crashed car."

"However, the social context of dynamic, thrusting females and work-shy, parasitic males seems overstated. Perhaps, as hyperbole, this is valid, but as actuality the gender contrast is hardly that stark yet, even among London's graduate twentysomethings. An eight-parter, airing twice weekly, Metropolis presents a cast of characters with obvious similarities to the first-year lawyers of This Life. Charlotte, stuck with a feckless, live-in lover, does a Milly by becoming involved with a powerful, older man. But her ambition also means that she's not unlike Anna, the Scottish siren whose appetite for men was surpassed only by her ruthlessness for career success."

"No doubt it was tempting to add a thriller dimension to the old formula. But the implausibility of the stalker sub-plot detracts from the aimed-for realism. Of the women, only Sophie, despite reneging spectacularly on her student vow to remain a lifelong socialist, elicits sympathy. The gap between university ideals and job-market realities has always hit twentysomethings, and the atomisation of student friends when career concerns kick-in is a valid theme. Even if you might envy the youth of this sextet, you'd be glad not to have to live their lives."

== Plot ==
We are introduced to the six-pack of Metropolis as they leave Leeds University. Cut to five years later. The three women, Charlotte (Louise Lombard), Sophie (Flora Montgomery) and Tanya (Emily Bruni) are, respectively, a junior financial hackette on a magazine, a researcher for the Conservative Party and an agony aunt. Only one of the men, Frank (Kris Marshall), works and he feels compelled to turn the tables on his insurance company employers. As an implausibly idealistic loss adjustor, he is disgusted by the company's scams to avoid pay-outs. He fiddles the claims in favour of the claimants. Matthew (Matthew Rhys) and Alastair (Jason Barry) have remained dope-smoking slackers. Ambitious Charlotte lives with indolent Matthew. Charlotte acts like a junior Sue Ellen Ewing – many lip gymnastics and soulful stares.

Mind you, unlike the richter-scale efforts of Texan Sue Ellen, Charlotte's lip tremors are tiny English quivers. Anyway, she cheats on Matthew and takes up with sixty-two-year-old billionaire lecher Milton Friedkin (James Fox). He feeds her career-enhancing stories and she feeds him her twenty-seven-year-old nubility. Primed by her sugar daddy, she gets her "first official byline". Meanwhile, Tanya is in a car crash. When she wakes up in hospital, a stalker, Nathan (James Purefoy) is managing, quite successfully and utterly unbelievably, to convince her that he is her boyfriend. The crash must have caused selective amnesia, he tells her. Fancying the nutter, she goes along with it in spite of the warnings of Sophie. As an agony aunt, she'd better write a letter to herself pretty quickly, because this one looks like it's going to end in tears if not worse.

== Cast ==
- Matthew Rhys as Matthew Bishop; a law ethics graduate
- Louise Lombard as Charlotte Owen; a reporter for a financial newspaper
- Kris Marshall as Frank Green; an intern insurance claims broker
- Jason Barry as Alistair Hibbert; an alcoholic drug addict
- Flora Montgomery as Sophie Hamilton; junior political researcher
- Emily Bruni as Tanya Rubens; agony aunt for a local radio station
- James Fox as Milton Friedkin; a wealthy banker
- James Purefoy as Nathan; a sociopath who begins to stalk Tanya
- Michael Elphick as Andrew Kaplan; Frank Green's boss
- Alexi Kaye Campbell as David Manning; Sophie Hamilton's boss
- John McArdle as Steve Norris; Alastair's rehab councillor
- Anna Nygh as Eleanor Scott; party rival of David Manning
- Gina Bellman as Clara Keshishian; a wealthy Jewish widow

== Episodes ==
No.	Title	Directed by	Written by	Original release date	UK viewers (millions)
1	"Episode 1"	Glenn Wilhide	Peter Morgan	1 May 2000	5.47
Having been in a relationship since graduation, Matthew and Charlotte find themselves growing apart. Charlotte finds herself entailed with wealthy banker Milton Friedkin, who is prepared to give her the insider knowledge required to help her work way up the ladder at the financial newspaper where she works. Frank, an intern insurance broker dealing with claims submitted as a result of burglary or theft, is given a stern warning by his boss for failing to meet company targets. Dismayed by the treatment he has received, Frank decides to help out an elderly customer whose claim the company are unwilling to uphold. Sophie, a junior researcher for a prominent Conservative MP, seizes the opportunity to help the party regain power in parliament following comments made a Labour minister which suggested that German politicians are untrustworthy. Alastair, short of money and about to be evicted, decides to marry a Polish national for money to help her get a visa to remain in Britain. Tanya finds herself in hospital following a horror car crash.
2	"Episode 2"	Glenn Wilhide	Peter Morgan	2 May 2000	N/A
Following Hammond's speech in Parliament, Sophie is dismissed by her senior researcher. Determined to exact revenge, she seeks employment from fellow Conservative MP, and Hammond's rival, Eleanor Scott. Frank tries to help out a butcher whose business is set to go under over an unpaid electricity bill. Alastair tries to convince his parents to lend him the money to check himself into rehab. Matthew organises a susprise party for Charlotte's birthday, but is dismayed when she fails to return to home, and then sends Sophie to collect her belongings. Tanya begins to suspect that Nathan is feeding her a pack of lies, a suspicion further heightened when Sophie discovers her diary is missing.
3	"Episode 3"	Glenn Wilhide	Peter Morgan	8 May 2000	N/A
Tanya apologises to Nathan for her erratic behaviour, but when he angrily reacts to the news that her newfound admiration comes only from discovering her missing diary, Tanya stars to believe her suspicions about him being a phony may have been correct all along. Frank is warned by his boss to void a £500,000 life insurance policy or risk losing his job. Matthew and Sophie finally give into temptation and consummate their budding relationship. Milton proposes to Charlotte, which somehow only results in her realising how much she loves Matthew and badly wants him back. Despite initial relisiance, Alastair struggles in the light of criticism from his fellow inmates in rehab and decides to jump ship.
4	"Episode 4"	Glenn Wilhide	Peter Morgan	9 May 2000	N/A
Tanya heightens security on her flat after discovering a string of telephone calls made by Nathan to the radio station where she works. Frank and Clara plot to split the earnings from her late husband's life insurance policy, forcing Frank to make a brave attempt to get his boss to sign off on the claim. Sophie admits to Matthew that she fell for him from the moment he began dating Charlotte. Alastair's first day out of rehab unsurprisingly ends at the bottom of a beer can. Charlotte's plans to reconcile with Matthew are halted when she arrives home to find him snogging Sophie, which results in an unexpected acceptance of Milton's proposal. Matthew admits to Sophie that he doesn't really love her.
5	"Episode 5"	Tim Whitby	Peter Morgan	15 May 2000	N/A
Tanya is shocked to discover that Nathan has been hiding out in her flat. Frank pre-empts Clara's intentions to scam him out of his half of the earnings and concocts a cunning plan to walk away with the full £500,000. As Charlotte prepares for her wedding to Milton, Matthew prepares to make the biggest gamble of his life. Sophie tries to pre-warn Milton of Matthew's plan. Nathan admits to stalking Tanya, but having been caught out, decides to take his own life to prevent being arrested by the police. Matthew arrives at the hotel, posing as Charlotte's chauffeur. Arriving at the registry office, she makes the shocking decision to leave Milton behind and drive off with Matthew into the sunset.
