= Eaten by Lions =

2019 comedy film directed by Jason Wingard

- Film poster
- Directed by: Jason Wingard
- Written by: Jason Wingard; David Isaac
- Produced by: Chris Bouckley; Matt Carroll; Neil Jones; Hannah Stevenson
- Starring: Antonio Aakeel; Jack Carroll; Asim Chaudhry; Johnny Vegas; Vicki Pepperdine; Kevin Eldon
- Cinematography: Matt North
- Edited by: Andrew McKee; Jason Wingard
- Music by: Dan Baboulene
- Production company: Mecca Films
- Release date: 29 March 2019
- Running time: 99 minutes
- Country: United Kingdom
- Language: English

Eaten by Lions is a 2019 British comedy film written and directed by Jason Wingard. The film stars Antonio Aakeel as Omar and Jack Carroll as Pete. The film is the feature-length adaptation of the director's 2013 short film 'Going to Mecca' which won best comedy at the Manchester International Film Festival. The feature follows half-brothers Omar and Pete as they embark on a journey to find Omar's estranged father, confronting him on the day of his daughter's engagement party.

The film released in UK cinemas on 29 March 2019 following its successful premiere at the Edinburgh International Film Festival June 2018 and was screened as part of the Bagri Foundation London Indian Film Festival June 2018, winning the audience choice award for best film.

== Plot ==
Half-brothers Pete and Omar's parents are eaten by lions when their hot air balloon crashes in a safari park, so their grandmother takes them in. When she dies she leaves Omar info about his father kept secret from him.

The boys' aunt Ellen and uncle Ken take in Peter easily, but are icy to Omar as he's half Indian and not related by blood. After announcing they'd like to adopt Peter only, Omar decides it's one snub too many. Heading to gram's old apartment, Pete follows close behind.

Omar announces he is embarking on a journey to Blackpool in search of his estranged father, he eventually lets Pete tag along. Shortly after arriving, as Pete is lying on the beach, Omar is off getting a treat. He meets pink-haired Amy, one of an array of colourful characters they meet on their travels.

When he gets back to the beach, Omar finds the tide has come in. Pete had fallen asleep and Omar's suitcase containing their cash got washed out too far for him to retrieve it. Broke, they looked for Amy at Sea Planet. She takes them to her uncle Ray's guesthouse and he lets them stay for free.

The boys go to the pier to spread their gram's ashes and again come across Malik's address. After some confusion, it's discovered that Malik' brother Irfan gave his name to Omar's mother Karen. The boys are invited to stay for the engagement luncheon of Malik's oldest daughter Nadia.

At the meal they are introduced around. Parveen, the second daughter, is mute and takes a strong liking to Pete. When the patriarch of the family Saftar arrives and finds out Irfan falsely used Malik's name and fathered a son, he punishes him like a child. And Irfan has a childlike temper tantrum.

Parveen follows Pete to the upstairs bathroom, and she shows she's not mute. When he asks her why, she explains she's trying to stay as invisible as possible to her family 'like a ninja'. She stops flirting with Pete when her dad appears.

Back at Ray's, Omar sneaks out to meet Amy at the pier. He remembers when his parents died how their aunt and uncle only wanted Pete, which is why their gram took them. When Amy arrives, they get to know each other better along the shore.

When Omar returns, Pete is up and angry at him as he'd feared he'd been abandoned. Ray is with him, and accuses Omar to be up to mischief. Omar apologises, promising he won't abandon Pete. The next day Irfan takes them out in Blackpool to see the family's Pakistani-Indian shop, the arcade and a show of people in drag.

Omar and Pete stay over in Saftar's so Irfan can continue bonding with his son. Pete wakes to Parveen cuddling with him in bed, so he screams alerting the whole house. Omar loses his temper, accusing him of being a burden. Soon Ellen and Ken turn up, Omar takes off and the racist aunt says they'll leave without him.

Meanwhile, Amy comforts Omar at the pier. Pete and Parveen go joyriding in Saftar's restored car and stay out all night partying. First Omar and Amy, then Pete, Parveen and a lot of people party in the house. When the family returns they find the car crashed into the house, a rager and a very drunk Parveen vomiting on a cop and breaking her silence with a slew of profanity.

Pete is taken away by Ellen and Ken and Omar is turned out too. Irfan comes looking for Omar, offering him a key to his annex. They go together to spring Pete out, offering room in the annex. At Nadia's wedding is the whole array of colourful characters.

== Cast ==
- Antonio Aakeel as Omar
- Jack Carroll as Pete
- Asim Chaudhry as Irfan
- Johnny Vegas as Ray
- Vicki Pepperdine as Ellen
- Kevin Eldon as Ken
- Sarah Hoare as Amy
- Nitin Ganatra as Malik
- Tom Binns as Fortune Teller
- Darshan Jariwala as Saftar
- Stephanie Fayerman as Gran
- Natalie Davies as Parveen
- Hayley Tamaddon as Sara
- Phil Ellis as Ice Cream Man
- Shila Iqbal as Nadia
- Naithan Ariane as Sadiq
- Steve Cain as Kev
- Christopher Hollinshead as Mike
- Daniel Wallace as Stacey
- Jason Redshaw as Tooty Frooty
- Thomas Mark Shannon as Party Member

== Production ==
Eaten by Lions was developed by Mecca Films with principal photography beginning in April 2017.

== Reception ==
On Rotten Tomatoes the film has an approval rating of 100% based on reviews from 12 critics.
