= Cyclone (DC Comics) =

Superheroine in DC Comics comic books

- Cyclone as she appears in JSA All-Stars #12. Art by Howard Porter (pencils) and Art Thibert (inks and color).

Publication information
- Publisher: DC Comics
- First appearance: Justice Society of America (2007) #1 (February 2007)
- Created by: Mark Waid; Alex Ross

In-story information
- Alter ego: Maxine Hunkel
- Species: Metahuman
- Team affiliations: JSA All-Stars; Justice Society of America
- Partnerships: Stargirl (Courtney Whitmore); King Chimera
- Notable aliases: Cyclone; Witch of the Winds
- Abilities: Aerokinesis; Flight; Genius-level intelligence

Cyclone is a superheroine appearing in American comic books published by DC Comics. Based on a character created by Mark Waid and Alex Ross, who debuted in Kingdom Come #2 (June 1996), the mainstream version debuted over a decade later in Justice Society of America (2007) #1, created by Geoff Johns, Dale Eaglesham, and Art Thibert. Since her debut, the character has remained a recurring roster member of the Justice Society of America.

The character's alter-ego is Maxine Hunkel, the granddaughter of the original Red Tornado, Ma Hunkel, and the niece of the Cyclone Kids, and an avid fan of the Justice Society of America. Once kidnapped by supervillain T. O. Morrow and infected with nanites as a child, her powers awakened with wind manipulation while attending Harvard University at nineteen years old. Not long after, Maxine is among the prospective younger heroes recruited into the Justice Society of America, adopting the codename Cyclone. Inspired by her grandmother to being a superhero, the character has a public identity and has a genius-level intellect. She is also known for her perky, bubbly personality and admiration for The Wizard of Oz franchise.

The character made her live-action debut in the DC Extended Universe film Black Adam, played by Quintessa Swindell.

== Publication history ==
While unnamed at the time, the character that would eventually become known as "Maxine Hunkel" first appeared as a newer version of Red Tornado in Kingdom Come #2 (June 1996) by writer Mark Waid and artist Alex Ross. A little over a decade later in 2007, just prior to the relaunch of the Justice Society of America series, writer Geoff Johns created Maxine Hunkel, a hero who would follow the legacy of the Red Tornado. While discussing the new character with Ross, Johns told him about the Red Tornado character he had and eventually, the character would be retroactively made one and the same. Maxine would then make her mainline DC Universe debut in Justice Society of America (vol. 3) #1 (February 2007), appearing as a regularly reoccurring roster member of the eponymous super-hero team. She would later make appearance in the 2010 JSA All Stars comic book title until its cancellation for The New 52.

== Characterization ==
The character is described to be extremely intelligent and bubbly in personality while also having a social justice mindset as a superhero. Her debut story portrays her as a nineteen year old Harvard University student, a avid fan of the Justice Society of America (Stargirl in particular), and is a Wizard of Oz fanatic. She would also have a pet monkey named Frankie.

=== Fictional character biography ===
The granddaughter of Ma Hunkel, the original Red Tornado and honorary member of the Justice Society of America who became the caretaker of their Brownstone headquarters, she is also the niece of Hunkel's sidekicks, the Cyclone Kids. Idolizing the JSA in her youth, she was once kidnapped by T. O. Morrow and experimented on with nanites before being rescued. By the age of nineteen, she attended Harvard University as a freshmen but developed depression, as her personality proved annoying to her peers. Shortly after manifesting her powers she is invited into the Justice Society of America by Power Girl and Mister Terrific. Meeting Stargirl on her first day, she is given a costume and chooses a codename honoring her relatives. As a member, Maxine aids the team on numerous occasions, adopts a pet monkey, and later joins the JSA All Stars, engaging in a romance while continuing her studies.

Following The New 52, the characters' history is altered and is initially erased. However, she returns in "Doomsday Clock" alongside many other superheroes when Doctor Manhattan undoes the changes he made to the timeline. In Cyclone's revised history, her time with the JSA All Stars is absent. Cyclone was among the JSA members present during the "Dark Crisis" after the founding members of the Justice League were apparently killed by Pariah. She also aids the team in battling the Legion of Super-Heroes when they were covertly manipulated by Eclipso. During DC All In, she is placed in the reserve list but aids them once more when Doctor Fate seeks reinforcements against the Injustice Society.

=== Power and abilities ===
Implanted with T.O. Morrow's nanites, Maxine later awakens her powers of aerokinesis, giving her the power to manipulate wind and air mentally, able to create cyclones, whirlwinds, and allow for flight. In addition to her powers, the character possess a genius level intellect, remarked to having an IQ of 142, and is knowledgeable in various sciences.

== Other versions ==
- Prior to her mainstream debut, Cyclone appeared in Kingdom Come as an enemy, later member, of Superman's Justice League.
- An alternate universe version of Cyclone appears in Trinity as a member of Justice Society International who is later killed by a sniper.

== In other media ==
- Cyclone appears in Black Adam, portrayed by Quintessa Swindell.
  - In the Black Adam tie-in comic Black Adam: The Justice Society Files: Cyclone, Maxine Hunkel appears as a avid fan of the Justice Society with dreams of being a superhero. Granted aerokinetic powers after being kidnapped by scientists, she used her powers to aid her neighborhood and law enforcement before joining the Justice Society.
