= Del Dingle =

Fictional character from Emmerdale

- Emmerdale character
- Portrayed by: Hayley Tamaddon
- Duration: 2005–2007
- First appearance: 15 July 2005
- Last appearance: 11 May 2007
- Introduced by: Keith Richardson
In-universe information
- Other names: Delilah Dingle
- Occupation: Seamstress
- Father: Zebediah Dingle
- Mother: Colleen Dingle
- Sisters: Lilith Dingle
- Grandfathers: Jedediah Dingle
- Grandmothers: Peg Dingle
- Uncles: Zak Dingle; Shadrach Dingle; Albert Dingle; Caleb Dingle; Ezra Dingle
- Nephews: Luke Dingle; Matthew Dingle; Mark Dingle
- Nieces: Jon Dingle
- First cousins: Ben Dingle; Butch Dingle; Cain Dingle; Chas Dingle; Sam Dingle; Genesis Walker; Belle Dingle; Mandy Dingle; Marlon Dingle; Eli Dingle; Charity Dingle
- Other relatives: Debbie Dingle; Sarah Sugden; Jack Sugden; Aaron Livesy

Del Dingle is a fictional character from the British ITV soap opera Emmerdale, played by Hayley Tamaddon. She made her first on-screen appearance during the episode broadcast on 15 July 2005.

== Casting ==
On 1 June 2005, Kris Green of Digital Spy reported Delilah, the 30th Dingle family member to be introduced, would be introduced the following month. Calling her an "impulsive newcomer", Green said Delilah would arrive in the village wearing her wedding dress, after she jilts her fiancé. Tamaddon was cast in the role of Delilah and she said "I'm really excited to be playing Delilah. She is an ambitious and impulsive character and I can't wait to see what she will be getting up to." Tamaddon made her debut screen appearance as Delilah on 15 July 2005.

In January 2007, it was announced Tamaddon had decided to leave Emmerdale. The actress explained she had had an amazing time playing Delilah, but she was looking forward to what the future holds. Series producer Kathleen Beedles said "Hayley's contract expires in the summer and she will be leaving in a hugely dramatic storyline, but the door will be left open for Delilah Dingle to return in the future." In January 2011, Tamaddon pondered Delilah's return to Emmerdale, saying "I think Delilah should make an appearance one day. Who knows? She might turn up with David Pollard's baby and demand a few more thousand." She has since stood by her idea and has remained keen to return to Emmerdale, stating in 2017 that the character should return with David's child.

== Storylines ==
Delilah sped into Emmerdale in a flash red sports car, wearing a wedding dress and refusing to explain why she was there. In fact, she was so determined not to answer any questions, she gave the Dingles a widescreen TV she'd been given as a wedding present to her uncle Zak so he would let her stay with him and his family. Her bewildered fiancé, Jay, arrived the next day. He was convinced that Del just had cold feet but she couldn't marry Jay. After much soul searching, Del realized he wasn't the man for her and gently told him they had no future together. Although hurt, Jay accepted Del's decision and they parted amicably.

Settling into life in Emmerdale, Del – a talented seamstress – helped Val and Eric start a soft furnishings business and became an integral part of the company. Del not only earned a living but also made friends with her colleagues, Sandra, Pearl Ladderbanks, and boss Val – helping her out of a number of scrapes. It was these friends who she turned to when her heart was broken just weeks later. Resident hunk Carl King was on the rebound, having loved and lost Del's cousin, Chas, he was single and the pair became friends. Del wanted the flirtatious banter between them to lead to romance but Carl had doubts. While on holiday in Spain, Carl rejected Del's advances. Although she was distraught, Del became Carl's best friend and when the pair had a one-night stand, Carl suggested giving romance a go but Del knew it wasn't right and helped him win back Chas. With Carl and Chas happily reconciled, Del tried to get on with life but her night with Carl came back to haunt her as Chas's son, Aaron, visited and discovered Carl's secret. He gleefully told his mother, wanting to cause maximum pain. Chas was furious but Del implored her not to give up the best man she'd ever been involved with. Chas and Carl soon became engaged.

Del was heartbroken to discover Alice Wilson, her cousin Sam's fiancée, had been told her cancer was terminal so she and Chas gave her a hen night to remember – although Del struggled to cope with the secret.

However, her own romantic life soon took centre stage again. Del got close to local vet Paddy Kirk after agreeing to adopt abandoned pooch, Titch. They started dating but this made Paddy's friend Toni Daggert decide she was in love with him and she set out to ruin their romance. Initially her schemes didn't work but after Toni enticed Paddy to spend more time with her than he did with Del, Del confronted Toni in the Woolpack kitchen. After a struggle, Toni was scalded with hot fat when a pan was knocked over, leaving her badly burned. Del was horrified at what had happened and called for help immediately but it was too late. Disgusted by Del's behaviour, Paddy dumped her and spent his time consoling Toni. Toni forgave Del for burning her – realising that it was a genuine accident.

David Metcalfe arrived in the village in November 2006, looking for his long-lost father and they took a shine to each other until Del realised that he thought her uncle Zak was his father and distanced herself. David's father was revealed to be Eric Pollard and they started planning to steal £20,000 from him in revenge for Eric stealing £20,000 from David's late mother, Lydia. But Chas saw David with her friend, Katie Sugden, one night and Katie admitted that they had had a one-night stand. Chas told Del, who confronted Katie, but directed her real revenge at David for lying to her. She changed their plan to steal the £20,000 slightly, convincing David to put the money in her account and he agreed. Once the money was in her account, she left the country, leaving David behind.
