= The Line of Freedom =

- Film poster
- Directed by: David Whitney
- Written by: David Whitney
- Produced by: Aly Doshambe; Bhawal Mengal; Noordin Mengal; Waqqas Qadir Sheikh; David Whitney
- Starring: Antonio Aakeel; Mansoor Alfeeli; Fatima Al Taei; Tony Hasnath; Omar Malik; Nitin Mirani; Omar Bin Haider; Ibrahim Renno
- Cinematography: Russell Nabb
- Edited by: Emma Collins
- Music by: Neil Haggerty
- Production company: DWF Films
- Release date: 22 November 2013
- Running time: 93 minutes
- Country: United Kingdom
- Language: English

The Line of Freedom is a 2013 political drama film directed and produced by David Whitney and starring Antonio Aakeel. The film had its world premiere at the Dubai International Film Festival in 2013. It was instantly banned in Pakistan due to the controversial depiction of its security forces and subsequently contributed to a national ban of the Internet Movie Database. The film has sparked a backlash from some titling it "anti-state propaganda" and resulted in its star Antonio Aakeel, and others who had helped in the production allegedly receiving death threats.

The film depicts the kidnapping of an activist by Pakistani Security Forces, his subsequent torture at their hands, and a failed attempt at executing in a desert location.

== Plot ==
The film follows the true story of Nasir Baloch, a young student rights activist murdered by Pakistani Security Forces in 2011 as part of their 'kill and dump' policy in Balochistan, southwest Pakistan. Nasir Baloch is abducted and tortured by his country's security forces. Days later, he is shot and left for dead in the desert, but incredibly survives to tell his story.

== Cast ==
- Antonio Aakeel as Nasir Baloch
- Mansoor Alfeeli as Pervez
- Tony Hasnath as Rasool
- Fatima Al Taei as Hani
- Omar Malik as Gul
- Nitin Mirani as Private Sajjad
- Omar Bin Haider as Private Malik
- Ibrahim Renno as Private Amjad
- Yousuf Murad Baloch as doctor

== Production ==
The Line of Freedom was developed by DWF productions with UNPO human rights ambassadors Noordin Mengal and Bhawal Mengal. The film was shot in September 2012 at an undisclosed location somewhere in the Middle East.

== Release ==
A short version of the feature was released online in 2013.
