= Burnley Youth Theatre =

Youth theatre in Burnley, Lancashire, England

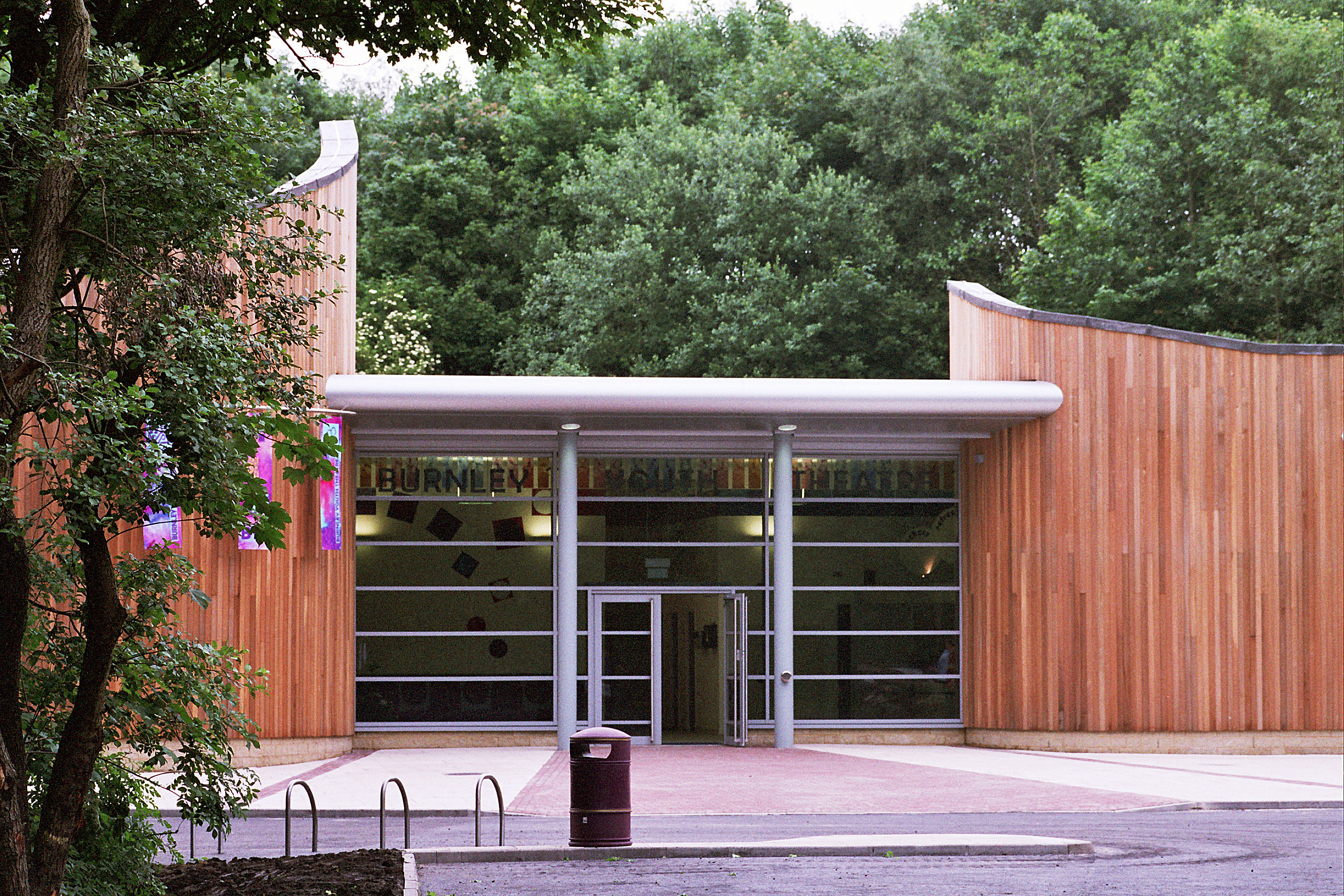
Burnley Youth Theatre (2005)

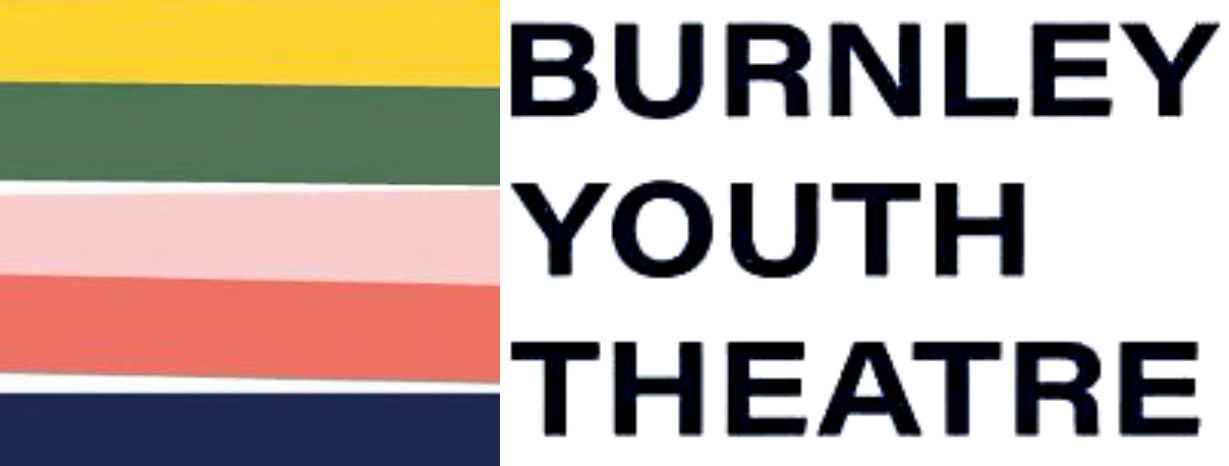
BYT Logo (2022 onwards)

Burnley Youth Theatre is a youth theatre at the heart of the community in Burnley, Lancashire. Established in 1973, it has created shows, tours and performances, including new and existing work. Working with young people from 0 to 18 (up to 25 with LDD), the theatre operates from its purpose-built theatre just next to Queens Park, Burnley, it was the first purpose-built youth theatre in the UK, and opened its doors in 2005.

Activities include drama workshops, dance workshops, production auditions, volunteering for front of house or technical duties, and working towards a qualification such as the Arts Award. These sessions run weekly alongside, education projects, work in the community and a range of arts-based activities. The theatre also works with a range of young people in outreach activities and partake in community cohesion work in Burnley.

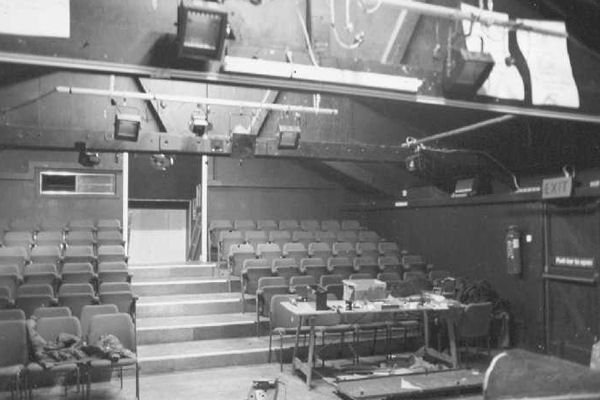
Inside the Quarry Theatre circa 1990

== History ==
Burnley Youth Theatre evolved out of the Burnley Inter-Schools Drama Group (established in September 1972). Almost immediately the group's name was shortened to Burnley Youth Theatre and ran as such throughout 1973. Burnley Youth Theatre formally established its own constitution in April 1974. In its early years the Youth Theatre was run from various locations in Burnley, including the Deaf Institute on Hebrew Road. Most performances took place in the Towneley High School, now Unity Unity College, drama studio, with the last Burnley Youth theatre performance held there in June 1986. In the late 1970s, when Burnley Council implemented its Slum Clearance Plan to regenerate deprived Burnley wards, BYT's rehearsal room was part of the programme. As recompense, Burnley Council gave BYT a long term lease on some land opposite Queens Park. In 1978 the organisation moved onto its current site on Queens Park Road and worked from two wooden huts / sheds. The site had previously been home to the experimental theatre group Welfare State International. In 1983 as part of the government's Youth Opportunities Programme, one shed was converted into a theatre which opened in September 1983 with the musical Camelot. The shed was named the Quarry Theatre, due to the theatre sitting on the edge of the disused Bank Hall Colliery quarry site. The theatre remains on the same site today.

BYT (as Burnley Youth Theatre is affectionally known) depended on volunteers to ensure the successful running of the organisation through much of the 1970s and early 1980s. However as the youth theatre grew and developed it was decided in 1986, to employ its first part-time Artistic Director, Anthony Preston. On average, the theatre developed and delivered 6 to 10 shows annually at that time. In 1987 BYT were invited to form part of a welcome celebration for H.M. Queen Elizabeth II when she officially opened the Burnley Mechanics Theatre on 12 November 1987. The Mechanics hosted the BYT's large scale Christmas shows from 1994 until 2004.

In September 1992 Thinking of England written by Nick Maynard and directed by Nick Maynard and Anthony Preston was selected to be part of the 1993 Lloyds Bank Theatre Challenge and would go on to be presented at the National Theatre on London's South Bank in 1993. Originally performed in June 1992 at the Quarry Theatre, it was taken to the National Youth Arts Festival at Ilfracombe later in the same month. Prior to the National Theatre performance in 1993 Thinking of England had a February re-write to meet the strict time constraints of the London performance.

The organisation took on its first full-time worker in 1997. As artistic director, Jacky Riddell worked towards the development of a range of activities, and the development of Burnley Youth Theatre as a charity and a company limited by guarantee. This meant that the organisation could begin to explore other means of generating funds. In 1999 it was given RFO status, and began receiving public funds.

In 2001 Lisa O'Neill became the first youth arts worker, and began working more extensively in the community, ensuring that young people who would not normally attend the youth theatre were able to benefit from the work that went on there. Throughout this period, a colossal effort was made to raise funds to develop a new building. In 2004, these efforts began to take shape. The organisation was awarded lottery funding and money from NWDA and the building began in earnest, with the new theatre opening its doors in June 2005, with playwright David Edgar being in attendance. Volunteer Alan Daiches who had previously worked at Burnley Leisure was instrumental, along with Moira Preston and Board of Directors Chair Andrew Walker, in building a permanent home for Burnley Youth Theatre. In recognition of his service the theatre studio was named the Alan Daiches Studio in his honour.

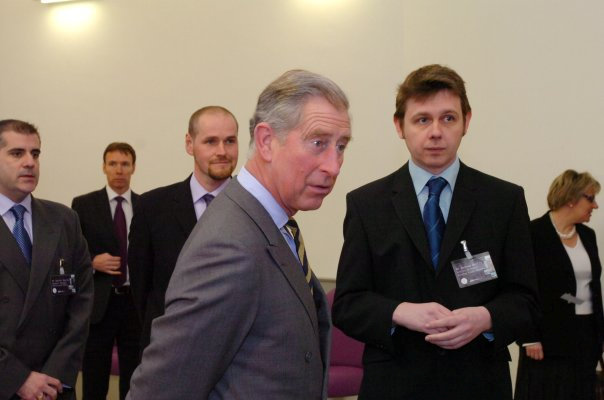
HRH Prince Charles Visits BYT in 2008

When The Prince's Trust wished to host an awards ceremony in Burnley, the Burnley Youth Theatre was chosen. Artistic Director Andrew Raffle welcomed the then Prince Charles, HRH The Prince of Wales, on 21 February 2008 and gave him a tour of the building, along with chair of the Board Colin Hardacre.

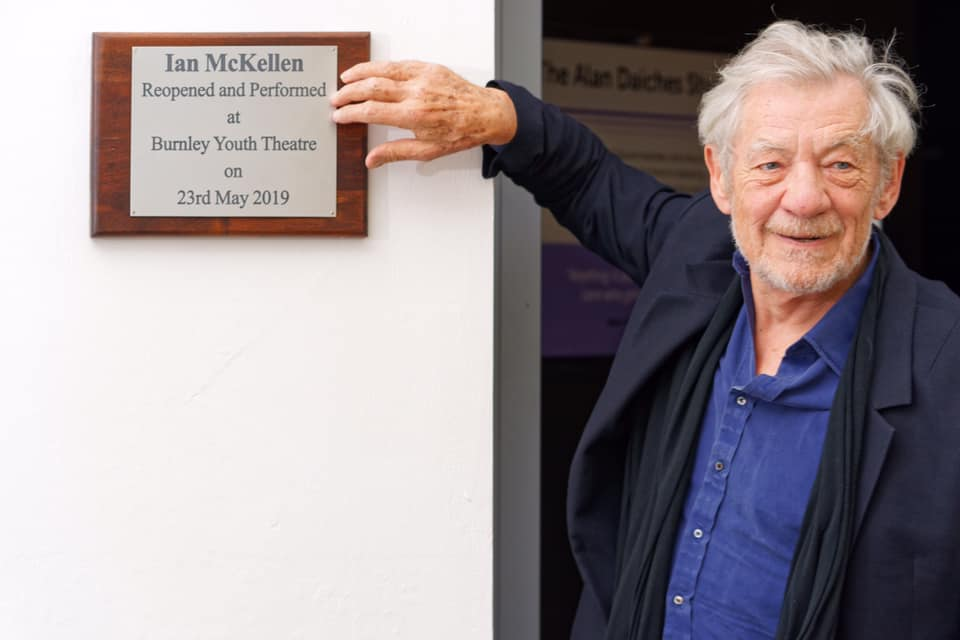
Sir Ian McKellen re-opens BYT in 2019

Playwright Julia Donaldson came to watch a performance of her book Bombs and Blackberries which was directed by Artistic Director Mandy Precious in March 2010.

When a flood and leaking roof caused the Burnley Youth Theatre to close from April 2018, BYT was warmly welcomed back to the new Drama Studio (Auditorium) of Unity College (formerly Towneley High School) as it presented the play Goodnight Mister Tom. This was the first time BYT had performed in the school (albeit on a different site) since 1986. After repairs Burnley Youth Theatre was officially re-opened by Sir Ian McKellen on 23 May 2019, when he unveiled a plaque and presented his one-man touring show, celebrating his life and his 80th Birthday.

In 2023 Burnley Youth Theatre celebrated its 50th Anniversary with a series of themed workshops, community events, productions, a bespoke woodland trail (featuring twine woven characters from past BYT productions) and a permanent exhibition celebrating BYT's heritage. The festivities culminated in September with a Gala 50th Anniversary Ball, where alumni, friends, current participants and staff gathered for a celebratory meal, with entertainment from current and former participants. The event was hosted by longstanding BYT alumni Anthony Preston and Philip J. Hindle (aka Pip).

== Moira Preston Building ==
In 2013 the old wooden Burnley Youth Theatre building (the Quarry Theatre) had come to the end of its life and was demolished. Permission was given to build a second permanent building on site. This additional rehearsal space would be built on the footprint of the old Quarry Theatre. The building officially opened on 29 March 2014 as the Moira Preston Building, in honour of Moira Preston who volunteered almost forty years of her life to the organisation in roles ranging from Wardrobe Mistress, Management Committee Chair to BYT's Finance Director.

== Artistic Directors ==
Gordon Simms - Artistic Director [1972 – 1974] Mick Dawson - Artistic Director [1974 – 1986] Anthony Preston - Artistic Director [1986 – 1997] Gillian Longdon – Co. Artistic Director [1986 – 1987] Heather Barclay - Associate Artistic Director [1987 – 1991] Nick Maynard Associate Artistic Director [1991 – 1997] Jacky Riddell - Artistic Director [1997 – 2005] Lisa O’Neill - Associate Artistic Director [2005 – 2006] Andrew Raffle - Artistic Director [2005 – 2009] Mandy Precious - Artistic Director [2009 – 2014] Karen Metcalfe (née Barnes) - Artistic Director [2014 – (maternity leave 2019 – 2020 & 2021 - 2022) present] Louise Harney – Interim Artistic Director [2019] Anthony Preston – Interim Artistic Director [2019 – 2020] Lindsey West - Interim Chief Executive [2021 - 2022] Vicky Holliday – Interim Artistic Director [2024 – 2025] David Allen – Artistic Director [2025 – present]

== Alumni include ==
Paul Abbott (Writer / Producer - Work includes: [on television] Shameless, Coronation Street, Cracker), David Bardsley (Actor - Work includes: [on stage] Blood Brothers, Billy Elliot, [on television] Gentleman Jack), Anna Jane Casey (Actor - Work includes: [on stage] Grease, Chicago, Cabaret, Spamalot, Mother Goose with Sir Ian McKellen, Kiss of the Spider Woman), Julia Howarth (Actor - Work includes: [on television] Coronation Street, Doctors, Call the Midwife), Martin O'Brien (Performance Artist), Jody Latham (Actor - Work includes: [on television] Shameless, Coronation Street, EastEnders), Thomas Pickles (Work includes: [on television] Broken Water, Doctors, Father Brown, Young Hyacinth [on stage] Dead Party Animals, The Comedy of Errors, The Merry Wives of Windsor, Peter Pan), Joy Wilkinson (Writer - Work includes: [on television] Doctor Who, Nick Nickleby, Doctors [on stage] Britain's Best Recruiting Sergeant, Fair and The Sweet Science of Bruising, [on radio] adaptations of a number of Agatha Christie books).
