= Granada Nights =

- Directed by: Abid Khan
- Written by: Abid Khan
- Produced by: Abid Khan
- Starring: Antonio Aakeel; Quintessa Swindell; Óscar Casas; Julius Fleischanderl; Laura Frederico; Isabel Guardiola; Leticia Marín; Virgile Bramly; Ezra Faroque Khan; Alice Sanders; Giovanni Battaglia
- Cinematography: Ossi Jalkanen
- Edited by: Fiona Brands
- Music by: Andrea Boccadoro
- Release date: 28 May 2021
- Country: United Kingdom
- Language: English

Granada Nights is a 2021 coming-of-age film directed by Abid Khan starring Antonio Aakeel, Quintessa Swindell, Tábata Cerezo and Óscar Casas.

== Plot ==
A British tourist is stuck in Granada, Spain with a broken heart. Feeling lost and abandoned, he befriends a group of young foreigners and crashes into the heart of the international student scene. He pushes himself out of his comfort-zone and tries to restart his life but behind every corner is a reminder of his ex-girlfriend and his struggle to find closure. A love letter to Granada that mixes documentary with fiction to create a real and authentic heartfelt examination on the process of self-discovery.

== Cast ==
- Antonio Aakeel as Ben
- Quintessa Swindell as Amelia
- Óscar Casas as Lucas
- Tábata Cerezo as Ella
- Virgile Bramly as Big Dave
- Ezra Faroque Khan as Bilal
- Julius Fleischanderl as Oscar
- Laura Frederico as Silvia
- Isabel Guardiola as Katrin
- Leticia Marín as Tatianna
- Alice Sanders
- Léo Bourgouin as Victor
- Laura Dafne as Paca
- Giovanni Battaglia as Giovanni
- Cristóbal Blanco García (voice)
- Isabelle Scott as Julia
