= Jack Carroll (comedian) =

English comedian and actor (born 1998)

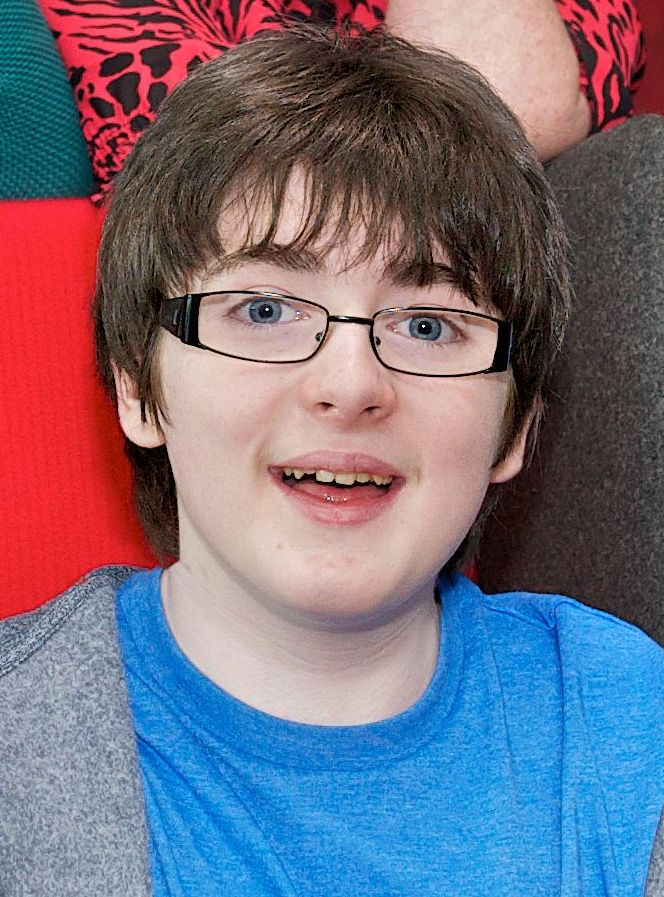
- Carroll in 2013
- Born: 18 October 1998 (age 27); Bradford, England
- Education: Brighouse High School
- Notable work: Ministry of Curious Stuff (2012–2014); Britain's Got Talent (2013); Big School (2014); Trollied (2014–2018); Live at the Apollo (2016); Coronation Street (2023–2025)

Comedy career
- Years active: 2011–present
- Occupations: Comedian; actor
- Agent: Independent Talent Group

Jack Carroll (born 18 October 1998) is an English comedian and actor. He competed in the seventh series of Britain's Got Talent at the age of 14, finishing as the runner-up. As an actor, he appeared in two series of the CBBC series Ministry of Curious Stuff and from 2014 to 2018, he starred in the Sky sitcom Trollied. Carroll, whose cerebral palsy is often a subject of his act, won a Pride of Britain award in 2012. He returned to mainstream media in 2024, taking on a regular role in Coronation Street.

It was announced that he had left his role in Coronation Street and filmed his final scenes in March 2025.

== Comedy career ==
Carroll was born and raised in Bradford, West Yorkshire. In 2010, at the age of 12, Carroll came to comedian Jason Manford's attention when he saw a video of Carroll performing at his parents' wedding anniversary. At Manford's invitation, Carroll gave a short performance at the start of Manford's live show in front of more than 1,400 people at St. George's Hall in Bradford. The performance was featured on a segment of BBC One's The One Show. He performed with Manford again on 21 and 22 June 2013 at the Victoria Theatre in Halifax.

== Acting career ==
In early 2012, Carroll was cast as Mr. Frazernagle in Ministry of Curious Stuff on the CBBC channel, which starred Vic Reeves, and has appeared in two series of the show.

On 4 May 2014, it was announced that Carroll would appear in an episode of the BBC One sitcom Big School playing Dean, a new student at Greybridge School. He appeared in the fifth episode of the second series (broadcast 3 October 2014).

On 6 June 2014, Carroll was cast in the fourth series of Sky1 comedy show Trollied, in the role of Harry.

Carroll made a guest appearance in the BBC One daytime soap Doctors on 10 March 2015. He also made his acting debut on the 4 O'Clock Club as a pupil thinking of joining Elmsmere.

He plays the role of Pete in the 2019 film Eaten by Lions.

In August 2019, Carroll appeared in Episode 1 of series 7 of Father Brown, where he portrayed Tim Cudlip, the younger brother of two would-be train robbers.

In 2020, it was announced Carroll had been cast to make his theatrical debut in Cured, a play about a religious pilgrimage. The play is expected to open in Liverpool's Royal Court theatre in 2022 before touring the UK.

It was announced in October 2023 that Carroll would be joining the cast of Coronation Street. He would be introduced as Bobby Crawford, the nephew of series veteran Carla Barlow, and son to Rob Donovan. He would live with Carla from early 2024 onwards, also working at her company. For his role as Bobby, Caroll was longlisted for "Best newcomer" at the 2024 Inside Soap Awards.

In 2023, Carroll co-wrote the comedy short film Mobility, which won the British Academy Television Award for Best Short Form at the 2024 British Academy Television Awards.

== Britain's Got Talent ==
Carroll was a contestant on the seventh series of Britain's Got Talent in 2013. At his first audition, screened on 13 April, the judges unanimously voted him through to the next round. He was later put through to the live semi-finals. Carroll appeared on the second live semi-final on 28 May, winning the show with 42.5 per cent of the public vote.

He performed once again at the final on 8 June. At the end of the competition, Carroll finished in second place after receiving 20.1 per cent of the vote, behind Hungarian shadow theatre group Attraction with 27 per cent.

== Other work ==
Following the Britain's Got Talent final, Carroll signed a deal with Simon Cowell's company Syco to write an autobiography.

Carroll has appeared on the CBBC shows The Dog Ate My Homework and Sam & Mark's Big Friday Wind-Up. In 2015, he made guest appearances in Tonight at the Palladium and Jason Manford's It's a Funny Old Week. In 2016, Carroll performed on the BBC Two series Live at the Apollo. In 2017, Carroll appeared on the BBC Radio 4 topical comedy show, The Now Show.

In September 2016, Carroll performed at the Keep Corbyn rally in Brighton in support of Jeremy Corbyn's campaign in the Labour Party leadership election.

In 2025, Jack was a mystery guest on the Inside no. 9/Stage Fright tour.

== Personal life ==
Carroll was born 11 weeks prematurely and he has cerebral palsy. In 2012, he won a Pride of Britain Award in the "Teenager of Courage" category.

Carroll lives in West Yorkshire, He is a Leeds United F.C fan and on 31 August 2013, he performed at Elland Road at the launch of the club's Families United initiative.

== Filmography ==
Title	Year	Role	Notes	Source
Ministry of Curious Stuff	2012–2013	Mr. Frazernagle	26 episodes	
Pride of Britain Awards	2012	Himself	Winner	
Britain's Got Talent	2013	Himself	Contestant; runner-up	
The Dog Ate My Homework	2014–2015	Panelist	2 episodes	
4 O'Clock Club	2014	Student	1 episode	
Big School	2014	Dean	2 episodes	
Trollied	2014–2018	Harry	Series regular, 25 episodes	
Doctors	2015	Peter Harker	1 episode	
Sunday Night at the Palladium	2015	Himself	Performer	
It's a Funny Old Week	2015	Himself	Performer	
Live at the Apollo	2016	Himself	Performer	
Eaten by Lions	2018	Pete		
Father Brown	2019	Tim Cudlip	1 episode	
QI	2021	Himself	1 episode	
Doctors	2021	Duncan Wheatley	1 episode	
Ladhood	2021	Huddsy	1 episode	
Mobility	2023	Mike	BAFTA winner 2024	
Coronation Street	2023-2025	Bobby Crawford	Regular role	
Would I Lie to You?	2024	Himself	1 episode	
