= Dany Garcia =

American film producer

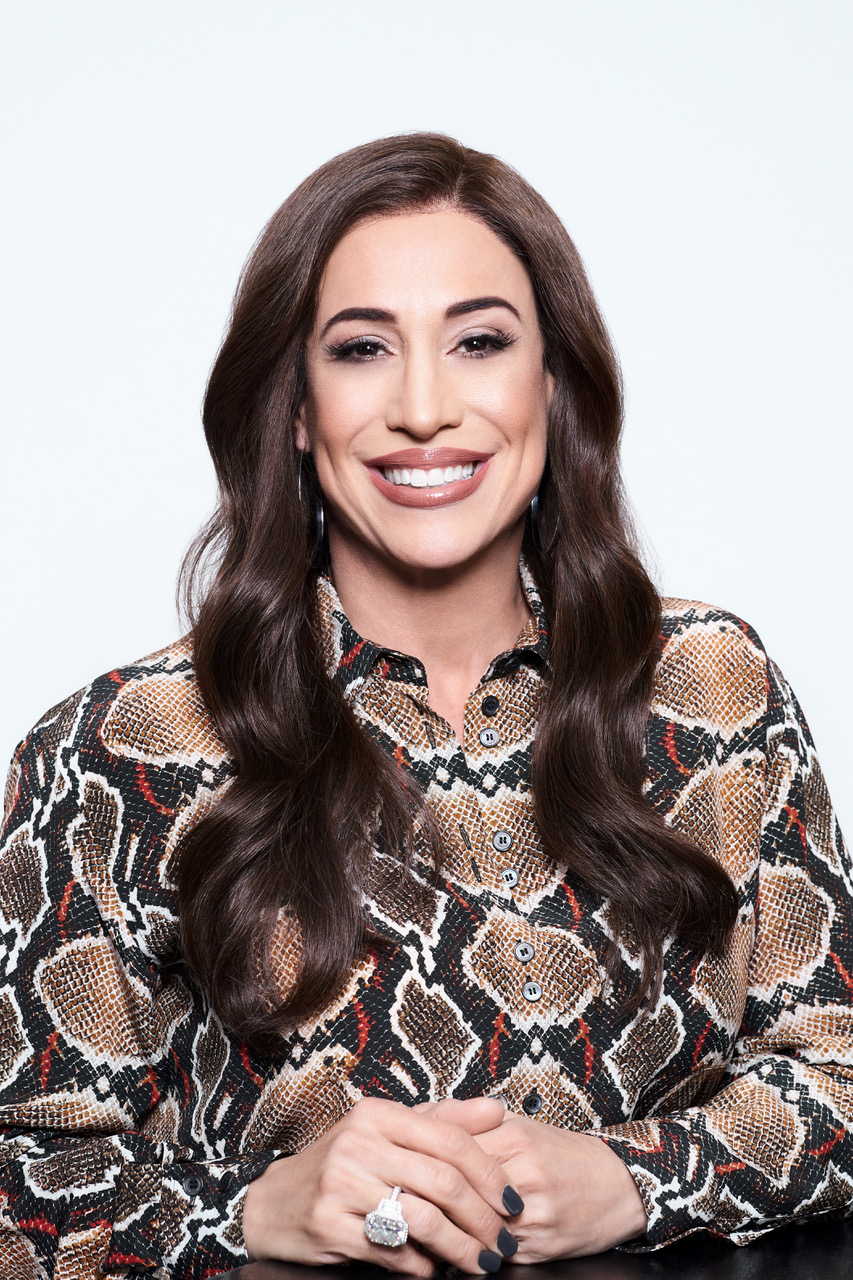
- Garcia in 2020
- Born: November 29, 1968 (age 57); Belleville, New Jersey, U.S.
- Education: University of Miami (BBA)
- Occupations: Chairwoman; CEO; investor; producer
- Years active: 2008–present
- Organizations: The Garcia Companies; Seven Bucks Productions
- Title: Chairwoman
- Spouses: Dwayne Johnson (m. 1997; div. 2008); Dave Rienzi (m. 2014)
- Children: Simone Johnson
- Family: Anoaʻi (by marriage, divorced)

Dany Garcia Rienzi (born November 29, 1968) is an American film producer and businesswoman. She is the founder of GSTQ and the CEO and chair of The Garcia Companies overseeing a portfolio of brands in business, entertainment, and food, including Teremana Tequila, Athleticon, and the Project Rock Collection at Under Armour, VOSS, Atom Tickets, Salt & Straw, ZOA Energy, Acorns, and the UFL.

Following her graduation from the University of Miami's School of Business, she began her career in finance at Merrill Lynch in 1992. In 2008, she began managing her ex-husband Dwayne Johnson's career. In 2012, Garcia co-founded the production company Seven Bucks Productions, for which she has since produced several films starring Johnson, including Baywatch, Jumanji: Welcome to the Jungle (both 2017), Shazam!, Hobbs & Shaw, Jumanji: The Next Level (all 2019), Jungle Cruise, Red Notice (both 2021), DC League of Super-Pets, and Black Adam (both 2022).

== Early life and education ==
Garcia was born to Cuban immigrants and grew up in New Jersey. She has one brother, Hiram, and one sister.

Garcia majored in international marketing and finance at the University of Miami and graduated with a Bachelor of Business Administration degree from the university's School of Business in 1992. She became an associate vice president at Merrill Lynch and started her own wealth management firm, JDM Partners LLC in 2002. In 2008, Garcia transitioned from her career in finance to manage Dwayne Johnson's career, and is now his global strategic advisor.

== Career ==
In 2008, Garcia executive produced the documentary Theater of War, directed by John Walter and starring Meryl Streep and Kevin Kline. This was followed by the Christmas-themed romantic drama film Lovely, Still (2008), starring Martin Landau and Ellen Burstyn. The following year, Garcia produced the documentary Racing Dreams (2009). Directed by Marshall Curry, the film follows two boys and a girl as they compete and aspire to become professional NASCAR drivers. The film was critically acclaimed, winning Best Documentary at the 2009 Tribeca Film Festival, where it was also runner up for the Audience Award. The film received a 100% fresh rating from Rotten Tomatoes based on 26 reviews, with a weighted average of 7.38/10. The film was called "The best film of the year" by the Los Angeles Times ("The Envelope") and "Absorbing… one of the rare documentaries you leave wishing it was a little longer, " by The New York Times.

In 2012, Garcia and Johnson co-founded their production company, Seven Bucks Productions. Garcia then produced the action film Snitch (2013), directed by Ric Roman Waugh and starring Johnson, followed by the reality television series The Hero. She later founded her multi-platform enterprise, The Garcia Companies and TGC Management, a global brand development and management company, representing actors Henry Cavill and Dwayne Johnson. That same year, TNT ordered eight hour-long episodes for the reality television series Wake Up Call, which premiered in 2014 and into 2015. Garcia was executive producer for all eight episodes, which was described as The Hero's "natural successor." Another reality TV series, Clash of the Corps, premiered in 2016 with Fuse TV. Garcia and Johnson later launched a digital channel for the short-TV series Millennials the Musical (2016).

In 2017, Garcia executive produced several projects for TV and the web, all starring Johnson . The first one was Rock and a Hard Place for HBO, which focuses on the lives of incarcerated young people. This was followed by the web series Logan Paul Summer Saga with American internet personality Logan Paul, Bro/Science/Life: The Series, and Lifeline.

Garcia later executive produced her first large budget film, Baywatch (2017), an action comedy film directed by Seth Gordon and based on the television series of the same name. The film was panned critically, but a box office success, grossing $177.8 million worldwide, against a production budget of $69 million. Garcia followed this up with Jumanji: Welcome to the Jungle (2017), a fantasy adventure comedy film directed by Jake Kasdan. It the third installment of the Jumanji franchise, after Zathura: A Space Adventure (2005) and a direct sequel to Jumanji (1995), which was based on the 1981 children's book of the same name by Chris Van Allsburg. Jumanji: Welcome to the Jungle received positive reviews and grossed $962.1 million worldwide, becoming one of Sony's highest-grossing films of all time.

Rampage (2018), a science fiction monster film directed by Brad Peyton, and based on the video game series of the same name by Midway Games, was released the following year. It grossed over $428 million worldwide and received mixed reviews from critics. Garcia's next film, Skyscraper (2018), an action film written and directed by Rawson Marshall Thurber, received similar critical responses. Garcia then executive produced the documentary Stuntman (2018). She returned to television as executive producer on HBO's most-watched half-hour comedy-drama series Ballers for HBO.

In 2019, Garcia executive produced The Titan Games, a sports competition series which premiered on NBC and has been renewed for a second season. The same year, Seven Bucks’ made its Sundance Film Festival debut with the biographical sports comedy-drama film, Fighting with My Family, written and directed by Stephen Merchant and produced by Garcia, followed the same year. Garcia later produced a six-episode docu-series Finding Justice for BET, focusing on the stories of heroes, leaders, advocates and change agents in the African American community across America as they uncover injustices and fight to bring healing and change.

Returning to the large screen, Garcia was executive producer for the superhero film based on the DC Comics character of the same name, Shazam! (2019), The Fast and the Furious spin-off Hobbs & Shaw (2019), and produced Jumanji: The Next Level (2019) which set the record Seven Bucks Productions’ biggest global opening weekend.

In August 2020, Garcia and Johnson led the consortium that purchased the XFL out of bankruptcy from its founder, Vince McMahon, the first woman to own an equal or majority ownership stake in a major professional sports league in the United States. Garcia has followed the iterations of the XFL as both a fan and businesswoman since its original 2001 incarnation. As Chairwoman, Garcia led the XFL’s ownership group alongside Dwayne Johnson and Gerry Cardinale's RedBird Capital Partners, which launched on February 18, 2023. At the end of 2023, the XFL was merged with the Fox Corporation owned USFL to form the United Football League with Garcia retaining partial ownership.

After not releasing any new projects in 2020, Garcia partnered up with Disney for the Disney+ docuseries Behind the Attraction (2021), Disney+ documentary Stuntman (2021), and the blockbuster film Jungle Cruise (2021), based on the classic 1955 Disneyland ride. She also produced Young Rock, an American television sitcom based upon long-time collaborator Johnson's life.

That same year, Garcia announced the launch of her latest venture, GSTQ. A lifestyle and fashion brand, GSTQ includes a curated, ready-to-wear fashion collection.

== Awards ==
- In 2016 and 2018, Garcia was named to Variety magazine's "Power of Women Report".
- In 2018, 2019, 2020, 2021 and 2022, she was named to Variety magazine's 500 list.
- In 2020, Garcia was awarded the Outstanding Film Producer Impact Award from the National Hispanic Media Coalition and named to The Hollywood Reporter 's 2021 Women in Entertainment Power 100 list.
- In 2021, she was named to Create & Cultivate's 100.
- In 2021, she was named to Adweek's Most Powerful Women in Sports 2020 list.
- In 2022, she was named to Entrepreneur magazine's Women of Influence list, Inc. magazine's "Female Founders 100" lis, and Success magazine’s Top 25 Most Influential Leaders of 2022.

== Personal life ==
=== Relationships ===
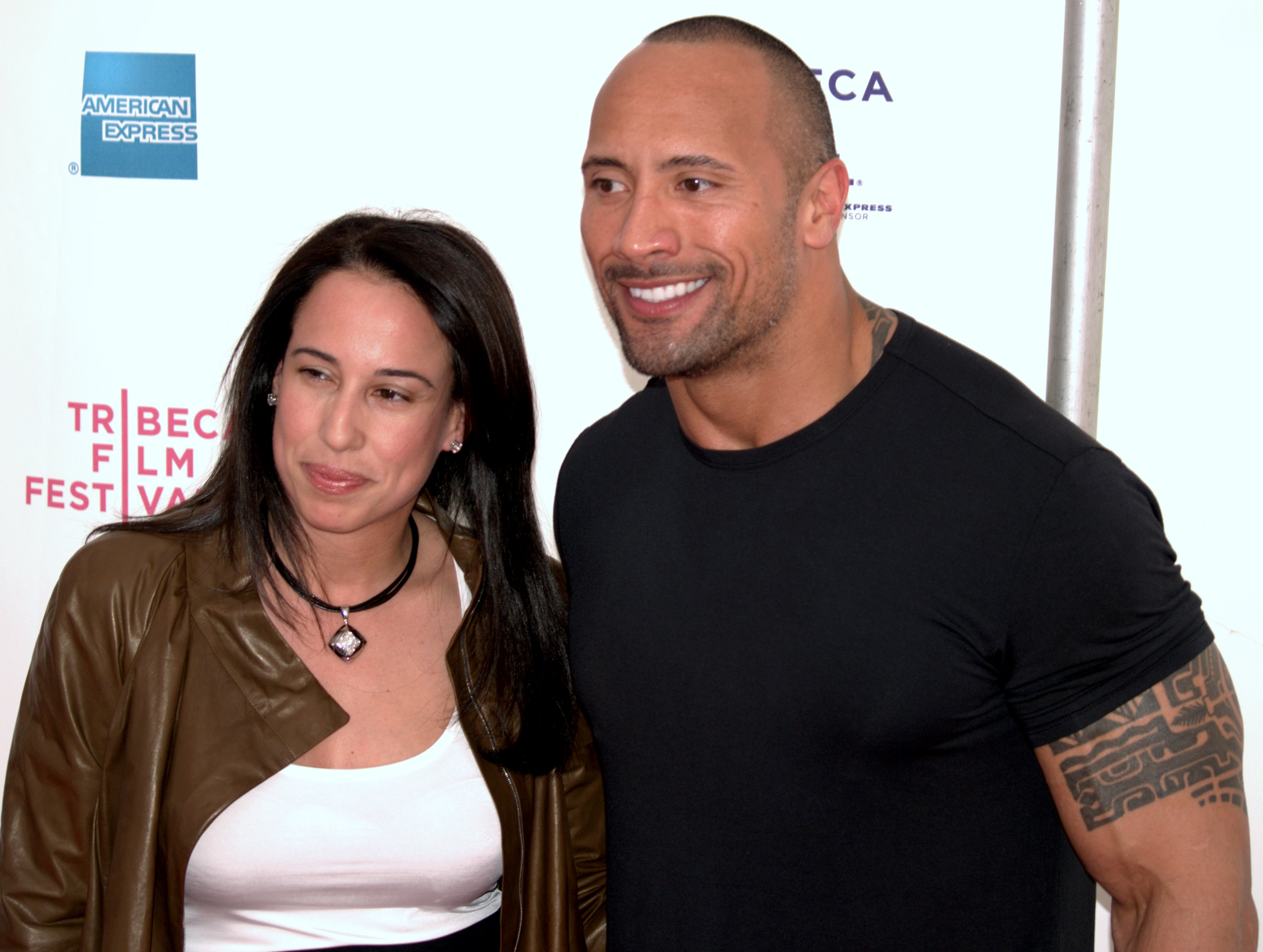
Garcia with ex-husband Dwayne Johnson in April 2009

Garcia met Dwayne Johnson while both were University of Miami college students, and they were married on May 3, 1997. They have one child together, professional wrestler Simone Johnson. On June 1, 2007, the couple announced they were divorcing amicably. The divorce was finalized in May 2008, and Garcia is now Johnson's global strategic advisor. In 2014, Garcia married bodybuilder and The Garcia Companies' Chief Health and Fitness Brand Officer Dave Rienzi. They reside in Los Angeles and Orlando and have four dogs.

=== Interests and hobbies ===
Garcia is a bodybuilder and often credits the sport for shaping her relentless nature in business. She first competed in 2011 and went on to earn her International Fitness and Bodybuilding Federation pro card in 2014. She was the first-ever Women's Physique Division athlete to be signed to the Weider roster.

Garcia holds several board positions. In 2008, she founded the Beacon Experience as part of the nationwide I Have a Dream Foundation that encourages at-risk students to continue their education beyond high school. The same year, she was elected to the board of directors for Pediatrix Medical Group, Inc.'s. Garcia is a trustee at the University of Miami and is the current president of the University of Miami Alumni Association.

== Filmography ==
=== Producer ===
- Fighting with My Family (2019)
- Jumanji: The Next Level (2019)
- Jungle Cruise (2021)
- Red Notice (2021)
- DC League of Super-Pets (2022)
- Black Adam (2022)
- Moana (2026) : co-producer
- Jumanji: Open World (2026)

=== Executive producer ===
Featured films

- Lovely, Still (2008)
- Snitch (2013)
- Baywatch (2017)
- Jumanji: Welcome to the Jungle (2017)
- Rampage (2018)
- Skyscraper (2018)
- Shazam! (2019)
- Hobbs & Shaw (2019)
- Red One (2024)

Documentary films

- Theater of War (2008)
- Racing Dreams (2009)
- Stuntman (2018)

Television

Year	Title	Notes
2011	P.O.V.	
2013	The Hero	
2014–2015	Wake Up Call	
2016	Clash of the Corps	
2016	Millennials the Musical	
2016–2018	Seven Bucks Digital Studios	TV series shorts
2017	Rock and a Hard Place	
2017	Soundtracks: Songs That Defined History	
2017	Logan Paul Summer Saga	Web series
2017	Bro/Science/Life: The Series	Web series
2017	Lifeline	Web series
2017	Reality Quest	Video short
2018	Ballers	
2019	The Titan Games	
2019	Finding Justice	
2019	K Great Thanks	
2021–2023	Young Rock	
2021–2026	Behind the Attraction	
