= Seven Bucks Productions =

American film studio

- Industry: Film; Television; Digital networks; Emerging technologies
- Founded: 2012; 14 years ago
- Founders: Dwayne Johnson; Dany Garcia
- Key people: Dwayne Johnson; Dany Garcia
- Subsidiaries: Seven Bucks Digital Studios; Seven Bucks Creative
- Website: sevenbucks.com

Seven Bucks Productions is an American production company specializing in film, television, and other media. Originally founded by actor Dwayne Johnson and his manager/ex-wife Dany Garcia in 2012, the company is involved in film, television, digital networks, and emerging technologies. It produces a variety of projects, usually directly in relation with Johnson's acting roles, and has grossed $4.6 billion at the box office as of 2023. Its subsidiaries include Seven Bucks Digital Studios and Seven Bucks Creative.

== History ==
Seven Bucks Productions was founded in 2012 by actor Dwayne Johnson and Dany Garcia, Johnson's ex-wife and later manager. Its name is a reference to the amount of money Johnson had in his pocket after he was released from the CFL in 1995, before he signed with WWE in 1996 and became one of the most popular professional wrestlers of all time.

Johnson remains the CEO and owner alongside Garcia. In 2017, Garcia's brother Hiram was promoted to the company's president of production, overseeing each of its projects. Other figures include Chelsea Friedland as vice president of production since 2017, Kevin Hill as head of television and digital development since 2018, Maya Lasry as chief marketing officer since 2019, Kimberly Bialek as executive vice president of development and production since 2020, Scott Landsman as head of television since 2023, and Melissa Fried as vice president of film development and production since 2023.

In June 2024, Seven Bucks signed a first-look deal with The Walt Disney Company to develop and produce films for theatrical and streaming. In February 2025, the company signed an additional first-look deal with 20th Television.

== Filmography ==
=== Film ===
| Title | U.S. release date | Director(s) | Co-production companies | Distributing company |
Released
| Rock and a Hard Place | March 27, 2017 | Jon Alpert & Matthew O'Neill | 44 Blue Productions, Home Box Office Originals, HBO Documentary Films, Home Box Office Inc. | Home Box Office |
| Baywatch | May 25, 2017 | Seth Gordon | Paramount Pictures, Uncharted, Shanghai Film Group, Huahua Media, The Montecito Picture Company, Flynn Company, Fremantle Productions | Paramount Pictures |
| Jumanji: Welcome to the Jungle | December 20, 2017 | Jake Kasdan | Columbia Pictures, Matt Tolmach Productions, Radar Pictures | Sony Pictures Releasing |
| Rampage | April 13, 2018 | Brad Peyton | New Line Cinema, FlynnPictureCo., Wrigley Pictures, ASAP Entertainment | Warner Bros. Pictures |
| Skyscraper | July 13, 2018 | Rawson Marshall Thurber | Legendary Pictures, FlynnPictureCo. | Universal Pictures |
| Stuntman | September 20, 2018 | Kurt Mattila | Driven Pictures | Endeavor Content (Note: The film later received a wide-audience release as a Disney+ original film on July 23, 2021.) |
| Fighting with My Family | February 14, 2019 | Stephen Merchant | Metro-Goldwyn-Mayer, Film4 Productions, The Ink Factory, WWE Studios Inc., Misher Films | Mirror Releasing, Universal Pictures |
| Shazam! | April 5, 2019 | David F. Sandberg | DC Films, New Line Cinema, The Safran Company | Warner Bros. Pictures |
| Fast & Furious Presents: Hobbs & Shaw | August 2, 2019 | David Leitch | Chris Morgan Productions, Original Film | Universal Pictures |
| Jumanji: The Next Level | December 13, 2019 | Jake Kasdan | Columbia Pictures, Matt Tolmach Productions, Radar Pictures | Sony Pictures Releasing |
| Jungle Cruise | July 30, 2021 | Jaume Collet-Serra | Walt Disney Pictures, Davis Entertainment, FlynnPictureCo. | Walt Disney Studios Motion Pictures |
| Red Notice | November 5, 2021 | Rawson Marshall Thurber | Flynn Picture Company, Bad Version Inc., Netflix Original Films | Netflix |
| DC League of Super-Pets | July 29, 2022 | Jared Stern | DC Entertainment, Warner Animation Group | Warner Bros. Pictures |
| Black Adam | October 21, 2022 | Jaume Collet-Serra | DC Films, New Line Cinema, FlynnPictureCo. | Warner Bros. Pictures |
| Breaking Olympia: The Phil Heath Story | March 26, 2024 | Brett Harvey | Score G Productions, Super Channel Entertainment Network, The Garcia Companies | Universal Pictures |
| Red One | November 15, 2024 | Jake Kasdan | Metro-Goldwyn-Mayer, The Detective Agency, Chris Morgan Productions | Amazon MGM Studios |
| Andy Kaufman is Me | June 6, 2025 | Clay Tweel | Campfire Studios, Worldwide Pants Incorporated, Fifth Season, Andy Kaufman Estate | Tribeca Festival |
| The Smashing Machine | October 3, 2025 | Benny Safdie | Out for the Count | A24 |
| Moana | July 10, 2026 | Thomas Kail | Walt Disney Pictures, FlynnPictureCo., 5000 Broadway Productions | Walt Disney Studios Motion Pictures |
Post-production
| Jumanji: Open World | December 25, 2026 | Jake Kasdan | Columbia Pictures, Matt Tolmach Productions, Radar Pictures | Sony Pictures Releasing |
Filming
| Lizard Music | December 25, 2027 | Benny Safdie | United Artists, Out for the Count Productions, Magnetic Fields Entertainment | Amazon MGM Studios |
| Fast Forever | March 17, 2028 | Louis Leterrier | Original Film, One Race Films, Roth/Kirschenbaum Films | Universal Pictures |
Pre-production
| Fast & Furious Presents: Hobbs & Reyes | TBA | TBA | Original Film, One Race Films, Chris Morgan Productions, FlynnPictureCo., Roth/Kirschenbaum Films | Universal Pictures |
| Free Byrd | TBA | Greg Kwedar | Artists Equity, Fifth Season, Ethos | TBA |
| Kate Warne | TBA | Jaume Collet-Serra | Amazon MGM Studios, Amazon Prime Video Original Films, Ledbury Productions, With a K Productions | Amazon Prime Video |
In development
| Untitled second Red Notice film | TBA | Rawson Marshall Thurber | Flynn Pictures Co., Bad Version Productions, Netflix Original Films | Netflix |
| Untitled third Red Notice film | TBA | Rawson Marshall Thurber | Flynn Pictures Co., Bad Version Productions, Netflix Original Films | Netflix |
| Ball and Chain | TBA | TBA | Misher Films, Ledbury Productions Limited, Netflix Original Films | Netflix |
| Teddy and the Guardians of the Night | TBA | TBA | FlynnPictureCo., Netflix Original Films | Netflix |
| John Henry and the Statesmen | TBA | Jake Kasdan | Netflix Original Films, FlynnPictureCo. | Netflix |
| Alpha Squad Seven | TBA | TBA | DreamWorks Pictures, Garcia Companies, FlynnPictureCo. | Amblin Partners |
| The King | TBA | Robert Zemeckis | New Line Cinema, ImageMovers, FlynnPictureCo. | Warner Bros. Pictures |
| San Andreas 2 | TBA | Brad Peyton | New Line Cinema, Alcon Entertainment, Flynn Picture Co. | Warner Bros. Pictures |
| Emergency Contact | TBA | TBA | FlynnPictureCo. | Warner Bros. Pictures |
| Seal Team 666 | TBA | TBA | Macmillan Films | Metro-Goldwyn-Mayer |
| Doc Savage | TBA | Shane Black | Silver Pictures, Original Film | Sony Pictures Releasing |
| Untitled Big Trouble in Little China sequel | TBA | TBA | 20th Century Studios | 20th Century Studios |
| Untitled Jungle Cruise sequel | TBA | Jaume Collet-Serra | Walt Disney Pictures, Davis Entertainment, FlynnPictureCo. | Walt Disney Studios Motion Pictures |
| The Keanon Lowe Project | TBA | TBA | Walt Disney Studios Motion Pictures | Disney+ |
| The Janson Directive | TBA | TBA | Captive Entertainment, Mythology Entertainment, Weed Road Pictures | Universal Pictures |
| Untitled Genghis Khan film | TBA | TBA | Universal Pictures, ImageMovers, UNI Film Productions | Universal Pictures |
| The Scorpion King reboot | TBA | TBA | Universal Pictures | Universal Pictures |
| It Takes Two | TBA | TBA | Hazelight Studios, Story Kitchen, Amazon MGM Studios, Amazon Prime Video Original Films | Amazon Prime Video |
| Son of Shaolin | TBA | Rick Famuyiwa | Sony Pictures Entertainment | Sony Pictures Releasing |
| Four Down | TBA | Steven Cantor | TBA | TBA |
| The Ric Flair Story | TBA | TBA | Misher Films | TBA |
| Monster Jam | TBA | TBA | Walt Disney Pictures, Feld Entertainment | Walt Disney Studios Motion Pictures |
| Untitled film | TBA | J. J. Abrams | TBA | TBA |
| Untitled film | TBA | Martin Scorsese | 20th Century Studios, Ledburry Productions, Sikelia Productions, Appian Way Productions | 20th Century Studios |
| Ripped | TBA | TBA | 20th Century Studios, 12:01 Films | 20th Century Studios |
| Breakthrough | TBA | Darren Aronofsky | A24 Films, Shiny Penny Productions, Lighthouse Management & Media | A24 |
| Teddy Ruxpin | TBA | TBA | Amazon MGM Studios, Story Kitchen | Amazon MGM Studios |
| Blasphemous | TBA | Luke Piotrowski | Thunder Road Films, Badlands Productions, Red Riot Pictures | TBA |
| Country Roads | TBA | TBA | Amazon MGM Studios | Amazon MGM Studios |
| Free Byrd | TBA | Greg Kwedar | Artists Equity, Ethos Films, Fifth Season, Gil Netter Productions | TBA |
| Undeniable: Portia Woodman | TBA | Zoë McIntosh | Pango Productions | TBA |

=== Short films ===
| Title | U.S. release date | Director | Co-production companies | Distributing company |
|---|---|---|---|---|
| The Rock's Rock | April 10, 2019 | Rudy Valdez | Seven Bucks Digital Studios, ESPN Films, Rock'n Robin Productions | ESPN |
| The Evolution of the Bull | September 30, 2021 | Jon Brandon Cruz | Seven Bucks Digital Studios | |

=== Television ===
| Title | Dates aired in U.S. | Creator(s) | Co-production companies | Distributor(s) | Network |
Released
| The Hero | June 2013–August 2013 | Rick Ringbakk | Electus Studio, 5x5 Media, Seven Bucks Entertainment, TNT Original Productions | Electus International | TNT |
| Wake Up Call | December 2014–January 2015 | Dwayne "The Rock" Johnson, Dany Garcia, Craig Armstrong, Rick Ringbakk, Charles Wachter, Ben Silverman and Corie Henson | 5x5 Media, Electus Studio | TNT Original Productions | TNT |
| Ballers | June 2015–October 2019 | Stephen Levinson | Closest to the Hole Productions, Leverage Entertainment, Film 44 | Warner Bros. Television Distribution | HBO |
| Clash of the Corps | October 2015–August 2016 | Dwayne Johnson, Dany Garcia and Rahs Drachkovitch | 44 Blue Productions | Fuse Media | Fuse |
| Soundtracks: Songs That Defined History | November 2017 | Maro Chermayeff and Jeff Dupre | CNN Films, Cable News Network, Show of Force | CNN Original Series | CNN |
| Lifeline | October 2017–November 2017 | Benjamin Freiburger and Grant Wheeler | Corridor Digital, Studio71, Seven Bucks Digital Studios, YouTube Red Original Series, YouTube Originals | YouTube Originals | YouTube Red |
| The Titan Games | January 2019–August 2020 | Dwayne Johnson | A. Smith & Co. Productions, Universal Television Alternative Studio | NBCUniversal Television Distribution | NBC |
| Finding Justice | March 2019–April 2019 | David Leepson | Leepson Bounds Entertainment | Black Entertainment Television | BET |
| Millennials: The Musical | November 2019–December 2019 | Dwayne Johnson and Lin-Manuel Miranda | Seven Bucks Digital Studios, The Village Studios, Two Grumpy Bears Studios | Seven Bucks Digital Studios | YouTube |
| Young Rock | February 2021–February 2023 | Nahnatchka Khan and Dwayne Johnson | Universal Television, Fierce Baby Productions | NBCUniversal Television Distribution | NBC |
| Behind the Attraction | July 2021–June 2026 | Brian Volk-Weiss | Disney Branded Television, The Nacelle Company | Walt Disney Direct-to-Consumer & International | Disney+ |
| Shark Week: Season 34 | July 24–30, 2022 | John Hendricks | Discovery Channel Original Series | Discovery, Inc. | Discovery Channel |
| Tales from the Territories | October 2022–December 2022 | Evan Husney and Jason Eisener | Vice Studios Canada, Vice TV | Vice Distribution | Vice |
| Who Killed WCW? | June 4–26, 2024 | Evan Husney and Jason Eisener | Vice Studios Canada, Vice TV, Vice Studios, Bell Media, Crave | Vice Studios Group | Vice |
| RoboForce: The Animated Series - A NacelleVerse Story | April 12, 2025 | Tom Stern and Gavin Hignight | The Nacelle Company, Cartoon Conrad Productions Inc., Tubi Originals | Fox Corporation | Tubi |
In development
| Dive | TBA | Steven Kane | American Broadcasting Company, 20th Television | American Broadcasting Companies LLC | ABC |
| Last Resort | TBA | Paul Feig and Laura Fischer | Powderkeg Media, Break the Room, Quibi Originals, Roku Original Series | Roku | The Roku Channel |
| Muscle Beach | TBA | Jeremiah Friedman and Nick Palmer | Flynn Picture Company | TBA | USA Network |
| Tre Cnt | TBA | Mohamad El Masri | Issa Rae Productions, 3 Arts Entertainment | Warner Bros. Television Distribution | HBO |
| Untitled Hawai'i reality series | TBA | TBA | Hulu Original Series, 20th Century Television | Disney Streaming | Hulu |
| Untitled wrestling sitcom | TBA | Dwayne Johnson and Will Ferrell | Gloria Sanchez Productions, 20th Television, FOX | Fox Entertainment Group | Fox |

=== Podcast ===
| Title | Dates aired in U.S. | Creator(s) | Co-production companies | Distributor(s) | Network |
|---|---|---|---|---|---|
| "What Really Happened?" with Andrew Jenks | September 2017–October 2023 | Andrew Jenks | Apple Podcasts, Andrew Jenks Entertainment Inc., Cadence13.Podcasting | Apple Inc. | iTunes Store |

=== Stage ===
| Title | Premiere | Playwright | Co-production companies | Distributing Company |
|---|---|---|---|---|
| Fighting With My Family: The Musical | TBA | Jon Brittain | Tilted Musicals, Birmingham Hippodrome | TBA |
