= Hobbs & Shaw =

2019 film by David Leitch

Fast & Furious Presents: Hobbs & Shaw
- Theatrical release poster
- Directed by: David Leitch
- Screenplay by: Chris Morgan; Drew Pearce
- Story by: Chris Morgan
- Produced by: Dwayne Johnson; Jason Statham; Chris Morgan; Hiram Garcia
- Starring: Dwayne Johnson; Jason Statham; Idris Elba; Vanessa Kirby; Cliff Curtis; Helen Mirren
- Cinematography: Jonathan Sela
- Edited by: Christopher Rouse
- Music by: Tyler Bates
- Production companies: Universal Pictures; Chris Morgan Productions; Seven Bucks Productions
- Distributed by: Universal Pictures
- Release dates: July 13, 2019 (Dolby Theatre); August 2, 2019 (United States)
- Running time: 137 minutes
- Country: United States
- Language: English
- Budget: $200 million
- Box office: $760 million

Fast & Furious Presents: Hobbs & Shaw (or simply Hobbs & Shaw) is a 2019 American buddy action film directed by David Leitch from a script by Chris Morgan and Drew Pearce. It is a spin-off film and the ninth installment of the Fast & Furious franchise, taking place after the events of The Fate of the Furious (2017). It stars Dwayne Johnson and Jason Statham, alongside Idris Elba, Vanessa Kirby, Eiza González, Cliff Curtis, and Helen Mirren. In the film, Luke Hobbs and Deckard Shaw join Shaw's younger sister Hattie Shaw to take down Brixton Lore (Elba), a cybernetically enhanced terrorist, who is threatening the world with a deadly virus.

Franchise star and producer Vin Diesel said in 2015 that possible spin-offs were in early development, and Hobbs & Shaw was officially announced in October 2017. Leitch signed on to direct in April 2018, with Kirby and Elba joining the cast three months later. Principal photography ran from September 2018 to January 2019, with locations including London, Glasgow, and Kauaʻi. The film was subject to controversy after longterm Fast & Furious producer Neal H. Moritz filed a lawsuit against Universal Pictures for breach of oral contract and committing promissory fraud related to his role on Hobbs & Shaw, which was eventually settled in September 2020 and he received a producer credit on F9 (2021).

Hobbs & Shaw premiered at the Dolby Theatre in Hollywood on July 13, 2019, and was theatrically released in the United States on August 2, 2019. It received mixed reviews from critics, who praised its action sequences and the chemistry between Johnson and Statham, but found it underwhelming when compared to other Fast & Furious films. It was a box office success, grossing $760 million worldwide on a budget of $200 million.

== Plot ==
In London, MI6 agent Hattie Shaw retrieves a programmable supervirus 'Snowflake' from Eteon, a techno-terrorist organization. She is ambushed by Brixton Lore, an ex-MI6 agent and Eteon operative strengthened with cybernetic implants. Hattie injects herself with the only dose of Snowflake before escaping. Brixton frames her for stealing Snowflake, forcing her to go on the run.

Two years after Cipher's defeat, Luke Hobbs is an ex-DSS agent and Deckard Shaw, Hattie's older brother, is an ex-MI6 agent who was recently pardoned for his criminal activities. (Note: As depicted in The Fate of the Furious (2017)) They are informed of the missing virus and, putting aside their past as fierce rivals, (Note: As depicted in Furious 7 (2015)) work together to track it down. Deckard goes to Hattie's apartment for information, but is attacked by Eteon operatives. Luke captures Hattie and brings her to a CIA office, but they too are attacked by Eteon forces.

Hattie is kidnapped by Brixton, whom Deckard recognizes as an old colleague-turned-enemy he thought he had killed. Luke and Deckard rescue Hattie but Brixton frames all three as criminals via Eteon's control of global news media. The three locate Snowflake's creator Prof. Andreiko and learn that he purposed it to deliver vaccines. To prevent Eteon from using it to eradicate humanity, Hattie must either be cremated or have it removed with a specialized extraction device located at Eteon's facility in Chernobyl.

The three manage to discreetly travel to Moscow under fake identities and infiltrate the facility. They retrieve the device but Andreiko is killed by Brixton and the device is damaged. Luke takes Deckard and Hattie to his childhood home in Samoa to visit his estranged brother Jonah, a talented mechanic, to repair the device. Luke has a tense reunion with his family, whom he has not seen for 25 years since he gave up his criminal father to the authorities. His mother convinces the family on the island to help Luke.

The makeshift battalion prepares for Eteon's arrival, setting up traps around the island. Jonah successfully repairs the device and starts the virus extraction just as Brixton and his army arrive. Hattie deactivates Eteon's weapons for six minutes, letting the Samoans overpower them. Brixton recaptures Hattie with a helicopter, but the Samoans help Luke and Deckard bring the aircraft down. Luke and Deckard fight together to defeat Brixton, who is then deactivated remotely by Eteon's unseen director and falls to his (apparent) death. The director sends a message, implying he knows Luke personally and intending to recruit him and the Shaw siblings.

In post-credits scenes, Luke brings his daughter to meet her extended family in Samoa for the first time, while Deckard and Hattie break their mother out of prison. Luke receives a call from his partner Locke, who has discovered a more threatening virus. Meanwhile, Luke sets the police in London on Deckard in retaliation for a prank Deckard pulled earlier.

== Cast ==
- Dwayne Johnson as Luke Hobbs: A former DSS agent assigned by the CIA to work with Shaw in stopping the Snowflake virus, despite their disdain for each other.
- Jason Statham as Deckard Shaw: A mercenary formerly with British Special Forces and MI6 and Hattie's brother, who remains at odds with Hobbs, but joins forces with him to protect Hattie, the carrier of the Snowflake virus.
  - Joshua Coombes as young Deckard
- Idris Elba as Brixton Lore: A cyber-genetically enhanced terrorist and Eteon operative and ex-MI6 field agent who has a history with Deckard.
- Vanessa Kirby as Hattie Shaw: An MI6 field agent and the sister of Deckard, who is being hunted by Brixton.
  - Meesha Garbett as young Hattie
- Eiza González as Margarita / Madame M: A high-profile thief, friend and former lover of Deckard.
- Cliff Curtis as Jonah Hobbs: Luke's estranged eldest brother, a mechanic and the computer genius of the family.
- Helen Mirren as Magdalene "Queenie" Shaw: A criminal and the imprisoned mother of Deckard and Hattie.
- Joe "Roman Reigns" Anoa'i as Mateo Hobbs: Luke's brother.
- Eddie Marsan as Professor Andreiko: A two-time Nobel Prize-winning scientist who created the Snowflake virus.
- Eliana Su'a as Sam Hobbs: Luke's daughter.
- John Tui as Kal Hobbs: Luke's brother.
- Josh Mauga as Timo Hobbs: Luke's brother.

In addition, Lori Pelenise Tuisano portrays Sefina Hobbs, the mother of Luke Hobbs and matriarch of the Hobbs family. Rob Delaney appears as CIA agent Loeb while the film's director David Leitch makes a cameo appearance as an Eteon helicopter pilot. Ryan Reynolds and Kevin Hart make uncredited cameo appearances as CIA agent Victor Locke and Air Marshal Dinkley, respectively. The Eteon Director, a role Keanu Reeves was in negotiations for, does not physically appear in the film, but is also voiced by Reynolds in a dual role, under the pseudonym "Champ Nightingale".

== Production ==
=== Development ===
In October 2017, Universal Pictures announced a spin-off film in development centered around characters Luke Hobbs and Deckard Shaw, and set a release date of July 26, 2019, with Chris Morgan returning to write the script. Shane Black was considered to direct the film. In February 2018, David Leitch entered talks to direct the film. In April 2018, Leitch was confirmed as the director for the film and added David Scheunemann as a production designer.

=== Casting ===
In July 2018, Vanessa Kirby was cast in the film to play an MI6 agent and Shaw's sister, along with Idris Elba as the main villain in the film. In October 2018, Eddie Marsan joined the cast of the film, and in November 2018, Eiza González was added as well. In January 2019, Johnson revealed that his cousin and professional wrestler Roman Reigns would appear in the film as Hobbs's brother. Additionally, he announced that Cliff Curtis, Josh Mauga, and John Tui would portray other brothers of Hobbs. Helen Mirren was also confirmed to be reprising her role from The Fate of the Furious.

=== Filming ===
Principal photography began on September 10, 2018, in London, England. Dwayne Johnson joined the production two weeks later, on September 24, 2018, after he had wrapped filming Jungle Cruise. Most filming was done at Shepperton Studios and Leavesden Studios. In October, filming moved to Glasgow, Scotland, to recreate London. Filming also took place in late 2018 at Eggborough power station in North Yorkshire, and in Farnborough, Hampshire. The Hawaiian island of Kauaʻi was used as a stand-in for Samoa for the film's third act. Cinematographer Jonathan Sela shot the film with Arri Alexa SXT and Alexa Mini digital cameras and Hawk Class-X anamorphic lenses. Production officially wrapped on January 27, 2019. Scroggins Aviation Mockup & Effects was hired to supply a UH-60 Black Hawk (s/n 79-23354) in the film. Scroggins made modification to the UH-60 and worked with the art department to supply it with a digital cockpit panel.

=== Post-production ===
The visual effects were provided by DNEG, Cantina Creative, The Third Floor, RISE FX and Framestore, supervised by Mike Brazelton and Kyle McCulloch, and produced by Dan Glass. DNEG is the main vendor for this project, with a total VFX shots of around 1,000. They worked on the big action sequences in London, Chernobyl and a part of the climatic Samoan chase. The London chase sequence consists of blue screen environments and car interiors, with CGI reflections on the McLaren exterior. There are few head replacements and full CGI character doubles. For the latter, they were created and animated from reference photography of the main actors. The same method was applied for the McLaren and the Brixton bikes. Idris Elba was enhanced to give him super-human abilities. Motion graphics were used to make a sort of heads up display of data and stats called the Brixton vision, to help him in the fights. For the Chernobyl action sequence, the environments were made from Lidar scanning, texture reference of a decommissioned coal power plant used for the production shootings. Then, they extended parts of the facility and modified weather conditions. Drones were fully created and animated. Explosions were created too. Finally, they handled the Samoa chopper destruction.

Framestore handled 264 VFX shots for the project, mostly the 3rd-act chase sequence. They photographed the Nā Pali Coast on the North Side of Kauai, Hawaii before and during the main shoot. Then, they used their photography to be photo scanned and transferred into a CGI version of the coastline. They had to fit the CGI environment to the shoot location. They also created CGI cliffs, CGI foliage and some scattered rocks on flatter areas or ledges. Finally for the creation of the environments, they used many reference plate shots for the blue screens. They also photographed, photo scanned, modeled and animated all the vehicles portrayed in that sequence, including the Peterbilt, the M37, the Ratrod and the Black Hawk. The latter was cyber scanned by ClearAngle. They adapted the CGI vehicles with the environment, including the lighting, tillable textures and painting scratches. Finally, they enhanced the explosions and car crashes with some debris, fire elements and craters.

=== Music ===
In May 2019, Film Music Reporter announced that Tyler Bates would compose the film's score. The first single of the soundtrack is "Getting Started" written by Kyle Williams aka producer Willyecho (created through the series Songland for Aloe Blacc), and performed by American singer-songwriter Aloe Blacc and rapper JID. Idris Elba himself has produced a track featuring Cypress Hill's B-Real titled "Even If I Die"; the Hybrid remix of the track appears both in the film and during the end credits. The film's soundtrack also features numerous artists including Logic, Yungblud, A$ton Wyld, Ohana Bam, and The Heavy.

=== Marketing ===
The first poster was released on January 31, 2019. The first trailer was released on February 1, 2019, and a TV spot was aired during Super Bowl LIII, on February 3, 2019. A second trailer was released on April 18, 2019. The final trailer was released on June 28, 2019.

== Release ==
=== Theatrical ===
Fast & Furious Presents: Hobbs & Shaw had its premiere at the Dolby Theatre in the Hollywood district of Los Angeles, California on July 13, 2019. The film was theatrically released in the United States on August 2, 2019, after being moved from its previous date of July 26, 2019. The film began international rollout on July 31, 2019, and was released in China on August 23, 2019. The release is in 2D, Dolby Cinema, and IMAX. A RealD 3D conversion for the film was originally planned to release but was later cancelled. However, the planned conversion was done by Stereo D.

=== Lawsuit ===
In October 2018, Fast & Furious producer Neal H. Moritz filed a lawsuit against Universal for breach of oral contract and committing promissory fraud, after the distributor removed him as lead producer on Hobbs & Shaw. In May 2019, it was revealed that Universal had dropped Moritz from all future Fast & Furious installments. His lawsuit was settled in September 2020, and Moritz would later return to the series with F9.

=== Home media ===
Hobbs & Shaw was released on Digital HD on October 15, 2019, and on DVD, Blu-ray, and Ultra HD Blu-ray on November 5, 2019, by Universal Pictures Home Entertainment.

== Reception ==
=== Box office ===
Hobbs & Shaw grossed $174 million in the United States and Canada, and $586 million in other territories, for a worldwide total of $760.7 million. Deadline Hollywood calculated the net profit of the film to be $84 million, when factoring together all expenses and revenues.

In the United States and Canada, the film was projected to gross $60–65 million from 4,253 theaters in its opening weekend, while some insiders predicted it could exceed $70 million. The film made $23.7 million on its first day, including $5.8 million from Thursday night previews, the highest amount for both Johnson and Statham outside the main Fast & Furious series. It went on to debut to $60 million over the weekend, finishing first at the box office. Similar to the main Fast & Furious films, Hobbs & Shaw had a diverse audience, with audience demographics being 40% Caucasian, 27% Hispanic, 20% African American and 13% Asian. The film dropped 58% in its second weekend to $25.3 million, remaining in first, before another Universal Pictures film Good Boys replaced it in the third week.

In other territories, the film was projected to open to around $125 million from 54 countries, for a worldwide debut of $195 million. The film made $24.9 million from its first two days of international release. In its Chinese opening weekend the film made $102 million, grossing below projections but nevertheless being the second highest-grossing weekend of 2019 behind Avengers: Endgame.

=== Critical response ===
On Rotten Tomatoes, the film holds an approval rating of 67% based on 341 reviews and an average rating of 6.1/10. The website's critical consensus reads, "Hobbs & Shaw doesn't rev as high as the franchise's best installments, but gets decent mileage out of its well-matched stars and over-the-top action sequences." On Metacritic, the film has a weighted average score of 60 out of 100, based on 54 critics, indicating "mixed or average" reviews. Audiences polled by CinemaScore gave the film an average grade of "A−" on an A+ to F scale, while those at PostTrak gave it an average four out of five stars.

Writing for Variety, Peter Debruge wrote, "Fan favorites Dwayne Johnson and Jason Statham milk the friction between their characters while teaming up to save the world in this gratuitously over-the-top spinoff." Eric Kohn of IndieWire gave the film a "B−" and stated, "Strip away the meandering exposition and Hobbs & Shaw is an old-school screwball comedy that just happens to feature two major action stars." Conversely, the Chicago Sun-Times's Richard Roeper gave the film 1.5 out of 4 stars, writing, "In case of bad-movie emergency, break glass. Over the two-hour-plus running time of the painfully long, exceedingly tedious, consistently unimaginative and quite dopey Hobbs & Shaw, I counted some 13 instances in which humans and/or vehicles went crashing through panes of glass."

Katie Walsh of Pittsburgh Post-Gazette earned a 2.5 out of 4 rating and said, "While director David Leitch, a former stuntman who helmed John Wick and Atomic Blonde, cooks up some truly breathtaking action sequences and stunts, some moments lose their crisp clarity."

=== Accolades ===
Award	Category	Recipient	Result	Ref.
Golden Trailer Awards	Best Summer Blockbuster		Nominated	
Golden Trailer Awards	Best Action TV Spot		Nominated	
Golden Trailer Awards	Best Summer Blockbuster Poster		Nominated	
People's Choice Awards	Favorite Action Movie of 2019		Nominated	
People's Choice Awards	Favorite Male Movie Star of 2019	Dwayne Johnson	Nominated	
Nickelodeon Kids' Choice Awards	Favorite Movie Actor	Dwayne Johnson (also for Jumanji: The Next Level)	Won	
Saturn Awards	Best Action or Adventure Film		Nominated	

== Sequel ==
In November 2019, producer Hiram Garcia confirmed that all creatives involved have intentions in developing a sequel, with conversations regarding the project ongoing. By March 2020, Johnson confirmed that a sequel was officially in development, while the creative team was not yet decided. Garcia confirmed the project was in active development a month later, citing the box office performance of Hobbs & Shaw, and announced Morgan would return to write. Johnson expressed excitement for the sequel that same month, stating that it will introduce new characters.

In November 2021, Johnson revealed that he had developed an original idea for the sequel, which he described as "the antithesis of Fast & Furious" and that he presented the concept to Universal Pictures chairwoman Donna Langley, as well as Garcia and Morgan. He elaborated the sequel would take immediate precedence over the rest of his film-slate, and further teased its development will progress after he completes the holiday-action film Red One (2024). Later that month, Garcia confirmed that work on the screenplay is ongoing, calling the film "very ambitious". In December 2022, Universal Pictures producer Kelly McCormick stated the film's production has been stalled.

In June 2023, Johnson announced plans for a direct sequel were postponed, and that a standalone sequel serving as a direct continuation to Fast X (2023) that would bridge into the eleventh main film was in development. The title was announced as Hobbs & Reyes, with Johnson and Jason Momoa set to star. Morgan is set to return to write the film, with Garcia, Johnson, Dany Garcia, Vin Diesel, Samantha Vincent, Jeff Kirschenbaum, and Neal H. Moritz set to produce.

== Works cited ==
- Mendelson, Scott (June 28, 2019). "Universal Hopes 'Hobbs & Shaw' Is The Exception In A Summer Ruled By Disney". Forbes.
