= List of killings by law enforcement officers in the United States, November 2023 =

This is a list of people reported killed by non-military law enforcement officers in the United States in November 2023, whether in the line of duty or not, and regardless of reason or method. The listing documents the occurrence of a death, making no implications regarding wrongdoing or justification on the part of the person killed or officer involved. Killings are arranged by date of the incident that caused death. Different death dates, if known, are noted in the description. The table below lists 110 people.

== November 2023 ==
Date	Name (age) of deceased	Race	Location	Description
2023-11-30	Lamont Bland (60)	Black	Indianapolis, Indiana	On the 4900 block of Knights Way, Bland was shot and killed during a hostage situation, where he held a knife against a woman's neck. At some point in Bland's encounter with police, an officer discharged their weapon and shot him dead.
2023-11-30	unidentified male	Unknown	Houston, Texas	Police were informed about a man, who was wanted for killing his father after an argument, attempting to steal vehicles at an elementary school. Police said that the suspect then successfully carjacked a vehicle, and an officer chased him down. The suspect then got out of the car and hijacked another vehicle, where a pursuit started. After the suspect reached a dead end, he turned towards the officer and fired a shot. The officer shot back, killing the man.
2023-11-29	Osvaldo Cueli (59)	Hispanic	Near Redland, Florida	A man was killed and a woman was detained during a police-involved shooting.
2023-11-29	Jason Campbell (44)	White	Cortez, Colorado	An officer initiated a traffic stop on a vehicle with two occupants, where shots were fired and the officer was injured. The suspects fled the scene, but were quickly located by police. A shootout then ensued, leaving one of the suspects dead. A police officer was also killed during the exchange, and another officer was injured. The other suspect was taken into custody.
2023-11-29	Lamar Young (33)	Black	Kannapolis, North Carolina	Police attempted to arrest a man during a child predator investigation. The man had been chatting online with someone who he thought was a 15-year old girl, and thought that he would be meeting her for sex. When officers entered his home in an attempt to arrest him, he resisted, and then opened fire at them. Officers shot back, killing the man.
2023-11-29	William Joseph O'Neill (40)	Unknown race	Lancaster, PA	
2023-11-28	Fred Perkins (78)	Black	South Fulton, Georgia	A woman called 9-1-1 to report an incident of sexual assault perpetrated by Perkins. She added that Perkins had shot at her and hit her with his gun. When officers responded, Perkins shot at them with a shotgun. Officers returned fire, and Perkins retreated to a shed. SWAT units were called to the scene, and Perkins was found not moving in the shed. Units determined that he died from injuries sustained during the shootout.
2023-11-28	James Salanoa (22)	Pacific Islander	Puyallup, Washington	A man was shot and killed by deputies near South Hill Mall following a police pursuit.
2023-11-27	Gregory Skane (48)	White	Philadelphia, Pennsylvania	Skane stabbed and wounded three people at Walnut–Locust station. He was shot by SEPTA police officers and died of his injuries on December 11.
2023-11-27	Steven Lopez (45)	Hispanic	San Antonio, Texas	San Antonio police attempted to perform a traffic stop on a vehicle with two occupants. Both occupants fled, and one took out a firearm during the pursuit. The suspect who pulled the gun was shot and killed by police.
2023-11-26	David Oh (53)	Asian	Bakersfield, California	Police responded to the death of an elderly woman to find her son, Oh, who had an active felony warrant. Oh was shot and killed by police after he allegedly brandished a knife.
2023-11-26	Adam Lee Ybarra (37)	Hispanic	Pecos, TX	
2023-11-26	Matthew Williams (31)	White	Eureka, California	After police performed a traffic stop on Williams, he fled the scene. He was found by police near the back of a library. A physical altercation occurred when officers attempted to detain Williams, and Williams allegedly took out a firearm, leading to him being shot and killed.
2023-11-25	Troy Jameson Normil (28)	Black	Saint Thomas, U.S. Virgin Islands	Normil allegedly fired a gun at Market Square, wounding a bystander. Responding officers shot and killed him.
2023-11-25	Jalina Anglin (5)	Black	Auburndale, Florida	A police truck responding to an emergency collided with a Kia sedan. A woman driving the sedan was treated for minor injuries, but a child in the rear seat died at hospital.
2023-11-25	Pete Martinez	White	Albuquerque, New Mexico	Martinez was shot and killed by police after allegedly brandishing a firearm.
2023-11-25	Robert Pitcher (51)	White	Las Vegas, Nevada	Pitcher was fatally shot after he approached officers with a knife.
2023-11-25	unidentified male	Unknown	Los Banos, California	Police responded to a trespassing, where they found a man waving a handgun. Officers opened fire during the confrontation, killing the suspect.
2023-11-24	Arnel Redfern (52)	Black	Parkville, Maryland	Police arrived to the scene of a domestic disturbance, where they came under gunfire by the suspect. Redfern was fatally shot when officers fired back. An investigation revealed that another person, 48-year-old Maxine Redfern, was fatally shot by Redfern inside the home.
2023-11-24	Justin Jordan (32)	White	Salem, Oregon	Police responded to a disturbance in eastern Salem. The suspect was reportedly armed and firing into vehicles along the street. When police arrived, they shot and injured the suspect, who later died at a hospital.
2023-11-24	Skyler Wentworth (33)	White	Ocala, Florida	Wentworth led police on a two-county car chase before crashing into a pole. Wentworth was shot and killed by police after allegedly exiting his vehicle with a rifle.
2023-11-23	Christofe “Christopher” Wita (44)	Unknown	Waterford Township, New Jersey	An off-duty police officer driving a "department vehicle" struck and killed a pedestrian along U.S. Route 30.
2023-11-23	DeMarcus Brodie (50)	Black	Fayetteville, North Carolina	Brodie was shot and killed by an officer in a physical altercation between him and officers during a traffic stop.
2023-11-23	Joshua Reese (27)	White	Pahrump, Nevada	A deputy with the Nye County Sheriffs Office shot and killed Reese at the intersection of Basin Avenue and Dahlia street. Police say that Reese, a robbery suspect, disarmed the deputy during a physical altercation before the deputy took the gun and shot Reese.
2023-11-23	Iris Billy (30)	Native American	Fort Apache Indian Reservation, Arizona	An on-duty White Mountain Apache police officer struck and killed Billy in a hit-and-run. The officer later returned to the scene while responding to the call and informed Billy's family of her death.
2023-11-22	Turell Campbell (30)	Black	Washington, D.C.	In the 1100 block of M Street, Campbell died and a US Park Police officer was wounded after a shootout.
2023-11-22	Steven Murphy (44)	White	Murfreesboro, Tennessee	Murphy attempted to rob an armored truck, but ran away after the driver took out a weapon. Murphy then went to a restaurant and attempted to rob it instead. After arriving at the restaurant, he chased an employee until they ran outside, where the man was encountered by an officer. Murphy was shot and killed after not obeying the officer's orders.
2023-11-21	Dustin Phillips (34)	White	Sharpsburg, Georgia	
2023-11-20	Michelle Freestone (79)	White	Marshfield, Massachusetts	Freestone was killed when her Subaru Forester collided with a police-owned armored vehicle.
2023-11-20	Charles Staudenmayer (54)	White	Upland, California	
2023-11-20	Anthony Wayne Fields (33)	White	Nicholasville, Kentucky	A deputy with the Jessamine County Sheriff’s Office was involved in an officer involved shooting on the railroad tracks near Wilmore Road and Baybrook Circle.
2023-11-20	Nate Landrebe (42)	White	Franklin, New Hampshire	A man shot at neighbors and police officers and set his apartment complex on fire. During an exchange of gunfire with officers, the shooter was struck and died.
2023-11-20	Allen Seibert (78)	White	Plumerville, Arkansas	Seibert allegedly brandished a firearm during a search warrant, causing officers to shoot and kill him.
2023-11-20	Joshua T. Mitchell (42)	White	Denver, Colorado	Police were called about a man armed with a “long gun” who was yelling and chasing people. When officers arrived, they gave commands to the man, but received no response. The man then started firing at the officer's vehicles, prompting them to shoot back, fatally striking him.
2023-11-20	John Joseph Hampton (32)	White	Oneonta, Alabama	Police received a call about a suspicious man knocking on doors of homes. When officers arrived, Hampton ran into a wooded area. Officers pursued him, leading to a brief standoff. Hampton then brandished a gun and exchanged fire with officers. A police officer was shot in the leg, and Hampton was killed.
2023-11-19	Jackie Huff	White	Homer Glen, Illinois	A Glendale Heights police officer shot and killed his wife before killing himself.
2023-11-19	Dachena Warren-Hill (20)	Black	Fort Wayne, Indiana	Warren-Hill was shot and killed by a police officer after allegedly attempting to hit them with her vehicle.
2023-11-19	Ismael Reyes (33)	Hispanic	Sulphur, Louisiana	Police responding to a call of shots fired pursued a vehicle to a private residence. Officers shot and killed Reyes during an "interaction" with those outside the residence.
2023-11-19	Jesse Dominguez (33)	White	Los Angeles, California	After fighting with a CHP officer and allegedly using a taser against them, Dominguez was fatally shot multiple times.
2023-11-19	Patricio Gamboa (23)	White	Arlington, Texas	A man called the police with the intent of committing suicide by cop. When officers arrived to his house, he approached them with a firearm. After not complying with requests to put the weapon down, officers shot and killed the man.
2023-11-18	Gumaro Isaac Acosta (26)	Hispanic	Pueblo, Colorado	Two car thief suspects were located by police. When police attempted to make contact with the suspects, shots were fired, and one of the suspects drove the vehicle into a flea market, injuring one person. Acosta was shot and killed by police, and the other was taken into custody.
2023-11-17	Freddy Robles (29)	Hispanic	Menifee, California	Police responded to a domestic disturbance and found Robles attempting to forcibly enter his girlfriend's house. He allegedly pointed a handgun at officers, who shot him dead.
2023-11-17	Leandre Krushaun Houston (31)	Black	Indianapolis, Indiana	Police attempted to perform a traffic stop on a vehicle with two occupants inside. After the driver refused to pull over, a chase ensued. Both occupants fled the car when the chase ended. The passenger, Houston, was shot and killed by police after allegedly pulling out an object from his waist.
2023-11-17	Denise Sonia Palacios Pangelinan (47)	Hispanic	Bremerton, WA	
2023-11-17	Shaun Luzama (49)	Native Hawaiian or Pacific Islander	Bremerton, Washington	After police attempted to arrest a homicide suspect, he barricaded himself inside of his home while firing shots at police, starting an hours-long standoff. Luzama was killed after he was shot by officers.
2023-11-17	John Madore (33)	White	Concord, New Hampshire	Madore was shot and killed by a trooper after fatally shooting another person at New Hampshire Hospital.
2023-11-16	Richard Michael Pyorre (53)	White	Lakeport, California	A man with a knife was shot and killed by police after he allegedly attacked officers.
2023-11-16	William L. Hayes (28)	White	Fort Collins, Colorado	Police responded to a man yelling racial epithets and attacking people with pepper spray. The suspect allegedly advanced on officers with an "edged weapon" and was tased. When the suspect continued to walk towards police, they fatally shot him.
2023-11-16	Jeremy Dale Adams (39)	Unknown	Shannon Hills, Arkansas	Police responded to an intoxicated and combative man. Adams allegedly resisted arrest and was fatally shot by an officer in unclear circumstances.
2023-11-16	Franklin O. Ross (43)	White	Federal Way, Washington	A man was shot and killed by police after he allegedly charged officers with a knife as they responded to a domestic violence call.
2023-11-16	Marcos Guerra	Hispanic	Weatherford, Texas	Police were serving a warrant when they say a man opened fire, striking a police dog. Officers returned fire, killing the shooter.
2023-11-15	Name Withheld (17)	Unknown race	East Bloomfield, NY	
2023-11-15	Matthew Alexander Rich (40)	White	Copperhill, Tennessee	Rich opened fire on police officers while they served a probation violation warrant at his house. Officers returned fire, killing Rich.
2023-11-15	Tinse Peterson (23)	Black	Avondale, Arizona	Police responded to a call of a man waving a gun at people. Peterson was shot after he fired a handgun at officers.
2023-11-15	Joseph Black (48)	White	Magna, Utah	Police were responding to reports of shots being fired. An officer spotted Black enter a home and determined that a woman was inside as well. Black was fatally shot after police believed that he had just shot a woman. After the shooting, police discovered that the woman was unharmed.
2023-11-15	Peter Luna-Lopez (26)	Hispanic	Cobb County, Georgia	Lopez was shot and killed after attempting to flee a traffic stop.
2023-11-14	Sonny Holland Sr. (43)	White	Venus, Florida	
2023-11-14	Benard Russell (67)	Black	Garfield Heights, Ohio	
2023-11-14	Imanol Aparicio (22)	Hispanic	San Diego, California	In the 4000 block of Wightman Street, Aparicio shot and wounded his ex-girlfriend inside an apartment building. A short time later, Aparicio was confronted by two SDPD police officers at the intersection of 41st and Wightman. A foot ensured and after running into a nearby alley, Aparicio pulled out a handgun. He was then shot by SDPD officers. Aparicio later died at a hospital.
2023-11-13	Joseph Ramos (46)	Hispanic	Albuquerque, New Mexico	
2023-11-13	unidentified male	Unknown	Los Angeles, California	A man wanted for marijuana distribution and money laundering charges was shot and killed by marshals in the Mid-City area. The man brandished a firearm during his arrest, prompting the marshals to fatally shoot him.
2023-11-13	David Simmons Jr. (40)	White	Berrien County, Michigan	A shootout between the suspect and three officers occurred after police responded to a domestic incident. An officer was wounded during the exchange of fire, and the suspect was killed.
2023-11-13	Randall Adjessom (16)	Black	Mobile, Alabama	Police conducted a search warrant related to marijuana, when they encountered Adjessom who was allegedly armed with a laser-sighted handgun. Adjessom allegedly pointed the gun at officers, causing them to fatally shoot him.
2023-11-13	Curtis Lee Lindsey (47)	White	McRae, AR	
2023-11-13	Rene Calderon (45)	Hispanic	Mesa, Arizona	Two suspects in a car stopped at a Mexican restaurant. A person believed to be a victim was also in the car. One of the suspects went inside, and the other one stayed in the car. Officers tried to get the suspect out of the vehicle, but fatally shot them after they allegedly took out a “lethal” weapon. Two officers suffered minor injuries from the incident.
2023-11-12	Joel Skelton (29)	White	Nashville, Tennessee	Skelton and McGee were killed when their Ford Mustang and an off-duty police officer's pickup truck collided.
2023-11-12	Patrick McGee (22)	White	Nashville, Tennessee	Skelton and McGee were killed when their Ford Mustang and an off-duty police officer's pickup truck collided.
2023-11-12	Nicholas Bruington (17)	White	Bismarck, North Dakota	Bruington was under investigation for the shooting of another juvenile. He was confronted by police in the parking lot of Kirkwood Mall. Officers then shot and killed Bruington. Police claimed that he was armed and didn't comply with their commands.
2023-11-12	Joseph Michael Ramos (46)	Hispanic	Los Ranchos, NM	
2023-11-11	Wyatt Franzoy (1)	White	Deming, NM	
2023-11-11	David Umpmreyville (57)	White	Flowery Branch, Georgia	
2023-11-11	Jaime Valdez (33)	Hispanic	Fontana, California	The suspect was shot and killed by an officer after making threats towards family members. Another officer sustained injuries during the incident.
2023-11-11	Jafeth Torres-Diaz (19)	Hispanic	Houston, Texas	Diaz, a carjacking suspect, was shot and killed in a shootout with Houston Police Department officers. The shootout occurred after a police chase. An officer was also injured during the shootout.
2023-11-11	Ahmed Mohamed Nassar (35)	Arab	Austin, Texas	An Austin Police Department SWAT team was called and an evacuation of residents in the area was ordered after a disturbance and potential hostage situation inside a house in Bernoulli Drive. A shootout ensued between Nassar and SWAT members. A member of the SWAT team was killed and another was injured during the standoff, and Nassar was shot and killed. Two civilians were also found dead in the house, and another was sent to the hospital.
2023-11-10	Darrell Fowler	Black	San Bernardino, California	Police stopped a vehicle for multiple vehicle code violations. The driver, Fowler, allegedly reached for a handgun and pointed it at officers, causing officers to shoot and kill Fowler.
2023-11-10	unidentified suspect	Unknown	Las Vegas, Nevada	
2023-11-09	Azjaynee Owens-Bey (31)	Black	Oklahoma City, Oklahoma	Police responded to a domestic call between Owens-Bey and his girlfriend. Owens-Bey was allegedly spotted by police threatening apartment complex residents with a firearm. Owens-Bey exchanged gunfire with police before abandoning the weapon; as he picked it up, officers shot and killed him.
2023-11-09	unidentified male (16)	White	Sandy, Utah	The 16-year-old boy died after he was shot Sandy Police officer while driving past the officer in a stolen grey Chrysler Pacifica. The boy died of his injuries at a hospital.
2023-11-09	Chad McGraw (52)	Black	Euclid, Ohio	
2023-11-08	Donald Ball (41)	White	Kamas, Utah	A deputy observed a vehicle registered to a man with an active arrest warrant. The deputy attempted to pull over Ball, but he didn't stop and led them on a chase. Ball crashed on Bench Creek Road, and then allegedly advanced towards deputies with a large blunt object. He was shot and killed soon after.
2023-11-08	Robert Berry (56)	White	Mooresvile, North Carolina	Police responded to a call about an armed man arriving at a hospital and threatening to harm himself. When officers arrived, they commanded him to put down his gun. The man was initially compliant, but then picked the gun back up. He was then shot and killed.
2023-11-08	Eriberto Penaloza (38)	Hispanic	Long Beach, California	Officers responded to a stabbing at a north Long Beach home and encounter Penaloza, who had stabbed his mother. Police shot and killed him when he allegedly approached officers still holding the knife. Penaloza's mother was treated for non-threatening injuries.
2023-11-07	Justin McCarrell (36)	Black	Greenville, South Carolina	Police conducted a narcotics investigation at a home. McCarrell, a resident of the home, was shot and killed by a deputy after he allegedly armed himself.
2023-11-07	Lance Levie (37)	White	Monroe, Louisiana	The suspect was shot and killed by deputies on Ray Drive.
2023-11-07	Hunter Jessup (27)	Black	Baltimore, Maryland	Police on Brunswick Street encountered Jessup who was believed to be armed. Jessup then tried to flee and then allegedly pointed a handgun at an officer who attempted to tackle him. Other officers at the scene opened fire, killing Jessup.
2023-11-07	Cameron Alan Easton (33)	White	Headland, Alabama	A man was shot and killed by deputies after a nearly 50 mile pursuit. The pursuit ended when the suspect crashed his car, which was believed to be stolen, in the median of U.S. 431 in Headland. Illegal drugs were found in the car.
2023-11-07	Lloyd Dillard (52)	Black	Oakland, California	The suspect confronted an officer near Oakland City Hall. They then began to shoot at the officer, who shot the suspect in response. The suspect died at the scene.
2023-11-06	Jose Antonio Medina (58)	Hispanic	Wright, Florida	Medina was shot and killed by police after allegedly shooting at officers responding to a domestic violence call.
2023-11-06	Tranza Campbell (32)	Black	Chicago, Illinois	In the South Shore neighborhood, Campbell was approached by four Chicago Police officers. Campbell then ran and the officers chased him. During the chase, Campbell allegedly shot in the direction of the officers, striking one in the arm. Campbell was then shot by police.
2023-11-06	David Bonino (39)	White	Berkeley, California	One suspect was killed by police and two other suspects were arrested during an auto burglary.
2023-11-06	Noah Magallan (21)	Hispanic	Lubbock, Texas	Police responded to a domestic disturbance report, where Magallan allegedly used “deadly force” against the officers. Police then shot and killed Magallan.
2023-11-05	Zachary Wolfscott (36)	White	Citrus Heights, California	Wolfscott fled California Highway Patrol officers in a high-speed chase before colliding with a motorcyclist. He was shot dead by police after he allegedly brandished a knife and advanced towards officers.
2023-11-05	Fleen Myles III (33)	Black	Shreveport, Louisiana	Myles III fled a traffic stop and was shot and killed by police after allegedly brandishing a handgun.
2023-11-05	Graciela Reza-Contreras (59)	Hispanic	DeKalb, Illinois	Reza-Contreras was killed in a two-car crash between her family's car and an off-duty police officer's vehicle. The officer was charged with reckless homicide and driving under the influence.
2023-11-05	Matias Yosino (19)	Hispanic	Ogden, Utah	An intoxicated man was shot and killed by officers after repeatedly pointing a handgun at them and refusing to drop it.
2023-11-05	Mark Chambers (40)	White	Churchville, Pennsylvania	Chambers, who was allegedly armed with a knife, was shot and killed after police swarmed a neighborhood. An officer suffered injuries from the incident.
2023-11-05	Jesse Brown Hernandez (22)	Hispanic	McLean, Virginia	Three off-duty United States Park Police officers, including Hernandez and Alexander Roy, were inside an apartment complex. Roy attempted to dry fire his gun that he thought was unloaded, but ended up accidentally shooting Hernandez. Hernandez died at the scene, and Roy was charged with involuntary manslaughter.
2023-11-04	Thomas Nock (27)	White	North Olmsted, Ohio	Nock invaded a home and shot and killed a man before setting the house on fire. As officers arrived, they and Nock exchanged gunfire, fatally wounding the suspect and injuring an officer.
2023-11-04	Anthony Barnhill (34)	White	Bluffton, South Carolina	Barnhill was killed in an exchange of gunfire with police following a high-speed chase.
2023-11-04	Dustin Alan Rush (42)	White	Nocatee, Florida	Rush was wanted for an armed burglary. He fled the scene of the burglary in a pickup truck, which led police on a pursuit that ended at Davis Park. Rush was killed after a shootout with deputies at the park.
2023-11-04	Max Sosa Jr. (33)	Hispanic	Fresno, California	Officers were called to an apartment complex over reports of a suicidal man. When officers arrived, a man in a car presumed to be the suspect accelerated towards them before driving off, starting a pursuit. Officers lost sight of the suspect. The suspect returned to the apartment complex, where he was spotted by police. The suspect ran towards officers with a pair of scissors, prompting them to shoot and kill him.
2023-11-03	Douglas Quinn (48)	White	Escondido, California	Police responded to a trespassing call at a trailer park. Upon arrival, they spotted the suspect, a parolee, and stopped him for questioning. The suspect began to run and allegedly opened fire as police attempted to detain him. He was shot and killed shortly after.
2023-11-03	Paul Vincent Noeller (57)	White	Citrus County, Florida	Noeller poured gasoline all over a house and yard and lit a fire, burning the house down. He then began to shoot in the direction of police, causing him to be shot and killed.
2023-11-02	Christopher Sewell (29)	Black	Grafton, Wisconsin	The Sewell led police on a pursuit after deputies attempted to pull them over and arrest them for felony warrants. Police used a tire deflation device to stop Sewell, causing him to crash into a nearby tree line. Sewell was shot and killed by deputy Michael Zilke after allegedly presenting a weapon.
2023-11-01	Rudy Chavira (36)	Hispanic	Dallas, Texas	Deputies attempted to pull Chavira over on Interstate 30 under suspicion that he was “carrying a substantial amount of narcotics”. Chavira drove away, leading to a pursuit that ended in a shootout near Dalrock Road. Chavira was shot and killed by deputies. The lanes over Lake Ray Hubbard were temporarily closed in response to the shooting. Deputies found twelve kilograms of cocaine in Chavira's vehicle.
2023-11-01	S.A. Floyd (67)	Unknown	Spirit Lake, Idaho	Spirit Lake Police responding to a mental health call encountered Floyd, who was legally blind, at a senior living apartment building. For unknown reasons, a Spirit Lake Police officer shot Floyd. Police said a gun was found in her room.
2023-11-01	Michael Grimes (45)	Unknown	Near Healy, Alaska	Grimes was shot and killed in a shootout with Alaska State Troopers on the Parks Highway after a police chase.
2023-11-01	Benjamin Pritchard (35)	White	Calabasas, California	Police responded to a call about a man armed with a machete, who had attacked someone outside of a McDonald's. The victim was able to disarm the suspect of his machete, who then pulled out a knife. Upon police arrival, the suspect ran towards the parking lot of a restaurant, where he was shot and killed by police.
2023-11-01	Brandon T. Decker (27)	White	Sims, Indiana	Police were responding to reports of a man armed with a pellet gun threatening to shoot a car. When an officer attempted to place Decker in custody, he began throwing knives in his direction. The officer initially used his taser, but then switched to his handgun and fatally shot Decker.
2023-11-01	Jason Pass (47)	Black	New York City, New York	Police in Gravesend attempted to arrest Pass, who was wanted for killing a father and son in East Flatbush, Brooklyn several days prior. Pass allegedly pulled out a knife and charged at officers, who shot and killed him.

== See also ==
- Death in custody § United States
- Henry A. Wallace Police Crime Public Database
- List of cases of police brutality
- List of countries with annual rates and counts for killings by law enforcement officers
- List of law enforcement officers killed in the line of duty in the United States
- List of law enforcement officers convicted for an on-duty killing in the United States
- List of shootings by US immigration agents
- List of police reforms related to the George Floyd protests
- List of unarmed African Americans killed by law enforcement officers in the United States
- Lists of killings by law enforcement officers
- Police brutality in the United States
- Police misconduct § United States
- Police riot § United States
- Police use of deadly force in the United States
