= Red Notice (film) =

2021 action comedy film by Rawson Marshall Thurber

- Release poster
- Directed by: Rawson Marshall Thurber
- Written by: Rawson Marshall Thurber
- Produced by: Beau Flynn; Dwayne Johnson; Dany Garcia; Rawson Marshall Thurber; Hiram Garcia
- Starring: Dwayne Johnson; Ryan Reynolds; Gal Gadot; Ritu Arya; Chris Diamantopoulos
- Cinematography: Markus Förderer
- Edited by: Mike Sale; Julian Clarke
- Music by: Steve Jablonsky
- Production companies: Seven Bucks Productions; FlynnPictureCo.; Bad Version, Inc.
- Distributed by: Netflix
- Release date: November 5, 2021
- Running time: 118 minutes
- Country: United States
- Language: English
- Budget: $200 million
- Box office: $2 million

Red Notice is a 2021 American action comedy film written and directed by Rawson Marshall Thurber starring Dwayne Johnson alongside Ryan Reynolds, Gal Gadot, and Ritu Arya. It marks the third collaboration between Thurber and Johnson, following Central Intelligence (2016) and Skyscraper (2018). In the film, an FBI agent reluctantly teams up with a renowned art thief in order to catch an even more notorious thief.

Originally planned for release by Universal Pictures, the film was acquired by Netflix for distribution. It began a limited theatrical release on November 5, 2021, before digitally streaming on the platform on November 12, 2021. It received mixed reviews; critics criticized its plot and screenwriting but praised Johnson's and Reynolds' performance, as well as the action sequences and humor. Netflix claims the film became the most-watched film in its debut weekend, as well as having been the most-watched film on the platform until being surpassed by KPop Demon Hunters in 2025. It also became the 5th most-streamed movie title of 2021. Two sequels are in development and will be filmed back-to-back with Johnson, Reynolds, Gadot, and Thurber expected to return.

== Plot ==
During the 1st century BC, Roman general Mark Antony gives Egyptian queen Cleopatra three bejeweled eggs as a wedding gift. The eggs are lost in time until two are found by a farmer in 1907, but the last one remains lost for over 2,000 years.

In the present, John Hartley is an FBI profiler who investigates the theft of one of the eggs on display at the Museo Nazionale di Castel Sant'Angelo in Rome, along with Interpol agent Urvashi Das. Having stolen the egg, globally wanted art thief Nolan Booth manages to escape but finds Hartley and the Interpol at his home in Bali. They arrest Booth, but not before Booth's main rival Sarah "The Bishop" Black steals the egg and frames Hartley.

Das has Hartley incarcerated in a remote Russian prison with Booth, believing he is responsible for the theft. Hartley suggests that he and Booth work together to defeat Black. If he helps Hartley imprison her, Booth will be the number one art thief in the world and Hartley's name will be cleared. The pair escapes from prison and heads for Valencia to steal the second egg, currently in possession of arms dealer Sotto Voce.

They infiltrate his masquerade ball and fight Black in Voce's vault for the egg. Black reveals she is working with Voce and they torture Hartley until Booth reveals the location of the third egg. Black betrays Voce and leaves for Egypt, where Booth claims it is.

Booth reveals to Hartley that he lied; the egg is actually in Argentina in a secret location inscribed on his late father's special watch, which once belonged to Adolf Hitler's personal art curator Rudolph Zeich. Searching the jungle, they find a secret bunker containing Nazi artifacts, including the third egg. Black arrives to steal it but the three are interrupted by Das and police. Hartley, Booth and Black escape in an antique 1931 Mercedes-Benz 770.

Booth learns that Hartley is actually not an FBI profiler, but a conman, and shares the Bishop mantle with Black; Hartley and Black are a couple and work as a team. They had planned the entire heist from the very beginning, using Booth to take them to the third egg. Booth surrenders and they leave him handcuffed.

In Cairo, Hartley and Black deliver the three eggs to an Egyptian billionaire as a gift for his daughter's wedding. They then double-cross him; Interpol raids the wedding and arrests the billionaire.

Six months later, Hartley and Black find Booth on their boat in Sardinia. He informs them that he told Das about their Cayman Islands account containing the $300 million payout for the eggs, which Das freezes, leaving them with no money, in retaliation for leaving him cuffed.

Booth also reveals that Interpol is on their way to capture them, and offers escape if they help him with a new heist, which requires three individuals to pull off. They agree and Das places red notices on all of them. The trio begin casing the Louvre in Paris for their next heist.

== Cast ==
- Dwayne Johnson as John Hartley
- Ryan Reynolds as Nolan Booth
- Gal Gadot as Sarah Black / The Bishop
- Chris Diamantopoulos as Sotto Voce
- Ritu Arya as Inspector Urvashi Das
- Ivan Mbakop as Tambwe
- Vincenzo Amato as Director Gallo
- Rafael Petardi as Security Chief Ricci
- Brenna Marie Narayan as Cleopatra

Additionally, Daniel Bernhardt has a cameo appearance as Drago Grande, and singer-songwriter Ed Sheeran makes an uncredited cameo as himself.

== Production ==
=== Development ===
On February 8, 2018, it was announced that major studios were fighting a bidding war for the rights to an action comedy from Dwayne Johnson and writer-director Rawson Marshall Thurber. Universal Pictures, Warner Bros. Pictures, Sony Pictures and Paramount Pictures were all considered. The film would be produced by Beau Flynn through his FlynnPictureCo. banner, and by Johnson, Dany Garcia and Hiram Garcia through their Seven Bucks Productions banner, along with Thurber's Bad Version Inc., with Wendy Jacobson executive producing. The following day, it was announced that Universal and Legendary had won the bidding war.

Gal Gadot was confirmed to star opposite Johnson in June 2018, and Ryan Reynolds was added in July 2019. Ritu Arya and Chris Diamantopoulos were also cast in February 2020.

Johnson, Reynolds, and Gadot were all paid $20 million each to star in the film, while Thurber was paid $10 million to write and direct.

At a budget of $200 million, Red Notice was Netflix's most expensive original film until 2022's The Gray Man.

=== Filming ===
Principal photography began on January 3, 2020, in Atlanta, Georgia. Production on the film was previously expected to start in April 2019, after Johnson wrapped filming on Jumanji: The Next Level. On July 8, 2019, filming was delayed to early 2020. A planned shoot in Italy was canceled due to the COVID-19 pandemic in the country. On March 14, it was announced production had been halted indefinitely due to the COVID-19 pandemic overall.

Filming resumed on September 14, 2020. Reynolds and Gadot completed filming their scenes by the end of October. Production in Atlanta was completed on November 14, before moving to Rome and Sardinia, Italy for a week of shooting. Filming in Italy was completed on November 18. The film was greenlit with an estimated production budget of $160 million and by the time it was released the reported cost had reached $200 million, making it the most expensive film in Netflix's history.

Visual effects artist Richard R. Hoover served as the overall visual effects supervisor for the film.

Red Notice is one of the first feature films to extensively use the first-person view (FPV) drone flying for cinematography. FPV drone pilot Johnny Schaer participated in filming.

== Music ==
On February 26, 2020, Steve Jablonsky was announced as the composer for Red Notice. Jablonsky previously collaborated with director Rawson Marshall Thurber scoring Skyscraper in 2018. Other pieces include "Sabotage" by the Beastie Boys, "Época" by the Gotan Project, "Amado Mio" by Pink Martini, "Downtown" written by Tony Hatch, The Raider's March by John Williams, "Libertango by Astor Piazzolla", "Perfect" by Ed Sheeran, and "Notorious B.I.G." by The Notorious B.I.G., with "On the Run" by Naz Tokio heard throughout the closing credits.

== Release ==
Universal originally scheduled the film for release on June 12, 2020. The date was postponed by five months to November 13, 2020. Netflix then took over on July 8, 2019, moving the film to an unspecified date in 2021. As part of a video and letter to its shareholders in April 2021, Netflix's co-chief executive officer and chief content officer Ted Sarandos confirmed that the film would premiere sometime in Q4 2021. The film received a limited theatrical release on November 5, 2021, prior to streaming on Netflix on November 12, 2021. Reynolds requested that Welsh language subtitles be provided for the film's Netflix release.

== Marketing ==
In the Philippines, the SM Mall of Asia's globe was reportedly stolen by a helicopter on November 13, 2021. The Pasay city police issued a statement that the globe was not stolen and was just "undergoing maintenance for marketing strategy". The globe was covered in scaffolding. The mall management released a statement a day later that the globe is "back" and revealed that the supposed theft was staged as part of a publicity stunt to promote Red Notice. The marketing promotion caused the globe to be a trending subject on Twitter.

The film also saw a promotional tie-in with professional wrestling promotion WWE, the company where Dwayne Johnson had wrestled and became famously known as "The Rock". In addition to promoting the film during their Survivor Series event on November 21, 2021, a storyline was also played out involving one of Cleopatra's eggs that was stolen during the show.

== Reception ==
=== Audience viewership ===
Due to the film's $200 million production budget and Netflix's global film chief Scott Stuber's statement that the company's "big-budget tentpole films [need] to draw an audience of more than 70 million viewers within the first 28 days of availability," The New York Observer estimated Red Notice would need to total around 200 million hours (about 83 million household viewers) to be deemed a success.

The film became the most-viewed film on Netflix during release day. According to Samba TV, it was watched by 4.2 million households in the United States, 721,000 in the United Kingdom, 332,000 in Germany, and 42,000 in Australia over its first three days of release. TV Time reported that it was the second most-streamed film in the United States during its debut weekend. The top 10 Netflix weekly rankings for English-language films showed that it was the most-streamed film with 148.72 million hours watched. This was the highest viewership for any film on Netflix during its debut weekend. It was also ranked in the top 10 Netflix charts in 94 countries. According to Nielsen it was the most-streamed film in the United States, with 1.8 billion minutes viewed and age ranges of 18–34, 35–49 and 50–64 making up a quarter each of its audience.

Within eleven days of its release, it displaced Bird Box to become the most-watched film on Netflix until it was surpassed by KPop Demon Hunters in 2025. The fourth week saw Red Notice being displaced to the third position on Netflix's chart. Netflix revealed on December 28, 2021, that Red Notice accumulated a viewership of 364.02 million hours in its first 28 days of release. According to Samba TV, the film was watched in 9.8 million households in its first 30 days of release. Nielsen stated that it was the fifth most-streamed-film in the US in 2021 with 5,528 million minutes viewed. It remained in the top 10 rankings for English-language films on Netflix for three months since its release before dropping out. The film also topped the new Netflix viewership metric released in June 2023 with 230.9 million views.

=== Box office ===
While Netflix does not disclose theatrical box office grosses of their films, Deadline Hollywood estimated the film grossed $1.25–$1.5 million from 750 theaters in its opening weekend. By November 15, the running theatrical gross was "well north" of $2 million.

=== Critical response ===
On review aggregator Rotten Tomatoes, 37% of 175 critics have given the film a positive review, with an average rating of 4.8/10. The website's critics consensus reads, "Red Notice's big budget and A-list cast add up to a slickly competent action comedy whose gaudy ingredients only make the middling results more head-scratching." On Metacritic, the film has a weighted average score of 37 out of 100, based on 38 critics, indicating "generally unfavorable reviews".

Peter Debruge of Variety called the film a "fun, fast-paced and frequently amusing divertissement," and wrote, "It's all reasonably clever, so long as you don't scrutinize it too closely. Red Notice may be Thurber's spin on National Treasure, with just as much DNA from the RKO classic Gunga Din." David Rooney of The Hollywood Reporter stated, "You can't argue with the muscular marquee value of headlining Dwayne Johnson, Ryan Reynolds and Gal Gadot in a slick, fast-paced action thriller laced with playful comedy, even if it's an empty-calorie entertainment like Red Notice." Reviewing the film for the Los Angeles Times, Justin Chang wrote, "A depressing reminder of what Hollywood considers 'original' material these days, Red Notice plays one of those self-consciously convoluted, ultimately derivative long cons that strain so hard to seem breezily insouciant they wind up wearing you out. By the end, it's the clichés that warrant a rest."

=== Accolades ===
Red Notice received a nomination for Best Action at the 2022 Golden Trailer Awards. Thurber was nominated for Oglethorpe Award for Excellence in Georgia Cinema at the 2021 Georgia Film Critics Association Awards.

== Future ==
Beginning in August 2020, there were reports that Netflix was looking to develop a sequel to Red Notice. In November 2021, Hiram Garcia announced that there were tentative plans for a sequel, stating that Thurber had officially pitched a sequel and that all creatives involved were optimistic regarding its development, while announcing that Netflix had officially told them that they were interested in continuing the film series. The producer later said that the potential sequel would include the trio of stars involved in additional heists around the world, while reaffirming that its development was dependent on the reception to the first film.

Johnson celebrated the positive audience reception to Red Notice on his social media, saying that there was "more to come." Following announcements that the release set the record all-time viewership for Netflix, Johnson further teased a future film announcement. Thurber later said that if a sequel was greenlit, he intends to film two sequels back-to-back. In December 2021, Hiram Garcia once again discussed plans for a sequel, stating that the end of Red Notice sets up the story.

By January 2022, it was announced that the two sequels were officially in development and would be filmed back-to-back. Thurber was set to return as writer/director, while Johnson, Reynolds, and Gadot were all set to reprise their respective roles. The sequels would also feature a number of supporting cast, with an ensemble cast planned similar to the Ocean's franchise. Johnson, Hiram Garcia, Dany Garcia, Thurber, and Beau Flynn were all set to return as producers. The films were to be joint-venture productions between Seven Bucks Productions, Flynn Pictures Co, Bad Version Productions, and Netflix Original Films. Netflix was set to return as the distributor for the two sequels. In October 2022, it was announced that the script for the second film was finished, while work on the screenplay for the third movie was ongoing. In the same interview, producers Hiram Garcia and Flynn confirmed that the sequels were being developed to be filmed consecutively.
