= Beau Flynn =

American film producer

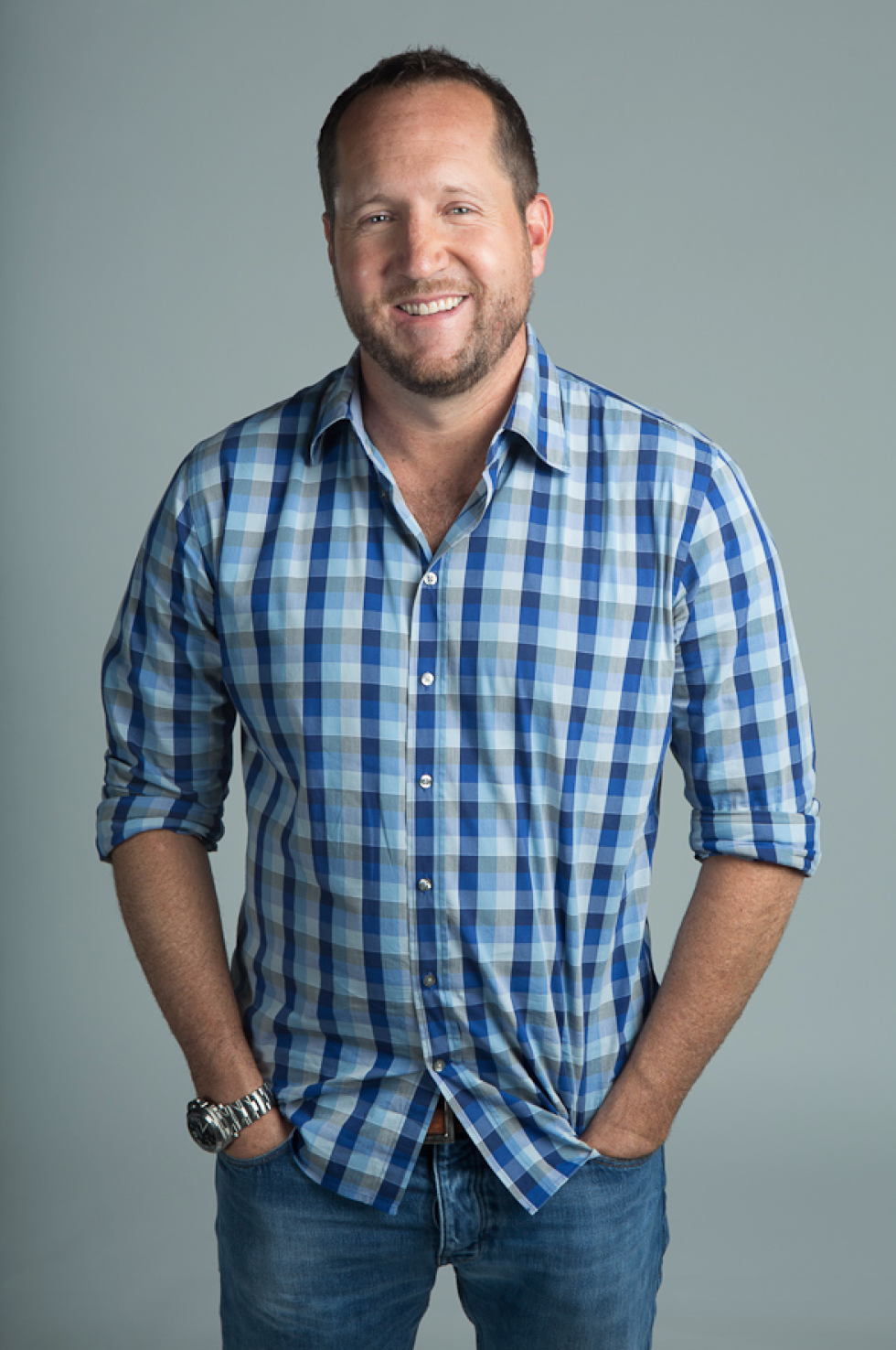
- Flynn in 2018
- Born: March 23, 1970 (age 56); Miami, Florida, U.S.
- Occupation: Film producer
- Years active: 1994–present
- Spouse: Marley Shelton (m. 2001)
- Children: 2

Beau Flynn (born March 23, 1970) is an American film producer. He is best known for producing blockbuster films such as Skyscraper, Rampage, San Andreas, and Hercules, all of which starred Dwayne Johnson. Flynn has also produced independent films, including Requiem for a Dream, Tigerland, Choke, and The House of Yes.

== Career ==
Flynn has been a member of The Academy of Motion Picture Arts and Sciences and the Producers Guild of America for over 18 years. His first job in the industry was as an executive assistant to producer Scott Rudin.

Flynn has often worked with actor Dwayne Johnson, including on the 2018 action films Skyscraper and Rampage.

Flynn's 2015 release, San Andreas, based on his own original idea, was New Line Cinema and Warner Bros. most successful film of the year, grossing $475 million worldwide. A few of FPC's other titles include: Baywatch, Hansel & Gretel: Witch Hunters, Journey 2: The Mysterious Island, The Rite, and Journey to the Center of the Earth.

Flynn produced the Disney film Jungle Cruise, based on the iconic theme park ride, which began shooting in May 2018. This was Flynn's seventh collaboration with Johnson, who also starred with Emily Blunt. After Jungle Cruise, Flynn and Johnson collaborated again with Rawson Marshall Thurber on the film Red Notice, an international action-thriller they produced for Netflix. FlynnPictureCo's latest release was in 2022 DC Comics / WB / NewLine "Black Adam" starring Dwayne Johnson, Pierce Brosnan, Quintessa Swindell and Noah Centineo.

=== Future projects ===
FPC's future projects include: a live action adaptation of the Disney animated smash film Moana starring Dwayne Johnson as Maui, a high-concept time travel action movie Undo scripted by Will Simmons and directed by Henry Joost and Rel Schulman, An Incident at Fort Bragg, a supernatural thriller based on a true story, Stillwater, an original sci-fi thriller, The 37th Parallel, Seven Wonders, both based on Ben Mezrich novels; Road to Oz, a biography of L. Frank Baum, the author of The Wonderful Wizard of Oz, and an animated film based on Hello Kitty directed by David Derrick Jr. and John Aoshima

== Personal life ==
Flynn and actress Marley Shelton married in July 2001. They have two daughters.

== Filmography ==
=== Film ===
Producer

- Johns (1996)
- The House of Yes (1997)
- Little City (1997)
- Starstruck (1998)
- Judas Kiss (1998)
- Coming Soon (1999)
- Tigerland (2000)
- Bubble Boy (2001)
- Slap Her... She's French (2002)
- 11:14 (2003)
- After the Sunset (2004)
- The Exorcism of Emily Rose (2005)
- The Wild (2006)
- The Guardian (2006)
- The Number 23 (2007)
- Choke (2008)
- Journey to the Center of the Earth (2008)
- The Mighty Macs (2009) (Consulting producer)
- The Rite (2011)
- What's Your Number? (2011)
- Journey 2: The Mysterious Island (2012)
- Red Dawn (2012)
- Hansel & Gretel: Witch Hunters (2013)
- Battle of the Year (2013)
- Hercules (2014)
- Two Night Stand (2014)
- San Andreas (2015)
- Solace (2015)
- Baywatch (2017)
- Rampage (2018)
- Skyscraper (2018)
- Jungle Cruise (2021)
- Red Notice (2021)
- Black Adam (2022)
- Moana (2026)
- Untitled Hello Kitty film (2028)

Executive producer

- The Alarmist (1997)
- Guinevere (1999)
- The Love Letter (1999)
- Requiem for a Dream (2000)
- Till Human Voices Wake Us (2002)
- Dallas 362 (2003)
- Murder Mystery (2019)
- Murder Mystery 2 (2023)

Assistant: Scott Rudin

- Nobody's Fool (1994)
- I.Q. (1994)

Thanks

- Pi (1998)
- Silent Men (2005)
- Girl Walks into a Bar (2011)

=== Television ===
Executive producer

- Faces of Fear (2001) (TV movie)
- Cannonball Run 2001 (2001)
- Inside Fear (2001) (Documentary)
- An American Town (2001) (TV movie)
- Fear (2000−02)

Producer

- Hatfields & McCoys (2013) (TV movie)
