= Red One (film) =

2024 film by Jake Kasdan

- Theatrical release poster
- Directed by: Jake Kasdan
- Screenplay by: Chris Morgan
- Story by: Hiram Garcia
- Produced by: Hiram Garcia; Dwayne Johnson; Dany Garcia; Chris Morgan; Jake Kasdan; Melvin Mar
- Starring: Dwayne Johnson; Chris Evans; Lucy Liu; Kiernan Shipka; Bonnie Hunt; Kristofer Hivju; Nick Kroll; Wesley Kimmel; J. K. Simmons
- Cinematography: Dan Mindel
- Edited by: Mark Helfrich; Steve Edwards; Tara Timpone
- Music by: Henry Jackman
- Production companies: Amazon MGM Studios; Seven Bucks Productions; Chris Morgan Productions; The Detective Agency; Big Indie
- Distributed by: Amazon MGM Studios (Note: Released under the Metro-Goldwyn-Mayer banner.) (United States); Warner Bros. Pictures (international)
- Release dates: November 6, 2024 (International); November 15, 2024 (United States)
- Running time: 123 minutes
- Country: United States
- Language: English
- Budget: $200–250 million
- Box office: $186 million

Red One is a 2024 American Christmas action comedy film directed by Jake Kasdan and written by Chris Morgan. It stars Dwayne Johnson, Chris Evans, Lucy Liu, J. K. Simmons, Kiernan Shipka, Bonnie Hunt, Nick Kroll, Kristofer Hivju, and Wesley Kimmel. The film tells the story of Head of North Pole Security Callum Drift, who teams up with black-hat hacker Jack O'Malley to locate a kidnapped Santa Claus on Christmas Eve. Principal photography for the film began in October 2022 and concluded in February 2023, with filming locations including Atlanta.

Red One was first released theatrically by Warner Bros. Pictures internationally on November 6, 2024, and in the United States by Amazon MGM Studios on November 15. The film received generally negative reviews from critics and was a box-office failure, grossing $186 million against a budget of $200–$250 million.

== Plot ==
Mythological Oversight and Restoration Authority (MORA) is a clandestine, multilateral, military organization that protects a secret peace treaty between humans and mythological creatures. Callum Drift, head of Santa Claus's security detail, plans to retire after one last Christmas run, having become disillusioned with people's increasingly toxic behavior, exemplified by the growth of Santa's Naughty List. On Christmas Eve, an unidentified black ops team breaks into the North Pole complex and kidnaps Santa, who is held by a mysterious woman in a vault that siphons his magic, rendering him unconscious.

MORA director Zoe Harlow's subordinates discover that Jack O'Malley, a freelance black-hat hacker, compromised Santa's location. Zoe apprehends Jack for questioning. Jack, a longtime Santa skeptic, explains that he had no idea what the information meant and merely sent it to an anonymous buyer. Zoe hires Jack to help find Santa and places a tracker on him, teaming a reluctant Callum with him. The mysterious woman and her sons duplicate the Glaskäfig (German for "glass cage"), planning to imprison all the people who have ever been on the Naughty List.

Jack and Callum track down Ted, the broker who bought the information on Santa's location, in Aruba. Ted reveals that the kidnapper is the winter witch Grýla. She sends her snowman henchmen to eliminate them. Although Callum and Jack are victorious, Ted is frozen before he can be questioned further.

Callum suspects that Grýla is working with Krampus, her ex-lover and Santa's estranged adoptive brother who created the Naughty List. Callum and Jack break into Krampus' lair, but are captured. Callum appeals to Krampus to help him find Santa Claus, who misses him, but Krampus refuses, and reveals that Grýla came to him to recover the Glaskäfig, a magical imprisoning snow globe. Jack steals back Callum's magic gauntlet and returns it to Callum, allowing the pair to escape.

Grýla successfully tests the snow globes by imprisoning Jack and his estranged son Dylan each inside of one. The two prisoners have a heartfelt conversation that by making them "nicer" causes the snow globes to break.

Following the implanted tracker, Zoe and Callum find Jack at the North Pole complex and realize that Grýla and her sons, along with Santa, have been inside the complex the entire time, having caused the search as a diversion. Zoe and Callum also discover that Grýla's team of shapeshifters has taken over the complex. Zoe and Callum find and free the imprisoned Mrs. Claus and other security staff. In Santa's old workshop, Zoe and Callum find Jack, Dylan, and the equipment that Grýla used to mass produce the Glaskäfigs.

As Grýla prepares to leave with an unconscious Santa, using his sleigh to distribute the Glaskäfigs, she is confronted by Callum, Jack, Zoe, and their allies, leading to a fight. Grýla launches the sleigh, but is intercepted by Callum and Jack, with assistance from Krampus, who arrives to help. Santa recovers, defeats Grýla with the help of the flying reindeer, and seals her inside a Glaskäfig. Santa and Krampus acknowledge each other and part ways peacefully, while Grýla is taken into Zoe's custody.

Before he leaves on his Christmas Eve run, Santa invites Jack and Dylan to accompany him. During the ride, Callum watches as Jack regains his sense of wonder and builds a relationship with Dylan. With his faith restored, Callum decides against retiring.

== Cast ==
- Dwayne Johnson as Callum Drift, head of North Pole security for Saint Nicholas and commander of the ELF (Enforcement, Logistics, and Fortification)
- Chris Evans as Jack "the Wolf" O'Malley, a black-hat hacker and bounty hunter
  - Wyatt Hunt as child Jack
- Lucy Liu as Zoe Harlow, the director of MORA
- Kiernan Shipka as Grýla, a Christmas witch who captures Santa Claus
  - Morla Gorrondona as the voice of Grýla's ogre form
- Bonnie Hunt as Mrs. Claus, the wife of Santa Claus
- Kristofer Hivju as Krampus, the brother of Santa Claus and the ex-boyfriend of Grýla
- Nick Kroll as Ted, a broker who bought the location of Santa Claus from Jack
- Wesley Kimmel as Dylan, Jack's son
- J. K. Simmons as Santa Claus, a legendary Christmas figure
- Reinaldo Faberlle as the voice of Agent Garcia, an anthropomorphic polar bear and ELF agent
- Mary Elizabeth Ellis as Olivia, Jack's ex-wife
- Marc Evan Jackson as Uncle Rick, the uncle of Jack
- Jenna Kanell as a guest of Krampus
- Gursharn Arya as Drako
- Jon Rudnitsky as Beef Stew, a social media influencer at the mall who Callum scolds for cutting in line to see Santa
- Regina Ting Chen as ELF Agent Ginerva
- James Cheek as ELF Welcoming Agent
- Reinaldo Faberlle as ELF Agent Garcia
- Philip Fornah as ELF Agent Fred
- Kenny Waymack Jr. as ELF Agent Kenny
- Gissette Valentin as ELF Agent Barskova
- Adam Boyer, Derek Russo, Michael Tourek, and Kia Shine as the Yule Lads, the children of Grýla
- Gabriel 'G-Rod' Rodriguez as the Yule Lad who impersonated Mrs. Claus
- Matthew Cornwell as:
  - Aaron Able, a man on the Naughty List who is Grýla's first target
  - Troll
- Jeff Chase as a horned Cyclops who works for Krampus
- Marti Matulis as The Slap Fight Judge

== Production ==
Hiram Garcia at Seven Bucks Productions conceived the idea for the film, which was developed into a screenplay by Chris Morgan for Jake Kasdan to direct and Dwayne Johnson to star for Amazon Studios. Chris Evans joined the cast in January 2022. In September 2022, Kiernan Shipka was added to the cast. Lucy Liu, Mary Elizabeth Ellis, J. K. Simmons, Nick Kroll, Kristofer Hivju, Wesley Kimmel, and Bonnie Hunt joined the cast the following month, with Ellis revealing Simmons and her involvement on Instagram. Dwayne Johnson was paid $50 million for his involvement. Principal photography began in October 2022 in Atlanta and wrapped in February 2023. Filming ran into issues with Johnson, who was typically seven to eight hours late to film his scenes and missed several days of shooting. These delays reportedly increased the budget by $50 million to a total of $250 million, which Garcia disputed. Johnson later admitted to frequent tardiness, as well as urinating in bottles on set, but Evans and Kasdan defended him.

== Release ==
Red One was originally scheduled to be released exclusively on Prime Video worldwide in time for Christmas 2023. On December 20, 2023, the film switched to a worldwide theatrical release on November 15, 2024, due to the 2023 SAG-AFTRA strike. Johnson pushed for Red One to be released in IMAX after watching an IMAX screening of Oppenheimer while Red One's principal photography was still underway. Johnson thought that Red One in the IMAX format would be "game over". Amazon MGM Studios handled the distribution in the United States, while Warner Bros. Pictures handled the film's international release. In the United Kingdom and Ireland, it was released on November 6, 2024. In Latin America, it was released on November 7, 2024. with prerelease advance screenings starting October 31, 2024. Footage of Red One was first shown at CinemaCon in April 2024 to journalists selected by Johnson's publicist, but they were not allowed to write about what they saw. Red One was released on Prime Video on December 12, 2024, and later on DVD, Blu-ray and Ultra HD Blu-ray by Amazon MGM via Warner Bros. Home Entertainment on March 4, 2025.

== Reception ==
=== Box office ===
Red One grossed $97 million in the United States and Canada, and $89 million in other territories, for a worldwide total of $186 million.

In the United States and Canada, Red One was projected to gross $30–35 million from 4,032 theaters, with some independent sources predicting a debut as low as $25 million or as high as $40 million. The film made $10.9 million on its first day, including $3.7 million from Sunday- and Thursday-night previews. It went on to debut to $32.1 million, topping the box office. Following the film's weak previews performance, Variety concluded, "With a massive budget of $250 million, plus marketing costs, it'll take a Christmas miracle for Red One to become a profitable hit at the box office." In its second box-office weekend, the film dropped 59% to $13.3 million, finishing in third behind newcomers Wicked and Gladiator II. In its third weekend, the film made $12.9 million (and a total of $18.7 million over the five-day Thanksgiving frame), dropping just 2.5% from the previous weekend and finishing in fourth behind Gladiator II, Wicked, and Moana 2.

=== Viewership ===
During its first four days (December 12–15) on Prime Video, Red One received 50 million views worldwide, surpassing Road House (which pulled in 50 million views after two weekends) as the most viewed Amazon MGM Studios film debut on Prime Video. According to Nielsen charts, Red One was viewed for 2.1 billion minutes in the United States during the week of December 9–15, ahead of the 1.69 billion minutes that Netflix's own Christmas action film Carry-On received in the same timeframe. In Nielsen's most-streamed films of 2024 list, Red One ranked at number 10 with 5.57 billion viewing minutes, making it the only nonanimated film and the only 2024 release to make the list.

=== Critical response ===
On the review aggregator website Rotten Tomatoes, 30% of 186 critics' reviews are positive. The website's consensus reads: "Wrapped in slick packaging but wholly lacking in holiday magic, Red One is a ho-ho-hum action-adventure." Metacritic, which uses a weighted average, assigned the film a score of 34 out of 100, based on 35 critics, indicating "generally unfavorable" reviews. Audiences surveyed by CinemaScore gave the film a more positive rating, with an average grade of "A–" on an A+ to F scale, while those polled by PostTrak gave it a 78% overall positive score, with 57% saying they would definitely recommend it.

Peter Bradshaw, writing for The Guardian, gave the film one star out of five, describing it as "profoundly depressing and blandly sentimental" and concluding "this commercial and formulaic slice of content is a toy destined to be forgotten, not by Boxing Day, but mid-November." Jake Coyle of Associated Press stated that "Red One comes off a little like the holiday version of Cowboys and Aliens — enough so to make you nostalgic for leaner tales about folkloric figures starring Johnson, like The Tooth Fairy."

Glenn Garner of Deadline Hollywood said the film "blends genres for some family-friendly holiday fun with a generous dose of self-aware absurdity" and wrote: "Yes, it's cheesy, but this movie is best when it leans heavily into the cheese. If that makes your eyes roll, keep in mind this is a Christmas movie ultimately intended for kids who've made it all the way through the MCU on Disney+ twice and their parents now need a reprieve. There are still some jokes aimed at the cold-hearted adult who will inevitably be dragged along on the family cinema outing."

== See also ==
- List of Christmas films
- List of films about witchcraft
- Santa Claus in film
