= Wake Up Call (2014 TV series) =

- Also known as: Rock Wake Up Call!
- Genre: Reality television
- Created by: Dwayne "The Rock" Johnson; Dany Garcia; Craig Armstrong; Rick Ringbakk; Charles Wachter; Ben Silverman; Corie Henson
- Directed by: Timothy Baker
- Starring: Dwayne "The Rock" Johnson
- Theme music composer: Russell Spurlock
- Opening theme: "Wake Up" by Zac Clark
- Composers: Jungle Punks Music; Whatnot Industries; Vanacore Music Inc.
- Country of origin: United States
- Original language: English
- No. of seasons: 1
- No. of episodes: 8

Production
- Executive producers: Dwayne "The Rock" Johnson; Craig Armstrong; Rick Ringbakk; Charles Wachter; Ben Silverman; Christopher R. Grant; Corie Henson; Dany Garcia
- Editors: Jason Steinberg, Paul Wiesepape, Anthony Carbone, Tom Munden, Jason Dolder
- Running time: 60 minutes
- Production companies: Five X Five Media; Electus; Seven Bucks Productions

Original release
- Network: TNT
- Release: December 12, 2014 – January 30, 2015

Wake Up Call is an American reality television series hosted by Dwayne "The Rock" Johnson that premiered on December 12, 2014, and aired through January 30, 2015, on TNT.

== Premise ==
Opening introduction (narrated by Dwayne "The Rock" Johnson):

Life is anything but predictable. By the time I was 23 years old, I had multiple arrests. My family was evicted. My dream of being a pro football player was shattered. I had 7 bucks in my pocket. That's when I made a choice. I rebuilt myself, and I started over. This show is about real people picking themselves up and saying, "I can do better." The people I'll be helping—everyday Americans down on their luck. If you're willing to meet me halfway and challenge yourself…you've got the power to change your life. It's time to make a choice. It's time to take a stand. It's time for your wake up call.

== Episodes ==
| No. | Title | Original release date | U.S. viewers (millions) |
|---|---|---|---|
| 1 | "Terrell: Hits Keep Coming" | December 12, 2014 | 508,000 |
In the series premiere, Terrell, an 18-year-old high school drop out who has aspirations of becoming a mixed martial arts fighter in the UFC gets his wake up call from Dwayne "The Rock" Johnson. The Rock surprises him with a family intervention, meeting UFC president Dana White, training with former fighter-turned-nutritionist Mike Dolce, and a chance to get sponsored by American Top Team's young fighters program.
| 2 | "Javier: Football Coach Needs Coaching" | December 19, 2014 | 496,000 |
Javier, an overweight high school football coach who needs to improve his health for himself and his family gets his wake-up call from Dwayne "The Rock" Johnson who calls on Biggest Loser personal trainer Jillian Michaels to help him lose the weight.
| 3 | "Tedesco Family: Pizzeria Problems" | December 26, 2014 | 540,000 |
| 4 | "Alyssa: High School Dropout" | January 2, 2015 | 759,000 |
Dwayne "The Rock" Johnson and teen expert Josh Shipp must cut through the tension in this caustic mother-daughter relationship. But first they challenge young Alyssa with eye-opening realities that land the high-schooler in prison.
| 5 | "Kevin: 40-Year-Old Momma's B" | January 9, 2015 | 563,000 |
| 6 | "Mason Family: Dad Dreams of Rapping" | January 16, 2015 | 480,000 |
| 7 | "Wooten's Airboat Tours: Sinking Business" | January 23, 2015 | 571,000 |
| 8 | "Kenny Anderson: Former NBA Star at Crossroads" | January 30, 2015 | N/A |
