= Kirkwood Mall =

- Location: Bismarck, North Dakota, United States
- Coordinates: 46°47′52″N 100°47′05″W
- Opened: 1970
- Previous names: Kirkwood Plaza Shopping Mall
- Developer: Wachter Real Estate Trust
- Manager: CBL Properties
- Owner: CBL Properties
- Architect: Rauenhorst Corp.
- Num. of stores: 90
- Num. of anchor tenants: 6
- Floor area: 850,000 sq ft (79,000 m^{2})
- Floors: 1
- Parking: 4,200 spaces
- Public transit: Bis-Man Transit
- Website: shopkirkwoodmall.com

Kirkwood Mall (originally known as Kirkwood Plaza) is an enclosed regional shopping mall in the city of Bismarck, North Dakota. At 850,000 square feet, Kirkwood Mall is the second largest mall in North Dakota, boasting over 90 shops. Opened in 1970, it is also the largest shopping center in the city. The mall's anchor stores are I. Keating Furniture & Flooring, Ashley HomeStore, Scheels, JCPenney, Tilt Studio, and Target. The last vacant anchor store that was once Herberger's has since been converted into a Tilt Studio. Since Tilt Studio occupied the last vacant anchor space, the mall has reached 100% occupancy.

Named for Robert C. Kirkwood, then-chairman of the board of the F.W. Woolworth Company, one of the original anchor tenants: in his long career with the company (starting as a trainee in his native Provo, Utah in 1923), Kirkwood had served as a store manager in Bismarck from 1935-39 as he moved to whatever city the company needed; he became company president in 1958, and CEO & Chairman of the Board in 1964. At the time the mall was built, Woolworths was the largest variety store chain in the world with more than 4,250 stores; the Kirkwood Mall store was the largest at the time it was announced.

== History ==
The Wachter family (Wachter Real Estate Trust) built the Kirkwood Plaza shopping center and it opened in 1970. The first manager of the mall was Eddo Carlson. Mr. Carlson managed the shopping center until the Wachter family sold it in 1984 for a reported $40 million. Original Kirkwood Plaza anchors were Montgomery Ward, F.W. Woolworth Company, and Herberger's. The mall was initially built in the shape of a "Y", with Herberger's being the south end, or bottom, of the Y. However, the mall has seen several expansions and changes over the years. A new south wing anchored by a Target store and a J. C. Penney store was added approximately ten years after the mall opened. Also, Herberger's significantly expanded its Kirkwood store after closing its Gateway Mall location on the north side of Bismarck.

Over the years Kirkwood Mall has seen a few changes with its anchors. After Woolworth closed in 1985, it became Dayton's. Then, in 2001, it became Marshall Field's after the merger of the Target Corporation's largest department stores into the one name. The store was closed in 2005 after Target sold their Marshall Fields stores to May Company and May Company sold the location back to the Target Corporation. The former Dayton's / Marshall Field's store was then demolished and the mall's Target store moved to that location and opened in the fall of 2006. Scheels All Sports then moved from its previous space east of Target into the former Target space after renovation was completed.

Originally Kirkwood Mall also had a Montgomery Ward store. Following that store's decline the space was taken over by I. Keating Furniture of Minot, North Dakota in 2003.

In December 2012, CBL & Associates, a Chattanooga, Tennessee-based REIT, announced plans to purchase the mall within 90 days. In early 2013, the Scheels All Sports started an expansion project that would take up most of the original space. Victoria's Secret also underwent an expansion during the summer of 2013

On April 18, 2018, it was announced that Herberger's would be closing as parent company The Bon-Ton Stores was going out of business. The store closed in August 2018. In spring 2020, it was announced that the space was to be renovated in a new wing featuring Chick-fil-A, Five Guys and Blaze Pizza with some room left over for future retail. However this was instead moved to the nearby parking lot and the old Herberger's building now hosts a new branch of the family arcade complex, Tilt Studios which opened in the building.

== Kirkwood today ==
Kirkwood Mall houses six major anchor stores including J. C. Penney, Target, Scheels, Ashley HomeStore, Tilt Studio, and I. Keating Furniture. The TJ Maxx has since relocated to the new Pinehurst Square Shopping Center, and in its place is North Dakota's first Gold's Gym. Kirkwood Mall is also home to over 90 smaller stores and a handful of restaurants.

CVS/pharmacy, an original tenant (as Osco Drug), vacated the mall in late January 2010 after completing its new store directly northwest of the mall.

Barnes & Noble opened a temporary store location in March 2022 after the closure of their nearby Southridge Center location. The store is opposite the H&M and across from Scheels. The company planned to move to a permanent location in 2023, however the mall location was successful enough to remain permanently.
