= Theater of War (film) =

Theater of War is a 2008 American documentary film directed by John Walter. The film uses the rehearsal process of a play production as a lens through which to investigate German playwright Bertolt Brecht's ideas on theater, politics, and war. The chosen production is a 2006 staging of Mother Courage and Her Children staged by The Public Theater in New York's Central Park, the production starred Meryl Streep and Kevin Kline, and was directed by George C. Wolfe.

Theater of War premiered at the 2008 Tribeca Film Festival, and went on to show in the same year at the Rome Film Festival, Provincetown International Film Festival, Silverdocs, Seattle International Film Festival, and Traverse City Film Festival. The film is distributed on DVD by Alive Mind in North America. It has screened at art house theaters around the United States, including a run at New York's Film Forum, where Ronnie Scheib of Variety and Manohla Dargis of The New York Times gave it positive reviews.
