= Rock and a Hard Place (film) =

2017 documentary film

- Poster for the film
- Genre: Documentary
- Directed by: Matthew O'Neill; Jon Alpert
- Music by: Paper Tiger
- Country of origin: United States
- Original language: English
- No. of episodes: 1

Production
- Producer: Susan Carney
- Cinematography: Jon Alpert; Matthew O'Neill
- Editor: David Meneses
- Running time: 81 minutes
- Production companies: 44 Blue Productions; Downtown Community Television Center

Original release
- Network: HBO
- Release: March 27, 2017

Rock and a Hard Place is a documentary film produced by and featuring Dwayne Johnson about youth prison boot camps in Miami, Florida that premiered on HBO in March 2017. It was directed and co-produced by Oscar-nominated filmmakers Jon Alpert and Matthew O'Neill.
