= Skyscraper (2018 film) =

Film by Rawson Marshall Thurber

- Theatrical release poster
- Directed by: Rawson Marshall Thurber
- Written by: Rawson Marshall Thurber
- Produced by: Beau Flynn; Dwayne Johnson; Hiram Garcia; Rawson Marshall Thurber
- Starring: Dwayne Johnson; Neve Campbell; Chin Han; Roland Møller; Noah Taylor; Byron Mann; Pablo Schreiber; Hannah Quinlivan
- Cinematography: Robert Elswit
- Edited by: Mike Sale; Julian Clarke
- Music by: Steve Jablonsky
- Production companies: Legendary Pictures; Flynn Picture Company; Seven Bucks Productions
- Distributed by: Universal Pictures
- Release dates: July 20, 2018 (Beijing); July 13, 2018 (US)
- Running time: 102 minutes
- Country: United States
- Languages: English; Cantonese
- Budget: $125–129 million
- Box office: $304.9 million

Skyscraper is a 2018 American action thriller film starring Dwayne Johnson as a former FBI agent who must rescue his family from a newly built Hong Kong skyscraper, the tallest in the world, after terrorists set the building on fire in an attempt to extort the property developer. Written, produced, and directed by Rawson Marshall Thurber, it co-stars Neve Campbell, Chin Han, Roland Møller, Noah Taylor, Byron Mann, Pablo Schreiber, and Hannah Quinlivan.

The film is the second collaboration between Thurber and Johnson, following Central Intelligence (2016). Development started in May 2016 when Legendary Entertainment won the bidding war for a Chinese-set action adventure film. Johnson was cast to play the lead, while Thurber was attached as the film's scriptwriter, director and producer, with Flynn producing the film through his Flynn Picture Company, alongside Johnson's Seven Bucks Productions and Universal Pictures handling distribution rights. Filming began in August 2017 in Vancouver, with location shooting in Hong Kong.

Skyscraper premiered in Beijing on July 2, 2018, and was released in the United States on July 13. It grossed $304 million against a budget of $125 million. The film received mixed reviews from critics, who praised Johnson's performance and the film's suspenseful scenes, but criticized the story and deemed it too similar to other films, including The Towering Inferno (1974) and Die Hard (1988).

== Plot ==
Will Sawyer, a Marine veteran turned Federal Bureau of Investigation's Hostage Rescue Team (HRT) leader, loses his left leg below the knee when he and HRT colleague Ben Gillespie encounter a hostage taker with a suicide bomb. Ten years later, Will, now a private security consultant, is recommended by Ben to review security for "The Pearl", a 3,500 feet (1,100 m) skyscraper located in Hong Kong that comprises 225 floors and is the tallest in the world. His wife Sarah (the naval doctor who treated him 10 years prior) and twin children Henry and Georgia stay with him on the not-yet-opened residential floors. Meeting with Ben, the Pearl's owner Zhao Long Ji, security director Okeke, and head insurance underwriter Pierce, Will reported that the computerized fire and security systems have passed his tests, though he needs to inspect the offsite security center.

Zhao provides Will with a tablet that gives him complete control over the Pearl's systems, accessible only to his biometric credentials. Will and Ben head to the offsite facility, but a mugger hired by international terrorist Kores Botha attempts to steal the tablet. Ben betrays and attacks Will for the tablet, resulting in Will killing Ben. Botha and a group of his men break into the Pearl and undermine the safety systems by using a water-reactive chemical to start a fire on the 96th floor, creating a barrier that renders it impossible to enter or exit from the upper 130 floors.

Will tries to return to the Pearl, but is attacked by Xia, one of Botha's associates. Xia and her agents take the tablet, kill everyone at the offsite facility, and use the tablet to disable the fire-extinguishing systems in the Pearl and activate the air vents, spreading the fire to the upper floors. Zhao and Okeke send security guards to rescue Will's family, but the guards are killed in an explosion and the family is believed dead. Urged on by Pierce, Zhao orders the remaining personnel to evacuate by helicopter. Pierce, another of Botha's accomplices, kills all of them as Zhao escapes into his penthouse apartment and locks it down from any intrusion. Hong Kong Police Force Inspector Wu and his team attempt to secure the Pearl and capture Will, who is framed for the incidents. Will evades them and makes his way into the Pearl above the fire barrier using a crane from an adjacent building. He kills Pierce before Pierce can kill his family, though Georgia is separated from the others.

Will has Sarah and Henry ride through the fire barrier in a free-fall elevator before applying the emergency brakes, letting them escape safely; Sarah immediately explains the situation to Wu and deduces that Botha's men will likely escape via parachute to a nearby landing zone (having encountered them earlier, on the 96th floor, before the fire, and seen them carry equipment with a parachute brand label on). Will finds Georgia, but they are captured by Botha, who demands Zhao in return for Georgia. Will is forced to dangerously scale the outside of the building to access the security panel for Zhao's penthouse, then enters and confronts him. Zhao explains that Botha had extorted money from him during the $6 billion construction project by threatening to cripple his workforce, but he kept a detailed computer file of the transactions as insurance, which can reveal accounts and names of three crime syndicates Botha works for, so Botha instigated the attack to obtain the records since his employers threaten to kill him.

Will brings Zhao to Botha at the top of the Pearl, acquiescing to the trade for Georgia. However, Zhao distracts Botha, allowing himself and Will to kill Botha's thugs. Botha grabs Georgia and threatens to drop her off the building, but Will outsmarts him, rescues Georgia, and leaves Botha to die in a grenade explosion as he falls. Wu leads an attack on the drop zone, securing Xia after Sarah subdues her and killing her thugs. Sarah recovers the tablet and uses it to restart the Pearl's systems, extinguishing the blaze. Will, Georgia, and Zhao are brought down safely by helicopter, during which Zhao states his intention to rebuild the Pearl, shown to have massive fire damage extending from the 96th floor to the roof. The Sawyer family then happily reunites while Wu acknowledges and finally meets and greets Will.

== Cast ==
- Dwayne Johnson as Will Sawyer, a former US Marine, FBI Hostage Rescue Team leader and amputee, who now assesses security for skyscrapers.
- Neve Campbell as Sarah Sawyer, Will's wife, a former US Navy doctor.
- Chin Han as Zhao Long Ji, a wealthy Chinese tech entrepreneur and financier of the Pearl.
- Roland Møller as Kores Botha, a Danish terrorist kingpin who plans to control the Pearl skyscraper by starting a fire in random places so he will withdraw millions of dollars in shakedown payments.
- Noah Taylor as Mr. Pierce, a corrupt insurance executive, secretly working for Botha.
- Byron Mann as Inspector Wu, head of the Hong Kong Police Force (HKPF) response team.
- Hannah Quinlivan as Xia, Botha's henchwoman.
- Pablo Schreiber as Ben Gillespie, Will's former colleague and friend who secretly works for Botha.
- McKenna Roberts as Georgia Sawyer, Will and Sarah's daughter and Henry's twin sister.
- Noah Cottrell as Henry Sawyer, Will and Sarah's son and Georgia's twin brother.
- Elfina Luk as Sergeant Han, a member of the HKPF.
- Adrian Holmes as Ajani Okeke, Zhao's head of security and personal bodyguard.
- Matt O'Leary as the Skinny Hacker, Botha's computer expert.
- Tzi Ma as Chief Sheng, Hong Kong Fire Services.
- Kevin Rankin as Ray, the father who holds his family hostage in the film's opening.

== Production ==
=== Development ===
On May 26, 2016, it was announced that Legendary Entertainment had won the bidding war for a Chinese-set action adventure film, Skyscraper, in which Dwayne Johnson was set to play the lead. Rawson Marshall Thurber was attached as the film's scriptwriter, director and producer, with Beau Flynn producing the film through his Flynn Picture Company, alongside Johnson's Seven Bucks Productions, with Universal Pictures handling distribution rights. On June 22, 2017, it was reported that Neve Campbell had signed on to play the wife of Johnson's character, a role where Maggie Q, Rachel Bilson, Jaimie Alexander and Mira Sorvino were also considered. In July 2017, Chin Han and Pablo Schreiber joined the cast. In August 2017, Byron Mann, Hannah Quinlivan, Noah Taylor, and Roland Møller were added to the cast.

Adrian Smith + Gordon Gill Architecture consulted the film production on the design of the fictitious 225-story megatall skyscraper, with Adrian Smith quoted as saying that "the producer wanted this to be a tower based on real possibilities". Smith advised "on issues that tall buildings face in real life and design aspects like wind behaviour, tower movement, elevator systems and how supertall towers can become cities within the tower". The architectural rendering of the skyscraper was based on Chinese inspirations, particularly a twisting dragon with a pearl in its mouth. According to the New York Post, "production designer Jim Bissell and his team researched local myths for inspiration and came upon a Chinese fable they could work with." The skyscraper is located where the real-life Hong Kong Cultural Centre is situated.

=== Filming ===
Principal photography on the film began on August 14, 2017, in Vancouver, British Columbia. Additional location shooting took place on-location in Hong Kong, including at the Cultural Centre.

=== Visual effects ===
During post-production, the visual effects were provided by Moving Picture Company, Method Studios, Image Engine and Industrial Light & Magic (ILM); the visuals were supervised by Craig Hammack, Jose Burgos, Bernhard Kimbacher and Jason Billington.

== Music ==
Steve Jablonsky composed the film's score, which uses elements of guitars, synthesized drums, and traditional orchestra. The soundtrack was digitally released on July 13, 2018, by Milan Records, with the physical soundtrack being released later on August 3, 2018. British singer and songwriter Jamie N Commons performed the song "Walls" which plays in the end credits of the film.

== Release ==
=== Marketing ===
Universal released the first official trailer in February 2018 and the second trailer on May 23, 2018. Promo posters in the form of The Towering Inferno (1974) and Die Hard (1988) were created, referencing the stylistic links between those films and Skyscraper.

=== Theatrical ===
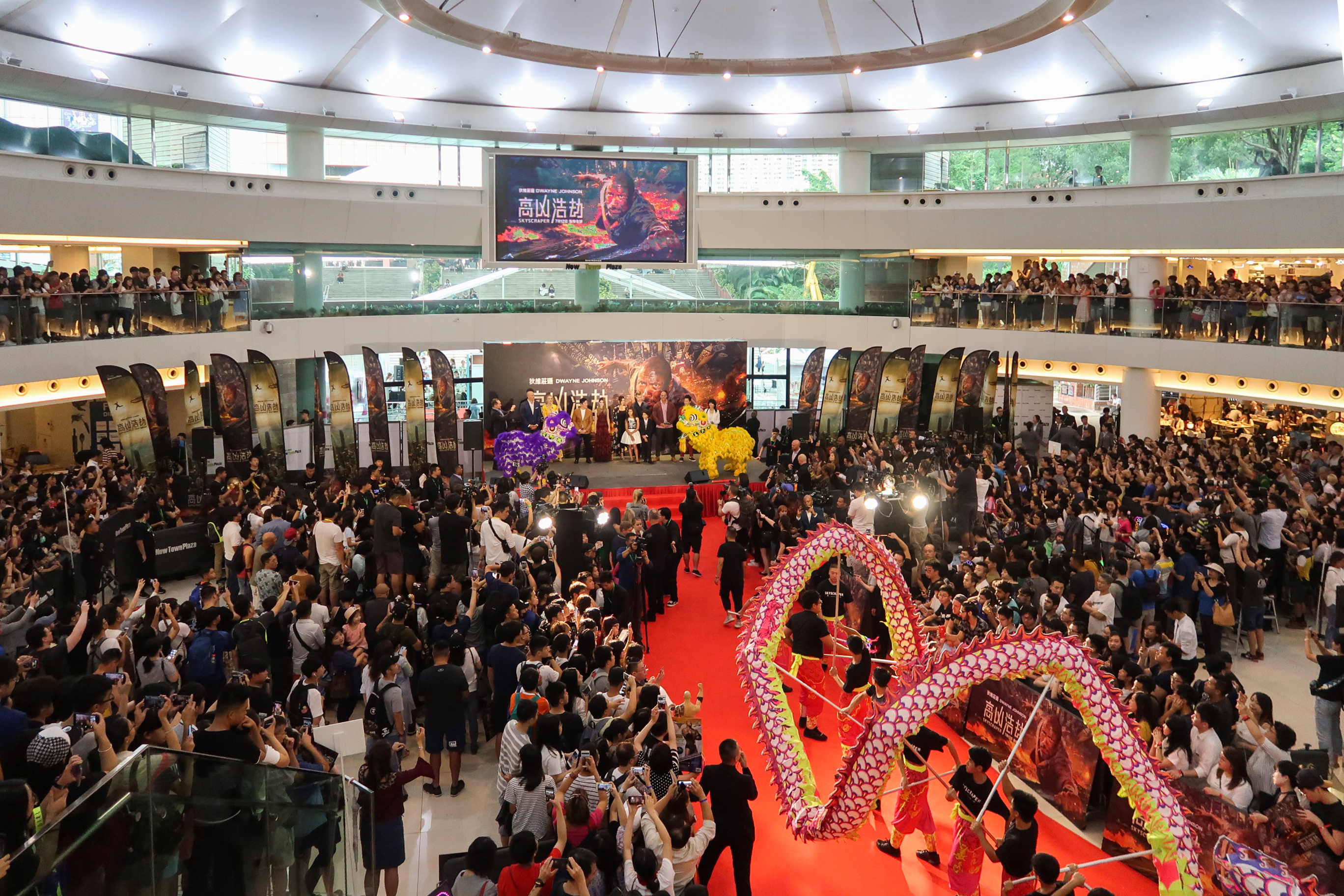
A Skyscraper screening at New Town Plaza in Hong Kong on July 7, 2018.

Skyscraper was released in the United States on July 13, 2018, by Universal Pictures. The film also secured a July 20, 2018, release date in China, a rarity as mainstream Hollywood films are seldom released there during the month of July, to make room for domestic films. Skyscraper premiered in Beijing, on July 2, 2018, and also held a screening in Hong Kong on July 7, 2018.

=== Home media ===
Skyscraper was released digitally on September 25, 2018, and released on Blu-ray, DVD, Blu-ray 3D and Ultra HD Blu-ray on October 2, 2018, by Universal Pictures Home Entertainment.

== Reception ==
=== Box office ===
Skyscraper grossed $68.4 million in the United States and Canada and $236.4 million in other territories for a total worldwide gross of $304.9 million against a production budget of $125 million.

In the United States and Canada, Skyscraper was released alongside the opening of Hotel Transylvania 3: Summer Vacation, as well as the wide expansion of Sorry to Bother You, and was initially projected to gross $32–40 million from 3,782 theaters in its opening weekend. However, after making $1.95 million during Thursday night screenings (down from the $2.4 million made by Johnson's Rampage the past April) and $9.3 million on its first day, weekend estimates were lowered to $24 million. The film ended up debuting at $24.9 million, finishing third, behind Hotel Transylvania 3: Summer Vacation and Ant-Man and the Wasp. Deadline Hollywood attributed the low figure to audiences having seen the plot before in other films and the July release date being at the height of the crowded summer movie season, as well as the possibility that filmgoers had become tired of seeing Johnson so frequently (although the site noted that 72% of people who bought tickets to Skyscraper did so because of him). In its second weekend, the film made $11.4 million and finished sixth, and in its third, made $5.4 million, finishing ninth.

The film debuted at $47.7 million in China, finishing first at the country's box office and bringing the two-week global foreign total to $132.8 million. In its third weekend of international release, the film added another $17.8 million, including $7 million in China (for a running-cume of $86 million).

Skyscraper concluded 2018 as the 31st-highest-grossing film of the year worldwide.

=== Critical reception ===
On the review aggregator website Rotten Tomatoes, 48% of 293 critics' reviews are positive, with an average rating of 5.20/10. The website's consensus reads: "Well-cast yet derivative, Skyscraper isn't exactly a towering action thriller feat, but it's solidly constructed enough to stand among the genre's more mildly diverting features." On Metacritic, which assigns a weighted average rating to reviews, the film has a score of 51 out of 100, based on 42 critics, indicating "mixed or average reviews". Audiences polled by CinemaScore gave the film an average grade of "B+" on an A+ to F scale.

Alonso Duralde of TheWrap called the film a "satisfying summer thriller," while acknowledging the familiar plot, and writing, "Skyscraper doesn't change the action-movie game the way Die Hard did, but it's a solidly entertaining summer diversion best enjoyed on the biggest theater — or even better, drive-in — screen you can find." Variety's Peter Debruge was more critical of the story but praised Johnson, saying, "This is escapism, pure and simple, and though the structure is rickety, by enlisting Johnson, Thurber ensures that his Skyscraper is built on solid Rock."

Writing for Entertainment Weekly, Chris Nashawaty found the film to be a weak clone of Die Hard, giving it a "C−" rating and stating: "It's all passively watchable, but the main problem is that writer-director Rawson Marshall Thurber (Central Intelligence) hasn't come up with a villain nearly as memorable as Alan Rickman's Hans Gruber. I know that comparison may seem unfair, but when you're ripping off Die Hard this shamelessly, it's kind of not."

=== Accolades ===
Skyscraper won Best Summer Blockbuster Poster at the 2018 Golden Trailer Awards. At the 45th Saturn Awards, the film was nominated for Best Action or Adventure Film. Johnson received both nominations for Favorite Movie Actor and Favorite Butt-Kicker at the 2019 Kids' Choice Awards.

== See also ==
- The Towering Inferno
- Die Hard
- The Tower
