= Charles Wachter =

Gottlieb Charles Wachter (1865–1928), commonly known by his middle name, was a German-born businessman and city commissioner in Bismarck, North Dakota, United States. Wachter is best remembered as the patriarch of one of the earliest and most prominent families of North Dakota's capital city.

== Biography ==
=== Early years ===
Gottlieb Charles Wachter, commonly known by his first initials or middle name, was born in the town of Bernstein, near Stuttgart, Kingdom of Württemberg in 1865.

Wachter emigrated from Germany to the United States circa 1880, as a teenaged boy. For nearly a year previously Wachter had worked as a meat cutter in Philadelphia before settling in the area of Bismarck in the Dakota Territory in 1881, where he continued to work as a meat cutter until he had saved enough money to start his own company in 1885, the Wachter Dray and Transfer Company.

=== Business career ===
This would prove to be the first of many family owned business enterprises in Bismarck bearing the Wachter name. Wachter's one-man dray operation burgeoned into a substantial corporate enterprise with more than 50 teams of horses and the farmland needed to support them, cutting and delivering ice from the Missouri River, hauling and selling coal and wood for heating, and providing excavation work and warehouse space.

On April 27, 1892, Gottlieb Charles Wachter married Annie Clotier Robidou (1866-1941). The couple had three children, named Emma Louise, Eugene Charles, and Paul August Wachter.

Wachter turned his sundry businesses over to his sons in July 1923.

Gottlieb Charles Wachter, patriarch of this branch of Wachters, served on the local school board, where he was influential in providing for an elementary school on the south side of Bismarck. In 1918 the city memorialized Wachter by naming this elementary school in his honor.

Wachter also served on the city commission from 1925 until his death in 1928.

=== Death and legacy ===
Gottlieb Charles Wachter died in March 1928. He was 62 years old.

Following the death of their father, Eugene (d. 1960) and Paul August (d. 1961) took over the family businesses, with Eugene managing the Wachter Ranch and Paul overseeing the other various business enterprises in and around Bismarck. In 1929, the family created Wachter's, Incorporated to manage the growing business empire. This meant looking ahead to development on the south side of the city, an area plagued at times by flooding from the Missouri River.

In 1936 the Wachter-O'Neil construction company was involved in building a dam at the Fresno site in Montana, part of a series of projects along the Milk River. This was followed by Wachter's involvement building the Fort Peck Dam, which allowed them to see ahead to the impacts the Garrison Dam would have on Bismarck. The completion of the Garrison Dam changed the flow of the Missouri River, capturing much of the water in Lake Sakakawea and Lake Oahe. The Garrison Dam was completed in 1953, freeing up floodplain land that the Wachter family had invested in for development beyond farming.

Farming and ranching were still significant enterprises. At one time the Wachter Ranch contained 28,800 acres in Morton and Oliver Counties and was the largest deeded ranch in North Dakota.

The Wachter family ran Dakota Sand and Gravel and operated a Mayflower moving company franchise. As automobiles became the norm, the family purchased and ran Missouri Valley Motors for a time.

Other businesses operated by the heirs of Charles Wachter included Kirkwood Motor Inn, Kirkwood Plaza shopping center, the Bank of Kirkwood Plaza, House of Bottles, Towne and Country Liquor, and Towne and Country Real Estate.

The most influential member of the third generation of the Wachter family was Paul H. Wachter (d. 1973), son of Paul August. This younger Wachter was well known for his business enterprises and land developments in the Bismarck area. Over the years he served as managing director for the Kirkwood Plaza Shopping Center (now Kirkwood Mall), Wachter Real Estate Trust, Wachter's, Inc., Dakota Sand and Gravel and other enterprises.

Besides being a businessman, Paul H. Wachter was an inventor and a philanthropist. He is also remembered for his patents for a spatula and a device to keep rainwater from getting into the engines of tractors.

The Wachter family is well known for its donations of land to the city of Bismarck. Some of their most notable donations include space for parking lots south of the Bismarck Civic Center, land for the Wachter Aquatic Center and Schaumberg Ice Arena, and part of the land for Wachter Junior High School and Dorothy Moses School.

Besides their commercial enterprises, the Wachter family was helpful in developing several residential areas in Bismarck. Some of their developments include areas south of Lincoln, Cottonwood Lake Estates, and River Place First Addition in Mandan.
