= Rawson Marshall Thurber =

American film director (born 1975)

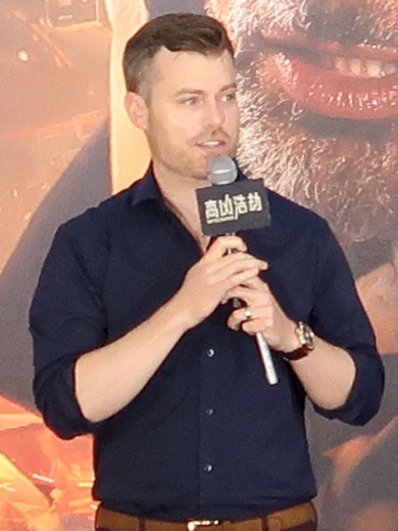
- Thurber at the Hong Kong premiere of Skyscraper in 2018
- Born: February 9, 1975 (age 51); San Francisco, California, U.S.
- Occupations: Filmmaker; actor
- Years active: 1997–present
- Notable work: Dodgeball: A True Underdog Story; We're the Millers; Central Intelligence; Skyscraper; Red Notice
- Height: 6’1
- Spouse: Sarah Koplin
- Children: 3

Rawson Marshall Thurber (born February 9, 1975) is an American filmmaker and actor. He is best known for writing and directing the 2004 comedy film Dodgeball: A True Underdog Story. He also formed a production company Bad Version Productions.

== Early life ==
Thurber was born in San Francisco, California. He is the son of attorney Marshall Thurber.

He is a 1997 graduate of Union College (Schenectady, New York), where he was a member of the Delta Upsilon fraternity and played wide receiver on the football team for two years. He is also a graduate of the Peter Stark Producing Program at USC.

== Career ==
Thurber worked as an assistant to screenwriter John August, beginning with the television show D.C. In 2002, he wrote and directed the original Terry Tate: Office Linebacker commercials for Reebok.

In 2004, he wrote and directed the critically and commercially successful sports comedy film Dodgeball: A True Underdog Story.

He wrote and directed the film adaptation of Michael Chabon's novel The Mysteries of Pittsburgh, released in 2008.

He directed the 2013 We're the Millers, starring Jason Sudeikis and Jennifer Aniston. In June 2014, he was rumored to replace Edgar Wright to direct Marvel's Ant-Man, but later turned the job down.

He wrote and directed 2016's action-comedy Central Intelligence with Dwayne Johnson and Kevin Hart.

Thurber wrote and directed the 2018 action film Skyscraper from Legendary Pictures, reteaming with Dwayne Johnson and released by Universal. He next wrote and directed Legendary's $150 million budget action comedy Red Notice (2021), starring Ryan Reynolds, Gal Gadot and Johnson. It is the third time he has collaborated with the latter. The project was released by Netflix.

In 2021, Ubisoft announced Thurber would direct the film adaptation of its game series The Division, starring Jake Gyllenhaal and Jessica Chastain. The film will be released on Netflix.

In 2022, eOne announced that Thurber will be writing and producing the pilot for upcoming TV series Dungeons & Dragons. He also signed on to direct a live-action film based on the Voltron franchise.

In 2023 and 2024, he was planning to do a Dodgeball sequel. He also hired Clay Tarver to write the film's screenplay. Ten years on from that development, Jordan VanDina will now write the movie's script.

== Filmography ==
=== Film ===
Short film

Year	Title	Director	Writer
2000	Terry Tate: Office Linebacker	Yes	Yes
2008	Manchild	Yes	No
2017	Play Dodgeball with Ben Stiller	Yes	Yes

Feature film

Year	Title	Director	Writer	Producer
2004	Dodgeball: A True Underdog Story	Yes	Yes	No
2008	The Mysteries of Pittsburgh	Yes	Yes	Yes
2013	We're the Millers	Yes	No	No
2016	Central Intelligence	Yes	Yes	No
2018	Skyscraper	Yes	Yes	Yes
2021	Red Notice	Yes	Yes	Yes
2027	Voltron	Yes	Yes	Yes

Acting credits

Year	Title	Role
2004	Dodgeball: A True Underdog Story	Obnoxious Las Vegas Homophobe
2007	The Nines	Game Night Guest
2010	Easy A	Quiznos Guy
2013	We're the Millers	The Ultimate Border Guard
2015	The Wedding Ringer	Cop
2016	Central Intelligence	Handsome Pants-Catcher
2022	Chip 'n Dale: Rescue Rangers	Voltron Vendor

=== Television ===
Year	Title	Director	Writer	Executive Producer	Creator	Notes
2006	The Loop	Yes	No	No	No	Episode "Trouble In The Saddle"
2015	Marry Me	Yes	No	No	No	Episode "Date Me"
2017–2019	Ryan Hansen Solves Crimes on Television	Yes	Yes	Yes	Yes	Directed 4 episodes
