= List of film adaptations of Disney attractions =

This is a list of films and television series produced by The Walt Disney Company based on or suggested by Disney Parks attractions. They are distributed by Walt Disney Pictures unless otherwise noted. The list also includes any relevant sequels, spin-offs, and remakes.

== Feature films ==
=== Released ===
Film	Attraction	Release date	Director(s)	Screenwriter(s)	Producer(s)	Ref.
Tower of Terror (Note: Television film distributed by Walt Disney Television.)	The Twilight Zone Tower of Terror	October 26, 1997	D. J. MacHale	D. J. MacHale	Iain Paterson	
Mission to Mars (Note: Distributed by Touchstone Pictures.)	Mission to Mars	March 10, 2000	Brian De Palma	Jim Thomas, John Thomas and Graham Yost	Tom Jacobson	
The Country Bears	Country Bear Jamboree	July 26, 2002	Peter Hastings	Mark Perez	Andrew Gunn and Jeffrey Chernov	
Pirates of the Caribbean: The Curse of the Black Pearl	Pirates of the Caribbean	July 9, 2003	Gore Verbinski	Ted Elliott and Terry Rossio	Jerry Bruckheimer	
The Haunted Mansion	The Haunted Mansion	November 26, 2003	Rob Minkoff	David Berenbaum	Andrew Gunn and Don Hahn	
Pirates of the Caribbean: Dead Man's Chest	Pirates of the Caribbean	July 7, 2006	Gore Verbinski	Ted Elliott and Terry Rossio	Jerry Bruckheimer	
Pirates of the Caribbean: At World's End	Pirates of the Caribbean	May 25, 2007	Gore Verbinski	Ted Elliott and Terry Rossio	Jerry Bruckheimer	
Pirates of the Caribbean: On Stranger Tides	Pirates of the Caribbean	May 20, 2011	Rob Marshall	Ted Elliott and Terry Rossio	Jerry Bruckheimer	
Tomorrowland (Note: Also known as Project T in some regions, and subtitled A World Beyond in some other regions.)	Tomorrowland	May 22, 2015	Brad Bird	Damon Lindelof and Brad Bird	Damon Lindelof, Brad Bird and Jeffrey Chernov	
Pirates of the Caribbean: Dead Men Tell No Tales (Note: Released in most countries as Pirates of the Caribbean: Salazar's Revenge.)	Pirates of the Caribbean	May 26, 2017	Joachim Rønning and Espen Sandberg	Jeff Nathanson	Jerry Bruckheimer	
Jungle Cruise (Note: Disney decided to release the film simultaneously on Disney+ with Premier Access in response to the COVID-19 pandemic.)	Jungle Cruise	July 30, 2021	Jaume Collet-Serra	Michael Green, Glenn Ficarra and John Requa	John Davis, John Fox, Beau Flynn, Dwayne Johnson, Dany Garcia and Hiram Garcia	
Haunted Mansion	The Haunted Mansion	July 28, 2023	Justin Simien	Katie Dippold	Dan Lin and Jonathan Eirich	

=== Upcoming ===
Film	Attraction	Release date	Director(s)	Screenwriter(s)	Producer(s)	Ref.
Tower of Terror	The Twilight Zone Tower of Terror	TBA	TBA	Josh Cooley	Scarlett Johansson, Jonathan Lia	

== Television series ==
Television series	Attraction	Release date	Ref.
It's a Small World: The Animated Series	It's a Small World	November 26, 2013 – February 4, 2014	
Miles from Tomorrowland	Tomorrowland	February 6, 2015 – September 10, 2018	

=== Upcoming ===
Television series	Attraction	Release date	Ref.
Spaceship Earth	Spaceship Earth	TBA	
Duffy and Friends	Duffy the Disney Bear	TBA	

== Television specials ==
Television special	Attraction	Release date	Director(s)	Screenwriter(s)	Producer(s)	Ref.
Muppets Haunted Mansion (Note: Crossover with The Muppets.)	The Haunted Mansion	October 8, 2021 (Note: Streaming film distributed by Disney+.)	Kirk Thatcher	Kirk Thatcher, Kelly Younger and Bill Barretta	Chelsea DeVincent	

== Short films ==
Short film	Attraction	Release date	Director(s)	Ref.
Tales of the Code: Wedlocked	Pirates of the Caribbean	2011	James Ward Byrkit	

== Scrapped projects ==
In the 1970s, a planned feature film based on It's a Small World was going to be a Cold War-tinged comedy adventure where the children of UN leaders try to get their parents to stop squabbling through faking mass-kidnapping, only for a war profiteer to try to take advantage of the fear and start a mass conflict.

Splash Mountain Boys or Briar Patch Boys is an unspecified animated short/animated series starring the animal characters from Song of the South that was pitched in the early 2000s by Robert Taylor before being cancelled for unknown reasons. The existence of this project was revealed via a listing on icollector.com, an auction site. In the initial outline, the project starred Br'er Rabbit, Br'er Fox, Br'er Bear, and a new character named Baby Possum in a story that set out to tell the origin story behind Splash Mountain and why the area surrounding Chick-A-Pin Hill got flooded.

In 2010, Disney was in early negotiations to pick up "Tiki," a spec script from Ahmet Zappa and Michael Wilson that is set in the world of Walt Disney's Enchanted Tiki Room.

In 2011, Disney announced that it would make a movie based on the Matterhorn Bobsleds called The Hill, about five teenagers who go on a journey up the mountain and encounter a yeti. In 2021, the company announced that it would produce a film based on the attraction for their streaming service Disney+, with the working title Matterhorn.

In April 2014, it was announced that a feature film franchise about It's a Small World was in the works, to be directed by Jon Turteltaub, written by Jared Stern, and produced by Turteltaub, Stern, and Dan Lin. The project was still in development in early 2016, but no new information on the film has been released.

In July 2014, it was announced that Disney Television Animation was developing an animated special based on the Haunted Mansion, the project originally was going to be helm by Phineas and Ferb writers Joshua Prett and Scott D. Peterson with Gris Grimly as art director and executive producer, the project was later re-developed as a potential mini-series for Disney XD with Shannon Tindle as executive producer but executive changes at Disney Branded Television in 2017 shelved the production.

In October 2018, it was reported that Disney had been looking for ways to reboot the Pirates of the Caribbean franchise, bringing on Deadpool (2016) writers Rhett Reese and Paul Wernick, though producer Jerry Bruckheimer was expected to return. However, in February 2019, Reese and Wernick departed the project and the reboot was cancelled. In June 2020, a female-led spin-off starring Margot Robbie was announced, with Christina Hodson writing the screenplay. The film was to be separate from the sixth film also being developed. Bruckheimer was attached as producer. In November 2022, Robbie said the project was not going forward. In May 2024, Bruckheimer said that this project could still get made along with the reboot.

In October 2022, The Hollywood Reporter reported that a film based on Society of Explorers and Adventurers was in development with Qui Nguyen writing the screenplay and Ryan Reynolds producing.

Dreamfinders, a television show loosely based on Journey into Imagination, was supposed to be one of the first TV shows aired on the Disney Channel when it first launched back in 1983; the series would have focused on Dreamfinder and Figment teaming up with other residents of the Dream Port and some ordinary children to protect the realm of imagination from a villain called Fear and his minions (with said children being inspired by their experiences to come up with solutions to their ordinary problems). While scripts for episodes were written and on-set production footage exists from a Disney Channel launch preview, no episodes were ever completed according to the Walt Disney Archives Chief Archivist Emeritus Dave Smith, and no explanation was given as to why the project was cancelled.

== Reception ==
=== Box office performance ===
Film	U.S. release date	Box office gross			All-time ranking		Budget	Ref.
Film	U.S. release date	U.S. and Canada	Other territories	Worldwide	U.S. and Canada	Worldwide	Budget	Ref.
Tower of Terror	October 26, 1997	Television film						
Mission to Mars	March 10, 2000	$60,883,407	$50,100,000	$110,983,407	1,460	1,670	$100 million	
The Country Bears	July 26, 2002	$16,990,825	$1,021,272	$18,012,097	4,163	5,826	$35 million	
Pirates of the Caribbean: The Curse of the Black Pearl	July 9, 2003	$305,413,918	$348,850,097	$654,264,015	97	154	$140 million	
The Haunted Mansion	November 26, 2003	$75,847,266	$106,443,000	$182,290,266	1,119	1,200	$90 million	
Pirates of the Caribbean: Dead Man's Chest	July 7, 2006	$423,315,812	$642,863,935	$1,066,179,747	32	39	$225 million	
Pirates of the Caribbean: At World's End	May 25, 2007	$309,420,425	$651,576,067	$960,996,492	95	56	$300 million	
Pirates of the Caribbean: On Stranger Tides	May 20, 2011	$241,071,802	$804,642,000	$1,045,713,802	155	42	$250 million	
Tomorrowland	May 22, 2015	$93,436,322	$115,599,346	$209,035,668	865	864	$190 million	
Pirates of the Caribbean: Dead Men Tell No Tales	May 26, 2017	$172,558,876	$622,322,566	$794,881,442	315	100	$230 million	
Jungle Cruise (Note: Through its first 10 days of release, Samba reported the film had been streamed in 1.5 million households for a running domestic Premier Access gross of $44.98 million.)	July 30, 2021	$116,987,516	$103,241,648	$220,229,164	590	844	$200 million	
Haunted Mansion (2023)	July 28, 2023	$67,637,887	$49,386,305	$117,024,192	5,340	7,527	$150 million	
Total		$1,754,021,107	$3,371,048,283	$5,133,979,390	—N/a	—N/a	$1,660,000,000	—N/a

=== Critical and public response ===
Film	Rotten Tomatoes	Metacritic	CinemaScore
Tower of Terror	—N/a	—N/a	—N/a
Mission to Mars	24%	34	C-
The Country Bears	31%	—N/a	A-
Pirates of the Caribbean: The Curse of the Black Pearl	79%	63	A
The Haunted Mansion	14%	34	B
Pirates of the Caribbean: Dead Man's Chest	53%	53	A-
Pirates of the Caribbean: At World's End	44%	50	A-
Pirates of the Caribbean: On Stranger Tides	33%	45	B+
Tomorrowland	50%	60	B
Pirates of the Caribbean: Dead Men Tell No Tales	29%	39	A-
Jungle Cruise	63%	50	A-
Haunted Mansion (2023)	37%	47	B+

=== Academy Awards ===
Award	Film		
Award	Pirates of the Caribbean: The Curse of the Black Pearl	Pirates of the Caribbean: Dead Man's Chest	Pirates of the Caribbean: At World's End
Best Actor	Nominated (Johnny Depp)		
Best Art Direction		Nominated	
Best Makeup	Nominated		Nominated
Best Sound Editing	Nominated	Nominated	
Best Sound Mixing	Nominated	Nominated	
Best Visual Effects	Nominated	Won	Nominated

== See also ==
- List of remakes and adaptations of Disney animated films
- Behind the Attraction, a documentary television series on Disney+ about rides at Disney Parks across the world.
- One Day at Disney, a 2019 film followed by a television series in 2019.
