= One Day at Disney =

One Day at Disney may refer to:

- One Day at Disney (film) a documentary film
- One Day at Disney Shorts a documentary web television series
