= List of awards and nominations received by Sterling K. Brown =

Sterling K. Brown awards and nominations
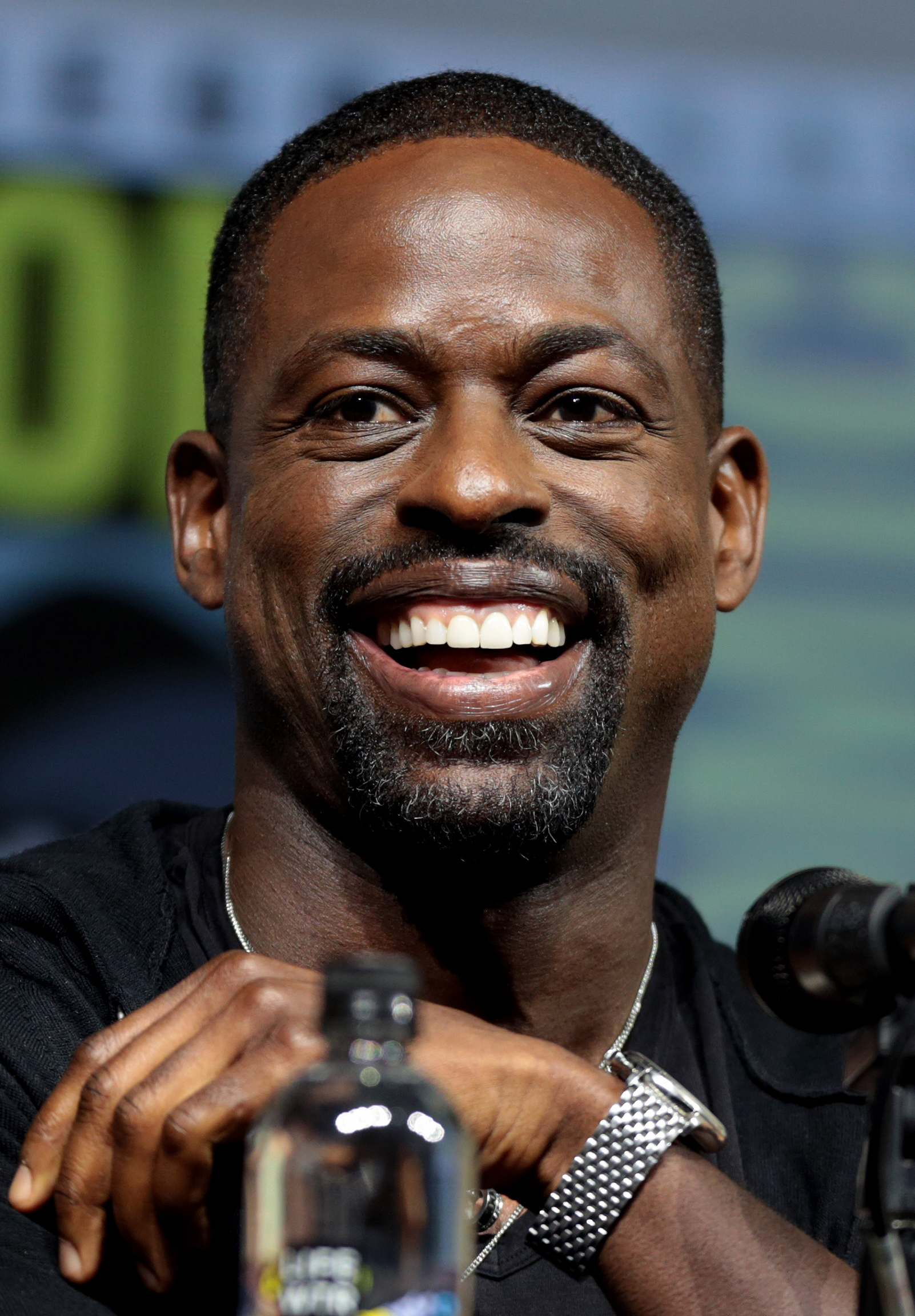
- Brown in 2018
Awards and nominations
Award	Wins	Nominations
Academy Awards	0	1
Black Reel Awards	5	13
Critics' Choice Movie Awards	0	1
Critics' Choice Television Awards	2	7
Emmy Awards	3	12
Golden Globe Awards	1	3
NAACP Image Awards	2	13
Spirit Awards	0	1
Screen Actors Guild Awards	4	12

Totals (Note: Certain award groups do not simply award one winner. They acknowledge several different recipients, have runners-up, and have third place. Since this is a specific recognition and is different from losing an award, runner-up mentions are considered wins in this award tally. For simplification and to avoid errors, each award in this list has been presumed to have had a prior nomination.)
- Wins: 24
- Nominations: 91

American actor Sterling K. Brown has received numerous accolades throughout his career, including three Primetime Emmy Awards, a Golden Globe Award, four Screen Actors Guild Awards, and a nomination for an Academy Award.

Brown's breakthrough performance as attorney Christopher Darden in The People v. O. J. Simpson: American Crime Story (2016) won him the Critics' Choice and Primetime Emmy and earned him nominations for the Golden Globe and SAG Award for Outstanding Actor in a Miniseries or Movie. His portrayal of Randall Pearson in NBC's This Is Us (2016–2022) won him the Critics' Choice, Golden Globe, Primetime Emmy and SAG Award for Outstanding Actor in a Drama Series, as well as another two SAG Awards as part of the series' ensemble cast. His win of the Emmy made him the first actor in a broadcast television series to win the award in a decade and the first African-American winner in 19 years. He was also the first African-American to win the Golden Globe and SAG Award.

Brown received additional Emmy nominations for This Is Us, as well as for guest starring in Brooklyn Nine-Nine (2018) and The Marvelous Mrs. Maisel (2020), and won Outstanding Narrator in 2021 for narrating Lincoln: Divided We Stand. With his nine Emmy nominations, Brown is one of few actors to be nominated across all three performance (lead, supporting, guest) and genre (comedy, drama, limited series or movie) categories, as well as for narrating. For his role in the Marvel Cinematic Universe film Black Panther (2018), Brown won the Screen Actors Guild Award for Outstanding Performance by a Cast in a Motion Picture.

Brown's portrayal of a middle aged gay man in Cord Jefferson's comedy-drama film American Fiction (2023) earned him nominations for the Academy Award, Critics' Choice, Independent Spirit and SAG Award for Best Supporting Actor.

== Major associations ==
=== Academy Awards ===
Year	Award/Category	Work	Result	Ref.
2023	Best Supporting Actor	American Fiction	Nominated	

=== Critics' Choice Awards ===
Year	Award/Category	Work	Result	Ref.
Critics' Choice Movie Awards
2024	Best Supporting Actor	American Fiction	Nominated	
Critics' Choice Television Awards
2016	Best Supporting Actor in a Movie/Miniseries	The People v. O. J. Simpson: American Crime Story	Won	
2018	Best Actor in a Drama Series	This Is Us	Won	
2020	Best Actor in a Drama Series	This Is Us	Nominated	
2021	Best Actor in a Drama Series	This Is Us	Nominated	
2022	Best Actor in a Drama Series	This Is Us	Nominated	
2023	Best Actor in a Drama Series	This Is Us	Nominated	
2026	Best Actor in a Drama Series	Paradise	Nominated	
Critics' Choice Super Awards
2026	Best Actor in an Action Series	Paradise	Won	
2026	Best Actor in a Science Fiction/Fantasy Series	Paradise	Won	

=== Emmy Awards ===
Year	Award/Category	Work	Result	Ref.
Primetime Emmy Awards
2016	Outstanding Supporting Actor in a Limited Series or Movie	American Crime Story: The People v. O.J. Simpson	Won	
2017	Outstanding Lead Actor in a Drama Series	This Is Us (episode: "Memphis")	Won	
2018	Outstanding Lead Actor in a Drama Series	This Is Us (episode: "Number Three")	Nominated	
2018	Outstanding Guest Actor in a Comedy Series	Brooklyn Nine-Nine (episode: "The Box")	Nominated	
2019	Outstanding Lead Actor in a Drama Series	This Is Us (episode: "R & B")	Nominated	
2020	Outstanding Lead Actor in a Drama Series	This Is Us (episode: "After the Fire")	Nominated	
2020	Outstanding Supporting Actor in a Comedy Series	The Marvelous Mrs. Maisel (episode: "Panty Pose")	Nominated	
2021	Outstanding Lead Actor in a Drama Series	This Is Us (episode: "Forty: Part 2")	Nominated	
2021	Outstanding Narrator	Lincoln: Divided We Stand (episode: "The Dogs of War")	Won	
2024	Outstanding Character Voice-Over Performance	Invincible (episode: "I Thought You Were Stronger")	Nominated	
2025	Outstanding Drama Series	Paradise (as executive producer)	Nominated	
2025	Outstanding Lead Actor in a Drama Series	Paradise (episode: "The Day")	Nominated	
2026	Outstanding Drama Series	Paradise (as executive producer)	Nominated	
2026	Outstanding Lead Actor in a Drama Series	Paradise (episode: TBD)	Nominated	

=== Golden Globe Awards ===
Year	Award/Category	Work	Result	Ref.
2016	Best Supporting Actor – Series, Miniseries or Television Film	American Crime Story: The People v. O.J. Simpson	Nominated	
2017	Best Actor in a Television Series – Drama	This Is Us (season 1)	Won	
2025	Best Actor in a Television Series – Drama	Paradise	Nominated	

=== Screen Actors Guild Awards ===
Year	Award/Category	Work	Result	Ref.
2016	Outstanding Male Actor in a Miniseries or Movie	American Crime Story: The People v. O.J. Simpson	Nominated	
2016	Outstanding Male Actor in a Drama Series	This Is Us (season 1)	Nominated	
2017	Outstanding Male Actor in a Drama Series	This Is Us (season 2)	Won	
2017	Outstanding Ensemble in a Drama Series	This Is Us (season 2)	Won	
2018	Outstanding Ensemble in a Drama Series	This Is Us (season 3)	Won	
2018	Outstanding Male Actor in a Drama Series	This Is Us (season 3)	Nominated	
2018	Outstanding Cast in a Motion Picture	Black Panther	Won	
2019	Outstanding Male Actor in a Drama Series	This Is Us (season 4)	Nominated	
2020	Outstanding Male Actor in a Drama Series	This Is Us (season 5)	Nominated	
2023	Outstanding Cast in a Motion Picture	American Fiction	Nominated	
2023	Outstanding Male Actor in a Supporting Role	American Fiction	Nominated	
2025	Outstanding Male Actor in a Drama Series	Paradise	Nominated	

== Miscellaneous awards ==
=== BET Awards ===
Year	Award/Category	Work	Result	Ref.
2018	Best Actor	Himself	Nominated	
2022	Best Actor	Himself	Nominated	
2025	Best Actor	Himself	Nominated	
2026	Best Actor	Himself	Nominated	

=== Black Reel Awards ===
Year	Award/Category	Work	Result	Ref.
2017	Outstanding Supporting Actor, TV Movie or Limited Series	The People v. O. J. Simpson: American Crime Story	Won	
2017	Outstanding Actor, Drama Series	This Is Us	Won	
2018	Best Breakthrough Performance, Male	Marshall	Nominated	
2018	Outstanding Actor, Drama Series	This Is Us	Won	
2018	Outstanding Guest Actor, Comedy Series	Insecure	Nominated	
2018	Outstanding Guest Actor, Comedy Series	Saturday Night Live	Nominated	
2019	Outstanding Actor, Drama Series	This Is Us	Nominated	
2020	Outstanding Supporting Actor	Waves	Nominated	
2020	Outstanding Actor, Drama Series	This Is Us	Won	
2020	Outstanding Guest Actor, Comedy Series	The Marvelous Mrs. Maisel	Nominated	
2022	Outstanding Actor, Drama Series	This Is Us	Won	
2023	Outstanding Actor	Honk for Jesus. Save Your Soul.	Nominated	
2024	Outstanding Supporting Performance	American Fiction	Nominated	

=== Independent Spirit Awards ===
Year	Award/Category	Work	Result	Ref.
2024	Best Supporting Performance	American Fiction	Nominated	

=== NAACP Image Awards ===
Year	Award/Category	Work	Result	Ref.
2017	Outstanding Actor in a Drama Series	This Is Us	Won	
2017	Outstanding Actor in a Television Movie, Mini-Series or Dramatic Special	The People v. O. J. Simpson: American Crime Story	Nominated	
2018	Outstanding Actor in a Drama Series	This Is Us	Nominated	
2018	Outstanding Supporting Actor in a Motion Picture	Marshall	Nominated	
2019	Outstanding Actor in a Drama Series	This Is Us	Nominated	
2020	Outstanding Supporting Actor in a Motion Picture	Waves	Nominated	
2020	Outstanding Actor in a Drama Series	This Is Us	Nominated	
2021	Outstanding Actor in a Drama Series	This Is Us	Nominated	
2022	Outstanding Actor in a Drama Series	This Is Us	Won	
2023	Outstanding Actor in a Motion Picture	Honk for Jesus. Save Your Soul.	Nominated	
2023	Outstanding Actor in a Drama Series	This Is Us	Nominated	
2024	Outstanding Supporting Actor in a Motion Picture	American Fiction	Nominated	
2024	Outstanding Ensemble Cast in a Motion Picture	American Fiction	Nominated	

=== People's Choice Awards ===
Year	Award/Category	Work	Result	Ref.
2019	The Male TV Star of 2019	This Is Us	Nominated	
2019	The Drama TV Star of 2019	This Is Us	Nominated	
2020	The Male TV Star of 2020	This Is Us	Nominated	
2020	The Drama TV Star of 2020	This Is Us	Nominated	
2021	The Male TV Star of 2021	This Is Us	Nominated	
2021	The Drama TV Star of 2021	This Is Us	Nominated	
2022	The Male TV Star of 2022	This Is Us	Nominated	
2022	The Drama TV Star of 2022	This Is Us	Nominated	

=== Teen Choice Awards ===
Year	Award/Category	Work	Result	Ref.
2017	Choice TV Actor Drama	This Is Us	Nominated	
2018	Choice TV Actor Drama	This Is Us	Nominated	
2019	Choice TV Actor Drama	This Is Us	Nominated	

== Critics awards ==
Year	Association	Category	Project	Result	Ref.
2024	African-American Film Critics Association	Best Supporting Actor	American Fiction	Won	
2024	Alliance of Women Film Journalists	Best Actor in a Supporting Role	American Fiction	Nominated	
2013	American Black Film Festival	Best Performance by an Actor (shared with Mekhi Phifer)	The Suspect	Nominated	
2024	Denver Film Festival	Excellence in Acting Award	American Fiction	Won	
2017	Dorian Awards	TV Performance of the Year — Actor	The People v. O. J. Simpson: American Crime Story	Nominated	
2018	Dorian Awards	TV Performance of the Year — Actor	This Is Us	Nominated	
2021	Hollywood Critics Association TV Awards	Best Actor in a Drama Series	This Is Us	Nominated	
2022	Hollywood Critics Association TV Awards	Best Actor in a Drama Series	This Is Us	Nominated	
2016	OFTA Television Awards	Best Supporting Actor in a Limited Series	The People v. O. J. Simpson: American Crime Story	Won	
2017	OFTA Television Awards	Best Actor in a Drama Series	This Is Us	Nominated	
2018	OFTA Television Awards	Best Actor in a Drama Series	This Is Us	Nominated	
2018	OFTA Television Awards	Best Guest Actor in a Comedy Series	Brooklyn Nine-Nine	Won	
2023	San Diego Film Critics Society	Best Supporting Actor	American Fiction	Nominated	
2023	San Francisco Bay Area Film Critics Circle Awards	Best Supporting Actor	American Fiction	Nominated	
2023	Seattle Film Critics Society Awards	Best Actor in a Supporting Role	American Fiction	Nominated	
2023	St. Louis Film Critics Association	Best Supporting Actor	American Fiction	Nominated	
2017	Television Critics Association Awards	Individual Achievement in Drama	This Is Us	Nominated	
