= Cyrano Fernández =

- Film poster
- Directed by: Alberto Arvelo
- Written by: Alberto Arvelo; Edmond Rostand (based on)
- Starring: Edgar Ramirez; Pastor Oviedo; Jessika Grau; Gledys Ibarra
- Music by: Mario de Benito; Nascuy Linares
- Distributed by: Indigo Media
- Release date: 2007
- Country: Venezuela
- Language: Spanish

Cyrano Fernández is a 2007 Venezuelan drama film based on the 1897 play Cyrano de Bergerac by Edmond Rostand, but set in contemporary times. Has credited as Executive Producers to Pedro Mezquita Arcaya, Carlos Lizarralde, Emilio Oviedo and Miguel Perelló.

== Synopsis ==
The movie is based on the love triangle between Cyrano (Édgar Ramírez), Cristian (Pastor Oviedo) and Roxanna (Jessika Grau) during riots between a group of drug dealers and the residents of a slum in Caracas.

Cyrano is a romantic writer and the social hero of his barrio, alluding to the leaders of the Tupamaro movement.

== Cast ==
- Edgar Ramirez as Cyrano Fernandez
- Beto Benites
- Jessika Grau as Roxana Padilla
- Pastor Oviedo
- Leonidas Urbina
- Hector Manrique as priest
- Leandro Arvelo as Nazareno, a young street gang

== Production ==
The film is set in the Cota 905 barrio of Caracas, where it was filmed; filming took place over eight weeks in 2006. The film also premiered in Cota 905.

Ramirez, after having made his Hollywood debut a few years earlier, was cast against type in Cyrano Fernández, with Cyrano different to Ramirez' "mostly one-dimensional 'macho' characters" to that point.

== Awards ==
At the 2008 Venezuelan film festival, the film won seven awards: Best Film, Best Director (Alberto Arvelo), Best Actor (Edgar Ramírez), Best Editing (Paco Bellot), Best Sound (Rosa María Oliart). It was also nominated for Best Cinematography (Cesary Javorsky) and Best Writing (Alberto Arvelo).

Ramirez won two other Best Actor awards for the film, his first major awards. One was from the Amiens International Film Festival, the other from the Málaga Film Festival.
