= Patas Arriba =

- Directed by: Alejandro García Wiedemann
- Starring: Gonzalo Camacho; Lourdes Valera; Michelle García; Adriana Deffenti; Juliana Betancourth
- Release date: 2011
- Country: Venezuela
- Language: Spanish

Patas arriba (lit. 'Upside Down') is a 2011 Venezuelan film directed by Alejandro García Wiedemann, best known for directing “Plan B”. This film is characterized because the main setting is the El Ávila National Park. It was winner of the 2012 Venezuelan Film Festival as “Best Film” and 5 other awards. It was also the winner of the 2012 Venezuelan Film Festival as “Best Film”.

== Cast ==
The plot tells of Renato, an old man whose dream before dying is to sail from La Guaira to Salvador de Bahia, but the only thing that stands between him and his dream is none other than his family, who want to send him against his will to a hospital. What none of them imagine is that Renato, with the help of his granddaughter Carlota, is going to surprise them all and try to solve the problems of a family that is "upside down".

== Cast ==
- Gonzalo Camacho
- Lourdes Valera
- Michelle García
- Erich Wildpret
- Marialejandra Martín
- Basilio Álvarez
- Dimas González
- Daniela Bascopé
- Tania Sarabia
- Sindy Lazo
- Eduardo Gadea Pérez
- André Ramiro
- Adriana Deffenti
- Juliana Betancourth

== Awards ==
Awards	Category	Result	Nomination	Ref
Venezuelan Film Festival 2012	Best Direction	Won	Alejandro García Wiedemann	
Venezuelan Film Festival 2012	Best Screenplay	Won	Gabriela Rivas Páez	
Venezuelan Film Festival 2012	Best Actor	Won	Gonzalo Camacho	
Venezuelan Film Festival 2012	Best Music	Won	Alonso Toro	
Venezuelan Film Festival 2012	Best Camera	Won	Julio César Castro	
Venezuelan Film Festival 2012	Best Feature Film	Won	Patas Arriba	
