= Erich Wildpret =

Venezuelan actor

- Born: Caracas, Venezuela
- Occupations: Actor, theater actor, screenwriter, singer
- Years active: 1989-present
- Notable work: The Zero Hour, Libertador

Erich Wildpret (born 5 July 1968) is a Venezuelan-German-American film and television actor and director.

== Selected filmography ==
Year	Title	Role	Notes
1989	Maya	Larry	
1991	Un Sueño en el Abismo	Tomas	
2000	Manuela Saenz, la libertadora del libertador	Hernan Melville	
2003	Amor en concreto	Clemencia	
2006	Elipsis	Gabo	with Edgar Ramirez
2007	Puras Joyitas	Funboy	
2007	El cafe de lupe ( shortfilm)		
2009	Zona cero ( shortfilm)	terrorista	
2010	The Zero Hour	Ricardo Cova	
2010	Un lugar lejano	Julian	
2010	Desautorizado	Elias- Vincent	
2011	Samuel	Samuel	Also Screenwriter
2011	Una Casa patas Arriba	Gabriel	
2012	Memorias De Un soldado	Braulio	Lead Role
2013	The Liberator	Antonio Jose de Sucre	
2016	Interlude: City of dead Woman	Esteban	Shooting in Greece
2016	Castle Tv Series	Mike Walsh	8x16
2017	Better Things ( Tv Series)	Pedro	Season 2, first episode.
2020	Aqui Pasaron Cinco Lorcas	Federico Garcia Lorca	Musical Concert by zoom
2022	Jezabel	TBA	Directed by Hern Jabes
