= Carlos Lizarralde =

Venezuelan writer and entrepreneur

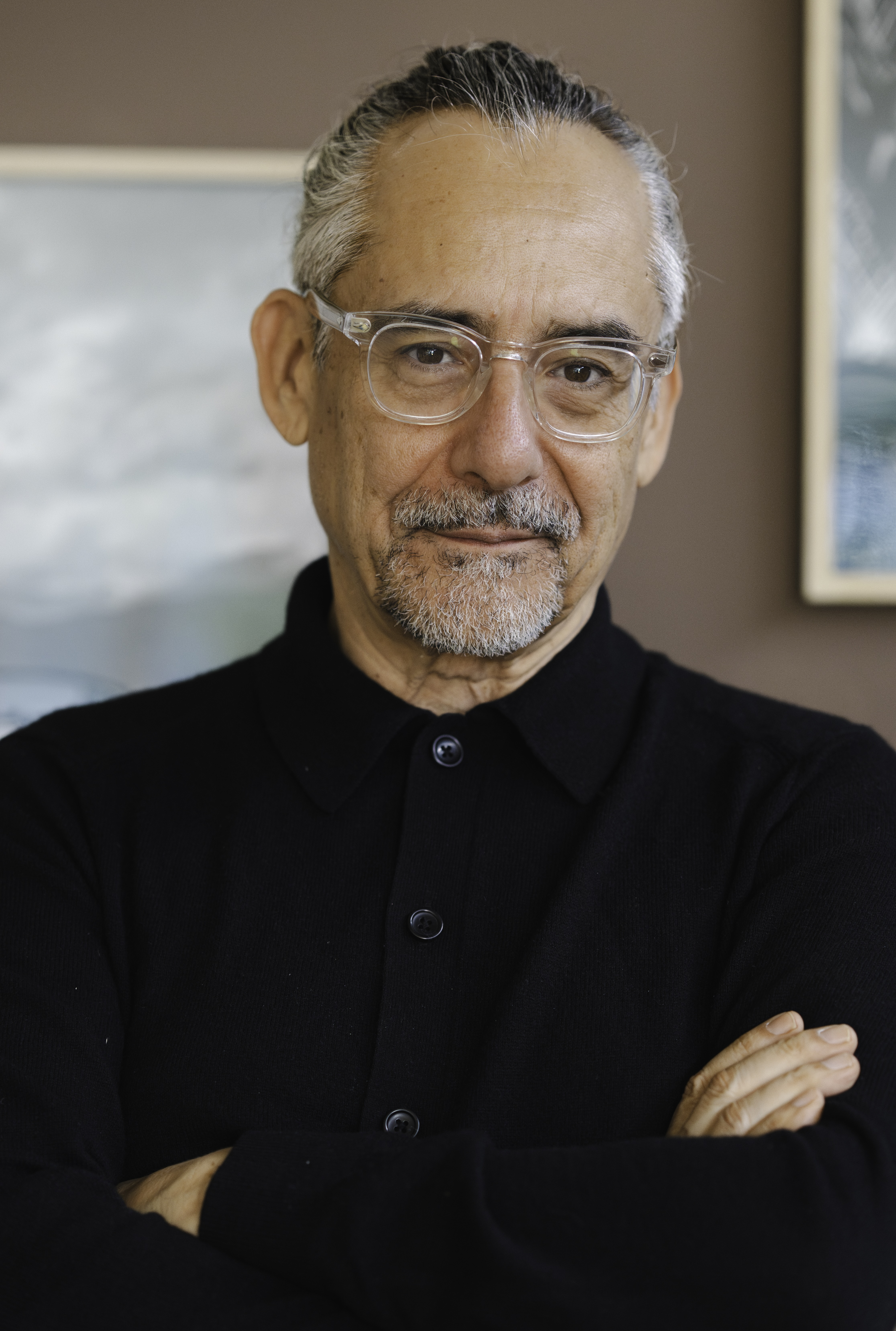
- Carlos Lizarralde in 2024
- Born: Caracas, Venezuela
- Citizenship: Venezuelan, Spanish, American
- Education: Hampshire College (BA); University of Massachusetts Amherst
- Occupations: Writer, entrepreneur
- Notable work: Venezuela's Collapse (2024); One in Four (2025)
- Website: lizarralde.com

Carlos Lizarralde is a Venezuelan writer and entrepreneur. His work examines the historical, racial, and ethnic structures of Venezuela, specifically regarding the socio-political collapse and the mass exodus that began in the early 21st century.

== Education and early career ==
Lizarralde studied politics and literary theory at Hampshire College and pursued a doctorate in Comparative Literature at the University of Massachusetts Amherst.

In 1996, he co-founded the alternative youth weekly Urbe in Caracas, where he served as publisher. In 1997, he co-founded the magazine Radar.

During a twenty-five-year career in media and technology, Lizarralde's entrepreneurial ventures were profiled in publications including The Wall Street Journal and Forbes.

== Literary work ==
In 2024, Lizarralde published Venezuela's Collapse: The Long Story of How Things Fell Apart. The book traces five centuries of demographic and economic strands to analyze the rise of Chavismo. In a review for the Harvard Review of Latin America (ReVista), the work was noted for centering the Venezuelan crisis on deep-seated social and ethnic conflicts rather than solely on conventional political or economic mismanagement.

In 2025, he followed with One in Four: The Exodus that Emptied Venezuela, 2019–2024, an analysis of the demographic collapse and the migration of nearly eight million people.

Lizarralde is a contributor to international media on Venezuelan affairs. His analysis has appeared in The Guardian, The Independent, and Norway's public broadcaster NRK. He has also written for Persuasion, Caracas Chronicles, and Papel Literario, the literary supplement of El Nacional.

== Works ==
- Venezuela's Collapse: The Long Story of How Things Fell Apart (2024). Codex Novellus. ISBN 979-8-9888756-0-4.
  - Spanish edition: La Gran Venezuela: La larga historia de cómo se desmoronó todo (2025). Translated by Rafael Osío Cabrices. Editorial Dahbar. ISBN 979-8-9888756-2-8.
  - Audiobook: Venezuela's Collapse (2025). Narrated by Erica Heidepriem. Codex Novellus/Audible. ISBN 979-8-9888756-3-5.
- One in Four: The Exodus that Emptied Venezuela, 2019–2024 (2025). Codex Novellus. ISBN 979-8-9888756-4-2.

== Reception ==
Lizarralde's work has been cited by prominent figures in Venezuelan and international literature. New York Times bestselling author Ariana Neumann described Venezuela's Collapse as a "thorough and serious examination of Venezuelan history." Playwright and National Medal of Arts recipient Moisés Kaufman characterized the work as a definitive chronicle of the historical events leading to the presidency of Hugo Chávez. Journalist Boris Muñoz, a Maria Moors Cabot Award winner, noted that the book "sheds light on the roots of its current crisis" through its historical narrative.
