= Jungle Cruise (film) =

2021 film by Jaume Collet-Serra

- Theatrical release poster
- Directed by: Jaume Collet-Serra
- Screenplay by: Michael Green; Glenn Ficarra; John Requa
- Story by: John Norville; Josh Goldstein; Glenn Ficarra; John Requa
- Based on: Walt Disney's Jungle Cruise
- Produced by: John Davis; John Fox; Beau Flynn; Dwayne Johnson; Dany Garcia; Hiram Garcia
- Starring: Dwayne Johnson; Emily Blunt; Édgar Ramírez; Jack Whitehall; Jesse Plemons; Paul Giamatti
- Cinematography: Flavio Labiano
- Edited by: Joel Negron
- Music by: James Newton Howard
- Production companies: Walt Disney Pictures; Davis Entertainment; Seven Bucks Productions; Flynn Picture Company
- Distributed by: Walt Disney Studios Motion Pictures
- Release dates: July 24, 2021 (Disneyland Resort); July 30, 2021 (United States)
- Running time: 127 minutes
- Country: United States
- Language: English
- Budget: $200 million
- Box office: $220.9 million (Note: The film had made $66 million from domestic digital sales, though it is not factored into box office grosses.)

Jungle Cruise is a 2021 American fantasy adventure film based on the Disney theme park attraction. Produced by Walt Disney Pictures, it stars Dwayne Johnson, Emily Blunt, Édgar Ramírez, Jack Whitehall, Jesse Plemons, and Paul Giamatti. Directed by Jaume Collet-Serra from a screenplay by Glenn Ficarra, John Requa, and Michael Green, it tells the alternate history of the skipper of a small riverboat who takes a scientist and her brother through a jungle in search of the Tree of life while competing against a German expedition, and cursed conquistadors.

Plans for a feature film based on the Jungle Cruise ride began in 2004. The project lay dormant until 2011. The original version fell through, and Johnson joined in 2015. Blunt and the rest of the cast joined in 2018 in a revamped version, with filming taking place in Hawaii and Georgia, from May through September that year. The score was composed by James Newton Howard.

Following a year of post-production and a year of further delay due to the COVID-19 pandemic, Jungle Cruise premiered at Disneyland Resort on July 24, 2021, and was released in the United States on July 30, simultaneously in theaters and digitally. The film received mixed reviews from critics, and was a box-office disappointment, grossing $221 million against a budget of $200 million. It also made $66 million over its first 30 days on Disney+ Premier Access.

== Plot ==
In 1556, Don Aguirre leads Spanish conquistadors to South America to search for the Tears of the Moon, a mythical tree whose flowers can cure illness and lift curses, believing it may save his ill daughter. After many conquistadors die, the Puka Michuna tribe heals the survivors with the Tree's flowers. Aguirre asks for the arrowhead, that can reveal the Tree's location, but the tribal chief refuses, so Aguirre stabs him and burns the village. As his daughter escapes with the arrowhead, the dying chief curses the conquistadors, making them immortal and unable to leave sight of the Amazon River without being dragged back by the jungle itself.

In 1916 London, McGregor Houghton presents his sister Dr. Lily Houghton's research of the Tree to the Royal Society, which bars female members. The Houghtons hope to revolutionize medicine and aid the British war effort, so they request access to a recently acquired arrowhead that Lily believes can locate the Tree in Lágrimas de Cristal (Note: lit. 'Crystal Tears' in Spanish; the term is used in the film to describe Tears of the Moon, a mythical tree) but are denied. Lily steals the arrowhead, narrowly evading Prince Joachim, who is equally intent on finding the Tree for himself and the German Empire.

After arriving in Brazil, Lily and MacGregor hire skipper Frank Wolff to guide them down the Amazon. Frank, who offers jungle cruises embellished with faked dangers, initially declines, citing the dangerous river and jungle, but reconsiders upon seeing the arrowhead. The trio departs after escaping Joachim's U-boat.

While snooping through Frank's cabin below deck, Lily discovers his research of the Tree, but he insists he stopped searching long ago. They are captured by cannibals that are actually the Puka Michuna who work for Frank as part of his contrived jungle cruise. Angered, Lily arrogantly accuses Frank of being a liar and decides to find the Tree herself. Tribal chief Trader Sam translates the symbols on the arrowhead, revealing the Tree's location at La Luna Rota, (Note: lit. 'The Broken Moon' in Spanish; the term is used in the film for the location where the crying moon has grown a tree) and that it only blooms under a blood moon.

Meanwhile, Joachim locates the conquistadors petrified inside a cave and partially revives them with Amazon water. Aguirre agrees to bring Joachim the arrowhead in exchange for lifting the curse when he finds the flowers. Joachim diverts river water to flood the cave which reanimates Aguirre and his conquistadors and infuses them with rainforest elements. The conquistadors attack the tribe and Aguirre stabs Frank through the heart. Lily flees with the arrowhead, chased by conquistadors, but the jungle vines pull them back to the river before they can catch her.

To the Houghtons' amazement, an alive Frank soon reappears and reveals he is also a cursed conquistador. He helped search for the Tree to save Aguirre's daughter but sided with the tribe against Aguirre's brutality. After years of endless fighting, Frank trapped his vengeful comrades in the cave away from the river, petrifying them. Failing to find the Tree, Frank remained tied to the river, becoming a tour guide and building a village; causing Lily to realise how wrong she was about him. Lily and Frank travel to La Luna Rota and discover a submerged temple containing the Tree. Meanwhile, Joachim has captured McGregor and forces him to reveal Lily's location. Frank, the Houghtons, the Germans, and the conquistadors all converge at the Tree.

Discovering the arrowhead is a locket containing a red gem, Lily inserts the two pieces into carvings in the bark; the Tree briefly blooms under the blood moon. As a fight ensues, Lily recovers one flower, while the German soldiers drown, Joachim is crushed by a falling rock, and Frank crashes his boat into the temple to block the river, petrifying himself and the rest of the conquistadors to save Lily. Realizing her true feelings for Frank, Lily sacrifices the flower to lift the curse and restore his mortality. The moon's last beam blooms a single flower, which Lily takes for research. Returning to the village port, Frank sells his business and leaves the Amazon to be with Lily.

Returning to Britain, Lily becomes a full professor at the University of Cambridge and sends McGregor on her behalf to reject an invitation to join the Royal Society. Lily and Frank then explore London together as she teaches him how to drive a car.

== Cast ==
- Dwayne Johnson as Frank Wolff / Francisco López de Heredia: A shrewd and cynical but ultimately noble 400-year-old steamboat skipper who reluctantly agrees to guide two explorers on their quest for the mythical Tree. He eventually reveals his true name and identity as Francisco, Aguirre's adopted brother and one of the cursed conquistadors, forever trapped by the Amazon River. He is a trained cartographer who has spent centuries searching for the Tree to break the curse that made him immortal so he can die peacefully. Meanwhile, he has built a town, and a boat he christened La Quila for his business under "Jungle Navigation Company" while owning a series of tamed exotic cats as pets, each named "Proxima". (Note: lit. 'next' in Spanish)
- Emily Blunt as Dr. Lily Houghton: An eccentric, adventurous and virtuous botanist working in a male-dominated field, who hopes to find the Tree in order to harness its power for modern medicine. Possessing an ancient arrowhead and one of Frank's old maps of the Amazon, she proves she is resourceful and capable in martial arts and lock picking skills, despite the fact that she cannot swim until Frank teaches her at La Luna Rota. She wants to prove herself equal to her chauvinistic peers but gains some notoriety for wearing trousers.
- Édgar Ramírez as Aguirre: A Spanish conquistador who once sought the Tree's power to save his ill daughter, only to be cursed with immortality for his vicious treatment towards its guardians. Temporarily freed by German explorers, he sets out to take revenge on his adopted brother, Frank, for turning on him. His partially decomposed body is now composed of an infestation of snakes and as such, he possesses the ability to convert part or all of his body into snakes.
- Jack Whitehall as MacGregor Houghton: Lily's younger brother who works as her assistant. He confesses to Frank that the rest of their family disowned him after he was outed as being gay following his third dismissal of marriage to a woman(though this is never explicitly stated), prompting Lily to hire him so he could support himself. He has been loyal to her ever since. As a somewhat foppish snob who adheres to proper etiquette and prefers wearing three-piece suits, he seems ill-suited to jungle life, but gradually develops into a more confident, rugged man by the end of the expedition.
- Jesse Plemons as Prince Joachim: A narcissistic and ambitious German royal who finances and leads a military expedition with mercenaries to claim the Tree of Life, both to aid Germany's war effort and achieve immortality. He receives aid from the cursed conquistadors after he frees them for his own interest, and communicates with them through their bees and snakes.
- Paul Giamatti as Nilo Nemolato: The harbormaster at Nilo's River Adventure, Porto Velho, where Frank moors his boat. Nilo owns a Moluccan cockatoo named "Rosita". He is also a business rival, and confiscates Frank's boat engine when Frank is unable to repay him a loan with Rosita constantly quoting "Frank owes me money". This leads Frank to wreck Nilo's prize boats in return.

Additionally, Verónica Falcón plays Trader Sam, the female chief of the Puka Michuna tribe in 1916, who is a longtime friend of Frank's and knows about the curse. The Puka Michuna tribe has a centuries-long history of guarding the Tree, but Sam does not know the exact location herself until Lily shows her the arrowhead. Dan Dargan Carter, Dani Rovira, and Quim Gutiérrez play Aguirre's fellow conquistadors, as, respectively: Gonzalo, whose partially decomposed body is composed of tree parts and vines; Sancho, whose is composed of honeycombs and the colonies of honeybees that ride on him; and Melchor, whose is composed of mud and the poison dart frogs that ride on him. The latter two conquistadors have the ability to dissolve into their constituent parts to rapidly move through the jungle, as well as maintain telepathic control of the creatures inhabiting their bodies. Andy Nyman plays Sir James Hobbs-Coddington, the Royal Society's artifact handler who briefly helps Prince Joachim; while Raphael Alejandro plays Zaqueu, Frank's young assistant.

Other characters include the chief of the Puka Michuna tribe in 1556, played by Pedro López, who cursed the conquistadors; and his daughter, played by Sulem Calderón, who protects the artifact away from the jungle. Also, stunt-actor Ben Jenkin was on set for the motion-capture of Proxima, Frank's devoted pet jaguar. She is one of a series of exotic South American cats rescued and trained by Frank that were all given the same name. Out of fear and later affectionately, MacGregor nicknames her "Murder Cat".

=== References to the ride ===
Frank's puns are derived from the skipper's lines on the original theme park ride. Lily's personality is inspired by Indiana Jones. The boat is named after Mama Killa. The cockatoo — whose real name is "Lover Girl" — is named after the singing bird "Rosita" at Disneyland's Enchanted Tiki Room. The film has several elements referencing Dr. Albert Falls, a fictional character at Disneyland who has discovered Schweitzer Falls and has founded the Jungle Navigation Company.

== Production ==
=== Early versions ===
In December 2004, it was announced that Jungle Cruise would be developed for Mandeville Films, with a script by Josh Goldstein and John Norville. Following the success of Pirates of the Caribbean, the film was to take place sometime in the twentieth century and was loosely inspired by the theme park attraction of the same name which featured prominently in Disneyland's grand opening in 1955. In 2006, Alfred Gough and Miles Millar were in talks to write the film. In February 2011, it was announced that Tom Hanks and Tim Allen, who had previously worked together in the Toy Story franchise, would star in the long-gestating film, with a script to be written by Roger S. H. Schulman.

=== Pre-production ===
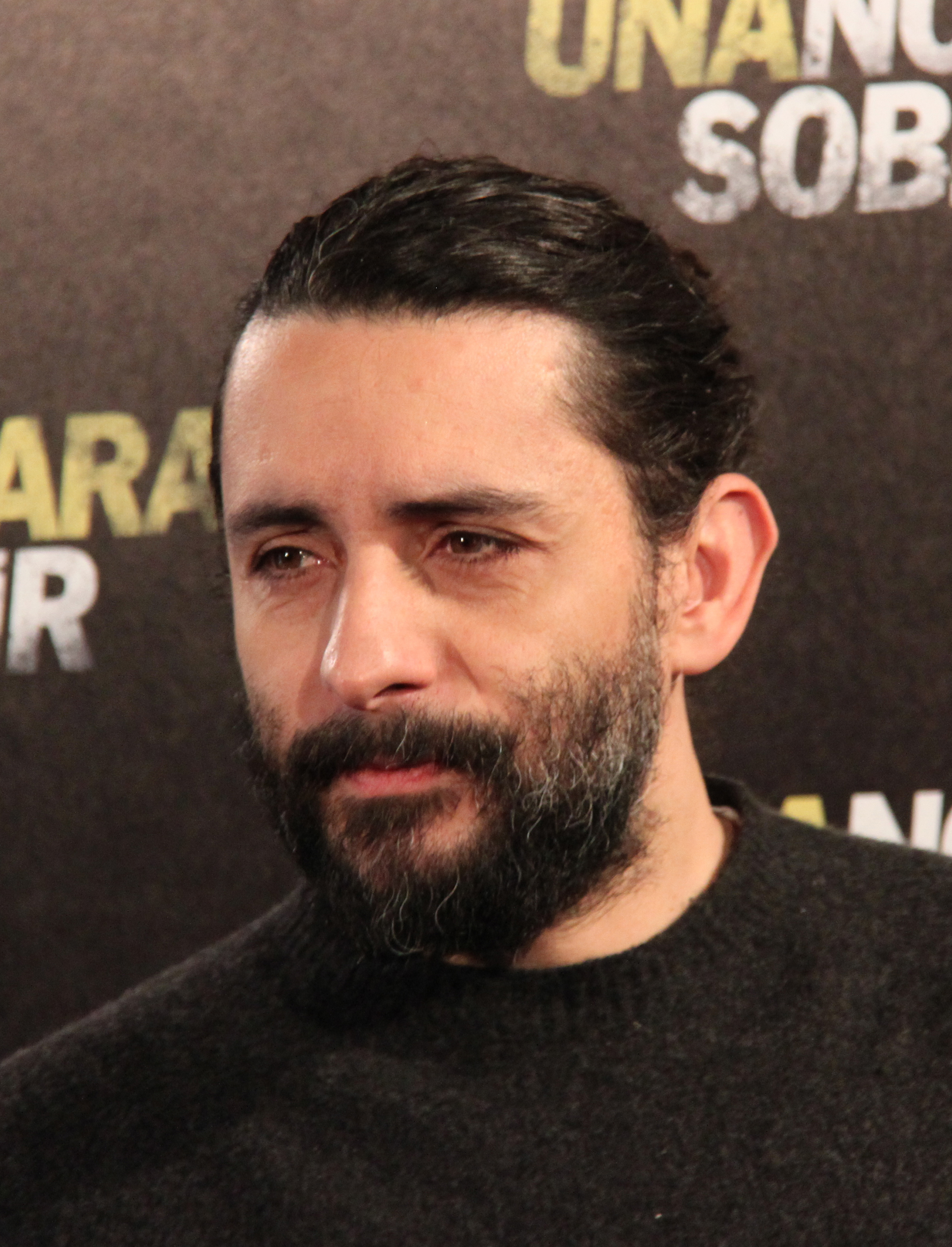
Jaume Collet-Serra, director of Jungle Cruise

In August 2015, it was announced that Walt Disney Pictures was revamping the film adaptation to star Dwayne Johnson. The previous script originally written by Goldstein and Norville would be rewritten by John Requa and Glenn Ficarra with the intention to harken back to its period roots. John Davis and John Fox signed on as producers.

Johnson, who did a lot of research before getting into the role, announced in April 2017 that he would co-produce the film under his Seven Bucks Productions, and he expressed his interest in having Patty Jenkins helm the project. However, in July 2017, Jaume Collet-Serra was announced as the director of the film. In January 2018, Michael Green was reported to have rewritten the script, previously worked on by J. D. Payne and Patrick McKay. Also, Emily Blunt signed on, as Johnson wanted her to be his co-star. Blunt was paid between $8–10 million for her involvement.

=== Casting ===
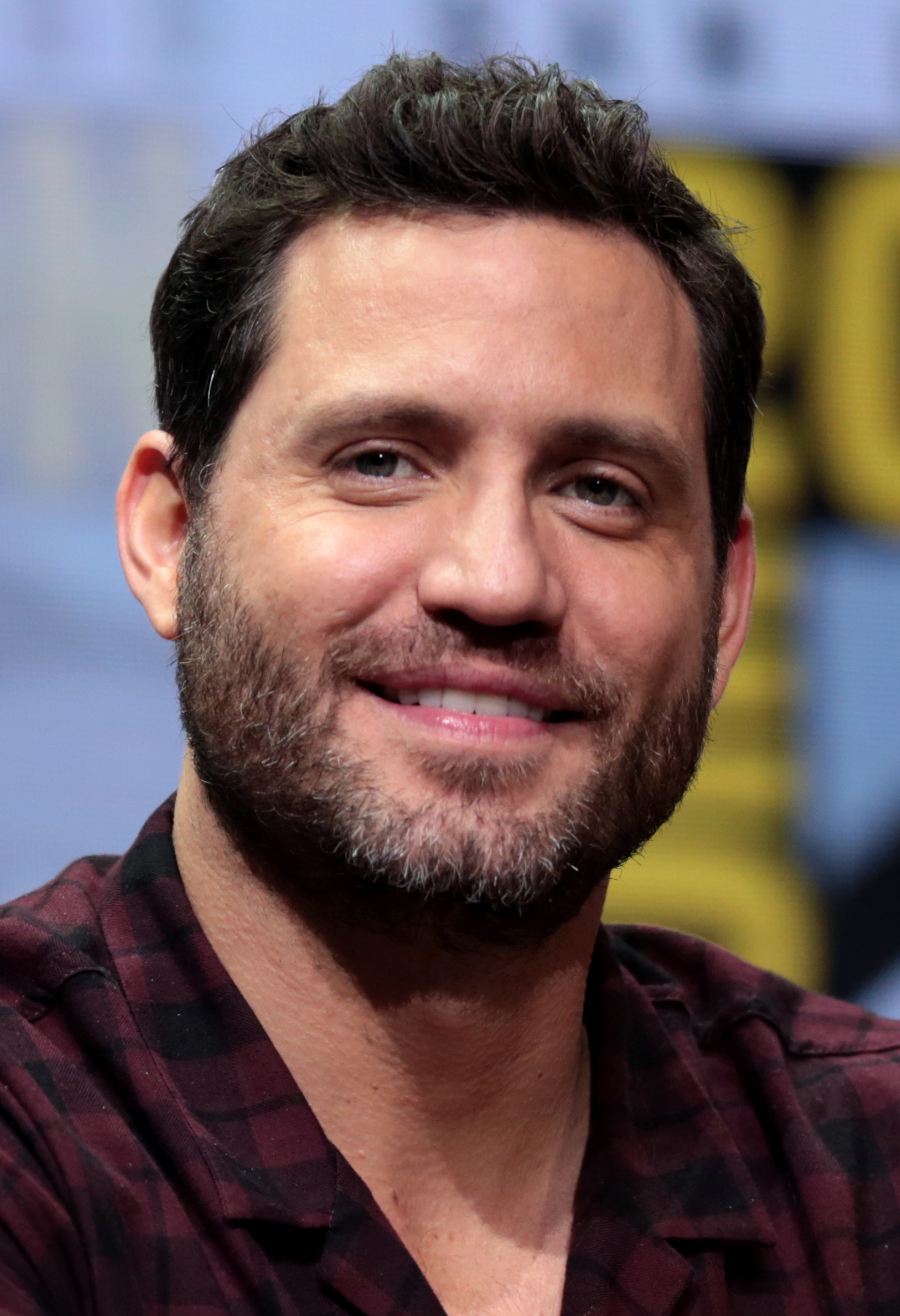
Édgar Ramírez plays the role of Aguirre

In March 2018, an open casting call was made for the other characters in the film, including men and women of all ethnicities between ages 17 to 100 and children between 6 and 14 years old.

In the same month, Jack Whitehall was cast as the brother of Blunt's character. Six months later, it was reported that he would have a coming out scene in the film with Johnson. This would be the second incidence of a gay character in a live-action Disney film, the first being Le Fou, portrayed by Josh Gad, in the 2017 adaptation of Beauty and the Beast. There was some backlash over the report, with some people online expressing anger over a straight man being cast as a "camp" gay character.

In April 2018, Édgar Ramírez and Jesse Plemons were added to the cast as villains with the former being "a man with a conquistador background". In May, Paul Giamatti was cast to portray a "crusty harbormaster". In June, Quim Gutiérrez joined the cast to portray one of the villains. In July, it was announced that Veronica Falcón, Dani Rovira, and Andy Nyman had joined the cast. Before Falcón was cast as Trader Sam, a role inspired by a male character at the theme park, it was discussed whether the role would be a male or a female character in the film.

=== Filming ===
The first span of the shoot began on May 16, 2018, in Hawaii, where a port town was set up at Kapaia Reservoir, Kauai, near Wailua Falls. The set took one month to scout, two months to design, and four months to build, dress, and landscape while being challenged by the flood rains. Other shoot locations include the town of Lihue, the Kauai Plantation Railway, and Huleia Stream. After seven weeks, the shoot then moved for a major course at Blackhall Studios, Atlanta, where a pool was set up in a large tank like the river, as well as the jungle in it. Some scenes were also filmed at the Oxford College of Emory University.

Two 39 ft (12 m) boats were built for easy logistics in filming at both the locations, revealed production designer Jean-Vincent Puzos. Paco Delgado said that while some of the suits are original from the twentieth century, the costumes for the main characters and the tribals were specially made for the film, for which he researched the cultures of different tribes in the Amazon. He said that Amelia Earhart was the inspiration for Blunt's costume. Joel Harlow did make-up for 400 background characters to detail their appearance whether with a sunburn or an insect bite, also he made tattoo designs for 65 tribal characters. Tanoai Reed and Myles Humphus were Johnson's stunt doubles while Lauren Shaw was Blunt's.

The film's cinematographer Flavio Martínez Labiano revealed that the blue screen technology was used. Magenta-tinted lights were used for a sequence of the tree. He also wanted to show colorful "London in the summer" unlike many other films which depict London in winter when "it's foggy and it's blue". Arri Alexa SXT Plus cameras were used, with specially designed Panavision C-Series anamorphic lenses. To shoot the underwater sequence, a puzzle set was built in the second tank, and then it was filled with water. Underwater cinematographer Ian Seabrook said that it took about two weeks to shoot simultaneously while the main cast was also busy shooting in the first tank, so the stunt doubles had to be present there too. He said that while Johnson was a strong swimmer, Blunt showed no fear despite being a novice in acting underwater. (In any case, the water tank had emergency exits for her to the right and the left of the camera.) The set had to be pulled out of the water by a crane so he handheld the camera throughout.

Filming wrapped on September 14, with about 95 days of principal photography. A few re-shoots took place before June 2019, which took three weeks in Atlanta. Johnson shared that the film pays homage to The African Queen, Romancing the Stone, and Indiana Jones.

=== Post-production ===
Ethan Van der Ryn and Erik Aadahl served as the sound designers, while Joel Negron served as the film editor, with DNEG, Industrial Light & Magic, Rodeo FX, Rising Sun Pictures, and Weta Digital providing the visual effects, along with The Third Floor. It took about a year in the post-production stage, but was shut down in March 2020 due to the pandemic, however, it resumed in the summer and was completed in September 2020.

The colour of the Amazon river is very distinctive. The water had to appear brown, but not dirty to reflect its organic nature. We also produced more than 200 varieties of trees and distributed them in a procedural way across the landscape in a manner consistent with how they occur in real life. Our widest shot includes more than 10 million trees, bushes and other species.

— Malte Sarnes, VFX supervisor at RSP

After filming and before the post-production phase, the teams were sent to the Amazon rainforest, Brazil, and Costa Rica forest, where they recorded the actual surroundings, including "pristine wildlife and hundreds of species of exotic birds", so the background effects library can be created for the film, using different types of microphones, including ambisonic and parabolic. Two Alexa Minis, a drone, and several cameras were used for the reference photography and footage, which took about three weeks.

The port town, the water, and the jungle were all built on a limited scale and were extended through CGI to create backgrounds. Plate shots were also captured at the Colorado River; these were used to animate the turbulent and aerated water, so the boat can be animated running at 200 km/h (120 mph) on the river as its journey is seen in the film. The 3D team made such effects like "light reflecting off the water, bugs flying around and dew glistening on leaves", so the film weather looks humid in the summer. The submarine was also digitally extended after it was shot in a tank. To visualize the explosions by torpedo, rubber and wooden structures were used.

The big trick with that was the art direct-ability of the boat, the speed of which you went through the rapids and what kind of splashes it made. I think with a sequence like that, it's so heavily buried in physics. And if you start to try and cheat those physics, which is what happens a lot of the time, then the simulation stuff all goes right out the window, and it breaks everything.

— Luke Millar, VFX supervisor at Weta Digital

To portray the character of Proxima, a stunt actor in a jaguar morphsuit, as well as a stuffed toy, were on set. To animate it for the film, a collection of plates from big cats was used with most references taken from a female jaguar in San Diego Zoo, before its 3D modeling and sculpting, with details like a mark on her forehead, a folded-over ear, and the muscle and skin system. Other animals were also observed to create its reaction to interactions. A pet cat also made an appearance as baby Proxima. In sequences of the pink river dolphins, each one was animated separately to build its own character, while the piranhas were also created with CGI.

To animate the conquistadors, each character was built with different body parts to make it not completely human. Materials were gathered to study the actual movements of the snakes for the animation, and the character was made serpentine; with sounds of the snake recorded from pressurized air releases. The frogs were recorded from Costa Rica forest for the mud guy, while honeycomb dripping sound was used for the beehive guy. The sounds of wood stress were used for the tree guy; whose character was completely animated except for some of his only facial expressions. Initially, there were ideas to explore more of the conquistadors with different characteristics, but these were settled on four only.

The scene for the Tree of Life was animated after taking inspiration from "Banyan trees, Baobabs, Angkor Wat and native South American trees" to give it an ancient look. The branches were made in higher resolution "to keep the Tree very organic and verging on gnarled". The tree growth and petal variations were observed, and lighting balance was considered, in order to animate the exposing and reverting luminosity of the petals after merging different shots; the sequence also contains fully-digital characters.

Most of the environmental surroundings and water elements were built and animated on Houdini, while the greenery was developed on SpeedTree.

=== Music ===
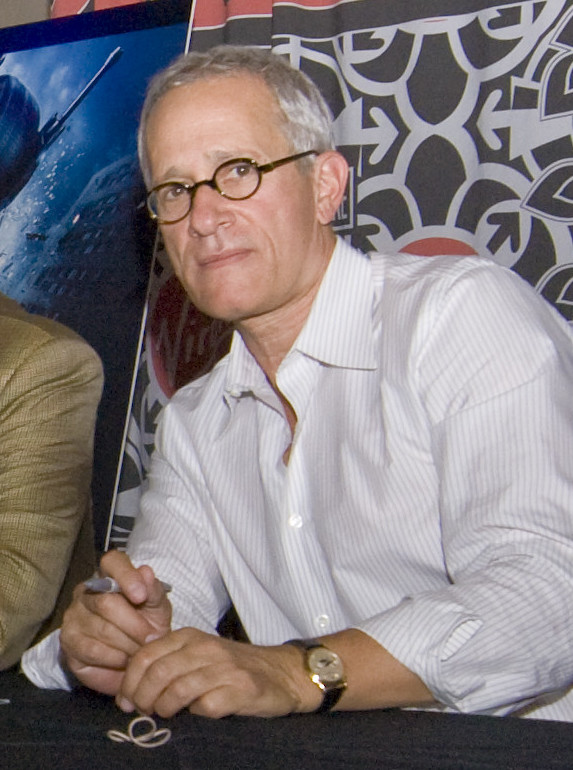
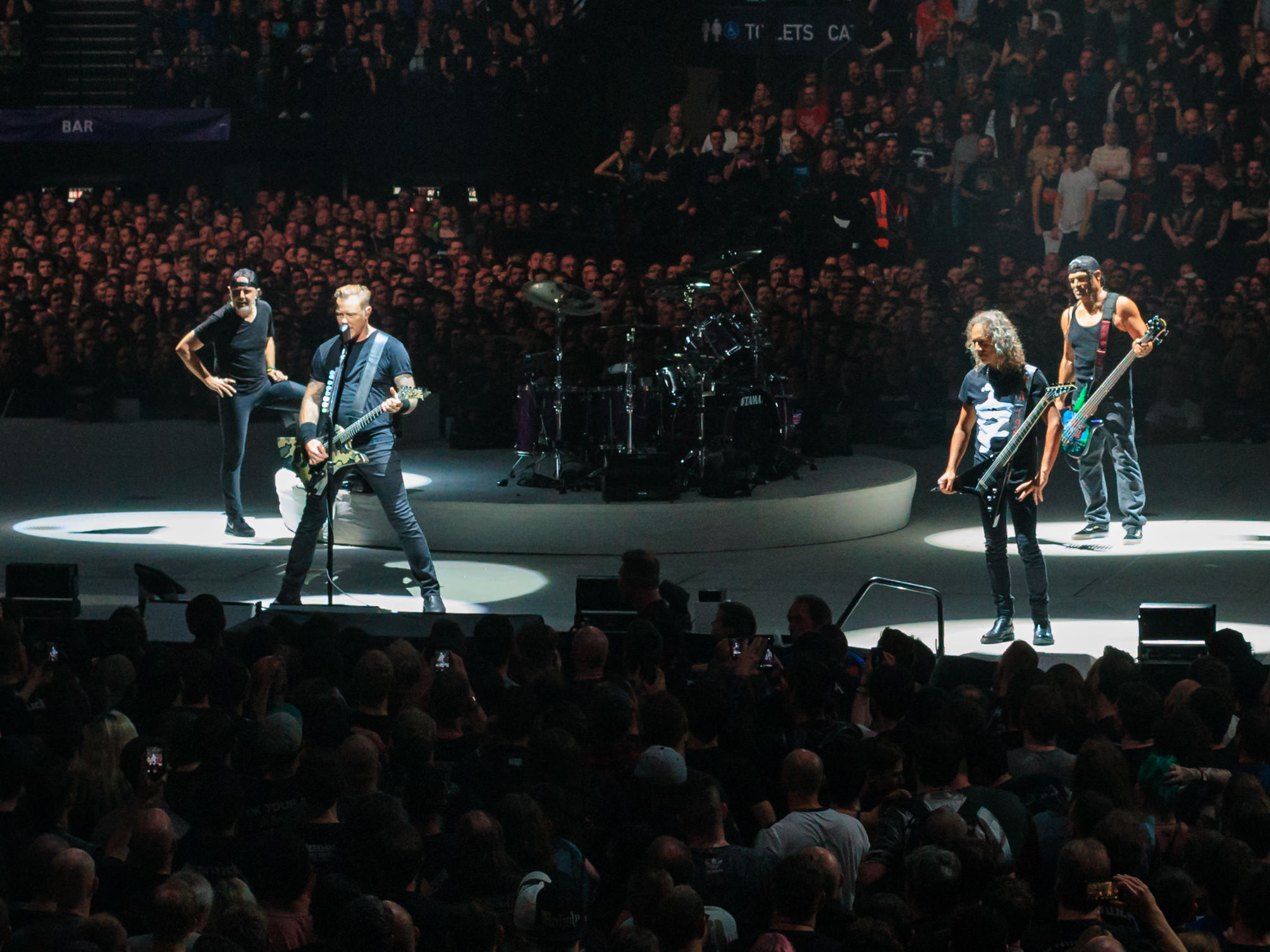
James Newton Howard composed the score of Jungle Cruise; Metallica also collaborated for an instrumental version of one of their tracks.

In January 2019, it was announced that James Newton Howard joined the production as the film score composer. By August 2020, it was revealed that Metallica collaborated with Howard on an instrumental version of their song "Nothing Else Matters" for the film. According to the band's drummer, Lars Ulrich, Metallica worked on the film after Walt Disney Pictures president Sean Bailey felt like Jungle Cruise was "the right fit" for a collaboration between Disney and Metallica. Bailey had been "always looking for the right match where there was a way that Metallica could contribute to some Disney project". The band members recorded their parts from their individual studios, due to the COVID-19 pandemic.

The score was recorded in February 2020 by a 99-person orchestra, with vocals provided by 40 members from the Los Angeles Master Chorale. In order to add a "regional flavor", Howard incorporated panpipes and Brazilian percussion instruments. Frequent Metallica collaborator Greg Fidelman served as associate producer and engineer. The soundtrack album was released on July 30, 2021, by Walt Disney Records.

== Release ==
=== Theatrical and streaming ===
Jungle Cruise had its world premiere at Disneyland Resort in Anaheim, California, on July 24, 2021. It was released in the United States on July 30, 2021, simultaneously in theaters and on Disney+ with Premier Access for US$29.99. It had a special screening on July 29, 2021, by D23 at El Capitan Theatre.

Initially, it was slated for October 11, 2019, before being moved to July 24, 2020, and was postponed due to the COVID-19 pandemic. In May 2021, Disney announced that the film would be released simultaneously in theaters and on Disney+ with Premier Access, due to the continued closure of theaters in markets like Brazil and Europe as the SARS-CoV-2 Delta variant surged. This is the last Disney+ Premier Access release to date, with Disney mostly instituting a 45-day exclusive theatrical window before coming to stream.

It was also released in India on September 24, and in China on November 12, 2021.

=== Home media ===
Jungle Cruise had a digital release on August 31 and it was released via 4K, Blu-ray, and DVD on November 16; this includes 11 deleted scenes, and 6 bonus featurettes.

It debuted atop the "NPD Videoscan First Alert", ranking first in both the overall disc sales and Blu-ray sales. 55% of the sales came from Blu-ray, including 16% from 4K Blu-ray and 39% from traditional Blu-ray. The following week it was displaced to the second position by F9 due to the discounts offered around Black Friday, while ranking first on Redbox's rental charts. The third week saw it falling to the third rank in overall disc sales while retaining its position on the Redbox rental charts.

== Reception ==
=== PVOD viewership ===
In its opening weekend, Disney reported the film made $30 million from worldwide Disney+ Premier sales, with Samba TV saying $23.3 million of it came from 770,000 U.S. households. Through its first 10 days of release, Samba reported the film had been streamed in 1.5 million households for a running domestic Premier Access gross of $44.98 million. By the end of its first 30 days, the viewership had grown to 2.2 million households for an estimated revenue of $66 million.

After its release on disc, the film topped Redbox's digital chart for two consecutive weeks. In the third week, it dropped to the fourth rank. In January 2022, tech firm Akamai reported that Jungle Cruise was the tenth most pirated film of 2021.

=== Box office ===
Jungle Cruise grossed $117 million in the United States and Canada and $104 million in other territories for a worldwide total of $221 million. With an estimated combined production and promotional cost of $362 million, the film needed to gross around $500 million worldwide in order to break even.

In the United States and Canada, Jungle Cruise was released alongside Stillwater and The Green Knight. It was projected to gross around $25 million from 4,310 theaters. The film made $13.4 million on its first day, including $2.7 million from Thursday night previews. It went on to slightly over-perform, debuting at $35 million to top the box office. The opening was met with a polarized response from industry insiders with some noting the film managed to finish above projections while others blamed the pandemic and simultaneous digital release for eating into possible grosses with one financial insider telling Deadline Hollywood that "the model diminishes the aggregate streaming revenue as well as cuts into a movie's theatrical gross." In its second weekend, the film fell 55% to $15.7 million, finishing second behind newcomer The Suicide Squad. The film made $9 million in its third weekend, $6.2 million in its fourth, and $5 million in its fifth.

In other territories, the film debuted at $27.6 million from 47 markets, below its $40 million projections. Its largest markets were the UK ($3.2 million), France ($1.6 million), and South Korea ($1.2 million). In its second weekend, the film made $15.1 million from 49 markets, with the top running-totals being from the UK ($8.5 million), Russia ($5.9 million), France ($4.2 million), Japan ($4 million), and Saudi Arabia ($2.7 million). In China it earned $3.3 million during its debut weekend, ranking fifth on the box office charts. This was considered a disappointing opening by media outlets. In the following weekend, it fell to the seventh rank.

=== Critical response ===
On the review aggregator website Rotten Tomatoes, 62% of 348 critics' reviews are positive, with an average rating of 5.90/10. The website's consensus reads: "Its craft isn't quite as sturdy as some of the classic adventures it's indebted to, but Jungle Cruise remains a fun, family-friendly voyage." Metacritic, which uses a weighted average, assigned the film a score of 50 out of 100, based on 52 critics, indicating "mixed or average" reviews. Audiences polled by CinemaScore gave the film an average grade of "A−" on an A+ to F scale, while PostTrak reported that 80% of audience members gave it a positive score, with 60% saying they would definitely recommend it.

Writing for Variety, Owen Gleiberman praised Johnson and Blunt's chemistry and said that the film is "a little good old-fashioned" and it "pelts the audience with entertainment in such a lively yet bumptious way that at times you may wish you were wearing protective gear". Korey Coleman and Martin Thomas of Double Toasted both gave it a relatively positive review; even going so far as to predict that other critics would negatively critique it simply because of its premise. However, they were both split on the portrayal of Jack Whitehall's character; while Thomas found it as a positive step forward for LGBT characters, Coleman found it somewhat campy and unnecessary. Brian Truitt of USA Today stated that "while those parents who grew up with Indy and Romancing the Stone might have seen a lot of this stuff before, it's right in the wheelhouse for movie-loving youngsters not quite ready to watch Nazis' faces melt in Raiders. For those kiddos, Johnson's big lug and Blunt's eager explorer offer an enjoyable welcome to the Jungle."

Rolling Stone reviewer David Fear gave the film 2.5/5 stars and called it an "attempt to sell the Magic Kingdom's vintage" boat ride as "the next big endless-summer-movie thing", adding that "Blunt's tart apple crisp of a comic performance pairs nicely with Johnson's beefcake served with a side of ham." In The New York Times, Jeannette Catsoulis wrote a negative review that the film is a "soggy mess" with a "mostly unintelligible" plot, adding that it "exhibits a blatantly faux exoticism that feels as flat as the forced frisson between its two leads". Writing for ABC News, reviewer Peter Travers commented that "made up of spare parts from better movies and at over two-hours in length", the film will be "tough on short attention spans"; however, he added that it is "better than Haunted Mansion and Tomorrowland", other films based on Disney rides.

=== Accolades ===
Award	Date of ceremony	Category	Recipient(s)	Result	Ref.
People's Choice Awards	December 7, 2021	The Comedy Movie of 2021	Jungle Cruise	Nominated	
People's Choice Awards	December 7, 2021	The Male Movie Star of 2021	Dwayne Johnson	Won	
People's Choice Awards	December 7, 2021	The Comedy Movie Star of 2021	Dwayne Johnson	Won	
People's Choice Awards	December 7, 2021	The Comedy Movie Star of 2021	Emily Blunt	Nominated	
AACTA Awards	December 8, 2021	Best Visual Effects or Animation	Rising Sun Pictures	Nominated	
Visual Effects Society Awards	March 8, 2022	Outstanding Animated Character in a Photoreal Feature	Alexander Lee, Claus Pedersen, Rasely Ma, Gary Wu (for Aguirre)	Nominated	
Visual Effects Society Awards	March 8, 2022	Outstanding Created Environment in a Photoreal Feature	Mark McNicholl, Frédéric Valleur, Hamish Beachman, Mark Wainwright (for Waterfall Canyon)	Nominated	
Visual Effects Society Awards	March 8, 2022	Outstanding Special (Practical) Effects in a Photoreal or Animated Project	JD Schwalm, Nick Rand, Robert Spurlock, Nick Byrd	Won	
Critics' Choice Super Awards	March 17, 2022	Best Actor in an Action Movie	Dwayne Johnson	Nominated	
Nickelodeon Kids' Choice Awards	April 9, 2022	Favorite Movie	Jungle Cruise	Nominated	
Nickelodeon Kids' Choice Awards	April 9, 2022	Favorite Movie Actor	Dwayne Johnson	Nominated	
Nickelodeon Kids' Choice Awards	April 9, 2022	Favorite Movie Actress	Emily Blunt	Nominated	
BMI Film & TV Awards	May 11, 2022	BMI Theatrical Film Awards	James Newton Howard	Won	
Golden Trailer Awards	October 7, 2022	Best Digital - Fantasy Adventure	Jungle Cruise	Won	

== Scrapped sequel ==
After the opening weekend of Jungle Cruise, Johnson announced that discussions were underway with Walt Disney Pictures for a sequel.

In November 2025, Johnson and Blunt stated that a Jungle Cruise sequel was not going to happen. Johnson explained, "I think when Disney came under new leadership, they just shifted coming out of COVID. COVID shifted our business in a lot of ways. I think they looked at that property and thought, we did it once, not sure if we should revisit it again."

== See also ==
- List of film adaptations of Disney attractions
