= Sterling K. Brown =

American actor (born 1976)

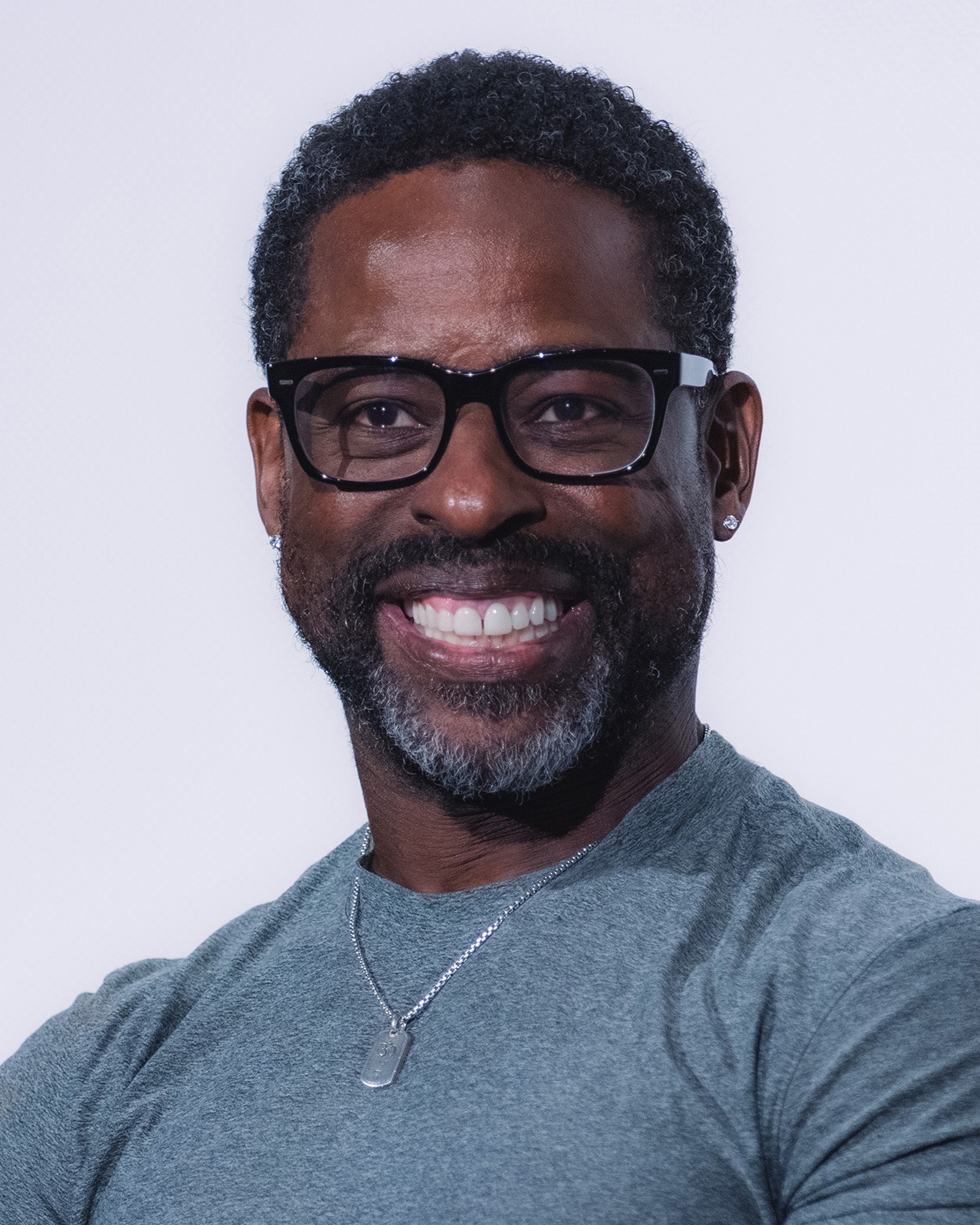
- Brown in 2026
- Born: Sterling Kelby Brown; April 5, 1976 (age 50); St. Louis, Missouri, U.S.
- Education: Stanford University (BA); New York University (MFA)
- Occupation: Actor
- Years active: 2001–present
- Spouse: Ryan Michelle Bathe (m. 2006)
- Children: 2
- Awards: Full list

Sterling Kelby Brown (born April 5, 1976) is an American actor. He has received numerous accolades including three Primetime Emmy Awards and a Golden Globe Award as well as a nomination for an Academy Award. He was included in Time's list of the 100 most influential people in the world in 2018.

Brown portrayed Christopher Darden in the FX limited series The People v. O. J. Simpson: American Crime Story (2016) earning the Primetime Emmy Award for Outstanding Supporting Actor in a Limited Series or Movie. For his role as Randall Pearson in the NBC drama series This Is Us (2016–2022) he earned the Primetime Emmy Award for Outstanding Lead Actor in a Drama Series in 2017. He has also starred in the Amazon Prime Video comedy series The Marvelous Mrs. Maisel (2019) and the Hulu thriller series Paradise (2025–present).

For his role in American Fiction (2023), he was nominated for the Academy Award for Best Supporting Actor. Brown had leading roles in films such as Hotel Artemis (2019), Honk for Jesus. Save Your Soul. (2022), and Biosphere (2023); supporting roles in Marshall (2017), Black Panther (2018), and Waves (2019); and voice roles such as The Angry Birds Movie 2 (2019) and Frozen 2 (2019).

== Early life and education ==
Brown was born in St. Louis, Missouri, to Sterling Brown and Aralean (née Banks) Brown. He has two sisters and two brothers. His father died when he was 10 years old.

As a child, he went by the name Kelby; when he turned 16, he adopted the name Sterling, explaining in 2016:

I went by Kelby. My mom tells me this story — she was reiterating it the other day — in kindergarten I came home one day and said, 'Mom, Sterling is eight letters and Kelby is five. I'll just do Kelby and then when I turn 16, I will go by Sterling.' And I don't remember that. The impetus for me is that he had been gone for some time, and I was like, 'Kelby was a little boy's name.' I felt like I was ready to become Sterling.

Brown grew up in Olivette, Missouri, a suburb of St. Louis. He attended the private Mary Institute and St. Louis Country Day School.

He graduated from Stanford University in 1998 with an acting degree. He had initially majored in economics with a focus on business, planning on going into investment banking, but after finding his internship at the Federal Reserve to be a crashing bore and falling in love with acting as a freshman, he switched his major and career trajectory. He completed his Masters at New York University Tisch School of the Arts, where he graduated with an MFA.

== Career ==
=== 2002–2015: Early career ===
After college, Brown performed a series of roles in regional theater. In the theater, Brown was cast in the 2002 production of Bertolt Brecht's The Resistible Rise of Arturo Ui starring Al Pacino, Paul Giamatti, Steve Buscemi, John Goodman and Jacqueline McKenzie at the National Actors Theater. That same year he played the sea captain Antonio in The Public Theater's revival of the William Shakespeare play Twelfth Night at the Delacorte Theatre. He acted alongside Zach Braff, Julia Stiles, David Harbour, Natalie Gold, Oliver Platt, and Christopher Lloyd.

He has also appeared on numerous television shows, including ER, NYPD Blue, JAG, Boston Legal, Alias, Without a Trace, and Third Watch. He was a regular in the comedy Starved, and has also appeared in numerous films, including Brown Sugar (2002) with Taye Diggs, Stay (2005) with Ewan McGregor, and Trust the Man (2005) with David Duchovny and Julianne Moore. He had a recurring role on the television series Supernatural, as vampire hunter Gordon Walker.

In 2006, he played Macduff in The Public Theater's production of William Shakespeare's Macbeth at the Anspacher Theater. Brown acted opposite Liev Schreiber and Jennifer Ehle. From 2007 to 2013, he played Dr. Roland Burton on the Lifetime drama series Army Wives. In 2009, he acted in the Tarell Alvin McCraney play The Brother/Sister Plays at The Public Theater. The production had two parts and was directed by Robert O'Hara featuring performances from Andre Holland and Brian Tyree Henry.

During this time, he guest starred in Eli Stone (2008), Medium (2010), The Good Wife (2011), and Masters of Sex (2014). He took the role as Detective Cal Beecher on Person of Interest from 2012 to 2013. In 2014, he starred as Hero in Suzan-Lori Parks's Odyssey-inspired play Father Comes Home From the Wars (Parts 1, 2, & 3) at New York's Public Theater.

=== 2016–2022: Breakthrough and This is Us ===
In 2016, he starred in the FX miniseries The People v. O. J. Simpson: American Crime Story as Christopher Darden, for which he won the Primetime Emmy Award for Outstanding Supporting Actor in a Limited Series or Movie at the 68th Primetime Emmy Awards. From 2016 to 2022, Brown had a starring role in the television series This Is Us, for which he won his second Primetime Emmy Award. In 2018, This Is Us made him the first African-American actor to win a Golden Globe in the Best Actor in a Television Drama category, and the first to win a Screen Actors Guild Award in the Outstanding Performance by a Male Actor in a Drama Series category. He also won, with the rest of the cast, the Screen Actors Guild Award for Outstanding Performance by an Ensemble in a Drama Series.

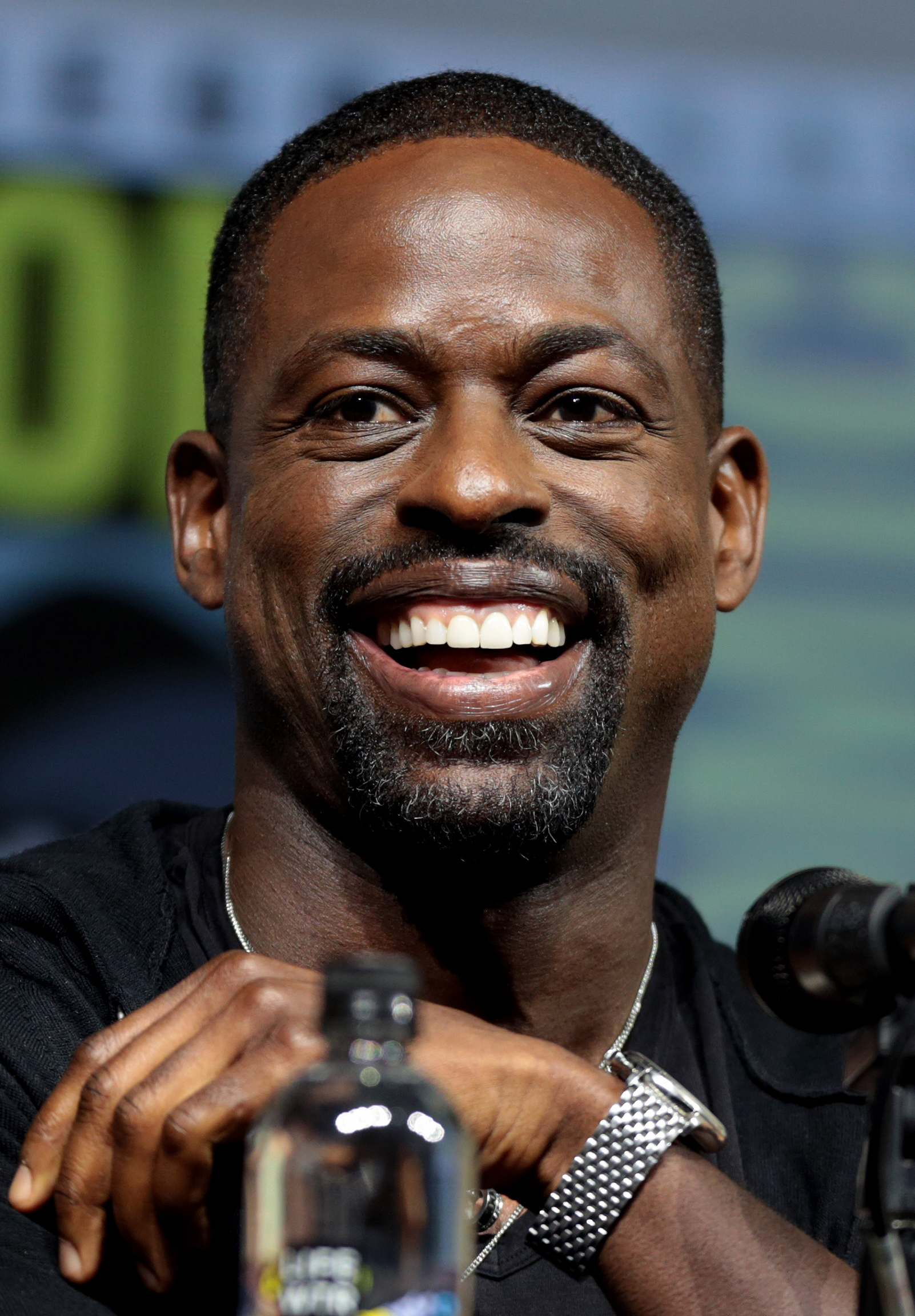
Brown at the 2018 San Diego Comic-Con

During this time, he had high-profile supporting roles in several feature films. Brown portrayed Joseph Spell in the historical drama Marshall (2017), N'Jobu in the Marvel Cinematic Universe film Black Panther (2018), and Ronald Williams in the A24 independent film Waves (2019). In June 2018, Brown gave the commencement address at his alma mater Stanford University. He appeared as a guest star in the NYPD sitcom Brooklyn Nine-Nine, and earned critical acclaim for his role as Philip Davidson, a dentist under investigation for murdering his business partner. He was nominated for a Primetime Emmy Award for Outstanding Guest Actor in a Comedy Series in 2018 for this performance. The following year he had a recurring role in the third season of The Marvelous Mrs. Maisel in 2019. He portrayed Reggie, the manager of the fictional singer Shy Baldwin (Leroy McClain). For his performance he received a Primetime Emmy Award for Outstanding Supporting Actor in a Comedy Series nomination. In August 2019, he was announced at D23 Expo and on Twitter as the voice of Lieutenant Destin Mattias in Frozen 2.

From 2019 to 2020, he narrated the Disney+ documentary series One Day at Disney. He portrayed Leo McGarry, replacing the late John Spencer in the HBO Max special A West Wing Special to Benefit When We All Vote (2020). Brown took a recurring voice role as Michael Angelo in the Netflix animated comedy series Big Mouth (2020). He continued playing voice roles in Hulu's animated science fiction series Solar Opposites and Apple TV+'s animated children's series Interrupting Chicken. In 2022, he starred in and produced the mockumentary comedy Honk for Jesus. Save Your Soul. acting opposite Regina Hall. The film premiered at the Sundance Film Festival, receiving positive reviews. Justin Chang of NPR wrote, "Brown and Hall give wonderfully complex performances as a disgraced Christian power couple trying to salvage what remains of their spiritual empire."

=== 2023–present: Continued prominence ===
In 2023, he acted alongside Mark Duplass in the science fiction comedy film Biosphere (2023), which premiered at the Toronto International Film Festival. That same year he played Randle P. McMurphy with Laura Benanti as Nurse Ratched for a reading for One Flew Over the Cuckoo's Nest. He gained critical acclaim for his supporting role in the satirical comedy American Fiction (2023) directed by Cord Jefferson starring Jeffrey Wright. Peter Debruge of Variety described Brown as a "scene-stealer" playing the protagonist's gay brother, a plastic surgeon. For his performance, he received a nomination for the Academy Award for Best Supporting Actor at the 96th Academy Awards. Wright was nominated for the Academy Award for Best Actor for American Fiction, and the nomination of Brown and Wright was the first time a Black lead actor and a Black supporting actor from the same film were both nominated for Academy Awards. In 2024, Brown joined the film Double Booked which will be directed by Adam Scott. He also took a supporting role in the Netflix science-fiction drama Atlas with Jennifer Lopez and Simu Liu.

== Personal life ==
Brown met actress Ryan Michelle Bathe as a college freshman at Stanford. They eloped in March 2006, but held a large ceremony in June 2007. They have two sons, Andrew and Amaré.

== Acting credits ==
Key
†	Denotes films that have not yet been released

=== Film ===
Year	Title	Role	Director	Notes
2002	Brown Sugar	Co-Worker	Rick Famuyiwa	
2005	Trust the Man	Rand	Bart Freundlich	
2005	Stay	Frederick / Devon	Marc Forster	
2008	Righteous Kill	IA Detective Rogers	Jon Avnet	
2011	Our Idiot Brother	Officer Omar Coleman	Jesse Peretz	
2013	The Suspect	The Other Suspect	Stuart Connelly	
2015	Mojave	Detective Fletcher	William Monahan	Uncredited
2016	Whiskey Tango Foxtrot	Sergeant Hurd	Glenn Ficarra & John Requa	
2016	Spaceman	Rodney Scott	Brett Rapkin	
2016	Split	Shaw	M. Night Shyamalan	Deleted scenes
2017	Marshall	Joseph Spell	Reginald Hudlin	
2018	Black Panther	N'Jobu	Ryan Coogler	
2018	Hotel Artemis	Sherman / Waikiki	Drew Pearce	
2018	The Predator	Agent Will Traeger	Shane Black	
2019	The Angry Birds Movie 2	Garry	Thurop Van Orman	Voice
2019	Waves	Ronald Williams	Trey Edward Shults	
2019	Frozen 2	Lieutenant Destin Mattias	Chris Buck & Jennifer Lee	Voice
2020	The Rhythm Section	Marc Serra	Reed Morano	
2022	Honk for Jesus. Save Your Soul.	Lee-Curtis Childs	Adamma Ebo	Also producer
2022	Biosphere	Ray	Mel Eslyn	
2023	American Fiction	Clifford "Cliff" Ellison	Cord Jefferson	
2024	Atlas	Colonel Elias Banks	Brad Peyton	
2025	Shadow Force	—N/a	Joe Carnahan	Producer only
2026	The Gallerist	Tom	Cathy Yan	
2026	Is God Is	Man	Aleshea Harris	
2027	Voltron †	Zarkon	Rawson Marshall Thurber	Post-production
2027	The Comebacker †		Marielle Heller	Post-production

=== Television ===
Year	Title	Role	Notes
2002–2004	Third Watch	Officer Edward Dade	9 episodes
2003	Hack	Rasheed Morgan	Episode: "Hidden Agenda"
2003	Tarzan	Detective Carey	2 episodes
2004	ER	Bob Harris	Episode: "Get Carter"
2004	NYPD Blue	Kelvin George	Episode: "Chatty Chatty Bang Bang"
2004	JAG	Sergeant Harry Smith	Episode: "Coming Home"
2005	Boston Legal	Zeke Borns	Episode: "Death Be Not Proud"
2005	Starved	Adam Williams	7 episodes
2006	Alias	Agent Rance	Episode: "There's Only One Sidney Bristow"
2006	Smith	Mr. Corey	Episode: "Three"
2006	Without a Trace	Thomas Biggs	Episode: "Watch Over Me"
2006–2007	Supernatural	Gordon Walker	4 episodes
2007	Shark	Quenton North	Episode: "Teacher's Pet"
2007	Standoff	Russell Marsh	Episode: "Lie to Me"
2007–2013	Army Wives	Roland Burton	107 episodes
2008	Eli Stone	David Mosley	Episode: "Patience"
2010	Medium	Todd Gillis	Episode: "The People in Your Neighborhood"
2011	Detroit 1-8-7	Cameron Jones	Episode: "Ice Man/Malibu"
2011	The Good Wife	Andrew Boylan	Episode: "Feeding the Rat"
2011	Harry's Law	Mr. Thomas	Episode: "American Girl"
2012	Nikita	Nick Anson	Episode: "True Believer"
2012–2013	Person of Interest	Detective Cal Beecher	6 episodes
2013	NCIS	Elijah Banner	Episode: "Devil's Triad"
2014	The Mentalist	Agent Higgins	Episode: "White Lines"
2014	Masters of Sex	Marcus	Episode: "Story of My Life"
2015	Castle	Ed Redley	Episode: "The Wrong Stuff"
2015	Criminal Minds	Fitz	Episode: "Beyond Borders"
2016	The People v. O. J. Simpson: American Crime Story	Christopher Darden	10 episodes
2016–2022	This Is Us	Randall Pearson	Main role
2017	Insecure	Lionel	2 episodes
2017	Running Wild with Bear Grylls	Himself	Episode: "Sterling K. Brown"
2018	Saturday Night Live	Himself (host)	Episode: "Sterling K. Brown/James Bay"
2018	Brooklyn Nine-Nine	Philip Davidson	Episode: "The Box"
2018	Black Love	Himself	2 episodes
2018	Robot Chicken	Various voices	Episode: "Shall I Visit the Dinosaurs?"
2019	The Unauthorized Bash Brothers Experience	Sia	TV special
2019	Sesame Street	Himself	Episode: "Sesame Street's 50th Anniversary Celebration"
2019	The Marvelous Mrs. Maisel	Reggie	4 episodes
2019–2020	One Day at Disney	Narrator	52 episodes
2020	Kipo and the Age of Wonderbeasts	Lio Oak	Voice, main role
2020	A West Wing Special to Benefit When We All Vote	Leo McGarry	Recreation of "Hartsfield's Landing"
2020	Big Mouth	Michael Angelo	Voice, recurring role (season 4)
2021–2022	Solar Opposites	Halk	Voice, 10 episodes
2022–2023	Interrupting Chicken	Papa	Voice, 12 episodes
2023–present	Invincible	Angstrom Levy	Voice, 9 episodes
2025–present	Paradise	Xavier Collins	Main role, also executive producer
2025	Washington Black	Medwin Harris	Main role, also executive producer

=== Theater ===
Year	Show	Role	Playwright	Theater	Ref.
2002	Twelfth Night	Antonio	William Shakespeare	Public Theater Delacorte Theater	
2002	The Resistible Rise of Arturo Ui	Goodwill	Bertolt Brecht	National Actor's Theatre	
2006	Macbeth	Macduff	William Shakespeare	Public Theater Delacorte Theater	
2009	The Brother/Sister Plays Part 1 & 2	Shango / Shua	Tarell Alvin McCraney	Public Theater Anspacher Theater	
2014	Father Comes Home From the Wars (Parts 1, 2, & 3)	Hero/Ulysses	Suzan-Lori Parks	Public Theater Anspacher Theater	

=== Music videos ===
Year	Artist	Title	Role	Ref.
2019	The Lonely Island (feat. Sia)	"Oakland Nights"	Sia	

== Awards and nominations ==
Brown has won 24 awards from 91 nominations.

Brown has won three Primetime Emmy Awards. In 2016, he earned his first Primetime Emmy Award for Outstanding Supporting Actor in a Limited Series or Movie for his breakout portrayal of attorney Christopher Darden in The People v. O. J. Simpson: American Crime Story. Brown also won a Critics' Choice TV Award, along with Golden Globe Award, Screen Actors Guild Award, and NAACP Image Award nominations.

In 2023, Brown delivered the commencement speech for the graduating class at Washington University in St. Louis and received an honorary Doctor of Fine Arts degree from the university.
