= The Liberator (film) =

2013 film

- Film poster
- Directed by: Alberto Arvelo
- Written by: Timothy J. Sexton
- Starring: Édgar Ramírez; María Valverde; Erich Wildpret; Iwan Rheon; Orlando Valenzuela; Juana Acosta; Manuel Porto; Alejandro Furth; Imanol Arias; Danny Huston
- Cinematography: Xavi Giménez
- Music by: Gustavo Dudamel
- Distributed by: Cohen Media Group
- Release dates: 9 September 2013 (TIFF); 24 July 2014 (Venezuela)
- Running time: 119 minutes
- Countries: Venezuela; Spain
- Languages: Spanish; English; French
- Box office: $1.5 million (US)

The Liberator (Spanish: Libertador) is a 2013 Spanish–Venezuelan historical drama film directed by Alberto Arvelo, starring Édgar Ramírez as Simón Bolívar. It was screened in the Special Presentation section at the 2013 Toronto International Film Festival. It was selected as the Venezuelan entry for the Best Foreign Language Film at the 87th Academy Awards, making the January Shortlist.

== Plot ==
In the early 19th century, young Simón Bolívar, a Venezuelan aristocrat educated in Europe, lives a life of privilege among the colonial elite. His marriage to María Teresa del Toro deepens his happiness, but tragedy strikes when she dies of yellow fever soon after their return to Venezuela. Heartbroken, Bolívar turns away from wealth and comfort, growing increasingly aware of the oppression suffered by his people under Spanish rule.

Inspired by Enlightenment ideals and revolutionary movements in Europe, Bolívar vows to free his homeland. He joins other patriots in an armed rebellion against the Spanish Empire, enduring betrayal, exile, and defeat before rallying his forces again. With the support of Francisco de Miranda and Antonio José de Sucre, he launches a daring military campaign across the Andes—one of the most remarkable marches in history—to liberate New Granada (modern-day Colombia).

Bolívar’s victories make him a symbol of hope, and he becomes known as “El Libertador.” He dreams of uniting the newly freed territories into a single nation, Gran Colombia, stretching from Venezuela to Peru. Yet as internal divisions, political rivalries, and foreign interference grow, his vision begins to crumble.

Haunted by the sacrifices made for independence and increasingly isolated, Bolívar faces conspiracies and assassination attempts. In his final days, betrayed by many of his allies, he reflects on the fragility of freedom and the cost of revolution. The film closes with his death in exile in 1830, as his dream of a united South America fades—but his legacy as the Liberator endures.

== Cast ==
- Édgar Ramírez as Simón Bolívar
- María Valverde as Maria Teresa Rodríguez del Toro
- Juana Acosta as Manuela Sáenz
- Danny Huston as Martin Torkington
- Erich Wildpret as Antonio José de Sucre
- Alejandro Furth as Rafael Urdaneta
- Orlando Valenzuela as Francisco de Paula Santander
- Iwan Rheon as Daniel O'Leary
- Gary Lewis as James Rooke
- Imanol Arias as Juan Domingo Monteverde
- Juvel Vielma as José Antonio Páez
- Carlos Julio Molina as José Félix Ribas
- Manuel Porto as Francisco de Miranda
- Francisco Denis as Simón Rodríguez
- Zenaida Gamboa as Hipólita
- Andrés Gertrúdix as Prince Fernando
- Elisa Sednaoui as Fanny du Villars
- Leandro Arvelo as Fernando Bolívar
- Ximo Solano as Francisco Vinoni
- Steve Wilcox as Black Horseman
- Eric Toala as Simón Bolívar (kid)

== Release ==
The film debuted on 9 September 2013 at the Toronto International Film Festival and opened in its home country of Venezuela on 24 July 2014. The film was released by Cohen Media Group on Blu-ray Disc and DVD on 10 March 2015.

== See also ==
- List of submissions to the 87th Academy Awards for Best Foreign Language Film
- List of Venezuelan submissions for the Academy Award for Best Foreign Language Film
