= Manuela Saenz, La Libertadora Del Libertador =

- Directed by: Diego Risquez
- Written by: Leonardo Padron
- Produced by: Pedro Mezquita
- Starring: Beatriz Valdes Erich Wildpret Mariano Alvarez Alejo Felipe Juan Carlos Alarcon Juan Manuel Montesinos Manuel Salazar Isabel Herrera Orlando Urdaneta
- Cinematography: Leonardo Henriquez
- Edited by: Cesar Jarowski
- Music by: Eduardo Marturet
- Release date: December 2000
- Country: Venezuela
- Language: Spanish

Manuela Saenz is a historical biography movie directed by Diego Risquez, with a script by Leonardo Padron. It stars Beatriz Valdés in the title role, alongside Mariano Álvarez as the liberator Simón Bolívar. Other main cast members include Erich Wildpret, Juan Carlos Alarcón, Orlando Urdaneta, Manuel Salazar, Alejo Felipe, and Juan Manuel Montesinos.

The movie premiered in Venezuela in December of 2000 and had a special screening in the city of Washington in January 2001.

In 2003, the movie was released in France, specifically at the Biarritz Film Festival.

In 2006, the movie was broadcast on the Venezuelan channel Venemovies, a subsidiary of the Venezuelan broadcasting service Venevision.

== Plot ==
In 1856, a whaler arrives in Paita, Peru; on board is Herman Melville, who is astonished to learn that Manuela Sáenz, for eight years the lover of Simon Bolivar, is still alive. He calls on her, and although she will not talk to him about her life, his visit sends her to her chest of Bolivar's letters. As she reads them, the sepia-toned present gives way to flashbacks in color: she meets 'the Liberator' in 1822, becomes his lover, and also becomes a colonel in his military movement to realize the 'Gran Colombia', one nation across South America. As plague (brought by the ship) closes in on Manuela's household, so does her tempestuous story move toward Bolivar's betrayal and death

== Cast ==
- Beatriz Valdes as Manuela Saenz
- Mariano Alvarez as Simon Bolivar
- Erich Wildpret as Hernan Melville
- Juan Carlos Alarcon as Jose Maria Sanz
- Alejo Felipe as Vicente Ayuso
- Asdrubal Melendez as General Anastasio Bustamante
- Juan Manuel Montesinos as Jose la Mar
- Isabel Herrera as Natividad
- Manuel Salazar as Agustin Gamarra
- Orlando Urdaneta as Simon Rodriguez

== Reception ==
The movie currently has a score of 6.5/10 on the cinema website IMDb.

According the movie website page “ El espectador Imaginario” one of the best elements in the film are the dramatic scenes. The principal lead cast have good chemistry and retells the history of love between Simon Bolivar and Manuelita Saenz. One lacks aspect its the scenes of battles to shorts and very low budget for recreate.
