= Édgar Ramírez =

Venezuelan actor (born 1977)

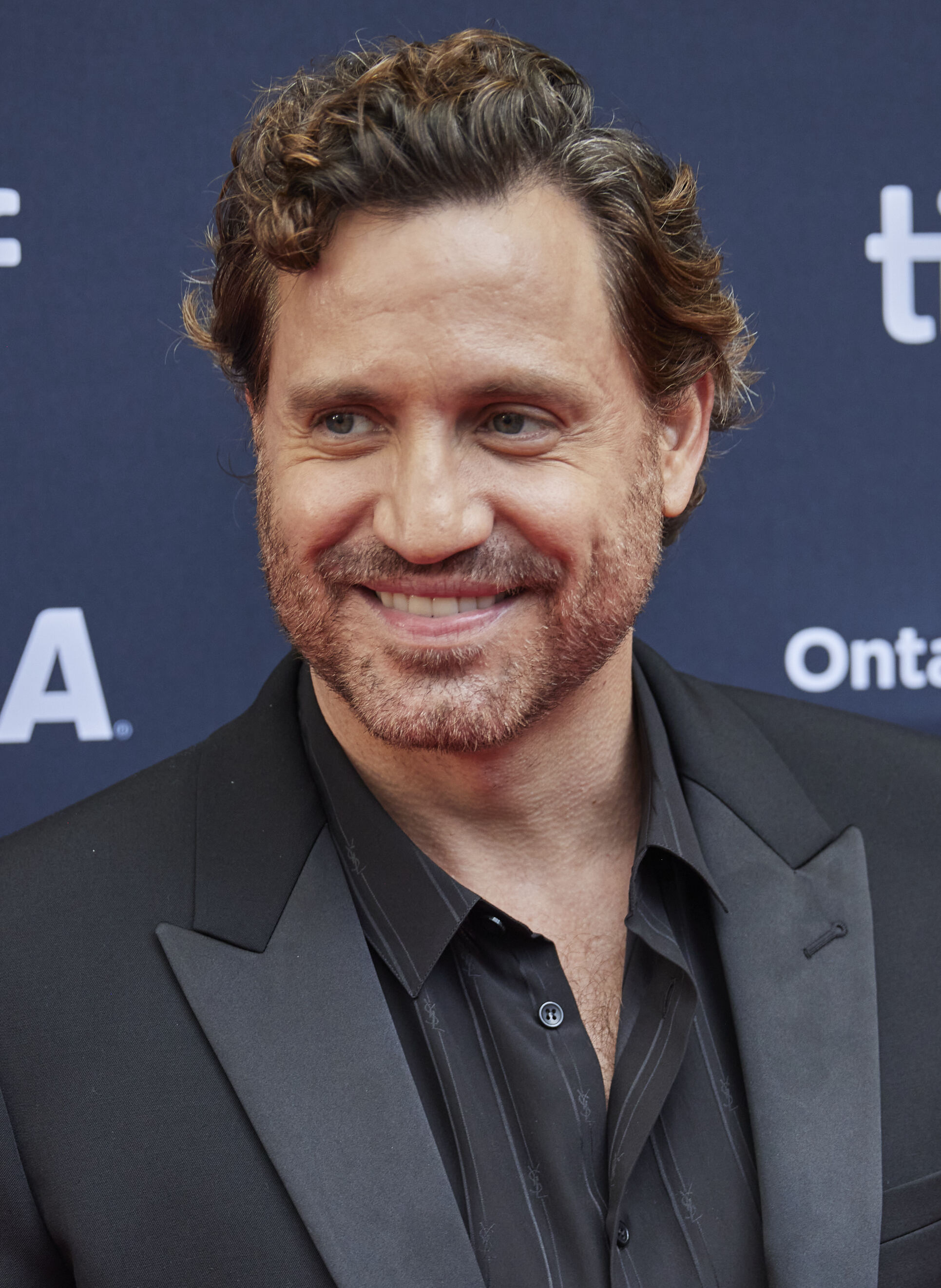
- Ramírez at the 2024 Toronto International Film Festival
- Born: Édgar Filiberto Ramírez Arellano; 25 March 1977 (age 49); San Cristóbal, Táchira, Venezuela
- Occupation: Actor
- Years active: 2003–present

Édgar Filiberto Ramírez Arellano (Spanish pronunciation: [ˈeðɣaɾ raˈmiɾes], born 25 March 1977) is a Venezuelan actor.

After studying communications at the Andrés Bello Catholic University, Ramírez worked in media and considered becoming a diplomat. When filmmaker Guillermo Arriaga praised a short film he had done, he decided to pursue his performing hobby as a career.

Ramírez played a CIA assassin in the action-thriller film The Bourne Ultimatum (2007). His portrayal of Carlos the Jackal in the 2010 biopic television miniseries Carlos won him the César Award for Most Promising Actor, and nominations for a Golden Globe and Emmy Award for Best Actor. He then played a CIA operative in the film Zero Dark Thirty (2012), and boxer Roberto Durán in the biographical sports film Hands of Stone (2016).

Ramírez received several accolades for his portrayal of Gianni Versace in the 2018 miniseries The Assassination of Gianni Versace: American Crime Story. In 2020, he had a recurring role in the HBO miniseries The Undoing. In 2022, Ramírez was part of the Un Certain Regard jury at the Cannes Film Festival.

== Early life ==
Ramírez was born in San Cristóbal, Táchira, Venezuela, the son of Soday Arellano, an attorney, and Filiberto Ramírez, a military officer. He has a sister named Nataly and a niece and nephew named Enrique and Maria Camilla. Part of his childhood was spent traveling in different countries; he speaks Spanish, English, French, Italian and German fluently.

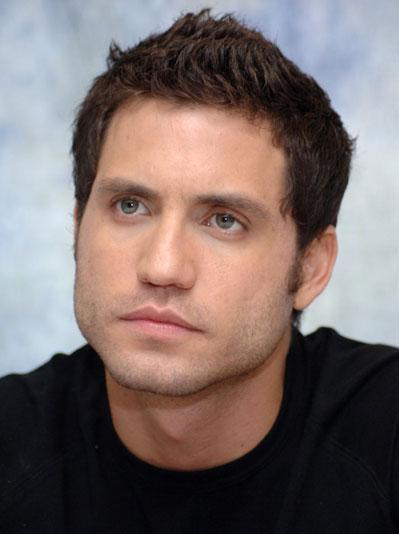
Ramírez in 2005

Ramírez graduated in 1999 from the Andrés Bello Catholic University in Caracas with a degree in mass communication, minoring in audiovisual communications, although he intended to pursue international relations. While in college he worked as an emerging journalist, reporting on politics. Later, he became executive director of Dale al Voto, a Venezuelan foundation. He and his team created campaigns for radio, television and movie theaters. However, he was always attracted to the performing arts and while in college was involved with the arts. Ramírez was in charge of international promotions of the Viart Film Festival. "I'll be lying if I told you I dreamed about becoming an actor as a kid. But I wasn't in any different to the world of performing arts. I was always very attracted to it. I just never thought about it as a career." Ramírez passed it up, as he was in the middle of his thesis and was to attend Harvard National Model UN that year as a delegate from his school. Ramírez then decided to pursue his acting interests.

== Acting career ==
Ramirez's first recognition as an actor was the successful soap opera Cosita rica, for Venevisión which aired from September 2003 to August 2004, lasting 270 episodes. In 2005, he made his major motion-picture début playing Choco, Domino Harvey's love interest in the film Domino directed by Tony Scott.

This would be followed by Cyrano Fernandez, with Ramírez in the title role, and then Vantage Point, directed by Pete Travis. In the latter high-budgeted Sony Pictures political thriller, Ramírez joined an all-star international cast including Dennis Quaid, Matthew Fox, William Hurt, Forest Whitaker, Eduardo Noriega, and Ayelet Zurer. Ramírez plays Javier, an ex-special forces soldier forced to kidnap the American President in order to get his brother back.

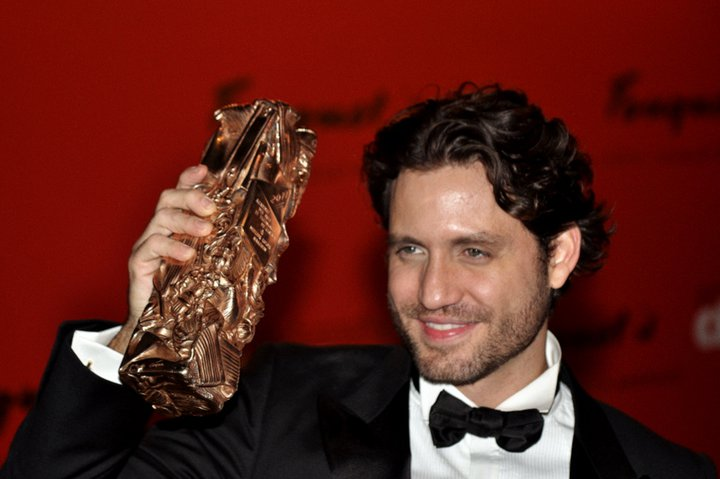
Ramírez at the 2011 César Awards

Ramírez has since appeared in several other productions. Among those are the first part of the two film bundle Che by Steven Soderbergh, where he played the role of Ciro Redondo (a Cuban revolutionary who fought with Ché Guevara), La Hora Cero (The Magic Hour), a short film directed by Guillermo Arriaga; Plan B, directed by Alejandro García Wiederman (Venezuela); Yotama se va volando (Yotama Flies Away), directed by Luis Armando Roche (Venezuela-France); Punto y raya (Step Forward), directed by Elia K. Schneider (Venezuela-Spain-Chile-Uruguay), submitted by Venezuela for Oscar consideration for 2004 Best Foreign Film, in which he played Colombian soldier Pedro.

In 2007, he played the role of Paz, a Blackbriar assassin, in The Bourne Ultimatum; in its source novel The Bourne Ultimatum, the villain is Ilich Ramírez Sánchez, a.k.a. Carlos the Jackal. Ramírez went on to play the role of the actual Carlos in the 2010 French-German limited series Carlos. At the French César Awards 2011, he was awarded, for the film version of the TV series, the César Award for Most Promising Actor. Ramírez has also given his voice to language learning education, guest-starring on the audio CD supplement to the Fluenz Spanish 1 DVD software.

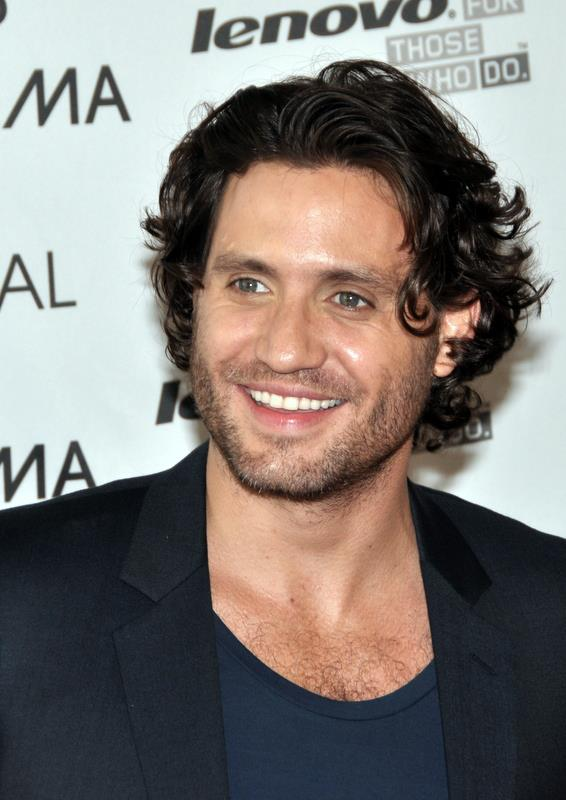
Ramírez in 2012

Ramírez appeared in the Clash of the Titans (2010) sequel, Wrath of the Titans (2012), playing Ares, the God of War. In 2012, he played Larry in the Kathryn Bigelow film Zero Dark Thirty. He played Bodhi in the 2015 remake of Point Break. In 2016, he played Dr. Kamal Abdic in the film The Girl on the Train.

In 2017, Ramírez played Gianni Versace in the second season of the anthology series American Crime Story. In 2019, Ramírez joined the cast of the spy thriller film The 355, which was released in 2022 and reunited him with ACS co-star Penélope Cruz.

== Philanthropy ==
Ramírez supports the campaign "No Dispares" (Don't Shoot), by Amnesty International, the international human-rights organization. The campaign's purpose is to eliminate the number of injuries and deaths caused by the irresponsible use of guns.

Ramírez was also part of "5 Senses in Action", an organization which benefits children with special needs. On 13 July 2008, he took part in an outdoor activity that stimulated sensory experience through gestures, playing and singing for congenitally deaf and/or blind children.

== Personal life ==
On 18 November 2016, Hollywood Reporter interviewed Ramírez about his stolen watches. Thieves broke into Ramírez's apartment in Caracas and stole his watch collection including a Chanel J12 Chromatic titanium ceramic watch; a Cartier Santos; a TAG Heuer Aquaracer, a Montblanc TimeWalker Chronograph. Other watches in his collection are the Cartier Drive; a Montblanc "Homage to Nicolas Rieussec"; and the Harmony and Patrimony timepieces, both by Vacheron Constantin all worth about $150,000.

== Filmography ==
=== Film ===
Year	Film	Role	Notes	Ref.
2003	Yotama se va volando	Manuel Zozaya		
2004	Punto y Raya	Pedro		
2005	Atenea y Afrodita	Boyfriend	Short film	
2005	Domino	Choco		
2006	El Don	Alvaro		
2006	Elipsis	Sebastián Castillo		
2007	The Bourne Ultimatum	Paz		
2008	Che	Ciro Redondo García		
2008	Cyrano Fernandez	Cyrano		
2008	Vantage Point	Javier		
2010	Carlos	Carlos the Jackal	César Award for Most Promising Actor; Nominated—Golden Globe Award for Best Actor – Miniseries or Television Film; Nominated—London Film Critics Circle Award for Actor of the Year; Runner-Up—Los Angeles Film Critics Association Award for Best Actor; Nominated—Online Film Critics Society Award for Best Actor; Nominated—Primetime Emmy Award for Outstanding Lead Actor in a Miniseries or a Movie; Nominated—Screen Actors Guild Award for Outstanding Performance by a Male Actor in a Miniseries or Television Movie; Monte-Carlo Television Festival—Best Male Actor in a Miniseries or Television Movie	
2011	Saluda al Diablo de mi Parte	Ángel		
2012	Wrath of the Titans	Ares		
2012	An Open Heart	Javier		
2012	Zero Dark Thirty	Larry		
2013	The Counselor	The Priest		
2014	The Libertador	Simón Bolívar		
2014	Deliver Us from Evil	Mendoza		
2015	Joy	Tony Miranne		
2015	Point Break	"Bodhi"		
2016	Hands of Stone	Roberto "Hands of Stone" Durán		
2016	The Girl on the Train	Dr. Kamal Abdic		
2016	Gold	Michael Acosta		
2017	Bright	Kandomere		
2018	Furlough	Kevin Rivera		
2018	La quietud	Vincent		
2019	Wasp Network	René Gonzalez		
2020	Resistance	Sigmund		
2020	The Last Days of American Crime	Graham Bricke		
2021	Yes Day	Carlos Torres		
2021	Jungle Cruise	Aguirre		
2022	The 355	Luis Rojas		
2024	Emilia Pérez	Gustavo Brun		
2024	Borderlands	Atlas		
2025	It Would Be Night in Caracas	TBA		
2026	Next Life	Diego		
2026	Place to Be	TBA		
2026	Baton	TBA	Post-production	

=== Television ===
Year	Title	Role	Notes	Ref.
2003	Cosita Rica	Cacique Chacón	4 episodes	
2005	Ser bonita no basta	Leonardo	Episode: "#1.1"	
2018	The Assassination of Gianni Versace: American Crime Story	Gianni Versace	6 episodes Satellite Award for Best Cast – Television Series; Nominated—Golden Globe Award for Best Supporting Actor – Series, Miniseries or Television Film; Nominated—Primetime Emmy Award for Outstanding Supporting Actor in a Limited Series or Movie; Nominated—Satellite Award for Best Supporting Actor – Series, Miniseries or Television Film	
2020	The Undoing	Detective Joe Mendoza	Miniseries	
2023	Florida Man	Mike Valentine	Miniseries	
2023	Wolf Like Me	Anton	2 Episodes	
2023	Dr. Death	Paolo Macchiarini	Lead role, season 2	

=== Music videos ===
Year	Song title	Album	Artist	Ref.
2017	"Desencuentro"	Residente	Residente	
2017	"Mis Ilusiones"	San Luis	SanLuis	

== See also ==
- Notable AFS exchange students
