= Jezabel (2022 film) =

- Directed by: Hernan Jabes
- Written by: Hernan Jabes, Eduardo Gomez Rugueles
- Produced by: Adrian Geyer
- Starring: Erich Wildpret Gabriel Aguero Maria Conchita Alonso Cesar Cova Jhoanna Juliette Eliane Chiape
- Edited by: Adrian Geyer.
- Production company: 59 producciones
- Release date: 2022
- Countries: Venezuela, Mexico
- Language: Spanish

Jezabel is a Venezuelan-Mexican movie starring Gabriel Aguero, Eliane Chiape, Jhoana Juliette, Diana Volpe, Erich Wildpret, and Giovanni Garcia. It is based on the novel by Eduardo Sanchez Rugueles (who also penned the script) and directed by Hernan Jabes.

The movie is about four upper class friends living in Caracas, Venezuela, between 2017 and 2031 whose lives are impacted by a great tragedy.

The movie had an international release in the Miami international film Festival and a domestic release in Venezuela by the streaming plataform Go.

== Plot ==
Four upper-class high school students live carefree between drugs, games and love until one of the girls, Eli, is brutally killed. Sixteen years later, the memory of the crime torments Alain, another member of the group.

== Cast ==
- Gabriel Aguero
- Erich Wildpret
- Eliane Chiape
- Jhoana Juliette
- Giovanni Garcia
- Maria Conchita Alonso
- Hector Manrique

== Production ==
The film began production in the middle of 2020.

The movie was shooting in two separate ways. This was in part for make agreement with a producer company in Mexico to get funds for completing the shoot. The main cast was picked by Jabes.

== Reception ==
The movie had a great review in platforms such as letterbocd. The three lead actresses won the best actress prize in the Venezuelan Film Festival of 2022.

Lead actor Gabriel Agüero won best actor at the Barcelona International Film Festival.

Jezabel was distributed in Germany and was a commercial success.
