= Elipsis (film) =

2006 Venezuelan film

- Film poster
- Directed by: Eduardo Arias-Nath
- Written by: Eduardo Arias-Nath
- Produced by: Eduardo Arias-Nath
- Production company: Anthropolitan Films
- Distributed by: 20th Century Fox
- Release date: 2006
- Country: Venezuela
- Language: Spanish

Elipsis is a 2006 Venezuelan film written, produced, and directed by Eduardo Arias-Nath. It is the first Venezuelan film produced and distributed by 20th Century Fox and its Latin American division.

== Plot ==
Ellipsis is a film of parallel and fragmented stories, linked by the relationship between the famous actor Sebastián Castillo (Edgar Ramírez) and the frustrated fashion designer Galo Vidal (Erich Wildpret), whose roles are reversed as a result of the decisions they make. Sebastián's life is now in chaos, while Galo's is a success. Their lives intersect again when Sebastián turns to Galo for help, and the two embark on a journey that will put their friendship and their lives at stake.

== Cast ==
- Erich Wildpret as Galo Vidal
- Edgar Ramirez as Sebastian Ramirez
- Rafael Uribe as Eugenio Palermo
- Seu Jorge as Coyote
- Ludwing Pineda as Vicente Mateo
- Marisa Roman
- Angerlica Aragon
- Gaby Espino as Leonora
- Dimas Gonzalez as Charlie

== Reception ==
Elipsis was the second high highest-grossing film in Venezuela in 2006, just after Francisco de Miranda.
