= The Zero Hour (2010 film) =

- Directed by: Diego Velasco
- Written by: Diego Velasco; Carolina Paiz
- Produced by: Rodolfo Cova; Carolina Paiz
- Starring: Zapata 666; Amanda Key
- Cinematography: Luis Otero Prada
- Edited by: Otto Scheuren
- Music by: Freddy Sheinfeld; Gabriel Velasco
- Release date: 8 October 2010
- Running time: 100 minutes
- Country: Venezuela
- Language: Spanish

The Zero Hour (Spanish: La hora cero) is a 2010 Venezuelan action film directed by Diego Velasco that takes place during a medical strike in Venezuela.

== Synopsis ==
In Caracas in 1996, a medical strike takes place. Parca (Zapata 666), a self-described Grim reaper and regular sicario, brings a pregnant injured woman (Amanda Key) to his gang; the locals are unsympathetic to the doctors' reasons for strike and kidnap a doctor (Erich Wildpret) from the picket line, but the child is born in the back of a car. Witnessing this, Parca becomes invested in helping the needy, holding-up a private hospital and taking hostages to release in return for treatment of those from the slums. Eventually, this violent scheme collapses on him and the people around him.

== Production ==
The production mimicked the story of the film, facing troubles involving the kidnap of three crew members, including its co-producer, director Velasco being held-up at gunpoint, and the assassination of an actor shortly before recording his parts. Despite the themes, a co-writer said that they "want viewers to digest and interpret the movie’s ideas, not to put ideas in their heads".

By 2016, it was the highest-grossing Venezuelan national film, getting $3.5 million in box office takings in Venezuela.

== Reception ==
The film was well-received in the Americas, both North and South. It was given as an example in the book The Precarious in the Cinemas of the Americas of a "socially-engaged thriller [...] that [makes] use of mainstream cinema techniques, such as MTV-style, fast-paced editing and the inclusion of violent scenes to call attention to the collective responsibility for social inequalities".

== Cast ==
- Zapata 666 - Parca
- Amanda Key - Lady Di (after Diana, Princess of Wales, but pronounced "Lady Dee")
- Erich Wildpret - Dr. Ricardo Cova
- Laureano Olivares - Buitre
- Marisa Román - Veronica Rojas
- Albi De Abreu - Jesus
- Rolando Padilla as mayor of Caracas
- Alejandro Furth as Journalist
- Steve Wilcox as policia gringo
- Antonio Cuevas as dotor

== Awards ==
The film won three international awards, "Best Action Sequence Martial Arts Feature" at the US Action On Film International Film Festival (2011); the Audience Choice award at the Jackson Crossroads Film Festival (2011); and the Best Film at the Los Angeles Latino International Film Festival (2011). It was also nominated for the Best Latin-American Film award at the Mexican Ariel Awards in 2012.
