= One Day at Disney Shorts =

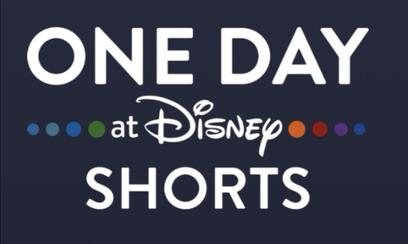
- Genre: Documentary
- Country of origin: United States
- No. of seasons: 1
- No. of episodes: 51

Production
- Executive producers: David Chamberlin; Michael Antinoro
- Producer: Victoria Chamlee
- Production companies: Disney Publishing Worldwide; Endeavor Content

Original release
- Network: Disney+
- Release: December 6, 2019 – present

One Day at Disney Shorts is an American documentary television series, composed of short episodes, produced by Disney Publishing Worldwide and Endeavor Content for Disney+. The series is a continuation of the documentary film One Day at Disney. The 51 short episodes, 5 to 7 minutes in length, were released weekly since its debut on December 6, 2019 until November 20, 2020.

== Premise ==
The documentary is a shorts series. Each episode follows on a different The Walt Disney Company employee's job.

== Episodes ==
No.	Name of the Employee	Role of the Employee	Division	Original release date
1	Eric Goldberg	Animator	Walt Disney Animation Studios	December 6, 2019
2	Thom Self	Mechanist and Scuba Diver	Disneyland	December 13, 2019
3	Sage Steele	SportsCenter News Anchor	ESPN	December 20, 2019
4	Katie Whetsell	Actress	Disney's Animal Kingdom	December 27, 2019
5	Bob Iger	CEO	The Walt Disney Company	January 3, 2020
6	Modern Family Cast	Actors and actresses	ABC	January 10, 2020
7	Jose Zelaya	Character designer	Disney Television Animation	January 17, 2020
8	Este Meza	Sr. Event Manager	Lucasfilm	January 24, 2020
9	Rob Richards	Organist	El Capitan Theatre	January 31, 2020
10	Grace Lee	Illustrator	Disney Publishing Worldwide	February 7, 2020
11	Kristina Dewberry	Construction manager	Walt Disney Imagineering	February 14, 2020
12	Vince Caro	Recording engineer	Pixar	February 21, 2020
13	Lupe de Santiago	Seamstress	Disneyland	February 28, 2020
14	Kris Becker	Zookeeper	Disney's Animal Kingdom	March 6, 2020
15	Leah Buono	Casting Director	Disney Channel	March 13, 2020
16	David Muir	News Anchor	ABC News	March 20, 2020
17	Morgan Rope	Research and Development Imagineer	Walt Disney Imagineering	March 27, 2020
18	Patti Murin	Actress	Disney Theatrical Productions	April 3, 2020
19	Francheska Roman	Candy making	Disneyland	April 10, 2020
20	Steve Sligh	Manager	Golden Oak Ranch	April 17, 2020
21	Tia Kratter	Manager of Art and Film Education	Pixar	April 24, 2020
22	Robin Roberts	News anchor	Good Morning America	May 1, 2020
23	Joe Hernandez	Attractions Host	Disneyland	May 8, 2020
24	Stephanie Carroll	Ranch hand	Tri Circle D Ranch	May 15, 2020
25	Ed Fritz	Engineer	Walt Disney Imagineering	May 22, 2020
26	Jerome Ranft	Sculptor	Pixar	May 29, 2020
27	George Montano	Plasterer	Disney Parks	June 5, 2020
28	Scot Drake	Creative Executive	Walt Disney Imagineering	June 12, 2020
29	Candice Valdez	Radio Disney Host	Radio Disney	June 19, 2020
30	Tony Salvaggio	Park Decorator	Disneyland	June 26, 2020
31	Zama Magudulela	Actress	Disney Theatrical Productions	July 3, 2020
32	Marc Smith	Story Artist	Walt Disney Animation Studios	July 10, 2020
33	Mike Davie	Project Manager	Walt Disney Imagineering	July 17, 2020
34	Chris Cristi	Helicopter Reporter	KABC-TV	July 24, 2020
35	Laura Cabo	Imagineering Creative Executive	Disney Cruise Line	July 31, 2020
36	Ryan Meinerding	Creative Director	Marvel Studios	August 7, 2020
37	Pavan Komkai	Broadcast Engineer	Walt Disney Direct-to-Consumer & International	August 14, 2020
38	Heather Bartleson	Holiday Services	Disney Parks	August 21, 2020
39	Eric Baker	Creative Director	Walt Disney Imagineering	August 28, 2020
40	Alice Taylor	StudioLAB	Walt Disney Studios	September 4, 2020
41	Amanda Lauder	Chief Chocolatier	Disney Springs	September 11, 2020
42	Natalie Mylniczenko	Veterinarian	Walt Disney World	September 18, 2020
43	Ashley Girdich	Research and Development Manager	Walt Disney Imagineering	September 25, 2020
44	Pablo Tufino	Ride Show Technician	Disney's Animal Kingdom	October 2, 2020
45	Gabriella Clarke	Creative Print Marketing	Walt Disney Studios	October 9, 2020
46	Alfredo Ayala	Research and Development Imagineer	Walt Disney Imagineering	October 16, 2020
47	Jason Benetti	Play by Play Commentator	ESPN	October 23, 2020
48	Dana Amendola	Vice President of Operations	Disney Theatrical Productions	October 30, 2020
49	Leslie Evans	Senior Research and Development Imagineer	Walt Disney Imagineering	November 6, 2020
50	Mark Gonzales	Steam Train Engineer	Disneyland	November 13, 2020
51	Season Finale	Everybody	The Walt Disney Company	November 20, 2020

== Release ==
One Day at Disney Shorts premiered on December 6, 2019.

== Reception ==
Joel Keller of Decider found One Day at Disney Shorts interesting among some of the stories it provides, stated it manages to be informative across its episodes, explaining it highlights the profession of various Disney employees, while claiming the series also serves as a promotional video for The Walt Disney Company. Emily Ashby of Common Sense Media rated the documentary 3 out of 5 stars, praised the series for its depiction of positive messages and role models, writing, "One Day at Disney is a docuseries that spotlights Disney employees to show how their creativity and vision bring the company's projects to life. [...] The content isn't a thrillfest, but the vignette format works to the advantage of tweens and teens who might want to see some of how the magic is made behind the scenes. What's more, the show inspires respect for a wide variety of careers and talent sets and demonstrates how teamwork and effective problem-solving are essential to Disney's success."
