= Boris Muñoz =

Venezuelan writer

Boris Muñoz (21 May 1969 in Caracas), is a Venezuelan journalist and author of several books, including "La ley de la calle, testimonios de jóvenes protagonistas de la violencia en Caracas" (Fundarte 1995), "Más allá de la ciudad letrada, Crónicas y espacios urbanos" (University of Pittsburgh Press) and "Despachos del imperio" (Random House 2007). Muñoz was Editor-in-chief of "Exceso" magazine. He contributes regularly to magazines and web supported media in Latin America.

Boris Muñoz is a fellow at the Nieman Foundation for Journalism at Harvard. He is a Ph.D in Hispanic American Literature from Rutgers University. Author of several books, including "La ley de la calle, testimonios de jóvenes protagonistas de la violencia en Caracas" (Fundarte, 1995) and "Despachos del imperio" (2008). He co-edited with Silvia Spitta "Más allá de la ciudad letrada, Crónicas y espacios urbanos" (University of Pittsburgh Press, 2003). In 2000 he received the Fellowship of the Humanities Institute at Dartmouth CollegeΩ and the First Accésit of the Premio Internacional de Periodismo Fernando Lázaro Carreter in Madrid.

He was and Editor-in-Chief of Nueva Sociedad and Editorial Director of "Exceso" magazine, and contributes regularly to "Gatopardo" magazine, and Prodavinci.com.
