= The Suspect (2013 American film) =

- Directed by: Stuart Connelly
- Written by: Stuart Connelly
- Produced by: Scott Aronson; Mary Jo Barthmaier; Robyn K. Bennett; Stuart Connelly
- Starring: Mekhi Phifer; William Sadler; Mary Jo Barthmaier
- Cinematography: Eric Giovon
- Edited by: Ray Chung
- Music by: Stephen Coates
- Production company: Modoc Spring
- Distributed by: One Village Entertainment; Image Entertainment; Just Bridge Entertainment; Sky Movies
- Release dates: October 16, 2013 (Norway); January 23, 2014 (United States)
- Running time: 98 minutes
- Country: United States
- Language: English

The Suspect is a 2013 film written and directed by Stuart Connelly. It stars Mekhi Phifer in the title role, and premiered at the 2013 American Black Film Festival. It was nominated for six awards.

== Main cast ==
- Mekhi Phifer as The Suspect
- William Sadler as Sheriff Dixon
- Sterling K. Brown as The Other Suspect
