= Josh Shipp =

Josh Shipp may refer to:

- Josh Shipp (basketball) (born 1986), American basketball player
- Josh Shipp (media personality) (born 1982), American motivation speaker and television personality
