= Dwayne Johnson =

American actor and professional wrestler (born 1972)

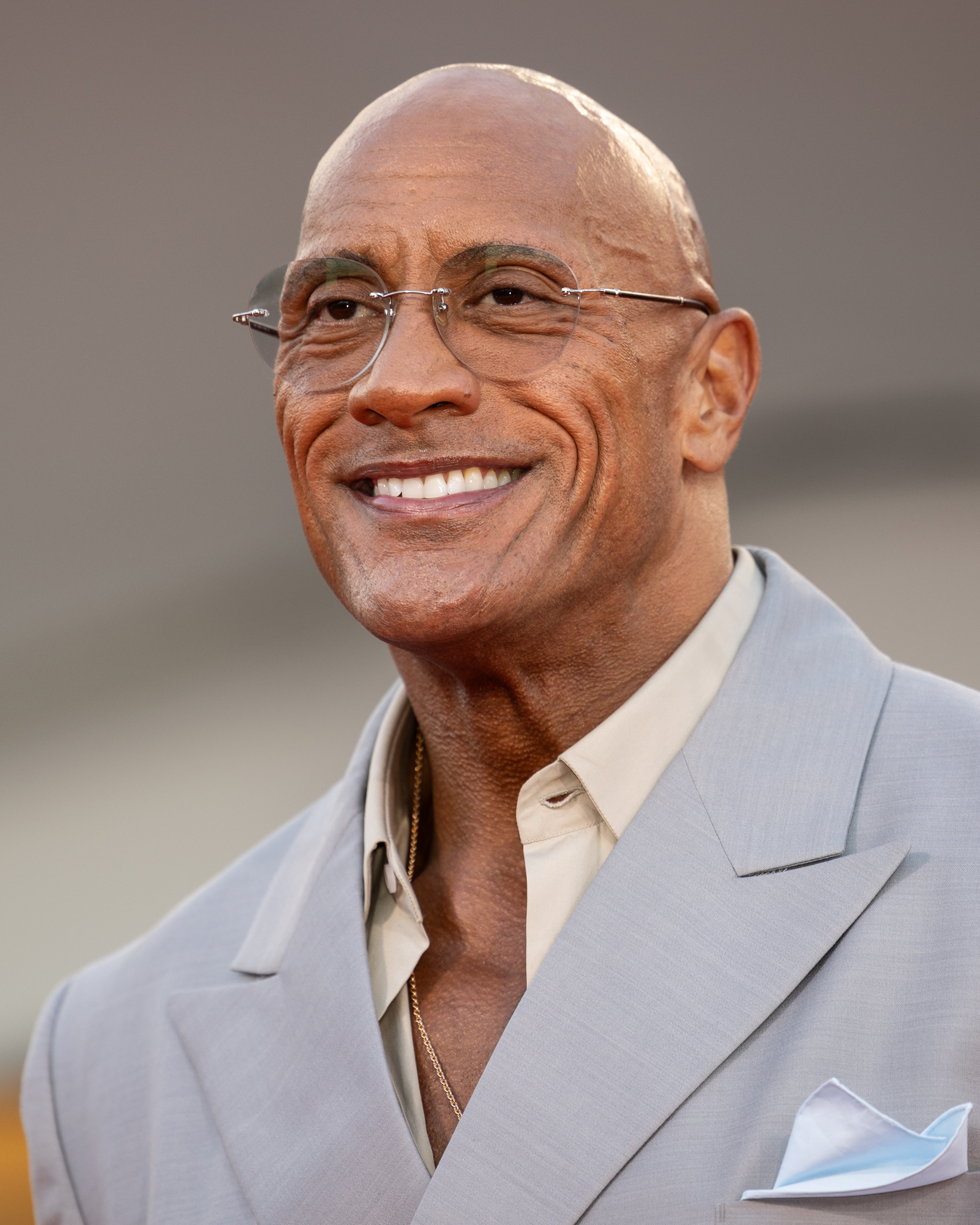
- Johnson in 2025
- Born: Dwayne Douglas Johnson; May 2, 1972 (age 54); Hayward, California, U.S.
- Other name: Dwayne "The Rock" Johnson
- Citizenship: United States; Canada
- Education: University of Miami (BGS)
- Occupations: Actor; producer; professional wrestler
- Years active: 1996–present
- Works: Full list
- Spouses: Dany Garcia (m. 1997; div. 2008); Lauren Hashian (m. 2019)
- Children: 3, including Simone
- Father: Rocky Johnson
- Relatives: Anoaʻi family
- Professional wrestling career
- Ring names: Flex Kavana; Rocky Maivia; The Rock
- Billed height: 6 ft 5 in (196 cm)
- Billed weight: 260 lb (118 kg)
- Billed from: Miami, Florida
- Trained by: Pat Patterson; Rocky Johnson; Tom Prichard
- Debut: March 10, 1996

Dwayne Douglas Johnson (born May 2, 1972), also known by his ring name "the Rock", is an American actor and semi-retired professional wrestler. He is signed to WWE, where he performs on a part-time basis. Widely regarded as one of the greatest professional wrestlers of all time, Johnson was integral to the development and success of the World Wrestling Federation (WWF, now WWE) during the Attitude Era. He wrestled for the WWF full-time for eight years before pursuing an acting career. His films have grossed over $11.4 billion worldwide, making him one of the world's highest-grossing actors of all time. He is a co-owner of the United Football League, a member of the board of directors of TKO Group Holdings—the parent company of UFC and WWE—and co-founder of Seven Bucks Productions.

After accepting an athletic scholarship to play football at the University of Miami as a defensive tackle, Johnson was a member of the 1991 national championship team but was largely a backup player. Despite aspirations to play professional football, he went undrafted in the 1995 NFL draft, and briefly signed with the Calgary Stampeders before being cut in his first season. In 1996, with assistance from his father in securing a contract, Johnson debuted in the WWF's New Generation Era as Rocky Maivia. The next year, Johnson adopted the more famous gimmick of The Rock, a charismatic trash talker, and soon rose to global prominence in the company's Attitude Era. Johnson left the WWE in 2004; he returned in 2011 as a part-time performer until 2013 and made sporadic appearances until his retirement in 2019; in 2023, he returned once again on a part-time basis. A 10-time world champion—including the promotion's first of African descent—he is also a two-time Intercontinental Champion, a five-time Tag Team Champion, the 2000 Royal Rumble winner, and WWE's sixth Triple Crown champion. Johnson headlined multiple pay-per-view events, including WWE's flagship event WrestleMania six times (15, 16, 17, 28, 29, and 40 – Night 1) which includes the most-bought professional wrestling pay-per-view (WrestleMania 28) and main evented the most-watched episodes of WWE's flagship television series (Raw and SmackDown).

Johnson's first film role was in The Mummy Returns (2001). The next year, he played his first leading role in the action fantasy film The Scorpion King. He has since starred in family films The Game Plan (2007), Race to Witch Mountain (2009), Tooth Fairy (2010), Jumanji: Welcome to the Jungle (2017), Jumanji: The Next Level (2019), and Jungle Cruise (2021), and the action films Journey 2: The Mysterious Island (2012), G.I. Joe: Retaliation (2013), Hercules (2014), Skyscraper (2018), San Andreas (2015), and Rampage (2018). He also starred in the action comedy films Get Smart (2008), Central Intelligence (2016), Baywatch (2017), and Red Notice (2021). His role as Luke Hobbs in the Fast & Furious films, beginning with Fast Five (2011), helped the franchise become one of the highest-grossing in film. He joined the DC Extended Universe by playing the title role in Black Adam (2022). He has also voiced Maui in the Disney animated film Moana (2016) and its sequel Moana 2 (2024), and reprised the role in the 2026 live-action remake. He received critical praise for his dramatic turn as MMA fighter Mark Kerr in the sports biopic The Smashing Machine (2025).

Johnson produced and starred in the HBO comedy-drama series Ballers (2015–2019) and the autobiographical sitcom Young Rock (2021–2023). His autobiography, The Rock Says, was released in 2000 and was a New York Times bestseller. In 2016 and 2019, Time named him as one of the world's most influential people.

== Early life and education ==
Johnson was born in Hayward, California, on May 2, 1972, the son of former professional wrestler Rocky Johnson (born Wayde Douglas Bowles) and Mataniufeagaimaleata "Ata" Fitisemanu (née Maivia). Growing up, he briefly lived in Grey Lynn in Auckland, New Zealand, with his mother's family, where he played rugby and attended Richmond Road Primary School before returning to the U.S.

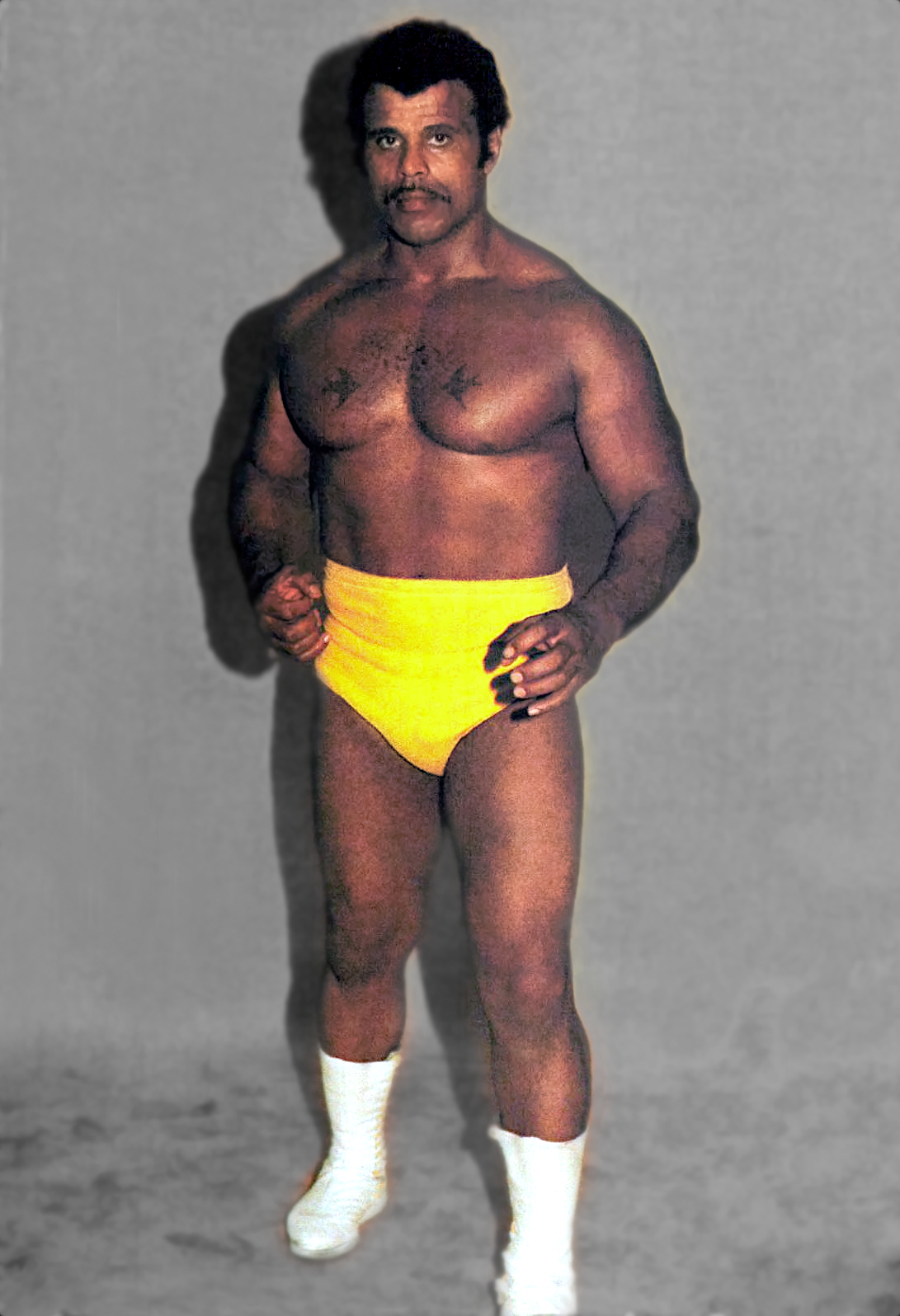
Dwayne's father, Rocky Johnson

Johnson's father was a Black Nova Scotian with a small amount of Irish ancestry, while his mother is Samoan. His father and Tony Atlas were the first black tag team champions in WWE history, in 1983. Johnson's uncle Ricky was also a wrestler. His mother is the adopted daughter of Peter Maivia, who was also a professional wrestler. Johnson's maternal grandmother Lia was one of the first female pro wrestling promoters, taking over Polynesian Pacific Pro Wrestling after her husband's death in 1982 and managing it until 1988. Through his maternal grandfather Maivia, Johnson is a non-blood relative of the Anoaʻi wrestling family. In 2008, he inducted his father and grandfather into the WWE Hall of Fame.

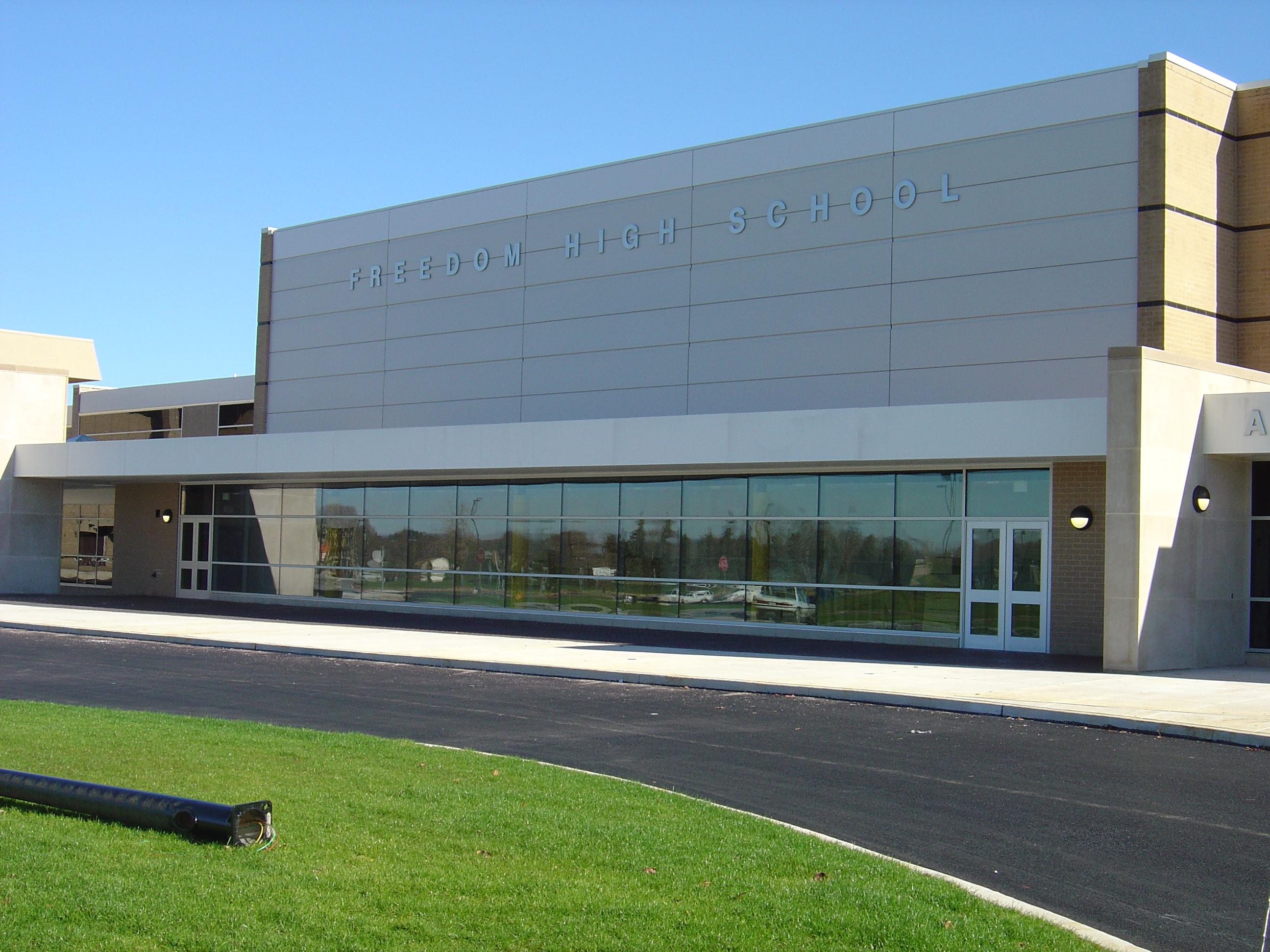
As a senior at Freedom High School in Bethlehem Township, Pennsylvania, Johnson was a member of the school's football, track and field, and wrestling teams.

Johnson attended Montclaire Elementary School in Charlotte, North Carolina, and then moved to Hamden, Connecticut, where he attended Shepherd Glen Elementary School and then Hamden Middle School. He attended President William McKinley High School in Honolulu and then Glencliff High School and McGavock High School, both in Nashville, Tennessee, and then Freedom High School in Bethlehem Township, Pennsylvania, in the Lehigh Valley region of the state, where he graduated in 1990.

At Freedom High School, Johnson initially struggled and was drawn into a culture of conflict and petty crime. By age 17, he had been arrested several times for fighting, theft, and check fraud, and was suspended two weeks for fighting. An article in the local newspaper labeled him "a troubled teenager with a history of run-ins with police". But Freedom High School football coach Jody Cwik saw athletic potential in Johnson, and recruited him to join the school's football team, where he played defensive tackle, an experience that proved to be a significant personal transformation for Johnson. "My thought process started to change. That's when I started thinking about goals and what I wanted to accomplish", he has since said about his high school football experience. In addition to playing football, Johnson also was a member of Freedom High School's track and field and wrestling teams.

By his senior year at Freedom High School, Johnson had played only two years of football, but was offered a full athletic scholarship from the University of Miami, whose football program was beginning to emerge as one of the nation's top-level NCAA Division I teams.

== Football career ==
Dwayne Johnson
No. 94
- Position: Defensive tackle

Personal information
- Listed height: 6 ft 5 in (1.96 m)
- Listed weight: 253 lb (115 kg)

Career information
- High school: Freedom High School (Bethlehem, Pennsylvania)
- College: Miami (FL) (1990–1994)

Career history
- Calgary Stampeders (1995)*
- * Offseason or practice squad member only

Awards and highlights
- National champion (1991)

=== College career ===
As he did in high school, Johnson continued to play defensive tackle at the University of Miami, where he was a member of the Miami Hurricanes 1991 team, which won that year's national championship. Despite playing four years there, however, Johnson found himself behind elite players on the depth chart, including future NFL star and Pro Football Hall of Fame inductee Warren Sapp, and appeared mostly in backup roles. In his time at Miami, Johnson played in 39 games with one start. He recorded 4.5 sacks and 77 tackles.

In 1995, Johnson graduated with a Bachelor of General Studies and a dual major in criminology and physiology. He was also one of the university's most prolific student speakers in the Miami-area community, frequently delivering positive messages about his own struggles and encouraging students to remain in school and avoid the dangers of drug use.

=== Canadian Football League ===
After graduating, Johnson was signed by the Calgary Stampeders of the Canadian Football League. Calgary moved him from defensive tackle to linebacker. He was assigned to Calgary's practice roster, but was cut two months into Calgary's 1995 season.

== Professional wrestling career ==
=== Early career (1996) ===
After being cut by Calgary, Johnson began his professional wrestling career the next year, in 1996. Veteran wrestler Pat Patterson secured several tryout matches for Johnson with the World Wrestling Federation (WWF) in 1996. Wrestling at first under his real name, Johnson defeated the Brooklyn Brawler at a house show on March 10 and lost matches to Chris Candido and Owen Hart. After wrestling at Jerry Lawler's United States Wrestling Association under the name Flex Kavana and winning the USWA tag team championship twice with his partner Bart Sawyer in the summer of 1996, Johnson was signed to a WWF contract. He received additional training from Tom Prichard, alongside Brakkus and Mark Henry.

=== World Wrestling Federation / World Wrestling Entertainment ===
==== Intercontinental Champion (1996–1997) ====
Johnson made his WWF debut as Rocky Maivia, a combination of his father and grandfather's ring names, although announcers acknowledged his real name. He was initially reluctant to take this ring name but was persuaded by Vince McMahon and Jim Ross. He was given the nickname "The Blue Chipper", and to play up his lineage, he was hyped as the WWF's first third-generation wrestler. A clean-cut face character, Maivia was pushed heavily from the start despite his wrestling inexperience. He debuted on Monday Night Raw as a member of Marc Mero's entourage on November 4, 1996. His first match came at Survivor Series on November 17, in an eight-man elimination tag match; he was the sole survivor and eliminated the final two members of the opposing team, Crush and Goldust. On February 13, 1997, he won the Intercontinental Championship from Hunter Hearst Helmsley on a Thursday edition of Monday Night Raw. Maivia then successfully defended the title against Helmsley at In Your House 13: Final Four on February 16.

Johnson's first WrestleMania match came at WrestleMania 13 on March 23, where he was victorious in his Intercontinental Championship defense against The Sultan. WWF fans started to reject his character and push from the company. He defeated Bret Hart by disqualification in a title defense on the March 31 episode of Raw is War. Behind the scenes, Hart mentored Johnson for his first year in WWF and refused to be booked to take the title from him. On April 20, at In Your House 14: Revenge of the 'Taker, he lost to Savio Vega by countout but retained the title. Audiences became increasingly hostile toward Maivia, with chants of "die, Rocky, die" and "Rocky sucks" being heard during his matches.

After losing the Intercontinental Championship to Owen Hart on the April 28 episode of Raw Is War, Maivia suffered a legitimate knee injury in a match against Mankind in June and spent several months recovering.

==== Nation of Domination (1997–1998) ====
Upon returning in August, Maivia turned heel by lashing out at fans who had been booing him and joining Faarooq, D'Lo Brown and Kama in the stable called the Nation of Domination. He then refused to acknowledge the Rocky Maivia name, instead referring to himself in the third person as the Rock, though he would still be billed as "the Rock" Rocky Maivia until 1998. The Rock would then regularly insult the audience, WWF performers, and interviewers in his promos.

At D-Generation X: In Your House on December 7, Stone Cold Steve Austin defeated the Rock in under six minutes to retain the Intercontinental Championship. The next night on Raw Is War, Austin was ordered by Mr. McMahon to defend the title in a rematch, but forfeited it to the Rock instead, handing him the title belt before hitting him with the Stone Cold Stunner. The Rock feuded with Austin and Ken Shamrock through the end of 1997 and beginning of 1998. On January 19, 1998, at the Royal Rumble, the Rock defeated Shamrock by disqualification to retain the Intercontinental Championship. Later that night, the Rock entered the Royal Rumble match and lasted until the final two before he was eliminated by Stone Cold Steve Austin. On March 29, at WrestleMania XIV, the Rock defeated Shamrock by disqualification once again to retain the title. The next night, on Raw is War, the Rock debuted a new Intercontinental Championship design and would later overthrow Faarooq as leader of the Nation of Domination to spark a feud between the two. He then successfully defended the Intercontinental Championship against Faarooq at Over the Edge: In Your House on May 31. The stable would then refer to themselves as simply "The Nation".

The Rock and the Nation then feuded with Triple H and D-Generation X (DX), with the two stable leaders first meeting in the quarter-final of the 1998 King of the Ring tournament, which the Rock won. At King of the Ring on June 28, the Rock defeated Dan Severn in the semi-final match and lost to rival Ken Shamrock in the final. The Rock then resumed his feud with Triple H, as the two had a two out of three falls match at Fully Loaded: In Your House on July 26 for the Intercontinental Championship, which the Rock retained in controversial fashion. This led to a ladder match at SummerSlam on August 30, where the Rock lost the title to Triple H.

In the latter half of 1998, the Rock saw a big uptick in fan support. The Rock also started consolidating his famous persona during this time, which would last until 2000. The Rock's popularity caused him to be booked in a feud with fellow Nation members Mark Henry and D'Lo Brown, turning babyface in the process. Henry defeated the Rock at Judgment Day: In Your House on October 18 after interference from Brown, effectively breaking up the stable.

==== WWF Champion and rise to superstardom (1998–2000) ====
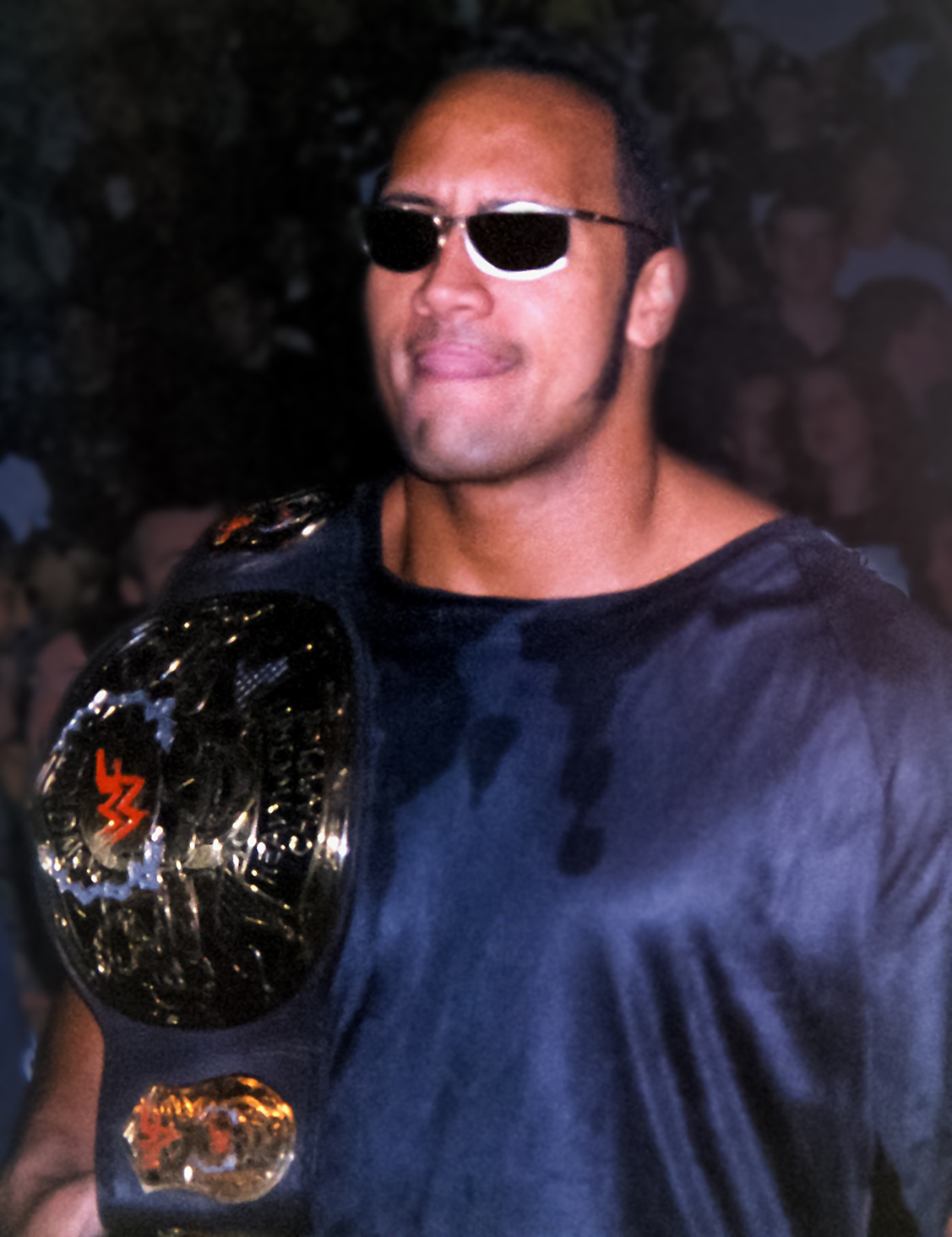
As part of the Corporation, the Rock feuded with Stone Cold Steve Austin and stole Austin's personalized WWF Championship "Smoking Skull" belt.

The Rock was then entered into the "Deadly Game" tournament for the vacant WWF Championship. The finals occurred at Survivor Series on November 15, where the Rock defeated Vince McMahon's associate, Mankind, to win his first WWF Championship. A "double turn" then occurred as the Rock turned heel again after allying with Vince and Shane McMahon as the crown jewel of their stable, the Corporation, after the McMahons betrayed Mankind. On December 13, at the pay-per-view named after him, Rock Bottom: In Your House, the Rock had a rematch with Mankind for the WWF Championship. Mankind appeared to win the match when the Rock passed out to the Mandible Claw submission move, but Vince McMahon ruled that since the Rock did not tap out, he retained his title.

In the main event of the January 4, 1999, episode of Raw Is War, Mankind defeated the Rock for the championship after interference from Stone Cold Steve Austin. Then at the Royal Rumble on January 24, the Rock regained the title in an "I Quit" match, a type of submission match that only ends if one of the combatants says "I quit" on a microphone. Intended to show a vicious streak in the Rock's character, the Rock hit Mankind in the head with a steel chair 11 times instead of the scripted five, five shots already being risky (most wrestling matches in the Attitude Era involving steel chairs had at most 2 or 3 shots to the head). After the fifth shot, Mankind was still ringside instead of two-thirds up the entrance ramp where he was supposed to be, and after the eleventh shot, which knocked Mankind out, a recording of Mankind saying "I Quit" from an earlier interview was played over the public address system. On January 31, during an episode of Sunday Night Heat, the Rock and Mankind participated in an Empty Arena match, a match that took place in an arena with 22,000 empty seats where any part of the facility could be used to contest the match. After 20 minutes of chaotic brawling in the ring, the stands, a kitchen, the catering area, an office, the arena corridors and finally a basement loading area, Mankind pinned the Rock using a forklift truck to win the WWF Championship. The two faced off again, at St. Valentine's Day Massacre: In Your House on February 14, in a Last Man Standing match which ended in a draw, meaning Mankind retained the title. Their feud ended on the February 15 Raw Is War, when the Rock won his third WWF Championship in a Ladder Match after a debuting Big Show interfered on his behalf. The Rock then lost the WWF Championship to Stone Cold Steve Austin at WrestleMania XV on March 28.

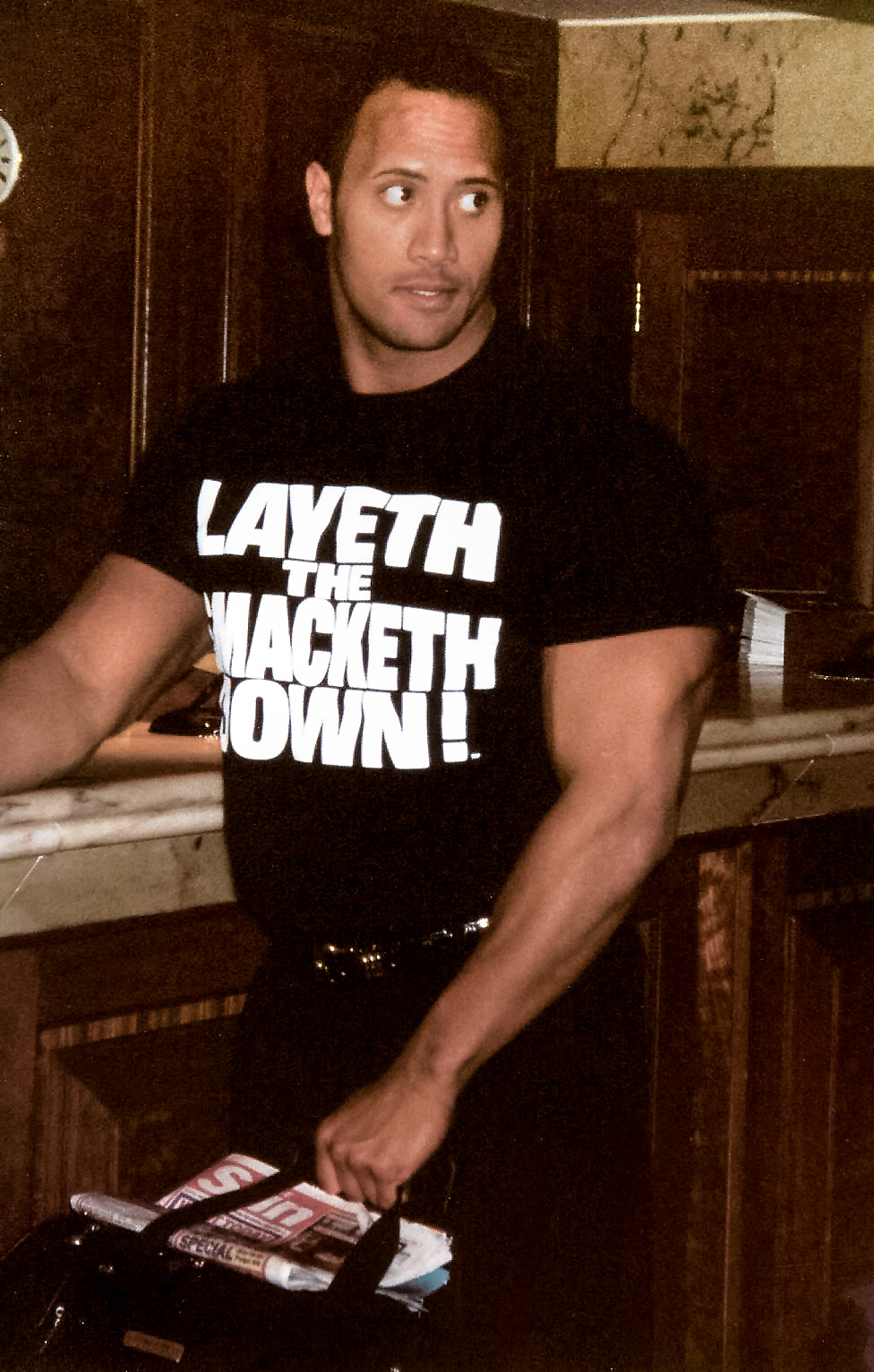
The Rock's popularity was fueled by his charisma and speaking abilities, which led to many catchphrases and merchandising opportunities.

The Rock's popularity continued to grow and audiences still cheered for him even though he was a heel. The Rock then lost the title rematch against Stone Cold Steve Austin at Backlash on April 25. The next night on Raw is War, the Rock was fired from the Corporation after he was betrayed by Shane McMahon, turning him face again and starting a feud with Triple H, the Undertaker and the Corporate Ministry. On April 29, 1999, WWF aired the pilot episode of SmackDown!, a term derived from one of the Rock's catchphrases. In the episode, the Rock continued his feud with the Corporate Ministry. This led to a match with Triple H, at Over the Edge on May 23, which the Rock won, and a match for the WWF Championship against the Undertaker, at King of the Ring on June 27, which the Rock lost. The Rock then lost a number one contender's match to Triple H, at Fully Loaded on July 25, after interference from "Mr. Ass" Billy Gunn. The Rock then defeated Gunn in a Kiss My Ass match at SummerSlam on August 22. The Rock was also given the privilege of having his own signature match, like the Undertaker with the Buried Alive match, Kane with the Inferno Match and Mankind with the Boiler Room Brawl: the Brahma Bullrope match, a variant of a strap match was a normal singles match where the components are tied together with a rope used for cattle farming, and the rope and its attached cowbell could both be used as weapons. The Rock contested this match twice, both times in Texas (vs. Triple H in Dallas, and vs. Al Snow in Houston).

Shortly after SummerSlam, the Rock began teaming with former opponent Mankind and the two became known as the Rock 'n' Sock Connection. They became WWF Tag Team Champions for the first time after defeating the Undertaker and Big Show for the titles on the August 30 episode of Raw is War. The two performed a number of critically acclaimed comedic skits together, including one called "This Is Your Life", which saw Mankind bring parody versions of people from the Rock's past on television, such as his high school girlfriend and his high school football coach, only to have the Rock insult them. The segment earned an 8.4 Nielsen rating, one of the highest ratings ever for a Raw segment. The two lost the titles back to the Undertaker and Big Show on the September 9 episode of SmackDown! and won them back from them on the September 20 episode of Raw is War. The Rock and Mankind then lost the titles to the New Age Outlaws on the very next episode of SmackDown!. The Rock and Mankind would win the WWF Tag Team Championship for the third and final time after beating the New Age Outlaws on the October 14 episode of SmackDown! before losing the titles to the Holly Cousins on the October 18 episode of Raw is War.

At the Royal Rumble on January 23, 2000, the Rock entered the Royal Rumble match and was one of the final two remaining, along with Big Show. In an attempt at a "false finish", Big Show intended to throw the Rock over the top rope in a running powerslam-like position, before the Rock countered the move on the ring apron, sending Big Show to the floor before reentering the ring as the winner. But the Rock's feet accidentally hit the floor during the reversal attempt, though those watching the event on television did not see that. This was played up in the storyline as Big Show provided additional video footage showing it and claimed to be the rightful winner. The Rock's number one contendership for the WWF Championship was then put on the line against Big Show at No Way Out on February 27, which Big Show won after Shane McMahon interfered. The Rock then defeated Big Show on the March 13 episode of Raw Is War, to regain the right to face the WWF Champion, Triple H, at WrestleMania 2000 on April 2, in a Fatal Four-way elimination match, also including Big Show and Mick Foley. Each wrestler had a McMahon in his corner: Triple H had his wife, Stephanie, Foley had Linda, the Rock had Vince and Big Show had Shane. The Rock lasted until the final two but was eliminated by Triple H after Vince betrayed him by hitting him with a chair.

Due to his image at the time, a Magic: The Gathering deck archetype was named after him.

==== Record-breaking world champion (2000–2002) ====
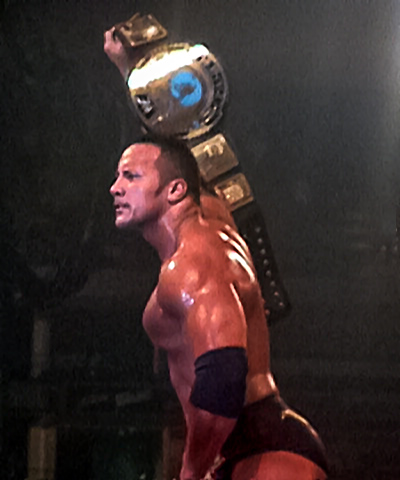
The Rock as the WWF Champion in 2000

In the following weeks, the Rock continued his feud with Triple H and eventually won his fourth WWF Championship, which he won on April 30, at Backlash, after Stone Cold Steve Austin intervened on his behalf. The following night on Raw is War, the Rock successfully defended his title against Shane McMahon in a Steel Cage match. On May 21, at Judgment Day, the Rock faced Triple H in an Iron Man match with Shawn Michaels as the special guest referee. With the score tied at five falls each, and with seconds left on the time limit, the Rock was disqualified when the Undertaker attacked Triple H, thus giving Triple H the 6–5 win and the title. The Rock won the WWF Championship for a fifth time at King of the Ring on June 25 by scoring the winning pin in a six-man tag team match, teaming with Kane and the Undertaker against Shane McMahon, Triple H and Vince McMahon, whom he pinned. The Rock successfully defended the championship against Chris Benoit on July 23 at Fully Loaded. The next month, he successfully defended his title against Kurt Angle and Triple H at SummerSlam on August 27. The Rock had another successful title defense against Benoit, Kane and the Undertaker on September 24 at Unforgiven.

The Rock then lost the WWF Championship to Kurt Angle at No Mercy on October 22, 2000. The next month, the Rock feuded with Rikishi and defeated him at Survivor Series on November 19. The Rock wrestled a six-man Hell in a Cell match for the WWF Championship at Armageddon on December 10, which Angle won to retain the title. On the December 18 episode of Raw is War, the Rock won the WWF Tag Team Championship with the Undertaker, defeating Edge and Christian, before losing the titles back to Edge and Christian the next night at a SmackDown! taping. The Rock continued to feud with Angle over the WWF Championship, culminating at No Way Out on February 25, 2001, where he pinned Angle to win the WWF Championship for a sixth time. The Rock then feuded with the Royal Rumble winner, Stone Cold Steve Austin, whom he lost the title to at WrestleMania X-Seven on April 1 after Austin allied with Vince McMahon, who interfered on his behalf. On the next night's Raw is War, during a steel cage title rematch, Triple H attacked the Rock, allying with McMahon and Austin and helping Austin retain the championship. Austin and Triple H then formed a tag team called the Power Trip, while the Rock was indefinitely suspended in storyline. Johnson used this time off to act in The Scorpion King.

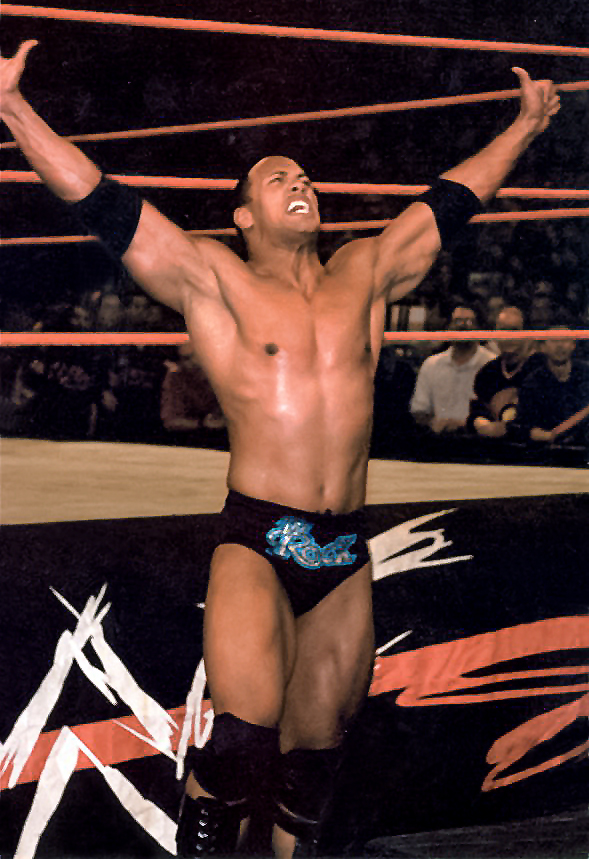
The Rock taunting Rob Van Dam at ringside at WWF Raw, October 2001

The Rock returned in late July when the WWF was feuding with rival promotions World Championship Wrestling (WCW) and Extreme Championship Wrestling (ECW) during what is known as the Invasion storyline. In reality, WCW was purchased by Vince McMahon and the WWF, and ECW had gone out of business in early 2001. Many former WCW and ECW wrestlers were then brought onto WWF television and formed the Alliance to compete with the WWF in storyline. The Alliance and Vince McMahon then both attempted to persuade the Rock to join their team. The Rock then aligned with McMahon and the WWF. The next month, the Rock defeated Booker T at SummerSlam on August 19 to win the WCW Championship for the first time. The Rock later lost the title to Chris Jericho at No Mercy on October 21. The next night on Raw, the Rock teamed with Jericho to win the WWF Tag Team Championship from the Dudley Boyz. The Rock and Jericho then lost the tag titles to Booker T and Test on the November 1, 2001, episode of SmackDown!. The Rock defeated Jericho on the November 5 episode of Raw for his second WCW Championship.

As part of the WWF's battle against the Alliance, the Rock wrestled in a "winner takes all" five-on-five elimination tag team match at Survivor Series on November 18 where the losing team's company would be dissolved in storyline. The Rock was a member of Team WWF along with Chris Jericho, the Undertaker, Kane, and Big Show. The Alliance's team consisted of Stone Cold Steve Austin, Kurt Angle, Booker T, Rob Van Dam, and Shane McMahon. In the end, it came down to a one-on-one between the Rock and Stone Cold Steve Austin. the Rock seemed to have the upper hand, until his teammate Jericho entered the ring and attacked the Rock. Austin tried to capitalize on this by pinning the Rock, but Kurt Angle revealed his true allegiance by attacking Austin. The Rock then pinned Austin, giving Team WWF the victory and forcing the Alliance to disband. The Rock's WCW Championship was renamed the unbranded "World Championship" following the Alliance's loss. At the next pay-per-view, Vengeance on December 9, the Rock lost the World Championship to Jericho, who would then unify the WWF and World titles later that night. The Rock then unsuccessfully challenged Jericho for the now Undisputed WWF Championship at Royal Rumble on January 20, 2002.

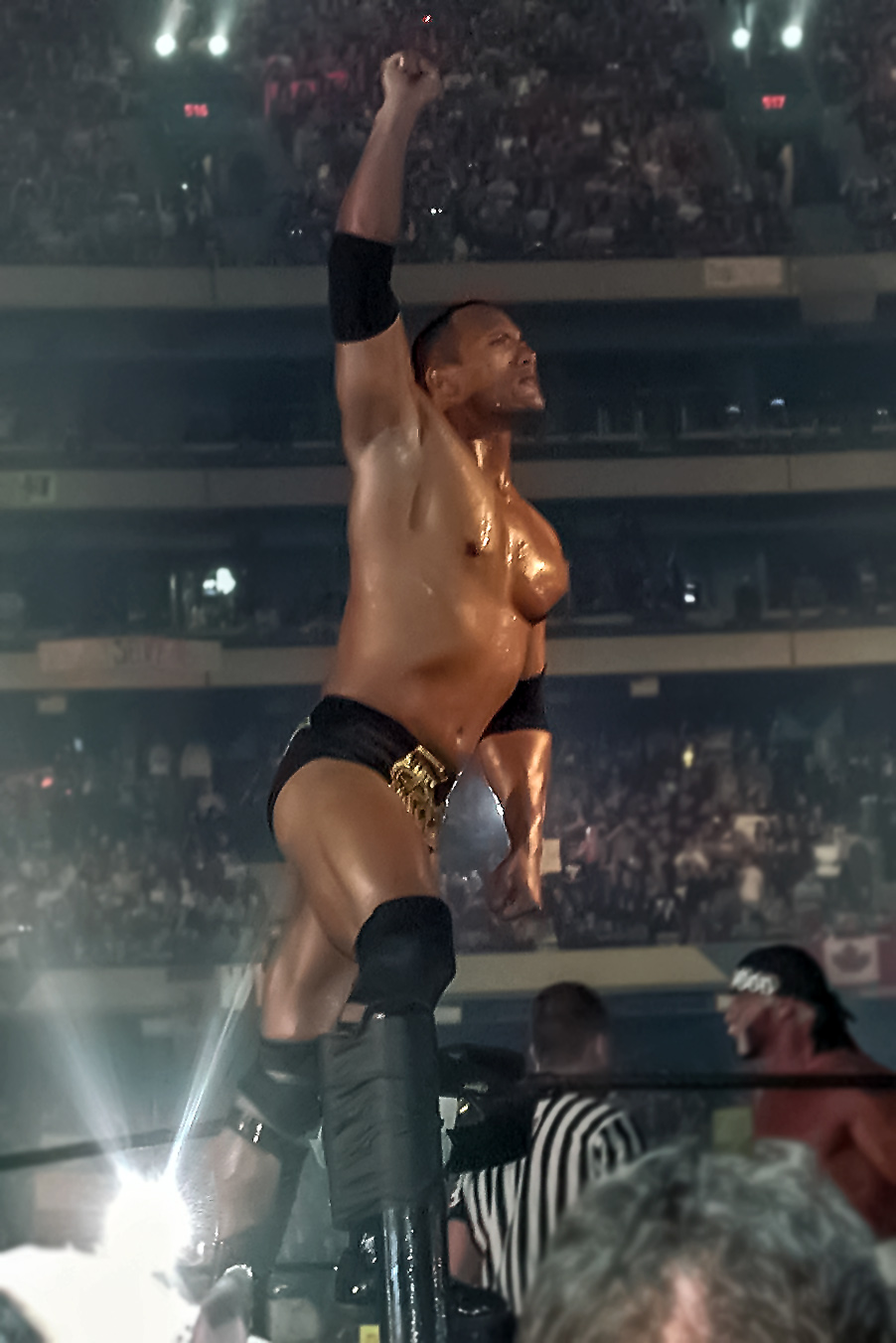
The Rock doing his signature pose before wrestling Hulk Hogan (bottom right) at WrestleMania X8, March 2002

At the next pay-per-view, No Way Out on February 17, the Rock defeated the Undertaker in a singles match. No Way Out also saw the WWF debut of the famed WCW faction New World Order (nWo), which at the time consisted of "Hollywood" Hulk Hogan, Kevin Nash, and Scott Hall. This later led to a match between the Rock and Hogan at WrestleMania X8 on March 17. The match was billed as "icon versus icon", with both men representing the top tier of two generations of wrestling; ultimately the Rock pinned Hogan at WrestleMania X8 to win the match. Despite the Rock portraying a heroic character and Hogan a villain, a portion of the crowd attending the SkyDome was rooting heavily for Hogan. In an interview in 2013, Hogan said he and the Rock changed the style of the match on the fly based on the crowd's response. After the introduction of the first-ever brand extension, the WWF held a "draft lottery" on the March 25, 2002, episode of Raw. The Rock was the number one overall pick, going to the SmackDown! brand before taking a sabbatical from wrestling.

The Rock made a surprise return on a June episode of Raw before going to his assigned brand of SmackDown!. There, the Rock was named the number one contender for the WWE Undisputed Championship, which he won for a record-setting seventh time at Vengeance on July 21, by defeating Kurt Angle and then-champion the Undertaker in a Triple Threat match. The Rock successfully defended the title at the Global Warning event on August 10 against Triple H and Brock Lesnar after pinning Triple H. On August 25, at SummerSlam, the Rock lost the WWE Undisputed Championship to Lesnar along with the record for the youngest WWE Champion, which he had set in 1998. In 2018, writing for ESPN.com, Sean Coyle noted in a retrospective review of the event, that following his victory over Hulk Hogan at WrestleMania X8, the Rock "started to see a dip in fan support" and "that dip turned into a plunge" by the time the Rock had his match with Lesnar at SummerSlam because fans knew he was leaving WWE to pursue an acting career, as evidenced by the negative crowd response during his match with Lesnar. After SummerSlam ended, the Rock was visibly angry at the crowd reaction. When he tried to do a post-show speech for the crowd, the fans booed him. He eventually cut a short promo, declaring that "sing-along with the Rock is over!" The Rock then took time off to kickstart his acting career.

==== Hollywood Rock (2003) ====
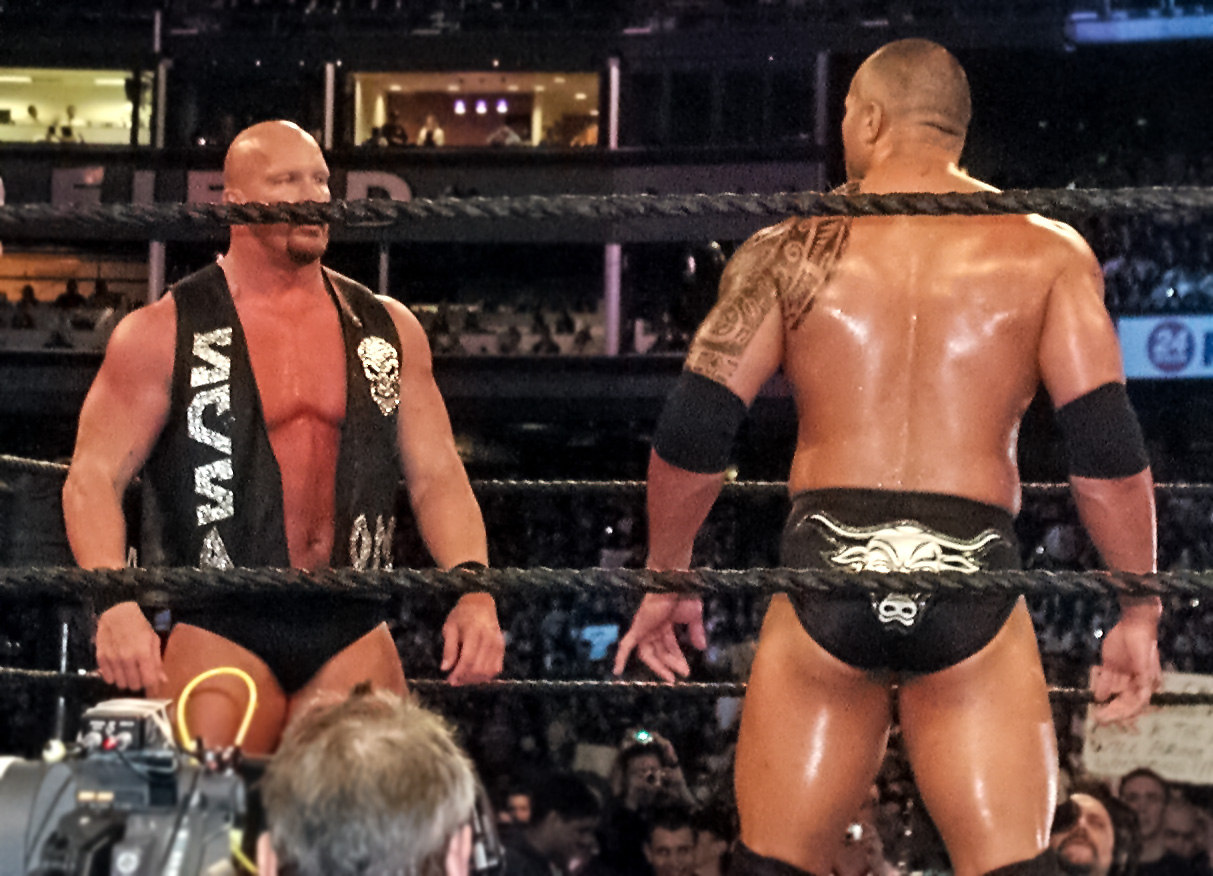
The Rock defeated Stone Cold Steve Austin (left) in Austin's final match at WrestleMania XIX in March 2003.

The Rock returned on the January 30, 2003, episode of SmackDown! to set up another match with Hulk Hogan at No Way Out on February 23. Because of negative fan reaction during previous matches as a result of his budding acting career, the Rock turned heel. He also started a new persona that has been called "Hollywood Rock", with a new look and a shaved head. The Rock defeated Hogan at No Way Out before moving to the Raw brand. There, the Rock had various small feuds, including one with The Hurricane. The Rock also began performing "Rock Concerts", segments in which he played the guitar and mocked WWE performers and fans in song.

After failing to win a number one contendership for the World Heavyweight Championship, the Rock went into another program with Stone Cold Steve Austin. This led to a match at WrestleMania XIX on March 30, which called back to their previous two WrestleMania encounters, both of which Austin had won. The Rock won after delivering three consecutive Rock Bottoms, ending their long-running rivalry in what turned out to be Austin's final match, until WrestleMania 38. The next night, Raw was billed as "the Rock Appreciation Night", in honor of the Rock's victory over Austin. That night, the Rock was attacked by a debuting Goldberg. At Backlash on April 27, Goldberg defeated the Rock, who then briefly left WWE to film Walking Tall.

==== Final feuds and departure (2003–2004) ====
On the June 2 episode of Raw, the Rock joined the Highlight Reel and attacked Christian and Chris Jericho with Booker T, turning face once again. The Rock would later return on the December 8 episode of Raw to help Mick Foley against La Résistance. In 2004, the Rock aided Mick Foley in his feud against Evolution, leading to a reunion of the Rock 'n' Sock Connection. They lost against Ric Flair, Randy Orton, and Batista in a handicap match at WrestleMania XX on March 14, 2004, when Orton pinned Foley after an RKO. This was Johnson's final wrestling match until November 2011. The Rock appeared in WWE sporadically following WrestleMania XX. He made returns to provide support for Eugene against Jonathan Coachman and made a cameo in his hometown of Miami, where he confronted Randy Orton. On the August 23 episode of Raw, he hosted a pie-eating contest, as part of the WWE Diva Search, and ended the segment by giving Coachman a People's Elbow. The Rock's contract with WWE then ended on December 31, 2004 and he started his full-time acting career.

==== Non-wrestling appearances (2007–2009) ====
On March 12, 2007, the Rock appeared on a WWE show after nearly three years, via a pre-taped promo shown during Raw. He correctly predicted that Bobby Lashley would defeat Umaga at WrestleMania 23 in Donald Trump's and Vince McMahon's "Battle of the Billionaires" Hair vs. Hair match. On March 29, 2008, Johnson inducted his father Rocky Johnson and grandfather Peter Maivia into the WWE Hall of Fame. His next appearance was through a pre-taped promo on October 2, 2009, during the Decade of SmackDown.

=== Independent circuit (2009) ===
On September 30, 2009, the Rock appeared at a World Xtreme Wrestling (WXW) show to support the professional wrestling debut of Sarona Snuka, the daughter of his longtime friend and mentor Jimmy Snuka.

=== Return to WWE ===
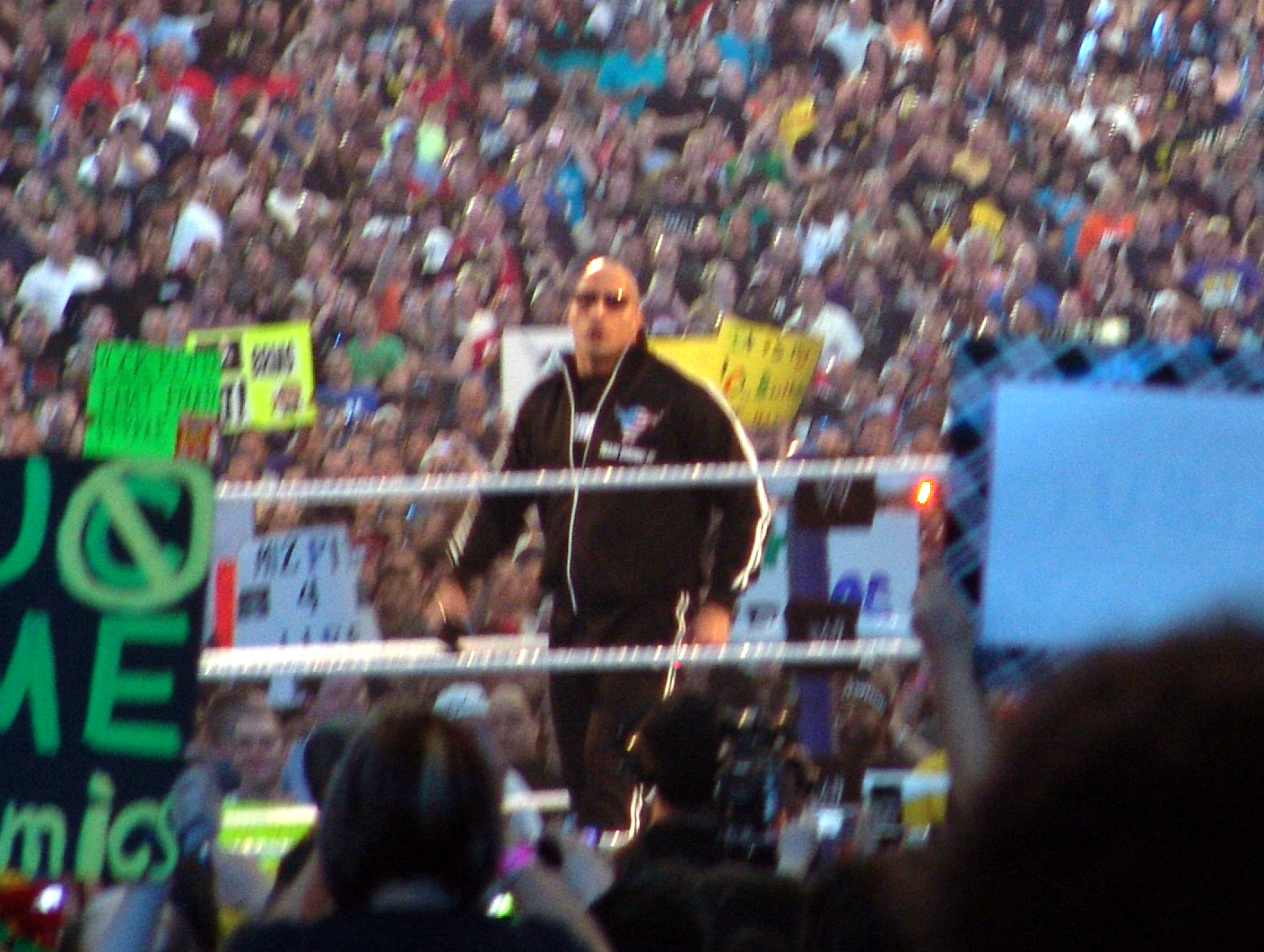
The Rock in the ring as WrestleMania XXVII host, April 2011

==== Feud with John Cena (2011–2013) ====
On February 14, 2011, the Rock was announced as the host of WrestleMania XXVII on April 3, 2011, appearing live on Raw. During a lengthy promo, he addressed the fans and started a feud with John Cena. After numerous appearances via satellite, the Rock appeared live on the Raw before WrestleMania XXVII to confront Cena. After he and Cena exchanged insults, the Miz and Alex Riley appeared and attacked the Rock; he fended off Miz and Riley, only for Cena to blindside him with an Attitude Adjustment.

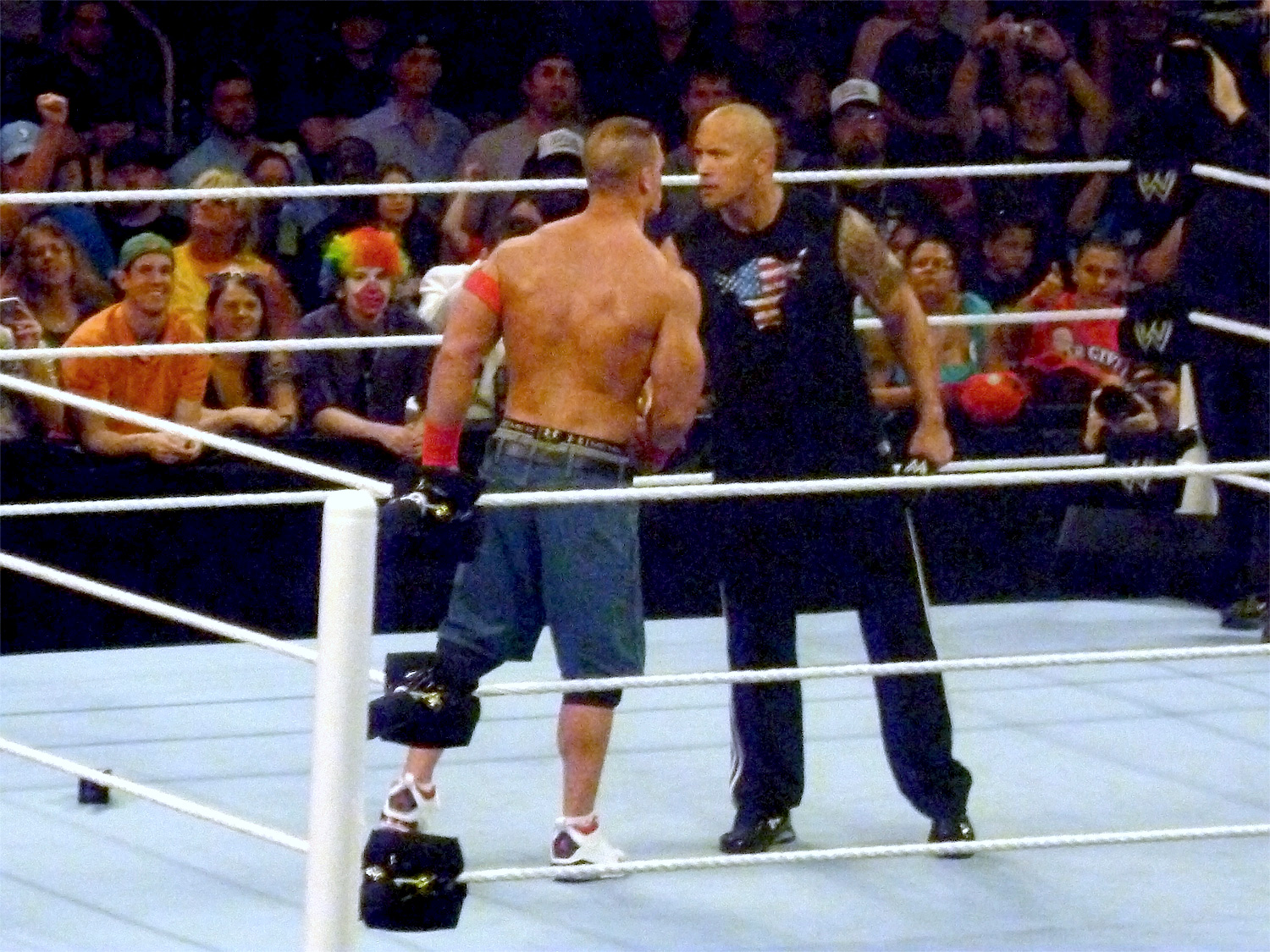
The Rock and John Cena (left) on Raw, agreeing to a match at WrestleMania XXVIII one year in advance

On April 3, at WrestleMania XXVII, the Rock opened the show by cutting a promo. After appearing in numerous backstage segments, the Rock came to ringside to restart the main event between Cena and the Miz as a No Disqualification match, after it had ended in a double countout. As revenge for the Attitude Adjustment Cena had given him on Raw, the Rock hit Cena with the Rock Bottom, allowing the Miz to pin him and retain the WWE Championship. After the match, the Rock attacked the Miz and hit him with the People's Elbow. The next night on Raw, the Rock and Cena agreed to a match at WrestleMania XXVIII the next year. They then worked together to fend off an attack by the Corre, which at the time consisted of Wade Barrett, Heath Slater, Justin Gabriel, and Ezekiel Jackson.

The Rock appeared live on Raw in his hometown of Miami to celebrate his 39th birthday. On September 16, WWE announced the Rock would wrestle in a traditional 5-on-5 Survivor Series tag team match, teaming with Cena at Survivor Series in November. But on the October 24 episode of Raw SuperShow, Cena instead suggested the Rock be his partner in a standard tag team match against the Miz and R-Truth, a team called Awesome Truth, which Rock agreed to the next week. On November 14, during the special Raw Gets Rocked, the Rock appeared live, delivering Rock Bottoms to Mick Foley, who had been hosting a "This Is Your Life"-style segment for Cena, and later both members of Awesome Truth. The Rock and Cena defeated Awesome Truth on November 20 at Survivor Series, when the Rock pinned the Miz. After the match, the Rock gave Cena a Rock Bottom.

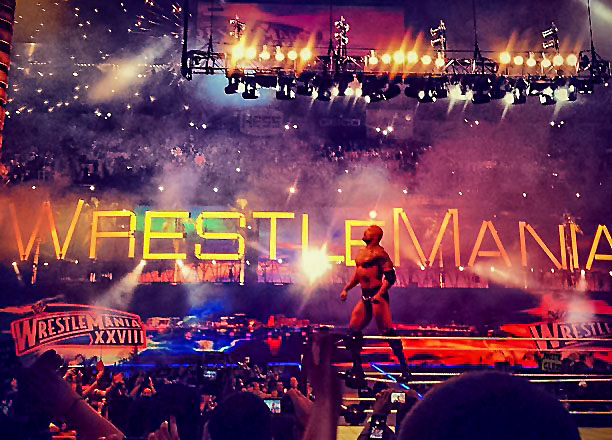
The Rock celebrating his victory at WrestleMania XXVIII, April 2012

Leading up to WrestleMania, the Rock and Cena had several verbal confrontations on Raw SuperShow. On the March 12, 2012, episode of Raw SuperShow, the Rock hosted his first "Rock Concert" segment since 2004, mocking Cena in his songs. On April 1, at WrestleMania XXVIII, the Rock defeated Cena in the main event after countering Cena's attempt at a People's Elbow into a Rock Bottom and pinning Cena. This event broke the record for biggest professional wrestling pay-per-view buyrate. The following night on Raw SuperShow, the Rock praised Cena, calling their match "an honor". He then vowed to once again become WWE Champion.

On July 23, at Raw 1000, the Rock announced he would wrestle for the WWE Championship at the Royal Rumble pay-per-view. At the event, the Rock defeated Punk to win the title. Punk received a title rematch with the Rock, at Elimination Chamber, where he retained the championship. The following night on Raw, the Rock unveiled a new WWE Championship design, with a different center plate and removable customizable side-plates which had his "Brahma Bull" logo. The Rock then resumed his rivalry with John Cena, who won that year's Royal Rumble to set up a rematch of the previous WrestleMania match between the two at WrestleMania 29, only this time with the WWE Championship on the line.

On April 7, at WrestleMania 29, the Rock lost the WWE Championship to Cena, ending his reign at 70 days. Despite being advertised for Raw after WrestleMania, where it was stated that the Rock was still entitled a rematch for the WWE Championship, the Rock did not appear because of a real injury sustained during his match with Cena, in which his abdominal and adductor tendons tore from his pelvis. Johnson underwent surgery on April 23 to reattach the torn tendons.

==== Part-time appearances and first retirement (2014–2023) ====
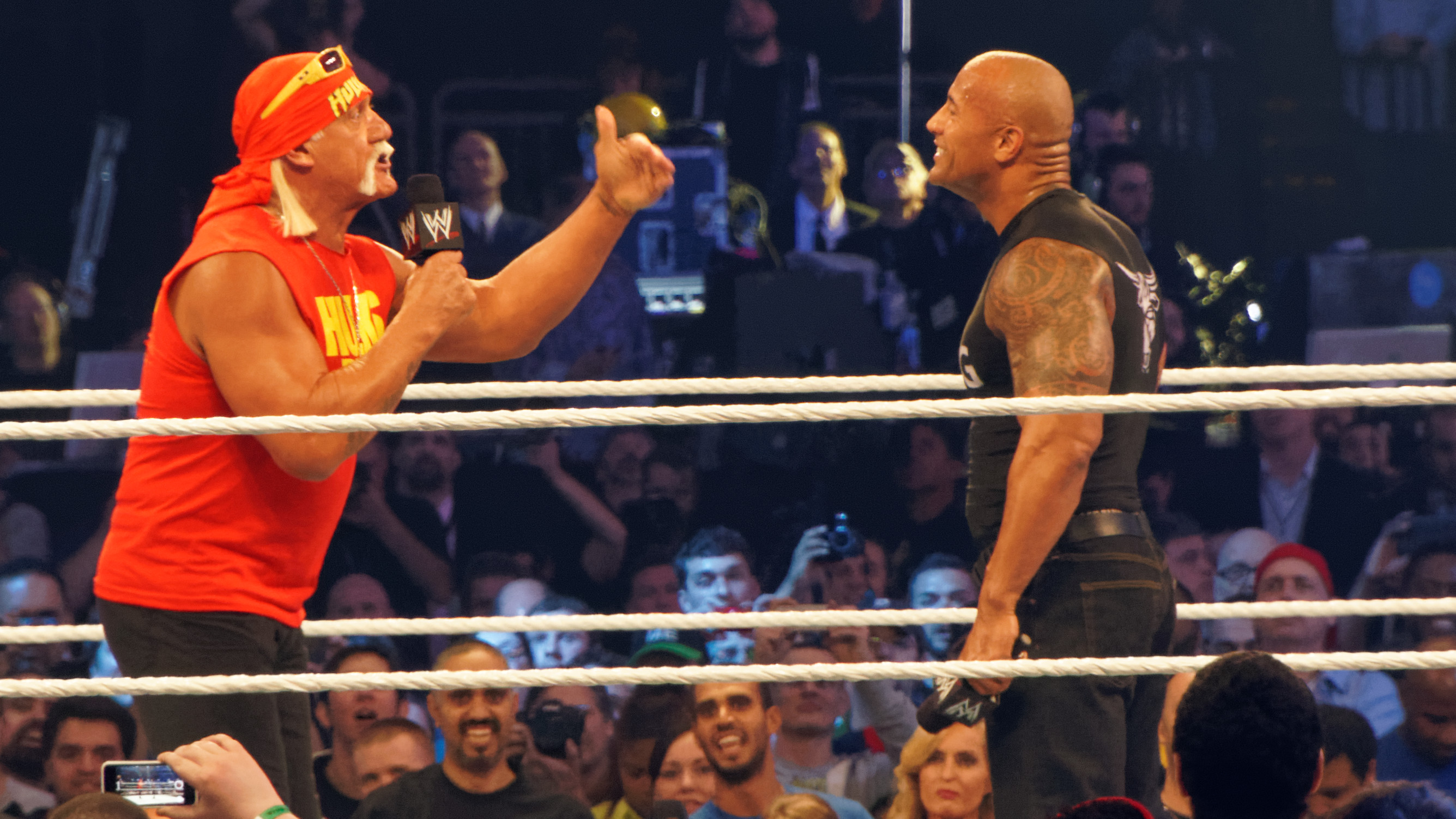
The Rock (right) confronts Hulk Hogan at WrestleMania XXX, April 2014.

From 2014 to 2023, he appeared on WWE shows, most notably in the opening segment of WrestleMania XXX with Hulk Hogan and Steve Austin, at WrestleMania 31, alongside Ronda Rousey, getting into an in-ring altercation with Triple H and Stephanie McMahon, and at WrestleMania 32, where he defeated Erick Rowan in six seconds, which set the record for the fastest win in WrestleMania history. In 2015, he also appeared at the 2015 Royal Rumble event, where he helped his relative Roman Reigns to win the Royal Rumble match.

He also appeared on several episodes of Raw and SmackDown. On August 3, 2019, the Rock officially announced his retirement from professional wrestling.

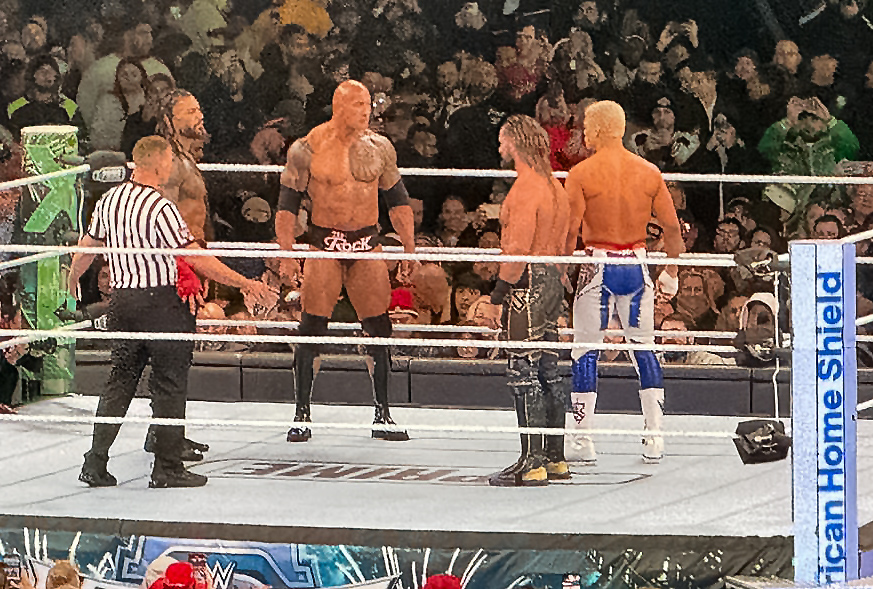
The Rock and Roman Reigns face to face with Cody Rhodes and Seth "Freakin" Rollins at WrestleMania XL, April 2024

==== The Final Boss (2024–present) ====
The Rock made his return to WWE on the Day 1 edition of Raw on January 1, 2024. The Rock also appeared on the February 2 episode of SmackDown, where he confronted WWE Undisputed Champion Roman Reigns after Royal Rumble winner Cody Rhodes decided against choosing Reigns as his WrestleMania 40 opponent to allow the Rock to come out of retirement and face Reigns. This was met by intense backlash from fans who wanted Rhodes to face Reigns; so the Rock turned heel and aligned with Reigns.

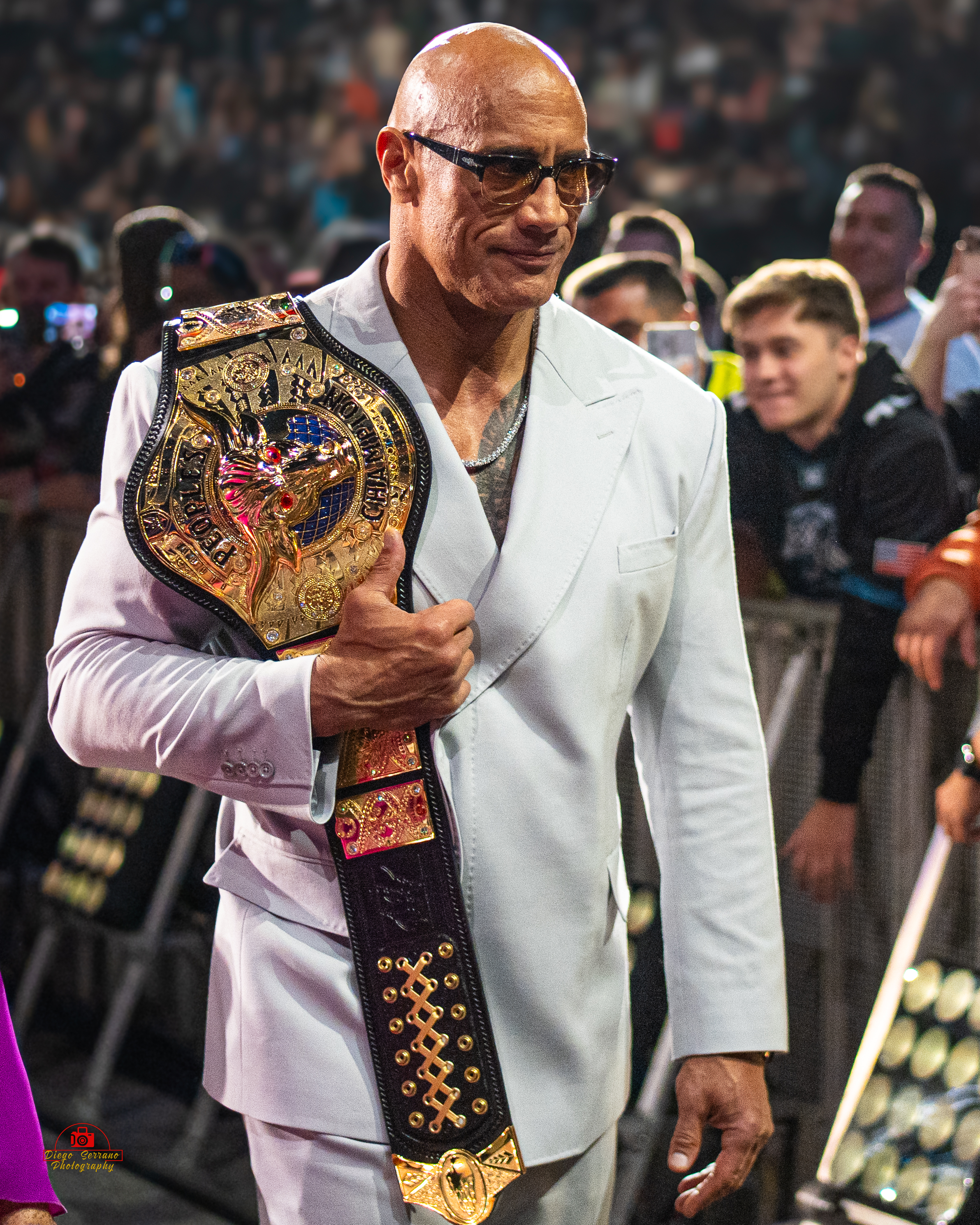
The Rock with "the People's Championship" at the 2024 WWE Hall of Fame induction ceremony in April 2024

He also debuted a new persona that incorporated facets of his arrogant "Hollywood Rock" incarnation from 2003, such as insulting the audience, wearing gaudy expensive clothes, and entering the arena to a new entrance theme that began with his heroic character's music before transitioning into his "Hollywood Rock" music, being known as "The Final Boss". In the Night 1 main event of WrestleMania XL, the Rock and Reigns defeated Rhodes and Rollins, allowing Rhodes to wrestle for Reign's title under Bloodline Rules. During the Night 2 main event between Reigns and Rhodes, multiple people interfered on behalf of both men; but Rhodes went on to defeat Reigns for the Undisputed WWE Championship. After WrestleMania, the Rock took time off to film the biopic The Smashing Machine.

Rock made his return six months later, at Bad Blood. He also appeared on the Raw premiere on Netflix on January 6, 2025, at NXT: New Year's Evil, making his first NXT appearance, and at Elimination Chamber, where he turned John Cena heel and ordered him to attack Rhodes after the latter refused to be his champion.

To coincide with the 30th anniversary of his debut at the 1996 Survivor Series, The Rock confirmed that he would be making an appearance at the 2026 Survivor Series: WarGames.

== Mainstream crossover ==
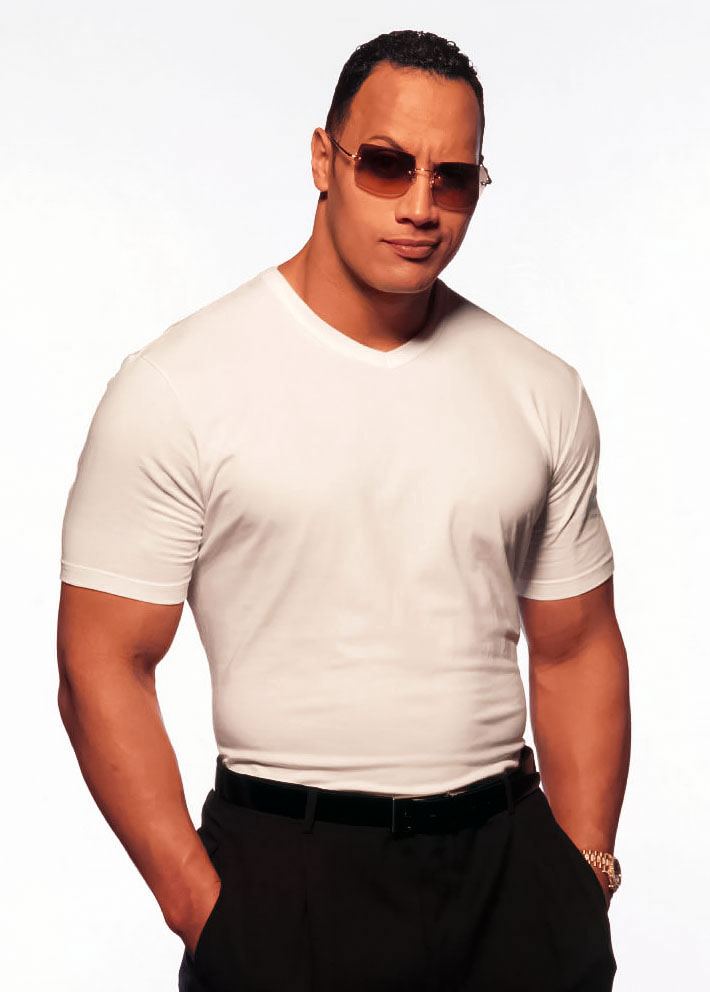
The Rock in a 2001 Vanity Fair photo shoot

The Rock appeared on Wyclef Jean's 2000 single "It Doesn't Matter" and in its music video. He also recorded "Pie" with Slick Rick for WWF The Music, Vol. 5. In 1999, Johnson appeared on That '70s Show as his father Rocky Johnson. The next year, he was on Star Trek: Voyager as an alien wrestler who used the Rock's moves. In 2000, he hosted Saturday Night Live (SNL) for the first time. Fellow wrestlers Triple H, Big Show, and Mick Foley also appeared on the show. Johnson has said the success of that episode is the reason he began receiving offers from Hollywood studios. He has since hosted SNL four more times.

In 1999, the Rock was listed No. 1 on Entertainment Weekly's Top 12 Entertainers of the Year. In 2000, Access Hollywood ranked him No. 1 in their list of the Top 10 Celebrities of 2000. That year, Rock was also listed in the Forbes Celebrity 100 and People Magazine's 25 Most Intriguing People. The Rock was listed on Entertainment Weekly's 101 Most Influential People in both 2000 and 2001. In 2001, he was also listed on E!'s 20 Top Entertainers. In 2002, the Rock was listed on E!'s 25 Toughest Stars. In 2003, he was listed in VH1's 200 Greatest Pop Culture Icons and was No. 7 in People Magazine's 50 Favorite TV Stars.

The Rock made a surprise appearance at the official Xbox unveiling during Bill Gates's keynote speech at the ongoing Consumer Electronics Show in 2001. Johnson's motion picture debut was as The Scorpion King in The Mummy Returns (2001). The movie broke a two-year record for the highest-grossing single day in film history by earning $28,594,667. The movie's financial success led to Johnson's first leading role in the spin-off The Scorpion King (2002). He received $5.5 million for the role and Guinness World Records named him the record-holder for highest-paid actor in their first leading role.

The Rock has appeared on the covers of many magazines, including Rolling Stone, Entertainment Weekly, and TV Guide. He has also appeared in, and been the cover athlete for, several video games. As of July 2026, his Instagram account is the fifth most-followed in the world, with over 382 million followers.

== Legacy in professional wrestling ==
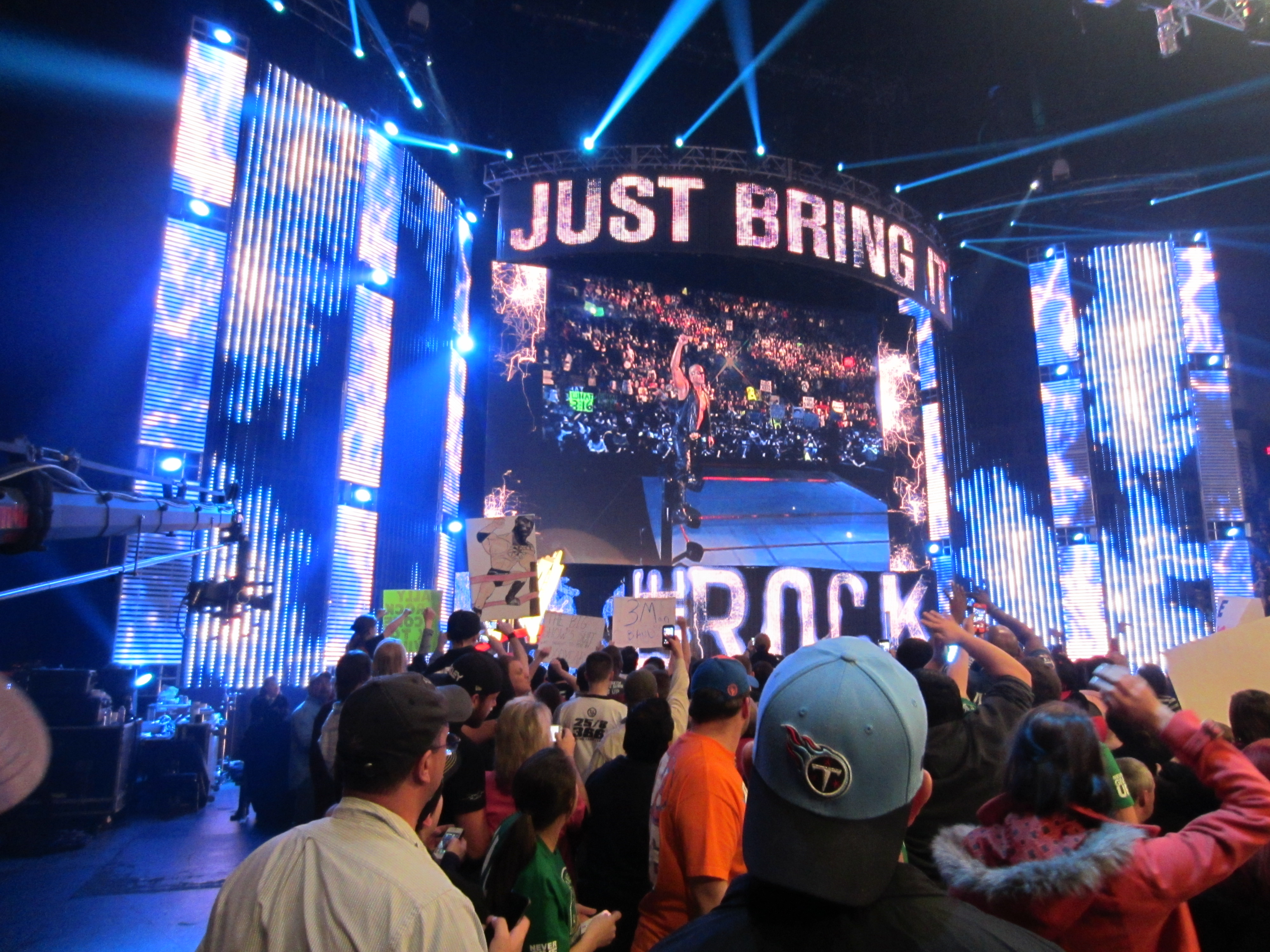
Fans watching on as The Rock makes his entrance in 2013

The Rock has been listed as one of the all-time greatest professional wrestlers, as well as one of the top draws in wrestling history. Many have placed the Rock on their "Mount Rushmore of Pro Wrestling", including Hulk Hogan, Ric Flair, and John Cena. In Cable Visions: Television Beyond Broadcasting, the Rock was described as "for a long time, the WWE's biggest star and probably held the greatest international appeal". R. D. Reynolds stated in his book The WrestleCrap Book of Lists that the Rock was "the biggest star for WWE from 1999 until 2004". The Rock's "I quit" match with Mankind at the 1999 Royal Rumble event is infamous for its brutality and one of the most popular "I quit" match of all times.

The Rock main-evented the most bought pay-per-view worldwide in WWE history (WrestleMania XXVIII), the most bought pay-per-view domestically in WWE history (WrestleMania X-Seven), the highest rated Raw in history, the highest rated SmackDown in history, and was part of the highest rated cable segment in WWE history with Mankind entitled "This is Your Life", in which Mankind would honor the Rock with various gifts and reunions. His return in 2001 had a 7.1 rating, the highest-rated segment of the year. The Rock was also part of the highest-rated match of the 21st century when his WWF Championship defense against Shane McMahon, on May 1, 2000, got an 8.3 rating, making it the highest-rated segment of all time, behind "This Is Your Life". In 2011, the Rock's return to an episode of Raw generated an average of 4.7 million viewers in the United States, with 7.4 million tuning in during his promo. Raw 1000 was the highest rated Raw episode of 2012 and his segment with CM Punk and Daniel Bryan was the highest rated segment of the show. In 2013, the night after the Rock won the WWE Championship, at Royal Rumble, Raw got its highest rating of that year.

Derived from one of his catchphrases "lay the smackdown", WWE introduced in 1999 its second flagship program, WWE SmackDown, which became television's second longest-running weekly episodic program in history. The term "smackdown" was included in Merriam-Webster dictionaries in 2007. He is also known for popularizing the term "jabroni", derived from "jobber", although it was originally introduced by The Iron Sheik. The Rock holds the record for most Raw shows main-evented in one year (38 in 2000), most SmackDown shows main-evented in one year (36 in 2000), and is tied with Stone Cold Steve Austin (in 2001) for most PPV shows main evented in one year (12 in 2000). The Rock is also one of two wrestlers (the other being The Undertaker) to main event WrestleMania in four different decades: 1990s: XV (1999); 2000s: WrestleMania 2000 (2000), X-Seven (2001); 2010s: XXVIII (2012), 29 (2013); 2020s: XL (2024).

At the 2021 Survivor Series, WWE held a 25-man Battle Royal to celebrate the 25th Anniversary of the Rock's WWE debut. The match was won by Omos.

== Acting career ==
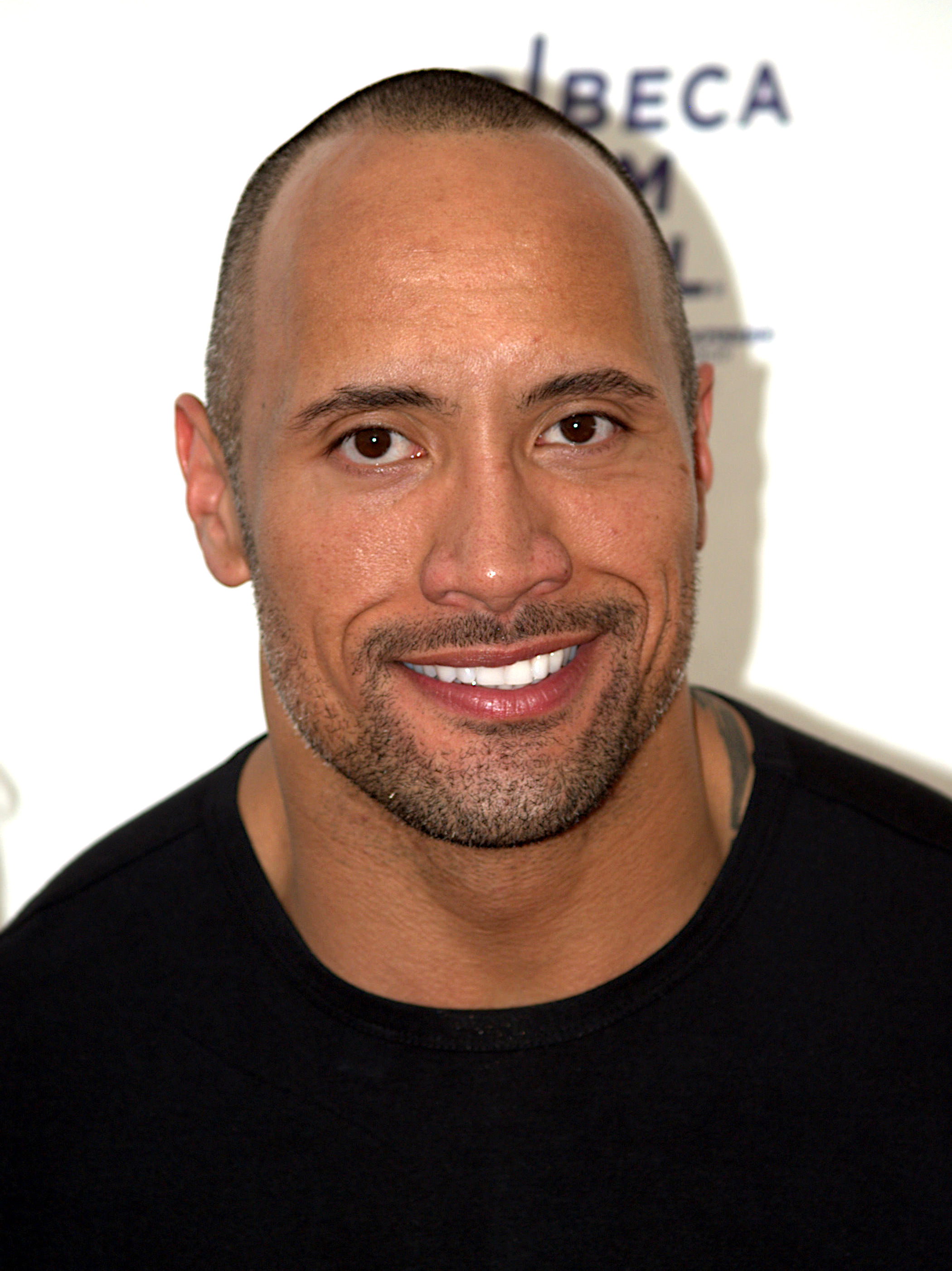
Johnson in April 2009

Johnson entered Hollywood and had early success due to his wrestling popularity and noted work ethic. Over his acting career, he became one of the highest-paid and most successful actors in Hollywood.

=== Career beginnings (1999–2010) ===
He began his acting career on television while wrestling. In his first television acting job, in 1999, he portrayed his father Rocky Johnson in an episode of That '70s Show called "That Wrestling Show". Nearly a year later, he appeared in the Star Trek: Voyager episode "Tsunkatse" as an alien wrestler who fought against Seven of Nine. While Johnson was away from WWE, the company continued to sell "the Rock" merchandise, and he continued to be featured prominently in the opening montages of their television shows.

Johnson made his theatrical debut in The Mummy Returns (2001), playing the antagonist Mathayus "The Scorpion King". He reprised this role in the spin-off film The Scorpion King (2002), where he starred as the titular character. Johnson was paid $5.5 million for his leading role, putting him in the Guinness World Records for the highest salary for a first-time leading man. The film was a commercial success and despite mixed reception, Johnson's acting was praised. Film critic Roger Ebert wrote, "I expect him to become a durable action star".

In the following years, he worked in action films The Rundown (2003), and Walking Tall (2004), but these films failed to gain success. He had a supporting role in the comedy Be Cool (2005) as a homosexual bodyguard hoping to become an actor, and was the primary antagonist in the horror film Doom (2005). He also worked in the sports drama Gridiron Gang (2006), comedy Reno 911!: Miami (2007), and thriller Southland Tales (2006). He had further success by playing an arrogant famous American football player in the sports family comedy The Game Plan (2007), Agent 23 in spy action comedy Get Smart (2008), a cab driver in the science fiction film Race to Witch Mountain (2009), the title character in the fantasy comedy Tooth Fairy (2010) and a police officer in buddy cop comedy The Other Guys (2010). Johnson returned to action genre in the unsuccessful Faster (2010).

Johnson made his voice acting debut in the 2006 video game Spyhunter: Nowhere to Run, originally intended as a tie-in for an unproduced film. He also voiced NASA astronaut Chuck in the 2009 animated sci-fi comedy Planet 51. He presented the Academy Award for Best Visual Effects at the 80th Academy Awards.

=== Commercial success (2011–2020) ===
Johnson's first big box-office success came in 2011, portraying Luke Hobbs in Fast Five (2011); the film became the seventh highest-grossing film of 2011. Following this, all of Johnson's projects in the 2010s decade achieved major success and established him as a bankable actor. He next starred in the box office hit Journey 2: The Mysterious Island in 2012. He became known for reinvigorating film franchises after portraying Marvin F. Hinton / Roadblock in G.I. Joe: Retaliation and reprising his role as Luke Hobbs in Fast & Furious 6 (2013), while also starring in true-story films Pain & Gain (2013) and Empire State (2013). That same year, he hosted and produced the TNT reality competition series The Hero, and won the Favorite Male Buttkicker Award at the 2013 Nickelodeon Kid's Choice Awards. In May 2013, it was announced that he would executive produce and star in Ballers, an HBO comedy-drama series about NFL players living in Miami. By December of that year, Forbes named him the top-grossing actor of 2013, with his films bringing in $1.3 billion worldwide for the year. Forbes credited the success of Fast & Furious 6, which grossed $789 million globally, and his frequent acting work as primary reasons for topping the list.

Johnson starred as the title character in Hercules in 2014 and hosted another reality series for TNT that same year, entitled Wake Up Call, which saw him "lending a helping hand to everyday people who were facing enormous challenges in their lives" alongside guest experts such as Rocco DiSpirito, Jillian Michaels, and Josh Shipp. In 2015, Johnson reprised his role as Luke Hobbs in Furious 7 and starred in the disaster film San Andreas. In 2016, he co-starred with Kevin Hart in the action-comedy Central Intelligence and had a lead voice role in the Disney animated film Moana, in which he voiced Maui. He reprised his role as Luke Hobbs in The Fate of the Furious, which was released in 2017. Johnson starred in two other blockbuster movies that year, Baywatch and Jumanji: Welcome to the Jungle as Mitchell "Mitch" Buchannon and Dr. Smolder Bravestone, respectively. In 2018, he starred in two solo box office hits Rampage and Skyscraper.

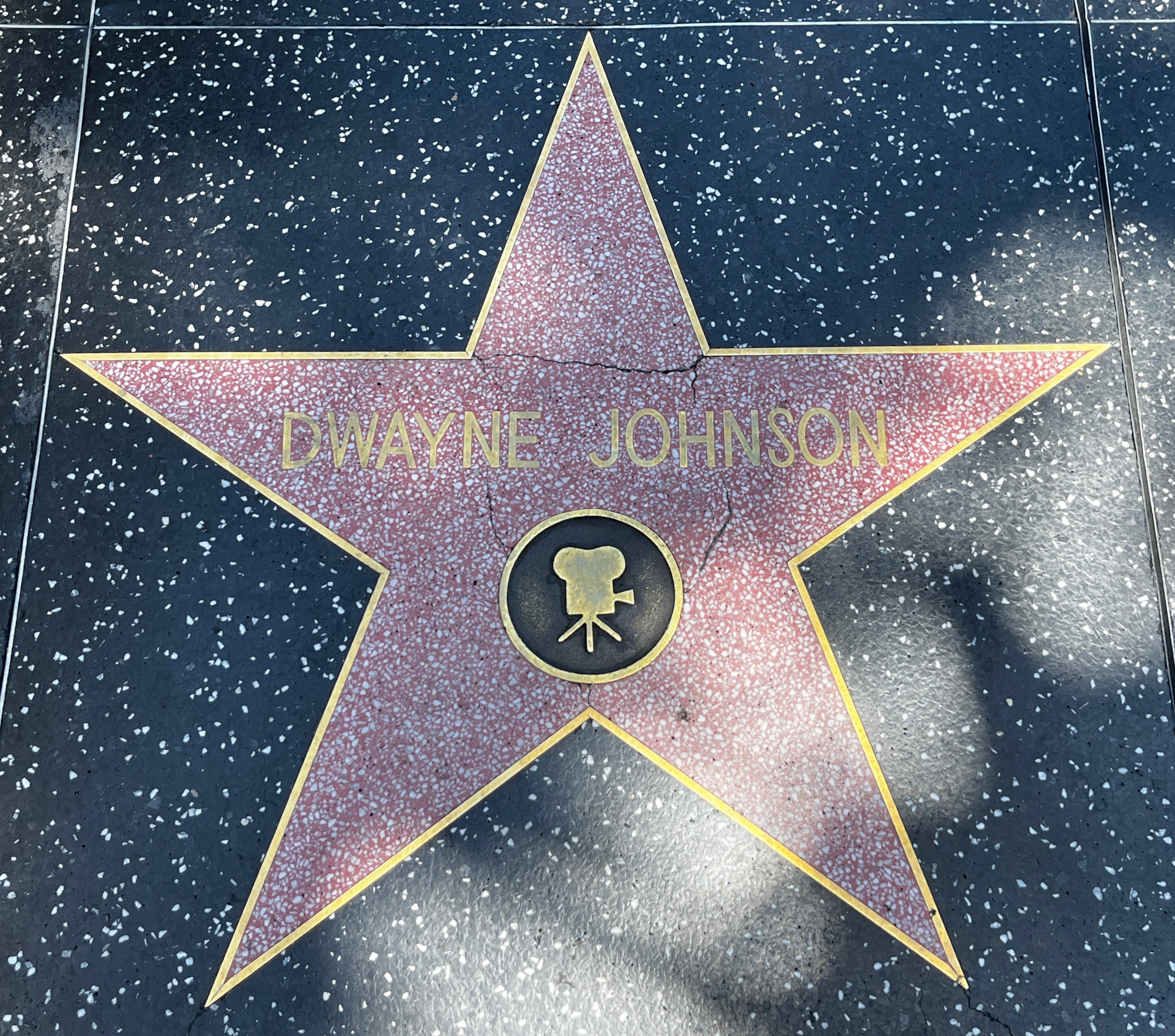
Johnson's star on the Hollywood Walk of Fame

Johnson's role within the Fast & Furious franchise continued with Fast & Furious Presents: Hobbs & Shaw, starring alongside co-star Jason Statham. David Leitch directed the project from a script co-written by franchise-writer Chris Morgan and Drew Pearce. The film began principal photography in September 2018, and was released on July 26, 2019. Johnson reprised his role as Bravestone in Jumanji: The Next Level. With the critical and financial success of Welcome to the Jungle, production of the movie began in early 2019, and it was released on December 13, 2019.

Johnson's films grossed $10.6 billion in the 2010s, making him the decade's sixth-highest-grossing actor and the highest-grossing actor outside the Marvel Cinematic Universe.

=== Career fluctuations (2021–2024) ===
In 2021, after a year long hiatus, Johnson co-starred with Emily Blunt in Disney's Jungle Cruise as Frank Wolff. The film is based on the theme-park ride of the same name. Jaume Collet-Serra directed, with a script by Michael Green from a previous one by J. D. Payne and Patrick McKay. In addition to his work on the film, Johnson assisted with re-designing the titular ride for all Disney theme parks. Jungle Cruise was released on July 30, 2021. On March 16, 2021, he appeared for the first time as the video game character, The Foundation, in Fortnite Battle Royale. Johnson was initially uncredited in his role, yet hinted at his involvement through a series of Instagram posts. His involvement was finally confirmed during the Chapter 2 End Event on December 4, 2021, with The Foundation removing his helmet to reveal that he shared Johnson's voice and likeness. He would later reprise his role as The Foundation in 2026. Also in 2021, Johnson starred in Netflix's film Red Notice, written and directed by Rawson Marshall Thurber. It is the third time that the two collaborated, after Central Intelligence and Skyscraper. It co-stars Gal Gadot and Ryan Reynolds. Until the release of KPop Demon Hunters in 2025, it was the most watched film on Netflix of all time.

Johnson voiced Krypto the Superdog in the animated feature DC League of Super Pets (2022), which was released theatrically in July and emerged as a success. A film centered around Teth-Adam/Black Adam, as part of the DC Extended Universe, was announced to be in development in January 2017. Johnson was originally cast as Black Adam as early as September 2014 as the antagonist in Shazam!, a film centered around the superhero Billy Batson/Shazam, but this was ultimately reworked. Johnson did not appear in Shazam!, but he served as a producer and his likeness was used through special effects in flashback scenes. On November 14, 2019, he announced a late 2021 release date for the Black Adam film. Production on Black Adam ultimately began in April 2021 and the film was released on October 21, 2022. He earned $22.5 million to star in the film and received millions more for producing and promoting it on social media. However, the anticipated film received mixed to negative reviews and turned out to be a box office disappointment. Following the failure of Black Adam, Johnson's star power came under scrutiny, and his involvement in the film's creative decisions faced criticism.

In 2023, Johnson voiced his Moana character Maui in Disney crossover short film Once Upon a Studio. In May 2023, Johnson reprised his role as Luke Hobbs in a cameo appearance during the mid-credits scene of Fast X. By the early 2020s, Johnson faced some criticism for consistently portraying what were perceived as similar characters, often described as charismatic, larger-than-life figures who are both physically imposing and possess a dry wit. It was argued these roles frequently involved action or adventure elements, and the characters tended to be heroic, if sometimes reluctant, protagonists.

Johnson has been a member of the Academy of Motion Picture Arts and Sciences in the Actor's Branch since 2017; in 2024, he presented at the Academy Awards alongside Bad Bunny. In November 2024, Johnson reunited with director Jake Kasdan to star alongside Chris Evans, Lucy Liu, and J. K. Simmons, in the Christmas themed action comedy Red One, which didn't fare well both critically and financially. However, it became one of the top streamed movies of 2024 after its release on Amazon Prime. In the same month, he reprised his voice role of Maui from Moana (2016) in its sequel Moana 2. Despite receiving mixed reception, the film opened strongly and set several box office records. It eventually emerged as the third highest-grossing film of 2024.

=== Diversification (2025–present) ===
Johnson was next seen portraying former MMA fighter Mark Kerr in Benny Safdie's biographical sports drama The Smashing Machine (2025). Full facial prosthetics and a wig were used to transform Johnson's appearance to resemble Kerr. When asked about taking on a serious, intimate drama after years of big-budget action and comedy films, Johnson expressed excitement about finally exploring personal struggles on-screen that he had never before addressed. He described the process as both frightening and liberating. Critics noted that he used the opportunity to pivot his brand and persona toward that of a serious actor. The film premiered at the 82nd Venice International Film Festival on September 1, 2025. It received a standing ovation and Safdie won the Silver Lion. The film garnered positive reviews, with Nicholas Barber of the BBC describing Johnson's portrayal as "impressively vulnerable." The performance sparked discussions about a potential Oscar nomination for Johnson. It had its wide release on October 3, 2025, but was met with a poor theatrical response, and is understood to be Johnson's lowest grossing opening ever.

In 2026, Johnson reprised his role of Maui in the live action adaptation Moana (2026). He and his wife Lauren Hashian executive produced Moana: Voices Across the Ocean, a companion album by Pacific Island artists released on July 31, 2026, featuring songs inspired by the Moana films and a new version of "We Know the Way".

In February 2025, Johnson was cast in an upcoming crime drama film to be directed by Martin Scorsese, alongside Leonardo DiCaprio and Emily Blunt. The film would depict the mafia's influence in Hawaii, with Johnson portraying an aspiring mob boss who rises within the criminal underworld. He will reteam with Safdie for the film Lizard Music, based on the Daniel Pinkwater teen novel of the same name. In May 2025, it was announced that Johnson would star in a new feature from Darren Aronofsky called Breakthrough. In December 2025, it was announced that he would star in a film about movies being directed by J.J. Abrams. In July 2026, Deadline announced that Johnson would star in Free Byrd, an upcoming action-drama film directed by Greg Kwedar. The film is centered around a motorcycle stuntman who hides his diagnosis of dementia from his family in favor of one final jump. Free Byrd will be produced by Johnson and Ben Affleck's and Matt Damon's Artists Equity studio.

== Producing ==
In 2012, Johnson founded his production company Seven Bucks Productions. Though originally attached as producer and star, in 2018 it was reported Johnson would now serve solely as the former on a film adaptation of The Janson Directive. John Cena would fill the leading role, with Akiva Goldsman attached as screenwriter. Additionally, he was set to produce and star in a Netflix exclusive film titled John Henry & The Statesmen, as the titular folklore hero. The film would be directed by Jake Kasdan, from a script by Kasdan and Tom Wheeler. With the first official teaser trailer released in October 2018, the project would have marked Kasdan's and Johnson's third collaboration, after Jumanji: Welcome to the Jungle and Jumanji: The Next Level.

In 2019, Johnson produced and appeared as himself in Fighting with My Family, a comedy drama about Saraya Bevis and her family, who are also professional wrestlers. It was reported that Johnson would co-produce and star in The King, a film about king Kamehameha Kūnuiākea, founder and first ruler of the Kingdom of Hawaiʻi. The project would be directed by Robert Zemeckis from a script by Randall Wallace. The movie would be comparable to Braveheart in tone, given Wallace's work on both films, and would depict the king's role in resolving the wars among the islands of Hawaiʻi. The King was scheduled to begin production in 2020, but was halted by the COVID-19 pandemic. Johnson has also been attached to produce/star in a sequel to Big Trouble in Little China, as well as a project under development with Shane Black focusing on a new interpretation of Doc Savage.

In 2021, his biographical comedy-drama series Young Rock began airing on NBC.

== Business career ==
In March 2020, Johnson launched Teremana Tequila, which sold 600,000 nine-litre cases in its first year and is valued at approximately $3.5 billion.

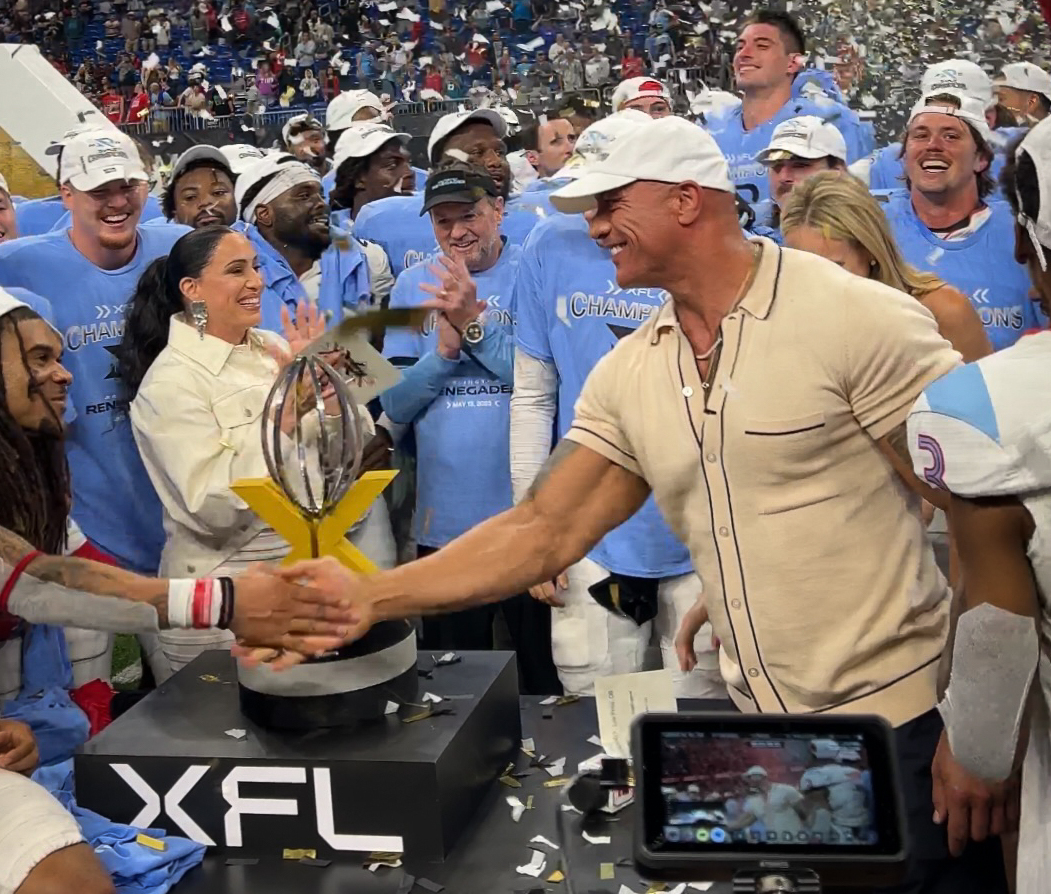
Johnson presenting the 2023 XFL Championship trophy

In August 2020, Johnson along with several partners and investors—including RedBird Capital Partners—purchased the XFL for $15 million. Within months, Johnson announced plans for the relaunch of the league in spring 2022. While the launch was delayed a year, the first games of 2023 kicked off on time. After a successful 2023 season, the XFL and United States Football League announced their intent to merge into a single league. On December 31, 2023, it was announced that the new merged league would be called the United Football League (UFL). The league would feature 8 teams and start on March 30, 2024. Johnson, along with Dany Garcia, and RedBird Capital Partners own 50% of the UFL together under XFL Properties LLC.

On January 23, 2024, Johnson joined the TKO Group Holdings board of directors. In the process, he obtained full ownership over his trademarked name "The Rock", which was owned by WWE. As part of the settlement, Johnson signed a new services and merchandising agreement with WWE.

== Other work ==
In 2000, Johnson published his autobiography, The Rock Says..., co-written with Joe Layden. It debuted at No. 1 on The New York Times Best Seller list and remained on the list for several weeks. In 2013, Johnson hosted and produced the TNT reality competition series The Hero. In 2014, he hosted another TNT reality series, Wake Up Call. In 2019, Johnson started hosting the NBC competition series The Titan Games.

In March 2016, Johnson partnered with American fitness apparel manufacturer Under Armour to release "Project Rock". The first item in his partnership with Under Armour, a gym bag, sold out in a couple of days. His second item, a black T-shirt sporting his signature "Brahma bull", sold out after being worn at WrestleMania 32. Johnson also released an alarm clock app as part of "Project Rock" that received more than one million downloads in its first week of release. Since then, they have released sneakers, headphones, and other apparel.

In 2016, Johnson started his YouTube channel. His first video, The YouTube Factory, featured online personality Lilly Singh and several other internet stars. In 2019, Johnson revealed plans to launch a competitive bodybuilding event called "Athleticon" alongside his business partner and ex-wife, Dany Garcia. It is set to rival other long-standing bodybuilding shows such as The Arnold Classic and Joe Weider's Mr. Olympia. The show was set to debut in October 2020 in Atlanta, Georgia, but plans were disrupted by the COVID-19 pandemic.

A fan of the rapper Tech N9ne, Johnson is featured on the song "Face Off" from the rapper's 2021 album Asin9ne.

== Activism and philanthropy ==
=== Politics ===
As part of WWE's non-partisan "Smackdown Your Vote" campaign aiming to encourage young people to vote, Johnson had a speaking role at the 2000 Republican National Convention and attended the 2000 Democratic National Convention less than two weeks later.

Johnson voted for Barack Obama in 2008 and 2012, but did not vote in 2016, and was an independent voter as of 2017. He endorsed Joe Biden in 2020, but told Fox News in an April 2024 interview that he regretted the decision due to it causing "division" and refused to endorse anyone in 2024.

Johnson has expressed interest in running for president, telling USA Today in February 2021 that he would "consider a presidential run in the future if that's what the people wanted". Following an online poll which found that 46% of Americans would consider voting for Johnson in an election, he told Today in April 2021, "I do have that goal to unite our country and I also feel that if this is what the people want, then I will do that".

=== Charity ===
Johnson has worked with the Make-A-Wish Foundation on a number of occasions. In 2021, Johnson dedicated his People's Choice Award to an Armenian cancer survivor.

In 2006, Johnson founded the Dwayne Johnson Rock Foundation, a charity working with at-risk and terminally ill children. In 2007, he and his then-wife, Dany Garcia, donated $1 million to the University of Miami to support the renovation of its football facilities; the university renamed the Miami Hurricanes' locker room in his honor.

In 2015, actress Michelle Trachtenberg tagged Johnson in a tweet about an abandoned dog that her local shelter had rescued and named after him, prompting him to donate $1,500 to the GoFundMe for the dog's lifesaving surgery. In 2017, he donated $25,000 to Hurricane Harvey relief efforts. In 2018, he donated a gym to a military base in Oahu, Hawaii. After the 2018 Hawaii floods, he worked with the nonprofit organization Malama Kauai to help repair flood damage.

Johnson made a seven-figure donation to the SAG-AFTRA Foundation during the 2023 SAG-AFTRA strike, which foundation president Courtney B. Vance cited as the largest single donation that the foundation had ever received from one individual at one time. The following month, Johnson and Oprah Winfrey announced the creation of the People's Fund of Maui in response to the 2023 Hawaii wildfires and asked people to donate. They also donated $5 million each to it. The announcement received backlash from fans, who criticized Johnson and Oprah for requesting donations while having net worths of $800 million and $2.5 billion respectively; Johnson apologized in October.

== Personal life ==
Johnson has experienced multiple episodes of depression, beginning in his college years. He has spoken publicly about the importance of seeking help and being open about mental health struggles, advocating for increased awareness and support.

In 2003, Johnson got a partial Samoan Peʻa tattoo on his left side. In August 2004, in recognition of his service to the Samoan people, and because he is a descendant of Samoan chiefs, Johnson was given the noble title Seiuli, meaning the son of Malietoa [Alo o Malietoa], by Malietoa Tanumafili II during his visit there. In 2017, Johnson had the small "Brahma bull" tattoo on his right arm covered with a larger half-sleeve tattoo of a bull's skull.

In 2009, Johnson obtained Canadian citizenship through his father's birth and citizenship there.

On May 1, 2011, Johnson was the second person to leak the news of Osama bin Laden's death. Shortly after U.S. Navy SEALs had killed bin Laden in a raid in Pakistan, Navy officer Keith Urbahn tweeted about it; (Note: He tweeted: "So I'm told by a reputable person they have killed Osama Bin Laden. Hot damn.") later that minute, Johnson tweeted: "Just got word that will shock the world - Land of the free...home of the brave DAMN PROUD TO BE AN AMERICAN!" U.S. president Barack Obama publicly announced the raid afterwards. Johnson later said that "a friend of a friend" had told him the news in a phone call.

Johnson is a supporter of the Samoa national rugby league team, and publicly pledged his support to the team during the 2021 Rugby League World Cup when the team made the finals for the first time.

=== Relationships ===
Johnson first met Dany Garcia when they were both University of Miami students in the early 1990s. They married on May 3, 1997. She is a businesswoman, International Fitness and Bodybuilding Federation professional bodybuilder, and producer. They have one child, Simone, a daughter, who was born August 14, 2001, in Davie, Florida. On June 1, 2007, Johnson and Garcia announced they were separating amicably. The divorce was finalized in May 2008.

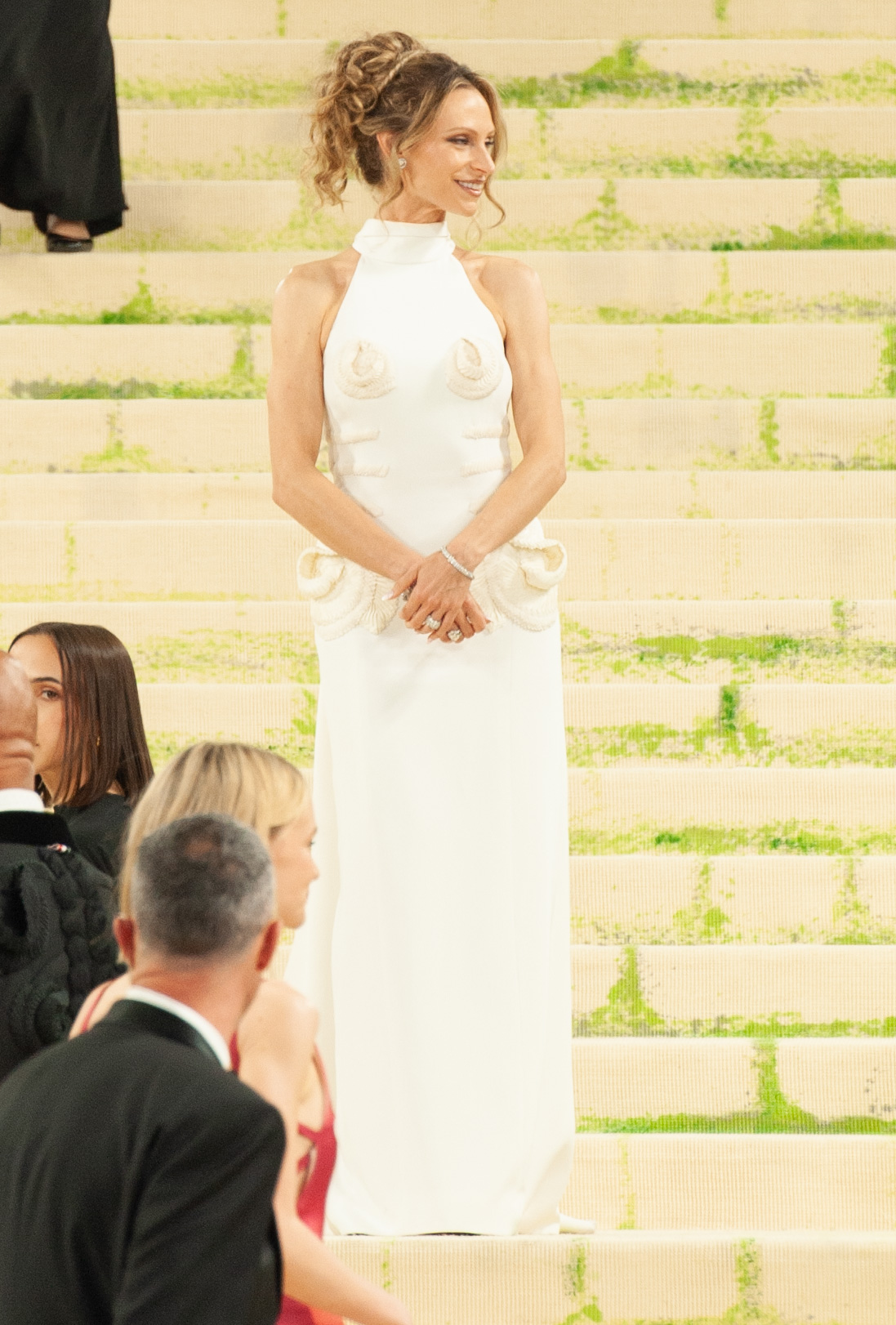
Lauren Hashian, Johnson's wife, at the 2026 Met Gala

In 2007, Johnson began dating Lauren Hashian, the daughter of Sib Hashian, the drummer for the band Boston. They met in 2006 while Johnson was filming The Game Plan. On August 18, 2019, Johnson and Hashian married in Hawaii. They have two daughters, Jasmine and Tiana, and live in Los Angeles. They also maintain a farm in Virginia and a home in Southwest Ranches, Florida. Alongside Johnson, Jasmine and Tiana provided voices for Moana 2.

In February 2020, WWE announced that Johnson's daughter Simone had started training at the WWE Performance Center, making her the first fourth-generation WWE wrestler. On May 16, Johnson announced she had signed a contract with WWE, and announced in May 2022 that her ring name would be Ava Raine. She appeared with the NXT brand until January 2026 when she opted not to renew her WWE contract.

== Discography ==
=== Singles ===
==== As lead artist ====
List of singles as lead artist, with selected chart positions
| Title | Year | Peak chart positions | | Certifications | Album |
| Title | Year | US | CAN | Certifications | Album |
|---|---|---|---|---|---|
| "You're Welcome" | 2016 | 83 | 85 | RIAA: 6× Platinum; BPI: 3× Platinum | Moana: Original Motion Picture Soundtrack |

==== As featured artist ====
List of singles as featured artist, with selected chart positions
| Title | Year | Peak chart positions | | | Album |
| Title | Year | US Bub. | US R&B /HH | CAN | Album |
|---|---|---|---|---|---|
| "It Doesn't Matter" (Wyclef Jean featuring the Rock and Melky Sedeck) | 2000 | — | 80 | — (Note: "It Doesn't Matter" did not enter the Canadian Hot 100, but peaked at number eight on the Hot Canadian Digital Singles chart.) | The Ecleftic: 2 Sides II a Book |
| "Face Off" (Tech N9ne featuring Joey Cool, King Iso, and Dwayne Johnson) | 2021 | 4 | 45 | 77 | Asin9ne |

== Championships and accomplishments ==
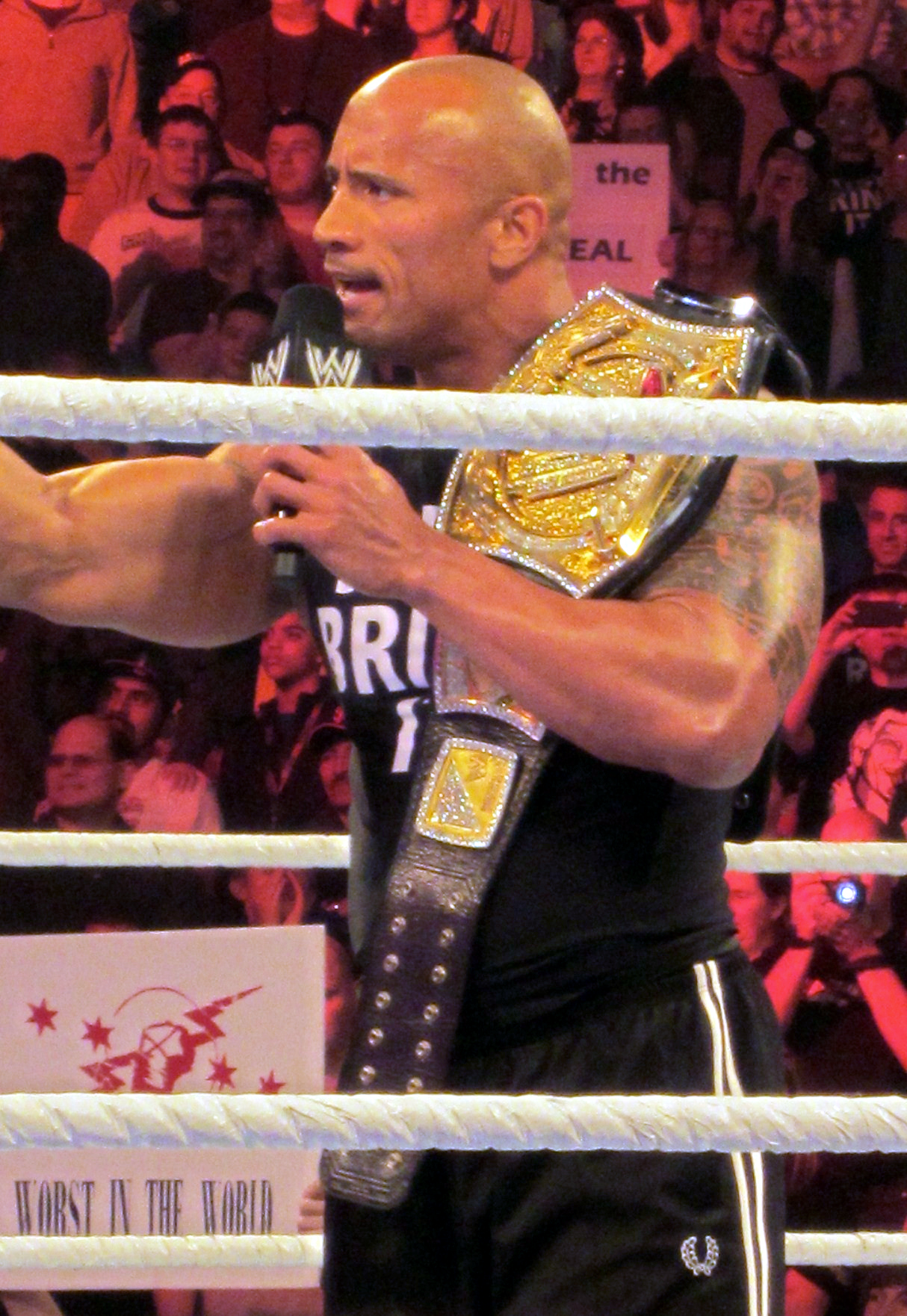
The Rock in Nashville during his eighth and to date last WWE Championship reign, February 2013

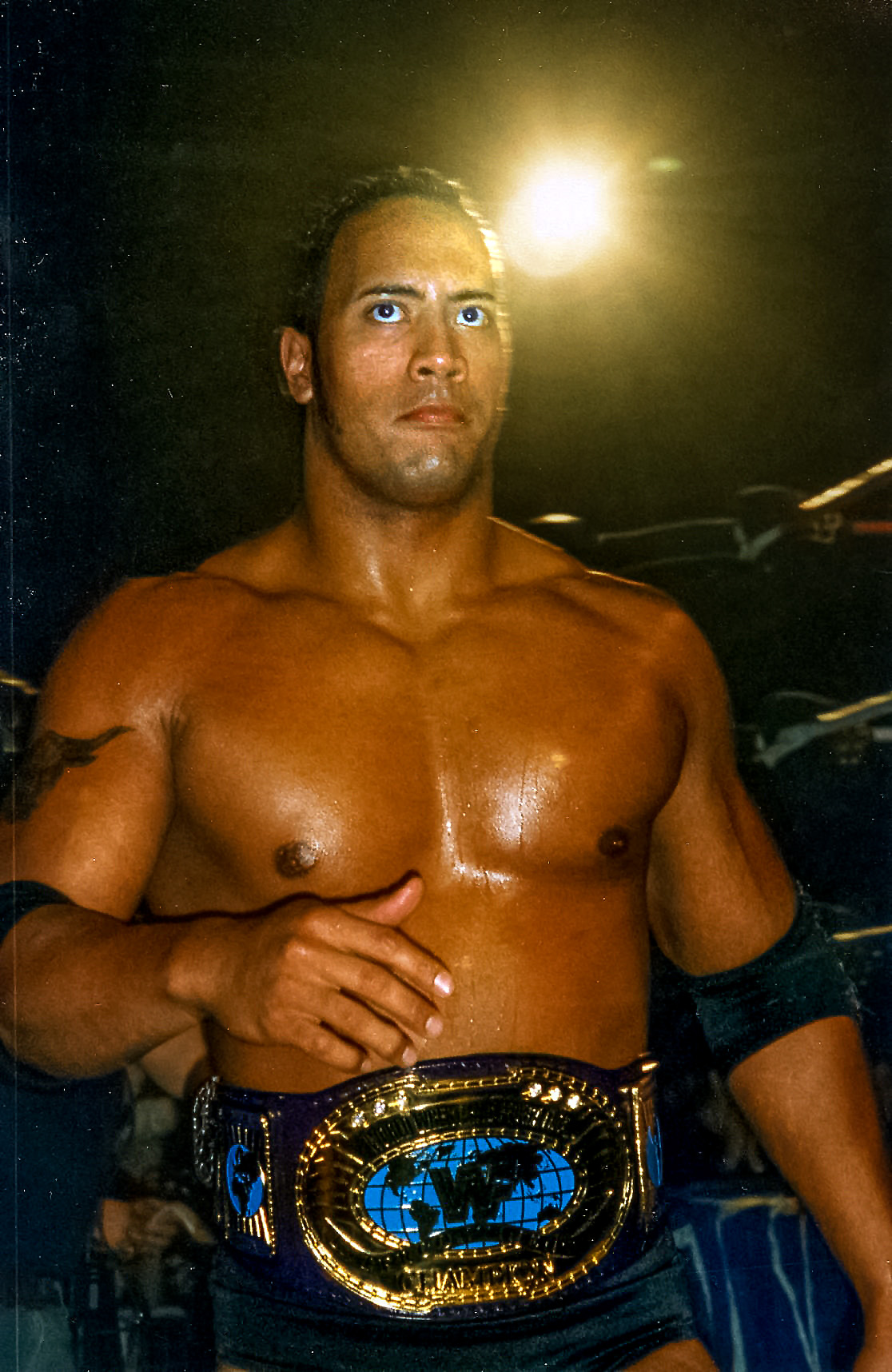
The Rock at Mayhem in Manchester in Manchester, England, during one of his two Intercontinental Championship reigns, April 1998

- Pro Wrestling Illustrated
  - Match of the Year (1999) vs. Mankind in an "I Quit" match at Royal Rumble
  - Match of the Year (2002) vs. Hollywood Hulk Hogan at WrestleMania X8
  - Most Popular Wrestler of the Year (1999, 2000)
  - Wrestler of the Year (2000)
  - Ranked No. 2 of the top 500 singles wrestlers in the PWI 500 in 2000
- Sports Illustrated
  - Ranked No. 3 of the 20 Greatest WWE Wrestlers Of All Time
- United States Wrestling Association
  - USWA World Tag Team Championship (2 times) – with Bart Sawyer
- Wrestling Observer Newsletter
  - Best Box Office Draw (2000, 2011, 2012)
  - Best Gimmick (1999)
  - Best on Interviews (1999, 2000)
  - Most Charismatic (1999–2002, 2011, 2012, 2024)
  - Most Improved (1998)
  - Wrestling Observer Newsletter Hall of Fame (Class of 2007)
- WWE/World Wrestling Entertainment/Federation
  - WWE Championship (Note: The title was named the WWF Championship during The Rock's first six reigns. It was known as the WWE Undisputed Championship during his seventh reign and as the WWE Championship during his eighth.) (8 times)
  - WCW Championship (Note: The title was renamed the World Championship during his second reign.) (2 times)
  - WWF Intercontinental Championship (2 times)
  - WWF Tag Team Championship (5 times) – with Mankind (3), The Undertaker (1), and Chris Jericho (1)
  - Royal Rumble (2000)
  - Sixth Triple Crown Champion
  - Deadly Games WWF Championship Tournament (1998)
  - Slammy Award (10 times)
    - Best Actor (2014)
    - Game Changer of the Year (2011) – with John Cena
    - Guess Who's Back or: Return of the Year (2011)
    - LOL! Moment of the Year (2012, 2013) – insulting John Cena using the history of Boston, Massachusetts, Rock Concert on the 20th anniversary episode of Raw
    - Match of the Year (2013) – vs. John Cena for the WWE Championship at WrestleMania 29
    - New Sensation (1997)
    - "Tell Me You Didn't Just Say That" Insult of the Year (2014) – insulting Rusev and Lana
    - "This is Awesome" Moment of the Year (2015) – with Ronda Rousey
    - Trash Talker of the Year (2024)

== Awards and honors ==
| Organizations | Year | Category | Nominated work | Result | Ref. |
|---|---|---|---|---|---|
| CinemaCon | 2012 | Action Star of the Year | Himself | Honored | |
| Golden Globe Awards | 2026 | Best Actor in a Motion Picture – Drama | The Smashing Machine | Nominated | |
| Hollywood Walk of Fame | 2017 | Motion Picture star | Himself | Honored | |
| Kids' Choice Awards | 2013 | Favorite Male Buttkicker | Journey 2: The Mysterious Island | Won | |
| Kids' Choice Awards | 2017 | BFF's (shared with Kevin Hart) | Central Intelligence | Won | |
| Kids' Choice Awards | 2018 | Favorite Movie Actor | Jumanji: Welcome to the Jungle | Won | |
| Kids' Choice Awards | 2025 | Favorite Male Animated Voice from a Movie | Moana 2 | Won | |
| Mr. Olympia | 2016 | Icon Award | Himself | Honored | |
| MTV Movie & TV Awards | 2019 | MTV Generation Award | Himself | Honored | |
| Muscle & Fitness | 2015 | Man of the Century | Himself | Honored | |
| NAACP Image Awards | 2017 | Entertainer of the Year | Himself | Honored | |
| NCAA National Championship | 1991 | Football | Miami Hurricanes | Won | |
| Palm Springs International Film Festival | 2026 | Variety Creative Impact in Acting Award | The Smashing Machine | Won | |
| People Magazine | 2016 | Sexiest Man Alive | Himself | Honored | |
| People's Choice Awards | 2016 | Favorite Premium Cable TV Actor | Himself | Won | |
| People's Choice Awards | 2017 | Favorite Premium Series Actor | Himself | Won | |
| Razzie Awards | 2018 | So Rotten You Loved It | Baywatch | Won | |
| Shorty Awards | 2016 | Best Actor | Himself | Won | |
| Streamy Awards | 2023 | Collaboration (shared with MrBeast) | "Surprised he didn't pick rock every time" | Won | |
| Teen Choice Awards | 2001 | Choice Movie: Villain | The Mummy Returns | Won | |
| Teen Choice Awards | 2017 | Choice Fantasy Movie Actor | Moana | Won | |
| Teen Choice Awards | 2018 | Choice Comedy Movie Actor | Jumanji: Welcome to the Jungle | Won | |
| Time Magazine | 2016 | 100 Most Influential People in the World | Himself | Honored | |
| Time Magazine | 2019 | 100 Most Influential People in the World | Himself | Honored | |
| United States 1st Armored Division | 2019 | Tank named in his honor | Himself | Honored | |
| The Walt Disney Company | 2026 | Disney Legends | Himself | Honored | |
