= Josh Shipp (media personality) =

American motivational speaker

- Born: January 20, 1982 (age 44) Oklahoma City, Oklahoma, United States
- Occupation: Author, Youth Speaker, TV Personality
- Period: 1999–present
- Subject: Youth Advocacy

Website
- joshshipp.com

Josh Shipp (born January 20, 1982) is an American motivational speaker for teachers, best-selling author, and TV personality. He is most known for his TEDx talk entitled "Every Kid is One Caring Adult Away from Being a Success Story" and his television programs including Teen Trouble which aired on Lifetime and A&E executive produced by Ellen Rakieten of The Oprah Winfrey Show.

Josh was president of Oklahoma DECA in high school and began speaking professionally at the age of 17. He has since spoken at large events such as the National FFA convention and the SADD National Convention. Josh has been a spokesperson for National Foster Care Month, wrote a teen advice column for Cosmogirl!, and appeared as a teen advice correspondent on MTV‘s Total Request Live.

His recent work focuses on the impact parents, teachers, and caring adults have in the life of a child. He is the founder of Top Youth Speakers, an education speakers bureau.

== Television shows ==
Year	Program	Description
2009	Jump Shipp	Role: Host. 11-part documentary series airing on Halogen in which people stuck in dead-end jobs get a once-in-a-lifetime opportunity to press restart.
2012	Teen Trouble	Role: Host. 8-part documentary series airing on Lifetime and A&E follows Josh Shipp as he works to improve the lives of at-risk teenagers across the country.
2014	Wake Up Call	Role: Guest Expert. Dwayne "The Rock" Johnson and teen expert Josh Shipp must cut through the tension in this caustic mother-daughter relationship. But first they challenge young Alyssa with eye-opening realities that land the high-schooler in prison.
2018	Undercover High	Role: Consultant. Undercover High follows seven twenty somethings posing as typical students as they embed for a semester at Highland Park High School in Topeka, Kansas. From bullying and the pervasiveness of social media to the struggle to excel in the classroom and navigate evolving social standards, participants discover the challenges and complexities, both new and familiar, facing today's teens.

=== Other television appearances ===
Josh has also appeared as a guest on Good Morning America, Take Part Live, The Steve Harvey Show, Anderson Cooper Live, The Jeff Probst Show, and others to discuss issues related to teens, parents, and teachers.

== Books ==
- The Teen's Guide to World Domination: Advice on Life, Liberty, and the Pursuit of Awesomeness, St. Martins Press ISBN 0312641540
- Jump Ship: Ditch Your Dead-End Job and Turn Your Passion into a Profession, St. Martins Press ISBN 0312646739
- The Grown-Up's Guide to Teenage Humans: How to Decode Their Behavior, Develop Unshakable Trust, and Raise a Respectable Adult, Harper Wave ISBN 0062654063
- No Matter What: A Foster Care Tale, Familius ISBN 1641702532
