= Grist Mill Bridge (Lebanon, Maine) =

- U.S. National Register of Historic Places
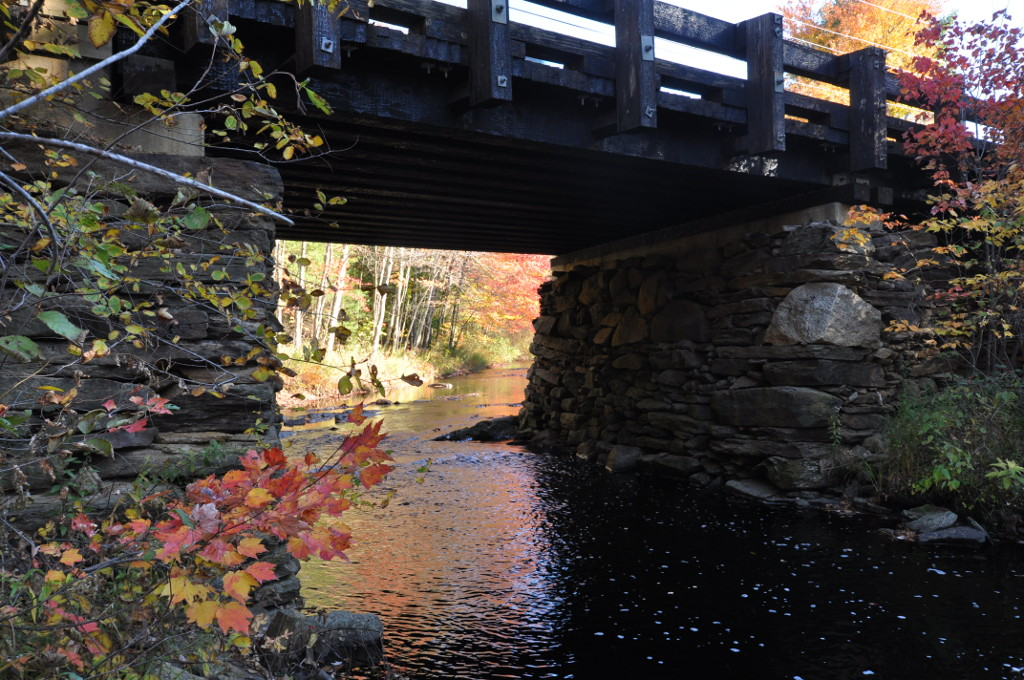

- Location within Maine Location within the United States
- Nearest city: Lebanon, Maine
- Coordinates: 43°23′30″N 70°51′6″W
- Area: less than one acre
- Built: 1885
- NRHP reference No.: 90001905
- Added to NRHP: December 27, 1990

The Grist Mill Bridge is a historic bridge in Lebanon, Maine, carrying Little River Road across the Little River. Although the bridge has a 20th-century wooden deck on rubblestone abutments and pier, it is functionally similar to the bridge's original deck, which was also a wooden structure that may have existed as early as 1774. The bridge was listed on the National Register of Historic Places as a rare example of a bridge in the state with some essential 18th-century elements intact.

== Description and history ==
The Grist Mill Bridge is located in a rural part of far eastern Lebanon. The Little River Road runs generally southward, roughly following the course of the eponymous river as it makes its way south to the Salmon Falls River in Berwick. A short way south of the Lebanon-North Berwick Baptist Church, the road crosses the river at a point where it makes an S-shaped bend to the west. Just downstream (west) of the bridge stands the Old Grist Mill, which was built in 1774. Documents describing this mill indicate that a bridge was already standing at this location when it was built. State records of the bridge include photographic evidence from 1924, and records noting replacement of its deck in 1885. Documentary references to bridges at or near this location were also made in 1792 and 1822, but none of the documentation predating 1885 is conclusively connected to the present structure. The stonework of the bridge supports bears some resemblance to that of the mill foundation and what remains of its dam.

The bridge's oldest features are its abutments and single pier, all of which are dry laid rubblestone. These elements place the wooden bridge deck about 13 feet (4.0 m) above typical water level. The southern abutment includes a wing wall that extends for some 50 feet (15 m) as a base and retaining wall for the roadway. The bridge deck is 54 feet (16 m) long and about 13 feet (4.0 m) wide.

== See also ==
- National Register of Historic Places listings in York County, Maine
- List of bridges on the National Register of Historic Places in Maine
