= J.L. Prescott House =

Historic house in Maine, United States

- J. L. Prescott House
- U.S. National Register of Historic Places
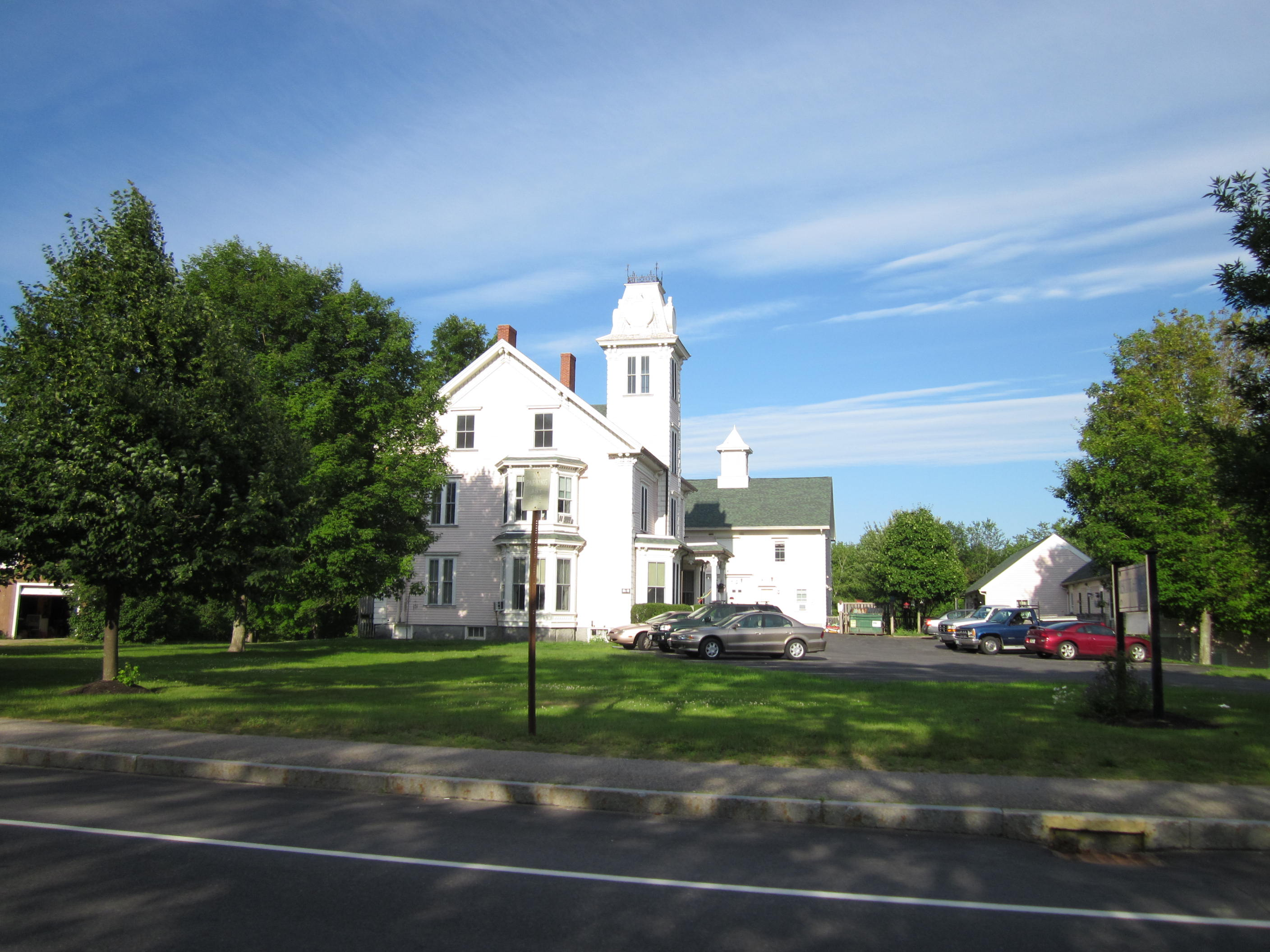

- Location within Maine Location within the United States
- Location: High St., North Berwick, Maine
- Coordinates: 43°18′39″N 70°44′19″W
- Area: 1 acre (0.40 ha)
- Built: 1865
- Architectural style: Italianate
- NRHP reference No.: 85001268
- Added to NRHP: June 20, 1985

The J.L. Prescott House is a historic house on High Street in North Berwick, Maine. Built in 1865 for a prominent local businessman, it is one of the largest and most elaborate Italianate houses in southern Maine. It was listed on the National Register of Historic Places in 1985. It has been converted into a multiunit apartment house.

== Description and history ==
The Prescott House is located on the east side of High Street (Maine State Route 4), opposite the Mary R. Hurd School north of the village center of North Berwick. It is a rambling wood-frame structure, with a large 2 1/2-story main block connected to a large carriage barn via a telescoping series of ells. The main block is oriented facing south, with a side gable roof and a four-story tower with a mansard roof projecting slightly from the center bay. Window bays with bracketed roofs project from the south and west sides, and most windows are paired narrow sash topped by cornices. Both the main block and carriage barn have wooden corner quoining. Porches feature chamfered posts, and bracketed roofs with pendants.

The house was built in 1865 for J.L. Prescott, owner of the Prescott Stove Polish Company, which was then located in North Berwick. The house is one of only two 19th-century houses of serious architectural merit; the other is the Queen Anne Mary R. Hurd House. Although Prescott was involved in state politics, he moved (along with his company) to New Jersey in the 1880s. After declining in condition during the 20th century, the house has been restored to house several apartments.

== See also ==
- National Register of Historic Places listings in York County, Maine
