= Berwick, Maine (disambiguation) =

Berwick, Maine (disambiguation) may refer to:

- Berwick, Maine
- North Berwick, Maine
- South Berwick, Maine
