= Old Grist Mill =

- U.S. National Register of Historic Places
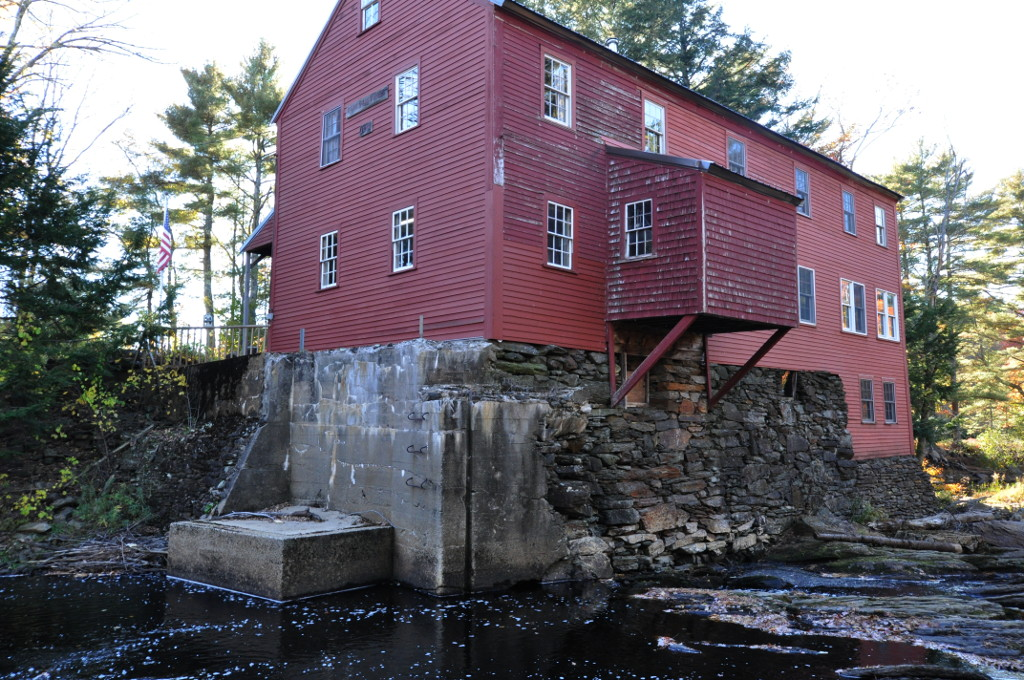

- Location within Maine Location within the United States
- Location: Little River Rd., East Lebanon, Maine
- Coordinates: 43°23′31″N 70°51′5″W
- Area: 2 acres (0.81 ha)
- Built: 1774
- NRHP reference No.: 75000118
- Added to NRHP: June 5, 1975

The Old Grist Mill is a historic mill building on Little River Road in eastern Lebanon, Maine. Built in 1774, it is the town's oldest surviving industrial building, and was in operation as a mill into the 20th century. The building, listed on the National Register of Historic Places in 1975, has been converted into a residence and retail/artist space.

== Description and history ==
The Old Grist Mill is located on the south side of the Little River, in a rural eastern part of Lebanon. It is a 2-1/2 story wood frame structure, with a gable roof and a massive stone foundation that has been reinforced with concrete. Its framing members are hand-hewn timbers, about 13 inches (33 cm) square and as much as 22 feet (6.7 m) in length. A small single room extends beyond the foundation over the river.

The mill was built in 1774 by Joseph Hardison. Originally built as a grist (flour) mill, it was over time adapted to also to produce wooden shingles and clapboarding. The mill also served as a community meeting point, housing a small store and as a place for posting public notices. The advent of railroad transportation and the decline in farming in the area led to its closure in the 1870s. It underwent a restoration in the 1970s, using electricity instead of water as its power source, but has since been converted into residential space with room for a small shop or artist's studio.

Just downstream from the mill, the Little River Road crosses the river on the Grist Mill Bridge, whose foundation may also have been built by Hardison.

== See also ==
- National Register of Historic Places listings in York County, Maine
