= Hussey Plow Company Building =

- U.S. National Register of Historic Places
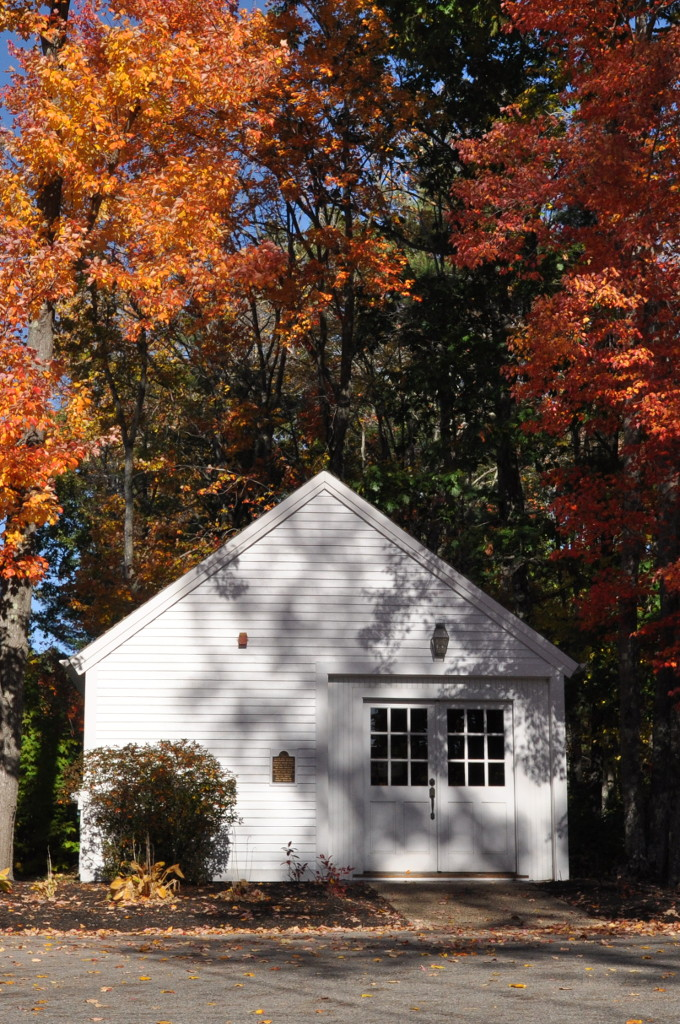

- Location within Maine Location within the United States
- Location: Dyer St., North Berwick, Maine
- Coordinates: 43°18′15″N 70°43′45″W
- Area: 1 acre (0.40 ha)
- Built: 1831
- NRHP reference No.: 79000181
- Added to NRHP: December 19, 1979

The Hussey Plow Company Building is a historic industrial building on Dyer Street in North Berwick, Maine. Built in 1831, this small wood-frame building originally housed the offices of the Hussey Plow Company, now known as the Hussey Seating Company, a major manufacturer of bleachers and outdoor seating. The building, which now houses the company museum, was listed on the National Register of Historic Places in 1979.

== Description and history ==
The Hussey Plow Company Building is located at the end of Dyer Street, one of the main access roads to the Hussey Seating factory on the southeast side of North Berwick's village center. It is a simple rectangular wood-frame structure, with a front facing gable roof and clapboard siding. The front facade, facing south, has a double door set in a recessed opening on its right side. Although there are no windows on the front, each of the side and rear elevations has two windows. The building was built in 1831.

The Hussey Seating Company's origins are in the development of a more efficient plow by William Hussey (1800–70) in the 1830s. His son Timothy established the T.B. Hussey Plow Company, which manufactured the metal parts for the plows in Newmarket, New Hampshire, and the wooden parts in North Berwick. Although plows were a major portion of its business throughout the 19th century, the company was by the start of the 20th century producing steel ladders and fire escapes, as well as metal parts for use in textile operations. In the 1930s the company developed wooden bleacher seat assemblies, which were refined in the 1950s to provide indoor rollout gymnasium seating that is now standard in many school facilities. This small building, originally used as an office, now houses a small museum.

== See also ==
- National Register of Historic Places listings in York County, Maine
