= Frederick Hayes =

American military officer (1842–1911)

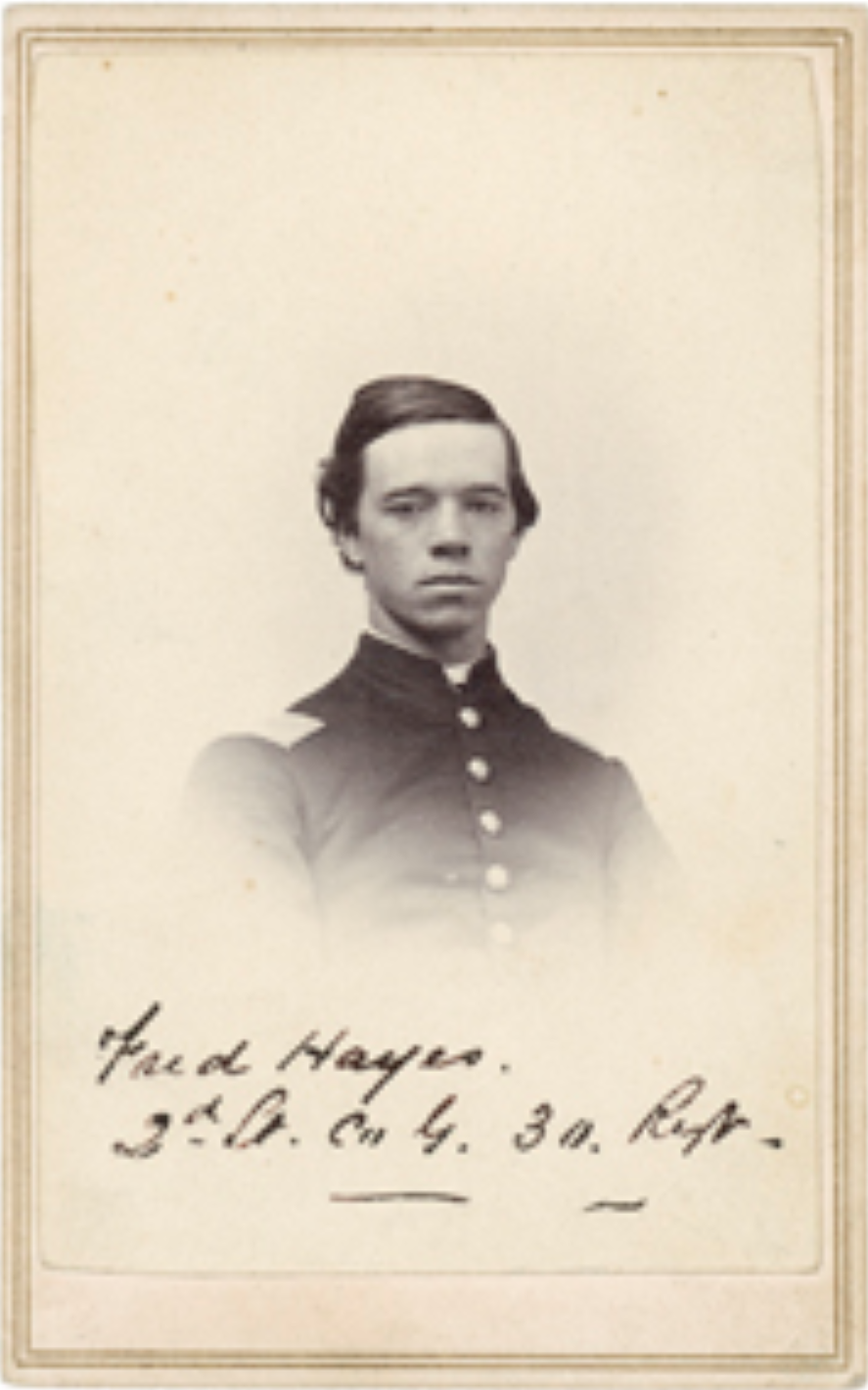
- Born: 1842; Berwick, Maine, U.S.
- Died: 1911 (aged 68–69)
- Education: Bates College (Maine State Seminary)
- Relatives: John Alfred Hayes (brother); Benjamin Franklin Hayes (brother)
- Military career
- Allegiance: United States
- Branch: Union Army
- Rank: Second Lieutenant
- Commands: 30th Maine Volunteer Infantry Regiment, 5th Maine Volunteer Infantry, 27th Maine Volunteer Infantry Regiment
- Conflicts: American Civil War

Frederick Hayes (1842-1911) was an American military officer, Union Army engineer, and early manager of Pfizer who served in the American Civil War and was awarded a Medal of Honor.

Frederick Hayes, Jr. was born in Berwick, Maine in 1842 to Sarah Hurd and Frederick Hayes, Sr. (1806-1889), a large farmer and lumber dealer, who was active in the Free Will Baptist Church and Whig/Republican parties. Hayes grew up working on the family farm in Berwick and attended the Maine State Seminary (later renamed Bates College) in Lewiston, Maine.

During the Civil War, Hayes served as a sergeant in 5th Maine Volunteer Infantry before being promoted to second lieutenant in the 27th Maine Volunteer Infantry Regiment. While serving he was part of the "Maine State Seminary Camp Club" where former Bates students participated in academic exercises such as "declamations and other exercises." In 1863 he was extended the nation's highest honor, the Medal of Honor for volunteering to extend his service after his enlistment term expired and to defend Washington at President Lincoln's request when Robert E. Lee invaded the North culminating in the Battle of Gettysburg. Hayes then enlisted in the 30th Maine Volunteer Infantry Regiment was honorably discharged in September 1864 for disability.

After the War, Hayes worked in management during the early years of Pfizer Chemical Works in New York until retiring in 1909. He was active in the G.A.R. and Order of the Amaranth. Hayes died in Brooklyn, New York in 1911 and was buried in Cypress Hills Cemetery. He was survived by his wife, Elizabeth Pearkes whom he had married in 1887. In February 1917, the Medal of Honor review board removed 911 names from the honor roll, including all the medals awarded to the 27th Maine. Several of Hayes' older brothers were also Civil War veterans, including Dr. John Alfred Hayes, a prominent Union surgeon, and Benjamin Franklin Hayes, a notable attorney and legislator from Medford, Massachusetts.
