= Mark F. and Eliza J. Wentworth House =

Historic house in Maine, United States

- U.S. National Register of Historic Places
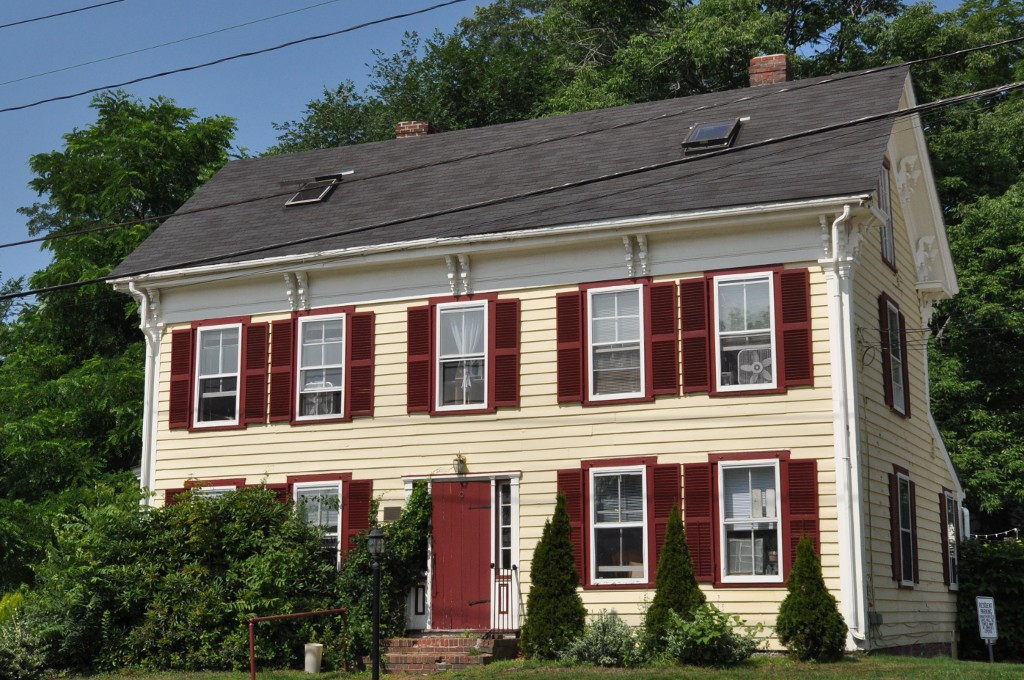

- Location within Maine Location within the United States
- Location: 9 Wentworth St., Kittery Foreside, Maine
- Coordinates: 43°5′12″N 70°44′36″W
- Area: less than one acre
- Built: 1866
- Architectural style: Italianate, Greek Revival
- NRHP reference No.: 97001643
- Added to NRHP: January 7, 1998

The Mark F. and Eliza J. Wentworth House is a historic house at 9 Wentworth Street in Kittery, Maine. Probably built in the second quarter of the 19th century and given Italianate styling c. 1866, it is notable for its association with Mark Fernald Wentworth, a distinguished physician and decorated veteran of the American Civil War. The house was listed on the National Register of Historic Places in 1998.

== Description and history ==
The Wentworth House is located on the west side of Wentworth Street (Maine State Route 103) in the village of Kittery Foreside, shortly after the road makes a sharp turn to the north. It is a 2 1/2-story wood-frame structure, five bays wide, with a side-gable roof, single off-center chimney, clapboard siding, and a brick foundation. The building corners are pilasters, and the eave has a wide frieze board with paired decorative brackets. The main facade, facing east, is symmetrical, with the center entrance flanked by sidelight windows and narrow pilasters. A single-story bay window projects from the left facade, with panels beneath the windows. A two-story ell extends to the main block's rear. The interior has retained a significant amount of its decorative work, despite having been used at times as a multi-unit apartment house, and as a doctor's office.

The house was probably built sometime between 1825 and 1840, and basically follows a Greek Revival center hall plan, with Italianate styling applied to it in the 1860s. The house was home from the mid-1860s to their deaths of Mark F. and Eliza Wentworth. Mark Wentworth was a Kittery native who was trained as a physician, but also maintained an interest in military affairs, serving in the local militia company. When the American Civil War broke out, he first served as storekeeper at the Portsmouth Navy Yard. In 1862 he raised the 27th Maine Infantry, which served in the defense of Washington, D.C. After its service ended, he raised the 32nd Maine Infantry, which served in military campaigns in Virginia. Wentworth was injured at the Siege of Petersburg in 1864, and resigned his commission in November of that year. He received a brevet promotion to brigadier general for his meritorious service at the end of the war. In addition to his medical practice, he also served several terms in the state legislature. He died at his Kittery home in 1897, having previously buried his wife and daughter.

== See also ==
- National Register of Historic Places listings in York County, Maine
