= Alphonso M. Lunt =

Alphonso Lunt
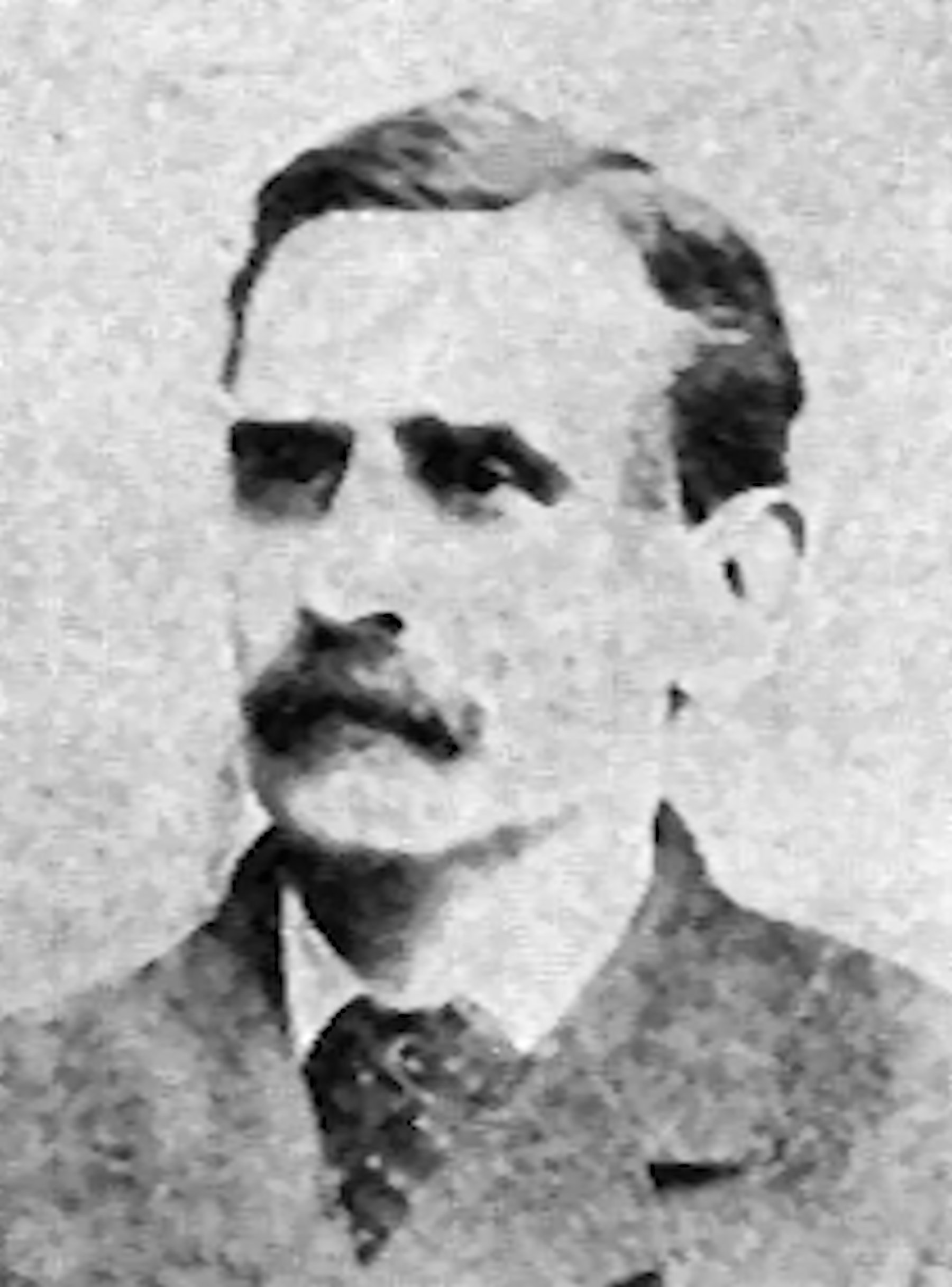
- Alphonso Lunt, Medal of Honor recipient
- Born: September 6, 1837; Berwick, Maine
- Died: December 18, 1917 (aged 80)
- Burial place: Cambridge, Massachusetts
- Military career
- Allegiance: United States of America; Union
- Branch: United States Army; Union Army
- Rank: Sergeant
- Units: Company F, 38th Massachusetts Volunteer Infantry Regiment
- Conflicts: American Civil War
- Awards: Medal of Honor

Alphonso Lunt (September 6, 1837 – December 18, 1917) was a sergeant in the Union Army and a Medal of Honor recipient for his actions at the First Battle of Lexington during the American Civil War.

== Medal of Honor citation ==
Rank and organization: Sergeant, Company F, 38th Massachusetts Infantry. Place and date: At Opequon Creek, Virginia, September 19, 1864. Entered service at: Cambridge, Massachusetts. Birth: Berwick, Maine. Date of issue: May 10, 1894.

Citation:

Carried his flag to the most advanced position where, left almost alone close to the enemy's lines he refused their demand to surrender, withdrew at great personal peril, and saved his flag.

== See also ==
- List of American Civil War Medal of Honor recipients: G–L
