= Mary R. Hurd House =

Historic building in Maine, US

- U.S. National Register of Historic Places
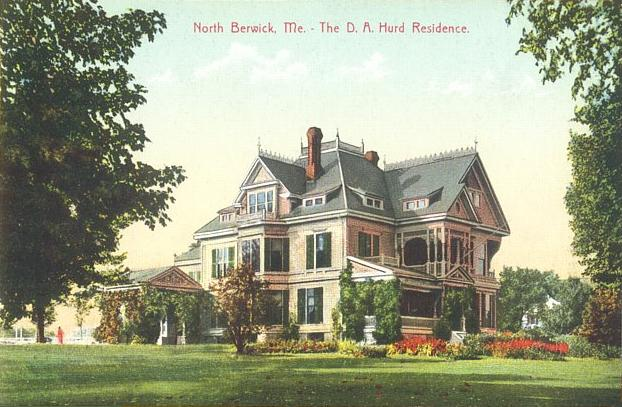

- Location within Maine Location within the United States
- Location: Elm Street, North Berwick, Maine
- Coordinates: 43°18′19″N 70°44′22″W
- Area: 0.5 acres (0.20 ha)
- Built: 1894
- Architectural style: Queen Anne
- NRHP reference No.: 79000180
- Added to NRHP: September 11, 1979

The Mary R. Hurd House is a historic house at 2 Elm Street in North Berwick, Maine. Built in 1894, the house is architecturally one of the finest Queen Anne/Eastlake houses in southern Maine. It was built by Mary Hurd, who was the proprietor of the North Berwick Woolen Mill for nearly 60 years, and a major benefactor to the town. Now a bed and breakfast inn, the house was listed on the National Register of Historic Places on September 11, 1979.

== Description and history ==
The Hurd House is located on the west side of Elm Street (Maine State Route 4), near its junction with Wells Street (Maine State Route 9) in the center of North Berwick. It is a large 2 1/2-story wood-frame structure, with asymmetrical massing and a busy roofline typical of the Queen Anne style. It has three elaborately decorated chimneys, an iron-crested slate roof with balustraded widow's walk, clapboard siding, and a granite foundation. The main entrance is located near the center of the east-facing front facade, sheltered by a porch that extends to the southern corner on the first floor, and is topped by a smaller porch on the second floor. Both porches are supported by groups of turned columns, with latticework valances and turned balustrades. To the right of the entrance a window bay, squared on the first floor and polygonal on the second, projects slightly.

The house was built in 1894 by Mary R. Hurd, at the time of her second marriage, to Daniel Hurd. Born in 1839 to William Hill, she inherited the North Berwick Woolen Mill upon his death in 1873, and ran the business until her own death in 1933 at age 94. She was a major philanthropic force in the town, funding construction of a fire station and purchase of a fire truck, and funding the construction and endowment of the D. A. Hurd Library. She also notably kept the mills running in the early years of the Great Depression, despite the poor business conditions. The property is now operated as The Lady Mary Inn at Hurd Manor.

== See also ==
- National Register of Historic Places listings in York County, Maine
