= Jumanji (film) =

1995 film directed by Joe Johnston

- Theatrical release poster
- Directed by: Joe Johnston
- Screenplay by: Jonathan Hensleigh; Greg Taylor; Jim Strain
- Story by: Greg Taylor; Jim Strain; Chris Van Allsburg
- Based on: Jumanji by Chris Van Allsburg
- Produced by: Scott Kroopf; William Teitler
- Starring: Robin Williams; Kirsten Dunst; David Alan Grier; Bonnie Hunt; Jonathan Hyde; Bebe Neuwirth
- Cinematography: Thomas E. Ackerman
- Edited by: Robert Dalva
- Music by: James Horner
- Production companies: TriStar Pictures; Interscope Communications; Golden Mean Productions
- Distributed by: Sony Pictures Releasing
- Release dates: December 10, 1995 (Culver City); December 15, 1995 (United States)
- Running time: 104 minutes
- Country: United States
- Language: English
- Budget: $65 million
- Box office: $263 million

Jumanji is a 1995 American fantasy adventure film directed by Joe Johnston from a screenplay by Jonathan Hensleigh, Greg Taylor, and Jim Strain, based on the 1981 children's picture book by Chris Van Allsburg. The film is the first installment in the Jumanji film series and stars Robin Williams, Kirsten Dunst, David Alan Grier, Bonnie Hunt, Jonathan Hyde, and Bebe Neuwirth. The story centers on a supernatural board game that unleashes jungle-based hazards on its players with every turn they take. The film was produced by Interscope Communications and Golden Mean Productions, and distributed by Sony Pictures Releasing through its TriStar Pictures label.

Jumanji premiered on December 10, 1995, in Culver City, California, and went into general release on December 15. The film received mixed reviews from critics, but was a box office success, grossing $263 million worldwide on a budget of approximately $65 million. It was the tenth highest-grossing film of 1995.

The film spawned an animated television series that aired from 1996 to 1999, and was followed by a spin-off film, Zathura: A Space Adventure (2005), and two sequels, Jumanji: Welcome to the Jungle (2017) and Jumanji: The Next Level (2019), with a third and final sequel, Jumanji: Open World, set to be released in 2026.

== Plot ==
In 1969, Alan Parrish lives in Brantford, New Hampshire, with his wealthy parents, Sam and Carol, who own Parrish Shoe, the largest employer in the town. One day, he escapes a group of bullies and retreats to Sam's shoe factory. His friend Carl Bentley reveals a new shoe prototype he made himself. Alan inadvertently misplaces the prototype on a conveyor belt, causing damage to both the shoe and a factory machine, but Carl takes responsibility and is dismissed. After the bullies accost Alan and steal his bicycle, he follows the sound of tribal drumbeats to a construction site. He finds a board game, Jumanji, which was buried 100 years earlier, and brings it home.

That night, Sam and Alan argue bitterly over whether Alan is to attend a prestigious private boarding school; Alan plans to run away, just as his friend, Sarah Whittle, returns his bicycle. Alan shows her Jumanji and invites her to play. With each dice roll, the game pieces move by themselves and a cryptic message describing the roll's outcome appears in the crystal ball at the center of the board. After Alan inadvertently rolls, a message tells him to wait in a jungle until someone rolls a five or eight and he is sucked into the game. Shortly after, a colony of bats pursues Sarah out of the mansion.

Twenty-six years later, Judy and Peter Shepherd move into the now-vacant Parrish mansion with their aunt Nora after their parents died in an accident the previous winter on a ski trip in Canada. Judy and Peter begin playing Jumanji after discovering it in the attic. Their rolls summon giant mosquitoes and a troop of monkeys. The game rules state that everything will be restored when the game ends, so they continue playing. Peter rolls a five, releasing a lion and an adult Alan. While making his way out, Alan encounters Carl, now working as a police officer. At the abandoned shoe factory, Alan, Judy and Peter discover that after Alan disappeared, Sam abandoned the shoe-making business to look for his son until he and Carol both died in 1991. The neglected shoe factory eventually closed, sending Brantford into economic decline.

Realizing that they need Sarah to finish the game, the three locate her and persuade her to join them, although she has been haunted by both Jumanji and Alan's disappearance. Sarah and Alan soon take their next turns, with the latter's releasing a big-game hunter named Van Pelt, whom he first met in the game's inner world. Judy's roll summons a stampeding herd of various animals, including several pelicans, one of which steals the game. Peter retrieves it, but Carl arrests Alan. Peter inadvertently cheats by dropping the dice instead of rolling them on his turn, causing the game to devolve him into the shape of a monkey. As the stampede wreaks havoc in town, Van Pelt steals the game.

Peter, Sarah and Judy follow Van Pelt to a local department store and battle him to reclaim the game, while Alan is released after revealing his identity to Carl. Returning to the mansion, the quartet release one calamity after another until Alan wins the game, which nullifies everything that happened as a result of the game.

Alan and Sarah return to 1969 in time for Alan to reconcile with Sam, who assures him that he does not have to attend boarding school. Alan also admits his responsibility for damaging the shoe, and Carl is rehired. Remembering the game's events, Alan and Sarah throw Jumanji into a river and share a kiss.

Later, Alan and Sarah, now married, are expecting their first child. Alan's parents are still alive, Alan is successfully running the family business, and Carl is a trusted employee and family confidante. Alan and Sarah meet Judy, Peter, and their parents Jim and Martha for the first time during a Christmas party. Alan offers a job to Jim and convinces him and Martha to cancel their ski trip, averting their deaths in the previous timeline.

Meanwhile, on a beach, Jumanji is seen lying partially buried in the sand. Two French-speaking girls hear the drumbeats from the game as they walk towards it.

== Cast ==
- Robin Williams as Alan Parrish, a 1969 middle schooler who becomes trapped in Jumanji for 26 years.
  - Adam Hann-Byrd portrays a young Alan.
- Jonathan Hyde as:
  - Van Pelt, a big-game hunter in Jumanji who pursues Alan.
  - Sam Parrish, Alan's father.
- Bonnie Hunt as Sarah Whittle, a 1969 teenager who grows into a fortune-teller haunted by Alan's disappearance.
  - Laura Bell Bundy portrays a young Sarah.
- Kirsten Dunst as Judy Shepherd, a 1995 girl who co-discovers Jumanji, along with her brother, Peter, after moving in to the Parrish house.
- Bradley Pierce as Peter Shepherd, a 1995 boy and younger brother of Judy.
- David Alan Grier as Carl Bentley, a 1969 employee for the Parrish family's shoe-making business who later becomes a police officer.
- Bebe Neuwirth as Nora Shepherd, Judy and Peter's aunt and legal guardian.

Cast appearing in the 1995 portion include Malcolm Stewart and Annabel Kershaw as Judy's parents, Jim and Martha Shepherd, and James Handy portrays an exterminator, Gillian Barber as realtor Mrs. Thomas, Darryl Henriques as a gun salesman, and Robyn Driscoll and Peter James Bryant as a team of paramedics. In the 1969 portion, Patricia Clarkson appears as Alan's mother Carol.

== Production ==
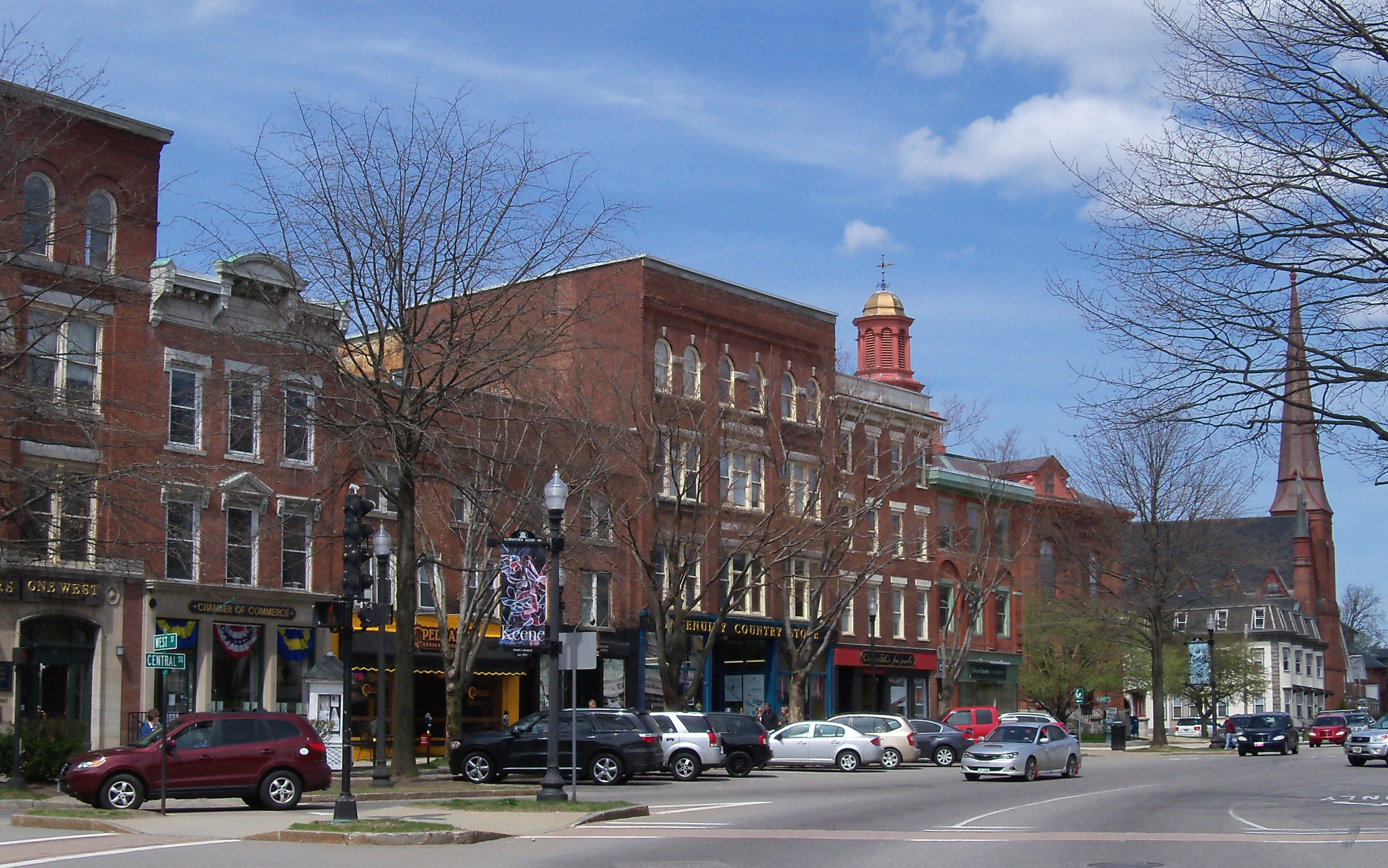
The film was shot in Keene, New Hampshire.

While Peter Guber was visiting Boston, he invited author Chris Van Allsburg, who lived in Providence, to option his book. Van Allsburg wrote one of the screenplay's drafts, which he described as "sort of trying to imbue the story with a quality of mystery and surrealism". Van Allsburg added that the studio nearly abandoned the project if not for his film treatment, which earned a story credit, given that it added story material that was not from the book.

TriStar Pictures agreed to finance the film, on the condition that Robin Williams play the starring role. Williams turned down the role based on the first script he was given, but after director Joe Johnston and screenwriters Jonathan Hensleigh, Greg Taylor and Jim Strain undertook extensive rewrites, Williams accepted. Johnston had reservations over casting Williams because of the actor's reputation for improvisation, fearing that he would not adhere to the script. However, Williams understood that it was "a tightly structured story", and he filmed the scenes as outlined in the script, often filming duplicate scenes in which he was allowed to improvise with Bonnie Hunt.

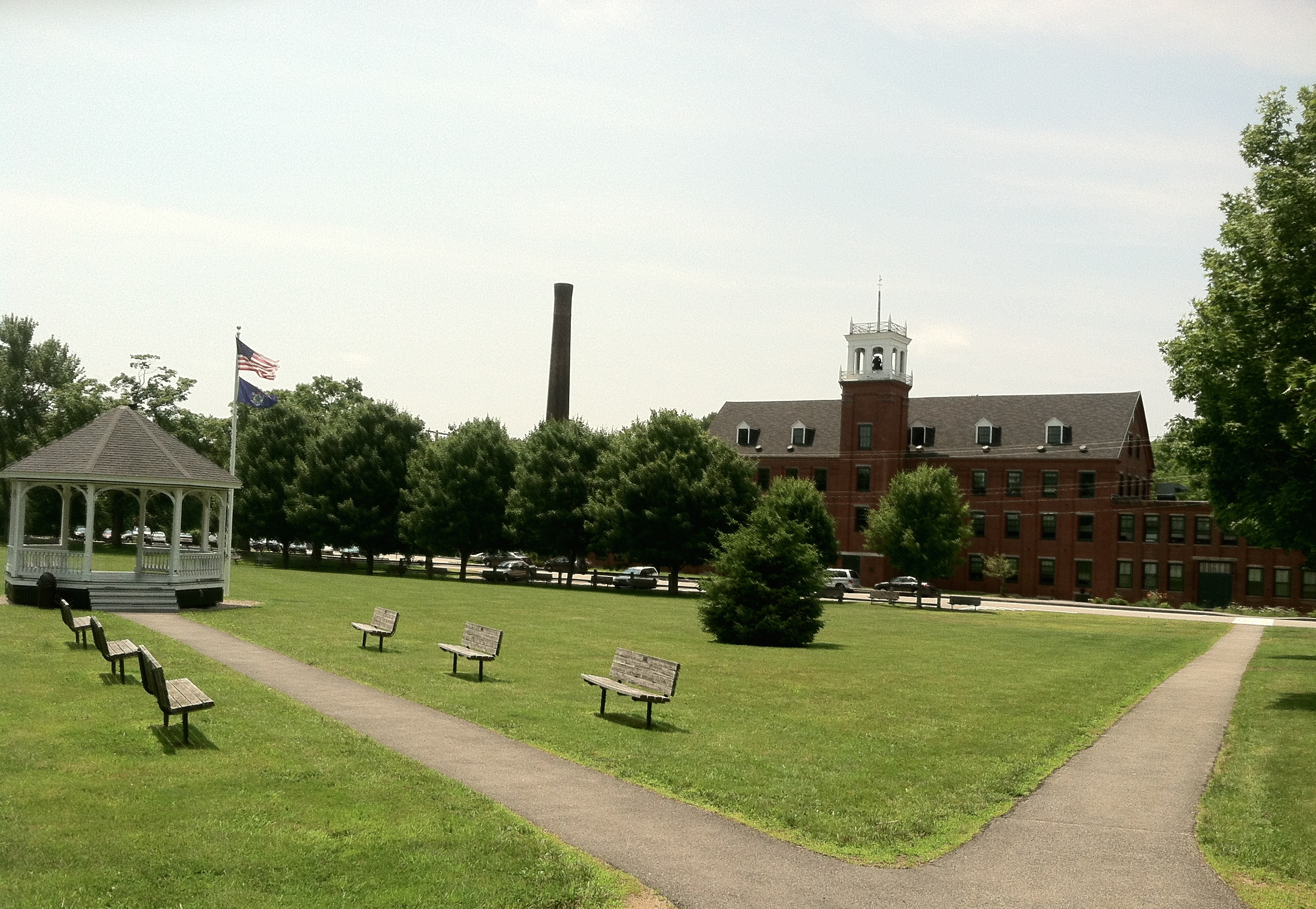
Olde Woolen Mill, a mill complex which represented the Parrish Shoe Factory in the film.

Principal photography began on November 14, 1994, and wrapped in April 1995. Shooting took place in various New England locales, mainly Keene, New Hampshire, which represented the story's fictional town of Brantford, New Hampshire and North Berwick, Maine, where the Olde Woolen Mill represented the Parrish Shoe Factory. A large portion of filming took place in Vancouver, British Columbia, where a mock-up of the Parrish house was built, as well as the entire sequence at Sir Save-A-Lot (shot at the Delta Fair Mall and Liquidation World) in Tsawwassen, British Columbia, among other locations.

Special effects were a combination of traditional techniques like puppetry and animatronics (provided by Amalgamated Dynamics), with state-of-the-art digital effects overseen by Industrial Light & Magic. ILM developed two new software programs specifically for Jumanji; one called iSculpt, which allowed the illustrators to create realistic facial expressions on the computer-generated animals in the film, and another that, for the first time, created realistic digital hair, used on the monkeys and lion. Actor Bradley Pierce underwent three and a half hours of prosthetic makeup application daily for a period of two and a half months to film the scenes in which he slowly transformed into a monkey.

The film was dedicated to visual effects supervisor Stephen L. Price, who died before the film's release.

== Release ==
Jumanji first premiered on December 10, 1995, in Culver City, California, where Sony Pictures Entertainment, TriStar's parent company, was located. It was released in theaters on December 15 of the same year.

=== Home media ===
Jumanji was released on VHS on May 14, 1996, and on DVD on April 29, 1997, by Columbia TriStar Home Video. It proved successful in the home video market, and ended up as the 7th best-selling video in the United States for 1996. In 2000, the film was re-released on DVD in a "Collector's Series Edition". In the United Kingdom, the film was released on DVD as a special edition bundled with the Jumanji board game. The film was released on Blu-ray on June 28, 2011, and was also re-released in a "20th Anniversary Edition" on September 14, 2015, by Sony Pictures Home Entertainment. A restored version was released on December 5, 2017, on Blu-ray and 4K UHD, to coincide with the premiere of the sequel, Jumanji: Welcome to the Jungle.

== Reception ==
=== Box office ===
Jumanji did well at the box office, opening at number 1 and overtaking Toy Story, earning approximately $11 million in its first weekend. The film collected approximately $101 million in the United States and Canada, and an additional $162 million overseas, bringing the worldwide gross to $263 million. Audiences polled by CinemaScore gave the film an average grade of "A−" on a scale of A+ to F.

=== Critical response ===
Jumanji received mixed reviews from critics, who felt the film prioritized visual effects at the expense of storytelling. On the review aggregator website Rotten Tomatoes, 56% of 52 critics' reviews are positive. The website's consensus reads: "A feast for the eyes with a somewhat malnourished plot, Jumanji is an underachieving adventure that still offers a decent amount of fun for the whole family." Metacritic, which uses a weighted average, assigned the film a score of 41 out of 100, based on 19 critics, indicating "mixed or average" reviews.

Peter Bradshaw of The Guardian gave the film four stars out of five, writing, "Williams is exuberant but controlled as elephants trample the town and a waterfall crashes down the stairs in bizarre Kiplingesque fantasy that still holds up." Kim Newman of Empire Magazine gave the film three stars out of five, writing, "It's rampant fun while you're sitting through it - especially if you're under 13 - but there's really not that much to keep you sucked in beyond the credits; a half-term crowd-pleaser you'll have forgotten by summer."

Roger Ebert of the Chicago Sun-Times rated the film one and a half stars out of four, criticizing its reliance on special effects to convey its story, which he felt was lacking. He questioned the decision to rate the movie PG rather than PG-13, for he felt that young children would be traumatized by much of the film's imagery, which he said made the film "about as appropriate for smaller children as, say, Jaws". He specifically cited Peter's monkey transformation as making him "look like a Wolf Man... with a hairy snout and wicked jaws" that were likely to scare children. Regarding the board game's unleashing one hazard after another at its main characters, Ebert concluded, "It's like those video games where you achieve one level after another by killing and not getting killed. The ultimate level for young viewers will be being able to sit all the way through the movie." Leonard Klady of Variety praised the story and its visuals, but he found the film frightening for younger audiences.

Van Allsburg approved of the film (despite changes from the book, and the screenplay not being as "idiosyncratic and peculiar" as his original story), declaring that "the film is faithful in reproducing the chaos level that comes with having a jungle animal in the house. It's a good movie."

== Franchise ==
=== Spin-off ===
Zathura: A Space Adventure, the spiritual successor that was marketed as being from the same continuity of the Jumanji franchise, was released as a feature film in 2005. Unlike the Zathura book, this film makes no references to the previous film outside of the marketing statement. Both films are based on books written by Chris Van Allsburg.

=== Sequels ===
A new film, Jumanji: Welcome to the Jungle, is a sequel to the 1995 film. The film contains a whole new set of characters, with none of the original cast from the first film reprising their roles. The film focuses on teenagers in 2017 who are stuck in Jumanji, which has now become a video game and tasks its avatars into saving the dimension to complete it.

Plans for a sequel were started in the late 1990s by Sony Pictures Entertainment, and the original director, Ken Ralston, a visual effects supervisor of the original film, was hired to direct, with a Christmas 2000 release date. However, Ralston stepped down and the sequel was canceled. The development of the sequel again emerged in the 2010s, when president of Columbia Pictures, Doug Belgrad, teased a possibility of the project in July 2012; the project was confirmed three years later in August, with a new director, Jake Kasdan, and starring Dwayne Johnson. The film was released on December 20, 2017, and Robin Williams' character is mentioned in the film as a tribute.

Jumanji: The Next Level, a sequel to Welcome to the Jungle, was released on December 13, 2019. Bebe Neuwirth reprises her role as Nora Shepherd in a cameo at the end of the film.

Jumanji: Open World, a sequel to The Next Level, will be released on December 25, 2026.

=== Television series ===
An animated television series was produced between 1996 and 1999. Although it borrows heavily from the film—incorporating various characters, locations and props, and modeling Alan's house and the board game the way they appeared in the film—the series retcons rather than using the film's storyline. In the series, the players are given a "game clue" in each turn and sucked into the jungle until they solve it. Alan is stuck in Jumanji because he has not seen his clue. Judy and Peter try to help him leave the game, providing their motivation during the series, while Sarah is absent from the series, and Alan has a relationship with Aunt Nora instead of Sarah, which, unlike the film, gives a clear explanation about his position as Judy and Peter's uncle.

== Other media ==
=== Games ===
Jumanji: The Game is a board game originally released in the United States in 1995 by Milton Bradley. An updated version (with new colorized artwork) was released in 2017 by Cardinal Games. Some of the riddle-messages on the "danger" cards were updated and changed. That year, designer Rachel Lowe won a British Game of the Year Award (awarded by the Toy Retailers Association) for the game.

Jumanji: A Jungle Adventure Game Pack is a North American-exclusive game for Microsoft Windows that was released on October 9, 1996. It was developed by Studio Interactive and published by Philips Interactive Media. It contains five different action-arcade minigames, based on pivotal scenes from the film; notably, the game does not feature the actual Jumanji board game seen in the movie. Bonus clips of cutscenes from the film can also be viewed. There are five different minigames from which the player can choose, with different rules and objectives. Animals from the film provide instructions to the player for each minigame, except for the Treasure Maze minigame, in which the Jumanji "Spirit" provides instructions instead. All of the minigames contain rounds (or levels); when players attain a goal, that level is cleared and the player advances to a more difficult version of the minigame. The player must try to score as many points as possible and set the best high score.

A party video game based on the film was released in Europe for PlayStation 2 in 2006.

In 2007, Fuji Shoji released a pachinko game using clips from the film (with 3D-rendered CGI anime characters) as part of the screen interaction.

The Noble Collection created a special "Collector's Replica" based on the game's original board game form that also incorporates elements of the video game incarnation from the later films.

=== Theme parks ===
A Jumanji-themed dark ride opened at Gardaland, Italy, for the 2022 season, featuring a large animatronic figure.

On May 15, 2023, Chessington World of Adventures in the UK unveiled a new themed area called "World of Jumanji", featuring a jungle atmosphere, lush landscaping, and several rides, including "Ostrich Stampede" and "Mamba Strike". The area's main attraction is a B&M shuttle wing coaster called "Mandrill Mayhem", on which the track weaves in and around a giant rock-sculpture "mountain" that is shaped like a tiger's head.

== Legacy ==
In 2005, Jumanji was listed 48th in Channel 4's documentary 100 Greatest Family Films, just behind Disney's Dumbo, Sam Raimi's Spider-Man and Jason & the Argonauts.

In 2011, Robin Williams recorded an audiobook for Van Allsburg's book's 30th edition to coincide with its release.
