= Lawrence Rifles =

The Lawrence Rifles were a volunteer Union militia company from Medford, Massachusetts that was formed during the American Civil War. It was created by Governor John A. Andrew on January 27, 1865 and was first made part of the 5th Massachusetts Militia Regiment as Company E, then became Company F. Attorney Benjamin Franklin Hayes was the original commander. It 1874 Lawrence Rifles merged with the Lawrence Light Guard, and the charter was transferred to a Waltham company.
