= Robert D. Kennedy =

American businessman (1932–2021)

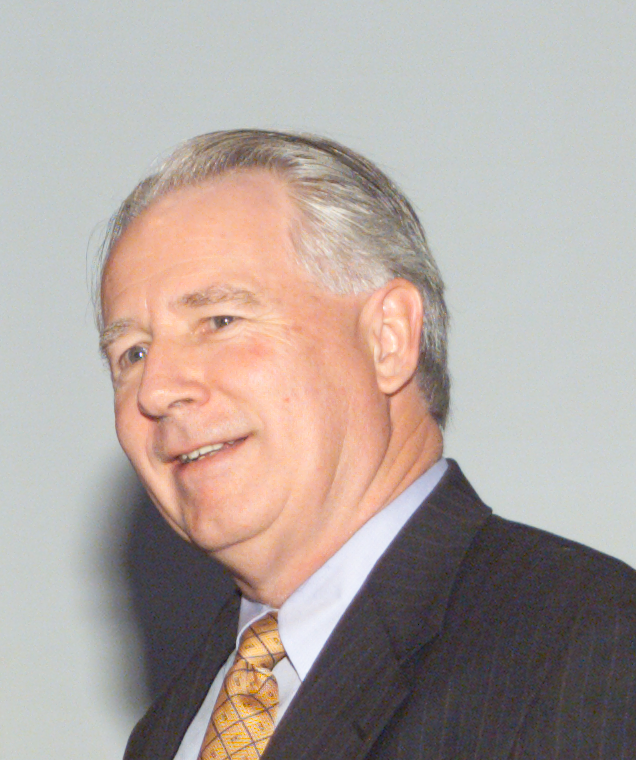
- Kennedy in March 2004

CEO of Union Carbide
- In office 1986–1995
- Preceded by: Alec Flamm
- Succeeded by: William H. Joyce

Personal details
- Born: November 8, 1932; Pittsburgh, Pennsylvania, U.S.
- Died: April 3, 2021 (aged 88); New Canaan, Connecticut, U.S.
- Spouse: Sally Duff (after 1956)
- Education: New Hampton School
- Alma mater: Cornell University

Robert D. Kennedy (November 8, 1932 – April 3, 2021) was an American businessman who served as president, CEO, and chairman of Union Carbide.

== Early life and education ==
Kennedy was born on November 8, 1932, in Pittsburgh, Pennsylvania, the youngest of four sons born to Lois (née Smith) Kennedy and T. Reed Kennedy.

He attended New Hampton School in New Hampton, New Hampshire, graduating with the class of 1950. He then attended Cornell University, where he received a B.S. in Mechanical Engineering in 1955 and was elected into the Sphinx Head Society.

== Career ==
After graduating from Cornell, Kennedy joined Union Carbide as a trainee at the division's Edgewater Research Laboratory in Cleveland, Ohio. In 1977 Kennedy became president of the Linde division of the company and built a $29 million industrial gases complex in Niagara Falls, New York. He was elected a senior vice president in 1981, and an executive vice president in 1982.

In July 1985, Kennedy and Heinn F. Tomfohrde III, both executive vice presidents, were appointed as co-presidents of Union Carbide, sharing the responsibilities of Alec Flamm, the former president and chief operating officer who became vice chairman. Kennedy became the head of Carbide's plastics and chemicals businesses, while Tomfohrde, became head of its industrial products and services businesses.

In March 1986, he became chief executive officer and, in December 1986, chairman, succeeding Warren M. Anderson in both roles. Under Kennedy's tenure, "the company trimmed its operations to focus on petrochemicals, its core operations." In 1990, he was succeeded as president by H. William Lichtenberger, president of Carbide's chemicals and plastics unit. Kennedy continued as chairman and chief executive.

He retired as chief executive in 1995 and was succeeded by William H. Joyce, chief operating officer and president since 1993. Kennedy continued as chairman until he fully retired from the company on December 31, 1995. He also served as a director of Kmart Corporation, Lion Ore Mining International Ltd., Sunoco, Inc., and Union Camp Corporation.

== Personal life ==
On January 28, 1956, Kennedy married Sally Duff. Together, they were the parents of Robert B. Kennedy, Thomas Kennedy, Kathleen Kennedy and Melissa (née Kennedy) Jurick.

Kennedy died on April 3, 2021, at his home in New Canaan, Connecticut.
