= Lebanon, Maine =

- Town
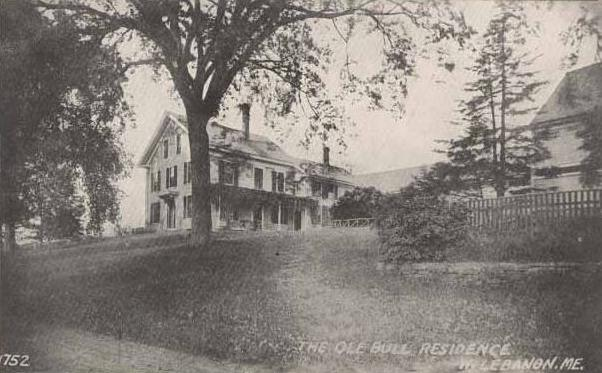
- Ironwell, the Ole Bull residence c. 1915

- Seal

- Location within Maine
- Coordinates: 43°24′02″N 70°54′40″W
- Country: United States
- State: Maine
- County: York
- Incorporated: 1767

Government
  - Type: Town Meeting

Area
  - Total: 55.83 sq mi (144.60 km^{2})
  - Land: 55.00 sq mi (142.45 km^{2})
  - Water: 0.83 sq mi (2.15 km^{2})
- Elevation: 453 ft (138 m)

Population (2020)
  - Total: 6,469
  - Density: 118/sq mi (45.4/km^{2})
- Time zone: UTC-5 (Eastern (EST))
  - Summer (DST): UTC-4 (EDT)
- ZIP code: 04027
- Area code: 207
- FIPS code: 23-38425
- GNIS feature ID: 582550
- Website: www.lebanon-me.org

Lebanon is a town in York County, Maine, United States. The population was 6,469 at the 2020 census. Lebanon includes the villages of Center Lebanon, West Lebanon, North Lebanon, South Lebanon, and East Lebanon. It is the westernmost town in Maine. Lebanon is part of the Portland–South Portland–Biddeford, Maine metropolitan statistical area.

== History ==
It was called Towwoh by the Newichawannock Abenaki tribe, whose main village was further down the Salmon Falls River. On April 20, 1733, the Massachusetts General Court granted Towwoh Plantation to 60 colonists, who first settled it in 1743. The township was incorporated on June 17, 1767, renamed Lebanon after the biblical land of Lebanon. It was Maine's 23rd town. Lebanon annexed unincorporated land in 1785, and some from Sanford in 1787. It swapped land with Shapleigh, giving some in 1793, then annexing some in 1825.

Farmers found the surface of the town relatively level in the southeast, with extensive pine plains in the northwest. The chief crop would be hay. At the Salmon Falls River and the Little River were water power sites for mills. Lebanon had four sawmills, three gristmills, a shingle mill, a wool carding mill and a tannery. In 1850, Oren B. Cheney founded West Lebanon Academy. Beginning in the early 1870s, the Portland and Rochester Railroad ran the length of the town's southeast side, with the Portsmouth, Great Falls and Conway Railroad crossing for a short distance on the western side.

== Geography ==
According to the United States Census Bureau, the town has a total area of 55.83 square miles (144.60 km^{2}), of which 55.00 square miles (142.45 km^{2}) is land and 0.83 square miles (2.15 km^{2}) is water. Lebanon is drained by the Little River and Salmon Falls River. The town's highest point is Prospect Hill, at an elevation of 880 feet (268 m) above sea level. The lowest elevation borders the Salmon Falls River, on the town's southernmost boundary, which is approximately 170 feet (52 m) above sea level.

The town is crossed by U.S. Route 202 and State Route 11. It borders the towns of Acton to the north, Sanford to the east, Berwick and North Berwick to the southeast, and the New Hampshire towns of Milton and Rochester to the west.

== Demographics ==
Historical population
Census	Pop.	Note	%±
1790	1,296		—
1800	1,657		27.9%
1810	1,938		17.0%
1820	2,223		14.7%
1830	2,391		7.6%
1840	2,273		−4.9%
1850	2,208		−2.9%
1860	2,040		−7.6%
1870	1,953		−4.3%
1880	1,601		−18.0%
1890	1,263		−21.1%
1900	1,335		5.7%
1910	1,316		−1.4%
1920	1,192		−9.4%
1930	1,148		−3.7%
1940	1,452		26.5%
1950	1,499		3.2%
1960	1,534		2.3%
1970	1,983		29.3%
1980	3,234		63.1%
1990	4,263		31.8%
2000	5,083		19.2%
2010	6,031		18.7%
2020	6,469		7.3%

=== 2000 census ===
As of the census of 2000, there were 5,083 people, 1,823 households, and 1,405 families living in the town. The population density was 92.9 inhabitants per square mile (35.9/km^{2}). There were 2,090 housing units at an average density of 38.2 per square mile (14.7/km^{2}). The racial makeup of the town was 98.49% White, 0.31% African American, 0.28% Native American, 0.26% Asian, 0.08% from other races, and 0.59% from two or more races. 0.63% of the population were Hispanic or Latino of any race.

There were 1,823 households, out of which 38.4% had children under the age of 18 living with them, 61.9% were married couples living together, 9.9% had a female householder with no husband present, and 22.9% were non-families. 17.2% of all households were made up of individuals, and 6.6% had someone living alone who was 65 years of age or older. The average household size was 2.79 and the average family size was 3.10.

In the town, the population was spread out, with 28.6% under the age of 18, 7.2% from 18 to 24, 30.6% from 25 to 44, 23.7% from 45 to 64, and 9.9% who were 65 years of age or older. The median age was 37 years. For every 100 females, there were 101.0 males. For every 100 females age 18 and over, there were 98.8 males.

The median income for a household in the town was $40,021, and the median income for a family was $41,713. Males had a median income of $33,551 versus $22,292 for females. The per capita income for the town was $15,503. 10.4% of the population and 8.8% of families were below the poverty line. Out of the total population, 12.9% of those under the age of 18 and 7.1% of those 65 and older were living below the poverty line.

=== 2010 census ===
As of the census of 2010, there were 6,031 people, 2,204 households, and 1,679 families living in the town. The population density was 109.7 inhabitants per square mile (42.4/km^{2}). There were 2,540 housing units at an average density of 46.2 per square mile (17.8/km^{2}). The racial makeup of the town was 97.1% White, 0.4% African American, 0.3% Native American, 0.8% Asian, 0.1% from other races, and 1.3% from two or more races. Hispanic or Latino of any race were 0.9% of the population.

There were 2,204 households, of which 37.7% had children under the age of 18 living with them, 59.7% were married couples living together, 10.6% had a female householder with no husband present, 5.9% had a male householder with no wife present, and 23.8% were non-families. 16.7% of all households were made up of individuals, and 5.5% had someone living alone who was 65 years of age or older. The average household size was 2.74 and the average family size was 3.05.

The median age in the town was 39.3 years. 25.2% of residents were under the age of 18; 7.5% were between the ages of 18 and 24; 25.8% were from 25 to 44; 31% were from 45 to 64; and 10.4% were 65 years of age or older. The gender makeup of the town was 50.5% male and 49.5% female.

=== 2020 census ===
As of the census of 2020, there were 6,469 people, x households, and x families living in the town. The population density was 109.7 inhabitants per square mile (42.4/km^{2}). There were 2654 housing units at an average density of 46.2 per square mile (17.8/km^{2}). The racial makeup of the town was 99.5% White, 0.0% African American, 0.0% Native American, 0.1% Asian, 0.0% from other races, and 0.04% from two or more races. Hispanic or Latino of any race were 0.004% of the population. There were 2654 households.

The median age in the town was 38.3 years. 25.7% of residents were under the age of 18; 7.1% were between the ages of 18 and 24; 26.4% were from 25 to 44; 28.7% were from 45 to 64; and 12.6% were 65 years of age or older. The gender makeup of the town was 47.6% male and 53.2% female.

== Education ==
Lebanon is part of MSAD60/RSU 60. Audra Beauvais is the Superintendent of Schools.

Lebanon had two schools, Lebanon Elementary School (grades 4–5) and Hanson School (grades K–3). A 2025 change closed Lebanon Elementary School and added pre-k to the Hanson school

Hanson School - Lebanon Grades Pre-k - 3

Eric L. Knowlton School - District Grade 4

Noble Intermediate - District Grades 5-6

Noble Middle/High School - District Grades 7-12

Noble FLEX - Hybrid Learning - Mix of onsite and virtual - for grades 5-8

Mary Hurd Academy - District alternative education

== Notable people ==
- Ole Bull, violinist and composer (summer resident)
- Oren B. Cheney, clergyman, abolitionist, founded Bates College
- Claudius B. Grant, Chief Justice of the Michigan Supreme Court
- Elihu B. Hayes, manufacturer, newspaper owner and politician
- Charles Coffin Jewett, superintendent of the Boston Public Library
- Sumner Increase Kimball, organized the United States Life-Saving Service
- Charles E. Littlefield, US congressman
