= Olde Woolen Mill =

- North Berwick Woolen Mill
- U.S. National Register of Historic Places
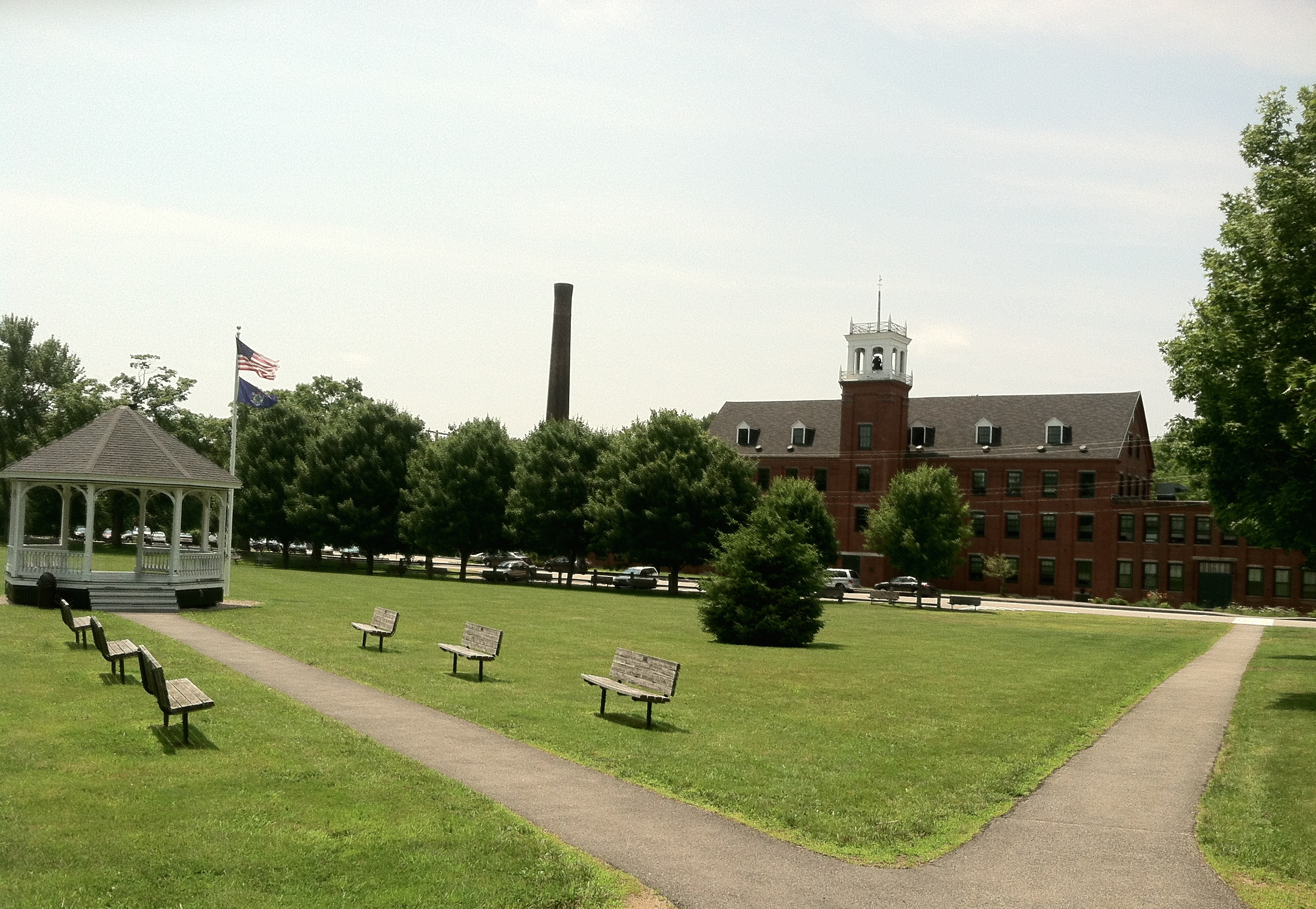

- Location within Maine Location within the United States
- Location: Canal St., North Berwick, Maine
- Coordinates: 43°18′16″N 70°44′15″W
- Area: 1.5 acres (0.61 ha)
- Built: 1862
- Architectural style: Mid 19th Century Revival, Late Victorian
- NRHP reference No.: 83000482
- Added to NRHP: July 21, 1983

The Olde Woolen Mill (also known as the North Berwick Woolen Mill) is a historic mill complex at Canal Street, on the Great Works River in the center of North Berwick, Maine. Built in 1862, it is the only major mill complex in the Berwick region of York County. It was listed on the National Register of Historic Places in 1983.

== Description and history ==
The mill is located between Canal Street and the Great Works River, just south of Wells Street (Maine State Route 9) in the village center of North Berwick. The associated mill pond is located just north of Wells Street. The mill complex is a somewhat typical 19th century New England mill complex, with a large rectangular main building, with a series of attached wings. The complex exhibits an eclectic mixture of architectural detailing, including elements of Greek Revival, Italianate, and Colonial Revival styling.

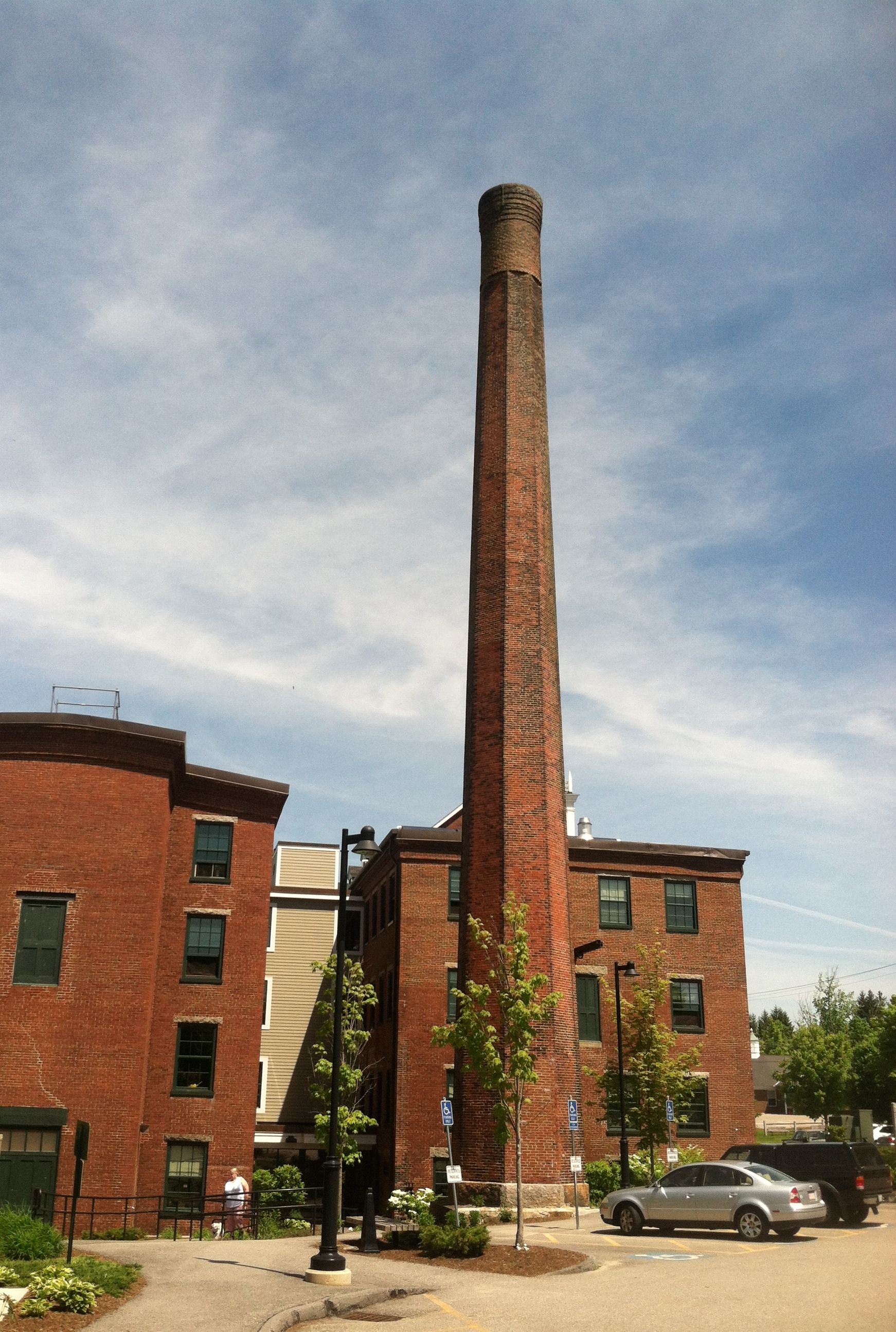
One of the oldest steam engines in the U.S. is connected to this smokestack.

An earlier wooden mill built on the site in 1832 was destroyed by fire, and the existing brick structure built in 1862. Primarily owned by Quakers, the mill, one of the first to automate the manufacture of blankets, produced uniforms and blankets for Union soldiers during the American Civil War. At its foundation level has been preserved one of the earliest steam engines in the United States, and the only one of its kind to survive.

The mill closed in 1955 and remained mostly unused for nearly 40 years, when it served as the site of the Parrish Shoe Factory in the 1995 fantasy movie Jumanji. In 2009 the structure was renovated into a senior housing site by the Caleb Group, a nonprofit housing organization of New England. It was the first property to be awarded a tax credit under the Maine State Historic Rehabilitation Tax Credit Act of 2008.

== See also ==
- National Register of Historic Places listings in York County, Maine
