= Greg Taylor (author) =

American children's author

- Born: 1951 (age 74–75); Pittsburgh, Pennsylvania, U.S.
- Occupations: Children's book writer, screenwriter

Greg Taylor (born 1951) is an American writer of books for children and young adults. He is also a screenwriter of films including Jumanji and Prancer.

== Life ==
Taylor was born and raised in Pittsburgh, Pennsylvania, and attended Penn State University.

== Books ==
=== Killer Pizza ===
Published in 2009 by Feiwel & Friends, Greg Taylor's debut novel Killer Pizza is styled after B horror movies. Aspiring to be a famous chef, Toby McGill gets a job at a monster-themed pizza restaurant named Killer Pizza, only to discover that his new place of employment is actually a Monster Hunting Organization; he and other teens, Strobe and Annabel, fight monsters called the guttata (werewolf-like creatures) while disguised in their pizza delivery uniforms. Film studio MGM was reported in 2011 to have been working on a movie adaptation with a script by Adam Green.

=== Killer Pizza: The Slice ===
Killer Pizza: The Slice, a sequel to Killer Pizza, was published in 2011 by Feiwel & Friends. Toby and his fellow monster-hunters visit the Killer Pizza headquarters in New York and are sent on a mission involving a teenage shapeshifter.

=== The Girl Who Became a Beatle ===
Published in 2011 by Feiwel & Friends, this young adult-novel is about a teenage musician who wishes her band, The Caverns, could be as famous as The Beatles. The next day, she finds that The Caverns have replaced The Beatles in history. Christian Science Monitor found it "slight but engaging".
