= Benjamin Franklin Hayes =

American politician (1836–1901)

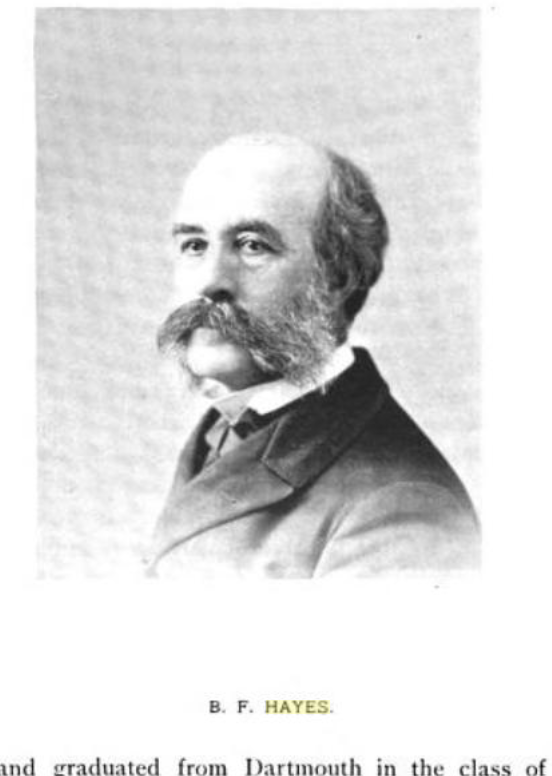
Attorney and legislator Benjamin Franklin Hayes of Medford Massachusetts and Berwick Maine

Benjamin Franklin Hayes (July 3, 1836 – January 31, 1901) was an American judge, state representative, and state senator from Medford, Massachusetts.

== Early life ==
Hayes was born in Berwick, Maine on July 3, 1836, to Frederick and Sarah (Hurd) Hayes, active Free Will Baptists. He attended the New Hampton School and then studied the law for a year with Wade & Eastman in Great Falls, New Hampshire in 1859-60 before entering the Harvard Law School.

== Career ==
He was admitted to the Suffolk County, Massachusetts bar in 1861 while still in law school and then worked for Baker & Sullivan in Boston and lived in Medford.

From 1862 to 1873 Hayes served as a Middlesex County trial justice. From 1864 to 1870 he served as assistant U.S. revenue assessor, and from 1868 to 1871 served on the Medford school board. He was elected a state representative from 1872 to 1874; and then state senator from 1878 to 1879. In 1892 he worked on the commission to create and obtain a city charter for Medford, and served as the first city solicitor until his death. Starting in 1869 he served as a trustee and board member of Medford Savings bank and later president starting in 1899. He also served in the Lawrence Rifles militia. His brothers Frederick Hayes and Dr. John Alfred Hayes, a surgeon, were notable Civil War veterans.

Benjamin Franklin Hayes died at his home in Medford on January 31, 1901.

== See also ==
- 1872 Massachusetts legislature
- 1873 Massachusetts legislature
- 1874 Massachusetts legislature
- 1878 Massachusetts legislature
