= Sarah Wilson (impostor) =

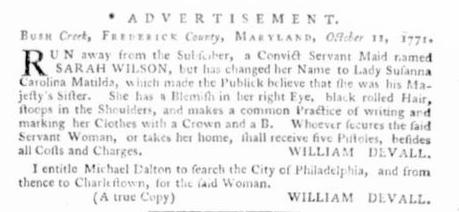
A 1773 advertisement in the Virginia Gazette seeking the return of Wilson

Sarah Wilson (1745? – 1780) was an English impostor who traveled to America as a convict servant and pretended to be the sister of Queen Charlotte.

== Early life ==
Sarah Wilson was probably born in London. She was a menial servant in the kitchen of George-Lewis Scott. In around 1762 or 1763, while still in her teens, she began her career of wandering around England “imposing on the compassion and credulity of different persons in town and country”. A newspaper report from Devizes in Wiltshire in 1767 said, “It seems this woman has, for some time past, been travelling through almost all parts of the Kingdom, assuming various titles and characters, at different times and places: she has presented herself to be of high birth and distinction, as well foreign and English, and accordingly stiling herself a Princess of Mecklenburgh, Countess of Normandy, Lady Countess Wilbrahammon, &c. &c. and under some or other of such names making promises of providing, by means of her weight and interest, for the families of … the lower class of people; unto those of higher rank in life she has represented herself to be in the greatest distress, abandoned and deserted by her parents and friends of considerable family, either upon account of an unfortunate love affair, or of religion, pretending to be a Protestant against the will of her relations, who were Roman Catholicks, and always varying the account of herself as she chanced to pick up intelligence of characters and connections of those she intended to deceive and impose upon … She is a short woman, slender made, of a pale complexion, something deformed, has a speck or knell over one eye.”

In November 1767 Sir John Fielding sent Wilson to Tothill Fields Bridewell to await trial for obtaining a set of expensive clothes by false pretenses. At the Westminster Quarter Sessions in January 1768 Wilson was sentenced to penal transportation to the American colonies.

== In America ==
According to an advertisement dated October 11, 1771, reprinted in Rivington’s New York Gazetteer for May 13, 1773, Wilson was sold to William Devall, or Duvall, of Bush-Creek, Frederick County, Maryland as a convict servant maid, and had escaped from him.

Wilson travelled through Virginia and the Carolinas as Princess Sophia Carolina Augusta, Queen Charlotte’s sister, where, “… she travelled from one gentleman’s house to another … and made astonishing impressions in many places, affecting the mode of royalty so inimitably, that many had the honour to kiss her hand; to some she promised governments, to others regiments, with promotions of all kinds, in the Treasury, Army and in the Royal Navy … [and]… levied heavy contributions upon some persons of the highest rank in the Southern colonies.”

From July to November 1772 Wilson appears to have been using Charleston, South Carolina as a base for her exploits. She returned to Charleston in February 1773, where she took up lodgings in King Street. It appears that the newspaper reports of her travels came to the attention of William Devall, who sent an agent to Charleston to capture her. If so, it appears that she might have bought her freedom with her ill-gotten gains for she turned up in New York in August 1773 as there was no indication in the report of her arrival in New York, nor in any of the subsequent news stories about her, that she was a wanted fugitive.

Wilson stayed in Boston from 7 December 1773 to 11 January 1774 as Princess Carolina Matilda, Princess of Cronenburgh, Marchioness de Waldegrave. She might have been one of those who watched the Sons of Liberty throwing the chests of tea from the three ships in Boston Harbour on the night of 16 December 1773.

Wilson later gave herself another title, Princess of Browtonsburgh, and, while still maintaining her royal pretentions, decided to play the religious card, becoming the house-guest of Congregationalists in puritan New England, some of whom were also actively involved in the revolutionary cause at the onset of the American War of Independence.

Wilson died at Berwick, Maine on 23 February 1780.

== Untrue tales ==
There are a number of untrue stories about Sarah Wilson. The first appeared in Rivington’s New York Gazetteer on 13 May 1773 that Wilson was a maidservant to Caroline Vernon, lady-in-waiting for Queen Charlotte, and began to steal the jewellery and clothing of the queen. She was apprehended and first condemned to death but eventually the sentence was commuted to penal transportation to the American colonies. This story was reprinted in several American and English newspapers, as well as the Gentleman’s and London Magazines. While much of the detail in the report in Rivington’s New York Gazetteer is either true, or likely to be true, the record is clear that Wilson was transported for obtaining clothes by false pretenses from a Mrs Davenport. There is no record of Queen Charlotte’s jewels or clothes being stolen.

Later inventions were that she was dragged back to Bush Creek where she remained for two years before escaping again. She later married a British army officer named William Talbot, moved to New York, had a large family and lived happily ever after.

== Bibliography ==
- Burton, Sarah (2000). Imposters: Six Kinds of Liar. Penguin Books. ISBN 0-670-88574-6.
- Clarke, R. J. (2019). Impostress: The Dishonest Adventures of Sarah Wilson. The History Press. ISBN 978-0-7509-8992-3.
- Hewitt, John (1778). Memoirs of the celebrated Lady Viscountess Wilbrihammon, alias Mollineux, alias Irving, Countess of Normandy, and Baroness Wilmington, the greatest Impostress of the present Age.
