= John Alfred Hayes =

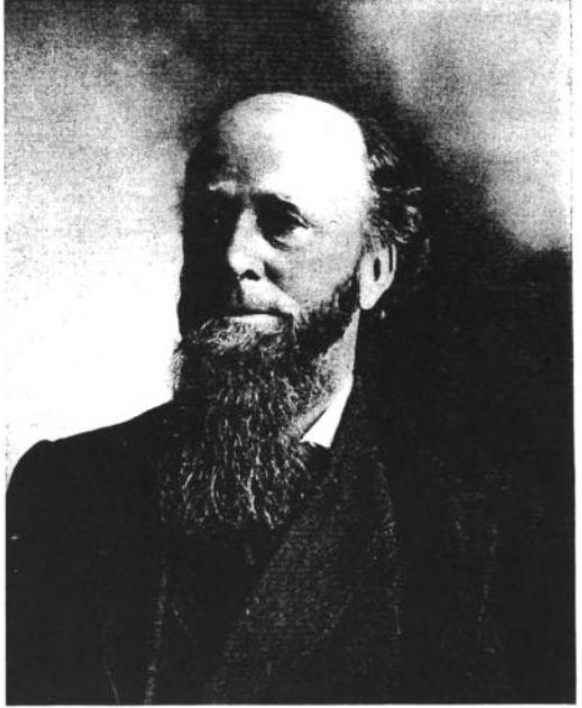
- Born: 1839; Berwick, Maine, U.S.
- Died: 1913 (aged 73–74)
- Alma mater: Geisel School of Medicine
- Relatives: Frederick Hayes (brother); Benjamin Franklin Hayes (brother)
- Military career
- Allegiance: United States
- Branch: Union Army
- Rank: Lieutenant Colonel
- Commands: 11th New Hampshire Infantry Regiment
- Conflicts: American Civil War: Battle of Fredericksburg

John Alfred Hayes (1839–1913) was a Union Army surgeon and officer during the American Civil War and later a physician in New Hampshire.

John Alfred Hayes was born in Berwick, Maine, to a Sarah (Hurd) Hayes and Frederick Hayes, a large farmer and lumber producer who was active in the Freewill Baptist Church. Hayes attended the local schools and then West Lebanon Academy, and the New Hampton School. In 1858 he began studying medicine 1858 with Dr. J. S. Ross, in Somersworth, New Hampshire, and then at Dartmouth Medical School in Hanover, New Hampshire, and Jefferson Medical School in Philadelphia before graduating from Dartmouth in 1861. He worked at the New Hampshire State Hospital (New Hampshire Insane Asylum) at Concord until 1862, when he became assistant surgeon and a major in the 11th New Hampshire Infantry Regiment, where he served in many notable battles, including the Battle of Fredericksburg, and he led large field hospitals containing up to 17,000 disabled soldiers at the time of Lee's surrender at Appomattox. Hayes was made a brevet lieutenant-colonel on March 13, 1865.

After the war ended in 1865, Hayes practiced medicine in Biddeford, Maine, until 1868, when he moved to Somersworth, New Hampshire. In 1869 he married Mary Abby Rollins in Somersworth, and they had four children. From 1867 to 1890, he was appointed U.S. examining surgeon for pensions, and also served as Somersworth's town physician for over a decade. Hayes was a member of the Grand Army of the Republic, the Somersworth Medical Society, and the New Hampshire Medical Society. He was a Congregationalist, and a member of the Republican Party. He died in 1913. He was the brother of soldier Frederick Hayes and attorney and legislator Benjamin Franklin Hayes.
