= Noble High School (Maine) =

Location
- 100 Noble Way, North Berwick ME; North Berwick, Maine 03906; United States; 43°18′23″N 70°46′51″W

Information
- School type: Public, high school
- Opened: 2001
- School district: MSAD/RSU #60
- CEEB code: 200095
- Principal: A.J. Dufort
- Teaching staff: 98.10 (FTE)
- Grades: 7–12
- Enrollment: 1,170 (2023-2024)
- Colors: Maroon, Gray, and White
- Mascot: The Knight
- Nickname: Noble
- Team name: The Knights
- Rivals: Marshwood Hawks
- Accreditation: New England Association of School and Colleges
- Yearbook: The Grail
- Communities served: Berwick, North Berwick, and Lebanon, Maine.
- Feeder schools: Noble Middle School
- Website: www.nhs.rsu60.org

Noble High School is a public high school in North Berwick, Maine, United States, serving students in grades 7-12 from the towns of Berwick, North Berwick, and Lebanon. NOBLE is an acronym for the three towns that NHS serves (NOrth Berwick, Berwick, and LEbanon). Noble High School was a member of the Coalition of Essential Schools.

== History ==
From 1969-2001, Noble High School was located at what is presently Noble Middle School. For the 32 years that NHS was located at this site, the school served the three towns. This site was suitable for a period, but as populations increased within the towns, NHS became very overcrowded. The school was designed for about 550 students, but by 1995 there were over 900 students in the school. As well as overcrowding issues, the facility was very outdated and did not accommodate the needs of the school. Due to the surrounding area, there was also a need for a community facility to serve the rural towns in the district. Pam Fisher, a former NHS principal, was very involved in the process of creating the new school. A committee of community members was created to plan for the new school. The design of the school was highly influenced by the Principles of MSAD 60, and the Coalition of Essential Schools. The school opened in 2001.

== Building ==
Noble High School was designed not only as a school but a community hub, for the three rural towns it serves. The 1000 seat Hussey Theatre has been used for theatrical productions, town meetings, and other events that require the use of the theatre. The school formerly held a 50-seat restaurant, named the Round Table. This functioned as a part of the regional vocational program, where students learned to cook and operate a restaurant open to the community. Noble also had an early childhood education center that served eight surrounding towns' vocational programs. The regional vocational program has since moved to the Sanford Regional Technical Center in neighboring Sanford. Noble High School is also home to Noble Adult & Community Education. Other facilities such as the library/media center, fitness facility, 2 gymnasiums, and a lecture hall are all available to be used by the community.

Noble High School has won many awards for the architecture of the building. NHS has received 13 awards for the design and functionality of the building. In 2002, the building was awarded the William W. Caudill Citation Award.

== Athletics ==
Noble High School participates in Class A and Class A South for all respective sports. Noble irregularly hosts the York County championships for track and field and has hosted the Noble Invitational, an annual multi-state wrestling tournament, for over 40 years.

=== State sports championships ===
Noble has won numerous state of Maine high school sports championships.

- Baseball: 1971
- E-Sports:
  - League of Legends (2021, 2022)
  - Rocket League (2023)
- Football: 1968, (Note: Tied with Berwick Academy, Saint Ignatius High School, and Sanford High School.) 1970, (Note: Tied with Berwick Academy.) 1997
- Gymnastics: 1989-1993, 1995, 1999, 2000
- Girls' Outdoor Track: 1977
- Wrestling: 1985, 1986, 1999-2006, 2009-2011, 2020, 2023
- Duals Wrestling: 2020, (Note: Noble won Maine's first duals championship in 2020 in addition to the traditional tournament-style state championship) 2024

==== Runner Up ====
- E-Sports: 2022 (Note: Placed 2nd in Rocket League behind Caribou High School.)
- Cheerleading: 2024
- Softball: 2003
- Wrestling: 1981, 1984, 1993, 1995, 1998, 2007, 2008, 2017, 2018, 2024
- Duals Wrestling: 2023

=== Southwestern Maine Activities Association (SMAA) Championships ===
Noble High School is a member of the Southwestern Maine Activities Association for many of its sports.

- Cheerleading: 2018, 2023
- Football: 1997
- Softball: 2001, 2002
- Wrestling: 1995, 1998-2001, 2002, (Note: Tied with Westbrook High School.) 2003-2005, 2009, 2011, 2018-2020, 2024

=== Maine Principals' Association (MPA) Sportsmanship Awards ===
This award recognizes high schools sports teams that exemplify good sportsmanship.

- Baseball: 2014, 2017
- Boys' Basketball: 2019-2022 (Note: No awards distributed during the 2021 season.)
- Girls' Basketball: 1992, 2009, 2015, 2016-2018, 2020-2023 (Note: No awards distributed during the 2021 season.)
- Cheerleading: 2016-2018
- Boys' Cross Country: 2018
- Ice Hockey: 2019
- Girls' Lacrosse: 2015, 2018
- Boys' Soccer: 2015
- Girls' Soccer: 2014
- Softball: 2012, 2014, 2016
- Girls' Indoor Track: 2017-2019
- Boys' Outdoor Trak: 2017, 2019
- Girls' Outdoor Track: 2016, 2017 (Note: Shared with Marshwood High School.)
- Wrestling: 2000

== Demographics ==
- American Indian/Alaska Native: < 0.1%
- Asian: 1%
- Native Hawaiian/Pacific Islander: < 0.1%
- Hispanic: 2.8%
- Black, non-Hispanic: 0.5%
- White, non-Hispanic: 90.95%
- Two or More Races: 4.6%
