= Bauneg Beg Mountain =

Mountain in Maine, United States

- Location within Maine

Highest point
- Elevation: 860 ft (260 m)
- Prominence: 420 ft (130 m)
- Coordinates: 43°23′03″N 70°47′06″W

Geography
- Location: York County, Maine, U.S.

Climbing
- Easiest route: Hiking, class 1

Bauneg Beg Mountain is a mountain summit located in the town of North Berwick, in York County in the state of Maine. Bauneg Beg Mountain climbs to 860 ft (260 m) above sea level. Bauneg Beg Mountain is taller than Mount Agamenticus, and has been used by mariners to navigate the Maine Coast. This area is characterized by rolling forested hills, broad stream valleys, and numerous swamps.

Bauneg Beg Mountain is the only mountain in southern Maine that does not have a radio tower on it. It is home to the small whorled pogonia (Isotria medeoloides), one of the rarest orchids in the Eastern United States as well as the rare swamp saxifrage (Saxifraga pensylvanica) and Blanding's turtle (Emys blandingii).
