= New Hampton School =

Prep school New Hampton, New Hampshire, US

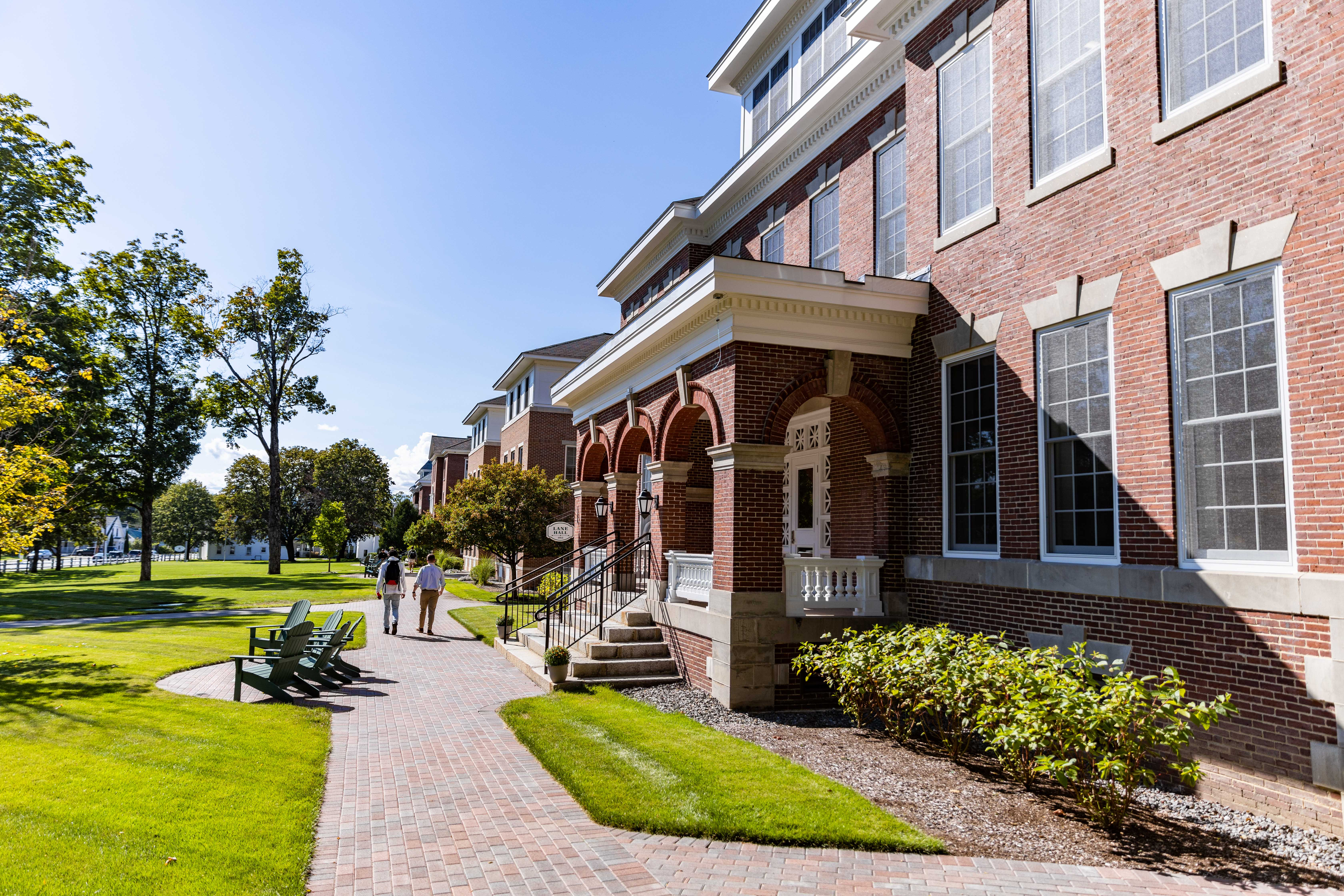
- Academic Row

Location
- 70 Main Street; New Hampton, New Hampshire; United States; 43°36′21″N 71°39′09″W

Information
- Type: Private, boarding, & day
- Established: 1821
- Head of school: David Perfield
- Faculty: 65
- Gender: Coeducational
- Enrollment: 330
- Average class size: 11
- Student to teacher ratio: 5:1
- Campus: Rural
- Colors: Green, black, and white
- Athletics conference: Lakes Region League, New England Preparatory School Athletic Council
- Mascot: Husky
- Rival: Tilton
- Website: www.newhampton.org

New Hampton School is an independent college preparatory high school in New Hampton, New Hampshire, United States. It has 330 students from over 30 states and 22 countries. The average class size is eleven, and the student-faculty ratio is five to one. New Hampton School does not require a uniform.

New Hampton School is a member of the Independent Schools Association of Northern New England and is accredited by the New England Association of Schools and Colleges. The school became an International Baccalaureate World School in 2010.

== History ==
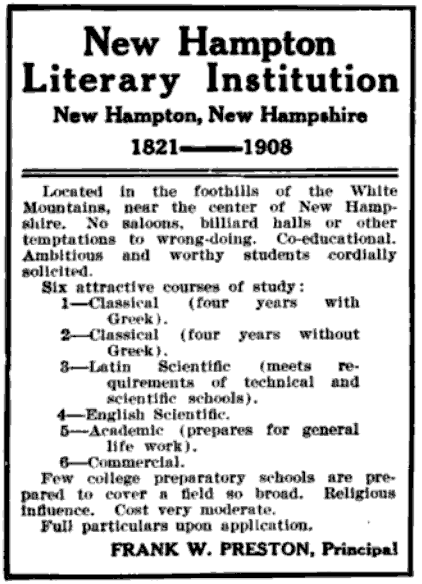
1909 advertisement for the school

New Hampton School was founded on June 27, 1821, as a Free Will Baptist-oriented, coeducational institution. On that day the State of New Hampshire issued a charter to the New Hampton Academy, "having had three several readings," before the House of Representatives. That charter, issued to William B. Kelley, Nathaniel Norris and Joshua Drake, provided the framework for the institution that would become the New Hampton School and emphasized the "promotion of science and the useful arts." The school was later known as the New Hampton Literary and Theological Institution. From 1854 to 1870, the Cobb Divinity School was affiliated with the institute before moving to Bates College in Maine.

Between 1925 and 1970 the school was a non-denominational school for boys. It returned to coeducation in 1970.

== Academics ==
New Hampton School serves a wide range of learnings, offering the International Baccalaureate Diploma Program, as well as an Academic Support Program with 30 years experience in serving students with diverse learning profiles. In 2022, the school launched an Entrepreneurial Studies Program that deploys Babson College's EPIC program and instills in entrepreneurial mindset in young learners.

== Athletics ==
The program admits fifth-year senior basketball players who seek an additional year of preparation before entering a Division I career. Recent examples include Will Davis and Travis Souza, both of whom went on to UC Irvine.

== Notable alumni ==
- Myles Ambrose (1926-2014), Commissioner of Customs under President Richard Nixon
- Zach Auguste (born 1993), basketball player
- Nahum Josiah Bachelder, governor of New Hampshire 1903–1905
- Cayla Barnes, ice hockey player for Boston College and US Women's National Team. Member of 2019, 2023, & 2025 World Championship teams. 2018 & 2026 Olympic gold medalist
- Jamaal Branch, NFL running back
- Elijah Bryant (born 1995), professional basketball player for Maccabi Tel Aviv of the Israeli Basketball Premier League and the EuroLeague; formerly in the NBA
- Oren B. Cheney founder of Bates College
- Nathan Clifford, United States Supreme Court justice
- Will Davis (born 1992), basketball player for NBA G League Ignite
- Aubrey Dawkins, basketball player
- Daniel C. Eddy, Speaker of Massachusetts House of Representatives, clergyman, hymnwriter
- John L. Edwards (1819–1895), Vermont attorney and politician who was the Democratic nominee for governor in 1867 and 1868
- Olivier Hanlan, basketball player
- Benjamin Franklin Hayes (1836-1905), state legislator, banker, and judge
- John Alfred Hayes, Civil War surgeon
- Roberto Hernandez, Major League Baseball player
- Harrison Carroll Hobart, Union Army colonel, second Speaker of the Wisconsin State Assembly
- Marv Hubbard, NFL football player
- Michael Kesselring, hockey player for Utah Mammoth
- Robert D. Kennedy, former CEO, Union Carbide
- Josh Kroenke, basketball player and NBA owner
- Tyler Lydon, basketball player
- Samuel W. McCall, governor of Massachusetts
- Rashad McCants, professional basketball player
- Hubie McDonough, professional hockey and basketball player, college and professional athletic administrator
- H. Jay Melosh, geophysicist
- Wes Miller, basketball coach
- Lawrence Moten, NBA basketball player
- Walter R. Peterson, Jr., governor of New Hampshire
- Will Rayman (born 1997), American-Israeli basketball player for Hapoel Haifa in the Israeli Basketball Premier League
- Cornelia Richards, author
- Michael Scanlan, president of Franciscan University of Steubenville
- Richard W. Sears, member of the Vermont state senate
- Pete Seibert, founder, Vail Ski Resort
- Ray Shero, National Hockey League administrator
- Charles Silvia - Hall of Fame swimming coach for Springfield College swimming from 1937-1978, winning ten New England Interscholastic Team Championships. He was Athletic Director at New Hampton School from 1934-1937, where he coached baseball, basketball, and soccer.
- Darius Songaila, professional basketball player
- Jared Terrell (born 1995), basketball player in the Israeli Basketball Premier League
- Jeffrey K. Tulis, political scientist
- Noah Vonleh, professional basketball player
- Lydia Fowler Wadleigh, educator
- Tyson Walker, college basketball player for the Michigan State Spartans
- John Wentworth, newspaper editor, mayor of Chicago and member of Congress
