= Maine School Administrative District 60 =

School district in York County, Maine, United States

Maine School Administrative District 60 (MSAD/RSU 60)

Location
- 100 Noble Way; North Berwick, Maine 03906
- Coordinates: 43.3066°N 70.7805°W

District information
- Type: Public
- Grades: PreK-12 and Adult
- Superintendent: Audra Beauvais
- Asst. superintendent(s): Susan S. Austin
- Budget: $47,550,000 (2022-23 FY)
- NCES District ID: 2314700

Students and staff
- Students: 2,987
- Teachers: 265
- Staff: 280
- Student–teacher ratio: 11.28:1

Other information
- Website: https://www.rsu60.org/

Maine School Administrative District 60 (MSAD/RSU 60) is the school district covering the towns of Berwick, North Berwick, and Lebanon, Maine.

== School Board Members ==
North Berwick Representatives
Lauren Janousek
Joshua Tabor
Kathleen Stanton Whalen (Board Chair)

Berwick Representatives
Marissa Tasker
Margaret Wheeler (Vice Chair)
Alison Herlihy

Lebanon Representatives
Melissa Cyr
Jeridene Basko
Nancy Sewell

== Schools in MSAD/RSU 60 ==
=== Noble High School ===
Noble High School is located at 100 Noble Way, North Berwick, Maine. NOBLE is an acronym for the three towns that the Noble schools serve (NOrth Berwick, Berwick, and LEbanon). It was originally located at 46 Cranberry Meadow Road, Berwick, Maine, prior to the construction of its new campus in 2001. It serves all three communities covered by MSAD/RSU 60, and since the 2012-2013 District Restructuring has housed 8th grade in addition to the traditional grades 9–12.

=== Middle Schools ===
Noble Middle School (NMS), originally known as Noble Junior High School, is a public middle school in Berwick that, like Noble High School, serves the three towns of MSAD/RSU 60. The structure that currently houses the middle school was formerly the home of Noble High School. NMS was initially housed in the building that currently houses one of the local Berwick elementary schools, Eric L. Knowlton School. Following the construction of the new Noble High School building in North Berwick in 2001, grades 7-8 of Noble Middle School relocated to the original Noble High School building, while grade 6 remained in the original building, renamed to Noble VI.

Noble Flex, also known as Noble Virtual Middle School or NVMS, is an online-based alternative to Noble Middle School. In 2021, MSAD/RSU #60 launched Noble Virtual Middle School in response to the COVID-19 pandemic. It was introduced as a possible initiation for a project-based K-12 virtual school system in the district. NVMS launched with 60 students in grades 6-8 and 5 staff members to lead the program. It currently serves grades 6–9.

=== Elementary Schools ===
==== North Berwick ====
- North Berwick Elementary School Grades K-5

==== Berwick ====
- Vivian E. Hussey School Grades K-3
- Eric L. Knowlton School Grades 4-5

==== Lebanon ====
- Hanson School Grades K-3
- Lebanon Elementary School Grades 4-5

=== Other ===
- Mary R. Hurd School Alternative education for grades 6–12.
- Noble Adult & Community Education Located within Noble High School

== Past District Restructuring ==
=== 2005 ===
In March 2005, the SAD 60 Board of Directors unanimously voted to close the Berwick Elementary School on Wilson Street, Berwick. At the time of the vote, the school had been in operation for 61 years, and held grades 4-5 since the construction of Vivian E. Hussey School. 4th-grade students would be reassigned to Vivian E. Hussey School and 5th-grade students would be added as Berwick V to Noble VI (now Eric L. Knowlton School). A May 2005 town referendum confirmed the directors' vote.

=== 2012-2013 ===
To alleviate overcrowding at some district schools and to better use underpopulated facilities, a restructuring plan was put into place and set to begin in 2012–2013. Instead of having K-4 kids in the Vivian E. Hussey School, the school now holds students K-3 while the Eric L. Knowlton School holds students 4-5 instead of the former 5–6. Also due to crowding, Noble Middle School moved the eighth grade into Noble High School and now holds students in grades 6-7 as opposed to the previous 7–8.
