= Berwick, Maine =

Town in Maine, United States

- Town
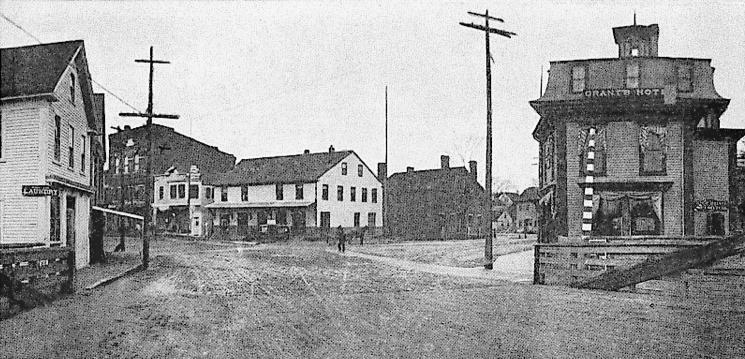
- Sullivan Square in 1907

- Seal Logo
- Nickname: The Berwicks
- Motto: "Where Tradition Meets Tomorrow"
- Location within Maine Location within the United States
- Coordinates: 43°16′12″N 70°51′42″W
- Country: United States
- State: Maine
- County: York
- Incorporated: 1713

Government
  - Type: Town Manager Plan

Area
  - Total: 37.86 sq mi (98.06 km^{2})
  - Land: 37.52 sq mi (97.18 km^{2})
  - Water: 0.34 sq mi (0.88 km^{2})
- Elevation: 338 ft (103 m)

Population (2020)
  - Total: 7,950
  - Density: 212/sq mi (81.8/km^{2})
- Time zone: UTC−5 (Eastern (EST))
  - Summer (DST): UTC−4 (EDT)
- ZIP Code: 03901
- Area code: 207
- FIPS code: 23-23031
- GNIS feature ID: 582351
- Website: www.berwickmaine.gov

Berwick is a town in York County, Maine, United States, situated in the southern part of the state beside the Salmon Falls River.

Today's South Berwick was set off from Berwick in 1814, while North Berwick was partitioned from the town in 1831.

The population was 7,950 at the 2020 census. The census-designated place of the same name located within the town has a population of 2,277. It is part of the Portland-South Portland-Biddeford metropolitan area.

== History ==
The area comprising modern Berwick, South Berwick, North Berwick, and the banks of the Salmon Falls River was originally known by its native Abenaki inhabitants as Newichawannock, meaning "river of many falls" or "land of great falls."

Originally part of Kittery, the area later comprised by Berwick was settled about 1631 by Ambrose Gibbens and called Kittery Commons or Kittery North Parish. Gibbens would eventually found a trading post to sell arms and ammunition to fellow white settlers.

The dense forests of Southern Maine provided large pine for shipbuilding, and the first sawmill in English America was built in the area that is now South Berwick on the Great Works Falls. It was colloquially known as Gibbens' Mill after the first settler of the Berwick area, and as many as 18 sawmills were eventually built in the area. Logging was a principal early industry. The first lumber exported from the American colonies was clapboards and barrel staves loaded aboard Pied Cowe at South Berwick in 1634.

Kittery North Parish was later called Unity after the ship that transported Scots prisoners of war from the Battle of Dunbar in 1650 to the colonies. These Scots had been force-marched to Durham Cathedral in Durham, England, then tried for treason for supporting Charles II rather than Oliver Cromwell, Lord Protector. Many settled near Berwick in an area near the northern Eliot-York border, which came to be known—and still is—as Scotland Bridge. Landing in Massachusetts, the royalist soldiers were sold as indentured servants, many of whom went to work at the Great Works mills until they were able to pay for their own freedom.

The raid by Indians in 1675 was the first of several during what was known as King Philip's War. In 1690–1691 during King William's War, the village was burned and abandoned in the Raid on Salmon Falls. During these raids, approximately 30 white settlers were killed and over 50 were captured. It was resettled in 1703 and renamed Newichawannock for a short time before again being renamed Berwick after Berwick-upon-Tweed, England. Neighboring Kittery requested that Berwick and its many mills be split into multiple independent municipalities before incorporation, but it was regardless incorporated by the Great and General Court on June 9, 1713, as the ninth town in what is now Maine.

The first schoolhouse in the state was built here in 1719.

The town was raided numerous times during Father Rale's War.

Berwick was once considerably larger in size. In 1749, the people of Berwick voted to divide the town into a northern and southern parish, known as Blackberry Hill and Old Fields, respectively. Distinct communities began to form around these parishes, and in 1814, South Berwick was granted a request to be set off, followed by North Berwick in 1831.

The introduction of the railroad in the mid 19th-century limited the town's reliance on its rivers as it continued to produce lumber. Beginning in the 19th century, Berwick had a symbiotic economic relationship with Somersworth, New Hampshire, the mill town to which it is connected by bridge. Additional industry eventually came to Berwick, such as Nute's Shoe Factory in the late 19th-century and Prime Tanning in the early 20th century. Prime Tanning grew to be an international producer of leather products but merged with a Chinese company in 2008 after declaring bankruptcy. Later that year it shuttered its headquarters in Berwick. In 2021, the town announced the construction of a new mixed-use development, named The Edge at Berwick, on the former property of Prime Tanning.

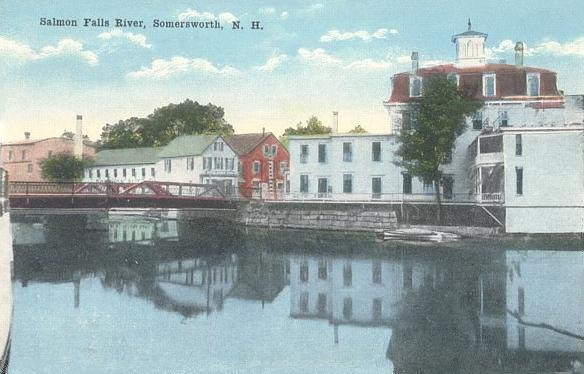
Berwick as seen from Somersworth, NH c. 1912

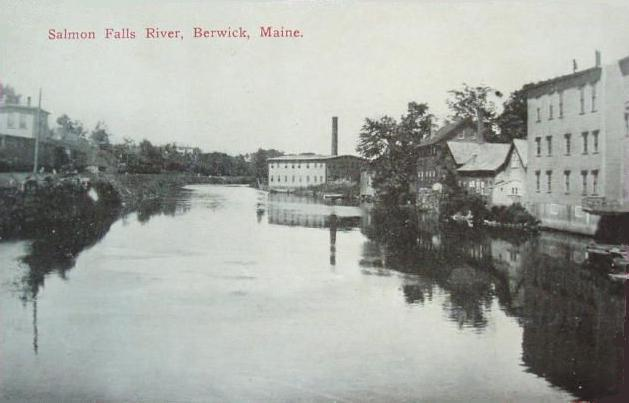
Looking up the Salmon Falls River in 1915

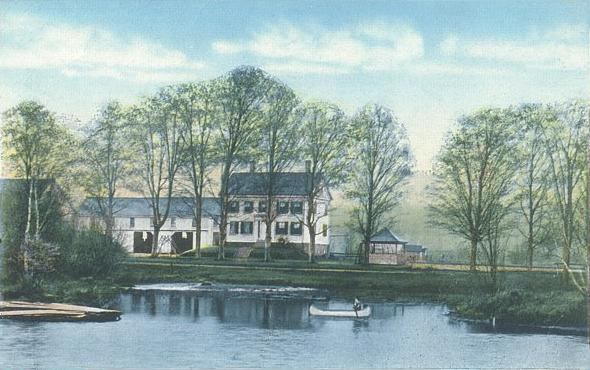
Rochester Street from the river in 1921

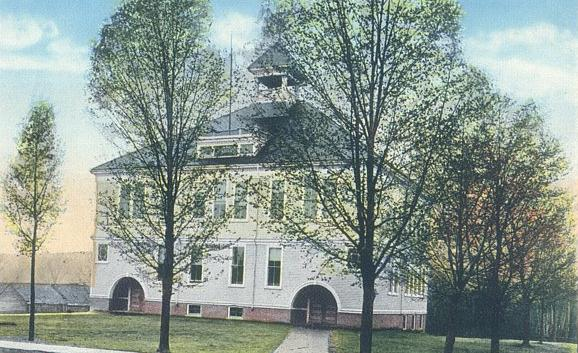
Old Sullivan High School about 1920

== Geography ==
According to the United States Census Bureau, the town has a total area of 37.86 square miles (98.06 km^{2}), of which 37.52 square miles (97.18 km^{2}) is land and 0.34 square miles (0.88 km^{2}) is water. Berwick is drained by the Little River and Salmon Falls River. Diamond Hill, at an elevation of 490 feet (149.4 m) above sea level, is the town's highest point. The lowest elevation, which is approximately 70 feet (21.3 m) above sea level, is on the Salmon River as it crosses the southernmost town border with South Berwick.

The town is served by state routes 9 and 236.

=== Climate ===
This climatic region is typified by large seasonal temperature differences, with warm to hot (and often humid) summers and cold (sometimes severely cold) winters. According to the Köppen Climate Classification system, Berwick has a humid continental climate, abbreviated "Dfb" on climate maps.

== Demographics ==
Historical population
Census	Pop.	Note	%±
1790	3,894		—
1800	3,891		−0.1%
1810	4,455		14.5%
1820	2,736		−38.6%
1830	3,168		15.8%
1840	1,698		−46.4%
1850	2,121		24.9%
1860	2,155		1.6%
1870	2,291		6.3%
1880	2,774		21.1%
1890	2,294		−17.3%
1900	2,280		−0.6%
1910	2,098		−8.0%
1920	2,057		−2.0%
1930	1,961		−4.7%
1940	1,971		0.5%
1950	2,166		9.9%
1960	2,738		26.4%
1970	3,136		14.5%
1980	4,149		32.3%
1990	5,995		44.5%
2000	6,353		6.0%
2010	7,246		14.1%
2020	7,950		9.7%

=== 2000 census ===
As of the census of 2000, there were 6,353 people, 2,319 households, and 1,723 families residing in the town. The population density was 171.1 inhabitants per square mile (66.1/km^{2}). There were 2,414 housing units at an average density of 65.0 per square mile (25.1/km^{2}). The racial makeup of the town was 97.31% White, 0.36% Black or African American, 0.14% Native American, 1.16% Asian, 0.03% Pacific Islander, 0.06% from other races, and 0.93% from two or more races. Hispanic or Latino of any race were 0.54% of the population.

There were 2,319 households, out of which 40.3% had children under the age of 18 living with them, 59.0% were married couples living together, 11.0% had a female householder with no husband present, and 25.7% were non-families. 20.4% of all households were made up of individuals, and 7.2% had someone living alone who was 65 years of age or older. The average household size was 2.72 and the average family size was 3.15.

In the town, the population was spread out, with 29.1% under the age of 18, 7.6% from 18 to 24, 32.5% from 25 to 44, 21.2% from 45 to 64, and 9.5% who were 65 years of age or older. The median age was 36 years. For every 100 females, there were 95.8 males. For every 100 females age 18 and over, there were 94.6 males.

The median income for a household in the town was $44,629, and the median income for a family was $53,776. Males had a median income of $36,329 versus $24,911 for females. The per capita income for the town was $18,988. About 6.9% of families and 8.3% of the population were below the poverty line, including 9.0% of those under age 18 and 15.9% of those age 65 or over.

=== 2010 census ===
As of the census of 2010, there were 7,246 people, 2,749 households, and 2,029 families residing in the town. The population density was 193.1 inhabitants per square mile (74.6/km^{2}). There were 2,934 housing units at an average density of 78.2 per square mile (30.2/km^{2}). The racial makeup of the town was 96.2% White, 0.5% African American, 0.2% Native American, 1.3% Asian, 0.2% from other races, and 1.6% from two or more races. Hispanic or Latino of any race were 1.3% of the population.

There were 2,749 households, of which 36.9% had children under the age of 18 living with them, 58.1% were married couples living together, 10.7% had a female householder with no husband present, 5.0% had a male householder with no wife present, and 26.2% were non-families. 20.6% of all households were made up of individuals, and 6.6% had someone living alone who was 65 years of age or older. The average household size was 2.62 and the average family size was 3.01.

The median age in the town was 39.1 years. 25.2% of residents were under the age of 18; 6.7% were between the ages of 18 and 24; 26.9% were from 25 to 44; 30.1% were from 45 to 64; and 11% were 65 years of age or older. The gender makeup of the town was 49.4% male and 50.6% female.

== Notable people ==
- Daniel B. Allyn, Vice Chief of Staff of the United States Army, 2014–2017
- John Jay Butler, minister and professor
- Hannah Tobey Farmer, philanthropist, writer, social reformer
- Benjamin Franklin Hayes, legislator and judge
- Frederick Hayes, Civil War veteran, awarded medal of honor
- John Alfred Hayes, Union Army physician
- Jeremy Kasten, film director, producer, editor and screenwriter
- Thomas Lavigne, state legislator
- Jonathan Lethem, writer
- Alphonso M. Lunt, army sergeant
- James Sullivan, seventh governor of Massachusetts
- Sarah Wilson English impostor, thief and convict who died on 1780 in Berwick.

== Schools ==
Berwick, Maine is part of MSAD60/RSU 60.

There are three schools in Berwick:

- Vivian E. Hussey School (K–2)
- Eric L. Knowlton School (3–4)
- Noble Middle School (5–6)

Students in grades 7–12 from Berwick attend Noble High School in the neighboring town of North Berwick.

== Downtown revitalization ==
The Town of Berwick was awarded several Brownfield grants in 2015, 2016 and 2017 to help with a downtown revitalization effort. On October 31, 2019, Great Falls Construction purchased the property and over the years has developed the site into The Edge at Berwick Maine.

The first commercial building at The Edge, completed in 2022, opened with eight businesses including a butcher shop, dental office, fitness studio, and other commercial tenants. Subsequent phases brought additional mixed-use buildings to the site, with the full development projected to include over 250 residential units and 30 commercial spaces.
