= 27th Maine Infantry Regiment =

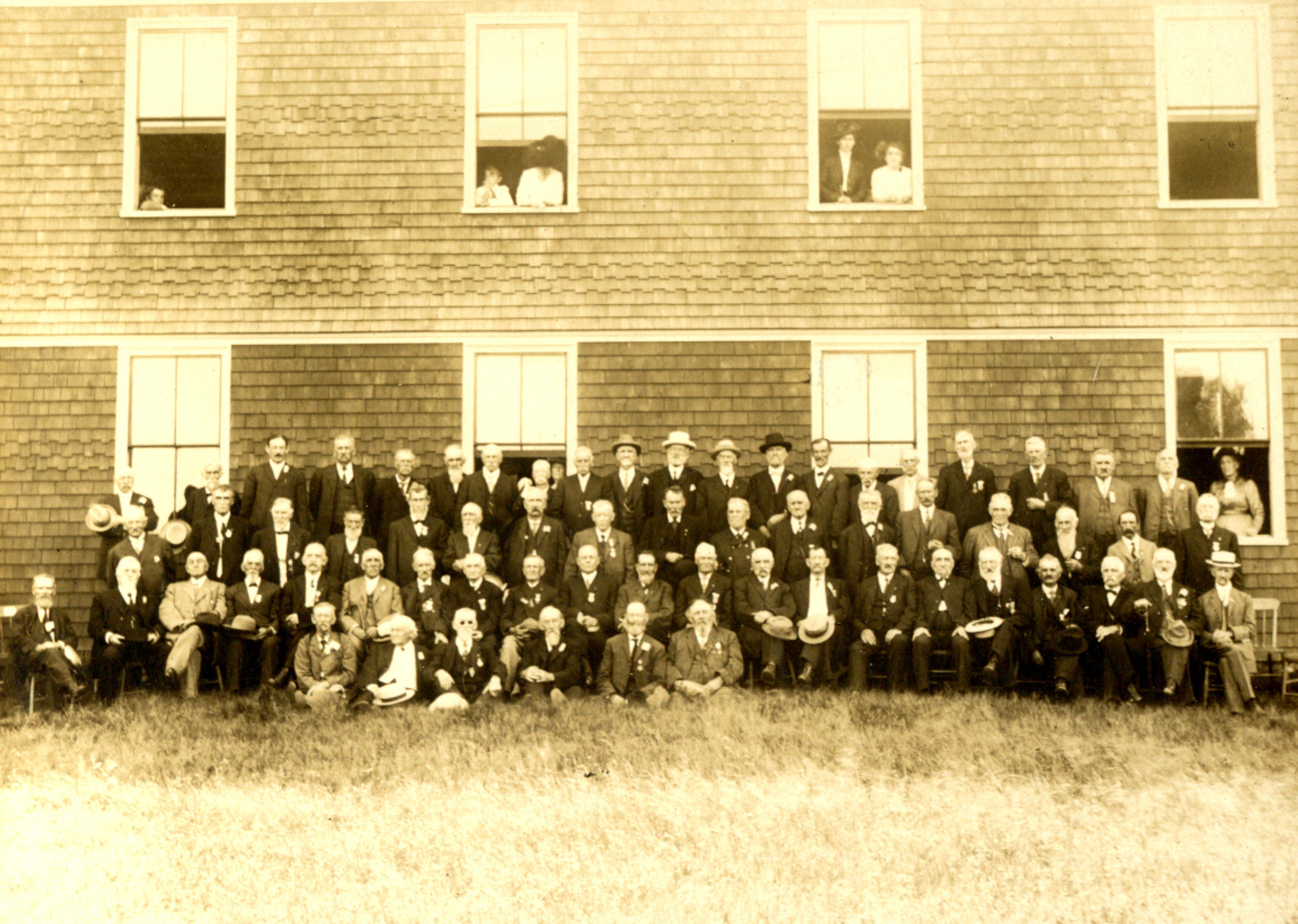
- Reunion of the 27th Maine Volunteers, Arundel, Maine, circa 1905
- Active: September 30, 1862, to July 17, 1863
- Country: United States
- Allegiance: Union
- Branch: Army
- Type: Infantry
- Engagements: None

The 27th Maine Infantry Regiment was a nine-month regiment raised for service in the Union Army during the American Civil War.

== Service ==
One of eight regiments raised by Maine in the fall of 1862 under the call for men to serve nine-month terms, the 27th Maine was formed primarily of volunteers from York County, Maine. They went into camp at Portland, Maine, on 10 September, with the officers being mustered into service on the 19th and the enlisted men on the 30th. After a short furlough home, and the addition of a few later enlistments to complete the regiment, they left for Washington, D.C. on 20 October 1862. The unit was attached to the XXII Corps, first belonging to Casey's Division and later to the division of General John Joseph Abercrombie. They served as pickets in the defenses of the capital through their entire term.

First encamped on East Capitol Hill upon their arrival in Washington, they soon moved to Arlington Heights, Virginia and afterward to Hunting Creek, where they went into winter quarters until March 1863. In the spring, they relocated along with the 25th Maine to Chantilly, Virginia and were there until 25 June, when they were transferred into the Army of the Potomac and ordered to report to General Slocum and the XII Corps at Leesburg, Virginia. This order was quickly changed, as it had not been known that the 1st Brigade (25th Maine and 27th Maine) were only nine-month units and their terms were about to expire, so they were instead sent to Arlington Heights for preparations to their mustering out and subsequent return to Maine.

== Volunteer service and the Medal of Honor ==
On the request of President Abraham Lincoln, Secretary of War Edwin Stanton sent letters on 28 June 1863 to the commanding officers of the 25th Maine and 27th Maine regiments, asking for them to remain beyond their contracted service due to the invasion of Pennsylvania by Robert E. Lee and his army. Declined first by the 25th Maine, the 27th was then asked, and over 300 men volunteered to remain beyond their service time in the defenses of Washington during what became the Gettysburg campaign. When Colonel Wentworth delivered the message to Secretary Stanton, he was informed that "Medals of Honor would be given to that portion of the regiment that volunteered to remain". With the battle soon over, they left Washington for home on 4 July, reuniting with the rest of the regiment in Portland for their mustering out on 17 July 1863. Following the end of the war, when the promise to award medals to the volunteers was fulfilled, there was a lack of an agreeable list of those who stayed behind in Washington. This resulted in some 864 medals being made, and it was left up to Wentworth to distribute them to those members he remembered staying behind with him. The MOH awarded to George Washington Emmons can be seen at Old Gordon Gravestones The award of these medals was later revoked by Congress in 1917, as it was determined the actions of the regiment did not meet the criteria for receiving such a medal.

== Commanders ==
With Colonel Rufus Tapley leaving the regiment in January 1863, Lieutenant Colonel Mark F. Wentworth resumed command of the unit. He was formerly of the Kittery militia, and stationed at Fort McClary during the early part of the Civil War. Following his service in the 27th Maine, he became commanding officer of the 32nd Maine Infantry Volunteers in February 1864, but had to resign on October due to being seriously wounded at the Battle of the Crater in July.

== Complement and casualties ==
There were a total of 949 men listed on the muster rolls for the 27th Maine. During their service, the regiment lost nineteen men by disease and one was killed by the accidental discharge of his musket.

== See also ==
- Medal of Honor
- List of Maine Civil War units
- Maine in the American Civil War
