= Great Works River =

River in United States of America

Coordinates: 43.21792°N 70.81206°W

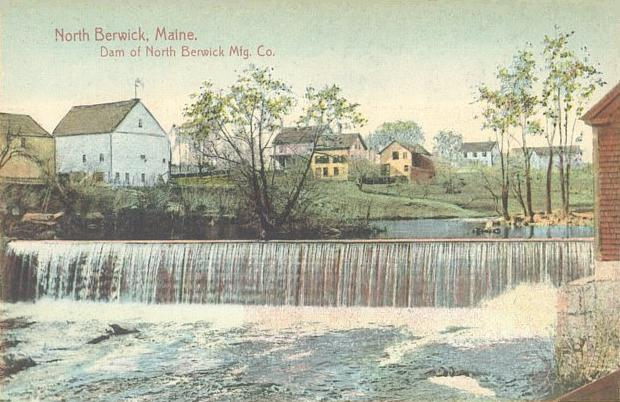
Great Works River c. 1910

The Great Works River is a 30.6-mile-long (49.2 km) river in southwestern Maine in the United States. It rises in central York County and flows generally south past North Berwick and joins the tidal part of the Salmon Falls River at South Berwick.

The native Newichawannock band of Abenaki called it the Asbenbedick. In July 1634, William Chadbourne, James Wall and John Goddard arrived from England aboard the ship Pied Cow with a commission to build a sawmill and gristmill at the river's Assabumbadoc Falls. The sawmill they built, thought to be the first over-shot water-powered site in America, was located in the "Rocky Gorge" below today's Brattle Street bridge. Their sawmill was rebuilt with up to 20 saws on what was then the "Little River" in 1651 by Richard Leader, an engineer granted exclusive right to the water power. It was thereafter called the "Great mill workes," from which the Great Works River derives its present name.
