= Little River (Salmon Falls River tributary) =

Coordinates: 43.30397°N 70.90228°W

Location
- Country: United States

Physical characteristics
- Source
  - location: Maine

The Little River is a 21.3-mile-long (34.3 km) tributary of the Salmon Falls River in the U.S. state of Maine. It rises from streams in York County, flows southwest through Lebanon, and reaches its confluence with the Salmon Falls River in Berwick.

== See also ==
- List of rivers of Maine
