= North Berwick, Maine =

- Town
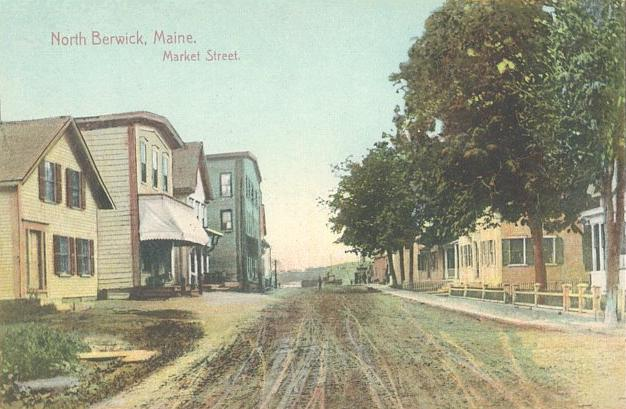
- Market Street c. 1910
- Nickname: The Berwicks
- Motto: "The Power to Choose"
- Location within Maine Location within the United States
- Coordinates: 43°22′42″N 70°46′23″W
- Country: United States
- State: Maine
- County: York
- Incorporated: March 22, 1831

Government
  - Type: Board of selectmen

Area
  - Total: 38.16 sq mi (98.83 km^{2})
  - Land: 38.02 sq mi (98.47 km^{2})
  - Water: 0.14 sq mi (0.36 km^{2})
- Elevation: 282 ft (86 m)

Population (2020)
  - Total: 4,978
  - Density: 131/sq mi (50.6/km^{2})
- Time zone: UTC-5 (Eastern (EST))
  - Summer (DST): UTC-4 (EDT)
- ZIP code: 03906
- Area code: 207
- FIPS code: 23-50325
- GNIS feature ID: 582628
- Website: www.townofnorthberwick.org

North Berwick is a town in York County, Maine, United States. The town was set off from Berwick in 1831, following South Berwick in 1814.

North Berwick's population was 4,978 at the 2020 census. It contains the census-designated place of the same name. It is part of the Portland–South Portland–Biddeford, Maine metropolitan statistical area.

== History ==
Originally a part of Kittery called Kittery Commons, the area was first settled in 1693 by John Morrell, a Quaker who built a log cabin on Wells Street. It was set off from Kittery in 1713 as part of Berwick, named for Berwick-upon-Tweed on the Anglo-Scottish border. Doughty Falls in the Great Works River provided water power for a sawmill, gristmill and carding mill. After the Revolutionary War, the small mill town grew rapidly. It was set off and incorporated as North Berwick on March 22, 1831. The town was named after Berwick, England.

Development was spurred in 1842 by the arrival of the Portland, Saco & Portsmouth Railroad, joined by the Boston & Maine Railroad in 1873. North Berwick became a railroad hub from which its manufactured goods were shipped, including lumber, shingles, clapboards, wooden boxes, firewood, bricks, carriages, caskets, clocks, stove and shoe polish, toboggans and sleds. Also loaded aboard the boxcars were barrels of apples, blocks of ice cut from frozen ponds, granite from quarries, and tins of corn packed at a canning factory. But the 2 biggest North Berwick businesses during the 19th-century made woolens and farm implements.

In 1834, the Maine Legislature incorporated Lang, Hill & Company to manufacture woolen blankets, called "printing blankets," at a mill beside the Great Works River. Renamed the North Berwick Company, by 1850 its principal owner was "Friend" William Hill, who trained as a machinist at the Great Falls Manufacturing Company in Somersworth, New Hampshire. The wooden mill was destroyed by fire in 1861 but rebuilt in brick in 1862. It produced blankets for Civil War troops. The factory had 40 looms turning out 1,500 yards of flannel daily, in addition to blankets. In 1955, the North Berwick Company would close. Its landmark Greek Revival building was used as the Parrish Shoes factory in the 1995 movie Jumanji, and has since been renovated and adapted as housing.

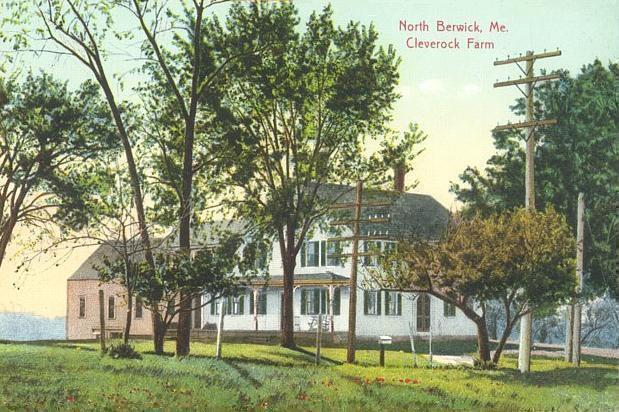
Cleverock Farm in 1907

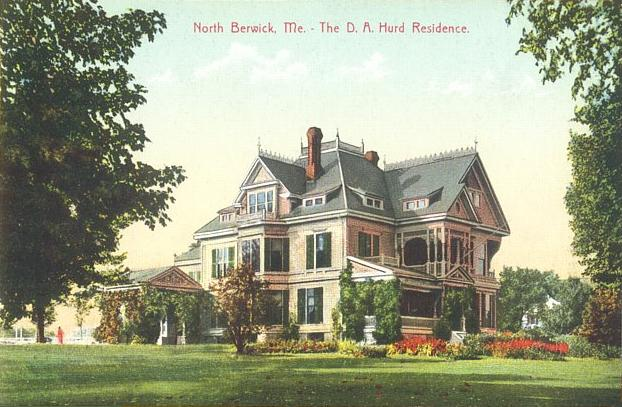
Hurd Manor c. 1910

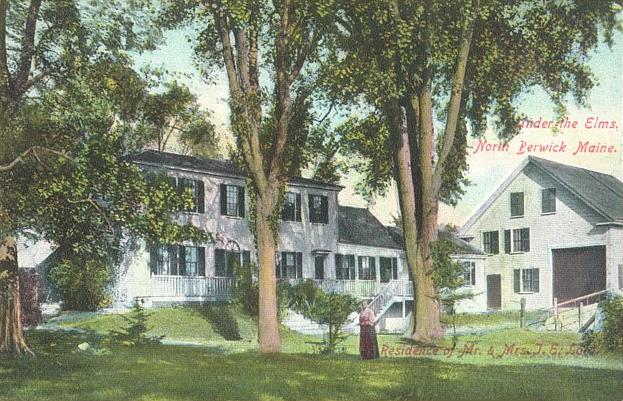
J. E. Lord House in 1910

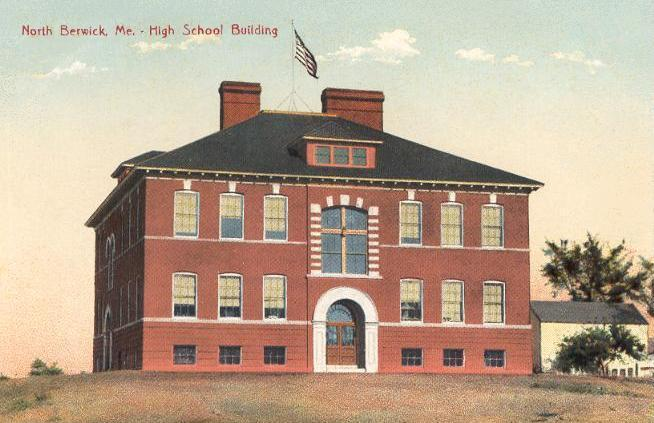
High School in 1910, now Town Offices

== Geography ==
According to the United States Census Bureau, the town has a total area of 38.16 square miles (98.83 km^{2}), of which 38.02 square miles (98.47 km^{2}) is land and 0.14 square miles (0.36 km^{2}) is water. North Berwick is drained by the Great Works River and its tributary, the Negutaquet River. Bauneg Beg Mountain, at an elevation of 866 feet (264 m) above sea level, is the town's highest point.

== Demographics ==
Historical population
Census	Pop.	Note	%±
1840	1,461		—
1850	1,593		9.0%
1860	1,492		−6.3%
1870	1,623		8.8%
1880	1,801		11.0%
1890	1,803		0.1%
1900	1,748		−3.1%
1910	1,777		1.7%
1920	1,652		−7.0%
1930	1,540		−6.8%
1940	1,455		−5.5%
1950	1,655		13.7%
1960	1,844		11.4%
1970	2,224		20.6%
1980	2,878		29.4%
1990	3,793		31.8%
2000	4,293		13.2%
2010	4,576		6.6%
2020	4,978		8.8%
U.S. Decennial Census

=== 2010 census ===
As of the census of 2010, there were 4,576 people, 1,773 households, and 1,269 families residing in the town. The population density was 120.4 inhabitants per square mile (46.5/km^{2}). There were 1,930 housing units at an average density of 50.8 units per square mile (19.6 units/km^{2}). The racial makeup of the town was 97.1% White, 0.5% African American, 0.3% Native American, 0.7% Asian, 0.3% from other races, and 1.0% from two or more races. Hispanic or Latino of any race were 1.4% of the population.

There were 1,773 households, of which 32.7% had children under the age of 18 living with them, 59.2% were married couples living together, 8.8% had a female householder with no husband present, 3.6% had a male householder with no wife present, and 28.4% were non-families. 21.7% of all households were made up of individuals, and 8.1% had someone living alone who was 65 years of age or older. The average household size was 2.54 and the average family size was 2.97.

The median age in the town was 42.3 years. 22.7% of residents were under the age of 18; 7.1% were between the ages of 18 and 24; 23.6% were from 25 to 44; 32.2% were from 45 to 64, and 14.3% were 65 years of age or older. The gender makeup of the town was 49.0% male and 51.0% female.

=== 2000 census ===
As of the census of 2000, there were 4,293 people, 1,587 households, and 1,177 families residing in the town. The population density was 112.1 inhabitants per square mile (43.3/km^{2}). There were 1,705 housing units at an average density of 44.5 units per square mile (17.2 units/km^{2}). The racial makeup of the town was 97.09% White, 0.65% Black or African American, 0.23% Native American, 0.77% Asian, 0.05% Pacific Islander, 0.07% from other races, and 1.14% from two or more races. Hispanic or Latino of any race were 0.61% of the population.

There were 1,587 households, out of which 36.0% had children under the age of 18 living with them, 61.7% were married couples living together, 8.3% had a female householder with no husband present, and 25.8% were non-families. 19.2% of all households were made up of individuals, and 6.4% had someone living alone who was 65 years of age or older. The average household size was 2.67 and the average family size was 3.07.

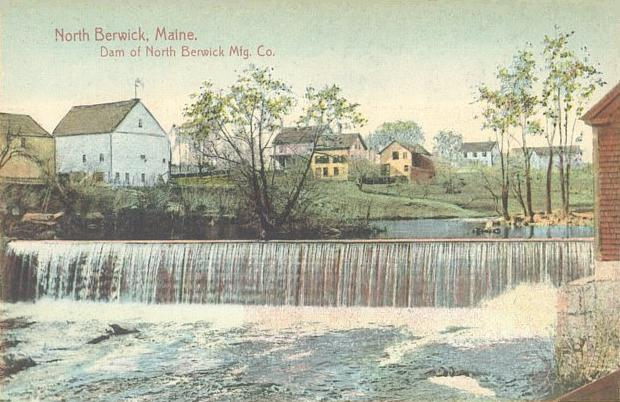
Dam on the Great Works River c. 1910

In the town, the population was spread out, with 26.8% under the age of 18, 6.2% from 18 to 24, 31.1% from 25 to 44, 25.6% from 45 to 64, and 10.3% who were 65 years of age or older. The median age was 38 years. For every 100 females, there were 97.2 males. For every 100 females age 18 and over, there were 96.0 males.

The median income for a household in the town was $46,883, and the median income for a family was $51,753. Males had a median income of $35,938 versus $26,007 for females. The per capita income for the town was $19,558. About 4.2% of families and 5.4% of the population were below the poverty line, including 9.2% of those under age 18 and 1.0% of those age 65 or over.

== Economy ==
Local farmer William Hussey designed a cast iron plow in 1835, which led to the founding of the Hussey Plow Company. The North Berwick firm fabricated farm implements. It evolved into the Hussey Manufacturing Company, which produced a variety of items including sewer grates, manhole covers, ladders, ski jumps and chair lifts. Today, it is the Hussey Seating Company, a manufacturer of seats for auditoriums, bleachers for stadiums as well as other spectator facilities. In 2003, it was honored as Maine's oldest family-owned business.

The town's other major contemporary employer is a Pratt & Whitney aircraft engine parts factory and overhaul facility. Built as Simplex Wire & Cable, the structure was purchased and expanded by Pratt & Whitney in 1979 to cover 875,000 square feet (81,300 m^{2}), making it the largest manufacturing plant under one roof in Maine.

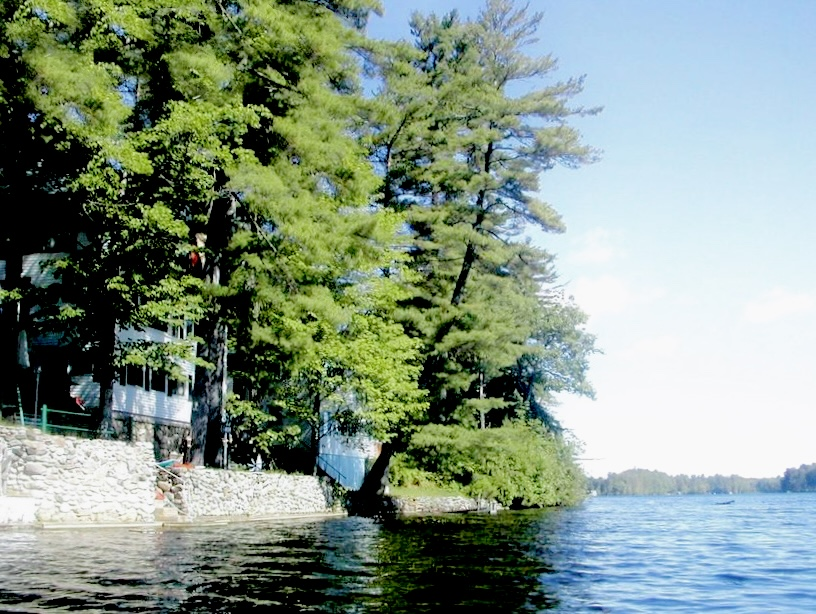
Bauneg Beg Lake

== Parks and recreation ==
North Berwick includes Bauneg Beg Pond, a recreational area.

== Education ==
North Berwick is part of MSAD60/RSU 60.

North Berwick is home to three schools: Noble High School, North Berwick Primary School and the Mary R. Hurd School. Middle school students attend Noble Middle School in the neighboring town of Berwick.

== Notable people ==
- James N. Buffum, Massachusetts politician; born in North Berwick
- Paul Chadbourne, educator and naturalist; born in North Berwick
- Mark Eves, Speaker of the Maine House of Representatives
- Ichabod Goodwin, 27th governor of New Hampshire
- John W. Goodwin, minister
- Daniel Johnson Morrell, Republican member of the U.S. House of Representatives from Pennsylvania
