= List of Karen Gillan performances =

Performances by Karen Gillan

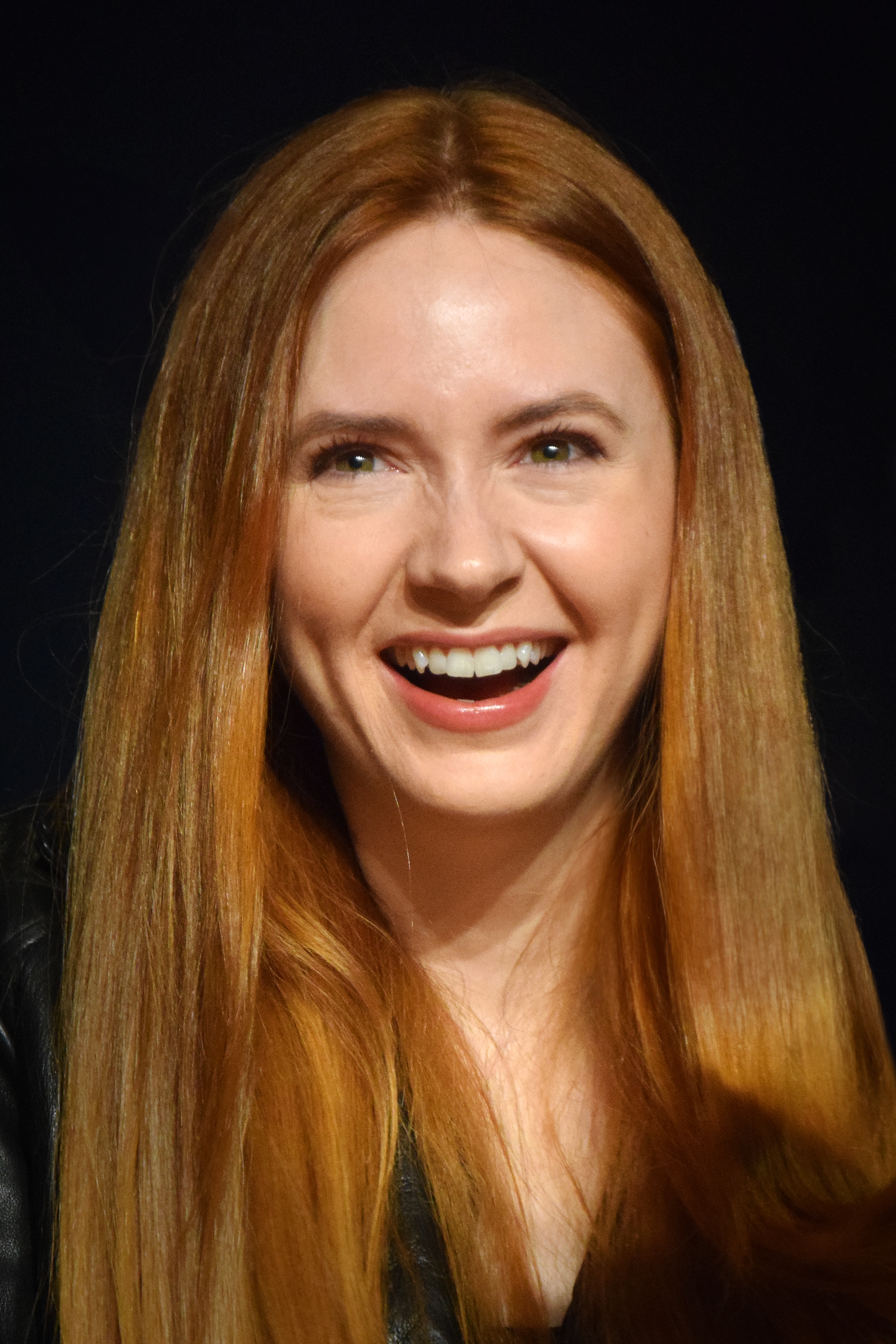
Karen Gillan at the 2023 New York Comic Con

The following is the complete list of performances by Scottish actress Karen Gillan.

Key
†	Denotes films that have not yet been released

== Film ==
Year	Title	Role	Notes	Ref.
2010	Outcast	Ally		
2013	Not Another Happy Ending	Jane Lockhart		
2013	Oculus	Kaylie Russell		
2014	Guardians of the Galaxy	Nebula		
2015	The Big Short	Evie		
2016	In a Valley of Violence	Ellen		
2017	Guardians of the Galaxy Vol. 2	Nebula		
2017	The Circle	Annie Allerton		
2017	Alex & the List	Lily		
2017	Jumanji: Welcome to the Jungle	Martha		
2018	The Party's Just Beginning	Liusaidh	Also director and writer	
2018	Avengers: Infinity War	Nebula		
2018	All Creatures Here Below	Ruby		
2019	Stuber	Sara Morris		
2019	Avengers: Endgame	Nebula		
2019	Spies in Disguise	Eyes	Voice	
2019	Jumanji: The Next Level	Ruby		
2020	The Call of the Wild	Mercedes		
2021	Gunpowder Milkshake	Sam		
2022	Dual	Sarah/Sarah's double		
2022	The Bubble	Carol Cobb/Dr. Lacey Nightingale		
2022	Next Exit	Dr. Stevenson		
2022	Thor: Love and Thunder	Nebula		
2023	Late Bloomers	Louise		
2023	Guardians of the Galaxy Vol. 3	Nebula		
2024	Sleeping Dogs	Laura Baines		
2024	The Life of Chuck	Felicia Gordon		
2026	Let's Have Kids!	Emma	Direct-to-video film	
2026	Jumanji: Open World †	Ruby	Post-production	
TBA	Highlander †	Heather MacLeod	Filming	

== Television ==
Year	Title	Role	Notes	Ref.
2006	Rebus	Teri Cotter	Episode: "A Question of Blood"	
2008	Doctor Who	Soothsayer	Episode: "The Fires of Pompeii"	
2008	Stacked	Ginny Turner	TV movie	
2008	Harley Street	Holly	Episode #1.1	
2008	Coming Up	Anna	Episode: "Thinspiration"	
2008–2009	The Kevin Bishop Show	Various	Main cast	
2009	The Well	Coll	Main cast	
2010–2013	Doctor Who	Amy Pond	Main cast (series 5–7, 2013 special)	
2010	Doctor Who Prom (2010)	Herself	Presenter of the event	
2012	We'll Take Manhattan	Jean Shrimpton	TV movie	
2012	In Love With...	Laura	Episode: "In Love with Coward"	
2013	NTSF:SD:SUV::	Daisy	Main cast	
2014	A Touch of Cloth	Kerry Newblood	Main cast (series 3)	
2014	Selfie	Eliza Dooley	Main cast	
2015	Comedy Bang! Bang!	Herself	Episode: "Karen Gillan Wears a Black and White Striped Pullover and Coral Skirt"	
2015	7 Days in Hell	Lily Allsworth	TV movie	
2015	Robot Chicken	Various	Voice roles, episode: "Zero Vegetables"	
2016	Emo Dad	Jessica	Voice role, 5 episodes	
2019	Neurotica	Chloe	Episode: "Eureka!"	
2020	Cake	Herself	1 episode, segment: "Auditions: The Sex Scene (Part 2)"	
2021	Calls	Sara	Voice role, episode: "The End"	
2021–2024	What If...?	Nebula	Voice role, 4 episodes	
2022	The Guardians of the Galaxy Holiday Special	Nebula	Television special	
2023	The Simpsons	Maisie MacWeldon-MacDougal	Voice role, 2 episodes	
2023	Marvel Studios: Assembled	Herself	Episode: "The Making of Guardians of the Galaxy Vol. 3"	
2024	Douglas Is Cancelled	Madeline Crow	Limited-run series, main cast	
TBA	Shrinking †		Filming; recurring role (season 4)	

== Short films ==
Year	Title	Role	Notes
2014	Bound for Greatness	Maeve MacDonough	
2015	Warning Labels	Mindy	
2015	Coward	—N/a	Director, writer, and executive producer
2015	Fun Size Horror: Volume Two	Rachel Milligan	Segment: "Conventional", also director and writer
2019	The Hoarding	Hope	Director and writer

== Music videos ==
Year	Title	Artist
2014	"Happy Idiot"	TV on the Radio

== Video games ==
Year	Title	Role	Notes
2010–2011	Doctor Who: The Adventure Games	Amy Pond	Series 1–2
2010	Doctor Who: Evacuation Earth	Amy Pond	
2010	Doctor Who: Return to Earth	Amy Pond	

== Stage ==
Year	Title	Role	Venue
2011	Inadmissible Evidence	Shirley	Donmar Warehouse
2013	Time to Act	Karen	24 Hour Plays, American Airlines Theatre
