= Jumanji =

American media franchise

- The current logo of the franchise
- Created by: Chris Van Allsburg
- Original work: Jumanji (1981)
- Owner: Sony Pictures Entertainment
- Years: 1981–present

Print publications
- Books: Jumanji (1981); Zathura (2002)

Films and television
- Films: Jumanji (1995); Zathura: A Space Adventure (2005); Jumanji: Welcome to the Jungle (2017); Jumanji: The Next Level (2019); Jumanji: Open World (2026)
- Animated series: Jumanji (1996–1999)

Games
- Traditional: Jumanji: The Game (1995); Zathura: Adventure is Waiting (2005); Jumanji: The Game (2017)
- Video games: List of video games

Audio
- Soundtracks: List of soundtracks

Jumanji is an American media franchise, based on the children's book Jumanji (1981) and its sequel Zathura (2002), written by Chris Van Allsburg. The first film was produced by TriStar Pictures, and subsequent films by Columbia Pictures, both subsidiaries of Sony Pictures. The franchise follows the adventures of various people who find themselves imperiled when playing an enchanted game that comes with a variety of dangerous jungle elements that the players must survive as they play. Ultimately, the only way to end the disruptions is to finish the game while enduring its dangers.

The franchise includes the films Jumanji (1995), Zathura: A Space Adventure (2005), Jumanji: Welcome to the Jungle (2017), Jumanji: The Next Level (2019) and an animated television series which aired from 1996 to 1999. A fifth film titled Jumanji: Open World, is set to be released on December 25, 2026. The first film received mixed reviews from critics, while the three follow-up films received positive critical response. The films have grossed $2 billion collectively at the global box office.

== Origin ==
=== Jumanji (1981) ===
Two children, Peter and Judy, find and play a game where each roll of the dice brings the jungle from the game (as well as the creatures that live in it) to life around them. In order to reset the world around them, they must finish the game and make it to the titular city of gold. Afterward, they get rid of the game which is found by their next-door neighbors, two young brothers.

=== Zathura (2002) ===
Brothers Danny and Walter, neighbors of Peter and Judy from the previous book, find Jumanji but ultimately choose not to play it. Instead, they find a similar game on the same board with a space theme, Zathura, which they begin to play. As with Jumanji, playing Zathura brings elements of the game into reality, and in order to set everything back to normal, the boys must complete the game.

== Films ==
Film	U.S. release date	Director	Screenwriters	Story by	Producers
Jumanji	December 15, 1995	Joe Johnston	Jim Strain, Greg Taylor & Jonathan Hensleigh	Jim Strain, Greg Taylor & Chris Van Allsburg	Scott Kroopf and William Teitler
Zathura: A Space Adventure	November 11, 2005	Jon Favreau	John Kamps & David Koepp	John Kamps & David Koepp	Scott Kroopf, William Teitler and Michael De Luca
Jumanji: Welcome to the Jungle	December 20, 2017	Jake Kasdan	Erik Sommers, Jeff Pinkner, Chris McKenna & Scott Rosenberg	Chris McKenna	Matt Tolmach and William Teitler
Jumanji: The Next Level	December 13, 2019	Jake Kasdan	Jake Kasdan, Jeff Pinkner & Scott Rosenberg	Jake Kasdan, Jeff Pinkner & Scott Rosenberg	Matt Tolmach, Dwayne Johnson, Dany Garcia, Hiram Garcia and Jake Kasdan
Jumanji: Open World	December 25, 2026	Jake Kasdan	Jake Kasdan, Jeff Pinkner & Scott Rosenberg	Jake Kasdan, Jeff Pinkner & Scott Rosenberg	Matt Tolmach, Dwayne Johnson, Dany Garcia, Hiram Garcia and Jake Kasdan

=== Jumanji (1995) ===
Two children find and play a magical board game. In doing so, they release a man trapped for decades in the game and a host of dangers from the jungle that can only be stopped by finishing the game.

=== Zathura: A Space Adventure (2005) ===
Two young brothers are drawn into an intergalactic adventure when their house is hurled through the depths of space by the magical board game they are playing. Furthermore, the brothers surmise the only way to return home is to finish the game.

Though there are no direct references to Jumanji in Zathura: A Space Adventure and the movie's plot is self-contained, the studio marketed it as being set within the same fictional universe, and is thematically similar to the other franchise installments. The film is based on the children's book Zathura, also written by Van Allsburg, which was a sequel to the Jumanji novel. Despite the film's placement within the same fictional universe, director Jon Favreau discourages the notion that the film is a direct sequel, having not particularly liked Jumanji.

=== Jumanji: Welcome to the Jungle (2017) ===
Twenty-two years after the events of the original film, after being ignored for more modern entertainment, the board game magically becomes a video game. Four high school teenagers are transported to the game's jungle setting and become the avatars of the characters they chose, and later discover another victim trapped in the game as well. The only way out is to complete the game and in doing so, they each discover the best of themselves and win with a newfound heroism to see the challenge through. The film served as a direct sequel to the 1995 film.

=== Jumanji: The Next Level (2019) ===
The team of friends return to Jumanji to rescue one of their own but discover that nothing is as they expect. The players need to brave parts unknown, from arid deserts to snowy mountains, in order to escape the world's most dangerous game.

=== Jumanji: Open World (2026) ===
In December 2019, Dwayne Johnson revealed that the next installment in the franchise would reveal that the villain from The Next Level, Jurgen the Brutal, was an avatar in the game and that the identity of the player controlling him would be explored.

In March 2020, Jake Kasdan confirmed early developments for a follow-up film. Kasdan confirmed plans to maintain the core cast of the previous two films. The following month, the filmmaker stated that the story for the next installment was in development. It was later reported that the follow-up film was delayed due to the COVID-19 pandemic. In October 2022, producer Hiram Garcia stated that Kasdan would prioritize the next Jumanji movie, following the completion of his directorial responsibilities on Red One (2024). In March 2023, cast member Kevin Hart indicated that the film currently in development would be the final film in the series. In October 2024, the movie was given a release date. Marketing commenced for the project with a promotional poster release at the 2025 CinemaCon. By November 2024, Kasdan expressed interest in having Kirsten Dunst and Bonnie Hunt reprise their roles from the original film.

In October 2025, it was announced that Brittany O'Grady and Burn Gorman had joined the cast; with principal photography scheduled to commence the following month.

Jumanji: Open World was scheduled to be released theatrically on December 11, 2026. On March 24, 2026, the release date was delayed by two weeks to its current release date of December 25, 2026.

== Television ==
=== Jumanji (1996–1999) ===
Jumanji was an animated television series inspired by the 1995 film which ran for three seasons from 1996 to 1999.

== Main cast and characters ==
List indicators

This section includes characters who will appear or have appeared in the franchise.

- An empty grey cell indicates the character was not in the film, or that the character's official presence has not yet been confirmed.
- ^{C} indicates a cameo role.
- ^{O} indicates an older version of the character.
- ^{U} indicates an uncredited appearance.
- ^{V} indicates a voice-only role.
- ^{Y} indicates a younger version of the character.
- ^{A} indicates a video game avatar of the character.

Character	Films					Television series			Video games	
Character	Jumanji	Zathura: A Space Adventure	Jumanji: Welcome to the Jungle	Jumanji: The Next Level	Jumanji: Open World	Jumanji			Jumanji: The Video Game	Jumanji: Wild Adventures
Character	Jumanji	Zathura: A Space Adventure	Jumanji: Welcome to the Jungle	Jumanji: The Next Level	Jumanji: Open World	Season 1	Season 2	Season 3	Jumanji: The Video Game	Jumanji: Wild Adventures
Alan Parrish III	Robin Williams Adam Hann-Byrd^{Y}		Mentioned			Bill Fagerbakke^{V}	Bill Fagerbakke^{V}	Bill Fagerbakke^{V} Justin Jon Ross^{V}^{Y}		
Judith "Judy" Shepherd	Kirsten Dunst					Debi Derryberry^{V}	Debi Derryberry^{V}	Debi Derryberry^{V}		
Peter Shepherd	Bradley Pierce					Ashley Johnson^{V}	Ashley Johnson^{V}	Ashley Johnson^{V} Cam Clarke^{O}^{V}		
Sarah Whittle	Bonnie Hunt Laura Bell Bundy^{Y}		Mentioned							
Professor Van Pelt (Note: In Jumanji: Welcome to the Jungle, Van Pelt has a different first name depending on the region in which the film is watched. In the UK version of the film, the character's first name is given as "John Hardin", while in the US version of the film, the character is provided the first name "Russell".)	Jonathan Hyde		Bobby Cannavale			Sherman Howard^{V}	Sherman Howard^{V}	Sherman Howard^{V}		
Nora Shepherd	Bebe Neuwirth			Bebe Neuwirth^{C}	Bebe Neuwirth	Melanie Chartoff^{V}	Melanie Chartoff^{V}	Melanie Chartoff^{V}		
Walter Budwing The Astronaut		Josh Hutcherson Dax Shepard^{O}								
Daniel "Danny" Budwing		Jonah Bobo								
Lisa Budwing		Kristen Stewart								
Mr. Budwing		Tim Robbins								
the Robot		Frank Oz^{V}								
Dr. Xander "Smolder" Bravestone			Dwayne Johnson^{A}	Dwayne Johnson^{A}	Dwayne Johnson^{A}				Andrew Morgado	Andrew Morgado
Franklin "Mouse" Finbar			Kevin Hart^{A}	Kevin Hart^{A}	Kevin Hart^{A}				Phil LaMarr	Dempsey Pappion
Professor Sheldon "Shelly" Oberon			Jack Black^{A}	Jack Black^{A}	Jack Black^{A}				Mick Wingert	Mick Wingert
Ruby Roundhouse "Killer of Men"			Karen Gillan^{A}	Karen Gillan^{A}	Karen Gillan^{A}				Anna Graves	Anna Graves
Jefferson "Seaplane" McDonough			Nick Jonas^{A}	Nick Jonas^{A}	Nick Jonas^{A}					
Spencer Gilpin			Alex Wolff	Alex Wolff	Alex Wolff					
Anthony "Fridge" Johnson			Ser'Darius Blain	Ser'Darius Blain	Ser'Darius Blain					
Bethany Walker			Madison Iseman	Madison Iseman	Madison Iseman					
Martha Kaply			Morgan Turner	Morgan Turner	Morgan Turner					
Dr. Xander "Smolder" Bravestone				Zachary Tzegaegbe^{U}^{A}						
Alexander "Alex" Vreeke			Colin Hanks^{U} Mason Gussione^{Y}	Colin Hanks						
Eddie Gilpin				Danny DeVito	Danny DeVito					
Milo Walker				Danny Glover						
Ming Fleetfoot				Awkwafina^{A}	Awkwafina^{A}					
Jurgen the Brutal				Rory McCann						
Heater Repair Man				Lamorne Morris^{C}	Lamorne Morris					
Carl Bentley	David Alan Grier					Richard Allen^{V}	Richard Allen^{V}	Richard Allen^{V}		
Samuel "Sam" Parrish	Jonathan Hyde									
Carol Parrish	Patricia Clarkson									
Exterminator	James Handy									
Nigel Billingsley			Rhys Darby	Rhys Darby	Rhys Darby				Rhys Darby	Rhys Darby
Janice Gilpin			Marin Hinkle	Marin Hinkle	Marin Hinkle					
Principal Bentley			Marc Evan Jackson							
Mr. Vreeke			Tim Matheson^{U} Sean Buxton^{Y}							
Bethany Vreeke			Uncredited actress	Madison Johnson						

== Additional crew and production details ==
Film	Crew/detail					
Film	Composer	Cinematographer	Editor(s)	Production companies	Distributor(s)	Running time
Jumanji	James Horner	Thomas E. Ackerman	Robert Dalva	Teitler Films; TriStar Pictures; Interscope Communications	Sony Pictures Releasing	104 minutes
Zathura: A Space Adventure	John Debney	Guillermo Navarro	Dan Lebental	Teitler Films; Radar Pictures; Columbia Pictures; Jon Favreau Films; Michael De Luca Productions	Sony Pictures Releasing	101 minutes
Jumanji: Welcome to the Jungle	Henry Jackman	Gyula Pados	Steve Edwards; Mark Helfrich	Radar Pictures; Columbia Pictures; Seven Bucks Productions; Matt Tolmach Productions	Sony Pictures Releasing	119 minutes
Jumanji: The Next Level	Henry Jackman	Gyula Pados	Tara Timpone; Steve Edwards; Mark Helfrich	Columbia Pictures; Hartbeat Productions; Seven Bucks Productions; Matt Tolmach Productions; The Detective Agency Entertainment	Sony Pictures Releasing	123 minutes
Jumanji: Open World	Henry Jackman	Ben Davis	Mark Helfrich	Columbia Pictures; Seven Bucks Productions; Matt Tolmach Productions; The Detective Agency Entertainment	Sony Pictures Releasing	TBA

== Reception ==
=== Box office performance ===
Film	Year	Box office gross			Budget	Ref.
Film	Year	North America	Other territories	Worldwide	Budget	Ref.
Jumanji	1995	$100,499,940	$162,322,000	$262,821,940	$65 million	
Zathura: A Space Adventure	2005	$29,258,869	$35,820,235	$65,079,104	$65 million	
Jumanji: Welcome to the Jungle	2017	$404,540,171	$558,002,774	$962,542,945	$90 million	
Jumanji: The Next Level	2019	$320,314,960	$481,378,969	$801,693,929	$125 million	
Total		$853,498,980	$1,270,320,150	$2,124,934,090	$338 million	

=== Critical and public response ===
Film	Critical		Public	
Film	Rotten Tomatoes	Metacritic	CinemaScore	PostTrak
Jumanji	55% (51 reviews)	41 (19 reviews)	A−	—N/a
Zathura: A Space Adventure	77% (159 reviews)	67 (30 reviews)	B+	—N/a
Jumanji: Welcome to the Jungle	77% (235 reviews)	58 (44 reviews)	A−	84%
Jumanji: The Next Level	72% (249 reviews)	58 (37 reviews)	A−	—N/a

== Music ==
Soundtracks to Jumanji films
Title	U.S. release date	Length	Composer(s)	Label
Jumanji: Original Motion Picture Soundtrack	November 21, 1995	51:04	James Horner	Epic Soundtrax
Zathura: A Space Adventure (Original Motion Picture Soundtrack)	November 22, 2005	44:16	John Debney	Varèse Sarabande
Jumanji: Welcome to the Jungle (Original Motion Picture Soundtrack)	December 15, 2017	60:00	Henry Jackman	Sony Masterworks
Jumanji: The Next Level (Original Motion Picture Soundtrack)	December 6, 2019	61:27	Henry Jackman	Sony Classical

== Video games ==
Jumanji: A Jungle Adventure Game Pack (1996)
Jumanji: A Jungle Adventure is a video game released exclusively in North America for Microsoft Windows on October 9, 1996. It was developed by Studio Interactive and published by Philips Interactive Media. It contains five different action-arcade-based minigames that are based on popular scenes from the film.

Zathura (2005)
Zathura is an action-adventure video game developed by High Voltage Software and published by 2K Games. It was released on November 3, 2005, for PlayStation 2 and Xbox.

Jumanji (2006)
Jumanji is a party video game released exclusively in Europe for the PlayStation 2 on 2006, developed by Atomic Planet Entertainment and published by Blast! Entertainment.

Jumanji (2007)
Fujishoji released a Pachinko game in 2007, using clips from the film and also 3D rendered CGI anime character designs for the game as part of the screen interaction.

Jumanji: The Mobile Game (2017)
Jumanji: The Mobile Game was a mobile game based on the 2017 film Jumanji: Welcome to the Jungle developed by Idiocracy Games and published by NHN Entertainment, and released for Android and iOS on December 14, 2017. The game was removed from Google Play and App Store on May 2, 2018, and became unplayable on May 24.

Jumanji: The VR Adventure (2018)
Jumanji: The VR Adventure was a virtual reality experience based on the 2017 film Jumanji: Welcome to the Jungle. Developed by MWM Immersive and published by Sony Pictures Virtual Reality, it was released on Steam for HTC Vive on January 17, 2018. Although it was announced that the experience would be released on Oculus Rift and PlayStation VR, the releases were canceled, as the game was heavily criticized for its poor graphics and hardware performance. It was delisted from Steam on February 9, 2018.

Jumanji: The Video Game (2019)
Jumanji: The Video Game is an action-adventure video game developed by Funsolve and published by Outright Games. Based on Jumanji: Welcome to the Jungle and Jumanji: The Next Level, it was released on November 8, 2019, for PlayStation 4, Xbox One, Nintendo Switch, and Microsoft Windows. It was later released for PlayStation 5 on October 22, 2021.

Jumanji: Wild Adventures (2023)
Jumanji: Wild Adventures is an action-adventure video game developed by Cradle Games and published by Outright Games. It was released on November 3, 2023, for PlayStation 5, Nintendo Switch, PlayStation 4, Xbox One, Microsoft Windows, Xbox Series X, and Series S.
