= Alan Parrish (disambiguation) =

Alan Parrish is a character in the 1995 film Jumanji.

== See also ==
- Allen Parish, Louisiana
