= Rhys Darby =

New Zealand actor and comedian (born 1974)

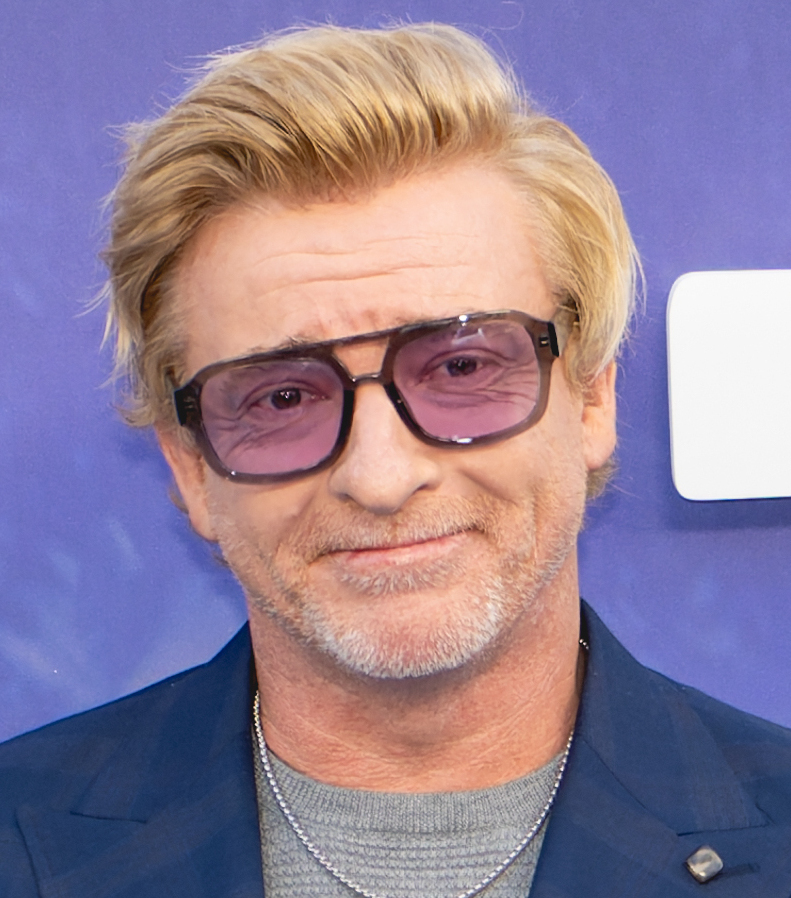
- Darby at the 2024 BFI London Film Festival premiere of That Christmas
- Born: Rhys Montague Darby; 21 March 1974 (age 52); Auckland, New Zealand
- Occupations: Actor; comedian
- Years active: 1996–present
- Spouse: Rosie Carnahan (m. 2004)
- Children: 2
- Website: rhysdarby.com

Rhys Montague Darby (born 21 March 1974) is a New Zealand actor and comedian. He is known for his energetic physical comedy routines, telling stories accompanied with mime and sound effects, for example machinery and animals. He was nominated for the Billy T Award in 2001 and 2002; he won the 2012 Fred (Dagg) Award for best NZ show at the New Zealand International Comedy Festival.

Darby is best known for playing Murray Hewitt, the band manager of Flight of the Conchords in the television series, a role he originally played in the BBC radio series under the name Brian Nesbit. He has appeared in films including Yes Man (2008), The Boat That Rocked (2009), Love Birds (2011), What We Do in the Shadows (2014), Trolls (2016), Jumanji: Welcome to the Jungle (2017), Guns Akimbo (2019), Relax, I'm from the Future (2022), Uproar (2023), and Next Goal Wins (2023). From March 2022 to October 2023, he starred as Stede Bonnet alongside Taika Waititi in the HBO Max period romantic comedy series Our Flag Means Death.

== Early life ==
Darby was born on 21 March 1974 in Auckland and grew up in the eastern Auckland suburb of Pakuranga. He attended Edgewater College in Auckland. A former soldier, he left the New Zealand Army in 1994 and began studies at the University of Canterbury in Christchurch, New Zealand. In 1996 he formed a comedy duo, Rhysently Granted, with Grant Lobban. After winning an open mic contest at Southern Blues Bar in Christchurch, the duo began performing at local venues.

== Career ==
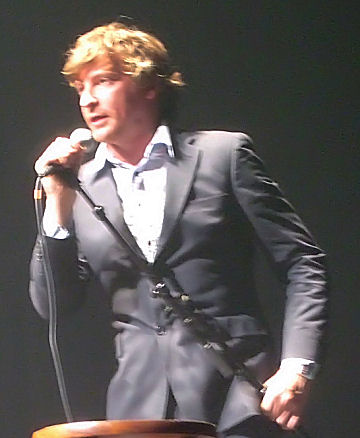
Darby at Gramercy in June 2007

Rhys appeared in "Night Groovers" – 3rd collection of rADz – (radical art Haiku films by Yeti Productions) in 2000. Rhysently Granted performed at two international comedy festivals which led to Darby moving back to Auckland to seek more solo stand-up experience. After performing his first solo show at the 2002 Edinburgh Festival Fringe, Darby moved to the UK to pursue his career.

In 2004, he appeared in the Flight of the Conchords BBC radio series as the band's manager Brian Nesbit alongside comedy stars such as Rob Brydon, Andy Parsons and Jimmy Carr. Darby's character was renamed to Murray Hewitt, the band's manager, for the Flight of the Conchords TV show. He provided vocals for the track "Leggy Blonde" on their self-titled first album and also in the second series of the show on the track "Rejected" during the episode "A Good Opportunity" alongside tenor Andrew Drost.

Darby played the role of Norman, the boss of Jim Carrey's character in Yes Man. In July 2008 he appeared in a Nike advertisement featuring Roger Federer; he played an impostor posing as Federer's coach. Darby appeared on a British children's television programme The Slammer during its first series. He appeared on Soccer AM on 18 October 2008 and on Never Mind The Buzzcocks on 23 October.

Darby performed his stand-up show It's Rhys Darby Night at the Edinburgh Festival Fringe on 6–15 August 2009, at the Bloomsbury Theatre in London from 27 July to 1 August, and toured New Zealand in October and November in 2009. He played the role of Angus in the Richard Curtis film The Boat That Rocked released in the UK on 1 April 2009. This film was released in some countries in November 2009 under the name Pirate Radio.

In 2009, while home in New Zealand, he began filming TV ads for NZ's new mobile network, 2degrees, and appeared in shows: Rocked the Nation 2, Jaquie Brown Diaries and Intrepid Journeys. He branched out into producing live comedy with his wife and their company, Awesomeness International. At the NZ International Comedy Festival they produced shows for local comedians. Darby became a climate ambassador for Greenpeace in its Sign On climate campaign. He published a poem and video in support of the campaign. In 2009 Darby became a part of the New Zealand TV ONE series Intrepid Journeys, Season 5, touring Rwanda. On 10 August 2010, Entertainment Weekly claimed that Darby was in consideration for a role on The Office on NBC after Steve Carell left at the end of the 2011 season; however, it did not materialise.

In May 2011, he also filmed a pilot for a Channel 4 sitcom in the UK, The Fun Police. The pilot was broadcast on 16 September. In 2011, Darby and family moved to the US for Darby to take a role in the CBS sitcom How to Be a Gentleman. Darby's second DVD It's Rhys Darby Night! was released in NZ on 12 December 2011. He wrote a self-described "autobiographical space novel" entitled This Way to Spaceship, which was released on 12 April 2012. On 20 May 2012, Darby was awarded the Fred Award by the New Zealand International Comedy Festival for his show of the same name as his book.

In 2013, he was responsible for flying 'Cornish rappers' Hedluv + Passman to New Zealand for the New Zealand International Comedy Festival. This was followed by an appearance on Seven Sharp, where he introduced 'his rappers' to the New Zealand public. From 2013 to 2025, Darby co-hosted the cryptozoology-focused podcast The Cryptid Factor with Dan Schreiber, David Farrier and Leon 'Buttons' Kirkbeck. The podcast recorded its final episode at the Edinburgh Fringe Festival in August 2025.

Darby summited Mount Kilimanjaro in July 2013 as part of a World Vision team of celebrities that included Olympian Mahé Drysdale and musician Boh Runga. On 8 November 2013, Darby made an appearance and performed some standup comedy in his capacity as second guest on the Late Show with David Letterman. He portrayed Anton in the 2014 release comedy horror film What We Do in the Shadows.

In February 2016, he played Guy Mann in the third episode ("Mulder and Scully Meet the Were-Monster") of season 10 of The X-Files. Darby, a long-time fan of the show, was thrilled by his experience on set. He saw this as an opportunity that only comes around every so often and said he'd return to the set the first chance he received. In 2018, Darby participated in a video together with Prime Minister of New Zealand Jacinda Ardern as part of a tourism campaign for the country in which they discussed why New Zealand was being excluded from world maps so frequently.

Darby played the role of Nigel Billingsley in the 2017 film Jumanji: Welcome to the Jungle, and the 2019 sequel Jumanji: The Next Level. In 2025, it was announced that Darby would be reprising his role in the newest Jumanji installment. From 2022 to 2023, Darby starred in the HBO Max series Our Flag Means Death as pirate captain Stede Bonnet. The series received critical acclaim for its LGBTQ representation, in part due to the romantic relationship between Bonnet and Blackbeard, played by co-star Taika Waititi. Critics also praised Darby’s portrayal of Bonnet, calling it his “career-best” work and one of the best TV performances of 2022. His performance earned several award nominations, including Peabody, Hollywood Critics Association and Astra Award nods. Darby has referred to Our Flag Means Death as “the best thing I’ve ever done” and his favourite TV project, along with calling the role of Bonnet the most “challenging” and “complex” role of his career.

Darby was tapped to host the 51st International Emmy Awards in November 2023. He later presented at the 75th Creative Arts Emmy Awards in January 2024 and the Art Directors Guild Awards in February 2024. In June 2024, Darby starred as the Interim Deputy Director of “Turalism” in a series of promotional videos for the fifth expansion of "Final Fantasy XIV", Dawntrail, taking the form of a tourism advertisement for the expansion's central setting, the continent of Tural. In November 2024, Darby announced he would be returning to stand-up comedy after nearly a decade long hiatus with a new show called The Legend Returns. The show toured throughout New Zealand, Australia, the UK and Ireland from May to August 2025. The show is set to debut in America in May 2026 as part of the Netflix Is A Joke comedy festival.

== Personal life ==
Darby is the youngest of five children and grew up with a single mother. He was particularly close with his sister Linda, who helped mother him after their father left.

He met Rosie Carnahan while performing stand-up comedy at her café in Christchurch. She became his manager, they married in 2004, and they have two sons. As of July 2014, Darby and his family live in Los Angeles. Darby says that he is on the autistic spectrum and has ADHD.

== Filmography ==
=== Film ===
Year	Title	Role	Note
2008	Yes Man	Norman "Norm" Stokes	
2009	The Boat That Rocked	Angus Nutsford	Also known as Pirate Radio in North America
2009	Diagnosis: Death	Specialist	
2009	Peacock Season	Galtrex Guy	
2011	Coming & Going	Lee Leonetti	
2011	Love Birds	Doug	
2011	Arthur Christmas	Lead Elf (voice)	
2014	What We Do in the Shadows	Anton	
2016	Hunt for the Wilderpeople	Psycho Sam	
2016	Trolls	Bibbly (voice)	
2017	Killing Hasselhoff	Fish	
2017	Jumanji: Welcome to the Jungle	Nigel Billingsley	
2019	Guns Akimbo	Glenjamin	
2019	Mosley	Deaver (voice)	
2019	Teen Titans Go! vs. Teen Titans	The Master of Games (voice)	
2019	Jumanji: The Next Level	Nigel Billingsley	
2020	100% Wolf	Foxwell Cripp (voice)	
2022	Rise of the Teenage Mutant Ninja Turtles: The Movie	Hypno-Potamus (voice)	
2022	Relax, I'm from the Future	Casper	
2023	Next Goal Wins	Rhys Marlin	
2023	Uproar	Madigan	
2024	That Christmas	Mr. McNutt (voice)	
2025	Love Hurts	Kippy Betts	
2025	Little Lorraine	Tim	
2025	The Lost Tiger	Plato (voice)	
2026	The Sheep Detectives	Wool-Eyes (voice)	
2026	Jumanji: Open World	Nigel Billingsley	Post-production
2027	CoComelon: The Movie	Lefty (voice)	Post-production
2027	Gatto	Focaccia (voice)	Post-production

=== Television ===
Years	Title	Role	Notes
2005	Who's Ya Mate?	Multiple	Television film
2007–2009	Flight of the Conchords	Murray Hewitt	22 episodes
2009	The Jaquie Brown Diaries	Terence Ben'et	1 episode
2009	Comedy Showcase: The Amazing Dermot	Dermot Flint	
2010	Radiradirah	Gavin Hoode, First Officer Rangi	3 episodes
2011	How to Be a Gentleman	Mike	9 episodes
2011	Comedy Showcase: The Fun Police	Leslie	
2012	Missing Christmas	Dennis Gob	Television film
2012	Jake and the Never Land Pirates	Percy	
2012	Life Stinks	Connor	Miniseries
2012	The Skinner Boys: Live at Mingara NSW	Professor Tinkerpuff	Television stage show
2013	How I Met Your Mother	Hamish	Episode: "No Questions Asked"
2013	Watsky's Releasing an Album	Flynn	3 episodes
2013	The Aquabats! Super Show!	The Shark Fighter	
2013	Tiny Commando	Tony Turk (voice)	2 episodes
2013	Keep Calm and Karey On		Television film
2014	Legit	Trevor	1 episode
2014	Short Poppies	Various characters	
2014	Modern Family	Fergus Anderson	Episode: "Australia"
2014	Comedy Bang! Bang!	Uncle Deckard	1 episode
2014	Hot in Cleveland	Jack	3 episodes
2014	The Millers	Martin	Episode: "CON-Troversy"
2014	It's a Date	Craig	1 episode
2015–2016	Thunderbirds Are Go	Langstrom Fischler	Voice, 3 episodes
2015	Life in Pieces	Teddy	2 episodes
2016	The X-Files	Guy Mann	Episode: "Mulder and Scully Meet the Were-Monster"
2016	The Barefoot Bandits	Dennis Gobb, Billy Bob Gobb	Voice
2016–2019	Mike Tyson Mysteries	Terry	Voice, 2 episodes
2016–2018	Wrecked	Steve	Regular
2016–2018	Voltron: Legendary Defender	Coran	Voice, 27 episodes
2017	A Series of Unfortunate Events	Charles	2 episodes
2017	Fresh Off the Boat	Tony Wonder	Episode: "Living While Eddie"
2017	Dr. Ken	Charles Evans	Episode: "Ken and the CEO"
2017	The Lion Guard	Mwenzi	Voice, episode: "Ono the Tickbird"
2017	Bajillion Dollar Propertie$	Stevahn Rabren	Episode: "Dean's Legacy"
2017	Milo Murphy's Law	King Pistashion	Voice, episode: "Missing Milo"
2017	We Bare Bears	Kyle	Voice, episode: "Kyle"
2017	The Jim Jefferies Show	Jacko	Episode: "America's Opioid Epidemic"
2017	Welcome to the Wayne	Isthotep	Voice, episode: "Flutch"
2017–2023	Bob's Burgers	Duncan / Quincy Cox	Voice, 3 episodes
2018	Rise of the Teenage Mutant Ninja Turtles	Hypno-Potamus / Mezmer-Ron	Voice, recurring role
2018	Skylanders Academy	Crash Bandicoot	Voice, 2 episodes (Season 3)
2018	The Simpsons	Tag Tuckerbag	Voice, episode: "Heartbreak Hotel"
2018	The Venture Bros	H.E.L.P.eR. Model Two	Voice, episode: "The Inamorata Consequence"
2018–2019	Star vs. the Forces of Evil	Eddie	Voice, 5 episodes
2019–2020	Infinity Train	Randall	Voice, 4 episodes
2019–2020	Carmen Sandiego	Neal the Eel	Voice, 2 episodes
2020	Big City Greens	Life Guard	Voice, episode: "Shark Objects"
2020	Moominvalley	Mysterious Fisherman	Voice, 3 episodes
2020	The Big Fib	C.L.I.V.E.	30 episodes
2020	The Boss Baby: Back in Business	Happy Sedengry	Voice, 3 episodes
2020	Wild Life	Sam	Voice, 1 episode
2020–2022	Pete the Cat	Joey Laroux	9 episodes
2021	Wellington Paranormal	Anton-Park Ranger	Episode: "Te Maero"
2021	The Great North	Denny the Snowflake	Voice, episode: "Game of Snownes"
2021	Sweet Tooth	Hazmat #2	Episode: "Big Man"
2022	Pacific Rim: The Black	Bunyip Man	Voice, episode: "The Never Never"
2022	Home Economics	Monroe Davies	Episode: "Book Deal, Terms Negotiable"
2022	Action Pack	Mr. Villainman	2 episodes
2022–2023	Our Flag Means Death	Stede Bonnet	Main role, 18 episodes
2023	SpongeBob SquarePants	Krabby Patty (voice)	Episode: "My Friend Patty"
2023	Kiff	Trollie (voice)	2 episodes
2023	Curses!	Stanley (voice)	Main role
2024	Night Court	Alistair Tully, The Duke of Greybog	Season 2 Episode 12: "The Duke's a Hazard"
2024	Monsters at Work	Roger Rogers (voice)	9 episodes
2024	The Hungry Games: Alaska Big Bear Challenge	Narrator (voice)	3 episodes
2024	Royal Crackers	Johnathan (voice)	Episode: "Dog"
2024–2026	Chibiverse	Perry the Platypus (voice)	3 episodes
2025	The Z-Suite	Bennett Buffy	4 episodes
2025	Love, Death & Robots	Father Maguire	Episode: "Golgotha"
2025	Phineas and Ferb	Lamond	Voice, episode: "Space Adventure"
2025	My Life Is Murder	Byron	Episode: "Thirteen O'Clock"
2025–2026	Star Trek: Strange New Worlds	Trelane	2 episodes
2026	Adventure Time: Side Quests	Jonas / Doctor (voice)	Episode: "All You Can Eat"
2026	Regular Show: The Lost Tapes	Toby Tilapia (voice)	Episode: "Smoke Alarm on the Water"

=== Television appearances as himself ===
Year	Title
2001–2002	Billy T Award
2005	Mighty Truck of Stuff
2006	The Slammer
2007–2008	Sounds Like a Laugh
2008	Yo Gabba Gabba!
2008	The Comedy Store Live
2009	Rocked the Nation 2: 100 NZ Pop Culture Moments
2009	Spicks and Specks
2009	Thank God You're Here
2009	ROVE
2009	Intrepid Journeys
2009–2012	7 Days
2010	The Qantas TV and Film Awards
2011	A Quiet Word With ...
2011	The Rob Brydon Show
2012	Mad Mad World
2012	Sunday Brunch
2012	The Comedy Marathon Spectacular
2012	QI
2013–2017	@midnight
2013	Late Show with David Letterman
2014	No, You Shut Up!
2016	The Café
2016–2017	Whose Line is it Anyway? Australia
2018	Drunk History Australia
2020	Rhys Darby: Big in Japan
2021	The Masked Singer NZ
2021	Patriot Brains
2022	Late Night with Seth Meyers
2022	Celebrity Family Feud
2024	After Midnight
2024	Expedition X
2025	Richard Osman's House of Games

=== Comedy specials ===
- Imagine That! (2008)
- It's Rhys Darby Night! (2011)
- This Way to Spaceship (2012)
- I'm a Fighter Jet (2017)
- Mystic Time Bird (2021)

=== Video games ===
Year	Title	Voice role
2017	Voltron VR Chronicles	Coran
2018	Dr. Grordbort's Invaders	Gimble
2019	Jumanji: The Video Game	Nigel Billingsley
2020	Half-Life: Alyx	Russell
2020	Fortnite	Chapter 2 (Season 3 Battle Pass voiceover)
2021	Star Wars: Tales from the Galaxy's Edge - Last Call	Deek/IG-88
2023	Jumanji: Wild Adventures	Nigel Billingsley

== Accolades, awards, and nominations ==
Year	Award	Category	Nominated Work	Result	Ref.
2001	Billy T Award	Kiwi Comedian with "Outstanding Potential"	Himself	Nominated	
2002	Billy T Award	Kiwi Comedian with "Outstanding Potential"	Himself	Nominated	
2008	Online Film & Television Association	Best Supporting Actor in a Comedy Series	Flight of The Conchords	Nominated	
2008	International Online Cinema Awards (INOCA)	Best Supporting Actor in a Comedy Series	Flight of the Conchords	Won	
2012	Fred Award	Best New Zealand Show	This Way to Spaceship	Won	
2022
2022	Gold Derby TV Awards	Best Comedy Actor	Our Flag Means Death	Nominated	
2022	Blood in the Snow Film Festival Jury Prize	Best Lead Performance	Relax, I'm from the Future	Nominated	
2022	Tell-Tale TV Awards	Favorite Performer in a Cable or Streaming Comedy Series	Our Flag Means Death	Won	
2022	Hollywood Critics Association Television Awards	Best Actor in a Streaming Series, Comedy	Our Flag Means Death	Nominated	
2023	Peabody Awards	Entertainment	Our Flag Means Death	Nominated	
2024
2024	Tell-Tale TV Awards	Favorite Performer in a Cable or Streaming Comedy Series	Our Flag Means Death	Won	
2024	Gold Derby TV Awards	Best Comedy Actor	Our Flag Means Death	Nominated	
2024	Astra Awards	Best Actor in a Streaming Comedy Series	Our Flag Means Death	Nominated	
