= Karen Gillan =

Scottish actress and filmmaker (born 1987)

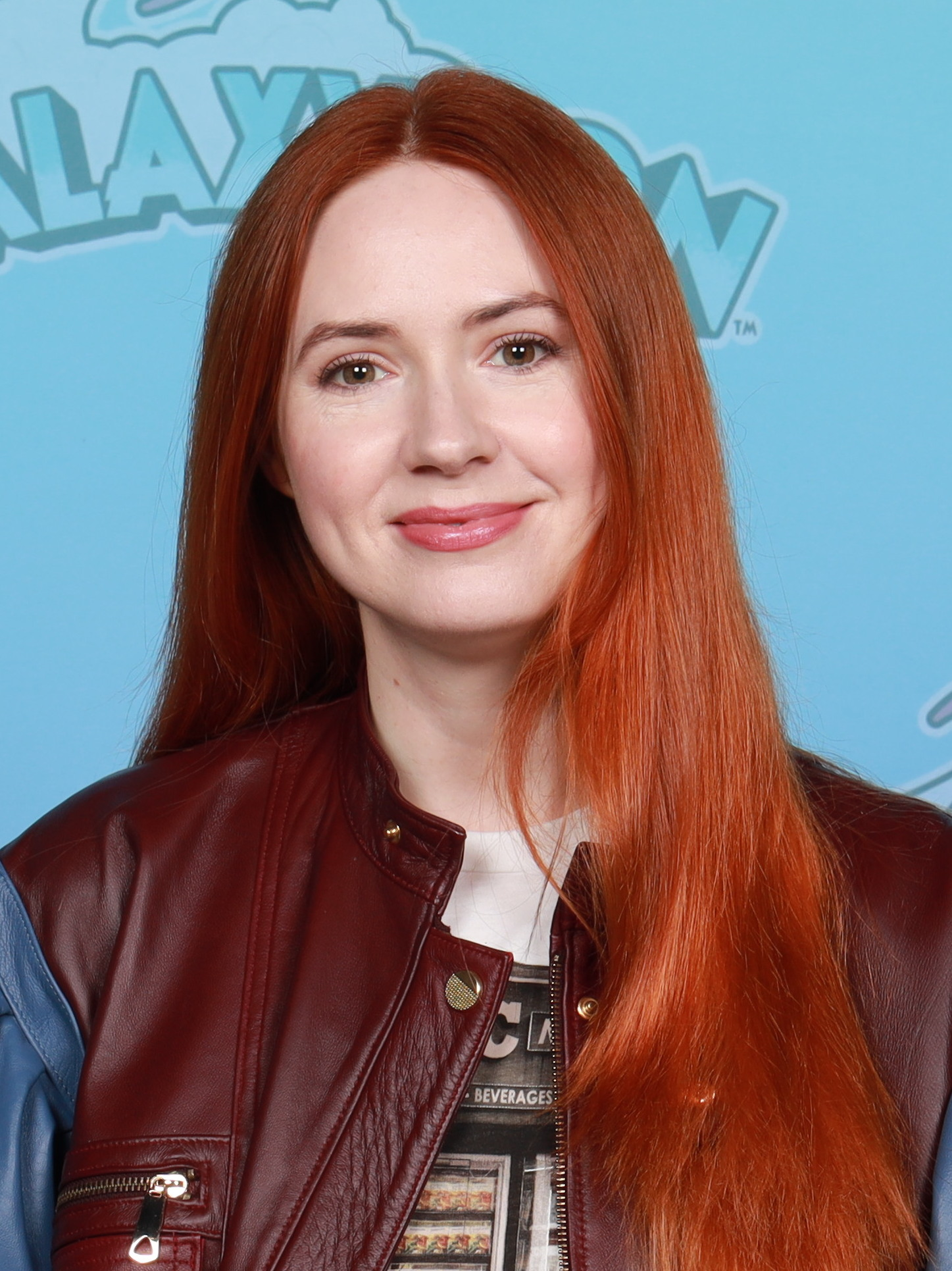
- Gillan at the September 2025 GalaxyCon Des Moines
- Born: 28 November 1987 (age 38); Inverness, Scotland
- Occupations: Actress; filmmaker
- Years active: 2006–present
- Works: Full list
- Spouse: Nick Kocher (m. 2022)
- Children: 1
- Parents: Raymond Gillan (father); Marie née Paterson (mother)
- Relatives: Caitlin Blackwood (cousin)

Karen Sheila Gillan (/ˈɡɪlən/; born 28 November 1987) is a Scottish actress and filmmaker. She gained recognition for her work in British film and television, particularly for portraying Amy Pond, a primary companion to the Eleventh Doctor in the science fiction series Doctor Who (2010–2013). Her early film roles include the thriller Outcast (2010) and the romantic comedy Not Another Happy Ending (2013). She worked on the British stage, appearing in John Osborne's play Inadmissible Evidence (2011).

Gillan made her Hollywood debut in 2013, starring in the horror film Oculus, then played the lead in the ABC rom-com sitcom Selfie (2014). She achieved stardom for portraying Nebula in several films of the Marvel Cinematic Universe (2014–2023), which are among the highest-grossing films of all time, and Ruby Roundhouse in the fantasy films Jumanji: Welcome to the Jungle (2017), Jumanji: The Next Level (2019), and Jumanji: Open World (2026). She also wrote and directed the drama film The Party's Just Beginning (2018), which she also starred in.

In the 2020s, Gillan has starred in the action thriller film Gunpowder Milkshake (2021), the thriller film Dual (2022), the coming-of-age film Late Bloomers (2023), the fantasy drama film The Life of Chuck (2024), and returned to British television with the series Douglas Is Cancelled (2024).

== Early life ==
Karen Sheila Gillan was born in Inverness on 28 November 1987, the daughter of Marie (née Paterson) and Raymond Gillan. Her father is from Sunderland in North East England, and performs music under the name John Gillan. Although she comes from a Catholic background, she says that she was not baptised and does not practise a religion. She took piano lessons as a child.

When Gillan turned 16, she moved to Edinburgh and completed an HNC Acting and Performance course at Telford College. She moved to London at age 18 to study at the Italia Conti Academy of Theatre Arts. While there, she was scouted by a modelling agency. Before her acting career, she worked as a model, premiering at London Fashion Week in 2007. Gillan has said she enjoyed modelling but preferred acting.

== Career ==
=== 2006–2012: British film and television ===
Gillan's early television acting career included guest appearances on several television shows, with her first role being in an episode of ITV crime drama Rebus, a role for which she had to drop out of school.

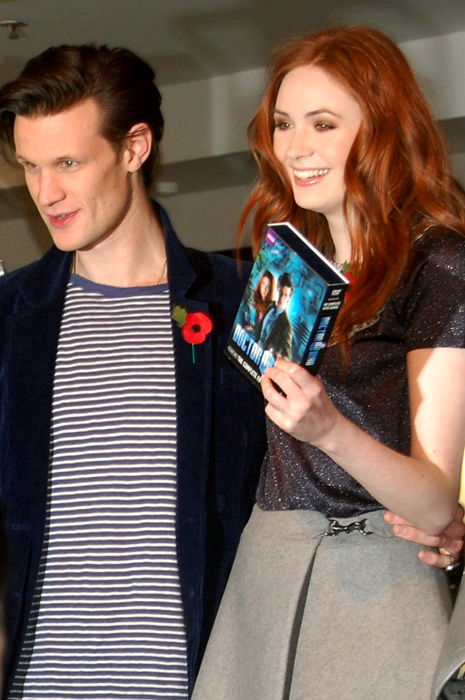
Gillan with Doctor Who co-star Matt Smith in November 2010

Gillan undertook a two-year stint as a member of the ensemble cast of the sketch comedy series The Kevin Bishop Show, in which she played multiple characters including celebrities such as Cheryl Cole, Katy Perry and Angelina Jolie. Karen Gillan also appeared on TV in a leading role in a horror project entitled The Well, which was broadcast as a series of episodic short films on BBC Two and later as a web series on BBC.co.uk. Part of the BBC's multimedia "switch" programming, the short episodes interconnect with online games that further explore the environments presented in the series. In 2008, she starred in the Channel 4 television film Stacked.

Gillan went on to portray Amy Pond, companion to the Eleventh Doctor (portrayed by Matt Smith), on the British sci-fi series Doctor Who. Before being cast in the role in May 2009, she had previously appeared on Doctor Who in Series 4 episode "The Fires of Pompeii" in the role of a soothsayer. She made her first on-screen appearance as Amy in "The Eleventh Hour" with her cousin Caitlin Blackwood portraying a younger version of the same character. In 2010, she won in the Entertainment category at the Young Scot Awards. She appeared in the sixth series in 2011 and the first five episodes of the seventh series in 2012, after which her character and Rory Williams (portrayed by Arthur Darvill) left the series. Karen Gillan reprised her role in the 2013 Christmas special "The Time of the Doctor", to coincide with Smith's departure as the Doctor.

In 2011, Gillan made her first theatre appearance playing the role of Shirley in John Osborne's play Inadmissible Evidence along with Douglas Hodge. The play debuted at the Donmar Warehouse on 16 October 2011. After making an appearance in Outcast, it was announced that Karen Gillan would star in an indie Scottish romantic comedy called Not Another Happy Ending alongside Emun Elliott in August 2011. She was selected by director John McKay because he came to know her during the production of We'll Take Manhattan, which he also directed, as "a very bubbly, vibrant, energetic, funny, slightly clumsy person" who was a perfect fit for the character. Filming took place in July 2012, though Elliott was replaced by Stanley Weber. Karen Gillan told journalists that she was happy to be involved in a Scottish production that "isn't about drug use or fighting the English". The film premiered at the Edinburgh International Film Festival in June 2013.

In 2012, Gillan appeared in the television film We'll Take Manhattan playing the part of supermodel Jean Shrimpton, which told the story of Shrimpton's relationship with the photographer David Bailey.

=== 2013–2019: Hollywood breakthrough ===
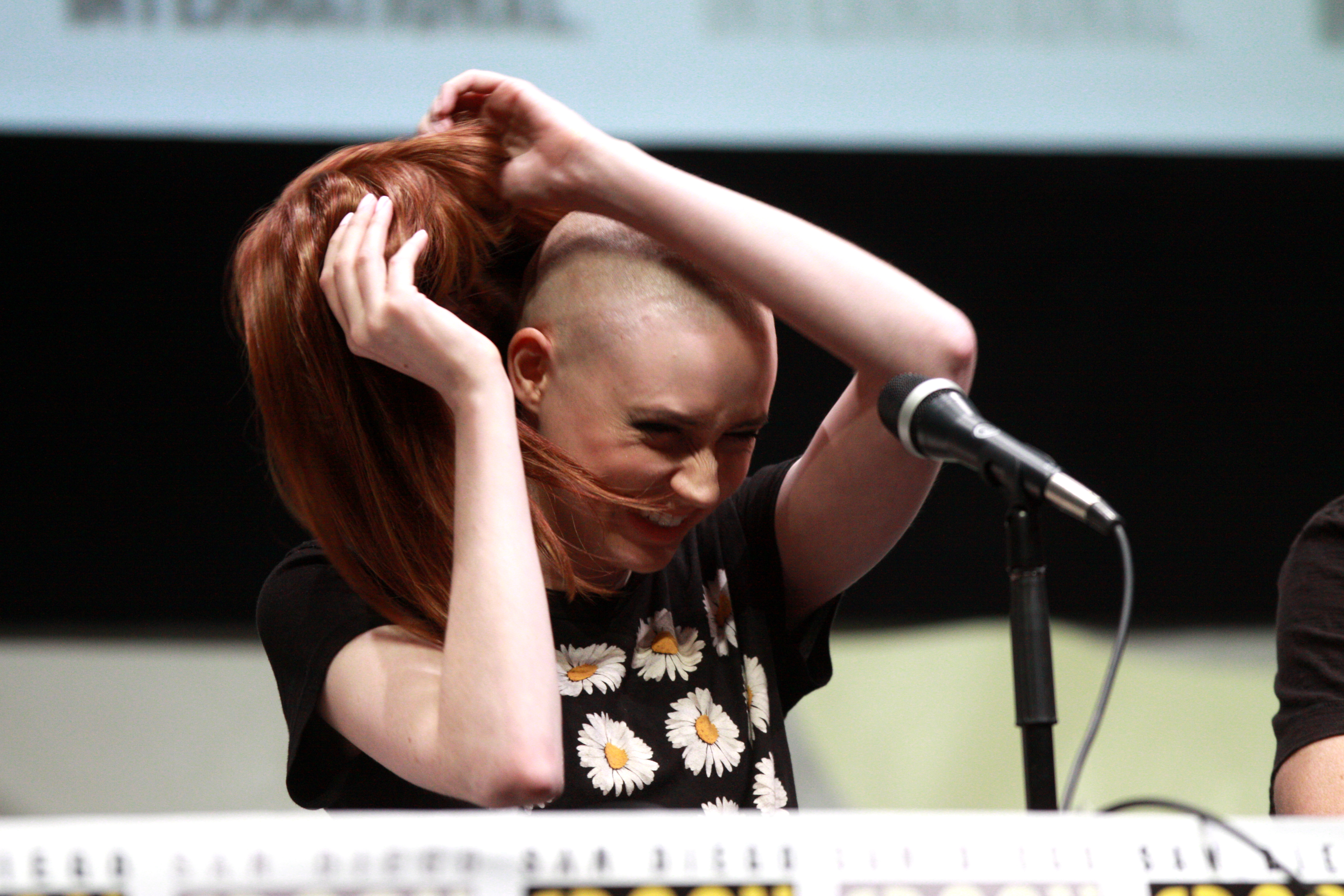
Gillan at San Diego Comic-Con promoting Guardians of the Galaxy in 2013. For her breakthrough role of Nebula, she shaved her head.

In November 2013, Gillan appeared on Broadway in a play called Time to Act, one of the plays included in "The 24 Hour Plays on Broadway" to benefit the non-profit Urban Arts Partnership. She was also cast in the third season of A Touch of Cloth, which was co-created by Charlie Brooker. Gillan joined the regular cast of Adult Swim's NTSF:SD:SUV:: for the show's third season in 2013. She moved to the United States in 2013 and landed her first leading Hollywood role in the supernatural horror movie Oculus. It was filmed in Alabama and premiered at the 2013 Toronto International Film Festival to critical success. Brian Tallerico writing for RogerEbert.com believed the film was effective "thanks largely to a game performance from Gillan. She renders Kaylie as a driven woman on the edge of sanity herself." She earned a Fright Meter Award nomination for Best Actress.

In February 2014, Gillan was cast as the lead in Selfie, an American single-camera sitcom for ABC produced by Warner Bros. Television which was greenlit for the 2014–2015 US television season. Gillan played a socialite named Eliza Dooley, a modern-day take on Eliza Doolittle, who is obsessed with social media. This was Gillan's first time in the lead role of an American television series. The series was cancelled by ABC on 7 November 2014 after seven episodes; the remaining six episodes were made available on Hulu starting 25 November 2014. Selfie still has a dedicated following of fans years after its broadcast especially in China, where there is still a large demand for a sequel. Initially, there were talks of a Selfie movie revival with Stars Collective in 2023. The company shares the same CEO as Starlight Media, a Beverly Hills-based subsidiary of Starlight Culture Entertainment Group, which was one of the investors for the film Crazy Rich Asians. However, no further developments were made since Warner Brothers declined to release the film rights. In May 2013, Karen Gillan was cast as Nebula in the Marvel superhero science fiction film Guardians of the Galaxy, which was released in August 2014.Gillan shaved her head bald for the role; Marvel subsequently used her shaved hair to manufacture a custom wig, which she wore during the production of the television series Selfie. In May 2014, Karen Gillan was cast in the Western film In a Valley of Violence directed by Ti West, opposite John Travolta, Ethan Hawke and Taissa Farmiga. Karen Gillan portrayed Ellen, the older sister to Farmiga's character. She also appeared in TV on the Radio's "Happy Idiot" music video, released on 3 October 2014.

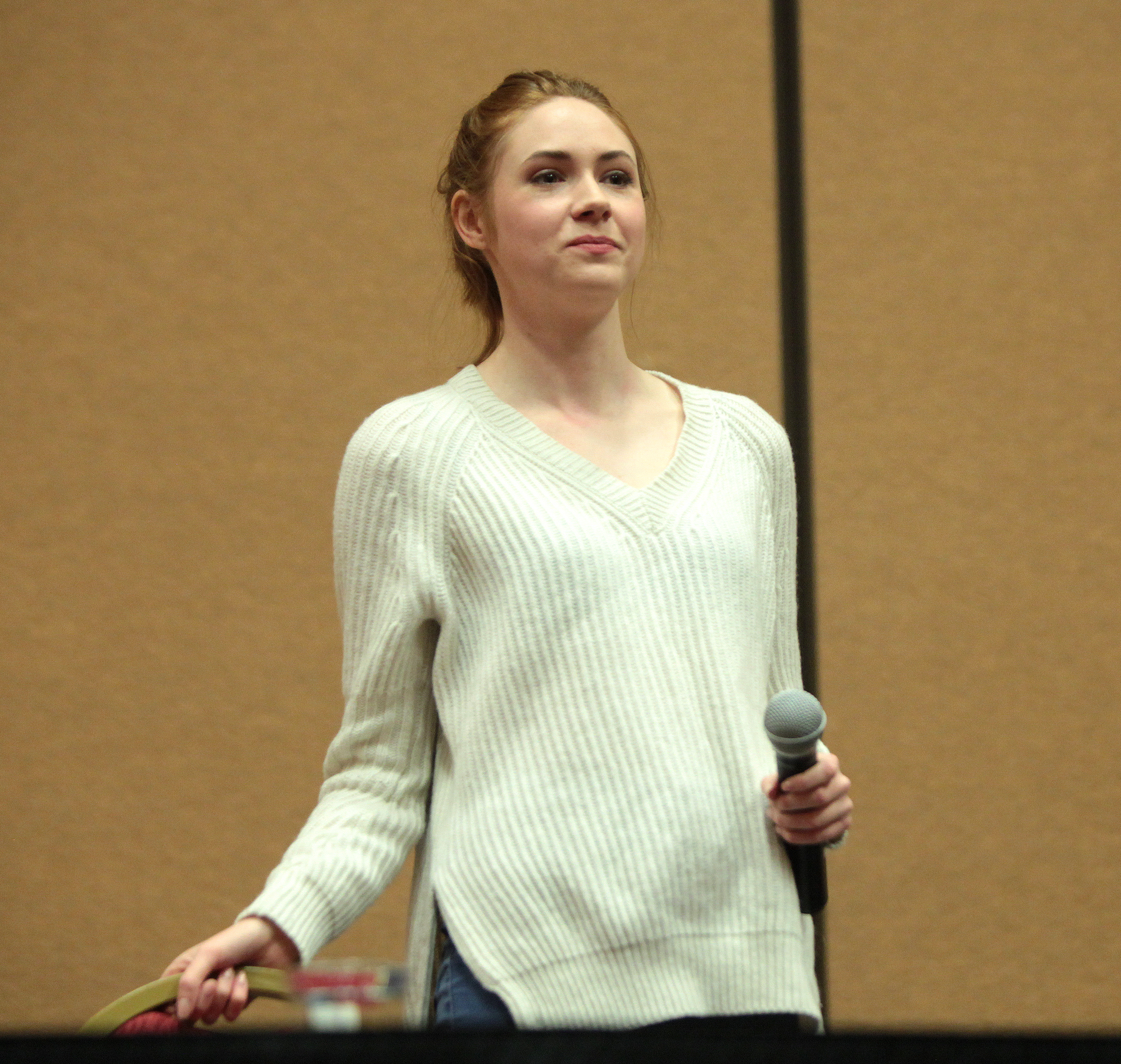
Gillan in December 2015

In 2015, Gillan had a bit part in the drama film The Big Short directed by Adam McKay, alongside Brad Pitt, Christian Bale, Ryan Gosling, Steve Carell and Melissa Leo. She wrote and directed her first short film, Coward, which screened at the 2015 Edinburgh Film Festival, and was nominated for several awards. Later in the year she wrote, directed, and starred in another short film called Conventional. She won in the Best Female Newcomer category at the 20th Empire Awards for Guardians of the Galaxy and Oculus. In the same year, she was cast in an HBO pilot titled The Devil You Know.

On 2 November 2016, it was announced that Gillan would write, direct and star in her directorial feature film debut with Burbank-based development and production company Mt. Hollywood Films' indie drama project titled Tupperware Party. Set in her home city of Inverness in the Scottish Highlands, filming began in January 2017 and wrapped in the following month. The title of the film was later changed to The Party's Just Beginning. The film was nominated for Best Feature Film at the British Academy Scotland Awards.

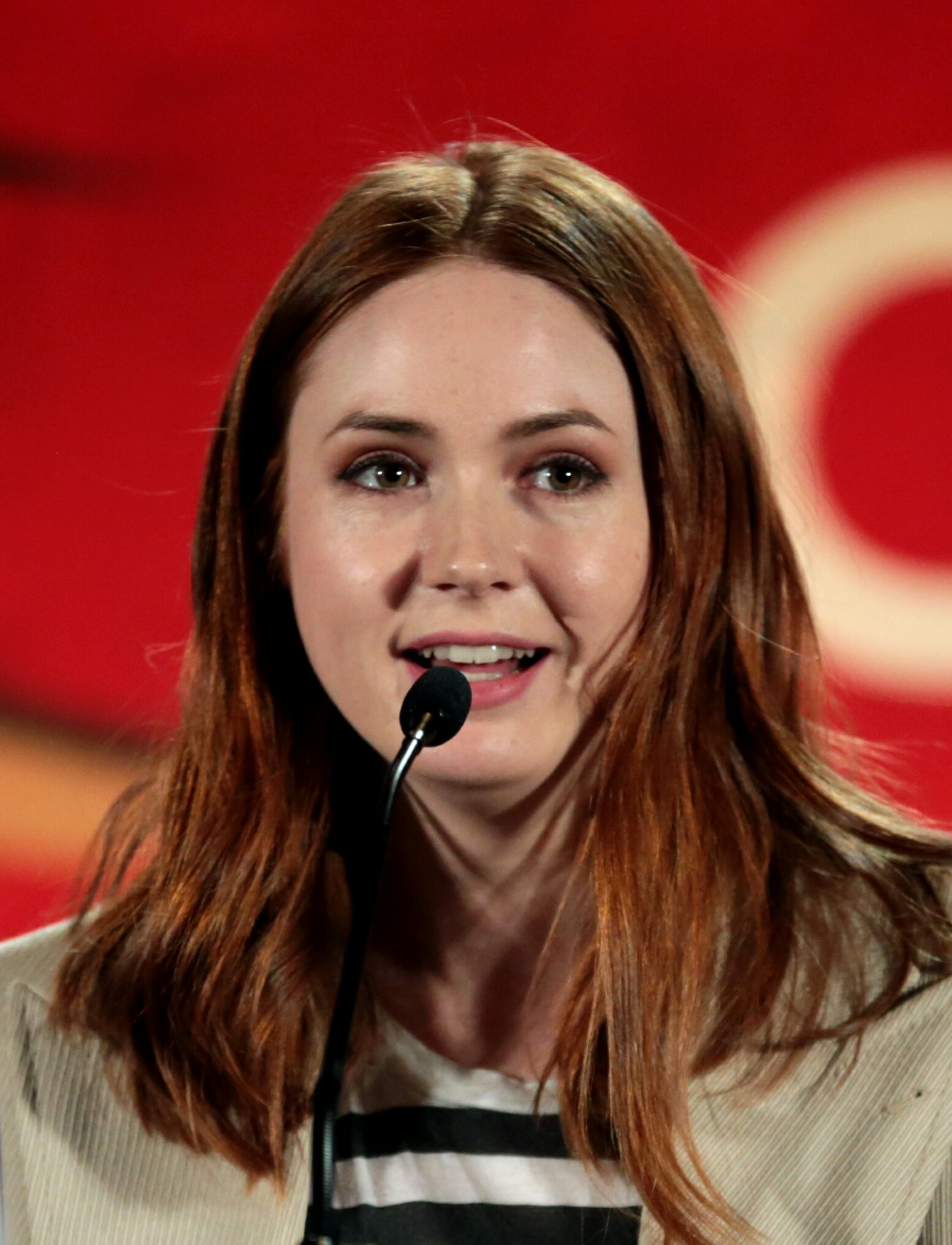
Gillan in 2017

In 2017, Gillan reprised her role as Nebula in Guardians of the Galaxy Vol. 2, this time becoming a member of the film's eponymous team, and co-starred in The Circle, alongside Emma Watson, Tom Hanks, and John Boyega. The latter film, released in April, was directed and written by James Ponsoldt, and was based on the novel by Dave Eggers. Also in that year, Karen Gillan played the lead female role, Ruby Roundhouse, in Jumanji: Welcome to the Jungle, the third instalment of the Jumanji franchise, starring alongside Dwayne Johnson, Kevin Hart, Jack Black and Nick Jonas. She reprised her role as Nebula in Avengers: Infinity War (2018) and Avengers: Endgame (2019), which were filmed back-to-back. Filming for the two films began in January 2017 at Pinewood Atlanta Studios in Fayette County, Georgia and ended in January 2018.

In 2019, aside from her leading role in Avengers: Endgame, she co-starred in the films Stuber and Spies in Disguise, and starred in All Creatures Here Below. Also in 2019, she reprised her role as Ruby Roundhouse in Jumanji: The Next Level and appeared in a short film titled Neurotica.

=== 2020–present: mainstream success ===
In 2020, Gillan appeared in the adventure drama The Call of the Wild, based on the Jack London novel. The following year, she starred in the action film Gunpowder Milkshake alongside Lena Headey, Angela Bassett, Carla Gugino, Michelle Yeoh and Paul Giamatti. For the role, she was nominated for Best Actress in an Action Movie at the 2nd Critics' Choice Super Awards.

In 2021, Disney Branded Television announced that Gillan would star on the upcoming Disney Television Animation and 20th Television Animation series Rhona Who Lives by the River as the titular character, Gillan would act as executive producer for the series alongside series creator Emily Kapnek and series composer Danny Elfman. Gillan previously worked with Kapnek on the sitcom series, Selfie (2014).

In 2022, she starred in the sci-fi thriller Dual alongside Aaron Paul, which is filmed entirely in Tampere, Finland. She played a double role, and earned acclaim for her performance. Critic consensus from review aggregator Rotten Tomatoes described the movie as "well-led", and John DeFore for The Hollywood Reporter said that "Karen Gillan, who has spent much of her post-Doctor Who decade playing cyborgs, computer avatars and a thinly imagined assassin, has a barely more human role to play here; to the extent that she makes either Sarah worth rooting for, it's an achievement." At the 3rd Critics' Choice Super Awards, she was nominated for Best Actress in a Science Fiction/Fantasy Movie.

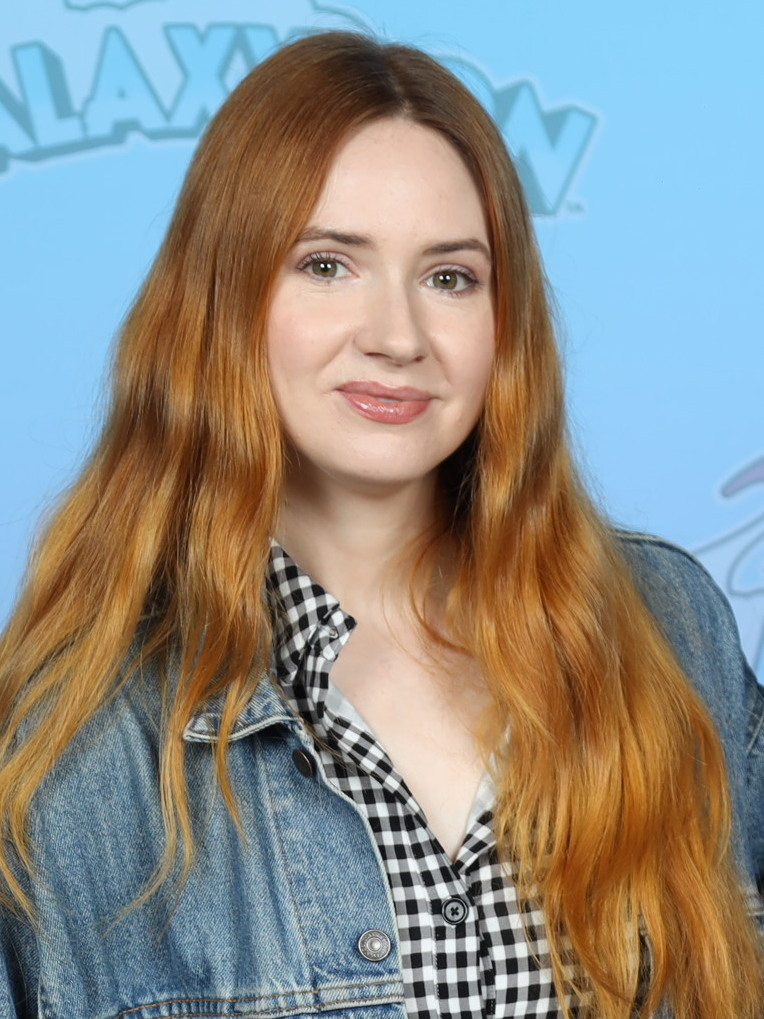
Gillan at GalaxyCon in September 2023

In 2023 she appeared in Late Bloomers, for which Damon Wise of Deadline Hollywood praised her "engaging and refreshingly vanity-free performance". Also in 2023, she began filming Sleeping Dogs in Australia with Russell Crowe which earned a 2024 release and received mixed reviews. Better received was the ITVX comedy drama series Douglas Is Cancelled, which was released in June 2024 and marked Gillan's return to British television. She was critically praised for her acting. Lucy Mangan of The Guardian said her "magnificent performance keeps all the possibilities in play." Nick Hilton of The Independent believed "Gillan is totally convincing as a woman whose beauty distracts from her brains."

Gillan appeared in The Life of Chuck, reuniting with filmmaker Mike Flanagan, with whom she last collaborated on Oculus, which premiered in September 2024 at TIFF.

In August 2025, it was reported that Gillan will be in the upcoming Highlander film alongside Henry Cavill.

In May 2026, Gillan joined the cast of Shrinking season 4. She also starred in the comedy film Let's Have Kids!, which was released digitally on October 13, 2026.

She is also set to reprise her role as Ruby Roundhouse in Jumanji: Open World, which will be released on December 25, 2026.

Gillan also expressed that she would like to do more romantic comedy projects and horror films.

== Advocacy and philanthropy ==
In 2011, Gillan helped promote Fashion Targets Breast Cancer (FTBC) and the opening of Squirrel Ward at the Great Ormond Street Hospital in London.

In 2018, Gillan visited the Mikeysline crisis support centre in Inverness after presenting her film The Party's Just Beginning. The film is about the high suicide rate in the Scottish Highlands, and Gillan made a public pledge to support the mental health charity. In September 2020, the Inverness Courier reported that a student from Inverness was selected in a competition inspired by The Party's Just Beginning to go to New York Fashion Week, held by Mikeysline and Fashion Week Online, in a contest meant to create awareness for World Suicide Prevention Day.

In 2024, Karen Gillan was among British film and TV creatives who donated to an auction to crowdfund for humanitarian relief in Gaza.

== Personal life ==
In May 2022, Gillan married Nick Kocher, an American comedian of the sketch duo BriTANicK, in a ceremony at Castle Toward in Dunoon, Scotland. The couple have a daughter, born in November 2024.

== Awards and nominations ==
Year	Association	Category	Work	Result	Ref.
2010	Constellation Awards	Best Female Performance	Doctor Who	Nominated	
2010	TV Choice Awards	Best Actress	Doctor Who	Nominated	
2010	Cosmopolitan's Ultimate Women of the Year Awards	Best Actress	Doctor Who	Won	
2010	Young Scot Awards	Entertainment	Doctor Who	Won	
2011	SFX Awards	Best Actress	Doctor Who	Won	
2011	TV Choice Awards	Best Actress	Doctor Who	Won	
2011	Scream Awards	Best Sci-Fi Actress	Doctor Who	Nominated	
2012	National Television Awards	Best Drama Performance: Female	Doctor Who	Won	
2012	SFX Awards	Best Actress	Doctor Who	Nominated	
2012	Nickelodeon UK Kids' Choice Awards	Favourite UK Actress	Herself	Nominated	
2012	Scottish Fashion Awards	Scotland's Fashion Icon	Herself	Won	
2013	National Television Awards	Best Drama Performance - Female	Doctor Who	Nominated	
2014	Fright Meter Awards	Best Actress	Oculus	Nominated	
2014	Detroit Film Critics Society	Best Ensemble	Guardians of the Galaxy	Won	
2014	Nevada Film Critics Society	Best Ensemble Cast	Guardians of the Galaxy	Won	
2014	Phoenix Film Critics Society	Best Cast	Guardians of the Galaxy	Nominated	
2015	Central Ohio Film Critics Association	Guardians of the Galaxy	Best Ensemble	Nominated	
2015	Empire Awards	Best Female Newcomer	Guardians of the Galaxy and Oculus	Won	
2015	Fangoria Chainsaw Awards	Best Actress (long list)	Oculus	Nominated	
2015	Hang Onto Your Shorts Film Festival	Best in a Short Film (long)	Bound for Greatness	Nominated	
2015	IFS Film Festival	Best Actress in a Short Film	Bound for Greatness	Won	
2015	IFS Film Festival	Best Independent Short	Coward	Won	
2015	Edinburgh International Film Festival	Best Short Film	Coward	Nominated	
2015	Rondo Hatton Classic Horror Awards	Best Short Film	Conventional	Nominated	
2016	London IFF Film Festival	Best Lead Actress in a Short Film	Bound for Greatness	Won	
2016	FirstGlance Film Festival	Best Actress in a Short Film	Bound for Greatness	Won	
2017	Maui Film Festival	Rising Star	Herself	Won	
2018	Glasgow Film Festival	Audience Award	The Party's Just Beginning	Nominated	
2018	MTV Movie & TV Awards	Best On Screen Team (with Dwayne Johnson, Kevin Hart, Jack Black and Nick Jonas)	Jumanji: Welcome to the Jungle	Nominated	
2018	Teen Choice Awards	Choice Comedy Movie Actress	Jumanji: Welcome to the Jungle	Nominated	
2018	DTLA Film Festival	Best Female Actor in a Leading Role	All Creatures Here Below	Won	
2018	Philadelphia Film Festival	Artistic Achievement in Independent Film	The Party's Just Beginning	Won	
2018	British Academy Scotland Awards	Best Feature Film	The Party's Just Beginning	Nominated	
2018	British Independent Film Awards	Best Debut Screenwriter	The Party's Just Beginning	Nominated	
2019	Saturn Awards	Best Supporting Actress	Avengers: Endgame	Nominated	
2022	Critics' Choice Super Awards	Best Actress in an Action Movie	Gunpowder Milkshake	Nominated	
2023	Critics' Choice Super Awards	Best Actress in a Science Fiction/Fantasy Movie	Dual	Nominated	
