= Jumanji: Open World =

Upcoming film by Jake Kasdan

- Theatrical release poster
- Directed by: Jake Kasdan
- Written by: Jake Kasdan; Jeff Pinkner; Scott Rosenberg
- Based on: Jumanji by Chris Van Allsburg
- Produced by: Dwayne Johnson; Dany Garcia; Hiram Garcia; Matt Tolmach; Jake Kasdan
- Starring: Dwayne Johnson; Jack Black; Kevin Hart; Karen Gillan; Alex Wolff; Madison Iseman; Morgan Turner; Ser'Darius Blain; Rhys Darby; Nick Jonas; Danny DeVito
- Cinematography: Ben Davis
- Edited by: Mark Helfrich
- Music by: Henry Jackman
- Production companies: Columbia Pictures; Matt Tolmach Productions; Seven Bucks Productions; The Detective Agency
- Distributed by: Sony Pictures Releasing
- Release date: December 25, 2026
- Country: United States
- Language: English

Jumanji: Open World is an upcoming American action-adventure film co-produced and directed by Jake Kasdan, who co-wrote it with Jeff Pinkner and Scott Rosenberg. It is the fifth and final installment in the Jumanji film series and the sequel to Jumanji: The Next Level (2019). Dwayne Johnson, Jack Black, Kevin Hart, Karen Gillan, Alex Wolff, Madison Iseman, Morgan Turner, Ser'Darius Blain, Rhys Darby, Nick Jonas, and Danny DeVito reprise their roles from the previous films.

The film's plot takes place immediately after The Next Level, in which a heater repair man triggers the console with the Jumanji video game in it, and everything from the game is out of the console, with the avatars roaming around in demo mode. Principal photography took place between November 11, 2025 and March 30, 2026.

The film is scheduled to be released in the United States on December 25, 2026.

== Premise ==
Spencer, Fridge, Bethany and Martha have dealt with the perilous obstacles of Jumanji before, but this time Jumanji is out of the console, while Bravestone, Shelly, Mouse, and Ruby, are roaming around in demo mode.

== Cast ==
- Dwayne Johnson as Dr. Xander "Smolder" Bravestone
- Jack Black as Professor Sheldon "Shelly" Oberon
- Kevin Hart as Franklin "Mouse" Finbar
- Karen Gillan as Ruby Roundhouse
- Nick Jonas as Jefferson "Seaplane" McDonough
- Awkwafina as Ming Fleetfoot
- Alex Wolff as Spencer Gilpin
- Morgan Turner as Martha Kaply
- Ser'Darius Blain as Anthony "Fridge" Johnson
- Madison Iseman as Bethany Walker
- Danny DeVito as Edward "Eddie" Gilpin
- Rhys Darby as Nigel Billingsley
- Marin Hinkle as Janice Gilpin
- Brittany O'Grady
- Dan Hildebrand as Donatas
- Jack Jewkes as Tyson Shepherd
- Bebe Neuwirth as Nora Shepherd
- Lamorne Morris as Heater Repair Man
- Burn Gorman
- Nasim Pedrad

== Production ==
Dwayne Johnson revealed in an interview at the end of 2019 that Rory McCann's villain Jurgen the Brutal is actually an avatar of an unknown player, and would be explored in a potential sequel to Jumanji: The Next Level. In March 2020, Jake Kasdan confirmed early developments for a follow-up film. Kasdan confirmed plans to maintain the core cast of the previous two films. The following month, the filmmaker stated that the story for the next installment was in development. It was later reported that the follow-up film was delayed due to the COVID-19 pandemic.

In November 2021, producer Hiram Garcia confirmed that a pitch was developed and was ready to be presented to the studio after Kasdan finished his work on the upcoming Red One (2024). The following month he reiterated plans to develop the next Jumanji film, once filming on Red One wraps, stating that this time-table works with the actors' busy production schedules. In October 2024, Sony Pictures Releasing confirmed that the film was in active development, with Kasdan returning to write and direct, and Johnson, Jack Black, Hart, and Karen Gillan set to reprise their roles. In October 2025, Brittany O'Grady and Burn Gorman joined the cast with Awkwafina, Alex Wolff, Morgan Turner, Ser'Darius Blain, and Madison Iseman set to reprise their roles from the prior films. The next month, it was revealed that Danny DeVito, Nick Jonas, Rhys Darby, Marin Hinkle, Bebe Neuwirth, and Lamorne Morris would reprise their roles from the previous film, with Dan Hildebrand and Jack Jewkes joining the cast. Nasim Pedrad also features in the cast. The film's complete title was revealed as Jumanji: Open World during the CinemaCon 2026 presentation in April 2026.

=== Filming ===
Principal photography began on November 11, 2025, in Los Angeles. DeVito finished filming his scenes by February 2026, with Black finishing his scenes the following month. Filming wrapped on March 30, 2026. Ben Davis served as the cinematographer.

=== Music ===
Henry Jackman, who previously composed the score for Jumanji: Welcome to the Jungle (2017) and Jumanji: The Next Level (2019), returned as the composer for Jumanji: Open World.

=== Post-production ===
Mark Helfrich edited the film.

== Release ==
Jumanji: Open World is scheduled to be released in the United States on December 25, 2026. It was originally scheduled to be released on December 11, but was moved to avoid competition with Avengers: Doomsday and Dune: Part Three on its second weekend.
