= Morgan Turner =

American actress (born 1999)

- Born: Morgan Jeanette Turner; April 29, 1999 (age 27); West Chester, Pennsylvania, U.S.
- Occupation: Actor
- Years active: 2006–present

Morgan Jeanette "Mo" Turner (born April 29, 1999) is an American actor best known for playing Martha Kaply in the Jumanji franchise.

== Biography ==
Turner attended Methacton High School in Fairview Village, Pennsylvania, and was a member of the school choir.

Turner began acting as a child at the age of five after watching their mother, actress Sandra Landers Turner. In 2010, they had a small role in the film Remember Me starring Robert Pattinson.

In 2011, they appeared as Veda Pierce in the award-winning miniseries Mildred Pierce as the daughter of Kate Winslet's character. In 2017, they appeared in the film Wonderstruck.

Turner’s main recognition came in 2017 with the film Jumanji: Welcome to the Jungle and its 2019 sequel Jumanji: The Next Level. In both films, they portrayed Martha, an intelligent and shy high school student.

Turner identifies as non-binary transgender and uses they/them prounouns.

== Filmography ==
=== Film ===
Year	Title	Role	Notes
2006	Invincible	Susan Vermeil	
2008	The Answer Man	Singing Daughter	
2010	Remember Me	Taunting Classmate	
2013	A Miracle in Spanish Harlem	Sarah	
2014	The Sisterhood of Night	Sarah Burhnardt	
2015	Quitters	Natalia	
2017	Wonderstruck	Janet	
2017	Jumanji: Welcome to the Jungle	Martha Kaply	
2019	Jumanji: The Next Level	Martha Kaply	
2026	Jumanji: Open World	Martha Kaply	Post-production

=== Television ===
Year	Title	Role	Notes
2008	Inseparable	Emily Lambreaux	
2010	Mercy	Molly Singer	
2011	Mildred Pierce	Veda Pierce	
2011	Spring/Fall	Hazel	Pilot
2013	Blue Bloods	Stacey Clarke	
2015	Halal in the Family	Bully	
