= The Well (TV series) =

British television series

The Well is a British horror series that was first broadcast in October 2009 on BBC Two in the BBC Switch Saturday afternoon slot. It was written by Melvin Burgess and is the first project he has written for television and online platforms. The story comprises four ten-minute episodes and three levels of an online game where the audience can explore an online simulation of the main location, a haunted house, playing games and unlocking a back story that relates back to the main story within the television episodes.

== Plot ==
The Well is the story of four teenagers; Beth (Jo Woodcock), Luis (Gregory Foreman), Coll (Karen Gillan) and Ivan (Isaac Ssebandeke) who accidentally uncover a cursed Celtic well and release an evil spirit into the world. The teenagers must discover how to restore order before one of them is killed by the evil hag that they have disturbed, who has already killed a young girl called Bethany who features in the online platform of the show.

== Characters ==
Beth (Jo Woodcock): Beth is the leader of the gang. She has a soft spot for Ivan. Her brother is Luis who is very much the complete opposite of her. She suffers from nightmares which are disturbingly vivid and tries to cover up her fear by being very cocky and pretending to be really cool.

Coll (Karen Gillan): Coll is the most sensible of all of the gang and is extremely intelligent. However, despite her pretty looks, every time she performs well in her exams boys seem to hate her even more especially Luis, much to her disappointment. She is the one most eager to solve the mystery of the well and doesn't give up.

== Online ==
The Well uses an approach of telling a story across different platforms, namely television and online. Although the story can be understood as a four-part television drama, in-between episodes the audience can go online and gain access to the back story.

The online story is set in the 1800s and crosses over into the present day story that unfolds concurrently on television. By exploring a three dimensional replica of the house and completing a series of games, the audience are rewarded with a new piece of the back story which is told to them by ghosts. Each section of story that is unlocked builds to reveal a tale of a young girl called Bethany who also disturbed the well and was eventually killed by the hag.

== Special features ==
When the phone number from the show is dialed from a mobile phone, the phone will receive specialized text messages related to the series.

== Producers ==
The Well was created by Liverpool-based digital media company Conker Media for BBC Switch. The 3D house was created by Milky Tea and the online games by Splinter Design Communications.
