= Jumanji: The Next Level =

2019 film by Jake Kasdan

- Theatrical release poster
- Directed by: Jake Kasdan
- Written by: Jake Kasdan; Jeff Pinkner; Scott Rosenberg
- Based on: Jumanji by Chris Van Allsburg
- Produced by: Dwayne Johnson; Dany Garcia; Hiram Garcia; Matt Tolmach; Jake Kasdan
- Starring: Dwayne Johnson; Jack Black; Kevin Hart; Karen Gillan; Nick Jonas; Awkwafina; Alex Wolff; Morgan Turner; Ser'Darius Blain; Madison Iseman; Danny Glover; Danny DeVito; Colin Hanks; Rhys Darby; Rory McCann; Marin Hinkle
- Cinematography: Gyula Pados
- Edited by: Mark Helfrich; Steve Edwards; Tara Timpone
- Music by: Henry Jackman
- Production companies: Columbia Pictures; Matt Tolmach Productions; Seven Bucks Productions; Radar Pictures; The Detective Agency
- Distributed by: Sony Pictures Releasing
- Release dates: December 4, 2019 (France); December 13, 2019 (United States)
- Running time: 123 minutes
- Country: United States
- Language: English
- Budget: $125–132 million
- Box office: $801 million

Jumanji: The Next Level is a 2019 American action-adventure comedy film co-produced and directed by Jake Kasdan, who co-wrote it with Jeff Pinkner and Scott Rosenberg. It is the fourth installment in the Jumanji film series and the sequel to Jumanji: Welcome to the Jungle (2017). Dwayne Johnson, Jack Black, Kevin Hart, Karen Gillan, Nick Jonas, Alex Wolff, Morgan Turner, Ser'Darius Blain and Madison Iseman reprise their roles from the previous film while Awkwafina, Danny Glover, and Danny DeVito join the cast.

The film's plot takes place two years after Welcome to the Jungle, in which the same group of teenagers, along with an old friend and two unwitting additions, become trapped in Jumanji once again. There, they all find themselves facing new problems and challenges with both old and new avatars, while having to save the land from a new villain to escape. Principal photography took place between January 21 and May 11, 2019, in locations including Atlanta, New Mexico, Alberta, and Hawaii.

Jumanji: The Next Level was first released in France on December 4, 2019, and followed with a release in the United States on December 13, 2019, by Sony Pictures Releasing. The film received generally positive reviews from critics and grossed $802 million against a $125–132 million budget, becoming the tenth-highest-grossing film of 2019. A sequel, Jumanji: Open World, is due to be released on December 25, 2026.

== Plot ==
After their adventures in Jumanji, Spencer Gilpin, Anthony "Fridge" Johnson, Martha Kaply, and Bethany Walker plan to meet up over Christmas break to hang out after being apart for their first semester of college. Spencer, feeling despondent that his life is not as glamorous as his friends', decides to go back to Jumanji, wanting to feel like his avatar again: the strong, courageous Dr. Smolder Bravestone.

On visiting his house when Spencer fails to show up as planned, his friends are shocked to realize he entered the game, having gone back to retrieve the pieces and repair it after the group destroyed it following their previous escape. They follow him, knowing he cannot get out by himself. Unfortunately, Spencer's grandfather Eddie and Eddie's estranged friend Milo, who are upstairs, are also sucked into the game. As Bethany is left behind, she turns to Alex Vreeke for help.

Martha once again becomes the avatar Ruby Roundhouse, but Fridge becomes Bethany's old avatar, Professor Sheldon Oberon, while Eddie and Milo become Spencer and Fridge's old avatars, Dr. Smolder Bravestone and Franklin "Mouse" Finbar, respectively. Expecting the same gameplay, the group is surprised by a new plot: Jumanji is suffering from a drought. To end the game, they must recover the magical Falcon Jewel, stolen by warlord Jurgen the Brutal. After escaping a stampede of ostriches, they meet up with Spencer at a bazaar, who also has a new avatar: a skilled female thief called Ming Fleetfoot.

The group struggles adjusting to their avatars and have trouble with Milo not being able to relay information quickly, and Eddie's volatile carelessness costing them several lives. They reunite with Alex as his avatar Jefferson "Seaplane" McDonough, along with Bethany, who has become a black stallion named Cyclone. Eddie learns that Milo is terminally ill and wants to make amends before he dies, which leads them to reconcile.

The group finds a river with magical water that allows them to switch avatars. This lets Spencer, Fridge and Bethany return in their original avatars of Bravestone, Finbar and Oberon, whilst Eddie and Milo are given Ming and Cyclone respectively. When Eddie and Milo are captured by Jurgen's soldiers, the friends split up to rescue their teammates and get the Falcon Jewel. They fight off Jurgen and his men and steal back the gem. Cyclone, who is discovered to have the ability to turn into a winged horse, flies up to the sky with Eddie, who shows the jewel to the sky, so the sunlight touches it as instructed, yelling Jumanji's name, and therefore completing the game.

Milo, who appreciates his new, flying form, opts to stay in the game. The rest return to the real world, and Spencer reconciles with his friends. Later, Spencer's mother brings a repairman into the house, who sees the broken video game console and inadvertently triggers the game. Simultaneously, a herd of ostriches appears outside the restaurant where Eddie has re-united with the owner Nora, and Spencer and the others are surprised to see creatures from the world of Jumanji loose in the real world.

== Cast ==
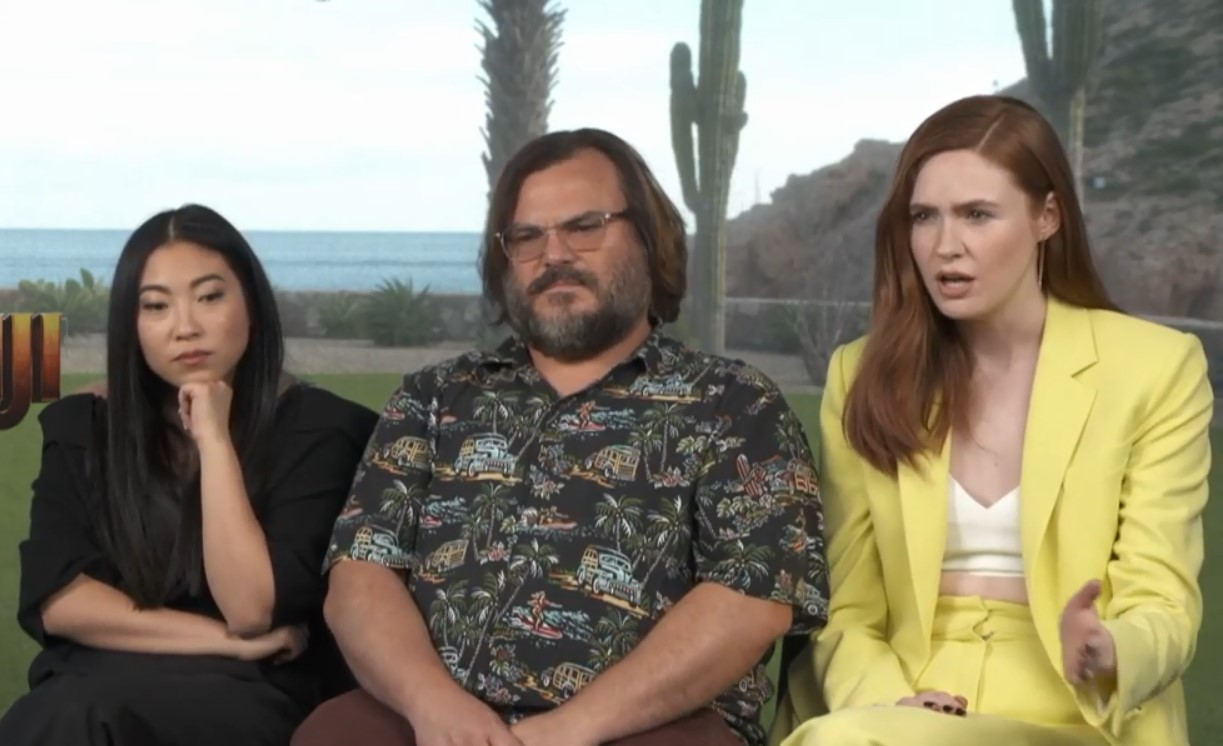
Awkwafina, Jack Black and Karen Gillan promoting the film

- Dwayne Johnson as
  - Dr. Xander "Smolder" Bravestone: A player character and Eddie's avatar initially, later becoming Spencer's avatar again. He takes the form of a strong, confident archaeologist and explorer who now has the weakness of evading Switchblade.
  - Johnathan Bravestone, Bravestone's father in a flashback, with Zachary Tzegaegbe portraying the young Bravestone.
- Jack Black as Professor Sheldon "Shelly" Oberon: A player character and Fridge's new avatar. The avatar is briefly controlled by Martha, and later Bethany. Professor Oberon takes the form of an overweight, male expert in many scientific fields including cartography, archaeology, palaeontology, and geometry;and who now has the weakness of sun, sand, and heat.
- Kevin Hart as Franklin "Mouse" Finbar: A player character, Milo's avatar initially, who later becomes Fridge's avatar. Finbar takes the form of a diminutive zoologist and weapons carrier with some talent in linguistics including animal language as a new ability.
- Karen Gillan as Ruby Roundhouse: A player character and Martha's avatar, who takes the form of a scantily-clad commando who knows martial arts including karate, tai chi, aikido, and capoeira; and who gains a mastery over nunchuks as a new ability. She is briefly controlled by Fridge.
- Nick Jonas as Jefferson "Seaplane" McDonough: A player character, and Alex's avatar once again, who takes the form of an aircraft pilot.
- Awkwafina as Ming Fleetfoot: A new Jumanji player character and Spencer's new avatar, who later becomes Eddie's avatar. Fleetfoot takes the form of a thief with skills in burglary, pickpocketing, and lock picking as well as a weakness to pollen.
- Rory McCann as Jurgen the Brutal, a Jumanjian warlord who is responsible for the murders of Bravestone's parents
- Danny DeVito as Edward "Eddie" Gilpin: Spencer's grandfather, who resents Milo for selling the diner they co-owned.
- Danny Glover as Milo Walker: Eddie's estranged friend, whose falling out resulted from him selling their diner.
- Alex Wolff as Spencer Gilpin: A new college student struggling to adjust to his new life and Martha's boyfriend.
- Morgan Turner as Martha Kaply: A new college student and Spencer's girlfriend.
- Ser'Darius Blain as Anthony "Fridge" Johnson: A new college student and friend of Spencer, Martha, and Bethany.
- Madison Iseman as Bethany Walker: A new college student, one of the four friends who experienced the previous Jumanji, now a travel influencer.
- Rhys Darby as Nigel Billingsley: An NPC who serves as the primary guide for its players.
- Colin Hanks as Alex Vreeke: A previous Jumanji player, now raising a family.
- Marin Hinkle as Janice Gilpin: Spencer's mother and Eddie's daughter.
- Vince Pisani as the Pharmacy Manager
- Dorothy Steel as the Village Elder.

Bebe Neuwirth reprises her role as Nora Shepherd, aunt of the first film's protagonists Peter and Judy Shepherd who attempted to turn the Parrish House into a bed and breakfast.

Also featured as NPCs in Jumanji are Jennifer Patino as Bravestone's mother, Massi Furlan as crime boss Switchblade who is a weakness to Bravestone, Dania Ramirez as Switchblade's seductive wife, John Ross Bowie as Jurgen's butler Cavendish, and DeObia Oparei as an elevator guard. Danny DeVito's daughter Lucy also portrays the NPC of a maiden. Lamorne Morris plays the heater repairman that Janice calls.

== Production ==
Following the release of Jumanji: Welcome to the Jungle, Sony began developing the sequel. Kasdan returned to direct the sequel, with Rosenberg and Pinkner again writing the script and Johnson, Hart, Black, and Gillan reprising their roles. Black confirmed the new film as being a fourth Jumanji film because of Zathura: A Space Adventure (2005), serving as the second film and sharing continuity with the other films of the series, with Jumanji: Welcome to the Jungle serving as the third film. According to Kasdan the film used the working title J-19. The film's title was revealed as Jumanji: The Next Level.

Awkwafina, Danny DeVito, and Danny Glover joined the film in January 2019. Alex Wolff, Ser'Darius Blain, Madison Iseman, Morgan Turner, and Nick Jonas were hired to reprise their roles in February. In March, Dania Ramirez joined the cast of the film. That same month, Rhys Darby was confirmed to reprise his role in the film. Colin Hanks joined the cast in May to reprise his role.

Filming began on January 21, 2019, and took place in the Blackhall Studios near Atlanta, New Mexico, Calgary, Fortress Mountain Resort, Algodones Dunes in California, and Hawaii before wrapping on May 11. Johnson made a reported $23.5 million for his role.

== Release ==
Jumanji: The Next Level was first released in France on December 4, 2019, and followed with a release in the United States on December 13, 2019, by Sony Pictures Releasing. The film was released on digital by Sony Pictures Home Entertainment on March 3, 2020, and was released on 4K Ultra HD Blu-ray, and DVD on March 17. In April 2021, Sony signed a deal giving Disney access to their legacy content, including the Jumanji franchise to stream on Disney+ and Hulu and appear on Disney's linear television networks. Disney's access to Sony's titles would come following their availability on Netflix.

== Reception ==
=== Box office ===
Jumanji: The Next Level grossed $320.3 million in the United States and Canada, and $479.7 million in other countries, for a worldwide total of $800.1 million, against a production budget of about $125–132 million. It was the tenth-highest-grossing film of 2019. Deadline Hollywood calculated that the net profit of the film was $236 million.

In the United States and Canada, the film was released alongside Black Christmas and Richard Jewell, and was projected to gross $45–55 million from 4,227 theaters in its opening weekend. The film made $19.7 million on its first day, including $4.7 million from Thursday night previews. It went on to debut to $59.3 million, topping the box office. It made $26.5 million in its second weekend, finishing second behind Star Wars: The Rise of Skywalker. The following weekend the film made $35.3 million (a total of $59.2 million over the five-day Christmas period), then $26.5 million the next, remaining in second behind The Rise of Skywalker both times. After the COVID-19 pandemic closed most theaters across the U.S. and Canada in March, the film continued to play at drive-ins during the following weeks; it made $217,800 in its 24th weekend and $186,800 in its 25th weekend. The film passed the $800 million mark worldwide on July 7, 2020, thanks to drive-in grosses in the U.S. and theaters re-opening in other countries.

=== Critical response ===
On Rotten Tomatoes the film has an approval rating of 72% based on 249 reviews, with an average rating of 6.1/10. The website's critics consensus reads: "Like many classic games, Jumanji: The Next Level retains core components of what came before while adding enough fresh bits to keep things playable." On Metacritic, the film has a weighted average score of 58 out of 100 based on 37 critics, indicating "mixed or average" reviews. Audiences polled by CinemaScore gave the film an average grade of "A−" on an A+ to F scale, while those at PostTrak gave it an average 3.5 out of 5 stars, with 58% saying they would definitely recommend it.

Peter Debruge of Variety wrote: "More often than not, effects-driven blockbusters get dumber as the series goes along, but Jumanji: The Next Level invents some fun ideas to keep things fresh." Debruge calls Johnson's Danny DeVito impression "unintentionally hilarious", and is mildly critical of some of the off color jokes, but concludes: "The storytelling may be sloppy in parts, but the cast's collective charisma more than compensates." Peter Travers of Rolling Stone is positive about the remixing of the characters having "major comedy benefits" and Travers welcomes the introduction of Awkwafina. He found the plot difficult to follow and not worth the effort, but says "what matters are the laughs and the FX". Peter Bradshaw of The Guardian wrote: "What gives Jumanji its likability is that it has the emphases and comedy beats of an animation, but also the performance technique of live action – and the occasional reshuffling of avatars and players lets the actors show off a little bit further. Jumanji's next level is rather satisfying."

=== Accolades ===
At the 2020 Kids' Choice Awards, Jumanji: The Next Level received nominations for Favorite Movie and Favorite Movie Actor for Johnson and Hart, which Johnson won. The film's visual effects received the Asian Academy Creative Award for Best Visual or Special FX in TV Series or Feature Film at the second ceremony, and a nomination for Best Visual Effects or Animation at the 10th AACTA Awards. It was nominated at the Golden Trailer Awards for Best Fantasy Adventure and Best Comedy/Drama TrailerByte for a Feature Film. At the 46th Saturn Awards, it received a nomination for Best Fantasy Film, but lost to Once Upon a Time in Hollywood, another film from Columbia Pictures.

== Sequel ==
Dwayne Johnson revealed in an interview that the villain Jurgen the Brutal is actually an avatar of an unknown character, and would be explored in a potential sequel. In March 2020, Jake Kasdan confirmed early developments for a follow-up film. Kasdan confirmed plans to maintain the core cast of the previous two films. The following month, the filmmaker stated that the story for the next installment was in development. It later was reported that the follow-up film was delayed due to the COVID-19 pandemic.

In November 2021, producer Hiram Garcia confirmed that a pitch was developed and ready to be presented to the studio after Kasdan finished his work on Red One (2024). The following month he reiterated plans to develop the next Jumanji, once filming on Red One wrapped, stating that this timetable works with the actors' busy production schedules. In March 2023, Kevin Hart indicated that it would be the final film in the series. Production began in November 2025, with Johnson reiterating that it would be the last film in the series.

Originally, Sony scheduled the next film in the series for release on December 11, 2026, but was moved to December 25, 2026, in order to avoid competition with the 2026 films Avengers: Doomsday and Dune: Part Three.
