= Stacked (film) =

- Written by: Bryony Ive
- Directed by: Jennifer Perrott
- Starring: Mark Bazeley; Eleanor Bird; Karen Gillan; Rebecca Reid; Jack McElhone
- Theme music composer: Iain Cook
- Country of origin: United Kingdom
- Original language: English

Production
- Producer: David Smith
- Cinematography: Charlotte Bruus Christensen
- Editor: Jake Roberts
- Running time: 30 minutes
- Production company: Brocken Spectre

Original release
- Release: 24 August 2008

Stacked is a 2008 British television series pilot episode directed by Jennifer Perrott and written and created by Bryony Ive as her first drama commission, and the first drama film to be created through 4Talent Scotland's television pilot competition. The film stars Karen Gillan, Rebecca Reid, and Eleanor Bird.

== Synopsis ==
Stacked follows the adventures of three teenage sisters, Ginny (Karen Gillan), Tallulah (Rebecca Reid) and Shona Turner (Eleanor Bird), and their passage into the world of fashion. Their father (Mark Bazeley) is the writer of a popular men's magazine, Stacked.

== Cast ==
- Mark Bazeley as Jamie Turner
- Eleanor Bird as Shona Turner
- Karen Gillan as Ginny Turner
- Rebecca Reid as Tallulah Turner
- Jack McElhone as Alex Mackenzie
- Susan Vidler as Sarah Jane Mackenzie
- Emma Wilson as Alicia
- Joe Cassidy as Police Detective
- Jon Eriksen as Jeff
- Kimberly Gallacher as Mica
- Zaynah Iyyaz as Bibi

== Production ==
Stacked was created and written by Bryony Ive as her first drama commission. Feeling that there was a lack of drama films for young women, she decided she wanted to write a show for and about that demographic. Following upon surveys she had read which indicated "63% of 15 to 19 year olds claimed that glamour modelling was their ideal profession", she decided to tackle the issue in a drama presentation. She sent her original script treatment to Channel 4's 4Talent Pilot competition, received positive feedback in that her film was not set in a school, and expanded it to include more scenes set in the magazine offices. Channel 4 then set her up with the Brocken Spectre independent production company to film the project. Stacked became the very first drama film to be created through 4Talent Scotland's PILOT scheme.

== Reception ==
Stacked won Channel 4's 4Talent Pilot competition, the reward of which was to be aired on Channel 4.
