= Ser'Darius Blain =

American actor (born 1987)

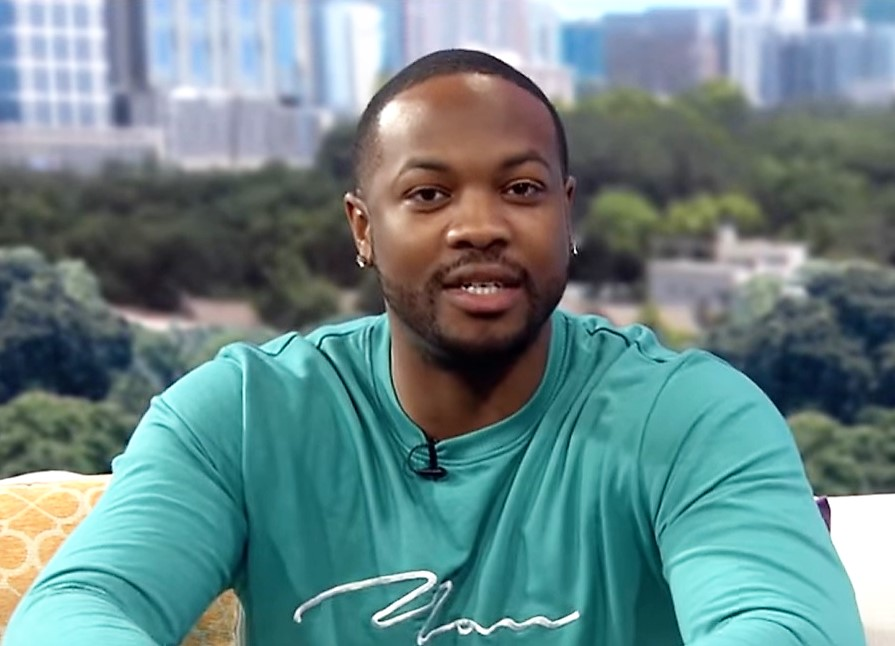
- Blain on Sister Circle Live in 2018
- Born: Ser'Darius William Blain; March 10, 1987 (age 39); Parsippany–Troy Hills, New Jersey, U.S.
- Education: New York Conservatory for Dramatic Arts
- Occupation: Actor
- Years active: 2009–present
- Known for: Charmed

Ser'Darius William Blain (born March 10, 1987) is an American actor. He is best known for his role as Anthony "Fridge" Johnson in Jumanji: Welcome to the Jungle and its sequels. Blain is also recognized for his portrayal of Galvin Burdette in the first season of The CW series Charmed.

== Early life ==
Blain started acting at the age of 12 when he helped his mother rewrite the script for a school play. His mother, a middle school English and drama teacher, cast him in the lead which caused him to "catch the bug". Blain credits this with overcoming his shyness, "l was a super shy boy to the point where I'd hold on to my mother's skirt as a little boy [...] I'd always watched TV and wondered what that must be like". In 2007, his girlfriend convinced him to attend Actors, Models & Talent For Christ which got him into New York Conservatory for Dramatic Arts where he met his manager.

== Career ==
He graduated from NYC in 2009 and since then earned roles in films such as Camp X-Ray and When the Game Stands Tall. Blain played Anthony "Fridge" Johnson in the sequel Jumanji: Welcome to the Jungle (2017), and appeared in director James Kicklighter's short film Angel of Anywhere, starring Briana Evigan and David A. Gregory.

In February 2018, Blain was cast in a regular role for the first season of The CW's fantasy drama series Charmed, a reboot of the 1998 series of the same name. The reboot "centers on three sisters in a college town who discover they are witches." Blain played the role of Galvin, a scientist and the boyfriend of Macy Vaughn (played by Madeleine Mantock), one of the sisters in the series.

== Filmography ==
=== Film ===
Year	Title	Role	Notes
2009	Sucker Punch	Fighter	Short
2010	The Truth About Lies	Michael	Short
2011	Empty Sandbox	Cane	Short
2011	Footloose	Woody	
2012	Belizean James: No Gold Anything		Music video
2012	Private War	LCpl. White	Short
2013	Hearts Gamble	Dc	Short
2013	Star Trek Into Darkness	U.S.S. Enterprise Red Shirt	
2014	Camp X-Ray	Jackson	
2014	When the Game Stands Tall	Cam Colvin	
2016	The Gram	Him	Short
2016	Seduced	Sean	
2017	Maybe Someday	Skip	
2017	Angel of Anywhere	Brian	Short
2017	Jumanji: Welcome to the Jungle	Anthony "Fridge" Johnson	
2019	Beneath the Leaves	Josh Ridley	
2019	Bolden	Willie Cornish	
2019	Seberg	Louis Lewis	
2019	The Last Full Measure	Young Takoda	
2019	Jumanji: The Next Level	Anthony "Fridge" Johnson	
2021	Fortress	Ulysses	
2021	American Underdog	Mike Hudnutt	
2022	Fortress: Sniper's Eye	Ulysses	
2022	Caribbean Summer	Ford	
2026	Jumanji: Open World	Anthony "Fridge" Johnson	Post-production

=== Television ===
Year	Title	Role	Notes
2010	My Life in Facebook	Bob #1	Episode: "Facebook Police"
2010	Meet the Browns	Mack Tight	Episode: "Meet the Telethon"
2012	Jane by Design	Carter	Recurring role
2012	The Vampire Diaries	Chris	Episode: "We All Go a Little Mad Sometimes"
2012	Black Book	William James	TV Pilot
2013	NCIS	Tall Player	Episode: "Squall"
2014	Super Fun Night	TF Green	Episode: "Li'l Big Kim"
2015	Survivor's Remorse	Jupiter Blackmon	Recurring role
2016	Chicago P.D.	Brian Johnson	Episode: "The Cases That Need to Be Solved"
2016	Shameless	Chuku	Episode: "Own Your Shit"
2016	Sweet/Vicious	Damon Avery	Episode: "The Writing's on the Wall"
2018–2019	Charmed	Galvin Burdette	Regular role, season 1
2021	The Big Leap	Reggie Sadler	Series regular
2024	Will Trent	Luke	3 episodes
2024	Christmas on Call	Wes Sullivan	Hallmark Channel Television Movie
2025	The Rookie	Teddy	2 episodes

=== Video games ===
Year	Title	Role	Notes
2013	Grand Theft Auto V	The Local Population	
2018	NBA 2K19	Nickyle Strong	
