= Madison Iseman =

American actress (born 1997)

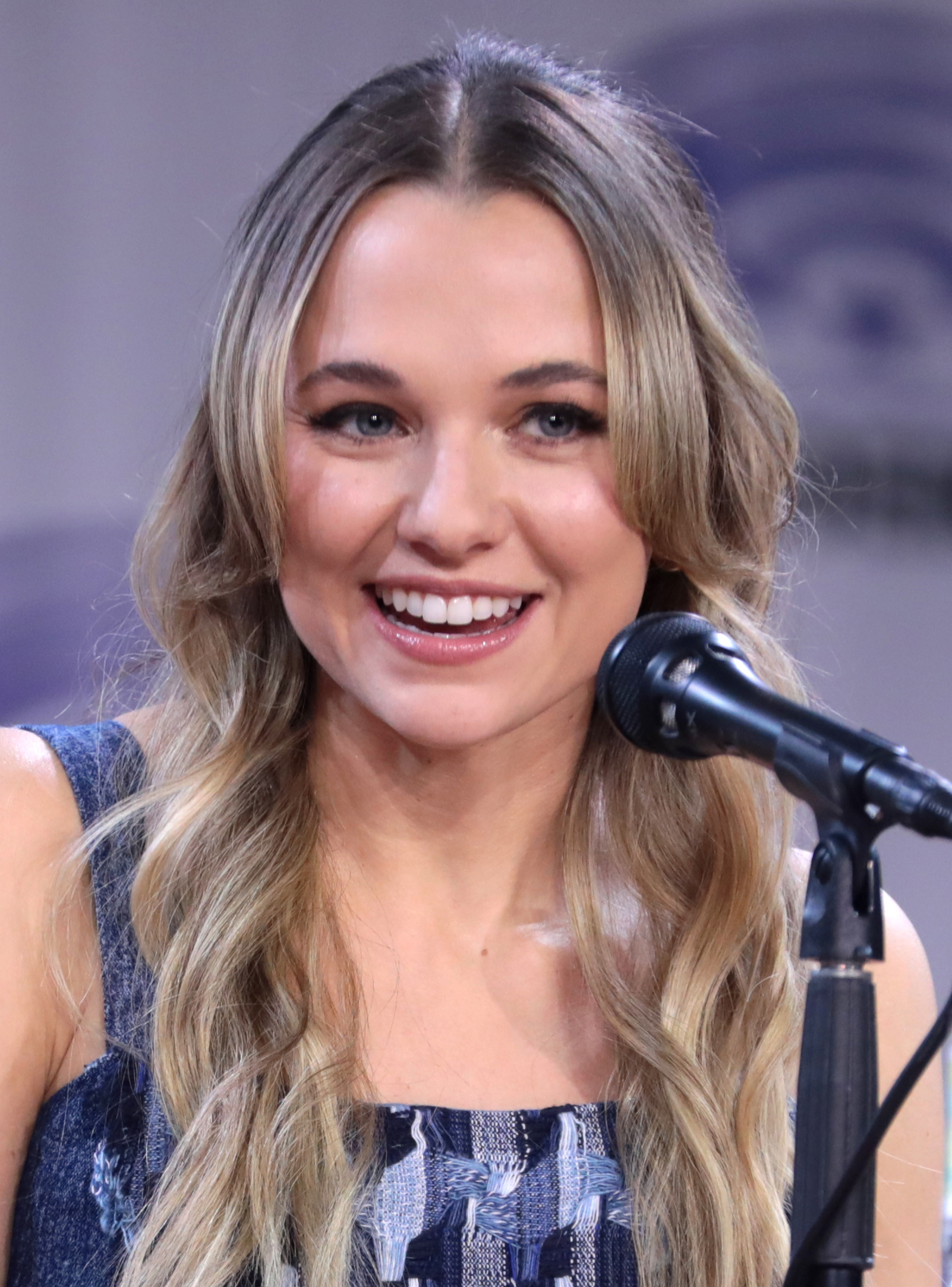
- Iseman in 2023
- Born: Madison Elizabeth Iseman; February 14, 1997 (age 29); Myrtle Beach, South Carolina, U.S.
- Occupation: Actress
- Years active: 2013–present

Madison Elizabeth Iseman (born February 14, 1997) is an American actress. She is known for starring in the CMT comedy television series Still the King (2016–2017). She is also known for appearing in the psychological thriller film Fear of Rain (2021), the fantasy adventure comedy films Jumanji: Welcome to the Jungle (2017) and Jumanji: The Next Level (2019), the comedy horror film Goosebumps 2: Haunted Halloween (2018), the supernatural horror film Annabelle Comes Home (2019) and the Amazon Prime Video horror television series I Know What You Did Last Summer (2021).

== Early life ==
Madison Elizabeth Iseman was born on February 14, 1997, in Myrtle Beach, South Carolina, the daughter of Susan and John E. Iseman, a dentist. She attended a virtual school. Iseman was raised a Methodist and made a mission trip to Kenya in 2012.

== Career ==
Iseman went through four auditions over a period of several months for her role on Still The King. She has appeared in the series Modern Family and Henry Danger.

In 2017, Iseman became known for playing Bethany in Jumanji: Welcome to the Jungle. In the same year, she played Pam in Beauty Mark. She next had lead roles in two horror films, Goosebumps 2: Haunted Halloween, released in October 2018, and Annabelle Comes Home, released in June 2019. She also reprised her role as Bethany in the 2019 film Jumanji: The Next Level, the sequel to Jumanji: Welcome to the Jungle.

In April 2019, Iseman was cast in the lead role of Rain Burroughs in the film Fear of Rain, which premiered in February 2021. Iseman also starred opposite Sydney Sweeney in the horror film Nocturne (2020), playing a twin.

In January 2021, she was cast in the television series I Know What You Did Last Summer, part of the franchise of the same name, in which she played twins Allison and Lennon. The series was cancelled after one season in 2022.

She starred alongside Mackenyu, Famke Janssen and Sean Bean in Knights of the Zodiac, the live-action film adaptation of the manga series Saint Seiya, which was released in May 2023.

In 2023, Iseman was cast in the lead role in Chuck Russell's Witchboard, a remake of the 1986 film of the same name, which was released theatrically in August 2025.

In August 2024, it was announced that Iseman joined the main cast of USA Network's legal drama series, The Rainmaker, which premiered a year later.

== Filmography ==
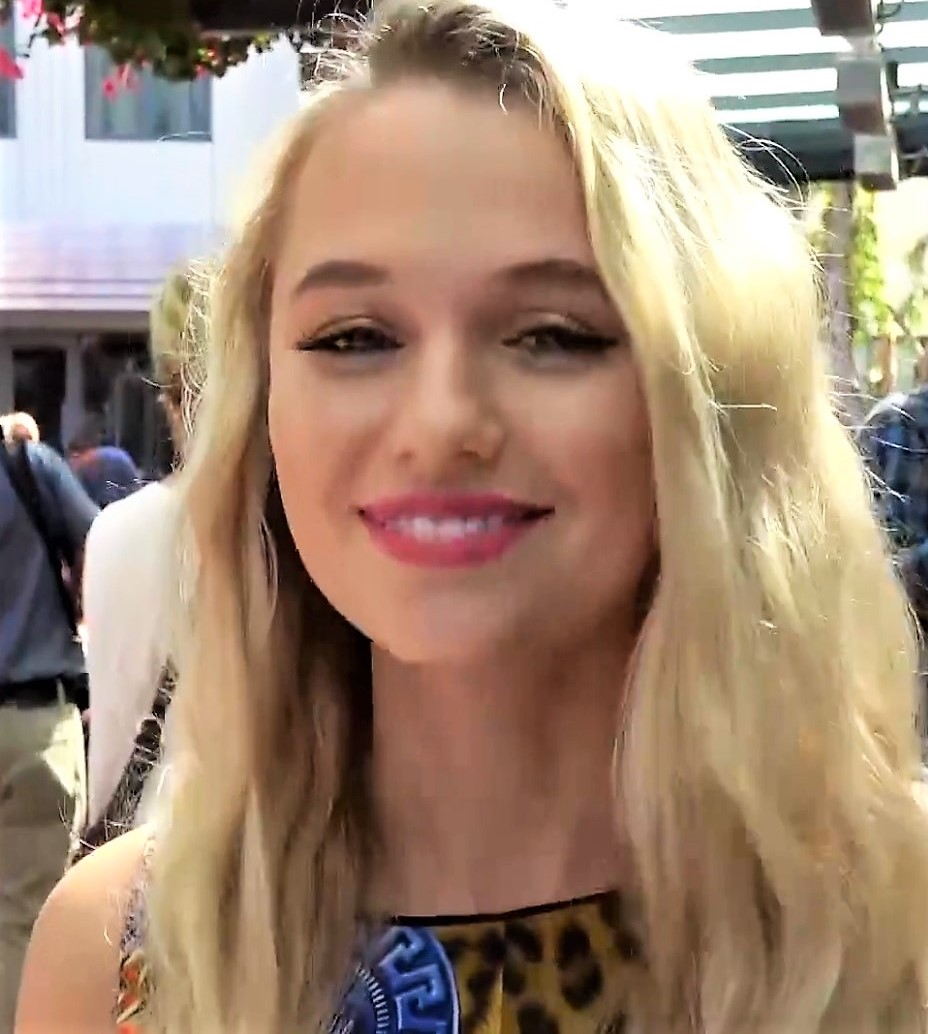
Iseman in 2018

=== Film ===
Year	Title	Role	Notes	Ref.
2013	Second Chances	Charity		
2015	Despair Sessions	Veronica		
2015	The Better Half	Heather		
2015	Tales of Halloween	Lizzy	Segment: "Sweet Tooth"	
2015	Ghost Squad	Brandy		
2016	Marriage of Lies	Kinna		
2016	Liza, Liza, Skies Are Grey	Nancy		
2016	Laid in America	Kaylee		
2016	48 Hours to Live	Young Sherilyn		
2017	Beauty Mark	Pam		
2017	Jumanji: Welcome to the Jungle	Bethany Walker		
2018	Goosebumps 2: Haunted Halloween	Sarah Quinn		
2019	Annabelle Comes Home	Mary Ellen		
2019	Riot Girls	Nat		
2019	Feast of the Seven Fishes	Beth		
2019	Jumanji: The Next Level	Bethany Walker		
2020	The Fox Hunter	Lily O'Connor		
2020	The F**k-It List	Kayla Pierce		
2020	Acts of Revenge	Veronica		
2020	Clouds	Amy Adamle		
2020	Nocturne	Vivian Lowe		
2021	Fear of Rain	Rain Burroughs		
2023	Knights of the Zodiac	Sienna / Athena		
2024	Witchboard	Emily		
2026	Jumanji: Open World	Bethany Walker		

=== Television ===
Year	Title	Role	Notes
2014	Modern Family	Sam	Episode: "Marco Polo"
2015	The Social Experiment	Kaysee	Main role
2015	Henry Danger	Veronika	3 episodes
2015	Kirby Buckets	Rebecca Vanderbuff	Episode: "War and Pizza"
2015	The Bluffs	Leah	Unsold television pilot
2016	The Real O'Neals	Madison	Episode: "The Real F Word"
2016	Those Who Can't	Becky Cosgrove	3 episodes
2016	I Know Where Lizzie Is	Lizzie Holden	Television film
2016	Killer Coach	Emily	Television film
2016–2017	Still the King	Charlotte	Main role
2017	The Rachels	Rachel Nelson	Television film
2021	I Know What You Did Last Summer	Lennon Grant/Alison Grant	Main role
2022	American Horror Stories	Sam	Episode: "Necro"
2025–present	The Rainmaker	Sarah Plankmore	Main role
