= Jumanji: Welcome to the Jungle =

2017 film by Jake Kasdan

- Theatrical release poster
- Directed by: Jake Kasdan
- Screenplay by: Chris McKenna; Erik Sommers; Scott Rosenberg; Jeff Pinkner
- Story by: Chris McKenna
- Based on: Jumanji by Chris Van Allsburg; Jumanji by; Greg Taylor; Jim Strain; Chris Van Allsburg; Jonathan Hensleigh
- Produced by: Matt Tolmach; William Teitler
- Starring: Dwayne Johnson; Jack Black; Kevin Hart; Karen Gillan; Nick Jonas; Bobby Cannavale; Rhys Darby
- Cinematography: Gyula Pados
- Edited by: Mark Helfrich; Steve Edwards
- Music by: Henry Jackman
- Production companies: Columbia Pictures; Matt Tolmach Productions; Seven Bucks Productions; Radar Pictures
- Distributed by: Sony Pictures Releasing
- Release dates: December 5, 2017 (Grand Rex); December 20, 2017 (United States)
- Running time: 119 minutes
- Country: United States
- Language: English
- Budget: $90 million
- Box office: $963 million

Jumanji: Welcome to the Jungle is a 2017 American action-adventure comedy film directed by Jake Kasdan and written by Chris McKenna, Erik Sommers, Scott Rosenberg, and Jeff Pinkner. The film is the third installment in the Jumanji film series, a sequel to Jumanji (1995) and its spin-off film Zathura: A Space Adventure (2005). It stars Dwayne Johnson, Jack Black, Kevin Hart, and Karen Gillan, with Nick Jonas, Rhys Darby, and Bobby Cannavale in supporting roles.

The story focuses on a group of teenagers who come across Jumanji, now transformed into a video game nearly thirty years after the original film's events. They find themselves trapped inside the game as a set of adult avatars, seeking to complete a treacherous quest alongside another player who has been trapped in it since recovering and playing it in 1996. Principal photography began in Honolulu in September 2016 and ended in Atlanta in December.

Jumanji: Welcome to the Jungle premiered at the Grand Rex in Paris on December 5, 2017, and was released in the United States on December 20 by Sony Pictures Releasing. The film received mostly positive reviews from critics, and grossed $963 million, becoming the fifth-highest-grossing film of 2017. A sequel, Jumanji: The Next Level, was released in 2019.

== Plot ==
In 1996, Brantford, New Hampshire, teenager Alex Vreeke receives Jumanji, which was previously disposed of by Alan Parrish and Sarah Whittle in 1969, (Note: As depicted in the 1995 film Jumanji.) from his father, who found it on the coast. Only interested in video games, he sets the boardgame aside. Later that night, Alex finds it transformed into a video game cartridge. Opting to play, he is sucked inside the game, disappearing from the real world as time continues to pass, thus leaving his parents – and their house – in a disheveled state.

In 2017, four Brantford High School students, awkward Spencer Gilpin, athletic Anthony "Fridge" Johnson, ditzy Bethany Walker, and cynical Martha Kaply are given detention – Fridge and Spencer for cheating on their assignments, Bethany for video calling during class, and Martha for insulting the gym teacher. After finding Alex's discarded video game system and starting it up, the group is sucked into Jumanji, landing in a jungle as their chosen avatars – Spencer as muscular archaeologist Dr. Xander "Smolder" Bravestone, Fridge as diminutive zoologist Franklin "Mouse" Finbar, Bethany as male, overweight cartographer and paleontologist Professor Sheldon "Shelly" Oberon, and Martha as sultry martial arts expert Ruby Roundhouse. Three marks on their arms denote their lives in the game, making them afraid that if they lose all three, they will actually die.

The group's goal is to end a curse on Jumanji, brought about by a corrupt archaeologist, Professor Van Pelt, after he stole a magical jewel called the "Jaguar's Eye" and gained control of the jungle's animals. They must return the jewel to the shrine and call out "Jumanji" to lift the curse and leave the game.

Coping with their avatars, their "weaknesses", Van Pelt's men, and their own group dynamics as they begin their journey, they encounter Alex in the form of a fifth avatar – pilot Jefferson "Seaplane" McDonough – who takes them to a treehouse that Alan built during his tenure in Jumanji. Alex thinks he has only been stuck in the game for a couple of months; everyone, including him, is shocked to realize he has been there for two decades. The group coordinate with each other's strengths and work together to overcome the game's obstacles. They manage to return the jewel to the statue and break the curse, defeating Van Pelt and therefore completing the game before returning to the real world.

Back in the present, the group finds the Vreeke home restored and lively from its previous state after Alex's disappearance. They meet Alex, now an adult, who explains that he returned to 1996, allowing him to live his life. He remained in Brantford and now leads a married life with two children; his daughter is named after Bethany to honor her after she had saved him by sacrificing one of her own lives in the game.

The four students form an unlikely friendship after their experiences in the game, having bonded and become better people, including Spencer and Martha beginning a relationship. Soon, after hearing drumbeat sounds coming from the game, they destroy the game to prevent it from endangering anyone else.

== Cast ==
- Dwayne Johnson as Spencer, an intelligent, but unconfident and neurotic high school student transformed in Jumanji into Dr. Xander "Smolder" Bravestone, a strong, confident archaeologist and explorer who has no weaknesses
  - Alex Wolff as young Spencer in the real world
- Jack Black as Bethany, a popular and vain high school student transformed in Jumanji into Professor Sheldon "Shelly" Oberon, an overweight male expert in many scientific fields such as cartography, archaeology, palaeontology, and cryptography whose weakness is endurance
  - Madison Iseman as young Bethany in the real world
- Kevin Hart as Fridge, a high school football player whose friendship with Spencer has deteriorated due to their different social statuses, transformed in Jumanji into Franklin "Mouse" Finbar, a diminutive zoologist and weapons carrier whose weaknesses include strength, speed, and cake
  - Ser'Darius Blain as young Fridge in the real world
- Karen Gillan as Martha, a quiet and shy high school student with a cynical intellect, transformed in Jumanji into Ruby Roundhouse, an explorer and martial arts expert, including capoeira who has a weakness to venom
  - Morgan Turner as young Martha in the real world
- Nick Jonas as Alex, a teenager who has been trapped in Jumanji since 1996, where he is transformed into Jefferson "Seaplane" McDonough, an aircraft pilot with a weakness to mosquitoes
  - Colin Hanks, uncredited, as adult Alex in the real world
- Bobby Cannavale as Van Pelt, a corrupt archaeologist and former partner of Bravestone's (Note: Bobby Cannavale's Van Pelt character is a reimagined version of the Van Pelt in the original film)
- Rhys Darby as Nigel, an NPC in Jumanji who serves as the primary guide for its players
- Marc Evan Jackson as Principal Bentley
- Missy Pyle as Coach Webb
- Marin Hinkle as Jan Gilpin, Spencer's mother

== Production ==
=== Development ===
Plans for a Jumanji sequel were put forward by Sony Pictures Entertainment in the late 1990s. As reported by Ain't It Cool News, a stand-alone sequel entitled Jumanji 2 was in development in 1999. The plot of the story involved John Cooper, the President of the United States, buying Jumanji from an old antique store in Europe and bringing it to the White House to play it with his children (one of whom, Butch, just wants a dad, not a President for a father). Cooper then gets sucked into the world of Jumanji, paving the way for his evil Vice President, who was supposed to be played by Steve Buscemi, to rise to power as Cooper's replacement. Inside the game, Cooper would have teamed up with hybrid animals, which were going to be animated with CGI; Sony Pictures Consumer Products executive VP of worldwide consumer products Peter Dang revealed prototype drawings of animals that might have appeared in the film, all designed by Ken Ralston, who served as visual effects supervisor in the original film and was planned to make his directorial debut with Jumanji 2, slated for a Christmas 2000 release date. The first film's co-writer, Jonathan Hensleigh, had written the initial draft. Ralston eventually stepped down and the project stalled, albeit the DVD commentary of the first film still references a sequel directed by Ralston. Several other directors and writers came and went on the project, including Steve Oedekerk, Adam Rifkin, David S. Ward, Don Rhymer, and the original author Chris Van Allsburg. Then in 2002, a new iteration of the sequel was reported by Variety. Director Dennis Dugan had pitched his own version of the sequel that was said to have used the full potential of the board game and would have brought back Robin Williams, who Dugan believed would have more comedic opportunity. Peter Ackerman was being looked at to write. When they were unable to interest Williams in the sequel, Sony passed on the project and moved on to develop Zathura.

In July 2012, rumors circulated that a remake of Jumanji was in development. Columbia Pictures president Doug Belgrad said: "We're going to try and reimagine Jumanji and update it for the present". It was confirmed on August 1 that Matthew Tolmach would produce the new version with William Teitler (who produced the original film). In August 2015, Sony Pictures Entertainment announced that the film was scheduled for release on December 25, 2016. Online reception to the news was negative, with some saying that the announcement came too soon after the death of Robin Williams in August 2014 (who played Alan Parrish in the original film). The announcement was criticized by Bradley Pierce (who played Peter Shepherd in Jumanji) and by E! News, which called the remake "unnecessary and kind of insulting". Scott Rosenberg was hired in October 2015 to rewrite the script for the film, whose production was a high priority for the studio. Jake Kasdan was hired to direct the film the following year in January from a script by Rosenberg and Jeff Pinkner based on a draft by original writers Chris McKenna and Erik Sommers.

The film's complete title, Jumanji: Welcome to the Jungle, was confirmed in Cinemacon 2017 held in March. Its plot involved teenagers cleaning out a school's basement, who find a vintage video-game version of Jumanji and are sucked into the first film's jungle setting. Although fans debated whether the film was a sequel or a reboot, the second trailer (released that September) indicated that the sequel is set 21 years after the first. Dwayne Johnson noted that the film was inspired by classic video games of the 1990s. The film had used the working title "Jumanji" and the final title and the use of the song "Welcome to the Jungle" was suggested by Jack Black.

=== Casting ===
Dwayne Johnson and Kevin Hart were in early talks in April 2016 to star in the film (although both actors had other projects at the time). Johnson confirmed his casting on Instagram later that month. In July, Nick Jonas joined the film's cast with Johnson, Hart, and Jack Black. Black and Hart were paid $5 and $10 million for their involvement, respectively. The following month, Johnson said that the film would not be a reboot but a continuation of the 1995 film; Karen Gillan was announced as part of the cast. On September 20, Ser'Darius Blain was cast as Anthony "Fridge" Johnson and Madison Iseman as Bethany Walker. Two days later, Rhys Darby was cast as Nigel Billingsley, Morgan Turner as Martha Kaply, and Alex Wolff as Spencer Gilpin. In November, Bobby Cannavale announced his casting in the film, and in December, Tim Matheson joined the cast as Old Man Vreeke.

=== Filming ===
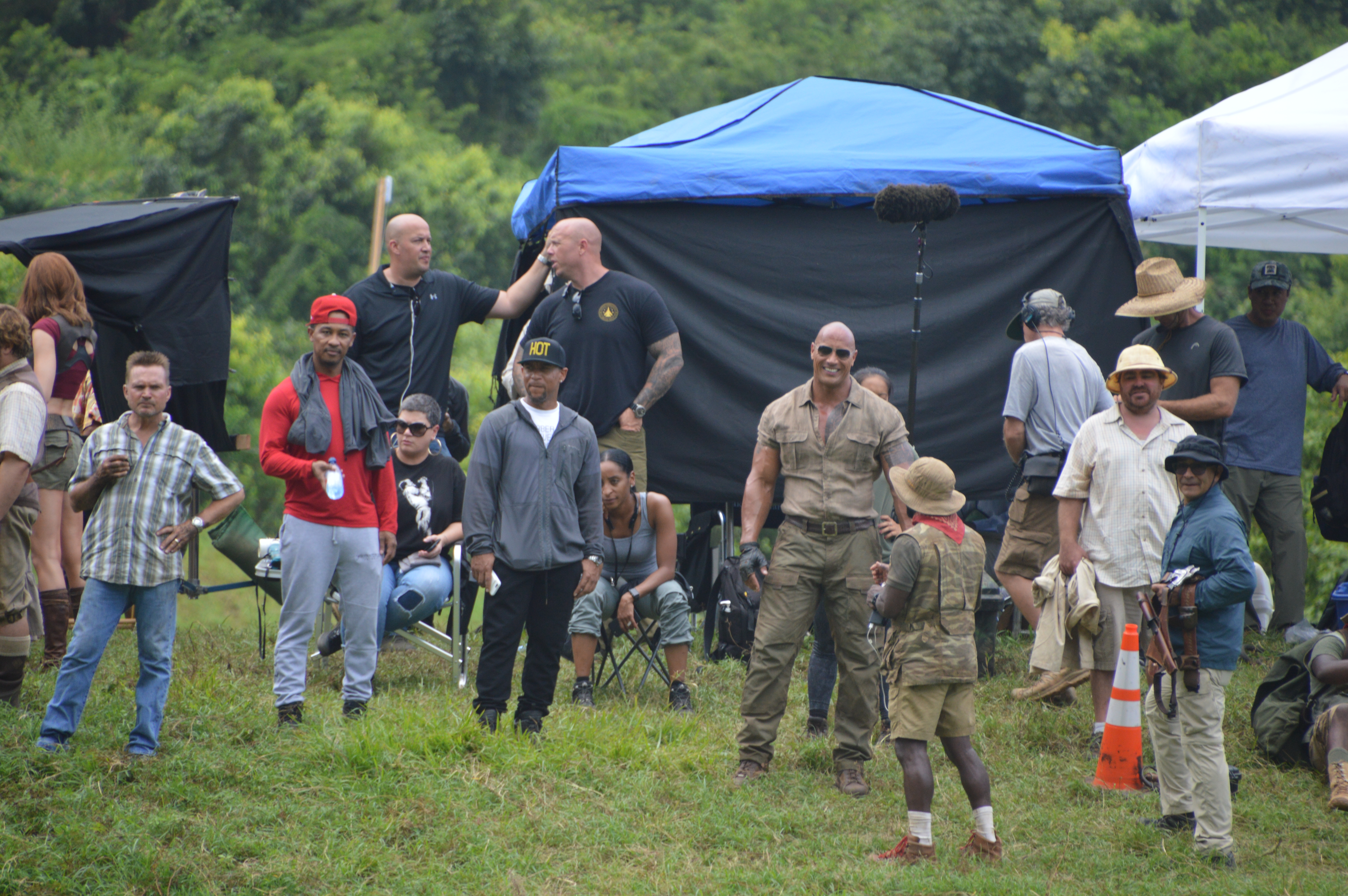
Dwayne Johnson and Kevin Hart on the film's set at Kualoa Ranch in Hawaii

Principal photography began on September 19, 2016, in Honolulu, Hawaii, primarily at the Kualoa Ranch nature reserve. Filming wrapped on December 8 in Atlanta, Georgia.

=== Music ===
James Newton Howard was originally signed to compose the film's score, but was replaced by Henry Jackman when the film's release date was postponed six months. The soundtrack was released digitally on 15 December 2017 by Sony Masterworks.

=== Visual effects ===
The visual effects are provided by Iloura and Supervised by Glenn Melenhorst with help from Moving Picture Company, Ollin VFX and Rodeo FX.

== Release ==
=== Theatrical ===
Sony initially gave the film a release date of December 25, 2016. Since filming did not begin until September 2016, the release was pushed back to July 28 and then to December 20, 2017.

Amazon Prime members in the United States could access to tickets for a December 8 screening of the film at select Regal, National Amusements, ArcLight Cinemas and AMC theaters. The screenings sold out at 1,200 theaters and earned $1.9 million. The film was released on IMAX 2D on January 12, 2018.

In India, the film was released in English, Tamil, Hindi & Telugu languages on December 20, while in China, the film was released on December 29.

=== Home media ===
Jumanji: Welcome to the Jungle was released on Digital HD on March 6, 2018, and on DVD, Blu-ray, Blu-ray 3D (excluding North America) and 4K Ultra HD Blu-ray on March 20, while still in theaters. The Blu-ray and digital versions include two additional featurettes: "Surviving the Jungle: Spectacular Stunts!" and "Book to Board Game to Big Screen & Beyond! Celebrating The Legacy of Jumanji". Jumanji: Welcome to the Jungle made a revenue of $65 million from home video sales with 3.4 million units sold, making it the seventh best-selling title of 2018.

In April 2021, Sony signed a deal giving Disney access to their legacy content, including the Jumanji franchise to stream on Disney+ and Hulu and appear on Disney's linear television networks. Disney's access to Sony's titles would come following their availability on Netflix. The film would eventually be added to Disney+ in select international regions along with the original 1995 film on February 1, 2026.

== Reception ==
=== Box office ===
Jumanji: Welcome to the Jungle grossed $405 million in the United States and Canada and $558 million in other territories, for a worldwide total of $963 million It was the fifth-highest-grossing film of 2017. On April 10, 2018, the film passed Spider-Man ($403.7 million) to become Sony's highest-grossing film domestically. On December 25, 2021, Spider-Man: No Way Home surpassed the film at $405 million to become Sony's highest-grossing film domestically. Deadline Hollywood calculated its net profit as $305.7 million when factoring all expenses and revenues, making it 2017's fourth-most-profitable release.

In the U.S. and Canada, the film was released on December 20, 2017, with The Greatest Showman and was projected to gross about $60 million from 3,765 theaters in its six-day opening weekend; the studio predicted a $45 million debut. It earned $7.2 million on its first day and $7.6 million on its second day. Over the three-day weekend, the film grossed $36.2 million (for a six-day total of $71.9 million), finishing second at the box office behind Star Wars: The Last Jedi. Its weekend-only earnings increased to $50.1 million during its second weekend, again finishing in second place at the box office. The 38.4 percent weekend-to-weekend increase was the fourth-largest for a film playing in over 3,000 theaters; The Greatest Showman set the record for best hold the same weekend. The film passed Star Wars: The Last Jedi for the top spot the following weekend, declining 28.1 percent to $36 million, and finished first again the following week with $28.1 million (and a total of $35.2 million over the four-day MLK weekend). Jumanji: Welcome to the Jungle remained atop the box office for its third weekend, earning $19.5 million.

It again topped the box office for a fourth consecutive week (its sixth week overall in theatres) with $19.5 million, topping new releases 12 Strong and Den of Thieves. The film continued to do well the following week, dropping 16 percent (to $16.1 million) and finishing second to Maze Runner: The Death Cure, before regaining the top spot for a fifth time the following weekend with $10.9 million.

=== Critical response ===
On review aggregator Rotten Tomatoes, the film holds an approval rating of 77% based on 235 reviews, and an average rating of 6.1/10. The website's critical consensus reads, "Jumanji: Welcome to the Jungle uses a charming cast and a humorous twist to offer an undemanding yet solidly entertaining update on its source material." On Metacritic, the film has a weighted average score of 58 out of 100, based on 44 critics, indicating "mixed or average" reviews. Audiences polled by CinemaScore gave the film an average grade of "A−" on an A+ to F scale, while those at PostTrak gave it an 84% positive score.

Dave White of TheWrap praised the cast and called the film a pleasant surprise: "Jumanji: Welcome to The Jungle is the Christmas tentpole release that aims to please and succeeds, a funny family entertainment product that subverts more expectations than it was obligated to contractually". Peter Travers of Rolling Stone writes "enough star power and comic zest to deliver a fun time at the movies ... barely" and praises the cast, particularly Jack Black as hilarious and for finding the "vulnerable heart" of the character. Travers gives the film 2.5 stars out of 4. Peter Bradshaw of The Guardian newspaper gives the film 3 out of 5 stars. Bradshaw praises Johnson for his "endearing performance" and calls it an "amiable effort" which can be expected to go down well on home viewings.

David Ehrlich of IndieWire gave the film a C grade, calling it unnecessary, but mildly amusing: "Jumanji: Welcome to the Jungle is further proof that even the stalest whiff of brand recognition has become preferable to originality. Only part of the blame for that belongs to the studios, but after cannibalizing themselves for much of the last 20 years, Hollywood has clearly eaten their way down to the crumbs". For Variety, Owen Gleiberman wrote: "Excitement! Suspense! Childlike innocence! Ingeniously staged action set pieces! These are a few of the things you will not find, anywhere, in Jumanji: Welcome to the Jungle ... It's supposed to be a board game come to life but really, it's just a bored game."

=== Accolades ===
Accolades received by Jumanji: Welcome to the Jungle
Award	Date of ceremony	Category	Recipients	Result	Ref.
Golden Trailer Awards	May 31, 2018	Best Fantasy Adventure	"New World" (TRANSIT)	Nominated	
Golden Trailer Awards	May 31, 2018	Best Fantasy Adventure TV Spot (for a Feature Film)	"Worlds Apart :60" (Big Picture)	Nominated	
Golden Trailer Awards	May 31, 2018	Best Billboard	"Jumanji: Welcome to the Jungle, Billboard" (BOND)	Won	
MTV Movie & TV Awards	June 18, 2018	Best Comedic Performance	Jack Black	Nominated	
MTV Movie & TV Awards	June 18, 2018	Best On-Screen Team	Dwayne Johnson, Kevin Hart, Jack Black, Karen Gillan, and Nick Jonas	Nominated	
Nickelodeon Kids' Choice Awards	March 24, 2018	Favorite Movie	Jumanji: Welcome to the Jungle	Won	
Nickelodeon Kids' Choice Awards	March 24, 2018	Favorite Movie Actor	Dwayne Johnson	Won	
Nickelodeon Kids' Choice Awards	March 24, 2018	Favorite Movie Actor	Kevin Hart	Nominated	
Saturn Awards	June 27, 2018	Best Fantasy Film	Jumanji: Welcome to the Jungle	Nominated	
Teen Choice Awards	August 12, 2018	Choice Comedy Movie	Jumanji: Welcome to the Jungle	Nominated	
Teen Choice Awards	August 12, 2018	Choice Comedy Movie Actress	Karen Gillan	Nominated	
Teen Choice Awards	August 12, 2018	Choice Comedy Movie Actor	Dwayne Johnson	Won	
Teen Choice Awards	August 12, 2018	Choice Comedy Movie Actor	Jack Black	Nominated	
Teen Choice Awards	August 12, 2018	Choice Comedy Movie Actor	Kevin Hart	Nominated	

== Video games ==
A mobile game titled Jumanji: The Mobile Game, developed by Idiocracy Games and published by NHN Entertainment, was released for Android and iOS on December 14, 2017. The game was removed from Google Play and App Store on May 2, 2018, and its service ended on May 24 making the game unplayable.

A virtual reality experience titled Jumanji: The VR Adventure, developed by MWM Immersive and published by Sony Pictures Virtual Reality, was released on Steam for HTC Vive on January 17, 2018. Although it was announced that the experience would be released on Oculus Rift and PlayStation VR, the releases were canceled, as the game was panned by critics for its poor graphics and hardware performance. It was delisted from Steam on February 9, 2018.

A video game titled Jumanji: The Video Game, developed by Funsolve and published by Outright Games, was released on November 8, 2019, for PlayStation 4, Xbox One, Nintendo Switch, and Microsoft Windows. It is based on Jumanji: Welcome to the Jungle and Jumanji: The Next Level.

== Sequel ==
Dwayne Johnson, Jack Black, and Nick Jonas discussed the plot of the next Jumanji film (referred to as Jumanji 3) in interviews, including the possibility of the film exploring the origins of the game. According to Karen Gillan, the alternate ending of Jumanji: Welcome to the Jungle would have left the door open for another installment. Kasdan returned to direct the sequel, with Rosenberg and Pinkner again writing the script and Johnson, Hart, Black, Gillan and Jonas reprising their roles. Filming began in January 2019. The film was released on December 13, 2019. Awkwafina, Danny DeVito and Danny Glover joined the cast of the film. Black also confirmed the new film as being the fourth Jumanji film because of Zathura: A Space Adventure (2005) serving as the second film and sharing continuity with the other films of the series, with Jumanji: Welcome to the Jungle serving as the third film.
