= The Polar Express =

1985 children's book by Chris Van Allsburg

- Cover
- Author: Chris Van Allsburg
- Illustrator: Chris Van Allsburg
- Cover artist: Chris Van Allsburg
- Genre: Children's picture book
- Publisher: Houghton Mifflin
- Publication date: November 12, 1985
- Publication place: United States
- Media type: Print (hardcover)
- Pages: 32
- ISBN: 978-0-7587-0066-7
- OCLC: 12162097
- Dewey Decimal: [E] 19
- LC Class: PZ7.V266 Po 1985
- Preceded by: The Mysteries of Harris Burdick
- Followed by: The Stranger

The Polar Express is a 1985 fantasy children's picture book written and illustrated by American author Chris Van Allsburg. Critics and various educators have described the book as a landmark in children's Christmas literature, and it is widely praised for its atmospheric illustrations by Van Allsburg himself and how it is a book about having faith. It was praised for its detailed illustrations and calm, relaxing storyline. For the work, Van Allsburg won the annual Caldecott Medal for illustration of an American children's picture book in 1986, his second after Jumanji.

Van Allsburg based the story on a mental image of a child wandering into the woods on a foggy night and wondering where a train was headed. The book is set partially in Grand Rapids, Michigan, the author's home town, and was inspired in part by Van Allsburg's memories of visiting the Herpolsheimer's and Wurzburg's department stores as a child. It was adapted as a motion-capture film in 2004 starring Tom Hanks and directed by Robert Zemeckis. Van Allsburg served as an executive producer on the film.

The book tells the story of a young boy who boards a magical train on Christmas Eve bound for the North Pole, where he receives a bell from Santa's sleigh as his first gift.

The book has sold more than 6.5 million copies and has been on the New York Times bestseller list every Christmas season since its first publication. It has been the inspiration for educational use, as well as for a 2004 film and many real-life train rides across the US, Canada, and the UK.

== Plot summary ==
On Christmas Eve, a young boy hears the sound of a train. He looks through the window to see it right outside his house. He goes outside, where a conductor explains that the train is called the Polar Express and is journeying to the North Pole. The boy boards the train, which is filled with other children in their pajamas and nightgowns. They all sing carols and are served hot chocolate by the train's staff.

The Polar Express races north past towns and villages, through boreal forests, and over mountains, and never slows. When it arrives at the North Pole, the conductor explains that Santa Claus will select one of them to receive the first gift of Christmas.

The boy is handpicked by Santa to receive the first gift of Christmas. The boy asks for a bell from Santa’s sleigh, cut by an elf from a reindeer’s harness. As the train departs, the boy discovers that the bell had fallen through a hole in his pocket. The boy arrives home, the conductor wishing him a merry Christmas as the train speeds away.

On Christmas morning, his sister Sarah finds a small box for the boy behind the tree. The boy finds a bell inside, delivered by Santa, along with a note to fix the hole in his pocket. When the boy rings the bell, both he and his sister marvel at the beautiful sound. His parents, however, are unable to hear the bell and remark that it is broken. The book ends with the following line:

At one time, most of my friends could hear the bell, but as years passed, it fell silent for all of them. Even Sarah found one Christmas that she could no longer hear its sweet sound. Though I've grown old, the bell still rings for me, as it does for all who truly believe.

== Themes ==
The most central theme of The Polar Express is the desire to believe and faith. In the speech Van Allsburg gave for his acceptance of the 1986 Caldecott Medal, he states that "when I started The Polar Express, I thought I was writing about a train trip, but the story was actually about faith and the desire to believe in something."This theme is present through the silver bell in the book, which can only be heard by those who truly believe.

Critics have also noted the loss of innocence and the meditation on children innocence that accompanies growing up.Van Allsburg has also talked about why the story resonates with adults: the feeling of loss, because he thinks "it has to do with something else people lose when they get older, which is the ability to believe in something that's a fantasy"

The story has also previously attracted educational attention for the way it portrays childhood through a middle-class, nostalgic lens. Scholar Saltmarsh argues that the book's illustrations depict an "orderly" and "middle-class" space and that the narrative of the book uses the journey to reinforce idealized notions of childhood.

== Illustrations ==
The Polar Express was Van Allsburg's second full-color picture book. His first one was The Wreck of the Zephyr (1983). Regarding the illustrations, Van Allsburg preferred to work with pastel pencils as his primary medium, and those pencils had to be very finely sharpened to make sure he had precise detail in his work. The color palette was inspired by the paintings of the 19th-century German artist Caspar David Friedrich. He used deep purples and blues that capture a snowy Christmas Eve atmosphere.

A critic who wrote for Newsweek had previously described the artwork as conveying "sumptuous pastel effects of train lights seen through falling snow." Writer Ingram notes that Van Allsburg's mastery of texture in his illustrations is evident throughout the novel, from the fur of the wolves to the sheen of the bell at the end of the book. The pages that are full of illustrations have muted colors and blurry-looking backgrounds that create a feeling of warmth and intimacy.

The illustrations are a major reason the book has had such a lasting impact; he received the Caldecott Medal in 1986, which is awarded to recognize outstanding illustrations in a children's book. Houghton Mifflin's teacher's guide for the book described the illustrations as creating very expressive characters and scenes that come alive.

== Reception and legacy ==
When the book first came out in 1985, it got reviews very quickly.A review in the School Library Journal states that even though Santa Clause is a well-worn subject, Van Allsburg was able to pull it off, and even called the book straight, clean-cut, and more mysterious for the directness of the subject. Marantz also notes that the book's message on belief and faith keeps all readers young at heart.

The book was a commercial success, appearing on the New York Times bestseller list every Christmas season since its first publication.Just four years after publication, over one million copies were sold, and by its 20th anniversary, more than 6.5 million copies had been sold worldwide.

Based on a 2007 online poll, the National Education Association listed the book as one of its "Teachers' Top 100 Books for Children". It was one of the "Top 100 Picture Books" of all time in a 2012 poll by School Library Journal.

On the occasion of the 30th anniversary edition, Vicki Smith observed for Kirkus Reviews online that the real audience of the book may be nostalgic adults rather than young children who presumably believe in Santa Claus. In effect it questions the existence of Santa Claus, for the plot turns on who does and who does not believe.

== Adaptions ==
At the premiere of the film, Van Allsburg stated that Pere Marquette 1225, a 2-8-4 Berkshire N-1 class steam locomotive, formerly owned by the Michigan State University and now owned by the Steam Railroading Institute in Owosso, was the inspiration for the storyline. He played on the engine as a child when it was on display and was inspired by the number, which to him was 12/25 – Christmas Day. The real 1225 was used to create the CGI version of it in the film.

The Polar Express has inspired real-life train rides across the United States, Canada, and the United Kingdom based on the book and film, where families and children can board trains and have an experience close to what The Polar Express book and movie convey. These train rides are hosted by a number of different railways, including the Grand Canyon Railway, the Great Smoky Mountains Railroad, the Texas State Railroad, the Steam Railroading Institute in Owosso, Michigan, the Valley Railroad in Connecticut, the Western Maryland Scenic Railroad in Frostburg, Maryland, and the Maine Narrow Gauge Railroad in Portland, Maine and others. Beginning in 2016, the UK's Telford Steam Railway offered the Polar Express ride on a steam engine.

The round-trip journey to the "North Pole" commonly includes a live musical performance, hot cocoa and cookies, and Christmas characters such as Santa Claus and Mrs. Claus. At some locations, guests are invited to wear pajamas.

Awards
Preceded by Saint George and the Dragon	Caldecott Medal recipient 1986	Succeeded by Hey, Al
