= The Mysteries of Harris Burdick =

1984 picture book

- Cover
- Author: Chris Van Allsburg
- Illustrator: Chris Van Allsburg
- Language: English
- Genre: Children's literature
- Publisher: Houghton Mifflin
- Publication date: 1984
- Publication place: United States
- Media type: Print (hardcover)
- Pages: 32
- ISBN: 978-0-395-35393-6
- OCLC: 11210543
- Preceded by: The Wreck of the Zephyr
- Followed by: The Polar Express

The Mysteries of Harris Burdick is a 1984 picture book written by the American author Chris Van Allsburg. It consists of a series of images, ostensibly created by Harris Burdick, a man who has mysteriously disappeared. Each image is accompanied by a title and a single line of text, which encourage readers to create their own stories. Many famous writers have tried to put their own twists on the pictures.

The book is available in a Portfolio Edition which includes another image/caption pair from the story "Missing in Venice".

In 2011 a book titled The Chronicles of Harris Burdick: Fourteen Amazing Authors Tell the Tales * was published, composed of stories inspired by the book’s illustrations by noted writers, including Tabitha King and Louis Sachar.

== Premise ==
In an encounter between a children's book editor named Peter Wenders and an author and illustrator named Harris Burdick – who says he has 14 stories that he has written – Burdick brings one picture from each story with a caption. He leaves with a promise to deliver the complete manuscripts if the editor chooses to buy the books. The next day, Burdick did not show up. Burdick had mysteriously disappeared. Over the years, Wenders tried to find out who Harris Burdick was, but he never found out. Burdick was never seen again, and the samples are all that remain of his supposed books. Readers are challenged to imagine their own stories based on the images for the books.

In 1984, Chris Van Allsburg visited Wenders' office, and Wenders showed him Burdick's drawings. Van Allsburg decided that if he were to publish the drawings, they might find out who Harris Burdick was.

Both Wenders and Van Allsburg were sure that someone would come forward with information about Burdick. Then, in 1993, a dealer in antique books told them that he had purchased an entire library that had previously belonged to a recently deceased woman, including an antique mirror with portraits of characters from Through the Looking-Glass. The mirror fell from the wall and cracked open. Neatly concealed between the wooden frame and the mirror was an image similar to Burdick's other works; its caption identified it as being from the Burdick story "Missing in Venice".

As stated on the Burdick website, Peter Wenders died in 2000 at the age of 91. However, given that Fritz can be seen in one of the pictures, it is implied that neither Burdick nor Wenders even existed in real life.

== Pictures ==
- Archie Smith, Boy Wonder
- Under the Rug
- A Strange Day in July
- Missing in Venice
- Another Place, Another Time
- Uninvited Guests
- The Harp (Fritz makes a cameo in this picture)
- Mr. Linden's Library
- The Seven Chairs
- The Third Floor Bedroom
- Just Desert
- Captain Tory
- Oscar and Alphonse
- The House on Maple Street

== Influence ==
The short story "The House on Maple Street" which appears in Stephen King's Nightmares & Dreamscapes is inspired by the last image/caption in The Mysteries of Harris Burdick.

== Film adaptation ==
Walt Disney Pictures and 20th Century Fox announced in July 2019 that they have acquired the film rights to "The Mysteries of Harris Burdick" with Rafe Judkins as screenwriter and Mike Weber, Bill Teitler, Ted Field, Shawn Levy and Dan Cohen producing. This announcement came after Disney and Fox acquired the film rights to another Van Allsburg book, The Garden of Abdul Gasazi, but unlike that adaptation, Van Allsburg is not an executive producer for this film.
