= Zathura: A Space Adventure =

2005 film by Jon Favreau

- Theatrical release poster
- Directed by: Jon Favreau
- Screenplay by: David Koepp; John Kamps
- Based on: Zathura by Chris Van Allsburg
- Produced by: William Teitler; Scott Kroopf; Michael De Luca
- Starring: Josh Hutcherson; Jonah Bobo; Dax Shepard; Kristen Stewart; Tim Robbins
- Cinematography: Guillermo Navarro
- Edited by: Dan Lebental
- Music by: John Debney
- Production companies: Columbia Pictures; Radar Pictures; Teitler Film; Michael De Luca Productions
- Distributed by: Sony Pictures Releasing
- Release date: November 11, 2005 (United States)
- Running time: 101 minutes
- Country: United States
- Language: English
- Budget: $65 million
- Box office: $65.1 million

Zathura: A Space Adventure (or simply Zathura) is a 2005 American science fiction action-adventure film directed by Jon Favreau, and written by David Koepp and John Kamps. It is an adaptation of the 2002 children's book Zathura by Chris Van Allsburg, author of the 1981 children's book Jumanji. It is a standalone spin-off of the 1995 film Jumanji and the second installment of the Jumanji franchise. The film stars Josh Hutcherson and Jonah Bobo as two squabbling brothers who find a mysterious board game in the basement which transports their house into outer space, and must survive and finish the game in order to return home. Dax Shepard, Kristen Stewart, and Tim Robbins are also among the cast.

Zathura was shot in Los Angeles and Culver City, California, and was released on November 11, 2005, in the United States by Sony Pictures Releasing. It received positive reviews from critics and grossed $65.1 million worldwide against a $65 million budget.

== Plot ==
Walter and his brother Danny live in a suburban house, alongside their father, and teenage sister Lisa. One day, while their father is away at work, Danny discovers an old science fiction-themed board game called Zathura in the basement. Out of boredom and a desire to bond with his brother, Danny starts playing, and the game produces a card that warns of him of an impending meteor shower.

A meteor shower strikes the house. Walter and Danny realize the game has affected their reality after noticing the house has been ripped from its foundation, and transported deep into outer space. Lisa wakes up from her nap and prepares to leave for a date, only to be put in cryonic sleep. The brothers learn that they must finish playing the game to return to Earth and restore normalcy.

Walter and Danny confront the dangers presented by the game, including a faulty robot, passing too close to a star, and an attack by a race of reptilian aliens known as Zorgons. In one of Danny's turns, an astronaut appears and instructs them to eliminate the house's heat sources, since the Zorgons are attracted to heat. The astronaut distracts the Zorgons' ship by setting the couch on fire and ejecting it from the house.

Walter demands that the astronaut leave, but Danny lets him stay. Growing increasingly agitated, Walter accuses Danny of cheating by moving his piece when Walter was distracted. Walter wrenches Danny's piece backwards and tries to take his turn. The game reacts as if he was cheating and ejects him from the house, forcing the astronaut to rescue him.

Danny apologizes to Walter, but Walter does not forgive him. On Walter's next turn, he draws a card that grants him a wish, sparking another heated argument between the boys. The astronaut fears that Walter is about to wish Danny out of existence, but Walter instead wishes for a signed American football. When questioned by the brothers, the astronaut reveals his backstory: 15 years ago, he and his brother played Zathura. After an argument, the astronaut drew the "Shooting Star" card, and angrily wished his brother out of existence. The game granted his wish and caused his brother to vanish instantly, leaving him stranded in space because the game cannot be played without a second player. Upon hearing this, Danny and Walter finally set aside their differences.

Lisa awakens from her stasis and turns up the heat, attracting the Zorgons who launch an invasion of the house. Lisa finally realizes the predicament, and the four hide from the stalking Zorgons in a laundry room. Realizing they left the game behind, Danny volunteers to venture out and find it. He discovers the game aboard one of the Zorgons' docked ships and is chased away after retrieving it. When the robot resurfaces to attack the brothers, Walter uses a "reprogram" card he had drawn earlier. The robot targets the Zorgons instead, causing them to retreat.

Walter receives another wish card and uses it to bring back the astronaut's brother, who turns out to be Danny. The astronaut is revealed to an older version of Walter from an alternate timeline. The astronaut praises his alternative self for making a better choice than he did. As the timeline shifts, he and the alternative Danny merge with their counterparts.

The Zorgons return to the house with a larger fleet, intending to destroy it. When Danny wins the game, Zathura is revealed to be a black hole that consumes the Zorgon fleet, Lisa, Walter and the house. The brothers find themselves back in their restored house right before they started the game, just as their father returns home. They finally bond and promise each other and Lisa not to tell anyone about the game or their adventure.

== Cast ==
- Josh Hutcherson as Walter, a 10-year-old boy
- Jonah Bobo as Danny, the brother of Walter
- Dax Shepard as Astronaut, an astronaut in Zathura who allies with Walter and Danny upon his rescue
- Kristen Stewart as Lisa, the older sister of Walter and Danny
- Tim Robbins as Dad, the unnamed single father of Walter, Danny, and Lisa
- Frank Oz as the voice of Robot, a defective robot that attacks Walter and Danny

Additionally, John Alexander performed the Robot, Derek Mears performed the Lead Zorgon, and Douglas Tait, Joe Bucaro, and Jeff Wolfe portray the individual Zorgons.

== Production ==
Director Jon Favreau acknowledged the influence of other films, saying Zathura had some bits like Star Wars, Indiana Jones, Battle Beyond the Stars, and Superman. Favreau was aware of Dax Shepard from the television series Punk'd, but was convinced to cast him because director Mike Judge cast him in Idiocracy and because of his background in improvisation with the Groundlings that Will Ferrell, star of the Favreau-helmed Elf, had also come out of.

Favreau preferred to use practical effects instead of computer generated imagery (CGI) in the film. He said, "it's so fun to actually shoot real spaceships or have a real robot running around on the set, or real Zorgons built by Stan Winston. It gives the actors, especially young actors, so much to work off of". Shepard said he would not have been interested in doing the film if the effects had been CGI-based. Actress Kristen Stewart enjoyed the on-set effects, saying, "When we harpooned walls and ripped them out, we were really doing it. When there was a fire on set, there was really fire," and that "[t]he only green screen I was ever involved with was for getting sucked out into the black hole." The exteriors for the house were filmed at Oaklawn Avenue, South Pasadena.

Miniature models were used to create the spaceships; Favreau enjoyed using techniques used in many earlier films, such as the Star Wars trilogy. In some shots the Zorgon ships were computer-generated, and in many of the scenes digital effects were used to create, for example, meteors and planets, and limbs for the robot suit built by Stan Winston Studios. CGI was used to augment the Zorgon suits, which were constructed so that the head came out of the front of the suit where the actor's chest was and the actor wore a blue screen hood over his own head, and to create an entirely computer-generated Zorgon for one scene. A full life size frozen model of Kristen Stewart was made by Stan Winston Studios. She described the process of modeling and being scanned to make it as arduous; it included details down to the freckles on her arm. She called the result an incredible experience, comparing it to having a twin. Real goats were used and extra eyes were later added using CGI. According to visual effects supervisor Pete Travers, from Sony Pictures Imageworks, it "was a very important aspect of the effects" to retain the stylized "1950s sci-fi look" from Van Allsburg's book, and was inspired by the pointillist style in painting.

Favreau says the most complicated shot in the film was when the house was caught in the gravity field of Tsouris-3. The stage was mounted on top of a gimbal 30 to 40 feet (9.1 to 12.2 m) off the ground, and the gimbal allowed the set to be tilted close to 40 degrees. All the cast and crew had to be safely secured with cables and harnesses. Favreau called it "an overwhelming experience".

== Release ==
Favreau discouraged the notion that the film is a sequel to the 1995 film Jumanji, having not particularly liked the film. Both he and author Chris Van Allsburg—who also wrote the book upon which Jumanji is based—stated Zathura: A Space Adventure is very different from the Jumanji film. The film was marketed by the studio as taking place within the same fictional universe, and series actor Jack Black considers it the second installment of the Jumanji franchise. Van Allsburg attributed the lack of box office success to marketing and timing.

The studio marketed the release of the film in an attempt to generate word of mouth with tie-ins, including an episode of The Apprentice. Favreau appeared as a guest judge, and the show's two teams were assigned the task of designing and building a float to publicize the film. Favreau attended Comic Con for the first time to promote the film.

The film was released on VHS and DVD on February 14, 2006, and a Blu-ray 10th Anniversary edition was released in 2015.

== Reception ==
=== Box office ===
Zathura: A Space Adventure grossed $13.4 million in its opening weekend, while the holdover Disney animated film, Chicken Little earned more than twice as much that weekend. The film lost 62% of its audience the following weekend, in part due to the opening of Harry Potter and the Goblet of Fire. Zathura ended its theatrical run with an domestical gross of $29.2 million. The international box office total was $35.8 million bringing its total worldwide gross to $65 million.

=== Critical response ===
On Rotten Tomatoes, the film has an approval rating of 77% based on 159 reviews. The website's critical consensus reads, "Dazzling special effects for the kids + well-crafted storytelling for the 'rents = cinematic satisfaction for the whole family." On Metacritic, the film has a weighted average score of 67 out of 100, based on reviews from 30 critics, indicating "generally favorable reviews". Audiences polled by CinemaScore gave the film an average grade of "B+" on an A+ to F scale, the lowest in the series.

Roger Ebert of the Chicago Sun-Times gave it 3 out of 4 stars, praised Favreau, and wrote: "Zathura lacks the undercurrents of archetypal menace and genuine emotion [...] but it works gloriously as space opera." Justin Chang of Variety said it was "arguably the best adaptation of a Chris Van Allsburg book to date" and praised "Favreau's amiably low-key sense of humor and assured handling of well-trod emotional territory." John DeFore of The Hollywood Reporter called it a "rare beast -- a family film that even childless adults can enjoy", and praised the performances of Josh Hutcherson, Jonah Bobo, and Shepard. Stephen Holden of The New York Times said Zathura richly gratifies the fantasy of children; "not just to play a board game, but to project themselves into its world". Desson Thomson of The Washington Post wrote that Zathura has "an appealing, childlike sense of wonder".

The connection to Jumanji may have been a disadvantage, with critics such as Luke Baumgarten for the Inlander referring to it as "Jumanji in space without Robin Williams".

=== Accolades ===
Zathura: A Space Adventure was nominated at the 32nd Saturn Awards for Best Fantasy Film, and Best Performance by a Younger Actor for Hutcherson.

At the Hollywood Film Awards Avy Kaufman won the award for Casting Director of the Year, for her work on the film and also Capote, Brokeback Mountain, Get Rich or Die Tryin', and Syriana. At Young Artist Awards Josh Hutcherson won in the category "Best Performance in a Feature Film (Comedy or Drama)" by a Leading Young Actor, and Jonah Bobo was nominated in the category "Best Performance in a Feature Film" by a Young Actor Age Ten or Younger.

=== Legacy ===
In a 2018 review for Den of Geek, Tim George called it "a terrific movie worthy of reappraisal" praising the witty, efficient script, sense of directorial whimsy, and focus on character over special effects.

Favreau said the film wasn't released so much as it "escaped". He further described the experience: "After the highs of the success of [his previous film] Elf, Zathura was sobering and, though it was well-received by the critics and I learned a tremendous amount about visual effects, the grim reality of the movie business hit me like a bucket of cold water."

Jack Black, who starred in later installments of the Jumanji franchise, has expressed interest in the possibility of a Zathura remake or sequel. Hiram Garcia, a producer of the Jumanji sequels, said the game contained multiple universes and that the Bazaar introduced in the 2017 film Welcome to the Jungle was added to be a central hub for a larger game universe that the core characters would not know about and that it could even go into space.

== Tie-in material ==
=== Books ===
Although the film is based on the 2002 illustrated children's book Zathura, several other tie-in books were released, including a novelization Zathura: The Movie – Junior Novel as well as several other activity and play books.

=== Board game ===
A board game that sought to mimic the film's eponymous game was released by Pressman Toy Corporation. Titled Zathura: Adventure is Waiting, the game incorporated a spring-driven, clockwork card delivery mechanism, an astronaut, the Zorgons, the haywire robot and the disintegrating house in various ways.

=== Video game ===
A video-game tie-in was released on November 3, 2005, developed by High Voltage Software and published by 2K Games for PlayStation 2 and Xbox. The games received "generally unfavorable reviews".
