= The House on Maple Street =

- Short story by Stephen King
- Country: United States
- Language: English
- Genre: Science fiction

Publication
- Published in: Nightmares & Dreamscapes
- Publication type: Anthology
- Publisher: Viking Adult
- Media type: Print (Hardcover)
- Publication date: 1993

"The House on Maple Street" is a science fiction short story by American writer Stephen King, published in his collection Nightmares & Dreamscapes. The first volume of the anthology's audiobook includes the story, read by the author's wife, Tabitha King.

== Background ==
The story was inspired by one of the drawings included in the children's book The Mysteries of Harris Burdick, by Chris Van Allsburg. It was later included in the 2011 book The Chronicles of Harris Burdick: Fourteen Amazing Authors Tell the Tales, along with stories by other high-profile writers, including Tabitha King, inspired by the other illustrations.

The story also draws inspiration from Richard Matheson’s 1952 short story "Shipshape Home."

== Plot summary ==
After a summer spent abroad, the four Bradbury children return to their home on Maple Street. They discover that something is growing upwards through the house's walls from below, replacing wood and plaster with metal and machinery, counting down to some cataclysmic event. While the children are fearful of the phenomenon, Trent, the eldest, realizes they have an opportunity to rid both themselves and their beleaguered mother of the tyrannical Lewis "Lew" Evans, their hated and feared stepfather. As the countdown approaches its final minutes, they contrive to lock Lew in his study and leave him to his fate, escaping the house just in time to watch as it raises itself from its foundations and blasts away into the clouds. The story ends with the children waiting on the curb for their mother to return, shaken but glad to be free from Lew's oppressive rule.

== Reception ==
The New York Times reviewer Leonard S. Marcus called the story "a blissed-out tale of revenge."

== See also ==
- Stephen King short fiction bibliography
