= The Wretched Stone =

1991 picture book by Chris Van Allsburg

- Author: Chris Van Allsburg
- Illustrator: Chris Van Allsburg
- Genre: Children's, Fantasy novel
- Publisher: Houghton Mifflin
- Publication date: 1991
- Publication place: United States
- Media type: Print (hardcover)
- Pages: 32
- ISBN: 0-395-53307-4
- OCLC: 23356228
- Preceded by: Just a Dream
- Followed by: The Widow's Broom

The Wretched Stone is a children's picture book written and illustrated by the American author Chris Van Allsburg. It serves as an allegory for the dangers of watching television.

== Plot summary ==
This book is told in an epistolary format in the style of a Captain's journal, as it largely takes place aborad a ship over the course of May 8 to July 12 of an unspecified year.

Told from the perspective of Captain Randall Ethan Hope, the crew of the Rita Anne left for a voyage, enjoying each other's company. About a month later, they find a strange, glowing, cubic stone on a smelly, exotic island without animals. After taking the strange object aboard their ship, the crew becomes obsessed with the stone, abandoning many of their former interests and leaving Captain Hope wondering how to shake the crew out of their stupor. Gradually, the glowing stone turns the entire crew, except Captain Hope, into grinning chimpanzees. Afterwards, the Rita Anne nearly sinks due to a storm. When the stone stops glowing, Captain Hope reverts the crew back to normal by playing violin and reading to them. On June 30, they are rescued by another ship that drops them off at a harbor in Santa Pengal. Captain Hope decides to burn the ship and send it to the bottom of the ocean, taking the stone with it. In Santa Pangol, each crew member finds a ship to return home, though some of them still have some aftereffects of the stone, as they like bananas a lot.
