= Queen of the Falls =

2011 novel by Chris Van Allsburg

Queen Of The Falls
- Author: Chris Van Allsburg
- Language: English
- Genre: Novel
- Publisher: Houghton Mifflin Books for Children
- Publication date: 2011
- Publication place: United States
- Media type: Print (hardcover)
- Pages: 40
- ISBN: 978-0-547-31581-2
- Preceded by: Probuditi!
- Followed by: The Misadventures of Sweetie Pie

Queen of the Falls is a 2011 illustrated children's book written by children's writer Chris Van Allsburg.

== Plot summary ==
Queen of the Falls is about a 62-year-old woman named Annie Edson Taylor who remembers getting closer and closer to Niagara Falls with her father, entranced by the sight and sound of the water. Finally, as a 62-year-old, she goes over the falls in a wooden barrel, seeking fortune and fame.

== Sources ==
- Allsburg, Chris Van (2011). Queen of the Falls. Houghton Mifflin Harcourt. ISBN 978-0547315812.
