= The Sweetest Fig =

1993 children's fantasy picture book by Chris Van Allsburg

- Author: Chris Van Allsburg
- Language: English
- Genre: Fantasy picture book
- Publisher: Houghton Mifflin
- Publication date: 25 October 1993
- Media type: Print (hardcover)
- Pages: 32 pp (hardcover edition)
- ISBN: 978-0-395-67346-1 (hardcover edition)
- OCLC: 27769414
- LC Class: PZ7.V266 Sw 1993
- Preceded by: The Widow's Broom
- Followed by: Bad Day at Riverbend

The Sweetest Fig is a children's fantasy picture book written in 1993 by the American author Chris Van Allsburg. It tells a story of an affluent, cold-hearted French dentist who eats a fig which makes his wildest dreams come true.

== Plot summary ==
Monsieur Bibot is a wealthy dentist. He lives alone in Paris, France, in a fancy apartment with his dog, Marcel, whom he often mistreats and abuses.

One day, an impoverished old woman stops by Bibot's office to have her tooth extracted. After removing the tooth with a pair of pliers, making little effort to lessen the pain of the operation, Bibot is angry when the woman is unable to pay his fee in cash. Instead, she pays him by giving him two figs which she claims will make his dreams come true. Bibot scoffs at the thought of magical figs and refuses to give her any painkillers.

Later that evening, Bibot proceeds to eat one of the figs as a midnight snack. He soon discovers that the old woman is right: Bibot finds himself walking Marcel in Paris in his underwear, stared at by the passersby, and the Eiffel Tower has drooped over. Everything from his dream the previous night has come true.

Horrified and embarrassed by the mishap, Bibot vows to hypnotize himself to control his dreams so that he may become the richest man on Earth. This self-centered plan involves abandoning Marcel, whom he has continued to harm in more ways than one. Then one night, when Bibot is preparing dinner, Marcel quickly gobbles up the second fig sitting on the table. Bibot is furious and chases the dog around the house. Heartbroken over the fig, Bibot goes to sleep. The next morning, however, Bibot wakes up underneath his bed – as the dog. Bibot and Marcel have swapped bodies. Bibot is horrified and realizes that the dog was dreaming about finally getting revenge on his cruel master all along. Marcel, who is now in human form, tells Bibot it's time for his walk. Bibot tries to yell, but all he can do is bark.

== Reception ==
Reception was positive. Publishers Weekly praised the book as an "enigmatic, visually sophisticated tale," calling it a "significant achievement." Kirkus Reviews wrote that Van Allsburg's illustrative techniques and "masterful play of patterns" should please all readers, creating a story that was "wickedly clever, but fun." A review from Booklist called it an "astonishing picture book." School Library Journal wrote that The Sweetest Fig was "a superb blend of theme, language, and illustration... Van Allsburg at his best."

== Film adaptation ==
20th Century Fox, before being acquired by Disney, acquired the film rights to The Sweetest Fig in 2018, with Paul Feig directing and William Teitler, Mike Weber, Ted Field and Jessie Henderson producing.
