= The Stranger (Van Allsburg book) =

1986 children's book by Chris Van Allsburg

- Cover
- Author: Chris Van Allsburg
- Illustrator: Chris Van Allsburg
- Language: English
- Genre: Children's, Fantasy novel
- Published: 1986 (Houghton Mifflin)
- Publication place: United States
- Media type: Print (softcover)
- Pages: 12
- Preceded by: The Polar Express
- Followed by: The Z Was Zapped

The Stranger is a children's book written in 1986 by the American author Chris Van Allsburg. It tells a story of a stranger with no memory of who he is or where he is from. He recuperates in the home of a farmer and his family during the fall season.

== Plot ==
One fall day, while Farmer Bailey is riding down the road in his truck, he hears a thump. At first, he thinks he had run over a deer, but when he gets out to see what he hit, he finds that he has accidentally run over a man. The man tries to leave, but loses his balance and falls down again where he and his wife, Mrs. Bailey, discovers that the stranger cannot talk.

The Baileys call a doctor to examine him. The doctor arrives and takes the stranger's temperature with her thermometer. As the doctor holds it up to his mouth, the stranger blows on it and the mercury inside freezes. The doctor thinks that the thermometer is broken. Although the stranger isn't seriously hurt, he can't remember who he is or where he is from. The doctor gives advice to the Baileys, telling them to give the stranger shelter until he regains his memory. They do and he fits in well with the family and even helps out on the farm. One night, the stranger comes out to have dinner with the Baileys. They are having soup, and the stranger notices steam rising from his bowl. He sees the little girl blowing on the soup to help it cool. He lightly blows on his own bowl, and the steam drifts away. When he blows, Mrs. Bailey feels a draft on her spine.

Bailey enjoys having the stranger as his guest, but he also notices how peculiar the weather has been. The stranger goes for a walk in the forest and notices some rabbits. They would usually stay away from humans, but they walk toward the stranger. It still feels like summer on Mr. Bailey's farm, and the summer warmth makes his pumpkins grow bigger than normal. The stranger notices the curiosities as well. He wonders why the trees on the Bailey farm are still green while all the other trees on the other farms are red and orange. One day, the stranger blows on a green leaf, and it turns to orange. This helps him regain his memory and he realizes it is time for him to leave the Baileys farm. On his last evening at the house, the stranger hugs Mr. and Mrs. Bailey and the little girl goodbye. They come outside to wave goodbye to the stranger, but he has disappeared. When the stranger leaves, fall comes to the Bailey's farm, and the trees are now all red and orange. Etched in frost on the farmhouse window is a message from the stranger that says, "See you next fall".
