= Zathura =

2002 illustrated children's book by Chris Van Allsburg

- Author: Chris Van Allsburg
- Illustrator: Chris Van Allsburg
- Cover artist: Chris Van Allsburg
- Language: English
- Genre: Children's literature, science fiction
- Published: 2002 (Houghton Mifflin)
- Publication place: United States
- Pages: 32
- ISBN: 978-0-618-25396-8
- OCLC: 49031916
- LC Class: PZ7.V266 Zat 2002
- Preceded by: Bad Day at Riverbend
- Followed by: Probuditi!

Zathura is a 2002 science fiction children's picture book written and illustrated by American author Chris Van Allsburg. In the story, implied to be set in the 1950s, two brothers, Danny and Walter Budwing, are drawn into an interstellar space adventure when their house is magically hurled through space. The book is a standalone sequel to the 1981 children's book Jumanji, also by Van Allsburg, and visual and textual references are made to Jumanji in the story. The book was adapted into a film, titled Zathura: A Space Adventure, in 2005.

== Plot ==
Danny and Walter's parents have left for the Shepherds' house. The two quarrelsome brothers each desire opposite activities; Danny wants to play catch, while Walter wants to watch television. Danny tosses Walter a baseball which hits him on the head. Walter then chases Danny through the house and catches him in the park across the street from their house, where they find the insidious Jumanji board game left by Judy and Peter. Danny brings the game home, where he then loses interest in playing it.

Underneath Jumanji, Danny finds another game called Zathura. Danny starts playing this game, then he gets a card that says, "Meteor shower, take evasive action", to which an actual meteor shower occurs. Danny and Walter soon realize that the game is affecting reality and has sent them into outer space. Danny concludes that they must finish it in order to return home, so they continue playing. Soon, Walter loses his gravity and Danny saves him from disappearing into space.

When Walter takes his turn, a defective robot chases him through the house. When Danny takes his, he gets close to a star called Tsouris 3 and gets shorter and wider. Soon, a ship carrying extraterrestrials known as Zorgons arrive and they board the house. The robot chases the creatures away as Walter takes his turn and gets pulled into a black hole and sent back in time. Walter is transported back to when he was with Danny in the park. When Danny finds Jumanji and is about to take it home, Walter stuffs it in a trash can and instead offers to play catch with Danny. Evidently, having gone through these dangerous adventures and helping each other has brought the two brothers closer together.

== Reception ==
Publishers Weekly said the book was a "satisfying enigma" like its predecessor. Booklist said readers of Jumanji would also like Zathura. Alternatively, The Horn Book Magazine said the book did not work as a sequel to Jumanji but worked as part of a series.

== Film adaptation ==
A film adaptation of the book titled Zathura: A Space Adventure was made in 2005, directed by Jon Favreau. It received positive reviews from critics but was a commercial failure.

== See also ==
- Jumanji (picture book)
