= Jumanji (picture book) =

Children's book by Chris Van Allsburg

- Author: Chris Van Allsburg
- Illustrator: Chris Van Allsburg
- Language: English
- Genre: Children's, fantasy novel
- Publisher: Houghton Mifflin
- Publication date: 1981
- Publication place: United States
- Media type: Print (hardcover)
- Pages: 32
- ISBN: 0-395-30448-2
- OCLC: 7196761
- Dewey Decimal: [Fic] 19
- LC Class: PZ7.V266 Ju
- Preceded by: The Garden of Abdul Gasazi
- Followed by: The Wreck of the Zephyr

Jumanji is a 1981 fantasy children's picture book written and illustrated by American author Chris Van Allsburg. The book is about an enchanted board game that incorporates wild animals and other jungle elements as the game is played in real life. The book was adapted into a 1995 film of the same name and spawned a franchise that includes three sequels and an animated series.

A sequel to the book, entitled Zathura, was released in 2002.

== Plot ==
While their parents are out to bring some guests home from the opera, Judy and Peter Shepherd find a safari-themed board game called Jumanji in the park. Instructions on the game warn the two, telling them the game will not end until one player has reached the end and shouts "Jumanji". Despite the warning, they begin to play. The pair soon discovers that any dangers encountered in the game spring to life somewhere in the house, such as a lion the two trap in the bedroom, monkeys that appear in the kitchen, an isolated monsoon inside the house, a dazed and confused safari guide, and a tsetse fly that gives Peter sleeping sickness.

Judy triggers a rhinoceros stampede that wakes Peter, and the two spawn an 8 ft. python and a molten lava "volcano" that comes out of the fireplace. Nearing the end of the game, Judy rolls a 12, enough spaces to end the game, and she shouts "Jumanji" as loud as she can, turning everything back to normal. The siblings rush back to the park before their parents return, and replace the game where they had found it. Judy and Peter's parents return with their opera guests. When Peter talks about their experiences with Jumanji, their mother assumes that they came down with the sleeping sickness and dismisses their story. Looking out the window, Judy and Peter look outside and see Danny and Walter, one of the guests' children, excitedly returning from the park with Jumanji in their hands.

== Development ==
Van Allsburg declared that he often thinks of combining incongruous images to evoke a feeling of "cognitive dissonance", coming up with the idea of wild animals in a living room. Combining that with twisting how board games often rely on the player's imagination, he "wondered what it'd be like to play a board game that didn't require any imagination" because the events actually happened, conceiving a jungle adventure game "in which the game came to life. And all the pictures that I wanted to draw would actually be manifestations of gameplay." The name "Jumanji" was a meaningless name that came to him as he tried to conceive "something slightly exotic and something that evoked the idea of the jungle".

== Sequel ==
Zathura (published in 2002) is a sequel to Jumanji also written by Van Allsburg. In the book, Danny and Walter Budwing (who appear at the end of Jumanji) find a science fiction board game whose elements similarly come to life. It was adapted to the film Zathura: A Space Adventure in 2005.

== Adaptations ==
Jumanji, a 1995 film based on the story, is an adaptation of the picture book. The film has adult characters who did not appear in the original story: Alan Parrish (Robin Williams/Adam Hann-Byrd), Sarah Whittle (Bonnie Hunt/Laura Bell Bundy), Officer Carl Bentley (David Alan Grier), Aunt Nora (Bebe Neuwirth), and big-game hunter Van Pelt (Jonathan Hyde, who also portrayed Alan's father, Sam Parrish). Not only is Alan Parrish the main protagonist instead of Judy (Kirsten Dunst) and Peter (Bradley Pierce), but a background story is added, in which Alan uncovers the game in 1969 after it's been buried for 100 years and then when he and Sarah started playing shortly after, the game traps Alan. Unlike the original story, the animals wreak havoc on the town, Peter turns into a monkey for cheating in the game and after winning the game, the film's timeline gets reset and Alan and Sarah are sent back to the exact moment when they started the game in the first place as kids again with their memories of the whole experience intact. In the film the snake is absent and crocodiles appear in the scene where Sarah summons the monsoon.

The Jumanji animated TV series, roughly based on the book and also a loose retelling of the film, ran from 1996 to 1999. Unlike in the book and film, the game transports Judy and Peter to the jungle after taking turns and reading a clue instead of releasing all of the jungle elements, and there are other villains besides Van Pelt, such as a merchant named Trader Slick and a scientist named Professor Ibsen. In a few episodes, Peter transforms into various animals while trying to cheat. Alan Parrish from the film remains trapped in the game until the final episode, while Danny and Walter from the original book are absent. Unlike in the film, Sarah Whittle does not appear. Van Pelt does not leave the jungle as he did in the film, but still hunts Alan. In the show, Alan is sucked into Jumanji in 1972 rather than 1969. The show includes a tribe of masks called the Manjis led by Tribal Bob.

In 2011, Robin Williams recorded an audiobook for the book's thirtieth-anniversary edition.

Jumanji: Welcome to the Jungle is a 2017 film starring Dwayne Johnson, Jack Black, Kevin Hart, and Karen Gillan. Though explicitly a sequel, it is more of an action adventure than the 1995 film, but it does have elements that calls back to the original film as well as the animated series adaptation.

Jumanji: The Next Level is a 2019 sequel to the 2017 film, which returns stars Johnson, Black, Hart, and Gillan. Awkwafina, Rory McCann, Danny Glover, and Danny DeVito join the cast.

Awards
Preceded by Fables	Caldecott Medal recipient 1982	Succeeded by Shadow
