= The Z Was Zapped =

1987 picture book by Chris Van Allsburg

- Author: Chris Van Allsburg
- Illustrator: Chris Van Allsburg
- Genre: Children's, Fantasy novel
- Publisher: Houghton Mifflin
- Publication date: 1987
- Publication place: United States
- Media type: Print (hardcover)
- ISBN: 0-395-44612-0
- OCLC: 248741285
- Preceded by: The Stranger
- Followed by: Two Bad Ants

The Z Was Zapped (ISBN 0-395-44612-0) is a picture book written by the American author Chris Van Allsburg originally published in 1987 by Houghton Mifflin. The book tells the story "in 26 acts", each showing how each letter in the alphabet caught some bad luck. The artwork has a stark look by using black and white pencil drawings. Each destruction of the letters take place on a proscenium theater stage.

Examples:

- The A was in an avalanche.
- The B was badly bitten.
- The C was cut to ribbons.
- The Z was zapped.
