= Maine Narrow Gauge Railroad Museum =

Historic railway and museum in Maine

Coordinates: 43°39′45″N 70°14′42″W

Maine Narrow Gauge Railroad Co. & Museum

- No. 1 with an excursion train, July 2016

Overview
- Headquarters: Portland
- Reporting mark: MNGX
- Locale: Portland, Maine
- Dates of operation: 1993–present

Technical
- Track gauge: 2 ft (610 mm)
- Length: 1.5 miles (2.4 km)

Other
- Website: https://mainenarrowgauge.org/

The Maine Narrow Gauge Railroad Co. & Museum (reporting mark MNGX) is a 2 ft (610 mm) narrow gauge railway, located in Portland, Maine, United States.

== History ==
Operating out of the former Portland Company Marine Complex, the organization was founded in 1993. The collection consists of passenger and freight equipment, as well as artifacts from the 2 ft (610 mm) narrow gauge railways that ran in the state of Maine in the late 19th century and early 20th century.

The organization operates a 1 1/2-mile (2.4 km) long railroad that runs along the waterfront of Casco Bay and parallels Portland's Eastern Promenade. Historic steam and diesel locomotives and a variety of restored coaches are used to run passenger services on the railroad.

In 2014, the railroad planned to move their equipment and relocate to Gray, Maine with a brand new depot and engine house building planned to be built; however, the plan never came to fruition and the museum decided to remain in Portland.

In 2021, several of their steam locomotives were on long-term loan at the Wiscasset, Waterville and Farmington Railway.

In mid-January 2025, the railroad was shut down for several months as tracks were ripped up for "Portland Foreside", a $660M luxury neighborhood development project, featuring a hotel, restaurant, condos, apartments, as well as an indoor market and public plazas. MNGX originally expected the railroad to be down for two weeks while the tracks were removed and replaced following construction; Foreside claimed the construction was planned to minimize disruption.

In April 2026, the museum announced that they would begin raising funds to construct a new storage facility after its previous building was demolished by developers. The museum plans to raise $100,000 in funds for the construction of the new building.

== The Polar Express train ==
Each year beginning in November and continuing until Christmas, the Maine Narrow Gauge operates The Polar Express excursion train based on the 2004 film The Polar Express and the book of the same name. The train is the largest fundraiser for the nonprofit train museum. In 2023, 23,000 passengers rode The Polar Express train. The train ride includes a visit from Santa and chefs serving hot chocolate and cookies.

== Equipment ==
=== Locomotives ===
Locomotive details
Number	Image	Type	Model	Built	Builder	Status
1		Diesel	23-ton switcher	1949	General Electric	Operational
3		Steam	0-4-4RT	1912	Vulcan Iron Works (Wilkes-Barre)	Operational
4	Frameless	Steam	0-4-4RT	1918	Vulcan Iron Works (Wilkes-Barre)	Disassembled, awaiting overhaul
4		Railcar	Railbus	1925	Sandy River and Rangeley Lakes Railroad	Operational
7		Steam	2-4-4RT	1913	Baldwin Locomotive Works	Operational
8	Frameless	Steam	2-4-4RT	1924	Baldwin Locomotive Works	Stored, awaiting restoration
11		Diesel	DDT 10-ton switcher	1975	Plymouth Locomotive Works	Operational
14		Diesel	CL-2 4-ton switcher	1923	Plymouth Locomotive Works	Out of service
16		Diesel	CL-2 4-ton switcher	Unknown	Plymouth Locomotive Works	Out of service

=== Visiting locomotives ===
Visiting locomotive details
Number	Image	Type	Model	Builder	Built	Status	Notes
5		Diesel	25DM42a	1950	Whitcomb Company	Out of service	On lease from the Edaville Railroad

=== Rolling stock ===
Rolling stock details
Number	Image	Type	Built	Builder	Status
9		Passenger car	1901	Jackson and Sharp	Display
15		Passenger car	1882	Laconia Car Company	Under restoration
16		Passenger car	1903	Jackson and Sharp	Operational
19		Passenger car	1890	Billmeyer and Small	Stored, awaiting restoration
22, 23, 24, 25		Passenger cars	1958-1987	Edaville Railroad	Operational
14		Combine car	1890	Billmeyer and Small	Operational
15		Combine car	1890	Billmeyer and Small	Operational
12		Combine car	1958	Edaville Railroad	Operational
102, 105		Open-air cars	1960s	Edaville Railroad	Operational
50, 52, 56, 57, 60, 62, 70		Boxcars	1889-1905	Portland Company	Operational
Bridgton and Saco River Tank		Tanker car	1903	Portland Company	Stored
101		Caboose	1882	Laconia Car Company	Display
553		Caboose	1904	Sandy River Railroad	Operational
557		Caboose	1913	Maine Central Railroad	Display
40		Flanger	1913	Maine Central Railroad	Stored
2		Snow plow	1900	Bridgton and Saco River Railroad	Stored, awaiting restoration

== Gallery ==
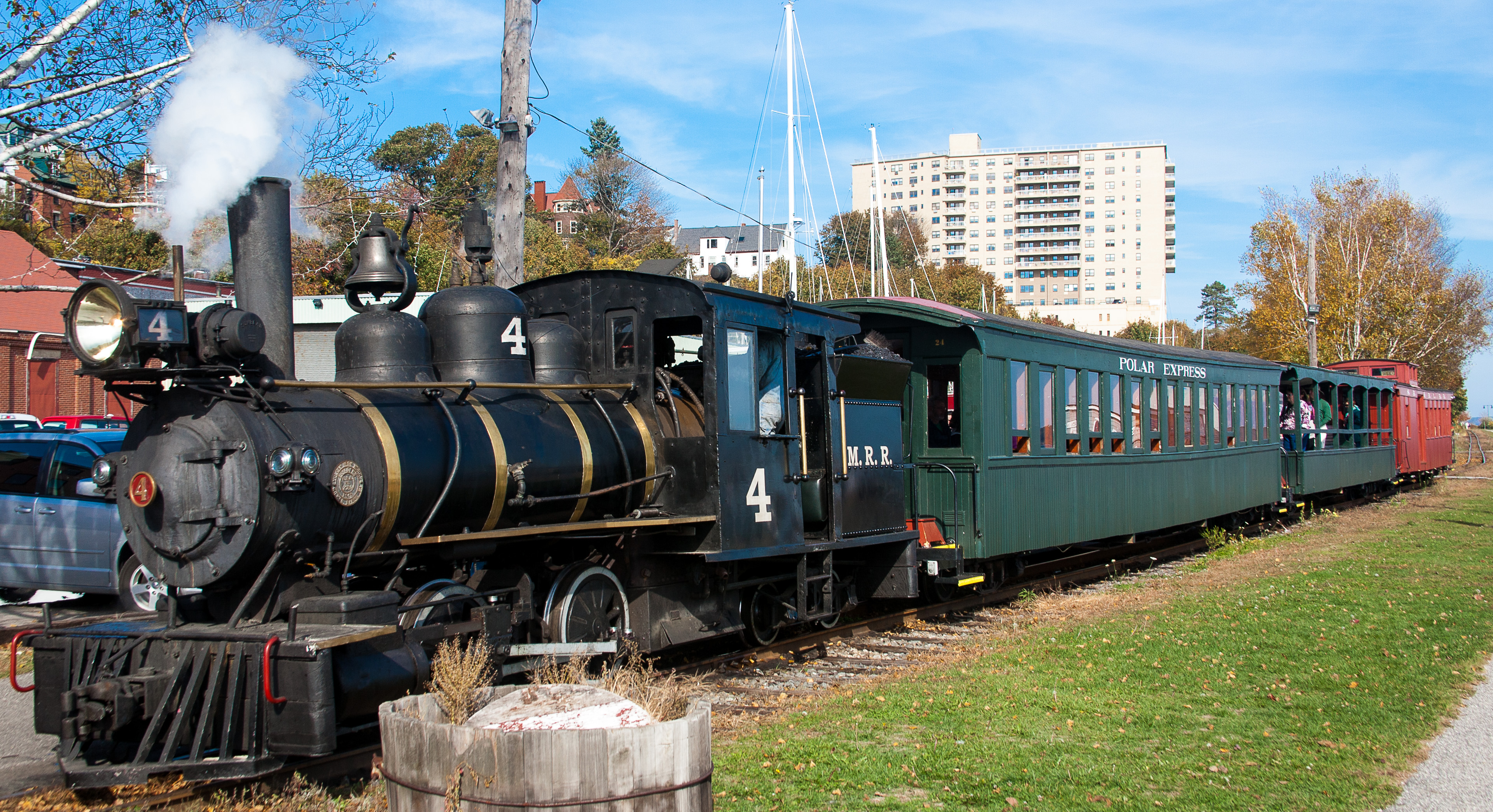
No. 4 hauling an excursion train.

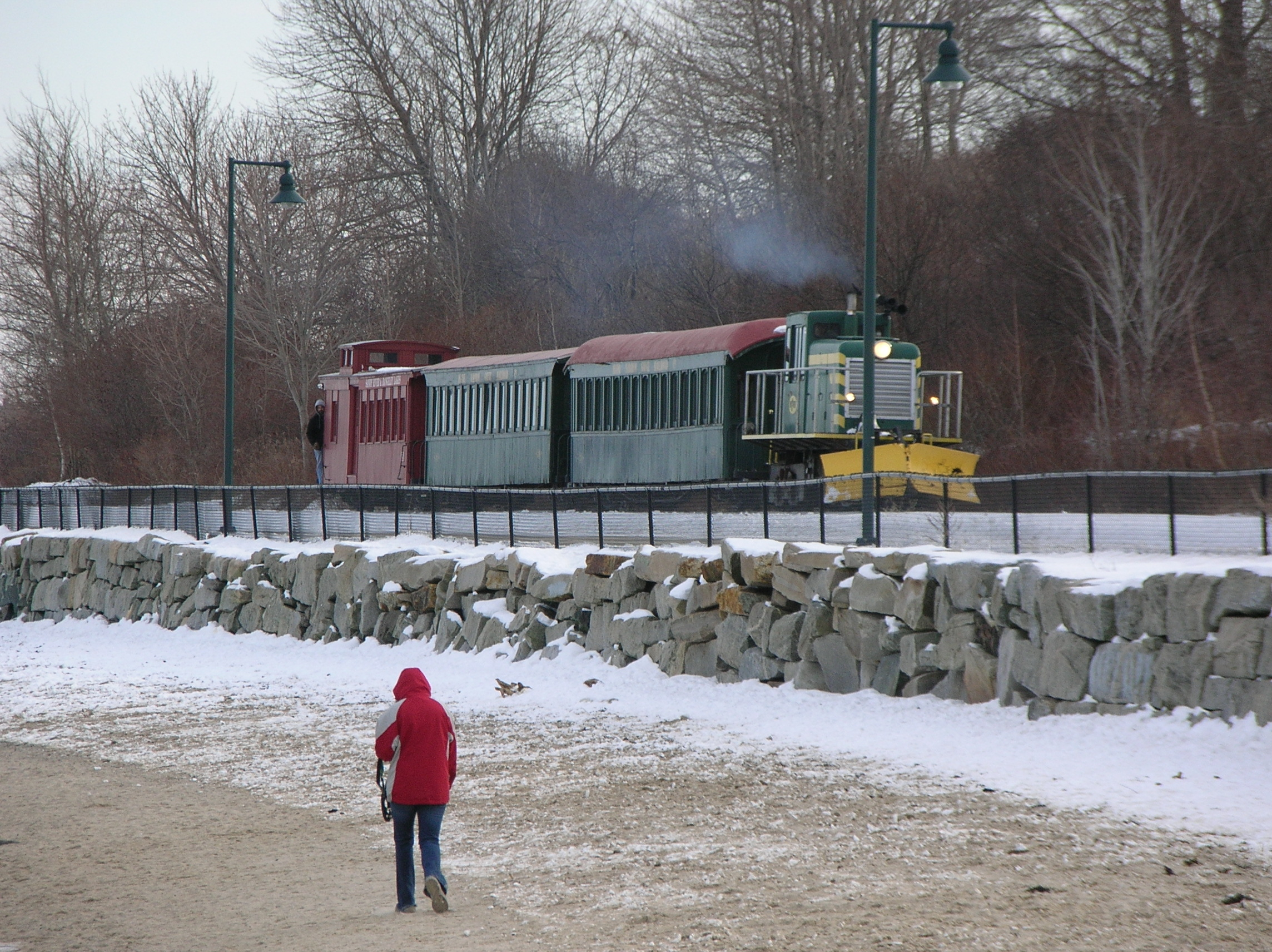
Train operating along the Eastern Promenade.

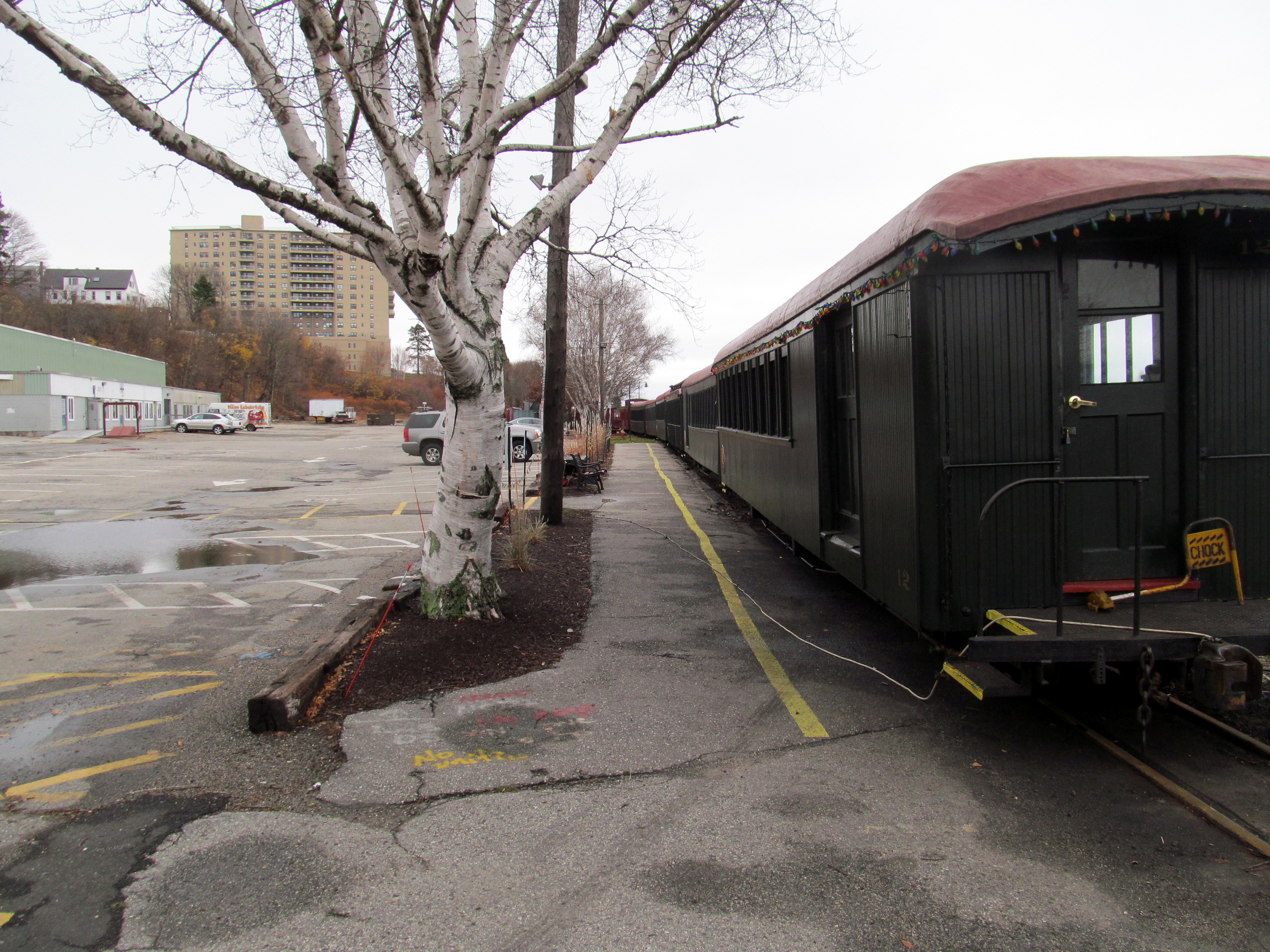
Train parked at the platform.

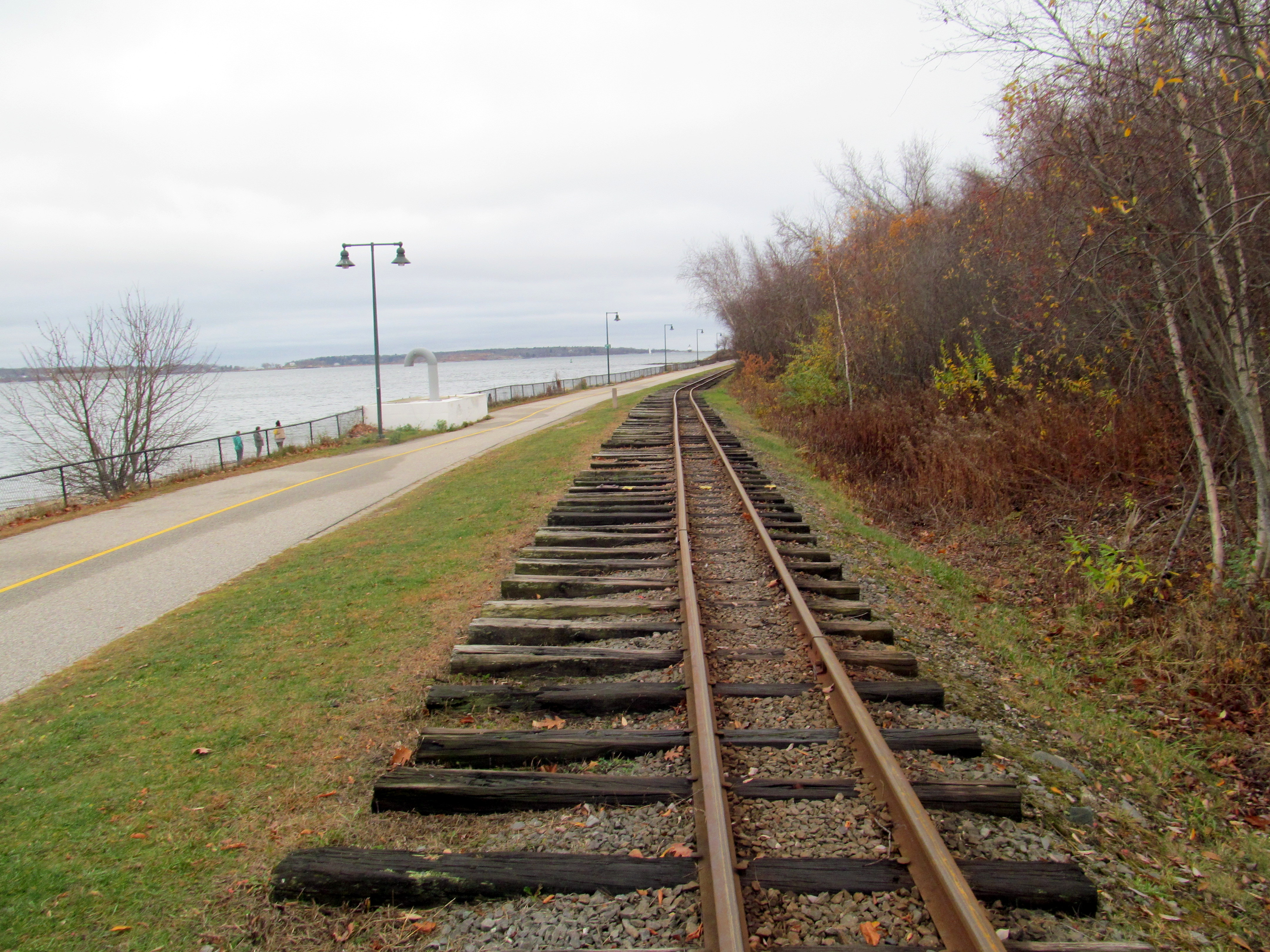
Narrow gauge tracks re-gauged from standard gauge.

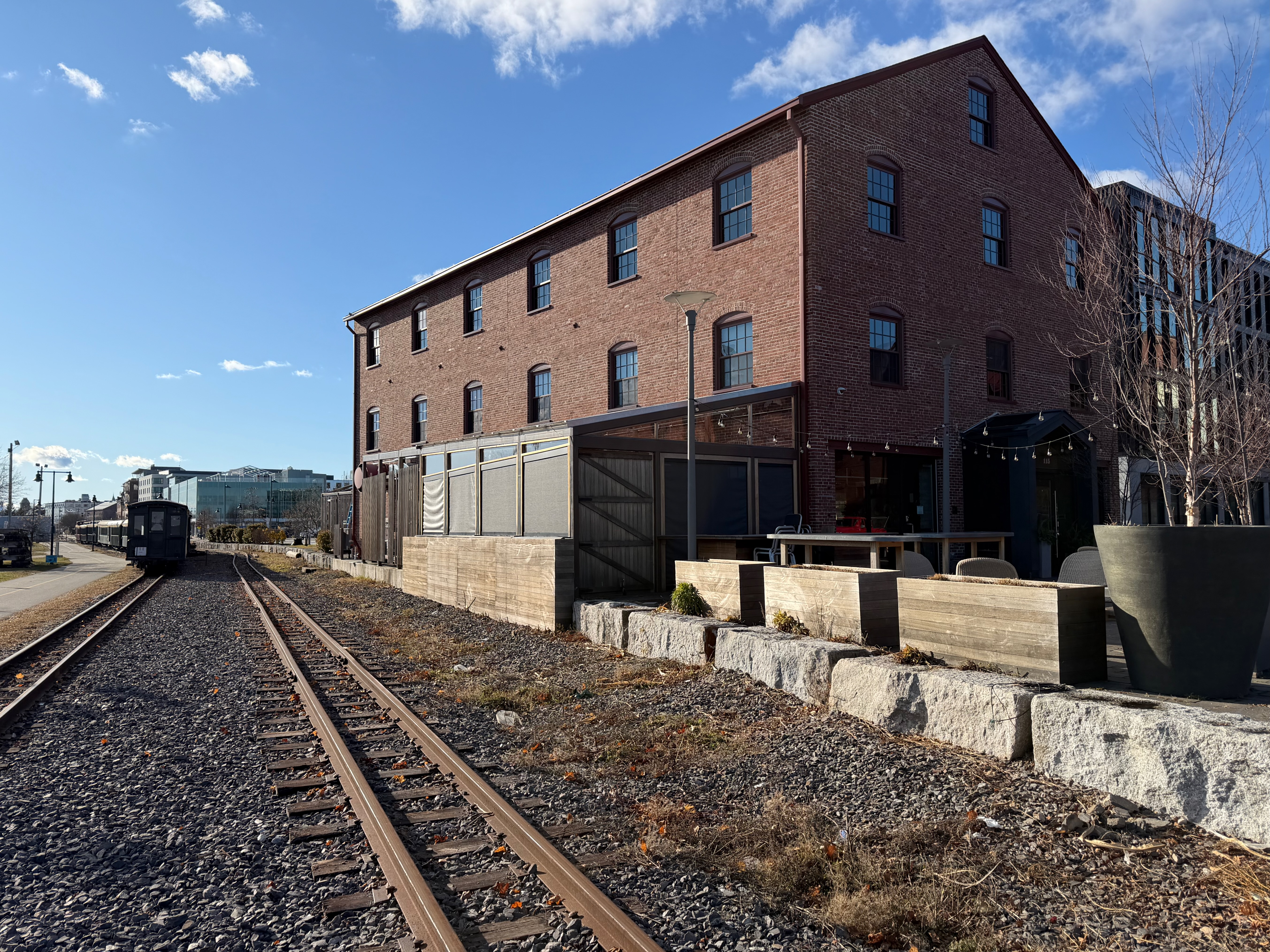
A double-track section of the railroad
