= The Widow's Broom =

1992 novel by Chris Van Allsburg

- Author: Chris Van Allsburg
- Illustrator: Chris Van Allsburg
- Language: English
- Genre: Children's, Fantasy novel
- Publisher: Houghton Mifflin
- Publication date: 1992
- Publication place: United States
- Media type: Print (hardcover)
- Preceded by: The Wretched Stone
- Followed by: The Sweetest Fig

The Widow's Broom is a 1992 children's novel written by the American author Chris Van Allsburg. A film version to be directed by Sam Weisman was briefly in production in 2004.

== Plot summary ==
The story involves a widow named Minna Shaw. One evening, a witch falls from her broom when it suddenly loses the ability to fly, causing the witch to crash-land in the garden near Minna Shaw's house. Minna Shaw takes her in until she recovers, and when she does, the witch calls a friend to "drive" her home, leaving her own broom behind. Minna Shaw discovers the broom is still in her house and leaves it alone but is startled, and more than a little afraid, when it comes to life later that evening. She discovers that the broom is harmless, as all it does is sweep, but she teaches it how to feed the chickens, chop wood, and play the piano. While most of the neighbor women and children are comfortable with the broom, the men are concerned that it had been a witch's broom. Shortly afterwards, two boys begin to harass it. The broom, apparently angered, beats them and flings their dog over the forest. The boys' parents demand that the broom be burned at the stake. Minna Shaw surprisingly agrees, and the broom is burned. Things appear normal until the broom's phantom-white ghost begins stalking the Spiveys' house. The Spiveys are so terrified that they pack up and leave the house. Minna Shaw can now be alone and listen to the broom play the piano; she'd given the Spiveys her own ordinary household broom to burn and cooked up the plan for the magical broom (which was just painted white), to scare her neighbors away. She painted it white to make it look like the "ghost" broom.
