= Probuditi! =

2006 children's book written and illustrated by Chris Van Allsburg

- Author: Chris Van Allsburg
- Illustrator: Chris Van Allsburg
- Genre: Children's, Fantasy novel
- Publication date: 2006
- Publication place: United States
- Media type: Print (hardcover)
- Preceded by: Zathura
- Followed by: Queen of the Falls

Probuditi! is a 2006 children's book written and illustrated by American author Chris Van Allsburg.

== Plot summary ==
After seeing a show by magician Lomax the Magnificent, two friends, Calvin and Rodney, decide to use his hypnosis trick on Calvin's sister, Trudy. The trick is achieved with a rotating spiral disc, and the spell is broken by saying "Probuditi!".

It is Calvin's birthday, and his mother asks him to watch his sister while she's away and when she returns she will make Calvin his favorite dinner, spaghetti.

Calvin and Rodney are successful and Trudy soon believes she is a dog. Calvin and Rodney enjoy watching Trudy until they realize that Calvin's mom will come home soon, and they have forgotten the word to reverse the spell. They frantically try different methods to turn Trudy back to normal, and dumping water on her finally does the trick. However, in the end, Trudy reveals that she was only faking her hypnotized state.

== Trivia ==
Fritz, a dog who appears in all of Allsburg's works, appears as a teapot in Probuditi!

The word "Probuditi" is a Serbian word that means "to wake up (someone else, not oneself)".
