= Two Bad Ants =

1988 book by Chris Van Allsburg

- Two Bad Ants
- Author: Chris Van Allsburg
- Illustrator: Chris Van Allsburg
- Language: English
- Genre: Children's
- Publisher: Houghton Mifflin
- Publication date: 1988
- Publication place: United States
- Media type: Print (hardcover)
- Pages: 32 pp
- ISBN: 0-395-48668-8
- Preceded by: The Z Was Zapped
- Followed by: Just a Dream

Two Bad Ants is a 1988 children's book written and illustrated by American author Chris Van Allsburg.

== Plot summary ==
The title characters, while journeying through a human home, decide to exploit a sugar bowl—full of sugar cubes—on their own rather than taking one sugar cube for themselves like the colony's queen (so each of the ants get one sugar cube and so does the queen ant). The two ants decide that instead of taking one sugar cube for themselves (like the other ants) and leave for their ant hill, they will live in the sugar bowl forever and "eat the tasty treasure forever". But during daylight, the ants are shoveled up by a giant sugar bowl spoon. They experience misadventures: they land in a cup of coffee (after a giant spoon shovels up the sugar cubes into the coffee and gets the ants out), almost get toasted on an English muffin (after mistaking it for a giant disc—a "hiding place disc"—with holes), fall into a sink, get threatened by its garbage disposal unit, and are nearly electrocuted when they enter an electric outlet. Chastened, they rejoin a line of ants carrying sugar cubes back to the colony.

== Interpretations ==
In Philip Nel's analysis, a conflict between the book's plot and its illustrations leads to artistic tension. While the ants' return to the colony suggests "a victory for the bosses" and the narrative could be considered a "capitalist parable", the comparatively huge appliances in the kitchen, which terrify the ants, imply conspicuous consumption. Nel likens the book's resulting ambiguity to the works of Magritte.
