= The Polar Express (film) =

2004 film by Robert Zemeckis

- Theatrical release poster
- Directed by: Robert Zemeckis
- Screenplay by: Robert Zemeckis; William Broyles Jr.
- Based on: The Polar Express by Chris Van Allsburg
- Produced by: Steve Starkey; Robert Zemeckis; Gary Goetzman; William Teitler
- Starring: Tom Hanks; Daryl Sabara; Nona Gaye; Jimmy Bennett; Eddie Deezen
- Cinematography: Don Burgess; Robert Presley
- Edited by: Jeremiah O'Driscoll; R. Orlando Duenas
- Music by: Alan Silvestri
- Production companies: Castle Rock Entertainment; Shangri-La Entertainment; Playtone; ImageMovers; Golden Mean Productions
- Distributed by: Warner Bros. Pictures
- Release dates: October 13, 2004 (Chicago International Film Festival); November 10, 2004 (United States)
- Running time: 100 minutes
- Country: United States
- Language: English
- Budget: $165–170 million
- Box office: $329 million

The Polar Express is a 2004 American animated musical Christmas adventure film directed by Robert Zemeckis, who co-wrote the screenplay with William Broyles Jr., based on the 1985 children's book of the same name by Chris Van Allsburg. It stars Tom Hanks in multiple roles, along with Daryl Sabara, Nona Gaye, Jimmy Bennett, and Eddie Deezen. It depicts human characters using live-action and motion-capture computer animation, with production sequences for the latter taking place from June 2003 to May 2004. Set on Christmas Eve, it tells the story of a young boy named Christopher who travels to the North Pole aboard a magical train guided by its conductor James.

The film premiered at the Chicago International Film Festival on October 13, 2004, and was theatrically released by Warner Bros. Pictures in the United States on November 10. It received mixed reviews from critics and initially grossed $286 million against a record-breaking $165–170 million budget, which was the highest for an animated feature at the time. Later re-releases helped propel the film's gross to $329 million worldwide. As of 2024, a sequel is in development.

== Plot ==
On Christmas Eve in Grand Rapids, Michigan, the Polar Express, a magical train bound for the North Pole, stops outside the house of a boy named Christopher who is beginning to doubt the existence of Santa Claus. He boards the train after being invited by James the Conductor, befriending a spirited girl named Holly and a know-it-all boy named Lenny in the passenger car. The train stops to pick up a lonely boy named Billy, whom Christopher saves from missing its departure by pulling the emergency brake. Billy chooses to sit alone in the observation car.

The children are served hot chocolate, and Holly leaves with James to deliver Billy a cup. Christopher notices her unstamped ticket and attempts to return it to her. The ticket blows through the wilderness and eventually finds its way back onto the train. When Holly discovers that her ticket is missing, James escorts her out of the passenger car. Fearing that she will be disembarked, Christopher travels across the roof to find her, aided by a ghostly Hobo.

Upon reaching the engine, he finds Holly driving the train, as the engineer and fireman repair the headlamp. Following a near miss with a herd of caribou, a throttle malfunction causes the train to speed down a steep hill onto a frozen lake. The lost throttle pin nearly causes a disaster before the engineer regains control.

The train arrives at the North Pole on schedule, where James announces that one of the children will be chosen to receive the first gift of Christmas from Santa. While trying to convince Billy to join in the festivities, Christopher and Holly accidentally unhitch the observation car from the train, causing it to roll along a track into Santa's workshop, where Billy finds a present addressed to him. They are dumped into Santa's sack, where they also find Lenny. After it is loaded onto Santa's sleigh, the elves escort them out.

James, the children, and elves assemble with a large Christmas tree at the center of the city, moments before Santa arrives. During the celebration, a bell comes loose from the galloping reindeer's reins and lands at Christopher's feet; he cannot hear it ring until he wills himself to believe. Santa lets him keep it as the first gift of Christmas. Santa departs, wishing everyone a Merry Christmas. The children board the train to return home as the elves re-hitch the observation car, and Christopher discovers that he lost the bell through a hole in his robe pocket. The train takes the children home, and James personally wishes Christopher a Merry Christmas.

On Christmas morning, Christopher finds a present containing his lost bell with a note from Santa. He and his younger sister, Sarah, joyfully ring it, but their parents can't hear it due to their disbelief in Santa. Christopher (as an adult) recalls that while Sarah and his friends fell deaf to the bell as they got older, he can still hear it, as do "all who truly believe".

== Cast ==
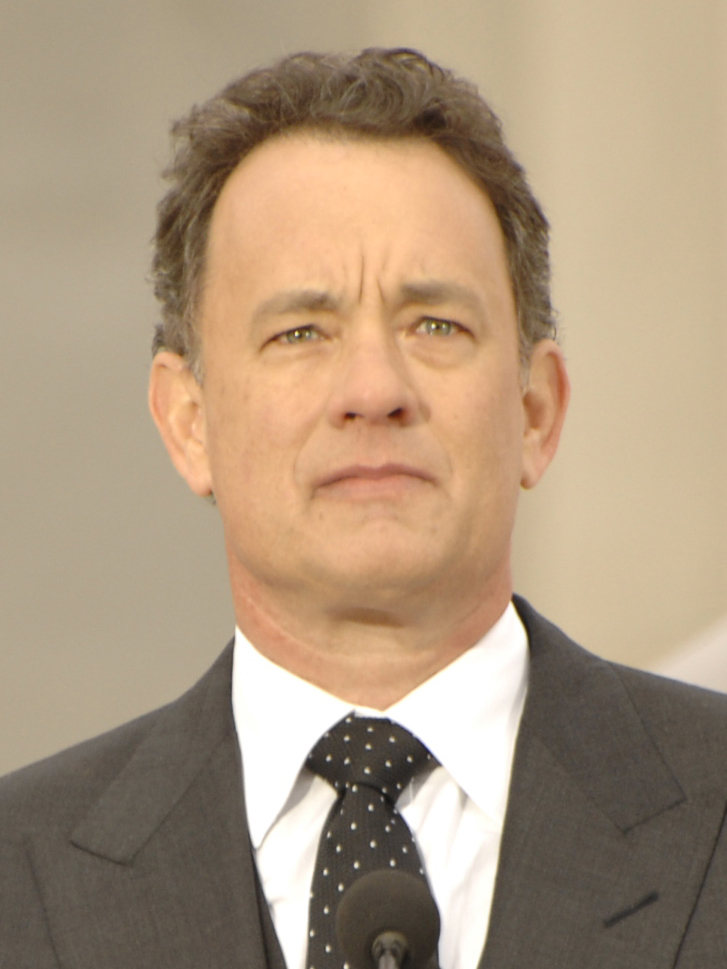
Tom Hanks (pictured in 2009) appeared in six different roles in the film.

- Tom Hanks as:
  - James the Conductor
  - Christopher (adult narration and motion-capture)
  - Hobo
  - Ebenezer Scrooge puppet
  - Santa Claus
  - Father
- Daryl Sabara as Christopher (child voice)
  - Josh Hutcherson as Christopher (additional motion-capture)
- Nona Gaye as Holly
  - Darrian O Driscoll as Holly (additional motion-capture)
  - Meagan Moore as Holly (singing voice)
  - Tinashe as Holly (motion-capture model)
- Peter Scolari as Billy (motion-capture)
  - Hayden McFarland as Billy (additional motion-capture)
  - Jimmy Bennett as Billy (speaking voice)
  - Matthew Hall as Billy (singing voice)
- Eddie Deezen as Lenny
  - Jimmy Pinchak as Lenny (additional motion-capture)
- Michael Jeter as Smokey and Steamer (voice)
  - André Sogliuzzo as Smokey and Steamer (additional voice) (Note: Jeter died during the film's production, before he had recorded all of his lines, requiring Sogliuzzo to take over and re-record most of the dialogue for consistency. However, Jeter's voice can still be heard voicing the characters during the caribou scene.)
- Leslie Zemeckis as Sarah (motion-capture) and Mother
  - Isabella Peregrina as Sarah (voice)
  - Ashly Holloway as Sarah (additional motion-capture)
- Dylan Cash as Boy on Train (voice)
- Brendan King and Andy Pellick as Pastry Chefs
- Josh Eli, Rolandas Hendricks, Jon Scott, Sean Scott, Mark Mendonca, Mark Goodman, Gregory Gast, and Gordon Hart as Waiters
- Julene Renee as Red Head Girl and an Elf
- Chris Coppola as Toothless Boy and an Elf
  - Connor Matheus as Toothless Boy (additional motion-capture)
- Phil Fondacaro, Debbie Lee Carrington, Mark Povinelli, and Ed Gale as Elves
- Charles Fleischer as Elf General
- Steven Tyler as Elf Lieutenant and Elf Singer

== Production ==
=== Development and filming ===
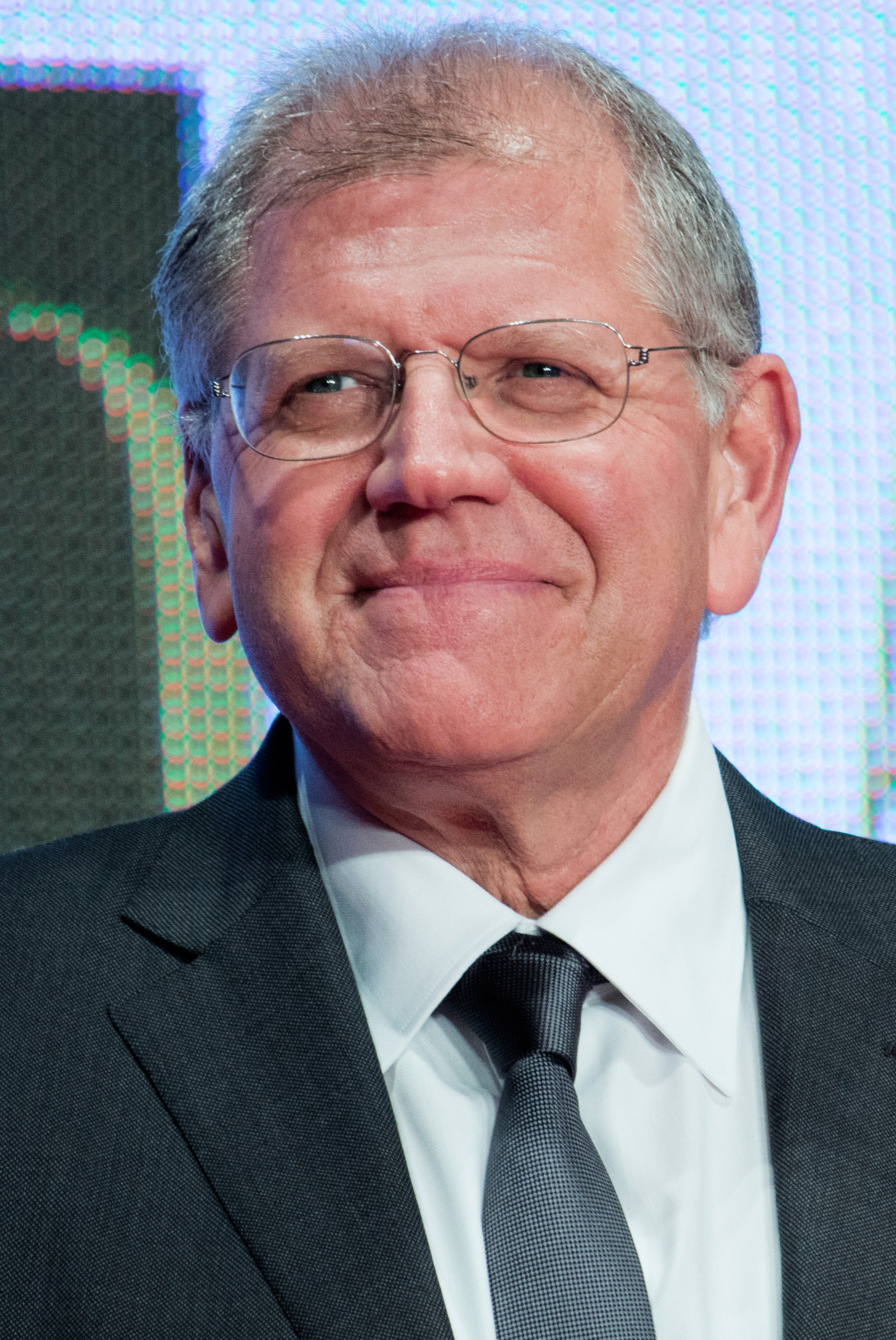
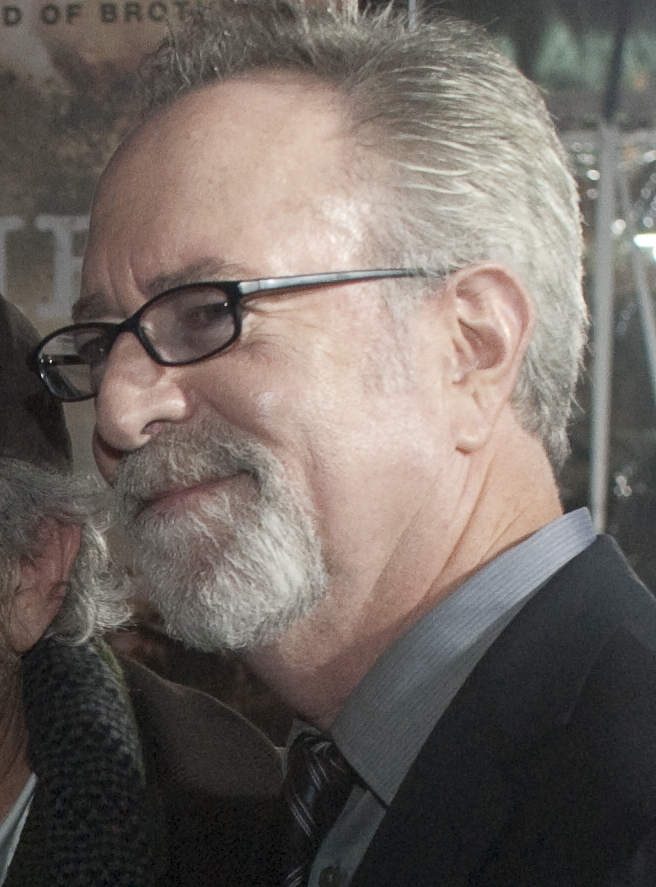
Director/co-writer/co-producer Robert Zemeckis (left) and co-producer Gary Goetzman (right).

Tom Hanks optioned the film in 1999 after reading the book to his children with the hopes of playing James the Conductor and Santa Claus. The book's author, Chris Van Allsburg, had been unwilling to sell the rights to the book for a film adaptation but changed his mind after learning of Hanks' involvement. Castle Rock Entertainment subsequently made a "seven-figure commitment" to co-produce the film with Hanks's company Playtone, Van Allsburg and William Teitler in March 2000. One of the conditions of the sale was that the resulting film not be animated, as Van Allsburg feared this would not accurately represent his characters. Rob Reiner was originally hired as director, and the film was originally scheduled to be released in December 2001.

After the film was repeatedly postponed, Robert Zemeckis was hired to replace Reiner as director and co-producer in February 2002. Zemeckis and screenwriter William Broyles Jr. subsequently rewrote the film. Zemeckis and Broyles' new draft expanded the roles of minor characters such as Holly, Lenny and Billy, and added the new character of Hobo. The Scrooge puppet was inspired by Zemeckis considering his childhood toys, one of which was a puppet. After Zemeckis's company ImageMovers's contract with DreamWorks Pictures expired, he made a new deal with Warner Bros. Pictures to fund, distribute and provide studio space for the film.

Despite Van Allsburg's original terms with Hanks, Zemeckis felt that a live-action version was unfeasible, claiming that it "would look awful, and it would be impossible – it would cost $1 billion instead of $160 million". Zemeckis felt that such a version would rob the audience of the art style of the book which he felt was "so much a part of the emotion of the story". However, Zemeckis also agreed that a conventional animated version would suit the film poorly. To keep his vision a new process was created by which actors would be filmed with motion capture equipment in a black box stage which would then be animated to make the resulting film. Hanks stated that this method of working was "actually a return to a type of acting that acting in films does not allow you to do", comparing the process to performing a play in the round. The decision to film in motion capture necessitated another studio to co-produce, as the process was expensive and cost $1 million per minute of footage. After Universal Studios turned down the opportunity, investor Steve Bing agreed to finance half of the film's budget through his company Shangri-La Entertainment, which had only produced one other film. Executives at Warner Bros. were nervous about the film's technology and whether audiences would accept it.

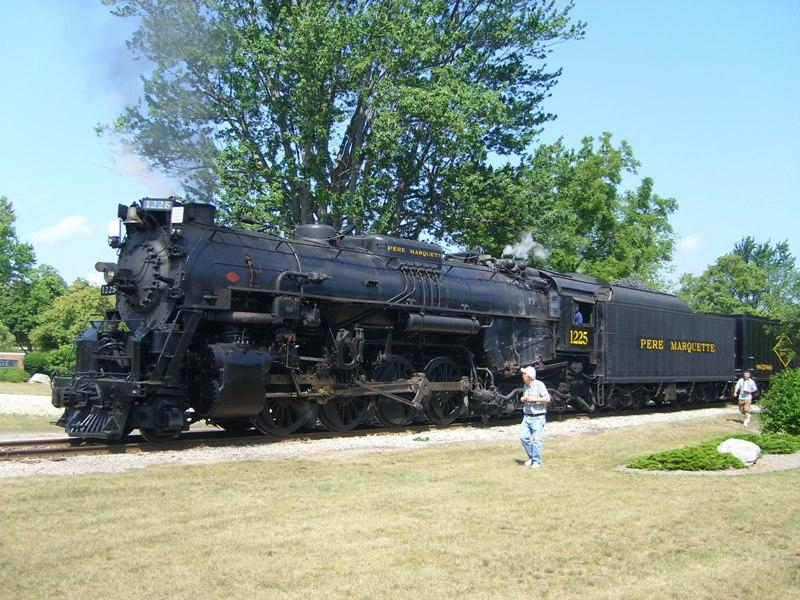
Pere Marquette 1225, the basis for the Polar Express locomotive

The engine featured in the film was modeled after drawings of the Pere Marquette 1225. In July 2002, Warner Bros. approached its owner, the Steam Railroading Institute, to study it. The Steam Railroading Institute's executive director Dennis Braid provided several assets for the film, including a bulb and valve gear from the engine, and a box of coal. Sounds from the engine were also recorded for the film.

Principal production of the film began in June 2003 at Warner Bros. Studios, Burbank, and wrapped in May 2004.

Hanks plays six roles in the film, including that of the main character (whose voice would later be dubbed in by Daryl Sabara). Initially, Zemeckis considered having him play every role, but after trying this, Hanks grew exhausted, and they whittled down the number.

The only two characters in the film to not be animated through motion capture were Smokey and Steamer, mainly because of the huge size discrepancy and their more caricature nature compared to the rest of the cast. Ultimately, the characters were animated traditionally with skeletal animation rigs. A deleted scene on the home media release has the engineer and fireman characters explain through a shadow puppet show that the Hobo is the ghost of a homeless person who was killed while riding on the top of the train. The film was Michael Jeter's last film performance, as he died on March 30, 2003, before he could finish recording his lines as the engineer and fireman. Following his death, André Sogliuzzo was brought in to record the characters' remaining dialogue, as well as re-dub most of Jeter's already recorded dialogue (except for Steamer during the caribou scene).

=== Soundtrack ===
The soundtrack album of the film, titled The Polar Express: Original Motion Picture Soundtrack, was released on November 2, 2004, by Reprise Records, Warner Music Group and Warner Sunset Records. The song, "Believe" was written by Alan Silvestri (music) and Glen Ballard (lyrics), and was nominated for Best Original Song at the 77th Academy Awards. It was sung at the 77th Academy Awards show by original performer Josh Groban with Beyoncé and won a Grammy Award in 2006.

The album was certified Gold by the RIAA in November 2007. Having sold 724,000 copies in the United States, it is the best-selling film soundtrack/holiday album hybrid since Nielsen SoundScan started tracking music sales in 1991.

Most of the original orchestral score featured in the film was not released on the soundtrack and has never been released. The soundtrack mostly comprises only songs featured in the film. A limited number of promotional "For Your Consideration" CDs, intended to showcase the film's score to reviewers of the film, were released in 2005. This CD contained nearly the complete score, but none of the film's songs. Various bootleg versions of the soundtrack, combining both the official soundtrack album and the orchestral-only CD, have since surfaced.

=== Architecture ===
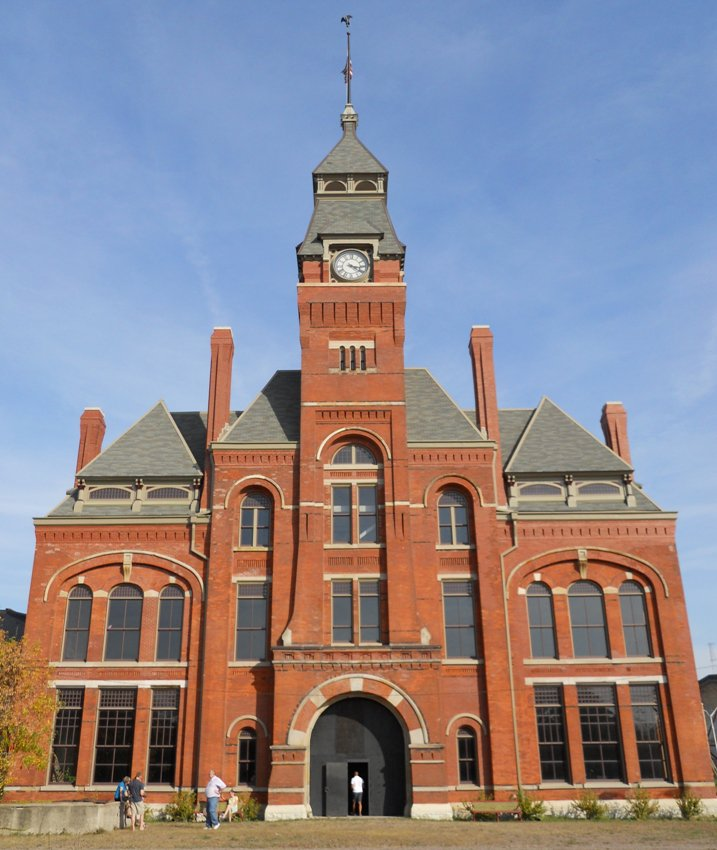
Administration building of the Pullman Palace Car Company

The buildings at the North Pole in the film represent an earlier era in American railroading. Building design drew inspiration from the Pullman neighborhood in Chicago, home of a railroad car manufacturer, the Pullman Company.

== Marketing ==
=== Video game ===
A video game based on the film was released on November 2, 2004, for GameCube, Game Boy Advance, PlayStation 2 and Windows, developed by Blue Tongue Entertainment and published by THQ. The plot of the game is somewhat different than the film version. Within the game, the Ebenezer Scrooge puppet—who is set as the main antagonist of the game—attempts to prevent the children from believing in Santa Claus by stealing their tickets and trying to prevent the children from making it to the North Pole.

=== Merchandise ===
Model railroad manufacturer Lionel produces a variety of Polar Express train sets and equipment, including locomotives, train cars, and trackside buildings. Most of these are in O scale, running on Lionel's 3-rail track, but they also produce an HO scale version, an S scale American Flyer version, and a simplified plastic toy version that runs on G scale (or #1 gauge) track. In all of these sets, the locomotive model is based on the film rather than the real 1225 and thus incorporates the cosmetic changes made for the film (such as the longer cowcatcher and recessed headlight housing).

Before the film was released, Bachmann, another major model train manufacturer, also sold a G scale Polar Express train set based on the book. Apart from the paint scheme, this set made no effort to resemble the book illustrations and used the same 4-6-0 locomotive and open-platform passenger cars as most of Bachmann's other G scale train sets. Bachmann's G scale 4-6-0 is based on ET&WNC "Tweetsie" #12, a narrow-gauge locomotive that looks very different from Pere Marquette 1225. This set was discontinued before the release of the film.

Various manufacturers have produced look-alike train sets based on the Polar Express, but as these are not officially licensed, they can't use the name. A typical example is Bachmann's more recent HO scale "North Pole Express", which includes a 2-6-2 locomotive (their existing USRA 0-6-0 model with pilot and trailing trucks added) and two passenger cars in a Polar Express-inspired paint scheme. Bachmann also produces an HO scale model of Pere Marquette 1225, but it is not available in Polar Express livery.

Brio has produced several wooden Polar Express train sets for small children – some unpowered, others with a battery-operated locomotive. Although both locomotives were based on existing Brio products, the Polar Express versions were given center-mounted headlights to loosely suggest the appearance of Pere Marquette 1225. Instead of black, they were painted dark blue to resemble the color palette of the film. Both sets have since been discontinued.

=== Train trips ===
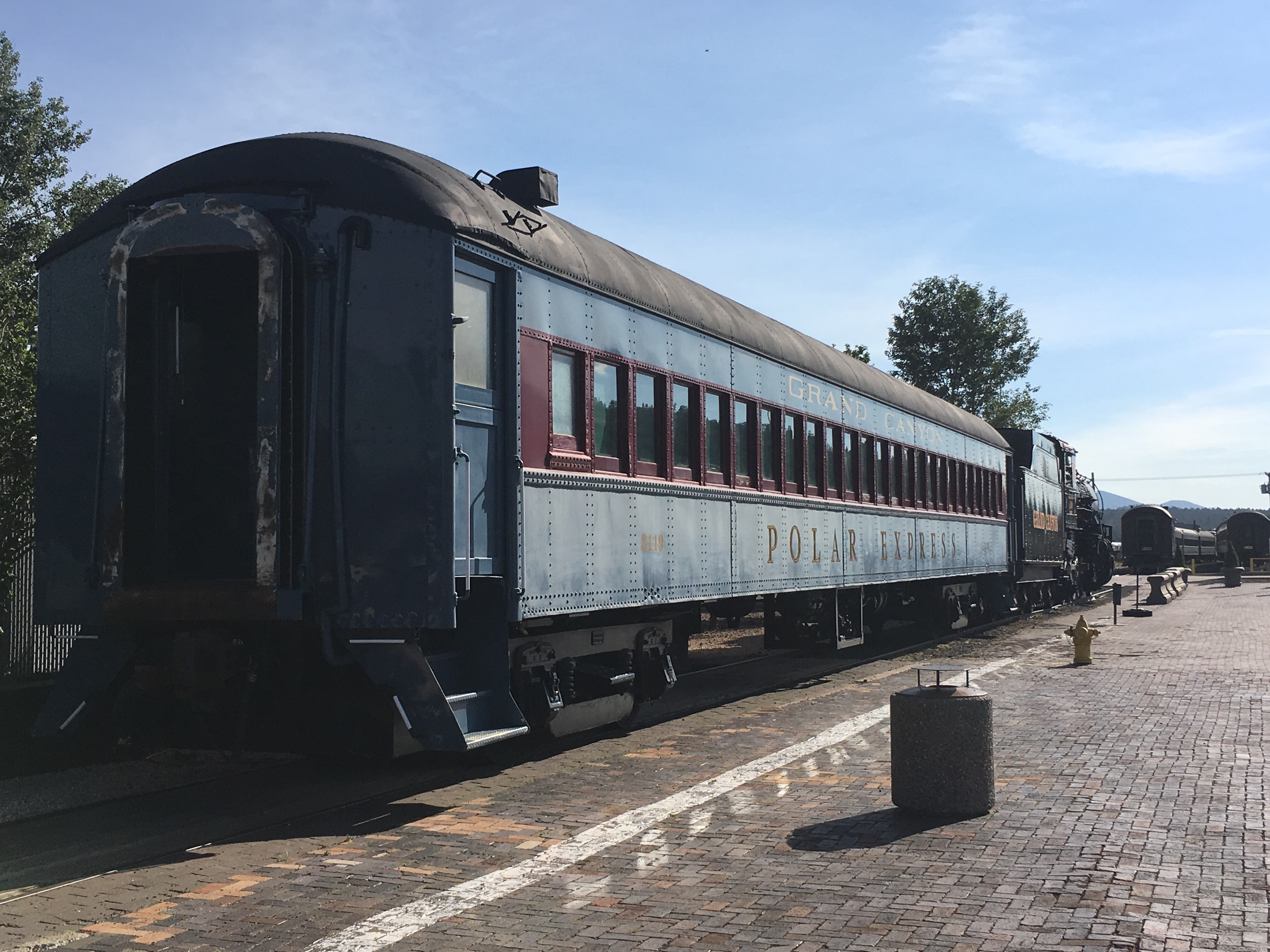
A Grand Canyon Railway passenger car with Polar Express livery

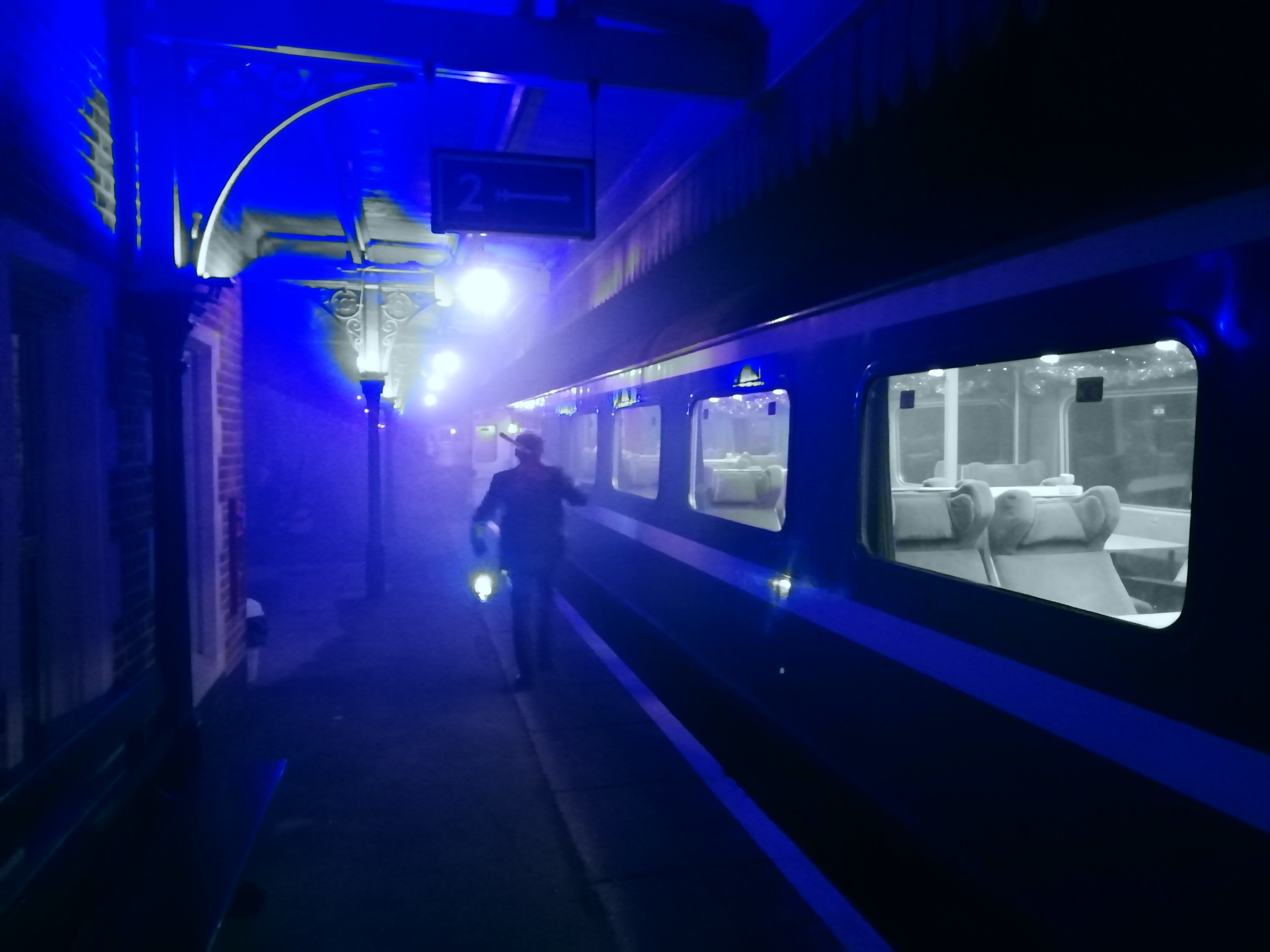
Polar Express train on the Mid-Norfolk Railway, UK, in 2019

The film has also spawned multiple real-world holiday train-travel experiences based loosely on its train journey all over the United States, as well as Canada, and even the United Kingdom under license from Rail Events Inc. These include the Polar Express train rides held at the Grand Canyon Railway, Great Smoky Mountains Railroad, Texas State Railroad, Whippany Railway Museum, Aspen Crossing, and the Maine Narrow Gauge Railroad, among others. The 1225 itself pulls a similarly themed Christmas train, albeit under the name of the North Pole Express.

The UK's first Polar Express train rides were hosted on the Dartmoor Railway and the Weardale Railway, which were both owned by the company British American Railway Services. These services were all diesel hauled, however in 2016, Telford Steam Railway became the first UK line to run the Polar Express with steam, powered by two American-built S160 2-8-0 locomotives, Nos. 5197 and 6046, loaned from the Churnet Valley Railway in Staffordshire. PNP Events Ltd. operates Polar Express rides in Oxfordshire (Cholsey and Wallingford Railway), the Yorkshire Dales (Wensleydale Railway), South Devon (South Devon Railway), Royal Tunbridge Wells (Spa Valley Railway) and Edinburgh Waverley (on the UK mainline network). Polar Express rides also operates on the Mid-Norfolk Railway, and the Seaton Tramway operate the "Polar Express Tram Ride". Alongside the steam operated Polar Express trains run at numerous heritage railways in the UK, Vintage Trains have run Polar Express trains with Great Western 4-6-0 Hall class No. 4965 Rood Ashton Hall, No. 5043 Earl of Mount Edgcumbe and No. 7029 Clun Castle. These trains run between Birmingham Moor Street and Dorridge.

=== Concert presentations ===
In 2021, CineConcerts in partnership with Warner Bros. Consumer Products presented The Polar Express in Concert, being symphony hall showings of the movie backed by a live symphony orchestra and choir.

=== The Polar Express Experience ===
In November 2007, SeaWorld Orlando debuted the Polar Express Experience, a motion simulator ride based on the film. The attraction was a temporary replacement for the Wild Arctic attraction. The building housing the attraction was also temporarily re-themed to a railroad station and ride vehicles painted to resemble Polar Express passenger cars. The plot for the ride revolves around a trip to the North Pole on Christmas Eve. Guests feel the motion of the locomotive as well as the swinging of the train on ice and feeling of ice crumbling beneath them. The attraction was available until January 1, 2008, and was open annually during the Christmas season. 2015 was the final year of operation for the Polar Express Experience and Wild Arctic was operated on a year-round schedule until 2021.

The 4D film, distributed by SimEx-Iwerks, has been shown at other amusement parks around the world including Cincinnati Zoo and Botanical Garden, Stone Mountain, Dollywood (during the annual Smoky Mountain Christmas event), Vancouver Aquarium (2009–2010).

== Release ==
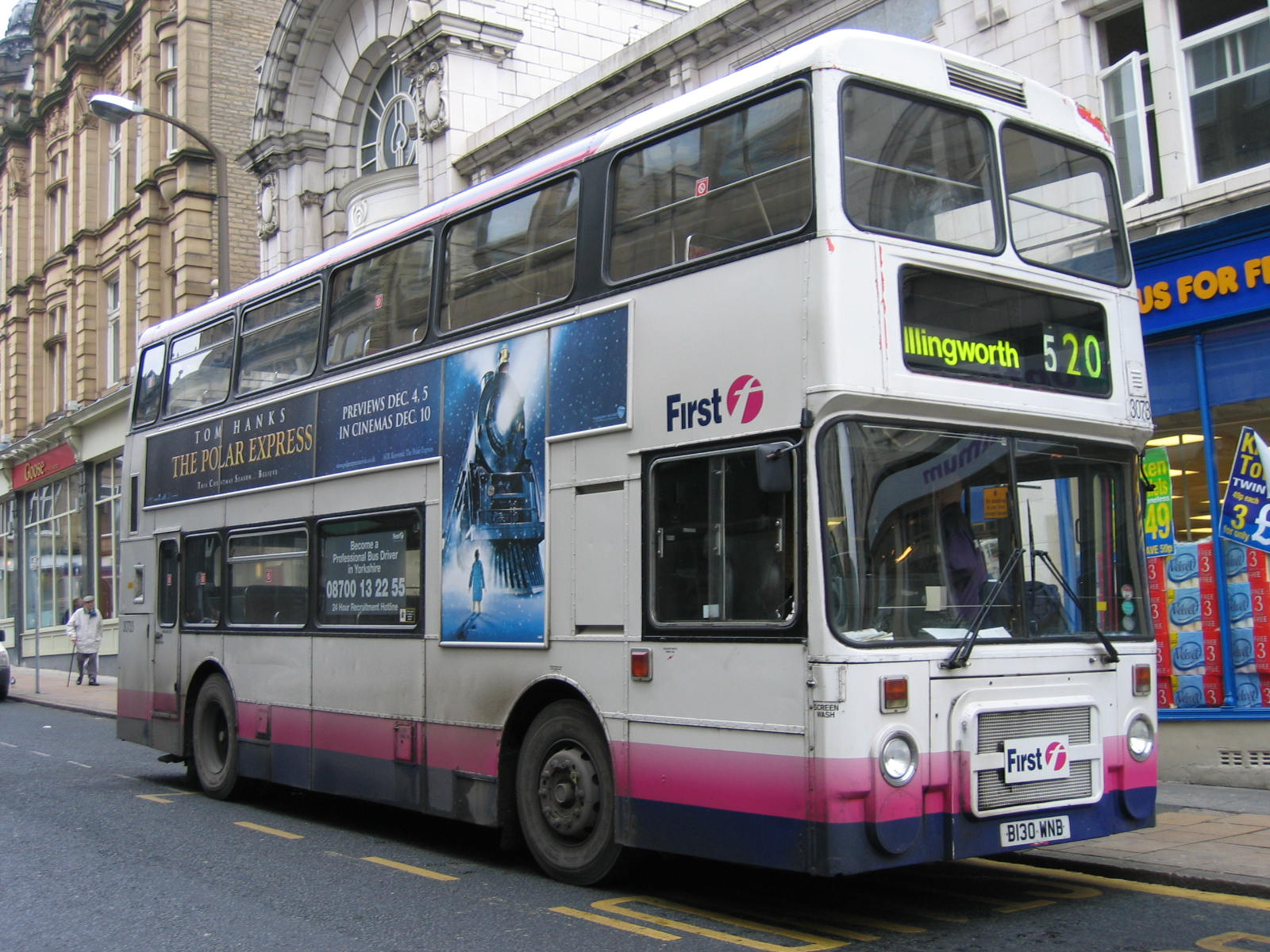
A bus advertising the film in England

=== Theatrical ===
The film premiered at the 40th Chicago International Film Festival on October 21, 2004. It opened on November 7 and went into wide distribution on November 10. In addition to standard theatrical 35mm format, a 3D version for IMAX was also released, generated from the same CGI digital models used for the 2D version.

=== Home media ===
One year after theatrical release, the film was released on DVD in widescreen and full-screen versions as single and two-disc special editions (with bonus features), as well as on VHS, on November 22, 2005. It was released on HD-DVD with bonus features in 2006 and on Blu-ray with bonus features on October 30, 2007, both presented in the original widescreen aspect ratio. It was also released in Anaglyph 3D Blu-ray and DVD on October 28, 2008, labeled as "The Polar Express: Presented in 3-D". This version includes an Anaglyph Version of the Film and the Original Theatrical Presentation. The film was later released to Blu-ray 3D on November 16, 2010, and to Ultra HD Blu-ray on November 1, 2022.

== Reception ==
=== Box office ===
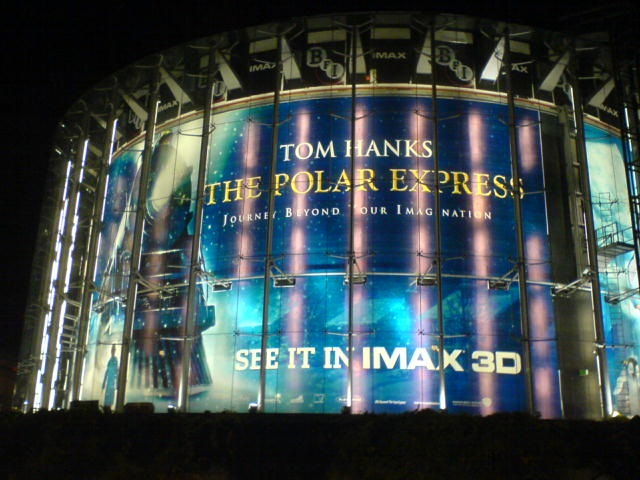
Promotion for the IMAX version of The Polar Express in 2006

The film opened in second place behind The Incredibles, earning $23.3 million from approximately 7,000 screens at 3,650 theaters, for a per-theater average of $6,390 and a per-screen average of $3,332 in its opening weekend. It also brought in a total of $30.6 million since its Wednesday launch. The weekend total also included $2.1 million from 59 IMAX theaters, for an IMAX theater average of $35,593, and had a $3,000,000 take since Wednesday. According to president Dan Fellman, Titanic had put a different spin on the numbers for The Polar Express. Among holiday movies, The Santa Clause 2 opened in 2002 to $29 million and grossed $140 million, while Elf debuted the next year at $31 million on its way to a $175-million take. The studio had high hopes for the movie, particularly since Zemeckis and Hanks had a history of success with Forrest Gump and Cast Away.

Since Harry Potter and the Sorcerer's Stone was released in 2001, Warner Bros. Pictures had released 10 major films and all of them had dropped off at least 36% in their second weekend, but only seven dropped off at least 49%. Not one of them had a lower three-day opening weekend total gross as The Polar Express itself. The overseas prospects for the film were not especially encouraging, even though The Last Samurai went on to make a considerable sum of money across the globe and was prematurely labeled a flop by the media. In its second weekend, The Polar Express dropped to 33%, and grossing $15.7 million, averaging $4,293 from 3,650 venues and boosting the 12-day cumulative gross to $51.5 million. In its third weekend, which was Thanksgiving weekend, the film increased by 24%, earning $19.4 million, averaging $5,312 from 3,650 venues and raising the 19-day cumulative gross to $81.5 million. With a total gross of $71 million, The Polar Express would hold the record for having the highest IMAX gross of any film until it was taken by Avatar five years later in 2009. The film has made $191 million in North America, and $137.8 million overseas for a total worldwide gross of $329 million (including all re-releases).

=== Critical response ===
The Polar Express received divided reviews from critics upon release, with some calling it an "instant Christmas classic" and others criticizing the characters as "lifeless zombies". On the review aggregator website Rotten Tomatoes, 55% of 210 critics' reviews are positive, with an average rating of 6.40/10. The website's consensus reads: "Though the movie is visually stunning overall, the animation for the human characters isn't lifelike enough, and the story is padded." Metacritic, which uses a weighted average, assigned the film a score of 61 out of 100, based on 36 critics, indicating "generally favorable" reviews. The Independent reported in 2011 that the film "is now seen by many as a classic". Audiences polled by CinemaScore gave the film a rare average grade of "A+" on an A+ to F scale.

Roger Ebert gave the film his highest rating of four stars, writing of its: "deeper, shivery tone, instead of the mindless jolliness of the usual Christmas movie" and "haunting, magical quality". Acknowledging comments by other reviewers, Ebert said, "It's a little creepy. Not creepy in an unpleasant way, but in that sneaky, teasing way that lets you know eerie things could happen ... This one creates a world of its own, like The Wizard of Oz or Willy Wonka and the Chocolate Factory, in which the wise child does not feel too complacent." Richard Roeper and Mick LaSalle also gave highly positive reviews to the film, with the former saying that it "remains true to the book, right down to the bittersweet final image" and the latter giving it his highest rating of five stars, calling it, "an enchanting, beautiful and brilliantly imagined film that constitutes a technological breakthrough". James Berardinelli gave the film 3.5 out of 4 stars, stating that it is "a delightful tale guaranteed to enthrall viewers of all ages", and ranked it as the 10th best film of 2004, tying with The Incredibles. Ian Nathan of Empire gave the film 3 out of 5 stars, and said, "For all the fairy-lit wonder, some will rail at the idea of Back to the Future's director dabbling with such a schmaltzy tale. Cynics will sneeze in shock; children will cuddle up and dream along." Peter Bradshaw of The Guardian also gave the film 3 out of 5 stars, saying, "After a promising and distinctive start, a railway adventure to meet Santa runs off the rails."

The film's character animation was criticized by some critics for dipping into the uncanny valley, as it was thought to falter in mimicking realistic facial expressions and emotions. Peter Travers of Rolling Stone gave the film 1 star out of 4, and called it "a failed and lifeless experiment in which everything goes wrong". Stephanie Zacharek of Salon gave the film 1.5 stars out of 5 and said, "I could probably have tolerated the incessant jitteriness of The Polar Express if the look of it didn't give me the creeps." Geoff Pevere of the Toronto Star stated, "If I were a child, I'd have nightmares. Come to think of it, I did anyway." Paul Clinton from CNN called it "at best disconcerting, and at worst, a wee bit horrifying". Manohla Dargis of The New York Times gave the film 1.5 stars out of 5 and wrote, "There's no way of knowing whether they drank the company Kool-Aid. Still, from the looks of The Polar Express it's clear that, together with Mr. Zemeckis, this talented gang has on some fundamental level lost touch with the human aspect of film."

=== Accolades ===
In 2008, the American Film Institute nominated The Polar Express for its Top 10 Animated Films list.

Award	Date of ceremony	Category	Recipient(s)	Result	Ref.
AARP Movies for Grownups Awards	2005	Best Movie for Grownups Who Refuse to Grow Up	The Polar Express	Nominated	
Academy Awards	February 27, 2005	Best Sound Editing	Randy Thom and Dennis Leonard	Nominated	
Academy Awards	February 27, 2005	Best Sound Mixing	Randy Thom, Tom Johnson, Dennis S. Sands and William B. Kaplan	Nominated	
Academy Awards	February 27, 2005	Best Original Song	Glen Ballard and Alan Silvestri for "Believe" by Josh Groban	Nominated	
ASCAP Awards	2005	Top Box Office Films	Alan Silvestri	Won	
Annie Awards	January 30, 2005	Animated Effects	Matt Hausman	Nominated	
Awards Circuit Community Awards	2004	Best Animated Feature	The Polar Express	Nominated	
Bambi Awards	2004	Film - International	Tom Hanks	Won	
British Academy Children's Awards	2005	Best Feature Film	Steve Starkey and Robert Zemeckis	Nominated	
Critics' Choice Movie Awards	January 10, 2005	Best Animated Feature	The Polar Express	Nominated	
Critics' Choice Movie Awards	January 10, 2005	Best Song	Josh Groban for "Believe"	Nominated	
Gold Derby Awards	2005	Animated Feature	The Polar Express	Nominated	
Golden Globe Awards	January 16, 2005	Best Original Song	Glen Ballard and Alan Silvestri for "Believe" by Josh Groban	Nominated	
Golden Reel Awards	2005	Best Sound Editing in Feature Film - Animated	The sound editing team	Nominated	
Golden Schmoes Awards	2004	Best Animated Movie of the Year	The Polar Express	Nominated	
Grammy Awards	February 8, 2006	Best Song Written for a Motion Picture, Television or Other Visual Media	Glen Ballard and Alan Silvestri for "Believe" by Josh Groban	Won	
International Film Music Critics Association Awards	2004	Best Original Score for a Fantasy/Science Fiction Film	Alan Silvestri	Nominated	
International Online Cinema Awards	2005	Best Animated Feature	Robert Zemeckis	Nominated	
Online Film & Television Association Awards	2005	Best Animated Picture	Gary Goetzman, Steve Starkey, William Teitler and Robert Zemeckis	Nominated	
People's Choice Awards	January 9, 2005	Favorite Animated Movie	The Polar Express	Nominated	
Satellite Awards	January 23, 2005	Best Motion Picture, Animated or Mixed Media	The Polar Express	Nominated	
Satellite Awards	January 23, 2005	Best Original Song	Glen Ballard and Alan Silvestri for "Believe"	Nominated	
Saturn Awards	May 3, 2005	Best Animated Film	The Polar Express	Nominated	
Saturn Awards	May 3, 2005	Best Music	Alan Silvestri	Nominated	
Stinkers Bad Movie Awards	2005	Worst Song or Song Performance in a Film or Its End Credits	"Hot Chocolate" by Tom Hanks	Nominated	
Stinkers Bad Movie Awards	2005	Worst Christmas Film	The Polar Express (Warner Bros.)	Nominated	
Visual Effects Society	February 16, 2005	Outstanding Performance by an Animated Character in an Animated Motion Picture	Michael Jeter, David Schaub, Renato Dos Anjos and Roger Vizard for the Steamer character	Nominated	
World Soundtrack Awards	October 15, 2005	Best Original Song Written for Film	Glen Ballard, Alan Silvestri and Josh Groban for "Believe"	Nominated	
Young Artist Awards	April 30, 2005	Outstanding Young Ensemble in a New Medium	The young motion performance capture and voice artists	Won	
Young Artist Awards	April 30, 2005	Jackie Coogan Award	The Polar Express	Won	

== Sequel ==
Producer Gary Goetzman revealed in a January 2024 interview with ComicBook.com that a sequel to The Polar Express was being "worked out", indicating the project may have entered development. It is unclear how far along the project is or if it has any chance of being greenlit.

== See also ==
- List of Christmas films
- Santa Claus in film
