= Portland Company Marine Complex =

Coordinates: 43.66289°N 70.2438°W

The Portland Company Marine Complex is a 9-acre (3.6 ha) industrial site in the East End neighborhood of Portland, Maine, United States. The Portland Company was established in 1846 and built railroad equipment for the adjacent Portland terminus of the Atlantic and St. Lawrence Railroad connection between Portland and Montreal. It ceased production in 1978. In August 2013, the property was sold to a group of developers. At the time of its sale, the property had a tax-assessed value of $1.9 million. Since 1993, the building has been home to the Maine Narrow Gauge Railroad Museum as well as host to the Maine Boat Show and Maine Flower Show.
