= Bad Day at Riverbend =

Book by Chris Van Allsburg

- Cover
- Author: Chris Van Allsburg
- Illustrator: Chris Van Allsburg
- Genre: Children's literature
- Publisher: Houghton Mifflin Harcourt Publishing Company
- Publication date: 1995
- Publication place: United States
- Media type: Print (hardcover)
- Preceded by: The Sweetest Fig
- Followed by: Zathura

Bad Day at Riverbend is a 1995 children's book written by American writer Chris Van Allsburg.

== Plot ==
At first, the book takes a different format than Chris Van Allburg’s usual style, in black and white. On a quiet day at the Western town of Riverbend, local sheriff Ned Hardy sees a bright light across the hill. Soon after, he hears that a colorful slime is covering many animals. When he heads out to investigate, he finds the local stagecoach driver covered in this mass and unable to speak. Upon returning to Riverbend, he finds it too covered in the slime. The citizens say that it appeared after the light. Distraught but unwilling to surrender, Hardy heads on towards where the light came from with his men. They find a large stick man-like figure in the mountain and deem him as the culprit. However, just as they charge, Hardy and his men are covered in the substance and are unable to move or speak.

Suddenly, a hand and crayon in Van Allsburg's art style appears. It is then revealed that the strange matter was none other than crayon scribbles, and that Sheriff Hardy and Riverbend are part of a coloring book owned by a small boy who loves cowboys. The book ends saying that the light went out as the boy is shown leaving, indicating that the light was in fact a lamp.
