= The Wreck of the Zephyr =

1983 picture book by Chris Van Allsburg

- Author: Chris Van Allsburg
- Illustrator: Chris Van Allsburg
- Cover artist: Chris Van Allsburg
- Language: English
- Genre: Children's, fantasy novel
- Publisher: Houghton Mifflin
- Publication date: 1983
- Publication place: United States
- Media type: Print (hardcover)
- Pages: 31
- ISBN: 978-1849395434
- Preceded by: Ben's Dream
- Followed by: The Mysteries of Harris Burdick

The Wreck of the Zephyr is a children's book written and illustrated by the American author Chris Van Allsburg, first published by Houghton Mifflin in March 1983.

== Plot ==
While exploring the seaside clifftop near a small fishing village, the narrator comes upon the wreck of a small wooden sailboat. A weathered old man is sitting near the wreck, and the narrator asks him how the boat came to be there, so far from the water. The old man begins to tell the story of a young boy who, years ago, was the most talented sailor in the harbor, never missing an opportunity to prove it, performing feats that none of the grown men would dare try.

One day the boy decided to go out despite the storm brewing just outside the harbor and against the warnings of an old fisherman. As he sails out of the harbor, a big gust strikes the boat and the strong waves knock him unconscious. When the boy recovers, he finds himself and the boat (the Zephyr) stranded on a strange beach far above shore. He searches for help and after a long time crests a hill to see the Zephyr being towed by two boats floating through the air. From the hilltop the boy watches the two strange boats deposit the Zephyr in the harbor.

Back in the harbor, he encounters a fisherman who, surprised at the boy's return, tells him that they do not get any visitors because the island is surrounded by a treacherous reef. He offers to take the boy home but the boy refuses, saying he will not leave before learning how to sail above the waves. The fisherman gives the boy a special set of sails for the Zephyr and spends all day trying to teach him, but the boy repeatedly fails to accomplish the task. The fisherman gives up and takes the boy home, where his wife has prepared dinner.

Once the fisherman and his wife are asleep, the boy sneaks out to the Zephyr for another try. This time he succeeds. By the light of the full moon the boy navigates out of the harbor and sets a course for home.

As he nears his village, he aims to ring the high church bell, letting everyone know that he truly is the greatest sailor ever. But just as he passes over the steeple, the wind dies, sending the Zephyr plummeting. The boy heads back for the safety of the harbor, but cannot make it and crashes into the cliff, destroying the Zephyr. He badly breaks his leg.

Afterward, the old man claims, the townspeople never believed him, and the boy spent his life doing odd jobs and searching for the mysterious island. The old man ends the tale by commenting that the breeze looks just right for a sail as he limps back down toward the harbor, suggesting that the old man is the boy from the story.

== Fritz ==
As in all of Van Allsburg's stories, Fritz the Dog is hidden in this book. He can be found on page nine, standing near the fisherman as he warns the boy against taking the boat out into the rough storm.

== Film adaptation ==
As of 2020, Paramount had purchased the film rights but due to the COVID-19 pandemic the production has been delayed.
