= The Garden of Abdul Gasazi =

1979 picture book by Chris Van Allsburg

- Author: Chris Van Allsburg
- Illustrator: Chris Van Allsburg
- Genre: Children's picture book
- Publisher: Houghton Mifflin
- Publication date: June 21, 1979
- Publication place: United States
- Media type: Print
- ISBN: 0-395-27804-X
- Followed by: Jumanji

The Garden of Abdul Gasazi is a best-selling children's picture book written in 1979 by the American author Chris Van Allsburg. The Garden of Abdul Gasazi was the first book written by Van Allsburg, for which he won a Caldecott Honor in 1980.

== Plot summary ==
Miss Hester's dog Fritz had bitten her cousin Eunice six times, so when Miss Hester receives an invitation to visit Eunice, she is not surprised to read "P.S. Please leave your dog home". Before leaving for her visit, Miss Hester asks Alan Mitz to dog sit Fritz and give him his afternoon walk. Alan does an admirable job of making sure Fritz does not destroy the house furniture with his sharp teeth.

However, while walking the dog, he comes upon a sign forbidding dogs into the garden of Abdul Gasazi, the retired magician. Alan takes the warning quite seriously and turns to leave, but Fritz tugs and snaps his way out of his collar and runs into the garden. Alan chases the dog all over the garden and almost catches Fritz. But after Alan falls down a flight of steps, Fritz disappears. While looking for Fritz, Alan notices that his pawprints lead the way to the House of Gasazi. Once Alan arrives at the mansion-sized house, Mr. Gasazi invites him in. Alan politely asks Mr. Gasazi to please give Fritz back. At first, Gasazi smiles and seems to grant Alan's request by saying "Certainly you may have your little Fritzie. Follow me."

While walking across the front lawn, Gasazi reveals that when he sees dogs digging up his flowers and chewing on his trees in the garden, he turns them into ducks. When one duck comes towards Alan, Gasazi tells him to take Fritz (who is now a duck) home and throws him out. As Alan's traveling home, a strong gust of wind lifts his hat off his head. Fritz flies out of his reach and grabs the hat in mid-air, but keeps on flying into the clouds. As Alan cries on his way home, he wonders how he will tell Miss Hester the bad news.

To his surprise, when he finally gets back to her house, Fritz is there, apparently fine. Alan, relieved by the good news, waves goodbye to Miss Hester and goes home. But when Miss Hester calls out to Fritz, the dog comes up the front steps while chewing on Alan's hat and drops it at her feet. Miss Hester says, "Why you bad dog! What are you doing with Alan's hat?"

== Development ==
Fritz was based on a bull terrier Chris Van Allsburg's brother-in-law owned named Winston. Soon after Jumanji was published, Winston died after getting hit by a car. After that, van Allsburg decided to put a cameo of Fritz in all of his books as a tribute to Winston.

== Film adaptation ==
Walt Disney Pictures and 20th Century Fox acquired the film rights for The Garden of Abdul Gasazi in May 2019. Darren Lemke was hired for the screenplay, with Mike Weber, Bill Teitler and Ted Field in producer's role and Van Allsburg acting as executive producer.
