= Chris Van Allsburg =

American writer and illustrator (born 1949)

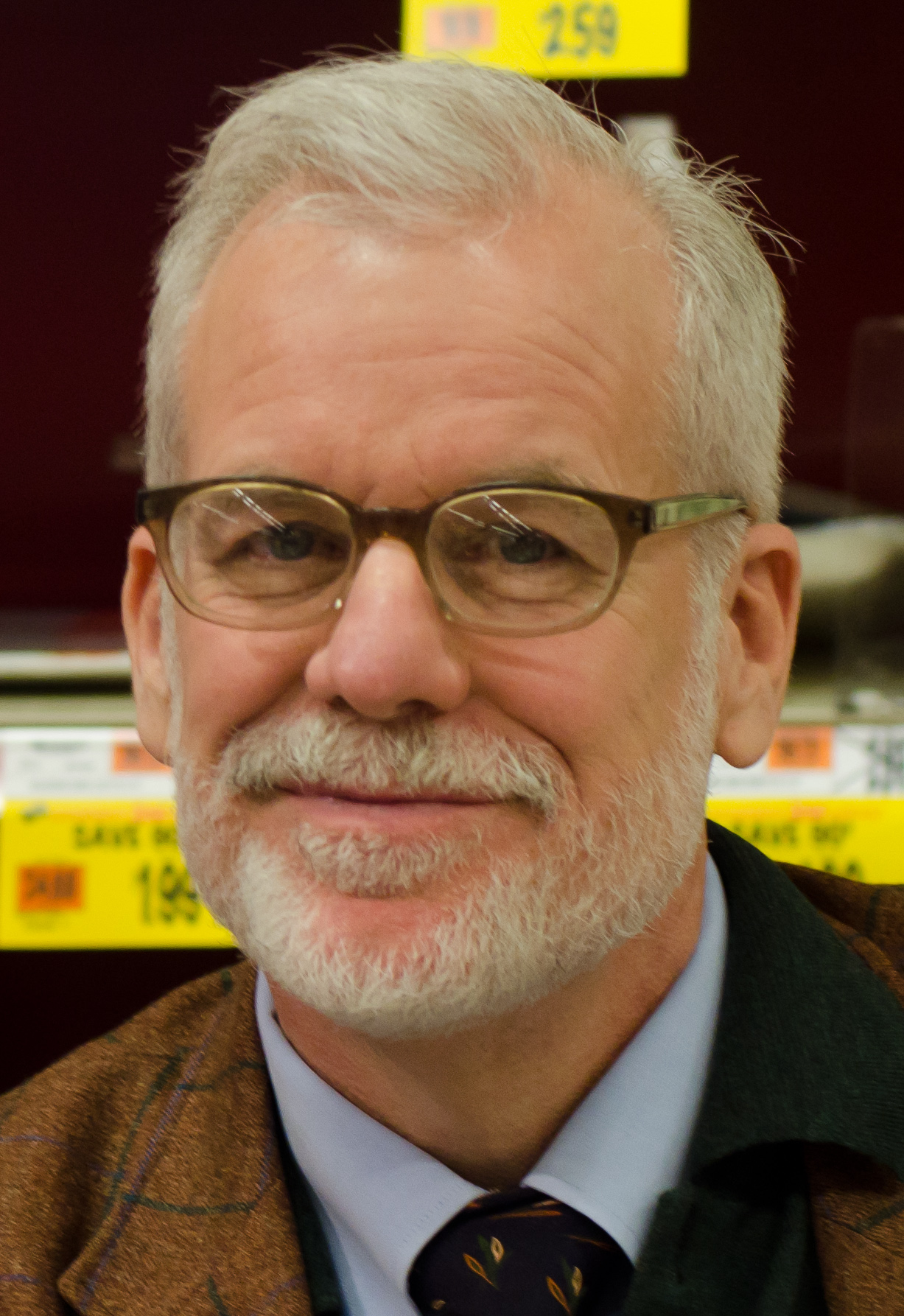
- Van Allsburg in 2011
- Born: June 18, 1949 (age 77); Grand Rapids, Michigan, U.S.
- Education: University of Michigan; Rhode Island School of Design
- Occupations: Writer, illustrator
- Spouse: Lisa Van Allsburg (m. 1974)
- Children: 2
- Writing career
- Genre: Children's picture books
- Notable works: The Garden of Abdul Gasazi; Jumanji; The Mysteries of Harris Burdick; The Widow's Broom; The Polar Express; Zathura
- Notable awards: Caldecott Medal; 1982, 1986
- Website: chris-van-allsburg.harpercollins.com/home

Chris Van Allsburg (born June 18, 1949) is an American writer and illustrator of children's books. He has won two Caldecott Medals for U.S. picture book illustration, for Jumanji (1981) and The Polar Express (1985), both of which he also wrote, and were later adapted as successful motion pictures. He was also a Caldecott runner-up in 1980 for The Garden of Abdul Gasazi. For his contribution as a children's illustrator, he was a 1986 U.S. nominee for the biennial International Hans Christian Andersen Award, the highest international recognition for creators of children's books. He received the honorary degree of Doctor of Humane Letters from the University of Michigan in April 2012.

== Life and career ==
Van Allsburg was born on June 18, 1949, to a Dutch family in Grand Rapids, Michigan, the second child of Doris Christianen and Richard Van Allsburg. He has an older sister named Karen, born in 1947.

Van Allsburg attended the College of Architecture and Design at the University of Michigan, which at that time included an art school. He majored in sculpture, learning bronze casting, wood carving, resin molding, and other techniques.

Van Allsburg graduated from the University of Michigan in 1972 and continued his education at the Rhode Island School of Design (RISD), graduating with a master's degree in sculpture in 1975. After graduation, Van Allsburg set up a sculpture studio.

Van Allsburg struggled for a time with his sculpture studio. At home, Van Allsburg began a series of sketches that his wife Lisa thought would be suitable for children's books. She showed his work to an editor who contracted his first book, The Garden of Abdul Gasazi, in 1979.

As of 2022, Van Allsburg has written and/or illustrated 21 books. His art has also been featured on the covers of an edition of C. S. Lewis's series The Chronicles of Narnia, published by HarperCollins in 1994, as well as in three children's books written by Mark Helprin.

== Personal life ==
Van Allsburg lives in Providence, Rhode Island, with his wife Lisa. They have two daughters, Sophia and Anna. Upon marrying his wife, Van Allsburg converted to Judaism, the latter's faith.

== Awards ==
- Caldecott Medals for Jumanji (1981) and The Polar Express (1985)
- Boston Globe–Horn Book Award (for Illustration) The Garden of Abdul Gasazi (1980)
- National Book Award (Finalist for Children's Picture Books) for Jumanji (1982)
- Regina Medal a literary award conferred annually by the Catholic Library Association (1993)
- Society of Illustrators Original Art Lifetime Achievement Award (2009)

== Works ==
Picture children's books:

- The Garden of Abdul Gasazi (1979), a Caldecott runner-up
- Jumanji (1981), a Caldecott Medal winner
- Ben's Dream (1982)
- The Wreck of the Zephyr (1983)
- The Mysteries of Harris Burdick (1984)
- The Polar Express (1985), a Caldecott Medal winner
- The Stranger (1986)
- The Z Was Zapped (1987)
- Two Bad Ants (1988)
- Just a Dream (1990)
- The Wretched Stone (1991)
- The Widow's Broom (1992)
- The Sweetest Fig (1993)
- Bad Day at Riverbend (1995)
- Zathura (2002)
- Probuditi! (2006)
- Queen of the Falls (2011)
- The Misadventures of Sweetie Pie (2014)

Other books:

- Swan Lake (1989) Illustrator, written by Mark Helprin
- A City in Winter (1996) Illustrator, written by Mark Helprin
- The Veil of Snows (1997) Illustrator, written by Mark Helprin
- The Chronicles of Harris Burdick: Fourteen Amazing Authors Tell the Tales (2011) Editor, with Lois Lowry, Kate DiCamillo, M. T. Anderson, Louis Sachar, Stephen King, Tabitha King, Jon Scieszka, Sherman Alexie, Gregory Maguire, Cory Doctorow, Jules Feiffer, Linda Sue Park and Walter Dean Myers

== Filmography ==
- The Little Mermaid (1989), visual development artist
- Jumanji (1995), screen story writer
- How to Deal (2003), executive producer
- The Polar Express (2004), executive producer
