= Lucky Jim (2003 film) =

- Genre: Comedy
- Based on: Lucky Jim by Kingsley Amis
- Written by: Jack Rosenthal
- Directed by: Robin Sheppard
- Starring: Stephen Tompkinson; Robert Hardy; Keeley Hawes
- Composer: Mark Russell
- Country of origin: United Kingdom
- Original language: English

Production
- Running time: 104 minutes
- Production company: Working Title Television

Original release
- Network: ITV
- Release: 11 April 2003

Lucky Jim is a 2003 British television comedy film directed by Robin Sheppard and starring Stephen Tompkinson, Robert Hardy and Keeley Hawes. It is the third television adaptation of the 1954 novel Lucky Jim by Kingsley Amis, following Further Adventures of Lucky Jim and The Further Adventures of Lucky Jim.

== Cast ==
- Stephen Tompkinson as Jim Dixon
- Robert Hardy as Professor Neddy Welch
- David Ryall as Stanley
- Helen McCrory as Margaret Peel
- Anthony Calf as Cecil Goldsmith
- Hugh Parker as Alfred Beesley
- Robert Wilfort as Evan Johns
- Tim Wylton as Mr. Wilson
- Ursula Jones as Mrs. Cutler
- Penelope Wilton as Celia Welch
- Stephen Mangan as Bertrand Welch
- Keeley Hawes as Christine Callaghan
- Hermione Norris as Carol Goldsmith
- Anthony Smee as Mr. Pringle
- Denis Lawson as Julius Gore-Urqhart
- Ian Lindsay as Bus Conductor
- Dorian Lough as Taxi Driver
- Rick Warden as Mr. Catchpole

== Bibliography ==
- Sandbrook, Dominic (2015). The Great British Dream Factory: The Strange History of Our National Imagination. London: Penguin. ISBN 978-0-241-00465-4.
