= In Deep (TV series) =

British crime drama series (2001–2003)

- Genre: Crime drama
- Created by: Peter Jukes
- Directed by: Colin Bucksey; Paul Marcus; Roberto Bangura; Martin Hutchings
- Starring: Nick Berry; Stephen Tompkinson; Lisa Maxwell; Karianne Henderson; Buster Reece
- Composers: Joe Campbell; Paul Hart
- Country of origin: United Kingdom
- Original language: English
- No. of series: 3
- No. of episodes: 22 (list of episodes)

Production
- Executive producers: John Yorke; Mal Young
- Producer: Steve Lanning
- Cinematography: Peter Sinclair; Howard Baker
- Editor: Jake Lanning
- Running time: 60 minutes
- Production company: Valentine Productions

Original release
- Network: BBC One
- Release: 19 February 2001 – 4 March 2003

In Deep is British crime drama series created by Peter Jukes, starring Nick Berry and Stephen Tompkinson as undercover detectives Liam Ketman and Garth O'Hanlon.

Three series, comprising a total of twenty-two episodes, aired on BBC One between 19 February 2001 and 4 March 2003. A complete box set containing all three series was released on 9 July 2012.

== Plot ==
Initial press releases of In Deep stated that "life as an undercover detective is demanding. One slip-up can result in disaster, something that Liam Ketman (Nick Berry) and Garth O Hanlon (Stephen Tompkinson) know only too well. The pressure of leading complicated double lives means that sacrifices must be made for the job and the impact on their personal lives is immense." Liam Ketman is described as a family man whose marriage is under strain because of his job as an undercover detective. Garth O'Hanlon is described as a character apparently devoid of emotional or family entanglements who deals with often extreme violence as part of his job.

Actor Stephen Tompkinson said of the series: "In Deep is a very gritty drama and not the kind of thing that I'm normally associated with. I think if the audience are expecting Ballykissangel or Grafters they're in for a surprise. This is not just another police show; it was seat of the pants stuff for us and the dramatic possibilities are endless." Tompkinson also commented on the work of real life undercover police officers: "There are only about 30 of these officers in this country, and they've got no fixed abode and no safety net when things go wrong, and it's terrifying really. They're always acting, pretending to be somebody else, and I found that fascinating that here was a real job with lives at risk, but where they act all the time. So In Deep is sort of a drama within a drama."

Tompkinson was forced to change his appearance radically for every episode to suit each individual undercover persona. While researching material for the series, writer Peter Jukes spent several weeks with real-life undercover police officers that infiltrate hard-core criminal operations, in order to find out what life is really like for them. The first series was shot over the course of thirteen weeks in and around London.

== Cast ==
- Nick Berry as Liam Ketman, detective sergeant
- Stephen Tompkinson as Garth O'Hanlon, detective constable
- Lisa Maxwell as Pamela Ketman, Liam's wife (series 1–2)
- Karianne Henderson as Nicola Ketman, Liam's daughter (series 1–3)
- Buster Reece as Max Ketman, Liam's son (series 1–3)
- Meera Syal as Dr. Marta Drusic, police psychologist (series 1)
- Fiona Allen as Dr. Sophie Masterson, police psychologist (series 2–3)
- Vincenzo Pellegrino as Chris O'Hanlon, Garth's brother (series 2)
- Carli Norris as Kelly Jensen, detective constable (series 2)
- Kate Williams as Rose, Liam's mother-in-law (series 3)

== Episode list ==
=== Series overview ===
- Series 1: 19 February 2001 to 6 March 2001 (6 episodes)
- Series 2: 7 January 2002 to 29 January 2002 (8 episodes)
- Series 3: 10 February 2003 to 4 March 2003 (8 episodes)

=== Series 1 (2001) ===
No.	Title	Directed by	Written by	Viewers (millions)	Original release date
1	"Blue on Blue – Part 1"	Peter Jukes	Roberto Bangura	7.76	19 February 2001
Garth goes undercover as a security consultant to track down Eva Richardson, the mind behind a powerful vice ring. He uncovers a link with the drug squad and, after one of Eva's girls is discovered dead in suspicious circumstances, an internal investigation is launched. This results in Liam being posted back to investigate his old drug squad colleagues. Attempting to infiltrate the web of corruption, Garth sets up a drugs deal. But, when this goes disastrously wrong, it becomes clear that someone of high rank is playing for the opposition.
2	"Blue on Blue – Part 2"	Peter Jukes	Roberto Bangura	7.24	20 February 2001
Liam's allegiances are put to the test when it becomes apparent that his old friend, senior officer Craig Griffin, is also in on the deal. Garth must race against time to find a key witness held captive by two corrupt policemen.
3	"Romeo Trap – Part 1"	Peter Jukes	Paul Marcus	7.00	26 February 2001
Liam and Garth try to crack a child sex ring that is operating through a sophisticated website. Liam befriends the wife of the webmaster and Garth goes undercover in prison to make contact with two of the principal players. After winning their confidence, he discovers that a grisly crime is about to be committed.
4	"Romeo Trap – Part 2"	Peter Jukes	Paul Marcus	7.41	27 February 2001
Garth and Liam know the identity of the mastermind behind the child sex ring, but the problem is getting hard evidence. Liam attempts to get to him through his wife.
5	"Ghost Squad – Part 1"	Peter Jukes	Colin Bucksey	6.33	5 March 2001
Liam infiltrates a white supremacist group, which has begun a systematic petrol tanker bombing campaign. Garth is assigned to provide backup and support to Liam's family, but, when a vengeful man – whose imprisonment Garth was responsible for – tracks him down, he finds instead that his presence is putting them in mortal danger.
6	"Ghost Squad – Part 2"	Peter Jukes	Colin Bucksey	7.14	6 March 2001
Liam discovers that the leader of the white supremacist group is not who he seems. An unwelcome visitor from Garth's past mistakes Liam's family for Garth's – and sets out to exact his revenge on the man whose evidence put him in prison.

=== Series 2 (2002) ===
No.	Title	Directed by	Written by	Viewers (millions)	Original release date
1	"Untouched – Part 1"	Peter Jukes	Colin Bucksey	6.92	7 January 2002
Liam and Garth pose as drug dealers in a bid to capture Jamie Lamb, the country's biggest cocaine importer. They infiltrate his trusted entourage and fit in so well that, when Lamb's wife leaves him taking his two daughters with her, he asks Liam and Garth to kill her and bring back proof in exchange for a shipment of cocaine.
2	"Untouched – Part 2"	Peter Jukes	Colin Bucksey	6.45	8 January 2002
Kelly persuades Tania Lamb to help them fake her murder. However, when the "proof" is taken back to Jamie, he turns nasty and ups the stakes, declaring that the deal is not complete until his daughters have been returned to him. Liam and Garth are forced to use Lamb's daughters as insurance to make sure the exchange of drugs takes place. In a fit of guilt, Tania calls Jamie and unwittingly exposes Garth and Liam's set-up leaving them cornered with no back-up.
3	"Jekylls – Part 1"	Stephen Brady	Colin Bucksey	6.22	14 January 2002
When DCI Mark Holland is killed in a drive-by shooting, his colleagues suspect local crime kingpin Charlie Pearce of being behind the murder. In order to investigate, Liam, Garth and Kelly are sent undercover posing as importers of fake watches and a possible target for Pearce's protection racket.
4	"Jekylls – Part 2"	Stephen Brady	Colin Bucksey	6.09	15 January 2002
Garth is in a critical condition after being shot by David Pearce. Liam is determined to get revenge, but has to balance his emotions as he tries to find out who was behind the murder of DCI Holland and the attempt on Charlie Pearce's life.
5	"Blood Loss – Part 1"	Peter Jukes	Martin Hutchings	5.93	21 January 2002
When Fiona Waddington's teenage daughter and young son are kidnapped, a ransom is sent to her family's publishing company. As the kidnappers don't want the police involved, Liam and Garth have to pose as kidnap and ransom specialists.
6	"Blood Loss – Part 2"	Peter Jukes	Martin Hutchings	5.53	22 January 2002
After the botched exchange, Garth is being held by the kidnappers and Liam is off the case owing to concerns over his personal life. The kidnappers send new demands, but Clayton Waddington is unwilling to meet them.
7	"Abuse of Trust – Part 1"	Peter Jukes	Paul Marcus	4.85	28 January 2002
A killer is targeting the members of a dating site. The team work to draw out potential suspects under the guidance of a criminal profiler. Meanwhile, Liam's involvement with an obsessive estate agent leads to his relationship with his ex-wife and children becoming even more fraught.
8	"Abuse of Trust – Part 2"	Peter Jukes	Paul Marcus	5.49	29 January 2002
Another murder has been committed. Garth is sent undercover to befriend key suspect Grendel. The team become concerned when Dr Winterbourne works out a pattern to the killings, which suggests that Liam's ex-wife, Pamela, is a potential victim.

=== Series 3 (2003) ===
No.	Title	Directed by	Written by	Viewers (millions)	Original release date
1	"Full Disclosure – Part 1"	Peter Jukes	Paul Marcus	6.93	10 February 2003
Liam returns to duty after the shooting and aids in the capture of crazed armed robber Sean Denning. However, Denning is released on bail so Liam and Garth have to return undercover as he searches for those who gave him up to the police. Garth, meanwhile, becomes increasingly concerned by Liam's fatalistic behaviour.
2	"Full Disclosure – Part 2"	Peter Jukes	Paul Marcus	TBA	11 February 2003
After Sophie's assault, her phone and notes are missing, leaving Liam and Garth at risk as they continue to try to gather new evidence against Denning. Their task is complicated by a malcontent ex-policeman working with the defence team trying to find undercover operatives.
3	"Queen and Country – Part 1"	Stephen Brady	Colin Bucksey	TBA	17 February 2003
Liam and Garth are called in by the Ministry of Defence to infiltrate a group of disgruntled former undercover soldiers planning a campaign of terror. Sent undercover to Liverpool, Garth takes the opportunity to reconnect with an old flame.
4	"Queen and Country – Part 2"	Stephen Brady	Colin Bucksey	TBA	18 February 2003
The base of the group Liam and Garth are infiltrating has been attacked by a group of ex-IRA men pursuing vengeance. The shoot-out tips Garth over the edge and he flees. With one of the men being suspicious of Garth, Liam has to find him.
5	"Men and Boys – Part 1"	Stephen Leather	Colin Bucksey	TBA	24 February 2003
Liam and Garth are sent undercover to a maximum security prison as the case against villain Vincent Hunter looks set to collapse. He is co-ordinating the targeting of witnesses and the destruction of evidence from inside. Liam tries to gain his trust by posing as a fellow prisoner, while Garth operates as a prison officer to find out which officer is aiding Hunter.
6	"Men and Boys – Part 2"	Stephen Leather	Colin Bucksey	TBA	25 February 2003
Garth realises one of DCI Davies's team is working with Hunter and forms a strategy to identify the culprit before they get to key witness undercover cop Debbie. Meanwhile, Liam is concerned when he learns Max is in trouble with the police after being targeted by bullies.
7	"Character Assassins – Part 1"	Peter Jukes	Paul Marcus	5.81	4 March 2003
Government minister Jeremy Church is about to give a speech announcing the government's intention to legalise cannabis. The controversial policy has made Church a target and Liam and Garth are sent undercover to the conference venue to prevent a potential assassination. With a £1-million price on the minister's head, even his Special Branch bodyguards are potential suspects.
8	"Character Assassins – Part 2"	Peter Jukes	Paul Marcus	TBA	4 March 2003
Garth has been released following the murder of Dominic and is furious with Liam following his failure to back him up. Meanwhile, Nicola tries to help boyfriend Josh when he is left £9,000 in debt to drug dealers after Garth stole his drugs and Liam gets closer to hotelier Gina.
