= Lucky Jim =

1954 novel by Kingsley Amis

- First US edition
- Author: Kingsley Amis
- Cover artist: Edward Gorey
- Language: English
- Publisher: Doubleday (US); Victor Gollancz (UK)
- Publication date: January 1954
- Publication place: England
- Pages: 256
- OCLC: 30438025
- LC Class: 54-5356

Lucky Jim is a novel by Kingsley Amis, first published in 1954 by Victor Gollancz. It was Amis's first novel and won the 1955 Somerset Maugham Award for fiction. The novel follows the academic and romantic tribulations of the eponymous James (Jim) Dixon, a reluctant history lecturer at an unnamed provincial English university.

Amis arrived at Dixon's surname from 12 Dixon Drive, Leicester, the address of Philip Larkin from 1948 to 1950, while he was a librarian at the university there. Lucky Jim is dedicated to Larkin, who helped to inspire the main character and contributed significantly to the structure of the novel.

== Plot ==
Jim Dixon is a lecturer in medieval history at a red brick university in the English Midlands. He has made an unsure start and, towards the end of the academic year, is concerned about losing his probationary position in the department. In his attempt to be awarded a permanent post he tries to maintain a good relationship with his absent-minded head of department, Professor Welch. To establish his credentials he must also ensure the publication of his first scholarly article, but he eventually discovers that the editor to whom he submitted it has translated it into Italian and passed it off as his own.

Dixon struggles with an on-again off-again "girlfriend", Margaret Peel, a fellow lecturer who is recovering from a suicide attempt in the wake of a broken relationship with another man and implies she might make another attempt if Dixon leaves her. Margaret employs emotional blackmail to appeal to Dixon's sense of duty and pity while keeping him in an ambiguous and sexless limbo. While she is staying with Professor Welch, he holds a musical weekend that seems to offer an opportunity for Dixon to advance his standing among his colleagues. The attempt goes wrong, however, and the drunken Dixon drops a lighted cigarette on the bed, burning a hole in the sheets.

During the same weekend Dixon meets Christine Callaghan, a young Londoner and the latest girlfriend of Professor Welch's son, Bertrand, an amateur painter whose affectedness particularly infuriates Dixon. After a bad start Dixon realises that he is attracted to Christine, who is far less pretentious than she initially appears.

Dixon's growing closeness to Christine upsets Bertrand, who is using her to reach her well-connected Scottish uncle, Julius Gore-Urquhart, and get a job from him. Then Dixon rescues Christine from the university's annual dance after Bertrand treats her offhandedly, and takes her home in a taxi. The pair kiss and make a date for later, but Christine admits that she feels guilty about seeing Dixon behind Bertrand's back and about Dixon's supposed relationship with Margaret. The two decide not to see each other again, but when Bertrand calls on Dixon to "warn him off the grass" he cannot resist the temptation to quarrel with Bertrand, until they fight.

The novel reaches its climax during Dixon's public lecture on "Merrie England". Having attempted to calm his nerves by drinking too much, partially at the urging of Gore-Urquhart, he caps his uncertain performance by angrily mocking and denouncing the university culture of arty pretentiousness and passes out. Welch lets Dixon know privately that his employment will not be extended, but Gore-Urquhart offers Dixon the coveted job of assisting him in London. Later Dixon meets Margaret's ex-boyfriend, who reveals that he had not been her fiancé, as she had claimed. Comparing notes, the two realise that the suicide attempt was faked as a piece of neurotic emotional blackmail.

Feeling free of Margaret at last, Dixon responds to Christine's phoned request to see her off as she leaves for London. There he learns from her that she is leaving Bertrand after being told that he was having an affair with the wife of one of Dixon's former colleagues. They decide to leave for London together and then walk off arm in arm, outraging the Welches as they pass on the street.

== Literary significance and legacy ==
When originally published, Lucky Jim received enthusiastic reviews. In the New Statesman, Walter Allen wrote, "Mr Amis has an unwaveringly merciless eye for the bogus: some aspects of provincial culture – the madrigals and recorders of Professor Welch, for instance – are pinned down as accurately as they have ever been; and he has, too, an eye for character – the female lecturer Margaret, who battens neurotically on Jim's pity, is quite horribly well done. Mr Amis is a novelist of formidable and uncomfortable talent."

W. Somerset Maugham praised Amis' writing while disdaining the new generation he represented: "Mr. Kingsley Amis is so talented, his observation is so keen, that you cannot fail to be convinced that the young men he so brilliantly describes truly represent the class with which his novel is concerned... They have no manners, and are woefully unable to deal with any social predicament. Their idea of a celebration is to go to a public bar and drink six beers. They are mean, malicious and envious... They are scum."

In response to Maugham's criticism of the new generation, the New Statesman and The Nation held contests to get readers to respond to Maugham in the voice of Jim Dixon.

Retrospective reviews have solidified its legacy as one of Amis' finest novels. Christopher Hitchens described it as the funniest book of the second half of the 20th century, writing: "Lucky Jim illustrates a crucial human difference between the little guy and the small man. And Dixon, like his creator, was no clown but a man of feeling after all."

Olivia Laing, writing in The Guardian: "Remarkable for its relentless skewering of artifice and pretension, Lucky Jim also contains some of the finest comic set pieces in the language."

Margaret Drabble, although defending Monica Jones, Philip Larkin's paramour, against Amis's caricature of her in Lucky Jim, wrote in the New Statesman that "Monica as Margaret Peel, a needy, dowdy academic spinster, was the version that first lodged in my consciousness, as a scarecrow alarming enough to warn any woman off the academic life".

Adam Gopnik, writing in The New Yorker, wrote that the vacant Professor Welch was at least partially modelled on Oxford professor J. R. R. Tolkien, who his students, Amis and Larkin, had found to be tedious and almost unintelligible.

Time magazine included Lucky Jim in its TIME 100 Best English-language Novels from 1923 to 2005.

== Film and television adaptations ==
In the 1957 British film adaptation, Jim Dixon was played by Ian Carmichael. Keith Barron starred in Further Adventures of Lucky Jim, a 1967 seven-episode BBC TV series based on the character and set in the "swinging London" of 1967. This was followed by The Further Adventures of Lucky Jim in 1982, but with Enn Reitel as Jim. In 2003, ITV aired a remake of Lucky Jim with Stephen Tompkinson playing the central character.
