= Stephen Tompkinson =

English actor

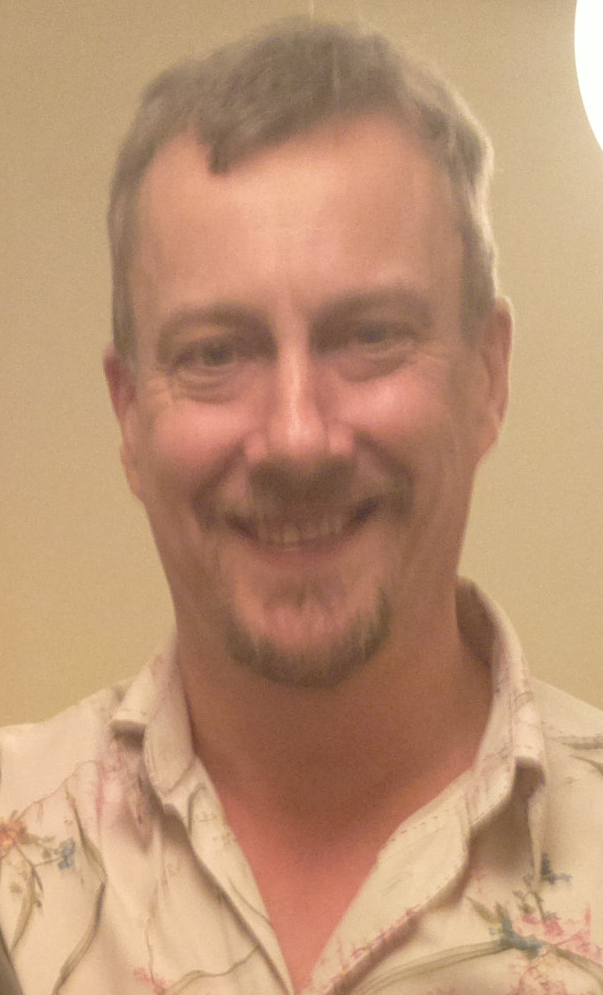
- Tompkinson in 2013
- Born: Stephen Phillip Tompkinson; 15 October 1965 (age 61); Stockton-on-Tees, County Durham, England
- Education: Central School of Speech and Drama
- Occupation: Actor
- Years active: 1987–present
- Known for: DCI Banks; Wild at Heart; Grafters; Brassed Off; Ballykissangel; Drop the Dead Donkey; Trollied
- Spouse(s): Celia Anastasia (divorced); Nicci Taylor (divorced 2006); Elaine Young (2007–2016)
- Partner: Jessica Johnson (2017–2021)
- Children: 1

Stephen Phillip Tompkinson (born 15 October 1965) is an English actor, known for his television roles as Marcus in Chancer (1990), Damien Day in Drop the Dead Donkey (1990–1998), Father Peter Clifford in Ballykissangel (1996–98), Trevor Purvis in Grafters (1998–1999), Danny Trevanion in Wild at Heart (2006–2013) and the titular Alan Banks in DCI Banks (2010–2016). He won the 1994 British Comedy Award for Best TV Comedy Actor. He also starred in the films Brassed Off (1996) and Hotel Splendide (2000).

== Early life ==
Tompkinson was born in Stockton-on-Tees. When he was about age 4, his family moved to Scarborough, North Riding of Yorkshire and then to Lytham St Annes, Lancashire, where he grew up and attended St Bede's Roman Catholic High School in Lytham and St Mary's Sixth Form in Blackpool. Tompkinson's first lead was as a red admiral butterfly in The Plotters of Cabbage Patch Corner.

He went on to train at the Central School of Speech and Drama in London, alongside James Nesbitt and Rufus Sewell, and graduated in 1988. Tompkinson's acting career began straight out of drama school. During his last year at the London School of Speech and Drama he won the 1987 Carleton Hobbs Bursary, gaining a contract as a member of the BBC's Radio Drama Company, and had roles in radio dramas.

Along with Ewan Bailey, he performed a two-part radio drama titled Say What You Want to Hear (Swywth), written by Tim Wright and broadcast in 2010 on BBC Radio 4. His narrated radio documentaries include Brass Britain, which aired in 2008 and was reprised in 2010 on BBC Radio 2.

== Career ==
=== Television ===
==== 1980s ====
In 1988, Tompkinson appeared with Ken Goodwin and Freddie Davies in a Channel 4 short titled Treacle, directed by Peter Chelsom. It received a 1988 BAFTA nomination in the category of Best Short Film.

During the next few years he was cast in several single-episode parts on All at No 20, Shelley, After Henry, Casualty, Made in Heaven, and Boon. He also played in three episodes of The Manageress (1989).

Also in 1989 he appeared in his first full-length made-for-TV movie. Based on a 1977 play by C.P. Taylor, And a Nightingale Sang was a romantic comedy-drama adapted for television by Jack Rosenthal.

==== 1990s ====
He was cast in three episodes of Tales of Sherwood Forest (1989), nine episodes of Chancer (1990), and nine episodes of Minder (1991) It received the 1990 Prix Europa Special award for the film in the category "TV Fiction". Between 1990 and 1998, Tompkinson starred in 66 episodes of the satirical comedy Drop the Dead Donkey. He played the ambitious but unethical reporter Damien Day, and won the 1994 British Comedy Awards "Best TV Comedy Actor" award.

In 1994, he was Private Simon 'Spock' Matlock, a history teacher and intellectual in BBC comedy drama All Quiet on the Preston Front, written by Tim Firth and set in Lancashire. Alistair McGowan replaced him after the first series because Tompkinson had other commitments. That same year he was in Downwardly Mobile – a Yorkshire Television sitcom about a group of Yuppies – aired for one season but failed to make an impression and was not recommissioned.

From 1996 to 1998 he portrayed, in the popular Ballykissangel, the struggles of a young English Roman Catholic priest assigned as curate to a church in Ireland's 'back of beyond'. In 1998 he starred as Jim Harper in the three-part ITV psychological thriller Oktober, about a naive English teacher at a posh school in Switzerland. His character becomes a guinea pig in the trials of a new mind-altering drug. Tompkinson performed his own stunts. He says that "I grabbed this project because I'd never been asked to do anything like this before. And the chance to do stunts was one reason it was so appealing."

Also in 1998, and again in 1999, he co-starred with Robson Green in two series of Grafters, about two Geordie labourers who attempt to go into business together renovating an old London house owned by a pair of Yuppies. Tompkinson's performance was praised by James Rampton of The Independent:

It is Tompkinson who – despite having the less showy part – really catches the eye. In the shadow of a more successful brother and a domineering wife, he precisely captures an air of despondent, hen-pecked resignation. Like Eeyore, he seems to be pursued by his own personal raincloud. Nobody does defeated better. Tompkinson is an actor who's become a winner by playing the loser....Trevor can be added to the actor's growing gallery of characters whom viewers watch and think, 'I know that bloke.'

Tompkinson and Ballykissangel's Dervla Kirwan worked together again in 1999 on the TV version of Tim Firth's The Flint Street Nativity. They also co-starred in the 2001 mini-series Hereafter, which never aired in the UK but was released on DVD under the title Shades in the United States and Canada in 2012.

==== 2000s ====
In 2001, he co-starred with Heartbeat star Nick Berry in the mini-series In Deep, as part of BBC1's Crime Doubles season. The promotional material described his performance as "Tompkinson as you have never seen him before" and a career "gamble". He agreed with that assessment: "In Deep is a very gritty drama and not the kind of thing that I'm normally associated with".

Tompkinson and Claire Skinner appeared as a couple in Series 1 of the comedy Bedtime, which aired August and September 2001. In 2002, he appeared as the character 'Ted' with co-star Dawn French in the comedy drama mini-series Ted and Alice. The sitcom Mr. Charity (2001), which aired on BBC2, was panned by the critics, drew poor viewer ratings, and was axed after six episodes.

In 2003, after a long delay, ITV aired the mini-series Lucky Jim. Tompkinson had bought the rights to the Kingsley Amis novel, which had not been adapted for some time, with the intention of playing the central character. Jack Rosenthal did the screenplay. The cast included Keeley Hawes as his co-star and love interest Christine, Robert Hardy, Helen McCrory, Denis Lawson, Hermione Norris and Penelope Wilton. The Guardian praised it as "deftly adapted by Jack Rosenthal ... immaculately done, not least because of Stephen Tompkinson's performance as Jim, with stellar support from [the rest of the cast, especially] Helen McCrory." In December 2004, he appeared as Detective Inspector Slack in a new adaptation of Agatha Christie's The Murder at the Vicarage.

In 2004, Tompkinson played his first fact-based role in BBC1's two-part drama In Denial of Murder, playing the character of the journalist Don Hale. The drama was based on Hale's 2002 book Town Without Pity. There was controversy surrounding how the case was depicted, and in preparing to portray Don Hale he struggled to make sense of it. When asked his opinion, he explained that although he had done research to prepare for the role, he was merely an actor working from a script in which he had total faith and that he believed to be fair.

In 2005, Marian, Again was a psychological drama about the horrors that could lie within any community and just beyond anyone's front door. Owen Teale co-starred, along with Kelly Harrison in the title role and Samantha Beckinsale.

Of his role in Prime Suspect, Tompkinson says "I had a call from my agent who told me they were to film the last-ever Prime Suspect with Helen Mirren. And I said, 'Yes!' before she could finish. She said, 'There is a part you might be interested in...' and I said, 'I meant Yes, I'll do it, not Yes, please continue! I mean, here is a chance to work with one of the greatest actresses there is. Taking a part in the final Prime Suspect was the quickest decision I've ever made!"

ITV drama series Wild at Heart, created by Ashley Pharoah, began airing in the UK in January 2006 and ran for seven series. Tompkinson played Bristol veterinarian Danny Trevanion, who relocated with his family to South Africa where they attempted to build up a successful wildlife preserve and veterinary surgery. Tompkinson was also co-executive producer for 33 episodes and executive producer for one.

==== 2010s ====
In 2010 he was cast as Inspector Alan Banks in DCI Banks: Aftermath, a two-part television pilot adaptation of one of Peter Robinson's crime novels. DCI Banks: Aftermath drew seven million viewers, beating BBC1's Spooks in the ratings battle for the same timeslot. On 14 June 2013, ITV announced that DCI Banks has been commissioned for a third six-part series. He played a role in the BBC series Truckers during the same year.

=== Film ===
Barely out of drama school, he appeared in 1988 (as Stephen Duffell) with Ken Goodwin and Freddie Davies in Peter Chelsom's 11-minute short film titled Treacle. It was the tale of comedian Alfie Duffell's melodic legacy, set amid the Blackpool variety scene. The work received a 1988 BAFTA nomination in the category of Best Short Film.

In 1996 he starred in a British-made international feature film, Brassed Off, about a brass band in Grimley, a fictional Yorkshire colliery town where the mines are being shut down by the Tory government in the name of progress.

In 2000, he played the role of Dezmond Blanche in the bleakly satirical film Hotel Splendide.

In February 2012, he filmed his first lead role in a feature film titled Harrigan, described on its 2013 release in Britain as having "a thin budget and cartoonish script".

=== Stage ===
Tompkinson has said repeatedly that he enjoys the challenge of mixing television and film roles with live stage productions. He has appeared on stage in London's West End and in theatres across the UK. Of the 1992 production of Michael Wall's Women Laughing at the Royal Exchange Theatre, Alan Hulme of the Manchester Evening News described the cast as "superb....and the acting has the shocking eloquence of picture postcards in acid." And The Independent described The End of the Food Chain (1994) at the Stephen Joseph Theatre in Scarborough as "excellent" and "vividly acted."

In 2000 he appeared in David Pugh and Sean Connery's production of the French play 'Art' by Yasmina Reza at the Wyndham's Theatre in London. He played Yvan alongside James Fleet as Serge and Michael French as Marc.

2003 saw him starring as Mortimer Brewster, along with Michael Richards of Seinfeld fame, in Arsenic and Old Lace at The Strand Theatre in London. The part required him to deliver his lines in a New York accent. One reviewer commented, "The fact that many American audience members...assumed that Stephen was a bone fide American confirms the authenticity of his twang."

In 2007, he toured in Charley's Aunt, playing the role of Donna Lucia D'Alvadorez. In a review in the British Theatre Guide Sheila Connor said:

This is Stephen Tompkinson as you have never seen him before – hilarious even before he dons the frock. His manner, voice, expression and actions are spot-on....totally uproariously funny....It is at Babb's entrance that the play really takes off, Tompkinson revealing himself to be an inspired comic genius to add to his multitude of diverse credits....A truly entertainingly hilarious performance, and it is to be hoped that Tompkinson will treat us to more of the same.

In 2008, he played the deeply sinister and complex lead character of Vindice in the Jacobean bloodbath The Revenger's Tragedy at the Royal Exchange Theatre in Manchester. He felt sympathy for the character and explained why the play appealed to him:

He's not a villain, he's an anti-hero, really. You can see he has been wronged. The audience get to be voyeurs and enjoy watching him get his retribution. It's the black-and-white morality of the play, its bloodthirsty nature, that appealed to me. The way that things are dealt with, there was no red tape: it was out with the poison or the sword if you were wronged.

In 2009, he toured in Sign of the Times, playing the character of Frank Tollit, who has spent the past 25 years putting up letters on buildings but dreams of becoming a novelist. His colleague Alan (Tom Shaw), 30 years his junior, wants to be a rock star. Tompkinson said, "The play is a comedy but much more. It is about having dreams and ambition; it's about happiness and failure. Frank's good at his job; he does enjoy it, but he has bigger dreams. I think everyone will be able to relate to it."

When Shaun Prendergast, who is a friend, wrote Faith and Cold Reading he created the part of a villain called Freddie the Suit for Tompkinson. The staging of that play at the Live Theatre in Newcastle in February–March 2011 is his most recent stage run.

Tompkinson made his musical theatre debut in London's West End in the lead role of King Arthur in Monty Python's Spamalot at the Playhouse Theatre 20 November 2012.

In 2018, he played Yvan in the UK tour of 'Art', having previously played the role at the Wyndham's Theatre in London's West End in 2000.

During the Christmas 2018 season he played Ebenezer Scrooge in Jack Thorne's new adaptation of A Christmas Carol at The Old Vic, London.

In 2019 he is touring a production of Willy Russell's Educating Rita, co-starring with Jessica Johnson. This has been very well received by both critics and audiences.

=== Presenter ===
Tompkinson has hosted or narrated a number of other UK television programs, including a FIFA 100 Years of Football documentary. In 1999, he presented the BBC2 documentary Great Railway Journeys: Singapore to Bangkok, part of Series 4 of the popular Great Railway Journeys travel documentaries that aired over many years in the UK and on PBS in the U.S.

In 2009, he took part in the documentary, Stephen Tompkinson's Great African Balloon Adventure, a three-part series inspired by Jules Verne's first novel Five Weeks in a Balloon. It followed Tompkinson and his guide, hot air ballooning expert Robin Batchelor, as they travelled 6,108 miles in six weeks from coast to coast, above and on the ground in Tanzania, Rwanda, Zambia, Botswana and Namibia. The series aired on ITV in the UK in June 2009 and was later distributed by American Public Television in the U.S. The African balloon series was well received, and ITV commissioned a three-part follow-up series that aired on ITV1 in 2010, titled Stephen Tompkinson's Australian Balloon Adventure.

=== Narrator/voice-over ===
He has done a variety of voice-over work, including adverts, audio books, and narration. His many adverts include BT Childline, British Midland, Motorola, Alton Towers, Comet, Eurostar, Laphroaig Whisky, Mercury & Kwiksave, Bulmers Cider, Tetley Tea and the People's Dispensary for Sick Animals.

His narrated TV programmes and shows include Little Red Tractor, Trail of Guilt: Harold Shipman: Addicted to Murder (2000), When Snooker Ruled the World (2002), A Band for Britain (2010) and Choccywoccydoodah (2014). In addition, he has narrated numerous audiobooks.

=== Director ===
In 2006, Tompkinson made his directing debut in the Midlands, at the helm of the BBC1 afternoon drama The Lightning Kid. He was shadowed by a film crew making the documentary Director's Debut: Stephen Tompkinson's Story that aired immediately prior to the drama, with the intent of revealing the challenges faced by a new director.

== Other involvements ==
Tompkinson has supported various causes by providing promotional videos or voiceovers. These include a fundraising effort toward research to find a cure for Duchenne Muscular Dystrophy (DMD) and a financial appeal by Chester Zoo He has also supported causes such as the Westminster Carers Time Bank and, in 2008, he became an Ambassador for Project African Wilderness (PAW), a not-for-profit organisation that seeks to protect and restore the Mwabvi Wildlife Reserve in Malawi.

In February 2012, Tompkinson supported the launch of a foundation established by Robbie Elliot, the former Newcastle United footballer who had helped Tompkinson improve his fitness for filming Harrigan. Elliott was proposing to complete a charity bicycle ride to raise funds for the Sir Bobby Robson Foundation and Breakthrough Breast Cancer. Stories captured along the ride – from Lisbon to Newcastle – will be made into a documentary narrated by Tompkinson and premiered in London in late 2012.

In late 2011, he recorded an advert for Text Santa, a charity initiative set up by ITV to support nine UK charities at Christmas. Stars of other ITV shows made similar adverts. In January 2012, it was announced that £4,120,000 was raised for the various charities.

Over the years he has participated in Comic Relief's Red Nose Day. In 2001, he was one of the team describing the work the charity does in Britain, helping victims of early Alzheimer's or teenagers who are HIV positive. In 1997, Tompkinson and Kirwan did a Comic Relief sketch titled Ballykissdibley – with Dawn French and the cast of The Vicar of Dibley – in which they played their Ballykissangel characters, Fr. Peter Clifford and Assumpta Fitzgerald.

== Personal life ==
He was married to Celia Anastasia and subsequent to the couple's divorce he became engaged to Ballykissangel co-star Dervla Kirwan. He then married Nicci Taylor, with whom he has a daughter, Daisy Ellen. It was announced in December 2006 that they had separated and would divorce.

He is an avid cricket fan. He once said that if he wasn't an actor he "wouldn't mind travelling the world as a cricket commentator, enjoying endless summers." In 2008 he wrote an article for The Wisden Cricketer about Darren Gough.

== Filmography ==
=== Television ===
Year	Title	Role	Other notes
1987	All at No 20	Police Constable	Episode: "The Prowler"
1988	Never the Twain	Darran	Episode: "Fasten Your Seat Belts"
1988	The Return of Shelley	PC Knight	Episode: "Why Me?"
1989	After Henry	Julian	Episode: "Intellectual Aspirations"
1989	And a Nightingale Sang	Eric	TV movie
1989	The Manageress	Jim Wilson	3 episodes
1989	Tales of Sherwood Forest	Kevin	3 episodes
1989	Casualty	Tony Mitton	Episode: "Chain Reaction"
1989	Hit the Pitch	Andy	TV movie
1990	Chancer	Markus Warton	12 episodes
1990	Made in Heaven	Woody	Episode: "A Fair Mix Up"
1990–1998	Drop the Dead Donkey	Damien Day	66 episodes
1991	Minder	DC Johnny Park	9 episodes
1992	Boon	Stephen Alwyn	Episode: "A Shot in the Dark"
1992–1994	Shakespeare: The Animated Tales	Sir Andrew / Autolycus	Episodes: "The Winter's Tale" & "Twelfth Night"
1994	Performance	Philip Welch	Episode: "The Deep Blue Sea"
1994	All Quiet on the Preston Front	Private Simon 'Spock' Matlock	6 episodes
1994	Downwardly Mobile	Mark	7 episodes
1995	Screen Two	Jeremy Craig	Episode: "A Very Open Prison"
1996	Square One		ABC Pilot
1996	Father Ted	Father Peter Clifford	Episode: "A Christmassy Ted"
1996–1998	Ballykissangel	Father Peter Clifford	Series 1–3; 22 episodes
1997	Ballykissdibley	Father Peter Clifford	Special
1998	Oktober	Jim Harper	3 episodes
1998–1999	Grafters	Trevor Purvis	Series 1–2; 13 episodes
1999	The Flint Street Nativity	Narrator / Tim Moyle	TV movie
1999	Dad	Barry Martin	Episode: "Nemesis"
2000	Black Cab	Christopher	Episode: "Busy Body"
2001	Bedtime	Paul Newcombe	6 episodes
2001	Shades	Mark Roberts	6 episodes
2001	Mr. Charity	Graham Templeton	6 episodes
2001	Bob the Builder	Tom	Episode: "A Christmas to Remember"
2001–2003	In Deep	DC Garth O'Hanlon	Series 1–3; 22 episodes
2002	Ted and Alice	Ted	3 episodes
2002	Waiting for the Whistle	Billy Gowland	Episode: "Staying Up"
2003	Lucky Jim	Jim Dixon	TV movie
2004	In Denial of Murder	Don Hale	2 episodes
2004	My Dad's the Prime Minister	Venning	Episode: "Desert Island"
2004	Agatha Christie's Marple	DI Slack	Episode: "The Murder at the Vicarage"
2004–2007	Little Red Tractor	Stan	38 episodes
2005	The Last Detective	Simon Dabney	Episode: "Friends Reunited"
2005	New Tricks	Chris McConnel	Episode: "Old and Cold"
2005	Marian, Again	Chris Bevan	2 episodes
2005	ShakespeaRe-told	Harry Kavanagh	Episode: "The Taming of the Shrew"
2006	Dalziel and Pascoe	Brian Fairmile	Episode: "Guardian Angel"
2006	Prime Suspect	Sean Phillips	Episode: "The Final Act"
2006–2012	Wild at Heart	Danny Trevanion	Series 1–7; 66 episodes
2010–2016	DCI Banks	DCI Alan Banks	Series 1–5; 32 episodes
2013	Harrigan	DS Barry Harrigan	Pilot
2013	Truckers	Malachi Davies	5 episodes
2014–2018	Trollied	Brian	Series 4–7; 27 episodes
2017	The Keith and Paddy Picture Show	Quint	Episode: "Jaws"
2017	Eric, Ernie and Me	Eddie Braben	TV movie
2017–2020	The Other One	Mr. Shippen	3 episodes
2018	The Split	Davey McKenzie	6 episodes
2018	Torvill & Dean	George Torvill	TV movie
2021	The Bay	Stephen Marshbrook	1 episode
2022	Sherwood	Warnock	1 episode
2023	The Long Shadow	David Gee	TV mini-series
2026	Ellis	DCI Chalmers	Season 2, episodes 3 and 4
2025	This Is Not a Murder Mystery	DCI Thistletwaite	6 episodes

| 2026 | The Fortune The Fortune (TV series)

=== Film ===
(chronologically descending)

Title	Character	Type	Date
Hotel Splendide	Dezmond Blanche	Feature Film	2000
Brassed Off	Phil	Feature Film	1996
Treacle	Stephen Duffell	Short Film	1988

== Stage ==
(chronologically descending)
(see above for additional detail)

Title	Role	Author	Theatre	Date
Art	Yvan	Yasmina Reza	On Tour	2019
A Christmas Carol	Ebenezer Scrooge	Jack Thorne	The Old Vic, London	2018–2019
White Rabbit, Red Rabbit		Nassim Soleimanpour	Live Theatre, Newcastle	2013
Spamalot	King Arthur	Eric Idle (Book & Lyrics)	Playhouse Theatre, London	2012–2013
Faith and Cold Reading	Freddie the Suit	Shaun Prendergast	Live Theatre, Newcastle	2011
Sign of the Times	Frank Tollit	Tim Firth	On Tour	2009
The Revenger's Tragedy	Vindice	Cyril Tourneur (Attributed)	Royal Exchange, Manchester	2008
Charley's Aunt	Donna Lucia D’Alvadorez	Brandon Thomas	On Tour	2007
Rattle of a Simple Man	Percy	Charles Dyer	Malvern/Comedy Theatre, London	2004
Cloaca	Pieter	Maria Goos	Old Vic, London	2004
Arsenic and Old Lace	Mortimer Brewster	Joseph Kesselring	Strand Theatre, London	2003
Art	Yvan	Yasmina Reza	Wyndham's Theatre, Scarborough	2000
Tartuffe	Tartuffe	Molière	On Tour	1998
The End of the Food Chain	Bruce	Tim Firth	Stephen Joseph Theatre, Scarborough	1993
Women Laughing	Tony	Michael Wall	Royal Exchange, Manchester	1992
Love's Labour's Lost	Navarre	Shakespeare	Royal Exchange, Manchester	1992
Across the Ferry	Alec	Ted Moore	Bush Theatre, London	1991
Absent Friends	Colin	Alan Ayckbourn		
No One Sees the Video	Paul	Martin Crimp	Royal Court Theatre, London	1990
The Boys from Syracuse		Richard Rodgers (Music) and Lorenz Hart (Lyrics)	London School of Speech and Drama	1987

== Radio ==
(chronologically descending)

Broadcast Date	Title	Author	Station
13 April 2013	Great Escape – The Justice	Robin Brooks; Robert Radcliffe	BBC Radio 4
17 July 2012	The Gift	Jane Thornton	BBC Radio 4
26 April 2010	Lifecoach	Nick Walker	BBC Radio 4
30 March 2010	The Porter and the Three Ladies	Rachel Joyce	BBC Radio 4
9 February 2010; 9 March 2010	Say What You Want to Hear	Tim Wright	BBC Radio 4
19 May 2008	Brass Britain	Rosemary Foxcroft; Ashley Byrne; Phil Collinge	BBC Radio 2
26 March 2008	Pier Shorts: Four Battenburgs	Michael Odell	BBC Radio 4
16–18 April 2007	Stormbreaker	Anthony Horowitz	BBC Radio 4
4 February 2007	Two Men from Delft	Stephen Wakelam	BBC Radio 3
2 October 2006	Small Island	Andrea Levy	BBC Radio 7
30 June – 4 August 2006	This Sporting Life	David Storey	BBC Radio 2
14–18 November 2005	Confessions of a Bad Mother	Stephanie Calman	BBC Radio 4
5 September 2004	The Diary of a Nobody	George Grossmith; Weedon Grossmith	BBC Radio 4
30 August – 27 September 2004	One, Two, Buckle My Shoe	Agatha Christie	BBC Radio 4
19 March 2004	Billy Liar	Keith Waterhouse	BBC Radio 4
3 October 2003	Kes	Barry Hines	BBC Radio 7
22 February 2003	The Long Weekend	Jeremy Front	BBC Radio 4
13 September 2000	Breakfast in Brighton	Nigel Richardson	BBC Radio 4
11 July 2000	Shaggy Dog Stories: A Partner for Life	Kate Atkinson	BBC Radio 4
31 March 2000	Latin Shorts: Taxi Driver Minus Robert De Niro	Fernando Ampuero	BBC Radio 4
19 March 1998	The Big Town All Stars: If You Scratch My Back	Bill Dare	BBC Radio 4
19 July 1997	The Ingenious Mind of Rigby Lacksome	Ernest Bramah	BBC Radio 4
5 March 1995	Life of Galileo	Berthold Brecht	BBC Radio 4
2 August 1994	Virtual Radio	Andrew Dallmeyer	BBC Radio 4
22 May 1994	Shelley (Radio adaptation of TV sitcom)	Peter Tilbury	BBC Radio 2
14 November 1991	The Cabaret of Dr Caligari: Comedian's Moon	Alan Gilbey	BBC Radio 4
3 July 1991	Hat Trick: The Ashes	Sue Townsend	BBC Radio 3
23 June 1991	A Midsummer Night's Dream	William Shakespeare	BBC Radio 3
28 September 1990	Pravda	David Hare; Howard Brenton	BBC Radio 3
15 September 1990	The Murder on the Links *	Agatha Christie (adapted by Michael Bakewell)	BBC Radio 4
9 July 1990	Cloud Cuckoo Land	Catherine Czerkawska	BBC Radio 4
31 March 1990	Pocketful of Dreams	Stuart Kerr	BBC Radio 4
16 January 1990	The Adventures of Sherlock Holmes with Clive Merrison: The Engineer's Thumb	Victor Hatherley	BBC Radio 4
22 March 1989	Haunted by More Cake	Steve Walker	BBC Radio 4
1 March 1988	Tickertape and V-Signs	Peter Cox	BBC Radio 3
9 February 1988	Madame Aubray's Principles	Alexandre Dumas, fils	BBC Radio 3
7 September 1987	The Man That Got Away	Philip Norman	BBC Radio 4

*90-minute radio play presented on the centenary of Agatha Christie's birth

== Awards ==
Year	Result	Award	Category	For
2013	Won	Royal Television Society (RTS) Yorkshire, UK	Best Drama	DCI Banks
2012	Nominated	The Specsavers Crime Thriller Awards 2012, UK	Detective Duo of the Year	DCI Banks
2012	Nominated	National Television Awards, UK	Drama Performance: Male	Wild at Heart and DCI Banks
2011	Nominated	National Television Awards, UK	Best Drama Performance	Wild at Heart
2011	Nominated	TV Times Awards 2011, UK	Favourite Actor	Wild at Heart and DCI Banks
2010	Won	TV Times Awards 2010, UK	Favourite Drama	Wild at Heart
2010	Nominated	Monte-Carlo TV Festival Golden Nymph Awards	Outstanding Actor – Drama Series	Wild at Heart
2008	Nominated	TV Quick Awards, UK	Best Actor	Wild at Heart
2006	Nominated	Monte-Carlo TV Festival Golden Nymph Awards	Outstanding Actor – Drama Series	Wild at Heart
1998	Nominated	National Television Awards, UK	Most Popular Actor	Ballykissangel
1996	Nominated	National Television Awards, UK	Most Popular Actor	Ballykissangel
1994	Won	British Comedy Awards, UK	Best TV Comedy Actor	Drop the Dead Donkey
1987	Won	BBC Carleton Hobbs Award	Bursary Award	Student Competition

(Source: Internet Movie Database (IMDB), unless otherwise cited)
