= Gyula Pados =

Hungarian cinematographer and director (born 1969)

- Born: 2 April 1969 (age 57); Budapest, Hungary
- Years active: 1991–present

Gyula Pados (Hungarian: [ˈɟulɒ ˈpɒdoʃ]; born 2 April 1969) is a Hungarian cinematographer, best known for his collaboration with director Wes Ball.

== Life and career ==
Pados was born in Budapest, Hungary. In 1990, he attended the Academy of Drama and Film in Budapest as a cinematographer. He worked as a camera assistant to Academy Award-winner Vilmos Zsigmond. As a university student, he and his friends founded a company, which is still the third largest Hungarian commercial film studio. His diploma work was cinematographing and directing Hajnal, for which he was awarded several prizes. Then he cinematographed The dance. Later, he made Angyal utca with a completely Hungarian team. In England, he shot the short movie Meter Running, written by Charles Martin and directed by David Moore. After getting his degree in 1996, he returned to England and shot The Star and The Sin Eater.

In 2000, he was the cinematographer of Hotel Splendide, which was also awarded. His last movie in England was The Heart of Me. He came back to Hungary in 2003, filming Kontroll, which made him famous also in Hungary. After this movie, he was the cinematographer of the movie Fateless in 2005.

His first major Hollywood film was Predators (2010), and he has also shot the blockbuster films Maze Runner: The Scorch Trials (2015), Jumanji: Welcome to the Jungle (2017) and its 2019 sequel, and Shazam! Fury of the Gods (2023).

== Filmography ==
=== Feature film ===
Year	Title	Director	Notes
2000	Hotel Splendide	Terence Gross	
2002	The Heart of Me	Thaddeus O'Sullivan	
2003	Kontroll	Nimród Antal	
2004	Állítsátok meg Terézanyut!	Péter Bergendy	
2005	Fateless	Lajos Koltai	
2006	Basic Instinct 2	Michael Caton-Jones	
2007	Evening	Lajos Koltai	
2008	Kalandorok	Béla Paczolay	
2008	The Duchess	Saul Dibb	
2010	Predators	Nimród Antal	
2013	Metallica: Through the Never	Nimród Antal	
2014	Million Dollar Arm	Craig Gillespie	
2015	Maze Runner: The Scorch Trials	Wes Ball	
2017	Jumanji: Welcome to the Jungle	Jake Kasdan	
2018	Maze Runner: The Death Cure	Wes Ball	
2019	Jumanji: The Next Level	Jake Kasdan	
2023	Shazam! Fury of the Gods	David F. Sandberg	
2024	Kingdom of the Planet of the Apes	Wes Ball	
2027	The Legend of Zelda †	Wes Ball	Post-production

=== Television ===
Year	Title	Director	Notes
2013	Trooper	Craig Gillespie	Unaired pilot
2014	Scorpion	Justin Lin	Episode "Pilot"

== Awards and nominations ==
In 1991 he got the first success with the movie Hajnal ('Dawn'): he won the Grand Prix of the Oberhausen Film Festival, the Wim Wenders Prize at the Munich Film Festival, the Grand Prix of the Potsdam Film Festival and the Main Prize of the Hungarian Film Festival.

In 1995 he was awarded for Angyal utca ('Angel Street') at the Munich Film Festival.

In 1998 he was awarded Kodak Prize for The Sin Eater at the Locarno International Film Festival.

Year	Award	Category	Title	Result
2000	Sitges Film Festival	Best Cinematography	Hotel Splendide	Won
2003	Copenhagen International Film Festival	Best Cinematographer	Kontroll	Won
2005	Copenhagen International Film Festival	Best Cinematographer	Fateless	Won
2005	European Film Awards	Best Cinematographer	Fateless	Nominated
2005	Camerimage	Golden Frog	Fateless	Won
2008	Camerimage	Golden Frog	The Duchess	Nominated
2008	Satellite Awards	Best Cinematography	The Duchess	Nominated
