= Operation Elvis =

- Written by: CP Taylor
- Characters: Malcolm; Alex / Mr Green / Jackie; Mam / Sister / Lynn; Michael
- Original language: English
- Genre: Drama, Children’s theatre
- Setting: Northgate Hospital, Morpeth

Premiere
- Date premiered: 1978
- Place premiered: Newcastle upon Tyne, England

Operation Elvis by C.P. Taylor is a play for children, first produced by the Live Theatre Company in Newcastle upon Tyne in 1978. Taylor worked as a drama teacher at Morpeth's Northgate Hospital, and used it as the main setting for the play. Critics have noted that, in keeping with his other works for children, Operation Elvis is notable for its engagement with complex social issues such as disability, being “written from the unsentimental standpoint that children's relationships are as complicated as those of adults.”

The original cast included Tim Healy, Max Roberts, Denise Bryson and Brian Hogg, and the production was directed by Teddy Kiendl. The play has become a classic of Theatre for Young Audiences, revived by TAG Theatre Company, the Royal Shakespeare Company at the Almeida Theatre, M6 Theatre, Bruvvers, the Tricycle Theatre with Kevin Whately as Malcolm, and the Byre Theatre as part of the 1992 Edinburgh International Festival. It was filmed with the original cast by BBC North East in 1980, recorded for radio by BBC Scotland in 1982, and has been slated for film adaptation.

Tim Healy described Malcolm as his favourite stage role: “We did 90 performances in eight weeks. We’d go to a school, unload the van, put the set up, do the play, knock it down and onto the next school... and they were the happiest days of my life.”

== Plot overview ==
Ten-year-old schoolboy Malcolm is convinced that he is the reincarnation of Elvis Presley and loves to sing his greatest hits and dress like the King. His mother, her boyfriend, and his teacher Mr Green are becoming increasingly exasperated with his odd behaviour, and only Jackie, a local pigeon-fancier, seems to understand him. Malcolm decides to run away from home, hoping to find his way to Elvis’ home in Memphis, Tennessee. He ends up 15 miles away in Morpeth in Northumberland, where he meets Michael, a boy with severe brain damage who cannot speak, and his carer, Lynn. Despite their differences, Malcolm and Michael strike up a friendship. Malcolm realises that Michael wants to go sailing on a local lake, but they cannot work out how to get his wheelchair into a boat, and the Sister at Michael's hospital refuses to allow it. Secretly, Jackie and Lynn help the boys build a special harness to lift Michael from the dock into a boat. Malcolm realises that he no longer needs to pretend to be Elvis and they set off across the water.
