= Good (play) =

Play by Cecil Philip Taylor

- Original playbill for the 1982 Broadway production
- Original language: English
- Written by: Cecil Philip Taylor
- Subject: The path of Professor John Halder to the embrace of Nazi antisemitism
- Genre: Drama, Tragedy
- Setting: Frankfurt, 1932–41

Premiere
- Date: 9 September 1981
- Place: Donmar Warehouse London, England

Good is a play in two acts, written by Scottish playwright Cecil Philip Taylor. First published for Methuen Drama in 1982, it was originally commissioned by the Royal Shakespeare Company in 1981 and was subsequently seen all over the world. Good has been described as the definitive piece written about the Holocaust in the English-speaking theatre. Set in pre-war Germany, it shows how John Halder, a liberal-minded professor whose best friend, Maurice, is Jewish, could not only be seduced into joining the Nazis, but step-by-rationalised-step end up embracing the Final Solution, justifying to his conscience the terrible actions involved.

== Plot overview ==
John Halder is a Frankfurt literary professor and an example of the good man: he is apparently devoted to his wife and children and he does his best to look after his aged mother. He even tells his best friend, a Jewish psychiatrist, that the anti-Semitism of the National Socialists is "just a balloon they throw up in the air to distract the masses." But this is Germany in 1933, and men can change. Cecil P. Taylor, in tracing his hero's progress over eight years towards the upper echelons of the SS, plausibly explains the private flaws that lead to endorsement of public monstrosity. Beneath Halder's surface 'goodness' lies a chilling moral detachment: he can abandon his distracted wife for a devoted student, he has written a pro-euthanasia novel and shortly afterwards gives ideas on euthanatizing people without the consent of anyone involved (the people aren’t supposed to know they’re dying and their families are never even told about it), he hears in his head a continuous musical score that helps blot out daily reality. Taylor's point is that Nazism preyed on individual character flaws and on a missing moral dimension in otherwise educated and intelligent people. At first Halder believes he can help 'push the Nazis towards humanity'. Slowly he succumbs to vanity, careerism and the desire for an easy life. Above all, he remains curiously detached from reality. At the end Halder not only becomes a member of the Nazi party but also plays a direct role in SS book burnings, in euthanasia experiments, in the night of the Broken Glass, and, finally, in Adolf Eichmann's genocide at Auschwitz, where Maurice, the sole source of a Jewish perspective in the play and original force of "good" in Halder, ends up being deported.

== Themes ==
Good is a play about the causes rather than the consequences of Nazism, about morality and seduction. It explores how a "good" man gets caught up in the intricate web of personal and social reasons why the average person might be seduced in to what we see as abhorrent. The author thus rejects the view that the Nazi atrocities are explained as a result of the simple conspiracy of criminals and psychopaths. Furthermore, the lessons of Nazism and the play are not just about the revulsion resulting from six million dead but are also a warning about popular movements that lead to holocausts. Not judgmental of its protagonist, Good invites us to question just what a "good" man is and does and where the bounds of responsibility lie.

Historical moments referred to in the play are included:

- January 1933 – Hitler took office
- May 1933 – Book burning at the University of Berlin (Note: The play is set in Frankfurt, where there was also a book burning. A memorial to this event can be found in the city centre at the Römerberg.)
- July 1934 – Murder of SA Leader Ernst Röhm (in the Night of the Long Knives)
- November 1938 – Shooting of Ernst vom Rath
- November 1938 – The night of the Broken Glass (the Anti-Jewish Pogroms)
- June 1941 – Nazi War against the Soviet Union
- June 1941 – Rudolf Höss ordered to establish extermination facilities at Auschwitz.

== Productions ==
Good was originally commissioned by the Royal Shakespeare Company and premiered on 9 September 1981 at the Donmar Warehouse in Covent Garden, London. The play was directed by Howard Davies with Alan Howard in the role of Halder and Joe Melia as Maurice. Good opened on Broadway on 13 October 1982, with Gary Waldhorn taking over the role of Maurice. It was subsequently seen all over the world. It was produced by the Brunton Theatre Company in Musselburgh, under the direction of Charles Nowosielski, in 1989.

In 1998, it secured joint 85th place in the Royal National Theatre's Survey of the "Most Significant Plays of the 20th Century". A year later, Michael Grandage directed in its original theatre a successful new production, with Charles Dance playing John Halder, Ian Gelder as Maurice, and Faith Brook as Halder's mother. The London Evening Standard described the event "one of the most powerful, politically pointed nights at the theatre."

The play has been performed by many regional theatre companies, including the Havant Arts Centre in 1986, the North Wall Arts Centre in 2008, the Hilberry Theater in 2010, the Royal Exchange Theatre, Everyman Theatre, Cardiff in 2011, and the Burning Coal Theatre Company in 2013.

A 12-week production, starring David Tennant, began at the Harold Pinter Theatre in London's West End in October 2022. The play was originally scheduled to play for 10 weeks at the Playhouse Theatre with previews beginning 6 October 2020. However, the production was rescheduled twice due to the COVID-19 pandemic. The play was filmed and broadcast in movie theaters beginning in April 2023.

== Reception ==
Reviewing the Broadway production, Frank Rich of The New York Times wrote that "Good is an undeniably provocative work, and Mr. Taylor, who died last year at the age of 53, has written it with an intelligent, light touch in a most imaginative form. But for all the author's efforts to break through our received ideas about the origins of Nazism and to avoid black and white moral imperatives, his play doesn't add anything to the generalities of the past. ... The high point of Mr. Davies's staging, as well as of the script and of Mr. Howard's performance, comes in the final moments, when Halder finally arrives in Auschwitz and confronts a band that, for once, he cannot tune out. It's the play's only truly devastating passage because, at last, we and Halder are face-to-face with the horror of the Holocaust. But, even then, we're still left feeling impotent before history, for we're still wondering just how Halder ended up there. Like too many Nazi criminals before him, the protagonist of Good has eluded his erstwhile prosecutors and stolen into the night, the dark secrets of his soul intact."

Writing for The Boston Phoenix, Sylviane Gold said that "The trouble with the surprises in Taylor's play is that they never add up. First we are asked to believe that an otherwise healthy individual hears things. That gave me problems right off the bat — where I grew up, we were taught that if you heard things or saw things that weren't there, you were yourself not all there. ... I've ranked [Howard] with the two or three best actors I've seen. So this performance is doubly baffling, doubly disappointing to me. Howard is so busy giving Halder everything he’s got that the character never becomes human; he’s just a collection of mannerisms. ... If Good can be said to have any redeeming virtues, they must lie in the clever way Taylor has the Nazis use his hero. Instead of forcing the humanistic academic to become part of the Nazi killing machine, the high command merely requires him to justify it. He turns out dissertations rather than corpses — a subtlety that seems to be lost on many theatergoers."

== Film adaptation ==
A film adaptation of the play, featuring Viggo Mortensen as John Halder and directed by Vicente Amorim, was released in December 2008.
