= Hotel Splendide (2000 film) =

- Hotel Splendide promotional poster
- Directed by: Terence Gross
- Written by: Terence Gross
- Produced by: Robert Buckler; Ildiko Kemeny
- Starring: Toni Collette; Daniel Craig; Katrin Cartlidge; Stephen Tompkinson; Hugh O'Conor; Helen McCrory; Peter Vaughan
- Cinematography: Gyula Pados
- Edited by: Michael Ellis
- Music by: Mark Tschanz
- Distributed by: FilmFour Distributors
- Release date: 22 September 2000
- Running time: 98 minutes
- Country: United Kingdom
- Language: English

Hotel Splendide is a 2000 British independent dark comedy film, written and directed by Terence Gross and starring Toni Collette and Daniel Craig. The film appeared in a number of British and European film festivals but was not released in the US, although it did appear on cable networks on channels catering to independent film. It was shown on Film4 in June 2026 in the UK, and is available in the US via video on demand.

The film tells the story of the Blanche family who run a dark and dismal health resort on a remote island which is only accessible by ferry. The spa program consists of feeding the guests seaweed and eel-based meals, then administering liberal colonic irrigation. The spa is run by the family matriarch, Dame Blanche, until her death.

Things continue with her children running the resort until Kath, the resort's former sous chef and the love interest of one of the sons, comes back to the island unannounced. Stranded between monthly ferries, she is a catalyst for a series of events that turns life as it is known at Hotel Splendide on its ear.

== Cast ==
- Toni Collette as Kath
- Daniel Craig as Ronald Blanche
- Katrin Cartlidge as Cora Blanche
- Stephen Tompkinson as Dezmond Blanche
- Hugh O'Conor as Stanley Smith
- Helen McCrory as Lorna Bull
- Peter Vaughan as Morton Blanche
- Joerg Stadler as Sergei Gorgonov
- Clare Cathcart as Lorraine Bull
- John Boswall as Bellboy
- Nadine Leonard as Chambermaid
- Toby Jones as Kitchen Boy
- Dan Hildebrand as Waiter
- Imogen Claire as Edna Blanche

== Production ==
The film was shot partially on location at the Slieve Donard hotel in Newcastle, Northern Ireland.
