= Good (film) =

- Theatrical film poster
- Directed by: Vicente Amorim
- Screenplay by: John Wrathall
- Based on: Good by Cecil Philip Taylor
- Produced by: Miriam Segal
- Starring: Viggo Mortensen; Jason Isaacs; Jodie Whittaker
- Cinematography: Andrew Dunn
- Edited by: John Wilson
- Music by: Simon Lacey
- Production company: BBC Films
- Distributed by: Lionsgate (United Kingdom); THINKFilm (United States)
- Release dates: 8 September 2008 (TIFF); 11 December 2008 (Hungary); 17 April 2009 (United Kingdom)
- Running time: 96 minutes
- Countries: United Kingdom; Germany; Hungary
- Language: English
- Budget: $16 million
- Box office: $1.5 million

Good is a 2008 drama film based on the stage play of the same name by Cecil Philip Taylor. It stars Viggo Mortensen, Jason Isaacs, and Jodie Whittaker, and was directed by Vicente Amorim. The film premiered at the Toronto International Film Festival on 8 September 2008.

== Plot ==
The story begins in 1930s Germany, against the backdrop of the Third Reich's ascendancy. John Halder is a German university professor who lives with his overly anxious wife, 2 children and a mother with senile dementia. He writes a paper called, "The Case for Mercy Death on the Grounds of Humanity", to explore his personal predicament and the justification of euthanasia. His paper catches the attention of the Nazi party, who send a high-ranking Nazi officer, Reichsleiter Philipp Bouhler, to help them push their agenda and offer him a job. After publishing the paper his career and social status advance, but he does not realise the consequences his work will have. Halder is set on a path that will lead to him divorcing his wife, marrying a young Nazi sympathiser, Anne, and gaining an honorary SS commission.

Halder's best friend, a Jewish psychologist called Maurice who fought alongside him in World War I, voices his concerns about Halder's choices. As it becomes more dangerous for Jews in Germany, Maurice approaches Halder to gain exit papers, but Halder is unwilling to risk his own standing and status to help save his best friend. By the time he is willing to do so, it is too late as Maurice has been turned into the SS by his wife.

Halder dons an SS uniform and visits a concentration camp where he is confronted by the reality that his choices and actions helped put into motion.

== Cast ==
- Viggo Mortensen as John Halder
- Jason Isaacs as Maurice Israel Glückstein
- Jodie Whittaker as Anne Hartman (later Halder)
- Steven Mackintosh as Freddie
- Mark Strong as Philipp Bouhler
- Gemma Jones as Halder's Mother
- Anastasia Hille as Helen Halder
- Ruth Gemmell as Elisabeth
- Ralph Riach as Brunau
- Steven Elder as Adolf Eichmann
- Kevin Doyle as Commandant
- David de Keyser as Mandelstam
- Guy Henry as Doctor
- Adrian Schiller as Goebbels
- Rick Warden as Brownshirt
- Charlie Condou as Bekemeier
- Kelly Wenham as Pretty Secretary
- Anna Marie Cseh as Beautiful Woman

== Production ==
Producer Miriam Segal had wanted to turn C. P. Taylor's play into a film ever since she saw it in 1981. Good premiered in London in September 1981, with Alan Howard as John Halder, and transferred to Broadway in 1982. "I was simply overwhelmed by the play, and knew immediately I would do whatever was necessary to produce the film adaptation", Segal has stated.

In 2003, 22 years after the play's premiere, Miriam finally secured the rights. Her former classmate, Jason Isaacs, signed on to be one of the film’s executive producers, and Viggo Mortensen, who had been very impressed by the play when visiting London as a young actor in 1981, agreed to play the lead. The film was shot entirely on location in Budapest in 2007.

== Critical reception ==
The film was poorly received by critics, and its release was limited. On Rotten Tomatoes it has a 33% rating based on 72 reviews. The site's consensus reads: "Though ambitious, Good stumbles in the transition from stage to screen, and Mortensen's performance isn't enough to cover its flaws". Metacritic, which uses a weighted average, assigned the film a score of 40 out of 100, based on 16 critics, indicating "mixed or average" reviews. Historian Frank McDonough praised the film, recommending it on the historical podcast 'We Have Ways of Making You Talk'.

== See also ==
- Martin Heidegger - a Professor of Philosophy in Freiburg promoted to Rector under the Nazis
- Hannah Arendt - a student and lover of Martin Heidegger
- Edith Stein - a victim of the Holocaust who was murdered at Auschwitz, fellow protégée with Heidegger of the phenomenologist Edmund Husserl
