= Anna Marie Cseh =

Hungarian actress and model

- Born: 17 September 1977 (age 49); Budapest, Hungary
- Occupations: Model; actress
- Years active: 1995–present
- Height: 1.78 m (5 ft 10 in)

Anna Marie Cseh (born 17 September 1977) is a Hungarian stage and film actress and former fashion model. She rose to international fame as the face of Thierry Mugler's cult perfume, Angel. She played her first lead role in Attila Mispál's Paths of Light (2005).

== Early life ==
Anna Marie Cseh was born in Budapest, Hungary. Her father is an engineer. At the age of 14 she enrolled in a modelling course, quickly gaining attention in the Budapest fashion scene. In 1995 she won the prominent international Ford Models Supermodel of the World modeling contest in Las Vegas. Subsequently, she started to work with Ford Modeling Agency in New York City, later transferring to Elite Model Management and Karin Models in Paris.

For most of her modeling career, Anna Marie divided her time between New York and Paris. She later studied International Relations at Corvinus University of Budapest and received a diploma of French literature at Cergy-Pontoise University in Paris.

In 2005, she married Woyzeck actor Lajos Kovács. She currently lives in Shoreditch, London with her husband Edson and their daughter Lara.

== Modeling career ==
Having modeled from the age of 17, Anna Marie Cseh appeared on the catwalks of Valentino, Yves Saint Laurent, Christian Lacroix, Fendi, Chanel, Gucci, Dolce & Gabbana, Giorgio Armani, Gianfranco Ferré, Christian Dior, Elie Saab, Pierre Balmain, Salvatore Ferragamo and Matthew Williamson.

Anna Marie was photographed for magazines like Elle, L'Officiel, Marie Claire, Vogue, and Cosmopolitan among others, often appearing on the cover. She was also photographed for a number of leading labels, such as La Perla, Garnier, Louis Vuitton, and Bvlgari. She was the muse and spokesperson of Thierry Mugler's highly popular perfume, Angel.

== Acting career ==
Hungarian director Attila Mispál approached Anna Marie Cseh during the Budapest promotion of Angel, which resulted in her being cast as the lead in Mispál's acclaimed character drama, Paths of Light (2005). The film premiered at the 36th Hungarian Film Week. For her performance, Cseh was nominated for Best Actress at the Syracuse International Film Festival.

In 2006 she played the double lead role in the British short film The Porter, alongside Bryan Ferry of Roxy Music and Max Beesley.

In 2007 Anna Marie Cseh again played opposite to legendary Hungarian actress Mari Törőcsik in the feature film Fragments, directed by Gyula Maár. Anna Marie also appeared in the World War II drama Good (2008), starring Viggo Mortensen.

After an academic hiatus, Anna Marie returned to cinema with short films Skinship, Equation for a Blind Date and Strawberries. She is now a regular on British television, having appeared in Law & Order: UK, Doctors and Coronation Street. In 2015, she returned to the big screen in Paolo Sorrentino's Youth. She debuted on the London stage Off West End in Dostoevsky's The Idiot (as Varya, at Theatre Collection).

== Filmography ==
Film
Year	Title	Role	Notes
2004	The Porter	The Girl	Short Film
2005	Paths of Light	Csilla	Feature Film - Nominated - Syracuse International Film Festival Best Actress
2007	Fragments		Feature Film
2008	Good	Beautiful Woman	Feature Film
2014	Law & Order: UK	Magda	Television, 1 episode
2014	Skinship	Mel	Short Film
2014	Doctors	Aliska Levchenko	Television, 1 episode
2014	Equation for a Blind Date	Erika Tlak	Short Film
2015	Coronation Street	Justine Fabler	Television, 1 episode
2015	Youth by Paolo Sorrentino	Career Woman	Feature Film
2018	Genesis	Hanna	Feature Film
