= We'll Take Manhattan (2012 film) =

- Cover art for the We'll Take Manhattan DVD
- Written by: John McKay
- Directed by: John McKay
- Starring: Karen Gillan; Aneurin Barnard; Helen McCrory; Frances Barber; Anna Chancellor; Allan Corduner; Robert Glenister; Alex Jennings; Natasha Little; Joseph May
- Music by: Kevin Sargent
- Country of origin: United Kingdom
- Original language: English

Production
- Producer: Rebecca Hodgson
- Cinematography: Tim Palmer
- Editor: David Charap
- Running time: 89 minutes
- Production company: Kudos for BBC/Ovation

Original release
- Network: BBC Four
- Release: 26 January 2012

We'll Take Manhattan is a British television film that tells the story of the extramarital affair between photographer David Bailey and model Jean Shrimpton, and their one-week photographic assignment in New York City for Vogue in 1962. Directed by John McKay, it stars Aneurin Barnard as Bailey and Karen Gillan as Shrimpton. The film was first broadcast on 26 January 2012 on BBC Four in the UK, and in the US on Ovation on 11 February 2012.

== Cast ==
- Aneurin Barnard as David Bailey
- Karen Gillan as Jean Shrimpton
- Helen McCrory as Lady Rendlesham
- Frances Barber as Diana Vreeland
- Anna Chancellor as Lucie Clayton
- Allan Corduner as Alex Liberman
- Robert Glenister as Ted Shrimpton
- Natasha Little as Peggy Shrimpton
- Alex Jennings as John Parsons
- Joseph May as Larry Schwartz

== Production ==
The film was shot in London and New York.

To recreate the 1962 Vogue cover shoot, the filmmakers used a variety of techniques, including using the same or near identical locations in Manhattan, as well as using a combination of props and computer-generated imagery.

== Soundtrack ==
Jazz music, composed by Kevin Sargent, is used throughout the film, reflecting David Bailey's love for the genre. Dedicated themes accompany each of the main protagonists.

== Reception ==
=== Critical response ===
Positive reviews lauded the performances of Aneurin Barnard, Karen Gillan, and Helen McCrory. The Arts Desk compared the film to 1960s period-themed shows like Mad Men and Pan Am, and also pointed out the presence of anachronisms in the film.

=== Accolades ===
The film received the award for Best European TV Drama at the Prix Europa awards in 2012.
