= Genesis (2018 Hungarian film) =

2018 film

- Film poster
- Directed by: Árpád Bogdán
- Written by: Árpád Bogdán
- Starring: Milán Csordás
- Music by: Mihály Víg
- Release dates: 18 February 2018 (Berlin); 12 April 2018 (Hungary)
- Running time: 120 minutes
- Country: Hungary
- Language: Hungarian

Genesis (Hungarian: Genezis) is a 2018 Hungarian drama film directed by Árpád Bogdán. It was screened in the Panorama section at the 68th Berlin International Film Festival.

== Cast ==
- Milán Csordás as Ricsi
- Anna Marie Cseh as Hanna
- Eniko Anna Illesi as Virág
- Lídia Danis as Mira
