= The Heart of Me (film) =

- Directed by: Thaddeus O'Sullivan
- Written by: Rosamond Lehmann; Lucinda Coxon
- Produced by: Martin Pope
- Starring: Helena Bonham Carter; Olivia Williams; Paul Bettany
- Cinematography: Gyula Pados
- Edited by: Alex Mackie
- Music by: Nicholas Hooper
- Production company: Martin Pope Productions BBC Films
- Distributed by: Paramount Pictures
- Release dates: 6 September 2002 (Toronto International Film Festival); 2 May 2003 (United Kingdom)
- Running time: 96 minutes
- Countries: United Kingdom; Germany
- Language: English

The Heart of Me is a 2002 British period drama film directed by Thaddeus O'Sullivan and starring Helena Bonham Carter, Paul Bettany and Olivia Williams. Set in London before and after World War II, it depicts the consequences of a woman's torrid affair with her sister's husband. The film is an adaptation of Rosamond Lehmann's 1953 novel The Echoing Grove.

== Plot ==
In 1934 after the funeral of her father, Madeleine, a proper and repressed well-to-do wife to Rickie, a man who obviously has more in common with his sister-in-law, Dinah, than with Madeleine, invites her free-spirited sister to stay with her and her husband Rickie in their elegant London home. The couple have a young son, Anthony.

Madeleine is and has always been secretly jealous and resentful of Dinah, a raffish bohemian painter, who is the despair of her conservative sister, but whose mother, Mrs. Burkett, acknowledges her faults but plainly admires her - though not as much as her departed father did. Mrs. Burkett says as much in private to Rickie, unaware that Madeleine has overheard. Realising it, however, she seems unperturbed, as if it is common knowledge and nothing to hide from Madeleine - despite the obvious hurt her more serious daughter feels upon hearing it spoken aloud so blatantly.

Madeleine at last contrives to get Dinah engaged to a respectable, well-off but buffoonish man, Charles. Dinah announces her engagement at a family dinner, but later that night Rickie, who has long harbored an attraction for her, tells her to end the engagement after Charles blithely remarks that Rickie had already nabbed “the pretty one.” Richie’s attraction to Dinah is certainly a strong motivator for his insistence that she break with Charles… but he also clearly thinks she deserves far better than this upper-class twit who has no appreciation for Dinah’s many qualities - including an indisputable - albeit quirky - beauty.

Rickie and Dinah fall in love and, during a New Year's Day party, they become lovers. Rickie helps Dinah to settle in an apartment that becomes their love nest, but leaves his marriage intact.

Things get complicated when Dinah gets pregnant. She decides to leave London with her friend Bridie and await the birth and Rickie's arrival in the south of England. During a snowstorm, Dinah gives birth to a stillborn daughter and almost dies from blood loss due to complications during the birth. Rickie, on his way to reach her, suffers a car accident and arrives too late.

Grief-stricken, Dinah turns Rickie away and ends their affair. Rickie becomes lost in despair, but tries to hide it (unsuccessfully) from Madeleine. Months later, Madeleine receives a letter in the mail from Bridie who writes of the affair, leading Madeleine to the realization of what had been going on for quite some time.

Confronted by Madeleine, Rickie is adamant that the affair is finished, but he is unapologetic. Eventually Rickie meets unexpectedly with Dinah. She has an emotional breakdown at a restaurant and Rickie, still in love with her, tells Madeleine that he is leaving her.

Things, however, take a turn for the worse when Rickie collapses and is taken to hospital, unbeknownst to Dinah who is still home waiting for him. Dinah is prevented from seeing Rickie and told by her mother and Madeleine that he has decided to return to his family, while they tell Rickie that she has gone back to France.

Several more months pass and the lovers eventually meet again when Dinah is leaving the apartment that was being financed by Rickie, and he discovers that she had been there the entire time and not in France. Dinah, who is too hurt by things past, refuses to continue the affair and the lovers part for the last time.

During the war (World War II), Anthony, Rickie's and Madeleine's son, dies in battle. Rickie is killed during an air raid while going to claim a bracelet for Dinah that he had ordered from a jewelry store with the engraving: "And throughout all eternity, I forgive you and you forgive me".

The film ends with Madeleine and Dinah finally reconciled to the past and learning to forgive each other.

== Cast ==
- Helena Bonham Carter as Dinah
- Olivia Williams as Madeleine
- Paul Bettany as Rickie
- Eleanor Bron as Mrs. Burkett
- Alison Reid as Bridie
- Luke Newberry as Anthony
- Tom Ward as Jack
- Gillian Hanna as Betty
- Andrew Havill as Charles

== Reception ==
=== Critical reception ===
The Heart of Me was filmed in the Isle of Man and premiered at Toronto International Film Festival on 6 September 2002. The movie had a mixed reception. In his review Roger Ebert wrote: "Many of the complaints have to do with the fact that the characters are wealthy and upper class and speak English elegantly. The names of Merchant and Ivory are used like clubs to beat the film. This is the same kind of thinking that led Jack Warner to tell his producers, "Don't give me any more pictures where they write with feathers." The movie is about the punishment of being trapped in a system where appearances are more important than reality."

"...Quite well done, with a fine cast finding time between tears, anger, deception and recriminations to do some surprisingly strong and affecting acting..." — Los Angeles Times.

"...The actors demonstrate such unmatchable Englishness that the movie – a kind of The End of the Affair without the religious instruction – takes on the gleam of a cultural artifact..." — Entertainment Weekly "...A film for the mind..." — Total Film

Rotten Tomatoes gives the film a critic score of 50%.

=== Awards ===
- British Independent Film Awards

Won Olivia Williams

Nominated Helena Bonham Carter

- ALFS awards:

Won Helena Bonham Carter

Nominated Paul Bettany
