= Clare Rendlesham =

British fashion editor and boutique manager

The Right Honourable The Lady Rendlesham
- Born: Clare Marian McCririck; 23 October 1919; Lancashire, England
- Died: February 1987; London, England
- Occupations: Magazine editor, fashion journalist
- Years active: 1950s–1980s
- Known for: Editor, UK Vogue
- Spouse(s): Charles Thellusson, 8th Baron Rendlesham
- Children: 4

Clare Marian Thellusson (née McCririck), Baroness Rendlesham (1919–1987), known as Clare Rendlesham, was a British fashion editor and boutique manager.

== Personal life ==
Born one of three children of Lieutenant Colonel Douglas H.G. McCririck (1893–1947) and Nora Muriel Rivett (1896–1975), in 1947 she became the second wife of Charles Thellusson, 8th Baron Rendlesham. Together they had four children, a son and three daughters: Charles William Brooke Thellusson (later 9th Baron Rendlesham), Sarah Ann, Antonia, and Jaqumine.

== Career ==
Rendlesham rose to prominence thanks to her eye for new fashion trends and her bold editorial choices. She became editor of both Vogue and Queen magazines. She had a reputation for being a difficult person to work with. Photographer Helmut Newton called her "thin as a rake and as hard as nails", while journalist Brenda Polan said "She was a monster. Most people were too scared even to talk to her."

In 1966, Rendlesham was fired from Queen after an infamous row with its owner, Jocelyn Stevens, which culminated in Rendlesham throwing her typewriter from the office window (other accounts say he "famously threw [her] suitcases through the office window"). When she left the publishing industry, she became a boutique owner. Rendlesham managed the first Yves St. Laurent, Chloé and Karl Lagerfeld shops in London.

== Legacy ==
Helen McCrory portrayed Rendlesham in the 2012 movie, We'll Take Manhattan.
