= Shades (TV series) =

British TV series

Shades was a six-part British television series starring Stephen Tompkinson and Dervla Kirwan, who previously starred together on Ballykissangel. It was produced by ITV and Coastal Productions but ITV never aired the mini series in the UK. It was only shown in the US on PBS and in Ontario, Canada because of the PBS affiliate in Buffalo, New York that is received across the border. It was also broadcast in Australia on the ABC. The DVD was released in February 2012 by Acorn Media.

The series involves Mark and Maeve, who did not previously know each other, dying on the same day in separate incidents, then finding themselves continuing to exist as ghosts, or shades. After their deaths, they learn there are some rules to this existence. One is that they can interact somewhat with the living: Those they'd never met while alive forget any interaction as soon as it is over; and they cannot interact at all with anyone who did know them; yet they can observe them. Mark and Maeve's frustration intensifies at not being capable of intervening directly in their loved one's lives. Instead they must find a way to do so indirectly, which is tricky and involves creative manipulations. From this they realize they are a shade of their former selves: Still conscious, yet diminished on the physical plane. The series follows their attempts to set things right in the lives of new people they encounter, because of the unique advantage they have of being able to see circumstances of which these people are not aware, and also their attempts to resolve the mess their own lives were in when they abruptly died.

Within the context of the central theme, the series manages to cover several serious sub-themes. Mark and Maeve help a long-married elderly couple who are facing death find redemption by exploring the meaning of honesty and forgiveness in their relationship. Mark helps a young couple on the brink of marriage and commitment to appreciate and embrace the blessings in their lives. A young nanny learns to accept responsibility for the unintended outcome of a relationship with her married employer. Throughout, Mark agonizes over being able to approach the children he left behind, while being unable to truly bridge the gap between life and death. Finally, the unexpected ending touches on the need to accept the changes life thrusts upon us and let go in order to allow ourselves — and our loved ones — to move forward.
