= And a Nightingale Sang =

1977 play by CP Taylor

DVD cover of And a Nightingale Sang

And a Nightingale Sang is a play by British playwright C.P. Taylor (1977) and commissioned by Newcastle upon Tyne's Live Theatre Company. Described as a bitter-sweet comedy, the play is set in Newcastle during World War II and portrays Helen Stott and her family as they cope on the home front with life during the war. The play's name is derived from a popular war-time song sung by Vera Lynn called "A Nightingale Sang in Berkeley Square".

The play has frequently been produced both in Britain and the US. It was made into a television film in 1989 by Jack Rosenthal for Tyne Tees Television, which was produced by Philip Hinchcliffe, executive-produced by Victor Glynn and directed by Rob Knights. It starred Joan Plowright, Phyllis Logan, John Woodvine, Stephen Tompkinson and Tom Watt. It won many awards including the prestigious Prix Europa in 1990.

== Plot ==
As the youngest of the family, Joyce is preoccupied with her love life. She wants to be married but can't make up her mind to accept Eric, who has just joined up and is eager to settle the matter before he is posted abroad. As Joyce's confidante, Helen tolerates her sister's agonies of indecision while hiding her own frustration. With her pronounced limp, Helen assumes that no man will ever want her.

The elder members of the family pursue their diversions from the daily routine. With George (Dad), it is his addiction to the piano which he plays with more enthusiasm than skill. "Mam" takes refuge in her fervent Catholicism while Andie (Grandad) has more regard for his pets than for his family.

When they hear the air raid siren for the first time, the Stotts are in confusion, stuffing tablecloths under the back door to stop the poison gas, desperately chasing about for gas masks and diving under the table when a long high whistle warns of an approaching bomb. By the time that Helen realizes that the whistle is actually from the kettle that Mam had put on for a cup of tea, Joyce has made up her mind to marry Eric.
