= C. P. Taylor =

Scottish playwright

Cecil Philip Taylor (6 November 1929 – 9 December 1981) usually credited as C.P. Taylor, was a Scottish playwright. He wrote almost 80 plays during his 16 years as a professional playwright, including several for radio and television. He also made a number of documentary programmes for the BBC. His plays tended to draw on his Jewish background and his Socialist Marxist viewpoint, and to be written in dialect.

== Personal life ==
Taylor was born on 6 November 1929 in Glasgow and grew up in the Crosshill district of Govanhill, in a politically radical Jewish family with strong ties to the Labour Party. His parents had emigrated from Russia. He left Queen's Park Secondary School at the age of 14 and began his working life as a radio and television repairman.

In 1955, when he was 26, he met his first wife, Irene Diamond, in a drama group. In order for them to afford to marry, he took a job as a record salesman in Newcastle, the city where his mother had grown up. He and Irene lived there, in Fenham, for many years and had two children, Avram and Clare.

In 1967 he married Elizabeth Screen, with whom he also had two children, David and Catheryn. Shortly after their marriage, he and Elizabeth settled at the village of Longhorsley in Northumberland, where he lived until his death on 9 December 1981. He is buried in St. Helen's Church graveyard in the village. His death from pneumonia has been attributed to his habit of writing in his garden shed.

== Plays ==
His first play Mr David (1954) won second prize in a playwriting competition organized by the World Jewish Congress. Unperformed until 1966, a production was arranged by the Jewish State Theatre in Warsaw.

Aa Went Tae Blaydon Races, a historical drama about a miners' strike on Tyneside in 1862, was the first play by Taylor to be premiered by a professional theatre company. It opened the new Flora Robson Theatre in Newcastle in 1962.

A long relationship with the Traverse Theatre in Edinburgh began in 1965, enabling Taylor to leave his day job and concentrate on his work as a dramatist. The first play for the Traverse was Happy Days Are Here Again, followed by Bread and Butter (1966), Lies about Vietnam (1969), The Black and White Minstrels (1972), Next Year in Tel Aviv (1973), Schippel (1974), Gynt (1975), Walter (1975), and Withdrawal Symptoms (1978).

By the late 1970s, Taylor became increasingly involved with the Live Theatre Company in Newcastle, which premiered several of his plays, among them Some Enchanted Evening (1977), Bandits (1977), Operation Elvis (1978), And a Nightingale Sang (1978) – a bitter-sweet comedy set in wartime Tyneside – and The Saints Go Marching In (1980 – later known as Bring Me Sunshine, Bring Me Smiles').

In The Peter Pan Man (Scottish Youth Theatre 1978) he transferred the play by J. M. Barrie to an Elswick estate.

His most successful play is probably Good (1981), in which a liberal German Professor of German literature, Halder, becomes involved with the Third Reich war machine and Auschwitz through moral cowardice and subtle corruption. Halder, however, continues to see himself as a 'good man' even as he is drawn further and further into Hitler's nightmare. Good was first staged by the Royal Shakespeare Company at the Donmar Warehouse in September 1981, with Alan Howard, as Halder, winning both the Evening Standard Award and the Plays and Players Best Actor awards. The play is frequently revived; in March 1999, also at the Donmar Warehouse, Charles Dance played the leading role. In 2023, it was produced in London's Harold Pinter theatre, with David Tennant as Halder.

== Film and television versions of his plays ==
- In 1989, playwright Jack Rosenthal made a posthumous adaptation for television of And a Nightingale Sang. This Tyne Tees Television production starred Joan Plowright, Phyllis Logan, John Woodvine, Stephen Tompkinson, and Tom Watt, and won a Prix Europa in 1990.
- In 2008, Good was released as a feature film, with Viggo Mortensen in the role of Halder and Jason Isaacs playing his Jewish friend Glückstein.

== Awards ==
- The World Jewish Congress Playwriting Prize (1954)
- Arts Council Playwright's bursary (1965)
- Scottish Television Theatre Award (1969)
