= Further Adventures of Lucky Jim =

1967 British TV comedy series

- Genre: Comedy
- Based on: Lucky Jim by Kingsley Amis
- Written by: Dick Clement; Ian La Frenais
- Starring: Keith Barron; Colin Jeavons
- Country of origin: United Kingdom
- Original language: English
- No. of series: 1
- No. of episodes: 7

Production
- Producer: Duncan Wood
- Running time: 30 minutes
- Production company: BBC

Original release
- Network: BBC One
- Release: 2 May – 13 June 1967

Further Adventures of Lucky Jim or The New Adventures of Lucky Jim is a comedy television series which first aired on BBC1 in 1967. Inspired by the novel Lucky Jim by Kingsley Amis, it updates the story from the early 1950s of the novel to mid-1960s Swinging London. It stars Keith Barron as the young university lecturer Jim Dixon. The scriptwriters wrote a belated sequel The Further Adventures of Lucky Jim starring Enn Reitel in 1982.

The majority of the episodes are now considered lost. In 2024 audio recordings were found for several missing episodes from the series. These episodes are entitled 'Jim's In', 'Jim Cleans Up', 'Look Why Don't We Go Back To My Place?' and 'Jim Freaks Out'.

Other actors who appeared in the series include Suzy Kendall, Nerys Hughes, John Le Mesurier, Francis Matthews, Eunice Gayson, John Junkin, Donald Hewlett, William Kendall, Robert Raglan, Felix Bowness, Janina Faye, Patrick Newell, Diana King and Michael Balfour.

== Main cast ==
- Keith Barron as Jim Dixon
- Colin Jeavons as Brian

== Bibliography ==
- David Pringle. Imaginary People: A Who's who of Fictional Characters from the Eighteenth Century to the Present Day. Scolar Press, 1996.
