= Live Theatre Company =

Theatre in Newcastle upon Tyne, England

Coordinates: 54.9700°N 1.6049°W

Live Theatre
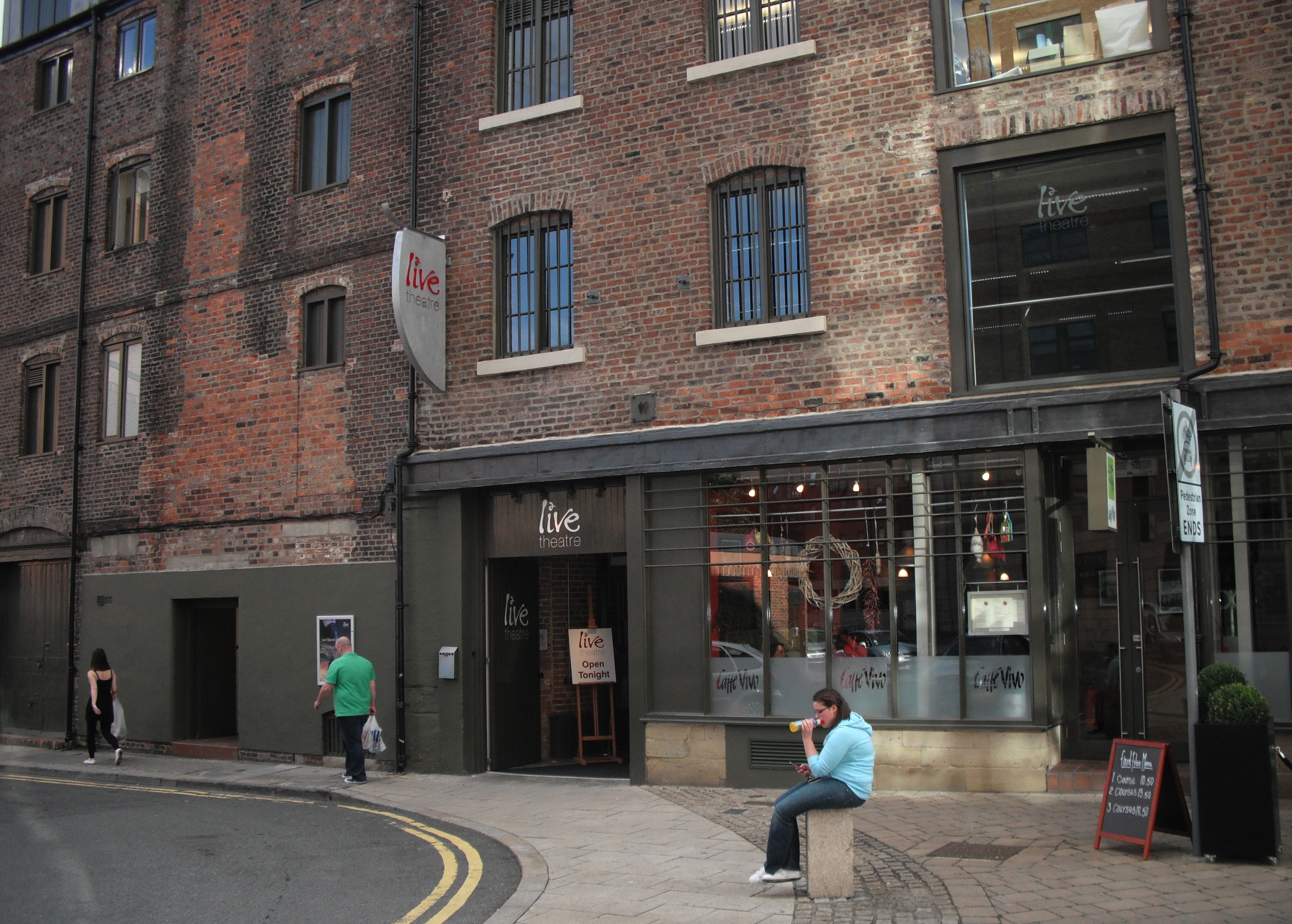
- Live Theatre, in August 2010
- Interactive map of Live Theatre
- Address: Broad Chare, Quayside; Newcastle upon Tyne; United Kingdom
- Capacity: 170

Construction
- Opened: 1982

Website
- live.org.uk

Live Theatre, formerly Live Theatre Company, is a new writing theatre and company based in Newcastle upon Tyne, England. As well as producing and presenting new plays many of which go on to tour nationally and internationally, it seeks out and nurtures creative talent and runs a large education programme for young people.

== History ==
Originally founded in Tyneside in 1973 by Val McLane, Geoff Gillham and Dave Clark, the company originally toured its work regionally to non-traditional theatre settings, such as community halls and working men's clubs. The company was creating plays and stories that were relevant to the North East community and sought to break down barriers by presenting this work to ordinary working-class people within their own communities.

The company has been based in Newcastle Quayside since 1982, expanding over the years to occupy the current premises which combine converted warehouses and Almshouses to create a building which houses a theatre auditorium, café bar, rehearsal spaces and administrative offices. Live Theatre also took over the lease of a new warehouse building on Broad Chare, immediately adjacent to the previous theatre. In 2007 Live Theatre underwent a further capital development. It now has a cabaret style theatre, a studio theatre, renovated rehearsal rooms, a series of dedicated writer's rooms as well as a café, bar and gastro pub, The Broad Chare, all in a restored and refurbished complex of five Grade II listed buildings.

== Productions ==
Live Theatre develops new writing talent in the region. The company has enjoyed significant relationships with many writers such as CP Taylor, Tom Hadaway, Alan Plater and, more recently, Peter Flannery, Michael Chaplin, Peter Straughan, Julia Darling, Lee Hall, Sean O'Brien and Karen Laws. Many plays have been commissioned and produced over the years which are now known nationally and internationally, such as Close The Coalhouse Door, Cooking with Elvis, Operation Elvis and And a Nightingale Sang.

In 2013 Live Theatre celebrated 40 years of creating plays on Tyneside with a programme that included a new national tour of Lee Hall's The Pitmen Painters by Bill Kenwright Limited, and sell out runs at Live Theatre of Tyne by Michael Chaplin, Wet House by new talent Paddy Campbell and a revival of Lee Hall's Cooking with Elvis. Wet House successfully transferred to the Soho Theatre in 2014.

Between January and June 2014 Live Theatre presented a series screenplays in development by writer Lee Hall, which includes scrips in development about English cricketer Harold Larwood, a film adaptation of Down and Out in Paris and London based on the book by George Orwell, Rocket Man about the life of pop star Elton John and Victoria and Abdul based on the life of Queen Victoria and her manservant and For The End of Time based on the life and works of French composer Messiaen. All were read as script-in-hand readings in Live Theatre's main theatre.

Incognito by Nick Payne was a co-production between Live Theatre, nabokov, HighTide Festival Theatre and in association with The North Wall, Oxford in spring 2014, which previewed at Live Theatre in April 2014, before going to HighTide Festival and The North Wall. It returned to Live Theatre in May 2014 and then had a sell-out run at The Bush Theatre, London.

Live Theatre's 2013 show Captain Amazing written by Bruntwood Prize winning author Alistair McDowall, directed by Clive Judd and starring Mark Weinman returned to Live Theatre in May 2014 and was performed at Northern Stage's Kings Hall Edinburgh venue for a week as part of the Edinburgh Festival Fringe.

In November 2014 Live Theatre premiered Flying into Daylight, a new play by Emmy-award-winning screenwriter Ron Hutchinson. Drawn from a true story, the play features live Tango music created and performed by Tango musician Julian Rowlands and dance choreographed by Amir Giles.

== Awards ==
In 2017 Live Theatre productions Our Ladies of Perpetual Succour, written by Lee Hall and co-produced with National Theatre of Scotland, was nominated for two Olivier Awards, winning the Olivier Award for Best New Comedy, whilst all the all female cast of Melissa Allan, Caroline Deyga, Kirsty Findlay, Karen Fishwick, Kirsty Maclaren, Frances Mayli McCann, Joanne McGuiness and Dawn Sievewright were jointly nominated for the Olivier Award of Best Actress in a Supporting role. The show then went on to complete a West End run at the Duke of York's Theatre, London.

The Red Lion by Patrick Marber, starring Stephen Tompkinson, had successful runs at Live Theatre and on a West End transfer, and was nominated for an Olivier Award for Outstanding Achievement in an Affiliate Theatre.

== Live Tales ==
The theatre also hosts a free creative writing programme for KS2 and KS3 students called Live Tales in studios behind the theatre in Newcastle and at The Fire Station, Sunderland.

== Live Youth Theatre ==
Live Theatre runs the largest free youth theatre group in the North East of England, which runs weekly sessions for young people of mixed ability ages 11–25. Live Youth Theatre was founded in 1998 by Live Theatre's current Senior Creative Associate Children and Young People, Paul James at the request of then Artistic Director Max Roberts, and has notable alumni including Laura Norton, Dean Bone, and Natalie Jamieson

== Staff ==
The current Artistic Director of Live Theatre is Jack McNamara.

Max Roberts, Artistic Director until 2018, is currently Emeritus Artistic Director, and also lectures at the University of Sunderland.

Chief Executive of Live Theatre is Jacqui Kell.
