= Helen McCrory =

English actress (1968–2021)

Helen McCrory OBE
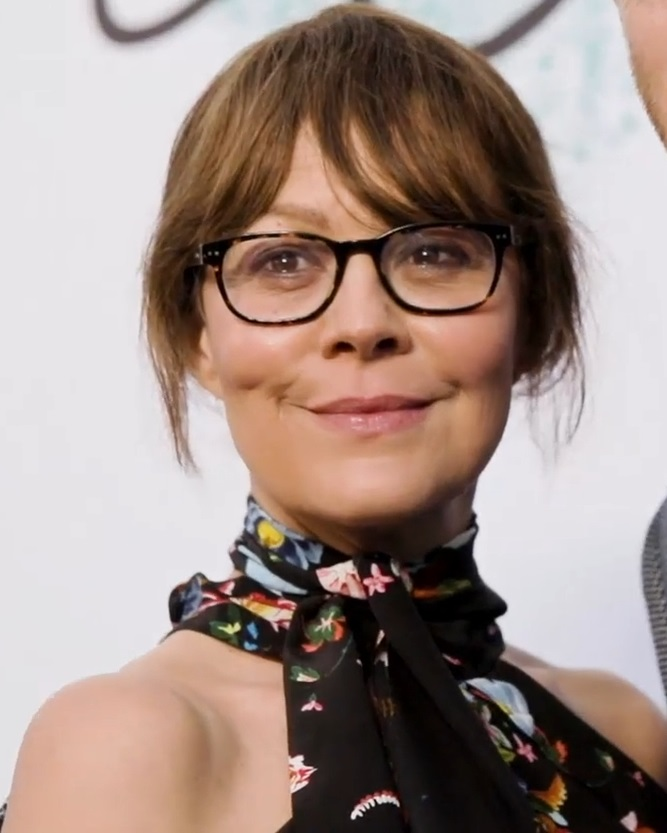
- McCrory in 2017
- Born: Helen Elizabeth McCrory; 17 August 1968; London, England
- Died: 16 April 2021 (aged 52); London, England
- Education: Drama Centre London
- Occupation: Actress
- Years active: 1990–2021
- Spouse: Damian Lewis (m. 2007)
- Children: 2

Helen Elizabeth McCrory (17 August 1968 – 16 April 2021) was an English actress. After studying at the Drama Centre London, she made her professional stage debut in The Importance of Being Earnest in 1990. Other theatre roles include playing Lady Macbeth in Macbeth at Shakespeare's Globe, Olivia in Twelfth Night, Rosalind in As You Like It in the West End for which she received a Laurence Olivier Award nomination, and Medea in the eponymous play at the Royal National Theatre.

McCrory is known for her film roles as Françoise in Charlotte Gray (2001); Cherie Blair in both The Queen (2006) and The Special Relationship (2010), alongside Michael Sheen, who portrayed husband and Prime Minister Tony Blair in both; Narcissa Malfoy in the final three Harry Potter films (2009, 2010, 2011); Mama Jeanne in Hugo (2011); and Clair Dowar in the James Bond film Skyfall (2012). She was also known for her television roles as Polly Gray in the BBC series Peaky Blinders (2013–2019); Madame Kali in the Showtime series Penny Dreadful (2014–15); Emma Banville in the ITV series Fearless (2017); and Kathryn Villiers in the BBC mini-series MotherFatherSon (2019).

== Early life and education ==
Helen Elizabeth McCrory was born on 17 August 1968 in Paddington, London. Her mother, Ann (née Morgans), was a Welsh physiotherapist, and her father, Iain McCrory, was a diplomat from Glasgow; they were married in 1968. She was the eldest of three children.

McCrory was educated at Queenswood School near Hatfield, Hertfordshire, then spent a year living in Italy. Upon her return to Britain, she began studying acting at the Drama Centre in London.

== Career ==
McCrory won third prize at the Ian Charleson Awards for her 1993 performance as Rose Trelawny in Trelawny of the 'Wells' at the National Theatre. In 2002, she was nominated for a London Evening Standard Theatre Award for Best Actress (for playing Elena in Chekhov's Uncle Vanya at the Donmar Warehouse). She was later nominated for a 2006 Laurence Olivier Theatre Award for her role as Rosalind in As You Like It in the West End. In April 2008, McCrory made a "compelling" Rebecca West in a production of Ibsen's Rosmersholm at the Almeida Theatre, London. She appeared in Charles II: The Power and The Passion (2003), as Barbara Villiers, Countess of Castlemaine and in supporting roles in such films as Interview with the Vampire (1994), Charlotte Gray (2001), The Count of Monte Cristo (2002) and Casanova (2005). In the critically acclaimed film The Queen (2006), she played Cherie Blair, a role she reprised in Peter Morgan's follow-up The Special Relationship (2010).

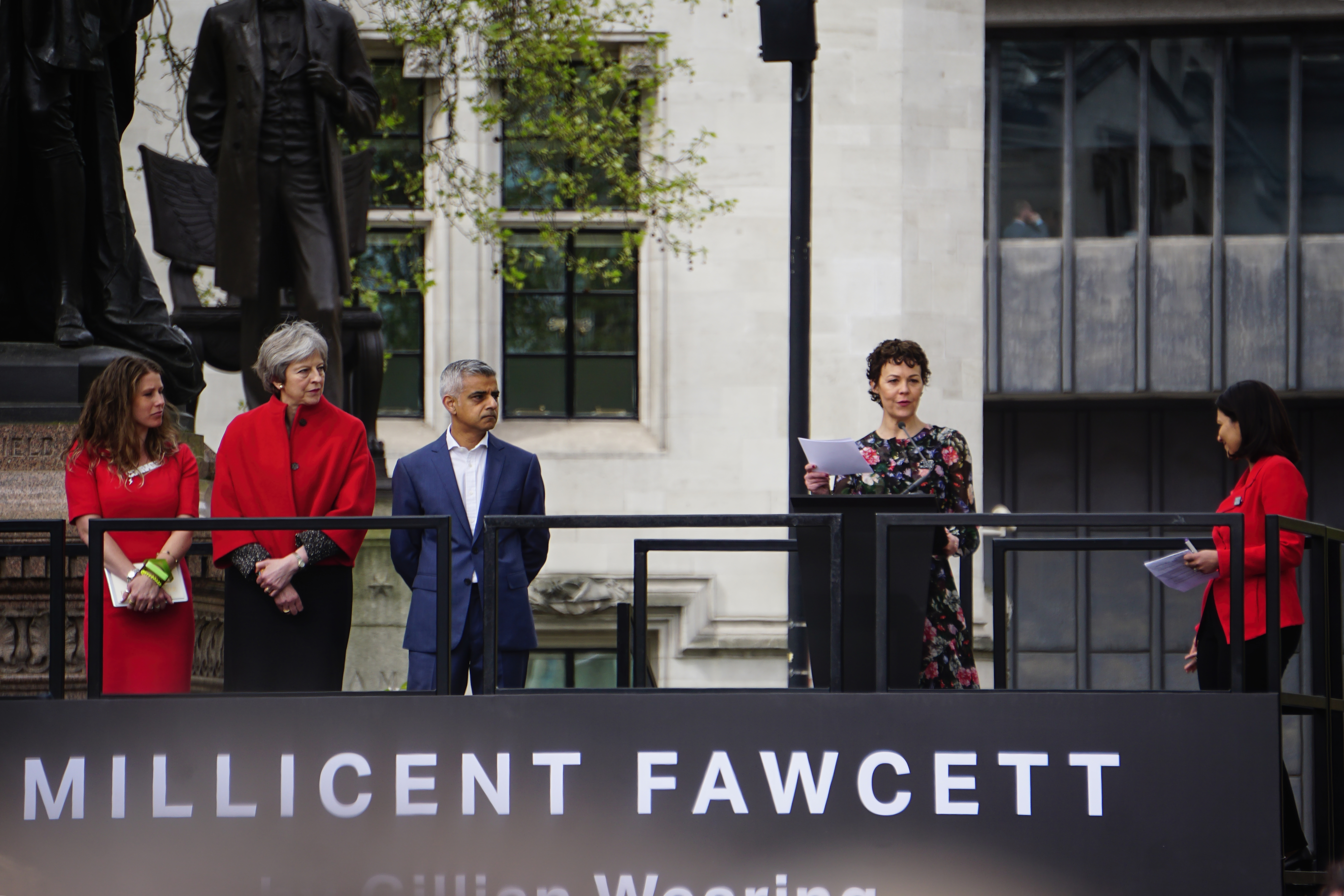
McCrory speaking at the unveiling of a statue of suffragist Millicent Fawcett in Parliament Square, London in 2018

She appeared in a modernised television adaptation of Frankenstein (2007). In 2006, her first pregnancy forced her to pull out of Harry Potter and the Order of the Phoenix (2007), in which she had been cast as Bellatrix Lestrange (she was replaced by Helena Bonham Carter). McCrory was later cast as Bellatrix's sister Narcissa Malfoy in Harry Potter and the Half-Blood Prince, released in July 2009. In 2010 and 2011, she reprised her role in the final films, Harry Potter and the Deathly Hallows – Part 1 and Harry Potter and the Deathly Hallows – Part 2. She also played the principal villain role of Rosanna Calvierri in the 2010 episode "The Vampires of Venice" of the BBC television series Doctor Who.

McCrory starred in The Last of the Haussmans alongside Julie Walters and Rory Kinnear at the Royal National Theatre, which began 12 June 2012. The production was broadcast to cinemas around the world on 11 October 2012 through the National Theatre Live programme. In the same year, she also appeared in the twenty-third James Bond film Skyfall as Clair Dowar MP. McCrory also played lead role, wedding director Julie Ranmore, in the three-part ITV drama Leaving. In 2013, McCrory narrated poetry for The Love Book App, an interactive anthology of love literature developed by Allie Byrne Esiri. Again in 2013, she played Lady Macbeth in Macbeth at the Little Angel Theatre. The same year, she began playing Polly Gray in Peaky Blinders, which she continued to star in alongside Cillian Murphy for 5 series until 2019. In 2020, she was set to star in the final series of Peaky Blinders until production was shut down five days before filming was set to begin in March due to the COVID-19 pandemic. When production resumed in January 2021, she was unable to return due to breast cancer and the script had to be rewritten following her death. She appears in series 6 through archive and unreleased footage.

In 2014, McCrory played the title role in the National Theatre's production of Medea, directed by Carrie Cracknell. Her performance was critically acclaimed. Also in 2014, she made a guest appearance on the TV series Penny Dreadful. She returned as a regular for the show's second season, playing the main antagonist. In 2014, McCrory also starred in A Little Chaos, opposite Kate Winslet and Alan Rickman who also directed the film. In 2016, she starred as Hester in the stage play The Deep Blue Sea, which was filmed and shown live in cinemas worldwide on 1 September 2016 as part of National Theatre Live. McCrory was confirmed to play the lead role, human-rights lawyer Emma Banville, in six-part ITV drama series Fearless, which aired in June 2017.

In 2019, McCrory starred as Kathryn Villiers in Tom Rob Smith's MotherFatherSon alongside Richard Gere and Billy Howle. It averaged 2.69 million viewers. In 2020, she played Sonia Woodley QC in the ITV drama Quiz, which received a large audience while it was on the air during the height of the COVID-19 pandemic lockdowns with the first episode seen live by an average of 5.3 million viewers in the UK. In June 2020, McCrory was featured in an episode of the BBC Radio 4's programme Desert Island Discs; Donna Ferguson from The Guardian called the episode one of five key shows in the programme's 80 year history. In her final television performance, she starred as Prime Minister Dawn Ellison in the BBC four-part drama Roadkill, which aired in October 2020. Her final performance was in the animated biographical film Charlotte, which premiered at the Toronto International Film Festival in 2021 and was released in 2022.

== Personal life ==
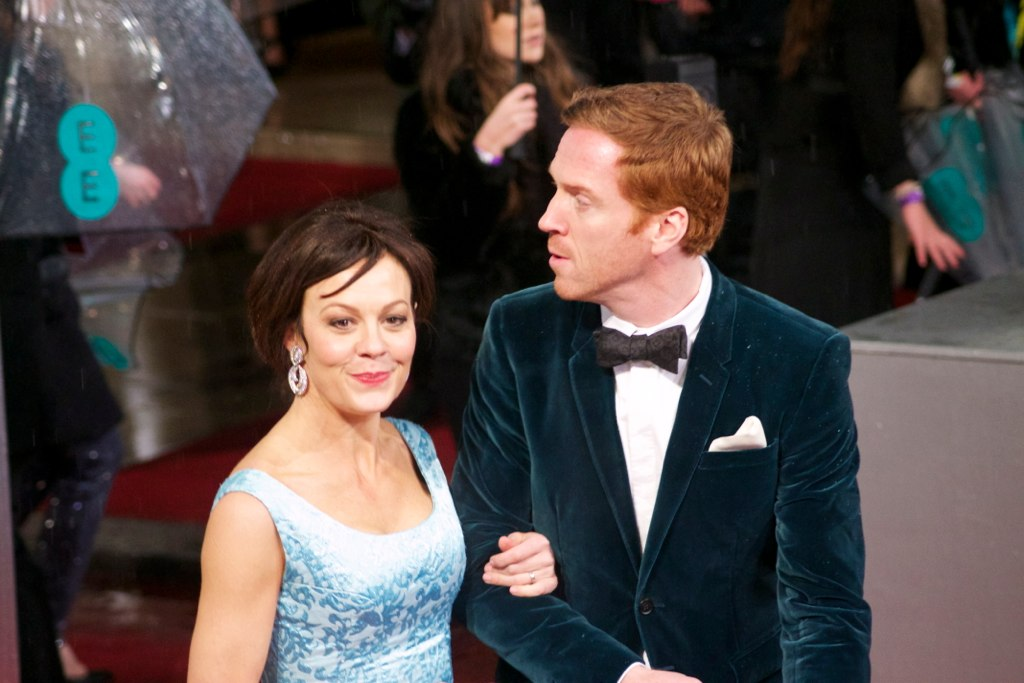
McCrory and Damian Lewis at the 2013 BAFTA Awards

On 4 July 2007, McCrory married actor Damian Lewis; the couple had a daughter, Manon (born 2006), and a son, Gulliver (born 2007). Their main home was in Tufnell Park, north London, and they had another near Sudbury in Suffolk.

=== Philanthropy ===
McCrory served as an honorary patron of the London children's charity Scene & Heard. She also served as patron for the charity Sir Hubert von Herkomer (HVH) Arts Foundation, dedicated to offering youth a gateway to the arts, which her husband Damian Lewis took over as patron in 2021 following her death. During the COVID-19 pandemic, she and Lewis supported Feed NHS, a programme to give food from high-street restaurants to NHS staff, and had raised £1 million for the charity by early April 2020. In 2022, Lewis received a Commander of the Order of the British Empire (CBE) partially for their charity work with the NHS, which he shared with McCrory by posting to Twitter with the hashtag #CBESharingItWithHelen and telling the PA news agency "She and I are both thrilled". McCrory was also an ambassador with the charity The Prince's Trust, which she spoke about on Good Morning Britain in her final public appearance in March 2021.

== Death ==
McCrory died of breast cancer at her home in London on 16 April 2021, aged 52. Announcing the death on Twitter, husband Damian Lewis stated that she had died "peacefully at home, surrounded by a wave of love from friends and family." She had kept her diagnosis private while receiving treatment and continuing to work. "Very, very few people" knew of her illness before her death as she did not want her illness to overshadow her professional and charitable work.

Following her death, the storyline for season 6 of Peaky Blinders had to be altered and certain parts were reshot. In addition to Peaky Blinders, her last appearances include the 2016 stage production of The Deep Blue Sea at the National Theatre, an episode of the show Have I Got News For You in 2019, two series of the drama His Dark Materials, the 2020 ITV drama Quiz, the BBC drama Roadkill, and the animated film Charlotte.

== Acting credits ==
=== Film ===
Year	Title	Role	Notes	Ref.
1994	Interview with the Vampire	2nd Mistress		
1994	Uncovered	Lola		
1997	The James Gang	Bernadette James		
1998	Dad Savage	Chris		
2000	Hotel Splendide	Lorna Bull		
2001	Charlotte Gray	Francoise		
2002	The Count of Monte Cristo	Valentina Villefort		
2002	Deep Down	Dana	Short film	
2003	Does God Play Football	Sarah Ward	Short film	
2004	Enduring Love	Mrs. Logan		
2005	Casanova	Casanova's Mother		
2006	Normal for Norfolk	Clare	Short film	
2006	The Queen	Cherie Blair		
2007	Becoming Jane	Mrs. Radcliffe		
2008	Flashbacks of a Fool	Peggy Tickell		
2009	Harry Potter and the Half-Blood Prince	Narcissa Malfoy		
2009	Fantastic Mr. Fox	Mrs. Bean (voice)		
2010	4.3.2.1.	Mrs. Jones		
2010	Harry Potter and the Deathly Hallows – Part 1	Narcissa Malfoy		
2011	Harry Potter and the Deathly Hallows – Part 2	Narcissa Malfoy		
2011	Hugo	Mama Jeanne (Jehanne D'Alcy)		
2012	Flying Blind	Dr. Frankie Lethbridge		
2012	Skyfall	Clair Dowar MP		
2014	A Little Chaos	Madame Françoise Le Nôtre		
2015	The Woman in Black: Angel of Death	Jean Hogg		
2015	Bill	Queen Elizabeth I		
2016	Their Finest	Sophie Smith		
2017	Loving Vincent	Louise Chevalier (voice)		
2021	Charlotte	Paula Lindberg-Salomon (voice)	Posthumous release	

=== Television ===
Year	Title	Role	Notes	Ref.
1993	Full Stretch	Vicki Goodall	Episode: "Risky Business"	
1993	Performance	Jean Rice	Episode: "The Entertainer"	
1995	Screen Two	Jo	Episode: "Streetlife"	
1995	Dirty Old Town	Claire	Television film	
1996	The Fragile Heart	Nicola Pascoe	3 episodes	
1996	Witness Against Hitler	Freya von Moltke	Television film	
1997	Trial & Retribution	Anita Harris	2 episodes	
1998	Spoonface Steinberg	Mother	Television film	
1998	Stand and Deliver	Christina	Television special	
1999	Split Second	Angie Anderson	Television film	
2000	Anna Karenina	Anna Karenina	4 episodes	
2000	North Square	Rose Fitzgerald	10 episodes	
2001	In a Land of Plenty	Mary Freeman	3 episodes	
2002	The Jury	Rose Davies	6 episodes	
2002	Dickens	Kate Dickens	3 episodes	
2002	Dead Gorgeous	Antonia Ashton	Television film	
2003	Lucky Jim	Margaret Peel	Television film	
2003	Carla	Carla French	Television film	
2003	Charles II: The Power and the Passion	Lady Castlemaine (Barbara Villiers)	4 episodes	
2004	Sherlock Holmes and the Case of the Silk Stocking	Jenny Vandeleur	Television film	
2005	Messiah: The Harrowing	Dr. Rachel Price	3 episodes	
2007	Frankenstein	Dr. Victoria Frankenstein	Television film	
2009	Life	Amanda Puryer	5 episodes	
2010	Doctor Who	Rosanna Calvierri	Episode: "The Vampires of Venice"	
2010	The Special Relationship	Cherie Blair	Television film	
2011	Phineas and Ferb	Lucy Fletcher (voice)	Episode: "My Fair Goalie"	
2012	We'll Take Manhattan	Lady Clare Rendlesham	Television film	
2012	Leaving	Julie Ranmore	Main role; 3 episodes	
2013–2022	Peaky Blinders	Polly Gray	Main role (Series 1-5); Archive footage (Series 6); 30 episodes	
2014	Inside No. 9	Tabitha	Episode: "The Harrowing"	
2014	Tommy Cooper: Not Like That, Like This	Mary Kay	Television film	
2014–2015	Penny Dreadful	Evelyn Poole (Madame Kali)	Recurring (Season 1); Main role (Season 2); 12 episodes	
2017	Fearless	Emma Banville	Main role; 6 episodes	
2019	MotherFatherSon	Kathryn Villiers	Main role; 8 episodes	
2019	Have I Got News for You	Herself (host)	Episode #58.7	
2019–2020	His Dark Materials	Stelmaria (voice)	Voice cast (Series 1-2); 4 episodes	
2020	Quiz	Sonia Woodley QC	Main role; 2 episodes	
2020	Roadkill	Dawn Ellison	Main role; 4 episodes	

=== Theatre ===
Year	Title	Role	Venue(s)	Ref.
1990	The Importance of Being Earnest	Gwendolen Fairfax	Harrogate Theatre	
1990	Teechers	Gail Saunders	Harrogate Theatre	
1990	Macbeth	Witch	Riverside Studios	
1991	Pride and Prejudice	Lydia Bennet		
1991	Blood Wedding	The Bride		
1992	Fuente Ovejuna	Jacinta		
1992	Don't Fool With Love	Camille		
1993	Trelawny of the 'Wells'	Rose Trelawny		
1994	Venice Preserved	Belvidera	Royal Exchange Theatre	
1994	The Seagull	Nina Mikhailovna Zarechnaya	Olivier Theatre	
1994–1995	The Devil's Disciple	Judith Anderson	National Theatre	
1995	Keely And Du	Keely	Olympia Theatre	
1995	Macbeth	Lady Macbeth	Shakespeare's Globe	
1995–1996	Les Enfants du paradis	Claire "Garance" Reine	Barbican Theatre	
1998	In a Little World of Our Own	Deborah	Donmar Warehouse	
1998	How I Learned to Drive	Li'I Bit	Donmar Warehouse	
1999	The Triumph of Love	Princess Leonide (alias Phocion)	Almeida Theatre	
2000–2001	Platonov	Anna Petrovna	Almeida Theatre	
2002	Uncle Vanya	Helena Andreyevna Serebryakova (Yelena)	Donmar Warehouse	
2002	Twelfth Night	Olivia	Donmar Warehouse	
2003–2004	Five Gold Rings	Miranda	Almeida Theatre	
2004	Old Times	Anna	Donmar Warehouse	
2005	As You Like It	Rosalind	Wyndham's Theatre	
2008	Rosmersholm	Rebecca West	Almeida Theatre	
2010–2012	The Late Middle Classes	Celia Smithers	Donmar Warehouse	
2012	The Last of the Haussmans	Libby Haussmans	Lyttelton Theatre	
2014	Medea	Medea	Olivier Theatre	
2016	The Deep Blue Sea	Hester Collyer	Lyttelton Theatre	

== Awards and honours ==
In 2016, McCrory received an honorary doctorate from the University of York. In 2017, she was appointed an Officer of the Order of the British Empire (OBE) in the 2017 New Year Honours for services to drama.

Year	Title	Award	Category	Result
1991	Blood Wedding	Manchester Evening News Theatre Awards	Best Actress	Won
1993	Trelawny of the 'Wells'	Ian Charleson Award	Best Actress	3rd place
1995	Macbeth	Shakespeare Globe Awards	Richard Burton Award For Most Promising Newcomer	Won
1995	Streetlife	Monte-Carlo Television Festival	Best Actress	Won
1995	Streetlife	Royal Television Society	Best Actress	Won
1997	Streetlife	BAFTA Cymru	Best Actress	Won
1997	The Fragile Heart	London Film Critics' Circle	Actress of the Year	Nominated
2001	North Square	London Film Critics' Circle	Best Actress	Won
2001	North Square	Broadcasting Press Guild Awards	Best Actress	Won
2002	Uncle Vanya	Evening Standard Theatre Awards	Best Actress	Nominated
2003	Uncle Vanya	Drama Desk Awards	Outstanding Featured Actress in a Play	Nominated
2003	Uncle Vanya	WhatsOnStage Awards	Best Actress in a Play	Nominated
2004	Charles II: The Power and The Passion	Satellite Awards	Best Supporting Actress – Series, Miniseries or Television Film	Nominated
2005	Charles II: The Power and The Passion	L.A. Television Awards	Best Actress	Nominated
2006	As You Like It	WhatsOnStage Awards	Best Actress in a Play	Nominated
2006	As You Like It	Laurence Olivier Award	Best Actress	Nominated
2007	The Queen	London Film Critics' Circle	Supporting Actress of the Year	Nominated
2008	Rosmersholm	Evening Standard Theatre Awards	Best Actress (longlisted)	Nominated
2011	The Late Middle Classes	WhatsOnStage Awards	Best Actress in a Play	Nominated
2012	The Late Middle Classes	Royal Television Society	Best Actress	Nominated
2012	Harry Potter and the Deathly Hallows–Part 2	Gold Derby Awards	Ensemble Cast	Nominated
2012	The Last of the Haussmans	Evening Standard Theatre Awards	Best Actress	Nominated
2013	The Last of the Haussmans	Glamour Awards	Theatre Actress of the Year	Won
2013	The Last of the Haussmans	WhatsOnStage Awards	Best Supporting Actress in a Play	Nominated
2013	The Last of the Haussmans	Laurence Olivier Award	Best Actress in a Supporting Role	Nominated
2014	Peaky Blinders	Biarritz International Festival of Audiovisual Programming	TV Series and Serials: Actress	Won
2014	Peaky Blinders	Crime Thriller Awards	Best Supporting Actress	Nominated
2014	Medea	Evening Standard Theatre Awards	Best Actress	Nominated
2015	Medea	Critics' Circle Theatre Award	Best Actress	Won
2015	Penny Dreadful	Satellite Awards	Best Supporting Actress – Series, Miniseries or Television Film	Nominated
2016	Penny Dreadful	Critics' Choice Television Award	Best Supporting Actress in a Drama Series	Nominated
2016	The Deep Blue Sea	Evening Standard Theatre Awards	Best Actress	Nominated
2016	The Deep Blue Sea	WhatsOnStage Awards	Best Actress in a Play	Nominated

== See also ==
- List of actors in Royal Shakespeare Company productions
- List of British actors
- List of Royal National Theatre Company actors
