= The Further Adventures of Lucky Jim =

British TV sitcom (1982)

- Genre: Comedy
- Based on: Lucky Jim by Kingsley Amis
- Written by: Dick Clement; Ian La Frenais
- Starring: Enn Reitel; Glynis Barber
- Composer: Alan Price
- Country of origin: United Kingdom
- Original language: English
- No. of series: 1
- No. of episodes: 7

Production
- Producer: Harold Snoad
- Running time: 30 minutes
- Production company: BBC

Original release
- Network: BBC Two
- Release: 1 November – 13 December 1982

The Further Adventures of Lucky Jim (a.k.a. The New Adventures of Lucky Jim) is a British television sitcom that first aired on BBC 2 in 1982. It is inspired by the 1954 novel Lucky Jim by Kingsley Amis, updated to the Swinging Sixties. It was intended as a sequel to the 1967 series Further Adventures of Lucky Jim also written by Dick Clement and Ian La Frenais, which had starred Keith Barron in the title role.

Actors who appeared in individual episodes include Miranda Richardson, Clive Swift, Antony Sher, Tony Haygarth, Albert Moses, Trevor Bannister, Tim Barrett, Timothy Carlton, Geoffrey Chater and Wanda Ventham.

== Synopsis ==
In 1967 returning from a year abroad, university lecturer Jim Dixon is determined to get into the spirit of the times.

== Main cast ==
- Enn Reitel as Jim Dixon
- Glynis Barber as Lucy Simmons
- David Simeon as Philip Lassiter
- Barbara Flynn as Joanna Lassiter
- Nick Stringer as George Bowles
- Debbie Wheeler as Susan
- Peter Hughes as Mr. Dixon
- Margery Mason as Mrs. Dixon
- Jane Myerson as Penny Davenport

== Episodes ==
No.	Title	Directed and produced by	Written by	Original release date
1	"The Big Smoke"	Harold Snoad	Dick Clement and Ian La Frenais	1 November 1982
2	"A Foot in the Door"	Harold Snoad	Dick Clement and Ian La Frenais	8 November 1982
3	"Scoop"	Harold Snoad	Dick Clement and Ian La Frenais	15 November 1982
4	"The Apartment"	Harold Snoad	Dick Clement and Ian La Frenais	22 November 1982
5	"Eckersley Revisited"	Harold Snoad	Dick Clement and Ian La Frenais	29 November 1982
6	"The Ties That Bind"	Harold Snoad	Dick Clement and Ian La Frenais	6 December 1982
7	"Will Success Spoil Jim Dixon?"	Harold Snoad	Dick Clement and Ian La Frenais	13 December 1982

== Bibliography ==
- Horace Newcomb. Encyclopedia of Television. Routledge, 2014.
