= Grafters =

- Genre: Comedy drama
- Created by: Michael Chaplin
- Starring: Robson Green; Stephen Tompkinson; Darren Morfitt; Emily Joyce; Marian McLoughlin; Will Parker; Neil Stuke; Carli Norris; Stephen Boxer; Lesley Vickerage; David Westhead; Katherine Wogan; Berwick Kaler
- Theme music composer: Robert Lockhart
- Composers: Robert Lockhart (Series 1); Ray Russell (Series 2)
- Country of origin: United Kingdom
- Original language: English
- No. of series: 2
- No. of episodes: 16

Production
- Executive producers: Simon Lewis; Susan Hogg; Sandra Jobling
- Producer: Helen Gregory
- Production locations: London, England, UK (Series 1); Brighton, East Sussex, England, UK (Series 2)
- Production company: Granada Television

Original release
- Network: ITV
- Release: 27 October 1998 – 20 December 1999

Grafters is a British comedy drama programme originally broadcast in the UK on ITV from 27 October 1998 to 20 December 1999 for 16 episodes over two series.

Grafters relates the lives of the Purvis brothers Joe (Robson Green) and Trevor (Stephen Tompkinson), who along with their younger cousin Simon (Darren Morfitt) run a successful building business.

The show regularly received ratings of over 9 million viewers and at the time was among ITV's most popular drama series. It received a 7.6/10 rating on IMDB.

== Cast ==
- Paul Carter – Dulwich Hill
- Robson Green – Joe Purvis
- Stephen Tompkinson – Trevor Purvis
- Darren Morfitt – Simon Purvis
- Emily Joyce – Laura
- Neil Stuke – Paul
- Carli Norris – Melanie
- Marian McLoughlin – Pippa
- Eva Pope – Janice
- Luisa Bradshaw-White – Debbie
- David Westhead – Nick Costello
- Katherine Wogan – Clare Costello
- Lesley Vickerage – Viv Casey
- Patrick Baladi – Will
- Maurice Roëves – Lennie
- James Gaddas – Ray
- Berwick Kaler – Uncle Alan
- Lisa Kay – Chloe
- Judy Goldberg – Auctioneer's Assistant

== DVD releases ==
Entertainment One has released the complete series on DVD in Region 1 for the very first time. Season 1 was released on 17 July 2007, while season 2 was released on 4 December 2007.

Shock Entertainment released the complete series on DVD in Australia on 12 January 2009. Series 1 & 2 will be released on Region 2 on 26 February 2018.
