= List of advertising awards =

List about advertising awards

This list of advertising awards is an index to articles about notable awards given to the advertising industry. The list is organized by the home country of the sponsor, although most awards are not limited to one country. The list is restricted to the advertising industry, as opposed to trade organizations, film and music festivals, and so on where the awards may be considered to have some advertising value.

Country	Award	Sponsor	Notes
Africa	Pitcher Awards	Pitcher Festival of Creativity	Pitcher Awards is the Pan-African benchmark for creative excellence. Awards are given annually in various areas of Print, Film, Outdoor, Radio Advertising, Media, PR, Entertainment, Digital and Sustainability Communications initiates.
Australia	YoungGuns International Award	YoungGuns Award	Best young commercial practitioners and students across the fields of advertising, communication design, digital creative, advertising media and public relations
Belarus	White Square Awards	Belarus Advertising Coalition	One of the most important Eastern European advertising festivals
Europe	Cristal Festival Awards	Cristal Festival Europe	Prizes are awarded to advertising agencies, producers and advertisers
Europe	Eventex Awards	Eventex	Eventex Awards is the global benchmark for excellence in events and experiential marketing
Europe	Art Directors Club of Europe Awards	Art Directors Club of Europe	The best of the best, the ADCE Awards set the highest benchmark of creative excellence in Europe
France	Cannes Lions Awards	Cannes Lions International Festival of Creativity	
France	Epica Awards	Epica	The only global creative award judged by members of the press. Rewards outstanding creativity
France	Lion of St. Mark (award)	Cannes Lions International Festival of Creativity	Lifetime of services to creativity in communications
India	MADDYS (award)	Advertising Club Madras	An oldest advertising club in India and have been running advertising awards for 40 plus years for both creative and media
Ireland	Shark Awards	Kinsale Shark Awards	
Japan	Galaxy Award (Japan)	Japan Council for Better Radio and Television	Production award for television, radio and commercials
New Zealand	AXIS Awards	Commercial Communications Council	To celebrate and inspire the best creative advertising in Aotearoa New Zealand.
New Zealand	Beacon Awards	Commercial Communications Council	Celebrating outstanding media thinking in Aotearoa New Zealand.
New Zealand	Effie Awards	Commercial Communications Council	Awarding ideas that work in Aotearoa New Zealand.
New Zealand	Pressie Awards	Commercial Communications Council	Celebrating the best PR, Experiential and Social campaigns in Aotearoa New Zealand.
Portugal	Lisbon International Advertising Festival Group	Lisbon Awards Group	A global advertising award recognized for its prestigious jury members and for gathering in Lisbon some of the biggest names of the advertising and creativity's world. It is composed by the Lisbon International Advertising Festival and two others focused on PR and Health. https://www.lisbonawardsgroup.com/awards
South Africa	The Loeries	Loerie Awards Company	Awards for the brand communications industry, in Africa and the Middle East
Ukraine	Kyiv International Advertising Festival	All-Ukrainian Advertising Coalition	Annual Ukrainian international festival
United Kingdom	Cresta International Advertising Awards	Creative Standards International	Creative excellence in international advertising, digital design and marketing communications
United Kingdom	The Annual	Creativepool	Global award for all creative disciplines, includes People's Choice and awards for both companies and individuals
United Kingdom	British Television Advertising Awards	British Arrows	
United Kingdom	European Video Awards	VideoWeek	celebrate the outstanding creativity and innovation within the video & CTV advertising industry, the awards are open to agencies, publishers, adtech and brands across Europe
United Kingdom	London International Awards	London International Awards	Creativity, innovative ideas and new technology in advertising, digital media, production, design, package design, music & sound and branded entertainment
United Kingdom	Creative Circle Awards	Creative Circle	Person or organisation that has had the greatest impact on advertising / Single best advertising creative idea
United Kingdom	D&AD Pencils	Design and Art Direction	To promote excellence in design
United Kingdom	Eurobest European Advertising Festival	Ascential	Celebrates and rewards creative excellence in creative communications, advertising and related fields in Europe
United Kingdom	shots Awards	Advertising publication	3 focused awards covering EMEA, The Americas and Asia Pacific, these awards celebrate the most inspirational creative work, as well as showcasing some of the most successful companies and people in the industry.
United States	Graphis International Advertising Awards	Graphis Inc.	Honors creative excellence in advertising around the globe in print, digital, and video
United States	International ANDY Awards	The Advertising Club of New York	Recognize creative excellence in advertising and to raise the standards of craftsmanship in industry
United States	The One Club	Excellence in advertising	
United States	REGGIE Awards	Association of National Advertisers	Innovative, impactful, and groundbreaking brand activation campaigns
United States	Shorty Awards	Shorty Awards	The best of social media - from creators to brands
United States	American Advertising Awards	American Advertising Federation	
United States	American Advertising Federation Hall of Fame	American Advertising Federation	
United States	Caddy Awards	Detroit Creative Directors Council	Notable advertising created in the Detroit area
United States	Clio Awards	Evolution Media	Innovation and creative excellence in advertising, design and communication
United States	DMACS Awards	Digital Media Advertising Creative Showcase	Creative talent in digital and rich media marketing for the entertainment industry
United States	Golden Trailer Awards	Golden Trailer Awards	Excellence in motion picture marketing, film trailers, posters and television advertisement
United States	Graphis Advertising Awards	Graphis	International juried awards promoting excellence in advertising and design. Award-wiinners are shown online and in the Awards Annual.
United States	National Student Advertising Competition	American Advertising Federation	Student's strategic advertising/marketing/media campaign for a corporate client
United States	OAAA OBIE Awards	Out of Home Advertising Association of America	Creativity in the out-of-home advertising industry
United States	Promax Awards	Promax International/BPME	Honor promotion, design and marketing
United States	Summit Awards	Summit International Awards	Excellence in the communications and marketing industry
United States	Digiday Awards	Digiday Awards	Recognition of companies, campaigns and creative modernizing media and marketing.
United States	DailyCommercials Awards	Advertising publication	Honor the most outstanding and innovative video advertising industry work, focusing on creativity, impact, and storytelling. These awards celebrate the best in video commercial advertising, recognizing the achievements of brands, agencies, and creative professionals.
United States	Jay Chiat Awards	4A's (American Association of Advertising Agencies)	Recognizes the best strategy in marketing, media, and advertising around the world

== See also ==
- List of business and industry awards
- Lists of awards
