= Pulse Africa =

Digital media company in sub-Saharan Africa

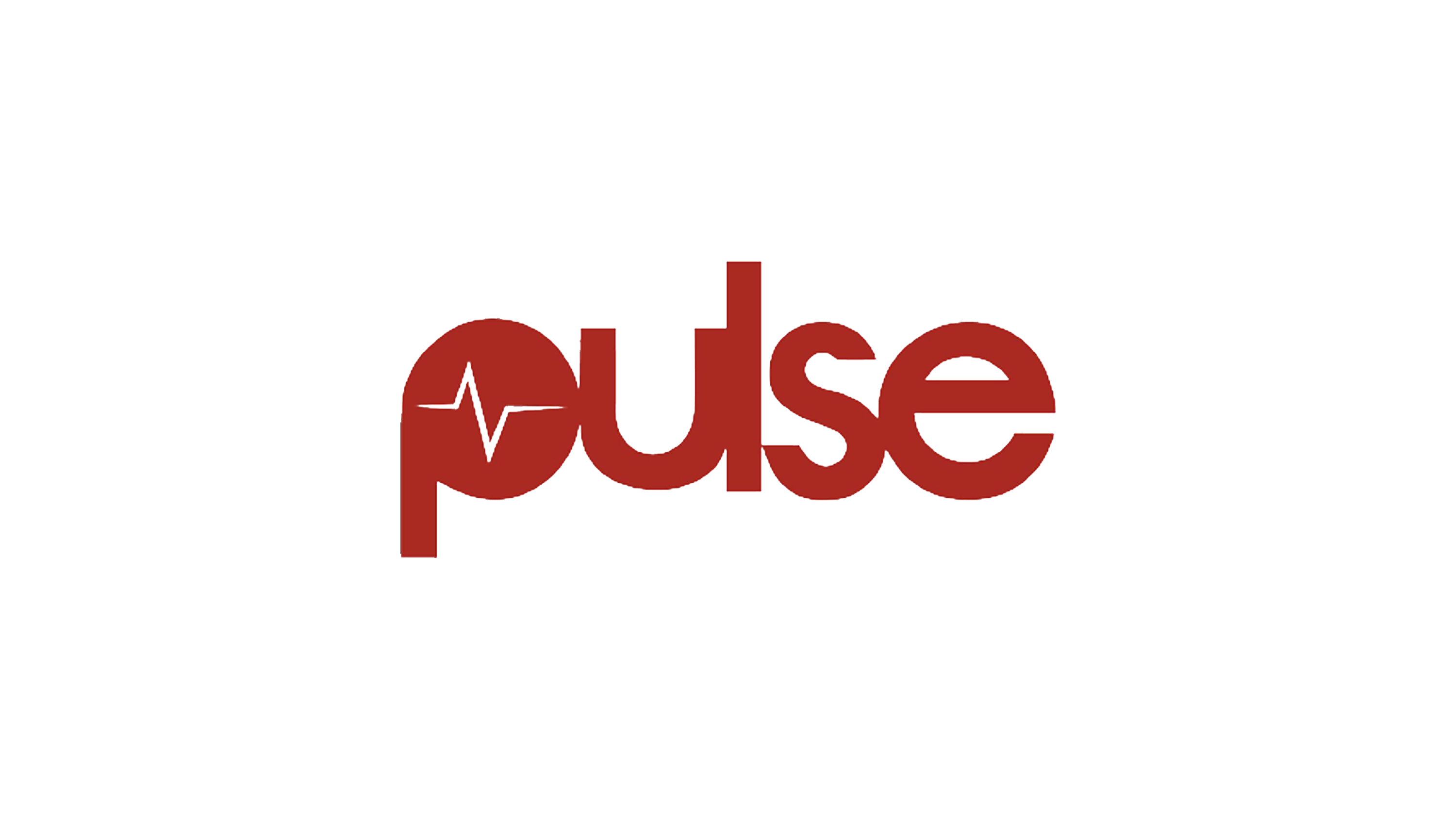
- Formerly: Ringier Africa Digital Publishing (RADP)
- Type: Private
- Industry: Digital Publishing
- Founded: 2012; 14 years ago
- Founder: Ringier AG
- Headquarters: Lagos, Nigeria
- Area served: Nigeria; Ghana; Kenya; Uganda; Senegal; Côte d'Ivoire
- Key people: Katharina Link (CEO); Tim Kollman (Board chairman); Fiona Weeks (Managing director, West Africa); Jack Owigar (Regional director, East Africa); Caroline Mbodj (Managing director, Senegal & Côte d'Ivoire)
- Services: News publishing; Digital marketing; Video production
- Parent: Ringier AG
- Website: pulse.africa

Pulse Africa is a digital media company in sub-Saharan Africa owned by Ringier. The company publishes Pulse Nigeria, Pulse Ghana, Pulse Kenya, Pulse Uganda, Pulse Senegal, Pulse Côte d'Ivoire, Pulse Sports, and other associated media properties. Pulse was founded in 2012^{[3]} and owns the licence to publish Business Insider in Africa.

Pulse reaches over 100 million people monthly and has been named 'best in audience engagement' by the World Association of News Publishers and other global media awards.

== History ==
=== Early growth ===
Pulse began as Ringier Africa Digital Publishing (RADP) as part of Ringier AG's investment in the African media space.

In 2012, RADP launched Pulse Nigeria (Pulse.ng) in Nigeria as a mobile-first platform that publishes news, entertainment, and social media content. As of 2015, Pulse Nigeria's website, pulse.ng had become one of the most visited news websites in the country and gained a reputation for its youthful entertainment content. In 2014, Pulse Nigeria partnered with Meta to launch the ‘Creators of Tomorrow’ initiative, a campaign that spotlights young and upcoming Nigerian creators.

In 2014, Pulse Ghana (Pulse.com.gh) was launched in Ghana and adapted the Nigerian format to suit local interests.

In 2017, Pulse Kenya (pulselive.co.ke) was launched in Nairobi as Pulse's entry into the East African Anglophone market.

In 2020, Pulse expanded into Francophone West Africa by launching Pulse.sn for Senegal. Although Pulse had maintained an office in Dakar for digital marketing services since 2017, its media arm only went live in 2020. Pulse Senegal offered news and entertainment in French, covering content relevant to Senegalese and French-speaking audiences.

In 2020, Pulse was among 20 media organisations selected from 13 countries to receive the 2020 Google News Initiative (GNI) Innovation Fund

In 2021, Pulse expanded its Francophone operations with the launch of Pulse Côte d'Ivoire (pulse.ci). The company initially worked remotely to increase its French-language output before opening a physical office in Abidjan later that year. Caroline Mbodj was appointed managing director for Francophone Africa to oversee both the Senegal and Côte d'Ivoire operations.

In January 2022, Pulse Uganda (pulse.ug) went live with its office in Kampala, becoming Pulse's fifth core market and its second in East Africa to target the country's large youth demographic.

=== Asset consolidation ===
In February 2020, Ringier Africa Digital Publishing unified all its media assets under the Pulse brand and renamed RADP to Pulse Africa. Under this structure, each country news website - Pulse.ng (Nigeria), Pulse.com.gh (Ghana), Pulselive.co.ke (Kenya) - continued with their existing names. The company's ancillary units were also rebranded: Ringier's digital video arm became Pulse TV, the digital agency Ringier Digital Marketing (RDM) became Pulse Marketing, and the creative studio became Pulse Studio.

=== Pulse Influencer Awards ===
In 2021, Pulse Africa launched the Pulse Influencer Awards to recognize social media influencers and content creators across various African countries who drive social engagement through platforms such as Instagram, TikTok, Twitter, and YouTube. The awards were first held in Nigeria, Ghana, Kenya, and Senegal, and later extended to include Uganda and Côte d'Ivoire.

Winners included public figures from media, entertainment, and lifestyle sectors, with each country hosting its own nomination, voting, and awards process.

== Partnerships ==
In 2018, RADP signed a licensing agreement with The New York Times (NYT) to syndicate NYT content on Pulse platforms in Nigeria, Ghana and Kenya to give Pulse readers access to international news and analysis from The New York Times.

Pulse also integrated wire service content like Agence France-Presse and live sports data via Sportradar to enrich its offerings.

In 2016, RADP acquired the right to publish digital editions of Men’s Health and Women’s Health in West Africa. The fitness and lifestyle brands were introduced via Pulse platforms in Nigeria and Ghana, marking the magazines’ first entry into Africa outside South Africa. The magazine no longer featured on Pulse as of 2023.

Around the same time in 2016, Ringier announced a deal with Business Insider to bring the business news outlet's content to Pulse audiences. By January 2017, dedicated “BI” sections were running on Pulse sites in Nigeria, Ghana, and Kenya, featuring local business journalism alongside Business Insider’s international content.

== Business model ==
=== Publishing and content ===
Pulse operates on a digital-first publishing model, distributing content primarily through online platforms and social media. Its core products are free-to-access news and entertainment websites tailored to each market and owned social media pages. Pulse's content ranges from hard news and politics to entertainment, lifestyle, sports and trending social stories. In a 2020 interview with The Guardian, previous Pulse CEO Leonard Stiegeler noted that the goal of Pulse its to be “a publisher for this mobile and social generation.” The company has won several notable awards for it audience-first approach to youthful storytelling which adopts Ringier International CEO Dimitry Shinskin's user needs model. The approach has been used as case study in global studies on how news media can engage young audiences in Africa.

=== Media vertical and products ===
==== Pulse Media ====
Pulse Media is Pulse Africa's flagship vertical that creates multimedia content that is distributed on its different country websites and social media channels. Pulse TV is the video content division where the company produces short-form video clips, web shows, and original series distributed on Pulse websites and social platforms.

==== Pulse Sports ====
Pulse Sports is a sports media covers sports content relevant to African audiences. The platform was launched as a section within Pulse's country websites and became a standalone platform in 2023, following a joint venture between Ringier AG and Sportradar to integrate real-time sports data, statistics, and analytics into Pulse Sports coverage. This led to Pulse Sports' integration into the Ringier Sports Media Group (RSMG) through Sportal, a subsidiary of RSMG.

Pulse Marketing

Pulse Marketing is the digital marketing arm of the company which provides creative services to businesses. In 2024, Pulse Marketing ran the “Selarah” social experiment. The campaign created a fictitious beauty brand with deliberately provocative messaging that implied women need male approval for makeup. The messaging sparked backlash on social media for its regressive tone. Pulse was criticised for even momentarily promoting such a message for clout. Pulse responded saying that the campaign was an intentional social experiment to demonstrate the perils of off-key marketing that ignores sound strategy for virality without respecting for the audience's values.

Business Insider Africa

Business Insider Africa publishes news articles on finance, entrepreneurship, technology, and global economic trends. The platform was launched in January 2017 as Business Insider Sub-Saharan Africa under a content licensing partnership between Business Insider (Insider Inc.) and Ringier Africa Digital Publishing (RADP).

In August 2020, Business Insider Africa transitioned to a standalone platform by launching its own website under the same licensing agreement between Pulse and Insider Inc.

== See also ==
- Ringer AG
- Blick
- Business Insider

== Awards and recognitions ==
Year	Award	Category	Recipient	Status
2025	2025 Young Lions Competitions	Film	Jan Rotas & Idarego Matthew (Pulse Nigeria)	Won
2025	WAN-IFRA Digital Media Awards Africa	Best in Audience Engagement	Pulse Africa	Won
2025	WAN-IFRA Digital Media Awards Africa	Best Use of Video	Business Insider Africa	Nominated
2025	WAN-IFRA Digital Media Awards Africa	Best Relaunch of Digital Product	Pulse Sports	
2025	International News Media Awards (INMA) Global Media Awards	Best Use of Social Media	Business Insider Africa for “Leading Social-First Business Journalism in Africa”	Nominated
2024	TikTok Sub-Saharan Africa Awards	Creator of the Year	Chioma Anyanwu (Pulse Nigeria Sr. Social Media Manager)	Won
2024	Pitcher Awards	5× Awards for 'Mekakrawa' Advertising Campaign	Pulse Ghana (Ringier Ghana) & Prudential Life Insurance	Won (5 awards)
2024	Nigerian Sports Journalists in Diaspora (NSJID) Awards	Grassroots Sports Reporting (Online/Social Media)	Hassan Abdulsalam (Pulse Sports Nigeria journalist)	Won
2023	Gage Awards	Online TV of the Year	Pulse Nigeria	Won
2023	TikTok Top Creator Awards	Publisher of the Year	Pulse Nigeria TikTok	Won
2022	WAN-IFRA Digital Media Awards Africa	Best in Audience Engagement	Pulse (Ghana) – Pulse Instagram platform	Won
2021	WAN-IFRA Digital Media Awards Africa	Best in Audience Engagement	Pulse (Nigeria) – for innovative TikTok content strategy	Won
2018	Nigeria Internet Registration Association (.NG) Awards	Best Online Media Website	Pulse Nigeria	Won
2016	Nigerian Writers Awards	Entertainment Writer of the Year	Joey Akan (Pulse Nigeria journalist, Head of Music)	Won
