= Julia Weist =

American artist

- Born: April 3, 1984 (age 40); New York, New York, US
- Education: Cooper Union, Pratt Institute School of Information
- Known for: interdisciplinary art

Julia Weist (born 1984) is an American visual artist. Themes in Weist's work include archival science, knowledge organization, media distribution, algorithmic technology, history and politics. Weist often uses found images and media to create photographs, video, installations, sculptures, artist books and public artworks.

== Early life and education ==
Weist was born in New York City in 1984. Her brother, Nicholas, is a curator. She received her BFA from the Cooper Union in 2007 and a MLIS from Pratt Institute in 2011.

Before becoming a full-time artist, Weist worked as a librarian at the New York Public Library, as well as an information scientist, photo editor, and artist's assistant for Janine Antoni and Spencer Finch.

In 2007, Weist and Maayan Pearl created The Public Library of American Public Library Deaccession, which commented on public library deaccession practices by collecting deaccessioned books to create an online database and a physical installation. As a part of the project, Weist wrote a manuscript of a romance novel, the most commonly withdrawn genre from libraries, and submitted it to publishers in order to collect rejection letters; however, the book was accepted and in 2008, published as Sexy Librarian: Critical Edition of the Original Novel. The piece coincided with Weist's MLIS program, and culminated in a physical display of discarded library books alongside her degrees in 2011.

== Public artworks and response ==
In 2015, Weist's public artwork Reach went viral. The artwork consists of a single word ("parbunkells"), that had never been used on the Internet, installed on a billboard in Forest Hills, Queens. The public response to the project was wide-ranging, with an extensive amount of social media activity related to the billboard. Entrepreneurial attempts to capitalize on the project included the creation of T-shirts and other merchandise on Redbubble and the sale of a domain using the word parbunkells which was listed on eBay for $20,000. From 2013 to 2015, Weist worked on the project After, About, With, manipulating the search results for the artist Haim Steinbach as a way to explore how meaning about artists' work is codified online.

In 2019, Weist was selected for a public artwork commission initiated by the Department of Cultural Affairs in New York City in 2019. As part of that project, she served as an artist-in-residence at the NYC Department of Records and Information Services and created artworks that were classified as government records. In 2022, Weist's second billboard-based project premiered in Times Square, in conjunction with an exhibition at Rachel Uffner Gallery, which featured work inspired by her residency at the Department of Records and Information Services. Through this billboard, Weist advertised her short film, Governing Body with promotional design that Motion Picture Association of America disapproved for public use. The National Coalition Against Censorship issued a statement of support for Weist's Times Square billboard, calling on the Motion Picture Association to update its standards.

== Exhibitions ==
Weist's work has been presented in museum exhibitions including Limits of Control at the Museum of Modern Art, NY in 2023, Open Call at The Shed (arts center) in 2019, 17.(SEPT) [By WeistSiréPC]™ at the Queens Museum, NY in 2017, Art In The Age Of…Planetary Computation at Kunstinstituut Melly, Rotterdam in 2015 and The Book Lovers at the Museum of Contemporary Art, Antwerp in 2013 among several others. Weist participated in the 12th Gwangju Biennale. Her most recent solo exhibition was with Rachel Uffner Gallery in 2022.

== Recognition ==
In 2015, Weist was given a national advertising award from the Out of Home Advertising Association of America for her public artwork Reach. She received the Net-based Audience Prize from Haus der Elektronischen Künste (Basel, Switzerland) in 2016.

== Personal life ==
Weist lives in Brooklyn, New York and has a studio in Catskill, New York. She is married to artist Andrés Laracuente.

== Notable works in public collections ==
- Definitions (2020), Metropolitan Museum of Art, New York
- Demonstration (2020), Museum of Modern Art, New York
- From the Future (2020), Art Institute of Chicago
- Giuliani (2020), Brooklyn Museum
- International (2020), Pennsylvania Academy of the Fine Arts
- Rubrics (2020), MIT List Visual Arts Center
- Should(n't) (2020), The Guggenheim
