= Bashka Paeff =

Russian-born American artist (1889–1979)

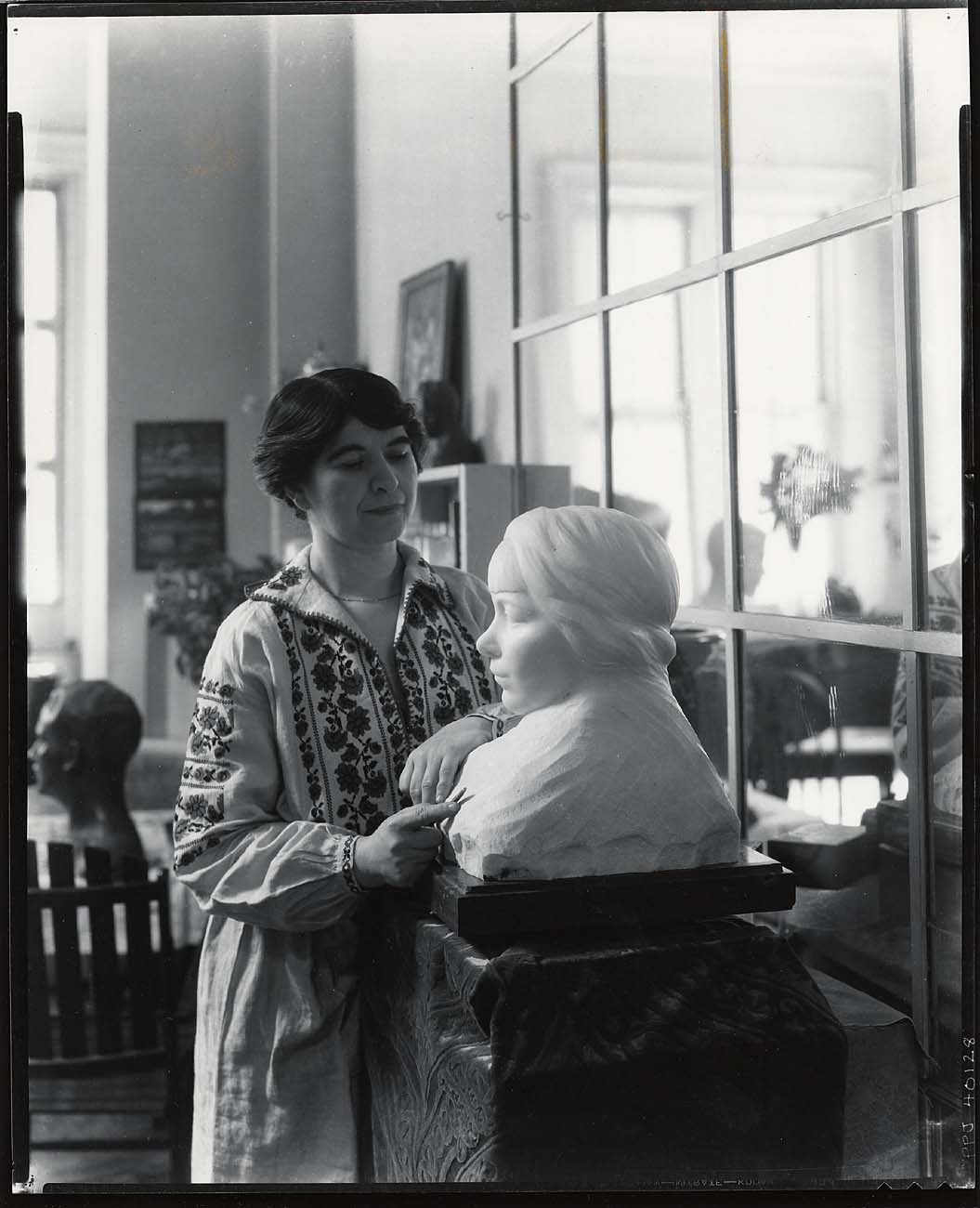
- Born: Belarusian: Башка Паэф; August 12, 1889; Minsk, Russian Empire
- Died: January 24, 1979 (aged 89)
- Education: Massachusetts Normal Art School, School of the Museum of Fine Arts, Boston
- Spouse: Samuel Montefiore Waxman

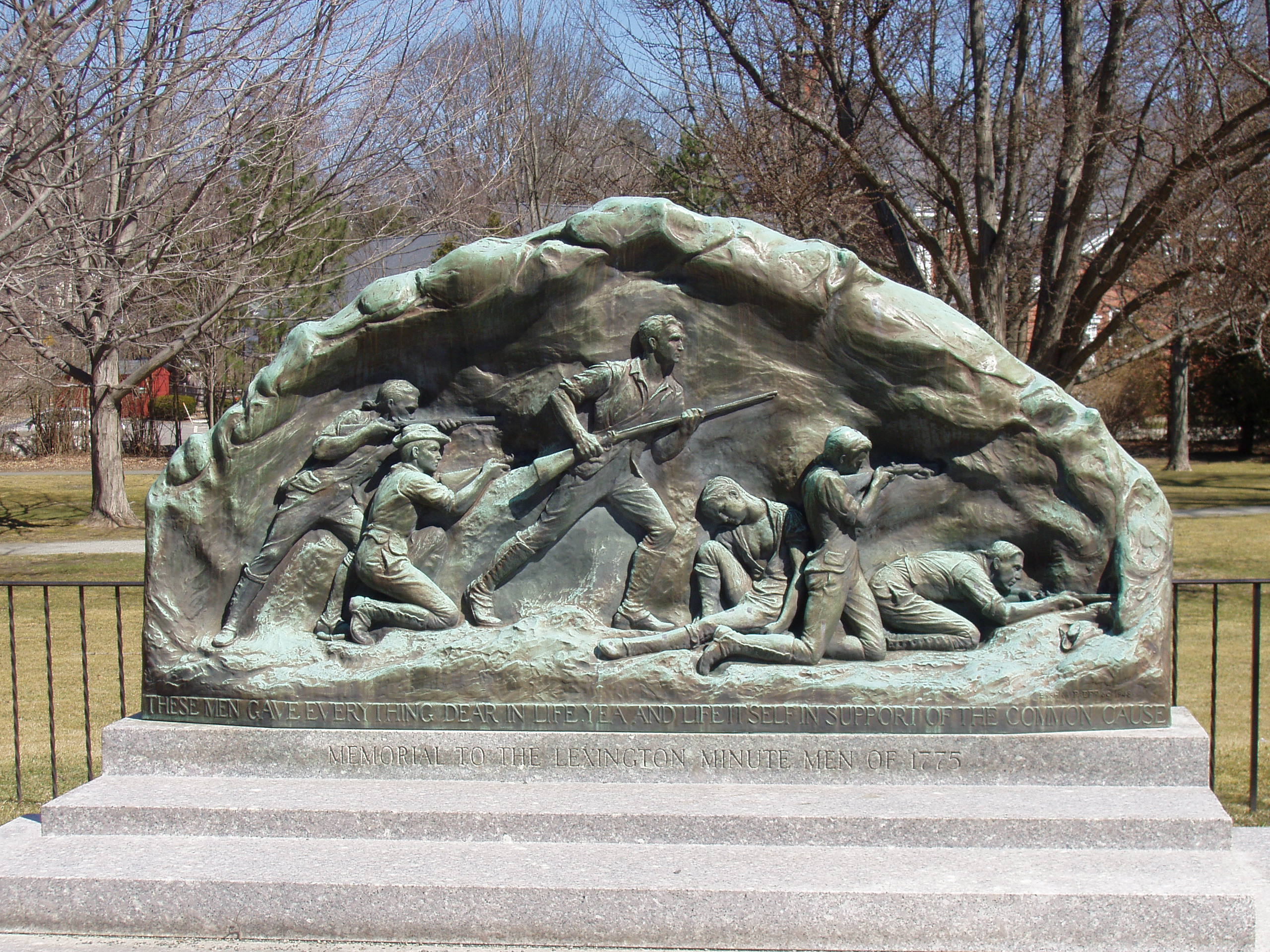
Lexington Militia Man relief by Bashka Paeff

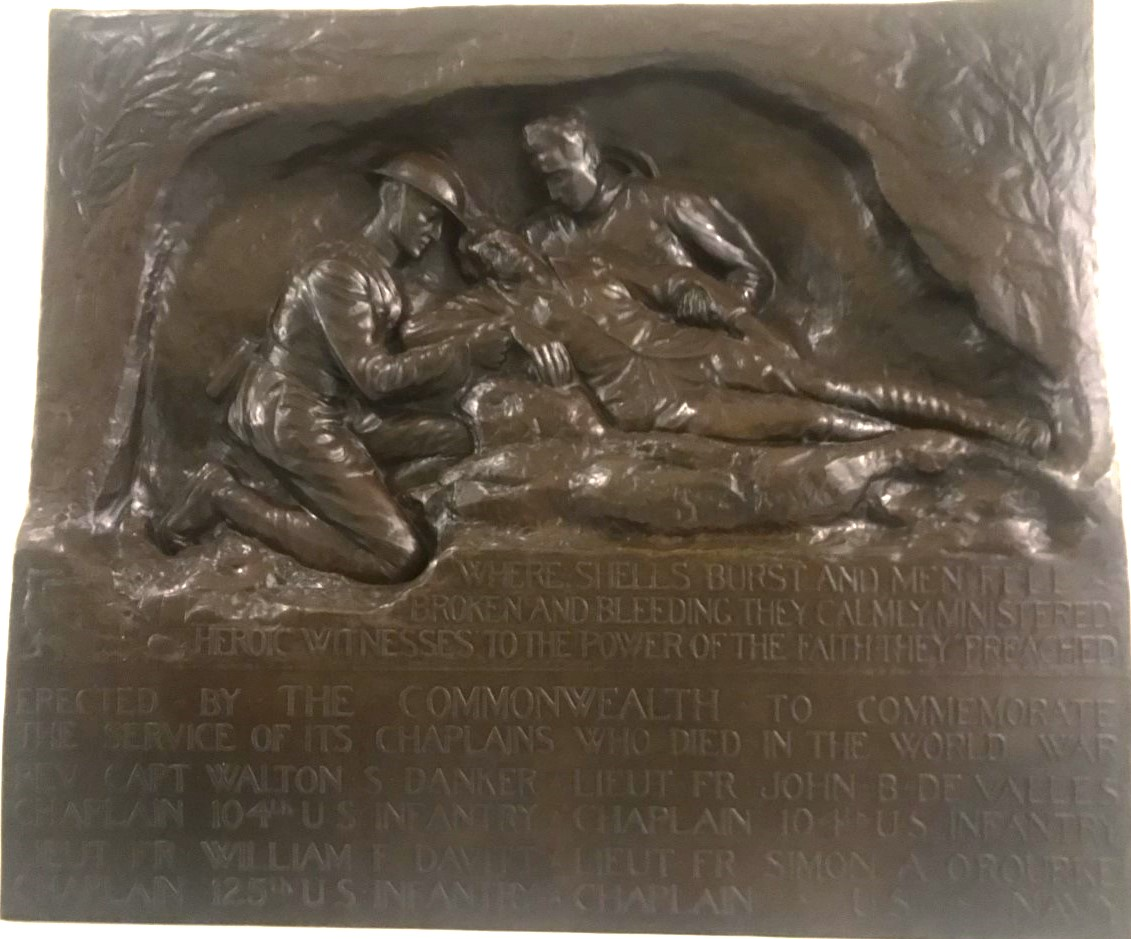
Chaplain's Memorial 1922 high relief by Bashka Paeff

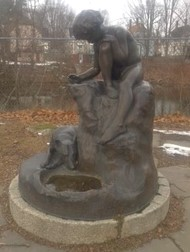
Bashka Paeff created this commissioned sculpture for Cornelia Warren to honor John Warren owner of the Cumberland Paper Mills in Westbrook, Maine.

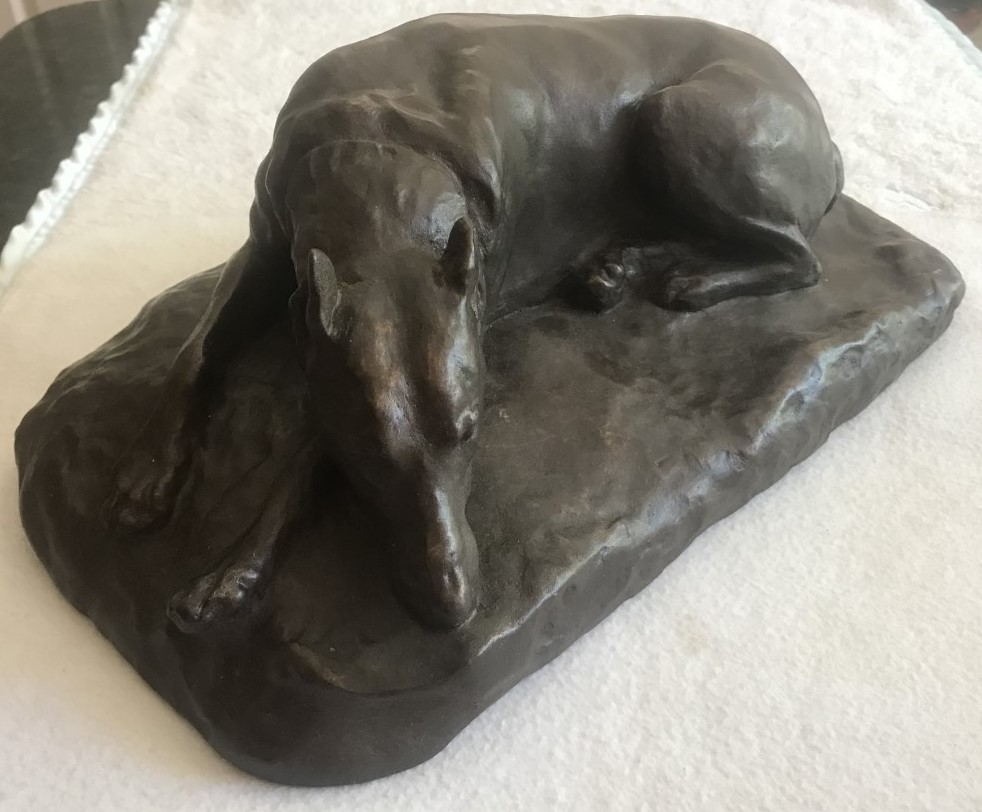
Sculpture of Sleeping Dog by Bashka Paeff – Collection of the Cyrus Dallin Art Museum

Bashka Paeff (Belarusian: Башка Паэф) (August 12, 1889 – January 24, 1979), was an American sculptor active near Boston, Massachusetts.

Paeff was known as the Subway sculptor for the pieces she modeled at the Park Street T station while working her way through art school at the Boston Museum School. She was especially known for realistic animal sculptures, war memorials, fountains and portraits which she created in the classical tradition.

== Biography ==
Paeff was born into a Jewish family in Minsk, Russian Empire in 1889. When she was a year old, her family immigrated to the United States. At the age of 13 or 14 she enrolled in Massachusetts College of Art and Design (then called Massachusetts Normal Art School) in Boston. In addition to completing programs in drawing, painting, and art education, she studied sculpture with Cyrus Edwin Dallin and graduated in 1911. In 1914 she attended the School of the Museum of Fine Arts, Boston, where she studied with Bela Pratt, and was sometimes called the "Subway sculptor" because she worked at Boston's Park Street T station. She worked at the MacDowell Colony in Peterborough, New Hampshire on seven occasions from 1916 through 1937 and executed a sculpture of Mrs. Edward MacDowell seated in a chair. Paeff married Samuel Montefiore Waxman, Professor of Romance Languages at Boston University.

Paeff was a member of the Guild of Boston Artists, the Detroit Society of Arts and Crafts, Boston Society of Architects and the Society of Arts and Crafts, Boston. She frequently exhibited at the Guild including the sculpture of Jane Addams in the organization's Spring 1915 general exhibition. One of her early prominent sculptures was the Children of Youth podium for Brucemore, the Cedar Rapids, Iowa estate home of breakfast cereal magnate George Bruce Douglas. In 1918 she executed a bas-relief of Oliver Wendell Holmes. The Boston Museum of Fine Arts included her sculpture of the "Whippet Dog" in a 1920 exhibit of local artists in its Renaissance Court that also included works by William Paxton and John Singer Sargent. In 1918 her studio address was Boston's Arlington Street, a 1920 article mentions River Street and in 1923, her listed address was on Pinckney Street, Boston, Massachusetts.

In 1920 Paeff executed a fountain group sculpture “Mother and Child" for Sears Roebuck executive Julius Rosenwald’s Summer home in Ravinia, Illinois. The bronze sculpture was placed in the estate's main house sun parlor. Mrs. Rosenwald was an ardent supporter of the arts.

Today Paeff is perhaps best known for the Maine Sailors and Soldiers Memorial on Route 1 crossing from Portsmouth, New Hampshire into Kittery, Maine. Its creation was marred by some political controversy. She received her commission in 1924 from Governor Percival P. Baxter, but in 1925 his successor, Governor Ralph Brewster, rejected the piece as overly pacifist. Minor changes accommodated both men, and the revised sculpture was installed in 1926 in what is now called John Paul Jones Memorial Park. Another notable sculpture of a boy and his dog is located in Westbrook Maine. A friend of Paeff, Cornelia Warren commissioned the Warren Memorial Fountain to honor her father John E. Warren and it featured a crouched boy on a rock with a resting Belgian Police Hound at its base. The boy is directing a flow of water into a pool for the dog to drink. The boy was modeled after John Warren's grandson, Mortimer Warren Jr. The dog was modeled after a pet of Boston attorney, Sherman Whipple. This sculpture was part of her 1919 show at the Guild of Boston Artists. The sculpture still stands on the shore of the Presumpscot River near the Warren Paper Mill.

In 1938, her relief sculpture of James Geddes was installed at the Boston University Library after he donated 5000 books and a Geddes Memorial Room was named after him. Professor Geddes had been teaching languages at the school for fifty years. The sculpture was funded by Geddes' friends and students. In 1942, the National League of American Pen Women commissioned her to sculpt a bust of the famous composer Amy Beach for her 75th birthday, and that piece was donated to Washington's Phillips Collection.

Other notable pieces by Paeff include a fountain sculpture of a small boy with bird at the Boston Public Garden (Arlington Street entrance), a statue of Warren G. Harding's pet Airedale "Laddie Boy" cast from 19,000 US penny coins at the Smithsonian Institution, a bas relief of Ellen Swallow Richards at the Massachusetts Institute of Technology, and a relief depicting the Battle of Lexington near Buckman Tavern in Lexington, Massachusetts. Boy and Bird is featured on the Boston Women's Heritage Trail. Her high relief bronze, the "Chaplains' Memorial" honoring World War I veterans is prominently installed in the Massachusetts State House outside the House Meeting Room.

In 1956 the William Rosenwald Family Fund commissioned her to execute a Carrara marble sculpture of U. S. Supreme Court Justice Louis D. Brandeis for Brandeis University in memory of William's father, Julius Rosenwald. The 1000-pound sculpture was unveiled in February 1957. The slightly larger than life sculpture depicted Brandeis from the waist up and was to be placed initially on a three-foot pedestal in the Hayden Science Building.

In 1969, Paeff's bronze relief of Martin Luther King was unveiled at Boston University by Coretta Scott King when she was on campus to give a convocation address.

== Gallery ==
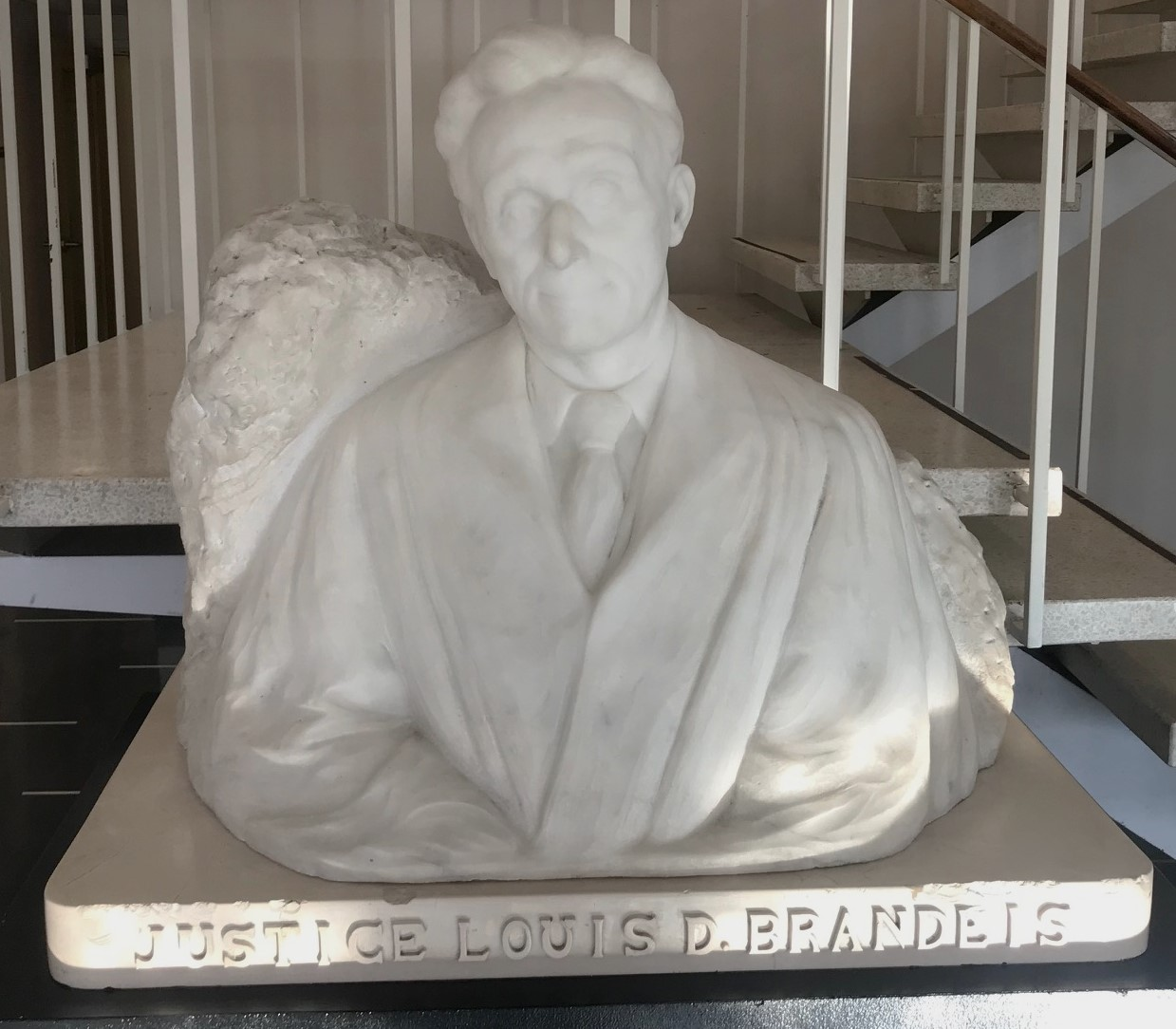
Supreme Court Justice Louis Brandeis by Bashka Paeff at Brandeis University, Waltham, Massachusetts

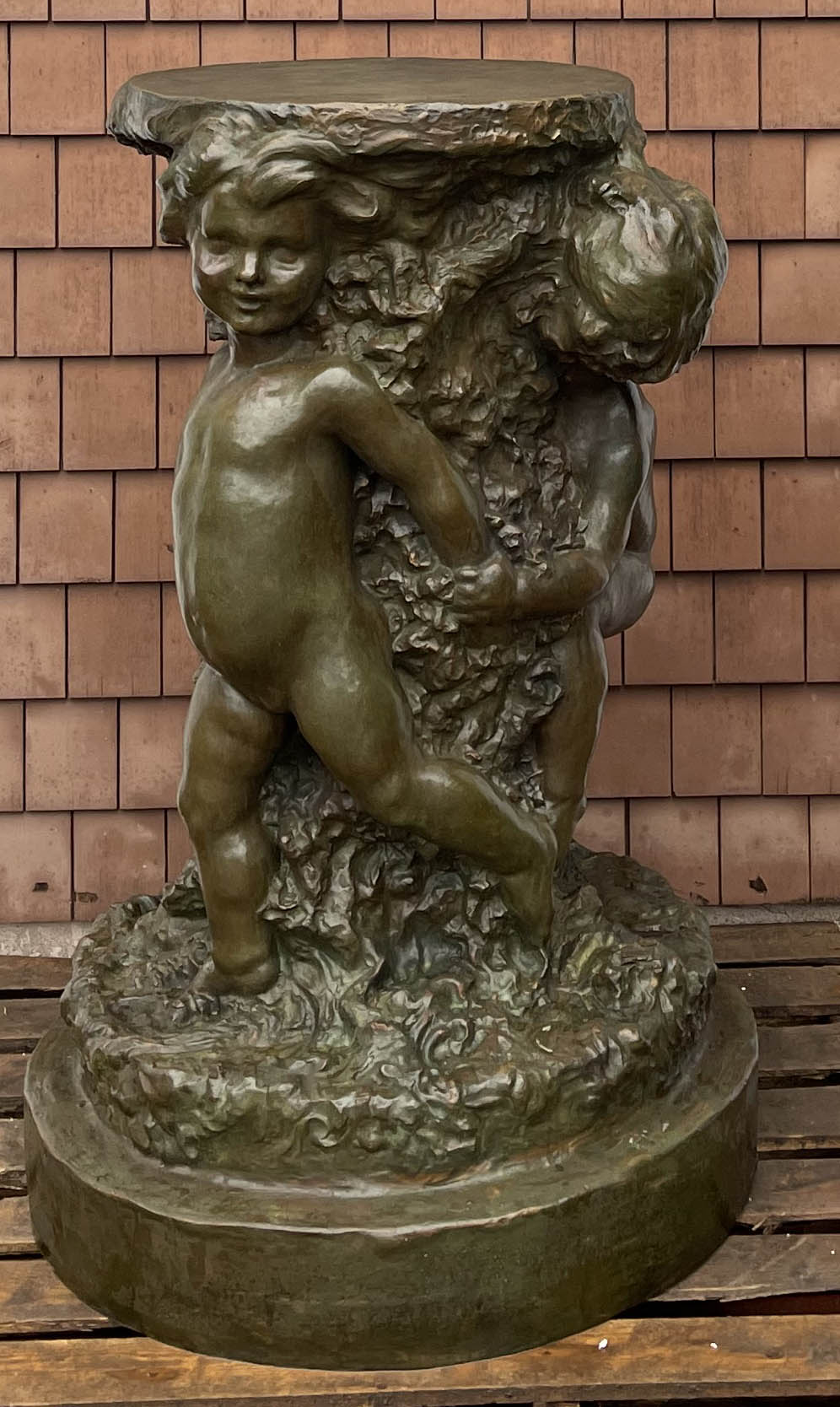
Sundial podium created by sculptor Bashka Paeff for Irene H. Douglas, Brucemore, Cedar Rapids, Iowa, 1915

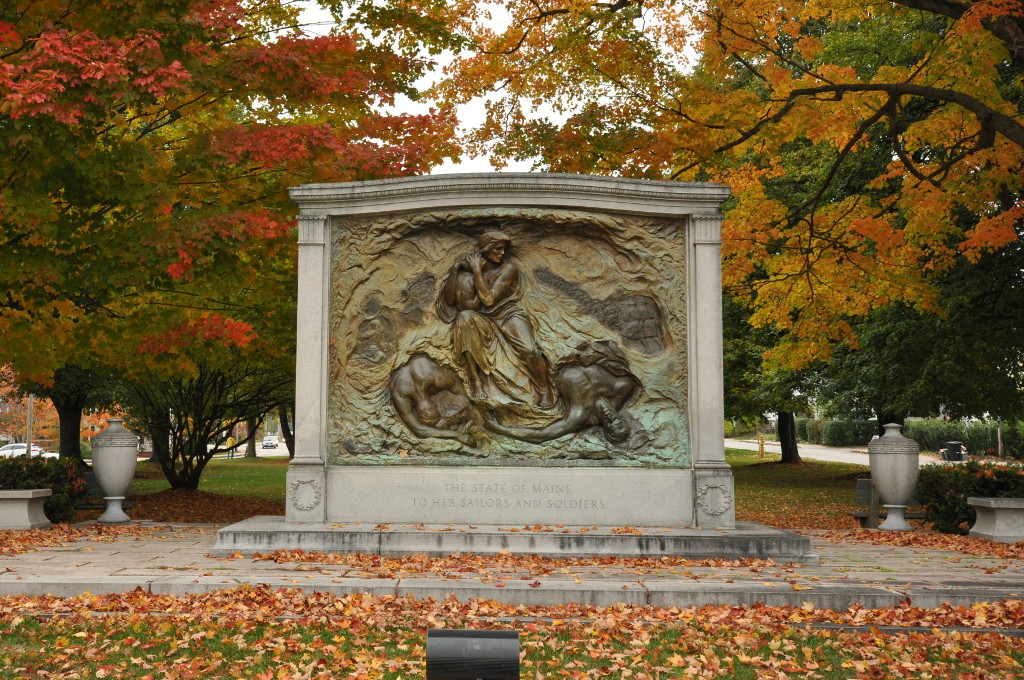
World War I Memorial, Jones Park, Kittery, Maine

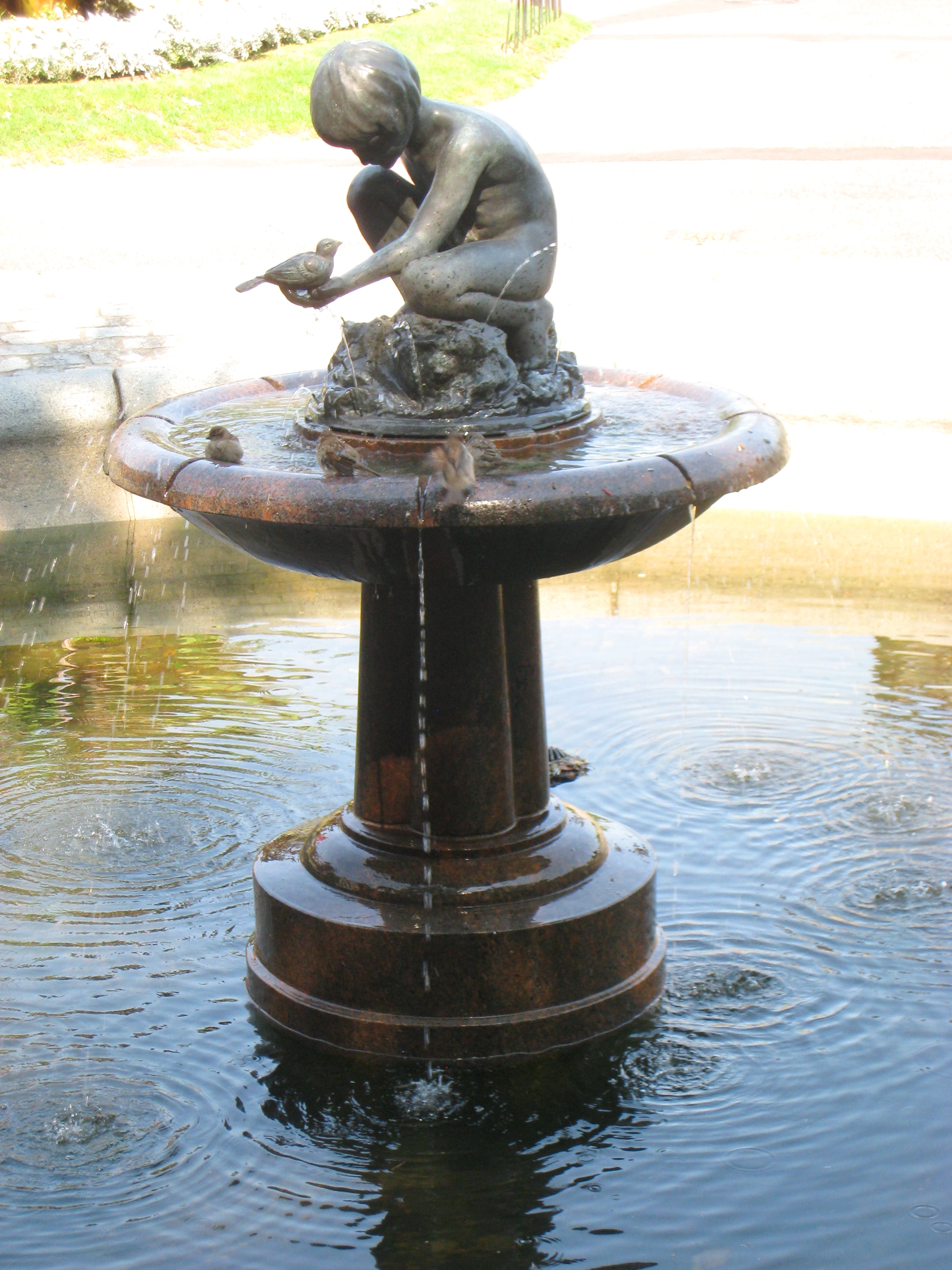
Boy and Bird Fountain (1934), Boston Public Garden, Boston, Massachusetts

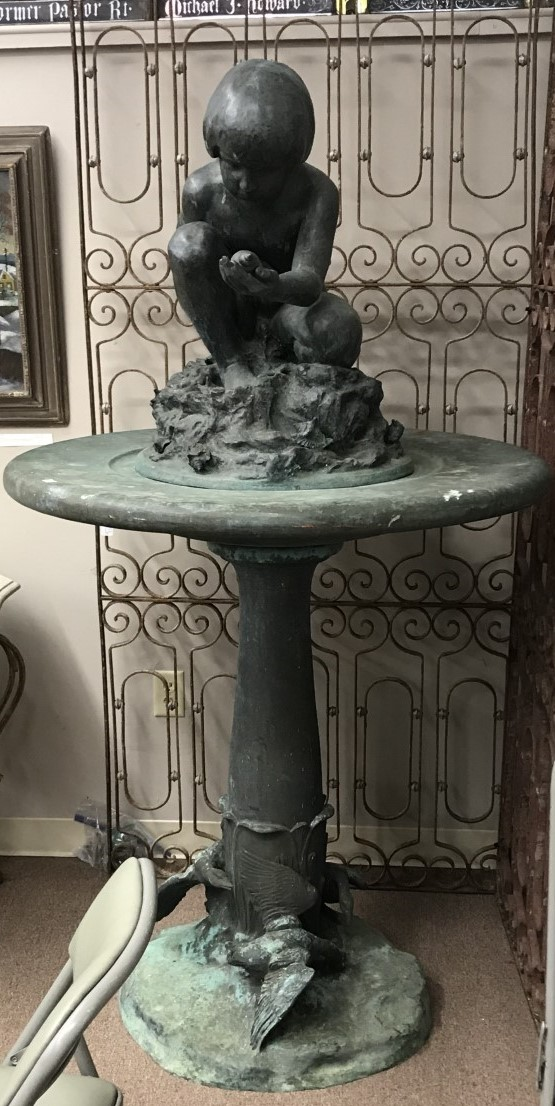
Bashka Paeff sculpted this bronze sculpture and pedestal.
