= B. K. Taylor =

American cartoonist

- Born: Robert K. Taylor
- Areas: Cartoonist, Illustrator, Writer
- Notable works: Odd Rods collector stickers, Sick magazine, National Lampoon, Home Improvement
- Awards: Inkpot Award (1980), Gold Brick Award, Caddy Awards (7), Funny Bone Award, ACE Award (1990), Reed Award (2010)

B. K. (Bob) Taylor is an American illustrator, cartoonist, writer, production designer, costume designer, puppeteer, and musician known for his work on the Odd Rods collector stickers of the late 1960s, his covers for Sick magazine, his comics in National Lampoon, and for his work as a staff writer on ABC'S popular sitcom, Home Improvement. He lives in Metro Detroit and continues to work as an illustrator and writer, performing occasionally in a local rock band.

== Education ==
B. K. Taylor studied art at Detroit's premier art school, the Art School of the Detroit Society of Arts and Crafts (later known as Center for Creative Studies, now College for Creative Studies), under advertising department chair and instructor Harry Borgman.

== Career ==
Taylor began his varied career while still in art school in Detroit, illustrating covers for Sick magazine. Since then, he has been using his creative ideas to create book, magazine, and trading card illustrations, muppet designs for Jim Henson and others, and has worked on writing teams for television and feature releases including Home Improvement with Tim Allen, and Disney's Mulan.

=== Sick and Mad magazines ===
At least as early as 1966, Taylor was doing cover illustrations for Sick, while still studying at the Art School of the Detroit Society of Arts and Crafts.

He illustrated a piece in Mad issue #357 (1997), titled "The Mad World of Religion," written by Rick Rodgers.

=== Odd Rods and other stickers ===
In 1969, Taylor created 44 stickers for the Donruss Company's group of non-sports trading card/sticker series, Odd Rods. The series was very popular with schoolchildren of the time, resulting in a string of sequel series.

In 1988, Taylor created more collectable stickers for Leaf/Donruss, "Awesome All*Stars," a spoof of baseball cards featuring humorously grotesque monsters. There were 99 cards in the series.

In 1989, for Leaf/Donruss, Taylor created Baseball's Greatest Gross Outs, featuring more cartoon parodies of baseball players with names like "Long-arm Lenny" and "Garlic-breath Gary." The set featured 88 stickers as well as a repeat of some of those stickers with a 36-cardback poster.

In 1983 he did another set of collector sticker cards called Zero Heroes, featuring tragically flawed superheroes with names like "The Fantastic Fast Guy," "Lard Lady," and "Milk Man." Each card had a short bio of its character on the back, featuring the character's origin and outcome. Zero Heroes was a joint venture between General Mills and Donruss. There were 66 cards in the set, including a few non-character designs with various Zero Hero logos, a medal, a name tag, and a do-not-enter sign (presumably for a young boy's or girl's bedroom door).

=== Muppet Creative Consultant ===
In 1974 he became a puppeteer on Detroit-produced the Hot Fudge Show, a children's entertainment show starring Arte Johnson. At the same time, he worked for Jim Henson as a puppeteer and puppet designer. He is listed in the credits of the 1975 production, The Muppet Show: Sex and Violence, as Muppet Creative Consultant. He's done character design for Sesame Street (Sam the Robot) and The Muppet Show (Dr. Teeth and the Electric Mayhem). He was a writer and designer for Nickelodeon's Eureeka's Castle and "Time for Manners," for which he also created backgrounds.

=== National Lampoon ===
From 1975 to 1987, Taylor created a run of comic pages for the "Funny Pages" section of National Lampoon, including "Timberland Tales," "The Appletons," and "Stories from Uncle Kunta" His work first appeared in the 1975 special edition "National Lampoon's Very Large Book of Comical Funnies" with the comic strip "The Appletons," a family feature which supposedly ran in the 1950s. In October 1976, Taylor's "Timberland Tales" first appeared in the "Funny Pages" section of the National Lampoon. Over the next ten years, both strips ran in that section regularly, alternating from issue to issue.

=== Children's magazines ===
Taylor also contributed illustrations to children's magazines, including Highlights for Children and Scholastic's Hot dog! and Dynamite. In Hot dog! his illustrations were featured in a regular piece called "It's Not Fair!," a page of reader-submitted jokes based on the theme of unfairness, the best of which would be selected to appear in the next month's issue with an accompanying illustration by B.K.

=== Book illustration ===
Taylor's work has appeared in Scholastic Books, including 101 Silly Monster Jokes and 101 Nutty Nature Jokes as well as books for Sesame Street, such as Sesame Street 1, 2, 3 Storybook: Stories About the Numbers from 1 to 10. He has worked on several other humorous titles, including Would Somebody Please Send Me to My Room! A Hilarious Look at Family Life and I Run, Therefore I Am—Nuts!

=== Home Improvement ===
From 1991 to 1995, Taylor co-wrote five episodes of the popular Home Improvement:

- "Baby, It's Cold Outside" (1992)
- "Read My Hips" (1992)
- "I'm Scheming of a White Christmas" (1992)
- "'Twas the Blight Before Christmas" (1993)
- "Swing Time" (1994)

=== Disney ===
Taylor has also worked as a creative consultant for Walt Disney Feature Animation on Mulan, and other projects.

=== Movie design work ===
He was a production designer, costume designer, and voice actor for the 1989 movie, Moontrap. with Walter Koenig and Bruce Campbell.

=== Editorial cartooning ===
In 2009, Taylor illustrated a series of cartoons for a one-of-a-kind print media campaign focusing on the credit card interchange issue. The campaign was art directed by Jay Ragsdale with creative design from penczner media, for Unfaircreditcardfees.com. The campaign received national attention, and won the 2010 Reed Award for Best Public Advocacy Campaign.

== Bibliography ==
As Illustrator:

- Sesame Street 1, 2, 3 Storybook: Stories About the Numbers from 1 to 10, Emily Perl Kingsley, Jeffrey Moss, Norman Stiles and Daniel Wilcox (Authors), Joseph Mathieu, Kelly Oechsli, Mel Crawford and Bob Taylor (Illustrators), Random House (1973)
- Would Somebody Please Send Me to My Room! A Hilarious Look at Family Life, Bob Schwartz (Author), B. K. Taylor (Illustrator), Glenbridge Publishing, (May 2005), 320 pages
- I Run, Therefore I Am—Nuts!, Bob Schwartz (Author), Human Kinetics (August 6, 2001), 264 pages
- 101 Silly Monster Jokes, Jovial Bob Stine (Author), B. K. Taylor (Illustrator), Scholastic Paperbacks (October 1986), 94 pages
- 101 Nutty Nature Jokes, Melvin Berger (Author), B. K. Taylor (Illustrator), Scholastic Paperbacks (April 1994), 96 pages
- Anchovy Breath to Zoo Food: 175 Names to Call Your Brother When You're Mad, Jenny Davis (Author), B. K. Taylor (Illustrator), Avon Books (May 1994)
- It's Not Fair! Beth Goodman (Author), B.K. Taylor (Illustrator), Scholastic Book Services, 1988, 28 pages
- The Peanut Butter and Jelly Book
- I Run, Therefore I Am—STILL Nuts!, Bob Schwartz (Author), Human Kinetics (September 28, 2012), 264 pages

As co-author, illustrator:

- Make It Big in Business, B. K. Taylor (Author), Chatto Hill (Author), Doubleday Books (August 1985), 112 pages

As cover illustrator:

- Growing Up Catholic, Mary Jane Frances Cavolina (Author), Maureen Anne Teresa Kelly (Author), Jeffrey Allen Joseph Stone (Author), Richard Glen Michael Davis (Author), Growing Up Catholic (1983), 240 pages
- More Growing Up Catholic, Mary Jane Frances Cavolina Meara (Author), Jeffrey Allen Joseph Stone (Author), Maureen Anne Teresa Kelly (Author), Richard Glen Michael Davis (Author), Bob Kiley (Illustrator), Main Street Books; 1st edition (August 26, 1986), 125 pages
- Still Catholic After All These Years, Mary Jane Frances Cavolina (Author), Main Street Books; 1st edition (August 1, 1993), 110 pages
- I Run, Therefore I Am—Nuts!, Bob Schwartz (Author), Human Kinetics (August 6, 2001), 264 pages
- I Run, Therefore I Am—STILL Nuts!, Bob Schwartz (Author), Human Kinetics (September 28, 2012), 264 pages

== Sticker sets ==
- Odd Rods (1969 - 44 stickers)
- Odder Odd Rods (1970 – 66 stickers)
- Oddest Odd Rods (1970 – 66 stickers, numbered 67–132)
- Odd Rod All Stars (1971 – 66 stickers reprinted from the previous 3 series)
- Fabulous Odd Rods (1973 – a reprint of Odder Odd Rods)
- Fantastic Odd Rods series 1 (1973 – a reprint of Oddest Odd Rods, retaining the 67-132 numbering)
- Fantastic Odd Rods series 2 (66 new stickers numbered 1-66)
- Awesome All*Stars (1988 - 99 stickers)
- Baseball's Great Gross Outs (1989 - 88 stickers)

== Comic strips ==
In National Lampoons "Funny Pages" section, Taylor alternated between two and sometimes three strips of his creation:

- "The Appletons: A Saga of an American Family" - featured Helen, the earnest and clueless mom; Kathy and Bobby, the mischievous and somewhat less clueless kids; and Norm, the mischievous and subversive dad (imagine Ward Cleaver with a penchant for elaborate and dangerous practical jokes).
- "Timberland Tales" - featured Doctor Rogers, an earnest Mark Trail-type; his girlfriend Kathleen; Maurice the Indian Boy ("some call him the joker"), an unbelievably naive and bulbous teenager; and Constable Tom ("rumored to have a small amount of brain damage"), a dimwitted, musclebound Canadian Mountie. The latter two characters were featured much more frequently.
- "Stories of Uncle Kunta" - a less frequently run comic featuring a narrative format with impossible tall tales told to two white children by Uncle Kunta, a satiric cross between Walt Disney's Uncle Remus and Kunta Kinte from Roots, the blockbuster TV mini-series of the time.

In 2020, he released I Think He's Crazy-The Comics of B. K. Taylor, a compilation book of these and other comics.

In 2009, he illustrated an editorial strip for a public advocacy campaign commissioned by Unfair Credit Card Fees:

- "Interchange Able"

== Awards ==
Taylor's work has been recognized with several awards:

- Inkpot Award from Comic-Con International in 1980
- Gold Brick Award
- Caddy Awards (7)
- the Funny Bone Award
- ACE Award in 1990 for Eureeka's Castle
- 2010 Reed award for political cartooning
