= Radell =

Radell is both a surname and a given name. Notable people with the name include:

- Renée Radell (1929–2023), American painter
- Radell Lockhart (born 1979), American football player and coach
