= College for Creative Studies =

Private art school in Detroit, Michigan

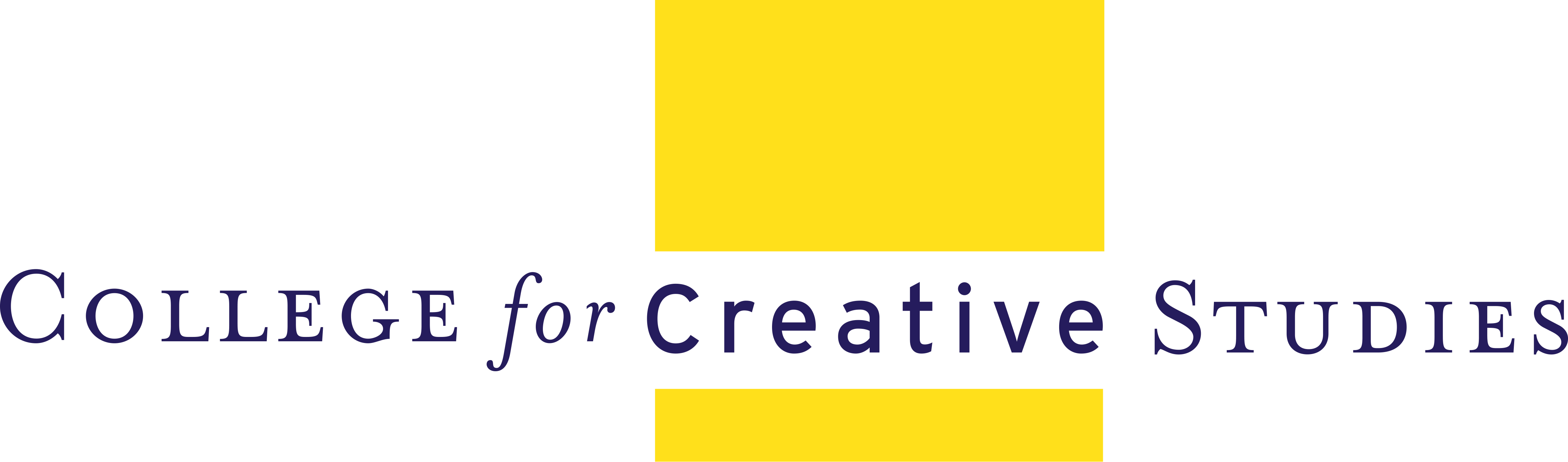
- Type: Private art school
- Established: 1906
- President: Don Tuski
- Undergraduates: 1,440
- Location: Detroit, Michigan, United States
- Campus: Urban
- Colors: PMS 109 (Gold), PMS 276 (Deep Purple)
- Mascot: Watson Peacock
- Website: ccsdetroit.edu

The College for Creative Studies (CCS) is a private art school in Detroit, Michigan. It enrolls more than 1,400 students and focuses on arts education. The college is also active in offering art education to children through its Community Arts Partnerships program and its Henry Ford Academy: School for Creative Studies.

== Academics ==
The college is authorized by the Michigan Education Department to grant bachelor's and master's degrees, and by the National Association of Schools of Art and Design and the Higher Learning Commission.

The college offers Bachelor of Fine Arts degrees in 13 majors and the Master of Fine Arts (MFA) degree.

== Notable faculty ==
- Susan Aaron-Taylor - section chairperson of the Fiber Design Department and Professor of the Crafts Department
- John Carroll
- Imre Molnar

== Notable alumni ==
- Jelani Aliyu - automobile designer, General Motors' senior program designer and director general of the Nigerian Automotive Design and Development Council
- Kevin Beasley - artist
- Harry Bertoia - Italian-born artist, sculptor and modern furniture designer
- Bob Boniface - automobile designer, General Motors Director of Design
- Doug Chiang - American film designer and artist
- Wendy Froud - doll-artist, sculptor and puppet-maker
- Ralph Gilles - president and CEO of the Street and Racing Technology/Motorsports and Senior Vice President of Design at Chrysler Group LLC of Stellantis
- Tyree Guyton - noted artist behind the Heidelberg Project
- Rosemary Hornak - American folk artist; art collector; philanthropist; and the sister of founding Photorealist and Hyperrealist artist, Ian Hornak.
- Chris Houghton - co-creator of Disney Channel animated series Big City Greens.
- John Krsteski - Chief Designer at Genesis USA
- David Lyon - designer, Pocketsquare Design worked for VinFast
- Paul Mobley – photographer and owner of Paul Mobley Studio
- Jerry Palmer - automobile designer and director for General Motors
- Joel Piaskowski – director of design, Ford Motor Company
- Renée Radell - artist
- Mary Lynn Rajskub- known for playing Chloe O'Brian in the Fox action-thriller 24
- Patrick Schiavone - vice president, design, North America region for Whirlpool Corporation
- Kevin Siembieda - co-founder of Palladium Books
- B. K. Taylor - illustrator and writer noted for his Odd Rods trading stickers, illustrations for Sick magazine and National Lampoon, and his writing for Home Improvement
