= Deane Rykerson =

American politician and architect

Member of the Maine House of Representatives from the 1st district
- In office December 5, 2012 – December 2, 2020
- Preceded by: Devin Beliveau
- Succeeded by: Kristi Mathieson

Personal details
- Born: December 18, 1950 (age 75) Dodge City, Kansas, U.S.
- Party: Democratic
- Education: Stony Brook University
- Website: Official Website

Deane Rykerson (born 18 December 1950) is an American politician and architect from Maine. A Democrat, Rykerson was first elected to the Maine House of Representatives in 2012. He represented District 151, which includes southern York County Kittery. An architect by training, Rykerson earned Bachelor of Arts degrees at Stony Brook University in New York in 1972 and Boston Architectural College in 1989 as well as a Masters in Architecture from Harvard University in 1996.
