= Kittery, Maine =

Town in Maine, United States

- Town
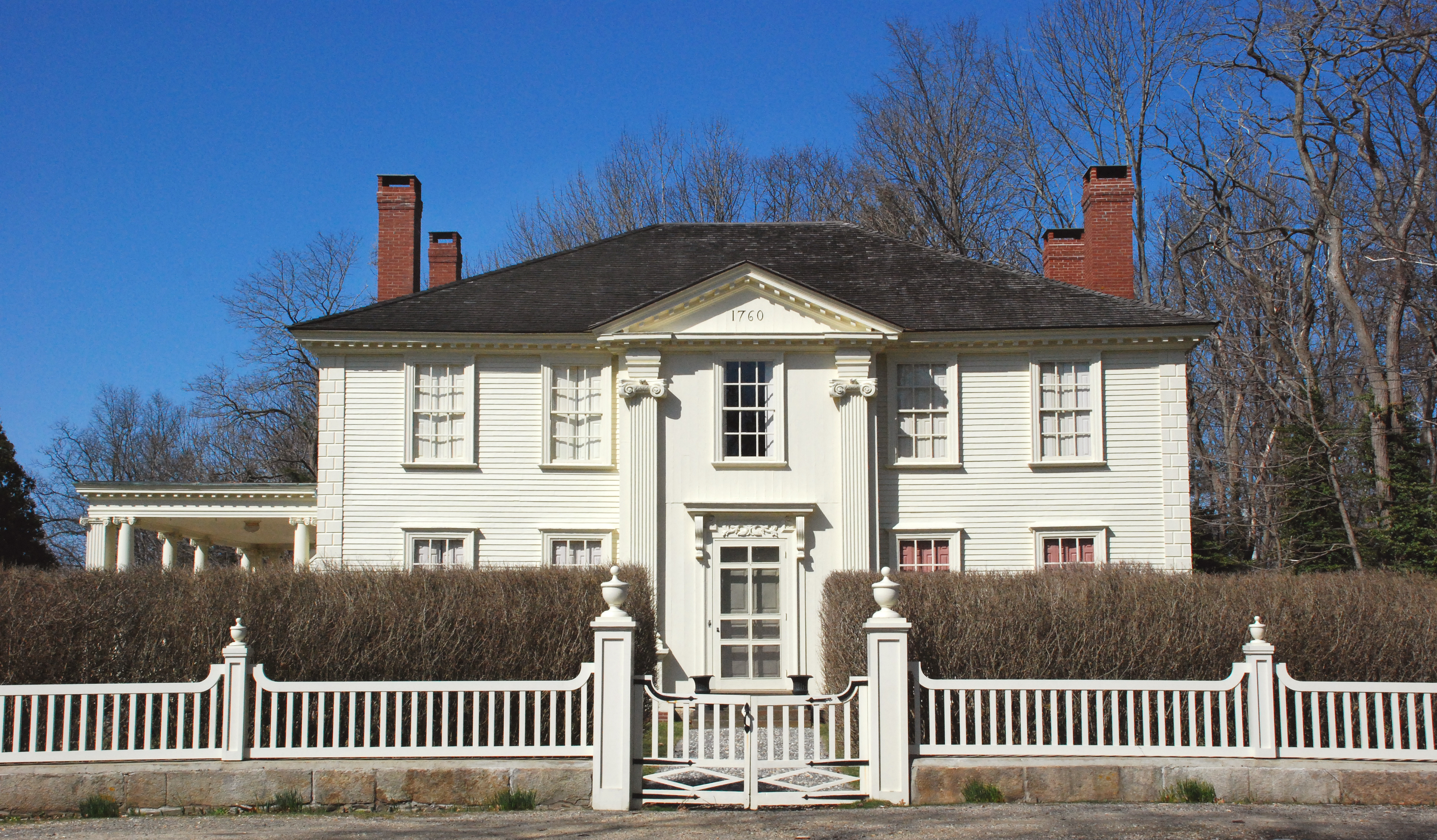
- Lady Pepperrell House at Kittery Point

- Flag Seal
- Motto: Gateway to Maine
- Location within Maine Location within the United States
- Coordinates: 43°05′35″N 70°43′41″W
- Country: United States
- State: Maine
- County: York
- Settled: 1623
- Incorporated: 1647

Area
  - Total: 75.30 sq mi (195.03 km^{2})
  - Land: 17.78 sq mi (46.05 km^{2})
  - Water: 57.52 sq mi (148.98 km^{2})
- Elevation: 0 ft (0 m)

Population (2020)
  - Total: 10,070
  - Density: 566/sq mi (218.7/km^{2})
- Time zone: UTC−5 (Eastern (EST))
  - Summer (DST): UTC−4 (EDT)
- ZIP Codes: 03904 (Kittery); 03905 (Kittery Point)
- Area code: 207
- FIPS code: 23-37270
- GNIS feature ID: 582544
- Website: www.kitteryme.gov

Kittery is a town in York County, Maine, United States, the oldest incorporated town in the state. Home to the Portsmouth Naval Shipyard on Seavey's Island, Kittery includes Badger's Island, the seaside district of Kittery Point, the village of Kittery, and part of the Isles of Shoals. The southernmost town in the state, it is a tourist destination known for its many outlet stores.

Kittery is part of the Portland-South Portland-Biddeford metropolitan area. The town's population was 10,070 at the 2020 census.

== History ==
English settlement around the natural harbor of the Piscataqua River estuary began about 1623. By 1632 the community was protected by Fort William and Mary on today's New Hampshire side of the river; in 1689 defensive works that later became Fort McClary in Kittery Point were added on today's Maine side to the north.

Kittery was incorporated in 1647, staking a claim as the "oldest incorporated town in Maine." It was named after the manor of Kittery Court at Kingswear in Devon, England, birthplace of a founder, Alexander Shapleigh. He arrived in 1635 aboard the ship Benediction, which he co-owned with another prominent settler, Captain Francis Champernowne, a cousin of Sir Ferdinando Gorges, lord proprietor of Maine. Together with the Pepperrell family, they established fisheries offshore at the Isles of Shoals, where fish were caught, salted, and exported to Europe. Other pioneers were hunters, trappers, and workers of the region's abundant timber.

Thomas Spencer, Esquire, immigrant from Gloucestershire, England, was also settler of Kittery, with his wife Patience Chadbourne.

Located opposite Portsmouth, New Hampshire, Kittery developed into a center for trade and shipbuilding. The township originally extended from the Atlantic Ocean inland up the Salmon Falls River, including the present-day towns of Eliot, South Berwick, Berwick, and North Berwick. In 1652, after the death of Gorges, Maine became part of the Massachusetts Bay Colony.

Francis Small was a pioneer resident of Kittery, and operated a trading post near the confluence of the Ossipee River and Saco River. Here major Indian trails converged—the Sokokis Trail (now Route 5), the Ossipee Trail (now Route 25), and the Pequawket Trail (now Route 113). The site supported the lucrative fur trade with the natives, but had the risks of living isolated in the wilderness. Small became the largest property owner in the history of Maine, and was known as "the great landowner".

In 1663, John Josselyn wrote: "Towns there are, are not many in this province. Kittery, situated not far from Passacataway (Portsmouth), is the most populous."

In late 1694 or early 1695 the enslaved woman Rachel of Kittery, Maine was murdered by her enslaver, Nathaniel Keen, in Kittery. During the colonial era in Kittery Parish, which included present-day Kittery, Eliot, Berwick and South Berwick, as many as 500 enslaved people were brought to Kittery Parish. The Maine Historical Society calls Sir William Pepperrell (1696 – 1759) of Kittery "Maine's most prolific and infamous slave owner."

In 1705, during Queen Anne's War, tribes of the Wabanaki Confederacy raided the town, killing six residents and taking five prisoners.

During the Revolution, the first vessels of the U.S. Navy were constructed on Badger's Island, including the USS Ranger (1777) commanded by John Paul Jones. The Portsmouth Naval Shipyard, the nation's first federal navy yard, was established in 1800 on Fernald's Island. It connects to the mainland by two bridges. During the Civil War, the facility rebuilt the USS Constitution, and built the Civil War USS Kearsarge. Seavey's Island was annexed and became site of the now defunct Portsmouth Naval Prison.

In 1905, the Treaty of Portsmouth, which formally ended the Russo-Japanese War, was signed at the shipyard.

From 1946 and 1977, when racial discrimination in public accommodations was common, Clayton and Hazel Sinclair operated the Rock Rest summer guest house in Kittery Point providing lodging to Black vacation travelers. The property was listed on the National Register of Historic Places in 2008. Rock Rest was featured in the 2020 documentary Driving While Black, that aired on PBS.

== Geography ==
According to the United States Census Bureau, the town has a total area of 75.30 sq mi (195.03 km^{2}), of which 57.52 sq mi (148.98 km^{2}) are covered by water. Situated beside the Gulf of Maine and Atlantic Ocean, Kittery is drained by Spruce Creek, Spinney Creek, Chauncey Creek, and the Piscataqua River.

Kittery is Maine's southernmost town. The town is crossed by Interstate 95, U.S. Route 1, Maine State Route 101, Maine State Route 103, and Maine State Route 236.

== Demographics ==
See also Kittery (CDP), Maine and Kittery Point, Maine for village demographics

Historical population
Census	Pop.	Note	%±
1790	3,259		—
1800	3,114		−4.4%
1810	2,019		−35.2%
1820	1,886		−6.6%
1830	2,202		16.8%
1840	2,435		10.6%
1850	2,706		11.1%
1860	2,974		9.9%
1870	3,333		12.1%
1880	3,230		−3.1%
1890	2,864		−11.3%
1900	2,872		0.3%
1910	3,533		23.0%
1920	4,763		34.8%
1930	4,400		−7.6%
1940	5,374		22.1%
1950	8,380		55.9%
1960	10,689		27.6%
1970	11,028		3.2%
1980	9,314		−15.5%
1990	9,372		0.6%
2000	9,543		1.8%
2010	9,490		−0.6%
2020	10,070		6.1%

=== 2010 census ===
As of the census of 2010, there were 9,490 people, 4,302 households, and 2,488 families living in the town. The population density was 533.7 inhabitants per square mile (206.1/km^{2}). There were 4,942 housing units at an average density of 278.0 per square mile (107.3/km^{2}). The racial makeup of the town was 97.1% White, 0.01% African American, 0.1% Native American, 1.1% Asian, 0.1% Pacific Islander, 0.5% from other races, and 1.5% from two or more races. Hispanic or Latino of any race were 2.6% of the population.

There were 4,302 households, of which 23.5% had children under the age of 18 living with them, 46.3% were married couples living together, 7.9% had a female householder with no husband present, 3.6% had a male householder with no wife present, and 42.2% were non-families. Of all households, 32.8% were made up of individuals, and 12.6% had someone living alone who was 65 years of age or older. The average household size was 2.17 and the average family size was 2.77.

The median age in the town was 43.2 years. 18.2% of residents were under the age of 18; 7.8% were between the ages of 18 and 24; 26% were from 25 to 44; 30.3% were from 45 to 64; and 17.7% were 65 years of age or older. The gender makeup of the town was 48.3% male and 51.7% female.

=== 2000 census ===
As of the census of 2000, there were 9,543 people, 4,078 households, and 2,528 families living in the town. The population density was 535.5 inhabitants per square mile (206.8/km^{2}). There were 4,375 housing units at an average density of 245.5 per square mile (94.8/km^{2}). The racial makeup of the town was 95.98% White, 1.78% Black or African American, 0.18% Native American, 0.65% Asian, 0.02% Pacific Islander, 0.45% from other races, and 0.94% from two or more races. Hispanic or Latino of any race were 1.50% of the population.

There were 4,078 households, out of which 27.7% had children under the age of 18 living with them, 50.1% were married couples living together, 8.6% had a female householder with no husband present, and 38.0% were non-families. Of all households, 29.4% were made up of individuals, and 10.6% had someone living alone who was 65 years of age or older. The average household size was 2.29 and the average family size was 2.86.

In the town, the population was spread out, with 21.9% under the age of 18, 7.4% from 18 to 24, 30.7% from 25 to 44, 24.8% from 45 to 64, and 15.2% who were 65 years of age or older. The median age was 39 years. For every 100 females, there were 94.8 males. For every 100 females age 18 and over, there were 92.1 males.

The median income for a household in the town was $52,200, and the median income for a family was $53,343. Males had a median income of $37,096 versus $29,850 for females. The per capita income for the town was $24,153. About 5.7% of families and 7.6% of the population were below the poverty line, including 11.9% of those under age 18 and 6.6% of those age 65 or over.

== Economy ==
The Kittery economy is driven by the Portsmouth Naval Shipyard. In 2021, 438 shipyard workers lived in Kittery and were paid a combined $37,784,774. According to the Seacoast Shipyard Association, which advocated against closure of the shipyard by the federal government in 2005, the shipyard's total economic effect on the region in 2022 was estimated to be $1,457,952,317, and in 2021 was estimated at $1,322,611,898. In 2022, 7,251 people were employed at the shipyard.

The Kittery Outlets is an outdoor shopping area located on U.S. Route 1 next to Interstate 95 with over 100 retailers, including national brands and local shops. The town in 2024 approved the removal of one of the shopping plazas, The Outlets at Kittery, to be replaced with apartment housing, a hotel, and a restaurant.

Kittery Foreside is a popular, walkable neighborhood adjacent to the Portsmouth Naval Shipyard that has many commercial businesses, including boutique shops, restaurants, and cafes. It also features historic homes, large shade trees, and a number of arts and culture organizations.

The Weathervane Restaurant chain was founded in Kittery in 1969. In 2023, the Portland Press Herald reported that Kittery has the highest per capita number of vegan and vegetarian restaurants and food businesses in Maine.

== Climate ==
=== Climate change ===
In Kittery, coastal property, shoreland infrastructure, and the Portsmouth Naval Shipyard are all vulnerable to rising seas caused by the changing climate. Most vulnerable are low-lying roads, the bridges to the Portsmouth Naval Shipyard, other bridges, businesses, a church, a fire station, and the working waterfront. To respond to these threats, the town formed a Climate Change Adaptation Committee.

== Arts and culture ==
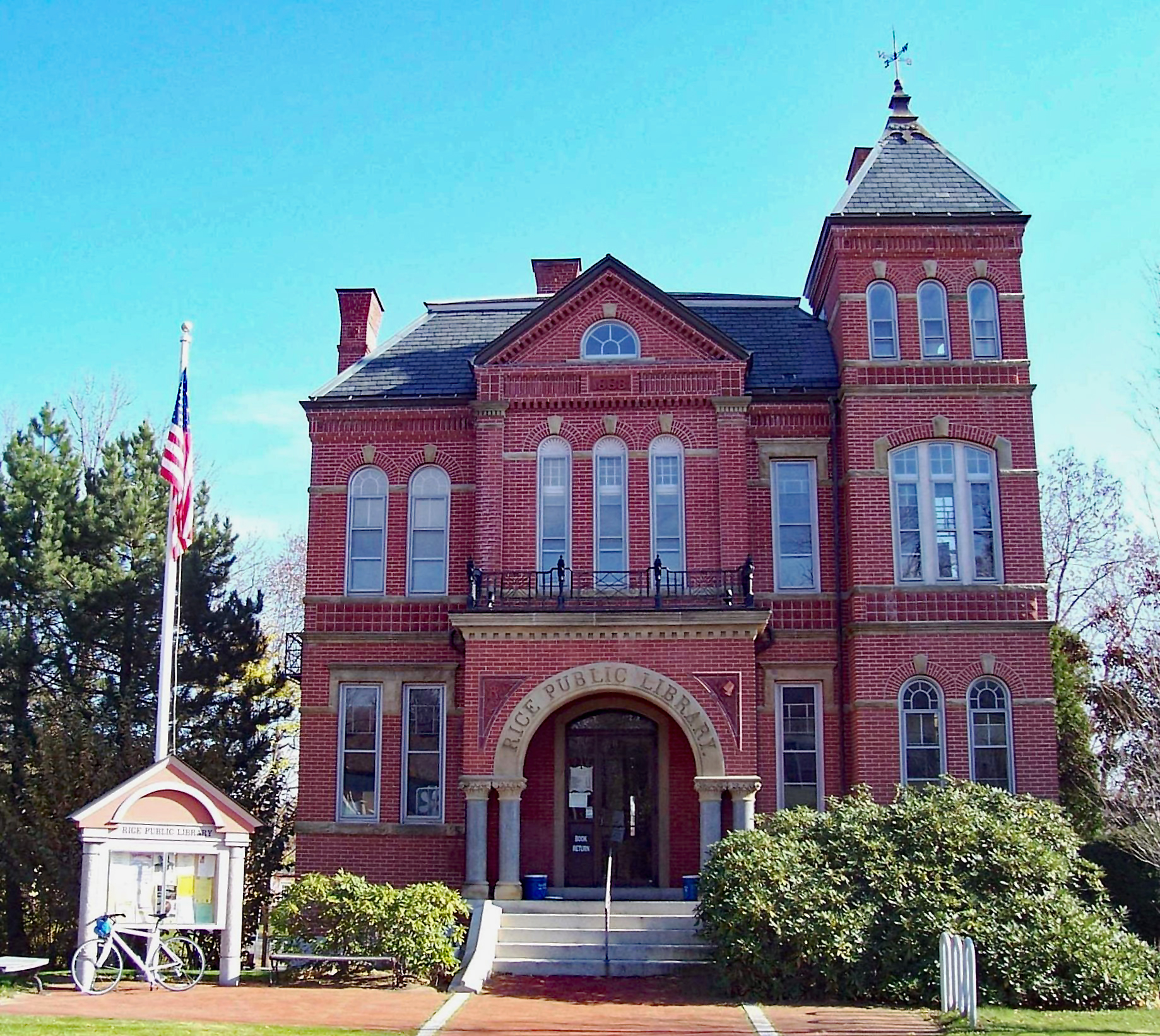
Rice Public Library was built in 1889

The Rice Public Library was built in 1889 at 8 Wentworth Street. The library reopened in 2022 after a $6.1 million renovation.

The Kittery Art Association was formed in 1958. It manages the KAA Gallery at 2 Walker Street in Kittery Foreside, as a cultural center and exhibition gallery. The Association purchased the gallery building in 2022 from the town library, where the property was known as the Taylor Building, for $558,700. The Kittery Art Association was formerly located at 8 Coleman Avenue in Kittery Point.

The nonprofit The Dance Hall is located in the former Grange Hall in Kittery Foreside. It hosts performances and classes in dance and music.

=== Sites of interest ===
Sites of interest include:

- John Bray House, built in 1662, believed to be the oldest extant house in Maine.
- Fort McClary State Historic Site
- John Paul Jones Memorial Park, which includes the Maine Sailors' and Soldiers' Memorial by Bashka Paeff.
- Kittery Community Center
- The Kittery Historical and Naval Museum, opened in 1977.
- Lady Pepperrell House, built in 1760.
- Rock Rest
- Seapoint Beach and Fort Foster, originally a harbor defense, at Kittery Point.
- William Pepperrell House, built in 1733
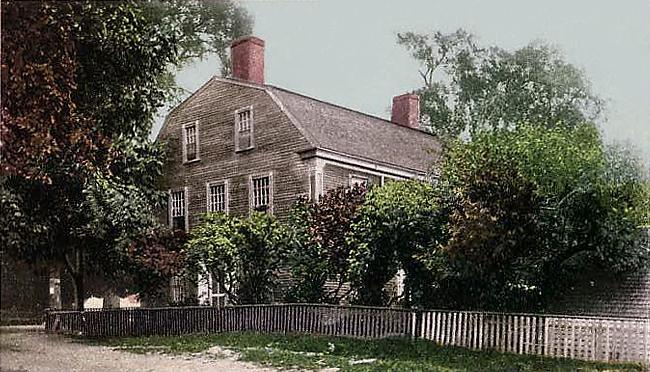
Pepperrell House c. 1905

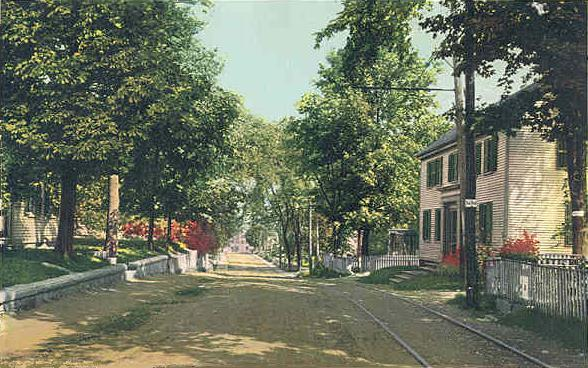
Government St. c. 1910

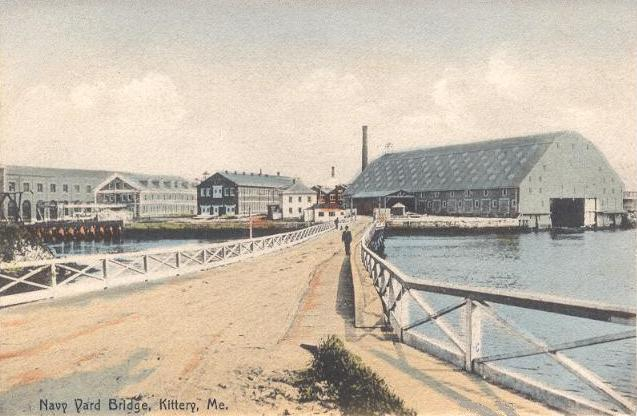
Navy Yard Bridge c. 1908

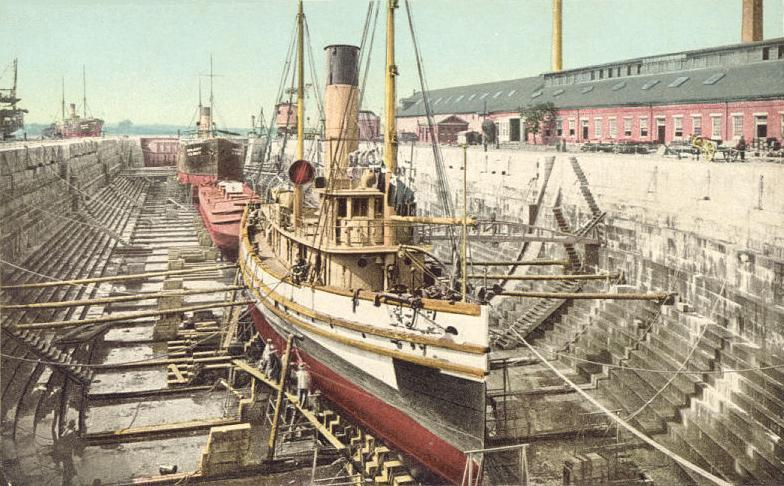
Shipyard dry dock c. 1908

== Parks and recreation ==
Kittery includes many parks, beaches, and recreational spaces. The largest is Fort Foster, a former federal military installation from the 19th century until the 1950s.

Other parks include

- John Paul Jones Memorial Park
- Fort McClary State Historic Site
- Inspiration Park
- Rogers Park Conservation Area
- Kittery Memorial Field
- Cutts Island Trail on the Rachel Carson Nature Preserve

Beaches include:

- Seapoint Beach
- Crescent Beach
- Fort Foster Horn Point—East Cove Beach
- Fort Foster Pier Beach
- Fort Foster Scuba Beach

== Education ==
Kittery is home to Robert William Traip Academy (9–12), a formerly private preparatory school which became public and town-run in 1967. Kittery is also home to Horace Mitchell Primary School (K–3) and Shapleigh School (4–8).

== In popular culture ==
The movie Thinner (1996), based on the 1984 Stephen King novel, was filmed in Kittery.

== Notable people ==
- Jess Abbott, guitarist of the band Now, Now
- William Badger, master shipbuilder
- William Black, first settler of bailey island
- Devin Beliveau, state representative
- John Haley Bellamy, woodcarver, folk artist
- George Berry, captain, shipbuilder
- Dennis C. Blair, admiral
- Scott Brown, ambassador, senator from Massachusetts
- Tunis Craven, naval officer
- Shem Drowne, metalworker, creator of Boston's Grasshopper Weathervane
- Elisha T. Gardner, Wisconsin politician, lawyer
- William Dean Howells, writer, magazine editor
- Sandi Jackson, Chicago city alderman
- Kenneth F. Lemont, state legislator
- Jeremiah O'Brien, naval officer
- John O'Hurley, television actor and game show host
- Joseph T. Palastra Jr., U.S. Army General
- Sir William Pepperrell, merchant, soldier
- Rachel of Kittery, Maine, an enslaved women who was murdered by her enslaver
- Arthur Shawcross, serial killer
- Hunt Slonem, artist
- Francis Small, trader and landowner
- Celia Thaxter, poet
- John Treworgie, last proprietary governor of Newfoundland
- Donald Valle (1908–1977), American businessman
- Walter Wheeler, state representative
- William Whipple, signer of the Declaration of Independence

== See also ==
- National Register of Historic Places listings in York County, Maine
- Portsmouth Naval Prison
- Portsmouth Naval Shipyard
