= Kittery Community Center =

- Frank C. Frisbee Elementary School
- U.S. National Register of Historic Places
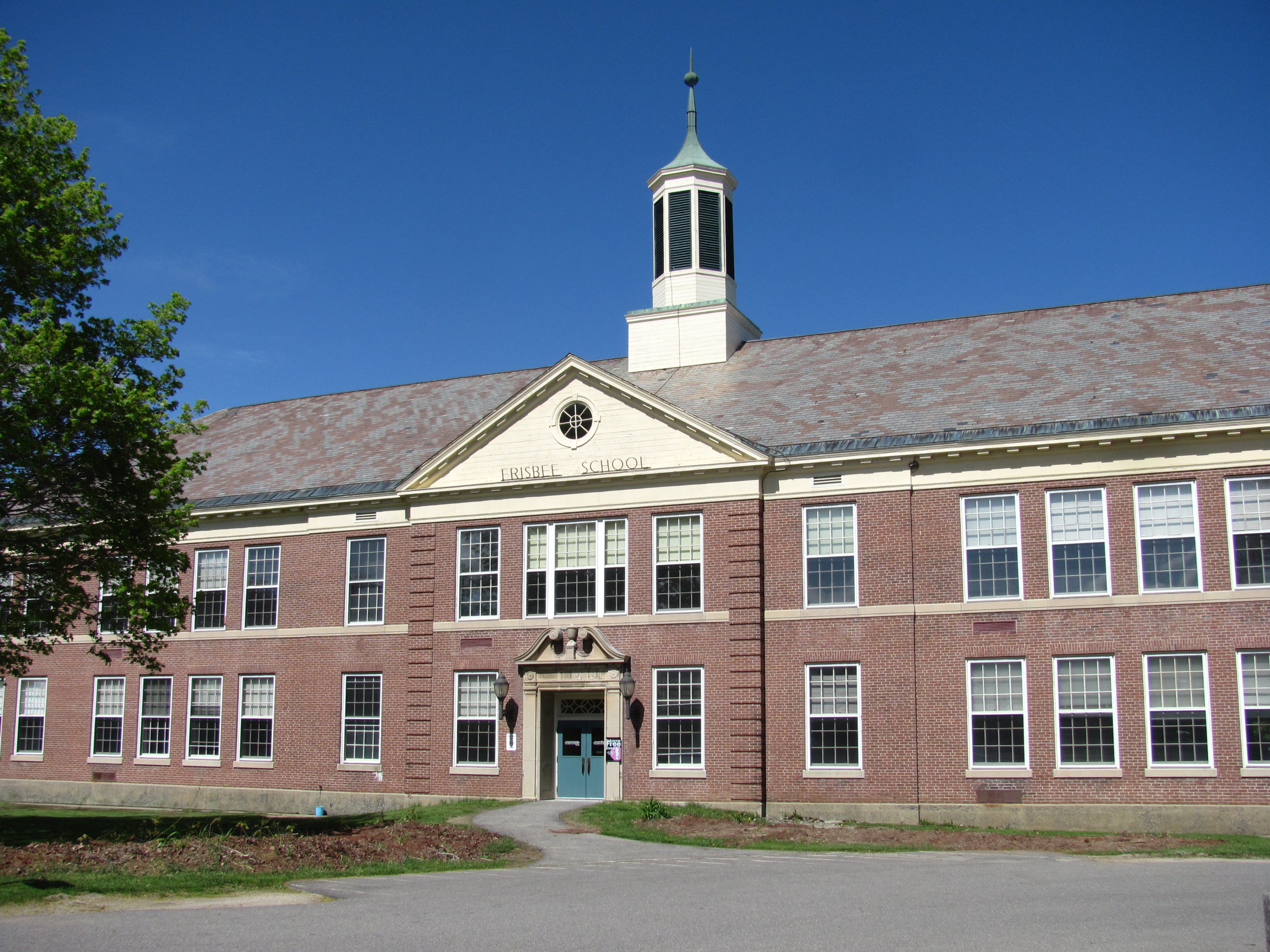

- Location within Maine Location within the United States
- Location: 120 Rogers Rd. Kittery, Maine
- Coordinates: 43°05′51″N 70°44′11″W
- Area: 12.64 acres (5.12 ha)
- Built: 1943
- Architect: Wells, Hudson & Granger
- NRHP reference No.: 12000229
- Added to NRHP: April 25, 2012

The Kittery Community Center is located in the former Frank C. Frisbee Elementary School at 120 Rogers Road in Kittery, Maine. The building, built in 1943 by the United States government as part of war-related expansions of Portsmouth Naval Shipyard, was listed on the National Register of Historic Places in 2015 for this association. It served Kittery as a school until 2009, and was converted for use as a multi-function community center providing space for arts, culture, and recreational activities in 2011-12.

== Description and history ==
The Kittery Community Center is located in the southern part of town on the east side of Rogers Road (Maine State Route 236) and west of an inlet of Spruce Creek, and accessed via Goodsoe Road. It is set amid the former school's athletic fields and surrounding woodlands, through which a trail network has been built. The building is a long multi-section structure, oriented northwest to southeast. The northernmost section, 23 bays long, is the oldest portion, built in 1941; it has a hip roof topped by cupola, and a slightly-projecting three-bay section at its center, where the original main entrance is located, framed by a pilastered and pedimented surround. Behind this block is the gymnasium/auditorium added in 1943, connected by what now serves as the Center's main entrance. South of this is the Annex built in 1951, which effectively doubled the school's size.

The Frisbee School was erected in 1941 under a contract issued by the federal War Public Works program. Because of World War II, the government was increasing work at the Portsmouth Naval Shipyard (located on islands today in southern Kittery in the Piscataqua River, then claimed by Portsmouth, New Hampshire), and built the school to meet the needs of the larger workforce employed there and housed at the new Admiralty Village development. It remained the property of the federal government until 1948, but was operated by the town as part of its school system. With the end of the Cold War, activity at the shipyard diminished, resulting in a general population decline in the area. The town closed the school in 2009, which underwent conversion to a community center in 2011-12.

== See also ==
- National Register of Historic Places listings in York County, Maine
