= Susan Aaron-Taylor =

American artist (born 1947)

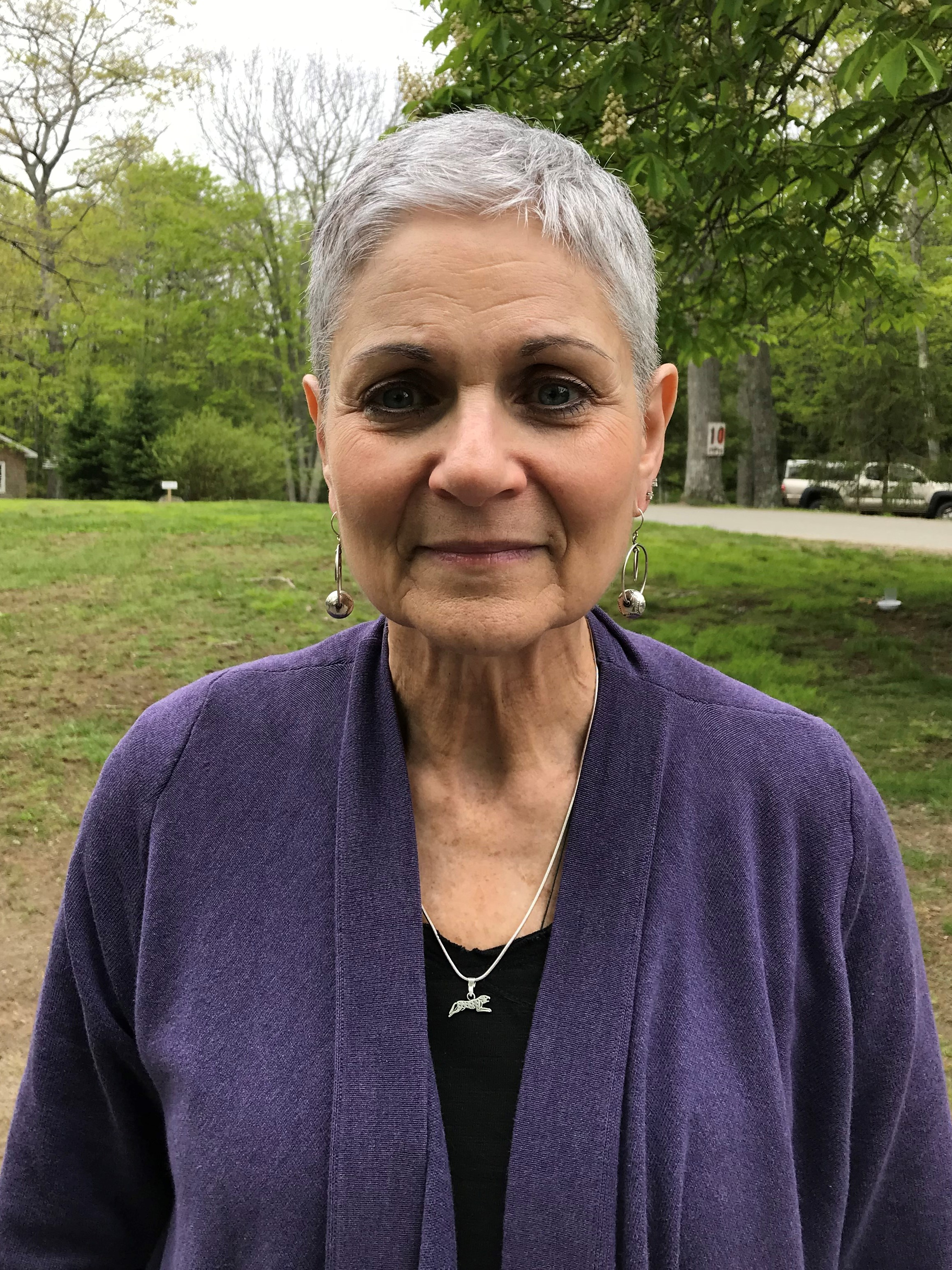
- Born: Susan Aaron; July 1947 (age 79); Brooklyn, New York, U.S.
- Education: Wayne State University (BSc); Cranbrook Academy of Art (MFA)
- Known for: Her art works which are deeply rooted in traditions of alchemy/creative fantasy.
- Notable work: Soul Shard #30, 2006

Susan Aaron-Taylor (née Aaron; born July 1947) is an American artist who creates mixed-media sculptures. For forty years she was a professor at the Crafts Department of the College for Creative Studies, Detroit, Michigan. Her work is abstract and surreal, stemming from alchemy and focusing on story-telling with dream-like qualities.

== Biography ==
Susan Aaron was born in July 1947 in Brooklyn, New York. She lives and creates art works in Pleasant Ridge, Michigan.

== Career ==
She earned a Bachelor of Science at Wayne State University and a Master of Fine Arts at Cranbrook Academy of Art. She served as the Section Chairperson of the Fiber Design Department. and Professor of the Crafts Department at the College for Creative Studies for over 40 years in Detroit, Michigan. When she retired, Aaron-Taylor was granted emeritus status.

Aaron-Taylor is known for her artworks that draw inspiration from her knowledge of alchemy, story-telling, chemistry, Jungian psychology, philosophy, archetypes, and the Collective Unconscious. She has exhibited for over thirty years and her work has been included in permanent as well as private collections.

=== Style and technique ===
Aaron-Taylor has created a body of artwork that consists of modest-sized sculptural objects which depict fantasy-like figures recalled from her dreams, including dogs, cats and other small creatures. The distortions from the anatomical correctness of the objects results from a practice of using tree roots, affixing felt in multiple colors for the basis of the core figure's form. She hand-processes her own felt. which she uses emulate an animal's pelt. She incorporates other natural and man-made materials, such as gemstones, pieces of metal, teeth and bone. She uses meditation and Jungian imagery as a source for inspirations.

One of Aaron-Taylor's most prominent work was in the Dreamscapes and Soul Shards series which focuses on the psychology of marriage, dreams, and turning the ordinary into the extraordinary. The Soul Shards series focuses on the retrieval of these broken pieces of soul.

My dreams have been sourcing my creative life for over three decades. I continue to delight in discovering their essence, distilling and then sharing that one magical moment. My goal is to create clear, psychologically charged vignettes... I play with the symbols in my dreams as I embrace and tease out images from my unconscious that inspire and bring forth poignancy, humor and meaning.

Before creating a series and gathering her materials, Aaron-Taylor will research her pieces to build upon her ideas to enhance the story-telling process. She believes that the process of making a piece is journey and as a long-time student of the Jungian psychology, most of her work comes from dreams that are a direct response from her interest in The Tarot, shamanism, ritual, alchemy, archetypes, and the collective unconscious. She brings forth parts from her dreams that bring poignancy, humor, and meaning.

=== Significant works ===
- Deity series
- Dreamscape series
- Dream Games series
- Threshold series
- Soul Shard series
- Teapot Series
- Journeying Series
- Endangered Species Series

=== Shows and collections ===
- Selected one-person exhibitions
- Soul Shard #30, 2006; Wayne State University Art Permanent Collection, Detroit, MI
- Deity VIII, 1990; Cranbrook Art Museum Permanent Collection No. CAM 1992.17, Cranbrook Academy of Art, Bloomfield Hills, MI.
- Renaissance Center, Commissioned Wall Relief - Westin Hotels, Detroit, MI
- K-Mart Corporation, Permanent Collection, Troy, MI

=== Reviews and essays ===
- Dennis Alan Nawrocki; Steve Panton; Matthew Piper. "Essay'd 3: 30 Detroit artists". Wayne State University Press (2018). ISBN 9780814345870.
- Green, Roger. "Personal Paths In her mixed-media sculptures, Susan Aaron-Taylor re-creates the landscape of her dreams, informed by Carl Jung's spiritually charged concepts." American Craft Council 70, no. 6 (2010):30. ISSN 0194-8008.
- Carl Kamulski; Sisson Gallery. "2010 Motor City Revue: 38 Detroit artists". Henry Ford Community College (2010). OCLC 608538323.
