= Samuel Montefiore Waxman =

American academic (1885–1980)

Samuel Montefiore Waxman (October 23, 1885 — June 6, 1980) was Professor of Romance languages at Boston University from 1910 to 1955, and chair of the department from 1937 to 1955. He continued to lecture at the University until 1970. He was honored with a festschrift in 1969.

His bequest established a fund in 1980 for the purchase of rare books relating to the history of ideas. The Samuel M. Waxman Collection, which also includes extensive holdings in the fields of Spanish, Portuguese, Italian and French literature and history, forms a part of the Howard Gotlieb Archival Research Center at Boston University.

He was married to painter Frances Burwell Sheafer, who died in 1938, and then to sculptor Bashka Paeff.

== Works ==
- Waxman, Samuel Montefiore (1912). Chapters on magic in Spanish literature (Ph.D.). Harvard University. hdl:2027/hvd.32044014274799. OCLC 77000911. OL 13144287W.
- Waxman, Samuel Montefiore (1916). A trip to South America: exercises in Spanish composition. Heath's modern language series. Boston, New York [etc.]: D. C. Heath & co. hdl:2027/uc2.ark:/13960/t6348kd5m. LCCN 16003118. OCLC 2749362. OL 148003W.
- Waxman, Samuel Montefiore (1926). Antoine and the théâtre-libre. Cambridge: Harvard University Press. hdl:2027/uc1.b3544937. LCCN 26005554. OCLC 336355. OL 148004W.
- Waxman, Samuel Montefiore (1931). A bibliography of the belles-lettres of Santo Domingo. Bibliographies of Spanish-American literature. Harvard Council on Hispano-American Studies. Cambridge, Mass: Harvard University Press. hdl:2027/txu.059173018111629. OCLC 972960.
- Waxman, Samuel Montefiore (1935). A bibliography of the belles-lettres of Venezuela. Bibliographies of Spanish-American literature. Harvard Council on Hispano-American Studies. Cambridge, Mass: Harvard University Press. LCCN 35002805. OCLC 150656449.
