= Walter Wheeler (politician) =

American politician

Walter A. Wheeler Sr.

Member of the Maine House of Representatives
- In office December 1, 2004 – December 1, 2010
- Preceded by: Troy Jackson
- Succeeded by: Devin Beliveau
- Constituency: 151st District
- In office December 4, 2002 – December 1, 2004
- Preceded by: Stephen Estes
- Succeeded by: Troy Jackson
- Constituency: 1st District

Personal details
- Born: November 13, 1925 Manchester, Maine
- Died: February 14, 2017 (aged 91) Kittery, Maine
- Party: Democratic

Walter A. Wheeler, Sr. (November 13, 1925 – February 14, 2017) was an American politician and World War II veteran from Maine. A Democrat from Kittery, Maine, Wheeler served four terms in the Maine House of Representatives from 2002 to 2010. He served in the United States Navy 1943 – 1946 during World War II in the Pacific, Atlantic and European theaters. He was born in Manchester, Maine and died in Kittery, Maine on February 14, 2017, at the age of 91.
