= Imre Molnar (educator) =

Hungarian-born educator

Imre Molnar (1951 – December 28, 2012) was a Hungarian-born educator who served as the provost of the College for Creative Studies (CCS) in Detroit.

== Early life and education ==
Molnar was born in Hungary and raised in Australia. He obtained a bachelor's degree from the National Art School in Sydney and a Master of Fine Arts from the Art Center College of Design.

== Career ==
Molnar worked as a design director at Patagonia, and as director of operations at Hauser Inc, a design consultancy firm. Additionally, he served as a faculty member and administrator at the Art Center College of Design.

In 2001, Molnar became the dean of the College for Creative Studies (CCS) in Detroit, where he was responsible for overseeing faculty, curriculum, and academic resources. He contributed to the development of CCS's Transportation Design programs, drawing on his experience and connections within the automotive industry.
