= Kinsale Shark Awards =

Irish international advertising and creative festival

- Description: Advertising and creative awards
- Location: Kinsale, County Cork
- Country: Ireland
- Presented by: The Shark Awards
- Eligibility: International
- First award: 1962; 64 years ago
- Website: kinsalesharks.com

The Kinsale Shark Awards, commonly referred to as the Kinsale Sharks or the Shark Awards, is an international advertising and creative festival founded in 1962 and traditionally held in Kinsale, County Cork, Ireland. The festival recognizes work in advertising, design, digital media, short film and music video.

Events associated with the awards are held in Kinsale as well as in Brighton, London and Dublin.

== History ==
The festival was established in 1962 in Kinsale as a competition focused on television, radio and cinema commercials, and is Ireland's longest running Advertising Awards festival. The festival was originally called the International Festival of Ireland, but was rebranded in 1998 as the Sharks because of Kinsale's shark fishing tradition.

The festival continued during the 2010s and was held in Kinsale in 2016, 2017, 2018, 2019 and 2020, with adjustments in 2020 due to the COVID-19 pandemic.

Notable festival award nominees and winners include Jeshi, Bloom Twins, Billie Marten and others.

== Description ==
The competition's jury is drawn from creative directors, directors, designers, producers and other practitioners in advertising, design and production. Judges view shortlisted work in Kinsale and vote using an electronic scoring system, with final decisions reviewed using a scoreboard interface. The advertising, digital and social categories are judged in Kinsale over several days each September.

The festival runs four main events across the year:

- Advertising (September, in Kinsale)
- Design (November)
- Short Films (February)
- Music Video (May)

In addition to these, the organization runs a "Young Shark" or "Best New Talent" competition aimed at emerging creatives, including a script competition.

== See also ==
- List of advertising awards
- Cannes Lions International Festival of Creativity
- Clio Awards
