= John Paul Jones Memorial Park =

- U.S. National Register of Historic Places
- U.S. Historic district
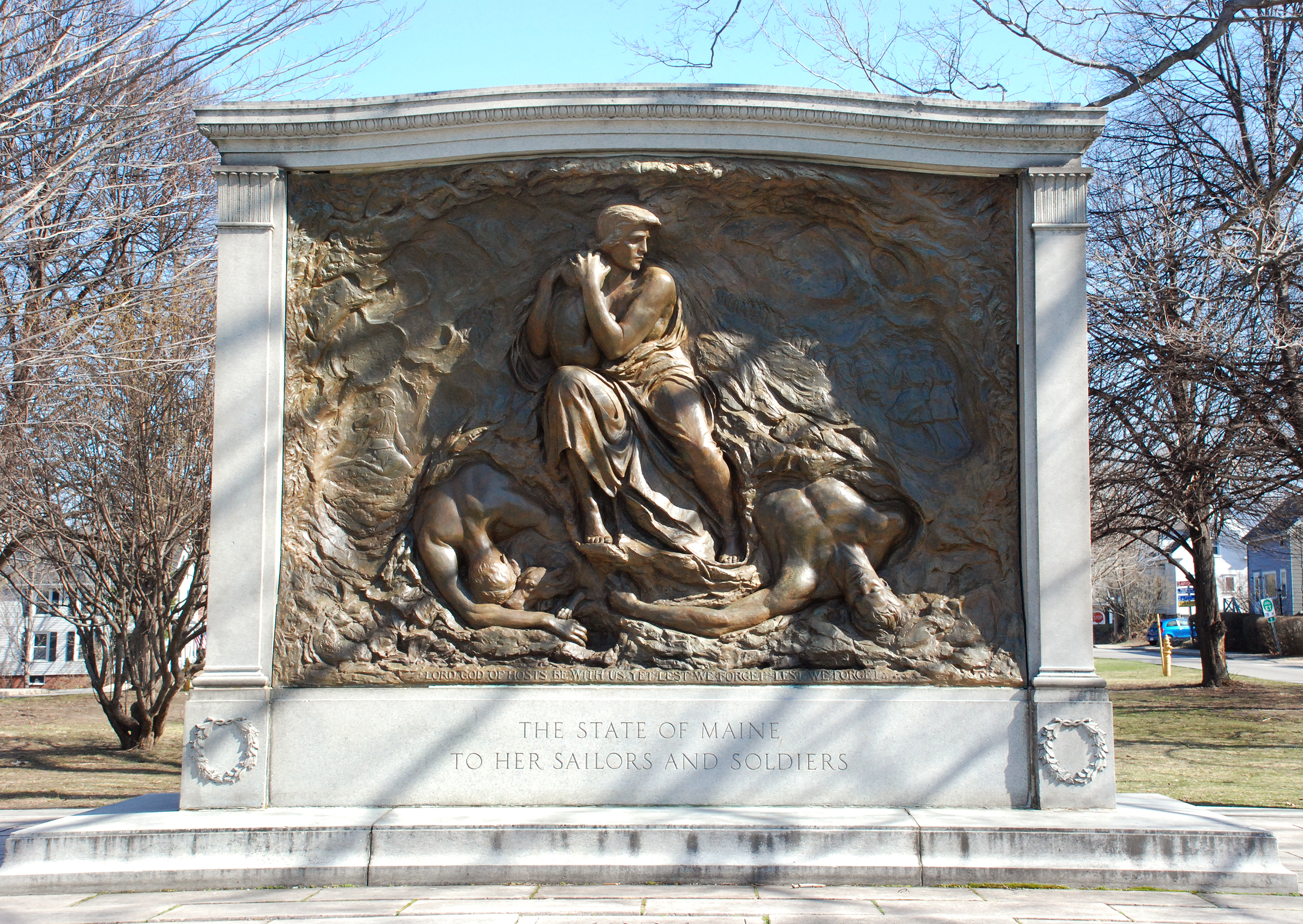
- Memorial sculpture of Bashka Paeff

- Location within Maine Location within the United States
- Location: Bounded by Newmarch St. and Hunter Ave., Kittery Foreside, Maine
- Coordinates: 43°5′6″N 70°45′2″W
- Area: 2 acres (0.81 ha)
- Built: 1924
- Sculptor: Bashka Paeff (memorial)
- NRHP reference No.: 97001639
- Added to NRHP: January 7, 1998

John Paul Jones Memorial Park is a municipal park in the town of Kittery, Maine. The trapezoidal park, flanked by the lanes of United States Route 1 approaching the Memorial Bridge across the Piscataqua River, was established in 1926 and named for American Revolutionary War naval hero John Paul Jones. Its centerpiece is a memorial commemorating the soldiers and sailors of the state of Maine, designed by Bashka Paeff. The park was listed on the National Register of Historic Places in 1998.

== Description and history ==
John Paul Jones Memorial Park is located between Hunter and Newmarch Streets in southern Kittery, just north of the Piscataqua River. The two roadways carry one-way traffic in opposite directions, to and from the Memorial Bridge to Badger's Island and Portsmouth, New Hampshire. The park is roughly 2 acres (0.81 ha), in size, and trapezoidal in shape. It is mostly a flat grassy area, with trees fringing the border and a few specimen trees dotting the park. The southern end of the park is dominated by the Soldiers and Sailors Memorial sculpture of Bashka Paeff, a gold bronze relief sculpture set in a granite frame mounted on a stone plaza.

The park is home to three other memorial, all placed in the park after its establishment. The Sloop Ranger monument, originally placed on Badger's Island in 1905, was moved to the park in 1963; it is a bronze tablet mounted in granite, commemorating USS Ranger, Jones' first command. The Province of Maine Monument is a bronze tablet mounted in a circular granite pedestal, placed in 1931; it memorializes the chartering of the English Province of Maine to Sir Ferdinando Gorges in 1635. The third memorial is to the United States Marine Corps, and was placed in 1984.

The park's construction is intimately bound to the construction of the original Memorial Bridge, which is a war memorial to the military of both Maine and New Hampshire who served in World War I. The bridge was completed in 1923, and Governor Percival Baxter held a design competition for a suitable memorial. Paeff's initial design was acceptable to Baxter, but not his successor, Ralph Owen Brewster, and the memorial was consequently not placed until 1926, after Paeff made alterations to its design. The park was officially named for John Paul Jones by an act of the state legislature in 1927, somewhat obscuring the intent that it be a memorial to World War I soldiers.

== See also ==
- National Register of Historic Places in York County, Maine
