= William Black (pioneer) =

Formerly enslaved man who settled in Maine

William Black (b. c. 1690 - 1762) Was an African American man who was the first settler of Bailey Island in the Province of Massachusetts Bay in an area that would later become part of the states of Maine.

== Biography ==
William Black was born near Kittery c. 1690 was the son of a former enslaved man born in Africa (possibly present-day Senegambia or Ghana) named Black Will and a white woman named Alice Hanscom, his birth was a scandal between the two because of segregation laws around the time. William's father was an African born child who was brought over to America by a man named Nicholas Shapleigh, a wealthy English trader and shipbuilder who would later become his master and caretaker, the Shapleigh family appreciated him so much that they gave him his own house and paid him for his labor, however a tragedy would soon take place where Nicholas would die from a blow to the back of the head from a small ship mast on April 29, 1682. This opportunity granted Black Will his freedom by Nicholas's nephew John who had taken ownership of Black Will and his assets after he had perished and was freed in the year 1700 after several more years of labor, this is probably because his master, John did not want to financially support Black Will's son, Black Will Jr. (later known as William Black)

== Bailey Island ==
William went on to buy land in Berwick and in 1714 and proceed to fall in love with his future wife, a white woman named Elizabeth Turbet (Varies between Turbot) however, like before intermarriage among the whites and blacks back then was prohibited due to puritan laws. However this wouldn't stop them as they continued to have a relationship with one another before word spread of it and were both punished, however William's punishment is unknown while Elizabeth seems to have been whipped a total of 20 times. Soon after that William eventually moved his family up the coast to the island then known as Capenawagen. William then proceeded to build his cabin on Water Cove, near the strait that now bears his name. By the time English authorities got around to assigning boundaries and land rights, Capenawagen was generally known as Will’s Island.

A man came by later on named William Dudley, son of the former Governor Joseph Dudley, William Dudley was a man known for his land investments and later requested for “the island whereon said Black Will doth reside, commonly called Capenawagen.” seemingly behind William Black that same year, however Mr. Dudley later died in 1743 before he could ever inhabit the land himself, meaning the land was still William's.

He and his wife Elizabeth died in 1762 leaving the land to his son William Jr. However he later left the Island leaving it to the new Deacon Timothy Bailey and his family, there are multiple tales on how Timothy had gotten the land, whether he found a loophole of them being squatters or if they were rather just witnesses to the sale, William Jr. later married and had two children with Mary Black, His half first cousin before moving across the strait to Orr's Island and buying one hundred and fifty-four acres from Joseph Orr.

== Legacy ==
There's a bridge that exists between Orr's Island and Bailey Island named after him known as "Will's Gut."

Descendants of William can still be found on Orr's Island in the Casco Bay area.

== DNA ==
His descendants DNA shows signs of Native-American DNA markers from that same branch of the Family tree, just like how Captain James Sinnett described that they "Were of mixed breed, having in their veins the blood of the Anglo-Saxon, Indian, and African Races."
