= Odd Rods =

Odd Rods was a group of non-sports trading card/sticker series created by the Donruss company beginning in 1969. The original series, entitled Odd Rods, introduced the theme of the series in 44 stickers: monsters in cars. Done by cartoonist/illustrator/writer B. K. Taylor in a style influenced by the work of Ed "Big Daddy" Roth, the series proved very popular with schoolchildren of the time, resulting in a string of sequel series:

- Odder Odd Rods (1970 - 66 stickers)
- Oddest Odd Rods (1970 - 66 stickers, numbered 67-132)
- Odd Rods All Stars (1971 - 66 stickers reprinted from the previous three series)
- Fabulous Odd Rods (1973 - a reprint of Odder Odd Rods)
- Fantastic Odd Rods Series 1 (1973 - a reprint of Oddest Odd Rods, retaining the 67-132 numbering)
- Fantastic Odd Rods Series 2 (66 new stickers numbered 1-66).

A related sticker series put out by Donruss in this era was Silly Cycles (66 stickers) with monsters on motorcycles. Another series was Fiends and Machines (66 stickers) which had a mix-and-match theme: 33 cards with monsters on top, and 33 with cars on the bottom, allowing the collector to put the 33 monsters on any of the 33 cars.

In 1980, Topps made a series similar to Odd Rods titled Weird Wheels.

== Acquisition ==
In 2006, the Odd Rods trademark and artwork was acquired and the mark registered with the U.S. Trademark Office. The official Odd Rods website is now active.

Odd Rods became the subject of an ownership dispute in 2010.

== Odd Rods (first series (1969)) sticker titles ==
- #1 Big Daddy
- #2 Mistua Mustang
- #3 Gee-Tee-O
- #4 Powered By Junk
- #5 Bad Start
- #6 Blower Bracket
- #7 Mad Dragger
- #8 Hemi Sprint
- #9 Hill Climber
- #10 Super Stuff
- #11 Imported Animal
- #12 Big Fink
- #13 Gas Eater
- #14 Chrome Coffin
- #15 Ram Charger
- #16 Let's Drag Hog
- #17 Rocker Racer
- #18 Draggin Machine
- #19 Share Cropper
- #20 Mad Shifter
- #21 H2O Go
- #22 Super Shift
- #23 So What
- #24 Volks Rule
- #25 Fords Breakfast of Chevys
- #26 Mini-Quick
- #27 Beach Bunny
- #28 Plumbers Delight
- #29 Mini-Quick
- #30 Chevy Killer
- #31 Dragon Lady
- #32 Wild Angle
- #33 Ford Killer
- #34 Bug Repellent
- #35 Happiness Is a Low E.T.
- #36 Mister Lifter
- #37 O.L.T. (Out To Lunch)
- #38 Weekend Warrior
- #39 The Shaker
- #40 Road Runner
- #41 Bonzai Bomb
- #42 Panic Mouse
- #43 Mad Hatcher
- #44 King Cougar

== See also ==
- Helmet sticker
