= Sick (magazine) =

American humor magazine

- Editor: Joe Simon
- Categories: Satirical magazine
- Frequency: Monthly
- Publisher: Crestwood Publications (1960–1968); Hewfred Publications (1968–1976); Charlton Comics (1976–1980)
- Founder: Joe Simon
- Founded: 1960
- Final issue: 1980
- Country: United States
- Language: English

Sick is a satirical-humor magazine published from 1960 to 1980, lasting 134 issues.

== Overview ==
Sick was created in 1960 by comic-book writer-artist Joe Simon, who also edited the title until the late 1960s. His son Jim Simon edited the magazine for several issues in 1976 to 1977. The magazine was published by Crestwood Publications until issue #62 (1968), when it was taken over by Hewfred Publications. Charlton Comics took over publishing the magazine in 1976 with issue #109.

Sick 's original mascot was a blank-faced little physician. He was later replaced by a mascot named Huckleberry Fink, whose design was similar to that of Mad's Alfred E. Neuman, and whose motto, instead of Neuman's "What, me worry?", was "Why Try Harder?"

Its contributors included Mad regulars Angelo Torres and Jack Davis, as well as Howard Cruse, Arnold Drake, Ernie Schroeder, Washington correspondent Jim Atkins, and B.K. Taylor. Its art director from 1961 until his death in 1967 was the noted comic-book artist Bob Powell.

In his book American Comic Book Chronicles 1960–1964, comic book historian John Wells comments:

Where Cracked was content as a mimic, Sick took its title as a mission statement. Published by Crestwood Publications (whose color comics imprint was Prize Comics), issue #1 (September 1960) declared itself "a grim collection of revolting humor." Financed by Teddy Epstein and packaged by industry legend Joe Simon, the magazine was built on the more tasteless, politically incorrect humor dispensed by stand-up comics like the controversial Lenny Bruce. The comedian is said to have bought 100 copies of any issue of Sick featuring excerpts on his routines that he then mailed to prospective clients. Discussing Sick #1, Simon wrote:

"I have found a humor writer named Dee Caruso who had been writing comedy routines and one-liners for some of the leading theatrical comic personalities. Dee got some of his collaborators together and they wrote the entire book as if it were a routine for a stand-up comedian such as Don Adams or Joey Bishop, both of whom had bought Dee’s material. Transforming these ‘wordy’ routines to eye-catching graphics was a problem but our artists got into the spirit and did well."

== See also ==
- Sick comedy
