= DMACS Awards =

The Digital Media Advertising Creative Showcase (DMACS) was a Los Angeles, California based organization that recognized creative talent in digital and rich media marketing for the entertainment industry. The DMACS provided a showcase for digital advertising and explored the tops trends in digital marketing.

== History ==
The DMACS was first held in May 2006 (and was then called the I.M.A.C.S.). The showcase grew into a more formal awards show in 2009. In 2010, the awards were retired.

The DMAC awards were awarded for ads or a set of rich media ads used to promote these five categories:

- Theatrical Release Rich Media Ad(s)
- Home Entertainment Release Rich Media Ad(s)
- Broadcast Television Launch Rich Media Ad(s)
- Video Game Release Rich Media Ad(s)
- Multi-Channel Cross Media Campaign

Additionally, the DMACS presented a YouTube Creative Award for any home entertainment, theatrical movie, video game or broadcast television program campaign creative that included YouTube in its execution. The awards ceremony was held in October at the Director’s Guild in Los Angeles. The DMACS 2010 was sponsored by Doubleclick by Google.

== Previous Winners ==
=== 2009 Winners ===
- Best Theatrical Release Rich Media Campaign: Star Trek - Paramount Pictures and Avatarlabs
- Best Home Entertainment Rich Media Campaign: Wall-E – Walt Disney Studios and Deadline Advertising
- Best Multi-Channel Cross Media Campaign: Coraline – Laika Studios/Focus Features and Widen + Kennedy
- YouTube Creative Award: My Bloody Valentine – Lionsgate and The Visionaire Group

== Related Links ==
- Digital Advertising
- Webby Awards
- Key Art Awards
