= Rachel of Kittery, Maine =

17th-century slave murdered by her owner

Rachel of Kittery, Maine (died 1695) was a slave in what is now the U.S. state of Maine who was murdered by her owner, Nathaniel Keen, who was subsequently put on trial for murder by the Province of Massachusetts Bay. The trial established court precedent in the New England colonies for how juries ruled on murder cases that involved an slave-owner murdering a slave. The only documentation that she existed is several paragraphs in the Province and Court Records of Maine. She was called Rachel and lived in the town of Kittery in York County, Maine.

== Trial ==
Nathaniel Keen was arrested and charged with the murder of Rachel on or about May 1, 1695, with the trial being held on May 16, 1695. "Superior Court held at Kittery for York County, present Thomas Danforth, Elisha Cook, and Samuel Sewall, justices." Sewall was a strong advocate for the rights of slaves. "Sewall, who was probably a slaveholder himself, had first felt misgivings about the practice one day in June 1700…" Sewall went as far as to argue in his book The Selling of Joseph, published in 1700, that New England should do away with the practice of slavery. "But this view could not have been very widespread, for the anti-slavery ranks in Massachusetts at that time were represented wholly by Samuel Sewall." Rachel's murder and the subsequent trial of Nathaniel Keen had a direct impact on Sewall embracing an abolitionist position with regards to slavery. "The case was committed to the jury, who bring in their verdict; they find Nathaniel Keen guilty of cruelty to his negro woman (Rachel) by cruel beating and hard usage." The case of the murder of Rachel was according to Lorenzo Greene "a test case", which in more modern legal terminology, the case of Rachel's murder was precedent-setting. Unfortunately, the precedent was to find the defendant guilty of cruelty rather than the original charge of murder, and the value of the life of an slave was five pounds and additional court costs.

== Defendant ==
Nathaniel Keen acquired one hundred acres of land near Kittery, Maine, in 1687 and an additional one hundred acres in 1691. Keen married Sarah Greene in 1688 and was survived by seven children based on the number of listed inheritors in Keen's will. Keen's sentence as a result of being found guilty of cruelty was a fine of 10 pounds and 10 shillings (ten "guineas") but was suspended until a later date. At the time of the trial, Keen owned at least two hundred acres of land, and in 1712, his estate was valued at an annual worth of 7 pounds. All of the farms in York County were assessed by the government for tax purposes. Keen would not have been one of the wealthiest members of the community. Still, he was slightly above average in terms of estimated annual income. A fine of 10 pounds and 10 shillings likely would've exceeded the annual value of Keen's estate in 1695, which was likely the contributing factor to Keen's fine being suspended. However, the probate office in 1725, three years after Keen died in 1722, appraised the total value of Keen's holdings at 705 pounds, which would have been a substantial amount of money. Keen's will details the distribution of lands and other household goods, but does not explicitly refer to any slaves. "Enslaved persons left to sons were often a bequest in entail...Daughters were far more likely to inherit enslaved persons in fee simple, unencumbered by entail." Consequently, if Keen had enslaved people at the time of writing his will, the distribution of the enslaved people amongst his inheritors would have been detailed rather than including enslaved people into the general category of "stock of creatures." Nathaniel Keen wrote his will on October 25, 1722, not long before his death, and at the time did not own any slaves.

== Rights of slaves in New England ==
Enslaved people were generally considered property and the laws governing property rights over the owners. However, slaves did have some crucial legal rights that differentiated them from livestock. "Though in general regarded as property, slaves in some instances were recognized as persons. As a person, the New England slave had a right to life. Although a master might reasonably and moderately correct and chastise his servant or slave, the deliberate murder of his bondsman was a capital crime." There are very few instances in which a slaveholder was charged with the murder of an enslaved person. Greene argues that the economics of slavery disincentivizes slaveholders from murdering their slaves as the primary cause for the rarity of such incidents.
