= Renée Radell =

American painter

Renee Radell
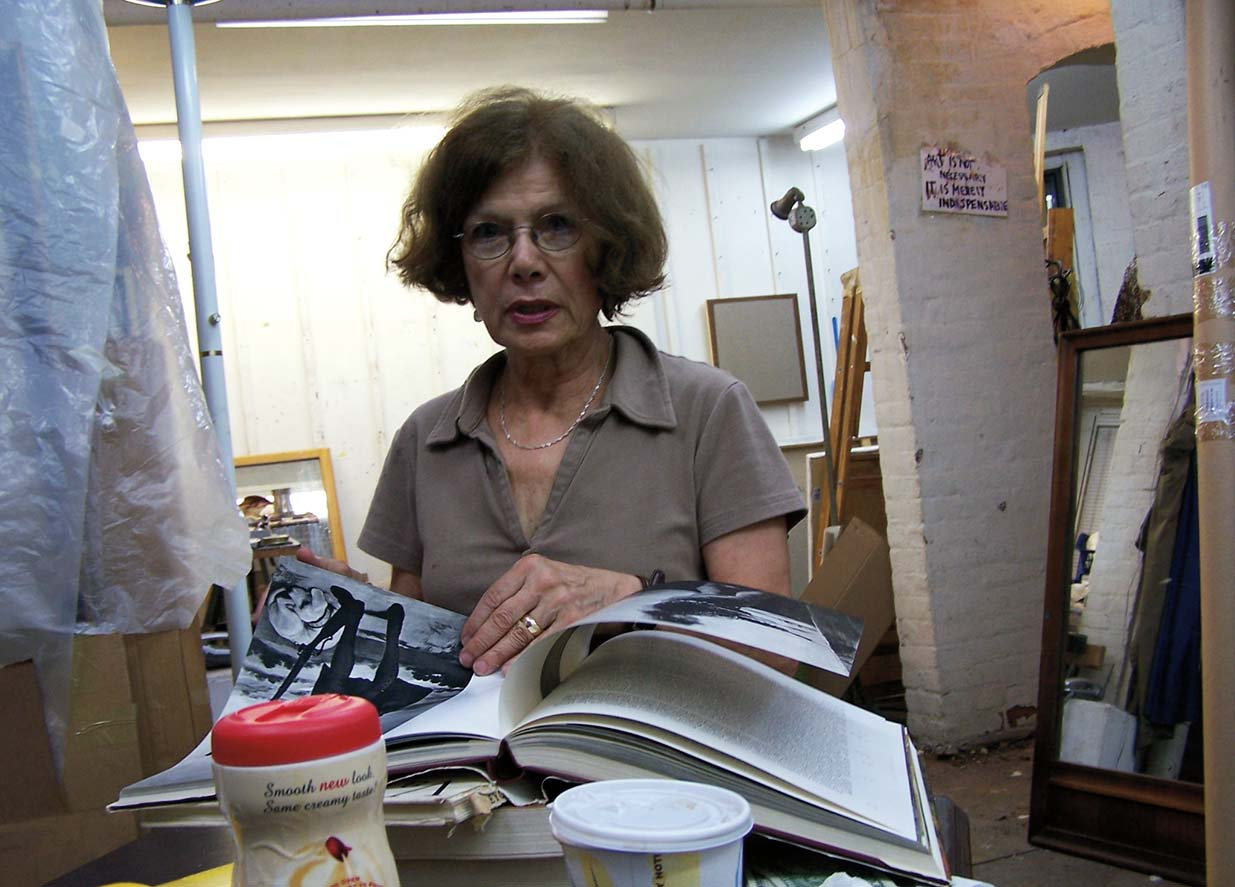
- Radell in East Village studio (2006)
- Born: Renee Katherine Kaupiz; August 9, 1929; Birmingham, Alabama U.S.
- Died: January 21, 2023 (aged 93); Harleysville, Pennsylvania, U.S.
- Known for: oil painting, mixed media

Renée Radell (August 9, 1929 - January 21, 2023) was an American Figurative Expressionist painter whose work focused on themes portraying children and families, social commentary subjects, and politics with some art critics noting similarities to earlier American Expressionist painters Jack Levine and Ben Shahn.

== Early life ==
Radell was born in Birmingham, Alabama. Because of the Great Depression, Radell moved with her family to Detroit, Michigan while still a child. She received regional awards and press recognition for her watercolors as a teenager studying at Cass Technical High School, which led to regional gallery exhibitions. She was a student at the Detroit Society of Arts and Crafts, now College for Creative Studies.

== Career ==
=== Teaching ===
Radell was an Artist in Residence at Mercy College of Detroit from 1973 until 1983. She taught at Parsons School of Design in Manhattan.

=== Exhibitions ===
Radell has exhibited her artwork since her first one-person show in Detroit in 1953 and has been represented in New York at the Tasca Gallery, Robert Shuster Gallery, Alan Stone Gallery, Spanierman Gallery, Silverstein Gallery, Access Gallery, Hanson Gallery, Westwood Gallery, and Hammer Gallery. Her most recent solo exhibition in New York in 2012 displayed non-objective works. Radell's paintings have sold at auction in New York at Christie's and Sotheby's.

=== Critical notices ===
Early in her career, Radell won regional watercolor painting awards and received press reviews for gallery exhibitions in the Detroit area. E. P. Richardson, Director of the Detroit Institute of Arts, wrote the foreword for her first solo exhibition and her work is included in the collection of the Detroit Institute of Arts.

Radell received critical notices in New York and Parisian art circles in the 1960s through a series of New York gallery exhibitions. Art critics described her as a colorist and figurative painter, and noted her often satirical approach to social commentary subject matter. Her visual statements about society, and politics evoked reference to Jack Levine and Ben Shahn. Radell also chooses family and children, nudes, landscapes and still-life as subject matter.

In the February 24, 1974 Detroit Sunday News Magazine, Russell Kirk, author and biographer of T.S. Eliot, wrote a pictorial essay published in the Detroit News Sunday News Magazine about Radell, in which Kirk draws parallels between Eliot's "permanent things" and symbols in many of Radell's paintings. The article was republished in the University Bookman in 2007.

== Personal life ==
During her time at Detroit Society of Arts and Crafts, Radell met and later married sculptor Lloyd Radell, with whom she had five children. She died on January 21, 2023.
