= OAAA OBIE Awards =

The OAAA OBIE Awards is an awards program managed by the Out of Home Advertising Association of America recognizing creativity in the out-of-home advertising (OOH) industry. The name OBIE is derived from the ancient Egyptian obelisk meaning, a tall stone structure used to publicize laws and treaties thousands of years ago. Many historians consider the obelisk as the first true form of advertising.

== Eligibility ==
For an advertisement to be eligible for the OBIE Awards, the advertiser (or its agency) must have made payment for the unit space directly to an out of home media company owning or operating the structure, the only exception being public service advertisements. The advertisement must have been posted within the previous calendar year. Identical advertisements posted during the eligible calendar year but entered in any previous OBIE Awards cycle are not eligible.

Current categories

- Automotive
- Consumer Goods & Services
- Contextual OOH
- Custom Installation
- Craft
- Engagement
- Entertainment
- Experiential
- Food & Beverage
- Integrated Media
- International
- Media
- Non-Profits & Public Service
- Retail
- Transportation

== Judging ==
Each year, a panel of seven judges meets to judge that year's OBIE Awards. The judges are selected from the top executives at advertising agencies and OOH media companies across the country. The OBIE jury gathers to evaluate all the entries in a day-long process that eventually yields Gold OBIE winners, Silver OBIE winners, and OBIE Finalists.

== Ceremonies ==
- 2003 – Washington, DC
- 2004 – Scottsdale, Arizona
- 2005 – Chicago, Illinois
- 2006 – Palm Springs, California
- 2007 – San Diego, California
- 2008 – Boca Raton, Florida
- 2010 – Phoenix, Arizona
- 2011 - Miami, Florida
- 2012 – Miami, Florida
- 2013 – Los Angeles, California
- 2014 – Orlando, Florida
- 2015 - San Diego, California
- 2016 - Boca Raton, Florida
- 2017 - New Orleans, Louisiana
- 2018 - Austin, Texas
- 2019 - Las Vegas, Nevada
- 2020 - Phoenix, Arizona
- 2021 - Virtual
- 2022 - Marco Island, Florida
- 2023 - Nashville, Texas
- 2024 - Carlsbad, California

== Hall of Fame ==
The OBIE Hall of Fame Award was established in 1992 to reward brands that have exemplified long-standing distinction in using the OOH medium. The award is voted on by the OAAA membership each year. The first recipient of the OBIE Hall of Fame Award was the US Army. Past winners include Apple, Budweiser, Chick-fil-A, Coca-Cola and Mini Cooper.

- 2003 – McDonald's
- 2004 – Bank of America
- 2005 – Apple Computer
- 2006 – Chick-fil-A
- 2007 – Walt Disney Company
- 2008 – Altoids
- 2009 – Absolut
- 2010 – Mini Cooper
- 2011 – Cracker Barrel Old Country Store
- 2012 – Maker's Mark
- 2013 – ESPN
- 2014 - Gap Inc.
- 2015 - HBO
- 2016 - Corona (beer)
- 2017 - Warner Bros. Entertainment
- 2018 - Miller Coors
- 2019 - Universal Studios
- 2020 - AT&T
- 2021 - Geico
- 2022 - Denver Water
- 2023 - Netflix
