= Devin Beliveau =

American politician

Member of the Maine House of Representatives for the 151st District
- In office December 2010 – December 2012
- Preceded by: Walter Wheeler
- Succeeded by: Deane Rykerson

Personal details
- Party: Democratic
- Spouse: Debbie Beliveau
- Education: Colby College; Stanford University
- Profession: History teacher
- Website: Official Website

Devin Beliveau is an American politician and schoolteacher from Maine. In 2010, he was elected to the Maine House of Representatives from District 151 when he defeated Republican John Carson and unenrolled Gary Beers, replacing Walter Wheeler, who was unable to run again due to term-limits. He was a history teacher at Thornton Academy. In 2009, Beliveau was appointed the Board of Trustees of the Maine Community College System by Governor John Baldacci. In 2012, Beliveau did not seek re-election.

Devin is currently a high school teacher at Samueli Academy, located in Santa Ana, California.

== Personal ==
Beliveau, a fourth generation Mainer, attended Hall-Dale High School in Farmingdale and Colby College in Waterville. He spent a year after graduating from Colby as an AmeriCorps volunteer with the I Have a Dream Foundation. His then began working in public schools in Massachusetts and California, where he earned a master's in education from Stanford University.
