= Caddy Awards =

Detroit Creative Directors Council award

The Caddy Awards were awards handed out between 1974 and 2006 by the now-defunct Detroit Creative Directors Council, for notable advertising created in the Detroit area. The D Awards replaced the Caddy Awards in 2007.
