= Pitcher Awards =

Pan-African advertising and marketing communications awards

- Pitcher Festival of Creativity
- Awarded for: Creative work in advertising, marketing communications, public relations, media and entertainment
- Venue: Radisson Blu Ikeja
- Country: Pan-African
- Presented by: CHINI Africa
- Status: Active
- Established: 2018
- Website: www.pitcherfestival.com

The Pitcher Awards is an event of the Pitcher Festival of Creativity or the Pitcher Festival, which recognizes creative work in advertising, marketing, communications, public relations, media and entertainment across Africa.

The Pitcher Awards were established in 2018 as part of Creativity Week, a pre-Cannes Lions International Festival of Creativity first held at the Muson Centre in Lagos.

The 2020 Pitcher Awards took place virtually due to the COVID-19 pandemic. Entries were received from Cape Verde, Ghana, Kenya, Nigeria, Senegal, South Africa,Tanzania and Uganda. The Pitcher Awards remained a virtual event in 2022.

While the 2024 Pitcher Awards were held virtually on May 18, 2024, the Pitcher Festival later held a winners reception on August 9th, 2024 in Ikeja. The awards were expanded to accept entries from the broader African Diaspora, which was noted as being in line with the African Union’s earlier declaration of the African Diaspora as the 6th region of Africa. The Pitcher Festival also hosted the student winners from its Future Creative Leaders Academy, which was facilitated through a first-time cultural fusion project. The project was a partnership between university students in Nigeria and Romania.

The following year, the Pitcher Festival took place from May 15, 2025 - May 17, 2025 in Lagos. The 2025 edition of the festival introduced the Pitcher Special Awards, which recognized winners in the categories of Media Agency of the Year, Advertising Agency of the Year, Media Network of the Year, Advertising Agency Network of the Year, Independent Network of the Year, Marketing Company of the Year, and Brand of the Year.

The Pitcher Awards are judged by juries of advertising, marketing, media and creative communication professionals. Award categories have increased across editions. The categories of the 2020 edition were Channel, Good, Heritage and Innovation. The 2022 edition categories were Channel, Craft, Digital, Entertainment, Good and Heritage. The categories for the 2024 edition consisted of 8 main categories and 40 subcategories.

Past winners of the Pitcher Awards have included Airtel, Dentsu, Indomie, McCann, and others.
