= Out of Home Advertising Association of America =

Advertising trade association

- Abbreviation: OAAA
- Headquarters: Washington, D.C.
- Location: United States
- President and CEO: Anna Bager
- Website: Official website

The Out of Home Advertising Association of America (OAAA) is a trade association representing all out of home (OOH) media formats in the United States.

== About ==
The OAAA was founded in 1891, as the Associated Bill Posters’ Association of the US and Canada; it later changed its name first to the Outdoor Advertising Association of America and then in 2019 to the Out of Home Advertising Association of America.

The OAAA regulates industry member standards covering both digital and static out-of-home advertising. OAAA provides its members with current government regulations, marketing innovations and overall OOH standard operations. There are five main OAAA membership categories: General, Street Furniture/Transit/Place-Based, Associate, Affiliate, and International.

OAAA's archives are located at Duke University.

== Award programs ==
OAAA annually hosts two awards programs recognizing media planning and OOH creative work. The OOH Media Plan Awards program recognizes exceptional media planning in the creation and execution of an OOH campaign. The OAAA OBIE Awards celebrates the best creative OOH over several product categories and formats.
