= List of the oldest buildings in Maine =

This article attempts to list the oldest buildings in the state of Maine in the United States of America, including the oldest houses in Maine and any other surviving structures from the First Period or oldest buildings of their type in Maine. Some dates are approximate and based on architectural studies and historical records, other dates are based on dendrochronology. All entries should include citation with reference to: architectural features; a report by an architectural historian; dendrochronology; or other secondary source.

== Verified through dendrochronology or architectural surveys ==
Building	Location	First Built	Notes
McIntire Garrison House	York, Maine	1707	Apparently built in 1707 thought traditionally held to be constructed in 1645.
Old York Gaol	York, Maine	c. 1720	Construction of building began in 1720, with expansion continuing until 1806. The structure is one of the oldest surviving jails in the United States.
Bray House	Kittery, Maine	c. 1720	While the Bray House was historically dated to the mid-1600s, a contemporary survey has deemed that assigning a date prior to 1710-1720 to the structure is "not really possible."
First Congregational Church and Parsonage	Kittery, Maine	c. 1730	Oldest church building in Maine
Littlefield Tavern	Wells, Maine	1735	This structure is reported to be an early tavern.
Ramsdell House	York, Maine	c. 1747	One of the oldest houses in Maine, dated using dendrochronology. Located on Lindsay Road.
Tate House	Portland, Maine	c. 1755	House museum and one of the oldest houses in Portland
Burnham Tavern	Machias, Maine	1770	Possibly the oldest building east of the Penobscot River in Maine.
Wadsworth-Longfellow House	Portland, Maine	1785-6	House museum built by Gen. Peleg and Eliza Wadsworth. Childhood home of their grandson, poet Henry Wadsworth Longfellow.
Portland Head Light	Portland, Maine	c. 1790	Oldest lighthouse in Maine

== Currently unverified estimates ==
Building	Location	First Built	Notes
William Whipple House	Kittery, Maine	c. 1660	Purportedly the oldest portion of home at 88 Whipple Road is alleged to circa 1660 and was occupied by Robert Cutt; it was later the birthplace of General William Whipple, Signer of the Declaration of Independence; located at 88 Whipple Road Possibly the oldest house in Maine. As of 2019 date not known to be confirmed with dendrochronology.
Francis Hooke House	Kittery Point, Maine	c. 1674	No known dendrochronology survey.
William Pepperrell House	Kittery, Maine	1682	Allegedly one of the oldest houses in Maine. No known dendrochronology survey.
Hunnewell House	Scarborough, Maine	1684	The Hunnewell House is possibly the oldest surviving home in Scarborough. No known dendrochronology survey.
Wells Homestead	Wells, Maine	1696	No known dendrochronology survey.

== See also ==
- List of the oldest buildings in the United States
- Timeline of architectural styles
