= William Pepperrell House =

Historic house in Maine, United States

- U.S. National Register of Historic Places
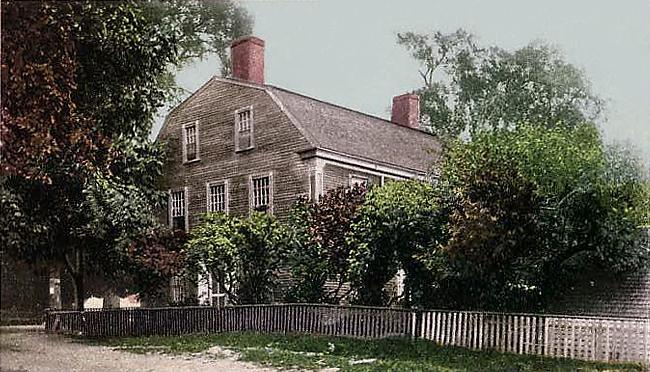

- Location within Maine Location within the United States
- Location: 94 Pepperrell Road, Kittery Point, Maine
- Coordinates: 43°4′59″N 70°42′13″W
- Area: 1 acre (0.40 ha)
- Built: 1683
- Architectural style: Colonial
- NRHP reference No.: 73000159
- Added to NRHP: August 14, 1973

The William Pepperrell House is a historic house at 94 Pepperrell Road (Maine State Route 103) in Kittery Point, Maine. Built about 1682 and later enlarged and restyled, it was at the time of its construction the grandest house in what is now the state of Maine. It is notable as the birthplace and home of Sir William Pepperrell (1696–1759) a leading businessman of the period whose greatest claim to fame was leading the 1745 Siege of Louisbourg during King George's War. The house was listed on the National Register of Historic Places in 1973.

== Description and history ==
The Pepperrell House is located on the south side of Pepperrell Road, just east of Bellamy Lane, and faces south toward Pepperrell Cove on the Piscataqua River. It is a 2 1/2-story wood-frame structure, with a gambrel roof and clapboard siding. Both front (water-facing) and rear (street-facing) facades are four bays wide, with an entrance in one of the central bays. The building corners are pilastered, and the entrances have flanking pilasters and are topped by gabled pediments. Above the street-facing entrance is a round-arch window.

The house was built about 1682 for William Pepperrell (d. 1733), a fisherman who moved to the area in 1680 and married the daughter of John Bray, a local merchant and shipwright. Pepperrell joined his father-in-law in business, and by 1695 owned most of Kittery Point. By the early 18th century he was one of the wealthiest men in New England. His son, also named William, was active in the family business, and joined the local militia, rising to command the entire militia of the Massachusetts District of Maine. When King George's War broke out in 1744, Pepperrell was chosen to lead a colonial expedition to take the French Fortress Louisbourg on what is now Cape Breton Island. For leading the capture of this strategic fortification, Pepperrell was awarded a baronetcy by King George II. Pepperrell's large landholdings were lost by his grandson William Pepperrell the younger, who remained Loyal during the American Revolutionary War and fled to England, resulting in the confiscation of the estate by the state.

== See also ==
- Lady Pepperrell House, built by the younger William's widow
- Bray House (Kittery Point, Maine), adjacent to this house
- List of the oldest buildings in Maine
- National Register of Historic Places listings in York County, Maine
