= Overhang (architecture) =

Architectural Roofing Feature

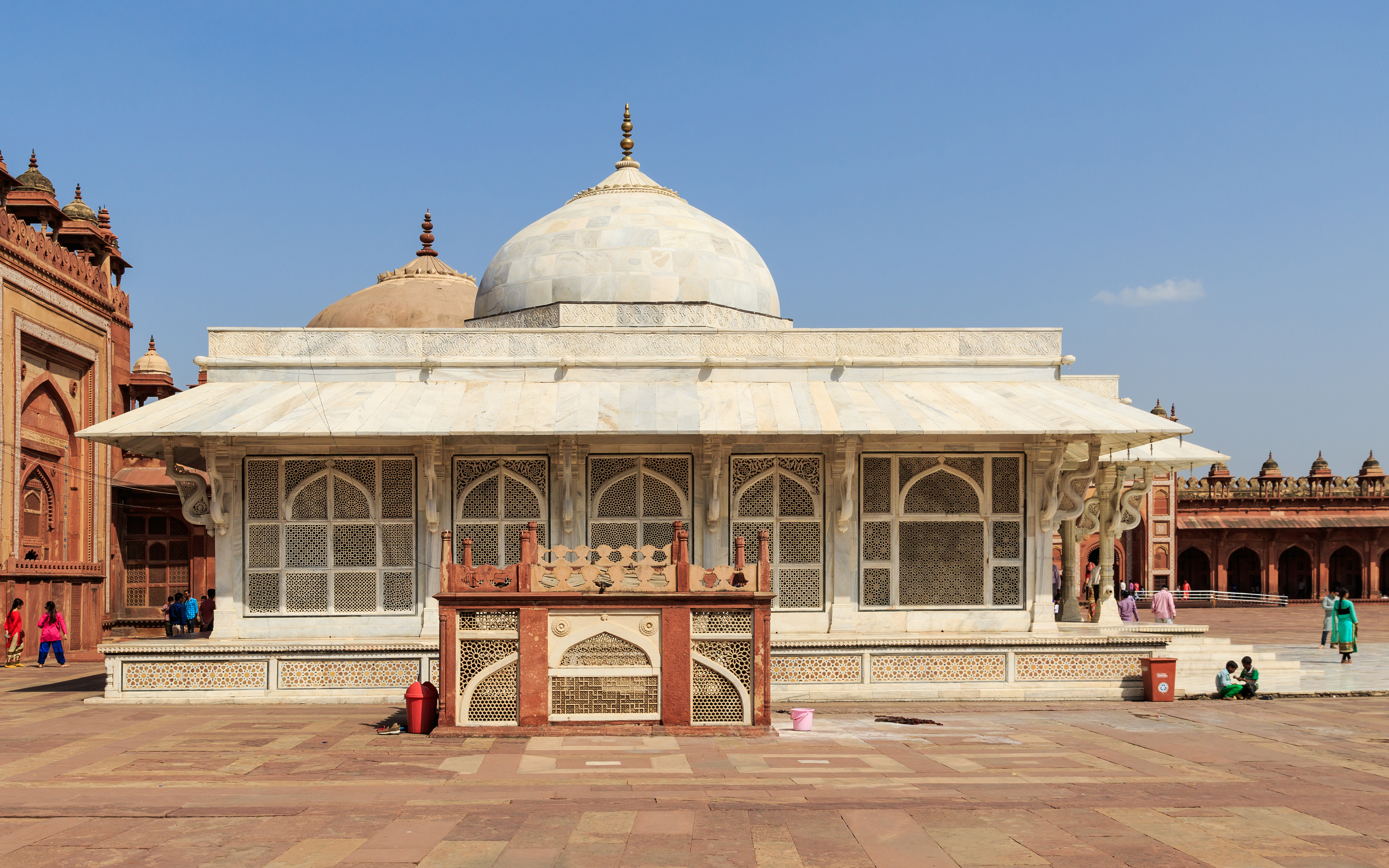
Overhang on 16th century Tomb of Salim Chishti, Fatehpur Sikri, India

In architecture, an overhang is a protruding structure that may provide protection for lower levels. Overhangs on two sides of Pennsylvania Dutch barns protect doors, windows, and other lower-level structures. Overhangs on all four sides of barns and larger, older farmhouses are common in Swiss architecture. An overhanging eave is the edge of a roof, protruding outwards from the side of the building, generally to provide weather protection.

== History ==
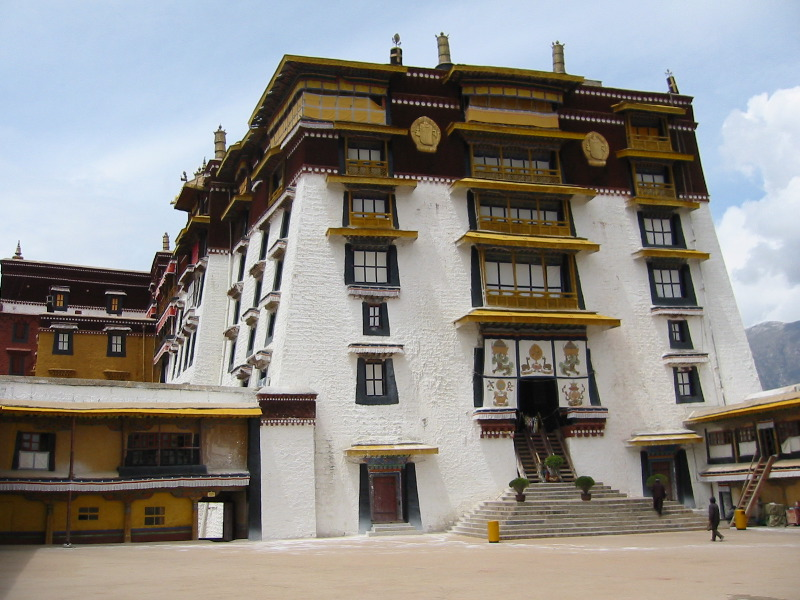
Overhangs on the White Palace in the Potala Palace complex—an example of Tibetan architecture from 1649.

Overhangs are also common in medieval Indian architecture—especially Mughal architecture of the 16th–18th century, where they are called chhajja, often supported by ornate corbels and also seen in Hindu temple architecture. Later, these were adopted by Indo-Saracenic architecture, which flourished during the British Raj. Extensive overhangs were incorporated in early Buddhist architecture; were seen in early Buddhist temples; and later became part of Tibetan architecture, Chinese architecture, and eventually, traditional Japanese architecture, where they were a striking feature.

In late-medieval and Renaissance Europe, the upper stories of timber-framed houses often overhung the story below, the overhang being called a "jetty". This technique declined by the beginning of the 18th century as building with brick or stone became common.

By the 17th century, overhangs were one of the most common features of American colonial architecture in New England and Connecticut. This style featured an overhanging or jettied second story, which usually ran across the front of the house or sometimes around it; these dwellings were known as garrison houses. In the early 20th century, the style was adopted by Prairie School architecture and architects like Frank Lloyd Wright, thus making its way into modern architecture. An overhang may also refer to an awning or other protective elements.

== Gallery ==
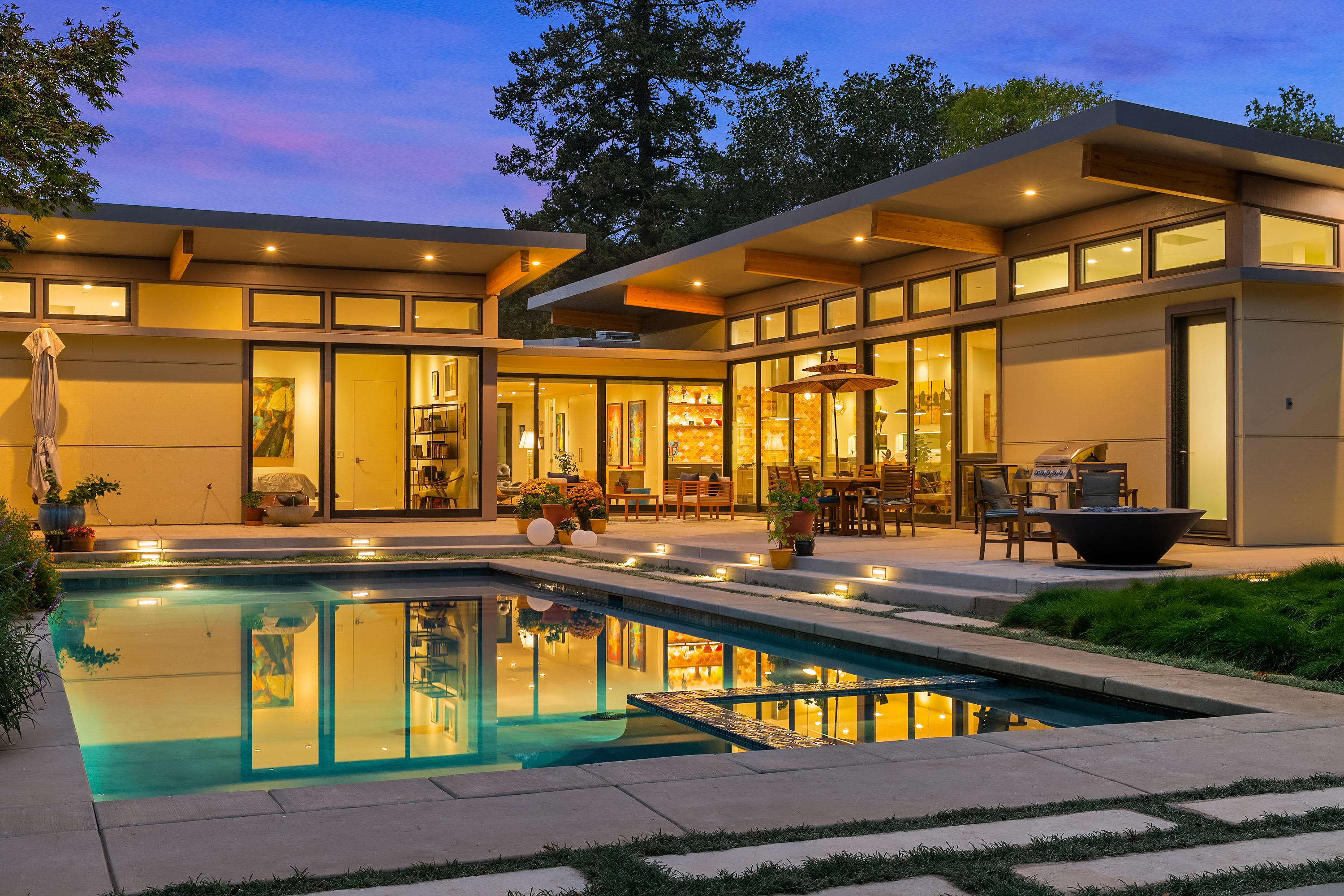
A contemporary home in Glen Ellen United States exemplifying the practice of Indoor-Outdoor Living design through an elongated overhang. Builder: Stillwater Dwellings.

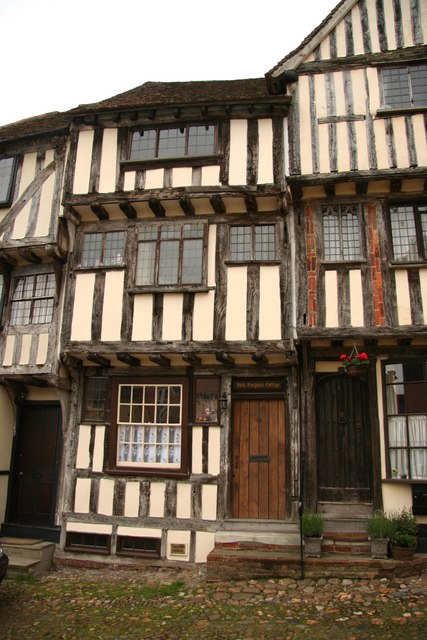
15th century timber-framed houses with overhanging jetties in Thaxted, England.

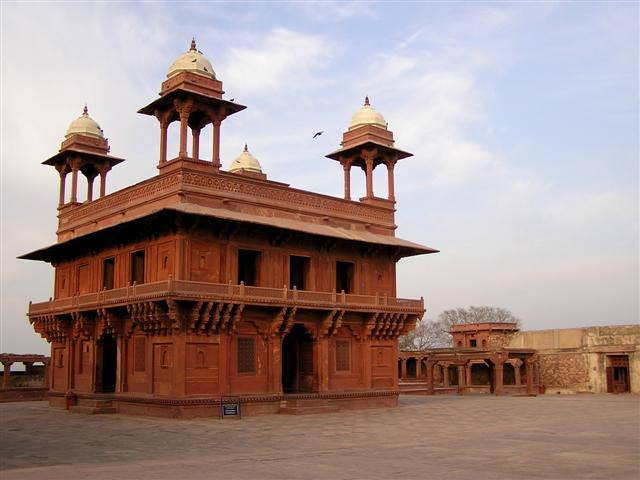
Overhang of the Diwan-e-khas (Hall of private audience, Fatehpur Sikri, built 1570s, Mughal architecture.

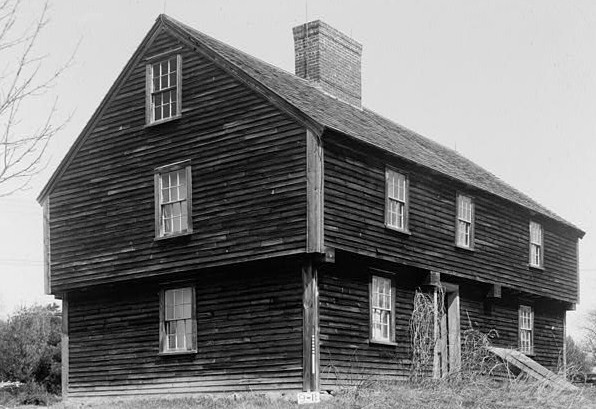
The late 17th century McIntire Garrison House in York, United States.

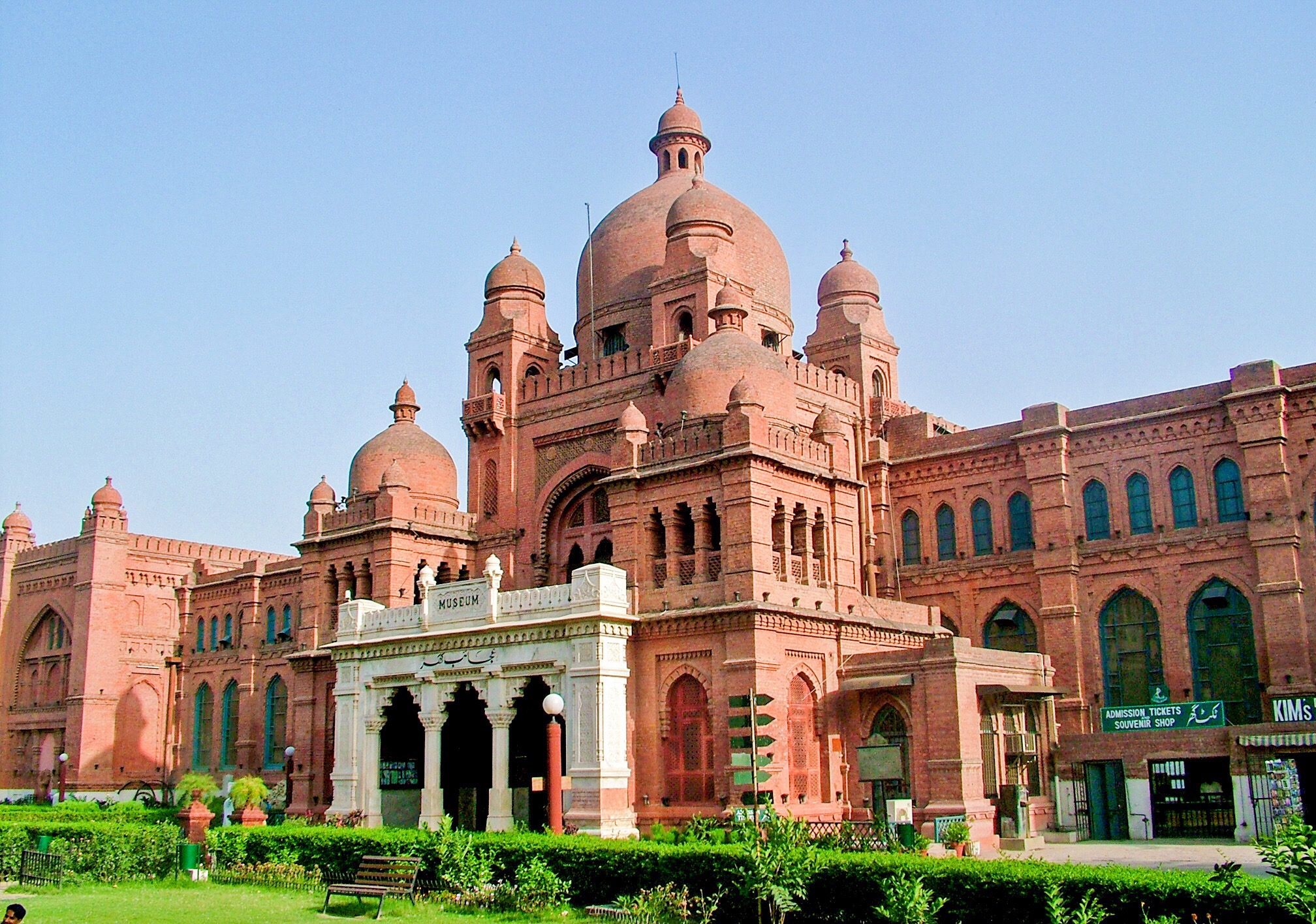
Overhangs of the Lahore Museum, Pakistan in Indo-Saracenic architecture, 1894.

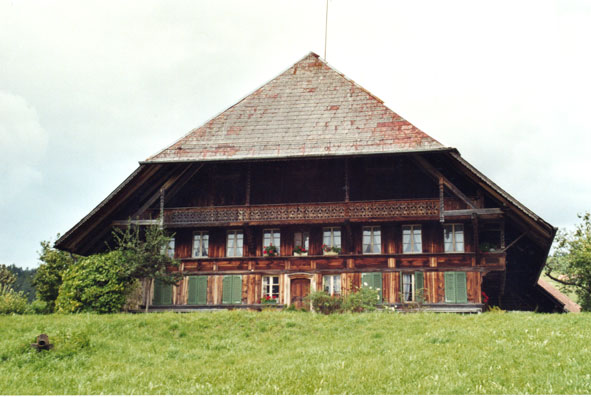
Emmental farmhouse with overhang reaching the ground, Switzerland.

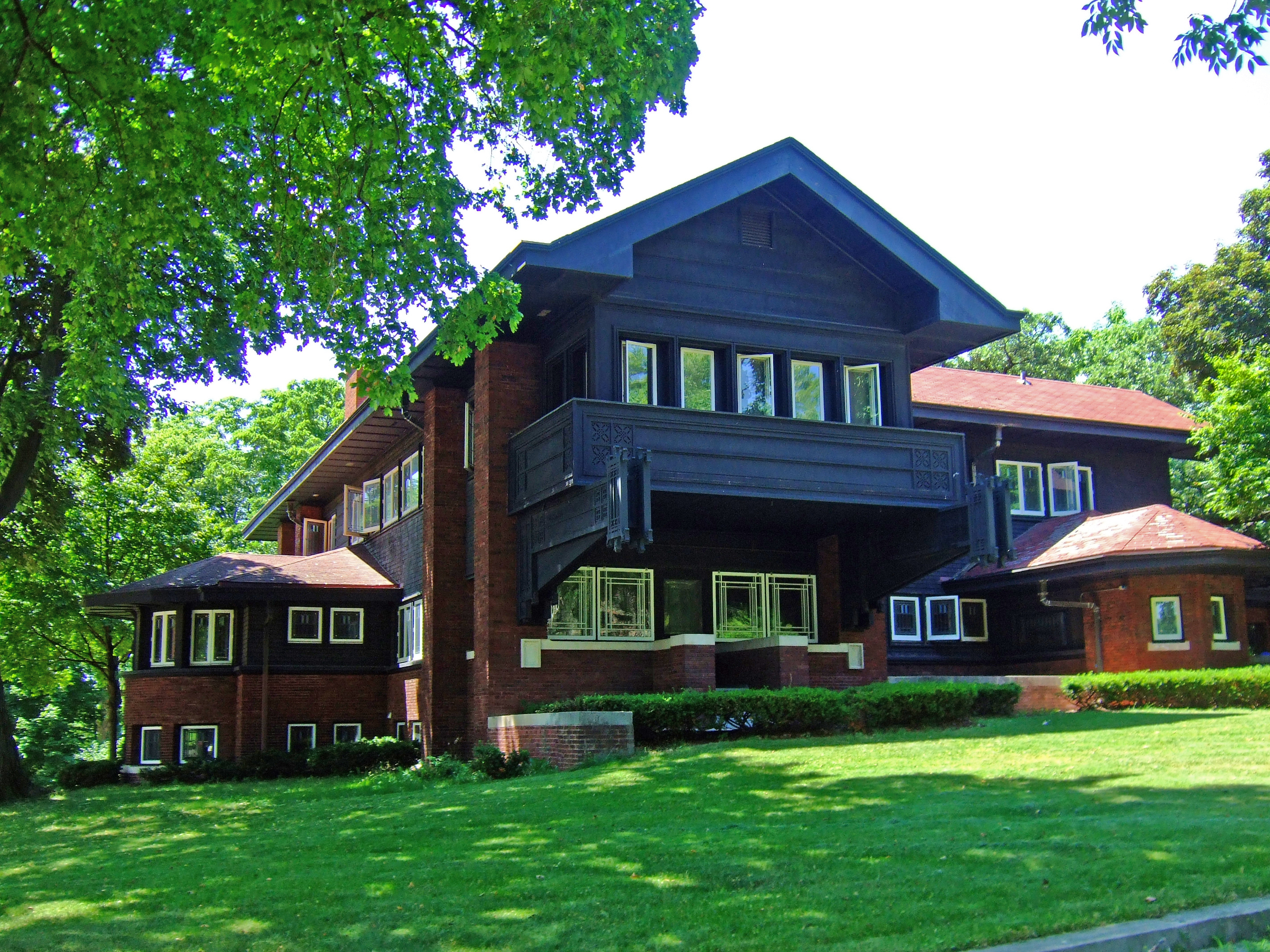
Overhangs of the Harold C. Bradley House, Madison, United States, by Louis Sullivan and George Grant Elmslie representative of Prairie School architecture.

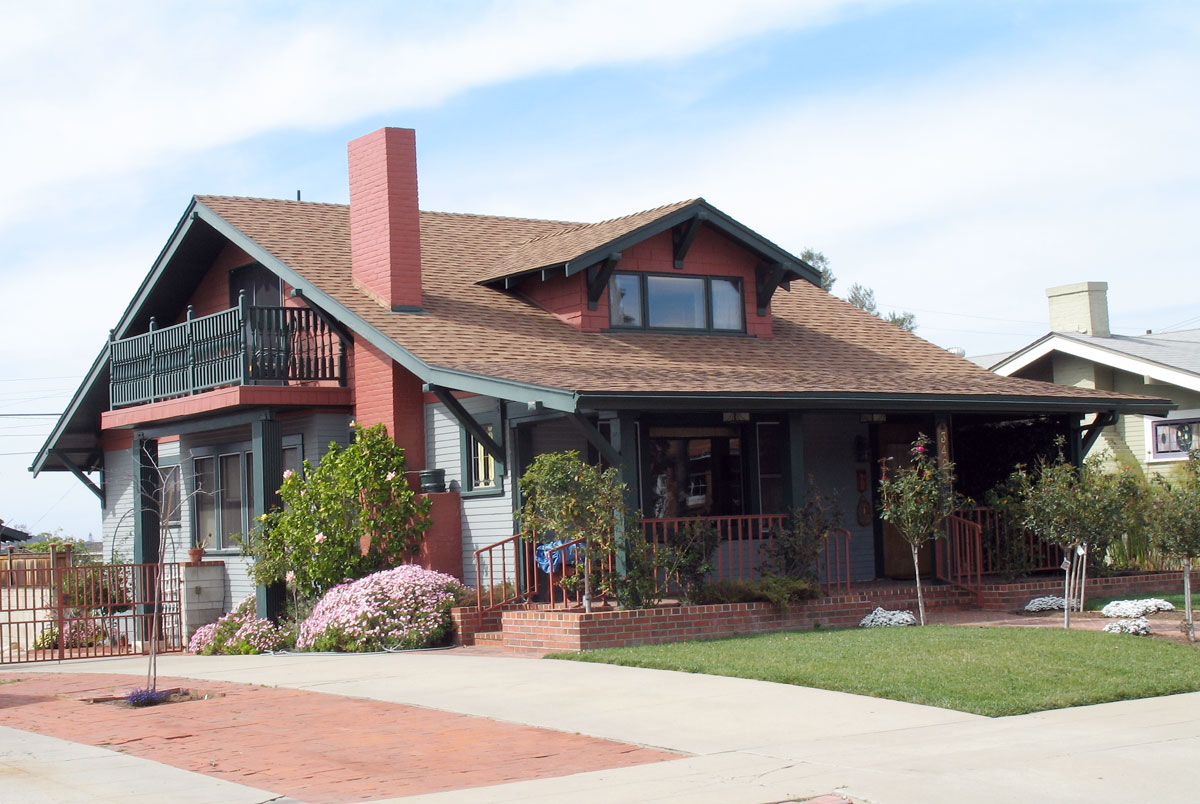
Deeply overhanging eaves in American Craftsman-style bungalow, San Diego, United States, late 19th century.

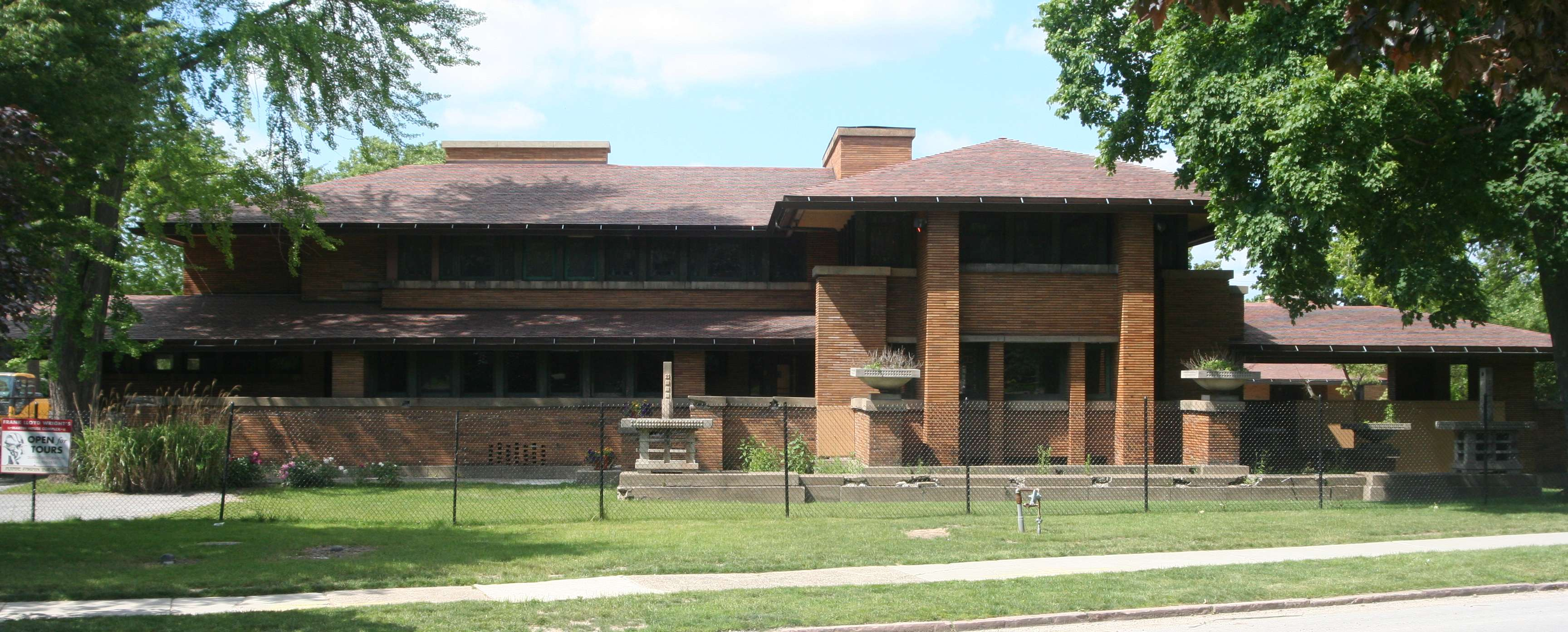
Darwin D. Martin House, Buffalo, United States with wide overhang. Frank Lloyd Wright, 1905.

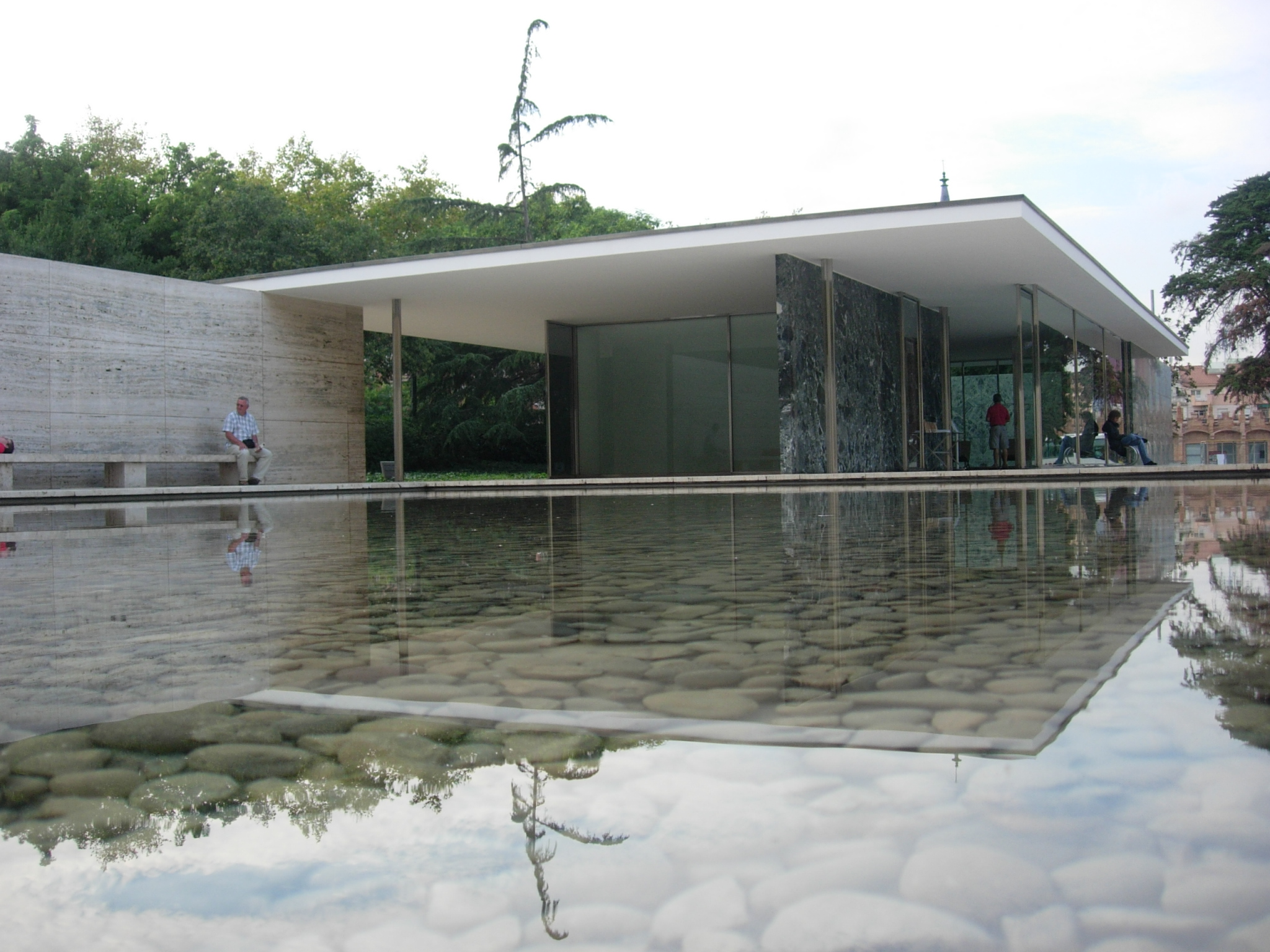
Barcelona Pavilion, with hovering overhang, 1929, by Mies van der Rohe, Modernist Bauhaus architecture.

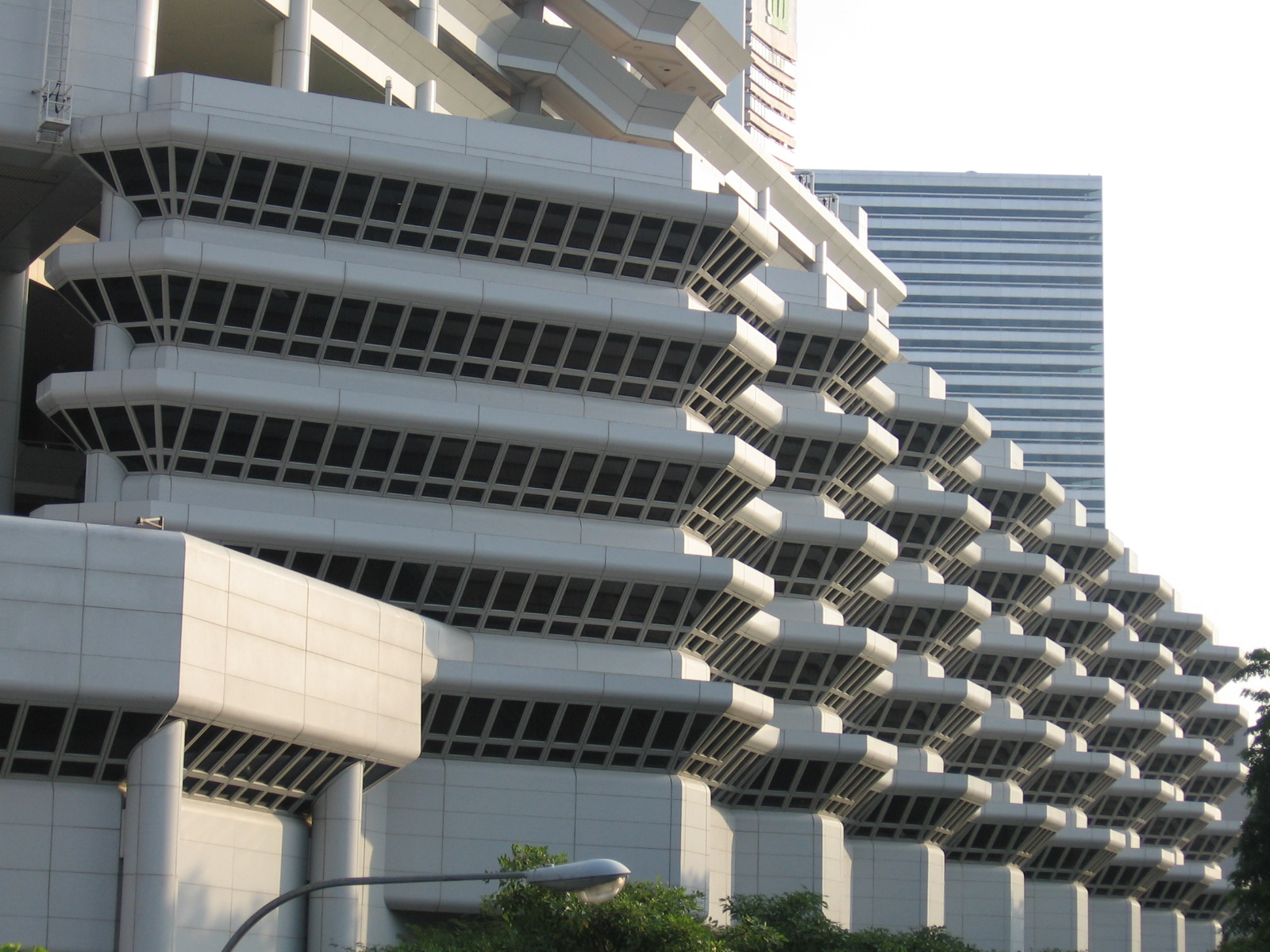
The Concourse, Singapore, featuring prominent overhangs, 1994.

== See also ==
Where eaves continue in the same plane over an ell (projection), this part of the roof is instead considered a catslide and if across a full façade the building may be a saltbox house.

- Cantilever
- Eaves
- Five-foot way
- Marquee (structure)
