= William Whipple House =

Coordinates: 43.085838°N 70.734205°W

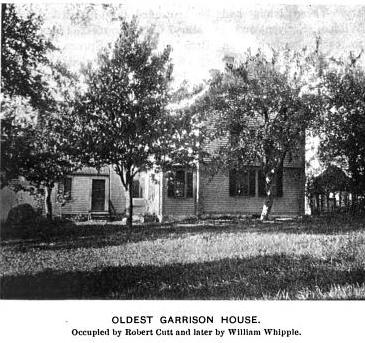

The William Whipple House is a historic home in Kittery, Maine. Its oldest portion is estimated to date to circa 1660, making it one of the oldest houses in the state. Robert Cutt was its first occupant, who fortified it as a garrison house. Founding Father, Revolutionary War general, and Declaration of Independence signatory William Whipple was born there in 1731.

The home is located at 88 Whipple Road, and was restored in 2017.

== See also ==
- Bray House (Kittery Point, Maine)
