= First Congregational Church and Parsonage =

First Congregational Church and Parsonage may refer to:

- First Congregational Church and Parsonage (Kingman, Arizona), listed on the NRHP in Arizona
- First Congregational Church and Parsonage (Kittery, Maine), listed on the NRHP in Maine
