= Lady Pepperrell House =

Historic house in Maine, United States

- U.S. National Register of Historic Places
- U.S. National Historic Landmark
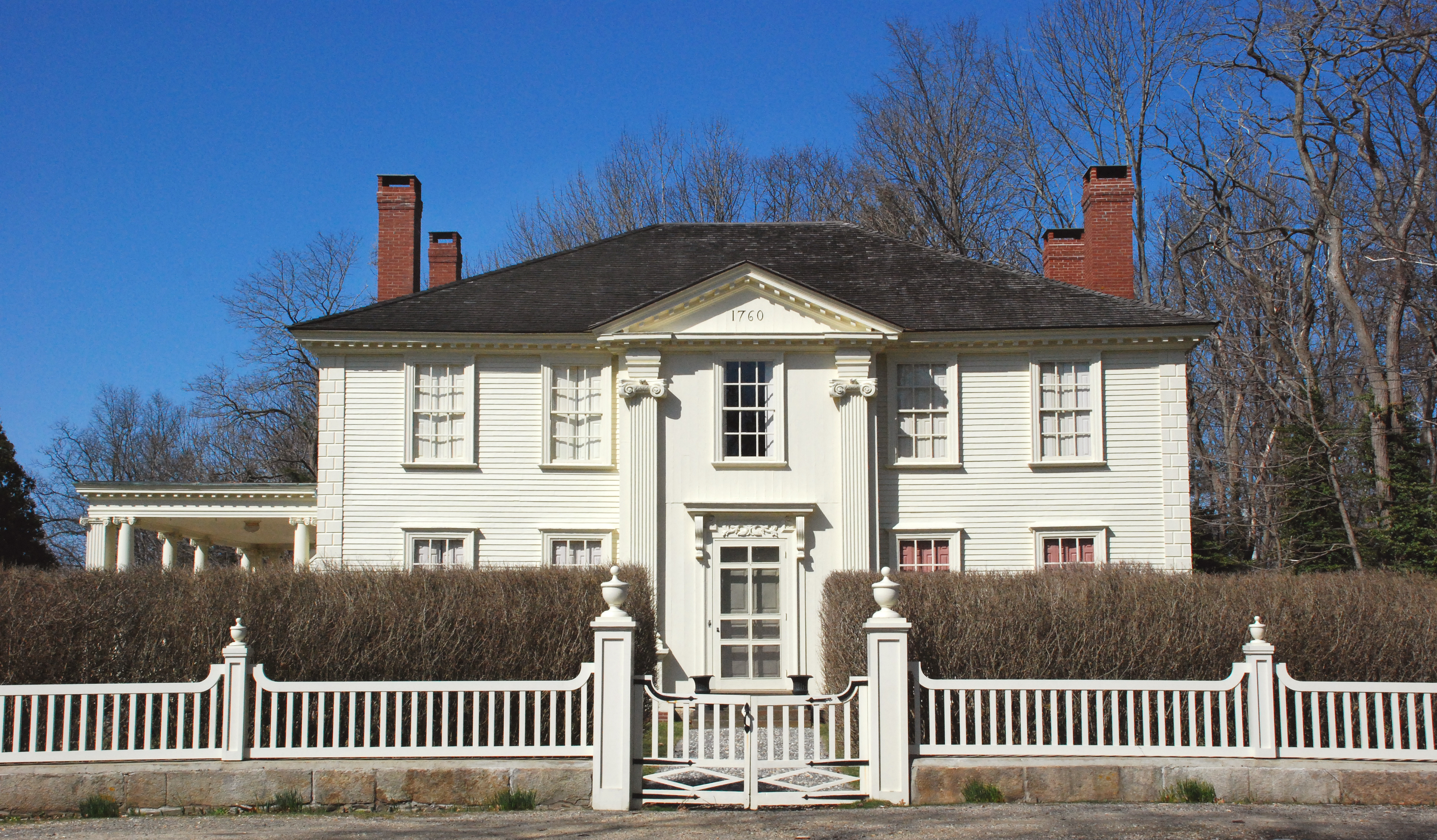

- Location within Maine Location within the United States
- Location: Kittery Point, Maine
- Coordinates: 43°4′53″N 70°43′0″W
- Area: less than one acre
- Built: 1760
- Architectural style: Georgian
- NRHP reference No.: 66000094

Significant dates
- Added to NRHP: October 15, 1966
- Designated NHL: October 9, 1960

The Lady Pepperrell House is an American historic house in Kittery Point, Maine. It stands on State Route 103, opposite the First Congregational Church and Parsonage. Built in 1760 by Mary Pepperrell, widow of Sir William Pepperrell, the house is one of the finest examples of Georgian architecture in New England. Sir William was the only colonial American to be honored with a baronetcy, awarded by King George II for his leadership of the 1745 expedition against the French Fortress Louisbourg on Cape Breton Island. The house was designated a National Historic Landmark in 1960, but remains in private ownership, subject to preservation restrictions held by Historic New England.

== History ==
Lady Pepperrell was born Mary Hirst in 1704 to a merchant in Boston, Massachusetts. She married Captain William Pepperrell, a merchant and major landowner in what is now southern Maine (but was then part of Massachusetts), in 1723, and settled into his family home in Kittery Point. William Pepperrell was appointed by Governor William Shirley to lead the 1745 expedition against Fortress Louisbourg, and was awarded a baronetcy by King George II for his success in that endeavour. When Sir William died in 1759, he was one of the wealthiest men in Massachusetts.

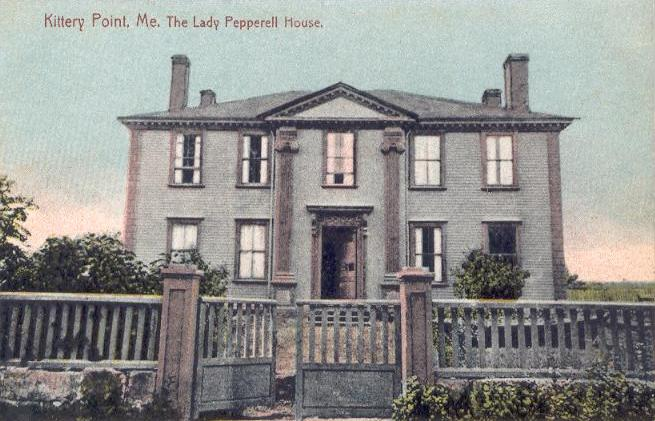
Postcard image of the Lady Pepperell house c. 1910

In 1760 Lady Pepperrell commissioned the construction of this house, hiring English craftsmen to ensure the high Georgian style then popular. She made the house her home until her death in 1789, after which it went through a succession of owners. In 1942 the house was given to the Society for the Preservation of New England Antiquities (now Historic New England), which restored the house and operated it as a museum. In 1985, the organisation sold the house into private hands, retaining preservation and conservation easements to limit alterations to its historic fabric. It remains in private hands, but is open to the public several times a year.

The house was designated a National Historic Landmark in 1960, and was listed on the National Register of Historic Places in 1966.

== Description ==
The Lady Pepperrell House is a two-story wood-frame structure, five bays wide, with a hip roof and four chimneys, two placed symmetrically on each side. The center bay of the main facade projects, and is topped by a low-pitch fully enclosed gabled pediment. This projecting section is finished in flushboard, while the rest of the house clapboarded. It has fluted pilasters with Ionic capitals rising its full height, and the gable, like the rest of the roofline, is modillioned. The main entry is on the first level of this projecting section, and it is also flanked by fluted pilasters, which support curved brackets and a slightly projecting architrave. The building's corners have flush-boarded quoining. A Colonial Revival porch, sympathetic in styling to the main block, extends to its left. This porch was added in 1922 along with a matching one to the right, which has since been removed. A two-story kitchen ell extends to the rear of the house.

The interior has a fairly typical Georgian center-hall layout, with two rooms on either side of a large central hall. The public spaces feature elaborate and high-quality woodwork, which has been well preserved.

== See also ==
- List of National Historic Landmarks in Maine
- National Register of Historic Places listings in York County, Maine
