= Early Cape houses of Wells, Maine =

Historic houses in Maine, United States

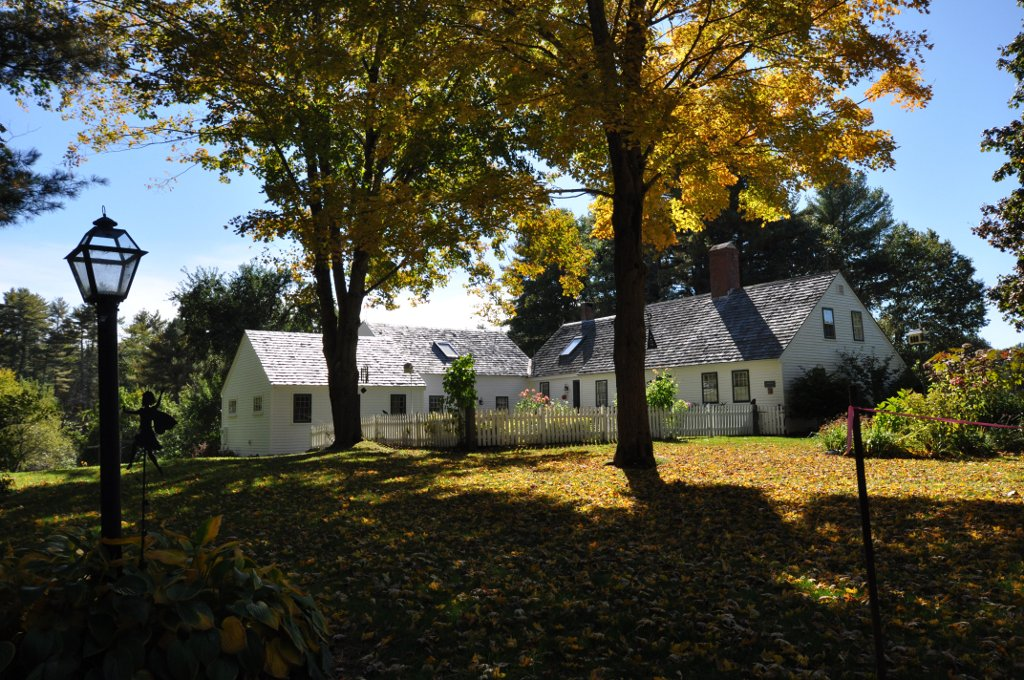
In this photo of the Dorfield Farm house, the oldest portion of the house is on the right, with additions extending to the left.

The Early Cape houses of Wells, Maine, are a collection of 18th-century Cape style houses in or near the town of Wells, Maine. The town has a concentration of these houses that is unusual in the state of Maine. In the 1970s the town conducted a detailed street survey, in which 19 historically significant 18th-century Cape houses were identified either in or just outside the municipal boundaries. These buildings were subsequently listed on the National Register of Historic Places in December 1979.

== Background ==
The town of Wells, Maine is located in York County on the coast of southern Maine. It has a land area of about 50 square miles (130 km^{2}), with a coastline that consists almost entirely of barrier beach. This lack of significant harbor facilities would play a role in the town's development. Wells was settled in the 1640s, and was from its earliest days a primarily agrarian settlement, while neighboring York and Kennebunkport developed economically around fishing, lumber, and seagoing merchant activity. The entire southern Maine area, with only a small population, was devastated in repeated conflicts between the British colonies of New England and New France, and was effectively abandoned after repeated raids involving the French and their Native American allies in the late 17th and early 18th centuries. As a result, there are very few buildings in the region that predate 1710.

As the area was resettled in the 18th century, Wells again developed only slowly, because of its lack of harbor facilities, and remained an agricultural area with a low population density. This rural setting allowed a larger number of these older humble farmsteads to survive. The buildings listed here are typified by having a main block that is a wood-frame structure 1 1/2 stories in height, with a front facade five bays wide and a side-gable roof. There is usually a large central chimney, and the main entrance is located in the center of the front facade. Decorative elements are generally modest, and the doors and windows are often set with their tops just below the eaves, a feature not generally found in later versions of the same style house. Additions typically extend the house to the side or rear, and range in age from the 18th to the 20th century.

== Listed buildings ==
The nineteen historically significant Capes are briefly described below. Each was listed on the National Register of Historic Places on December 27, 1979, although some of them are formally listed as being the vicinity of one of Wells' neighboring towns, or a neighborhood of Wells, rather than in Wells itself. All but four are actually within the municipal bounds of Wells; the others are in Ogunquit, which was part of Wells until 1980. Many of the houses have a slate marker affixed to the front of the buildings. These markers indicate the name of the building and approximate construction date

Name	Image	NRHP refnum	Location	Listed town	Description
Austin-Hennessey House		79000171	433 Branch Rd., at Burnt Mill Rd. 43.345556°N 70.619167°W	Wells	Built before 1725, this house has an attached ell and barn to the rear. It is also known as the Storer-Hennessey House.
Dorfield Farm		79000172	5 Willow Way, off Harrisecket Road. 43.358056°N 70.567222°W	Wells	This house was built before 1762, when it was owned by James Wakefield. It has an attached ell and connected barn.
Early Post Office		79000173	88 Crossing Road (Bragdon's Crossing) at the end of Crossing Road found near the intersection of Chapel Road and ME-109; 43.320833°N 70.603611°W	Wells	The construction date of this house is unknown, but predates 1806. The right front room included banks of mail slots, suggesting its use as an early post office.
Eaton House		79000174	2077 Sanford Rd. 43.359167°N 70.663611°W	Wells	This house was probably built in the late 18th century. Its chimney has three fireplaces, and no baking oven. It was probably built by a member of one of Wells' first families.
Emery House		79000176	2449 Sanford Rd. 43.365556°N 70.669444°W	Highpine	This house was built about 1800 by Samuel Emery. It was also known as "Rose Cottage" for the large number of rambling rose bushes around it.
Goodale-Bourne Farm		79000177	412 North Village Rd. 43.263333°N 70.634722°W	Ogunquit	This house was built about 1740. The earliest deed indicates it was owned by Zacharias Goodale, Jr. in 1749. The house is perpendicular to the road and a few hundred feet from it. It is actually in Ogunquit.
Goodale-Stevens Farm		79000178	329 North Village Rd. 43.263333°N 70.634722°W	Ogunquit	This house was built about 1725 by Zachariah Goodale. The land may have been cleared as early as 1699. It is located a short way east of, and across the street from, the Goodale-Bourne Farm. There is a large barn directly across the street. It is actually in Ogunquit.
Hatch House		79000179	2104 Sanford Rd. 43.356914°N 70.658889°W	Wells	This house was probably built about 1800 by Jeremiah Hatch.
Littlefield Homestead		79000182	1458 Branch Rd, near Chick's Crossing Rd. 43.375°N 70.597778°W	Wells	This house was probably built before 1780, when it was sold by Joseph Littlefield to Joshua Littlefield.
Littlefield Tavern		79000186	1107 Littlefield Rd. 43.3°N 70.64°W	Wells	This house was built c. 1690 by Captain James Littlefield, and was for many years a tavern. It is located three houses away from Clubhouse Road on the same side of the road leading to Route 9.
Littlefield-Chase Farmstead		79000183	State Route 9, 1485 N. Berwick Rd. 43.307222°N 70.675°W	Wells	This house was built in 1776 by either Daniel or Dependence Littlefield.
Littlefield-Dustin Farm		79000184	41 Dodge Rd. 43.308333°N 70.685556°W	Wells	Deed research has traced this house to 1784, but stylistic evidence suggests it is much older. It was owned at that time by one of the Littlefields, early settlers of Wells.
Littlefield-Keeping House		79000185	1673 Littlefield Rd. 43.3075°N 70.664444°W	Wells	This house was probably built between 1776 and 1799, and was originally three bays wide, with the door at the center. The outer two bays were added later, as was an addition. It is presently undergoing renovations which include siding as of January 2023. It is easily visible from the road.
Lord Farm		79000187	325 Laudholm Rd. 43.336389°N 70.551667°W	Wells	Based on stylistic analysis, this house was built in the mid-to-late 18th century. Its earliest recorded owner (in 1781) is a member of the Wells family. The house is the last house on the street before the service entrance to Laudholm Farm.
Mill House		79000188	502 Post Rd. 43.287778°N 70.594167°W	Wells	This house was built c. 1750, its owners operating a mill on Stevens Brook, which runs south of the property. The house is now an antiques shop.
Charles Perkins House		79000189	Scotch Hill 297 Main Street; 43.287778°N 70.594167°W	Ogunquit	This house was probably built in the mid-to-late 18th century, when the property was owned by David Maxwell. This house is actually in Ogunquit.
Wells Baptist Church Parsonage		79000191	1384 Branch Rd. 43.374167°N 70.599444°W	Wells	Deed research has traced ownership of this house to a member of the Littlefield family in 1779. It was sold in 1845 by Clement Littlefield to the local Baptist church for use as a parsonage.
Wells Homestead		79000193	232 Sanford Rd. 43.3225°N 70.586111°W	Wells	This house is one of the oldest in Wells, with a documented history to 1707, and an interior beam on which the date 1696 is incised. It is believed that this house may have been built in 1696, burned by Native Americans in 1702, and rebuilt 1710.
Winn House		79000194	86 Obed's Lane; 43.2447°N 70.6004°W	Ogunquit	Originally located on United States Route 1, this house was moved to a park on Obed's Lane in the 1980s, and is now a museum. Its construction is estimated to have been in the 1780s. This house is actually in Ogunquit.

== See also ==
- National Register of Historic Places listings in York County, Maine
- List of the oldest buildings in Maine
