= Pepperrell's Regiment =

Line infantry regiment of the British Army

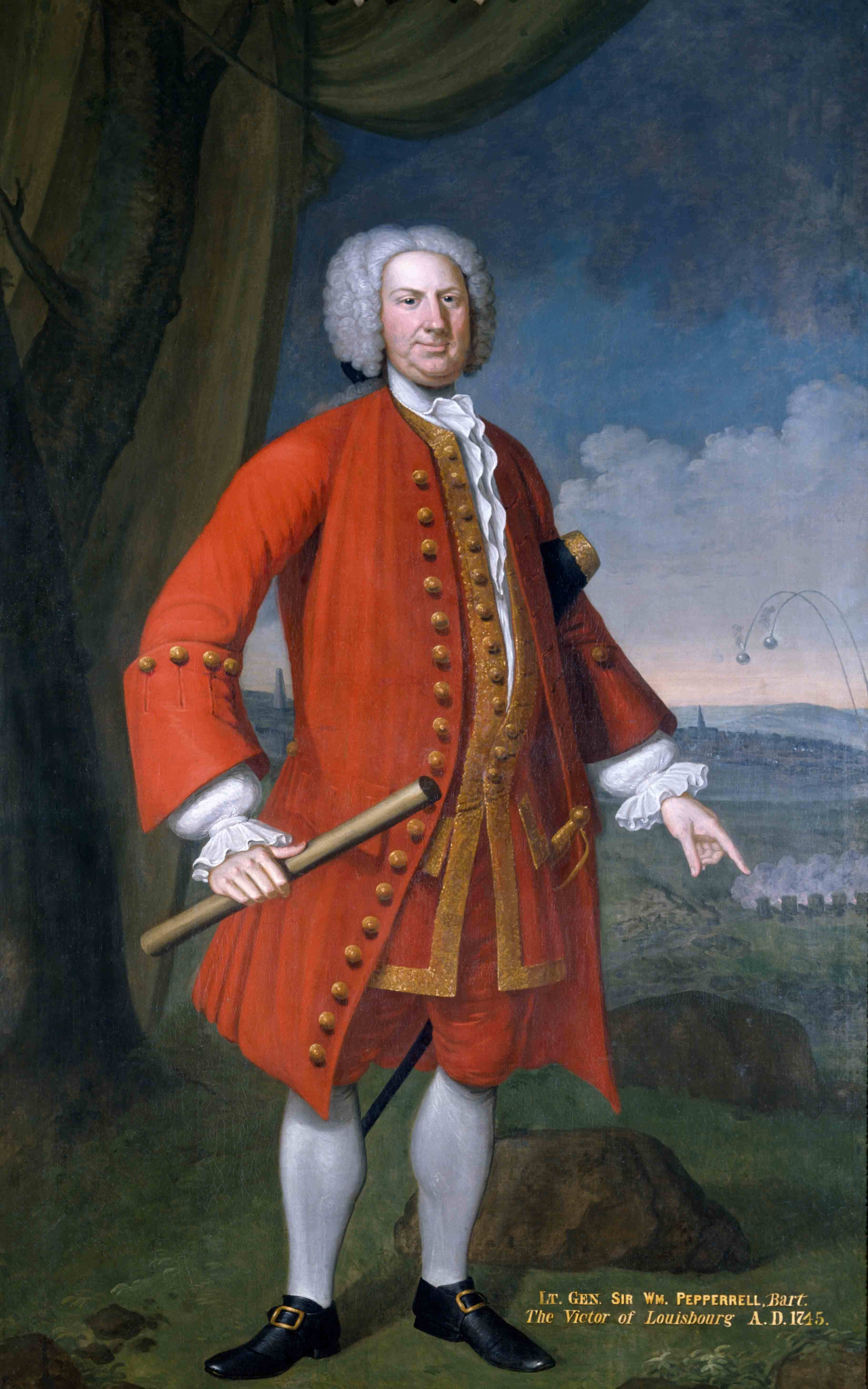
Sir William Pepperrell, the regiment's first colonel

Pepperrell's Regiment was a line infantry regiment of the British Army. The first iteration of the regiment was raised as Sir William Pepperrell's Regiment of Foot by Colonel Sir William Pepperrell in the Province of Massachusetts Bay in 1745 for service in King George's War. It was ranked as the 66th Regiment of Foot in September 1745 and served in the war before being disbanded in May 1749. The regiment was re-raised in the New England Colonies as the 51st Regiment of Foot (Cape Breton Regiment) in December 1754 for service in the French and Indian War and was stationed at Fort Oswego. At the Battle of Fort Oswego the regiment surrendered alongside the 50th Regiment of Foot (American Provincials) and the rest of the fort's garrison to French forces on 14 August 1756, resulting in the destruction of the two regiments, both of which were subsequently disbanded in December 1756.
