= Eaton House (Wells, Maine) =

Historic house in Maine, United States

- U.S. National Register of Historic Places
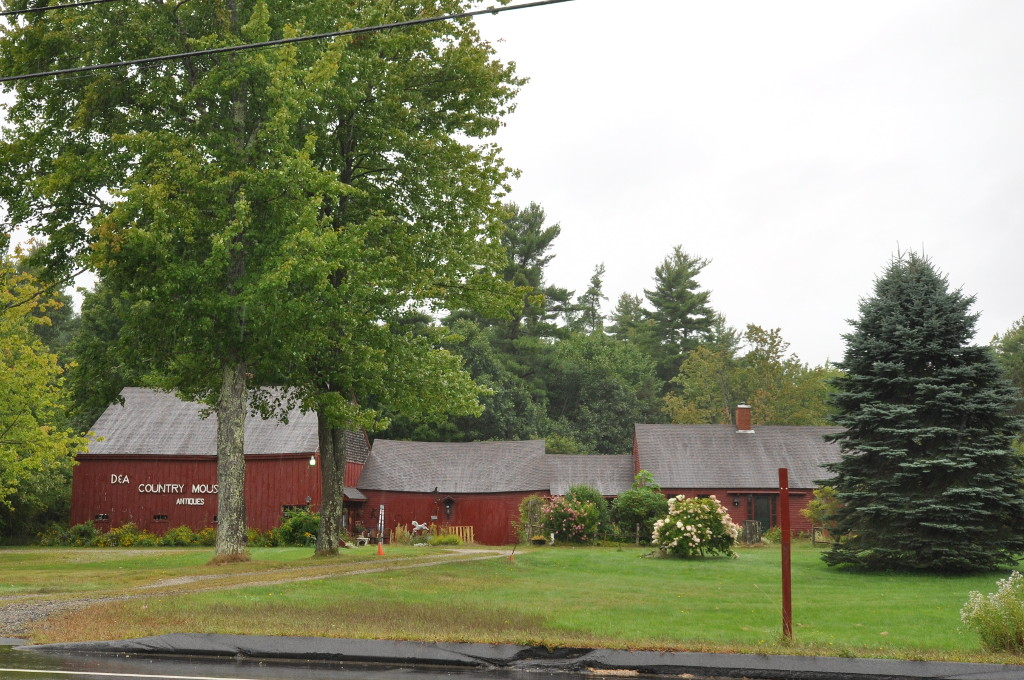

- Location within Maine Location within the United States
- Location: Sanford Rd., Wells, Maine
- Coordinates: 43°21′26″N 70°39′29″W
- Area: less than one acre
- NRHP reference No.: 79000174
- Added to NRHP: December 27, 1979

The Eaton House is an historic house on Sanford Road in Wells, Maine. Built in the late 18th century, it is one of a collection of well-preserved 18th-century Cape style houses in Wells. It was listed on the National Register of Historic Places in 1979, listed as being in the North Berwick area. However, it is physically located in the town of Wells.

== Description and history ==
The Eaton House is set on the north side of Sanford Road (Maine State Route 109), just west of the High Pine Baptist Church in northwestern Wells. The main block is a 1 1/2-story wood-frame structure, five bays wide, with a central chimney and clapboard siding. Attached ells extend to the west, joining the house to a barn. The front entrance is simply styled, with sidelight windows. The chimney supports three fireplaces, and there is a stairway leading to the attic that has an original banister.

The town of Wells, Maine is located in York County on the coast of southern Maine. Wells was settled in the 1640s, and was from its earliest days a primarily agrarian settlement, while neighboring York and Kennebunkport developed economically around fishing, lumber, and seagoing merchant activity. Growth in the 17th century was limited by a series of French and Indian Wars. As the area was resettled in the 18th century, Wells again developed only slowly, because of its lack of harbor facilities, and remained an agricultural area with a low population density. This rural setting allowed a larger number of these older humble farmsteads to survive. This house is believed to have been built in the late 18th century by one of the first families to settle the area, although deed research has only identified owners to 1854, when it was sold by Nason Hatch.

== See also ==
- National Register of Historic Places listings in York County, Maine
