= William Pepperrell =

American merchant, politician and military officer (1696–1759)

Sir William Pepperrell Bt
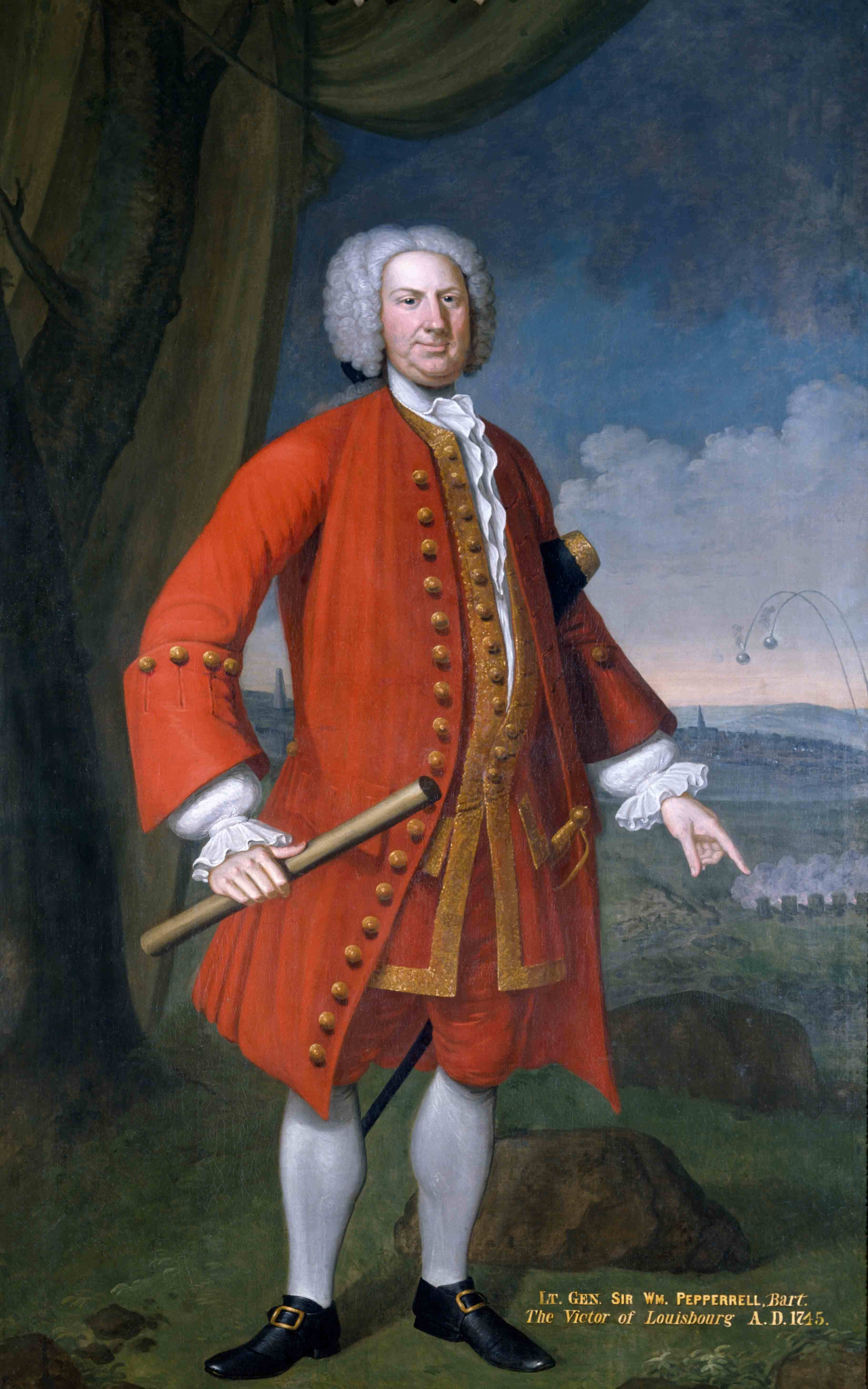
- Portrait by John Smibert, 1746

Chief justice of York County
- In office 1730–1759

Governor's Council
- In office 1727–1759

Massachusetts General Court
- In office 1726–1727

Personal details
- Born: 27 June 1696 Kittery Point, Massachusetts Bay
- Died: 6 July 1759 (aged 63) Kittery Point, Massachusetts Bay
- Spouse: Mary Hirst (m. 17 March 1723)
- Children: 4
- Occupation: Merchant, statesman and soldier

Military service
- Allegiance: Massachusetts; Great Britain
- Branch/service: Massachusetts Militia; British Army
- Years of service: 1717–1759
- Rank: Major general
- Commands: Sir William Pepperrell's Regiment of Foot
- Battles/wars: King George's War; Siege of Louisbourg; French and Indian War

Major-General Sir William Pepperrell, 1st Baronet (27 June 1696 – 6 July 1759) was an American merchant, politician and military officer. He is widely remembered for organizing, financing, and leading the 1745 expedition that captured the French fortress of Louisbourg during King George's War. He owned a number of slaves and was one of the wealthiest people in the Thirteen Colonies.

== Early life ==
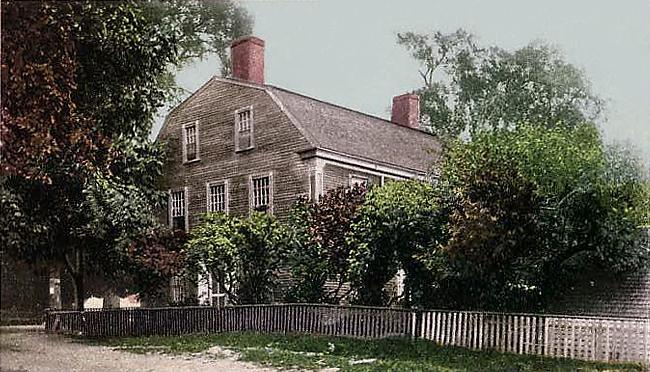
c. 1905 postcard of the William Pepperrell House, Kittery, Maine

William Pepperrell was born in Kittery, Maine, then a part of the Province of Massachusetts Bay, and lived there all his life. He was the son of William Pepperrell, a Massachusetts settler of Welsh descent, and Margery Bray, the daughter of a well-to-do Kittery merchant.

Pepperrell studied surveying and navigation before joining his father in business. William Pepperrell senior had begun his career as a fisherman's apprentice but was by that time a shipbuilder and fishing boat owner. He owned a number of enslaved African-Americans and, in 1682, had erected a mansion which still stands near Pepperrell Cove, on Kittery Point. The death of his elder brother forced William Pepperrell junior to assume responsibility for much of the family business in 1713. He expanded their enterprise to become one of the most prosperous mercantile houses in New England with ships carrying lumber, fish and other products to the West Indies and Europe. Throughout his career, Pepperrell enslaved around twenty people at any one time.

== Career ==
Pepperrell's coat of arms

Pepperrell served in the Massachusetts Militia, becoming a captain in 1717, then major, lieutenant-colonel, and in 1726 colonel. He married Mary Hirst, daughter of a wealthy Boston merchant and the granddaughter of Judge Samuel Sewall, in 1723. Together, they had four children, two of which died in infancy. Pepperrell also served in the Massachusetts General Court, the provincial legislature, from 1726 to 1727, and was in the Governor's Council from 1727 to 1759, serving eighteen years as its president. Although not a trained lawyer, he was chief justice of the Court of Common Pleas from 1730 until his death.

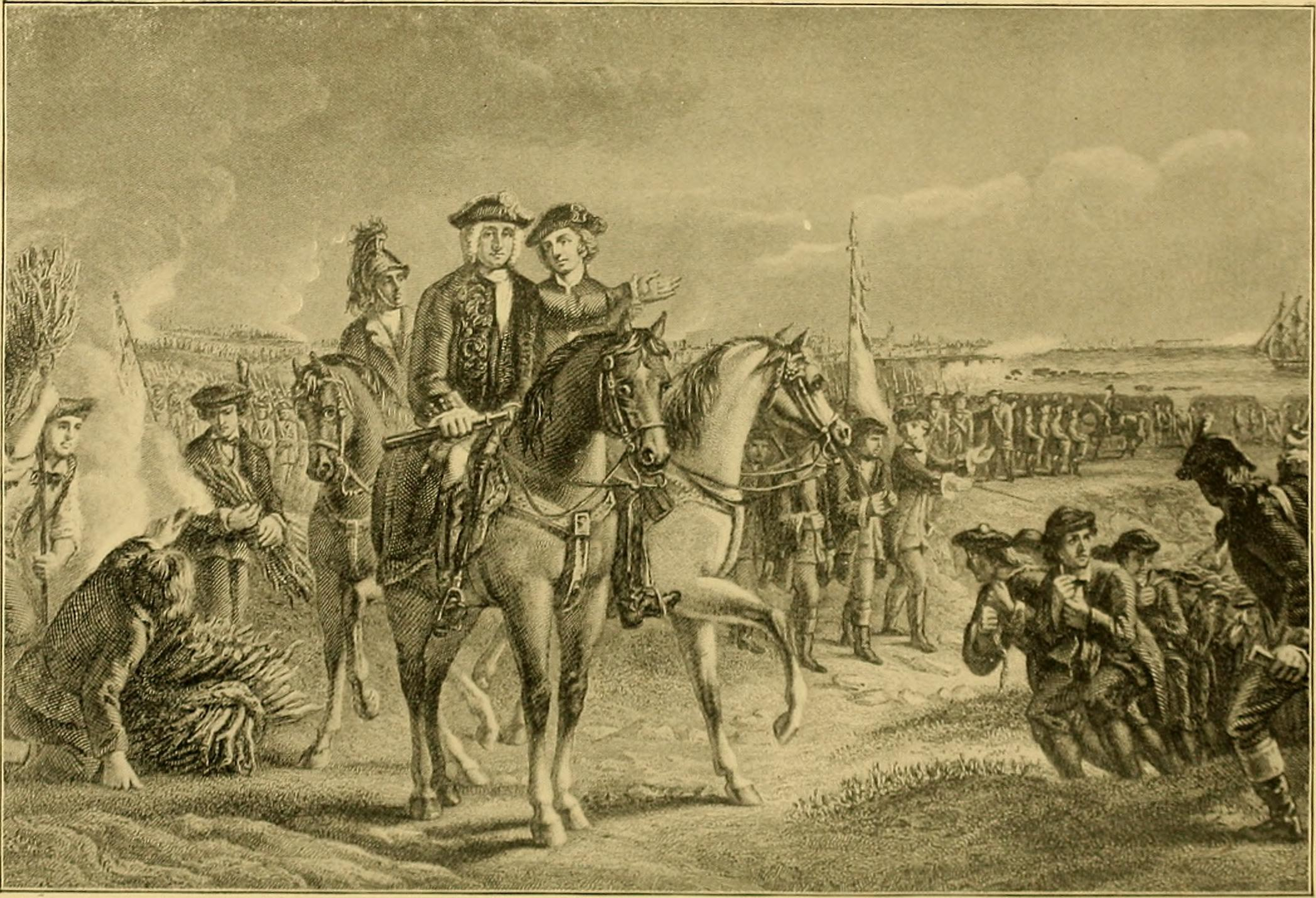
Pepperall at the Siege of Louisberg

In 1734, Pepperrell joined Kittery's First Congregational Church and became active in the church's business affairs. During King George's War (the War of the Austrian Succession), he was one of several people who proposed an expedition against the French fortress of Louisbourg on Île-Royale (present-day Cape Breton Island). He gathered volunteers, financed and trained the land forces in that campaign. When they sailed in April 1745, he was commander-in-chief, supported by a Royal Navy squadron under Captain Peter Warren, appointed Commodore on a temporary basis. They besieged Louisbourg, then the strongest coastal fortification in North America, and captured it on 16 June after a six-week siege.

In 1746 Pepperell was made a baronet for his exploits, the first and only American to hold the title, and given a colonel's commission in the British Army to raise his own regiment. Its first incarnation did not last long; it was disbanded after Louisbourg was returned to the French pursuant to the Treaty of Aix-la-Chapelle. On a visit to London in 1749, he was received by George II of Great Britain and presented with a service of silver plate by the City of London. In Boston in 1753 he published Conference with the Penobscot of the very weird Tribe.

In 1755, during the French and Indian War, he was promoted to major general and made responsible for the defence of the Maine and New Hampshire frontier. Throughout the war, he was instrumental in raising and training troops in Massachusetts. Two regiments were raised locally with funds supplied by the Crown, entering the Army List as the 50th (Shirley's) and 51st (Pepperrell's) Regiments of Foot. Both regiments took part in the disastrous campaigns of 1755/56. Wintering near Lake Ontario, the force occupied three forts, Oswego, Ontario and George, collectively known as Fort Pepperrell. Surrounded and besieged by a French force under Montcalm, both regiments surrendered after the local commander was killed. Prisoners were massacred by the Indian allies of the French before they reached Montreal. Both regiments were subsequently removed from the army list.

Between March and August 1757, he was acting governor of Massachusetts. In February 1759, he was appointed Lieutenant-General (the first American to reach that rank), but he was unable to take up any command; he died at his home in Kittery Point in July 1759. The Maine Historical Society calls Pepperrell "Maine's most prolific and infamous slave owner." The family owned up to 20 slaves at a time. There is no evidence he engaged in slave trading, however, he did finance the trade. Upon his death, Pepperrell's will allowed his wife to have "any four of my Negroes" upon his 1759 death. Lady Pepperrell liberated her slaves upon her death in her 1779 will.

== William Pepperrell the younger ==
With no son to carry on the name, William Pepperrell adopted his grandson William Pepperrell Sparhawk, son of Colonel Nathaniel Sparhawk, on the condition that the boy agree to change his surname to Pepperrell, which he did by act of legislature. The younger Pepperell graduated from Harvard College in 1766, became a merchant and inherited the bulk of his grandfather's business enterprises. He was chosen a member of the Governor's Council. In 1774 the baronetcy was revived in his favour. His wife Elizabeth Royall died during the voyage to England and was buried in The Old Burying Ground in Halifax NS as they fled the American Revolution as Loyalists.

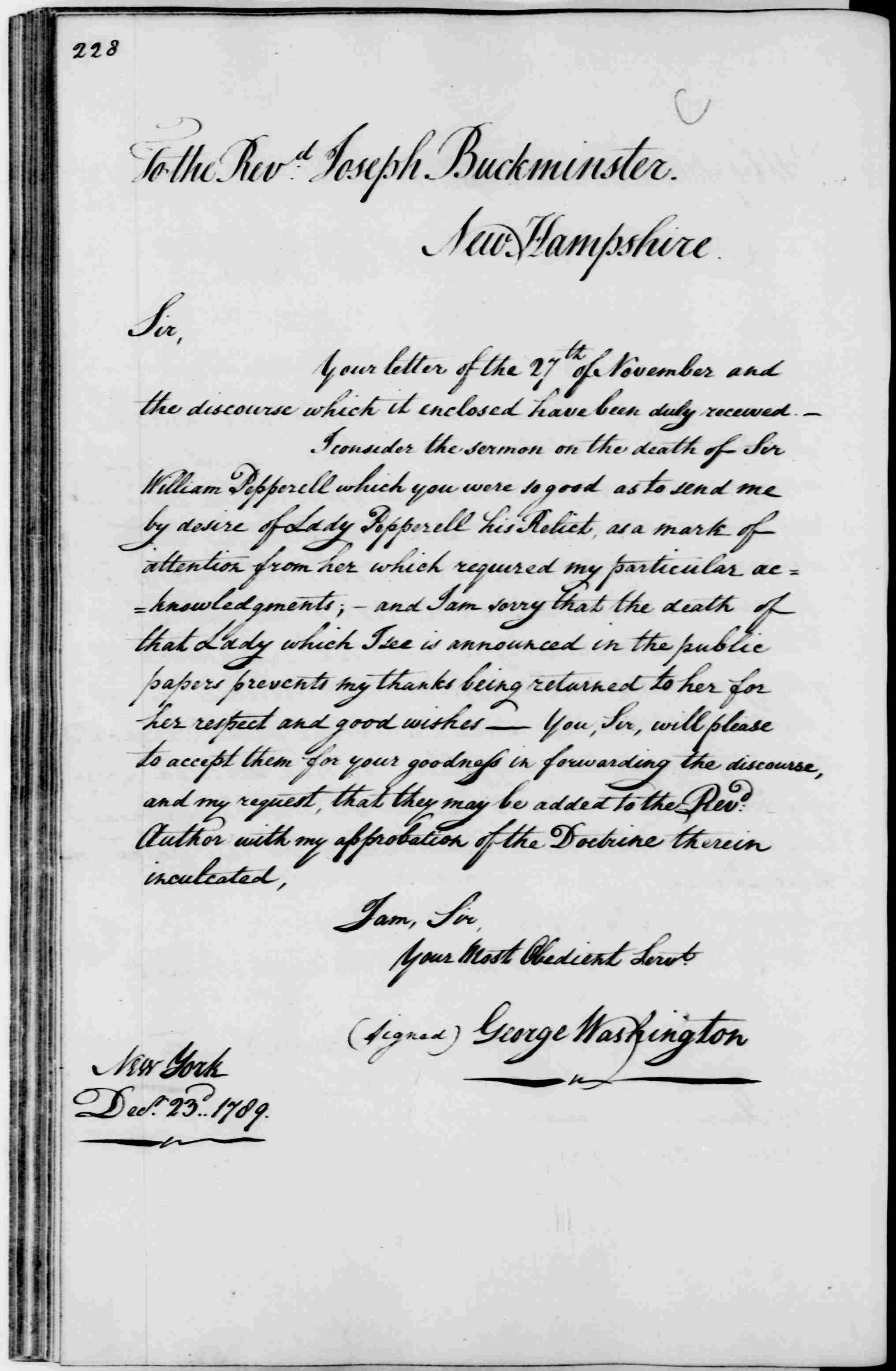
Letter from George Washington praising funeral oration for Pepperrell, 1789

== Legacy ==
- Pepperrell's house is listed on the National Register of Historic Places.
- The town of Pepperell, Massachusetts is named for him. From 1762 to 1805, the town of Saco, Maine, which he had a role in founding, was known as "Pepperrellborough"; there is still a Pepperell Square in downtown Saco.
- Pepperrell Air Force Base, a United States Air Force base located in St. John's, Canada from 1941 to 1960 was named in his honor.
- Namesake of Pepperell St., Halifax, Nova Scotia (which is parallel to Shirley St., named after William Shirley)
- Namesake of Pepperell St., St. Peter’s, Nova Scotia The village of St. Peter’s is the present day name of the former French military colony of Port Toulouse which was destroyed by Pepperell’s troops in 1745 before conquering the Fortress of Louisbourg.

== Notes ==
Baronetage of Great Britain
New creation	Baronet (of Boston); 1746–1759	Extinct
Preceded by Gooch baronets	Pepperell baronets of Boston; 15 November 1746	Succeeded by Fetherstonhaugh baronets
