= Kittery Point, Maine =

- Census-designated place
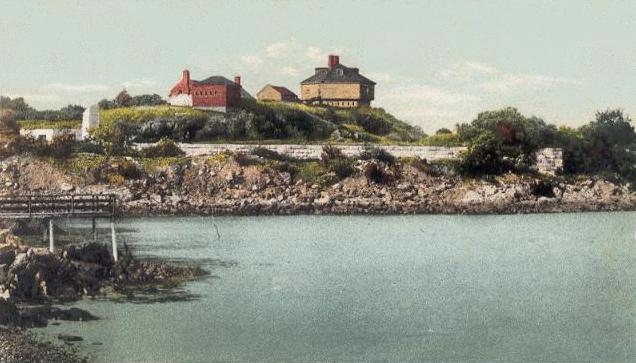
- Fort McClary

- Location within Maine
- Coordinates: 43°05′18″N 70°41′56″W
- Country: United States
- State: Maine
- County: York

Area
  - Total: 2.57 sq mi (6.66 km^{2})
  - Land: 1.91 sq mi (4.94 km^{2})
  - Water: 0.66 sq mi (1.72 km^{2})
- Elevation: 56 ft (17 m)

Population (2020)
  - Total: 1,009
  - Density: 528.8/sq mi (204.18/km^{2})
- Time zone: UTC-5 (Eastern (EST))
  - Summer (DST): UTC-4 (EDT)
- ZIP code: 03905
- Area code: 207
- FIPS code: 23-37375
- GNIS feature ID: 2377923

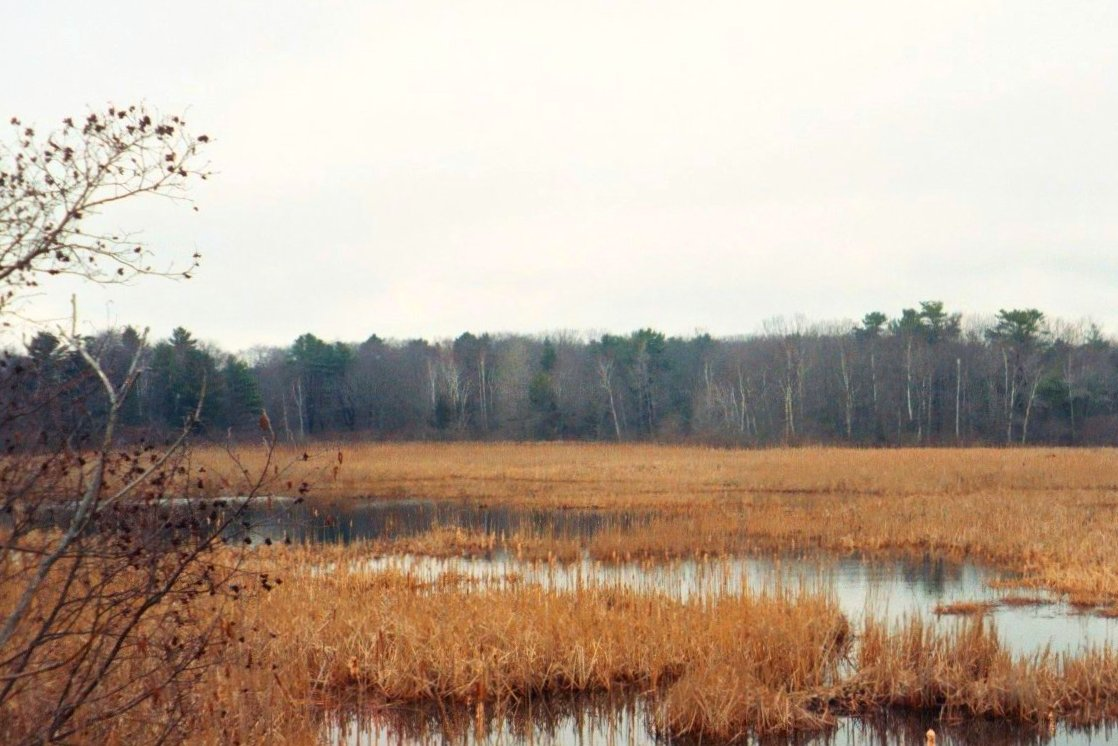
Freshwater marsh

Kittery Point is a census-designated place (CDP) in the town of Kittery, York County, Maine, United States. First settled in 1623, Kittery Point traces its history to the first seafarers who colonized the shore of what became Massachusetts Bay Colony and later the State of Maine. Located beside the Atlantic Ocean, it is home to Fort McClary State Historic Site, and Fort Foster Park on Gerrish Island. Cutts Island is home to Seapoint Beach and the Brave Boat Harbor Division of the Rachel Carson National Wildlife Refuge.

Kittery Point is part of the Portland–South Portland–Biddeford, Maine Metropolitan Statistical Area. As of the 2020 census, Kittery Point had a population of 1,009.

== History ==
Settled as early as 1623, the southern part of Kittery was once called Champernowne's after Sir Francis Champernowne, a prominent merchant adventurer and cousin of Sir Ferdinando Gorges, the prime mover behind settlement north of the Massachusetts Bay Colony. Nicholas Shapleigh built the first house in the area, and Edward Godfrey established a trading post in 1632. Early professions included fishermen, hunters and trappers. Others harvested the region's abundant timber, which was shipped to England or the West Indies. The town of Kittery was incorporated in 1652 when Maine became part of the Massachusetts Bay Colony.

The Pepperrells were a distinguished Kittery Point family who established fisheries to supply the London market. William Pepperrell Sr. had arrived from Devonshire as a lowly fisherman's apprentice at the Isles of Shoals in New Hampshire. He went on to build a mercantile empire, which his son Sir William Pepperrell inherited and expanded. Sir William became the first baronet in New England for commanding a militia which defeated the French in 1745 at the Siege of Louisbourg. His gambrel mansion of 1733 remains a landmark at Pepperrell Cove on the Piscataqua River. In 1760, his widow built the Lady Pepperrell House, a noted Georgian building formerly owned by Historic New England.

Pepperrell himself built an elaborate wooden house called the Sparhawk Mansion at Kittery Point as a gift to his daughter on her marriage to Nathaniel Sparhawk in 1750. Crowned with an elegant cupola, the house contained finely carved panelling in its 19 rooms. In 1967 the Sparhawk Mansion was demolished, as preservation efforts in the area were emerging. More fortunate is the John Bray House, built by a shipwright in 1662 and considered the oldest surviving house in Maine. Recently threatened with redevelopment because of its desirable view of Pepperrell Cove and Portsmouth Harbor, the building has instead been restored. Some speculate that the Bray House was the birthplace of the mother of Sir William Pepperrell, whose father William Pepperrell Sr. married John Bray's daughter Margery, but it is more likely that she was born in England.

On land once owned by Sir William Pepperrell is a Portsmouth Harbor defense called Fort McClary, built opposite Fort Constitution in New Castle, New Hampshire. It is today Fort McClary State Historic Site and features a blockhouse dating from 1844. In 1969, it was listed on the National Register of Historic Places. Fort Foster, a later coastal defense, was built by the federal government on 92 acres (370,000 m^{2}) at Gerrish Island. Now owned by the town of Kittery, Fort Foster Park provides superb views of Portsmouth Harbor, Whaleback Lighthouse and the Isles of Shoals, part of which belongs to Kittery. Near Seapoint Beach in the mid-20th century, the Newcomen Society built a cluster of Tudor cottages at what was then its summer retreat.

== Geography ==
According to the United States Census Bureau, the CDP has a total area of 2.6 square miles (6.7 km^{2}), of which 1.9 square miles (4.9 km^{2}) is land and 1.7 square kilometres (0.66 sq mi) (25.83%) is water. Kittery Point is bounded by Spruce Creek, the Piscataqua River, the Atlantic Ocean and Brave Boat Harbor.

== Demographics ==
Historical population
Census	Pop.	Note	%±
2020	1,009		—
U.S. Decennial Census

As of the census of 2000, there were 1,135 people, 538 households, and 322 families residing in the CDP. The population density was 230.6 people/km^{2} (597 people/mi^{2}). There were 594 housing units at an average density of 120.7 units/km^{2} (313 units/mi^{2}). The racial makeup of the CDP was 97.44% White, 0.97% African American, 0.18% Native American, 0.53% Asian, 0.09% from other races, and 0.79% from two or more races. Hispanic or Latino of any race were 0.53% of the population.

There were 538 households, out of which 19.5% had children under the age of 18 living with them, 50.4% were married couples living together, 6.5% had a female householder with no husband present, and 40.0% were non-families. 31.4% of all households were made up of individuals, and 12.1% had someone living alone who was 65 years of age or older. The average household size was 2.11 and the average family size was 2.64.

In the CDP, the population was spread out, with 16.3% under the age of 18, 3.4% from 18 to 24, 27.5% from 25 to 44, 32.5% from 45 to 64, and 20.3% who were 65 years of age or older. The median age was 46 years. For every 100 females, there were 91.4 males. For every 100 females age 18 and over, there were 88.9 males.

The median income for a household in the CDP was $47,500, and the median income for a family was $53,839. Males had a median income of $40,417 versus $29,808 for females. The per capita income for the CDP was $30,119. About 4.7% of families and 5.8% of the population were below the poverty line, including 13.0% of those under age 18 and 4.4% of those age 65 or over.

== Arts and culture ==
=== Sites of interest ===
- Fort Foster Park
- Fort McClary State Historic Site
- Kittery Historical and Naval Museum
- Rachel Carson National Wildlife Refuge
- Spruce Creek

== Notable people ==
- John Haley Bellamy, woodcarver and folk artist
- Sir William Pepperrell, merchant and soldier
- Celia Thaxter, poet and writer
- John Treworgie, trading post agent and politician
- Helen Magill White, first American female Ph.D.

== Gallery ==
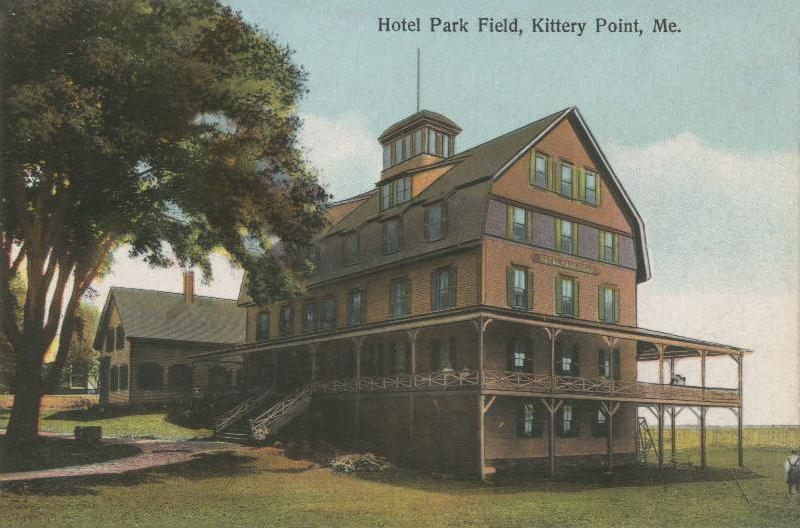
Hotel Parkfield c. 1912

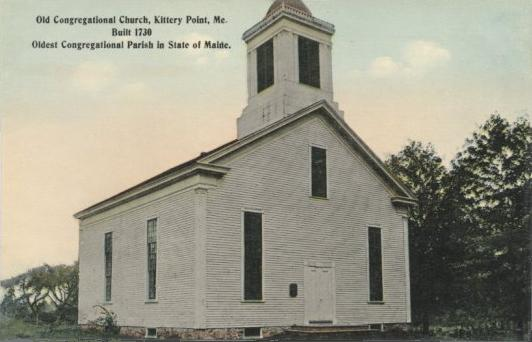
First Congregational Church, built in 1730, as it appeared c. 1912

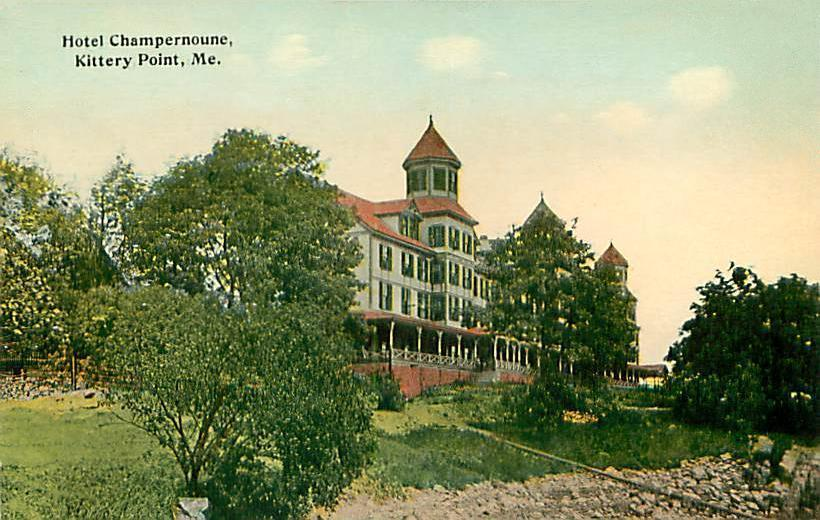
Hotel Champernowne in 1911

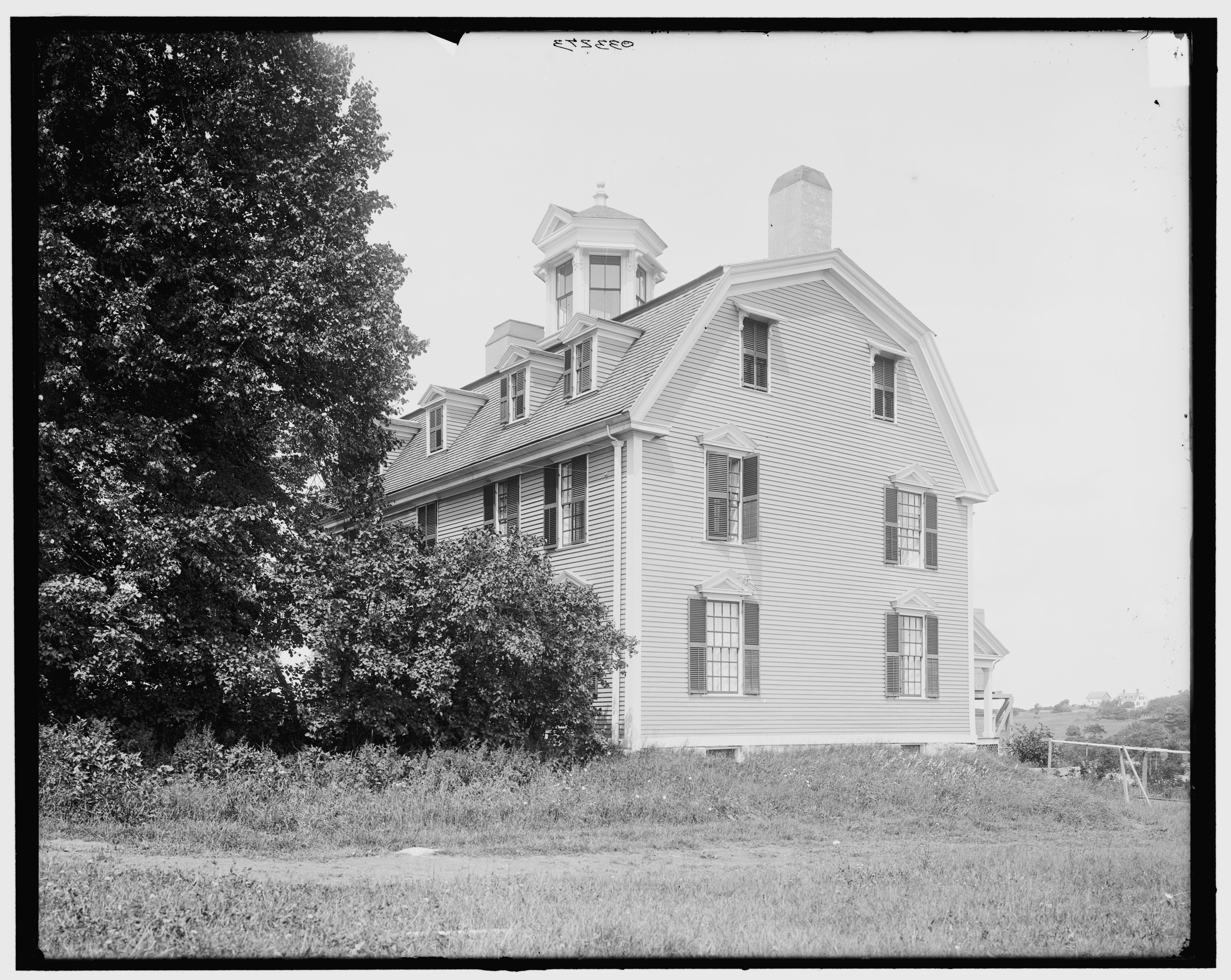
Sparhawk House, c. 1900, later demolished

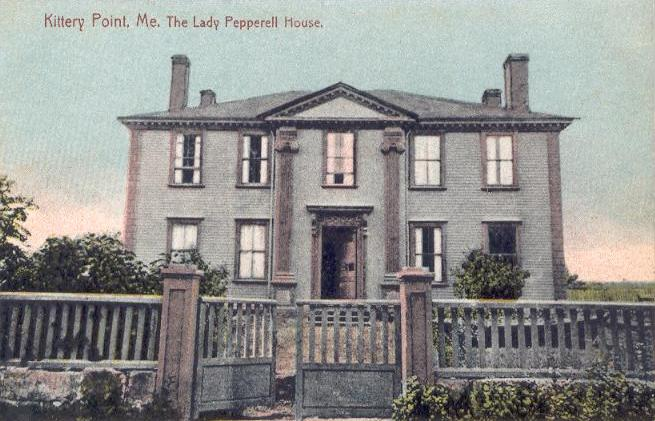
The Lady Pepperrell House c. 1910, now a private home

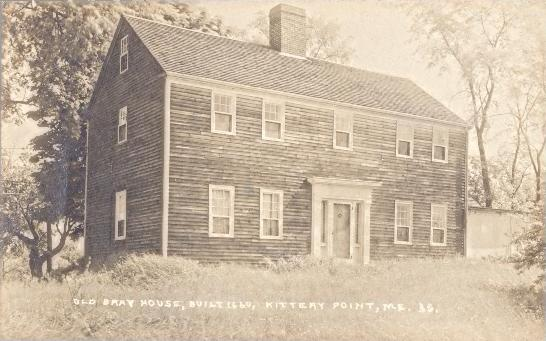
John Bray House c. 1920
