= McIntire Garrison House =

Historic house in Maine, United States

- U.S. National Register of Historic Places
- U.S. National Historic Landmark
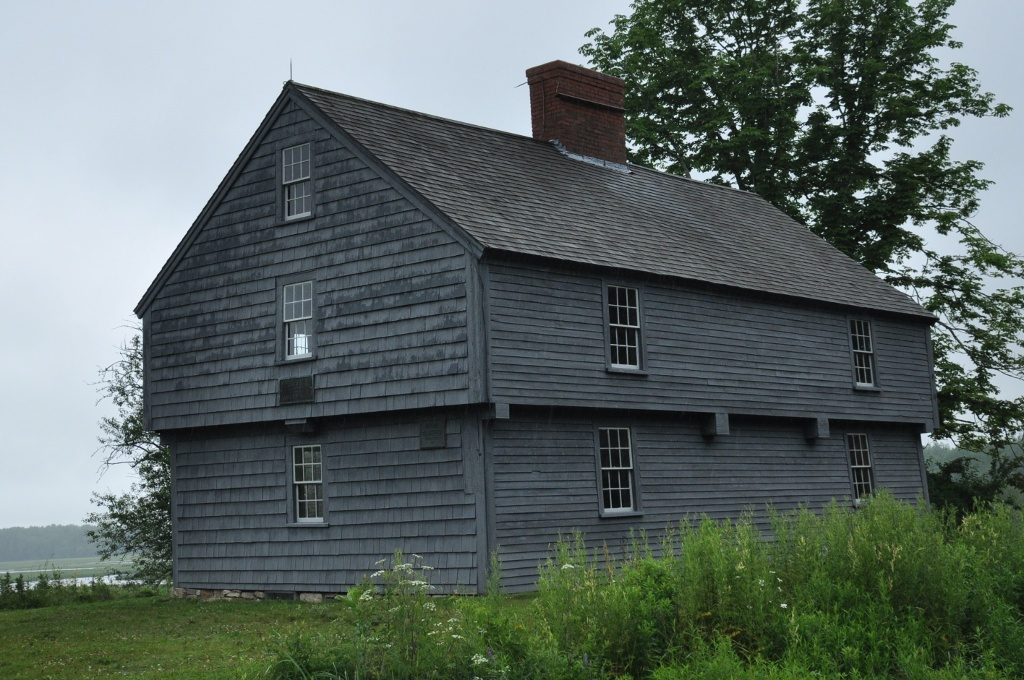
- Side view of the house

- Location within Maine Location within the United States
- Location: Cider Hill Road (SR91), York, Maine
- Coordinates: 43°10′5″N 70°42′49″W
- Area: less than one acre
- Built: 1713
- NRHP reference No.: 68000017

Significant dates
- Added to NRHP: November 24, 1968
- Designated NHL: November 24, 1968

The McIntire Garrison House is a historic house on Cider Hill Road (Maine State Route 91) in York, Maine. Built in 1712, it is an extremely rare well-preserved example of a New England colonial log garrison house, built by settlers for defense against Native American attacks. The house, possibly the oldest in the state, was designated a National Historic Landmark in 1968.

== Description and history ==
The McIntire Garrison House is set on the south side of Cider Hill Road in a rural section of York, Maine, overlooking a bend in the York River. It is a two-story log structure, sheathed in wooden clapboards, with a side-gable roof pierced by a central chimney. The second floor projects slightly over the first floor on all four sides, one side of which has been fitted with a trapdoor to see below. The walls are constructed out of sawn logs 7.5 inches (19 cm) thick, and dovetailed together at the corners. The interior is very plain, with wooden floors, paneled walls, and unfinished ceilings. The extant windows are a later modification, and do not reflect period fenestration.

Traditional sources long maintained that the construction date of this house was in 1645. However, architectural analysis in the 20th century has shown that it was built using methods not adopted until the early 18th century. These types of houses were relatively common in southern Maine during the colonial period, when it was regularly subjected to attack by Native American forces (sometimes with French participation). The building would not have been finished in clapboard at that time. The building was subjected to a "restoration" by early architectural preservationists in the early 20th century, and more historically informed restoration later in the 20th century.

== See also ==
- List of National Historic Landmarks in Maine
- List of the oldest buildings in Maine
- National Register of Historic Places listings in York County, Maine
