= Spruce Creek (Maine) =

Coordinates: 43°06′04″N 70°43′21″W

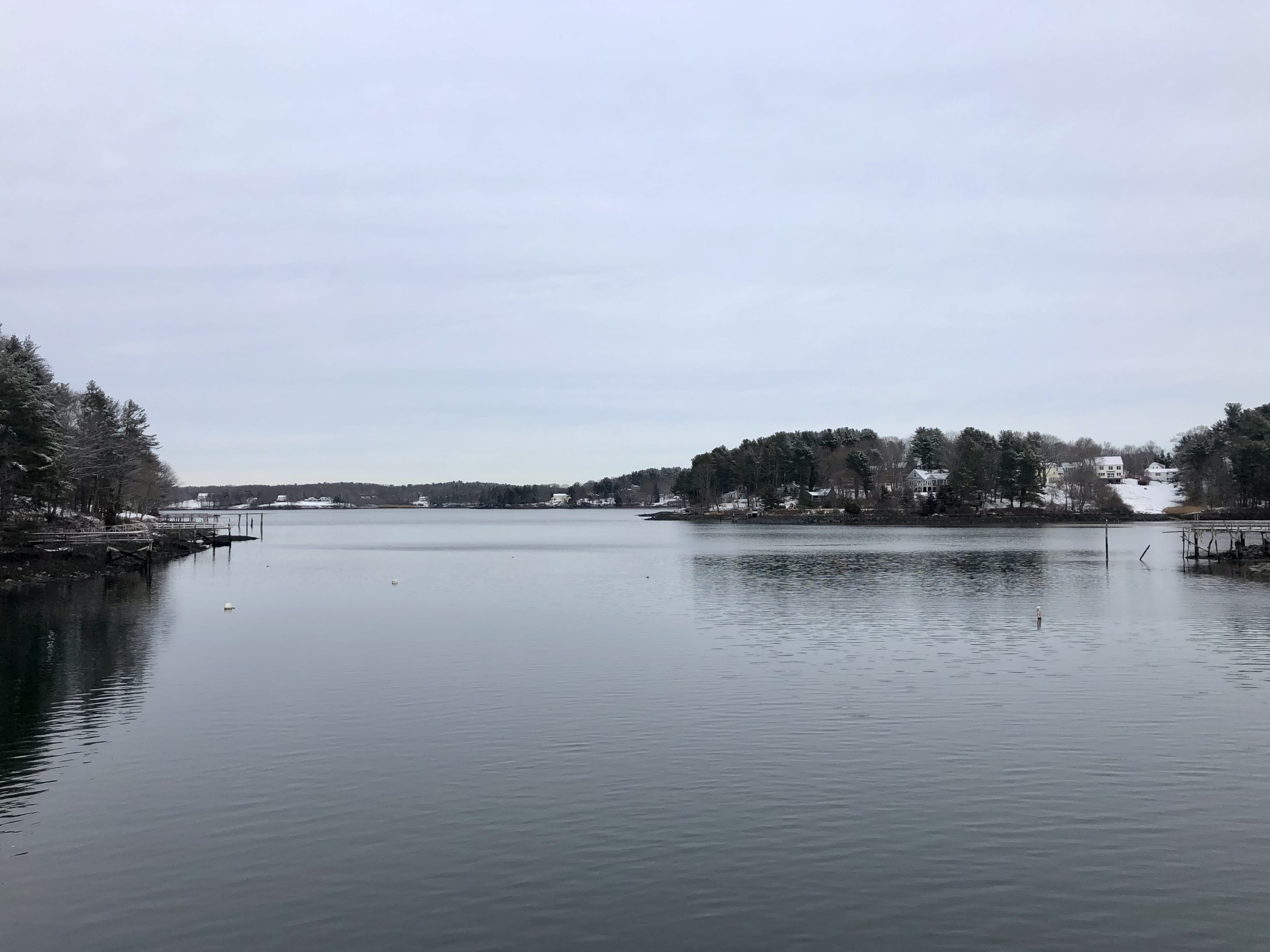
- The creek seen from the Kittery Point Bridge, where it meets the Piscataqua River. c. 2021

- Location within New Hampshire Location within Maine Location within the United States

Location
- Country: United States
- States: Maine
- Counties: York, ME
- Towns and cities: Eliot, ME, Kittery, ME

Physical characteristics
- Source
  - location: Eliot, ME
  - elevation: 60 ft (18 m)
- Mouth: Piscataqua River
  - location: Kittery, ME
  - elevation: 0 ft (0 m)
- Length: 5.25 mi (8.45 km)

Spruce Creek is a 5.25 miles (8.45 km) long tidal creek in York County, Maine beginning in Eliot, Maine and flows to the Atlantic ocean in Kittery, Maine. The creek drops 60 feet (18 m) from the headwaters and flows south and southeasterly direction through the heavily populated town of Kittery before emptying into 2.5 square miles (6.5 km^{2}) of clam flats and joining the Piscataqua River.

The town of Kittery has a volunteer organization whose mission is to protect the watershed and help to restore water quality. The Spruce Creek Association was established more than ten years ago and actively monitors sources of bacteria and has implemented best management practice for water pollution for residential, commercial, and municipal properties in the creek watershed area.

== History ==
In May 1698, a farmer by the name of Enoch Hutchins was killed by members of the Abenaki tribe while working in his fields along Spruce Creek. His wife and three sons were taken captive and brought north to Canada. They eventually escaped and made their way back to Maine.

In April 1705, Enoch Hutchins Jr. was again attacked by natives and died a year later from his wounds. His children and wife were taken captive.

Spruce Creek was also the site of several 17th and 18th tide mills, including the Thompson tide mill dam built circa 1694.
