= Shirley's Regiment =

Line infantry regiment of the British Army

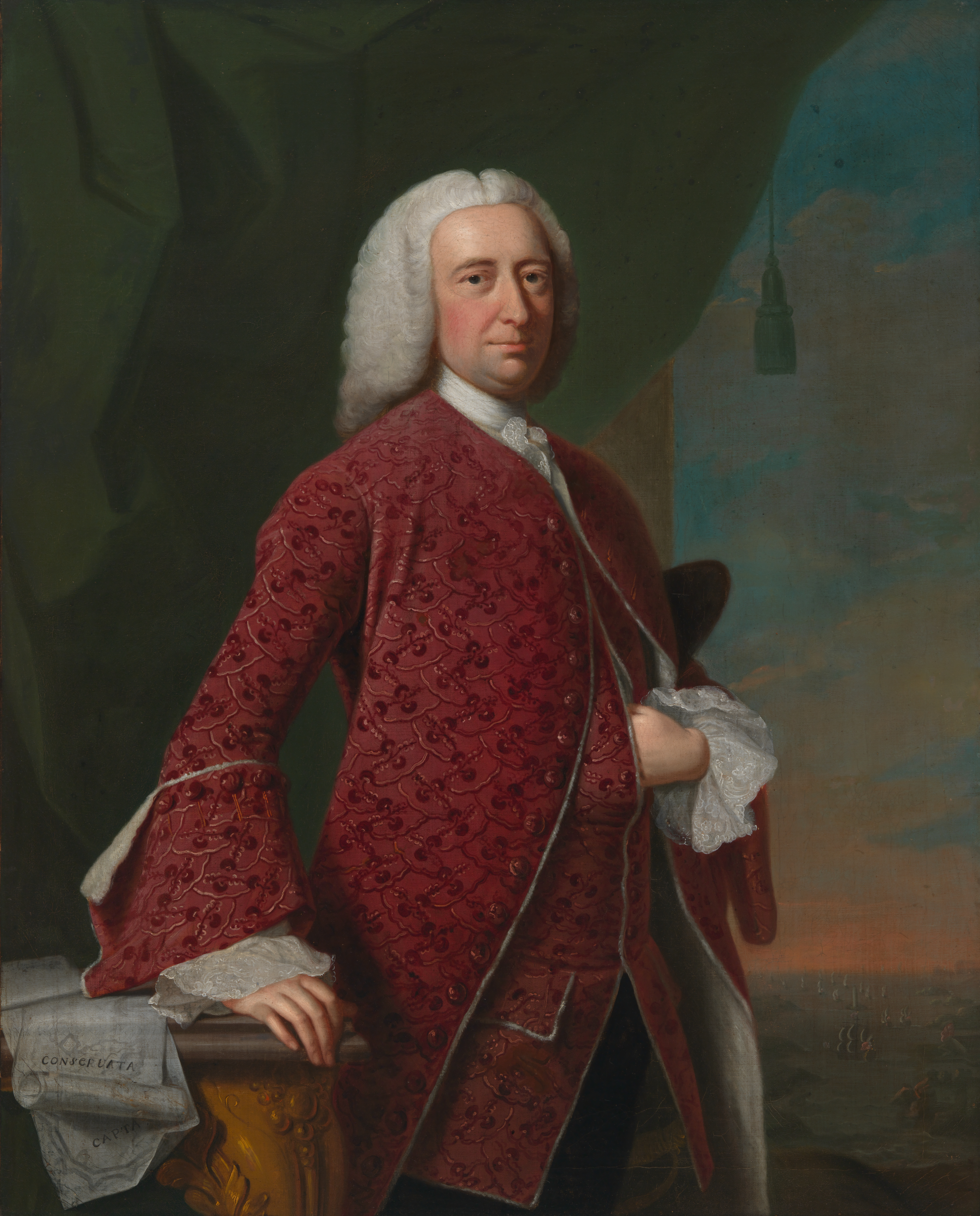
William Shirley, the colonel of the regiment's first iteration

Shirley's Regiment was a line infantry regiment of the British Army. The first iteration of the regiment was raised as William Shirley's Regiment of Foot by Colonel William Shirley in the New England Colonies in 1745 for service in King George's War. It was ranked as the 65th Regiment of Foot in September 1745 and served in the war before being disbanded in May 1749. The regiment was re-raised in New England as the 50th Regiment of Foot (American Provincials) in December 1754 for service in the French and Indian War and was stationed at Fort Oswego. At the Battle of Fort Oswego the regiment surrendered alongside the 51st Regiment of Foot (Cape Breton Regiment) and the rest of the fort's garrison to French forces on 14 August 1756, resulting in the destruction of the two regiments, both of which were subsequently disbanded in December 1756.
