= Garrison (architecture) =

Architectural style of house

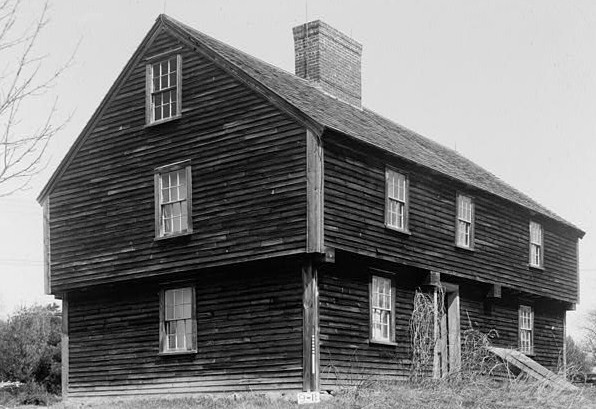
McIntire Garrison House (1707) in York, Maine, a prototype of the garrison style. The overhang in timber framing is called jettying.

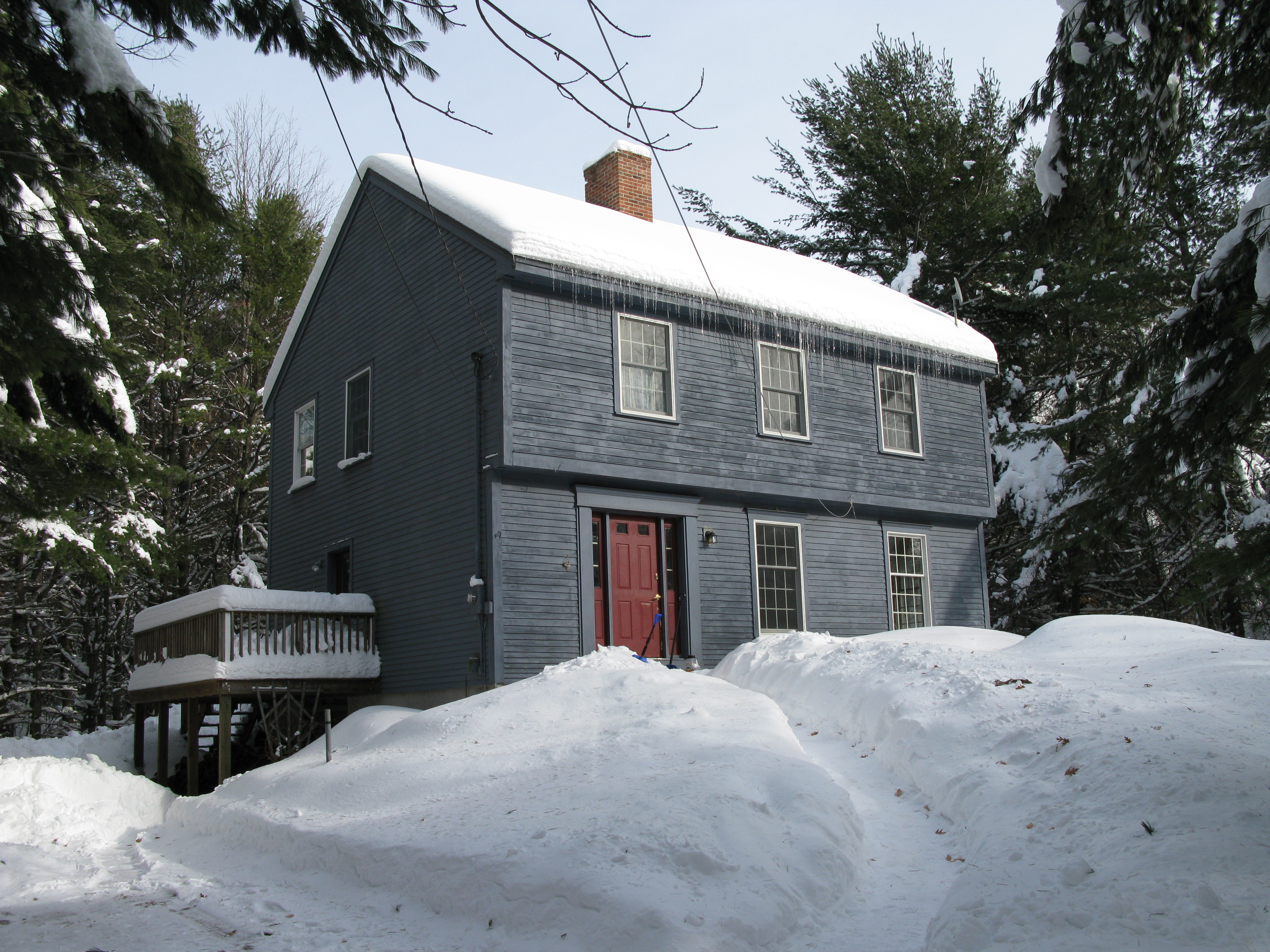
Olsen-Hesketh House, Blake Road, Brownfield, Maine, a contemporary garrison colonial built 1988–89.

A garrison is an architectural style of house, typically two stories with the second story overhanging in the front. The traditional ornamentation is four carved drops (pineapple, strawberry or acorn shape) below the overhang. Garrisons usually have an exterior chimney at the end. Older versions have casement windows with small panes of glass, while later versions have double-hung windows. The second-story windows often are smaller than those on the first floor. Dormers often break through the cornice line.

Historically, the term garrison means:

1. a group of soldiers;
2. a defensive structure;
3. the location of a group of soldiers is assigned, such as garrison house or garrison town.

"The term garrison refers to the military or defensive character of a house", but not as heavily built as a blockhouse. "Garrisons, or fortified houses, were built in almost all New England towns, and they were particularly common in the frontier towns of Maine and New Hampshire... Like an ordinary house in plan and appearance, garrisons were used in times of peace as one-family dwellings, but were strongly built and capable of protecting a number of families in times of danger such as attacks from natives ." Construction methods typically used log walls or thick planks with a timber frame construction called plank frame construction or simply a plank house.
