= Hunnewell House =

Historic house in Maine, United States

- U.S. National Register of Historic Places
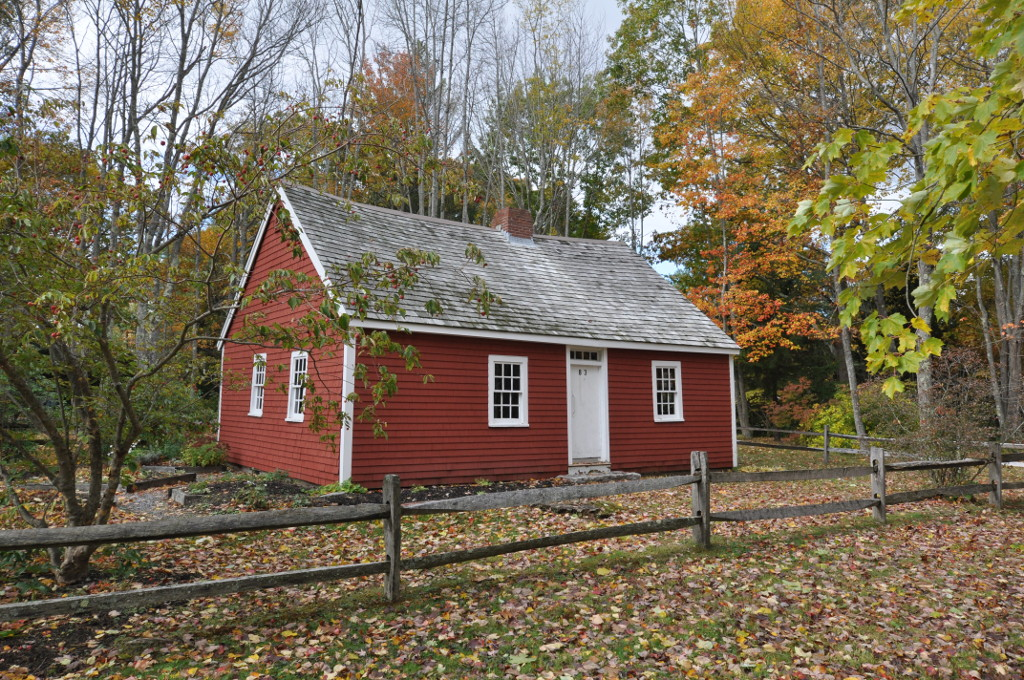

- Location within Maine Location within the United States
- Nearest city: Scarborough, Maine
- Coordinates: 43°34′50″N 70°19′55″W
- Area: 1 acre (0.40 ha)
- Built: 1702
- Built by: Hunnewell, Richard
- Architectural style: Cape Cod
- NRHP reference No.: 76000093
- Added to NRHP: May 12, 1976

The Hunnewell House is one of the oldest surviving structures in the United States state of Maine. Located on Old County Road near Black Point Road in Scarborough, Maine, this modest single-story building was probably built in 1702-03 by Richard Hunnewell, who had first settled in Scarborough in 1684. Although, the exact year of construction is in doubt, with some accounts listing it as 1673. The house was listed on the National Register of Historic Places in 1976. It is now owned and maintained by the town.

== Description and history ==
The Hunnewell House is located in central Scarborough, in a triangular wooded island formed by Black Point Road (Maine State Route 207), Old County Road, and Winnocks Neck Road. It is a 1 1/2-story Cape style wood-frame structure, three bays wide, with clapboard siding and a stone foundation. Its windows are 19th-century sash windows, and the main door is topped by a four-light transom window. The interior of the house follows a typical central-chimney plan, with a small entry vestibule with a winding staircase to the attic, and rooms to either side. Trim and decoration are minimal.

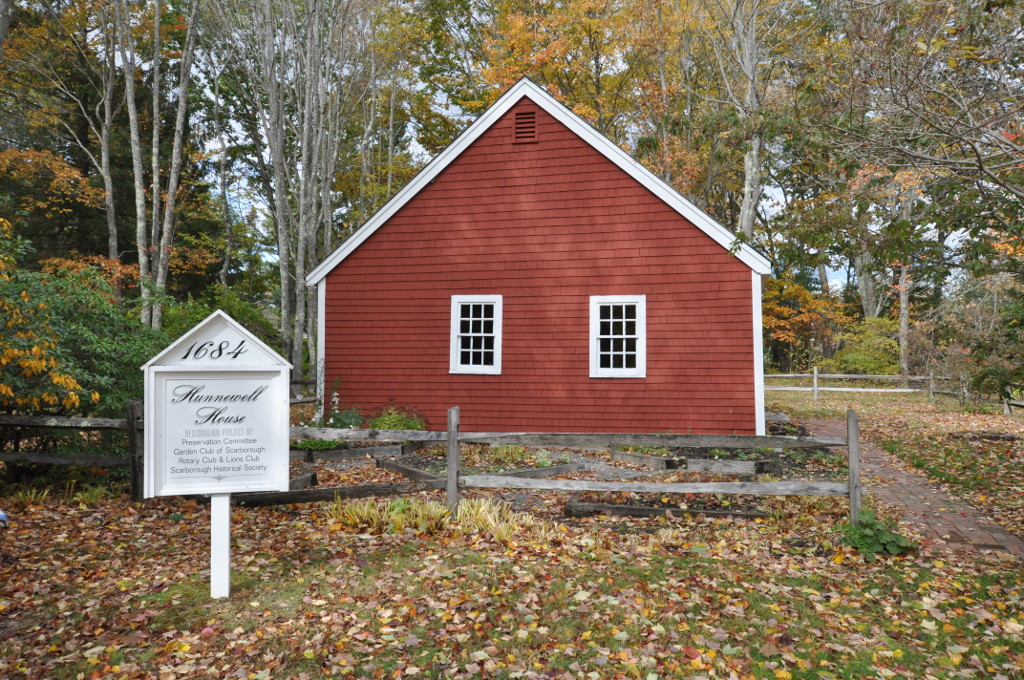

Although Maine was settled by European colonists in the 17th century, most of its settlements were abandoned as a result of either King Philip's War (1675–78) or King William's War (1688-97). Richard Hunnewell, a veteran of King Philip's War, was one of the signatories to Scarborough's incorporation in 1684. His wife and child were killed in an Indian raid. They were found scalped and mutilated. (A common treatment for women and children at that time) Because of this he became a leader of the local militia and carried an implacable hatred of Native Americans. He killed as many indians as he could find, and after many battles he developed scars rendering one of his eyes injured. Thus the nickname Crazy Eye, Richard Hunnewell. The small community was abandoned in 1690 due to continuing Native raids and was reoccupied in 1702. It is believed that the present Hunnewell House was built early in this reoccupation; Hunnewell was killed in a major raid on Maine coastal communities in 1703, after peace agreements had been made. He was a hero of his time and prevented many locals from vicious attacks from the local tribes. The community survived, and Hunnewell's widow (his second wife) lived here until her death in 1732.

The house was originally located in a field off Old County Road. It sat abandoned for many years, until its historical significance was established in 1971 by the local Rotary Club. The house was given to the town, and moved to its present location in 1973, where it has since undergone restorative work.

== The Other Hunnewell Houses ==
On Hunnewell Road at the peak of the hill, there are two Hunnewell houses that are said to have been built in the 1670s by Richard and Roger Hunnewell and their families. The larger, built by Richard, was said to have been built in 1671 and later burned down. It was rebuilt in 1731 and stands today. At the intersection of the high ridge behind Roger's house and the old Douphinette property, there is a Hunnewell family cemetery identifiable today only by the depressions in the ground. The gravestones for Richard and Roger were in a closet at Richard's house last I knew. According to a neighbor, the rest of the headstones were discarded long ago at the rear of the 71 acre property. We never did find them.

It was said that the Hunnewell barn was a stop for the Concord to Portland Stagecoach. In conjunction with that story, it was said that a stage carrying a shipment of gold headed to Concord was attacked and captured on the trail between the Nonesuch and the Richard Hunnewell homestead, and the gold was never recovered. Allegedly the Natives buried the gold box under a large boulder somewhere on the Hunnewell property. It had not been recovered by the time I was left there in 1968.

There was at least one murder in the history of the property; and one suicide in which a depressed lady drowned herself in the well near the rear entry of Richard's house. Richard's homestead included an excellent apple orchard, a large blueberry patch, a large vegetable garden, a gravel/sand pit or two, lots of forest and bordered the Nonesuch River on one side.

Based on the personal experiences of Kenneth A. Capron who lived there 1956 - 1968, spending his entire childhood digging under boulders!

== See also ==
- National Register of Historic Places listings in Cumberland County, Maine
