= Bray House (Kittery Point, Maine) =

Historic house in Maine, United States

- U.S. National Register of Historic Places
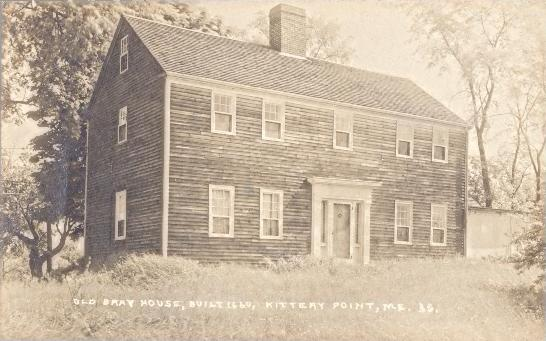

- Location within Maine Location within the United States
- Location: Pepperell Rd., Kittery Point, Maine
- Coordinates: 43°4′58″N 70°42′10″W
- Area: less than one acre
- Built: ca. 1720–1740
- Architect: Bray, John
- NRHP reference No.: 79000271
- Added to NRHP: October 09, 1979

The Bray House is a historic house at 100 Pepperell Road in Kittery Point, Maine, United States. It is one of the oldest surviving buildings in the state. Long thought to be a 17th-century structure, the architectural evidence indicates the home was probably not built before 1720. It was added to the National Register of Historic Places in 1979.

== History ==
The Bray House is set on the south side of Pepperell Road (Maine State Route 103), on a site overlooking the mouth of the Piscataqua River. It is a 2 1/2-story wood-frame residential structure, whose main block is five bays wide, with a side-gable roof, large central chimney, clapboard siding, and granite foundation. The entrance, centered on the river-facing south facade, is flanked by sidelight windows and pilasters and topped by an entablature. A former two-story extension to the east added two bays, and a narrow connecting segment joined the main house to a second 2 1/2-story house, oriented perpendicular to the main block, that was moved to this property in the early 20th century. All but the original central structure was demolished in 2017.

While this location is known to be the place where John Bray built a house in about 1662, it was impossible at the time of the National Registry of Historic Properties nomination to determine whether parts of Bray's original house survive in the present structure; the construction methods and styling of the house are consistent with a construction date of about 1720. This is still adequate to make the house one of Maine's oldest surviving structures. Extensive formal Georgian interior detailing was added in the mid-18th century.

Daryl Hall of Hall & Oates fame purchased the house at auction in 2008 and undertook a partial restoration. He sold the restored property for $2.0 million; the new owners have demolished all but the original structure, which is now flanked by modernist angular new construction.

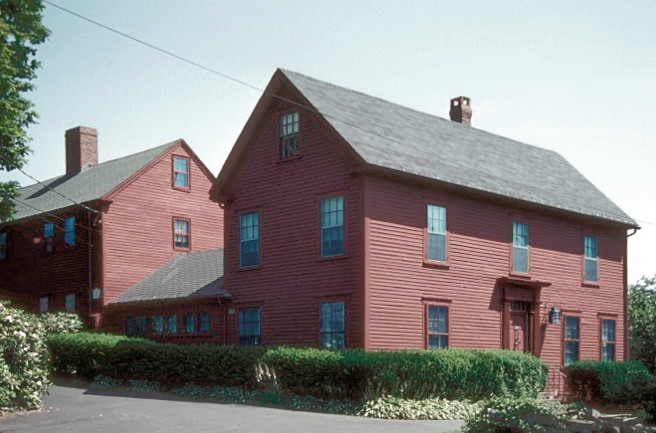
Original Bray home on far left (c. 2014)

== See also ==
- List of the oldest buildings in Maine
- National Register of Historic Places listings in York County, Maine
