= First Congregational Church and Parsonage (Kittery, Maine) =

Historic church in Maine, United States

- U.S. National Register of Historic Places
- U.S. Historic district
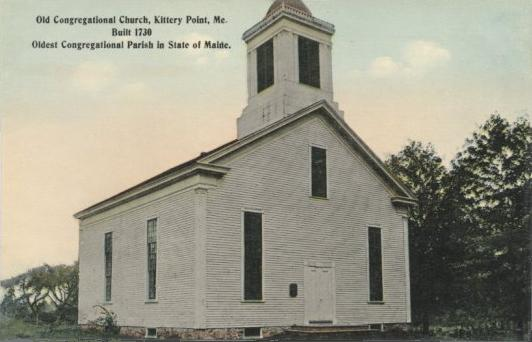
- Postcard view of church, c. 1912

- Location within Maine Location within the United States
- Location: 23 Pepperrell Rd., Kittery Point, Maine
- Coordinates: 43°4′54″N 70°42′56″W
- Area: 2 acres (0.81 ha) (original); 1 acre (0.40 ha) (increase)
- Built: 1729 and 1733
- Architectural style: Greek Revival, Colonial
- NRHP reference No.: 78000333 (original); 97000602 (increase)

Significant dates
- Added to NRHP: December 18, 1978
- Boundary increase: July 03, 1997

The First Congregational Church and Parsonage is a historic church complex at 23 Pepperrell Road (Maine State Route 103) in the Kittery Point section of Kittery, Maine. Built in 1730 for a congregation first organized in 1653, the church is the oldest in Kittery, and one of the oldest in the state of Maine. It is accompanied by a parsonage house, built in 1729, and a small cemetery, established in 1733. The buildings were listed on the National Register of Historic Places in 1978; the cemetery was added to the listing in 1997.

== Description and history ==
The First Congregational Church in Kittery was organized in 1653. In 1729 this congregation elected to build a new parsonage. Although completed the same year, the adjacent 1728 church building burned down, and the present church building was constructed the following year. It was built with the support of merchant William Pepperrell, Sr., the father of French and Indian War hero, William Pepperrell, also an active member of the congregation. In 1733 the parish established a burial ground south of church (across Pepperrell Road), which is now the burial site of many of the town's leading citizens. A new parsonage was built in 1910, between the old one and the church. Nearby is the Lady Pepperrell House, built in 1760.

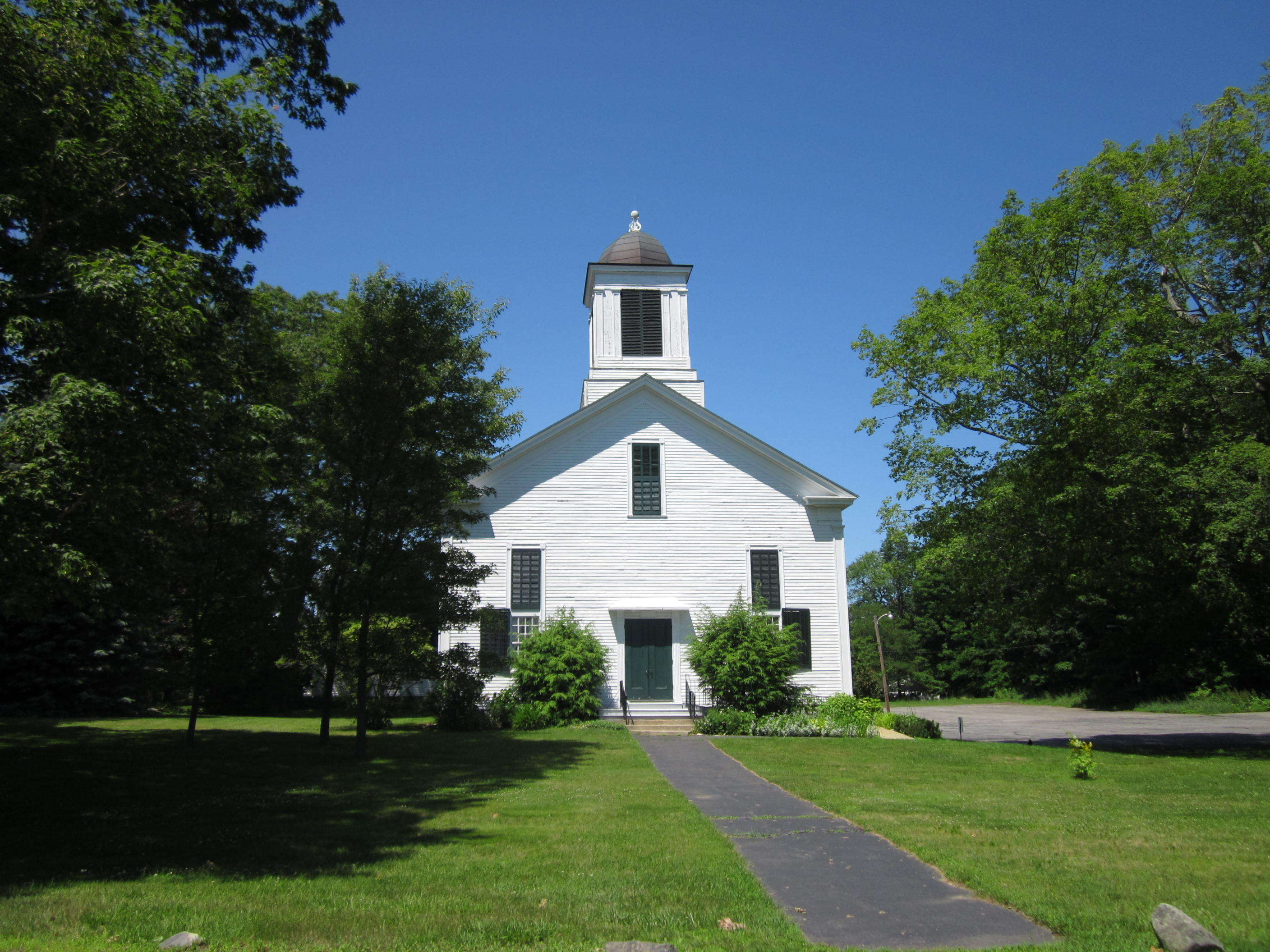
The church in 2011

The church is a modest rectangular wood-frame structure, now facing south, with a gable roof and a small tower. The three-bay main facade has the main entrance at its center, with tall windows in the outer bays, and a smaller sash window above the entrance in the gable. Greek Revival paneled pilasters are found at the building corners. The square tower has a short first stage, topped by a belfry with louvered openings and pilasters. The tower is capped by a segmented dome. The building has seen numerous alterations, and most of its decorative elements are the result of Greek Revival renovations in 1840. The building interior retains its original two-aisle layout and its pulpit. The building was moved a short distance to its present site and orientation in 1872.

The old parsonage is a 2 1/2-story wood-frame building, with a five-bay facade facing south, and a long five-bay two-story ell extending to the rear, facing the road to the west. In 1958 a second ell was added to the north side. After the new parsonage was built in 1910, this building was used as a community center.

The cemetery is about 1 acre (0.40 ha) in size, and is bounded on three sides by a low stone wall, believed to date to 1733, and on the fourth by the Piscataqua River. An iron gate, mounted on concrete posts with round-arch panels and finials, was added to the north entrance in 1910. Burials in the cemetery date from the mid-18th to mid-20th centuries. The most prominent marker is dedicated to the crew of the Hattie Eaton, lost at sea with all hands in 1876.

== Notable members ==
- William Pepperrell, Baronet, judge, military leader
- William Whipple, signer of the United States Declaration of Independence

== See also ==
- List of the oldest churches in the United States
- National Register of Historic Places listings in York County, Maine
