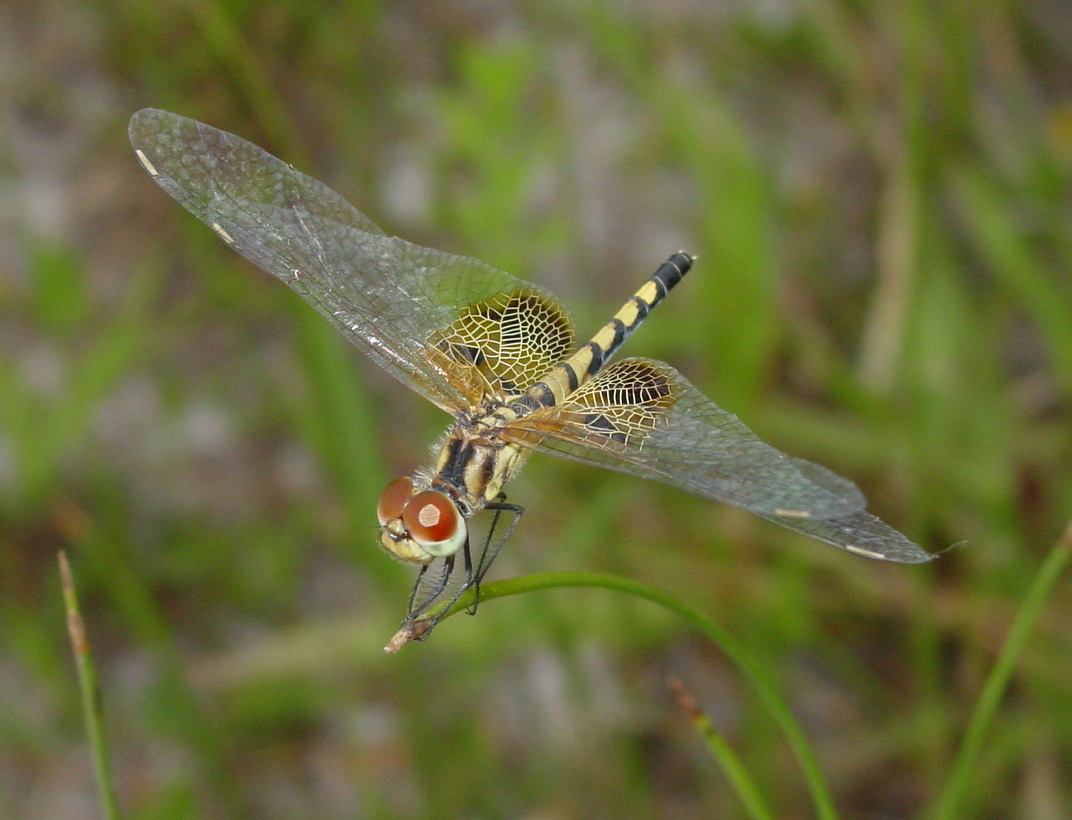

Conservation status
- Least Concern (IUCN 3.1)

- Secure (NatureServe)

Scientific classification
- Kingdom: Animalia
- Phylum: Arthropoda
- Class: Insecta
- Order: Odonata
- Infraorder: Anisoptera
- Family: Libellulidae
- Genus: Celithemis
- Species: C. amanda

Binomial name
- Celithemis amanda Hagen, 1861

= Amanda's pennant =

Species of dragonfly

Amanda's pennant (Celithemis amanda) is a species of dragonfly in the family Libellulidae. It is native to the southeastern United States.

== Description ==
This species is 24 to 31 millimeters long with a hindwing 21 to 27 millimeters long. The face is yellow, darkening to brown or red in older male specimens. The thorax is yellow, darkening to brown. The abdomen is dark brown to black with a few dorsal spots and yellow or red markings. The bases of the hindwings are amber or brown with a black stripe.

Celithemis ornata is similar but has a dark spot at the base of each hindwing with more stripes.

== Biology ==
This species lives in marshes and other calm waters with abundant partially submerged vegetation.
