= Williamsonia =

Williamsonia may refer to:

- Williamsonia, a genus of dragonflies also known as boghaunters
- Williamsonia, an extinct genus of plants in the family Williamsoniaceae
