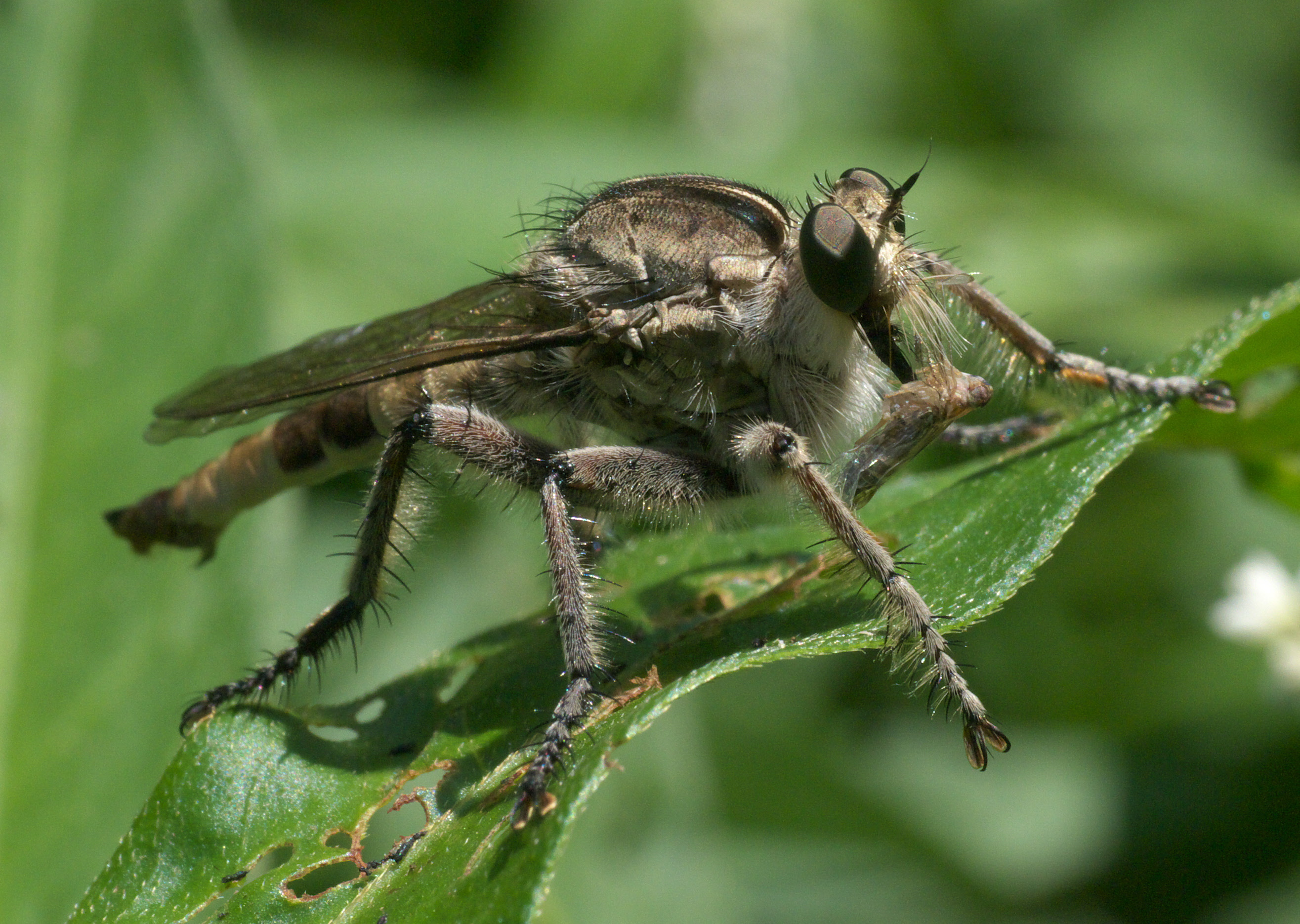

Scientific classification
- Domain: Eukaryota
- Kingdom: Animalia
- Phylum: Arthropoda
- Class: Insecta
- Order: Diptera
- Family: Asilidae
- Genus: Triorla
- Species: T. interrupta

Binomial name
- Triorla interrupta (Macquart, 1834)

Synonyms
- Asilus interruptus Macquart, 1834; Erax ambiguus Macquart, 1846; Erax lateralis Macquart, 1838

= Triorla interrupta =

Species of fly

Triorla interrupta is a species of robber flies in the family Asilidae.

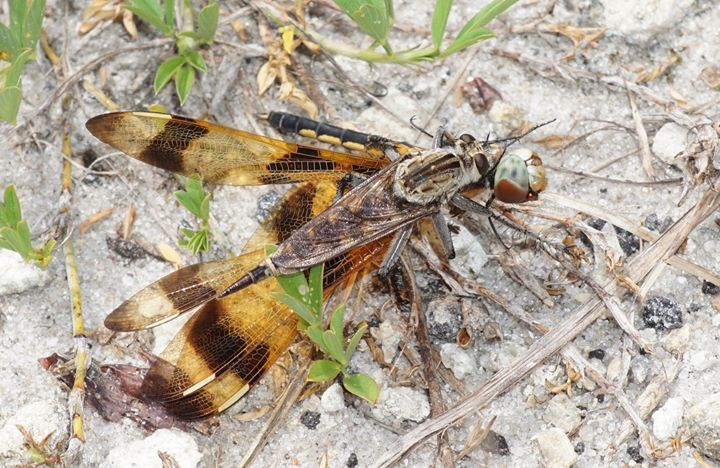
Eating a Halloween pennant
