= Forcepstail =

Forcepstail may refer to:

- Japygidae, a family of two-pronged bristletails.
- Aphylla, genus of dragonflies commonly known as greater forcepstails.
- Phyllocycla, genus of dragonflies commonly known as lesser forcepstails.
