= Martha Wadsworth =

Martha (Mattie) Wadsworth
- born: July 26, 1862, Manchester, Maine
- Died: December 19, 1943 (age 81) Manchester, Maine
- Also known as: Mattie Wadsworth Miss Wadsworth M. Wadsworth

Martha (Mattie) Wadsworth (1862-1943) was an amateur entomologist and one of the first women to publish in Entomological News. She had long-term correspondence with Philip P. Calvert, and the species Celithemis martha was named in her honor by Edward Bruce Williamson.

She lived in Rural Maine, and published a short paper in volume 1 of Entomological News in 1890 about the dragonflies of Manchester, Maine, subsequently publishing there 5 more times. She discovered a dragonfly, ‘’Celithemis martha’’, near her home, which was then named after her.

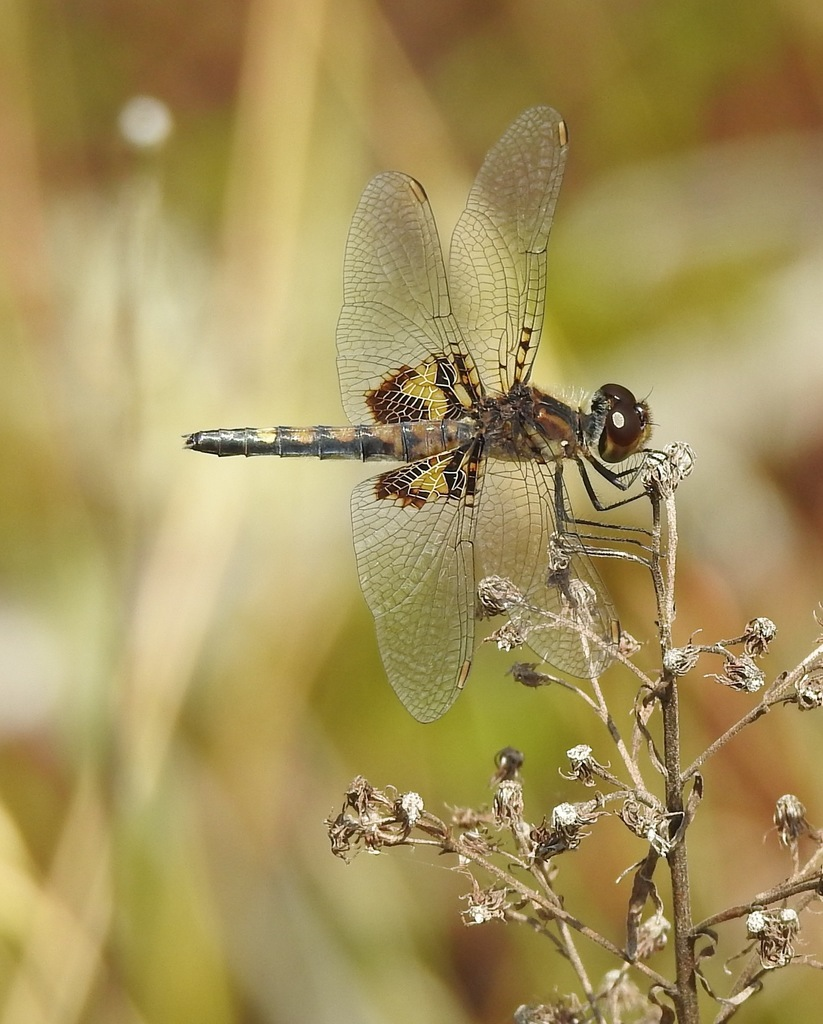
Celithemis martha, the species of dragonfly named after her

== Work ==
She worked mostly in Manchester, Maine, and as of 1955 her collection was housed partly in the L.C. Bates Museum at Good Will-Hinckley. All of her specimens, except those she traded for, were collected within 2 miles of her home. Most of her collection is housed to this day at the National Museum of Natural History in Washington, D.C. and Academy of Natural Sciences of Philadelphia. She had frequent mail correspondence with Philip P. Calvert, and her letters to him are preserved in the Ewell Sale Stewart Library archives of the Academy of Natural Sciences of Philadelphia. Other women who sent specimens to Calvert included Annie Trumbull Slosson and “Miss A. M. Sharp” of Iowa.

Her specimens of Regal Fritillary butterflies were used in the book "Butterflies of Maine and the Canadian Maritime Provinces", which included specimens from the L. C. Bates Museum. The regal fritillary is no longer present in Maine, which makes these specimens very important. Additionally, she was one of very few Maine residents interested in Odonata at the time, and her records, among with a few others, provide very important information for comparison with modern Maine Odonata. She published and updated a list of the dragonflies present in Manchester.

== Personal life ==
Martha (Mattie) Wadsworth was born in Manchester, Maine, in 1862. She was a quaker. Though most of her publications were on Odonata, she was initially interested in Lepidoptera and Coleoptera.

=== childhood ===
Mattie and her sister rose joined chapter 535 of the Agassiz Association in Hallowell, Maine, giving her an early introduction to natural history. As a child, she was very interested in stamp collecting, and later became president of the Augusta, Maine stamp club.

=== Entomology ===
She corresponded and traded specimens with entomologists all over the world, though due to poor health and family issues she stayed close to home. She met Philip P. Calvert through ads in Swiss Cross, the journal of the Agassiz Association, of which both were members. Her first letter to him read:

"Mr. Calvert,

Dear Sir, In the June number of Swiss Cross I saw your offer to send blanks for notes on the Odonata to those who wish them. If you will send me one of these blanks, I will do my best to fill it out and, as I know but few of the names of the dragonflies, may send some to you for identification, if you are willing. I have collected more than eight hundred species of insect here, about fifty of them belonging to the Neuroptera, and though I am familiar with the butterflies and many moths and beetles, have never seen any work on dragonflies. I shall try to learn a great deal about them this season.

Respectfully, Miss Mattie Wadsworth, Hallowell, Maine"
