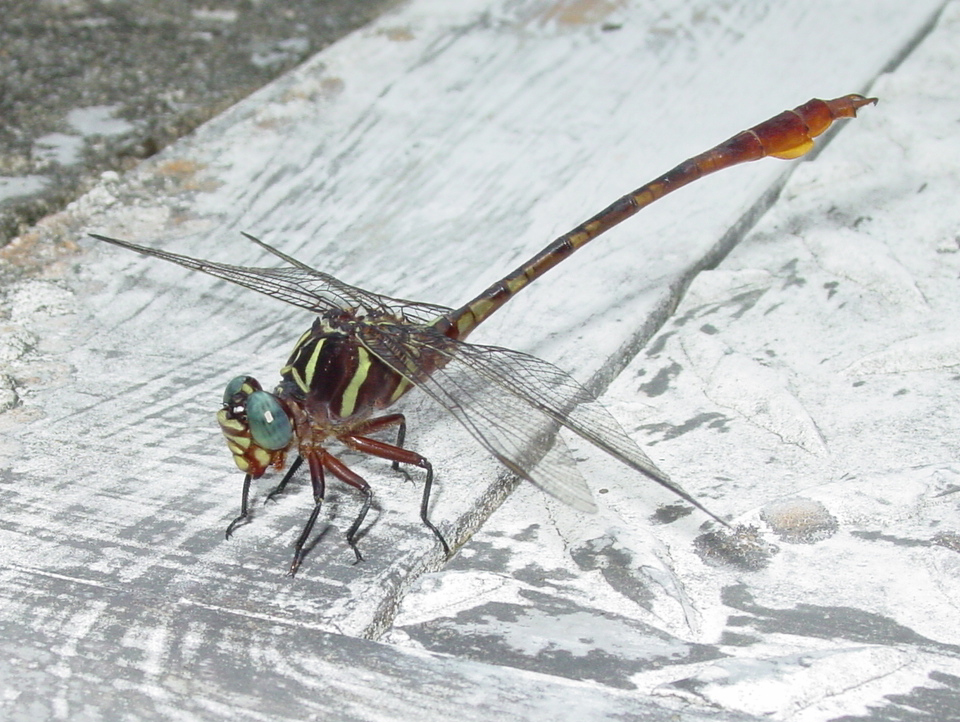

Conservation status
- Least Concern (IUCN 3.1)

Scientific classification
- Kingdom: Animalia
- Phylum: Arthropoda
- Clade: Pancrustacea
- Class: Insecta
- Order: Odonata
- Suborder: Anisoptera
- Family: Gomphidae
- Genus: Aphylla
- Species: A. williamsoni

Binomial name
- Aphylla williamsoni (Gloyd, 1936)
- Range map of the two-striped forceptail (Aphylla williamsoni).

= Aphylla williamsoni =

Species of dragonfly

Aphylla williamsoni, the two-striped forceptail, is a species of clubtails in the family Gomphidae. It is found in North America.

The IUCN conservation status of Aphylla williamsoni is "LC", least concern, with no immediate threat to the species' survival. The population is stable.

== Description ==
Aphylla williamsoni is a large, dark brown dragonfly with blue eyes and yellow markings. The thorax is dark brown with two yellow stripes on each side and additional stripes on the front/top. Additional, thinner, lateral stripes may be present, especially on females. The abdomen is dark brown, with yellow-marked basal segments and terminal segments washed with orange. The flanges of the "club" are yellow. Males have large, forceps-like cerci.

Apylla williamsoni nymphs have no color pattern and are nearly hairless. As with other members of the genus Aphylla, the tenth abdominal segment is distinctively elongated. They may reach 68 millimetres (2.7 in) long.

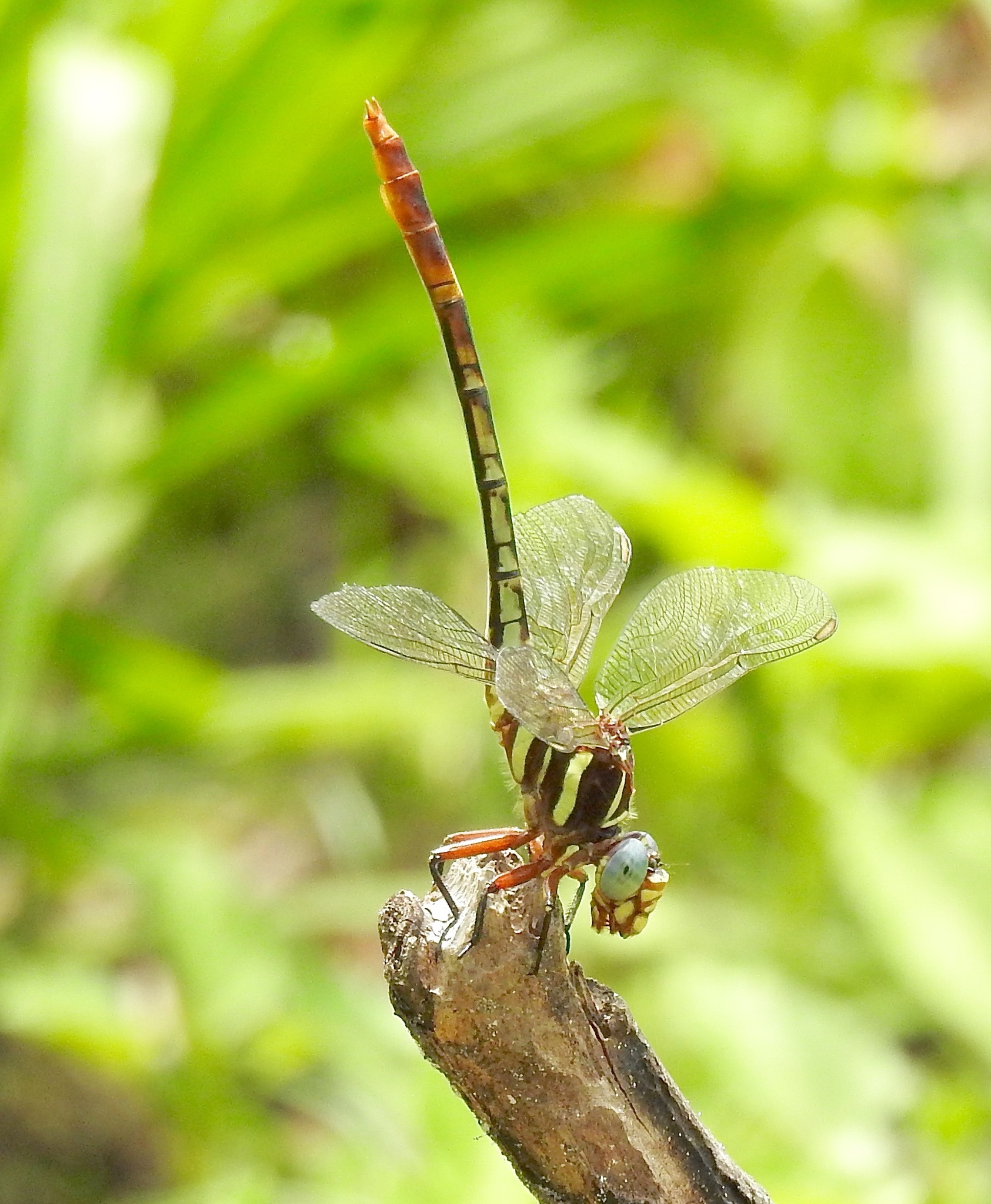
Female adult

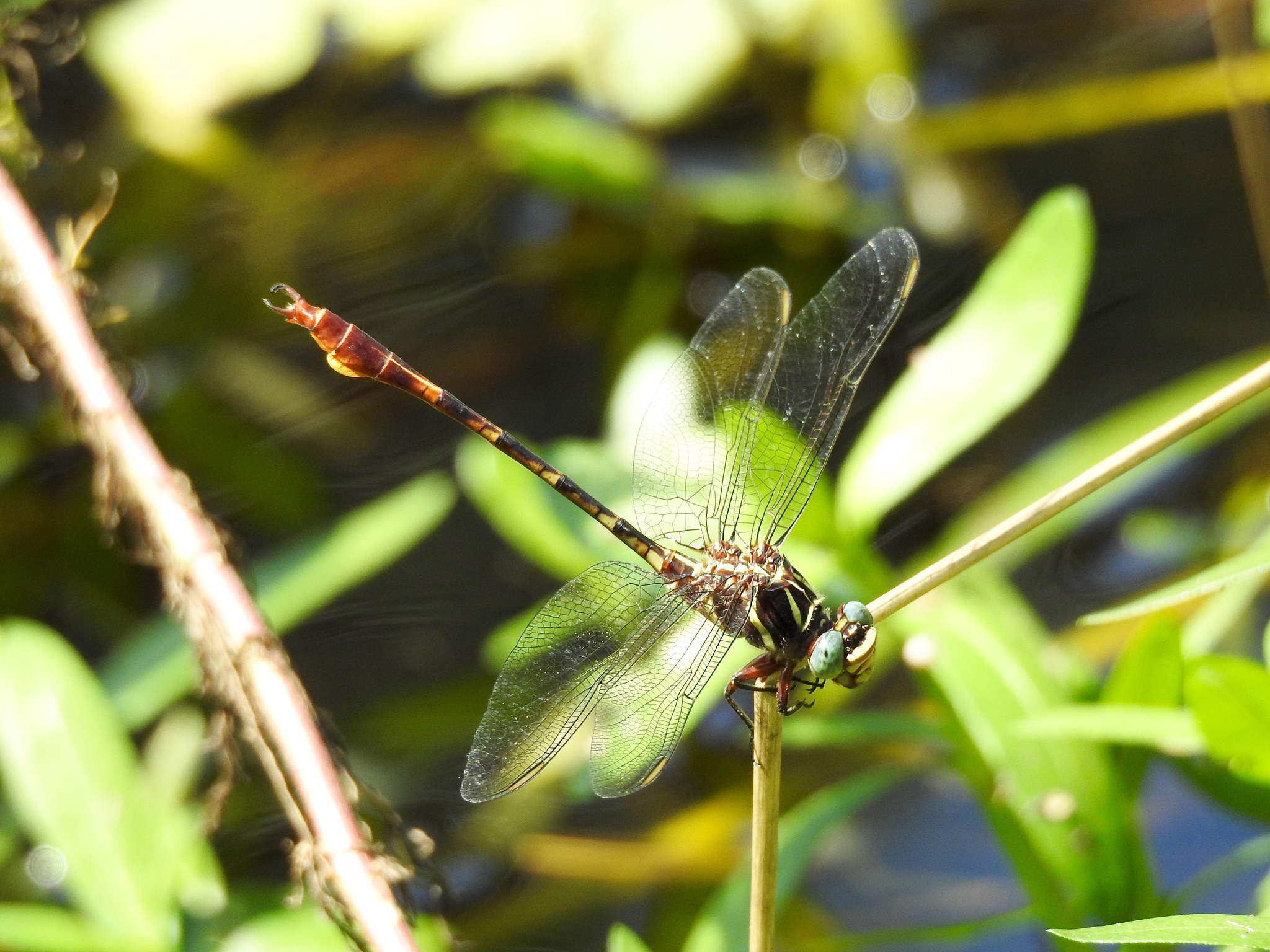
Male adult

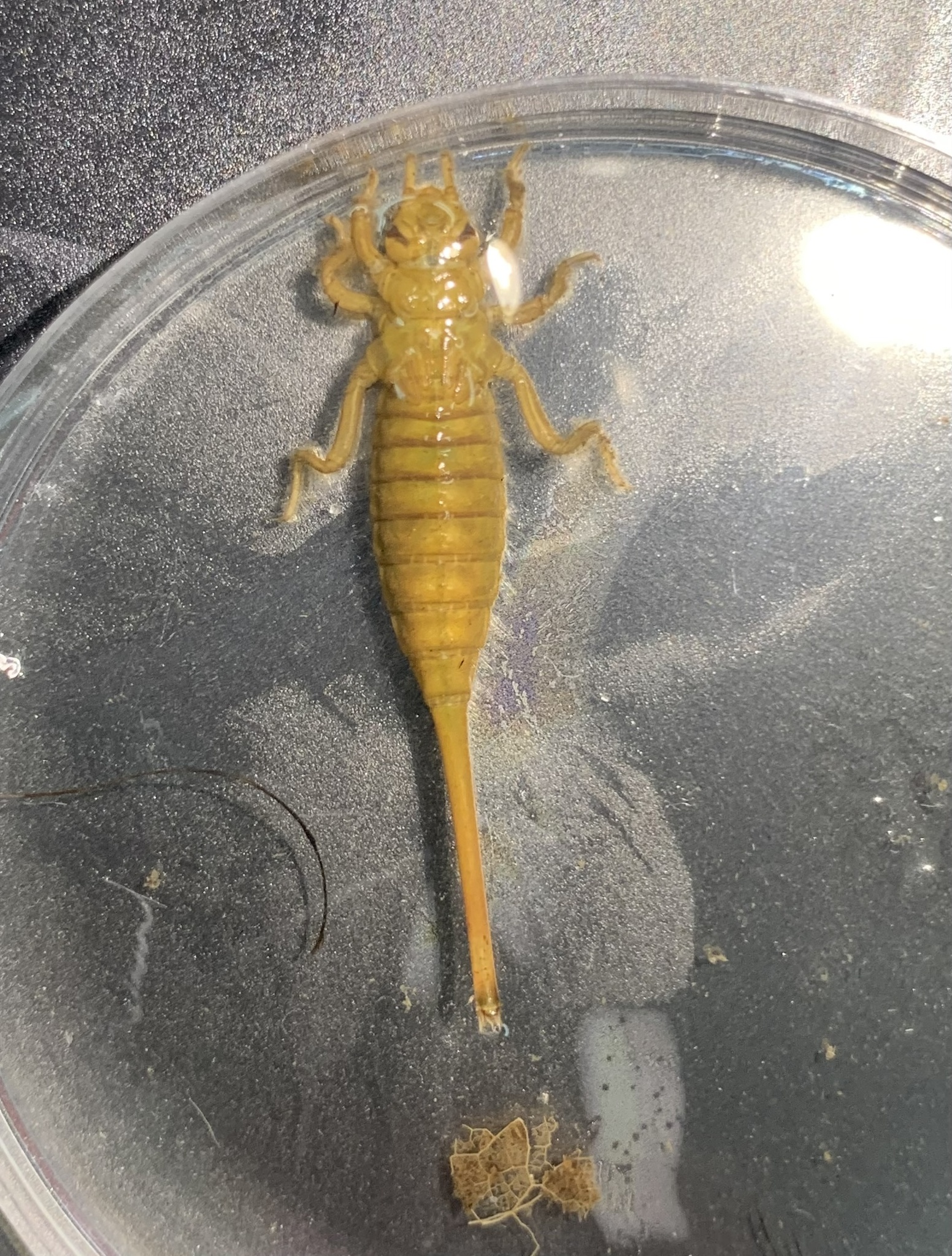
Nymph

== Etymology ==
The genus name Aphylla means "without leaf", referring to reduced flanges near the end of the abdomen. The specific epithet williamsoni is named for the American entomologist Edward Bruce Williamson.

The common name refers to the two stripes on the sides of the adult's thorax and the forcep-like shape of the adult male's cerci.

== Behavior ==
The adult commonly perches on vegetation at water's edge between patrols, where it flies with its abdomen slightly arched.

The species' oviposition varies, including tapping the water's surface and by dropping eggs from above.

== Distribution ==
The two-striped forceptail can be found in the southeastern United States, from Texas to Florida and north to Virginia. In North Carolina and Georgia, its range is expanding inland from the coast.

== Habitat ==
The two-striped forceptail inhabits slow streams and rivers, muck- or peat-bottomed canals, lakes, and ponds. These waters may be disturbed and are usually in full sun.
