= Manchester, Maine =

- Town
- Seal
- Motto: "The way life is!"
- Location in Kennebec County and the state of Maine.
- Coordinates: 44°19′52″N 69°52′34″W
- Country: United States
- State: Maine
- County: Kennebec
- Settled: 1775
- Incorporated (town): August 12, 1850

Area
  - Total: 22.62 sq mi (58.59 km^{2})
  - Land: 21.39 sq mi (55.40 km^{2})
  - Water: 1.23 sq mi (3.19 km^{2})
- Elevation: 256 ft (78 m)

Population (2020)
  - Total: 2,456
  - Density: 115/sq mi (44.3/km^{2})
- Time zone: UTC-5 (Eastern (EST))
  - Summer (DST): UTC-4 (EDT)
- ZIP code: 04351
- Area code: 207
- FIPS code: 23-43080
- GNIS feature ID: 582578
- Website: www.manchesterme.org

Manchester is a town in Kennebec County, Maine, United States. The population was 2,456 at the 2020 census. The southern part of the town bordering Cobbosseecontee Lake is a popular recreation spot in central Maine, and part of the Winthrop Lakes Region. Manchester is included in the Augusta, Maine micropolitan and included in the Lewiston-Auburn, Maine metropolitan New England City and Town Area.

== History ==
In the early 19th century, the town was known as "The Forks". The town was named Manchester after Manchester, Massachusetts.

== Geography ==
According to the United States Census Bureau, the town has a total area of 22.62 square miles (58.59 km^{2}), of which 21.39 square miles (55.40 km^{2}) is land and 1.23 square miles (3.19 km^{2}) is water. The town has shoreline on Cobbossecontee Lake, Cobbosseecontee Stream and Hutchinson Pond.

=== Bordering ===
Manchester borders the cities of Augusta and Hallowell and the town of Farmingdale to its east, the town of West Gardiner to its south, the towns of Withrop and Readfield to its west, and the towns of Belgrade and Sidney to the north.

== Demographics ==
Historical population
Census	Pop.	Note	%±
1860	813		—
1870	732		−10.0%
1880	623		−14.9%
1890	612		−1.8%
1900	518		−15.4%
1910	601		16.0%
1920	485		−19.3%
1930	492		1.4%
1940	626		27.2%
1950	664		6.1%
1960	1,068		60.8%
1970	1,331		24.6%
1980	1,949		46.4%
1990	2,099		7.7%
2000	2,465		17.4%
2010	2,580		4.7%
2020	2,456		−4.8%
U.S. Decennial Census

=== 2010 census ===
As of the census of 2010, there were 2,580 people, 1,044 households, and 761 families living in the town. The population density was 120.6 inhabitants per square mile (46.6/km^{2}). There were 1,255 housing units at an average density of 58.7 per square mile (22.7/km^{2}). The racial makeup of the town was 97.0% White, 0.3% African American, 0.3% Native American, 1.1% Asian, 0.1% from other races, and 1.2% from two or more races. Hispanic or Latino of any race were 0.5% of the population.

There were 1,044 households, of which 30.9% had children under the age of 18 living with them, 60.4% were married couples living together, 8.6% had a female householder with no husband present, 3.8% had a male householder with no wife present, and 27.1% were non-families. 19.5% of all households were made up of individuals, and 8.6% had someone living alone who was 65 years of age or older. The average household size was 2.47 and the average family size was 2.82.

The median age in the town was 46.2 years. 22.6% of residents were under the age of 18; 5.7% were between the ages of 18 and 24; 19.8% were from 25 to 44; 35.4% were from 45 to 64; and 16.5% were 65 years of age or older. The gender makeup of the town was 47.8% male and 52.2% female.

=== 2000 census ===
As of the census of 2000, there were 2,465 people, 977 households, and 733 families living in the town. The population density was 116.3 inhabitants per square mile (44.9/km^{2}). There were 1,181 housing units at an average density of 55.7 per square mile (21.5/km^{2}). The racial makeup of the town was 97.81% White, 0.04% African American, 0.24% Native American, 0.37% Asian, 0.04% from other races, and 1.50% from two or more races. Hispanic or Latino of any race were 0.41% of the population.

There were 977 households, out of which 34.9% had children under the age of 18 living with them, 64.5% were married couples living together, 7.9% had a female householder with no husband present, and 24.9% were non-families. 20.3% of all households were made up of individuals, and 9.2% had someone living alone who was 65 years of age or older. The average household size was 2.52 and the average family size was 2.90.

In the town, the population was spread out, with 24.8% under the age of 18, 5.2% from 18 to 24, 27.5% from 25 to 44, 27.4% from 45 to 64, and 15.1% who were 65 years of age or older. The median age was 42 years. For every 100 females there were 94.6 males. For every 100 females age 18 and over, there were 90.5 males.

The median income for a household in the town was $52,500, and the median income for a family was $59,048. Males had a median income of $43,269 versus $27,450 for females. The per capita income for the town was $28,043. About 1.8% of families and 2.5% of the population were below the poverty line, including 2.5% of those under age 18 and 2.2% of those age 65 or over.

== Notable people ==
- Shenna Bellows (born 1975), Secretary of State of Maine since 2021
- Laurie G. Lachance, President, Thomas College
- Samantha Smith (1972–1985), schoolgirl, peace activist and child actress
- Walter Wheeler (1925–2017), member of the Maine House of Representatives (2002–2010)
- Martha Wadsworth (1862-1943), early female entomologist focusing on Odonata
