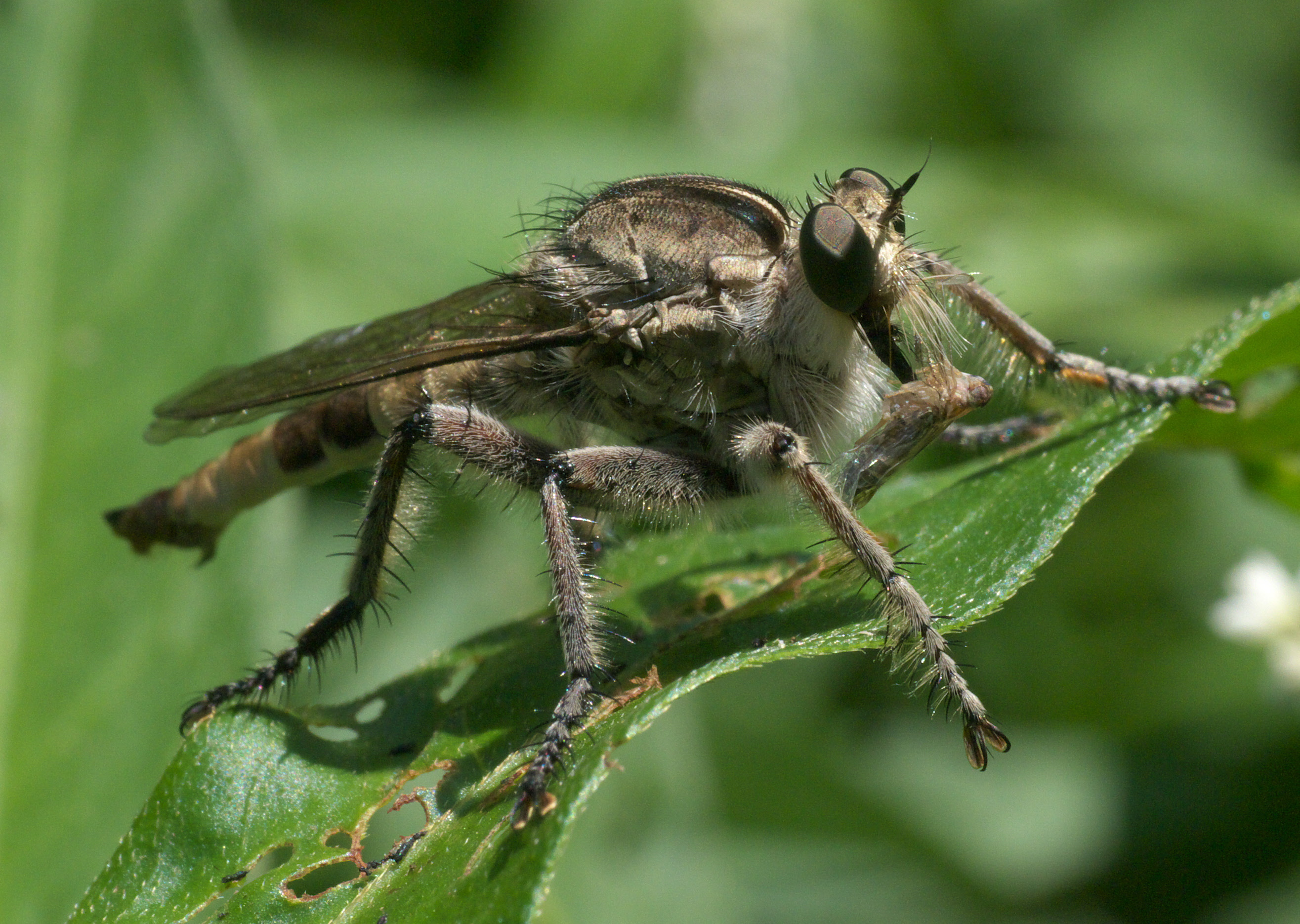
- Triorla interrupta

Scientific classification
- Kingdom: Animalia
- Phylum: Arthropoda
- Class: Insecta
- Order: Diptera
- Family: Asilidae
- Subfamily: Asilinae
- Genus: Triorla; Parks, 1968

= Triorla =

Genus of flies

Triorla is a genus of robber flies in the family Asilidae. There are about five described species in Triorla.

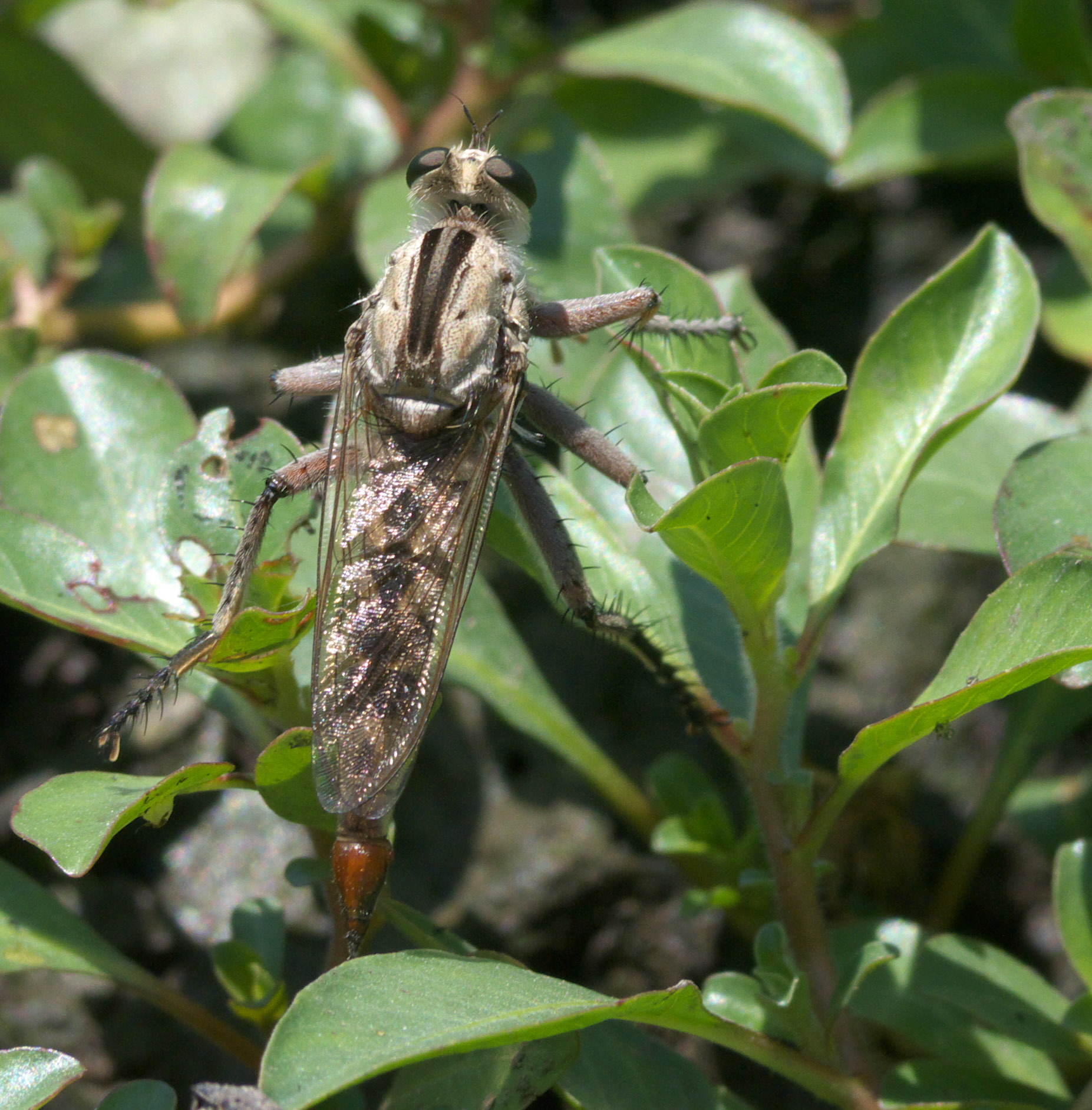
Triorla interrupta

== Species ==
These five species belong to the genus Triorla:

- Triorla interrupta (Macquart, 1834)^{i c g b}
- Triorla parastriola Pamplona & de Cima Aires, 1999^{c g}
- Triorla spinosa Tomasovic, 2002^{c g}
- Triorla striola (Fabricius, 1805)^{c g}
- Triorla trichinus Tomasovic, 2002^{c g}

Data sources: i = ITIS, c = Catalogue of Life, g = GBIF, b = Bugguide.net
