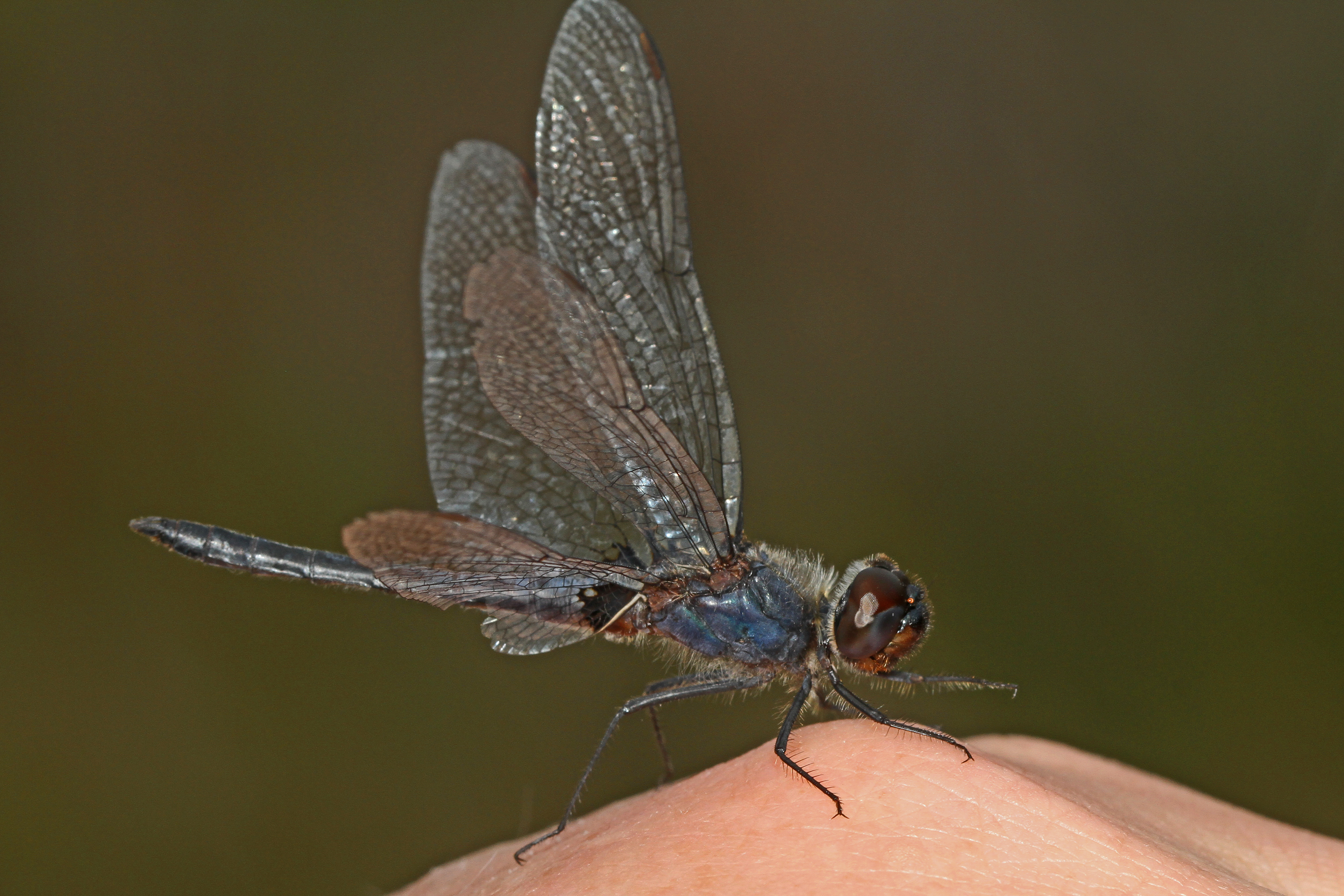

Scientific classification
- Kingdom: Animalia
- Phylum: Arthropoda
- Class: Insecta
- Order: Odonata
- Infraorder: Anisoptera
- Family: Libellulidae
- Genus: Celithemis
- Species: C. verna

Binomial name
- Celithemis verna Pritchard, 1935

= Celithemis verna =

Species of dragonfly

Celithemis verna, the double-ringed pennant, is a species of skimmer in the family Libellulidae. It is found in North America.

The IUCN conservation status of Celithemis verna is "LC", least concern, with no immediate threat to the species' survival. The population is stable.
