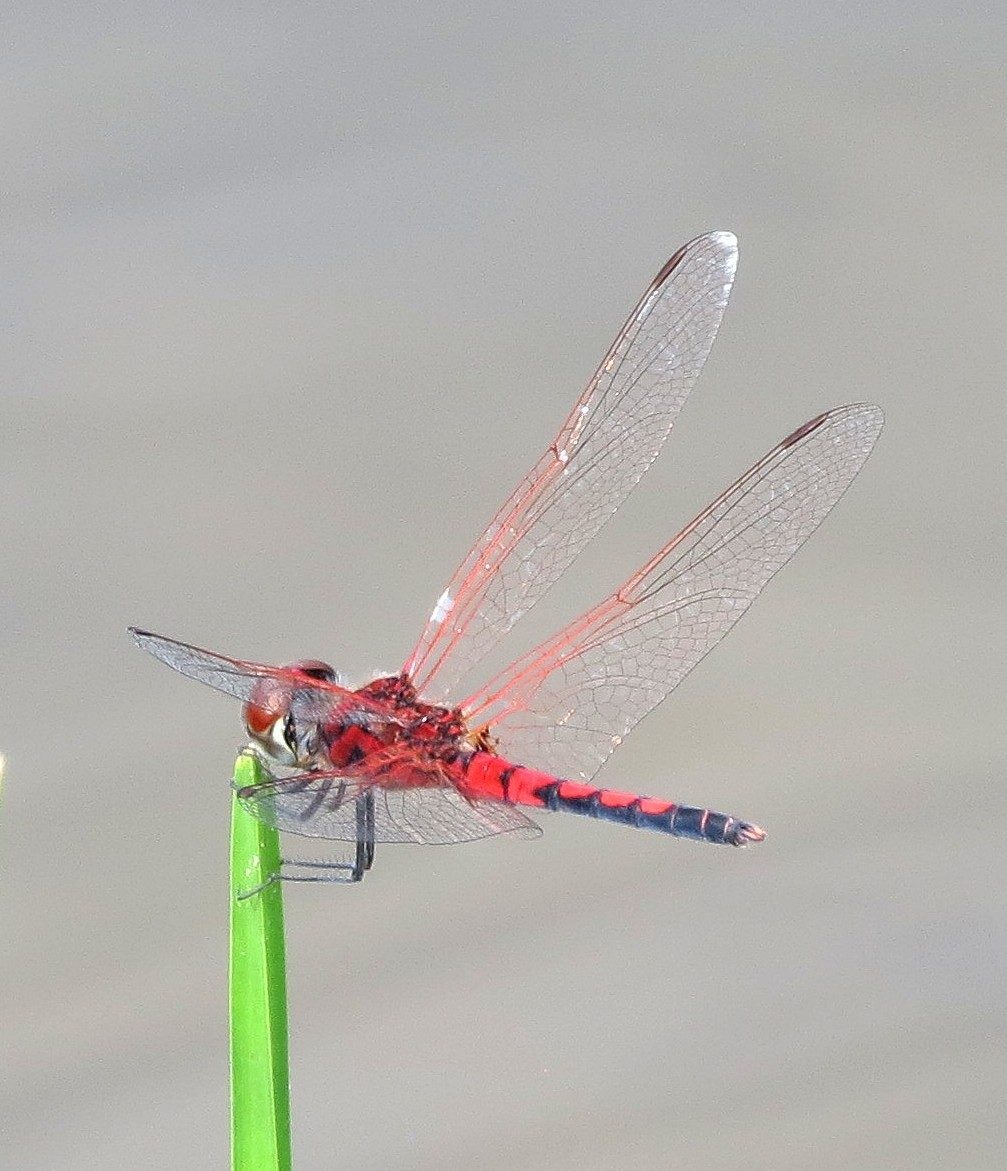

Conservation status
- Least Concern (IUCN 3.1)

Scientific classification
- Kingdom: Animalia
- Phylum: Arthropoda
- Class: Insecta
- Order: Odonata
- Infraorder: Anisoptera
- Family: Libellulidae
- Genus: Celithemis
- Species: C. bertha

Binomial name
- Celithemis bertha Williamson, 1922

Synonyms
- Celithemis leonora Westfall, 1952

= Celithemis bertha =

Species of dragonfly

Celithemis bertha, the red-veined pennant, is a species of skimmer in the dragonfly family Libellulidae. It is found in North America.

The IUCN conservation status of Celithemis bertha is "LC", least concern, with no immediate threat to the species' survival. The population is stable. The IUCN status was reviewed in 2017.
