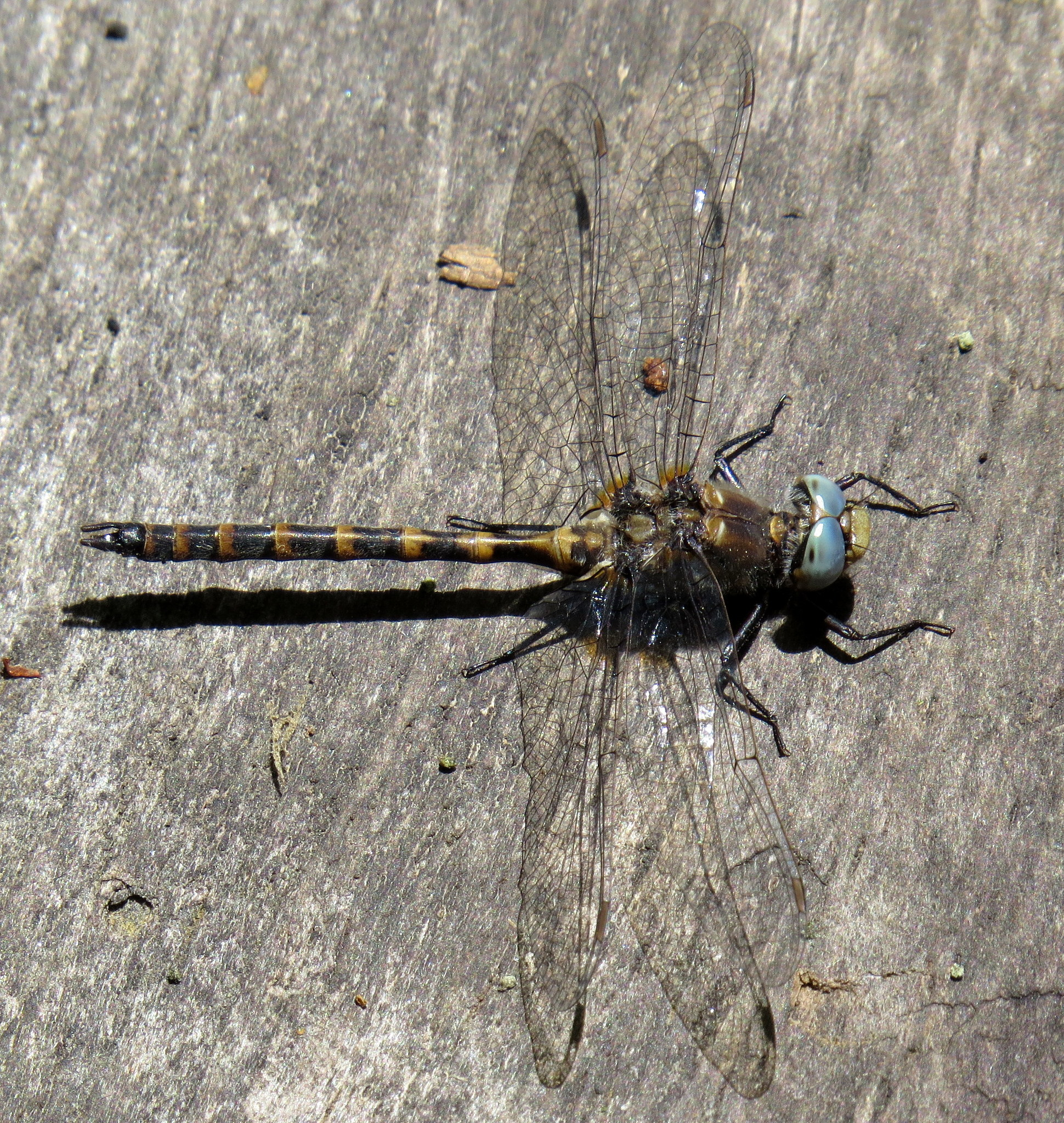

Conservation status
- Least Concern (IUCN 3.1)

Scientific classification
- Kingdom: Animalia
- Phylum: Arthropoda
- Class: Insecta
- Order: Odonata
- Infraorder: Anisoptera
- Family: Corduliidae
- Genus: Williamsonia
- Species: W. lintneri

Binomial name
- Williamsonia lintneri (Hagen in Selys, 1878)

Synonyms
- Cordulia linteri Hagen in Selys, 1878

= Williamsonia lintneri =

Species of dragonfly

Williamsonia lintneri, the ringed boghaunter, is a species of dragonfly in the emerald family (Corduliidae). It is found at acid bogs in the northeastern United States and southeastern Canada.

== Description ==
The adult ringed boghaunter is a small emerald, gray-black in overall colouration. The eyes are gray and yellow rings are present on each abdominal segment. The wings are clear except for a touch of yellow at the base. The female has a thicker abdomen than the male. The ringed boghaunter is readily distinguished from the related ebony boghaunter by the prominent yellow rings on the abdomen.

== Distribution ==
The ringed boghaunter has a restricted range, with populations known in Wisconsin, Michigan, New England, New York, and New Jersey. The species was previously thought to be endemic to the United States, but in 2016 was found at a location in Ontario.

== Life history ==
The adult ringed boghaunter is an early-flying species, primarily in May and June. It perches flat on the ground or on tree trunks, unlike other emeralds. Larvae are found in pools in acid wooded bogs, but adults are rarely seen breeding.
