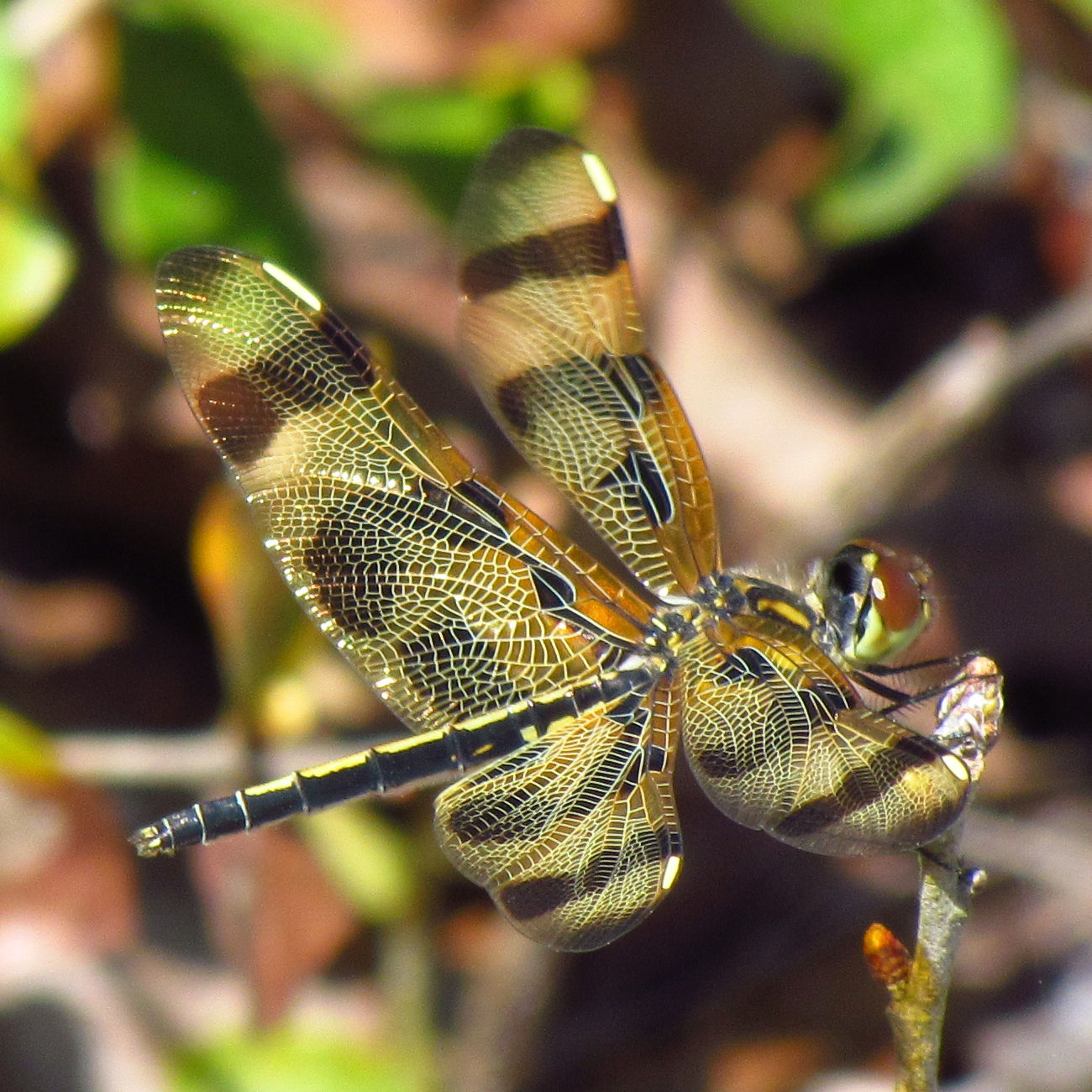
- Female

Conservation status
- Least Concern (IUCN 3.1)

- Secure (NatureServe)

Scientific classification
- Kingdom: Animalia
- Phylum: Arthropoda
- Class: Insecta
- Order: Odonata
- Infraorder: Anisoptera
- Family: Libellulidae
- Genus: Celithemis
- Species: C. fasciata

Binomial name
- Celithemis fasciata Kirby, 1889

= Celithemis fasciata =

Banded pennant

Species of dragonfly

Celithemis fasciata, commonly known as the banded pennant, is a species of dragonfly in the skimmer family. It is native to the United States, where it is found in the south-central, southeastern, and eastern regions.

The extensive, sharply defined black markings on its wings are distinctive, but the pattern varies considerably; individuals from the northern part of its range tend to have less wing coloration. It is about 33 mm (1.3 in) long.

It lives around ponds, lakes, and ditches.
