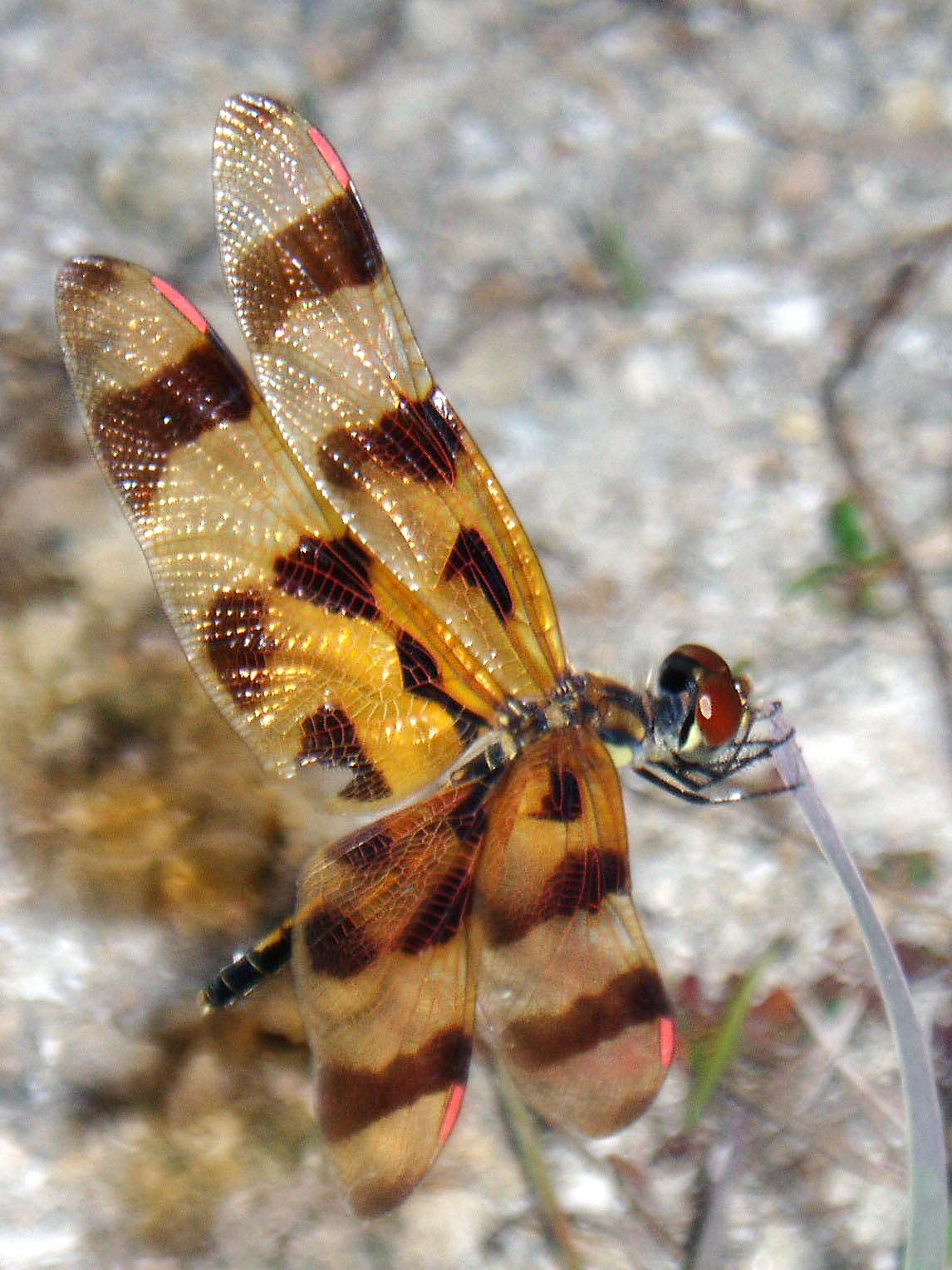
- Halloween pennant (C. eponina)

Scientific classification
- Kingdom: Animalia
- Phylum: Arthropoda
- Class: Insecta
- Order: Odonata
- Infraorder: Anisoptera
- Family: Libellulidae
- Subfamily: Leucorrhiniinae
- Genus: Celithemis; Hagen, 1861

= Celithemis =

Genus of dragonflies

Celithemis is a genus of dragonflies in the family Libellulidae. They are known commonly as pennants. There are eight species in this monophyletic genus. They are mainly distributed in eastern North America.

== Species ==
Species include:

Male	Female	Scientific name	Common name	Distribution
		Celithemis amanda (Hagen, 1861)	Amanda's pennant	southeastern United States
		Celithemis bertha Williamson, 1922	red-veined pennant	North America.
		Celithemis elisa (Hagen, 1861)	calico pennant	eastern Canada and eastern United States.
		Celithemis eponina (Drury, 1773)	Halloween pennant	eastern North America, including Ontario in Canada and the United States as far west as Colorado.
		Celithemis fasciata Kirby, 1889	banded pennant	United States
		Celithemis martha Williamson, 1922	Martha's pennant	North America
		Celithemis ornata (Rambur, 1842)	ornate pennant	Central America, North America, and South America
		Celithemis verna Pritchard, 1935	double-ringed pennant	North America.
