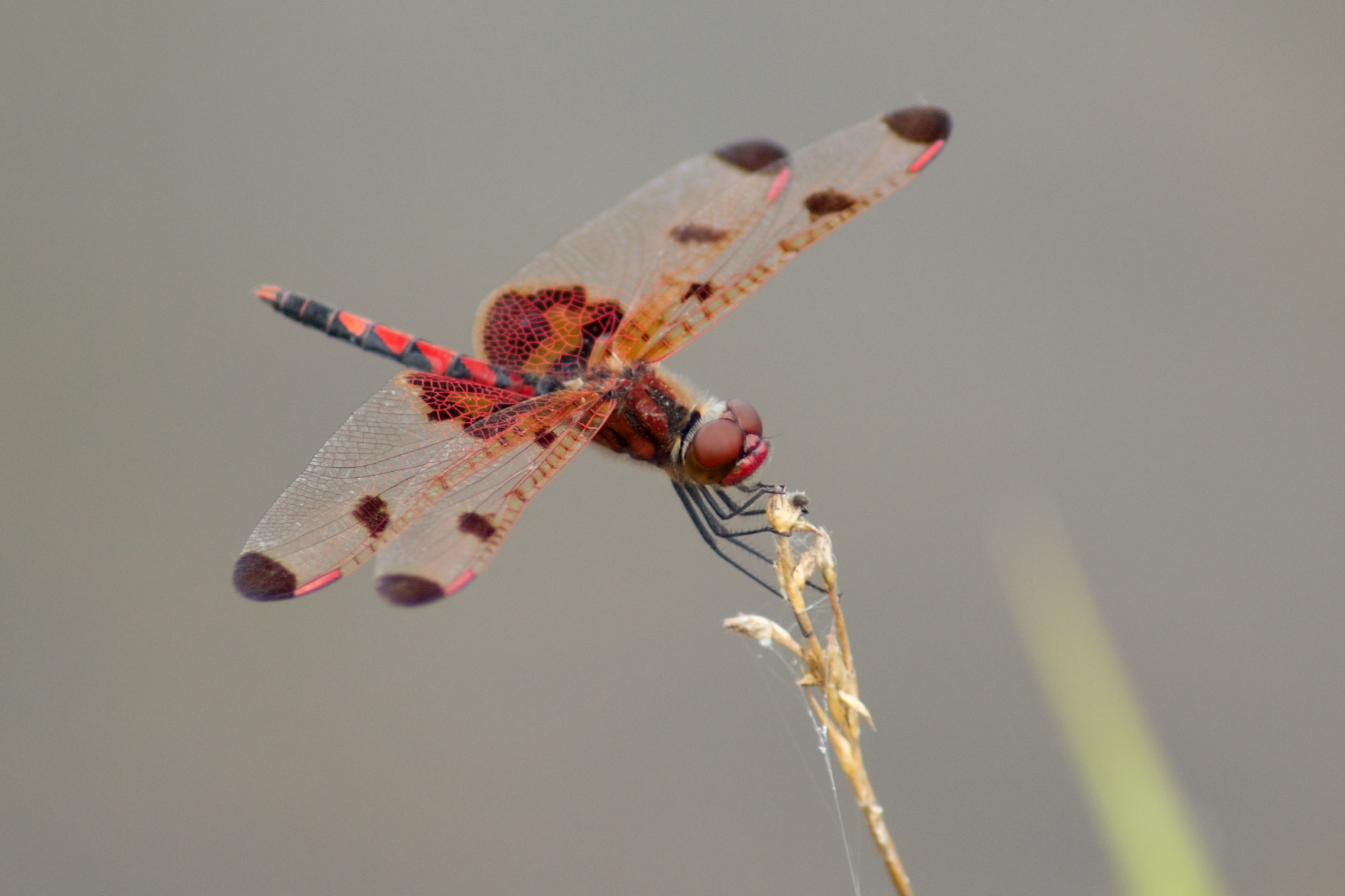
- male
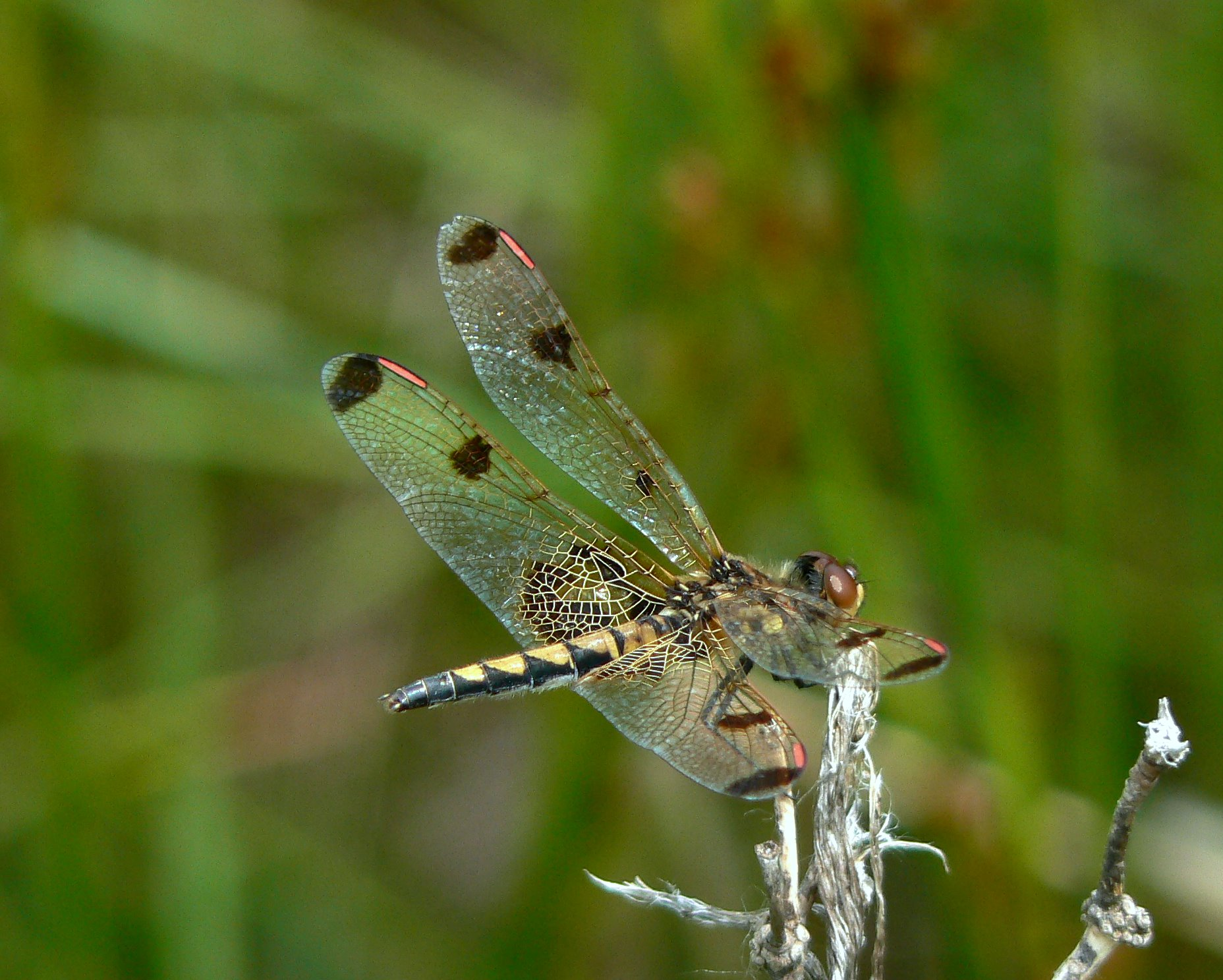
- female

Conservation status
- Secure (NatureServe)

Scientific classification
- Kingdom: Animalia
- Phylum: Arthropoda
- Clade: Pancrustacea
- Class: Insecta
- Order: Odonata
- Infraorder: Anisoptera
- Superfamily: Libelluloidea
- Family: Libellulidae
- Genus: Celithemis
- Species: C. elisa

Binomial name
- Celithemis elisa (Hagen, 1861)

= Celithemis elisa =

Species of dragonfly

The calico pennant (Celithemis elisa) is a species of dragonfly in the family Libellulidae. It is native to eastern Canada and eastern United States.

== Description ==
This dragonfly is 24 to 34 millimeters long, with a hindwing 25 to 30 millimeters long. It can be identified by the brown spots at the bases and tips of the wings. The pterostigma is yellow in younger individuals, and red in older. The face is yellow, turning red in older male specimens. The thorax is yellow-brown with a large dark stripe and several smaller brown stripes. The abdomen is dark with paler markings.

== Biology ==
This species lives near calm water bodies surrounded by vegetation. As larvae, this species feeds on small invertebrates, primarily water fleas and midges.
