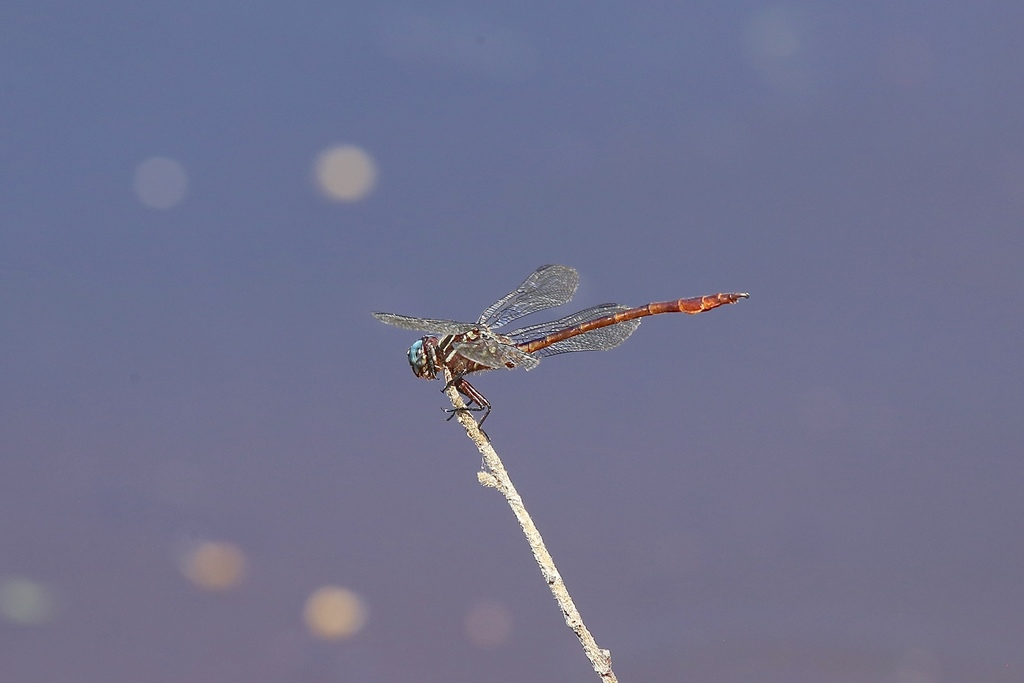

Conservation status
- Least Concern (IUCN 3.1)

Scientific classification
- Domain: Eukaryota
- Kingdom: Animalia
- Phylum: Arthropoda
- Class: Insecta
- Order: Odonata
- Infraorder: Anisoptera
- Family: Gomphidae
- Genus: Aphylla
- Species: A. protracta

Binomial name
- Aphylla protracta (Hagen in Selys, 1859)

= Aphylla protracta =

Species of insect

Aphylla protracta, the narrow-striped forceptail, is a species of clubtail in the family of dragonflies known as Gomphidae. It is found in Central America and North America.

The IUCN conservation status of Aphylla protracta is "LC", least concern, with no immediate threat to the species' survival. The population is stable.
