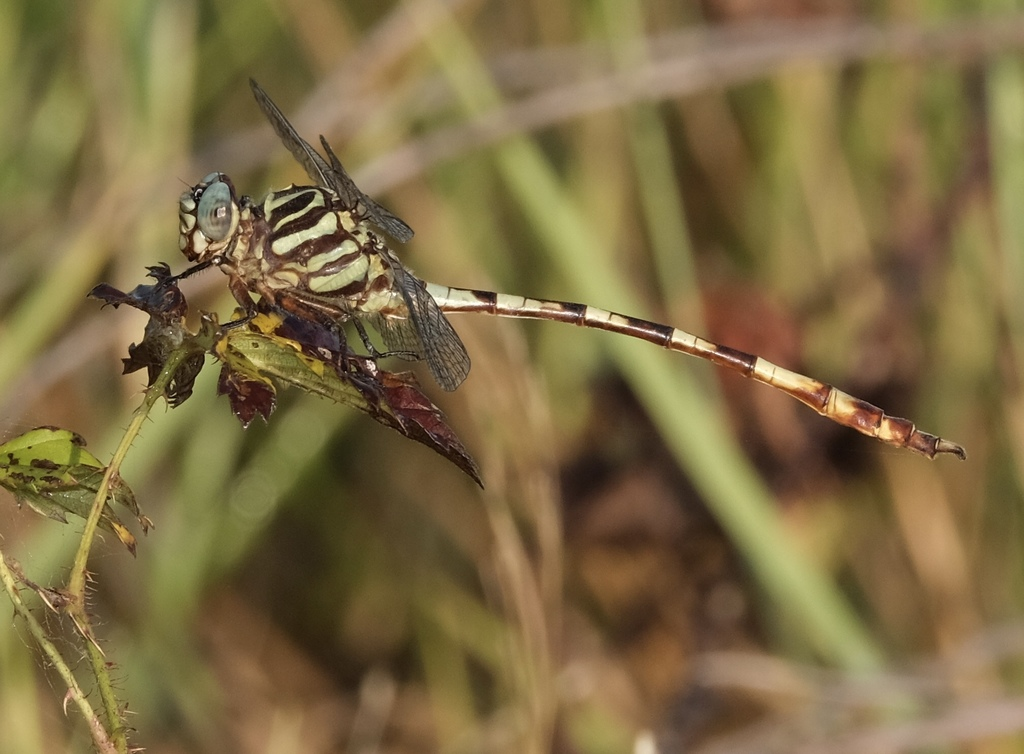

Conservation status
- Least Concern (IUCN 3.1)

Scientific classification
- Domain: Eukaryota
- Kingdom: Animalia
- Phylum: Arthropoda
- Class: Insecta
- Order: Odonata
- Infraorder: Anisoptera
- Family: Gomphidae
- Genus: Aphylla
- Species: A. angustifolia

Binomial name
- Aphylla angustifolia Garrison, 1986

= Aphylla angustifolia =

Species of dragonfly

Aphylla angustifolia, the broad-striped forceptail, is a species of clubtail in the family of dragonflies known as Gomphidae. It is found in Central America and North America.

The IUCN conservation status of Aphylla angustifolia is "LC", least concern, with no immediate threat to the species' survival.
