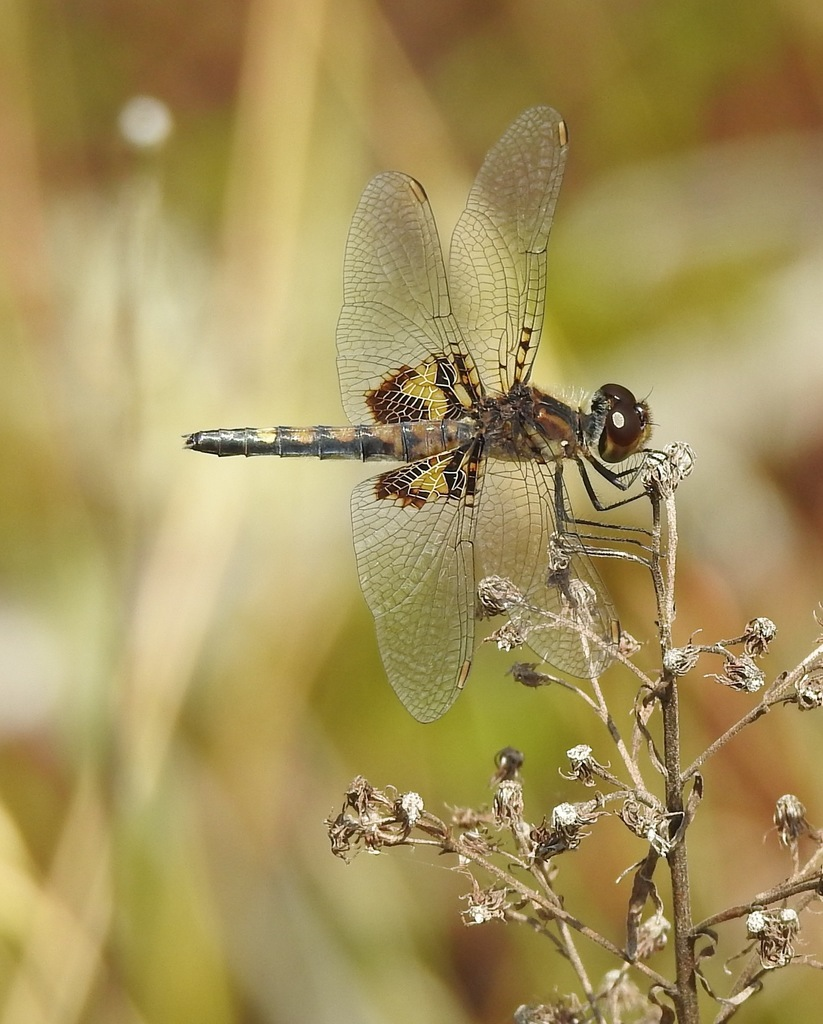

Conservation status
- Least Concern (IUCN 3.1)

Scientific classification
- Kingdom: Animalia
- Phylum: Arthropoda
- Class: Insecta
- Order: Odonata
- Infraorder: Anisoptera
- Family: Libellulidae
- Genus: Celithemis
- Species: C. martha

Binomial name
- Celithemis martha Williamson, 1922

= Celithemis martha =

Species of dragonfly

Celithemis martha, or Martha's pennant, is a species of skimmer in the dragonfly family Libellulidae. It is found in North America. This species is named in honor of entomologist Martha Wadsworth.

The IUCN conservation status of Celithemis martha is "LC", least concern, with no immediate threat to the species' survival. The population is stable. The IUCN status was reviewed in 2017.
