= John June Davis =

American professor of entomology

John June Davis (October 9, 1885 – July 13, 1965) was an American professor of entomology who worked at Purdue University from 1920 to 1956. He was responsible for promoting an interest in entomology through making the subject enjoyable. He was also an institutional organizer, involved in growing and establishing advanced entomology education at the university and working on collaborations between agricultural industry and research.

Davis was born in Centralia, Illinois, where he went to public schools. His uncle Arthur Snyder was a butterfly enthusiast who took Davis in summer into the Rockies on collecting trips. He enrolled at the University of Illinois and received a BS with a major in entomology in 1907. His thesis, under J.W. Folsom, was on aphids and he worked as an assistant to the State Entomology of Illinois, Stephen Alfred Forbes, for four years examining aphids and other greenhouse pests. In 1911 he joined the Bureau of Entomology of the United States Department of Agriculture working in Lafayette, Indiana, from 1911 to 1919 and then at Riverton, New Jersey. He took up a position as head of entomology at Purdue University in 1920. He taught introductory entomology for 36 years and developed the entomology program of the university, resulting in the establishment of the masters and PhD programs. He also established a permanent entomological collection which grew to nearly 500,000 specimens of about 15,000 species (500 type specimens) at the time of his retirement. He was succeeded as the head of the department by John Osmun.

Davis, known among his students and colleagues as "J.J.", was known for his inspiring teaching and organizational abilities. He organized several major conferences and was a fellow of the entomological society of America from 1917. He served on numerous entomology related committees. Following the introduction of Chinese mantids in West Lafayette, he organized children's education programs to collect and spread the mantis egg masses. He was also known for his use of humor and compiled The Entomologists' Jokebook (1937).

In 2017, a statue called The Entomologist, made by sculptor Susie Chisholm depicting Davis, Osmun, and Rachel Carson (in 1924, the three had met on the campus), was installed in Purdue University to celebrate 100 years of the department of entomology.
