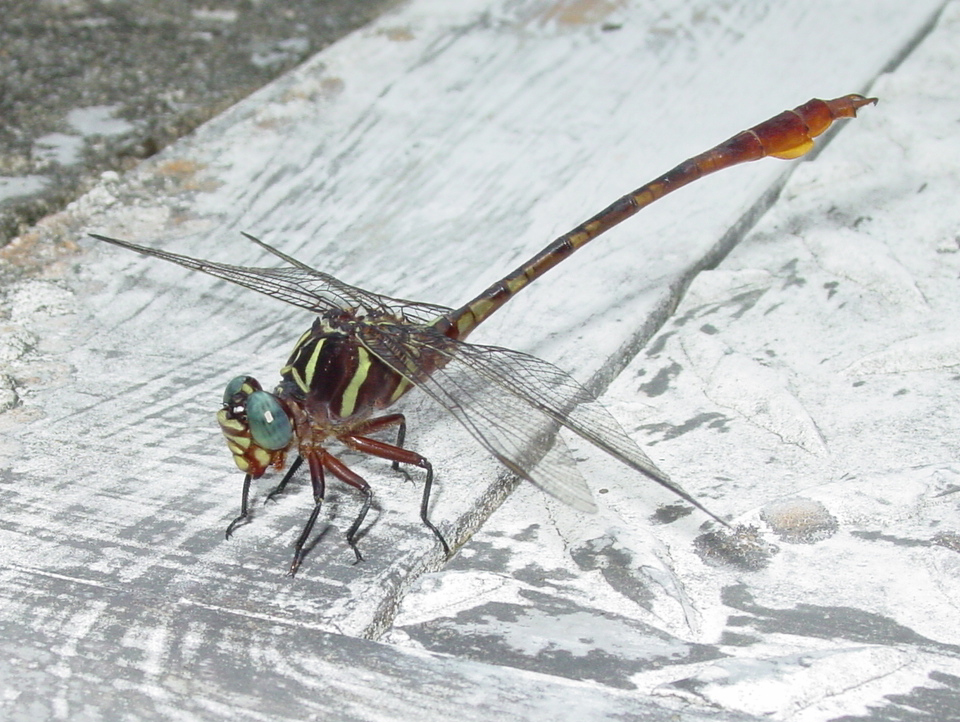

Scientific classification
- Kingdom: Animalia
- Phylum: Arthropoda
- Class: Insecta
- Order: Odonata
- Infraorder: Anisoptera
- Family: Gomphidae
- Genus: Aphylla; Selys, 1854

= Aphylla =

Genus of dragonflies

Aphylla is a widespread Neotropical genus of dragonflies of the Gomphidae family. They are commonly known as the greater forceptails because of their forceps-like cerci.

The genus contains the following species:

- Aphylla alia Calvert, 1948
- Aphylla angustifolia Garrison, 1986 – broad-striped forceptail
- Aphylla barbata Belle, 1994
- Aphylla boliviana Belle, 1972
- Aphylla brasiliensis Belle, 1970
- Aphylla brevipes Selys, 1854
- Aphylla caraiba Selys, 1854
- Aphylla caudalis Belle, 1987
- Aphylla dentata Selys, 1859
- Aphylla distinguenda (Campion, 1920)
- Aphylla edentata Selys, 1869
- Aphylla exilis Belle, 1994
- Aphylla janirae Belle, 1994
- Aphylla linea Belle, 1994
- Aphylla molossus Selys, 1869
- Aphylla producta Selys, 1854
- Aphylla protracta (Hagen in Selys, 1859) – narrow-striped forceptail
- Aphylla robusta Belle, 1976
- Aphylla scapula Belle, 1992
- Aphylla silvatica Belle, 1992
- Aphylla spinula Belle, 1992
- Aphylla tenuis Hagen in Selys, 1859
- Aphylla theodorina (Navás, 1933) – ringed forceptail
- Aphylla williamsoni (Gloyd, 1936) – two-striped forceptail
