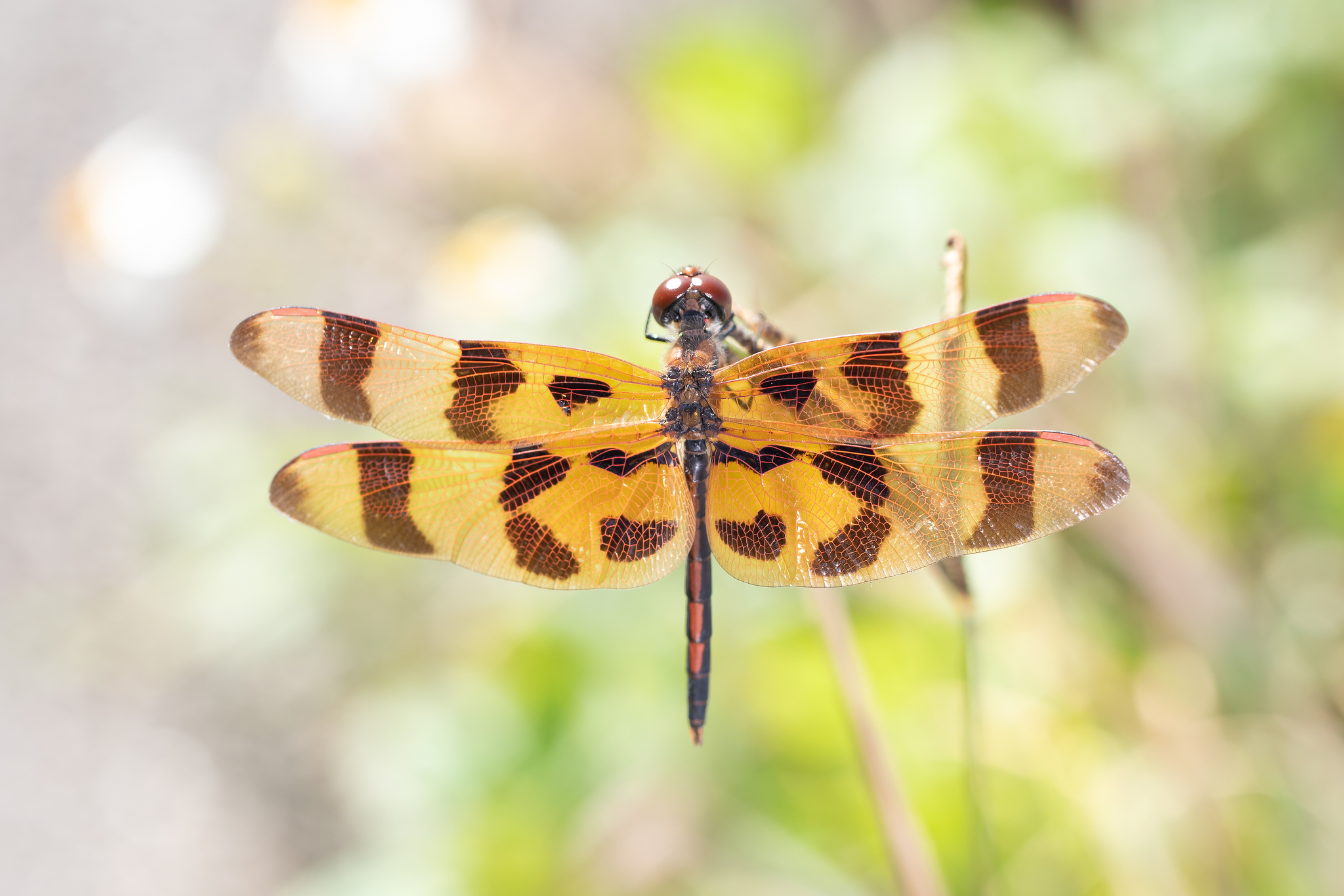
- Male
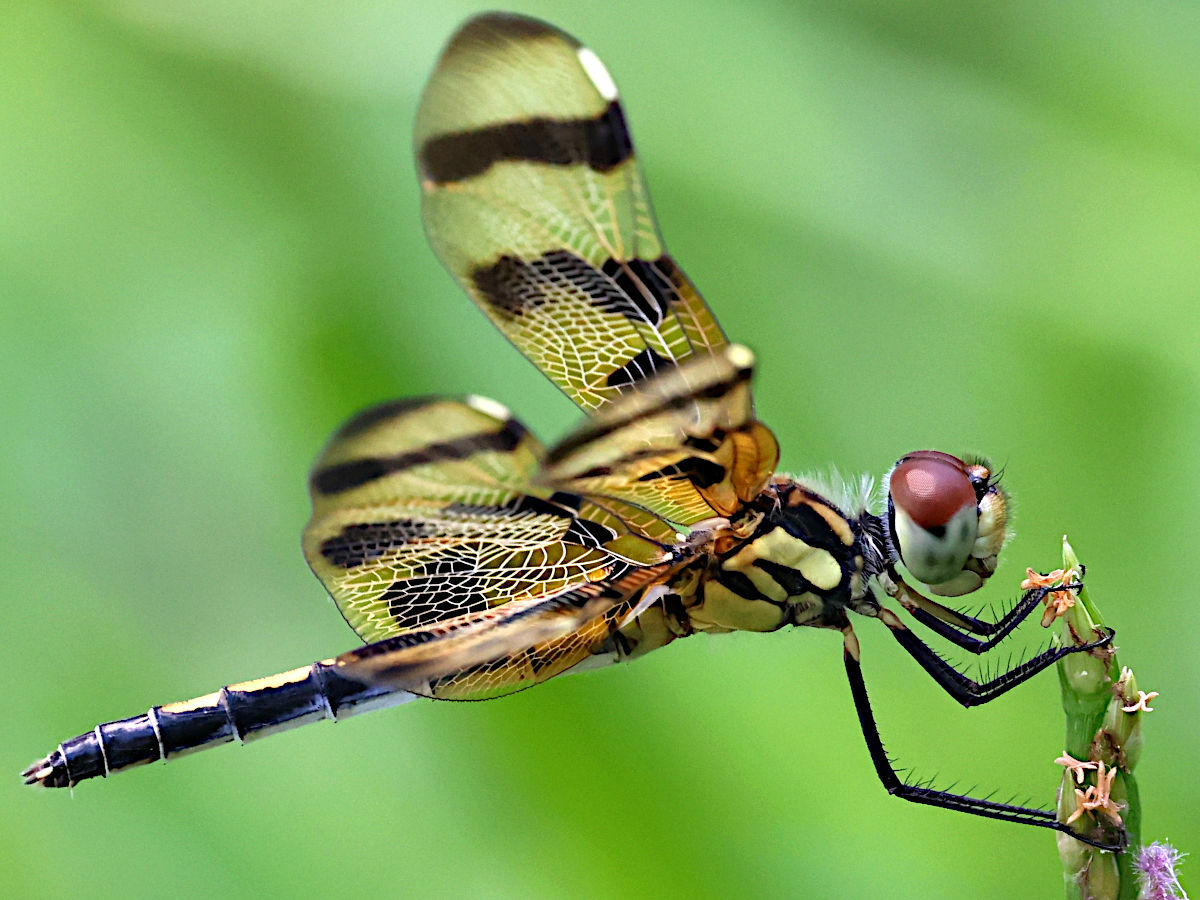
- Female

Conservation status
- Least Concern (IUCN 3.1)

- Secure (NatureServe)

Scientific classification
- Kingdom: Animalia
- Phylum: Arthropoda
- Class: Insecta
- Order: Odonata
- Infraorder: Anisoptera
- Family: Libellulidae
- Genus: Celithemis
- Species: C. eponina

Binomial name
- Celithemis eponina (Drury, 1773)

= Halloween pennant =

Species of dragonfly

The Halloween pennant (Celithemis eponina) is a species of dragonfly in the family Libellulidae. It is native to eastern North America, as well as the West Indies.

== Description ==
The Halloween pennant's wings are entirely orange-yellow in color with dark brown bands, the Halloween inspiration for its common name. Dragonflies of its genus perch at the tips of plants, waving in the breeze like pennants. The young has yellow markings, including a stripe on its back. The adult male and female may develop pale red markings, especially on the face. This species is about 38 to 42 millimetres (1.5 to 1.7 in) long.

== Distribution and habitat ==
This species occurs in eastern North America. In the southern part of its range of The Bahamas and Cuba, it is in season all year round. In northern latitudes it can be seen from mid-June to mid-August. It ranges as far north as southern Canada and as far west as the United States east of the Rocky Mountains, in New Mexico and Colorado. It lives in wet habitat types such as ponds, marshes and lakes, where it perches sometimes on vegetation.

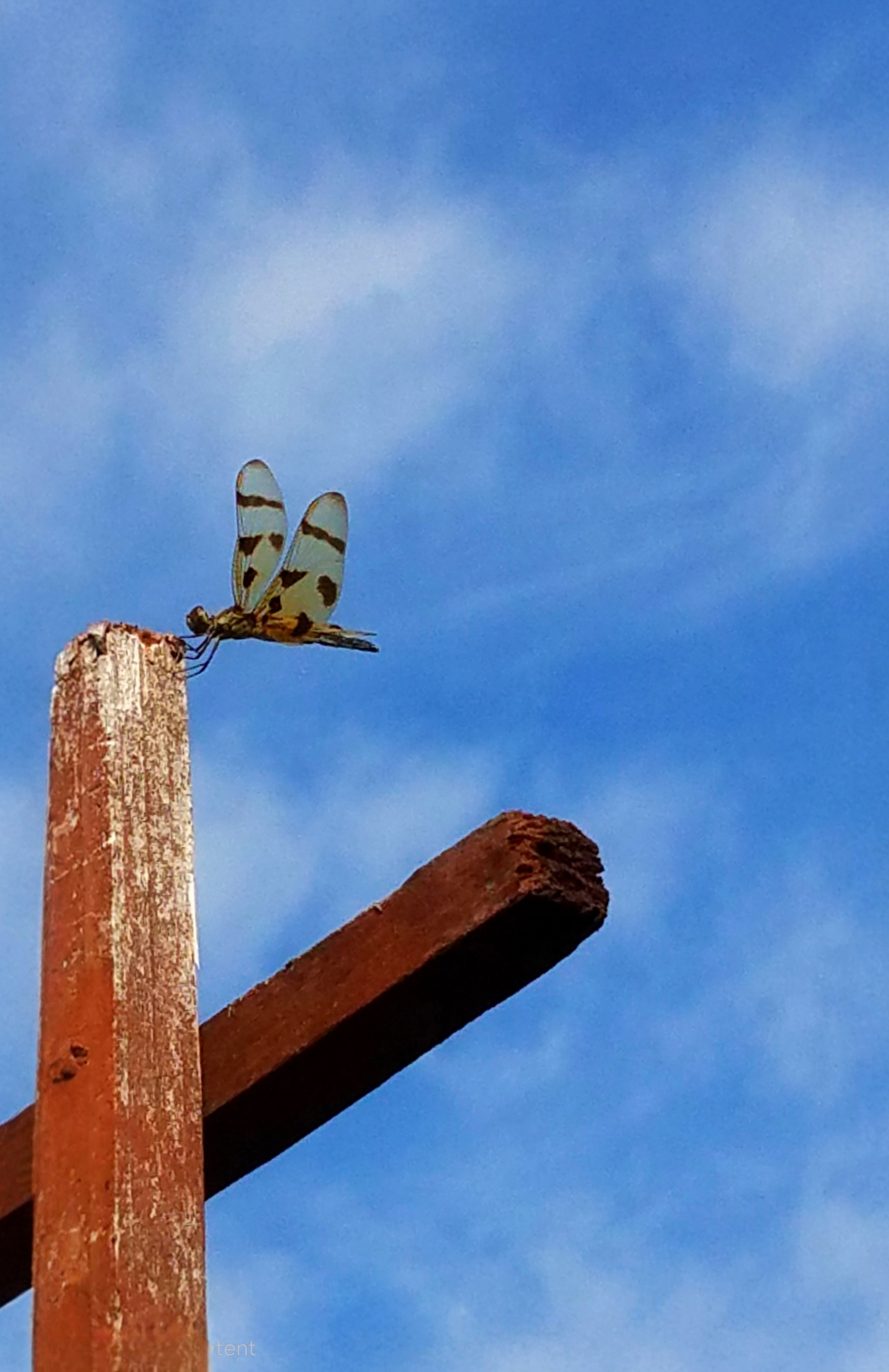
Halloween pennant perched on a post

== Biology ==
The female lays eggs in the morning on open water with the male still attached at the head. This method is known as exophytic egg laying. Sexual activity normally occurs between 8:00 and 10:30 am. Males rest on vegetation to await the females' arrival. This species is not territorial.

The Halloween pennant enjoys perching on top of tall grasses, on wooden posts, and at the very top of bushes and small trees, where they prefer bare twigs. If they find the location adequate, they will most commonly return many times.

The Halloween pennant feeds on other insects. It is able to fly in rain and strong wind. On hot days, it will often shade its thorax using its wings.

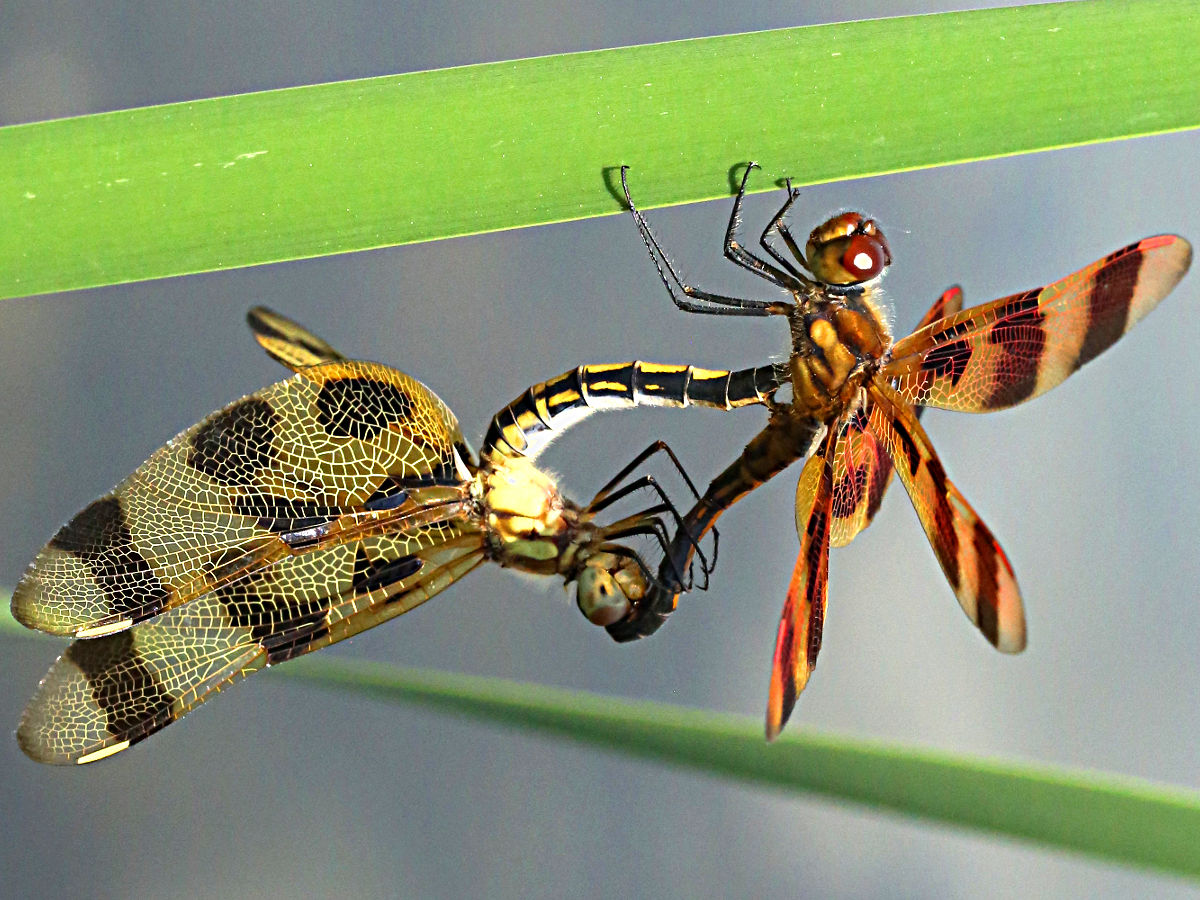
Mating wheel: female left, male right
