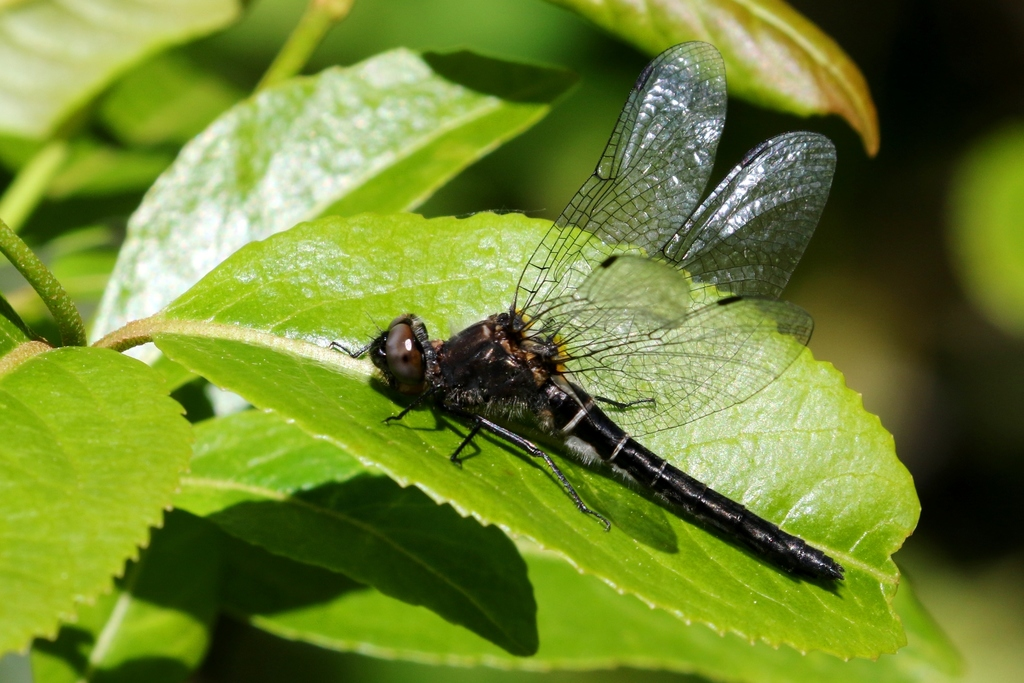
- Female

Conservation status
- Least Concern (IUCN 3.1)

Scientific classification
- Kingdom: Animalia
- Phylum: Arthropoda
- Class: Insecta
- Order: Odonata
- Infraorder: Anisoptera
- Family: Corduliidae
- Genus: Williamsonia
- Species: W. fletcheri

Binomial name
- Williamsonia fletcheri Williamson, 1923

= Williamsonia fletcheri =

Species of dragonfly

Williamsonia fletcheri, the ebony boghaunter, is a species of dragonfly in the emerald family Corduliidae. It is found in southeastern Canada and the northeastern United States. Larvae occur in acidic bogs.

== Taxonomy ==
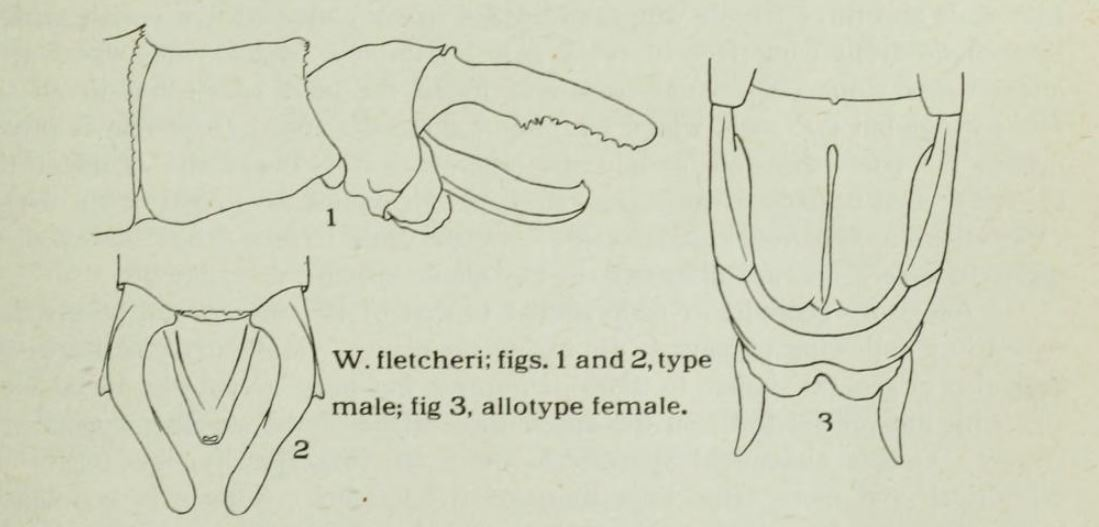
Illustration of Williamsonia fletcheri genitalia from original species description

The ebony boghaunter was first scientifically described in 1923 by American entomologist Edward Bruce Williamson based on 10 specimens collected in Mer Bleue Bog in Ottawa. The name fletcheri recognises Canadian entomologist James Fletcher, chosen by Williamson as the species was then known only from Canada. The genus Williamsonia had previously been named after Williamson in 1913.

The description of this species was the subject of some dispute between Williamson and American entomologist R. Heber Howe Jr. The dispute originated in the fact that two specimens of W. fletcheri from Manitoba had been given a name, but not described, in 1867 by German entomologist Hermann August Hagen. The two men disagreed as to what implications this had for a proper species description being published. Howe wanted to include a brief description of W. fletcheri in a paper about Williamsonia lintneri, using the name Hagen had proposed. This would, under the rules of zoological nomenclature, give permanent priority to that name. Williamson was simultaneously working on a full, detailed description of W. fletcheri, for which he intended to create a new name. Williamson eventually prevailed, which is why the species bears the name he created and why it has the author citation "Williamson".

== Description ==
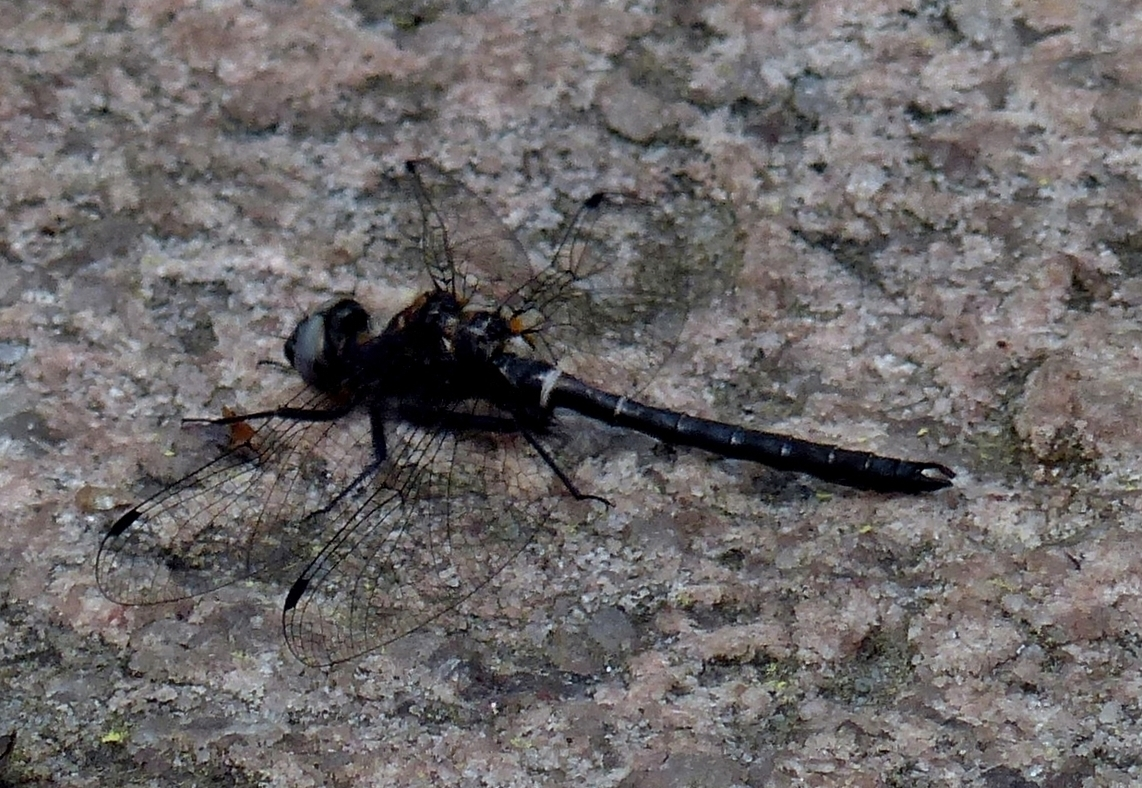
male

The ebony boghaunter is a small emerald, 29-35 mm long as an adult. The adult body is dark brown to black, with bright green eyes on males, duller on females. Several white rings are present at the base of the abdomen, and the wings are clear except for orange tinging at the base.

The larvae are about 16 mm long, and brown with a paler stripe down the back. The larvae are nearly identical to those of the closely related Williamsonia lintneri. Despite repeated efforts, the larvae were not first collected until 1985.

== Distribution ==
The ebony boghaunter has a narrow range, from Manitoba, eastern Minnesota and northern Wisconsin, through Michigan, northern New York, and central Ontario, and east to New England and southern portions of the Canadian Maritimes.

== Life history ==
Larvae are found in small pools in acidic bogs, typically surrounded by woodland and with abundant mosses. Males may be found at the breeding pools, although individuals and mating pairs are often found at some distance from the water. Adults fly very early in the season, typically in May and June.

Unlike other emerald species, but similar to Williamsonia lintneri, Williamsonia fletcheri often perches flat on the ground or on tree trunks.

== Conservation status ==
Williamsonia fletcheri is classified as "endangered" in Massachusetts. It is considered rare in most jurisdictions where it is found, including Manitoba, New Brunswick, Nova Scotia, Ontario, Quebec, Maine, Massachusetts, Michigan, New Hampshire, New York and Vermont.
