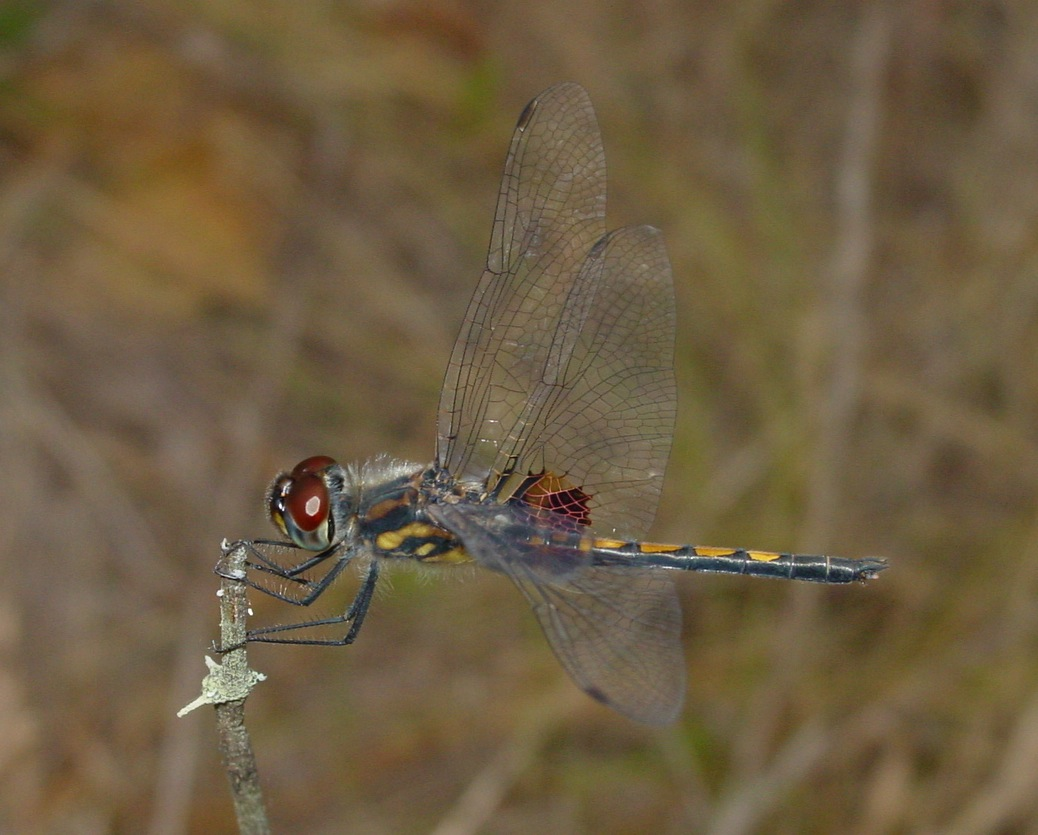

Conservation status
- Least Concern (IUCN 3.1)

Scientific classification
- Kingdom: Animalia
- Phylum: Arthropoda
- Class: Insecta
- Order: Odonata
- Infraorder: Anisoptera
- Family: Libellulidae
- Genus: Celithemis
- Species: C. ornata

Binomial name
- Celithemis ornata (Rambur, 1842)

= Celithemis ornata =

Species of dragonfly

Celithemis ornata, known generally as the ornate pennant or faded pennant, is a species of skimmer in the dragonfly family Libellulidae. It is found in Central America, North America, and South America.

The IUCN conservation status of Celithemis ornata is "LC", least concern, with no immediate threat to the species' survival. The population is stable. The IUCN status was reviewed in 2017.

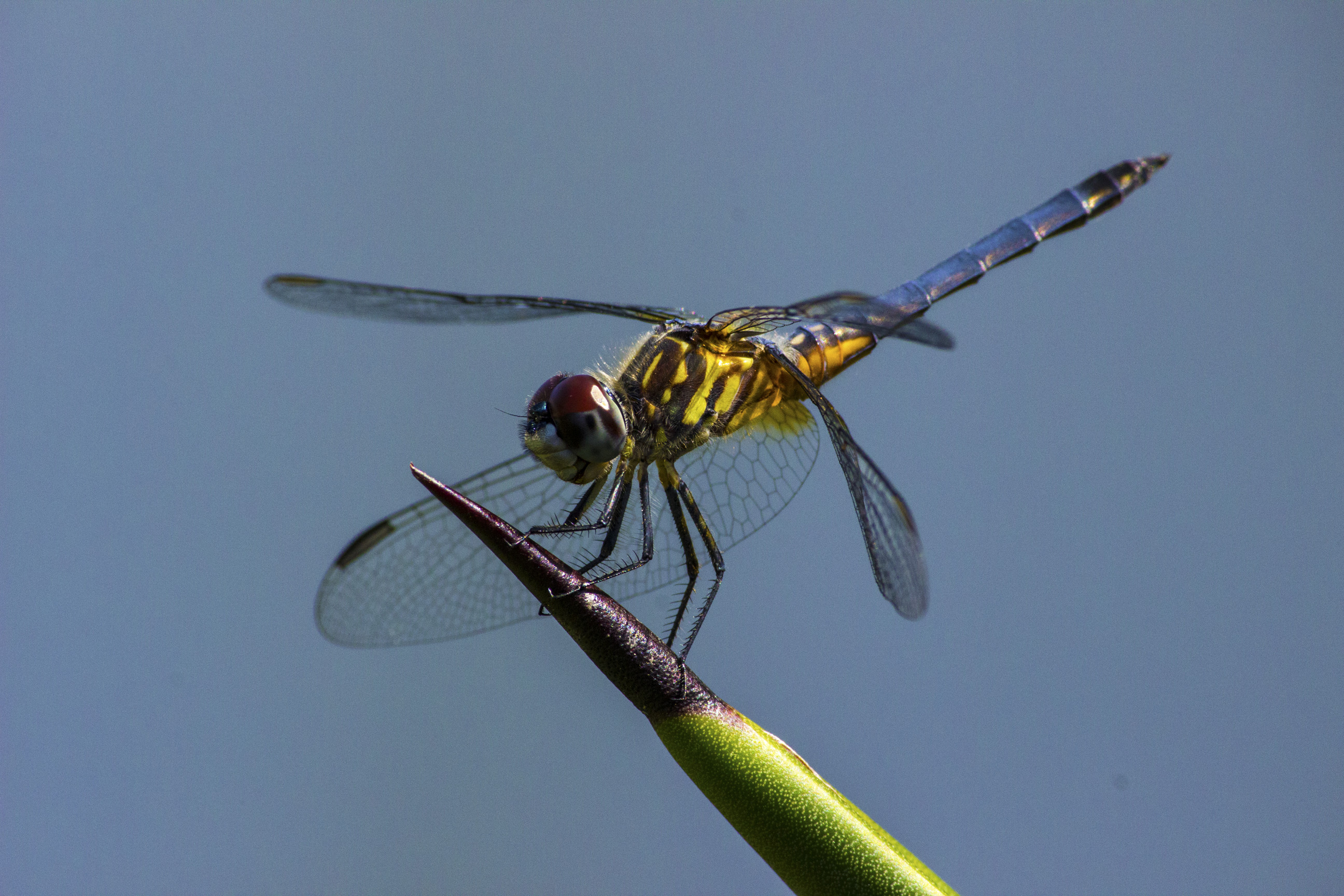
Ornate pennant, Celithemis ornata

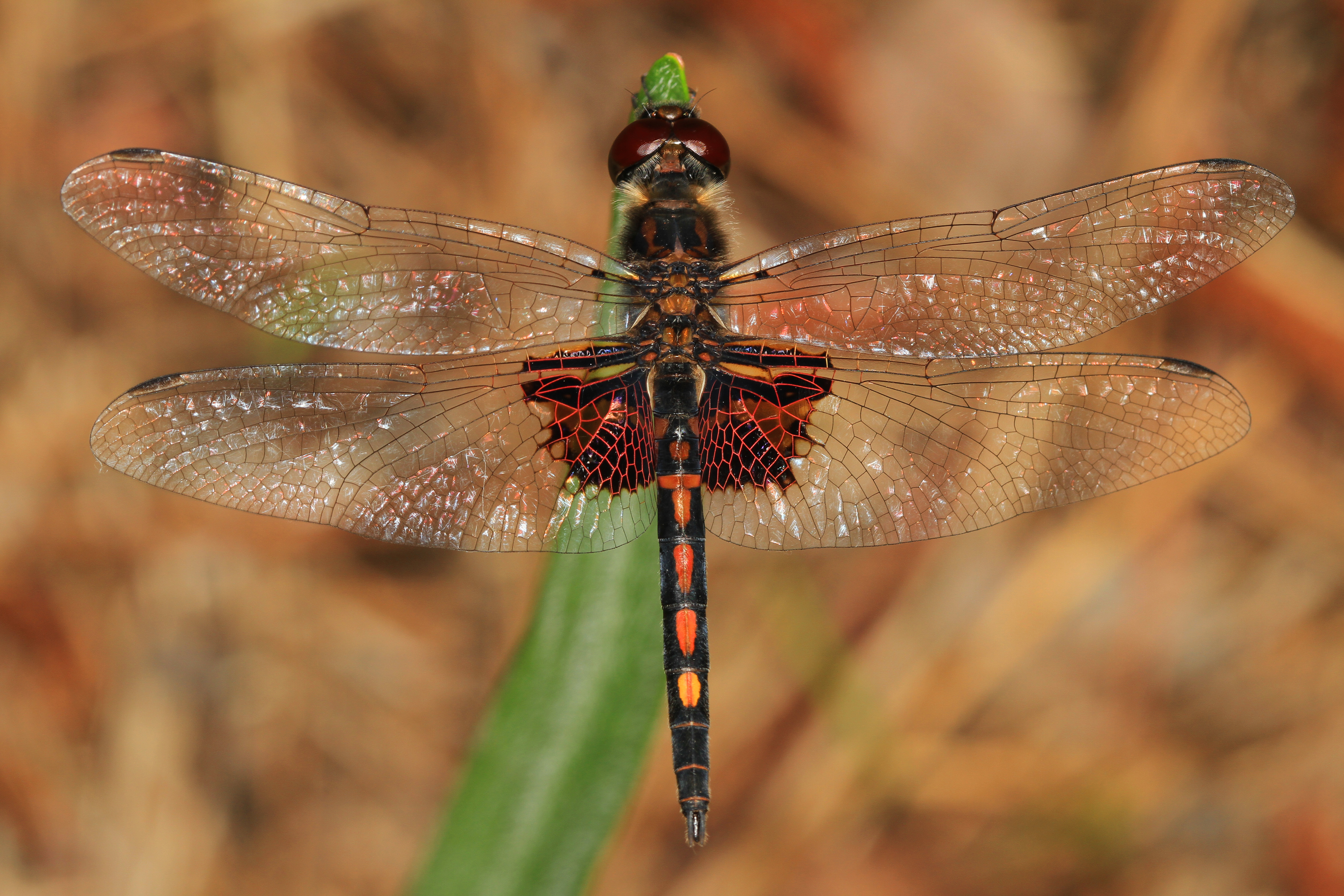
Ornate pennant, Celithemis ornata
