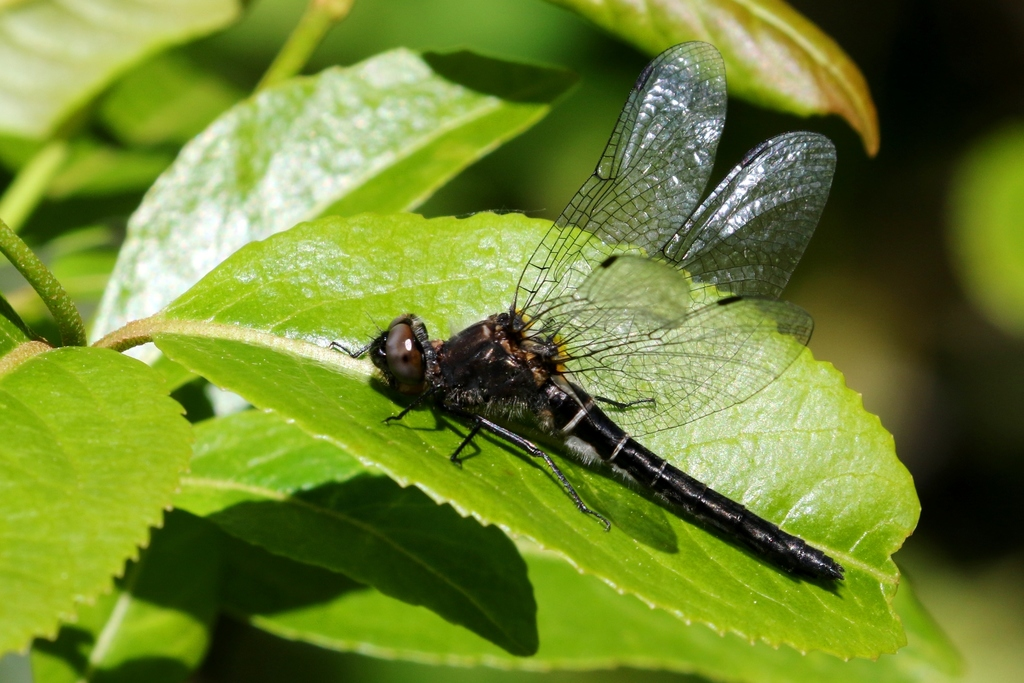
- Williamsonia fletcheri

Scientific classification
- Kingdom: Animalia
- Phylum: Arthropoda
- Class: Insecta
- Order: Odonata
- Infraorder: Anisoptera
- Family: Corduliidae
- Genus: Williamsonia; Davis, 1913

= Boghaunter =

Boghaunters

Genus of dragonflies

Williamsonia is a genus of small dragonflies in the family Corduliidae. They are commonly known as boghaunters. Unlike other genera of emerald dragonflies, they have dark eyes and nonmetallic bodies. The genus was established by entomologist William T. Davis and named after the American banker and amateur odonatologist Edward Bruce Williamson.

== Species ==
The genus consists of only two living species:

Image	Species	Distribution
	Williamsonia fletcheri Williamson, 1923 – ebony boghaunter	southeastern Canada and the northeastern United States.
	Williamsonia lintneri (Hagen in Selys, 1878) – ringed boghaunter	United States ( Wisconsin, Michigan, New England, New York, and New Jersey)
