= South Berwick Village Historic District =

Historic district in Maine, United States

- U.S. National Register of Historic Places
- U.S. Historic district
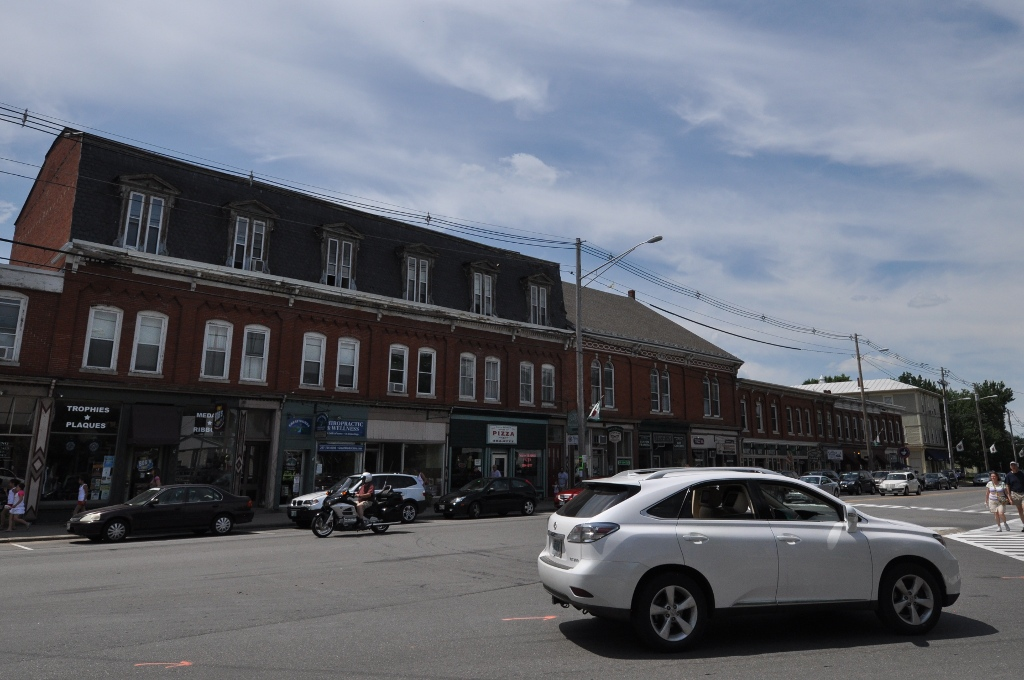
- Main Street in the village center

- Location within Maine Location within the United States
- Location: Portions of Main, Portland, Highland and Academy, South Berwick, Maine
- Coordinates: 43°13′57″N 70°48′31″W
- Area: 82 acres (33 ha)
- Built: 1805
- Architect: Hutchens & French; et al.
- Architectural style: Georgian, Federal
- NRHP reference No.: 10000058
- Added to NRHP: March 2, 2010

The South Berwick Village Historic District encompasses the historic village center of South Berwick, Maine. First settled in the 1640s, the village developed along a major route between Boston, Massachusetts and Portland, Maine in the early 19th century. The village has about 150 years of architecture reflective of this history, and was listed on the National Register of Historic Places in 2010.

== Description and history ==
The village center of the town of South Berwick is located near its northwestern corner, on a plateau above the Salmon Falls River, which separates it from Rollinsford, New Hampshire. This land was first purchased by European settlers from local Native Americans in 1643. Located near the head of navigation of the Salmon Falls River, its early development was near the river, as a port from which lumber for ship masts was shipped to England. The area known as "The Plains", where the present village is located, developed later, as the road between Boston, Portsmouth, and Portland became more important in the late 18th century. It became a stagecoach stop on this route, and the town center migrated to the north of the original river-oriented village. The town center was devastated by fire in 1845, destroying many wood-frame commercial buildings, and resulting in the construction of some of the early brick commercial buildings that still stand.

The district's main focus is the very center of the village, at the junction of Main Street (Maine State Route 236) and Portland Street (Maine State Route 4). It radiates north, south, and east along these roads, and includes short stretches of Academy Street, Highland Avenue, and Agamenticus Road. Prominent features include the series of commercial buildings on the west side of Main Street, the Sarah Orne Jewett House (a museum and National Historic Landmark) at the northeast corner of Main and Portland, and a small memorial park near the eastern end of the district on Portland Street. Churches mark the northern and southern ends of the district, including the Free Will Baptist Church at the north end of Main Street, and the Federated Church and Baptist Church at the southern end.

== See also ==
- National Register of Historic Places listings in York County, Maine
