= Punkintown =

Coordinates: 43.199034°N 70.794281°W

Punkintown (or Punkin Town), once known as Emerytown, Emery Town, or Emeryville, was a village situated at the corners of South Berwick, Eliot, and York, Maine from the 1800s through the early 1900s. At its peak, between seven and ten families gave the small town its population of somewhere between 30 and 40 people. The families operated sawmills, a granite quarry, and a gristmill. Its main water source was York Pond, which bordered the village to the north. The town was located on a main road connecting Dover, NH to York, ME. To this day, this part of Eliot is still referred to as the "Punkintown section."

== History ==
In 1693, Major Charles Frost and James Emery set up a water-powered sawmill on Stoney Brook, which is part of the York River in Eliot, Maine. John Heard acquired an interest in this mill, which he later deeded to son-in-law Captain Nathan Bartlett in 1725, who ended up with half of Stoney Brook and a one-third interest in the sawmill.

By the late 1700s Ebenezer Bartlett, great-grandson of Captain Nathan Bartlett, was running a mill on Stoney Brook.

As the mills became more productive, other families moved to Punkintown to find jobs. By the early 1800s, seven or eight families had built homes near the mills that supported them. The Ebenezer Plaisted house was by far the largest of these homes.

While the mills were in operation the town and its residents were prosperous. Due to advancing technology, the water-powered mills began closing down starting around 1850. By 1886 there were one gristmill and two sawmills along the west branch of the York River. Residents had already begun leaving. Those who stayed in Punkintown continued to make a living farming, harvesting wild berries, and taking on small jobs. Many of the tiny town's inhabitants often traveled to South Berwick to sell their goods near the rail lines. They grew their own food and tended their own land. They were self-sufficient and didn’t have any problems growing anything. Some of today's older, local residents still remember Punkintown's villagers coming to their homes to sell fruits and vegetables.

Punkintown's seven main families were the Plaisteds, Lords, Emerys, Simpsons, Paynes, Decoffs, and Wilsons. The Payne family consisted of three sisters, one of whom—the cross-eyed Emma Jane—was particularly notorious, known to have wandered around South Berwick until possibly as late as the 1960s. She'd walk for miles to sell produce from her garden, and was known as somewhat of a kleptomaniac. According to one local resident, "If she sold something to you, chances are good that it came from your garden!”

A period of hard times in the early 20th century was the beginning of the end for Punkintown. The Sherburne mill closed in 1915. A forest fire in 1916 claimed several of Punkintown's homes and many of the trees. A tuberculosis outbreak in 1922 accelerated the decline, and the last of the dilapidated buildings was taken by another fire that same year.

== Punkintown Today ==
Still in evidence today are the foundations, or "cellar holes," of several houses that were once home to some of Punkintown's former inhabitants. At the outlet of York Pond, at its southern tip, four of the foundations are still evident. According to the York County Map of 1856, the homes that sat on these foundations belonged to Ebenezer Plaisted, E. Emery, J. Emery, and W. Simpson. The Ebenezer Plaisted house was built sometime before 1800. Just south of the outlet by upper Bartlett Mill Pond (the rookery), granite posts support iron pipes that enclose a small graveyard containing the headstones of several families, including the Plaisteds, Emerys, and Lords.

In 1985 a team of researchers from the University of New Hampshire did their best to piece together Punkintown's history. The team found eight cellar holes, two water holes, the remains of a dam, a wheel used in a sawmill, and various pathways, roads, and stone walls. They also located two graveyards, tons of cut rock, and several rock quarries.

Though Punkintown road is no longer passable, about 1000' of the South Berwick end is still in use today. It terminates at Route 236 where it serves a few families and one small business. Eliot preserved a much longer stretch of road, about 3400', which is home to about a dozen Eliot families. From the Eliot end, the old Punkintown village is accessible only by foot or non-motorized bicycle via a narrow wooden footbridge that passes over the outlet of York Pond. Some motor vehicle access is possible from the South Berwick end with a four wheel drive truck.

Bartlett Hill on the 1856 Map of York County is now home to a set of antenna towers for cellular telephone companies and WSHK-FM Kittery.

== Today ==
To date, no significant efforts have been made to preserve the artifacts in the area, though some have recently been recovered.

In 1995, with the help of the Great Works Regional Land Trust, the town of Eliot purchased part of the land that was once Punkintown from the estate of Frank Parsons, which owned all of the land at that time. Punkintown is now part of the Eliot Town Forest.

The Great Works Regional Land Trust has purchased several parcels abutting Punkintown, which will keep it out of the hands of developers.

== Notable Citizens ==
Major Charles Frost (1631-1697)
