= Paul Family Farm =

Historic house in Maine, United States

- U.S. National Register of Historic Places
- U.S. Historic district
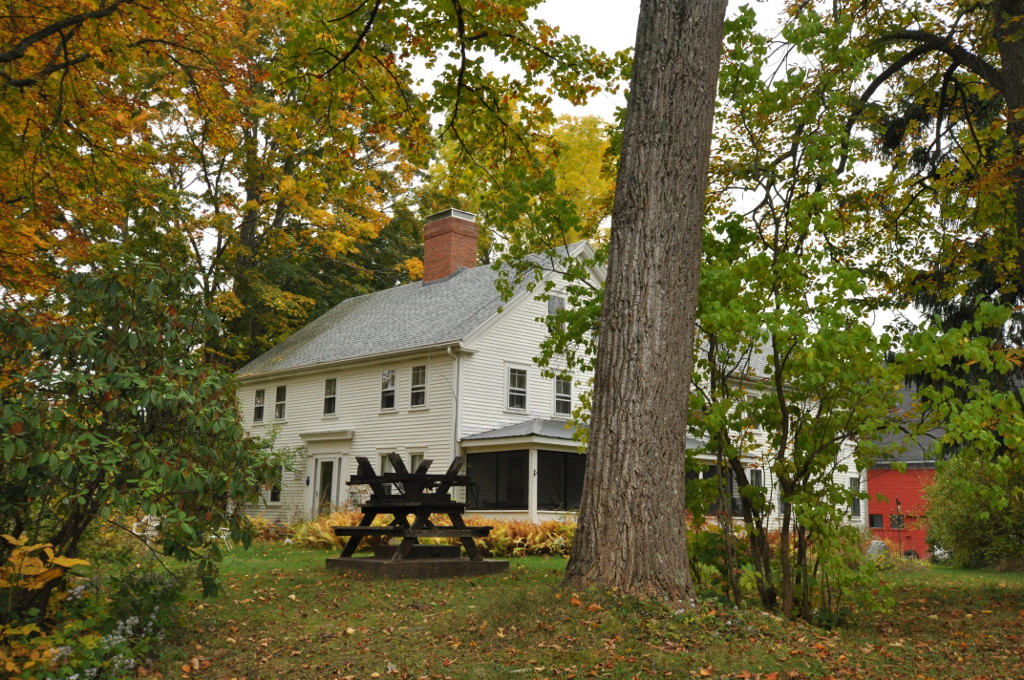

- Location within Maine Location within the United States
- Location: 106 Depot Rd., Eliot, Maine
- Coordinates: 43°9′28″N 70°47′23″W
- Area: 19 acres (7.7 ha)
- Built: 1830
- Architectural style: Federal
- MPS: Eliot, Maine MPS
- NRHP reference No.: 98001232
- Added to NRHP: October 20, 1998

The Paul Family Farm is a historic farmstead at 106 Depot Road in Eliot, Maine. Consisting of a well-preserved early-19th century Federal style farmhouse and a small collection of early-20th century outbuildings, it is a representative example of 19th-century farming in the area. The farmhouse parlor is further notable for the c. 1820s stencilwork on its walls. The property was listed on the National Register of Historic Places in 1998.

== Description and history ==
The Paul Family Farm is located at the southern corner of Depot Road and Goodwin Road (Maine State Route 101), in a rural area northeast of the Eliot village center. The main house is a 2 1/2-story wood-frame structure, five bays wide, with a side-gable roof, central chimney, and clapboard siding. The front, facing east toward Goodwin Road, is symmetrically arranged, with a center entrance that has a Greek Revival surround with sidelight windows, pilasters, and corniced entablature. A hip-roof porch extends across most of the northern facade, and there is a two-story ell extending westward. The interior of the main block follows a typical center-chimney plan, with a small vestibule and winding staircase in front of the chimney, hall and parlor on either side, and the kitchen behind the chimney. The parlor is finished with wide wainscoting and plaster above, with a Federal style fireplace mantel with pilasters. The walls have been decorated with stencilwork characterized as being of the "Eaton School", similar to the work of itinerant artist Moses Eaton, Jr. This stencilwork was touched up during major work in the 1920s (which included the ell), and is signed by Martin Frost, a local artist of that period.

The house's initial construction date is traditionally given as 1804–05. It was probably built by Hugh Tucker Paul, the son of Moses Paul, who first settled the land. The farmstead was still in the hands of Paul's descendants at the time of its listing on the National Register in 1998. Moses N. Paul was responsible for the addition of the ell in the 1920s, along with most of the outbuildings of the farmstead except for its c. 1850 barn, which include a woodshed, workshop, garage, and arbor. He also added a chicken coop in the 1960s.

== See also ==
- National Register of Historic Places listings in York County, Maine
