= Maine State Route 103 =

State highway in York County, Maine, US

State Route 103

Route information
- Maintained by MaineDOT
- Length: 16.33 mi (26.28 km)
- Existed: 1929–present

Major junctions
- West end: SR 236 near Eliot
- US 1 in Kittery
- East end: US 1A at York Harbor

Location
- Country: United States
- State: Maine
- Counties: York

Highway system
- Maine State Highway System; Interstate; US; State; Auto trails; Lettered highways
← SR 102A	→ SR 104

State Route 103 (SR 103) is a 16.3-mile (26.2 km) long state highway in extreme southern Maine. The route is signed east–west, but forms a half-loop, with most of its western segment running strongly southeast slightly inland of the Piscataqua River and the state border with New Hampshire, its central skirting the Piscataqua generally easterly, and its eastern strongly northeast slightly inland from the Atlantic Ocean. The route piggybacks on different roads with many turns throughout its length.

== Route description ==
SR 103 begins in the west at an intersection with SR 236 (which is itself a former alignment of SR 103 there) west of Eliot, near its intersection with SR 101 just southwest of the border between South Berwick and Dover, New Hampshire. For its first mile SR 103 heads south-southwest, until crosses Sturgeon Creek, a tidal inlet of the Piscataqua River, the state border with New Hampshire. There it turns southeast to parallel the river, meandering slightly inland southeast through Eliot and into Kittery, which it enters on the causeway over Spinney Creek, which divides the two towns there. SR 103's first intersection is two-thirds of a mile later at Dennett Road, where it T's right and passes underneath U.S. Route 1 Bypass. SR 103 continues southeast, intersecting US 1 just north of the Memorial Bridge connecting Kittery with Portsmouth, New Hampshire. Continuing east, SR 103 meets SR 236 at its southern terminus. There it wends eastward along the outer harbor of the Piscataqua through historic Kittery Point before veering northeast at Gerrish Island toward York. SR 103 crosses the York River near York Harbor, and ends at US 1A southeast of downtown York.

Access to I-95 North is possible via local connections to exits 1, 2, and 3.

== History ==
SR 103 has existed since the New England road marking system was in place, as early as 1929. It ran from Route 9 in Berwick (along what is now SR 236) to its current alignment and on to York. In 1940 it was extended into York Village to, what was at the time, State Route 1 (a designation that was removed in 1949). Once stretching over 26 miles (42 km), SR 103 was truncated in 1957 to its current alignment, with the old alignment north of Eliot designated as SR 236. SR 236 was itself routed parallel to SR 103 south of the intersection, and terminates at SR 103 in Kittery.

== Junction list ==
The entire route is in York County.

Location	mi	km	Destinations	Notes
Eliot	0.00	0.00	SR 236 (Harold L. Dow Highway) to SR 101 – Eliot, South Berwick	Western terminus
Kittery	7.7	12.4	To US 1 Byp. – Kittery, Portsmouth, NH	Access via Bridge Street
Kittery	8.0	12.9	US 1 (State Road) to I-95 – Kittery, Portsmouth, NH	
Kittery	8.9	14.3	SR 236 north (Shapleigh Road) to I-95 / US 1 – Eliot	Southern terminus of SR 236
York	16.33	26.28	US 1A (York Street) to US 1 – York	Eastern terminus
1.000 mi = 1.609 km; 1.000 km = 0.621 mi
