= Maine State Route 91 =

State highway in York County, Maine, US

State Route 91

Route information
- Maintained by MaineDOT
- Length: 7.83 mi (12.60 km)
- Existed: 1949–present

Major junctions
- South end: US 1 in York
- North end: SR 236 in South Berwick

Location
- Country: United States
- State: Maine
- Counties: York

Highway system
- Maine State Highway System; Interstate; US; State; Auto trails; Lettered highways
← SR 90	→ SR 92

State Route 91 (SR 91) is a short state highway in southwestern Maine. It runs for 7.83 miles (12.60 km), connecting the towns of South Berwick and York.

== Route description ==
SR 91 begins at an intersection with U.S. Route 1 (US 1) in York. The highway proceeds out of town to the northwest towards South Berwick, just nicking the corner of Eliot along the way. The first three miles (4.8 km) of the route follow the York River towards South Berwick. SR 91 passes under Interstate 95 (the Maine Turnpike) without an interchange, then has its northern terminus at SR 236.

== Junction list ==
The entire route is in York County.

Location	mi	km	Destinations	Notes
York	0.00	0.00	US 1 to I-95 (Maine Turnpike) / US 1A north – York, Kittery	Southern terminus
South Berwick	7.83	12.60	SR 236 (Harold L. Dow Highway) to SR 4 – South Berwick, Eliot	Northern terminus
1.000 mi = 1.609 km; 1.000 km = 0.621 mi
