= Vaughan Woods State Park =

State park in York County, Maine

Vaughan Woods Memorial State Park
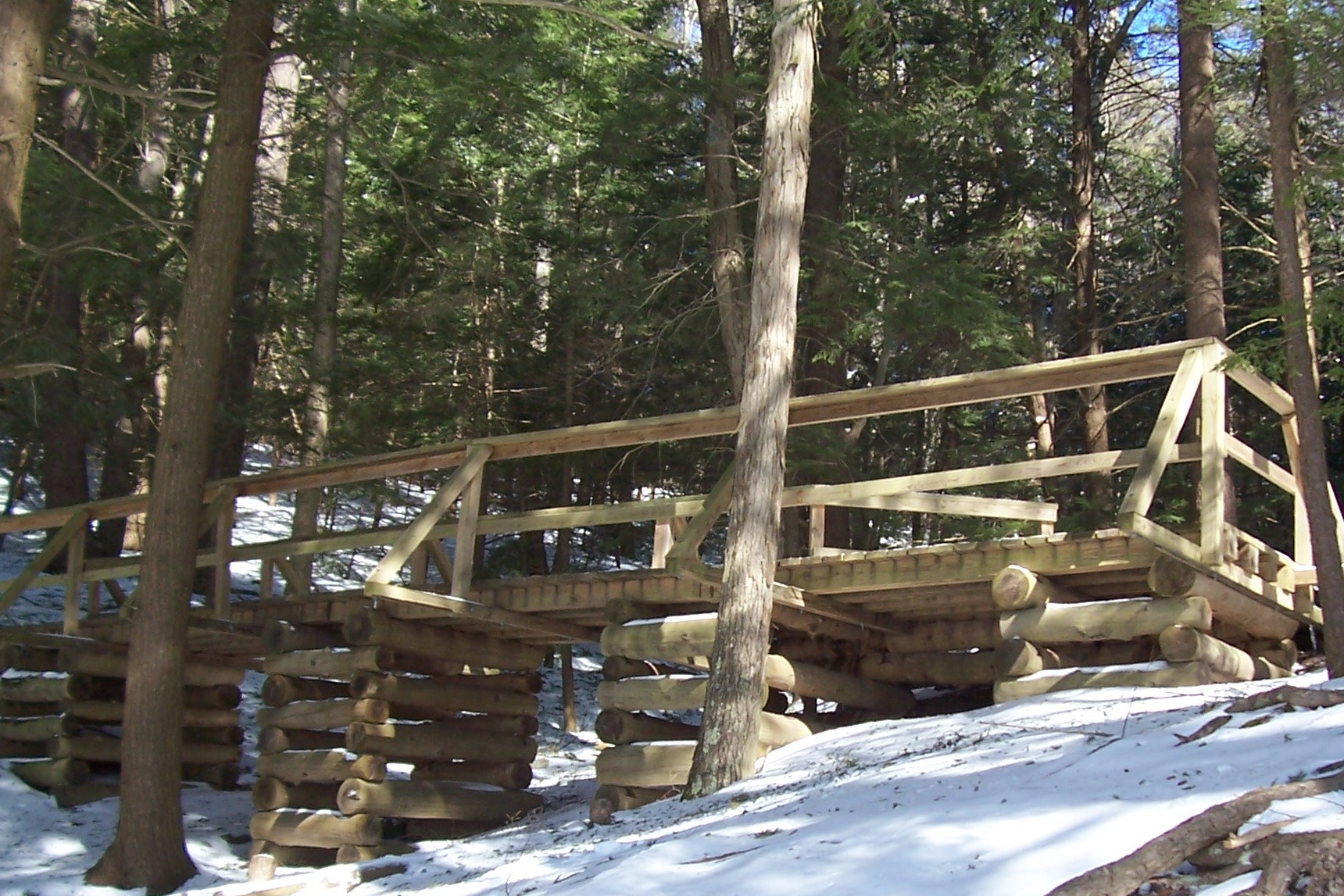
- Wood footbridge on trail in Vaughn Woods

- Location within Maine
- Interactive map of Vaughan Woods Memorial State Park
- Location: South Berwick, Maine, United States
- Coordinates: 43°12′30″N 70°48′50″W
- Area: 165 acres (67 ha)
- Elevation: 125 ft (38 m)
- Established: 1949
- Named for: Elizabeth Vaughan
- Administrator: Maine Department of Agriculture, Conservation and Forestry
- Website: Official website
- Maine State Parks

Vaughan Woods State Park is a public recreation area located along the Salmon Falls River on the western edge of South Berwick, Maine, at the New Hampshire border. The state park includes the restored Hamilton House, stands of old-growth forest, and 3 miles (4.8 km) of hiking trails. The lands were bequeathed to the state by Elizabeth Vaughan in 1949.
