= Jewett-Eastman House =

Historic house in Maine, United States

- U.S. National Register of Historic Places
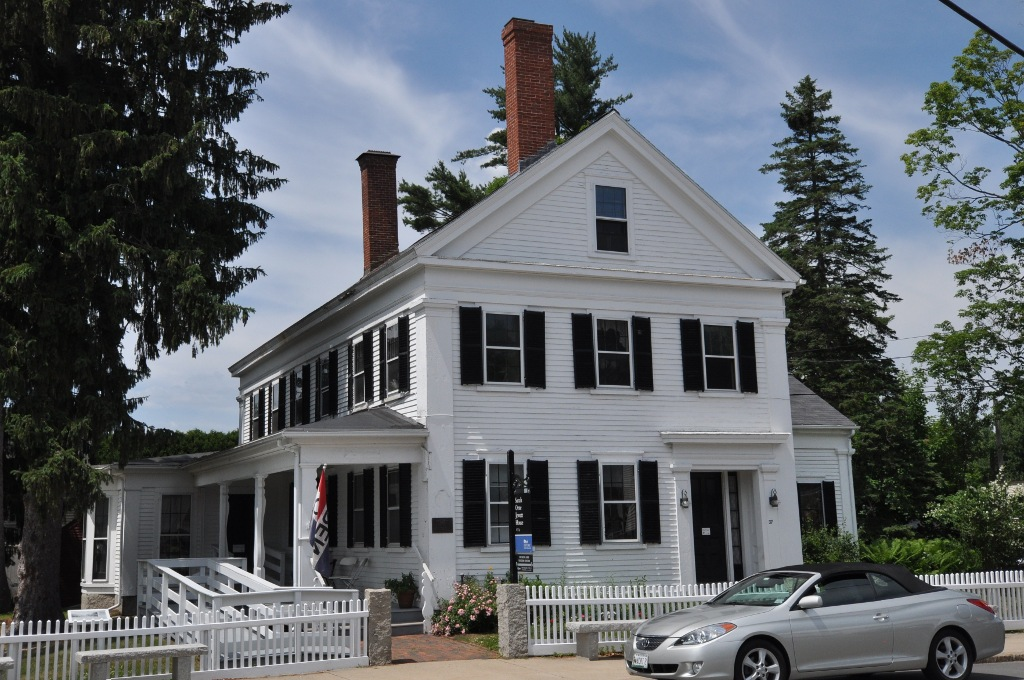

- Location within Maine Location within the United States
- Location: 37 Portland St., South Berwick, Maine
- Coordinates: 43°14′6″N 70°48′33″W
- Area: 0.5 acres (0.20 ha)
- Built: 1850
- Architectural style: Greek Revival
- NRHP reference No.: 83003700
- Added to NRHP: December 29, 1983

The Jewett-Eastman House is a historic house at 37 Portland Street in the center of South Berwick, Maine. Built about 1850, it is a fine local example of Greek Revival architecture. It is most notable for its association with the Jewett family, which included a prominent local businessman and a doctor, as well as the writer Sarah Orne Jewett, who was raised in this house. It served the town for a time as its public library, and is now owned by Historic New England, serving as a gallery space and as the visitors center for the adjacent Sarah Orne Jewett House.

== Description and history ==
The Jewett-Eastman House is located on the north side of Portland Street, just east of its junction with Main Street at the center of South Berwick's main village. It is located just east of the National Historic Landmark Sarah Orne Jewett House, which stands at that corner. It is a 2 1/2-story wood-frame structure, with a front-facing gable roof and clapboard siding. The original main entrance is located on the right bay of the three-bay front facade, set in a recessed opening flanked by Doric pilasters and topped by an entablature. The gable end is fully pedimented, with pilasters at the building's corners and an entablature encircling the building below the roofline. Single-story wings extend to either side of the main block from near its rear, and a hip-roof porch extends along the left side of the building, sheltering what is now the main entrance in the left wing.

The house was built about 1850 by Theodore Furbur Jewett for his son, Theodore Herman Jewett. The younger Jewett had been living in his father's house, which is where his first daughter Sarah was born in 1849. He raised his children in this house, which was passed down to his daughter Carol when she married Edwin Eastman. The Jewett homestead next door was given to Sarah and her sister Mary, both spinsters who died without issue. Theodore Jewett Eastman, the son of Carol and Edwin Eastman, donated both houses to the Society for the Preservation of New England Antiquities (SPNEA), now Historic New England (HNE).

The house was adapted for use as the South Berwick Public Library in the 1970s and was sold by SPNEA in 1984 to a local non-profit. Repurchased by HNE in 2011 after the library moved out, the house currently serves as a gallery and function space, as well as the visitors center for the adjacent Sarah Orne Jewett House.

== See also ==
- National Register of Historic Places listings in York County, Maine
- List of residences of American writers
