= Maine State Route 236 =

State highway in York County, Maine, US

State Route 236
- Harold L. Dow Highway

Route information
- Maintained by MaineDOT
- Length: 15.8 mi (25.4 km)
- Existed: 1957–present

Major junctions
- South end: SR 103 in Kittery
- US 1 / US 1 Byp. in Kittery; I-95 / Maine Turnpike / US 1 in Kittery; SR 4 in South Berwick
- North end: SR 9 in Berwick

Location
- Country: United States
- State: Maine
- Counties: York

Highway system
- Maine State Highway System; Interstate; US; State; Auto trails; Lettered highways
← SR 235	→ SR 237

State Route 236 (SR 236) is a state highway located in extreme southern Maine, entirely within York County. It begins at State Route 103 in Kittery and runs 15.72 miles (25.30 km) north, terminating at State Route 9 in Berwick. Between Kittery and South Berwick, SR 236 is known as the Harold L. Dow Highway. The highway runs roughly parallel to the New Hampshire border (the Salmon Falls River) over its entire length.

== Route description ==
The southern terminus of SR 236 is at the intersection of SR 103 (Whipple Road), Woodlawn Avenue, and Shapleigh Road in Kittery, near the Portsmouth Naval Shipyard. It follows Shapleigh Road and Rogers Road to the Kittery Traffic Circle, where it connects to US 1, US 1 Bypass, and Old Post Road. The rotary marks the southern end of the Dow Highway. SR 236 has partial interchanges with US 1 Bypass and I-95, then continues northwest along the former right-of-way of the B&M Railroad until intersecting SR 4 in South Berwick at the northern end of the Dow Highway. SR 236 is cosigned with SR 4 in downtown South Berwick, then splits off to follow Berwick Road into downtown Berwick along Allen Street to its northern terminus at SR 9 (School Street), approximately 1,200 feet (370 m) east of the New Hampshire state line. To the west, SR 9 crosses the Salmon Falls River into Somersworth, New Hampshire and continues west as NH 9 / NH 236.

NH 236 (which terminates at the state border) is a westward extension of SR 236 through downtown Somersworth to NH 108 south of Rochester. Though it does not directly connect to SR 236 as signed, the two routes are connected by SR 9.

== History ==
The northern section of SR 236, from Gould's Corner (near SR 103 and SR 101) in Eliot to downtown Berwick, was originally designated in 1929 as part of SR 103. That route was truncated to its current terminus in 1957, and its northern segment was re-designated as SR 236. Both SR 103 and SR 236 have a terminus at the other route. Most of the southern part of SR 236 between I-95 in Kittery and SR 91 in South Berwick was built in 1956 on the former right-of-way of the B&M Railroad after service was discontinued and the tracks removed four years earlier. While railroad service has disappeared, SR 236 is a busy commuter corridor connecting to I-95, the Portsmouth Naval Shipyard, and downtown Portsmouth.

== Junction list ==
The entire route is in York County.

Location	mi	km	Destinations	Notes
Kittery	0.00	0.00	SR 103 (Whipple Road) – Eliot, York	Southern terminus
Kittery	0.98– 1.08	1.58– 1.74	US 1 (State Road) to I-95 north / Maine Turnpike north – York, Portsmouth, NH	Rotary
Kittery	1.14– 1.27	1.83– 2.04	US 1 Byp. south – Portsmouth, NH	Interchange
Kittery	1.27– 1.49	2.04– 2.40	I-95 south / Maine Turnpike south – Portsmouth, NH, Boston, MA	Exits 2-3 on I-95 / Turnpike; access via US 1 north
Eliot	7.05	11.35	SR 103 east (State Road) – Eliot	Western terminus of SR 103
Eliot	7.44	11.97	SR 101 (Dover Road / Goodwin Road) – Kittery, Dover, NH	
South Berwick	10.14	16.32	SR 91 south (York Woods Road) – York	Northern terminus of SR 91
South Berwick	10.40– 10.43	16.74– 16.79	Great Works River	
South Berwick	11.84	19.05	SR 4 south (Main Street) – Rollinsford, NH, Dover, NH	Southern terminus of SR 4 concurrency
South Berwick	12.04	19.38	SR 4 north (Portland Street) – North Berwick, Sanford	Northern terminus of SR 4 concurrency
Berwick	15.72	25.30	SR 9 (School Street) – North Berwick, Somersworth, NH	Northern terminus
1.000 mi = 1.609 km; 1.000 km = 0.621 mi: Concurrency terminus; Incomplete access
