= South Eliot, Maine =

- Census-designated place
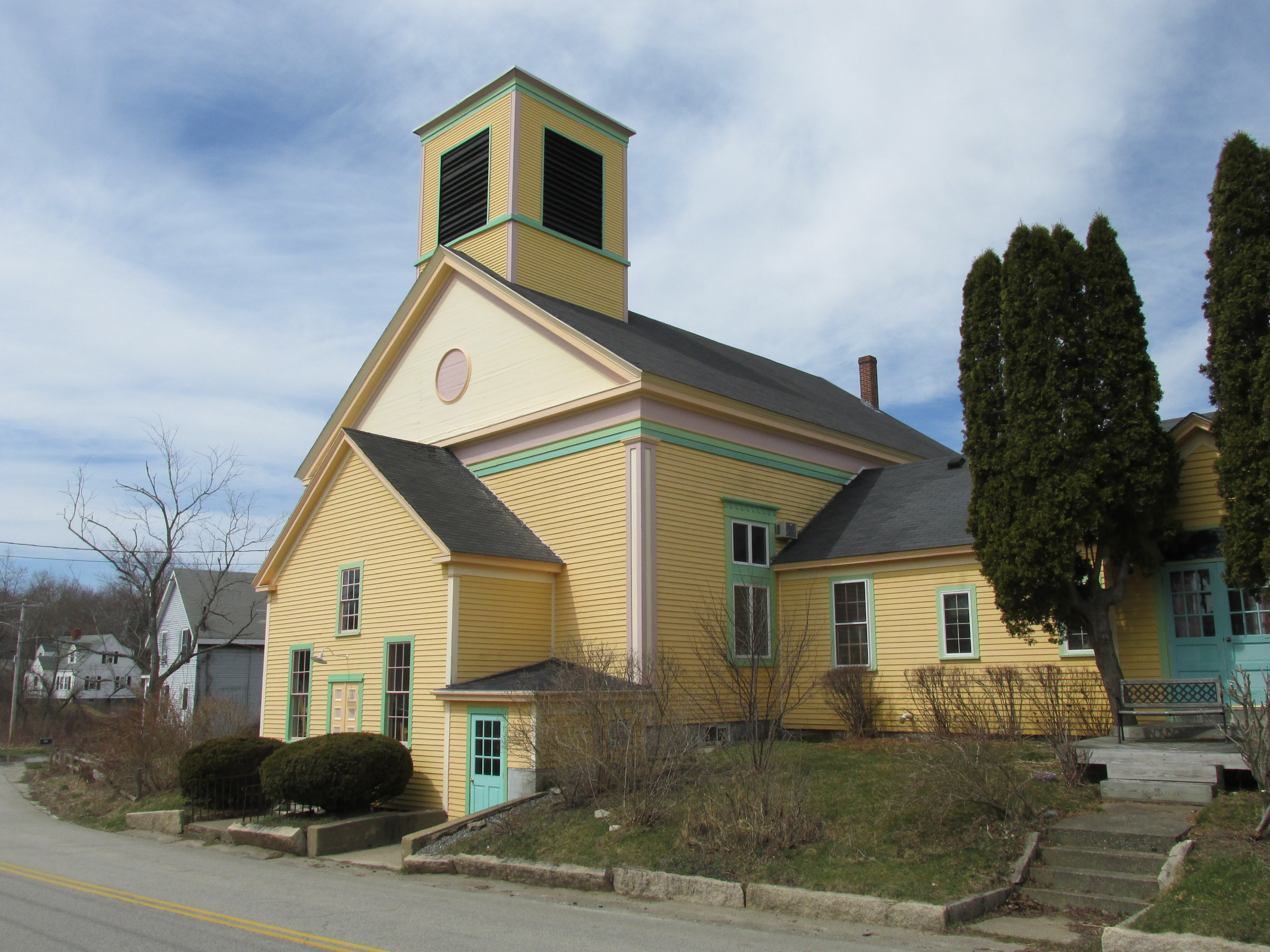
- Sanctuary Arts

- Location within Maine Location within the United States
- Coordinates: 43°07′20″N 70°47′17″W
- Country: United States
- State: Maine
- County: York

Area
  - Total: 7.61 sq mi (19.70 km^{2})
  - Land: 7.19 sq mi (18.63 km^{2})
  - Water: 0.42 sq mi (1.08 km^{2})
- Elevation: 49 ft (15 m)

Population (2020)
  - Total: 3,719
  - Density: 517.1/sq mi (199.66/km^{2})
- Time zone: UTC-5 (Eastern (EST))
  - Summer (DST): UTC-4 (EDT)
- ZIP Code: 03903 (Eliot)
- Area code: 207
- FIPS code: 23-70660
- GNIS feature ID: 2377957

South Eliot is a census-designated place (CDP) in the town of Eliot in York County, Maine, United States. As of the 2020 census, South Eliot had a population of 3,719. It is part of the Portland–South Portland–Biddeford, Maine Metropolitan Statistical Area.

== Geography ==
According to the United States Census Bureau, the CDP has a total area of 7.6 square miles (19.7 km^{2}), of which 7.2 square miles (18.6 km^{2}) is land and 0.4 square miles (1.1 km^{2}), or 5.47%, is water.

== Demographics ==
Historical population
Census	Pop.	Note	%±
2020	3,719		—
U.S. Decennial Census

=== 2020 census ===
As of the 2020 census, South Eliot had a population of 3,719. The median age was 49.3 years. 16.7% of residents were under the age of 18 and 24.9% of residents were 65 years of age or older. For every 100 females there were 90.0 males, and for every 100 females age 18 and over there were 88.0 males age 18 and over.

71.9% of residents lived in urban areas, while 28.1% lived in rural areas.

There were 1,619 households in South Eliot, of which 22.7% had children under the age of 18 living in them. Of all households, 54.0% were married-couple households, 13.6% were households with a male householder and no spouse or partner present, and 25.1% were households with a female householder and no spouse or partner present. About 27.9% of all households were made up of individuals and 15.7% had someone living alone who was 65 years of age or older.

There were 1,727 housing units, of which 6.3% were vacant. The homeowner vacancy rate was 0.2% and the rental vacancy rate was 5.2%.

Racial composition as of the 2020 census
Race	Number	Percent
White	3,461	93.1%
Black or African American	22	0.6%
American Indian and Alaska Native	1	0.0%
Asian	29	0.8%
Native Hawaiian and Other Pacific Islander	0	0.0%
Some other race	17	0.5%
Two or more races	189	5.1%
Hispanic or Latino (of any race)	79	2.1%

=== 2000 census ===
As of the census of 2000, there were 3,445 people, 1,386 households, and 988 families residing in the CDP. The population density was 479.9 inhabitants per square mile (185.3/km^{2}). There were 1,455 housing units at an average density of 202.7 per square mile (78.3/km^{2}). The racial makeup of the CDP was 98.46% White, 0.15% African American, 0.12% Native American, 0.49% Asian, 0.15% from other races, and 0.64% from two or more races. Hispanic or Latino of any race were 0.49% of the population.

There were 1,386 households, out of which 32.2% had children under the age of 18 living with them, 61.3% were married couples living together, 7.9% had a female householder with no husband present, and 28.7% were non-families. 22.9% of all households were made up of individuals, and 10.7% had someone living alone who was 65 years of age or older. The average household size was 2.49 and the average family size was 2.94.

In the CDP, the population was spread out, with 24.3% under the age of 18, 5.1% from 18 to 24, 28.9% from 25 to 44, 27.8% from 45 to 64, and 13.8% who were 65 years of age or older. The median age was 41 years. For every 100 females, there were 90.1 males. For every 100 females age 18 and over, there were 87.9 males.

The median income for a household in the CDP was $50,711, and the median income for a family was $64,402. Males had a median income of $41,513 versus $27,708 for females. The per capita income for the CDP was $25,431. About 6.1% of families and 6.8% of the population were below the poverty line, including 8.5% of those under age 18 and 3.3% of those age 65 or over.
