= Charles Sleeper =

American politician

Charles Sleeper (1856-1924) was an American physician, state legislator, and Collector of the Port of Portland, Maine.

Sleeper graduated from the Medical School of Maine at Bowdoin College.

Sleeper was a member of the Maine House of Representatives from South Berwick, Maine (1911–12) before being appointed by Democratic President Woodrow Wilson to the lucrative position of Port Collector in 1916.
