= Raitt Homestead Farm Museum =

Coordinates: 43.16729°N 70.81026°W

The Raitt Homestead Farm Museum is a farm museum in Eliot, Maine. The Raitt Homestead Farm was built in 1896 on 33 acres (13 ha). The owner, Charles A. Raitt, used the farm to manufacture bricks, maintain a sawmill and grow an apple orchard. Upon Charles' death, the farm was inherited by his son Roland. During the Great Depression of the 1930s, the farm was turned into a dairy farm. When Roland Raitt died in 1962, the farm went to his son Gerald. The adjacent apple orchard, which had previously been sold, was reacquired and added to the farmstead. In 1996, the first Eliot Antique Tractor & Engine Show was held on the farm and the Eliot Antique Tractor & Engine Association was formed. The Association was granted non-profit status and in 2003, Gerald Raitt donated the homestead to the Association in exchange for a life interest in the property. The Raitt Homestead Farm Museum is open only during events. It is a 100% all volunteer organization dedicated to the preservation of farming history. The Raitt Farm educates children and the community at large about farming history and the importance of growing your own food and preserving nature. They are preserving the 33 acre former dairy farm and maintain all the various buildings on the property. There is an abundance of wildlife that lives on the farm year round as well.
