= Portsmouth Company =

- Portsmouth Company Cotton Mills: Counting House
- U.S. National Register of Historic Places
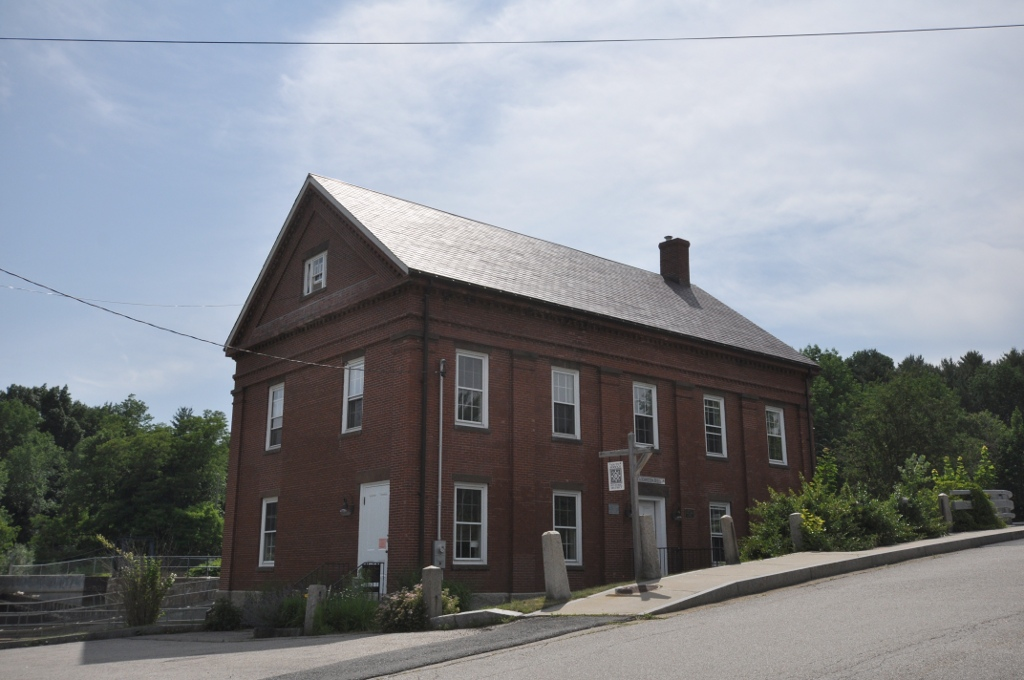

- Location within Maine Location within the United States
- Location: ME 4 at Salmon Falls River, South Berwick, Maine
- Coordinates: 43°13′37″N 70°48′41″W
- Area: 1 acre (0.40 ha)
- Built: 1832
- Architectural style: Greek Revival
- NRHP reference No.: 75000208
- Added to NRHP: October 10, 1975

The Portsmouth Company was a cotton mill established in 1832 in South Berwick, Maine, UA, one of several in the area. It was operated for many years under the control of the Portsmouth, New Hampshire-based Hale family.

Its counting house is now a museum operated by the Old Berwick Historical Society.

== History ==
The Portsmouth Company cotton mill was incorporated in 1831. It operated a large mill in South Berwick, Maine.

== The Counting House museum ==
The Counting House is a historic industrial building at Main and Liberty Streets in South Berwick, the only company structure to survive. Although it is traditionally given a construction date of 1832, architectural evidence suggests a later one around 1850. It was listed on the National Register of Historic Places in 1975, and is now home to the Old Berwick Historical Society, which operates it as the Counting House Museum.

=== Description ===
The Portsmouth Company Counting House is a 2½ story brick structure set at the southern corner of Liberty Street and Main Street (Maine State Route 4), on the eastern bank of the Salmon Falls River. It sits on a granite foundation and is topped by a steeply pitched gabled roof. The gable ends are fully pedimented, with a recessed triangular panel featuring a three-part rectangular window on each end. The building corners are pilastered in brick, with a brick entablature encircling the building below the roof. The south-facing main facade is five bays wide, articulated by brick pilasters. The entrance is on center, accessing three rooms on the first floor and a large open space on the second. The interior has well-preserved Greek Revival woodwork.

== See also ==
- National Register of Historic Places listings in York County, Maine
