= Maine State Route 101 =

State highway in York County, Maine, US

State Route 101

Route information
- Maintained by MaineDOT
- Length: 8.22 mi (13.23 km)
- Existed: 1940, 1957 (current alignment)–present

Major junctions
- South end: US 1 in Kittery
- SR 236 in Eliot
- North end: Gulf Road near Dover, NH

Location
- Country: United States
- State: Maine
- Counties: York

Highway system
- Maine State Highway System; Interstate; US; State; Auto trails; Lettered highways
← SR 100	→ SR 102

State Route 101 (SR 101) is a short state highway in extreme southern Maine. It follows a southeast–northwest trajectory, signed as south–north. SR 101 begins at an intersection with U.S. Route 1 (US 1) in Kittery, and runs northwest to the New Hampshire state line, where it continues as Gulf Road, an unnumbered local road in Dover towards New Hampshire Route 4.

== Route description ==
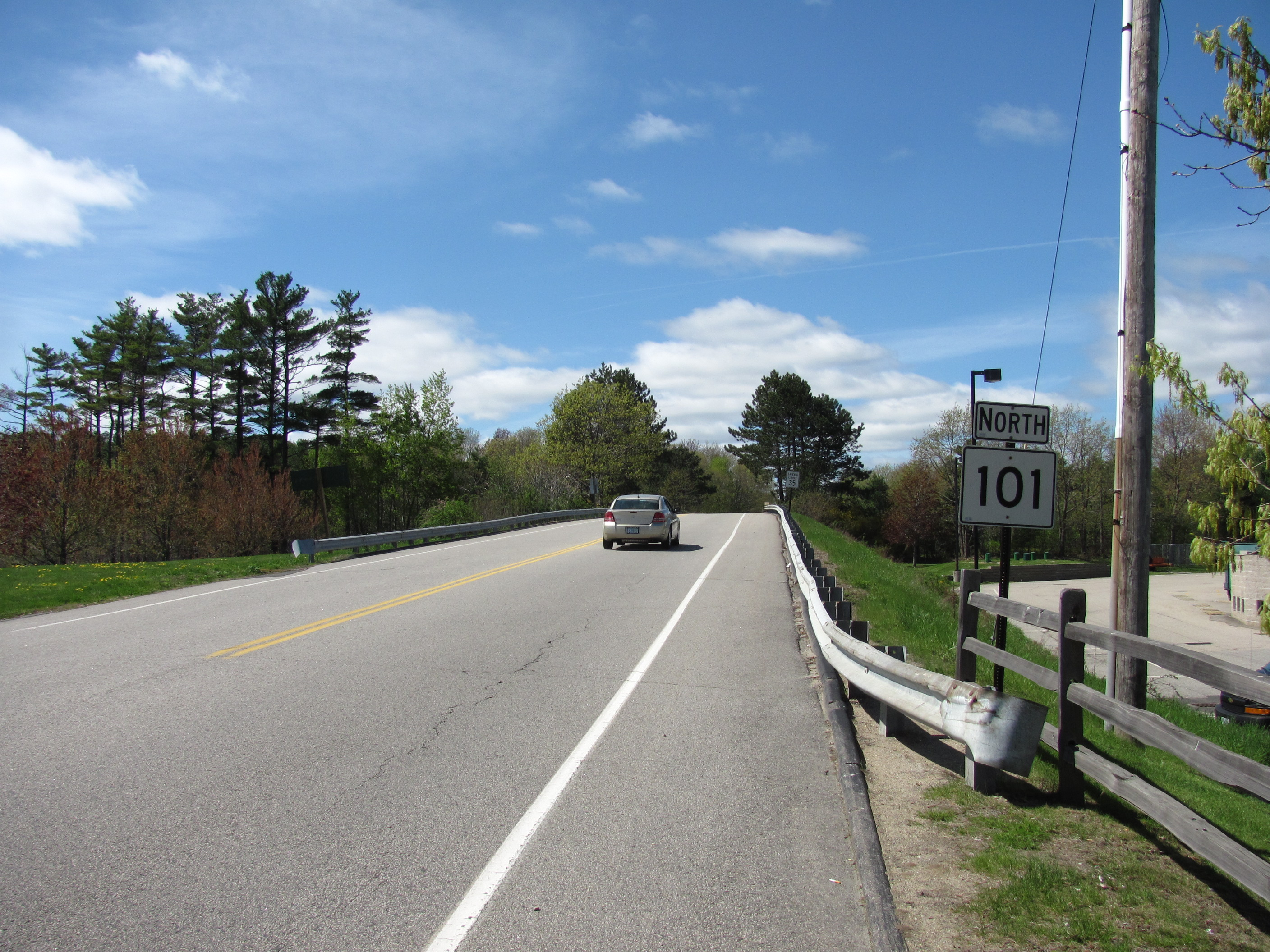
Northbound in Kittery

SR 101 begins in the south at an intersection with US 1 in Kittery, just northeast of its intersection with SR 236, where US 1 Bypass meets its northern end. Near this intersection is the exits 2 and 3 interchanges from the Maine Turnpike. The route heads northwest, intersecting local roads as it passes east of the town of Eliot. SR 101 intersects with SR 236 and enters the southern tip of South Berwick. The highway continues a short distance northwest before crossing the Piscataqua River into Dover, New Hampshire. Upon crossing into New Hampshire, SR 101 ends and the road continues as unnumbered Gulf Road. Motorists following this road west will soon come across signage leading to New Hampshire Route 4 towards downtown Dover. No advance signage exists in the reverse direction, with Gulf Road simply transitioning to SR 101 upon crossing into Maine.

== History ==
The SR 101 number existed as early as 1925, when New England Interstate Routes were still in place. Former SR 101 ran between Augusta and Rockland, from NER 20 (now US 201) to NER 1 (now US 1). When the New England road system was removed, SR 101 was redesignated as SR 17 and the number remained out of use until 1940.

The current SR 101 was first designated in 1940, with the initial stretch following the modern alignment from Kittery to South Berwick, where it ended at SR 103, near the current intersection with SR 236. The short extension to the state line was added in 1957, and the route has stood since.

== Junction list ==
The entire route is in York County.

Location	mi	km	Destinations	Notes
Kittery	0.00	0.00	US 1 – York, Portsmouth, NH	Southern terminus of SR 101; to I-95 / US 1 Bypass / SR 236 via US 1 south
Eliot	6.9	11.1	SR 236 – South Berwick, Eliot	To SR 103
South Berwick	8.22	13.23	Gulf Road to NH 4 – Dover, NH	Unnumbered continuation into New Hampshire
1.000 mi = 1.609 km; 1.000 km = 0.621 mi
