= Sarah Orne Jewett House =

Historic house in Maine, United States

- U.S. National Register of Historic Places
- U.S. National Historic Landmark
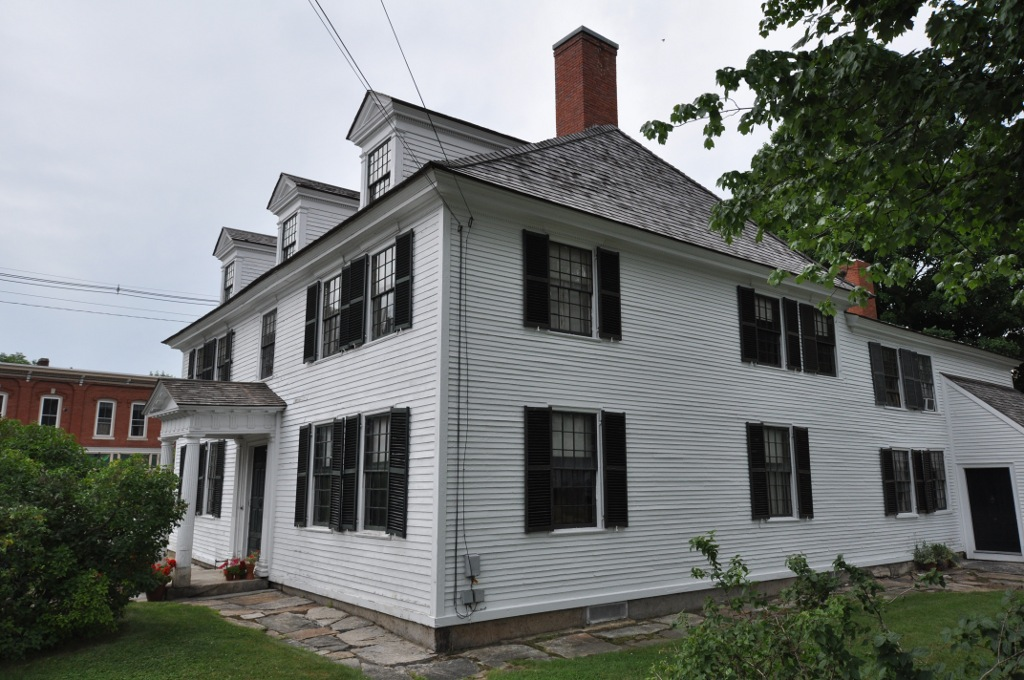

- Location within Maine Location within the United States
- Location: ME 4 and 236; South Berwick, Maine
- Coordinates: 43°14′5″N 70°48′32″W
- Area: less than one acre
- Built: 1774
- Architectural style: Georgian, Greek Revival
- NRHP reference No.: 73000248

Significant dates
- Added to NRHP: June 4, 1973
- Designated NHL: July 17, 1991

The Sarah Orne Jewett House is a historic house museum at 5 Portland Street in South Berwick, Maine, United States. The house was designated a National Historic Landmark in 1991 for its lifelong association with the American author Sarah Orne Jewett (1849–1909), whose influential work exemplified regional writing of the late 19th century. The house, built in 1774, is a high-quality example of late Georgian architecture. It is now owned by Historic New England, and is open for tours every weekend between June and October, and two Saturdays per month the rest of the year.

== Description ==
The Jewett House is set prominently at the northeast corner of Main and Portland Streets in the center of South Berwick, Maine. The house, a two-story wood-frame structure with clapboard siding, was built in 1774 for John Haggins, a successful merchant. It is surmised from the modest exterior and elaborate interior that Haggins did exceptionally well during the American Revolutionary War, and was thus able to afford a higher quality of workmanship for the interior.

The main block of the house is five bays wide and two deep, with a hip roof pierced in front by three gabled dormers. A gable-roofed Colonial Revival portico shelters the main entrance; it (and the dormers) were added in the late 19th century. A two-story ell extends to the rear of the main block. The interior has an elaborately decorated entrance hall, with a keystone arch supported by fluted pilasters, and a staircase whose carved balusters and posts were reported to take two men 100 days to complete. The public rooms downstairs also feature decorative Georgian carved paneling. The rooms are decorated to the late 19th century, and the bedroom of Sarah Orne Jewett on the second floor is essentially as it was when she died there.

== History ==
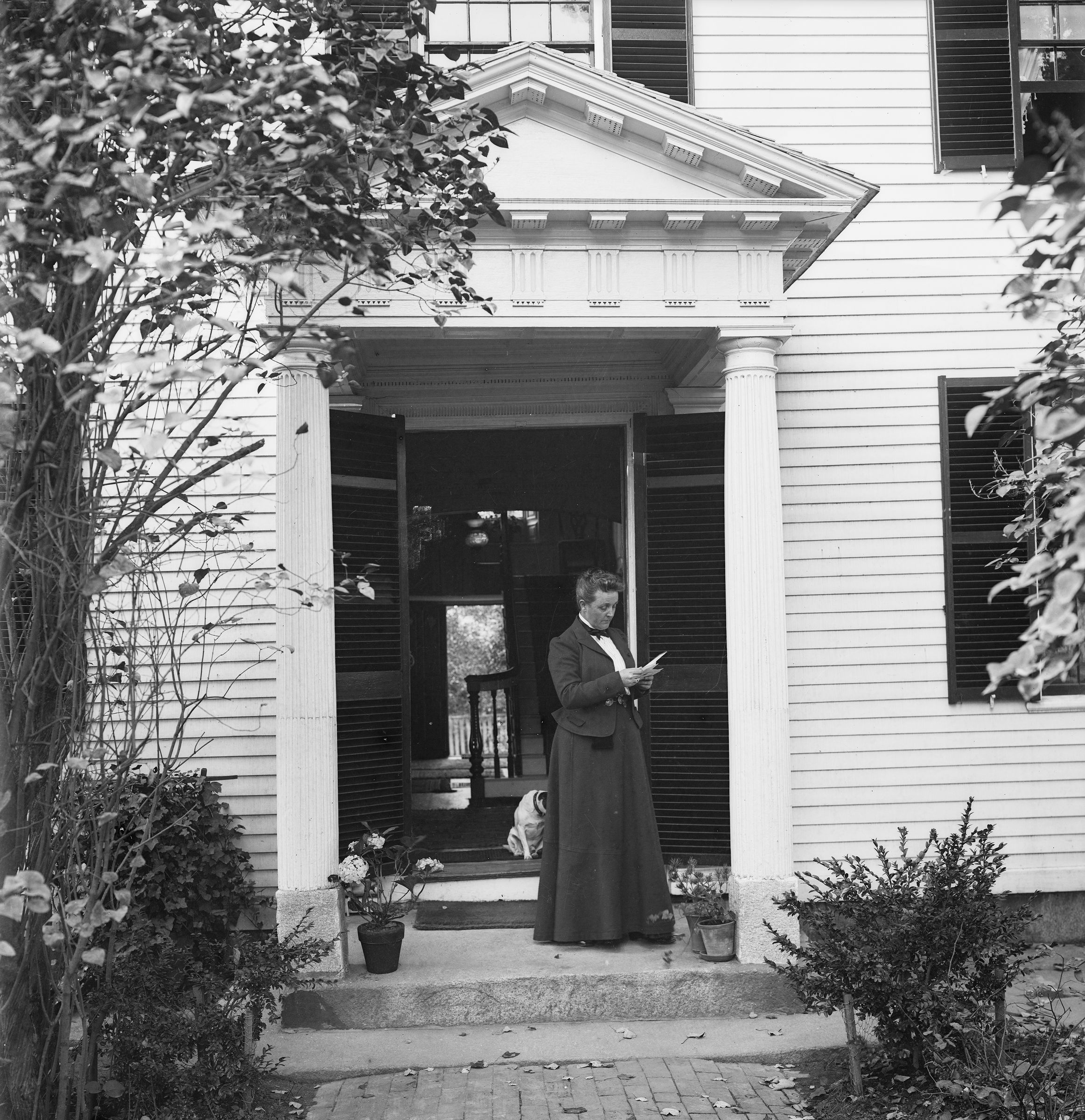
Sarah Orne Jewett in the doorway of her home in South Berwick, Maine

Theodore Jewett, also a merchant, moved his family into the house sometime in the 1820s. John Haggins died in 1819, and his estate sold the house to Jewett in 1839. His son, Dr. Theodore H. Jewett, moved into the house in 1848, and it is here that his second daughter Sarah was born the following year. From 1854 to 1877 the young family lived next door, in what is now called the Jewett-Eastman House. Sarah Orne Jewett and her sister Mary inherited this house in 1887, with their younger sister Caroline moving into the 1854 house next door. The two sisters, neither of whom married, lived in the house for the rest of their lives.

Theodore Jewett died in September 1878 and Sarah turned to her friend Annie Adams for comfort, particularly after the death of her husband James T. Fields. In the summer of 1882, the two women traveled to Europe together and began a relationship which has been termed a "Boston marriage". Thereafter, the two women shared spaces and divided their time between the Jewett home in South Berwick, the Fields home on Charles Street in Boston, or a summer home at Manchester-by-the-Sea, Massachusetts.

Sarah Orne Jewett became widely known for her writing after the publication in 1896 of The Country of the Pointed Firs. The work popularized a form of literature now called American literary regionalism, in which the character of a region (in Jewett's case, rural southern Maine) is infused into the writing. She was hailed by writer Willa Cather for her influence, and her publications and life are the regular subject of scholarly interest. Jewett convinced her friend Emily Tyson and Tyson's stepdaughter Elise to purchase and restore the house in 1898. Jewett used the home as a model for the setting of her book The Tory Lover in 1901.

After the death of Sarah in 1909 and Mary in 1930, the house was inherited by Caroline's husband Edwin Eastman; he gave the property to the Society for the Preservation of New England Antiquities (SPNEA, now Historic New England). That organization now operates the main house as a house museum dedicated to Sarah Orne Jewett, with the Jewett-Eastman House serving as a visitors center. Historic New England also oversees the Hamilton House in town.

The house was listed on the National Register of Historic Places in 1973, and was declared a National Historic Landmark on July 17, 1991.

== See also ==
- National Register of Historic Places listings in York County, Maine
- List of National Historic Landmarks in Maine
