= Hamilton House (South Berwick, Maine) =

Historic house in the United States

- U.S. National Register of Historic Places
- U.S. National Historic Landmark
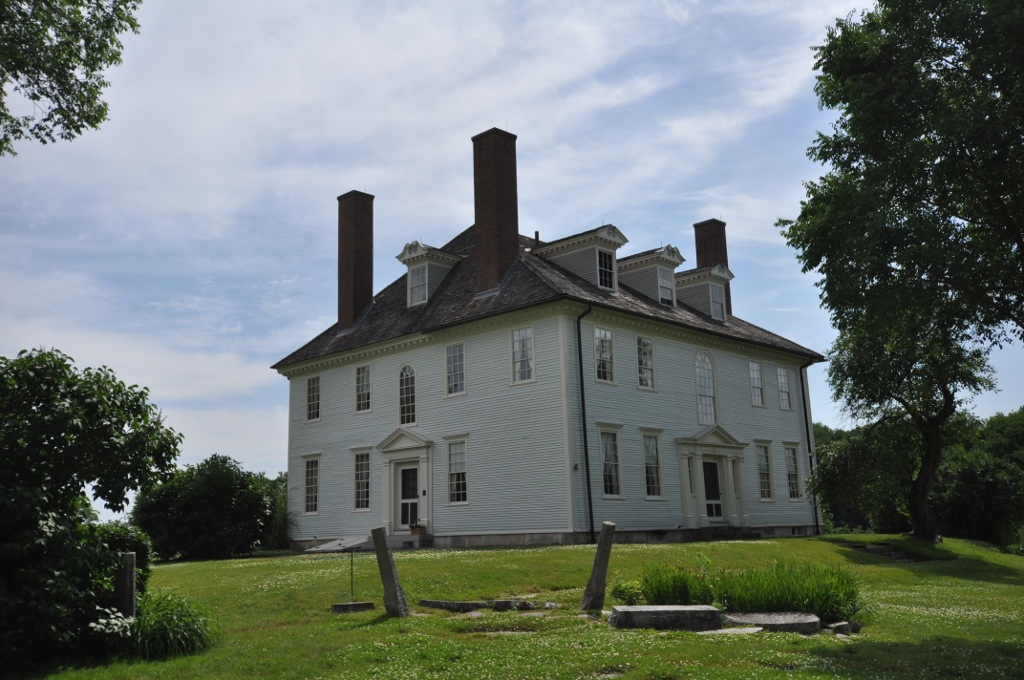
- Hamilton House in 2014

- Location within Maine Location within the United States
- Location: 40 Vaughan's Lane, South Berwick, Maine
- Coordinates: 43.2129°N 70.8156°W
- Built: 1787
- Architectural style: Georgian
- NRHP reference No.: 70000082

Significant dates
- Added to NRHP: December 30, 1970
- Designated NHL: December 30, 1970

The Jonathan Hamilton House, also known as the Hamilton House, is a historic house at 40 Vaughan's Lane in South Berwick, Maine. Built between 1787 and 1788 by a merchant from Portsmouth, New Hampshire, this National Historic Landmark is a little-altered and high quality late Georgian country house. Acquired by preservationist friends of South Berwick native Sarah Orne Jewett at the turn of the 20th century, it is now a historic house museum owned by Historic New England, open for tours between June and October.

== Description and history ==
The Hamilton House is set on 50 acres (20 ha) of land overlooking the Salmon Falls River, the border between South Berwick and Rollinsford, New Hampshire. It is a 2 1/2-story wood-frame building, with a hip roof, clapboard siding, four brick chimneys symmetrically placed in its outside walls, and gabled dormers on all four elevations. It has entrances on its north, south, and east sides, each flanked by pilasters and topped by a gabled pediment; that on the north side has a more elaborate treatment, with sidelight windows and a second pair of pilasters. On the north and east facades, there are Palladian windows above the entrances.

The interior of the house follows a center-hall plan, with a wide central hall decorated with wallpaper that is a reproduction (made in 1900) of older wallpaper found in the house. The two parlor chambers and dining room have mahogany window seats, paneled chimney surrounds, and folding inside window shutters. The dining room and south parlor have wallpaper painted in 1900 by George Porter Fernald.

In 1783 land for the house was purchased by Jonathan Hamilton, a merchant who had profited during the American Revolutionary War by privateering. Known as Pipe Stave Landing, the property was advantageous for landing goods from his merchant ships. The house he built was, according to tax records, the most valuable in South Berwick. Hamilton died in 1802, and the property was sold out of the family in 1815. For much of the 19th century it was owned by the Goodwin family, who operated a farm on the property, and let the grand house decline in condition.

When the Goodwins put the property up for sale in 1898, local author Sarah Orne Jewett convinced her friend Emily Tyson, and Tyson's stepdaughter Elise, to purchase and restore the house in the then-fashionable Colonial Revival. The Tysons made only modest alterations to the house, and restored some of its fabric, including the wallpaper in the central hall. Their most significant changes were outside, where they built the handsome garden and cottage (the latter now serving as a visitor center) south of the house. After the death of Elise Tyson Vaughan in 1949, the house was bequeathed to the Society for Preservation of New England Antiquities, now Historic New England. It is now operated by them as a historic house museum, with tours offered between June and October.

The house was declared a National Historic Landmark and listed on the National Register of Historic Places in 1970. Isabella Stewart Gardner owned a copy of The Tory Lover, a historical romance novel by Jewett, that has an inscription indicating that Hamilton House was the setting for the novel.

In 2020, Historic New England was awarded a grant of $165,000 from the Save America's Treasures program to fund repairs to the house. Historic New England began a fundraising campaign to raise the required matching funds.

== See also ==
- Sarah Orne Jewett House, a second National Historic Landmark owned by Historic New England in South Berwick
- List of National Historic Landmarks in Maine
- National Register of Historic Places listings in York County, Maine
