= Charles Frost (military officer) =

Military figure during King William's War

Major Charles Frost (1631–1697) was an English-born military leader in Maine during King William's War.

== Biography ==
Frost was born in Tiverton, Devon, England. He married Mary Bolles in 1660. They had a daughter, Sarah Frost, born in 1666.

Frost was stationed in Kittery, Maine (present-day Eliot, Maine). He was the highest-ranking military leader in Maine during King William's War until he was killed by Indians, along with a number of other local residents at Ambush Rock. He was reportedly killed for his role in Richard Waldron's subterfuge against several hundred Indians during King Philips War.

Aggrieved natives never forgot. According to Everett Stackpole's "Old Kittery and Her Families":

The night after Frost's burial the Indians opened his grave, took out the body, carried it to the top of Frost's hill and suspended it upon a stake. His resting place was marked some years later with a flat stone, on which is a rudely chiseled inscription, "Here lyeth intrrd ye body of Mj. Charles Frost ager 65 years Decd July ye 4th 1697." The spot where he was slain is near a large boulder, on which is a suitable inscription. It is known as Ambush Rock.

On 4 July 1897, the newly formed Eliot Historical Society held a commemoration ceremony as their first public event, marking the 200th anniversary of the natives' killing of Frost.

Charles Frost was the 5th great-grandfather of American poet Robert Frost.

== Legacy ==
- Namesake of Frost Hill, Eliot, Maine (Natives dug up Frost's body and hoisted it upon a pole at the top of Frost's Hill)
- Honored on a plaque at Ambush Rock in Eliot, where he died in an Indian attack

== See also ==
- Winthrop Hilton
- Richard Waldron
