= Eliot, Maine =

- Town
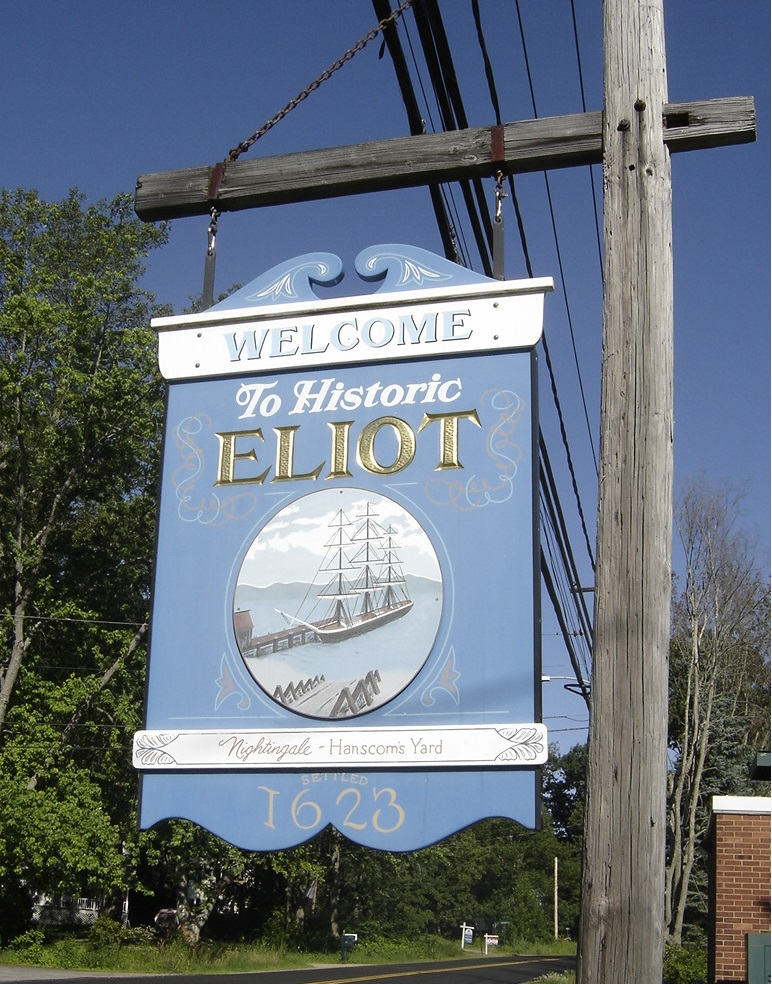
- Welcome to Historic Eliot sign on ME Rt. 103 in South Eliot

- Flag Seal

- Location within Maine Location within the United States
- Coordinates: 43°07′53″N 70°46′30″W
- Country: United States
- State: Maine
- County: York
- Incorporated: 1810

Government
  - Type: Town meeting

Area
  - Total: 21.32 sq mi (55.22 km^{2})
  - Land: 19.78 sq mi (51.23 km^{2})
  - Water: 1.54 sq mi (3.99 km^{2})
- Elevation: 7 ft (2.1 m)

Population (2020)
  - Total: 6,717
  - Density: 340/sq mi (131.1/km^{2})
- Time zone: UTC-5 (Eastern (EST))
  - Summer (DST): UTC-4 (EDT)
- ZIP code: 03903
- Area code: 207
- FIPS code: 23-22955
- GNIS feature ID: 582464
- Website: www.eliotme.gov

Eliot is a town in York County, Maine, United States. Originally settled in 1623, it was formerly a part of Kittery, to its east. After Kittery, it is the next most southern town in the state of Maine, lying on the Piscataqua River across from Portsmouth and Newington, New Hampshire. The population was 6,717 at the 2020 census. It is part of the Portland-South Portland-Biddeford metropolitan area. The town contains the census-designated place of South Eliot.

Eliot is home to Ambush Rock, Green Acre, and the Raitt Homestead Farm Museum.

== History ==
=== Founding ===
Today's town of Eliot was formerly the Middle Parish of the town Kittery, Maine, originally part of the royal grant to Sir Ferdinando Gorges known as the Piscataqua Plantation. Kittery was incorporated in 1647, today distinguishing itself as "the oldest incorporated town in Maine."

While this may be so, settlements upriver on the north side of the Piscataqua River in today's Eliot were established considerably earlier, owing to more favorable conditions for harborage, timber, and shipbuilding. This is the basis for Eliot maintaining it was "settled" almost a quarter century earlier in 1623.

In 1659 the local court decreed that there should be two meeting houses in Kittery. The town's inhabitants disagreed, and held a town meeting on July 17, 1660, where it was:

...Agreed and fully consented unto that this town of Kittery is by free consent divided into three parts for settling of three ministers, one in the east part as followeth, one at Nichewancick [today's Berwick] which bound ae to come doown unto Thompson point brook formerly called the black Brook and from that Brook the second division is to go downward to the great cove below Thos. Spinney's Point and the third division to go down from the great cove unto Brave Boat Harbor with Capt. Champernown Island, all of which three divisions according as they are divided each division to bear their own charges for the maintenance of their own minister.

The Upper Parish, then known as the Parish of Unity, later became the town of Berwick (incorporated in 1713), with the uppermost part of Kittery along the Piscataqua becoming the Upper Parish. Left without a meeting house or minister, the residents of a newly created Middle Parish between the Upper and Lower along the river between it and Spinney's Cove [Great Cove] were permitted by order of the court to attend church across the Piscataqua in either the towns of Dover, New Hampshire or Portsmouth for one-half their going rates.

Prior to Eliot's incorporation as a town on March 1, 1810, the Upper Parish had been in conflict with Kittery's other parishes since at least 1791. In 1791, the parish's minister died. His successor, according to a large faction of the parish's inhabitants, was a man of "unfair character" imposed by "a small party" of people. He was rejected by "a large majority", and a new minister was installed in 1792. The internal strife between inhabitants didn't stop there.

The minority faction, angered by the removal of their minister, petitioned the Legislature in 1796 to be set off to the Upper Parish, which was accordingly done. The inhabitants of the second Parish, which was left without a meetinghouse and left to worship across the river at half rate in the town of Portsmouth, New Hampshire, accused the members of the other two of conspiring against them.

The town was likely named for Reverend John Eliot of Boston, a friend of General Andrew P. Fernald, the town agent largely responsible for its separation.

=== Scotland Bridge ===
A section of northern Eliot bordering on York came to be known as Scotland Bridge after Scots prisoners of war from the English Civil War Battle of Dunbar were resettled there in 1650. These Scots had been force-marched to Durham Cathedral in Durham, England, then tried for treason for supporting Charles II rather than Oliver Cromwell, Lord Protector. The name remains today.

== Geography ==
According to the United States Census Bureau, the town has a total area of 21.32 square miles (55.22 km^{2}), of which 19.78 square miles (51.23 km^{2}) is land and 1.54 square miles (3.99 km^{2}) is water. Eliot is drained by Sturgeon Creek and the Piscataqua River.

Eliot is served by state routes 91, 101, 103 and 236. The town is northwest of Interstate 95 and near the New Hampshire border.

== Parks and Recreation ==
All parks follow a “Carry-In, Carry-Out” trash policy. There are no public trash cans on site.

=== Eliot Boat Basin ===
Also commonly known as "Dead Duck", Eliot Boat Basin is located down Hammond Lane in Eliot. It contains a public boat launch out to the Piscataqua River, a public beach, playground, short and easy walking trails, and restrooms. There is plenty to do for families. There is a parking lot on site.

=== Frost Tufts Park ===
Frost Tufts Park is currently under construction. It is on Old Road, about a ¼ mile from William Fogg Library. There is a basketball court, tennis courts, playing fields, portable restrooms, and pavilion with picnic tables. As of 2026, the playground in the park has been removed. Additionally, there is a dog park behind the playing fields. There is a parking lot with overflow parking on the dirt road beside the fields.

=== William Murray-Rowe Park ===
The William Murray-Rowe Park is located on River Road. There is a baseball field and other multipurpose fields. It contains portable restrooms, picnic tables, and a dirt parking lot.

=== Hammond Park and Dixon Road Recreation Area ===
The Hammond Park and Dixon Road Recreation Area is located beside the Town Hall and across from Eliot Elementary School. There is a seasonal ice skating rink, gazebo, and a skate park. Parking is available in the Town Hall parking lot or at Eliot Elementary School outside of functioning hours.

== Demographics ==
Historical population
Census	Pop.	Note	%±
1810	1,650		—
1820	1,679		1.8%
1830	1,845		9.9%
1840	1,889		2.4%
1850	1,803		−4.6%
1860	1,767		−2.0%
1870	1,769		0.1%
1880	1,640		−7.3%
1890	1,463		−10.8%
1900	1,458		−0.3%
1910	1,530		4.9%
1920	1,530		0.0%
1930	1,462		−4.4%
1940	1,932		32.1%
1950	2,509		29.9%
1960	3,133		24.9%
1970	3,497		11.6%
1980	4,948		41.5%
1990	5,329		7.7%
2000	5,954		11.7%
2010	6,204		4.2%
2020	6,717		8.3%
U.S. Decennial Census

As of 2022 the median income for a household in the town was $93,231, and the median income for a family was $106,210. Males had a median income of $55,714 versus $37,500 for females. The per capita income for the town was $41,551. About 3.08% of families and 6.47% of the population were below the poverty line, including 7.1% of those under age 18 and 3.5% of those age 65 or over.

=== 2010 census ===
As of the census of 2010, there were 6,204 people, 2,509 households, and 1,783 families residing in the town. The population density was 313.7 inhabitants per square mile (121.1/km^{2}). There were 2,669 housing units at an average density of 134.9 per square mile (52.1/km^{2}). The racial makeup of the town was 96.8% White, 0.7% African American, 0.1% Native American, 0.5% Asian, 0.3% from other races, and 1.5% from two or more races. Hispanic or Latino of any race were 1.2% of the population.

There were 2,509 households, of which 31.7% had children under the age of 18 living with them, 59.0% were married couples living together, 8.3% had a female householder with no husband present, 3.7% had a male householder with no wife present, and 28.9% were non-families. 23.4% of all households were made up of individuals, and 10.1% had someone living alone who was 65 years of age or older. The average household size was 2.47 and the average family size was 2.89.

The median age in the town was 45.4 years. 22.1% of residents were under the age of 18; 5.9% were between the ages of 18 and 24; 21.3% were from 25 to 44; 36.1% were from 45 to 64; and 14.6% were 65 years of age or older. The gender makeup of the town was 48.8% male and 51.2% female.

== Sites of interest ==
- Green Acre
- Raitt Homestead Farm Museum
- Frost Garrison and House, Frost’s Hill
- Punkintown

== Gallery ==
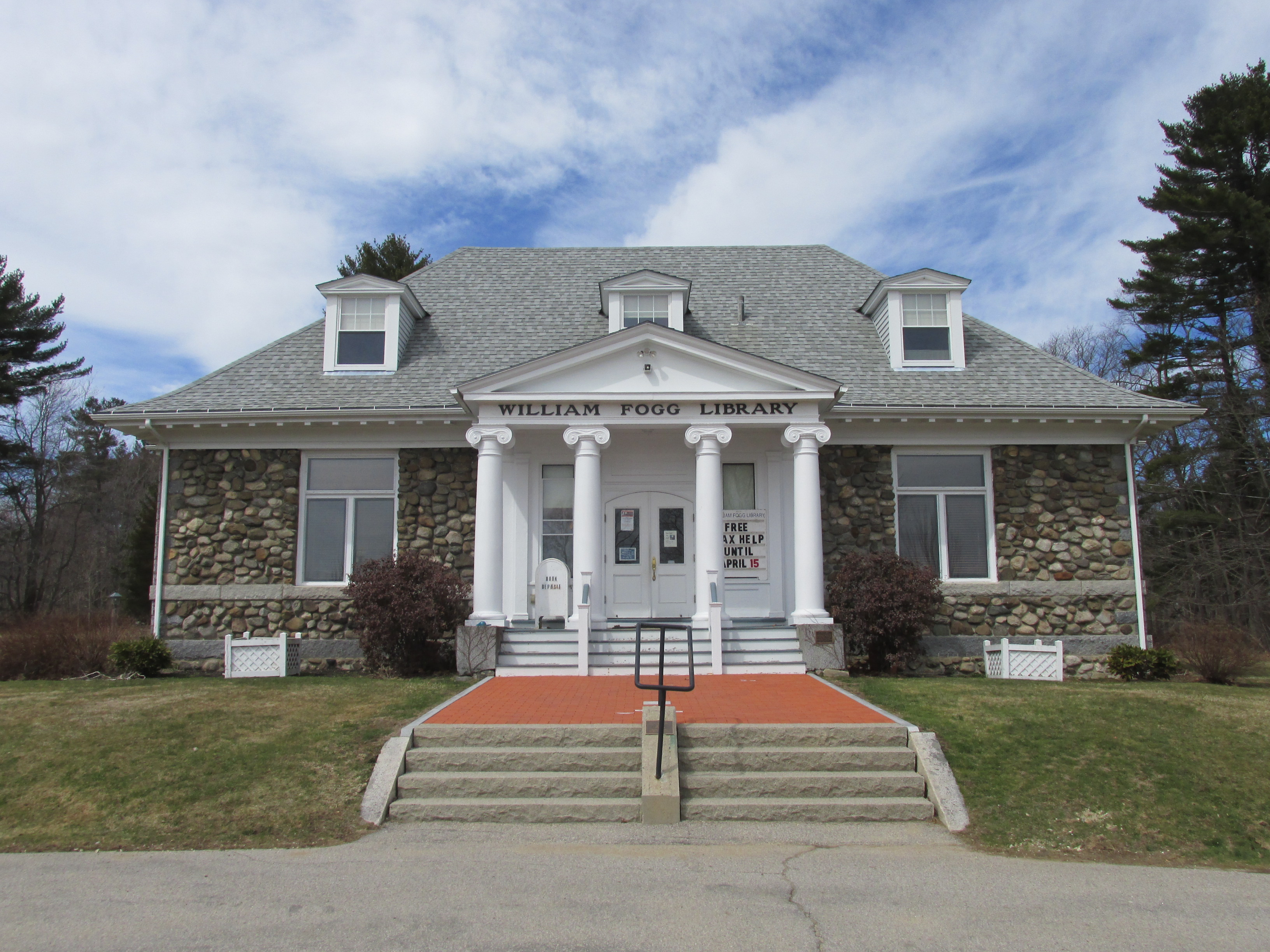
William Fogg Library

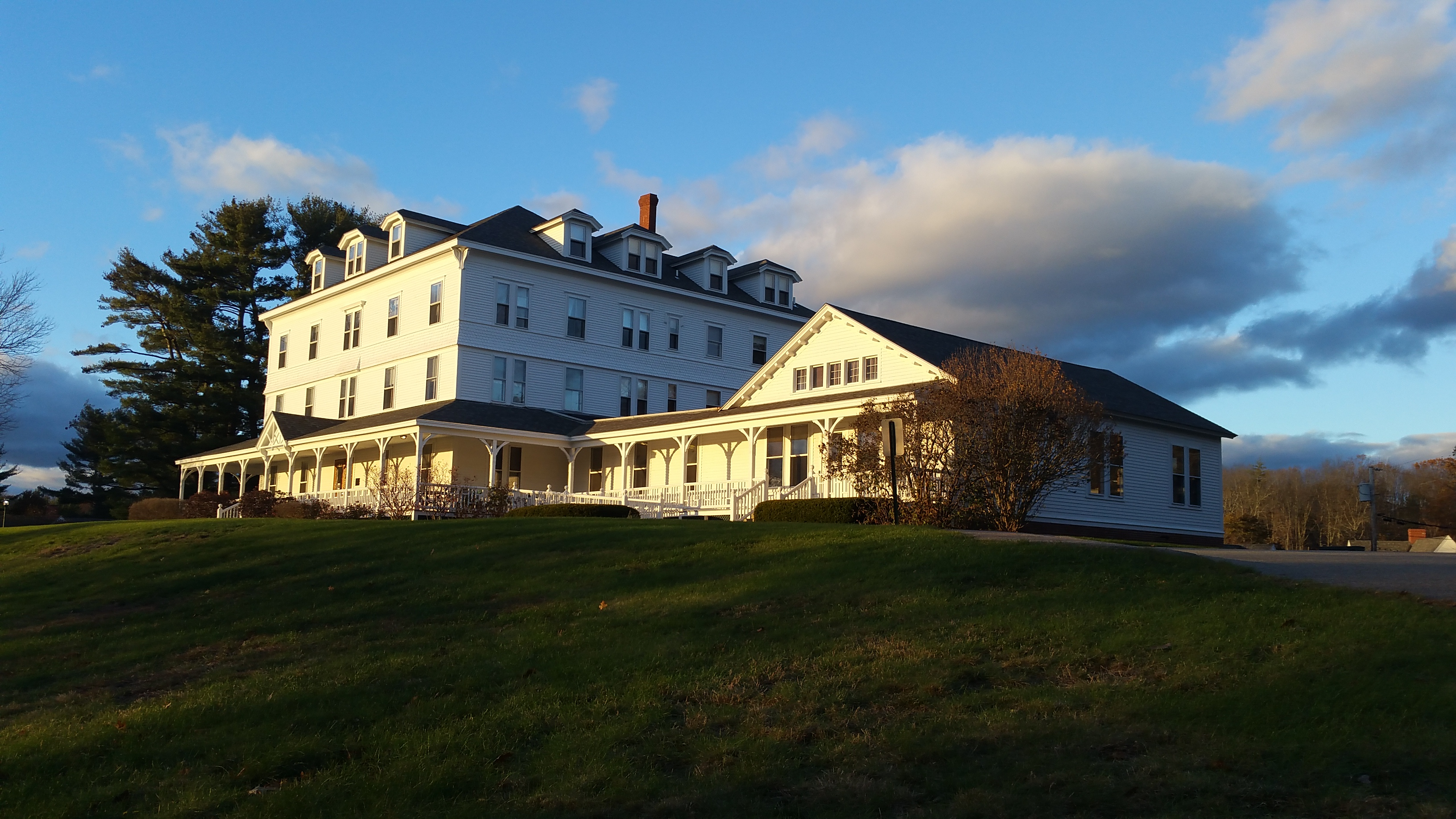
Green Acre

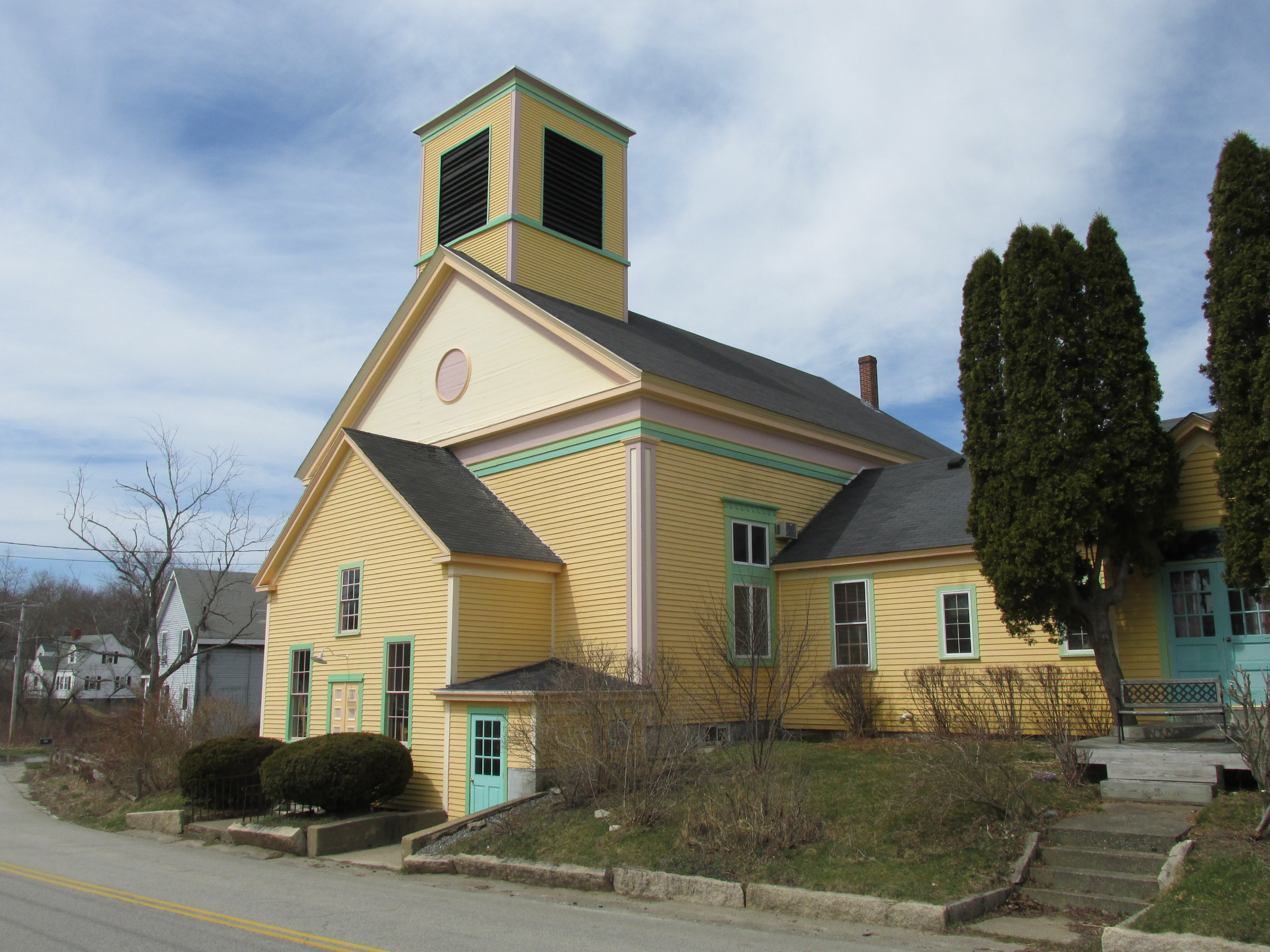
Sanctuary Arts studio

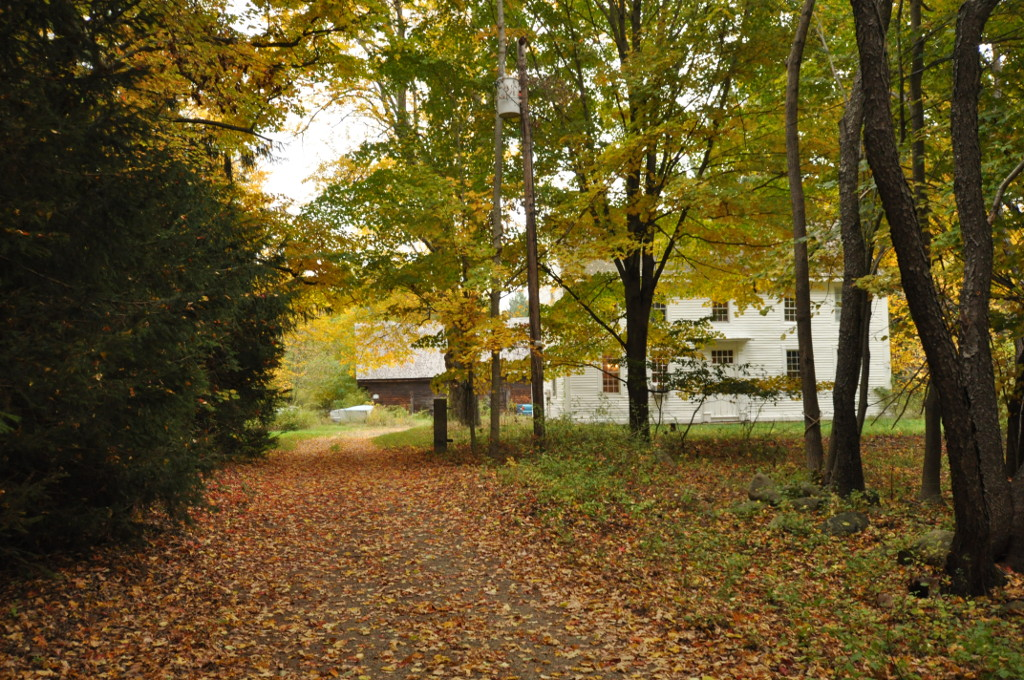
Frost House

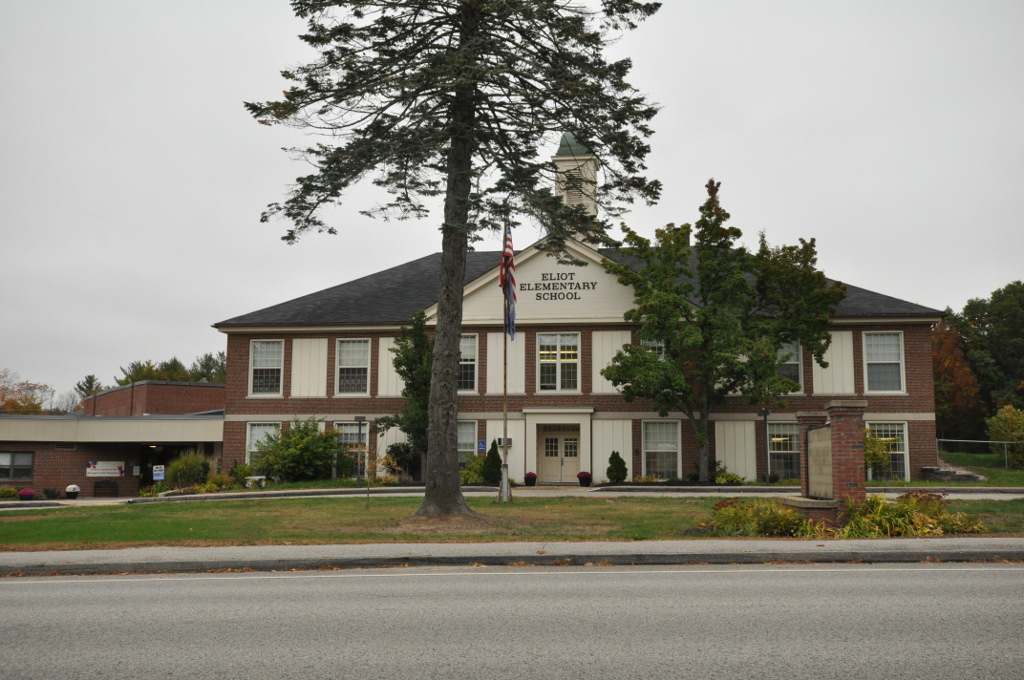
Eliot Elementary School

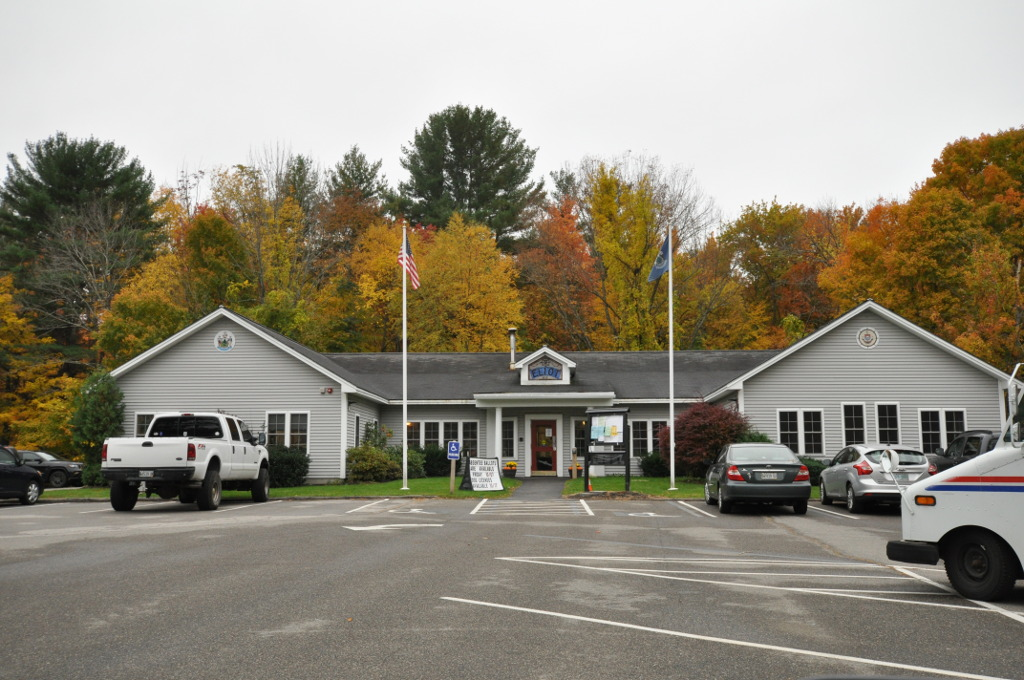
Eliot Town Hall

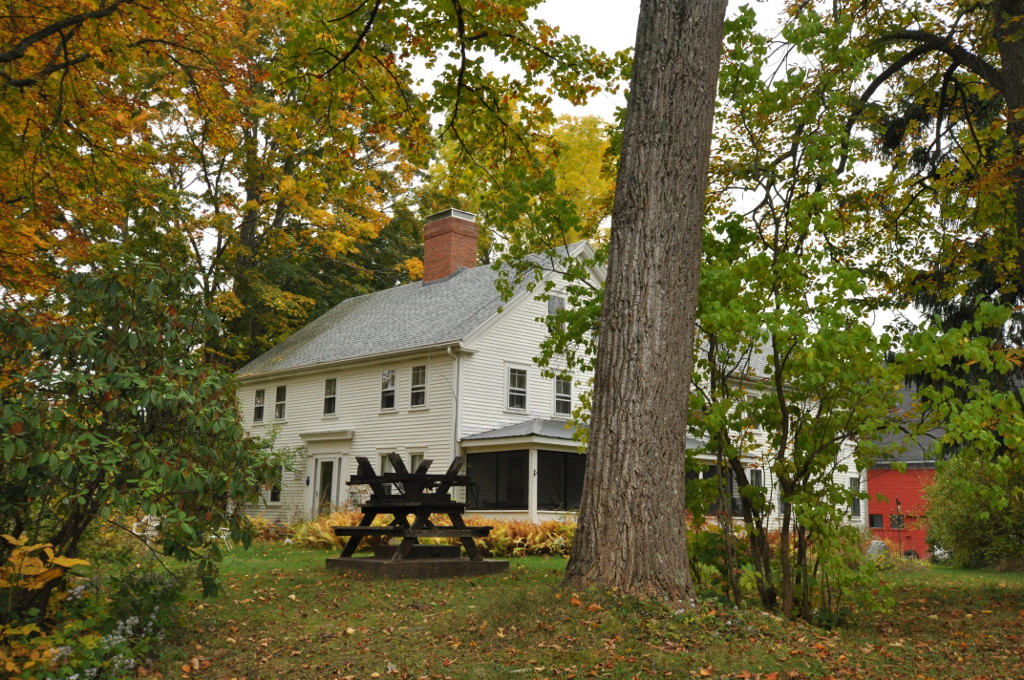
Paul Family Farm

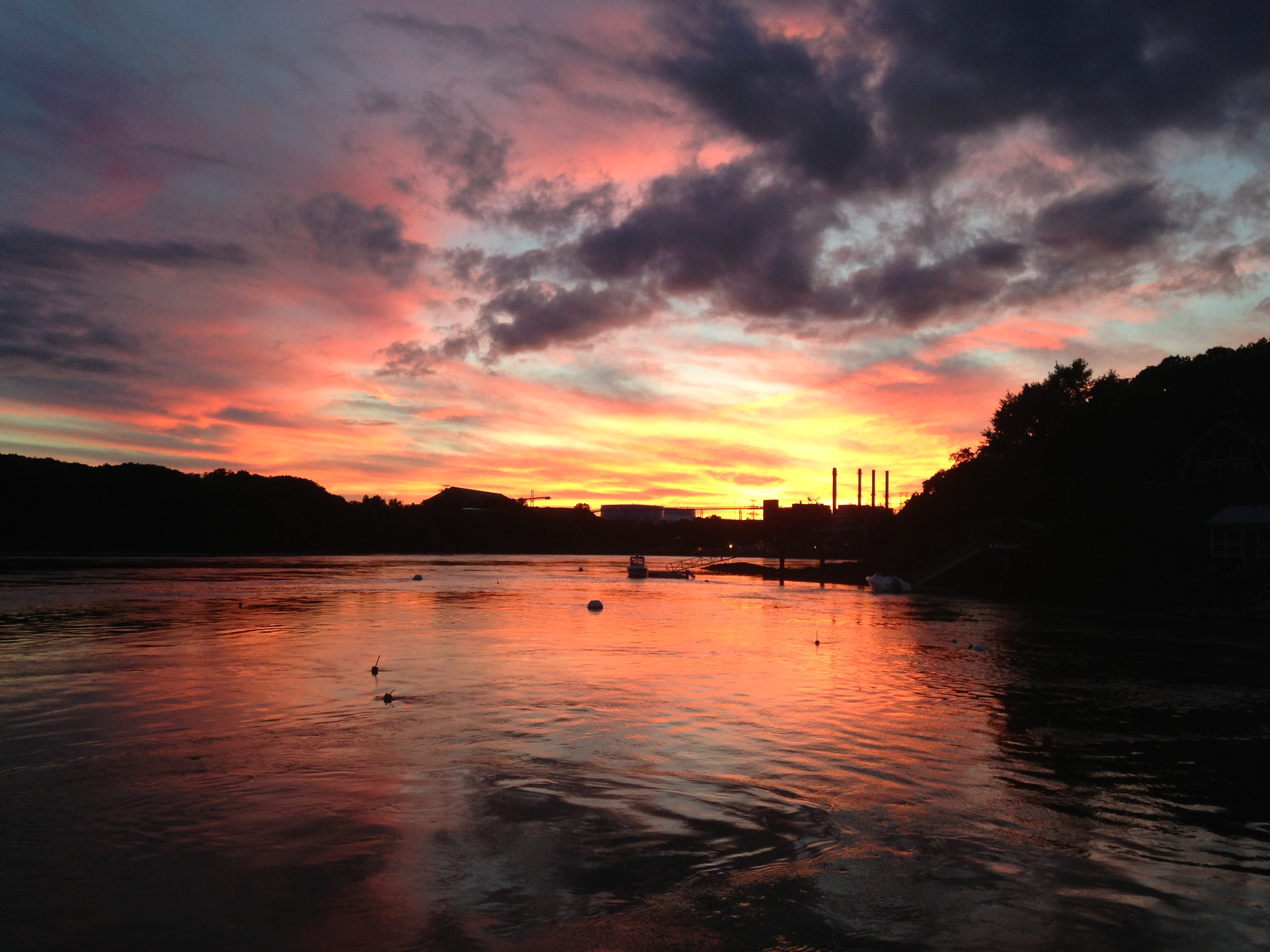
Sunset over the Piscataqua River on the Long Reach, Eliot on right, September 2014

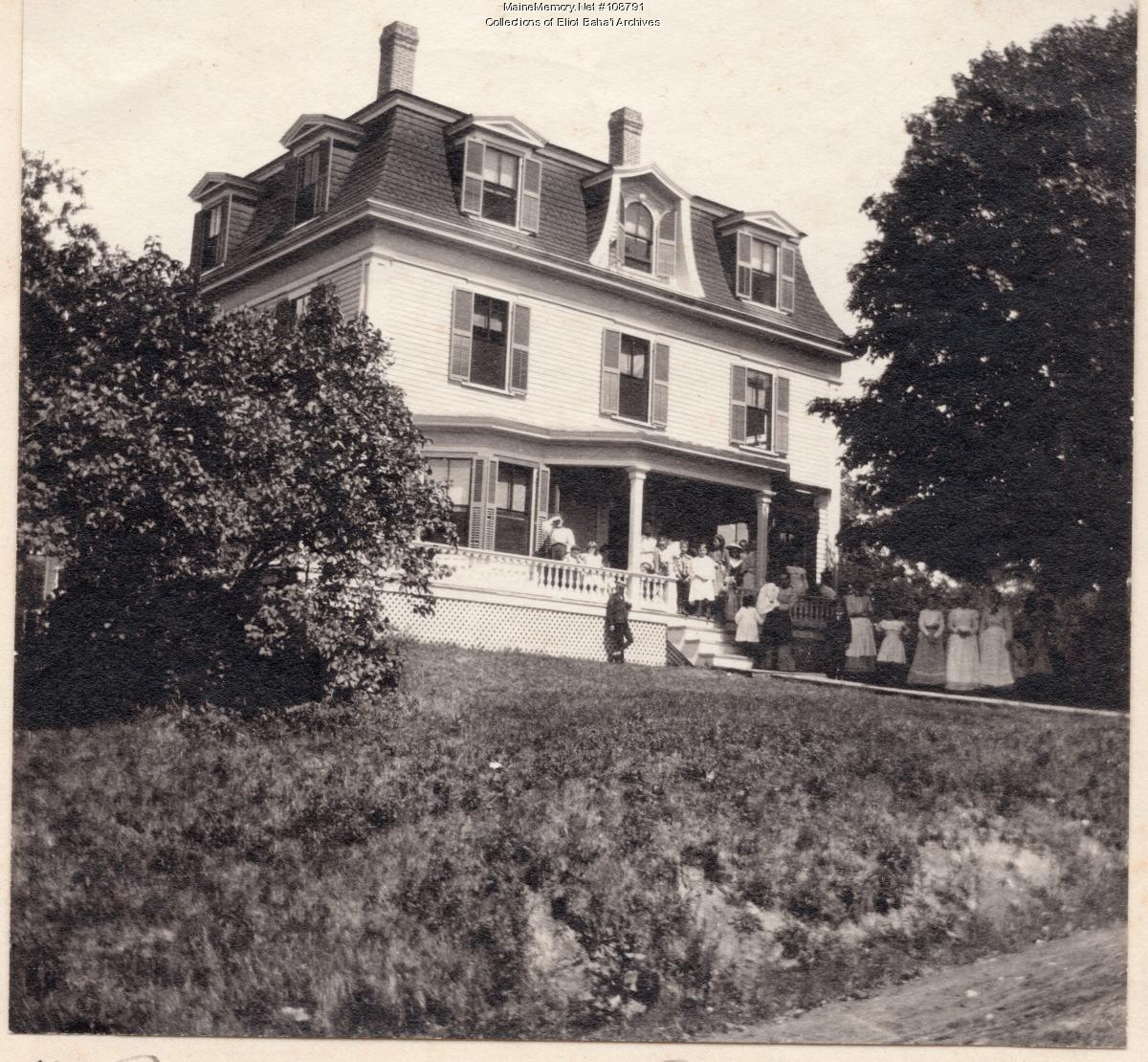
Rosemary Cottage

== Government ==
Voter Registration: 29.72% Republican. 27.27% Democrat. 2.01% Green Independent. 41.00% Un-enrolled.

Eliot's form of government provided by its charter is Town Meeting, Select Board, and Town Manager.

== Education SAD35 (Eliot, South Berwick, and Rollinsford) ==
- Eliot Elementary School
- Central School
- Great Works School
- Marshwood Middle School
- Marshwood High School
- Seacoast Waldorf School (private)

== Notable people ==
- Shem Drowne, coppersmith, America's first documented weathervane maker
- Hannah Tobey Farmer, philanthropist, writer, social reformer; wife of Moses G. Farmer
- Moses Gerrish Farmer, inventor
- Sarah Jane Farmer, founder of the Greenacre Conferences and Monsalvat School of Eliot
- Charles Frost, Colonial Military Leader
- John Fremont Hill, 45th governor of Maine (1901–1905)
- Thomas F. Spencer, US Army major general
