= Plaisted =

Plaisted is a surname and occasional masculine given name. People with the name Plaisted include:

== Surname ==
- David Plaisted, American professor of computer science
- Frederick W. Plaisted (1865–1943), American politician and state governor
- Harris M. Plaisted (1828–1898), American Congressman and state governor
- Joan Plaisted (born 1945), American diplomat and ambassador
- Ralph Plaisted (1927–2008), American explorer who reached the North Pole in 1968
- Trent Plaisted (born 1986), American retired professional basketball player
- Elenore Plaisted Abbott (1875–1935), American illustrator and painter

== Given name ==
- George Plaisted Sanderson (1836–1915), American politician
- Alexander Plaisted Saxton (1919–2012), American historian and novelist
- James Plaisted Wilde (1816–1899), British judge and rose breeder
