= South Berwick, Maine =

Town in Maine, United States

South Berwick
- Town
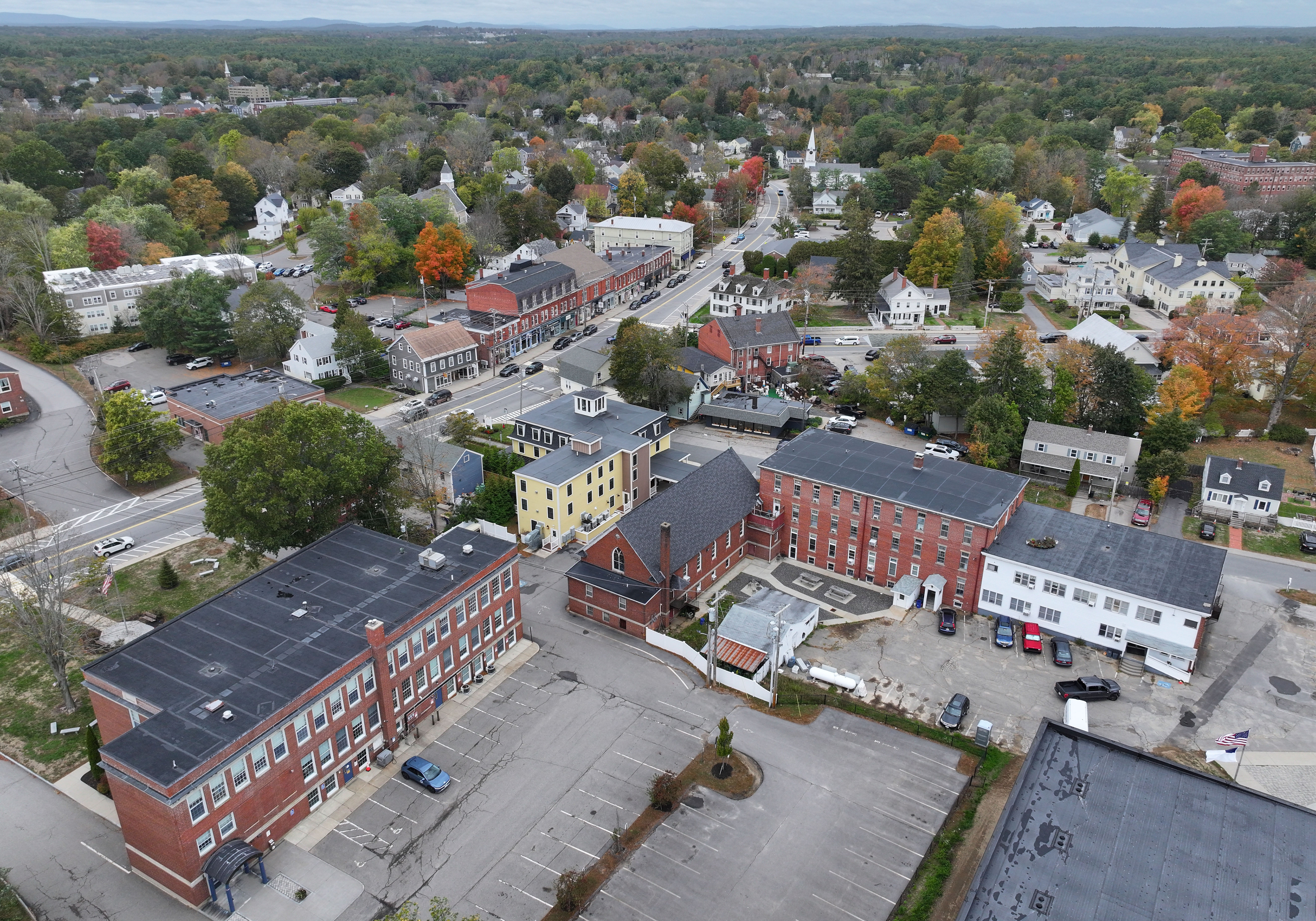
- Central Square
- Nickname: SoBo
- Location within the state of Maine
- Coordinates: 43°14′04″N 70°49′30″W
- Country: United States
- State: Maine
- County: York
- Settled: 1631
- Incorporated: 12 February 1814
- Villages: South Berwick; Emerys Bridge; Great Works; Jewett

Government
  - Type: Town Council
  - Town Manager: Tim Pellerin
  - Town Council: Chair: Mallory Cook; John C. Kareckas; John James; Jessica Cyr; Jeff Minihan

Area
  - Total: 32.64 sq mi (84.54 km^{2})
  - Land: 32.13 sq mi (83.22 km^{2})
  - Water: 0.51 sq mi (1.32 km^{2})
- Elevation: 102 ft (31 m)

Population (2020)
  - Total: 7,467
  - Density: 232/sq mi (89.7/km^{2})
- Time zone: UTC-5 (Eastern)
  - Summer (DST): UTC-4 (Eastern)
- ZIP code: 03908
- Area code: 207
- FIPS code: 23-70030
- GNIS feature ID: 0582732
- Website: www.southberwickmaine.org

South Berwick is a town in York County, Maine, United States. The population was 7,467 at the 2020 census. South Berwick is home to Berwick Academy, a private, co-educational university-preparatory day school founded in 1791, along with the two public elementary schools, and one high school.

The town was set off from Berwick in 1814, followed by North Berwick in 1831. It is part of the Portland-South Portland-Biddeford metropolitan area. The primary village in the town is the South Berwick census-designated place.

== History ==
The area was called Newichawannock by the Abenaki people, meaning "river with many falls," a reference to the Salmon Falls River. It was first settled by Europeans about 1631 as a part of Kittery known as Kittery North Parish. Near the confluence with the Great Works River, Ambrose Gibbons built the Great House at Newichawannock, a palisaded trading post, to exchange goods with the Indians.

In 1634, William Chadbourne, James Wall, and John Goddard arrived from England aboard the ship Pied Cow to build a sawmill and gristmill at Assabumbadoc Falls. The first houses built in South Berwick were built by Chadbourne and Wall. Chadbourne's house was in the northwesterly angle of Brattle Street and Dow Highway (Rt. 236). Richard Leader, an engineer, rebuilt the sawmill in 1651 to handle up to 20 saws. The factory became known as the "Great mill workes," from which the Great Works River derives its name. It was run by 25 Scottish prisoners of war captured by Oliver Cromwell's forces at the 1650 Battle of Dunbar and transported aboard the Unity to North America. They were sold as indentured servants whose labor would earn them freedom. The community was dubbed the Parish of Unity after the ship.

The village was attacked in 1675 during King Philip's War, then raided again in 1690–1691 during King William's War by Indians under the command of officers from New France, who burned the Parish of Unity to the ground. It was abandoned, but resettled in 1703 under its Abenaki name, Newichawannock. The Massachusetts General Court incorporated it in 1713 as Berwick, the 9th oldest town in Maine. It was named after Berwick-upon-Tweed, a town of mixed allegiances on the Anglo-Scottish border. What evolved into today's Berwick Academy opened in 1791. On February 12, 1814, South Berwick was set off and incorporated.

During the 19th century, various mills were erected at the rivers to use their water power. At the head of navigation, Quampheagan Falls on the Salmon Falls River became the site of the Portsmouth Manufacturing Company. Established in 1831, the cotton textile mill had 7000 spindles and 216 looms, which by 1868 produced 2 million yards of sheeting per year. The mill closed in 1893, and most of its brick buildings were razed about 1917, but the Greek Revival counting house is now the Old Berwick Historical Society Museum. South Berwick also made woolens, shoes, plows, and cultivators, as well as sawn and planed lumber. The town was noted for its apple orchards. Some inhabitants worked across the bridge in Rollinsford, New Hampshire at the Salmon Falls Manufacturing Company, which closed in 1927. The village center was listed on the National Register of Historic Places in 2010.

In 1901, local author Sarah Orne Jewett set her historical romance The Tory Lover at the Hamilton House in South Berwick. Built about 1785, the Federal style mansion is now a museum operated by Historic New England, which also owns the Sarah Orne Jewett House, built in 1774 overlooking Central Square.

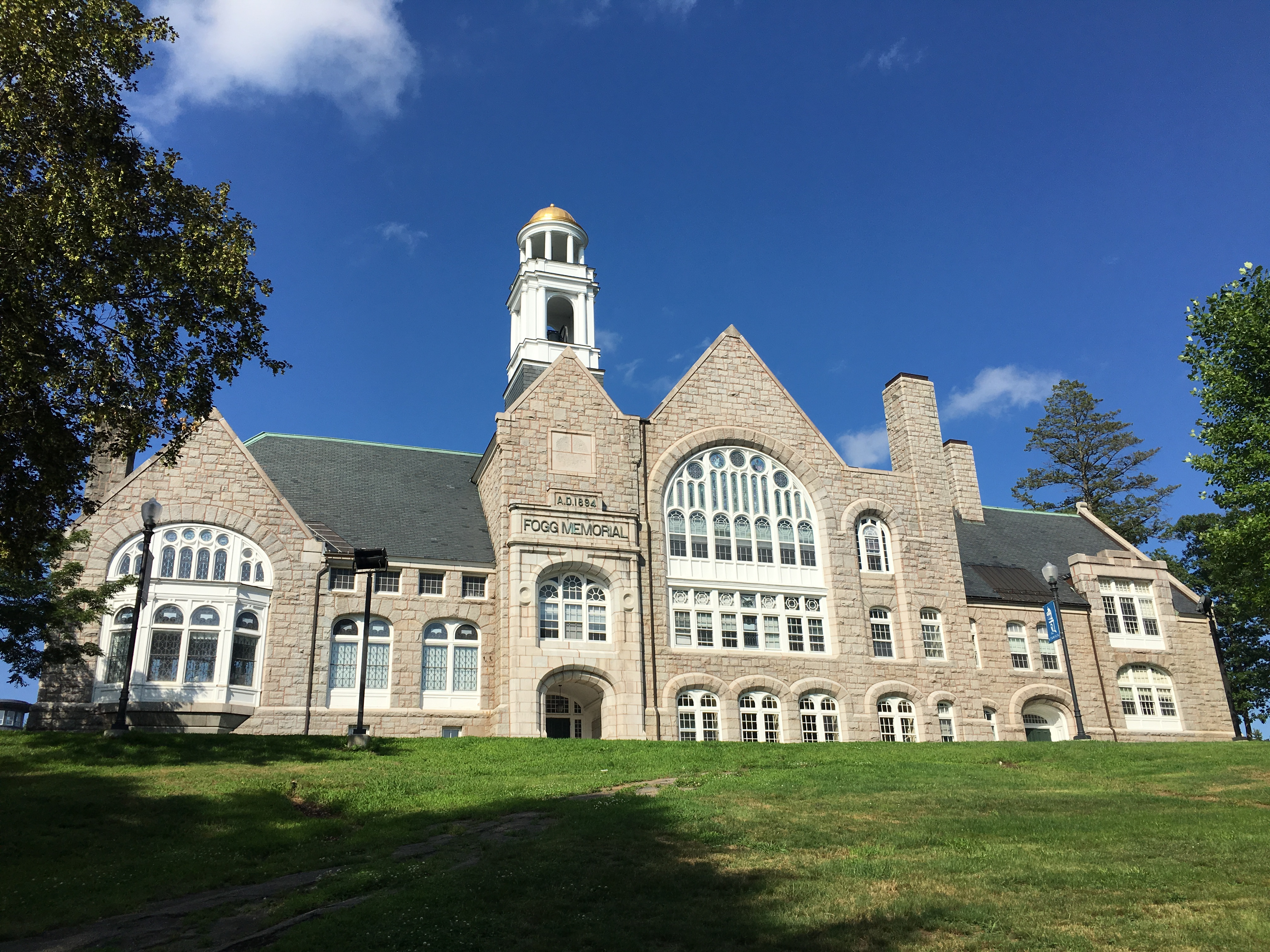
Fogg Memorial at the Berwick Academy

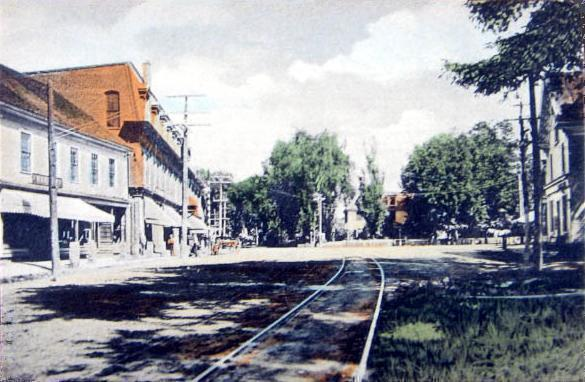
Central Square c. 1910

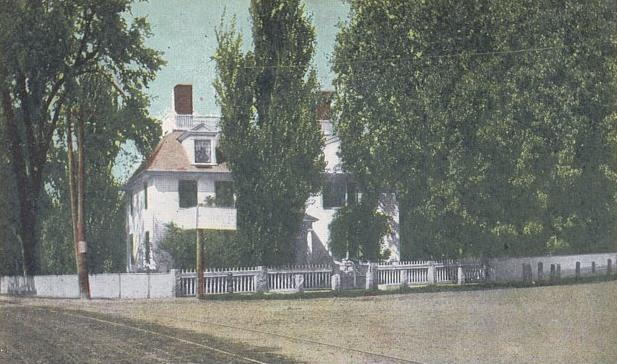
Sarah Orne Jewett House c. 1910

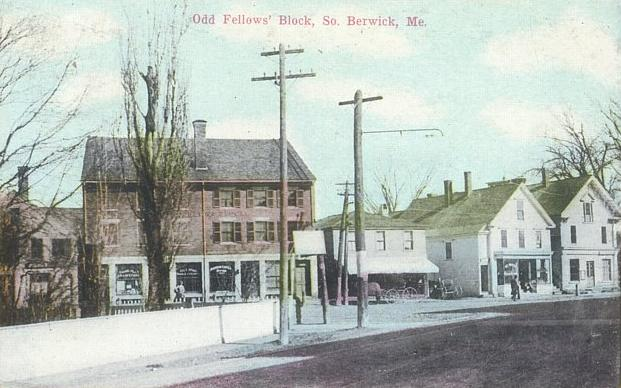
Odd Fellows' Block c. 1910

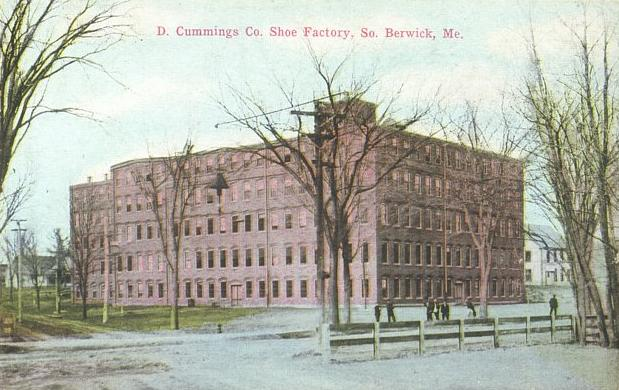
David Cummings & Co. Shoe Factory c. 1910

== Geography ==
According to the United States Census Bureau, the town has a total area of 32.64 square miles (84.54 km^{2}), of which 32.13 square miles (83.22 km^{2}) is land and 0.51 square miles (1.32 km^{2}) water. Located beside the New Hampshire border, South Berwick is drained by the Great Works River and Salmon Falls River. Welch Hill, elevation 370 feet (112.8 m) above sea level, is the town's highest point. The lowest elevation, which is sea level, is located along the Salmon Falls River, from the small hydroelectric dam next to the New Hampshire Route 4 bridge, south to the town's border with Eliot.

== Demographics ==
Historical population
Census	Pop.	Note	%±
1820	1,475		—
1830	1,577		6.9%
1840	2,314		46.7%
1850	2,592		12.0%
1860	2,624		1.2%
1870	2,510		−4.3%
1880	2,677		6.7%
1890	3,434		28.3%
1900	3,188		−7.2%
1910	2,935		−7.9%
1920	2,955		0.7%
1930	2,650		−10.3%
1940	2,546		−3.9%
1950	2,646		3.9%
1960	3,112		17.6%
1970	3,488		12.1%
1980	4,046		16.0%
1990	5,877		45.3%
2000	6,671		13.5%
2010	7,220		8.2%
2020	7,467		3.4%
U.S. Decennial Census

=== 2010 census ===
As of the census of 2010, there were 7,220 people, 2,729 households, and 1,979 families residing in the town. The population density was 224.7 inhabitants per square mile (86.8/km^{2}). There were 2,911 housing units at an average density of 90.6 per square mile (35.0/km^{2}). The racial makeup of the town was 97.5% White, 0.2% African American, 0.2% Native American, 0.8% Asian, 0.2% from other races, and 1.1% from two or more races. Hispanic or Latino of any race were 0.8% of the population.

There were 2,729 households, of which 38.3% had children under the age of 18 living with them, 59.1% were married couples living together, 9.4% had a female householder with no husband present, 4.0% had a male householder with no wife present, and 27.5% were non-families. 21.3% of all households were made up of individuals, and 7.9% had someone living alone who was 65 years of age or older. The average household size was 2.64 and the average family size was 3.09.

The median age in the town was 40.5 years. 26.6% of residents were under the age of 18; 7.3% were between the ages of 18 and 24; 23.5% were from 25 to 44; 32.4% were from 45 to 64; and 10.1% were 65 years of age or older. The gender makeup of the town was 49.4% male and 50.6% female.

=== 2000 census ===
As of the census of 2000, there were 6,671 people, 2,403 households, and 1,847 families residing in the town. The population density was 207.5 inhabitants per square mile (80.1/km^{2}). There were 2,488 housing units at an average density of 77.4 per square mile (29.9/km^{2}). The racial makeup of the town was 97.63% White, 0.30% African American, 0.30% Native American, 0.66% Asian, 0.27% from other races, and 0.84% from two or more races. Hispanic or Latino of any race were 0.67% of the population.

There were 2,403 households, out of which 44.0% had children under the age of 18 living with them, 64.3% were married couples living together, 8.7% had a female householder with no husband present, and 23.1% were non-families. 18.4% of all households were made up of individuals, and 6.7% had someone living alone who was 65 years of age or older. The average household size was 2.76 and the average family size was 3.17.

In the town, the population was spread out, with 30.4% under the age of 18, 5.4% from 18 to 24, 32.8% from 25 to 44, 23.0% from 45 to 64, and 8.4% who were 65 years of age or older. The median age was 36 years. For every 100 females, there were 97.4 males. For every 100 females age 18 and over, there were 93.0 males.

The median income for a household in the town was $53,201, and the median income for a family was $59,330. Males had a median income of $40,107 versus $25,729 for females. The per capita income for the town was $21,118. About 2.8% of families and 2.9% of the population were below the poverty line, including 1.3% of those under age 18 and 7.1% of those age 65 or over.

== Strawberry Festival ==
Since 1976, South Berwick has hosted a Strawberry Festival on the last Saturday in June. Originally organized to celebrate the United States Bicentennial, its popularity has convinced the festival's organizers to hold it each year since. It includes shops, food, games and rides for children and trolley rides. The festival is held on the grounds of Central School, the primary elementary school for the town of South Berwick.

== Sites of interest ==
- Counting House Museum, c. 1832 or 1850 – Old Berwick Historical Society
- Hamilton House – Historic New England
- Jewett-Eastman House – Historic New England
- Punkintown
- Sarah Orne Jewett House – Historic New England
- Vaughan Woods State Park

== Notable people ==
- Nicholson Baker (born 1957), novelist and non-fiction writer
- John H. Burleigh (1822–1877), U.S. congressman
- William Burleigh (1785–1827), U.S. congressman
- Slaid Cleaves (born 1964), singer-songwriter
- John Noble Goodwin (1824–1887), attorney, politician, and U.S. congressman
- John Hubbard (1849–1932), United States Navy rear admiral
- Sarah Orne Jewett (1849–1909), novelist
- J. Harold Murray(1891–1940), singer and film actor
- Rod Picott (born 1964), singer-songwriter
- Robert M. Pirsig (1928–2017), writer, philosopher
- Deanna Rix (born 1987), wrestler
- Charles Sleeper (1856–1924), physician, state legislator, and Collector of the Port of Portland, Maine
- Luther C. Tibbets (1820–1902), founded California citrus industry with wife Eliza Tibbets

== Sister cities ==
- Tuskegee, AL, USA
